= Meanings of minor-planet names: 8001–9000 =

As minor planet discoveries are confirmed, they are given a permanent number by the IAU's Minor Planet Center (MPC), and the discoverers can then submit names for them, following the IAU's naming conventions. The list below concerns those minor planets in the specified number-range that have received names, and explains the meanings of those names.

Official naming citations of newly named small Solar System bodies are approved and published in a bulletin by IAU's Working Group for Small Bodies Nomenclature (WGSBN). Before May 2021, citations were published in MPC's Minor Planet Circulars for many decades. Recent citations can also be found on the JPL Small-Body Database (SBDB). Until his death in 2016, German astronomer Lutz D. Schmadel compiled these citations into the Dictionary of Minor Planet Names (DMP) and regularly updated the collection.

Based on Paul Herget's The Names of the Minor Planets, Schmadel also researched the unclear origin of numerous asteroids, most of which had been named prior to World War II. This article incorporates text from this source, which is in the public domain: SBDB New namings may only be added to this list below after official publication as the preannouncement of names is condemned. The WGSBN publishes a comprehensive guideline for the naming rules of non-cometary small Solar System bodies.

== 8001–8100 ==
Named minor planet	Provisional	This minor planet was named for...	Ref · Catalog
8001 Ramsden	1986 TR_{3}	Jesse Ramsden (1735–1800) was the British designer and producer of highly accurate sextants, theodolites and other instruments. Piazzi discovered Ceres using the Ramsden vertical circle of the Palermo Observatory. The name was suggested by J. Ticha on seeing this instrument during the Asteroids 2001 conference.	JPL · 8001
8002 Tonyevans	1986 XF_{5}	Anthony Evans (born 1944) is an English amateur astronomer involved in tracking Near-Earth Asteroids. He established the "A-Team" of asteroid- and comet-tracking enthusiasts, using robotic telescopes, providing tutorials and assistance to those interested in submitting observations to the MPC.	IAU · 8002
8003 Kelvin	1987 RJ	William Thomson, 1st Baron Kelvin (Lord Kelin; 1824–1907), Scots-Irish physicist	JPL · 8003
8005 Albinadubois	1988 MJ	Albina du Boisrouvray (born 1941), French philanthropist	JPL · 8005
8006 Tacchini	1988 QU	Pietro Tacchini (1838–1905), Italian astronomer, founder of the Italian Society of Spectroscopists, the forerunner of the Societá Astronomica Italiana (Italian Astronomical Society)	JPL · 8006
8009 Béguin	1989 BA_{1}	The word Béguin, or "flirtation" in English, gives rise to the vigorous dance of the French West Indies, the beguine.	JPL · 8009
8010 Böhnhardt	1989 GB_{1}	Hermann Böhnhardt (born 1955), German astronomer at ESO	MPC · 8010
8011 Saijokeiichi	1989 WG_{7}	Keiichi Saijo (born 1949), curator of the astronomy section of National Science Museum, Tokyo.	JPL · 8011
8013 Gordonmoore	1990 KA	Gordon Moore (born 1929), American physicist, businessman and co-founder of Intel	JPL · 8013
8015 Marksimons	1990 QT_{2}	Mark Simons, an American geophysicist.	IAU · 8015
8019 Karachkina	1990 TH_{12}	Lyudmila Karachkina (born 1948), Ukrainian astronomer, wife of Yurii Vasilievich Karachkin, physics teacher, after whom 8089 Yukar was named.	JPL · 8019
8020 Erzgebirge	1990 TV_{13}	The Ore Mountains, a mountain range in Germany and the Czech Republic †	MPC · 8020
8021 Walter	1990 UO_{2}	Walter Anderson (born 1944) is a long-time editor of Parade, a magazine that reaches more than 80 million readers weekly.	JPL · 8021
8022 Scottcrossfield	1990 VD_{7}	Albert Scott Crossfield (1921–2006), a test pilot who was the first X-15 pilot and made a total of 14 flights. In 1953 Crossfield was the first pilot to exceed Mach 2 in the D-558-II Skyrocket. While an NACA research pilot, he made a total of 87 flights in the rocket-powered X-1 and D-558-II research aircraft	JPL · 8022
8023 Josephwalker	1991 DD	Joseph A. Walker (1921–1966), a NASA research pilot who was the second pilot to fly the X-15 and made a total of 25 flights. Three of these flights entered space and he received NASA astronaut wings posthumously in 2005.	JPL · 8023
8024 Robertwhite	1991 FN	Robert Michael White (1924–2010), an Air Force test pilot who was the third pilot to fly the X-15 and made a total of 16 flights. He was the first pilot to fly Mach 4, Mach 5 and Mach 6, and the first to fly a winged vehicle into space. White received Air Force astronaut wings for the flight.	JPL · 8024
8025 Forrestpeterson	1991 FB_{4}	Forrest S. Petersen (1922–1990), a Navy test pilot who was the 4th pilot, and the only Navy pilot, to fly the X-15 and made a total of five flights.	JPL · 8025
8026 Johnmckay	1991 JA_{1}	John B. McKay (1922–1975), a NASA research pilot who was the 5th pilot to fly the X-15 and made a total of 29 flights. Before joining the X-15 program, he made 46 flights in the X-1 and D-558-II Skyrocket. In 2005 McKay received posthumous NASA astronaut wings for a flight that reached an altitude of 89900 metres.	JPL · 8026
8027 Robertrushworth	1991 PB_{12}	Robert A. Rushworth (1924–1993), an Air Force test pilot who was the 6th pilot to fly the X-15 and made a total of 34 flights. One of these flights reached 86800 meters, for which Rushworth received Air Force astronaut wings.	JPL · 8027
8028 Joeengle	1991 QE	Joe Engle (born 1932), an Air Force test pilot who was the 8th pilot to fly the X-15 and made a total of 16 flights. He received Air Force astronaut wings for a flight that took him to 85500 meters. Engle also flew the Space Shuttle, becoming the only person who reached space before being selected as an astronaut.	JPL · 8028
8029 Miltthompson	1991 RR_{30}	Milton Orville Thompson (1926–1993), a NASA research pilot who was the 9th pilot to fly the X-15 and made a total of 14 flights. He subsequently made the first flights of the M2-F1 and M2-F2 lifting bodies, which were the forerunners of the Space Shuttle.	JPL · 8029
8030 Williamknight	1991 SK	William J. Knight (1929–2004), an Air Force test pilot who was the 10th pilot to fly the X-15 and made a total of 16 flights. These included the fastest X-15 flight, which reached Mach 6.7, and another flight to 69600 meters for which he received astronaut wings.	JPL · 8030
8031 Williamdana	1992 ER	William H. Dana (1930–2014), a NASA research pilot who was the 11th pilot to fly the X-15 and made a total of 16 flights. These included a 1967 flight to 93500 meters and he received NASA astronaut wings in 2005. Dana made the 199th and final X-15 flight in 1968 and subsequently flew the M2-F3 and HL-10 lifting bodies.	JPL · 8031
8032 Michaeladams	1992 ES_{1}	Michael J. Adams (1930–1967), an Air Force test pilot who was the 12th pilot to fly the X-15 and made seven flights. On 1967 Nov. 15, he was killed when his X-15 broke up during reentry. The first American to die in the course of a spaceflight, Adams was awarded posthumous Air Force astronaut wings.	JPL · 8032
8034 Akka	1992 LR	Akka, the Finnish earth mother and goddess of the harvest and female sexuality.	JPL · 8034
8036 Maehara	1992 UG_{4}	Hideo Maehara (born 1940), professor of the National Astronomical Observatory of Japan and director of the Okayama Astrophysical Observatory	JPL · 8036
8039 Grandprism	1993 RB_{16}	The Grand Prism Objectiv-40 cm astrograph (GPO), used without prism, has served for many years for searching for minor planets at La Silla. JPL	MPC · 8039
8040 Utsumikazuhiko	1993 SY_{3}	Kazuhiko Utsumi (born 1937), made the first identification of many of the spectral lines and determined element abundances for carbon stars. At Hiroshima University he has taught astronomy and astrophysics to more than 30~000 students.	JPL · 8040
8041 Masumoto	1993 VR_{2}	Takeji Masumoto, builder of the discoverer's observatory.	JPL · 8041
8043 Fukuhara	1994 XE_{1}	Naohito Fukuhara (born 1965), a computer engineer and amateur astronomer.	JPL · 8043
8044 Tsuchiyama	1994 YT	Yukiko Tsuchiyama (born 1963), a Japanese amateur variable star observer who studies star names as a hobby.	JPL · 8044
8045 Kamiyama	1995 AW	Haruki Kamiyama (born 1960), an amateur astronomer and computer programmer.	JPL · 8045
8046 Ajiki	1995 BU	Osamu Ajiki (born 1965), an amateur astronomer and computer programmer, contributed to the popularization of astronomy by developing a wide variety of astronomical software that is regularly used by astronomers around the world.	JPL · 8046
8047 Akikinoshita	1995 BT_{3}	Akihiko Kinoshita (born 1963), an amateur astronomer and editor.	JPL · 8047
8048 Andrle	1995 DB_{1}	Pavel Andrle (1936–1991), Czech astronomer.	MPC · 8049
8049 Janvier	1996 FL_{2}	Miho Janvier, French solar and space physicist at the European Space Agency.	IAU · 8048
8050 Beishida	1996 ST	Beishida, the Beijing Normal University, is one of the earliest well-known Chinese universities. Founded in 1902, it is an important center for scientific research and the training of excellent teachers and other professionals.	MPC · 8050
8051 Pistoria	1997 PP_{4}	Pistoia, Italy	JPL · 8051
8052 Novalis	2093 P-L	Novalis (1772–1801), poet and philosopher of Early German Romanticism	JPL · 8052
8053 Kleist	4082 P-L	Heinrich von Kleist (1777–1811), a German poet and dramatist	JPL · 8053
8054 Brentano	4581 P-L	Clemens Brentano (1778–1842), a German novelist and poet of German Romanticism	JPL · 8054
8055 Arnim	5004 P-L	Ludwig Achim von Arnim (1781–1831), a German novelist and poet of German Romanticism	JPL · 8055
8056 Tieck	6038 P-L	Ludwig Tieck (1773–1853), a German novelist, translator and poet of German Romanticism	JPL · 8056
8057 Hofmannsthal	4034 T-1	Hugo von Hofmannsthal (1874–1929) began writing poems at the age of 16. His lyrical and dramatic work reflects Austrian impressionism and symbolism. Together with Richard Strauss and Max Reinhardt, he founded the Salzburger Festspiele. His best-known play is Jedermann.	JPL · 8057
8058 Zuckmayer	3241 T-3	Carl Zuckmayer (1896–1977), a German writer and playwright	MPC · 8058
8059 Deliyannis	1957 JP	Constantine Deliyannis (born 1959), on the faculty of Indiana University, has studied the evolution of solar-type stars through his investigations of the abundance of lithium and beryllium in star clusters. He has also made an observational verification of the roles of mixing and diffusion in the evolution of stars.	JPL · 8059
8060 Anius	1973 SD_{1}	Anius, son and priest to Apollo on the isle of Delos.	JPL · 8060
8061 Gaudium	1975 UF	Latin for joy, pleasure and delight, Gaudium is designed to compensate the gloom of (5708) Melancholia.	JPL · 8061
8062 Okhotsymskij	1977 EZ	Dmitrij Evgenievich Okhotsymskij (born 1921), a specialist in theoretical and applied mechanics.	JPL · 8062
8063 Cristinathomas	1977 XP_{2}	Cristina A. Thomas (born 1982), a postdoctoral research scientist at Northern Arizona University.	JPL · 8063
8064 Lisitsa	1978 RR	Physicist Mikhail Pavlovich Lisitsa (born 1921) is a professor at Kiev University.	JPL · 8064
8065 Nakhodkin	1979 FD_{3}	Nikolaj Grigorievich Nakhodkin (born 1925), a faculty head at Kiev University.	JPL · 8065
8066 Poldimeri	1980 PB_{2}	Leopold Bausbek (born 1938) and Meri Bausbek (born 1945), astronomy enthusiasts and friends of Danish discoverer Richard Martin West	JPL · 8066
8067 Helfenstein	1980 RU	Paul Helfenstein (born 1954), American astronomer of Cornell University	MPC · 8067
8068 Vishnureddy	1981 EQ_{28}	Vishnu Vardhan Reddy (born 1978), a research professor at the University of North Dakota and a visiting scientist at the Max Planck Institute for Solar System Research	JPL · 8068
8069 Benweiss	1981 EF_{30}	Benjamin P. Weiss (born 1973), a professor of planetary Science at MIT.	JPL · 8069
8070 DeMeo	1981 EM_{30}	Francesca DeMeo (born 1984), a postdoctoral researcher at MIT who completed her 2010 Ph.D. thesis at the Paris Observatory. An expert in spectral studies of small bodies, she extended to near-infrared wavelengths a taxonomic classification system for minor planets, known as the Bus–DeMeo taxonomy.	JPL · 8070
8071 Simonelli	1981 GO	Damon Paul Simonelli (born 1959), American astronomer and planetary scientist at Cornell University	MPC · 8071
8072 Yojikondo	1981 GO_{1}	Yoji Kondo (born 1933), Japanese-born U.S. astrophysicist.	JPL · 8072
8073 Johnharmon	1982 BS	John K. Harmon (born 1948), scientist at Arecibo Observatory	JPL · 8073
8074 Slade	1984 WC_{2}	Martin A. Slade (born 1942), scientist at the Jet Propulsion Laboratory	JPL · 8074
8075 Roero	1985 PE	Roero, the region in Piemont, Italy	JPL · 8075
8076 Foscarini	1985 RV_{4}	Paolo Antonio Foscarini (1565–1616), an Italian Carmelite father, philosopher and scientist.	JPL · 8076
8077 Hoyle	1986 AW_{2}	Fred Hoyle (1915–2001) English astronomer, known for the theory of stellar nucleosynthesis and his rejection of the "Big Bang". He served as president of the Royal Astronomical Society from 1971 to 1973.	JPL · 8077
8078 Carolejordan	1986 RS_{2}	Carole Jordan, professor of physics at Somerville College, Oxford University.	JPL · 8078
8079 Bernardlovell	1986 XF_{1}	Sir Bernard Lovell (born 1913) founded Jodrell Bank Observatory, which boasts the world's first large steerable radio telescope. Lovell served as president of the Royal Astronomical Society from 1969 to 1971.	JPL · 8079
8080 Intel	1987 WU_{2}	The Intel 8080 microprocessor is the ancestor of a series of microprocessor chips going from the 8086, 8088, 80286, 80386, 80486 to today's processors. Fundamental to the "PC revolution", the 8080 did much to advance astronomy at amateur and professional observatories worldwide.	JPL · 8080
8081 Leopardi	1988 DD	Giacomo Leopardi (1798–1837), Italian poet and prose writer	JPL · 8081
8082 Haynes	1988 NR	Norman R. Haynes (born 1936) spent a 41-year career in the leadership of planetary exploration. He worked at the Jet Propulsion Laboratory and served as Voyager Project Manager, Systems Division Manager, Director for Telecommunications and Mission Operations and Director for Mars Exploration.	JPL · 8082
8083 Mayeda	1988 VB	Shizuo (Haruhisa) Mayeda (1914–1952), Japanese amateur astronomer	JPL · 8083
8084 Dallas	1989 CL_{1}	Dallas, a major city in the U.S. state of Texas	JPL · 8084
8086 Peterthomas	1989 RB_{6}	Peter Chew Thomas (born 1946), American astronomer †	MPC · 8086
8087 Kazutaka	1989 WA_{2}	Kazutaka Kato (born 1949), director of the Hiroshima City Planetarium.	JPL · 8087
8088 Australia	1990 SL_{27}	Australia, the continent in the Southern Hemisphere	JPL · 8088
8089 Yukar	1990 TW_{7}	Yurii Vasil'evich Karachkin (born 1940), physics teacher at the school attached to the Crimean Astrophysical Observatory. Yurii is the husband of astronomer Lyudmila Georgievna Karachkina, after whom 8019 Karachkina is named	MPC · 8089
8096 Émilezola	1993 OW_{3}	Émile Zola (1840–1902), French writer	MPC · 8096
8097 Yamanishi	1993 RE	Masahiro Yamanishi (born 1960), senior researcher at Saji Observatory	JPL · 8097
8098 Miyamotoatsushi	1993 SH_{2}	Atsushi Miyamoto (born 1961), senior researcher at Saji Observatory and a board member of the Tottori Society of Astronomy.	JPL · 8098
8099 Okudoiyoshimi	1993 TE	Yoshimi Okudoi (born 1992) is a member of the Matsue Astronomy Club. She is an architect and has written a paper "Observation Room Features and Problems of Public Observatories in Japan".	IAU · 8099
8100 Nobeyama	1993 XF	Nobeyama, a village in central Japan	JPL · 8100

== 8101–8200 ==
back to top

Named minor planet	Provisional	This minor planet was named for...	Ref · Catalog
8101 Yasue	1993 XK_{1}	Kunio Yasue (born 1951), director of the Science Laboratory at Okayama Seishin University, has studied mathematical physics and quantum field theory. One of his major contributions to astronomy is his work on spontaneous symmetry breaking at an early stage of the universe's evolution	JPL · 8101
8102 Yoshikazu	1994 AQ_{2}	Yoshikazu Kato (born 1962) is a Japanese amateur astronomer. He edits an e-mail newsletter on astronomy that is sent every week to over 4500 readers, helping to make popularize astronomical knowledge	JPL · 8102
8103 Fermi	1994 BE	Enrico Fermi (1901–1954), Italian physicist and 1938 Nobel Prize laureate	MPC · 8103
8104 Kumamori	1994 BW_{4}	Teruaki Kumamori (born 1949), planetarium educator of Sakai City Culture Center, Osaka, is an expert in telescope making and has made Wright-Väisälä, Dall-Kirkham, Schiefspiegler and other optics in addition to mechanical parts for them. He also takes high-resolution digital movies of the planets	JPL · 8104
8106 Carpino	1994 YB	Mario Carpino (born 1957), an Italian astronomer at the Brera Astronomical Observatory in Milan. From his initial studies of satellite geodesy, he acquired a taste for extreme accuracy in orbit determination, applying these skills to the study of the dynamics of solar-system bodies in projects such as LONGSTOP and SPACEGUARD. When the Spaceguard Foundation was established in Rome in 1996 he became its secretary (Src).	MPC · 8106
8108 Wieland	1995 BC_{16}	Christoph Martin Wieland (1733–1813), German poet of the Rococo period and German Enlightenment	MPC · 8108
8109 Danielwilliam	1995 DU_{1}	Daniel William Hergenrother (born 2010), a son of the discoverer.	JPL · 8109
8110 Heath	1995 DE_{2}	Alan W. Heath (born 1931) is a British planetary observer. He was director of the British Astronomical Association's Saturn section during 1964–1970 and 1976–1994. He has also served the BAA as assistant director of the Jupiter section and secretary of the Lunar section. He was awarded the BAA's Goodacre Medal in 1986	JPL · 8110
8111 Hoepli	1995 GE	Ulrico Hoepli (1847–1935), Italian publisher, who donated a planetarium to the city of Milan Src	MPC · 8111
8112 Cesi	1995 JJ	Federico Cesi (1585–1630), a scientist and humanist of the Italian Renaissance who founded the Accademia dei Lincei	MPC · 8112
8113 Matsue	1996 HD_{1}	Matsue, a city located in the ancient Izumo district in western Japan. A beautiful city rich in culture, history and archaeological remains, Matsue has been designated as an International Cultural Center	JPL · 8113
8114 Lafcadio	1996 HZ_{1}	Lafcadio Hearn (1850–1904), Irish-Greek writer who worked as a newspaper reporter in the United States for 20 years before moving to Japan in 1890, changing his name to Yakumo Koizumi and becoming a naturalized Japanese citizen.	MPC · 8114
8115 Sakabe	1996 HB_{2}	Sanjiro Sakabe (1923–2001), an amateur astronomer who studied under the late Issei Yamamoto. Sakabe is the founder of the Dynic Astronomical Observatory, which contributes to the spread of astronomy in the surrounding area	JPL · 8115
8116 Jeanperrin	1996 HA_{15}	Jean Baptiste Perrin (1870–1942), French physicist who studied the Brownian motion of minute particles suspended in liquids	MPC · 8116
8117 Yuanlongping	1996 SD_{1}	Yuan Longping (1929–2021), member of the Chinese Academy of Engineering, head of the National Hybrid Rice Engineering and Technical Research Center of China. As the founder of the Chinese hybrid rice research effort, he contributes greatly to great production in China and worldwide. He has won many international prizes and is honored as the "Father of Hybrid Rice" by foreign colleagues	JPL · 8117
8120 Kobe	1997 VT	Kobe the primary port on the Seto Inland Sea since the eighth century and one of Japan's most cosmopolitan cities, where the discoverer lived for five years during his student days. Kobe has made a remarkable recovery from the Great Hanshin earthquake in 1995. Name proposed by the discoverer and citation proposed by I. Hasegawa	JPL · 8120
8121 Altdorfer	2572 P-L	Albrecht Altdorfer (c. 1480–1538), German painter of the Renaissance	MPC · 8121
8122 Holbein	4038 P-L	Hans Holbein the Elder (c. 1465–1524) and Hans Holbein the Younger (c. 1497–1543), German painters	MPC · 8122
8123 Canaletto	3138 T-1	Canaletto (1697–1768), Venetian artist	MPC · 8123
8124 Guardi	4370 T-1	Francesco Guardi (1712–1793), Italian painter of the Rococo period	MPC · 8124
8125 Tyndareus	5493 T-2	Tyndareus, king of Sparta from Greek mythology	MPC · 8125
8126 Chanwainam	1966 BL	Chan Wainam (born 1919), Chinese educator and charity worker	JPL · 8126
8127 Beuf	1967 HA	Francisco Beuf (1834–1889), a French astronomer, who participated in the organization of the Argentinian Navy School and the La Plata Observatory, of which he was the first director	JPL · 8127
8128 Nicomachus	1967 JP	Nicomachus (c. 60 – c. 120 AD), Greek mathematician	MPC · 8128
8129 Michaelbusch	1975 SK_{1}	Michael W. Busch (born 1987), a Jansky Fellow at the Department of Earth and Space Sciences of the University of California, Los Angeles.	JPL · 8129
8130 Seeberg	1976 DJ_{1}	Gotha Observatory (Seeberg Observatory), situated upon a well-marked hill close to the town of Gotha. In the time of the duke Ernst II von Sachsen-Gotha-Altenburg (1745–1804) and the astronomer F. X. von Zach, it was an important center for astronomy. The first meeting of European astronomers took place at the Seeberg Observatory in August 1798. This naming honors the 200th anniversary of that conference, as well as the 1998 International Spring Meeting of the Astronomische Gesellschaft in Gotha, held on the occasion of this anniversary. Name endorsed by P. Brosche	JPL · 8130
8131 Scanlon	1976 SC	Leo J. Scanlon (1903–1999) amateur astronomer, co-founder of the Amateur Astronomers Association of Pittsburgh, or AAAP. Member of the Academy of Science and Art of Pittsburgh.	MPC · 8131
8132 Vitginzburg	1976 YA_{6}	Vitaly Ginzburg (1916–2009), Russian physicist and Nobelist	JPL · 8132
8133 Takanochoei	1977 DX_{3}	Takano Choei (1804–1850) was born in Mizusawa, Iwate prefecture. He was a physician and scholar of Dutch studies (Western learning) in the late Edo period	JPL · 8133
8134 Minin	1978 SQ_{7}	Kuz'ma Minich Zakhar'ev Sukhorukij (Kuz'ma Minin, died 1616) was one of the organizers of the second people's volunteer corps in Nizhnij Novgorod during 1611–1612. He displayed great action and personal bravery in the battle with Polish troops near Moscow and is a favorite national hero in Russia	JPL · 8134
8135 Davidmitchell	1978 VP_{10}	David Francis Mitchell (born 1962) is the "Acting Director of Planetary Science Projects" and "Director of Flight Projects" (FPD) for NASA's Lucy mission. He has also been selected as the "Director of Engineering and Technology" at Goddard Space Flight Center (GSFC) in 2021.	IAU · 8135
8136 Landis	1979 MH_{2}	Rob R. Landis (born 1963) is a NEO Program Officer at NASA Headquarters. Rob's lifelong passion for astronomy has taken him from working part-time while in college at Abrams Planetarium, through a widely varied career on NASA missions, including HST, Cassini, Mars Exploration Rovers and the ISS	JPL · 8136
8137 Kvíz	1979 SJ	Zdeněk Kvíz (1932–1993), Czech astronomer	MPC · 8137
8138 Craigbowers	1980 FF_{12}	Craig Bowers (born 1958) was a meridian-telescope observer for the Perth 75 catalogue, and also monitored variable stars. He was heavily involved in the continuous Lowell/Perth telescope CCD observations of 1P/Halley, including the discovery of the jets of CN gas leading to the defining of the rotation period of the nucleus. His PhD thesis detailed the scientific history of Perth Observatory from 1960 to 1993.	IAU · 8138
8139 Paulabell	1980 UM_{1}	Paul A. Abell (born 1965), lead scientist for small bodies in the Astromaterials Research and Exploration Science Directorate at the NASA Johnson Space Center.	JPL · 8139
8140 Hardersen	1981 EO_{15}	Paul S. Hardersen (born 1965), a professor and observatory director in the Department of Space Studies at the University of North Dakota.	JPL · 8140
8141 Nikolaev	1982 SO_{4}	Nikolaev is a city and large industrial and cultural center in southern Ukraine. The Nikolaev Astronomical Observatory was established there in 1821	JPL · 8141
8142 Zolotov	1982 UR_{6}	Andrej Andreevich Zolotov (born 1937), Russian screenwriter and art and music critic. He is the author of more than 30 documentary films about Russian musicians, composers and conductors. Name suggested by G. Sviridov and supported by the discoverer	JPL · 8142
8143 Nezval	1982 VN	Vítězslav Nezval (1900–1958), a Czech poet, founder of the Poetism movement and later founder of the surrealist group of Czechoslovakia	JPL · 8143
8144 Hiragagennai	1982 VY_{2}	Hiraga Gennai (1728–1779) was born in Takamatsu, Kagawa prefecture. He was a scientist, pharmacologist and playwright in the middle Edo period	JPL · 8144
8145 Valujki	1983 RY_{4}	The small Russian town of Valujki, founded in 1593 as a southern fortress of the Moscow State, is the center of the Valujki district of the Belgorod region. Located at a picturesque place near the confluence of the Valuj and Oskol rivers, it is a town of railwaymen and of workers in the food industry	JPL · 8145
8146 Jimbell	1983 WG	James Francis Bell III (born 1965), American astronomer and planetary scientist at Cornell University	MPC · 8146
8147 Colemanhawkins	1984 SU_{3}	Coleman Hawkins (1904–1969), American jazz tenor saxophonist	MPC · 8147
8148 Golding	1985 CR_{2}	Margarette Oliver Golding (1881–1939) founded the Inner Wheel movement in 1924, one of the largest women's voluntary service organizations in the world.	JPL · 8148
8149 Ruff	1985 JN_{1}	Jan Ruff (born 1949) is the very capable, warm-spirited and enthusiastic chief of the Office of Public Affairs for Goddard Space Center, NASA. Steve Ruff (born 1949) is an imaginative, creative and knowledgeable middle-school teacher with a wonderful dry sense of humor	JPL · 8149
8150 Kaluga	1985 QL_{4}	Kaluga, a town in the Russian Federation and the focus of the Kalugian region, is a prominent industrial and cultural center. Founded in 1371, the town is much recorded in the history of Russia. The Tsiolkovsky Museum of Cosmonautics and one of the oldest theaters in Russia are located there	JPL · 8150
8151 Andranada	1986 PK_{6}	Andrej Vladimirovich Shakhov (born 1954) works in the faculty of diseases of the ear, nose and throat at the Nizhnij Novgorod State Medical Academy. His wife, Natalia Mikhailovna Shakhova (born 1957) works in the faculty of midwifery and gynecology	JPL · 8151
8152 Martinlee	1986 VY	Martin Lee (born 1964) is a researcher based at the University of Glasgow. He is an expert on thermal and aqueous alteration of minerals in martian and chondritic meteorites and the effects of shock metamorphism on meteorite parent bodies.	JPL · 8152
8153 Gattacceca	1986 WO_{1}	Jérôme Gattacceca (born 1973) is a research scientist based in CEREGE à Aix-en-Provence, France. Jérôme is an expert on the magnetic signatures of meteorites and Moon rocks. He leads meteorite recovery missions to the Atacama desert in Chile, and is the head of the Meteoritical Society nomenclature committee.	JPL · 8153
8154 Stahl	1988 CQ_{7}	Georg Ernst Stahl (16601734), German physician and chemist who developed the phlogiston theory of combustion, which dominated chemical thought for almost a century. Contrary to the view of his friend Friedrich Hoffmann at the University of Halle, who considered living organisms as machines to be explained by the laws of mechanics, Stahl insisted that neither mechanical nor chemical laws alone were sufficient to account for the phenomenon of life. Most likely influenced by his pietism, he insisted that life required a force for which he reserved the Latin word anima, which in turn gave rise to the theory of animism (vitalism)	JPL · 8154
8155 Battaglini	1988 QA	Giuseppe Battaglini (1826–1894), Italian mathematician	MPC · 8155
8156 Tsukada	1988 TR	Shinsuke Tsukada (born 1954), director of the Yonago City Planetarium, Tottori Prefecture, and an executive member of the San-in Society of Astronomy, the Tottori Society of Astronomy. Provider of varied and informative planetarium programs for the general public on an ongoing basis, he spends his free evenings searching for comets. Name proposed by the discoverers following a suggestion by Y. Yamada	JPL · 8156
8158 Herder	1989 UH_{7}	Johann Gottfried Herder (1744–1803), German poet, theologian and philosopher	MPC · 8158
8159 Fukuoka	1990 BE_{1}	Takashi Fukuoka (born 1948), director of the planetarium at Sanbe Shizenkan Open Field Museum, Shimane Prefecture, and president of the San-in Society of Astronomy. A hardworking and painstaking planner of astronomy events and workshops, he is particularly concerned with meeting the needs of those new to astronomy in his local area. His main research is luminosity functions of globular clusters. Name proposed by the discoverers following a suggestion by Y. Yamada	JPL · 8159
8160 Petererwin	1990 MG	Peter Erwin, American astronomer.	IAU · 8160
8161 Newman	1990 QP_{3}	Constance B. Newman (born 1935), Smithsonian Institution undersecretary whose unwavering devotion to the principles of exemplary management and diversity has enabled the Smithsonian to flourish and the Astrophysical Observatory to thrive	JPL · 8161
8163 Ishizaki	1990 UF_{2}	Masako Ishizaki (1902–?), Japanese amateur astronomer	MPC · 8163
8164 Andreasdoppler	1990 UO_{3}	Andreas Doppler (born 1963), German amateur astronomer	MPC · 8164
8165 Gnädig	1990 WQ_{3}	Arno Gnädig (born 1956), German amateur astronomer at the Archenhold Observatory (604), Src/Src	MPC · 8165
8166 Buczynski	1991 AH_{1}	Denis Buczynski (born 1951), British amateur astronomer	MPC · 8166
8167 Ishii	1991 CM_{3}	Takahiro Ishii (born 1959), Japanese amateur astronomer and active owner of the Kamogawa Observatory, Chiba Prefecture. He is a strong supporter of neighborhood amateurs, and his contribution to popularizing and disseminating celestial photography techniques makes him welcome in gatherings nationwide. Name proposed by the discoverers following a suggestion by Y. Yamada	JPL · 8167
8168 Rogerbourke	1991 FK_{1}	Roger D. Bourke (born 1938), engineer at JPL who worked on several planetary exploration missions	MPC · 8168
8169 Mirabeau	1991 PO_{2}	Count of Mirabeau (1749–1791), French writer, orator and statesman	MPC · 8169
8171 Stauffenberg	1991 RV_{3}	Claus von Stauffenberg (1907–1944), German aristocrat and Wehrmacht officer, one of the leading figures in the plot to assassinate Adolf Hitler	MPC · 8171
8175 Boerhaave	1991 VV_{5}	Herman Boerhaave (1668–1738), Dutch physician and anatomist	MPC · 8175
8181 Rossini	1992 ST_{26}	Gioachino Rossini (1792–1868), Italian composer	MPC · 8181
8182 Akita	1992 TX	Isao Akita (born 1948), president of the comet observers network in Japan, "Hoshi no Hiroba", since 1988. He is a well-known amateur astronomer and keen observer and photographer of comets and galaxies. He is especially at home assisting in the efforts of other comet enthusiasts, both within his group and throughout the country. Name proposed by the discoverers following a suggestion by Y. Yamada	JPL · 8182
8184 Luderic	1992 WL	Luderic Maury (born 1984) has been an amateur astronomer, eclipse chaser and the joy and pride of his parents ever since his birth in Nice. The number of the minor planet is the sum of 3780 and 4404, the numbers of the minor planets honoring his parents, Carine and Alain Maury.	JPL · 8184
8187 Akiramisawa	1992 XL	Botanist Akira Misawa (1942–1994), a professor at Chiba University, conducted research on the effects of light pollution on plants	JPL · 8187
8188 Okegaya	1992 YE_{3}	Okegaya Marsh, Shizuoka prefecture, Japan	JPL · 8188
8189 Naruke	1992 YG_{3}	Giiti Naruke (born 1949) is the first Japanese to achieve two consecutive wins at the world championship for radio-controlled airplanes, and he is making every endeavor to bring up a future champion	JPL · 8189
8190 Bouguer	1993 ON_{9}	Pierre Bouguer (1698–1758), French mathematician. founder of astronomical photometry	MPC · 8190
8191 Mersenne	1993 OX_{9}	Marin Mersenne (1588–1648), French mathematician, theologian and philosopher	MPC · 8191
8192 Tonucci	1993 RB	Giuseppe Tonucci (1938–1988), Italian cyclist and champion	MPC · 8192
8193 Ciaurro	1993 SF	Ilario Ciaurro (1889–1992), an art teacher and ceramist, but most famous as a painter. His favorite subject was Terni, his adopted town, and he loved using etchings, poems and stories to explore its innermost aspects	JPL · 8193
8194 Satake	1993 SB_{1}	Masaaki Satake (born 1956), a Japanese amateur astronomer and secretary of the Kansai Astronomical Society since 1972. Active in organizing local star parties for amateur astronomers and lay persons alike, he is a part-time journalist rigorous in describing and recording astronomy-related events in his native city of Kyoto. Name proposed by the discoverers following a suggestion by Y. Yamada	JPL · 8194
8195 Tamkin	1993 UC_{1}	Steven M. Tamkin, airline captain and president of the nonprofit Tamkin Foundation.	IAU · 8195
8197 Mizunohiroshi	1993 VX	Hiroshi Mizuno (born 1951), Okayama Seishin University, is a theoretician on the origin of our solar system. He developed a theory about the formation of thick atmospheres of giant planets, such as Jupiter, with intensive studies on the sudden accretion of gas onto the solid core. This mechanism is called the Mizuno process	JPL · 8197
8199 Takagitakeo	1993 XR	Takeo Takagi (1909–1982) played an active part in astronomical education as one of the first planetarians in Japan. In 1939 he joined the staff of the Osaka Electric-Science Museum, famous for its 1937 installation of the first planetarium in Japan. After retiring from the museum, he opened a private planetarium	JPL · 8199
8200 Souten	1994 AY_{1}	Waseda University Astronomy Association, nicknamed "Souten". Established in 1959 by Hidetaka Tojo, Souten has produced an astronaut and many astrophotographers and observers. The discoverers of this minor planet were members of Souten	JPL · 8200

== 8201–8300 ==
back to top

Named minor planet	Provisional	This minor planet was named for...	Ref · Catalog
8202 Gooley	1994 CX_{2}	Barry Gooley (born 1956), president of the astronomy shop Kokusai Kohki in Kyoto.	JPL · 8202
8203 Jogolehmann	1994 CP_{10}	Johann Gottlob Lehmann (1719–1767), a German geologist.	JPL · 8203
8204 Takabatake	1994 GC_{1}	Tohru Takabatake (born 1957), a junior-high-school teacher and secretary of the Okayama Astronomical Society.	JPL · 8204
8205 Van Dijck	1994 PE_{10}	Anthony van Dyck (1599–1641), Flemish painter	MPC · 8205
8206 Masayuki	1994 WK_{1}	Masayuki Okumura (born 1960), a hydrographer for the Japanese Coast Guard. JPL	MPC · 8206
8207 Suminao	1994 YS_{1}	Suminao Murakami (born 1935), the son and grandson of astronomers, is a representative of the Laboratory of Urban Safety Planning in Tokyo and a former professor at the Yokohama National and other Universities.	JPL · 8207
8208 Volta	1995 DL_{2}	Alessandro Volta (1745–1827), Italian physicist and pioneer of electricity and power.	MPC · 8208
8209 Toscanelli	1995 DM_{2}	Paolo dal Pozzo Toscanelli (1397–1482) was an Italian physician, astronomer, cosmographer and mathematician. Columbus may have used his map of the world on the 1492 voyage. Toscanelli was the first to plot observations of comets on star charts, thereby supplying considerably improved information about their sky positions	JPL · 8209
8210 NANTEN	1995 EH	NANTEN, a 4-meter telescope for millimeter and submillimeter wavelengths, is operated by Nagoya University.	JPL · 8210
8212 Naoshigetani	1995 EF_{1}	Naoshige Tani (1925–), a member of the Photovoltaic Popularization Association in Japan and producer of the organization's web site.	JPL · 8212
8214 Mirellalilli	1995 FH	Mirella Lilli (born 1959), wife of Italian discoverer Stefano Mottola, on the occasion of their twentieth wedding anniversary (2007 August)	JPL · 8214
8215 Zanonato	1995 FZ	Flavio Zanonato (born 1950) is a prominent businessman and civic-minded amateur astronomer in his native city of Padova. For the past 15 years he has spearheaded initiatives to restore Padova's great astronomical heritage, e.g., the great clock	JPL · 8215
8216 Melosh	1995 FX_{14}	Jay Melosh (born 1947), of the Lunar and Planetary Laboratory, has worked on the formation of impact craters on the terrestrial planets and the "giant impact" origin of the moon. His "Panspermia" idea involves the ejection by impact of spall products containing microorganisms and their transfer to other planets.	JPL · 8216
8217 Dominikhašek	1995 HC	Dominik Hašek (born 1965), goalkeeper of the Czech Olympic hockey team.	JPL · 8217
8218 Hosty	1996 JH	John Graham Hosty (1949–2001), was the visual discoverer of the nova HS Sge from Huddersfield, West Yorkshire, in 1977. This find, made with a simple 10×50 monocular, encouraged others to join the U.K. Nova Patrol to look for such objects. The name was suggested by G. M. Hurst and B. G. Marsden.	JPL · 8218
8220 Nanyou	1996 JD_{1}	Nanyou, the city where the discoverer lives and his observatory is located.	JPL · 8220
8221 La Condamine	1996 NA_{4}	Charles-Marie de La Condamine (1701–1774), a French naturalist and mathematician.	JPL · 8221
8222 Gellner	1996 OX	František Gellner (1881–1914), a Czech poet and Bohemian anarchist. His poetry depicted, sometimes in shocking ways, night life in a big city. He died in the front lines during World War I.	JPL · 8222
8223 Bradshaw	1996 PD	The Bradshaw mountains, located south of Prescott, Arizona, in the United States. This area of sparsely populated pine-covered mountains provides a dark southern sky for the Prescott Observatory. The mountains themselves were named for William D. Bradshaw, a Western adventurer and miner.	JPL · 8223
8224 Fultonwright	1996 PE	Fulton Wright Jr. (born 1937), a friend of the discoverer, professor at Yavapai College.	JPL · 8224
8225 Emerson	1996 QC	David Emerson (died 1996), lecturer in astrophysics at the Royal Observatory, Edinburgh. His research interests were in the interaction of matter and radiation and star formation. He was director of studies of the first discoverer. Emerson was also an ordained lay-preacher in the Scottish Episcopal Church. He died at a relatively young age on 26 September 1996, just a few weeks after the discovery was made.	JPL · 8225
8229 Kozelský	1996 YU_{2}	Frantisek Kozelský (born 1913), a Czech telescope maker.	JPL · 8229
8230 Perona	1997 TW_{16}	Renato Perona (1927–1984), a track cycling champion.	JPL · 8230
8231 Tetsujiyamada	1997 TX_{17}	Tetsuji Yamada (born 1952), an amateur astronomer.	JPL · 8231
8232 Akiramizuno	1997 UW_{3}	Akira Mizuno (born 1960), professor at Nagoya University.	MPC · 8232
8233 Asada	1997 VZ_{2}	Tadashi Asada (born 1954), professor of computer science at Kyushu International University.	JPL · 8233
8234 Nobeoka	1997 VK_{8}	Nobeoka, a Japanese town in Miyazaki prefecture, at the mouth of the Gokase River. Although it is the site of one of the largest chemical factories in Japan, it remains rich in natural beauty. The sound of the bell at the top of the castle hill is described in a poem by Bokusui Wakayama. Name proposed by the discoverer following a suggestion by T. Sato and R. Ukishima.	JPL · 8234
8235 Fragonard	2096 P-L	Jean-Honoré Fragonard (1732–1806), a French painter and a student of Boucher. Both teacher and pupil painted the colorful world of the Rococo aristocracy. In his landscape paintings Fragonard shows the influence of the Venetian artists.	JPL · 8235
8236 Gainsborough	4040 P-L	Thomas Gainsborough (1727–1788), a British portrait and landscape painter. He was strongly influenced by the Rococo style and Dutch landscape painting, and his work is characterized by luminous colors. His portraits often feature fine landscapes, and he is notable for painting not only the aristocracy of England but also its farmers.	JPL · 8236
8237 Constable	7581 P-L	John Constable (1776–1837), a British landscape painter. A forerunner of the Impressionists of the late nineteenth century, he is notable for his use of color. For some time he made portraits, but later he went back to landscape painting.	JPL · 8237
8238 Courbet	4232 T-1	Gustave Courbet (1819–1877), an autodidact who studied nature and the great paintings in the Louvre.	MPC · 8238
8239 Signac	1153 T-2	Paul Signac (1863–1935) worked together with Seurat to develop the technique of pointillism. For his pointillistic paintings Signac mostly chose water, ships and ports as subjects. After Seurat and Signac not many painters worked in this time-consuming method.	JPL · 8239
8240 Matisse	4172 T-2	Henri Matisse (1869–1954), a French artist who studied at the School of Fine Arts in Paris. After traveling through Europe and the Pacific islands, he initially developed an Impressionistic style of painting. Later he became the leader of a new school, Fauvism, characterized by bold use of color and distorted forms.	JPL · 8240
8241 Agrius	1973 SE_{1}	Agrius, a Greek from Aetolia and father of Thersites. Thersites was the ugliest Greek in Troy.	JPL · 8241
8242 Joshemery	1975 SA_{1}	Joshua P. Emery (born 1973), a minor-planet spectroscopist in the Department of Earth and Planetary Sciences of the University of Tennessee.	JPL · 8242
8243 Devonburr	1975 SF_{1}	Devon M. Burr (born 1966), a geomorphologist in the Department of Earth and Planetary Sciences of the University of Tennessee.	JPL · 8243
8244 Mikolaichuk	1975 TO_{2}	Ivan Vasilievich Mikolaichuk (1941–1987), a talented Ukrainian cinema artist, scenario writer and film director.	JPL · 8244
8245 Molnar	1977 RC_{9}	Lawrence A. Molnar (born 1959), a professor of physics and astronomy and Observatory Director at Calvin College, Grand Rapids, MI.	JPL · 8245
8246 Kotov	1979 QT_{8}	Valerij Aleksandrovich Kotov (born 1943), a Solar physicist, has worked at the Crimean Astrophysical Observatory for more than 30 years. In the early 1970s he pioneered the field of helioseismology, the study of the interior structure and energy sources of the sun and other stars.	JPL · 8246
8247 Cherylhall	1979 SP_{14}	Cheryl L. Hall (born 1945) served the planetary science community from 1987 to 2012 at Cornell University.	JPL · 8247
8248 Gurzuf	1979 TV_{2}	Gurzuf, small town near Yalta at the south coast of the Crimea.	JPL · 8248
8249 Gershwin	1980 GG	George Gershwin (1898–1937), an American composer who was also an accomplished pianist. In his compositions the techniques and forms of art music are blended in varying degrees with the stylistic nuances and techniques of popular music and jazz. The name was suggested by J. Ticha and M. Tichy.	JPL · 8249
8250 Cornell	1980 RP	Cornell University, in Ithaca, New York, on the occasion of its hosting the "Asteroids, Comets, Meteors" conference in July 1999. Cornell was founded by Ezra Cornell in 1865. An acknowledged center for discovery, academic leadership and service, it is, in a very real sense, a world treasure. The university operates the Arecibo Observatory, the premier site for radar astronomy in the world, and it continues to play a leading role in the exploration of minor planets and comets by spacecraft. Name proposed and citation written by J. Veverka.	JPL · 8250
8251 Isogai	1980 VA	Rensuke Isogai (born 1941), a high-school classmate of the discoverer.	JPL · 8251
8252 Elkins-Tanton	1981 EY_{14}	Linda T. Elkins-Tanton (born 1965), the Director of the Department of Terrestrial Magnetism, Carnegie Institution of Washington	JPL · 8252
8253 Brunetto	1981 EU_{15}	Rosario Brunetto (born 1980), an astronomer at the Institut d'Astrophysique Spatiale in Orsay, France, who specializes in laboratory ionization investigations of space weathering processes on minor-planet surfaces.	JPL · 8253
8254 Moskovitz	1981 EF_{18}	Nicholas A. Moskovitz (born 1981), a postdoctoral research scientist at the Carnegie Institution for Science in Washington, DC.	JPL · 8254
8255 Masiero	1981 EZ_{18}	Joseph Masiero (born 1982), an American astronomer and former postdoctoral fellow at the JPL in California. He is a discoverer of minor planets. His 2009 Ph.D. thesis at the University of Hawaii investigated asteroid polarization. Currently he is processing and analyzing minor-planet measurements by the Wide-field Infrared Survey Explorer satellite.	JPL · 8255
8256 Shenzhou	1981 UZ_{9}	Shenzhou spacecraft. "Shenzhou", meaning "Miracle Ship", is used for the first series of Chinese crewed spaceships	JPL · 8256
8257 Andycheng	1982 HO_{1}	Andrew F. Cheng (born 1951), planetary scientist at the Applied Physics Laboratory of Johns Hopkins University. Cheng served as the project scientist on the NEAR mission to (433) Eros and has made significant contributions to a wide variety of solar-system topics, including the study of magnetospheres and investigations of minor-planet surfaces and geodesy using LIDAR techniques. Name proposed by the discoverer and B. E. Clark, and citation written by J. Veverka.	JPL · 8257
8258 McCracken	1982 RW_{1}	Kenneth G. McCracken (born 1933) has done pioneering work in cosmic and X ray astronomy, contributing to the understanding of solar proton events and their propagation in the heliosphere. He designed instruments for four Pioneer and two Explorer mission, and had a leading role in the development of mineral exploration technology.	JPL · 8258
8260 Momcheva	1984 SH	Ivelina Momcheva (born 1980), a Bulgarian astronomer, is known for her research on gravitational lensing and galaxy clusters. While she has already glimpsed the 3D structure of the distant universe through her research, she still hopes to achieve her life goal of glimpsing an antlered moose in the wild.	JPL · 8260
8261 Ceciliejulie	1985 RD	Cecilie Ida and Julie Liv Cetti Hansen (born 1992), twin daughters of Danish astrophysicist Anja C. Andersen; see (8820).	JPL · 8261
8262 Carcich	1985 RG	Brian T. Carcich (born 1956), developer of innovative computer software at Cornell University. Carcich has been responsible for developing key software used to acquire remote sensing data on spacecraft missions to minor planets and comets, including NEAR, Galileo and CONTOUR. Name suggested and citation provided by J. Veverka.	MPC · 8262
8266 Bertelli	1986 TC	Francesco Bertelli (1794–1844), an Italian astronomer at the observatory of Bologna and successor to P. Caturegli (1786–1833) as professor of astronomy at the University of Bologna. Only the first volume of his book, Elementi di Meccanica Celeste, was published at Bologna (1841) before his untimely death. He collaborated in the calculation of the Effemeridi, the annual publication initiated in 1715 by E. Manfredi (1674–1739) and that ceased with Bertelli's death in 1844.	JPL · 8266
8267 Kiss	1986 TX_{3}	John Z. Kiss (born 1960) co-led at NASA an international life science and plant biology project on the ISS. This led to discoveries on multiple light sensory systems in plants, which set the stage for upcoming missions addressing the use of plants in bio-regenerative life support systems for future crewed missions.	JPL · 8267
8268 Goerdeler	1987 SQ_{10}	Carl Friedrich Goerdeler (1884–1945), mayor of the towns of Königsberg and Leipzig, respectively (1920–1937). Early on he opposed the fascist dictatorship. After the outbreak of World War II, he became the leading force behind a Resistance group of conservative-minded Germans, planning a coup d´état against the fascist leader through contacts with a military opposition. Goerdeler's main goal was to restore and institutionalize a state of law. In September 1944, he was condemned to death by the Volksgerichtshof.	JPL · 8268
8269 Calandrelli	1988 QB	Ignazio Calandrelli (1792–1866), Italian astronomer and professor of optics and astronomy in Bologna and Rome	MPC · 8269
8270 Winslow	1989 JF	John Seymour Winslow, a friend of the discoverer's husband, Ron, since grade school.	JPL · 8270
8271 Imai	1989 NY	Yasushi Imai (born 1949) was the president of a planetarium manufacturing company from 1998 to 2009	JPL · 8271
8272 Iitatemura	1989 SG	Iitatemura, village located in Fukushima Prefecture, Japan.	JPL · 8272
8273 Apatheia	1989 WB_{2}	Apatheia is a philosophical word that means "an immovable soul" in Greek philosophy.	JPL · 8273
8274 Soejima	1990 TJ_{1}	Tsutomu Soejima (born 1950), a Japanese amateur astronomer.	JPL · 8274
8275 Inca	1990 VR_{8}	The Inca people of South America.	JPL · 8275
8276 Shigei	1991 FL	Mika Shigei (born 1968), lecturer and curator of the Gotoh Planetarium and Astronomical Museum in Tokyo.	JPL · 8276
8277 Machu-Picchu	1991 GV_{8}	Machu Picchu, "old peak", 2350 meters high, is the site of ancient Inca ruins about 80 km northwest of Cuzco. When he discovered the nearly intact pre-Columbian ruins, Hiram Bingham thought he had found the "lost city of the Incas", but the building style suggests it was the palace of Pachacuti Inca Yupanqui (c. 1438–1471)	JPL · 8277
8278 Ooyanagi	1991 JJ	Yosinori Ooyanagi, Japanese amateur astronomer who lives in Nara City, Nara.	IAU · 8278
8279 Cuzco	1991 PN_{7}	Cusco (Cuzco), the capital of the Inca empire	JPL · 8279
8280 Petergruber	1991 PG_{16}	Budapest-born Peter Gruber (born 1929) arrived in the U.S. in 1951 and built up a successful asset-management business. This enabled him to establish the Gruber Foundation with its principal focus of recognizing notable human achievement, including since 2000 an annual Cosmology Prize in conjunction with the IAU	JPL · 8280
8282 Delp	1991 RR_{40}	Alfred Delp (1907–1945), a German theologian. Beginning in 1942, he was a member of the illegal "Kreisauer Kreis", a group of political conservatives who worked to eliminate the Nazi regime. With this group, Delp collaborated on a first draft of a Christian social order for his country. Following the 1944 attempt on the fascist leader's life, he was condemned to death and executed in February 1945.	JPL · 8282
8283 Edinburgh	1991 SV	Edinburgh, the historic city of Scotland. Long a center of learning, it became the focus of the Scottish Enlightenment in the 18th century. It is the home of the world's largest arts festival, comprising the Edinburgh International Festival and the Fringe. Edinburgh became the first UNESCO City of Literature in 2004.	JPL · 8283
8284 Cranach	1991 TT_{13}	Lucas Cranach the Elder (1472–1553), a German painter, draftsman and copper engraver.	JPL · 8284
8286 Kouji	1992 EK_{1}	Kouji Yamamoto (born 1956), a Japanese architect and amateur astronomer.	JPL · 8286
8289 An-Eefje	1992 JQ_{3}	An and Eefje, two young Belgian women, whose young and hopeful lives came dramatically to an end in 1996. May their memory stand for all women throughout the world who suffer from abuse.	JPL · 8289
8291 Bingham	1992 RV_{1}	Hiram Bingham III (1875–1956), a member of the history faculty at Yale University, went searching for the lost city of the Incas. After tremendous effort he found it---Machu Picchu---high in the Andes, not far from Cuzco, on 1911 July 24.	JPL · 8291
8294 Takayuki	1992 UM_{3}	Takayuki Kawabata (born 1959), president of astronomy shop Planet Town, Kumamoto, Kyushu Island.	JPL · 8294
8295 Toshifukushima	1992 UN_{4}	Toshio Fukushima (born 1954), a Japanese astronomer working mainly on general relativity, positional astronomy and celestial mechanics. He is current president of the IAU Commission 31 and served as chair of the local organizing committee for the IAU General Assembly in Kyoto in 1997. He created the current version of Japanese Ephemeris, published by the Japanese Hydrographic Department, and contributed to the introduction of general relativity into the current IAU system of time systems, reference frames and astronomical constants. He has been the director of the public relations center of the National Astronomical Observatory of Japan since 1998.	JPL · 8295
8296 Miyama	1993 AD	Shoken M. Miyama (born 1951), Japanese astrophysicist working mainly on star and planet formation. He was the principal investigator on the observation team that first detected the protoplanetary disk around a single star using the Nobeyama radio telescope. He was the first director of the public relations center of the National Astronomical Observatory of Japan and since 1996 has been the executive vice-director.	JPL · 8296
8297 Gérardfaure	1993 QJ_{4}	Gérard Fauré, a French amateur astronomer and member of the "Millennium Club". He performs visual estimates of minor planets with magnitude discrepancies, pushing the limiting magnitude with his C8 telescope as far as visual magnitude 16.0 (Magnitude Alert Program). In 1996 he saw his 1000th minor planet visually.	MPC · 8297
8298 Loubna	1993 SQ_{10}	Loubna, a Moroccan-Belgian girl, whose young life came abruptly to an end. May she stand as a symbol for a hopeful life in a multicultural society.	JPL · 8298
8299 Téaleoni	1993 TP_{24}	Téa Leoni (born 1966), American actress, much admired in the futuristic movie Deep Impact (1998). She studied anthropology and psychology.	JPL · 8299
8300 Iga	1994 AO_{2}	Yuichi Iga (born 1955) is a specialist in molecular graphics and medical imaging. As an amateur astronomer, he has been energetically observing Jupiter since 1971. Currently he is secretary of the Jupiter-Saturn Section of the Oriental Astronomical Association.	JPL · 8300

== 8301–8400 ==
back to top

Named minor planet	Provisional	This minor planet was named for...	Ref · Catalog
8301 Haseyuji	1995 BG_{2}	Yuji Hase (1964–2002), an instructor of material technology at Kumamoto technical high school, played a leading role in amateur astronomical computing and was an active founding member of Kumamoto Civil Astronomical Observatory	JPL · 8301
8302 Kazukin	1995 CY	Kazuo Kinoshita (born 1957) is an amateur astronomer and computer programmer. He has contributed to astronomy with his comet and minor planet orbit calculation programs and observation device control programs	JPL · 8302
8303 Miyaji	1995 CO_{1}	Miyaji Takeshi (born 1948) is an astronomer specializing in radio astronomy and VLBI. He is among the members of the National Astronomical Observatory of Japan promoting the VLBI Exploration of Radio Astrometry and VLBI Space Observatory Program plans of the Institute of Space and Astronautical Science	JPL · 8303
8304 Ryomichico	1995 DJ_{1}	Ryo Michico (born 1955) is a novelist and poet respected for her beautiful science fantasies. Her best-known works are Asteroid Museum (1990) and Radio-star Restaurant (1991)	JPL · 8304
8305 Teika	1995 DQ_{1}	Fujiwara-no-Teika (1162–1241) was a Japanese literary figure who wrote many famous short poems. In his book Meigetsuki ("Bright Moon Diary") he discussed the 1054 supernova, which had been recorded by early astronomers in the Orient	JPL · 8305
8306 Shoko	1995 DY_{1}	Shoko Sawada (born 1962), Japanese singer and songwriter. Since her debut in 1979, she has released 52 singles and 22 albums, ranging from touching ballads to rhythmical pop songs. Her recordings have fascinated many fans in Japan, including the discoverer of this minor planet	JPL · 8306
8307 Peltan	1995 EN	The Peltans, the family of discoverer Jana Tichá (née Peltanová), including her mother Marie (née Kosová) Peltanová (born 1930), her father Bohuslav Peltan (1927–1983), her brother Jiří Peltan (born 1953), her sister-in-law Adéla (born 1951) and her nephews Petr (born 1983) and Libor (born 1989).	JPL · 8307
8308 Julie-Mélissa	1996 HD_{13}	Julie Lejeune and Mélissa Russo (both age 8), two Belgian children who were murdered tragically in 1996, symbolizing all innocent children suffering from abuse.	JPL · 8308
8309 Jedidahisler	1996 NL_{1}	Jedidah Isler, American astrophysicist and policy maker who was the first African American woman to complete her Ph.D. in astrophysics at Yale University.	IAU · 8309
8310 Seelos	1996 PL_{2}	Frank P. Seelos IV who, as a student at Wolford College, participated in the 1998 Caltech Summer Undergraduate Research Fellow program. He assisted and carried out research with the Near-Earth Asteroid Tracking program at the Jet Propulsion Laboratory and developed the software package HAVANA, which rapidly accesses images of specified objects from the extensive observational archive available. Frank is an outstanding student with a double major in physics and mathematics	JPL · 8310
8311 Zhangdaning	1996 TV_{1}	Daning Zhang (born 1944), physician and vice-president of Tianjin Traditional Chinese Medicine (TCM) Hospital, professor of Tianjin Medical University, guest professor of Taiwan Chinese Academic College, chairman of the International TCM Kidney Diseases Conference. As the founder of the kidney diseases practice of TCM, he has won many international awards. He has written more than 60 publications on kidney disease	JPL · 8311
8313 Christiansen	1996 YU_{1}	Wilbur N. Christiansen (born 1913), foreign member of the Chinese Academy of Sciences and unfailing friend of Chinese astronomers. A pioneer in radio astronomy, he invented and developed a series of radio telescopes that in their time provided the highest angular resolution. These were the "grating telescope", the "grating cross" and the "rotational synthesis telescope". His textbook on radio telescopes, with Högbom, was translated into Russian and Chinese. Immediately after the discovery of the 21-cm hydrogen line in space, he confirmed this and went on to make the first map that showed we live in a spiral galaxy. He served as a vice president of the IAU and as president of URSI, and he is now an honorary president of URSI	JPL · 8313
8314 Tsuji	1997 US_{8}	Takashi Tsuji (born 1937), Japanese astronomer working mainly on stellar atmospheres and spectroscopy. His major interest extends from cool luminous stars such as red giants, supergiants and carbon stars to very low luminous objects, including brown dwarfs. He received the academy prize of the Japan Academy in 1984 for "Theoretical studies of the outer layers of cool stars". He served as the director of the Institute of Astronomy, Faculty of Science, University of Tokyo, during 1992–1996. He has been professor emeritus of the University of Tokyo since 1998	JPL · 8314
8315 Bajin	1997 WA_{22}	Ba Jin (1904–2005), Chinese writer.	JPL · 8315
8316 Wolkenstein	3002 P-L	Oswald von Wolkenstein (?1377–1445), one of the last minstrels. We know much about his life and times from his own songs, which have been preserved. At the age of ten he became shield-bearer for a knight and traveled throughout the world as a groom, cook and singer, eventually returning to his home castle of Wolkenstein in the Grödner valley in Tirol. He was also ambassador to the emperor Sigismund and traveled to England and the Iberian peninsula in his name. Especially interesting are his financial documents, which have all been saved and show the difficult position of knights around 1400	JPL · 8316
8317 Eurysaces	4523 P-L	Eurysaces, from Greek mythology, the son of Ajax by Tecmessa, known for his enormous shield.	JPL · 8317
8318 Averroes	1306 T-2	Averroes (1126–1198) was a medieval Islamic philosopher, whose Arabian name was Ibn Roschd Abdul Walid and who studied law and medicine in Córdoba. He brought together the philosophy of Aristotle, Islam and Christianity. Both Islam and the Christian church, especially Thomas Aquinas, condemned him. Most of his publications have been translated into Latin.	JPL · 8318
8319 Antiphanes	3365 T-2	Antiphanes (408–330 B.C.) was a Greek comic poet. Today 119 complete titles and about 300 fragments are known. He wrote parodies of Sophocles, Euripides and many different characters and professions.	JPL · 8319
8320 van Zee	1955 RV	Liese van Zee (born 1970), on the faculty of Indiana University, has investigated the links between star formation, elemental enrichment and the gas distribution and kinematics in star-forming galaxies. Her work focuses on star-formation history and evolution of dwarf galaxies, including stellar-population models	JPL · 8320
8321 Akim	1977 EX	Efraim Lazarevich Akim (born 1929), deputy director at the Keldysh Institute of Applied Mathematics, is an outstanding scientist in applied celestial mechanics to the Moon and planets and the determination of parameters of the Solar System	JPL · 8321
8322 Kononovich	1978 RL_{1}	Aleksandr Kononovich (1850–1910) was a professor at Novorossisk University and head of the Odessa Astronomical Observatory for many years. A pioneer in astrophysics, he is known for his photometric observations of the planets, photographic observations of the Sun and research on solar prominences.	JPL · 8322
8323 Krimigis	1979 UH	Stamatios Krimigis (born 1938), a Greek-born American physicist, head of the Space Department of the Applied Physics Laboratory of Johns Hopkins University and a specialist in solar, interplanetary and magnetospheric physics. Krimigis has been principal investigator or coinvestigator on several space experiments, including the Low Energy Charged Particle experiments on Voyagers 1 and 2 and the Active Magnetospheric Particle Tracer Explorers. He spearheaded the establishment of NASA's Discovery program, and his department is managing NEAR, the first Discovery mission.	JPL · 8323
8324 Juliadeleón	1981 DF_{2}	Julia de León Cruz (born 1977), an astronomer at the Instituto de Astrofisica de Andalucia in Granada, Spain.	JPL · 8324
8325 Trigo-Rodriguez	1981 EM_{26}	Josep Maria Trigo-Rodriguez (born 1970) is a Consejo Superior de Investigaciones Científicas research scientist at the Institute of Space Studies of Catalonia.	JPL · 8325
8326 Paulkling	1981 JS_{2}	Paul Kling, mayor of the city of Nördlingen, Germany, where the Nördlinger Ries Crater is located. He has successfully guided the prosperity and well-being of this ancient, walled Bavarian city as it has grown and developed and enters the twenty-first century.	JPL · 8326
8327 Weihenmayer	1981 JE_{3}	Erik Weihenmayer (born 1968), sightless since age 13, holds the unique distinction of being the first blind mountain climber to conquer Mount Everest. His sense of adventure, courage, fortitude and perseverance have also led him to the summits of Denali, Kilimanjaro and Aconcagua.	JPL · 8327
8328 Uyttenhove	1981 QQ_{2}	Jozef Uyttenhove (born 1944), a Belgian (Flemish) physicist and historian of the exact sciences, who, during the nineteenth and twentieth centuries, has recently retired as a professor of physics and as director of the Museum for the History of Sciences at the University of Ghent.	JPL · 8328
8329 Speckman	1982 FP_{3}	Mark Speckman (born 1955), American handicapped football coach at Willamette University, was born without hands. He has turned his physical handicap into positive affirmation, touching many with his uplifting story about never giving up, helping others and always doing the very best you can regardless of the circumstances.	JPL · 8329
8330 Fitzroy	1982 FX_{3}	Robert FitzRoy (1805–1865), British naval officer, hydrographer and meteorologist, captain of HMS Beagle, governor of New Zealand (1843–1848) and in 1854 established and directed what is now the British Meteorological Office.	JPL · 8330
8331 Dawkins	1982 KK_{1}	Richard Dawkins (born 1941), British evolutionary biologist and chaired professor at Oxford University, is the author of the seminal work The Selfish Gene (1976) and other best-selling books on science and evolution. His novel concept of the ethology of genes revolutionized the study of evolution and animal behavior. He is the former husband of actress Lalla Ward.	JPL · 8331
8332 Ivantsvetaev	1982 TL_{2}	Ivan Vladimirovich Tsvetaev (1847–1913), a Russian art critic, professor of philology at the universities in Warsaw, Kiev, Moscow and St. Petersburg.	MPC · 8332
8333 Medina	1982 VF	Francisco Medina (born 1952) co-led at ESA an international life science and plant biology project on the ISS. This led to discoveries on multiple light sensory systems in plants, which set the stage for upcoming missions addressing the use of plants in bio-regenerative life support systems for future crewed missions.	JPL · 8333
8335 Sarton	1984 DD_{1}	George Sarton (1884–1956), Belgian-born American mathematician and author, founder of the magazines Isis and Osiris who moved to the U.S. in 1915. Author of influential books and a professor at Harvard University, he is credited with introducing the history of science as an important field of study in the U.S.	JPL · 8335
8336 Šafařík	1984 SK_{1}	Vojtěch Šafařík (1829–1902), Czech astronomer known for his work in inorganic chemistry, Czech chemical nomenclature and textbooks, as well as for his observations of variable stars. He obtained about 20,000 observations of variable stars. This minor planet also honors the memory of his wife and co-worker Paulína Šafaříková (1836–1920), who was interested in the history and popularization of astronomy. Name suggested by J. Ticha and M. Tichy.	JPL · 8336
8338 Ralhan	1985 FE_{3}	Philip Ralhan Bidstrup (born 1979), a Danish physicist. H obtained a doctorate from the University of Copenhagen in 2008 based on a feasibility study for detecting and observing small minor planets by a spacecraft in deep space. The name was suggested by A. C. Andersen.	JPL · 8338
8339 Kosovichia	1985 RM_{6}	Aleksandr Grigorievich Kosovichev (born 1953), solar physicist and helioseismologist, has worked at the Crimean Astrophysical Observatory and at Stanford University. The naming also honors his wife, Tatiana Vladimirovna Kosovicheva, a doctor who worked in the Crimean Astrophysical Observatory's medical office	JPL · 8339
8340 Mumma	1985 TS_{1}	Michael J. Mumma (born 1941), a researcher at NASA's Goddard Space Flight Center, has identified water, methanol, methane, acetylene and ethane in the infrared spectra of comets, and his work on comets as x-ray objects has helped provide a new probe for the solar wind.	JPL · 8340
8343 Tugendhat	1986 TG_{3}	Villa Tugendhat is one of the most magnificent pieces of modern Czech architecture located in Brno. It was built by Mies van der Rohe in 1930 as a family villa of great elegance, following the idea of freely floating space. The name was suggested by J. Ticha.	JPL · 8343
8344 Babette	1987 BB	Babette Whipple (1918–), American teacher, researcher, psychotherapist, and wife of astronomer Fred L. Whipple	JPL · 8344
8345 Ulmerspatz	1987 BO_{1}	The Ulmer Spatz (sparrow) is a copper statuette originally on top of the roof of the cathedral of Ulm. The legend goes that a sparrow, building its nest, showed the builders of Ulm how to move a large beam through a small entrance door	JPL · 8345
8347 Lallaward	1987 HK	Lalla Ward (born 1951), a British actress and former wife of Richard Dawkins. Best known for her role as Romana in the long-running British sci-fi TV series Doctor Who.	JPL · 8347
8348 Bhattacharyya	1988 BX	Jagadish Chandra Bhattacharyya (born 1930), an Indian astronomer and director of the Indian Institute of Astrophysics in Bangalore, participated in the discoveries of the atmosphere of Jupiter III (Ganymede) and the rings of Uranus. Also an eminent solar astronomer, he was director of the Indian Institute of Astrophysics in Bangalore and was instrumental in the completion of the Vainu Bappu telescope at Kavalur.	JPL · 8348
8353 Megryan	1989 GC_{4}	Meg Ryan (born 1961), an American actress who majored in journalism. She showed her talent in the feature film You've got Mail (1999).	JPL · 8353
8355 Masuo	1989 RQ_{1}	Masuo Tanaka (born 1955), a Japanese Infrared astronomer, is a researcher at the Institute of Astronomy, University of Tokyo. His research interests include excitation of infrared molecular hydrogen emission, ices in molecular clouds, final-stage evolution of massive stars, and mass loss from massive stars.	JPL · 8355
8356 Wadhwa	1989 RO_{2}	Meenakshi Wadhwa, known as Mini to her friends. Mini's studies of the microdistribution of trace elements in all known martian meteorites have led to a better understanding of the origin of these rocks and have contributed to the igneous history of planet Mars. Her use of extinct and long-lived radioisotopes to decipher the chronology of meteorites is bringing new insights into the formation of a variety of objects from different asteroidal bodies. As Curator of Meteorites, Minerals and Gems at the Field Museum of Natural History, she is actively involved in public education about meteorites and their parent asteroids. Citation prepared by M. S. Robinson at the request of C. S. Shoemaker	JPL · 8356
8357 O'Connor	1989 SC_{1}	J. Dennis O'Connor (born 1942), internationally acknowledged biological scientist, provost and staunch proponent of research excellence at the Smithsonian Institution, and resolute champion of the programs of the Astrophysical Observatory	JPL · 8357
8358 Rickblakley	1989 VN_{5}	Rick Blakley (born 1949), mechanical, structural and optical engineer who has designed instrumentation for several large telescopes including the stereomicroscope used by the Shoemaker-Levy Double Cometograph	JPL · 8358
8367 Bokusui	1990 UL_{2}	Bokusui Wakayama (1885–1928), one of the most beloved of Japanese poets. Born in a village in Miyazaki Prefecture, he graduated from the nearby Nobeoka Middle School and later from Waseda University. Fond of both travel and sake, he wrote many poems about the joys and sorrows of life and nature. After his death, his complete works were published in 13 volumes. Name proposed by the discoverer following a suggestion by R. Ukishima and T. Sato.	JPL · 8367
8368 Lamont	1991 DM	Johann von Lamont (1805–1879) was born in Scotland but moved to Bavaria to be educated. He became director of the Bogenhausen Observatory and Astronomer Royal of Bavaria. Initially studying positional astronomy, he later developed a network of meteorological and magnetic stations throughout Europe.	JPL · 8368
8369 Miyata	1991 GR	Takashi Miyata (born 1971), an associate professor of astronomy at the Institute of Astronomy, University of Tokyo.	JPL · 8369
8370 Vanlindt	1991 RK_{11}	Marianne Van Lindt (born 1941) is a well-known Belgian artist of impressionistic aquarels and oil paintings. Her home in Antwerp is a place of social encounters among artists, scientists and musicians	JPL · 8370
8371 Goven	1991 TJ_{14}	Goven, a village in Brittany, France, is the home of the Bernardinis, who were an extraordinary host family for the discoverer during his year-long stay there. Jean-Paul Bernardini served as a navigator in the French Marine during the 1960s, frequently practising the dying art of celestial navigation	JPL · 8371
8373 Stephengould	1992 AB	Stephen Jay Gould (1941–2002) was a biologist, geologist and historian of science at Harvard, but he may be best known for his long-running series of reflective articles in Natural History in which he has articulated his view of evolution. In 1972, working with Niles Eldredge, he developed his idea of "punctuated equilibrium".	JPL · 8373
8374 Horohata	1992 AK_{1}	Horohata is an open area in Ishikawa town, Fukushima prefecture, 250 km north of Tokyo. A large star party is held there each autumn	JPL · 8374
8375 Kenzokohno	1992 AP_{1}	Kenzo Kohno (born 1934), Japanese staff member of Akashi Planetarium since 1960 and its director from 1982 to 1995. He served as president of the Japan Planetarium Society from 1983 to 1984. In 1981, he was awarded the Minister's Prize by the Japanese Ministry of Education. Name proposed by the discoverer following a suggestion by T. Sato and A. Fujii.	JPL · 8375
8377 Elmerreese	1992 SD_{1}	Elmer J. Reese (born 1919), American amateur astronomer, was an important contributing observer in the early years of the Association of Lunar and Planetary Observers, serving on its volunteer staff. His hypothesis of subsurface sources to explain the South Equatorial belt disturbances at the cloud deck on Jupiter is well known	JPL · 8377
8378 Sweeney	1992 SN_{1}	Donal F. Sweeney (born 1933) was director of the Jet Propulsion Laboratory's Occupational Health Services during 1990–2000	JPL · 8378
8379 Straczynski	1992 SW_{10}	J. Michael Straczynski (born 1954), creator, executive producer, and writer of Babylon 5, an award-winning science-fiction novel for television that chronicles the story of the last of a series of space stations, the last best hope for peace in the galaxy. Straczynski has been involved in genre television for many years, editing and writing for a number of popular series. He has also published many short stories, an anthology and two fantasy/horror novels. Straczynski's primary criterion for a good science-fiction television series is that it must be good science fiction and good television. Name proposed by J. Scotti, W. Bottke and D. Durda. Citation by D. Durda.	JPL · 8379
8380 Tooting	1992 SW_{17}	Tooting, a suburb of London. Tooting's postal code is SW17. Name suggested by E. Bowell, who lived in Tooting for 13 years as a youngster	JPL · 8380
8381 Hauptmann	1992 SO_{24}	Gerhart Hauptmann (1862–1946), a German dramatist writer and leading personality in the field of German naturalism. His work frequently depicts social problems and the ups and downs of life, often viewed from his homeland of Silesia. Beginning in 1904, he lived on Hiddensee, a small island in the Baltic Sea, where he was also buried. Hauptmann was honored with the 1912 Nobel Prize in literature.	JPL · 8381
8382 Mann	1992 SQ_{26}	Thomas Mann (1875–1955) and his brother Heinrich Mann (1871–1950), both prominent German writers and social critics, were born in the Hanseatic town of Lübeck. In 1930, Heinrich became director of the section "Art of Creative Writing" of the Prussian Academy of Sciences. Thomas received the 1929 Nobel Prize for literature. After emigrating in 1933, they later settled in the United States.	JPL · 8382
8386 Vanvinckenroye	1993 BB_{6}	The Vanvinckenroyes are a well-known family of five organists in Antwerp and Limburg. The most famous of them is the composer Jef Vanvinckenroye (born 1939), a very good friend of the discoverer	JPL · 8386
8387 Fujimori	1993 DO	Kenichi Fujimori (born 1934), an amateur astronomer who observes sunspots, faculae and prominences. A formal observer designated by the Sunspot Index Data Center, he served as director of the solar section of the Oriental Astronomical Association from 1971 to 1978. Name proposed by the discoverer following a suggestion by T. Sato and A. Fujii.	JPL · 8387
8391 Kring	1993 HH_{3}	David A. Kring (born 1961) of the Lunar and Planetary Laboratory is a prolific geologist and meteoriticist who has studied the mineralogy of meteorites and the structure of terrestrial impact craters, particularly the Chicxulub crater, playing an important role in determining its origin and relationship to the K-T extinction event.	JPL · 8391
8393 Tetsumasakamoto	1993 TJ_{1}	Tetsuma Sakamoto (1908–), Japanese agricultural scientist and specialist in sericultural technology, has been an amateur astronomer since 1923. He has enthusiastically observed sunspots, meteors, zodiacal light, the gegenschein and artificial satellites	JPL · 8393
8395 Rembaut	1993 TQ_{23}	Peter Rembaut (1966–1997), industrial engineer at the electronic laboratory at the Royal Observatory at Uccle, who died in 1997. Of great help to the discoverer for improving the software for the Zeiss comparator-measuring device, he was esteemed by everyone at the observatory for his kindness and ability	JPL · 8395
8397 Chiakitanaka	1993 XO	Chiaki Tanaka (born 1953) is a Japanese astronomical photographer and writer of books and articles in astronomical magazines. His name often appears in the list of judges for stellar photographic contests in magazines.	JPL · 8397
8398 Rubbia	1993 XY	Carlo Rubbia (born 1934), Italian physicist and 1984 Nobel Prize laureate in physics for his decisive contribution to the large project that led to the discovery of the field particles W and Z, communicators of weak interaction. His discovery has supplied a fundamental check of the unified theory of electro-weak interactions. He is the fourth Italian Nobel laureate in physics.	JPL · 8398
8399 Wakamatsu	1994 AD	Ken-ichi Wakamatsu (born 1942) is a professor at Gifu University and serves as the vice-president of the Astronomical Society of Japan. He has studied the structure and dynamics of clusters of galaxies in optical and radio ranges, and he also worked on an 11-m radio telescope for e-VLBI network in Japan	JPL · 8399
8400 Tomizo	1994 AQ	Okamoto Tomizo (born 1933) joined the Tokyo Astronomical Observatory in 1954 to observe the solar corona and flare phenomenon at the Norikura Solar Observatory. After his 1994 retirement, he helped popularize astronomy as a member of the Public Information Office at the National Astronomical Observatory of Japan	JPL · 8400

== 8401–8500 ==
back to top

Named minor planet	Provisional	This minor planet was named for...	Ref · Catalog
8401 Assirelli	1994 DA	Giuseppe Assirelli (1950–1998), an Italian photographer, known for his exhibitions and for his many books of photographs, depicting the beauty of his land, his town, his river and his people.	JPL · 8401
8403 Minorushimizu	1994 JG	Minoru Shimizu (born 1928) worked at the Tokyo Astronomical Observatory for 40 years, first with the solar-tower telescope at Mitaka (participating in several eclipse expeditions) and later as chief of the technical staff at Okayama. He also worked at Kiso, as well as at public observatories like Bisei, Rikubetsu and Gunma.	JPL · 8403
8405 Asbolus	1995 GO	Asbolus (The "black one") from Greek mythology, was the centaur who supposedly made forecasts from the flight formations of birds. He caused the battle between the centaurs and Heracles and thus was indirectly responsible for the deaths of Pholus and Chiron.	JPL · 8405
8406 Iwaokusano	1995 HJ	Iwao Kusano (1908–1999), an orthopedist and an amateur astronomer.	JPL · 8406
8407 Houlahan	1995 ON	Padraig Houlahan (born 1958), a computer expert at various institutions, lately at Lowell Observatory.	JPL · 8407
8408 Strom	1995 SX_{12}	Robert G. Strom (born 1933) studied the cratering record on the terrestrial planets and their satellites at the Lunar and Planetary Laboratory. He participated in both crewed and uncrewed exploration of the solar system and has searched for evidence of ancient oceans and ice sheets on Mars.	JPL · 8408
8409 Valentaugustus	1995 WB_{43}	Valentin Augustus Weber (1867–1940) was a grandfather of the team leader. Born in Germany, he moved to the U.S. in 1889, where he designed and constructed stained-glass windows for cathedrals and mahogany furniture for his friends and neighbors in Brooklyn, New York.	JPL · 8409
8410 Hiroakiohno	1996 QZ_{1}	Hiroaki Ohno (born 1948), Japanese director of the Hoshinomura Observatory located in the Fukushima prefecture.	JPL · 8410
8411 Celso	1996 TO	Celso Macor (1925–1998), a poet in the Italian region of Friuli, gave voice to the little things that form our everyday lives.	JPL · 8411
8412 Zhaozhongxian	1996 TM_{6}	Zhao Zhongxian (born 1941) is a leading physicist and an Academician of the Chinese Academy of Sciences. He has made significant contributions to the study of high temperature superconductivity, and has won many prestigious awards, including the State Preeminent Science and Technology Award of China in 2016.	JPL · 8412
8413 Kawakami	1996 TV_{10}	Isamu Kawakami (born 1948), a member of Shirakawa Observatory in Japan and Chiro Observatory in Australia.	JPL · 8413
8414 Atsuko	1996 TW_{10}	Atsuko Tsuji (born 1953), a science journalist from Asahi Shinbun.	JPL · 8414
8416 Okada	1996 VB_{8}	Yoshiyuki Okada (born 1947), a member of Shirakawa Observatory in Japan and Chiro Observatory in Australia.	JPL · 8416
8417 Lancetaylor	1996 VG_{8}	Lance Taylor (born 1956) is a science educator who teaches at high school and college in Western Australia. He is a leading member of Chiro Observatory, established and jointly operated by Australian and Japanese amateur astronomers.	JPL · 8417
8418 Mogamigawa	1996 VS_{30}	Mogami River (Mogami-gawa), the longest river in the discoverer's home prefecture of Yamagata. One of the three wildest rivers in Japan, Mogamigawa has its source in Mt. Azuma, south of Yamagata. It flows north and pours into the Sea of Japan in Sakata City. Called "Mother River", it is very popular in this area.	JPL · 8418
8419 Terumikazumi	1996 VK_{38}	Terumi Akiyama (born 1947) and Kazumi Akiyama (born 1952), brothers and members of Shirakawa Observatory in Japan and Chiro Observatory in Australia.	JPL · 8419
8420 Angrogna	1996 WQ	Angrogna, an Italian village nestled in the Cottian Alps, Piedmont, where the discoverer's paternal ancestors were born and lived for at least six generations.	JPL · 8420
8421 Montanari	1996 XA_{9}	Geminiano Montanari (1633–1687), Italian mathematician	MPC · 8421
8422 Mohorovičıć	1996 XJ_{26}	Andrija Mohorovičić (1857–1936), a Croatian Austro-Hungarian seismologist, researched seismic wave propagation and epicenter determination. After the 1909 earthquake in Croatia he determined the discontinuity that divides the crust of the earth and the mantle that today is called MOHO.	JPL · 8422
8423 Macao	1997 AO_{22}	Macau, the beautiful peninsula near Zhuhai.	JPL · 8423
8424 Toshitsumita	1997 CP	Tsumita Toshi-hisa (born 1924) joined the Solar Physics Division of the Tokyo Astronomical Observatory in 1950 to study and observe the sun. After retiring in 1987, he contributed to the popularization of astronomy as a member of the Public Information Office at the National Astronomical Observatory of Japan.	JPL · 8424
8425 Zirankexuejijin	1997 CJ_{29}	The concatenation Zi Ran, Ke Xue, Ji Jin, or "Nature", "Science", "Fund", is derived from Guo Jia Zi Ran Ke Xue Ji Jin Wei Yuan Hui, "The National Science Foundation of China", which is celebrating its fifteenth anniversary. The Foundation provides support for the Xinglong program.	JPL · 8425
8428 Okiko	1997 VJ_{8}	Okiko Seki (born 1941), a Kochi native wife of Japanese discoverer Tsutomu Seki.	JPL · 8428
8430 Florey	1997 YB_{5}	Howard Florey (1898–1968), Australian pharmacologist and pathologist who shared the 1945 Nobel Prize for physiology and medicine.	MPC · 8430
8431 Haseda	1997 YQ_{13}	Haseda Kastumi (born 1945) is a Japanese amateur astronomer in Aichi prefecture. During 2000–2002 he discovered the four novae V463 Sct, V1178 Sco, V2540 Oph and V4743 Sgr. He has also discovered 65 new variables, including some Wolf-Rayet stars.	JPL · 8431
8432 Tamakasuga	1997 YD_{18}	Ryoji Matsumoto (born 1972), Japanese sumo wrestler whose professional name is Tamakasuga.	JPL · 8432
8433 Brachyrhynchus	2561 P-L	Pink-footed goose (Anser brachyrhynchus), a migratory goose, wintering in northwestern Europe	JPL · 8433
8434 Columbianus	6571 P-L	Tundra swan (Cygnus columbianus), the smallest of the Holarctic swans	JPL · 8434
8435 Anser	6643 P-L	Greylag goose (Anser anser), a member of the waterfowl family Anatidae	JPL · 8435
8436 Leucopsis	2259 T-1	Barnacle goose (Branta leucopsis), medium-sized goose with a white face and black head, neck, and upper breast	JPL · 8436
8437 Bernicla	3057 T-1	Brent goose (Branta bernicla), a small goose after the Brent System oilfield in North America is named	JPL · 8437
8438 Marila	4825 T-1	Greater scaup (Aythya marila), a mid-sized diving duck	JPL · 8438
8439 Albellus	2034 T-2	Smew (Mergellus albellus), a species of duck	JPL · 8439
8440 Wigeon	1017 T-3	Wigeon (Anas penelope), a dabbling duck	JPL · 8440
8441 Lapponica	4008 T-3	Bar-tailed godwit (Limosa lapponica), a large wader bird	JPL · 8441
8442 Ostralegus	4237 T-3	Eurasian oystercatcher (Haematopus ostralegus), a wader in the oystercatcher bird family	JPL · 8442
8443 Svecica	4343 T-3	Bluethroat (Luscinia svecica), a small passerine bird	JPL · 8443
8444 Popovich	1969 TR_{1}	Pavel Popovich (1930–2009), was Soviet cosmonaut and specialist in space engineering, participated in the flights of Vostok 4, Soyuz 14 and Salyut 3. He was the first person admitted to the cosmonaut detachment in 1960 and one of the first six candidates selected for training for the first space flights.	JPL · 8444
8445 Novotroitskoe	1973 QG_{2}	This minor planet is being named on the occasion of the 50th anniversary of the signing of the friendship agreement between Novotroitskyi Raion, the district center of the Kherson Oblast in Ukraine, and the town of Genichesk, Ukraine.	JPL · 8445
8446 Tazieff	1973 SB_{6}	Haroun Tazieff (1914–1998), Polish-born Belgian and French geologist, volcanologist and writer, was the author of books and films about volcanoes and earthquakes. An outstanding connoisseur of volcanoes, he was one of the best popularizers of earth science.	JPL · 8446
8447 Cornejo	1974 OE	Antonio Cornejo, Argentinian founder and director of the Galileo Galilei planetarium in Buenos Aires	JPL · 8447
8448 Belyakina	1976 UT_{1}	Tamara Sergeevna Belyakina (born 1934), astrophysicist and stellar photometrist who worked at the Crimean Astrophysical Observatory from 1955 to 1990. She is known for her multicolor photometric observations of symbiotic stars. She first discovered nonradial pulsations of red giants in such systems and proposed the interpretation of this phenomenon.	JPL · 8448
8449 Maslovets	1977 EO_{1}	Bogdan Pavlovich Maslovets (born 1940), an electrical engineer at Zaporozhye Transformer Works in Ukraine, began his career at this plant in 1962 as a foreman and later become one of the leaders of the enterprise.	JPL · 8449
8450 Egorov	1977 QL_{1}	Vsevolod Aleksandrovich Egorov (1930–2001) was one of the founders of the modern theory of the space flight dynamics. One of the leading researchers at the Keldysh Institute of Applied Mathematics and a professor at Moscow University, he was a pioneer in studying trajectories from the earth to the moon.	JPL · 8450
8451 Gaidai	1977 RY_{6}	Leonid Gaidai (1923–1993), a prominent Soviet film producer and Peoples' Artist of the U.S.S.R.	JPL · 8451
8452 Clay	1978 WB	Landon and Livinia Clay, steadfast friends of science and the arts, Harvard University and the Smithsonian Institution. They are in particular enthusiastic and penetratingly knowledgeable supporters of astronomy, conservation biology and mathematics.	JPL · 8452
8453 Flaviataldini	1981 EQ	Flavia Taldini (b. 2020) is the grand-daughter of Mario Di Martino, astronomer at the Turin Astrophysical Observatory and colleague and friend of the discoverers.	IAU · 8453
8454 Micheleferrero	1981 EG_{1}	Michele Ferrero (1925–2015), an Italian entrepreneur, who put proceeds of his success into a foundation active in the fields of welfare, culture and art.	JPL · 8454
8455 Johnrayner	1981 ER_{6}	John T. Rayner (born 1954), an astronomer at the University of Hawaii's Institute for Astronomy and deputy director of the NASA Infrared Telescope Facility on Mauna Kea, Hawaii.	JPL · 8455
8456 Davegriep	1981 EJ_{7}	David M. Griep (born 1957) has been a telescope operator for the NASA Infrared Telescope Facility on Mauna Kea, Hawaii, since 1982.	JPL · 8456
8457 Billgolisch	1981 EO_{8}	William F. Golisch (born 1958) has been a telescope operator for the NASA Infrared Telescope Facility on Mauna Kea, Hawaii, since 1984.	JPL · 8457
8458 Georgekoenig	1981 EY_{9}	George Koenig (born 1945), the observatory superintendent for the NASA Infrared Telescope Facility on Mauna Kea, Hawaii.	JPL · 8458
8459 Larsbergknut	1981 EQ_{18}	Lars V. Bergknut (born 1947), the observatory foreman and instrument technician for the NASA Infrared Telescope Facility on Mauna Kea, Hawaii.	JPL · 8459
8460 Imainamahoe	1981 EP_{19}	Imai Namahoe (born 1954), an electronics technician for the NASA Infrared Telescope Facility on Mauna Kea, Hawaii.	JPL · 8460
8461 Sammiepung	1981 EC_{21}	Sammie J. Pung (born 1958) is a mechanical technician for the NASA Infrared Telescope Facility on Mauna Kea, Hawaii.	JPL · 8461
8462 Hazelsears	1981 ED_{22}	Hazel Sears (born 1948), managing editor of Meteoritics and Planetary Science (1990–2000) and subsequently Meteorite magazine.	JPL · 8462
8463 Naomimurdoch	1981 EM_{27}	Naomi Murdoch (born 1984) completed her Ph.D. at The Open University, United Kingdom in 2012. Using microgravity flight experiments and numerical modeling, she investigated the behavior of granular material under minor-planet-like low-gravity surface conditions.	JPL · 8463
8464 Polishook	1981 EF_{28}	David Polishook (born 1976), Israeli astronomer and a Postdoctoral Fellow at the Massachusetts Institute of Technology and Tel Aviv University. He is also a discoverer of minor planets.	JPL · 8464
8465 Bancelin	1981 EQ_{31}	David Bancelin (born 1978), an astronomer at the "Institut de mécanique céleste et de calcul des éphémérides" at the Paris Observatory.	JPL · 8465
8466 Leyrat	1981 EV_{34}	Cedric Leyrat (born 1978), an astronomer at the Paris Observatory in Meudon.	JPL · 8466
8467 Benoîtcarry	1981 ES_{35}	Benoît Carry (born 1983), a Research Fellow at the European Space Astronomy Centre, Spain. His 2009 University of Paris Ph.D. research and ongoing investigations specialize in the physical properties of minor planets as measured from high angular-resolution imaging.	JPL · 8467
8468 Rhondastroud	1981 EA_{40}	Rhonda M. Stroud (born 1971), a planetary scientist at the Naval Research Laboratory.	JPL · 8468
8470 Dudinskaya	1982 SA_{4}	Natalya Dudinskaya, Russian ballerina.	JPL · 8470
8471 Obrant	1983 RX_{4}	The ballet-master, producer and teacher-humanist Arkadij Efimovich Obrant (1906–1974) organized and headed a children's dancing ensemble during the siege of Leningrad in 1942–1945. The first Obrant contest of choreographic art took place in St. Petersburg in March 2002.	JPL · 8471
8472 Tarroni	1983 TC	Gino Tarroni (1958–1986), an Italian amateur astronomer	JPL · 8472
8474 Rettig	1985 GA_{1}	Terrence W. Rettig (born 1946), a planetary astronomer and educator at the University of Notre Dame.	JPL · 8474
8475 Vsevoivanov	1985 PC_{2}	Vsevolod Vladimirovich Ivanov (born 1934) is a professor at St. Petersburg University.	JPL · 8475
8477 Andrejkiselev	1986 RF_{7}	Andrey Kiselyov (1852–1940), a Russian teacher of mathematics. For more than 50 years, pupils in Russian secondary schools learned from his textbooks. His algebra textbook was reprinted 42 times and his geometry textbook 24 times, most recently in 1980.	JPL · 8477
8479 Held	1987 HD_{2}	Alexander Held (born 1958) has worked on the use of Earth observation data to improve our understanding in landscape ecology and vegetation conditions. He led Australia's international work in Earth Observation, where he provided the necessary rationale towards the establishment of the new Australian Space Agency in 2018.	JPL · 8479
8482 Wayneolm	1988 RA_{11}	Wayne Olm (born 1943), a science educator for the Green Bay, Wisconsin, public schools and the Wisconsin Space Grant College.	JPL · 8482
8483 Kinwalaniihsia	1988 SY_{1}	Daryl Baldwin (born 1962), whose traditional name Kinwalaniihsia means hawk in the Myaamia language, is director of the Myaamia Project at Miami University in Ohio.	JPL · 8483
8485 Satoru	1989 FL	Satoru Honda (1913–?), widow of Japanese astronomer Minoru Honda. She was a kindergarten principal, is the widow of Minoru Honda, famed comet and nova hunter. When light pollution affected her husband's observatory at Kurashiki she spent her retirement allowance to purchase a new mountain site. The name was suggested by K. Kenmotsu and T. Sato.	JPL · 8485
8486 Asherschel	1989 QV	Alexander Stewart Herschel (1836–1907) was a British astronomer and professor of natural philosophy at the Universities of Glasgow and Durham, whose studies of meteoric radiant points, the point in the sky from which the paths of meteors appear to originate, was instrumental for identifying comets as the source of meteor showers. The Herschel graph was named after him.	IAU · 8486
8487 Takedashin	1989 SQ	Shin Takeda, Japanese amateur astronomer living in Habikino City, Osaka.	IAU · 8487
8488 d'Argens	1989 SR_{1}	Jean-Baptiste de Boyer (1703–1771) was a French writer and freethinker who spent 25 years at the court of Frederick II. There he wrote his 18-volume Correspondence philosophique, which helped spread the ideas of the Enlightenment.	JPL · 8488
8489 Boulder	1989 TA_{3}	The U.S. city of Boulder, Colorado, about 48 km northwest of Denver. Settled in 1859 by miners and named for the large stones in the area, the University of Colorado was founded there in 1876, making Boulder a center for scientific and environmental research. The water supply for the city is unique, coming from the Arapahoe glacier high in the Rocky Mountains. The discoverer and his wife spent a year there at the JILA institution during 1967–1968.	JPL · 8489
8490 Akiehashimoto	1989 TU_{10}	Akie Hashimoto, Japanese amateur astronomer who lives in Chichibu City, Saitama.	IAU · 8490
8491 Joelle-gilles	1989 YL_{5}	Joelle (born 1978) and Gilles (born 1980) are the children of Martina Devos and Alain Meerbergen, close friends of the discoverer and his family.	JPL · 8491
8492 Kikuoka	1990 BZ	Hidekazu Kikuoka (born 1941) has been a planetarium educator at the Osaka Municipal Electric Science Museum and at the Science Museum of Osaka. He founded the Japan Astronomical Club in 1955 and served as its president during 1965–1985. The name was suggested by T. Sato and K. Kitao.	JPL · 8492
8493 Yachibozu	1990 BY_{1}	Yachibozu (tussocks), often seen in the Kushiro Marsh on the island of Hokkaido	JPL · 8493
8494 Edpatvega	1990 OT_{4}	Ed (born 1931) and Pat (born 1944) Vega have been a dynamic astronomical team for many years. Drawing on his experience as a pathologist, Ed Vega has completed a study, called "Comet Disaster", of the long-term effects to humanity of a large comet's impact on the earth. JPL	MPC · 8494
8496 Jandlsmith	1990 QO_{3}	Jim and Laurie Smith in recognition of their generosity and wisdom in the support of forefront tools to explore the heavens to the benefit of all of humanity. Most especially, their support was crucial for Harvard University's participation in the Magellan Project.	JPL · 8496
8498 Ufa	1990 RM_{17}	Ufa, a large industrial and cultural center in the south Urals.	JPL · 8498
8500 Hori	1990 TU	Gen-Ichiro Hori (born 1930), professor emeritus at Tokyo University.	JPL · 8500

== 8501–8600 ==
back to top

Named minor planet	Provisional	This minor planet was named for...	Ref · Catalog
8501 Wachholz	1990 TK_{8}	Burkhard Wachholz (1940–2000), a friend of the first discoverer, Lutz D. Schmadel, was longstanding senior chief mechanic and department head at the Institute of Physics, University of Heidelberg. His wealth of ideas and excellent craftmanship, as well as his readiness to help, were indispensable for countless projects.	JPL · 8501
8502 Bauhaus	1990 TR_{12}	Bauhaus, German architectural school of design founded in 1919 by the architect W. Gropius (1883–1969) in Weimar. The school's philosophy emphasized the unity of fine art and trade as the basis for artistic work. By incorporating engineering, the way was opened for industrial design. The Bauhaus moved to Dessau in 1925 and was closed by the Nazis for its "decadence" in 1932. Many Bauhaus masters emigrated to the United States. In 1937, the New Bauhaus was founded by L. Moholy-Nagy (1895–1946) in Chicago. Name proposed by the first discoverer.	JPL · 8502
8503 Masakatsu	1990 WX_{3}	Masakatsu Fujimoto (born 1948) played a leading role in constructing a laser interferometric gravitational wave detector, TAMA-300, which is the only interferometric-type detector in operation for gravitational waves emitted by a neutron-star binary or by supernovae in nearby galaxies	JPL · 8503
8515 Corvan	1991 RJ	Patrick G. Corvan (born 1940) has links with Armagh Observatory dating back to his schooldays. He is an avid observer whose enthusiasm for astronomy is readily communicated to others. His book and slide collections, as well as stories about the astronomers who have worked at or visited Armagh, are much in demand.	JPL · 8515
8516 Hyakkai	1991 TW_{1}	Masaaki Hyakkai (born 1963) is a science teacher and president of Gunma Astronomical Society. As a volunteer lecturer at astronomical observation meetings, he works to popularize science and astronomy	JPL · 8516
8521 Boulainvilliers	1992 GF_{4}	Henri de Boulainvilliers (1658–1722), French historian and political writer who influenced intellectual developments in the French Enlightenment. Claiming that historical studies can supply the tools for analyzing the present state of society, he worked out a theory of comparative historical study which approached the later writings of Montesquieu. In 1683 he published his l'Idée d'un Système Général de la Nature, which anticipated Holbach's Système de la Nature (1770). His Histoire de la religion et de la philosophie ancienne was published around 1700.	JPL · 8521
8523 Bouillabaisse	1992 PX	Bouillabaisse, a famous French fish soup, the glory of Provençal cooking. It contains fish, shellfish, olive oil, onions, tomatoes, garlic, parsley, saffron, fennel, thyme, bay leaf and orange peel (according to the Marseille recipe). All ingredients must be boiled together quickly.	JPL · 8523
8524 Paoloruffini	1992 RJ_{3}	Paolo Ruffini (1765–1822) an Italian mathematician and physician. In 1799 he published a book on the theory of equations, with the claim that the solution by radicals of a general equation of degree greater of four is impossible. Initially the mathematical community showed no interest in his work. However, in 1821 his work was acknowledged by Cauchy, who was influenced by his investigations and had generalized some of Ruffini's results. Owing to political problems he had to leave his chair in mathematics at Modena and begin a career in medicine, tending to patients from the poorest to the richest.	JPL · 8524
8525 Nielsabel	1992 RZ_{5}	Niels Henrik Abel (1802–1829), a Norwegian mathematician. In 1824 he proved the impossibility of solving a general equation of the fifth degree by radicals. Through his friendship with the editor Crelle, who encouraged him in his work, he wrote his masterpiece Recherches sur les fonctions elliptiques (1827), from which he could prove that Jacobi's work on elliptic integrals were consequences of his own work. It is interesting to note that neither Gauss nor Cauchy showed interest in Abel's work.	JPL · 8525
8526 Takeuchiyukou	1992 SM_{12}	Yukou Takeuchi (born 1932), Japanese amateur astronomer, designed a quartet camera system with a rotating shutter to measure the velocity of meteors, a system that he later improved to be automatic. In 1990 he began video observation with an image intensifier	JPL · 8526
8527 Katayama	1992 SV_{12}	Using unparalleled techniques in electron microscopy, Japanese biophysicist Eisaku Katayama (born 1949) revealed molecular shapes of various proteins in their functional states with a resolution that can only be superseded by x-ray study. He also contributed to new techniques in astronomical photography	JPL · 8527
8529 Sinzi	1992 UH_{2}	Akira M. Sinzi (born 1922) directed the astronomical division of the Hydrographic Department of Japan and was president of IAU Commission 4 during 1979–1982. Although his death has not been confirmed, he disappeared while mountain-climbing alone in the Kanto area in 1995. The name was suggested by A. Sengoku	JPL · 8529
8530 Korbokkur	1992 UK_{5}	According to the legend of the Ainu people of northern Japan, the members of the Korbokkur tribe were only 3 to 6 cm tall and moved so swiftly they were difficult to see. Satoru Sato began publishing Korbokkur tales in 1959. They are very popular in Japan, and not only for children	JPL · 8530
8531 Mineosaito	1992 WX_{2}	Mineo Saito (1952–2000) was the founder and an active leader of the Ohkuma Astronomical Club in Kakuda City, Miyagi prefecture. He was devoted to the popularization of astronomical activities	JPL · 8531
8533 Oohira	1993 BM	The Oohira station of Nihondaira Observatory, where this object was discovered, was very active in making observations of comets and minor planets from 1987 to 2000	JPL · 8533
8534 Knutsson	1993 FJ_{10}	Gösta Knutsson (1908–1973), Swedish author and radio producer who introduced quiz programs to Sweden. His children's stories about the cat Pelle Svanslös and his adventures in Uppsala have been very popular. The author of twelve books, the first in 1939, Knutsson lived not far from the locations where many of the adventures take place.	JPL · 8534
8535 Pellesvanslös	1993 FH_{22}	Pelle Svanslös (English: Peter No-Tail), a fictional cat that appears in Gösta Knutsson's children's stories. Some of the adventures of this cat, whose tail was bitten off by a rat when he was only a few days old, take place in the section of Uppsala where the astronomical observatory is located.	JPL · 8535
8536 Måns	1993 FK_{23}	Måns, fictional cat in the stories of Gösta Knutsson. In the stories, Måns, the eternal "bad guy" is always devising new ways of ridiculing Pelle Svanslös over his nonexistent tail.	JPL · 8536
8537 Billochbull	1993 FG_{24}	Bill and Bull, fictional cats in the stories of Gösta Knutsson. They are dim and fawning cronies of the bad cat Måns.	JPL · 8537
8538 Gammelmaja	1993 FR_{26}	Gammel-Maja, fictional cat in the stories of Gösta Knutsson. The old and wise cat seldom fails to notice when Pelle is being treated unfairly and often takes his side in arguments. She lives in the belfry of the Uppsala cathedral.	JPL · 8538
8539 Laban	1993 FT_{32}	Laban, fictional cat in the stories of Gösta Knutsson. He lived in the Observatory park in Uppsala and gave his name to one of the first modern computers at the Astronomical Observatory.	JPL · 8539
8540 Ardeberg	1993 FK_{80}	Arne Ardeberg (born 1940), Swedish professor emeritus of astronomy at Lund Observatory, was director of the European Southern Observatory at La Silla between 1979 and 1984. He played a very important role in the development of future extremely large telescopes with primary mirrors of aperture 30–50 meters.	JPL · 8540
8541 Schalkenmehren	1993 TZ_{32}	Schalkenmehren is a small German village not far from the city of Daun in the Ardennes (Eifel). A small road leads to the Hoher List Observatory.	JPL · 8541
8543 Tsunemi	1993 XO_{1}	Hiroshi Tsunemi (born 1951), Osaka University, has worked in x-ray astronomy as a chief scientist of the x-ray observing satellite ASCA. His scientific interest is focused on the structure and chemical composition of supernova remnants and related high-energy phenomena, as well as on the design of new x-ray detectors	JPL · 8543
8544 Sigenori	1993 YE	Sigenori Miyamoto (born 1931) is one of the pioneers of x-ray astronomy in Japan. In 1958, he invented a spark chamber that has been widely used for measuring the path of charged particles. Later, he started studies on x-ray objects and discovered the short time flux variation of x-ray sources	JPL · 8544
8545 McGee	1994 AM_{1}	Hazel McGee, a British amateur astronomer was meetings secretary of the British Astronomical Association from 1988 to 1993 and has been editor of the association's Journal since 1994, carrying out this task most efficiently and introducing many improvements. She is an enthusiastic observer of variable stars and of stellar occultations by minor planets.	JPL · 8545
8546 Kenmotsu	1994 AH_{3}	Kunio Kenmotsu (born 1932) has been director of the Kurashiki Observatory since 1990. For many years he was an astronomer in the Hydrographic Department of the Maritime Safety Agency of Japan. He also served successively as director of its hydrographic stations in Shimosato, Kurashiki and Bisei from 1976 to 1989	JPL · 8546
8548 Sumizihara	1994 ER_{3}	Sumizi Hara (1878–1968) provided the means for establishing the Kurashiki Observatory in 1926 and for operating it thereafter. The observatory is open to the general public and was the first of its kind in Japan. Hara was awarded many prizes, including "Honorary Citizen of Kurashiki City"	JPL · 8548
8549 Alcide	1994 FS	Alcide Bittesini (1913–1981), father of Luciano Bittesini, one of the Farra d´Isonzo amateur astronomers who discovered this minor planet. A natural sciences high-school teacher in Italy, Alcide Bittesini kindled his then-nine-year-old son's interest in astronomy by showing him a comet, using a handmade telescope constructed from a tin can, a pair of glasses and an eyepiece from his microscope	JPL · 8549
8550 Hesiodos	1994 PV_{24}	Hesiod (c. 700 BC), an early Greek poet, told the story of Pandora, who out of curiosity opened a jar, letting loose all evils on humanity. In the epic poem Works and Days Hesiod affirms his belief in justice and his feeling for the rhythm of life and nature.	JPL · 8550
8551 Daitarabochi	1994 VC_{7}	According to myth, the giant Daitarabochi built Mt. Fuji using nearby soil. The area from which he dug became Lake Biwa, the largest lake in Japan. The myth also claims that the many lakes in Japan were the footsteps of Daitarabochi	JPL · 8551
8552 Hyoichi	1995 HE	Hyoichi Kohno (born 1958), Japanese adventurer, born in Ehime prefecture, where this minor planet was discovered. Since 1980, he has boated down the Yukon River; climbed Mt. McKinley (6194 m) and Cerro Aconcagua (6959 m), the highest mountains in North and South America; walked across Patagonia; walked from Los Angeles to New York; walked from Algeria to Togo across the Sahara desert; and so on. In 1997, he became the first Japanese to walk to the North Pole alone	JPL · 8552
8553 Bradsmith	1995 HG	Bradford A. Smith (1931–2018) was an American astronomer who served as the principal investigator of the Imaging Experiment Team of the Voyager missions to the outer planets and has also contributed to many other NASA missions. He has also served as president of IAU Commission 16.	JPL · 8553
8554 Gabreta	1995 KH	Ancient name (first mentioned by Strabo in his Geographica) for the Šumava mountains in the Czech Republic	JPL · 8554
8555 Mirimao	1995 LD	Guido Mirimao (1909–1990), internationally known painter and draftsman. A graphic artist who contributed regularly to newspapers and magazines, from 1931 to 1940 he received a great number of prizes in national exhibitions. He also created art works and murals on sacred subjects in Italy and abroad	JPL · 8555
8556 Jana	1995 NB	Jana Moravcová, wife of Czech astronomer Zdeněk Moravec, who discovered this minor planet	MPC · 8556
8557 Šaroun	1995 OK	the discoverer's father, Jaroslav Šaroun (born 1943). A teacher at the Prague Academy of Musical Arts and a member of the Czech Philharmonic Orchestra, he is a pianist who is always in great demand as an accompanist for Czech and foreign singers. As a lover of astronomy, he influenced and supported his daughter in her desire to become an astronomer. This minor planet was discovered on the day after his birthday	JPL · 8557
8558 Hack	1995 PC	Margherita Hack (1922–2013), Italian astrophysicist, director of the Trieste Astronomical Observatory (1964–1987), director of the astronomy department of Trieste University (1985–1991 and 1996–1997) and a former president of IAU Commission 29. Although her studies ranged from optics and solar physics to radio astronomy (galactic 21-cm emission), her main fields of research were stellar spectroscopy, stellar atmospheres and observable effects of stellar evolution. Her later interests were the ultraviolet and optical spectroscopy of close interacting binaries, atmospheric eclipsing binaries and symbiotic stars.	JPL · 8558
8560 Tsubaki	1995 SD_{5}	Takio Tsubaki (1935–1999) was a solar physicist concerned particularly with the observational study of the solar corona and prominences. He served as a dean at Shiga University, on the board of the Astronomical Society of Japan and on the Solar Physics Committee at the National Astronomical Observatory	JPL · 8560
8561 Sikoruk	1995 SO_{29}	Leonid Leonidovich Sikoruk (born 1937) is a Russian astronomy popularizer, telescope builder, astrophotographer and film director in Russia. The name was suggested by forum users on www.astronomy.ru, many of whom became amateur astronomers owing to Leonid Sikoruk.	JPL · 8561
8564 Anomalocaris	1995 UL_{3}	Anomalocaris ("abnormal shrimp"), a prehistoric animal. The large carnivorous arthropod, was one of the many uniquely shaped multicellular creatures that appeared during the Cambrian explosion. The fossil was first discovered in the Burgess Shale in the Canadian Rocky Mountains. The name was suggested by I. Makino.	JPL · 8564
8568 Larrywilson	1996 RU_{2}	Lawrence (Larry) Wilson, whom discoverer E. F. Helin has known since his childhood. As the editor of the Pasadena Star News, he has been supportive of the discoverer's work at Caltech's Jet Propulsion Laboratory	JPL · 8568
8569 Mameli	1996 TG	The poet Goffredo Mameli (1827–1849) was the patriotic Italian author of the national anthem Fratelli d´Italia	JPL · 8569
8571 Taniguchi	1996 UX	Yoshiaki Taniguchi (born 1954) works mainly in extragalactic physics at Tohoku University. He promoted the first mid-infrared deep survey for dust-enshrouded young galaxies at high redshift using the Infrared Space Observatory and an optical deep survey for very-high-redshift galaxies using the Subaru Telescope	JPL · 8571
8572 Nijo	1996 UG_{1}	Nijō Castle, Kyoto, Japan	MPC · 8572
8573 Ivanka	1996 VQ	Ivanka Moravcová, mother of the discoverer Zdeněk Moravec	MPC · 8573
8574 Makotoirie	1996 VC_{2}	Makoto Irie (born 1939) is known for his outstanding coronal observations with the coronagraph at the Norikura Solar Observatory. He also made countless sunspot drawings at the National Astronomical Observatory of Japan during his service there from 1963 to 2001	JPL · 8574
8575 Seishitakeuchi	1996 VL_{8}	Seishi Takeuchi (born 1961) is an amateur astronomer and a painter. He has served as a volunteer artist for the planetarium of Hiroshima Children's Museum for 20 years and has contributed to more than 70 planetarium shows	JPL · 8575
8577 Choseikomori	1996 VX_{8}	Chosei Komori (born 1935) is a planetary geologist who works as a leader of the Planetary Geological Society of Japan. He is now studying the surface geology of the terrestrial planets and the evolution of the solar system. He is also known as a popularizer of planetary science	JPL · 8577
8578 Shojikato	1996 WZ	Shoji Kato (born 1935), Japanese astrophysicist and professor emeritus of Kyoto University, has been engaged in studying theories concerning oscillations and waves in accretion disks embedded in active galactic nuclei and proto-planetary disks. He served as a member of the Japanese National Committee of the IAU during 1985–1994.	JPL · 8578
8579 Hieizan	1996 XV_{19}	Hieizan, a Japanese mountain located to the northeast of Kyoto and to the west of Lake Biwa. Enryaku-ji Temple was constructed on the summit of Hieizan in the eighth century. It has played an important role, not only in Buddhism, but also in the history and culture of Japan.	JPL · 8579
8580 Pinsky	1996 XZ_{25}	Robert Pinsky (born 1940), poet laureate of the United States since 1997. Besides several books of poetry, Pinsky has produced a much-acclaimed new English translation of Dante's Inferno. Written in slant rhyme, Pinsky's version captures the rhythm and grandeur of the great Italian poet's masterpiece	JPL · 8580
8581 Johnen	1996 YO_{2}	Johnen, is a mountain in Nagano prefecture and part of the northern Japanese Alps. Popular with climbers, the 2857-m peak is especially famous because an Englishman, Walter Weston (1861–1940), climbed it in 1894 and spread the word of its beauty all over the world	JPL · 8581
8582 Kazuhisa	1997 AY	Kazuhisa Mishima (born 1970), a Japanese astronomy curator at the Kurashiki Science Center, is an eager planetarium educator who spreads astronomy in an enjoyable way. He makes available predictions for viewing artificial satellites.	JPL · 8582
8583 Froberger	1997 AK_{6}	Johann Jakob Froberger (1616–1667), German organist and composer of his day. A pupil of Frescobaldi, he combined features of many national styles. His toccate, full of imaginative chromatic harmonies, were copied out and imitated by J. S. Bach.	JPL · 8583
8585 Purpurea	2025 P-L	The purple heron (Ardea purpurea) a wading bird	JPL · 8585
8586 Epops	2563 P-L	The hoopoe (Upupa epops), a colorful bird found across Afro-Eurasia, notable for its distinctive "crown" of feathers.	JPL · 8586
8587 Ruficollis	3078 P-L	The little grebe (Tachybaptus ruficollis), also known as dabchick, a water bird	JPL · 8587
8588 Avosetta	4025 P-L	The pied avocet (Recurvirostra avosetta), a large black and white wading bird	JPL · 8588
8589 Stellaris	4068 P-L	The Eurasian bittern (Botaurus stellaris), a wading bird	JPL · 8589
8590 Pygargus	6533 P-L	The Montagu's harrier (Circus pygargus), a bird of prey of the harrier family	JPL · 8590
8591 Excubitor	6543 P-L	The great grey shrike (Lanius excubitor), also known as the northern shrike, is a large songbird	JPL · 8591
8592 Rubetra	1188 T-1	The whinchat (Saxicola rubetra), a small migratory passerine bird	JPL · 8592
8593 Angustirostris	2186 T-1	The marbled duck (Marmaronetta angustirostris), a medium-sized duck	JPL · 8593
8594 Albifrons	2245 T-1	The little tern (Sterna albifrons), a seabird	JPL · 8594
8595 Dougallii	3233 T-1	The roseate tern (Sterna dougallii), a seabird	JPL · 8595
8596 Alchata	1298 T-2	The pin-tailed sandgrouse (Pterocles alchata), a medium large bird in the sandgrouse family.	JPL · 8596
8597 Sandvicensis	2045 T-2	The Sandwich tern (Sterna sandvicensis), a seabird	JPL · 8597
8598 Tetrix	2202 T-2	The black grouse (Tetrao tetrix), a large game bird in the grouse family	JPL · 8598
8599 Riparia	2277 T-2	The sand martin (Riparia riparia), a migratory passerine bird in the swallow family	JPL · 8599
8600 Arundinaceus	3060 T-2	The great reed warbler (Acrocephalus arundinaceus), a small Eurasian passerine	JPL · 8600

== 8601–8700 ==
back to top

Named minor planet	Provisional	This minor planet was named for...	Ref · Catalog
8601 Ciconia	3155 T-2	The white stork (Ciconia ciconia)	JPL · 8601
8602 Oedicnemus	2480 T-3	The stone curlew (Burhinus oedicnemus), a bird also known as dikkops or thick-knees	JPL · 8602
8603 Senator	3134 T-3	The woodchat shrike (Lanius senator), a small bird and member of the shrike family Laniidae	JPL · 8603
8604 Vanier	1929 PK	Jean Vanier (1928–2019) was a Canadian Catholic philosopher, theologian, and humanitarian. As the founder of two global communities (L'Arche, Faith and Light) for people with intellectual disabilities, he presents a compelling vision of a fully human life, lived in compassionate community.	JPL · 8604
8608 Chelomey	1976 YO_{2}	Vladimir Chelomey (1914–1984), a Russian designer of space technology, created space systems for Salyut crewed stations and various other applications.	JPL · 8608
8609 Shuvalov	1977 QH_{3}	Ivan Shuvalov (1727–1797), was a prominent Russian government figure who contributed to the development of Russian science and art and was a patron of scientists, writers and painters. He was a founder and first curator of Moscow University.	JPL · 8609
8610 Goldhaber	1977 UD	Maurice Goldhaber (1911–2011), and his brother, Gerson Goldhaber (1924–2010), two Austrian/German-born American physicist, contributed to 20th-century physics with discoveries that include charmed mesons and photodisintegration of the deuteron. They were still active members of the SuperKamiokande Collaboration and Supernova Cosmology Project at the time of naming. Name suggested by C. Pennypacker.	JPL · 8610
8611 Judithgoldhaber	1977 UM_{4}	Judith Goldhaber (born 1934), science writer for four decades at Lawrence Berkeley National Laboratory.	JPL · 8611
8612 Burov	1978 SS_{7}	Andrej Konstantinovich Burov (1900–1957), a Russian architect and inventor.	JPL · 8612
8613 Cindyschulz	1978 VE_{10}	Cindy Kaye Schulz (born 1969) is the "Technical Lead" of the Lucy mission.	IAU · 8613
8614 Svedhem	1978 VP_{11}	Håkan Svedhem (b. 1958), a Swedish engineer and planetary scientist.	IAU · 8614
8615 Philipgrahamgood	1979 MB_{2}	Philip Graham Good (born 1961) is the "Guidance, Navigation, and Control Lead" of the Lucy mission, who has also been involved in NASA'S MAVEN, MRO, Stardust and JUNO missions.	IAU · 8615
8616 Fogelquist	1980 FY_{4}	Rune Fogelquist (1924–2014), Swedish amateur astronomer, for his inspiring activities in astronomy popularization within the Mariestad Astronomy Club, located near Lake Vänern in southern Sweden, and the building and running of the nearby Bifrost Observatory, the main instrument at which is a 0.60-m reflector. The observatory has about 1000 visitors annually. The naming commemorates the twentieth anniversary of the Mariestad Astronomy Club, celebrated in August 1998. Name proposed and citation prepared by H. Rickman (Src).	JPL · 8616
8617 Fellous	1980 PW	Jean-Louis Fellous (born 1947) served as COSPAR Executive Director for over a decade. He was essential to COSPAR's mission to encourage and facilitate international cooperation in space research, particularly when the organization of COSPAR activities was difficult for either internal or external circumstances.	JPL · 8617
8618 Sethjacobson	1981 DX	Seth A. Jacobson (born 1986), a postdoctoral researcher at the Observatoire de Nice.	JPL · 8618
8620 Lowkevrudolph	1981 EK_{5}	Lowell Kevin Rudolph (born 1950) is the "Spacecraft Design Lead" of the Lucy mission as well as the "Lockheed Martin Proposal Coordinator", who has also been involved in NASA'S Cassini–Huygens, JUNO, and OSIRIS-REx missions.	IAU · 8620
8621 Jimparsons	1981 EK_{7}	Jim Parsons (born 1973), an American actor who portrays the fictional Caltech theoretical physicist Dr. Sheldon Lee Cooper in the television sitcom The Big Bang Theory.	JPL · 8621
8622 Mayimbialik	1981 EM_{8}	Mayim Bialik (born 1975), an American actress and real-life neuroscientist, portrays the fictional neurobiologist Amy Farrah Fowler in the television sitcom The Big Bang Theory.	JPL · 8622
8623 Johnnygalecki	1981 EQ_{9}	Johnny Galecki (born 1975), an American actor who portrays the fictional Caltech physicist Dr. Leonard Hofstadter in the television sitcom The Big Bang Theory.	JPL · 8623
8624 Kaleycuoco	1981 ES_{9}	Kaley Cuoco (born 1985), an American actress who portrays Penny in the television sitcom The Big Bang Theory.	JPL · 8624
8625 Simonhelberg	1981 EX_{15}	Simon Helberg (born 1980), an American actor and comedian who portrays the fictional Caltech aerospace engineer Howard Wolowitz in the television sitcom The Big Bang Theory.	JPL · 8625
8626 Melissarauch	1981 EC_{18}	Melissa Rauch (born 1980), an American actress and comedian who portrays microbiologist Bernadette Rostenkowski in the television sitcom The Big Bang Theory.	JPL · 8626
8627 Kunalnayyar	1981 EU_{20}	Kunal Nayyar (born 1981), a British-born Indian actor who portrays the fictional Caltech astrophysicist Dr. Rajesh Koothrappali in the television sitcom The Big Bang Theory.	JPL · 8627
8628 Davidsaltzberg	1981 EX_{21}	David Saltzberg (born 1967) is a professor of physics and astronomy at the University of California, Los Angeles, and science consultant for the television sitcom The Big Bang Theory.	JPL · 8628
8629 Chucklorre	1981 EU_{26}	Chuck Lorre (born Charles Michael Levine, 1952) is an American television writer, director, and producer. He is co-creator and executive producer of the situation comedy The Big Bang Theory.	JPL · 8629
8630 Billprady	1981 EY_{35}	Bill Prady (born 1960) is an American television writer and producer. He is co-creator and executive producer of the situation comedy The Big Bang Theory.	JPL · 8630
8631 Sherikboonstra	1981 EK_{41}	Sheri Klug Boonstra (born 1955) is the lead of L'SPACE, the "Lucy Student Collaboration" for the Lucy mission. She also oversees NASA's "Mars Education Program" and the "Undergraduate Student Research Program".	IAU · 8631
8632 Egleston	1981 FR	Margaret Ericksen Egleston (born 1943), a scientific programmer at the Harvard-Smithsonian Center for Astrophysics since 1984.	JPL · 8632
8633 Keisukenagao	1981 FC_{1}	Keisuke Nagao (born 1949), a professor at the Geochemical Research Center of the University of Tokyo.	JPL · 8633
8634 Neubauer	1981 GG	Fritz Neubauer (born 1940) is a pioneer in space science. His main fields are planetary magnetic fields and magnetospheres, interplanetary plasma and the interaction of the solar wind with comets. He has been principal and co-investigator on many NASA and ESA space missions. The name was suggested by M. Pätzold.	JPL · 8634
8635 Yuriosipov	1985 PG_{2}	Yurij Aleksandrovich Osipov (born 1965), a physician at the Bakhchisaraj regional hospital in the Crimea.	JPL · 8635
8636 Malvina	1985 UH_{2}	Malvina Maury (born 1985), daughter of astronomer Alain Maury who participated in the discovery of this minor planet. Malvina was born on the day of discovery, in Poway, near San Diego, while her father was working at Palomar Observatory.	JPL · 8636
8639 Vonšovský	1986 VB_{1}	Břetislav Vonšovský (1937–2019) was the chairman of South Bohemian branch of the Czech Astronomical Society. He led Tábor Observatory as an enthusiastic populizer of astronomy for 41 years. He dealt with lectures for schools and general public and was interested in stellar occultations.	IAU · 8639
8640 Ritaschulz	1986 VX_{5}	Rita Schulz (born 1961), a German planetary scientist at the European Space Agency, is an expert on the physical and chemical properties of comets. She studied the structure of the CN coma of comet 1P/Halley and is currently deputy project scientist on the Rosetta mission. The name was suggested by M. A. Barucci.	JPL · 8640
8642 Shawnkerry	1988 RZ_{11}	Shawn Kerry Moore Bus (born 1956), the wife of the discoverer.	JPL · 8642
8643 Quercus	1988 SC	Quercus, or oak trees, is a genus belonging to the family Fagaceae. The English oak (Quercus robur) reaches a height of 30–40 meters and an age of more than a thousand years.	JPL · 8643
8644 Betulapendula	1988 SD	The silver birch (Betula pendula), a plant species in the genus Betula belonging to the family Betulaceae. It is a beautiful tree with an almost white bark. It grows fast and reaches a height of about 25 meters and an age of 60–80 years.	JPL · 8644
8647 Populus	1989 RG	Populus, a genus of plants including aspen and cottonwood, belongs to the family Salicaceae. Populus nigra (black poplar) is a fast-growing tree with a height of about 30 meters, whereas Populus tremula (trembling aspen) is easily recognizable by its shimmering appearance.	JPL · 8647
8648 Salix	1989 RJ	Salix, known as willows, is a genus belonging to the family Salicaceae. Salix alba (white willow) is a small tree with long, thin leaves. This fast-growing tree is used for windbreaks and screens. Salix caprea (goat or pussy willow) is a fast-growing small tree with striking catkins in early spring.	JPL · 8648
8649 Juglans	1989 SS_{2}	Juglans or walnut trees, is a genus belonging to the family Juglandaceae Juglans regia (English walnut) produces a particularly delicious fruit.	JPL · 8649
8651 Alineraynal	1989 YU_{5}	Aline Marie Raynal (born 1937), professor of botany at the Muséum National d´Histoire Naturelle de Paris	JPL · 8651
8652 Acacia	1990 EA_{5}	Acacia, a genus of shrubs, known as the wattles or acacias, belonging to the family Mimosaceae. Acacia mearnsii (mimosa) is a shrub with feathery leaves composed of many small leaflets. The strongly scented tiny yellow flowers are grouped in loose, rounded clusters.	JPL · 8652
8656 Cupressus	1990 QY_{8}	Cupressus (cypress), belonging to the family Cupressaceae. Cupressus macrocarpa (Monterrey cypress) produces a durable wood. Cupressocyparis leylandii (Leyland cypress), hybridized from the macrocarpia, has scale-like dark green leaves that are arranged at various angles to the shoot. These trees are typical of the landscape in Tuscany.	JPL · 8656
8657 Cedrus	1990 QE_{9}	Cedrus (cedar), belonging to the family Pinaceae. Cedrus libani (cedar of Lebanon) has a fruit that is an ovoid upright cone.	JPL · 8657
8660 Sano	1990 TM_{1}	Yasuo Sano (born 1959), a staff member of the Nayoro Municipal Kihara Observatory	JPL · 8660
8661 Ratzinger	1990 TA_{13}	Pope Benedict XVI (born 1927), then Joseph Cardinal Ratzinger, a German professor of theology	JPL · 8661
8663 Davidjohnston	1991 DJ_{1}	David Alexander Johnston (1949–1980), an American volcanologist.	JPL · 8663
8664 Grigorijrichters	1991 GR_{1}	Grigorij Richters (born 1987), a film director and producer, who has worked to increase awareness of the dangers of asteroid impacts on the Earth. In 2014 he founded Asteroid Day, a worldwide organisation centered on identifying all dangerous NEOs and developing ways to avoid an impending catastrophe.	JPL · 8664
8665 Daun-Eifel	1991 GA_{9}	Daun, a German city in the Eifel region, not far from the Belgian border. Well known for its volcanic lakes and healthy mineral water Dauner Sprudel, it has recently celebrated its 1000th anniversary.	JPL · 8665
8666 Reuter	1991 GG_{10}	Fritz Reuter (1810–1874), a German poet and social critic.	JPL · 8666
8667 Fontane	1991 GH_{10}	Theodor Fontane (1819–1898) on the occasion of the 100th anniversary of his death. He brought the German novel to worldwide importance.	JPL · 8667
8668 Satomimura	1991 HM	Satomimura (Satomi village), Ibaraki prefecture, Japan, 150 km north of Tokyo, famous for its starry sky and annual autumn star party	JPL · 8668
8672 Morse	1991 PW_{16}	Samuel F. B. Morse (1791–1872), an American painter and inventor who in 1838 developed the code of dots and dashes that now bears his name.	JPL · 8672
8676 Lully	1992 CT_{2}	Jean-Baptiste Lully (1632–1687), an Italian-French composer, created a very lively style of composition by introducing quicker dances such as the bourrée, gavotte and gigue into his ballets. A beautiful example of his music is La Marche des Combattans.	JPL · 8676
8677 Charlier	1992 ES_{5}	Carl Charlier (1862–1934), Swedish professor of astronomy at Uppsala during 1890–1897 and later at Lund, worked in several fields of astronomy, including celestial mechanics and photometry. He was one of the leading founders of stellar statistics, applying mathematical statistics to astronomical problems.	JPL · 8677
8678 Bäl	1992 ER_{6}	Bäl, is a small and typical country parish on the Swedish island of Gotland, often associated on Gotland with the well-known song "Farewell to Bäl".	JPL · 8678
8679 Tingstäde	1992 EG_{8}	Tingstäde, is a parish on Gotland. In Tingstäde Träsk, a swamp that is the second largest lake on the island, the remains of a timber construction involving some 10~000 logs, probably from the sixth century, is still visible on the lake floor.	JPL · 8679
8680 Rone	1992 EJ_{9}	Rone, a small parish on Gotland, Sweden, is well known for the lyrics to the song Rune from Rone. Nearby Uggarde Rojr, a 3000-year-old burial mound from the Bronze Age with a diameter of 50 meters and a height of 7 meters, is one of the biggest in Sweden.	JPL · 8680
8681 Burs	1992 EN_{9}	Burs is a small parish on the Swedish island of Gotland. Gustav Edman (1881–1912), well known for his height (2.46 meters) and strength, was born in Burs. Burs also has the remains of the largest house (67 × 11 meters) in Sweden from the Roman Iron Age.	JPL · 8681
8682 Kräklingbo	1992 ER_{9}	Kräklingbo, is a small parish on the Swedish island of Gotland. Located here on a hill are the remains of a fortification nearly 2000 years old, the biggest in Scandinavia. From that hill many of the medieval churches on the island can be seen.	JPL · 8682
8683 Sjölander	1992 EE_{13}	Nils Göran Sjölander (born 1951), a Swedish astronomer and formerly librarian at Uppsala Observatory, studies dwarf galaxies and has a keen interest in the history of astronomy.	MPC · 8683
8684 Reichwein	1992 FO_{3}	Adolf Reichwein (1898–1944), resistance fighter in Nazi Germany	MPC · 8684
8685 Fauré	1992 GG_{3}	Gabriel Fauré (1845–1924) was a French composer who revolutionized French music by using daring harmonic progressions and modulations. A set of highly original nocturnes, barcaroles and impromptus was composed after the example of Chopin. His Ballade (1881) for piano is very popular.	JPL · 8685
8686 Akenside	1992 OX_{1}	Mark Akenside (1721–1770), a British poet and physician who studied medicine at the University of Leiden. There he met the French philosopher d'Holbach, who translated his well-known philosophical essay The Pleasures of Imagination (1744) into French (1759).	JPL · 8686
8687 Caussols	1992 PV	The observatory at Caussols, in the French Alps-Maritimes, is situated above the northern part of a 1100-m high, open and flat plain, the Plateau de Caussols, about 10 km from the Route Napoléon.	JPL · 8687
8688 Delaunay	1992 PV_{1}	Charles-Eugène Delaunay (1816–1872), a French mathematician and astronomer.	JPL · 8688
8690 Swindle	1992 SW_{3}	Timothy D. Swindle (born 1955), of the Lunar and Planetary Laboratory, is a meteoriticist who has specialized in the study of noble gases in meteorites. Swindle has used meteorites, including the martian meteorites, to study the atmospheres of other planets and water products in the Solar System.	JPL · 8690
8691 Etsuko	1992 UZ_{1}	Etsuko Kobayashi (born 1926), the first female lecturer at the Gotoh Planetarium and Astronomical Museum in Tokyo.	JPL · 8691
8693 Matsuki	1992 WH_{1}	Noboru Matsuki (born 1934), a Japanese amateur astronomer who has accumulated a huge amount of observational data on sunspots since 1958.	JPL · 8693
8695 Bergvall	1993 FW_{8}	Nils Bergvall (born 1945), Swedish astronomer at Uppsala Observatory, studies galaxy evolution and is also interested in music.	JPL · 8695
8696 Kjeriksson	1993 FM_{16}	Kjell Eriksson (born 1948), a Swedish astronomer and director of Uppsala Observatory, where he studies stellar atmospheres.	JPL · 8696
8697 Olofsson	1993 FT_{23}	Kjell Olofsson (born 1955), a Swedish astronomer who studies galaxies. He is the director of undergraduate studies at the Uppsala Observatory and studies galaxies.	JPL · 8697
8698 Bertilpettersson	1993 FT_{41}	Bertil Pettersson (born 1945), a Swedish astronomer studies star formation, especially T Tauri stars and Herbig–Haro objects. He is also the system manager at the Uppsala Observatory.	JPL · 8698
8700 Gevaert	1993 JL_{1}	Lieven Gevaert (1868–1935) was a Flemish Belgian industrialist who established the L. Gevaert & Cie at Mortsel, near Antwerp, beginning in 1890 with a small shop of homemade photographical paper, which later became Agfa-Gevaert corporation. Gevaert glass plates have been used for many purposes in astronomy, especially for the astrometry of minor planets.	JPL · 8700

== 8701–8800 ==
back to top

Named minor planet	Provisional	This minor planet was named for...	Ref · Catalog
8702 Nakanishi	1993 VX_{3}	Akio Nakanishi (born 1964), Japanese astrophotographer and member of Mount Nyukasa station, where this minor planet was discovered. He is also a discoverer of minor planets.	JPL · 8702
8703 Nakanotadao	1993 XP_{1}	Tadao Nakano (born 1926), Osaka City University, proposed in 1953 the so-called Nakano-Nishijima-Gell-Man rule of the statistics of elementary particles, which became one of the foundations of the quark model. His interests also extend to general relativity and to gauge theory.	JPL · 8703
8704 Sadakane	1993 YJ	Kozo Sadakane (born 1947), Osaka Kyoiku University, is an expert on the analysis of stellar spectra.	JPL · 8704
8706 Takeyama	1994 CM	Haruo Takeyama (1915–), Japanese physicist and astronomy enthusiast	JPL · 8706
8707 Arakihiroshi	1994 CE_{2}	Hiroshi Araki (born 1935), Japanese amateur astronomer	JPL · 8707
8709 Kadlu	1994 JF_{1}	Kadlu, the Eskimo thunder-goddess was originally a little girl who played so noisily that her parents told her and her sisters to go outside to play.	JPL · 8709
8710 Hawley	1994 JK_{9}	Walter N. Hawley, physics and astronomy teacher at Saint Paul's School in Concord, New Hampshire and director of the school observatory there, and friend of the discoverer	MPC · 8710
8711 Lukeasher	1994 LL	Luke Asher Hergenrother (born 2010),a son of the discoverer.	JPL · 8711
8712 Suzuko	1994 TH_{2}	Suzuko Hurukawa (born 1935), wife of astronomer Kiichirou Hurukawa	JPL · 8712
8713 Azusa	1995 BT_{2}	Azusa Hurukawa (born 1968), the daughter of astronomer Kiichirou Hurukawa.	JPL · 8713
8716 Ginestra	1995 SB_{2}	Giacomo Leopardi (1798–1837), the great poet and philosopher from the Italian Romantic period. Full of astronomical references, his poetry expresses the great sense of bewilderment of post-Copernican man, faced with an infinite variety of worlds of which he is no longer the center, but only infinitesimal and marginal. Nevertheless, the Ginestra becomes the symbol of man/flower in the middle of the cosmos/desert, a cosmos sustained by rigid mechanistic laws, indifferent to every desire and human sentiment, existing only to perpetuate the cycle of production and universal destruction. Name suggested and citation prepared by M. Vicoli.	JPL · 8716
8717 Richviktorov	1995 SN_{29}	Richard Viktorov (1929–1983), a Soviet director best known for his fantasy film Moscow-Cassiopeia	JPL · 8717
8719 Vesmír	1995 VR	Vesmír, a Czech monthly journal of science founded in 1871. It describes new findings from the whole spectrum of science including astronomy, biology, chemistry, cybernetics, genetics, geology, medicine and physics, as well as their interdisciplinary connections.	JPL · 8719
8720 Takamizawa	1995 WE_{1}	Kesao Takamizawa (born 1952), one of the most renowned amateur astronomers in Japan.	JPL · 8720
8721 AMOS	1996 AO_{3}	Air Force Maui Optical and Supercomputing observatory (AMOS, originally the Air Force Maui Optical Station)	JPL · 8721
8722 Schirra	1996 QU_{1}	Wally Schirra, (born 1923), the only astronaut to command Mercury, Gemini and Apollo spacecraft.	JPL · 8722
8723 Azumayama	1996 SL_{7}	Azumayama, a volcanic mountain range that forms the border between the Fukushima and Yamagata prefecture in the northern part of mainland Japan.	JPL · 8723
8724 Junkoehara	1996 SK_{8}	Junko Ehara (born 1957), Japanese cellist and amateur astronomer	JPL · 8724
8725 Keiko	1996 TG_{5}	Keiko Morinaga (born 1969), a member of the Matsue Astronomy Club and the wife and observing partner of the discoverer.	JPL · 8725
8726 Masamotonasu	1996 VP_{5}	Masamoto Nasu (born 1942), Japanese author and president of the Japanese Association of Writers for Children	JPL · 8726
8728 Mimatsu	1996 VF_{9}	Masao Mimatsu (1888–1977), a Japanese postmaster and an amateur volcanologist.	JPL · 8728
8729 Descour	1996 VZ_{12}	Anne S. Descour (born 1968), an imaginative and energetic computer scientist at the University of Arizona's Lunar and Planetary Laboratory.	JPL · 8729
8730 Iidesan	1996 VT_{30}	Iidesan mountain range and national park, which forms the borders between Fukushima, Niigata and Yamagata prefectures in northern mainland Japan	JPL · 8730
8731 Tejima	1996 WY	Seiichi Tejima, 19th–20th-century Japanese education advocate, who contributed to the development of what is now the National Science Museum of Japan and founder of what is now Kyoritsu Women's University	JPL · 8731
8732 Champion	1996 XR_{25}	Frank L. Champion (1884–1917), an American aviator.	JPL · 8732
8733 Ohsugi	1996 YB_{1}	Takashi Ohsugi (born 1944), currently director of the Hiroshima Astrophysical Science Center, is an expert on the development of semiconductor detectors for high-energy astrophysics. He developed silicon sensors for the LAT instrument on the Fermi Gamma-ray Space Telescope	JPL · 8733
8734 Warner	1997 AA	Brian D. Warner, American astronomer, discoverer of minor planets and publisher of the Minor Planet Observer monthly newsletter.	JPL · 8734
8735 Yoshiosakai	1997 AA_{1}	Sakai Yoshio (1923–2002) is a Japanese pioneer in building astronomical observatories for the general public. He established the Hidahiko Tenmondai at his own expense. He also toiled as director of Ogawa Astronomical Observatory (founded in 1991), contributing much to education in astronomy.	JPL · 8735
8736 Shigehisa	1997 AD_{7}	Osao Shigehisa (born 1936) a Japanese astronomer, who has actively observed variable stars since 1952. An enthusiastic recorder of the activities of Japanese amateur astronomers, he played an important role in compiling a History of Amateur Astronomy in Japan in 1987, as well as a sequel in 1994.	JPL · 8736
8737 Takehiro	1997 AL_{13}	Takehiro Hayashi (born 1951) is a Japanese professor at Hiroshima University. His main research field is education in astronomy and earth science, and he has given children, students and adults alike many opportunities to observe celestial objects with telescopes.	JPL · 8737
8738 Saji	1997 AQ_{16}	Saji Observatory, located in Saji, Tottori, Japan. With its 1.03-m telescope, is situated on a hill overlooking Saji village. Saji's 3200 residents constructed their observatory in 1994, and the village assembly adopted a rule of keeping the skies dark.	JPL · 8738
8739 Morihisa	1997 BE_{3}	Morihisa Suzuki (born 1944), Japanese petrologist and meteoricist	JPL · 8739
8740 Václav	1998 AS_{8}	Wenceslaus I, Duke of Bohemia (c. 907–935), a medieval child ruler and Czech Roman Catholic saint. The naming also honors his descendants.	MPC · 8740
8741 Suzukisuzuko	1998 BR_{8}	Suzuko Suzuki, 20th-century Japanese poet and amateur astronomer	JPL · 8741
8742 Bonazzoli	1998 CB_{2}	Roberto Bonazzoli (1940–1996), a friend of the discoverer.	JPL · 8742
8743 Kèneke	1998 EH_{12}	Kèneke is Flemish for "small child", and it is only from her photographs that the discoverer knows and remembers his elder sister, Virginia Margaretha Anna Elst (1930–1935), who died from meningitis before he was born.	JPL · 8743
8744 Cilla	1998 FE_{59}	Priscilla Annette (1994–1998), niece of Lincoln Laboratory staff member Colleen Cilley.	JPL · 8744
8745 Delaney	1998 FO_{65}	William P. Delaney, director's fellow at M.I.T. Lincoln Laboratory. This is a donation of the fruit of an optical search program to an expert in radar.	JPL · 8745
8747 Asahi	1998 FS_{73}	Asahi, the mountain range forming the border between Niigata and Yamagata prefectures in the northern part of mainland Japan. Meaning "morning sun", the name is also that of several Japanese towns and villages, as well as of another mountain range.	JPL · 8747
8749 Beatles	1998 GJ_{10}	The Beatles, the great 1960s British popular rock group from Liverpool comprised John Lennon, Paul McCartney, George Harrison and Ringo Starr. They are unequalled in the rock era as prolific songwriters and innovative recording artists with George Martin.	JPL · 8749
8750 Nettarufina	2197 P-L	The red-crested pochard (Netta rufina), a bird	JPL · 8750
8751 Nigricollis	2594 P-L	The black-necked grebe (Podiceps nigricollis), a bird	JPL · 8751
8752 Flammeus	2604 P-L	The short-eared owl (Asio flammeus), a bird	JPL · 8752
8753 Nycticorax	2636 P-L	The black-crowned night heron (Nycticorax nycticorax), a bird	JPL · 8753
8754 Leucorodia	4521 P-L	The spoonbill (Platalea leucorodia), a bird	JPL · 8754
8755 Querquedula	4586 P-L	The garganey (Anas querquedula), a bird	JPL · 8755
8756 Mollissima	6588 P-L	The common eider (Somateria mollissima), a bird	JPL · 8756
8757 Cyaneus	6600 P-L	The hen harrier (Circus cyaneus), a bird	JPL · 8757
8758 Perdix	6683 P-L	The grey partridge (Perdix perdix), a bird	JPL · 8758
8759 Porzana	7603 P-L	The crakes (Porzana), a genus of birds	JPL · 8759
8760 Crex	1081 T-1	The corncrake (Crex crex), a bird	JPL · 8760
8761 Crane	1163 T-1	The cranes (Grus), a genus of birds	JPL · 8761
8762 Hiaticula	3196 T-1	The ringed plover (Charadrius hiaticula), a bird	JPL · 8762
8763 Pugnax	3271 T-1	The ruff (Philonachus pugnax), a bird	JPL · 8763
8764 Gallinago	1109 T-2	The snipes (Gallinago), a genus of birds	JPL · 8764
8765 Limosa	1274 T-2	The godwits (Limosa), a genus of birds	JPL · 8765
8766 Niger	1304 T-2	The Niger River, West Africa; several birds and plants also have niger ("black") as a species epithet, e.g. the black tern Chlidonias niger.	JPL · 8766
8767 Commontern	1335 T-2	The common tern, a bird.	JPL · 8767
8768 Barnowl	2080 T-2	The barn owl, a bird.	JPL · 8768
8769 Arctictern	2181 T-2	The Arctic tern, a bird.	JPL · 8769
8770 Totanus	3076 T-2	The common redshank Tringa totanus (a bird).	JPL · 8770
8771 Biarmicus	3187 T-2	The bearded tit Panurus biarmicus (a bird).	JPL · 8771
8772 Minutus	4254 T-2	Several birds have minutus ("small") as a species epithet, e.g. the little gull Larus minutus.	JPL · 8772
8773 Torquilla	5006 T-2	The wryneck Jynx torquilla (a bird).	JPL · 8773
8774 Viridis	5162 T-2	The green woodpecker Picus viridis (a bird).	JPL · 8774
8775 Cristata	5490 T-2	Several birds have cristatus ("crested") as a species epithet, e.g. the crested tit Parus cristatus.	JPL · 8775
8776 Campestris	2287 T-3	Several birds and plants have campestris ("of fields") as a species epithet, e.g. the tawny pipit Anthus campestris.	JPL · 8776
8777 Torquata	5016 T-3	Several birds have torquata ("collared") as a species epithet.	JPL · 8777
8780 Forte	1975 LT	Juan Carlos Forte (born 1949), Argentinian astronomer, has conducted most of his professional work at the La Plata Observatory. His main field of research is the galactic and extragalactic system of globular clusters, an area to which he has contributed over 120 refereed papers.	JPL · 8780
8781 Yurka	1976 GA_{2}	Yuri Sergeevich Efimov (born 1935), an astrophysicist.	JPL · 8781
8782 Bakhrakh	1976 UG_{2}	Lev Davidovich Bakhrakh (born 1921), a corresponding member of the Russian Academy of Sciences.	JPL · 8782
8783 Gopasyuk	1977 EK_{1}	Stepan Il'ich Gopasyuk (born 1930), a leading scientist at the Crimean Astrophysical Observatory.	JPL · 8783
8785 Boltwood	1978 RR_{1}	Paul Boltwood (born 1943), a Canadian computer scientist and amateur astronomer. He monitored the peculiar object OJ 287 for some two years. He also obtained deep-sky CCD images with limiting magnitude 24.5 using a home-built 0.4-m reflector.	JPL · 8785
8786 Belskaya	1978 RA_{8}	Irina N. Belskaya, Ukrainian astronomer at the Kharkov Astronomical Observatory (101) and a friend of the discoverer, Claes-Ingvar Lagerkvist. Her research focuses on the spin and surface properties of main-belt minor planets, in particular of M-type asteroids. She has made important contributions in this field by combining photometric and polarimetric observations with optical laboratory measurements of the analogous asteroidal materials	JPL · 8786
8787 Ignatenko	1978 TL_{4}	Vitalij Nikitich Ignatenko (born 1941), Russian journalist and film script-writer.	JPL · 8787
8788 Labeyrie	1978 VP_{2}	Catherine Labeyrie, a French astronomer and hypersentitisation expert of the 0.9-meter Schmidt telescope at CERGA Observatory, as well as Antoine Labeyrie, a French optician and astronomer.	MPC · 8788
8789 Effertz	1978 VZ_{7}	Mark Joseph Effertz (born 1977) is the "Mission Operations Spacecraft Engineer" of the Lucy mission.	IAU · 8789
8790 Michaelamato	1978 VN_{9}	Michael J. Amato (born 1967) was leading the "Early Mission Proposal" and the "Phase A" of the Lucy mission at Goddard Space Flight Center. He is also involved in NASA's OSIRIS-REx, MAVEN, Dragonfly, and DAVINCI+ missions.	IAU · 8790
8791 Donyabradshaw	1978 VG_{11}	Donya Douglas–Bradshaw (born 1970) is the Project Manager of both the Lucy mission and the "Advanced Topographic Laser Altimeter System" (ATLAS) of the ICESat-2 satellite.	IAU · 8791
8792 Christyljohnson	1978 VH_{11}	Christyl Chamblee Johnson (born 1967) is the "Deputy Director for Technology and Research Investments" at the Goddard Space Flight Center who has overseen and supported the formulation of the Lucy mission.	IAU · 8792
8793 Thomasmüller	1979 QX	Thomas G. Müller, a German astronomer, for his contribution to the study of minor planets in the thermal infrared. His observational work includes mid- to far-infrared photometry, spectroscopy and polarimetry with the Infrared Space Observatory. He has developed and applied various thermophysical models and techniques, in order to derive physical properties of minor planets. Because of the great accuracy he achieved, future telescope projects in the infrared will also benefit from these efforts, since minor planets are well suited as calibration targets, Name proposed and citation prepared by J. S. V. Lagerros.	JPL · 8793
8794 Joepatterson	1981 EA_{7}	Joseph Otis Patterson III (born 1946), a professor of astronomy at Columbia University.	JPL · 8794
8795 Dudorov	1981 EO_{9}	Alexander Egorovich Dudorov (born 1946), an astrophysicist at Chelyabinsk State University.	JPL · 8795
8796 Sonnett	1981 EA_{12}	Sarah Sonnett (born 1984), a postdoctoral fellow at the Jet Propulsion Laboratory.	JPL · 8796
8797 Duffard	1981 EU_{18}	Rene Duffard (born 1971), a postdoctoral research scientist at the Instituto Astrofisica Andalucia in Granada, Spain.	JPL · 8797
8798 Tarantino	1981 EF_{24}	Frederick A. Tarantino (born 1955), president of the Universities Space Research Association.	JPL · 8798
8799 Barnouin	1981 ER_{25}	Olivier Barnouin (born 1967), a scientist at the Johns Hopkins University Applied Physics Laboratory.	JPL · 8799
8800 Brophy	1981 EB_{26}	John R. Brophy (born 1956), a Principal Engineer at the Jet Propulsion Laboratory.	JPL · 8800

== 8801–8900 ==
back to top

Named minor planet	Provisional	This minor planet was named for...	Ref · Catalog
8801 Nugent	1981 EQ_{29}	Carolyn R. Nugent (born 1984), a postdoctoral researcher at the Jet Propulsion Laboratory.	JPL · 8801
8802 Negley	1981 EW_{31}	Scott Negley Jr. (born 1939) is a long-time educator of astronomy. Through his work as a high school planetarium director, he motivated several students to actively pursue a career in astronomy and physics.	JPL · 8802
8803 Kolyer	1981 EL_{34}	Deborah E. Schwartz Kolyer (born 1960), a supporting manager of science at the SETI Institute for 28 years.	JPL · 8803
8804 Eliason	1981 JB_{2}	Eric M. Eliason (born 1949), an American expert in image-processing techniques and image analysis for the U.S. Geological Survey's Astrogeologic Team, has used this expertise for data restoration and publishing activities in support of the Voyager and Mars Observer projects and the Clementine Mission to the Moon.	JPL · 8804
8805 Petrpetrov	1981 UM_{11}	Petr Petrovich Petrov (born 1945), a Ukrainian astrophysicist and leading scientist at the Crimean Astrophysical Observatory, is widely known for his work on the variability of young stars having solar mass. He investigated magnetic and accretive activity in T Tauri stars and developed a concept for the magnetic activity of young stars.	JPL · 8805
8806 Fetisov	1981 UU_{11}	Viacheslav Fetisov (born 1958), an outstanding Russian sportsman, ice-hockey player and champion of two Olympic Games.	JPL · 8806
8807 Schenk	1981 UD_{23}	Paul M. Schenk (born 1958), a planetary geologist at the Lunar and Planetary Institute, Houston.	JPL · 8807
8808 Luhmann	1981 UH_{28}	Janet G. Luhmann (born 1946), a Senior Space Fellow at the University of California Berkeley.	JPL · 8808
8809 Roversimonaco	1981 WE_{1}	Fabio Roversi Monaco (born 1938), the rector of the University of Bologna since 1985.	JPL · 8809
8810 Johnmcfarland	1982 JM_{1}	John McFarland (born 1948) has made a major contribution to promoting astronomy at Armagh Observatory. He is well known for his knowledge of astronomy and his short biography of Kenneth Essex Edgeworth, the Irish astronomer who predicted the Edgeworth-Kuiper belt.	JPL · 8810
8811 Waltherschmadel	1982 UX_{5}	Heinrich Erwin Walther Schmadel (1902–1944), German journalist and editor-in-chief of several newspapers. He was killed in World War II in Russia near Stalingrad. His story is only an example of the common tragedy between Germans and Russians. There are thousands of people who never saw their fathers. Among these is Walther's son, astronomer Lutz D. Schmadel.	JPL · 8811
8812 Kravtsov	1982 UY_{6}	Yurij Fedorovich Kravtsov, Ukrainian pilot and writer.	JPL · 8812
8813 Leviathan	1983 WF_{1}	The Leviathan of Parsonstown, the nickname of the great reflecting telescope at Birr Castle, County Offaly, Ireland.	JPL · 8813
8814 Rosseven	1983 XG	William Brendan Parsons, Seventh Earl of Rosse (born 1936).	JPL · 8814
8815 Deanregas	1984 DR	Dean Regas (born 1973) has been Cincinnati Observatory Center's outreach astronomer since 2000 and an educator to thousands.	JPL · 8815
8816 Gamow	1984 YN_{1}	George Gamow (1904–1968), a Soviet-American theoretical physicist and cosmologist. His main scientific achievements include the creation of alpha and beta decay theory and the theory of the exploding Universe. Gamow was also the first to decipher the genetic code. He worked at institutions around the world, in Odessa, Leningrad, Göttingen, Copenhagen, Cambridge, as well as in the U.S. Through his popular lectures, articles and books he promoted public interest in science. In 1956 he received the Calling Prize awarded by UNESCO for the popularization of science. Name suggested by S. P. Kapitza and supported by the discoverer.	JPL · 8816
8817 Roytraver	1985 JU_{1}	Roy Traver, American photographer, philosopher, teacher, innovator, gourmet cook, and friend of the discoverers	JPL · 8817
8818 Hermannbondi	1985 RW_{2}	Hermann Bondi (1919–2005), a British cosmologist, known for work on the steady-state theory of the universe, had an impressive career that encompassed mathematics, radar technology, energy, defence, ecology and humanism. As director general of the European Space Research Organization he was a leader in space research.	JPL · 8818
8819 Chrisbondi	1985 RR_{4}	Christine Bondi (née Stockman; 1923), a British astrophysicist and mathematician and wife of Hermann Bondi, carried out research with Fred Hoyle in Cambridge on the internal constitution of stars and later taught mathematics at the Reigate Sixth Form College. Active in humanism, she served on the British Humanist Education Committee for many years.	JPL · 8819
8820 Anjandersen	1985 VG	Anja C. Andersen (born 1965), a Danish astrophysicist, is an unusual combination of experimental, theoretical and observational work related to the properties and implications of dust particles. In 2005 she received the European Commission's Descartes Prize for outstanding excellence in science communication.	JPL · 8820
8822 Shuryanka	1987 RQ_{2}	Aleksandra Semenovna Morozova (born 1917), mother of the Ukrainian astronomer Lyudmila Karachkina, who discovered this minor planet.	MPC · 8822
8824 Genta	1988 BH	Genta Yamamoto (born 1942), a Japanese potter, began creating pottery at the age of 20 and is known for his efforts to revive "Hoshino ware", one of the traditional pottery styles of Japan. His works have a motif that imitates heavenly bodies. Known in Japan as "The Man who bakes a planet", he is working on a design in the style of a "star".	JPL · 8824
8826 Corneville	1988 PZ_{1}	Corneville, a small village in Normandy.	JPL · 8826
8827 Kollwitz	1988 PO_{2}	Käthe Kollwitz (1867–1945), a German graphic artist and sculptor.	JPL · 8827
8829 Buczkowski	1988 RV_{10}	Debra L. Buczkowski (born 1969), a staff member at the Johns Hopkins University Applied Physics Laboratory.	JPL · 8829
8831 Brändström	1989 CO_{5}	Elsa Brändström (1888–1948), a Swedish nurse and philanthropist, was the daughter of diplomat general Edvard Brändström. During World War I, she stood up beyond all measure for indigent German prisoners in Russia.	JPL · 8831
8832 Altenrath	1989 EC_{3}	Henricus Hubertus Altenrath (1832–1892), initiator and first director of the "Nijverheidsschool", a well-known Antwerp school for the teaching of technical professions. Under his direction, the school began teaching in Flemish, which was not common at that time. His name is still honored by the Association "Henric Altenrath". The discoverer has taught for many years at this school.	JPL · 8832
8833 Acer	1989 RW	Aceraceae, the maple family, with two genera and more than 100 species. One well-known species is Acer saccharum (sugar maple), the sap of which is used for maple syrup and maple sugar.	JPL · 8833
8834 Anacardium	1989 SX_{2}	Anacardiaceae, the cashew or mango family, with 80 genera and over 800 species of evergreen and deciduous trees, shrubs and climbing plants. Anacardium occidentale (western cashew) yields a delicious fruit.	JPL · 8834
8835 Annona	1989 SA_{3}	Annonaceae, the custard apple family, with more than 2000 species. The trees are mainly tropical and include the species Annona squamosa (sweetsop), which has a sweet, pulpy fruit.	JPL · 8835
8836 Aquifolium	1989 SU_{3}	Aquifoliaceae, the holly family, with 700 evergreens and deciduous species. Ilex aquifolium (English holly) belongs to this family, as does Ilex paraguariensis (Yerba maté), which makes a tasteful tea.	JPL · 8836
8837 London	1989 TF_{4}	London, UK	JPL · 8837
8839 Novichkova	1989 UB_{8}	Vera Stepanovna Novichkova (born 1937), a Ukrainian doctor and hematologist, is the founder and head of the blood-transfusion station at Bakhchisaraj regional hospital in the Crimea.	JPL · 8839
8842 Bennetmcinnes	1990 KF	Bennet McInnes (born 1929) was Secretary of the Royal Observatory, Edinburgh (1973–1987) and the Royal Observatory, Greenwich (1987–1989), and was involved in the establishment of the Isaac Newton Group of Telescopes in the Canary Islands.	IAU · 8842
8847 Huch	1990 TO_{3}	Ricarda Huch (1864–1947), a German novelist and poet, and critic of the fascist regime. Born into a prosperous commercial family, she earned a doctorate in history in Zurich in 1891, afterwards working as a librarian and teacher. In 1897 she decided to become a writer. Her novels and stories depict historical figures and events. She was a critic of the fascist regime, and her last unfinished work was to portray the German resistance movement. In 1933, she retired from the Prussian Academy of Arts. Name proposed by the first discoverer, Freimut Börngen.	JPL · 8847
8849 Brighton	1990 VZ_{4}	Brighton, UK	JPL · 8849
8850 Bignonia	1990 VQ_{6}	Bignoniaceae, the catalpa family, with about 100 genera and 700 species with tubular flowers. Among them are Bignonia capreolata (trumpet flower) and Crescentia cujete (calabash).	JPL · 8850
8851 Okudamasataka	1990 XB	Masataka Okuda, Japanese amateur astronomer.	IAU · 8851
8852 Buxus	1991 GG_{6}	Buxaceae, the box family, with four or five genera and some 60 species of evergreen trees and shrubs. Buxus sempervirens (English boxwood) has very small leaves and is used for hedges and borders.	JPL · 8852
8853 Gerdlehmann	1991 GC_{10}	Gerhard Lehmann (born 1960), a German amateur astronomer and discoverer of minor planets, who with Jens Kandler measured some 70 precise positions of minor planets and comets from photographic plates obtained at Drebach. Among the 1500 positions he has derived after switching to CCD equipment in 1994 are some for the 1998 opposition of this object. The Drebach positions have made more than 30 Tautenburg objects appropriate for numbering. A teacher of physics and astronomy, Lehmann is also a popularizer of astronomy and since 1997 the head of the minor planets section of the Vereinigung der Sternfreunde.	JPL · 8853
8855 Miwa	1991 JL	Miwa Saito, a junior high school science teacher. She has made an effort to popularize science and astronomy on her World Wide Web site.	JPL · 8855
8856 Celastrus	1991 LH_{1}	Celastraceae, the staff-tree family, with 100 genera and over 1000 species including many climbing plants. These include Celastrus scandens (bittersweet) and Euonymus europaeus (European spindle tree), the latter having pink fruit and orange seeds.	JPL · 8856
8857 Cercidiphyllum	1991 PA_{7}	Cercidiphyllaceae, a family of plants with only one member, Cercidiphyllum japonicum (katsura tree), regarded as a plant of primitive origin. It was originally classified as belonging to the magnolias, but it seems more related to the planes.	JPL · 8857
8858 Cornus	1991 PT_{7}	Cornaceae, known as dogwoods, a family of flowering plants, with about 12 genera and 100 species of evergreens, deciduous trees and shrubs. Species include Cornus sanguinea (red dogwood) and Cornus florida (flowering dogwood).	JPL · 8858
8860 Rohloff	1991 TE_{5}	Ralf-Rainer Rohloff (born 1960), a design engineer on the staff of the Max-Planck-Institut für Astronomie.	JPL · 8860
8861 Jenskandler	1991 TF_{7}	Jens Kandler, a German amateur astronomer.	JPL · 8861
8862 Takayukiota	1991 UZ	Takayuki Ota, Japanese amateur astronomer	JPL · 8862
8864 Aikawa	1991 VU	Reijin Aikawa, Japanese amateur astronomer who lives in Kawagoe City, Saitama.	IAU · 8864
8865 Yakiimo	1992 AF	Yakiimo, the observing station in Shizuoka prefecture, where this object was discovered.	JPL · 8865
8866 Tanegashima	1992 BR	The island Tanegashima, southern Japan.	JPL · 8866
8867 Tubbiolo	1992 BF_{4}	Andrew F. Tubbiolo is a multitalented engineer and enthusiast of space flight working at the University of Arizona's Lunar and Planetary Laboratory. He built some of the electronics on the successful Mars Pathfinder Lander and a complex interface for Spacewatch data acquisition. Discoverer of periodic comet P/2005 E1 (P/Tubbiolo).	JPL · 8867
8868 Hjorter	1992 EE_{7}	Olof Hiorter (1696–1750), Swedish professor of astronomy at Uppsala in 1732–1737 and after 1746, independently discovered comet C/1743 X1 five days after Klinken-berg. With Celsius, he discovered the magnetic nature of aurorae. He donated his library to the Uppsala Observatory, and it is still the rarest part of that collection.	JPL · 8868
8869 Olausgutho	1992 EE_{11}	Olaus Johannis Gutho (died 1516), was a Swedish student from the island of Gotland at Uppsala University from 1477 to 1486. His carefully written lecture notes (in seven volumes), the only ones preserved from that time, give good examples of the curricula in those days.	JPL · 8869
8870 von Zeipel	1992 EQ_{11}	Edvard Hugo von Zeipel (1873–1959), Swedish professor of astronomy at Uppsala University during 1911–1920, is still well known for his theoretical work in celestial mechanics and astrophysics.	JPL · 8870
8871 Svanberg	1992 EA_{22}	Gustaf Svanberg (1802–1882), Swedish professor of astronomy at Uppsala University from 1842 to 1878, built the present building of Uppsala Astronomical Observatory and founded the meteorological observatory. His autobiography gives a good insight into the academic life in Uppsala during the nineteenth century.	JPL · 8871
8872 Ebenum	1992 GA_{4}	Ebenaceae, a family of flowering plants in the ebony family, with only two genera and 500 species. Male and female flowers are usually borne on separate plants. The Diospyros genus dominates, the fruit of the Diospyros virginiana (persimmon) being good to eat. Diospyros ebenum (Macassar ebony) is a valuable wood.	JPL · 8872
8874 Showashinzan	1992 UY_{3}	Showashinzan, a new volcanic mountain in Hokkaido that grew during 1943–1945.	JPL · 8874
8875 Fernie	1992 UP_{10}	J. Donald Fernie (born 1933), professor emeritus of astronomy at the University of Toronto and former director of the David Dunlap Observatory, is known for his work on variable stars, galactic structure, photoelectric photometry, and the history of astronomy of the nineteenth and twentieth centuries.	JPL · 8875
8877 Rentaro	1993 BK_{2}	Rentaro Taki (1879–1903), a Japan composer. After he finished his schooling in Japan he went to Germany and trained at the Music Academy in Leipzig. Not long afterward, however, he developed tuberculosis and returned to Japan to die. His songs, which include "The Moon over the Ruins of a Castle", are among the best loved in Japan.	JPL · 8877
8881 Prialnik	1993 FW_{36}	Dina Prialnik, an Israeli astronomer, is a leading expert in the modeling of the thermal evolution of cometary nuclei. She is also known for her work on white dwarfs and the mechanisms of nova outbursts.	JPL · 8881
8882 Sakaetamura	1994 AP_{2}	Sakae Tamura (born 1911), a founder of Gekkan Tenmon Guide ("Monthly Astronomy Guide") in 1965 and served as its chief editor until 1971.	JPL · 8882
8883 Miyazakihayao	1994 BS_{4}	Hayao Miyazaki (born 1941), an animator and movie director.	JPL · 8883
8885 Sette	1994 EL_{3}	Giancarlo Sette (born 1927), Italian amateur astronomer.	JPL · 8885
8886 Elaeagnus	1994 EG_{6}	Elaeagnaceae, the oleaster family with three genera and about 50 species. In many species the flowers develop into edible fruits. Elaeagnus augustifolia (Russian olive) has important commercial value for its fruits.	JPL · 8886
8887 Scheeres	1994 LK_{1}	Daniel J. Scheeres (born 1963), an American aerospace engineer in the Department of Aerospace Engineering and Engineering Mechanics at Iowa State University. He has pioneered the investigation of the dynamics of orbits close to small, irregularly shaped minor planets. His research has included studies of the short-term evolution and the long-term stability of orbits around radar-derived models of 4179 Toutatis and 4769 Castalia. His work has far-reaching implications for the operation of spacecraft orbiting minor planets, for the cosmogony of satellites of minor planets and for understanding the distribution of non-escaping impact ejecta on small bodies.	JPL · 8887
8888 Tartaglia	1994 NT_{1}	Niccolò Fontana Tartaglia (1499–1557), an Italian mathematician, engineer and topographer.	JPL · 8888
8889 Mockturtle	1994 OC	The Mock Turtle, character in Alice's Adventures in Wonderland.	JPL · 8889
8890 Montaigne	1994 PS_{37}	Michel de Montaigne (1533–1592) was a French philosopher much preoccupied by the decline of intellectual optimism from the Renaissance through the Protestant Reformation. His Essays, intimate self-portraits advocating travel, reading and conversation, mark a new approach to literature.	JPL · 8890
8891 Irokawa	1994 RC_{1}	Hiroshi Irokawa (born 1930), chief editor of Gekkan Tenmon Guide ("Monthly Astronomy Guide") from 1972 to 1974.	JPL · 8891
8892 Kakogawa	1994 RC_{11}	Kakogawa, the city in the southwestern part of Hyogo prefecture.	JPL · 8892
8895 Nha	1995 QN	Nha Il-Seong (born 1932), professor emeritus at Yonsei University, Korea, on the occasion of the dedication of his Museum of Astronomy in Yecheon. Professor Nha's major works include photometry of close binary stars, the discovery of the apsidal motion in the CW Cep system and contributions to the history of Asian astronomy. He has served as president of the Korean Astronomical Society and director of Yonsei University Observatory. Name proposed by the discoverer following a suggestion by K. Hurukawa. Citation by I. Hasegawa.	JPL · 8895
8897 Defelice	1995 SX	Aurelio De Felice (1915–1996) was an Italian sculptor.	MPC · 8897
8898 Linnaea	1995 SL_{5}	Linnaea Barton Keammerer (1980–1992) died in an accidental shooting. An avid student of nature, she was told while observing comet 1P/Halley in 1986 that she would almost certainly live to see it again. Linnaea enjoyed writing poetry: "One star silent in the sky, Twinkling, yet I don't know why.".	JPL · 8898
8899 Hughmiller	1995 SX_{29}	Hugh Miller (1802–1856) was a pioneering Scottish geologist who made significant contributions to the study of fossils, especially in the Old Red Sandstone. With his publications he had a worldwide influence on professional science and its public understanding. His extensive collection was donated to the Royal Scottish Museum	JPL · 8899
8900 AAVSO	1995 UD_{2}	AAVSO, the American Association of Variable Star Observers, one of the premier astronomical organizations, was founded in 1911 by amateur William Tyler Olcott, following Harvard astronomer Edward C. Pickering's prescient vision of a collaboration between amateurs and professionals in the name of science.	JPL · 8900

== 8901–9000 ==
back to top

Named minor planet	Provisional	This minor planet was named for...	Ref · Catalog
8903 Paulcruikshank	1995 UB_{7}	Paul Shammim Cruikshank (1964–2015), an American-Afghan humorist and musician	JPL · 8903
8904 Yoshihara	1995 VY	Masahiro Yoshihara (born 1928), of Yokkaichi, Japan, has been an amateur astronomer since 1942. From 1943 to 1951 he very actively observed variable stars. On 1946 Feb. 9 he was an independent discoverer of the outburst of the recurrent nova T Coronas Borealis.	JPL · 8904
8905 Bankakuko	1995 WJ	Kakuko Ban (born 1967), Japanese staff member of the planetarium section of the Hiroshima Children's Museum.	JPL · 8905
8906 Yano	1995 WF_{2}	Hajime Yano (born 1967), an expert in cosmic dust research and solar system exploration and a pioneer of in-situ studies of meteoroid and orbital debris in space. He also led the Japanese team for airborne observations of the 1998–2002 Leonid meteor storms and developed the sampling device for ISAS' MUSES-C mission.	JPL · 8906
8907 Takaji	1995 WM_{5}	Takaji Kato (born 1947), an associate professor at the Institute of Space and Astronautical Science.	JPL · 8907
8909 Ohnishitaka	1995 WL_{7}	Takafumi Ohnishi (born 1971), a systems engineer at Fujitsu Limited.	JPL · 8909
8911 Kawaguchijun	1995 YA	Kawaguchi Jun'ichiro (born 1955), project manager of the MUSES-C mission, designed to deliver the world's first sample-and-return spacecraft.	JPL · 8911
8912 Ohshimatake	1995 YN_{1}	Takeshi Oshima (born 1966) helped develop the MIC (Mars imaging camera) and SICPU (CPU board for science instruments) loaded on the first Japanese Mars exploration spacecraft "Nozomi". As a systems manager of NTSpace Ltd., he also helped develop the first Japanese sample-return Spacecraft, MUSES-C.	JPL · 8912
8913 Shohinighose	1995 YB_{2}	Shohini Ghose, Indian-Canadian professor of physics and computer science at Wilfrid Laurier University.	IAU · 8913
8914 Nickjames	1995 YP_{2}	Nick James (born 1962), a leading CCD imager and photometrist who has produced large numbers of precision light curves of cataclysmic variables and images of unusual variables stars and comets.	JPL · 8914
8915 Sawaishujiro	1995 YK_{3}	Shujiro Sawai (born 1966), an engineer in charge of the chemical propulsion system of MUSES-C, the Japanese sample-return mission.	JPL · 8915
8917 Tianjindaxue	1996 EU_{2}	Tianjin University (Tianjindaxue), founded in 1895 as Peiyang University, is the oldest modern institution of higher education in China and has developed into one of the leading multidisciplinary research universities of the country, in engineering in particular.	JPL · 8917
8919 Ouyangziyuan	1996 TU_{13}	Ouyang Ziyuan (born 1935) is a Chinese cosmochemist, geochemist and space advocate. As Chief Scientist for China's Lunar Exploration Program (LEP), he has been responsible for the development of the long-term strategic plans for China's LEP	JPL · 8919
8922 Kumanodake	1996 VQ_{30}	Zao Kumanodake, located between Miyagi and Yamagata prefectures in the northern part of mainland Japan, was designated as a national park in 1963. Mt. Kumanodake has a height of 1841 meters.	JPL · 8922
8923 Yamakawa	1996 WQ_{1}	Hiroshi Yamakawa (born 1965), an interplanetary trajectory and mission designer at ISAS.	JPL · 8923
8924 Iruma	1996 XA_{32}	The Iruma area, Saitama prefecture, Japan.	JPL · 8924
8925 Boattini	1996 XG_{32}	Andrea Boattini (born 1969). an Italian astronomer and discoverer of minor planets. After developing a growing interest in minor planets, he graduated in 1996 from the University of Bologna with a thesis on near-earth objects. He is involved in various projects related to NEO follow-up and search programs, with special interest in the NEO class known as Atens. He currently works at the Istituto di Astrofisica Spaziale of the National Research Council in Rome. The discoverers have started their astrometric activity on minor planets together with him..	JPL · 8925
8926 Abemasanao	1996 YK	Masanao Abe (born 1967), a planetary scientist at the Institute of Space and Astronautical Science.	JPL · 8926
8927 Ryojiro	1996 YT	Ryojiro Akiba (born 1930), a professor of astronautics and former director-general of the Institute of Space and Astronautical Science.	JPL · 8927
8929 Haginoshinji	1996 YQ_{2}	Shinji Hagino (born 1959), an engineer who worked on the system design of Japanese scientific satellites such as HALCA (space VLBI satellite) and Akebono (aurora observation satellite).	JPL · 8929
8930 Kubota	1997 AX_{3}	Takashi Kubota (born 1960) works on intelligent robotics exploration at the Institute of Space and Astronautical Science. He was engaged in developing guidance, navigation and control for touchdown and asteroidal surface exploration by a rover in the Hayabusa sample return mission from (25143) Itokawa.	JPL · 8930
8931 Hirokimatsuo	1997 AC_{4}	Hiroki Matsuo, former director general at the Institute of Space and Astronautical Science.	JPL · 8931
8932 Nagatomo	1997 AR_{4}	Makoto Nagatomo (born 1937), a pioneer in the field of electric propulsion.	JPL · 8932
8933 Kurobe	1997 AU_{6}	The Kurobe ravine, in Toyama prefecture, is the largest and deepest in Japan.	JPL · 8933
8934 Nishimurajun	1997 AQ_{12}	Jun Nishimura (born 1927) works in the fields of cosmic-ray physics and space systems engineering, including scientific ballooning. He served as the director general of the Institute of Space and Astronautical Science between 1988 and 1992, when the Japanese government approved the development of the M-V rocket.	JPL · 8934
8935 Beccaria	1997 AV_{13}	Cesare Beccaria (1738–1794) was an Italian Enlightenment thinker. In his most important work, Dei delitti e delle pene, Beccaria took sides against the death penalty, supporting the educational function of punishment.	JPL · 8935
8936 Gianni	1997 AS_{17}	Gianni Ierman (born 1955), Italian amateur astronomer, who was the first member to join the Farra d´Isonzo observatory club in 1969. He was the owner of the first club telescope and was the club president in the 1980s	JPL · 8936
8937 Gassan	1997 AK_{19}	Gassan, a volcanic mountain in central Yamagata prefecture.	JPL · 8937
8939 Onodajunjiro	1997 BU_{1}	Junjiro Onoda (born 1946), director of the Mu-series satellite launcher program of the Institute of Space and Astronautical Science.	JPL · 8939
8940 Yakushimaru	1997 BA_{2}	Hiroko Yakushimaru (born 1964), a Japanese actress and singer.	JPL · 8940
8941 Junsaito	1997 BL_{2}	Jun Saito (born 1962), a Japan mineralogist and planetologist.	JPL · 8941
8942 Takagi	1997 BR_{2}	Yasuhiko Takagi (born 1958), a Japanese planetary scientist, has investigated impact fragmentation phenomena and the origin of minor-planet families based on laboratory experiments. He also contributed to the Near-Infrared Spectrometer on board the Hayabusa spacecraft.	JPL · 8942
8943 Stefanozavka	1997 BH_{3}	Stefano Zavka (1972–2007), was an Italian Alpine guide from Terni. He also took part in two expeditions on K2. After reaching the summit, he disappeared during the descent.	JPL · 8943
8944 Ortigara	1997 BF_{9}	Mount Ortigara, located near the Asiago Astrophysical Observatory, is one of the highest peaks in the Asiago Tableland and was the location of one of the most famous and bloodiest alpine battles of World War I.	JPL · 8944
8945 Cavaradossi	1997 CM	Cavaradossi, character in Puccini's opera Tosca. A revolutionary and fighter against despotism, Cavaradossi is imprisoned and condemned to die.	JPL · 8945
8946 Yoshimitsu	1997 CO	Tetsuo Yoshimitsu (born 1970) works on research and development of planetary rovers and is the chief engineer of the asteroid surface explorer MINERVA for the Hayabusa mission. The novel technology resulting from his studies of mobile systems on minor-planet surfaces in a microgravity environment was installed in MINERVA.	JPL · 8946
8947 Mizutani	1997 CH_{26}	Hitoshi Mizutani (born 1944) works mainly on the origin and evolution of the solar system and internal structures of planets. He has been a professor at the Institute of Space and Astronautical Science and played a leading role in Japanese lunar and planetary exploration.	JPL · 8947
8952 ODAS	1998 EG_{2}	ODAS, the OCA-DLR Asteroid Survey, operated the first and only quasiautomatic European near-Earth-asteroid search program from 1996 to 1999. Five NEAs, ten Mars-crossers and a comet were discovered in the course of this survey. ODAS also produced more than 44~000 astrometric positions of 2200 new minor planets.	JPL · 8952
8954 Baral	1998 FK_{62}	Jessika Baral (born 1999) is a finalist in the 2012 Broadcom MASTERS, a math and science competition for middle-school students, for her biochemistry, medicine, health science, and microbiology project.	JPL · 8954
8957 Koujounotsuki	1998 FM_{125}	Koujounotsuki, musical piece composed by Rentaro Taki.	JPL · 8957
8958 Stargazer	1998 FJ_{126}	This name honors in general those who since time immemorial have gazed up at the night sky in wonderment. It honors in particular the noble pursuit of amateur astronomy.	JPL · 8958
8959 Oenanthe	2550 P-L	The wheatear, or Oenanthe oenanthe.	JPL · 8959
8960 Luscinioides	2575 P-L	The Savi's warbler, or Locustella luscinioides.	JPL · 8960
8961 Schoenobaenus	2702 P-L	The sedge warbler, or Acrocephalus schoenobaenus.	JPL · 8961
8962 Noctua	2771 P-L	The little owl, or Athene noctua.	JPL · 8962
8963 Collurio	4651 P-L	The red-backed shrike, or Lanius collurio.	JPL · 8963
8964 Corax	7643 P-L	The raven, or Corvus corax.	JPL · 8964
8965 Citrinella	9511 P-L	The yellowhammer, or Emberiza citrinella.	JPL · 8965
8966 Hortulana	3287 T-1	The ortolan bunting, or Emberiza hortulana.	JPL · 8966
8967 Calandra	4878 T-1	The corn bunting, or Miliaria calandra.	JPL · 8967
8968 Europaeus	1212 T-2	The nightjar, or Caprimulgus europaeus.	JPL · 8968
8969 Alexandrinus	1218 T-2	The Kentish plover, or Charadrius alexandrinus.	JPL · 8969
8970 Islandica	1355 T-2	The Barrow's goldeneye, or Bucephala islandica.	JPL · 8970
8971 Leucocephala	2256 T-2	The white-headed duck, or Oxyura leucocephala.	JPL · 8971
8972 Sylvatica	2319 T-2	The Andalusian hemipode, or Turnix sylvatica.	JPL · 8972
8973 Pratincola	3297 T-2	The wading bird Glareola pratincola, or collared pratincole.	JPL · 8973
8974 Gregaria	3357 T-2	The sociable plover, or Chettusia gregaria.	JPL · 8974
8975 Atthis	4076 T-2	The kingfisher, or Alcedo atthis.	JPL · 8975
8976 Leucura	4221 T-2	The black wheatear, or Oenanthe leucura.	JPL · 8976
8977 Paludicola	4272 T-2	The aquatic warbler, or Acrocephalus paludicola.	JPL · 8977
8978 Barbatus	3109 T-3	The lammergeier, or Gypaetus barbatus.	JPL · 8978
8979 Clanga	3476 T-3	The greater spotted eagle, or Aquila clanga.	JPL · 8979
8980 Heliaca	4190 T-3	The imperial eagle, or Aquila heliaca.	JPL · 8980
8982 Oreshek	1973 SQ_{3}	Oreshek, an ancient Russian fortress built in 1323.	JPL · 8982
8983 Rayakazakova	1977 ED_{1}	Raisa Konstantinovna Kazakova, a celestial mechanician at the Keldysh Institute of Applied Mathematics.	JPL · 8983
8984 Derevyanko	1977 QD_{3}	Tatiana Timofeevna Derevyanko, a cinema-artist and director of the Dovzhenko Museum at the Dovzhenko Film Studio in Kiev.	JPL · 8984
8985 Tula	1978 PV_{3}	Tula, a city in Russian Federation, the administrative focus of the region and prominent industrial and cultural center.	JPL · 8985
8986 Kineyayasuyo	1978 VN_{2}	Yasuyo Kineya, elder sister of Japanese astronomer Kōichirō Tomita, who discovered this minor planet.	MPC · 8986
8987 Cavancuddy	1978 VD_{4}	Cavan Michael Cuddy (born 1981) is the "System Design Lead" and "Spacecraft Responsible Systems Engineer" of the Lucy mission.	IAU · 8987
8988 Hansenkoharcheck	1979 MA_{4}	Candice J. Hansen-Koharcheck (b. 1953), an American planetary scientist.	IAU · 8988
8990 Compassion	1980 DN	Compassion – named to honor the victims of the September 11 attacks	MPC · 8990
8991 Solidarity	1980 PV_{1}	Solidarity – named to honor the victims of the September 11 attacks	MPC · 8991
8992 Magnanimity	1980 TE_{7}	Magnanimity – named to honor the victims of the September 11 attacks	MPC · 8992
8993 Ingstad	1980 UL	Helge Ingstad (1899–2001), was a Norwegian pioneer explorer and archaeologist. Foremost among his many achievements was his and his wife's discovery of remains from the Viking settlements on Newfoundland. This proved that the Vikings reached North America, probably as the first Europeans.	JPL · 8993
8994 Kashkashian	1980 VG	Kim Kashkashian (born 1952), an Armenian-American classical violist. She is known for her particular empathy with the works of composers of the late-twentieth century.	JPL · 8994
8995 Rachelstevenson	1981 EB_{9}	Rachel Stevenson (born 1984), a postdoctoral fellow at the Jet Propulsion Laboratory.	JPL · 8995
8996 Waynedwards	1981 EC_{10}	Wayne N. Edwards (born 1977), a research scientist with the Canadian Hazards Information Service.	JPL · 8996
8997 Davidblewett	1981 ES_{14}	David T. Blewett (born 1959), a senior staff member at the Johns Hopkins University Applied Physics Laboratory.	JPL · 8997
8998 Matthewizawa	1981 EG_{23}	Matthew Richard Mitsuomi Izawa (born 1979), a postdoctoral researcher at the University of Winnipeg.	JPL · 8998
8999 Tashadunn	1981 EJ_{28}	Tasha L. Dunn (born 1978), a professor in the Department of Geology at Colby College.	JPL · 8999
9000 Hal	1981 JO	HAL 9000, fictional computer in Space Odyssey series	MPC · 9000

back to top

Preceded by 7,001–8,000	Meanings of minor-planet names List of minor planets: 8,001–9,000	Succeeded by 9,001–10,000
