= List of minor planets: 8001–9000 =

The following is a partial list of minor planets, running from minor-planet number 8001 through 9000, inclusive. The primary data for this and other partial lists is based on JPL's "Small-Body Orbital Elements" and data available from the Minor Planet Center. Critical list information is also provided by the MPC, unless otherwise specified from Lowell Observatory. A detailed description of the table's columns and additional sources are given on the main page including a complete list of every page in this series, and a statistical break-up on the dynamical classification of minor planets.

Also see the summary list of all named bodies in numerical and alphabetical order, and the corresponding naming citations for the number range of this particular list. New namings may only be added to this list after official publication, as the preannouncement of names is condemned by the Working Group for Small Bodies Nomenclature of the International Astronomical Union.

Near-Earth obj.	MBA (inner)	MBA (outer)	Centaur
Mars-crosser	MBA (middle)	Jupiter trojan	Trans-Neptunian obj.
Unclassified

== 8001–8100 ==
Designation			Discovery			Properties		Ref
Permanent	Provisional	Named after	Date	Site	Discoverer(s)	Category	Diam.	Ref
8001 Ramsden	1986 TR_{3}	Ramsden	October 4, 1986	Kleť	A. Mrkos	THM	13 km (8.1 mi)	MPC · JPL
8002 Tonyevans	1986 XF_{5}	Tonyevans	December 4, 1986	Kleť	A. Mrkos	·	4.6 km (2.9 mi)	MPC · JPL
8003 Kelvin	1987 RJ	Kelvin	September 1, 1987	La Silla	E. W. Elst	·	4.9 km (3.0 mi)	MPC · JPL
8004	1987 RX	—	September 12, 1987	La Silla	H. Debehogne	·	8.6 km (5.3 mi)	MPC · JPL
8005 Albinadubois	1988 MJ	Albinadubois	June 16, 1988	Palomar	E. F. Helin	·	7.5 km (4.7 mi)	MPC · JPL
8006 Tacchini	1988 QU	Tacchini	August 22, 1988	Bologna	San Vittore	·	6.5 km (4.0 mi)	MPC · JPL
8007	1988 RU_{6}	—	September 8, 1988	La Silla	H. Debehogne	MIS	9.0 km (5.6 mi)	MPC · JPL
8008	1988 TQ_{4}	—	October 10, 1988	Gekko	Y. Oshima	AST	13 km (8.1 mi)	MPC · JPL
8009 Béguin	1989 BA_{1}	Béguin	January 25, 1989	Caussols	C. Pollas	·	5.9 km (3.7 mi)	MPC · JPL
8010 Böhnhardt	1989 GB_{1}	Böhnhardt	April 3, 1989	La Silla	E. W. Elst	(1298)	16 km (9.9 mi)	MPC · JPL
8011 Saijokeiichi	1989 WG_{7}	Saijokeiichi	November 29, 1989	Kitami	K. Endate, K. Watanabe	·	7.0 km (4.3 mi)	MPC · JPL
8012	1990 HO_{3}	—	April 29, 1990	Siding Spring	A. Żytkow, M. J. Irwin	THM	8.7 km (5.4 mi)	MPC · JPL
8013 Gordonmoore	1990 KA	Gordonmoore	May 18, 1990	Palomar	E. F. Helin	AMO +1 km (0.62 mi)	2.3 km (1.4 mi)	MPC · JPL
8014	1990 MF	—	June 26, 1990	Palomar	E. F. Helin	APO · PHA	700 m (2,300 ft)	MPC · JPL
8015 Marksimons	1990 QT_{2}	Marksimons	August 24, 1990	Palomar	H. E. Holt	·	3.1 km (1.9 mi)	MPC · JPL
8016	1990 QW_{10}	—	August 27, 1990	Palomar	H. E. Holt	·	3.6 km (2.2 mi)	MPC · JPL
8017	1990 RM_{5}	—	September 15, 1990	Palomar	H. E. Holt	·	3.3 km (2.1 mi)	MPC · JPL
8018	1990 SW	—	September 16, 1990	Palomar	H. E. Holt	·	4.3 km (2.7 mi)	MPC · JPL
8019 Karachkina	1990 TH_{12}	Karachkina	October 14, 1990	Tautenburg Observatory	L. D. Schmadel, F. Börngen	·	3.0 km (1.9 mi)	MPC · JPL
8020 Erzgebirge	1990 TV_{13}	Erzgebirge	October 14, 1990	Tautenburg Observatory	F. Börngen, L. D. Schmadel	·	5.2 km (3.2 mi)	MPC · JPL
8021 Walter	1990 UO_{2}	Walter	October 22, 1990	Palomar	C. S. Shoemaker, D. H. Levy	PHO	6.3 km (3.9 mi)	MPC · JPL
8022 Scottcrossfield	1990 VD_{7}	Scottcrossfield	November 10, 1990	Kleť	A. Mrkos	·	8.3 km (5.2 mi)	MPC · JPL
8023 Josephwalker	1991 DD	Josephwalker	February 17, 1991	Oohira	T. Urata	·	3.5 km (2.2 mi)	MPC · JPL
8024 Robertwhite	1991 FN	Robertwhite	March 17, 1991	Palomar	E. F. Helin	H	1.7 km (1.1 mi)	MPC · JPL
8025 Forrestpeterson	1991 FB_{4}	Forrestpeterson	March 22, 1991	La Silla	H. Debehogne	MRX	6.7 km (4.2 mi)	MPC · JPL
8026 Johnmckay	1991 JA_{1}	Johnmckay	May 8, 1991	Palomar	E. F. Helin	H · moon · slow	1.7 km (1.1 mi)	MPC · JPL
8027 Robertrushworth	1991 PB_{12}	Robertrushworth	August 7, 1991	Palomar	H. E. Holt	·	20 km (12 mi)	MPC · JPL
8028 Joeengle	1991 QE	Joeengle	August 30, 1991	Siding Spring	R. H. McNaught	·	19 km (12 mi)	MPC · JPL
8029 Miltthompson	1991 RR_{30}	Miltthompson	September 15, 1991	Palomar	H. E. Holt	(1298)	16 km (9.9 mi)	MPC · JPL
8030 Williamknight	1991 SK	Williamknight	September 29, 1991	Siding Spring	R. H. McNaught	slow	21 km (13 mi)	MPC · JPL
8031 Williamdana	1992 ER	Williamdana	March 7, 1992	Kushiro	S. Ueda, H. Kaneda	·	4.6 km (2.9 mi)	MPC · JPL
8032 Michaeladams	1992 ES_{1}	Michaeladams	March 8, 1992	Kushiro	S. Ueda, H. Kaneda	·	9.0 km (5.6 mi)	MPC · JPL
8033	1992 FY_{1}	—	March 26, 1992	Kushiro	S. Ueda, H. Kaneda	·	6.1 km (3.8 mi)	MPC · JPL
8034 Akka	1992 LR	Akka	June 3, 1992	Palomar	C. S. Shoemaker, E. M. Shoemaker	AMO +1 km (0.62 mi)	880 m (2,890 ft)	MPC · JPL
8035	1992 TB	—	October 2, 1992	Kitt Peak	Spacewatch	APO +1 km (0.62 mi)	1.4 km (0.87 mi)	MPC · JPL
8036 Maehara	1992 UG_{4}	Maehara	October 26, 1992	Kitami	K. Endate, K. Watanabe	·	15 km (9.3 mi)	MPC · JPL
8037	1993 HO_{1}	—	April 20, 1993	Siding Spring	R. H. McNaught	AMO +1 km (0.62 mi)	1.7 km (1.1 mi)	MPC · JPL
8038	1993 JG	—	May 11, 1993	Nachi-Katsuura	Y. Shimizu, T. Urata	·	4.4 km (2.7 mi)	MPC · JPL
8039 Grandprism	1993 RB_{16}	Grandprism	September 15, 1993	La Silla	H. Debehogne, E. W. Elst	·	2.5 km (1.6 mi)	MPC · JPL
8040 Utsumikazuhiko	1993 SY_{3}	Utsumikazuhiko	September 16, 1993	Kitami	K. Endate, K. Watanabe	(5) · slow	5.4 km (3.4 mi)	MPC · JPL
8041 Masumoto	1993 VR_{2}	Masumoto	November 15, 1993	Kashihara	F. Uto	EUN	9.0 km (5.6 mi)	MPC · JPL
8042	1994 AX_{2}	—	January 12, 1994	Kushiro	S. Ueda, H. Kaneda	·	8.2 km (5.1 mi)	MPC · JPL
8043 Fukuhara	1994 XE_{1}	Fukuhara	December 6, 1994	Oizumi	T. Kobayashi	·	4.6 km (2.9 mi)	MPC · JPL
8044 Tsuchiyama	1994 YT	Tsuchiyama	December 28, 1994	Oizumi	T. Kobayashi	·	11 km (6.8 mi)	MPC · JPL
8045 Kamiyama	1995 AW	Kamiyama	January 6, 1995	Oizumi	T. Kobayashi	EUN	11 km (6.8 mi)	MPC · JPL
8046 Ajiki	1995 BU	Ajiki	January 25, 1995	Oizumi	T. Kobayashi	PHO	5.4 km (3.4 mi)	MPC · JPL
8047 Akikinoshita	1995 BT_{3}	Akikinoshita	January 31, 1995	Oizumi	T. Kobayashi	·	5.6 km (3.5 mi)	MPC · JPL
8048 Andrle	1995 DB_{1}	Andrle	February 22, 1995	Kleť	M. Tichý, Z. Moravec	EOS	11 km (6.8 mi)	MPC · JPL
8049 Janvier	1996 FL_{2}	Janvier	March 17, 1996	Haleakalā	NEAT	KOR	6.6 km (4.1 mi)	MPC · JPL
8050 Beishida	1996 ST	Beishida	September 18, 1996	Xinglong	SCAP	·	2.4 km (1.5 mi)	MPC · JPL
8051 Pistoria	1997 PP_{4}	Pistoria	August 13, 1997	San Marcello	L. Tesi, G. Cattani	·	2.7 km (1.7 mi)	MPC · JPL
8052 Novalis	2093 P-L	Novalis	September 24, 1960	Palomar	C. J. van Houten, I. van Houten-Groeneveld, T. Gehrels	EOS	9.5 km (5.9 mi)	MPC · JPL
8053 Kleist	4082 P-L	Kleist	September 25, 1960	Palomar	C. J. van Houten, I. van Houten-Groeneveld, T. Gehrels	NYS	5.0 km (3.1 mi)	MPC · JPL
8054 Brentano	4581 P-L	Brentano	September 24, 1960	Palomar	C. J. van Houten, I. van Houten-Groeneveld, T. Gehrels	slow	4.2 km (2.6 mi)	MPC · JPL
8055 Arnim	5004 P-L	Arnim	October 17, 1960	Palomar	C. J. van Houten, I. van Houten-Groeneveld, T. Gehrels	·	8.4 km (5.2 mi)	MPC · JPL
8056 Tieck	6038 P-L	Tieck	September 24, 1960	Palomar	C. J. van Houten, I. van Houten-Groeneveld, T. Gehrels	·	4.7 km (2.9 mi)	MPC · JPL
8057 Hofmannsthal	4034 T-1	Hofmannsthal	March 26, 1971	Palomar	C. J. van Houten, I. van Houten-Groeneveld, T. Gehrels	·	8.2 km (5.1 mi)	MPC · JPL
8058 Zuckmayer	3241 T-3	Zuckmayer	October 16, 1977	Palomar	C. J. van Houten, I. van Houten-Groeneveld, T. Gehrels	·	5.0 km (3.1 mi)	MPC · JPL
8059 Deliyannis	1957 JP	Deliyannis	May 6, 1957	Brooklyn	Indiana University	EUN	12 km (7.5 mi)	MPC · JPL
8060 Anius	1973 SD_{1}	Anius	September 19, 1973	Palomar	C. J. van Houten, I. van Houten-Groeneveld, T. Gehrels	L4 · (8060)	38 km (24 mi)	MPC · JPL
8061 Gaudium	1975 UF	Gaudium	October 27, 1975	Zimmerwald	P. Wild	THM	9.5 km (5.9 mi)	MPC · JPL
8062 Okhotsymskij	1977 EZ	Okhotsymskij	March 13, 1977	Nauchnij	N. S. Chernykh	PHO	14 km (8.7 mi)	MPC · JPL
8063 Cristinathomas	1977 XP_{2}	Cristinathomas	December 7, 1977	Palomar	S. J. Bus	KOR	5.3 km (3.3 mi)	MPC · JPL
8064 Lisitsa	1978 RR	Lisitsa	September 1, 1978	Nauchnij	N. S. Chernykh	DOR · slow	15 km (9.3 mi)	MPC · JPL
8065 Nakhodkin	1979 FD_{3}	Nakhodkin	March 31, 1979	Nauchnij	N. S. Chernykh	·	3.4 km (2.1 mi)	MPC · JPL
8066 Poldimeri	1980 PB_{2}	Poldimeri	August 6, 1980	La Silla	R. M. West	·	20 km (12 mi)	MPC · JPL
8067 Helfenstein	1980 RU	Helfenstein	September 7, 1980	Anderson Mesa	E. Bowell	MAR	23 km (14 mi)	MPC · JPL
8068 Vishnureddy	1981 EQ_{28}	Vishnureddy	March 6, 1981	Siding Spring	S. J. Bus	slow	5.2 km (3.2 mi)	MPC · JPL
8069 Benweiss	1981 EF_{30}	Benweiss	March 2, 1981	Siding Spring	S. J. Bus	·	5.8 km (3.6 mi)	MPC · JPL
8070 DeMeo	1981 EM_{30}	DeMeo	March 2, 1981	Siding Spring	S. J. Bus	·	8.1 km (5.0 mi)	MPC · JPL
8071 Simonelli	1981 GO	Simonelli	April 5, 1981	Anderson Mesa	E. Bowell	·	8.1 km (5.0 mi)	MPC · JPL
8072 Yojikondo	1981 GO_{1}	Yojikondo	April 1, 1981	Harvard Observatory	Harvard Observatory	NYS	3.6 km (2.2 mi)	MPC · JPL
8073 Johnharmon	1982 BS	Johnharmon	January 24, 1982	Anderson Mesa	E. Bowell	EUN	6.5 km (4.0 mi)	MPC · JPL
8074 Slade	1984 WC_{2}	Slade	November 20, 1984	Palomar	E. Bowell	GEF	4.6 km (2.9 mi)	MPC · JPL
8075 Roero	1985 PE	Roero	August 14, 1985	Anderson Mesa	E. Bowell	·	13 km (8.1 mi)	MPC · JPL
8076 Foscarini	1985 RV_{4}	Foscarini	September 15, 1985	La Silla	H. Debehogne	THM	13 km (8.1 mi)	MPC · JPL
8077 Hoyle	1986 AW_{2}	Hoyle	January 12, 1986	Anderson Mesa	E. Bowell	moon	10 km (6.2 mi)	MPC · JPL
8078 Carolejordan	1986 RS_{2}	Carolejordan	September 6, 1986	Anderson Mesa	E. Bowell	·	3.4 km (2.1 mi)	MPC · JPL
8079 Bernardlovell	1986 XF_{1}	Bernardlovell	December 4, 1986	Anderson Mesa	E. Bowell	·	4.5 km (2.8 mi)	MPC · JPL
8080 Intel	1987 WU_{2}	Intel	November 17, 1987	Caussols	CERGA	·	7.8 km (4.8 mi)	MPC · JPL
8081 Leopardi	1988 DD	Leopardi	February 17, 1988	Bologna	San Vittore	PHO	8.4 km (5.2 mi)	MPC · JPL
8082 Haynes	1988 NR	Haynes	July 12, 1988	Palomar	E. F. Helin	MAR	8.2 km (5.1 mi)	MPC · JPL
8083 Mayeda	1988 VB	Mayeda	November 1, 1988	Geisei	T. Seki	DOR	12 km (7.5 mi)	MPC · JPL
8084 Dallas	1989 CL_{1}	Dallas	February 6, 1989	Ayashi Station	M. Koishikawa	·	13 km (8.1 mi)	MPC · JPL
8085	1989 CD_{8}	—	February 7, 1989	La Silla	H. Debehogne	EOS	12 km (7.5 mi)	MPC · JPL
8086 Peterthomas	1989 RB_{6}	Peterthomas	September 1, 1989	Palomar	E. Bowell	T_{j} (2.98) · 3:2	26 km (16 mi)	MPC · JPL
8087 Kazutaka	1989 WA_{2}	Kazutaka	November 29, 1989	Kitami	K. Endate, K. Watanabe	·	11 km (6.8 mi)	MPC · JPL
8088 Australia	1990 SL_{27}	Australia	September 23, 1990	Nauchnij	G. R. Kastelʹ, L. V. Zhuravleva	·	4.1 km (2.5 mi)	MPC · JPL
8089 Yukar	1990 TW_{7}	Yukar	October 13, 1990	Tautenburg Observatory	L. D. Schmadel, F. Börngen	·	5.7 km (3.5 mi)	MPC · JPL
8090	1991 RO_{23}	—	September 15, 1991	Palomar	H. E. Holt	·	14 km (8.7 mi)	MPC · JPL
8091	1992 BG	—	January 24, 1992	Oohira	T. Urata	·	9.4 km (5.8 mi)	MPC · JPL
8092	1992 DC_{10}	—	February 29, 1992	La Silla	UESAC	·	5.3 km (3.3 mi)	MPC · JPL
8093	1992 UZ_{2}	—	October 25, 1992	Uenohara	N. Kawasato	KOR	6.5 km (4.0 mi)	MPC · JPL
8094	1992 UG_{3}	—	October 24, 1992	Dynic	A. Sugie	KOR	6.4 km (4.0 mi)	MPC · JPL
8095	1992 WS_{2}	—	November 18, 1992	Kushiro	S. Ueda, H. Kaneda	THM	15 km (9.3 mi)	MPC · JPL
8096 Émilezola	1993 OW_{3}	Émilezola	July 20, 1993	La Silla	E. W. Elst	NYS	4.9 km (3.0 mi)	MPC · JPL
8097 Yamanishi	1993 RE	Yamanishi	September 12, 1993	Kitami	K. Endate, K. Watanabe	NYS	6.2 km (3.9 mi)	MPC · JPL
8098 Miyamotoatsushi	1993 SH_{2}	Miyamotoatsushi	September 19, 1993	Kitami	K. Endate, K. Watanabe	·	6.9 km (4.3 mi)	MPC · JPL
8099 Okudoiyoshimi	1993 TE	Okudoiyoshimi	October 8, 1993	Yatsuka	H. Abe, S. Miyasaka	·	4.1 km (2.5 mi)	MPC · JPL
8100 Nobeyama	1993 XF	Nobeyama	December 4, 1993	Nyukasa	M. Hirasawa, S. Suzuki	·	6.7 km (4.2 mi)	MPC · JPL

== 8101–8200 ==
back to top

Designation			Discovery			Properties		Ref
Permanent	Provisional	Named after	Date	Site	Discoverer(s)	Category	Diam.	Ref
8101 Yasue	1993 XK_{1}	Yasue	December 15, 1993	Oizumi	T. Kobayashi	KOR	5.0 km (3.1 mi)	MPC · JPL
8102 Yoshikazu	1994 AQ_{2}	Yoshikazu	January 14, 1994	Oizumi	T. Kobayashi	KOR	5.4 km (3.4 mi)	MPC · JPL
8103 Fermi	1994 BE	Fermi	January 19, 1994	Farra d'Isonzo	Farra d'Isonzo	·	9.3 km (5.8 mi)	MPC · JPL
8104 Kumamori	1994 BW_{4}	Kumamori	January 19, 1994	Oizumi	T. Kobayashi	EOS	8.9 km (5.5 mi)	MPC · JPL
8105	1994 WH_{2}	—	November 28, 1994	Kushiro	S. Ueda, H. Kaneda	·	4.2 km (2.6 mi)	MPC · JPL
8106 Carpino	1994 YB	Carpino	December 23, 1994	Sormano	M. Cavagna, P. Sicoli	·	12 km (7.5 mi)	MPC · JPL
8107	1995 BR_{4}	—	January 31, 1995	Nachi-Katsuura	Y. Shimizu, T. Urata	·	4.6 km (2.9 mi)	MPC · JPL
8108 Wieland	1995 BC_{16}	Wieland	January 30, 1995	Tautenburg Observatory	F. Börngen	V	4.5 km (2.8 mi)	MPC · JPL
8109 Danielwilliam	1995 DU_{1}	Danielwilliam	February 25, 1995	Catalina Station	C. W. Hergenrother	PHO · slow	4.5 km (2.8 mi)	MPC · JPL
8110 Heath	1995 DE_{2}	Heath	February 27, 1995	Oizumi	T. Kobayashi	·	5.9 km (3.7 mi)	MPC · JPL
8111 Hoepli	1995 GE	Hoepli	April 2, 1995	Sormano	A. Testa, Giuliani, V.	EUN	5.6 km (3.5 mi)	MPC · JPL
8112 Cesi	1995 JJ	Cesi	May 3, 1995	Stroncone	Santa Lucia	·	8.5 km (5.3 mi)	MPC · JPL
8113 Matsue	1996 HD_{1}	Matsue	April 21, 1996	Yatsuka	R. H. McNaught, H. Abe	·	3.2 km (2.0 mi)	MPC · JPL
8114 Lafcadio	1996 HZ_{1}	Lafcadio	April 24, 1996	Yatsuka	H. Abe	·	2.4 km (1.5 mi)	MPC · JPL
8115 Sakabe	1996 HB_{2}	Sakabe	April 24, 1996	Moriyama	R. H. McNaught, Ikari, Y.	·	3.7 km (2.3 mi)	MPC · JPL
8116 Jeanperrin	1996 HA_{15}	Jeanperrin	April 17, 1996	La Silla	E. W. Elst	moon	4.8 km (3.0 mi)	MPC · JPL
8117 Yuanlongping	1996 SD_{1}	Yuanlongping	September 18, 1996	Xinglong	SCAP	EOS	10 km (6.2 mi)	MPC · JPL
8118	1996 WG_{3}	—	November 26, 1996	Xinglong	SCAP	EUN	6.8 km (4.2 mi)	MPC · JPL
8119	1997 TP_{25}	—	October 12, 1997	Xinglong	SCAP	·	5.0 km (3.1 mi)	MPC · JPL
8120 Kobe	1997 VT	Kobe	November 2, 1997	Yatsuka	H. Abe	·	3.1 km (1.9 mi)	MPC · JPL
8121 Altdorfer	2572 P-L	Altdorfer	September 24, 1960	Palomar	C. J. van Houten, I. van Houten-Groeneveld, T. Gehrels	·	2.5 km (1.6 mi)	MPC · JPL
8122 Holbein	4038 P-L	Holbein	September 24, 1960	Palomar	C. J. van Houten, I. van Houten-Groeneveld, T. Gehrels	NYS	3.5 km (2.2 mi)	MPC · JPL
8123 Canaletto	3138 T-1	Canaletto	March 26, 1971	Palomar	C. J. van Houten, I. van Houten-Groeneveld, T. Gehrels	·	3.0 km (1.9 mi)	MPC · JPL
8124 Guardi	4370 T-1	Guardi	March 26, 1971	Palomar	C. J. van Houten, I. van Houten-Groeneveld, T. Gehrels	·	3.8 km (2.4 mi)	MPC · JPL
8125 Tyndareus	5493 T-2	Tyndareus	September 30, 1973	Palomar	C. J. van Houten, I. van Houten-Groeneveld, T. Gehrels	L4	27 km (17 mi)	MPC · JPL
8126 Chanwainam	1966 BL	Chanwainam	January 20, 1966	Nanking	Purple Mountain	DOR	14 km (8.7 mi)	MPC · JPL
8127 Beuf	1967 HA	Beuf	April 27, 1967	El Leoncito	C. U. Cesco	·	7.0 km (4.3 mi)	MPC · JPL
8128 Nicomachus	1967 JP	Nicomachus	May 6, 1967	El Leoncito	C. U. Cesco, A. R. Klemola	HYG	16 km (9.9 mi)	MPC · JPL
8129 Michaelbusch	1975 SK_{1}	Michaelbusch	September 30, 1975	Palomar	S. J. Bus	·	4.1 km (2.5 mi)	MPC · JPL
8130 Seeberg	1976 DJ_{1}	Seeberg	February 27, 1976	Tautenburg Observatory	F. Börngen	3:2	24 km (15 mi)	MPC · JPL
8131 Scanlon	1976 SC	Scanlon	September 27, 1976	Palomar	E. F. Helin	RAF	6.4 km (4.0 mi)	MPC · JPL
8132 Vitginzburg	1976 YA_{6}	Vitginzburg	December 18, 1976	Nauchnij	L. I. Chernykh	EUN	10 km (6.2 mi)	MPC · JPL
8133 Takanochoei	1977 DX_{3}	Takanochoei	February 18, 1977	Kiso	H. Kosai, K. Furukawa	THM	14 km (8.7 mi)	MPC · JPL
8134 Minin	1978 SQ_{7}	Minin	September 26, 1978	Nauchnij	L. V. Zhuravleva	·	4.0 km (2.5 mi)	MPC · JPL
8135 Davidmitchell	1978 VP_{10}	Davidmitchell	November 7, 1978	Palomar	E. F. Helin, S. J. Bus	·	4.9 km (3.0 mi)	MPC · JPL
8136 Landis	1979 MH_{2}	Landis	June 25, 1979	Siding Spring	E. F. Helin, S. J. Bus	·	8.6 km (5.3 mi)	MPC · JPL
8137 Kvíz	1979 SJ	Kvíz	September 19, 1979	Kleť	Kleť	·	3.9 km (2.4 mi)	MPC · JPL
8138 Craigbowers	1980 FF_{12}	Craigbowers	March 20, 1980	Bickley	Perth Observatory	·	3.3 km (2.1 mi)	MPC · JPL
8139 Paulabell	1980 UM_{1}	Paulabell	October 31, 1980	Palomar	S. J. Bus	·	2.9 km (1.8 mi)	MPC · JPL
8140 Hardersen	1981 EO_{15}	Hardersen	March 1, 1981	Siding Spring	S. J. Bus	·	8.2 km (5.1 mi)	MPC · JPL
8141 Nikolaev	1982 SO_{4}	Nikolaev	September 20, 1982	Nauchnij	N. S. Chernykh	slow	4.4 km (2.7 mi)	MPC · JPL
8142 Zolotov	1982 UR_{6}	Zolotov	October 20, 1982	Nauchnij	L. G. Karachkina	NYS	4.0 km (2.5 mi)	MPC · JPL
8143 Nezval	1982 VN	Nezval	November 11, 1982	Kleť	A. Mrkos	·	3.8 km (2.4 mi)	MPC · JPL
8144 Hiragagennai	1982 VY_{2}	Hiragagennai	November 14, 1982	Kiso	H. Kosai, K. Furukawa	KOR	6.6 km (4.1 mi)	MPC · JPL
8145 Valujki	1983 RY_{4}	Valujki	September 5, 1983	Nauchnij	L. V. Zhuravleva	·	7.0 km (4.3 mi)	MPC · JPL
8146 Jimbell	1983 WG	Jimbell	November 28, 1983	Anderson Mesa	E. Bowell	·	19 km (12 mi)	MPC · JPL
8147 Colemanhawkins	1984 SU_{3}	Colemanhawkins	September 28, 1984	Anderson Mesa	B. A. Skiff	·	8.8 km (5.5 mi)	MPC · JPL
8148 Golding	1985 CR_{2}	Golding	February 15, 1985	La Silla	H. Debehogne	·	3.8 km (2.4 mi)	MPC · JPL
8149 Ruff	1985 JN_{1}	Ruff	May 11, 1985	Palomar	C. S. Shoemaker, E. M. Shoemaker	·	4.1 km (2.5 mi)	MPC · JPL
8150 Kaluga	1985 QL_{4}	Kaluga	August 24, 1985	Nauchnij	N. S. Chernykh	HYG	13 km (8.1 mi)	MPC · JPL
8151 Andranada	1986 PK_{6}	Andranada	August 12, 1986	Nauchnij	L. V. Zhuravleva	·	5.4 km (3.4 mi)	MPC · JPL
8152 Martinlee	1986 VY	Martinlee	November 3, 1986	Kleť	A. Mrkos	·	7.9 km (4.9 mi)	MPC · JPL
8153 Gattacceca	1986 WO_{1}	Gattacceca	November 25, 1986	Kleť	A. Mrkos	NYS	4.9 km (3.0 mi)	MPC · JPL
8154 Stahl	1988 CQ_{7}	Stahl	February 15, 1988	La Silla	E. W. Elst	·	2.8 km (1.7 mi)	MPC · JPL
8155 Battaglini	1988 QA	Battaglini	August 17, 1988	Bologna	San Vittore	·	9.6 km (6.0 mi)	MPC · JPL
8156 Tsukada	1988 TR	Tsukada	October 13, 1988	Kitami	K. Endate, K. Watanabe	·	6.0 km (3.7 mi)	MPC · JPL
8157	1988 XG_{2}	—	December 15, 1988	Gekko	Y. Oshima	DOR	12 km (7.5 mi)	MPC · JPL
8158 Herder	1989 UH_{7}	Herder	October 23, 1989	Tautenburg Observatory	F. Börngen	·	5.1 km (3.2 mi)	MPC · JPL
8159 Fukuoka	1990 BE_{1}	Fukuoka	January 24, 1990	Kitami	K. Endate, K. Watanabe	·	6.8 km (4.2 mi)	MPC · JPL
8160 Petererwin	1990 MG	Petererwin	June 21, 1990	Palomar	H. E. Holt	·	4.1 km (2.5 mi)	MPC · JPL
8161 Newman	1990 QP_{3}	Newman	August 19, 1990	Harvard Observatory	Oak Ridge Observatory	THM	11 km (6.8 mi)	MPC · JPL
8162	1990 SK_{11}	—	September 16, 1990	Palomar	H. E. Holt	·	4.4 km (2.7 mi)	MPC · JPL
8163 Ishizaki	1990 UF_{2}	Ishizaki	October 27, 1990	Geisei	T. Seki	·	5.0 km (3.1 mi)	MPC · JPL
8164 Andreasdoppler	1990 UO_{3}	Andreasdoppler	October 16, 1990	La Silla	E. W. Elst	·	3.7 km (2.3 mi)	MPC · JPL
8165 Gnädig	1990 WQ_{3}	Gnädig	November 21, 1990	La Silla	E. W. Elst	·	5.0 km (3.1 mi)	MPC · JPL
8166 Buczynski	1991 AH_{1}	Buczynski	January 12, 1991	Stakenbridge	B. G. W. Manning	NYS	3.7 km (2.3 mi)	MPC · JPL
8167 Ishii	1991 CM_{3}	Ishii	February 14, 1991	Kitami	K. Endate, K. Watanabe	·	5.5 km (3.4 mi)	MPC · JPL
8168 Rogerbourke	1991 FK_{1}	Rogerbourke	March 18, 1991	Palomar	E. F. Helin	·	4.3 km (2.7 mi)	MPC · JPL
8169 Mirabeau	1991 PO_{2}	Mirabeau	August 2, 1991	La Silla	E. W. Elst	·	11 km (6.8 mi)	MPC · JPL
8170	1991 PZ_{11}	—	August 7, 1991	Palomar	H. E. Holt	EUN	6.9 km (4.3 mi)	MPC · JPL
8171 Stauffenberg	1991 RV_{3}	Stauffenberg	September 5, 1991	Tautenburg Observatory	F. Börngen, L. D. Schmadel	EOS	8.8 km (5.5 mi)	MPC · JPL
8172	1991 RP_{15}	—	September 15, 1991	Palomar	H. E. Holt	·	13 km (8.1 mi)	MPC · JPL
8173	1991 RX_{23}	—	September 11, 1991	Palomar	H. E. Holt	slow	8.1 km (5.0 mi)	MPC · JPL
8174	1991 SL_{2}	—	September 17, 1991	Palomar	H. E. Holt	·	23 km (14 mi)	MPC · JPL
8175 Boerhaave	1991 VV_{5}	Boerhaave	November 2, 1991	La Silla	E. W. Elst	EOS	9.8 km (6.1 mi)	MPC · JPL
8176	1991 WA	—	November 29, 1991	Siding Spring	R. H. McNaught	APO +1 km (0.62 mi)	1.4 km (0.87 mi)	MPC · JPL
8177	1992 BO	—	January 28, 1992	Kushiro	S. Ueda, H. Kaneda	·	5.0 km (3.1 mi)	MPC · JPL
8178	1992 DQ_{10}	—	February 29, 1992	La Silla	UESAC	·	3.6 km (2.2 mi)	MPC · JPL
8179	1992 EA_{7}	—	March 1, 1992	La Silla	UESAC	·	4.3 km (2.7 mi)	MPC · JPL
8180	1992 PY_{2}	—	August 6, 1992	Palomar	H. E. Holt	MAR	7.5 km (4.7 mi)	MPC · JPL
8181 Rossini	1992 ST_{26}	Rossini	September 28, 1992	Nauchnij	L. V. Zhuravleva	·	11 km (6.8 mi)	MPC · JPL
8182 Akita	1992 TX	Akita	October 1, 1992	Kitami	M. Yanai, K. Watanabe	KOR	7.1 km (4.4 mi)	MPC · JPL
8183	1992 UE_{3}	—	October 22, 1992	Kushiro	S. Ueda, H. Kaneda	KOR · fast	6.5 km (4.0 mi)	MPC · JPL
8184 Luderic	1992 WL	Luderic	November 16, 1992	Kushiro	S. Ueda, H. Kaneda	EOS	12 km (7.5 mi)	MPC · JPL
8185	1992 WR_{2}	—	November 18, 1992	Kushiro	S. Ueda, H. Kaneda	KOR	6.8 km (4.2 mi)	MPC · JPL
8186	1992 WP_{3}	—	November 17, 1992	Dynic	A. Sugie	EOS	9.9 km (6.2 mi)	MPC · JPL
8187 Akiramisawa	1992 XL	Akiramisawa	December 15, 1992	Kiyosato	S. Otomo	EOS	9.2 km (5.7 mi)	MPC · JPL
8188 Okegaya	1992 YE_{3}	Okegaya	December 18, 1992	Kani	Y. Mizuno, T. Furuta	·	20 km (12 mi)	MPC · JPL
8189 Naruke	1992 YG_{3}	Naruke	December 30, 1992	Okutama	Hioki, T., Hayakawa, S.	THM	16 km (9.9 mi)	MPC · JPL
8190 Bouguer	1993 ON_{9}	Bouguer	July 20, 1993	La Silla	E. W. Elst	·	3.6 km (2.2 mi)	MPC · JPL
8191 Mersenne	1993 OX_{9}	Mersenne	July 20, 1993	La Silla	E. W. Elst	·	2.9 km (1.8 mi)	MPC · JPL
8192 Tonucci	1993 RB	Tonucci	September 10, 1993	Stroncone	Santa Lucia	·	2.4 km (1.5 mi)	MPC · JPL
8193 Ciaurro	1993 SF	Ciaurro	September 17, 1993	Stroncone	Santa Lucia	·	1.8 km (1.1 mi)	MPC · JPL
8194 Satake	1993 SB_{1}	Satake	September 16, 1993	Kitami	K. Endate, K. Watanabe	·	6.7 km (4.2 mi)	MPC · JPL
8195 Tamkin	1993 UC_{1}	Tamkin	October 19, 1993	Palomar	E. F. Helin	PHO	8.1 km (5.0 mi)	MPC · JPL
8196	1993 UB_{3}	—	October 16, 1993	Palomar	E. F. Helin	·	4.6 km (2.9 mi)	MPC · JPL
8197 Mizunohiroshi	1993 VX	Mizunohiroshi	November 15, 1993	Oizumi	T. Kobayashi	·	10 km (6.2 mi)	MPC · JPL
8198	1993 VE_{2}	—	November 11, 1993	Kushiro	S. Ueda, H. Kaneda	·	6.1 km (3.8 mi)	MPC · JPL
8199 Takagitakeo	1993 XR	Takagitakeo	December 9, 1993	Oizumi	T. Kobayashi	ADE	9.0 km (5.6 mi)	MPC · JPL
8200 Souten	1994 AY_{1}	Souten	January 7, 1994	Nyukasa	M. Hirasawa, S. Suzuki	·	7.6 km (4.7 mi)	MPC · JPL

== 8201–8300 ==
back to top

Designation			Discovery			Properties		Ref
Permanent	Provisional	Named after	Date	Site	Discoverer(s)	Category	Diam.	Ref
8201	1994 AH_{2}	—	January 5, 1994	Siding Spring	G. J. Garradd	APO +1 km (0.62 mi) · (887)	1.9 km (1.2 mi)	MPC · JPL
8202 Gooley	1994 CX_{2}	Gooley	February 11, 1994	Kitami	K. Endate, K. Watanabe	·	6.5 km (4.0 mi)	MPC · JPL
8203 Jogolehmann	1994 CP_{10}	Jogolehmann	February 7, 1994	La Silla	E. W. Elst	HYG	14 km (8.7 mi)	MPC · JPL
8204 Takabatake	1994 GC_{1}	Takabatake	April 8, 1994	Kitami	K. Endate, K. Watanabe	THM	14 km (8.7 mi)	MPC · JPL
8205 Van Dijck	1994 PE_{10}	Van Dijck	August 10, 1994	La Silla	E. W. Elst	THM	10 km (6.2 mi)	MPC · JPL
8206 Masayuki	1994 WK_{1}	Masayuki	November 27, 1994	Oizumi	T. Kobayashi	·	3.5 km (2.2 mi)	MPC · JPL
8207 Suminao	1994 YS_{1}	Suminao	December 31, 1994	Oizumi	T. Kobayashi	·	2.8 km (1.7 mi)	MPC · JPL
8208 Volta	1995 DL_{2}	Volta	February 28, 1995	Sormano	P. Sicoli, Ghezzi, P.	·	9.3 km (5.8 mi)	MPC · JPL
8209 Toscanelli	1995 DM_{2}	Toscanelli	February 28, 1995	Sormano	P. Sicoli, Ghezzi, P.	·	8.1 km (5.0 mi)	MPC · JPL
8210 NANTEN	1995 EH	NANTEN	March 5, 1995	Oizumi	T. Kobayashi	·	5.5 km (3.4 mi)	MPC · JPL
8211	1995 EB_{1}	—	March 5, 1995	Kushiro	S. Ueda, H. Kaneda	NYS	4.8 km (3.0 mi)	MPC · JPL
8212 Naoshigetani	1995 EF_{1}	Naoshigetani	March 6, 1995	Kiyosato	S. Otomo	NYS ·	4.5 km (2.8 mi)	MPC · JPL
8213	1995 FE	—	March 26, 1995	Nachi-Katsuura	Y. Shimizu, T. Urata	PHO	4.6 km (2.9 mi)	MPC · JPL
8214 Mirellalilli	1995 FH	Mirellalilli	March 29, 1995	La Silla	Mottola, S.	·	9.3 km (5.8 mi)	MPC · JPL
8215 Zanonato	1995 FZ	Zanonato	March 31, 1995	Nachi-Katsuura	Y. Shimizu, T. Urata	·	3.6 km (2.2 mi)	MPC · JPL
8216 Melosh	1995 FX_{14}	Melosh	March 27, 1995	Kitt Peak	Spacewatch	(5)	3.4 km (2.1 mi)	MPC · JPL
8217 Dominikhašek	1995 HC	Dominikhašek	April 21, 1995	Ondřejov	P. Pravec, L. Kotková	·	2.9 km (1.8 mi)	MPC · JPL
8218 Hosty	1996 JH	Hosty	May 8, 1996	Siding Spring	R. H. McNaught	·	2.2 km (1.4 mi)	MPC · JPL
8219	1996 JL	—	May 10, 1996	Chiyoda	R. H. McNaught, T. Kojima	GEF	8.1 km (5.0 mi)	MPC · JPL
8220 Nanyou	1996 JD_{1}	Nanyou	May 13, 1996	Nanyo	T. Okuni	·	2.6 km (1.6 mi)	MPC · JPL
8221 La Condamine	1996 NA_{4}	La Condamine	July 14, 1996	La Silla	E. W. Elst	KOR	6.1 km (3.8 mi)	MPC · JPL
8222 Gellner	1996 OX	Gellner	July 22, 1996	Kleť	M. Tichý, Z. Moravec	·	3.4 km (2.1 mi)	MPC · JPL
8223 Bradshaw	1996 PD	Bradshaw	August 6, 1996	Prescott	P. G. Comba	·	9.2 km (5.7 mi)	MPC · JPL
8224 Fultonwright	1996 PE	Fultonwright	August 6, 1996	Prescott	P. G. Comba	·	5.3 km (3.3 mi)	MPC · JPL
8225 Emerson	1996 QC	Emerson	August 16, 1996	Portimão	Durman, C. F., Ewen-Smith, B. M.	·	7.1 km (4.4 mi)	MPC · JPL
8226	1996 TF_{7}	—	October 5, 1996	Nachi-Katsuura	Y. Shimizu, T. Urata	EOS	12 km (7.5 mi)	MPC · JPL
8227	1996 VD_{4}	—	November 8, 1996	Xinglong	SCAP	THM	12 km (7.5 mi)	MPC · JPL
8228	1996 YB_{2}	—	December 22, 1996	Xinglong	SCAP	·	8.3 km (5.2 mi)	MPC · JPL
8229 Kozelský	1996 YU_{2}	Kozelský	December 28, 1996	Ondřejov	M. Wolf, L. Kotková	·	13 km (8.1 mi)	MPC · JPL
8230 Perona	1997 TW_{16}	Perona	October 8, 1997	Stroncone	Santa Lucia	·	2.7 km (1.7 mi)	MPC · JPL
8231 Tetsujiyamada	1997 TX_{17}	Tetsujiyamada	October 6, 1997	Kitami	K. Endate, K. Watanabe	KOR	7.3 km (4.5 mi)	MPC · JPL
8232 Akiramizuno	1997 UW_{3}	Akiramizuno	October 26, 1997	Oizumi	T. Kobayashi	·	5.3 km (3.3 mi)	MPC · JPL
8233 Asada	1997 VZ_{2}	Asada	November 5, 1997	Oizumi	T. Kobayashi	·	10 km (6.2 mi)	MPC · JPL
8234 Nobeoka	1997 VK_{8}	Nobeoka	November 3, 1997	Geisei	T. Seki	KOR	8.1 km (5.0 mi)	MPC · JPL
8235 Fragonard	2096 P-L	Fragonard	September 24, 1960	Palomar	C. J. van Houten, I. van Houten-Groeneveld, T. Gehrels	CLA ·	6.5 km (4.0 mi)	MPC · JPL
8236 Gainsborough	4040 P-L	Gainsborough	September 24, 1960	Palomar	C. J. van Houten, I. van Houten-Groeneveld, T. Gehrels	DOR	6.1 km (3.8 mi)	MPC · JPL
8237 Constable	7581 P-L	Constable	October 17, 1960	Palomar	C. J. van Houten, I. van Houten-Groeneveld, T. Gehrels	·	3.9 km (2.4 mi)	MPC · JPL
8238 Courbet	4232 T-1	Courbet	March 26, 1971	Palomar	C. J. van Houten, I. van Houten-Groeneveld, T. Gehrels	DOR	8.6 km (5.3 mi)	MPC · JPL
8239 Signac	1153 T-2	Signac	September 29, 1973	Palomar	C. J. van Houten, I. van Houten-Groeneveld, T. Gehrels	THM	10 km (6.2 mi)	MPC · JPL
8240 Matisse	4172 T-2	Matisse	September 29, 1973	Palomar	C. J. van Houten, I. van Houten-Groeneveld, T. Gehrels	·	4.2 km (2.6 mi)	MPC · JPL
8241 Agrius	1973 SE_{1}	Agrius	September 19, 1973	Palomar	C. J. van Houten, I. van Houten-Groeneveld, T. Gehrels	L4	27 km (17 mi)	MPC · JPL
8242 Joshemery	1975 SA_{1}	Joshemery	September 30, 1975	Palomar	S. J. Bus	EOS	8.8 km (5.5 mi)	MPC · JPL
8243 Devonburr	1975 SF_{1}	Devonburr	September 30, 1975	Palomar	S. J. Bus	·	5.7 km (3.5 mi)	MPC · JPL
8244 Mikolaichuk	1975 TO_{2}	Mikolaichuk	October 3, 1975	Nauchnij	L. I. Chernykh	·	3.6 km (2.2 mi)	MPC · JPL
8245 Molnar	1977 RC_{9}	Molnar	September 8, 1977	Palomar	S. J. Bus	NYS	3.6 km (2.2 mi)	MPC · JPL
8246 Kotov	1979 QT_{8}	Kotov	August 20, 1979	Nauchnij	N. S. Chernykh	·	3.4 km (2.1 mi)	MPC · JPL
8247 Cherylhall	1979 SP_{14}	Cherylhall	September 20, 1979	Palomar	S. J. Bus	·	15 km (9.3 mi)	MPC · JPL
8248 Gurzuf	1979 TV_{2}	Gurzuf	October 14, 1979	Nauchnij	N. S. Chernykh	·	3.4 km (2.1 mi)	MPC · JPL
8249 Gershwin	1980 GG	Gershwin	April 13, 1980	Kleť	A. Mrkos	·	7.1 km (4.4 mi)	MPC · JPL
8250 Cornell	1980 RP	Cornell	September 2, 1980	Anderson Mesa	E. Bowell	TIR	9.0 km (5.6 mi)	MPC · JPL
8251 Isogai	1980 VA	Isogai	November 8, 1980	Tōkai	T. Furuta	·	4.3 km (2.7 mi)	MPC · JPL
8252 Elkins-Tanton	1981 EY_{14}	Elkins-Tanton	March 1, 1981	Siding Spring	S. J. Bus	·	3.1 km (1.9 mi)	MPC · JPL
8253 Brunetto	1981 EU_{15}	Brunetto	March 1, 1981	Siding Spring	S. J. Bus	·	2.4 km (1.5 mi)	MPC · JPL
8254 Moskovitz	1981 EF_{18}	Moskovitz	March 2, 1981	Siding Spring	S. J. Bus	·	2.5 km (1.6 mi)	MPC · JPL
8255 Masiero	1981 EZ_{18}	Masiero	March 2, 1981	Siding Spring	S. J. Bus	·	6.9 km (4.3 mi)	MPC · JPL
8256 Shenzhou	1981 UZ_{9}	Shenzhou	October 25, 1981	Nanking	Purple Mountain	·	4.8 km (3.0 mi)	MPC · JPL
8257 Andycheng	1982 HO_{1}	Andycheng	April 28, 1982	Anderson Mesa	E. Bowell	·	4.2 km (2.6 mi)	MPC · JPL
8258 McCracken	1982 RW_{1}	McCracken	September 15, 1982	Kleť	A. Mrkos	·	3.4 km (2.1 mi)	MPC · JPL
8259	1983 UG	—	October 16, 1983	Kleť	Z. Vávrová	·	4.8 km (3.0 mi)	MPC · JPL
8260 Momcheva	1984 SH	Momcheva	September 23, 1984	Smolyan	Bulgarian National Observatory	·	3.9 km (2.4 mi)	MPC · JPL
8261 Ceciliejulie	1985 RD	Ceciliejulie	September 11, 1985	Brorfelde	Copenhagen Observatory	·	11 km (6.8 mi)	MPC · JPL
8262 Carcich	1985 RG	Carcich	September 14, 1985	Anderson Mesa	E. Bowell	·	4.7 km (2.9 mi)	MPC · JPL
8263	1986 QT	—	August 26, 1986	La Silla	H. Debehogne	·	3.9 km (2.4 mi)	MPC · JPL
8264	1986 QA_{3}	—	August 29, 1986	La Silla	H. Debehogne	·	3.8 km (2.4 mi)	MPC · JPL
8265	1986 RB_{5}	—	September 1, 1986	La Silla	H. Debehogne	·	5.7 km (3.5 mi)	MPC · JPL
8266 Bertelli	1986 TC	Bertelli	October 1, 1986	Bologna	San Vittore	·	4.0 km (2.5 mi)	MPC · JPL
8267 Kiss	1986 TX_{3}	Kiss	October 4, 1986	Kleť	A. Mrkos	·	3.8 km (2.4 mi)	MPC · JPL
8268 Goerdeler	1987 SQ_{10}	Goerdeler	September 29, 1987	Tautenburg Observatory	F. Börngen	·	7.8 km (4.8 mi)	MPC · JPL
8269 Calandrelli	1988 QB	Calandrelli	August 17, 1988	Bologna	San Vittore	·	5.7 km (3.5 mi)	MPC · JPL
8270 Winslow	1989 JF	Winslow	May 2, 1989	Palomar	E. F. Helin	·	3.9 km (2.4 mi)	MPC · JPL
8271 Imai	1989 NY	Imai	July 2, 1989	Palomar	E. F. Helin	·	5.8 km (3.6 mi)	MPC · JPL
8272 Iitatemura	1989 SG	Iitatemura	September 24, 1989	Kani	Y. Mizuno, T. Furuta	·	7.2 km (4.5 mi)	MPC · JPL
8273 Apatheia	1989 WB_{2}	Apatheia	November 29, 1989	Susono	M. Akiyama, T. Furuta	(5)	4.8 km (3.0 mi)	MPC · JPL
8274 Soejima	1990 TJ_{1}	Soejima	October 15, 1990	Kitami	K. Endate, K. Watanabe	·	3.4 km (2.1 mi)	MPC · JPL
8275 Inca	1990 VR_{8}	Inca	November 11, 1990	La Silla	E. W. Elst	slow	2.9 km (1.8 mi)	MPC · JPL
8276 Shigei	1991 FL	Shigei	March 17, 1991	Kiyosato	S. Otomo, O. Muramatsu	NYS	4.6 km (2.9 mi)	MPC · JPL
8277 Machu-Picchu	1991 GV_{8}	Machu-Picchu	April 8, 1991	La Silla	E. W. Elst	·	7.0 km (4.3 mi)	MPC · JPL
8278 Ooyanagi	1991 JJ	Ooyanagi	May 4, 1991	Kani	Y. Mizuno, T. Furuta	EUN	9.6 km (6.0 mi)	MPC · JPL
8279 Cuzco	1991 PN_{7}	Cuzco	August 6, 1991	La Silla	E. W. Elst	KOR	5.5 km (3.4 mi)	MPC · JPL
8280 Petergruber	1991 PG_{16}	Petergruber	August 7, 1991	Palomar	H. E. Holt	·	9.4 km (5.8 mi)	MPC · JPL
8281	1991 PC_{18}	—	August 8, 1991	Palomar	H. E. Holt	·	13 km (8.1 mi)	MPC · JPL
8282 Delp	1991 RR_{40}	Delp	September 10, 1991	Tautenburg Observatory	F. Börngen	THM	11 km (6.8 mi)	MPC · JPL
8283 Edinburgh	1991 SV	Edinburgh	September 30, 1991	Siding Spring	R. H. McNaught	·	8.0 km (5.0 mi)	MPC · JPL
8284 Cranach	1991 TT_{13}	Cranach	October 8, 1991	Tautenburg Observatory	F. Börngen	·	20 km (12 mi)	MPC · JPL
8285	1991 UK_{3}	—	October 31, 1991	Kushiro	S. Ueda, H. Kaneda	·	8.5 km (5.3 mi)	MPC · JPL
8286 Kouji	1992 EK_{1}	Kouji	March 8, 1992	Kitami	K. Endate, K. Watanabe	·	4.3 km (2.7 mi)	MPC · JPL
8287	1992 EJ_{4}	—	March 1, 1992	La Silla	UESAC	·	3.6 km (2.2 mi)	MPC · JPL
8288	1992 ED_{17}	—	March 1, 1992	La Silla	UESAC	·	3.1 km (1.9 mi)	MPC · JPL
8289 An-Eefje	1992 JQ_{3}	An-Eefje	May 3, 1992	La Silla	H. Debehogne	·	3.8 km (2.4 mi)	MPC · JPL
8290	1992 NP	—	July 2, 1992	Palomar	E. F. Helin, Lee, L.	EUN	7.0 km (4.3 mi)	MPC · JPL
8291 Bingham	1992 RV_{1}	Bingham	September 2, 1992	La Silla	E. W. Elst	(5)	5.2 km (3.2 mi)	MPC · JPL
8292	1992 SU_{14}	—	September 30, 1992	Palomar	H. E. Holt	·	12 km (7.5 mi)	MPC · JPL
8293	1992 UQ	—	October 19, 1992	Kushiro	S. Ueda, H. Kaneda	·	6.4 km (4.0 mi)	MPC · JPL
8294 Takayuki	1992 UM_{3}	Takayuki	October 26, 1992	Kitami	K. Endate, K. Watanabe	EOS	15 km (9.3 mi)	MPC · JPL
8295 Toshifukushima	1992 UN_{4}	Toshifukushima	October 26, 1992	Kitami	K. Endate, K. Watanabe	GEF	6.4 km (4.0 mi)	MPC · JPL
8296 Miyama	1993 AD	Miyama	January 13, 1993	Kitami	K. Endate, K. Watanabe	·	10 km (6.2 mi)	MPC · JPL
8297 Gérardfaure	1993 QJ_{4}	Gérardfaure	August 18, 1993	Caussols	E. W. Elst	moon	3.2 km (2.0 mi)	MPC · JPL
8298 Loubna	1993 SQ_{10}	Loubna	September 22, 1993	La Silla	H. Debehogne, E. W. Elst	·	3.1 km (1.9 mi)	MPC · JPL
8299 Téaleoni	1993 TP_{24}	Téaleoni	October 9, 1993	La Silla	E. W. Elst	·	3.0 km (1.9 mi)	MPC · JPL
8300 Iga	1994 AO_{2}	Iga	January 9, 1994	Oizumi	T. Kobayashi	EUN	3.8 km (2.4 mi)	MPC · JPL

== 8301–8400 ==
back to top

Designation			Discovery			Properties		Ref
Permanent	Provisional	Named after	Date	Site	Discoverer(s)	Category	Diam.	Ref
8301 Haseyuji	1995 BG_{2}	Haseyuji	January 30, 1995	Oizumi	T. Kobayashi	·	5.8 km (3.6 mi)	MPC · JPL
8302 Kazukin	1995 CY	Kazukin	February 3, 1995	Oizumi	T. Kobayashi	·	3.0 km (1.9 mi)	MPC · JPL
8303 Miyaji	1995 CO_{1}	Miyaji	February 9, 1995	Oizumi	T. Kobayashi	·	3.5 km (2.2 mi)	MPC · JPL
8304 Ryomichico	1995 DJ_{1}	Ryomichico	February 22, 1995	Oizumi	T. Kobayashi	NYS	4.9 km (3.0 mi)	MPC · JPL
8305 Teika	1995 DQ_{1}	Teika	February 22, 1995	Oizumi	T. Kobayashi	·	4.9 km (3.0 mi)	MPC · JPL
8306 Shoko	1995 DY_{1}	Shoko	February 24, 1995	Kuma Kogen	A. Nakamura	moon	2.7 km (1.7 mi)	MPC · JPL
8307 Peltan	1995 EN	Peltan	March 5, 1995	Kleť	J. Tichá	·	2.4 km (1.5 mi)	MPC · JPL
8308 Julie-Mélissa	1996 HD_{13}	Julie-Mélissa	April 17, 1996	La Silla	E. W. Elst	·	3.0 km (1.9 mi)	MPC · JPL
8309 Jedidahisler	1996 NL_{1}	Jedidahisler	July 14, 1996	Haleakalā	NEAT	·	4.1 km (2.5 mi)	MPC · JPL
8310 Seelos	1996 PL_{2}	Seelos	August 9, 1996	Haleakalā	NEAT	·	3.5 km (2.2 mi)	MPC · JPL
8311 Zhangdaning	1996 TV_{1}	Zhangdaning	October 3, 1996	Xinglong	SCAP	·	2.7 km (1.7 mi)	MPC · JPL
8312	1996 TJ_{12}	—	October 15, 1996	Nachi-Katsuura	Y. Shimizu, T. Urata	EOS	9.2 km (5.7 mi)	MPC · JPL
8313 Christiansen	1996 YU_{1}	Christiansen	December 19, 1996	Xinglong	SCAP	·	5.2 km (3.2 mi)	MPC · JPL
8314 Tsuji	1997 US_{8}	Tsuji	October 25, 1997	Kitami	K. Endate, K. Watanabe	THM	14 km (8.7 mi)	MPC · JPL
8315 Bajin	1997 WA_{22}	Bajin	November 25, 1997	Xinglong	SCAP	slow	6.1 km (3.8 mi)	MPC · JPL
8316 Wolkenstein	3002 P-L	Wolkenstein	September 24, 1960	Palomar	C. J. van Houten, I. van Houten-Groeneveld, T. Gehrels	EOS	16 km (9.9 mi)	MPC · JPL
8317 Eurysaces	4523 P-L	Eurysaces	September 24, 1960	Palomar	C. J. van Houten, I. van Houten-Groeneveld, T. Gehrels	L4	26 km (16 mi)	MPC · JPL
8318 Averroes	1306 T-2	Averroes	September 29, 1973	Palomar	C. J. van Houten, I. van Houten-Groeneveld, T. Gehrels	THM	10 km (6.2 mi)	MPC · JPL
8319 Antiphanes	3365 T-2	Antiphanes	September 25, 1973	Palomar	C. J. van Houten, I. van Houten-Groeneveld, T. Gehrels	THM	10 km (6.2 mi)	MPC · JPL
8320 van Zee	1955 RV	van Zee	September 13, 1955	Brooklyn	Indiana University	NYS	5.5 km (3.4 mi)	MPC · JPL
8321 Akim	1977 EX	Akim	March 13, 1977	Nauchnij	N. S. Chernykh	EUN	11 km (6.8 mi)	MPC · JPL
8322 Kononovich	1978 RL_{1}	Kononovich	September 5, 1978	Nauchnij	N. S. Chernykh	THM	12 km (7.5 mi)	MPC · JPL
8323 Krimigis	1979 UH	Krimigis	October 17, 1979	Anderson Mesa	E. Bowell	·	12 km (7.5 mi)	MPC · JPL
8324 Juliadeleón	1981 DF_{2}	Juliadeleón	February 28, 1981	Siding Spring	S. J. Bus	·	3.2 km (2.0 mi)	MPC · JPL
8325 Trigo-Rodriguez	1981 EM_{26}	Trigo-Rodriguez	March 2, 1981	Siding Spring	S. J. Bus	·	11 km (6.8 mi)	MPC · JPL
8326 Paulkling	1981 JS_{2}	Paulkling	May 6, 1981	Palomar	C. S. Shoemaker, E. M. Shoemaker	NYS	4.2 km (2.6 mi)	MPC · JPL
8327 Weihenmayer	1981 JE_{3}	Weihenmayer	May 6, 1981	Palomar	C. S. Shoemaker, E. M. Shoemaker	·	8.8 km (5.5 mi)	MPC · JPL
8328 Uyttenhove	1981 QQ_{2}	Uyttenhove	August 23, 1981	La Silla	H. Debehogne	·	2.9 km (1.8 mi)	MPC · JPL
8329 Speckman	1982 FP_{3}	Speckman	March 22, 1982	La Silla	H. Debehogne	THM ·	14 km (8.7 mi)	MPC · JPL
8330 Fitzroy	1982 FX_{3}	Fitzroy	March 28, 1982	La Silla	H. Debehogne	HYG	13 km (8.1 mi)	MPC · JPL
8331 Dawkins	1982 KK_{1}	Dawkins	May 27, 1982	Palomar	C. S. Shoemaker, S. J. Bus	·	4.8 km (3.0 mi)	MPC · JPL
8332 Ivantsvetaev	1982 TL_{2}	Ivantsvetaev	October 14, 1982	Nauchnij	L. V. Zhuravleva, L. G. Karachkina	·	4.0 km (2.5 mi)	MPC · JPL
8333 Medina	1982 VF	Medina	November 7, 1982	Kleť	A. Mrkos	·	10 km (6.2 mi)	MPC · JPL
8334	1984 CF	—	February 10, 1984	Palomar	Gibson, J.	GEF · slow ·	7.8 km (4.8 mi)	MPC · JPL
8335 Sarton	1984 DD_{1}	Sarton	February 28, 1984	La Silla	H. Debehogne	·	3.7 km (2.3 mi)	MPC · JPL
8336 Šafařík	1984 SK_{1}	Šafařík	September 27, 1984	Kleť	A. Mrkos	·	11 km (6.8 mi)	MPC · JPL
8337	1984 SF_{6}	—	September 22, 1984	La Silla	H. Debehogne	THM	10 km (6.2 mi)	MPC · JPL
8338 Ralhan	1985 FE_{3}	Ralhan	March 27, 1985	Brorfelde	Copenhagen Observatory	·	4.8 km (3.0 mi)	MPC · JPL
8339 Kosovichia	1985 RM_{6}	Kosovichia	September 15, 1985	Nauchnij	N. S. Chernykh	THM	12 km (7.5 mi)	MPC · JPL
8340 Mumma	1985 TS_{1}	Mumma	October 15, 1985	Anderson Mesa	E. Bowell	EOS ·	20 km (12 mi)	MPC · JPL
8341	1986 QQ	—	August 26, 1986	La Silla	H. Debehogne	·	4.2 km (2.6 mi)	MPC · JPL
8342	1986 QN_{3}	—	August 29, 1986	La Silla	H. Debehogne	·	6.4 km (4.0 mi)	MPC · JPL
8343 Tugendhat	1986 TG_{3}	Tugendhat	October 4, 1986	Kleť	A. Mrkos	KOR	6.2 km (3.9 mi)	MPC · JPL
8344 Babette	1987 BB	Babette	January 25, 1987	Ojima	T. Niijima, T. Urata	·	2.7 km (1.7 mi)	MPC · JPL
8345 Ulmerspatz	1987 BO_{1}	Ulmerspatz	January 22, 1987	La Silla	E. W. Elst	PHO	7.2 km (4.5 mi)	MPC · JPL
8346	1987 DW_{6}	—	February 26, 1987	La Silla	H. Debehogne	THM	13 km (8.1 mi)	MPC · JPL
8347 Lallaward	1987 HK	Lallaward	April 21, 1987	Palomar	C. S. Shoemaker, E. M. Shoemaker	(5)	5.4 km (3.4 mi)	MPC · JPL
8348 Bhattacharyya	1988 BX	Bhattacharyya	January 26, 1988	Kavalur	Rajamohan, R.	H	8.3 km (5.2 mi)	MPC · JPL
8349	1988 DH_{1}	—	February 19, 1988	Gekko	Y. Oshima	·	3.8 km (2.4 mi)	MPC · JPL
8350	1989 AG	—	January 2, 1989	Okutama	Hioki, T., N. Kawasato	ADE	12 km (7.5 mi)	MPC · JPL
8351	1989 EH_{1}	—	March 10, 1989	Toyota	K. Suzuki, T. Furuta	·	10 km (6.2 mi)	MPC · JPL
8352	1989 GE	—	April 6, 1989	Kushiro	S. Ueda, H. Kaneda	·	4.7 km (2.9 mi)	MPC · JPL
8353 Megryan	1989 GC_{4}	Megryan	April 3, 1989	La Silla	E. W. Elst	·	6.5 km (4.0 mi)	MPC · JPL
8354	1989 RF	—	September 1, 1989	Haute-Provence	E. W. Elst	HYG	16 km (9.9 mi)	MPC · JPL
8355 Masuo	1989 RQ_{1}	Masuo	September 5, 1989	Palomar	E. F. Helin	·	3.9 km (2.4 mi)	MPC · JPL
8356 Wadhwa	1989 RO_{2}	Wadhwa	September 3, 1989	Palomar	C. S. Shoemaker, E. M. Shoemaker	·	6.7 km (4.2 mi)	MPC · JPL
8357 O'Connor	1989 SC_{1}	O'Connor	September 25, 1989	Harvard Observatory	Oak Ridge Observatory	·	4.1 km (2.5 mi)	MPC · JPL
8358 Rickblakley	1989 VN_{5}	Rickblakley	November 4, 1989	Palomar	C. S. Shoemaker, D. H. Levy	NYS	4.8 km (3.0 mi)	MPC · JPL
8359	1989 WD	—	November 19, 1989	Kushiro	S. Ueda, H. Kaneda	V	8.2 km (5.1 mi)	MPC · JPL
8360	1990 FD_{1}	—	March 26, 1990	Dynic	A. Sugie	EUN	10 km (6.2 mi)	MPC · JPL
8361	1990 JN_{1}	—	May 1, 1990	Siding Spring	A. Żytkow, M. J. Irwin	KOR	6.3 km (3.9 mi)	MPC · JPL
8362	1990 QM_{1}	—	August 22, 1990	Palomar	H. E. Holt	THM	12 km (7.5 mi)	MPC · JPL
8363	1990 RV	—	September 13, 1990	Palomar	C. M. Olmstead	THM	14 km (8.7 mi)	MPC · JPL
8364	1990 RE_{5}	—	September 15, 1990	Palomar	H. E. Holt	·	11 km (6.8 mi)	MPC · JPL
8365	1990 RR_{5}	—	September 15, 1990	Palomar	H. E. Holt	·	3.0 km (1.9 mi)	MPC · JPL
8366	1990 UL_{1}	—	October 20, 1990	Dynic	A. Sugie	·	3.8 km (2.4 mi)	MPC · JPL
8367 Bokusui	1990 UL_{2}	Bokusui	October 23, 1990	Geisei	T. Seki	·	3.7 km (2.3 mi)	MPC · JPL
8368 Lamont	1991 DM	Lamont	February 20, 1991	Siding Spring	R. H. McNaught	·	3.6 km (2.2 mi)	MPC · JPL
8369 Miyata	1991 GR	Miyata	April 8, 1991	Palomar	E. F. Helin	MAR	9.3 km (5.8 mi)	MPC · JPL
8370 Vanlindt	1991 RK_{11}	Vanlindt	September 4, 1991	La Silla	E. W. Elst	·	5.2 km (3.2 mi)	MPC · JPL
8371 Goven	1991 TJ_{14}	Goven	October 2, 1991	Palomar	C. P. de Saint-Aignan	·	7.5 km (4.7 mi)	MPC · JPL
8372	1991 VC_{2}	—	November 9, 1991	Kushiro	S. Ueda, H. Kaneda	EOS	8.9 km (5.5 mi)	MPC · JPL
8373 Stephengould	1992 AB	Stephengould	January 1, 1992	Palomar	C. S. Shoemaker, E. M. Shoemaker	T_{j} (2.59) · 2:1J (unstable) · moon	5.7 km (3.5 mi)	MPC · JPL
8374 Horohata	1992 AK_{1}	Horohata	January 10, 1992	Kiyosato	S. Otomo	THM	15 km (9.3 mi)	MPC · JPL
8375 Kenzokohno	1992 AP_{1}	Kenzokohno	January 12, 1992	Geisei	T. Seki	·	13 km (8.1 mi)	MPC · JPL
8376	1992 OZ_{9}	—	July 30, 1992	La Silla	H. Debehogne, Á. López-G.	3:2 · SHU	28 km (17 mi)	MPC · JPL
8377 Elmerreese	1992 SD_{1}	Elmerreese	September 23, 1992	Kitami	K. Endate, K. Watanabe	·	4.5 km (2.8 mi)	MPC · JPL
8378 Sweeney	1992 SN_{1}	Sweeney	September 23, 1992	Palomar	E. F. Helin	·	7.7 km (4.8 mi)	MPC · JPL
8379 Straczynski	1992 SW_{10}	Straczynski	September 27, 1992	Kitt Peak	Spacewatch	·	6.1 km (3.8 mi)	MPC · JPL
8380 Tooting	1992 SW_{17}	Tooting	September 29, 1992	Palomar	H. E. Holt	·	10 km (6.2 mi)	MPC · JPL
8381 Hauptmann	1992 SO_{24}	Hauptmann	September 21, 1992	Tautenburg Observatory	F. Börngen	·	5.7 km (3.5 mi)	MPC · JPL
8382 Mann	1992 SQ_{26}	Mann	September 23, 1992	Tautenburg Observatory	F. Börngen	·	4.0 km (2.5 mi)	MPC · JPL
8383	1992 UA_{3}	—	October 25, 1992	Okutama	Hioki, T., Hayakawa, S.	·	6.9 km (4.3 mi)	MPC · JPL
8384	1992 YB	—	December 16, 1992	Oohira	T. Urata	·	4.7 km (2.9 mi)	MPC · JPL
8385	1993 AN	—	January 13, 1993	Kushiro	S. Ueda, H. Kaneda	THM	12 km (7.5 mi)	MPC · JPL
8386 Vanvinckenroye	1993 BB_{6}	Vanvinckenroye	January 27, 1993	Caussols	E. W. Elst	KOR	5.7 km (3.5 mi)	MPC · JPL
8387 Fujimori	1993 DO	Fujimori	February 19, 1993	Geisei	T. Seki	EOS	10 km (6.2 mi)	MPC · JPL
8388	1993 FO_{6}	—	March 17, 1993	La Silla	UESAC	KOR	7.9 km (4.9 mi)	MPC · JPL
8389	1993 FT_{37}	—	March 19, 1993	La Silla	UESAC	·	10 km (6.2 mi)	MPC · JPL
8390	1993 FE_{48}	—	March 19, 1993	La Silla	UESAC	·	12 km (7.5 mi)	MPC · JPL
8391 Kring	1993 HH_{3}	Kring	April 20, 1993	Kitt Peak	Spacewatch	·	8.0 km (5.0 mi)	MPC · JPL
8392	1993 OP	—	July 18, 1993	Palomar	E. F. Helin	PHO	4.3 km (2.7 mi)	MPC · JPL
8393 Tetsumasakamoto	1993 TJ_{1}	Tetsumasakamoto	October 15, 1993	Kitami	K. Endate, K. Watanabe	(2076)	5.3 km (3.3 mi)	MPC · JPL
8394	1993 TM_{12}	—	October 13, 1993	Palomar	H. E. Holt	slow	3.9 km (2.4 mi)	MPC · JPL
8395 Rembaut	1993 TQ_{23}	Rembaut	October 9, 1993	La Silla	E. W. Elst	·	3.3 km (2.1 mi)	MPC · JPL
8396	1993 UR_{2}	—	October 19, 1993	Palomar	E. F. Helin	·	4.0 km (2.5 mi)	MPC · JPL
8397 Chiakitanaka	1993 XO	Chiakitanaka	December 8, 1993	Kiyosato	S. Otomo	EUN	7.4 km (4.6 mi)	MPC · JPL
8398 Rubbia	1993 XY	Rubbia	December 12, 1993	Farra d'Isonzo	Farra d'Isonzo	·	3.1 km (1.9 mi)	MPC · JPL
8399 Wakamatsu	1994 AD	Wakamatsu	January 2, 1994	Oizumi	T. Kobayashi	MAS ·	5.8 km (3.6 mi)	MPC · JPL
8400 Tomizo	1994 AQ	Tomizo	January 4, 1994	Oizumi	T. Kobayashi	EUN	7.7 km (4.8 mi)	MPC · JPL

== 8401–8500 ==
back to top

Designation			Discovery			Properties		Ref
Permanent	Provisional	Named after	Date	Site	Discoverer(s)	Category	Diam.	Ref
8401 Assirelli	1994 DA	Assirelli	February 16, 1994	Farra d'Isonzo	Farra d'Isonzo	·	4.9 km (3.0 mi)	MPC · JPL
8402	1994 GH_{9}	—	April 11, 1994	Palomar	E. F. Helin	·	9.8 km (6.1 mi)	MPC · JPL
8403 Minorushimizu	1994 JG	Minorushimizu	May 6, 1994	Oizumi	T. Kobayashi	EOS	8.4 km (5.2 mi)	MPC · JPL
8404	1995 AN	—	January 1, 1995	Catalina Station	T. B. Spahr	H	4.3 km (2.7 mi)	MPC · JPL
8405 Asbolus	1995 GO	Asbolus	April 5, 1995	Spacewatch	Spacewatch	centaur	66 km (41 mi)	MPC · JPL
8406 Iwaokusano	1995 HJ	Iwaokusano	April 20, 1995	Kitami	K. Endate, K. Watanabe	·	3.8 km (2.4 mi)	MPC · JPL
8407 Houlahan	1995 ON	Houlahan	July 25, 1995	Prescott	P. G. Comba	·	4.1 km (2.5 mi)	MPC · JPL
8408 Strom	1995 SX_{12}	Strom	September 18, 1995	Kitt Peak	Spacewatch	·	8.3 km (5.2 mi)	MPC · JPL
8409 Valentaugustus	1995 WB_{43}	Valentaugustus	November 28, 1995	Socorro	R. Weber	·	15 km (9.3 mi)	MPC · JPL
8410 Hiroakiohno	1996 QZ_{1}	Hiroakiohno	August 24, 1996	Kushiro	S. Ueda, H. Kaneda	THM	13 km (8.1 mi)	MPC · JPL
8411 Celso	1996 TO	Celso	October 3, 1996	Farra d'Isonzo	Farra d'Isonzo	·	2.4 km (1.5 mi)	MPC · JPL
8412 Zhaozhongxian	1996 TM_{6}	Zhaozhongxian	October 7, 1996	Xinglong	SCAP	MAS	2.1 km (1.3 mi)	MPC · JPL
8413 Kawakami	1996 TV_{10}	Kawakami	October 9, 1996	Kushiro	S. Ueda, H. Kaneda	·	5.3 km (3.3 mi)	MPC · JPL
8414 Atsuko	1996 TW_{10}	Atsuko	October 9, 1996	Kushiro	S. Ueda, H. Kaneda	·	5.3 km (3.3 mi)	MPC · JPL
8415	1996 UT	—	October 16, 1996	Nachi-Katsuura	Y. Shimizu, T. Urata	THM	15 km (9.3 mi)	MPC · JPL
8416 Okada	1996 VB_{8}	Okada	November 3, 1996	Kushiro	S. Ueda, H. Kaneda	·	4.2 km (2.6 mi)	MPC · JPL
8417 Lancetaylor	1996 VG_{8}	Lancetaylor	November 7, 1996	Kitami	K. Endate, K. Watanabe	·	4.2 km (2.6 mi)	MPC · JPL
8418 Mogamigawa	1996 VS_{30}	Mogamigawa	November 10, 1996	Nanyo	T. Okuni	·	9.4 km (5.8 mi)	MPC · JPL
8419 Terumikazumi	1996 VK_{38}	Terumikazumi	November 7, 1996	Kushiro	S. Ueda, H. Kaneda	·	9.9 km (6.2 mi)	MPC · JPL
8420 Angrogna	1996 WQ	Angrogna	November 17, 1996	Prescott	P. G. Comba	EUN	7.1 km (4.4 mi)	MPC · JPL
8421 Montanari	1996 XA_{9}	Montanari	December 2, 1996	Bologna	San Vittore	KOR	5.7 km (3.5 mi)	MPC · JPL
8422 Mohorovičıć	1996 XJ_{26}	Mohorovičıć	December 5, 1996	Farra d'Isonzo	Farra d'Isonzo	·	5.4 km (3.4 mi)	MPC · JPL
8423 Macao	1997 AO_{22}	Macao	January 11, 1997	Xinglong	SCAP	·	11 km (6.8 mi)	MPC · JPL
8424 Toshitsumita	1997 CP	Toshitsumita	February 1, 1997	Oizumi	T. Kobayashi	·	5.2 km (3.2 mi)	MPC · JPL
8425 Zirankexuejijin	1997 CJ_{29}	Zirankexuejijin	February 14, 1997	Xinglong	SCAP	·	4.4 km (2.7 mi)	MPC · JPL
8426	1997 ST	—	September 16, 1997	Xinglong	SCAP	·	4.3 km (2.7 mi)	MPC · JPL
8427	1997 TH_{17}	—	October 6, 1997	Nachi-Katsuura	Y. Shimizu, T. Urata	·	17 km (11 mi)	MPC · JPL
8428 Okiko	1997 VJ_{8}	Okiko	November 3, 1997	Geisei	T. Seki	NYS	3.2 km (2.0 mi)	MPC · JPL
8429	1997 YK_{4}	—	December 23, 1997	Xinglong	SCAP	·	15 km (9.3 mi)	MPC · JPL
8430 Florey	1997 YB_{5}	Florey	December 25, 1997	Woomera	F. B. Zoltowski	·	8.0 km (5.0 mi)	MPC · JPL
8431 Haseda	1997 YQ_{13}	Haseda	December 31, 1997	Oizumi	T. Kobayashi	·	7.5 km (4.7 mi)	MPC · JPL
8432 Tamakasuga	1997 YD_{18}	Tamakasuga	December 27, 1997	Kuma Kogen	A. Nakamura	THM	11 km (6.8 mi)	MPC · JPL
8433 Brachyrhynchus	2561 P-L	Brachyrhynchus	September 24, 1960	Palomar	C. J. van Houten, I. van Houten-Groeneveld, T. Gehrels	·	9.7 km (6.0 mi)	MPC · JPL
8434 Columbianus	6571 P-L	Columbianus	September 24, 1960	Palomar	C. J. van Houten, I. van Houten-Groeneveld, T. Gehrels	·	10 km (6.2 mi)	MPC · JPL
8435 Anser	6643 P-L	Anser	September 26, 1960	Palomar	C. J. van Houten, I. van Houten-Groeneveld, T. Gehrels	·	2.9 km (1.8 mi)	MPC · JPL
8436 Leucopsis	2259 T-1	Leucopsis	March 25, 1971	Palomar	C. J. van Houten, I. van Houten-Groeneveld, T. Gehrels	·	9.6 km (6.0 mi)	MPC · JPL
8437 Bernicla	3057 T-1	Bernicla	March 26, 1971	Palomar	C. J. van Houten, I. van Houten-Groeneveld, T. Gehrels	·	2.8 km (1.7 mi)	MPC · JPL
8438 Marila	4825 T-1	Marila	May 13, 1971	Palomar	C. J. van Houten, I. van Houten-Groeneveld, T. Gehrels	·	3.8 km (2.4 mi)	MPC · JPL
8439 Albellus	2034 T-2	Albellus	September 29, 1973	Palomar	C. J. van Houten, I. van Houten-Groeneveld, T. Gehrels	THM	11 km (6.8 mi)	MPC · JPL
8440 Wigeon	1017 T-3	Wigeon	October 17, 1977	Palomar	C. J. van Houten, I. van Houten-Groeneveld, T. Gehrels	GEF	6.4 km (4.0 mi)	MPC · JPL
8441 Lapponica	4008 T-3	Lapponica	October 16, 1977	Palomar	C. J. van Houten, I. van Houten-Groeneveld, T. Gehrels	·	4.5 km (2.8 mi)	MPC · JPL
8442 Ostralegus	4237 T-3	Ostralegus	October 16, 1977	Palomar	C. J. van Houten, I. van Houten-Groeneveld, T. Gehrels	·	4.1 km (2.5 mi)	MPC · JPL
8443 Svecica	4343 T-3	Svecica	October 16, 1977	Palomar	C. J. van Houten, I. van Houten-Groeneveld, T. Gehrels	·	12 km (7.5 mi)	MPC · JPL
8444 Popovich	1969 TR_{1}	Popovich	October 8, 1969	Nauchnij	L. I. Chernykh	·	4.6 km (2.9 mi)	MPC · JPL
8445 Novotroitskoe	1973 QG_{2}	Novotroitskoe	August 31, 1973	Nauchnij	T. M. Smirnova	·	13 km (8.1 mi)	MPC · JPL
8446 Tazieff	1973 SB_{6}	Tazieff	September 28, 1973	Nauchnij	N. S. Chernykh	MAS	2.5 km (1.6 mi)	MPC · JPL
8447 Cornejo	1974 OE	Cornejo	July 16, 1974	El Leoncito	Félix Aguilar Observatory	V	3.3 km (2.1 mi)	MPC · JPL
8448 Belyakina	1976 UT_{1}	Belyakina	October 26, 1976	Nauchnij	T. M. Smirnova	·	3.9 km (2.4 mi)	MPC · JPL
8449 Maslovets	1977 EO_{1}	Maslovets	March 13, 1977	Nauchnij	N. S. Chernykh	slow	14 km (8.7 mi)	MPC · JPL
8450 Egorov	1977 QL_{1}	Egorov	August 19, 1977	Nauchnij	N. S. Chernykh	PAD	11 km (6.8 mi)	MPC · JPL
8451 Gaidai	1977 RY_{6}	Gaidai	September 11, 1977	Nauchnij	N. S. Chernykh	GEF	4.9 km (3.0 mi)	MPC · JPL
8452 Clay	1978 WB	Clay	November 27, 1978	Harvard Observatory	Harvard Observatory	MAS	3.3 km (2.1 mi)	MPC · JPL
8453 Flaviataldini	1981 EQ	Flaviataldini	March 1, 1981	La Silla	H. Debehogne, G. de Sanctis	·	16 km (9.9 mi)	MPC · JPL
8454 Micheleferrero	1981 EG_{1}	Micheleferrero	March 5, 1981	La Silla	H. Debehogne, G. de Sanctis	·	10 km (6.2 mi)	MPC · JPL
8455 Johnrayner	1981 ER_{6}	Johnrayner	March 6, 1981	Siding Spring	S. J. Bus	·	5.8 km (3.6 mi)	MPC · JPL
8456 Davegriep	1981 EJ_{7}	Davegriep	March 1, 1981	Siding Spring	S. J. Bus	·	18 km (11 mi)	MPC · JPL
8457 Billgolisch	1981 EO_{8}	Billgolisch	March 1, 1981	Siding Spring	S. J. Bus	slow	4.4 km (2.7 mi)	MPC · JPL
8458 Georgekoenig	1981 EY_{9}	Georgekoenig	March 1, 1981	Siding Spring	S. J. Bus	·	2.5 km (1.6 mi)	MPC · JPL
8459 Larsbergknut	1981 EQ_{18}	Larsbergknut	March 2, 1981	Siding Spring	S. J. Bus	THM	10 km (6.2 mi)	MPC · JPL
8460 Imainamahoe	1981 EP_{19}	Imainamahoe	March 2, 1981	Siding Spring	S. J. Bus	·	3.0 km (1.9 mi)	MPC · JPL
8461 Sammiepung	1981 EC_{21}	Sammiepung	March 2, 1981	Siding Spring	S. J. Bus	·	4.7 km (2.9 mi)	MPC · JPL
8462 Hazelsears	1981 ED_{22}	Hazelsears	March 2, 1981	Siding Spring	S. J. Bus	·	3.3 km (2.1 mi)	MPC · JPL
8463 Naomimurdoch	1981 EM_{27}	Naomimurdoch	March 2, 1981	Siding Spring	S. J. Bus	·	7.1 km (4.4 mi)	MPC · JPL
8464 Polishook	1981 EF_{28}	Polishook	March 2, 1981	Siding Spring	S. J. Bus	·	5.7 km (3.5 mi)	MPC · JPL
8465 Bancelin	1981 EQ_{31}	Bancelin	March 2, 1981	Siding Spring	S. J. Bus	slow	7.7 km (4.8 mi)	MPC · JPL
8466 Leyrat	1981 EV_{34}	Leyrat	March 2, 1981	Siding Spring	S. J. Bus	·	3.9 km (2.4 mi)	MPC · JPL
8467 Benoîtcarry	1981 ES_{35}	Benoîtcarry	March 2, 1981	Siding Spring	S. J. Bus	·	6.4 km (4.0 mi)	MPC · JPL
8468 Rhondastroud	1981 EA_{40}	Rhondastroud	March 2, 1981	Siding Spring	S. J. Bus	·	6.8 km (4.2 mi)	MPC · JPL
8469	1981 TZ	—	October 5, 1981	Anderson Mesa	N. G. Thomas	GEF	7.5 km (4.7 mi)	MPC · JPL
8470 Dudinskaya	1982 SA_{4}	Dudinskaya	September 17, 1982	Nauchnij	N. S. Chernykh	·	4.9 km (3.0 mi)	MPC · JPL
8471 Obrant	1983 RX_{4}	Obrant	September 5, 1983	Nauchnij	L. V. Zhuravleva	·	3.1 km (1.9 mi)	MPC · JPL
8472 Tarroni	1983 TC	Tarroni	October 12, 1983	Bologna	San Vittore	EUN	6.5 km (4.0 mi)	MPC · JPL
8473	1984 SS_{5}	—	September 21, 1984	La Silla	H. Debehogne	HYG	9.8 km (6.1 mi)	MPC · JPL
8474 Rettig	1985 GA_{1}	Rettig	April 15, 1985	Anderson Mesa	E. Bowell	(883) · moon	4.2 km (2.6 mi)	MPC · JPL
8475 Vsevoivanov	1985 PC_{2}	Vsevoivanov	August 13, 1985	Nauchnij	N. S. Chernykh	slow	14 km (8.7 mi)	MPC · JPL
8476	1986 QT_{2}	—	August 28, 1986	La Silla	H. Debehogne	·	3.0 km (1.9 mi)	MPC · JPL
8477 Andrejkiselev	1986 RF_{7}	Andrejkiselev	September 6, 1986	Nauchnij	L. V. Zhuravleva	·	3.2 km (2.0 mi)	MPC · JPL
8478	1987 DO_{6}	—	February 23, 1987	La Silla	H. Debehogne	·	24 km (15 mi)	MPC · JPL
8479 Held	1987 HD_{2}	Held	April 29, 1987	Kleť	A. Mrkos	·	5.0 km (3.1 mi)	MPC · JPL
8480	1987 RD_{1}	—	September 13, 1987	La Silla	H. Debehogne	MIS	12 km (7.5 mi)	MPC · JPL
8481	1988 LH	—	June 14, 1988	Lake Tekapo	A. C. Gilmore, P. M. Kilmartin	·	8.0 km (5.0 mi)	MPC · JPL
8482 Wayneolm	1988 RA_{11}	Wayneolm	September 14, 1988	Cerro Tololo	S. J. Bus	CYB	14 km (8.7 mi)	MPC · JPL
8483 Kinwalaniihsia	1988 SY_{1}	Kinwalaniihsia	September 16, 1988	Cerro Tololo	S. J. Bus	·	3.8 km (2.4 mi)	MPC · JPL
8484	1988 VM_{2}	—	November 10, 1988	Yorii	M. Arai, H. Mori	·	5.0 km (3.1 mi)	MPC · JPL
8485 Satoru	1989 FL	Satoru	March 29, 1989	Geisei	T. Seki	slow	5.8 km (3.6 mi)	MPC · JPL
8486 Asherschel	1989 QV	Asherschel	August 26, 1989	Siding Spring	R. H. McNaught	·	11 km (6.8 mi)	MPC · JPL
8487 Takedashin	1989 SQ	Takedashin	September 29, 1989	Kani	Y. Mizuno, T. Furuta	·	11 km (6.8 mi)	MPC · JPL
8488 d'Argens	1989 SR_{1}	d'Argens	September 26, 1989	La Silla	E. W. Elst	·	3.3 km (2.1 mi)	MPC · JPL
8489 Boulder	1989 TA_{3}	Boulder	October 7, 1989	La Silla	E. W. Elst	HYG	11 km (6.8 mi)	MPC · JPL
8490 Akiehashimoto	1989 TU_{10}	Akiehashimoto	October 4, 1989	Kani	Y. Mizuno, T. Furuta	·	2.6 km (1.6 mi)	MPC · JPL
8491 Joelle-gilles	1989 YL_{5}	Joelle-gilles	December 28, 1989	Haute-Provence	E. W. Elst	NYS	5.8 km (3.6 mi)	MPC · JPL
8492 Kikuoka	1990 BZ	Kikuoka	January 21, 1990	Geisei	T. Seki	MAR	4.7 km (2.9 mi)	MPC · JPL
8493 Yachibozu	1990 BY_{1}	Yachibozu	January 30, 1990	Kushiro	Matsuyama, M., K. Watanabe	·	9.1 km (5.7 mi)	MPC · JPL
8494 Edpatvega	1990 OT_{4}	Edpatvega	July 25, 1990	Palomar	H. E. Holt	ADE	11 km (6.8 mi)	MPC · JPL
8495	1990 QV_{1}	—	August 22, 1990	Palomar	H. E. Holt	KOR	5.4 km (3.4 mi)	MPC · JPL
8496 Jandlsmith	1990 QO_{3}	Jandlsmith	August 16, 1990	Harvard Observatory	Oak Ridge Observatory	EOS	13 km (8.1 mi)	MPC · JPL
8497	1990 RE_{7}	—	September 13, 1990	La Silla	H. Debehogne	EOS	6.8 km (4.2 mi)	MPC · JPL
8498 Ufa	1990 RM_{17}	Ufa	September 15, 1990	Nauchnij	L. V. Zhuravleva	EOS	9.5 km (5.9 mi)	MPC · JPL
8499	1990 SC_{13}	—	September 22, 1990	La Silla	H. Debehogne	KOR	8.4 km (5.2 mi)	MPC · JPL
8500 Hori	1990 TU	Hori	October 10, 1990	Kitami	K. Endate, K. Watanabe	·	6.6 km (4.1 mi)	MPC · JPL

== 8501–8600 ==
back to top

Designation			Discovery			Properties		Ref
Permanent	Provisional	Named after	Date	Site	Discoverer(s)	Category	Diam.	Ref
8501 Wachholz	1990 TK_{8}	Wachholz	October 13, 1990	Tautenburg Observatory	L. D. Schmadel, F. Börngen	EOS	9.4 km (5.8 mi)	MPC · JPL
8502 Bauhaus	1990 TR_{12}	Bauhaus	October 14, 1990	Tautenburg Observatory	F. Börngen, L. D. Schmadel	EOS	9.6 km (6.0 mi)	MPC · JPL
8503 Masakatsu	1990 WX_{3}	Masakatsu	November 21, 1990	Kitami	K. Endate, K. Watanabe	·	3.5 km (2.2 mi)	MPC · JPL
8504	1990 YC	—	December 17, 1990	Kushiro	S. Ueda, H. Kaneda	·	4.3 km (2.7 mi)	MPC · JPL
8505	1990 YK	—	December 19, 1990	Kushiro	S. Ueda, H. Kaneda	·	3.9 km (2.4 mi)	MPC · JPL
8506	1991 CN	—	February 5, 1991	Yorii	M. Arai, H. Mori	·	4.5 km (2.8 mi)	MPC · JPL
8507	1991 CB_{1}	—	February 15, 1991	Kitt Peak	Spacewatch	APO +1 km (0.62 mi)	1.3 km (0.81 mi)	MPC · JPL
8508	1991 CU_{1}	—	February 14, 1991	Kushiro	S. Ueda, H. Kaneda	·	4.8 km (3.0 mi)	MPC · JPL
8509	1991 FV_{2}	—	March 20, 1991	La Silla	H. Debehogne	·	2.7 km (1.7 mi)	MPC · JPL
8510	1991 PT_{8}	—	August 5, 1991	Palomar	H. E. Holt	·	7.6 km (4.7 mi)	MPC · JPL
8511	1991 PY_{10}	—	August 7, 1991	Palomar	H. E. Holt	GEF ·	6.9 km (4.3 mi)	MPC · JPL
8512	1991 PC_{11}	—	August 7, 1991	Palomar	H. E. Holt	·	15 km (9.3 mi)	MPC · JPL
8513	1991 PK_{11}	—	August 9, 1991	Palomar	H. E. Holt	·	13 km (8.1 mi)	MPC · JPL
8514	1991 PK_{15}	—	August 7, 1991	Palomar	H. E. Holt	(5)	5.9 km (3.7 mi)	MPC · JPL
8515 Corvan	1991 RJ	Corvan	September 4, 1991	Siding Spring	R. H. McNaught	EUN	5.9 km (3.7 mi)	MPC · JPL
8516 Hyakkai	1991 TW_{1}	Hyakkai	October 13, 1991	Okutama	Hioki, T., Hayakawa, S.	MRX	5.7 km (3.5 mi)	MPC · JPL
8517	1992 BB_{5}	—	January 28, 1992	Kushiro	S. Ueda, H. Kaneda	·	10 km (6.2 mi)	MPC · JPL
8518	1992 DM_{6}	—	February 29, 1992	La Silla	UESAC	THM	13 km (8.1 mi)	MPC · JPL
8519	1992 DB_{10}	—	February 29, 1992	La Silla	UESAC	·	6.7 km (4.2 mi)	MPC · JPL
8520	1992 EC_{12}	—	March 6, 1992	La Silla	UESAC	·	14 km (8.7 mi)	MPC · JPL
8521 Boulainvilliers	1992 GF_{4}	Boulainvilliers	April 4, 1992	La Silla	E. W. Elst	·	3.6 km (2.2 mi)	MPC · JPL
8522	1992 ML	—	June 25, 1992	Palomar	G. J. Leonard	·	4.4 km (2.7 mi)	MPC · JPL
8523 Bouillabaisse	1992 PX	Bouillabaisse	August 8, 1992	Caussols	E. W. Elst	·	4.0 km (2.5 mi)	MPC · JPL
8524 Paoloruffini	1992 RJ_{3}	Paoloruffini	September 2, 1992	La Silla	E. W. Elst	·	5.0 km (3.1 mi)	MPC · JPL
8525 Nielsabel	1992 RZ_{5}	Nielsabel	September 2, 1992	La Silla	E. W. Elst	·	4.3 km (2.7 mi)	MPC · JPL
8526 Takeuchiyukou	1992 SM_{12}	Takeuchiyukou	September 23, 1992	Kitami	K. Endate, K. Watanabe	slow	2.6 km (1.6 mi)	MPC · JPL
8527 Katayama	1992 SV_{12}	Katayama	September 28, 1992	Kitami	K. Endate, K. Watanabe	·	4.0 km (2.5 mi)	MPC · JPL
8528	1992 SC_{24}	—	September 29, 1992	Palomar	H. E. Holt	V	4.0 km (2.5 mi)	MPC · JPL
8529 Sinzi	1992 UH_{2}	Sinzi	October 19, 1992	Kitami	K. Endate, K. Watanabe	V	3.2 km (2.0 mi)	MPC · JPL
8530 Korbokkur	1992 UK_{5}	Korbokkur	October 25, 1992	Nyukasa	M. Hirasawa, S. Suzuki	·	5.9 km (3.7 mi)	MPC · JPL
8531 Mineosaito	1992 WX_{2}	Mineosaito	November 16, 1992	Kitami	K. Endate, K. Watanabe	·	11 km (6.8 mi)	MPC · JPL
8532	1992 YW_{3}	—	December 29, 1992	Yatsugatake	Y. Kushida, O. Muramatsu	·	8.8 km (5.5 mi)	MPC · JPL
8533 Oohira	1993 BM	Oohira	January 20, 1993	Oohira	T. Urata	GEF	6.6 km (4.1 mi)	MPC · JPL
8534 Knutsson	1993 FJ_{10}	Knutsson	March 17, 1993	La Silla	C.-I. Lagerkvist	KOR	7.3 km (4.5 mi)	MPC · JPL
8535 Pellesvanslös	1993 FH_{22}	Pellesvanslös	March 21, 1993	La Silla	C.-I. Lagerkvist	THM	12 km (7.5 mi)	MPC · JPL
8536 Måns	1993 FK_{23}	Måns	March 21, 1993	La Silla	C.-I. Lagerkvist	·	5.8 km (3.6 mi)	MPC · JPL
8537 Billochbull	1993 FG_{24}	Billochbull	March 21, 1993	La Silla	C.-I. Lagerkvist	EOS	12 km (7.5 mi)	MPC · JPL
8538 Gammelmaja	1993 FR_{26}	Gammelmaja	March 21, 1993	La Silla	C.-I. Lagerkvist	EOS	12 km (7.5 mi)	MPC · JPL
8539 Laban	1993 FT_{32}	Laban	March 19, 1993	La Silla	C.-I. Lagerkvist	KOR	6.6 km (4.1 mi)	MPC · JPL
8540 Ardeberg	1993 FK_{80}	Ardeberg	March 17, 1993	La Silla	UESAC	·	9.5 km (5.9 mi)	MPC · JPL
8541 Schalkenmehren	1993 TZ_{32}	Schalkenmehren	October 9, 1993	La Silla	E. W. Elst	·	2.8 km (1.7 mi)	MPC · JPL
8542	1993 VB_{2}	—	November 11, 1993	Kushiro	S. Ueda, H. Kaneda	·	4.1 km (2.5 mi)	MPC · JPL
8543 Tsunemi	1993 XO_{1}	Tsunemi	December 15, 1993	Oizumi	T. Kobayashi	·	3.8 km (2.4 mi)	MPC · JPL
8544 Sigenori	1993 YE	Sigenori	December 17, 1993	Oizumi	T. Kobayashi	·	2.7 km (1.7 mi)	MPC · JPL
8545 McGee	1994 AM_{1}	McGee	January 2, 1994	Stakenbridge	B. G. W. Manning	V	2.3 km (1.4 mi)	MPC · JPL
8546 Kenmotsu	1994 AH_{3}	Kenmotsu	January 13, 1994	Kitami	K. Endate, K. Watanabe	·	5.1 km (3.2 mi)	MPC · JPL
8547	1994 CQ	—	February 4, 1994	Kushiro	S. Ueda, H. Kaneda	NYS	3.8 km (2.4 mi)	MPC · JPL
8548 Sumizihara	1994 ER_{3}	Sumizihara	March 14, 1994	Kitami	K. Endate, K. Watanabe	·	5.3 km (3.3 mi)	MPC · JPL
8549 Alcide	1994 FS	Alcide	March 30, 1994	Farra d'Isonzo	Farra d'Isonzo	NYS	4.3 km (2.7 mi)	MPC · JPL
8550 Hesiodos	1994 PV_{24}	Hesiodos	August 12, 1994	La Silla	E. W. Elst	3:2 · SHU	25 km (16 mi)	MPC · JPL
8551 Daitarabochi	1994 VC_{7}	Daitarabochi	November 11, 1994	Nyukasa	M. Hirasawa, S. Suzuki	T_{j} (2.98) · 3:2	40 km (25 mi)	MPC · JPL
8552 Hyoichi	1995 HE	Hyoichi	April 20, 1995	Kuma Kogen	A. Nakamura	·	8.9 km (5.5 mi)	MPC · JPL
8553 Bradsmith	1995 HG	Bradsmith	April 20, 1995	Kitami	K. Endate, K. Watanabe	·	4.6 km (2.9 mi)	MPC · JPL
8554 Gabreta	1995 KH	Gabreta	May 25, 1995	Kleť	M. Tichý	·	2.4 km (1.5 mi)	MPC · JPL
8555 Mirimao	1995 LD	Mirimao	June 3, 1995	Stroncone	Santa Lucia	V	2.4 km (1.5 mi)	MPC · JPL
8556 Jana	1995 NB	Jana	July 7, 1995	Kleť	Z. Moravec	·	7.3 km (4.5 mi)	MPC · JPL
8557 Šaroun	1995 OK	Šaroun	July 23, 1995	Ondřejov	L. Kotková	V	2.0 km (1.2 mi)	MPC · JPL
8558 Hack	1995 PC	Hack	August 1, 1995	San Marcello	L. Tesi, A. Boattini	·	7.7 km (4.8 mi)	MPC · JPL
8559	1995 QM_{2}	—	August 25, 1995	Nachi-Katsuura	Y. Shimizu, T. Urata	AGN	6.6 km (4.1 mi)	MPC · JPL
8560 Tsubaki	1995 SD_{5}	Tsubaki	September 20, 1995	Kitami	K. Endate, K. Watanabe	·	19 km (12 mi)	MPC · JPL
8561 Sikoruk	1995 SO_{29}	Sikoruk	September 26, 1995	Zelenchukskaya	T. V. Krjačko	THM	12 km (7.5 mi)	MPC · JPL
8562	1995 SK_{53}	—	September 28, 1995	Xinglong	SCAP	·	7.0 km (4.3 mi)	MPC · JPL
8563	1995 US	—	October 19, 1995	Catalina Station	T. B. Spahr	·	14 km (8.7 mi)	MPC · JPL
8564 Anomalocaris	1995 UL_{3}	Anomalocaris	October 17, 1995	Nachi-Katsuura	Y. Shimizu, T. Urata	·	17 km (11 mi)	MPC · JPL
8565	1995 WB_{6}	—	November 24, 1995	Ojima	T. Niijima, T. Urata	GEF ·	16 km (9.9 mi)	MPC · JPL
8566	1996 EN	—	March 15, 1996	Haleakalā	NEAT	APO +1 km (0.62 mi) · PHA	1.6 km (0.99 mi)	MPC · JPL
8567	1996 HW_{1}	—	April 23, 1996	Kitt Peak	Spacewatch	AMO +1 km (0.62 mi)	2.9 km (1.8 mi)	MPC · JPL
8568 Larrywilson	1996 RU_{2}	Larrywilson	September 10, 1996	Haleakalā	NEAT	·	3.1 km (1.9 mi)	MPC · JPL
8569 Mameli	1996 TG	Mameli	October 1, 1996	Colleverde	V. S. Casulli	·	3.3 km (2.1 mi)	MPC · JPL
8570	1996 TN_{10}	—	October 9, 1996	Kushiro	S. Ueda, H. Kaneda	EOS	10 km (6.2 mi)	MPC · JPL
8571 Taniguchi	1996 UX	Taniguchi	October 20, 1996	Oizumi	T. Kobayashi	KOR	6.2 km (3.9 mi)	MPC · JPL
8572 Nijo	1996 UG_{1}	Nijo	October 19, 1996	Kleť	J. Tichá, M. Tichý	·	3.0 km (1.9 mi)	MPC · JPL
8573 Ivanka	1996 VQ	Ivanka	November 4, 1996	Kleť	Z. Moravec	·	11 km (6.8 mi)	MPC · JPL
8574 Makotoirie	1996 VC_{2}	Makotoirie	November 6, 1996	Oizumi	T. Kobayashi	·	2.5 km (1.6 mi)	MPC · JPL
8575 Seishitakeuchi	1996 VL_{8}	Seishitakeuchi	November 7, 1996	Kitami	K. Endate, K. Watanabe	·	3.1 km (1.9 mi)	MPC · JPL
8576	1996 VN_{8}	—	November 7, 1996	Kushiro	S. Ueda, H. Kaneda	NYS	4.8 km (3.0 mi)	MPC · JPL
8577 Choseikomori	1996 VX_{8}	Choseikomori	November 7, 1996	Kitami	K. Endate, K. Watanabe	·	4.6 km (2.9 mi)	MPC · JPL
8578 Shojikato	1996 WZ	Shojikato	November 19, 1996	Oizumi	T. Kobayashi	EOS	12 km (7.5 mi)	MPC · JPL
8579 Hieizan	1996 XV_{19}	Hieizan	December 11, 1996	Oizumi	T. Kobayashi	·	11 km (6.8 mi)	MPC · JPL
8580 Pinsky	1996 XZ_{25}	Pinsky	December 14, 1996	Prescott	P. G. Comba	·	14 km (8.7 mi)	MPC · JPL
8581 Johnen	1996 YO_{2}	Johnen	December 28, 1996	Chichibu	N. Satō	KOR	5.8 km (3.6 mi)	MPC · JPL
8582 Kazuhisa	1997 AY	Kazuhisa	January 2, 1997	Oizumi	T. Kobayashi	·	15 km (9.3 mi)	MPC · JPL
8583 Froberger	1997 AK_{6}	Froberger	January 8, 1997	Prescott	P. G. Comba	·	6.4 km (4.0 mi)	MPC · JPL
8584	1997 AN_{22}	—	January 11, 1997	Xinglong	SCAP	EOS	12 km (7.5 mi)	MPC · JPL
8585 Purpurea	2025 P-L	Purpurea	September 24, 1960	Palomar	C. J. van Houten, I. van Houten-Groeneveld, T. Gehrels	·	17 km (11 mi)	MPC · JPL
8586 Epops	2563 P-L	Epops	September 24, 1960	Palomar	C. J. van Houten, I. van Houten-Groeneveld, T. Gehrels	THM	15 km (9.3 mi)	MPC · JPL
8587 Ruficollis	3078 P-L	Ruficollis	September 25, 1960	Palomar	C. J. van Houten, I. van Houten-Groeneveld, T. Gehrels	·	3.1 km (1.9 mi)	MPC · JPL
8588 Avosetta	4025 P-L	Avosetta	September 24, 1960	Palomar	C. J. van Houten, I. van Houten-Groeneveld, T. Gehrels	·	3.1 km (1.9 mi)	MPC · JPL
8589 Stellaris	4068 P-L	Stellaris	September 24, 1960	Palomar	C. J. van Houten, I. van Houten-Groeneveld, T. Gehrels	·	3.1 km (1.9 mi)	MPC · JPL
8590 Pygargus	6533 P-L	Pygargus	September 24, 1960	Palomar	C. J. van Houten, I. van Houten-Groeneveld, T. Gehrels	THM	11 km (6.8 mi)	MPC · JPL
8591 Excubitor	6543 P-L	Excubitor	September 24, 1960	Palomar	C. J. van Houten, I. van Houten-Groeneveld, T. Gehrels	THM	15 km (9.3 mi)	MPC · JPL
8592 Rubetra	1188 T-1	Rubetra	March 25, 1971	Palomar	C. J. van Houten, I. van Houten-Groeneveld, T. Gehrels	·	4.5 km (2.8 mi)	MPC · JPL
8593 Angustirostris	2186 T-1	Angustirostris	March 25, 1971	Palomar	C. J. van Houten, I. van Houten-Groeneveld, T. Gehrels	·	20 km (12 mi)	MPC · JPL
8594 Albifrons	2245 T-1	Albifrons	March 25, 1971	Palomar	C. J. van Houten, I. van Houten-Groeneveld, T. Gehrels	NYS	3.0 km (1.9 mi)	MPC · JPL
8595 Dougallii	3233 T-1	Dougallii	March 26, 1971	Palomar	C. J. van Houten, I. van Houten-Groeneveld, T. Gehrels	·	9.8 km (6.1 mi)	MPC · JPL
8596 Alchata	1298 T-2	Alchata	September 29, 1973	Palomar	C. J. van Houten, I. van Houten-Groeneveld, T. Gehrels	·	3.1 km (1.9 mi)	MPC · JPL
8597 Sandvicensis	2045 T-2	Sandvicensis	September 29, 1973	Palomar	C. J. van Houten, I. van Houten-Groeneveld, T. Gehrels	EUN	5.3 km (3.3 mi)	MPC · JPL
8598 Tetrix	2202 T-2	Tetrix	September 29, 1973	Palomar	C. J. van Houten, I. van Houten-Groeneveld, T. Gehrels	THM	9.7 km (6.0 mi)	MPC · JPL
8599 Riparia	2277 T-2	Riparia	September 29, 1973	Palomar	C. J. van Houten, I. van Houten-Groeneveld, T. Gehrels	·	5.4 km (3.4 mi)	MPC · JPL
8600 Arundinaceus	3060 T-2	Arundinaceus	September 30, 1973	Palomar	C. J. van Houten, I. van Houten-Groeneveld, T. Gehrels	NYS	4.4 km (2.7 mi)	MPC · JPL

== 8601–8700 ==
back to top

Designation			Discovery			Properties		Ref
Permanent	Provisional	Named after	Date	Site	Discoverer(s)	Category	Diam.	Ref
8601 Ciconia	3155 T-2	Ciconia	September 30, 1973	Palomar	C. J. van Houten, I. van Houten-Groeneveld, T. Gehrels	HYG	9.1 km (5.7 mi)	MPC · JPL
8602 Oedicnemus	2480 T-3	Oedicnemus	October 16, 1977	Palomar	C. J. van Houten, I. van Houten-Groeneveld, T. Gehrels	·	5.7 km (3.5 mi)	MPC · JPL
8603 Senator	3134 T-3	Senator	October 16, 1977	Palomar	C. J. van Houten, I. van Houten-Groeneveld, T. Gehrels	·	3.0 km (1.9 mi)	MPC · JPL
8604 Vanier	1929 PK	Vanier	August 12, 1929	Mount Hamilton	Krieger, C. J.	·	4.1 km (2.5 mi)	MPC · JPL
8605	1968 OH	—	July 18, 1968	Cerro El Roble	C. Torres, Cofre, S.	EUN	5.6 km (3.5 mi)	MPC · JPL
8606	1971 UG	—	October 26, 1971	Hamburg-Bergedorf	L. Kohoutek	·	9.8 km (6.1 mi)	MPC · JPL
8607	1971 UT	—	October 26, 1971	Hamburg-Bergedorf	L. Kohoutek	·	3.7 km (2.3 mi)	MPC · JPL
8608 Chelomey	1976 YO_{2}	Chelomey	December 16, 1976	Nauchnij	L. I. Chernykh	·	5.3 km (3.3 mi)	MPC · JPL
8609 Shuvalov	1977 QH_{3}	Shuvalov	August 22, 1977	Nauchnij	N. S. Chernykh	·	8.9 km (5.5 mi)	MPC · JPL
8610 Goldhaber	1977 UD	Goldhaber	October 22, 1977	Harvard Observatory	Harvard Observatory	·	7.2 km (4.5 mi)	MPC · JPL
8611 Judithgoldhaber	1977 UM_{4}	Judithgoldhaber	October 18, 1977	Palomar	S. J. Bus	NYS	4.7 km (2.9 mi)	MPC · JPL
8612 Burov	1978 SS_{7}	Burov	September 26, 1978	Nauchnij	L. V. Zhuravleva	ERI	5.2 km (3.2 mi)	MPC · JPL
8613 Cindyschulz	1978 VE_{10}	Cindyschulz	November 7, 1978	Palomar	E. F. Helin, S. J. Bus	·	8.3 km (5.2 mi)	MPC · JPL
8614 Svedhem	1978 VP_{11}	Svedhem	November 7, 1978	Palomar	E. F. Helin, S. J. Bus	THM	13 km (8.1 mi)	MPC · JPL
8615 Philipgrahamgood	1979 MB_{2}	Philipgrahamgood	June 25, 1979	Siding Spring	E. F. Helin, S. J. Bus	slow	5.7 km (3.5 mi)	MPC · JPL
8616 Fogelquist	1980 FY_{4}	Fogelquist	March 16, 1980	La Silla	C.-I. Lagerkvist	·	4.3 km (2.7 mi)	MPC · JPL
8617 Fellous	1980 PW	Fellous	August 6, 1980	Kleť	Z. Vávrová	·	5.1 km (3.2 mi)	MPC · JPL
8618 Sethjacobson	1981 DX	Sethjacobson	February 28, 1981	Siding Spring	S. J. Bus	·	7.9 km (4.9 mi)	MPC · JPL
8619	1981 EH_{1}	—	March 6, 1981	La Silla	H. Debehogne, G. de Sanctis	·	13 km (8.1 mi)	MPC · JPL
8620 Lowkevrudolph	1981 EK_{5}	Lowkevrudolph	March 2, 1981	Siding Spring	S. J. Bus	·	10 km (6.2 mi)	MPC · JPL
8621 Jimparsons	1981 EK_{7}	Jimparsons	March 1, 1981	Siding Spring	S. J. Bus	HYG	9.2 km (5.7 mi)	MPC · JPL
8622 Mayimbialik	1981 EM_{8}	Mayimbialik	March 1, 1981	Siding Spring	S. J. Bus	HYG	9.4 km (5.8 mi)	MPC · JPL
8623 Johnnygalecki	1981 EQ_{9}	Johnnygalecki	March 1, 1981	Siding Spring	S. J. Bus	HYG	8.2 km (5.1 mi)	MPC · JPL
8624 Kaleycuoco	1981 ES_{9}	Kaleycuoco	March 1, 1981	Siding Spring	S. J. Bus	VER	9.5 km (5.9 mi)	MPC · JPL
8625 Simonhelberg	1981 EX_{15}	Simonhelberg	March 1, 1981	Siding Spring	S. J. Bus	·	3.7 km (2.3 mi)	MPC · JPL
8626 Melissarauch	1981 EC_{18}	Melissarauch	March 2, 1981	Siding Spring	S. J. Bus	·	4.3 km (2.7 mi)	MPC · JPL
8627 Kunalnayyar	1981 EU_{20}	Kunalnayyar	March 2, 1981	Siding Spring	S. J. Bus	·	4.5 km (2.8 mi)	MPC · JPL
8628 Davidsaltzberg	1981 EX_{21}	Davidsaltzberg	March 2, 1981	Siding Spring	S. J. Bus	ADE · slow	10 km (6.2 mi)	MPC · JPL
8629 Chucklorre	1981 EU_{26}	Chucklorre	March 2, 1981	Siding Spring	S. J. Bus	HYG	8.0 km (5.0 mi)	MPC · JPL
8630 Billprady	1981 EY_{35}	Billprady	March 2, 1981	Siding Spring	S. J. Bus	·	3.6 km (2.2 mi)	MPC · JPL
8631 Sherikboonstra	1981 EK_{41}	Sherikboonstra	March 2, 1981	Siding Spring	S. J. Bus	·	3.3 km (2.1 mi)	MPC · JPL
8632 Egleston	1981 FR	Egleston	March 28, 1981	Harvard Observatory	Harvard Observatory	EUN	3.8 km (2.4 mi)	MPC · JPL
8633 Keisukenagao	1981 FC_{1}	Keisukenagao	March 16, 1981	Siding Spring	S. J. Bus	·	7.6 km (4.7 mi)	MPC · JPL
8634 Neubauer	1981 GG	Neubauer	April 5, 1981	Anderson Mesa	E. Bowell	·	5.4 km (3.4 mi)	MPC · JPL
8635 Yuriosipov	1985 PG_{2}	Yuriosipov	August 13, 1985	Nauchnij	N. S. Chernykh	NYS	8.6 km (5.3 mi)	MPC · JPL
8636 Malvina	1985 UH_{2}	Malvina	October 17, 1985	Caussols	CERGA	·	4.9 km (3.0 mi)	MPC · JPL
8637	1986 CS_{1}	—	February 6, 1986	La Silla	H. Debehogne	·	6.6 km (4.1 mi)	MPC · JPL
8638	1986 QY	—	August 26, 1986	La Silla	H. Debehogne	MRX	6.1 km (3.8 mi)	MPC · JPL
8639 Vonšovský	1986 VB_{1}	Vonšovský	November 3, 1986	Kleť	A. Mrkos	·	3.0 km (1.9 mi)	MPC · JPL
8640 Ritaschulz	1986 VX_{5}	Ritaschulz	November 6, 1986	Anderson Mesa	E. Bowell	·	6.4 km (4.0 mi)	MPC · JPL
8641	1987 BM_{1}	—	January 27, 1987	Brorfelde	P. Jensen	·	14 km (8.7 mi)	MPC · JPL
8642 Shawnkerry	1988 RZ_{11}	Shawnkerry	September 14, 1988	Cerro Tololo	S. J. Bus	·	10 km (6.2 mi)	MPC · JPL
8643 Quercus	1988 SC	Quercus	September 16, 1988	Haute-Provence	E. W. Elst	EUN	5.8 km (3.6 mi)	MPC · JPL
8644 Betulapendula	1988 SD	Betulapendula	September 16, 1988	Haute Provence	E. W. Elst	·	4.4 km (2.7 mi)	MPC · JPL
8645	1988 TN	—	October 5, 1988	Kushiro	S. Ueda, H. Kaneda	·	5.1 km (3.2 mi)	MPC · JPL
8646	1988 TB_{1}	—	October 13, 1988	Kushiro	S. Ueda, H. Kaneda	·	3.1 km (1.9 mi)	MPC · JPL
8647 Populus	1989 RG	Populus	September 2, 1989	Haute-Provence	E. W. Elst	·	3.9 km (2.4 mi)	MPC · JPL
8648 Salix	1989 RJ	Salix	September 2, 1989	Haute Provence	E. W. Elst	·	4.2 km (2.6 mi)	MPC · JPL
8649 Juglans	1989 SS_{2}	Juglans	September 26, 1989	La Silla	E. W. Elst	·	2.8 km (1.7 mi)	MPC · JPL
8650	1989 TJ_{2}	—	October 5, 1989	Kleť	A. Mrkos	(2076)	4.6 km (2.9 mi)	MPC · JPL
8651 Alineraynal	1989 YU_{5}	Alineraynal	December 29, 1989	Haute-Provence	E. W. Elst	·	3.8 km (2.4 mi)	MPC · JPL
8652 Acacia	1990 EA_{5}	Acacia	March 2, 1990	La Silla	E. W. Elst	NYS	4.1 km (2.5 mi)	MPC · JPL
8653	1990 KE	—	May 20, 1990	Siding Spring	R. H. McNaught	MAR	6.8 km (4.2 mi)	MPC · JPL
8654	1990 KC_{1}	—	May 20, 1990	Siding Spring	R. H. McNaught	EUN	6.3 km (3.9 mi)	MPC · JPL
8655	1990 QJ_{1}	—	August 22, 1990	Palomar	H. E. Holt	·	3.3 km (2.1 mi)	MPC · JPL
8656 Cupressus	1990 QY_{8}	Cupressus	August 16, 1990	La Silla	E. W. Elst	·	8.8 km (5.5 mi)	MPC · JPL
8657 Cedrus	1990 QE_{9}	Cedrus	August 16, 1990	La Silla	E. W. Elst	KOR	5.9 km (3.7 mi)	MPC · JPL
8658	1990 RG_{3}	—	September 14, 1990	Palomar	H. E. Holt	·	5.5 km (3.4 mi)	MPC · JPL
8659	1990 SE_{11}	—	September 17, 1990	Palomar	H. E. Holt	GEF	7.1 km (4.4 mi)	MPC · JPL
8660 Sano	1990 TM_{1}	Sano	October 15, 1990	Kitami	K. Endate, K. Watanabe	·	14 km (8.7 mi)	MPC · JPL
8661 Ratzinger	1990 TA_{13}	Ratzinger	October 14, 1990	Tautenburg Observatory	L. D. Schmadel, F. Börngen	EOS	13 km (8.1 mi)	MPC · JPL
8662	1990 UT_{10}	—	October 22, 1990	Kushiro	S. Ueda, H. Kaneda	·	11 km (6.8 mi)	MPC · JPL
8663 Davidjohnston	1991 DJ_{1}	Davidjohnston	February 18, 1991	Palomar	E. F. Helin	·	4.6 km (2.9 mi)	MPC · JPL
8664 Grigorijrichters	1991 GR_{1}	Grigorijrichters	April 10, 1991	Palomar	E. F. Helin	V	4.2 km (2.6 mi)	MPC · JPL
8665 Daun-Eifel	1991 GA_{9}	Daun-Eifel	April 8, 1991	La Silla	E. W. Elst	·	4.6 km (2.9 mi)	MPC · JPL
8666 Reuter	1991 GG_{10}	Reuter	April 9, 1991	Tautenburg Observatory	F. Börngen	·	3.4 km (2.1 mi)	MPC · JPL
8667 Fontane	1991 GH_{10}	Fontane	April 9, 1991	Tautenburg Observatory	F. Börngen	·	4.2 km (2.6 mi)	MPC · JPL
8668 Satomimura	1991 HM	Satomimura	April 16, 1991	Kiyosato	S. Otomo, O. Muramatsu	slow	6.0 km (3.7 mi)	MPC · JPL
8669	1991 NS_{1}	—	July 13, 1991	Palomar	H. E. Holt	·	3.9 km (2.4 mi)	MPC · JPL
8670	1991 OM_{1}	—	July 18, 1991	La Silla	H. Debehogne	NYS	4.6 km (2.9 mi)	MPC · JPL
8671	1991 PW	—	August 5, 1991	Palomar	H. E. Holt	·	6.2 km (3.9 mi)	MPC · JPL
8672 Morse	1991 PW_{16}	Morse	August 6, 1991	La Silla	E. W. Elst	NYS	2.7 km (1.7 mi)	MPC · JPL
8673	1991 RN_{5}	—	September 13, 1991	Palomar	H. E. Holt	PAD	11 km (6.8 mi)	MPC · JPL
8674	1991 VA_{1}	—	November 4, 1991	Kushiro	S. Ueda, H. Kaneda	·	8.6 km (5.3 mi)	MPC · JPL
8675	1991 YZ	—	December 30, 1991	Kushiro	S. Ueda, H. Kaneda	EOS	10 km (6.2 mi)	MPC · JPL
8676 Lully	1992 CT_{2}	Lully	February 2, 1992	La Silla	E. W. Elst	·	10 km (6.2 mi)	MPC · JPL
8677 Charlier	1992 ES_{5}	Charlier	March 2, 1992	La Silla	UESAC	EOS ·	8.6 km (5.3 mi)	MPC · JPL
8678 Bäl	1992 ER_{6}	Bäl	March 1, 1992	La Silla	UESAC	HYG	9.9 km (6.2 mi)	MPC · JPL
8679 Tingstäde	1992 EG_{8}	Tingstäde	March 2, 1992	La Silla	UESAC	·	9.2 km (5.7 mi)	MPC · JPL
8680 Rone	1992 EJ_{9}	Rone	March 2, 1992	La Silla	UESAC	HYG	10 km (6.2 mi)	MPC · JPL
8681 Burs	1992 EN_{9}	Burs	March 2, 1992	La Silla	UESAC	·	13 km (8.1 mi)	MPC · JPL
8682 Kräklingbo	1992 ER_{9}	Kräklingbo	March 2, 1992	La Silla	UESAC	THM	14 km (8.7 mi)	MPC · JPL
8683 Sjölander	1992 EE_{13}	Sjölander	March 2, 1992	La Silla	UESAC	·	8.7 km (5.4 mi)	MPC · JPL
8684 Reichwein	1992 FO_{3}	Reichwein	March 30, 1992	Tautenburg Observatory	F. Börngen	·	3.1 km (1.9 mi)	MPC · JPL
8685 Fauré	1992 GG_{3}	Fauré	April 4, 1992	La Silla	E. W. Elst	·	3.1 km (1.9 mi)	MPC · JPL
8686 Akenside	1992 OX_{1}	Akenside	July 26, 1992	La Silla	E. W. Elst	·	3.5 km (2.2 mi)	MPC · JPL
8687 Caussols	1992 PV	Caussols	August 8, 1992	Caussols	E. W. Elst	·	3.0 km (1.9 mi)	MPC · JPL
8688 Delaunay	1992 PV_{1}	Delaunay	August 8, 1992	Caussols	E. W. Elst	·	3.6 km (2.2 mi)	MPC · JPL
8689	1992 PU_{3}	—	August 5, 1992	Palomar	H. E. Holt	·	2.8 km (1.7 mi)	MPC · JPL
8690 Swindle	1992 SW_{3}	Swindle	September 24, 1992	Kitt Peak	Spacewatch	MAS	2.2 km (1.4 mi)	MPC · JPL
8691 Etsuko	1992 UZ_{1}	Etsuko	October 21, 1992	Yatsugatake	Y. Kushida, O. Muramatsu	V	4.6 km (2.9 mi)	MPC · JPL
8692	1992 WH	—	November 16, 1992	Kushiro	S. Ueda, H. Kaneda	·	3.8 km (2.4 mi)	MPC · JPL
8693 Matsuki	1992 WH_{1}	Matsuki	November 16, 1992	Kitami	K. Endate, K. Watanabe	·	5.9 km (3.7 mi)	MPC · JPL
8694	1993 CO	—	February 10, 1993	Kushiro	S. Ueda, H. Kaneda	KOR	8.3 km (5.2 mi)	MPC · JPL
8695 Bergvall	1993 FW_{8}	Bergvall	March 17, 1993	La Silla	UESAC	·	4.0 km (2.5 mi)	MPC · JPL
8696 Kjeriksson	1993 FM_{16}	Kjeriksson	March 17, 1993	La Silla	UESAC	HYG	9.2 km (5.7 mi)	MPC · JPL
8697 Olofsson	1993 FT_{23}	Olofsson	March 21, 1993	La Silla	UESAC	THM	9.2 km (5.7 mi)	MPC · JPL
8698 Bertilpettersson	1993 FT_{41}	Bertilpettersson	March 19, 1993	La Silla	UESAC	KOR	7.8 km (4.8 mi)	MPC · JPL
8699	1993 FO_{48}	—	March 19, 1993	La Silla	UESAC	·	5.7 km (3.5 mi)	MPC · JPL
8700 Gevaert	1993 JL_{1}	Gevaert	May 14, 1993	La Silla	E. W. Elst	THM	15 km (9.3 mi)	MPC · JPL

== 8701–8800 ==
back to top

Designation			Discovery			Properties		Ref
Permanent	Provisional	Named after	Date	Site	Discoverer(s)	Category	Diam.	Ref
8701	1993 LG_{2}	—	June 15, 1993	Palomar	H. E. Holt	·	17 km (11 mi)	MPC · JPL
8702 Nakanishi	1993 VX_{3}	Nakanishi	November 14, 1993	Nyukasa	M. Hirasawa, S. Suzuki	·	4.1 km (2.5 mi)	MPC · JPL
8703 Nakanotadao	1993 XP_{1}	Nakanotadao	December 15, 1993	Oizumi	T. Kobayashi	·	4.5 km (2.8 mi)	MPC · JPL
8704 Sadakane	1993 YJ	Sadakane	December 17, 1993	Oizumi	T. Kobayashi	·	1.9 km (1.2 mi)	MPC · JPL
8705	1994 AL_{3}	—	January 8, 1994	Fujieda	Shiozawa, H., T. Urata	V	3.1 km (1.9 mi)	MPC · JPL
8706 Takeyama	1994 CM	Takeyama	February 3, 1994	Oizumi	T. Kobayashi	·	9.6 km (6.0 mi)	MPC · JPL
8707 Arakihiroshi	1994 CE_{2}	Arakihiroshi	February 12, 1994	Oizumi	T. Kobayashi	fast?	5.7 km (3.5 mi)	MPC · JPL
8708	1994 DD	—	February 17, 1994	Kiyosato	S. Otomo	·	11 km (6.8 mi)	MPC · JPL
8709 Kadlu	1994 JF_{1}	Kadlu	May 14, 1994	Palomar	C. S. Shoemaker, E. M. Shoemaker	AMO +1 km (0.62 mi) · (887)	1.4 km (0.87 mi)	MPC · JPL
8710 Hawley	1994 JK_{9}	Hawley	May 15, 1994	Palomar	C. P. de Saint-Aignan	·	11 km (6.8 mi)	MPC · JPL
8711 Lukeasher	1994 LL	Lukeasher	June 5, 1994	Catalina Station	C. W. Hergenrother	·	14 km (8.7 mi)	MPC · JPL
8712 Suzuko	1994 TH_{2}	Suzuko	October 2, 1994	Kitami	K. Endate, K. Watanabe	THM	16 km (9.9 mi)	MPC · JPL
8713 Azusa	1995 BT_{2}	Azusa	January 26, 1995	Kitami	K. Endate, K. Watanabe	·	4.0 km (2.5 mi)	MPC · JPL
8714	1995 OT	—	July 24, 1995	Nachi-Katsuura	Y. Shimizu, T. Urata	·	4.0 km (2.5 mi)	MPC · JPL
8715	1995 OX_{1}	—	July 26, 1995	Nachi-Katsuura	Y. Shimizu, T. Urata	·	4.4 km (2.7 mi)	MPC · JPL
8716 Ginestra	1995 SB_{2}	Ginestra	September 23, 1995	Colleverde	V. S. Casulli	(5651)	9.8 km (6.1 mi)	MPC · JPL
8717 Richviktorov	1995 SN_{29}	Richviktorov	September 26, 1995	Zelenchukskaya	T. V. Krjačko	THM	12 km (7.5 mi)	MPC · JPL
8718	1995 UC_{8}	—	October 27, 1995	Nachi-Katsuura	Y. Shimizu, T. Urata	·	7.2 km (4.5 mi)	MPC · JPL
8719 Vesmír	1995 VR	Vesmír	November 11, 1995	Kleť	Kleť	EUN · slow	6.1 km (3.8 mi)	MPC · JPL
8720 Takamizawa	1995 WE_{1}	Takamizawa	November 16, 1995	Kuma Kogen	A. Nakamura	·	11 km (6.8 mi)	MPC · JPL
8721 AMOS	1996 AO_{3}	AMOS	January 14, 1996	Haleakalā	AMOS	3:2	50 km (31 mi)	MPC · JPL
8722 Schirra	1996 QU_{1}	Schirra	August 19, 1996	Granville	Davis, R. G.	·	4.8 km (3.0 mi)	MPC · JPL
8723 Azumayama	1996 SL_{7}	Azumayama	September 23, 1996	Nanyo	T. Okuni	BAP	3.6 km (2.2 mi)	MPC · JPL
8724 Junkoehara	1996 SK_{8}	Junkoehara	September 17, 1996	Kiyosato	S. Otomo	NYS	5.2 km (3.2 mi)	MPC · JPL
8725 Keiko	1996 TG_{5}	Keiko	October 5, 1996	Yatsuka	H. Abe	·	3.7 km (2.3 mi)	MPC · JPL
8726 Masamotonasu	1996 VP_{5}	Masamotonasu	November 14, 1996	Oizumi	T. Kobayashi	VER	15 km (9.3 mi)	MPC · JPL
8727	1996 VZ_{7}	—	November 3, 1996	Kushiro	S. Ueda, H. Kaneda	·	3.7 km (2.3 mi)	MPC · JPL
8728 Mimatsu	1996 VF_{9}	Mimatsu	November 7, 1996	Kitami	K. Endate, K. Watanabe	NYS	2.8 km (1.7 mi)	MPC · JPL
8729 Descour	1996 VZ_{12}	Descour	November 5, 1996	Kitt Peak	Spacewatch	·	3.3 km (2.1 mi)	MPC · JPL
8730 Iidesan	1996 VT_{30}	Iidesan	November 10, 1996	Nanyo	T. Okuni	NYS	3.4 km (2.1 mi)	MPC · JPL
8731 Tejima	1996 WY	Tejima	November 19, 1996	Oizumi	T. Kobayashi	·	3.0 km (1.9 mi)	MPC · JPL
8732 Champion	1996 XR_{25}	Champion	December 8, 1996	Geisei	T. Seki	·	4.3 km (2.7 mi)	MPC · JPL
8733 Ohsugi	1996 YB_{1}	Ohsugi	December 20, 1996	Oizumi	T. Kobayashi	AGN	5.8 km (3.6 mi)	MPC · JPL
8734 Warner	1997 AA	Warner	January 1, 1997	Prescott	P. G. Comba	·	4.9 km (3.0 mi)	MPC · JPL
8735 Yoshiosakai	1997 AA_{1}	Yoshiosakai	January 2, 1997	Oizumi	T. Kobayashi	THM	13 km (8.1 mi)	MPC · JPL
8736 Shigehisa	1997 AD_{7}	Shigehisa	January 9, 1997	Oizumi	T. Kobayashi	·	3.8 km (2.4 mi)	MPC · JPL
8737 Takehiro	1997 AL_{13}	Takehiro	January 11, 1997	Oizumi	T. Kobayashi	(8737) · slow	18 km (11 mi)	MPC · JPL
8738 Saji	1997 AQ_{16}	Saji	January 5, 1997	Saji	Saji	·	2.6 km (1.6 mi)	MPC · JPL
8739 Morihisa	1997 BE_{3}	Morihisa	January 30, 1997	Oizumi	T. Kobayashi	·	20 km (12 mi)	MPC · JPL
8740 Václav	1998 AS_{8}	Václav	January 12, 1998	Kleť	M. Tichý, Z. Moravec	KOR	5.9 km (3.7 mi)	MPC · JPL
8741 Suzukisuzuko	1998 BR_{8}	Suzukisuzuko	January 25, 1998	Oizumi	T. Kobayashi	EOS	6.7 km (4.2 mi)	MPC · JPL
8742 Bonazzoli	1998 CB_{2}	Bonazzoli	February 14, 1998	Colleverde	V. S. Casulli	slow	4.0 km (2.5 mi)	MPC · JPL
8743 Kèneke	1998 EH_{12}	Kèneke	March 1, 1998	La Silla	E. W. Elst	T_{j} (2.97) · 3:2	30 km (19 mi)	MPC · JPL
8744 Cilla	1998 FE_{59}	Cilla	March 20, 1998	Socorro	LINEAR	THM	12 km (7.5 mi)	MPC · JPL
8745 Delaney	1998 FO_{65}	Delaney	March 20, 1998	Socorro	LINEAR	·	6.0 km (3.7 mi)	MPC · JPL
8746	1998 FL_{68}	—	March 20, 1998	Socorro	LINEAR	HYG	14 km (8.7 mi)	MPC · JPL
8747 Asahi	1998 FS_{73}	Asahi	March 24, 1998	Nanyo	T. Okuni	·	12 km (7.5 mi)	MPC · JPL
8748	1998 FV_{113}	—	March 31, 1998	Socorro	LINEAR	·	4.1 km (2.5 mi)	MPC · JPL
8749 Beatles	1998 GJ_{10}	Beatles	April 3, 1998	Reedy Creek	J. Broughton	·	3.6 km (2.2 mi)	MPC · JPL
8750 Nettarufina	2197 P-L	Nettarufina	September 24, 1960	Palomar	C. J. van Houten, I. van Houten-Groeneveld, T. Gehrels	·	8.0 km (5.0 mi)	MPC · JPL
8751 Nigricollis	2594 P-L	Nigricollis	September 24, 1960	Palomar	C. J. van Houten, I. van Houten-Groeneveld, T. Gehrels	KOR	4.8 km (3.0 mi)	MPC · JPL
8752 Flammeus	2604 P-L	Flammeus	September 24, 1960	Palomar	C. J. van Houten, I. van Houten-Groeneveld, T. Gehrels	·	4.1 km (2.5 mi)	MPC · JPL
8753 Nycticorax	2636 P-L	Nycticorax	September 24, 1960	Palomar	C. J. van Houten, I. van Houten-Groeneveld, T. Gehrels	·	3.5 km (2.2 mi)	MPC · JPL
8754 Leucorodia	4521 P-L	Leucorodia	September 24, 1960	Palomar	C. J. van Houten, I. van Houten-Groeneveld, T. Gehrels	KOR	7.6 km (4.7 mi)	MPC · JPL
8755 Querquedula	4586 P-L	Querquedula	September 24, 1960	Palomar	C. J. van Houten, I. van Houten-Groeneveld, T. Gehrels	·	12 km (7.5 mi)	MPC · JPL
8756 Mollissima	6588 P-L	Mollissima	September 24, 1960	Palomar	C. J. van Houten, I. van Houten-Groeneveld, T. Gehrels	·	11 km (6.8 mi)	MPC · JPL
8757 Cyaneus	6600 P-L	Cyaneus	September 24, 1960	Palomar	C. J. van Houten, I. van Houten-Groeneveld, T. Gehrels	·	2.5 km (1.6 mi)	MPC · JPL
8758 Perdix	6683 P-L	Perdix	September 24, 1960	Palomar	C. J. van Houten, I. van Houten-Groeneveld, T. Gehrels	HYG	8.0 km (5.0 mi)	MPC · JPL
8759 Porzana	7603 P-L	Porzana	October 17, 1960	Palomar	C. J. van Houten, I. van Houten-Groeneveld, T. Gehrels	EUN	5.1 km (3.2 mi)	MPC · JPL
8760 Crex	1081 T-1	Crex	March 25, 1971	Palomar	C. J. van Houten, I. van Houten-Groeneveld, T. Gehrels	·	6.6 km (4.1 mi)	MPC · JPL
8761 Crane	1163 T-1	Crane	March 25, 1971	Palomar	C. J. van Houten, I. van Houten-Groeneveld, T. Gehrels	·	4.8 km (3.0 mi)	MPC · JPL
8762 Hiaticula	3196 T-1	Hiaticula	March 26, 1971	Palomar	C. J. van Houten, I. van Houten-Groeneveld, T. Gehrels	·	10 km (6.2 mi)	MPC · JPL
8763 Pugnax	3271 T-1	Pugnax	March 26, 1971	Palomar	C. J. van Houten, I. van Houten-Groeneveld, T. Gehrels	·	5.1 km (3.2 mi)	MPC · JPL
8764 Gallinago	1109 T-2	Gallinago	September 29, 1973	Palomar	C. J. van Houten, I. van Houten-Groeneveld, T. Gehrels	NYS	3.4 km (2.1 mi)	MPC · JPL
8765 Limosa	1274 T-2	Limosa	September 29, 1973	Palomar	C. J. van Houten, I. van Houten-Groeneveld, T. Gehrels	·	6.6 km (4.1 mi)	MPC · JPL
8766 Niger	1304 T-2	Niger	September 29, 1973	Palomar	C. J. van Houten, I. van Houten-Groeneveld, T. Gehrels	·	11 km (6.8 mi)	MPC · JPL
8767 Commontern	1335 T-2	Commontern	September 29, 1973	Palomar	C. J. van Houten, I. van Houten-Groeneveld, T. Gehrels	THM	7.2 km (4.5 mi)	MPC · JPL
8768 Barnowl	2080 T-2	Barnowl	September 29, 1973	Palomar	C. J. van Houten, I. van Houten-Groeneveld, T. Gehrels	·	4.9 km (3.0 mi)	MPC · JPL
8769 Arctictern	2181 T-2	Arctictern	September 29, 1973	Palomar	C. J. van Houten, I. van Houten-Groeneveld, T. Gehrels	·	6.8 km (4.2 mi)	MPC · JPL
8770 Totanus	3076 T-2	Totanus	September 30, 1973	Palomar	C. J. van Houten, I. van Houten-Groeneveld, T. Gehrels	THM	15 km (9.3 mi)	MPC · JPL
8771 Biarmicus	3187 T-2	Biarmicus	September 30, 1973	Palomar	C. J. van Houten, I. van Houten-Groeneveld, T. Gehrels	·	5.9 km (3.7 mi)	MPC · JPL
8772 Minutus	4254 T-2	Minutus	September 29, 1973	Palomar	C. J. van Houten, I. van Houten-Groeneveld, T. Gehrels	NYS	3.5 km (2.2 mi)	MPC · JPL
8773 Torquilla	5006 T-2	Torquilla	September 25, 1973	Palomar	C. J. van Houten, I. van Houten-Groeneveld, T. Gehrels	LIX	15 km (9.3 mi)	MPC · JPL
8774 Viridis	5162 T-2	Viridis	September 25, 1973	Palomar	C. J. van Houten, I. van Houten-Groeneveld, T. Gehrels	EOS	7.7 km (4.8 mi)	MPC · JPL
8775 Cristata	5490 T-2	Cristata	September 30, 1973	Palomar	C. J. van Houten, I. van Houten-Groeneveld, T. Gehrels	·	2.3 km (1.4 mi)	MPC · JPL
8776 Campestris	2287 T-3	Campestris	October 16, 1977	Palomar	C. J. van Houten, I. van Houten-Groeneveld, T. Gehrels	·	11 km (6.8 mi)	MPC · JPL
8777 Torquata	5016 T-3	Torquata	October 16, 1977	Palomar	C. J. van Houten, I. van Houten-Groeneveld, T. Gehrels	slow	9.7 km (6.0 mi)	MPC · JPL
8778	1931 TD_{3}	—	October 10, 1931	Flagstaff	C. W. Tombaugh	·	9.8 km (6.1 mi)	MPC · JPL
8779	1971 UH_{1}	—	October 26, 1971	Hamburg-Bergedorf	L. Kohoutek	THM	10 km (6.2 mi)	MPC · JPL
8780 Forte	1975 LT	Forte	June 13, 1975	El Leoncito	Cesco, M. R.	·	3.0 km (1.9 mi)	MPC · JPL
8781 Yurka	1976 GA_{2}	Yurka	April 1, 1976	Nauchnij	N. S. Chernykh	·	3.1 km (1.9 mi)	MPC · JPL
8782 Bakhrakh	1976 UG_{2}	Bakhrakh	October 26, 1976	Nauchnij	T. M. Smirnova	NYS ·	9.2 km (5.7 mi)	MPC · JPL
8783 Gopasyuk	1977 EK_{1}	Gopasyuk	March 13, 1977	Nauchnij	N. S. Chernykh	·	4.0 km (2.5 mi)	MPC · JPL
8784	1977 RQ_{19}	—	September 9, 1977	Palomar	C. M. Olmstead	·	2.3 km (1.4 mi)	MPC · JPL
8785 Boltwood	1978 RR_{1}	Boltwood	September 5, 1978	Nauchnij	N. S. Chernykh	·	3.0 km (1.9 mi)	MPC · JPL
8786 Belskaya	1978 RA_{8}	Belskaya	September 2, 1978	La Silla	C.-I. Lagerkvist	·	10 km (6.2 mi)	MPC · JPL
8787 Ignatenko	1978 TL_{4}	Ignatenko	October 4, 1978	Nauchnij	T. M. Smirnova	·	17 km (11 mi)	MPC · JPL
8788 Labeyrie	1978 VP_{2}	Labeyrie	November 1, 1978	Caussols	K. Tomita	·	4.3 km (2.7 mi)	MPC · JPL
8789 Effertz	1978 VZ_{7}	Effertz	November 7, 1978	Palomar	E. F. Helin, S. J. Bus	THM	8.5 km (5.3 mi)	MPC · JPL
8790 Michaelamato	1978 VN_{9}	Michaelamato	November 7, 1978	Palomar	E. F. Helin, S. J. Bus	·	6.1 km (3.8 mi)	MPC · JPL
8791 Donyabradshaw	1978 VG_{11}	Donyabradshaw	November 7, 1978	Palomar	E. F. Helin, S. J. Bus	·	5.1 km (3.2 mi)	MPC · JPL
8792 Christyljohnson	1978 VH_{11}	Christyljohnson	November 7, 1978	Palomar	E. F. Helin, S. J. Bus	·	5.5 km (3.4 mi)	MPC · JPL
8793 Thomasmüller	1979 QX	Thomasmüller	August 22, 1979	La Silla	C.-I. Lagerkvist	·	5.1 km (3.2 mi)	MPC · JPL
8794 Joepatterson	1981 EA_{7}	Joepatterson	March 6, 1981	Siding Spring	S. J. Bus	·	2.9 km (1.8 mi)	MPC · JPL
8795 Dudorov	1981 EO_{9}	Dudorov	March 1, 1981	Siding Spring	S. J. Bus	·	11 km (6.8 mi)	MPC · JPL
8796 Sonnett	1981 EA_{12}	Sonnett	March 7, 1981	Siding Spring	S. J. Bus	·	2.2 km (1.4 mi)	MPC · JPL
8797 Duffard	1981 EU_{18}	Duffard	March 2, 1981	Siding Spring	S. J. Bus	·	8.2 km (5.1 mi)	MPC · JPL
8798 Tarantino	1981 EF_{24}	Tarantino	March 7, 1981	Siding Spring	S. J. Bus	·	6.8 km (4.2 mi)	MPC · JPL
8799 Barnouin	1981 ER_{25}	Barnouin	March 2, 1981	Siding Spring	S. J. Bus	·	3.2 km (2.0 mi)	MPC · JPL
8800 Brophy	1981 EB_{26}	Brophy	March 2, 1981	Siding Spring	S. J. Bus	·	6.6 km (4.1 mi)	MPC · JPL

== 8801–8900 ==
back to top

Designation			Discovery			Properties		Ref
Permanent	Provisional	Named after	Date	Site	Discoverer(s)	Category	Diam.	Ref
8801 Nugent	1981 EQ_{29}	Nugent	March 1, 1981	Siding Spring	S. J. Bus	·	7.4 km (4.6 mi)	MPC · JPL
8802 Negley	1981 EW_{31}	Negley	March 2, 1981	Siding Spring	S. J. Bus	EOS	7.6 km (4.7 mi)	MPC · JPL
8803 Kolyer	1981 EL_{34}	Kolyer	March 2, 1981	Siding Spring	S. J. Bus	·	11 km (6.8 mi)	MPC · JPL
8804 Eliason	1981 JB_{2}	Eliason	May 5, 1981	Palomar	C. S. Shoemaker, E. M. Shoemaker	·	11 km (6.8 mi)	MPC · JPL
8805 Petrpetrov	1981 UM_{11}	Petrpetrov	October 22, 1981	Nauchnij	N. S. Chernykh	·	5.0 km (3.1 mi)	MPC · JPL
8806 Fetisov	1981 UU_{11}	Fetisov	October 22, 1981	Nauchnij	N. S. Chernykh	·	10 km (6.2 mi)	MPC · JPL
8807 Schenk	1981 UD_{23}	Schenk	October 24, 1981	Palomar	S. J. Bus	slow	4.7 km (2.9 mi)	MPC · JPL
8808 Luhmann	1981 UH_{28}	Luhmann	October 24, 1981	Palomar	S. J. Bus	HOF	9.4 km (5.8 mi)	MPC · JPL
8809 Roversimonaco	1981 WE_{1}	Roversimonaco	November 24, 1981	Anderson Mesa	E. Bowell	·	4.9 km (3.0 mi)	MPC · JPL
8810 Johnmcfarland	1982 JM_{1}	Johnmcfarland	May 15, 1982	Palomar	E. F. Helin, E. M. Shoemaker	·	11 km (6.8 mi)	MPC · JPL
8811 Waltherschmadel	1982 UX_{5}	Waltherschmadel	October 20, 1982	Nauchnij	L. G. Karachkina	NEM	8.8 km (5.5 mi)	MPC · JPL
8812 Kravtsov	1982 UY_{6}	Kravtsov	October 20, 1982	Nauchnij	L. G. Karachkina	fast	11 km (6.8 mi)	MPC · JPL
8813 Leviathan	1983 WF_{1}	Leviathan	November 29, 1983	Anderson Mesa	E. Bowell	·	16 km (9.9 mi)	MPC · JPL
8814 Rosseven	1983 XG	Rosseven	December 1, 1983	Anderson Mesa	E. Bowell	HYG · slow	17 km (11 mi)	MPC · JPL
8815 Deanregas	1984 DR	Deanregas	February 23, 1984	La Silla	H. Debehogne	·	4.5 km (2.8 mi)	MPC · JPL
8816 Gamow	1984 YN_{1}	Gamow	December 17, 1984	Nauchnij	L. G. Karachkina	NYS	6.3 km (3.9 mi)	MPC · JPL
8817 Roytraver	1985 JU_{1}	Roytraver	May 13, 1985	Palomar	C. S. Shoemaker, E. M. Shoemaker	(254)	4.5 km (2.8 mi)	MPC · JPL
8818 Hermannbondi	1985 RW_{2}	Hermannbondi	September 5, 1985	La Silla	H. Debehogne	AST	9.4 km (5.8 mi)	MPC · JPL
8819 Chrisbondi	1985 RR_{4}	Chrisbondi	September 14, 1985	La Silla	H. Debehogne	GEF	5.3 km (3.3 mi)	MPC · JPL
8820 Anjandersen	1985 VG	Anjandersen	November 14, 1985	Brorfelde	P. Jensen	·	4.9 km (3.0 mi)	MPC · JPL
8821	1987 DP_{6}	—	February 23, 1987	La Silla	H. Debehogne	·	9.5 km (5.9 mi)	MPC · JPL
8822 Shuryanka	1987 RQ_{2}	Shuryanka	September 1, 1987	Nauchnij	L. G. Karachkina	·	3.7 km (2.3 mi)	MPC · JPL
8823	1987 WS_{3}	—	November 24, 1987	Anderson Mesa	McDonald, S.	slow	11 km (6.8 mi)	MPC · JPL
8824 Genta	1988 BH	Genta	January 18, 1988	Kushiro	Matsuyama, M., K. Watanabe	DOR	11 km (6.8 mi)	MPC · JPL
8825	1988 MF	—	June 16, 1988	Palomar	E. F. Helin	H	2.2 km (1.4 mi)	MPC · JPL
8826 Corneville	1988 PZ_{1}	Corneville	August 13, 1988	Haute-Provence	E. W. Elst	THM	12 km (7.5 mi)	MPC · JPL
8827 Kollwitz	1988 PO_{2}	Kollwitz	August 13, 1988	Tautenburg Observatory	F. Börngen	·	3.6 km (2.2 mi)	MPC · JPL
8828	1988 RC_{7}	—	September 10, 1988	La Silla	H. Debehogne	·	11 km (6.8 mi)	MPC · JPL
8829 Buczkowski	1988 RV_{10}	Buczkowski	September 14, 1988	Cerro Tololo	S. J. Bus	·	14 km (8.7 mi)	MPC · JPL
8830	1988 VZ	—	November 7, 1988	Yatsugatake	Y. Kushida, Inoue, M.	·	20 km (12 mi)	MPC · JPL
8831 Brändström	1989 CO_{5}	Brändström	February 2, 1989	Tautenburg Observatory	F. Börngen	·	5.2 km (3.2 mi)	MPC · JPL
8832 Altenrath	1989 EC_{3}	Altenrath	March 2, 1989	La Silla	E. W. Elst	KON	11 km (6.8 mi)	MPC · JPL
8833 Acer	1989 RW	Acer	September 3, 1989	Haute-Provence	E. W. Elst	·	18 km (11 mi)	MPC · JPL
8834 Anacardium	1989 SX_{2}	Anacardium	September 26, 1989	La Silla	E. W. Elst	HYG	9.9 km (6.2 mi)	MPC · JPL
8835 Annona	1989 SA_{3}	Annona	September 26, 1989	La Silla	E. W. Elst	·	13 km (8.1 mi)	MPC · JPL
8836 Aquifolium	1989 SU_{3}	Aquifolium	September 26, 1989	La Silla	E. W. Elst	EOS	9.4 km (5.8 mi)	MPC · JPL
8837 London	1989 TF_{4}	London	October 7, 1989	La Silla	E. W. Elst	·	2.4 km (1.5 mi)	MPC · JPL
8838	1989 UW_{2}	—	October 29, 1989	Okutama	Hioki, T., N. Kawasato	·	14 km (8.7 mi)	MPC · JPL
8839 Novichkova	1989 UB_{8}	Novichkova	October 24, 1989	Nauchnij	L. I. Chernykh	HYG	12 km (7.5 mi)	MPC · JPL
8840	1989 WT	—	November 20, 1989	Kushiro	S. Ueda, H. Kaneda	·	4.8 km (3.0 mi)	MPC · JPL
8841	1990 EA_{7}	—	March 2, 1990	La Silla	H. Debehogne	·	5.6 km (3.5 mi)	MPC · JPL
8842 Bennetmcinnes	1990 KF	Bennetmcinnes	May 20, 1990	Siding Spring	R. H. McNaught	·	5.4 km (3.4 mi)	MPC · JPL
8843	1990 OH	—	July 22, 1990	Palomar	E. F. Helin	·	6.5 km (4.0 mi)	MPC · JPL
8844	1990 QR_{2}	—	August 24, 1990	Palomar	H. E. Holt	·	14 km (8.7 mi)	MPC · JPL
8845	1990 RD	—	September 14, 1990	Palomar	H. E. Holt	·	12 km (7.5 mi)	MPC · JPL
8846	1990 RK_{7}	—	September 13, 1990	La Silla	H. Debehogne	·	7.4 km (4.6 mi)	MPC · JPL
8847 Huch	1990 TO_{3}	Huch	October 12, 1990	Tautenburg Observatory	F. Börngen, L. D. Schmadel	KOR	6.4 km (4.0 mi)	MPC · JPL
8848	1990 VK_{1}	—	November 12, 1990	Kushiro	S. Ueda, H. Kaneda	·	19 km (12 mi)	MPC · JPL
8849 Brighton	1990 VZ_{4}	Brighton	November 15, 1990	La Silla	E. W. Elst	·	10 km (6.2 mi)	MPC · JPL
8850 Bignonia	1990 VQ_{6}	Bignonia	November 15, 1990	La Silla	E. W. Elst	EOS	9.3 km (5.8 mi)	MPC · JPL
8851 Okudamasataka	1990 XB	Okudamasataka	December 8, 1990	Kani	Y. Mizuno, T. Furuta	EOS	10 km (6.2 mi)	MPC · JPL
8852 Buxus	1991 GG_{6}	Buxus	April 8, 1991	La Silla	E. W. Elst	·	4.6 km (2.9 mi)	MPC · JPL
8853 Gerdlehmann	1991 GC_{10}	Gerdlehmann	April 9, 1991	Tautenburg Observatory	F. Börngen	(1338) (FLO)	2.5 km (1.6 mi)	MPC · JPL
8854	1991 HC	—	April 16, 1991	Uenohara	N. Kawasato	·	3.8 km (2.4 mi)	MPC · JPL
8855 Miwa	1991 JL	Miwa	May 3, 1991	Kiyosato	S. Otomo, O. Muramatsu	·	3.8 km (2.4 mi)	MPC · JPL
8856 Celastrus	1991 LH_{1}	Celastrus	June 6, 1991	La Silla	E. W. Elst	·	4.7 km (2.9 mi)	MPC · JPL
8857 Cercidiphyllum	1991 PA_{7}	Cercidiphyllum	August 6, 1991	La Silla	E. W. Elst	NYS ·	6.5 km (4.0 mi)	MPC · JPL
8858 Cornus	1991 PT_{7}	Cornus	August 6, 1991	La Silla	E. W. Elst	NYS	3.8 km (2.4 mi)	MPC · JPL
8859	1991 PQ_{11}	—	August 9, 1991	Palomar	H. E. Holt	·	6.0 km (3.7 mi)	MPC · JPL
8860 Rohloff	1991 TE_{5}	Rohloff	October 5, 1991	Tautenburg Observatory	L. D. Schmadel, F. Börngen	·	8.9 km (5.5 mi)	MPC · JPL
8861 Jenskandler	1991 TF_{7}	Jenskandler	October 3, 1991	Tautenburg Observatory	F. Börngen, L. D. Schmadel	·	14 km (8.7 mi)	MPC · JPL
8862 Takayukiota	1991 UZ	Takayukiota	October 18, 1991	Kiyosato	S. Otomo	(5)	8.0 km (5.0 mi)	MPC · JPL
8863	1991 UV_{2}	—	October 31, 1991	Kushiro	S. Ueda, H. Kaneda	·	5.5 km (3.4 mi)	MPC · JPL
8864 Aikawa	1991 VU	Aikawa	November 4, 1991	Kani	Y. Mizuno, T. Furuta	·	7.9 km (4.9 mi)	MPC · JPL
8865 Yakiimo	1992 AF	Yakiimo	January 1, 1992	Yakiimo	Natori, A., T. Urata	·	7.6 km (4.7 mi)	MPC · JPL
8866 Tanegashima	1992 BR	Tanegashima	January 26, 1992	Kagoshima	M. Mukai, Takeishi, M.	·	22 km (14 mi)	MPC · JPL
8867 Tubbiolo	1992 BF_{4}	Tubbiolo	January 29, 1992	Kitt Peak	Spacewatch	KOR	5.8 km (3.6 mi)	MPC · JPL
8868 Hjorter	1992 EE_{7}	Hjorter	March 1, 1992	La Silla	UESAC	EOS	8.9 km (5.5 mi)	MPC · JPL
8869 Olausgutho	1992 EE_{11}	Olausgutho	March 6, 1992	La Silla	UESAC	·	9.4 km (5.8 mi)	MPC · JPL
8870 von Zeipel	1992 EQ_{11}	von Zeipel	March 6, 1992	La Silla	UESAC	·	9.5 km (5.9 mi)	MPC · JPL
8871 Svanberg	1992 EA_{22}	Svanberg	March 1, 1992	La Silla	UESAC	·	8.6 km (5.3 mi)	MPC · JPL
8872 Ebenum	1992 GA_{4}	Ebenum	April 4, 1992	La Silla	E. W. Elst	THM	12 km (7.5 mi)	MPC · JPL
8873	1992 UM_{2}	—	October 21, 1992	Kani	Y. Mizuno, T. Furuta	·	4.3 km (2.7 mi)	MPC · JPL
8874 Showashinzan	1992 UY_{3}	Showashinzan	October 26, 1992	Kitami	K. Endate, K. Watanabe	·	3.3 km (2.1 mi)	MPC · JPL
8875 Fernie	1992 UP_{10}	Fernie	October 22, 1992	Palomar	E. Bowell	·	2.8 km (1.7 mi)	MPC · JPL
8876	1992 WU_{3}	—	November 23, 1992	Yatsugatake	Y. Kushida, O. Muramatsu	NYS	5.2 km (3.2 mi)	MPC · JPL
8877 Rentaro	1993 BK_{2}	Rentaro	January 19, 1993	Geisei	T. Seki	·	6.7 km (4.2 mi)	MPC · JPL
8878	1993 FN_{16}	—	March 17, 1993	La Silla	UESAC	AGN	4.6 km (2.9 mi)	MPC · JPL
8879	1993 FN_{20}	—	March 19, 1993	La Silla	UESAC	·	5.1 km (3.2 mi)	MPC · JPL
8880	1993 FT_{33}	—	March 19, 1993	La Silla	UESAC	AGN	5.2 km (3.2 mi)	MPC · JPL
8881 Prialnik	1993 FW_{36}	Prialnik	March 19, 1993	La Silla	UESAC	·	10 km (6.2 mi)	MPC · JPL
8882 Sakaetamura	1994 AP_{2}	Sakaetamura	January 10, 1994	Kitami	K. Endate, K. Watanabe	PHO	6.5 km (4.0 mi)	MPC · JPL
8883 Miyazakihayao	1994 BS_{4}	Miyazakihayao	January 16, 1994	Oizumi	T. Kobayashi	·	3.5 km (2.2 mi)	MPC · JPL
8884	1994 CM_{2}	—	February 12, 1994	Lake Tekapo	A. C. Gilmore, P. M. Kilmartin	·	5.2 km (3.2 mi)	MPC · JPL
8885 Sette	1994 EL_{3}	Sette	March 13, 1994	Cima Ekar	M. Tombelli, V. Goretti	PHO · slow	6.7 km (4.2 mi)	MPC · JPL
8886 Elaeagnus	1994 EG_{6}	Elaeagnus	March 9, 1994	Caussols	E. W. Elst	(883)	3.4 km (2.1 mi)	MPC · JPL
8887 Scheeres	1994 LK_{1}	Scheeres	June 9, 1994	Palomar	E. F. Helin	MAR	7.8 km (4.8 mi)	MPC · JPL
8888 Tartaglia	1994 NT_{1}	Tartaglia	July 8, 1994	Caussols	E. W. Elst	·	14 km (8.7 mi)	MPC · JPL
8889 Mockturtle	1994 OC	Mockturtle	July 31, 1994	Nachi-Katsuura	Y. Shimizu, T. Urata	·	23 km (14 mi)	MPC · JPL
8890 Montaigne	1994 PS_{37}	Montaigne	August 10, 1994	La Silla	E. W. Elst	THM	9.9 km (6.2 mi)	MPC · JPL
8891 Irokawa	1994 RC_{1}	Irokawa	September 1, 1994	Kitami	K. Endate, K. Watanabe	·	16 km (9.9 mi)	MPC · JPL
8892 Kakogawa	1994 RC_{11}	Kakogawa	September 11, 1994	Minami-Oda	M. Sugano, T. Nomura	THM	13 km (8.1 mi)	MPC · JPL
8893	1995 KZ	—	May 23, 1995	Catalina Station	T. B. Spahr	PHO	4.1 km (2.5 mi)	MPC · JPL
8894	1995 PV	—	August 2, 1995	Nachi-Katsuura	Y. Shimizu, T. Urata	·	4.3 km (2.7 mi)	MPC · JPL
8895 Nha	1995 QN	Nha	August 21, 1995	JCPM Sapporo	K. Watanabe	·	4.4 km (2.7 mi)	MPC · JPL
8896	1995 QG_{2}	—	August 24, 1995	Nachi-Katsuura	Y. Shimizu, T. Urata	V	4.6 km (2.9 mi)	MPC · JPL
8897 Defelice	1995 SX	Defelice	September 22, 1995	Stroncone	Santa Lucia	V	3.1 km (1.9 mi)	MPC · JPL
8898 Linnaea	1995 SL_{5}	Linnaea	September 29, 1995	Golden	Emerson, G.	·	3.1 km (1.9 mi)	MPC · JPL
8899 Hughmiller	1995 SX_{29}	Hughmiller	September 22, 1995	Siding Spring	R. H. McNaught	·	5.0 km (3.1 mi)	MPC · JPL
8900 AAVSO	1995 UD_{2}	AAVSO	October 24, 1995	Sudbury	D. di Cicco	·	5.8 km (3.6 mi)	MPC · JPL

== 8901–9000 ==
back to top

Designation			Discovery			Properties		Ref
Permanent	Provisional	Named after	Date	Site	Discoverer(s)	Category	Diam.	Ref
8901	1995 UJ_{4}	—	October 20, 1995	Oizumi	T. Kobayashi	EOS ·	15 km (9.3 mi)	MPC · JPL
8902	1995 UK_{4}	—	October 20, 1995	Oizumi	T. Kobayashi	EOS	10 km (6.2 mi)	MPC · JPL
8903 Paulcruikshank	1995 UB_{7}	Paulcruikshank	October 26, 1995	Nachi-Katsuura	Y. Shimizu, T. Urata	EUN	5.6 km (3.5 mi)	MPC · JPL
8904 Yoshihara	1995 VY	Yoshihara	November 15, 1995	Oizumi	T. Kobayashi	·	4.7 km (2.9 mi)	MPC · JPL
8905 Bankakuko	1995 WJ	Bankakuko	November 16, 1995	Oizumi	T. Kobayashi	(5)	4.1 km (2.5 mi)	MPC · JPL
8906 Yano	1995 WF_{2}	Yano	November 18, 1995	Oizumi	T. Kobayashi	THM	14 km (8.7 mi)	MPC · JPL
8907 Takaji	1995 WM_{5}	Takaji	November 24, 1995	Oizumi	T. Kobayashi	·	6.6 km (4.1 mi)	MPC · JPL
8908	1995 WY_{6}	—	November 18, 1995	Kushiro	S. Ueda, H. Kaneda	EOS	12 km (7.5 mi)	MPC · JPL
8909 Ohnishitaka	1995 WL_{7}	Ohnishitaka	November 27, 1995	Oizumi	T. Kobayashi	·	6.2 km (3.9 mi)	MPC · JPL
8910	1995 WV_{42}	—	November 25, 1995	Kushiro	S. Ueda, H. Kaneda	·	13 km (8.1 mi)	MPC · JPL
8911 Kawaguchijun	1995 YA	Kawaguchijun	December 17, 1995	Oizumi	T. Kobayashi	·	15 km (9.3 mi)	MPC · JPL
8912 Ohshimatake	1995 YN_{1}	Ohshimatake	December 21, 1995	Oizumi	T. Kobayashi	THM	11 km (6.8 mi)	MPC · JPL
8913 Shohinighose	1995 YB_{2}	Shohinighose	December 22, 1995	Haleakalā	NEAT	3:2 · SHU	20 km (12 mi)	MPC · JPL
8914 Nickjames	1995 YP_{2}	Nickjames	December 25, 1995	Stakenbridge	B. G. W. Manning	EOS ·	11 km (6.8 mi)	MPC · JPL
8915 Sawaishujiro	1995 YK_{3}	Sawaishujiro	December 27, 1995	Oizumi	T. Kobayashi	3:2 · slow	30 km (19 mi)	MPC · JPL
8916	1996 CC	—	February 1, 1996	Xinglong	SCAP	·	8.0 km (5.0 mi)	MPC · JPL
8917 Tianjindaxue	1996 EU_{2}	Tianjindaxue	March 9, 1996	Xinglong	SCAP	CYB	37 km (23 mi)	MPC · JPL
8918	1996 OR_{1}	—	July 20, 1996	Xinglong	SCAP	·	4.7 km (2.9 mi)	MPC · JPL
8919 Ouyangziyuan	1996 TU_{13}	Ouyangziyuan	October 9, 1996	Xinglong	SCAP	·	6.4 km (4.0 mi)	MPC · JPL
8920	1996 VZ_{29}	—	November 7, 1996	Kushiro	S. Ueda, H. Kaneda	NYS	3.2 km (2.0 mi)	MPC · JPL
8921	1996 VH_{30}	—	November 7, 1996	Kushiro	S. Ueda, H. Kaneda	·	4.0 km (2.5 mi)	MPC · JPL
8922 Kumanodake	1996 VQ_{30}	Kumanodake	November 10, 1996	Nanyo	T. Okuni	·	4.0 km (2.5 mi)	MPC · JPL
8923 Yamakawa	1996 WQ_{1}	Yamakawa	November 30, 1996	Oizumi	T. Kobayashi	NYS	3.1 km (1.9 mi)	MPC · JPL
8924 Iruma	1996 XA_{32}	Iruma	December 14, 1996	Chichibu	N. Satō	·	4.1 km (2.5 mi)	MPC · JPL
8925 Boattini	1996 XG_{32}	Boattini	December 4, 1996	Cima Ekar	M. Tombelli, U. Munari	·	4.1 km (2.5 mi)	MPC · JPL
8926 Abemasanao	1996 YK	Abemasanao	December 20, 1996	Oizumi	T. Kobayashi	THM	9.9 km (6.2 mi)	MPC · JPL
8927 Ryojiro	1996 YT	Ryojiro	December 20, 1996	Oizumi	T. Kobayashi	NYS	9.1 km (5.7 mi)	MPC · JPL
8928	1996 YH_{2}	—	December 23, 1996	Xinglong	SCAP	·	4.7 km (2.9 mi)	MPC · JPL
8929 Haginoshinji	1996 YQ_{2}	Haginoshinji	December 29, 1996	Oizumi	T. Kobayashi	·	3.4 km (2.1 mi)	MPC · JPL
8930 Kubota	1997 AX_{3}	Kubota	January 6, 1997	Oizumi	T. Kobayashi	·	4.0 km (2.5 mi)	MPC · JPL
8931 Hirokimatsuo	1997 AC_{4}	Hirokimatsuo	January 6, 1997	Oizumi	T. Kobayashi	NYS	7.0 km (4.3 mi)	MPC · JPL
8932 Nagatomo	1997 AR_{4}	Nagatomo	January 6, 1997	Oizumi	T. Kobayashi	KOR	7.4 km (4.6 mi)	MPC · JPL
8933 Kurobe	1997 AU_{6}	Kurobe	January 6, 1997	Chichibu	N. Satō	KOR	6.9 km (4.3 mi)	MPC · JPL
8934 Nishimurajun	1997 AQ_{12}	Nishimurajun	January 10, 1997	Oizumi	T. Kobayashi	·	16 km (9.9 mi)	MPC · JPL
8935 Beccaria	1997 AV_{13}	Beccaria	January 11, 1997	Sormano	P. Sicoli, M. Cavagna	·	3.3 km (2.1 mi)	MPC · JPL
8936 Gianni	1997 AS_{17}	Gianni	January 14, 1997	Farra d'Isonzo	Farra d'Isonzo	·	3.9 km (2.4 mi)	MPC · JPL
8937 Gassan	1997 AK_{19}	Gassan	January 13, 1997	Nanyo	T. Okuni	·	5.6 km (3.5 mi)	MPC · JPL
8938	1997 AF_{21}	—	January 9, 1997	Kushiro	S. Ueda, H. Kaneda	·	3.3 km (2.1 mi)	MPC · JPL
8939 Onodajunjiro	1997 BU_{1}	Onodajunjiro	January 29, 1997	Oizumi	T. Kobayashi	KOR	6.3 km (3.9 mi)	MPC · JPL
8940 Yakushimaru	1997 BA_{2}	Yakushimaru	January 29, 1997	Oizumi	T. Kobayashi	·	7.1 km (4.4 mi)	MPC · JPL
8941 Junsaito	1997 BL_{2}	Junsaito	January 30, 1997	Oizumi	T. Kobayashi	·	18 km (11 mi)	MPC · JPL
8942 Takagi	1997 BR_{2}	Takagi	January 30, 1997	Oizumi	T. Kobayashi	slow	4.3 km (2.7 mi)	MPC · JPL
8943 Stefanozavka	1997 BH_{3}	Stefanozavka	January 30, 1997	Stroncone	A. Vagnozzi	DOR	8.8 km (5.5 mi)	MPC · JPL
8944 Ortigara	1997 BF_{9}	Ortigara	January 30, 1997	Cima Ekar	U. Munari, M. Tombelli	THM	7.6 km (4.7 mi)	MPC · JPL
8945 Cavaradossi	1997 CM	Cavaradossi	February 1, 1997	Prescott	P. G. Comba	·	8.7 km (5.4 mi)	MPC · JPL
8946 Yoshimitsu	1997 CO	Yoshimitsu	February 1, 1997	Oizumi	T. Kobayashi	KOR	8.2 km (5.1 mi)	MPC · JPL
8947 Mizutani	1997 CH_{26}	Mizutani	February 14, 1997	Oizumi	T. Kobayashi	·	8.6 km (5.3 mi)	MPC · JPL
8948	1997 CW_{27}	—	February 6, 1997	Xinglong	SCAP	NYS	4.6 km (2.9 mi)	MPC · JPL
8949	1997 CM_{28}	—	February 13, 1997	Xinglong	SCAP	·	4.9 km (3.0 mi)	MPC · JPL
8950	1997 EG_{46}	—	March 15, 1997	Xinglong	SCAP	fast	14 km (8.7 mi)	MPC · JPL
8951	1997 FO	—	March 19, 1997	Xinglong	SCAP	EOS	12 km (7.5 mi)	MPC · JPL
8952 ODAS	1998 EG_{2}	ODAS	March 2, 1998	Caussols	ODAS	·	4.8 km (3.0 mi)	MPC · JPL
8953	1998 FC_{61}	—	March 20, 1998	Socorro	LINEAR	KOR	5.7 km (3.5 mi)	MPC · JPL
8954 Baral	1998 FK_{62}	Baral	March 20, 1998	Socorro	LINEAR	·	4.9 km (3.0 mi)	MPC · JPL
8955	1998 FR_{79}	—	March 24, 1998	Socorro	LINEAR	·	7.4 km (4.6 mi)	MPC · JPL
8956	1998 FN_{119}	—	March 31, 1998	Socorro	LINEAR	·	5.2 km (3.2 mi)	MPC · JPL
8957 Koujounotsuki	1998 FM_{125}	Koujounotsuki	March 22, 1998	Geisei	T. Seki	·	4.1 km (2.5 mi)	MPC · JPL
8958 Stargazer	1998 FJ_{126}	Stargazer	March 23, 1998	Reedy Creek	J. Broughton	·	6.0 km (3.7 mi)	MPC · JPL
8959 Oenanthe	2550 P-L	Oenanthe	September 24, 1960	Palomar	C. J. van Houten, I. van Houten-Groeneveld, T. Gehrels	·	3.1 km (1.9 mi)	MPC · JPL
8960 Luscinioides	2575 P-L	Luscinioides	September 24, 1960	Palomar	C. J. van Houten, I. van Houten-Groeneveld, T. Gehrels	·	9.5 km (5.9 mi)	MPC · JPL
8961 Schoenobaenus	2702 P-L	Schoenobaenus	September 24, 1960	Palomar	C. J. van Houten, I. van Houten-Groeneveld, T. Gehrels	THM	9.5 km (5.9 mi)	MPC · JPL
8962 Noctua	2771 P-L	Noctua	September 24, 1960	Palomar	C. J. van Houten, I. van Houten-Groeneveld, T. Gehrels	·	17 km (11 mi)	MPC · JPL
8963 Collurio	4651 P-L	Collurio	September 24, 1960	Palomar	C. J. van Houten, I. van Houten-Groeneveld, T. Gehrels	THM	11 km (6.8 mi)	MPC · JPL
8964 Corax	7643 P-L	Corax	October 17, 1960	Palomar	C. J. van Houten, I. van Houten-Groeneveld, T. Gehrels	·	3.0 km (1.9 mi)	MPC · JPL
8965 Citrinella	9511 P-L	Citrinella	October 17, 1960	Palomar	C. J. van Houten, I. van Houten-Groeneveld, T. Gehrels	THM	13 km (8.1 mi)	MPC · JPL
8966 Hortulana	3287 T-1	Hortulana	March 26, 1971	Palomar	C. J. van Houten, I. van Houten-Groeneveld, T. Gehrels	·	8.9 km (5.5 mi)	MPC · JPL
8967 Calandra	4878 T-1	Calandra	May 13, 1971	Palomar	C. J. van Houten, I. van Houten-Groeneveld, T. Gehrels	EOS	8.4 km (5.2 mi)	MPC · JPL
8968 Europaeus	1212 T-2	Europaeus	September 29, 1973	Palomar	C. J. van Houten, I. van Houten-Groeneveld, T. Gehrels	EOS	12 km (7.5 mi)	MPC · JPL
8969 Alexandrinus	1218 T-2	Alexandrinus	September 29, 1973	Palomar	C. J. van Houten, I. van Houten-Groeneveld, T. Gehrels	·	4.2 km (2.6 mi)	MPC · JPL
8970 Islandica	1355 T-2	Islandica	September 29, 1973	Palomar	C. J. van Houten, I. van Houten-Groeneveld, T. Gehrels	THM	9.3 km (5.8 mi)	MPC · JPL
8971 Leucocephala	2256 T-2	Leucocephala	September 29, 1973	Palomar	C. J. van Houten, I. van Houten-Groeneveld, T. Gehrels	THM	11 km (6.8 mi)	MPC · JPL
8972 Sylvatica	2319 T-2	Sylvatica	September 29, 1973	Palomar	C. J. van Houten, I. van Houten-Groeneveld, T. Gehrels	·	2.8 km (1.7 mi)	MPC · JPL
8973 Pratincola	3297 T-2	Pratincola	September 30, 1973	Palomar	C. J. van Houten, I. van Houten-Groeneveld, T. Gehrels	·	4.7 km (2.9 mi)	MPC · JPL
8974 Gregaria	3357 T-2	Gregaria	September 25, 1973	Palomar	C. J. van Houten, I. van Houten-Groeneveld, T. Gehrels	·	2.6 km (1.6 mi)	MPC · JPL
8975 Atthis	4076 T-2	Atthis	September 29, 1973	Palomar	C. J. van Houten, I. van Houten-Groeneveld, T. Gehrels	NYS	4.5 km (2.8 mi)	MPC · JPL
8976 Leucura	4221 T-2	Leucura	September 29, 1973	Palomar	C. J. van Houten, I. van Houten-Groeneveld, T. Gehrels	THM	13 km (8.1 mi)	MPC · JPL
8977 Paludicola	4272 T-2	Paludicola	September 29, 1973	Palomar	C. J. van Houten, I. van Houten-Groeneveld, T. Gehrels	·	2.5 km (1.6 mi)	MPC · JPL
8978 Barbatus	3109 T-3	Barbatus	October 16, 1977	Palomar	C. J. van Houten, I. van Houten-Groeneveld, T. Gehrels	THM	9.1 km (5.7 mi)	MPC · JPL
8979 Clanga	3476 T-3	Clanga	October 16, 1977	Palomar	C. J. van Houten, I. van Houten-Groeneveld, T. Gehrels	·	2.6 km (1.6 mi)	MPC · JPL
8980 Heliaca	4190 T-3	Heliaca	October 16, 1977	Palomar	C. J. van Houten, I. van Houten-Groeneveld, T. Gehrels	DOR	7.3 km (4.5 mi)	MPC · JPL
8981	1964 YJ	—	December 31, 1964	Nanking	Purple Mountain	EOS	10 km (6.2 mi)	MPC · JPL
8982 Oreshek	1973 SQ_{3}	Oreshek	September 25, 1973	Nauchnij	L. V. Zhuravleva	·	6.0 km (3.7 mi)	MPC · JPL
8983 Rayakazakova	1977 ED_{1}	Rayakazakova	March 13, 1977	Nauchnij	N. S. Chernykh	EOS	12 km (7.5 mi)	MPC · JPL
8984 Derevyanko	1977 QD_{3}	Derevyanko	August 22, 1977	Nauchnij	N. S. Chernykh	·	5.3 km (3.3 mi)	MPC · JPL
8985 Tula	1978 PV_{3}	Tula	August 9, 1978	Nauchnij	N. S. Chernykh, L. I. Chernykh	·	3.3 km (2.1 mi)	MPC · JPL
8986 Kineyayasuyo	1978 VN_{2}	Kineyayasuyo	November 1, 1978	Caussols	K. Tomita	THM	11 km (6.8 mi)	MPC · JPL
8987 Cavancuddy	1978 VD_{4}	Cavancuddy	November 7, 1978	Palomar	E. F. Helin, S. J. Bus	·	3.3 km (2.1 mi)	MPC · JPL
8988 Hansenkoharcheck	1979 MA_{4}	Hansenkoharcheck	June 25, 1979	Siding Spring	E. F. Helin, S. J. Bus	CYB	16 km (9.9 mi)	MPC · JPL
8989	1979 XJ	—	December 15, 1979	La Silla	H. Debehogne, Netto, E. R.	·	3.2 km (2.0 mi)	MPC · JPL
8990 Compassion	1980 DN	Compassion	February 19, 1980	Kleť	Kleť	·	17 km (11 mi)	MPC · JPL
8991 Solidarity	1980 PV_{1}	Solidarity	August 6, 1980	La Silla	ESO	·	8.4 km (5.2 mi)	MPC · JPL
8992 Magnanimity	1980 TE_{7}	Magnanimity	October 14, 1980	Nanking	Purple Mountain	·	8.4 km (5.2 mi)	MPC · JPL
8993 Ingstad	1980 UL	Ingstad	October 30, 1980	La Silla	R. M. West	PHO	7.1 km (4.4 mi)	MPC · JPL
8994 Kashkashian	1980 VG	Kashkashian	November 6, 1980	Anderson Mesa	B. A. Skiff	·	6.5 km (4.0 mi)	MPC · JPL
8995 Rachelstevenson	1981 EB_{9}	Rachelstevenson	March 1, 1981	Siding Spring	S. J. Bus	EUN	7.8 km (4.8 mi)	MPC · JPL
8996 Waynedwards	1981 EC_{10}	Waynedwards	March 1, 1981	Siding Spring	S. J. Bus	·	7.3 km (4.5 mi)	MPC · JPL
8997 Davidblewett	1981 ES_{14}	Davidblewett	March 1, 1981	Siding Spring	S. J. Bus	·	6.0 km (3.7 mi)	MPC · JPL
8998 Matthewizawa	1981 EG_{23}	Matthewizawa	March 3, 1981	Siding Spring	S. J. Bus	THM	9.2 km (5.7 mi)	MPC · JPL
8999 Tashadunn	1981 EJ_{28}	Tashadunn	March 2, 1981	Siding Spring	S. J. Bus	·	2.3 km (1.4 mi)	MPC · JPL
9000 Hal	1981 JO	Hal	May 3, 1981	Anderson Mesa	E. Bowell	slow	3.6 km (2.2 mi)	MPC · JPL

back to top

== See also ==
- Meanings of minor-planet names: 8001–9000
