= List of minor planets: 404001–405000 =

The following is a partial list of minor planets, running from minor-planet number 404001 through 405000, inclusive. The primary data for this and other partial lists is based on JPL's "Small-Body Orbital Elements" and data available from the Minor Planet Center. Critical list information is also provided by the MPC, unless otherwise specified from Lowell Observatory. A detailed description of the table's columns and additional sources are given on the main page including a complete list of every page in this series, and a statistical break-up on the dynamical classification of minor planets.

Also see the summary list of all named bodies in numerical and alphabetical order, and the corresponding naming citations for the number range of this particular list. New namings may only be added to this list after official publication, as the preannouncement of names is condemned by the Working Group for Small Bodies Nomenclature of the International Astronomical Union.

Near-Earth obj.	MBA (inner)	MBA (outer)	Centaur
Mars-crosser	MBA (middle)	Jupiter trojan	Trans-Neptunian obj.
Unclassified

== 404001–404100 ==
Designation			Discovery			Properties		Ref
Permanent	Provisional	Named after	Date	Site	Discoverer(s)	Category	Diam.	Ref
404001	2012 BC_{138}	—	December 25, 2005	Kitt Peak	Spacewatch	·	3.5 km	MPC · JPL
404002	2012 BO_{138}	—	October 29, 2005	Mount Lemmon	Mount Lemmon Survey	·	1.8 km	MPC · JPL
404003	2012 BU_{138}	—	November 22, 2005	Kitt Peak	Spacewatch	·	1.8 km	MPC · JPL
404004	2012 BX_{148}	—	January 29, 2012	Kitt Peak	Spacewatch	·	2.9 km	MPC · JPL
404005	2012 BA_{152}	—	December 31, 2000	Kitt Peak	Spacewatch	·	2.7 km	MPC · JPL
404006	2012 BO_{152}	—	February 18, 2008	Mount Lemmon	Mount Lemmon Survey	HNS	1.4 km	MPC · JPL
404007	2012 CB_{2}	—	September 30, 2003	Kitt Peak	Spacewatch	·	2.5 km	MPC · JPL
404008	2012 CC_{2}	—	February 23, 2007	Kitt Peak	Spacewatch	·	2.9 km	MPC · JPL
404009	2012 CT_{7}	—	September 19, 2006	Catalina	CSS	·	1.8 km	MPC · JPL
404010	2012 CU_{7}	—	November 5, 2010	Mount Lemmon	Mount Lemmon Survey	EOS	2.0 km	MPC · JPL
404011	2012 CP_{10}	—	February 23, 2007	Kitt Peak	Spacewatch	·	1.9 km	MPC · JPL
404012	2012 CB_{12}	—	November 28, 2010	Mount Lemmon	Mount Lemmon Survey	HOF	2.8 km	MPC · JPL
404013	2012 CF_{12}	—	September 26, 2009	Kitt Peak	Spacewatch	THM	2.6 km	MPC · JPL
404014	2012 CN_{12}	—	February 21, 2007	Mount Lemmon	Mount Lemmon Survey	EOS	1.8 km	MPC · JPL
404015	2012 CY_{12}	—	March 12, 2007	Kitt Peak	Spacewatch	·	3.5 km	MPC · JPL
404016 Alexandralabenz	2012 CE_{13}	Alexandralabenz	November 16, 2010	Mount Lemmon	Mount Lemmon Survey	·	2.8 km	MPC · JPL
404017	2012 CN_{13}	—	September 25, 2006	Catalina	CSS	·	1.4 km	MPC · JPL
404018	2012 CQ_{14}	—	March 28, 2008	Kitt Peak	Spacewatch	·	1.4 km	MPC · JPL
404019	2012 CG_{15}	—	January 21, 2012	Kitt Peak	Spacewatch	·	2.7 km	MPC · JPL
404020	2012 CM_{16}	—	October 17, 2010	Kitt Peak	Spacewatch	·	2.1 km	MPC · JPL
404021	2012 CY_{17}	—	September 13, 2004	Kitt Peak	Spacewatch	EOS	2.3 km	MPC · JPL
404022	2012 CC_{21}	—	September 25, 2005	Kitt Peak	Spacewatch	HOF	2.4 km	MPC · JPL
404023	2012 CE_{29}	—	March 11, 2008	Siding Spring	SSS	JUN	1.5 km	MPC · JPL
404024	2012 CH_{29}	—	October 19, 2006	Catalina	CSS	·	2.1 km	MPC · JPL
404025	2012 CG_{30}	—	February 17, 2007	Kitt Peak	Spacewatch	EOS	1.8 km	MPC · JPL
404026	2012 CW_{34}	—	January 26, 2012	Mount Lemmon	Mount Lemmon Survey	·	4.1 km	MPC · JPL
404027	2012 CU_{37}	—	January 20, 2012	Kitt Peak	Spacewatch	·	1.9 km	MPC · JPL
404028	2012 CP_{41}	—	September 15, 2010	Catalina	CSS	MAR	1.0 km	MPC · JPL
404029	2012 CU_{42}	—	January 8, 2006	Kitt Peak	Spacewatch	VER	3.1 km	MPC · JPL
404030	2012 CW_{42}	—	March 12, 2007	Kitt Peak	Spacewatch	EOS	2.3 km	MPC · JPL
404031	2012 CG_{43}	—	November 28, 2011	Mount Lemmon	Mount Lemmon Survey	·	1.6 km	MPC · JPL
404032	2012 CR_{44}	—	February 27, 2007	Kitt Peak	Spacewatch	·	2.9 km	MPC · JPL
404033	2012 CF_{45}	—	December 27, 2011	Mount Lemmon	Mount Lemmon Survey	·	3.6 km	MPC · JPL
404034	2012 CT_{45}	—	September 10, 2010	Mount Lemmon	Mount Lemmon Survey	EUN	1.4 km	MPC · JPL
404035	2012 CM_{49}	—	November 20, 2006	Kitt Peak	Spacewatch	NEM	1.8 km	MPC · JPL
404036	2012 CM_{51}	—	February 21, 2007	Kitt Peak	Spacewatch	EOS	2.0 km	MPC · JPL
404037	2012 CU_{52}	—	January 27, 2007	Kitt Peak	Spacewatch	·	1.5 km	MPC · JPL
404038	2012 CQ_{53}	—	December 21, 2000	Kitt Peak	Spacewatch	·	2.2 km	MPC · JPL
404039	2012 DC	—	September 19, 2009	Mount Lemmon	Mount Lemmon Survey	·	3.5 km	MPC · JPL
404040	2012 DO_{1}	—	August 15, 2009	Kitt Peak	Spacewatch	VER	3.0 km	MPC · JPL
404041	2012 DD_{3}	—	January 22, 2006	Mount Lemmon	Mount Lemmon Survey	VER	2.5 km	MPC · JPL
404042	2012 DQ_{5}	—	December 5, 2002	Kitt Peak	Spacewatch	·	1.9 km	MPC · JPL
404043	2012 DV_{5}	—	January 9, 2006	Kitt Peak	Spacewatch	·	2.6 km	MPC · JPL
404044	2012 DA_{6}	—	December 31, 2005	Kitt Peak	Spacewatch	·	2.7 km	MPC · JPL
404045	2012 DB_{7}	—	December 26, 2011	Kitt Peak	Spacewatch	·	2.1 km	MPC · JPL
404046	2012 DC_{7}	—	November 1, 2011	Mount Lemmon	Mount Lemmon Survey	·	3.6 km	MPC · JPL
404047	2012 DB_{8}	—	October 29, 2003	Kitt Peak	Spacewatch	·	1.4 km	MPC · JPL
404048	2012 DY_{8}	—	October 9, 2010	Mount Lemmon	Mount Lemmon Survey	·	1.4 km	MPC · JPL
404049	2012 DR_{9}	—	January 27, 2007	Mount Lemmon	Mount Lemmon Survey	EOS	1.9 km	MPC · JPL
404050	2012 DL_{12}	—	January 30, 2012	Kitt Peak	Spacewatch	EOS	2.0 km	MPC · JPL
404051	2012 DT_{13}	—	March 14, 2007	Mount Lemmon	Mount Lemmon Survey	·	3.7 km	MPC · JPL
404052	2012 DV_{13}	—	September 18, 2010	Mount Lemmon	Mount Lemmon Survey	·	1.6 km	MPC · JPL
404053	2012 DG_{16}	—	December 1, 2010	Kitt Peak	Spacewatch	·	2.9 km	MPC · JPL
404054	2012 DJ_{16}	—	February 3, 2012	Mount Lemmon	Mount Lemmon Survey	EOS	2.4 km	MPC · JPL
404055	2012 DV_{16}	—	October 7, 2004	Kitt Peak	Spacewatch	·	3.0 km	MPC · JPL
404056	2012 DE_{17}	—	July 25, 2010	WISE	WISE	·	3.9 km	MPC · JPL
404057	2012 DO_{23}	—	January 30, 2006	Catalina	CSS	·	4.4 km	MPC · JPL
404058	2012 DX_{26}	—	March 12, 2007	Catalina	CSS	·	3.1 km	MPC · JPL
404059	2012 DD_{27}	—	February 17, 2007	Mount Lemmon	Mount Lemmon Survey	·	2.4 km	MPC · JPL
404060	2012 DJ_{27}	—	January 23, 2006	Kitt Peak	Spacewatch	·	3.5 km	MPC · JPL
404061	2012 DM_{27}	—	September 17, 2009	Kitt Peak	Spacewatch	·	3.2 km	MPC · JPL
404062	2012 DK_{29}	—	August 28, 2005	Kitt Peak	Spacewatch	·	2.0 km	MPC · JPL
404063	2012 DS_{33}	—	February 17, 2007	Mount Lemmon	Mount Lemmon Survey	·	2.4 km	MPC · JPL
404064	2012 DD_{38}	—	December 28, 2005	Kitt Peak	Spacewatch	·	3.1 km	MPC · JPL
404065	2012 DQ_{39}	—	January 18, 2010	WISE	WISE	EOS	2.9 km	MPC · JPL
404066	2012 DT_{43}	—	January 27, 2006	Mount Lemmon	Mount Lemmon Survey	·	3.0 km	MPC · JPL
404067	2012 DC_{50}	—	March 15, 2007	Mount Lemmon	Mount Lemmon Survey	·	3.7 km	MPC · JPL
404068	2012 DN_{59}	—	March 16, 2007	Kitt Peak	Spacewatch	·	2.5 km	MPC · JPL
404069	2012 DF_{60}	—	February 17, 2007	Kitt Peak	Spacewatch	EOS	1.8 km	MPC · JPL
404070	2012 DW_{61}	—	October 15, 2004	Mount Lemmon	Mount Lemmon Survey	·	4.3 km	MPC · JPL
404071	2012 DU_{65}	—	December 4, 2005	Mount Lemmon	Mount Lemmon Survey	THM	2.3 km	MPC · JPL
404072	2012 DF_{67}	—	January 31, 2006	Kitt Peak	Spacewatch	THM	2.4 km	MPC · JPL
404073	2012 DE_{69}	—	July 29, 2010	WISE	WISE	·	2.3 km	MPC · JPL
404074	2012 DH_{71}	—	November 26, 2005	Mount Lemmon	Mount Lemmon Survey	·	2.3 km	MPC · JPL
404075	2012 DJ_{73}	—	January 19, 2012	Kitt Peak	Spacewatch	HYG	2.6 km	MPC · JPL
404076	2012 DM_{79}	—	March 16, 2007	Kitt Peak	Spacewatch	·	3.0 km	MPC · JPL
404077	2012 DV_{81}	—	September 11, 2004	Kitt Peak	Spacewatch	·	2.7 km	MPC · JPL
404078	2012 DT_{83}	—	December 21, 2005	Catalina	CSS	·	1.9 km	MPC · JPL
404079	2012 DL_{88}	—	February 17, 2004	Kitt Peak	Spacewatch	3:2 · SHU	5.4 km	MPC · JPL
404080	2012 DB_{89}	—	September 29, 2009	Mount Lemmon	Mount Lemmon Survey	·	3.6 km	MPC · JPL
404081	2012 DK_{89}	—	December 13, 2010	Mount Lemmon	Mount Lemmon Survey	HYG	3.4 km	MPC · JPL
404082	2012 EN	—	March 9, 2005	Mount Lemmon	Mount Lemmon Survey	·	950 m	MPC · JPL
404083	2012 ER_{1}	—	April 19, 2007	Kitt Peak	Spacewatch	·	3.3 km	MPC · JPL
404084	2012 ES_{1}	—	February 22, 2006	Anderson Mesa	LONEOS	·	3.7 km	MPC · JPL
404085	2012 ET_{4}	—	October 7, 2004	Socorro	LINEAR	·	2.8 km	MPC · JPL
404086	2012 ES_{6}	—	January 26, 2000	Kitt Peak	Spacewatch	THM	2.7 km	MPC · JPL
404087	2012 EN_{7}	—	September 19, 2003	Socorro	LINEAR	·	4.0 km	MPC · JPL
404088	2012 EZ_{10}	—	October 9, 2004	Kitt Peak	Spacewatch	THM	2.6 km	MPC · JPL
404089	2012 FV	—	November 10, 2005	Mount Lemmon	Mount Lemmon Survey	·	2.6 km	MPC · JPL
404090	2012 FP_{5}	—	March 10, 2007	Mount Lemmon	Mount Lemmon Survey	·	1.7 km	MPC · JPL
404091	2012 FO_{9}	—	January 14, 2010	WISE	WISE	·	4.6 km	MPC · JPL
404092	2012 FF_{19}	—	April 22, 2007	Kitt Peak	Spacewatch	·	1.9 km	MPC · JPL
404093	2012 FK_{22}	—	September 3, 1997	Caussols	ODAS	VER	3.2 km	MPC · JPL
404094	2012 FE_{30}	—	December 12, 2004	Kitt Peak	Spacewatch	·	3.3 km	MPC · JPL
404095	2012 FP_{32}	—	December 27, 2005	Kitt Peak	Spacewatch	·	2.9 km	MPC · JPL
404096	2012 FJ_{33}	—	March 12, 2007	Kitt Peak	Spacewatch	·	2.5 km	MPC · JPL
404097	2012 FN_{33}	—	September 6, 2008	Mount Lemmon	Mount Lemmon Survey	·	3.2 km	MPC · JPL
404098	2012 FM_{45}	—	December 28, 2005	Mount Lemmon	Mount Lemmon Survey	THM	2.0 km	MPC · JPL
404099	2012 FE_{46}	—	September 24, 2009	Mount Lemmon	Mount Lemmon Survey	·	2.2 km	MPC · JPL
404100	2012 FK_{50}	—	December 24, 2006	Kitt Peak	Spacewatch	·	1.4 km	MPC · JPL

== 404101–404200 ==
back to top

Designation			Discovery			Properties		Ref
Permanent	Provisional	Named after	Date	Site	Discoverer(s)	Category	Diam.	Ref
404101	2012 FW_{57}	—	January 30, 2006	Kitt Peak	Spacewatch	·	3.6 km	MPC · JPL
404102	2012 FS_{69}	—	November 17, 2010	Mount Lemmon	Mount Lemmon Survey	·	4.3 km	MPC · JPL
404103	2012 FC_{82}	—	April 23, 2007	Mount Lemmon	Mount Lemmon Survey	·	3.1 km	MPC · JPL
404104	2012 GN_{2}	—	September 4, 1999	Kitt Peak	Spacewatch	KOR	1.3 km	MPC · JPL
404105	2012 GX_{20}	—	April 25, 2007	Kitt Peak	Spacewatch	·	2.9 km	MPC · JPL
404106	2012 HX_{36}	—	February 5, 2000	Kitt Peak	Spacewatch	·	3.4 km	MPC · JPL
404107	2012 QW_{35}	—	November 18, 2009	Kitt Peak	Spacewatch	·	640 m	MPC · JPL
404108	2012 SF_{51}	—	May 13, 2010	WISE	WISE	APO +1km	2.9 km	MPC · JPL
404109	2012 UE_{1}	—	May 22, 2003	Kitt Peak	Spacewatch	H	600 m	MPC · JPL
404110	2012 WO_{8}	—	September 22, 2003	Kitt Peak	Spacewatch	·	1.4 km	MPC · JPL
404111	2012 XO_{40}	—	November 19, 2003	Anderson Mesa	LONEOS	·	1.9 km	MPC · JPL
404112	2012 XQ_{83}	—	December 30, 2007	Kitt Peak	Spacewatch	H	420 m	MPC · JPL
404113	2012 XX_{105}	—	January 29, 2006	Catalina	CSS	·	1.5 km	MPC · JPL
404114	2012 XL_{152}	—	February 2, 2006	Anderson Mesa	LONEOS	·	910 m	MPC · JPL
404115	2013 AG	—	June 15, 2010	Siding Spring	SSS	·	2.7 km	MPC · JPL
404116	2013 AV_{17}	—	February 10, 2002	Anderson Mesa	LONEOS	H	730 m	MPC · JPL
404117	2013 AJ_{23}	—	February 20, 2002	Kitt Peak	Spacewatch	·	1.4 km	MPC · JPL
404118	2013 AF_{40}	—	November 1, 2008	Mount Lemmon	Mount Lemmon Survey	·	750 m	MPC · JPL
404119	2013 AA_{42}	—	March 26, 2006	Kitt Peak	Spacewatch	·	1.3 km	MPC · JPL
404120	2013 AZ_{57}	—	February 20, 2006	Mount Lemmon	Mount Lemmon Survey	·	1.1 km	MPC · JPL
404121	2013 AY_{59}	—	February 24, 2006	Mount Lemmon	Mount Lemmon Survey	·	1.4 km	MPC · JPL
404122	2013 AH_{74}	—	April 13, 2005	Catalina	CSS	·	1.2 km	MPC · JPL
404123	2013 AL_{114}	—	June 22, 2006	Kitt Peak	Spacewatch	·	2.0 km	MPC · JPL
404124	2013 AW_{116}	—	September 11, 2007	Kitt Peak	Spacewatch	·	1.2 km	MPC · JPL
404125	2013 AW_{117}	—	February 10, 2002	Socorro	LINEAR	·	1.2 km	MPC · JPL
404126	2013 AM_{128}	—	February 1, 2006	Kitt Peak	Spacewatch	·	770 m	MPC · JPL
404127	2013 AN_{174}	—	May 10, 2005	Mount Lemmon	Mount Lemmon Survey	ADE	1.5 km	MPC · JPL
404128	2013 AS_{182}	—	March 13, 2010	Mount Lemmon	Mount Lemmon Survey	·	1.5 km	MPC · JPL
404129	2013 BN_{8}	—	December 22, 2008	Kitt Peak	Spacewatch	·	1.5 km	MPC · JPL
404130	2013 BF_{28}	—	November 22, 2006	Kitt Peak	Spacewatch	·	3.1 km	MPC · JPL
404131	2013 BD_{30}	—	September 23, 2008	Kitt Peak	Spacewatch	·	580 m	MPC · JPL
404132	2013 BL_{61}	—	January 5, 2013	Kitt Peak	Spacewatch	·	2.8 km	MPC · JPL
404133	2013 BP_{61}	—	December 28, 2005	Mount Lemmon	Mount Lemmon Survey	·	740 m	MPC · JPL
404134	2013 BQ_{62}	—	September 14, 2007	Mount Lemmon	Mount Lemmon Survey	·	1.3 km	MPC · JPL
404135	2013 CH_{2}	—	February 27, 2009	Siding Spring	SSS	·	2.1 km	MPC · JPL
404136	2013 CV_{4}	—	February 1, 2006	Mount Lemmon	Mount Lemmon Survey	·	720 m	MPC · JPL
404137	2013 CX_{9}	—	March 24, 2006	Mount Lemmon	Mount Lemmon Survey	MAS	600 m	MPC · JPL
404138	2013 CM_{10}	—	December 21, 2008	Mount Lemmon	Mount Lemmon Survey	·	1.2 km	MPC · JPL
404139	2013 CP_{16}	—	March 13, 2002	Socorro	LINEAR	·	1.4 km	MPC · JPL
404140	2013 CQ_{17}	—	February 4, 2009	Mount Lemmon	Mount Lemmon Survey	·	980 m	MPC · JPL
404141	2013 CE_{18}	—	November 11, 2001	Kitt Peak	Spacewatch	·	590 m	MPC · JPL
404142	2013 CK_{18}	—	August 28, 2006	Kitt Peak	Spacewatch	EUN	1.1 km	MPC · JPL
404143	2013 CR_{18}	—	October 22, 2008	Kitt Peak	Spacewatch	·	680 m	MPC · JPL
404144	2013 CY_{18}	—	December 30, 2008	Mount Lemmon	Mount Lemmon Survey	MAS	890 m	MPC · JPL
404145	2013 CB_{19}	—	March 1, 2005	Kitt Peak	Spacewatch	·	1.4 km	MPC · JPL
404146	2013 CD_{19}	—	October 26, 2008	Kitt Peak	Spacewatch	·	670 m	MPC · JPL
404147	2013 CF_{24}	—	January 28, 2006	Mount Lemmon	Mount Lemmon Survey	·	1.1 km	MPC · JPL
404148	2013 CK_{29}	—	July 11, 2004	Socorro	LINEAR	·	650 m	MPC · JPL
404149	2013 CR_{30}	—	January 23, 2006	Kitt Peak	Spacewatch	·	730 m	MPC · JPL
404150	2013 CB_{32}	—	March 27, 2003	Campo Imperatore	CINEOS	·	650 m	MPC · JPL
404151	2013 CQ_{33}	—	May 12, 2008	Siding Spring	SSS	T_{j} (2.91)	3.1 km	MPC · JPL
404152	2013 CK_{38}	—	August 24, 2007	Kitt Peak	Spacewatch	·	1.2 km	MPC · JPL
404153	2013 CU_{38}	—	September 24, 2011	Mount Lemmon	Mount Lemmon Survey	·	740 m	MPC · JPL
404154	2013 CS_{44}	—	January 28, 2009	Kitt Peak	Spacewatch	·	1.2 km	MPC · JPL
404155	2013 CF_{46}	—	May 7, 2006	Mount Lemmon	Mount Lemmon Survey	·	1.2 km	MPC · JPL
404156	2013 CS_{46}	—	March 5, 2010	Kitt Peak	Spacewatch	·	640 m	MPC · JPL
404157	2013 CJ_{50}	—	February 29, 2000	Socorro	LINEAR	·	1.0 km	MPC · JPL
404158	2013 CR_{54}	—	March 2, 2006	Kitt Peak	Spacewatch	NYS	860 m	MPC · JPL
404159	2013 CG_{58}	—	February 5, 2013	Kitt Peak	Spacewatch	·	1.1 km	MPC · JPL
404160	2013 CH_{62}	—	January 16, 2009	Kitt Peak	Spacewatch	·	1.0 km	MPC · JPL
404161	2013 CS_{64}	—	December 28, 2005	Mount Lemmon	Mount Lemmon Survey	·	580 m	MPC · JPL
404162	2013 CX_{66}	—	February 3, 2009	Kitt Peak	Spacewatch	·	1.0 km	MPC · JPL
404163	2013 CG_{70}	—	March 16, 2010	WISE	WISE	·	2.0 km	MPC · JPL
404164	2013 CC_{71}	—	January 15, 2008	Kitt Peak	Spacewatch	BRA	1.5 km	MPC · JPL
404165	2013 CP_{75}	—	January 23, 2006	Kitt Peak	Spacewatch	·	880 m	MPC · JPL
404166	2013 CQ_{75}	—	September 17, 2003	Kitt Peak	Spacewatch	·	1.5 km	MPC · JPL
404167	2013 CX_{75}	—	March 5, 2006	Kitt Peak	Spacewatch	·	1.5 km	MPC · JPL
404168	2013 CF_{77}	—	February 22, 2006	Mount Lemmon	Mount Lemmon Survey	NYS	1.0 km	MPC · JPL
404169	2013 CF_{79}	—	January 11, 2000	Kitt Peak	Spacewatch	·	640 m	MPC · JPL
404170	2013 CZ_{79}	—	February 9, 1999	Kitt Peak	Spacewatch	·	820 m	MPC · JPL
404171	2013 CV_{81}	—	November 1, 2008	Mount Lemmon	Mount Lemmon Survey	·	710 m	MPC · JPL
404172	2013 CH_{83}	—	April 24, 2009	Kitt Peak	Spacewatch	·	1.8 km	MPC · JPL
404173	2013 CF_{84}	—	January 16, 2005	Kitt Peak	Spacewatch	·	1.4 km	MPC · JPL
404174	2013 CA_{86}	—	October 25, 2008	Kitt Peak	Spacewatch	·	750 m	MPC · JPL
404175	2013 CL_{86}	—	March 24, 2006	Kitt Peak	Spacewatch	·	960 m	MPC · JPL
404176	2013 CO_{87}	—	March 18, 2010	Kitt Peak	Spacewatch	·	740 m	MPC · JPL
404177	2013 CO_{88}	—	August 27, 2006	Anderson Mesa	LONEOS	H	600 m	MPC · JPL
404178	2013 CC_{90}	—	January 16, 2004	Catalina	CSS	JUN	1.5 km	MPC · JPL
404179	2013 CM_{93}	—	December 29, 2005	Kitt Peak	Spacewatch	·	520 m	MPC · JPL
404180	2013 CG_{98}	—	February 24, 2009	Kitt Peak	Spacewatch	·	1.1 km	MPC · JPL
404181	2013 CL_{100}	—	January 8, 2013	Mount Lemmon	Mount Lemmon Survey	SYL · CYB	3.8 km	MPC · JPL
404182	2013 CZ_{101}	—	March 3, 2005	Kitt Peak	Spacewatch	·	1.0 km	MPC · JPL
404183	2013 CO_{103}	—	April 29, 2003	Socorro	LINEAR	·	860 m	MPC · JPL
404184	2013 CU_{106}	—	July 11, 2004	Socorro	LINEAR	·	730 m	MPC · JPL
404185	2013 CY_{110}	—	September 28, 2011	Mount Lemmon	Mount Lemmon Survey	·	1.3 km	MPC · JPL
404186	2013 CK_{111}	—	October 7, 2004	Kitt Peak	Spacewatch	V	600 m	MPC · JPL
404187	2013 CC_{112}	—	February 7, 2006	Mount Lemmon	Mount Lemmon Survey	·	1.1 km	MPC · JPL
404188	2013 CD_{113}	—	January 30, 2006	Kitt Peak	Spacewatch	·	950 m	MPC · JPL
404189	2013 CE_{113}	—	February 6, 2002	Socorro	LINEAR	·	2.6 km	MPC · JPL
404190	2013 CB_{118}	—	April 9, 2006	Kitt Peak	Spacewatch	·	960 m	MPC · JPL
404191	2013 CC_{118}	—	April 8, 2006	Kitt Peak	Spacewatch	NYS	1.1 km	MPC · JPL
404192	2013 CK_{120}	—	October 28, 2011	Mount Lemmon	Mount Lemmon Survey	V	670 m	MPC · JPL
404193	2013 CY_{122}	—	January 1, 2009	Kitt Peak	Spacewatch	·	1.1 km	MPC · JPL
404194	2013 CH_{123}	—	October 26, 2008	Kitt Peak	Spacewatch	·	630 m	MPC · JPL
404195	2013 CH_{125}	—	October 24, 2011	Mount Lemmon	Mount Lemmon Survey	(2076)	890 m	MPC · JPL
404196	2013 CC_{126}	—	November 30, 2008	Kitt Peak	Spacewatch	·	1.2 km	MPC · JPL
404197	2013 CW_{130}	—	January 17, 2005	Kitt Peak	Spacewatch	·	1.4 km	MPC · JPL
404198	2013 CL_{132}	—	January 19, 2004	Kitt Peak	Spacewatch	JUN	1.1 km	MPC · JPL
404199	2013 CG_{133}	—	January 1, 2008	Kitt Peak	Spacewatch	HOF	2.5 km	MPC · JPL
404200	2013 CH_{133}	—	March 16, 2002	Kitt Peak	Spacewatch	NYS	990 m	MPC · JPL

== 404201–404300 ==
back to top

Designation			Discovery			Properties		Ref
Permanent	Provisional	Named after	Date	Site	Discoverer(s)	Category	Diam.	Ref
404201	2013 CV_{136}	—	February 26, 2009	Kitt Peak	Spacewatch	·	1.2 km	MPC · JPL
404202	2013 CM_{138}	—	September 23, 2011	Kitt Peak	Spacewatch	·	780 m	MPC · JPL
404203	2013 CS_{144}	—	April 6, 1994	Kitt Peak	Spacewatch	·	1.1 km	MPC · JPL
404204	2013 CK_{152}	—	May 11, 2010	Mount Lemmon	Mount Lemmon Survey	V	740 m	MPC · JPL
404205	2013 CS_{156}	—	February 21, 2009	Kitt Peak	Spacewatch	·	1.1 km	MPC · JPL
404206	2013 CH_{159}	—	February 18, 2010	Mount Lemmon	Mount Lemmon Survey	·	830 m	MPC · JPL
404207	2013 CB_{160}	—	September 16, 2003	Kitt Peak	Spacewatch	·	1.3 km	MPC · JPL
404208	2013 CL_{162}	—	February 20, 2009	Kitt Peak	Spacewatch	·	1.2 km	MPC · JPL
404209	2013 CQ_{162}	—	January 28, 2006	Mount Lemmon	Mount Lemmon Survey	·	1.0 km	MPC · JPL
404210	2013 CU_{163}	—	March 13, 2005	Mount Lemmon	Mount Lemmon Survey	·	1.3 km	MPC · JPL
404211	2013 CE_{166}	—	December 2, 2008	Mount Lemmon	Mount Lemmon Survey	NYS	1.2 km	MPC · JPL
404212	2013 CM_{169}	—	January 28, 2006	Kitt Peak	Spacewatch	V	760 m	MPC · JPL
404213	2013 CR_{169}	—	April 11, 2010	Mount Lemmon	Mount Lemmon Survey	·	790 m	MPC · JPL
404214	2013 CX_{170}	—	March 14, 2000	Kitt Peak	Spacewatch	·	650 m	MPC · JPL
404215	2013 CM_{172}	—	March 3, 2006	Kitt Peak	Spacewatch	V	660 m	MPC · JPL
404216	2013 CT_{174}	—	September 29, 2008	Mount Lemmon	Mount Lemmon Survey	·	860 m	MPC · JPL
404217	2013 CC_{181}	—	December 14, 2001	Socorro	LINEAR	·	960 m	MPC · JPL
404218	2013 CT_{183}	—	February 15, 2009	Catalina	CSS	EUN	1.2 km	MPC · JPL
404219	2013 CR_{184}	—	June 10, 2010	WISE	WISE	·	3.9 km	MPC · JPL
404220	2013 CG_{187}	—	March 12, 2005	Socorro	LINEAR	·	1.0 km	MPC · JPL
404221	2013 CZ_{187}	—	October 1, 2005	Kitt Peak	Spacewatch	·	740 m	MPC · JPL
404222	2013 CJ_{200}	—	December 30, 2005	Kitt Peak	Spacewatch	·	680 m	MPC · JPL
404223	2013 CY_{203}	—	May 10, 2003	Kitt Peak	Spacewatch	V	570 m	MPC · JPL
404224	2013 CX_{206}	—	September 21, 2011	Catalina	CSS	·	1.5 km	MPC · JPL
404225	2013 CS_{208}	—	January 1, 2009	Kitt Peak	Spacewatch	·	950 m	MPC · JPL
404226	2013 CM_{222}	—	April 19, 2009	Mount Lemmon	Mount Lemmon Survey	MIS	2.0 km	MPC · JPL
404227	2013 DB_{5}	—	March 23, 2006	Catalina	CSS	·	940 m	MPC · JPL
404228	2013 DF_{6}	—	October 12, 2007	Mount Lemmon	Mount Lemmon Survey	·	1.0 km	MPC · JPL
404229	2013 DM_{7}	—	January 26, 2009	Mount Lemmon	Mount Lemmon Survey	·	770 m	MPC · JPL
404230	2013 EF_{2}	—	December 25, 2005	Mount Lemmon	Mount Lemmon Survey	·	710 m	MPC · JPL
404231	2013 EF_{3}	—	January 25, 2009	Kitt Peak	Spacewatch	·	790 m	MPC · JPL
404232	2013 EZ_{3}	—	December 18, 2001	Kitt Peak	Spacewatch	·	1.1 km	MPC · JPL
404233	2013 EM_{4}	—	February 20, 2009	Catalina	CSS	EUN	1.4 km	MPC · JPL
404234	2013 EF_{5}	—	August 13, 2010	Kitt Peak	Spacewatch	·	1.7 km	MPC · JPL
404235	2013 EH_{5}	—	February 28, 2009	Mount Lemmon	Mount Lemmon Survey	NYS	1.1 km	MPC · JPL
404236	2013 EH_{6}	—	September 13, 2007	Kitt Peak	Spacewatch	NYS	930 m	MPC · JPL
404237	2013 EF_{7}	—	September 21, 2003	Kitt Peak	Spacewatch	NYS	1.2 km	MPC · JPL
404238	2013 EK_{7}	—	August 23, 2007	Kitt Peak	Spacewatch	·	810 m	MPC · JPL
404239	2013 EV_{7}	—	April 24, 2006	Kitt Peak	Spacewatch	·	1.1 km	MPC · JPL
404240	2013 EK_{9}	—	August 18, 2009	Kitt Peak	Spacewatch	·	1.7 km	MPC · JPL
404241	2013 ER_{9}	—	June 3, 2005	Kitt Peak	Spacewatch	·	1.7 km	MPC · JPL
404242	2013 ES_{10}	—	February 2, 2000	Socorro	LINEAR	·	1.8 km	MPC · JPL
404243	2013 EA_{11}	—	September 11, 2007	Catalina	CSS	·	1.4 km	MPC · JPL
404244	2013 EY_{11}	—	December 22, 2008	Mount Lemmon	Mount Lemmon Survey	·	990 m	MPC · JPL
404245	2013 EA_{15}	—	October 29, 2008	Kitt Peak	Spacewatch	·	580 m	MPC · JPL
404246	2013 ES_{17}	—	November 11, 2006	Mount Lemmon	Mount Lemmon Survey	·	2.1 km	MPC · JPL
404247	2013 ET_{28}	—	October 20, 2006	Mount Lemmon	Mount Lemmon Survey	·	3.0 km	MPC · JPL
404248	2013 EW_{29}	—	April 5, 2000	Socorro	LINEAR	·	2.2 km	MPC · JPL
404249	2013 EZ_{29}	—	March 1, 2009	Kitt Peak	Spacewatch	·	4.0 km	MPC · JPL
404250	2013 EK_{30}	—	September 7, 2004	Kitt Peak	Spacewatch	·	1 km	MPC · JPL
404251	2013 EO_{31}	—	May 8, 2005	Mount Lemmon	Mount Lemmon Survey	·	1.5 km	MPC · JPL
404252	2013 EX_{31}	—	November 27, 2006	Kitt Peak	Spacewatch	·	2.0 km	MPC · JPL
404253	2013 EY_{31}	—	May 11, 2005	Catalina	CSS	KRM	2.8 km	MPC · JPL
404254	2013 EF_{33}	—	September 11, 2010	Mount Lemmon	Mount Lemmon Survey	EUN	1.5 km	MPC · JPL
404255	2013 EV_{33}	—	September 18, 2003	Kitt Peak	Spacewatch	·	1.7 km	MPC · JPL
404256	2013 EY_{33}	—	October 18, 2003	Kitt Peak	Spacewatch	·	1.4 km	MPC · JPL
404257	2013 EQ_{34}	—	March 24, 2001	Kitt Peak	Spacewatch	·	1.2 km	MPC · JPL
404258	2013 ER_{34}	—	April 5, 2000	Socorro	LINEAR	·	1.7 km	MPC · JPL
404259	2013 EO_{37}	—	April 11, 2003	Kitt Peak	Spacewatch	·	710 m	MPC · JPL
404260	2013 ES_{38}	—	January 10, 2007	Mount Lemmon	Mount Lemmon Survey	·	3.7 km	MPC · JPL
404261	2013 EL_{44}	—	September 13, 1998	Kitt Peak	Spacewatch	·	600 m	MPC · JPL
404262	2013 EP_{45}	—	March 3, 2005	Kitt Peak	Spacewatch	·	2.1 km	MPC · JPL
404263	2013 EC_{46}	—	August 30, 2005	Kitt Peak	Spacewatch	·	2.1 km	MPC · JPL
404264	2013 EV_{50}	—	September 7, 2004	Kitt Peak	Spacewatch	·	600 m	MPC · JPL
404265	2013 EL_{67}	—	May 10, 2005	Kitt Peak	Spacewatch	·	1.2 km	MPC · JPL
404266	2013 EY_{68}	—	March 27, 2008	Kitt Peak	Spacewatch	·	1.7 km	MPC · JPL
404267	2013 EG_{74}	—	November 2, 2007	Kitt Peak	Spacewatch	·	1.4 km	MPC · JPL
404268	2013 EJ_{79}	—	March 18, 2004	Kitt Peak	Spacewatch	·	1.8 km	MPC · JPL
404269	2013 EY_{80}	—	December 24, 2005	Kitt Peak	Spacewatch	·	720 m	MPC · JPL
404270	2013 EP_{82}	—	March 21, 2009	Catalina	CSS	·	1.3 km	MPC · JPL
404271	2013 EQ_{83}	—	April 5, 2000	Kitt Peak	Spacewatch	·	1.3 km	MPC · JPL
404272	2013 ES_{84}	—	April 25, 2006	Mount Lemmon	Mount Lemmon Survey	·	1.4 km	MPC · JPL
404273	2013 EX_{85}	—	December 27, 2011	Mount Lemmon	Mount Lemmon Survey	3:2	5.5 km	MPC · JPL
404274	2013 EA_{87}	—	April 27, 2009	Mount Lemmon	Mount Lemmon Survey	·	1.7 km	MPC · JPL
404275	2013 EV_{87}	—	January 17, 2007	Kitt Peak	Spacewatch	·	2.7 km	MPC · JPL
404276	2013 EE_{88}	—	November 24, 2011	Mount Lemmon	Mount Lemmon Survey	·	1.9 km	MPC · JPL
404277	2013 EH_{88}	—	April 2, 2006	Catalina	CSS	·	1.4 km	MPC · JPL
404278	2013 ET_{88}	—	June 19, 2010	Mount Lemmon	Mount Lemmon Survey	·	1.2 km	MPC · JPL
404279	2013 EN_{90}	—	October 20, 2011	Mount Lemmon	Mount Lemmon Survey	·	1.4 km	MPC · JPL
404280	2013 EL_{91}	—	December 5, 2008	Kitt Peak	Spacewatch	·	1.1 km	MPC · JPL
404281	2013 EQ_{91}	—	May 23, 2006	Kitt Peak	Spacewatch	·	1.4 km	MPC · JPL
404282	2013 EH_{92}	—	February 25, 2006	Kitt Peak	Spacewatch	·	1.2 km	MPC · JPL
404283	2013 EQ_{97}	—	February 22, 2004	Kitt Peak	Spacewatch	·	1.5 km	MPC · JPL
404284	2013 EX_{97}	—	April 15, 2001	Kitt Peak	Spacewatch	·	990 m	MPC · JPL
404285	2013 EZ_{101}	—	April 12, 2008	Mount Lemmon	Mount Lemmon Survey	·	2.2 km	MPC · JPL
404286	2013 EL_{102}	—	March 18, 2004	Kitt Peak	Spacewatch	·	1.8 km	MPC · JPL
404287	2013 EC_{103}	—	December 27, 2011	Kitt Peak	Spacewatch	·	2.5 km	MPC · JPL
404288	2013 EM_{105}	—	April 29, 2006	Kitt Peak	Spacewatch	V	550 m	MPC · JPL
404289	2013 EN_{106}	—	October 3, 2006	Mount Lemmon	Mount Lemmon Survey	·	1.8 km	MPC · JPL
404290	2013 EY_{106}	—	May 7, 2005	Kitt Peak	Spacewatch	·	2.0 km	MPC · JPL
404291	2013 ED_{107}	—	November 18, 2007	Mount Lemmon	Mount Lemmon Survey	·	1.4 km	MPC · JPL
404292	2013 EO_{107}	—	May 3, 1997	Kitt Peak	Spacewatch	·	1.2 km	MPC · JPL
404293	2013 EM_{108}	—	December 13, 2006	Kitt Peak	Spacewatch	EOS	2.1 km	MPC · JPL
404294	2013 EH_{109}	—	December 12, 2006	Kitt Peak	Spacewatch	AGN	1.4 km	MPC · JPL
404295	2013 EL_{109}	—	September 20, 1998	Kitt Peak	Spacewatch	·	1.5 km	MPC · JPL
404296	2013 EC_{110}	—	April 28, 2004	Kitt Peak	Spacewatch	·	1.4 km	MPC · JPL
404297	2013 EQ_{111}	—	October 22, 2006	Kitt Peak	Spacewatch	AGN	1.4 km	MPC · JPL
404298	2013 EP_{113}	—	February 15, 2004	Socorro	LINEAR	·	1.6 km	MPC · JPL
404299	2013 ET_{113}	—	November 7, 2007	Kitt Peak	Spacewatch	·	1.2 km	MPC · JPL
404300	2013 EV_{113}	—	January 1, 2009	Kitt Peak	Spacewatch	V	750 m	MPC · JPL

== 404301–404400 ==
back to top

Designation			Discovery			Properties		Ref
Permanent	Provisional	Named after	Date	Site	Discoverer(s)	Category	Diam.	Ref
404301	2013 EE_{115}	—	February 24, 2006	Mount Lemmon	Mount Lemmon Survey	MAS	770 m	MPC · JPL
404302	2013 EZ_{115}	—	April 26, 2000	Kitt Peak	Spacewatch	NEM	1.8 km	MPC · JPL
404303	2013 EH_{119}	—	October 7, 1999	Kitt Peak	Spacewatch	·	1.7 km	MPC · JPL
404304	2013 EF_{120}	—	February 9, 2008	Mount Lemmon	Mount Lemmon Survey	·	1.7 km	MPC · JPL
404305	2013 EV_{120}	—	October 7, 2004	Kitt Peak	Spacewatch	·	820 m	MPC · JPL
404306	2013 EC_{121}	—	December 21, 2008	Kitt Peak	Spacewatch	·	810 m	MPC · JPL
404307	2013 EJ_{121}	—	October 21, 2006	Mount Lemmon	Mount Lemmon Survey	·	1.8 km	MPC · JPL
404308	2013 EV_{122}	—	September 3, 1999	Kitt Peak	Spacewatch	·	1.9 km	MPC · JPL
404309	2013 EJ_{123}	—	April 25, 2003	Kitt Peak	Spacewatch	·	760 m	MPC · JPL
404310	2013 EY_{124}	—	October 27, 2005	Mount Lemmon	Mount Lemmon Survey	·	1.8 km	MPC · JPL
404311	2013 EQ_{126}	—	May 14, 2004	Kitt Peak	Spacewatch	·	2.6 km	MPC · JPL
404312	2013 EN_{127}	—	February 3, 2009	Kitt Peak	Spacewatch	·	1.1 km	MPC · JPL
404313	2013 EQ_{127}	—	September 28, 2006	Kitt Peak	Spacewatch	·	1.4 km	MPC · JPL
404314	2013 ET_{127}	—	February 27, 2009	Siding Spring	SSS	EUN	1.6 km	MPC · JPL
404315	2013 EG_{134}	—	November 17, 2006	Mount Lemmon	Mount Lemmon Survey	·	1.5 km	MPC · JPL
404316	2013 FA_{2}	—	May 9, 2004	Kitt Peak	Spacewatch	·	1.1 km	MPC · JPL
404317	2013 FU_{2}	—	February 2, 2009	Mount Lemmon	Mount Lemmon Survey	PHO	1.2 km	MPC · JPL
404318	2013 FH_{4}	—	November 4, 2007	Kitt Peak	Spacewatch	·	1.6 km	MPC · JPL
404319	2013 FP_{5}	—	April 25, 2006	Kitt Peak	Spacewatch	·	1.4 km	MPC · JPL
404320	2013 FH_{7}	—	September 30, 2010	Mount Lemmon	Mount Lemmon Survey	MRX	1.3 km	MPC · JPL
404321	2013 FT_{9}	—	January 20, 2009	Catalina	CSS	·	1.3 km	MPC · JPL
404322	2013 FN_{10}	—	May 19, 2006	Mount Lemmon	Mount Lemmon Survey	MAS	940 m	MPC · JPL
404323	2013 FY_{11}	—	March 21, 2004	Kitt Peak	Spacewatch	DOR	2.4 km	MPC · JPL
404324	2013 FH_{12}	—	December 31, 2008	Mount Lemmon	Mount Lemmon Survey	V	720 m	MPC · JPL
404325	2013 FR_{12}	—	March 10, 2005	Anderson Mesa	LONEOS	·	1.4 km	MPC · JPL
404326	2013 FA_{13}	—	April 20, 2009	Catalina	CSS	·	1.3 km	MPC · JPL
404327	2013 FY_{14}	—	April 16, 2005	Catalina	CSS	·	1.5 km	MPC · JPL
404328	2013 FZ_{16}	—	April 30, 2006	Kitt Peak	Spacewatch	·	1.1 km	MPC · JPL
404329	2013 FD_{17}	—	January 17, 2009	Kitt Peak	Spacewatch	V	680 m	MPC · JPL
404330	2013 FP_{17}	—	April 6, 2008	Kitt Peak	Spacewatch	·	1.6 km	MPC · JPL
404331	2013 FY_{18}	—	October 10, 2007	Mount Lemmon	Mount Lemmon Survey	·	1.2 km	MPC · JPL
404332	2013 FA_{19}	—	October 2, 2006	Mount Lemmon	Mount Lemmon Survey	·	1.6 km	MPC · JPL
404333	2013 FD_{20}	—	June 1, 2003	Kitt Peak	Spacewatch	V	650 m	MPC · JPL
404334	2013 FR_{20}	—	September 13, 2005	Kitt Peak	Spacewatch	DOR	2.1 km	MPC · JPL
404335	2013 FT_{20}	—	September 18, 2010	Mount Lemmon	Mount Lemmon Survey	NEM	2.3 km	MPC · JPL
404336	2013 FW_{20}	—	March 24, 2006	Mount Lemmon	Mount Lemmon Survey	V	530 m	MPC · JPL
404337	2013 FX_{20}	—	November 14, 2006	Kitt Peak	Spacewatch	·	1.6 km	MPC · JPL
404338	2013 FZ_{20}	—	April 17, 2005	Kitt Peak	Spacewatch	·	990 m	MPC · JPL
404339	2013 FB_{21}	—	February 28, 2008	Mount Lemmon	Mount Lemmon Survey	·	1.8 km	MPC · JPL
404340	2013 FN_{21}	—	September 22, 2001	Kitt Peak	Spacewatch	·	690 m	MPC · JPL
404341	2013 FW_{22}	—	January 23, 2006	Kitt Peak	Spacewatch	·	840 m	MPC · JPL
404342	2013 FO_{23}	—	August 27, 2009	Kitt Peak	Spacewatch	THM	2.3 km	MPC · JPL
404343	2013 FN_{24}	—	April 12, 2002	Kitt Peak	Spacewatch	THM	2.3 km	MPC · JPL
404344	2013 FP_{24}	—	March 12, 2013	Kitt Peak	Spacewatch	·	1.8 km	MPC · JPL
404345	2013 FT_{26}	—	December 10, 2006	Kitt Peak	Spacewatch	HOF	2.6 km	MPC · JPL
404346	2013 GW_{1}	—	October 13, 2006	Kitt Peak	Spacewatch	·	1.3 km	MPC · JPL
404347	2013 GV_{3}	—	March 19, 2004	Kitt Peak	Spacewatch	·	1.4 km	MPC · JPL
404348	2013 GK_{4}	—	March 23, 2003	Kitt Peak	Spacewatch	·	810 m	MPC · JPL
404349	2013 GW_{6}	—	March 6, 1999	Kitt Peak	Spacewatch	GAL	1.7 km	MPC · JPL
404350	2013 GO_{7}	—	October 1, 2000	Socorro	LINEAR	·	2.5 km	MPC · JPL
404351	2013 GH_{9}	—	March 17, 2004	Kitt Peak	Spacewatch	·	1.4 km	MPC · JPL
404352	2013 GR_{10}	—	September 29, 2005	Mount Lemmon	Mount Lemmon Survey	·	2.0 km	MPC · JPL
404353	2013 GL_{11}	—	December 3, 2004	Kitt Peak	Spacewatch	·	1.2 km	MPC · JPL
404354	2013 GV_{11}	—	January 19, 2005	Kitt Peak	Spacewatch	NYS	1.2 km	MPC · JPL
404355	2013 GH_{12}	—	March 26, 2006	Kitt Peak	Spacewatch	·	980 m	MPC · JPL
404356	2013 GP_{14}	—	May 1, 2009	Kitt Peak	Spacewatch	·	1.6 km	MPC · JPL
404357	2013 GT_{15}	—	January 17, 2005	Kitt Peak	Spacewatch	·	1.1 km	MPC · JPL
404358	2013 GS_{17}	—	February 9, 2007	Kitt Peak	Spacewatch	T_{j} (2.98)	3.0 km	MPC · JPL
404359	2013 GP_{19}	—	September 10, 2007	Mount Lemmon	Mount Lemmon Survey	V	590 m	MPC · JPL
404360	2013 GL_{20}	—	September 4, 2007	Catalina	CSS	·	990 m	MPC · JPL
404361	2013 GP_{20}	—	February 1, 2006	Mount Lemmon	Mount Lemmon Survey	·	680 m	MPC · JPL
404362	2013 GT_{20}	—	February 2, 2008	Kitt Peak	Spacewatch	·	2.4 km	MPC · JPL
404363	2013 GW_{20}	—	February 13, 2004	Kitt Peak	Spacewatch	·	1.6 km	MPC · JPL
404364	2013 GX_{20}	—	February 13, 2008	Kitt Peak	Spacewatch	·	1.6 km	MPC · JPL
404365	2013 GJ_{21}	—	October 23, 2006	Kitt Peak	Spacewatch	·	1.7 km	MPC · JPL
404366	2013 GA_{22}	—	February 25, 2007	Kitt Peak	Spacewatch	THM	2.3 km	MPC · JPL
404367	2013 GN_{22}	—	October 13, 1998	Kitt Peak	Spacewatch	·	1.3 km	MPC · JPL
404368	2013 GM_{25}	—	September 28, 1997	Kitt Peak	Spacewatch	·	1.4 km	MPC · JPL
404369	2013 GC_{26}	—	February 10, 2002	Socorro	LINEAR	V	740 m	MPC · JPL
404370	2013 GD_{26}	—	September 5, 2010	Mount Lemmon	Mount Lemmon Survey	·	1.4 km	MPC · JPL
404371	2013 GF_{26}	—	March 31, 2009	Mount Lemmon	Mount Lemmon Survey	·	980 m	MPC · JPL
404372	2013 GO_{26}	—	April 18, 2009	Mount Lemmon	Mount Lemmon Survey	·	1.2 km	MPC · JPL
404373	2013 GL_{27}	—	July 31, 2005	Palomar	NEAT	EUN	1.3 km	MPC · JPL
404374	2013 GF_{29}	—	April 15, 2005	Catalina	CSS	EUN	1.5 km	MPC · JPL
404375	2013 GR_{29}	—	November 25, 2000	Kitt Peak	Spacewatch	V	660 m	MPC · JPL
404376	2013 GC_{31}	—	March 10, 2005	Mount Lemmon	Mount Lemmon Survey	·	1.6 km	MPC · JPL
404377	2013 GV_{31}	—	March 11, 2005	Mount Lemmon	Mount Lemmon Survey	·	1.2 km	MPC · JPL
404378	2013 GM_{32}	—	October 22, 2006	Kitt Peak	Spacewatch	(13314)	1.8 km	MPC · JPL
404379	2013 GB_{33}	—	September 16, 2009	Kitt Peak	Spacewatch	·	2.3 km	MPC · JPL
404380	2013 GH_{36}	—	March 17, 2009	Kitt Peak	Spacewatch	·	1.4 km	MPC · JPL
404381	2013 GG_{38}	—	May 3, 2006	Mount Lemmon	Mount Lemmon Survey	·	1.2 km	MPC · JPL
404382	2013 GK_{39}	—	November 17, 2006	Mount Lemmon	Mount Lemmon Survey	HOF	2.8 km	MPC · JPL
404383	2013 GL_{39}	—	January 24, 2004	Socorro	LINEAR	·	1.7 km	MPC · JPL
404384	2013 GP_{39}	—	March 17, 2004	Kitt Peak	Spacewatch	·	2.4 km	MPC · JPL
404385	2013 GB_{43}	—	September 21, 2011	Kitt Peak	Spacewatch	·	1.1 km	MPC · JPL
404386	2013 GF_{43}	—	March 19, 2009	Mount Lemmon	Mount Lemmon Survey	·	1.6 km	MPC · JPL
404387	2013 GN_{43}	—	October 24, 2005	Kitt Peak	Spacewatch	·	2.4 km	MPC · JPL
404388	2013 GE_{44}	—	November 22, 2006	Kitt Peak	Spacewatch	AGN	1.1 km	MPC · JPL
404389	2013 GX_{44}	—	November 7, 2007	Kitt Peak	Spacewatch	·	1.5 km	MPC · JPL
404390	2013 GQ_{45}	—	January 31, 2009	Kitt Peak	Spacewatch	·	1.5 km	MPC · JPL
404391	2013 GC_{46}	—	January 14, 2008	Kitt Peak	Spacewatch	·	1.6 km	MPC · JPL
404392	2013 GR_{47}	—	February 9, 2008	Kitt Peak	Spacewatch	AGN	1.2 km	MPC · JPL
404393	2013 GY_{47}	—	October 22, 2006	Kitt Peak	Spacewatch	PAD	1.8 km	MPC · JPL
404394	2013 GW_{48}	—	December 17, 2007	Mount Lemmon	Mount Lemmon Survey	·	1.3 km	MPC · JPL
404395	2013 GB_{49}	—	October 1, 2005	Kitt Peak	Spacewatch	KOR	1.2 km	MPC · JPL
404396	2013 GH_{52}	—	January 3, 2012	Kitt Peak	Spacewatch	·	2.4 km	MPC · JPL
404397	2013 GV_{52}	—	November 10, 2010	Mount Lemmon	Mount Lemmon Survey	·	2.5 km	MPC · JPL
404398	2013 GW_{53}	—	February 9, 2008	Kitt Peak	Spacewatch	·	1.5 km	MPC · JPL
404399	2013 GF_{54}	—	August 28, 2005	Kitt Peak	Spacewatch	·	1.6 km	MPC · JPL
404400	2013 GD_{56}	—	September 27, 2009	Mount Lemmon	Mount Lemmon Survey	·	2.8 km	MPC · JPL

== 404401–404500 ==
back to top

Designation			Discovery			Properties		Ref
Permanent	Provisional	Named after	Date	Site	Discoverer(s)	Category	Diam.	Ref
404401	2013 GO_{56}	—	February 9, 2008	Mount Lemmon	Mount Lemmon Survey	MRX	1.1 km	MPC · JPL
404402	2013 GW_{56}	—	September 16, 2001	Socorro	LINEAR	·	2.1 km	MPC · JPL
404403	2013 GW_{57}	—	March 26, 2004	Kitt Peak	Spacewatch	·	1.7 km	MPC · JPL
404404	2013 GS_{58}	—	October 9, 2004	Kitt Peak	Spacewatch	·	950 m	MPC · JPL
404405	2013 GR_{59}	—	October 17, 1995	Kitt Peak	Spacewatch	·	1.5 km	MPC · JPL
404406	2013 GV_{59}	—	May 3, 2005	Kitt Peak	Spacewatch	·	1.0 km	MPC · JPL
404407	2013 GR_{60}	—	October 20, 2007	Mount Lemmon	Mount Lemmon Survey	·	1.0 km	MPC · JPL
404408	2013 GZ_{60}	—	March 7, 2013	Kitt Peak	Spacewatch	THM	2.3 km	MPC · JPL
404409	2013 GW_{61}	—	January 13, 2008	Kitt Peak	Spacewatch	(29841)	1.7 km	MPC · JPL
404410	2013 GD_{62}	—	November 13, 2007	Kitt Peak	Spacewatch	·	1.0 km	MPC · JPL
404411	2013 GG_{65}	—	September 10, 2004	Kitt Peak	Spacewatch	·	700 m	MPC · JPL
404412	2013 GN_{67}	—	January 15, 2005	Kitt Peak	Spacewatch	NYS	1.1 km	MPC · JPL
404413	2013 GV_{70}	—	May 4, 2008	Kitt Peak	Spacewatch	·	1.5 km	MPC · JPL
404414	2013 GL_{71}	—	April 20, 2004	Socorro	LINEAR	·	2.1 km	MPC · JPL
404415	2013 GQ_{72}	—	October 7, 2004	Kitt Peak	Spacewatch	·	3.1 km	MPC · JPL
404416	2013 GR_{73}	—	December 22, 2005	Kitt Peak	Spacewatch	·	2.9 km	MPC · JPL
404417	2013 GG_{75}	—	February 29, 2008	Mount Lemmon	Mount Lemmon Survey	·	1.5 km	MPC · JPL
404418	2013 GA_{77}	—	September 16, 2004	Kitt Peak	Spacewatch	·	1.4 km	MPC · JPL
404419	2013 GF_{79}	—	March 15, 2007	Mount Lemmon	Mount Lemmon Survey	·	2.7 km	MPC · JPL
404420	2013 GP_{81}	—	January 30, 2012	Kitt Peak	Spacewatch	·	3.0 km	MPC · JPL
404421	2013 GT_{82}	—	March 4, 2008	Mount Lemmon	Mount Lemmon Survey	·	3.0 km	MPC · JPL
404422	2013 GG_{86}	—	December 25, 2005	Mount Lemmon	Mount Lemmon Survey	·	3.7 km	MPC · JPL
404423	2013 GP_{88}	—	May 19, 2005	Mount Lemmon	Mount Lemmon Survey	·	1.6 km	MPC · JPL
404424	2013 GF_{89}	—	May 20, 2005	Mount Lemmon	Mount Lemmon Survey	·	1.1 km	MPC · JPL
404425	2013 GH_{90}	—	October 3, 2006	Mount Lemmon	Mount Lemmon Survey	·	1.7 km	MPC · JPL
404426	2013 GN_{91}	—	August 8, 2004	Socorro	LINEAR	·	3.0 km	MPC · JPL
404427	2013 GE_{92}	—	March 5, 2000	Socorro	LINEAR	·	1.7 km	MPC · JPL
404428	2013 GX_{92}	—	May 28, 2010	WISE	WISE	KON	3.6 km	MPC · JPL
404429	2013 GW_{93}	—	February 8, 2008	Mount Lemmon	Mount Lemmon Survey	·	1.8 km	MPC · JPL
404430	2013 GZ_{93}	—	November 10, 2010	Mount Lemmon	Mount Lemmon Survey	THM	2.6 km	MPC · JPL
404431	2013 GA_{94}	—	March 16, 2004	Kitt Peak	Spacewatch	·	2.3 km	MPC · JPL
404432	2013 GX_{94}	—	October 13, 2006	Kitt Peak	Spacewatch	·	1.7 km	MPC · JPL
404433	2013 GX_{95}	—	January 10, 2007	Kitt Peak	Spacewatch	·	2.2 km	MPC · JPL
404434	2013 GA_{96}	—	December 18, 2004	Mount Lemmon	Mount Lemmon Survey	V	890 m	MPC · JPL
404435	2013 GV_{96}	—	November 10, 2010	Mount Lemmon	Mount Lemmon Survey	HYG	3.1 km	MPC · JPL
404436	2013 GQ_{97}	—	March 20, 1996	Kitt Peak	Spacewatch	·	3.5 km	MPC · JPL
404437	2013 GJ_{98}	—	September 13, 2007	Mount Lemmon	Mount Lemmon Survey	V	690 m	MPC · JPL
404438	2013 GM_{98}	—	January 27, 2007	Mount Lemmon	Mount Lemmon Survey	·	2.4 km	MPC · JPL
404439	2013 GS_{98}	—	October 8, 2007	Mount Lemmon	Mount Lemmon Survey	·	1.3 km	MPC · JPL
404440	2013 GZ_{98}	—	October 29, 2010	Catalina	CSS	·	2.9 km	MPC · JPL
404441	2013 GF_{101}	—	October 24, 2005	Kitt Peak	Spacewatch	·	2.1 km	MPC · JPL
404442	2013 GT_{101}	—	November 17, 2004	Siding Spring	SSS	·	2.9 km	MPC · JPL
404443	2013 GL_{102}	—	May 15, 2009	Kitt Peak	Spacewatch	·	1.7 km	MPC · JPL
404444	2013 GR_{102}	—	August 13, 2010	Kitt Peak	Spacewatch	·	1.4 km	MPC · JPL
404445	2013 GU_{102}	—	April 16, 2005	Kitt Peak	Spacewatch	·	1.1 km	MPC · JPL
404446	2013 GC_{103}	—	June 18, 1998	Kitt Peak	Spacewatch	·	1.6 km	MPC · JPL
404447	2013 GL_{103}	—	September 30, 2011	Kitt Peak	Spacewatch	·	910 m	MPC · JPL
404448	2013 GD_{104}	—	December 20, 2007	Mount Lemmon	Mount Lemmon Survey	·	1.8 km	MPC · JPL
404449	2013 GD_{105}	—	February 1, 2005	Catalina	CSS	·	1.4 km	MPC · JPL
404450	2013 GK_{107}	—	September 12, 2007	Mount Lemmon	Mount Lemmon Survey	·	940 m	MPC · JPL
404451	2013 GN_{107}	—	February 19, 2009	Mount Lemmon	Mount Lemmon Survey	·	1.2 km	MPC · JPL
404452	2013 GM_{110}	—	May 11, 2002	Socorro	LINEAR	·	3.3 km	MPC · JPL
404453	2013 GN_{110}	—	March 11, 2005	Kitt Peak	Spacewatch	·	2.1 km	MPC · JPL
404454	2013 GS_{110}	—	December 1, 2010	Mount Lemmon	Mount Lemmon Survey	·	3.2 km	MPC · JPL
404455	2013 GB_{111}	—	May 16, 2005	Mount Lemmon	Mount Lemmon Survey	·	1.4 km	MPC · JPL
404456	2013 GA_{113}	—	April 2, 2005	Kitt Peak	Spacewatch	·	1.2 km	MPC · JPL
404457	2013 GV_{114}	—	January 30, 2009	Mount Lemmon	Mount Lemmon Survey	PHO	2.4 km	MPC · JPL
404458	2013 GB_{116}	—	November 7, 2010	Mount Lemmon	Mount Lemmon Survey	·	3.0 km	MPC · JPL
404459	2013 GL_{117}	—	March 16, 2004	Kitt Peak	Spacewatch	·	1.7 km	MPC · JPL
404460	2013 GN_{117}	—	April 7, 2008	Kitt Peak	Spacewatch	·	2.1 km	MPC · JPL
404461	2013 GR_{120}	—	April 13, 2004	Kitt Peak	Spacewatch	·	2.1 km	MPC · JPL
404462	2013 GZ_{120}	—	November 4, 2007	Mount Lemmon	Mount Lemmon Survey	·	1.4 km	MPC · JPL
404463	2013 GD_{121}	—	September 25, 2006	Kitt Peak	Spacewatch	·	1.3 km	MPC · JPL
404464	2013 GG_{123}	—	November 13, 2010	Kitt Peak	Spacewatch	·	2.7 km	MPC · JPL
404465	2013 GK_{123}	—	September 11, 2007	Mount Lemmon	Mount Lemmon Survey	·	970 m	MPC · JPL
404466	2013 GJ_{124}	—	October 17, 2010	Mount Lemmon	Mount Lemmon Survey	KOR	1.3 km	MPC · JPL
404467	2013 GQ_{124}	—	February 9, 2008	Kitt Peak	Spacewatch	·	1.6 km	MPC · JPL
404468	2013 GH_{126}	—	October 7, 2004	Kitt Peak	Spacewatch	·	2.9 km	MPC · JPL
404469	2013 GR_{126}	—	October 11, 1996	Kitt Peak	Spacewatch	·	1.6 km	MPC · JPL
404470	2013 GU_{128}	—	April 2, 2009	Mount Lemmon	Mount Lemmon Survey	·	2.1 km	MPC · JPL
404471	2013 GB_{131}	—	November 23, 2008	Kitt Peak	Spacewatch	·	950 m	MPC · JPL
404472	2013 GZ_{134}	—	January 25, 2006	Kitt Peak	Spacewatch	·	4.2 km	MPC · JPL
404473	2013 GH_{135}	—	November 19, 2006	Kitt Peak	Spacewatch	AGN	1.3 km	MPC · JPL
404474	2013 GT_{135}	—	May 13, 2004	Kitt Peak	Spacewatch	·	2.4 km	MPC · JPL
404475	2013 GD_{136}	—	November 2, 2010	Kitt Peak	Spacewatch	·	3.0 km	MPC · JPL
404476	2013 GG_{136}	—	March 31, 2004	Kitt Peak	Spacewatch	·	1.8 km	MPC · JPL
404477	2013 GL_{136}	—	November 25, 2005	Kitt Peak	Spacewatch	·	3.0 km	MPC · JPL
404478	2013 HG_{2}	—	March 10, 2007	Kitt Peak	Spacewatch	·	3.7 km	MPC · JPL
404479	2013 HL_{4}	—	June 8, 1997	Kitt Peak	Spacewatch	·	2.9 km	MPC · JPL
404480	2013 HB_{5}	—	May 14, 2004	Socorro	LINEAR	·	3.0 km	MPC · JPL
404481	2013 HW_{8}	—	January 19, 2008	Mount Lemmon	Mount Lemmon Survey	·	1.9 km	MPC · JPL
404482	2013 HH_{9}	—	February 2, 2009	Kitt Peak	Spacewatch	·	1.6 km	MPC · JPL
404483	2013 HX_{12}	—	February 3, 2008	Kitt Peak	Spacewatch	·	2.0 km	MPC · JPL
404484	2013 HH_{16}	—	March 10, 2007	Mount Lemmon	Mount Lemmon Survey	·	2.4 km	MPC · JPL
404485	2013 HL_{16}	—	November 1, 2005	Mount Lemmon	Mount Lemmon Survey	·	3.0 km	MPC · JPL
404486	2013 HD_{18}	—	November 4, 2007	Mount Lemmon	Mount Lemmon Survey	·	2.0 km	MPC · JPL
404487	2013 HP_{18}	—	September 23, 2009	Mount Lemmon	Mount Lemmon Survey	·	3.2 km	MPC · JPL
404488	2013 HK_{20}	—	January 1, 2012	Mount Lemmon	Mount Lemmon Survey	·	3.4 km	MPC · JPL
404489	2013 HF_{23}	—	February 22, 2006	Mount Lemmon	Mount Lemmon Survey	(2076)	920 m	MPC · JPL
404490	2013 HS_{23}	—	January 31, 2000	Socorro	LINEAR	·	1.8 km	MPC · JPL
404491	2013 HH_{24}	—	September 17, 2006	Kitt Peak	Spacewatch	·	1.2 km	MPC · JPL
404492	2013 HL_{24}	—	February 10, 2008	Mount Lemmon	Mount Lemmon Survey	EOS	2.4 km	MPC · JPL
404493	2013 HH_{26}	—	March 11, 2005	Mount Lemmon	Mount Lemmon Survey	·	1.3 km	MPC · JPL
404494	2013 HK_{26}	—	March 15, 2005	Mount Lemmon	Mount Lemmon Survey	·	1.3 km	MPC · JPL
404495	2013 HA_{28}	—	October 17, 2010	Mount Lemmon	Mount Lemmon Survey	·	3.2 km	MPC · JPL
404496	2013 HU_{28}	—	December 5, 2005	Kitt Peak	Spacewatch	EOS	2.2 km	MPC · JPL
404497	2013 HT_{29}	—	October 16, 1996	Kitt Peak	Spacewatch	·	1.9 km	MPC · JPL
404498	2013 HN_{30}	—	October 11, 2007	Kitt Peak	Spacewatch	·	1.5 km	MPC · JPL
404499	2013 HK_{31}	—	November 1, 2006	Mount Lemmon	Mount Lemmon Survey	·	1.8 km	MPC · JPL
404500	2013 HA_{32}	—	January 13, 2005	Catalina	CSS	·	1.2 km	MPC · JPL

== 404501–404600 ==
back to top

Designation			Discovery			Properties		Ref
Permanent	Provisional	Named after	Date	Site	Discoverer(s)	Category	Diam.	Ref
404501	2013 HD_{33}	—	August 28, 2005	Kitt Peak	Spacewatch	·	1.7 km	MPC · JPL
404502	2013 HF_{36}	—	February 11, 2008	Kitt Peak	Spacewatch	·	1.6 km	MPC · JPL
404503	2013 HG_{36}	—	December 15, 2006	Kitt Peak	Spacewatch	·	2.1 km	MPC · JPL
404504	2013 HL_{36}	—	January 2, 2012	Mount Lemmon	Mount Lemmon Survey	·	1.6 km	MPC · JPL
404505	2013 HU_{41}	—	November 13, 2010	Mount Lemmon	Mount Lemmon Survey	·	2.0 km	MPC · JPL
404506	2013 HV_{41}	—	March 2, 1997	Kitt Peak	Spacewatch	·	1.8 km	MPC · JPL
404507	2013 HX_{41}	—	September 15, 2009	Kitt Peak	Spacewatch	·	2.4 km	MPC · JPL
404508	2013 HB_{48}	—	March 13, 2008	Mount Lemmon	Mount Lemmon Survey	AGN	1.2 km	MPC · JPL
404509	2013 HF_{48}	—	October 25, 1997	Caussols	ODAS	·	2.4 km	MPC · JPL
404510	2013 HO_{50}	—	August 19, 2006	Kitt Peak	Spacewatch	·	1.5 km	MPC · JPL
404511	2013 HY_{51}	—	October 26, 2005	Kitt Peak	Spacewatch	·	1.4 km	MPC · JPL
404512	2013 HJ_{54}	—	August 28, 2006	Kitt Peak	Spacewatch	·	1.7 km	MPC · JPL
404513	2013 HP_{54}	—	September 27, 2006	Mount Lemmon	Mount Lemmon Survey	·	1.5 km	MPC · JPL
404514	2013 HY_{59}	—	October 4, 2004	Kitt Peak	Spacewatch	·	3.6 km	MPC · JPL
404515	2013 HX_{60}	—	September 28, 1994	Kitt Peak	Spacewatch	·	1.2 km	MPC · JPL
404516	2013 HV_{67}	—	February 6, 2007	Mount Lemmon	Mount Lemmon Survey	·	1.7 km	MPC · JPL
404517	2013 HZ_{68}	—	December 15, 2004	Kitt Peak	Spacewatch	·	740 m	MPC · JPL
404518	2013 HE_{78}	—	November 13, 2010	Mount Lemmon	Mount Lemmon Survey	·	1.5 km	MPC · JPL
404519	2013 HP_{96}	—	April 2, 2005	Mount Lemmon	Mount Lemmon Survey	·	1.0 km	MPC · JPL
404520	2013 HD_{97}	—	September 24, 2005	Kitt Peak	Spacewatch	KOR	1.2 km	MPC · JPL
404521	2013 HR_{98}	—	November 10, 2010	Mount Lemmon	Mount Lemmon Survey	·	1.9 km	MPC · JPL
404522	2013 HF_{102}	—	December 15, 2004	Kitt Peak	Spacewatch	·	760 m	MPC · JPL
404523	2013 HA_{111}	—	September 10, 2007	Mount Lemmon	Mount Lemmon Survey	MAS	700 m	MPC · JPL
404524	2013 HH_{111}	—	January 15, 2005	Kitt Peak	Spacewatch	NYS	1.0 km	MPC · JPL
404525	2013 HN_{116}	—	October 7, 2004	Kitt Peak	Spacewatch	·	660 m	MPC · JPL
404526	2013 HK_{119}	—	November 25, 2005	Kitt Peak	Spacewatch	·	2.8 km	MPC · JPL
404527	2013 HP_{121}	—	February 3, 2008	Kitt Peak	Spacewatch	·	1.5 km	MPC · JPL
404528	2013 HX_{123}	—	November 4, 2010	Mount Lemmon	Mount Lemmon Survey	·	1.9 km	MPC · JPL
404529	2013 HK_{127}	—	September 4, 2010	Kitt Peak	Spacewatch	·	1.7 km	MPC · JPL
404530	2013 HM_{128}	—	January 28, 2003	Kitt Peak	Spacewatch	·	2.1 km	MPC · JPL
404531	2013 HX_{131}	—	September 28, 2001	Palomar	NEAT	·	1.4 km	MPC · JPL
404532	2013 HN_{135}	—	January 14, 2008	Kitt Peak	Spacewatch	·	940 m	MPC · JPL
404533	2013 HB_{138}	—	October 15, 2007	Mount Lemmon	Mount Lemmon Survey	V	560 m	MPC · JPL
404534	2013 HA_{142}	—	April 7, 2008	Mount Lemmon	Mount Lemmon Survey	KOR	1.0 km	MPC · JPL
404535	2013 HY_{142}	—	February 16, 2001	Kitt Peak	Spacewatch	THM	2.1 km	MPC · JPL
404536	2013 JS_{1}	—	December 6, 2007	Kitt Peak	Spacewatch	·	1.5 km	MPC · JPL
404537	2013 JH_{7}	—	October 19, 2010	Mount Lemmon	Mount Lemmon Survey	BRA	2.1 km	MPC · JPL
404538	2013 JE_{13}	—	October 16, 2009	Catalina	CSS	·	3.6 km	MPC · JPL
404539	2013 JP_{18}	—	October 7, 2004	Kitt Peak	Spacewatch	HYG	2.8 km	MPC · JPL
404540	2013 JM_{19}	—	August 21, 2004	Siding Spring	SSS	·	2.3 km	MPC · JPL
404541	2013 JL_{21}	—	December 27, 2005	Kitt Peak	Spacewatch	EOS	2.4 km	MPC · JPL
404542	2013 JY_{22}	—	October 12, 2010	Mount Lemmon	Mount Lemmon Survey	·	2.2 km	MPC · JPL
404543	2013 JM_{24}	—	March 12, 2002	Kitt Peak	Spacewatch	·	1.6 km	MPC · JPL
404544	2013 JG_{25}	—	May 28, 2009	Mount Lemmon	Mount Lemmon Survey	·	1.3 km	MPC · JPL
404545	2013 JC_{26}	—	January 10, 2006	Mount Lemmon	Mount Lemmon Survey	·	3.1 km	MPC · JPL
404546	2013 JR_{26}	—	September 27, 2003	Kitt Peak	Spacewatch	·	3.1 km	MPC · JPL
404547	2013 JL_{30}	—	November 8, 1996	Kitt Peak	Spacewatch	BRA	1.6 km	MPC · JPL
404548	2013 JJ_{31}	—	February 17, 2007	Kitt Peak	Spacewatch	·	2.5 km	MPC · JPL
404549	2013 JP_{31}	—	February 8, 2007	Kitt Peak	Spacewatch	KOR	1.4 km	MPC · JPL
404550	2013 JY_{32}	—	February 1, 2006	Mount Lemmon	Mount Lemmon Survey	EOS	2.3 km	MPC · JPL
404551	2013 JE_{35}	—	November 27, 2011	Mount Lemmon	Mount Lemmon Survey	TIR	3.3 km	MPC · JPL
404552	2013 JX_{38}	—	November 21, 2009	Catalina	CSS	·	4.8 km	MPC · JPL
404553	2013 JA_{40}	—	January 8, 2006	Mount Lemmon	Mount Lemmon Survey	·	3.4 km	MPC · JPL
404554	2013 JR_{40}	—	April 15, 2007	Mount Lemmon	Mount Lemmon Survey	·	3.6 km	MPC · JPL
404555	2013 JY_{40}	—	December 29, 2005	Kitt Peak	Spacewatch	·	2.5 km	MPC · JPL
404556	2013 JC_{41}	—	April 4, 2003	Kitt Peak	Spacewatch	·	2.0 km	MPC · JPL
404557	2013 JK_{42}	—	January 4, 2012	Kitt Peak	Spacewatch	·	1.9 km	MPC · JPL
404558	2013 JT_{42}	—	September 15, 2009	Kitt Peak	Spacewatch	·	2.9 km	MPC · JPL
404559	2013 JW_{43}	—	February 6, 2007	Mount Lemmon	Mount Lemmon Survey	·	1.9 km	MPC · JPL
404560	2013 JB_{45}	—	November 17, 2006	Kitt Peak	Spacewatch	·	1.7 km	MPC · JPL
404561	2013 JL_{46}	—	October 7, 2004	Kitt Peak	Spacewatch	·	2.8 km	MPC · JPL
404562	2013 JM_{47}	—	May 3, 2008	Kitt Peak	Spacewatch	·	1.9 km	MPC · JPL
404563	2013 JO_{50}	—	October 13, 2004	Kitt Peak	Spacewatch	ARM	4.5 km	MPC · JPL
404564	2013 JX_{50}	—	May 11, 1996	Kitt Peak	Spacewatch	·	3.4 km	MPC · JPL
404565	2013 JK_{52}	—	August 28, 2005	Kitt Peak	Spacewatch	·	1.7 km	MPC · JPL
404566	2013 JS_{53}	—	December 25, 2005	Kitt Peak	Spacewatch	THM	2.4 km	MPC · JPL
404567	2013 JB_{54}	—	June 17, 2010	WISE	WISE	·	2.7 km	MPC · JPL
404568	2013 JD_{54}	—	February 16, 2001	Kitt Peak	Spacewatch	EOS	2.0 km	MPC · JPL
404569	2013 JV_{57}	—	January 22, 2006	Mount Lemmon	Mount Lemmon Survey	·	2.3 km	MPC · JPL
404570	2013 JL_{59}	—	October 13, 2004	Kitt Peak	Spacewatch	·	1.9 km	MPC · JPL
404571	2013 JQ_{59}	—	May 29, 2008	Mount Lemmon	Mount Lemmon Survey	·	2.9 km	MPC · JPL
404572	2013 JX_{59}	—	October 9, 2004	Kitt Peak	Spacewatch	·	2.7 km	MPC · JPL
404573	2013 JD_{60}	—	November 1, 2005	Kitt Peak	Spacewatch	·	2.2 km	MPC · JPL
404574	2013 JE_{62}	—	March 3, 2005	Catalina	CSS	·	1.2 km	MPC · JPL
404575	2013 JX_{62}	—	January 10, 2007	Mount Lemmon	Mount Lemmon Survey	GEF	1.5 km	MPC · JPL
404576	2013 KH_{4}	—	February 23, 2007	Kitt Peak	Spacewatch	·	2.4 km	MPC · JPL
404577	2013 KU_{9}	—	November 10, 2004	Kitt Peak	Spacewatch	·	3.2 km	MPC · JPL
404578	2013 KG_{10}	—	February 25, 2007	Mount Lemmon	Mount Lemmon Survey	·	2.5 km	MPC · JPL
404579	2013 KR_{10}	—	April 26, 2007	Kitt Peak	Spacewatch	·	3.1 km	MPC · JPL
404580	2013 KU_{10}	—	December 2, 2005	Kitt Peak	Spacewatch	LIX	4.4 km	MPC · JPL
404581	2013 KU_{11}	—	January 31, 2006	Kitt Peak	Spacewatch	·	3.0 km	MPC · JPL
404582	2013 LW_{4}	—	December 8, 2005	Kitt Peak	Spacewatch	·	2.6 km	MPC · JPL
404583	2013 LH_{8}	—	August 13, 2010	Kitt Peak	Spacewatch	·	1.3 km	MPC · JPL
404584	2013 LG_{11}	—	January 21, 2012	Haleakala	Pan-STARRS 1	·	2.9 km	MPC · JPL
404585	2013 LS_{18}	—	September 16, 2009	Catalina	CSS	·	4.3 km	MPC · JPL
404586	2013 LZ_{23}	—	December 26, 2011	Mount Lemmon	Mount Lemmon Survey	·	2.7 km	MPC · JPL
404587	2013 LP_{31}	—	March 14, 2007	Mount Lemmon	Mount Lemmon Survey	·	2.8 km	MPC · JPL
404588	2013 LE_{35}	—	February 26, 2010	WISE	WISE	ULA · CYB	6.2 km	MPC · JPL
404589	2013 MJ	—	February 1, 2000	Kitt Peak	Spacewatch	·	3.4 km	MPC · JPL
404590	2013 ML_{1}	—	April 15, 2007	Mount Lemmon	Mount Lemmon Survey	·	2.9 km	MPC · JPL
404591	2013 MM_{1}	—	December 27, 2005	Kitt Peak	Spacewatch	·	3.2 km	MPC · JPL
404592	2013 MT_{2}	—	February 26, 2007	Mount Lemmon	Mount Lemmon Survey	·	2.7 km	MPC · JPL
404593	2013 MU_{9}	—	April 19, 2007	Kitt Peak	Spacewatch	·	2.9 km	MPC · JPL
404594	2013 NT_{20}	—	December 14, 1993	Kitt Peak	Spacewatch	·	3.2 km	MPC · JPL
404595	2013 PT_{45}	—	November 3, 2000	Kitt Peak	Spacewatch	·	610 m	MPC · JPL
404596	2013 QK_{26}	—	November 15, 1998	Kitt Peak	Spacewatch	·	3.3 km	MPC · JPL
404597	2013 SW_{27}	—	January 29, 2000	Kitt Peak	Spacewatch	·	2.7 km	MPC · JPL
404598	2013 VF_{10}	—	April 1, 2008	Kitt Peak	Spacewatch	·	1.5 km	MPC · JPL
404599	2013 WN_{7}	—	November 2, 2000	Kitt Peak	Spacewatch	·	1.6 km	MPC · JPL
404600	2013 WD_{27}	—	October 12, 1998	Kitt Peak	Spacewatch	·	1.3 km	MPC · JPL

== 404601–404700 ==
back to top

Designation			Discovery			Properties		Ref
Permanent	Provisional	Named after	Date	Site	Discoverer(s)	Category	Diam.	Ref
404601	2013 WT_{108}	—	November 16, 2006	Mount Lemmon	Mount Lemmon Survey	·	1.5 km	MPC · JPL
404602	2013 YD_{35}	—	December 12, 1999	Socorro	LINEAR	·	840 m	MPC · JPL
404603	2014 BM_{2}	—	February 7, 2003	Desert Eagle	W. K. Y. Yeung	·	3.7 km	MPC · JPL
404604	2014 CK_{23}	—	October 23, 2003	Anderson Mesa	LONEOS	·	2.6 km	MPC · JPL
404605	2014 DR_{71}	—	April 4, 2003	Kitt Peak	Spacewatch	·	3.5 km	MPC · JPL
404606	2014 DE_{120}	—	April 11, 2005	Mount Lemmon	Mount Lemmon Survey	AGN	1.5 km	MPC · JPL
404607	2014 EK_{40}	—	November 6, 1996	Kitt Peak	Spacewatch	·	2.5 km	MPC · JPL
404608	2014 FO_{34}	—	October 25, 2005	Catalina	CSS	·	1.0 km	MPC · JPL
404609	2014 FC_{48}	—	October 21, 2003	Kitt Peak	Spacewatch	·	3.2 km	MPC · JPL
404610	2014 GQ_{3}	—	February 22, 2003	Kitt Peak	Spacewatch	NYS	980 m	MPC · JPL
404611	2014 GL_{5}	—	March 23, 2006	Mount Lemmon	Mount Lemmon Survey	·	1.6 km	MPC · JPL
404612	2014 GB_{8}	—	April 7, 1997	Kitt Peak	Spacewatch	·	3.2 km	MPC · JPL
404613	2014 GD_{8}	—	March 13, 2005	Mount Lemmon	Mount Lemmon Survey	·	2.5 km	MPC · JPL
404614	2014 GH_{16}	—	April 11, 2003	Kitt Peak	Spacewatch	VER	2.9 km	MPC · JPL
404615	2014 GJ_{19}	—	November 3, 1999	Kitt Peak	Spacewatch	·	1.2 km	MPC · JPL
404616	2014 GY_{19}	—	October 9, 2005	Kitt Peak	Spacewatch	·	2.4 km	MPC · JPL
404617	2014 GP_{33}	—	September 7, 2004	Kitt Peak	Spacewatch	·	1.3 km	MPC · JPL
404618	2014 GP_{36}	—	February 10, 2008	Catalina	CSS	·	4.1 km	MPC · JPL
404619	2014 GY_{39}	—	April 30, 2003	Kitt Peak	Spacewatch	V	700 m	MPC · JPL
404620	2014 GE_{40}	—	December 3, 2007	Kitt Peak	Spacewatch	·	2.4 km	MPC · JPL
404621	2014 GS_{41}	—	April 27, 2006	Cerro Tololo	Deep Ecliptic Survey	·	1.1 km	MPC · JPL
404622	2014 GR_{42}	—	October 12, 2005	Kitt Peak	Spacewatch	·	2.9 km	MPC · JPL
404623	2014 GP_{47}	—	October 10, 2012	Kitt Peak	Spacewatch	·	1.8 km	MPC · JPL
404624	2014 GQ_{48}	—	January 16, 2013	Mount Lemmon	Mount Lemmon Survey	·	2.5 km	MPC · JPL
404625	2014 GD_{49}	—	February 24, 2006	Mount Lemmon	Mount Lemmon Survey	H	540 m	MPC · JPL
404626	2014 HU	—	November 19, 2007	Mount Lemmon	Mount Lemmon Survey	·	1.8 km	MPC · JPL
404627	2014 HW_{1}	—	July 15, 2007	Siding Spring	SSS	·	1.6 km	MPC · JPL
404628	2014 HL_{6}	—	May 11, 2010	Kitt Peak	Spacewatch	·	1.6 km	MPC · JPL
404629	2014 HC_{7}	—	February 10, 2002	Socorro	LINEAR	·	1.3 km	MPC · JPL
404630	2014 HE_{9}	—	May 10, 2003	Kitt Peak	Spacewatch	·	1.4 km	MPC · JPL
404631	2014 HT_{9}	—	November 16, 2001	Kitt Peak	Spacewatch	·	890 m	MPC · JPL
404632	2014 HB_{11}	—	February 10, 2002	Socorro	LINEAR	·	3.4 km	MPC · JPL
404633	2014 HP_{12}	—	November 14, 2006	Kitt Peak	Spacewatch	·	1.8 km	MPC · JPL
404634	2014 HD_{13}	—	November 20, 2006	Kitt Peak	Spacewatch	EOS	1.7 km	MPC · JPL
404635	2014 HL_{13}	—	March 23, 2006	Kitt Peak	Spacewatch	3:2 · SHU	5.8 km	MPC · JPL
404636	2014 HQ_{13}	—	May 25, 2007	Mount Lemmon	Mount Lemmon Survey	MAS	760 m	MPC · JPL
404637	2014 HY_{15}	—	May 11, 2005	Mount Lemmon	Mount Lemmon Survey	PAD	1.5 km	MPC · JPL
404638	2014 HT_{16}	—	September 24, 2000	Socorro	LINEAR	MAS	860 m	MPC · JPL
404639	2014 HQ_{17}	—	February 1, 2003	Kitt Peak	Spacewatch	·	1.1 km	MPC · JPL
404640	2014 HL_{19}	—	March 11, 1996	Kitt Peak	Spacewatch	·	870 m	MPC · JPL
404641	2014 HR_{20}	—	March 3, 1997	Kitt Peak	Spacewatch	·	1.2 km	MPC · JPL
404642	2014 HN_{25}	—	March 9, 2005	Catalina	CSS	ADE	2.1 km	MPC · JPL
404643	2014 HX_{27}	—	October 28, 2005	Mount Lemmon	Mount Lemmon Survey	·	2.4 km	MPC · JPL
404644	2014 HE_{29}	—	October 25, 2005	Mount Lemmon	Mount Lemmon Survey	NYS	850 m	MPC · JPL
404645	2014 HT_{30}	—	November 26, 1994	Kitt Peak	Spacewatch	V	780 m	MPC · JPL
404646	2014 HV_{32}	—	November 8, 2007	Kitt Peak	Spacewatch	·	1.9 km	MPC · JPL
404647	2014 HA_{34}	—	May 2, 2009	Mount Lemmon	Mount Lemmon Survey	·	2.7 km	MPC · JPL
404648	2014 HB_{35}	—	June 3, 2009	Mount Lemmon	Mount Lemmon Survey	·	1.8 km	MPC · JPL
404649	2014 HR_{37}	—	August 28, 2005	Kitt Peak	Spacewatch	EOS	1.9 km	MPC · JPL
404650	2014 HX_{38}	—	February 3, 2009	Kitt Peak	Spacewatch	·	1.3 km	MPC · JPL
404651	2014 HL_{40}	—	April 3, 2000	Anderson Mesa	LONEOS	·	900 m	MPC · JPL
404652	2014 HQ_{42}	—	April 19, 2004	Kitt Peak	Spacewatch	·	660 m	MPC · JPL
404653	2014 HT_{42}	—	May 3, 2006	Mount Lemmon	Mount Lemmon Survey	3:2	4.8 km	MPC · JPL
404654	2014 HG_{43}	—	March 10, 2003	Campo Imperatore	CINEOS	TIR	2.9 km	MPC · JPL
404655	2014 HN_{44}	—	September 26, 2006	Kitt Peak	Spacewatch	·	1.9 km	MPC · JPL
404656	2014 HZ_{65}	—	September 20, 2007	Kitt Peak	Spacewatch	·	1.7 km	MPC · JPL
404657	2014 HX_{66}	—	October 23, 2006	Mount Lemmon	Mount Lemmon Survey	·	2.8 km	MPC · JPL
404658	2014 HA_{86}	—	November 14, 1999	Kitt Peak	Spacewatch	·	1.2 km	MPC · JPL
404659	2014 HJ_{94}	—	November 18, 2003	Kitt Peak	Spacewatch	MAR	990 m	MPC · JPL
404660	2014 HC_{122}	—	October 1, 2008	Mount Lemmon	Mount Lemmon Survey	·	1.2 km	MPC · JPL
404661	2014 HZ_{122}	—	October 30, 2011	Mount Lemmon	Mount Lemmon Survey	EUN	1.5 km	MPC · JPL
404662	2014 HQ_{123}	—	June 4, 2006	Mount Lemmon	Mount Lemmon Survey	H	660 m	MPC · JPL
404663	2014 HW_{124}	—	March 3, 2005	Catalina	CSS	ADE	2.5 km	MPC · JPL
404664	2014 HT_{125}	—	September 18, 2006	Kitt Peak	Spacewatch	KOR	1.2 km	MPC · JPL
404665	2014 HT_{126}	—	March 17, 2009	Kitt Peak	Spacewatch	·	2.5 km	MPC · JPL
404666	2014 HE_{129}	—	February 21, 2006	Anderson Mesa	LONEOS	·	1.3 km	MPC · JPL
404667	2014 HO_{137}	—	January 15, 2010	Kitt Peak	Spacewatch	NYS	940 m	MPC · JPL
404668	2014 HH_{147}	—	June 23, 2007	Kitt Peak	Spacewatch	·	1.2 km	MPC · JPL
404669	2014 HK_{149}	—	October 24, 2005	Kitt Peak	Spacewatch	·	2.6 km	MPC · JPL
404670	2014 HD_{151}	—	August 31, 2005	Kitt Peak	Spacewatch	·	610 m	MPC · JPL
404671	2014 HV_{152}	—	October 9, 2005	Kitt Peak	Spacewatch	·	1.8 km	MPC · JPL
404672	2014 HC_{155}	—	October 30, 2005	Kitt Peak	Spacewatch	THM	2.6 km	MPC · JPL
404673	2014 HP_{157}	—	January 28, 2004	Kitt Peak	Spacewatch	·	1.7 km	MPC · JPL
404674	2014 HK_{161}	—	December 21, 2006	Kitt Peak	Spacewatch	·	3.3 km	MPC · JPL
404675	2014 HM_{161}	—	December 26, 2005	Mount Lemmon	Mount Lemmon Survey	·	1.1 km	MPC · JPL
404676	2014 HC_{163}	—	December 17, 2000	Kitt Peak	Spacewatch	·	3.9 km	MPC · JPL
404677	2014 HU_{164}	—	March 9, 2005	Anderson Mesa	LONEOS	·	3.1 km	MPC · JPL
404678	2014 HW_{164}	—	March 6, 1999	Kitt Peak	Spacewatch	BRA	1.7 km	MPC · JPL
404679	2014 HP_{168}	—	April 30, 2006	Kitt Peak	Spacewatch	·	960 m	MPC · JPL
404680	2014 HQ_{168}	—	February 1, 2006	Mount Lemmon	Mount Lemmon Survey	·	1.0 km	MPC · JPL
404681	2014 HT_{168}	—	February 28, 2008	Kitt Peak	Spacewatch	EOS	1.9 km	MPC · JPL
404682	2014 HX_{168}	—	April 9, 2005	Kitt Peak	Spacewatch	JUN	1.2 km	MPC · JPL
404683	2014 HJ_{170}	—	January 5, 2000	Kitt Peak	Spacewatch	L4	8.6 km	MPC · JPL
404684	2014 HK_{171}	—	December 26, 2005	Kitt Peak	Spacewatch	·	1.4 km	MPC · JPL
404685	2014 HR_{171}	—	May 11, 2003	Kitt Peak	Spacewatch	VER	3.0 km	MPC · JPL
404686	2014 HA_{179}	—	October 27, 2005	Anderson Mesa	LONEOS	EOS	2.6 km	MPC · JPL
404687	2014 HL_{179}	—	March 24, 2001	Anderson Mesa	LONEOS	·	2.2 km	MPC · JPL
404688	2014 HW_{179}	—	February 20, 2010	Kitt Peak	Spacewatch	NYS	1.1 km	MPC · JPL
404689	2014 HL_{180}	—	April 30, 2000	Socorro	LINEAR	·	2.1 km	MPC · JPL
404690	2014 HR_{181}	—	April 14, 2004	Kitt Peak	Spacewatch	·	870 m	MPC · JPL
404691	2014 HW_{182}	—	June 14, 2009	Kitt Peak	Spacewatch	·	3.0 km	MPC · JPL
404692	2014 HC_{184}	—	April 15, 2008	Mount Lemmon	Mount Lemmon Survey	·	3.1 km	MPC · JPL
404693	2014 HW_{184}	—	October 13, 1999	Socorro	LINEAR	ELF	4.2 km	MPC · JPL
404694	2014 HJ_{185}	—	December 19, 2004	Mount Lemmon	Mount Lemmon Survey	·	1.6 km	MPC · JPL
404695	2014 HP_{186}	—	July 29, 2004	Siding Spring	SSS	·	3.2 km	MPC · JPL
404696	2014 HS_{186}	—	April 9, 2005	Kitt Peak	Spacewatch	·	1.7 km	MPC · JPL
404697	2014 HF_{187}	—	January 31, 2006	Kitt Peak	Spacewatch	MAS	810 m	MPC · JPL
404698	2014 HD_{188}	—	May 15, 2007	Mount Lemmon	Mount Lemmon Survey	V	750 m	MPC · JPL
404699	2014 HH_{190}	—	December 14, 2001	Kitt Peak	Spacewatch	·	1.2 km	MPC · JPL
404700	2014 JQ	—	April 30, 1997	Kitt Peak	Spacewatch	·	3.6 km	MPC · JPL

== 404701–404800 ==
back to top

Designation			Discovery			Properties		Ref
Permanent	Provisional	Named after	Date	Site	Discoverer(s)	Category	Diam.	Ref
404701	2014 JF_{2}	—	January 15, 2005	Kitt Peak	Spacewatch	·	1.4 km	MPC · JPL
404702	2014 JM_{2}	—	April 26, 2006	Catalina	CSS	H	590 m	MPC · JPL
404703	2014 JL_{3}	—	January 30, 2006	Kitt Peak	Spacewatch	NYS	1.3 km	MPC · JPL
404704	2014 JN_{3}	—	December 19, 2009	Mount Lemmon	Mount Lemmon Survey	(2076)	790 m	MPC · JPL
404705	2014 JQ_{3}	—	January 10, 2007	Kitt Peak	Spacewatch	·	4.0 km	MPC · JPL
404706	2014 JV_{3}	—	November 8, 2007	Mount Lemmon	Mount Lemmon Survey	·	2.1 km	MPC · JPL
404707	2014 JM_{5}	—	May 19, 2010	Mount Lemmon	Mount Lemmon Survey	·	1.2 km	MPC · JPL
404708	2014 JT_{5}	—	May 18, 2001	Socorro	LINEAR	JUN	1.4 km	MPC · JPL
404709	2014 JN_{6}	—	February 27, 2006	Kitt Peak	Spacewatch	NYS	1.1 km	MPC · JPL
404710	2014 JO_{6}	—	January 25, 2009	Kitt Peak	Spacewatch	·	1.3 km	MPC · JPL
404711	2014 JQ_{6}	—	May 8, 2005	Mount Lemmon	Mount Lemmon Survey	WIT	1.4 km	MPC · JPL
404712	2014 JH_{7}	—	July 12, 2010	WISE	WISE	·	2.9 km	MPC · JPL
404713	2014 JX_{7}	—	October 1, 2005	Kitt Peak	Spacewatch	·	2.6 km	MPC · JPL
404714	2014 JB_{8}	—	February 15, 2010	Catalina	CSS	·	690 m	MPC · JPL
404715	2014 JM_{8}	—	December 22, 2008	Kitt Peak	Spacewatch	·	1.1 km	MPC · JPL
404716	2014 JK_{10}	—	October 29, 2005	Mount Lemmon	Mount Lemmon Survey	·	4.0 km	MPC · JPL
404717	2014 JZ_{10}	—	April 21, 2006	Kitt Peak	Spacewatch	·	960 m	MPC · JPL
404718	2014 JO_{13}	—	March 17, 2004	Kitt Peak	Spacewatch	·	2.8 km	MPC · JPL
404719	2014 JW_{13}	—	December 10, 2004	Kitt Peak	Spacewatch	·	990 m	MPC · JPL
404720	2014 JA_{14}	—	November 19, 2008	Mount Lemmon	Mount Lemmon Survey	·	1.3 km	MPC · JPL
404721	2014 JJ_{14}	—	October 2, 2008	Kitt Peak	Spacewatch	·	1.1 km	MPC · JPL
404722	2014 JT_{14}	—	October 7, 2004	Socorro	LINEAR	·	1.2 km	MPC · JPL
404723	2014 JG_{17}	—	October 26, 2005	Kitt Peak	Spacewatch	·	4.2 km	MPC · JPL
404724	2014 JU_{18}	—	February 19, 2002	Kitt Peak	Spacewatch	·	1.2 km	MPC · JPL
404725	2014 JJ_{19}	—	December 18, 2001	Socorro	LINEAR	·	2.9 km	MPC · JPL
404726	2014 JR_{19}	—	February 28, 2008	Kitt Peak	Spacewatch	·	2.9 km	MPC · JPL
404727	2014 JZ_{20}	—	August 24, 2007	Kitt Peak	Spacewatch	·	960 m	MPC · JPL
404728	2014 JB_{21}	—	April 13, 2004	Kitt Peak	Spacewatch	KOR	1.7 km	MPC · JPL
404729	2014 JM_{21}	—	October 7, 2005	Anderson Mesa	LONEOS	·	3.5 km	MPC · JPL
404730	2014 JN_{21}	—	September 23, 2006	Kitt Peak	Spacewatch	·	1.6 km	MPC · JPL
404731	2014 JJ_{22}	—	March 10, 2007	Mount Lemmon	Mount Lemmon Survey	·	690 m	MPC · JPL
404732	2014 JX_{22}	—	September 12, 2007	Mount Lemmon	Mount Lemmon Survey	·	1.3 km	MPC · JPL
404733	2014 JY_{22}	—	January 12, 2002	Kitt Peak	Spacewatch	·	1.5 km	MPC · JPL
404734	2014 JE_{23}	—	January 29, 2009	Catalina	CSS	EUN	1.6 km	MPC · JPL
404735	2014 JJ_{23}	—	November 28, 1994	Kitt Peak	Spacewatch	·	3.7 km	MPC · JPL
404736	2014 JK_{23}	—	December 16, 2004	Kitt Peak	Spacewatch	·	1.8 km	MPC · JPL
404737	2014 JV_{25}	—	December 31, 2007	Mount Lemmon	Mount Lemmon Survey	H	740 m	MPC · JPL
404738	2014 JD_{26}	—	November 17, 2006	Mount Lemmon	Mount Lemmon Survey	T_{j} (2.98)	2.8 km	MPC · JPL
404739	2014 JG_{26}	—	December 20, 2004	Mount Lemmon	Mount Lemmon Survey	·	3.7 km	MPC · JPL
404740	2014 JL_{26}	—	December 21, 2008	Catalina	CSS	·	2.5 km	MPC · JPL
404741	2014 JA_{27}	—	December 4, 2005	Kitt Peak	Spacewatch	·	4.0 km	MPC · JPL
404742	2014 JN_{28}	—	June 21, 2009	Mount Lemmon	Mount Lemmon Survey	·	3.8 km	MPC · JPL
404743	2014 JN_{29}	—	May 2, 2006	Kitt Peak	Spacewatch	·	1.7 km	MPC · JPL
404744	2014 JD_{31}	—	May 4, 2006	Catalina	CSS	H	820 m	MPC · JPL
404745	2014 JF_{31}	—	October 27, 2005	Anderson Mesa	LONEOS	EOS	2.6 km	MPC · JPL
404746	2014 JG_{31}	—	October 26, 2005	Kitt Peak	Spacewatch	·	3.2 km	MPC · JPL
404747	2014 JO_{32}	—	February 28, 2009	Kitt Peak	Spacewatch	·	1.6 km	MPC · JPL
404748	2014 JQ_{32}	—	March 11, 2005	Mount Lemmon	Mount Lemmon Survey	·	1.4 km	MPC · JPL
404749	2014 JW_{32}	—	April 14, 2007	Mount Lemmon	Mount Lemmon Survey	·	840 m	MPC · JPL
404750	2014 JV_{33}	—	October 4, 2004	Kitt Peak	Spacewatch	·	2.8 km	MPC · JPL
404751	2014 JJ_{34}	—	December 28, 2005	Kitt Peak	Spacewatch	·	1.1 km	MPC · JPL
404752	2014 JN_{34}	—	November 8, 2007	Mount Lemmon	Mount Lemmon Survey	GEF	1.2 km	MPC · JPL
404753	2014 JF_{35}	—	March 31, 2008	Mount Lemmon	Mount Lemmon Survey	·	2.2 km	MPC · JPL
404754	2014 JQ_{35}	—	November 25, 2005	Mount Lemmon	Mount Lemmon Survey	·	650 m	MPC · JPL
404755	2014 JD_{37}	—	October 10, 2007	Kitt Peak	Spacewatch	·	1.4 km	MPC · JPL
404756	2014 JH_{37}	—	September 27, 2006	Kitt Peak	Spacewatch	HOF	2.9 km	MPC · JPL
404757	2014 JX_{37}	—	June 18, 2010	Mount Lemmon	Mount Lemmon Survey	·	1.9 km	MPC · JPL
404758	2014 JG_{38}	—	October 15, 2007	Mount Lemmon	Mount Lemmon Survey	·	950 m	MPC · JPL
404759	2014 JL_{38}	—	December 13, 2006	Kitt Peak	Spacewatch	·	3.3 km	MPC · JPL
404760	2014 JG_{39}	—	April 11, 1996	Kitt Peak	Spacewatch	·	1.2 km	MPC · JPL
404761	2014 JQ_{39}	—	November 20, 2008	Kitt Peak	Spacewatch	·	1.3 km	MPC · JPL
404762	2014 JL_{40}	—	June 13, 2007	Kitt Peak	Spacewatch	V	670 m	MPC · JPL
404763	2014 JC_{41}	—	November 20, 2007	Kitt Peak	Spacewatch	·	1.4 km	MPC · JPL
404764	2014 JV_{41}	—	September 15, 2006	Kitt Peak	Spacewatch	·	2.0 km	MPC · JPL
404765	2014 JM_{42}	—	January 9, 2007	Kitt Peak	Spacewatch	EOS	2.3 km	MPC · JPL
404766	2014 JN_{42}	—	May 8, 2010	WISE	WISE	·	810 m	MPC · JPL
404767	2014 JW_{42}	—	November 17, 2006	Mount Lemmon	Mount Lemmon Survey	·	2.7 km	MPC · JPL
404768	2014 JA_{43}	—	February 17, 2010	Kitt Peak	Spacewatch	·	770 m	MPC · JPL
404769	2014 JG_{43}	—	January 13, 1996	Kitt Peak	Spacewatch	·	1.6 km	MPC · JPL
404770	2014 JL_{43}	—	December 13, 2004	Kitt Peak	Spacewatch	·	1.8 km	MPC · JPL
404771	2014 JO_{43}	—	May 27, 2000	Socorro	LINEAR	·	2.8 km	MPC · JPL
404772	2014 JP_{43}	—	December 7, 2005	Kitt Peak	Spacewatch	·	3.5 km	MPC · JPL
404773	2014 JW_{44}	—	March 7, 2008	Catalina	CSS	·	3.6 km	MPC · JPL
404774	2014 JF_{46}	—	April 26, 2006	Kitt Peak	Spacewatch	·	1.2 km	MPC · JPL
404775	2014 JH_{46}	—	October 26, 2005	Kitt Peak	Spacewatch	·	3.4 km	MPC · JPL
404776	2014 JO_{46}	—	September 27, 2008	Mount Lemmon	Mount Lemmon Survey	·	1.3 km	MPC · JPL
404777	2014 JP_{46}	—	November 16, 1995	Kitt Peak	Spacewatch	·	1.4 km	MPC · JPL
404778	2014 JP_{47}	—	November 30, 2011	Catalina	CSS	KON	2.6 km	MPC · JPL
404779	2014 JU_{49}	—	May 9, 2005	Kitt Peak	Spacewatch	·	1.7 km	MPC · JPL
404780	2014 JW_{49}	—	March 28, 2009	Catalina	CSS	·	3.3 km	MPC · JPL
404781	2014 JE_{50}	—	December 21, 2008	Catalina	CSS	V	670 m	MPC · JPL
404782	2014 JJ_{50}	—	January 27, 2007	Mount Lemmon	Mount Lemmon Survey	·	880 m	MPC · JPL
404783	2014 JN_{50}	—	May 29, 2006	Kitt Peak	Spacewatch	PHO	1.2 km	MPC · JPL
404784	2014 JJ_{51}	—	December 3, 2005	Mauna Kea	A. Boattini	MAS	760 m	MPC · JPL
404785	2014 JW_{51}	—	November 4, 2005	Mount Lemmon	Mount Lemmon Survey	·	990 m	MPC · JPL
404786	2014 JB_{52}	—	May 5, 1997	Socorro	LINEAR	PHO	1.2 km	MPC · JPL
404787	2014 JC_{52}	—	September 13, 2004	Kitt Peak	Spacewatch	·	400 m	MPC · JPL
404788	2014 JT_{52}	—	February 29, 2008	Mount Lemmon	Mount Lemmon Survey	·	2.1 km	MPC · JPL
404789	2014 JR_{53}	—	April 25, 1998	Kitt Peak	Spacewatch	·	1.9 km	MPC · JPL
404790	2014 JB_{54}	—	March 11, 2008	Mount Lemmon	Mount Lemmon Survey	·	2.5 km	MPC · JPL
404791	2014 JO_{54}	—	November 7, 2007	Mount Lemmon	Mount Lemmon Survey	H	620 m	MPC · JPL
404792	2014 JS_{59}	—	May 28, 2009	Mount Lemmon	Mount Lemmon Survey	·	2.1 km	MPC · JPL
404793	2014 JT_{59}	—	October 8, 2008	Catalina	CSS	·	870 m	MPC · JPL
404794	2014 JU_{59}	—	October 20, 1995	Kitt Peak	Spacewatch	·	1.9 km	MPC · JPL
404795	2014 JX_{59}	—	April 28, 2009	Kitt Peak	Spacewatch	·	2.3 km	MPC · JPL
404796	2014 JG_{60}	—	March 30, 2008	Catalina	CSS	·	5.0 km	MPC · JPL
404797	2014 JH_{60}	—	May 12, 2010	Mount Lemmon	Mount Lemmon Survey	·	1.2 km	MPC · JPL
404798	2014 JQ_{60}	—	June 6, 2005	Kitt Peak	Spacewatch	·	2.6 km	MPC · JPL
404799	2014 JV_{60}	—	October 12, 2007	Mount Lemmon	Mount Lemmon Survey	MAR	1.4 km	MPC · JPL
404800	2014 JW_{60}	—	November 28, 2011	Kitt Peak	Spacewatch	GEF	1.3 km	MPC · JPL

== 404801–404900 ==
back to top

Designation			Discovery			Properties		Ref
Permanent	Provisional	Named after	Date	Site	Discoverer(s)	Category	Diam.	Ref
404801	2014 JC_{61}	—	March 30, 2008	Catalina	CSS	·	3.8 km	MPC · JPL
404802	2014 JO_{61}	—	September 26, 1995	Kitt Peak	Spacewatch	·	2.5 km	MPC · JPL
404803	2014 JQ_{61}	—	October 7, 2010	Catalina	CSS	EOS	1.9 km	MPC · JPL
404804	2014 JR_{62}	—	September 10, 2004	Socorro	LINEAR	·	1.3 km	MPC · JPL
404805	2014 JS_{62}	—	September 27, 2006	Kitt Peak	Spacewatch	·	2.5 km	MPC · JPL
404806	2014 JJ_{63}	—	June 14, 2010	WISE	WISE	·	4.9 km	MPC · JPL
404807	2014 JS_{63}	—	March 24, 2003	Kitt Peak	Spacewatch	·	900 m	MPC · JPL
404808	2014 JU_{64}	—	March 13, 2010	Kitt Peak	Spacewatch	MAS	790 m	MPC · JPL
404809	2014 JY_{64}	—	December 10, 2004	Kitt Peak	Spacewatch	PHO	1.1 km	MPC · JPL
404810	2014 JX_{65}	—	November 2, 2007	Mount Lemmon	Mount Lemmon Survey	·	1.2 km	MPC · JPL
404811	2014 JZ_{65}	—	January 2, 2000	Kitt Peak	Spacewatch	·	720 m	MPC · JPL
404812	2014 JB_{67}	—	November 22, 2006	Mount Lemmon	Mount Lemmon Survey	EOS	2.1 km	MPC · JPL
404813	2014 JM_{67}	—	September 11, 2007	Mount Lemmon	Mount Lemmon Survey	·	1.3 km	MPC · JPL
404814	2014 JT_{67}	—	March 23, 2003	Kitt Peak	Spacewatch	NYS	1.2 km	MPC · JPL
404815	2014 JD_{68}	—	February 21, 2004	Kitt Peak	Spacewatch	(13314)	1.8 km	MPC · JPL
404816	2014 JM_{68}	—	May 22, 2001	Kitt Peak	Spacewatch	·	1.7 km	MPC · JPL
404817	2014 JE_{70}	—	February 13, 2010	Mount Lemmon	Mount Lemmon Survey	MAS	650 m	MPC · JPL
404818	2014 JW_{70}	—	October 17, 2006	Mount Lemmon	Mount Lemmon Survey	KOR	1.6 km	MPC · JPL
404819	2014 JZ_{70}	—	October 30, 2005	Kitt Peak	Spacewatch	·	1.9 km	MPC · JPL
404820	2014 JL_{72}	—	November 19, 2008	Mount Lemmon	Mount Lemmon Survey	·	1.3 km	MPC · JPL
404821	2014 JM_{72}	—	September 25, 2006	Kitt Peak	Spacewatch	AEO	1.2 km	MPC · JPL
404822	2014 JN_{72}	—	November 16, 2003	Kitt Peak	Spacewatch	·	1.3 km	MPC · JPL
404823	2014 JE_{73}	—	May 28, 2000	Socorro	LINEAR	·	3.0 km	MPC · JPL
404824	2014 JQ_{73}	—	September 7, 2011	Kitt Peak	Spacewatch	CLA	1.5 km	MPC · JPL
404825	2014 JC_{74}	—	September 12, 2004	Kitt Peak	Spacewatch	·	3.2 km	MPC · JPL
404826	2014 JE_{74}	—	April 5, 2003	Kitt Peak	Spacewatch	·	810 m	MPC · JPL
404827	2014 JP_{74}	—	October 11, 1999	Kitt Peak	Spacewatch	·	2.4 km	MPC · JPL
404828	2014 JO_{75}	—	June 11, 2007	Siding Spring	SSS	·	1.2 km	MPC · JPL
404829	2014 JB_{76}	—	November 3, 2007	Kitt Peak	Spacewatch	·	830 m	MPC · JPL
404830	2014 JH_{76}	—	March 13, 2010	Kitt Peak	Spacewatch	MAS	720 m	MPC · JPL
404831	2014 JK_{76}	—	January 30, 2006	Kitt Peak	Spacewatch	NYS	1.1 km	MPC · JPL
404832	2014 JL_{76}	—	May 10, 2003	Kitt Peak	Spacewatch	·	2.9 km	MPC · JPL
404833	2014 JM_{76}	—	February 17, 2010	Kitt Peak	Spacewatch	NYS	930 m	MPC · JPL
404834	2014 JK_{77}	—	October 28, 2008	Kitt Peak	Spacewatch	·	1.5 km	MPC · JPL
404835	2014 JN_{77}	—	October 28, 2005	Kitt Peak	Spacewatch	·	600 m	MPC · JPL
404836	2014 JR_{77}	—	November 16, 2006	Mount Lemmon	Mount Lemmon Survey	KOR	1.6 km	MPC · JPL
404837	2014 JW_{77}	—	March 11, 2008	Catalina	CSS	·	5.9 km	MPC · JPL
404838	2014 JB_{78}	—	August 7, 2010	XuYi	PMO NEO Survey Program	·	1.6 km	MPC · JPL
404839	2014 JC_{78}	—	June 13, 2010	WISE	WISE	·	3.1 km	MPC · JPL
404840	2014 KQ_{1}	—	March 13, 2007	Kitt Peak	Spacewatch	·	670 m	MPC · JPL
404841	2014 KW_{2}	—	May 23, 1998	Kitt Peak	Spacewatch	EOS	2.0 km	MPC · JPL
404842	2014 KO_{3}	—	June 15, 2005	Kitt Peak	Spacewatch	·	2.3 km	MPC · JPL
404843	2014 KZ_{4}	—	April 28, 2003	Kitt Peak	Spacewatch	MAS	930 m	MPC · JPL
404844	2014 KG_{5}	—	November 18, 2003	Kitt Peak	Spacewatch	MAR	990 m	MPC · JPL
404845	2014 KD_{12}	—	April 8, 2003	Kitt Peak	Spacewatch	·	1.0 km	MPC · JPL
404846	2014 KL_{12}	—	March 26, 2003	Kitt Peak	Spacewatch	·	990 m	MPC · JPL
404847	2014 KA_{13}	—	March 29, 2008	Kitt Peak	Spacewatch	THM	3.1 km	MPC · JPL
404848	2014 KM_{15}	—	February 28, 2009	Kitt Peak	Spacewatch	AGN	1.1 km	MPC · JPL
404849	2014 KQ_{15}	—	February 8, 2008	Siding Spring	SSS	·	5.4 km	MPC · JPL
404850	2014 KS_{15}	—	August 30, 2005	Kitt Peak	Spacewatch	·	2.2 km	MPC · JPL
404851	2014 KT_{15}	—	October 22, 2005	Kitt Peak	Spacewatch	·	810 m	MPC · JPL
404852	2014 KK_{16}	—	March 29, 2007	Kitt Peak	Spacewatch	·	750 m	MPC · JPL
404853	2014 KL_{16}	—	September 12, 2010	Mount Lemmon	Mount Lemmon Survey	·	2.3 km	MPC · JPL
404854	2014 KM_{16}	—	August 29, 2006	Catalina	CSS	·	1.5 km	MPC · JPL
404855	2014 KT_{16}	—	April 30, 1997	Socorro	LINEAR	·	4.7 km	MPC · JPL
404856	2014 KB_{17}	—	October 29, 2005	Kitt Peak	Spacewatch	·	2.9 km	MPC · JPL
404857	2014 KF_{17}	—	March 26, 2009	Mount Lemmon	Mount Lemmon Survey	·	2.4 km	MPC · JPL
404858	2014 KC_{18}	—	May 26, 2003	Kitt Peak	Spacewatch	V	670 m	MPC · JPL
404859	2014 KF_{20}	—	December 1, 2006	Mount Lemmon	Mount Lemmon Survey	·	3.8 km	MPC · JPL
404860	2014 KO_{20}	—	July 29, 2010	WISE	WISE	·	4.0 km	MPC · JPL
404861	2014 KX_{20}	—	February 4, 2009	Mount Lemmon	Mount Lemmon Survey	ADE	2.4 km	MPC · JPL
404862	2014 KF_{25}	—	February 25, 2006	Kitt Peak	Spacewatch	·	1.2 km	MPC · JPL
404863	2014 KV_{25}	—	June 7, 2000	Kitt Peak	Spacewatch	·	1.2 km	MPC · JPL
404864	2014 KE_{27}	—	January 27, 2007	Kitt Peak	Spacewatch	EOS	2.2 km	MPC · JPL
404865	2014 KW_{28}	—	December 31, 2008	Catalina	CSS	·	1.8 km	MPC · JPL
404866	2014 KJ_{30}	—	May 26, 2003	Kitt Peak	Spacewatch	EUP	3.0 km	MPC · JPL
404867	2014 KR_{31}	—	April 19, 2007	Mount Lemmon	Mount Lemmon Survey	V	730 m	MPC · JPL
404868	2014 KV_{32}	—	October 11, 2004	Kitt Peak	Spacewatch	·	2.8 km	MPC · JPL
404869	2014 KV_{42}	—	July 1, 2009	Siding Spring	SSS	·	4.5 km	MPC · JPL
404870	2014 KW_{42}	—	June 15, 2009	Mount Lemmon	Mount Lemmon Survey	·	4.3 km	MPC · JPL
404871	2014 KU_{43}	—	October 24, 2008	Mount Lemmon	Mount Lemmon Survey	MAR	1.1 km	MPC · JPL
404872	2014 KC_{44}	—	March 5, 2008	Mount Lemmon	Mount Lemmon Survey	·	2.4 km	MPC · JPL
404873	2014 KF_{51}	—	March 21, 2009	Mount Lemmon	Mount Lemmon Survey	·	1.5 km	MPC · JPL
404874	2014 KW_{52}	—	November 26, 2003	Kitt Peak	Spacewatch	·	1.5 km	MPC · JPL
404875	2014 KX_{53}	—	July 25, 2010	WISE	WISE	·	4.1 km	MPC · JPL
404876	2014 KZ_{53}	—	June 24, 2000	Kitt Peak	Spacewatch	·	1.9 km	MPC · JPL
404877	2014 KB_{54}	—	February 7, 2002	Socorro	LINEAR	·	1.7 km	MPC · JPL
404878	2014 KA_{56}	—	September 26, 2000	Socorro	LINEAR	·	1.3 km	MPC · JPL
404879	2014 KD_{56}	—	June 26, 2010	WISE	WISE	·	3.2 km	MPC · JPL
404880	2014 KR_{56}	—	November 1, 2005	Catalina	CSS	EOS	2.7 km	MPC · JPL
404881	2014 KW_{57}	—	April 17, 1996	Kitt Peak	Spacewatch	·	1.1 km	MPC · JPL
404882	2014 KV_{58}	—	January 13, 2008	Kitt Peak	Spacewatch	·	2.3 km	MPC · JPL
404883	2014 KD_{62}	—	August 28, 2009	Catalina	CSS	·	3.1 km	MPC · JPL
404884	2014 KH_{65}	—	December 17, 2003	Kitt Peak	Spacewatch	·	1.8 km	MPC · JPL
404885	2014 KC_{68}	—	October 2, 2008	Kitt Peak	Spacewatch	·	660 m	MPC · JPL
404886	2014 KJ_{72}	—	January 19, 2002	Kitt Peak	Spacewatch	EOS	1.7 km	MPC · JPL
404887	2014 KB_{73}	—	September 17, 2006	Kitt Peak	Spacewatch	·	1.8 km	MPC · JPL
404888	2014 KU_{73}	—	March 11, 2008	Kitt Peak	Spacewatch	·	3.2 km	MPC · JPL
404889	2014 KS_{74}	—	September 27, 2006	Catalina	CSS	·	2.0 km	MPC · JPL
404890	2014 KU_{74}	—	November 19, 2008	Kitt Peak	Spacewatch	·	2.1 km	MPC · JPL
404891	2014 KE_{75}	—	April 10, 2005	Kitt Peak	Spacewatch	·	1.9 km	MPC · JPL
404892	2014 KJ_{77}	—	February 9, 2007	Mount Lemmon	Mount Lemmon Survey	·	3.1 km	MPC · JPL
404893	2014 KL_{77}	—	January 17, 2007	Kitt Peak	Spacewatch	·	3.1 km	MPC · JPL
404894	2014 KZ_{77}	—	April 2, 2005	Catalina	CSS	·	2.2 km	MPC · JPL
404895	2014 KA_{78}	—	January 19, 2002	Kitt Peak	Spacewatch	·	5.9 km	MPC · JPL
404896	2014 KZ_{78}	—	November 19, 2003	Kitt Peak	Spacewatch	·	1.6 km	MPC · JPL
404897	2014 KF_{81}	—	October 22, 2006	Kitt Peak	Spacewatch	·	2.2 km	MPC · JPL
404898	2014 KN_{81}	—	October 27, 2005	Mount Lemmon	Mount Lemmon Survey	·	880 m	MPC · JPL
404899	2014 KD_{83}	—	May 28, 2000	Socorro	LINEAR	·	2.2 km	MPC · JPL
404900	2014 KT_{83}	—	October 8, 2007	Catalina	CSS	·	1.8 km	MPC · JPL

== 404901–405000 ==
back to top

Designation			Discovery			Properties		Ref
Permanent	Provisional	Named after	Date	Site	Discoverer(s)	Category	Diam.	Ref
404901	2014 KT_{85}	—	November 18, 2003	Kitt Peak	Spacewatch	MAR	1.4 km	MPC · JPL
404902	2014 KA_{86}	—	April 28, 2010	WISE	WISE	·	2.3 km	MPC · JPL
404903	2014 KD_{87}	—	October 22, 2006	Mount Lemmon	Mount Lemmon Survey	·	5.2 km	MPC · JPL
404904	2014 KJ_{89}	—	April 22, 2007	Catalina	CSS	V	770 m	MPC · JPL
404905	2014 KM_{89}	—	February 25, 2006	Kitt Peak	Spacewatch	·	1.1 km	MPC · JPL
404906	2014 KP_{91}	—	February 14, 2002	Kitt Peak	Spacewatch	NYS	1.4 km	MPC · JPL
404907	2014 KB_{92}	—	February 1, 2009	Mount Lemmon	Mount Lemmon Survey	EUN	1.2 km	MPC · JPL
404908	2014 KH_{92}	—	November 22, 2008	Kitt Peak	Spacewatch	·	880 m	MPC · JPL
404909	2014 KM_{92}	—	April 4, 2008	Kitt Peak	Spacewatch	·	4.3 km	MPC · JPL
404910	2014 KP_{95}	—	March 15, 2005	Mount Lemmon	Mount Lemmon Survey	·	1.9 km	MPC · JPL
404911	2014 KD_{96}	—	November 4, 2005	Mount Lemmon	Mount Lemmon Survey	·	4.0 km	MPC · JPL
404912	2014 KW_{96}	—	February 25, 2007	Mount Lemmon	Mount Lemmon Survey	·	2.8 km	MPC · JPL
404913	2014 KL_{97}	—	May 1, 2003	Kitt Peak	Spacewatch	·	4.1 km	MPC · JPL
404914	2014 KB_{98}	—	April 7, 2008	Mount Lemmon	Mount Lemmon Survey	·	2.6 km	MPC · JPL
404915	2014 KH_{98}	—	March 18, 2010	Mount Lemmon	Mount Lemmon Survey	NYS	1.1 km	MPC · JPL
404916	2014 KU_{98}	—	October 9, 2004	Kitt Peak	Spacewatch	·	1.4 km	MPC · JPL
404917	2014 KO_{100}	—	November 2, 2005	Mount Lemmon	Mount Lemmon Survey	·	690 m	MPC · JPL
404918	2014 LR	—	December 27, 2005	Kitt Peak	Spacewatch	·	4.0 km	MPC · JPL
404919	2014 LF_{11}	—	October 4, 2006	Mount Lemmon	Mount Lemmon Survey	·	1.5 km	MPC · JPL
404920	2014 LG_{11}	—	November 20, 2008	Kitt Peak	Spacewatch	·	860 m	MPC · JPL
404921	2014 LW_{12}	—	March 1, 2009	Mount Lemmon	Mount Lemmon Survey	·	1.3 km	MPC · JPL
404922	2014 LZ_{12}	—	January 21, 2010	WISE	WISE	·	2.1 km	MPC · JPL
404923	2014 LN_{13}	—	June 16, 2007	Kitt Peak	Spacewatch	·	1.6 km	MPC · JPL
404924	2014 LT_{13}	—	January 1, 2009	Kitt Peak	Spacewatch	·	1.5 km	MPC · JPL
404925	2014 LA_{14}	—	December 12, 2012	Mount Lemmon	Mount Lemmon Survey	·	1.1 km	MPC · JPL
404926	2014 LN_{15}	—	December 22, 2003	Kitt Peak	Spacewatch	·	2.0 km	MPC · JPL
404927	2014 LU_{15}	—	April 26, 2009	Catalina	CSS	·	2.2 km	MPC · JPL
404928	2014 LL_{17}	—	March 17, 2010	Mount Lemmon	Mount Lemmon Survey	·	970 m	MPC · JPL
404929	2014 LG_{18}	—	October 25, 2007	Mount Lemmon	Mount Lemmon Survey	·	1.5 km	MPC · JPL
404930	2014 LF_{20}	—	March 23, 2003	Kitt Peak	Spacewatch	·	940 m	MPC · JPL
404931	2014 LG_{20}	—	February 15, 2010	Kitt Peak	Spacewatch	·	910 m	MPC · JPL
404932	2014 LG_{22}	—	January 17, 2009	Kitt Peak	Spacewatch	·	1.6 km	MPC · JPL
404933	2014 LR_{23}	—	January 17, 2007	Kitt Peak	Spacewatch	·	4.2 km	MPC · JPL
404934	2014 MF_{4}	—	December 22, 2008	Kitt Peak	Spacewatch	V	750 m	MPC · JPL
404935	2014 ML_{7}	—	June 20, 2010	Mount Lemmon	Mount Lemmon Survey	·	2.4 km	MPC · JPL
404936	2014 MN_{7}	—	October 5, 2007	Siding Spring	SSS	·	1.2 km	MPC · JPL
404937	2014 MP_{7}	—	November 1, 2010	Mount Lemmon	Mount Lemmon Survey	·	3.7 km	MPC · JPL
404938	2014 MT_{7}	—	December 15, 2006	Mount Lemmon	Mount Lemmon Survey	·	4.2 km	MPC · JPL
404939	2014 MR_{9}	—	April 16, 2007	Catalina	CSS	·	710 m	MPC · JPL
404940	2014 MG_{11}	—	February 23, 2007	Mount Lemmon	Mount Lemmon Survey	·	2.3 km	MPC · JPL
404941	2014 MW_{14}	—	September 22, 2009	Catalina	CSS	·	3.1 km	MPC · JPL
404942	2014 MJ_{20}	—	March 16, 2004	Siding Spring	SSS	·	2.6 km	MPC · JPL
404943	6824 P-L	—	September 24, 1960	Palomar	C. J. van Houten, I. van Houten-Groeneveld, T. Gehrels	·	1.5 km	MPC · JPL
404944	3493 T-3	—	October 16, 1977	Palomar	C. J. van Houten, I. van Houten-Groeneveld, T. Gehrels	·	2.0 km	MPC · JPL
404945	1981 EM_{32}	—	March 7, 1981	Siding Spring	S. J. Bus	·	2.3 km	MPC · JPL
404946	1993 TO_{26}	—	October 9, 1993	La Silla	E. W. Elst	·	2.5 km	MPC · JPL
404947	1995 SR_{15}	—	September 18, 1995	Kitt Peak	Spacewatch	·	2.0 km	MPC · JPL
404948	1995 YL_{9}	—	December 18, 1995	Kitt Peak	Spacewatch	EOS	2.1 km	MPC · JPL
404949	1996 GA_{4}	—	April 9, 1996	Kitt Peak	Spacewatch	MAR	1.4 km	MPC · JPL
404950	1996 TG_{4}	—	October 8, 1996	Haleakala	NEAT	·	2.1 km	MPC · JPL
404951	1996 TV_{18}	—	October 4, 1996	Kitt Peak	Spacewatch	·	2.2 km	MPC · JPL
404952	1996 TQ_{28}	—	October 7, 1996	Kitt Peak	Spacewatch	GEF	1.2 km	MPC · JPL
404953	1996 VA_{25}	—	November 10, 1996	Kitt Peak	Spacewatch	CYB	4.2 km	MPC · JPL
404954	1996 XX_{17}	—	December 7, 1996	Kitt Peak	Spacewatch	·	1.0 km	MPC · JPL
404955	1997 SK_{11}	—	September 23, 1997	Kitt Peak	Spacewatch	·	1.6 km	MPC · JPL
404956	1998 BN_{9}	—	January 18, 1998	Kitt Peak	Spacewatch	·	1 km	MPC · JPL
404957	1998 BU_{38}	—	January 29, 1998	Kitt Peak	Spacewatch	MRX	800 m	MPC · JPL
404958	1998 DF_{11}	—	February 25, 1998	Haleakala	NEAT	·	810 m	MPC · JPL
404959	1998 RS_{13}	—	September 13, 1998	Kitt Peak	Spacewatch	·	3.2 km	MPC · JPL
404960	1998 RM_{56}	—	September 14, 1998	Socorro	LINEAR	·	4.1 km	MPC · JPL
404961	1998 SW_{8}	—	September 20, 1998	Kitt Peak	Spacewatch	·	2.5 km	MPC · JPL
404962	1998 SL_{40}	—	September 24, 1998	Kitt Peak	Spacewatch	·	900 m	MPC · JPL
404963	1998 SD_{52}	—	September 28, 1998	Kitt Peak	Spacewatch	THM	1.8 km	MPC · JPL
404964	1998 SL_{97}	—	September 26, 1998	Socorro	LINEAR	·	5.1 km	MPC · JPL
404965	1998 TP_{8}	—	October 12, 1998	Kitt Peak	Spacewatch	LIX	2.3 km	MPC · JPL
404966	1998 TQ_{22}	—	October 13, 1998	Kitt Peak	Spacewatch	THM	2.0 km	MPC · JPL
404967	1999 BV_{28}	—	January 13, 1999	Kitt Peak	Spacewatch	·	790 m	MPC · JPL
404968	1999 TE_{43}	—	October 3, 1999	Kitt Peak	Spacewatch	MAS	630 m	MPC · JPL
404969	1999 TL_{58}	—	October 6, 1999	Kitt Peak	Spacewatch	·	2.6 km	MPC · JPL
404970	1999 TR_{207}	—	October 14, 1999	Socorro	LINEAR	·	3.6 km	MPC · JPL
404971	1999 TY_{214}	—	October 15, 1999	Socorro	LINEAR	·	1.1 km	MPC · JPL
404972	1999 TJ_{264}	—	October 15, 1999	Kitt Peak	Spacewatch	3:2	4.5 km	MPC · JPL
404973	1999 UF_{57}	—	October 29, 1999	Kitt Peak	Spacewatch	EOS	1.9 km	MPC · JPL
404974	1999 VF_{75}	—	November 5, 1999	Kitt Peak	Spacewatch	·	1.2 km	MPC · JPL
404975	1999 VM_{80}	—	November 4, 1999	Socorro	LINEAR	·	2.1 km	MPC · JPL
404976	1999 VT_{107}	—	November 9, 1999	Socorro	LINEAR	·	3.8 km	MPC · JPL
404977	1999 VA_{113}	—	November 9, 1999	Socorro	LINEAR	T_{j} (2.93)	6.2 km	MPC · JPL
404978	1999 WC_{19}	—	November 30, 1999	Kitt Peak	Spacewatch	·	2.7 km	MPC · JPL
404979	1999 XQ_{139}	—	December 2, 1999	Kitt Peak	Spacewatch	T_{j} (2.96)	4.0 km	MPC · JPL
404980	1999 XH_{145}	—	November 15, 1999	Kitt Peak	Spacewatch	·	2.3 km	MPC · JPL
404981	1999 XR_{251}	—	December 9, 1999	Kitt Peak	Spacewatch	·	1.6 km	MPC · JPL
404982	1999 XG_{255}	—	December 4, 1999	Kitt Peak	Spacewatch	·	4.0 km	MPC · JPL
404983	1999 XO_{260}	—	December 7, 1999	Socorro	LINEAR	·	2.8 km	MPC · JPL
404984	1999 YE_{8}	—	December 16, 1999	Kitt Peak	Spacewatch	·	2.1 km	MPC · JPL
404985	2000 AJ_{220}	—	January 8, 2000	Kitt Peak	Spacewatch	·	3.5 km	MPC · JPL
404986	2000 BL_{39}	—	January 27, 2000	Kitt Peak	Spacewatch	·	2.7 km	MPC · JPL
404987	2000 CA_{3}	—	February 2, 2000	Socorro	LINEAR	T_{j} (2.95)	4.7 km	MPC · JPL
404988	2000 CL_{73}	—	February 7, 2000	Kitt Peak	Spacewatch	·	3.8 km	MPC · JPL
404989	2000 DJ_{89}	—	February 26, 2000	Kitt Peak	Spacewatch	·	2.9 km	MPC · JPL
404990	2000 DB_{111}	—	February 29, 2000	Socorro	LINEAR	·	1.5 km	MPC · JPL
404991	2000 EU_{4}	—	March 2, 2000	Kitt Peak	Spacewatch	·	3.2 km	MPC · JPL
404992	2000 GB_{3}	—	April 5, 2000	Socorro	LINEAR	T_{j} (2.99)	3.6 km	MPC · JPL
404993	2000 GR_{132}	—	April 12, 2000	Haleakala	NEAT	·	1.6 km	MPC · JPL
404994	2000 QZ_{186}	—	August 26, 2000	Socorro	LINEAR	·	2.3 km	MPC · JPL
404995	2000 QA_{210}	—	August 31, 2000	Socorro	LINEAR	·	1.0 km	MPC · JPL
404996	2000 RZ_{36}	—	September 3, 2000	Socorro	LINEAR	TIN	1.1 km	MPC · JPL
404997	2000 RA_{85}	—	September 2, 2000	Anderson Mesa	LONEOS	·	4.5 km	MPC · JPL
404998	2000 SP_{30}	—	September 24, 2000	Socorro	LINEAR	·	1.8 km	MPC · JPL
404999	2000 SW_{262}	—	September 25, 2000	Socorro	LINEAR	·	2.5 km	MPC · JPL
405000	2000 SQ_{288}	—	September 27, 2000	Socorro	LINEAR	DOR	2.8 km	MPC · JPL

back to top

== Meaning of names ==
As minor planet discoveries are confirmed, they are given a permanent number by the IAU's Minor Planet Center (MPC), and the discoverers can then submit names for them, following the IAU's naming conventions. The list below concerns those minor planets in the specified number-range that have received names, and explains the meanings of those names.

Official naming citations of newly named small Solar System bodies are approved and published in a bulletin by IAU's Working Group for Small Bodies Nomenclature (WGSBN). Before May 2021, citations were published in MPC's Minor Planet Circulars for many decades. Recent citations can also be found on the JPL Small-Body Database (SBDB). Until his death in 2016, German astronomer Lutz D. Schmadel compiled these citations into the Dictionary of Minor Planet Names (DMP) and regularly updated the collection.

Based on Paul Herget's The Names of the Minor Planets, Schmadel also researched the unclear origin of numerous asteroids, most of which had been named prior to World War II. This article incorporates text from this source, which is in the public domain: SBDB New namings may only be added to this list below after official publication as the preannouncement of names is condemned. The WGSBN publishes a comprehensive guideline for the naming rules of non-cometary small Solar System bodies.

Named minor planet	Provisional	This minor planet was named for...	Ref · Catalog
404016 Alexandralabenz	2012 CE_{13}	Alexandra P. Labenz, American University of Arizona History Department graduate student and historian.	IAU · 404016
