= List of named minor planets: 8000–8999 =

This is a partial list of named minor planets in numerical order. It contains a total of 785 entries as of 27 July 2026. Minor planets for which no article exist are displayed in grey color and redirect to the list of minor planets (see List of minor planets § Main index).

== From 8,000 to 8,999 ==
- 8000 Isaac Newton
- 8001 Ramsden
- 8002 Tonyevans
- 8003 Kelvin
- 8005 Albinadubois
- 8006 Tacchini
- 8009 Béguin
- 8010 Böhnhardt
- 8011 Saijokeiichi
- 8013 Gordonmoore
- 8015 Marksimons
- 8019 Karachkina
- 8020 Erzgebirge
- 8021 Walter
- 8022 Scottcrossfield
- 8023 Josephwalker
- 8024 Robertwhite
- 8025 Forrestpeterson
- 8026 Johnmckay
- 8027 Robertrushworth
- 8028 Joeengle
- 8029 Miltthompson
- 8030 Williamknight
- 8031 Williamdana
- 8032 Michaeladams
- 8034 Akka
- 8036 Maehara
- 8039 Grandprism
- 8040 Utsumikazuhiko
- 8041 Masumoto
- 8043 Fukuhara
- 8044 Tsuchiyama
- 8045 Kamiyama
- 8046 Ajiki
- 8047 Akikinoshita
- 8048 Andrle
- 8049 Janvier
- 8050 Beishida
- 8051 Pistoria
- 8052 Novalis
- 8053 Kleist
- 8054 Brentano
- 8055 Arnim
- 8056 Tieck
- 8057 Hofmannsthal
- 8058 Zuckmayer
- 8059 Deliyannis
- 8060 Anius
- 8061 Gaudium
- 8062 Okhotsymskij
- 8063 Cristinathomas
- 8064 Lisitsa
- 8065 Nakhodkin
- 8066 Poldimeri
- 8067 Helfenstein
- 8068 Vishnureddy
- 8069 Benweiss
- 8070 DeMeo
- 8071 Simonelli
- 8072 Yojikondo
- 8073 Johnharmon
- 8074 Slade
- 8075 Roero
- 8076 Foscarini
- 8077 Hoyle
- 8078 Carolejordan
- 8079 Bernardlovell
- 8080 Intel
- 8081 Leopardi
- 8082 Haynes
- 8083 Mayeda
- 8084 Dallas
- 8086 Peterthomas
- 8087 Kazutaka
- 8088 Australia
- 8089 Yukar
- 8096 Émilezola
- 8097 Yamanishi
- 8098 Miyamotoatsushi
- 8099 Okudoiyoshimi
- 8100 Nobeyama
- 8101 Yasue
- 8102 Yoshikazu
- 8103 Fermi
- 8104 Kumamori
- 8106 Carpino
- 8108 Wieland
- 8109 Danielwilliam
- 8110 Heath
- 8111 Hoepli
- 8112 Cesi
- 8113 Matsue
- 8114 Lafcadio
- 8115 Sakabe
- 8116 Jeanperrin
- 8117 Yuanlongping
- 8120 Kobe
- 8121 Altdorfer
- 8122 Holbein
- 8123 Canaletto
- 8124 Guardi
- 8125 Tyndareus
- 8126 Chanwainam
- 8127 Beuf
- 8128 Nicomachus
- 8129 Michaelbusch
- 8130 Seeberg
- 8131 Scanlon
- 8132 Vitginzburg
- 8133 Takanochoei
- 8134 Minin
- 8135 Davidmitchell
- 8136 Landis
- 8137 Kvíz
- 8138 Craigbowers
- 8139 Paulabell
- 8140 Hardersen
- 8141 Nikolaev
- 8142 Zolotov
- 8143 Nezval
- 8144 Hiragagennai
- 8145 Valujki
- 8146 Jimbell
- 8147 Colemanhawkins
- 8148 Golding
- 8149 Ruff
- 8150 Kaluga
- 8151 Andranada
- 8152 Martinlee
- 8153 Gattacceca
- 8154 Stahl
- 8155 Battaglini
- 8156 Tsukada
- 8158 Herder
- 8159 Fukuoka
- 8160 Petererwin
- 8161 Newman
- 8163 Ishizaki
- 8164 Andreasdoppler
- 8165 Gnädig
- 8166 Buczynski
- 8167 Ishii
- 8168 Rogerbourke
- 8169 Mirabeau
- 8171 Stauffenberg
- 8175 Boerhaave
- 8181 Rossini
- 8182 Akita
- 8184 Luderic
- 8187 Akiramisawa
- 8188 Okegaya
- 8189 Naruke
- 8190 Bouguer
- 8191 Mersenne
- 8192 Tonucci
- 8193 Ciaurro
- 8194 Satake
- 8195 Tamkin
- 8197 Mizunohiroshi
- 8199 Takagitakeo
- 8200 Souten
- 8202 Gooley
- 8203 Jogolehmann
- 8204 Takabatake
- 8205 Van Dijck
- 8206 Masayuki
- 8207 Suminao
- 8208 Volta
- 8209 Toscanelli
- 8210 NANTEN
- 8212 Naoshigetani
- 8214 Mirellalilli
- 8215 Zanonato
- 8216 Melosh
- 8217 Dominikhašek
- 8218 Hosty
- 8220 Nanyou
- 8221 La Condamine
- 8222 Gellner
- 8223 Bradshaw
- 8224 Fultonwright
- 8225 Emerson
- 8229 Kozelský
- 8230 Perona
- 8231 Tetsujiyamada
- 8232 Akiramizuno
- 8233 Asada
- 8234 Nobeoka
- 8235 Fragonard
- 8236 Gainsborough
- 8237 Constable
- 8238 Courbet
- 8239 Signac
- 8240 Matisse
- 8241 Agrius
- 8242 Joshemery
- 8243 Devonburr
- 8244 Mikolaichuk
- 8245 Molnar
- 8246 Kotov
- 8247 Cherylhall
- 8248 Gurzuf
- 8249 Gershwin
- 8250 Cornell
- 8251 Isogai
- 8252 Elkins-Tanton
- 8253 Brunetto
- 8254 Moskovitz
- 8255 Masiero
- 8256 Shenzhou
- 8257 Andycheng
- 8258 McCracken
- 8260 Momcheva
- 8261 Ceciliejulie
- 8262 Carcich
- 8266 Bertelli
- 8267 Kiss
- 8268 Goerdeler
- 8269 Calandrelli
- 8270 Winslow
- 8271 Imai
- 8272 Iitatemura
- 8273 Apatheia
- 8274 Soejima
- 8275 Inca
- 8276 Shigei
- 8277 Machu-Picchu
- 8278 Ooyanagi
- 8279 Cuzco
- 8280 Petergruber
- 8282 Delp
- 8283 Edinburgh
- 8284 Cranach
- 8286 Kouji
- 8289 An-Eefje
- 8291 Bingham
- 8294 Takayuki
- 8295 Toshifukushima
- 8296 Miyama
- 8297 Gérardfaure
- 8298 Loubna
- 8299 Téaleoni
- 8300 Iga
- 8301 Haseyuji
- 8302 Kazukin
- 8303 Miyaji
- 8304 Ryomichico
- 8305 Teika
- 8306 Shoko
- 8307 Peltan
- 8308 Julie-Mélissa
- 8309 Jedidahisler
- 8310 Seelos
- 8311 Zhangdaning
- 8313 Christiansen
- 8314 Tsuji
- 8315 Bajin
- 8316 Wolkenstein
- 8317 Eurysaces
- 8318 Averroes
- 8319 Antiphanes
- 8320 van Zee
- 8321 Akim
- 8322 Kononovich
- 8323 Krimigis
- 8324 Juliadeleón
- 8325 Trigo-Rodriguez
- 8326 Paulkling
- 8327 Weihenmayer
- 8328 Uyttenhove
- 8329 Speckman
- 8330 Fitzroy
- 8331 Dawkins
- 8332 Ivantsvetaev
- 8333 Medina
- 8335 Sarton
- 8336 Šafařík
- 8338 Ralhan
- 8339 Kosovichia
- 8340 Mumma
- 8343 Tugendhat
- 8344 Babette
- 8345 Ulmerspatz
- 8347 Lallaward
- 8348 Bhattacharyya
- 8353 Megryan
- 8355 Masuo
- 8356 Wadhwa
- 8357 O'Connor
- 8358 Rickblakley
- 8367 Bokusui
- 8368 Lamont
- 8369 Miyata
- 8370 Vanlindt
- 8371 Goven
- 8373 Stephengould
- 8374 Horohata
- 8375 Kenzokohno
- 8377 Elmerreese
- 8378 Sweeney
- 8379 Straczynski
- 8380 Tooting
- 8381 Hauptmann
- 8382 Mann
- 8386 Vanvinckenroye
- 8387 Fujimori
- 8391 Kring
- 8393 Tetsumasakamoto
- 8395 Rembaut
- 8397 Chiakitanaka
- 8398 Rubbia
- 8399 Wakamatsu
- 8400 Tomizo
- 8401 Assirelli
- 8403 Minorushimizu
- 8405 Asbolus
- 8406 Iwaokusano
- 8407 Houlahan
- 8408 Strom
- 8409 Valentaugustus
- 8410 Hiroakiohno
- 8411 Celso
- 8412 Zhaozhongxian
- 8413 Kawakami
- 8414 Atsuko
- 8416 Okada
- 8417 Lancetaylor
- 8418 Mogamigawa
- 8419 Terumikazumi
- 8420 Angrogna
- 8421 Montanari
- 8422 Mohorovičıć
- 8423 Macao
- 8424 Toshitsumita
- 8425 Zirankexuejijin
- 8428 Okiko
- 8430 Florey
- 8431 Haseda
- 8432 Tamakasuga
- 8433 Brachyrhynchus
- 8434 Columbianus
- 8435 Anser
- 8436 Leucopsis
- 8437 Bernicla
- 8438 Marila
- 8439 Albellus
- 8440 Wigeon
- 8441 Lapponica
- 8442 Ostralegus
- 8443 Svecica
- 8444 Popovich
- 8445 Novotroitskoe
- 8446 Tazieff
- 8447 Cornejo
- 8448 Belyakina
- 8449 Maslovets
- 8450 Egorov
- 8451 Gaidai
- 8452 Clay
- 8453 Flaviataldini
- 8454 Micheleferrero
- 8455 Johnrayner
- 8456 Davegriep
- 8457 Billgolisch
- 8458 Georgekoenig
- 8459 Larsbergknut
- 8460 Imainamahoe
- 8461 Sammiepung
- 8462 Hazelsears
- 8463 Naomimurdoch
- 8464 Polishook
- 8465 Bancelin
- 8466 Leyrat
- 8467 Benoîtcarry
- 8468 Rhondastroud
- 8470 Dudinskaya
- 8471 Obrant
- 8472 Tarroni
- 8474 Rettig
- 8475 Vsevoivanov
- 8477 Andrejkiselev
- 8479 Held
- 8482 Wayneolm
- 8483 Kinwalaniihsia
- 8485 Satoru
- 8486 Asherschel
- 8487 Takedashin
- 8488 d'Argens
- 8489 Boulder
- 8490 Akiehashimoto
- 8491 Joelle-gilles
- 8492 Kikuoka
- 8493 Yachibozu
- 8494 Edpatvega
- 8496 Jandlsmith
- 8498 Ufa
- 8500 Hori
- 8501 Wachholz
- 8502 Bauhaus
- 8503 Masakatsu
- 8515 Corvan
- 8516 Hyakkai
- 8521 Boulainvilliers
- 8523 Bouillabaisse
- 8524 Paoloruffini
- 8525 Nielsabel
- 8526 Takeuchiyukou
- 8527 Katayama
- 8529 Sinzi
- 8530 Korbokkur
- 8531 Mineosaito
- 8533 Oohira
- 8534 Knutsson
- 8535 Pellesvanslös
- 8536 Måns
- 8537 Billochbull
- 8538 Gammelmaja
- 8539 Laban
- 8540 Ardeberg
- 8541 Schalkenmehren
- 8543 Tsunemi
- 8544 Sigenori
- 8545 McGee
- 8546 Kenmotsu
- 8548 Sumizihara
- 8549 Alcide
- 8550 Hesiodos
- 8551 Daitarabochi
- 8552 Hyoichi
- 8553 Bradsmith
- 8554 Gabreta
- 8555 Mirimao
- 8556 Jana
- 8557 Šaroun
- 8558 Hack
- 8560 Tsubaki
- 8561 Sikoruk
- 8564 Anomalocaris
- 8568 Larrywilson
- 8569 Mameli
- 8571 Taniguchi
- 8572 Nijo
- 8573 Ivanka
- 8574 Makotoirie
- 8575 Seishitakeuchi
- 8577 Choseikomori
- 8578 Shojikato
- 8579 Hieizan
- 8580 Pinsky
- 8581 Johnen
- 8582 Kazuhisa
- 8583 Froberger
- 8585 Purpurea
- 8586 Epops
- 8587 Ruficollis
- 8588 Avosetta
- 8589 Stellaris
- 8590 Pygargus
- 8591 Excubitor
- 8592 Rubetra
- 8593 Angustirostris
- 8594 Albifrons
- 8595 Dougallii
- 8596 Alchata
- 8597 Sandvicensis
- 8598 Tetrix
- 8599 Riparia
- 8600 Arundinaceus
- 8601 Ciconia
- 8602 Oedicnemus
- 8603 Senator
- 8604 Vanier
- 8608 Chelomey
- 8609 Shuvalov
- 8610 Goldhaber
- 8611 Judithgoldhaber
- 8612 Burov
- 8613 Cindyschulz
- 8614 Svedhem
- 8615 Philipgrahamgood
- 8616 Fogelquist
- 8617 Fellous
- 8618 Sethjacobson
- 8620 Lowkevrudolph
- 8621 Jimparsons
- 8622 Mayimbialik
- 8623 Johnnygalecki
- 8624 Kaleycuoco
- 8625 Simonhelberg
- 8626 Melissarauch
- 8627 Kunalnayyar
- 8628 Davidsaltzberg
- 8629 Chucklorre
- 8630 Billprady
- 8631 Sherikboonstra
- 8632 Egleston
- 8633 Keisukenagao
- 8634 Neubauer
- 8635 Yuriosipov
- 8636 Malvina
- 8639 Vonšovský
- 8640 Ritaschulz
- 8642 Shawnkerry
- 8643 Quercus
- 8644 Betulapendula
- 8647 Populus
- 8648 Salix
- 8649 Juglans
- 8651 Alineraynal
- 8652 Acacia
- 8656 Cupressus
- 8657 Cedrus
- 8660 Sano
- 8661 Ratzinger
- 8663 Davidjohnston
- 8664 Grigorijrichters
- 8665 Daun-Eifel
- 8666 Reuter
- 8667 Fontane
- 8668 Satomimura
- 8672 Morse
- 8676 Lully
- 8677 Charlier
- 8678 Bäl
- 8679 Tingstäde
- 8680 Rone
- 8681 Burs
- 8682 Kräklingbo
- 8683 Sjölander
- 8684 Reichwein
- 8685 Fauré
- 8686 Akenside
- 8687 Caussols
- 8688 Delaunay
- 8690 Swindle
- 8691 Etsuko
- 8693 Matsuki
- 8695 Bergvall
- 8696 Kjeriksson
- 8697 Olofsson
- 8698 Bertilpettersson
- 8700 Gevaert
- 8702 Nakanishi
- 8703 Nakanotadao
- 8704 Sadakane
- 8706 Takeyama
- 8707 Arakihiroshi
- 8709 Kadlu
- 8710 Hawley
- 8711 Lukeasher
- 8712 Suzuko
- 8713 Azusa
- 8716 Ginestra
- 8717 Richviktorov
- 8719 Vesmír
- 8720 Takamizawa
- 8721 AMOS
- 8722 Schirra
- 8723 Azumayama
- 8724 Junkoehara
- 8725 Keiko
- 8726 Masamotonasu
- 8728 Mimatsu
- 8729 Descour
- 8730 Iidesan
- 8731 Tejima
- 8732 Champion
- 8733 Ohsugi
- 8734 Warner
- 8735 Yoshiosakai
- 8736 Shigehisa
- 8737 Takehiro
- 8738 Saji
- 8739 Morihisa
- 8740 Václav
- 8741 Suzukisuzuko
- 8742 Bonazzoli
- 8743 Kèneke
- 8744 Cilla
- 8745 Delaney
- 8747 Asahi
- 8749 Beatles
- 8750 Nettarufina
- 8751 Nigricollis
- 8752 Flammeus
- 8753 Nycticorax
- 8754 Leucorodia
- 8755 Querquedula
- 8756 Mollissima
- 8757 Cyaneus
- 8758 Perdix
- 8759 Porzana
- 8760 Crex
- 8761 Crane
- 8762 Hiaticula
- 8763 Pugnax
- 8764 Gallinago
- 8765 Limosa
- 8766 Niger
- 8767 Commontern
- 8768 Barnowl
- 8769 Arctictern
- 8770 Totanus
- 8771 Biarmicus
- 8772 Minutus
- 8773 Torquilla
- 8774 Viridis
- 8775 Cristata
- 8776 Campestris
- 8777 Torquata
- 8780 Forte
- 8781 Yurka
- 8782 Bakhrakh
- 8783 Gopasyuk
- 8785 Boltwood
- 8786 Belskaya
- 8787 Ignatenko
- 8788 Labeyrie
- 8789 Effertz
- 8790 Michaelamato
- 8791 Donyabradshaw
- 8792 Christyljohnson
- 8793 Thomasmüller
- 8794 Joepatterson
- 8795 Dudorov
- 8796 Sonnett
- 8797 Duffard
- 8798 Tarantino
- 8799 Barnouin
- 8800 Brophy
- 8801 Nugent
- 8802 Negley
- 8803 Kolyer
- 8804 Eliason
- 8805 Petrpetrov
- 8806 Fetisov
- 8807 Schenk
- 8808 Luhmann
- 8809 Roversimonaco
- 8810 Johnmcfarland
- 8811 Waltherschmadel
- 8812 Kravtsov
- 8813 Leviathan
- 8814 Rosseven
- 8815 Deanregas
- 8816 Gamow
- 8817 Roytraver
- 8818 Hermannbondi
- 8819 Chrisbondi
- 8820 Anjandersen
- 8822 Shuryanka
- 8824 Genta
- 8826 Corneville
- 8827 Kollwitz
- 8829 Buczkowski
- 8831 Brändström
- 8832 Altenrath
- 8833 Acer
- 8834 Anacardium
- 8835 Annona
- 8836 Aquifolium
- 8837 London
- 8839 Novichkova
- 8842 Bennetmcinnes
- 8847 Huch
- 8849 Brighton
- 8850 Bignonia
- 8851 Okudamasakata
- 8852 Buxus
- 8853 Gerdlehmann
- 8855 Miwa
- 8856 Celastrus
- 8857 Cercidiphyllum
- 8858 Cornus
- 8860 Rohloff
- 8861 Jenskandler
- 8862 Takayukiota
- 8864 Aikawa
- 8865 Yakiimo
- 8866 Tanegashima
- 8867 Tubbiolo
- 8868 Hjorter
- 8869 Olausgutho
- 8870 von Zeipel
- 8871 Svanberg
- 8872 Ebenum
- 8874 Showashinzan
- 8875 Fernie
- 8877 Rentaro
- 8881 Prialnik
- 8882 Sakaetamura
- 8883 Miyazakihayao
- 8885 Sette
- 8886 Elaeagnus
- 8887 Scheeres
- 8888 Tartaglia
- 8889 Mockturtle
- 8890 Montaigne
- 8891 Irokawa
- 8892 Kakogawa
- 8895 Nha
- 8897 Defelice
- 8898 Linnaea
- 8899 Hughmiller
- 8900 AAVSO
- 8903 Paulcruikshank
- 8904 Yoshihara
- 8905 Bankakuko
- 8906 Yano
- 8907 Takaji
- 8909 Ohnishitaka
- 8911 Kawaguchijun
- 8912 Ohshimatake
- 8913 Shohinighose
- 8914 Nickjames
- 8915 Sawaishujiro
- 8917 Tianjindaxue
- 8919 Ouyangziyuan
- 8922 Kumanodake
- 8923 Yamakawa
- 8924 Iruma
- 8925 Boattini
- 8926 Abemasanao
- 8927 Ryojiro
- 8929 Haginoshinji
- 8930 Kubota
- 8931 Hirokimatsuo
- 8932 Nagatomo
- 8933 Kurobe
- 8934 Nishimurajun
- 8935 Beccaria
- 8936 Gianni
- 8937 Gassan
- 8939 Onodajunjiro
- 8940 Yakushimaru
- 8941 Junsaito
- 8942 Takagi
- 8943 Stefanozavka
- 8944 Ortigara
- 8945 Cavaradossi
- 8946 Yoshimitsu
- 8947 Mizutani
- 8952 ODAS
- 8954 Baral
- 8957 Koujounotsuki
- 8958 Stargazer
- 8959 Oenanthe
- 8960 Luscinioides
- 8961 Schoenobaenus
- 8962 Noctua
- 8963 Collurio
- 8964 Corax
- 8965 Citrinella
- 8966 Hortulana
- 8967 Calandra
- 8968 Europaeus
- 8969 Alexandrinus
- 8970 Islandica
- 8971 Leucocephala
- 8972 Sylvatica
- 8973 Pratincola
- 8974 Gregaria
- 8975 Atthis
- 8976 Leucura
- 8977 Paludicola
- 8978 Barbatus
- 8979 Clanga
- 8980 Heliaca
- 8982 Oreshek
- 8983 Rayakazakova
- 8984 Derevyanko
- 8985 Tula
- 8986 Kineyayasuyo
- 8987 Cavancuddy
- 8988 Hansenkoharcheck
- 8990 Compassion
- 8991 Solidarity
- 8992 Magnanimity
- 8993 Ingstad
- 8994 Kashkashian
- 8995 Rachelstevenson
- 8996 Waynedwards
- 8997 Davidblewett
- 8998 Matthewizawa
- 8999 Tashadunn
back to top

== See also ==
- List of minor planet discoverers
- List of observatory codes
- Meanings of minor planet names § Index
