= 2169 Taiwan =

Astridian asteroid

Discovery
- Discovered by: Purple Mountain Obs.
- Discovery site: Purple Mountain Obs.
- Discovery date: 9 November 1964

Designations
- Named after: Taiwan
- Alternative designations: 1964 VP_{1} · 1938 DV_{1} 1975 BH_{1} · 1977 RF_{8} 1979 FG
- Minor planet category: main-belt · (middle); Astrid

Orbital characteristics
- Epoch 4 September 2017 (JD 2458000.5)
- Uncertainty parameter 0
- Observation arc: 79.28 yr (28,957 days)
- Aphelion: 2.9244 AU
- Perihelion: 2.6564 AU
- Semi-major axis: 2.7904 AU
- Eccentricity: 0.0480
- Orbital period (sidereal): 4.66 yr (1,703 days)
- Mean anomaly: 116.98°
- Mean motion: 0° 12^{m} 41.4^{s} / day
- Inclination: 1.5286°
- Longitude of ascending node: 71.855°
- Argument of perihelion: 358.45°

Physical characteristics
- Dimensions: 14.39 km (calculated); 16.52±4.57 km 17.96±4.92 km 18.22±0.51 km 18.39±0.30 km 19.263±0.139 km
- Synodic rotation period: 7.252±0.0014 h
- Geometric albedo: 0.042±0.006; 0.0423±0.0059; 0.05±0.06; 0.05±0.07; 0.057 (assumed); 0.057±0.015; 0.085±0.005
- Spectral type: SMASS = C · C
- Absolute magnitude (H): 12.00 · 12.40 · 12.488±0.003 (R) · 12.50 · 12.59±0.32 · 12.6 · 12.69 · 12.94

2169 Taiwan, provisional designation 1964 VP_{1}, is a carbonaceous Astridian asteroid from the central regions of the asteroid belt, approximately 17 kilometers in diameter. It was discovered on 9 November 1964, by astronomers at the Purple Mountain Observatory near Nanking, China. It was named for Taiwan.

== Orbit and classification ==
Taiwan is a member of the Astrid family (515), a smaller asteroid family of nearly 500 carbonaceous asteroids. The family is located in the outermost central main-belt, near a prominent Kirkwood gap, that marks the 5:2 orbital resonance with Jupiter, and divides the asteroid belt into a central and outer part.

Taiwan orbits the Sun at a distance of 2.7–2.9 AU once every 4 years and 8 months (1,703 days). Its orbit has an eccentricity of 0.05 and an inclination of 2° with respect to the ecliptic.

The body's observation arc begins with its first identification as 1938 DV_{1} at Heidelberg Observatory in February 1938, almost 27 years prior to its official discovery observation at Nanking.

== Physical characteristics ==
In the SMASS classification, and according to PanSTARRS photometric survey, Taiwan is a carbonaceous C-type asteroid.

=== Rotation period ===
In September 2010, a rotational lightcurve of Taiwan was obtained from photometric observations in the R-band by astronomers at the Palomar Transient Factory in California. Lightcurve analysis gave a rotation period of 7.252 hours with a brightness variation of 0.17 magnitude (U=2).

=== Diameter and albedo ===
According to the surveys carried out by the Japanese Akari satellite and the NEOWISE mission of NASA's Wide-field Infrared Survey Explorer, Taiwan measures between 16.52 and 19.263 kilometers in diameter and its surface has an albedo between 0.042 and 0.085.

The Collaborative Asteroid Lightcurve Link assumes a standard albedo for carbonaceous asteroids of 0.057 and calculates a diameter of 14.39 kilometers based on an absolute magnitude of 12.94.

== Naming ==
This minor planet was named after the Taiwan Province. The official naming citation was published by the Minor Planet Center on 1 February 1980 (M.P.C. 5184).
