= 2197 Shanghai =

Asteroid

Discovery
- Discovered by: Purple Mountain Obs.
- Discovery site: Purple Mountain Obs.
- Discovery date: 30 December 1965

Designations
- Named after: Shanghai (Chinese city)
- Alternative designations: 1965 YN · 1942 VN; 1955 DA · 1964 UN; 1967 JT · 1975 SD
- Minor planet category: main-belt · Themis

Orbital characteristics
- Epoch 4 September 2017 (JD 2458000.5)
- Uncertainty parameter 0
- Observation arc: 62.10 yr (22,682 days)
- Aphelion: 3.5508 AU
- Perihelion: 2.7595 AU
- Semi-major axis: 3.1551 AU
- Eccentricity: 0.1254
- Orbital period (sidereal): 5.60 yr (2,047 days)
- Mean anomaly: 60.923°
- Mean motion: 0° 10^{m} 33.24^{s} / day
- Inclination: 2.4980°
- Longitude of ascending node: 56.369°
- Argument of perihelion: 70.991°

Physical characteristics
- Dimensions: 20.198±0.136 km 20.20±0.14 km 22.23 km (derived); 23.88±0.70 km
- Synodic rotation period: 5.9384±0.0023 h 5.99±0.05 h
- Geometric albedo: 0.0898 (derived); 0.106±0.007; 0.119±0.014
- Spectral type: C
- Absolute magnitude (H): 11.20 · 11.40 · 11.304±0.001 (R) · 11.5 · 11.54±0.19

2197 Shanghai, provisional designation 1965 YN, is a carbonaceous Themistian asteroid from the outer region of the asteroid belt, approximately 22 kilometers in diameter.

The asteroid was discovered on 30 December 1965, by astronomers at the Purple Mountain Observatory in Nanjing, China, and named after the city of Shanghai.

== Orbit and classification ==
Shanghai is a member of the Themis family, a dynamical family of outer-belt asteroids with nearly coplanar ecliptical orbits. It orbits the Sun at a distance of 2.8–3.6 AU once every 5 years and 7 months (2,047 days). Its orbit has an eccentricity of 0.13 and an inclination of 2° with respect to the ecliptic.

== Physical characteristics ==
The dark body has been characterized as a C-type asteroid.

=== Rotation period ===
In December 2010, a rotational lightcurve of Shanghai was obtained for this asteroid from photometric observations taken at the U.S. Palomar Transient Factory in California. It gave a rotation period of 5.9384 hours with a brightness variation of 0.16 magnitude (U=2).

One month later in January 2011, a similar period of 5.99 hours with an amplitude of 0.16 magnitude was derived by French amateur astronomer Pierre Antonini (U=2).

=== Diameter and albedo ===
According to the surveys carried out by the Japanese Akari satellite and NASA's Wide-field Infrared Survey Explorer with its subsequent NEOWISE mission, Shanghai measures 20.2 and 23.9 kilometers in diameter and its surface has an albedo of 0.119 and 0.106, respectively. The Collaborative Asteroid Lightcurve Link derives an albedo of 0.0898 and a diameter of 22.2 kilometers with an absolute magnitude of 11.5.

== Naming ==
This minor planet is named after Shanghai, the most populous city of China (pop. 24 million as of 2014). Located in the Yangtze River Delta in eastern China, it has the world's busiest container port. The official naming citation was published by the Minor Planet Center on 1 June 1981 (M.P.C. 6059).
