= 2903 Zhuhai =

Main-belt asteroid

Discovery
- Discovered by: Purple Mountain Obs.
- Discovery site: Purple Mountain Obs.
- Discovery date: 23 October 1981

Designations
- Named after: Zhuhai (Chinese city)
- Alternative designations: 1981 UV_{9} · 1955 MC; 1973 UK_{4} · 1975 GC; 1977 TN_{7} · 1977 VL_{2}
- Minor planet category: main-belt · (middle) background · Maria

Orbital characteristics
- Epoch 23 March 2018 (JD 2458200.5)
- Uncertainty parameter 0
- Observation arc: 62.44 yr (22,808 d)
- Aphelion: 2.7128 AU
- Perihelion: 2.4104 AU
- Semi-major axis: 2.5616 AU
- Eccentricity: 0.0590
- Orbital period (sidereal): 4.10 yr (1,497 d)
- Mean anomaly: 236.34°
- Mean motion: 0° 14^{m} 25.44^{s} / day
- Inclination: 14.350°
- Longitude of ascending node: 232.57°
- Argument of perihelion: 243.97°

Physical characteristics
- Mean diameter: 13.58±0.90 km 13.581±0.896 km 14.01±0.86 km
- Synodic rotation period: 5.263±0.002 h 5.268±0.003 h 6.152 h
- Geometric albedo: 0.146±0.020; 0.20 (assumed); 0.276±0.141
- Spectral type: S
- Absolute magnitude (H): 11.35; 11.60±0.40; 11.7; 12.00

2903 Zhuhai, provisional designation 1981 UV_{9}, is a stony background or Marian asteroid from the central regions of the asteroid belt, approximately 14 kilometers (8.7 miles) in diameter. It was discovered on 23 October 1981, by astronomers at Purple Mountain Observatory near Nanjing, China. The S-type asteroid has a rotation period of 5.26 hours. It was named for the Chinese city of Zhuhai.

== Orbit and classification ==
Based on osculating Keplerian orbital elements, Zhuhai has also been classified as a member of the Maria family (506), a large family of stony asteroids, named after 170 Maria. When applying the hierarchical clustering method to its proper orbital elements, the asteroid is both a non-family asteroid of the main belt's background population (according to Nesvorný), as well as a core member of the Maria family (according to Milani and Knežević).

It orbits the Sun in the central main-belt at a distance of 2.4–2.7 AU once every 4 years and 1 month (1,497 days; semi-major axis of 2.56 AU). Its orbit has an eccentricity of 0.06 and an inclination of 14° with respect to the ecliptic. The body's observation arc begins with its first observation as 1955 MC at Goethe Link Observatory in June 1955, or 26 years prior to its official discovery observation at Nanjing.

== Physical characteristics ==
Zhuhai has been characterized as a common, stony S-type asteroid by Pan-STARRS photometric survey.

=== Rotation period ===
Until 2012, three rotational lightcurves of Zhuhai have been obtained from photometric observations. Best-rated lightcurve from the Oakley Southern Sky Observatory gave a well-defined rotation period of 5.263 hours with a brightness amplitude of 0.32 magnitude (U=3).

=== Diameter and albedo ===
According to the surveys carried out by the Japanese Akari satellite and the NEOWISE mission of NASA's Wide-field Infrared Survey Explorer, Zhuhai measures between 13.58 and 14.01 kilometers in diameter and its surface has an albedo between 0.146 and 0.276. The Collaborative Asteroid Lightcurve Link assumes a standard albedo for stony asteroids of 0.20 and calculates a diameter of 13.58 kilometers based on an absolute magnitude of 11.7.

== Naming ==
This minor planet was named after the city of located in the Guangdong province of southern China. The official naming citation was published by the Minor Planet Center on 11 March 1990 (M.P.C. 16041).
