= 3494 Purple Mountain =

Asteroid

Discovery
- Discovered by: Purple Mountain Obs.
- Discovery site: Purple Mountain Obs.
- Discovery date: 7 December 1980

Designations
- Named after: Purple Mountain Observatory (Discovering observatory)
- Alternative designations: 1980 XW · 1962 WV_{1} 1969 UD · 1972 OA
- Minor planet category: main-belt · (inner); Vesta · Flora

Orbital characteristics
- Epoch 23 March 2018 (JD 2458200.5)
- Uncertainty parameter 0
- Observation arc: 66.38 yr (24,247 d)
- Aphelion: 2.6571 AU
- Perihelion: 2.0419 AU
- Semi-major axis: 2.3495 AU
- Eccentricity: 0.1309
- Orbital period (sidereal): 3.60 yr (1,315 d)
- Mean anomaly: 237.24°
- Mean motion: 0° 16^{m} 25.32^{s} / day
- Inclination: 5.8320°
- Longitude of ascending node: 234.42°
- Argument of perihelion: 72.646°

Physical characteristics
- Mean diameter: 6.507±0.091 km 7.82 km (calculated)
- Synodic rotation period: 2.928±0.001 h (1/2-p.); 5.857±0.001 h
- Geometric albedo: 0.24 (assumed); 0.347±0.035
- Spectral type: V (SMASS-I Xu) · V S (assumed); S/SV (SDSS-MOC)
- Absolute magnitude (H): 12.7

3494 Purple Mountain, provisional designation 1980 XW, is a bright Vestian asteroid and a formerly lost minor planet from the inner regions of the asteroid belt, approximately 6.5 kilometers (4 miles) in diameter. First observed in 1962, it was officially discovered on 7 December 1980, by Chinese astronomers at the Purple Mountain Observatory in Nanking, China, and later named in honor of the discovering observatory. The V-type asteroid has a rotation period of 5.9 hours.

== Orbit and classification ==
Purple Mountain is a core member of the Vesta family (401), a giant asteroid family of typically bright V-type asteroids. Vestian asteroids have a composition akin to cumulate eucrites (HED meteorites) and are thought to have originated deep within 4 Vesta's crust, possibly from the Rheasilvia crater, a large impact crater on its southern hemisphere near the South pole, formed as a result of a subcatastrophic collision. Vesta is the main belt's second-largest and second-most-massive body after Ceres. Based on osculating Keplerian orbital elements, the asteroid has also been classified as a member of the Flora family (402), a giant asteroid family and the largest family of stony asteroids in the main-belt.

Purple Mountain orbits the Sun in the inner asteroid belt at a distance of 2.0–2.7 AU once every 3 years and 7 months (1,315 days; semi-major axis of 2.35 AU). Its orbit has an eccentricity of 0.13 and an inclination of 6° with respect to the ecliptic. The body's observation arc begins with a precovery taken at Palomar Observatory in December 1951, or 29 years prior to its official discovery observation.

=== Lost asteroid ===
Purple Mountain has been a lost minor planet. In November 1962, Purple Mountain was observed as 1962 WV_{1} at Goethe Link Observatory. A total of three additional observations were taken at Crimea–Nauchnij in 1969 and 1972, when it was designated as 1969 UD and 1972 OA, respectively, but was subsequently lost with no follow-up observations until its official discovery at Nanking in 1980.

== Physical characteristics ==
Based on the Moving Object Catalog (MOC) of the Sloan Digital Sky Survey, Purple Mountain is a common, stony S-type asteroid, with a sequential best-type taxonomy of SV. The Collaborative Asteroid Lightcurve Link (CALL) also assumes it to be a stony S-type.

In the SMASS-I classification by Xu, the asteroid is a V-type. This agrees with its measured high albedo (see below) often seen among the core members of the Vesta family. In 2013, a spectroscopic analysis showed it to have a composition very similar to the cumulate eucrite meteorites, which also suggests that the basaltic asteroid has originated from the crust of 4 Vesta.

=== Rotation period ===
In June 2015, a rotational lightcurve of Purple Mountain was obtained from photometric observations by astronomers at Texas A&M University, using the SARA-telescopes of the Southeastern Association for Research and Astronomy consortium. The 0.9-meter SARA-North telescope is located at Kitt Peak National Observatory, Arizona, while the 0.6-meter SARA-South telescope is hosted at the Cerro Tololo Inter-American Observatory in Chile. Lightcurve analysis gave a rotation period of 5.857 hours with a brightness variation of 0.32 magnitude (U=3-). One month later, in July 2015, another period of 2.928 hours and an amplitude of 0.40 magnitude was measured at MIT's George R. Wallace Jr. Observatory (U=2). The results are in good agreement, apart from the fact that the latter is an alternative, monomodal solution with half the period of the former. CALL adopts the longer, bimodal period solution as the better result in its Lightcurve Data Base, due to the lightcurve's distinct amplitude and the small phase angle of the first observation.

=== Diameter and albedo ===
According to the survey carried out by the NEOWISE mission of NASA's Wide-field Infrared Survey Explorer, Purple Mountain measures 6.507 kilometers in diameter and its surface has an albedo of 0.347, while CALL assumes an albedo of 0.24 – derived from the body's classification into the Flora family – and consequently calculates a larger diameter of 7.82 kilometers based on an absolute magnitude of 12.7.

== Naming ==
This minor planet was named in honor of the Purple Mountain Observatory (PMO), an astronomical observatory located in Nanking (Nanjing), China. Built in 1934, the observatory is known for its astrometric observations and for its numerous discoveries of small Solar System bodies. It has played an important role in developing modern Chinese astronomy. The official naming citation was published by the Minor Planet Center on 29 November 1993 (M.P.C. 22829).
