= Purple Mountain Observatory =

Astronomical observatory in China

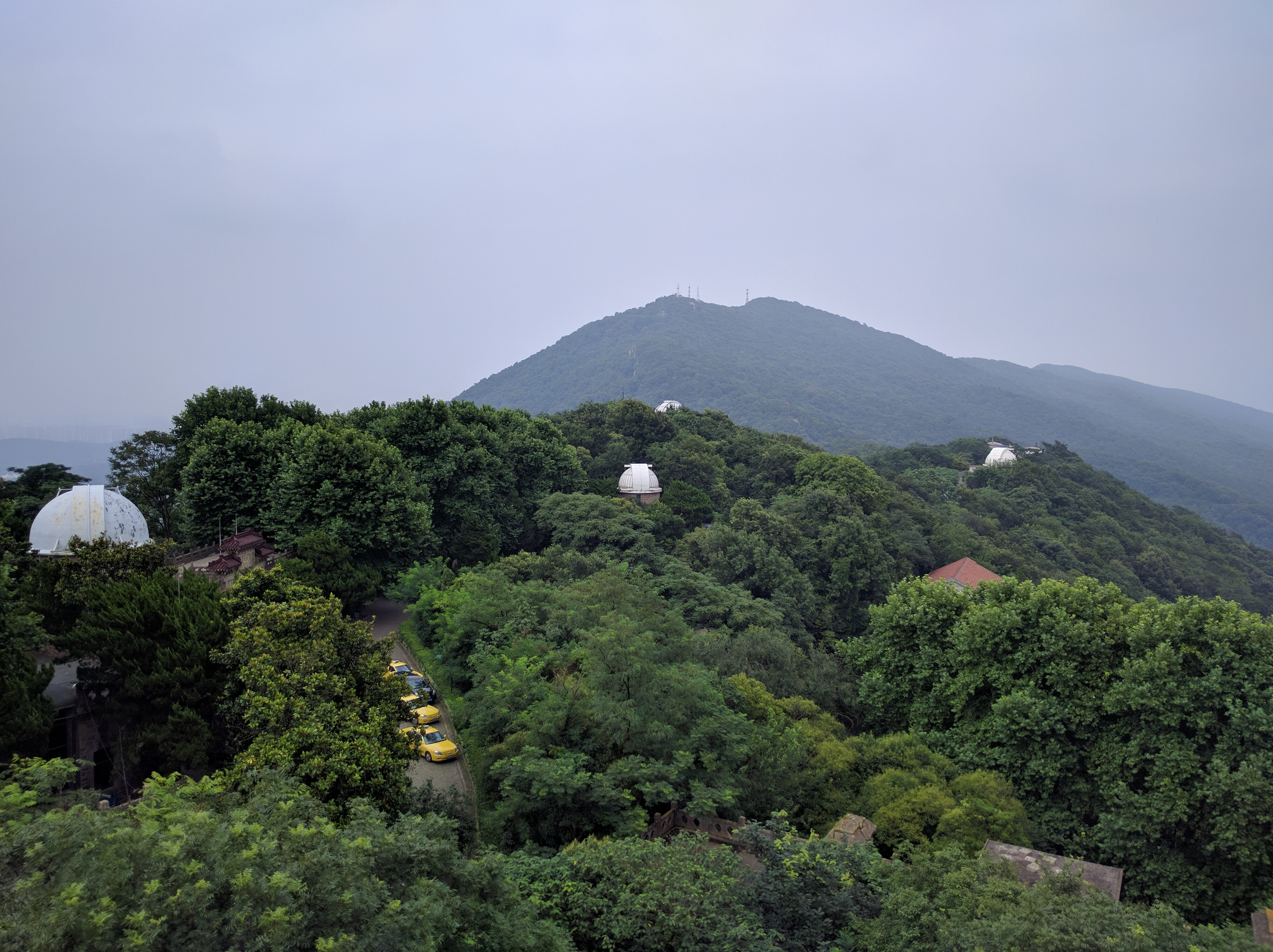
- Purple Mountain Observatory Nanjing facilities
- Alternative names: Cradle of Modern Astronomy
- Organization: Chinese Academy of Sciences
- Observatory code: 330
- Location: Xuanwu District, Nanjing, Jiangsu
- Coordinates: 32°03′54″N 118°49′47″E
- Altitude: 267 m (876 ft)
- Established: 1934
- Website: www.pmo.cas.cn
- Telescopes: Hainan Island station; Purple Mountain Observatory, Xuyi Station; Purple Mountain Observatory, Yao'an Station
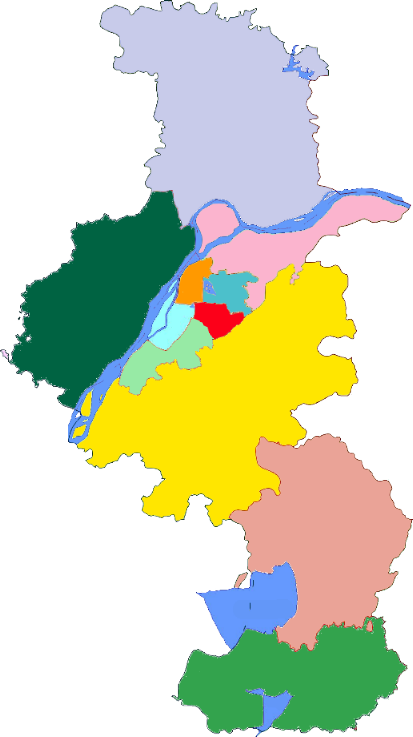
- Location within Nanjing
- Related media on Commons

Purple Mountain Observatory, (Note: Chinese: 紫金山天文台; pinyin: Zǐjīnshān Tiānwéntái) also known as Zijinshan Astronomical Observatory, is a dual-use astronomical observatory operated by the Chinese Academy of Sciences (CAS) and the People's Liberation Army Aerospace Force (PLAASF). It is headquartered at Purple Mountain, east of Nanjing, with off-site sensor installations located across the country. The observatory has a very active open science role, serving as China's primary contribution to the Inter-Agency Space Debris Coordination Committee, global asteroid impact avoidance efforts, and calculating the official Chinese calendar. Since the early 2000s, the observatory has gained a significant classified intelligence role, serving as China's primary optical space domain awareness capability. At least part of the military component is operated by PLAASF Base 26 as the Space Target and Debris Observation and Research Center.

== History ==
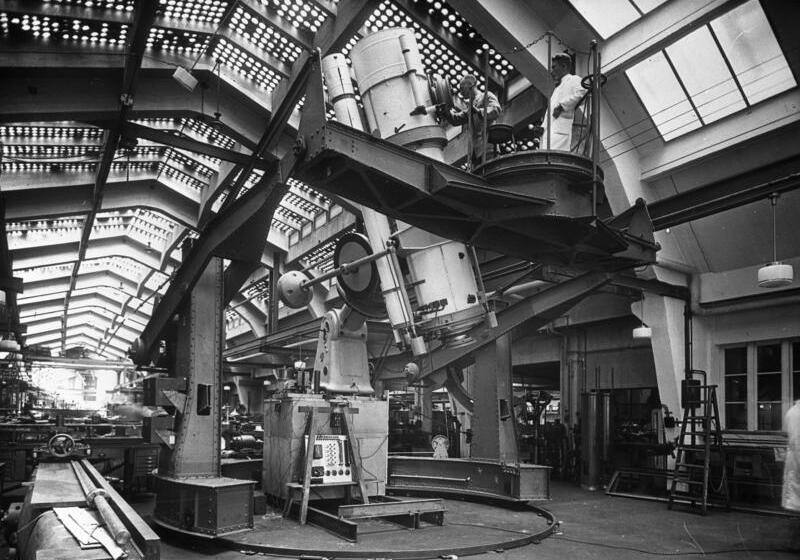
The 60-cm Zeiss reflector at Nanking in 1930

The Purple Mountain Observatory was established in 1934 funded by the Nationalist Government of the Republic of China and administered by Academia Sinica. The longtime director of the observatory from 1950 to 1984 was Chinese astronomer Zhang Yuzhe. By the late 1980s, increasing light pollution in Nanjing meant Purple Mountain was no longer viable as a working observatory. It has since shifted its focus to public education, with much of the actual scientific work being carried out in its five branch observatories located at Qinghai (in Delingha), Ganyu, Xuyi, Honghe (in Jiamusi), and Qingdao.

The Minor Planet Center credits the observatory with the discovery of 149 minor planets between 1955 and 1983, while the observatory's PMO NEO Survey Program is credited with more than 600 discoveries between 2006 and 2013.

In August 2026, it was reported that the New Zealand Security Intelligence Service disrupted a plan by Purple Mountain Observatory to install ground-based space infrastructure in New Zealand that could collect intelligence of military value.

=== Discoveries ===
The observatory discovered the periodic comets 60P/Tsuchinshan and 62P/Tsuchinshan, as well as the non-periodic C/1977 V1 (Tsuchinshan), also known as Comet 1977 X, C/2017 E2, and C/2023 A3 (Tsuchinshan-ATLAS). They are named after the postal romanization of the name (Wade–Giles: Tzu-chin-shan; pinyin: Zǐjīnshān). Many asteroids were also discovered, including the Trojan asteroids 2223 Sarpedon, 2260 Neoptolemus, 2363 Cebriones, 2456 Palamedes, and the eponymous 3494 Purple Mountain.

=== Near-Earth object survey ===
The Chinese Near-Earth Object Survey (CNEOS), based at the Xuyi Station (D29) in Xuyi, Jiangsu, started observations in 2006. It uses a 1:04=1:20=1:80 m Schmidt telescope equipped with a 4K × 4K CCD detector with the drift-scanning function. As of August 2012, the program has observed 149,971 asteroids, found 1,279 new provisional designation asteroids, and cataloged 251 numbered asteroids including five Jupiter trojans, two Hildian, and one Phocaea asteroid. The program has also observed the position of 824 near-Earth objects (NEOs) and discovered four new ones: the Apollo asteroid (285339) 1999 JR_{6}, and the three Amor asteroid (410195) 2007 RT_{147}, (388567) 2007 QX_{14}, and (468681) 2009 MZ_{6}.

=== List of discovered minor planets (1955–1983) ===
Minor planets discovered: 149
see § List of discovered minor planets

A total of 149 minor planets were discovered by the Purple Mountain Observatory between 1955 and 1983.

1125 China	30 October 1957	list
1802 Zhang Heng	9 October 1964	list
1888 Zu Chong-Zhi	9 November 1964	list
1972 Yi Xing	9 November 1964	list
2012 Guo Shou-Jing	9 October 1964	list
2027 Shen Guo	9 November 1964	list
2045 Peking	8 October 1964	list
2077 Kiangsu	18 December 1974	list
2078 Nanking	12 January 1975	list
2085 Henan	20 December 1965	list
2162 Anhui	30 January 1966	list
2169 Taiwan	9 November 1964	list
2184 Fujian	9 October 1964	list
2185 Guangdong	20 November 1965	list
2197 Shanghai	30 December 1965	list
2209 Tianjin	28 October 1978	list
2215 Sichuan	12 November 1964	list
2223 Sarpedon	4 October 1977	list
2230 Yunnan	29 October 1978	list
2255 Qinghai	3 November 1977	list
2260 Neoptolemus	26 November 1975	list
2263 Shaanxi	30 October 1978	list
2336 Xinjiang	26 November 1975	list
2344 Xizang	27 September 1979	list
2355 Nei Monggol	30 October 1978	list

2363 Cebriones	4 October 1977	list
2380 Heilongjiang	18 September 1965	list
2387 Xi'an	17 March 1975	list
2398 Jilin	24 October 1965	list
2425 Shenzhen	17 March 1975	list
2456 Palamedes	30 January 1966	list
2503 Liaoning	16 October 1965	list
2505 Hebei	31 October 1975	list
2510 Shandong	10 October 1979	list
2514 Taiyuan	8 October 1964	list
2515 Gansu	9 October 1964	list
2539 Ningxia	8 October 1964	list
2547 Hubei	9 October 1964	list
2592 Hunan	30 January 1966	list
2617 Jiangxi	26 November 1975	list
2631 Zhejiang	7 October 1980	list
2632 Guizhou	6 November 1980	list
2655 Guangxi	14 December 1974	list
2693 Yan'an	3 November 1977	list
2719 Suzhou	22 September 1965	list
2729 Urumqi	18 October 1979	list
2743 Chengdu	21 November 1965	list
2752 Wu Chien-Shiung	20 September 1965	list
2778 Tangshan	14 December 1979	list
2789 Foshan	6 December 1956	list

2790 Needham	19 October 1965	list
2851 Harbin	30 October 1978	list
2886 Tinkaping	20 December 1965	list
2899 Runrun Shaw	8 October 1964	list
2903 Zhuhai	23 October 1981	list
2963 Chen Jiageng	9 November 1964	list
3011 Chongqing	26 November 1978	list
3014 Huangsushu	11 October 1979	list
3024 Hainan	23 October 1981	list
3028 Zhangguoxi	9 October 1978	list
3048 Guangzhou	8 October 1964	list
3051 Nantong	19 December 1974	list
3088 Jinxiuzhonghua	24 October 1981	list
3089 Oujianquan	3 December 1981	list
3136 Anshan	18 November 1981	list
3139 Shantou	11 November 1980	list
3171 Wangshouguan	19 November 1979	list
3187 Dalian	10 October 1977	list
3206 Wuhan	13 November 1980	list
3221 Changshi	2 December 1981	list
3239 Meizhou	29 October 1978	list
3241 Yeshuhua	28 November 1978	list
3297 Hong Kong	26 November 1978	list
3335 Quanzhou	1 January 1966	list
3340 Yinhai	12 October 1979	list

3388 Tsanghinchi	21 December 1981	list
3405 Daiwensai	30 October 1964	list
3421 Yangchenning	26 November 1975	list
3443 Leetsungdao	26 September 1979	list
3462 Zhouguangzhao	25 October 1981	list
3463 Kaokuen	3 December 1981	list
3476 Dongguan	28 October 1978	list
3494 Purple Mountain	7 December 1980	list
3502 Huangpu	9 October 1964	list
3509 Sanshui	28 October 1978	list
3513 Quqinyue	16 October 1965	list
3542 Tanjiazhen	9 October 1964	list
3543 Ningbo	11 November 1964	list
3556 Lixiaohua	30 October 1964	list
3560 Chenqian	3 September 1980	list
3570 Wuyeesun	14 December 1979	list
3609 Liloketai	13 November 1980	list
3611 Dabu	20 December 1981	list
3613 Kunlun	10 November 1982	list
3643 Tienchanglin	29 October 1978	list
3650 Kunming	30 October 1978	list
3678 Mongmanwai	20 January 1966	list
3704 Gaoshiqi	20 December 1981	list
3729 Yangzhou	1 November 1983	list
3746 Heyuan	8 October 1964	list

3763 Qianxuesen	14 October 1980	list
3812 Lidaksum	11 January 1965	list
3844 Lujiaxi	30 January 1966	list
3901 Nanjingdaxue	7 April 1958	list
3960 Chaliubieju	20 January 1955	list
4047 Chang'E	8 October 1964	list
4073 Ruianzhongxue	23 October 1981	list
4245 Nairc	29 October 1981	list
4273 Dunhuang	29 October 1978	list
4360 Xuyi	9 October 1964	list
4431 Holeungholee	28 November 1978	list
4562 Poleungkuk	21 October 1979	list
4566 Chaokuangpiu	27 November 1981	list
4651 Wongkwancheng	31 October 1957	list
4730 Xingmingzhou	7 December 1980	list
4913 Wangxuan	20 September 1965	list
4925 Zhoushan	3 December 1981	list
4988 Chushuho	6 November 1980	list
5013 Suzhousanzhong	9 November 1964	list
5045 Hoyin	29 October 1978	list
5198 Fongyunwah	16 January 1975	list
5217 Chaozhou	13 February 1966	list
5267 Zegmott	13 February 1966	list
5273 Peilisheng	16 February 1982	list
5389 Choikaiyau	29 October 1981	list

5390 Huichiming	19 December 1981	list
5537 Sanya	9 October 1964	list
5538 Luichewoo	9 October 1964	list
5539 Limporyen	16 October 1965	list
5709 Tamyeunleung	12 October 1977	list
5892 Milesdavis	23 December 1981	list
(6283) 1980 VX_{1}	6 November 1980	list
(6430) 1964 UP	30 October 1964	list
7811 Zhaojiuzhang	23 February 1982	list
(7920) 1981 XM_{2}	3 December 1981	list
8126 Chanwainam	20 January 1966	list
8256 Shenzhou	25 October 1981	list
(8981) 1964 YJ	31 December 1964	list
8992 Magnanimity	14 October 1980	list
9512 Feijunlong	13 February 1966	list
9517 Niehaisheng	3 November 1977	list
(9710) 1964 VN_{1}	9 November 1964	list
10017 Jaotsungi	30 October 1978	list
(10687) 1980 XX	7 December 1980	list
(11439) 1974 XW	14 December 1974	list
(12181) 1964 VL_{1}	9 November 1964	list
(15677) 1980 TZ_{5}	14 October 1980	list
(16350) 1964 VZ_{2}	11 November 1964	list
23408 Beijingaoyun	12 October 1977	list

=== List of discoveries by the PMO NEO Survey Program ===
PMO NEO Survey discoveries: 646
see § PMO NEO Survey

Several hundred minor planets were discovered by the observatory's PMO NEO Survey Program from 2006 to 2013.

(168280) 2007 QR_{5}	18 August 2007	list
171448 Guchaohao	11 September 2007	list
175633 Yaoan	9 October 2007	list
185535 Gangda	28 November 2007	list
185538 Fangcheng	14 December 2007	list
185640 Sunyisui	1 March 2008	list
187707 Nandaxianlin	2 March 2008	list
187709 Fengduan	3 March 2008	list
188973 Siufaiwing	3 March 2008	list
192178 Lijieshou	10 March 2007	list
199947 Qaidam	16 April 2007	list
199953 Mingnaiben	18 April 2007	list
200002 Hehe	6 May 2007	list
200003 Aokeda	19 May 2007	list
202784 Gangkeda	29 February 2008	list
204836 Xiexiaosi	16 August 2007	list
204839 Suzhouyuanlin	16 August 2007	list
207681 Caiqiao	16 August 2007	list
207715 Muqinshuijiao	11 September 2007	list
207716 Wangxichan	11 September 2007	list
207723 Jiansanjiang	11 September 2007	list
(207755) 2007 SR_{6}	17 September 2007	list
207809 Wuzuze	9 October 2007	list
210210 Songjian	16 August 2007	list
210230 Linyuanpei	11 September 2007	list

210231 Wangdemin	11 September 2007	list
210232 Zhangjinqiu	11 September 2007	list
210292 Mayongsheng	6 October 2007	list
(212694) 2007 PT_{11}	12 August 2007	list
212795 Fangjiancheng	9 October 2007	list
212796 Guoyonghuai	9 October 2007	list
212797 Lipei	9 October 2007	list
(214880) 2007 RP_{157}	11 September 2007	list
214883 Yuanxikun	11 September 2007	list
(215021) 2009 BJ_{71}	26 January 2009	list
(215023) 2009 BR_{76}	27 January 2009	list
(216319) 2007 TY_{286}	10 October 2007	list
(216331) 2007 VG_{125}	5 November 2007	list
(216446) 2009 FA_{45}	25 March 2009	list
(218914) 2007 KG_{9}	19 May 2007	list
(227997) 2007 KU_{7}	16 May 2007	list
(228005) 2007 QR_{12}	16 August 2007	list
(228158) 2009 SZ_{96}	19 September 2009	list
(229743) 2007 JA_{5}	7 May 2007	list
229864 Sichouzhilu	14 October 2009	list
(231446) 2007 GE_{75}	10 April 2007	list
(233578) 2007 QK_{5}	16 August 2007	list
(236788) 2007 PM_{35}	9 August 2007	list
(236845) 2007 RZ_{118}	11 September 2007	list
(239308) 2007 QU_{5}	20 August 2007	list

(239348) 2007 RE_{147}	11 September 2007	list
(239350) 2007 RN_{157}	11 September 2007	list
(239402) 2007 TU_{41}	6 October 2007	list
(239417) 2007 TR_{92}	5 October 2007	list
(239676) 2008 YM_{32}	30 December 2008	list
(241138) 2007 QG_{14}	16 August 2007	list
(241197) 2007 SJ_{20}	21 September 2007	list
(241251) 2007 TQ_{234}	8 October 2007	list
(243048) 2006 YO_{50}	19 December 2006	list
(243115) 2007 RR_{157}	11 September 2007	list
(243182) 2007 TK_{178}	6 October 2007	list
(243242) 2007 VG_{207}	9 November 2007	list
(243413) 2009 BH_{111}	26 January 2009	list
(243485) 2009 TH_{26}	14 October 2009	list
(243488) 2009 TB_{41}	14 October 2009	list
(246162) 2007 QR	16 August 2007	list
(246228) 2007 RK_{232}	11 September 2007	list
(246229) 2007 RQ_{232}	11 September 2007	list
(246394) 2007 UL_{47}	17 October 2007	list
(246445) 2007 VK_{185}	6 November 2007	list
(246459) 2007 VV_{251}	11 November 2007	list
(246733) 2009 BJ_{62}	18 January 2009	list
(249017) 2007 RE_{119}	11 September 2007	list
(249092) 2007 VJ_{119}	4 November 2007	list
(249386) 2009 BU_{75}	24 January 2009	list

(249387) 2009 BN_{76}	26 January 2009	list
(249390) 2009 BJ_{96}	24 January 2009	list
(249398) 2009 BP_{150}	27 January 2009	list
(249465) 2009 HV_{102}	29 April 2009	list
(249528) 2010 GS_{29}	8 April 2010	list
(251492) 2008 ET_{36}	3 March 2008	list
(251504) 2008 EC_{146}	14 March 2008	list
(251543) 2009 BM_{62}	18 January 2009	list
(256574) 2007 TV_{79}	6 October 2007	list
(256578) 2007 TT_{183}	9 October 2007	list
(256817) 2008 CB_{121}	6 February 2008	list
(257441) 2010 QZ_{3}	19 August 2010	list
(263136) 2007 VH_{125}	5 November 2007	list
(263404) 2008 DT_{25}	29 February 2008	list
(263405) 2008 DE_{26}	29 February 2008	list
(263439) 2008 DW_{78}	28 February 2008	list
(263440) 2008 DF_{79}	29 February 2008	list
(263459) 2008 EL_{22}	2 March 2008	list
(263460) 2008 EM_{22}	2 March 2008	list
(263519) 2008 EC_{149}	2 March 2008	list
(263521) 2008 EQ_{149}	4 March 2008	list
(263904) 2009 FA_{37}	23 March 2009	list
(263961) 2009 JR_{1}	2 May 2009	list
(269436) 2009 SP_{174}	18 September 2009	list
(273879) 2007 HQ_{7}	16 April 2007	list

(274998) 2009 TA_{26}	14 October 2009	list
(275214) 2009 WY_{183}	23 November 2009	list
(275218) 2009 WV_{194}	24 November 2009	list
(278360) 2007 JU_{40}	12 May 2007	list
(278365) 2007 KR_{7}	16 May 2007	list
(278453) 2007 TY_{31}	5 October 2007	list
(278491) 2007 VQ_{148}	5 November 2007	list
(278517) 2008 DU_{25}	29 February 2008	list
(279137) 2009 RQ_{28}	13 September 2009	list
(281265) 2007 QR_{1}	16 August 2007	list
(281322) 2007 TU_{183}	9 October 2007	list
(281323) 2007 TX_{183}	9 October 2007	list
(281369) 2008 EQ_{25}	3 March 2008	list
(281756) 2009 BP_{68}	24 January 2009	list
(281766) 2009 FM_{74}	16 March 2009	list
(281813) 2009 WB_{195}	24 November 2009	list
(281870) 2010 EH_{66}	10 March 2010	list
(281880) 2010 GK_{126}	16 August 2007	list
(282979) 2007 TV_{41}	6 October 2007	list
(283022) 2007 VA_{234}	8 November 2007	list
(283151) 2009 AD_{8}	1 January 2009	list
(283225) 2010 QX_{2}	19 August 2010	list
(283279) 2011 HH_{38}	16 May 2007	list
(284481) 2007 JU_{3}	6 May 2007	list
(284485) 2007 JL_{44}	12 May 2007	list

(284531) 2007 RB_{148}	11 September 2007	list
(284532) 2007 RW_{157}	11 September 2007	list
(284576) 2007 TD_{92}	4 October 2007	list
(284611) 2007 UR_{5}	16 October 2007	list
(284652) 2007 XE_{28}	14 December 2007	list
(284838) 2009 BK_{68}	23 January 2009	list
(284969) 2010 FG_{85}	19 March 2010	list
(284971) 2010 GS_{6}	3 April 2010	list
(293541) 2007 HS_{7}	16 April 2007	list
(293583) 2007 JM_{2}	7 May 2007	list
(293604) 2007 JX_{43}	6 May 2007	list
(293654) 2007 PS_{11}	12 August 2007	list
(293692) 2007 PB_{36}	12 August 2007	list
(293713) 2007 QH_{14}	16 August 2007	list
(293715) 2007 QN_{16}	16 August 2007	list
(293779) 2007 RU_{119}	11 September 2007	list
(293787) 2007 RB_{134}	11 September 2007	list
(293800) 2007 RY_{147}	11 September 2007	list
(293801) 2007 RG_{148}	11 September 2007	list
(294333) 2007 VU_{73}	2 November 2007	list
(294362) 2007 VP_{102}	2 November 2007	list
(294385) 2007 VO_{148}	5 November 2007	list
(294599) 2008 AV_{2}	5 January 2008	list
(295097) 2008 EY_{159}	3 March 2008	list
(296040) 2009 AH_{2}	2 January 2009	list

(296079) 2009 BE_{11}	24 January 2009	list
(296126) 2009 BE_{71}	26 January 2009	list
(296131) 2009 BT_{75}	24 January 2009	list
(296132) 2009 BS_{76}	27 January 2009	list
(296143) 2009 BG_{96}	24 January 2009	list
(296157) 2009 BC_{115}	26 January 2009	list
(296168) 2009 BS_{131}	27 January 2009	list
(296199) 2009 BH_{187}	26 January 2009	list
(296341) 2009 FE_{1}	16 March 2009	list
(296349) 2009 FN_{9}	16 March 2009	list
(296492) 2009 JS_{1}	2 May 2009	list
(296585) 2009 RZ_{18}	13 September 2009	list
(296656) 2009 SD_{139}	18 September 2009	list
(296774) 2009 UG_{121}	24 October 2009	list
(296966) 2010 EG_{74}	10 March 2010	list
(297161) 2010 VU_{26}	29 February 2008	list
(300421) 2007 SD_{15}	21 September 2007	list
(300486) 2007 TK_{130}	6 October 2007	list
(300492) 2007 TE_{143}	9 October 2007	list
(300508) 2007 TV_{175}	4 October 2007	list
(300509) 2007 TG_{178}	6 October 2007	list
(300673) 2007 VZ_{11}	5 November 2007	list
(300723) 2007 VD_{125}	5 November 2007	list
(300728) 2007 VV_{137}	6 November 2007	list
(300867) 2008 AR_{4}	4 January 2008	list

(301260) 2009 BH_{71}	26 January 2009	list
(301316) 2009 BR_{150}	27 January 2009	list
(301341) 2009 BC_{188}	23 January 2009	list
(301527) 2009 FY_{35}	25 March 2009	list
(301542) 2009 FL_{62}	23 March 2009	list
(301707) 2010 GQ_{29}	8 April 2010	list
(304814) 2007 QQ_{5}	18 August 2007	list
(304873) 2007 RD_{148}	11 September 2007	list
(304901) 2007 RJ_{241}	11 September 2007	list
(305145) 2007 VS_{177}	6 November 2007	list
(305161) 2007 VA_{222}	6 November 2007	list
(305215) 2007 WP_{55}	28 November 2007	list
(305248) 2007 XP_{42}	14 December 2007	list
(305288) 2008 AT_{2}	5 January 2008	list
(305290) 2008 AT_{4}	5 January 2008	list
(305463) 2008 DN_{25}	29 February 2008	list
(305464) 2008 DB_{26}	29 February 2008	list
(305658) 2009 BD_{71}	26 January 2009	list
(305662) 2009 BM_{76}	26 January 2009	list
(305679) 2009 BP_{106}	26 January 2009	list
(305979) 2009 HJ_{100}	27 April 2009	list
(309199) 2007 EZ_{199}	10 March 2007	list
(309272) 2007 RW_{119}	11 September 2007	list
(309282) 2007 RM_{157}	11 September 2007	list
(309295) 2007 RX_{228}	16 August 2007	list

(309296) 2007 RP_{232}	11 September 2007	list
(309474) 2007 VO_{102}	2 November 2007	list
(309675) 2008 EV_{90}	3 March 2008	list
(309813) 2009 BL_{96}	24 January 2009	list
(310098) 2010 PE_{76}	10 August 2010	list
(311988) 2007 GP_{4}	10 April 2007	list
(312028) 2007 RA_{119}	11 September 2007	list
(312044) 2007 RS_{232}	11 September 2007	list
(312125) 2007 TT_{237}	9 October 2007	list
(312138) 2007 TD_{297}	10 October 2007	list
(312187) 2007 VG_{67}	2 November 2007	list
(312299) 2008 CH_{19}	4 February 2008	list
(312368) 2008 EF_{5}	2 March 2008	list
(312380) 2008 EB_{70}	4 March 2008	list
(312501) 2009 BU_{150}	27 January 2009	list
(312545) 2009 FO_{9}	16 March 2009	list
(312551) 2009 FL_{39}	25 March 2009	list
(312579) 2009 HY_{77}	27 April 2009	list
(312588) 2009 HZ_{99}	26 April 2009	list
(312713) 2010 QS_{3}	18 August 2010	list
(315198) 2007 PB_{49}	12 August 2007	list
(315240) 2007 RP_{284}	11 September 2007	list
(315396) 2007 VJ_{125}	5 November 2007	list
(315457) 2007 XC_{28}	14 December 2007	list
(315636) 2008 DF_{26}	29 February 2008	list

(316064) 2009 HB_{80}	27 April 2009	list
(316279) 2010 PZ_{57}	9 August 2010	list
(316450) 2010 UZ_{71}	29 February 2008	list
(316598) 2011 UW_{289}	29 February 2008	list
(317452) 2002 QT_{140}	7 August 2010	list
(320210) 2007 HL_{28}	18 April 2007	list
(320281) 2007 RR_{147}	11 September 2007	list
(320330) 2007 TQ_{92}	5 October 2007	list
(320332) 2007 TH_{116}	8 October 2007	list
(320348) 2007 TY_{183}	9 October 2007	list
(320723) 2008 DM_{83}	29 February 2008	list
(321244) 2009 BQ_{106}	27 January 2009	list
(321356) 2009 MF	15 June 2009	list
(324842) 2007 JG_{44}	12 May 2007	list
(324965) 2008 AQ_{4}	4 January 2008	list
(325083) 2008 DO_{25}	29 February 2008	list
(325136) 2008 ED_{149}	2 March 2008	list
(325495) 2009 RC_{19}	13 September 2009	list
(325582) 2009 SC_{139}	18 September 2009	list
(325812) 2010 RT_{115}	3 January 2008	list
(328163) 2008 CP_{179}	6 February 2008	list
(328554) 2009 RG_{63}	13 September 2009	list
(328722) 2009 TF_{26}	14 October 2009	list
(330640) 2008 FX_{2}	3 March 2008	list
(330913) 2009 SX_{92}	18 September 2009	list

(332376) 2007 EY_{200}	11 March 2007	list
(332428) 2007 TJ_{74}	10 October 2007	list
(332718) 2009 SV_{176}	19 September 2009	list
(335850) 2007 QO_{5}	17 August 2007	list
(335891) 2007 RE_{192}	11 September 2007	list
(335968) 2007 TW_{171}	21 September 2007	list
(335970) 2007 TW_{183}	9 October 2007	list
(336058) 2008 EU_{36}	3 March 2008	list
(336545) 2009 BF_{96}	24 January 2009	list
(336758) 2010 QQ_{5}	18 August 2010	list
(336877) 2011 GT_{41}	16 May 2007	list
(341162) 2007 PW_{48}	12 August 2007	list
(341726) 2007 VB_{222}	6 November 2007	list
(341758) 2007 VJ_{311}	5 November 2007	list
(342996) 2009 BN_{68}	23 January 2009	list
(342998) 2009 BF_{71}	26 January 2009	list
(343002) 2009 BL_{76}	26 January 2009	list
(343141) 2009 FB_{37}	23 March 2009	list
(343143) 2009 FP_{41}	23 March 2009	list
(343263) 2009 YU_{21}	28 December 2009	list
(343452) 2010 EF_{35}	10 March 2010	list
(343453) 2010 EH_{39}	10 March 2010	list
(343454) 2010 EN_{39}	10 March 2010	list
(343455) 2010 EO_{39}	10 March 2010	list
(343456) 2010 EP_{39}	10 March 2010	list

(343768) 2011 FD_{142}	13 May 2007	list
(345871) 2007 QR_{6}	13 August 2007	list
(345903) 2007 RD_{119}	11 September 2007	list
(345959) 2007 SA_{23}	21 September 2007	list
(345993) 2007 TO_{176}	5 October 2007	list
(346135) 2007 VF_{202}	5 November 2007	list
(346148) 2007 VH_{241}	11 November 2007	list
(346150) 2007 VE_{253}	5 November 2007	list
(346673) 2008 YO_{32}	30 December 2008	list
(346763) 2009 BZ_{73}	16 January 2009	list
(346767) 2009 BS_{74}	18 January 2009	list
(346800) 2009 BE_{175}	26 January 2009	list
(347046) 2010 EU_{123}	10 March 2010	list
(347083) 2010 GK_{75}	8 April 2010	list
(347336) 2012 NN_{1}	18 August 2007	list
(349187) 2007 RQ_{147}	11 September 2007	list
(349189) 2007 RQ_{157}	11 September 2007	list
(349242) 2007 TE_{92}	4 October 2007	list
(349262) 2007 TD_{184}	9 October 2007	list
(349357) 2007 VC_{170}	5 November 2007	list
(349366) 2007 VB_{227}	11 November 2007	list
(349422) 2008 AG_{29}	5 January 2008	list
(349790) 2009 BM_{68}	23 January 2009	list
(349795) 2009 BV_{76}	27 January 2009	list
(349805) 2009 BR_{106}	27 January 2009	list

(349810) 2009 BR_{131}	27 January 2009	list
(349970) 2010 EA_{35}	10 March 2010	list
(350013) 2010 HQ_{107}	23 April 2010	list
(352181) 2007 RL_{147}	11 September 2007	list
(352228) 2007 TF_{67}	3 October 2007	list
(352265) 2007 TJ_{247}	9 October 2007	list
(352517) 2008 CJ_{110}	9 February 2008	list
(352538) 2008 CN_{179}	6 February 2008	list
(352609) 2008 EA_{94}	3 March 2008	list
(352980) 2009 BP_{75}	23 January 2009	list
(352981) 2009 BQ_{76}	27 January 2009	list
(352986) 2009 BA_{99}	26 January 2009	list
(353012) 2009 BP_{161}	31 January 2009	list
(353161) 2009 HX_{84}	27 April 2009	list
(355313) 2007 RZ_{320}	11 September 2007	list
(355376) 2007 TW_{353}	9 October 2007	list
(355595) 2008 CO_{179}	6 February 2008	list
(355608) 2008 DX_{25}	29 February 2008	list
(355636) 2008 EM_{25}	3 March 2008	list
(355704) 2008 FW_{75}	3 March 2008	list
(356006) 2009 BR_{75}	24 January 2009	list
(356015) 2009 BF_{111}	26 January 2009	list
(356173) 2009 HQ_{74}	25 April 2009	list
(356691) 2011 UR_{124}	3 October 2011	list
(356786) 2011 UU_{306}	9 November 2007	list

(358618) 2007 VK_{119}	4 November 2007	list
(358793) 2008 EE_{25}	3 March 2008	list
(359143) 2009 BK_{96}	24 January 2009	list
(359144) 2009 BQ_{96}	24 January 2009	list
(359299) 2009 HA_{80}	27 April 2009	list
(361617) 2007 TD_{75}	3 October 2007	list
(361622) 2007 TB_{92}	4 October 2007	list
(361696) 2007 VM_{125}	5 November 2007	list
(361707) 2007 VU_{251}	10 November 2007	list
(361712) 2007 VX_{295}	5 November 2007	list
(361787) 2008 AZ_{112}	5 January 2008	list
(362079) 2009 BG_{111}	26 January 2009	list
(362082) 2009 BN_{125}	26 January 2009	list
(362183) 2009 FM_{62}	23 March 2009	list
(362421) 2010 PM_{75}	12 August 2010	list
(364569) 2007 QJ_{5}	16 August 2007	list
(364570) 2007 QL_{5}	16 August 2007	list
(364586) 2007 RG_{119}	11 September 2007	list
(364587) 2007 RJ_{119}	11 September 2007	list
(364619) 2007 SO_{21}	21 September 2007	list
(364693) 2007 UQ_{30}	4 October 2007	list
(364733) 2007 VS_{148}	5 November 2007	list
(364734) 2007 VT_{148}	5 November 2007	list
(364875) 2008 DP_{89}	29 February 2008	list
(364876) 2008 EJ_{4}	29 February 2008	list

(364879) 2008 EP_{25}	3 March 2008	list
(365087) 2009 BO_{106}	26 January 2009	list
(365219) 2009 HN_{49}	20 April 2009	list
(365226) 2009 HO_{91}	27 April 2009	list
(365235) 2009 JZ_{6}	20 April 2009	list
(365486) 2010 PV_{73}	9 August 2010	list
(365491) 2010 PD_{79}	10 August 2010	list
(365813) 2011 SP_{51}	18 January 2009	list
(365926) 2011 YQ_{35}	21 September 2007	list
(367509) 2009 LD_{7}	15 June 2009	list
(369313) 2009 SV_{92}	18 September 2009	list
(369422) 2009 WY_{194}	24 November 2009	list
(371818) 2007 TY_{349}	16 August 2007	list
(372329) 2009 BL_{75}	23 January 2009	list
(372349) 2009 FF_{46}	23 March 2009	list
(372551) 2009 TK_{36}	14 October 2009	list
(375008) 2007 GO_{9}	8 April 2007	list
(375144) 2008 AO_{134}	3 January 2008	list
(375646) 2008 YK_{128}	30 December 2008	list
(378411) 2007 RS_{119}	11 September 2007	list
(378431) 2007 RV_{232}	11 September 2007	list
(378481) 2007 TD_{148}	4 October 2007	list
(378605) 2008 EF_{149}	3 March 2008	list
(379948) 2012 MV_{12}	11 September 2007	list
(381146) 2007 FD_{33}	20 March 2007	list

(381147) 2007 GX_{1}	10 April 2007	list
(381323) 2007 VV_{252}	9 October 2007	list
(381729) 2009 RW_{18}	13 September 2009	list
(381730) 2009 RD_{19}	13 September 2009	list
(382185) 2012 KF_{18}	18 May 2007	list
(383672) 2007 TC_{183}	8 October 2007	list
(383744) 2007 VA_{84}	5 November 2007	list
(383769) 2007 VF_{242}	5 November 2007	list
(383782) 2007 VH_{323}	2 November 2007	list
(384182) 2009 BK_{75}	23 January 2009	list
(384556) 2010 FK_{13}	16 March 2010	list
(386080) 2007 JA_{44}	6 May 2007	list
(386104) 2007 RW_{59}	16 August 2007	list
(386113) 2007 RJ_{148}	11 September 2007	list
(386136) 2007 TH_{91}	8 October 2007	list
(386819) 2010 GR_{29}	8 April 2010	list
(388567) 2007 QX_{14}	24 August 2007	list
(388568) 2007 QW_{15}	16 August 2007	list
(389261) 2009 FN_{62}	23 March 2009	list
(389494) 2010 FJ_{6}	16 August 2007	list
(390420) 2013 YN_{32}	5 November 2007	list
(391996) 2008 YX_{84}	31 December 2008	list
(392039) 2009 BP_{76}	27 January 2009	list
(392044) 2009 BO_{96}	24 January 2009	list
(392123) 2009 FO_{40}	16 March 2009	list

(392333) 2010 ET_{105}	10 March 2010	list
(392368) 2010 GJ_{141}	8 April 2010	list
(392655) 2011 UL_{205}	25 March 2009	list
(394586) 2007 VF_{125}	5 November 2007	list
(394608) 2007 VK_{293}	6 November 2007	list
(394771) 2008 GG_{48}	2 March 2008	list
(394997) 2009 BG_{71}	26 January 2009	list
(395173) 2010 EZ_{34}	10 March 2010	list
(395251) 2010 ON_{96}	15 June 2009	list
(395459) 2011 SO_{274}	16 August 2007	list
(395486) 2011 UJ_{64}	18 October 2011	list
(395509) 2011 UL_{121}	13 August 2007	list
(395515) 2011 UN_{128}	16 August 2007	list
(396119) 2013 CH_{178}	8 February 2013	list
(397666) 2008 AS_{33}	5 January 2008	list
(397715) 2008 DW_{25}	29 February 2008	list
(398162) 2010 FU_{26}	19 March 2010	list
(398544) 2011 UB_{337}	13 August 2007	list
(399082) 2014 DZ_{13}	1 April 2009	list
(400266) 2007 RP_{147}	11 September 2007	list
(400634) 2009 DM_{132}	27 January 2009	list
(401145) 2011 UU_{404}	3 October 2011	list
(401776) 2014 DU_{66}	21 September 2007	list
(402891) 2007 SF_{3}	11 September 2007	list
(403924) 2012 AG_{13}	11 November 2007	list

(404838) 2014 JB_{78}	7 August 2010	list
(406308) 2007 HG_{60}	18 April 2007	list
(406407) 2007 TZ_{119}	9 October 2007	list
(406434) 2007 TQ_{245}	8 October 2007	list
(406533) 2007 VL_{315}	5 November 2007	list
(406662) 2008 EG_{22}	2 March 2008	list
(407330) 2010 PS_{63}	3 August 2010	list
(408244) 2013 EH_{117}	23 March 2009	list
(410195) 2007 RT_{147}	11 September 2007	list
(410505) 2008 EP_{82}	3 March 2008	list
(410528) 2008 FQ_{2}	3 March 2008	list
(410741) 2009 CQ_{53}	23 January 2009	list
(411030) 2009 UA_{117}	14 October 2009	list
(411646) 2011 UX_{321}	31 October 2011	list
(412106) 2013 GE_{8}	23 March 2009	list
(412687) 2014 OW_{234}	13 August 2007	list
(414033) 2007 QT_{5}	18 August 2007	list
(414064) 2007 SM_{19}	21 September 2007	list
(414066) 2007 SZ_{20}	21 September 2007	list
(414067) 2007 SB_{22}	21 September 2007	list
(414410) 2009 BJ_{111}	27 January 2009	list
(414413) 2009 BT_{150}	27 January 2009	list
(414529) 2009 SX_{96}	19 September 2009	list
(414780) 2010 PV_{77}	10 August 2010	list
(415059) 2012 BP_{22}	23 March 2009	list

(415064) 2012 BD_{51}	20 August 2010	list
(415478) 2014 OP_{194}	19 August 2010	list
(417856) 2007 JZ	6 May 2007	list
(417912) 2007 RX_{157}	11 September 2007	list
(417924) 2007 RG_{236}	16 August 2007	list
(417936) 2007 RT_{317}	11 September 2007	list
(417966) 2007 TX_{119}	9 October 2007	list
(417997) 2007 TC_{378}	21 September 2007	list
(418264) 2008 EW_{29}	4 March 2008	list
(419044) 2009 RT_{27}	13 September 2009	list
(419045) 2009 RP_{28}	13 September 2009	list
(419046) 2009 RN_{36}	25 August 2009	list
(419212) 2009 UY_{117}	14 October 2009	list
(419553) 2010 PA_{25}	7 August 2010	list
(419651) 2010 TJ_{58}	19 August 2010	list
(420612) 2012 HK_{60}	6 February 2008	list
(421369) 2013 TG_{130}	11 September 2007	list
(421388) 2013 UM_{11}	11 September 2007	list
(421396) 2013 VY_{5}	15 January 2009	list
(422400) 2014 SU_{279}	9 August 2010	list
(424271) 2007 TE_{36}	3 October 2007	list
(424280) 2007 TG_{116}	8 October 2007	list
(424512) 2008 EH_{22}	2 March 2008	list
(425066) 2009 RB_{19}	13 September 2009	list
(425480) 2010 FF_{5}	16 March 2010	list

(426215) 2012 KY_{46}	2 March 2008	list
(426723) 2013 TM_{51}	29 September 2013	list
(426822) 2013 UT_{6}	18 August 2007	list
(427115) 2014 UH_{94}	19 August 2010	list
(428339) 2007 JL_{2}	7 May 2007	list
(428373) 2007 RO_{212}	11 September 2007	list
(428399) 2007 SO_{23}	21 September 2007	list
(429519) 2011 BB_{52}	20 February 2007	list
(429919) 2012 TR_{185}	18 January 2009	list
(432991) 2012 PA_{33}	13 August 2007	list
(433026) 2012 SW_{4}	10 March 2010	list
(435180) 2007 RS_{10}	18 August 2007	list
(436122) 2009 TG_{26}	14 October 2009	list
(436646) 2011 QJ_{31}	24 August 2011	list
(436939) 2012 TS_{131}	18 August 2007	list
(437418) 2013 WV_{106}	12 November 2013	list
(438503) 2007 RX_{27}	16 August 2007	list
(438566) 2007 TN_{436}	11 September 2007	list
(438606) 2007 VJ_{242}	5 November 2007	list
(438614) 2007 VX_{328}	10 November 2007	list
(439562) 2014 DR_{72}	19 March 2010	list
(439626) 2014 FM_{19}	10 March 2010	list
(441034) 2007 FR_{20}	20 March 2007	list
(441104) 2007 SB_{11}	21 September 2007	list
(441229) 2007 VE_{125}	5 November 2007	list

(441374) 2008 EL_{43}	4 March 2008	list
(441737) 2009 BB_{99}	26 January 2009	list
(441778) 2009 DZ_{45}	26 January 2009	list
(442853) 2013 AE_{126}	18 January 2009	list
(442973) 2013 CZ_{137}	3 October 2011	list
(444927) 2008 AE_{117}	3 January 2008	list
(444960) 2008 DV_{25}	29 February 2008	list
(444969) 2008 EO_{25}	3 March 2008	list
(446081) 2013 CW_{172}	8 February 2013	list
(447780) 2007 RZ_{146}	11 September 2007	list
(447983) 2008 CG_{161}	9 February 2008	list
(448016) 2008 DG_{69}	29 February 2008	list
(448039) 2008 ER_{143}	3 March 2008	list
(448281) 2008 YH_{160}	31 December 2008	list
(448319) 2009 DV_{11}	24 January 2009	list
(448359) 2009 HZ_{21}	23 March 2009	list
(448768) 2011 SR_{33}	16 August 2007	list
(448807) 2011 TB_{17}	12 August 2007	list
(448988) 2012 AS_{14}	23 March 2009	list
(450766) 2007 RA_{134}	11 September 2007	list
(450768) 2007 RZ_{147}	11 September 2007	list
(450769) 2007 RS_{157}	11 September 2007	list
(451534) 2011 WO_{35}	22 November 2011	list
(453013) 2007 QN_{5}	17 August 2007	list
(453805) 2011 SJ_{39}	16 August 2007	list

(454335) 2014 KW_{90}	9 August 2010	list
(454400) 2014 NK_{31}	9 October 2007	list
456677 Yepeijian	11 September 2007	list
(456680) 2007 RK_{134}	11 September 2007	list
(456695) 2007 RT_{212}	18 August 2007	list
(456711) 2007 RG_{289}	11 September 2007	list
(456839) 2007 UP_{11}	8 October 2007	list
(456899) 2007 VV_{185}	5 November 2007	list
(458197) 2010 QK_{4}	18 August 2010	list
(458598) 2011 FL_{42}	9 March 2011	list
(462105) 2007 QS_{5}	18 August 2007	list
(462207) 2007 VX_{138}	9 October 2007	list
(462215) 2007 VS_{252}	9 October 2007	list
(462873) 2010 VR_{96}	8 November 2010	list
(463407) 2013 HX_{36}	10 August 2010	list
(464257) 2015 EY_{11}	12 August 2007	list
(465213) 2007 RS_{15}	11 September 2007	list
(465296) 2007 TE_{359}	21 September 2007	list
(466266) 2013 LM_{4}	21 September 2007	list
(466550) 2014 SX_{307}	12 August 2007	list
(466648) 2014 WK_{55}	13 August 2007	list
(466827) 2015 BH_{194}	16 August 2007	list
(467600) 2007 VA_{253}	5 November 2007	list
(467759) 2009 UJ_{135}	25 October 2009	list
(467888) 2011 FD_{26}	29 March 2011	list

(468681) 2009 MZ_{6}	25 June 2009	list
(470341) 2007 RB_{119}	11 September 2007	list
(470425) 2007 VX_{240}	21 September 2007	list
(471844) 2012 XX_{116}	31 December 2008	list
(472039) 2013 YO_{34}	26 December 2013	list
(472237) 2014 HE_{43}	25 October 2011	list
(473715) 2015 YR_{18}	25 October 2011	list
(473869) 2016 EU_{135}	11 September 2007	list
(475932) 2007 ET_{87}	11 March 2007	list
(475987) 2007 PC_{36}	12 August 2007	list
(476015) 2007 RD_{134}	11 September 2007	list
(476017) 2007 RO_{157}	11 September 2007	list
(476030) 2007 RW_{232}	11 September 2007	list
(476416) 2008 DC_{26}	29 February 2008	list
(476987) 2008 YF_{81}	30 December 2008	list
(477138) 2009 DE_{15}	23 January 2009	list
(477939) 2011 QH_{83}	27 January 2009	list
(479004) 2012 XX_{143}	15 January 2009	list
(479101) 2013 AN_{142}	3 October 2011	list
(479167) 2013 CT_{29}	25 October 2011	list
(479169) 2013 CS_{31}	3 March 2008	list
(479890) 2014 HK_{22}	3 March 2008	list
(480296) 2015 HS_{154}	20 April 2009	list
(481555) 2007 RE_{233}	11 September 2007	list
(481556) 2007 RH_{239}	11 September 2007	list

(482078) 2010 EY_{42}	12 March 2010	list
(482313) 2011 UF_{201}	25 October 2011	list
(482970) 2014 KM_{82}	13 September 2009	list
(484518) 2008 EW_{90}	3 March 2008	list
(484913) 2009 SM_{19}	18 September 2009	list
(485614) 2011 UZ_{321}	31 October 2011	list
(488340) 2016 VH_{16}	19 December 2011	list
(489599) 2007 TN_{165}	10 October 2007	list
(489632) 2007 TE_{367}	9 October 2007	list
(489700) 2007 VK_{125}	5 November 2007	list
(489833) 2008 ED_{92}	6 February 2008	list
(489838) 2008 EJ_{143}	3 March 2008	list
(491204) 2011 UN_{120}	13 August 2007	list
(492210) 2013 SP_{27}	16 August 2007	list
(492491) 2014 NJ_{56}	16 August 2007	list
(493739) 2015 TV_{201}	8 September 2015	list
(494371) 2016 UC_{27}	1 January 2009	list
(494821) 2007 TN_{80}	21 September 2007	list
(494850) 2008 CZ_{77}	6 February 2008	list
(495212) 2013 CX_{185}	19 May 2010	list
(496069) 2009 RT_{18}	13 September 2009	list
(498067) 2007 RC_{134}	11 September 2007	list
(498394) 2007 XV_{29}	9 November 2007	list
(498456) 2008 BK_{41}	5 January 2008	list
(498471) 2008 CA_{51}	6 February 2008	list

(499100) 2009 FV_{70}	23 March 2009	list
(499117) 2009 HZ_{93}	27 April 2009	list
(499145) 2009 RF_{19}	13 September 2009	list
(499213) 2009 UC_{40}	14 October 2009	list
(499862) 2011 EU_{76}	7 March 2011	list
(501236) 2013 VY_{6}	12 October 2013	list
(501252) 2013 VX_{21}	8 October 2013	list
(501265) 2013 WE_{12}	26 November 2013	list
(501384) 2013 YC_{66}	4 December 2013	list
(501534) 2014 FQ_{55}	11 March 2008	list
(501856) 2014 WY_{223}	29 February 2008	list
(502686) 2015 CE_{61}	25 November 2013	list
(503197) 2015 HA_{11}	1 September 2013	list
(504449) 2008 CK_{110}	9 February 2008	list
(504477) 2008 EK_{87}	3 March 2008	list
(504742) 2009 VC_{107}	27 October 2009	list
(505486) 2013 WG_{3}	4 November 2013	list
(505873) 2015 DC_{99}	3 March 2008	list
(505906) 2015 DV_{223}	30 March 2011	list
(506114) 2016 AH_{196}	29 February 2008	list
(506393) 2017 RU_{13}	24 August 2011	list
(507100) 2009 HM_{44}	20 April 2009	list
(507471) 2012 TO_{240}	31 December 2008	list
(508397) 2016 GL_{187}	19 August 2010	list
(509506) 2007 VY_{11}	5 November 2007	list

(509514) 2007 VG_{202}	5 November 2007	list
(509610) 2008 EA_{136}	29 February 2008	list
(509914) 2009 FH_{41}	16 March 2009	list
(510058) 2010 GW_{65}	4 April 2010	list
(511238) 2014 BK_{17}	27 November 2013	list
(512223) 2015 TP_{302}	11 September 2007	list
(512282) 2016 GC_{124}	21 March 2015	list
(513340) 2007 PC_{49}	13 August 2007	list
(513491) 2009 FM	27 January 2009	list
(513557) 2010 PE_{74}	10 August 2010	list
(513929) 2014 DU_{4}	8 April 2010	list
(515164) 2011 QO_{38}	21 September 2007	list
(516613) 2007 TT_{97}	17 September 2007	list
(516745) 2009 RA_{19}	13 September 2009	list
(516746) 2009 RE_{19}	13 September 2009	list
(517938) 2015 TM_{259}	7 September 2015	list
(519197) 2010 PF_{74}	10 August 2010	list
(519419) 2011 UU_{270}	25 October 2011	list
(520044) 2013 VL_{29}	11 September 2007	list
(520174) 2014 CN_{27}	11 September 2007	list
(523246) 2017 AM_{10}	20 October 2015	list

== Image gallery ==
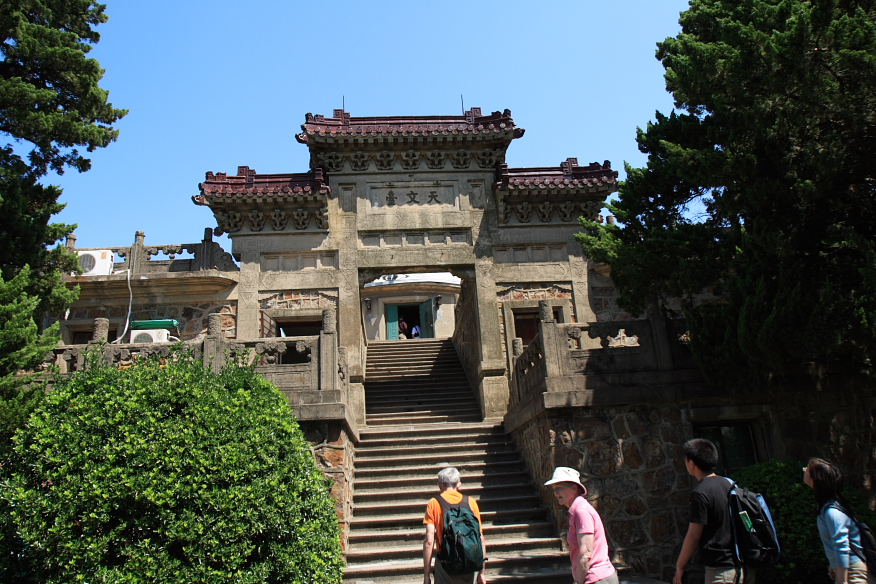
Gate of the Purple Mountain Observatory

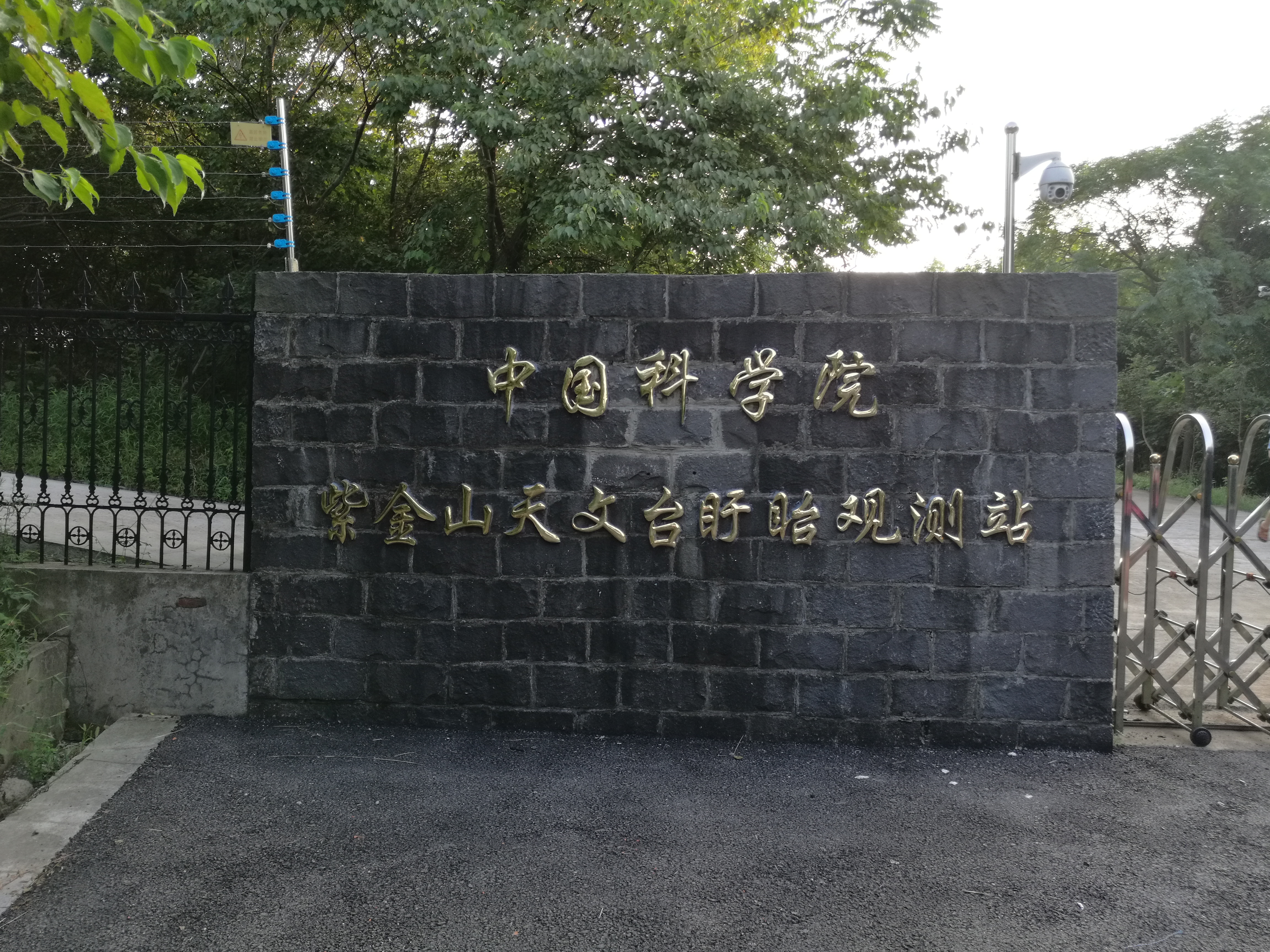
Entrance at the Xuyi Station

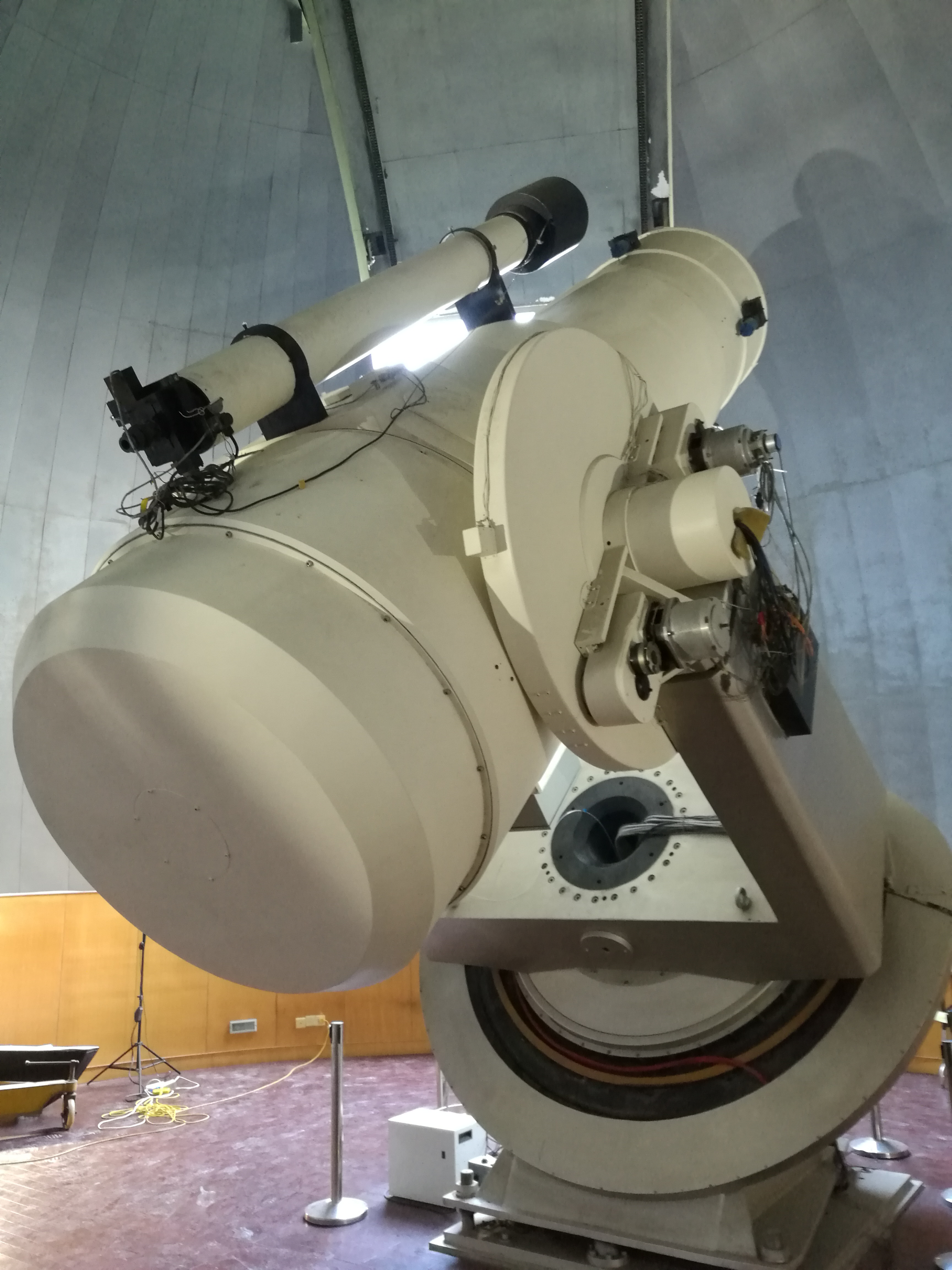
Telescope at Xuyi Station

== See also ==
- List of astronomical observatories
- Liu Caipin
- Wang Sichao
