= 8116 Jeanperrin =

Main-belt asteroid binary

Discovery
- Discovered by: E. W. Elst
- Discovery site: La Silla Obs.
- Discovery date: 17 April 1996

Designations
- Named after: Jean Baptiste Perrin (French physicist)
- Alternative designations: 1996 HA_{15} · 1987 WU_{3} 1990 RS_{11}
- Minor planet category: main-belt · (inner); Flora

Orbital characteristics
- Epoch 23 March 2018 (JD 2458200.5)
- Uncertainty parameter 0
- Observation arc: 30.26 yr (11,051 d)
- Aphelion: 2.6079 AU
- Perihelion: 1.8916 AU
- Semi-major axis: 2.2498 AU
- Eccentricity: 0.1592
- Orbital period (sidereal): 3.37 yr (1,233 d)
- Mean anomaly: 36.814°
- Mean motion: 0° 17^{m} 31.56^{s} / day
- Inclination: 5.4335°
- Longitude of ascending node: 48.972°
- Argument of perihelion: 320.86°
- Known satellites: 1 (D: 1.49 km; P: 36.15 h)

Physical characteristics
- Mean diameter: 3.66±0.10 km 3.72±0.63 km 4.773±0.075 km 4.797 km 4.80 km (taken)
- Synodic rotation period: 3.6169±0.0002 h 3.6169±0.0002 h (Note: Pravec (Feb 2012) web: rotation period 3.6169±0.0002 hours with a brightness amplitude of 0.10±0.01 mag. Quality code of 3. Summary figures for (8116) Jeanperrin at the LCDB and Pravec, P.; Wolf, M.; Sarounova, L. (2012) (Ondrejov data).); 3.61692±0.00007 h (Note: Pravec (Oct 2007) web: observations in the R-band. Rotation period of 3.61692±0.00007 hours with a brightness amplitude of 0.09±0.01 mag. Quality code of 3. Summary figures for (8116) Jeanperrin at the LCDB and Pravec, P.; Wolf, M.; Sarounova, L. (2007) (Ondrejov data).)
- Geometric albedo: 0.1841; 0.1859±0.0353; 0.186±0.035; 0.40±0.19; 0.437±0.045
- Spectral type: S (assumed); V–R = 0.475±0.020; V–I = 0.870±0.030
- Absolute magnitude (H): 13.52±0.13; 13.64±0.04 (R); 13.70; 13.8; 13.98±0.35; 14.05

8116 Jeanperrin, provisional designation 1996 HA_{15}, is a Florian asteroid and synchronous binary system from the inner regions of the asteroid belt, approximately 4.8 kilometers (3 miles) in diameter. It was discovered on 17 April 1996, by Belgian astronomer Eric Elst at the La Silla Observatory in northern Chile. The likely stony S-type asteroid has a rotation period of 3.62 hours and a nearly round shape. It was named for French physicist and Nobel laureate Jean Baptiste Perrin. A minor-planet moon, a third the size of its primary, was discovered in 2007.

== Orbit and classification ==
Jeanperrin is a member of the Flora family (402), a giant asteroid family and the largest family of stony asteroids in the main-belt.

It orbits the Sun in the inner asteroid belt at a distance of 1.9–2.6 AU once every 3 years and 4 months (1,233 days; semi-major axis of 2.25 AU). Its orbit has an eccentricity of 0.16 and an inclination of 5° with respect to the ecliptic. The body's observation arc begins with its first observations as 1987 WU_{3} at Anderson Mesa Station in November 1987, more than 8 years prior to its official discovery observation at La Silla.

== Physical characteristics ==
Jeanperrin is an assumed S-type asteroid, which agrees with the overall spectral type for member of the Flora family.

=== Rotation period ===
In October 2007, a rotational lightcurve of Jeanperrin was obtained from photometric observations by a large international collaboration of astronomers. Lightcurve analysis gave a rotation period of 3.6169 hours and a low brightness variation of 0.09 magnitude, indicative of a nearly spheroidal shape (U=3). Additional observations by Petr Pravec at Ondřejov Observatory in 2007 and 2017, rendered a nearly identical period of 3.6169 and 3.61692 hours with an amplitude of 0.09 and 0.10 magnitude, respectively (U=3/3).

=== Diameter and albedo ===
According to the survey carried out by the NEOWISE mission of NASA's Wide-field Infrared Survey Explorer, Jeanperrin measures between 3.66 and 4.797 kilometers in diameter and its surface has an albedo between 0.1841 and 0.437.

The Collaborative Asteroid Lightcurve Link adopts Petr Pravec's revised WISE data, that is, an albedo of 0.1841 and a (rounded) diameter of 4.80 kilometers based on an absolute magnitude of 14.05.

=== Satellite ===
During the photometric observations in October 2007 (see above), it was also revealed, that Jeanperrin is a synchronous binary asteroid with a minor-planet moon in its orbit. The satellite measures approximately 1.49 kilometers in diameter (d_{s}/d_{p}-ratio of at least 0.33), and orbits its primary at an estimated average distance of 13 kilometers once every 36.15 hours (1.506 days).

== Naming ==
This minor planet was named after French physicist Jean Baptiste Perrin (1870–1942), who was awarded the 1926 Nobel Prize in Physics for his studies of Brownian motion (also see list of laureates). The official naming citation was published by the Minor Planet Center on 11 February 1998 (M.P.C. 31299).
