= 8992 Magnanimity =

Main-belt asteroid

Discovery
- Discovered by: Purple Mountain Obs.
- Discovery site: Nanjing, China
- Discovery date: 14 October 1980

Designations
- Named after: Magnanimity (in memory of 9/11)
- Alternative designations: 1980 TE_{7} · 1954 RE; 1980 TJ_{11} · 1991 TV
- Minor planet category: main-belt · (inner)

Orbital characteristics
- Epoch 4 September 2017 (JD 2458000.5)
- Uncertainty parameter 0
- Observation arc: 61.89 yr (22,606 days)
- Aphelion: 2.8916 AU
- Perihelion: 1.8886 AU
- Semi-major axis: 2.3901 AU
- Eccentricity: 0.2098
- Orbital period (sidereal): 3.70 yr (1,350 days)
- Mean anomaly: 39.560°
- Mean motion: 0° 16^{m} 0.12^{s} / day
- Inclination: 7.9283°
- Longitude of ascending node: 188.65°
- Argument of perihelion: 133.59°

Physical characteristics
- Dimensions: 6.21 km (calculated)
- Synodic rotation period: 20.719±0.001 h (Note: Pravec (2013): lightcurve plot of (8992) Magnanimity with a rotation period 20.719±0.001 hours with a brightness amplitude of 0.25 mag. Summary figures at Collaborative Asteroid Lightcurve Link (CALL) and Pravec, P.; Wolf, M.; Sarounova, L. (2013))
- Geometric albedo: 0.20 (assumed)
- Spectral type: S
- Absolute magnitude (H): 13.4 · 13.70±0.72

8992 Magnanimity, provisional designation 1980 TE_{7}, is a stony asteroid from the inner regions of the asteroid belt, approximately 6 kilometers in diameter.

The asteroid was discovered on 14 October 1980, by a team of astronomers at the Purple Mountain Observatory in Nanjing, China. It was named in response to the September 11 attacks.

== Orbit and classification ==
Magnanimity orbits the Sun in the inner main-belt at a distance of 1.9–2.9 AU once every 3 years and 8 months (1,350 days). Its orbit has an eccentricity of 0.21 and an inclination of 8° with respect to the ecliptic. In September 1954, it was first identified as 1954 RE at Goethe Link Observatory, extending the body's observation arc by 26 years prior to its official discovery observation at Nanjing.

== Physical characteristics ==
The Collaborative Asteroid Lightcurve Link assumes a standard albedo for stony asteroids of 0.20 and calculates a diameter of 6.2 kilometers. A rotational lightcurve of Magnanimity was obtained from photometric observations by Czech astronomer Petr Pravec at Ondřejov Observatory in September 2013. It gave a well-defined and longer-than-average rotation period of 20.719 hours with a brightness variation of 0.25 magnitude (U=3).

== Naming ==
This minor planet was named Magnanimity in response to the September 11 attacks. As a commemorative gesture, the IAU's Committee for the Nomenclature of Small Bodies chose three objects discovered from observatories on different continents and christened them with names representing some of the most basic and universal human values. The other two selections were 8990 Compassion (discovered from Europe) and 8991 Solidarity (discovered from South America). The approved naming citation was published by the Minor Planet Center on 2 October 2001 (M.P.C. 43684).
