= 8776 Campestris =

Stony background asteroid

Discovery
- Discovered by: C. J. van Houten; I. van Houten; T. Gehrels
- Discovery site: Palomar Obs.
- Discovery date: 16 October 1977

Designations
- Pronunciation: /kæmˈpɛstrɪs/
- Named after: Anthus campestris (the tawny pipit)
- Alternative designations: 2287 T-3 · 1990 SO_{10}
- Minor planet category: main-belt · (middle) background

Orbital characteristics
- Epoch 4 September 2017 (JD 2458000.5)
- Uncertainty parameter 0
- Observation arc: 38.98 yr (14,236 days)
- Aphelion: 3.2415 AU
- Perihelion: 2.1392 AU
- Semi-major axis: 2.6904 AU
- Eccentricity: 0.2049
- Orbital period (sidereal): 4.41 yr (1,612 days)
- Mean anomaly: 94.226°
- Inclination: 3.4400°
- Longitude of ascending node: 300.27°
- Argument of perihelion: 338.93°

Physical characteristics
- Dimensions: 7.65 km (calculated); 10.543±0.106 km
- Synodic rotation period: 9.2982±0.0118 h 9.2990±0.0064 h
- Geometric albedo: 0.058±0.008; 0.10 (assumed)
- Spectral type: S
- Absolute magnitude (H): 13.7 · 13.6 · 14.122±0.002 (S) · 13.734±0.002 (R)

8776 Campestris, provisional designation 2287 T-3, is a stony background asteroid from the central region of the asteroid belt, approximately 10 kilometers in diameter. It was discovered on 16 October 1977, by Dutch astronomer couple Ingrid and Cornelis van Houten at Leiden Observatory, and Dutch–American astronomer Tom Gehrels at the Palomar Observatory in California, United States. The asteroid was named for the tawny pipit (Anthus campestris), a shorebird.

== Orbit and classification ==
Campestris is a non-family asteroid from the main belt's background population. It orbits the Sun in the central main-belt at a distance of 2.1–3.2 AU once every 4 years and 5 months (1,612 days). Its orbit has an eccentricity of 0.20 and an inclination of 3° with respect to the ecliptic.

=== Survey designation ===
The survey designation "T-3" stands for the third Palomar–Leiden Trojan survey, named after the fruitful collaboration of the Palomar and Leiden Observatory in the 1960s and 1970s. Gehrels used Palomar's Samuel Oschin telescope (also known as the 48-inch Schmidt Telescope), and shipped the photographic plates to Cornelis and Ingrid van Houten-Groeneveld at Leiden Observatory where astrometry was carried out. The trio of astronomers are credited with the discovery of several thousand minor planets.

== Naming ==
This minor planet is named for the passerine bird Anthus campestris, or tawny pipit. It is on the Dutch Red List of birds endangered in the Netherlands. It is also on the European Red List of Birds as of 2015. The official naming citation was published by the Minor Planet Center on 2 February 1999 (M.P.C. 33793).

== Physical characteristics ==
=== Rotation period ===
In 2012, two rotational lightcurves of Campestris were obtained from photometric observations taken at the Palomar Transient Factory in California. Lightcurve analysis gave a rotation period of 9.2982 and 9.2990 hours with a brightness variation of 0.35 and 0.38 magnitude, respectively (U=2/2).

=== Diameter and albedo ===
According to the survey carried out by the NEOWISE mission of NASA's Wide-field Infrared Survey Explorer, Campestris measures 10.5 kilometers in diameter and its surface has an albedo of 0.058. The Collaborative Asteroid Lightcurve Link assumes a higher albedo of 0.10 and calculates a diameter of 7.5 kilometers.
