= 8991 Solidarity =

Carbonaceous asteroid

Discovery
- Discovered by: ESO
- Discovery site: La Silla Obs.
- Discovery date: 6 August 1980

Designations
- Named after: Solidarity (in memory of 9/11)
- Alternative designations: 1980 PV_{1} · 1975 QB; 1979 HC_{1} · 1985 SD_{3} 1988 FR_{3} · 1988 GW_{2}
- Minor planet category: main-belt · (middle)

Orbital characteristics
- Epoch 4 September 2017 (JD 2458000.5)
- Uncertainty parameter 0
- Observation arc: 41.57 yr (15,183 days)
- Aphelion: 3.2956 AU
- Perihelion: 2.2799 AU
- Semi-major axis: 2.7877 AU
- Eccentricity: 0.1822
- Orbital period (sidereal): 4.65 yr (1,700 days)
- Mean anomaly: 70.461°
- Mean motion: 0° 12^{m} 42.48^{s} / day
- Inclination: 6.7882°
- Longitude of ascending node: 286.51°
- Argument of perihelion: 312.52°

Physical characteristics
- Dimensions: 8.385±0.342 km 12.88 km (calculated)
- Synodic rotation period: 5.2388±0.0034 h
- Geometric albedo: 0.057 (assumed); 0.174±0.022
- Spectral type: C
- Absolute magnitude (H): 12.37±1.03 · 12.729±0.003 (R) · 12.8 · 12.9 · 13.18

8991 Solidarity, provisional designation 1980 PV_{1}, is a carbonaceous asteroid from the middle region of the asteroid belt, approximately 10 kilometers in diameter. It was discovered on 6 August 1980, by observers at ESO's La Silla Observatory site in northern Chile. The asteroid was named in response to the September 11 attacks.

== Orbit and classification ==
Solidarity orbits the Sun in the central main-belt at a distance of 2.3–3.3 AU once every 4 years and 8 months (1,700 days). Its orbit has an eccentricity of 0.18 and an inclination of 7° with respect to the ecliptic. The first used observation was made at Cerro El Roble Observatory in 1979, extending the body's observation arc by 1 year prior to its official discovery observation at La Silla.

== Physical characteristics ==
=== Rotation period ===
In January 2011, a rotational lightcurve of Solidarity was obtained from photometric observations at the Palomar Transient Factory in California. It gave a rotation period of 5.2388 hours with a brightness variation of 0.19 magnitude (U=2).

=== Diameter and albedo ===
According to the survey carried out by the NEOWISE mission of NASA's Wide-field Infrared Survey Explorer, Solidarity measures 8.4 kilometers in diameter and its surface has an albedo of 0.17, while the Collaborative Asteroid Lightcurve Link assumes a standard albedo for carbonaceous asteroids of 0.057 and calculates a diameter of 12.9 kilometers with an absolute magnitude of 13.18.

== Naming ==
This minor planet was named "Solidarity" in response to the September 11 attacks. As a commemorative gesture, the IAU's Committee for the Nomenclature of Small Bodies chose three objects discovered in observatories on different continents and christened them with names representing some of the most basic and universal human values. The other two selections were 8990 Compassion (discovered from Europe) and 8992 Magnanimity (discovered from Asia). The official naming citation was published by the Minor Planet Center on 2 October 2001 (M.P.C. 43684).
