= 8441 Lapponica =

Asteroid

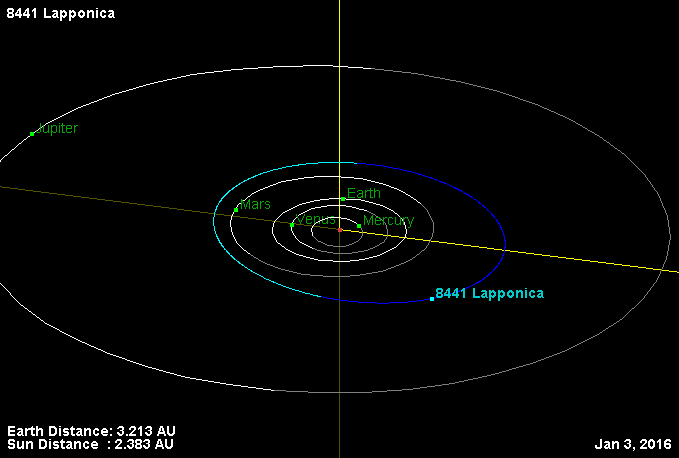
- Orbit of 8441 Lapponica.

Discovery
- Discovered by: C. J. van Houten; I. van Houten-G. T. Gehrels
- Discovery site: Palomar Obs.
- Discovery date: 16 October 1977

Designations
- Pronunciation: /ləˈpɒnɪkə/
- Named after: Bar-tailed godwit (A shorebird)
- Alternative designations: 4008 T-3 · 1953 EC_{1} 1989 LP
- Minor planet category: main-belt · (inner) background · Flora

Orbital characteristics
- Epoch 23 March 2018 (JD 2458200.5)
- Uncertainty parameter 0
- Observation arc: 65.13 yr (23,788 d)
- Aphelion: 2.4945 AU
- Perihelion: 1.8857 AU
- Semi-major axis: 2.1901 AU
- Eccentricity: 0.1390
- Orbital period (sidereal): 3.24 yr (1,184 d)
- Mean anomaly: 9.5854°
- Mean motion: 0° 18^{m} 14.76^{s} / day
- Inclination: 4.9910°
- Longitude of ascending node: 97.923°
- Argument of perihelion: 86.900°

Physical characteristics
- Mean diameter: 4.50 km (calculated)
- Synodic rotation period: 3.27±0.01 h 3.275±0.001 h
- Geometric albedo: 0.24 (assumed)
- Spectral type: L (Pan-STARRS); L (SDSS-MOC); S (assumed)
- Absolute magnitude (H): 13.9; 13.99±0.23

8441 Lapponica, provisional designation 4008 T-3, is a background asteroid from the Florian region of the inner asteroid belt, approximately 4.5 kilometers (3 miles) in diameter. It was discovered on 16 October 1977, by Ingrid and Cornelis van Houten at Leiden, and Tom Gehrels at Palomar Observatory in California. The L-type asteroid has a rotation period of 3.27 hours. It was named for the Bar-tailed godwit, a shorebird also known by its Latin name Limosa lapponica.

== Orbit and classification ==
Lapponica is a non-family asteroid of the main belt's background population when applying the hierarchical clustering method to its proper orbital elements. Based on osculating Keplerian orbital elements, the asteroid has also been classified as a member of the Flora family (402), a giant asteroid family and the largest family of stony asteroids in the main-belt.

The asteroid orbits the Sun in the inner main-belt at a distance of 1.9–2.5 AU once every 3 years and 3 months (1,184 days; semi-major axis of 2.19 AU). Its orbit has an eccentricity of 0.14 and an inclination of 5° with respect to the ecliptic. The body's observation arc begins with its first observation as 1953 EC_{1} at Goethe Link Observatory in March 1953, more than 24 years prior to its official discovery observation.

=== Palomar–Leiden Trojan survey ===
The survey designation "T-3" stands for the third Palomar–Leiden Trojan survey, named after the fruitful collaboration of the Palomar and Leiden Observatory in the 1960s and 1970s. Gehrels used Palomar's Samuel Oschin telescope (also known as the 48-inch Schmidt Telescope), and shipped the photographic plates to Ingrid and Cornelis van Houten at Leiden Observatory where astrometry was carried out. The trio are credited with the discovery of several thousand asteroid discoveries.

== Physical characteristics ==
Lapponica has been characterized as an L-type asteroid in the SDSS-based taxonomy and by Pan-STARRS' survey. It is also an assumed S-type asteroid.

=== Rotation period ===
In 2008, two rotational lightcurves of Lapponica were obtained from photometric observations by French amateur astronomer Pierre Antonini and by Maurice Clark at the Montgomery College Observatory in Maryland. Analysis of the best-rated lightcurve gave a rotation period of 3.27 hours with a consolidated brightness amplitude between 0.29 and 0.50 magnitude (U=3-/2+).

=== Diameter and albedo ===
The Collaborative Asteroid Lightcurve Link assumes an albedo of 0.24 – derived from 8 Flora, the parent body of the Flora family – and calculates a diameter of 4.50 kilometers based on an absolute magnitude of 13.9.

== Naming ==
This minor planet was named for the bar-tailed godwit (Limosa lapponica) a migratory bird of the family Scolopacidae. The official naming citation was published by the Minor Planet Center on 2 February 1999 (M.P.C. 33791) and revised on 2 April 1999 (M.P.C. 34089).
