= List of minor planets: 2001–3000 =

The following is a partial list of minor planets, running from minor-planet number 2001 through 3000, inclusive. The primary data for this and other partial lists is based on JPL's "Small-Body Orbital Elements" and data available from the Minor Planet Center. Critical list information is also provided by the MPC, unless otherwise specified from Lowell Observatory. A detailed description of the table's columns and additional sources are given on the main page including a complete list of every page in this series, and a statistical break-up on the dynamical classification of minor planets.

Also see the summary list of all named bodies in numerical and alphabetical order, and the corresponding naming citations for the number range of this particular list. New namings may only be added to this list after official publication, as the preannouncement of names is condemned by the Working Group for Small Bodies Nomenclature of the International Astronomical Union.

Near-Earth obj.	MBA (inner)	MBA (outer)	Centaur
Mars-crosser	MBA (middle)	Jupiter trojan	Trans-Neptunian obj.
Unclassified

== 2001–2100 ==
Designation			Discovery			Properties		Ref
Permanent	Provisional	Named after	Date	Site	Discoverer(s)	Category	Diam.	Ref
2001 Einstein	1973 EB	Einstein	March 5, 1973	Zimmerwald	P. Wild	H	4.0 km (2.5 mi)	MPC · JPL
2002 Euler	1973 QQ_{1}	Euler	August 29, 1973	Nauchnij	T. M. Smirnova	·	20 km (12 mi)	MPC · JPL
2003 Harding	6559 P-L	Harding	September 24, 1960	Palomar	C. J. van Houten, I. van Houten-Groeneveld, T. Gehrels	·	20 km (12 mi)	MPC · JPL
2004 Lexell	1973 SV_{2}	Lexell	September 22, 1973	Nauchnij	N. S. Chernykh	·	7.3 km (4.5 mi)	MPC · JPL
2005 Hencke	1973 RA	Hencke	September 2, 1973	Zimmerwald	P. Wild	EUN	9.4 km (5.8 mi)	MPC · JPL
2006 Polonskaya	1973 SB_{3}	Polonskaya	September 22, 1973	Nauchnij	N. S. Chernykh	moon	4.6 km (2.9 mi)	MPC · JPL
2007 McCuskey	1963 SQ	McCuskey	September 22, 1963	Brooklyn	Indiana University	NYS ·	26 km (16 mi)	MPC · JPL
2008 Konstitutsiya	1973 SV_{4}	Konstitutsiya	September 27, 1973	Nauchnij	L. I. Chernykh	·	52 km (32 mi)	MPC · JPL
2009 Voloshina	1968 UL	Voloshina	October 22, 1968	Nauchnij	T. M. Smirnova	THM ·	27 km (17 mi)	MPC · JPL
2010 Chebyshev	1969 TL_{4}	Chebyshev	October 13, 1969	Nauchnij	B. A. Burnasheva	THM	25 km (16 mi)	MPC · JPL
2011 Veteraniya	1970 QB_{1}	Veteraniya	August 30, 1970	Nauchnij	T. M. Smirnova	V	5.2 km (3.2 mi)	MPC · JPL
2012 Guo Shou-Jing	1964 TE_{2}	Guo Shou-Jing	October 9, 1964	Nanking	Purple Mountain	slow	12 km (7.5 mi)	MPC · JPL
2013 Tucapel	1971 UH_{4}	Tucapel	October 22, 1971	Cerro El Roble	University of Chile	·	11 km (6.8 mi)	MPC · JPL
2014 Vasilevskis	1973 JA	Vasilevskis	May 2, 1973	Mount Hamilton	A. R. Klemola	·	9.0 km (5.6 mi)	MPC · JPL
2015 Kachuevskaya	1972 RA_{3}	Kachuevskaya	September 4, 1972	Nauchnij	L. V. Zhuravleva	·	12 km (7.5 mi)	MPC · JPL
2016 Heinemann	1938 SE	Heinemann	September 18, 1938	Heidelberg	A. Bohrmann	THM	22 km (14 mi)	MPC · JPL
2017 Wesson	A903 SC	Wesson	September 20, 1903	Heidelberg	M. F. Wolf	·	7.2 km (4.5 mi)	MPC · JPL
2018 Schuster	1931 UC	Schuster	October 17, 1931	Heidelberg	K. Reinmuth	·	4.0 km (2.5 mi)	MPC · JPL
2019 van Albada	1935 SX_{1}	van Albada	September 28, 1935	Johannesburg	H. van Gent	moon	7.9 km (4.9 mi)	MPC · JPL
2020 Ukko	1936 FR	Ukko	March 18, 1936	Turku	Y. Väisälä	EOS	19 km (12 mi)	MPC · JPL
2021 Poincaré	1936 MA	Poincaré	June 26, 1936	Algiers	L. Boyer	·	5.0 km (3.1 mi)	MPC · JPL
2022 West	1938 CK	West	February 7, 1938	Heidelberg	K. Reinmuth	·	13 km (8.1 mi)	MPC · JPL
2023 Asaph	1952 SA	Asaph	September 16, 1952	Brooklyn	Indiana University	·	20 km (12 mi)	MPC · JPL
2024 McLaughlin	1952 UR	McLaughlin	October 23, 1952	Brooklyn	Indiana University	V · fast	7.9 km (4.9 mi)	MPC · JPL
2025 Nortia	1953 LG	Nortia	June 6, 1953	Johannesburg	J. Churms	·	43 km (27 mi)	MPC · JPL
2026 Cottrell	1955 FF	Cottrell	March 30, 1955	Brooklyn	Indiana University	NYS	14 km (8.7 mi)	MPC · JPL
2027 Shen Guo	1964 VR_{1}	Shen Guo	November 9, 1964	Nanking	Purple Mountain	EOS	17 km (11 mi)	MPC · JPL
2028 Janequeo	1968 OB_{1}	Janequeo	July 18, 1968	Cerro El Roble	C. Torres, Cofre, S.	·	3.2 km (2.0 mi)	MPC · JPL
2029 Binomi	1969 RB	Binomi	September 11, 1969	Zimmerwald	P. Wild	V	6.9 km (4.3 mi)	MPC · JPL
2030 Belyaev	1969 TA_{2}	Belyaev	October 8, 1969	Nauchnij	L. I. Chernykh	·	5.6 km (3.5 mi)	MPC · JPL
2031 BAM	1969 TG_{2}	BAM	October 8, 1969	Nauchnij	L. I. Chernykh	·	7.1 km (4.4 mi)	MPC · JPL
2032 Ethel	1970 OH	Ethel	July 30, 1970	Nauchnij	T. M. Smirnova	·	36 km (22 mi)	MPC · JPL
2033 Basilea	1973 CA	Basilea	February 6, 1973	Zimmerwald	P. Wild	·	5.7 km (3.5 mi)	MPC · JPL
2034 Bernoulli	1973 EE	Bernoulli	March 5, 1973	Zimmerwald	P. Wild	·	7.8 km (4.8 mi)	MPC · JPL
2035 Stearns	1973 SC	Stearns	September 21, 1973	El Leoncito	Gibson, J.	H	4.8 km (3.0 mi)	MPC · JPL
2036 Sheragul	1973 SY_{2}	Sheragul	September 22, 1973	Nauchnij	N. S. Chernykh	·	7.0 km (4.3 mi)	MPC · JPL
2037 Tripaxeptalis	1973 UB	Tripaxeptalis	October 25, 1973	Zimmerwald	P. Wild	moon	6.0 km (3.7 mi)	MPC · JPL
2038 Bistro	1973 WF	Bistro	November 24, 1973	Zimmerwald	P. Wild	PHO	11 km (6.8 mi)	MPC · JPL
2039 Payne-Gaposchkin	1974 CA	Payne-Gaposchkin	February 14, 1974	Harvard Observatory	Harvard Observatory	THM	14 km (8.7 mi)	MPC · JPL
2040 Chalonge	1974 HA	Chalonge	April 19, 1974	Zimmerwald	P. Wild	·	34 km (21 mi)	MPC · JPL
2041 Lancelot	2523 P-L	Lancelot	September 24, 1960	Palomar	C. J. van Houten, I. van Houten-Groeneveld, T. Gehrels	·	17 km (11 mi)	MPC · JPL
2042 Sitarski	4633 P-L	Sitarski	September 24, 1960	Palomar	C. J. van Houten, I. van Houten-Groeneveld, T. Gehrels	MRX	7.5 km (4.7 mi)	MPC · JPL
2043 Ortutay	1936 TH	Ortutay	November 12, 1936	Konkoly	G. Kulin	·	48 km (30 mi)	MPC · JPL
2044 Wirt	1950 VE	Wirt	November 8, 1950	Mount Hamilton	C. A. Wirtanen	moon	6.7 km (4.2 mi)	MPC · JPL
2045 Peking	1964 TB_{1}	Peking	October 8, 1964	Nanking	Purple Mountain	V · slow	9.7 km (6.0 mi)	MPC · JPL
2046 Leningrad	1968 UD_{1}	Leningrad	October 22, 1968	Nauchnij	T. M. Smirnova	THM	24 km (15 mi)	MPC · JPL
2047 Smetana	1971 UA_{1}	Smetana	October 26, 1971	Hamburg-Bergedorf	L. Kohoutek	H · moon	3.1 km (1.9 mi)	MPC · JPL
2048 Dwornik	1973 QA	Dwornik	August 27, 1973	Palomar	E. F. Helin	H	2.6 km (1.6 mi)	MPC · JPL
2049 Grietje	1973 SH	Grietje	September 29, 1973	Palomar	T. Gehrels	H	2.5 km (1.6 mi)	MPC · JPL
2050 Francis	1974 KA	Francis	May 28, 1974	Palomar	E. F. Helin	PHO	8.5 km (5.3 mi)	MPC · JPL
2051 Chang	1976 UC	Chang	October 23, 1976	Harvard Observatory	Harvard Observatory	KOR ·	14 km (8.7 mi)	MPC · JPL
2052 Tamriko	1976 UN	Tamriko	October 24, 1976	La Silla	R. M. West	EOS	27 km (17 mi)	MPC · JPL
2053 Nuki	1976 UO	Nuki	October 24, 1976	La Silla	R. M. West	GEF	11 km (6.8 mi)	MPC · JPL
2054 Gawain	4097 P-L	Gawain	September 24, 1960	Palomar	C. J. van Houten, I. van Houten-Groeneveld, T. Gehrels	·	18 km (11 mi)	MPC · JPL
2055 Dvořák	1974 DB	Dvořák	February 19, 1974	Hamburg-Bergedorf	L. Kohoutek	·	7.9 km (4.9 mi)	MPC · JPL
2056 Nancy	A909 TB	Nancy	October 15, 1909	Heidelberg	J. Helffrich	slow	7.8 km (4.8 mi)	MPC · JPL
2057 Rosemary	1934 RQ	Rosemary	September 7, 1934	Heidelberg	K. Reinmuth	·	13 km (8.1 mi)	MPC · JPL
2058 Róka	1938 BH	Róka	January 22, 1938	Konkoly	G. Kulin	THM ·	24 km (15 mi)	MPC · JPL
2059 Baboquivari	1963 UA	Baboquivari	October 16, 1963	Brooklyn	Indiana University	AMO +1 km (0.62 mi) · slow	2.3 km (1.4 mi)	MPC · JPL
2060 Chiron	1977 UB	Chiron	October 18, 1977	Palomar	C. T. Kowal	centaur · Comet (95P)	166 km (103 mi)	MPC · JPL
2061 Anza	1960 UA	Anza	October 22, 1960	Flagstaff	H. L. Giclas	AMO +1 km (0.62 mi)	2.6 km (1.6 mi)	MPC · JPL
2062 Aten	1976 AA	Aten	January 7, 1976	Palomar	E. F. Helin	ATE +1 km (0.62 mi)	1.1 km (0.68 mi)	MPC · JPL
2063 Bacchus	1977 HB	Bacchus	April 24, 1977	Palomar	C. T. Kowal	APO +1 km (0.62 mi)	1.0 km (0.62 mi)	MPC · JPL
2064 Thomsen	1942 RQ	Thomsen	September 8, 1942	Turku	L. Oterma	·	14 km (8.7 mi)	MPC · JPL
2065 Spicer	1959 RN	Spicer	September 9, 1959	Brooklyn	Indiana University	·	17 km (11 mi)	MPC · JPL
2066 Palala	1934 LB	Palala	June 4, 1934	Johannesburg	C. Jackson	·	17 km (11 mi)	MPC · JPL
2067 Aksnes	1936 DD	Aksnes	February 23, 1936	Turku	Y. Väisälä	3:2	46 km (29 mi)	MPC · JPL
2068 Dangreen	1948 AD	Dangreen	January 8, 1948	Nice	M. Laugier	·	34 km (21 mi)	MPC · JPL
2069 Hubble	1955 FT	Hubble	March 29, 1955	Brooklyn	Indiana University	·	38 km (24 mi)	MPC · JPL
2070 Humason	1964 TQ	Humason	October 14, 1964	Brooklyn	Indiana University	moon	4.6 km (2.9 mi)	MPC · JPL
2071 Nadezhda	1971 QS	Nadezhda	August 18, 1971	Nauchnij	T. M. Smirnova	·	5.0 km (3.1 mi)	MPC · JPL
2072 Kosmodemyanskaya	1973 QE_{2}	Kosmodemyanskaya	August 31, 1973	Nauchnij	T. M. Smirnova	·	4.8 km (3.0 mi)	MPC · JPL
2073 Janáček	1974 DK	Janáček	February 19, 1974	Hamburg-Bergedorf	L. Kohoutek	·	9.8 km (6.1 mi)	MPC · JPL
2074 Shoemaker	1974 UA	Shoemaker	October 17, 1974	Palomar	E. F. Helin	·	3.2 km (2.0 mi)	MPC · JPL
2075 Martinez	1974 VA	Martinez	November 9, 1974	El Leoncito	Félix Aguilar Observatory	PHO	6.3 km (3.9 mi)	MPC · JPL
2076 Levin	1974 WA	Levin	November 16, 1974	Harvard Observatory	Harvard Observatory	(2076)	3.6 km (2.2 mi)	MPC · JPL
2077 Kiangsu	1974 YA	Kiangsu	December 18, 1974	Nanking	Purple Mountain	slow	3.8 km (2.4 mi)	MPC · JPL
2078 Nanking	1975 AD	Nanking	January 12, 1975	Nanking	Purple Mountain	·	4.6 km (2.9 mi)	MPC · JPL
2079 Jacchia	1976 DB	Jacchia	February 23, 1976	Harvard Observatory	Harvard Observatory	EUN	8.9 km (5.5 mi)	MPC · JPL
2080 Jihlava	1976 DG	Jihlava	February 27, 1976	Zimmerwald	P. Wild	moon	5.8 km (3.6 mi)	MPC · JPL
2081 Sázava	1976 DH	Sázava	February 27, 1976	Zimmerwald	P. Wild	NYS	17 km (11 mi)	MPC · JPL
2082 Galahad	7588 P-L	Galahad	October 17, 1960	Palomar	C. J. van Houten, I. van Houten-Groeneveld, T. Gehrels	·	17 km (11 mi)	MPC · JPL
2083 Smither	1973 WB	Smither	November 29, 1973	Palomar	E. F. Helin	H	3.8 km (2.4 mi)	MPC · JPL
2084 Okayama	1935 CK	Okayama	February 7, 1935	Uccle	S. J. Arend	·	18 km (11 mi)	MPC · JPL
2085 Henan	1965 YA	Henan	December 20, 1965	Nanking	Purple Mountain	slow	13 km (8.1 mi)	MPC · JPL
2086 Newell	1966 BC	Newell	January 20, 1966	Brooklyn	Indiana University	·	6.1 km (3.8 mi)	MPC · JPL
2087 Kochera	1975 YC	Kochera	December 28, 1975	Zimmerwald	P. Wild	·	6.6 km (4.1 mi)	MPC · JPL
2088 Sahlia	1976 DJ	Sahlia	February 27, 1976	Zimmerwald	P. Wild	·	7.4 km (4.6 mi)	MPC · JPL
2089 Cetacea	1977 VF	Cetacea	November 9, 1977	Anderson Mesa	N. G. Thomas	slow	16 km (9.9 mi)	MPC · JPL
2090 Mizuho	1978 EA	Mizuho	March 12, 1978	Yakiimo	T. Urata	·	18 km (11 mi)	MPC · JPL
2091 Sampo	1941 HO	Sampo	April 26, 1941	Turku	Y. Väisälä	EOS	23 km (14 mi)	MPC · JPL
2092 Sumiana	1969 UP	Sumiana	October 16, 1969	Nauchnij	L. I. Chernykh	KOR	10 km (6.2 mi)	MPC · JPL
2093 Genichesk	1971 HX	Genichesk	April 28, 1971	Nauchnij	T. M. Smirnova	BAP	7.9 km (4.9 mi)	MPC · JPL
2094 Magnitka	1971 TC_{2}	Magnitka	October 12, 1971	Nauchnij	Crimean Astrophysical Observatory	(883)	10 km (6.2 mi)	MPC · JPL
2095 Parsifal	6036 P-L	Parsifal	September 24, 1960	Palomar	C. J. van Houten, I. van Houten-Groeneveld, T. Gehrels	·	9.2 km (5.7 mi)	MPC · JPL
2096 Väinö	1939 UC	Väinö	October 18, 1939	Turku	Y. Väisälä	·	11 km (6.8 mi)	MPC · JPL
2097 Galle	1953 PV	Galle	August 11, 1953	Heidelberg	K. Reinmuth	·	26 km (16 mi)	MPC · JPL
2098 Zyskin	1972 QE	Zyskin	August 18, 1972	Nauchnij	L. V. Zhuravleva	·	13 km (8.1 mi)	MPC · JPL
2099 Öpik	1977 VB	Öpik	November 8, 1977	Palomar	E. F. Helin	·	5.2 km (3.2 mi)	MPC · JPL
2100 Ra-Shalom	1978 RA	Ra-Shalom	September 10, 1978	Palomar	E. F. Helin	ATE +1 km (0.62 mi)	2.3 km (1.4 mi)	MPC · JPL

== 2101–2200 ==
back to top

Designation			Discovery			Properties		Ref
Permanent	Provisional	Named after	Date	Site	Discoverer(s)	Category	Diam.	Ref
2101 Adonis	1936 CA	Adonis	February 12, 1936	Uccle	E. Delporte	APO · PHA	600 m (2,000 ft)	MPC · JPL
2102 Tantalus	1975 YA	Tantalus	December 27, 1975	Palomar	C. T. Kowal	APO +1 km (0.62 mi) · PHA	1.6 km (0.99 mi)	MPC · JPL
2103 Laverna	1960 FL	Laverna	March 20, 1960	La Plata Observatory	La Plata	·	23 km (14 mi)	MPC · JPL
2104 Toronto	1963 PD	Toronto	August 15, 1963	Tautenburg Observatory	K. W. Kamper	·	36 km (22 mi)	MPC · JPL
2105 Gudy	1976 DA	Gudy	February 29, 1976	La Silla	H.-E. Schuster	PHO	20 km (12 mi)	MPC · JPL
2106 Hugo	1936 UF	Hugo	October 21, 1936	Nice	M. Laugier	·	17 km (11 mi)	MPC · JPL
2107 Ilmari	1941 VA	Ilmari	November 12, 1941	Turku	L. Oterma	·	17 km (11 mi)	MPC · JPL
2108 Otto Schmidt	1948 TR_{1}	Otto Schmidt	October 4, 1948	Crimea-Simeis	P. F. Shajn	·	29 km (18 mi)	MPC · JPL
2109 Dhôtel	1950 TH_{2}	Dhôtel	October 13, 1950	Uccle	S. J. Arend	·	20 km (12 mi)	MPC · JPL
2110 Moore-Sitterly	1962 RD	Moore-Sitterly	September 7, 1962	Brooklyn	Indiana University	·	5.7 km (3.5 mi)	MPC · JPL
2111 Tselina	1969 LG	Tselina	June 13, 1969	Nauchnij	T. M. Smirnova	EOS	23 km (14 mi)	MPC · JPL
2112 Ulyanov	1972 NP	Ulyanov	July 13, 1972	Nauchnij	T. M. Smirnova	·	7.5 km (4.7 mi)	MPC · JPL
2113 Ehrdni	1972 RJ_{2}	Ehrdni	September 11, 1972	Nauchnij	N. S. Chernykh	·	7.0 km (4.3 mi)	MPC · JPL
2114 Wallenquist	1976 HA	Wallenquist	April 19, 1976	Mount Stromlo	C.-I. Lagerkvist	THM ·	23 km (14 mi)	MPC · JPL
2115 Irakli	1976 UD	Irakli	October 24, 1976	La Silla	R. M. West	EOS	21 km (13 mi)	MPC · JPL
2116 Mtskheta	1976 UM	Mtskheta	October 24, 1976	La Silla	R. M. West	·	23 km (14 mi)	MPC · JPL
2117 Danmark	1978 AC	Danmark	January 9, 1978	La Silla	R. M. West	KOR	12 km (7.5 mi)	MPC · JPL
2118 Flagstaff	1978 PB	Flagstaff	August 5, 1978	Anderson Mesa	H. L. Giclas	·	11 km (6.8 mi)	MPC · JPL
2119 Schwall	1930 QG	Schwall	August 30, 1930	Heidelberg	M. F. Wolf, Ferrero, M.	·	5.2 km (3.2 mi)	MPC · JPL
2120 Tyumenia	1967 RM	Tyumenia	September 9, 1967	Nauchnij	T. M. Smirnova	·	51 km (32 mi)	MPC · JPL
2121 Sevastopol	1971 ME	Sevastopol	June 27, 1971	Nauchnij	T. M. Smirnova	(254) · moon	8.7 km (5.4 mi)	MPC · JPL
2122 Pyatiletka	1971 XB	Pyatiletka	December 14, 1971	Nauchnij	T. M. Smirnova	·	11 km (6.8 mi)	MPC · JPL
2123 Vltava	1973 SL_{2}	Vltava	September 22, 1973	Nauchnij	N. S. Chernykh	KOR	14 km (8.7 mi)	MPC · JPL
2124 Nissen	1974 MK	Nissen	June 20, 1974	El Leoncito	Félix Aguilar Observatory	EOS	15 km (9.3 mi)	MPC · JPL
2125 Karl-Ontjes	2005 P-L	Karl-Ontjes	September 24, 1960	Palomar	C. J. van Houten, I. van Houten-Groeneveld, T. Gehrels	·	11 km (6.8 mi)	MPC · JPL
2126 Gerasimovich	1970 QZ	Gerasimovich	August 30, 1970	Nauchnij	T. M. Smirnova	·	7.8 km (4.8 mi)	MPC · JPL
2127 Tanya	1971 KB_{1}	Tanya	May 29, 1971	Nauchnij	L. I. Chernykh	·	38 km (24 mi)	MPC · JPL
2128 Wetherill	1973 SB	Wetherill	September 26, 1973	Palomar	E. F. Helin	·	8.9 km (5.5 mi)	MPC · JPL
2129 Cosicosi	1973 SJ	Cosicosi	September 27, 1973	Zimmerwald	P. Wild	·	2.9 km (1.8 mi)	MPC · JPL
2130 Evdokiya	1974 QH_{1}	Evdokiya	August 22, 1974	Nauchnij	L. V. Zhuravleva	(883)	5.4 km (3.4 mi)	MPC · JPL
2131 Mayall	1975 RA	Mayall	September 3, 1975	Mount Hamilton	A. R. Klemola	H · moon	8.3 km (5.2 mi)	MPC · JPL
2132 Zhukov	1975 TW_{3}	Zhukov	October 3, 1975	Nauchnij	L. I. Chernykh	·	31 km (19 mi)	MPC · JPL
2133 Franceswright	1976 WB	Franceswright	November 20, 1976	Harvard Observatory	Harvard Observatory	·	9.1 km (5.7 mi)	MPC · JPL
2134 Dennispalm	1976 YB	Dennispalm	December 24, 1976	Palomar	C. T. Kowal	·	6.0 km (3.7 mi)	MPC · JPL
2135 Aristaeus	1977 HA	Aristaeus	April 17, 1977	Palomar	S. J. Bus, E. F. Helin	APO +1 km (0.62 mi) · PHA	870 m (2,850 ft)	MPC · JPL
2136 Jugta	1933 OC	Jugta	July 24, 1933	Heidelberg	K. Reinmuth	EOS	18 km (11 mi)	MPC · JPL
2137 Priscilla	1936 QZ	Priscilla	August 24, 1936	Heidelberg	K. Reinmuth	·	35 km (22 mi)	MPC · JPL
2138 Swissair	1968 HB	Swissair	April 17, 1968	Zimmerwald	P. Wild	slow	15 km (9.3 mi)	MPC · JPL
2139 Makharadze	1970 MC	Makharadze	June 30, 1970	Nauchnij	T. M. Smirnova	NYS	17 km (11 mi)	MPC · JPL
2140 Kemerovo	1970 PE	Kemerovo	August 3, 1970	Nauchnij	T. M. Smirnova	·	35 km (22 mi)	MPC · JPL
2141 Simferopol	1970 QC_{1}	Simferopol	August 30, 1970	Nauchnij	T. M. Smirnova	·	12 km (7.5 mi)	MPC · JPL
2142 Landau	1972 GA	Landau	April 3, 1972	Nauchnij	L. I. Chernykh	THM	20 km (12 mi)	MPC · JPL
2143 Jimarnold	1973 SA	Jimarnold	September 26, 1973	Palomar	E. F. Helin	·	4.9 km (3.0 mi)	MPC · JPL
2144 Marietta	1975 BC_{1}	Marietta	January 18, 1975	Nauchnij	L. I. Chernykh	KOR	16 km (9.9 mi)	MPC · JPL
2145 Blaauw	1976 UF	Blaauw	October 24, 1976	La Silla	R. M. West	·	41 km (25 mi)	MPC · JPL
2146 Stentor	1976 UQ	Stentor	October 24, 1976	La Silla	R. M. West	L4	51 km (32 mi)	MPC · JPL
2147 Kharadze	1976 US	Kharadze	October 25, 1976	La Silla	R. M. West	VER	23 km (14 mi)	MPC · JPL
2148 Epeios	1976 UW	Epeios	October 24, 1976	La Silla	R. M. West	L4	38 km (24 mi)	MPC · JPL
2149 Schwambraniya	1977 FX	Schwambraniya	March 22, 1977	Nauchnij	N. S. Chernykh	·	11 km (6.8 mi)	MPC · JPL
2150 Nyctimene	1977 TA	Nyctimene	October 13, 1977	Palomar	W. Sebok	H	6.1 km (3.8 mi)	MPC · JPL
2151 Hadwiger	1977 VX	Hadwiger	November 3, 1977	Zimmerwald	P. Wild	MAR	14 km (8.7 mi)	MPC · JPL
2152 Hannibal	1978 WK	Hannibal	November 19, 1978	Zimmerwald	P. Wild	·	45 km (28 mi)	MPC · JPL
2153 Akiyama	1978 XD	Akiyama	December 1, 1978	Harvard Observatory	Harvard Observatory	THM	23 km (14 mi)	MPC · JPL
2154 Underhill	2015 P-L	Underhill	September 24, 1960	Palomar	C. J. van Houten, I. van Houten-Groeneveld, T. Gehrels	·	13 km (8.1 mi)	MPC · JPL
2155 Wodan	6542 P-L	Wodan	September 24, 1960	Palomar	C. J. van Houten, I. van Houten-Groeneveld, T. Gehrels	KOR	8.5 km (5.3 mi)	MPC · JPL
2156 Kate	A917 SH	Kate	September 23, 1917	Crimea-Simeis	S. Belyavsky	·	8.1 km (5.0 mi)	MPC · JPL
2157 Ashbrook	A924 EF	Ashbrook	March 7, 1924	Heidelberg	K. Reinmuth	GEF · slow	13 km (8.1 mi)	MPC · JPL
2158 Tietjen	1933 OS	Tietjen	July 24, 1933	Heidelberg	K. Reinmuth	·	23 km (14 mi)	MPC · JPL
2159 Kukkamäki	1941 UX	Kukkamäki	October 16, 1941	Turku	L. Oterma	·	11 km (6.8 mi)	MPC · JPL
2160 Spitzer	1956 RL	Spitzer	September 7, 1956	Brooklyn	Indiana University	KOR	14 km (8.7 mi)	MPC · JPL
2161 Grissom	1963 UD	Grissom	October 17, 1963	Brooklyn	Indiana University	·	16 km (9.9 mi)	MPC · JPL
2162 Anhui	1966 BE	Anhui	January 30, 1966	Nanking	Purple Mountain	·	7.3 km (4.5 mi)	MPC · JPL
2163 Korczak	1971 SP_{1}	Korczak	September 16, 1971	Nauchnij	Crimean Astrophysical Observatory	THM	24 km (15 mi)	MPC · JPL
2164 Lyalya	1972 RM_{2}	Lyalya	September 11, 1972	Nauchnij	N. S. Chernykh	THM	20 km (12 mi)	MPC · JPL
2165 Young	1956 RJ	Young	September 7, 1956	Brooklyn	Indiana University	THM	27 km (17 mi)	MPC · JPL
2166 Handahl	1936 QB	Handahl	August 13, 1936	Crimea-Simeis	G. N. Neujmin	·	4.3 km (2.7 mi)	MPC · JPL
2167 Erin	1971 LA	Erin	June 1, 1971	Bickley	Perth Observatory	·	9.0 km (5.6 mi)	MPC · JPL
2168 Swope	1955 RF_{1}	Swope	September 14, 1955	Brooklyn	Indiana University	·	8.2 km (5.1 mi)	MPC · JPL
2169 Taiwan	1964 VP_{1}	Taiwan	November 9, 1964	Nanking	Purple Mountain	AST	19 km (12 mi)	MPC · JPL
2170 Byelorussia	1971 SZ	Byelorussia	September 16, 1971	Nauchnij	Crimean Astrophysical Observatory	·	9.4 km (5.8 mi)	MPC · JPL
2171 Kiev	1973 QD_{1}	Kiev	August 28, 1973	Nauchnij	T. M. Smirnova	moon	8.0 km (5.0 mi)	MPC · JPL
2172 Plavsk	1973 QA_{2}	Plavsk	August 31, 1973	Nauchnij	T. M. Smirnova	·	20 km (12 mi)	MPC · JPL
2173 Maresjev	1974 QG_{1}	Maresjev	August 22, 1974	Nauchnij	L. V. Zhuravleva	·	28 km (17 mi)	MPC · JPL
2174 Asmodeus	1975 TA	Asmodeus	October 8, 1975	Palomar	S. J. Bus, J. Huchra	·	5.2 km (3.2 mi)	MPC · JPL
2175 Andrea Doria	1977 TY	Andrea Doria	October 12, 1977	Zimmerwald	P. Wild	·	3.9 km (2.4 mi)	MPC · JPL
2176 Donar	2529 P-L	Donar	September 24, 1960	Palomar	C. J. van Houten, I. van Houten-Groeneveld, T. Gehrels	KOR	11 km (6.8 mi)	MPC · JPL
2177 Oliver	6551 P-L	Oliver	September 24, 1960	Palomar	C. J. van Houten, I. van Houten-Groeneveld, T. Gehrels	·	20 km (12 mi)	MPC · JPL
2178 Kazakhstania	1972 RA_{2}	Kazakhstania	September 11, 1972	Nauchnij	N. S. Chernykh	moon	4.3 km (2.7 mi)	MPC · JPL
2179 Platzeck	1965 MA	Platzeck	June 28, 1965	El Leoncito	A. R. Klemola	EOS	20 km (12 mi)	MPC · JPL
2180 Marjaleena	1940 RJ	Marjaleena	September 8, 1940	Turku	H. Alikoski	EOS	21 km (13 mi)	MPC · JPL
2181 Fogelin	1942 YA	Fogelin	December 28, 1942	Heidelberg	K. Reinmuth	EUN	10 km (6.2 mi)	MPC · JPL
2182 Semirot	1953 FH_{1}	Semirot	March 21, 1953	Brooklyn	Indiana University	THM	24 km (15 mi)	MPC · JPL
2183 Neufang	1959 OB	Neufang	July 26, 1959	Bloemfontein	C. Hoffmeister	·	24 km (15 mi)	MPC · JPL
2184 Fujian	1964 TV_{2}	Fujian	October 9, 1964	Nanking	Purple Mountain	·	36 km (22 mi)	MPC · JPL
2185 Guangdong	1965 WO	Guangdong	November 20, 1965	Nanking	Purple Mountain	·	15 km (9.3 mi)	MPC · JPL
2186 Keldysh	1973 SQ_{4}	Keldysh	September 27, 1973	Nauchnij	L. I. Chernykh	·	13 km (8.1 mi)	MPC · JPL
2187 La Silla	1976 UH	La Silla	October 24, 1976	La Silla	R. M. West	·	12 km (7.5 mi)	MPC · JPL
2188 Orlenok	1976 UL_{4}	Orlenok	October 28, 1976	Nauchnij	L. V. Zhuravleva	KOR	14 km (8.7 mi)	MPC · JPL
2189 Zaragoza	1975 QK	Zaragoza	August 30, 1975	El Leoncito	Félix Aguilar Observatory	PHO	6.3 km (3.9 mi)	MPC · JPL
2190 Coubertin	1976 GV_{3}	Coubertin	April 2, 1976	Nauchnij	N. S. Chernykh	·	15 km (9.3 mi)	MPC · JPL
2191 Uppsala	1977 PA_{1}	Uppsala	August 6, 1977	Mount Stromlo	C.-I. Lagerkvist	EOS	18 km (11 mi)	MPC · JPL
2192 Pyatigoriya	1972 HP	Pyatigoriya	April 18, 1972	Nauchnij	T. M. Smirnova	·	29 km (18 mi)	MPC · JPL
2193 Jackson	1926 KB	Jackson	May 18, 1926	Johannesburg	H. E. Wood	·	58 km (36 mi)	MPC · JPL
2194 Arpola	1940 GE	Arpola	April 3, 1940	Turku	Y. Väisälä	·	9.0 km (5.6 mi)	MPC · JPL
2195 Tengström	1941 SP_{1}	Tengström	September 27, 1941	Turku	L. Oterma	·	8.6 km (5.3 mi)	MPC · JPL
2196 Ellicott	1965 BC	Ellicott	January 29, 1965	Brooklyn	Indiana University	CYB	57 km (35 mi)	MPC · JPL
2197 Shanghai	1965 YN	Shanghai	December 30, 1965	Nanking	Purple Mountain	THM	20 km (12 mi)	MPC · JPL
2198 Ceplecha	1975 VF	Ceplecha	November 7, 1975	Harvard Observatory	Harvard Observatory	(5)	4.4 km (2.7 mi)	MPC · JPL
2199 Kleť	1978 LA	Kleť	June 6, 1978	Kleť	A. Mrkos	·	7.0 km (4.3 mi)	MPC · JPL
2200 Pasadena	6090 P-L	Pasadena	September 24, 1960	Palomar	C. J. van Houten, I. van Houten-Groeneveld, T. Gehrels	·	8.1 km (5.0 mi)	MPC · JPL

== 2201–2300 ==
back to top

Designation			Discovery			Properties		Ref
Permanent	Provisional	Named after	Date	Site	Discoverer(s)	Category	Diam.	Ref
2201 Oljato	1947 XC	Oljato	December 12, 1947	Flagstaff	H. L. Giclas	APO +1 km (0.62 mi) · PHA	1.8 km (1.1 mi)	MPC · JPL
2202 Pele	1972 RA	Pele	September 7, 1972	Mount Hamilton	A. R. Klemola	AMO +1 km (0.62 mi)	1.4 km (0.87 mi)	MPC · JPL
2203 van Rhijn	1935 SQ_{1}	van Rhijn	September 28, 1935	Johannesburg	H. van Gent	THM	22 km (14 mi)	MPC · JPL
2204 Lyyli	1943 EQ	Lyyli	March 3, 1943	Turku	Y. Väisälä	·	25 km (16 mi)	MPC · JPL
2205 Glinka	1973 SU_{4}	Glinka	September 27, 1973	Nauchnij	L. I. Chernykh	·	14 km (8.7 mi)	MPC · JPL
2206 Gabrova	1976 GR_{3}	Gabrova	April 1, 1976	Nauchnij	N. S. Chernykh	EOS	20 km (12 mi)	MPC · JPL
2207 Antenor	1977 QH_{1}	Antenor	August 19, 1977	Nauchnij	N. S. Chernykh	L5	98 km (61 mi)	MPC · JPL
2208 Pushkin	1977 QL_{3}	Pushkin	August 22, 1977	Nauchnij	N. S. Chernykh	CYB	41 km (25 mi)	MPC · JPL
2209 Tianjin	1978 US_{1}	Tianjin	October 28, 1978	Nanking	Purple Mountain	KOR	17 km (11 mi)	MPC · JPL
2210 Lois	9597 P-L	Lois	September 24, 1960	Palomar	C. J. van Houten, I. van Houten-Groeneveld, T. Gehrels	NYS	4.5 km (2.8 mi)	MPC · JPL
2211 Hanuman	1951 WO_{2}	Hanuman	November 26, 1951	Mount Wilson	L. E. Cunningham	URS	18 km (11 mi)	MPC · JPL
2212 Hephaistos	1978 SB	Hephaistos	September 27, 1978	Nauchnij	L. I. Chernykh	APO +1 km (0.62 mi)	5.7 km (3.5 mi)	MPC · JPL
2213 Meeus	1935 SO_{1}	Meeus	September 24, 1935	Uccle	E. Delporte	·	4.9 km (3.0 mi)	MPC · JPL
2214 Carol	1953 GF	Carol	April 7, 1953	Heidelberg	K. Reinmuth	·	26 km (16 mi)	MPC · JPL
2215 Sichuan	1964 VX_{2}	Sichuan	November 12, 1964	Nanking	Purple Mountain	·	13 km (8.1 mi)	MPC · JPL
2216 Kerch	1971 LF	Kerch	June 12, 1971	Nauchnij	T. M. Smirnova	EOS	18 km (11 mi)	MPC · JPL
2217 Eltigen	1971 SK_{2}	Eltigen	September 26, 1971	Nauchnij	T. M. Smirnova	THM	29 km (18 mi)	MPC · JPL
2218 Wotho	1975 AK	Wotho	January 10, 1975	Zimmerwald	P. Wild	·	28 km (17 mi)	MPC · JPL
2219 Mannucci	1975 LU	Mannucci	June 13, 1975	El Leoncito	Félix Aguilar Observatory	·	39 km (24 mi)	MPC · JPL
2220 Hicks	1975 VB	Hicks	November 4, 1975	Palomar	E. F. Helin	THM	16 km (9.9 mi)	MPC · JPL
2221 Chilton	1976 QC	Chilton	August 25, 1976	Harvard Observatory	Harvard Observatory	MAR	6.6 km (4.1 mi)	MPC · JPL
2222 Lermontov	1977 ST_{1}	Lermontov	September 19, 1977	Nauchnij	N. S. Chernykh	THM	30 km (19 mi)	MPC · JPL
2223 Sarpedon	1977 TL_{3}	Sarpedon	October 4, 1977	Nanking	Purple Mountain	L5	77 km (48 mi)	MPC · JPL
2224 Tucson	2528 P-L	Tucson	September 24, 1960	Palomar	C. J. van Houten, I. van Houten-Groeneveld, T. Gehrels	KOR	23 km (14 mi)	MPC · JPL
2225 Serkowski	6546 P-L	Serkowski	September 24, 1960	Palomar	C. J. van Houten, I. van Houten-Groeneveld, T. Gehrels	KOR	10 km (6.2 mi)	MPC · JPL
2226 Cunitza	1936 QC_{1}	Cunitza	August 26, 1936	Heidelberg	A. Bohrmann	KOR	15 km (9.3 mi)	MPC · JPL
2227 Otto Struve	1955 RX	Otto Struve	September 13, 1955	Brooklyn	Indiana University	·	4.7 km (2.9 mi)	MPC · JPL
2228 Soyuz-Apollo	1977 OH	Soyuz-Apollo	July 19, 1977	Nauchnij	N. S. Chernykh	THM	26 km (16 mi)	MPC · JPL
2229 Mezzarco	1977 RO	Mezzarco	September 7, 1977	Zimmerwald	P. Wild	·	8.8 km (5.5 mi)	MPC · JPL
2230 Yunnan	1978 UT_{1}	Yunnan	October 29, 1978	Nanking	Purple Mountain	KOR	11 km (6.8 mi)	MPC · JPL
2231 Durrell	1941 SG	Durrell	September 21, 1941	Uccle	S. J. Arend	·	16 km (9.9 mi)	MPC · JPL
2232 Altaj	1969 RD_{2}	Altaj	September 15, 1969	Nauchnij	B. A. Burnasheva	·	12 km (7.5 mi)	MPC · JPL
2233 Kuznetsov	1972 XE_{1}	Kuznetsov	December 3, 1972	Nauchnij	L. V. Zhuravleva	·	6.7 km (4.2 mi)	MPC · JPL
2234 Schmadel	1977 HD	Schmadel	April 27, 1977	La Silla	H.-E. Schuster	·	9.5 km (5.9 mi)	MPC · JPL
2235 Vittore	A924 GA	Vittore	April 5, 1924	Heidelberg	K. Reinmuth	·	42 km (26 mi)	MPC · JPL
2236 Austrasia	1933 FX	Austrasia	March 23, 1933	Heidelberg	K. Reinmuth	·	9.1 km (5.7 mi)	MPC · JPL
2237 Melnikov	1938 TB	Melnikov	October 2, 1938	Crimea-Simeis	G. N. Neujmin	THM ·	21 km (13 mi)	MPC · JPL
2238 Steshenko	1972 RQ_{1}	Steshenko	September 11, 1972	Nauchnij	N. S. Chernykh	·	15 km (9.3 mi)	MPC · JPL
2239 Paracelsus	1978 RC	Paracelsus	September 13, 1978	Zimmerwald	P. Wild	·	34 km (21 mi)	MPC · JPL
2240 Tsai	1978 YA	Tsai	December 30, 1978	Harvard Observatory	Harvard Observatory	THM	24 km (15 mi)	MPC · JPL
2241 Alcathous	1979 WM	Alcathous	November 22, 1979	Palomar	C. T. Kowal	L5	114 km (71 mi)	MPC · JPL
2242 Balaton	1936 TG	Balaton	October 13, 1936	Konkoly	G. Kulin	moon	5.8 km (3.6 mi)	MPC · JPL
2243 Lönnrot	1941 SA_{1}	Lönnrot	September 25, 1941	Turku	Y. Väisälä	·	8.6 km (5.3 mi)	MPC · JPL
2244 Tesla	1952 UW_{1}	Tesla	October 22, 1952	Belgrade	M. B. Protić	·	24 km (15 mi)	MPC · JPL
2245 Hekatostos	1968 BC	Hekatostos	January 24, 1968	Nauchnij	L. I. Chernykh	·	29 km (18 mi)	MPC · JPL
2246 Bowell	1979 XH	Bowell	December 14, 1979	Anderson Mesa	E. Bowell	3:2	48 km (30 mi)	MPC · JPL
2247 Hiroshima	6512 P-L	Hiroshima	September 24, 1960	Palomar	C. J. van Houten, I. van Houten-Groeneveld, T. Gehrels	·	4.4 km (2.7 mi)	MPC · JPL
2248 Kanda	1933 DE	Kanda	February 27, 1933	Heidelberg	K. Reinmuth	THM	26 km (16 mi)	MPC · JPL
2249 Yamamoto	1942 GA	Yamamoto	April 6, 1942	Heidelberg	K. Reinmuth	·	34 km (21 mi)	MPC · JPL
2250 Stalingrad	1972 HN	Stalingrad	April 18, 1972	Nauchnij	T. M. Smirnova	THM ·	19 km (12 mi)	MPC · JPL
2251 Tikhov	1977 SU_{1}	Tikhov	September 19, 1977	Nauchnij	N. S. Chernykh	·	29 km (18 mi)	MPC · JPL
2252 CERGA	1978 VT	CERGA	November 1, 1978	Caussols	K. Tomita	(5)	18 km (11 mi)	MPC · JPL
2253 Espinette	1932 PB	Espinette	July 30, 1932	Williams Bay	G. Van Biesbroeck	·	5.5 km (3.4 mi)	MPC · JPL
2254 Requiem	1977 QJ_{1}	Requiem	August 19, 1977	Nauchnij	N. S. Chernykh	·	10 km (6.2 mi)	MPC · JPL
2255 Qinghai	1977 VK_{1}	Qinghai	November 3, 1977	Nanking	Purple Mountain	·	24 km (15 mi)	MPC · JPL
2256 Wiśniewski	4519 P-L	Wiśniewski	September 24, 1960	Palomar	C. J. van Houten, I. van Houten-Groeneveld, T. Gehrels	THM	17 km (11 mi)	MPC · JPL
2257 Kaarina	1939 QB	Kaarina	August 18, 1939	Turku	H. Alikoski	·	5.7 km (3.5 mi)	MPC · JPL
2258 Viipuri	1939 TA	Viipuri	October 7, 1939	Turku	Y. Väisälä	·	26 km (16 mi)	MPC · JPL
2259 Sofievka	1971 OG	Sofievka	July 19, 1971	Nauchnij	B. A. Burnasheva	·	17 km (11 mi)	MPC · JPL
2260 Neoptolemus	1975 WM_{1}	Neoptolemus	November 26, 1975	Nanking	Purple Mountain	L4	76 km (47 mi)	MPC · JPL
2261 Keeler	1977 HC	Keeler	April 20, 1977	Mount Hamilton	A. R. Klemola	PHO	7.3 km (4.5 mi)	MPC · JPL
2262 Mitidika	1978 RB	Mitidika	September 10, 1978	Zimmerwald	P. Wild	·	8.8 km (5.5 mi)	MPC · JPL
2263 Shaanxi	1978 UW_{1}	Shaanxi	October 30, 1978	Nanking	Purple Mountain	EOS · slow	27 km (17 mi)	MPC · JPL
2264 Sabrina	1979 YK	Sabrina	December 16, 1979	Anderson Mesa	E. Bowell	THM	34 km (21 mi)	MPC · JPL
2265 Verbaandert	1950 DB	Verbaandert	February 17, 1950	Uccle	S. J. Arend	·	12 km (7.5 mi)	MPC · JPL
2266 Tchaikovsky	1974 VK	Tchaikovsky	November 12, 1974	Nauchnij	L. I. Chernykh	CYB	47 km (29 mi)	MPC · JPL
2267 Agassiz	1977 RF	Agassiz	September 9, 1977	Harvard Observatory	Harvard Observatory	·	5.1 km (3.2 mi)	MPC · JPL
2268 Szmytowna	1942 VW	Szmytowna	November 6, 1942	Turku	L. Oterma	KOR	13 km (8.1 mi)	MPC · JPL
2269 Efremiana	1976 JA_{2}	Efremiana	May 2, 1976	Nauchnij	N. S. Chernykh	·	30 km (19 mi)	MPC · JPL
2270 Yazhi	1980 ED	Yazhi	March 14, 1980	Anderson Mesa	E. Bowell	THM	26 km (16 mi)	MPC · JPL
2271 Kiso	1976 UV_{5}	Kiso	October 22, 1976	Kiso	H. Kosai, K. Furukawa	·	31 km (19 mi)	MPC · JPL
2272 Montezuma	1972 FA	Montezuma	March 16, 1972	Palomar	T. Gehrels	H	5.3 km (3.3 mi)	MPC · JPL
2273 Yarilo	1975 EV_{1}	Yarilo	March 6, 1975	Nauchnij	L. I. Chernykh	·	5.6 km (3.5 mi)	MPC · JPL
2274 Ehrsson	1976 EA	Ehrsson	March 2, 1976	Kvistaberg	C.-I. Lagerkvist	·	7.7 km (4.8 mi)	MPC · JPL
2275 Cuitlahuac	1979 MH	Cuitlahuac	June 16, 1979	La Silla	H.-E. Schuster	·	7.0 km (4.3 mi)	MPC · JPL
2276 Warck	1933 QA	Warck	August 18, 1933	Uccle	E. Delporte	·	15 km (9.3 mi)	MPC · JPL
2277 Moreau	1950 DS	Moreau	February 18, 1950	Uccle	S. J. Arend	·	12 km (7.5 mi)	MPC · JPL
2278 Götz	1953 GE	Götz	April 7, 1953	Heidelberg	K. Reinmuth	·	12 km (7.5 mi)	MPC · JPL
2279 Barto	1968 DL	Barto	February 25, 1968	Nauchnij	L. I. Chernykh	NYS	14 km (8.7 mi)	MPC · JPL
2280 Kunikov	1971 SL_{2}	Kunikov	September 26, 1971	Nauchnij	T. M. Smirnova	moon	6.1 km (3.8 mi)	MPC · JPL
2281 Biela	1971 UQ_{1}	Biela	October 26, 1971	Hamburg-Bergedorf	L. Kohoutek	·	6.1 km (3.8 mi)	MPC · JPL
2282 Andrés Bello	1974 FE	Andrés Bello	March 22, 1974	Cerro El Roble	C. Torres	·	6.0 km (3.7 mi)	MPC · JPL
2283 Bunke	1974 SV_{4}	Bunke	September 26, 1974	Nauchnij	L. V. Zhuravleva	·	6.0 km (3.7 mi)	MPC · JPL
2284 San Juan	1974 TG_{1}	San Juan	October 10, 1974	El Leoncito	Félix Aguilar Observatory	·	10 km (6.2 mi)	MPC · JPL
2285 Ron Helin	1976 QB	Ron Helin	August 27, 1976	Palomar	S. J. Bus	·	4.4 km (2.7 mi)	MPC · JPL
2286 Fesenkov	1977 NH	Fesenkov	July 14, 1977	Nauchnij	N. S. Chernykh	·	6.7 km (4.2 mi)	MPC · JPL
2287 Kalmykia	1977 QK_{3}	Kalmykia	August 22, 1977	Nauchnij	N. S. Chernykh	·	6.9 km (4.3 mi)	MPC · JPL
2288 Karolinum	1979 UZ	Karolinum	October 19, 1979	Kleť	L. Brožek	·	19 km (12 mi)	MPC · JPL
2289 McMillan	6567 P-L	McMillan	September 24, 1960	Palomar	C. J. van Houten, I. van Houten-Groeneveld, T. Gehrels	MIS	12 km (7.5 mi)	MPC · JPL
2290 Helffrich	1932 CD_{1}	Helffrich	February 14, 1932	Heidelberg	K. Reinmuth	·	17 km (11 mi)	MPC · JPL
2291 Kevo	1941 FS	Kevo	March 19, 1941	Turku	L. Oterma	·	41 km (25 mi)	MPC · JPL
2292 Seili	1942 RM	Seili	September 7, 1942	Turku	Y. Väisälä	·	11 km (6.8 mi)	MPC · JPL
2293 Guernica	1977 EH_{1}	Guernica	March 13, 1977	Nauchnij	N. S. Chernykh	THM	30 km (19 mi)	MPC · JPL
2294 Andronikov	1977 PL_{1}	Andronikov	August 14, 1977	Nauchnij	N. S. Chernykh	·	15 km (9.3 mi)	MPC · JPL
2295 Matusovskij	1977 QD_{1}	Matusovskij	August 19, 1977	Nauchnij	N. S. Chernykh	·	21 km (13 mi)	MPC · JPL
2296 Kugultinov	1975 BA_{1}	Kugultinov	January 18, 1975	Nauchnij	L. I. Chernykh	THM	22 km (14 mi)	MPC · JPL
2297 Daghestan	1978 RE	Daghestan	September 1, 1978	Nauchnij	N. S. Chernykh	THM	27 km (17 mi)	MPC · JPL
2298 Cindijon	A915 TA	Cindijon	October 2, 1915	Heidelberg	M. F. Wolf	·	6.2 km (3.9 mi)	MPC · JPL
2299 Hanko	1941 SZ	Hanko	September 25, 1941	Turku	Y. Väisälä	(5)	6.5 km (4.0 mi)	MPC · JPL
2300 Stebbins	1953 TG_{2}	Stebbins	October 10, 1953	Brooklyn	Indiana University	KOR	12 km (7.5 mi)	MPC · JPL

== 2301–2400 ==
back to top

Designation			Discovery			Properties		Ref
Permanent	Provisional	Named after	Date	Site	Discoverer(s)	Category	Diam.	Ref
2301 Whitford	1965 WJ	Whitford	November 20, 1965	Brooklyn	Indiana University	·	17 km (11 mi)	MPC · JPL
2302 Florya	1972 TL_{2}	Florya	October 2, 1972	Nauchnij	N. E. Kuročkin	EUN	11 km (6.8 mi)	MPC · JPL
2303 Retsina	1979 FK	Retsina	March 24, 1979	Zimmerwald	P. Wild	·	14 km (8.7 mi)	MPC · JPL
2304 Slavia	1979 KB	Slavia	May 18, 1979	Kleť	A. Mrkos	EUN	12 km (7.5 mi)	MPC · JPL
2305 King	1980 RJ_{1}	King	September 12, 1980	Harvard Observatory	Harvard Observatory	·	13 km (8.1 mi)	MPC · JPL
2306 Bauschinger	1939 PM	Bauschinger	August 15, 1939	Heidelberg	K. Reinmuth	PAD	19 km (12 mi)	MPC · JPL
2307 Garuda	1957 HJ	Garuda	April 18, 1957	La Plata Observatory	La Plata	·	40 km (25 mi)	MPC · JPL
2308 Schilt	1967 JM	Schilt	May 6, 1967	El Leoncito	C. U. Cesco, A. R. Klemola	·	18 km (11 mi)	MPC · JPL
2309 Mr. Spock	1971 QX_{1}	Mr. Spock	August 16, 1971	El Leoncito	Gibson, J.	EOS	20 km (12 mi)	MPC · JPL
2310 Olshaniya	1974 SU_{4}	Olshaniya	September 26, 1974	Nauchnij	L. V. Zhuravleva	THM	26 km (16 mi)	MPC · JPL
2311 El Leoncito	1974 TA_{1}	El Leoncito	October 10, 1974	El Leoncito	Félix Aguilar Observatory	CYB	53 km (33 mi)	MPC · JPL
2312 Duboshin	1976 GU_{2}	Duboshin	April 1, 1976	Nauchnij	N. S. Chernykh	3:2	50 km (31 mi)	MPC · JPL
2313 Aruna	1976 TA	Aruna	October 15, 1976	Anderson Mesa	H. L. Giclas	NYS	15 km (9.3 mi)	MPC · JPL
2314 Field	1977 VD	Field	November 12, 1977	Harvard Observatory	Harvard Observatory	·	3.8 km (2.4 mi)	MPC · JPL
2315 Czechoslovakia	1980 DZ	Czechoslovakia	February 19, 1980	Kleť	Z. Vávrová	EOS	25 km (16 mi)	MPC · JPL
2316 Jo-Ann	1980 RH	Jo-Ann	September 2, 1980	Anderson Mesa	E. Bowell	MAS	13 km (8.1 mi)	MPC · JPL
2317 Galya	2524 P-L	Galya	September 24, 1960	Palomar	C. J. van Houten, I. van Houten-Groeneveld, T. Gehrels	·	7.1 km (4.4 mi)	MPC · JPL
2318 Lubarsky	6521 P-L	Lubarsky	September 24, 1960	Palomar	C. J. van Houten, I. van Houten-Groeneveld, T. Gehrels	·	4.7 km (2.9 mi)	MPC · JPL
2319 Aristides	7631 P-L	Aristides	October 17, 1960	Palomar	C. J. van Houten, I. van Houten-Groeneveld, T. Gehrels	KOR	11 km (6.8 mi)	MPC · JPL
2320 Blarney	1979 QJ	Blarney	August 29, 1979	Zimmerwald	P. Wild	·	36 km (22 mi)	MPC · JPL
2321 Lužnice	1980 DB_{1}	Lužnice	February 19, 1980	Kleť	Z. Vávrová	·	22 km (14 mi)	MPC · JPL
2322 Kitt Peak	1954 UQ_{2}	Kitt Peak	October 28, 1954	Brooklyn	Indiana University	·	16 km (9.9 mi)	MPC · JPL
2323 Zverev	1976 SF_{2}	Zverev	September 24, 1976	Nauchnij	N. S. Chernykh	·	22 km (14 mi)	MPC · JPL
2324 Janice	1978 VS_{4}	Janice	November 7, 1978	Palomar	E. F. Helin, S. J. Bus	THM	28 km (17 mi)	MPC · JPL
2325 Chernykh	1979 SP	Chernykh	September 25, 1979	Kleť	A. Mrkos	THM	23 km (14 mi)	MPC · JPL
2326 Tololo	1965 QC	Tololo	August 29, 1965	Brooklyn	Indiana University	BRA	43 km (27 mi)	MPC · JPL
2327 Gershberg	1969 TQ_{4}	Gershberg	October 13, 1969	Nauchnij	B. A. Burnasheva	·	5.4 km (3.4 mi)	MPC · JPL
2328 Robeson	1972 HW	Robeson	April 19, 1972	Nauchnij	T. M. Smirnova	·	13 km (8.1 mi)	MPC · JPL
2329 Orthos	1976 WA	Orthos	November 19, 1976	La Silla	H.-E. Schuster	APO +1 km (0.62 mi)	4.3 km (2.7 mi)	MPC · JPL
2330 Ontake	1977 DS_{3}	Ontake	February 18, 1977	Kiso	H. Kosai, K. Furukawa	·	33 km (21 mi)	MPC · JPL
2331 Parvulesco	1936 EA	Parvulesco	March 12, 1936	Uccle	E. Delporte	·	5.7 km (3.5 mi)	MPC · JPL
2332 Kalm	1940 GH	Kalm	April 4, 1940	Turku	L. Oterma	·	32 km (20 mi)	MPC · JPL
2333 Porthan	1943 EP	Porthan	March 3, 1943	Turku	Y. Väisälä	ADE	23 km (14 mi)	MPC · JPL
2334 Cuffey	1962 HD	Cuffey	April 27, 1962	Brooklyn	Indiana University	·	6.4 km (4.0 mi)	MPC · JPL
2335 James	1974 UB	James	October 17, 1974	Palomar	E. F. Helin	·	6.4 km (4.0 mi)	MPC · JPL
2336 Xinjiang	1975 WL_{1}	Xinjiang	November 26, 1975	Nanking	Purple Mountain	THM	22 km (14 mi)	MPC · JPL
2337 Boubín	1976 UH_{1}	Boubín	October 22, 1976	Zimmerwald	P. Wild	EUN · moon	8.0 km (5.0 mi)	MPC · JPL
2338 Bokhan	1977 QA_{3}	Bokhan	August 22, 1977	Nauchnij	N. S. Chernykh	KOR	11 km (6.8 mi)	MPC · JPL
2339 Anacreon	2509 P-L	Anacreon	September 24, 1960	Palomar	C. J. van Houten, I. van Houten-Groeneveld, T. Gehrels	slow	7.3 km (4.5 mi)	MPC · JPL
2340 Hathor	1976 UA	Hathor	October 22, 1976	Palomar	C. T. Kowal	ATE · PHA	300 m (980 ft)	MPC · JPL
2341 Aoluta	1976 YU_{1}	Aoluta	December 16, 1976	Nauchnij	L. I. Chernykh	·	6.5 km (4.0 mi)	MPC · JPL
2342 Lebedev	1968 UQ	Lebedev	October 22, 1968	Nauchnij	T. M. Smirnova	THM	22 km (14 mi)	MPC · JPL
2343 Siding Spring	1979 MD_{4}	Siding Spring	June 25, 1979	Siding Spring	E. F. Helin, S. J. Bus	moon · fast	5.2 km (3.2 mi)	MPC · JPL
2344 Xizang	1979 SC_{1}	Xizang	September 27, 1979	Nanking	Purple Mountain	·	16 km (9.9 mi)	MPC · JPL
2345 Fučik	1974 OS	Fučik	July 25, 1974	Nauchnij	T. M. Smirnova	EOS	25 km (16 mi)	MPC · JPL
2346 Lilio	1934 CB	Lilio	February 5, 1934	Heidelberg	K. Reinmuth	·	10 km (6.2 mi)	MPC · JPL
2347 Vinata	1936 TK	Vinata	October 7, 1936	Flagstaff	H. L. Giclas	·	25 km (16 mi)	MPC · JPL
2348 Michkovitch	1939 AA	Michkovitch	January 10, 1939	Belgrade	M. B. Protić	·	4.6 km (2.9 mi)	MPC · JPL
2349 Kurchenko	1970 OG	Kurchenko	July 30, 1970	Nauchnij	T. M. Smirnova	·	19 km (12 mi)	MPC · JPL
2350 von Lüde	1938 CG	von Lüde	February 6, 1938	Heidelberg	A. Bohrmann	·	5.8 km (3.6 mi)	MPC · JPL
2351 O'Higgins	1964 VD	O'Higgins	November 3, 1964	Brooklyn	Indiana University	·	5.8 km (3.6 mi)	MPC · JPL
2352 Kurchatov	1969 RY	Kurchatov	September 10, 1969	Nauchnij	L. I. Chernykh	·	30 km (19 mi)	MPC · JPL
2353 Alva	1975 UD	Alva	October 27, 1975	Zimmerwald	P. Wild	·	13 km (8.1 mi)	MPC · JPL
2354 Lavrov	1978 PZ_{3}	Lavrov	August 9, 1978	Nauchnij	L. I. Chernykh, N. S. Chernykh	·	13 km (8.1 mi)	MPC · JPL
2355 Nei Monggol	1978 UV_{1}	Nei Monggol	October 30, 1978	Nanking	Purple Mountain	EOS	17 km (11 mi)	MPC · JPL
2356 Hirons	1979 UJ	Hirons	October 17, 1979	Anderson Mesa	E. Bowell	·	43 km (27 mi)	MPC · JPL
2357 Phereclos	1981 AC	Phereclos	January 1, 1981	Anderson Mesa	E. Bowell	L5	95 km (59 mi)	MPC · JPL
2358 Bahner	1929 RE	Bahner	September 2, 1929	Heidelberg	K. Reinmuth	EOS	19 km (12 mi)	MPC · JPL
2359 Debehogne	1931 TV	Debehogne	October 5, 1931	Heidelberg	K. Reinmuth	·	6.1 km (3.8 mi)	MPC · JPL
2360 Volgo-Don	1975 VD_{3}	Volgo-Don	November 2, 1975	Nauchnij	T. M. Smirnova	·	9.7 km (6.0 mi)	MPC · JPL
2361 Gogol	1976 GQ_{1}	Gogol	April 1, 1976	Nauchnij	N. S. Chernykh	THM	22 km (14 mi)	MPC · JPL
2362 Mark Twain	1976 SH_{2}	Mark Twain	September 24, 1976	Nauchnij	N. S. Chernykh	·	4.3 km (2.7 mi)	MPC · JPL
2363 Cebriones	1977 TJ_{3}	Cebriones	October 4, 1977	Nanking	Purple Mountain	L5	96 km (60 mi)	MPC · JPL
2364 Seillier	1978 GD	Seillier	April 14, 1978	La Silla	H. Debehogne	·	20 km (12 mi)	MPC · JPL
2365 Interkosmos	1980 YQ	Interkosmos	December 30, 1980	Kleť	Z. Vávrová	(5)	15 km (9.3 mi)	MPC · JPL
2366 Aaryn	1981 AC_{1}	Aaryn	January 10, 1981	Anderson Mesa	N. G. Thomas	·	4.5 km (2.8 mi)	MPC · JPL
2367 Praha	1981 AK_{1}	Praha	January 8, 1981	Kleť	A. Mrkos	·	5.0 km (3.1 mi)	MPC · JPL
2368 Beltrovata	1977 RA	Beltrovata	September 4, 1977	Zimmerwald	P. Wild	AMO +1 km (0.62 mi)	2.3 km (1.4 mi)	MPC · JPL
2369 Chekhov	1976 GC_{8}	Chekhov	April 4, 1976	Nauchnij	N. S. Chernykh	·	10 km (6.2 mi)	MPC · JPL
2370 van Altena	1965 LA	van Altena	June 10, 1965	El Leoncito	A. R. Klemola	·	15 km (9.3 mi)	MPC · JPL
2371 Dimitrov	1975 VR_{3}	Dimitrov	November 2, 1975	Nauchnij	T. M. Smirnova	·	7.5 km (4.7 mi)	MPC · JPL
2372 Proskurin	1977 RA_{8}	Proskurin	September 13, 1977	Nauchnij	N. S. Chernykh	THM	22 km (14 mi)	MPC · JPL
2373 Immo	1929 PC	Immo	August 4, 1929	Heidelberg	M. F. Wolf	GEF	8.7 km (5.4 mi)	MPC · JPL
2374 Vladvysotskij	1974 QE_{1}	Vladvysotskij	August 22, 1974	Nauchnij	L. V. Zhuravleva	·	26 km (16 mi)	MPC · JPL
2375 Radek	1975 AA	Radek	January 8, 1975	Hamburg-Bergedorf	L. Kohoutek	·	33 km (21 mi)	MPC · JPL
2376 Martynov	1977 QG_{3}	Martynov	August 22, 1977	Nauchnij	N. S. Chernykh	·	42 km (26 mi)	MPC · JPL
2377 Shcheglov	1978 QT_{1}	Shcheglov	August 31, 1978	Nauchnij	N. S. Chernykh	KOR	10 km (6.2 mi)	MPC · JPL
2378 Pannekoek	1935 CY	Pannekoek	February 13, 1935	Johannesburg	H. van Gent	·	40 km (25 mi)	MPC · JPL
2379 Heiskanen	1941 ST	Heiskanen	September 21, 1941	Turku	Y. Väisälä	·	33 km (21 mi)	MPC · JPL
2380 Heilongjiang	1965 SN	Heilongjiang	September 18, 1965	Nanking	Purple Mountain	·	6.5 km (4.0 mi)	MPC · JPL
2381 Landi	1976 AF	Landi	January 3, 1976	El Leoncito	Félix Aguilar Observatory	EUN	13 km (8.1 mi)	MPC · JPL
2382 Nonie	1977 GA	Nonie	April 13, 1977	Bickley	Perth Observatory	PAL	17 km (11 mi)	MPC · JPL
2383 Bradley	1981 GN	Bradley	April 5, 1981	Anderson Mesa	E. Bowell	·	5.8 km (3.6 mi)	MPC · JPL
2384 Schulhof	1943 EC_{1}	Schulhof	March 2, 1943	Nice	M. Laugier	EUN	11 km (6.8 mi)	MPC · JPL
2385 Mustel	1969 VW	Mustel	November 11, 1969	Nauchnij	L. I. Chernykh	·	5.9 km (3.7 mi)	MPC · JPL
2386 Nikonov	1974 SN_{1}	Nikonov	September 19, 1974	Nauchnij	L. I. Chernykh	GEF	12 km (7.5 mi)	MPC · JPL
2387 Xi'an	1975 FX	Xi'an	March 17, 1975	Nanking	Purple Mountain	EOS	21 km (13 mi)	MPC · JPL
2388 Gaze	1977 EA_{2}	Gaze	March 13, 1977	Nauchnij	N. S. Chernykh	·	6.5 km (4.0 mi)	MPC · JPL
2389 Dibaj	1977 QC_{1}	Dibaj	August 19, 1977	Nauchnij	N. S. Chernykh	slow	5.8 km (3.6 mi)	MPC · JPL
2390 Nežárka	1980 PA_{1}	Nežárka	August 14, 1980	Kleť	Z. Vávrová	·	23 km (14 mi)	MPC · JPL
2391 Tomita	1957 AA	Tomita	January 9, 1957	Heidelberg	K. Reinmuth	NYS	18 km (11 mi)	MPC · JPL
2392 Jonathan Murray	1979 MN_{1}	Jonathan Murray	June 25, 1979	Siding Spring	E. F. Helin, S. J. Bus	·	10 km (6.2 mi)	MPC · JPL
2393 Suzuki	1955 WB	Suzuki	November 17, 1955	Nice	M. Laugier	·	48 km (30 mi)	MPC · JPL
2394 Nadeev	1973 SZ_{2}	Nadeev	September 22, 1973	Nauchnij	N. S. Chernykh	·	23 km (14 mi)	MPC · JPL
2395 Aho	1977 FA	Aho	March 17, 1977	Harvard Observatory	Harvard Observatory	·	20 km (12 mi)	MPC · JPL
2396 Kochi	1981 CB	Kochi	February 9, 1981	Geisei	T. Seki	·	10 km (6.2 mi)	MPC · JPL
2397 Lappajärvi	1938 DV	Lappajärvi	February 22, 1938	Turku	Y. Väisälä	·	16 km (9.9 mi)	MPC · JPL
2398 Jilin	1965 UD_{2}	Jilin	October 24, 1965	Nanking	Purple Mountain	·	9.8 km (6.1 mi)	MPC · JPL
2399 Terradas	1971 MA	Terradas	June 17, 1971	El Leoncito	C. U. Cesco	·	5.3 km (3.3 mi)	MPC · JPL
2400 Derevskaya	1972 KJ	Derevskaya	May 17, 1972	Nauchnij	T. M. Smirnova	EOS	14 km (8.7 mi)	MPC · JPL

== 2401–2500 ==
back to top

Designation			Discovery			Properties		Ref
Permanent	Provisional	Named after	Date	Site	Discoverer(s)	Category	Diam.	Ref
2401 Aehlita	1975 VM_{2}	Aehlita	November 2, 1975	Nauchnij	T. M. Smirnova	AGN	9.0 km (5.6 mi)	MPC · JPL
2402 Satpaev	1979 OR_{13}	Satpaev	July 31, 1979	Nauchnij	N. S. Chernykh	·	7.4 km (4.6 mi)	MPC · JPL
2403 Šumava	1979 SQ	Šumava	September 25, 1979	Kleť	A. Mrkos	slow	9.7 km (6.0 mi)	MPC · JPL
2404 Antarctica	1980 TE	Antarctica	October 1, 1980	Kleť	A. Mrkos	THM	23 km (14 mi)	MPC · JPL
2405 Welch	1963 UF	Welch	October 18, 1963	Brooklyn	Indiana University	THM	22 km (14 mi)	MPC · JPL
2406 Orelskaya	1966 QG	Orelskaya	August 20, 1966	Nauchnij	Crimean Astrophysical Observatory	·	5.7 km (3.5 mi)	MPC · JPL
2407 Haug	1973 DH	Haug	February 27, 1973	Hamburg-Bergedorf	L. Kohoutek	·	22 km (14 mi)	MPC · JPL
2408 Astapovich	1978 QK_{1}	Astapovich	August 31, 1978	Nauchnij	N. S. Chernykh	·	31 km (19 mi)	MPC · JPL
2409 Chapman	1979 UG	Chapman	October 17, 1979	Anderson Mesa	E. Bowell	·	8.7 km (5.4 mi)	MPC · JPL
2410 Morrison	1981 AF	Morrison	January 3, 1981	Anderson Mesa	E. Bowell	·	6.4 km (4.0 mi)	MPC · JPL
2411 Zellner	1981 JK	Zellner	May 3, 1981	Anderson Mesa	E. Bowell	·	8.0 km (5.0 mi)	MPC · JPL
2412 Wil	3537 P-L	Wil	October 17, 1960	Palomar	C. J. van Houten, I. van Houten-Groeneveld, T. Gehrels	·	12 km (7.5 mi)	MPC · JPL
2413 van de Hulst	6816 P-L	van de Hulst	September 24, 1960	Palomar	C. J. van Houten, I. van Houten-Groeneveld, T. Gehrels	EOS · slow	21 km (13 mi)	MPC · JPL
2414 Vibeke	1931 UG	Vibeke	October 18, 1931	Heidelberg	K. Reinmuth	URS	32 km (20 mi)	MPC · JPL
2415 Ganesa	1978 UJ	Ganesa	October 28, 1978	Anderson Mesa	H. L. Giclas	·	16 km (9.9 mi)	MPC · JPL
2416 Sharonov	1979 OF_{13}	Sharonov	July 31, 1979	Nauchnij	N. S. Chernykh	EOS	15 km (9.3 mi)	MPC · JPL
2417 McVittie	1964 CD	McVittie	February 15, 1964	Brooklyn	Indiana University	·	18 km (11 mi)	MPC · JPL
2418 Voskovec-Werich	1971 UV	Voskovec-Werich	October 26, 1971	Hamburg-Bergedorf	L. Kohoutek	THM	12 km (7.5 mi)	MPC · JPL
2419 Moldavia	1974 SJ	Moldavia	September 19, 1974	Nauchnij	L. I. Chernykh	V	6.1 km (3.8 mi)	MPC · JPL
2420 Čiurlionis	1975 TN	Čiurlionis	October 3, 1975	Nauchnij	N. S. Chernykh	·	8.4 km (5.2 mi)	MPC · JPL
2421 Nininger	1979 UD	Nininger	October 17, 1979	Anderson Mesa	E. Bowell	·	40 km (25 mi)	MPC · JPL
2422 Perovskaya	1968 HK_{1}	Perovskaya	April 28, 1968	Nauchnij	T. M. Smirnova	·	5.6 km (3.5 mi)	MPC · JPL
2423 Ibarruri	1972 NC	Ibarruri	July 14, 1972	Nauchnij	L. V. Zhuravleva	slow	4.9 km (3.0 mi)	MPC · JPL
2424 Tautenburg	1973 UT_{5}	Tautenburg	October 27, 1973	Tautenburg Observatory	F. Börngen, Kirsch, K.	·	6.9 km (4.3 mi)	MPC · JPL
2425 Shenzhen	1975 FW	Shenzhen	March 17, 1975	Nanking	Purple Mountain	EOS	19 km (12 mi)	MPC · JPL
2426 Simonov	1976 KV	Simonov	May 26, 1976	Nauchnij	N. S. Chernykh	·	26 km (16 mi)	MPC · JPL
2427 Kobzar	1976 YQ_{7}	Kobzar	December 20, 1976	Nauchnij	N. S. Chernykh	MRX	8.0 km (5.0 mi)	MPC · JPL
2428 Kamenyar	1977 RZ_{6}	Kamenyar	September 11, 1977	Nauchnij	N. S. Chernykh	VER ·	24 km (15 mi)	MPC · JPL
2429 Schürer	1977 TZ	Schürer	October 12, 1977	Zimmerwald	P. Wild	MAR ·	12 km (7.5 mi)	MPC · JPL
2430 Bruce Helin	1977 VC	Bruce Helin	November 8, 1977	Palomar	E. F. Helin, E. M. Shoemaker	PHO · slow	12 km (7.5 mi)	MPC · JPL
2431 Skovoroda	1978 PF_{3}	Skovoroda	August 8, 1978	Nauchnij	N. S. Chernykh	·	7.7 km (4.8 mi)	MPC · JPL
2432 Soomana	1981 FA	Soomana	March 30, 1981	Anderson Mesa	E. Bowell	·	7.4 km (4.6 mi)	MPC · JPL
2433 Sootiyo	1981 GJ	Sootiyo	April 5, 1981	Anderson Mesa	E. Bowell	·	12 km (7.5 mi)	MPC · JPL
2434 Bateson	1981 KA	Bateson	May 27, 1981	Lake Tekapo	A. C. Gilmore, P. M. Kilmartin	·	17 km (11 mi)	MPC · JPL
2435 Horemheb	4578 P-L	Horemheb	September 24, 1960	Palomar	C. J. van Houten, I. van Houten-Groeneveld, T. Gehrels	·	3.1 km (1.9 mi)	MPC · JPL
2436 Hatshepsut	6066 P-L	Hatshepsut	September 24, 1960	Palomar	C. J. van Houten, I. van Houten-Groeneveld, T. Gehrels	HYG	19 km (12 mi)	MPC · JPL
2437 Amnestia	1942 RZ	Amnestia	September 14, 1942	Turku	M. Väisälä	·	6.7 km (4.2 mi)	MPC · JPL
2438 Oleshko	1975 VO_{2}	Oleshko	November 2, 1975	Nauchnij	T. M. Smirnova	·	7.2 km (4.5 mi)	MPC · JPL
2439 Ulugbek	1977 QX_{2}	Ulugbek	August 21, 1977	Nauchnij	N. S. Chernykh	THM	21 km (13 mi)	MPC · JPL
2440 Educatio	1978 VQ_{4}	Educatio	November 7, 1978	Palomar	E. F. Helin, S. J. Bus	slow	6.6 km (4.1 mi)	MPC · JPL
2441 Hibbs	1979 MN_{2}	Hibbs	June 25, 1979	Siding Spring	E. F. Helin, S. J. Bus	·	9.9 km (6.2 mi)	MPC · JPL
2442 Corbett	1980 TO	Corbett	October 3, 1980	Kleť	Z. Vávrová	·	8.3 km (5.2 mi)	MPC · JPL
2443 Tomeileen	A906 BJ	Tomeileen	January 24, 1906	Heidelberg	M. F. Wolf	EOS	32 km (20 mi)	MPC · JPL
2444 Lederle	1934 CD	Lederle	February 5, 1934	Heidelberg	K. Reinmuth	·	30 km (19 mi)	MPC · JPL
2445 Blazhko	1935 TC	Blazhko	October 3, 1935	Crimea-Simeis	P. F. Shajn	·	9.1 km (5.7 mi)	MPC · JPL
2446 Lunacharsky	1971 TS_{2}	Lunacharsky	October 14, 1971	Nauchnij	L. I. Chernykh	·	13 km (8.1 mi)	MPC · JPL
2447 Kronstadt	1973 QY_{1}	Kronstadt	August 31, 1973	Nauchnij	T. M. Smirnova	·	7.8 km (4.8 mi)	MPC · JPL
2448 Sholokhov	1975 BU	Sholokhov	January 18, 1975	Nauchnij	L. I. Chernykh	·	39 km (24 mi)	MPC · JPL
2449 Kenos	1978 GC	Kenos	April 8, 1978	Cerro Tololo	W. Liller	H · moon	3.7 km (2.3 mi)	MPC · JPL
2450 Ioannisiani	1978 RP	Ioannisiani	September 1, 1978	Nauchnij	N. S. Chernykh	THM	22 km (14 mi)	MPC · JPL
2451 Dollfus	1980 RQ	Dollfus	September 2, 1980	Anderson Mesa	E. Bowell	·	12 km (7.5 mi)	MPC · JPL
2452 Lyot	1981 FE	Lyot	March 30, 1981	Anderson Mesa	E. Bowell	·	12 km (7.5 mi)	MPC · JPL
2453 Wabash	A921 SA	Wabash	September 30, 1921	Heidelberg	K. Reinmuth	EOS ·	19 km (12 mi)	MPC · JPL
2454 Olaus Magnus	1941 SS	Olaus Magnus	September 21, 1941	Turku	Y. Väisälä	(883)	4.9 km (3.0 mi)	MPC · JPL
2455 Somville	1950 TO_{4}	Somville	October 5, 1950	Uccle	S. J. Arend	·	16 km (9.9 mi)	MPC · JPL
2456 Palamedes	1966 BA_{1}	Palamedes	January 30, 1966	Nanking	Purple Mountain	L4	66 km (41 mi)	MPC · JPL
2457 Rublyov	1975 TU_{2}	Rublyov	October 3, 1975	Nauchnij	L. I. Chernykh	·	15 km (9.3 mi)	MPC · JPL
2458 Veniakaverin	1977 RC_{7}	Veniakaverin	September 11, 1977	Nauchnij	N. S. Chernykh	·	23 km (14 mi)	MPC · JPL
2459 Spellmann	1980 LB_{1}	Spellmann	June 11, 1980	Palomar	C. S. Shoemaker	EOS ·	18 km (11 mi)	MPC · JPL
2460 Mitlincoln	1980 TX_{4}	Mitlincoln	October 1, 1980	Socorro	Taff, L. G., Beatty, D.	·	9.3 km (5.8 mi)	MPC · JPL
2461 Clavel	1981 EC_{1}	Clavel	March 5, 1981	La Silla	H. Debehogne, G. de Sanctis	THM	26 km (16 mi)	MPC · JPL
2462 Nehalennia	6578 P-L	Nehalennia	September 24, 1960	Palomar	C. J. van Houten, I. van Houten-Groeneveld, T. Gehrels	NYS	4.7 km (2.9 mi)	MPC · JPL
2463 Sterpin	1934 FF	Sterpin	March 10, 1934	Williams Bay	G. Van Biesbroeck	EUN	11 km (6.8 mi)	MPC · JPL
2464 Nordenskiöld	1939 BF	Nordenskiöld	January 19, 1939	Turku	Y. Väisälä	·	22 km (14 mi)	MPC · JPL
2465 Wilson	1949 PK	Wilson	August 2, 1949	Heidelberg	K. Reinmuth	·	22 km (14 mi)	MPC · JPL
2466 Golson	1959 RJ	Golson	September 7, 1959	Brooklyn	Indiana University	·	24 km (15 mi)	MPC · JPL
2467 Kollontai	1966 PJ	Kollontai	August 14, 1966	Nauchnij	L. I. Chernykh	·	8.1 km (5.0 mi)	MPC · JPL
2468 Repin	1969 TO_{1}	Repin	October 8, 1969	Nauchnij	L. I. Chernykh	·	6.2 km (3.9 mi)	MPC · JPL
2469 Tadjikistan	1970 HA	Tadjikistan	April 27, 1970	Nauchnij	T. M. Smirnova	·	13 km (8.1 mi)	MPC · JPL
2470 Agematsu	1976 UW_{15}	Agematsu	October 22, 1976	Kiso	H. Kosai, K. Furukawa	KOR	11 km (6.8 mi)	MPC · JPL
2471 Ultrajectum	6545 P-L	Ultrajectum	September 24, 1960	Palomar	C. J. van Houten, I. van Houten-Groeneveld, T. Gehrels	EOS	16 km (9.9 mi)	MPC · JPL
2472 Bradman	1973 DG	Bradman	February 27, 1973	Hamburg-Bergedorf	L. Kohoutek	·	3.5 km (2.2 mi)	MPC · JPL
2473 Heyerdahl	1977 RX_{7}	Heyerdahl	September 12, 1977	Nauchnij	N. S. Chernykh	(883)	4.9 km (3.0 mi)	MPC · JPL
2474 Ruby	1979 PB	Ruby	August 14, 1979	Kleť	Z. Vávrová	·	24 km (15 mi)	MPC · JPL
2475 Semenov	1972 TF_{2}	Semenov	October 8, 1972	Nauchnij	L. V. Zhuravleva	EOS	14 km (8.7 mi)	MPC · JPL
2476 Andersen	1976 JF_{2}	Andersen	May 2, 1976	Nauchnij	N. S. Chernykh	EOS	21 km (13 mi)	MPC · JPL
2477 Biryukov	1977 PY_{1}	Biryukov	August 14, 1977	Nauchnij	N. S. Chernykh	·	18 km (11 mi)	MPC · JPL
2478 Tokai	1981 JC	Tokai	May 4, 1981	Tōkai	T. Furuta	moon	9.2 km (5.7 mi)	MPC · JPL
2479 Sodankylä	1942 CB	Sodankylä	February 6, 1942	Turku	Y. Väisälä	·	6.4 km (4.0 mi)	MPC · JPL
2480 Papanov	1976 YS_{1}	Papanov	December 16, 1976	Nauchnij	L. I. Chernykh	·	6.0 km (3.7 mi)	MPC · JPL
2481 Bürgi	1977 UQ	Bürgi	October 18, 1977	Zimmerwald	P. Wild	·	4.7 km (2.9 mi)	MPC · JPL
2482 Perkin	1980 CO	Perkin	February 13, 1980	Harvard Observatory	Harvard Observatory	KOR	11 km (6.8 mi)	MPC · JPL
2483 Guinevere	1928 QB	Guinevere	August 17, 1928	Heidelberg	M. F. Wolf	T_{j} (2.98) · 3:2	36 km (22 mi)	MPC · JPL
2484 Parenago	1928 TK	Parenago	October 7, 1928	Crimea-Simeis	G. N. Neujmin	·	6.3 km (3.9 mi)	MPC · JPL
2485 Scheffler	1932 BH	Scheffler	January 29, 1932	Heidelberg	K. Reinmuth	·	14 km (8.7 mi)	MPC · JPL
2486 Metsähovi	1939 FY	Metsähovi	March 22, 1939	Turku	Y. Väisälä	moon	7.9 km (4.9 mi)	MPC · JPL
2487 Juhani	1940 RL	Juhani	September 8, 1940	Turku	H. Alikoski	NYS · slow	9.5 km (5.9 mi)	MPC · JPL
2488 Bryan	1952 UT	Bryan	October 23, 1952	Brooklyn	Indiana University	·	4.4 km (2.7 mi)	MPC · JPL
2489 Suvorov	1975 NY	Suvorov	July 11, 1975	Nauchnij	L. I. Chernykh	THM	21 km (13 mi)	MPC · JPL
2490 Bussolini	1976 AG	Bussolini	January 3, 1976	El Leoncito	Félix Aguilar Observatory	EUN	12 km (7.5 mi)	MPC · JPL
2491 Tvashtri	1977 CB	Tvashtri	February 15, 1977	Palomar	W. Sebok	H · moon	3.3 km (2.1 mi)	MPC · JPL
2492 Kutuzov	1977 NT	Kutuzov	July 14, 1977	Nauchnij	N. S. Chernykh	THM	28 km (17 mi)	MPC · JPL
2493 Elmer	1978 XC	Elmer	December 1, 1978	Harvard Observatory	Harvard Observatory	GEF	7.4 km (4.6 mi)	MPC · JPL
2494 Inge	1981 LF	Inge	June 4, 1981	Anderson Mesa	E. Bowell	·	47 km (29 mi)	MPC · JPL
2495 Noviomagum	7071 P-L	Noviomagum	October 17, 1960	Palomar	C. J. van Houten, I. van Houten-Groeneveld, T. Gehrels	H	1.7 km (1.1 mi)	MPC · JPL
2496 Fernandus	1953 TC_{1}	Fernandus	October 8, 1953	Brooklyn	Indiana University	·	5.7 km (3.5 mi)	MPC · JPL
2497 Kulikovskij	1977 PZ_{1}	Kulikovskij	August 14, 1977	Nauchnij	N. S. Chernykh	·	7.2 km (4.5 mi)	MPC · JPL
2498 Tsesevich	1977 QM_{3}	Tsesevich	August 23, 1977	Nauchnij	N. S. Chernykh	KOR	11 km (6.8 mi)	MPC · JPL
2499 Brunk	1978 VJ_{7}	Brunk	November 7, 1978	Palomar	E. F. Helin, S. J. Bus	THM	16 km (9.9 mi)	MPC · JPL
2500 Alascattalo	1926 GC	Alascattalo	April 2, 1926	Heidelberg	K. Reinmuth	moon	7.5 km (4.7 mi)	MPC · JPL

== 2501–2600 ==
back to top

Designation			Discovery			Properties		Ref
Permanent	Provisional	Named after	Date	Site	Discoverer(s)	Category	Diam.	Ref
2501 Lohja	1942 GD	Lohja	April 14, 1942	Turku	L. Oterma	·	10 km (6.2 mi)	MPC · JPL
2502 Nummela	1943 EO	Nummela	March 3, 1943	Turku	Y. Väisälä	·	19 km (12 mi)	MPC · JPL
2503 Liaoning	1965 UB_{1}	Liaoning	October 16, 1965	Nanking	Purple Mountain	·	6.7 km (4.2 mi)	MPC · JPL
2504 Gaviola	1967 JO	Gaviola	May 6, 1967	El Leoncito	C. U. Cesco, A. R. Klemola	·	11 km (6.8 mi)	MPC · JPL
2505 Hebei	1975 UJ	Hebei	October 31, 1975	Nanking	Purple Mountain	THM	22 km (14 mi)	MPC · JPL
2506 Pirogov	1976 QG_{1}	Pirogov	August 26, 1976	Nauchnij	N. S. Chernykh	KOR	11 km (6.8 mi)	MPC · JPL
2507 Bobone	1976 WB_{1}	Bobone	November 18, 1976	El Leoncito	Félix Aguilar Observatory	·	16 km (9.9 mi)	MPC · JPL
2508 Alupka	1977 ET_{1}	Alupka	March 13, 1977	Nauchnij	N. S. Chernykh	V	4.9 km (3.0 mi)	MPC · JPL
2509 Chukotka	1977 NG	Chukotka	July 14, 1977	Nauchnij	N. S. Chernykh	NYS	17 km (11 mi)	MPC · JPL
2510 Shandong	1979 TH	Shandong	October 10, 1979	Nanking	Purple Mountain	·	9.1 km (5.7 mi)	MPC · JPL
2511 Patterson	1980 LM	Patterson	June 11, 1980	Palomar	C. S. Shoemaker	·	7.8 km (4.8 mi)	MPC · JPL
2512 Tavastia	1940 GG	Tavastia	April 3, 1940	Turku	Y. Väisälä	(883)	7.5 km (4.7 mi)	MPC · JPL
2513 Baetslé	1950 SH	Baetslé	September 19, 1950	Uccle	S. J. Arend	·	5.1 km (3.2 mi)	MPC · JPL
2514 Taiyuan	1964 TA_{1}	Taiyuan	October 8, 1964	Nanking	Purple Mountain	·	8.8 km (5.5 mi)	MPC · JPL
2515 Gansu	1964 TX_{1}	Gansu	October 9, 1964	Nanking	Purple Mountain	·	20 km (12 mi)	MPC · JPL
2516 Roman	1964 VY	Roman	November 6, 1964	Brooklyn	Indiana University	moon	4.4 km (2.7 mi)	MPC · JPL
2517 Orma	1968 SB	Orma	September 28, 1968	Zimmerwald	P. Wild	THM	20 km (12 mi)	MPC · JPL
2518 Rutllant	1974 FG	Rutllant	March 22, 1974	Cerro El Roble	C. Torres	·	3.2 km (2.0 mi)	MPC · JPL
2519 Annagerman	1975 VD_{2}	Annagerman	November 2, 1975	Nauchnij	T. M. Smirnova	THM	21 km (13 mi)	MPC · JPL
2520 Novorossijsk	1976 QF_{1}	Novorossijsk	August 26, 1976	Nauchnij	N. S. Chernykh	·	30 km (19 mi)	MPC · JPL
2521 Heidi	1979 DK	Heidi	February 28, 1979	Zimmerwald	P. Wild	GEF	10 km (6.2 mi)	MPC · JPL
2522 Triglav	1980 PP	Triglav	August 6, 1980	Kleť	Z. Vávrová	EOS	17 km (11 mi)	MPC · JPL
2523 Ryba	1980 PV	Ryba	August 6, 1980	Kleť	Z. Vávrová	EOS	17 km (11 mi)	MPC · JPL
2524 Budovicium	1981 QB_{1}	Budovicium	August 28, 1981	Kleť	Z. Vávrová	THM	33 km (21 mi)	MPC · JPL
2525 O'Steen	1981 VG	O'Steen	November 2, 1981	Anderson Mesa	B. A. Skiff	THM ·	30 km (19 mi)	MPC · JPL
2526 Alisary	1979 KX	Alisary	May 19, 1979	La Silla	R. M. West	·	15 km (9.3 mi)	MPC · JPL
2527 Gregory	1981 RE	Gregory	September 3, 1981	Anderson Mesa	N. G. Thomas	·	13 km (8.1 mi)	MPC · JPL
2528 Mohler	1953 TF_{1}	Mohler	October 8, 1953	Brooklyn	Indiana University	THM	19 km (12 mi)	MPC · JPL
2529 Rockwell Kent	1977 QL_{2}	Rockwell Kent	August 21, 1977	Nauchnij	N. S. Chernykh	·	8.2 km (5.1 mi)	MPC · JPL
2530 Shipka	1978 NC_{3}	Shipka	July 9, 1978	Nauchnij	L. I. Chernykh	EOS · fast	12 km (7.5 mi)	MPC · JPL
2531 Cambridge	1980 LD	Cambridge	June 11, 1980	Anderson Mesa	E. Bowell	EOS	22 km (14 mi)	MPC · JPL
2532 Sutton	1980 TU_{5}	Sutton	October 9, 1980	Palomar	C. S. Shoemaker	·	7.0 km (4.3 mi)	MPC · JPL
2533 Fechtig	A905 VA	Fechtig	November 3, 1905	Heidelberg	M. F. Wolf	THM	21 km (13 mi)	MPC · JPL
2534 Houzeau	1931 VD	Houzeau	November 2, 1931	Uccle	E. Delporte	THM	31 km (19 mi)	MPC · JPL
2535 Hämeenlinna	1939 DH	Hämeenlinna	February 17, 1939	Turku	Y. Väisälä	moon	7.1 km (4.4 mi)	MPC · JPL
2536 Kozyrev	1939 PJ	Kozyrev	August 15, 1939	Crimea-Simeis	G. N. Neujmin	·	8.0 km (5.0 mi)	MPC · JPL
2537 Gilmore	1951 RL	Gilmore	September 4, 1951	Heidelberg	K. Reinmuth	EUN	7.2 km (4.5 mi)	MPC · JPL
2538 Vanderlinden	1954 UD	Vanderlinden	October 30, 1954	Uccle	S. J. Arend	·	5.5 km (3.4 mi)	MPC · JPL
2539 Ningxia	1964 TS_{2}	Ningxia	October 8, 1964	Nanking	Purple Mountain	·	3.6 km (2.2 mi)	MPC · JPL
2540 Blok	1971 TH_{2}	Blok	October 13, 1971	Nauchnij	L. I. Chernykh	·	5.7 km (3.5 mi)	MPC · JPL
2541 Edebono	1973 DE	Edebono	February 27, 1973	Hamburg-Bergedorf	L. Kohoutek	KOR	10 km (6.2 mi)	MPC · JPL
2542 Calpurnia	1980 CF	Calpurnia	February 11, 1980	Anderson Mesa	E. Bowell	·	21 km (13 mi)	MPC · JPL
2543 Machado	1980 LJ	Machado	June 1, 1980	La Silla	H. Debehogne	·	14 km (8.7 mi)	MPC · JPL
2544 Gubarev	1980 PS	Gubarev	August 6, 1980	Kleť	Z. Vávrová	PHO	9.3 km (5.8 mi)	MPC · JPL
2545 Verbiest	1933 BB	Verbiest	January 26, 1933	Uccle	E. Delporte	·	6.9 km (4.3 mi)	MPC · JPL
2546 Libitina	1950 FC	Libitina	March 23, 1950	Johannesburg	E. L. Johnson	slow	14 km (8.7 mi)	MPC · JPL
2547 Hubei	1964 TC_{2}	Hubei	October 9, 1964	Nanking	Purple Mountain	V	4.1 km (2.5 mi)	MPC · JPL
2548 Leloir	1975 DA	Leloir	February 16, 1975	El Leoncito	Félix Aguilar Observatory	·	10 km (6.2 mi)	MPC · JPL
2549 Baker	1976 UB	Baker	October 23, 1976	Harvard Observatory	Harvard Observatory	THM	17 km (11 mi)	MPC · JPL
2550 Houssay	1976 UP_{20}	Houssay	October 21, 1976	El Leoncito	Félix Aguilar Observatory	·	22 km (14 mi)	MPC · JPL
2551 Decabrina	1976 YX_{1}	Decabrina	December 16, 1976	Nauchnij	L. I. Chernykh	THM	16 km (9.9 mi)	MPC · JPL
2552 Remek	1978 SP	Remek	September 24, 1978	Kleť	A. Mrkos	·	4.5 km (2.8 mi)	MPC · JPL
2553 Viljev	1979 FS_{2}	Viljev	March 29, 1979	Nauchnij	N. S. Chernykh	·	14 km (8.7 mi)	MPC · JPL
2554 Skiff	1980 OB	Skiff	July 17, 1980	Anderson Mesa	E. Bowell	(2076) · slow	6.0 km (3.7 mi)	MPC · JPL
2555 Thomas	1980 OC	Thomas	July 17, 1980	Anderson Mesa	E. Bowell	KOR	10 km (6.2 mi)	MPC · JPL
2556 Louise	1981 CS	Louise	February 8, 1981	Anderson Mesa	N. G. Thomas	·	6.2 km (3.9 mi)	MPC · JPL
2557 Putnam	1981 SL_{1}	Putnam	September 26, 1981	Anderson Mesa	B. A. Skiff, N. G. Thomas	·	7.5 km (4.7 mi)	MPC · JPL
2558 Viv	1981 SP_{1}	Viv	September 26, 1981	Anderson Mesa	N. G. Thomas	·	5.0 km (3.1 mi)	MPC · JPL
2559 Svoboda	1981 UH	Svoboda	October 23, 1981	Kleť	A. Mrkos	·	21 km (13 mi)	MPC · JPL
2560 Siegma	1932 CW	Siegma	February 14, 1932	Heidelberg	K. Reinmuth	PAD	18 km (11 mi)	MPC · JPL
2561 Margolin	1969 TK_{2}	Margolin	October 8, 1969	Nauchnij	L. I. Chernykh	NYS	12 km (7.5 mi)	MPC · JPL
2562 Chaliapin	1973 FF_{1}	Chaliapin	March 27, 1973	Nauchnij	L. V. Zhuravleva	EOS	16 km (9.9 mi)	MPC · JPL
2563 Boyarchuk	1977 FZ	Boyarchuk	March 22, 1977	Nauchnij	N. S. Chernykh	THM	24 km (15 mi)	MPC · JPL
2564 Kayala	1977 QX	Kayala	August 19, 1977	Nauchnij	N. S. Chernykh	·	6.2 km (3.9 mi)	MPC · JPL
2565 Grögler	1977 TB_{1}	Grögler	October 12, 1977	Zimmerwald	P. Wild	NYS · fast	5.4 km (3.4 mi)	MPC · JPL
2566 Kirghizia	1979 FR_{2}	Kirghizia	March 29, 1979	Nauchnij	N. S. Chernykh	·	7.8 km (4.8 mi)	MPC · JPL
2567 Elba	1979 KA	Elba	May 19, 1979	La Silla	Pizarro, O., G. Pizarro	·	16 km (9.9 mi)	MPC · JPL
2568 Maksutov	1980 GH	Maksutov	April 13, 1980	Kleť	Z. Vávrová	·	4.6 km (2.9 mi)	MPC · JPL
2569 Madeline	1980 MA	Madeline	June 18, 1980	Anderson Mesa	E. Bowell	·	26 km (16 mi)	MPC · JPL
2570 Porphyro	1980 PG	Porphyro	August 6, 1980	Anderson Mesa	E. Bowell	·	25 km (16 mi)	MPC · JPL
2571 Geisei	1981 UC	Geisei	October 23, 1981	Geisei	T. Seki	·	6.6 km (4.1 mi)	MPC · JPL
2572 Annschnell	1950 DL	Annschnell	February 17, 1950	Heidelberg	K. Reinmuth	·	3.4 km (2.1 mi)	MPC · JPL
2573 Hannu Olavi	1953 EN	Hannu Olavi	March 10, 1953	Turku	H. Alikoski	·	20 km (12 mi)	MPC · JPL
2574 Ladoga	1968 UP	Ladoga	October 22, 1968	Nauchnij	T. M. Smirnova	KOR	13 km (8.1 mi)	MPC · JPL
2575 Bulgaria	1970 PL	Bulgaria	August 4, 1970	Nauchnij	T. M. Smirnova	·	6.4 km (4.0 mi)	MPC · JPL
2576 Yesenin	1974 QL	Yesenin	August 17, 1974	Nauchnij	L. V. Zhuravleva	slow	28 km (17 mi)	MPC · JPL
2577 Litva	1975 EE_{3}	Litva	March 12, 1975	Nauchnij	N. S. Chernykh	H · moon	5.7 km (3.5 mi)	MPC · JPL
2578 Saint-Exupéry	1975 VW_{3}	Saint-Exupéry	November 2, 1975	Nauchnij	T. M. Smirnova	EOS	17 km (11 mi)	MPC · JPL
2579 Spartacus	1977 PA_{2}	Spartacus	August 14, 1977	Nauchnij	N. S. Chernykh	·	4.6 km (2.9 mi)	MPC · JPL
2580 Smilevskia	1977 QP_{4}	Smilevskia	August 18, 1977	Nauchnij	N. S. Chernykh	slow	7.2 km (4.5 mi)	MPC · JPL
2581 Radegast	1980 VX	Radegast	November 11, 1980	Kleť	Z. Vávrová	·	6.7 km (4.2 mi)	MPC · JPL
2582 Harimaya-Bashi	1981 SA	Harimaya-Bashi	September 26, 1981	Geisei	T. Seki	·	29 km (18 mi)	MPC · JPL
2583 Fatyanov	1975 XA_{3}	Fatyanov	December 3, 1975	Nauchnij	T. M. Smirnova	·	5.7 km (3.5 mi)	MPC · JPL
2584 Turkmenia	1979 FG_{2}	Turkmenia	March 23, 1979	Nauchnij	N. S. Chernykh	·	6.2 km (3.9 mi)	MPC · JPL
2585 Irpedina	1979 OJ_{15}	Irpedina	July 21, 1979	Nauchnij	N. S. Chernykh	slow	6.0 km (3.7 mi)	MPC · JPL
2586 Matson	1980 LO	Matson	June 11, 1980	Palomar	C. S. Shoemaker	·	6.5 km (4.0 mi)	MPC · JPL
2587 Gardner	1980 OH	Gardner	July 17, 1980	Anderson Mesa	E. Bowell	THM ·	21 km (13 mi)	MPC · JPL
2588 Flavia	1981 VQ	Flavia	November 2, 1981	Anderson Mesa	B. A. Skiff	·	6.2 km (3.9 mi)	MPC · JPL
2589 Daniel	1979 QU_{2}	Daniel	August 22, 1979	La Silla	C.-I. Lagerkvist	KOR	9.4 km (5.8 mi)	MPC · JPL
2590 Mourão	1980 KJ	Mourão	May 22, 1980	La Silla	H. Debehogne	V	7.9 km (4.9 mi)	MPC · JPL
2591 Dworetsky	1949 PS	Dworetsky	August 2, 1949	Heidelberg	K. Reinmuth	KOR	13 km (8.1 mi)	MPC · JPL
2592 Hunan	1966 BW	Hunan	January 30, 1966	Nanking	Purple Mountain	THM	19 km (12 mi)	MPC · JPL
2593 Buryatia	1976 GB_{8}	Buryatia	April 2, 1976	Nauchnij	N. S. Chernykh	·	3.9 km (2.4 mi)	MPC · JPL
2594 Acamas	1978 TB	Acamas	October 4, 1978	Palomar	C. T. Kowal	L5	26 km (16 mi)	MPC · JPL
2595 Gudiachvili	1979 KL	Gudiachvili	May 19, 1979	La Silla	R. M. West	GEF	14 km (8.7 mi)	MPC · JPL
2596 Vainu Bappu	1979 KN	Vainu Bappu	May 19, 1979	La Silla	R. M. West	·	11 km (6.8 mi)	MPC · JPL
2597 Arthur	1980 PN	Arthur	August 8, 1980	Anderson Mesa	E. Bowell	·	10 km (6.2 mi)	MPC · JPL
2598 Merlin	1980 RY	Merlin	September 7, 1980	Anderson Mesa	E. Bowell	DOR	16 km (9.9 mi)	MPC · JPL
2599 Veselí	1980 SO	Veselí	September 29, 1980	Kleť	Z. Vávrová	·	13 km (8.1 mi)	MPC · JPL
2600 Lumme	1980 VP	Lumme	November 9, 1980	Anderson Mesa	E. Bowell	EOS	15 km (9.3 mi)	MPC · JPL

== 2601–2700 ==
back to top

Designation			Discovery			Properties		Ref
Permanent	Provisional	Named after	Date	Site	Discoverer(s)	Category	Diam.	Ref
2601 Bologna	1980 XA	Bologna	December 8, 1980	Bologna	San Vittore	·	12 km (7.5 mi)	MPC · JPL
2602 Moore	1982 BR	Moore	January 24, 1982	Anderson Mesa	E. Bowell	moon	10 km (6.2 mi)	MPC · JPL
2603 Taylor	1982 BW_{1}	Taylor	January 30, 1982	Anderson Mesa	E. Bowell	·	18 km (11 mi)	MPC · JPL
2604 Marshak	1972 LD_{1}	Marshak	June 13, 1972	Nauchnij	T. M. Smirnova	PHO	15 km (9.3 mi)	MPC · JPL
2605 Sahade	1974 QA	Sahade	August 16, 1974	El Leoncito	Félix Aguilar Observatory	EOS	12 km (7.5 mi)	MPC · JPL
2606 Odessa	1976 GX_{2}	Odessa	April 1, 1976	Nauchnij	N. S. Chernykh	·	16 km (9.9 mi)	MPC · JPL
2607 Yakutia	1977 NR	Yakutia	July 14, 1977	Nauchnij	N. S. Chernykh	NYS · moon	4.7 km (2.9 mi)	MPC · JPL
2608 Seneca	1978 DA	Seneca	February 17, 1978	La Silla	H.-E. Schuster	AMO +1 km (0.62 mi) · (887)	900 m (3,000 ft)	MPC · JPL
2609 Kiril-Metodi	1978 PB_{4}	Kiril-Metodi	August 9, 1978	Nauchnij	N. S. Chernykh, L. I. Chernykh	·	5.6 km (3.5 mi)	MPC · JPL
2610 Tuva	1978 RO_{1}	Tuva	September 5, 1978	Nauchnij	N. S. Chernykh	·	5.6 km (3.5 mi)	MPC · JPL
2611 Boyce	1978 VQ_{5}	Boyce	November 7, 1978	Palomar	E. F. Helin, S. J. Bus	·	20 km (12 mi)	MPC · JPL
2612 Kathryn	1979 DE	Kathryn	February 28, 1979	Anderson Mesa	N. G. Thomas	·	25 km (16 mi)	MPC · JPL
2613 Plzeň	1979 QE	Plzeň	August 30, 1979	Kleť	L. Brožek	·	28 km (17 mi)	MPC · JPL
2614 Torrence	1980 LP	Torrence	June 11, 1980	Palomar	C. S. Shoemaker	·	8.0 km (5.0 mi)	MPC · JPL
2615 Saito	1951 RJ	Saito	September 4, 1951	Heidelberg	K. Reinmuth	HYG	16 km (9.9 mi)	MPC · JPL
2616 Lesya	1970 QV	Lesya	August 28, 1970	Nauchnij	T. M. Smirnova	·	8.5 km (5.3 mi)	MPC · JPL
2617 Jiangxi	1975 WO_{1}	Jiangxi	November 26, 1975	Nanking	Purple Mountain	·	49 km (30 mi)	MPC · JPL
2618 Coonabarabran	1979 MX_{2}	Coonabarabran	June 25, 1979	Siding Spring	E. F. Helin, S. J. Bus	EOS	12 km (7.5 mi)	MPC · JPL
2619 Skalnaté Pleso	1979 MZ_{3}	Skalnaté Pleso	June 25, 1979	Siding Spring	E. F. Helin, S. J. Bus	·	10 km (6.2 mi)	MPC · JPL
2620 Santana	1980 TN	Santana	October 3, 1980	Kleť	Z. Vávrová	KOR	9.3 km (5.8 mi)	MPC · JPL
2621 Goto	1981 CA	Goto	February 9, 1981	Geisei	T. Seki	·	45 km (28 mi)	MPC · JPL
2622 Bolzano	1981 CM	Bolzano	February 9, 1981	Kleť	L. Brožek	EOS	14 km (8.7 mi)	MPC · JPL
2623 Zech	A919 SA	Zech	September 22, 1919	Heidelberg	K. Reinmuth	moon	5.6 km (3.5 mi)	MPC · JPL
2624 Samitchell	1962 RE	Samitchell	September 7, 1962	Brooklyn	Indiana University	3:2	40 km (25 mi)	MPC · JPL
2625 Jack London	1976 JQ_{2}	Jack London	May 2, 1976	Nauchnij	N. S. Chernykh	·	5.7 km (3.5 mi)	MPC · JPL
2626 Belnika	1978 PP_{2}	Belnika	August 8, 1978	Nauchnij	N. S. Chernykh	KOR	12 km (7.5 mi)	MPC · JPL
2627 Churyumov	1978 PP_{3}	Churyumov	August 8, 1978	Nauchnij	N. S. Chernykh	THM	20 km (12 mi)	MPC · JPL
2628 Kopal	1979 MS_{8}	Kopal	June 25, 1979	Siding Spring	E. F. Helin, S. J. Bus	·	10 km (6.2 mi)	MPC · JPL
2629 Rudra	1980 RB_{1}	Rudra	September 13, 1980	Palomar	C. T. Kowal	slow	4.7 km (2.9 mi)	MPC · JPL
2630 Hermod	1980 TF_{3}	Hermod	October 14, 1980	Haute-Provence	Haute Provence	·	25 km (16 mi)	MPC · JPL
2631 Zhejiang	1980 TY_{5}	Zhejiang	October 7, 1980	Nanking	Purple Mountain	GEF	11 km (6.8 mi)	MPC · JPL
2632 Guizhou	1980 VJ_{1}	Guizhou	November 6, 1980	Nanking	Purple Mountain	EOS	32 km (20 mi)	MPC · JPL
2633 Bishop	1981 WR_{1}	Bishop	November 24, 1981	Anderson Mesa	E. Bowell	·	7.0 km (4.3 mi)	MPC · JPL
2634 James Bradley	1982 DL	James Bradley	February 21, 1982	Anderson Mesa	E. Bowell	CYB	34 km (21 mi)	MPC · JPL
2635 Huggins	1982 DS	Huggins	February 21, 1982	Anderson Mesa	E. Bowell	moon	8.5 km (5.3 mi)	MPC · JPL
2636 Lassell	1982 DZ	Lassell	February 20, 1982	Anderson Mesa	E. Bowell	·	14 km (8.7 mi)	MPC · JPL
2637 Bobrovnikoff	A919 SB	Bobrovnikoff	September 22, 1919	Heidelberg	K. Reinmuth	·	6.2 km (3.9 mi)	MPC · JPL
2638 Gadolin	1939 SG	Gadolin	September 19, 1939	Turku	Y. Väisälä	MAR	12 km (7.5 mi)	MPC · JPL
2639 Planman	1940 GN	Planman	April 9, 1940	Turku	Y. Väisälä	·	9.5 km (5.9 mi)	MPC · JPL
2640 Hällström	1941 FN	Hällström	March 18, 1941	Turku	L. Oterma	·	10 km (6.2 mi)	MPC · JPL
2641 Lipschutz	1949 GJ	Lipschutz	April 4, 1949	Brooklyn	Indiana University	·	8.1 km (5.0 mi)	MPC · JPL
2642 Vésale	1961 RA	Vésale	September 14, 1961	Uccle	S. J. Arend	PHO ·	7.4 km (4.6 mi)	MPC · JPL
2643 Bernhard	1973 SD	Bernhard	September 19, 1973	Palomar	T. Gehrels	PHO	4.0 km (2.5 mi)	MPC · JPL
2644 Victor Jara	1973 SO_{2}	Victor Jara	September 22, 1973	Nauchnij	N. S. Chernykh	·	5.9 km (3.7 mi)	MPC · JPL
2645 Daphne Plane	1976 QD	Daphne Plane	August 30, 1976	Palomar	E. F. Helin	PHO	16 km (9.9 mi)	MPC · JPL
2646 Abetti	1977 EC_{1}	Abetti	March 13, 1977	Nauchnij	N. S. Chernykh	EOS	17 km (11 mi)	MPC · JPL
2647 Sova	1980 SP	Sova	September 29, 1980	Kleť	Z. Vávrová	·	7.6 km (4.7 mi)	MPC · JPL
2648 Owa	1980 VJ	Owa	November 8, 1980	Anderson Mesa	E. Bowell	·	5.9 km (3.7 mi)	MPC · JPL
2649 Oongaq	1980 WA	Oongaq	November 29, 1980	Anderson Mesa	E. Bowell	EUN	11 km (6.8 mi)	MPC · JPL
2650 Elinor	1931 EG	Elinor	March 14, 1931	Heidelberg	M. F. Wolf	·	13 km (8.1 mi)	MPC · JPL
2651 Karen	1949 QD	Karen	August 28, 1949	Johannesburg	E. L. Johnson	·	24 km (15 mi)	MPC · JPL
2652 Yabuuti	1953 GM	Yabuuti	April 7, 1953	Heidelberg	K. Reinmuth	·	7.2 km (4.5 mi)	MPC · JPL
2653 Principia	1964 VP	Principia	November 4, 1964	Brooklyn	Indiana University	·	9.9 km (6.2 mi)	MPC · JPL
2654 Ristenpart	1968 OG	Ristenpart	July 18, 1968	Cerro El Roble	C. Torres, Cofre, S.	·	16 km (9.9 mi)	MPC · JPL
2655 Guangxi	1974 XX	Guangxi	December 14, 1974	Nanking	Purple Mountain	·	30 km (19 mi)	MPC · JPL
2656 Evenkia	1979 HD_{5}	Evenkia	April 25, 1979	Nauchnij	N. S. Chernykh	·	6.1 km (3.8 mi)	MPC · JPL
2657 Bashkiria	1979 SB_{7}	Bashkiria	September 23, 1979	Nauchnij	N. S. Chernykh	THM	21 km (13 mi)	MPC · JPL
2658 Gingerich	1980 CK	Gingerich	February 13, 1980	Harvard Observatory	Harvard Observatory	·	12 km (7.5 mi)	MPC · JPL
2659 Millis	1981 JX	Millis	May 5, 1981	Anderson Mesa	E. Bowell	THM	28 km (17 mi)	MPC · JPL
2660 Wasserman	1982 FG	Wasserman	March 21, 1982	Anderson Mesa	E. Bowell	EUN · slow	9.2 km (5.7 mi)	MPC · JPL
2661 Bydžovský	1982 FC_{1}	Bydžovský	March 23, 1982	Kleť	Z. Vávrová	EOS	20 km (12 mi)	MPC · JPL
2662 Kandinsky	4021 P-L	Kandinsky	September 24, 1960	Palomar	C. J. van Houten, I. van Houten-Groeneveld, T. Gehrels	·	11 km (6.8 mi)	MPC · JPL
2663 Miltiades	6561 P-L	Miltiades	September 24, 1960	Palomar	C. J. van Houten, I. van Houten-Groeneveld, T. Gehrels	·	4.7 km (2.9 mi)	MPC · JPL
2664 Everhart	1934 RR	Everhart	September 7, 1934	Heidelberg	K. Reinmuth	·	11 km (6.8 mi)	MPC · JPL
2665 Schrutka	1938 DW_{1}	Schrutka	February 24, 1938	Heidelberg	A. Bohrmann	·	6.0 km (3.7 mi)	MPC · JPL
2666 Gramme	1951 TA	Gramme	October 8, 1951	Uccle	S. J. Arend	·	30 km (19 mi)	MPC · JPL
2667 Oikawa	1967 UO	Oikawa	October 30, 1967	Hamburg-Bergedorf	L. Kohoutek	THM	21 km (13 mi)	MPC · JPL
2668 Tataria	1976 QV	Tataria	August 26, 1976	Nauchnij	N. S. Chernykh	·	5.4 km (3.4 mi)	MPC · JPL
2669 Shostakovich	1976 YQ_{2}	Shostakovich	December 16, 1976	Nauchnij	L. I. Chernykh	·	16 km (9.9 mi)	MPC · JPL
2670 Chuvashia	1977 PW_{1}	Chuvashia	August 14, 1977	Nauchnij	N. S. Chernykh	EOS	21 km (13 mi)	MPC · JPL
2671 Abkhazia	1977 QR_{2}	Abkhazia	August 21, 1977	Nauchnij	N. S. Chernykh	·	9.5 km (5.9 mi)	MPC · JPL
2672 Písek	1979 KC	Písek	May 31, 1979	Kleť	Kveton, J.	EUN · slow ·	23 km (14 mi)	MPC · JPL
2673 Lossignol	1980 KN	Lossignol	May 22, 1980	La Silla	H. Debehogne	THM	15 km (9.3 mi)	MPC · JPL
2674 Pandarus	1982 BC_{3}	Pandarus	January 27, 1982	Harvard Observatory	Oak Ridge Observatory	L5	74 km (46 mi)	MPC · JPL
2675 Tolkien	1982 GB	Tolkien	April 14, 1982	Anderson Mesa	Watt, M.	slow	11 km (6.8 mi)	MPC · JPL
2676 Aarhus	1933 QV	Aarhus	August 25, 1933	Heidelberg	K. Reinmuth	·	8.0 km (5.0 mi)	MPC · JPL
2677 Joan	1935 FF	Joan	March 25, 1935	Nice	M. Laugier	EOS	18 km (11 mi)	MPC · JPL
2678 Aavasaksa	1938 DF_{1}	Aavasaksa	February 24, 1938	Turku	Y. Väisälä	·	8.4 km (5.2 mi)	MPC · JPL
2679 Kittisvaara	1939 TG	Kittisvaara	October 7, 1939	Turku	Y. Väisälä	·	10 km (6.2 mi)	MPC · JPL
2680 Mateo	1975 NF	Mateo	July 1, 1975	El Leoncito	Félix Aguilar Observatory	NYS · moon	6.5 km (4.0 mi)	MPC · JPL
2681 Ostrovskij	1975 VF_{2}	Ostrovskij	November 2, 1975	Nauchnij	T. M. Smirnova	·	13 km (8.1 mi)	MPC · JPL
2682 Soromundi	1979 MF_{4}	Soromundi	June 25, 1979	Siding Spring	E. F. Helin, S. J. Bus	(1338) (FLO)	5.3 km (3.3 mi)	MPC · JPL
2683 Brian	1981 AD_{1}	Brian	January 10, 1981	Anderson Mesa	N. G. Thomas	KOR	11 km (6.8 mi)	MPC · JPL
2684 Douglas	1981 AH_{1}	Douglas	January 3, 1981	Anderson Mesa	N. G. Thomas	EOS	16 km (9.9 mi)	MPC · JPL
2685 Masursky	1981 JN	Masursky	May 3, 1981	Anderson Mesa	E. Bowell	EUN	11 km (6.8 mi)	MPC · JPL
2686 Linda Susan	1981 JW_{1}	Linda Susan	May 5, 1981	Palomar	C. S. Shoemaker	EOS	16 km (9.9 mi)	MPC · JPL
2687 Tortali	1982 HG	Tortali	April 18, 1982	Anderson Mesa	Watt, M.	·	14 km (8.7 mi)	MPC · JPL
2688 Halley	1982 HG_{1}	Halley	April 25, 1982	Anderson Mesa	E. Bowell	THM	22 km (14 mi)	MPC · JPL
2689 Bruxelles	1935 CF	Bruxelles	February 3, 1935	Uccle	S. J. Arend	slow	6.6 km (4.1 mi)	MPC · JPL
2690 Ristiina	1938 DG_{1}	Ristiina	February 24, 1938	Turku	Y. Väisälä	EOS	18 km (11 mi)	MPC · JPL
2691 Sérsic	1974 KB	Sérsic	May 18, 1974	El Leoncito	Félix Aguilar Observatory	moon	5.4 km (3.4 mi)	MPC · JPL
2692 Chkalov	1976 YT_{3}	Chkalov	December 16, 1976	Nauchnij	L. I. Chernykh	·	16 km (9.9 mi)	MPC · JPL
2693 Yan'an	1977 VM_{1}	Yan'an	November 3, 1977	Nanking	Purple Mountain	·	7.0 km (4.3 mi)	MPC · JPL
2694 Pino Torinese	1979 QL_{1}	Pino Torinese	August 22, 1979	La Silla	C.-I. Lagerkvist	·	5.6 km (3.5 mi)	MPC · JPL
2695 Christabel	1979 UE	Christabel	October 17, 1979	Anderson Mesa	E. Bowell	·	15 km (9.3 mi)	MPC · JPL
2696 Magion	1980 HB	Magion	April 16, 1980	Kleť	L. Brožek	PHO · slow	25 km (16 mi)	MPC · JPL
2697 Albina	1969 TC_{3}	Albina	October 9, 1969	Nauchnij	B. A. Burnasheva	CYB	52 km (32 mi)	MPC · JPL
2698 Azerbajdzhan	1971 TZ	Azerbajdzhan	October 11, 1971	Nauchnij	Crimean Astrophysical Observatory	·	15 km (9.3 mi)	MPC · JPL
2699 Kalinin	1976 YX	Kalinin	December 16, 1976	Nauchnij	L. I. Chernykh	·	13 km (8.1 mi)	MPC · JPL
2700 Baikonur	1976 YP_{7}	Baikonur	December 20, 1976	Nauchnij	N. S. Chernykh	KOR	12 km (7.5 mi)	MPC · JPL

== 2701–2800 ==
back to top

Designation			Discovery			Properties		Ref
Permanent	Provisional	Named after	Date	Site	Discoverer(s)	Category	Diam.	Ref
2701 Cherson	1978 RT	Cherson	September 1, 1978	Nauchnij	N. S. Chernykh	·	15 km (9.3 mi)	MPC · JPL
2702 Batrakov	1978 SZ_{2}	Batrakov	September 26, 1978	Nauchnij	L. V. Zhuravleva	CYB	25 km (16 mi)	MPC · JPL
2703 Rodari	1979 FT_{2}	Rodari	March 29, 1979	Nauchnij	N. S. Chernykh	·	5.3 km (3.3 mi)	MPC · JPL
2704 Julian Loewe	1979 MR_{4}	Julian Loewe	June 25, 1979	Siding Spring	E. F. Helin, S. J. Bus	·	5.2 km (3.2 mi)	MPC · JPL
2705 Wu	1980 TD_{4}	Wu	October 9, 1980	Palomar	C. S. Shoemaker	slow	5.9 km (3.7 mi)	MPC · JPL
2706 Borovský	1980 VW	Borovský	November 11, 1980	Kleť	Z. Vávrová	EOS	15 km (9.3 mi)	MPC · JPL
2707 Ueferji	1981 QS_{3}	Ueferji	August 28, 1981	La Silla	H. Debehogne	·	26 km (16 mi)	MPC · JPL
2708 Burns	1981 WT	Burns	November 24, 1981	Anderson Mesa	E. Bowell	THM	20 km (12 mi)	MPC · JPL
2709 Sagan	1982 FH	Sagan	March 21, 1982	Anderson Mesa	E. Bowell	·	6.6 km (4.1 mi)	MPC · JPL
2710 Veverka	1982 FQ	Veverka	March 23, 1982	Anderson Mesa	E. Bowell	NYS	8.6 km (5.3 mi)	MPC · JPL
2711 Aleksandrov	1978 QB_{2}	Aleksandrov	August 31, 1978	Nauchnij	N. S. Chernykh	EOS	14 km (8.7 mi)	MPC · JPL
2712 Keaton	1937 YD	Keaton	December 29, 1937	Konkoly	G. Kulin	·	5.7 km (3.5 mi)	MPC · JPL
2713 Luxembourg	1938 EA	Luxembourg	February 19, 1938	Uccle	E. Delporte	KOR	15 km (9.3 mi)	MPC · JPL
2714 Matti	1938 GC	Matti	April 5, 1938	Turku	H. Alikoski	·	7.1 km (4.4 mi)	MPC · JPL
2715 Mielikki	1938 US	Mielikki	October 22, 1938	Turku	Y. Väisälä	·	13 km (8.1 mi)	MPC · JPL
2716 Tuulikki	1939 TM	Tuulikki	October 7, 1939	Turku	Y. Väisälä	·	5.2 km (3.2 mi)	MPC · JPL
2717 Tellervo	1940 WJ	Tellervo	November 29, 1940	Turku	L. Oterma	·	9.0 km (5.6 mi)	MPC · JPL
2718 Handley	1951 OM	Handley	July 30, 1951	Johannesburg	E. L. Johnson	THM	25 km (16 mi)	MPC · JPL
2719 Suzhou	1965 SU	Suzhou	September 22, 1965	Nanking	Purple Mountain	·	6.8 km (4.2 mi)	MPC · JPL
2720 Pyotr Pervyj	1972 RV_{3}	Pyotr Pervyj	September 6, 1972	Nauchnij	L. V. Zhuravleva	·	8.9 km (5.5 mi)	MPC · JPL
2721 Vsekhsvyatskij	1973 SP_{2}	Vsekhsvyatskij	September 22, 1973	Nauchnij	N. S. Chernykh	THM	18 km (11 mi)	MPC · JPL
2722 Abalakin	1976 GM_{2}	Abalakin	April 1, 1976	Nauchnij	N. S. Chernykh	THM	19 km (12 mi)	MPC · JPL
2723 Gorshkov	1978 QL_{2}	Gorshkov	August 31, 1978	Nauchnij	N. S. Chernykh	THM	13 km (8.1 mi)	MPC · JPL
2724 Orlov	1978 RZ_{5}	Orlov	September 13, 1978	Nauchnij	N. S. Chernykh	·	21 km (13 mi)	MPC · JPL
2725 David Bender	1978 VG_{3}	David Bender	November 7, 1978	Palomar	E. F. Helin, S. J. Bus	·	37 km (23 mi)	MPC · JPL
2726 Kotelnikov	1979 SE_{9}	Kotelnikov	September 22, 1979	Nauchnij	N. S. Chernykh	KOR	11 km (6.8 mi)	MPC · JPL
2727 Paton	1979 SO_{9}	Paton	September 22, 1979	Nauchnij	N. S. Chernykh	·	9.1 km (5.7 mi)	MPC · JPL
2728 Yatskiv	1979 ST_{9}	Yatskiv	September 22, 1979	Nauchnij	N. S. Chernykh	·	15 km (9.3 mi)	MPC · JPL
2729 Urumqi	1979 UA_{2}	Urumqi	October 18, 1979	Nanking	Purple Mountain	KOR	15 km (9.3 mi)	MPC · JPL
2730 Barks	1981 QH	Barks	August 30, 1981	Anderson Mesa	E. Bowell	·	16 km (9.9 mi)	MPC · JPL
2731 Cucula	1982 KJ	Cucula	May 21, 1982	Zimmerwald	P. Wild	·	45 km (28 mi)	MPC · JPL
2732 Witt	1926 FG	Witt	March 19, 1926	Heidelberg	M. F. Wolf	·	11 km (6.8 mi)	MPC · JPL
2733 Hamina	1938 DQ	Hamina	February 22, 1938	Turku	Y. Väisälä	·	7.4 km (4.6 mi)	MPC · JPL
2734 Hašek	1976 GJ_{3}	Hašek	April 1, 1976	Nauchnij	N. S. Chernykh	·	25 km (16 mi)	MPC · JPL
2735 Ellen	1977 RB	Ellen	September 13, 1977	Palomar	S. J. Bus, T. Lauer	H · slow	3.5 km (2.2 mi)	MPC · JPL
2736 Ops	1979 OC	Ops	July 23, 1979	Anderson Mesa	E. Bowell	·	4.0 km (2.5 mi)	MPC · JPL
2737 Kotka	1938 DU	Kotka	February 22, 1938	Turku	Y. Väisälä	·	13 km (8.1 mi)	MPC · JPL
2738 Viracocha	1940 EC	Viracocha	March 12, 1940	Konkoly	G. Kulin	·	10 km (6.2 mi)	MPC · JPL
2739 Taguacipa	1952 UZ_{1}	Taguacipa	October 17, 1952	Mount Wilson	J. L. Brady	·	11 km (6.8 mi)	MPC · JPL
2740 Tsoj	1974 SY_{4}	Tsoj	September 26, 1974	Nauchnij	L. V. Zhuravleva	EOS	18 km (11 mi)	MPC · JPL
2741 Valdivia	1975 XG	Valdivia	December 1, 1975	Cerro El Roble	C. Torres, Barros, S.	·	12 km (7.5 mi)	MPC · JPL
2742 Gibson	1981 JG_{3}	Gibson	May 6, 1981	Palomar	C. S. Shoemaker	KOR	11 km (6.8 mi)	MPC · JPL
2743 Chengdu	1965 WR	Chengdu	November 21, 1965	Nanking	Purple Mountain	EUN	9.0 km (5.6 mi)	MPC · JPL
2744 Birgitta	1975 RB	Birgitta	September 4, 1975	Kvistaberg	C.-I. Lagerkvist	·	3.4 km (2.1 mi)	MPC · JPL
2745 San Martín	1976 SR_{10}	San Martín	September 25, 1976	El Leoncito	Félix Aguilar Observatory	PHO	5.2 km (3.2 mi)	MPC · JPL
2746 Hissao	1979 SJ_{9}	Hissao	September 22, 1979	Nauchnij	N. S. Chernykh	·	5.2 km (3.2 mi)	MPC · JPL
2747 Český Krumlov	1980 DW	Český Krumlov	February 19, 1980	Kleť	A. Mrkos	slow	30 km (19 mi)	MPC · JPL
2748 Patrick Gene	1981 JF_{2}	Patrick Gene	May 5, 1981	Palomar	C. S. Shoemaker	·	8.5 km (5.3 mi)	MPC · JPL
2749 Walterhorn	1937 TD	Walterhorn	October 11, 1937	Heidelberg	K. Reinmuth	THM	14 km (8.7 mi)	MPC · JPL
2750 Loviisa	1940 YK	Loviisa	December 30, 1940	Turku	Y. Väisälä	slow	4.9 km (3.0 mi)	MPC · JPL
2751 Campbell	1962 RP	Campbell	September 7, 1962	Brooklyn	Indiana University	NYS	6.9 km (4.3 mi)	MPC · JPL
2752 Wu Chien-Shiung	1965 SP	Wu Chien-Shiung	September 20, 1965	Nanking	Purple Mountain	EOS	15 km (9.3 mi)	MPC · JPL
2753 Duncan	1966 DH	Duncan	February 18, 1966	Brooklyn	Indiana University	·	19 km (12 mi)	MPC · JPL
2754 Efimov	1966 PD	Efimov	August 13, 1966	Nauchnij	T. M. Smirnova	moon	5.2 km (3.2 mi)	MPC · JPL
2755 Avicenna	1973 SJ_{4}	Avicenna	September 26, 1973	Nauchnij	L. I. Chernykh	·	12 km (7.5 mi)	MPC · JPL
2756 Dzhangar	1974 SG_{1}	Dzhangar	September 19, 1974	Nauchnij	L. I. Chernykh	·	5.3 km (3.3 mi)	MPC · JPL
2757 Crisser	1977 VN	Crisser	November 11, 1977	Cerro El Roble	Barros, S.	THM	20 km (12 mi)	MPC · JPL
2758 Cordelia	1978 RF	Cordelia	September 1, 1978	Nauchnij	N. S. Chernykh	·	10 km (6.2 mi)	MPC · JPL
2759 Idomeneus	1980 GC	Idomeneus	April 14, 1980	Anderson Mesa	E. Bowell	L4 · slow	54 km (34 mi)	MPC · JPL
2760 Kacha	1980 TU_{6}	Kacha	October 8, 1980	Nauchnij	L. V. Zhuravleva	T_{j} (2.99) · 3:2	58 km (36 mi)	MPC · JPL
2761 Eddington	1981 AE	Eddington	January 1, 1981	Anderson Mesa	E. Bowell	·	16 km (9.9 mi)	MPC · JPL
2762 Fowler	1981 AT	Fowler	January 14, 1981	Anderson Mesa	E. Bowell	·	4.5 km (2.8 mi)	MPC · JPL
2763 Jeans	1982 OG	Jeans	July 24, 1982	Anderson Mesa	E. Bowell	·	7.5 km (4.7 mi)	MPC · JPL
2764 Moeller	1981 CN	Moeller	February 8, 1981	Anderson Mesa	N. G. Thomas	·	5.3 km (3.3 mi)	MPC · JPL
2765 Dinant	1981 EY	Dinant	March 4, 1981	La Silla	H. Debehogne, G. de Sanctis	·	24 km (15 mi)	MPC · JPL
2766 Leeuwenhoek	1982 FE_{1}	Leeuwenhoek	March 23, 1982	Kleť	Z. Vávrová	(5)	7.1 km (4.4 mi)	MPC · JPL
2767 Takenouchi	1967 UM	Takenouchi	October 30, 1967	Hamburg-Bergedorf	L. Kohoutek	EOS	14 km (8.7 mi)	MPC · JPL
2768 Gorky	1972 RX_{3}	Gorky	September 6, 1972	Nauchnij	L. V. Zhuravleva	(883)	8.9 km (5.5 mi)	MPC · JPL
2769 Mendeleev	1976 GZ_{2}	Mendeleev	April 1, 1976	Nauchnij	N. S. Chernykh	THM	14 km (8.7 mi)	MPC · JPL
2770 Tsvet	1977 SM_{1}	Tsvet	September 19, 1977	Nauchnij	N. S. Chernykh	·	7.2 km (4.5 mi)	MPC · JPL
2771 Polzunov	1978 SP_{7}	Polzunov	September 26, 1978	Nauchnij	L. V. Zhuravleva	·	11 km (6.8 mi)	MPC · JPL
2772 Dugan	1979 XE	Dugan	December 14, 1979	Anderson Mesa	E. Bowell	slow	9.6 km (6.0 mi)	MPC · JPL
2773 Brooks	1981 JZ_{2}	Brooks	May 6, 1981	Palomar	C. S. Shoemaker	·	13 km (8.1 mi)	MPC · JPL
2774 Tenojoki	1942 TJ	Tenojoki	October 3, 1942	Turku	L. Oterma	·	36 km (22 mi)	MPC · JPL
2775 Odishaw	1953 TX_{2}	Odishaw	October 14, 1953	Brooklyn	Indiana University	NYS	4.9 km (3.0 mi)	MPC · JPL
2776 Baikal	1976 SZ_{7}	Baikal	September 25, 1976	Nauchnij	N. S. Chernykh	slow	19 km (12 mi)	MPC · JPL
2777 Shukshin	1979 SY_{11}	Shukshin	September 24, 1979	Nauchnij	N. S. Chernykh	slow	6.4 km (4.0 mi)	MPC · JPL
2778 Tangshan	1979 XP	Tangshan	December 14, 1979	Nanking	Purple Mountain	·	13 km (8.1 mi)	MPC · JPL
2779 Mary	1981 CX	Mary	February 6, 1981	Anderson Mesa	N. G. Thomas	·	6.3 km (3.9 mi)	MPC · JPL
2780 Monnig	1981 DO_{2}	Monnig	February 28, 1981	Siding Spring	S. J. Bus	·	4.8 km (3.0 mi)	MPC · JPL
2781 Kleczek	1982 QH	Kleczek	August 19, 1982	Kleť	Z. Vávrová	THM	21 km (13 mi)	MPC · JPL
2782 Leonidas	2605 P-L	Leonidas	September 24, 1960	Palomar	C. J. van Houten, I. van Houten-Groeneveld, T. Gehrels	LEO	11 km (6.8 mi)	MPC · JPL
2783 Chernyshevskij	1974 RA_{2}	Chernyshevskij	September 14, 1974	Nauchnij	N. S. Chernykh	·	6.2 km (3.9 mi)	MPC · JPL
2784 Domeyko	1975 GA	Domeyko	April 15, 1975	Cerro El Roble	C. Torres	·	7.4 km (4.6 mi)	MPC · JPL
2785 Sedov	1978 QN_{2}	Sedov	August 31, 1978	Nauchnij	N. S. Chernykh	KOR	9.4 km (5.8 mi)	MPC · JPL
2786 Grinevia	1978 RR_{5}	Grinevia	September 6, 1978	Nauchnij	N. S. Chernykh	EUN	10 km (6.2 mi)	MPC · JPL
2787 Tovarishch	1978 RC_{6}	Tovarishch	September 13, 1978	Nauchnij	N. S. Chernykh	EOS	20 km (12 mi)	MPC · JPL
2788 Andenne	1981 EL	Andenne	March 1, 1981	La Silla	H. Debehogne, G. de Sanctis	·	6.9 km (4.3 mi)	MPC · JPL
2789 Foshan	1956 XA	Foshan	December 6, 1956	Nanking	Purple Mountain	·	4.8 km (3.0 mi)	MPC · JPL
2790 Needham	1965 UU_{1}	Needham	October 19, 1965	Nanking	Purple Mountain	EUN	7.9 km (4.9 mi)	MPC · JPL
2791 Paradise	1977 CA	Paradise	February 13, 1977	Palomar	S. J. Bus	PHO	8.4 km (5.2 mi)	MPC · JPL
2792 Ponomarev	1977 EY_{1}	Ponomarev	March 13, 1977	Nauchnij	N. S. Chernykh	slow	12 km (7.5 mi)	MPC · JPL
2793 Valdaj	1977 QV	Valdaj	August 19, 1977	Nauchnij	N. S. Chernykh	·	27 km (17 mi)	MPC · JPL
2794 Kulik	1978 PS_{3}	Kulik	August 8, 1978	Nauchnij	N. S. Chernykh	·	7.3 km (4.5 mi)	MPC · JPL
2795 Lepage	1979 YM	Lepage	December 16, 1979	La Silla	H. Debehogne, Netto, E. R.	·	5.9 km (3.7 mi)	MPC · JPL
2796 Kron	1980 EC	Kron	March 13, 1980	Anderson Mesa	E. Bowell	EUN	8.6 km (5.3 mi)	MPC · JPL
2797 Teucer	1981 LK	Teucer	June 4, 1981	Anderson Mesa	E. Bowell	L4	89 km (55 mi)	MPC · JPL
2798 Vergilius	2009 P-L	Vergilius	September 24, 1960	Palomar	C. J. van Houten, I. van Houten-Groeneveld, T. Gehrels	·	4.8 km (3.0 mi)	MPC · JPL
2799 Justus	3071 P-L	Justus	September 25, 1960	Palomar	C. J. van Houten, I. van Houten-Groeneveld, T. Gehrels	V	3.3 km (2.1 mi)	MPC · JPL
2800 Ovidius	4585 P-L	Ovidius	September 24, 1960	Palomar	C. J. van Houten, I. van Houten-Groeneveld, T. Gehrels	THM	15 km (9.3 mi)	MPC · JPL

== 2801–2900 ==
back to top

Designation			Discovery			Properties		Ref
Permanent	Provisional	Named after	Date	Site	Discoverer(s)	Category	Diam.	Ref
2801 Huygens	1935 SU_{1}	Huygens	September 28, 1935	Johannesburg	H. van Gent	GEF	12 km (7.5 mi)	MPC · JPL
2802 Weisell	1939 BU	Weisell	January 19, 1939	Turku	Y. Väisälä	·	19 km (12 mi)	MPC · JPL
2803 Vilho	1940 WG	Vilho	November 29, 1940	Turku	L. Oterma	THM	21 km (13 mi)	MPC · JPL
2804 Yrjö	1941 HF	Yrjö	April 19, 1941	Turku	L. Oterma	EOS	18 km (11 mi)	MPC · JPL
2805 Kalle	1941 UM	Kalle	October 15, 1941	Turku	L. Oterma	·	17 km (11 mi)	MPC · JPL
2806 Graz	1953 GG	Graz	April 7, 1953	Heidelberg	K. Reinmuth	·	13 km (8.1 mi)	MPC · JPL
2807 Karl Marx	1969 TH_{6}	Karl Marx	October 15, 1969	Nauchnij	L. I. Chernykh	DOR	17 km (11 mi)	MPC · JPL
2808 Belgrano	1976 HS	Belgrano	April 23, 1976	El Leoncito	Félix Aguilar Observatory	EOS · slow	15 km (9.3 mi)	MPC · JPL
2809 Vernadskij	1978 QW_{2}	Vernadskij	August 31, 1978	Nauchnij	N. S. Chernykh	NYS	12 km (7.5 mi)	MPC · JPL
2810 Lev Tolstoj	1978 RU_{5}	Lev Tolstoj	September 13, 1978	Nauchnij	N. S. Chernykh	EUN	7.9 km (4.9 mi)	MPC · JPL
2811 Střemchoví	1980 JA	Střemchoví	May 10, 1980	Kleť	A. Mrkos	KOR	12 km (7.5 mi)	MPC · JPL
2812 Scaltriti	1981 FN	Scaltriti	March 30, 1981	Anderson Mesa	E. Bowell	·	6.0 km (3.7 mi)	MPC · JPL
2813 Zappalà	1981 WZ	Zappalà	November 24, 1981	Anderson Mesa	E. Bowell	·	32 km (20 mi)	MPC · JPL
2814 Vieira	1982 FA_{3}	Vieira	March 18, 1982	La Silla	H. Debehogne	KOR	9.9 km (6.2 mi)	MPC · JPL
2815 Soma	1982 RL	Soma	September 15, 1982	Anderson Mesa	E. Bowell	moon	6.6 km (4.1 mi)	MPC · JPL
2816 Pien	1982 SO	Pien	September 22, 1982	Anderson Mesa	E. Bowell	·	28 km (17 mi)	MPC · JPL
2817 Perec	1982 UJ	Perec	October 17, 1982	Anderson Mesa	E. Bowell	·	10 km (6.2 mi)	MPC · JPL
2818 Juvenalis	2580 P-L	Juvenalis	September 24, 1960	Palomar	C. J. van Houten, I. van Houten-Groeneveld, T. Gehrels	NYS	3.9 km (2.4 mi)	MPC · JPL
2819 Ensor	1933 UR	Ensor	October 20, 1933	Uccle	E. Delporte	slow	9.7 km (6.0 mi)	MPC · JPL
2820 Iisalmi	1942 RU	Iisalmi	September 8, 1942	Turku	Y. Väisälä	·	6.8 km (4.2 mi)	MPC · JPL
2821 Slávka	1978 SQ	Slávka	September 24, 1978	Kleť	Z. Vávrová	·	3.9 km (2.4 mi)	MPC · JPL
2822 Sacajawea	1980 EG	Sacajawea	March 14, 1980	Anderson Mesa	E. Bowell	EUN	8.7 km (5.4 mi)	MPC · JPL
2823 van der Laan	2010 P-L	van der Laan	September 24, 1960	Palomar	C. J. van Houten, I. van Houten-Groeneveld, T. Gehrels	·	5.4 km (3.4 mi)	MPC · JPL
2824 Franke	1934 CZ	Franke	February 4, 1934	Heidelberg	K. Reinmuth	·	7.9 km (4.9 mi)	MPC · JPL
2825 Crosby	1938 SD_{1}	Crosby	September 19, 1938	Johannesburg	C. Jackson	moon	5.1 km (3.2 mi)	MPC · JPL
2826 Ahti	1939 UJ	Ahti	October 18, 1939	Turku	Y. Väisälä	(1118)	40 km (25 mi)	MPC · JPL
2827 Vellamo	1942 CC	Vellamo	February 11, 1942	Turku	L. Oterma	·	9.3 km (5.8 mi)	MPC · JPL
2828 Iku-Turso	1942 DL	Iku-Turso	February 18, 1942	Turku	L. Oterma	·	7.3 km (4.5 mi)	MPC · JPL
2829 Bobhope	1948 PK	Bobhope	August 9, 1948	Johannesburg	E. L. Johnson	·	41 km (25 mi)	MPC · JPL
2830 Greenwich	1980 GA	Greenwich	April 14, 1980	Anderson Mesa	E. Bowell	PHO	7.9 km (4.9 mi)	MPC · JPL
2831 Stevin	1930 SZ	Stevin	September 17, 1930	Johannesburg	H. van Gent	slow	5.5 km (3.4 mi)	MPC · JPL
2832 Lada	1975 EC_{1}	Lada	March 6, 1975	Nauchnij	N. S. Chernykh	·	6.1 km (3.8 mi)	MPC · JPL
2833 Radishchev	1978 PC_{4}	Radishchev	August 9, 1978	Nauchnij	L. I. Chernykh, N. S. Chernykh	KOR	10 km (6.2 mi)	MPC · JPL
2834 Christy Carol	1980 TB_{4}	Christy Carol	October 9, 1980	Palomar	C. S. Shoemaker	·	11 km (6.8 mi)	MPC · JPL
2835 Ryoma	1982 WF	Ryoma	November 20, 1982	Geisei	T. Seki	·	24 km (15 mi)	MPC · JPL
2836 Sobolev	1978 YQ	Sobolev	December 22, 1978	Nauchnij	N. S. Chernykh	EOS	19 km (12 mi)	MPC · JPL
2837 Griboedov	1971 TJ_{2}	Griboedov	October 13, 1971	Nauchnij	L. I. Chernykh	KOR	12 km (7.5 mi)	MPC · JPL
2838 Takase	1971 UM_{1}	Takase	October 26, 1971	Hamburg-Bergedorf	L. Kohoutek	·	3.8 km (2.4 mi)	MPC · JPL
2839 Annette	1929 TP	Annette	October 5, 1929	Flagstaff	C. W. Tombaugh	·	7.3 km (4.5 mi)	MPC · JPL
2840 Kallavesi	1941 UP	Kallavesi	October 15, 1941	Turku	L. Oterma	slow	7.7 km (4.8 mi)	MPC · JPL
2841 Puijo	1943 DM	Puijo	February 26, 1943	Turku	L. Oterma	·	6.3 km (3.9 mi)	MPC · JPL
2842 Unsöld	1950 OD	Unsöld	July 25, 1950	Brooklyn	Indiana University	EUN	14 km (8.7 mi)	MPC · JPL
2843 Yeti	1975 XQ	Yeti	December 7, 1975	Zimmerwald	P. Wild	slow	7.6 km (4.7 mi)	MPC · JPL
2844 Hess	1981 JP	Hess	May 3, 1981	Anderson Mesa	E. Bowell	slow	6.3 km (3.9 mi)	MPC · JPL
2845 Franklinken	1981 OF	Franklinken	July 26, 1981	Anderson Mesa	E. Bowell	slow	5.4 km (3.4 mi)	MPC · JPL
2846 Ylppö	1942 CJ	Ylppö	February 12, 1942	Turku	L. Oterma	·	28 km (17 mi)	MPC · JPL
2847 Parvati	1959 CC_{1}	Parvati	February 1, 1959	Flagstaff	Lowell Observatory	moon	6.9 km (4.3 mi)	MPC · JPL
2848 ASP	1959 VF	ASP	November 8, 1959	Brooklyn	Indiana University	THM	26 km (16 mi)	MPC · JPL
2849 Shklovskij	1976 GN_{3}	Shklovskij	April 1, 1976	Nauchnij	N. S. Chernykh	·	14 km (8.7 mi)	MPC · JPL
2850 Mozhaiskij	1978 TM_{7}	Mozhaiskij	October 2, 1978	Nauchnij	L. V. Zhuravleva	·	7.0 km (4.3 mi)	MPC · JPL
2851 Harbin	1978 UQ_{2}	Harbin	October 30, 1978	Nanking	Purple Mountain	·	8.8 km (5.5 mi)	MPC · JPL
2852 Declercq	1981 QU_{2}	Declercq	August 23, 1981	La Silla	H. Debehogne	AST	13 km (8.1 mi)	MPC · JPL
2853 Harvill	1963 RG	Harvill	September 14, 1963	Brooklyn	Indiana University	·	7.0 km (4.3 mi)	MPC · JPL
2854 Rawson	1964 JE	Rawson	May 6, 1964	Córdoba	McLeish, D.	·	7.2 km (4.5 mi)	MPC · JPL
2855 Bastian	1931 TB_{2}	Bastian	October 10, 1931	Heidelberg	K. Reinmuth	·	9.0 km (5.6 mi)	MPC · JPL
2856 Röser	1933 GB	Röser	April 14, 1933	Heidelberg	K. Reinmuth	EOS	24 km (15 mi)	MPC · JPL
2857 NOT	1942 DA	NOT	February 17, 1942	Turku	L. Oterma	·	9.3 km (5.8 mi)	MPC · JPL
2858 Carlosporter	1975 XB	Carlosporter	December 1, 1975	Cerro El Roble	C. Torres, Barros, S.	BAP	4.4 km (2.7 mi)	MPC · JPL
2859 Paganini	1978 RW_{1}	Paganini	September 5, 1978	Nauchnij	N. S. Chernykh	·	4.3 km (2.7 mi)	MPC · JPL
2860 Pasacentennium	1978 TA	Pasacentennium	October 8, 1978	Palomar	E. F. Helin	PHO · moon	6.8 km (4.2 mi)	MPC · JPL
2861 Lambrecht	1981 VL_{2}	Lambrecht	November 3, 1981	Tautenburg Observatory	F. Börngen, Kirsch, K.	slow	17 km (11 mi)	MPC · JPL
2862 Vavilov	1977 JP	Vavilov	May 15, 1977	Nauchnij	N. S. Chernykh	slow	6.0 km (3.7 mi)	MPC · JPL
2863 Ben Mayer	1981 QG_{2}	Ben Mayer	August 30, 1981	Anderson Mesa	E. Bowell	THM	18 km (11 mi)	MPC · JPL
2864 Soderblom	1983 AZ	Soderblom	January 12, 1983	Anderson Mesa	B. A. Skiff	·	16 km (9.9 mi)	MPC · JPL
2865 Laurel	1935 OK	Laurel	July 31, 1935	Johannesburg	C. Jackson	MAR	25 km (16 mi)	MPC · JPL
2866 Hardy	1961 TA	Hardy	October 7, 1961	Uccle	S. J. Arend	·	11 km (6.8 mi)	MPC · JPL
2867 Šteins	1969 VC	Šteins	November 4, 1969	Nauchnij	N. S. Chernykh	·	5.2 km (3.2 mi)	MPC · JPL
2868 Upupa	1972 UA	Upupa	October 30, 1972	Zimmerwald	P. Wild	·	12 km (7.5 mi)	MPC · JPL
2869 Nepryadva	1980 RM_{2}	Nepryadva	September 7, 1980	Nauchnij	N. S. Chernykh	EUN · slow	8.6 km (5.3 mi)	MPC · JPL
2870 Haupt	1981 LD	Haupt	June 4, 1981	Anderson Mesa	E. Bowell	slow	15 km (9.3 mi)	MPC · JPL
2871 Schober	1981 QC_{2}	Schober	August 30, 1981	Anderson Mesa	E. Bowell	moon	6.8 km (4.2 mi)	MPC · JPL
2872 Gentelec	1981 RU	Gentelec	September 5, 1981	Harvard Observatory	Oak Ridge Observatory	·	14 km (8.7 mi)	MPC · JPL
2873 Binzel	1982 FR	Binzel	March 28, 1982	Anderson Mesa	E. Bowell	moon	6.4 km (4.0 mi)	MPC · JPL
2874 Jim Young	1982 TH	Jim Young	October 13, 1982	Anderson Mesa	E. Bowell	slow	6.6 km (4.1 mi)	MPC · JPL
2875 Lagerkvist	1983 CL	Lagerkvist	February 11, 1983	Anderson Mesa	E. Bowell	GEF	9.5 km (5.9 mi)	MPC · JPL
2876 Aeschylus	6558 P-L	Aeschylus	September 24, 1960	Palomar	C. J. van Houten, I. van Houten-Groeneveld, T. Gehrels	·	6.8 km (4.2 mi)	MPC · JPL
2877 Likhachev	1969 TR_{2}	Likhachev	October 8, 1969	Nauchnij	L. I. Chernykh	THM	20 km (12 mi)	MPC · JPL
2878 Panacea	1980 RX	Panacea	September 7, 1980	Anderson Mesa	E. Bowell	EOS	16 km (9.9 mi)	MPC · JPL
2879 Shimizu	1932 CB_{1}	Shimizu	February 14, 1932	Heidelberg	K. Reinmuth	·	22 km (14 mi)	MPC · JPL
2880 Nihondaira	1983 CA	Nihondaira	February 8, 1983	Geisei	T. Seki	·	7.1 km (4.4 mi)	MPC · JPL
2881 Meiden	1983 AA_{1}	Meiden	January 12, 1983	Anderson Mesa	B. A. Skiff	·	5.7 km (3.5 mi)	MPC · JPL
2882 Tedesco	1981 OG	Tedesco	July 26, 1981	Anderson Mesa	E. Bowell	THM	22 km (14 mi)	MPC · JPL
2883 Barabashov	1978 RG_{6}	Barabashov	September 13, 1978	Nauchnij	N. S. Chernykh	moon	4.9 km (3.0 mi)	MPC · JPL
2884 Reddish	1981 ES_{22}	Reddish	March 2, 1981	Siding Spring	S. J. Bus	THM	20 km (12 mi)	MPC · JPL
2885 Palva	1939 TC	Palva	October 7, 1939	Turku	Y. Väisälä	·	4.3 km (2.7 mi)	MPC · JPL
2886 Tinkaping	1965 YG	Tinkaping	December 20, 1965	Nanking	Purple Mountain	·	5.8 km (3.6 mi)	MPC · JPL
2887 Krinov	1977 QD_{5}	Krinov	August 22, 1977	Nauchnij	N. S. Chernykh	·	6.2 km (3.9 mi)	MPC · JPL
2888 Hodgson	1982 TO	Hodgson	October 13, 1982	Anderson Mesa	E. Bowell	·	5.4 km (3.4 mi)	MPC · JPL
2889 Brno	1981 WT_{1}	Brno	November 17, 1981	Kleť	A. Mrkos	EOS	17 km (11 mi)	MPC · JPL
2890 Vilyujsk	1978 SY_{7}	Vilyujsk	September 26, 1978	Nauchnij	L. V. Zhuravleva	·	8.0 km (5.0 mi)	MPC · JPL
2891 McGetchin	1980 MD	Thomas R. McGetchin	June 18, 1980	Palomar	C. S. Shoemaker	CYB · slow	35 km (22 mi)	MPC · JPL
2892 Filipenko	1983 AX_{2}	Filipenko	January 13, 1983	Nauchnij	L. G. Karachkina	·	69 km (43 mi)	MPC · JPL
2893 Peiroos	1975 QD	Peiroos	August 30, 1975	El Leoncito	Félix Aguilar Observatory	L5	87 km (54 mi)	MPC · JPL
2894 Kakhovka	1978 SH_{5}	Kakhovka	September 27, 1978	Nauchnij	L. I. Chernykh	THM ·	13 km (8.1 mi)	MPC · JPL
2895 Memnon	1981 AE_{1}	Memnon	January 10, 1981	Anderson Mesa	N. G. Thomas	L5	57 km (35 mi)	MPC · JPL
2896 Preiss	1931 RN	Preiss	September 15, 1931	Heidelberg	K. Reinmuth	·	7.1 km (4.4 mi)	MPC · JPL
2897 Ole Römer	1932 CK	Ole Römer	February 5, 1932	Heidelberg	K. Reinmuth	·	5.2 km (3.2 mi)	MPC · JPL
2898 Neuvo	1938 DN	Neuvo	February 20, 1938	Turku	Y. Väisälä	·	11 km (6.8 mi)	MPC · JPL
2899 Runrun Shaw	1964 TR_{2}	Runrun Shaw	October 8, 1964	Nanking	Purple Mountain	·	4.8 km (3.0 mi)	MPC · JPL
2900 Luboš Perek	1972 AR	Luboš Perek	January 14, 1972	Hamburg-Bergedorf	L. Kohoutek	EOS	13 km (8.1 mi)	MPC · JPL

== 2901–3000 ==
back to top

Designation			Discovery			Properties		Ref
Permanent	Provisional	Named after	Date	Site	Discoverer(s)	Category	Diam.	Ref
2901 Bagehot	1973 DP	Bagehot	February 27, 1973	Hamburg-Bergedorf	L. Kohoutek	KOR	10 km (6.2 mi)	MPC · JPL
2902 Westerlund	1980 FN_{3}	Westerlund	March 16, 1980	La Silla	C.-I. Lagerkvist	·	4.1 km (2.5 mi)	MPC · JPL
2903 Zhuhai	1981 UV_{9}	Zhuhai	October 23, 1981	Nanking	Purple Mountain	MAR	14 km (8.7 mi)	MPC · JPL
2904 Millman	1981 YB	Millman	December 20, 1981	Anderson Mesa	E. Bowell	·	15 km (9.3 mi)	MPC · JPL
2905 Plaskett	1982 BZ_{2}	Plaskett	January 24, 1982	Anderson Mesa	E. Bowell	GEF	10 km (6.2 mi)	MPC · JPL
2906 Caltech	1983 AE_{2}	Caltech	January 13, 1983	Palomar	C. S. Shoemaker	T_{j} (2.98)	59 km (37 mi)	MPC · JPL
2907 Nekrasov	1975 TT_{2}	Nekrasov	October 3, 1975	Nauchnij	L. I. Chernykh	EOS	17 km (11 mi)	MPC · JPL
2908 Shimoyama	1981 WA	Shimoyama	November 18, 1981	Tōkai	T. Furuta	slow	30 km (19 mi)	MPC · JPL
2909 Hoshi-no-ie	1983 JA	Hoshi-no-ie	May 9, 1983	Chirorin	S. Sei	EOS	21 km (13 mi)	MPC · JPL
2910 Yoshkar-Ola	1980 TK_{13}	Yoshkar-Ola	October 11, 1980	Nauchnij	N. S. Chernykh	·	4.1 km (2.5 mi)	MPC · JPL
2911 Miahelena	1938 GJ	Miahelena	April 8, 1938	Turku	H. Alikoski	GEF	12 km (7.5 mi)	MPC · JPL
2912 Lapalma	1942 DM	Lapalma	February 18, 1942	Turku	L. Oterma	·	6.5 km (4.0 mi)	MPC · JPL
2913 Horta	1931 TK	Horta	October 12, 1931	Uccle	E. Delporte	slow	10 km (6.2 mi)	MPC · JPL
2914 Glärnisch	1965 SB	Glärnisch	September 19, 1965	Zimmerwald	P. Wild	·	6.0 km (3.7 mi)	MPC · JPL
2915 Moskvina	1977 QY_{2}	Moskvina	August 22, 1977	Nauchnij	N. S. Chernykh	EUN · fast	5.4 km (3.4 mi)	MPC · JPL
2916 Voronveliya	1978 PW_{2}	Voronveliya	August 8, 1978	Nauchnij	N. S. Chernykh	·	4.9 km (3.0 mi)	MPC · JPL
2917 Sawyer Hogg	1980 RR	Sawyer Hogg	September 2, 1980	Anderson Mesa	E. Bowell	·	9.6 km (6.0 mi)	MPC · JPL
2918 Salazar	1980 TU_{4}	Salazar	October 9, 1980	Palomar	C. S. Shoemaker	THM · slow	20 km (12 mi)	MPC · JPL
2919 Dali	1981 EX_{18}	Dali	March 2, 1981	Siding Spring	S. J. Bus	THM	19 km (12 mi)	MPC · JPL
2920 Automedon	1981 JR	Automedon	May 3, 1981	Anderson Mesa	E. Bowell	L4	89 km (55 mi)	MPC · JPL
2921 Sophocles	6525 P-L	Sophocles	September 24, 1960	Palomar	C. J. van Houten, I. van Houten-Groeneveld, T. Gehrels	THM	11 km (6.8 mi)	MPC · JPL
2922 Dikanʹka	1976 GY_{1}	Dikanʹka	April 1, 1976	Nauchnij	N. S. Chernykh	·	5.7 km (3.5 mi)	MPC · JPL
2923 Schuyler	1977 DA	Schuyler	February 22, 1977	Harvard Observatory	Harvard Observatory	·	9.3 km (5.8 mi)	MPC · JPL
2924 Mitake-mura	1977 DJ_{2}	Mitake-mura	February 18, 1977	Kiso	H. Kosai, K. Furukawa	KOR	11 km (6.8 mi)	MPC · JPL
2925 Beatty	1978 VC_{5}	Beatty	November 7, 1978	Palomar	E. F. Helin, S. J. Bus	·	7.1 km (4.4 mi)	MPC · JPL
2926 Caldeira	1980 KG	Caldeira	May 22, 1980	La Silla	H. Debehogne	·	5.1 km (3.2 mi)	MPC · JPL
2927 Alamosa	1981 TM	Alamosa	October 5, 1981	Anderson Mesa	N. G. Thomas	·	10 km (6.2 mi)	MPC · JPL
2928 Epstein	1976 GN_{8}	Epstein	April 5, 1976	El Leoncito	Félix Aguilar Observatory	EOS	15 km (9.3 mi)	MPC · JPL
2929 Harris	1982 BK_{1}	Harris	January 24, 1982	Anderson Mesa	E. Bowell	·	16 km (9.9 mi)	MPC · JPL
2930 Euripides	6554 P-L	Euripides	September 24, 1960	Palomar	C. J. van Houten, I. van Houten-Groeneveld, T. Gehrels	HOF	15 km (9.3 mi)	MPC · JPL
2931 Mayakovsky	1969 UC	Mayakovsky	October 16, 1969	Nauchnij	L. I. Chernykh	KOR	12 km (7.5 mi)	MPC · JPL
2932 Kempchinsky	1980 TK_{4}	Kempchinsky	October 9, 1980	Palomar	C. S. Shoemaker	CYB	29 km (18 mi)	MPC · JPL
2933 Amber	1983 HN	Amber	April 18, 1983	Anderson Mesa	N. G. Thomas	·	20 km (12 mi)	MPC · JPL
2934 Aristophanes	4006 P-L	Aristophanes	September 25, 1960	Palomar	C. J. van Houten, I. van Houten-Groeneveld, T. Gehrels	VER ·	22 km (14 mi)	MPC · JPL
2935 Naerum	1976 UU	Naerum	October 24, 1976	La Silla	R. M. West	·	7.1 km (4.4 mi)	MPC · JPL
2936 Nechvíle	1979 SF	Nechvíle	September 17, 1979	Kleť	A. Mrkos	slow	9.5 km (5.9 mi)	MPC · JPL
2937 Gibbs	1980 LA	Gibbs	June 14, 1980	Anderson Mesa	E. Bowell	·	5.0 km (3.1 mi)	MPC · JPL
2938 Hopi	1980 LB	Hopi	June 14, 1980	Anderson Mesa	E. Bowell	T_{j} (2.75)	19 km (12 mi)	MPC · JPL
2939 Coconino	1982 DP	Coconino	February 21, 1982	Anderson Mesa	E. Bowell	·	5.6 km (3.5 mi)	MPC · JPL
2940 Bacon	3042 P-L	Bacon	September 24, 1960	Palomar	C. J. van Houten, I. van Houten-Groeneveld, T. Gehrels	DOR	9.0 km (5.6 mi)	MPC · JPL
2941 Alden	1930 YV	Alden	December 24, 1930	Flagstaff	C. W. Tombaugh	·	4.8 km (3.0 mi)	MPC · JPL
2942 Cordie	1932 BG	Cordie	January 29, 1932	Heidelberg	K. Reinmuth	·	6.7 km (4.2 mi)	MPC · JPL
2943 Heinrich	1933 QU	Heinrich	August 25, 1933	Heidelberg	K. Reinmuth	PHO	7.5 km (4.7 mi)	MPC · JPL
2944 Peyo	1935 QF	Peyo	August 31, 1935	Heidelberg	K. Reinmuth	·	9.0 km (5.6 mi)	MPC · JPL
2945 Zanstra	1935 ST_{1}	Zanstra	September 28, 1935	Johannesburg	H. van Gent	·	24 km (15 mi)	MPC · JPL
2946 Muchachos	1941 UV	Muchachos	October 15, 1941	Turku	L. Oterma	MAS ·	13 km (8.1 mi)	MPC · JPL
2947 Kippenhahn	1955 QP_{1}	Kippenhahn	August 22, 1955	Heidelberg	I. van Houten-Groeneveld	·	7.6 km (4.7 mi)	MPC · JPL
2948 Amosov	1969 TD_{2}	Amosov	October 8, 1969	Nauchnij	L. I. Chernykh	·	10 km (6.2 mi)	MPC · JPL
2949 Kaverznev	1970 PR	Kaverznev	August 9, 1970	Nauchnij	Crimean Astrophysical Observatory	·	7.0 km (4.3 mi)	MPC · JPL
2950 Rousseau	1974 VQ_{2}	Rousseau	November 9, 1974	Zimmerwald	P. Wild	·	10 km (6.2 mi)	MPC · JPL
2951 Perepadin	1977 RB_{8}	Perepadin	September 13, 1977	Nauchnij	N. S. Chernykh	·	47 km (29 mi)	MPC · JPL
2952 Lilliputia	1979 SF_{2}	Lilliputia	September 22, 1979	Nauchnij	N. S. Chernykh	·	6.0 km (3.7 mi)	MPC · JPL
2953 Vysheslavia	1979 SV_{11}	Vysheslavia	September 24, 1979	Nauchnij	N. S. Chernykh	KOR	13 km (8.1 mi)	MPC · JPL
2954 Delsemme	1982 BT_{1}	Delsemme	January 30, 1982	Anderson Mesa	E. Bowell	·	5.3 km (3.3 mi)	MPC · JPL
2955 Newburn	1982 BX_{1}	Newburn	January 30, 1982	Anderson Mesa	E. Bowell	·	5.4 km (3.4 mi)	MPC · JPL
2956 Yeomans	1982 HN_{1}	Yeomans	April 28, 1982	Anderson Mesa	E. Bowell	·	9.4 km (5.8 mi)	MPC · JPL
2957 Tatsuo	1934 CB_{1}	Tatsuo	February 5, 1934	Heidelberg	K. Reinmuth	EOS	22 km (14 mi)	MPC · JPL
2958 Arpetito	1981 DG	Arpetito	February 28, 1981	La Silla	H. Debehogne, G. de Sanctis	KOR	8.9 km (5.5 mi)	MPC · JPL
2959 Scholl	1983 RE_{2}	Scholl	September 4, 1983	Anderson Mesa	E. Bowell	T_{j} (2.99) · 3:2	33 km (21 mi)	MPC · JPL
2960 Ohtaki	1977 DK_{3}	Ohtaki	February 18, 1977	Kiso	H. Kosai, K. Furukawa	·	5.3 km (3.3 mi)	MPC · JPL
2961 Katsurahama	1982 XA	Katsurahama	December 7, 1982	Geisei	T. Seki	(2076)	5.7 km (3.5 mi)	MPC · JPL
2962 Otto	1940 YF	Otto	December 28, 1940	Turku	Y. Väisälä	MAR	17 km (11 mi)	MPC · JPL
2963 Chen Jiageng	1964 VM_{1}	Chen Jiageng	November 9, 1964	Nanking	Purple Mountain	KOR	9.5 km (5.9 mi)	MPC · JPL
2964 Jaschek	1974 OA_{1}	Jaschek	July 16, 1974	El Leoncito	Félix Aguilar Observatory	EUN	7.9 km (4.9 mi)	MPC · JPL
2965 Surikov	1975 BX	Surikov	January 18, 1975	Nauchnij	L. I. Chernykh	PHO	8.7 km (5.4 mi)	MPC · JPL
2966 Korsunia	1977 EB_{2}	Korsunia	March 13, 1977	Nauchnij	N. S. Chernykh	moon	5.9 km (3.7 mi)	MPC · JPL
2967 Vladisvyat	1977 SS_{1}	Vladisvyat	September 19, 1977	Nauchnij	N. S. Chernykh	URS	33 km (21 mi)	MPC · JPL
2968 Iliya	1978 QJ	Iliya	August 31, 1978	Nauchnij	N. S. Chernykh	·	4.5 km (2.8 mi)	MPC · JPL
2969 Mikula	1978 RU_{1}	Mikula	September 5, 1978	Nauchnij	N. S. Chernykh	KOR	8.3 km (5.2 mi)	MPC · JPL
2970 Pestalozzi	1978 UC	Pestalozzi	October 27, 1978	Zimmerwald	P. Wild	EUN · slow	6.9 km (4.3 mi)	MPC · JPL
2971 Mohr	1980 YL	Mohr	December 30, 1980	Kleť	A. Mrkos	·	5.2 km (3.2 mi)	MPC · JPL
2972 Niilo	1939 TB	Niilo	October 7, 1939	Turku	Y. Väisälä	·	4.7 km (2.9 mi)	MPC · JPL
2973 Paola	1951 AJ	Paola	January 10, 1951	Uccle	S. J. Arend	·	12 km (7.5 mi)	MPC · JPL
2974 Holden	1955 QK	Holden	August 23, 1955	Brooklyn	Indiana University	V · slow	5.9 km (3.7 mi)	MPC · JPL
2975 Spahr	1970 AF_{1}	Spahr	January 8, 1970	Cerro El Roble	H. Potter, Lokalov, A.	·	5.9 km (3.7 mi)	MPC · JPL
2976 Lautaro	1974 HR	Lautaro	April 22, 1974	Cerro El Roble	C. Torres	CYB	46 km (29 mi)	MPC · JPL
2977 Chivilikhin	1974 SP	Chivilikhin	September 19, 1974	Nauchnij	L. I. Chernykh	GEF	9.0 km (5.6 mi)	MPC · JPL
2978 Roudebush	1978 SR	Roudebush	September 26, 1978	Harvard Observatory	Harvard Observatory	THM	19 km (12 mi)	MPC · JPL
2979 Murmansk	1978 TB_{7}	Murmansk	October 2, 1978	Nauchnij	L. V. Zhuravleva	·	21 km (13 mi)	MPC · JPL
2980 Cameron	1981 EU_{17}	Cameron	March 2, 1981	Siding Spring	S. J. Bus	RAF	5.1 km (3.2 mi)	MPC · JPL
2981 Chagall	1981 EE_{20}	Chagall	March 2, 1981	Siding Spring	S. J. Bus	THM	15 km (9.3 mi)	MPC · JPL
2982 Muriel	1981 JA_{3}	Muriel	May 6, 1981	Palomar	C. S. Shoemaker	EOS	15 km (9.3 mi)	MPC · JPL
2983 Poltava	1981 RW_{2}	Poltava	September 2, 1981	Nauchnij	N. S. Chernykh	·	31 km (19 mi)	MPC · JPL
2984 Chaucer	1981 YD	Chaucer	December 30, 1981	Anderson Mesa	E. Bowell	NYS	15 km (9.3 mi)	MPC · JPL
2985 Shakespeare	1983 TV_{1}	Shakespeare	October 12, 1983	Anderson Mesa	E. Bowell	KOR	10 km (6.2 mi)	MPC · JPL
2986 Mrinalini	2525 P-L	Mrinalini	September 24, 1960	Palomar	C. J. van Houten, I. van Houten-Groeneveld, T. Gehrels	·	19 km (12 mi)	MPC · JPL
2987 Sarabhai	4583 P-L	Sarabhai	September 24, 1960	Palomar	C. J. van Houten, I. van Houten-Groeneveld, T. Gehrels	·	18 km (11 mi)	MPC · JPL
2988 Korhonen	1943 EM	Korhonen	March 1, 1943	Turku	L. Oterma	EUN	14 km (8.7 mi)	MPC · JPL
2989 Imago	1976 UF_{1}	Imago	October 22, 1976	Zimmerwald	P. Wild	·	6.0 km (3.7 mi)	MPC · JPL
2990 Trimberger	1981 EN_{27}	Trimberger	March 2, 1981	Siding Spring	S. J. Bus	NYS ·	11 km (6.8 mi)	MPC · JPL
2991 Bilbo	1982 HV	Bilbo	April 21, 1982	Anderson Mesa	Watt, M.	·	7.8 km (4.8 mi)	MPC · JPL
2992 Vondel	2540 P-L	Vondel	September 24, 1960	Palomar	C. J. van Houten, I. van Houten-Groeneveld, T. Gehrels	·	11 km (6.8 mi)	MPC · JPL
2993 Wendy	1970 PA	Wendy	August 4, 1970	Bickley	Perth Observatory	EUN	11 km (6.8 mi)	MPC · JPL
2994 Flynn	1975 PA	Flynn	August 14, 1975	Bickley	Perth Observatory	·	6.8 km (4.2 mi)	MPC · JPL
2995 Taratuta	1978 QK	Taratuta	August 31, 1978	Nauchnij	N. S. Chernykh	·	17 km (11 mi)	MPC · JPL
2996 Bowman	1954 RJ	Bowman	September 5, 1954	Brooklyn	Indiana University	HOF ·	20 km (12 mi)	MPC · JPL
2997 Cabrera	1974 MJ	Cabrera	June 17, 1974	El Leoncito	Félix Aguilar Observatory	·	8.3 km (5.2 mi)	MPC · JPL
2998 Berendeya	1975 TR_{3}	Berendeya	October 3, 1975	Nauchnij	L. I. Chernykh	NYS	4.3 km (2.7 mi)	MPC · JPL
2999 Dante	1981 CY	Dante	February 6, 1981	Anderson Mesa	N. G. Thomas	BAP	6.9 km (4.3 mi)	MPC · JPL
3000 Leonardo	1981 EG_{19}	Leonardo	March 2, 1981	Siding Spring	S. J. Bus	·	9.8 km (6.1 mi)	MPC · JPL

back to top

== See also ==
- Meanings of minor-planet names: 2001–3000
