= List of named minor planets: 2000–2999 =

This is a partial list of named minor planets in numerical order. It contains a total of 1,000 entries as of 20 March 2026. Minor planets for which no article exist are displayed in grey color and redirect to the list of minor planets (see List of minor planets § Main index).

== From 2,000 to 2,999 ==
- 2000 Herschel
- 2001 Einstein
- 2002 Euler
- 2003 Harding
- 2004 Lexell
- 2005 Hencke
- 2006 Polonskaya
- 2007 McCuskey
- 2008 Konstitutsiya
- 2009 Voloshina
- 2010 Chebyshev
- 2011 Veteraniya
- 2012 Guo Shou-Jing
- 2013 Tucapel
- 2014 Vasilevskis
- 2015 Kachuevskaya
- 2016 Heinemann
- 2017 Wesson
- 2018 Schuster
- 2019 van Albada
- 2020 Ukko
- 2021 Poincaré
- 2022 West
- 2023 Asaph
- 2024 McLaughlin
- 2025 Nortia
- 2026 Cottrell
- 2027 Shen Guo
- 2028 Janequeo
- 2029 Binomi
- 2030 Belyaev
- 2031 BAM
- 2032 Ethel
- 2033 Basilea
- 2034 Bernoulli
- 2035 Stearns
- 2036 Sheragul
- 2037 Tripaxeptalis
- 2038 Bistro
- 2039 Payne-Gaposchkin
- 2040 Chalonge
- 2041 Lancelot
- 2042 Sitarski
- 2043 Ortutay
- 2044 Wirt
- 2045 Peking
- 2046 Leningrad
- 2047 Smetana
- 2048 Dwornik
- 2049 Grietje
- 2050 Francis
- 2051 Chang
- 2052 Tamriko
- 2053 Nuki
- 2054 Gawain
- 2055 Dvořák
- 2056 Nancy
- 2057 Rosemary
- 2058 Róka
- 2059 Baboquivari
- 2060 Chiron
- 2061 Anza
- 2062 Aten
- 2063 Bacchus
- 2064 Thomsen
- 2065 Spicer
- 2066 Palala
- 2067 Aksnes
- 2068 Dangreen
- 2069 Hubble
- 2070 Humason
- 2071 Nadezhda
- 2072 Kosmodemyanskaya
- 2073 Janáček
- 2074 Shoemaker
- 2075 Martinez
- 2076 Levin
- 2077 Kiangsu
- 2078 Nanking
- 2079 Jacchia
- 2080 Jihlava
- 2081 Sázava
- 2082 Galahad
- 2083 Smither
- 2084 Okayama
- 2085 Henan
- 2086 Newell
- 2087 Kochera
- 2088 Sahlia
- 2089 Cetacea
- 2090 Mizuho
- 2091 Sampo
- 2092 Sumiana
- 2093 Genichesk
- 2094 Magnitka
- 2095 Parsifal
- 2096 Väinö
- 2097 Galle
- 2098 Zyskin
- 2099 Öpik
- 2100 Ra-Shalom
- 2101 Adonis
- 2102 Tantalus
- 2103 Laverna
- 2104 Toronto
- 2105 Gudy
- 2106 Hugo
- 2107 Ilmari
- 2108 Otto Schmidt
- 2109 Dhôtel
- 2110 Moore-Sitterly
- 2111 Tselina
- 2112 Ulyanov
- 2113 Ehrdni
- 2114 Wallenquist
- 2115 Irakli
- 2116 Mtskheta
- 2117 Danmark
- 2118 Flagstaff
- 2119 Schwall
- 2120 Tyumenia
- 2121 Sevastopol
- 2122 Pyatiletka
- 2123 Vltava
- 2124 Nissen
- 2125 Karl-Ontjes
- 2126 Gerasimovich
- 2127 Tanya
- 2128 Wetherill
- 2129 Cosicosi
- 2130 Evdokiya
- 2131 Mayall
- 2132 Zhukov
- 2133 Franceswright
- 2134 Dennispalm
- 2135 Aristaeus
- 2136 Jugta
- 2137 Priscilla
- 2138 Swissair
- 2139 Makharadze
- 2140 Kemerovo
- 2141 Simferopol
- 2142 Landau
- 2143 Jimarnold
- 2144 Marietta
- 2145 Blaauw
- 2146 Stentor
- 2147 Kharadze
- 2148 Epeios
- 2149 Schwambraniya
- 2150 Nyctimene
- 2151 Hadwiger
- 2152 Hannibal
- 2153 Akiyama
- 2154 Underhill
- 2155 Wodan
- 2156 Kate
- 2157 Ashbrook
- 2158 Tietjen
- 2159 Kukkamäki
- 2160 Spitzer
- 2161 Grissom
- 2162 Anhui
- 2163 Korczak
- 2164 Lyalya
- 2165 Young
- 2166 Handahl
- 2167 Erin
- 2168 Swope
- 2169 Taiwan
- 2170 Byelorussia
- 2171 Kiev
- 2172 Plavsk
- 2173 Maresjev
- 2174 Asmodeus
- 2175 Andrea Doria
- 2176 Donar
- 2177 Oliver
- 2178 Kazakhstania
- 2179 Platzeck
- 2180 Marjaleena
- 2181 Fogelin
- 2182 Semirot
- 2183 Neufang
- 2184 Fujian
- 2185 Guangdong
- 2186 Keldysh
- 2187 La Silla
- 2188 Orlenok
- 2189 Zaragoza
- 2190 Coubertin
- 2191 Uppsala
- 2192 Pyatigoriya
- 2193 Jackson
- 2194 Arpola
- 2195 Tengström
- 2196 Ellicott
- 2197 Shanghai
- 2198 Ceplecha
- 2199 Kleť
- 2200 Pasadena
- 2201 Oljato
- 2202 Pele
- 2203 van Rhijn
- 2204 Lyyli
- 2205 Glinka
- 2206 Gabrova
- 2207 Antenor
- 2208 Pushkin
- 2209 Tianjin
- 2210 Lois
- 2211 Hanuman
- 2212 Hephaistos
- 2213 Meeus
- 2214 Carol
- 2215 Sichuan
- 2216 Kerch
- 2217 Eltigen
- 2218 Wotho
- 2219 Mannucci
- 2220 Hicks
- 2221 Chilton
- 2222 Lermontov
- 2223 Sarpedon
- 2224 Tucson
- 2225 Serkowski
- 2226 Cunitza
- 2227 Otto Struve
- 2228 Soyuz-Apollo
- 2229 Mezzarco
- 2230 Yunnan
- 2231 Durrell
- 2232 Altaj
- 2233 Kuznetsov
- 2234 Schmadel
- 2235 Vittore
- 2236 Austrasia
- 2237 Melnikov
- 2238 Steshenko
- 2239 Paracelsus
- 2240 Tsai
- 2241 Alcathous
- 2242 Balaton
- 2243 Lönnrot
- 2244 Tesla
- 2245 Hekatostos
- 2246 Bowell
- 2247 Hiroshima
- 2248 Kanda
- 2249 Yamamoto
- 2250 Stalingrad
- 2251 Tikhov
- 2252 CERGA
- 2253 Espinette
- 2254 Requiem
- 2255 Qinghai
- 2256 Wiśniewski
- 2257 Kaarina
- 2258 Viipuri
- 2259 Sofievka
- 2260 Neoptolemus
- 2261 Keeler
- 2262 Mitidika
- 2263 Shaanxi
- 2264 Sabrina
- 2265 Verbaandert
- 2266 Tchaikovsky
- 2267 Agassiz
- 2268 Szmytowna
- 2269 Efremiana
- 2270 Yazhi
- 2271 Kiso
- 2272 Montezuma
- 2273 Yarilo
- 2274 Ehrsson
- 2275 Cuitlahuac
- 2276 Warck
- 2277 Moreau
- 2278 Götz
- 2279 Barto
- 2280 Kunikov
- 2281 Biela
- 2282 Andrés Bello
- 2283 Bunke
- 2284 San Juan
- 2285 Ron Helin
- 2286 Fesenkov
- 2287 Kalmykia
- 2288 Karolinum
- 2289 McMillan
- 2290 Helffrich
- 2291 Kevo
- 2292 Seili
- 2293 Guernica
- 2294 Andronikov
- 2295 Matusovskij
- 2296 Kugultinov
- 2297 Daghestan
- 2298 Cindijon
- 2299 Hanko
- 2300 Stebbins
- 2301 Whitford
- 2302 Florya
- 2303 Retsina
- 2304 Slavia
- 2305 King
- 2306 Bauschinger
- 2307 Garuda
- 2308 Schilt
- 2309 Mr. Spock
- 2310 Olshaniya
- 2311 El Leoncito
- 2312 Duboshin
- 2313 Aruna
- 2314 Field
- 2315 Czechoslovakia
- 2316 Jo-Ann
- 2317 Galya
- 2318 Lubarsky
- 2319 Aristides
- 2320 Blarney
- 2321 Lužnice
- 2322 Kitt Peak
- 2323 Zverev
- 2324 Janice
- 2325 Chernykh
- 2326 Tololo
- 2327 Gershberg
- 2328 Robeson
- 2329 Orthos
- 2330 Ontake
- 2331 Parvulesco
- 2332 Kalm
- 2333 Porthan
- 2334 Cuffey
- 2335 James
- 2336 Xinjiang
- 2337 Boubín
- 2338 Bokhan
- 2339 Anacreon
- 2340 Hathor
- 2341 Aoluta
- 2342 Lebedev
- 2343 Siding Spring
- 2344 Xizang
- 2345 Fučik
- 2346 Lilio
- 2347 Vinata
- 2348 Michkovitch
- 2349 Kurchenko
- 2350 von Lüde
- 2351 O'Higgins
- 2352 Kurchatov
- 2353 Alva
- 2354 Lavrov
- 2355 Nei Monggol
- 2356 Hirons
- 2357 Phereclos
- 2358 Bahner
- 2359 Debehogne
- 2360 Volgo-Don
- 2361 Gogol
- 2362 Mark Twain
- 2363 Cebriones
- 2364 Seillier
- 2365 Interkosmos
- 2366 Aaryn
- 2367 Praha
- 2368 Beltrovata
- 2369 Chekhov
- 2370 van Altena
- 2371 Dimitrov
- 2372 Proskurin
- 2373 Immo
- 2374 Vladvysotskij
- 2375 Radek
- 2376 Martynov
- 2377 Shcheglov
- 2378 Pannekoek
- 2379 Heiskanen
- 2380 Heilongjiang
- 2381 Landi
- 2382 Nonie
- 2383 Bradley
- 2384 Schulhof
- 2385 Mustel
- 2386 Nikonov
- 2387 Xi'an
- 2388 Gaze
- 2389 Dibaj
- 2390 Nežárka
- 2391 Tomita
- 2392 Jonathan Murray
- 2393 Suzuki
- 2394 Nadeev
- 2395 Aho
- 2396 Kochi
- 2397 Lappajärvi
- 2398 Jilin
- 2399 Terradas
- 2400 Derevskaya
- 2401 Aehlita
- 2402 Satpaev
- 2403 Šumava
- 2404 Antarctica
- 2405 Welch
- 2406 Orelskaya
- 2407 Haug
- 2408 Astapovich
- 2409 Chapman
- 2410 Morrison
- 2411 Zellner
- 2412 Wil
- 2413 van de Hulst
- 2414 Vibeke
- 2415 Ganesa
- 2416 Sharonov
- 2417 McVittie
- 2418 Voskovec-Werich
- 2419 Moldavia
- 2420 Čiurlionis
- 2421 Nininger
- 2422 Perovskaya
- 2423 Ibarruri
- 2424 Tautenburg
- 2425 Shenzhen
- 2426 Simonov
- 2427 Kobzar
- 2428 Kamenyar
- 2429 Schürer
- 2430 Bruce Helin
- 2431 Skovoroda
- 2432 Soomana
- 2433 Sootiyo
- 2434 Bateson
- 2435 Horemheb
- 2436 Hatshepsut
- 2437 Amnestia
- 2438 Oleshko
- 2439 Ulugbek
- 2440 Educatio
- 2441 Hibbs
- 2442 Corbett
- 2443 Tomeileen
- 2444 Lederle
- 2445 Blazhko
- 2446 Lunacharsky
- 2447 Kronstadt
- 2448 Sholokhov
- 2449 Kenos
- 2450 Ioannisiani
- 2451 Dollfus
- 2452 Lyot
- 2453 Wabash
- 2454 Olaus Magnus
- 2455 Somville
- 2456 Palamedes
- 2457 Rublyov
- 2458 Veniakaverin
- 2459 Spellmann
- 2460 Mitlincoln
- 2461 Clavel
- 2462 Nehalennia
- 2463 Sterpin
- 2464 Nordenskiöld
- 2465 Wilson
- 2466 Golson
- 2467 Kollontai
- 2468 Repin
- 2469 Tadjikistan
- 2470 Agematsu
- 2471 Ultrajectum
- 2472 Bradman
- 2473 Heyerdahl
- 2474 Ruby
- 2475 Semenov
- 2476 Andersen
- 2477 Biryukov
- 2478 Tokai
- 2479 Sodankylä
- 2480 Papanov
- 2481 Bürgi
- 2482 Perkin
- 2483 Guinevere
- 2484 Parenago
- 2485 Scheffler
- 2486 Metsähovi
- 2487 Juhani
- 2488 Bryan
- 2489 Suvorov
- 2490 Bussolini
- 2491 Tvashtri
- 2492 Kutuzov
- 2493 Elmer
- 2494 Inge
- 2495 Noviomagum
- 2496 Fernandus
- 2497 Kulikovskij
- 2498 Tsesevich
- 2499 Brunk
- 2500 Alascattalo
- 2501 Lohja
- 2502 Nummela
- 2503 Liaoning
- 2504 Gaviola
- 2505 Hebei
- 2506 Pirogov
- 2507 Bobone
- 2508 Alupka
- 2509 Chukotka
- 2510 Shandong
- 2511 Patterson
- 2512 Tavastia
- 2513 Baetslé
- 2514 Taiyuan
- 2515 Gansu
- 2516 Roman
- 2517 Orma
- 2518 Rutllant
- 2519 Annagerman
- 2520 Novorossijsk
- 2521 Heidi
- 2522 Triglav
- 2523 Ryba
- 2524 Budovicium
- 2525 O'Steen
- 2526 Alisary
- 2527 Gregory
- 2528 Mohler
- 2529 Rockwell Kent
- 2530 Shipka
- 2531 Cambridge
- 2532 Sutton
- 2533 Fechtig
- 2534 Houzeau
- 2535 Hämeenlinna
- 2536 Kozyrev
- 2537 Gilmore
- 2538 Vanderlinden
- 2539 Ningxia
- 2540 Blok
- 2541 Edebono
- 2542 Calpurnia
- 2543 Machado
- 2544 Gubarev
- 2545 Verbiest
- 2546 Libitina
- 2547 Hubei
- 2548 Leloir
- 2549 Baker
- 2550 Houssay
- 2551 Decabrina
- 2552 Remek
- 2553 Viljev
- 2554 Skiff
- 2555 Thomas
- 2556 Louise
- 2557 Putnam
- 2558 Viv
- 2559 Svoboda
- 2560 Siegma
- 2561 Margolin
- 2562 Chaliapin
- 2563 Boyarchuk
- 2564 Kayala
- 2565 Grögler
- 2566 Kirghizia
- 2567 Elba
- 2568 Maksutov
- 2569 Madeline
- 2570 Porphyro
- 2571 Geisei
- 2572 Annschnell
- 2573 Hannu Olavi
- 2574 Ladoga
- 2575 Bulgaria
- 2576 Yesenin
- 2577 Litva
- 2578 Saint-Exupéry
- 2579 Spartacus
- 2580 Smilevskia
- 2581 Radegast
- 2582 Harimaya-Bashi
- 2583 Fatyanov
- 2584 Turkmenia
- 2585 Irpedina
- 2586 Matson
- 2587 Gardner
- 2588 Flavia
- 2589 Daniel
- 2590 Mourão
- 2591 Dworetsky
- 2592 Hunan
- 2593 Buryatia
- 2594 Acamas
- 2595 Gudiachvili
- 2596 Vainu Bappu
- 2597 Arthur
- 2598 Merlin
- 2599 Veselí
- 2600 Lumme
- 2601 Bologna
- 2602 Moore
- 2603 Taylor
- 2604 Marshak
- 2605 Sahade
- 2606 Odessa
- 2607 Yakutia
- 2608 Seneca
- 2609 Kiril-Metodi
- 2610 Tuva
- 2611 Boyce
- 2612 Kathryn
- 2613 Plzeň
- 2614 Torrence
- 2615 Saito
- 2616 Lesya
- 2617 Jiangxi
- 2618 Coonabarabran
- 2619 Skalnaté Pleso
- 2620 Santana
- 2621 Goto
- 2622 Bolzano
- 2623 Zech
- 2624 Samitchell
- 2625 Jack London
- 2626 Belnika
- 2627 Churyumov
- 2628 Kopal
- 2629 Rudra
- 2630 Hermod
- 2631 Zhejiang
- 2632 Guizhou
- 2633 Bishop
- 2634 James Bradley
- 2635 Huggins
- 2636 Lassell
- 2637 Bobrovnikoff
- 2638 Gadolin
- 2639 Planman
- 2640 Hällström
- 2641 Lipschutz
- 2642 Vésale
- 2643 Bernhard
- 2644 Victor Jara
- 2645 Daphne Plane
- 2646 Abetti
- 2647 Sova
- 2648 Owa
- 2649 Oongaq
- 2650 Elinor
- 2651 Karen
- 2652 Yabuuti
- 2653 Principia
- 2654 Ristenpart
- 2655 Guangxi
- 2656 Evenkia
- 2657 Bashkiria
- 2658 Gingerich
- 2659 Millis
- 2660 Wasserman
- 2661 Bydžovský
- 2662 Kandinsky
- 2663 Miltiades
- 2664 Everhart
- 2665 Schrutka
- 2666 Gramme
- 2667 Oikawa
- 2668 Tataria
- 2669 Shostakovich
- 2670 Chuvashia
- 2671 Abkhazia
- 2672 Písek
- 2673 Lossignol
- 2674 Pandarus
- 2675 Tolkien
- 2676 Aarhus
- 2677 Joan
- 2678 Aavasaksa
- 2679 Kittisvaara
- 2680 Mateo
- 2681 Ostrovskij
- 2682 Soromundi
- 2683 Brian
- 2684 Douglas
- 2685 Masursky
- 2686 Linda Susan
- 2687 Tortali
- 2688 Halley
- 2689 Bruxelles
- 2690 Ristiina
- 2691 Sérsic
- 2692 Chkalov
- 2693 Yan'an
- 2694 Pino Torinese
- 2695 Christabel
- 2696 Magion
- 2697 Albina
- 2698 Azerbajdzhan
- 2699 Kalinin
- 2700 Baikonur
- 2701 Cherson
- 2702 Batrakov
- 2703 Rodari
- 2704 Julian Loewe
- 2705 Wu
- 2706 Borovský
- 2707 Ueferji
- 2708 Burns
- 2709 Sagan
- 2710 Veverka
- 2711 Aleksandrov
- 2712 Keaton
- 2713 Luxembourg
- 2714 Matti
- 2715 Mielikki
- 2716 Tuulikki
- 2717 Tellervo
- 2718 Handley
- 2719 Suzhou
- 2720 Pyotr Pervyj
- 2721 Vsekhsvyatskij
- 2722 Abalakin
- 2723 Gorshkov
- 2724 Orlov
- 2725 David Bender
- 2726 Kotelnikov
- 2727 Paton
- 2728 Yatskiv
- 2729 Urumqi
- 2730 Barks
- 2731 Cucula
- 2732 Witt
- 2733 Hamina
- 2734 Hašek
- 2735 Ellen
- 2736 Ops
- 2737 Kotka
- 2738 Viracocha
- 2739 Taguacipa
- 2740 Tsoj
- 2741 Valdivia
- 2742 Gibson
- 2743 Chengdu
- 2744 Birgitta
- 2745 San Martín
- 2746 Hissao
- 2747 Český Krumlov
- 2748 Patrick Gene
- 2749 Walterhorn
- 2750 Loviisa
- 2751 Campbell
- 2752 Wu Chien-Shiung
- 2753 Duncan
- 2754 Efimov
- 2755 Avicenna
- 2756 Dzhangar
- 2757 Crisser
- 2758 Cordelia
- 2759 Idomeneus
- 2760 Kacha
- 2761 Eddington
- 2762 Fowler
- 2763 Jeans
- 2764 Moeller
- 2765 Dinant
- 2766 Leeuwenhoek
- 2767 Takenouchi
- 2768 Gorky
- 2769 Mendeleev
- 2770 Tsvet
- 2771 Polzunov
- 2772 Dugan
- 2773 Brooks
- 2774 Tenojoki
- 2775 Odishaw
- 2776 Baikal
- 2777 Shukshin
- 2778 Tangshan
- 2779 Mary
- 2780 Monnig
- 2781 Kleczek
- 2782 Leonidas
- 2783 Chernyshevskij
- 2784 Domeyko
- 2785 Sedov
- 2786 Grinevia
- 2787 Tovarishch
- 2788 Andenne
- 2789 Foshan
- 2790 Needham
- 2791 Paradise
- 2792 Ponomarev
- 2793 Valdaj
- 2794 Kulik
- 2795 Lepage
- 2796 Kron
- 2797 Teucer
- 2798 Vergilius
- 2799 Justus
- 2800 Ovidius
- 2801 Huygens
- 2802 Weisell
- 2803 Vilho
- 2804 Yrjö
- 2805 Kalle
- 2806 Graz
- 2807 Karl Marx
- 2808 Belgrano
- 2809 Vernadskij
- 2810 Lev Tolstoj
- 2811 Střemchoví
- 2812 Scaltriti
- 2813 Zappalà
- 2814 Vieira
- 2815 Soma
- 2816 Pien
- 2817 Perec
- 2818 Juvenalis
- 2819 Ensor
- 2820 Iisalmi
- 2821 Slávka
- 2822 Sacajawea
- 2823 van der Laan
- 2824 Franke
- 2825 Crosby
- 2826 Ahti
- 2827 Vellamo
- 2828 Iku-Turso
- 2829 Bobhope
- 2830 Greenwich
- 2831 Stevin
- 2832 Lada
- 2833 Radishchev
- 2834 Christy Carol
- 2835 Ryoma
- 2836 Sobolev
- 2837 Griboedov
- 2838 Takase
- 2839 Annette
- 2840 Kallavesi
- 2841 Puijo
- 2842 Unsöld
- 2843 Yeti
- 2844 Hess
- 2845 Franklinken
- 2846 Ylppö
- 2847 Parvati
- 2848 ASP
- 2849 Shklovskij
- 2850 Mozhaiskij
- 2851 Harbin
- 2852 Declercq
- 2853 Harvill
- 2854 Rawson
- 2855 Bastian
- 2856 Röser
- 2857 NOT
- 2858 Carlosporter
- 2859 Paganini
- 2860 Pasacentennium
- 2861 Lambrecht
- 2862 Vavilov
- 2863 Ben Mayer
- 2864 Soderblom
- 2865 Laurel
- 2866 Hardy
- 2867 Šteins
- 2868 Upupa
- 2869 Nepryadva
- 2870 Haupt
- 2871 Schober
- 2872 Gentelec
- 2873 Binzel
- 2874 Jim Young
- 2875 Lagerkvist
- 2876 Aeschylus
- 2877 Likhachev
- 2878 Panacea
- 2879 Shimizu
- 2880 Nihondaira
- 2881 Meiden
- 2882 Tedesco
- 2883 Barabashov
- 2884 Reddish
- 2885 Palva
- 2886 Tinkaping
- 2887 Krinov
- 2888 Hodgson
- 2889 Brno
- 2890 Vilyujsk
- 2891 McGetchin
- 2892 Filipenko
- 2893 Peiroos
- 2894 Kakhovka
- 2895 Memnon
- 2896 Preiss
- 2897 Ole Römer
- 2898 Neuvo
- 2899 Runrun Shaw
- 2900 Luboš Perek
- 2901 Bagehot
- 2902 Westerlund
- 2903 Zhuhai
- 2904 Millman
- 2905 Plaskett
- 2906 Caltech
- 2907 Nekrasov
- 2908 Shimoyama
- 2909 Hoshi-no-ie
- 2910 Yoshkar-Ola
- 2911 Miahelena
- 2912 Lapalma
- 2913 Horta
- 2914 Glärnisch
- 2915 Moskvina
- 2916 Voronveliya
- 2917 Sawyer Hogg
- 2918 Salazar
- 2919 Dali
- 2920 Automedon
- 2921 Sophocles
- 2922 Dikanʹka
- 2923 Schuyler
- 2924 Mitake-mura
- 2925 Beatty
- 2926 Caldeira
- 2927 Alamosa
- 2928 Epstein
- 2929 Harris
- 2930 Euripides
- 2931 Mayakovsky
- 2932 Kempchinsky
- 2933 Amber
- 2934 Aristophanes
- 2935 Naerum
- 2936 Nechvíle
- 2937 Gibbs
- 2938 Hopi
- 2939 Coconino
- 2940 Bacon
- 2941 Alden
- 2942 Cordie
- 2943 Heinrich
- 2944 Peyo
- 2945 Zanstra
- 2946 Muchachos
- 2947 Kippenhahn
- 2948 Amosov
- 2949 Kaverznev
- 2950 Rousseau
- 2951 Perepadin
- 2952 Lilliputia
- 2953 Vysheslavia
- 2954 Delsemme
- 2955 Newburn
- 2956 Yeomans
- 2957 Tatsuo
- 2958 Arpetito
- 2959 Scholl
- 2960 Ohtaki
- 2961 Katsurahama
- 2962 Otto
- 2963 Chen Jiageng
- 2964 Jaschek
- 2965 Surikov
- 2966 Korsunia
- 2967 Vladisvyat
- 2968 Iliya
- 2969 Mikula
- 2970 Pestalozzi
- 2971 Mohr
- 2972 Niilo
- 2973 Paola
- 2974 Holden
- 2975 Spahr
- 2976 Lautaro
- 2977 Chivilikhin
- 2978 Roudebush
- 2979 Murmansk
- 2980 Cameron
- 2981 Chagall
- 2982 Muriel
- 2983 Poltava
- 2984 Chaucer
- 2985 Shakespeare
- 2986 Mrinalini
- 2987 Sarabhai
- 2988 Korhonen
- 2989 Imago
- 2990 Trimberger
- 2991 Bilbo
- 2992 Vondel
- 2993 Wendy
- 2994 Flynn
- 2995 Taratuta
- 2996 Bowman
- 2997 Cabrera
- 2998 Berendeya
- 2999 Dante
back to top

== See also ==
- List of minor planet discoverers
- List of observatory codes
- Meanings of minor planet names § Index
