= List of named minor planets: V =

This is a partial list of named minor planets, containing all those starting with the letter V, as of 9 November 2026. It is ordered in a case-insensitive, alphabetical manner and contains a total of 698 entries. Grey minor planets have no article and redirect to the list of minor planets instead (see List of minor planets § Main index).

== V ==
- 13474 Vʹyus
- 1507 Vaasa
- 20343 Vaccariello
- 7600 Vacchi
- 49698 Váchal
- 230151 Vachier
- 8740 Václav
- 18647 Václavhübner
- 80179 Václavknoll
- 33061 Václavmorava
- 21804 Václavneumann
- 85516 Vaclík
- 10872 Vaculík
- 10263 Vadimsimona
- 603562 Vadimsouley
- 383508 Vadrot
- 36340 Vaduvescu
- 7529 Vagnozzi
- 68853 Vaimaca
- 2096 Väinö
- 22957 Vaintrob
- 2596 Vainu Bappu
- 1573 Väisälä
- 25636 Vaishnav
- 28184 Vaishnavirao
- 16892 Vaissière
- 846464 Vaižgantas
- 622006 Vákárlajos
- 131 Vala
- 6937 Valadon
- 338274 Valančius
- 552750 Valasek
- 839 Valborg
- 25018 Valbousquet
- 23115 Valcourt
- 262 Valda
- 2793 Valdaj
- 2741 Valdivia
- 113620 Valelucarotti
- 217257 Valemangano
- 5941 Valencia
- 10015 Valenlebedev
- 8409 Valentaugustus
- 447 Valentine
- 646626 Valentingrigore
- 611 Valeria
- 27392 Valerieding
- 20755 Valériegodard
- 13325 Valérienataf
- 29800 Valeriesarge
- 198989 Valeriethomas
- 114611 Valeriobocci
- 10741 Valeriocarruba
- 151280 Valeriorizzo
- 145820 Valeromeo
- 17402 Valeryshuvalov
- 610 Valeska
- 79375 Valetti
- 18969 Valfriedmann
- 4537 Valgrirasp
- 28673 Valholmes
- 4328 Valina
- 24601 Valjean
- 335853 Valléedaoste
- 225076 Vallemare
- 10454 Vallenar
- 15004 Vallerani
- 27088 Valmez
- 37623 Valmiera
- 34026 Valpagliarino
- 88961 Valpertile
- 3725 Valsecchi
- 9733 Valtikhonov
- 8145 Valujki
- 43025 Valusha
- 3962 Valyaev
- 425509 Valyavin
- 185196 Vámbéry
- 9372 Vamlingbo
- 155215 Vámostibor
- 3230 Vampilov
- 34978 van 't Hoff
- 38828 van 't Leven
- 2019 van Albada
- 2370 van Altena
- 28408 van Baalen
- 25155 van Belle
- 1781 Van Biesbroeck
- 41049 Van Citters
- 29244 Van Damme
- 2413 van de Hulst
- 1965 van de Kamp
- 10753 van de Velde
- 427496 van de Weg
- 4230 van den Bergh
- 10074 Van den Berghe
- 1663 van den Bos
- 9749 Van den Eijnde
- 3091 van den Heuvel
- 10963 van der Brugge
- 10966 van der Hucht
- 12653 van der Klis
- 10437 van der Kruit
- 2823 van der Laan
- 12942 van der Marel
- 9678 van der Meer
- 10443 van der Pol
- 32893 van der Waals
- 9576 van der Weyden
- 5916 van der Woude
- 8205 Van Dijck
- 10971 van Dishoeck
- 7059 Van Dokkum
- 26200 Van Doren
- 9561 van Eyck
- 52266 Van Flandern
- 14616 Van Gaal
- 6751 van Genderen
- 1666 van Gent
- 4457 van Gogh
- 1752 van Herk
- 12174 van het Reve
- 1673 van Houten
- 10965 van Leverink
- 9859 Van Lierde
- 10651 van Linschoten
- 10667 van Marxveldt
- 26293 Van Muyden
- 14185 Van Ness
- 9748 van Ostaijen
- 24679 Van Rensbergen
- 2203 van Rhijn
- 9239 van Riebeeck
- 10441 van Rijckevorsel
- 12324 Van Rompaey
- 18643 van Rysselberghe
- 10439 van Schooten
- 19235 van Schurman
- 25832 Van Scoyoc
- 3098 van Sprang
- 12708 Van Straten
- 10440 van Swinden
- 152233 Van Till
- 230691 Van Vogt
- 22907 van Voorthuijsen
- 33976 Van Wal
- 10429 van Woerden
- 4296 van Woerkom
- 8320 van Zee
- 23738 van Zyl
- 240 Vanadis
- 152299 Vanautgaerden
- 6404 Vanavara
- 129595 Vand
- 70942 Vandanashiva
- 38829 Vandeputte
- 2538 Vanderlinden
- 315579 Vandersyppe
- 14664 Vandervelden
- 10313 Vanessa-Mae
- 17880 Vanessaparker
- 19484 Vanessaspini
- 10794 Vänge
- 6354 Vangelis
- 13523 Vanhassel
- 40684 Vanhoeck
- 32598 Vanialorenzi
- 8604 Vanier
- 8370 Vanlindt
- 340071 Vanmunster
- 3401 Vanphilos
- 17980 Vanschaik
- 157396 Vansevičius
- 17247 Vanverst
- 8386 Vanvinckenroye
- 12170 Vanvollenhoven
- 6426 Vanýsek
- 71539 VanZandt
- 769288 Varadinagypal
- 174567 Varda
- 21649 Vardhana
- 19023 Varela
- 277816 Varese
- 29133 Vargas
- 17466 Vargasllosa
- 11828 Vargha
- 29952 Varghese
- 413233 Várkonyiágnes
- 28479 Varlotta
- 510466 Varna
- 100029 Varnhagen
- 53468 Varros
- 1263 Varsavia
- 3776 Vartiovuori
- 27525 Vartovka
- 20000 Varuna
- 27597 Varuniyer
- 10640 Varunkumar
- 34346 Varunmadan
- 33602 Varunmandi
- 29122 Vasadze
- 5801 Vasarely
- 216757 Vasari
- 33680 Vasconcelos
- 17163 Vasifedoseev
- 34890 Vasikaran
- 11816 Vasile
- 783839 Vasilechirila
- 24604 Vasilermakov
- 3930 Vasilev
- 2014 Vasilevskis
- 9184 Vasilij
- 6547 Vasilkarazin
- 310222 Vasipetropoulou
- 21652 Vasishtha
- 16513 Vasks
- 3586 Vasnetsov
- 25051 Vass
- 1312 Vassar
- 378920 Vassimre
- 15311 Västerberg
- 10554 Västerhejde
- 28636 Vasudevan
- 332084 Vasyakulbeda
- 546186 Vasylivchenko
- 17034 Vasylshev
- 12312 Väte
- 416 Vaticana
- 39529 Vatnajökull
- 196481 VATT
- 82896 Vaubaillon
- 16447 Vauban
- 10927 Vaucluse
- 4462 Vaughan
- 72876 Vauriot
- 28118 Vaux
- 2862 Vavilov
- 3732 Vávra
- 7595 Växjö
- 347028 Važec
- 21500 Vazquez
- 27032 Veazey
- 31665 Veblen
- 33377 Večerníček
- 4962 Vecherka
- 25834 Vechinski
- 25708 Vedantkumar
- 7996 Vedernikov
- 176014 Vedrana
- 9883 Veecas
- 3510 Veeder
- 34272 Veeramacheneni
- 390848 Veerle
- 20757 Veerlesterken
- 3030 Vehrenberg
- 16984 Veillet
- 4996 Veisberg
- 28614 Vejvoda
- 128426 Vekerdi
- 20719 Velasco
- 155438 Velásquez
- 38684 Velehrad
- 21660 Velenia
- 4338 Velez
- 17035 Velichko
- 3601 Velikhov
- 11480 Velikij Ustyug
- 3112 Velimir
- 11475 Velinský
- 2827 Vellamo
- 126 Velleda
- 212374 Vellerat
- 27320 Vellinga
- 303710 Velpeau
- 9492 Veltman
- 32087 Vemulapalli
- 13717 Vencill
- 45752 Venditti
- 487 Venetia
- 9357 Venezuela
- 34147 Vengadesan
- 2458 Veniakaverin
- 4740 Veniamina
- 4366 Venikagan
- 16214 Venkatachalam
- 34387 Venkatesh
- 28438 Venkateswaran
- 34752 Venkatkrishnan
- 16215 Venkatraman
- 550139 Venn
- 10925 Ventoux
- 4825 Ventura
- 16219 Venturelli
- 34409 Venturini
- 499 Venusia
- 7555 Venvolkov
- 350509 Vepřoknedlozelo
- 245 Vera
- 10875 Veracini
- 26857 Veracruz
- 4214 Veralynn
- 20758 Veras
- 4683 Veratar
- 2265 Verbaandert
- 3883 Verbano
- 170879 Verbeeckje
- 2545 Verbiest
- 9726 Verbiscer
- 7451 Verbitskaya
- 52963 Vercingetorix
- 38671 Verdaguer
- 25625 Verdenet
- 157599 Verdery
- 3975 Verdi
- 12288 Verdun
- 3551 Verenia
- 3410 Vereshchagin
- 5659 Vergara
- 2798 Vergilius
- 12697 Verhaeren
- 618132 Verheyen
- 84225 Verish
- 490 Veritas
- 155116 Verkhivnya
- 9155 Verkhodanov
- 18287 Verkin
- 783963 Verkkoniemi
- 28366 Verkuil
- 6871 Verlaine
- 20798 Verlinden
- 31886 Verlisak
- 31437 Verma
- 13045 Vermandere
- 4928 Vermeer
- 7974 Vermeesch
- 11846 Verminnen
- 2809 Vernadskij
- 20607 Vernazza
- 5231 Verne
- 6518 Vernon
- 5317 Verolacqua
- 4335 Verona
- 204570 Veronicabray
- 24028 Veronicaduys
- 612 Veronika
- 56172 Véroniquesanson
- 6105 Verrocchio
- 6268 Versailles
- 12630 Verstappen
- 197525 Versteeg
- 485320 Vértesernő
- 307761 Vérteslászló
- 3669 Vertinskij
- 4206 Verulamium
- 20465 Vervack
- 3974 Verveer
- 10992 Veryuslaviya
- 2642 Vésale
- 2599 Veselí
- 7457 Veselov
- 27344 Vesevlada
- 8719 Vesmír
- 7224 Vesnina
- 6062 Vespa
- 31319 Vespucci
- 4 Vesta
- 13897 Vesuvius
- 13479 Vet
- 2011 Veteraniya
- 18377 Vetter
- 4800 Veveri
- 2710 Veverka
- 15382 Vian
- 20071 Viareggio
- 2414 Vibeke
- 3269 Vibert-Douglas
- 25290 Vibhuti
- 144 Vibilia
- 13607 Vicars
- 78071 Vicent
- 1097 Vicia
- 37601 Vicjen
- 13002 Vickihorner
- 7237 Vickyhamilton
- 183114 Vicques
- 202740 Vicsympho
- 2644 Victor Jara
- 34280 Victoradler
- 9550 Victorblanco
- 5634 Victorborge
- 24450 Victorchang
- 361530 Victorfranzhess
- 12 Victoria
- 255073 Victoriabond
- 17149 Victoriagraf
- 110294 Victoriaharbour
- 19234 Victoriahibbs
- 11725 Victoriahsu
- 16026 Victoriapidgeon
- 21453 Victorlevine
- 7267 Victormeen
- 28683 Victorostrik
- 3237 Victorplatt
- 121716 Victorsank
- 21622 Victorshia
- 210294 Vidal
- 44456 Vidal-Madjar
- 9728 Videen
- 5165 Videnom
- 22617 Vidphananu
- 214911 Viehböck
- 2814 Vieira
- 34645 Vieiramartins
- 34587 Vieiraneto
- 397 Vienna
- 20759 Vienne
- 233967 Vierkant
- 31823 Viète
- 6966 Vietoris
- 40007 Vieuxtemps
- 1053 Vigdis
- 6151 Viget
- 17278 Viggh
- 127870 Vigo
- 813826 Vihart
- 1478 Vihuri
- 11815 Viikinkoski
- 2258 Viipuri
- 17125 Vijayakumar
- 23281 Vijayjain
- 5220 Vika
- 19082 Vikchernov
- 466552 Viking
- 5252 Vikrymov
- 7856 Viktorbykov
- 11736 Viktorfischl
- 17176 Viktorov
- 46539 Viktortikhonov
- 633570 Viktorzagainov
- 32226 Vikulgupta
- 23410 Vikuznetsov
- 18731 Vilʹbakirov
- 256369 Vilain
- 26295 Vilardi
- 3507 Vilas
- 4514 Vilen
- 14833 Vilenius
- 98127 Vilgusová
- 34604 Vilhena
- 2803 Vilho
- 2553 Viljev
- 7244 Villa-Lobos
- 16696 Villamayor
- 9724 Villanueva
- 22840 Villarreal
- 85559 Villecroze
- 18636 Villedepompey
- 7651 Villeneuve
- 52655 Villermaux
- 1310 Villigera
- 10140 Villon
- 266081 Villyket
- 3072 Vilnius
- 2890 Vilyujsk
- 84566 VIMS
- 2347 Vinata
- 21644 Vinay
- 70782 Vinceelliott
- 510045 Vincematteo
- 152733 Vincenclesný
- 34846 Vincent
- 9476 Vincenthuang
- 366 Vincentina
- 9299 Vinceteri
- 154991 Vinciguerra
- 231 Vindobona
- 17935 Vinhoward
- 759 Vinifera
- 24104 Vinissac
- 34271 Vinjaivale
- 18924 Vinjamoori
- 113214 Vinkó
- 694357 Vîntdevară
- 1544 Vinterhansenia
- 1076 Viola
- 9173 Viola Castello
- 7922 Violalaurenti
- 30049 Violamocz
- 133142 Violapiciu
- 3559 Violaumayer
- 27004 Violetaparra
- 557 Violetta
- 9421 Violilla
- 13251 Viot
- 7464 Vipera
- 2738 Viracocha
- 547599 Virághalmy
- 13084 Virchow
- 26935 Vireday
- 14186 Virgiliofos
- 91212 Virgiliogonano
- 6862 Virgiliomarcon
- 733086 Virgiliupop
- 11569 Virgilsmith
- 50 Virginia
- 16276 Virginiama
- 19173 Virginiaterése
- 20993 Virginiediscry
- 5369 Virgiugum
- 8774 Viridis
- 10278 Virkki
- 30129 Virmani
- 1449 Virtanen
- 435127 Virtelpro
- 1887 Virton
- 494 Virtus
- 444562 Visaginas
- 6102 Visby
- 13500 Viscardy
- 9610 Vischer
- 6183 Viscome
- 36033 Viseggi
- 438829 Visena
- 4919 Vishnevskaya
- 4034 Vishnu
- 8068 Vishnureddy
- 30061 Vishnushankar
- 4538 Vishyanand
- 9244 Višnjan
- 16689 Vistula
- 34496 Viswanath
- 17932 Viswanathan
- 33814 Viswesh
- 5368 Vitagliano
- 13492 Vitalijzakharov
- 400673 Vitapolunina
- 16112 Vitaris
- 264061 Vitebsk
- 30253 Vítek
- 8132 Vitginzburg
- 1030 Vitja
- 374131 Vitkauskas
- 20044 Vitoux
- 2235 Vittore
- 79996 Vittoria
- 12814 Vittorio
- 5326 Vittoriosacco
- 398045 Vitudurum
- 15732 Vitusbering
- 17356 Vityazev
- 2558 Viv
- 4330 Vivaldi
- 324925 Vivantdenon
- 19420 Vivekbuch
- 11363 Vives
- 1623 Vivian
- 27748 Vivianhoette
- 24318 Vivianlee
- 32086 Viviannetu
- 25824 Viviantsang
- 22192 Vivienreuter
- 3260 Vizbor
- 418891 Vizi
- 19504 Vladalekseev
- 10031 Vladarnolda
- 22254 Vladbarmin
- 6774 Vladheinrich
- 10459 Vladichaika
- 10023 Vladifedorov
- 1724 Vladimir
- 656064 Vladimirasmolov
- 400881 Vladimírdolinay
- 10728 Vladimirfock
- 10324 Vladimirov
- 3591 Vladimirskij
- 365250 Vladimirsurdin
- 10266 Vladishukhov
- 182590 Vladisvujnovic
- 2967 Vladisvyat
- 471109 Vladobahýl
- 18285 Vladplatonov
- 814147 Vladturcu
- 4144 Vladvasilʹev
- 2374 Vladvysotskij
- 7153 Vladzakharov
- 270584 Vlasta
- 2123 Vltava
- 216910 Vnukov
- 10649 VOC
- 9634 Vodice
- 44885 Vodička
- 4851 Vodopʹyanova
- 62071 Voegtli
- 11762 Vogel
- 170023 Vogeley
- 10952 Vogelsberg
- 9910 Vogelweide
- 1439 Vogtia
- 5616 Vogtland
- 4378 Voigt
- 4475 Voitkevich
- 333508 Voiture
- 125371 Vojáček
- 5397 Vojislava
- 6161 Vojno-Yasenetsky
- 5425 Vojtěch
- 7631 Vokrouhlický
- 14077 Volfango
- 1149 Volga
- 2360 Volgo-Don
- 6189 Völk
- 379155 Volkerheinrich
- 3703 Volkonskaya
- 1790 Volkov
- 11056 Volland
- 5163 Vollmayr-Lee
- 469748 Volnay
- 1380 Volodia
- 6684 Volodshevchenko
- 7633 Volodymyr
- 4921 Volonté
- 13009 Voloshchuk
- 2009 Voloshina
- 445308 Volov
- 16701 Volpe
- 8208 Volta
- 5676 Voltaire
- 14072 Volterra
- 100028 von Canstein
- 27764 von Flüe
- 85195 von Helfta
- 58215 von Klitzing
- 73700 von Kues
- 10762 von Laue
- 69286 von Liebig
- 2350 von Lüde
- 9816 von Matt
- 22824 von Neumann
- 22788 von Steuben
- 12799 von Suttner
- 35087 von Sydow
- 274928 von Weinberg
- 15570 von Wolff
- 15343 Von Wohlgemuth
- 48529 von Wrangel
- 23265 von Wurden
- 8870 von Zeipel
- 2992 Vondel
- 17963 Vonderheydt
- 17251 Vondracek
- 35356 Vondrák
- 180367 VonFeldt
- 25399 Vonnegut
- 266725 Vonputtkamer
- 17253 VonSecker
- 30850 Vonsiemens
- 8639 Vonšovský
- 19822 Vonzielonka
- 6332 Vorarlberg
- 175208 Vorbourg
- 118172 Vorgebirge
- 4858 Vorobjov
- 4519 Voronezh
- 3971 Voronikhin
- 12191 Vorontsova
- 2916 Voronveliya
- 172593 Vörösmarty
- 10049 Vorovich
- 31628 Vorperian
- 10956 Vosges
- 2418 Voskovec-Werich
- 32766 Voskresenskoe
- 262705 Vosne-Romanée
- 16749 Vospini
- 23473 Voss
- 210174 Vossenkuhl
- 25615 Votroubek
- 259905 Vougeot
- 19306 Voves
- 61400 Voxandreae
- 9006 Voytkevych
- 3723 Voznesenskij
- 274333 Voznyukigor
- 14467 Vranckx
- 6379 Vrba
- 6086 Vrchlický
- 10256 Vredevoogd
- 287374 Vreeland
- 33396 Vrindamadan
- 20604 Vrishikpatil
- 2721 Vsekhsvyatskij
- 27079 Vsetín
- 8475 Vsevoivanov
- 17170 Vsevustinov
- 4464 Vulcano
- 4611 Vulkaneifel
- 162001 Vulpius
- 635 Vundtia
- 21290 Vydra
- 859641 Vydūnas
- 2953 Vysheslavia
- 6536 Vysochinska
- 121089 Vyšší Brod
- 1600 Vyssotsky
- 321324 Vytautas
back to top

== See also ==
- List of minor planet discoverers
- List of observatory codes
- Meanings of minor planet names § Index
