= 58097 Alimov =

Main-belt asteroid

Discovery
- Discovered by: T. Smirnova
- Discovery site: Crimean Astrophysical Obs.
- Discovery date: 26 October 1976

Designations
- Named after: Alexandr Alímov (Russian ecologist)
- Alternative designations: 1976 UQ_{1} · 1976 WO; 2001 TE_{43}
- Minor planet category: main-belt · (middle) background

Orbital characteristics
- Epoch 4 September 2017 (JD 2458000.5)
- Uncertainty parameter 0
- Observation arc: 39.71 yr (14,505 days)
- Aphelion: 3.2371 AU
- Perihelion: 1.8969 AU
- Semi-major axis: 2.5670 AU
- Eccentricity: 0.2610
- Orbital period (sidereal): 4.11 yr (1,502 days)
- Mean anomaly: 328.57°
- Mean motion: 0° 14^{m} 22.56^{s} / day
- Inclination: 12.925°
- Longitude of ascending node: 34.267°
- Argument of perihelion: 11.288°

Physical characteristics
- Mean diameter: 3.67 km (calculated); 3.910±0.040 km 4.009±0.047 km
- Synodic rotation period: 78.1729±0.3152 h
- Geometric albedo: 0.136±0.026; 0.1524±0.0237; 0.20 (assumed)
- Spectral type: S (assumed)
- Absolute magnitude (H): 14.093±0.001 (R) · 14.2 · 14.54 · 14.7

58097 Alimov (provisional designation 1976 UQ_{1}) is a background asteroid and relatively slow rotator from the central region of the asteroid belt, approximately 4 kilometers in diameter.

The asteroid was discovered on 26 October 1976, by Russian astronomer Tamara Smirnova at the Crimean Astrophysical Observatory in Nauchnyj, on the Crimean peninsula. It was later named after Russian ecologist Alexandr Alimov.

== Orbit and classification ==
Alimov is a non-family from the main belt's background population. It orbits the Sun in the central asteroid belt at a distance of 1.9–3.2 AU once every 4 years and 1 month (1,502 days). Its orbit has an eccentricity of 0.26 and an inclination of 13° with respect to the ecliptic.

The asteroid's observation arc begins just 4 days prior to its official discovery observation, with a precovery taken at the Japanese Kiso Observatory on 22 October 1976.

== Physical characteristics ==
=== Lightcurves ===
In October 2013, a rotational lightcurve of Alimov was obtained from photometric observations made by astronomers at the Palomar Transient Factory in California. It gave a relatively long rotation period of 78.1729 hours with a brightness variation of 0.26 magnitude (U=2).

=== Diameter and albedo ===
According to the survey carried out by the NEOWISE mission of NASA's space-based Wide-field Infrared Survey Explorer, Alimov measures 3.9 and 4.0 kilometers in diameter and its surface has an albedo of 0.136 and 0.152, respectively. The Collaborative Asteroid Lightcurve Link assumes a standard albedo for stony asteroids of 0.20 and calculates a diameter of 3.7 kilometers with an absolute magnitude of 14.54.

== Naming ==
This minor planet was named after Russian ecologist Alexandr Fyodorovich Alimov (born 1933), president of the Hydrobiological Society and founder of the Russian School of Functional Ecology.

Alimov is known for his theoretical and experimental work on aquatic ecosystems and for the study on the prevention of ecological crisis. The official naming citation was published by the Minor Planet Center on 6 March 2004 (M.P.C. 51190). (Alexandr Fyodorovich Alimov should not be confused with Aleksandr Fyodorovich Akimov, who worked at Chernobyl during the nuclear accident).
