= 3322 Lidiya =

Phocaea asteroid and potentially slow rotator

Discovery
- Discovered by: T. Smirnova
- Discovery site: Crimean Astrophysical Obs.
- Discovery date: 1 December 1975

Designations
- Named after: Lidiya Zvereva (Russian aviator)
- Alternative designations: 1975 XY_{1} · 1975 VJ_{6}
- Minor planet category: main-belt · (inner); Phocaea

Orbital characteristics
- Epoch 4 September 2017 (JD 2458000.5)
- Uncertainty parameter 0
- Observation arc: 41.49 yr (15,153 days)
- Aphelion: 2.9105 AU
- Perihelion: 1.8738 AU
- Semi-major axis: 2.3921 AU
- Eccentricity: 0.2167
- Orbital period (sidereal): 3.70 yr (1,351 days)
- Mean anomaly: 72.866°
- Mean motion: 0° 15^{m} 59.04^{s} / day
- Inclination: 23.482°
- Longitude of ascending node: 250.74°
- Argument of perihelion: 224.30°

Physical characteristics
- Dimensions: 6.388±0.074 km 7.189±0.029 km 7.99 km (calculated)
- Synodic rotation period: 710 h
- Geometric albedo: 0.23 (assumed); 0.350±0.147; 0.3776±0.0629
- Spectral type: S
- Absolute magnitude (H): 12.4 · 12.7 · 12.8 · 12.84±0.41

3322 Lidiya, provisional designation 1975 XY_{1}, is a stony Phocaea asteroid and potentially slow rotator from the inner regions of the asteroid belt, approximately 7 kilometers in diameter. It was discovered on 1 December 1975, by Soviet astronomer Tamara Smirnova at the Crimean Astrophysical Observatory in Nauchnij, on the Crimean peninsula. The asteroid was named after Russian aviator Lidiya Zvereva.

== Orbit and classification ==
Lidiya is a member of the Phocaea family (701), a large asteroid family of inner-belt asteroids with a stony composition. It orbits the Sun at a distance of 1.9–2.9 AU once every 3 years and 8 months (1,351 days). Its orbit has an eccentricity of 0.22 and an inclination of 23° with respect to the ecliptic.

The body's observation arc begins with its first identification as 1975 VJ_{6} at Nauchnij in November 1975, one month prior to its official discovery observation.

== Physical characteristics ==
Lidiya has been characterized as a stony S-type asteroid by PanSTARRS photometric survey.

=== Potentially slow rotator ===
In December 2012, a fragmentary rotational lightcurve of Lidiya was obtained from photometric observations at the Altimira Observatory (G76) in California. Lightcurve analysis gave a rotation period of 710 hours with a brightness amplitude of 0.60 magnitude (U=1). This would make Lidiya one of the slowest rotators known to exist. However, since the lightcurve has such a poor quality rating, it is only a potentially slow rotator.

=== Diameter and albedo ===
According to the survey carried out by the NEOWISE mission of NASA's Wide-field Infrared Survey Explorer, Lidiya measures 6.388 and 7.189 kilometers in diameter and its surface has an albedo of 0.350 and 0.3776, respectively.

The Collaborative Asteroid Lightcurve Link assumes an albedo of 0.23 – derived from 25 Phocaea, the Phocaea family's largest member and namesake – and calculates a diameter of 7.99 kilometers based on an absolute magnitude of 12.7.

== Naming ==
This minor planet was named after Russian aviator Lidiya Vissarionovna Zvereva (1890–1916), the first Russian female pilot, who began flying in 1911. She was also an instructor of other pilots and involved in the construction of airplanes. The official naming citation was published by the Minor Planet Center on 4 October 1990 (M.P.C. 17027). The crater on Venus, Zvereva was also named in her honor in 1985. (Note: Crater Zvereva, Gazetteer of Planetary Nomenclature. USGS Astrogeology Research Program.)
