= 1804 Chebotarev =

Stony main-belt asteroid

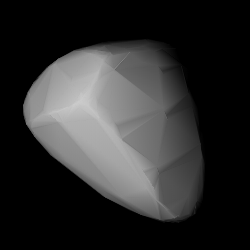
- Shape model of Chebotarev from its lightcurve

Discovery
- Discovered by: T. Smirnova
- Discovery site: Crimean Astrophysical Obs.
- Discovery date: 6 April 1967

Designations
- Named after: G. A. Chebotarev (astronomer)
- Alternative designations: 1967 GG · 1938 QL; 1942 RL · 1968 QK
- Minor planet category: main-belt · (inner)

Orbital characteristics
- Epoch 4 September 2017 (JD 2458000.5)
- Uncertainty parameter 0
- Observation arc: 78.05 yr (28,506 days)
- Aphelion: 2.4628 AU
- Perihelion: 2.3584 AU
- Semi-major axis: 2.4106 AU
- Eccentricity: 0.0217
- Orbital period (sidereal): 3.74 yr (1,367 days)
- Mean anomaly: 96.780°
- Mean motion: 0° 15^{m} 47.88^{s} / day
- Inclination: 3.6316°
- Longitude of ascending node: 325.72°
- Argument of perihelion: 305.47°

Physical characteristics
- Dimensions: 9.15±1.12 km 10.79 km (calculated)
- Synodic rotation period: 4.026±0.002 h
- Geometric albedo: 0.20 (assumed); 0.501±0.289
- Spectral type: S
- Absolute magnitude (H): 11.56 · 12.2 · 12.25±0.45

1804 Chebotarev (prov. designation: 1967 GG) is a stony background asteroid from the inner regions of the asteroid belt, approximately 10 kilometers in diameter. It was discovered on 6 April 1967, by Russian astronomer Tamara Smirnova at the Crimean Astrophysical Observatory in Nauchnyj on the Crimean peninsula. The asteroid was named after Soviet astronomer Gleb Chebotaryov.

== Orbit and classification ==
The stony S-type asteroid orbits the Sun in the inner main-belt at a distance of 2.4–2.5 AU once every 3 years and 9 months (1,367 days). Its orbit has an eccentricity of 0.02 and an inclination of 4° with respect to the ecliptic. Chebotarev was first identified as 1938 QL at Yerkes Observatory in 1938, extending the body's observation arc by 29 years prior to its official discovery observation.

== Physical characteristics ==
=== Rotation period ===
In February 2004, a rotational lightcurve of Chebotarev was obtained from photometric observations by French amateur astronomer Laurent Bernasconi. It gave a well-defined rotation period of 4.026 hours with a brightness amplitude of 0.41 magnitude (U=3).

=== Diameter and albedo ===
According to the survey carried out by NASA's Wide-field Infrared Survey Explorer with its subsequent NEOWISE mission, Chebotarev measures 9.15 kilometers in diameter, and its surface has a high albedo of 0.501, while the Collaborative Asteroid Lightcurve Link assumes a standard albedo for stony asteroids of 0.20 and calculates a diameter of 10.79 kilometers with an absolute magnitude of 12.2.

== Naming ==
This minor planet was named in honor of G. A. Chebotarev (1913–1975), who was a professor and the director of the Institute of Theoretical Astronomy as well as president of IAU's Commission 20, (Positions & Motions of Minor Planets, Comets & Satellites). He is known for his work on celestial mechanics of asteroids, comets and satellites. The official naming citation was published by the Minor Planet Center on 1 January 1974 (M.P.C. 3569).
