= 1854 Skvortsov =

Stony main-belt asteroid

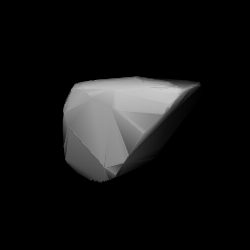
- Shape model of Skvortsov from its lightcurve

Discovery
- Discovered by: T. Smirnova
- Discovery site: Crimean Astrophysical Obs.
- Discovery date: 22 October 1968

Designations
- Named after: Evgenii Skvortsov (astronomer)
- Alternative designations: 1968 UE_{1} · 1962 HC; 1964 VC · 1964 XB
- Minor planet category: main-belt · (middle)

Orbital characteristics
- Epoch 4 September 2017 (JD 2458000.5)
- Uncertainty parameter 0
- Observation arc: 54.75 yr (19,999 days)
- Aphelion: 2.8909 AU
- Perihelion: 2.1855 AU
- Semi-major axis: 2.5382 AU
- Eccentricity: 0.1390
- Orbital period (sidereal): 4.04 yr (1,477 days)
- Mean anomaly: 341.44°
- Mean motion: 0° 14^{m} 37.32^{s} / day
- Inclination: 4.8987°
- Longitude of ascending node: 189.24°
- Argument of perihelion: 274.19°

Physical characteristics
- Dimensions: 8.97 km (calculated); 9.602±0.095 km 10.265±0.070 km
- Synodic rotation period: 78.5±0.2 h
- Geometric albedo: 0.20 (assumed); 0.2031±0.0640; 0.252±0.053
- Spectral type: S
- Absolute magnitude (H): 12.3 · 12.6

1854 Skvortsov (prov. designation: 1968 UE_{1}) is a stony background asteroid and relatively slow rotator from the middle region of the asteroid belt, approximately 9 kilometers in diameter. It was discovered on 22 October 1968, by Russian astronomer Tamara Smirnova at the Crimean Astrophysical Observatory in Nauchnyj on the Crimean peninsula. It is named after astronomer Evgenii Skvortsov.

== Orbit and classification ==
The asteroid orbits the Sun in the central main-belt at a distance of 2.2–2.9 AU once every 4.04 years (1,477 days). Its orbit has an eccentricity of 0.14 and an inclination of 5° with respect to the ecliptic. Skvortsov was first observed at Goethe Link Observatory in 1962, when it was identified as 1962 HC, extending the body's observation arc by 6 years prior to its official discovery observation.

== Naming ==
This minor planet was named in honor of Evgenii Skvortsov (1882–1952), an instructor of astronomy in the Simferopol Pedagogical Institute, an active observer of minor planets at the Crimean Simeiz Observatory, and the discoverer of several minor planets, including 1149 Volga, 1167 Dubiago and 1381 Danubia. The official naming citation was published by the Minor Planet Center on 1 June 1975 (M.P.C. 3825).

== Physical characteristics ==
=== Rotation period ===
In March 2006, a rotational lightcurve for Skvortsov was obtained from photometric observations made by American astronomer Brian D. Warner at his Palmer Divide Observatory in Colorado. It gave a rotation period of 78.5 hours with a brightness variation of 0.56 magnitude (U=2). This is a rather slow rotation rate compared to the average asteroid spin of 2–20 hours.

=== Diameter and albedo ===
According to the survey carried out by NASA's Wide-field Infrared Survey Explorer with its subsequent NEOWISE mission, Skvortsov measures between 9.60 and 10.27 kilometers in diameter, and its surface has an albedo of 0.203 to 0.252. The Collaborative Asteroid Lightcurve Link assumes a standard albedo for stony asteroids of 0.20 and calculates a diameter of 8.97 kilometers with an absolute magnitude of 12.6.
