= 4185 Phystech =

Main-belt asteroid

Discovery
- Discovered by: T. Smirnova
- Discovery site: Crimean Astrophysical Obs.
- Discovery date: 4 March 1975

Designations
- Named after: Moscow Institute of Physics and Technology
- Alternative designations: 1975 ED · 1982 KD; 1982 KH_{4} · 1988 BT
- Minor planet category: main-belt · (inner) background · Flora

Orbital characteristics
- Epoch 23 March 2018 (JD 2458200.5)
- Uncertainty parameter 0
- Observation arc: 64.48 yr (23,550 d)
- Aphelion: 2.4339 AU
- Perihelion: 2.0008 AU
- Semi-major axis: 2.2174 AU
- Eccentricity: 0.0977
- Orbital period (sidereal): 3.30 yr (1,206 d)
- Mean anomaly: 311.69°
- Mean motion: 0° 17^{m} 54.6^{s} / day
- Inclination: 2.2303°
- Longitude of ascending node: 265.78°
- Argument of perihelion: 320.99°

Physical characteristics
- Mean diameter: 5.93 km (calculated)
- Synodic rotation period: 4.66883±0.00014 h 4.66904±0.00003 h
- Geometric albedo: 0.24 (assumed)
- Spectral type: S (assumed)
- Absolute magnitude (H): 13.3

4185 Phystech, provisional designation 1975 ED, is a Florian or background asteroid from the inner regions of the asteroid belt, approximately 6 kilometers (4 miles) in diameter. It was discovered on 4 March 1975, by Soviet astronomer Tamara Smirnova at the Crimean Astrophysical Observatory in Nauchnij, on the Crimean peninsula. The presumed S-type asteroid has a rotation period of 4.67 hours. It is named in honor of the Moscow Institute of Physics and Technology ("PhysTech") on its 50th anniversary.

== Orbit and classification ==
Phystech is a non-family asteroid of the main belt's background population when applying the hierarchical clustering method to its proper orbital elements. Based on osculating Keplerian orbital elements, the asteroid has also been classified as a member of the Flora family (402), a giant asteroid family and the largest family of stony asteroids in the main-belt.

It orbits the Sun in the inner asteroid belt at a distance of 2.0–2.4 AU once every 3 years and 4 months (1,206 days; semi-major axis of 2.22 AU). Its orbit has an eccentricity of 0.10 and an inclination of 2° with respect to the ecliptic. The body's observation arc begins with a precovery taken at Palomar Observatory in October 1953, more than 21 years prior to its official discovery observation at Nauchnij.

== Physical characteristics ==
Phystech is an assumed stony S-type asteroid, based on its family classification.

=== Rotation period ===
In March and April 2008, two rotational lightcurves of Phystech were obtained from photometric observations by American astronomers at LPL and Calvin College (H62). Lightcurve analysis gave a well-defined rotation period of 4.66883 and 4.66904 hours with a brightness amplitude of 0.53 and 0.41 magnitude, respectively (U=3/3).

=== Diameter and albedo ===
The Collaborative Asteroid Lightcurve Link assumes an albedo of 0.24 – derived from 8 Flora, the parent body of the Flora family – and calculates a diameter of 5.93 kilometers based on an absolute magnitude of 13.3.

== Naming ==
This minor planet was named after the Moscow Institute of Physics and Technology (informally: "PhysTech"; Физтех) on the occasion of its 50th anniversary in 1996, based on a proposal by the Institute of Theoretical Astronomy (ITA) in Saint Petersburg, Russia. The official naming citation was published by the Minor Planet Center on 22 February 1997 (M.P.C. 29143).
