= 1835 Gajdariya =

Stony main-belt asteroid

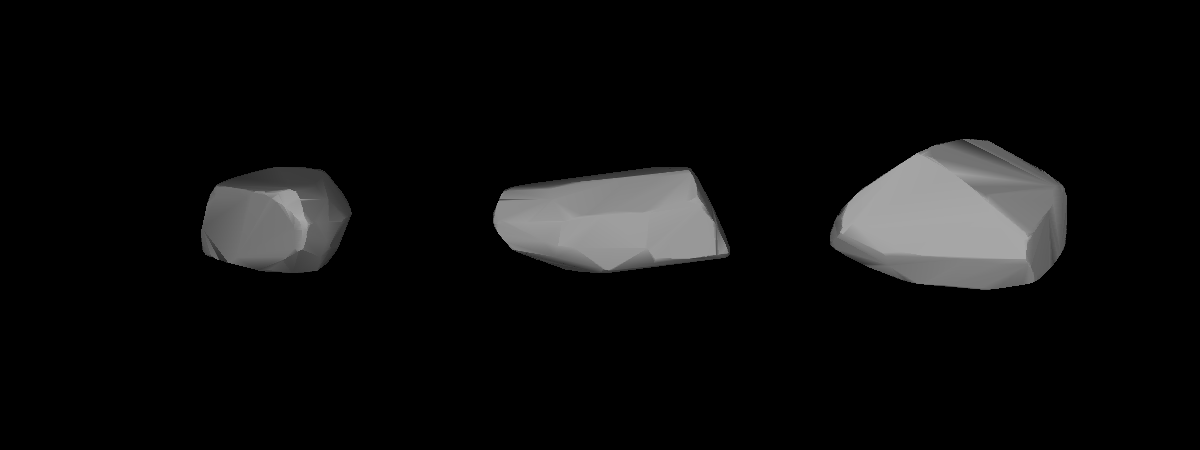
- Lightcurve-based 3D-model of Gajdariya

Discovery
- Discovered by: T. Smirnova
- Discovery site: Crimean Astrophysical Obs.
- Discovery date: 30 July 1970

Designations
- Named after: Arkady Gaidar (Russian writer)
- Alternative designations: 1970 OE · 1958 BH; 1961 TJ · 1961 TQ_{1} 1963 DB · 1971 UJ_{3} 1973 EN
- Minor planet category: main-belt · Koronis

Orbital characteristics
- Epoch 4 September 2017 (JD 2458000.5)
- Uncertainty parameter 0
- Observation arc: 59.28 yr (21,653 days)
- Aphelion: 3.0842 AU
- Perihelion: 2.5811 AU
- Semi-major axis: 2.8326 AU
- Eccentricity: 0.0888
- Orbital period (sidereal): 4.77 yr (1,741 days)
- Mean anomaly: 258.14°
- Mean motion: 0° 12^{m} 24.12^{s} / day
- Inclination: 0.9857°
- Longitude of ascending node: 296.26°
- Argument of perihelion: 80.748°

Physical characteristics
- Dimensions: 12.40 km (calculated); 12.704±0.035; 12.843±0.142 km 13.30±1.04 km
- Synodic rotation period: 6.3276±0.0035 h 6.33768 h
- Geometric albedo: 0.209±0.040; 0.24 (assumed); 0.2703±0.0433
- Spectral type: S
- Absolute magnitude (H): 11.5 · 11.7 · 11.70±0.28

1835 Gajdariya, provisional designation 1970 OE, is a stony Koronian asteroid from the outer region of the asteroid belt, approximately 12.5 kilometers in diameter.

It was discovered on 30 July 1970, by Russian astronomer Tamara Smirnova at Crimean Astrophysical Observatory in Nauchnyj, on the Crimean peninsula. It was named after Russian writer Arkady Gaidar.

== Characteristics ==
The S-type asteroid is a member of the Koronis family, which is named after 158 Koronis and consists of about 300 known bodies with nearly ecliptical orbits. It orbits the Sun in the outer main-belt at a distance of 2.6–3.1 AU once every 4 years and 9 months (1,741 days). Its orbit has an eccentricity of 0.09 and an inclination of 1° with respect to the ecliptic. Its spectra is that of an S-type asteroid with a geometric albedo of about 0.24. It has a rotation period of 6.33 hours.

== Naming ==
It was named in honor of Soviet–Russian writer and children's author Arkady Gaidar (1904–1941), who joined the partisans and became a machine gunner during the Nazi invasion of the Soviet Union. Gaidar was killed in combat in October 1941. The official naming citation was published by the Minor Planet Center on 1 June 1975 (M.P.C. 3825).
