= Bulgarian names in space =

There are a number of objects in the Solar System that have been named after Bulgarian people or places. Many of these are craters on the terrestrial planets but asteroids and exoplanets have also received Bulgarian names.

== Venus ==
- Budevska crater
- Zdravka crater

== Mars ==
- Byala crater
- Dulovo (crater)

== Asteroids ==
- 2575 Bulgaria
- 4364 Shkodrov
- 11856 Nicolabonev
- 225232 Kircheva

=== 253 Mathilde ===
- Maritsa crater
