= 2002 Euler =

Stony background asteroid from the inner regions of the asteroid belt

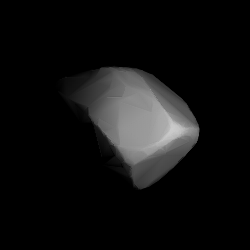
- Shape model of Euler from its lightcurve

Discovery
- Discovered by: T. Smirnova
- Discovery site: Crimean Astrophysical Obs.
- Discovery date: 29 August 1973

Designations
- Pronunciation: /ˈɔɪlər/
- Named after: Leonhard Euler (Swiss mathematician)
- Alternative designations: 1973 QQ_{1} · 1938 DW; 1942 GJ · 1953 EB; 1973 SJ_{2}
- Minor planet category: main-belt · (inner)
- Adjectives: Eulerian /juːˈlɪəriən/

Orbital characteristics
- Epoch 4 September 2017 (JD 2458000.5)
- Uncertainty parameter 0
- Observation arc: 75.04 yr (27,408 days)
- Aphelion: 2.5844 AU
- Perihelion: 2.2512 AU
- Semi-major axis: 2.4178 AU
- Eccentricity: 0.0689
- Orbital period (sidereal): 3.76 yr (1,373 days)
- Mean anomaly: 0.3273°
- Mean motion: 0° 15^{m} 43.92^{s} / day
- Inclination: 8.5015°
- Longitude of ascending node: 178.65°
- Argument of perihelion: 53.294°

Physical characteristics
- Mean diameter: 17.4 km 18.838±0.066
- Mass: 5.5×10^{15} kg
- Synodic rotation period: 5.9929 h
- Geometric albedo: 0.036±0.003; 0.0839±0.015
- Spectral type: S
- Absolute magnitude (H): 12.4 · 12.7

2002 Euler is a stony background asteroid from the inner regions of the asteroid belt, approximately 17 kilometers (11 miles) in diameter. It was discovered on 29 August 1973, by Russian astronomer Tamara Smirnova at the Crimean Astrophysical Observatory in Nauchnyj, and assigned the prov. designation 1973 QQ_{1}. It was named after Swiss mathematician Leonhard Euler.

== Orbit and characterization ==
Euler is a non-family asteroid of the main belt's background population when applying the hierarchical clustering method to its proper orbital elements. It orbits the Sun at a distance of 2.3–2.6 AU once every 3 years and 9 months (1,373 days). Its orbit has an eccentricity of 0.07 and an inclination of 9° with respect to the ecliptic.

== Naming ==
This minor planet was named after Swiss mathematician, physicist and astronomer Leonhard Euler (1707–1783). His contributions to astronomy included two theories for the motion of the Moon. Euler spent much of his time in St. Petersburg and was associated with the Russian Academy of Sciences. The official naming citation was published by the Minor Planet Center on 15 October 1977 (M.P.C. 4238).

== Physical characteristics ==
=== Diameter and albedo ===
According to the surveys carried out by the Infrared Astronomical Satellite IRAS, the Japanese Akari satellite, and NASA's Wide-field Infrared Survey Explorer with its subsequent NEOWISE mission, Euler measures between 14.49 and 19.773 kilometers in diameter and its surface has an albedo between 0.0416 and 0.0839. The Collaborative Asteroid Lightcurve Link adopts Petr Pravec's revised WISE-data, that is, an albedo of 0.0375 and a diameter of 19.78 kilometers with an absolute magnitude of 12.7.
