= Tamara Smirnova =

Soviet astronomer (1935–2001)

- Тамара Смирнова
- Born: 15 December 1935; Genichesk, Ukrainian SSR
- Died: September 5, 2001 (aged 65); Saint Petersburg, Russia
- Scientific career
- Fields: Astronomy
- Institutions: Crimean Astrophysical Observatory; Institute of Theoretical Astronomy

Minor planets discovered: 135
see § List of discovered minor planets

Tamara Mikhaylovna Smirnova (Note: Russian: Тама́ра Миха́йловна Смирно́ва; Ukrainian: Тама́ра Миха́йлівна Смирно́ва, romanized: Tamara Mykhailivna Smirnova) (December 15, 1935 – September 5, 2001) was a Soviet astronomer and a discoverer of minor planets and comets.

== Career ==
From 1966 to 1988, Tamara Smirnova was a staff member of the Institute of Theoretical Astronomy at Leningrad. She is credited by the Minor Planet Center with the discovery of 135 numbered minor planets during 1966–1984. She also co-discovered the periodic comet 74P/Smirnova-Chernykh, along with Nikolai Stepanovich Chernykh.

The main-belt asteroid 5540 Smirnova, discovered by herself in 1971, was named in her honor following a proposal by the Institute of Theoretical Astronomy. Naming citation was published on 17 March 1995 (M.P.C. 24917).

=== List of discovered minor planets ===
List of minor planets

1774 Kulikov	22 October 1968	list
1791 Patsayev	4 September 1967	list
1793 Zoya	28 February 1968	list
1804 Chebotarev	6 April 1967	list
1835 Gajdariya	30 July 1970	list
1854 Skvortsov	22 October 1968	list
1857 Parchomenko	30 August 1971	list
1900 Katyusha	16 December 1971	list
1902 Shaposhnikov	18 April 1972	list
1903 Adzhimushkaj	9 May 1972	list

1904 Massevitch	9 May 1972	list
1905 Ambartsumian	14 May 1972	list
1977 Shura	30 August 1970	list
2002 Euler	29 August 1973	list
2009 Voloshina	22 October 1968	list
2011 Veteraniya	30 August 1970	list
2032 Ethel	30 July 1970	list
2046 Leningrad	22 October 1968	list
2071 Nadezhda	18 August 1971	list
2072 Kosmodemyanskaya	31 August 1973	list

2093 Genichesk	28 April 1971	list
2111 Tselina	13 June 1969	list
2112 Ulyanov	13 July 1972	list
2120 Tyumenia	9 September 1967	list
2121 Sevastopol	27 June 1971	list
2122 Pyatiletka	14 December 1971	list
2126 Gerasimovich	30 August 1970	list
2139 Makharadze	30 June 1970	list
2140 Kemerovo	3 August 1970	list
2141 Simferopol	30 August 1970	list

2171 Kiev	28 August 1973	list
2172 Plavsk	31 August 1973	list
2192 Pyatigoriya	18 April 1972	list
2216 Kerch	12 June 1971	list
2217 Eltigen	26 September 1971	list
2250 Stalingrad	18 April 1972	list
2280 Kunikov	26 September 1971	list
2328 Robeson	19 April 1972	list
2342 Lebedev	22 October 1968	list
2345 Fučik	25 July 1974	list

2349 Kurchenko	30 July 1970	list
2360 Volgo-Don	2 November 1975	list
2371 Dimitrov	2 November 1975	list
2400 Derevskaya	17 May 1972	list
2401 Aehlita	2 November 1975	list
2422 Perovskaya	28 April 1968	list
2438 Oleshko	2 November 1975	list
2447 Kronstadt	31 August 1973	list
2469 Tadjikistan	27 April 1970	list
2519 Annagerman	2 November 1975	list

2574 Ladoga	22 October 1968	list
2575 Bulgaria	4 August 1970	list
2578 Saint-Exupéry	2 November 1975	list
2583 Fatyanov	3 December 1975	list
2604 Marshak	13 June 1972	list
2616 Lesya	28 August 1970	list
2681 Ostrovskij	2 November 1975	list
2754 Efimov	13 August 1966	list
3049 Kuzbass	28 March 1968	list
3055 Annapavlova	4 October 1978	list

3071 Nesterov	28 March 1973	list
3082 Dzhalil	17 May 1972	list
3093 Bergholz	28 June 1971	list
3119 Dobronravin	30 December 1972	list
3146 Dato	17 May 1972	list
3159 Prokofʹev	26 October 1976	list
3322 Lidiya	1 December 1975	list
3347 Konstantin	2 November 1975	list
3418 Izvekov	31 August 1973	list
3460 Ashkova	31 August 1973	list

3482 Lesnaya	2 November 1975	list
3501 Olegiya	18 August 1971	list
3652 Soros	6 October 1981	list
3813 Fortov	30 August 1970	list
3862 Agekian	18 May 1972	list
3962 Valyaev	8 February 1967	list
4006 Sandler	29 December 1972	list
4049 Noragalʹ	31 August 1973	list
4135 Svetlanov	14 August 1966	list^{[A]}
4136 Artmane	28 March 1968	list

4139 Ulʹyanin	2 November 1975	list
4185 Phystech	4 March 1975	list
4267 Basner	18 August 1971	list
4268 Grebenikov	5 October 1972	list
4302 Markeev	22 April 1968	list
4307 Cherepashchuk	26 October 1976	list
4424 Arkhipova	16 February 1967	list
4427 Burnashev	30 August 1971	list
4467 Kaidanovskij	2 November 1975	list
4513 Louvre	30 August 1971	list

4514 Vilen	19 April 1972	list
4591 Bryantsev	1 November 1975	list
4851 Vodopʹyanova	26 October 1976	list
4962 Vecherka	1 October 1973	list
5015 Litke	1 November 1975	list
5155 Denisyuk	18 April 1972	list
5156 Golant	18 May 1972	list
5410 Spivakov	16 February 1967	list
5453 Zakharchenya	3 November 1975	list
5540 Smirnova	30 August 1971	list

5667 Nakhimovskaya	16 August 1983	list
5930 Zhiganov	2 November 1975	list
6074 Bechtereva	24 August 1968	list
6108 Glebov	18 August 1971	list
6214 Mikhailgrinev	26 September 1971	list
6578 Zapesotskij	13 October 1980	list
6621 Timchuk	2 November 1975	list
6844 Shpak	3 November 1975	list
7153 Vladzakharov	2 December 1975	list
7222 Alekperov	7 October 1981	list

7269 Alprokhorov	2 November 1975	list
7369 Gavrilin	13 January 1975	list
7544 Tipografiyanauka	26 October 1976	list
7856 Viktorbykov	1 November 1975	list
8445 Novotroitskoe	31 August 1973	list
8448 Belyakina	26 October 1976	list
8782 Bakhrakh	26 October 1976	list
8787 Ignatenko	4 October 1978	list
9158 Platè	25 June 1984	list
9262 Bordovitsyna	6 September 1973	list

9297 Marchuk	25 June 1984	list
9545 Petrovedomosti	25 June 1984	list
10004 Igormakarov	2 November 1975	list
10259 Osipovyurij	18 April 1972	list
11253 Mesyats	26 October 1976	list
11438 Zeldovich	29 August 1973	list
12657 Bonch-Bruevich	30 August 1971	list
13474 Vʹyus	29 August 1973	list
14312 Polytech	26 October 1976	list
14790 Beletskij	30 July 1970	list

14815 Rutberg	7 October 1981	list
18288 Nozdrachev	2 November 1975	list
22250 Konstfrolov	7 September 1978	list
24609 Evgenij	7 September 1978	list
58097 Alimov	26 October 1976	list
Co-discovery made with:^{A} L. I. Chernykh

== See also ==
- List of minor planet discoverers § T. M. Smirnova
