= 2140 Kemerovo =

Dark asteroid

Discovery
- Discovered by: L. Chernykh; T. Smirnova
- Discovery site: Crimean Astrophysical Obs.
- Discovery date: 3 August 1970

Designations
- Named after: Kemerovo Oblast (Russian federal subject)
- Alternative designations: 1970 PE · 1926 AJ; 1940 WB · 1952 BH_{1} 1957 BB · 1973 FY; 1974 MP · 1975 NM_{1} 1975 QJ · 1975 RM_{1}
- Minor planet category: main-belt · (outer)

Orbital characteristics
- Epoch 4 September 2017 (JD 2458000.5)
- Uncertainty parameter 0
- Observation arc: 64.85 yr (23,688 days)
- Aphelion: 3.1617 AU
- Perihelion: 2.8137 AU
- Semi-major axis: 2.9877 AU
- Eccentricity: 0.0582
- Orbital period (sidereal): 5.16 yr (1,886 days)
- Mean anomaly: 334.71°
- Mean motion: 0° 11^{m} 27.24^{s} / day
- Inclination: 6.9851°
- Longitude of ascending node: 274.75°
- Argument of perihelion: 119.69°

Physical characteristics
- Dimensions: 29.33 km (derived); 29.49±1.6 km (IRAS:4); 32.11±0.52 km 34.539±0.128; 37.886±0.366 km
- Synodic rotation period: 9.2±0.6 h (2006)
- Geometric albedo: 0.0537±0.0073; 0.0620 (derived); 0.063±0.007; 0.076±0.003; 0.0887±0.011 (IRAS:4)
- Spectral type: P · X (Tholen)
- Absolute magnitude (H): 10.9 · 11.3

2140 Kemerovo, provisional designation 1970 PE, is a dark asteroid from the outer region of the asteroid belt, approximately 30 kilometers in diameter.

The asteroid was discovered on 3 August 1970, by Russian female astronomers Lyudmila Chernykh and Tamara Smirnova at the Crimean Astrophysical Observatory in Nauchnyj, on the Crimean peninsula. It was named after Kemerovo Oblast in Siberia.

== Orbit and classification ==
Kemerovo orbits the Sun in the outer main-belt at a distance of 2.8–3.2 AU once every 5 years and 2 months (1,886 days). Its orbit has an eccentricity of 0.06 and an inclination of 7° with respect to the ecliptic.

It was first identified as 1926 AJ at Bergedorf Observatory in 1926. The body's observation arc begins with its first used observation, a precovery taken at Palomar Observatory in 1951, approximately 19 years prior to its official discovery at Nauchnyj.

== Physical characteristics ==
In the Tholen taxonomy, Kemerovo is an X-type asteroid. The dark body has also been characterized as a rare and reddish P-type asteroid by the NEOWISE mission.

=== Lightcurves ===
Two rotational lightcurves of Kemerovo were obtained from photometric observations made by French astronomers René Roy, Laurent Bernasconi and Olivier Thizy in August 2001 and July 2006. Both lightcurves gave a rotation period of 9.2±0.6 hours with a brightness amplitude of 0.18 and 0.19 in magnitude, respectively (U=2/2).

=== Diameter and albedo ===
According to the space-based surveys carried out by the Infrared Astronomical Satellite IRAS, the Japanese Akari satellite (mid-infrared), and the NEOWISE mission of NASA's Wide-field Infrared Survey Explorer, Kemerovo measures between 29.5 and 37.9 kilometers in diameter, and its surface has an albedo between 0.05 and 0.09. The Collaborative Asteroid Lightcurve Link derives an albedo of 0.062 and calculates a diameter of 29.3 kilometers with an absolute magnitude of 11.3.

== Naming ==
This minor planet was named after Kemerovo Oblast, the regional center of the Russian Kemerovo district, and a significant industrial center in Siberia. The official naming citation was published by the Minor Planet Center on 8 February 1982 (M.P.C. 6647).
