= 2046 Leningrad =

Main-belt asteroid

Discovery
- Discovered by: T. Smirnova
- Discovery site: Crimean Astrophysical Obs.
- Discovery date: 22 October 1968

Designations
- Named after: Saint Petersburg (Russian city)
- Alternative designations: 1968 UD_{1} · 1929 VK; 1934 RK · 1940 UF; 1955 HN · 1957 YV; 1973 QS · 1973 SH_{3}
- Minor planet category: main-belt · Themis

Orbital characteristics
- Epoch 4 September 2017 (JD 2458000.5)
- Uncertainty parameter 0
- Observation arc: 87.51 yr (31,964 days)
- Aphelion: 3.7227 AU
- Perihelion: 2.5902 AU
- Semi-major axis: 3.1565 AU
- Eccentricity: 0.1794
- Orbital period (sidereal): 5.61 yr (2,048 days)
- Mean anomaly: 288.85°
- Mean motion: 0° 10^{m} 32.88^{s} / day
- Inclination: 2.7356°
- Longitude of ascending node: 73.570°
- Argument of perihelion: 284.26°

Physical characteristics
- Dimensions: 23.55 km (calculated); 23.968±0.292 km 27.67±0.67 km
- Synodic rotation period: 5.296±0.003 h
- Geometric albedo: 0.060±0.003; 0.08 (assumed); 0.085±0.017
- Spectral type: C
- Absolute magnitude (H): 11.15±0.23 · 11.4 · 11.5

2046 Leningrad, provisional designation 1968 UD_{1}, is a carbonaceous Themistian asteroid from the outer regions of the asteroid belt, approximately 24 kilometers in diameter. It was discovered on 22 October 1968, by Soviet astronomer Tamara Smirnova at the Crimean Astrophysical Observatory in Nauchnij, on the Crimean peninsula. The asteroid was named after the Soviet city of Leningrad (now St. Petersburg).

== Orbit and classification ==
Leningrad is a member of the Themis family, a dynamical family of carbonaceous asteroids with nearly coplanar ecliptical orbits, located in the outer-belt main. It orbits the Sun at a distance of 2.6–3.7 AU once every 5 years and 7 months (2,048 days). Its orbit has an eccentricity of 0.18 and an inclination of 3° with respect to the ecliptic.

The body's observation arc begins 39 years prior to its official discovery observation, with a precovery taken at Lowell Observatory in October 1929. One week later, the asteroid was identified as 1929 VK at Lowell Observatory.

=== Lightcurves ===
In August 2012, a rotational lightcurve of Leningrad was obtained from photometric observations by astronomers at the Oakley Southern Sky Observatory (E09). Lightcurve analysis gave a rotation period of 5.296 hours with a brightness variation of 0.11 magnitude (U=2+).

=== Diameter and albedo ===
According to the surveys carried out by the Japanese Akari satellite, and NASA's Wide-field Infrared Survey Explorer with its subsequent NEOWISE mission, Leningrad measures 23.968 and 27.67 kilometers in diameter and its surface has an albedo of 0.060 and 0.085, respectively.

The Collaborative Asteroid Lightcurve Link assumes a standard albedo for Themistian asteroids of 0.08 and calculates a diameter of 23.55 kilometers based on an absolute magnitude of 11.5.

== Naming ==
This minor planet was named for Saint Petersburg, the second largest city of Russia after Moscow. During the Soviet Union, the city was named "Leningrad" between 1924 and 1991. It was also called Petrograd during 1914–1924. The approved naming citation was published by the Minor Planet Center on 1 April 1980 (M.P.C. 5282).
