= 2122 Pyatiletka =

Stony asteroid

Discovery
- Discovered by: T. Smirnova
- Discovery site: Crimean Astrophysical Obs.
- Discovery date: 14 December 1971

Designations
- Named after: Pyatiletka (Five-year plans of the USSR)
- Alternative designations: 1971 XB · 1950 BE_{1} 1950 DX · 1951 KB_{1} 1954 DA · 1961 AL; 1969 EV_{1}
- Minor planet category: main-belt · (inner)

Orbital characteristics
- Epoch 4 September 2017 (JD 2458000.5)
- Uncertainty parameter 0
- Observation arc: 63.18 yr (23,075 days)
- Aphelion: 2.4729 AU
- Perihelion: 2.3310 AU
- Semi-major axis: 2.4019 AU
- Eccentricity: 0.0295
- Orbital period (sidereal): 3.72 yr (1,360 days)
- Mean anomaly: 197.74°
- Mean motion: 0° 15^{m} 53.28^{s} / day
- Inclination: 7.8981°
- Longitude of ascending node: 105.50°
- Argument of perihelion: 236.47°

Physical characteristics
- Dimensions: 10.75 km (calculated); 11.00±0.83 km 11.084±0.101 km 11.554±0.074 km
- Synodic rotation period: 8.899±0.0053 h
- Geometric albedo: 0.1931±0.0198; 0.20 (assumed); 0.211±0.033; 0.224±0.023
- Spectral type: S
- Absolute magnitude (H): 11.759±0.002 (R) · 12.1 · 12.21 · 12.40±0.29

2122 Pyatiletka, provisional designation 1971 XB, is a stony asteroid from the inner regions of the asteroid belt, approximately 11 kilometers in diameter.

The asteroid was discovered on 14 December 1971 by Soviet astronomer Tamara Smirnova at the Crimean Astrophysical Observatory in Nauchnyj, on the Crimean peninsula. It was named for "pyatiletka", the first Five-Year Plan of the USSR.

== Orbit and classification ==
Pyatiletka orbits the Sun in the inner main-belt at a distance of 2.3–2.5 AU once every 3 years and 9 months (1,360 days). Its orbit has an eccentricity of 0.03 and an inclination of 8° with respect to the ecliptic.

It was first identified as 1950 BE_{1} at Simeiz Observatory in 1950. The body's observation arc begins at Lowell Observatory in 1961, when it was identified as 1961 AL, 10 years prior to its official discovery observation at Nauchnyj.

== Physical characteristics ==
Pyatiletka has been characterized as a stony S-type asteroid.

=== Lightcurves ===
A fragmentary rotational lightcurve of Pyatiletka was obtained from photometric observations at the Palomar Transient Factory in California in February 2010. Lightcurve analysis gave a tentative rotation period of 8.899 hours with a brightness variation of 0.10 magnitude (U=1). As of 2017, no other lightcurve has been published.

=== Diameter and albedo ===
According to the surveys carried out by the Japanese Akari satellite and NASA's Wide-field Infrared Survey Explorer with its subsequent NEOWISE mission, Pyatiletka measures between 11.00 and 11.55 kilometers in diameter, and its surface has an albedo between 0.1931 and 0.224. The Collaborative Asteroid Lightcurve Link assumes a standard albedo for stony asteroids of 0.20 and calculates a diameter of 10.75 kilometers with an absolute magnitude of 12.21.

== Naming ==
This minor planet was named in honor of the five-year plans of the Soviet Union on the occasion of the 50th anniversary of its first adoption. The official naming citation was published by the Minor Planet Center on 1 April 1980 (M.P.C. 5283).
