= 2093 Genichesk =

Main-belt asteroid

Discovery
- Discovered by: T. Smirnova
- Discovery site: Crimean Astrophysical Obs.
- Discovery date: 28 April 1971

Designations
- Named after: Henichesk (Ukrainian town)
- Alternative designations: 1971 HX · 1974 CN_{1} 1975 VG_{2}
- Minor planet category: main-belt · Baptistina

Orbital characteristics
- Epoch 4 September 2017 (JD 2458000.5)
- Uncertainty parameter 0
- Observation arc: 66.78 yr (24,392 days)
- Aphelion: 2.6507 AU
- Perihelion: 1.8877 AU
- Semi-major axis: 2.2692 AU
- Eccentricity: 0.1681
- Orbital period (sidereal): 3.42 yr (1,249 days)
- Mean anomaly: 175.62°
- Mean motion: 0° 17^{m} 17.88^{s} / day
- Inclination: 6.0914°
- Longitude of ascending node: 154.86°
- Argument of perihelion: 118.21°

Physical characteristics
- Dimensions: 8.804±1.922 km 12.29 km (derived)
- Synodic rotation period: 11.022±0.002 h 11.0231±0.0159 h 11.028±0.006 h (Note: Lightcurve plot of 2093 Genichesk, with a rotation period of 11.028±0.006 and an amplitude of 0.24 ± 0.02 magnitude. Palmer Divide Observatory, B. D. Warner (2008).)
- Geometric albedo: 0.057 (assumed); 0.158±0.108
- Spectral type: C
- Absolute magnitude (H): 12.880±0.004 (R) · 12.9 · 13.28±0.04 · 13.28±0.19 · 13.28

2093 Genichesk, provisional designation 1971 HX, is a Baptistina asteroid from the inner regions of the asteroid belt, approximately 12 kilometers in diameter. It was discovered on 28 April 1971, by Russian astronomer Tamara Smirnova at the Crimean Astrophysical Observatory in Nauchnyj, on the Crimean peninsula. It was named for the Ukrainian town Henichesk.

== Orbit and classification ==
Genichesk is a member of the Baptistina family. It orbits the Sun in the inner main-belt at a distance of 1.9–2.7 AU once every 3 years and 5 months (1,249 days). Its orbit has an eccentricity of 0.17 and an inclination of 6° with respect to the ecliptic. A first precovery was taken at Palomar Observatory in 1950, extending the body's observation arc by 21 years prior to its official discovery.

== Physical characteristics ==
=== Diameter and albedo ===
The Collaborative Asteroid Lightcurve Link assumes a standard albedo for carbonaceous C-type asteroids of 0.57 and calculates a diameter of 12.29 kilometers, based on an absolute magnitude of 13.28, while according to preliminary data from the NEOWISE mission of NASA's Wide-field Infrared Survey Explorer, the asteroid's surface has a much higher albedo of 0.158 and only measures 8.8 kilometers in diameter.

=== Rotation period ===
Photometric observations by astronomer Brian D. Warner at the Palmer Divide Observatory in Colorado (716) during winter 2007–2008 were used to build a lightcurve, which gave a rotation period of 11.028±0.006 hours and a brightness variation of 0.24±0.02 in magnitude (U=3). The results concur with observations made by French amateur astronomers Stéphane Charbonnel and Laurent Bernasconi, and with analysed data from the Palomar Transient Factory Survey in 2004 and 2015, respectively (U=2/2).

== Naming ==
This minor planet was named after the Ukrainian town Genichesk (Henichesk), the discoverer's birthplace in the former Ukrainian Soviet Socialist Republic. The official naming citation was published by the Minor Planet Center on 1 April 1980 (M.P.C. 5282).
