= 4962 Vecherka =

Main-belt asteroid

Discovery
- Discovered by: T. Smirnova
- Discovery site: Crimean Astrophysical Obs.
- Discovery date: 1 October 1973

Designations
- Named after: Vechernij Petersburg (Russian newspaper)
- Alternative designations: 1973 TP · 1952 TF; 1969 TM_{6} · 1973 UG_{3} 1986 WC_{3}
- Minor planet category: main-belt · (middle); Maria · background

Orbital characteristics
- Epoch 4 September 2017 (JD 2458000.5)
- Uncertainty parameter 0
- Observation arc: 64.61 yr (23,600 days)
- Aphelion: 2.9857 AU
- Perihelion: 2.2265 AU
- Semi-major axis: 2.6061 AU
- Eccentricity: 0.1457
- Orbital period (sidereal): 4.21 yr (1,537 days)
- Mean anomaly: 170.48°
- Mean motion: 0° 14^{m} 3.48^{s} / day
- Inclination: 15.108°
- Longitude of ascending node: 207.02°
- Argument of perihelion: 141.66°

Physical characteristics
- Dimensions: 8.54±0.59 km 9.62±2.43 km 9.951±0.201 km 10.06 km (calculated)
- Synodic rotation period: 336±48 h
- Geometric albedo: 0.21 (assumed); 0.210±0.038; 0.21±0.11; 0.2102±0.0377; 0.349±0.170
- Spectral type: S (assumed)
- Absolute magnitude (H): 11.94±0.27 · 12.10 · 12.3 · 12.67

4962 Vecherka, provisional designation 1973 TP, is a Eunomian asteroid and slow rotator from the central regions of the asteroid belt, approximately 10 kilometers in diameter. It was discovered on 1 October 1973, by Soviet astronomer Tamara Smirnova at the Crimean Astrophysical Observatory in Nauchnij, on the Crimean peninsula. The asteroid was named after Vechernij Petersburg, a newspaper that also publishes astronomical information.

== Orbit and classification ==
When applying the hierarchical clustering method to its proper orbital elements, Vecherka has both been considered a non-family asteroid of the main belt's background population (according to Nesvorný), and core member of the Maria family (according to Milani and Knežević).

It orbits the Sun in the central asteroid belt at a distance of 2.2–3.0 AU once every 4 years and 3 months (1,537 days). Its orbit has an eccentricity of 0.15 and an inclination of 15° with respect to the ecliptic. The body's observation arc begins with its first observation as 1952 TF at Uccle Observatory in October 1952, or 21 years prior to its official discovery observation at Nauchnij.

== Physical characteristics ==
Vecherka is an assumed stony S-type asteroid, which corresponds to the overall spectral type of the Maria family.

=== Slow rotator ===
In August 2015, a rotational lightcurve of Vecherka was obtained from photometric observations by a collaboration of Bulgarian astronomers. Lightcurve analysis gave a long rotation period of 336±48 hours with a brightness variation of 1.08 magnitude (U=2), indicating that the body's shape is irregular and elongated rather than spherical. This long period makes Vecherka a slow rotator, which ranks among the Top 200 slowest ones known to exists.

=== Diameter and albedo ===
According to the survey carried out by the NEOWISE mission of NASA's Wide-field Infrared Survey Explorer, Vecherka measures between 8.54 and 9.951 kilometers in diameter and its surface has an albedo between 0.210 and 0.349.

The Collaborative Asteroid Lightcurve Link assumes an albedo of 0.21 – derived from 15 Eunomia, the family's largest member and namesake – and calculates a diameter of 10.06 kilometers based on an absolute magnitude of 12.3.

== Naming ==
Based on a proposal by the Institute of Theoretical Astronomy (ITA), this minor planet was named after Vechernij Petersburg, a popular evening newspaper from Saint Petersburg, Russia, that publishes astronomical information and articles popularizing astronomical knowledge on a regular basis. The official naming citation was published by the Minor Planet Center on 14 December 1997 (M.P.C. 31023).
