= 13474 Vʹyus =

Main-belt asteroid

Discovery
- Discovered by: T. Smirnova
- Discovery site: Crimean Astrophysical Obs.
- Discovery date: 29 August 1973

Designations
- Named after: Yurij Sergeevich Vasil'ev (Rector of SPbSTU)
- Alternative designations: 1973 QO_{1} · 1956 SA; 1990 RT_{4}
- Minor planet category: main-belt · (middle) background

Orbital characteristics
- Epoch 27 April 2019 (JD 2458600.5)
- Uncertainty parameter 0
- Observation arc: 61.56 yr (22,485 d)
- Aphelion: 3.3863 AU
- Perihelion: 1.8591 AU
- Semi-major axis: 2.6227 AU
- Eccentricity: 0.2911
- Orbital period (sidereal): 4.25 yr (1,551 d)
- Mean anomaly: 267.15°
- Mean motion: 0° 13^{m} 55.2^{s} / day
- Inclination: 7.8141°
- Longitude of ascending node: 317.29°
- Argument of perihelion: 36.160°

Physical characteristics
- Mean diameter: 6.922±0.351 km 7.876±0.701 km
- Synodic rotation period: 6.587±0.001 h
- Geometric albedo: 0.113±0.022; 0.147±0.020
- Spectral type: S/C (assumed)
- Absolute magnitude (H): 13.5; 13.7

13474 Vʹyus, provisional designation 1973 QO_{1}, is a background asteroid from the central asteroid belt, approximately 7 kilometers (4.3 miles) in diameter. It was discovered on 29 August 1973, by Soviet astronomer Tamara Smirnova at the Crimean Astrophysical Observatory in Nauchnyj on the Crimean peninsula. The asteroid has a rotation period of 6.6 hours and is likely elongated in shape. It was named after Yurij Sergeevich Vasil'ev, rector of the former Saint Petersburg State Technical University in Russia.

== Orbit and classification ==
Vʹyus is a non-family asteroid from the main belt's background population. It orbits the Sun in the central asteroid belt at a distance of 1.9–3.4 AU once every 4 years and 3 months (1,551 days; semi-major axis of 2.62 AU). Its orbit has an eccentricity of 0.29 and an inclination of 8° with respect to the ecliptic.

The body's observation arc begins with its first identification as 1956 SA at Goethe Link Observatory in September 1956, almost 17 years prior to its official discovery observation at Nauchnyj.

== Naming ==
This minor planet was named after Yurij Sergeevich Vasil'ev (Yurij Vasilyev; born 1929), expert in hydropower engineering and rector of the Saint Petersburg State Technical University (SPbSTU), now known as the Peter the Great St. Petersburg Polytechnic University in Russia. The name is formed by putting the surname first and then concatenating the three Cyrillic letters that form his initials — Vasil'ev Yurij Sergeevich, ВЮС. The official naming citation was published by the Minor Planet Center on 27 April 2002 (M.P.C. 45338).

== Physical characteristics ==
The asteroid's spectral type is unknown. The Lightcurve Data Base assumes an S- or C-type to be equally likely, using an averaged value for its albedo (see below). (Note: Asteroid Lightcurve Data Base (LCDB) – 2. Taxonomic Class, orbital class, and albedo. The LCDB generically assumes an S/C-type with an albedo of 0.10 for non-family main belt asteroids with a semi-major axis between 2.6 and 2.7.)

=== Rotation period ===
In September 2007, a rotational lightcurve of Vʹyus was obtained from photometric observations by Maurice Clark at the Montgomery College Observatory in Maryland, United States. Lightcurve analysis gave a well-defined rotation period of 6.587 hours with a brightness amplitude of 0.85 magnitude (U=3). A high brightness amplitude typically indicates that the body has an elongated rather than spherical shape.

=== Diameter and albedo ===
According to the survey carried out by the NEOWISE mission of NASA's Wide-field Infrared Survey Explorer, Vʹyus measures 6.922 and 7.876 kilometers in diameter and its surface has an albedo of 0.147 and 0.113, respectively. The Collaborative Asteroid Lightcurve Link assumes an albedo of 0.10 – a compromise value between the stony (0.20) and carbonaceous (0.057) asteroid's, both abundant in the main belt's central region – and calculates a diameter of 7.65 kilometers based on an absolute magnitude of 13.7.
