= 2328 Robeson =

Main-belt asteroid

Discovery
- Discovered by: T. Smirnova
- Discovery site: Crimean Astrophysical Obs.
- Discovery date: 19 April 1972

Designations
- Named after: Paul Robeson (American singer and actor)
- Alternative designations: 1972 HW
- Minor planet category: main-belt · (inner) background

Orbital characteristics
- Epoch 23 March 2018 (JD 2458200.5)
- Uncertainty parameter 0
- Observation arc: 45.76 yr (16,714 d)
- Aphelion: 2.6814 AU
- Perihelion: 2.0009 AU
- Semi-major axis: 2.3411 AU
- Eccentricity: 0.1453
- Orbital period (sidereal): 3.58 yr (1,308 d)
- Mean anomaly: 341.08°
- Mean motion: 0° 16^{m} 30.72^{s} / day
- Inclination: 10.016°
- Longitude of ascending node: 182.19°
- Argument of perihelion: 340.93°

Physical characteristics
- Mean diameter: 7.46 km (calculated); 11.75±1.4 km 12.67±0.77 km 12.75±4.10 km 12.895±2.594 km 12.90±2.59 km 13.30±0.46 km
- Synodic rotation period: 18.632±0.004 h
- Geometric albedo: 0.06±0.01; 0.067±0.053; 0.07±0.03; 0.074±0.034; 0.105±0.008; 0.1281±0.038; 0.20 (assumed)
- Spectral type: SMASS = C · X S (assumed)
- Absolute magnitude (H): 12.50 · 12.80; 13.0 · 13.02; 13.16 · 13.52±0.24

2328 Robeson, provisional designation 1972 HW, is a background asteroid from the inner regions of the asteroid belt, approximately 13 kilometers (8 miles) in diameter. It was discovered on 19 April 1972, by astronomer Soviet–Russian Tamara Smirnova at the Crimean Astrophysical Observatory in Nauchnij, on the Crimean peninsula. It was named after American actor and singer Paul Robeson. The C/X-type asteroid has a rotation period of 18.6 hours.

== Orbit and classification ==
Robeson is a non-family asteroid from the main belt's background population. It orbits the Sun in the inner main-belt at a distance of 2.0–2.7 AU once every 3 years and 7 months (1,308 days; semi-major axis of 2.34 AU). Its orbit has an eccentricity of 0.15 and an inclination of 10° with respect to the ecliptic. The body's observation arc begins with its official discovery observation at Nauchnij in April 1972.

== Physical characteristics ==
In the SMASS classification Robeson is a carbonaceous C-type asteroid. It has also been characterized as an X-type asteroid by Pan-STARRS' photometric survey.

=== Rotation period ===
In December 2006, a rotational lightcurve of Robeson was obtained from photometric observations at the Leura (E17) and Hunters Hill (E14) observatories in Australia. Lightcurve analysis gave a rotation period of 18.632 hours with a brightness amplitude of 0.20 magnitude (U=2+).

=== Diameter and albedo ===
According to the surveys carried out by the Infrared Astronomical Satellite IRAS, the Japanese Akari satellite and the NEOWISE mission of NASA's Wide-field Infrared Survey Explorer, Robeson measures between 11.75 and 13.30 kilometers in diameter and its surface has an albedo between 0.06 and 0.1281.

The Collaborative Asteroid Lightcurve Link assumes it to be a stony asteroid with a standard albedo of 0.20 and calculates a diameter of 7.46 kilometers based on an absolute magnitude of 13.0.

== Naming ==
This minor planet was named after in memory of African-American singer and actor Paul Robeson (1898–1976). The official naming citation was published by the Minor Planet Center on 8 February 1982 (M.P.C. 6648).
