= 2121 Sevastopol =

Main-belt asteroid binary

Discovery
- Discovered by: T. Smirnova
- Discovery site: Crimean Astrophysical Obs.
- Discovery date: 27 June 1971

Designations
- Pronunciation: /səˈvæstəpoʊl/
- Named after: Sevastopol city
- Alternative designations: 1971 ME · 1932 HM; 1936 WD · 1938 DY; 1939 TO · 1952 SZ; 1968 QJ_{1} · 1977 ED_{2} 1978 WG
- Minor planet category: main-belt · Flora

Orbital characteristics
- Epoch 4 September 2017 (JD 2458000.5)
- Uncertainty parameter 0
- Observation arc: 79.82 yr (29,154 days)
- Aphelion: 2.5731 AU
- Perihelion: 1.7945 AU
- Semi-major axis: 2.1838 AU
- Eccentricity: 0.1783
- Orbital period (sidereal): 3.23 yr (1,179 days)
- Mean anomaly: 94.889°
- Mean motion: 0° 18^{m} 19.44^{s} / day
- Inclination: 4.3780°
- Longitude of ascending node: 145.72°
- Argument of perihelion: 160.38°
- Known satellites: 1

Physical characteristics
- Dimensions: 8.736±0.037 km 12.48 km (calculated)
- Synodic rotation period: 2.90640 h
- Geometric albedo: 0.24 (assumed); 0.308±0.023
- Spectral type: S
- Absolute magnitude (H): 12.2

Satellite
Discovery
- Discovered by: D. Higgins, P. Pravec, P. Kusnirak, J. Pollock, J. Oey, M. Husarik, G. Cervak, D. E. Reichart, K. M. Ivarsen, J. B. Haislip, and A. LaCluyze
- Discovery date: 2010/07/23
- Detection method: Light curve

Orbital characteristics
- Semi-major axis: 26 km
- Orbital period (sidereal): 1.546 d 13 hours, 6 minutes
- Angular distance: 46 mas (maximum)
- Satellite of: 2121 Sevastopol

Physical characteristics
- Dimensions: 3.54 ± 0.17 km
- Volume: 20.0-26.7 km^{3} (assumed)
- Apparent magnitude: 1.9 ± 0.1 fainter than primary
- Absolute magnitude (H): ~16.1

2121 Sevastopol, provisional designation 1971 ME, is a stony Florian asteroid and synchronous binary system from the inner regions of the asteroid belt, approximately 10 kilometers in diameter. It was discovered on 27 June 1971, by Russian astronomer Tamara Smirnova at the Crimean Astrophysical Observatory in Nauchnij, on the Crimean peninsula. Its minor-planet moon was discovered in 2010.

== Orbit and characterization ==
Sevastopol is a member of the Flora family, one of the largest groups of stony asteroids in the main-belt. It orbits the Sun in the inner main-belt at a distance of 1.8–2.6 AU once every 3 years and 3 months (1,179 days). Its orbit has an eccentricity of 0.18 and an inclination of 4° with respect to the ecliptic.

=== Satellite ===
In 2010, a minor-planet moon was discovered around Sevastopol, orbiting at a distance of 26 kilometers with a diameter of 3.54 ± 0.17 km.

== Naming ==
The asteroid was named after the Crimean city on the 200th anniversary of its foundation. The approved naming citation was published by the Minor Planet Center on 28 January 1983 (M.P.C. 7616).
