= 3962 Valyaev =

Main-belt asteroid

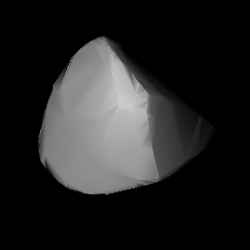
- Shape model of Valyaev from its lightcurve

Discovery
- Discovered by: T. Smirnova
- Discovery site: Crimean Astrophysical Obs.
- Discovery date: 8 February 1967

Designations
- Named after: Valerij Valyaev (Russian astronomer)
- Alternative designations: 1967 CC · 1973 GL_{1} 1976 UT_{10} · 1982 XE_{1} 1984 DC_{2}
- Minor planet category: main-belt · Themis

Orbital characteristics
- Epoch 4 September 2017 (JD 2458000.5)
- Uncertainty parameter 0
- Observation arc: 60.92 yr (22,251 days)
- Aphelion: 3.5778 AU
- Perihelion: 2.8406 AU
- Semi-major axis: 3.2092 AU
- Eccentricity: 0.1148
- Orbital period (sidereal): 5.75 yr (2,100 days)
- Mean anomaly: 293.47°
- Mean motion: 0° 10^{m} 17.04^{s} / day
- Inclination: 1.9984°
- Longitude of ascending node: 49.683°
- Argument of perihelion: 106.16°

Physical characteristics
- Mean diameter: 14.76±1.11 km 16.285±0.231 km
- Synodic rotation period: 16.4399±0.0077 h
- Geometric albedo: 0.08 (assumed); 0.088±0.014; 0.089±0.014
- Spectral type: C (assumed)
- Absolute magnitude (H): 12.2 · 12.4 · 12.403±0.005 (R) · 12.56±0.19 · 12.85

3962 Valyaev (prov. designation: 1967 CC) is a dark Themistian asteroid from the outer region of the asteroid belt. The presumed C-type asteroid has a rotation period of 16.4 hours and measures approximately 15 kilometers (9.3 miles) in diameter. It was discovered on 8 February 1967, by Russian astronomer Tamara Smirnova at Nauchnyj on the Crimean peninsula, and later named after Russian astronomer Valerij Valyaev.

== Classification and orbit ==
The C-type asteroid is a member of the Themis family, a dynamical family of outer-belt asteroids with nearly coplanar ecliptical orbits. It orbits the Sun at a distance of 2.8–3.6 AU once every 5 years and 9 months (2,100 days). Its orbit has an eccentricity of 0.11 and an inclination of 2° with respect to the ecliptic. A first precovery was obtained at Palomar Observatory in 1956, extending the asteroid's observation arc by 11 years prior to its discovery.

== Naming ==
This minor planet was named after Russian astronomer Valerij Valyaev (b. 1944), chief of the Ephemeris Astronomy Department at the Institute for Theoretical Astronomy (ITA), which was then part of the USSR Academy of Sciences in Leningrad. The minor planet 1735 ITA is named after this institute. Valyaev is also the senior editor of the periodicals Morskoj Astronomicheskij Ezhegodnik and Aviatsionnyj Astronomicheskij Ezhegodnik. The asteroids's name was proposed by ITA, and its official naming citation was published by the Minor Planet Center on 18 December 1994 (M.P.C. 24410).

== Physical characteristics ==
=== Rotation period ===
In September 2010, a rotational lightcurve of Valyaev was obtained from photometric observations by the Palomar Transient Factory survey in California. Lightcurve analysis gave a rotation period of 16.4399 hours with a brightness amplitude of 0.44 magnitude (U=2).

=== Diameter and albedo ===
According to the surveys carried out by the Japanese Akari satellite and the NEOWISE mission of NASA's Wide-field Infrared Survey Explorer, Valyaev measures 14.76 and 16.3 kilometers in diameter and its surface has a low albedo of 0.088 and 0.089, respectively. The Collaborative Asteroid Lightcurve Link (CALL) assumes an albedo for carbonaceous asteroids of 0.08 and calculates a smaller diameter of 12.6 kilometers with an absolute magnitude of 12.85.
