= 2139 Makharadze =

Rare-type main-belt asteroid

Discovery
- Discovered by: T. Smirnova
- Discovery site: Crimean Astrophysical Obs.
- Discovery date: 30 June 1970

Designations
- Named after: Ozurgeti (Georgian city)
- Alternative designations: 1970 MC · 1928 TF; 1955 SS_{1} · 1955 UA_{1} 1970 PJ · 1974 QN; 1977 ER_{1} · A924 RB
- Minor planet category: main-belt · Nysa-Polana complex

Orbital characteristics
- Epoch 4 September 2017 (JD 2458000.5)
- Uncertainty parameter 0
- Observation arc: 91.98 yr (33,594 days)
- Aphelion: 2.9242 AU
- Perihelion: 1.9997 AU
- Semi-major axis: 2.4619 AU
- Eccentricity: 0.1878
- Orbital period (sidereal): 3.86 yr (1,411 days)
- Mean anomaly: 54.791°
- Mean motion: 0° 15^{m} 18.36^{s} / day
- Inclination: 2.1801°
- Longitude of ascending node: 256.16°
- Argument of perihelion: 67.561°

Physical characteristics
- Dimensions: 8 km (calculated); 17.240±0.092 km
- Synodic rotation period: 11.9759 h
- Geometric albedo: 0.045±0.007
- Spectral type: Tholen = F · F B–V = 0.653; U–B = 0.231
- Absolute magnitude (H): 12.80

2139 Makharadze, provisional designation 1970 MC, is a rare-type asteroid from the inner region of the asteroid belt, approximately 14 kilometres (8.7 mi) in diameter. It was discovered on 30 June 1970, by Russian astronomer Tamara Smirnova at the Crimean Astrophysical Observatory in Nauchnyj.

== Orbit and classification ==
Makharadze belongs to the Nysa-Polana complex of asteroids. It orbits the Sun in the inner main-belt at a distance of 2.0–2.9 AU once every 3 years and 10 months (1,411 days). Its orbit has an eccentricity of 0.19 and an inclination of 2° with respect to the ecliptic.

== Physical characteristics ==
In the Tholen classification, Makharadze is a F-type asteroid. It has a rotation period of 11.9759 hours with a brightness variation of 0.38 magnitude.

== Naming ==
This minor planet was named after the Georgian city of Ozurgeti, formerly known as Makharadze. Makharadze is the twin city of Genichesk, Tamara Smirnova's Ukrainian birthplace. The approved naming citation was published on 8 February 1982 (M.P.C. 6647).
