= 2011 Veteraniya =

Asteroid

Discovery
- Discovered by: T. Smirnova
- Discovery site: Crimean Astrophysical Obs.
- Discovery date: 30 August 1970

Designations
- Named after: veterans (Soviet veterans of WWII)
- Alternative designations: 1970 QB_{1} · 1955 RE; 1955 SN_{1} · 1959 UA
- Minor planet category: main-belt · Vestian

Orbital characteristics
- Epoch 4 September 2017 (JD 2458000.5)
- Uncertainty parameter 0
- Observation arc: 67.05 yr (24,490 days)
- Aphelion: 2.7415 AU
- Perihelion: 2.0326 AU
- Semi-major axis: 2.3870 AU
- Eccentricity: 0.1485
- Orbital period (sidereal): 3.69 yr (1,347 days)
- Mean anomaly: 282.05°
- Mean motion: 0° 16^{m} 1.92^{s} / day
- Inclination: 6.1789°
- Longitude of ascending node: 338.52°
- Argument of perihelion: 3.7456°

Physical characteristics
- Dimensions: 5.193±0.646 km 7.46 km (calculated)
- Synodic rotation period: 8.209±0.005 h (Note: Hasegawa (2012) web: rotation period 8.209±0.005 hours with a brightness amplitude of 0.30 mag. Summary figures at Collaborative Asteroid Lightcurve Link (CALL) for (2011) Veteraniya)
- Geometric albedo: 0.20 (assumed); 0.463±0.100
- Spectral type: V · S
- Absolute magnitude (H): 12.9 · 13.0 · 13.55±0.23

2011 Veteraniya, provisional designation 1970 QB_{1}, is a stony Vestian asteroid from the inner regions of the asteroid belt, approximately 6 kilometers in diameter. It was discovered on 30 August 1970, by Soviet astronomer Tamara Smirnova at the Crimean Astrophysical Observatory, Nauchnyj, on the Crimean peninsula, and named for the Soviet veterans of the Second World War.

== Classification and orbit ==
Veteraniya is a member of the Vesta family. It orbits the Sun in the inner main-belt at a distance of 2.0–2.7 AU once every 3 years and 8 months (1,347 days). Its orbit has an eccentricity of 0.15 and an inclination of 6° with respect to the ecliptic. The first precovery was taken at Palomar Observatory in 1950, extending the asteroid's observation arc by 20 years prior to its discovery.

== Physical characteristics ==
The Collaborative Asteroid Lightcurve Link (CALL) and Pan-STARRS' large-scale survey classify it as a S-type and V-type asteroid, respectively.

According to the survey carried out by the NEOWISE mission of NASA's space-based Wide-field Infrared Survey Explorer, the asteroid's surface has an exceptionally high albedo of 0.46 and a corresponding diameter of 5.2 kilometers, while CALL assumes a standard albedo for stony asteroids of 0.20. CALL therefore calculates a larger diameter of 7.8 kilometers, as the lower the albedo (reflectivity), the higher the body's diameter at a constant absolute magnitude (brightness).

A photometric lightcurve analysis by Japanese astronomer Sunao Hasegawa in 2004 has given a rotation period of 8.209±0.005 hours with a brightness amplitude of 0.30 in magnitude.

== Naming ==
This minor planet was named in honor of the Soviet veterans of the Great Patriotic War. (The term is used in Russia to describe the conflict fought between the Soviet Union and Nazi Germany on the Eastern Front of World War II during 1941–1945.) The official naming citation was published by the Minor Planet Center on 1 September 1978 (M.P.C. 4481).
