= 2443 Tomeileen =

Stony Eoan asteroid from the outer regions of the asteroid belt

Discovery
- Discovered by: M. F. Wolf
- Discovery site: Heidelberg Obs.
- Discovery date: 24 January 1906

Designations
- Named after: parents of British astronomer Brian G. Marsden
- Alternative designations: A906 BJ · 1927 DD; 1934 PS · 1949 MV; 1950 RD_{1} · 1950 TF_{3} 1953 CH · 1953 EO; 1957 WH · 1959 JR; 1961 TE_{1} · 1961 TW_{1} 1965 OE · 1974 DQ_{1} 1974 FC_{1} · 1981 NN_{1}
- Minor planet category: main-belt · (outer); Eos

Orbital characteristics
- Epoch 23 March 2018 (JD 2458200.5)
- Uncertainty parameter 0
- Observation arc: 111.76 yr (40,821 d)
- Aphelion: 3.1804 AU
- Perihelion: 2.8297 AU
- Semi-major axis: 3.0050 AU
- Eccentricity: 0.0584
- Orbital period (sidereal): 5.21 yr (1,903 d)
- Mean anomaly: 138.10°
- Mean motion: 0° 11^{m} 21.12^{s} / day
- Inclination: 11.444°
- Longitude of ascending node: 118.77°
- Argument of perihelion: 68.441°

Physical characteristics
- Mean diameter: 28.44±0.76 km 30.89±1.6 km 31.878±0.412 km 34.07±0.65 km 37.577±0.236 km
- Synodic rotation period: 3.974 h 4.0±0.1 h (Note: Aznar (2011) web: observation from February 2010, rotation period 4.0±0.1 hours with a brightness amplitude of 0.10±0.02 mag. Quality code of 2. Summary figures for (2443) Tomeileen at the LCDB); 6.822±0.001 h
- Geometric albedo: 0.1042±0.0091; 0.127±0.005; 0.1539 (derived); 0.1541±0.017; 0.199±0.025
- Spectral type: S (SDSS-MFB) (Note: Search for Unusual Spectroscopic Candidates Among 40313 minor planets from the 3rd Release of the Sloan Digital Sky Survey Moving Object Catalog (publication). SDSS-MFB (Masi Foglia Binzel) taxonomy (catalog).)
- Absolute magnitude (H): 10.10 · 10.20; 10.34±0.41

2443 Tomeileen, provisional designation A906 BJ, is a stony Eoan asteroid from the outer regions of the asteroid belt, approximately 32 kilometers (20 miles) in diameter. It was discovered on 24 January 1906, by German astronomer Max Wolf at the Heidelberg-Königstuhl State Observatory in Heidelberg, Germany. The S-type asteroid was named after the parents of British astronomer Brian G. Marsden. It has a rotation period of 3.97 hours.

== Orbit and classification ==
Tomeileen is a member the Eos family (606), the largest asteroid family of the outer main belt consisting of nearly 10,000 asteroids. It orbits the Sun in the outer main-belt at a distance of 2.8–3.2 AU once every 5 years and 3 months (1,903 days; semi-major axis of 3.01 AU). Its orbit has an eccentricity of 0.06 and an inclination of 11° with respect to the ecliptic. The body's observation arc begins with its official discovery observation at Heidelberg in January 1906.

== Physical characteristics ==
Tomeileen has been characterized as a stony S-type asteroid in the SDSS-MFB (Masi Foglia Binzel) taxonomy.

=== Rotation period ===
Between 2004 and 2010, three rotational lightcurves of Tomeileen were obtained from photometric observations by Brazilian and Argentine astronomers, Amadeo Aznar at Puzol Observatory (J42), and Laurent Bernasconi in France. Lightcurve analysis gave a rotation period of 3.974, 4.0 and 6.822 hours with a brightness amplitude of 0.1, 0.10 and 0.13 magnitude, respectively (U=2/2/2). A low amplitude is indicative of a spherical rather than elongated shape.

=== Diameter and albedo ===
According to the surveys carried out by the Infrared Astronomical Satellite IRAS, the Japanese Akari satellite and the NEOWISE mission of NASA's Wide-field Infrared Survey Explorer, Tomeileen measures between 28.44 and 37.577 kilometers in diameter and its surface has an albedo between 0.1042 and 0.199.

The Collaborative Asteroid Lightcurve Link derives an albedo of 0.1539 and a diameter of kilometers based on an absolute magnitude of 10.2.

== Naming ==
This minor planet was named after Thomas Marsden (1905–1980) and Eileen (née West) Marsden (1905–1981), the parents of British astronomer and longtime director of the Minor Planet Center (MPC), Brian G. Marsden (1937–2010). The official naming citation was published by the MPC on 8 April 1982 (M.P.C. 6833).
