= 2009 Voloshina =

Carbonaceous asteroid

Discovery
- Discovered by: T. Smirnova
- Discovery site: Crimean Astrophysical Obs.
- Discovery date: October 22, 1968

Designations
- Named after: Vera Danilovna Voloshina (Soviet WWII partisan)
- Alternative designations: 1968 UL · 1926 FF; 1929 TO · 1957 WF_{2} 1959 EC · 1970 EL_{1} 1973 SP_{6} · 1973 SU_{3}
- Minor planet category: main-belt · (outer)

Orbital characteristics
- Epoch 4 September 2017 (JD 2458000.5)
- Uncertainty parameter 0
- Observation arc: 90.65 yr (33,111 days)
- Aphelion: 3.5594 AU
- Perihelion: 2.6725 AU
- Semi-major axis: 3.1160 AU
- Eccentricity: 0.1423
- Orbital period (sidereal): 5.50 yr (2,009 days)
- Mean anomaly: 261.36°
- Inclination: 2.8609°
- Longitude of ascending node: 107.55°
- Argument of perihelion: 6.2038°

Physical characteristics
- Dimensions: 21.19±9.05 km 26.558±0.476 km 28.04±0.72 km 34.67 km (derived); 34.8 km (IRAS)
- Synodic rotation period: 2.94±0.010 h 5.896±0.002 h 5.907±0.0547 h
- Geometric albedo: 0.0487 (derived); 0.0698±0.009; 0.11±0.11; 0.118±0.007; 0.120±0.024
- Spectral type: C
- Absolute magnitude (H): 10.8 · 10.870±0.120 (R) · 10.944±0.002 (R) · 11.2 · 11.29±0.32

2009 Voloshina, provisional designation 1968 UL, is a carbonaceous asteroid from the outer regions of the asteroid belt, approximately 27 kilometers in diameter.

It was discovered on 22 October 1968, by Russian astronomer Tamara Smirnova at the Crimean Astrophysical Observatory in Nauchnyj, on the Crimean peninsula. The asteroid was named for WWII partisan Vera Voloshina.

== Classification and orbit ==
Voloshina orbits the Sun in the outer main-belt at a distance of 2.7–3.6 AU once every 5 years and 6 months (2,009 days). Its orbit has an eccentricity of 0.14 and an inclination of 3° with respect to the ecliptic.

In March 1926, Voloshina was first observed as 1926 FF at Yerkes Observatory and one day later at Heidelberg Observatory. Its observation arc begins at Heidelberg, 62 years prior to its official discovery observation.

== Physical characteristics ==
Voloshina has been characterized as a carbonaceous C-type asteroid by Pan-STARRS photometric survey.

=== Lightcurves ===
In May 2009, a rotational lightcurve of Voloshina was obtained from photometric observations by astronomers at the Oakley Southern Sky Observatory (E09) in Australia. Lightcurve analysis gave a rotation period of 5.896 hours with a brightness variation of 0.40 magnitude (U=3-).

In January and February 2014, astronomers at the Palomar Transient Factory found a period of 2.94 and 5.907 hours with an amplitude of 0.32 and 0.27 magnitude, respectively (U=2/2).

=== Diameter and albedo ===
According to the surveys carried out by the Infrared Astronomical Satellite IRAS, the Japanese Akari satellite, and NASA's Wide-field Infrared Survey Explorer with its subsequent NEOWISE mission, Voloshina measures between 21.19 and 34.8 kilometers in diameter and its surface has an albedo between 0.0698 and 0.120.

The Collaborative Asteroid Lightcurve Link derives an albedo of 0.0487 and calculates a diameter of 34.67 kilometers based on an absolute magnitude of 11.2.

An occultation of a star by 2009 Voloshina was observed in 2021.

== Naming ==
This minor planet was named in honor of Vera Danilovna Voloshina (1919–1941), a partisan of the Soviet Great Patriotic War (1941–1945), also known as the Eastern Front of the Second World War. The official naming citation was published by the Minor Planet Center on 1 September 1978 (M.P.C. 4481).
