= 2997 Cabrera =

Main-belt asteroid

Discovery
- Discovered by: Felix Aguilar Obs.
- Discovery site: El Leoncito Complex
- Discovery date: 17 June 1974

Designations
- Named after: Ascención L. Cabrera (Argentine astronomer)
- Alternative designations: 1974 MJ · 1950 TA_{4} 1977 EZ_{7}
- Minor planet category: main-belt

Orbital characteristics
- Epoch 4 September 2017 (JD 2458000.5)
- Uncertainty parameter 0
- Observation arc: 66.61 yr (24,331 days)
- Aphelion: 3.0609 AU
- Perihelion: 2.0489 AU
- Semi-major axis: 2.5549 AU
- Eccentricity: 0.1980
- Orbital period (sidereal): 4.08 yr (1,492 days)
- Mean anomaly: 162.31°
- Mean motion: 0° 14^{m} 29.04^{s} / day
- Inclination: 7.1902°
- Longitude of ascending node: 355.12°
- Argument of perihelion: 349.90°

Physical characteristics
- Dimensions: 8.326±0.140
- Geometric albedo: 0.232±0.031
- Absolute magnitude (H): 12.7

2997 Cabrera, provisional designation 1974 MJ, is an asteroid from the central regions of the asteroid belt, approximately 8 kilometers in diameter.

It was discovered by the Felix Aguilar Observatory at Leoncito Astronomical Complex, Argentina, on 17 June 1974. It orbits the Sun in the central main-belt at a distance of 2.0–3.1 AU once every 4 years and 1 month (1,492 days). Its orbit has an eccentricity of 0.20 and an inclination of 7° with respect to the ecliptic.

It is named after Argentine astronomer Ascención Cabrera (1917–2003), long on the staff of the La Plata Observatory and collaborator at the Argentine National Observatory.
