= 2575 Bulgaria =

Stony Florian asteroid discovered in 1970

Discovery
- Discovered by: T. Smirnova
- Discovery site: Crimean Astrophysical Obs.
- Discovery date: 4 August 1970

Designations
- Named after: Bulgaria (European country)
- Alternative designations: 1970 PL · 1970 QD; 1977 RQ_{6} · 1980 PY; A923 PB
- Minor planet category: main-belt · Flora

Orbital characteristics
- Epoch 4 September 2017 (JD 2458000.5)
- Uncertainty parameter 0
- Observation arc: 93.80 yr (34,259 days)
- Aphelion: 2.5157 AU
- Perihelion: 1.9645 AU
- Semi-major axis: 2.2401 AU
- Eccentricity: 0.1230
- Orbital period (sidereal): 3.35 yr (1,225 days)
- Mean anomaly: 79.666°
- Mean motion: 0° 17^{m} 38.4^{s} / day
- Inclination: 4.6737°
- Longitude of ascending node: 321.99°
- Argument of perihelion: 287.29°

Physical characteristics
- Dimensions: 6.41±0.29 km 7.08 km (calculated); 8.010±0.065 km
- Synodic rotation period: 8.6157±0.0082 h 9.480±0.001 h
- Geometric albedo: 0.24 (assumed); 0.2521±0.0375; 0.392±0.060
- Spectral type: SMASS = Sr · S
- Absolute magnitude (H): 12.466±0.003 (R) · 12.6 · 12.7 · 12.92 · 13.31±0.29

2575 Bulgaria, provisional designation 1970 PL, is a stony Florian asteroid from the inner regions of the asteroid belt, approximately 7 kilometers in diameter. It was discovered on 4 August 1970, by Russian astronomer Tamara Smirnova at the Crimean Astrophysical Observatory in Nauchnyj, on the Crimean peninsula. It was named for country Bulgaria.

== Classification and orbit ==
Bulgaria is a member of the Flora family, one of the largest groups of stony asteroids in the main-belt. It orbits the Sun in the inner main-belt at a distance of 2.0–2.5 AU once every 3 years and 4 months (1,225 days). Its orbit has an eccentricity of 0.12 and an inclination of 5° with respect to the ecliptic.

== Physical characteristics ==
In the SMASS taxonomy, Bulgaria has been classified as a Sr-type, which transitions from common S-type asteroids to the rather rare R-type asteroids.

Bulgaria has a rotation period of 8.6 hours and an albedo of 0.24, as assumed by the Collaborative Asteroid Lightcurve Link.

== Naming ==
This minor planet was named after the European country Bulgaria. At the time of naming, it was the People's Republic of Bulgaria (1946–1990), a former satellite state of the Soviet Union and member of the Warsaw Pact. The official naming citation was published by the Minor Planet Center on 13 July 1984 (M.P.C. 8912).
