= Crimean Astrophysical Observatory =

Astrophysical observatory near Bakhchysarai, Crimea

- The observatory's logo
- Alternative names: Krymskai︠a︡ astrofizicheskai︠a︡ observatorii︠a︡
- Observatory code: 095
- Location: near Nauchnyi, Crimea
- Coordinates: 44°43′36″N 34°0′57.1″E
- Established: 1945
- Website: crao.ru/ru/

Telescopes
- TST-1: Solar telescope
- TST-2: Solar telescope
- Shain telescope: 2.6-metre telescope
- AZT-11: reflector
- 1.22-m: Babelsberg telescope
- AZT-8: reflector
- Related media on Commons

Minor planets discovered: 14
see § List of discovered minor planets

The Crimean Astrophysical Observatory (CrAO, observatory code: 095) is located at Nauchnij research campus, near the Central Crimean city of Bakhchysarai, on the Crimean peninsula. CrAO is often called simply by its location and campus name, Crimea–Nauchnij, still ranks among the worldwide most prolific discovery sites for minor planets.

CrAO has also been publishing the Bulletin of the Crimean Astrophysical Observatory since 1947, in English since 1977. The observatory facilities (IAU code 095) are located on territory of settlement of Nauchnyi since the mid-1950s; before that, they were further south, near Simeiz. The latter facilities still see some use, and are referred to as the Crimean Astrophysical Observatory–Simeiz (IAU code 094).

== Observatory leaders ==
- 1945–1952: Grigory Shajn - head of construction, the first director of the Observatory at Nauchny.
- 1952–1987: Andrei Severny.
- 1987–2005: Nikolai Steshenko.
- 2005 – present: Alla Rostopchina-Shakhovskaya (Romanova).

== List of discovered minor planets ==
As of 2016, the Minor Planet Center (MPC) gives a total of 1286 numbered minor planets that were discovered at the Crimea–Nauchnij observatory site during 1966–2007. Most of these discovery are credited to the Russian/Soviet astronomers Tamara Smirnova, Lyudmila Chernykh, Nikolai Chernykh, Lyudmila Zhuravleva, Bella A. Burnasheva, Nikolaj Efimovič Kuročkin, Lyudmila Karachkina, Natalʹja Vitalʹevna Metlova and Galina Ričardovna Kastelʹ. As a peculiarity, British astronomer and long-time MPC director Brian G. Marsden is also credited with the co-discovery of 37556 Svyaztie at Nauchnij in 1982, as a symbolic gesture of the astronomical collaborations and friendships between the East and the West during the Cold War.

The MPC also credits the discovery of the following minor planets directly to the observatory (rather than to one of the above listed astronomers):

2094 Magnitka	12 October 1971	list
2163 Korczak	16 September 1971	list
2170 Byelorussia	16 September 1971	list
2406 Orelskaya	20 August 1966	list
2698 Azerbajdzhan	11 October 1971	list
2949 Kaverznev	9 August 1970	list
4004 Listʹev	16 September 1971	list

4466 Abai	23 September 1971	list
4916 Brumberg	10 August 1970	list
4917 Yurilvovia	28 September 1973	list
5706 Finkelstein	23 September 1971	list
18284 Tsereteli	10 August 1970	list
109573 Mishasmirnov	20 August 2001	list
(364566) 2007 PM_{8}	10 August 2007	list

== Gallery ==
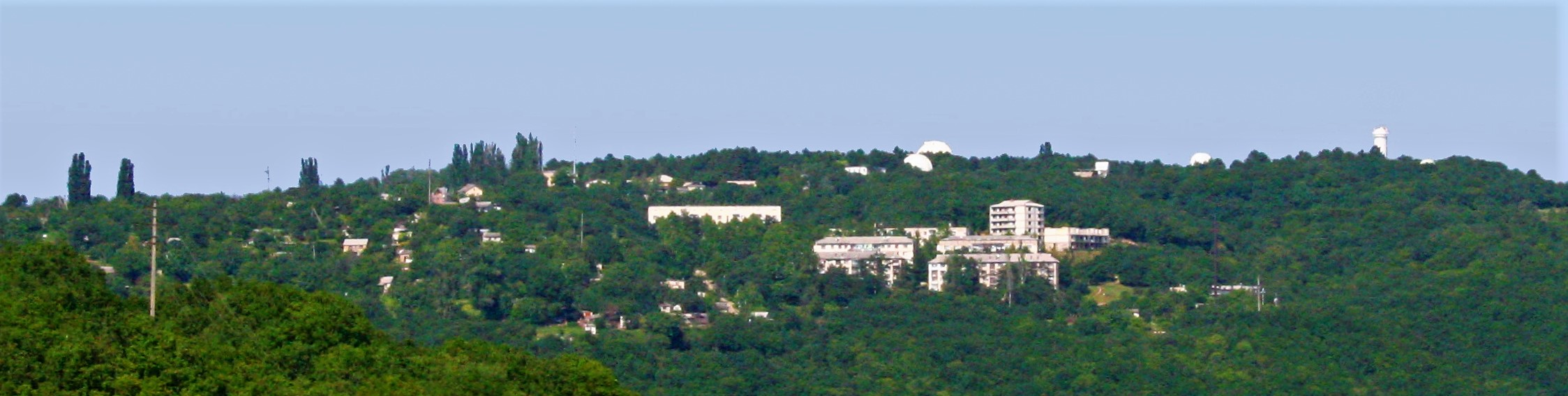
A view to the Crimean Astrophysical Observatory and Nauchnij from the nearby place called "Скалы" ("The Rocks"). Observatory domes seen above the line of horizon are (from left to right) 2.6-m ZTSH telescope, 1.25-m AZT-11 telescope, and BST-1 Solar telescope.

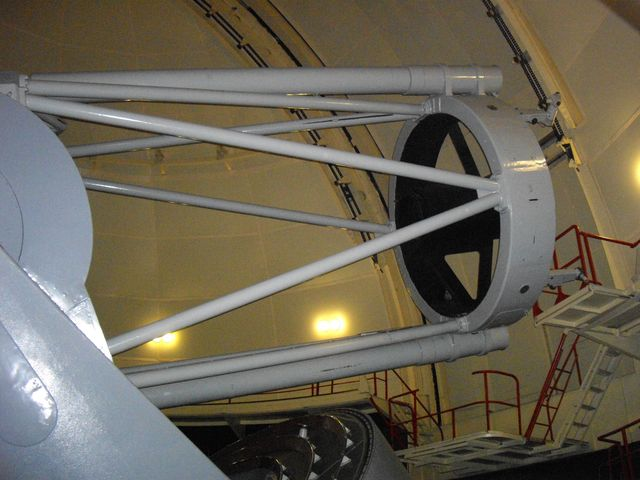
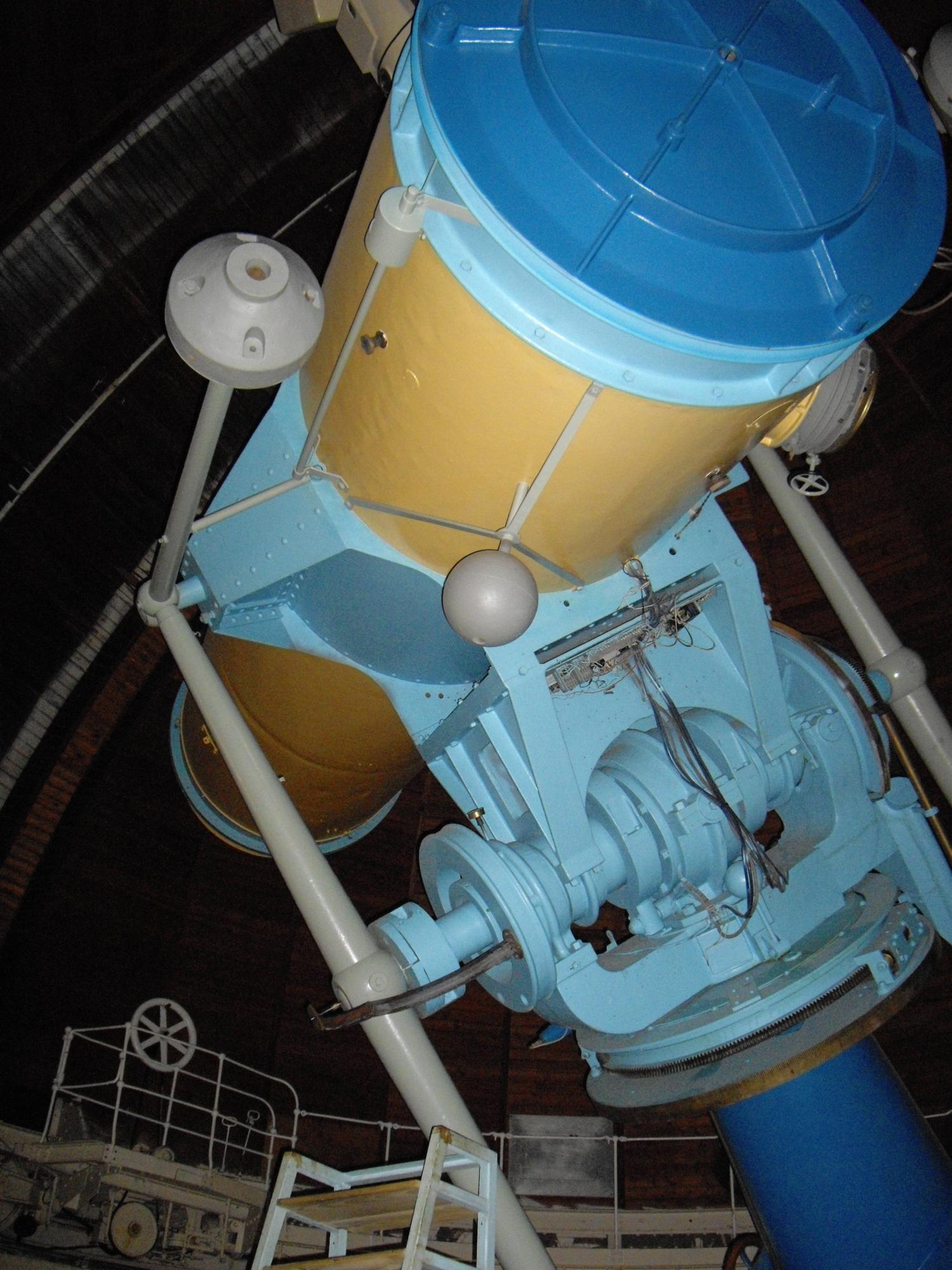
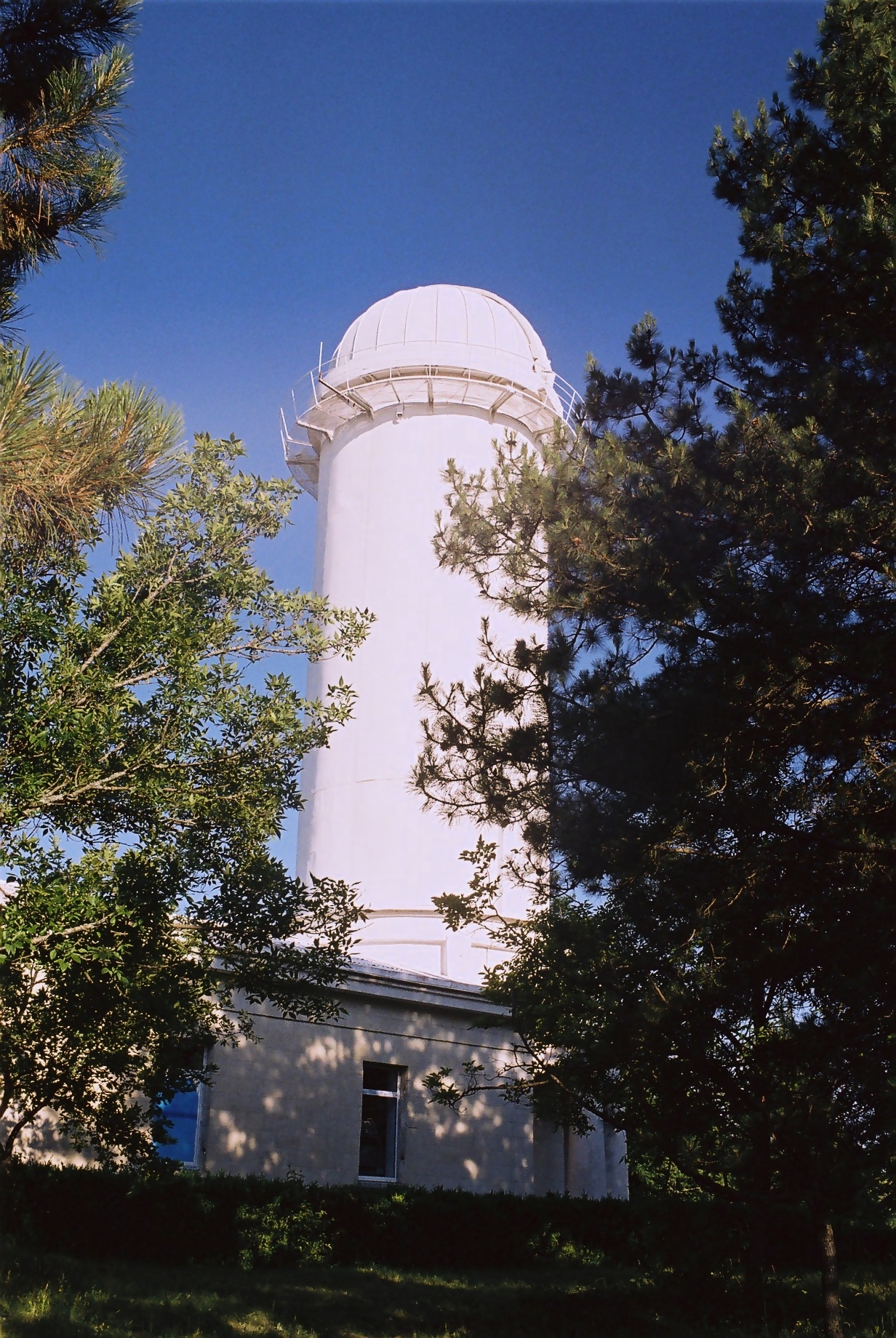
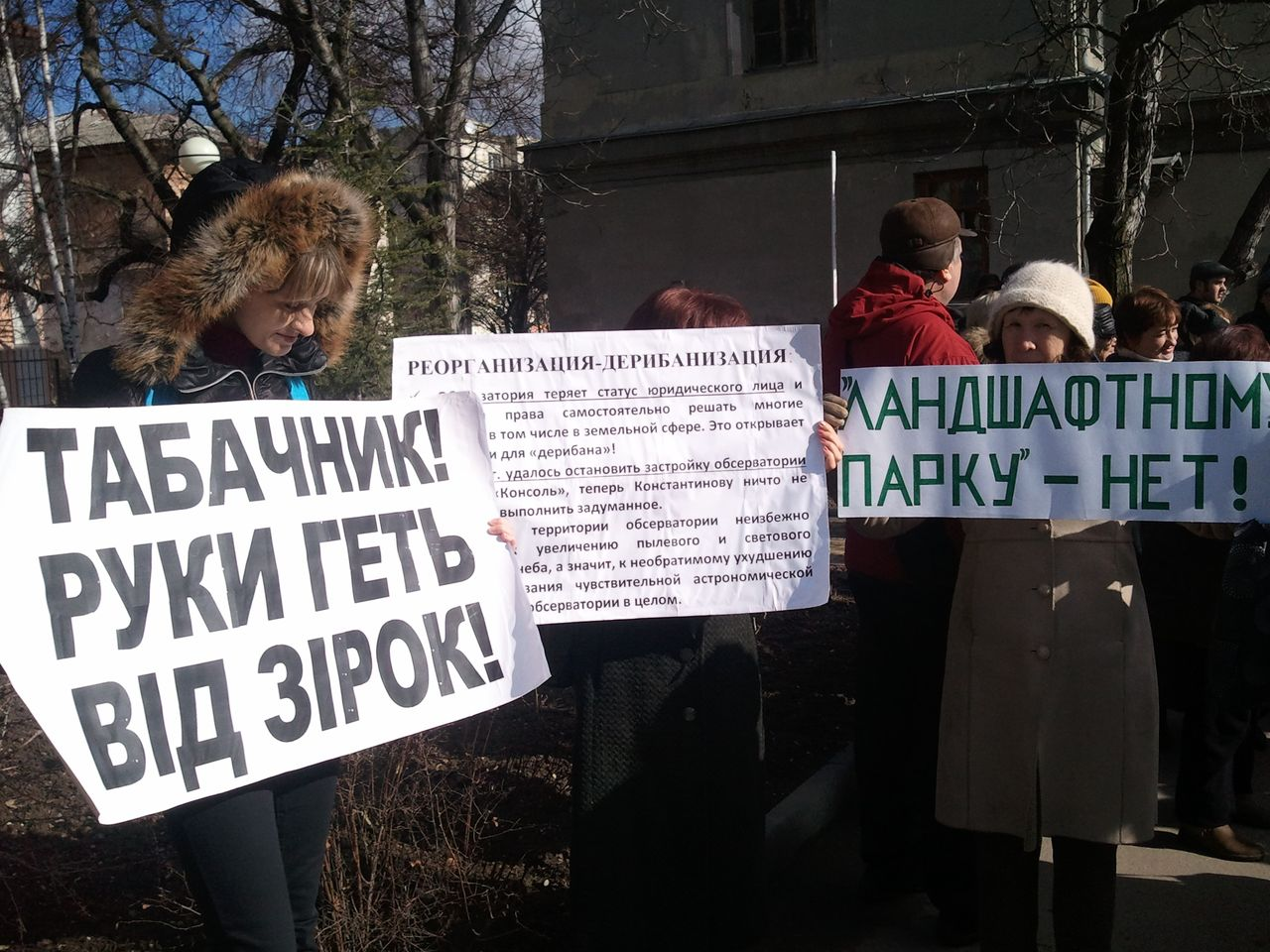
The large optical 2.6-metre Shajn telescope is named after Grigory Shajn (left); The 122-cm Babelsberg telescope and the BST-1 Solar telescope (middle); Rally for the rescue of the Crimean Astrophysical Observatory in 2013 (right).

== See also ==
The observatory's former logo

- List of asteroid-discovering observatories
- List of minor planet discoverers § Discovering dedicated institutions
- List of observatory codes
- Simeiz Observatory
