= 5635 Cole =

Main-belt asteroid

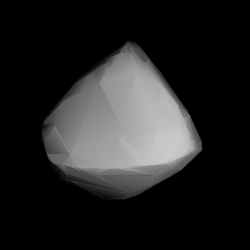
- Shape model of Cole from its lightcurve

Discovery
- Discovered by: S. J. Bus
- Discovery site: Siding Spring Obs.
- Discovery date: 2 March 1981

Designations
- Named after: Joshua Cole (fictional character)
- Alternative designations: 1981 ER_{5} · 1986 XC_{5} 1988 CO_{5}
- Minor planet category: main-belt · (inner) background

Orbital characteristics
- Epoch 23 March 2018 (JD 2458200.5)
- Uncertainty parameter 0
- Observation arc: 37.20 yr (13,588 d)
- Aphelion: 3.0272 AU
- Perihelion: 1.7431 AU
- Semi-major axis: 2.3851 AU
- Eccentricity: 0.2692
- Orbital period (sidereal): 3.68 yr (1,345 d)
- Mean anomaly: 248.82°
- Mean motion: 0° 16^{m} 3.36^{s} / day
- Inclination: 7.3102°
- Longitude of ascending node: 274.08°
- Argument of perihelion: 54.118°

Physical characteristics
- Mean diameter: 3.51±0.80 km 4.263±0.620 km 4.71 km (calculated)
- Synodic rotation period: 5.792±0.001 h 5.7937±0.0001 h
- Geometric albedo: 0.20 (assumed); 0.29±0.14; 0.294±0.100
- Spectral type: S (assumed); LS (SDSS-MOC)
- Absolute magnitude (H): 13.8; 14.0; 14.33

5635 Cole (prov. designation: 1981 ER_{5}) is a background asteroid from the inner regions of the asteroid belt, approximately 4 kilometers (2.5 miles) in diameter. It was discovered on 2 March 1981, by American astronomer Schelte Bus at the Siding Spring Observatory in Australia. The L/S-type asteroid has a rotation period of 5.79 hours. It was named after the fictional character Joshua Cole.

== Orbit and classification ==
Cole is a non-family asteroid of the main belt's background population when applying the hierarchical clustering method to its proper orbital elements. It orbits the Sun in the inner main-belt at a distance of 1.7–3.0 AU once every 3 years and 8 months (1,345 days; semi-major axis of 2.39 AU). Its orbit has an eccentricity of 0.27 and an inclination of 7° with respect to the ecliptic. The body's observation arc begins with a precovery taken at the discovering Siding Spring Observatory on 9 February 1981, or four weeks prior to its official discovery observation.

== Naming ==
This minor planet was named after fictional character Joshua Cole in the novel Cole of Spyglass Mountain (1923) by Arthur Preston Hankins. The protagonist, reminiscent of Oliver Twist, is an amateur astronomer in a dystopian society where boys receive numbers instead of names. In the novel, Cole's number is List of minor planets: 5001–6000#635 and corresponds to this asteroid's numbering. The official naming citation was prepared by David H. Levy and published by the Minor Planet Center on 14 December 1997 (M.P.C. 31024).

== Physical characteristics ==
In the Moving Object Catalog of the Sloan Digital Sky Survey, Cole has a spectral type is closest to an L-type asteroid followed by the common, stony S-type. The Collaborative Asteroid Lightcurve Link also assume it to be an S-type asteroid.

=== Rotation period ===
In September 2004, two rotational lightcurves of Cole were obtained from photometric observations by Donald Pray, Silvano Casulli, René Roy. Lightcurve analysis gave a well-defined rotation period of 5.792 and 5.7937 hours with a brightness amplitude of 0.33 and 0.30 magnitude, respectively (U=3/3).

=== Diameter and albedo ===
According to the survey carried out by the NEOWISE mission of NASA's Wide-field Infrared Survey Explorer, Cole measures between 3.51 and 4.263 kilometers in diameter and its surface has an albedo between 0.29 and 0.294, while the Collaborative Asteroid Lightcurve Link assumes a standard albedo for a stony asteroids of 0.20, and calculates a diameter of 4.71 kilometers based on an absolute magnitude of 14.0.
