= 2440 Educatio =

Main-belt asteroid

Discovery
- Discovered by: E. F. Helin; S. J. Bus
- Discovery site: Palomar Obs.
- Discovery date: 7 November 1978

Designations
- Pronunciation: /ɛdjuːˈkeɪʃioʊ/
- Named after: Education (ēducātio)
- Alternative designations: 1978 VQ_{4} · 1928 QH; 1954 JK · 1968 US_{1} 1977 JG
- Minor planet category: main-belt · (inner); Flora

Orbital characteristics
- Epoch 23 March 2018 (JD 2458200.5)
- Uncertainty parameter 0
- Observation arc: 89.43 yr (32,665 d)
- Aphelion: 2.5763 AU
- Perihelion: 1.8554 AU
- Semi-major axis: 2.2158 AU
- Eccentricity: 0.1627
- Orbital period (sidereal): 3.30 yr (1,205 d)
- Mean anomaly: 77.238°
- Mean motion: 0° 17^{m} 55.68^{s} / day
- Inclination: 4.1060°
- Longitude of ascending node: 227.20°
- Argument of perihelion: 77.865°

Physical characteristics
- Mean diameter: 6.586±0.128 km
- Synodic rotation period: 1561 h
- Geometric albedo: 0.247±0.039
- Spectral type: S (SMASS-II)
- Absolute magnitude (H): 13.1

2440 Educatio /ɛdjuːˈkeɪʃioʊ/ is a Florian asteroid from the inner regions of the asteroid belt, approximately 6.6 kilometers (4.1 miles) in diameter. The possibly elongated S-type asteroid has an exceptionally long rotation period of 1561 hours and is one of the slowest rotators known to exist. It was discovered on 7 November 1978, by American astronomers Eleanor Helin and Schelte Bus at the Palomar Observatory in California, and later named "Educatio", the Latin word for Education.

== Orbit and classification ==
Educatio member of the Flora family (402), a giant asteroid family and the largest family of stony asteroids in the main-belt. It orbits the Sun in the inner main-belt at a distance of 1.9–2.6 AU once every 3 years and 4 months (1,205 days; semi-major axis of 2.22 AU). Its orbit has an eccentricity of 0.16 and an inclination of 4° with respect to the ecliptic.

The asteroid was first observed as 1928 QH at the Simeiz Observatory in August 1928. The body's observation arc begins with its observation as 1954 JK at the Goethe Link Observatory in May 1954, more than 24 years prior to its official discovery observation at Palomar.

== Naming ==
This minor planet was named "Educatio", the Latin word for Education, one of the most important human endeavors, which is foremost to the industrialization of space. The official naming citation was published by the Minor Planet Center on 28 January 1983 (M.P.C. 7618).

== Physical characteristics ==
In the SMASS classification, Educatio is a stony S-type asteroid, which agrees with the overall spectral type for members of the Flora family.

=== Rotation period ===
A rotational lightcurve of Educatio, obtained from photometric observations, gave a rotation period of 1561 hours with a high brightness amplitude of 0.80 magnitude (U=2), indicative of a non-spherical shape. It belongs to the small group of slow rotators with a period above 1000 hours.

=== Diameter and albedo ===
According to the survey carried out by the NEOWISE mission of NASA's Wide-field Infrared Survey Explorer, Educatio measures 6.59 kilometers in diameter and its surface has an albedo of 0.247, while the Collaborative Asteroid Lightcurve Link an albedo of 0.24 – derived from 8 Flora, the parent body of the Flora family – and calculates a diameter of 6.51 kilometers based on an absolute magnitude of 13.1.
