= 9524 O'Rourke =

Asteroid

Discovery
- Discovered by: S. J. Bus
- Discovery site: Siding Spring Obs.
- Discovery date: 2 March 1981

Designations
- Named after: Laurence O'Rourke (ESAC researcher)
- Alternative designations: 1981 EJ_{5} · 1975 NU
- Minor planet category: main-belt · (inner)

Orbital characteristics
- Epoch 4 September 2017 (JD 2458000.5)
- Uncertainty parameter 0
- Observation arc: 41.90 yr (15,305 days)
- Aphelion: 2.6928 AU
- Perihelion: 1.7027 AU
- Semi-major axis: 2.1978 AU
- Eccentricity: 0.2253
- Orbital period (sidereal): 3.26 yr (1,190 days)
- Mean anomaly: 335.52°
- Mean motion: 0° 18^{m} 9^{s} / day
- Inclination: 4.9414°
- Longitude of ascending node: 286.97°
- Argument of perihelion: 9.9334°

Physical characteristics
- Dimensions: 2.920±0.662 km
- Geometric albedo: 0.273±0.087
- Absolute magnitude (H): 14.7

9524 O'Rourke, provisionally designated 1981 EJ_{5}, is an asteroid from the inner regions of the asteroid belt, approximately 3 kilometers in diameter. It was discovered on 2 March 1981, by American astronomer Schelte Bus at the Siding Spring Observatory in New South Wales, Australia. The asteroid was named after Laurence O'Rourke, a researcher at the European Space Astronomy Centre.

== Orbit and classification ==
O'Rourke orbits the Sun in the inner main-belt at a distance of 1.7–2.7 AU once every 3 years and 3 months (1,190 days). Its orbit has an eccentricity of 0.23 and an inclination of 5° with respect to the ecliptic. It was first observed as 1975 NU at Crimea–Nauchnij in 1975, extending the asteroid's observation arc by 6 years prior to its official discovery observation.

== Physical characteristics ==
According to the survey carried out by NASA's Wide-field Infrared Survey Explorer with its subsequent NEOWISE mission, the asteroid measures 2.920 kilometers in diameter and its surface has an albedo of 0.273.

As of 2017, O'Rourke's spectral type, as well as its rotation period and shape remain unknown.

== Naming ==
This minor planet was named after Laurence O'Rourke (born 1970), a researcher at the European Space Astronomy Centre in Madrid, Spain, and a coordinator of ESA's Rosetta mission. The approved naming citation was published by the Minor Planet Center on 12 July 2014 (M.P.C. 89078).
