= Schelte J. Bus =

American astronomer

Minor planets discovered: 1683
see Discoveries by Schelte Bus

Schelte John "Bobby" Bus (born 1956) is an American astronomer and discoverer of minor planets at the Institute for Astronomy of the University of Hawaiʻi and deputy director of NASA's Infrared Telescope Facility (IRTF) at the Mauna Kea Observatory in Hawaii, United States.

== Biography ==
Bus graduated in 1979 from California Institute of Technology with a BS. In 1999, he received his Ph.D. from the Massachusetts Institute of Technology. With MIT's Richard Binzel, Bus further added to the knowledge about main-belt asteroids in a spectroscopic survey published in 2002. This project was known as Small Main-Belt Asteroid Spectroscopic Survey, Phase II or SMASSII, which built on a previous survey of the main-belt asteroids. The visible-wavelength (435–925 nanometers) spectra data was gathered between August 1993 and March 1999. During his studies, he worked under the supervision of Eugene Shoemaker. As of 2017, Bus is an Astronomer at the University of Hawaii Institute for Astronomy and deputy director of NASA's Infrared Telescope Facility IRTF.

== Awards and honors ==
Asteroid 3254 Bus, which was discovered in 1982 by Edward Bowell, was named in his honor.

== Discoveries ==
In 1981, Bus discovered periodic comet 87P/Bus. Since 1975, he has also discovered or co-discovered over a thousand asteroids, including: an Apollo asteroid, 2135 Aristaeus, which will come within 13 lunar distances of the Earth on 30 March 2147; an Amor asteroid; and more than 40 Jupiter trojans. The first of these was 3240 Laocoon, which he co-discovered with Eleanor F. Helin. Bus was also the discoverer of asteroids 5020 Asimov and 4923 Clarke, named after two science fiction writers (see 5020 and 4923).

List of minor planets discovered by Schelte Bus

Name	Discovery Date	Listing
2135 Aristaeus	17 April 1977	list^{[A]}
2174 Asmodeus	8 October 1975	list^{[B]}
2285 Ron Helin	27 August 1976	list
2324 Janice	7 November 1978	list^{[A]}
2343 Siding Spring	25 June 1979	list^{[A]}
2392 Jonathan Murray	25 June 1979	list^{[A]}
2440 Educatio	7 November 1978	list^{[A]}
2441 Hibbs	25 June 1979	list^{[A]}
2499 Brunk	7 November 1978	list^{[A]}
2611 Boyce	7 November 1978	list^{[A]}
2618 Coonabarabran	25 June 1979	list^{[A]}
2619 Skalnaté Pleso	25 June 1979	list^{[A]}
2628 Kopal	25 June 1979	list^{[A]}
2682 Soromundi	25 June 1979	list^{[A]}
2704 Julian Loewe	25 June 1979	list^{[A]}
2725 David Bender	7 November 1978	list^{[A]}
2735 Ellen	13 September 1977	list^{[C]}
2780 Monnig	28 February 1981	list
2791 Paradise	13 February 1977	list
2884 Reddish	2 March 1981	list
2919 Dali	2 March 1981	list
2925 Beatty	7 November 1978	list^{[A]}
2980 Cameron	2 March 1981	list
2981 Chagall	2 March 1981	list
2990 Trimberger	2 March 1981	list
3000 Leonardo	2 March 1981	list
3029 Sanders	1 March 1981	list
3030 Vehrenberg	1 March 1981	list
3042 Zelinsky	1 March 1981	list
3058 Delmary	1 March 1981	list
3059 Pryor	3 March 1981	list
3075 Bornmann	1 March 1981	list
3122 Florence	2 March 1981	list
3129 Bonestell	25 June 1979	list^{[A]}
3135 Lauer	1 March 1981	list
3205 Boksenberg	25 June 1979	list^{[A]}
3207 Spinrad	2 March 1981	list
3240 Laocoon	7 November 1978	list^{[A]}
3252 Johnny	2 March 1981	list
3269 Vibert-Douglas	6 March 1981	list
3270 Dudley	18 February 1982	list^{[D]}
3287 Olmstead	28 February 1981	list
3304 Pearce	2 March 1981	list
3307 Athabasca	28 February 1981	list
3449 Abell	7 November 1978	list^{[A]}
3472 Upgren	1 March 1981	list
3498 Belton	1 March 1981	list
3503 Brandt	1 March 1981	list
3524 Schulz	2 March 1981	list
3528 Counselman	2 March 1981	list
3529 Dowling	2 March 1981	list
3530 Hammel	2 March 1981	list
3536 Schleicher	2 March 1981	list
3593 Osip	2 March 1981	list
3602 Lazzaro	28 February 1981	list
3619 Nash	2 March 1981	list
3651 Friedman	7 November 1978	list^{[A]}
3685 Derdenye	1 March 1981	list
3718 Dunbar	7 November 1978	list^{[A]}
3725 Valsecchi	1 March 1981	list
3741 Rogerburns	2 March 1981	list
3742 Sunshine	2 March 1981	list
3756 Ruscannon	25 June 1979	list^{[A]}
3805 Goldreich	28 February 1981	list
3806 Tremaine	1 March 1981	list
3817 Lencarter	25 June 1979	list^{[A]}
3891 Werner	3 March 1981	list
3926 Ramirez	7 November 1978	list^{[A]}
4012 Geballe	7 November 1978	list^{[A]}
4019 Klavetter	1 March 1981	list
4020 Dominique	1 March 1981	list
4052 Crovisier	28 February 1981	list
4069 Blakee	7 November 1978	list^{[A]}
4111 Lamy	1 March 1981	list
4240 Grün	2 March 1981	list
4241 Pappalardo	2 March 1981	list
4259 McCoy	16 September 1988	list
4275 Bogustafson	1 March 1981	list
4312 Knacke	29 November 1978	list^{[E]}
4314 Dervan	25 June 1979	list^{[A]}
4319 Jackierobinson	1 March 1981	list
4320 Jarosewich	1 March 1981	list
4321 Zero	2 March 1981	list
4322 Billjackson	11 March 1981	list
4364 Shkodrov	7 November 1978	list^{[A]}
4365 Ivanova	7 November 1978	list^{[A]}
4367 Meech	2 March 1981	list
4393 Dawe	7 November 1978	list^{[A]}
4394 Fritzheide	2 March 1981	list
4395 Danbritt	2 March 1981	list
4432 McGraw-Hill	2 March 1981	list
4473 Sears	28 February 1981	list
4517 Ralpharvey	30 September 1975	list
4523 MIT	28 February 1981	list
4550 Royclarke	24 April 1977	list
4564 Clayton	6 March 1981	list
4565 Grossman	2 March 1981	list
4595 Prinz	2 March 1981	list
4597 Consolmagno	30 October 1983	list
4656 Huchra	7 November 1978	list^{[A]}
4659 Roddenberry	2 March 1981	list
4716 Urey	30 October 1989	list
4731 Monicagrady	1 March 1981	list
4759 Åretta	7 November 1978	list^{[A]}
4794 Bogard	16 September 1988	list
4815 Anders	2 March 1981	list
4831 Baldwin	14 September 1988	list
4854 Edscott	2 March 1981	list
4886 Kojima	1 March 1981	list
4887 Takihiroi	2 March 1981	list
4922 Leshin	2 March 1981	list
4923 Clarke	2 March 1981	list
4924 Hiltner	2 March 1981	list
4965 Takeda	6 March 1981	list
4966 Edolsen	2 March 1981	list
4984 Patrickmiller	7 November 1978	list^{[A]}
4989 Joegoldstein	28 February 1981	list
4990 Trombka	2 March 1981	list
4991 Hansuess	1 March 1981	list
5019 Erfjord	25 June 1979	list^{[A]}
5020 Asimov	2 March 1981	list
5046 Carletonmoore	28 February 1981	list
5047 Zanda	2 March 1981	list
5223 McSween	6 March 1981	list
5233 Nastes	14 September 1988	list
5257 Laogonus	14 September 1988	list
5271 Kaylamaya	25 June 1979	list^{[A]}
5281 Lindstrom	6 September 1988	list
5305 Bernievolz	7 November 1978	list^{[A]}
5308 Hutchison	28 February 1981	list
5309 MacPherson	2 March 1981	list
5310 Papike	2 March 1981	list
5345 Boynton	1 March 1981	list
5366 Rhianjones	2 March 1981	list
5395 Shosasaki	14 September 1988	list
5416 Estremadoyro	7 November 1978	list^{[A]}
5476 Mulius	2 October 1989	list
5479 Grahamryder	30 October 1989	list
5497 Sararussell	30 September 1975	list
5634 Victorborge	7 November 1978	list^{[A]}
5635 Cole	2 March 1981	list
5662 Wendycalvin	2 March 1981	list
5663 McKeegan	1 March 1981	list
5664 Eugster	6 March 1981	list
5665 Begemann	30 January 1982	list
5760 Mittlefehldt	1 March 1981	list
5761 Andreivanov	2 March 1981	list
5762 Wänke	2 March 1981	list
5796 Klemm	7 November 1978	list^{[A]}
5798 Burnett	13 September 1980	list
5819 Lauretta	29 October 1989	list
5888 Ruders	7 November 1978	list^{[A]}
5907 Rhigmus	2 October 1989	list
5939 Toshimayeda	1 March 1981	list
5992 Nittler	28 February 1981	list
5993 Tammydickinson	2 March 1981	list
6030 Zolensky	7 March 1981	list
6058 Carlnielsen	7 November 1978	list^{[A]}
6079 Gerokurat	28 February 1981	list
6080 Lugmair	2 March 1981	list
6081 Cloutis	2 March 1981	list
6111 Davemckay	20 September 1979	list
6112 Ludolfschultz	28 February 1981	list
6169 Sashakrot	2 March 1981	list
6188 Robertpepin	16 September 1988	list
6203 Lyubamoroz	3 March 1981	list
6216 San Jose	30 September 1975	list
6224 El Goresy	1 March 1981	list
6225 Hiroko	1 March 1981	list
6226 Paulwarren	2 March 1981	list
6227 Alanrubin	2 March 1981	list
6284 Borisivanov	2 March 1981	list
6285 Ingram	2 March 1981	list
6361 Koppel	7 November 1978	list^{[A]}
6365 Nickschneider	1 March 1981	list
6366 Rainerwieler	24 October 1981	list
6443 Harpalion	14 September 1988	list
6466 Drewesquivel	25 June 1979	list^{[A]}
6468 Welzenbach	2 March 1981	list
6506 Klausheide	15 March 1978	list
6577 Torbenwolff	7 November 1978	list^{[A]}
6579 Benedix	2 March 1981	list
6580 Philbland	2 March 1981	list
6623 Trioconbrio	25 June 1979	list^{[A]}
6625 Nyquist	2 March 1981	list
6626 Mattgenge	2 March 1981	list
6688 Donmccarthy	2 March 1981	list
6689 Floss	2 March 1981	list
6756 Williamfeldman	7 November 1978	list^{[A]}
6757 Addibischoff	20 September 1979	list
6761 Haroldconnolly	2 March 1981	list
6762 Cyrenagoodrich	2 March 1981	list
6812 Robertnelson	7 November 1978	list^{[A]}
6813 Amandahendrix	7 November 1978	list^{[A]}
6814 Steffl	25 June 1979	list^{[A]}
6815 Mutchler	25 June 1979	list^{[A]}
6816 Barbcohen	2 March 1981	list
(6848) 1978 VG_{5}	7 November 1978	list^{[A]}
(6849) 1979 MX_{6}	25 June 1979	list^{[A]}
6892 Lana	7 November 1978	list^{[A]}
6899 Nancychabot	14 September 1988	list
6943 Moretto	7 November 1978	list^{[A]}
6944 Elaineowens	25 June 1979	list^{[A]}
6947 Andrewdavis	1 March 1981	list
6948 Gounelle	2 March 1981	list
7004 Markthiemens	24 July 1979	list
7005 Henninghaack	2 March 1981	list
7006 Folco	2 March 1981	list
7007 Timjull	2 March 1981	list
7048 Chaussidon	2 March 1981	list
7049 Meibom	24 October 1981	list
7154 Zhangmaolin	25 June 1979	list^{[A]}
7157 Lofgren	1 March 1981	list
7158 IRTF	1 March 1981	list
7159 Bobjoseph	1 March 1981	list
7160 Tokunaga	24 October 1981	list
7219 Satterwhite	3 March 1981	list
7273 Garyhuss	2 March 1981	list
(7321) 1979 MZ_{2}	25 June 1979	list^{[A]}
7326 Tedbunch	24 October 1981	list
(7371) 1978 VA_{6}	7 November 1978	list^{[A]}
7376 Jefftaylor	31 October 1980	list
7377 Pizzarello	1 March 1981	list
7378 Herbertpalme	2 March 1981	list
7379 Naoyaimae	1 March 1981	list
7454 Kevinrighter	2 March 1981	list
7455 Podosek	2 March 1981	list
7511 Patcassen	2 March 1981	list
7546 Meriam	25 June 1979	list^{[A]}
7547 Martinnakata	25 June 1979	list^{[A]}
7550 Woolum	1 March 1981	list
7551 Edstolper	2 March 1981	list
7552 Sephton	2 March 1981	list
7565 Zipfel	14 September 1988	list
7630 Yidumduma	25 June 1979	list^{[A]}
7692 Edhenderson	2 March 1981	list
7732 Ralphpass	7 November 1978	list^{[A]}
7733 Segarpassi	25 June 1979	list^{[A]}
7734 Kaltenegger	25 June 1979	list^{[A]}
7735 Scorzelli	31 October 1980	list
7754 Gopalan	2 October 1989	list
7807 Grier	30 September 1975	list
7809 Marcialangton	25 June 1979	list^{[A]}
7817 Zibiturtle	14 September 1988	list
7861 Messenger	2 March 1981	list
7862 Keikonakamura	2 March 1981	list
7909 Ziffer	30 September 1975	list
7915 Halbrook	25 June 1979	list^{[A]}
7917 Hammergren	2 March 1981	list
7918 Berrilli	2 March 1981	list
7919 Prime	2 March 1981	list
7981 Katieoakman	7 November 1978	list^{[A]}
7982 Timmartin	25 June 1979	list^{[A]}
7985 Nedelcu	1 March 1981	list
7986 Romania	1 March 1981	list
7987 Walshkevin	2 March 1981	list
7988 Pucacco	2 March 1981	list
7989 Pernadavide	2 March 1981	list
8063 Cristinathomas	7 December 1977	list
8068 Vishnureddy	6 March 1981	list
8069 Benweiss	2 March 1981	list
8070 DeMeo	2 March 1981	list
8129 Michaelbusch	30 September 1975	list
8135 Davidmitchell	7 November 1978	list^{[A]}
8136 Landis	25 June 1979	list^{[A]}
8139 Paulabell	31 October 1980	list
8140 Hardersen	1 March 1981	list
8242 Joshemery	30 September 1975	list
8243 Devonburr	30 September 1975	list
8245 Molnar	8 September 1977	list
8247 Cherylhall	20 September 1979	list
8252 Elkins-Tanton	1 March 1981	list
8253 Brunetto	1 March 1981	list
8254 Moskovitz	2 March 1981	list
8255 Masiero	2 March 1981	list
8324 Juliadeleón	28 February 1981	list
8325 Trigo-Rodriguez	2 March 1981	list
8331 Dawkins	27 May 1982	list^{[D]}
8455 Johnrayner	6 March 1981	list
8456 Davegriep	1 March 1981	list
8457 Billgolisch	1 March 1981	list
8458 Georgekoenig	1 March 1981	list
8459 Larsbergknut	2 March 1981	list
8460 Imainamahoe	2 March 1981	list
8461 Sammiepung	2 March 1981	list
8462 Hazelsears	2 March 1981	list
8463 Naomimurdoch	2 March 1981	list
8464 Polishook	2 March 1981	list
8465 Bancelin	2 March 1981	list
8466 Leyrat	2 March 1981	list
8467 Benoîtcarry	2 March 1981	list
8468 Rhondastroud	2 March 1981	list
8482 Wayneolm	14 September 1988	list
8483 Kinwalaniihsia	16 September 1988	list
8611 Judithgoldhaber	18 October 1977	list
8613 Cindyschulz	7 November 1978	list^{[A]}
(8614) 1978 VP_{11}	7 November 1978	list^{[A]}
8615 Philipgrahamgood	25 June 1979	list^{[A]}
8618 Sethjacobson	28 February 1981	list
8620 Lowkevrudolph	2 March 1981	list
8621 Jimparsons	1 March 1981	list
8622 Mayimbialik	1 March 1981	list
8623 Johnnygalecki	1 March 1981	list
8624 Kaleycuoco	1 March 1981	list
8625 Simonhelberg	1 March 1981	list
8626 Melissarauch	2 March 1981	list
8627 Kunalnayyar	2 March 1981	list
8628 Davidsaltzberg	2 March 1981	list
8629 Chucklorre	2 March 1981	list
8630 Billprady	2 March 1981	list
8631 Sherikboonstra	2 March 1981	list
8633 Keisukenagao	16 March 1981	list
8642 Shawnkerry	14 September 1988	list
8789 Effertz	7 November 1978	list^{[A]}
8790 Michaelamato	7 November 1978	list^{[A]}
8791 Donyabradshaw	7 November 1978	list^{[A]}
8792 Christyljohnson	7 November 1978	list^{[A]}
8794 Joepatterson	6 March 1981	list
8795 Dudorov	1 March 1981	list
8796 Sonnett	7 March 1981	list
8797 Duffard	2 March 1981	list
8798 Tarantino	7 March 1981	list
8799 Barnouin	2 March 1981	list
8800 Brophy	2 March 1981	list
8801 Nugent	1 March 1981	list
8802 Negley	2 March 1981	list
8803 Kolyer	2 March 1981	list
8807 Schenk	24 October 1981	list
8808 Luhmann	24 October 1981	list
8829 Buczkowski	14 September 1988	list
8987 Cavancuddy	7 November 1978	list^{[A]}
8988 Hansenkoharcheck	25 June 1979	list^{[A]}
8995 Rachelstevenson	1 March 1981	list
8996 Waynedwards	1 March 1981	list
8997 Davidblewett	1 March 1981	list
8998 Matthewizawa	3 March 1981	list
8999 Tashadunn	2 March 1981	list
9003 Ralphmilliken	24 October 1981	list
9025 Polanskey	16 September 1988	list
9026 Denevi	16 September 1988	list
9030 Othryoneus	30 October 1989	list
9151 Kettnergriswold	25 June 1979	list^{[A]}
9152 Combe	1 November 1980	list
9268 Jeremihschneider	7 November 1978	list^{[A]}
9269 Peterolufemi	7 November 1978	list^{[A]}
9270 Sherryjennings	7 November 1978	list^{[A]}
9271 Trimble	7 November 1978	list^{[A]}
9276 Timgrove	13 September 1980	list
9279 Seager	1 March 1981	list
9280 Stevenjoy	1 March 1981	list
9281 Weryk	1 March 1981	list
9282 Lucylim	6 March 1981	list
9283 Martinelvis	2 March 1981	list
9284 Juansanchez	7 March 1981	list
9285 Le Corre	2 March 1981	list
9286 Patricktaylor	2 March 1981	list
9287 Klima	6 March 1981	list
9288 Santos-Sanz	2 March 1981	list
9319 Hartzell	14 September 1988	list
9519 Jeffkeck	6 November 1978	list^{[A]}
9520 Montydibiasi	7 November 1978	list^{[A]}
9522 Schlichting	28 February 1981	list
9524 O'Rourke	2 March 1981	list
9525 Amandasickafoose	1 March 1981	list
9526 Billmckinnon	1 March 1981	list
9527 Sherrypervan	3 March 1981	list
9528 Küppers	7 March 1981	list
9529 Protopapa	2 March 1981	list
9530 Kelleymichael	2 March 1981	list
9536 Statler	24 October 1981	list
9715 Paolotanga	30 September 1975	list
9723 Binyang	1 March 1981	list
9724 Villanueva	2 March 1981	list
9725 Wainscoat	2 March 1981	list
9726 Verbiscer	2 March 1981	list
9727 Skrutskie	2 March 1981	list
9728 Videen	2 March 1981	list
9830 Franciswasiak	7 November 1978	list^{[A]}
9832 Xiaobinwang	2 March 1981	list
9918 Timtrenkle	25 June 1979	list^{[A]}
9920 Bagnulo	1 March 1981	list
9921 Rubincam	2 March 1981	list
9922 Catcheller	2 March 1981	list
9923 Ronaldthiel	7 March 1981	list
9924 Corrigan	2 March 1981	list
9925 Juliehoskin	2 March 1981	list
9926 Desch	2 March 1981	list
10018 Lykawka	25 June 1979	list^{[A]}
10019 Wesleyfraser	25 June 1979	list^{[A]}
10020 Bagenal	24 July 1979	list
10032 Hans-Ulrich	3 September 1981	list
10033 Bodewits	24 October 1981	list
10063 Erinleeryan	16 September 1988	list
10267 Giuppone	7 November 1978	list^{[A]}
10272 Yuko	1 March 1981	list
10273 Katvolk	1 March 1981	list
10274 Larryevans	1 March 1981	list
10275 Nathankaib	1 March 1981	list
10276 Matney	3 March 1981	list
10277 Micheli	2 March 1981	list
10278 Virkki	2 March 1981	list
10279 Rhiannonblaauw	2 March 1981	list
10280 Yequanzhi	2 March 1981	list
10281 Libourel	11 March 1981	list
10282 Emilykramer	2 March 1981	list
10296 Rominadisisto	14 September 1988	list
10297 Lynnejones	14 September 1988	list
10298 Jiangchuanhuang	16 September 1988	list
10460 Correa-Otto	7 November 1978	list^{[A]}
10463 Bannister	25 June 1979	list^{[A]}
10465 Olkin	29 November 1980	list
10466 Marius-Ioan	1 March 1981	list
10467 Peterbus	1 March 1981	list
10468 Itacuruba	1 March 1981	list
10469 Krohn	1 March 1981	list
10470 Bartczak	2 March 1981	list
10471 Marciniak	2 March 1981	list
10472 Santana-Ros	2 March 1981	list
10473 Thirouin	2 March 1981	list
10474 Pecina	3 March 1981	list
10475 Maxpoilâne	1 March 1981	list
10476 Los Molinos	2 March 1981	list
10477 Lacumparsita	2 March 1981	list
10512 Yamandu	2 October 1989	list
10673 Berezhnoy	7 November 1978	list^{[A]}
10674 de Elía	7 November 1978	list^{[A]}
10676 Jamesmcdanell	25 June 1979	list^{[A]}
10677 Colucci	25 June 1979	list^{[A]}
10678 Alilagoa	25 June 1979	list^{[A]}
10679 Chankaochang	25 June 1979	list^{[A]}
10680 Ermakov	25 June 1979	list^{[A]}
10686 Kaluna	1 November 1980	list
10688 Haghighipour	28 February 1981	list
10689 Pinillaalonso	28 February 1981	list
10690 Massera	28 February 1981	list
10691 Sans	2 March 1981	list
10692 Opeil	2 March 1981	list
10693 Zangari	2 March 1981	list
10694 Lacerda	2 March 1981	list
10695 Yasunorifujiwara	2 March 1981	list
10696 Giuliattiwinter	2 March 1981	list
10697 Othonwinter	2 March 1981	list
10698 Singer	3 March 1981	list
10699 Calabrese	6 March 1981	list
10700 Juanangelviera	2 March 1981	list
10707 Prunariu	24 October 1981	list
10708 Richardspalding	25 October 1981	list
10741 Valeriocarruba	16 September 1988	list
10994 Fouchard	15 March 1978	list
10996 Armandspitz	7 July 1978	list
10999 Braga-Ribas	7 November 1978	list^{[A]}
(11000) 1978 VE_{6}	6 November 1978	list^{[A]}
11002 Richardlis	24 June 1979	list^{[A]}
11007 Granahan	1 November 1980	list
11008 Ernst	1 March 1981	list
11009 Sigridclose	1 March 1981	list
11010 Artemieva	2 March 1981	list
11033 Mazanek	16 September 1988	list
11259 Yingtungchen	7 November 1978	list^{[A]}
11260 Camargo	7 November 1978	list^{[A]}
11262 Drube	25 June 1979	list^{[A]}
11265 Hasselmann	2 March 1981	list
11266 Macke	2 March 1981	list
11267 Donaldkessler	24 October 1981	list
(11273) 1988 RN_{11}	14 September 1988	list
11274 Castillo-Rogez	16 September 1988	list
(11275) 1988 SL_{3}	16 September 1988	list
11440 Massironi	30 September 1975	list
11448 Miahajduková	25 June 1979	list^{[A]}
11453 Cañada-Assandri	28 February 1981	list
11454 Mariomelita	28 February 1981	list
11455 Richardstarr	2 March 1981	list
11456 Cotto-Figueroa	1 March 1981	list
11457 Hitomikobayashi	1 March 1981	list
11458 Rosemarypike	1 March 1981	list
11459 Andráspál	1 March 1981	list
11460 Juliafang	1 March 1981	list
11461 Wladimirneumann	2 March 1981	list
11462 Hsingwenlin	3 March 1981	list
11463 Petrpokorny	2 March 1981	list
11464 Moser	6 March 1981	list
11465 Fulvio	2 March 1981	list
11466 Katharinaotto	1 March 1981	list
11467 Simonporter	3 March 1981	list
11468 Shantanunaidu	2 March 1981	list
11469 Rozitis	2 March 1981	list
11470 Davidminton	2 March 1981	list
11471 Toshihirabayashi	6 March 1981	list
(11487) 1988 RG_{10}	14 September 1988	list
(11488) 1988 RM_{11}	14 September 1988	list
11794 Yokokebukawa	7 November 1978	list^{[A]}
11799 Lantz	28 February 1981	list
11800 Carrozzo	28 February 1981	list
11801 Frigeri	2 March 1981	list
11802 Ivanovski	1 March 1981	list
11803 Turrini	1 March 1981	list
11804 Zambon	1 March 1981	list
11805 Novaković	1 March 1981	list
11806 Thangjam	1 March 1981	list
11807 Wannberg	1 March 1981	list
11808 Platz	1 March 1981	list
11809 Shinnaka	2 March 1981	list
11810 Preusker	2 March 1981	list
11811 Martinrubin	2 March 1981	list
11812 Dongqiao	2 March 1981	list
11813 Ingorichter	3 March 1981	list
11814 Schwamb	2 March 1981	list
11815 Viikinkoski	2 March 1981	list
11816 Vasile	1 March 1981	list
11817 Oguri	2 March 1981	list
11818 Ulamec	2 March 1981	list
11819 Millarca	2 March 1981	list
11820 Mikiyasato	1 March 1981	list
11821 Coleman	6 March 1981	list
11858 Devinpoland	14 September 1988	list
11859 Danngarcia	16 September 1988	list
(11869) 1989 TS_{2}	3 October 1989	list
12183 Caltonen	30 September 1975	list
12184 Trevormerkley	30 September 1975	list
12192 Gregbollendonk	7 November 1978	list^{[A]}
12195 Johndavidniemann	25 June 1979	list^{[A]}
12196 Weems	25 June 1979	list^{[A]}
12200 Richlipe	1 March 1981	list
12201 Spink	1 March 1981	list
12202 Toddgregory	1 March 1981	list
12203 Gehling	2 March 1981	list
12204 Jonpineau	2 March 1981	list
12205 Basharp	2 March 1981	list
12206 Prats	2 March 1981	list
12207 Matthewbeasley	1 March 1981	list
12208 Jacobenglander	2 March 1981	list
(12209) 1981 EF_{37}	11 March 1981	list
12210 Prykull	2 March 1981	list
12215 Jessicalounsbury	24 October 1981	list
12247 Michaelsekerak	14 September 1988	list
12248 Russellcarpenter	14 September 1988	list
(12249) 1988 SH_{2}	16 September 1988	list
12665 Chriscarson	6 November 1978	list^{[A]}
12668 Scottstarin	25 June 1979	list^{[A]}
12669 Emilybrisnehan	25 June 1979	list^{[A]}
12676 Dianemerline	28 February 1981	list
12677 Gritsavage	2 March 1981	list
12678 Gerhardus	2 March 1981	list
12679 Jamessimpson	2 March 1981	list
12681 Pevear	24 October 1981	list
12980 Pruetz	6 November 1978	list^{[A]}
12981 Tracicase	7 November 1978	list^{[A]}
12982 Kaseybond	25 June 1979	list^{[A]}
12983 Mattcox	24 July 1979	list
12985 Mattgarrison	31 October 1980	list
12986 Kretke	28 February 1981	list
12988 Tiffanykapler	2 March 1981	list
12989 Chriseanderson	1 March 1981	list
12990 Josetillard	6 March 1981	list
12991 Davidgriffiths	2 March 1981	list
(12992) 1981 EZ_{22}	2 March 1981	list
(12993) 1981 EP_{27}	2 March 1981	list
(12994) 1981 ET_{27}	2 March 1981	list
(12995) 1981 EY_{27}	2 March 1981	list
(12996) 1981 EV_{28}	1 March 1981	list
(12997) 1981 EV_{29}	2 March 1981	list
(12998) 1981 EB_{43}	2 March 1981	list
(13002) 1982 BJ_{13}	30 January 1982	list
(13035) 1989 UA_{6}	30 October 1989	list
(13481) 1978 VM_{11}	6 November 1978	list^{[A]}
(13484) 1981 EA_{16}	1 March 1981	list
13486 Morgangibson	24 October 1981	list
(13504) 1988 RV_{12}	14 September 1988	list
13903 Darrylwatanabe	30 September 1975	list
13905 Maxbernstein	27 August 1976	list
(13909) 1978 VD_{8}	7 November 1978	list^{[A]}
13910 Iranolt	25 June 1979	list^{[A]}
13915 Yalow	27 May 1982	list^{[D]}
13931 Tonydenault	14 September 1988	list
(14321) 1978 VT_{9}	7 November 1978	list^{[A]}
(14323) 1979 MV_{1}	25 June 1979	list^{[A]}
(14324) 1979 MK_{6}	25 June 1979	list^{[A]}
(14325) 1979 MM_{6}	25 June 1979	list^{[A]}
(14329) 1981 EY_{10}	1 March 1981	list
(14330) 1981 EG_{21}	2 March 1981	list
(14331) 1981 EC_{26}	2 March 1981	list
14332 Brucebarnett	2 March 1981	list
14333 Alanfischer	1 March 1981	list
14334 Lindarueger	1 March 1981	list
(14336) 1981 UU_{29}	24 October 1981	list
(14380) 1989 UC_{6}	30 October 1989	list
(14793) 1975 SE_{2}	30 September 1975	list
(14796) 1977 XF_{2}	7 December 1977	list
(14797) 1977 XZ_{2}	7 December 1977	list
14799 Mitchschulte	25 June 1979	list^{[A]}
(14800) 1979 MP_{4}	25 June 1979	list^{[A]}
(14802) 1981 DJ_{2}	28 February 1981	list
(14803) 1981 EL_{7}	1 March 1981	list
(14804) 1981 EW_{13}	1 March 1981	list
(14805) 1981 ED_{15}	1 March 1981	list
(14806) 1981 EV_{25}	2 March 1981	list
(14807) 1981 EN_{26}	2 March 1981	list
(14808) 1981 EV_{27}	2 March 1981	list
(14809) 1981 ES_{28}	6 March 1981	list
(14810) 1981 EM_{31}	2 March 1981	list
(14811) 1981 ED_{43}	2 March 1981	list
(14816) 1981 UQ_{22}	24 October 1981	list
(14840) 1988 RR_{11}	14 September 1988	list
(15200) 1975 SU	30 September 1975	list
(15205) 1978 VC_{4}	7 November 1978	list^{[A]}
(15206) 1978 VJ_{6}	6 November 1978	list^{[A]}
(15208) 1979 MW_{1}	25 June 1979	list^{[A]}
(15209) 1979 ML_{2}	25 June 1979	list^{[A]}
(15210) 1979 MU_{2}	25 June 1979	list^{[A]}
(15211) 1979 MW_{3}	25 June 1979	list^{[A]}
(15213) 1980 UO_{1}	31 October 1980	list
(15214) 1981 DY	28 February 1981	list
(15215) 1981 EH_{13}	1 March 1981	list
(15216) 1981 EX_{14}	1 March 1981	list
(15217) 1981 ET_{19}	2 March 1981	list
(15218) 1981 EO_{41}	2 March 1981	list
(15219) 1981 EY_{42}	2 March 1981	list
(15221) 1981 UA_{23}	24 October 1981	list
(15670) 1975 SO_{1}	30 September 1975	list
(15678) 1981 DM	28 February 1981	list
(15679) 1981 DA_{1}	28 February 1981	list
(15680) 1981 EV_{7}	1 March 1981	list
(15681) 1981 ES_{17}	2 March 1981	list
(15682) 1981 EB_{25}	2 March 1981	list
(15683) 1981 EX_{25}	2 March 1981	list
(15684) 1981 ED_{28}	2 March 1981	list
(15685) 1981 EU_{33}	1 March 1981	list
(15686) 1981 EW_{33}	1 March 1981	list
(15687) 1981 ES_{38}	1 March 1981	list
(15688) 1981 UW_{23}	24 October 1981	list
(15689) 1981 UP_{25}	25 October 1981	list
(15708) 1988 RB_{12}	14 September 1988	list
(16354) 1975 SN_{1}	30 September 1975	list
(16359) 1978 VO_{4}	7 November 1978	list^{[A]}
(16360) 1978 VY_{5}	7 November 1978	list^{[A]}
(16361) 1979 MS_{1}	25 June 1979	list^{[A]}
(16362) 1979 MJ_{4}	25 June 1979	list^{[A]}
(16363) 1979 MT_{4}	25 June 1979	list^{[A]}
(16364) 1979 MA_{5}	25 June 1979	list^{[A]}
(16365) 1979 MK_{5}	25 June 1979	list^{[A]}
(16366) 1979 ME_{7}	25 June 1979	list^{[A]}
(16369) 1981 DJ	28 February 1981	list
(16370) 1981 DA_{2}	28 February 1981	list
(16371) 1981 DQ_{3}	28 February 1981	list
(16373) 1981 ES_{5}	7 March 1981	list
(16374) 1981 EA_{10}	1 March 1981	list
(16375) 1981 EM_{10}	1 March 1981	list
(16376) 1981 EX_{10}	1 March 1981	list
(16377) 1981 EY_{11}	7 March 1981	list
(16378) 1981 ET_{17}	2 March 1981	list
(16379) 1981 EJ_{18}	2 March 1981	list
(16380) 1981 EJ_{20}	2 March 1981	list
(16381) 1981 EG_{25}	2 March 1981	list
(16382) 1981 ER_{27}	2 March 1981	list
(16383) 1981 EV_{30}	2 March 1981	list
(16384) 1981 ES_{31}	2 March 1981	list
(16385) 1981 EQ_{32}	7 March 1981	list
(16386) 1981 ET_{34}	2 March 1981	list
(16387) 1981 EB_{37}	11 March 1981	list
(16388) 1981 EA_{39}	2 March 1981	list
(16389) 1981 EC_{39}	2 March 1981	list
(16390) 1981 EG_{39}	2 March 1981	list
(16391) 1981 EM_{40}	2 March 1981	list
(16392) 1981 EP_{42}	2 March 1981	list
(16394) 1981 QD_{4}	30 August 1981	list
(16396) 1981 UN_{22}	24 October 1981	list
(16428) 1988 RD_{12}	14 September 1988	list
(16429) 1988 SB_{2}	16 September 1988	list
(16454) 1989 TT_{2}	3 October 1989	list
(17352) 1975 SG_{1}	30 September 1975	list
(17363) 1978 VF_{3}	7 November 1978	list^{[A]}
(17364) 1978 VR_{10}	7 November 1978	list^{[A]}
(17365) 1978 VF_{11}	7 November 1978	list^{[A]}
(17366) 1979 OV_{4}	24 July 1979	list
(17367) 1979 OU_{11}	26 July 1979	list
(17371) 1981 DT	28 February 1981	list
(17372) 1981 DV	28 February 1981	list
(17373) 1981 EQ_{3}	2 March 1981	list
(17374) 1981 EF_{4}	2 March 1981	list
(17375) 1981 EJ_{4}	2 March 1981	list
(17376) 1981 EQ_{4}	2 March 1981	list
(17377) 1981 EF_{5}	2 March 1981	list
(17378) 1981 EM_{5}	2 March 1981	list
(17379) 1981 ED_{8}	1 March 1981	list
(17380) 1981 EB_{10}	1 March 1981	list
(17381) 1981 EC_{11}	1 March 1981	list
(17382) 1981 EH_{11}	1 March 1981	list
(17383) 1981 EE_{12}	1 March 1981	list
(17384) 1981 EM_{12}	1 March 1981	list
(17385) 1981 EU_{13}	1 March 1981	list
(17386) 1981 EA_{23}	2 March 1981	list
(17387) 1981 EV_{23}	3 March 1981	list
(17388) 1981 EZ_{24}	2 March 1981	list
(17389) 1981 EN_{30}	2 March 1981	list
(17390) 1981 EZ_{37}	1 March 1981	list
(17391) 1981 EK_{39}	2 March 1981	list
(17392) 1981 EY_{40}	2 March 1981	list
(17393) 1981 EA_{41}	2 March 1981	list
(17394) 1981 ER_{42}	2 March 1981	list
(17395) 1981 EA_{44}	6 March 1981	list
(17396) 1981 EK_{45}	1 March 1981	list
(17397) 1981 EF_{48}	6 March 1981	list
(17414) 1988 RN_{10}	14 September 1988	list
(17415) 1988 RO_{10}	14 September 1988	list
(17416) 1988 RR_{10}	14 September 1988	list
(17417) 1988 RY_{10}	14 September 1988	list
(17418) 1988 RT_{12}	14 September 1988	list
(17419) 1988 RH_{13}	14 September 1988	list
(17420) 1988 RL_{13}	14 September 1988	list
(17421) 1988 SW_{1}	16 September 1988	list
(17422) 1988 SE_{2}	16 September 1988	list
(17423) 1988 SK_{2}	16 September 1988	list
(17424) 1988 SP_{2}	16 September 1988	list
(17442) 1989 UO_{5}	30 October 1989	list
(17443) 1989 UU_{5}	30 October 1989	list
(18296) 1978 VW_{2}	7 November 1978	list^{[A]}
(18297) 1978 VG_{4}	7 November 1978	list^{[A]}
(18298) 1979 MZ_{4}	25 June 1979	list^{[A]}
(18299) 1979 MT_{8}	25 June 1979	list^{[A]}
(18304) 1981 DH_{1}	28 February 1981	list
(18305) 1981 DL_{1}	28 February 1981	list
(18306) 1981 EF_{9}	1 March 1981	list
(18307) 1981 ER_{10}	1 March 1981	list
(18308) 1981 EZ_{11}	7 March 1981	list
(18309) 1981 EV_{13}	1 March 1981	list
(18310) 1981 EJ_{16}	1 March 1981	list
(18311) 1981 EV_{16}	6 March 1981	list
(18312) 1981 EC_{19}	2 March 1981	list
(18313) 1981 EB_{23}	2 March 1981	list
(18314) 1981 EX_{27}	2 March 1981	list
(18315) 1981 ED_{37}	11 March 1981	list
(18316) 1981 EJ_{38}	1 March 1981	list
(18317) 1981 EM_{41}	2 March 1981	list
(18318) 1981 ET_{43}	6 March 1981	list
(18320) 1981 UJ_{28}	24 October 1981	list
(18337) 1988 RB_{11}	14 September 1988	list
(18344) 1989 TN_{11}	2 October 1989	list
(19086) 1978 VB_{3}	7 November 1978	list^{[A]}
(19087) 1978 VT_{4}	7 November 1978	list^{[A]}
(19088) 1978 VW_{4}	7 November 1978	list^{[A]}
(19089) 1978 VZ_{6}	7 November 1978	list^{[A]}
(19090) 1978 VM_{9}	7 November 1978	list^{[A]}
(19092) 1979 MF_{2}	25 June 1979	list^{[A]}
(19093) 1979 MM_{3}	25 June 1979	list^{[A]}
(19094) 1979 MR_{6}	25 June 1979	list^{[A]}
(19095) 1979 MA_{8}	25 June 1979	list^{[A]}
(19097) 1981 EY_{2}	2 March 1981	list
(19098) 1981 EM_{3}	2 March 1981	list
(19099) 1981 EC_{4}	2 March 1981	list
(19100) 1981 EH_{5}	2 March 1981	list
(19101) 1981 EV_{6}	6 March 1981	list
(19102) 1981 EH_{8}	1 March 1981	list
(19103) 1981 ER_{11}	7 March 1981	list
(19104) 1981 EY_{13}	1 March 1981	list
(19105) 1981 EB_{15}	1 March 1981	list
(19106) 1981 EV_{15}	1 March 1981	list
(19107) 1981 EU_{19}	2 March 1981	list
(19108) 1981 EV_{21}	2 March 1981	list
(19109) 1981 EZ_{23}	7 March 1981	list
(19110) 1981 EF_{29}	1 March 1981	list
(19111) 1981 EM_{29}	1 March 1981	list
(19112) 1981 EN_{31}	2 March 1981	list
(19113) 1981 EB_{33}	1 March 1981	list
(19114) 1981 EP_{37}	1 March 1981	list
(19115) 1981 EM_{39}	2 March 1981	list
(19116) 1981 EZ_{40}	2 March 1981	list
(19117) 1981 EL_{41}	2 March 1981	list
(19921) 1978 VV_{3}	7 November 1978	list^{[A]}
(19922) 1978 VV_{4}	7 November 1978	list^{[A]}
(19923) 1978 VA_{8}	6 November 1978	list^{[A]}
(19924) 1979 MQ_{6}	25 June 1979	list^{[A]}
(19928) 1981 DB_{3}	28 February 1981	list
(19929) 1981 DL_{3}	28 February 1981	list
(19930) 1981 EV_{2}	2 March 1981	list
(19931) 1981 EF_{3}	2 March 1981	list
(19932) 1981 EU_{4}	2 March 1981	list
(19933) 1981 EW_{5}	7 March 1981	list
(19934) 1981 EG_{11}	1 March 1981	list
(19935) 1981 EG_{12}	1 March 1981	list
(19936) 1981 EZ_{12}	1 March 1981	list
(19937) 1981 EF_{15}	1 March 1981	list
(19938) 1981 EN_{15}	1 March 1981	list
(19939) 1981 EG_{16}	1 March 1981	list
(19940) 1981 EK_{20}	2 March 1981	list
(19941) 1981 ES_{24}	2 March 1981	list
(19942) 1981 EV_{24}	2 March 1981	list
(19943) 1981 EB_{31}	2 March 1981	list
(19944) 1981 EF_{31}	2 March 1981	list
(19945) 1981 ET_{31}	2 March 1981	list
(19946) 1981 EB_{35}	2 March 1981	list
(19947) 1981 EE_{39}	2 March 1981	list
(19948) 1981 EP_{40}	2 March 1981	list
(19949) 1981 EM_{46}	2 March 1981	list
(19950) 1981 EP_{47}	2 March 1981	list
(19973) 1988 RZ_{10}	14 September 1988	list
(20966) 1978 VH_{5}	7 November 1978	list^{[A]}
(20967) 1978 VF_{6}	7 November 1978	list^{[A]}
(20968) 1978 VM_{8}	7 November 1978	list^{[A]}
(20970) 1981 DD_{1}	28 February 1981	list
(20971) 1981 DR_{1}	28 February 1981	list
(20972) 1981 DX_{2}	28 February 1981	list
(20973) 1981 EL_{2}	2 March 1981	list
(20974) 1981 EO_{2}	2 March 1981	list
(20975) 1981 ER_{4}	2 March 1981	list
(20976) 1981 EA_{6}	7 March 1981	list
(20977) 1981 EN_{7}	1 March 1981	list
(20978) 1981 EW_{10}	1 March 1981	list
(20979) 1981 EO_{13}	1 March 1981	list
(20980) 1981 ED_{16}	1 March 1981	list
(20981) 1981 EZ_{16}	6 March 1981	list
(20982) 1981 EL_{17}	1 March 1981	list
(20983) 1981 EN_{20}	2 March 1981	list
(20984) 1981 EH_{33}	1 March 1981	list
(20985) 1981 EA_{35}	2 March 1981	list
(20986) 1981 EL_{37}	1 March 1981	list
(20987) 1981 EU_{38}	1 March 1981	list
(20988) 1981 EC_{43}	2 March 1981	list
(20989) 1981 EZ_{45}	2 March 1981	list
(21013) 1988 RW_{10}	14 September 1988	list
(21030) 1989 TZ_{11}	2 October 1989	list
(22255) 1978 VX_{4}	7 November 1978	list^{[A]}
(22256) 1978 VP_{9}	7 November 1978	list^{[A]}
(22257) 1978 VJ_{10}	7 November 1978	list^{[A]}
(22258) 1979 MB_{3}	25 June 1979	list^{[A]}
(22259) 1979 MD_{5}	25 June 1979	list^{[A]}
(22264) 1981 EX_{8}	1 March 1981	list
(22265) 1981 EE_{11}	1 March 1981	list
(22266) 1981 EQ_{11}	7 March 1981	list
(22267) 1981 ET_{23}	3 March 1981	list
(22268) 1981 EJ_{26}	2 March 1981	list
(22269) 1981 EK_{27}	2 March 1981	list
(22270) 1981 EQ_{30}	2 March 1981	list
(22271) 1981 EZ_{32}	1 March 1981	list
(22272) 1981 EY_{39}	2 March 1981	list
(22287) 1988 RL_{12}	14 September 1988	list
(23413) 1978 VQ_{9}	7 November 1978	list^{[A]}
(23414) 1979 MP_{1}	25 June 1979	list^{[A]}
(23415) 1979 MQ_{3}	25 June 1979	list^{[A]}
(23416) 1979 MU_{4}	25 June 1979	list^{[A]}
(23417) 1979 MU_{6}	25 June 1979	list^{[A]}
(23420) 1981 DO	28 February 1981	list
(23421) 1981 DR	28 February 1981	list
(23422) 1981 DF_{1}	28 February 1981	list
(23423) 1981 EA_{3}	2 March 1981	list

Name	Discovery Date	Listing
(23424) 1981 EU_{9}	1 March 1981	list
(23425) 1981 EL_{12}	1 March 1981	list
(23426) 1981 EB_{16}	1 March 1981	list
(23427) 1981 EF_{16}	1 March 1981	list
(23428) 1981 EL_{18}	2 March 1981	list
(23429) 1981 EO_{35}	2 March 1981	list
(23430) 1981 EO_{38}	1 March 1981	list
(23431) 1981 EA_{45}	7 March 1981	list
(23432) 1981 EF_{47}	2 March 1981	list
(23433) 1981 UU_{22}	24 October 1981	list
(23434) 1981 UB_{23}	24 October 1981	list
(23435) 1981 UZ_{24}	25 October 1981	list
(23463) 1989 TX_{11}	2 October 1989	list
(24613) 1978 VL_{3}	7 November 1978	list^{[A]}
(24614) 1978 VY_{3}	7 November 1978	list^{[A]}
(24615) 1978 VO_{5}	7 November 1978	list^{[A]}
(24616) 1978 VC_{9}	7 November 1978	list^{[A]}
(24617) 1978 WU	29 November 1978	list^{[E]}
(24620) 1979 MO_{2}	25 June 1979	list^{[A]}
(24621) 1979 MS_{4}	25 June 1979	list^{[A]}
(24622) 1979 MU_{5}	25 June 1979	list^{[A]}
(24623) 1979 MD_{8}	25 June 1979	list^{[A]}
(24627) 1981 DT_{3}	28 February 1981	list
(24628) 1981 EG_{3}	2 March 1981	list
(24629) 1981 EA_{4}	2 March 1981	list
(24630) 1981 EZ_{9}	1 March 1981	list
(24631) 1981 EB_{21}	2 March 1981	list
(24632) 1981 ER_{24}	2 March 1981	list
(24633) 1981 EP_{25}	2 March 1981	list
(24634) 1981 EX_{29}	2 March 1981	list
(24635) 1981 EN_{42}	2 March 1981	list
(24638) 1981 UC_{23}	24 October 1981	list
(24678) 1989 TR_{11}	2 October 1989	list
(26076) 1979 MM_{1}	25 June 1979	list^{[A]}
(26077) 1979 ML_{6}	25 June 1979	list^{[A]}
(26078) 1979 MP_{6}	25 June 1979	list^{[A]}
(26079) 1979 MW_{6}	25 June 1979	list^{[A]}
(26082) 1981 EB_{11}	1 March 1981	list
(26083) 1981 EJ_{11}	1 March 1981	list
(26084) 1981 EK_{17}	1 March 1981	list
(26085) 1981 ED_{18}	2 March 1981	list
(26086) 1981 UE_{23}	24 October 1981	list
(26096) 1988 SD_{3}	16 September 1988	list
(26796) 1978 VO_{6}	7 November 1978	list^{[A]}
(26797) 1978 VS_{8}	7 November 1978	list^{[A]}
(26801) 1981 EC_{14}	1 March 1981	list
(26802) 1981 EJ_{24}	7 March 1981	list
(26803) 1981 ES_{26}	2 March 1981	list
(26804) 1981 EZ_{29}	2 March 1981	list
(26805) 1981 EZ_{30}	2 March 1981	list
(26822) 1988 RG_{13}	14 September 1988	list
(26823) 1988 SS_{2}	16 September 1988	list
(26827) 1989 UW_{5}	30 October 1989	list
(27663) 1978 VP_{4}	7 November 1978	list^{[A]}
(27664) 1978 VX_{5}	6 November 1978	list^{[A]}
(27665) 1978 VZ_{5}	7 November 1978	list^{[A]}
(27666) 1978 VU_{6}	7 November 1978	list^{[A]}
(27668) 1979 ME_{4}	25 June 1979	list^{[A]}
(27669) 1979 MQ_{4}	25 June 1979	list^{[A]}
(27670) 1979 MY_{6}	25 June 1979	list^{[A]}
(27671) 1979 MG_{7}	25 June 1979	list^{[A]}
(27673) 1980 UN_{1}	31 October 1980	list
(27674) 1980 UR_{1}	31 October 1980	list
(27676) 1981 DH_{3}	28 February 1981	list
(27677) 1981 EV_{3}	2 March 1981	list
(27678) 1981 EX_{3}	2 March 1981	list
(27679) 1981 EA_{5}	2 March 1981	list
(27680) 1981 EQ_{8}	1 March 1981	list
(27681) 1981 EG_{10}	1 March 1981	list
(27682) 1981 EC_{17}	6 March 1981	list
(27683) 1981 ED_{20}	2 March 1981	list
(27684) 1981 EX_{20}	2 March 1981	list
(27685) 1981 EE_{21}	2 March 1981	list
(27686) 1981 ES_{21}	2 March 1981	list
(27687) 1981 EM_{23}	3 March 1981	list
(27688) 1981 EX_{23}	7 March 1981	list
(27689) 1981 EU_{25}	2 March 1981	list
(27690) 1981 EL_{27}	2 March 1981	list
(27691) 1981 EA_{29}	1 March 1981	list
(27692) 1981 EC_{34}	1 March 1981	list
(27693) 1981 EG_{34}	1 March 1981	list
(27694) 1981 EX_{34}	2 March 1981	list
(27695) 1981 EW_{36}	7 March 1981	list
(27696) 1981 EG_{40}	2 March 1981	list
(27697) 1981 EM_{45}	1 March 1981	list
(27698) 1981 EN_{47}	2 March 1981	list
(29077) 1975 SR	30 September 1975	list
(29078) 1975 SX_{1}	30 September 1975	list
(29082) 1978 VG_{9}	7 November 1978	list^{[A]}
(29083) 1979 MG_{3}	25 June 1979	list^{[A]}
(29084) 1979 MD_{7}	25 June 1979	list^{[A]}
(29087) 1980 VW_{2}	1 November 1980	list
(29088) 1981 DR_{2}	28 February 1981	list
(29089) 1981 DD_{3}	28 February 1981	list
(29090) 1981 EY_{3}	2 March 1981	list
(29091) 1981 EF_{8}	1 March 1981	list
(29092) 1981 EL_{10}	1 March 1981	list
(29093) 1981 EQ_{10}	1 March 1981	list
(29094) 1981 ED_{11}	1 March 1981	list
(29095) 1981 EK_{11}	7 March 1981	list
(29096) 1981 EW_{11}	7 March 1981	list
(29097) 1981 EC_{12}	1 March 1981	list
(29098) 1981 EN_{16}	6 March 1981	list
(29099) 1981 EQ_{16}	6 March 1981	list
(29100) 1981 EE_{18}	2 March 1981	list
(29101) 1981 EZ_{20}	2 March 1981	list
(29102) 1981 EA_{22}	2 March 1981	list
(29103) 1981 EC_{22}	2 March 1981	list
(29104) 1981 EO_{22}	2 March 1981	list
(29105) 1981 EY_{22}	2 March 1981	list
(29106) 1981 EL_{25}	2 March 1981	list
(29107) 1981 EO_{25}	2 March 1981	list
(29108) 1981 EG_{26}	2 March 1981	list
(29109) 1981 EO_{28}	6 March 1981	list
(29110) 1981 ET_{29}	1 March 1981	list
(29111) 1981 EC_{33}	1 March 1981	list
(29112) 1981 EZ_{33}	1 March 1981	list
(29113) 1981 EA_{34}	1 March 1981	list
(29114) 1981 EB_{34}	1 March 1981	list
(29115) 1981 EW_{38}	1 March 1981	list
(29116) 1981 ED_{40}	2 March 1981	list
(29117) 1981 EK_{40}	2 March 1981	list
(29118) 1981 EQ_{43}	3 March 1981	list
(29119) 1981 EW_{45}	1 March 1981	list
(29120) 1981 EY_{45}	1 March 1981	list
(29151) 1988 RE_{11}	14 September 1988	list
(29152) 1988 RA_{13}	14 September 1988	list
(29153) 1988 SY_{2}	16 September 1988	list
(30721) 1975 ST_{1}	30 September 1975	list
(30726) 1978 VK_{7}	7 November 1978	list^{[A]}
(30727) 1979 MC_{9}	25 June 1979	list^{[A]}
(30730) 1981 DL	28 February 1981	list
(30731) 1981 EK_{2}	2 March 1981	list
(30732) 1981 EQ_{2}	2 March 1981	list
(30733) 1981 EJ_{3}	2 March 1981	list
(30734) 1981 ES_{3}	2 March 1981	list
(30735) 1981 EF_{7}	6 March 1981	list
(30736) 1981 EU_{7}	1 March 1981	list
(30737) 1981 ER_{9}	1 March 1981	list
(30738) 1981 EO_{11}	7 March 1981	list
(30739) 1981 EN_{14}	1 March 1981	list
(30740) 1981 ET_{14}	1 March 1981	list
(30741) 1981 EQ_{15}	1 March 1981	list
(30742) 1981 EG_{17}	1 March 1981	list
(30743) 1981 EQ_{17}	1 March 1981	list
(30744) 1981 EN_{18}	2 March 1981	list
(30745) 1981 EB_{22}	2 March 1981	list
(30746) 1981 EG_{24}	7 March 1981	list
(30747) 1981 EM_{25}	2 March 1981	list
(30748) 1981 ES_{25}	2 March 1981	list
(30749) 1981 ER_{26}	2 March 1981	list
(30750) 1981 EY_{28}	1 March 1981	list
(30751) 1981 EL_{29}	1 March 1981	list
(30752) 1981 EQ_{33}	1 March 1981	list
(30753) 1981 EL_{38}	1 March 1981	list
(30754) 1981 EB_{39}	2 March 1981	list
(30755) 1981 EO_{39}	2 March 1981	list
(30756) 1981 ET_{39}	2 March 1981	list
(30757) 1981 EB_{40}	2 March 1981	list
(30758) 1981 EN_{41}	2 March 1981	list
(30759) 1981 EV_{41}	2 March 1981	list
(30760) 1981 EY_{41}	2 March 1981	list
(30761) 1981 EF_{42}	2 March 1981	list
(30762) 1981 ES_{42}	2 March 1981	list
(30763) 1981 EJ_{47}	2 March 1981	list
(30764) 1981 EK_{47}	2 March 1981	list
(30765) 1981 EJ_{48}	6 March 1981	list
(30766) 1981 UX_{22}	24 October 1981	list
(30790) 1988 RT_{11}	14 September 1988	list
(30791) 1988 RY_{11}	14 September 1988	list
(30792) 1988 RP_{12}	14 September 1988	list
(30793) 1988 SJ_{3}	16 September 1988	list
(30806) 1989 UP_{5}	30 October 1989	list
(30807) 1989 UQ_{5}	30 October 1989	list
(32732) 1975 SH_{1}	30 September 1975	list
(32739) 1978 VA_{5}	7 November 1978	list^{[A]}
(32740) 1978 VB_{7}	7 November 1978	list^{[A]}
(32741) 1978 VX_{8}	7 November 1978	list^{[A]}
(32742) 1978 VB_{10}	7 November 1978	list^{[A]}
(32743) 1979 MR_{1}	25 June 1979	list^{[A]}
(32744) 1979 MR_{5}	25 June 1979	list^{[A]}
(32745) 1981 DO_{1}	28 February 1981	list
(32746) 1981 EW_{2}	2 March 1981	list
(32747) 1981 EY_{5}	7 March 1981	list
(32748) 1981 EY_{7}	1 March 1981	list
(32749) 1981 EA_{9}	1 March 1981	list
(32750) 1981 EG_{9}	1 March 1981	list
(32751) 1981 EB_{12}	1 March 1981	list
(32752) 1981 EZ_{13}	1 March 1981	list
(32753) 1981 EB_{14}	1 March 1981	list
(32754) 1981 EK_{15}	1 March 1981	list
(32755) 1981 EP_{15}	1 March 1981	list
(32756) 1981 ER_{15}	1 March 1981	list
(32757) 1981 EP_{18}	2 March 1981	list
(32758) 1981 ES_{18}	2 March 1981	list
(32759) 1981 EC_{28}	2 March 1981	list
(32760) 1981 ER_{28}	6 March 1981	list
(32761) 1981 ED_{31}	2 March 1981	list
(32762) 1981 ER_{32}	7 March 1981	list
(32763) 1981 EH_{35}	2 March 1981	list
(32764) 1981 EL_{36}	7 March 1981	list
(32765) 1981 EC_{40}	2 March 1981	list
(32782) 1988 RX_{10}	14 September 1988	list
(32783) 1988 RK_{13}	14 September 1988	list
(32791) 1989 TQ_{2}	3 October 1989	list
(32794) 1989 UE_{5}	30 October 1989	list
(34994) 1977 CS_{1}	11 February 1977	list
(34999) 1978 VC_{3}	7 November 1978	list^{[A]}
(35000) 1978 VN_{3}	7 November 1978	list^{[A]}
(35001) 1978 VN_{4}	7 November 1978	list^{[A]}
(35002) 1978 VY_{8}	7 November 1978	list^{[A]}
(35003) 1979 MT_{1}	25 June 1979	list^{[A]}
(35004) 1979 MC_{3}	25 June 1979	list^{[A]}
(35005) 1979 MY_{3}	25 June 1979	list^{[A]}
(35006) 1979 ON_{8}	24 July 1979	list
(35007) 1979 OD_{11}	24 July 1979	list
(35009) 1980 US_{1}	31 October 1980	list
(35010) 1981 DV_{1}	28 February 1981	list
(35011) 1981 DU_{2}	28 February 1981	list
(35012) 1981 EU_{2}	2 March 1981	list
(35013) 1981 EL_{3}	2 March 1981	list
(35014) 1981 EX_{5}	7 March 1981	list
(35015) 1981 EO_{6}	6 March 1981	list
(35016) 1981 EC_{7}	6 March 1981	list
(35017) 1981 EG_{7}	6 March 1981	list
(35018) 1981 EX_{9}	1 March 1981	list
(35019) 1981 EH_{10}	1 March 1981	list
(35020) 1981 EJ_{12}	1 March 1981	list
(35021) 1981 ER_{12}	1 March 1981	list
(35022) 1981 EK_{13}	1 March 1981	list
(35023) 1981 EO_{14}	1 March 1981	list
(35024) 1981 EV_{14}	1 March 1981	list
(35025) 1981 EA_{15}	1 March 1981	list
(35026) 1981 EM_{16}	6 March 1981	list
(35027) 1981 ET_{18}	2 March 1981	list
(35028) 1981 ET_{21}	2 March 1981	list
(35029) 1981 EM_{22}	2 March 1981	list
(35030) 1981 EW_{22}	2 March 1981	list
(35031) 1981 EE_{23}	3 March 1981	list
(35032) 1981 EL_{26}	2 March 1981	list
(35033) 1981 EA_{27}	2 March 1981	list
(35034) 1981 EF_{27}	2 March 1981	list
(35035) 1981 ER_{29}	1 March 1981	list
(35036) 1981 EC_{30}	2 March 1981	list
(35037) 1981 EC_{32}	6 March 1981	list
(35038) 1981 EL_{32}	7 March 1981	list
(35039) 1981 EE_{33}	1 March 1981	list
(35040) 1981 EV_{33}	1 March 1981	list
(35041) 1981 ER_{34}	2 March 1981	list
(35042) 1981 EO_{36}	7 March 1981	list
(35043) 1981 EH_{38}	1 March 1981	list
(35044) 1981 ET_{40}	2 March 1981	list
(35045) 1981 EB_{42}	2 March 1981	list
(35046) 1981 EL_{43}	3 March 1981	list
(35047) 1981 EF_{44}	6 March 1981	list
(35048) 1981 EF_{45}	15 March 1981	list
(35049) 1981 EE_{46}	2 March 1981	list
(35050) 1981 EA_{47}	2 March 1981	list
(35051) 1981 ED_{47}	2 March 1981	list
(35064) 1988 RE_{10}	14 September 1988	list
(35065) 1988 SU_{1}	16 September 1988	list
(35066) 1988 SV_{1}	16 September 1988	list
(37528) 1975 SX	30 September 1975	list
(37531) 1978 VF_{7}	7 November 1978	list^{[A]}
(37532) 1978 VL_{8}	6 November 1978	list^{[A]}
(37533) 1979 MX_{8}	25 June 1979	list^{[A]}
(37535) 1981 DP	28 February 1981	list
(37536) 1981 EM_{2}	2 March 1981	list
(37537) 1981 EP_{2}	2 March 1981	list
(37538) 1981 EK_{3}	2 March 1981	list
(37539) 1981 EY_{4}	2 March 1981	list
(37540) 1981 ES_{7}	1 March 1981	list
(37541) 1981 EW_{7}	1 March 1981	list
(37542) 1981 EJ_{8}	1 March 1981	list
(37543) 1981 ER_{8}	1 March 1981	list
(37544) 1981 EY_{16}	6 March 1981	list
(37545) 1981 EA_{18}	2 March 1981	list
(37546) 1981 ET_{20}	2 March 1981	list
(37547) 1981 EH_{22}	2 March 1981	list
(37548) 1981 EO_{30}	2 March 1981	list
(37549) 1981 ET_{30}	2 March 1981	list
(37550) 1981 EE_{31}	2 March 1981	list
(37551) 1981 EY_{34}	2 March 1981	list
(37552) 1981 EU_{39}	2 March 1981	list
(37553) 1981 EN_{43}	3 March 1981	list
(37554) 1981 ET_{44}	7 March 1981	list
(37555) 1981 EG_{47}	2 March 1981	list
(37563) 1988 SG_{2}	16 September 1988	list
(37572) 1989 UC_{5}	30 October 1989	list
(39472) 1978 VJ_{3}	7 November 1978	list^{[A]}
(39473) 1978 VW_{3}	6 November 1978	list^{[A]}
(39474) 1978 VC_{7}	7 November 1978	list^{[A]}
(39475) 1978 VE_{8}	7 November 1978	list^{[A]}
(39476) 1979 MA_{2}	25 June 1979	list^{[A]}
(39477) 1979 MF_{5}	25 June 1979	list^{[A]}
(39479) 1980 UQ_{1}	31 October 1980	list
(39480) 1981 DU	28 February 1981	list
(39481) 1981 DP_{1}	28 February 1981	list
(39482) 1981 DD_{2}	28 February 1981	list
(39483) 1981 DW_{2}	28 February 1981	list
(39484) 1981 DP_{3}	28 February 1981	list
(39485) 1981 EO_{3}	2 March 1981	list
(39486) 1981 ET_{5}	7 March 1981	list
(39487) 1981 EC_{6}	7 March 1981	list
(39488) 1981 EM_{6}	6 March 1981	list
(39489) 1981 EU_{6}	6 March 1981	list
(39490) 1981 EQ_{7}	1 March 1981	list
(39491) 1981 EW_{8}	1 March 1981	list
(39492) 1981 EO_{10}	1 March 1981	list
(39493) 1981 EV_{10}	1 March 1981	list
(39494) 1981 EM_{11}	7 March 1981	list
(39495) 1981 EP_{11}	7 March 1981	list
(39496) 1981 EM_{14}	1 March 1981	list
(39497) 1981 EB_{18}	2 March 1981	list
(39498) 1981 EH_{25}	2 March 1981	list
(39499) 1981 EJ_{29}	1 March 1981	list
(39500) 1981 EK_{30}	2 March 1981	list
(39502) 1981 EE_{36}	6 March 1981	list
(39503) 1981 EC_{38}	1 March 1981	list
(39504) 1981 EZ_{39}	2 March 1981	list
(39505) 1981 EX_{40}	2 March 1981	list
(39506) 1981 EO_{44}	7 March 1981	list
(39507) 1981 EC_{45}	7 March 1981	list
(39508) 1981 EW_{46}	2 March 1981	list
(39522) 1988 RA_{12}	14 September 1988	list
(39525) 1989 TR_{2}	3 October 1989	list
(42465) 1978 VH_{4}	7 November 1978	list^{[A]}
(42466) 1978 VP_{6}	6 November 1978	list^{[A]}
(42467) 1978 VX_{6}	7 November 1978	list^{[A]}
(42469) 1981 DN_{3}	28 February 1981	list
(42470) 1981 EO_{16}	6 March 1981	list
(42471) 1981 ES_{16}	6 March 1981	list
(42472) 1981 EN_{25}	2 March 1981	list
(42473) 1981 ED_{26}	2 March 1981	list
(42474) 1981 EJ_{27}	2 March 1981	list
(42475) 1981 EW_{28}	1 March 1981	list
(42476) 1981 EP_{36}	7 March 1981	list
(43723) 1975 SZ_{1}	30 September 1975	list
(43727) 1979 MQ_{2}	25 June 1979	list^{[A]}
(43728) 1979 MA_{3}	25 June 1979	list^{[A]}
(43729) 1979 MS_{3}	25 June 1979	list^{[A]}
(43730) 1979 MK_{4}	25 June 1979	list^{[A]}
(43731) 1979 ML_{5}	25 June 1979	list^{[A]}
(43732) 1979 MO_{7}	25 June 1979	list^{[A]}
(43733) 1979 MV_{7}	25 June 1979	list^{[A]}
(43734) 1979 MY_{7}	25 June 1979	list^{[A]}
(43735) 1981 DQ_{1}	28 February 1981	list
(43736) 1981 DL_{2}	28 February 1981	list
(43737) 1981 EU_{3}	2 March 1981	list
(43738) 1981 ED_{6}	7 March 1981	list
(43739) 1981 EP_{7}	1 March 1981	list
(43740) 1981 EM_{9}	1 March 1981	list
(43741) 1981 ES_{10}	1 March 1981	list
(43742) 1981 EX_{12}	1 March 1981	list
(43743) 1981 EK_{16}	1 March 1981	list
(43744) 1981 EX_{17}	2 March 1981	list
(43745) 1981 EN_{22}	2 March 1981	list
(43746) 1981 EH_{31}	2 March 1981	list
(43747) 1981 EX_{31}	2 March 1981	list
(43748) 1981 ET_{37}	1 March 1981	list
(43749) 1981 EG_{46}	2 March 1981	list
(46515) 1978 VW_{5}	7 November 1978	list^{[A]}
(46516) 1978 VQ_{6}	6 November 1978	list^{[A]}
(46517) 1978 VM_{7}	7 November 1978	list^{[A]}
(46518) 1978 VH_{10}	6 November 1978	list^{[A]}
(46519) 1979 ME_{3}	25 June 1979	list^{[A]}
(46520) 1979 MJ_{3}	25 June 1979	list^{[A]}
(46521) 1979 MM_{7}	25 June 1979	list^{[A]}
(46522) 1979 MS_{7}	25 June 1979	list^{[A]}
(46523) 1979 OH_{10}	24 July 1979	list
(46525) 1980 UG_{1}	31 October 1980	list
(46526) 1981 EN_{5}	2 March 1981	list
(46527) 1981 EE_{7}	6 March 1981	list
(46528) 1981 EB_{8}	1 March 1981	list
(46529) 1981 ED_{9}	1 March 1981	list
(46530) 1981 EE_{10}	1 March 1981	list
(46531) 1981 EV_{11}	7 March 1981	list
(46532) 1981 EN_{13}	1 March 1981	list
(46533) 1981 EO_{23}	3 March 1981	list
(46534) 1981 EU_{27}	2 March 1981	list
(46535) 1981 EB_{36}	3 March 1981	list
(46536) 1981 EJ_{40}	2 March 1981	list
(46537) 1981 EV_{45}	1 March 1981	list
(46538) 1981 UC_{26}	25 October 1981	list
(46545) 1988 RY_{12}	14 September 1988	list
(48383) 1978 VH_{7}	6 November 1978	list^{[A]}
(48384) 1978 VQ_{8}	7 November 1978	list^{[A]}
(48385) 1978 VH_{9}	7 November 1978	list^{[A]}
(48386) 1979 MQ_{1}	25 June 1979	list^{[A]}
(48387) 1979 MM_{2}	25 June 1979	list^{[A]}
(48388) 1979 MZ_{5}	25 June 1979	list^{[A]}
(48389) 1979 MV_{8}	25 June 1979	list^{[A]}
(48390) 1979 ON_{1}	24 July 1979	list
(48391) 1981 DH_{2}	28 February 1981	list
(48392) 1981 DV_{2}	28 February 1981	list
(48393) 1981 EB_{5}	2 March 1981	list
(48394) 1981 EP_{9}	1 March 1981	list
(48395) 1981 ES_{11}	7 March 1981	list
(48396) 1981 EP_{14}	1 March 1981	list
(48397) 1981 EL_{16}	6 March 1981	list
(48398) 1981 EN_{19}	2 March 1981	list
(48399) 1981 EA_{21}	2 March 1981	list
(48400) 1981 EZ_{21}	2 March 1981	list
(48401) 1981 EW_{27}	2 March 1981	list
(48402) 1981 EH_{28}	2 March 1981	list
(48403) 1981 EP_{41}	2 March 1981	list
(48404) 1981 EQ_{41}	2 March 1981	list
(48405) 1981 EQ_{46}	2 March 1981	list
(48406) 1981 EQ_{47}	2 March 1981	list
(48431) 1989 TV_{5}	2 October 1989	list
(52227) 1975 SM_{1}	30 September 1975	list
(52235) 1979 MW_{2}	25 June 1979	list^{[A]}
(52236) 1979 MF_{7}	25 June 1979	list^{[A]}
(52237) 1979 OW_{2}	24 July 1979	list
(52238) 1979 OM_{9}	24 July 1979	list
(52239) 1979 OV_{10}	24 July 1979	list
(52243) 1981 ED_{3}	2 March 1981	list
(52244) 1981 EE_{4}	2 March 1981	list
(52245) 1981 EP_{4}	2 March 1981	list
52246 Donaldjohanson	2 March 1981	list
(52247) 1981 EP_{10}	1 March 1981	list
(52248) 1981 EE_{15}	1 March 1981	list
(52249) 1981 EK_{21}	2 March 1981	list
(52250) 1981 EE_{32}	6 March 1981	list
(52251) 1981 EF_{32}	6 March 1981	list
(52252) 1981 EJ_{35}	2 March 1981	list
(52253) 1981 EZ_{35}	3 March 1981	list
(52254) 1981 EJ_{36}	7 March 1981	list
(52255) 1981 EM_{37}	1 March 1981	list
(52256) 1981 EM_{38}	1 March 1981	list
(52257) 1981 EJ_{42}	2 March 1981	list
(52258) 1981 EE_{44}	6 March 1981	list
(52259) 1981 EY_{47}	3 March 1981	list
(52273) 1988 RQ_{10}	14 September 1988	list
(52274) 1988 RG_{12}	14 September 1988	list
(52275) 1988 RS_{12}	14 September 1988	list
(52276) 1988 RZ_{12}	14 September 1988	list
(52277) 1988 SE_{3}	16 September 1988	list
(52278) 1988 SG_{3}	16 September 1988	list
(55722) 1978 VU_{3}	7 November 1978	list^{[A]}
(55723) 1979 MP_{2}	25 June 1979	list^{[A]}
(55724) 1979 MB_{5}	25 June 1979	list^{[A]}
(55725) 1979 MG_{5}	25 June 1979	list^{[A]}
(55726) 1979 MG_{8}	25 June 1979	list^{[A]}
(55727) 1981 ED_{5}	2 March 1981	list
(55728) 1981 EV_{17}	2 March 1981	list
(55729) 1981 ER_{30}	2 March 1981	list
(55730) 1981 EM_{33}	1 March 1981	list
(55731) 1981 EO_{37}	1 March 1981	list
(58100) 1978 VQ_{7}	7 November 1978	list^{[A]}
(58101) 1979 MV_{4}	25 June 1979	list^{[A]}
(58102) 1979 MW_{4}	25 June 1979	list^{[A]}
(58103) 1979 MQ_{5}	25 June 1979	list^{[A]}
(58104) 1979 ML_{7}	25 June 1979	list^{[A]}
(58105) 1979 MN_{8}	25 June 1979	list^{[A]}
(58106) 1979 MO_{8}	25 June 1979	list^{[A]}
(58107) 1979 OZ_{10}	24 July 1979	list
(58110) 1980 UF_{1}	31 October 1980	list
(58111) 1981 ER_{2}	2 March 1981	list
(58112) 1981 EC_{3}	2 March 1981	list
(58113) 1981 EV_{4}	2 March 1981	list
(58114) 1981 EL_{6}	6 March 1981	list
(58115) 1981 EB_{7}	6 March 1981	list
(58116) 1981 EH_{7}	7 March 1981	list
(58117) 1981 ER_{7}	1 March 1981	list
(58118) 1981 EX_{7}	1 March 1981	list
(58119) 1981 EJ_{9}	1 March 1981	list
(58120) 1981 EU_{11}	7 March 1981	list
(58121) 1981 EA_{13}	1 March 1981	list
(58122) 1981 EW_{19}	2 March 1981	list
(58123) 1981 EE_{22}	2 March 1981	list
(58124) 1981 EK_{29}	1 March 1981	list
(58125) 1981 EO_{31}	2 March 1981	list
(58126) 1981 EJ_{32}	6 March 1981	list
(58127) 1981 EG_{37}	1 March 1981	list
(58128) 1981 EJ_{37}	1 March 1981	list
(58129) 1981 EU_{37}	1 March 1981	list
(58130) 1981 ER_{38}	1 March 1981	list
(58131) 1981 EQ_{39}	2 March 1981	list
(58132) 1981 EW_{39}	2 March 1981	list
(58133) 1981 EN_{40}	2 March 1981	list
(58134) 1981 EW_{40}	2 March 1981	list
(58135) 1981 EK_{42}	2 March 1981	list
(58136) 1981 EV_{42}	2 March 1981	list
(58137) 1981 EJ_{44}	7 March 1981	list
(58138) 1981 ET_{45}	1 March 1981	list
(58139) 1981 EP_{46}	2 March 1981	list
(58141) 1981 UW_{22}	24 October 1981	list
(58153) 1988 RH_{11}	14 September 1988	list
(58154) 1988 RJ_{11}	14 September 1988	list
(65636) 1979 ME_{1}	24 June 1979	list^{[A]}
(65638) 1981 DN_{1}	28 February 1981	list
(65639) 1981 DS_{2}	28 February 1981	list
(65640) 1981 DY_{2}	28 February 1981	list
(65641) 1981 DR_{3}	28 February 1981	list
(65642) 1981 ES_{2}	2 March 1981	list
(65643) 1981 EH_{12}	1 March 1981	list
(65644) 1981 EO_{12}	1 March 1981	list
(65645) 1981 EG_{13}	1 March 1981	list
(65646) 1981 EE_{17}	1 March 1981	list
(65647) 1981 EZ_{28}	1 March 1981	list
(65648) 1981 ES_{32}	7 March 1981	list
(65649) 1981 ES_{33}	1 March 1981	list
(65650) 1981 EP_{35}	2 March 1981	list
(65651) 1981 EV_{35}	2 March 1981	list
(65652) 1981 ED_{41}	2 March 1981	list
(65653) 1981 EP_{44}	7 March 1981	list
(65654) 1981 ES_{47}	2 March 1981	list
(65655) 1981 EV_{47}	2 March 1981	list
(69235) 1978 VS_{3}	7 November 1978	list^{[A]}
(69236) 1978 VF_{5}	6 November 1978	list^{[A]}
(69237) 1978 VR_{6}	7 November 1978	list^{[A]}
(69238) 1978 VZ_{8}	7 November 1978	list^{[A]}
(69240) 1979 MZ_{1}	25 June 1979	list^{[A]}
(69241) 1979 MX_{3}	25 June 1979	list^{[A]}
(69242) 1979 MA_{7}	25 June 1979	list^{[A]}
(69243) 1979 MU_{7}	25 June 1979	list^{[A]}
(69244) 1979 MP_{8}	25 June 1979	list^{[A]}
(69246) 1981 EZ_{4}	2 March 1981	list
(69247) 1981 ED_{10}	1 March 1981	list
(69248) 1981 EA_{19}	2 March 1981	list
(69249) 1981 EH_{27}	2 March 1981	list
(69250) 1981 EK_{32}	7 March 1981	list
(69251) 1981 ER_{33}	1 March 1981	list
(69252) 1981 EC_{35}	2 March 1981	list
(69253) 1981 EX_{35}	2 March 1981	list
(69254) 1981 EW_{37}	1 March 1981	list
(69255) 1981 ER_{40}	2 March 1981	list
(69256) 1981 EF_{46}	2 March 1981	list
(69257) 1981 ER_{47}	2 March 1981	list
(69258) 1981 UJ_{22}	24 October 1981	list
(69268) 1988 SD_{2}	16 September 1988	list
(73641) 1977 UK_{3}	18 October 1977	list
(73645) 1978 VX_{2}	7 November 1978	list^{[A]}
(73646) 1978 VT_{3}	7 November 1978	list^{[A]}
(73647) 1978 VL_{9}	7 November 1978	list^{[A]}
(73648) 1979 ME_{6}	25 June 1979	list^{[A]}
(73649) 1979 MA_{9}	25 June 1979	list^{[A]}
(73650) 1981 DN	28 February 1981	list
(73651) 1981 EJ_{2}	2 March 1981	list
(73652) 1981 EN_{3}	2 March 1981	list
(73653) 1981 EN_{6}	6 March 1981	list
(73654) 1981 ET_{6}	6 March 1981	list
(73655) 1981 EL_{9}	1 March 1981	list
(73656) 1981 EW_{12}	1 March 1981	list
(73657) 1981 EJ_{13}	1 March 1981	list
(73658) 1981 EU_{14}	1 March 1981	list
(73659) 1981 ER_{16}	6 March 1981	list
(73660) 1981 EZ_{19}	2 March 1981	list
(73661) 1981 EW_{25}	2 March 1981	list
(73662) 1981 ES_{27}	2 March 1981	list
(73663) 1981 EL_{31}	2 March 1981	list
(73664) 1981 EE_{34}	1 March 1981	list
(73665) 1981 EX_{42}	2 March 1981	list
(73666) 1981 EH_{45}	1 March 1981	list
(73667) 1981 ER_{45}	1 March 1981	list
(73668) 1981 EG_{48}	6 March 1981	list
(73677) 1988 SA_{3}	16 September 1988	list
(79085) 1975 SE_{1}	30 September 1975	list
(79088) 1978 VB_{4}	7 November 1978	list^{[A]}
(79089) 1978 VX_{10}	7 November 1978	list^{[A]}
(79090) 1979 MZ_{8}	25 June 1979	list^{[A]}
(79091) 1979 OB_{11}	24 July 1979	list
(79092) 1981 DT_{1}	28 February 1981	list
(79093) 1981 EU_{10}	1 March 1981	list
(79094) 1981 ED_{13}	1 March 1981	list
(79095) 1981 EL_{15}	1 March 1981	list
(79096) 1981 EM_{20}	2 March 1981	list
(79097) 1981 EC_{24}	7 March 1981	list
(79098) 1981 EE_{26}	2 March 1981	list
(79099) 1981 EG_{29}	1 March 1981	list
(79100) 1981 EH_{30}	2 March 1981	list
(79101) 1981 EJ_{31}	2 March 1981	list
(79102) 1981 EP_{31}	2 March 1981	list
(79103) 1981 EO_{32}	7 March 1981	list
(79104) 1981 EK_{33}	1 March 1981	list
(79105) 1981 EY_{33}	1 March 1981	list
(79106) 1981 EW_{34}	2 March 1981	list
(79107) 1981 EX_{37}	1 March 1981	list
(79108) 1981 EB_{38}	1 March 1981	list
(79109) 1981 EN_{39}	2 March 1981	list
(79110) 1981 EH_{40}	2 March 1981	list
(79111) 1981 ES_{40}	2 March 1981	list
(79112) 1981 EE_{42}	2 March 1981	list
(79113) 1981 EP_{45}	1 March 1981	list
(79114) 1981 EJ_{46}	2 March 1981	list
(85120) 1975 SP_{1}	30 September 1975	list
(85123) 1978 VC_{8}	7 November 1978	list^{[A]}
(85124) 1978 VF_{8}	7 November 1978	list^{[A]}
(85125) 1978 VU_{8}	7 November 1978	list^{[A]}
(85126) 1978 VO_{10}	7 November 1978	list^{[A]}
(85127) 1978 VJ_{11}	7 November 1978	list^{[A]}
(85129) 1979 MC_{5}	25 June 1979	list^{[A]}
(85130) 1979 MH_{5}	25 June 1979	list^{[A]}
(85131) 1979 MT_{6}	25 June 1979	list^{[A]}
(85132) 1979 MR_{7}	25 June 1979	list^{[A]}
(85133) 1979 MX_{7}	25 June 1979	list^{[A]}
(85134) 1979 MH_{8}	25 June 1979	list^{[A]}
(85137) 1981 DS_{3}	28 February 1981	list
(85138) 1981 ED_{7}	6 March 1981	list
(85139) 1981 EN_{9}	1 March 1981	list
(85140) 1981 ES_{19}	2 March 1981	list
(85141) 1981 EM_{28}	6 March 1981	list
(85142) 1981 EO_{29}	1 March 1981	list
(85143) 1981 EE_{30}	2 March 1981	list
(85144) 1981 EU_{30}	2 March 1981	list
(85145) 1981 ED_{33}	1 March 1981	list
(85146) 1981 EF_{33}	1 March 1981	list
(85147) 1981 EV_{38}	1 March 1981	list
(85148) 1981 EH_{39}	2 March 1981	list
(85149) 1981 EU_{43}	6 March 1981	list
(85150) 1981 EO_{46}	2 March 1981	list
(85160) 1988 RW_{12}	14 September 1988	list
(85161) 1988 SA_{2}	16 September 1988	list
(85162) 1988 SL_{2}	16 September 1988	list
(85163) 1988 SQ_{2}	16 September 1988	list
(90673) 1977 XK_{3}	7 December 1977	list
(90676) 1978 VA_{9}	7 November 1978	list^{[A]}
(90677) 1978 VN_{10}	7 November 1978	list^{[A]}
(90678) 1979 MC_{6}	25 June 1979	list^{[A]}
(90679) 1979 MF_{6}	25 June 1979	list^{[A]}
(90680) 1981 DE_{3}	28 February 1981	list
(90681) 1981 EG_{4}	2 March 1981	list
(90682) 1981 EF_{6}	7 March 1981	list
(90683) 1981 EQ_{6}	6 March 1981	list
(90684) 1981 EY_{6}	6 March 1981	list
(90685) 1981 ET_{9}	1 March 1981	list
(90686) 1981 EF_{19}	2 March 1981	list
(90687) 1981 EY_{23}	7 March 1981	list
(90688) 1981 ED_{30}	2 March 1981	list
(90689) 1981 EA_{31}	2 March 1981	list
(90690) 1981 EK_{31}	2 March 1981	list
(90691) 1981 EA_{32}	6 March 1981	list
(90692) 1981 EJ_{33}	1 March 1981	list
(90693) 1981 EH_{37}	1 March 1981	list
(90694) 1981 EV_{37}	1 March 1981	list
(90695) 1981 ES_{39}	2 March 1981	list
(90696) 1981 EQ_{44}	7 March 1981	list
(90704) 1988 RO_{12}	14 September 1988	list
(96159) 1978 VR_{3}	7 November 1978	list^{[A]}
(96160) 1978 VW_{7}	7 November 1978	list^{[A]}
(96161) 1978 VS_{9}	7 November 1978	list^{[A]}
(96162) 1979 MN_{7}	25 June 1979	list^{[A]}
(96163) 1981 DJ_{1}	28 February 1981	list
(96164) 1981 EH_{6}	2 March 1981	list
(96165) 1981 EL_{14}	1 March 1981	list
(96166) 1981 EW_{15}	1 March 1981	list
(96167) 1981 EG_{20}	2 March 1981	list
(96168) 1981 ER_{23}	3 March 1981	list
(96169) 1981 EW_{23}	7 March 1981	list
(96170) 1981 EE_{29}	1 March 1981	list
(96171) 1981 ET_{32}	8 March 1981	list
(96172) 1981 EN_{34}	2 March 1981	list
(96173) 1981 ED_{36}	6 March 1981	list
(96174) 1981 EF_{38}	1 March 1981	list
(96175) 1981 EY_{43}	6 March 1981	list
(96176) 1981 EZ_{44}	7 March 1981	list
(96180) 1988 SR_{2}	16 September 1988	list
(99951) 1975 SV_{1}	30 September 1975	list
(99952) 1975 SY_{1}	30 September 1975	list
(99957) 1978 VM_{4}	7 November 1978	list^{[A]}
(99958) 1978 VB_{9}	6 November 1978	list^{[A]}
(99959) 1978 VW_{9}	7 November 1978	list^{[A]}
(99960) 1978 VD_{10}	6 November 1978	list^{[A]}
(99961) 1979 MT_{2}	25 June 1979	list^{[A]}
(99962) 1979 MF_{3}	25 June 1979	list^{[A]}
(99963) 1979 MO_{5}	25 June 1979	list^{[A]}
(99964) 1979 MJ_{6}	25 June 1979	list^{[A]}
(99965) 1979 MC_{7}	25 June 1979	list^{[A]}
(99966) 1979 MC_{8}	25 June 1979	list^{[A]}
(99967) 1979 OG_{8}	24 July 1979	list
(99969) 1981 DY_{1}	28 February 1981	list
(99970) 1981 DB_{2}	28 February 1981	list
(99971) 1981 DF_{3}	28 February 1981	list
(99972) 1981 EV_{5}	7 March 1981	list
(99973) 1981 EB_{6}	7 March 1981	list
(99974) 1981 EJ_{6}	2 March 1981	list
(99975) 1981 EP_{6}	6 March 1981	list
(99976) 1981 EZ_{6}	6 March 1981	list
(99977) 1981 ET_{12}	1 March 1981	list
(99978) 1981 ER_{13}	1 March 1981	list
(99979) 1981 EE_{16}	1 March 1981	list
(99980) 1981 ER_{18}	2 March 1981	list
(99981) 1981 EF_{20}	2 March 1981	list
(99982) 1981 EJ_{21}	2 March 1981	list
(99983) 1981 EF_{22}	2 March 1981	list
(99984) 1981 EL_{23}	3 March 1981	list
(99985) 1981 EJ_{25}	2 March 1981	list
(99986) 1981 ET_{28}	1 March 1981	list
(99987) 1981 EC_{31}	2 March 1981	list
(99988) 1981 ET_{33}	1 March 1981	list
(99989) 1981 EL_{35}	2 March 1981	list
(99990) 1981 EM_{35}	2 March 1981	list
(99991) 1981 EY_{37}	1 March 1981	list
(99992) 1981 ER_{41}	2 March 1981	list
(99993) 1981 ED_{42}	2 March 1981	list
(99994) 1981 EN_{44}	7 March 1981	list
(99995) 1981 ED_{45}	7 March 1981	list
(99996) 1981 EJ_{45}	1 March 1981	list
(99997) 1981 EN_{45}	1 March 1981	list
(99998) 1981 ED_{48}	6 March 1981	list
(100010) 1988 RN_{12}	14 September 1988	list
(100017) 1989 TN_{2}	3 October 1989	list
(118163) 1979 MJ_{8}	25 June 1979	list^{[A]}
(118164) 1981 DC_{3}	28 February 1981	list
(118165) 1981 EH_{2}	2 March 1981	list
(118166) 1981 EG_{22}	2 March 1981	list
(118167) 1981 EJ_{30}	2 March 1981	list
(118168) 1981 EQ_{37}	1 March 1981	list
(118169) 1981 EL_{40}	2 March 1981	list
(118170) 1981 EV_{40}	2 March 1981	list
(120439) 1978 VJ_{4}	7 November 1978	list^{[A]}
(120440) 1978 VU_{9}	7 November 1978	list^{[A]}
(120441) 1979 MZ_{7}	25 June 1979	list^{[A]}
(120442) 1981 DW	28 February 1981	list
(120443) 1981 DK_{2}	28 February 1981	list
(120444) 1981 EQ_{13}	1 March 1981	list
(120445) 1981 EU_{16}	6 March 1981	list
(120446) 1981 EF_{21}	2 March 1981	list
(120447) 1981 EP_{32}	7 March 1981	list
(120448) 1981 EO_{43}	3 March 1981	list
(120449) 1981 ED_{44}	6 March 1981	list
(120453) 1988 RE_{12}	14 September 1988	list
(120454) 1988 SJ_{2}	16 September 1988	list
(129438) 1979 MO_{3}	25 June 1979	list^{[A]}
(129440) 1981 DC_{1}	28 February 1981	list
(129441) 1981 DJ_{3}	28 February 1981	list
(129442) 1981 EC_{15}	1 March 1981	list
(129443) 1981 EP_{21}	2 March 1981	list
(129444) 1981 EN_{23}	3 March 1981	list
(129445) 1981 EA_{24}	7 March 1981	list
(129446) 1981 EB_{30}	2 March 1981	list
(129447) 1981 EP_{33}	1 March 1981	list
(134341) 1979 MA	25 June 1979	list^{[A]}
(134342) 1979 MV_{3}	25 June 1979	list^{[A]}
(134343) 1981 EO_{5}	2 March 1981	list
(136565) 1977 XF_{3}	7 December 1977	list
(136566) 1978 VE_{4}	7 November 1978	list^{[A]}
(136567) 1979 OA_{11}	24 July 1979	list
(136569) 1981 EN_{2}	2 March 1981	list
(136570) 1981 EB_{3}	2 March 1981	list
(136571) 1981 EL_{8}	1 March 1981	list
(136572) 1981 EA_{14}	1 March 1981	list
(136573) 1981 EJ_{14}	1 March 1981	list
(136574) 1981 EW_{16}	6 March 1981	list
(136575) 1981 EN_{28}	6 March 1981	list
(136576) 1981 EN_{33}	1 March 1981	list
(136577) 1981 EN_{38}	1 March 1981	list
(136578) 1981 EL_{45}	1 March 1981	list
(136579) 1981 EC_{48}	6 March 1981	list
(145706) 1981 EE_{6}	7 March 1981	list
(145707) 1981 EN_{10}	1 March 1981	list
(145708) 1981 EB_{32}	6 March 1981	list
(150107) 1978 VL_{4}	7 November 1978	list^{[A]}
(150109) 1981 EA_{17}	6 March 1981	list
(150110) 1981 EA_{30}	2 March 1981	list
(152555) 1975 SD_{1}	30 September 1975	list
(152557) 1981 ED_{29}	1 March 1981	list
(155369) 1981 EH_{15}	1 March 1981	list
(160016) 1988 SX_{1}	16 September 1988	list
(161990) 1981 EY_{29}	2 March 1981	list
(161991) 1981 EU_{36}	7 March 1981	list
(161992) 1981 EK_{38}	1 March 1981	list
(161993) 1981 EG_{45}	1 March 1981	list
(161994) 1981 EK_{48}	7 March 1981	list
(164613) 1981 EQ_{38}	1 March 1981	list
(164614) 1981 EJ_{41}	2 March 1981	list
(164615) 1981 RU_{7}	3 September 1981	list
(168314) 1981 EW_{6}	6 March 1981	list
(173118) 1981 EB_{4}	2 March 1981	list
(173119) 1981 EU_{46}	2 March 1981	list
(175659) 1981 EP_{23}	3 March 1981	list
(178284) 1978 WB_{1}	29 November 1978	list^{[E]}
(178285) 1981 EA_{33}	1 March 1981	list
(178286) 1981 EQ_{35}	2 March 1981	list
(178287) 1981 UW_{27}	24 October 1981	list
(178291) 1989 UV_{7}	29 October 1989	list
(181700) 1981 EG_{2}	2 March 1981	list
(181701) 1981 EP_{34}	2 March 1981	list
(185656) 1981 ET_{35}	2 March 1981	list
(192282) 1979 MY_{4}	25 June 1979	list^{[A]}
(192283) 1981 EE_{3}	2 March 1981	list
(192284) 1981 EL_{11}	7 March 1981	list
(192285) 1981 EU_{12}	1 March 1981	list
(192286) 1981 ES_{15}	1 March 1981	list
(192287) 1981 EL_{22}	2 March 1981	list
(192288) 1981 EF_{34}	1 March 1981	list
(192289) 1981 EQ_{45}	1 March 1981	list
(200084) 1981 EH_{29}	1 March 1981	list
(202886) 1979 OZ_{9}	24 July 1979	list
(202887) 1981 EO_{33}	1 March 1981	list
(202888) 1981 EM_{34}	2 March 1981	list
(204963) 1981 EW_{29}	2 March 1981	list
(204964) 1981 EN_{46}	2 March 1981	list
(207943) 1979 MN_{4}	25 June 1979	list^{[A]}
(207944) 1981 EG_{8}	1 March 1981	list
(210455) 1981 EY_{44}	7 March 1981	list
(213000) 1981 ET_{2}	2 March 1981	list
(213001) 1981 EP_{3}	2 March 1981	list
(215099) 1981 EN_{36}	7 March 1981	list
(219019) 1981 EP_{8}	1 March 1981	list
(219020) 1981 EH_{32}	6 March 1981	list
(225278) 1981 DW_{1}	28 February 1981	list
(231667) 1981 EU_{5}	7 March 1981	list
(231668) 1981 EK_{28}	6 March 1981	list
(233969) 1979 OK_{9}	24 July 1979	list
(233970) 1981 ES_{44}	7 March 1981	list
(237361) 1981 EE_{48}	6 March 1981	list
(239798) 1981 EZ_{31}	6 March 1981	list
(241563) 1981 EZ_{5}	7 March 1981	list
(241564) 1981 ET_{11}	7 March 1981	list
(241565) 1981 EU_{45}	1 March 1981	list
(243554) 1981 EL_{30}	2 March 1981	list
(251652) 1981 EX_{45}	1 March 1981	list
(257456) 1981 DA_{3}	28 February 1981	list
(257457) 1981 EG_{33}	1 March 1981	list
(257458) 1981 EV_{36}	7 March 1981	list
(257459) 1981 EA_{37}	7 March 1981	list
(257460) 1981 ES_{37}	1 March 1981	list
(264259) 1979 MC_{4}	25 June 1979	list^{[A]}
(279577) 2011 DY_{22}	24 October 1981	list
(283262) 2011 FU_{147}	2 February 1981	list
(285079) 1981 EQ_{36}	7 March 1981	list
(285080) 1981 EB_{47}	2 March 1981	list
(297235) 1981 EN_{11}	7 March 1981	list
(297236) 1981 EB_{29}	1 March 1981	list
(297237) 1981 EA_{48}	3 March 1981	list
(301843) 1981 DZ_{2}	28 February 1981	list
(312936) 1979 MT_{3}	25 June 1979	list^{[A]}
(343707) 2011 ET_{17}	13 September 1980	list
(350442) 1979 ME_{2}	23 June 1979	list^{[A]}
(356970) 1981 EG_{32}	6 March 1981	list
(363011) 1981 ED_{4}	2 March 1981	list
(401811) 1981 EM_{36}	7 March 1981	list
(404945) 1981 EM_{32}	7 March 1981	list
(437133) 2012 UE_{165}	24 July 1979	list
(495828) 1981 EX_{11}	7 March 1981	list
(499672) 2010 VK_{188}	25 October 1981	list
(515082) 2010 TM_{3}	25 October 1981	list
Co-discovery made with:^{A} E. F. Helin^{B} J. Huchra^{C} T. Lauer^{D} C. S. Shoemaker^{E} C. T. Kowal

== See also ==
- List of minor planet discoverers § S. J. Bus
- Francesca E. DeMeo
