= 2135 Aristaeus =

Near-Earth asteroid

Aristaeus
Discovery
- Discovered by: E. F. Helin and S. J. Bus
- Discovery site: Palomar
- Discovery date: 17 April 1977

Designations
- Pronunciation: /ærɪˈstiːəs/
- Named after: Aristaeus
- Alternative designations: 1977 HA
- Minor planet category: PHA

Orbital characteristics
- Epoch 13 January 2016 (JD 2457400.5)
- Uncertainty parameter 1
- Observation arc: 37.19 yr (13585 days)
- Aphelion: 2.40409 AU (359.647 Gm)
- Perihelion: 0.79485 AU (118.908 Gm)
- Semi-major axis: 1.5995 AU (239.28 Gm)
- Eccentricity: 0.50305
- Orbital period (sidereal): 2.02 yr (738.86 d)
- Mean anomaly: 83.4440°
- Mean motion: 0° 29^{m} 14.046^{s} / day
- Inclination: 23.06145°
- Longitude of ascending node: 191.221°
- Argument of perihelion: 290.8743°
- Earth MOID: 0.00972802 AU (1,455,291 km)

Physical characteristics
- Absolute magnitude (H): 17.94

2135 Aristaeus (1977 HA) is an Apollo asteroid discovered on 17 April 1977, by E. F. Helin and S. J. Bus at Palomar Observatory. It is named for Aristaeus, the son of Apollo and the nymph Cyrene.

2135 Aristaeus is a potentially hazardous asteroid (PHA) because its minimum orbit intersection distance (MOID) is less than 0.05 AU and its diameter is greater than 150 meters. The Earth-MOID is 0.0100 AU (1,500,000 km; 930,000 mi). Its orbit is well-determined for the next several hundred years.

The asteroid made its closest approach to Earth on 1 April 1977, at a nominal distance of 0.03216 AU (4,811,000 km; 2,989,000 mi). It will make its next closest approach on 2 April 2064, at a nominal distance of 0.0546 AU (8,170,000 km; 5,080,000 mi).
