= 2324 Janice =

Dark background asteroid from the outer regions of the asteroid belt

Discovery
- Discovered by: E. F. Helin; S. J. Bus
- Discovery site: Palomar Obs.
- Discovery date: 7 November 1978

Designations
- Named after: Janice Cline (Supporter at Caltech)
- Alternative designations: 1978 VS_{4} · 1929 WH; 1934 VR · 1949 ME; 1961 UP · 1971 OC_{1} 1975 EM_{2} · 1977 RY_{4} A911 MC
- Minor planet category: main-belt · (outer) background · Themis

Orbital characteristics
- Epoch 23 March 2018 (JD 2458200.5)
- Uncertainty parameter 0
- Observation arc: 83.28 yr (30,418 d)
- Aphelion: 3.6382 AU
- Perihelion: 2.5282 AU
- Semi-major axis: 3.0832 AU
- Eccentricity: 0.1800
- Orbital period (sidereal): 5.41 yr (1,977 d)
- Mean anomaly: 245.72°
- Mean motion: 0° 10^{m} 55.56^{s} / day
- Inclination: 0.3995°
- Longitude of ascending node: 315.66°
- Argument of perihelion: 305.63°

Physical characteristics
- Mean diameter: 23.55 km (calculated); 24.33±6.61 km 24.44±1.22 km 25.76±7.43 km 28.463±0.354 km 28.532±0.238 km 28.9±15.91 km 31.19±15.91 km
- Synodic rotation period: 23.2±0.1 h
- Geometric albedo: 0.038±0.004; 0.050±0.040; 0.06±0.04; 0.0601±0.0049; 0.07±0.03; 0.08 (assumed); 0.093±0.010
- Spectral type: C (assumed)
- Absolute magnitude (H): 11.30 · 11.40; 11.46±0.36 · 11.5; 11.68

2324 Janice, provisional designation 1978 VS_{4}, is a dark background asteroid from the outer regions of the asteroid belt, approximately 25 kilometers (16 miles) in diameter. It was discovered on 7 November 1978, by American astronomers Eleanor Helin and Schelte Bus at the Palomar Observatory in California. The asteroid was named for Janice Cline at Caltech. The presumably C-type asteroid has a rotation period of 23.2 hours.

== Orbit and classification ==
Based on osculating Keplerian orbital elements, Janice is located in the region of the Themis family (602), a very large family of carbonaceous asteroids, named after 24 Themis.

When applying the hierarchical clustering method to its proper orbital elements, the object is both a non-family asteroid of the main belt's background population (according to Nesvorný), as well as a core member of the Themis family (according to Milani and Knežević).

It orbits the Sun in the outer main-belt at a distance of 2.5–3.6 AU once every 5 years and 5 months (1,977 days; semi-major axis of 3.08 AU). Its orbit has an eccentricity of 0.18 and an inclination of 0° with respect to the ecliptic. The body's observation arc begins with its first observation as A911 MC at Lowell Observatory in June 1911, more than 67 years prior to its official discovery observation at Palomar.

== Physical characteristics ==
Janice is a presumed carbonaceous C-type asteroid which is the overall spectral type of members of the Themis family (602).

=== Rotation period ===
In October 2010, a rotational lightcurve of Janice was obtained from photometric observations by Gordon Gartrelle at the University of North Dakota Observatory in Grand Forks (730). Lightcurve analysis gave a tentative rotation period of 23.2 hours with a brightness amplitude of 0.19 magnitude (U=2-). As of 2018, no secure period has been obtained.

=== Diameter and albedo ===
According to the surveys carried out by the Japanese Akari satellite and the NEOWISE mission of NASA's Wide-field Infrared Survey Explorer, Janice measures between 24.33 and 31.19 kilometers in diameter and its surface has an albedo between 0.038 and 0.093.

The Collaborative Asteroid Lightcurve Link assumes an albedo of 0.08 and calculates a diameter of 23.55 kilometers based on an absolute magnitude of 11.5.

== Naming ==
This minor planet was named after Janice Cline, who for many years has encouraged astrometric studies of minor planets at Caltech. The official naming citation was published by the Minor Planet Center on 1 March 1981 (M.P.C. 5850).
