= 2981 Chagall =

Main-belt asteroid

Discovery
- Discovered by: S. J. Bus
- Discovery site: Siding Spring Obs.
- Discovery date: 2 March 1981

Designations
- Named after: Marc Chagall
- Alternative designations: 1981 EE_{20} · 1954 LF; 1977 RN_{3}
- Minor planet category: main-belt · Themis

Orbital characteristics
- Epoch 4 September 2017 (JD 2458000.5)
- Uncertainty parameter 0
- Observation arc: 62.48 yr (22,822 days)
- Aphelion: 3.6918 AU
- Perihelion: 2.6122 AU
- Semi-major axis: 3.1520 AU
- Eccentricity: 0.1713
- Orbital period (sidereal): 5.60 yr (2,044 days)
- Mean anomaly: 92.248°
- Mean motion: 0° 10^{m} 33.96^{s} / day
- Inclination: 0.8657°
- Longitude of ascending node: 185.87°
- Argument of perihelion: 99.029°

Physical characteristics
- Dimensions: 15.489±0.617
- Synodic rotation period: 0.11232 h
- Geometric albedo: 0.117±0.031
- Absolute magnitude (H): 12.5

2981 Chagall, provisionally designated 1981 EE_{20}, is a Themistian asteroid from the asteroid belt, discovered on 2 March 1981 by American astronomer Schelte Bus at Siding Spring Observatory in New South Wales, Australia.

The asteroid was named after the Russian-French painter Marc Chagall (1887–1985).
