= 6216 San Jose =

Main-belt asteroid

Discovery
- Discovered by: S. J. Bus
- Discovery site: Palomar Obs.
- Discovery date: 30 September 1975

Designations
- Named after: San Jose (City in California)
- Alternative designations: 1975 SJ · 1975 VH_{2} 1984 SV_{4} · 1989 VG
- Minor planet category: main-belt · (middle) background

Orbital characteristics
- Epoch 23 March 2018 (JD 2458200.5)
- Uncertainty parameter 0
- Observation arc: 62.86 yr (22,961 d)
- Aphelion: 3.0346 AU
- Perihelion: 2.4719 AU
- Semi-major axis: 2.7533 AU
- Eccentricity: 0.1022
- Orbital period (sidereal): 4.57 yr (1,669 d)
- Mean anomaly: 68.316°
- Mean motion: 0° 12^{m} 56.52^{s} / day
- Inclination: 3.7717°
- Longitude of ascending node: 30.489°
- Argument of perihelion: 27.604°

Physical characteristics
- Mean diameter: 8.033±0.149 km
- Geometric albedo: 0.208±0.024
- Absolute magnitude (H): 13.0

6216 San Jose, provisional designation 1975 SJ, is a background asteroid from the central regions of the asteroid belt, approximately 8 kilometers (5 miles) in diameter. It was discovered on 30 September 1975, by American astronomer Schelte Bus at the Palomar Observatory. The asteroid was named for the city of San Jose in California.

== Orbit and classification ==
San Jose is a non-family asteroid from the main belt's background population. It orbits the Sun in the central asteroid belt at a distance of 2.5–3.0 AU once every 4 years and 7 months (1,669 days; semi-major axis of 2.75 AU). Its orbit has an eccentricity of 0.10 and an inclination of 4° with respect to the ecliptic. The body's observation arc begins with a precovery taken at Palomar in April 1954.

== Physical characteristics ==
San Jose's spectral type is unknown. Based on its albedo (see below), it is likely a stony S-type asteroid. It has an absolute magnitude of 13.0.

=== Diameter and albedo ===
According to the survey carried out by the NEOWISE mission of NASA's Wide-field Infrared Survey Explorer, San Jose measures 8.033 kilometers in diameter and its surface has an albedo of 0.208.

=== Rotation period ===
As of 2018, no rotational lightcurve of San Jose has been obtained from photometric observations. The body's rotation period, pole and shape remain unknown.

== Naming ==
This minor planet was named for the city of San Jose, California, United States, for its long support of nearby Lick Observatory particularly in efforts to reduce light pollution. The official naming citation was published by the Minor Planet Center on 14 December 1997 (M.P.C. 31024).
