= 4659 Roddenberry =

Main-belt asteroid

Discovery
- Discovered by: S. J. Bus
- Discovery site: Siding Spring Obs.
- Discovery date: 2 March 1981

Designations
- Named after: Gene Roddenberry (American screenwriter)
- Alternative designations: 1981 EP_{20} · 1979 SY_{7} 1979 TO_{1}
- Minor planet category: main-belt · (inner); Nysa–Polana complex

Orbital characteristics
- Epoch 23 March 2018 (JD 2458200.5)
- Uncertainty parameter 0
- Observation arc: 41.19 yr (15,044 d)
- Aphelion: 2.9019 AU
- Perihelion: 1.8408 AU
- Semi-major axis: 2.3714 AU
- Eccentricity: 0.2237
- Orbital period (sidereal): 3.65 yr (1,334 d)
- Mean anomaly: 188.19°
- Mean motion: 0° 16^{m} 11.64^{s} / day
- Inclination: 2.4668°
- Longitude of ascending node: 19.633°
- Argument of perihelion: 5.1337°

Physical characteristics
- Mean diameter: 3.56 km (derived); 3.622±0.601 km
- Synodic rotation period: 12 h (poor)
- Geometric albedo: 0.193±0.065; 0.20 (assumed)
- Spectral type: S (assumed)
- Absolute magnitude (H): 14.4; 14.61; 14.78±0.28

4659 Roddenberry, provisional designation 1981 EP_{20}, is an asteroid located in the inner region of the asteroid belt, approximately 3.6 kilometers (2.2 miles) in diameter. It was discovered on 2 March 1981, by American astronomer Schelte Bus at the Siding Spring Observatory in Australia. The likely S-type asteroid has an unsecured rotation period of 12 hours. It was named for American screenwriter Gene Roddenberry.

== Orbit and classification ==
The asteroid orbits the Sun in the inner asteroid belt at a distance of 1.8–2.9 AU once every 3 years and 8 months (1,334 days; semi-major axis of 2.37 AU). Its orbit has an eccentricity of 0.22 and an inclination of 2° with respect to the ecliptic. Roddenberry is a member of the Nysa–Polana complex, a collection of overlapping asteroid families in the inner main belt. The body's observation arc begins with a precovery taken at Palomar Observatory in February 1977, or four years prior to its official discovery observation at Siding Spring.

=== Rotation period ===
In the 1990s, a fragmentary rotational lightcurve of Roddenberry was obtained from photometric observations by Richard Binzel. Lightcurve analysis gave a highly uncertain rotation period of 12 hours with a brightness amplitude of 0.14 magnitude (U=1). As of 2018, no secure period has been obtained.

=== Diameter and albedo ===
According to the survey carried out by the NEOWISE mission of NASA's Wide-field Infrared Survey Explorer, Roddenberry measures 3.622 kilometers in diameter and its surface has an albedo of 0.193, while the Collaborative Asteroid Lightcurve Link assumes a standard albedo for stony asteroids of 0.20, and derives a diameter of 3.56 kilometers based on an absolute magnitude of 14.61.

== Naming ==
This minor planet was named in memory of famous American screenwriter, producer and futurist, Gene Roddenberry (1921–1991), known for the Star Trek and Star Trek: The Next Generation television series, and for the Star Trek film franchise. The official naming citation was published by the Minor Planet Center on 18 February 1992 (M.P.C. 19698).
