= 2285 Ron Helin =

Main-belt asteroid

Discovery
- Discovered by: S. J. Bus
- Discovery site: Palomar Obs.
- Discovery date: 27 August 1976

Designations
- Named after: Ronald P. Helin husband of astronomer Eleanor F. Helin
- Alternative designations: 1976 QB
- Minor planet category: main-belt · Flora

Orbital characteristics
- Epoch 4 September 2017 (JD 2458000.5)
- Uncertainty parameter 0
- Observation arc: 40.54 yr (14,807 days)
- Aphelion: 2.6815 AU
- Perihelion: 1.7578 AU
- Semi-major axis: 2.2197 AU
- Eccentricity: 0.2081
- Orbital period (sidereal): 3.31 yr (1,208 days)
- Mean anomaly: 139.05°
- Mean motion: 0° 17^{m} 52.8^{s} / day
- Inclination: 5.3339°
- Longitude of ascending node: 157.85°
- Argument of perihelion: 182.81°

Physical characteristics
- Dimensions: 4.11 km (calculated)
- Synodic rotation period: 12 h
- Geometric albedo: 0.24 (assumed)
- Spectral type: S
- Absolute magnitude (H): 14.0 · 14.1

2285 Ron Helin, provisional designation 1976 QB, is a stony Florian asteroid from the inner region of the asteroid belt, approximately 4 kilometers in diameter. It was discovered on 27 August 1976, by American astronomer Schelte Bus at Palomar Observatory in San Diego County, California.

== Orbit and characterization ==
Ron Helin is a member of the Flora family, one of the largest groups of stony asteroids in the main-belt. It orbits the Sun in the inner main-belt at a distance of 1.8–2.7 AU once every 3 years and 4 months (1,208 days). Its orbit has an eccentricity of 0.21 and an inclination of 5° with respect to the ecliptic. Its rotation period is 12 hours.

== Naming ==
This minor planet was named in honor of Ronald Helin, husband of American astronomer Eleanor Helin (1932–2009), in appreciation of his support of the Palomar Planet-Crossing Asteroid Survey (PCAS). The approved naming citation was published by the Minor Planet Center on 11 December 1981 (M.P.C. 6531).
