= 4923 Clarke =

Asteroid

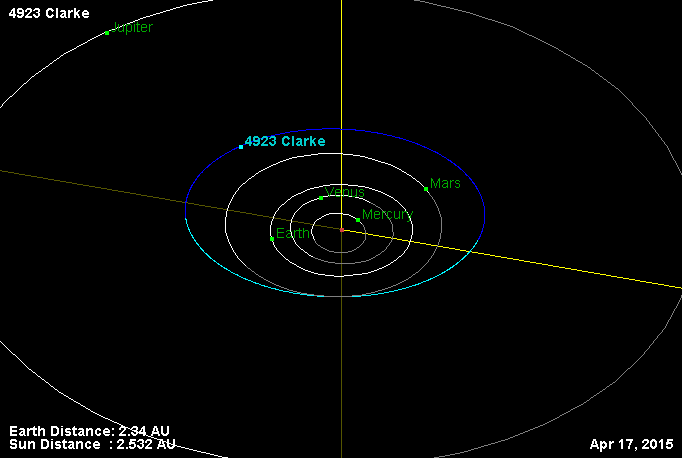
- Orbital diagram of Clarke

Discovery
- Discovered by: S. J. Bus
- Discovery site: Siding Spring Obs.
- Discovery date: 2 March 1981

Designations
- Named after: Arthur C. Clarke (British science fiction writer)
- Alternative designations: 1981 EO_{27} · 1972 NJ
- Minor planet category: main-belt · (inner) background

Orbital characteristics
- Epoch 23 March 2018 (JD 2458200.5)
- Uncertainty parameter 0
- Observation arc: 45.53 yr (16,631 d)
- Aphelion: 2.5774 AU
- Perihelion: 1.7121 AU
- Semi-major axis: 2.1448 AU
- Eccentricity: 0.2017
- Orbital period (sidereal): 3.14 yr (1,147 d)
- Mean anomaly: 187.58°
- Mean motion: 0° 18^{m} 49.68^{s} / day
- Inclination: 6.6759°
- Longitude of ascending node: 188.51°
- Argument of perihelion: 108.65°

Physical characteristics
- Mean diameter: 3.367±0.033 km 3.532±0.033 km 4.10 km (calculated)
- Synodic rotation period: 3.143±0.016 h 3.1787±0.0009 h (Note: Lightcurve plot of (4923) Clarke, (Pravec 2013) from August 2013 web: rotation period 3.18±0.0008 hours with a brightness amplitude of 0.03±0.01 mag. Quality code is 2-. Summary figures at the LCDB and Pravec, P.; Wolf, M.; Sarounova, L. (2013).); 27.253±0.0553 h
- Geometric albedo: 0.20 (assumed); 0.3259±0.0644; 0.366±0.066
- Spectral type: SMASS = S
- Absolute magnitude (H): 13.98±0.31; 14.1; 14.222±0.004 (R); 14.3

4923 Clarke, provisional designation 1981 EO_{27}, is a stony background asteroid from the inner regions of the asteroid belt, approximately 3.5 kilometers (2.2 miles) in diameter. It was discovered on 2 March 1981, by American astronomer Schelte Bus at the Siding Spring Observatory in Australia. The spheroidal S-type asteroid has a rotation period of 3.14 hours. It was named after British science fiction writer Arthur C. Clarke. On the same night, Schelte Bus also discovered 5020 Asimov.

== Orbit and classification ==
Clarke is a non-family asteroid from the main belt's background population. It orbits the Sun in the inner main-belt at a distance of 1.7–2.6 AU once every 3 years and 2 months (1,147 days; semi-major axis of 2.14 AU). Its orbit has an eccentricity of 0.20 and an inclination of 7° with respect to the ecliptic.

The asteroid was first observed as 1972 NJ at Crimea–Nauchnij in July 1972. The body's observation arc begins at the Siding Spring Observatory two weeks prior to its official discovery observation on 12 February 1981.

== Physical characteristics ==
In the SMASS classification, Clarke is a common, stony S-type asteroid.

=== Rotation period ===
Three rotational lightcurves of Clarke have been obtained from photometric observations by the APT Observatory Group in Spain, by astronomers at the Palomar Transient Factory in California, and by Czech astronomer Petr Pravec at Ondřejov Observatory (U=2/1/2-). Analysis of the best-rated lightcurve gave a rotation period of 3.143 hours with a consolidated brightness amplitude between 0.03 and 0.14 magnitude, which indicates that the body has a nearly spheroidal, non-elongated shape (U=2).

=== Diameter and albedo ===
According to the survey carried out by the NEOWISE mission of NASA's Wide-field Infrared Survey Explorer, Clarke measures between 3.367 and 3.532 kilometers in diameter and its surface has an albedo between 0.3259 and 0.366. The Collaborative Asteroid Lightcurve Link assumes an albedo of 0.20 and calculates a diameter of 4.10 kilometers based on an absolute magnitude of 14.3.

== Naming ==
This minor planet was named after the science fiction writer Arthur C. Clarke (1917–2008), author of 2001: A Space Odyssey. The official naming citation was prepared with assistance from Richard Binzel and published by the Minor Planet Center on 3 May 1996 (M.P.C. 27127). The asteroid's name independently suggested by Duncan Steel (M.P.C. 27147).

In the postscript to his novel 3001: The Final Odyssey, Clarke jokingly expresses disappointment that he did not receive asteroid 2001 as his namesake; instead, it was named for Albert Einstein.
