= List of minor planets: 783001–784000 =

The following is a partial list of minor planets, running from minor-planet number 783001 through 784000, inclusive. The primary data for this and other partial lists is based on JPL's "Small-Body Orbital Elements" and data available from the Minor Planet Center. Critical list information is also provided by the MPC, unless otherwise specified from Lowell Observatory. A detailed description of the table's columns and additional sources are given on the main page including a complete list of every page in this series, and a statistical break-up on the dynamical classification of minor planets.

Also see the summary list of all named bodies in numerical and alphabetical order, and the corresponding naming citations for the number range of this particular list. New namings may only be added to this list after official publication, as the preannouncement of names is condemned by the Working Group for Small Bodies Nomenclature of the International Astronomical Union.

Near-Earth obj.	MBA (inner)	MBA (outer)	Centaur
Mars-crosser	MBA (middle)	Jupiter trojan	Trans-Neptunian obj.
Unclassified

== 783001–783100 ==
Designation			Discovery			Properties		Ref
Permanent	Provisional	Named after	Date	Site	Discoverer(s)	Category	Diam.	Ref
783001	2014 OZ_{26}	—	July 25, 2014	Haleakala	Pan-STARRS 1	HNS	650 m	MPC · JPL
783002	2014 OL_{29}	—	October 17, 2010	Mount Lemmon	Mount Lemmon Survey	KOR	980 m	MPC · JPL
783003	2014 OW_{34}	—	July 25, 2014	Haleakala	Pan-STARRS 1	·	1.3 km	MPC · JPL
783004	2014 OE_{37}	—	July 25, 2014	Haleakala	Pan-STARRS 1	·	1.5 km	MPC · JPL
783005	2014 OT_{37}	—	July 25, 2014	Haleakala	Pan-STARRS 1	·	1.2 km	MPC · JPL
783006	2014 OV_{37}	—	July 25, 2014	Haleakala	Pan-STARRS 1	·	840 m	MPC · JPL
783007	2014 OL_{38}	—	July 3, 2014	Haleakala	Pan-STARRS 1	·	870 m	MPC · JPL
783008	2014 OY_{43}	—	August 29, 2006	Kitt Peak	Spacewatch	(5)	880 m	MPC · JPL
783009	2014 OT_{47}	—	July 3, 2014	Haleakala	Pan-STARRS 1	AGN	870 m	MPC · JPL
783010	2014 OW_{47}	—	January 26, 2012	Mount Lemmon	Mount Lemmon Survey	EUN	970 m	MPC · JPL
783011	2014 OL_{49}	—	July 25, 2014	Haleakala	Pan-STARRS 1	·	860 m	MPC · JPL
783012	2014 OY_{51}	—	January 25, 2006	Kitt Peak	Spacewatch	·	2.2 km	MPC · JPL
783013	2014 OB_{58}	—	July 25, 2014	Haleakala	Pan-STARRS 1	AEO	850 m	MPC · JPL
783014	2014 OY_{59}	—	July 25, 2014	Haleakala	Pan-STARRS 1	·	1.4 km	MPC · JPL
783015	2014 OH_{66}	—	November 1, 2010	Mount Lemmon	Mount Lemmon Survey	AGN	780 m	MPC · JPL
783016	2014 OG_{68}	—	July 25, 2014	Haleakala	Pan-STARRS 1	·	1.5 km	MPC · JPL
783017	2014 OZ_{69}	—	July 25, 2014	Haleakala	Pan-STARRS 1	·	1.3 km	MPC · JPL
783018	2014 OV_{71}	—	July 25, 2014	Haleakala	Pan-STARRS 1	(5)	1.1 km	MPC · JPL
783019	2014 OO_{75}	—	July 1, 2014	Haleakala	Pan-STARRS 1	·	2.8 km	MPC · JPL
783020	2014 OJ_{77}	—	July 26, 2014	Haleakala	Pan-STARRS 1	·	1.1 km	MPC · JPL
783021	2014 OL_{82}	—	September 17, 2006	Kitt Peak	Spacewatch	·	920 m	MPC · JPL
783022	2014 OW_{84}	—	November 2, 2010	Mount Lemmon	Mount Lemmon Survey	·	1.3 km	MPC · JPL
783023	2014 OY_{96}	—	February 4, 2012	Haleakala	Pan-STARRS 1	HNS	860 m	MPC · JPL
783024	2014 OW_{97}	—	February 3, 2012	Haleakala	Pan-STARRS 1	GAL	1.3 km	MPC · JPL
783025	2014 OF_{99}	—	January 15, 2011	Mount Lemmon	Mount Lemmon Survey	VER	2.1 km	MPC · JPL
783026	2014 OZ_{102}	—	July 7, 2014	Haleakala	Pan-STARRS 1	·	1.2 km	MPC · JPL
783027	2014 OK_{103}	—	January 27, 2011	Mount Lemmon	Mount Lemmon Survey	·	2.2 km	MPC · JPL
783028	2014 OX_{108}	—	July 27, 2014	Haleakala	Pan-STARRS 1	·	1.1 km	MPC · JPL
783029	2014 OV_{110}	—	October 6, 2007	Kitt Peak	Spacewatch	3:2 · SHU	3.7 km	MPC · JPL
783030	2014 OL_{112}	—	July 28, 2009	Kitt Peak	Spacewatch	·	1.6 km	MPC · JPL
783031	2014 OU_{114}	—	July 25, 2014	Haleakala	Pan-STARRS 1	·	3.0 km	MPC · JPL
783032	2014 OW_{116}	—	July 25, 2014	Haleakala	Pan-STARRS 1	·	910 m	MPC · JPL
783033	2014 OR_{119}	—	July 25, 2014	Haleakala	Pan-STARRS 1	·	2.2 km	MPC · JPL
783034	2014 OA_{121}	—	July 25, 2014	Haleakala	Pan-STARRS 1	·	1.2 km	MPC · JPL
783035	2014 OP_{121}	—	March 8, 2013	Haleakala	Pan-STARRS 1	·	790 m	MPC · JPL
783036	2014 OB_{129}	—	July 25, 2014	Haleakala	Pan-STARRS 1	·	2.0 km	MPC · JPL
783037	2014 OE_{134}	—	March 5, 2013	Haleakala	Pan-STARRS 1	·	890 m	MPC · JPL
783038	2014 OL_{135}	—	July 27, 2014	Haleakala	Pan-STARRS 1	KOR	920 m	MPC · JPL
783039	2014 OZ_{136}	—	July 25, 2014	Haleakala	Pan-STARRS 1	·	1.3 km	MPC · JPL
783040	2014 OY_{137}	—	February 16, 2013	Mount Lemmon	Mount Lemmon Survey	EUN	800 m	MPC · JPL
783041	2014 OE_{138}	—	November 11, 2010	Mount Lemmon	Mount Lemmon Survey	·	1.3 km	MPC · JPL
783042	2014 OY_{138}	—	October 9, 2010	Kitt Peak	Spacewatch	HOF	1.9 km	MPC · JPL
783043	2014 OK_{140}	—	July 25, 2014	Haleakala	Pan-STARRS 1	AGN	850 m	MPC · JPL
783044	2014 OW_{140}	—	June 27, 2014	Haleakala	Pan-STARRS 1	GEF	960 m	MPC · JPL
783045	2014 OQ_{142}	—	April 2, 2013	Mount Lemmon	Mount Lemmon Survey	·	870 m	MPC · JPL
783046	2014 OK_{144}	—	July 27, 2014	Haleakala	Pan-STARRS 1	·	1.3 km	MPC · JPL
783047	2014 ON_{144}	—	July 27, 2014	Haleakala	Pan-STARRS 1	MAR	670 m	MPC · JPL
783048	2014 OE_{146}	—	July 27, 2014	Haleakala	Pan-STARRS 1	·	1.1 km	MPC · JPL
783049	2014 OV_{146}	—	July 27, 2014	Haleakala	Pan-STARRS 1	·	1.2 km	MPC · JPL
783050	2014 OJ_{152}	—	July 27, 2014	Haleakala	Pan-STARRS 1	·	1.2 km	MPC · JPL
783051	2014 OU_{152}	—	July 27, 2014	Haleakala	Pan-STARRS 1	·	1.1 km	MPC · JPL
783052	2014 OG_{162}	—	June 25, 2014	Mount Lemmon	Mount Lemmon Survey	EUN	840 m	MPC · JPL
783053	2014 OP_{162}	—	July 27, 2014	Haleakala	Pan-STARRS 1	HNS	690 m	MPC · JPL
783054	2014 OY_{165}	—	September 11, 2010	Mount Lemmon	Mount Lemmon Survey	·	1.1 km	MPC · JPL
783055	2014 OF_{171}	—	January 18, 2008	Mount Lemmon	Mount Lemmon Survey	HNS	790 m	MPC · JPL
783056	2014 ON_{173}	—	July 3, 2014	Haleakala	Pan-STARRS 1	EUN	970 m	MPC · JPL
783057	2014 OD_{177}	—	June 4, 2014	Haleakala	Pan-STARRS 1	LEO	1.3 km	MPC · JPL
783058	2014 OL_{177}	—	January 29, 2009	Mount Lemmon	Mount Lemmon Survey	·	860 m	MPC · JPL
783059	2014 OR_{178}	—	April 1, 2013	Kitt Peak	Spacewatch	·	1.0 km	MPC · JPL
783060	2014 OM_{189}	—	July 27, 2014	Haleakala	Pan-STARRS 1	·	1.3 km	MPC · JPL
783061	2014 OR_{191}	—	July 27, 2014	Haleakala	Pan-STARRS 1	·	2.0 km	MPC · JPL
783062	2014 OK_{196}	—	July 27, 2014	Haleakala	Pan-STARRS 1	·	1.1 km	MPC · JPL
783063	2014 OW_{200}	—	July 4, 2014	Haleakala	Pan-STARRS 1	EOS	1.4 km	MPC · JPL
783064	2014 OD_{211}	—	February 10, 2008	Kitt Peak	Spacewatch	·	1.2 km	MPC · JPL
783065	2014 ON_{216}	—	December 25, 2011	Mount Lemmon	Mount Lemmon Survey	(5)	1 km	MPC · JPL
783066	2014 OV_{223}	—	July 27, 2014	Haleakala	Pan-STARRS 1	·	1.8 km	MPC · JPL
783067	2014 OP_{227}	—	July 27, 2014	Haleakala	Pan-STARRS 1	HNS	920 m	MPC · JPL
783068	2014 OQ_{230}	—	July 27, 2014	Haleakala	Pan-STARRS 1	·	1.2 km	MPC · JPL
783069	2014 ON_{236}	—	January 17, 2013	Haleakala	Pan-STARRS 1	·	890 m	MPC · JPL
783070	2014 OQ_{244}	—	November 5, 2010	Mount Lemmon	Mount Lemmon Survey	EOS	1.4 km	MPC · JPL
783071	2014 OQ_{245}	—	July 29, 2014	Haleakala	Pan-STARRS 1	·	1.3 km	MPC · JPL
783072	2014 ON_{247}	—	July 27, 2014	Haleakala	Pan-STARRS 1	·	2.0 km	MPC · JPL
783073	2014 OF_{249}	—	July 25, 2014	Haleakala	Pan-STARRS 1	·	1.2 km	MPC · JPL
783074	2014 OK_{256}	—	July 29, 2014	Haleakala	Pan-STARRS 1	·	3.0 km	MPC · JPL
783075	2014 OR_{278}	—	July 4, 2005	Mount Lemmon	Mount Lemmon Survey	·	1.2 km	MPC · JPL
783076	2014 OO_{283}	—	January 11, 2008	Kitt Peak	Spacewatch	HNS	710 m	MPC · JPL
783077	2014 OV_{295}	—	September 12, 2005	Kitt Peak	Spacewatch	·	1.3 km	MPC · JPL
783078	2014 OG_{301}	—	October 16, 2009	Mount Lemmon	Mount Lemmon Survey	THM	1.8 km	MPC · JPL
783079	2014 OZ_{303}	—	July 3, 2014	Haleakala	Pan-STARRS 1	·	1.0 km	MPC · JPL
783080	2014 OY_{312}	—	July 27, 2014	Haleakala	Pan-STARRS 1	·	1.2 km	MPC · JPL
783081	2014 OF_{316}	—	July 28, 2014	Haleakala	Pan-STARRS 1	·	1.2 km	MPC · JPL
783082	2014 OH_{316}	—	April 17, 2013	Cerro Tololo-DECam	DECam	·	1.1 km	MPC · JPL
783083	2014 OM_{317}	—	July 28, 2014	Haleakala	Pan-STARRS 1	·	1.1 km	MPC · JPL
783084	2014 OV_{324}	—	July 25, 2014	Haleakala	Pan-STARRS 1	·	1.3 km	MPC · JPL
783085	2014 OL_{325}	—	January 27, 2011	Mount Lemmon	Mount Lemmon Survey	·	2.7 km	MPC · JPL
783086	2014 OV_{330}	—	July 29, 2014	Haleakala	Pan-STARRS 1	AGN	760 m	MPC · JPL
783087	2014 OG_{331}	—	July 29, 2014	Haleakala	Pan-STARRS 1	·	1.0 km	MPC · JPL
783088	2014 OP_{345}	—	March 6, 2008	Mount Lemmon	Mount Lemmon Survey	·	1.4 km	MPC · JPL
783089	2014 OR_{351}	—	July 28, 2014	Haleakala	Pan-STARRS 1	·	950 m	MPC · JPL
783090	2014 OC_{361}	—	July 28, 2014	Haleakala	Pan-STARRS 1	·	1.6 km	MPC · JPL
783091	2014 OQ_{361}	—	July 29, 2014	Haleakala	Pan-STARRS 1	·	830 m	MPC · JPL
783092	2014 OO_{362}	—	July 29, 2014	Haleakala	Pan-STARRS 1	EOS	1.2 km	MPC · JPL
783093	2014 OD_{369}	—	July 30, 2014	Haleakala	Pan-STARRS 1	·	1.2 km	MPC · JPL
783094	2014 OK_{370}	—	July 30, 2014	Haleakala	Pan-STARRS 1	·	710 m	MPC · JPL
783095	2014 OH_{371}	—	July 25, 2014	Haleakala	Pan-STARRS 1	·	1.2 km	MPC · JPL
783096	2014 OO_{380}	—	May 31, 2014	Haleakala	Pan-STARRS 1	DOR	1.8 km	MPC · JPL
783097	2014 OP_{396}	—	July 25, 2014	Haleakala	Pan-STARRS 1	·	1.1 km	MPC · JPL
783098	2014 OA_{397}	—	July 25, 2014	Haleakala	Pan-STARRS 1	·	1.4 km	MPC · JPL
783099	2014 OH_{399}	—	July 25, 2014	Haleakala	Pan-STARRS 1	KOR	850 m	MPC · JPL
783100	2014 OG_{400}	—	March 8, 2013	Haleakala	Pan-STARRS 1	·	910 m	MPC · JPL

== 783101–783200 ==
back to top

Designation			Discovery			Properties		Ref
Permanent	Provisional	Named after	Date	Site	Discoverer(s)	Category	Diam.	Ref
783101	2014 OL_{403}	—	July 25, 2014	Haleakala	Pan-STARRS 1	·	1.2 km	MPC · JPL
783102	2014 OJ_{404}	—	July 25, 2014	Haleakala	Pan-STARRS 1	·	1.2 km	MPC · JPL
783103	2014 OB_{405}	—	June 6, 2014	Haleakala	Pan-STARRS 1	·	1.1 km	MPC · JPL
783104	2014 OG_{406}	—	July 25, 2014	Haleakala	Pan-STARRS 1	·	1.6 km	MPC · JPL
783105	2014 OH_{406}	—	July 25, 2014	Haleakala	Pan-STARRS 1	·	1.2 km	MPC · JPL
783106	2014 OQ_{406}	—	July 25, 2014	Haleakala	Pan-STARRS 1	·	910 m	MPC · JPL
783107	2014 OZ_{406}	—	July 6, 2014	Haleakala	Pan-STARRS 1	·	1.5 km	MPC · JPL
783108	2014 OM_{407}	—	April 10, 2013	Haleakala	Pan-STARRS 1	·	1 km	MPC · JPL
783109	2014 OV_{407}	—	July 25, 2014	Haleakala	Pan-STARRS 1	(12739)	1.2 km	MPC · JPL
783110	2014 OZ_{408}	—	July 25, 2014	Haleakala	Pan-STARRS 1	KOR	1.1 km	MPC · JPL
783111	2014 OC_{409}	—	July 25, 2014	Haleakala	Pan-STARRS 1	·	1.1 km	MPC · JPL
783112	2014 OA_{410}	—	July 26, 2014	Haleakala	Pan-STARRS 1	(5)	980 m	MPC · JPL
783113	2014 OF_{414}	—	July 31, 2014	Haleakala	Pan-STARRS 1	·	1.6 km	MPC · JPL
783114	2014 OR_{414}	—	November 13, 2010	Mount Lemmon	Mount Lemmon Survey	·	1.2 km	MPC · JPL
783115	2014 OD_{415}	—	July 31, 2014	Haleakala	Pan-STARRS 1	GEF	850 m	MPC · JPL
783116	2014 OK_{416}	—	January 28, 2017	Haleakala	Pan-STARRS 1	·	1.1 km	MPC · JPL
783117	2014 OS_{421}	—	March 16, 2012	Mount Lemmon	Mount Lemmon Survey	·	2.6 km	MPC · JPL
783118	2014 OA_{422}	—	October 21, 2015	Haleakala	Pan-STARRS 1	·	990 m	MPC · JPL
783119	2014 OJ_{430}	—	July 25, 2014	Haleakala	Pan-STARRS 1	·	1.0 km	MPC · JPL
783120	2014 OL_{430}	—	September 30, 2010	Mount Lemmon	Mount Lemmon Survey	·	1.0 km	MPC · JPL
783121	2014 OA_{432}	—	July 28, 2014	Haleakala	Pan-STARRS 1	KOR	980 m	MPC · JPL
783122	2014 OC_{432}	—	July 28, 2014	Haleakala	Pan-STARRS 1	·	1.2 km	MPC · JPL
783123	2014 OE_{432}	—	July 28, 2014	Haleakala	Pan-STARRS 1	PAD	1 km	MPC · JPL
783124	2014 OH_{432}	—	July 25, 2014	Haleakala	Pan-STARRS 1	·	1.4 km	MPC · JPL
783125	2014 ON_{432}	—	July 31, 2014	Haleakala	Pan-STARRS 1	·	1.3 km	MPC · JPL
783126	2014 OV_{432}	—	July 29, 2014	Haleakala	Pan-STARRS 1	·	1.2 km	MPC · JPL
783127	2014 OY_{432}	—	July 25, 2014	Haleakala	Pan-STARRS 1	·	1.2 km	MPC · JPL
783128	2014 OA_{435}	—	July 26, 2014	Haleakala	Pan-STARRS 1	·	950 m	MPC · JPL
783129 Danescu	2014 OS_{442}	Danescu	July 29, 2014	La Palma	EURONEAR	EOS	1.4 km	MPC · JPL
783130	2014 OJ_{443}	—	July 27, 2014	Haleakala	Pan-STARRS 1	·	1.2 km	MPC · JPL
783131	2014 OL_{443}	—	July 29, 2014	Haleakala	Pan-STARRS 1	·	1.5 km	MPC · JPL
783132	2014 OZ_{446}	—	July 28, 2014	Haleakala	Pan-STARRS 1	·	1.4 km	MPC · JPL
783133	2014 OL_{447}	—	July 29, 2014	Haleakala	Pan-STARRS 1	HNS	840 m	MPC · JPL
783134	2014 OX_{452}	—	July 25, 2014	Haleakala	Pan-STARRS 1	·	1.2 km	MPC · JPL
783135	2014 OO_{454}	—	July 28, 2014	Haleakala	Pan-STARRS 1	·	690 m	MPC · JPL
783136	2014 OL_{455}	—	July 30, 2014	Haleakala	Pan-STARRS 1	·	1.3 km	MPC · JPL
783137	2014 OC_{462}	—	February 1, 2006	Mount Lemmon	Mount Lemmon Survey	·	2.3 km	MPC · JPL
783138	2014 OD_{462}	—	July 25, 2014	Haleakala	Pan-STARRS 1	·	1.2 km	MPC · JPL
783139	2014 OJ_{468}	—	April 2, 2013	Mount Lemmon	Mount Lemmon Survey	·	1.3 km	MPC · JPL
783140	2014 OJ_{469}	—	July 25, 2014	ESA OGS	ESA OGS	T_{j} (2.95) · 3:2	3.7 km	MPC · JPL
783141	2014 OZ_{471}	—	September 26, 2006	Kitt Peak	Spacewatch	·	950 m	MPC · JPL
783142	2014 OR_{488}	—	July 27, 2014	Haleakala	Pan-STARRS 1	·	1.3 km	MPC · JPL
783143	2014 OG_{489}	—	July 28, 2014	Haleakala	Pan-STARRS 1	·	1.3 km	MPC · JPL
783144	2014 PH_{9}	—	February 3, 2008	Mount Lemmon	Mount Lemmon Survey	HNS	780 m	MPC · JPL
783145	2014 PA_{13}	—	March 13, 2013	Mount Lemmon	Mount Lemmon Survey	·	780 m	MPC · JPL
783146	2014 PJ_{21}	—	July 25, 2014	Haleakala	Pan-STARRS 1	·	1.1 km	MPC · JPL
783147	2014 PE_{24}	—	August 3, 2014	Haleakala	Pan-STARRS 1	·	820 m	MPC · JPL
783148	2014 PV_{25}	—	March 19, 2013	Haleakala	Pan-STARRS 1	AEO	900 m	MPC · JPL
783149	2014 PS_{30}	—	July 25, 2014	Haleakala	Pan-STARRS 1	·	1.3 km	MPC · JPL
783150	2014 PA_{70}	—	June 21, 2014	Mount Lemmon	Mount Lemmon Survey	·	1.9 km	MPC · JPL
783151	2014 PF_{72}	—	August 31, 2005	Kitt Peak	Spacewatch	AEO	880 m	MPC · JPL
783152	2014 PT_{73}	—	August 3, 2014	Haleakala	Pan-STARRS 1	·	790 m	MPC · JPL
783153	2014 PJ_{76}	—	August 3, 2014	Haleakala	Pan-STARRS 1	KOR	910 m	MPC · JPL
783154	2014 PT_{77}	—	August 6, 2014	Haleakala	Pan-STARRS 1	WIT	700 m	MPC · JPL
783155	2014 PH_{83}	—	August 3, 2014	Haleakala	Pan-STARRS 1	·	1.7 km	MPC · JPL
783156	2014 PN_{87}	—	April 16, 2013	Cerro Tololo-DECam	DECam	·	800 m	MPC · JPL
783157	2014 PO_{87}	—	August 3, 2014	Haleakala	Pan-STARRS 1	·	860 m	MPC · JPL
783158	2014 PP_{88}	—	August 3, 2014	Haleakala	Pan-STARRS 1	·	2.0 km	MPC · JPL
783159	2014 PW_{88}	—	August 3, 2014	Haleakala	Pan-STARRS 1	·	1.1 km	MPC · JPL
783160	2014 PU_{89}	—	August 3, 2014	Haleakala	Pan-STARRS 1	·	1.2 km	MPC · JPL
783161	2014 PT_{90}	—	August 3, 2014	Haleakala	Pan-STARRS 1	KOR	950 m	MPC · JPL
783162	2014 PP_{91}	—	August 3, 2014	Haleakala	Pan-STARRS 1	·	1.1 km	MPC · JPL
783163	2014 PS_{92}	—	August 3, 2014	Haleakala	Pan-STARRS 1	·	1.1 km	MPC · JPL
783164	2014 PW_{93}	—	January 7, 2006	Kitt Peak	Spacewatch	·	2.2 km	MPC · JPL
783165	2014 PD_{94}	—	August 3, 2014	Haleakala	Pan-STARRS 1	HNS	700 m	MPC · JPL
783166	2014 PS_{100}	—	August 3, 2014	Haleakala	Pan-STARRS 1	·	1.7 km	MPC · JPL
783167	2014 PP_{103}	—	August 15, 2014	Haleakala	Pan-STARRS 1	·	1.2 km	MPC · JPL
783168	2014 PF_{104}	—	August 3, 2014	Haleakala	Pan-STARRS 1	·	1.1 km	MPC · JPL
783169	2014 PN_{105}	—	August 3, 2014	Haleakala	Pan-STARRS 1	·	2.0 km	MPC · JPL
783170	2014 PZ_{115}	—	August 3, 2014	Haleakala	Pan-STARRS 1	·	1.8 km	MPC · JPL
783171	2014 QB_{13}	—	June 3, 2014	Haleakala	Pan-STARRS 1	·	1.1 km	MPC · JPL
783172	2014 QA_{17}	—	September 14, 2006	Kitt Peak	Spacewatch	MAR	620 m	MPC · JPL
783173	2014 QZ_{29}	—	January 19, 2012	Mount Lemmon	Mount Lemmon Survey	·	940 m	MPC · JPL
783174	2014 QO_{34}	—	July 4, 2014	Haleakala	Pan-STARRS 1	·	940 m	MPC · JPL
783175	2014 QK_{36}	—	October 12, 2010	Mount Lemmon	Mount Lemmon Survey	AGN	800 m	MPC · JPL
783176	2014 QZ_{38}	—	December 30, 2007	Kitt Peak	Spacewatch	·	990 m	MPC · JPL
783177	2014 QN_{42}	—	October 4, 1997	Kitt Peak	Spacewatch	·	1.1 km	MPC · JPL
783178	2014 QO_{44}	—	July 2, 2014	Haleakala	Pan-STARRS 1	·	910 m	MPC · JPL
783179	2014 QS_{44}	—	October 21, 2006	Mount Lemmon	Mount Lemmon Survey	·	1.0 km	MPC · JPL
783180	2014 QA_{48}	—	July 4, 2014	Haleakala	Pan-STARRS 1	·	2.1 km	MPC · JPL
783181	2014 QR_{55}	—	January 4, 2012	Mount Lemmon	Mount Lemmon Survey	·	1.1 km	MPC · JPL
783182	2014 QD_{56}	—	August 20, 2014	Haleakala	Pan-STARRS 1	EOS	1.5 km	MPC · JPL
783183	2014 QF_{56}	—	March 10, 2007	Mount Lemmon	Mount Lemmon Survey	EOS	1.4 km	MPC · JPL
783184	2014 QY_{57}	—	July 28, 2014	Haleakala	Pan-STARRS 1	·	2.5 km	MPC · JPL
783185	2014 QA_{60}	—	March 15, 2013	Mount Lemmon	Mount Lemmon Survey	·	1.0 km	MPC · JPL
783186	2014 QS_{60}	—	July 1, 2014	Haleakala	Pan-STARRS 1	HNS	760 m	MPC · JPL
783187	2014 QO_{61}	—	July 28, 2014	Haleakala	Pan-STARRS 1	WIT	710 m	MPC · JPL
783188	2014 QM_{66}	—	August 20, 2014	Haleakala	Pan-STARRS 1	·	1.1 km	MPC · JPL
783189	2014 QH_{67}	—	August 20, 2014	Haleakala	Pan-STARRS 1	·	1.4 km	MPC · JPL
783190	2014 QO_{70}	—	January 1, 2012	Mount Lemmon	Mount Lemmon Survey	·	1.1 km	MPC · JPL
783191	2014 QB_{72}	—	September 5, 2010	Mount Lemmon	Mount Lemmon Survey	·	950 m	MPC · JPL
783192	2014 QM_{78}	—	July 7, 2014	Haleakala	Pan-STARRS 1	·	870 m	MPC · JPL
783193	2014 QN_{78}	—	December 27, 2011	Mount Lemmon	Mount Lemmon Survey	·	900 m	MPC · JPL
783194	2014 QR_{80}	—	August 20, 2014	Haleakala	Pan-STARRS 1	·	1.3 km	MPC · JPL
783195	2014 QW_{89}	—	August 20, 2014	Haleakala	Pan-STARRS 1	·	1.1 km	MPC · JPL
783196	2014 QQ_{93}	—	August 20, 2014	Haleakala	Pan-STARRS 1	·	1.4 km	MPC · JPL
783197	2014 QR_{93}	—	June 29, 2014	Mount Lemmon	Mount Lemmon Survey	·	850 m	MPC · JPL
783198	2014 QW_{94}	—	August 20, 2014	Haleakala	Pan-STARRS 1	EOS	1.4 km	MPC · JPL
783199	2014 QU_{99}	—	August 20, 2014	Haleakala	Pan-STARRS 1	EOS	1.4 km	MPC · JPL
783200	2014 QJ_{100}	—	August 20, 2014	Haleakala	Pan-STARRS 1	·	1.3 km	MPC · JPL

== 783201–783300 ==
back to top

Designation			Discovery			Properties		Ref
Permanent	Provisional	Named after	Date	Site	Discoverer(s)	Category	Diam.	Ref
783201	2014 QH_{101}	—	September 18, 2010	Kitt Peak	Spacewatch	·	1.1 km	MPC · JPL
783202	2014 QA_{102}	—	August 20, 2014	Haleakala	Pan-STARRS 1	·	1.2 km	MPC · JPL
783203	2014 QB_{102}	—	August 20, 2014	Haleakala	Pan-STARRS 1	·	1.1 km	MPC · JPL
783204	2014 QS_{105}	—	August 20, 2014	Haleakala	Pan-STARRS 1	·	840 m	MPC · JPL
783205	2014 QG_{108}	—	October 29, 2010	Mount Lemmon	Mount Lemmon Survey	·	1.2 km	MPC · JPL
783206	2014 QK_{109}	—	July 1, 2014	Haleakala	Pan-STARRS 1	·	1.0 km	MPC · JPL
783207	2014 QY_{112}	—	August 20, 2014	Haleakala	Pan-STARRS 1	·	1.2 km	MPC · JPL
783208	2014 QJ_{116}	—	January 30, 2004	Kitt Peak	Spacewatch	JUN	900 m	MPC · JPL
783209	2014 QZ_{117}	—	September 19, 2010	Kitt Peak	Spacewatch	·	1.0 km	MPC · JPL
783210	2014 QU_{119}	—	November 14, 2010	Kitt Peak	Spacewatch	·	1.4 km	MPC · JPL
783211	2014 QZ_{121}	—	July 28, 2014	Haleakala	Pan-STARRS 1	·	1.2 km	MPC · JPL
783212	2014 QT_{123}	—	November 26, 2010	Mount Lemmon	Mount Lemmon Survey	·	1.1 km	MPC · JPL
783213	2014 QR_{124}	—	August 3, 2014	Haleakala	Pan-STARRS 1	·	860 m	MPC · JPL
783214	2014 QN_{128}	—	November 17, 2006	Mount Lemmon	Mount Lemmon Survey	·	1.0 km	MPC · JPL
783215	2014 QU_{128}	—	October 29, 2010	Westfield	International Astronomical Search Collaboration	·	1.1 km	MPC · JPL
783216	2014 QE_{130}	—	October 21, 2006	Mount Lemmon	Mount Lemmon Survey	·	1.0 km	MPC · JPL
783217	2014 QK_{130}	—	February 27, 2012	Haleakala	Pan-STARRS 1	·	2.2 km	MPC · JPL
783218	2014 QQ_{131}	—	August 20, 2014	Haleakala	Pan-STARRS 1	·	2.1 km	MPC · JPL
783219	2014 QL_{135}	—	August 5, 2014	Haleakala	Pan-STARRS 1	·	1.2 km	MPC · JPL
783220	2014 QN_{136}	—	February 10, 2008	Kitt Peak	Spacewatch	·	1.1 km	MPC · JPL
783221	2014 QF_{137}	—	September 25, 1995	Kitt Peak	Spacewatch	KOR	1.1 km	MPC · JPL
783222	2014 QK_{137}	—	September 29, 2010	Mount Lemmon	Mount Lemmon Survey	·	830 m	MPC · JPL
783223	2014 QS_{138}	—	November 8, 2007	Kitt Peak	Spacewatch	3:2	3.4 km	MPC · JPL
783224	2014 QM_{139}	—	August 20, 2014	Haleakala	Pan-STARRS 1	·	2.0 km	MPC · JPL
783225	2014 QE_{141}	—	August 5, 2014	Haleakala	Pan-STARRS 1	EUN	870 m	MPC · JPL
783226	2014 QD_{142}	—	March 8, 2013	Haleakala	Pan-STARRS 1	·	860 m	MPC · JPL
783227	2014 QZ_{148}	—	November 6, 2005	Mount Lemmon	Mount Lemmon Survey	KOR	990 m	MPC · JPL
783228	2014 QD_{149}	—	August 20, 2014	Haleakala	Pan-STARRS 1	·	1.3 km	MPC · JPL
783229	2014 QP_{150}	—	August 20, 2014	Haleakala	Pan-STARRS 1	·	2.1 km	MPC · JPL
783230	2014 QJ_{159}	—	August 22, 2014	Haleakala	Pan-STARRS 1	·	1.3 km	MPC · JPL
783231	2014 QK_{163}	—	September 21, 2009	Mount Lemmon	Mount Lemmon Survey	·	2.4 km	MPC · JPL
783232	2014 QF_{167}	—	August 22, 2014	Haleakala	Pan-STARRS 1	·	990 m	MPC · JPL
783233	2014 QH_{171}	—	August 24, 2001	Kitt Peak	Spacewatch	(17392)	1.1 km	MPC · JPL
783234	2014 QN_{176}	—	August 20, 2014	Haleakala	Pan-STARRS 1	·	1.5 km	MPC · JPL
783235	2014 QL_{180}	—	June 4, 2014	Haleakala	Pan-STARRS 1	(5)	970 m	MPC · JPL
783236	2014 QC_{183}	—	August 13, 2010	Kitt Peak	Spacewatch	·	940 m	MPC · JPL
783237	2014 QO_{187}	—	August 22, 2014	Haleakala	Pan-STARRS 1	·	1.4 km	MPC · JPL
783238	2014 QT_{187}	—	July 10, 2010	WISE	WISE	·	1.3 km	MPC · JPL
783239	2014 QA_{190}	—	July 30, 2014	Kitt Peak	Spacewatch	·	1.4 km	MPC · JPL
783240	2014 QZ_{191}	—	April 15, 2013	Haleakala	Pan-STARRS 1	·	1.4 km	MPC · JPL
783241	2014 QH_{194}	—	November 13, 2010	Mount Lemmon	Mount Lemmon Survey	·	1.3 km	MPC · JPL
783242	2014 QP_{195}	—	February 1, 2012	Mount Lemmon	Mount Lemmon Survey	EUN	840 m	MPC · JPL
783243	2014 QC_{196}	—	January 10, 2006	Kitt Peak	Spacewatch	EOS	1.5 km	MPC · JPL
783244	2014 QQ_{197}	—	August 22, 2014	Haleakala	Pan-STARRS 1	·	1.4 km	MPC · JPL
783245	2014 QH_{199}	—	August 22, 2014	Haleakala	Pan-STARRS 1	·	1.4 km	MPC · JPL
783246	2014 QS_{201}	—	October 27, 2006	Mount Lemmon	Mount Lemmon Survey	·	820 m	MPC · JPL
783247	2014 QD_{202}	—	October 26, 2009	Mount Lemmon	Mount Lemmon Survey	VER	2.1 km	MPC · JPL
783248	2014 QB_{204}	—	August 22, 2014	Haleakala	Pan-STARRS 1	·	1.3 km	MPC · JPL
783249	2014 QZ_{209}	—	August 22, 2014	Haleakala	Pan-STARRS 1	·	1.8 km	MPC · JPL
783250	2014 QV_{210}	—	August 22, 2014	Haleakala	Pan-STARRS 1	·	860 m	MPC · JPL
783251	2014 QO_{211}	—	August 22, 2014	Haleakala	Pan-STARRS 1	AST	1.1 km	MPC · JPL
783252	2014 QY_{212}	—	October 11, 2010	Kitt Peak	Spacewatch	·	1.1 km	MPC · JPL
783253	2014 QH_{213}	—	September 30, 2010	Mount Lemmon	Mount Lemmon Survey	·	1.0 km	MPC · JPL
783254	2014 QO_{214}	—	February 10, 2008	Kitt Peak	Spacewatch	HNS	660 m	MPC · JPL
783255	2014 QH_{215}	—	August 22, 2014	Haleakala	Pan-STARRS 1	·	1.3 km	MPC · JPL
783256	2014 QJ_{215}	—	October 12, 2010	Mount Lemmon	Mount Lemmon Survey	·	1.2 km	MPC · JPL
783257	2014 QG_{216}	—	November 10, 2010	Mount Lemmon	Mount Lemmon Survey	HOF	1.9 km	MPC · JPL
783258	2014 QM_{219}	—	May 5, 2013	Mount Lemmon	Mount Lemmon Survey	·	1.3 km	MPC · JPL
783259	2014 QP_{222}	—	August 22, 2014	Haleakala	Pan-STARRS 1	·	1.2 km	MPC · JPL
783260	2014 QQ_{222}	—	August 22, 2014	Haleakala	Pan-STARRS 1	GEF	870 m	MPC · JPL
783261	2014 QB_{224}	—	September 25, 2009	Kitt Peak	Spacewatch	·	1.9 km	MPC · JPL
783262	2014 QN_{225}	—	July 28, 2014	Haleakala	Pan-STARRS 1	·	1.4 km	MPC · JPL
783263	2014 QP_{234}	—	August 22, 2014	Haleakala	Pan-STARRS 1	(116763)	1.3 km	MPC · JPL
783264	2014 QX_{235}	—	June 30, 2008	Kitt Peak	Spacewatch	THM	1.9 km	MPC · JPL
783265	2014 QV_{237}	—	April 6, 2013	Mount Lemmon	Mount Lemmon Survey	·	1.2 km	MPC · JPL
783266	2014 QW_{240}	—	August 22, 2014	Haleakala	Pan-STARRS 1	·	1.3 km	MPC · JPL
783267	2014 QZ_{242}	—	October 25, 2005	Kitt Peak	Spacewatch	·	1.2 km	MPC · JPL
783268	2014 QR_{243}	—	August 22, 2014	Haleakala	Pan-STARRS 1	·	1.9 km	MPC · JPL
783269	2014 QC_{246}	—	August 22, 2014	Haleakala	Pan-STARRS 1	DOR	1.8 km	MPC · JPL
783270	2014 QK_{248}	—	July 7, 2014	Haleakala	Pan-STARRS 1	·	1.0 km	MPC · JPL
783271	2014 QP_{251}	—	April 14, 2008	Kitt Peak	Spacewatch	·	1.6 km	MPC · JPL
783272	2014 QT_{256}	—	August 22, 2014	Haleakala	Pan-STARRS 1	TRE	1.7 km	MPC · JPL
783273	2014 QY_{256}	—	August 22, 2014	Haleakala	Pan-STARRS 1	·	970 m	MPC · JPL
783274	2014 QC_{260}	—	October 20, 2001	Socorro	LINEAR	·	1.3 km	MPC · JPL
783275	2014 QX_{260}	—	August 22, 2014	Haleakala	Pan-STARRS 1	EOS	1.5 km	MPC · JPL
783276	2014 QT_{261}	—	August 22, 2014	Haleakala	Pan-STARRS 1	EOS	1.4 km	MPC · JPL
783277	2014 QD_{266}	—	August 18, 2014	Haleakala	Pan-STARRS 1	·	1.2 km	MPC · JPL
783278	2014 QV_{268}	—	August 10, 2010	Kitt Peak	Spacewatch	MAR	780 m	MPC · JPL
783279	2014 QA_{274}	—	August 22, 2014	Haleakala	Pan-STARRS 1	·	1.2 km	MPC · JPL
783280	2014 QR_{274}	—	August 23, 2014	Haleakala	Pan-STARRS 1	·	1.3 km	MPC · JPL
783281	2014 QG_{280}	—	July 25, 2014	Haleakala	Pan-STARRS 1	T_{j} (2.98) · 3:2 · (6124)	3.7 km	MPC · JPL
783282	2014 QB_{281}	—	July 28, 2014	Haleakala	Pan-STARRS 1	·	1.1 km	MPC · JPL
783283	2014 QZ_{281}	—	January 19, 2007	Mauna Kea	P. A. Wiegert	KOR	970 m	MPC · JPL
783284	2014 QX_{284}	—	March 14, 2013	Palomar	Palomar Transient Factory	EUN	970 m	MPC · JPL
783285	2014 QM_{285}	—	April 22, 2013	Mount Lemmon	Mount Lemmon Survey	·	1.5 km	MPC · JPL
783286	2014 QO_{294}	—	August 5, 2014	Haleakala	Pan-STARRS 1	·	1.5 km	MPC · JPL
783287	2014 QE_{299}	—	July 25, 2014	Haleakala	Pan-STARRS 1	·	1.2 km	MPC · JPL
783288	2014 QK_{299}	—	August 3, 2014	Haleakala	Pan-STARRS 1	·	1.4 km	MPC · JPL
783289	2014 QL_{314}	—	July 28, 2014	Haleakala	Pan-STARRS 1	·	2.1 km	MPC · JPL
783290	2014 QX_{315}	—	July 25, 2014	Haleakala	Pan-STARRS 1	·	1.1 km	MPC · JPL
783291	2014 QP_{319}	—	July 25, 2014	Haleakala	Pan-STARRS 1	(5)	790 m	MPC · JPL
783292	2014 QC_{320}	—	October 9, 2010	Kitt Peak	Spacewatch	·	1.0 km	MPC · JPL
783293	2014 QP_{321}	—	August 25, 2014	Haleakala	Pan-STARRS 1	·	1.2 km	MPC · JPL
783294	2014 QA_{332}	—	August 25, 2014	Haleakala	Pan-STARRS 1	·	1.4 km	MPC · JPL
783295	2014 QE_{333}	—	August 25, 2014	Haleakala	Pan-STARRS 1	·	1.3 km	MPC · JPL
783296	2014 QA_{336}	—	September 30, 2005	Mount Lemmon	Mount Lemmon Survey	·	1.3 km	MPC · JPL
783297	2014 QK_{336}	—	September 20, 2001	Anderson Mesa	LONEOS	·	1.6 km	MPC · JPL
783298	2014 QV_{345}	—	July 4, 2014	Haleakala	Pan-STARRS 1	·	1.6 km	MPC · JPL
783299	2014 QG_{347}	—	August 26, 2014	Haleakala	Pan-STARRS 1	EUN	860 m	MPC · JPL
783300	2014 QU_{349}	—	August 27, 2014	Haleakala	Pan-STARRS 1	KOR	1.0 km	MPC · JPL

== 783301–783400 ==
back to top

Designation			Discovery			Properties		Ref
Permanent	Provisional	Named after	Date	Site	Discoverer(s)	Category	Diam.	Ref
783301	2014 QA_{352}	—	July 29, 2014	Haleakala	Pan-STARRS 1	·	1.5 km	MPC · JPL
783302	2014 QH_{360}	—	August 27, 2014	Haleakala	Pan-STARRS 1	·	820 m	MPC · JPL
783303	2014 QC_{368}	—	March 25, 2012	Mount Lemmon	Mount Lemmon Survey	HNS	810 m	MPC · JPL
783304	2014 QV_{368}	—	May 1, 2013	Mount Lemmon	Mount Lemmon Survey	BRG	1.1 km	MPC · JPL
783305	2014 QC_{370}	—	April 4, 2013	Haleakala	Pan-STARRS 1	·	1.3 km	MPC · JPL
783306	2014 QK_{373}	—	May 4, 2009	Mount Lemmon	Mount Lemmon Survey	·	1.1 km	MPC · JPL
783307	2014 QG_{377}	—	August 27, 2014	Haleakala	Pan-STARRS 1	·	1.1 km	MPC · JPL
783308	2014 QQ_{377}	—	July 29, 2014	Haleakala	Pan-STARRS 1	AGN	980 m	MPC · JPL
783309	2014 QR_{379}	—	July 27, 2014	Haleakala	Pan-STARRS 1	·	2.2 km	MPC · JPL
783310	2014 QF_{380}	—	July 30, 2014	Haleakala	Pan-STARRS 1	·	1.4 km	MPC · JPL
783311	2014 QP_{388}	—	October 23, 2009	Mount Lemmon	Mount Lemmon Survey	·	2.0 km	MPC · JPL
783312	2014 QQ_{397}	—	November 30, 2005	Kitt Peak	Spacewatch	KOR	930 m	MPC · JPL
783313	2014 QM_{398}	—	September 7, 2008	Mount Lemmon	Mount Lemmon Survey	·	2.3 km	MPC · JPL
783314	2014 QQ_{398}	—	August 29, 2005	Kitt Peak	Spacewatch	·	1.2 km	MPC · JPL
783315	2014 QM_{412}	—	August 30, 2014	Mount Lemmon	Mount Lemmon Survey	·	1.3 km	MPC · JPL
783316	2014 QF_{422}	—	February 15, 2012	Haleakala	Pan-STARRS 1	·	1.1 km	MPC · JPL
783317	2014 QH_{426}	—	August 22, 2014	Haleakala	Pan-STARRS 1	·	740 m	MPC · JPL
783318	2014 QM_{430}	—	September 17, 2010	Mount Lemmon	Mount Lemmon Survey	·	840 m	MPC · JPL
783319	2014 QA_{431}	—	August 31, 2014	Mount Lemmon	Mount Lemmon Survey	·	1.3 km	MPC · JPL
783320	2014 QJ_{436}	—	August 6, 2014	Haleakala	Pan-STARRS 1	·	830 m	MPC · JPL
783321	2014 QC_{437}	—	June 15, 2010	Mount Lemmon	Mount Lemmon Survey	·	1.1 km	MPC · JPL
783322	2014 QN_{439}	—	October 24, 2019	Mount Lemmon	Mount Lemmon Survey	·	1.0 km	MPC · JPL
783323	2014 QQ_{451}	—	August 20, 2014	Haleakala	Pan-STARRS 1	·	1.0 km	MPC · JPL
783324	2014 QM_{453}	—	August 21, 2014	Oukaïmeden	C. Rinner	·	1.9 km	MPC · JPL
783325	2014 QF_{455}	—	October 17, 2010	Mount Lemmon	Mount Lemmon Survey	NEM	1.8 km	MPC · JPL
783326	2014 QE_{456}	—	August 31, 2014	Haleakala	Pan-STARRS 1	·	1.1 km	MPC · JPL
783327	2014 QK_{457}	—	September 28, 2003	Kitt Peak	Spacewatch	·	2.4 km	MPC · JPL
783328	2014 QX_{458}	—	October 12, 2010	Mount Lemmon	Mount Lemmon Survey	WIT	650 m	MPC · JPL
783329	2014 QB_{459}	—	August 19, 2014	Haleakala	Pan-STARRS 1	·	1.3 km	MPC · JPL
783330	2014 QH_{459}	—	August 20, 2014	Haleakala	Pan-STARRS 1	HOF	1.9 km	MPC · JPL
783331	2014 QJ_{460}	—	April 12, 2013	Haleakala	Pan-STARRS 1	·	1.2 km	MPC · JPL
783332	2014 QL_{460}	—	August 20, 2014	Haleakala	Pan-STARRS 1	·	1.2 km	MPC · JPL
783333	2014 QT_{460}	—	October 12, 2010	Kitt Peak	Spacewatch	·	1.0 km	MPC · JPL
783334	2014 QM_{463}	—	August 22, 2014	Haleakala	Pan-STARRS 1	·	1.3 km	MPC · JPL
783335	2014 QP_{463}	—	August 22, 2014	Haleakala	Pan-STARRS 1	·	1.1 km	MPC · JPL
783336	2014 QN_{464}	—	November 16, 2009	Mount Lemmon	Mount Lemmon Survey	·	2.1 km	MPC · JPL
783337	2014 QL_{465}	—	August 23, 2014	Haleakala	Pan-STARRS 1	·	2.2 km	MPC · JPL
783338	2014 QC_{467}	—	February 8, 2011	Mount Lemmon	Mount Lemmon Survey	·	2.0 km	MPC · JPL
783339	2014 QD_{467}	—	August 25, 2014	Haleakala	Pan-STARRS 1	·	1.5 km	MPC · JPL
783340	2014 QJ_{467}	—	August 26, 2014	Haleakala	Pan-STARRS 1	EUN	880 m	MPC · JPL
783341	2014 QC_{468}	—	August 27, 2014	Haleakala	Pan-STARRS 1	·	1.4 km	MPC · JPL
783342	2014 QM_{468}	—	August 27, 2014	Haleakala	Pan-STARRS 1	KOR	1.1 km	MPC · JPL
783343	2014 QX_{468}	—	March 13, 2012	Mount Lemmon	Mount Lemmon Survey	·	1.5 km	MPC · JPL
783344	2014 QK_{469}	—	October 13, 2010	Mount Lemmon	Mount Lemmon Survey	·	1.4 km	MPC · JPL
783345	2014 QD_{470}	—	August 28, 2014	Haleakala	Pan-STARRS 1	·	1.5 km	MPC · JPL
783346	2014 QR_{470}	—	January 12, 2011	Kitt Peak	Spacewatch	EOS	1.4 km	MPC · JPL
783347	2014 QT_{470}	—	August 28, 2014	Haleakala	Pan-STARRS 1	·	1.6 km	MPC · JPL
783348	2014 QN_{471}	—	August 30, 2014	Kitt Peak	Spacewatch	AGN	840 m	MPC · JPL
783349	2014 QO_{471}	—	January 19, 2012	Mount Lemmon	Mount Lemmon Survey	EUN	1.1 km	MPC · JPL
783350	2014 QR_{471}	—	August 30, 2014	Haleakala	Pan-STARRS 1	AEO	1.0 km	MPC · JPL
783351	2014 QX_{472}	—	August 31, 2014	Haleakala	Pan-STARRS 1	ADE	1.2 km	MPC · JPL
783352	2014 QU_{475}	—	July 1, 2014	Haleakala	Pan-STARRS 1	·	1.2 km	MPC · JPL
783353	2014 QP_{477}	—	July 25, 2014	Haleakala	Pan-STARRS 1	·	1.1 km	MPC · JPL
783354	2014 QU_{477}	—	August 20, 2014	Haleakala	Pan-STARRS 1	·	1.2 km	MPC · JPL
783355	2014 QG_{480}	—	August 20, 2014	Haleakala	Pan-STARRS 1	·	1.1 km	MPC · JPL
783356	2014 QQ_{481}	—	August 20, 2014	Haleakala	Pan-STARRS 1	KOR	1.0 km	MPC · JPL
783357	2014 QC_{482}	—	February 19, 2009	Mount Lemmon	Mount Lemmon Survey	·	970 m	MPC · JPL
783358	2014 QY_{482}	—	August 20, 2014	Haleakala	Pan-STARRS 1	·	1.1 km	MPC · JPL
783359	2014 QK_{485}	—	August 20, 2014	Haleakala	Pan-STARRS 1	·	1.3 km	MPC · JPL
783360	2014 QE_{489}	—	August 22, 2014	Haleakala	Pan-STARRS 1	·	1.4 km	MPC · JPL
783361	2014 QY_{494}	—	August 31, 2014	Catalina	CSS	·	1.4 km	MPC · JPL
783362	2014 QG_{495}	—	August 25, 2014	Haleakala	Pan-STARRS 1	·	1.2 km	MPC · JPL
783363	2014 QK_{500}	—	August 28, 2014	Haleakala	Pan-STARRS 1	·	1.3 km	MPC · JPL
783364	2014 QP_{504}	—	August 31, 2014	Haleakala	Pan-STARRS 1	·	2.0 km	MPC · JPL
783365	2014 QE_{505}	—	August 28, 2014	Haleakala	Pan-STARRS 1	·	1.3 km	MPC · JPL
783366	2014 QN_{507}	—	August 25, 2014	Haleakala	Pan-STARRS 1	·	1.2 km	MPC · JPL
783367	2014 QA_{508}	—	August 22, 2014	Haleakala	Pan-STARRS 1	·	1 km	MPC · JPL
783368	2014 QA_{510}	—	August 26, 2014	Haleakala	Pan-STARRS 1	·	1.3 km	MPC · JPL
783369	2014 QM_{512}	—	March 4, 2017	Haleakala	Pan-STARRS 1	·	1.7 km	MPC · JPL
783370	2014 QA_{515}	—	January 1, 2016	Haleakala	Pan-STARRS 1	HNS	860 m	MPC · JPL
783371	2014 QJ_{515}	—	August 28, 2014	Haleakala	Pan-STARRS 1	·	1.2 km	MPC · JPL
783372	2014 QR_{518}	—	August 27, 2014	Haleakala	Pan-STARRS 1	KOR	960 m	MPC · JPL
783373	2014 QT_{518}	—	August 28, 2014	Haleakala	Pan-STARRS 1	·	1.5 km	MPC · JPL
783374	2014 QS_{519}	—	August 23, 2014	Haleakala	Pan-STARRS 1	·	1.2 km	MPC · JPL
783375	2014 QB_{520}	—	August 20, 2014	Haleakala	Pan-STARRS 1	·	1.0 km	MPC · JPL
783376	2014 QT_{520}	—	August 25, 2014	Haleakala	Pan-STARRS 1	·	1.7 km	MPC · JPL
783377	2014 QE_{522}	—	August 25, 2014	Haleakala	Pan-STARRS 1	WIT	750 m	MPC · JPL
783378	2014 QG_{522}	—	August 31, 2014	Haleakala	Pan-STARRS 1	·	2.2 km	MPC · JPL
783379	2014 QL_{523}	—	August 28, 2014	Haleakala	Pan-STARRS 1	EOS	1.5 km	MPC · JPL
783380	2014 QF_{526}	—	August 25, 2014	Haleakala	Pan-STARRS 1	·	1.2 km	MPC · JPL
783381	2014 QG_{526}	—	August 25, 2014	Haleakala	Pan-STARRS 1	·	1.1 km	MPC · JPL
783382	2014 QX_{526}	—	August 30, 2014	Mount Lemmon	Mount Lemmon Survey	·	1 km	MPC · JPL
783383	2014 QY_{526}	—	August 22, 2014	Haleakala	Pan-STARRS 1	·	1.4 km	MPC · JPL
783384	2014 QM_{527}	—	August 28, 2014	Haleakala	Pan-STARRS 1	EOS	1.2 km	MPC · JPL
783385	2014 QR_{527}	—	August 22, 2014	Haleakala	Pan-STARRS 1	·	1.1 km	MPC · JPL
783386	2014 QJ_{529}	—	August 27, 2014	Haleakala	Pan-STARRS 1	·	1.1 km	MPC · JPL
783387	2014 QC_{530}	—	August 27, 2014	Haleakala	Pan-STARRS 1	·	890 m	MPC · JPL
783388	2014 QE_{534}	—	August 28, 2014	Haleakala	Pan-STARRS 1	EOS	1.6 km	MPC · JPL
783389	2014 QV_{534}	—	August 27, 2014	Haleakala	Pan-STARRS 1	·	1.1 km	MPC · JPL
783390	2014 QX_{534}	—	August 28, 2014	Haleakala	Pan-STARRS 1	·	1.2 km	MPC · JPL
783391	2014 QD_{535}	—	August 23, 2014	Haleakala	Pan-STARRS 1	·	1.3 km	MPC · JPL
783392	2014 QT_{536}	—	August 27, 2014	Haleakala	Pan-STARRS 1	(5)	730 m	MPC · JPL
783393	2014 QW_{537}	—	November 14, 1998	Kitt Peak	Spacewatch	·	2.0 km	MPC · JPL
783394	2014 QU_{539}	—	August 30, 2014	Haleakala	Pan-STARRS 1	·	2.1 km	MPC · JPL
783395	2014 QO_{545}	—	August 25, 2014	Calar Alto-CASADO	Mottola, S., Hellmich, S.	·	1.1 km	MPC · JPL
783396	2014 QJ_{546}	—	August 20, 2014	Haleakala	Pan-STARRS 1	EOS	1.5 km	MPC · JPL
783397	2014 QG_{547}	—	August 22, 2014	Haleakala	Pan-STARRS 1	EOS	1.5 km	MPC · JPL
783398	2014 QW_{547}	—	September 17, 2010	Mount Lemmon	Mount Lemmon Survey	·	870 m	MPC · JPL
783399	2014 QB_{548}	—	August 20, 2014	Haleakala	Pan-STARRS 1	·	1.0 km	MPC · JPL
783400	2014 QU_{550}	—	August 23, 2014	Haleakala	Pan-STARRS 1	·	1.3 km	MPC · JPL

== 783401–783500 ==
back to top

Designation			Discovery			Properties		Ref
Permanent	Provisional	Named after	Date	Site	Discoverer(s)	Category	Diam.	Ref
783401	2014 QV_{550}	—	August 30, 2014	Mount Lemmon	Mount Lemmon Survey	·	2.0 km	MPC · JPL
783402	2014 QE_{551}	—	August 27, 2014	Haleakala	Pan-STARRS 1	·	1.2 km	MPC · JPL
783403	2014 QG_{554}	—	August 25, 2014	Haleakala	Pan-STARRS 1	PAD	1.2 km	MPC · JPL
783404	2014 QW_{554}	—	August 22, 2014	Haleakala	Pan-STARRS 1	·	2.3 km	MPC · JPL
783405	2014 QC_{555}	—	August 23, 2014	Haleakala	Pan-STARRS 1	·	1.2 km	MPC · JPL
783406	2014 QK_{557}	—	August 22, 2014	Haleakala	Pan-STARRS 1	·	1 km	MPC · JPL
783407	2014 QC_{564}	—	August 28, 2014	Haleakala	Pan-STARRS 1	·	1.7 km	MPC · JPL
783408	2014 QY_{564}	—	August 25, 2014	Haleakala	Pan-STARRS 1	·	1.1 km	MPC · JPL
783409	2014 QV_{569}	—	August 25, 2014	Haleakala	Pan-STARRS 1	·	1.2 km	MPC · JPL
783410	2014 QW_{569}	—	August 23, 2014	Haleakala	Pan-STARRS 1	·	1.4 km	MPC · JPL
783411	2014 QX_{569}	—	August 25, 2014	Haleakala	Pan-STARRS 1	·	1.5 km	MPC · JPL
783412	2014 QN_{571}	—	August 23, 2014	Haleakala	Pan-STARRS 1	·	990 m	MPC · JPL
783413	2014 QJ_{574}	—	August 28, 2014	Haleakala	Pan-STARRS 1	·	1.2 km	MPC · JPL
783414	2014 QX_{574}	—	August 31, 2014	Haleakala	Pan-STARRS 1	·	1.4 km	MPC · JPL
783415	2014 QJ_{579}	—	August 22, 2014	Haleakala	Pan-STARRS 1	·	1.7 km	MPC · JPL
783416	2014 QK_{580}	—	August 30, 2014	Mount Lemmon	Mount Lemmon Survey	·	1.1 km	MPC · JPL
783417	2014 QO_{583}	—	August 19, 2014	Haleakala	Pan-STARRS 1	·	1.4 km	MPC · JPL
783418	2014 QE_{584}	—	August 27, 2014	Haleakala	Pan-STARRS 1	·	1.2 km	MPC · JPL
783419	2014 QG_{584}	—	March 5, 2008	Kitt Peak	Spacewatch	·	1.3 km	MPC · JPL
783420	2014 QG_{590}	—	August 25, 2014	Haleakala	Pan-STARRS 1	·	1.5 km	MPC · JPL
783421	2014 QL_{590}	—	June 22, 2009	Kitt Peak	Spacewatch	·	1.6 km	MPC · JPL
783422	2014 QC_{596}	—	August 27, 2014	Haleakala	Pan-STARRS 1	·	1.2 km	MPC · JPL
783423	2014 QP_{596}	—	August 27, 2014	Haleakala	Pan-STARRS 1	·	1.2 km	MPC · JPL
783424	2014 QJ_{598}	—	August 28, 2014	Haleakala	Pan-STARRS 1	HOF	1.8 km	MPC · JPL
783425	2014 QJ_{613}	—	August 27, 2014	Haleakala	Pan-STARRS 1	·	1.6 km	MPC · JPL
783426	2014 QM_{614}	—	August 20, 2014	Haleakala	Pan-STARRS 1	·	1.3 km	MPC · JPL
783427	2014 RO_{2}	—	July 30, 2014	Kitt Peak	Spacewatch	·	1.2 km	MPC · JPL
783428	2014 RY_{3}	—	July 8, 2014	Haleakala	Pan-STARRS 1	·	960 m	MPC · JPL
783429	2014 RN_{10}	—	September 2, 2014	Haleakala	Pan-STARRS 1	·	1.2 km	MPC · JPL
783430	2014 RA_{11}	—	September 29, 2005	Mount Lemmon	Mount Lemmon Survey	·	1.3 km	MPC · JPL
783431	2014 RC_{15}	—	August 6, 2014	Haleakala	Pan-STARRS 1	MAR	750 m	MPC · JPL
783432	2014 RE_{24}	—	November 10, 2010	Mount Lemmon	Mount Lemmon Survey	·	1.3 km	MPC · JPL
783433	2014 RZ_{24}	—	August 27, 2001	Kitt Peak	Spacewatch	·	1.1 km	MPC · JPL
783434	2014 RP_{28}	—	August 22, 2014	Haleakala	Pan-STARRS 1	EUN	900 m	MPC · JPL
783435	2014 RB_{30}	—	October 1, 2005	Mount Lemmon	Mount Lemmon Survey	·	1.1 km	MPC · JPL
783436	2014 RH_{33}	—	September 19, 2006	Kitt Peak	Spacewatch	·	1.0 km	MPC · JPL
783437	2014 RV_{36}	—	March 23, 2012	Mount Lemmon	Mount Lemmon Survey	EOS	1.5 km	MPC · JPL
783438	2014 RR_{47}	—	September 14, 2014	Mount Lemmon	Mount Lemmon Survey	(29841)	1.1 km	MPC · JPL
783439	2014 RD_{56}	—	November 14, 2010	Kitt Peak	Spacewatch	·	1.2 km	MPC · JPL
783440	2014 RK_{56}	—	September 3, 2014	Kitt Peak	Spacewatch	ADE	1.6 km	MPC · JPL
783441	2014 RE_{58}	—	September 15, 2014	Mount Lemmon	Mount Lemmon Survey	·	1.1 km	MPC · JPL
783442	2014 RM_{59}	—	September 15, 2014	Mount Lemmon	Mount Lemmon Survey	·	1.0 km	MPC · JPL
783443	2014 RN_{59}	—	August 27, 2014	Haleakala	Pan-STARRS 1	·	1.3 km	MPC · JPL
783444	2014 RB_{64}	—	October 7, 2007	Mount Lemmon	Mount Lemmon Survey	3:2	3.3 km	MPC · JPL
783445	2014 RH_{65}	—	September 14, 2014	Mount Lemmon	Mount Lemmon Survey	EOS	1.3 km	MPC · JPL
783446	2014 RK_{65}	—	September 1, 2014	Mount Lemmon	Mount Lemmon Survey	HNS	700 m	MPC · JPL
783447	2014 RA_{66}	—	September 15, 2014	Mount Lemmon	Mount Lemmon Survey	·	1.1 km	MPC · JPL
783448	2014 RM_{67}	—	September 2, 2014	Haleakala	Pan-STARRS 1	·	1.8 km	MPC · JPL
783449	2014 RR_{67}	—	September 2, 2014	Haleakala	Pan-STARRS 1	·	1.4 km	MPC · JPL
783450	2014 RJ_{69}	—	September 12, 2014	Kitt Peak	Spacewatch	·	1.2 km	MPC · JPL
783451	2014 RP_{69}	—	August 25, 2014	Haleakala	Pan-STARRS 1	·	1.6 km	MPC · JPL
783452	2014 RC_{73}	—	September 4, 2014	Haleakala	Pan-STARRS 1	MAR	790 m	MPC · JPL
783453	2014 RU_{76}	—	September 2, 2014	Haleakala	Pan-STARRS 1	·	1.1 km	MPC · JPL
783454	2014 RB_{77}	—	September 4, 2014	Haleakala	Pan-STARRS 1	·	1.4 km	MPC · JPL
783455	2014 RO_{77}	—	September 2, 2014	Haleakala	Pan-STARRS 1	·	1.0 km	MPC · JPL
783456	2014 RV_{77}	—	August 30, 2014	Kitt Peak	Spacewatch	·	1.3 km	MPC · JPL
783457	2014 RU_{80}	—	September 1, 2014	Mount Lemmon	Mount Lemmon Survey	·	1.6 km	MPC · JPL
783458	2014 RE_{83}	—	September 15, 2014	Mount Lemmon	Mount Lemmon Survey	·	1.9 km	MPC · JPL
783459	2014 RT_{83}	—	September 2, 2014	Haleakala	Pan-STARRS 1	·	1.3 km	MPC · JPL
783460	2014 RU_{84}	—	September 2, 2014	Haleakala	Pan-STARRS 1	·	1.1 km	MPC · JPL
783461	2014 RD_{85}	—	September 4, 2014	Haleakala	Pan-STARRS 1	·	1.4 km	MPC · JPL
783462	2014 RF_{86}	—	September 2, 2014	Haleakala	Pan-STARRS 1	·	1.2 km	MPC · JPL
783463	2014 RL_{88}	—	September 2, 2014	Haleakala	Pan-STARRS 1	·	1.5 km	MPC · JPL
783464	2014 RY_{91}	—	September 3, 2014	Mount Lemmon	Mount Lemmon Survey	·	2.2 km	MPC · JPL
783465	2014 SL_{4}	—	August 28, 2014	Haleakala	Pan-STARRS 1	·	1.5 km	MPC · JPL
783466	2014 SY_{9}	—	September 17, 2014	Haleakala	Pan-STARRS 1	·	890 m	MPC · JPL
783467	2014 SE_{11}	—	September 18, 2010	Mount Lemmon	Mount Lemmon Survey	·	1.2 km	MPC · JPL
783468	2014 SH_{11}	—	November 3, 2010	Mount Lemmon	Mount Lemmon Survey	·	1.1 km	MPC · JPL
783469	2014 SH_{12}	—	August 31, 2014	Mount Lemmon	Mount Lemmon Survey	·	1.3 km	MPC · JPL
783470	2014 SB_{17}	—	August 22, 2014	Haleakala	Pan-STARRS 1	·	1.2 km	MPC · JPL
783471	2014 SZ_{17}	—	September 17, 2014	Haleakala	Pan-STARRS 1	·	1.3 km	MPC · JPL
783472	2014 SE_{19}	—	August 27, 2014	Haleakala	Pan-STARRS 1	·	770 m	MPC · JPL
783473	2014 SO_{19}	—	October 13, 2010	Mount Lemmon	Mount Lemmon Survey	·	1.0 km	MPC · JPL
783474	2014 SV_{20}	—	September 17, 2014	Haleakala	Pan-STARRS 1	·	1.8 km	MPC · JPL
783475	2014 SP_{22}	—	September 17, 2014	Haleakala	Pan-STARRS 1	·	1.0 km	MPC · JPL
783476	2014 SJ_{24}	—	August 27, 2014	Haleakala	Pan-STARRS 1	·	1.3 km	MPC · JPL
783477	2014 ST_{24}	—	January 28, 2006	Mount Lemmon	Mount Lemmon Survey	·	1.2 km	MPC · JPL
783478	2014 SH_{29}	—	September 17, 2014	Haleakala	Pan-STARRS 1	(12739)	1.1 km	MPC · JPL
783479	2014 SD_{33}	—	August 23, 2014	Haleakala	Pan-STARRS 1	AEO	710 m	MPC · JPL
783480	2014 ST_{34}	—	September 17, 2014	Haleakala	Pan-STARRS 1	KOR	990 m	MPC · JPL
783481	2014 ST_{36}	—	September 13, 2005	Kitt Peak	Spacewatch	·	1.2 km	MPC · JPL
783482	2014 SY_{36}	—	October 22, 2006	Kitt Peak	Spacewatch	·	710 m	MPC · JPL
783483	2014 SC_{37}	—	September 17, 2014	Haleakala	Pan-STARRS 1	·	1.9 km	MPC · JPL
783484	2014 SD_{38}	—	September 17, 2014	Haleakala	Pan-STARRS 1	SYL	2.5 km	MPC · JPL
783485	2014 SX_{39}	—	September 17, 2014	Haleakala	Pan-STARRS 1	·	1.3 km	MPC · JPL
783486	2014 SC_{44}	—	August 20, 2014	Haleakala	Pan-STARRS 1	·	1.2 km	MPC · JPL
783487	2014 SU_{44}	—	August 28, 2014	Haleakala	Pan-STARRS 1	EOS	1.3 km	MPC · JPL
783488	2014 SK_{48}	—	September 17, 2014	Haleakala	Pan-STARRS 1	·	1.1 km	MPC · JPL
783489	2014 SZ_{53}	—	July 7, 2014	Haleakala	Pan-STARRS 1	T_{j} (2.97) · 3:2	4.4 km	MPC · JPL
783490	2014 SD_{55}	—	May 1, 2013	Mount Lemmon	Mount Lemmon Survey	·	1.3 km	MPC · JPL
783491	2014 SE_{59}	—	September 2, 2014	Haleakala	Pan-STARRS 1	·	1.3 km	MPC · JPL
783492	2014 SW_{59}	—	September 17, 2014	Haleakala	Pan-STARRS 1	·	1.1 km	MPC · JPL
783493	2014 SM_{60}	—	September 17, 2014	Haleakala	Pan-STARRS 1	·	1.4 km	MPC · JPL
783494	2014 SG_{62}	—	July 10, 2005	Siding Spring	SSS	·	1.5 km	MPC · JPL
783495	2014 SG_{64}	—	July 25, 2014	Haleakala	Pan-STARRS 1	·	780 m	MPC · JPL
783496	2014 SG_{69}	—	February 15, 2012	Haleakala	Pan-STARRS 1	·	2.0 km	MPC · JPL
783497	2014 SQ_{70}	—	May 4, 2009	Mount Lemmon	Mount Lemmon Survey	·	990 m	MPC · JPL
783498	2014 SS_{70}	—	August 28, 2014	Haleakala	Pan-STARRS 1	·	1.1 km	MPC · JPL
783499	2014 SB_{71}	—	August 28, 2014	Haleakala	Pan-STARRS 1	·	920 m	MPC · JPL
783500	2014 SL_{76}	—	September 18, 2014	Haleakala	Pan-STARRS 1	·	1.1 km	MPC · JPL

== 783501–783600 ==
back to top

Designation			Discovery			Properties		Ref
Permanent	Provisional	Named after	Date	Site	Discoverer(s)	Category	Diam.	Ref
783501	2014 SL_{82}	—	August 29, 2014	Kitt Peak	Spacewatch	KOR	1.0 km	MPC · JPL
783502	2014 SJ_{83}	—	August 27, 2014	Haleakala	Pan-STARRS 1	·	1.2 km	MPC · JPL
783503	2014 SL_{83}	—	September 18, 2014	Haleakala	Pan-STARRS 1	·	980 m	MPC · JPL
783504	2014 SA_{87}	—	September 18, 2014	Haleakala	Pan-STARRS 1	GEF	680 m	MPC · JPL
783505	2014 SE_{89}	—	February 13, 2011	Mount Lemmon	Mount Lemmon Survey	·	2.2 km	MPC · JPL
783506	2014 SV_{90}	—	September 18, 2014	Haleakala	Pan-STARRS 1	·	1.2 km	MPC · JPL
783507	2014 SV_{94}	—	September 18, 2014	Haleakala	Pan-STARRS 1	JUN	770 m	MPC · JPL
783508	2014 SX_{97}	—	September 18, 2014	Haleakala	Pan-STARRS 1	·	1.3 km	MPC · JPL
783509	2014 SC_{98}	—	March 28, 2012	Mount Lemmon	Mount Lemmon Survey	KOR	980 m	MPC · JPL
783510	2014 SR_{99}	—	September 18, 2014	Haleakala	Pan-STARRS 1	GAL	1.0 km	MPC · JPL
783511	2014 SY_{99}	—	April 13, 2013	Haleakala	Pan-STARRS 1	·	1.1 km	MPC · JPL
783512	2014 SM_{103}	—	August 27, 2014	Haleakala	Pan-STARRS 1	·	1.2 km	MPC · JPL
783513	2014 SM_{105}	—	September 13, 2005	Kitt Peak	Spacewatch	WIT	720 m	MPC · JPL
783514	2014 SQ_{106}	—	August 27, 2014	Haleakala	Pan-STARRS 1	·	1.6 km	MPC · JPL
783515	2014 SV_{106}	—	September 18, 2014	Haleakala	Pan-STARRS 1	AST	1.3 km	MPC · JPL
783516	2014 SL_{112}	—	September 18, 2014	Haleakala	Pan-STARRS 1	·	1.3 km	MPC · JPL
783517	2014 SN_{114}	—	March 23, 2012	Mount Lemmon	Mount Lemmon Survey	·	1.6 km	MPC · JPL
783518	2014 SJ_{115}	—	August 25, 2014	Haleakala	Pan-STARRS 1	·	1.1 km	MPC · JPL
783519	2014 SA_{116}	—	September 18, 2014	Haleakala	Pan-STARRS 1	·	960 m	MPC · JPL
783520	2014 SG_{122}	—	September 18, 2014	Haleakala	Pan-STARRS 1	·	970 m	MPC · JPL
783521	2014 SO_{122}	—	December 3, 2010	Mount Lemmon	Mount Lemmon Survey	·	1.2 km	MPC · JPL
783522	2014 SF_{126}	—	September 18, 2014	Haleakala	Pan-STARRS 1	KOR	950 m	MPC · JPL
783523	2014 SU_{126}	—	September 18, 2014	Haleakala	Pan-STARRS 1	·	1.1 km	MPC · JPL
783524	2014 SV_{126}	—	December 2, 2010	Mount Lemmon	Mount Lemmon Survey	·	1.1 km	MPC · JPL
783525	2014 SY_{130}	—	November 1, 2010	Mount Lemmon	Mount Lemmon Survey	·	810 m	MPC · JPL
783526	2014 SW_{132}	—	August 25, 2014	Haleakala	Pan-STARRS 1	KOR	1.0 km	MPC · JPL
783527	2014 SU_{133}	—	August 25, 2014	Haleakala	Pan-STARRS 1	·	1.2 km	MPC · JPL
783528	2014 SJ_{136}	—	November 3, 2010	Mount Lemmon	Mount Lemmon Survey	·	1.2 km	MPC · JPL
783529	2014 SZ_{138}	—	September 16, 2009	Mount Lemmon	Mount Lemmon Survey	KOR	970 m	MPC · JPL
783530	2014 SJ_{139}	—	October 12, 2010	Mount Lemmon	Mount Lemmon Survey	·	1.1 km	MPC · JPL
783531	2014 SR_{140}	—	August 27, 2014	Haleakala	Pan-STARRS 1	·	1.2 km	MPC · JPL
783532	2014 SZ_{140}	—	May 28, 2014	Haleakala	Pan-STARRS 1	(194)	1.2 km	MPC · JPL
783533	2014 SP_{151}	—	September 19, 2014	Haleakala	Pan-STARRS 1	·	1.2 km	MPC · JPL
783534	2014 SA_{165}	—	March 29, 2008	Kitt Peak	Spacewatch	·	1.3 km	MPC · JPL
783535	2014 SC_{171}	—	August 6, 2014	Haleakala	Pan-STARRS 1	·	1.0 km	MPC · JPL
783536	2014 SS_{173}	—	September 16, 2010	Kitt Peak	Spacewatch	·	810 m	MPC · JPL
783537	2014 SA_{175}	—	August 27, 2014	Haleakala	Pan-STARRS 1	·	2.4 km	MPC · JPL
783538	2014 SS_{175}	—	September 20, 2014	Haleakala	Pan-STARRS 1	·	1.5 km	MPC · JPL
783539	2014 SJ_{179}	—	September 20, 2014	Haleakala	Pan-STARRS 1	KOR	1.1 km	MPC · JPL
783540	2014 SD_{181}	—	August 27, 2014	Haleakala	Pan-STARRS 1	·	1.1 km	MPC · JPL
783541	2014 SS_{181}	—	September 20, 2014	Haleakala	Pan-STARRS 1	·	1.2 km	MPC · JPL
783542	2014 SP_{182}	—	September 20, 2014	Haleakala	Pan-STARRS 1	·	1.3 km	MPC · JPL
783543	2014 SA_{186}	—	March 14, 2007	Mount Lemmon	Mount Lemmon Survey	·	2.4 km	MPC · JPL
783544	2014 SJ_{186}	—	October 17, 2010	Mount Lemmon	Mount Lemmon Survey	·	1.1 km	MPC · JPL
783545	2014 SE_{187}	—	August 27, 2014	Haleakala	Pan-STARRS 1	HNS	780 m	MPC · JPL
783546	2014 SU_{187}	—	September 26, 2003	Apache Point	SDSS	·	2.3 km	MPC · JPL
783547	2014 SC_{188}	—	December 3, 2010	Mount Lemmon	Mount Lemmon Survey	NEM	1.5 km	MPC · JPL
783548	2014 SR_{188}	—	September 20, 2014	Haleakala	Pan-STARRS 1	·	1.3 km	MPC · JPL
783549	2014 SC_{191}	—	September 20, 2014	Haleakala	Pan-STARRS 1	KOR	1.0 km	MPC · JPL
783550	2014 SW_{192}	—	April 14, 2013	ESA OGS	ESA OGS	·	1.1 km	MPC · JPL
783551	2014 SS_{193}	—	August 30, 2014	Haleakala	Pan-STARRS 1	·	1.4 km	MPC · JPL
783552	2014 SA_{194}	—	September 20, 2014	Haleakala	Pan-STARRS 1	·	1.8 km	MPC · JPL
783553	2014 SA_{197}	—	September 20, 2014	Haleakala	Pan-STARRS 1	·	2.1 km	MPC · JPL
783554	2014 SS_{197}	—	September 20, 2014	Haleakala	Pan-STARRS 1	·	1.3 km	MPC · JPL
783555	2014 SJ_{200}	—	November 11, 2010	Mount Lemmon	Mount Lemmon Survey	·	1.2 km	MPC · JPL
783556	2014 SN_{202}	—	November 2, 2010	Mount Lemmon	Mount Lemmon Survey	·	1.3 km	MPC · JPL
783557	2014 SG_{205}	—	September 20, 2014	Haleakala	Pan-STARRS 1	·	1.2 km	MPC · JPL
783558	2014 SP_{205}	—	September 20, 2014	Haleakala	Pan-STARRS 1	·	1.4 km	MPC · JPL
783559	2014 SV_{205}	—	September 20, 2014	Haleakala	Pan-STARRS 1	KOR	1.1 km	MPC · JPL
783560 Beldea	2014 SY_{205}	Beldea	February 27, 2012	Roque de los Muchachos	EURONEAR	·	1.3 km	MPC · JPL
783561	2014 SL_{224}	—	August 22, 2014	Haleakala	Pan-STARRS 1	EOS	1.3 km	MPC · JPL
783562	2014 SZ_{225}	—	August 27, 2014	Haleakala	Pan-STARRS 1	WIT	720 m	MPC · JPL
783563	2014 SM_{226}	—	August 20, 2014	Haleakala	Pan-STARRS 1	·	1.7 km	MPC · JPL
783564	2014 SR_{236}	—	September 18, 2010	Mount Lemmon	Mount Lemmon Survey	·	1.0 km	MPC · JPL
783565	2014 SR_{244}	—	August 27, 2014	Haleakala	Pan-STARRS 1	·	1.2 km	MPC · JPL
783566	2014 SF_{247}	—	September 22, 2014	Haleakala	Pan-STARRS 1	EOS	1.4 km	MPC · JPL
783567	2014 SD_{250}	—	February 19, 2009	Kitt Peak	Spacewatch	·	1.5 km	MPC · JPL
783568	2014 SH_{250}	—	September 16, 2009	Kitt Peak	Spacewatch	·	1.3 km	MPC · JPL
783569	2014 SS_{253}	—	August 25, 2004	Kitt Peak	Spacewatch	·	1.4 km	MPC · JPL
783570	2014 SO_{254}	—	October 30, 2010	Kitt Peak	Spacewatch	·	1.3 km	MPC · JPL
783571	2014 SP_{254}	—	September 23, 2014	Mount Lemmon	Mount Lemmon Survey	·	1.4 km	MPC · JPL
783572	2014 ST_{255}	—	September 23, 2014	Mount Lemmon	Mount Lemmon Survey	·	1.4 km	MPC · JPL
783573	2014 SU_{264}	—	December 2, 2010	Mount Lemmon	Mount Lemmon Survey	·	1.1 km	MPC · JPL
783574	2014 SA_{266}	—	September 13, 2014	Haleakala	Pan-STARRS 1	·	1.3 km	MPC · JPL
783575	2014 SK_{272}	—	March 1, 2008	Kitt Peak	Spacewatch	·	1.3 km	MPC · JPL
783576	2014 SU_{273}	—	February 16, 2012	Haleakala	Pan-STARRS 1	·	930 m	MPC · JPL
783577	2014 SB_{276}	—	February 11, 2011	Mount Lemmon	Mount Lemmon Survey	EOS	1.3 km	MPC · JPL
783578	2014 SO_{276}	—	March 13, 2012	Mount Lemmon	Mount Lemmon Survey	·	3.0 km	MPC · JPL
783579	2014 SK_{277}	—	September 20, 2014	Haleakala	Pan-STARRS 1	·	1.0 km	MPC · JPL
783580	2014 SS_{284}	—	August 31, 2014	Kitt Peak	Spacewatch	MAR	800 m	MPC · JPL
783581	2014 SO_{291}	—	May 16, 2013	Mount Lemmon	Mount Lemmon Survey	HYG	1.9 km	MPC · JPL
783582	2014 SX_{291}	—	November 1, 2010	Mount Lemmon	Mount Lemmon Survey	·	1.2 km	MPC · JPL
783583	2014 SE_{295}	—	September 25, 2014	Mount Lemmon	Mount Lemmon Survey	EUN	1.0 km	MPC · JPL
783584	2014 SD_{297}	—	February 12, 2008	Mount Lemmon	Mount Lemmon Survey	·	1.1 km	MPC · JPL
783585	2014 SV_{302}	—	November 13, 2010	Mount Lemmon	Mount Lemmon Survey	·	1.3 km	MPC · JPL
783586	2014 SU_{308}	—	September 24, 2014	Mount Lemmon	Mount Lemmon Survey	·	1.5 km	MPC · JPL
783587	2014 SN_{311}	—	November 6, 2010	Kitt Peak	Spacewatch	·	1.3 km	MPC · JPL
783588	2014 SN_{317}	—	August 28, 2005	Kitt Peak	Spacewatch	·	1.1 km	MPC · JPL
783589	2014 SK_{321}	—	September 18, 2014	Haleakala	Pan-STARRS 1	·	2.5 km	MPC · JPL
783590	2014 SK_{323}	—	September 6, 2014	Mount Lemmon	Mount Lemmon Survey	·	1.2 km	MPC · JPL
783591	2014 SP_{324}	—	August 27, 2014	Haleakala	Pan-STARRS 1	EOS	1.4 km	MPC · JPL
783592	2014 SD_{325}	—	February 11, 2011	Mount Lemmon	Mount Lemmon Survey	VER	1.9 km	MPC · JPL
783593	2014 SY_{331}	—	September 29, 2014	Haleakala	Pan-STARRS 1	·	1.2 km	MPC · JPL
783594	2014 SE_{333}	—	September 19, 2014	Haleakala	Pan-STARRS 1	·	1.8 km	MPC · JPL
783595	2014 SH_{336}	—	August 30, 2014	Haleakala	Pan-STARRS 1	·	2.2 km	MPC · JPL
783596	2014 SC_{341}	—	September 19, 2014	Haleakala	Pan-STARRS 1	MRX	760 m	MPC · JPL
783597	2014 SE_{341}	—	December 2, 2010	Mount Lemmon	Mount Lemmon Survey	·	1.3 km	MPC · JPL
783598	2014 SQ_{342}	—	August 25, 2014	Haleakala	Pan-STARRS 1	HNS	880 m	MPC · JPL
783599	2014 SM_{343}	—	September 22, 2014	Kitt Peak	Spacewatch	·	1.4 km	MPC · JPL
783600	2014 SQ_{343}	—	August 25, 2014	Haleakala	Pan-STARRS 1	·	1.6 km	MPC · JPL

== 783601–783700 ==
back to top

Designation			Discovery			Properties		Ref
Permanent	Provisional	Named after	Date	Site	Discoverer(s)	Category	Diam.	Ref
783601	2014 SP_{353}	—	August 27, 2005	Kitt Peak	Spacewatch	·	1.3 km	MPC · JPL
783602	2014 SA_{356}	—	December 2, 2005	Mauna Kea	A. Boattini	EOS	1.4 km	MPC · JPL
783603	2014 SB_{357}	—	September 18, 2014	Haleakala	Pan-STARRS 1	KOR	1.1 km	MPC · JPL
783604	2014 SF_{358}	—	September 19, 2014	Haleakala	Pan-STARRS 1	·	1.4 km	MPC · JPL
783605	2014 SJ_{358}	—	March 29, 2012	Mount Lemmon	Mount Lemmon Survey	HOF	2.1 km	MPC · JPL
783606	2014 SK_{358}	—	September 19, 2014	Haleakala	Pan-STARRS 1	EOS	1.4 km	MPC · JPL
783607	2014 SM_{358}	—	September 19, 2014	Haleakala	Pan-STARRS 1	·	1.4 km	MPC · JPL
783608	2014 SV_{358}	—	September 19, 2014	Haleakala	Pan-STARRS 1	·	2.2 km	MPC · JPL
783609	2014 SY_{358}	—	September 19, 2014	Haleakala	Pan-STARRS 1	·	2.3 km	MPC · JPL
783610	2014 SK_{359}	—	September 19, 2014	Haleakala	Pan-STARRS 1	·	3.1 km	MPC · JPL
783611	2014 SM_{359}	—	October 13, 2010	Mount Lemmon	Mount Lemmon Survey	EUN	990 m	MPC · JPL
783612	2014 SY_{359}	—	November 13, 2010	Kitt Peak	Spacewatch	·	1.2 km	MPC · JPL
783613	2014 SL_{360}	—	September 19, 2014	Haleakala	Pan-STARRS 1	·	1.4 km	MPC · JPL
783614	2014 SN_{360}	—	October 12, 2005	Kitt Peak	Spacewatch	AEO	700 m	MPC · JPL
783615	2014 SU_{360}	—	September 20, 2014	Haleakala	Pan-STARRS 1	EOS	1.4 km	MPC · JPL
783616	2014 SF_{362}	—	September 24, 2014	Mount Lemmon	Mount Lemmon Survey	HNS	1.0 km	MPC · JPL
783617	2014 SJ_{362}	—	September 24, 2014	Haleakala	Pan-STARRS 1	·	1.6 km	MPC · JPL
783618	2014 SS_{362}	—	September 25, 2014	Kitt Peak	Spacewatch	·	1.3 km	MPC · JPL
783619	2014 SY_{362}	—	November 19, 2003	Kitt Peak	Spacewatch	·	2.1 km	MPC · JPL
783620	2014 ST_{364}	—	September 24, 2014	Mount Lemmon	Mount Lemmon Survey	·	1.1 km	MPC · JPL
783621	2014 SS_{366}	—	September 19, 2014	Haleakala	Pan-STARRS 1	VER	2.0 km	MPC · JPL
783622	2014 SY_{367}	—	September 18, 2014	Haleakala	Pan-STARRS 1	EUN	880 m	MPC · JPL
783623	2014 SR_{369}	—	September 20, 2014	Catalina	CSS	DOR	1.8 km	MPC · JPL
783624	2014 SO_{374}	—	September 20, 2014	Haleakala	Pan-STARRS 1	·	1.6 km	MPC · JPL
783625	2014 SA_{377}	—	December 13, 2015	Haleakala	Pan-STARRS 1	·	1.3 km	MPC · JPL
783626	2014 SZ_{377}	—	May 8, 2013	Haleakala	Pan-STARRS 1	·	1.3 km	MPC · JPL
783627	2014 SL_{378}	—	September 18, 2014	Haleakala	Pan-STARRS 1	·	1.3 km	MPC · JPL
783628	2014 SQ_{378}	—	September 20, 2014	Haleakala	Pan-STARRS 1	·	1.2 km	MPC · JPL
783629	2014 SG_{379}	—	September 25, 2014	Kitt Peak	Spacewatch	·	1.0 km	MPC · JPL
783630	2014 SL_{379}	—	September 19, 2014	Haleakala	Pan-STARRS 1	·	1.3 km	MPC · JPL
783631	2014 SP_{379}	—	September 20, 2014	Haleakala	Pan-STARRS 1	HNS	770 m	MPC · JPL
783632	2014 SG_{380}	—	September 21, 2014	ESA OGS	ESA OGS	WIT	680 m	MPC · JPL
783633	2014 SO_{380}	—	September 24, 2014	Kitt Peak	Spacewatch	·	1.1 km	MPC · JPL
783634	2014 ST_{380}	—	September 19, 2014	Haleakala	Pan-STARRS 1	KOR	940 m	MPC · JPL
783635	2014 SX_{380}	—	September 23, 2014	Mount Lemmon	Mount Lemmon Survey	·	1.3 km	MPC · JPL
783636	2014 SL_{381}	—	September 19, 2014	Haleakala	Pan-STARRS 1	·	1.2 km	MPC · JPL
783637	2014 SA_{382}	—	September 17, 2014	Haleakala	Pan-STARRS 1	·	1.2 km	MPC · JPL
783638	2014 SH_{382}	—	September 19, 2014	Haleakala	Pan-STARRS 1	KOR	1 km	MPC · JPL
783639	2014 SN_{382}	—	December 6, 2010	Mount Lemmon	Mount Lemmon Survey	·	1.2 km	MPC · JPL
783640	2014 SC_{383}	—	September 19, 2014	Haleakala	Pan-STARRS 1	·	1.4 km	MPC · JPL
783641	2014 SG_{383}	—	September 26, 2014	Kitt Peak	Spacewatch	·	1.2 km	MPC · JPL
783642	2014 SS_{384}	—	September 20, 2014	Haleakala	Pan-STARRS 1	HNS	900 m	MPC · JPL
783643	2014 SV_{385}	—	September 23, 2014	Mount Lemmon	Mount Lemmon Survey	EOS	1.4 km	MPC · JPL
783644	2014 SO_{387}	—	September 24, 2014	Mount Lemmon	Mount Lemmon Survey	MAR	780 m	MPC · JPL
783645	2014 SN_{388}	—	September 18, 2014	Haleakala	Pan-STARRS 1	·	1.2 km	MPC · JPL
783646	2014 SS_{388}	—	September 18, 2014	Haleakala	Pan-STARRS 1	MRX	730 m	MPC · JPL
783647	2014 SN_{389}	—	September 19, 2014	Haleakala	Pan-STARRS 1	·	1.4 km	MPC · JPL
783648	2014 SU_{394}	—	September 19, 2014	Haleakala	Pan-STARRS 1	·	1.0 km	MPC · JPL
783649	2014 SC_{395}	—	September 19, 2014	Haleakala	Pan-STARRS 1	HNS	700 m	MPC · JPL
783650	2014 SH_{395}	—	September 23, 2014	Mount Lemmon	Mount Lemmon Survey	HNS	750 m	MPC · JPL
783651	2014 SL_{395}	—	September 22, 2014	Haleakala	Pan-STARRS 1	·	1.4 km	MPC · JPL
783652	2014 SP_{395}	—	August 27, 2014	Haleakala	Pan-STARRS 1	·	840 m	MPC · JPL
783653	2014 SQ_{395}	—	September 22, 2014	Mount Teide	A. Knöfel	·	1.3 km	MPC · JPL
783654	2014 SD_{396}	—	September 18, 2014	Haleakala	Pan-STARRS 1	·	1.1 km	MPC · JPL
783655	2014 SL_{396}	—	September 18, 2014	Haleakala	Pan-STARRS 1	T_{j} (2.99) · 3:2	4.0 km	MPC · JPL
783656	2014 SC_{397}	—	September 20, 2014	Haleakala	Pan-STARRS 1	HNS	860 m	MPC · JPL
783657	2014 SD_{397}	—	September 24, 2014	Mount Lemmon	Mount Lemmon Survey	·	1.5 km	MPC · JPL
783658	2014 SG_{398}	—	September 19, 2014	Haleakala	Pan-STARRS 1	·	1.2 km	MPC · JPL
783659	2014 SU_{399}	—	September 18, 2014	Haleakala	Pan-STARRS 1	·	1.2 km	MPC · JPL
783660	2014 SY_{399}	—	September 18, 2014	Haleakala	Pan-STARRS 1	·	1.4 km	MPC · JPL
783661	2014 SC_{400}	—	September 19, 2014	Haleakala	Pan-STARRS 1	·	1.4 km	MPC · JPL
783662	2014 SL_{400}	—	September 18, 2014	Haleakala	Pan-STARRS 1	·	1.1 km	MPC · JPL
783663	2014 SR_{407}	—	September 23, 2014	Mount Lemmon	Mount Lemmon Survey	·	1.2 km	MPC · JPL
783664	2014 SS_{407}	—	September 17, 2014	Haleakala	Pan-STARRS 1	MAR	850 m	MPC · JPL
783665	2014 SU_{410}	—	September 17, 2014	Haleakala	Pan-STARRS 1	·	1.4 km	MPC · JPL
783666	2014 SK_{411}	—	September 24, 2014	Mount Lemmon	Mount Lemmon Survey	EOS	1.2 km	MPC · JPL
783667	2014 SV_{411}	—	September 24, 2014	Mount Lemmon	Mount Lemmon Survey	·	1.3 km	MPC · JPL
783668	2014 SB_{412}	—	September 29, 2014	Haleakala	Pan-STARRS 1	·	1.2 km	MPC · JPL
783669	2014 SR_{412}	—	September 17, 2014	Haleakala	Pan-STARRS 1	KOR	1.0 km	MPC · JPL
783670	2014 ST_{412}	—	September 17, 2014	Haleakala	Pan-STARRS 1	·	1.3 km	MPC · JPL
783671	2014 SP_{418}	—	September 25, 2014	Kitt Peak	Spacewatch	·	1.4 km	MPC · JPL
783672	2014 SJ_{420}	—	September 29, 2014	Haleakala	Pan-STARRS 1	NEM	1.6 km	MPC · JPL
783673	2014 SV_{420}	—	September 23, 2014	Mount Lemmon	Mount Lemmon Survey	·	1.1 km	MPC · JPL
783674	2014 SY_{421}	—	September 19, 2014	Haleakala	Pan-STARRS 1	·	1.2 km	MPC · JPL
783675	2014 TK_{4}	—	September 19, 2014	Haleakala	Pan-STARRS 1	·	2.5 km	MPC · JPL
783676	2014 TH_{9}	—	September 23, 2014	Mount Lemmon	Mount Lemmon Survey	·	950 m	MPC · JPL
783677	2014 TF_{13}	—	March 24, 2012	Mount Lemmon	Mount Lemmon Survey	·	1.4 km	MPC · JPL
783678	2014 TG_{13}	—	October 1, 2014	Haleakala	Pan-STARRS 1	·	1.4 km	MPC · JPL
783679	2014 TU_{13}	—	October 1, 2014	Haleakala	Pan-STARRS 1	·	2.0 km	MPC · JPL
783680	2014 TJ_{14}	—	October 1, 2014	Haleakala	Pan-STARRS 1	·	1.3 km	MPC · JPL
783681	2014 TN_{15}	—	November 25, 2010	Mount Lemmon	Mount Lemmon Survey	·	1.0 km	MPC · JPL
783682	2014 TY_{24}	—	September 21, 2003	Kitt Peak	Spacewatch	·	1.8 km	MPC · JPL
783683	2014 TA_{32}	—	September 20, 2014	Haleakala	Pan-STARRS 1	KOR	1.0 km	MPC · JPL
783684	2014 TH_{40}	—	September 2, 2014	Haleakala	Pan-STARRS 1	DOR	2.0 km	MPC · JPL
783685	2014 TG_{41}	—	February 11, 2011	Mount Lemmon	Mount Lemmon Survey	EOS	1.3 km	MPC · JPL
783686	2014 TO_{41}	—	September 29, 2014	Haleakala	Pan-STARRS 1	·	2.3 km	MPC · JPL
783687	2014 TG_{43}	—	September 29, 2005	Mount Lemmon	Mount Lemmon Survey	(12739)	1.3 km	MPC · JPL
783688	2014 TC_{46}	—	September 29, 2009	Mount Lemmon	Mount Lemmon Survey	·	1.2 km	MPC · JPL
783689	2014 TG_{46}	—	April 20, 2012	Mount Lemmon	Mount Lemmon Survey	·	2.5 km	MPC · JPL
783690	2014 TL_{51}	—	March 23, 2012	Mount Lemmon	Mount Lemmon Survey	·	1.3 km	MPC · JPL
783691	2014 TA_{53}	—	October 14, 2014	Mount Lemmon	Mount Lemmon Survey	·	1.5 km	MPC · JPL
783692	2014 TW_{56}	—	October 26, 2005	Kitt Peak	Spacewatch	(12739)	1.3 km	MPC · JPL
783693	2014 TR_{58}	—	December 27, 2005	Kitt Peak	Spacewatch	·	1.5 km	MPC · JPL
783694	2014 TW_{59}	—	October 13, 2014	Kitt Peak	Spacewatch	EUN	1.1 km	MPC · JPL
783695	2014 TX_{62}	—	May 8, 2013	Haleakala	Pan-STARRS 1	EUN	1.0 km	MPC · JPL
783696	2014 TC_{64}	—	August 28, 2005	Kitt Peak	Spacewatch	·	1.7 km	MPC · JPL
783697	2014 TO_{64}	—	November 3, 2010	Mount Lemmon	Mount Lemmon Survey	·	1.0 km	MPC · JPL
783698	2014 TA_{68}	—	March 28, 2012	Mount Lemmon	Mount Lemmon Survey	·	1.7 km	MPC · JPL
783699	2014 TN_{78}	—	March 17, 2016	Mount Lemmon	Mount Lemmon Survey	·	860 m	MPC · JPL
783700	2014 TD_{81}	—	October 15, 2014	Kitt Peak	Spacewatch	VER	2.0 km	MPC · JPL

== 783701–783800 ==
back to top

Designation			Discovery			Properties		Ref
Permanent	Provisional	Named after	Date	Site	Discoverer(s)	Category	Diam.	Ref
783701	2014 TF_{81}	—	October 1, 2005	Kitt Peak	Spacewatch	·	1.2 km	MPC · JPL
783702	2014 TD_{82}	—	September 24, 2014	Mount Lemmon	Mount Lemmon Survey	(5)	840 m	MPC · JPL
783703	2014 TO_{87}	—	November 25, 2005	Mount Lemmon	Mount Lemmon Survey	·	1.4 km	MPC · JPL
783704	2014 TC_{88}	—	October 1, 2014	Haleakala	Pan-STARRS 1	·	1.1 km	MPC · JPL
783705	2014 TD_{90}	—	November 11, 2009	Kitt Peak	Spacewatch	·	1.4 km	MPC · JPL
783706	2014 TL_{90}	—	September 30, 2014	Mount Lemmon	Mount Lemmon Survey	HNS	770 m	MPC · JPL
783707	2014 TO_{90}	—	October 1, 2014	Haleakala	Pan-STARRS 1	·	1.3 km	MPC · JPL
783708	2014 TQ_{92}	—	November 3, 2005	Mount Lemmon	Mount Lemmon Survey	DOR	1.9 km	MPC · JPL
783709	2014 TE_{93}	—	October 2, 2014	Haleakala	Pan-STARRS 1	·	1.8 km	MPC · JPL
783710	2014 TK_{94}	—	October 5, 2014	Mount Lemmon	Mount Lemmon Survey	·	1.7 km	MPC · JPL
783711	2014 TA_{95}	—	October 13, 2014	Haleakala	Pan-STARRS 1	·	1.5 km	MPC · JPL
783712	2014 TP_{98}	—	October 14, 2014	Mount Lemmon	Mount Lemmon Survey	·	2.0 km	MPC · JPL
783713	2014 TJ_{102}	—	October 1, 2014	Haleakala	Pan-STARRS 1	AGN	790 m	MPC · JPL
783714	2014 TO_{102}	—	November 22, 2015	Mount Lemmon	Mount Lemmon Survey	HNS	960 m	MPC · JPL
783715	2014 TL_{103}	—	October 2, 2014	Haleakala	Pan-STARRS 1	·	1.3 km	MPC · JPL
783716	2014 TS_{103}	—	October 14, 2014	Mount Lemmon	Mount Lemmon Survey	·	1.4 km	MPC · JPL
783717	2014 TA_{104}	—	October 1, 2014	Haleakala	Pan-STARRS 1	·	2.0 km	MPC · JPL
783718	2014 TZ_{104}	—	October 3, 2014	Mount Lemmon	Mount Lemmon Survey	·	1.4 km	MPC · JPL
783719	2014 TM_{106}	—	October 2, 2014	Kitt Peak	Spacewatch	·	820 m	MPC · JPL
783720	2014 TJ_{107}	—	October 1, 2014	Haleakala	Pan-STARRS 1	·	2.0 km	MPC · JPL
783721	2014 TW_{108}	—	October 1, 2014	Haleakala	Pan-STARRS 1	·	2.4 km	MPC · JPL
783722	2014 TM_{112}	—	October 1, 2014	Haleakala	Pan-STARRS 1	GEF	890 m	MPC · JPL
783723	2014 TA_{113}	—	January 19, 2012	Haleakala	Pan-STARRS 1	MAR	810 m	MPC · JPL
783724	2014 TP_{113}	—	October 2, 2014	Haleakala	Pan-STARRS 1	·	1.3 km	MPC · JPL
783725	2014 TN_{118}	—	October 1, 2014	Mount Lemmon	Mount Lemmon Survey	GEF	840 m	MPC · JPL
783726	2014 TO_{118}	—	October 2, 2014	Haleakala	Pan-STARRS 1	HNS	820 m	MPC · JPL
783727	2014 TH_{121}	—	October 3, 2014	Mount Lemmon	Mount Lemmon Survey	·	1.4 km	MPC · JPL
783728	2014 TL_{121}	—	October 1, 2014	Mount Lemmon	Mount Lemmon Survey	·	1.1 km	MPC · JPL
783729	2014 TW_{122}	—	October 2, 2014	Mount Lemmon	Mount Lemmon Survey	·	1.3 km	MPC · JPL
783730	2014 TQ_{123}	—	October 1, 2014	Haleakala	Pan-STARRS 1	·	1.3 km	MPC · JPL
783731	2014 UU	—	September 19, 2001	Apache Point	SDSS	JUN	810 m	MPC · JPL
783732	2014 UR_{8}	—	October 1, 2014	Kitt Peak	Spacewatch	THM	1.6 km	MPC · JPL
783733	2014 UZ_{13}	—	May 18, 2009	Mount Lemmon	Mount Lemmon Survey	EUN	870 m	MPC · JPL
783734	2014 UY_{21}	—	November 6, 2005	Kitt Peak	Spacewatch	·	1.5 km	MPC · JPL
783735	2014 UT_{22}	—	September 5, 2008	Kitt Peak	Spacewatch	·	1.8 km	MPC · JPL
783736	2014 UM_{26}	—	January 2, 2011	Mount Lemmon	Mount Lemmon Survey	KOR	880 m	MPC · JPL
783737	2014 UW_{26}	—	September 29, 2014	Haleakala	Pan-STARRS 1	·	1.3 km	MPC · JPL
783738	2014 UA_{27}	—	September 29, 2014	Haleakala	Pan-STARRS 1	·	1.3 km	MPC · JPL
783739	2014 UJ_{37}	—	October 18, 2014	Mount Lemmon	Mount Lemmon Survey	·	1.3 km	MPC · JPL
783740	2014 UL_{37}	—	October 18, 2014	Mount Lemmon	Mount Lemmon Survey	(13314)	1.4 km	MPC · JPL
783741	2014 UK_{43}	—	October 3, 2014	Mount Lemmon	Mount Lemmon Survey	·	1.7 km	MPC · JPL
783742	2014 UY_{43}	—	October 21, 2014	Kitt Peak	Spacewatch	(13314)	1.4 km	MPC · JPL
783743	2014 UZ_{44}	—	January 29, 2011	Mount Lemmon	Mount Lemmon Survey	AGN	900 m	MPC · JPL
783744	2014 UC_{49}	—	October 15, 2014	Kitt Peak	Spacewatch	·	1.9 km	MPC · JPL
783745	2014 UJ_{52}	—	September 25, 2014	Kitt Peak	Spacewatch	·	1.6 km	MPC · JPL
783746	2014 UB_{53}	—	May 12, 2012	Mount Lemmon	Mount Lemmon Survey	·	2.8 km	MPC · JPL
783747	2014 UV_{59}	—	March 29, 2012	Kitt Peak	Spacewatch	EOS	1.3 km	MPC · JPL
783748	2014 UW_{64}	—	October 20, 2014	Mount Lemmon	Mount Lemmon Survey	·	1.5 km	MPC · JPL
783749	2014 UR_{70}	—	October 21, 2014	Mount Lemmon	Mount Lemmon Survey	·	1.2 km	MPC · JPL
783750	2014 UY_{70}	—	October 21, 2006	Mount Lemmon	Mount Lemmon Survey	EUN	880 m	MPC · JPL
783751	2014 UN_{71}	—	May 12, 2013	Mount Lemmon	Mount Lemmon Survey	·	970 m	MPC · JPL
783752	2014 UH_{73}	—	October 13, 2014	Mount Lemmon	Mount Lemmon Survey	·	1.7 km	MPC · JPL
783753	2014 UX_{73}	—	October 21, 2014	Mount Lemmon	Mount Lemmon Survey	·	1.2 km	MPC · JPL
783754	2014 UJ_{76}	—	March 23, 2012	Mount Lemmon	Mount Lemmon Survey	·	1.3 km	MPC · JPL
783755	2014 UB_{78}	—	October 21, 2014	Mount Lemmon	Mount Lemmon Survey	NEM	1.3 km	MPC · JPL
783756	2014 UO_{79}	—	October 2, 2014	Kitt Peak	Spacewatch	·	1.5 km	MPC · JPL
783757	2014 UT_{81}	—	October 21, 2014	Mount Lemmon	Mount Lemmon Survey	·	1.3 km	MPC · JPL
783758	2014 UA_{87}	—	December 14, 2010	Mount Lemmon	Mount Lemmon Survey	·	1.3 km	MPC · JPL
783759	2014 UN_{100}	—	October 15, 2014	Kitt Peak	Spacewatch	·	760 m	MPC · JPL
783760	2014 UM_{103}	—	August 31, 2014	Haleakala	Pan-STARRS 1	·	1.6 km	MPC · JPL
783761	2014 UQ_{104}	—	August 27, 2009	Kitt Peak	Spacewatch	AST	1.3 km	MPC · JPL
783762	2014 UE_{105}	—	October 24, 2005	Kitt Peak	Spacewatch	AGN	850 m	MPC · JPL
783763	2014 UV_{109}	—	September 25, 2014	Catalina	CSS	·	1.6 km	MPC · JPL
783764	2014 UH_{111}	—	September 2, 2014	Haleakala	Pan-STARRS 1	·	1.6 km	MPC · JPL
783765	2014 UU_{112}	—	October 1, 2014	Haleakala	Pan-STARRS 1	·	1.4 km	MPC · JPL
783766	2014 UP_{115}	—	November 4, 1991	Kitt Peak	Spacewatch	PHO	630 m	MPC · JPL
783767	2014 UH_{120}	—	October 18, 2003	Kitt Peak	Spacewatch	THM	1.6 km	MPC · JPL
783768	2014 UU_{122}	—	January 23, 2011	Mount Lemmon	Mount Lemmon Survey	·	1.5 km	MPC · JPL
783769	2014 UM_{128}	—	February 16, 2012	Haleakala	Pan-STARRS 1	·	1.4 km	MPC · JPL
783770	2014 UK_{130}	—	October 23, 2014	Mount Lemmon	Mount Lemmon Survey	·	1.3 km	MPC · JPL
783771	2014 UJ_{131}	—	September 25, 2014	Kitt Peak	Spacewatch	·	1.8 km	MPC · JPL
783772	2014 UW_{131}	—	October 23, 2014	Mount Lemmon	Mount Lemmon Survey	EOS	1.4 km	MPC · JPL
783773	2014 UF_{138}	—	October 25, 2014	Kitt Peak	Spacewatch	·	1.2 km	MPC · JPL
783774	2014 UH_{140}	—	October 25, 2014	Kitt Peak	Spacewatch	AGN	970 m	MPC · JPL
783775	2014 UW_{140}	—	October 25, 2014	Kitt Peak	Spacewatch	AGN	750 m	MPC · JPL
783776	2014 UV_{141}	—	November 11, 2010	Kitt Peak	Spacewatch	·	1.0 km	MPC · JPL
783777	2014 UK_{142}	—	October 25, 2014	Kitt Peak	Spacewatch	HOF	1.8 km	MPC · JPL
783778	2014 US_{143}	—	October 25, 2014	Kitt Peak	Spacewatch	·	1.3 km	MPC · JPL
783779	2014 UW_{144}	—	October 25, 2014	Mount Lemmon	Mount Lemmon Survey	KOR	1.0 km	MPC · JPL
783780	2014 UQ_{146}	—	October 25, 2014	Mount Lemmon	Mount Lemmon Survey	·	2.2 km	MPC · JPL
783781	2014 US_{149}	—	October 20, 1995	Kitt Peak	Spacewatch	GEF	840 m	MPC · JPL
783782	2014 UZ_{151}	—	October 25, 2014	Mount Lemmon	Mount Lemmon Survey	HOF	1.9 km	MPC · JPL
783783	2014 UD_{154}	—	October 15, 2014	Mount Lemmon	Mount Lemmon Survey	·	2.1 km	MPC · JPL
783784	2014 UG_{154}	—	October 25, 2014	Mount Lemmon	Mount Lemmon Survey	·	1.2 km	MPC · JPL
783785	2014 UM_{154}	—	October 23, 2014	Kitt Peak	Spacewatch	L5	6.3 km	MPC · JPL
783786	2014 UB_{162}	—	August 27, 2009	Kitt Peak	Spacewatch	AGN	790 m	MPC · JPL
783787	2014 UT_{162}	—	October 25, 2005	Kitt Peak	Spacewatch	NEM	1.8 km	MPC · JPL
783788	2014 UU_{164}	—	March 23, 2012	Mount Lemmon	Mount Lemmon Survey	·	1.2 km	MPC · JPL
783789	2014 UG_{166}	—	October 26, 2014	Mount Lemmon	Mount Lemmon Survey	·	1.3 km	MPC · JPL
783790	2014 UR_{166}	—	October 26, 2014	Mount Lemmon	Mount Lemmon Survey	·	2.3 km	MPC · JPL
783791	2014 UR_{173}	—	December 7, 2005	Kitt Peak	Spacewatch	·	1.4 km	MPC · JPL
783792	2014 UR_{176}	—	August 31, 2014	Haleakala	Pan-STARRS 1	HNS	930 m	MPC · JPL
783793	2014 UA_{177}	—	October 1, 2014	Haleakala	Pan-STARRS 1	DOR	1.6 km	MPC · JPL
783794	2014 UY_{178}	—	September 16, 2009	Kitt Peak	Spacewatch	·	1.3 km	MPC · JPL
783795	2014 UU_{180}	—	October 1, 2014	Haleakala	Pan-STARRS 1	·	1.3 km	MPC · JPL
783796	2014 UU_{192}	—	October 30, 2014	Haleakala	Pan-STARRS 1	AMO	470 m	MPC · JPL
783797	2014 UA_{197}	—	October 25, 2014	Haleakala	Pan-STARRS 1	·	1.2 km	MPC · JPL
783798	2014 UQ_{207}	—	October 2, 2014	Haleakala	Pan-STARRS 1	·	1.3 km	MPC · JPL
783799	2014 UR_{209}	—	October 29, 2014	Calar Alto	S. Mottola, S. Hellmich	·	1.5 km	MPC · JPL
783800	2014 UQ_{212}	—	April 21, 2013	Mount Lemmon	Mount Lemmon Survey	·	1.5 km	MPC · JPL

== 783801–783900 ==
back to top

Designation			Discovery			Properties		Ref
Permanent	Provisional	Named after	Date	Site	Discoverer(s)	Category	Diam.	Ref
783801	2014 UK_{220}	—	October 3, 2014	Mount Lemmon	Mount Lemmon Survey	·	1.8 km	MPC · JPL
783802	2014 UL_{224}	—	April 22, 2007	Mount Lemmon	Mount Lemmon Survey	·	1.9 km	MPC · JPL
783803	2014 UU_{230}	—	October 25, 2014	Mount Lemmon	Mount Lemmon Survey	·	1.4 km	MPC · JPL
783804	2014 UG_{231}	—	October 28, 2014	Haleakala	Pan-STARRS 1	·	2.1 km	MPC · JPL
783805	2014 UR_{231}	—	October 22, 2014	Mount Lemmon	Mount Lemmon Survey	·	1.5 km	MPC · JPL
783806	2014 UG_{235}	—	October 24, 2014	Kitt Peak	Spacewatch	AGN	840 m	MPC · JPL
783807	2014 UC_{236}	—	January 14, 2011	Mount Lemmon	Mount Lemmon Survey	·	1.3 km	MPC · JPL
783808	2014 UG_{236}	—	November 18, 2009	Kitt Peak	Spacewatch	EOS	1.2 km	MPC · JPL
783809	2014 UK_{236}	—	October 25, 2014	Haleakala	Pan-STARRS 1	·	1.3 km	MPC · JPL
783810	2014 UY_{238}	—	February 28, 2012	Haleakala	Pan-STARRS 1	·	1.1 km	MPC · JPL
783811	2014 UA_{244}	—	October 28, 2014	Kitt Peak	Spacewatch	HOF	1.9 km	MPC · JPL
783812	2014 UU_{250}	—	July 9, 2018	Haleakala	Pan-STARRS 1	AGN	920 m	MPC · JPL
783813	2014 UR_{255}	—	October 22, 2014	Mount Lemmon	Mount Lemmon Survey	·	1.9 km	MPC · JPL
783814	2014 UH_{256}	—	October 17, 2014	Mount Lemmon	Mount Lemmon Survey	EOS	1.4 km	MPC · JPL
783815	2014 UV_{257}	—	October 25, 2014	Kitt Peak	Spacewatch	AST	1.3 km	MPC · JPL
783816	2014 UJ_{258}	—	October 26, 2014	Mount Lemmon	Mount Lemmon Survey	·	1.9 km	MPC · JPL
783817	2014 UB_{259}	—	October 13, 2014	Kitt Peak	Spacewatch	DOR	1.8 km	MPC · JPL
783818	2014 UB_{261}	—	October 28, 2014	Haleakala	Pan-STARRS 1	(7744)	1.0 km	MPC · JPL
783819	2014 UM_{262}	—	October 28, 2014	Haleakala	Pan-STARRS 1	·	1.3 km	MPC · JPL
783820	2014 UY_{263}	—	October 28, 2014	Haleakala	Pan-STARRS 1	·	1.5 km	MPC · JPL
783821	2014 UF_{265}	—	October 26, 2014	Mount Lemmon	Mount Lemmon Survey	·	1.5 km	MPC · JPL
783822	2014 UK_{265}	—	October 30, 2014	Mount Lemmon	Mount Lemmon Survey	·	2.1 km	MPC · JPL
783823	2014 UZ_{269}	—	October 17, 2014	Mount Lemmon	Mount Lemmon Survey	WIT	690 m	MPC · JPL
783824	2014 UO_{270}	—	October 28, 2014	Haleakala	Pan-STARRS 1	·	1.5 km	MPC · JPL
783825	2014 UK_{271}	—	October 24, 2014	Kitt Peak	Spacewatch	·	1.1 km	MPC · JPL
783826	2014 US_{272}	—	October 31, 2014	Kitt Peak	Spacewatch	·	1.4 km	MPC · JPL
783827	2014 UO_{273}	—	October 25, 2014	Mount Lemmon	Mount Lemmon Survey	·	1.2 km	MPC · JPL
783828	2014 UE_{275}	—	October 28, 2014	Haleakala	Pan-STARRS 1	3:2	4.3 km	MPC · JPL
783829	2014 UL_{279}	—	October 22, 2014	Catalina	CSS	·	2.6 km	MPC · JPL
783830	2014 UQ_{280}	—	October 25, 2014	Haleakala	Pan-STARRS 1	·	1.1 km	MPC · JPL
783831	2014 UP_{283}	—	October 22, 2014	Mount Lemmon	Mount Lemmon Survey	L5	7.0 km	MPC · JPL
783832	2014 UH_{286}	—	October 25, 2014	Kitt Peak	Spacewatch	(5)	680 m	MPC · JPL
783833	2014 UF_{287}	—	October 28, 2014	Haleakala	Pan-STARRS 1	·	1.3 km	MPC · JPL
783834	2014 UR_{288}	—	October 20, 2014	Mount Lemmon	Mount Lemmon Survey	PAD	1.1 km	MPC · JPL
783835	2014 VD	—	November 1, 2014	Mount Lemmon	Mount Lemmon Survey	·	1.6 km	MPC · JPL
783836	2014 VC_{3}	—	October 1, 2014	Haleakala	Pan-STARRS 1	·	1.1 km	MPC · JPL
783837	2014 VC_{8}	—	November 12, 2014	Haleakala	Pan-STARRS 1	·	2.3 km	MPC · JPL
783838	2014 VE_{20}	—	December 30, 2005	Kitt Peak	Spacewatch	·	1.3 km	MPC · JPL
783839 Vasilechirila	2014 VY_{21}	Vasilechirila	September 2, 2014	Roque de los Muchachos	EURONEAR	MRX	760 m	MPC · JPL
783840	2014 VC_{28}	—	September 29, 2008	Mount Lemmon	Mount Lemmon Survey	·	2.3 km	MPC · JPL
783841	2014 VN_{29}	—	September 21, 2009	Kitt Peak	Spacewatch	DOR	1.5 km	MPC · JPL
783842	2014 VN_{34}	—	November 15, 2014	Mount Lemmon	Mount Lemmon Survey	·	1.2 km	MPC · JPL
783843	2014 VU_{36}	—	January 8, 2011	Mount Lemmon	Mount Lemmon Survey	·	1.5 km	MPC · JPL
783844	2014 VJ_{39}	—	March 12, 2011	Mount Lemmon	Mount Lemmon Survey	·	1.6 km	MPC · JPL
783845	2014 VO_{39}	—	November 14, 2014	Kitt Peak	Spacewatch	·	1.3 km	MPC · JPL
783846	2014 VC_{40}	—	November 3, 2014	Mount Lemmon	Mount Lemmon Survey	·	1.3 km	MPC · JPL
783847	2014 WK_{2}	—	June 18, 2013	Haleakala	Pan-STARRS 1	·	1.3 km	MPC · JPL
783848	2014 WU_{3}	—	October 1, 2005	Kitt Peak	Spacewatch	·	1.0 km	MPC · JPL
783849	2014 WD_{8}	—	October 28, 2005	Kitt Peak	Spacewatch	PAD	1.3 km	MPC · JPL
783850	2014 WO_{10}	—	September 18, 2009	Mount Lemmon	Mount Lemmon Survey	·	1.4 km	MPC · JPL
783851	2014 WM_{12}	—	July 13, 2013	Haleakala	Pan-STARRS 1	HOF	1.9 km	MPC · JPL
783852	2014 WR_{13}	—	October 1, 2005	Mount Lemmon	Mount Lemmon Survey	·	1.1 km	MPC · JPL
783853	2014 WS_{15}	—	October 22, 2009	Mount Lemmon	Mount Lemmon Survey	KOR	860 m	MPC · JPL
783854	2014 WJ_{17}	—	October 22, 2014	Kitt Peak	Spacewatch	(5)	920 m	MPC · JPL
783855	2014 WK_{17}	—	November 16, 2014	Mount Lemmon	Mount Lemmon Survey	(13314)	1.4 km	MPC · JPL
783856	2014 WV_{19}	—	October 27, 2005	Kitt Peak	Spacewatch	·	1.3 km	MPC · JPL
783857	2014 WU_{26}	—	October 22, 2014	Mount Lemmon	Mount Lemmon Survey	·	1.2 km	MPC · JPL
783858	2014 WQ_{27}	—	November 17, 2014	Mount Lemmon	Mount Lemmon Survey	L5	6.9 km	MPC · JPL
783859	2014 WR_{29}	—	November 17, 2014	Mount Lemmon	Mount Lemmon Survey	HOF	1.8 km	MPC · JPL
783860	2014 WO_{31}	—	November 17, 2014	Haleakala	Pan-STARRS 1	·	2.0 km	MPC · JPL
783861	2014 WJ_{34}	—	April 12, 2012	Haleakala	Pan-STARRS 1	·	1.2 km	MPC · JPL
783862	2014 WW_{36}	—	November 17, 2014	Haleakala	Pan-STARRS 1	·	1.4 km	MPC · JPL
783863	2014 WA_{37}	—	November 17, 2014	Haleakala	Pan-STARRS 1	HOF	1.6 km	MPC · JPL
783864	2014 WB_{42}	—	September 26, 2009	Mount Lemmon	Mount Lemmon Survey	(13314)	1.3 km	MPC · JPL
783865	2014 WN_{44}	—	November 8, 2009	Kitt Peak	Spacewatch	·	1.4 km	MPC · JPL
783866	2014 WG_{51}	—	October 29, 2014	Kitt Peak	Spacewatch	KOR	970 m	MPC · JPL
783867	2014 WO_{53}	—	November 17, 2014	Haleakala	Pan-STARRS 1	EOS	1.5 km	MPC · JPL
783868	2014 WY_{57}	—	November 17, 2014	Mount Lemmon	Mount Lemmon Survey	KOR	980 m	MPC · JPL
783869	2014 WK_{58}	—	January 16, 2011	Mount Lemmon	Mount Lemmon Survey	PAD	1.1 km	MPC · JPL
783870	2014 WR_{73}	—	August 15, 2009	Kitt Peak	Spacewatch	·	1.4 km	MPC · JPL
783871	2014 WW_{75}	—	November 17, 2014	Mount Lemmon	Mount Lemmon Survey	·	1.3 km	MPC · JPL
783872	2014 WN_{77}	—	October 20, 2008	Mount Lemmon	Mount Lemmon Survey	VER	1.8 km	MPC · JPL
783873	2014 WJ_{78}	—	November 17, 2014	Mount Lemmon	Mount Lemmon Survey	·	1.1 km	MPC · JPL
783874	2014 WN_{78}	—	November 16, 2014	Mount Lemmon	Mount Lemmon Survey	·	2.2 km	MPC · JPL
783875	2014 WG_{79}	—	January 5, 2006	Kitt Peak	Spacewatch	·	1.1 km	MPC · JPL
783876	2014 WU_{79}	—	November 25, 2009	Kitt Peak	Spacewatch	·	1.3 km	MPC · JPL
783877	2014 WE_{82}	—	November 17, 2014	Mount Lemmon	Mount Lemmon Survey	EOS	1.2 km	MPC · JPL
783878	2014 WE_{85}	—	February 8, 2011	Mount Lemmon	Mount Lemmon Survey	·	1.2 km	MPC · JPL
783879	2014 WS_{89}	—	October 25, 2014	Kitt Peak	Spacewatch	·	1.0 km	MPC · JPL
783880	2014 WU_{91}	—	September 21, 2009	Mount Lemmon	Mount Lemmon Survey	·	1.4 km	MPC · JPL
783881	2014 WS_{92}	—	January 31, 2006	Kitt Peak	Spacewatch	·	950 m	MPC · JPL
783882	2014 WC_{93}	—	December 1, 2005	Kitt Peak	Wasserman, L. H., Millis, R. L.	·	1.2 km	MPC · JPL
783883	2014 WW_{93}	—	November 17, 2014	Mount Lemmon	Mount Lemmon Survey	WIT	650 m	MPC · JPL
783884	2014 WG_{94}	—	September 19, 2009	Mount Lemmon	Mount Lemmon Survey	·	1.1 km	MPC · JPL
783885	2014 WL_{95}	—	November 17, 2014	Mount Lemmon	Mount Lemmon Survey	·	1.3 km	MPC · JPL
783886	2014 WL_{97}	—	November 17, 2014	Mount Lemmon	Mount Lemmon Survey	·	1.2 km	MPC · JPL
783887	2014 WP_{97}	—	November 17, 2014	Mount Lemmon	Mount Lemmon Survey	·	1.6 km	MPC · JPL
783888	2014 WS_{97}	—	November 17, 2014	Mount Lemmon	Mount Lemmon Survey	KON	1.5 km	MPC · JPL
783889	2014 WG_{99}	—	November 17, 2014	Mount Lemmon	Mount Lemmon Survey	AGN	870 m	MPC · JPL
783890	2014 WO_{100}	—	September 20, 2014	Haleakala	Pan-STARRS 1	·	1.9 km	MPC · JPL
783891	2014 WU_{104}	—	September 27, 2006	Kitt Peak	Spacewatch	3:2	4.6 km	MPC · JPL
783892	2014 WL_{105}	—	October 2, 2014	Haleakala	Pan-STARRS 1	·	1.5 km	MPC · JPL
783893	2014 WF_{108}	—	October 14, 2014	Kitt Peak	Spacewatch	·	2.4 km	MPC · JPL
783894	2014 WN_{108}	—	February 7, 2011	Mount Lemmon	Mount Lemmon Survey	(13314)	1.4 km	MPC · JPL
783895	2014 WC_{110}	—	September 2, 2008	Kitt Peak	Spacewatch	·	1.9 km	MPC · JPL
783896	2014 WD_{113}	—	September 2, 2014	Haleakala	Pan-STARRS 1	·	1.3 km	MPC · JPL
783897	2014 WX_{113}	—	September 3, 2014	Catalina	CSS	·	1.1 km	MPC · JPL
783898	2014 WE_{122}	—	November 16, 2014	Kitt Peak	Spacewatch	·	1.4 km	MPC · JPL
783899	2014 WW_{123}	—	November 16, 2014	Mount Lemmon	Mount Lemmon Survey	·	1.2 km	MPC · JPL
783900	2014 WF_{124}	—	November 16, 2014	Mount Lemmon	Mount Lemmon Survey	·	1.6 km	MPC · JPL

== 783901–784000 ==
back to top

Designation			Discovery			Properties		Ref
Permanent	Provisional	Named after	Date	Site	Discoverer(s)	Category	Diam.	Ref
783901	2014 WO_{125}	—	September 16, 2009	Kitt Peak	Spacewatch	AGN	790 m	MPC · JPL
783902	2014 WU_{127}	—	November 16, 2014	Calar Alto	Calar Alto	·	1.4 km	MPC · JPL
783903	2014 WT_{133}	—	May 20, 2006	Kitt Peak	Spacewatch	·	2.3 km	MPC · JPL
783904	2014 WW_{133}	—	April 15, 2012	Haleakala	Pan-STARRS 1	·	1.4 km	MPC · JPL
783905	2014 WQ_{134}	—	November 17, 2014	Haleakala	Pan-STARRS 1	·	1.0 km	MPC · JPL
783906	2014 WA_{138}	—	November 17, 2014	Haleakala	Pan-STARRS 1	·	1.2 km	MPC · JPL
783907	2014 WH_{138}	—	November 17, 2014	Haleakala	Pan-STARRS 1	EOS	1.2 km	MPC · JPL
783908	2014 WJ_{142}	—	August 4, 2013	Haleakala	Pan-STARRS 1	·	1.4 km	MPC · JPL
783909	2014 WA_{146}	—	October 18, 2009	Mount Lemmon	Mount Lemmon Survey	·	1.1 km	MPC · JPL
783910	2014 WR_{148}	—	October 14, 2014	Kitt Peak	Spacewatch	·	1.5 km	MPC · JPL
783911	2014 WN_{152}	—	December 25, 2010	Kitt Peak	Spacewatch	·	790 m	MPC · JPL
783912	2014 WP_{153}	—	October 1, 2005	Kitt Peak	Spacewatch	·	1.3 km	MPC · JPL
783913	2014 WR_{154}	—	November 17, 2014	Haleakala	Pan-STARRS 1	·	1.3 km	MPC · JPL
783914	2014 WT_{157}	—	November 17, 2014	Haleakala	Pan-STARRS 1	·	1.4 km	MPC · JPL
783915	2014 WB_{158}	—	October 28, 2014	Haleakala	Pan-STARRS 1	HOF	1.9 km	MPC · JPL
783916	2014 WE_{158}	—	March 6, 2011	Kitt Peak	Spacewatch	EOS	1.4 km	MPC · JPL
783917	2014 WK_{160}	—	September 4, 2014	Haleakala	Pan-STARRS 1	·	2.3 km	MPC · JPL
783918	2014 WD_{164}	—	November 23, 2009	Mount Lemmon	Mount Lemmon Survey	·	1.7 km	MPC · JPL
783919	2014 WS_{169}	—	September 27, 2008	Mount Lemmon	Mount Lemmon Survey	·	2.5 km	MPC · JPL
783920	2014 WV_{170}	—	November 20, 2014	Mount Lemmon	Mount Lemmon Survey	·	1.9 km	MPC · JPL
783921	2014 WW_{174}	—	November 26, 2010	Mount Lemmon	Mount Lemmon Survey	·	1.3 km	MPC · JPL
783922	2014 WB_{178}	—	October 25, 2014	Mount Lemmon	Mount Lemmon Survey	·	1.5 km	MPC · JPL
783923	2014 WV_{178}	—	November 20, 2014	Mount Lemmon	Mount Lemmon Survey	·	1.6 km	MPC · JPL
783924	2014 WQ_{186}	—	August 31, 2014	Haleakala	Pan-STARRS 1	ADE	1.5 km	MPC · JPL
783925	2014 WZ_{187}	—	November 20, 2014	Haleakala	Pan-STARRS 1	·	1.2 km	MPC · JPL
783926	2014 WZ_{188}	—	November 5, 2005	Mount Lemmon	Mount Lemmon Survey	·	1.1 km	MPC · JPL
783927	2014 WP_{189}	—	November 20, 2014	Haleakala	Pan-STARRS 1	·	1.2 km	MPC · JPL
783928	2014 WT_{193}	—	November 21, 2014	Mount Lemmon	Mount Lemmon Survey	DOR	1.7 km	MPC · JPL
783929	2014 WM_{195}	—	November 21, 2014	Mount Lemmon	Mount Lemmon Survey	·	1.3 km	MPC · JPL
783930	2014 WW_{203}	—	March 30, 2012	Mount Lemmon	Mount Lemmon Survey	·	1.3 km	MPC · JPL
783931	2014 WG_{206}	—	October 21, 2014	Mount Lemmon	Mount Lemmon Survey	·	1.2 km	MPC · JPL
783932	2014 WU_{212}	—	September 27, 2009	Mount Lemmon	Mount Lemmon Survey	AGN	780 m	MPC · JPL
783933	2014 WW_{213}	—	October 25, 2014	Mount Lemmon	Mount Lemmon Survey	·	1.2 km	MPC · JPL
783934	2014 WR_{217}	—	November 18, 2014	Haleakala	Pan-STARRS 1	·	1.3 km	MPC · JPL
783935	2014 WO_{219}	—	October 28, 2014	Mount Lemmon	Mount Lemmon Survey	·	1.3 km	MPC · JPL
783936	2014 WK_{222}	—	October 22, 2014	Mount Lemmon	Mount Lemmon Survey	L5	6.5 km	MPC · JPL
783937	2014 WY_{224}	—	November 14, 2014	Kitt Peak	Spacewatch	·	1.3 km	MPC · JPL
783938	2014 WG_{228}	—	November 18, 2014	Haleakala	Pan-STARRS 1	·	1.3 km	MPC · JPL
783939	2014 WW_{229}	—	November 18, 2014	Haleakala	Pan-STARRS 1	·	1.2 km	MPC · JPL
783940	2014 WR_{230}	—	January 14, 2016	Haleakala	Pan-STARRS 1	·	1.4 km	MPC · JPL
783941	2014 WA_{238}	—	November 20, 2014	Haleakala	Pan-STARRS 1	·	1.0 km	MPC · JPL
783942	2014 WX_{238}	—	November 20, 2014	Haleakala	Pan-STARRS 1	·	1.2 km	MPC · JPL
783943	2014 WK_{240}	—	January 8, 2011	Mount Lemmon	Mount Lemmon Survey	·	1.3 km	MPC · JPL
783944	2014 WY_{240}	—	October 20, 2014	Mount Lemmon	Mount Lemmon Survey	H	620 m	MPC · JPL
783945	2014 WX_{245}	—	September 20, 2014	Haleakala	Pan-STARRS 1	·	1.2 km	MPC · JPL
783946	2014 WL_{251}	—	May 8, 2013	Haleakala	Pan-STARRS 1	·	1.3 km	MPC · JPL
783947	2014 WP_{257}	—	May 21, 2012	Mount Lemmon	Mount Lemmon Survey	·	2.9 km	MPC · JPL
783948	2014 WN_{260}	—	November 21, 2014	Haleakala	Pan-STARRS 1	·	1.4 km	MPC · JPL
783949	2014 WA_{263}	—	December 5, 2005	Kitt Peak	Spacewatch	·	1.5 km	MPC · JPL
783950	2014 WD_{264}	—	November 21, 2014	Haleakala	Pan-STARRS 1	·	1.3 km	MPC · JPL
783951	2014 WY_{267}	—	November 21, 2014	Haleakala	Pan-STARRS 1	·	1.1 km	MPC · JPL
783952	2014 WB_{268}	—	July 15, 2013	Haleakala	Pan-STARRS 1	PAD	1.2 km	MPC · JPL
783953	2014 WL_{270}	—	September 20, 2014	Haleakala	Pan-STARRS 1	·	2.5 km	MPC · JPL
783954	2014 WE_{271}	—	November 21, 2014	Haleakala	Pan-STARRS 1	·	820 m	MPC · JPL
783955	2014 WP_{273}	—	July 14, 2013	Haleakala	Pan-STARRS 1	HYG	2.3 km	MPC · JPL
783956	2014 WR_{273}	—	November 21, 2014	Haleakala	Pan-STARRS 1	·	1.3 km	MPC · JPL
783957	2014 WS_{276}	—	November 21, 2014	Haleakala	Pan-STARRS 1	·	1.8 km	MPC · JPL
783958	2014 WT_{278}	—	November 21, 2014	Haleakala	Pan-STARRS 1	·	1.6 km	MPC · JPL
783959	2014 WS_{279}	—	November 21, 2014	Haleakala	Pan-STARRS 1	EOS	1.4 km	MPC · JPL
783960	2014 WQ_{281}	—	November 21, 2014	Haleakala	Pan-STARRS 1	·	1.3 km	MPC · JPL
783961	2014 WG_{282}	—	August 8, 2013	Haleakala	Pan-STARRS 1	·	1.6 km	MPC · JPL
783962	2014 WD_{284}	—	January 27, 2007	Kitt Peak	Spacewatch	·	1.1 km	MPC · JPL
783963 Verkkoniemi	2014 WZ_{284}	Verkkoniemi	September 22, 2014	La Palma	EURONEAR	·	1.8 km	MPC · JPL
783964	2014 WD_{287}	—	October 25, 2014	Mount Lemmon	Mount Lemmon Survey	·	1.4 km	MPC · JPL
783965	2014 WQ_{288}	—	November 21, 2014	Haleakala	Pan-STARRS 1	EOS	1.4 km	MPC · JPL
783966	2014 WJ_{290}	—	November 21, 2014	Haleakala	Pan-STARRS 1	BRA	970 m	MPC · JPL
783967	2014 WP_{291}	—	November 21, 2014	Haleakala	Pan-STARRS 1	VER	2.1 km	MPC · JPL
783968	2014 WU_{294}	—	November 21, 2014	Haleakala	Pan-STARRS 1	·	2.2 km	MPC · JPL
783969	2014 WX_{295}	—	September 4, 2014	Haleakala	Pan-STARRS 1	·	1.6 km	MPC · JPL
783970	2014 WK_{298}	—	November 21, 2014	Haleakala	Pan-STARRS 1	·	2.2 km	MPC · JPL
783971	2014 WJ_{305}	—	October 30, 2014	Mount Lemmon	Mount Lemmon Survey	·	1.5 km	MPC · JPL
783972	2014 WL_{305}	—	August 12, 2013	Haleakala	Pan-STARRS 1	·	2.3 km	MPC · JPL
783973	2014 WC_{306}	—	November 22, 2014	Mount Lemmon	Mount Lemmon Survey	·	1.4 km	MPC · JPL
783974	2014 WU_{306}	—	October 30, 2014	Mount Lemmon	Mount Lemmon Survey	·	1.2 km	MPC · JPL
783975	2014 WJ_{307}	—	November 22, 2014	Mount Lemmon	Mount Lemmon Survey	·	1.4 km	MPC · JPL
783976	2014 WT_{307}	—	September 15, 2009	Kitt Peak	Spacewatch	·	1.4 km	MPC · JPL
783977	2014 WG_{308}	—	November 22, 2014	Mount Lemmon	Mount Lemmon Survey	615	1.1 km	MPC · JPL
783978	2014 WR_{311}	—	November 22, 2014	Mount Lemmon	Mount Lemmon Survey	·	2.0 km	MPC · JPL
783979	2014 WT_{312}	—	August 23, 2014	Haleakala	Pan-STARRS 1	·	1.6 km	MPC · JPL
783980	2014 WV_{315}	—	October 25, 2014	Haleakala	Pan-STARRS 1	EOS	1.3 km	MPC · JPL
783981	2014 WM_{316}	—	June 9, 2013	Kitt Peak	Spacewatch	·	1.4 km	MPC · JPL
783982	2014 WK_{320}	—	March 15, 2012	Mount Lemmon	Mount Lemmon Survey	·	1.1 km	MPC · JPL
783983	2014 WE_{324}	—	February 11, 2011	Mount Lemmon	Mount Lemmon Survey	·	1.4 km	MPC · JPL
783984	2014 WQ_{324}	—	February 5, 2011	Haleakala	Pan-STARRS 1	·	1.3 km	MPC · JPL
783985	2014 WL_{326}	—	October 29, 2014	Haleakala	Pan-STARRS 1	·	1.5 km	MPC · JPL
783986	2014 WN_{327}	—	October 29, 2014	Haleakala	Pan-STARRS 1	EOS	1.4 km	MPC · JPL
783987	2014 WP_{329}	—	October 23, 2014	Kitt Peak	Spacewatch	EOS	1.3 km	MPC · JPL
783988	2014 WR_{331}	—	October 25, 2014	Haleakala	Pan-STARRS 1	·	1.3 km	MPC · JPL
783989	2014 WC_{332}	—	November 22, 2014	Haleakala	Pan-STARRS 1	·	970 m	MPC · JPL
783990	2014 WZ_{334}	—	August 27, 2009	Kitt Peak	Spacewatch	·	1.3 km	MPC · JPL
783991	2014 WE_{335}	—	August 31, 2014	Haleakala	Pan-STARRS 1	·	1.5 km	MPC · JPL
783992	2014 WJ_{337}	—	November 22, 2014	Haleakala	Pan-STARRS 1	EOS	1.2 km	MPC · JPL
783993	2014 WJ_{341}	—	November 22, 2014	Haleakala	Pan-STARRS 1	·	2.1 km	MPC · JPL
783994	2014 WP_{341}	—	October 29, 2014	Haleakala	Pan-STARRS 1	·	2.4 km	MPC · JPL
783995	2014 WS_{343}	—	August 20, 2004	Kitt Peak	Spacewatch	·	1.3 km	MPC · JPL
783996	2014 WQ_{344}	—	November 22, 2014	Haleakala	Pan-STARRS 1	·	1.5 km	MPC · JPL
783997	2014 WG_{345}	—	November 22, 2014	Haleakala	Pan-STARRS 1	·	1.4 km	MPC · JPL
783998	2014 WF_{352}	—	August 20, 2009	Kitt Peak	Spacewatch	·	1.1 km	MPC · JPL
783999	2014 WL_{359}	—	January 2, 2011	Mount Lemmon	Mount Lemmon Survey	·	1.5 km	MPC · JPL
784000	2014 WS_{359}	—	August 25, 2014	Haleakala	Pan-STARRS 1	EOS	1.4 km	MPC · JPL

back to top

== Meaning of names ==
As minor planet discoveries are confirmed, they are given a permanent number by the IAU's Minor Planet Center (MPC), and the discoverers can then submit names for them, following the IAU's naming conventions. The list below concerns those minor planets in the specified number-range that have received names, and explains the meanings of those names.

Official naming citations of newly named small Solar System bodies are approved and published in a bulletin by IAU's Working Group for Small Bodies Nomenclature (WGSBN). Before May 2021, citations were published in MPC's Minor Planet Circulars for many decades. Recent citations can also be found on the JPL Small-Body Database (SBDB). Until his death in 2016, German astronomer Lutz D. Schmadel compiled these citations into the Dictionary of Minor Planet Names (DMP) and regularly updated the collection.

Based on Paul Herget's The Names of the Minor Planets, Schmadel also researched the unclear origin of numerous asteroids, most of which had been named prior to World War II. This article incorporates text from this source, which is in the public domain: SBDB New namings may only be added to this list below after official publication as the preannouncement of names is condemned. The WGSBN publishes a comprehensive guideline for the naming rules of non-cometary small Solar System bodies.

Named minor planet	Provisional	This minor planet was named for...	Ref · Catalog
783129 Danescu	2014 OS_{442}	Cristian Danescu, Romanian researcher at the Romanian Astronomical Institute.	IAU · 783129
783560 Beldea	2014 SY_{205}	Cătălin Beldea, Romanian amateur astronomer.	IAU · 783560
783839 Vasilechirila	2014 VY_{21}	Vasile Chirila, Romanian amateur astronomer.	IAU · 783839
783963 Verkkoniemi	2014 WZ_{284}	Markku Verkkoniemi, Finnish software engineer who worked as a system manager at the Nordic Optical Telescope from 2001 to 2004.	IAU · 783963
