= 427P/ATLAS =

Periodic comet and active asteroid

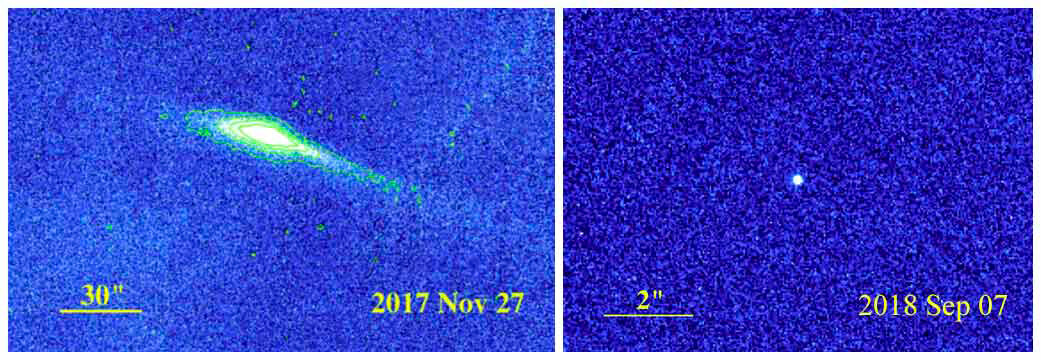
- Comet 427P/ATLAS photographed from the WIYN Observatory (left) and the Hubble Space Telescope (right).

Discovery
- Discovered by: Aren Heinze
- Discovery site: ATLAS–HKO (T05)
- Discovery date: 27 September 2017

Designations
- MPC designation: P/2017 S5, P/2021 L6
- Alternative designations: ATLAS 2

Orbital characteristics
- Epoch: 23 November 2017 (JD 2458080.5)
- Observation arc: 3.89 years
- Earliest precovery date: 11 September 2017
- Number of observations: 438
- Aphelion: 4.163 AU
- Perihelion: 2.178 AU
- Semi-major axis: 3.171 AU
- Eccentricity: 0.31304
- Orbital period: 5.646 years
- Inclination: 11.849°
- Longitude of ascending node: 252.39°
- Argument of periapsis: 99.944°
- Mean anomaly: 20.594°
- Last perihelion: 19 March 2023
- Next perihelion: 31 October 2028
- T_{Jupiter}: 3.092
- Earth MOID: 1.210 AU
- Jupiter MOID: 1.664 AU

Physical characteristics
- Mean radius: 0.45 ± 0.06 km (0.280 ± 0.037 mi)
- Synodic rotation period: ~1.4 hours
- Geometric albedo: 0.06±0.02
- Spectral type: (V–R) = 0.43±0.05
- Comet total magnitude (M1): 10.7
- Comet nuclear magnitude (M2): 15.8

427P/ATLAS is a periodic comet and an active asteroid with a 5.65-year orbit around the Sun. It is the second comet discovered by the Asteroid Terrestrial-impact Last Alert System after 478P/ATLAS.

== Orbit ==
The comet orbits within the main asteroid belt at distances between 2.18 AU (326 million km) and 4.16 AU (622 million km) from the Sun. Studies of its orbital trajectory revealed that it is highly likely a member of the Theobalda collisional family, a group of asteroids formed from a large, shattered parent body about 7 million years ago. The main-belt comets 455P/PanSTARRS and 483P/PanSTARRS also belong to this group.

== Physical characteristics ==
Like most of the main-belt comets, the observed activity from 427P/ATLAS is driven by the sublimation of water ice on its surface, which its mass loss rate is estimated to be about ~5.0±3.0 kg/sec^{−1} during its perihelion in 2017.

Photometric observations from the Lisnyky Observatory showed that this comet has some notable instability of color, likely caused by the injection of fresh material to its coma.

Observations from the Hubble Space Telescope in 2019 had determined that its nucleus has an effective radius of 0.450±0.060 km, assuming a geometric albedo of 0.06±0.02.

Numbered comets
Previous; 426P/PanSTARRS	427P/ATLAS	Next; 428P/Gibbs
