= Comet Elenin (disambiguation) =

Comet Elenin typically refers to Leonid Elenin's first comet discovery, C/2010 X1 (Elenin). It may also refer to four other comets he also discovered:

- 479P/Elenin – also known as P/2011 NO_{1} or P/2023 WM_{26}
- P/2014 X1 (Elenin)
- C/2015 X4 (Elenin)
- C/2017 A3 (Elenin)
