= 217P/LINEAR =

Periodic comet with 8 year orbit

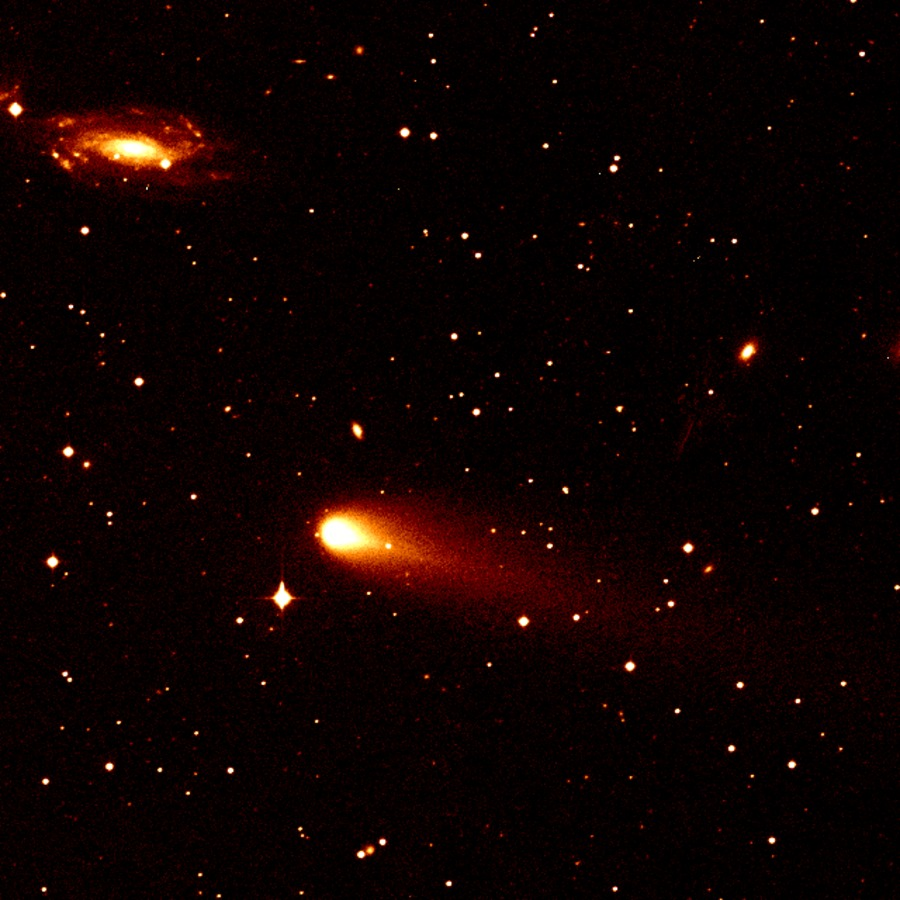
- Comet LINEAR 17 photographed by the Palomar Transient Factory on 18 August 2009

Discovery
- Discovered by: LINEAR
- Discovery date: 11 July 2001

Designations
- MPC designation: P/2001 MD_{7}, P/2009 F3
- Alternative designations: LINEAR 17

Orbital characteristics
- Epoch: September 1, 2010 (2455440.5)
- Aphelion: 6.665 AU
- Perihelion: 1.224 AU
- Semi-major axis: 3.944 AU
- Eccentricity: 0.6896
- Orbital period: 7.834 a 2861.4 d
- Inclination: 12.880°
- Longitude of ascending node: 125.621°
- Argument of periapsis: 246.767°
- Last perihelion: 24 May 2025; 16 July 2017
- Next perihelion: 2033-Feb-11
- T_{Jupiter}: 2.548
- Earth MOID: 0.308 AU
- Comet total magnitude (M1): 13.8

217P/LINEAR is a periodic Jupiter-family comet with an orbital period of 7.83 years. It was discovered by LINEAR on 11 July 2001.

Upon discovery the comet was diffuse. It was later identified as an asteroidal object with an estimated magnitude of 17.6 detected on 21 and 24 June 2001, again by LINEAR, that had been named 2001 MD_{7}. A preliminary orbit indicated an orbital period of 7.5 years. The comet brightened up to an apparent magnitude of 12 from November 2001 to January 2002.

The comet was recovered in images obtained remotely by Ernesto Guido, Giovanni Sostero, and Paul Camilleri in images obtained on 17 and 18 March 2009 with a remotely operated reflector telescope with an estimated apparent magnitude of around 18.2. The comet has a diffuse coma 15 arcseconds across. In mid October, around 13.4 October, 34 days after perihelion, an outburst took place, during which the comet brightened by 1.7 – 2.3 magnitudes and an expanding dust cloud was observed. The estimated mass loss from the comet was estimated to be 10^{6}–10^{9} kg, while no fragments were observed.

The comet is a near-Earth object, with a minimum orbit intersection distance of 0.308 AU (46.1 million km). The comet will approach Earth to a distance of 0.396 AU on 7 September 2048. The comet also has close approaches to Mars, approaching to a distance of 0.1 AU on 12 November 1905 and an even closer approach will take place on 1 April 2056, when the comet will approach to a distance of 0.064 AU (9.6 million km).

Numbered comets
Previous; 216P/LINEAR	217P/LINEAR	Next; 218P/LINEAR
