= List of numbered comets =

Periodic comets numbered by the Minor Planet Center

This is a list of periodic comets that were numbered by the Minor Planet Center after having been observed on at least two occasions. Their orbital periods vary from 3.2 to 366 years. As of August 2026, there are 516 numbered comets (1P–516P). There are 442 Jupiter-family comets (JFCs), 45 Encke-type comets (ETCs), 15 Halley-type comets (HTCs), five Chiron-type comets (CTCs), and one long-period comet (153P). 79 bodies are also near-Earth comets (NECs). In addition, nine numbered comets are principally classified as minor planets – six main-belt comets, two centaurs (CEN), (Note: This figure includes 95P/Chiron, which is also the archtype of the Chiron-type comets (CTCs)) and one Apollo asteroid – and display characteristics of both an asteroid and a comet.

Occasionally, comets will break up into multiple chunks, as volatiles coming off the comet and rotational forces may cause it to break into two or more pieces. An extreme example of this is 73P/Schwassmann–Wachmann, which broke into over 50 pieces during its 1995 perihelion.

Comets visited by spacecraft are highlighted in lime, while those proposed to be visited are highlighted in yellow.

== List ==
=== 1 to 100 ===
Comet designation	MPC designations	Discoverer(s) or namesake(s)	Period (years)	e	a (AU)	i (°)	Abs. mag (M1)	Nucleus radii	Class	NEC	Ref
1P/Halley	(See Apparitions)	E. Halley	75.91	0.9679	17.928	162.19	5.5	5.5 km	HTC	✓	MPC · JPL
2P/Encke	P/1786 B1; P/1795 V1; P/1805 U1; P/1818 W1; P/1822 L1	J. Encke	3.30	0.8483	2.215	11.78	15.6	2.43 km	ETC	✓	MPC · JPL
3D/Biela	D/1772 E1; D/1826 D1; D/1832 S1	W. Biela	6.65	0.7513	3.535	13.22	7.1	0.25 km	JFC	✓	JPL
4P/Faye	P/1843 W1; P/1850 W1	H. Faye	7.40	0.5845	3.798	8.16	11.0	1.77 km	JFC	–	MPC · JPL
5D/Brorsen	D/1846 D2; D/1857 F1	T. Brorsen	5.46	0.8098	3.101	29.38	8.3	–	JFC	✓	JPL
6P/d'Arrest	P/1678 R1; P/1851 M1; P/1857 X1	H. d'Arrest	6.54	0.6127	3.497	19.51	15.9	1.6 km	JFC	–	MPC · JPL
7P/Pons–Winnecke	P/1819 L1; P/1858 E1; P/1869 G1	J.-L. Pons; F. Winnecke	6.32	0.6376	3.419	22.33	16.0	2.24 km	JFC	✓	MPC · JPL
8P/Tuttle	P/1790 A2; P/1858 A1; P/1871 T1	H. Tuttle	13.61	0.8198	5.700	54.98	14.6	2.25 km	JFC	✓	MPC · JPL
9P/Tempel (Tempel 1)	P/1867 G1; P/1873 G1; P/1967 L1; P/1972 A1	W. Tempel	5.58	0.5098	3.146	10.47	12.8	3.0 km	JFC	–	MPC · JPL
10P/Tempel (Tempel 2)	P/1873 N1; P/1878 O1	W. Tempel	5.37	0.5363	3.065	12.03	14.3	5.8 km	JFC	–	MPC · JPL
11P/Tempel–Swift–LINEAR	D/1869 W1; D/1880 T1; P/2001 X3	W. Tempel; L. Swift; LINEAR	5.96	0.5774	3.289	14.44	15.2	0.6 km	JFC	–	MPC · JPL
12P/Pons–Brooks	X/245?; C/1385 U1; C/1457 A1; P/1812 O1; P/1883 R1; P/1953 M1	J.-L. Pons; W. Brooks	71.20	0.9545	17.178	74.19	5.0	2.2 km	HTC	✓	MPC · JPL
13P/Olbers	P/1814 E1; P/1887 Q1; P/1956 A1	H. Olbers	68.70	0.9306	16.774	44.65	4.3	10 km	HTC	✓	MPC · JPL
14P/Wolf	P/1884 S1; P/1891 J1	M. F. Wolf	8.75	0.3575	4.247	27.94	15.6	3.16 km	JFC	–	MPC · JPL
15P/Finlay	P/1886 S1; D/1893 K1	W. Finlay	6.52	0.7202	3.490	6.80	14.9	1.21 km	JFC	✓	MPC · JPL
16P/Brooks (Brooks 2)	P/1889 N1; P/1896 M1	W. Brooks	6.20	0.5690	3.375	4.31	12.2	1.59 km	JFC	–	MPC · JPL
17P/Holmes	D/1892 V1; D/1899 L1; P/1964 O1	E. Holmes	6.91	0.4302	3.626	19.07	9.4	1.71 km	JFC	–	MPC · JPL
18D/Perrine–Mrkos	D/1896 X1; D/1909 P1; D/1955 U1	C. D. Perrine; A. Mrkos	6.72	0.6426	3.560	17.76	11.5	–	JFC	✓	JPL
19P/Borrelly	P/1904 Y2; P/1911 S1	A. Borrelly	6.85	0.6379	3.607	29.32	9.8	4.0 km	JFC	–	MPC · JPL
20D/Westphal	D/1852 O1; D/1913 S1	J. Westphal	61.87	0.9198	15.642	40.89	8.8	–	HTC	✓	JPL
21P/Giacobini–Zinner	P/1900 Y1; P/1913 U1	M. Giacobini; E. Zinner	6.55	0.7105	3.500	32.00	13.1	1.0 km	JFC	✓	MPC · JPL
22P/Kopff	P/1906 Q1; P/1919 O1	A. Kopff	6.39	0.5486	3.444	4.74	11.9	3.0 km	JFC	–	MPC · JPL
23P/Brorsen–Metcalf	P/1847 O1; P/1919 Q1; P/1989 N1	T. Brorsen; J. H. Metcalf	70.52	0.9720	17.069	19.33	7.8	5.0 km	HTC	✓	MPC · JPL
24P/Schaumasse	P/1911 X1; P/1919 U1	A. Schaumasse	8.26	0.7048	4.086	11.73	12.0	0.91 km	JFC	✓	MPC · JPL
25D/Neujmin (Neujmin 2)	D/1916 D1; D/1926 V2	G. N. Neujmin	5.43	0.5668	3.089	10.64	12.5	–	JFC	–	JPL
26P/Grigg–Skjellerup	P/1808 C1; P/1902 O1; P/1922 K1; P/1927 F1	J. Grigg; J. Skjellerup	5.30	0.6339	3.038	22.41	16.8	1.3 km	JFC	✓	MPC · JPL
27P/Crommelin	D/1818 D1; D/1873 V1; P/1928 W1; P/1956 S1	A. Crommelin	27.42	0.9193	9.093	29.22	12.7	6.0 km	HTC	✓	MPC · JPL
28P/Neujmin (Neujmin 1)	P/1913 R2; P/1931 S1	G. N. Neujmin	18.45	0.7736	6.982	14.31	13.2	9.7 km	JFC	–	MPC · JPL
29P/Schwassmann–Wachmann (Schwassmann-Wachmann 1)	P/1902 E1; P/1927 V1	A. Schwassmann; A. Wachmann	14.87	0.0448	6.047	9.36	10.1	30.2 km	JFC	–	MPC · JPL
30P/Reinmuth (Reinmuth 1)	P/1928 D1; P/1934 V1	K. W. Reinmuth	7.33	0.5018	3.774	8.13	13.7	3.9 km	JFC	–	MPC · JPL
31P/Schwassmann–Wachmann (Schwassmann–Wachmann 2)	P/1929 B1; P/1934 X1	A. Schwassmann; A. Wachmann	8.74	0.1930	4.243	4.55	7.2	3.1 km	JFC	–	MPC · JPL
32P/Comas Solà	P/1926 V1; P/1935 P1	J. Comas Solà	9.56	0.5560	4.506	9.97	10.6	2.52 km	JFC	–	MPC · JPL
33P/Daniel	P/1909 X1; P/1937 B1	Z. Daniel	8.09	0.4624	4.030	22.39	15.4	0.91 km	JFC	–	MPC · JPL
34D/Gale	D/1927 L1; D/1938 J1	W. F. Gale	11.01	0.7607	4.944	11.73	10.5	–	JFC	✓	JPL
35P/Herschel–Rigollet	C/1788 Y1; C/1939 O1	C. Herschel; R. Rigollet	155.11	0.9741	28.844	64.21	8.3		HTC	✓	MPC · JPL
36P/Whipple	P/1925 QD; P/1933 U1; P/1940 R1	F. L. Whipple	8.50	0.2582	4.165	9.94	10.5	2.55 km	JFC	–	MPC · JPL
37P/Forbes	P/1929 P1; P/1942 L1	A. F. I. Forbes	6.42	0.5345	3.456	8.96	11.5	1.1 km	JFC	–	MPC · JPL
38P/Stephan–Oterma	D/1867 B1; P/1942 V1; P/1980 L2	E. Stephan; L. Oterma	37.93	0.8593	11.289	18.35	11.5	3.435 km	HTC	–	MPC · JPL
39P/Oterma	P/1943 G1; P/2001 P3	L. Oterma	20.13	0.2293	7.399	1.47	7.1	3.0 km	CTC	–	MPC · JPL
40P/Väisälä (Väisälä 1)	P/1939 CB; P/1949 Y1	Y. Väisälä	10.98	0.6316	4.940	11.49	11.7	2.05 km	JFC	–	MPC · JPL
41P/Tuttle–Giacobini–Kresák	D/1858 J1; D/1907 L1; P/1951 H1	H. P. Tuttle; M. Giacobini; L. Kresák	5.42	0.6613	3.085	9.23	16.9	0.44–0.56 km	JFC	✓	MPC · JPL
42P/Neujmin (Neujmin 3)	P/1929 P2; P/1951 J1	G. N. Neujmin	10.77	0.5842	4.876	3.98	13.2	0.69 km	JFC	–	MPC · JPL
43P/Wolf–Harrington	P/1924 Y1; P/1951 T2	M. F. Wolf; R. G. Harrington	6.13	0.5949	3.350	15.97	8.6	2.38 km	JFC	–	MPC · JPL
44P/Reinmuth (Reinmuth 2)	P/1947 R1; P/1953 N1	K. W. Reinmuth	7.09	0.4262	3.691	5.90	14.4	1.61 km	JFC	–	MPC · JPL
45P/Honda–Mrkos–Pajdušáková	P/1948 X1; P/1954 C1	M. Honda; A. Mrkos; L. Pajdušáková	5.26	0.8240	3.026	4.25	13.7	0.6–0.65 km	JFC	✓	MPC · JPL
46P/Wirtanen	P/1948 A1; P/1954 R2	C. A. Wirtanen	5.44	0.6588	3.093	11.75	16.6	0.6 km	JFC	✓	MPC · JPL
47P/Ashbrook–Jackson	P/1948 Q1; P/1955 H1	J. Ashbrook; C. Jackson	8.34	0.3188	4.114	13.05	12.0	2.95 km	JFC	–	MPC · JPL
48P/Johnson	P/1949 Q1; P/1956 P1	E. L. Johnson	6.95	0.3678	3.642	13.66	9.8	2.2 km	JFC	–	MPC · JPL
49P/Arend–Rigaux	P/1951 C2; P/1958 B1	S. Arend; F. Rigaux	6.72	0.6003	3.563	19.05	14.3	5.0 km	JFC	–	MPC · JPL
50P/Arend	P/1951 T1; P/1959 N1	S. Arend	8.27	0.5300	4.088	19.16	13.8	0.95 km	JFC	–	MPC · JPL
51P/Harrington [list]	P/1953 P1; P/1960 P1	R. G. Harrington	7.15	0.5420	3.710	5.42	18.6	2.01 km	JFC	–	MPC · JPL list
52P/Harrington–Abell	P/1955 F1; P/1962 B1	R. G. Harrington; G. O. Abell	7.58	0.5401	3.859	10.23	11.8	1.43 km	JFC	–	MPC · JPL
53P/Van Biesbroeck	P/1954 R1; P/1965 J1	G. Van Biesbroeck	12.56	0.5511	5.405	6.61	10.0	3.33–3.37 km	JFC	–	MPC · JPL
54P/de Vico–Swift–NEAT	D/1844 Q1; D/1894 W1; D/1965 M1; P/2002 T4	F. de Vico; E. Swift; NEAT	7.38	0.4270	3.790	6.07	13.1	2.35 km	JFC	–	MPC · JPL
55P/Tempel–Tuttle	P/1366 U1; P/1699 U1; D/1865 Y1; P/1965 M2; P/1997 E1	W. Tempel; H. P. Tuttle	33.24	0.9056	10.338	162.49	10.0	1.8 km	HTC	✓	MPC · JPL
56P/Slaughter–Burnham	P/1959 B1; P/1969 V1	C. Slaughter; R. Burnham	11.47	0.5073	5.086	8.15	9.3	3.0 km	JFC	–	MPC · JPL
57P/du Toit–Neujmin–Delporte [list]	P/1941 O1; P/1941 OE; P/1970 N2; P/1983 RD_{6}	D. du Toit; G. N. Neujmin; E. Delporte	6.41	0.4998	3.450	2.85	15.8	0.78 km (A)	JFC	–	MPC · JPL list
58P/Jackson–Neujmin	P/1936 S1; P/1970 R1	C. Jackson; G. N. Neujmin	8.25	0.6626	4.083	13.11	9.1	0.6 km	JFC	–	MPC · JPL
59P/Kearns–Kwee	P/1963 Q1; P/1971 O1	C. Kearns; K. Kwee	9.52	0.4764	4.491	9.34	10.4	0.76 km	JFC	–	MPC · JPL
60P/Tsuchinshan (Tsuchinshan 2)	P/1965 A2; P/1971 S1	Tsuchinshan	6.58	0.5385	3.510	3.61	9.3	0.69 km	JFC	–	MPC · JPL
61P/Shajn–Schaldach	P/1949 S1; P/1971 S2	P. F. Shajn; R. D. Schaldach	7.06	0.4255	3.680	6.01	13.9	0.64 km	JFC	–	MPC · JPL
62P/Tsuchinshan (Tsuchinshan 1)	P/1965 A1; P/1971 Y1	Tsuchinshan	6.37	0.5974	3.437	9.71	8.2	1.09 km	JFC	–	MPC · JPL
63P/Wild (Wild 1)	P/1960 G1; P/1973 A2	P. Wild	13.21	0.6509	5.588	19.78	6.5	1.46 km	JFC	–	MPC · JPL
64P/Swift–Gehrels	D/1889 W1; P/1973 C1	L. A. Swift; T. Gehrels	9.41	0.6873	4.456	8.95	14.5	1.61 km	JFC	–	MPC · JPL
65P/Gunn	P/1954 P1; P/1970 U2	J. E. Gunn	7.64	0.2500	3.880	9.19	10.5	5.4 km	JFC	–	MPC · JPL
66P/du Toit	P/1944 K1; P/1974 F2	D. du Toit	14.78	0.7866	6.023	18.67	15.7	0.46 km	JFC	✓	MPC · JPL
67P/Churyumov–Gerasimenko	P/1969 R1; P/1975 P1	K. Churyumov; S. Gerasimenko	6.44	0.6409	3.462	7.04	12.9	1.7 km	JFC	✓	MPC · JPL
68P/Klemola	P/1965 U1; P/1976 P1	A. R. Klemola	10.84	0.6403	4.899	11.18	11.2	2.5 km	JFC	–	MPC · JPL
69P/Taylor	D/1915 W1; P/1976 X1	C. Taylor	7.67	0.4136	3.889	22.04	17.3	0.83 km	JFC	–	MPC · JPL
70P/Kojima	P/1970 Y1; P/1977 X1; P/2025 MJ_{354}	N. Kojima	7.04	0.4540	3.675	6.60	12.2	1.84 km	JFC	–	MPC · JPL
71P/Clark	P/1973 L1; P/1978 G1	M. Clark	5.56	0.4945	3.139	9.44	11.1	0.83 km	JFC	–	MPC · JPL
72P/Denning–Fujikawa	D/1881 T1; P/1978 T2	W. Denning; S. Fujikawa	9.04	0.8194	4.340	9.17	17.6	0.6 km	JFC	✓	MPC · JPL
73P/Schwassmann–Wachmann [list] (Schwassmann–Wachmann 3)	D/1930 J1; P/1979 P1	A. Schwassmann; A. Wachmann	5.44	0.6855	3.091	11.24	14.3	0.96 km	JFC	✓	MPC · JPL list
74P/Smirnova–Chernykh	P/1967 EU; P/1975 E2	T. Smirnova; N. S. Chernykh	8.50	0.1477	4.166	6.65	6.8	2.23 km	ETC	–	MPC · JPL
75D/Kohoutek	D/1975 C1; D/1980 P1	L. Kohoutek	6.67	0.4963	3.543	5.91	10.5	1.7 km	JFC	–	MPC · JPL
76P/West–Kohoutek–Ikemura	P/1975 D1; P/1980 V2	R. M. West; L. Kohoutek; T. Ikemura	6.47	0.5384	3.471	30.48	15.4	0.31 km	JFC	–	MPC · JPL
77P/Longmore	P/1975 L1; P/1981 A1	A. Longmore	6.87	0.3542	3.612	24.34	9.1	2.01 km	JFC	–	MPC · JPL
78P/Gehrels (Gehrels 2)	P/1973 S1; P/1981 L1	T. Gehrels	7.22	0.4616	3.736	6.25	9.0	4.28 km	JFC	–	MPC · JPL
79P/du Toit–Hartley	D/1945 G1; P/1982 C1	D. du Toit; M. Hartley	5.28	0.5941	3.031	2.89	17.4	0.56 km	JFC	✓	MPC · JPL
80P/Peters–Hartley	D/1846 M1; P/1982 N1	C. H. F. Peters; M. Hartley	8.07	0.5994	4.023	29.93	11.8	5.22 km	JFC	–	MPC · JPL
81P/Wild (Wild 2)	P/1978 A2; P/1983 S1	P. Wild	6.41	0.5375	3.450	3.24	9.8	2.75 km	JFC	–	MPC · JPL
82P/Gehrels (Gehrels 3)	P/1975 U1; P/1984 P1	T. Gehrels	8.41	0.1233	4.135	1.13	7.6	0.71 km	ETC	–	MPC · JPL
83D/Russell (Russell 1)	D/1979 M2; D/1985 G1	K. S. Russell	6.10	0.5172	3.338	22.66	14.0	–	JFC	–	JPL
84P/Giclas	P/1978 R2; P/1985 M1	H. L. Giclas	6.95	0.4945	3.641	7.28	14.2	0.90 km	JFC	–	MPC · JPL
85D/Boethin	D/1975 A1; D/1985 T2	L. Boethin	11.81	0.7812	5.185	4.30	–	0.7–4.6 km	JFC	✓	JPL
86P/Wild (Wild 3)	P/1980 G1; P/1987 B3	P. Wild	6.85	0.3722	3.605	15.47	17.2	0.42 km	JFC	–	MPC · JPL
87P/Bus	P/1981 E1; P/1987 B4	S. J. Bus	6.38	0.3893	3.441	2.60	12.7	0.29 km	ETC	–	MPC · JPL
88P/Howell	P/1981 Q1; P/1987 E1	E. S. Howell	5.48	0.5631	3.109	4.38	12.1	0.96 km	JFC	–	MPC · JPL
89P/Russell (Russell 2)	P/1980 S1; P/1987 N1	K. S. Russell	7.26	0.4080	3.751	12.08	11.2	0.89 km	JFC	–	MPC · JPL
90P/Gehrels (Gehrels 1)	P/1972 T1; P/1987 Q2	T. Gehrels	14.95	0.5098	6.069	9.64	7.0	2.64 km	JFC	–	MPC · JPL
91P/Russell (Russell 3)	P/1983 L1; P/1989 A4	K. S.Russell	7.67	0.3302	3.890	14.09	7.7	1.26 km	JFC	–	MPC · JPL
92P/Sanguin	P/1977 T2; P/1989 J1	J. Sanguin	12.40	0.6593	5.358	19.44	11.1	2.08 km	JFC	–	MPC · JPL
93P/Lovas (Lovas 1)	P/1980 X1; P/1989 N2	M. Lovas	9.20	0.6127	4.389	12.20	12.5	2.6 km	JFC	–	MPC · JPL
94P/Russell (Russell 4)	P/1984 E1; P/1989 X2	K. S. Russell	6.58	0.3641	3.511	6.18	13.4	2.6 km	ETC	–	MPC · JPL
95P/Chiron (2060 Chiron)	P/1977 UB	C. T. Kowal	50.78	0.3764	13.713	6.92	5.6	126 km	CEN/CTC	–	MPC · JPL
96P/Machholz (Machholz 1)	P/1986 J2	D. E. Machholz	5.29	0.9592	3.035	58.14	13.6	3.2 km	JFC	✓	MPC · JPL
97P/Metcalf–Brewington	D/1906 V2; P/1991 A1	J. H. Metcalf; H. Brewington	10.52	0.4569	4.800	17.86	15.2	2.36 km	JFC	–	MPC · JPL
98P/Takamizawa	P/1984 O1; P/1991 D1	K. Takamizawa	7.42	0.5606	3.806	10.55	14.6	0.42 km	JFC	–	MPC · JPL
99P/Kowal (Kowal 1)	P/1977 H2; P/1991 D2	C. T. Kowal	15.20	0.2296	6.136	4.34	6.7	4.8 km	JFC	–	MPC · JPL
100P/Hartley (Hartley 1)	P/1985 L1; P/1991 E1	M. Hartley	6.35	0.4138	3.428	25.58	10.0	2.48 km	JFC	–	MPC · JPL
Comet designation	MPC designations	Discoverer(s) or namesake(s)	Period (years)	e	a (AU)	i (°)	Abs. mag (M1)	Nucleus radii	Class	NEC	Ref

back to top

=== 101 to 200 ===
Comet designation	MPC designations	Discoverer(s) or namesake(s)	Period (years)	e	a (AU)	i (°)	Abs. mag (M1)	Nucleus radii	Class	NEC	Ref
101P/Chernykh [list]	P/1977 Q1; P/1991 L1	N. S. Chernykh	13.90	0.5978	5.782	5.03	13.7	2.2 km	JFC	–	MPC · JPL list
102P/Shoemaker (Shoemaker 1)	P/1984 S2; P/1991 L2	C. & E. Shoemaker	7.22	0.4732	3.737	26.24	16.2	0.208 km	JFC	–	MPC · JPL
103P/Hartley (Hartley 2)	P/1986 E2; P/1991 N1	M. Hartley	6.48	0.6938	3.475	13.61	16.3	0.8 km	JFC	✓	MPC · JPL
104P/Kowal (Kowal 2)	P/1979 B1; P/1991 X1	C. T. Kowal	5.74	0.6655	3.208	5.70	14.6	1.0 km	JFC	✓	MPC · JPL
105P/Singer Brewster	P/1986 J1; P/1992 G1	S. Singer-Brewster	6.47	0.4093	3.472	9.17	13.8	1.0 km	JFC	–	MPC · JPL
106P/Schuster	P/1977 T1; P/1992 O1	H.-E. Schuster	7.27	0.5895	3.754	20.20	11.2	0.94 km	JFC	–	MPC · JPL
107P/Wilson–Harrington (4015 Wilson–Harrington)	P/1979 VA	E. F. Helin; A. G. Wilson; R. Harrington	4.25	0.6316	2.625	2.80	–	2.0 km	Apollo, NEO, PHA	✓	MPC · JPL
108P/Ciffréo	P/1985 V1; P/1992 S1	J. Ciffréo	6.95	0.5810	3.642	13.98	10.9	0.5 km	JFC	–	MPC · JPL
109P/Swift–Tuttle	P/–68 Q1; P/188 O1; P/1737 N1; D/1862 O1; P/1992 S2	L. Swift; H. P. Tuttle	133.28	0.9632	26.092	113.45	4.5	13 km	HTC	✓	MPC · JPL
110P/Hartley (Hartley 3)	P/1988 D1; P/1993 M1	M. Hartley	6.84	0.3163	3.604	11.70	4.3	2.31 km	JFC	–	MPC · JPL
111P/Helin–Roman–Crockett	P/1989 A2	E. F. Helin; B. Roman; R. Crockett	8.49	0.1096	4.160	4.23	8.4	0.46–1.39 km	ETC	–	MPC · JPL
112P/Urata–Niijima	P/1986 UD; P/1986 TD_{4}; P/1986 WP_{5}; P/1993 U1	T. Urata; T. Niijima	6.65	0.5875	3.536	24.20	14.5	0.90 km	JFC	–	MPC · JPL
113P/Spitaler	D/1890 W1; P/1993 U2	R. Spitaler	7.06	0.4245	3.682	5.78	14.3	1.15 km	JFC	–	MPC · JPL
114P/Wiseman–Skiff	P/1986 Y1; P/1993 X2	J. Wiseman; B. A. Skiff	6.67	0.5545	3.545	18.27	13.9	0.78 km	JFC	–	MPC · JPL
115P/Maury	P/1985 Q1; P/1994 J1	A. Maury	8.83	0.5183	4.271	11.67	13.0	1.10 km	JFC	–	JPL
116P/Wild (Wild 4)	P/1990 B1; P/1994 V1	P. Wild	6.50	0.3723	3.484	3.61	7.6	3.03 km	ETC	–	MPC · JPL
117P/Helin–Roman–Alu (Helin–Roman–Alu 1)	P/1989 T2	E. F. Helin; B. Roman; J. T. Alu	8.28	0.2547	4.092	8.70	6.5	16.4 km	JFC	–	MPC · JPL
118P/Shoemaker–Levy (Shoemaker–Levy 4)	P/1995 M1; P/1991 C2	C. & E. Shoemaker; D. H. Levy	6.16	0.4549	3.359	10.10	12.3	2.61 km	JFC	–	MPC · JPL
119P/Parker–Hartley	P/1986 TF; P/1989 E1; P/1995 M2	Q. A. Parker; M. Hartley	8.90	0.2954	4.294	5.18	9.6	1.83 km	JFC	–	MPC · JPL
120P/Mueller (Mueller 1)	P/1987 U2; P/1995 O2	J. E. Mueller	8.41	0.3365	4.136	8.79	6.6	0.77 km	JFC	–	MPC · JPL
121P/Shoemaker–Holt (Shoemaker–Holt 2)	P/1989 E2; P/1995 Q3	C. & E. Shoemaker; H. E. Holt	8.05	0.3399	4.016	17.74	6.0	3.61 km	JFC	–	MPC · JPL
122P/de Vico	D/1846 D1; P/1995 S1	F. de Vico	74.35	0.9627	17.681	85.38	7.5		HTC	✓	MPC · JPL
123P/West–Hartley	P/1989 E3; P/1995 S2	R. M. West; M. Hartley	7.59	0.4493	3.861	15.35	8.2	3.44 km	JFC	–	MPC · JPL
124P/Mrkos	P/1991 F1; P/1995 S3	A. Mrkos	6.04	0.5039	3.316	31.53	16.4	2.73 km	JFC	–	MPC · JPL
125P/Spacewatch	P/1991 R2; P/1996 F1	Spacewatch	5.53	0.5120	3.126	9.99	12.6	0.83 km	JFC	–	MPC · JPL
126P/IRAS	P/1983 M1; P/1996 P1	IRAS	13.40	0.6958	5.643	45.84	12.6	1.57 km	JFC	–	MPC · JPL
127P/Holt–Olmstead	P/1990 R2; P/1996 S1	H. E. Holt; C. M. Olmstead	6.41	0.3607	3.451	14.30	10.5	0.62 km	JFC	–	MPC · JPL
128P/Shoemaker–Holt [list] (Shoemaker–Holt 1)	P/1987 U1; P/1996 S2	C. & E. Shoemaker; H. E. Holt	9.56	0.3220	4.505	4.36	6.8	2.63 km	JFC	–	MPC · JPL list
129P/Shoemaker–Levy (Shoemaker–Levy 3)	P/1991 C1; P/1996 U1	C. & E. Shoemaker; D. H. Levy	9.02	0.0970	4.332	3.44	14.3	1.65 km	ETC	–	MPC · JPL
130P/McNaught–Hughes	P/1991 S1; P/1997 H1	R. H. McNaught; S. Hughes	6.66	0.4075	3.541	7.31	13.0	2.67 km	JFC	–	MPC · JPL
131P/Mueller (Mueller 2)	P/1990 R1; P/1997 M2	J. E. Mueller	7.06	0.3430	3.680	7.36	8.6	0.87 km	JFC	–	MPC · JPL
132P/Helin–Roman–Alu (Helin–Roman–Alu 2)	P/1989 U1; P/1997 N2	E. F. Helin; P. Roman; J. T. Alu	7.66	0.5647	3.886	5.38	10.2	0.89 km	JFC	–	MPC · JPL
133P/Elst–Pizarro (7968 Elst–Pizarro)	P/1979 OW_{7}; P/1996 NU_{5}; P/1996 N2	E. W. Elst; G. Pizarro	5.63	0.1562	3.165	1.39	–	1.95 km	MBA-O	–	MPC · JPL
134P/Kowal–Vávrová	P/1983 J3; P/1997 X2	C. T. Kowal; Z. Vávrová	15.55	0.5872	6.229	4.35	5.3	1.5 km	JFC	–	MPC · JPL
135P/Shoemaker–Levy (Shoemaker–Levy 8)	P/1992 G2; P/1998 B1	C. & E. Shoemaker; D. H. Levy	7.49	0.2902	3.828	6.05	7.0	1.38 km	JFC	–	MPC · JPL
136P/Mueller (Mueller 3)	P/1990 S1; P/1998 K4	J. E. Mueller	8.61	0.2916	4.201	9.42	7.2	1.15 km	JFC	–	MPC · JPL
137P/Shoemaker–Levy (Shoemaker–Levy 2)	P/1990 UL_{3} P/1998 K6	C. & E. Shoemaker; D. H. Levy	9.60	0.5721	4.518	4.85	15.4	3.22 km	JFC	–	MPC · JPL
138P/Shoemaker–Levy (Shoemaker–Levy 7)	P/1991 V2; P/1998 O1	C. & E. Shoemaker; D. H. Levy	6.91	0.5295	3.628	10.08	16.7	0.8 km	JFC	–	MPC · JPL
139P/Väisälä–Oterma	D/1939 TN; P/1998 WG_{22}	Y. Väisälä; L. Oterma	9.62	0.2475	4.522	2.33	7.2	2.6 km	JFC	–	MPC · JPL
140P/Bowell–Skiff	P/1983 C1; P/1998 X2	E. Bowell; B. A. Skiff	16.18	0.6918	6.397	3.84	11.5	2.3 km	JFC	–	MPC · JPL
141P/Machholz [list] (Machholz 2)	P/1994 P1; P/1999 P1	D. E. Machholz	5.34	0.7367	3.055	13.98	17.3	0.25 km (A)	JFC	✓	MPC · JPL list
142P/Ge–Wang	P/1988 V1; P/1999 R2	Y. Ge; Q. Wang	11.09	0.4997	4.973	12.31	10.1	1.355 km	JFC	–	MPC · JPL
143P/Kowal–Mrkos	D/1984 H1; D/1984 JD; P/2000 ET_{90}	C. T. Kowal; A. Mrkos	8.91	0.4088	4.298	4.69	14.5	5.7 km	JFC	–	MPC · JPL
144P/Kushida	P/1994 A1; P/2000 O2	Y. Kushida	7.58	0.6304	3.858	4.13	8.6	1.2 km	JFC	–	MPC · JPL
145P/Shoemaker–Levy (Shoemaker–Levy 5)	P/1991 T1; P/2000 R1	C. & E. Shoemaker; D. H. Levy	8.43	0.5410	4.143	11.26	13.4	1.89 km	JFC	–	MPC · JPL
146P/Shoemaker–LINEAR	P/1984 W1; P/2000 S2	C. & E. Shoemaker; LINEAR	8.11	0.6467	4.036	23.09	13.5	0.93 km	JFC	–	MPC · JPL
147P/Kushida–Muramatsu	P/1993 X1; P/2000 T2	Y. Kushida; O. Muramatsu	7.43	0.2760	3.807	2.37	4.5	0.22 km	ETC	–	MPC · JPL
148P/Anderson–LINEAR	P/1963 W1; P/2000 SO_{253}	J. Anderson; LINEAR	7.05	0.5393	3.678	3.68	13.0	2.1 km	JFC	–	MPC · JPL
149P/Mueller (Mueller 4)	P/1992 G3	J. E. Mueller	9.00	0.3883	4.326	29.75	15.5	1.4 km	JFC	–	MPC · JPL
150P/LONEOS	P/2000 WT_{168}	LONEOS	7.67	0.5453	3.889	18.50	15.6	5.6 km	JFC	–	MPC · JPL
151P/Helin	P/1987 Q3; P/2001 M1	E. F. Helin	13.99	0.5709	5.807	4.73	8.5	4.2 km	JFC	–	MPC · JPL
152P/Helin–Lawrence	P/1993 K2; P/2001 Y1	E. F. Helin; K. J. Lawrence	9.53	0.3070	4.495	9.87	12.6	2.3 km	JFC	–	MPC · JPL
153P/Ikeya–Zhang	X/877 L1; X/1273 G1; C/1661 C1; C/2002 C1	K. Ikeya; D. Zhang	365.50	0.9901	51.119	28.12	4.0	2.545 km	LPC	–	MPC · JPL
154P/Brewington	P/1992 Q1; P/2002 Q4	H. Brewington	10.79	0.6707	4.883	17.83	10.8	1.5 km	JFC	–	MPC · JPL
155P/Shoemaker (Shoemaker 3)	P/1986 A1; P/2002 R2	C. & E. Shoemaker	16.93	0.7261	6.594	6.40	10.0	1.51 km	JFC	–	MPC · JPL
156P/Russell–LINEAR	P/1986 R1; P/1993 WU; P/2000 QD_{181}; P/2000 XV_{43}	K. S. Russell; LINEAR	6.44	0.6149	3.462	17.26	12.7	2.0 km	JFC	–	MPC · JPL
157P/Tritton	D/1978 C2; P/2003 T1	K. Tritton	6.17	0.6285	3.365	11.00	15.2	1.6 km	JFC	–	MPC · JPL
158P/Kowal–LINEAR	P/1979 O1; P/2001 RG_{100}	C. T. Kowal; LINEAR	10.26	0.0303	4.720	7.91	7.0	5.42 km	JFC	–	MPC · JPL
159P/LONEOS	P/2003 UD_{16}	LONEOS	14.19	0.3821	5.860	23.46	12.9	2.9 km	JFC	–	MPC · JPL
160P/LINEAR	P/2004 NL_{21}	LINEAR	7.90	0.4791	3.967	17.28	6.7	0.87 km	JFC	–	MPC · JPL
161P/Hartley–IRAS	P/1983 V1; P/2004 V2	M. Hartley; IRAS	21.49	0.8351	7.730	95.70	11.5		HTC	✓	MPC · JPL
162P/Siding Spring	P/2004 TU_{12}	Siding Spring	5.33	0.5961	3.053	27.82	15.2	6.03 km	JFC	✓	MPC · JPL
163P/NEAT	P/2004 V4	NEAT	7.06	0.4760	3.680	12.50	11.8	1.39 km	JFC	–	MPC · JPL
164P/Christensen	P/2004 Y1	E. J. Christensen	7.00	0.5403	3.658	16.26	14.3	1.945 km	JFC	–	MPC · JPL
165P/LINEAR	P/2000 B4	LINEAR	76.69	0.6216	18.050	15.91	5.9		CTC	–	MPC · JPL
166P/NEAT	P/2001 T4	NEAT	51.73	0.3831	13.883	15.37	7.0	14.32 km	CTC	–	MPC · JPL
167P/CINEOS	P/2004 PY_{42}	CINEOS	64.86	0.2700	16.142	19.13	–	33.09 km	CTC	–	MPC · JPL
168P/Hergenrother	P/1998 W2; P/2005 N2	C. W. Hergenrother	6.90	0.6095	3.624	21.93	7.0	0.48 km	JFC	–	MPC · JPL
169P/NEAT	P/2002 EX_{12}	NEAT	4.21	0.7668	2.606	11.30	16.8	2.48 km	JFC	✓	MPC · JPL
170P/Christensen	P/2005 M1	E. J. Christensen	8.60	0.3034	4.198	10.12	6.4	11.885 km	JFC	–	MPC · JPL
171P/Spahr	P/1998 W1; P/2005 R3	T. B. Spahr	6.71	0.5020	3.557	21.94	12.2	1.25 km	JFC	–	MPC · JPL
172P/Yeung	P/2001 CB_{40} P/2002 BV	W. K. Y. Yeung	6.73	0.3713	3.563	12.69	14.8	5.6 km	JFC	–	MPC · JPL
173P/Mueller (Mueller 5)	P/1993 W1; P/2005 T1	J. E. Mueller	13.58	0.2614	5.691	16.51	12.1	2.1 km	JFC	–	MPC · JPL
174P/Echeclus (60558 Echeclus)	P/2000 EC_{98} P/2002 GJ_{27}	Spacewatch	35.25	0.4565	10.751	4.34	–	30 km	CEN	–	MPC · JPL
175P/Hergenrother	P/2000 C1; P/2006 A3	C. W. Hergenrother	6.52	0.4222	3.489	6.09	9.7		JFC	–	MPC · JPL
176P/LINEAR (118401 LINEAR)	P/1999 RE_{70} P/2001 AR_{7}	LINEAR	5.71	0.1924	3.195	0.23	–	2.0 km	MBA-O	–	MPC · JPL
177P/Barnard	D/1889 M1; P/2006 M3	E. E. Barnard	119.82	0.9544	24.305	31.22	15.7		HTC	✓	MPC · JPL
178P/Hug–Bell	P/1999 X1; P/2006 O1	G. Hug; G. Bell	7.03	0.4730	3.669	10.98	13.6	1.77 km	JFC	–	MPC · JPL
179P/Jedicke	P/1995 A1; P/2006 U2	R. Jedicke	14.46	0.3075	5.935	19.85	6.9	2.48 km	JFC	–	MPC · JPL
180P/NEAT	P/2001 K1; P/2006 U3	NEAT	7.58	0.3549	3.859	16.87	7.1		JFC	–	MPC · JPL
181P/Shoemaker–Levy (Shoemaker–Levy 6)	P/1991 V1; P/2006 U4	C. & E. Shoemaker; D. H. Levy	7.52	0.7073	3.839	16.98	16.3		JFC	✓	MPC · JPL
182P/LONEOS	P/2001 WF_{2} P/2006 W2	LONEOS	5.02	0.6663	2.931	16.91	20.8	0.38 km	JFC	✓	MPC · JPL
183P/Korlević–Jurić	P/1999 DN_{3} P/2006 Y1	K. Korlević; M. Jurić	9.53	0.1350	4.494	18.74	13.1	10.6 km	JFC	–	MPC · JPL
184P/Lovas (Lovas 2)	P/1986 W1; P/2007 A1	M. Lovas	6.61	0.6043	3.522	1.55	18.4	0.6 km	JFC	–	MPC · JPL
185P/Petriew	P/2001 Q2; P/2007 A3	V. Petriew	5.46	0.6989	3.100	14.00	13.6	5.7 km	JFC	✓	MPC · JPL
186P/Garradd	P/1977 O1; P/2007 B3	G. J. Garradd	11.01	0.1268	4.950	28.54	6.5		JFC	–	MPC · JPL
187P/LINEAR	P/1999 J5; P/2007 E3	LINEAR	9.53	0.1732	4.494	13.66	7.3		JFC	–	MPC · JPL
188P/LINEAR–Mueller	P/1998 S1; P/2007 J7	LINEAR; J. E. Mueller	9.18	0.4149	4.384	10.51	14.3	3.925 km	JFC	–	MPC · JPL
189P/NEAT	P/2002 O5; P/2007 N2	NEAT	4.98	0.5976	2.918	20.40	19.1	0.064 km	JFC	✓	MPC · JPL
190P/Mueller	P/1998 U2; P/2007 O2	J. E. Mueller	8.73	0.5207	4.240	2.19	13.7		JFC	–	MPC · JPL
191P/McNaught	P/2000 P3; P/2007 N1	R. H. McNaught	6.64	0.4207	3.533	8.76	13.9		JFC	–	MPC · JPL
192P/Shoemaker–Levy (Shoemaker–Levy 1)	P/1990 V1; P/2007 T3	C. & E. Shoemaker; D. H. Levy	16.44	0.7741	6.465	24.57	12.1		JFC	–	MPC · JPL
193P/LINEAR–NEAT	P/2001 Q5; P/2007 U2	LINEAR; NEAT	6.76	0.3942	3.576	10.69	8.1		JFC	–	MPC · JPL
194P/LINEAR	P/2000 B3; P/2007 W2	LINEAR	8.00	0.5757	4.001	11.14	17.7		JFC	–	MPC · JPL
195P/Hill	P/1993 D1; P/2006 W4	R. E. Hill	16.49	0.3148	6.477	36.36	4.5	3.875 km	JFC	–	MPC · JPL
196P/Tichý	P/2000 U6; P/2008 C2	M. Tichý	7.33	0.4344	3.775	19.38	15.3		JFC	–	MPC · JPL
197P/LINEAR	P/2003 KV_{2} P/2008 E2	LINEAR	4.86	0.6299	2.867	25.56	18.2	0.73 km	JFC	✓	MPC · JPL
198P/ODAS	P/1998 X1; P/2006 B7	ODAS	6.78	0.4477	3.583	1.35	15.8		JFC	–	MPC · JPL
199P/Shoemaker (Shoemaker 4)	P/1994 J3; P/2008 G2	C. & E. Shoemaker	14.54	0.5080	5.957	24.74	7.1	3.3 km	JFC	–	MPC · JPL
200P/Larsen	P/1997 V1; P/2008 L1	J. A. Larsen	10.87	0.3332	4.908	12.12	7.0	3.6 km	JFC	–	MPC · JPL
Comet designation	MPC designations	Discoverer(s) or namesake(s)	Period (years)	e	a (AU)	i (°)	Abs. mag (M1)	Nucleus radii	Class	NEC	Ref

back to top

=== 201 to 300 ===
Comet designation	MPC designations	Discoverer(s) or namesake(s)	Period (years)	e	a (AU)	i (°)	Abs. mag (M1)	Nucleus radii	Class	NEC	Ref
201P/LONEOS	P/2001 R1; P/2008 Q4	LONEOS	6.44	0.6129	3.461	7.04	13.0	1.725 km	JFC	–	MPC · JPL
202P/Scotti	P/2001 X2; P/2008 R2	J. V. Scotti	7.33	0.3303	3.773	2.19	16.2		JFC	–	MPC · JPL
203P/Korlević	P/1999 WJ_{7} P/2008 R4	K. Korlević	10.04	0.3160	4.654	2.97	13.0	1.6 km	JFC	–	MPC · JPL
204P/LINEAR–NEAT	P/2001 TU_{80} P/2008 R5	LINEAR; NEAT	6.99	0.4722	3.656	6.59	15.2	3.2 km	JFC	–	MPC · JPL
205P/Giacobini [list]	D/1896 R2; P/2008 R6	M. Giacobini	6.68	0.5669	3.547	15.29	14.0		JFC	–	MPC · JPL list
206P/Barnard–Boattini	D/1892 T1; P/2008 T3	E. E. Barnard; A. Boattini	5.81	0.6485	3.234	33.20	20.3		JFC	✓	MPC · JPL
207P/NEAT	P/2001 J1; P/2008 T5	NEAT	7.65	0.7572	3.883	10.15	16.5	0.69 km	JFC	✓	MPC · JPL
208P/McMillan	P/2000 S7; P/2008 U1	R. S. McMillan	8.13	0.3742	4.042	4.41	16.0		JFC	–	MPC · JPL
209P/LINEAR	P/2004 CB; P/2008 X2	LINEAR	5.03	0.6889	2.937	20.98	18.1	1.95 km	JFC	✓	MPC · JPL
210P/Christensen	P/2003 K2; P/2008 X4	E. J. Christensen	5.66	0.8317	3.176	10.22	14.9	0.87 km	JFC	✓	MPC · JPL
211P/Hill	P/2003 F6; P/2008 X1	R. E. Hill	6.72	0.3392	3.559	18.89	7.8	1.795 km	JFC	–	MPC · JPL
212P/NEAT	P/2000 YN_{30}	NEAT	7.79	0.5789	3.929	22.40	18.0	0.85 km	JFC	–	MPC · JPL
213P/Van Ness [list]	P/2005 R2; P/2009 B3	M. E. Van Ness	6.12	0.4075	3.347	10.38	11.4	1.53 km	JFC	–	MPC · JPL list
214P/LINEAR	P/2002 CW_{134} P/2009 B4	LINEAR	6.84	0.4896	3.604	15.23	12.1	1.6 km	JFC	–	MPC · JPL
215P/NEAT	P/2002 O8; P/2009 B5	NEAT	9.00	0.2012	4.326	10.06	12.1	1.825 km	JFC	–	MPC · JPL
216P/LINEAR	P/2001 CV_{8} P/2009 D1	LINEAR	7.65	0.4452	3.884	9.04	5.1	0.6 km	JFC	–	MPC · JPL
217P/LINEAR	P/2001 MD_{7} P/2009 F3	LINEAR	7.83	0.6896	3.944	12.88	14.0	2.1 km	JFC	✓	MPC · JPL
218P/LINEAR	P/2003 H4; P/2009 F7	LINEAR	6.11	0.4911	3.342	18.17	15.5		JFC	–	MPC · JPL
219P/LINEAR	P/2002 LZ_{11} P/2009 H1	LINEAR	6.97	0.3520	3.650	11.53	8.7	0.95 km	JFC	–	MPC · JPL
220P/McNaught	P/2004 K2; P/2009 H2	R. H. McNaught	5.49	0.5022	3.113	8.13	15.7	1.315 km	JFC	–	MPC · JPL
221P/LINEAR	P/2002 JN_{16} P/2009 L1	LINEAR	6.47	0.4876	3.473	11.43	14.0	1.0 km	JFC	–	MPC · JPL
222P/LINEAR	P/2004 X1; P/2009 MB_{9}	LINEAR	4.83	0.7268	2.857	5.15	19.3	0.61 km	JFC	✓	MPC · JPL
223P/Skiff	P/2002 S1; P/2009 L_{18}	B. A. Skiff	8.45	0.4164	4.148	27.05	15.5	1.545 km	JFC	–	MPC · JPL
224P/LINEAR–NEAT	P/2003 XD_{10} P/2009 Q2	LINEAR; NEAT	6.15	0.4376	3.356	14.81	13.1		JFC	–	MPC · JPL
225P/LINEAR	P/2002 T1; P/2009 Q3	LINEAR	6.99	0.6375	3.654	21.33	19.0	1.1 km	JFC	–	MPC · JPL
226P/Pigott–LINEAR–Kowalski	D/1783 W1; P/2003 A1; P/2009 R2	E. Pigott; LINEAR; R. A. Kowalski	7.32	0.5289	3.771	44.00	11.8	1.075 km	JFC	–	MPC · JPL
227P/Catalina–LINEAR	P/2004 EW_{38} P/2009 S4	CSS; LINEAR	6.80	0.4996	3.588	6.52	17.2	1.365 km	JFC	–	MPC · JPL
228P/LINEAR	P/2001 YX_{127} P/2009 U2	LINEAR	8.51	0.1769	4.168	7.92	9.4	2.41 km	JFC	–	MPC · JPL
229P/Gibbs	P/2001 Q_{10} P/2009 S1	A. R. Gibbs	7.79	0.3771	3.930	26.08	14.1	1.255 km	JFC	–	MPC · JPL
230P/LINEAR	P/1997 A2; P/2002 Q_{15}; P/2009 U6	LINEAR	6.27	0.5631	3.400	14.65	15.6	1.93 km	JFC	–	MPC · JPL
231P/LINEAR–NEAT	P/2003 CP_{7} P/2009 X1	LINEAR; NEAT	8.08	0.2468	4.026	12.33	7.1		JFC	–	MPC · JPL
232P/Hill	P/1999 XO_{188} P/2009 W1	R. E. Hill	9.50	0.3349	4.485	14.64	7.2	1.525 km	JFC	–	MPC · JPL
233P/La Sagra	P/2005 JR_{71} P/2009 WJ_{50}	LSSS	5.28	0.4106	3.034	11.28	18.7	0.54 km	ETC	–	MPC · JPL
234P/LINEAR	P/2002 CF_{140} P/2010 E4	LINEAR	7.47	0.2512	3.820	11.51	7.4	1.2 km	JFC	–	MPC · JPL
235P/LINEAR	P/2002 FA_{9} P/2010 F2	LINEAR	8.01	0.3134	4.002	8.89	7.3	1.11 km	JFC	–	MPC · JPL
236P/LINEAR	P/2003 UY_{275} P/2010 K1	LINEAR	7.20	0.5086	3.728	16.33	14.9	0.53 km	JFC	–	MPC · JPL
237P/LINEAR	P/2002 LN_{13} P/2010 L2	LINEAR	6.58	0.4344	3.512	14.02	6.4	1.03 km	JFC	–	MPC · JPL
238P/Read	P/2005 U1; P/2010 N2	M. T. Read	5.63	0.2517	3.166	1.26	8.3	0.3 km	ETC	–	MPC · JPL
239P/LINEAR	P/1999 XB_{69} P/2010 C2	LINEAR	9.45	0.6314	4.470	11.31	15.3	1.48 km	JFC	–	MPC · JPL
240P/NEAT [list]	P/2002 X2; P/2010 P1	NEAT	7.61	0.4498	3.868	23.52	11.8	2.665 km	JFC	–	MPC · JPL
241P/LINEAR	P/1999 U3; P/2010 P2	LINEAR	11.03	0.6099	4.954	20.87	14.3	3.06 km	JFC	–	MPC · JPL
242P/Spahr	P/1998 U4; P/2010 P3	T. B. Spahr	13.02	0.2808	5.534	32.51	6.8		JFC	–	MPC · JPL
243P/NEAT	P/2003 S2; P/2010 P5	NEAT	7.51	0.3597	3.836	7.63	10.4	0.81–1.55 km	JFC	–	MPC · JPL
244P/Scotti	P/2000 Y3; P/2010 Q1	J. V. Scotti	10.82	0.1990	4.892	2.26	7.0	1.8 km	JFC	–	MPC · JPL
245P/WISE	P/2002 Q_{16} P/2010 L1	WISE	8.02	0.4661	4.008	21.09	17.4	0.75 km	JFC	–	MPC · JPL
246P/NEAT	P/2004 F3; P/2010 V2	NEAT	8.08	0.2851	4.028	15.97	6.1	1.01 km	JFC	–	MPC · JPL
247P/LINEAR	P/2002 VP_{94} P/2010 V3	LINEAR	7.90	0.6256	3.965	13.68	17.9	1.595 km	JFC	–	MPC · JPL
248P/Gibbs	P/1996 TT_{65}; P/2010 MS_{75}; P/2010 RN_{141}; P/2010 RR_{59}; P/2010 SQ_{31}; P/2010 TL_{69}; P/2010 W1	A. R. Gibbs	14.63	0.6412	5.982	6.37	16.0	0.9 km	JFC	–	MPC · JPL
249P/LINEAR	P/2006 U1; P/2011 A4	LINEAR	4.61	0.8187	2.770	8.40	18.4	1.2 km	JFC	✓	MPC · JPL
250P/Larson	P/2011 A1	S. M. Larson	7.21	0.4074	3.733	13.30	15.6		JFC	–	MPC · JPL
251P/LINEAR	P/2004 HC_{18} P/2011 J1	LINEAR	6.52	0.5098	3.491	23.51	9.5	0.97 km	JFC	–	MPC · JPL
252P/LINEAR	P/2000 G1; P/2011 L5	LINEAR	5.32	0.6731	3.047	10.42	16.4	0.3 km	JFC	✓	MPC · JPL
253P/PanSTARRS	P/1998 RS_{22} P/2011 R2	Pan-STARRS	6.47	0.4126	3.472	4.94	13.5		JFC	–	MPC · JPL
254P/McNaught	P/2010 T1	R. H. McNaught	9.92	0.3206	4.617	32.57	12.8	4.0 km	JFC	–	MPC · JPL
255P/Levy	P/2006 T1; P/2011 Y1	D. H. Levy	5.26	0.6720	3.025	18.33	11.5		JFC	✓	MPC · JPL
256P/LINEAR	P/2003 HT_{15} P/2012 B2	LINEAR	9.97	0.4193	4.631	27.63	12.0	0.8 km	JFC	–	MPC · JPL
257P/Catalina	P/2005 JY_{126} P/2012 F4	CSS	7.27	0.4324	3.754	20.24	15.1	1.305 km	JFC	–	MPC · JPL
258P/PanSTARRS	P/2012 H1	Pan-STARRS	9.24	0.2104	4.405	6.75	16.3		JFC	–	MPC · JPL
259P/Garradd	P/2008 R1	G. J. Garradd	4.50	0.3415	2.727	15.90	13.7	0.32 km	ETC	–	MPC · JPL
260P/McNaught	P/2005 K3; P/2012 K2	R. H. McNaught	7.05	0.5943	3.676	15.77	12.7	1.54 km	JFC	–	MPC · JPL
261P/Larson	P/2005 N3; P/2012 K4	S. M. Larson	6.81	0.3919	3.592	6.34	7.4	3.345 km	JFC	–	MPC · JPL
262P/McNaught–Russell	P/1994 X1; P/2012 K7	R. H. McNaught; K. S. Russell	18.26	0.8154	6.935	29.08	14.7		JFC	✓	MPC · JPL
263P/Gibbs	P/2006 Y2; P/2012 K9	A. R. Gibbs	5.35	0.5877	3.061	11.54	18.6	1.255 km	JFC	✓	MPC · JPL
264P/Larsen	P/2004 H3; P/2012 L4	J. A. Larsen	7.68	0.3737	3.893	25.15	16.7	0.69 km	JFC	–	MPC · JPL
265P/LINEAR	P/2003 O2; P/2012 M1	LINEAR	8.77	0.6460	4.253	14.69	14.9		JFC	–	MPC · JPL
266P/Christensen	P/2006 U5; P/2012 P1	E. J. Christensen	6.64	0.3396	3.532	3.43	11.0	1.66 km	ETC	–	MPC · JPL
267P/LONEOS	P/2006 Q2; P/2012 R1	LONEOS	5.97	0.5934	3.290	5.37	20.5		JFC	–	MPC · JPL
268P/Bernardi	P/2005 V1; P/2012 P2	F. Bernardi	9.61	0.4802	4.521	15.66	16.5		JFC	–	MPC · JPL
269P/Jedicke	P/1996 A1; P/2012 R2	R. Jedicke	19.37	0.4347	7.212	6.61	6.7	5.0 km	JFC	–	MPC · JPL
270P/Gehrels	P/1997 C1; P/2012 S5	T. Gehrels	17.54	0.4676	6.752	2.86	13.7	2.3 km	JFC	–	MPC · JPL
271P/van Houten–Lemmon	D/1960 S1; P/2012 TB_{36}	C. & I. van Houten; MLS	18.42	0.3907	6.974	6.86	7.2	14.8 km	JFC	–	MPC · JPL
272P/NEAT	P/2004 F1; P/2012 V3	NEAT	9.37	0.4565	4.446	18.19	10.7		JFC	–	MPC · JPL
273P/Pons–Gambart	D/1827 M1; P/2012 V4	J.-L. Pons; J.-F. Gambart	188.13	0.9753	32.832	136.40	11.3		HTC	✓	MPC · JPL
274P/Tombaugh–Tenagra	D/1931 AN; P/2003 WZ_{141}; P/2012 WX_{32}	C. Tombaugh; Tenagra II	9.12	0.4397	4.364	15.83	11.1		JFC	–	MPC · JPL
275P/Hermann	P/1999 D1; P/2012 Y2	S. M. Hermann	13.84	0.7139	5.765	21.57	15.5	0.7 km	JFC	–	MPC · JPL
276P/Vorobjov	P/2012 T7	T. Vorobjov	12.22	0.2764	5.306	14.82	13.8		JFC	–	MPC · JPL
277P/LINEAR	P/2005 YQ_{127} P/2013 A3	LINEAR	7.58	0.5038	3.858	16.75	11.8	2.4 km	JFC	–	MPC · JPL
278P/McNaught	P/2006 K2; P/2013 B1	R. H. McNaught	7.12	0.4334	3.700	6.68	12.6	3.155 km	JFC	–	MPC · JPL
279P/La Sagra	P/2009 QG_{31}	LSSS	6.76	0.3985	3.574	5.05	17.4		JFC	–	MPC · JPL
280P/Larsen	P/2004 H2; P/2013 C1	J. A. Larsen	9.59	0.4178	4.513	11.78	15.1	1.23 km	JFC	–	MPC · JPL
281P/MOSS	P/2013 CE_{31}	MOSS	10.70	0.1734	4.856	4.72	14.8		JFC	–	MPC · JPL
282P/2003 BM80 (unnamed) = (323137) 2003 BM80	P/2003 BM_{80} P/2003 FV_{112}	LONEOS	8.72	0.1878	4.238	5.81	–	1.7 km	MBA-O	–	MPC · JPL
283P/Spacewatch	P/2013 EV_{9}	Spacewatch	8.41	0.4857	4.134	14.46	16.7		JFC	–	MPC · JPL
284P/McNaught	P/2007 H1; P/2013 J1	R. H. McNaught	7.04	0.3757	3.672	11.86	9.1	2.33 km	JFC	–	MPC · JPL
285P/LINEAR	P/2003 U2; P/2013 K2	LINEAR	9.58	0.6179	4.509	25.02	13.6		JFC	–	MPC · JPL
286P/Christensen	P/2005 L4; P/2013 K3	E. J. Christensen	8.35	0.4241	4.116	17.04	16.0	1.5 km	JFC	–	MPC · JPL
287P/Christensen	P/2006 R2; P/2013 L1	E. J. Christensen	8.54	0.2692	4.179	16.30	8.9		JFC	–	MPC · JPL
288P/2006 VW139 (unnamed) = (300163) 2006 VW139	P/2006 VW_{139}	Spacewatch	5.32	0.2004	3.048	3.24	–	0.86 km	MBA-O	–	MPC · JPL
289P/Blanpain	D/1819 W1; P/2003 WY_{25}	J.-J. Blanpain	5.31	0.6851	3.045	5.90	22.1	0.16 km	JFC	✓	MPC · JPL
290P/Jäger	P/1998 U3; P/2013 N1	M. Jäger	15.08	0.6470	6.103	19.07	9.7	7.22 km	JFC	–	MPC · JPL
291P/NEAT	P/2003 S1; P/2013 N2	NEAT	9.71	0.4304	4.552	5.96	8.3	2.2 km	JFC	–	MPC · JPL
292P/Li	P/1998 Y2; P/2013 O1	W. Li	15.20	0.5868	6.135	24.32	9.5	6.17 km	JFC	–	MPC · JPL
293P/Spacewatch	P/2006 XG_{16} P/2013 R2	Spacewatch	6.94	0.4197	3.639	9.06	15.8	1.7 km	JFC	–	MPC · JPL
294P/LINEAR	P/2008 A2; P/2013 X2	LINEAR	5.71	0.5986	3.194	18.54	17.9		JFC	✓	MPC · JPL
295P/LINEAR	P/2002 AR_{2} P/2013 Y1	LINEAR	12.36	0.6147	5.345	21.10	13.4	2.3 km	JFC	–	MPC · JPL
296P/Garradd	P/2007 H3; P/2014 A1	G. J. Garradd	6.56	0.4773	3.503	25.20	12.8	1.105 km	JFC	–	MPC · JPL
297P/Beshore	P/2008 J2; P/2014 D1	E. Beshore	6.50	0.3086	3.484	10.26	6.7	0.5 km	ETC	–	MPC · JPL
298P/Christensen	P/2007 C1; P/2014 C4	E. J. Christensen	6.52	0.4125	3.490	8.02	16.1		JFC	–	MPC · JPL
299P/Catalina–PanSTARRS	P/2005 EL_{284} P/2014 D2	CSS; Pan-STARRS	9.16	0.2827	4.377	10.48	6.3	17.19 km	JFC	–	MPC · JPL
300P/Catalina	P/2005 JQ_{5} P/2014 G2	CSS	4.43	0.6917	2.699	5.68	16.8	0.7 km	JFC	✓	MPC · JPL
Comet designation	MPC designations	Discoverer(s) or namesake(s)	Period (years)	e	a (AU)	i (°)	Abs. mag (M1)	Nucleus radii	Class	NEC	Ref

back to top

=== 301 to 400 ===
Comet designation	MPC designations	Discoverer(s) or namesake(s)	Period (years)	e	a (AU)	i (°)	Abs. mag (M1)	Nucleus radii	Class	NEC	Ref
301P/LINEAR–NEAT	P/2001 BB_{50} P/2014 K1	LINEAR; NEAT	13.56	0.5874	5.687	10.62	10.9		JFC	–	MPC · JPL
302P/Lemmon–PanSTARRS	P/2007 RJ_{236} P/2014 K2	MLS; Pan-STARRS	8.86	0.2287	4.281	6.03	11.1		JFC	–	MPC · JPL
303P/NEAT	P/2003 U3; P/2014 L1	NEAT	11.43	0.5104	5.075	7.07	16.2		JFC	–	MPC · JPL
304P/Ory	P/2008 Q2; P/2014 L4	M. Ory	5.84	0.5742	3.244	2.76	15.1		JFC	–	MPC · JPL
305P/Skiff	P/2004 V1; P/2014 N1	B. A. Skiff	9.93	0.6961	4.621	11.52	16.4	1.01 km	JFC	–	MPC · JPL
306P/LINEAR	P/2003 O3; P/2014 M5	LINEAR	5.47	0.5983	3.104	8.36	19.4	0.6 km	JFC	✓	MPC · JPL
307P/LINEAR	P/2000 QJ_{46} P/2014 O1	LINEAR	13.99	0.6747	5.807	4.42	13.1	1.2 km	JFC	–	MPC · JPL
308P/Lagerkvist–Carsenty	P/1997 T3; P/2014 O2; P/2014 QD_{604}	C.-I. Lagerkvist; U. Carsenty	17.24	0.3623	6.674	4.84	14.1		JFC	–	MPC · JPL
309P/LINEAR	P/2005 Q4; P/2014 Q4	LINEAR	9.39	0.6070	4.450	17.66	15.8	1.5 km	JFC	–	MPC · JPL
310P/Hill	P/2006 S6; P/2014 Q5	R. E. Hill	8.49	0.4260	4.163	13.19	12.5		JFC	–	MPC · JPL
311P/PanSTARRS	P/2013 P5	Pan-STARRS	3.24	0.1158	2.189	4.97	18.9	0.24 km	ETC	–	MPC · JPL
312P/NEAT	P/2001 Q_{11} P/2014 R2	NEAT	6.43	0.4301	3.459	19.79	16.9	1.535 km	JFC	–	MPC · JPL
313P/Gibbs	P/2003 S_{10} P/2014 S4	A. R. Gibbs	5.60	0.2417	3.154	10.97	16.7	0.85 km	ETC	–	MPC · JPL
314P/Montani	P/1997 G1; P/2014 U1	J. Montani	19.62	0.4160	7.275	3.98	12.6	2.5 km	JFC	–	MPC · JPL
315P/LONEOS	P/2004 VR_{8} P/2013 V6	LONEOS	11.26	0.5163	5.023	17.91	10.4	1.124 km	JFC	–	MPC · JPL
316P/LONEOS–Christensen	P/2005 RV_{25} P/2014 U5	LONEOS; E. J. Christensen	9.00	0.1665	4.328	9.88	14.4	8.0 km	JFC	–	MPC · JPL
317P/WISE	P/2010 K2; P/2015 B3	WISE	5.08	0.5802	2.957	11.96	19.5	0.37 km	JFC	✓	MPC · JPL
318P/McNaught–Hartley	P/1994 N2; P/2014 M6	R. H. McNaught; M. Hartley	20.66	0.6752	7.530	17.89	9.6	5.36 km	JFC	–	MPC · JPL
319P/Catalina–McNaught	P/2008 JK; P/2008 S1; P/2015 G1	CSS; R. H. McNaught	6.75	0.6650	3.573	15.07	17.0	1.0 km	JFC	✓	MPC · JPL
320P/McNaught	P/2004 R1; P/2015 HC_{10}	R. H.McNaught	5.47	0.6824	3.103	4.89	19.6	0.105 km	JFC	✓	MPC · JPL
321P/SOHO	P/1997 J6; P/2001 D1; P/2004 X7; P/2008 S2; P/2012 M2	SOHO	3.78	0.9807	2.427	19.74	–		JFC	✓	MPC · JPL
322P/SOHO	P/1999 R1; P/2003 R5; P/2007 R5; P/2011 R4	SOHO	3.99	0.9787	2.516	12.59	19.0	0.075 km	JFC	✓	MPC · JPL
323P/SOHO	P/1999 X3; P/2004 E2; P/2008 K_{10}; P/2012 Q2	SOHO	4.15	0.9848	2.582	5.37	23.6	0.086 km	JFC	✓	MPC · JPL
324P/La Sagra	P/2010 R2; P/2015 K3	LSSS	5.44	0.1538	3.094	21.42	7.5	0.59 km	ETC	–	MPC · JPL
325P/Yang–Gao	X/1951 K1; P/2009 L2; P/2015 J4	R. Yang; X. Gao	6.29	0.6241	3.406	16.32	15.5	0.705 km	JFC	✓	MPC · JPL
326P/Hill	P/2007 V2; P/2015 P1	R. E. Hill	8.22	0.3174	4.072	2.47	15.5		JFC	–	MPC · JPL
327P/Van Ness	P/2002 Q1; P/2015 P2	M. E. Van Ness	6.73	0.5628	3.563	36.24	14.8	0.825 km	JFC	–	MPC · JPL
328P/LONEOS–Tucker	P/1998 QP_{54} P/2015 S1	LONEOS; R. A. Tucker	8.59	0.5519	4.195	17.71	7.1	2.7 km	JFC	–	MPC · JPL
329P/LINEAR–Catalina	P/2003 WC_{7} P/2015 T1	LINEAR; CSS	11.82	0.6801	5.189	21.47	8.9	2.0 km	JFC	–	MPC · JPL
330P/Catalina	P/1999 V1; P/2015 U1	CSS	16.92	0.5493	6.590	15.55	10.1	3.23 km	JFC	–	MPC · JPL
331P/Gibbs	P/2012 F5	A. R. Gibbs	5.21	0.0416	3.005	9.74	16.6	0.885 km	ETC	–	MPC · JPL
332P/Ikeya–Murakami [list]	P/2010 V1; P/2015 Y2	K. Ikeya; S. Murakami	5.42	0.4886	3.087	9.38	5.2	0.275 km	ETC	–	MPC · JPL list
333P/LINEAR	P/2007 VA_{85}	LINEAR	8.68	0.7359	4.224	131.88	15.0	3.04 km	JFC	✓	MPC · JPL
334P/NEAT	P/2001 F1; P/2016 A4	NEAT	16.53	0.3545	6.488	19.06	6.5		JFC	–	MPC · JPL
335P/Gibbs	P/2008 Y2; P/2016 A9	A. R. Gibbs	6.80	0.5435	3.588	7.28	17.0		JFC	–	MPC · JPL
336P/McNaught	P/2006 G1; P/2016 B2	R. H. McNaught	10.56	0.4529	4.813	18.56	8.2		JFC	–	MPC · JPL
337P/WISE	P/2010 N1; P/2016 GE_{216}	WISE	5.96	0.4969	3.288	15.37	15.1	0.43 km	JFC	–	MPC · JPL
338P/McNaught	P/2008 J3; P/2016 N1	R. H. McNaught	7.70	0.4112	3.900	25.37	14.9	1.015 km	JFC	–	MPC · JPL
339P/Gibbs	P/2009 K1; P/2016 M2	A. R. Gibbs	7.05	0.6398	3.676	5.75	12.3		JFC	–	MPC · JPL
340P/Boattini	P/2008 T1; P/2016 N2	A. Boattini	8.72	0.2809	4.237	2.08	15.2		JFC	–	MPC · JPL
341P/Gibbs	P/2007 R3; P/2016 N3	A. R. Gibbs	8.89	0.4145	4.293	3.80	15.5		JFC	–	MPC · JPL
342P/SOHO	P/2000 O3; P/2005 W4; P/2011 E1; P/2016 N5	SOHO	5.31	0.9826	3.043	13.27	–		JFC	✓	MPC · JPL
343P/NEAT–LONEOS	P/2003 SQ_{215} P/2016 P3	NEAT; LONEOS	12.81	0.5842	5.475	5.58	6.0	4.3 km	JFC	–	MPC · JPL
344P/Read	P/2005 S3; P/2016 Q1	M. T. Read	10.80	0.4220	4.887	3.48	5.3	1.41 km	JFC	–	MPC · JPL
345P/LINEAR	P/2008 SH_{164} P/2016 Q3	LINEAR	8.13	0.2194	4.043	2.72	12.4		ETC	–	MPC · JPL
346P/Catalina	P/2007 T6; P/2007 TU_{149}; P/2016 R1	CSS	9.49	0.5039	4.482	22.17	13.9	1.645 km	JFC	–	MPC · JPL
347P/PanSTARRS	P/2009 Q9; P/2016 SV	Pan-STARRS	6.86	0.3843	3.611	11.75	17.3		JFC	–	MPC · JPL
348P/PanSTARRS	P/2011 A5; P/2017 A2	Pan-STARRS	5.64	0.3017	3.169	17.57	17.6		ETC	–	MPC · JPL
349P/Lemmon	P/2010 EY_{90} P/2017 B1	MLS	6.74	0.3005	3.568	5.50	7.5	1.76 km	ETC	–	MPC · JPL
350P/McNaught	P/2010 J5; P/2017 B2	R. H. McNaught	8.32	0.0869	4.105	7.36	11.2		ETC	–	MPC · JPL
351P/Wiegert–PanSTARRS	P/1998 U8; P/2007 R_{11}; P/2016 P2	P. Wiegert; Pan-STARRS	9.32	0.2951	4.428	12.79	12.3		JFC	–	MPC · JPL
352P/Skiff	P/2000 S1; P/2017 L1	B. A. Skiff	16.95	0.6177	6.598	21.06	10.9		JFC	–	MPC · JPL
353P/McNaught	P/2009 S2; P/2017 M1	R. H. McNaught	8.50	0.4694	4.164	28.42	8.5	0.985 km	JFC	–	MPC · JPL
354P/LINEAR	P/2010 A2; P/2017 B5	LINEAR	3.46	0.1250	2.290	5.26	15.5	0.062 km	ETC	–	MPC · JPL
355P/LINEAR–NEAT	P/2004 T1; P/2017 M2	LINEAR; NEAT	6.47	0.5081	3.472	11.04	12.9	0.6 km	JFC	–	MPC · JPL
356P/WISE	P/2010 D1; P/2017 O2	WISE	8.49	0.3540	4.163	9.63	7.4	1.265 km	JFC	–	MPC · JPL
357P/Hill	P/2008 T4; P/2017 Q1	R. E. Hill	9.39	0.4355	4.450	6.33	5.1		JFC	–	MPC · JPL
358P/PanSTARRS	P/2012 T1; P/2017 O3	Pan-STARRS	5.59	0.2377	3.150	11.06	7.7	0.29 km	ETC	–	MPC · JPL
359P/LONEOS	P/2007 RS_{41} P/2017 Q2	LONEOS	9.97	0.3225	4.631	10.26	14.8		JFC	–	MPC · JPL
360P/WISE	P/2010 P4; P/2017 S1	WISE	7.13	0.4973	3.703	24.08	18.1	0.47 km	JFC	–	MPC · JPL
361P/Spacewatch	P/2006 UR_{111} P/2017 S4	Spacewatch	11.00	0.4379	4.946	13.88	4.6	10.53 km	JFC	–	MPC · JPL
362P/2008 GO98 (unnamed) = (457175) 2008 GO98	P/2008 GO_{98}	Spacewatch	7.92	0.2787	3.973	15.56	–	7.75–10.05 km	MBA-O	–	MPC · JPL
363P/Lemmon	P/2011 VJ_{5} P/2017 W1	MLS	6.28	0.5577	3.405	3.97	18.1		JFC	–	MPC · JPL
364P/PanSTARRS	P/2013 CU_{129} P/2018 A2	Pan-STARRS	4.88	0.7226	2.878	12.15	17.4	0.6 km	JFC	✓	MPC · JPL
365P/PanSTARRS	P/2011 WG_{113} P/2017 U6	Pan-STARRS	5.69	0.5733	3.186	9.84	17.0		JFC	–	MPC · JPL
366P/Spacewatch	P/2005 JN; P/2018 F2	Spacewatch	6.55	0.3474	3.501	8.85	13.1		ETC	–	MPC · JPL
367P/Catalina	P/2011 CR_{42} P/2018 H1	CSS	6.58	0.2799	3.511	8.46	14.3		ETC	–	MPC · JPL
368P/NEAT	P/2005 R1; P/2018 L3	NEAT	12.91	0.6285	5.504	15.45	14.6	1.6 km	JFC	–	MPC · JPL
369P/Hill	P/2010 A1; P/2018 P1	R. E. Hill	9.18	0.5546	4.385	10.32	15.9	1.095 km	JFC	–	MPC · JPL
370P/NEAT	P/2001 T3; P/2018 P2	NEAT	16.41	0.6122	6.459	19.37	7.2		JFC	–	MPC · JPL
371P/LINEAR–Skiff	P/2001 R6; P/2018 R1	LINEAR; B. A. Skiff	8.50	0.4780	4.164	17.41	4.3	0.7 km	JFC	–	MPC · JPL
372P/McNaught	P/2008 O2; P/2018 P6	R. H. McNaught	9.53	0.1535	4.494	9.52	7.1		JFC	–	MPC · JPL
373P/Rinner	P/2011 W2; P/2018 R2	C. Rinner	7.41	0.3937	3.802	13.77	6.0	2.2 km	JFC	–	MPC · JPL
374P/Larson	P/2007 V1; P/2018 S1	S. M. Larson	11.08	0.4625	4.969	10.79	7.4		JFC	–	MPC · JPL
375P/Hill	P/2006 D1; P/2018 T1	R. E. Hill	13.13	0.6600	5.567	17.37	16.7		JFC	–	MPC · JPL
376P/LONEOS	P/2005 GF_{8} P/2018 X1	LONEOS	14.17	0.5147	5.857	1.19	9.5	3.35 km	JFC	–	MPC · JPL
377P/Scotti	P/2003 L1; P/2019 E1	J. V. Scotti	17.45	0.2515	6.728	9.02	12.3		JFC	–	MPC · JPL
378P/McNaught	P/2005 Y2; P/2019 E2	R. H. McNaught	15.96	0.4670	6.340	19.11	12.3	5.1 km	JFC	–	MPC · JPL
379P/Spacewatch	P/2006 F4; P/2019 D2	Spacewatch	6.63	0.3365	3.529	12.38	10.8		JFC	–	MPC · JPL
380P/PanSTARRS	P/2011 O2; P/2019 G1	Pan-STARRS	9.63	0.3264	4.528	8.23	7.6		JFC	–	MPC · JPL
381P/LINEAR–Spacewatch	P/2000 S4; P/2019 K2	LINEAR; Spacewatch	19.01	0.6795	7.123	28.46	13.6		JFC	–	MPC · JPL
382P/Larson	P/2007 R1; P/2019 K3	S. M. Larson	14.89	0.2762	6.052	7.87	7.0	18.575 km	JFC	–	MPC · JPL
383P/Christensen	P/2006 S1; P/2019 M1	E. J. Christensen	6.54	0.6114	3.497	11.87	18.6		JFC	–	MPC · JPL
384P/Kowalski	P/2014 U2; P/2019 O1	R. A. Kowalski	4.96	0.6154	2.908	7.29	20.0		JFC	✓	MPC · JPL
385P/Hill	P/2010 U2; P/2019 P1	R. E. Hill	8.84	0.4023	4.275	16.86	7.4		JFC	–	MPC · JPL
386P/PanSTARRS	P/2011 U1	Pan-STARRS	8.16	0.4178	4.052	15.24	13.5		JFC	–	MPC · JPL
387P/Boattini	P/2008 Y1; P/2019 R1	A. Boattini	10.51	0.7360	4.799	8.90	14.2	1.44 km	JFC	✓	MPC · JPL
388P/Gibbs	P/2007 T4; P/2019 R2	A. R. Gibbs	11.99	0.6189	5.239	23.88	10.9		JFC	–	MPC · JPL
389P/Siding Spring	P/2006 R1; P/2019 S1	Siding Spring	13.32	0.7047	5.620	160.07	14.3	1.315 km	JFC	–	MPC · JPL
390P/Gibbs	P/2006 W1; P/2019 U1	A. R. Gibbs	14.00	0.7058	5.810	18.52	12.2		JFC	–	MPC · JPL
391P/Kowalski	P/2006 F1; P/2019 U2	R. A. Kowalski	10.13	0.1198	4.680	21.27	9.9		JFC	–	MPC · JPL
392P/LINEAR	P/2004 WR_{9} P/2019 U3	LINEAR	15.27	0.6825	6.156	4.94	16.4	1.5 km	JFC	–	MPC · JPL
393P/Spacewatch–Hill	P/2009 SK_{280} P/2019 S5	Spacewatch; R. E. Hill	10.43	0.1196	4.774	16.81	7.6		JFC	–	MPC · JPL
394P/PanSTARRS	P/2011 GN_{5} P/2020 F4	Pan-STARRS	9.04	0.3693	4.339	8.53	16.9		JFC	–	MPC · JPL
395P/Catalina–NEAT	P/2005 JD_{108} P/2020 H1	CSS; NEAT	16.88	0.3821	6.579	3.28	9.9	2.8 km	JFC	–	MPC · JPL
396P/Leonard	P/2002 E4; P/2020 F1	G. J. Leonard	17.90	0.4178	6.842	5.43	15.7		JFC	–	MPC · JPL
397P/Lemmon	P/2012 SB_{6} P/2020 M2	MLS	7.59	0.3999	3.862	11.03	15.5		JFC	–	MPC · JPL
398P/Boattini	P/2009 Q4; P/2020 P2	A. Boattini	5.53	0.5826	3.128	11.02	15.3	0.6 km	JFC	–	MPC · JPL
399P/PanSTARRS	P/2013 O2; P/2020 O4	Pan-STARRS	7.44	0.4419	3.812	13.35	15.9		JFC	–	MPC · JPL
400P/PanSTARRS	P/2013 PA_{104} P/2020 R1	Pan-STARRS	6.72	0.4090	3.560	10.93	13.7	3.095 km	JFC	–	MPC · JPL
Comet designation	MPC designations	Discoverer(s) or namesake(s)	Period (years)	e	a (AU)	i (°)	Abs. mag (M1)	Nucleus radii	Class	NEC	Ref

back to top

=== 401 to 500 ===
Comet designation	MPC designations	Discoverer(s) or namesake(s)	Period (years)	e	a (AU)	i (°)	Abs. mag (M1)	Nucleus radii	Class	NEC	Ref
401P/McNaught	P/2006 H1; P/2020 R3	R. H. McNaught	13.58	0.5820	5.693	12.87	10.8		JFC	–	MPC · JPL
402P/LINEAR	P/2002 T5; P/2020 Q3	LINEAR	18.44	0.4388	6.979	30.89	6.3	6.6 km	JFC	–	MPC · JPL
403P/Catalina	P/2007 VQ_{11} P/2020 T1	CSS	12.58	0.5037	5.408	12.32	7.1	4.3 km	JFC	–	MPC · JPL
404P/Bressi	P/2011 U2; P/2020 M6	T. Bressi	11.65	0.0950	5.140	9.82	13.4		JFC	–	MPC · JPL
405P/Lemmon	P/2013 TL_{117}; P/2013 UT_{2}; P/2020 U1	MLS	6.85	0.6891	3.607	9.37	18.8	0.315 km	JFC	✓	MPC · JPL
406P/Gibbs	P/2007 R2; P/2020 R8	A. R. Gibbs	6.38	0.5740	3.440	1.43	16.7		JFC	–	MPC · JPL
407P/PanSTARRS–Fuls	P/2013 J4; P/2019 Y2	Pan-STARRS; D. C. Fuls	6.42	0.3850	3.455	4.90	7.2	0.96 km	ETC	–	MPC · JPL
408P/Novichonok–Gerke	P/2011 R3; P/2020 M7	A. Novichonok; V. Gerke	10.49	0.2697	4.791	19.22	6.8	19.275 km	JFC	–	MPC · JPL
409P/LONEOS–Hill	P/2005 XA_{54} P/2020 V1	LONEOS; R. E. Hill	14.89	0.7107	6.053	17.14	14.2	2.71 km	JFC	–	MPC · JPL
410P/NEAT–LINEAR	P/2003 WR_{168}; P/2005 CR_{16}; P/2020 W2	NEAT; LINEAR	17.08	0.5104	6.632	9.39	15.2		JFC	–	MPC · JPL
411P/Christensen	P/2007 B1; P/2020 W3	E. J. Christensen	13.99	0.5820	5.807	12.39	14.7		JFC	–	MPC · JPL
412P/WISE	P/2010 B2; P/2020 Y1	WISE	5.48	0.4809	3.107	8.94	15.2	0.495 km	ETC	–	MPC · JPL
413P/Larson	P/2014 E1; P/2020 W4	S. M. Larson	7.16	0.4238	3.714	15.98	13.9	2.905 km	JFC	–	MPC · JPL
414P/STEREO	P/2016 J3; P/2021 A3	STEREO	4.67	0.8117	2.795	23.38	16.0	0.51 km	JFC	✓	MPC · JPL
415P/Tenagra	P/2013 EW_{90} P/2020 Y4	Tenagra II	8.35	0.1952	4.115	31.79	7.4		JFC	–	MPC · JPL
416P/Scotti	P/2013 A2; P/2021 A8	J. V. Scotti	8.02	0.4557	4.005	3.37	16.1		JFC	–	MPC · JPL
417P/NEOWISE	P/2015 J3; P/2021 B1	NEOWISE	6.13	0.5546	3.350	8.13	17.5	1.15 km	JFC	–	MPC · JPL
418P/LINEAR	P/2010 A5; P/2020 Y5	LINEAR	11.52	0.6637	5.102	5.78	13.9	1.265 km	JFC	–	MPC · JPL
419P/PanSTARRS	P/2015 F1; P/2021 A_{11}	Pan-STARRS	6.61	0.2785	3.523	2.80	7.2		ETC	–	MPC · JPL
420P/Hill	P/2009 Q1; P/2021 E1	R. E. Hill	12.98	0.4946	5.522	14.44	14.3		JFC	–	MPC · JPL
421P/McNaught	P/2009 U4; P/2020 H_{10}	R. H. McNaught	11.45	0.6754	5.080	10.09	13.7		JFC	–	MPC · JPL
422P/Christensen	P/2006 S4; P/2021 L1	E. J. Christensen	15.67	0.5061	6.261	39.59	7.1		JFC	–	MPC · JPL
423P/Lemmon	P/2008 CL_{94} P/2021 A_{12}	MLS	15.28	0.1201	6.158	8.35	13.8	2.0 km	JFC	–	MPC · JPL
424P/La Sagra	P/2012 S2; P/2021 L5	LSSS	9.23	0.6928	4.401	8.64	17.8	1.495 km	JFC	–	MPC · JPL
425P/Kowalski	P/2005 W3; P/2021 O2	R. A. Kowalski	15.97	0.5424	6.340	16.43	7.2	0.58 km	JFC	–	MPC · JPL
426P/PanSTARRS	P/2019 A7; P/2021 K4	Pan-STARRS	5.69	0.1607	3.188	17.77	17.3	1.0 km	ETC	–	MPC · JPL
427P/ATLAS	P/2017 S5; P/2021 L6	ATLAS	5.65	0.3130	3.171	11.85	10.7	0.45 km	ETC	–	MPC · JPL
428P/Gibbs	P/2014 W_{12} P/2021 Q1	A. R. Gibbs	6.50	0.5190	3.483	8.51	11.7		JFC	–	MPC · JPL
429P/LINEAR–Hill	P/2008 QP_{20} P/2021 M1	LINEAR; R. E. Hill	6.53	0.5067	3.492	7.75	12.1	1.2 km	JFC	–	MPC · JPL
430P/Scotti	P/2011 A2; P/2021 Q2	J. V. Scotti	5.48	0.4997	3.107	4.47	16.9	0.875 km	ETC	–	MPC · JPL
431P/Scotti	P/2015 Q1; P/2021 P5	J. V. Scotti	6.39	0.4879	3.442	22.67	12.0	0.85 km	JFC	–	MPC · JPL
432P/PanSTARRS	P/2016 U2; P/2021 N4	Pan-STARRS	5.29	0.2425	3.037	10.07	18.4		ETC	–	MPC · JPL
433P/2005 QN_{173} (unnamed) = (248370) 2005 QN173	P/2005 QN_{173}	NEAT	5.37	0.2252	3.065	0.07	–	1.61 km	MBA-O	–	MPC · JPL
434P/Tenagra	P/2012 TK_{8} P/2021 S2	Tenagra II	8.45	0.2715	4.150	6.32	9.2		JFC	–	MPC · JPL
435P/PanSTARRS	P/2015 K6; P/2021 T3	Pan-STARRS	5.24	0.3186	3.018	18.89	18.8		ETC	–	MPC · JPL
436P/Garradd	P/2007 R4; P/2021 U2	G. J. Garradd	14.19	0.6718	5.862	20.21	11.3		JFC	–	MPC · JPL
437P/Lemmon–PanSTARRS	P/2011 UE_{215} P/2021 V3	MLS; Pan-STARRS	9.74	0.2523	4.560	3.69	7.7		JFC	–	MPC · JPL
438P/Christensen	P/2005 T2; P/2012 V5; P/2020 OV_{62}	E. J. Christensen	7.48	0.4220	3.825	8.34	17.8		JFC	–	MPC · JPL
439P/LINEAR	P/2008 WZ_{96} P/2021 W1	LINEAR	6.16	0.5098	3.359	6.96	12.4		JFC	–	MPC · JPL
440P/Kobayashi	P/1997 B1; P/2021 W2	T. Kobayashi	25.07	0.7611	8.567	12.38	7.4	0.91 km	JFC	–	MPC · JPL
441P/PanSTARRS	P/2017 R1; P/2022 B2	Pan-STARRS	8.40	0.1951	4.134	2.57	16.1		JFC	–	MPC · JPL
442P/McNaught	P/2011 Q3; P/2022 G1	R. H. McNaught	11.08	0.5316	4.971	6.05	10.6		JFC	–	MPC · JPL
443P/PanSTARRS–Christensen	P/2005 N_{11}; P/2015 PO_{210}; P/2022 E1	Pan-STARRS; E. J. Christensen	8.40	0.2845	4.132	19.89	6.4		JFC	–	MPC · JPL
444P/WISE–PanSTARRS	P/2010 LK_{36}; P/2016 MD; P/2016 PM_{1}; P/2022 C4	WISE; Pan-STARRS	6.35	0.5704	3.429	22.13	16.7	1.5 km	JFC	–	MPC · JPL
445P/Lemmon–PanSTARRS	P/1998 W9; P/2006 S_{14}; P/2014 R5; P/2022 L5	MLS; Pan-STARRS	8.17	0.4124	4.058	1.09	14.5		JFC	–	MPC · JPL
446P/McNaught	P/2012 O3; P/2022 G2	R. H. McNaught	9.80	0.6469	4.581	16.57	17.5	0.84 km	JFC	–	MPC · JPL
447P/Sheppard–Tholen	P/2008 T_{14} P/2021 R9	S. Sheppard; D. J. Tholen	13.59	0.1807	5.695	7.41	7.6		JFC	–	MPC · JPL
448P/PanSTARRS	P/2008 T_{13}; P/2015 X1; P/2022 Q1	Pan-STARRS	6.92	0.4190	3.630	12.15	18.0		JFC	–	MPC · JPL
449P/Leonard	X/1987 A2; P/2013 Y3; P/2020 S6	G. J. Leonard	6.83	0.4790	3.598	15.46	8.6		JFC	–	MPC · JPL
450P/LONEOS	P/2004 A1; P/2022 Q3	LONEOS	22.32	0.3129	7.928	10.57	6.6	1.8 km	JFC	–	MPC · JPL
451P/Christensen	P/2006 WY_{182}; P/2007 A2; P/2022 S2	E. J. Christensen	15.88	0.5574	6.317	26.49	11.6		JFC	–	MPC · JPL
452P/Sheppard–Jewitt	P/2003 CC_{22} P/2022 B5	S. Sheppard; D. C. Jewitt	19.61	0.4280	7.271	6.43	13.2		JFC	–	MPC · JPL
453P/WISE–Lemmon	P/2010 BN_{109} P/2022 V1	WISE; MLS	12.75	0.5824	5.457	27.07	11.4	0.99 km	JFC	–	MPC · JPL
454P/PanSTARRS	P/2013 W3; P/2022 U5	Pan-STARRS	8.63	0.3615	4.208	19.81	13.6		JFC	–	MPC · JPL
455P/PanSTARRS	P/2011 Q5; P/2017 S9; P/2022 R7	Pan-STARRS	5.60	0.3042	3.155	14.14	9.4	0.48 km	ETC	–	MPC · JPL
456P/PanSTARRS	P/2012 Q3; P/2021 L4	Pan-STARRS	5.63	0.1187	3.165	16.96	10.0	1.0 km	ETC	–	MPC · JPL
457P/Lemmon–PanSTARRS	P/2016 N7; P/2020 O1	MLS; Pan-STARRS	4.31	0.1198	2.646	5.22	16.1	0.42 km	ETC	–	MPC · JPL
458P/Jahn	P/2016 C3; P/2023 C1	J. Jahn	7.59	0.3150	3.861	13.61	9.2		JFC	–	MPC · JPL
459P/Catalina	P/2010 VH_{95}	Catalina	6.14	0.5217	3.353	13.68	17.2	1.7 km	JFC	–	MPC · JPL
460P/PanSTARRS	P/2016 BA_{14} P/2020 U6	Pan-STARRS	5.25	0.6663	3.022	18.92	20.9	0.55–0.8 km	JFC	✓	MPC · JPL
461P/WISE	P/2010 OE_{101} P/2021 LJ_{31}	WISE	5.56	0.5704	3.139	18.41	17.5	1.07 km	JFC	–	MPC · JPL
462P/LONEOS–PanSTARRS	P/2000 OZ_{21} P/2022 M1	LONEOS; Pan-STARRS	10.81	0.5779	4.888	7.03	16.5		JFC	–	MPC · JPL
463P/NEOWISE	P/2018 HT_{3}	NEOWISE	5.14	0.8250	2.977	29.50	18.3	0.16 km	JFC	–	MPC · JPL
464P/PanSTARRS	P/2014 OL_{465}	Pan-STARRS	10.16	0.2810	4.690	21.67	7.0		JFC	–	MPC · JPL
465P/Hill	P/2008 L2; P/2023 L1	R. E. Hill	14.72	0.6140	6.007	25.85	6.8		JFC	–	MPC · JPL
466P/PanSTARRS	P/2015 T3; P/2023 M3	Pan-STARRS	8.14	0.4668	4.045	12.24	12.2		JFC	–	MPC · JPL
467P/LINEAR–Grauer	P/2010 TO_{20} P/2023 H6	LINEAR; A. D. Grauer	13.55	0.0739	5.685	2.55	9.4	5.3 km	JFC	–	MPC · JPL
468P/Siding Spring	P/2004 V3; P/2023 O1	Siding Spring	19.09	0.4441	7.142	50.36	11.5	0.92 km	JFC	–	MPC · JPL
469P/PanSTARRS	P/2015 XG_{422}	Pan-STARRS	9.02	0.3116	4.334	20.16	14.8		JFC	–	MPC · JPL
470P/PanSTARRS	P/2014 W1; P/2023 O2	Pan-STARRS	9.42	0.3887	4.459	8.84	17.0		JFC	–	MPC · JPL
471P/LINEAR–Lemmon	P/2010 YK_{3} P/2023 KF_{3}	LINEAR; MLS	13.62	0.6276	5.704	4.79	5.5	3.345 km	JFC	–	MPC · JPL
472P/NEAT–LINEAR	P/2002 T6; P/2023 RL_{75}	NEAT; LINEAR	21.21	0.5567	7.663	11.01	7.1	4.2 km	JFC	–	MPC · JPL
473P/NEAT	P/2001 Q6; P/2023 W1	NEAT	22.31	0.8224	7.930	56.91	10.9		HTC	–	MPC · JPL
474P/Hogan	P/2017 O4; P/2023 S4	Hogan	5.54	0.1887	3.129	1.10	14.7		ETC	–	MPC · JPL
475P/Spacewatch–LINEAR	P/2004 DO_{29} P/2023 V7	Spacewatch; LINEAR	19.755	0.4394	7.304	14.52	10.1	0.535 km	JFC	–	MPC · JPL
476P/PanSTARRS	P/2015 HG_{16} P/2023 W2	Pan-STARRS	10.41	0.3457	4.767	18.89	16.1		JFC	–	MPC · JPL
477P/PanSTARRS	P/2018 P3; P/2023 V8	Pan-STARRS	5.22	0.4160	3.007	8.91	7.8	0.71 km	ETC	–	MPC · JPL
478P/ATLAS	P/2017 BQ_{100} P/2023 Y3	ATLAS	6.97	0.3438	3.649	12.52	9.8		JFC	–	MPC · JPL
479P/Elenin	P/2011 NO_{1} P/2023 WM_{26}	Leonid Elenin	13.32	0.7784	5.618	15.39	15.2	1.0 km	JFC	✓	MPC · JPL
480P/PanSTARRS	P/2014 A3; P/2023 X6	Pan-STARRS	10.03	0.2414	4.652	13.69	14.6		JFC	–	MPC · JPL
481P/Lemmon–PanSTARRS	P/2012 WA_{34} P/2024 C5	MLS; Pan-STARRS	10.47	0.3371	4.786	6.120	15.2		JFC	–	MPC · JPL
482P/PanSTARRS	P/2014 VF_{40}	Pan-STARRS	7.30	0.4931	3.763	24.534	17.0		JFC	–	MPC · JPL
483P/PanSTARRS	P/2016 J1	Pan-STARRS	5.65	0.2283	3.172	14.33	17.0	0.31 km (A); 0.17 km (B)	ETC	–	MPC · JPL
484P/Spacewatch	P/2005 XR_{132}	Spacewatch	7.30	0.4329	3.762	14.469	15.2	1.7 km	JFC	–	MPC · JPL
485P/Sheppard–Tholen	P/2006 AH_{2} P/2022 U6	S. Sheppard; D. Tholen	15.89	0.4159	6.841	10.010	6.6		JFC	–	MPC · JPL
486P/Leonard	P/2018 L5; P/2024 H1	G. J. Leonard	6.91	0.3647	3.626	2.209	14.9		JFC	–	MPC · JPL
487P/Siding Spring	P/2012 US_{27} P/2024 N5	Siding Spring	11.74	0.6473	5.166	39.326	7.4		JFC	–	MPC · JPL
488P/NEAT–PanSTARRS	P/2002 QU_{151} P/2024 N6	NEAT; Pan-STARRS	7.22	0.5504	3.737	11.366	15.7		JFC	–	MPC · JPL
489P/Denning	D/1894 F1; P/2007 HE_{4}	W. F. Denning	9.37	0.6456	4.443	4.007	7.6		JFC	–	MPC · JPL
490P/ATLAS	P/2019 M2; P/2024 C6	ATLAS	5.26	0.6485	3.025	12.282	20.5		JFC	✓	MPC · JPL
491P/Spacewatch–PanSTARRS	P/2014 MG4; P/2024 K2	Spacewatch; Pan-STARRS	11.22	0.2593	5.012	9.368	13.8		JFC	–	MPC · JPL
492P/LINEAR	P/2010 PB_{57}; P/2010 WK; P/2024 O3	LINEAR	13.74	0.6921	5.736	11.477	15.9	1.22 km	JFC	–	MPC · JPL
493P/LONEOS	P/2005 SB_{216} P/2024 Q2	LONEOS	9.15	0.4656	7.157	24.115	7.1	8.2 km	JFC	–	MPC · JPL
494P/PanSTARRS	P/2010 T8; P/2017 R2; P/2024 N2	Pan-STARRS	7.40	0.3575	3.798	7.788	15.9		JFC	–	MPC · JPL
495P/Christensen	P/2016 A2; P/2024 RU_{145}	Christensen	10.35	0.2712	4.750	26.357	11.5		JFC	–	MPC · JPL
496P/Hill	P/2010 A3; P/2024 S3	Hill	14.97	0.7324	6.073	14.929	11.7	0.865 km	JFC	–	MPC · JPL
497P/Spacewatch–PanSTARRS	P/2011 UA_{134} P/2024 T4	Spacewatch; Pan-STARRS	13.20	0.6321	5.586	10.532	8.8		JFC	–	MPC · JPL
498P/LINEAR	P/2015 CD_{60}	LINEAR	9.84	0.5724	4.592	14.479	6.2		JFC	–	MPC · JPL
499P/Catalina	P/2019 Y3; P/2025 A5	Catalina	5.24	0.6914	3.015	24.588	19.6		JFC	✓	MPC · JPL
500P/PanSTARRS	P/2019 A8; P/2025 B3	Pan-STARRS	6.31	0.3759	3.416	2.301	14.4		ETC	–	MPC · JPL
Comet designation	MPC designations	Discoverer(s) or namesake(s)	Period (years)	e	a (AU)	i (°)	Abs. mag (M1)	Nucleus radii	Class	NEC	Ref

back to top

=== 500 to 600 ===
Comet designation	MPC designations	Discoverer(s) or namesake(s)	Period (years)	e	a (AU)	i (°)	Abs. mag (M1)	Nucleus radii	Class	NEC	Ref
501P/Rankin (Rankin 5)	P/2014 N4; P/2017 B6; P/2024 L4	D. Rankin	3.34	0.6957	2.236	10.104	21.9		ETC	✓	MPC · JPL
502P/NEAT	P/2003 QX_{29} P/2025 H1	NEAT	22.62	0.4712	7.998	11.399	14.1	7.2 km	JFC	–	MPC · JPL
503P/PanSTARRS	P/2011 F2; P/2018 L1; P/2025 F3	Pan-STARRS	6.99	0.4813	3.658	10.575	14.2		JFC	–	MPC · JPL
504P/WISE–PanSTARRS	P/2010 LH_{155}	WISE; Pan-STARRS	7.25	0.406	3.745	8.807	4.9		JFC	–	MPC · JPL
505P/Palomar	P/2009 KF_{37}	Palomar	8.23	0.319	4.077	11.483	16.8		JFC	–	MPC · JPL
506P/WISE–LINEAR	P/2010 PT_{8}; P/2010 KG_{43}	WISE; LINEAR	13.17	0.482	5.576	13.653	8.5	1.745 km	JFC	–	MPC · JPL
507P/Lemmon	P/2007 SA_{24}	MLS	15.77	0.568	6.289	17.095	15.8		JFC	–	MPC · JPL
508P/McNaught	P/2005 J1; P/2025 O1	R. H. McNaught	6.74	0.571	3.569	31.770	14.3		JFC	–	MPC · JPL
509P/Catalina	P/2007 C2; P/2024 T6	Catalina	18.60	0.462	7.021	8.673	7.0	7.9 km	JFC	–	MPC · JPL
510P/Boattini	P/2010 U1; P/2025 M4	A. Boattini	16.79	0.254	6.557	8.289	7.2	7.675 km	JFC	–	MPC · JPL
511P/PanSTARRS	P/2015 X9; P/2020 O5; P/2025 Q2	PanSTARRS	5.23	0.23771	3.012	14.783	15.9		ETC	–	MPC · JPL
512P/PanSTARRS	P/2012 T2; P/2025 O3	PanSTARRS	13.71	0.15528	5.728	12.55	7.3		JFC	–	MPC · JPL
513P/Broughton	P/2005 T5; P/2025 S1	J. Broughton	19.68	0.55023	7.288	21.349	7.4	1.3 km	JFC	–	MPC · JPL
514P/Lemmon–PanSTARRS 5	P/2015 TO_{19} P/2025 S4	Lemmon; PanSTARRS	9.718	0.35893	4.554	6.499	7.5		JFC	–	MPC · JPL
515P/PanSTARRS (PanSTARRS 103)	P/2017 B4; P/2026 AH_{19}	PanSTARRS	9.1	0.360	4.37	14.6	15.0		JFC	–	MPC · JPL
516P/PanSTARRS	P/2013 G10; P/2018 X4; P/2026 B1	PanSTARRS	6.90	0.37254	2.438	4.017	17.9		ETC	–	MPC · JPL
Comet designation	MPC designations	Discoverer(s) or namesake(s)	Period (years)	e	a (AU)	i (°)	Abs. mag (M1)	Nucleus radii	Class	NEC	Ref

back to top

== Multiples ==
=== 51P/Harrington ===
back to main list

This is a list of 51P/Harrington (3 entries) with all its cometary fragments listed at JPL's SBDB (see list).

Comet designation	Period (years)	e	a (AU)	i (°)	J_{Tiss}	M1	M2	Diam.	Ref
51P/Harrington	7.16	0.542	3.714	5.424	2.814	11.8	15.1	4.8 km	MPC · JPL
51P/Harrington-A	6.78	0.562	3.581	8.655	2.810	10.	15.	4.8 km	JPL
51P/Harrington-D	7.16	0.542	3.714	5.425	2.814	8.6	14.7	–	JPL

=== 57P/du Toit–Neujmin–Delporte ===
back to main list

This is a list of 57P/du Toit–Neujmin–Delporte (2 entries) with all its cometary fragments listed at JPL's SBDB (see list).

Comet designation	Period (years)	e	a (AU)	i (°)	J_{Tiss}	M1	M2	Diam.	Ref
57P/duToit-Neujmin-Delporte	6.42	0.499	3.453	2.848	2.917	13.9	?	–	MPC · JPL
57P/duToit-Neujmin-Delporte-A	6.41	0.499	3.452	2.845	2.917	8.5	16.	–	JPL

=== 73P/Schwassmann–Wachmann ===
back to main list

In 1995, comet 73P/Schwassmann–Wachmann, broke up into several pieces and as of its last perihelion date, the pieces numbered at least 67 with 73P/Schwassmann–Wachmann C as the presumed original nucleus. Because of the enormous number, the pieces of it have been compiled into a separate list.

This is a list of 73P/Schwassmann–Wachmann (68 entries) with all its cometary fragments listed at JPL's SBDB (see list).

Comet designation	Period (years)	e	a (AU)	i (°)	J_{Tiss}	M1	M2	Diam.	Ref
73P/Schwassmann–Wachmann 3	5.44	0.686	3.092	11.237	2.784	12.	15.	–	MPC · JPL
73P/Schwassmann–Wachmann 3-B	5.36	0.693	3.062	11.397	2.783	15.2	?	–	JPL
73P/Schwassmann–Wachmann 3-C	5.36	0.692	3.063	11.379	2.784	13.2	?	–	JPL
73P/Schwassmann–Wachmann 3-E	5.36	0.694	3.062	11.406	2.782	10.4	?	–	JPL
73P/Schwassmann–Wachmann 3-G	5.36	0.693	3.063	11.390	2.783	16.8	18.0	–	JPL
73P/Schwassmann–Wachmann 3-H	5.37	0.694	3.065	11.391	2.782	20.2	21.7	–	JPL
73P/Schwassmann–Wachmann 3-J	5.31	0.692	3.044	11.380	2.793	–	–	–	JPL
73P/Schwassmann–Wachmann 3-K	5.36	0.694	3.064	11.391	2.782	20.9	?	–	JPL
73P/Schwassmann–Wachmann 3-L	5.40	0.695	3.076	11.399	2.776	20.9	21.7	–	JPL
73P/Schwassmann–Wachmann 3-M	5.37	0.694	3.068	11.394	2.780	21.0	21.8	–	JPL
73P/Schwassmann–Wachmann 3-N	5.33	0.692	3.052	11.381	2.788	20.4	21.2	–	JPL
73P/Schwassmann–Wachmann 3-P	5.42	0.696	3.085	11.405	2.771	–	–	–	JPL
73P/Schwassmann–Wachmann 3-Q	5.51	0.699	3.118	11.419	2.754	21.5	?	–	JPL
73P/Schwassmann–Wachmann 3-R	5.38	0.694	3.070	11.395	2.779	19.2	20.0	–	JPL
73P/Schwassmann–Wachmann 3-S	6.09	0.693	3.334	11.048	2.693	21.1	?	–	JPL
73P/Schwassmann–Wachmann 3-T	5.89	0.712	3.261	11.512	2.685	–	–	–	JPL
73P/Schwassmann–Wachmann 3-U	5.26	0.689	3.024	11.360	2.803	–	–	–	JPL
73P/Schwassmann–Wachmann 3-V	5.13	0.693	2.976	11.652	2.816	–	–	–	JPL
73P/Schwassmann–Wachmann 3-W	5.47	0.698	3.105	11.418	2.761	–	–	–	JPL
73P/Schwassmann–Wachmann 3-X	5.40	0.695	3.076	11.399	2.776	21.7	?	–	JPL
73P/Schwassmann–Wachmann 3-Y	6.13	0.720	3.348	11.562	2.646	–	–	–	JPL
73P/Schwassmann–Wachmann 3-Z	5.38	0.693	3.072	11.349	2.779	–	–	–	JPL
73P/Schwassmann–Wachmann 3-AA	5.04	0.681	2.941	11.295	2.849	–	–	–	JPL
73P/Schwassmann–Wachmann 3-AB	5.31	0.691	3.042	11.373	2.794	–	–	–	JPL
73P/Schwassmann–Wachmann 3-AC	5.41	0.695	3.083	11.405	2.772	–	–	–	JPL
73P/Schwassmann–Wachmann 3-AD	5.37	0.693	3.068	11.368	2.781	–	–	–	JPL
73P/Schwassmann–Wachmann 3-AE	5.45	0.697	3.096	11.415	2.765	–	–	–	JPL
73P/Schwassmann–Wachmann 3-AF	4.96	0.676	2.908	11.240	2.870	–	–	–	JPL
73P/Schwassmann–Wachmann 3-AG	5.42	0.696	3.087	11.408	2.770	–	–	–	JPL
73P/Schwassmann–Wachmann 3-AH	5.39	0.693	3.075	11.331	2.778	–	–	–	JPL
73P/Schwassmann–Wachmann 3-AI	5.49	0.698	3.111	11.431	2.757	21.3	?	–	JPL
73P/Schwassmann–Wachmann 3-AJ	10.14	0.800	4.685	12.149	2.223	21.3	?	–	JPL
73P/Schwassmann–Wachmann 3-AK	5.35	0.693	3.058	11.429	2.784	18.8	?	–	JPL
73P/Schwassmann–Wachmann 3-AL	5.53	0.700	3.128	11.444	2.749	–	–	–	JPL
73P/Schwassmann–Wachmann 3-AM	5.29	0.693	3.036	11.544	2.793	–	–	–	JPL
73P/Schwassmann–Wachmann 3-AN	5.40	0.695	3.076	11.405	2.776	–	–	–	JPL
73P/Schwassmann–Wachmann 3-AO	5.38	0.694	3.072	11.326	2.779	–	–	–	JPL
73P/Schwassmann–Wachmann 3-AP	5.58	0.701	3.144	11.466	2.741	20.3	21.2	–	JPL
73P/Schwassmann–Wachmann 3-AQ	5.43	0.696	3.088	11.414	2.770	17.5	18.5	–	JPL
73P/Schwassmann–Wachmann 3-AR	5.43	0.696	3.087	11.407	2.770	21.8	?	–	JPL
73P/Schwassmann–Wachmann 3-AS	5.56	0.701	3.140	11.461	2.743	20.3	22.3	–	JPL
73P/Schwassmann–Wachmann 3-AT	5.20	0.687	3.001	11.335	2.816	21.0	?	–	JPL
73P/Schwassmann–Wachmann 3-AU	5.35	0.693	3.058	11.382	2.785	–	–	–	JPL
73P/Schwassmann–Wachmann 3-AV	5.36	0.693	3.062	11.395	2.783	–	–	–	JPL
73P/Schwassmann–Wachmann 3-AW	4.97	0.677	2.914	11.240	2.866	–	–	–	JPL
73P/Schwassmann–Wachmann 3-AX	5.33	0.692	3.050	11.428	2.789	–	–	–	JPL
73P/Schwassmann–Wachmann 3-AY	4.92	0.675	2.894	11.226	2.877	–	–	–	JPL
73P/Schwassmann–Wachmann 3-AZ	4.92	0.675	2.894	11.221	2.877	–	–	–	JPL
73P/Schwassmann–Wachmann 3-BA	5.09	0.682	2.961	11.271	2.839	–	–	–	JPL
73P/Schwassmann–Wachmann 3-BB	5.11	0.682	2.968	11.190	2.836	–	–	–	JPL
73P/Schwassmann–Wachmann 3-BC	5.55	0.700	3.134	11.459	2.746	19.8	20.1	–	JPL
73P/Schwassmann–Wachmann 3-BD	5.14	0.682	2.979	10.975	2.832	–	–	–	JPL
73P/Schwassmann–Wachmann 3-BE	5.09	0.682	2.958	11.317	2.840	–	–	–	JPL
73P/Schwassmann–Wachmann 3-BF	5.17	0.686	2.989	11.322	2.823	–	–	–	JPL
73P/Schwassmann–Wachmann 3-BG	5.14	0.685	2.980	11.325	2.828	–	–	–	JPL
73P/Schwassmann–Wachmann 3-BH	5.09	0.682	2.959	11.289	2.839	–	–	–	JPL
73P/Schwassmann–Wachmann 3-BI	5.09	0.682	2.960	11.300	2.839	–	–	–	JPL
73P/Schwassmann–Wachmann 3-BJ	5.30	0.691	3.041	11.370	2.795	–	–	–	JPL
73P/Schwassmann–Wachmann 3-BK	5.31	0.692	3.045	11.371	2.792	23.7	?	–	JPL
73P/Schwassmann–Wachmann 3-BL	5.44	0.696	3.091	11.409	2.768	22.4	?	–	JPL
73P/Schwassmann–Wachmann 3-BM	5.09	0.682	2.959	11.294	2.839	–	–	–	JPL
73P/Schwassmann–Wachmann 3-BN	5.32	0.692	3.047	11.377	2.791	21.3	22.0	–	JPL
73P/Schwassmann–Wachmann 3-BO	5.32	0.692	3.048	11.376	2.791	22.9	24.5	–	JPL
73P/Schwassmann–Wachmann 3-BP	5.09	0.682	2.960	11.291	2.839	–	–	–	JPL
73P/Schwassmann–Wachmann 3-BQ	5.34	0.692	3.054	11.388	2.788	20.8	23.4	–	JPL
73P/Schwassmann–Wachmann 3-BR	5.16	0.685	2.984	11.319	2.825	–	–	–	JPL
73P/Schwassmann–Wachmann 3-BS	5.50	0.699	3.115	11.444	2.756	–	–	–	JPL
73P/Schwassmann–Wachmann 3-BT	5.44	0.686	3.092	11.238	2.784	13.3	?	–	JPL

=== 101P/Chernykh ===
back to main list

This is a list of 101P/Chernykh (2 entries) with all its cometary fragments listed at JPL's SBDB (see list).

Comet designation	Period (years)	e	a (AU)	i (°)	J_{Tiss}	M1	M2	Diam.	Ref
101P/Chernykh	13.91	0.594	5.785	5.080	2.590	11.7	14.0	5.6 km	MPC · JPL
101P/Chernykh-B	13.97	0.595	5.800	5.078	2.588	13.0	?	–	JPL

=== 128P/Shoemaker–Holt ===
back to main list

This is a list of 128P/Shoemaker–Holt (3 entries) with all its cometary fragments listed at JPL's SBDB (see list).

Comet designation	Period (years)	e	a (AU)	i (°)	J_{Tiss}	M1	M2	Diam.	Ref
128P/Shoemaker–Holt 1	9.56	0.322	4.505	4.363	2.912	7.0	14.2	–	MPC · JPL
128P/Shoemaker-Holt 1-A	9.73	0.334	4.557	4.354	2.901	8.5	14.	–	JPL
128P/Shoemaker-Holt 1-B	9.51	0.321	4.489	4.362	2.913	5.6	16.7	4.6 km	JPL

=== 141P/Machholz ===
back to main list

This is a list of 141P/Machholz (3 entries) with all its cometary fragments listed at JPL's SBDB (see list) and CBAT.

Comet designation	Period (years)	e	a (AU)	i (°)	J_{Tiss}	M1	M2	Diam.	Ref
141P/Machholz 2 (141P/Machholz 2-A)	5.34	0.736	3.056	13.942	–	14.7	19.0	–	MPC · JPL
141P/Machholz 2-B (141P/Machholz 2-H)	5.34	0.736	3.056	13.950	–	–	20.3	–	
141P/Machholz 2-C	5.35	0.736	3.058	13.879	–	–	–	–	
141P/Machholz 2-D	5.34	0.736	3.056	13.943	–	12.5	19.6	–	JPL ·
141P/Machholz 2-E	4.91	0.738	2.888	12.979	–	–	–	–	
141P/Machholz 2-F (fragment of D)	5.35	0.736	3.060	13.801	–	–	–	–	
141P/Machholz 2-G (fragment of D)	5.50	0.753	3.117	12.832	–	–	–	–	

=== 205P/Giacobini ===
back to main list

This is a list of 205P/Giacobini (4 entries) with all its cometary fragments listed at JPL's SBDB (see list).

Comet designation	Period (years)	e	a (AU)	i (°)	J_{Tiss}	M1	M2	Diam.	Ref
205P/Giacobini	6.68	0.567	3.548	15.286	2.779	13.0	?	–	MPC · JPL
205P/Giacobini-A	6.66	0.569	3.539	15.305	2.779	12.0	15.7	–	JPL
205P/Giacobini-B	6.84	0.575	3.603	15.405	2.756	18.5	?	–	JPL
205P/Giacobini-C	6.66	0.569	3.540	15.309	2.779	–	–	–	JPL

=== 213P/Van Ness ===
back to main list

This is a list of 213P/Van Ness (2 entries) with all its cometary fragments listed at JPL's SBDB (see list).

Comet designation	Period (years)	e	a (AU)	i (°)	J_{Tiss}	M1	M2	Diam.	Ref
213P/Van Ness	6.34	0.382	3.426	10.266	2.994	11.0	14.1	–	MPC · JPL
213P/Van Ness-B	6.33	0.380	3.422	10.240	2.997	7.3	18.2	–	JPL

=== 240P/NEAT ===
back to main list

This is a list of 240P/NEAT (2 entries) with all its cometary fragments listed at JPL's SBDB (see list).

Comet designation	Period (years)	e	a (AU)	i (°)	J_{Tiss}	M1	M2	Diam.	Ref
240P/NEAT	7.61	0.4498	3.868	23.52	2.758	11.8	13.1	2.665 km	MPC · JPL
240P/NEAT-B	7.58	0.4504	3.860	23.53	2.758	7.3	–	–	JPL

=== 332P/Ikeya–Murakami ===
back to main list

This is a list of 332P/Ikeya–Murakami (10 entries) with all its cometary fragments listed at JPL's SBDB (see list).

Comet designation	Period (years)	e	a (AU)	i (°)	J_{Tiss}	M1	M2	Diam.	Ref
332P/Ikeya–Murakami	5.42	0.489	3.087	9.378	3.012	5.2	12.5	–	MPC · JPL
332P/Ikeya–Murakami-A	5.42	0.490	3.086	9.387	3.010	16.9	19.3	–	JPL
332P/Ikeya–Murakami-B	5.41	0.490	3.083	9.382	3.012	16.5	20.8	–	JPL
332P/Ikeya–Murakami-C	5.42	0.490	3.086	9.386	3.010	5.2	12.5	–	JPL
332P/Ikeya–Murakami-D	5.41	0.490	3.083	9.379	3.011	19.5	?	–	JPL
332P/Ikeya–Murakami-E	5.43	0.491	3.088	9.388	3.010	?	22.5	–	JPL
332P/Ikeya–Murakami-F	5.61	0.499	3.158	9.519	2.980	?	22.1	–	JPL
332P/Ikeya–Murakami-G	5.36	0.494	3.063	9.273	3.016	20.6	?	–	JPL
332P/Ikeya–Murakami-H	5.42	0.490	3.087	9.387	3.010	18.9	?	–	JPL
332P/Ikeya–Murakami-I	5.41	0.490	3.083	9.380	3.012	?	21.7	–	JPL

== See also ==
- List of interstellar comets
- List of comets by type
  - List of periodic comets
  - List of Halley-type comets
  - List of long-period comets
  - List of near-parabolic comets
  - List of parabolic and hyperbolic comets
  - List of Kreutz sungrazers
  - List of comets with no meaningful orbit
