= 475P/Spacewatch–LINEAR =

Jupiter-family comet

Discovery
- Discovered by: Spacewatch; LINEAR
- Discovery date: 17 February 2004

Designations
- MPC designation: P/2004 DO_{29} P/2023 V7

Orbital characteristics
- Epoch: 21 November 2025 (JD 2461000.5)
- Observation arc: 21.35 years (Note: Observation arc from the Minor Planet Center database covering dates from 11 February 2004 until 19 June 2025.)
- Earliest precovery date: 11 February 2004
- Number of observations: 164
- Aphelion: 10.563 AU
- Perihelion: 4.077 AU
- Semi-major axis: 7.320 AU
- Eccentricity: 0.44302
- Orbital period: 19.806 years
- Inclination: 14.524°
- Longitude of ascending node: 147.35°
- Argument of periapsis: 40.424°
- Mean anomaly: 26.734°
- Last perihelion: 1 June 2024
- Next perihelion: ~2043
- T_{Jupiter}: 2.772
- Earth MOID: 3.107 AU
- Jupiter MOID: 0.657 AU

Physical characteristics
- Mean radius: 1.07 ± 0.09 km (0.665 ± 0.056 mi)
- Mean density: 640±100 kg/m^{3}
- Comet total magnitude (M1): 7.0
- Comet nuclear magnitude (M2): 13.7

Comet Spacewatch–LINEAR, also known as 475P/Spacewatch–LINEAR, is a distant Jupiter-family comet with a roughly 20-year orbit around the Sun. It is one of several comets discovered by the Spacewatch and Lincoln Near-Earth Asteroid Research (LINEAR) surveys.

== Observational history ==
An apparently asteroid-like object both discovered by Spacewatch and LINEAR in 17 February 2004 was later found to have cometary activity after a 5 arcsecond-wide coma was detected upon review of photographic plates on 16 March 2004. Precovery images as early as 11 February 2004 were known. Observations conducted at the Galileo National Telescope in spring 2005 showed a well-developed coma and long tail even as the comet is well on its outbound trajectory at a distance of 4.22 AU (631 million km) from the Sun.

The comet was accidentally recovered from images taken by Pan-STARRS on 25 November 2023, with additional independent observations from the Calar Alto Observatory and Tenerife Observatory were also reported. It later received its official numerical designation (475P) alongside ten other periodic comets on April 2024.

== Notes ==
Numbered comets
Previous; 474P/Hogan	475P/Spacewatch–LINEAR	Next; 476P/PanSTARRS
