= 271P/van Houten–Lemmon =

Periodic comet

Discovery
- Discovered by: Cornelius J. van Houten; Ingrid G. van Houten
- Discovery site: Palomar Observatory
- Discovery date: 24 September 1960 (Note: The comet's discovery were announced in 31 March 1966, six years after it was observed.)

Designations
- MPC designation: D/1960 S1; P/2012 TB_{36}
- Alternative designations: 1961 X

Orbital characteristics
- Epoch: 7 July 2013 (JD 2456480.5)
- Observation arc: 54.32 years (Note: Observation arc from the JPL Small-Body Database covering dates from 24 September 1960 until 20 January 2015.)
- Number of observations: 96
- Aphelion: 9.714 AU
- Perihelion: 4.249 AU
- Semi-major axis: 6.982 AU
- Eccentricity: 0.39135
- Orbital period: 18.447 yr
- Inclination: 6.855°
- Longitude of ascending node: 9.584°
- Argument of periapsis: 35.135°
- Mean anomaly: 0.063°
- Last perihelion: 5 July 2013
- Next perihelion: 22 March 2032
- T_{Jupiter}: 2.862
- Earth MOID: 3.262 AU
- Jupiter MOID: 0.149 AU

Physical characteristics
- Mean radius: 14.8 km (9.2 mi)
- Comet total magnitude (M1): 7.2
- Comet nuclear magnitude (M2): 14.1

271P/van Houten–Lemmon (previously P/1960 S1 and P/2012 TB_{36}) is a Jupiter-family comet discovered in March 1966 by Cornelis Johannes van Houten and Ingrid van Houten-Groeneveld on eight Palomar plates taken by Tom Gehrels between 24 September and 26 October 1960 as a hazy object of 17th magnitude. It was considered lost and designated D/1960 S1 until recovered by the Mount Lemmon Survey on 17 September 2012.

== Bibliography ==
- "Reports on the Progress of Astronomy: Comets". Quarterly Journal of the Royal Astronomical Society. 8: 274. September 1967. Bibcode:1967QJRAS...8..274.
- Roemer, Elizabeth (December 1966). "Comet Notes". Publications of the Astronomical Society of the Pacific. 78 (466): 556. Bibcode:1966PASP...78..555R. doi:10.1086/128418.

Numbered comets
Previous; 270P/Gehrels	271P/van Houten–Lemmon	Next; 272P/NEAT
