= 243P/NEAT =

Jupiter-family comet

Discovery
- Discovered by: Near-Earth Asteroid Tracking (NEAT)
- Discovery date: 24 September 2003

Designations
- MPC designation: P/2003 S2; P/2010 P5
- Alternative designations: NEAT 17

Orbital characteristics
- Epoch: 9 June 2026 (JD 2461200.5)
- Observation arc: 23.06 years (Note: Observation arc from the Minor Planet Center database covering dates from 1 August 2003 until 24 August 2026.)
- Earliest precovery date: 1 August 2003
- Number of observations: 858
- Aphelion: 5.202 AU
- Perihelion: 2.448 AU
- Semi-major axis: 3.825 AU
- Eccentricity: 0.35997
- Orbital period: 7.480 years
- Inclination: 7.645°
- Longitude of ascending node: 87.574°
- Argument of periapsis: 283.79°
- Mean anomaly: 13.623°
- Last perihelion: 25 February 2026
- Next perihelion: 11 September 2033
- T_{Jupiter}: 2.944
- Earth MOID: 1.469 AU
- Jupiter MOID: 0.604 AU

Physical characteristics
- Mean radius: 0.81–1.55 km (0.50–0.96 mi)
- Geometric albedo: 0.04 (assumed)
- Comet total magnitude (M1): 9.9
- Comet nuclear magnitude (M2): 14.8

243P/NEAT is a Jupiter-family comet currently with a 7.49-year orbit around the Sun.

== Physical characteristics ==
In 2008, Elena M. Epifani observed the comet while it was inactive at a distance of 4.0 AU (600 million km), where she estimated that the nucleus has an effective radius of 0.81–1.55 km (0.50–0.96 mi), assuming that it has a geometric albedo of 0.04. Yanga R. Fernández estimated a revised upper limit of approximately 0.6 km (0.37 mi) based on Spitzer thermal observations in 2013. Michael S. P. Kelley stated that both results can be simultaneously true if the comet has an axial ratio of a/b > 1.3, which is a modest value for typical cometary nuclei.

== Notes ==
Numbered comets
Previous; 242P/Spahr	243P/NEAT	Next; 244P/Scotti
