= 414P/STEREO =

Jupiter-family comet

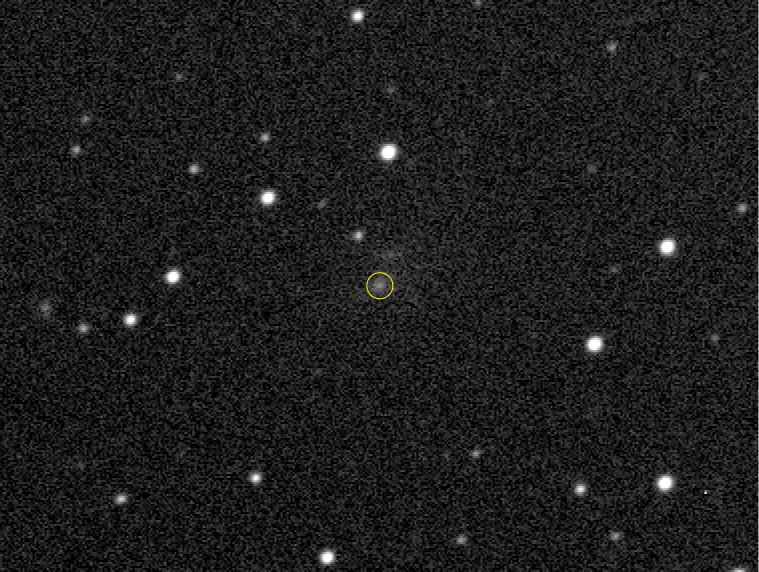
- The comet imaged from the Zwicky Transient Facility on 9 January 2021

Discovery
- Discovered by: STEREO-A; Scott Ferguson, et al.
- Discovery date: 11 May 2016

Designations
- MPC designation: P/2016 J3, P/2021 A3

Orbital characteristics
- Epoch: 21 November 2025 (JD 2461000.5)
- Observation arc: 9.37 years (Note: Observation arc from the Minor Planet Center database covering dates from 11 May 2016 until 23 September 2025.)
- Number of observations: 303
- Aphelion: 5.060 AU
- Perihelion: 0.524 AU
- Semi-major axis: 2.792 AU
- Eccentricity: 0.81229
- Orbital period: 4.666 years
- Inclination: 23.407°
- Longitude of ascending node: 257.81°
- Argument of periapsis: 210.71°
- Mean anomaly: 11.763°
- Last perihelion: 26 September 2025
- Next perihelion: 28 May 2030
- T_{Jupiter}: 2.648
- Earth MOID: 0.319 AU
- Jupiter MOID: 0.841 AU

Physical characteristics
- Mean radius: 0.51 km (0.32 mi)
- Comet total magnitude (M1): 20.5

414P/STEREO is a faint Jupiter-family comet with a 4.67-year orbit around the Sun. It is the most recent of the nine comets discovered by the STEREO spacecraft, (Note: Comets discovered by the twin STEREO spacecraft include; C/2008 D1, C/2008 D2, C/2008 D3, C/2008 D4, C/2008 E5, C/2008 E6, C/2009 G1, and C/2014 C2.) and one of the first comets recovered with assistance from AI programming. It last came to perihelion in September 2025 and will come to perihelion again in May 2030.

== Physical characteristics ==
Infrared observations from both NEOWISE and the Spitzer Space Telescope yielded an upper limit for the comet's nucleus to be around 1.02 km (0.63 mi) in diameter.
