= 240P/NEAT =

Jupiter-family comet

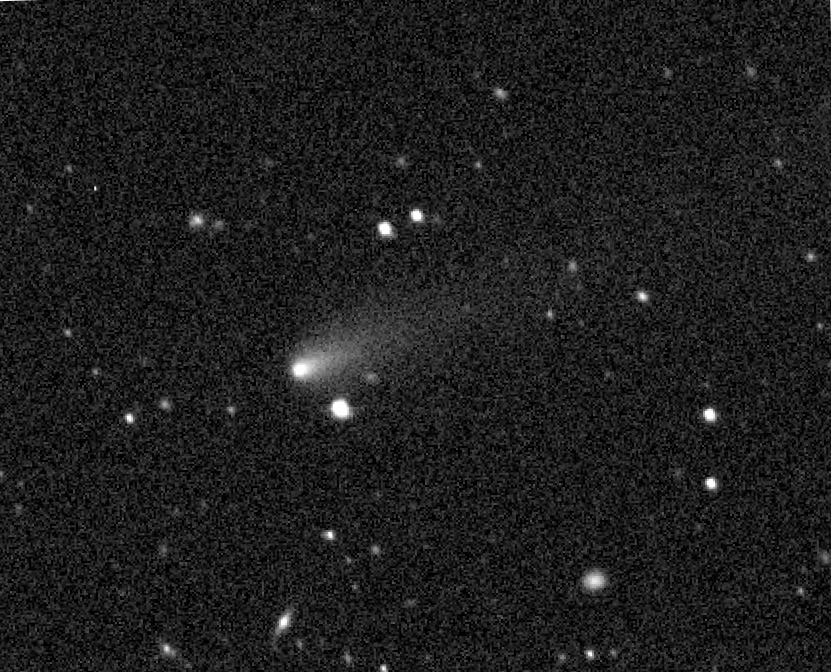
- Comet 240P/NEAT photographed from the Zwicky Transient Facility on 12 December 2018.

Discovery
- Discovered by: K. J. Lawrence
- Discovery site: NEAT–Palomar
- Discovery date: 7 December 2002

Designations
- MPC designation: P/2002 X2, P/2010 P1
- Alternative designations: NEAT 12

Orbital characteristics
- Epoch: 21 November 2025 (JD 2461000.5)
- Observation arc: 23.64 years (Note: Observation arc from the Minor Planet Center database covering dates from 5 October 2002 until 26 May 2026.)
- Earliest precovery date: 5 October 2002
- Number of observations: 7,754
- Aphelion: 5.602 AU
- Perihelion: 2.12163 AU (A); 2.12167 AU (B)
- Semi-major axis: 3.861 AU
- Eccentricity: 0.4506
- Orbital period: 7.59 years
- Inclination: 23.54°
- Longitude of ascending node: 74.91°
- Argument of periapsis: 352.08°
- Last perihelion: 19 December 2025 (A+B)
- Next perihelion: 5 July 2033 (B+A)
- T_{Jupiter}: 2.758 (A+B)
- Earth MOID: 1.145 AU (A); 1.137 AU (B)
- Jupiter MOID: 0.242 AU (A); 0.235 AU (B)

Physical characteristics
- Mean radius: 2.665 km (1.656 mi) (Note: Estimated size of the original nucleus is approximately 5.33 km (3.31 mi) in diameter based on NEOWISE observations before fragmenting around October 2025.) Fragments: (A) = 0.2–0.3 km (0.12–0.19 mi); (B) = 0.025–0.15 km (0.016–0.093 mi)
- Comet total magnitude (M1): 10.3
- Apparent magnitude: 12.0 (2025-11-20)

240P/NEAT is a Jupiter-family comet with an orbital period of 7.61 years. It was discovered by Near Earth Asteroid Tracking (NEAT) on 7 December 2002.

The comet came opposition on 22 November 2025, and came to perihelion on 19 December 2025 when it was around magnitude 12-13.

== Observational history ==
The comet at discovery had an apparent magnitude of 18.4, and further observations revealed it had a coma about 8 arcseconds across and a tail 14 arcseconds long. The comet was spotted in prediscovery images dating from 5 October and 6 December by LONEOS and from 5 November by NEAT. Based on these observations it was recognised it is a periodic comet with an orbital period of 8.1 years. The comet was recovered independently by H. Taylor, H. Sato, Leonid Elenin, and T. Yusa on 9, 10, 11, and 11 August 2010 respectively, at an estimated magnitude of around 17. It received its official numerical designation (240P) alongside six other comets on August 2010.

The comet had a close approach to Jupiter on 10 July 2007 at a distance of 0.252 AU (37.7 million km) which reduced the orbital period to 7.6 years and the perihelion distance from 2.5 to 2.1 AU. The comet experienced three events of significant brightening which last for three to six months during its next two perihelia, on March-April 2011, July-August 2017, and on November-December 2018. The events more likely are the result of the warming of previously insulated material due to the reduction of the perihelion distance. The new activity takes place in one or two locations of the nucleus.

== 240P-B ==
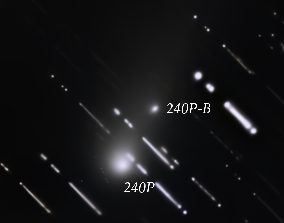
240P/NEAT with fragmant B on 27 November 2025

On 3 October 2025 fragment 240P-B was imaged by Kitt Peak and reported by V. Carvajal. 240P-B also came to perihelion on 19 December 2025, about 51 minutes after the main body and about 0.00004 AU (6,000 km; 3,700 mi) farther from the Sun.

2025 perihelion passage
Fragment	Perihelion time	Perihelion distance
240P-A	2025-Dec-19 22:52	2.12163 AU (317,391,000 km; 197,218,000 mi)
240P-B	2025-Dec-19 23:43	2.12167 AU (317,397,000 km; 197,222,000 mi)

The separation (∼10^{8} m) and the rate of change of the separation (∼1 m s−1) of 240P-A from 240P-B point to splitting of the precursor nucleus at least three years before the present observations. The radius of 240P-B is uncertain, with a best estimate ∼300 m and an absolute lower limit 50 m. The mass loss of 240P-B peaked at ∼35 kg s−1 around perihelion, and the total ejected mass was 2.3×10^{8} kg. The likely cause of the splitting is rotational instability triggered by outgassing torques. Both 240P-A and 240P-B are liable to further breakup and destruction by rotational instability on timescales that are shorter than the timescale due to sublimation mass loss.

== Notes ==
Numbered comets
Previous; 239P/LINEAR	240P/NEAT	Next; 241P/LINEAR
