= 412P/WISE =

Encke-type comet

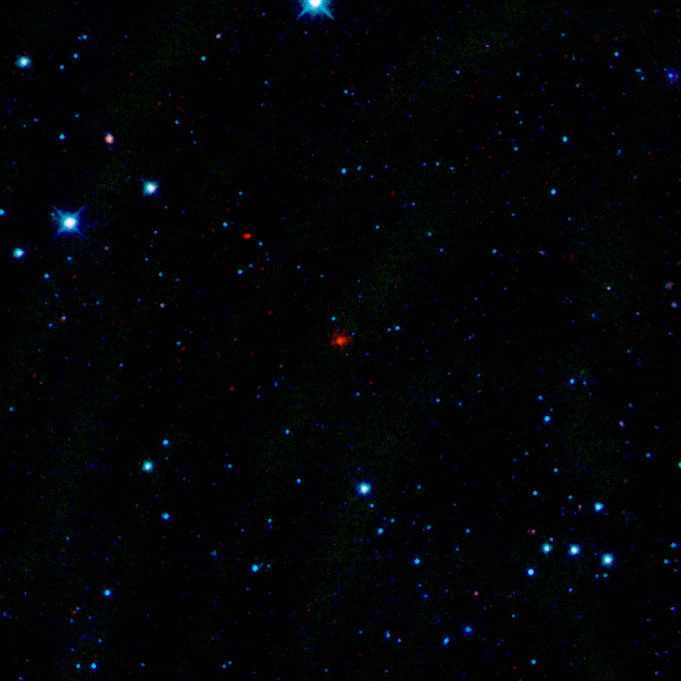
- Discovery image of the comet (center) taken by WISE on 22 January 2010

Discovery
- Discovered by: WISE
- Discovery date: 22 January 2010

Designations
- MPC designation: P/2010 B2, P/2020 Y1
- Alternative designations: WISE 1

Orbital characteristics
- Epoch: 17 December 2020 (JD 2459200.5)
- Observation arc: 11.11 years
- Number of observations: 74
- Aphelion: 4.603 AU
- Perihelion: 1.618 AU
- Semi-major axis: 3.110 AU
- Eccentricity: 0.47994
- Orbital period: 5.485 years
- Inclination: 8.931°
- Longitude of ascending node: 0.849°
- Argument of periapsis: 155.92°
- Mean anomaly: 2.088°
- Last perihelion: 30 May 2026
- Next perihelion: 28 November 2031
- T_{Jupiter}: 3.013
- Earth MOID: 0.625 AU
- Jupiter MOID: 0.432 AU

Physical characteristics
- Mean radius: 0.495 km (0.308 mi)
- Comet total magnitude (M1): 15.2
- Comet nuclear magnitude (M2): 19.1

412P/WISE is an Encke-type comet with a 5.5-year orbit around the Sun. It is the first of many comets discovered by the Wide-field Infrared Survey Explorer (WISE), and has since been followed by ground observatories, among them the Mauna Kea Observatory.

== Orbit ==
The comet has an orbital period of 5.49 years, an aphelion of 4.6 AU (690 million km) and a perihelion of 1.62 AU (242 million km).

Numbered comets
Previous; 411P/Christensen	412P/WISE	Next; 413P/Larson
