= 455P/PanSTARRS =

Encke-type comet

Discovery
- Discovered by: Pan-STARRS
- Discovery site: Haleakala Observatory
- Discovery date: 30 September 2017

Designations
- MPC designation: P/2011 Q5; P/2017 S9; P/2022 R7
- Alternative designations: PanSTARRS 71, P10E2ep

Orbital characteristics
- Epoch: 25 February 2023 (JD 2460000.5)
- Observation arc: 11.03 years
- Earliest precovery date: 21 August 2011
- Number of observations: 71
- Aphelion: 4.119 AU
- Perihelion: 2.192 AU
- Semi-major axis: 3.155 AU
- Orbital period: 5.604 years
- Inclination: 14.138°
- Longitude of ascending node: 146.21°
- Argument of periapsis: 237.57°
- Mean anomaly: 359.92°
- Last perihelion: 25 February 2023
- Next perihelion: 1 October 2028
- T_{Jupiter}: 3.088
- Earth MOID: 1.234 AU
- Jupiter MOID: 1.556 AU

Physical characteristics
- Mean radius: 0.5±0.2 km
- Comet total magnitude (M1): 9.4

455P/PanSTARRS is an Encke-type comet that completes a 5.6-year orbit around the Sun within the main asteroid belt. It is also considered an active asteroid, whose orbit suggested it may belong to the Theobalda collisional family.

== Observational history ==
Robert Weryk reported the discovery of this comet from the CCD exposures taken by the Haleakala Observatory's PanSTARRS 1 telescope on 30 September 2017, with precovery observations found as far back as 19 September of that year. Following its announcement at the Minor Planet Center's PCCP report, follow-up observations from various observatories around the globe until October 2017 confirm the object's cometary nature, with an elongated coma and a fairly short tail about 10 arcseconds across. Further astrometric measurements of recorded observations at the time later determined that the orbit of this new comet, previously known as P/2017 S9, is periodic with an orbital period of about 5.6 years.

It was successfully recovered in 2022, a year ahead of its next apparition in 2023 as P/2022 R7, with precovery observations as early as 2011 were found, however with little to no cometary activity. The comet later received its official numerical designation (455P) alongside eight other comets on February 2023.

Numbered comets
Previous; 454P/PanSTARRS	455P/PanSTARRS	Next; 456P/PanSTARRS
