= 479P/Elenin =

Jupiter-family comet

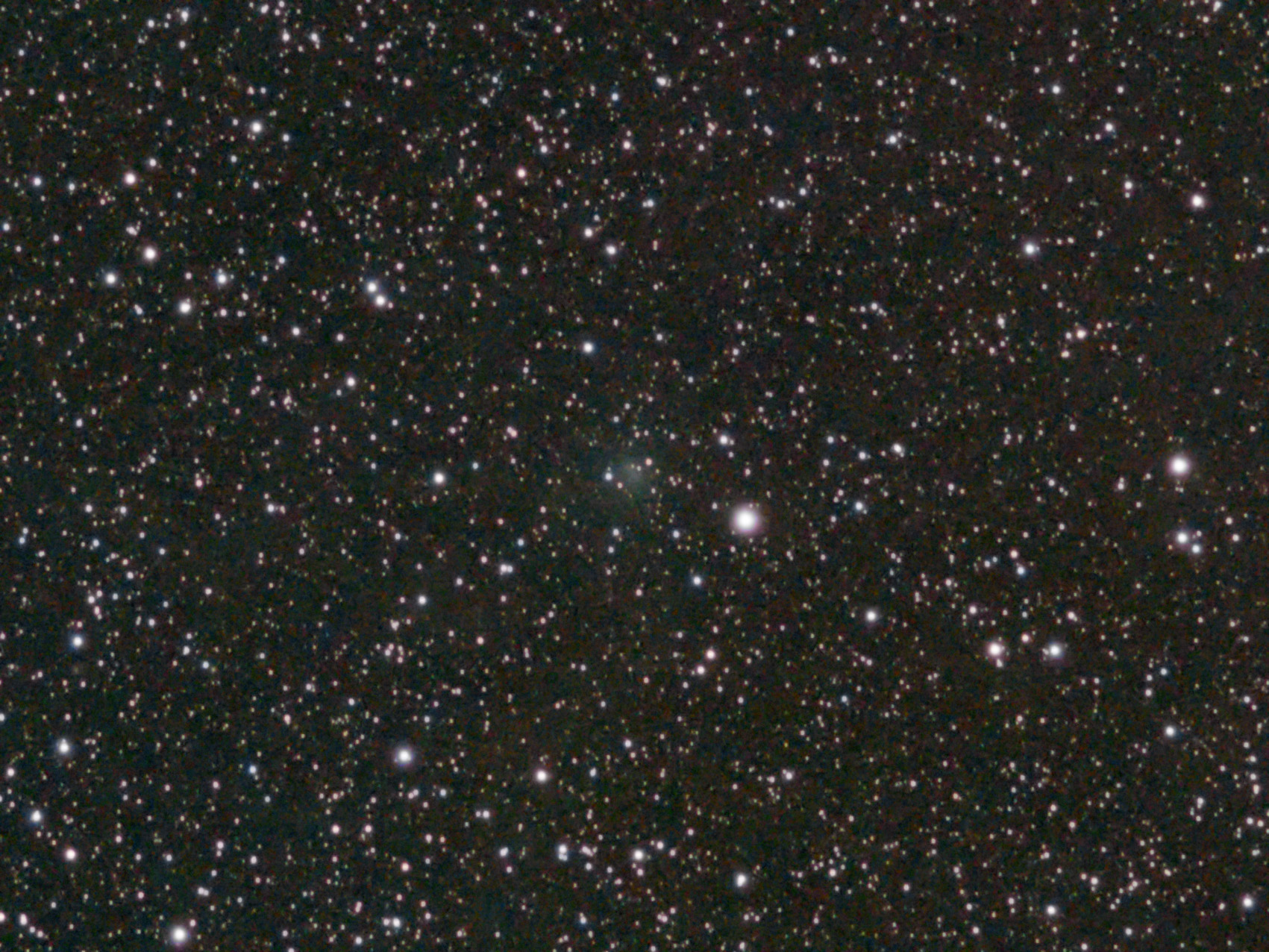
- Comet 479P/Elenin photographed on 10 April 2024

Discovery
- Discovered by: Leonid Elenin
- Discovery site: ISON–NM (H15); 0.45-m reflector
- Discovery date: 7 July 2011

Designations
- MPC designation: P/2011 NO_{1} P/2023 WM_{26}
- Alternative designations: Elenin 1

Orbital characteristics
- Epoch: 21 November 2025 (JD 2461000.5)
- Observation arc: 13.148 years
- Earliest precovery date: 12 June 2011
- Number of observations: 1,013
- Aphelion: 10.002 AU
- Perihelion: 1.243 AU
- Semi-major axis: 5.623 AU
- Eccentricity: 0.77898
- Orbital period: 13.332 years
- Inclination: 15.399°
- Longitude of ascending node: 295.83°
- Argument of periapsis: 263.49°
- Mean anomaly: 41.745°
- Last perihelion: 5 May 2024
- Next perihelion: 10 September 2037
- T_{Jupiter}: 2.183
- Earth MOID: 0.383 AU
- Jupiter MOID: 0.903 AU

Physical characteristics
- Mean radius: 1.0 km (0.62 mi)
- Comet total magnitude (M1): 16.2

479P/Elenin, provisional designation P/2011 NO_{1}, is a Jupiter-family comet with an orbital period estimated at 13.3 years. It is the second of five comets discovered by Russian astronomer, Leonid Elenin.

== Observational history ==
The comet was discovered on 7 July 2011 when the comet was 2.38 AU from the Sun and 1.4 AU from the Earth and had an apparent magnitude of 19.5. It had come to perihelion (closest approach to the Sun) around 20 January 2011 at 1.2 AU (180 million km) from the Sun. It came to opposition 178.6° from the Sun on 22 July 2011 in the constellation Sagittarius.

On 29 January 2013, the Minor Planet Center awarded Leonid Elenin a 2012 Edgar Wilson Award for the discovery of comets by amateurs.

Maik Meyer proposed that asteroid 2023 WM_{26}, which was discovered by PanSTARRS on 18 November 2023, is the return of P/2011 NO_{1} (Elenin). The link was later confirmed by Shuichi Nakano and Daniel Green. The 2024 apparition was the most favorable in decades, with the comet approaching 0.62 AU (93 million km) to Earth on 4 May 2024, one day before perihelion. The comet appeared gasy and diffuse and brightened to an apparent magnitude of 10 to 11.

== Physical characteristics ==
The radius of the nucleus is estimated to be less than 1.0 km (0.62 mi).

Numbered comets
Previous; 478P/ATLAS	479P/Elenin	Next; 480P/PanSTARRS
