= 2009 DQ118 =

Active main belt asteroid

2009 DQ_{118}
Discovery (Note: Discoverer not yet assigned by the MPC)
- Discovery date: 27 February 2009 (Initial reported obs.)

Designations
- Minor planet category: Outer main belt

Orbital characteristics
- Epoch 21 November 2025 (JD 2461000.5)
- Uncertainty parameter 0
- Aphelion: 4.7164 AU
- Perihelion: 2.4288 AU
- Semi-major axis: 3.5726 AU
- Eccentricity: 0.3202
- Orbital period (sidereal): 6.7527 y (2466.4 d)
- Mean anomaly: 137.783°
- Mean motion: 0.1460° / d
- Inclination: 9.3931°
- Longitude of ascending node: 344.652°
- Argument of perihelion: 252.059°
- Jupiter MOID: 0.8036 AU
- T_{Jupiter}: 3.005

Physical characteristics
- Absolute magnitude (H): 16.96

2009 DQ_{118} is an unnamed active asteroid located in the outer main asteroid belt. It was initially reported on 27 February 2009 by the Spacewatch survey at Steward Observatory in Tucson, Arizona, United States. Classified as a quasi-Hilda object, 2009 DQ_{118}'s orbit is strongly perturbed by frequent close encounters with Jupiter. It exhibits comet-like activity, which was first observed in March 2016 and identified by volunteers working for the Active Asteroids project. As of 2025, it has not received a number from the Minor Planet Center.

== Orbit ==
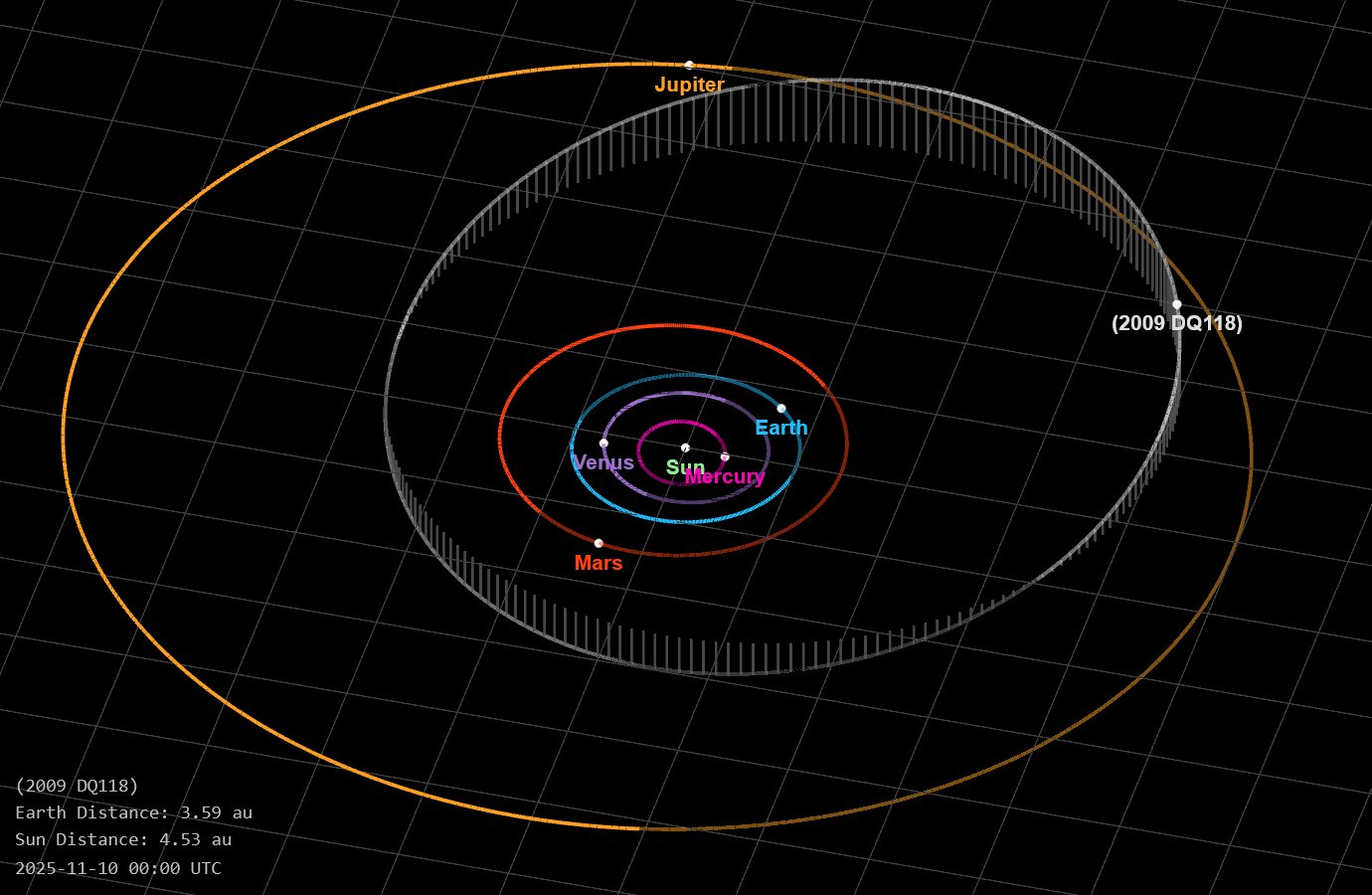
Diagram of 2009 DQ_{118}'s orbit in the outer main belt, near the orbit of Jupiter.

2009 DQ_{118} orbits the Sun at an average distance—its semi-major axis—of 3.57 astronomical units (AU), placing it in the outer main asteroid belt. Along its 6.75 year long orbit, its distance from the Sun varies between 2.43 AU at perihelion to 4.72 AU at aphelion due to its orbital eccentricity of 0.32. Its orbit is inclined by 9.39° with respect to the ecliptic plane.

2009 DQ_{118} is a member of a dynamical group of objects called the quasi-Hildas. The quasi-Hildas reside near, but do not participate in, the 2:3 mean-motion resonance (MMR) with Jupiter. Unlike the Hilda asteroids, which are defined as participating in the 2:3 Jovian MMR, quasi-Hildas are dynamically unstable. 2009 DQ_{118} experiences frequent close encounters with Jupiter, often coming as close as 2–3 Jupiter Hill radii (0.68–1.02 AU) to the planet.

As of 2025, its Tisserand parameter with respect to Jupiter (T_{J}) is 3.005, just above the T_{J} = 3 boundary used by astronomers to distinguish Jupiter-crossing comets and asteroids. Objects with T_{J} < 3 are considered Jupiter-crossing comets, whereas those with T_{J} > 3 are considered asteroids. 2009 DQ_{118}'s close encounters with Jupiter significantly alter its orbit, causing it to frequently cross the T_{J} = 3 boundary—up to dozens of times over the course of 1,000 years. Though currently in an asteroid-like orbit, in the past it was likely a Jupiter-family comet (JFC) or a centaur. According to numerical simulations performed in 2023, it will once again become a JFC 1,000 years in the future. Thereafter, it is likely to remain a JFC or become a centaur, though there is a small chance that it will transition back to an asteroid-like orbit or even become a near-Earth object.

== Activity ==
2009 DQ_{118} shows comet-like activity, which was first identified by citizen science volunteers working for the Active Asteroids project. Observations taken in 8–11 March 2016, four months before 2009 DQ_{118}'s 2016 perihelion passage, showed a tail. Follow-up observations were conducted using the Apache Point Observatory's 3.5-m Astrophysical Research Consortium (ARC) telescope on 24 February 2023. At that time, 2009 DQ_{118} was approaching perihelion. Despite poor observing conditions, a faint tail was spotted, and further observations were carried out using Las Campanas Observatory's 6.5-m Walter Baade Magellan Telescope on 22 April, at 2009 DQ_{118}'s perihelion. The 22 April observations also showed a faint tail. The timing of 2009 DQ_{118}'s periods of activity with its perihelion passages suggests that its activity is likely driven by the sublimation of volatile ices.

== See also ==
Other active asteroids identified by the Active Asteroids project:

- 6478 Gault
- (62412) 2000 SY178
- (323137) 2003 BM80
