= 249P/LINEAR =

Periodic comet

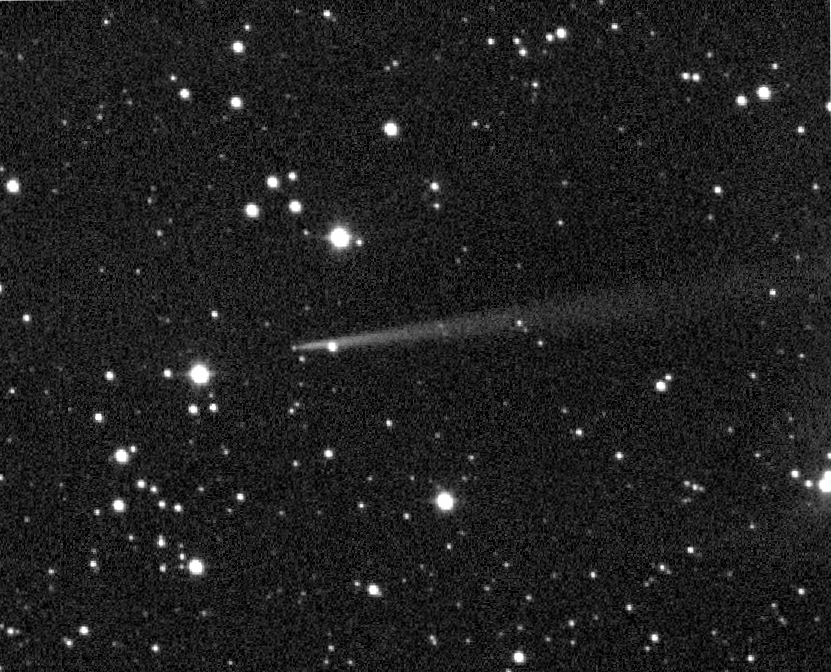
- Comet 249P/LINEAR photographed from the Zwicky Transient Facility on 31 July 2020

Discovery
- Discovery site: LINEAR
- Discovery date: 19 October 2006

Designations
- MPC designation: P/2006 U1, P/2011 A4

Orbital characteristics
- Epoch: 25 February 2023 (JD 2460000.5)
- Observation arc: 14.25 years
- Number of observations: 924
- Aphelion: 5.029 AU
- Perihelion: 0.498 AU
- Semi-major axis: 2.770 AU
- Eccentricity: 0.81965
- Orbital period: 4.595 years
- Inclination: 8.386°
- Longitude of ascending node: 239.07°
- Argument of periapsis: 65.740°
- Mean anomaly: 208.21°
- Last perihelion: 1 February 2025
- Next perihelion: 21 September 2029
- T_{Jupiter}: 2.707
- Earth MOID: 0.048 AU
- Jupiter MOID: 0.746 AU

Physical characteristics
- Mean diameter: 2.0–2.6 km (1.2–1.6 mi)
- Geometric albedo: 0.04–0.07
- Comet total magnitude (M1): 18.4
- Comet nuclear magnitude (M2): 17.0±0.4

249P/LINEAR is a Jupiter-family comet with an orbital period of 4.61 years. It was discovered by LINEAR on 19 October 2006. It is only active for a brief period around perihelion.

== Observational history ==
The comet was at first reported as an asteroidal object with an apparent magnitude of 17.3 by LINEAR on 19 October 2006. However it was quickly found to be cometary in appearance, with a narrow tail up to 12 arcminutes long and a coma 10 arcseconds across. On 21 October the tail appeared almost disconnected from the head of the comet. A preliminary orbit suggested a short period object with an orbital period of 4.33 years. The comet was recovered on 14 January 2011 by Leonid Elenin using a remote observatory of ISON, when it had an apparent magnitude of 19–19.5.

249P/LINEAR has frequently passed through the fields of view of various solar observatories when near perihelion. Its most favorable apparition to date came in 2020 (perihelion 29 June) when it was successfully observed by SOHO from 16–21 June, Parker Solar Probe on 28 June, and STEREO-A from 2–16 July. In addition, it was well observed by STEREO-A in April 2011 and was not detected by SOHO despite highly favorable viewing geometry in May 1997.

During the 2020 apparition, the comet appeared to lack a central condensation in images obtained in 20 and 21 July and with an apparent magnitude of 15 it was fainter than predicted, leading to speculation that the comet disintegrated.

On 3 November 2029, the comet will approach Earth to a distance of 0.057 AU (8.5 million km) with a relative speed of 26.93 km/s (16.73 mi/s).

== Scientific results ==
The comet has an absolute (visual) nuclear magnitude of 17.0±0.4 which corresponds to a radius of 1.0–1.3 km (0.62–0.81 mi) assuming an albedo of 0.04–0.07. The reflection spectrum is similar to that of a B-type asteroid when the comet is near perihelion, but it is weakly red when it is less active, like a typical C-type asteroid, and it appears featureless.

The current orbit suggests that the orbit has been stable in the near-Earth space for about 10,000 years. It is possible that it originates from the main asteroid belt. The perihelion distance appears to be slightly decreasing, meaning that it is at or near its warmest stage for the last few thousands years. It is possible that the comet is dynamically linked with the Taurid complex, which was created by Comet Encke.

Observations of the comet during the 2006 and 2016 apparitions indicate that it is active for about 20 days around perihelion, with a dust production rate up to 145±50 kg/s and a total mass loss of (2.5±0.9)×10^{8} kg, which is low when compared with other Jupiter-family comets, indicating that it is depleted in volatiles. It may be near the end of its active phase and evolve to a mostly inactive body, like 3200 Phaethon.

In 2019, Ignacio Ferrin proposed that 249P/LINEAR, alongside other main-belt comets like 133P/Elst-Pizarro, 331P/Gibbs, (62412) 2000 SY178 and 6478 Gault be reclassified into a new subgroup of active asteroids called the "pinpoint comets" group (PCG).

== Meteor showers ==
The comet has been associated with the weak 68 Virginids meteor shower (#651). The shower is also known as the October α-Virginids and was deteced by the cameras of CAMS and SonotaCo.

Numbered comets
Previous; 248P/Gibbs	249P/LINEAR	Next; 250P/Larson
