= D/1766 G1 (Helfenzrieder) =

Lost comet

Discovery
- Discovered by: Johann E. Helfenzrieder
- Discovery site: Dillingen, Germany
- Discovery date: 1 April 1766

Designations
- Alternative designations: 1766 II

Orbital characteristics
- Epoch: 3 May 1766 (JD 2366200.5)
- Observation arc: 24 days
- Number of observations: 22
- Aphelion: 4.923 AU
- Perihelion: 0.406 AU
- Semi-major axis: 2.665 AU
- Eccentricity: 0.84763
- Orbital period: ~4.35 years
- Inclination: 7.865°
- Longitude of ascending node: 76.263°
- Argument of periapsis: 178.699°
- Mean anomaly: 1.154°
- Last perihelion: 27 April 1766 (last known observation); 16 November 2021 (calculated)
- Next perihelion: 16 March 2026 (calculated)
- T_{Jupiter}: 2.705

Physical characteristics
- Mean radius: ~3.0–8.7 km (1.9–5.4 mi)
- Comet nuclear magnitude (M2): ~4.5–6.8
- Apparent magnitude: 4.0–5.0 (1766 apparition)

Comet Helfenzrieder, also known by its modern designation D/1766 G1, is a Jupiter-family comet that was first seen between April and May 1766. The comet was never recovered on its next apparitions and was subsequently considered lost.

== Orbit ==
Uncertainties in orbital calculations prevented the comet from being recovered on its next apparitions after 1766. Between 1766 and 1773, Alexandre Guy Pingré made the first parabolic orbits for comet Helfenzrieder, where his computations revealed a perihelion date of 17 April 1766 at a distance of 0.637 AU (95.3 million km), though he still considered this calculation uncertain. He later revised his calculations in 1784, where he determined that the comet might had reached perihelion on 23 April 1766 at a distance of 0.33 AU (49 million km).

Johann Karl Burckhardt was the first astronomer to determine that Helfenzrieder has a short period elliptical orbit in 1821, where he calculated the comet's orbital period to 5.02 years. In 1915, Carl Wilhelm Wirtz noted that three years before discovery, the comet made a close encounter with Jupiter on 11 November 1763 at a distance of 0.03 AU (4.5 million km).

The comet is likely a member of the Hephaistos group, a subset of the larger Taurid complex that also include 2P/Encke, 169P/NEAT, and P/2003 T_{12} (SOHO). Of all the near-Earth comets, Helfenzrieder has the highest probability of impacting Earth, however it is not clear if this comet still existed to the present day.

In March 2017, David A. J. Seargent identified that the asteroid 2017 DW_{108} has an orbit very similar to D/1766 G1 (Helfenzrieder), however the link between two objects is not yet definitely confirmed.
