= Active Asteroids (citizen science project) =

NSF-funded citizen science project

- Website type: Citizen science project
- Available in: English
- Website: www.zooniverse.org/projects/orionnau/active-asteroids
- Commercial: No
- Registration: Optional
- Launched: 31 August 2021; 5 years ago
- Current status: Online

Active Asteroids is a NASA partner citizen science project that successfully discovered active asteroids, including main-belt comets, quasi-Hilda objects, and Jupiter family comets. The project is hosted on the Zooniverse platform and is funded by a NSF Graduate Research Fellowship Program. It uses images from the Dark Energy Camera (DECam) to search for tails around asteroids and other minor planets. The research team is led by Colin Orion Chandler. As of April 2024 about 8300 volunteers carried out 6.7 million classifications of 430 thousand images. At the time only 60 active asteroids were known and 16 new active objects were discovered by this project, significantly increasing the sample of known objects.

The success of the project did result in the development of Rubin Comet Catchers, a citizen science project using data by the Vera C. Rubin Observatory and a similar approach as the Active Asteroids project.

== Pre-launch preparation ==
Before the team launched the project, the team gained experience with DECam and published three papers. These include detection of activity around previously known active asteroid (62412) 2000 SY_{178}, revealing 6 years of activity on 6478 Gault and activity discovered on the centaur 2014 OG_{392}.

== Discoveries ==
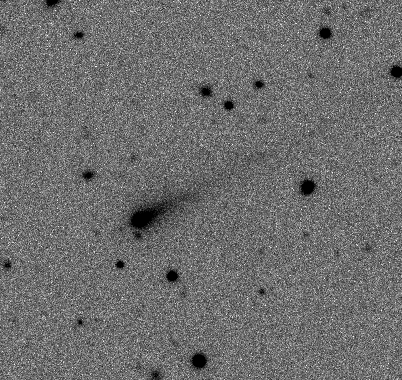
DECam image showing the activity on 282P, which was first identified by citizen scientists for this image.

The project uses a pipeline called HARVEST, which compares metadata from astronomical image archives with the data from the Minor Planet Center and produces images at positions of minor planets. It also excludes images with no detection or images that cannot detect asteroids. Since February 2024 the team also used a Convolutional Neural Network (CNN), called TailNet, to filter out bad images before they are shown to volunteers and to identify high-likely candidates. This CNN uses classification-labels made by the volunteers and is constantly improved with new classifications. One of the first discovery was made in September 2022, when the team published a paper describing that 282P/(323137) 2003 BM_{80} showed sustained activity over 15 months in 2021–2022. Activity was previously reported in 2012–2013 and the team analysed the orbit, finding that it is an outbursting quasi-Hilda object. The object 2010 LH15 was discovered to have cometary activity from DECam images by the Active Asteroids project. A follow-up study did find activity in images of the Zwicky Transient Facility and showed that the object had a radius of 1.11±0.02 km. The study also showed that the activity was likely due to sublimation. The activity did onset at 1.86 astronomical units (AU), which is closer than other main-belt comets. The researchers find that sublimating volatiles must be buried deeper than on other active asteroids showing sublimation.

=== List of discoveries ===
| Name | family | type of activity | year-month of discovery | Reference | Previous discovery of activity |
|---|---|---|---|---|---|
| 2015 TC_{1} | Jupiter-family comet | | 2022-01 | | no |
| 2017 QN_{84} | Jupiter-family comet | recurrently active, volatile sublimation | 2022-01 | | no |
| 282P | quasi-Hilda object (former Centaur or Jupiter-family comet) | volatile sublimation | 2013-06/2022-09 | | yes, Bolin et al. |
| 2015 FW_{412} | main-belt comet candidate | sublimation | 2023-02 | | no |
| 2015 VA_{108} | main-belt comet candidate | volatile sublimation | 2023-02 | | no |
| 2009 DQ_{118} | quasi-Hilda object (former Jupiter family comet or Centaur) | sublimation of volatile ices | 2023-03 | | no |
| 2010 LH_{15} (aka 2010 TJ_{175}) | main-belt comet | likely sublimation | 2023-03 | | no |
| (588045) 2007 FZ_{18} | main-belt comet candidate | two tails | 2023-05 | | no |
| 2018 CZ_{16} | quasi-Hilda object | thermally driven activity indicative of water-ice sublimation | 2023-05 | | no |
| 484P/Spacewatch | Jupiter-family comet | | 2021-04/2023-07 | | yes, Cheng et al. |
| 2004 CV_{50} | quasi-Hilda object | | 2023-11 | | no |
| (551023) 2012 UQ_{192} | Jupiter-family Comet | recurrently active, sublimation | 2023-12 | | no |
| 2019 OE_{31} | vacationing Centaur | volatile sublimation | 2023-12 | | no |
| 2008 QZ_{44} | Jupiter-family comet | | 2023-12 | | no |
| 2018 VL_{10} | Jupiter-family comet (Mars crossing) | | 2023-12 | | no |
| 2018 OR | Jupiter-family comet (Mars crossing) | | 2024-01 | | no |
| (410590) 2008 GB_{140} | main-belt comet candidate | | 2024-02 | TailNet identified activity | no |
| 2016 UU_{121} | main-belt comet candidate | | 2024-02 | TailNet identified activity | no |
| 2011 UG_{104} | Jupiter-family comet | | 2024-05 | TailNet identified activity | no |
| 2015 VP_{51} | Jupiter-family comet | suspected sublimation | 2024-09 | TailNet filtered, identified by citizen scientists | no |
| 2010 MK_{43} (aka 2010 RA_{78}) | Jupiter-family comet (former quasi-Hilda object) | | 2024-09 | TailNet filtered, identified by citizen scientists | no |
| (523822) 2012 DG_{61} | Near-Earth Comet and Apollo asteroid | recurrently active, likely sublimation | 2018-05/2025-01 | TailNet identified activity | previously observed by G. Borisov |

== See also ==
other citizen science projects researching minor planets:

- The Daily Minor Planet Active
- Asteroid Zoo inactive
- Stardust@home
- Catalina Outer Solar System Survey inactive

other citizen science projects

- Zooniverse citizen science platform
- BOINC volunteer computing platform
- Planet Hunters: exoplanet discovery project
- Backyard Worlds: brown dwarf discovery project
