= 171P/Spahr =

Jupiter-family comet

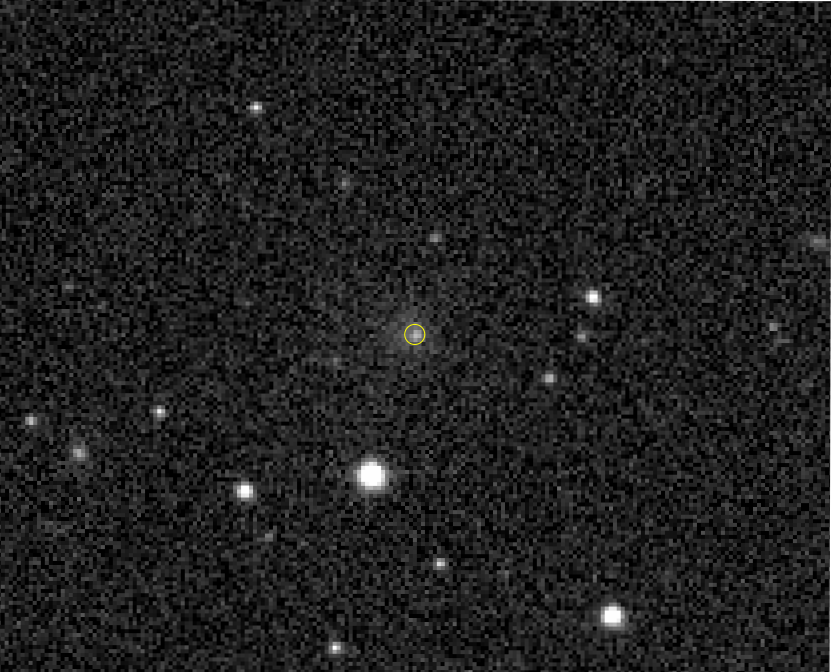
- Comet 171P/Spahr as seen from the Zwicky Transient Facility (ZTF) on 24 January 2019

Discovery
- Discovered by: Timothy B. Spahr
- Discovery date: 16 November 1998

Designations
- MPC designation: P/1998 W1, P/2005 R3

Orbital characteristics
- Epoch: 21 November 2025 (JD 2461000.5)
- Earliest precovery date: 13 November 1998
- Number of observations: 997
- Aphelion: 5.342 AU
- Perihelion: 1.764 AU
- Semi-major axis: 3.553 AU
- Eccentricity: 0.5033
- Orbital period: 6.70 a
- Inclination: 21.94°
- Last perihelion: 25 September 2025
- Next perihelion: 3 June 2032

Physical characteristics
- Mean radius: 1.25 km (0.78 mi)
- Mean density: 640±90 kg/m^{3}
- Comet total magnitude (M1): 11.6
- Comet nuclear magnitude (M2): 16.8

171P/Spahr is a periodic comet in the Solar System. 171P/Spahr was recovered on 20–24 October 2011 at apparent magnitude 20.6 using the 2.0-metre (79 in) Faulkes Telescope South. 171P/Spahr is peaked at about magnitude 18 in 2012.

During the 1999 passage, the comet brightened to about magnitude 13.5.

At perihelion on January 13, 2019, when the comet was 1AU from Earth, the 3-sigma uncertainty in the comet's Earth distance was ±500 km.

Numbered comets
Previous; 170P/Christensen	171P/Spahr	Next; 172P/Yeung
