= List of periodic comets =

Comets with orbital periods under 200 years

Periodic comets (also known as short-period comets) are comets with orbital periods of less than 200 years or that have been observed during more than a single perihelion passage (e.g. 153P/Ikeya–Zhang). "Periodic comet" is also sometimes used to mean any comet with a periodic orbit, even if greater than 200 years.

Periodic comets receive a permanent number prefix usually after the second perihelion passage, which is why there are a number of unnumbered periodic comets, such as P/2005 T5 (Broughton). Comets that are not observed after a number of perihelion passages, or presumed to be destroyed, are given the D designation, and likewise comets given a periodic number and subsequently lost are given [n]D instead of [n]P, such as 3D/Biela or 5D/Brorsen.

In nearly all cases, comets are named after their discoverers, but in a few cases such as 2P/Encke and 27P/Crommelin they were named for a person who determined their orbits. The long-term orbits of comets can be difficult to calculate due to errors in the known trajectory that can accumulate from perturbations from the planets. Even so, quite a few comets were lost because their orbits are also affected by non-gravitational effects such as the release of gas and other material that forms the comet's coma and tail. Unlike a long-period comet, the next perihelion passage of a numbered periodic comet can be predicted with a high degree of accuracy.

Periodic comets sometimes bear the same name repeatedly (e.g. the nine Shoemaker–Levy comets or the twenty-four NEAT comets); the IAU system distinguishes between them either through the number prefix or by the full designation (e. g. 181P and 192P/Shoemaker–Levy are both "Comet Shoemaker–Levy"). In the literature, an informal numbering system is applied to periodic comets (skipping the non-periodic ones), thus 181P and 192P are known as Comet Shoemaker–Levy 6 and Comet Shoemaker–Levy 1, respectively. Non-periodic Shoemaker–Levy comets are interleaved in this sequence: C/1991 B1 between 2 and 3, C/1991 T2 between 5 and 6, C/1993 K1 and C/1994 E2 after Shoemaker–Levy 9.

In comet nomenclature, the letter before the "/" is either "C" (a non-periodic comet), "P" (a periodic comet), "D" (a comet that has been lost or has disintegrated), "X" (a comet for which no reliable orbit could be calculated —usually historical comets), "I" for an interstellar object, or "A" for an object that was either mistakenly identified as a comet, but is actually a minor planet, or for an object on a hyperbolic orbit that does not show cometary activity. Some lists retain the "C" prefix for comets of periods larger than about 30 years until their return is confirmed.

== List of unnumbered Encke-type comets ==
Comet designation	Name/ discoverer(s)	Period (years)	e	a (AU)	q (AU)	i (°)	Abs. mag. (M1)	Radius of nucleus	Last observed perihelion	Next perihelion	Ref
D/1977 C1	Skiff–Kosai	7.54	0.2592	3.847	2.850	3.20	8.5		1976/08/03	unknown	MPC; JPL
P/2005 L1	McNaught 5	7.92	0.20924	3.9745	3.1428	7.7369	10.2		2005/12/13	2013/11/14	MPC; JPL
P/2013 R3	Catalina–PanSTARRS 1	5.28	0.27345	3.03293	2.20358	0.89893	6.4	0.4 km	2013/08/05	2018/11/15	MPC; JPL
P/2013 R3-A	Catalina–PanSTARRS 1	5.28	0.2733	3.0327	2.2038	0.898		0.2 km	2013/08/05	2018/11/15	MPC; JPL
P/2013 R3-B	Catalina–PanSTARRS 1	5.28	0.2733	3.0327	2.2038	0.8996			2013/08/05	2018/11/15	MPC; JPL
P/2015 X6	PanSTARRS 52	4.57	0.1700	2.756	2.2873	4.5583	16.1	0.3 km	2016/03/18	2020/07/08	MPC; JPL
P/2016 G1	PanSTARRS 55	4.15	0.21003	2.58322	2.04068	10.9685	14.7		2017/01/26	2021/03/21	MPC; JPL
P/2017 FL_{36}	PanSTARRS	5.01	0.0320	2.929	2.835	15.70	14.7		2015/07/03		MPC; JPL
P/2017 S8	PanSTARRS 70	4.63	0.393696	2.77621	1.68322	29.85994	14.8		2018/01/28	2022/09/13	MPC; JPL
P/2019 A3	PanSTARRS 88	5.58	0.2648	3.1471	2.3134	15.366	14.9	0.4 km	2018/08/01	2024	MPC; JPL
P/2019 A4	PanSTARRS 89	4.23	0.0896	2.6135	2.3794	13.3190	15.4	0.35–0.5 km	2018/12/05	2023	MPC; JPL
P/2020 P4-B	SOHO	uncertain	0.9092	1.020	0.0926	28.1473	16.2		2020/08/08		MPC; JPL
P/2020 P4-C	SOHO	uncertain	0.9394	1.391	0.0842	37.5593	15.6		2020/08/06		MPC; JPL
P/2021 A5	PanSTARRS 117	5.32	0.1398	3.047	2.6209	18.188	15.0	1.2 km	2020/11/11	2026	MPC; JPL
P/2021 R8	Sheppard	5.24	0.2940	3.019	2.131	2.203	18.6		2021/10/07	2027	MPC; JPL
P/2022 R5	PANSTARRS 134	5.38	0.196	3.071	2.470	15.292	15.8		2022/05/27	2027	MPC; JPL
P/2023 JN16	Lemmon 18	4.43	0.147	2.695	2.299	3.703	15.44	0.5 km	2024/12/30	2029	MPC; JPL
P/2024 R2	PanSTARRS 167	5.55	0.266	3.137	2.302	15.109	15.6		2024/10/01	2030	MPC; JPL
P/2024 R3	PanSTARRS 168	5.72	0.266	3.197	2.345	14.732	17.3		2024/05/07	2031	MPC; JPL
P/2025 W3	Kresken	4.06	0.12753	2.544	2.219	10.707	16.9		2025/01/09	2029	MPC; JPL
P/2025 W4	PanSTARRS	4.14	0.21111	2.579	2.034	1.298	17.3		2025/10/04	2029	MPC; JPL
P/2026 C2	PanSTARRS	6.69	0.31426	3.552	2.436	7.40	14.7		2026/07/21	2032	MPC; JPL
P/2026 N2		5.39	0.21228	3.072	2.420	2.249	17.1		2026/09/26	2032	MPC; JPL
P/2026 U1	Gafton	5.42	0.45685	3.087	1.677	5.518	10.4		2027/08/23	2033	MPC; JPL

== List of unnumbered Jupiter-family comets ==
While Jupiter-family comets are officially defined by 2 < T_{Jupiter} < 3, they can also be loosely defined as any comet with a period of less than 20 years, a relatively low inclination, and an orbit coinciding loosely with that of Jupiter. These comets are often patchily observed, as orbital interactions with the planet often cause comets' orbits to become perturbed, causing them to not be found at the expected position in the sky and subsequently lost. Additionally, their low cometary albedos and frequent proximity to the Sun compared to Oort Cloud comets cause them to much more quickly become depleted of volatiles, making them comparatively dimmer than comets with longer orbital periods.

=== Before 2000 ===
Comet designation	Name/ discoverer(s)	Period (years)	e	a (AU)	q (AU)	i (°)	Abs. mag. (M1)	Nucleus radii	Last observed perihelion	Next perihelion	Ref
D/1766 G1	Helfenzrieder	4.35	0.84763	2.665	0.406	7.865		3.0–8.7 km	1766/04/26	unknown	MPC; JPL
D/1895 Q1	Swift	7.2	0.65210	3.729	1.298	2.992			1895/08/21	unknown	MPC; JPL
D/1978 R1	Haneda–Campos	5.97	0.66	3.29	1.10	5.95	12.9	0.5 km	1978/10/09	1985, 1991	MPC; JPL
X/1979 O3		5.44	0.33	3.09	2.07	1.75	15.8		1979/07/26	1985	
P/1996 R2	Lagerkvist	7.36	0.30998	3.782	2.60964	2.6054	6.3		2024/03/10	2031/10/06	MPC; JPL
P/1998 SH2: (875163); P/2016 EC_{156}	Spacewatch	4.54	0.71386	2.743	0.785	2.426	20.9	0.192 km	2025/07/21	2030	MPC; JPL
P/1998 VS_{24}	LINEAR 2	9.56	0.24393	4.5041	3.4054	5.031	11.3	5.4 km	2017/04/25	2024/11/06	MPC; JPL
P/1999 J6: C/2004 V9; C/2010 H3	SOHO 5	5.46	0.98418	3.1005	0.04906	26.61		0.024 km	2010/04/19	2026/06/18	MPC; JPL
P/1999 RO_{28}: P/2025 N3	LONEOS	6.62	0.65079	3.5272	1.23176	8.191	19.4		2024/06/09	2030/12/21	MPC; JPL
P/1999 XN_{120}	Catalina 2	8.55	0.21391	4.1806	3.2863	5.0283	9.9	9.1 km	2000/05/01	2008/11/17	MPC; JPL

=== 2000s ===
Comet designation	Name/ discoverer(s)	Period (years)	e	a (AU)	q (AU)	i (°)	Abs. mag. (M1)	Nucleus radii	Last observed perihelion	Next perihelion	Ref
P/2000 R2	LINEAR 15	6.1	0.5837	3.338	1.38997	3.2163	17.6		2000/09/12	2006/10/18	MPC; JPL
P/2001 H5	NEAT 2	14.68	0.6002	5.995	2.3966	8.3993	6.8	1.1 km	2001/01/28	2015/10/03	MPC; JPL
P/2002 EJ_{57}	LINEAR 24	16.53	0.59391	6.49	2.6355	4.9697	15.8	2.12 km	2001/12/19	2018/06/30	MPC; JPL
C/2002 R5	SOHO	5.77	0.98526	3.21612	0.0474	14.12			2002/09/05	2008/02/02	MPC; JPL
P/2002 S7	SOHO 4	5.79	0.98496	3.22344	0.04849	13.6			2002/09/21	2008/07/06	MPC; JPL
P/2003 F2	NEAT 14	16.58	0.54219	6.503	2.9772	11.605	13.7		2003/04/14	2019/11/12	MPC; JPL
P/2003 T_{12}: C/2012 A3	SOHO 7	4.12	0.775433	2.570078	0.57716	11.4579	19.7	0.26 km	2016/03/09	2020/05/06	MPC; JPL
P/2004 FY_{140}	LINEAR 48	11.02	0.1709	4.9523	4.1061	2.1279	12.5	10 km	2004/08/06	2015/08/13	MPC; JPL
P/2004 R3	LINEAR–NEAT	7.52	0.44184	3.8367	2.14148	7.9723	13.5		2004/05/24	2011/11/30	MPC; JPL
P/2005 E1	Tubbiolo	19.42	0.3847	7.225	4.4456	5.154	10.7		2005/03/18	2024/08/15	MPC; JPL
P/2007 K2	Gibbs 4	19.23	0.684	7.18	2.2686	7.6197	14		2007/06/08	2026/09/01	MPC; JPL
P/2007 Q2	Gilmore	13.23	0.67123	5.594	1.83902	10.2384	16.7		2007/08/23	2020/11/15	MPC; JPL
P/2007 S1	Zhao	7.4	0.34339	3.7989	2.4944	5.973	13.5		2007/12/06	2015/05/01	MPC; JPL
P/2007 T2	Kowalski 3	5.43	0.77483	3.0904	0.695863	9.89528	18.6		2007/09/19	2013/02/23	MPC; JPL
P/2008 Y_{12}: P/2014 K3	SOHO	5.4	0.9787	3.07822	0.0654	23.35			2008/12/22	2014/05/17	MPC; JPL
P/2009 B1	Boattini 4	17.3	0.63719	6.688	2.42659	22.2285	13.2		2009/02/06	2026/05/27	MPC; JPL
P/2009 WX_{51}	Catalina 10	5.41	0.740297	3.0803	0.799956	9.5926	20.6	0.215 km	2010/01/31	2015/06/30	MPC; JPL
P/2009 Y2	Kowalski 4	16.6	0.64052	6.507	2.33919	29.9296	6.1	1.56 km	2010/03/30	2026/11/04	MPC; JPL

=== 2010s ===
Comet designation	Name/ discoverer(s)	Period (years)	e	a (AU)	q (AU)	i (°)	Abs. mag. (M1)	Nucleus radii	Last observed perihelion	Next perihelion	Ref
P/2010 C1	Scotti 4	18.78	0.25911	7.0657	5.2349	9.14247	5.7	4.8 km	2009/12/01	2028/09/12	MPC; JPL
P/2010 D2	WISE	17.3	0.45301	6.6894	3.65902	57.17704	11.1	2.325 km	2010/03/05	2027/06/23	MPC; JPL
P/2010 H2	Vales	7.56	0.192894	3.85038	3.10767	14.2529	6.9	0.25 km	2010/03/09	2017/09/29	MPC; JPL
P/2010 H4	Scotti 7	17.05	0.272	6.624	4.821	2.314	10.8		2010/07/03	2027/07/21	MPC; JPL
P/2010 H5	Scotti 6	19.09	0.15646	7.1436	6.0259	14.0871	9.6		2010/04/17	2029/05/20	MPC; JPL
P/2010 T2	PanSTARRS 1	13.06	0.3231	5.546	3.754	8.0109	6.4		2011/07/09	2024/07/31	MPC; JPL
P/2010 UH_{55}	Spacewatch 5	16.63	0.57514	6.515	2.767969	8.66257	6.6		2011/05/10	2027/12/26	MPC; JPL
P/2011 C2	Gibbs 12	19.99	0.26846	7.366	5.38854	10.91098	6.2		2012/01/07	2032/01/03	MPC; JPL
P/2011 FR_{143}	Lemmon 4	17.85	0.45305	6.8296	3.73541	16.01358	11.1		2011/03/10	2029/01/14	MPC; JPL
P/2011 N1	ASH	15.79	0.545926	6.2935	2.857712	35.66877	10.3		2012/05/31	2028/03/15	MPC; JPL
P/2011 V1	Boattini 7	7.53	0.555	3.843	1.7094	7.397	13.7		2011/05/11	2018/11/15	MPC; JPL
P/2011 W1	PanSTARRS 5	10.05	0.28866	4.65606	3.31206	3.71861	6.2		2012/01/22	2022/02/09	MPC; JPL
P/2011 Y2	Boattini 8	15.53	0.71291	6.2251	1.787145	6.35139	13.6		2012/03/21	2027/09/03	MPC; JPL
P/2012 B1	PanSTARRS 6	16.53	0.4104966	6.4887702	3.8251522	7.62779	5.6	36.875 km	2013/07/23	2030/02/01	MPC; JPL
P/2012 F2	PanSTARRS 8	15.92	0.54224	6.3287	2.89707	14.72465	12		2013/04/10	2029/03/12	MPC; JPL
P/2012 G1	PanSTARRS 9	8.60	0.3852	4.1967	2.580	11.6965	15.2		2012/06/06	2021/01/08	MPC; JPL
P/2012 K3: P/2019 S6; P/2026 L3	Gibbs 15	6.88	0.42596	3.618	2.07686	13.2012	6.9		2012/09/30	2019/08/17	MPC; JPL
P/2012 O1	McNaught 24	6.73	0.57925	3.563	1.499145	11.4286	16.6		2012/07/23	2019/04/15	MPC; JPL
P/2012 O2	McNaught 25	6.82	0.53827	3.597	1.660834	24.5274	17.3		2012/06/25	2019/04/20	MPC; JPL
P/2012 S2	La Sagra	9.33	0.69059	4.4316	1.371192	8.58181	15.3		2021/12/16	2031/02/11	MPC; JPL
P/2012 T3	PanSTARRS 13	14.66	0.602	5.990	2.39	9.51	14.8		2012/04/15	2026/12/24	MPC; JPL
P/2012 U2	PanSTARRS 14	19.94	0.50657	7.3522	3.6278	10.5345	12.1		2012/12/04	2032/11/12	MPC; JPL
P/2013 AL_{76}	Catalina 11	16.6	0.685	6.51	2.0476	144.861	16		2012/12/13	2029/06/08	MPC; JPL
P/2013 G1	Kowalski 8	18.03	0.51237	6.8765	3.353099	5.46867	10.3		2013/12/10	2031/12/21	MPC; JPL
P/2013 G4	PanSTARRS 16	9.33	0.4104	4.432	2.6132	5.926	15.1		2013/02/09	2022/06/09	MPC; JPL
P/2013 J2	McNaught 28	15.61	0.656146	6.24634	2.147828	15.49553	10.8		2013/08/22	2029/04/02	MPC; JPL
P/2013 N5	PanSTARRS 21	17.74	0.7319	6.801	1.82305	23.2425	14.7		2013/07/02	2031/03/29	MPC; JPL
P/2013 T1	PanSTARRS 25	14.21	0.6233	5.867	2.2105	24.21	16.6		2013/07/31	2027/10/16	MPC; JPL
P/2013 T2	Schwartz	6.25	0.52849	3.3926	1.59962	9.3521	14.4		2013/06/20	2020/09/19	MPC; JPL
P/2013 W1	PanSTARRS 26	6.51	0.59388	3.4857	1.415614	4.69951	16.5	0.495 km	2014/03/08	2020/09/11	MPC; JPL
P/2013 YG_{46}	Spacewatch 7	6.02	0.4516	3.3103	1.815	8.217	10.6		2017/01/19	2023/01/26	MPC; JPL
P/2014 A2	Hill	14.42	0.64983	5.9248	2.07468	24.5135	13.4		2013/10/28	2027/03/30	MPC; JPL
P/2014 C1	TOTAS	5.31	0.446	3.043	1.6857	2.6796	15.6		2013/12/18	2019/04/10	MPC; JPL
P/2014 L2	NEOWISE	15.91	0.646763	6.32589	2.234541	5.18441	8.6	7.33 km	2014/07/15	2030/06/15	MPC; JPL
P/2014 M4	PanSTARRS 30	14.02	0.59557	5.8139	2.3513	3.34519	13.1		2014/12/27	2029/01/02	MPC; JPL
P/2014 U4	PanSTARRS 31	6.51	0.4711	3.4853	1.8434	6.4571	15.4		2014/08/03	2020/02/05	MPC; JPL
P/2014 V1	PanSTARRS 32	12.59	0.526	5.414	2.563	22.461	13.3		2015/01/21	2027	MPC; JPL
P/2014 X1	Elenin	15.66	0.71003	6.259	1.814	25.971	15.5	1.41 km	2015/01/07	2030	MPC; JPL
P/2015 C1	TOTAS–Gibbs	17.00	0.56256	6.6126	2.89264	13.8774	12.8		2015/05/01	2032/05/01	MPC; JPL
C/2015 D1	SOHO	11	0.9943	4.9	0.02832	69.62	14.7	0.05–0.15 km	2015/02/19	–	MPC; JPL
P/2015 D6	Lemmon-PANSTARRS 4	19.48	0.3696	7.239	4.5637	20.1839	11.0		2015/07/13	2035/01/03	MPC; JPL
P/2015 K5	PanSTARRS 43	17.32	0.5540	6.694	2.9861	39.987	13.7		2015/06/06	2032/09/30	MPC; JPL
P/2015 P4	PanSTARRS 44	14.97	0.58424	6.0736	2.52516	8.71375	6.5		2016/01/19	2031/01/08	MPC; JPL
P/2015 PD229	Cameron–ISON	19.23	0.32673	7.1768	4.83188	2.02687	11.0	21 km	2015/08/14	2034/11/06	MPC; JPL
C/2015 R1	PanSTARRS 46	14.32	0.63286	5.8982	2.16545	22.6683	13.4		2015/06/25	2030/01/04	MPC; JPL
P/2015 R2	PanSTARRS 47	9.1	0.440	4.36	2.44	14.8	15.8		2015/06/19	2021/07/29	MPC; JPL
P/2015 TP_{200}	LINEAR 67	19.72	0.53621	7.2993	3.38531	8.77231	13.9		2016/10/28	2036/07/18	MPC; JPL
P/2015 W2	Catalina 16	19.80	0.63411	7.3200	2.67834	11.6113	13.7		2015/09/30	2035/07/19	MPC; JPL
P/2015 X3	PanSTARRS 49	11.26	0.4382	5.024	2.822	24.38	14.5		2015/08/07	2026/11/09	MPC; JPL
P/2016 A7	PanSTARRS 54	11.26	0.56662	5.0225	2.17665	16.6374	7.3		2016/02/25	2027/05/31	MPC; JPL
P/2016 P1	PanSTARRS 57	5.8	0.294	3.23	2.28	26	15.5		2015/09/07	2021/08/11	MPC; JPL
P/2016 P5	COIAS	10.20	0.0589	4.70	4.43	7.04	8.0		2023/05/29	2033	MPC; JPL
P/2016 R4	Gibbs 18	12.32	0.47506	5.3350	2.80052	10.8621	13.1		2016/07/20	2028/11/13	MPC; JPL
P/2017 D1	Fuls 1	10.52	0.44033	4.80244	2.688	20.7326	13.4		2016/06/28	2027/01/06	MPC; JPL
P/2017 K3	Gasparovic	13.16	0.58125	5.574272	2.3342	4.27872	14.6		2017/05/31	2030/07/29	MPC; JPL
P/2017 TW_{13}	Lemmon 11	19.17	0.7098	7.163	2.07878	44.837	15		2018/06/20	2037/08/22	MPC; JPL
P/2017 U3	PanSTARRS 72	10.97	0.0997	4.936	4.444	15.909	11.1		2019/04/22	2030/04/09	MPC; JPL
P/2018 A4	PanSTARRS 79	36.35	0.7818	10.974	2.395	3.1423	6.9		2018/05/19	2054	MPC; JPL
P/2018 A5	PanSTARRS 75	13.42	0.5230	5.648	2.694	23.577	13.9		2017/09/23	2031	MPC; JPL
P/2018 C1	Lemmon-Read	13.17	0.5345	5.577	2.596	5.1350	13.9		2018/02/24	2031	MPC; JPL
P/2018 H2	PanSTARRS 80	9.25	0.5398	4.405	2.027	7.389	15.4		2018/01/23	2027	MPC; JPL
P/2018 L4	PanSTARRS 82	10.94	0.6598	4.928	1.676	26.619	8.9		2018/07/31	2029	MPC; JPL
P/2018 P4	PanSTARRS 84	17.17	0.449	6.656	3.6664	23.108	12.1		2018/11/06	2036	MPC; JPL
C/2018 P5	PanSTARRS 85	45.42	0.6405	12.72968	4.576	7.2568	6.5		2019/02/26	2064	MPC; JPL
P/2018 V5	Trujillo–Sheppard	26.83	0.475	8.961	4.71	10.58	8.5		2018/10/03	2045	MPC; JPL
P/2018 VN_{2}: P/2010 W10; P/2026 M2	Leonard 4	8.19	0.479	4.0639	2.1172	18.147	16.4		2018/06/06	2026	MPC; JPL
P/2018 Y2	Africano	20.44	0.4791	7.4765	3.8946	11.687	11		2019/01/02	2039	MPC; JPL
P/2019 A1	PanSTARRS 87	11.62	0.5689	5.1307	2.2117	13.744	13.7		2018/10/11	2030	MPC; JPL
P/2019 A2	ATLAS 5	13.73	0.3820	5.7331	3.543	14.856	10.8		2018/11/21	2032	MPC; JPL
P/2019 A6	Lemmon–PanSTARRS 7	12.45	0.6392	5.3725	1.9385	33.2283	14.5		2018/08/29	2031	MPC; JPL
P/2019 B2	Gröller 1	7.56	0.3729	3.8534	2.4165	16.8287	6.6		2019/06/08	2026	MPC; JPL
P/2019 F2	ATLAS 6	67.33	0.8651	16.5508	2.2328	19.1874	6.2		2019/09/08	2086	MPC; JPL
P/2019 GG_{21}	PanSTARRS 94	20.36	0.4720	7.4553	3.9365	6.0898	15.0		2019/05/08	2039	MPC; JPL
P/2019 LD2	ATLAS 10	12.17	0.1346	5.2898	4.5780	11.5587	12.2	1.2 km	2020/04/07	2032	MPC; JPL
P/2019 LM_{4}	Palomar	13.67	0.5852	5.718	2.3716	36.3948	13.4		2019/06/18	2033	MPC; JPL
P/2019 S2	PanSTARRS 96	10.30	0.2067	4.733	3.7553	10.4730	13.1		2019/02/20	2029	MPC; JPL
P/2019 S3	PanSTARRS 97	6.31	0.4706	3.413	1.8067	8.692	17.9		2019/08/26	2025	MPC; JPL
P/2019 T6	PanSTARRS 98	12.74	0.6235	5.454	2.0534	18.7574	15.7		2019/11/08	2032	MPC; JPL
P/2019 U4	PanSTARRS 99	6.60	0.4752	3.520	1.8471	11.6923	18.6		2019/09/18	2026	MPC; JPL
P/2019 W1	PanSTARRS 100	9.71	0.2660	4.550	3.3399	23.4619	13.2		2019/05/07	2029	MPC; JPL
P/2019 X1	Pruyne	15.34	0.3026	6.174	4.3055	10.2465	10.3		2019/07/20	2034	MPC; JPL
P/2019 X2	PanSTARRS 101	6.95	0.4993	3.643	1.8241	15.8816	18.1		2019/12/09	2026	MPC; JPL

=== 2020s ===
Comet designation	Name/ discoverer(s)	Period (years)	e	a (AU)	q (AU)	i (°)	Abs. mag. (M1)	Nucleus radii	Last observed perihelion	Next perihelion	Ref
P/2020 G1	Pimentel	6.84	0.8596	3.603	0.5058	18.4727	18.7		2020/03/17	2027	MPC; JPL
P/2020 K9	Lemmon–PanSTARRS 8	8.62	0.3221	4.204	2.8495	23.2026	12.3		2021/02/12	2029	MPC; JPL
P/2020 M1	PanSTARRS 104	11.47	0.4770	5.087	2.6609	8.6328	10.1		2019/12/21	2031	MPC; JPL
P/2020 O3	PanSTARRS 105	10.07	0.1061	4.662	4.1674	8.4428	12.3		2021/01/26	2031	MPC; JPL
P/2020 Q2	PanSTARRS 106	36.10	0.5055	10.923	3.3100	5.4018	10.9		2020/02/07	2056	MPC; JPL
P/2020 R5	PanSTARRS 108	11.11	0.3145	4.9788	3.4130	11.4543	7.5		2020/05/28	2031	MPC; JPL
P/2020 S1	PanSTARRS 109	14.63	0.5072	5.9811	2.9473	13.7349	17.5		2021/01/16	2038	MPC; JPL
P/2020 S5	PanSTARRS 111	8.15	0.3383	4.0482	2.6787	12.3542	14.7		2020/08/08	2028	MPC; JPL
P/2020 S7	PanSTARRS 114	11.26	0.4106	5.0238	2.9610	16.0922	14.6		2020/11/18	2032	MPC; JPL
P/2020 T3	PanSTARRS 112	6.60	0.5915	3.5168	1.4366	7.296	13.2	0.2 km	2021/01/20	2027	MPC; JPL
P/2020 U2	PanSTARRS 115	7.34	0.5105	3.777	1.849	6.421	9.2	2.445 km	2020/12/25	2028	MPC; JPL
P/2020 W1	Rankin 1	19.29	0.2649	7.193	5.288	10.792	10.4		2020/04/04	2039	MPC; JPL
P/2020 X1	ATLAS 12	9.61	0.3641	4.5186	2.873	31.6672	12.5		2020/07/21	2030	MPC; JPL
P/2020 X2	ATLAS 13	66.29	0.7663	16.3789	3.829	18.1917	10.5		2020/11/15	2087	MPC; JPL
P/2021 HS	PanSTARRS	8.59	0.79645	4.196	0.796	12.171	20.6	0.3–0.55 km	2021/08/06	2030	MPC; JPL
P/2021 L2	Leonard 7	8.16	0.5218	4.053	1.939	21.069	15.8		2021/07/24	2029	MPC; JPL
P/2021 N1: P/2026 M1	ZTF 1	5.84	0.6768	2.977	0.962	11.506	17.8		2021/06/06	2026	MPC; JPL
P/2021 N2	Fuls 2	18.26	0.4524	6.933	3.797	13.063	8.6	14.135 km	2021/11/13	2039	MPC; JPL
P/2021 P3	PanSTARRS 120	9.298	0.3405	4.4216	2.916	27.156	4.9		2021/05/31	2030	MPC; JPL
P/2021 PE_{20}	ATLAS 19	7.251	0.671	3.746	1.233	20.018	16.54	0.685 km	2021/06/07	2028	MPC; JPL
P/2021 Q5	ATLAS 16	5.955	0.6242	3.285	1.235	10.734	15.8		2021/08/30	2027	MPC; JPL
P/2021 R3	PanSTARRS 122	7.35	0.3319	3.7804	2.526	19.933	18.2		2021/05/27	2028	MPC; JPL
P/2021 R4	Wierzchos 1	13.32	0.5862	5.6204	2.326	21.040	16.3		2021/10/13	2034	MPC; JPL
P/2021 R5	Rankin 3	10.51	0.3076	4.7987	3.323	7.852	7.3		2022/01/11	2032	MPC; JPL
P/2021 R6	Gröller 3	15.716	0.5932	6.274	2.552	34.926	14.9		2021/10/31	2037	MPC; JPL
P/2021 U3	Attard–Maury	8.587	0.5500	4.193	1.887	69.966	16.8		2021/10/24	2030	MPC; JPL
P/2022 B1	Wierzchos 3	12.77	0.6528	5.463	1.897	10.991	9.8		2022/02/25	2034	MPC; JPL
P/2022 BV_{9}	Lemmon 16	9.10	0.2350	4.358	3.334	11.935	13.67		2020/08/23	2029	MPC; JPL
P/2022 C1	PanSTARRS 127	19.38	0.4476	7.215	3.986	4.762	12.4		2021/11/04	2041	MPC; JPL
P/2022 C2	PanSTARRS 128	14.88	0.4428	6.049	3.370	9.980	7.2		2022/08/06	2037	MPC; JPL
P/2022 C3	PanSTARRS 129	30.01	0.5470	9.656	4.374	12.816	7.1		2022/07/01	2052	MPC; JPL
P/2022 D1	PanSTARRS 130	20.14	0.5470	7.401	3.353	44.064	15.9		2021/08/28	2041	MPC; JPL
P/2022 L3	ATLAS 17	16.63	0.6285	6.514	2.420	21.540	13.6	4.655 km	2022/10/29	2039	MPC; JPL
P/2022 M1	LONEOS–PanSTARRS	10.81	0.5784	4.890	2.061	7.027	15.9		2022/08/02	2033	MPC; JPL
P/2022 O2	PanSTARRS 131	15.86	0.7217	6.313	1.757	9.426	13.5		2023/01/07	2038	MPC; JPL
P/2022 P2	ZTF 2	9.50	0.5581	4.486	1.982	12.443	5.9		2022/07/10	2032	MPC; JPL
P/2022 R1	PanSTARRS 132	19.19	0.5023	7.167	3.567	7.408	7.4		2023/10/13	2043	MPC; JPL
P/2022 R4	PanSTARRS 133	7.51	0.4904	3.837	1.956	21.022	18.5		2022/07/10	2030	MPC; JPL
P/2022 S1	PanSTARRS 135	16.23	0.508	6.410	3.151	34.582	13.2		2022/08/19	2038	MPC; JPL
P/2022 W1	Rankin 4	18.39	0.517	6.968	3.368	13.467	15.4		2022/09/15	2041	MPC; JPL
P/2023 B1	PanSTARRS 139	18.72	0.129	7.049	6.141	14.589	5.9		2023/04/26	2042	MPC; JPL
P/2023 B3	PanSTARRS 141	9.68	0.123	4.543	3.983	9.163	14.7		2020/09/02	2032	MPC; JPL
P/2023 M1	PanSTARRS 144	17.96	0.588	6.857	2.826	12.290	7.5		2023/12/14	2041	MPC; JPL
P/2023 M2	PanSTARRS 145	13.12	0.369	5.562	3.508	19.725	11.9		2023/07/25	2036	MPC; JPL
P/2023 M4	ATLAS 21	12.75	0.279	5.453	3.929	7.592	11.0		2022/04/15	2035	MPC; JPL
P/2023 S1	PanSTARRS	7.57	0.321	3.856	2.618	9.149	7.1		2025/02/22	2032	MPC; JPL
P/2023 T1	PanSTARRS 149	8.72	0.335	4.238	2.817	6.606	6.1		2024/05/22	2033	MPC; JPL
P/2023 V2	PanSTARRS 150	19.59	0.573	7.267	3.104	9.878	7.6		2024/02/04	2043	MPC; JPL
P/2023 V6	PanSTARRS 152	12.38	0.181	5.5351	4.384	3.977	11.6	0.31 km	2022/12/21	2035	MPC; JPL
P/2023 X3	PanSTARRS 153	8.76	0.287	4.251	3.030	4.483	14.6		2024/04/21	2033	MPC; JPL
P/2023 Y1	Gibbs 21	7.26	0.445	3.728	2.080	6.384	16.2		2023/11/29	2031	MPC; JPL
P/2023 Y2	Gibbs 22	7.25	0.392	3.744	2.276	6.992	11.9		2023/08/09	2030	MPC; JPL
P/2024 F1	PanSTARRS 158	6.39	0.460	3.442	1.860	7.006	16.5		2023/10/25	2030	MPC; JPL
P/2024 FG_{9}	Nanshan–Hahn	5.88	0.510	3.259	1.596	1.730	10.4		2024/05/20	2030	MPC; JPL
P/2024 J1	PanSTARRS 160	7.43	0.307	3.808	2.637	13.161	14.5		2023/11/10	2031	MPC; JPL
P/2024 K1	PanSTARRS 162	17.91	0.495	6.847	3.456	1.786	13.4		2024/05/09	2041	MPC; JPL
P/2024 O2	PanSTARRS 164	20.1	0.500	7.391	3.696	28.97	12.5		2024/04/19	2044	MPC; JPL
P/2024 OC_{2}	PanSTARRS	4.256	0.77423	2.626	0.593	7.671	20.7		2024/10/09	2029	MPC; JPL
P/2024 Q1	PanSTARRS 165	6.60	0.535	3.517	1.636	5.016	18.7		2024/06/14	2031	MPC; JPL
P/2024 R1	PanSTARRS 166	6.41	0.493	3.451	1.750	12.736	19.2		2024/06/15	2031	MPC; JPL
P/2024 S2	Rankin 7	11.25	0.592	5.021	2.048	7.524	14.7		2024/09/16	2036	MPC; JPL
P/2024 T1	Rankin 6	16.95	0.654	6.599	2.287	17.619	14.1		2024/09/30	2041	MPC; JPL
P/2024 T2	Rankin 8	15.3	0.681	6.176	1.972	12.93	16.2		2024/12/08	2040	MPC; JPL
C/2024 X1	Fazekas	29.6	0.601	9.568	3.815	6.46	7.3		2025/08/03	2055	MPC; JPL
P/2024 X3	PanSTARRS	18.5	0.626	6.995	2.614	2.97	16.4		2024/09/05	2043	MPC; JPL
C/2024 X4	PanSTARRS	31.9	0.642	10.06	3.605	34.67	7.6		2025/09/01	2057	MPC; JPL
P/2025 A2	PanSTARRS	11.5	0.322	5.086	3.446	20.73	16.1		2024/10/05	2036	MPC; JPL
C/2025 A3	Tsuchinshan	32.5	0.432	10.19	5.793	9.98	13.5		2026/03/15	2057	MPC; JPL
C/2025 A4	PanSTARRS	36.7	0.654	11.05	3.824	32.03	12.1		2025/01/13	2061	MPC; JPL
P/2025 C1	ATLAS	8.59	0.345	4.195	2.746	7.52	11.2		2025/02/06	2033	MPC; JPL
P/2025 D3	PanSTARRS	7.9	0.252	3.966	2.966	9.64	17.5		2024/07/25	2032	MPC; JPL
P/2025 D4	ATLAS	26.5	0.634	8.899	3.255	15.94	5.3		2025/02/14	2051	MPC; JPL
P/2025 U1	Hogan	15.94	0.33232	6.333	4.229	23.929	11.4		2026/01/23	2041	MPC; JPL
P/2025 UX_{109}	Ye	7.54	0.33085	3.846	2.573	3.179	13.5		2025/08/15	2033	MPC; JPL
P/2025 Y2	PanSTARRS	8.003	0.23874	4.001	3.046	16.592	13.1		2025/12/08	2033	MPC; JPL
P/2026 P1	PanSTARRS	21.77	0.53653	7.797	3.614	8.479	11.7		2026/11/28	2048	MPC; JPL
P/2026 R1	PanSTARRS	5.609	0.43038	3.157	1.798	27.249	17.0		2026/06/27	2032	MPC; JPL
P/2026 R3	PanSTARRS	21.78	0.89877	7.799	0.789	78.101	18.9		2026/10/25	2048	MPC; JPL
P/2026 T1	ATLAS	12.51	0.34439	5.389	3.533	16.79	6.3		2026/08/20	2039	MPC; JPL
P/2026 V1	Lemmon	18.49	0.44764	6.993	3.863	13.30	10.6		2027/03/27	2045	MPC; JPL

== List of unnumbered Chiron-type comets ==
Comet designation	Name/ discoverer(s)	Period (years)	e	a (AU)	q (AU)	i (°)	Abs. mag. (M1)	Nucleus radii	Last observed perihelion	Next perihelion	Ref
P/2005 S2: P/2025 OZ_{695}	Skiff	22.5	0.1967	7.965	6.398	3.14	7.9	2.0 km	2006/06/30	2029	MPC; JPL
P/2005 T3	Read	20.6	0.1738	7.507	6.202	6.26	9.2		2006/01/12	2026	MPC; JPL
C/2011 P2	PanSTARRS	30.5	0.3698	9.756	6.148	8.99	6.7	8.0 km	2010/09/13	2041	MPC; JPL
P/2011 S1	Gibbs	25.4	0.2032	8.652	6.894	2.68	7.1	4.0 km	2014/08/24	2040	MPC; JPL
C/2013 C2	Tenagra	64.3	0.4313	16.06	9.131	21.34	6.6		2015/08/29	2079	MPC; JPL
C/2013 P4	PanSTARRS	56.8	0.5961	14.77	5.967	4.26	6.9		2014/08/12	2071	MPC; JPL
C/2014 OG392	PanSTARRS	42.5	0.1819	12.19	9.969	9.04	11.5	10.0 km	2021/12/01	2064	MPC; JPL
P/2015 M2	PanSTARRS 45	19.33	0.17896	7.2017	5.9128	3.9741	8.2		2015/08/31	2024/12/29	MPC; JPL
C/2015 T5	Sheppard–Tholen	148	0.6661	27.97	9.338	11.05	7.7		2016/01/24	2164	MPC; JPL
C/2016 Q4	Kowalski	68.9	0.5783	16.8	7.084	7.26	12.1		2018/01/28	2068	MPC; JPL
P/2020 B4	Sheppard	22.5	0.1925	7.974	6.439	11.60	7.6		2021/11/25	2044	MPC; JPL
P/2020 MK4	PanSTARRS 137	15.25	0.0205	6.150	6.023	6.691	7.6	1.1 km	2015/06/15	2030	MPC; JPL
C/2023 RS61	PanSTARRS	41.1	0.3277	11.9	8.001	19.94	8.8	4.7 km	2028/11/30	2069	MPC; JPL
C/2024 C2	PanSTARRS	65	0.4440	16.17	8.991	27.28	6.2		2025/03/10	2090	MPC; JPL
P/2025 D2	PanSTARRS	26.6	0.1780	8.917	7.329	5.33	8.1		2028/11/06	2054	MPC; JPL

== See also ==
- List of comets by type
  - List of numbered comets
  - List of Halley-type comets
  - List of long-period comets
  - List of near-parabolic comets
  - List of parabolic and hyperbolic comets
  - List of Kreutz sungrazers
  - List of comets with no meaningful orbit
