= Chiron-type comet =

Family of comets

A Chiron-type comet (CTC) is a member of a small family of comets defined as having a semi-major axis larger than that of Jupiter (5.2 AU) and a Tisserand's parameter with respect to Jupiter (T_{Jupiter}) of more than 3.

The family is named after its largest and most prominent member 2060 Chiron, officially designated as both a comet (95P/Chiron) and a minor planet of the centaur-class, which blurs the line between the two groups.

There are four numbered comets considered to be classical members of this family: 39P/Oterma, 165P/LINEAR, 166P/NEAT, and 167P/CINEOS.

CTCs are distinct from the Encke-type comets (ETC) and Jupiter-family comets (JFC). Contrary to the Chiron-type comets, JFCs have a T_{Jupiter} of less than 3 (typically with a period of less than 20 years), while the ETCs have a semi-major axis smaller than that of Jupiter. Another group, the Halley-type comets (HTC), only have a classical definition, that is a period between 20 and 200 years. Members of the CTC family have a dynamical lifetime of 6.5 million years, much longer than the 50,000 years attributed to the Jupiter-family comets.
