= 172P/Yeung =

Jupiter-family comet

Discovery
- Discovered by: Bill Yeung
- Discovery site: Apache Point Observatory
- Discovery date: 21 January 2002

Designations
- MPC designation: P/2001 CB_{40} P/2002 BV
- Alternative designations: PK02B00V

Orbital characteristics
- Epoch: 21 November 2025 (JD 2461000.5)
- Observation arc: 31.62 years
- Earliest precovery date: 20 October 1993
- Number of observations: 797
- Aphelion: 5.091 AU
- Perihelion: 3.358 AU
- Semi-major axis: 4.225 AU
- Eccentricity: 0.20507
- Orbital period: 8.683 years
- Inclination: 11.222°
- Longitude of ascending node: 30.881°
- Argument of periapsis: 208.87°
- Mean anomaly: 2.114°
- Last perihelion: 2 November 2025
- Next perihelion: 19 July 2034
- T_{Jupiter}: 2.958
- Earth MOID: 2.232 AU
- Jupiter MOID: 0.082 AU

Physical characteristics
- Mean radius: 5.6 km (3.5 mi)
- Comet total magnitude (M1): 14.8

172P/Yeung is a Jupiter-family comet with a 6.59-year orbit around the Sun. It is the first of two comets discovered by Hong Kong/Canadian astronomer, William Kwong Yu Yeung. (Note: Bill Yeung later co-discovered C/2015 VL_{62} (Lemmon–Yeung–PanSTARRS) in 2015)

== Observational history ==
It was initially thought as an apparently asteroid-like object from CCD images taken by Bill Yeung from the Apache Point Observatory on the night of 21 January 2002. Additional reports from the Minor Planet Center later identified that this comet is the same object as 2001 CB_{40}, with precovery images dating as early as 20 October 1993. This relatively long observation arc for a newly discovered comet allowed it to receive a permanent numerical designation from the MPC as 172P.

== Physical characteristics ==
Infrared observations by the Spitzer Space Telescope between 2006 and 2007 revealed that the nucleus of 172P/Yeung is about 5.6 km (3.5 mi) in radius.

== Notes ==
Numbered comets
Previous; 171P/Spahr	172P/Yeung	Next; 173P/Mueller
