= Alpha Capricornids =

Meteor shower in July and August

- Celestial map of Capricornus
- Discovery date: 1871
- Parent body: 169P/NEAT (2002 EX12)

Radiant
- Constellation: Capricornus
- Right ascension: 20^{h} 44^{m} 00^{s}
- Declination: −10° 00′ 00″

Properties
- Occurs during: July 7 to August 15
- Date of peak: July 31
- Velocity: 23 km/s
- Zenithal hourly rate: 5

Alpha Capricornids is a meteor shower that takes place as early as 7 July and continues until around 15 August. The meteor shower was discovered by Hungarian astronomer Miklos von Konkoly-Thege in 1871. This shower has infrequent but relatively bright meteors, with some fireballs. Parent body is comet 169P/NEAT.

Peter Jenniskens and Jeremie Vaubaillon identified the parent body as asteroid 2002 EX12, which in the return of 2005 was found weakly active near perihelion. This object is now called comet 169P/NEAT.

According to Jenniskens and Vaubaillon, the meteor shower was created about 3,500 to 5,000 years ago, when about half of the parent body disintegrated and fell into dust. The dust cloud evolved into Earth's orbit recently, causing a shower with peak rates of 2-5/h, sometimes having outbursts of bright flaring meteors with rates up to 5-9/h.

The bulk of the dust will not be in Earth's path until the 24th century. The Alpha Capricornids are expected to become a major annual storm in 2220–2420 A.D., one that will be "stronger than any current annual shower."
