= 2212 Hephaistos =

Apollo asteroid

Hephaistos
Discovery
- Discovered by: Lyudmila Chernykh
- Discovery site: Crimean Astrophysical Observatory
- Discovery date: 27 September 1978

Designations
- Pronunciation: /hɛˈfeɪstɒs/
- Named after: Hephaestus
- Alternative designations: 1978 SB

Orbital characteristics
- Epoch 13 January 2016 (JD 2457400.5)
- Uncertainty parameter 0
- Observation arc: 41.13 yr (15022 days)
- Aphelion: 3.9674 AU (593.51 Gm)
- Perihelion: 0.35068 AU (52.461 Gm)
- Semi-major axis: 2.1590 AU (322.98 Gm)
- Eccentricity: 0.83757
- Orbital period (sidereal): 3.17 yr (1158.8 d)
- Mean anomaly: 272.08°
- Mean motion: 0° 18^{m} 38.412^{s} / day
- Inclination: 11.558°
- Longitude of ascending node: 27.569°
- Time of perihelion: 2023-Feb-26; 2019-Dec-25 (previous)
- Argument of perihelion: 209.33°
- Earth MOID: 0.11610 AU (17.368 Gm)

Physical characteristics
- Dimensions: ~6 km
- Mean radius: 2.85 km
- Synodic rotation period: 20 h (0.83 d)
- Spectral type: SG
- Absolute magnitude (H): 13.87

2212 Hephaistos (1978 SB) is an Apollo asteroid and a NEO discovered on 27 September 1978 by L. I. Chernykh at the Crimean Astrophysical Observatory. It is named after the Greek god Hephaestus. It is the largest member of the Hephaistos asteroid group. It makes close approaches to all of the inner planets and will pass 0.048 AU (7.2 million km) from Mercury on September 16, 2032.

Other potential members of the Hephaistos group include (85182) 1991 AQ, 4486 Mithra, and D/1766 G1 (Helfenzrieder).
