= 167P/CINEOS =

Chiron-type comet

Discovery
- Discovered by: CINEOS
- Discovery date: August 10, 2004

Designations
- MPC designation: P/2004 PY_{42}

Orbital characteristics
- Epoch: November 21, 2025 (JD 2461000.5)
- Observation arc: 9.35 years (Note: Observation arc from the Minor Planet Center database covering dates from June 12, 2002 until October 19, 2011.)
- Earliest precovery date: June 12, 2002
- Number of observations: 99
- Aphelion: 20.598 AU
- Perihelion: 11.894 AU
- Semi-major axis: 16.246 AU
- Eccentricity: 0.26787
- Orbital period: 65.483 years
- Max. orbital speed: 9.8 km/s
- Min. orbital speed: 5.6 km/s (Note: Minimum orbital speed attained at its next aphelion on November 30, 2033.)
- Inclination: 19.073°
- Longitude of ascending node: 295.84°
- Argument of periapsis: 344.33°
- Mean anomaly: 135.64°
- Last perihelion: April 24, 2001
- Next perihelion: March 18, 2066; March 23, 2066
- T_{Jupiter}: 3.527
- Earth MOID: 10.771 AU
- Jupiter MOID: 6.604 AU

Physical characteristics
- Dimensions: 66.17 ± 22.9 km (41.12 ± 14.23 mi)
- Geometric albedo: 0.053±0.019
- Spectral type: (B–V) = 0.80±0.04; (V–R) = 0.57±0.03; (R–I) = 0.45±0.03; (B–R) = 1.29±0.03
- Comet nuclear magnitude (M2): 9.7

167P/CINEOS, also known as P/2004 PY_{42}, is a large periodic comet and active, grey centaur, approximately 66 kilometers (41 miles) in diameter, orbiting the Sun outside the orbit of Saturn. It was discovered on August 10, 2004, by astronomers with the CINEOS survey at Gran Sasso in Italy. It is one of only a handful known Chiron-type comets.

The comet nucleus (~66 km) is roughly half the size of C/2014 UN271 (Bernardinelli–Bernstein) and it has a similar perihelion point just outside the orbit of Saturn.

Large comets with perihelion near Saturn's orbit at 10 AU
| Comet | Nucleus diameter | Perihelion (Sun approach) | Perihelion velocity |
|---|---|---|---|
| 95P/Chiron | 215 km | 8.5 AU | 12.0 km/s |
| C/2014 UN271 (Bernardinelli–Bernstein) | 120 km | 10.95 AU | 12.7 km/s |
| 167P/CINEOS | 66 km | 11.77 AU | 9.8 km/s |

== Observational history ==
Due to its high Jupiter tisserand of 3.5, and a semi-major axis larger than that of Jupiter, 167P/CINEOS is classified as a Chiron-type comet, named after the groups namesake, 2060 Chiron or 95P/Chiron, designated as both minor planet and comet.

167P/CINEOS was first reported as a minor planet, designated 2004 PY_{42}, but was found to have a very faint asymmetric cometary coma. Contrary to Chiron, which is the prototype object for the dynamical group of centaurs, 167P/CINEOS has no "dual status" as comet and minor planet, and demonstrates the inconsistencies in applying the current rules for designating small Solar System bodies. 167P/CINEOS not only has orbital parameters similar to those of Chiron, but also a low B–R magnitude of 1.29±0.03, which places it into the group grey centaurs.

In June 2039, 167P/CINEOS will pass 1.64 AU from Uranus.

== Notes ==
Numbered comets
| Previous; 166P/NEAT | 167P/CINEOS | Next; 168P/Hergenrother |
