= P/2019 LD2 (ATLAS) =

Jupiter-family comet

P/2019 LD_{2} (ATLAS)
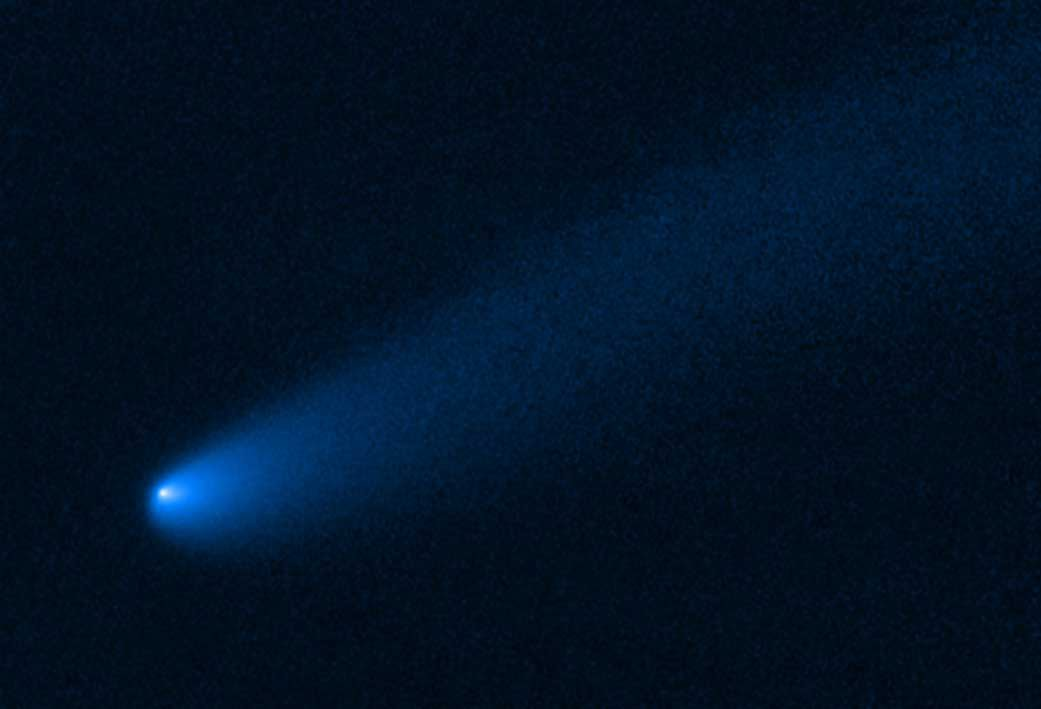
- P/2019 LD_{2} (ATLAS) imaged by the Hubble Space Telescope in April 2020

Discovery
- Discovered by: Alan Fitzsimmons; David Young
- Discovery site: ATLAS–MLO
- Discovery date: 10 June 2019

Orbital characteristics
- Epoch: 23 September 2020 (JD 2459115.5)
- Observation arc: 5.53 years
- Earliest precovery date: 9 May 2018
- Number of observations: 768
- Aphelion: 5.990 AU
- Perihelion: 4.578 AU
- Semi-major axis: 5.284 AU
- Eccentricity: 0.13359
- Orbital period: 12.146 years
- Inclination: 11.568°
- Longitude of ascending node: 179.67°
- Argument of periapsis: 123.43°
- Mean anomaly: 13.51°
- Last perihelion: 18 February 2020
- Next perihelion: 25 July 2028
- T_{Jupiter}: 2.942
- Earth MOID: 3.580 AU
- Jupiter MOID: 0.051 AU

Physical characteristics
- Mean diameter: <2.4 km (1.5 mi)
- Spectral type: (V–R) = 0.51±0.09
- Comet total magnitude (M1): 7.0
- Comet nuclear magnitude (M2): 12.2
- Apparent magnitude: 19.0

P/2019 LD_{2} (ATLAS) is a Jupiter-family comet and centaur discovered by the Asteroid Terrestrial-impact Last Alert System on 10 June 2019. It was initially reported as the first known Jupiter trojan asteroid to display cometary activity, but its classification as a Jupiter trojan was retracted after closer examination and a longer observation arc revealed its orbit to be unstable like a typical Jupiter family comet and implied that its position near the trojans is temporary.

== Discovery ==
P/2019 LD_{2} was discovered in images by the Asteroid Terrestrial-impact Last Alert System (ATLAS) at the Mauna Loa Observatory taken on 10 June 2019. Upon discovery, astronomers Alan Fitzsimmons and David Young at Queen's University Belfast suspected a faint coma around P/2019 LD_{2}. Follow-up observations by the Las Cumbres Observatory in 11 and 13 June 2019 confirmed the cometary appearance of P/2019 LD_{2}, which now had a more apparent coma and tail. Later observations by the ATLAS-MLO in April 2020 showed that P/2019 LD_{2} still retained its cometary appearance, suggesting it had been continuously active for almost a year.

The discovery of P/2019 LD_{2}'s cometary activity was announced in a press release by the University of Hawaiʻi Institute for Astronomy on 20 May 2020, proposing it as the first known active Jupiter trojan, as it was discovered near Jupiter's L_{4} Lagrangian point where the Greek camp trojans reside. However, upon closer examination of P/2019 LD_{2}'s orbital dynamics by amateur astronomer Sam Deen, P/2019 LD_{2} was found to be a Jupiter-family comet with a chaotic orbit instead of a Jupiter trojan. Subsequently, the comet was reclassified and given the periodic comet designation P/2019 LD_{2} (ATLAS) by the Minor Planet Center on 22 May 2020.

== Orbit and classification ==
Animation of P/2019 LD_{2} around Sun from 1600 to 2200 Sun · Jupiter · P/2019 LD_{2}

P/2019 LD_{2} orbits the Sun at a mean distance of 5.28 AU once every 12.15 years. Its orbit has an eccentricity of 0.134 and an inclination of 11.6 degrees with respect to the ecliptic. The body's observation arc begins with a precovery, published by the Pan-STARRS 1 survey and taken at Haleakala Observatory on 21 May 2018, or 11 months prior to its official discovery observation by the ATLAS-MLO survey.

P/2019 LD_{2} is a Jupiter-family comet with a Tisserand parameter of 2.92, typical for other Jupiter-family comets. The comet's nominal orbit suggests that it is not in a stable 1:1 resonance with Jupiter as it made a close approach to the planet on 17 February 2017, at a distance of 0.092 AU (13.8 million km; 8.6 million mi), and will make a similarly close approach in 2028. Unlike the Jupiter trojans, P/2019 LD_{2} is 21 degrees ahead of Jupiter, and will continue drifting 30 degrees ahead before returning to Jupiter and making close approaches. P/2019 LD_{2} is now following what looks like a short arc of a quasi-satellite cycle with respect to Jupiter that started in 2017 and will end in 2028. According to a 2021 study, it will have a very close encounter with Jupiter at an uncertain distance on 23 January 2063, possibly as close as 0.016 AU (2.4 million km). Since then, the details of that close approach have been refined somewhat; as of March 2026, JPL gives the minimum and maximum possible close approach distances as 0.052 au and 0.076 au, respectively, and the date as 13 January 2063 (with an uncertainty of ± 1 day), based on data up to 19 November 2023. Orbital predictions after this flyby are uncertain.

== Physical characteristics ==
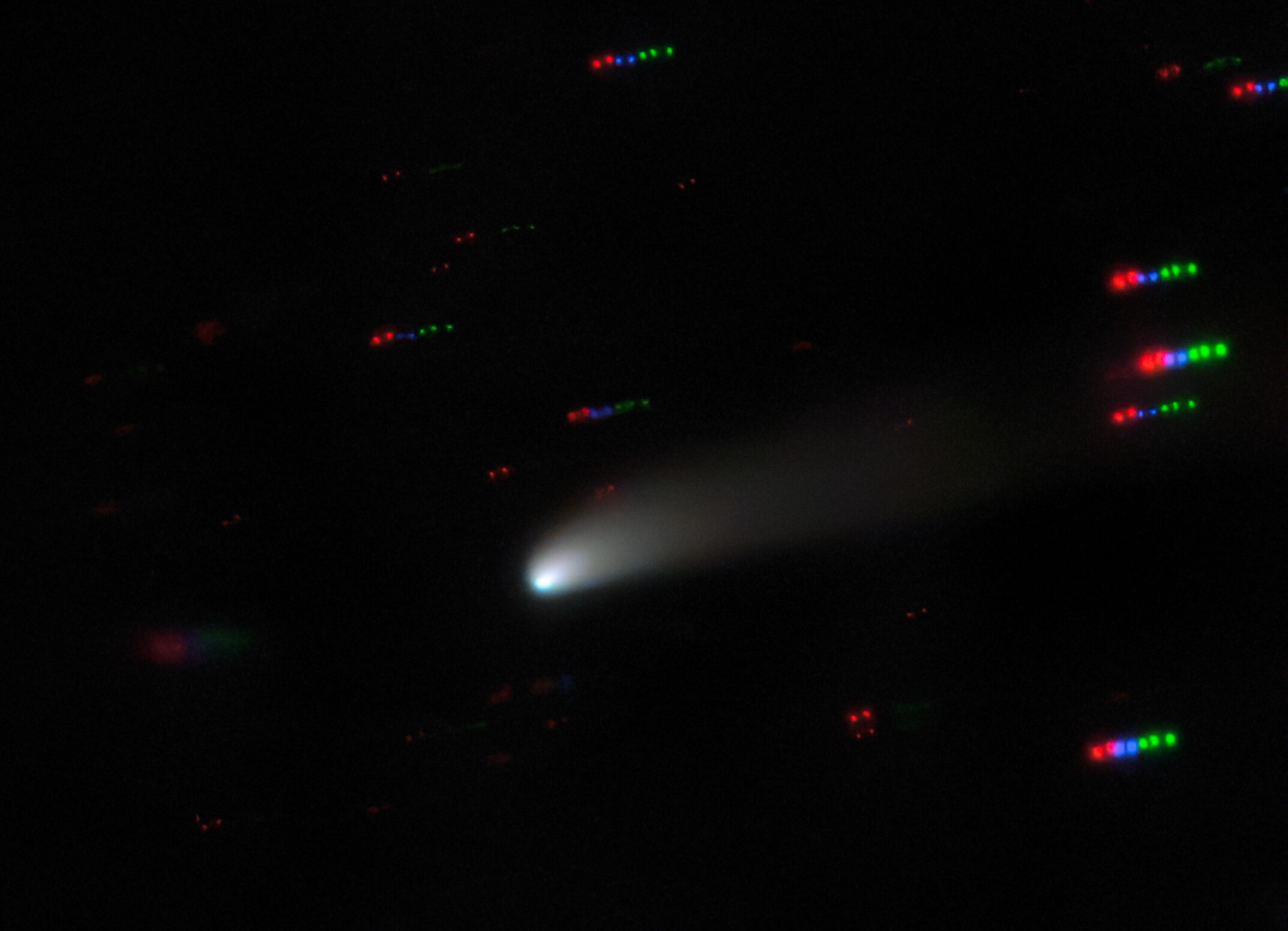
Color composite image of P/2019 LD_{2} tracked by Gemini North

Based on a generic magnitude-to-diameter conversion, P/2019 LD_{2} measures approximately 14 kilometers in diameter, for an assumed albedo of 0.12 as the median for small Jupiter trojans, and an absolute magnitude of 12.2. However if the comet displays activity, that can lead to the nucleus size being overestimated. Archival images by DECam from March 2017 indicate that the comet was dimmer than magnitude 23.8 at that time, indicating that the nucleus's radius is less than 1.2 km assuming a 0.05 albedo or less than 0.8 km assuming an 11.2% albedo. Broadband observations taken from the Sanglokh Observatory in Tajikistan suggest a revised upper limit to its radius at approximately 6.1 ± 0.1 km (3.790 ± 0.062 mi).

As of May 2020, no rotational light curve of P/2019 LD_{2} has been obtained from photometric observations. The body's rotation period, pole and shape remain unknown. The visible spectrum does not exhibit any evidence of CN, C2, or C3 emission.

During the approach to perihelion in 2020, the comet shed large-grained (0.1 mm typical) dust grains rich with water ice.

== See also ==
- 6478 Gault
- 7968 Elst–Pizarro
- 118401 LINEAR
- (300163) 2006 VW139
