= 165P/LINEAR =

Periodic comet with 76 year orbit

Discovery
- Discovered by: LINEAR
- Discovery date: 29 January 2000

Designations
- MPC designation: P/2000 B4
- Alternative designations: LINEAR 10

Orbital characteristics
- Epoch: March 6, 2006
- Aphelion: 29.15 AU
- Perihelion: 6.852 AU
- Semi-major axis: 18 AU
- Eccentricity: 0.6193
- Orbital period: 76.37 a
- Inclination: 15.8959°
- Last perihelion: June 15, 2000
- Next perihelion: 2075-Oct-14; October 17, 2075

165P/LINEAR is a periodic comet in the Solar System. 165P/LINEAR has a perihelion distance of 6.8 AU, and is a Chiron-type comet with T_{Jupiter} smaller than 3 and a semi-major axis larger than Jupiter's.

Numbered comets
Previous; 164P/Christensen	165P/LINEAR	Next; 166P/NEAT
