= P/2016 P5 (COIAS) =

Periodic comet

Discovery
- Discovered by: Seitaro Urakawa; H. Fukuyama
- Discovery site: Subaru–MKO; Come On! Impacting ASteroids (COIAS)
- Discovery date: 1 August 2016

Designations
- Alternative designations: H431154

Orbital characteristics
- Epoch: 1 December 2015 (JD 2457357.5)
- Observation arc: 18.83 years
- Earliest precovery date: 23 June 2004
- Number of observations: 58
- Aphelion: 4.979 AU
- Perihelion: 4.426 AU
- Semi-major axis: 4.703 AU
- Eccentricity: 0.05885
- Orbital period: 10.198 years
- Inclination: 7.036°
- Longitude of ascending node: 185.48°
- Argument of periapsis: 33.632°
- Last perihelion: 29 May 2023
- Next perihelion: c. 2033
- T_{Jupiter}: 2.990
- Earth MOID: 3.422 AU
- Jupiter MOID: 0.001 AU
- Comet total magnitude (M1): 8.0

P/2016 P5 (COIAS) is a Jupiter-family comet with a 10-year orbit around the Sun. Its discovery was announced on 21 March 2025, when cometary activity was spotted on an asteroidal object that was photographed by the Subaru Telescope in 2016.

It is the second comet discovered through the Come On! Impacting ASteroids (COIAS) campaign. (Note: The first comet discovered by the same program was C/2015 K7 (COIAS))
