= C/2023 RS61 (PanSTARRS) =

Chiron-type comet

C/2023 RS_{61} (PanSTARRS)
Discovery
- Discovered by: Pan-STARRS
- Discovery site: Haleakalā Observatory
- Discovery date: 15 September 2023

Designations
- Alternative designations: PanSTARRS 177

Orbital characteristics
- Epoch: 9 June 2026 (JD 2461200.5)
- Observation arc: 11.01 years (Note: Observation arc from the Minor Planet Center database covering dates from 5 September 2015 until 8 September 2026.)
- Earliest precovery date: 5 September 2015
- Number of observations: 567
- Aphelion: 15.793 AU
- Perihelion: 7.993 AU
- Semi-major axis: 11.893 AU
- Eccentricity: 0.32793
- Orbital period: 41.02 years
- Inclination: 19.947°
- Longitude of ascending node: 347.04°
- Argument of periapsis: 119.56°
- Mean anomaly: 338.15°
- Last perihelion: ~1987
- Next perihelion: 4 December 2028
- T_{Jupiter}: 3.123
- Earth MOID: 7.066 AU
- Jupiter MOID: 3.121 AU

Physical characteristics
- Mean radius: 4.7 km (2.9 mi)
- Geometric albedo: 0.05–0.12 (assumed)
- Comet total magnitude (M1): 6.5

C/2023 RS_{61} (PanSTARRS) is a Chiron-type comet and centaur with a 41-year orbit around the Sun. It is one of many comets discovered by the Pan-STARRS survey.

== Observational history ==
It was initially discovered as an asteroid-like object on 15 September 2023. Precovery images from the DECam instrument as early as September 2015 were identified.

== Physical characteristics ==
Archival data from Pan-STARRS reveal that C/2023 RS_{61} had two outbursts occurring on 2017 and 2023, making it one of a few outbursting centaurs similar to 174P/Echeclus. The 2017 outburst occurred while the comet was at a distance of 13.5 AU (2,020 million km) from the Sun, which also makes it the second most distant active centaur known after 95P/Chiron.

The bare nucleus measures around 4.7–7.0 km (2.9–4.3 mi) in radius, assuming a typical geometric albedo relative to other centaurs (0.05–0.12).
