= 170P/Christensen =

Jupiter-family comet

- Comet Christensen 4 imaged from the Zwicky Transient Facility on 7 October 2023

Discovery
- Discovered by: Eric J. Christensen
- Discovery date: 17 June 2005

Designations
- MPC designation: P/2005 M1
- Alternative designations: Christensen 4

Orbital characteristics
- Epoch: 21 November 2025 (JD 2461000.5)
- Observation arc: 19.63 years (Note: Observation arc from the Minor Planet Center database covering dates from 17 June 2005 until 3 February 2025.)
- Number of observations: 1,121
- Aphelion: 5.472 AU
- Perihelion: 2.911 AU
- Semi-major axis: 4.191 AU
- Eccentricity: 0.30541
- Orbital period: 8.581 years
- Inclination: 10.134°
- Longitude of ascending node: 142.64°
- Argument of periapsis: 224.61°
- Mean anomaly: 109.20°
- Last perihelion: 19 April 2023
- Next perihelion: 28 October 2031
- T_{Jupiter}: 2.924
- Earth MOID: 1.933 AU
- Jupiter MOID: 0.271 AU

Physical characteristics
- Mean radius: <11.885 km (7.385 mi)
- Comet total magnitude (M1): 9.4
- Comet nuclear magnitude (M2): 14.3

170P/Christensen, also known as Comet Christensen 4, is a Jupiter-family comet with an 8.58-year orbit around the Sun. It is one of several comets discovered by American astronomer, Eric J. Christensen.

== Observational history ==
Eric J. Christensen discovered a new comet from photographic plates taken from the 1.5-m reflector telescope that is used by the Mount Lemmon Survey (MLS) on 17 June 2005. At the time of discovery, the comet had an apparent magnitude of 19.9 and a condensed, circular coma about 15 arcseconds in length. Additional astrometry later determined that it was a short-periodic comet with an 8.64-year orbit around the Sun. It later received its official numerical designation (170P) alongside 169P/NEAT on 29 August 2005.

== Orbit ==
As of November 2025, Comet 170P/Christensen revolves around the Sun once every 8.58 years, with an orbital inclination of about 10.13 degrees from the ecliptic. Its distance from the Sun varies from 2.911 AU (435.5 million km) and 5.472 AU (818.6 million km).

Prior to discovery, the comet made its closest approach to Jupiter twice in 1921 and 1992, passing by the giant planet at a distance of 0.34 AU (51 million km) and 0.426 AU (63.7 million km) respectively.

== Physical characteristics ==
Infrared observations from NEOWISE give a rough estimate of the size of its nucleus to be at least 23.77 km (14.77 mi) in diameter. However, it is likely that the comet is smaller due to the ongoing activity at the time its size was measured by the telescope.

Extensive observations from the Asteroid Terrestrial-impact Last Alert System (ATLAS) survey between July 2022 and March 2024 showed that the comet reached its maximum dust production rate (≤ 34 kg/sec^{-1}) roughly more than 200 days after reaching perihelion on 19 April 2023.

== Notes ==
Numbered comets
Previous; 169P/NEAT	170P/Christensen	Next; 171P/Spahr
