= 168P/Hergenrother =

Periodic comet

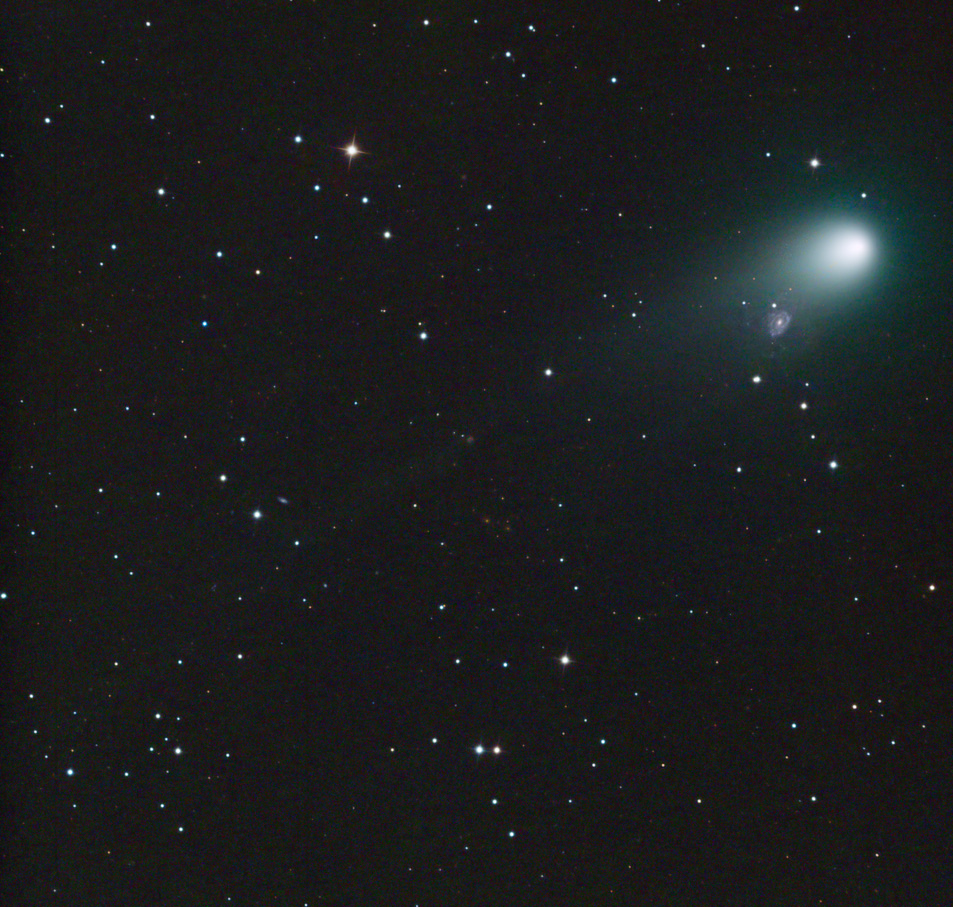
- 168P/Hergenrother during its 2012 outburst as imaged from the Mount Lemmon Observatory

Discovery
- Discovered by: Carl W. Hergenrother
- Discovery site: Catalina Sky Survey
- Discovery date: 22 November 1998

Designations
- MPC designation: P/1998 W2, P/2005 N2

Orbital characteristics
- Epoch: 25 February 2023 (JD 2460000.5)
- Observation arc: 21.12 years (Note: Observation arc from the Minor Planet Center database covering dates from 21 November 1998 until 3 January 2020.)
- Earliest precovery date: 21 November 1998
- Number of observations: 3,633
- Aphelion: 5.817 AU
- Perihelion: 1.357 AU
- Semi-major axis: 3.587 AU
- Eccentricity: 0.62169
- Orbital period: 6.794 years
- Inclination: 21.615°
- Longitude of ascending node: 355.43°
- Argument of periapsis: 15.041°
- Mean anomaly: 188.01°
- Last perihelion: 18 May 2026
- Next perihelion: 25 April 2033
- T_{Jupiter}: 2.663
- Earth MOID: 0.420 AU
- Jupiter MOID: 0.001 AU

Physical characteristics
- Mean diameter: 0.91 km (0.57 mi)
- Comet total magnitude (M1): 7.0
- Comet nuclear magnitude (M2): 15.2
- Apparent magnitude: 8.0 (2012 apparition)

168P/Hergenrother is a periodic comet in the Solar System. The comet, originally named P/1998 W2, returned in 2005 and got the temporary name P/2005 N2. It was last observed in January 2020 and may have continued fragmenting after the 2012 outburst. It was last observed in 2020 and came to perihelion in May 2026. It will return to perihelion in 2033.

== Observational history ==
=== Discovery ===
On 22 November 1998, Carl W. Hergenrother spotted a new comet from CCD images taken by Timothy B. Spahr a day earlier with the Catalina Sky Survey's 0.41 m (16 in) telescope. Preliminary orbital calculations by Brian G. Marsden reveal that the comet has a periodic orbit of 6.78 years. At the time, the comet was a 17th-magnitude object within the constellation Ursa Minor. (Note: Reported initial position upon discovery was: α = 21^{h} 15^{m} 03.67^{s}, δ = –14° 37′ 45″)

Between 2000 and 2002, Kazuo Kinoshita and Shuichi Nakano independently used the comet's positions during its 1998 apparition to predict its next perihelion date, which is around 2 November 2005. It was successfully recovered by Australian astronomer, David Herald, on 6 November 2005.

=== 2012 outburst ===
The comet came to perihelion on 1 October 2012, and was expected to reach about apparent magnitude 15.2, but due to an outburst the comet reached apparent magnitude 8. As a result of the outburst of gas and dust, the comet was briefly more than 500 times brighter than it would have been without the outburst. (Note: Apparent magnitude: $(\sqrt[5]{100})^{15.2-8}\approx 758$) On 19 October, images by the Virtual Telescope Project showed a dust cloud trailing the nucleus. Images by the 2 m (79 in) Faulkes Telescope North on 26 October, confirm a fragmentation event. The secondary fragment was about magnitude 17. Further observations by the 8.1 m (320 in) Gemini telescope show that the comet fragmented into at least four parts in six fragmentation events.

=== 2019 apparition ===
168P came to perihelion on 5 August 2019, when it was 76 degrees from the Sun. It then made a closest approach to Earth on 6 November 2019, when it was 1 AU (150 million km) from Earth with a solar elongation of about 110 degrees. It was not recovered until 3 January 2020, when it was 141 degrees from the Sun, but only two observations on a single night were reported.

== Physical characteristics ==
Observations conducted by the Spitzer Space Telescope between 2006 and 2007 showed that Hergenrother's nucleus was originally about 0.96 km (0.60 mi) in diameter before it fragmented on its 2012 outburst. This was later revised to 0.91 km (0.57 mi) upon reanalysis of data in 2020.

== Notes ==
Numbered comets
Previous; 167P/CINEOS	168P/Hergenrother	Next; 169P/NEAT
