= 166P/NEAT =

Chiron-type comet

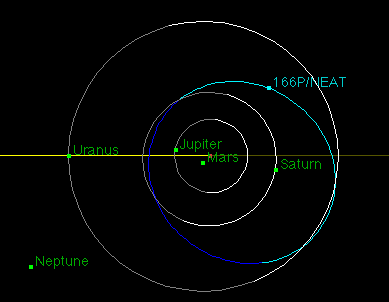
- Simulation of the orbit of 166P/NEAT between Saturn and Uranus

Discovery
- Discovery site: Near Earth Asteroid Tracking (NEAT)
- Discovery date: 15 October 2001

Designations
- MPC designation: P/2001 T4
- Alternative designations: NEAT 8

Orbital characteristics
- Epoch: 21 November 2025 (JD 2461000.5)
- Observation arc: 7.51 years
- Earliest precovery date: 27 August 2001
- Number of observations: 177
- Aphelion: 19.142 AU
- Perihelion: 8.555 AU
- Semi-major axis: 13.849 AU
- Eccentricity: 0.38222
- Orbital period: 51.537 years
- Inclination: 15.386°
- Longitude of ascending node: 64.335°
- Argument of periapsis: 321.99°
- Mean anomaly: 163.94°
- Last perihelion: 20 May 2002
- Next perihelion: 26 November 2053
- T_{Jupiter}: 3.284
- Earth MOID: 7.582 AU
- Jupiter MOID: 3.693 AU

Physical characteristics
- Mean radius: 14.32 km (8.90 mi)
- Spectral type: (B–V) = 0.89±0.11; (V–R) = 0.56±0.03; (B–R) = 1.59±0.05
- Comet total magnitude (M1): 7.0
- Comet nuclear magnitude (M2): 10.6

166P/NEAT is a Chiron-type comet and centaur in the outer Solar System. It was discovered by the Near Earth Asteroid Tracking (NEAT) project in 2001 and initially classified a comet with provisional designation P/2001 T4 (NEAT), as it was apparent from the discovery observations that the body exhibited a cometary coma. It is one of few known bodies with centaur-like orbits that display a coma, along with 60558 Echeclus, 2060 Chiron, 165P/LINEAR and 167P/CINEOS. It is also one of the reddest centaurs ever known.

166P/NEAT has a perihelion distance of 8.56 AU (1.281 billion km).

Numbered comets
Previous; 165P/LINEAR	166P/NEAT	Next; 167P/CINEOS
