= 169P/NEAT =

Jupiter-family comet

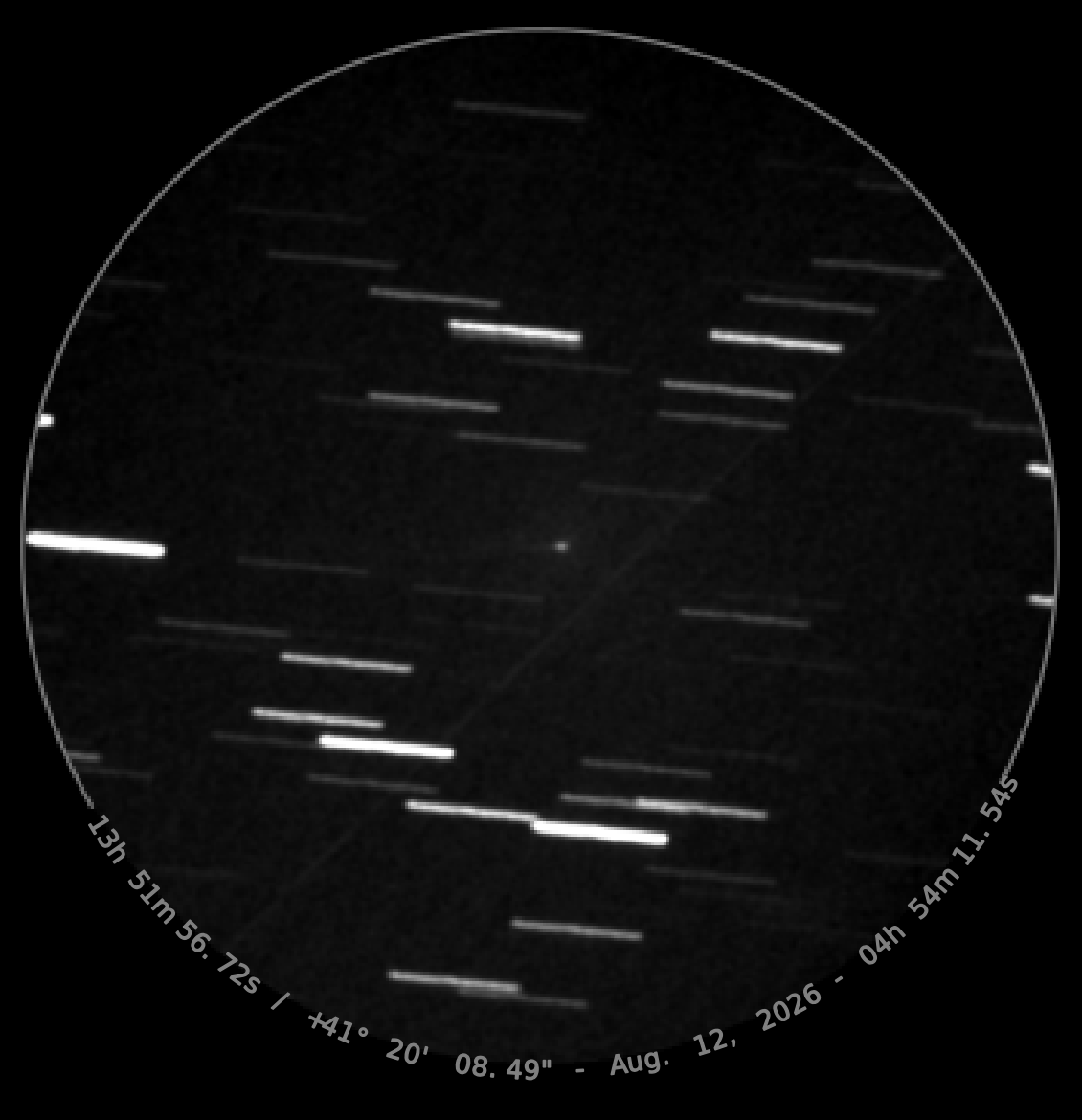
- 169P/NEAT on 12 August 2026 at 4:54 UT with a Unistellar 114mm smart telescope.

Discovery
- Discovered by: NEAT
- Discovery date: 15 March 2002

Designations
- MPC designation: P/2002 EX_{12}
- Alternative designations: NEAT 22

Orbital characteristics
- Epoch: 21 November 2025 (JD 2461000.5)
- Observation arc: 36.15 years
- Earliest precovery date: 7 March 1989
- Number of observations: 1,374
- Aphelion: 4.603 AU
- Perihelion: 0.604 AU
- Semi-major axis: 2.604 AU
- Eccentricity: 0.76796
- Orbital period: 4.201 years
- Inclination: 11.285°
- Longitude of ascending node: 176.04°
- Argument of periapsis: 218.13°
- Mean anomaly: 288.59°
- Last perihelion: 21 September 2026
- Next perihelion: 1 December 2030
- T_{Jupiter}: 2.888
- Earth MOID: 0.142 AU
- Jupiter MOID: 0.978 AU

Physical characteristics
- Mean radius: 2.5 km (1.6 mi)
- Synodic rotation period: 8.369 hours
- Comet total magnitude (M1): 16.8

169P/NEAT is a periodic comet in the Solar System roughly 5 km in diameter with a 4.2 year orbit around the Sun. It is the parent body of the alpha Capricornids meteor shower in late July that may become a major shower around the 23rd century. 169/NEAT may be related to comet P/2003 T12 (SOHO).

As of mid-September 2026, the comet was around apparent magnitude 11. On 2 August 2026 the comet passed less than 1 degree from M13, the Hercules cluster. The closest approach to Earth was on 11 August 2026 at a distance of 0.167 AU (25.0 million km). At perihelion on 21 September 2026 the solar elongation was 34 degrees at a magnitude of approximately 11.

169P/NEAT closest Earth approach on 2026-Aug-11
Date & time of closest approach	Earth distance (AU)	Sun distance (AU)	Velocity wrt Earth (km/s)	Velocity wrt Sun (km/s)	Uncertainty region (3-sigma)	Solar elongation	Reference
2026-Aug-11 19:34	0.167 AU (25.0 million km; 15.5 million mi)	0.953 AU (142.6 million km; 88.6 million mi)	19.9	39.0	± 33 km	64°	Horizons

== Physical characteristics ==
169P is a low activity comet roughly about 5.0 km (3.1 mi) in diameter, with a rotation period lasting about 8.4 hours. It could have originated from the main asteroid belt.

== Orbit ==
It came to perihelion (closest approach to the Sun) on 9 July 2022 and on 13 July 2022 passed 0.1395 AU (20.87 million km) from Venus. On 11 August 2026, it passed 0.1672 AU (25.01 million km) from Earth and reached perihelion on 21 September 2026. It will next come to perihelion on 1 December 2030.

169P has a similar stable orbit with the smaller body P/2003 T_{12} (SOHO), both avoiding close encounters with Jupiter. It is possible that both comets likely fragmented from a parent body a bit over 2,000 years ago. A further fragmentation even about 4,500 to 5,000 years ago could have produced the meteors of the alpha Capricornids meteor shower. The total estimated mass of the meteors is similar to that of the surviving comet.

Numbered comets
Previous; 168P/Hergenrother	169P/NEAT	Next; 170P/Christensen
