= C/2014 OG392 (PanSTARRS) =

Comet

C/2014 OG_{392} (PanSTARRS)
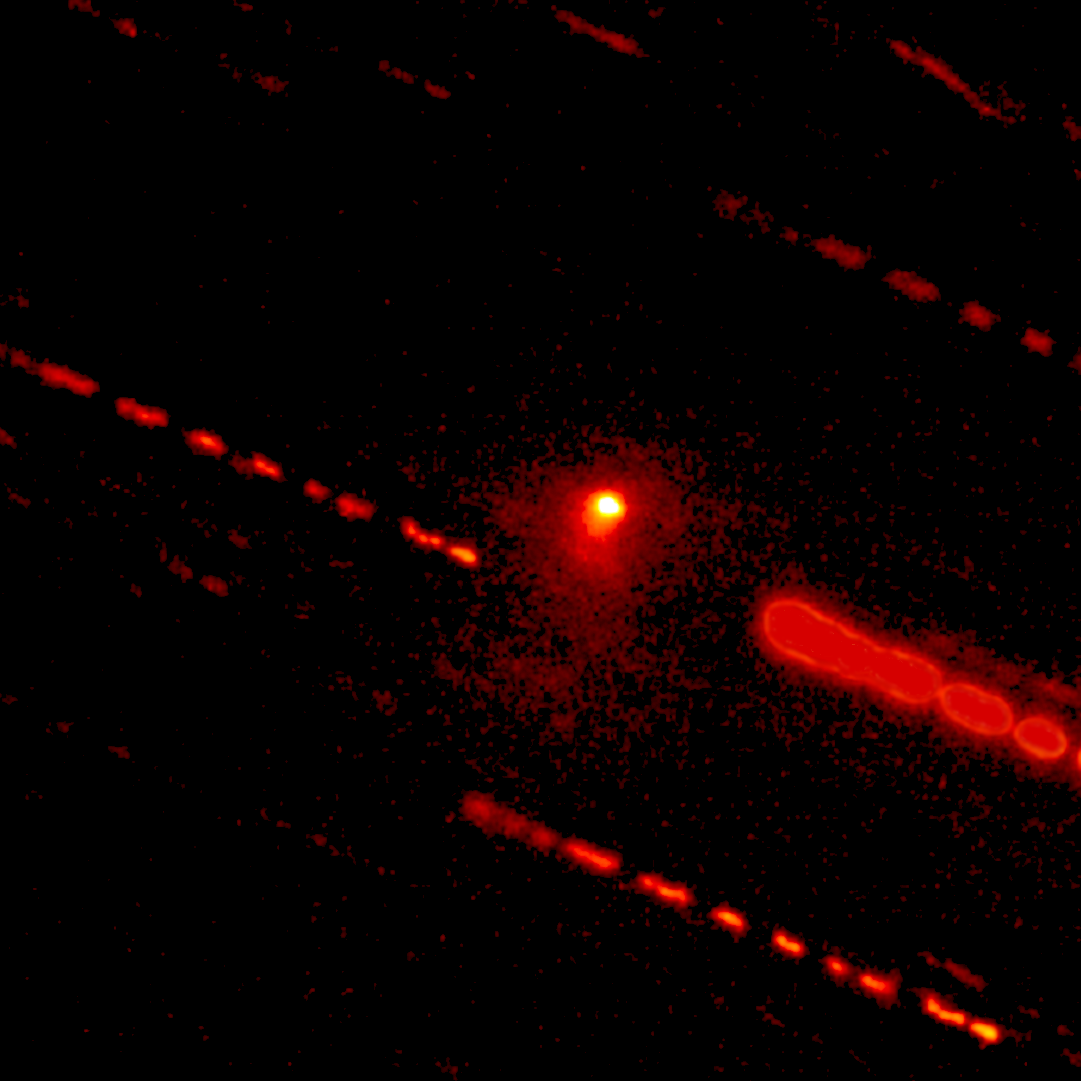
- C/2014 OG_{392} with its coma imaged by the Lowell Discovery Telescope on 14 October 2020

Discovery
- Discovered by: Pan-STARRS
- Discovery date: 28 July 2014

Orbital characteristics
- Epoch: 2020-12-17 (2459200.5)
- Observation arc: 9.3 years
- Orbit type: Centaur / Chiron-type
- Aphelion: 14.463 AU
- Perihelion: 9.9697 AU (near Saturn's distance)
- Semi-major axis: 12.216 AU
- Eccentricity: 0.18389
- Orbital period: 42.7 yr
- Inclination: 9.0333°
- Last perihelion: 29 July 1979
- Next perihelion: 29 November 2021
- T_{Jupiter}: 3.4
- Earth MOID: 8.99 AU (1.345 billion km)
- Jupiter MOID: 5.08 AU (760 million km)

Physical characteristics
- Dimensions: 20 km (albedo=0.1); Absolute magnitude: H=10.8 (MPC); H=11.3 (corrected)

C/2014 OG_{392} (PanSTARRS) is a comet discovered as a centaur on 28 July 2014 when it was 11.5 AU (1.72 billion km) from the Sun and had an apparent magnitude of 21. The comet was relatively easier to detect at this distance because the nucleus is estimated to be 20 km in diameter.

DECam images from 2017 of the comet at 10.6 AU (1.59 billion km) from the Sun showed activity likely produced by carbon dioxide (CO_{2}) and/or ammonia (NH_{3}) sublimation (off-gassing).

Clones of the orbit of C/2014 OG_{392} estimate a dynamic lifetime (amount of time in the current orbit) of 13 thousand to a million years.

Perihelion (closest approach to the Sun) takes place not far from Saturn's orbit with a Saturn minimum orbit intersection distance of 0.9 AU (130 million km); for example on 29 September 2231 at about 0.934 AU (139.7 million km) ±1 million km from Saturn.

C/2014 OG_{392} came to opposition on 1 November 2021 in the constellation of Cetus when it will have a solar elongation of 170 degrees. Numerical integration shows the comet last came to perihelion on 29 November 2021 and came to perihelion previously in late July 1979.
