= C/2015 D1 (SOHO) =

Sungrazing comet

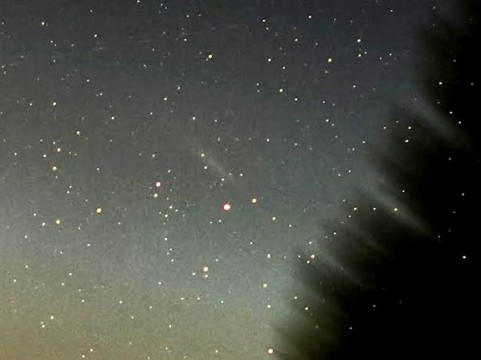
- Remnant tail of C/2015 D1 (SOHO) imaged after perihelion on 27 February 2015

Discovery
- Discovered by: SOHO; Worachate Boonplod; Karl Battams
- Discovery date: 18 February 2015

Designations
- Alternative designations: SOHO-2875

Orbital characteristics
- Epoch: 20 February 2015 (JD 2457073.5)
- Observation arc: 3 days
- Earliest precovery date: 17 February 2015
- Number of observations: 417
- Aphelion: 9.949 AU
- Perihelion: 0.028 AU
- Semi-major axis: 4.989 AU
- Eccentricity: 0.99432
- Orbital period: 11.144 years
- Inclination: 69.616°
- Longitude of ascending node: 95.881°
- Argument of periapsis: 234.96°
- Mean anomaly: 0.022°
- Last perihelion: 19 February 2015
- Next perihelion: Disintegrated
- T_{Jupiter}: 1.116
- Earth MOID: 0.516 AU
- Jupiter MOID: 3.566 AU

Physical characteristics
- Mean radius: ~0.05–0.15 km (0.031–0.093 mi)
- Mass: ~10^{8}–10^{9} kg
- Mean density: 0.4 g/cm^{–3} (assumed)
- Comet total magnitude (M1): 8.0

C/2015 D1 (SOHO) is a sungrazing comet that was discovered through images taken by the Solar and Heliospheric Observatory (SOHO) in 2015. It is one of a few comets discovered by SOHO that were successfully detected by ground observations.
