= P/2003 T12 (SOHO) =

Periodic comet

Discovery
- Discovered by: SOHO
- Discovery date: 10 October 2003

Designations
- MPC designation: P/2003 T12; P/2012 A3
- Alternative designations: SOHO-643; STEREO-42

Orbital characteristics
- Epoch: 25 May 2012 (JD 2456072.5)
- Observation arc: 4,592 days (12.57 years)
- Number of observations: 491
- Aphelion: 4.5612 AU
- Perihelion: 0.5748 AU
- Semi-major axis: 2.568 AU
- Eccentricity: 0.77617
- Orbital period: 4.1153 years
- Inclination: 11.4752°
- Longitude of ascending node: 176.466°
- Argument of periapsis: 217.669°
- Last perihelion: 3 July 2024
- Next perihelion: 29 August 2028
- T_{Jupiter}: 2.894
- Earth MOID: 0.1547 AU
- Jupiter MOID: 1.0191 AU

Physical characteristics
- Mean radius: <0.26 km (0.16 mi)
- Comet total magnitude (M1): 19.6
- Apparent magnitude: 8.5 (2012 apparition)

P/2003 T12 is a periodic comet that revolves around the Sun once every 4.11 years. On 13 January 2012, it was observed by the satellite STEREO-B, and the most documented phase of P/2003 T12 was observed on that date. It is hypothesized to be a possible fragment of comet 169P/NEAT. It will reach perihelion in August 2028.

== 12 January 2012 event ==
During its apparition on 12 January 2012, it ventured into the highest phase angle ever observed for a comet, and the forward-scattering enhancement in brightness was marked, as large as ~8.5 mag. This has given insight into Henyey-Greenstein (HG) space-dust.
