= (62412) 2000 SY178 =

Active main belt asteroid

(62412) 2000 SY_{178}
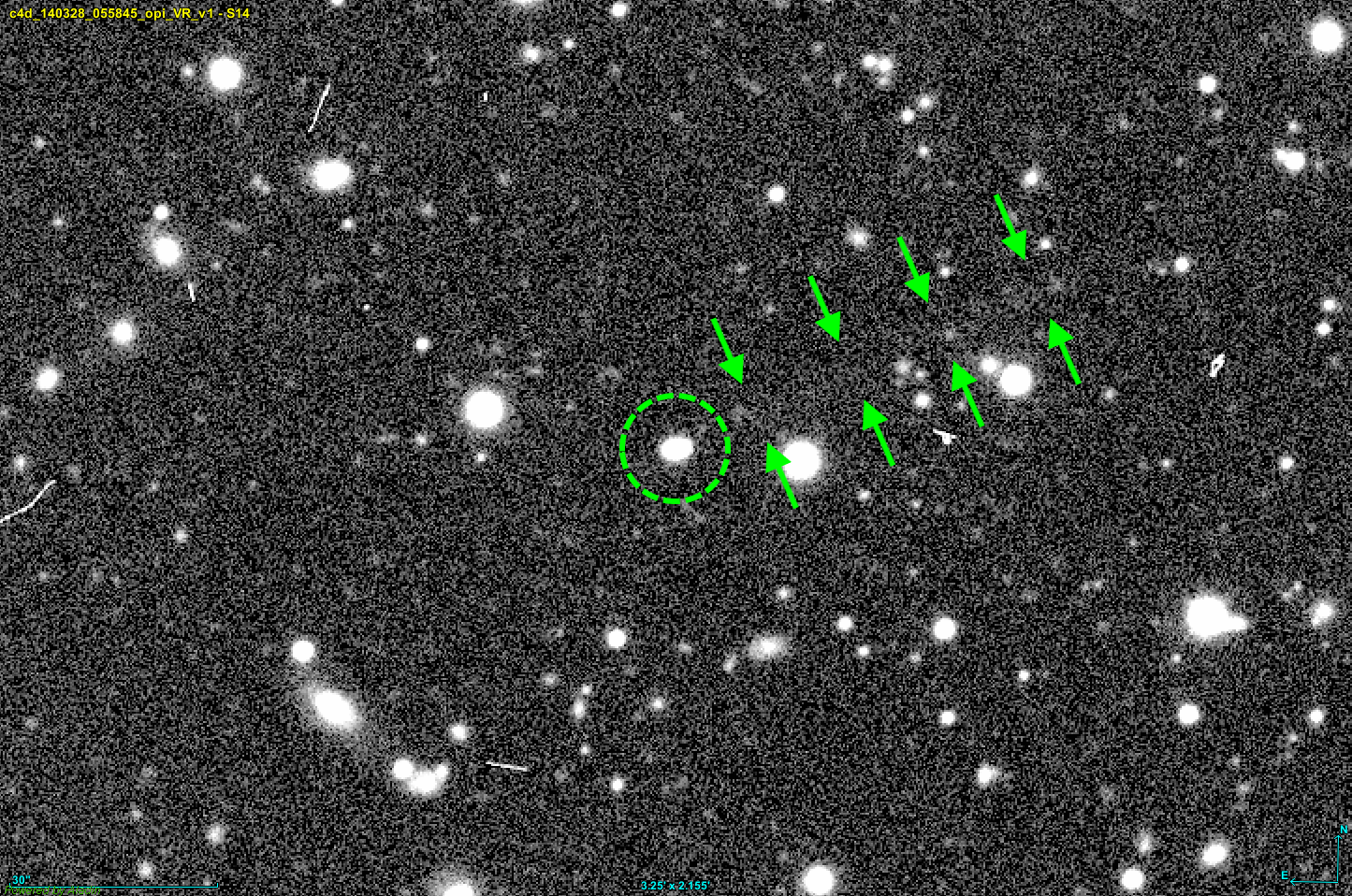
- 2000 SY_{178} imaged by the Dark Energy Camera on 28 March 2014. The asteroid's faint tail is marked with green arrows.

Discovery
- Discovered by: LINEAR
- Discovery site: Socorro, United States
- Discovery date: 28 September 2000

Designations
- Minor planet category: Main belt

Orbital characteristics
- Epoch 21 November 2025 (JD 2461000.5)
- Uncertainty parameter 0
- Aphelion: 3.3932 AU
- Perihelion: 2.9152 AU
- Semi-major axis: 3.1542 AU
- Eccentricity: 0.0758
- Orbital period (sidereal): 5.602 yr (2046.111 d)
- Mean anomaly: 86.746°
- Mean motion: 0.1759° / day
- Inclination: 4.7063°
- Longitude of ascending node: 328.814°
- Argument of perihelion: 169.867°
- Earth MOID: 1.9279 AU
- Jupiter MOID: 1.6295 AU
- T_{Jupiter}: 3.197

Physical characteristics
- Dimensions: ~6.4 × 4.2 km
- Mean diameter: 10.374±0.342 km
- Mean density: 1.5 g/cm^{3} (assumed)
- Sidereal rotation period: 3.33±0.01 h
- Geometric albedo: 0.0653±0.0097
- Spectral type: C-type g–r = 0.43±0.02 r–i = 0.14±0.02 i–z = −0.01±0.02
- Absolute magnitude (H): 13.86 (JPL)

(62412) 2000 SY_{178} is an unnamed active asteroid located in the outer main asteroid belt. It was discovered by the Lincoln Near-Earth Asteroid Research (LINEAR) project at Socorro, New Mexico on 28 September 2000. It is a member of the extensive Hygiea family, which originated from the large asteroid 10 Hygiea around 3 billion years ago. It is around 10 km (6.2 mi) in size and rotates rapidly, revolving once every 3.33 hours. 2000 SY_{178}'s activity was first observed in 2014, when it briefly hosted a faint comet-like tail.

== Orbit ==
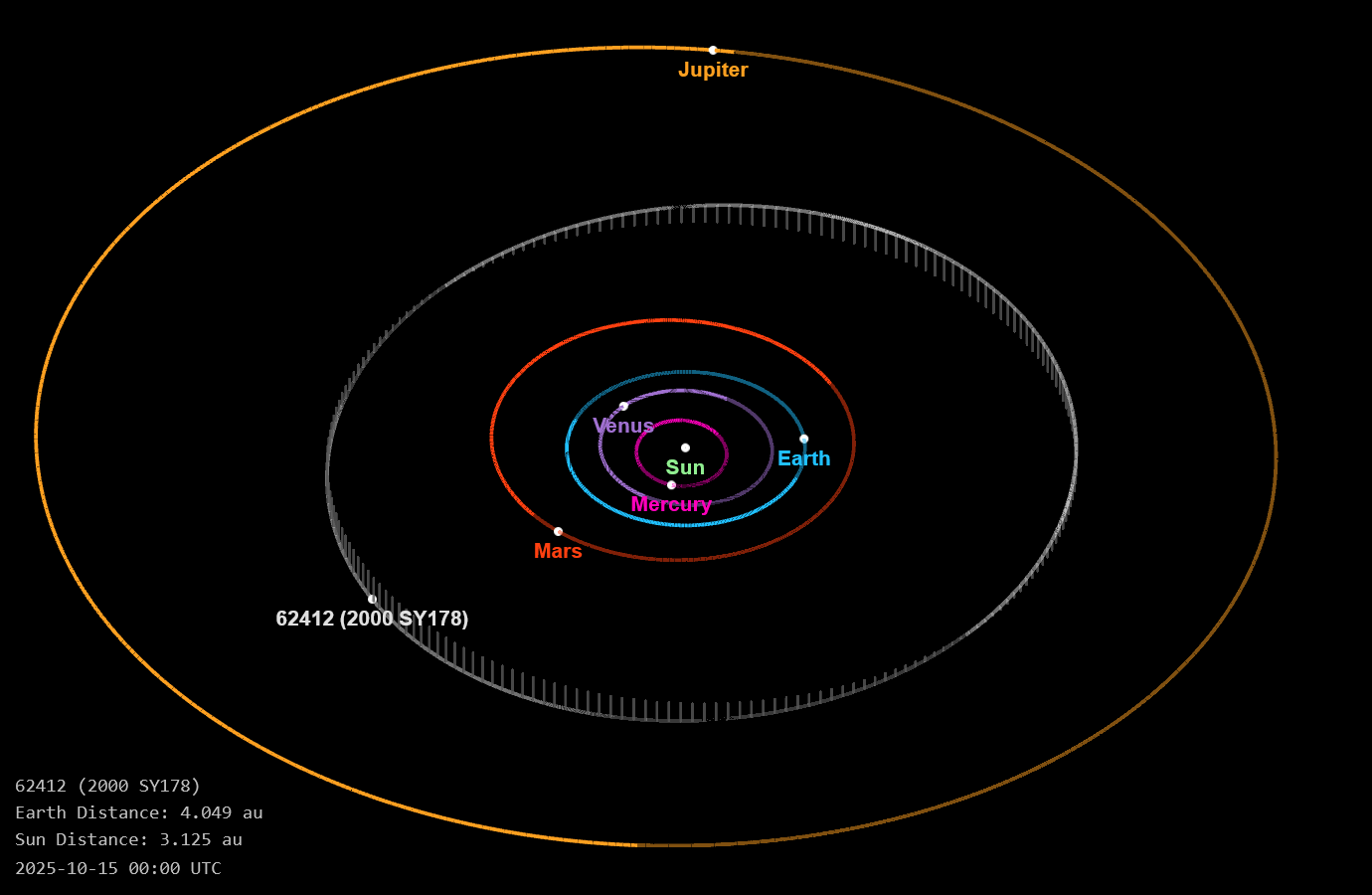
A diagram of 2000 SY_{178}'s orbit, with the orbits of the inner planets and Jupiter shown.

2000 SY_{178} orbits with an average orbital distance of 3.15 astronomical units (AU), placing it in the outer main asteroid belt. Along its orbit, its distance from the Sun varies from 2.92 AU at perihelion to 3.39 AU at aphelion due to its orbital eccentricity of 0.08. It has a moderate orbital inclination of 4.7° with respect to the ecliptic plane and takes 5.6 years to complete one orbit. It has a Jovian Tisserand's parameter (T_{J}) of 3.2, typical for main belt asteroids and outside the typical T_{J} value of 2–3 for Jupiter family comets. Its orbit is stable over the age of the Solar System; it has a Lyapunov time of 1.53 billion years (Gyr).

2000 SY_{178}'s orbital characteristics place it within the Hygiea family, an extensive asteroid family associated with 10 Hygiea. The Hygiea family is likely very old, with an estimated age of 3.2+0.12
−0.38 Gyr. Within this family, 2000 SY_{178} is associated with a candidate group of eight asteroids, of which the largest member is 4848 Tutenchamun. This group resides close to the 2:1 mean-motion resonance with Jupiter at 3.148 AU.

== Physical characteristics ==
2000 SY_{178}'s effective radius, when calculated from its absolute magnitude and geometric albedo, is 5.187 ± 0.171 km (3.223 ± 0.106 mi). Analysis of its lightcurve, or variations in observed brightness over time, shows that it has a rapid rotation of 3.33±0.01 hours. The amplitude of 2000 SY_{178}'s lightcurve suggests that it is elongated, with an a/b ≥ 1.51. Based on its rotation period and elongated shape, 2000 SY_{178}'s inferred density is about 1.5 g/cm^{3} (Note: Assuming it is a strengthless rubble pile.)—typical for C-type asteroids but denser than comets. 2000 SY_{178} is small enough that its current rotation period is unlikely to be primordial, suggesting that some mechanism has modified its spin. However, it is large and distant enough that it lies near the threshold where the YORP effect can significantly modify its spin. If YORP spinup is not responsible for its current rotation period, then an impact event or the sublimation of ice on its surface could explain its rapid rotation.

2000 SY_{178} is a dark asteroid, with a geometric albedo of about 0.0653. Spectroscopic observations reveal that it has a flat spectral slope that, in combination with its low albedo, is consistent with a C-type classification. Its color closely correlates with those of other Hygiea family members, which is primarily composed of C-type asteroids.

=== Activity ===
On 28 March 2014, 2000 SY_{178} was coincidentally imaged by the Cerro Tololo Inter-American Observatory's Dark Energy Camera (DECam) during a survey searching for extreme trans-Neptunian objects. Three DECam images discovered a faint tail extending about one arcminute away from the asteroid, making 2000 SY_{178} the thirteenth identified active asteroid in the main asteroid belt. Followup observations did not detect a coma, and by 29 August the tail had disappeared. 2000 SY_{178} passed perihelion on 21 March 2013, about one year before its tail was first detected. The delay is consistent with ice sublimation with thermal lag, but the asteroid's low eccentricity and high perihelion suggest that near-perihelion activity may be coincidental. 2000 SY_{178}'s fast rotation, close to the point of breakup, likely plays a role in its activity. The alignment of its tail suggests that it is composed of relatively large particles, which could be the remnants of a prior outburst or material ejected by rapid rotation. The rapid rotation also likely shifts material on its surface, which could expose fresh ice that could then sublimate away.

== See also ==
- Active Asteroids – a citizen science project dedicated to finding active asteroids in Dark Energy Camera images
