= 6478 Gault =

Active main belt asteroid

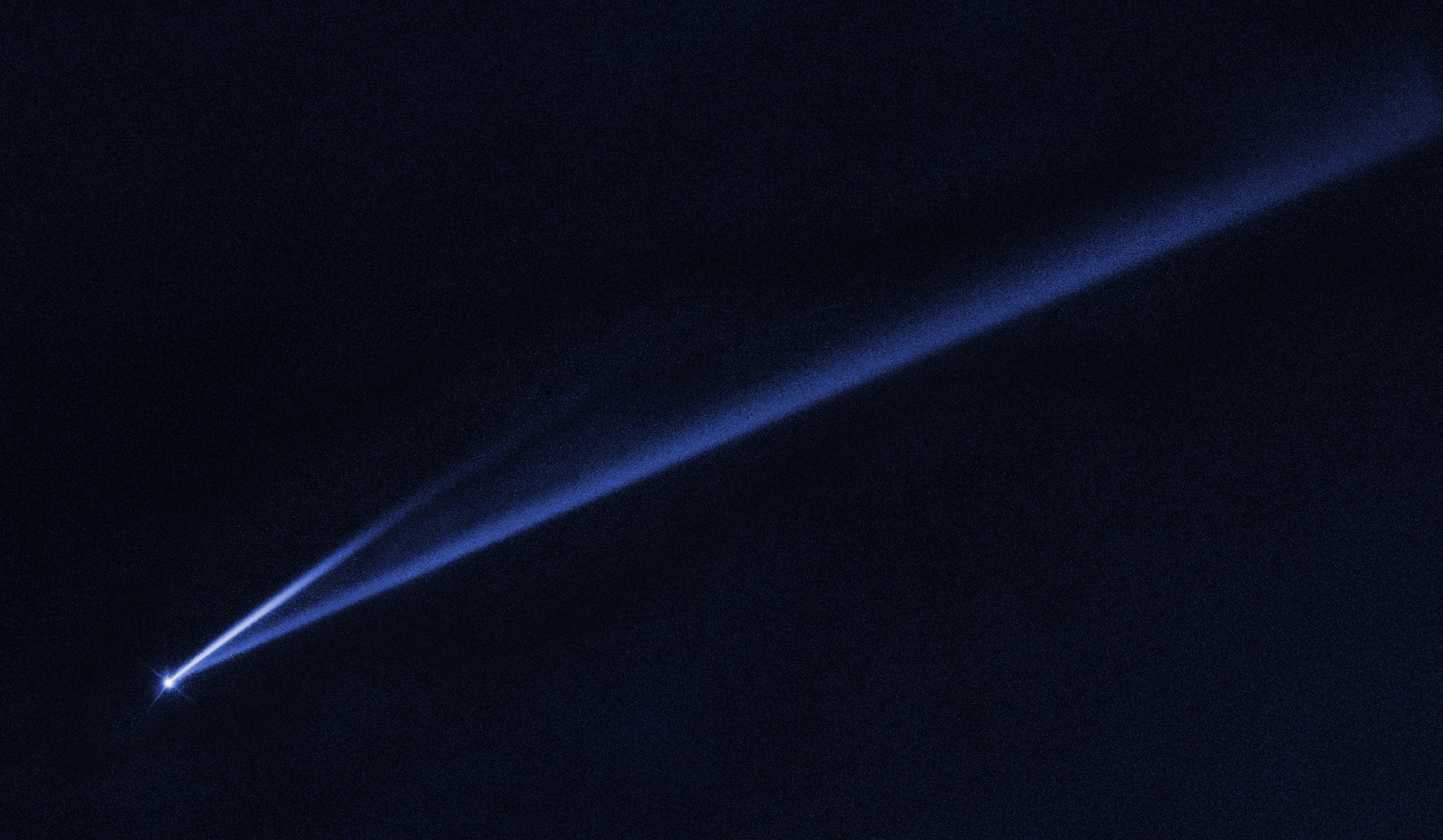
- Gault's two comet-like tails seen from Hubble on 5 February 2019

Discovery
- Discovered by: C. Shoemaker; E. Shoemaker
- Discovery site: Palomar Obs.
- Discovery date: 12 May 1988

Designations
- Pronunciation: /ˈɡɔːlt/
- Named after: Donald Gault (American planetary geologist)
- Alternative designations: 1988 JC_{1} · 1995 KC_{1}
- Minor planet category: main-belt · (inner); Phocaea · MBC

Orbital characteristics
- Epoch 17 December 2020 (JD 2459200.5)
- Uncertainty parameter 0
- Observation arc: 62.10 yr (22,681 d)
- Earliest precovery date: 3 September 1957
- Aphelion: 2.7513 AU
- Perihelion: 1.8587 AU
- Semi-major axis: 2.3050 AU
- Eccentricity: 0.1936
- Orbital period (sidereal): 3.50 yr (1,278 d)
- Mean anomaly: 98.412°
- Mean motion: 0° 16^{m} 53.76^{s} / day
- Inclination: 22.813°
- Longitude of ascending node: 183.538°
- Time of perihelion: 2023-Jul-04
- Argument of perihelion: 83.172°

Physical characteristics
- Mean diameter: 2.8^{+0.4}_{−0.2} km
- Synodic rotation period: 2.4929±0.0003 h
- Geometric albedo: 0.26±0.05; 0.13±0.04
- Spectral type: S (est. family-based)
- Absolute magnitude (H): 14.4

6478 Gault (provisional designation 1988 JC_{1}) is a Phocaea asteroid from the inner regions of the asteroid belt, approximately 3.7 kilometers (2.3 miles) in diameter. The likely S-type asteroid was discovered on 12 May 1988 by astronomer couple Carolyn and Eugene Shoemaker at the Palomar Observatory in California. It was named in honor of planetary geologist Donald Gault. In January 2019, it was found that Gault shows cometary activity and that it has multiple tails, making it an active asteroid. It was subsequently realised that it had been active since at least 2013.

== Orbit and classification ==
Gault is a core member of the Phocaea family (701). The large asteroid family consists of nearly 2,000 known stony asteroids, and was named after its largest member, 25 Phocaea. The old family formed up to 2.2 billion years ago and has the highest inclination of all families in the inner asteroid belt. Several of its members are also Mars-crossing asteroids with high eccentricities.

It orbits the Sun at a distance of 1.9–2.8 astronomical units (AU) once every 3 years and 6 months (1,278 days; semi-major axis of 2.31 AU). Its orbit has an eccentricity of 0.19 and an inclination of 23° with respect to the ecliptic. The body's observation arc begins with its official discovery observation at Palomar in May 1988. It last came to perihelion in July 2023 and will next come to perihelion in January 2027.

== Naming ==
This minor planet was named in memory of American planetary geologist Donald Gault (1923–1999), an expert in the field of impact crater forming processes. Gault conducted field experiments and applied his insight to the interpretation of impact data from the Moon, Earth, Mars and Mercury. The official naming citation was published by the Minor Planet Center on 28 July 1999 (M.P.C. 35484).

== Physical characteristics ==
Gault's spectral type resembles that of a stony S-type asteroid, according its membership to the Phocaea family, but some of the features of the spectrum are more similar to the carbonaceous C-type asteroid class. Based on a generic magnitude-to-diameter conversion, the asteroid measures approximately 3.7 kilometers in diameter, for an assumed family-specific albedo of 0.22, and an absolute magnitude of 14.4. Rotational lightcurves of Gault obtained from photometric observations in 2019 showed a rotation period of either 1.79 or 3.36 hours. The body's pole and shape remain unknown, but based on its lightcurve, its surface likely has irregularities and concavities.

=== Cometary activity ===
On 5 January 2019, it was discovered that Gault possesses a comet tail, which had not been present in previous images taken during the 2018/19 opposition. The asteroid began to break up as its spin accelerated due to the YORP effect, and its rotation speed approached two hours – near the limit of stability for an asteroid. The ejected matter created two dust tails, and the longer one has been estimated at over 800,000 km (500,000 mi) long. Earlier hypotheses of a collision with another asteroid were ruled out as a source of the tail-forming dust, and its two tails were believed to be a result of sudden dust ejections near 28 October to 30 December 2018. It is also possible that solar heating caused sublimation of ice, perhaps beneath the surface in a "pocket", and the force of the ejection of material (after being exposed to solar heating during the rotation of the asteroid) resulted in the spin rate increase. A prior example of such an occurrence is in the literature.

In April 2019, upon analyzing archive images taken in 2013, 2016 and 2017, it was found that Gault had been perpetually active for at least five years before the discovery, with a tail visible when the asteroid was near its furthest distance from the Sun during the 2013 apparition. If its activity is indeed caused by a rotational breakup, then Gault has remained active far longer than any other object of this type seen before. This indicates that it may represent a new type of object.

Between late 2018 and early 2019, the asteroid underwent multiple outbursts with tails morphologically similar to the ejecta from Dimorphos following the Double Asteroid Redirection Test (DART) mission. The first outbursts occurred on 18 October, and the second outbursts occurred on 24 December. They released a mass of 2×10^{7} kg and 1×10^{6} kg, respectively. The ejected dust grains consist of particles up to 10 μm in size and have velocities below a meter per second regardless of particle size. Previous observations of Gault shown no record of activity.

== Gallery ==
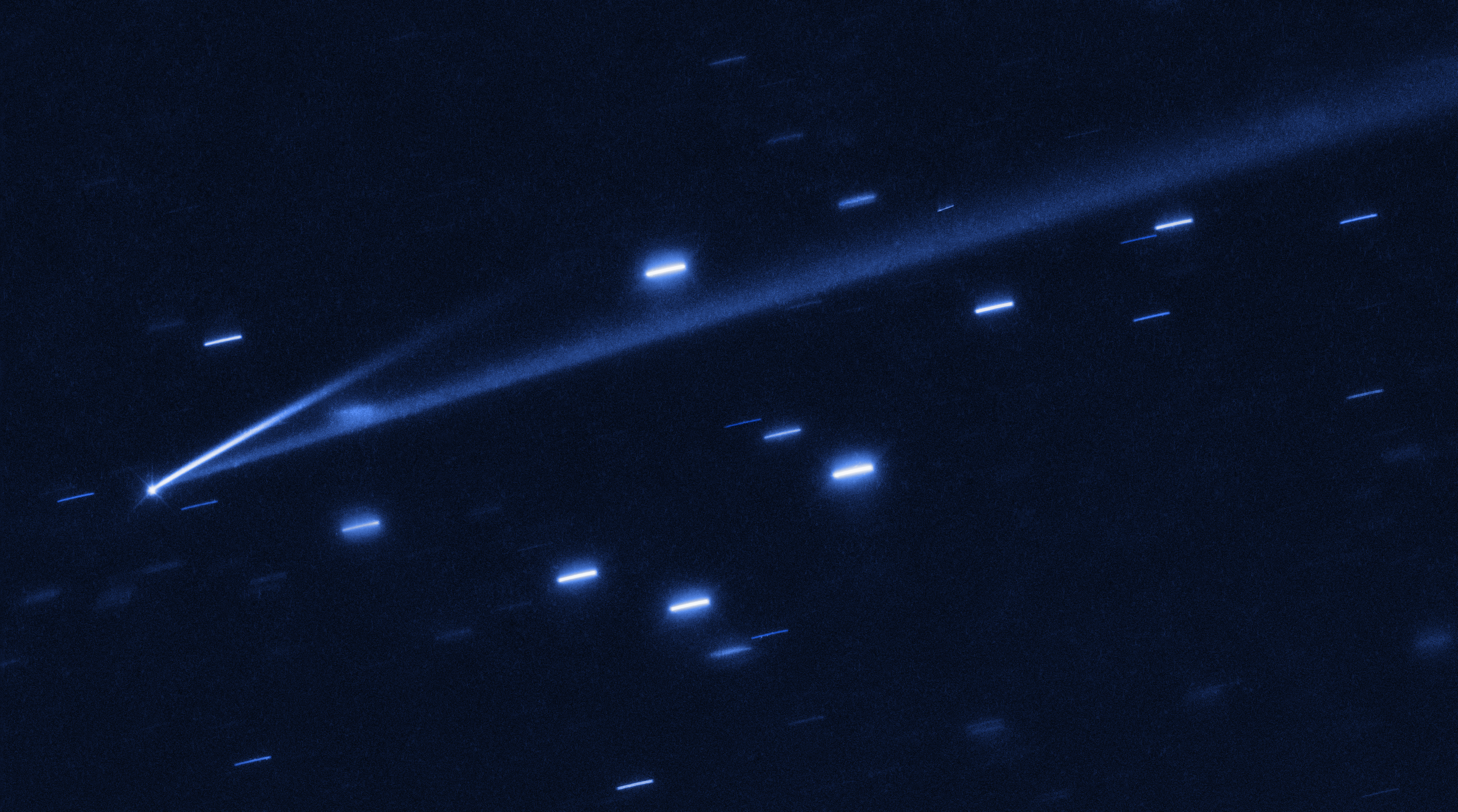
Background stars surrounding asteroid 6478 Gault and its tails.

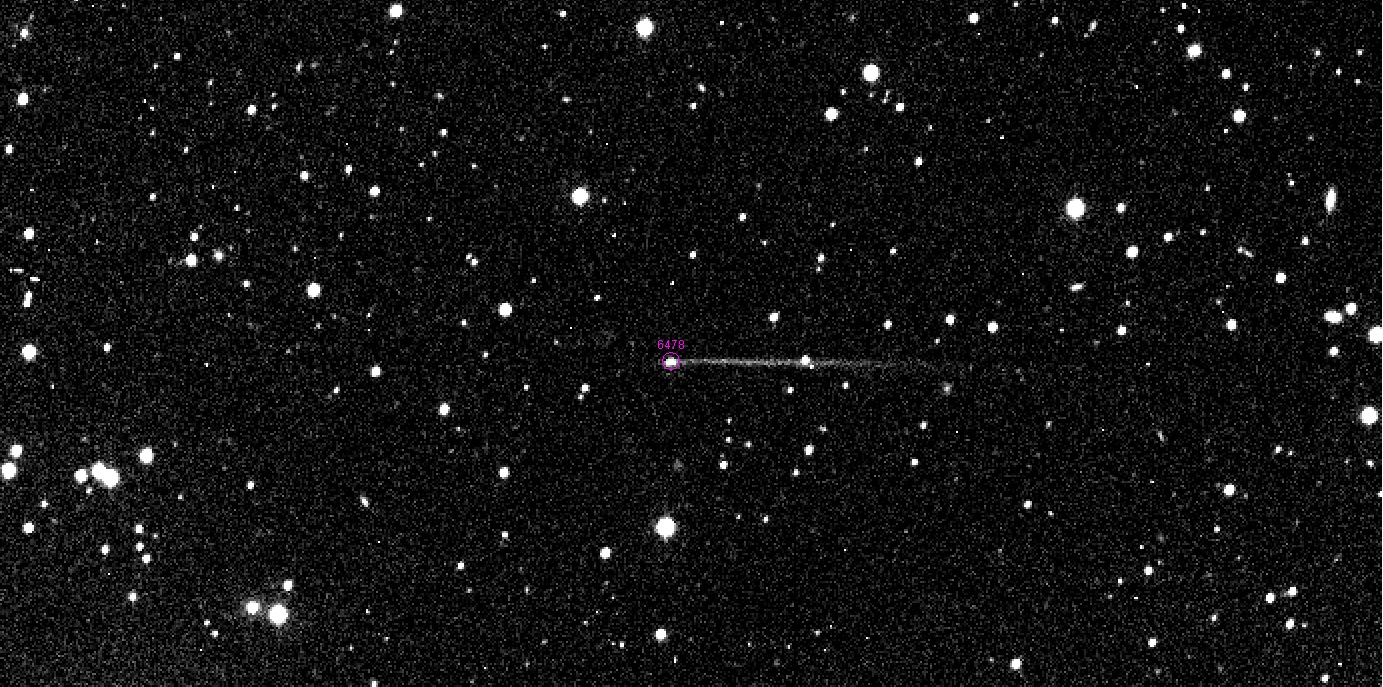
(6478) Gault imaged on 2019-03-26 with iTelescope's T21

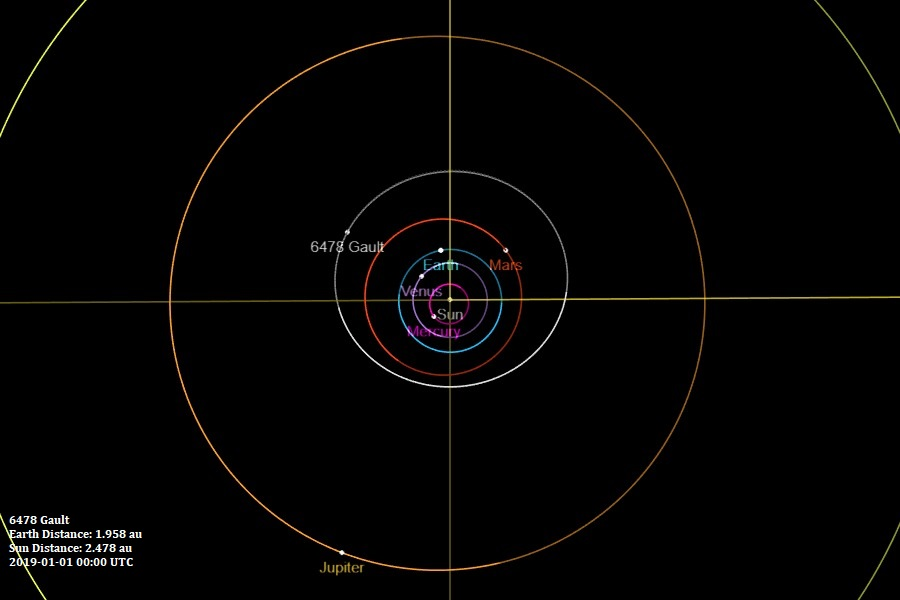
JPL Small-Body Database Browser's Orbit Diagram for the Main-belt Asteroid 6478 Gault on 2019-01-01 at 00:00 UTC
