= Quasi-Hilda comet =

A quasi-Hilda comet (QHC) is a Jupiter-family comet that interacts strongly with Jupiter and undergoes extended temporary capture by it. These comets are associated with the Hilda asteroid zone in the 3:2 inner mean-motion resonance with Jupiter. Typically, asteroids in this zone have a semimajor axis between 3.70 and 4.20 AU, eccentricities below 0.30, and inclinations of no more than 20°. Comets can be temporarily perturbed into this group and then perturbed back out again. Eight percent of the comets that leave the 3:2 resonance end up impacting Jupiter.

== Known quasi-Hilda comets ==
These numbered comets belong to the group of quasi-Hilda comets:

Full Name	MPC designations	Nucleus radii	Aphelion (Q)	Eccentricity	Inclination	Perihelion date	Ref
36P/Whipple	P/1925 QD; P/1933 U1; P/1940 R1	2.55 km	5.27	0.261	9.92	2011-12-29	MPC · JPL
74P/Smirnova–Chernykh	P/1967 EU; P/1975 E2	2.23 km	4.78	0.147	6.65	2009-07-26	MPC · JPL
82P/Gehrels	P/1975 U1; P/1984 P1	0.71 km	4.65	0.122	1.12	2010-01-12	MPC · JPL
111P/Helin–Roman–Crockett	P/1989 A2	0.46–1.39 km	4.61	0.140	4.23	2013-01-30	MPC · JPL
117P/Helin–Roman–Alu	P/1989 T2	16.4 km	5.13	0.253	8.69	2014-03-28	MPC · JPL
129P/Shoemaker–Levy	P/1991 C1; P/1996 U1	1.65 km	4.85	0.170	3.29	2014-02-07	MPC · JPL
135P/Shoemaker–Levy	P/1992 G2; P/1998 B1	1.38 km	4.93	0.289	6.05	2014-11-01	MPC · JPL
147P/Kushida–Muramatsu	P/1993 X1; P/2000 T2	0.22 km	4.85	0.276	2.36	2008-09-22	MPC · JPL
212P/NEAT	P/2000 YN_{30}	0.85 km	6.20	0.579	22.4	2008-12-03	MPC · JPL
215P/NEAT	P/2002 O8; P/2009 B5	1.825 km	4.83	0.200	12.7	2010-06-06	MPC · JPL
228P/LINEAR	P/2001 YX_{127}	2.41 km	4.89	0.176	7.91	2011-08-26	MPC · JPL
231P/LINEAR–NEAT	P/2003 CP_{7} P/2009 X1	–	5.01	0.246	12.3	2011-05-16	MPC · JPL
246P/NEAT	P/2004 F3; P/2010 V2	1.01 km	5.17	0.286	15.9	2013-01-28	MPC · JPL
282P/2003 BM80	P/2003 BM_{80} P/2003 FV_{112}	1.7 km	5.04	0.188	5.81	2021-10-24	MPC · JPL
362P/2008 GO98	P/2008 GO_{98}	7.75–10.05 km	5.08	0.279	15.6	2024-07-20	MPC · JPL
482P/PanSTARRS	P/2014 VF_{40}	–	5.62	0.493	24.5	2023-06-01	MPC · JPL
484P/Spacewatch	P/2005 XR_{132}	1.7 km	5.39	0.438	14.5	2020-11-26	MPC · JPL
505P/Palomar	P/2009 KF_{37}	–	5.38	0.317	11.5	2017-09-27	MPC · JPL

39P/Oterma was a quasi-Hilda before a close approach to Jupiter in 1963. 77P/Longmore falls outside of the bulk distribution because of its large eccentricity and inclination. Comet Shoemaker–Levy 9 impacted with Jupiter in 1994.

Unnumbered comets and asteroids claimed to be quasi-Hilda objects (some of which were detected with cometary activity) are the following:

- D/1977 C1 (Skiff–Kosai)
- P/1999 XN_{120} (Catalina)
- 2000 AC229
- 2000 CA13
- 2001 QG288
- 2004 QR38
- 2004 RP111
- 2005 EC272
- 2005 UK380
- 2008 QZ44
- 2008 SZ283
- 2009 DQ118
- 2009 TC54
- 2009 ES189
- P/2010 H2 (Vales)
- 2010 MK43
- 2011 MX9
- 2011 QQ99
- 2011 UB301
- 2011 UG104
- 2011 US383
- 2011 WD180
- 2014 MZ101
- 2014 OM449
- 2016 CD9
- 2016 NQ77
- 2016 WP51
- 2017 FU158
- 2018 CZ16
- 2018 PE48
- 2019 JB49
- 2019 OE31
- 2020 FV35
- 2020 UO43
- 2020 XH11
- (7458) 1984 DE1
- (18916) 2000 OG_{44}
- (30512) 2001 HO_{8}
- (85490) 1997 SE_{5}
- (254010) 2004 FM_{24}
- (371837) 2007 VM_{318}
- (424570) 2008 FB_{115}
- (431336) 2006 XH_{50}
- (450807) 2007 UC_{9}
- (507119) 2009 SR_{143}
- (508861) 2002 RN_{38}
- (524743) 2003 UR_{267}
- (551740) 2013 JU_{15}
- (577805) 2013 QR_{90}
- (615767) 2004 CX_{19}
- (623184) 2015 PV_{306}
- (720872) 2002 QD_{151}
- (742036) 2006 XL_{5}
- (761148) 2009 QM_{24}
- (761729) 2010 JB_{184}
- (811953) 2002 UP_{36}
- (843012) 2016 BS_{30}
- (848473) 2004 CV_{50}
- (850809) 2007 RM_{150}
- (868951) 2016 JF_{46}
- (886673) 2021 JF_{52}
- (889085) 2011 DL_{12}
