= P/2010 H2 (Vales) =

Jupiter-family comet

Discovery
- Discovered by: Jan Vales
- Discovery site: Črni Vrh Observatory
- Discovery date: 16 April 2010

Orbital characteristics
- Epoch: 8 May 2010 (JD 2455324.5)
- Observation arc: 141 days (Not observed in 16 years)
- Earliest precovery date: 15 April 2010
- Number of observations: 1,631
- Aphelion: 4.593 AU (2028-Dec-14)
- Perihelion: 3.108 AU
- Semi-major axis: 3.851 AU
- Eccentricity: 0.19291
- Orbital period: 7.556 years
- Inclination: 14.253°
- Longitude of ascending node: 64.309°
- Argument of periapsis: 130.12°
- Mean anomaly: 7.781°
- Last perihelion: 10 March 2025 (unobserved)
- Next perihelion: 19 September 2032
- T_{Jupiter}: 2.988
- Earth MOID: 2.129 AU
- Jupiter MOID: 0.613 AU

Physical characteristics
- Mean radius: 0.25 km (0.16 mi)
- Geometric albedo: 0.04 (assumed)
- Comet total magnitude (M1): 7.0
- Comet nuclear magnitude (M2): 20.6

P/2010 H2 (Vales), is a distant Jupiter-family comet with a 7.5-year orbit around the Sun. Its frequent encounters with Jupiter also classify it as a quasi-Hilda comet. As of 2025, it is the only comet discovered so far by Slovenian astronomer, Jan Vales. It last came to perihelion in March 2025 and will next come to perihelion in September 2032. The comet has not been observed since it was discovered during an outburst from magnitude 20 to magnitude 12 in April 2010. The comet is expected to normally only brighten to magnitude 20 when near perihelion. It will next come to opposition on 27 June 2026. P/2010 H2 (Vales) is part of the Unistellar citizen science tracking project.

== Observational history ==
The comet underwent a massive outburst when it was discovered by Jan Vales on 16 April 2010. No prediscovery observations earlier than 15 April 2010 were found. Later analysis of data from the Catalina Sky Survey indicated that the outburst may have been ongoing for 15 hours at the time, resulting in its brightness increased by a thousand-fold.

Observations conducted on the day after discovery noted that its coma had undergone a significant increase in size, from 24–26 arcseconds to 34–38 arcseconds across.

Although calculated to have a relatively short orbital period, it was not recovered during its next apparition in 2017. On 17 March 2023, Toni Scarmato reported the observation of an object close to the predicted position of P/2010 H2, indicating a possible recovery of the comet. Further analysis in 2024 did not match the position of the initial reports, concluding that Scarmato's find is likely a different object.

Further search attempts in 2015 and 2025 from the 4.3-meter Lowell Discovery Telescope failed to recover the comet, indicating a possible absolute nuclear magnitude fainter than 20.6, and a nucleus smaller than 0.5 km (0.31 mi) in diameter assuming a geometric albedo of 0.04. However it is still likely that it may have become inactive after the 2010 outburst instead of simply disintegrating.
