= 74P/Smirnova–Chernykh =

Encke-type comet

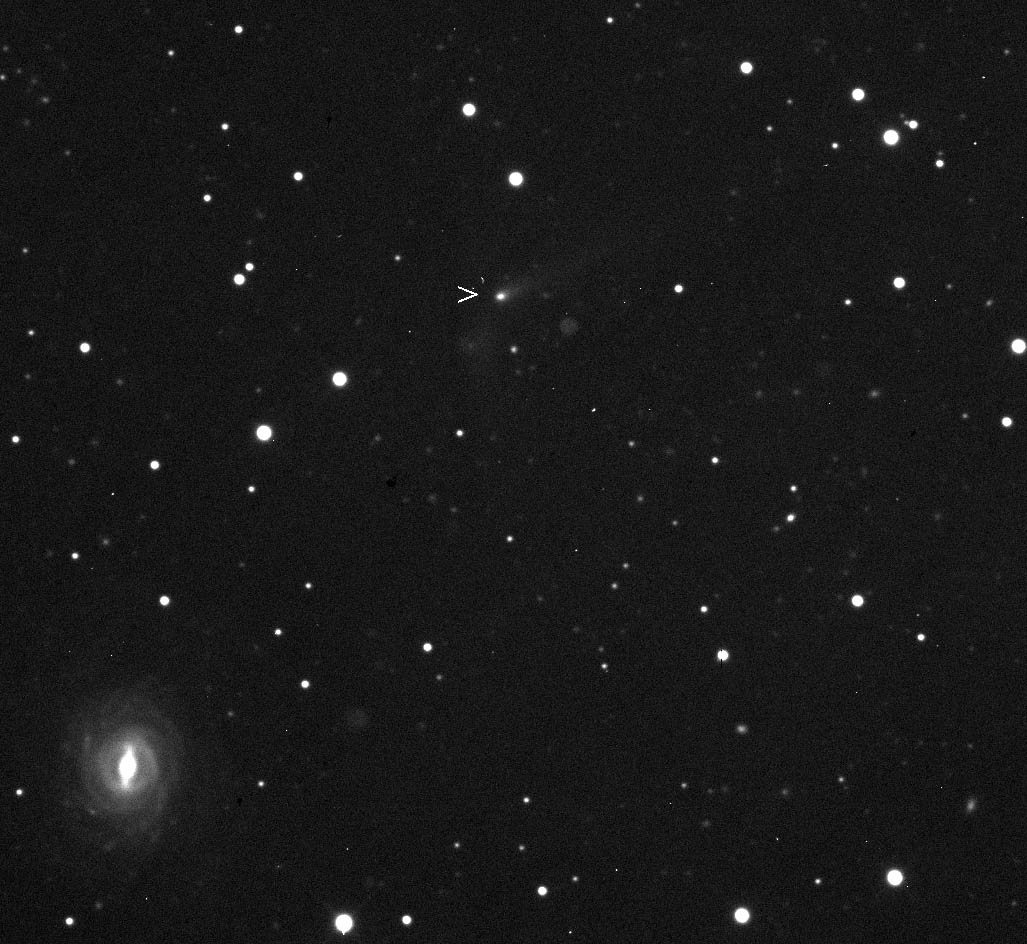
- Comet Smirnova–Chernykh near galaxy PGC 49413 on 25 January 2010

Discovery
- Discovered by: Tamara M. Smirnova; Nikolai S. Chernykh
- Discovery site: Crimean Astrophysical Observatory
- Discovery date: 4 March 1975

Designations
- MPC designation: P/1967 EU, P/1975 E2
- Alternative designations: 1967 XV, 1975 VII; 1984 V, 1992 XXI

Orbital characteristics
- Epoch: 21 November 2025 (JD 2461000.5)
- Observation arc: 58.95 years
- Earliest precovery date: 9 March 1967
- Number of observations: 6,540
- Aphelion: 5.391 AU
- Perihelion: 4.836 AU
- Semi-major axis: 5.114 AU
- Eccentricity: 0.05432
- Orbital period: 11.56 years
- Inclination: 6.015°
- Longitude of ascending node: 51.724°
- Argument of periapsis: 59.702°
- Mean anomaly: 348.44°
- Last perihelion: 2 March 2026
- Next perihelion: 14 June 2034
- T_{Jupiter}: 3.007
- Earth MOID: 2.567 AU
- Jupiter MOID: 0.479 AU

Physical characteristics
- Mean radius: 2.23 km (1.39 mi)
- Comet total magnitude (M1): 6.7
- Comet nuclear magnitude (M2): 12.1

Perihelion distance at different epochs
Epoch	Perihelion (AU)
1929	5.68
1967	3.55
2026	4.84
2034	3.84

74P/Smirnova–Chernykh is an Encke-type comet with a 5:7 orbital resonance with Jupiter. It is also classified as a quasi-Hilda comet. It was discovered in late March 1975 by Tamara Mikhaylovna Smirnova while examining exposures from the Crimean Astrophysical Observatory. In the discovery images the comet had an apparent magnitude of ~15. In the year of discovery, the comet came to perihelion on 6 August 1975.

The comet had been photographed during 1967, but was identified as an asteroid and assigned the designation 1967 EU.

The comet is estimated at 4.46 km (2.77 mi) in diameter.

A close approach to Jupiter in 2021 lifted perihelion from 3.54 AU to 4.84 AU.

== See also ==
- 101P/Chernykh

Numbered comets
Previous; 73P/Schwassmann–Wachmann	74P/Smirnova–Chernykh	Next; 75D/Kohoutek
