= 246P/NEAT =

Jupiter-family comet

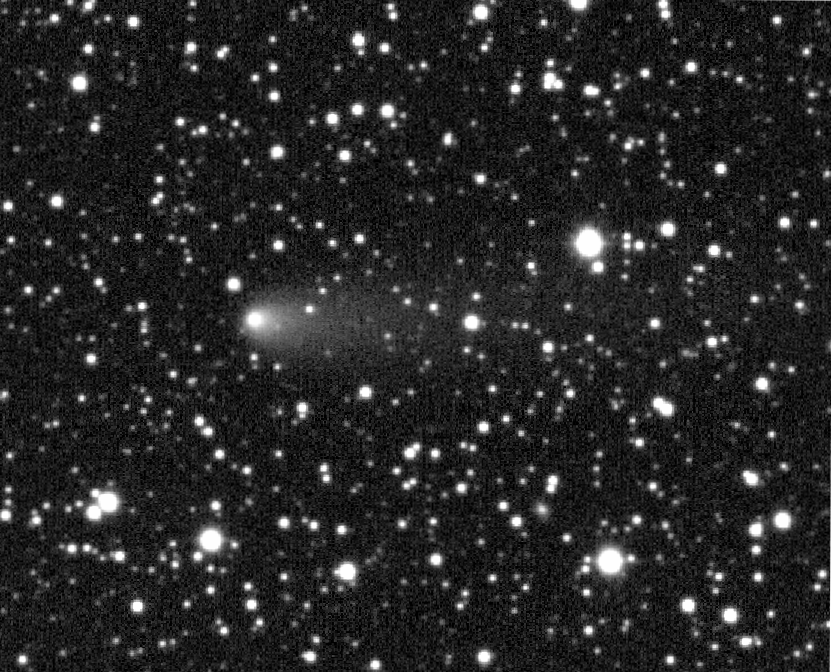
- 246P/NEAT as imaged by the Zwicky Transient Facility on 8 June 2021

Discovery
- Discovered by: Near-Earth Asteroid Tracking (NEAT)
- Discovery site: Haleakalā Observatory
- Discovery date: 28 March 2004

Designations
- MPC designation: P/2004 F3, P/2010 V2
- Alternative designations: NEAT 20

Orbital characteristics
- Epoch: 17 October 2024 (JD 2460600.5)
- Observation arc: 22.92 years (Note: Observation arc from the Minor Planet Center database covering dates from 6 January 2002 until 7 December 2024.)
- Earliest precovery date: 6 January 2002
- Number of observations: 5,007
- Aphelion: 5.245 AU
- Perihelion: 3.164 AU
- Semi-major axis: 4.204 AU
- Eccentricity: 0.28504
- Orbital period: 8.62 years
- Inclination: 17.751°
- Longitude of ascending node: 74.231°
- Argument of periapsis: 185.43°
- Mean anomaly: 156.59°
- Last perihelion: 16 February 2021
- Next perihelion: 28 October 2029
- T_{Jupiter}: 2.913
- Earth MOID: 1.865 AU
- Jupiter MOID: 0.096 AU

Physical characteristics
- Mean radius: 1.01 km (0.63 mi)
- Mean density: 490±80 kg/m^{3}
- Comet total magnitude (M1): 5.9
- Comet nuclear magnitude (M2): 11.3

246P/NEAT is a Jupiter-family comet discovered on 28 March 2004 by the Near-Earth Asteroid Tracking (NEAT) survey using the 1.2 m (47 in) reflector at the Haleakalā Observatory. It was given the permanent number 246P on 14 January 2011.

== Orbit ==
It is classified as a Quasi-Hilda comet. Due to perturbations by Jupiter, the 2005, 2013 and 2021 perihelion passages will be closer to the Sun. The comet is observable all through its orbit.

== Notes ==
Numbered comets
Previous; 245P/WISE	246P/NEAT	Next; 247P/LINEAR
