= List of minor planets: 848001–849000 =

The following is a partial list of minor planets, running from minor-planet number 848001 through 849000, inclusive. The primary data for this and other partial lists is based on JPL's "Small-Body Orbital Elements" and data available from the Minor Planet Center. Critical list information is also provided by the MPC, unless otherwise specified from Lowell Observatory. A detailed description of the table's columns and additional sources are given on the main page including a complete list of every page in this series, and a statistical break-up on the dynamical classification of minor planets.

Also see the summary list of all named bodies in numerical and alphabetical order, and the corresponding naming citations for the number range of this particular list. New namings may only be added to this list after official publication, as the preannouncement of names is condemned by the Working Group for Small Bodies Nomenclature of the International Astronomical Union.

Near-Earth obj.	MBA (inner)	MBA (outer)	Centaur
Mars-crosser	MBA (middle)	Jupiter trojan	Trans-Neptunian obj.
Unclassified

== 848001–848100 ==
Designation			Discovery			Properties		Ref
Permanent	Provisional	Named after	Date	Site	Discoverer(s)	Category	Diam.	Ref
848001	2002 TX_{106}	—	October 2, 2002	Socorro	LINEAR	·	840 m	MPC · JPL
848002	2002 TS_{112}	—	October 3, 2002	Socorro	LINEAR	LIX	2.4 km	MPC · JPL
848003	2002 TB_{126}	—	October 4, 2002	Palomar	NEAT	·	1.6 km	MPC · JPL
848004	2002 TU_{130}	—	September 12, 2002	Palomar	NEAT	·	1.3 km	MPC · JPL
848005	2002 TC_{150}	—	October 5, 2002	Palomar	NEAT	·	1.6 km	MPC · JPL
848006	2002 TF_{150}	—	September 29, 2002	Emerald Lane	L. Ball	·	680 m	MPC · JPL
848007	2002 TQ_{150}	—	October 5, 2002	Palomar	NEAT	·	460 m	MPC · JPL
848008	2002 TH_{198}	—	October 5, 2002	Palomar	NEAT	·	1.1 km	MPC · JPL
848009	2002 TB_{230}	—	October 9, 2002	Kitt Peak	Spacewatch	·	1.8 km	MPC · JPL
848010	2002 TD_{379}	—	October 5, 2002	Palomar	NEAT	·	860 m	MPC · JPL
848011	2002 TZ_{381}	—	August 18, 2009	Kitt Peak	Spacewatch	·	530 m	MPC · JPL
848012	2002 TQ_{382}	—	October 4, 2002	Campo Imperatore	CINEOS	·	1.0 km	MPC · JPL
848013	2002 TQ_{385}	—	October 27, 2008	Kitt Peak	Spacewatch	T_{j} (2.96)	2.2 km	MPC · JPL
848014	2002 TQ_{390}	—	November 11, 2016	Mount Lemmon	Mount Lemmon Survey	H	500 m	MPC · JPL
848015	2002 TP_{391}	—	October 3, 2002	Palomar	NEAT	·	540 m	MPC · JPL
848016	2002 TP_{392}	—	December 6, 2015	Mount Lemmon	Mount Lemmon Survey	·	1.1 km	MPC · JPL
848017	2002 TY_{392}	—	April 10, 2013	Haleakala	Pan-STARRS 1	·	1.2 km	MPC · JPL
848018	2002 TQ_{393}	—	October 1, 2010	Mount Lemmon	Mount Lemmon Survey	3:2	3.0 km	MPC · JPL
848019	2002 UJ_{2}	—	October 28, 2002	Socorro	LINEAR	T_{j} (2.93)	3.2 km	MPC · JPL
848020	2002 UE_{11}	—	October 28, 2002	Nogales	P. R. Holvorcem, M. Schwartz	·	680 m	MPC · JPL
848021	2002 UP_{12}	—	October 31, 2002	Nogales	P. R. Holvorcem, M. Schwartz	·	920 m	MPC · JPL
848022	2002 UL_{74}	—	October 30, 2002	Palomar	NEAT	·	2.4 km	MPC · JPL
848023	2002 UB_{78}	—	October 31, 2002	Palomar	NEAT	THB	2.0 km	MPC · JPL
848024	2002 UC_{80}	—	November 2, 2002	Bro	Uppsala-DLR Asteroid Survey	·	640 m	MPC · JPL
848025	2002 UU_{80}	—	May 2, 2014	Mount Lemmon	Mount Lemmon Survey	·	1.3 km	MPC · JPL
848026	2002 VU_{1}	—	November 2, 2002	Roque de los Muchachos	A. Fitzsimmons	·	770 m	MPC · JPL
848027	2002 VV_{40}	—	November 1, 2002	Palomar	NEAT	·	1.5 km	MPC · JPL
848028	2002 VG_{98}	—	November 11, 2002	Kitt Peak	Spacewatch	·	360 m	MPC · JPL
848029	2002 VH_{116}	—	November 12, 2002	Socorro	LINEAR	·	1.6 km	MPC · JPL
848030	2002 VJ_{123}	—	November 13, 2002	Palomar	NEAT	·	1.4 km	MPC · JPL
848031	2002 VA_{129}	—	November 5, 2002	Socorro	LINEAR	·	2.3 km	MPC · JPL
848032	2002 VX_{144}	—	November 4, 2002	Palomar Mountain	NEAT	THB	2.2 km	MPC · JPL
848033	2002 VJ_{146}	—	November 4, 2002	Palomar	NEAT	·	380 m	MPC · JPL
848034	2002 VL_{147}	—	November 3, 2002	Palomar Mountain	NEAT	·	1.6 km	MPC · JPL
848035	2002 VM_{151}	—	May 8, 2014	Haleakala	Pan-STARRS 1	·	490 m	MPC · JPL
848036	2002 VV_{151}	—	December 9, 2015	Haleakala	Pan-STARRS 1	(5)	870 m	MPC · JPL
848037	2002 VA_{153}	—	April 4, 2014	Haleakala	Pan-STARRS 1	·	1.5 km	MPC · JPL
848038	2002 VO_{153}	—	November 2, 2016	Mount Lemmon	Mount Lemmon Survey	AGN	930 m	MPC · JPL
848039	2002 WW_{20}	—	November 24, 2002	Palomar Mountain	NEAT	(194)	1.4 km	MPC · JPL
848040	2002 WQ_{23}	—	November 24, 2002	Palomar Mountain	NEAT	·	1.0 km	MPC · JPL
848041	2002 WD_{33}	—	November 16, 2002	Palomar	NEAT	·	2.1 km	MPC · JPL
848042	2002 XO_{12}	—	December 3, 2002	Palomar	NEAT	·	820 m	MPC · JPL
848043	2002 XG_{36}	—	December 5, 2002	Socorro	LINEAR	T_{j} (2.9)	1.8 km	MPC · JPL
848044	2002 XA_{102}	—	December 5, 2002	Socorro	LINEAR	(1547)	1.2 km	MPC · JPL
848045	2002 XX_{122}	—	July 4, 2016	Haleakala	Pan-STARRS 1	3:2	4.1 km	MPC · JPL
848046	2002 XE_{124}	—	September 9, 2015	Haleakala	Pan-STARRS 1	·	1.2 km	MPC · JPL
848047	2002 XK_{124}	—	January 16, 2018	Haleakala	Pan-STARRS 1	L5	6.3 km	MPC · JPL
848048	2002 XT_{124}	—	October 24, 2013	Kitt Peak	Spacewatch	·	690 m	MPC · JPL
848049	2002 YB_{4}	—	December 31, 2002	Whipple	Smalley, K., T. B. Spahr	H	290 m	MPC · JPL
848050	2003 AO_{95}	—	November 3, 2007	Mount Lemmon	Mount Lemmon Survey	·	1.9 km	MPC · JPL
848051	2003 BL	—	January 17, 2003	Anderson Mesa	LONEOS	T_{j} (2.54)	2.2 km	MPC · JPL
848052	2003 BY_{6}	—	January 25, 2003	Anderson Mesa	LONEOS	PHO	850 m	MPC · JPL
848053	2003 BV_{96}	—	April 4, 2011	Catalina	CSS	·	970 m	MPC · JPL
848054	2003 BU_{98}	—	February 5, 2011	Haleakala	Pan-STARRS 1	H	300 m	MPC · JPL
848055	2003 CV_{17}	—	February 7, 2003	Palomar	NEAT	·	510 m	MPC · JPL
848056	2003 CJ_{28}	—	November 2, 2007	Kitt Peak	Spacewatch	·	2.0 km	MPC · JPL
848057	2003 CO_{28}	—	February 9, 2003	Kitt Peak	Spacewatch	·	700 m	MPC · JPL
848058	2003 EE_{65}	—	March 10, 2003	Palomar	NEAT	·	930 m	MPC · JPL
848059	2003 FL_{1}	—	March 23, 2003	Palomar	NEAT	PHO	970 m	MPC · JPL
848060	2003 FO_{3}	—	March 24, 2003	Palomar	NEAT	·	670 m	MPC · JPL
848061	2003 FP_{125}	—	March 30, 2003	Kitt Peak	Deep Ecliptic Survey	·	460 m	MPC · JPL
848062	2003 FZ_{132}	—	March 24, 2003	Kitt Peak	Spacewatch	·	2.6 km	MPC · JPL
848063	2003 FK_{139}	—	March 31, 2003	Kitt Peak	Spacewatch	·	1.5 km	MPC · JPL
848064	2003 FJ_{140}	—	March 24, 2003	Kitt Peak	Spacewatch	·	1.6 km	MPC · JPL
848065	2003 FA_{141}	—	March 31, 2003	Kitt Peak	Spacewatch	·	570 m	MPC · JPL
848066	2003 GA_{14}	—	April 4, 2003	Kitt Peak	Spacewatch	H	390 m	MPC · JPL
848067	2003 GJ_{17}	—	April 3, 2003	Anderson Mesa	LONEOS	·	1.3 km	MPC · JPL
848068	2003 GG_{31}	—	April 8, 2003	Kitt Peak	Spacewatch	·	1.7 km	MPC · JPL
848069	2003 GF_{61}	—	April 7, 2003	Kitt Peak	Spacewatch	·	1.5 km	MPC · JPL
848070	2003 GM_{65}	—	October 6, 2008	Mount Lemmon	Mount Lemmon Survey	·	490 m	MPC · JPL
848071	2003 GG_{66}	—	April 7, 2003	Kitt Peak	Spacewatch	NYS	670 m	MPC · JPL
848072	2003 HZ	—	March 9, 2003	Socorro	LINEAR	·	1.4 km	MPC · JPL
848073	2003 HB_{11}	—	April 25, 2003	Kitt Peak	Spacewatch	EUN	680 m	MPC · JPL
848074	2003 HN_{34}	—	April 29, 2003	Kitt Peak	Spacewatch	NYS	860 m	MPC · JPL
848075	2003 HT_{61}	—	May 1, 2014	Mount Lemmon	Mount Lemmon Survey	·	770 m	MPC · JPL
848076	2003 HO_{62}	—	April 25, 2003	Kitt Peak	Spacewatch	·	840 m	MPC · JPL
848077	2003 HT_{62}	—	April 1, 2014	Mount Lemmon	Mount Lemmon Survey	NYS	770 m	MPC · JPL
848078	2003 HA_{64}	—	August 12, 2016	Haleakala	Pan-STARRS 1	·	590 m	MPC · JPL
848079	2003 HM_{65}	—	February 16, 2013	Mount Lemmon	Mount Lemmon Survey	·	530 m	MPC · JPL
848080	2003 HN_{65}	—	April 6, 2008	Kitt Peak	Spacewatch	·	1.2 km	MPC · JPL
848081	2003 JR_{19}	—	March 2, 2016	Haleakala	Pan-STARRS 1	H	360 m	MPC · JPL
848082	2003 JJ_{20}	—	March 21, 2017	Haleakala	Pan-STARRS 1	·	1.5 km	MPC · JPL
848083	2003 JP_{20}	—	April 4, 2011	Kitt Peak	Spacewatch	·	730 m	MPC · JPL
848084	2003 JQ_{20}	—	May 1, 2003	Kitt Peak	Spacewatch	·	1.0 km	MPC · JPL
848085	2003 KK_{2}	—	May 22, 2003	Kitt Peak	Spacewatch	·	1.2 km	MPC · JPL
848086	2003 KB_{3}	—	May 22, 2003	Kitt Peak	Spacewatch	·	1.5 km	MPC · JPL
848087	2003 KN_{6}	—	May 25, 2003	Kitt Peak	Spacewatch	·	820 m	MPC · JPL
848088	2003 KO_{23}	—	May 30, 2003	Cerro Tololo	Deep Ecliptic Survey	·	1.8 km	MPC · JPL
848089	2003 KB_{39}	—	October 21, 2016	Mount Lemmon	Mount Lemmon Survey	·	690 m	MPC · JPL
848090	2003 KF_{39}	—	October 26, 2011	Haleakala	Pan-STARRS 1	·	850 m	MPC · JPL
848091	2003 KG_{39}	—	April 7, 2017	Mount Lemmon	Mount Lemmon Survey	H	400 m	MPC · JPL
848092	2003 KK_{39}	—	October 13, 2007	Kitt Peak	Spacewatch	·	520 m	MPC · JPL
848093	2003 KT_{39}	—	October 29, 2017	Haleakala	Pan-STARRS 1	·	1.7 km	MPC · JPL
848094	2003 KX_{39}	—	April 5, 2016	Haleakala	Pan-STARRS 1	·	470 m	MPC · JPL
848095	2003 KM_{40}	—	May 22, 2003	Kitt Peak	Spacewatch	·	960 m	MPC · JPL
848096	2003 KQ_{40}	—	May 25, 2003	Kitt Peak	Spacewatch	JUN	610 m	MPC · JPL
848097	2003 KS_{40}	—	May 29, 2003	Kitt Peak	Spacewatch	JUN	700 m	MPC · JPL
848098	2003 LW_{10}	—	August 20, 2014	Haleakala	Pan-STARRS 1	·	1.3 km	MPC · JPL
848099	2003 NZ_{14}	—	March 10, 2018	Haleakala	Pan-STARRS 1	·	1.8 km	MPC · JPL
848100	2003 OE_{19}	—	July 30, 2003	Palomar	NEAT	·	2.2 km	MPC · JPL

== 848101–848200 ==
back to top

Designation			Discovery			Properties		Ref
Permanent	Provisional	Named after	Date	Site	Discoverer(s)	Category	Diam.	Ref
848101	2003 OD_{25}	—	July 25, 2003	Palomar	NEAT	·	1.6 km	MPC · JPL
848102	2003 OZ_{34}	—	July 6, 2014	Haleakala	Pan-STARRS 1	·	700 m	MPC · JPL
848103	2003 OC_{35}	—	October 28, 2013	Mount Lemmon	Mount Lemmon Survey	·	1.7 km	MPC · JPL
848104	2003 PU_{13}	—	August 4, 2003	Kitt Peak	Spacewatch	·	870 m	MPC · JPL
848105	2003 QV_{28}	—	August 22, 2003	Campo Imperatore	CINEOS	·	1.2 km	MPC · JPL
848106	2003 QC_{34}	—	August 22, 2003	Palomar	NEAT	·	1.2 km	MPC · JPL
848107	2003 QC_{81}	—	August 23, 2003	Cerro Tololo	Deep Ecliptic Survey	·	1.1 km	MPC · JPL
848108	2003 QE_{82}	—	August 24, 2003	Cerro Tololo	Deep Ecliptic Survey	ERI	960 m	MPC · JPL
848109	2003 QH_{86}	—	August 25, 2003	Cerro Tololo	Deep Ecliptic Survey	·	480 m	MPC · JPL
848110	2003 QN_{96}	—	August 28, 2003	Palomar	NEAT	NYS	860 m	MPC · JPL
848111	2003 QK_{100}	—	August 20, 2003	Campo Imperatore	CINEOS	·	1.3 km	MPC · JPL
848112	2003 QS_{115}	—	August 21, 2003	Mauna Kea	D. D. Balam, K. M. Perrett	·	1.7 km	MPC · JPL
848113	2003 QV_{116}	—	August 29, 2003	Mauna Kea	D. D. Balam	·	610 m	MPC · JPL
848114	2003 QX_{116}	—	August 29, 2003	Mauna Kea	D. D. Balam	·	810 m	MPC · JPL
848115	2003 QR_{118}	—	August 26, 2003	Cerro Tololo	Deep Ecliptic Survey	·	770 m	MPC · JPL
848116	2003 QG_{122}	—	August 25, 2003	Palomar	NEAT	·	1.8 km	MPC · JPL
848117	2003 QJ_{123}	—	October 18, 2012	Haleakala	Pan-STARRS 1	(5)	780 m	MPC · JPL
848118	2003 QB_{124}	—	February 24, 2017	Haleakala	Pan-STARRS 1	EOS	1.4 km	MPC · JPL
848119	2003 QC_{124}	—	April 19, 2013	Haleakala	Pan-STARRS 1	·	490 m	MPC · JPL
848120	2003 QO_{125}	—	August 26, 2003	Cerro Tololo	Deep Ecliptic Survey	·	1.1 km	MPC · JPL
848121	2003 QS_{125}	—	March 4, 2006	Mount Lemmon	Mount Lemmon Survey	·	670 m	MPC · JPL
848122	2003 QJ_{126}	—	August 26, 2003	Cerro Tololo	Deep Ecliptic Survey	·	1.2 km	MPC · JPL
848123	2003 QP_{126}	—	August 24, 2003	Cerro Tololo	Deep Ecliptic Survey	KOR	820 m	MPC · JPL
848124	2003 RX_{28}	—	September 4, 2003	Kitt Peak	Spacewatch	·	800 m	MPC · JPL
848125	2003 SF	—	September 16, 2003	Socorro	LINEAR	APO	370 m	MPC · JPL
848126	2003 SZ	—	September 16, 2003	Kitt Peak	Spacewatch	·	490 m	MPC · JPL
848127	2003 SE_{7}	—	September 17, 2003	Kitt Peak	Spacewatch	·	520 m	MPC · JPL
848128	2003 SN_{9}	—	September 17, 2003	Kitt Peak	Spacewatch	·	1.4 km	MPC · JPL
848129	2003 SU_{19}	—	September 16, 2003	Kitt Peak	Spacewatch	·	570 m	MPC · JPL
848130	2003 SM_{21}	—	September 16, 2003	Kitt Peak	Spacewatch	·	950 m	MPC · JPL
848131	2003 SX_{24}	—	September 17, 2003	Kitt Peak	Spacewatch	·	950 m	MPC · JPL
848132	2003 SB_{32}	—	September 16, 2003	Palomar	NEAT	·	420 m	MPC · JPL
848133	2003 SR_{62}	—	September 17, 2003	Kitt Peak	Spacewatch	EOS	1.2 km	MPC · JPL
848134	2003 SS_{62}	—	September 17, 2003	Kitt Peak	Spacewatch	·	1.6 km	MPC · JPL
848135	2003 SA_{69}	—	September 17, 2003	Kitt Peak	Spacewatch	CLO	1.6 km	MPC · JPL
848136	2003 SB_{75}	—	September 18, 2003	Kitt Peak	Spacewatch	·	1.1 km	MPC · JPL
848137	2003 SR_{78}	—	September 19, 2003	Kitt Peak	Spacewatch	·	870 m	MPC · JPL
848138	2003 SY_{80}	—	September 19, 2003	Kitt Peak	Spacewatch	MAS	480 m	MPC · JPL
848139	2003 SX_{84}	—	September 20, 2003	Haleakala	NEAT	·	1.1 km	MPC · JPL
848140	2003 SO_{112}	—	September 16, 2003	Kitt Peak	Spacewatch	·	760 m	MPC · JPL
848141	2003 SO_{115}	—	September 16, 2003	Kitt Peak	Spacewatch	(1547)	1.1 km	MPC · JPL
848142	2003 SM_{118}	—	September 16, 2003	Kitt Peak	Spacewatch	·	780 m	MPC · JPL
848143	2003 SQ_{124}	—	September 18, 2003	Kitt Peak	Spacewatch	·	730 m	MPC · JPL
848144	2003 SA_{138}	—	September 19, 2003	Campo Imperatore	CINEOS	JUN	730 m	MPC · JPL
848145	2003 SJ_{158}	—	September 20, 2003	Anderson Mesa	LONEOS	·	2.5 km	MPC · JPL
848146	2003 SY_{165}	—	September 20, 2003	Anderson Mesa	LONEOS	(5)	690 m	MPC · JPL
848147	2003 SK_{187}	—	September 23, 2003	Palomar	NEAT	·	880 m	MPC · JPL
848148	2003 SK_{202}	—	September 18, 2003	Kitt Peak	Spacewatch	NYS	780 m	MPC · JPL
848149	2003 SP_{236}	—	September 18, 2003	Kitt Peak	Spacewatch	T_{j} (2.98) · SHU	4.4 km	MPC · JPL
848150	2003 SG_{240}	—	September 27, 2003	Kitt Peak	Spacewatch	·	2.3 km	MPC · JPL
848151	2003 SS_{242}	—	September 27, 2003	Kitt Peak	Spacewatch	THM	1.7 km	MPC · JPL
848152	2003 SZ_{242}	—	September 27, 2003	Kitt Peak	Spacewatch	·	1.1 km	MPC · JPL
848153	2003 SF_{260}	—	August 25, 2003	Palomar	NEAT	H	450 m	MPC · JPL
848154	2003 SH_{261}	—	September 19, 2003	Socorro	LINEAR	·	930 m	MPC · JPL
848155	2003 SA_{268}	—	September 29, 2003	Kitt Peak	Spacewatch	·	1.3 km	MPC · JPL
848156	2003 SS_{276}	—	September 18, 2003	Kitt Peak	Spacewatch	·	1.1 km	MPC · JPL
848157	2003 SQ_{295}	—	September 20, 2003	Kitt Peak	Spacewatch	·	950 m	MPC · JPL
848158	2003 SS_{318}	—	September 18, 2003	Kitt Peak	Spacewatch	·	1.8 km	MPC · JPL
848159	2003 SY_{323}	—	September 16, 2003	Kitt Peak	Spacewatch	·	1.8 km	MPC · JPL
848160	2003 SF_{325}	—	September 17, 2003	Kitt Peak	Spacewatch	·	890 m	MPC · JPL
848161	2003 SW_{329}	—	September 23, 2003	Palomar	NEAT	·	1.1 km	MPC · JPL
848162	2003 SP_{334}	—	September 26, 2003	Sacramento Peak	SDSS	·	890 m	MPC · JPL
848163	2003 SL_{336}	—	September 27, 2003	Kitt Peak	Spacewatch	·	720 m	MPC · JPL
848164	2003 SL_{338}	—	September 26, 2003	Sacramento Peak	SDSS	·	720 m	MPC · JPL
848165	2003 SD_{347}	—	September 18, 2003	Kitt Peak	Spacewatch	·	1.2 km	MPC · JPL
848166	2003 SS_{349}	—	September 18, 2003	Kitt Peak	Spacewatch	NYS	650 m	MPC · JPL
848167	2003 SP_{360}	—	September 21, 2003	Kitt Peak	Spacewatch	·	1.5 km	MPC · JPL
848168	2003 SV_{361}	—	September 22, 2003	Kitt Peak	Spacewatch	·	670 m	MPC · JPL
848169	2003 SG_{367}	—	September 28, 2003	Kitt Peak	Spacewatch	·	1.1 km	MPC · JPL
848170	2003 SQ_{367}	—	September 26, 2003	Sacramento Peak	SDSS	·	760 m	MPC · JPL
848171	2003 SH_{370}	—	September 27, 2003	Kitt Peak	Spacewatch	EUN	860 m	MPC · JPL
848172	2003 SH_{372}	—	September 29, 2003	Kitt Peak	Spacewatch	·	1.3 km	MPC · JPL
848173	2003 SN_{372}	—	September 29, 2003	Kitt Peak	Spacewatch	·	320 m	MPC · JPL
848174	2003 SW_{372}	—	September 26, 2003	Sacramento Peak	SDSS	·	840 m	MPC · JPL
848175	2003 SH_{373}	—	September 26, 2003	Sacramento Peak	SDSS	·	1.9 km	MPC · JPL
848176	2003 SS_{373}	—	September 18, 2003	Kitt Peak	Spacewatch	THM	1.3 km	MPC · JPL
848177	2003 SF_{378}	—	September 26, 2003	Sacramento Peak	SDSS	AGN	790 m	MPC · JPL
848178	2003 SJ_{378}	—	September 18, 2003	Kitt Peak	Spacewatch	AGN	820 m	MPC · JPL
848179	2003 SP_{380}	—	September 29, 2003	Kitt Peak	Spacewatch	·	2.2 km	MPC · JPL
848180	2003 SX_{380}	—	September 26, 2003	Sacramento Peak	SDSS	·	1.2 km	MPC · JPL
848181	2003 SV_{381}	—	September 26, 2003	Sacramento Peak	SDSS	·	2.2 km	MPC · JPL
848182	2003 SV_{382}	—	September 30, 2003	Kitt Peak	Spacewatch	·	1.1 km	MPC · JPL
848183	2003 SD_{384}	—	September 26, 2003	Sacramento Peak	SDSS	·	480 m	MPC · JPL
848184	2003 SU_{384}	—	May 21, 2015	Haleakala	Pan-STARRS 1	·	420 m	MPC · JPL
848185	2003 SV_{384}	—	September 30, 2003	Kitt Peak	Spacewatch	·	650 m	MPC · JPL
848186	2003 SQ_{385}	—	September 21, 2003	Kitt Peak	Spacewatch	·	710 m	MPC · JPL
848187	2003 SP_{386}	—	September 26, 2003	Sacramento Peak	SDSS	·	1.2 km	MPC · JPL
848188	2003 SX_{387}	—	September 26, 2003	Sacramento Peak	SDSS	·	830 m	MPC · JPL
848189	2003 SY_{387}	—	September 26, 2003	Sacramento Peak	SDSS	·	1.9 km	MPC · JPL
848190	2003 SA_{388}	—	September 26, 2003	Sacramento Peak	SDSS	·	830 m	MPC · JPL
848191	2003 SP_{388}	—	September 26, 2003	Sacramento Peak	SDSS	·	1.7 km	MPC · JPL
848192	2003 SC_{389}	—	September 26, 2003	Sacramento Peak	SDSS	·	970 m	MPC · JPL
848193	2003 SR_{389}	—	September 26, 2003	Sacramento Peak	SDSS	·	1.9 km	MPC · JPL
848194	2003 SP_{390}	—	September 26, 2003	Sacramento Peak	SDSS	NYS	680 m	MPC · JPL
848195	2003 SE_{393}	—	September 26, 2003	Sacramento Peak	SDSS	·	1.1 km	MPC · JPL
848196	2003 SW_{393}	—	September 26, 2003	Sacramento Peak	SDSS	·	1.4 km	MPC · JPL
848197	2003 SD_{395}	—	September 26, 2003	Sacramento Peak	SDSS	·	2.1 km	MPC · JPL
848198	2003 SD_{396}	—	September 26, 2003	Sacramento Peak	SDSS	EUN	870 m	MPC · JPL
848199	2003 SQ_{397}	—	September 26, 2003	Sacramento Peak	SDSS	·	870 m	MPC · JPL
848200	2003 SA_{398}	—	October 20, 2003	Kitt Peak	Spacewatch	PHO	540 m	MPC · JPL

== 848201–848300 ==
back to top

Designation			Discovery			Properties		Ref
Permanent	Provisional	Named after	Date	Site	Discoverer(s)	Category	Diam.	Ref
848201	2003 SG_{400}	—	September 26, 2003	Sacramento Peak	SDSS	·	1.2 km	MPC · JPL
848202	2003 SW_{400}	—	September 26, 2003	Sacramento Peak	SDSS	·	520 m	MPC · JPL
848203	2003 SY_{402}	—	September 27, 2003	Kitt Peak	Spacewatch	·	740 m	MPC · JPL
848204	2003 SM_{405}	—	September 27, 2003	Sacramento Peak	SDSS	·	1.8 km	MPC · JPL
848205	2003 SA_{410}	—	September 28, 2003	Kitt Peak	Spacewatch	·	1.6 km	MPC · JPL
848206	2003 SS_{410}	—	September 28, 2003	Kitt Peak	Spacewatch	·	1.8 km	MPC · JPL
848207	2003 SP_{412}	—	September 29, 2003	Kitt Peak	Spacewatch	·	980 m	MPC · JPL
848208	2003 SP_{413}	—	September 29, 2003	Kitt Peak	Spacewatch	·	1.8 km	MPC · JPL
848209	2003 SC_{415}	—	September 28, 2003	Sacramento Peak	SDSS	·	1.1 km	MPC · JPL
848210	2003 SQ_{415}	—	September 16, 2003	Kitt Peak	Spacewatch	H	320 m	MPC · JPL
848211	2003 SZ_{415}	—	October 2, 2003	Kitt Peak	Spacewatch	·	2.0 km	MPC · JPL
848212	2003 SF_{417}	—	September 28, 2003	Sacramento Peak	SDSS	·	1.1 km	MPC · JPL
848213	2003 SS_{417}	—	September 28, 2003	Sacramento Peak	SDSS	·	1.9 km	MPC · JPL
848214	2003 SF_{420}	—	September 28, 2003	Sacramento Peak	SDSS	·	1.2 km	MPC · JPL
848215	2003 SY_{420}	—	September 18, 2003	Kitt Peak	Spacewatch	·	800 m	MPC · JPL
848216	2003 SD_{429}	—	September 20, 2003	Kitt Peak	Spacewatch	·	1.3 km	MPC · JPL
848217	2003 SM_{431}	—	October 17, 2014	Mount Lemmon	Mount Lemmon Survey	·	740 m	MPC · JPL
848218	2003 SO_{432}	—	September 18, 2003	Kitt Peak	Spacewatch	·	1.9 km	MPC · JPL
848219	2003 SP_{432}	—	September 19, 2003	Kitt Peak	Spacewatch	EUN	750 m	MPC · JPL
848220	2003 SJ_{433}	—	September 28, 2003	Sacramento Peak	SDSS	·	2.3 km	MPC · JPL
848221	2003 ST_{433}	—	September 29, 2003	Kitt Peak	Spacewatch	·	1.5 km	MPC · JPL
848222	2003 SR_{443}	—	September 16, 2003	Kitt Peak	Spacewatch	·	1.3 km	MPC · JPL
848223	2003 SD_{445}	—	September 30, 2003	Kitt Peak	Spacewatch	·	400 m	MPC · JPL
848224	2003 SK_{445}	—	November 26, 2014	Haleakala	Pan-STARRS 1	NYS	540 m	MPC · JPL
848225	2003 SY_{445}	—	October 24, 2008	Kitt Peak	Spacewatch	AGN	790 m	MPC · JPL
848226	2003 SH_{446}	—	October 9, 2010	Kitt Peak	Spacewatch	·	480 m	MPC · JPL
848227	2003 SK_{446}	—	February 6, 2013	Kitt Peak	Spacewatch	·	750 m	MPC · JPL
848228	2003 SN_{446}	—	February 14, 2005	Kitt Peak	Spacewatch	·	1 km	MPC · JPL
848229	2003 SU_{446}	—	September 28, 2003	Kitt Peak	Spacewatch	MAS	590 m	MPC · JPL
848230	2003 SX_{446}	—	August 30, 2014	Mount Lemmon	Mount Lemmon Survey	H	360 m	MPC · JPL
848231	2003 SC_{447}	—	November 3, 2007	Kitt Peak	Spacewatch	NYS	680 m	MPC · JPL
848232	2003 SA_{449}	—	September 30, 2003	Kitt Peak	Spacewatch	MAS	440 m	MPC · JPL
848233	2003 SG_{452}	—	September 20, 2003	Kitt Peak	Spacewatch	·	440 m	MPC · JPL
848234	2003 SJ_{453}	—	November 22, 2014	Haleakala	Pan-STARRS 1	·	1.4 km	MPC · JPL
848235	2003 SQ_{455}	—	October 20, 2007	Mount Lemmon	Mount Lemmon Survey	NYS	770 m	MPC · JPL
848236	2003 ST_{455}	—	September 28, 2003	Sacramento Peak	SDSS	·	2.1 km	MPC · JPL
848237	2003 SL_{456}	—	September 21, 2003	Kitt Peak	Spacewatch	THM	1.9 km	MPC · JPL
848238	2003 SR_{456}	—	September 21, 2012	Kitt Peak	Spacewatch	·	1.0 km	MPC · JPL
848239	2003 SY_{456}	—	September 18, 2003	Kitt Peak	Spacewatch	·	470 m	MPC · JPL
848240	2003 SR_{458}	—	January 26, 2012	Mount Lemmon	Mount Lemmon Survey	·	2.0 km	MPC · JPL
848241	2003 SV_{458}	—	July 25, 2015	Haleakala	Pan-STARRS 1	·	790 m	MPC · JPL
848242	2003 SA_{459}	—	September 20, 2003	Palomar	NEAT	·	1.8 km	MPC · JPL
848243	2003 SP_{459}	—	September 23, 2014	Mount Lemmon	Mount Lemmon Survey	·	1.8 km	MPC · JPL
848244	2003 SL_{460}	—	September 15, 2014	Mount Lemmon	Mount Lemmon Survey	EOS	1.5 km	MPC · JPL
848245	2003 SE_{461}	—	September 14, 2007	Mount Lemmon	Mount Lemmon Survey	·	880 m	MPC · JPL
848246	2003 SG_{461}	—	January 9, 2013	Mount Lemmon	Mount Lemmon Survey	T_{j} (2.96) · 3:2	4.3 km	MPC · JPL
848247	2003 SB_{462}	—	August 22, 2014	Haleakala	Pan-STARRS 1	THM	1.5 km	MPC · JPL
848248	2003 SD_{462}	—	September 17, 2012	Mount Lemmon	Mount Lemmon Survey	MRX	720 m	MPC · JPL
848249	2003 SY_{462}	—	September 30, 2003	Kitt Peak	Spacewatch	·	1.7 km	MPC · JPL
848250	2003 ST_{463}	—	March 27, 2017	Mount Lemmon	Mount Lemmon Survey	·	2.1 km	MPC · JPL
848251	2003 SV_{463}	—	October 14, 2014	Mount Lemmon	Mount Lemmon Survey	·	1.5 km	MPC · JPL
848252	2003 SD_{464}	—	September 18, 2003	Kitt Peak	Spacewatch	·	780 m	MPC · JPL
848253	2003 SY_{464}	—	September 16, 2003	Kitt Peak	Spacewatch	THM	1.3 km	MPC · JPL
848254	2003 SN_{465}	—	September 22, 2003	Kitt Peak	Spacewatch	·	900 m	MPC · JPL
848255	2003 SP_{468}	—	September 18, 2003	Kitt Peak	Spacewatch	·	780 m	MPC · JPL
848256	2003 SR_{468}	—	September 30, 2003	Kitt Peak	Spacewatch	·	420 m	MPC · JPL
848257	2003 SF_{469}	—	September 30, 2003	Kitt Peak	Spacewatch	·	1.4 km	MPC · JPL
848258	2003 SP_{469}	—	September 19, 2003	Kitt Peak	Spacewatch	RAF	660 m	MPC · JPL
848259	2003 SQ_{469}	—	September 20, 2003	Kitt Peak	Spacewatch	·	960 m	MPC · JPL
848260	2003 SV_{469}	—	September 18, 2003	Kitt Peak	Spacewatch	·	920 m	MPC · JPL
848261	2003 SN_{470}	—	September 17, 2003	Palomar	NEAT	·	1.0 km	MPC · JPL
848262	2003 SG_{471}	—	September 20, 2003	Kitt Peak	Spacewatch	·	600 m	MPC · JPL
848263	2003 SL_{471}	—	September 22, 2003	Kitt Peak	Spacewatch	·	1.3 km	MPC · JPL
848264	2003 SS_{471}	—	September 26, 2003	Sacramento Peak	SDSS	MAS	420 m	MPC · JPL
848265	2003 SE_{472}	—	September 30, 2003	Kitt Peak	Spacewatch	·	520 m	MPC · JPL
848266	2003 SQ_{472}	—	September 17, 2003	Kitt Peak	Spacewatch	·	910 m	MPC · JPL
848267	2003 SS_{477}	—	September 16, 2003	Kitt Peak	Spacewatch	·	930 m	MPC · JPL
848268	2003 TA_{6}	—	September 23, 2003	Palomar	NEAT	·	980 m	MPC · JPL
848269	2003 TA_{24}	—	September 22, 2003	Anderson Mesa	LONEOS	·	1.1 km	MPC · JPL
848270	2003 TN_{27}	—	October 1, 2003	Kitt Peak	Spacewatch	·	1.2 km	MPC · JPL
848271	2003 TY_{29}	—	October 1, 2003	Kitt Peak	Spacewatch	·	1.4 km	MPC · JPL
848272	2003 TA_{30}	—	October 1, 2003	Kitt Peak	Spacewatch	NYS	760 m	MPC · JPL
848273	2003 TH_{34}	—	October 1, 2003	Kitt Peak	Spacewatch	·	1.9 km	MPC · JPL
848274	2003 TL_{44}	—	September 21, 2003	Kitt Peak	Spacewatch	·	1.2 km	MPC · JPL
848275	2003 TQ_{61}	—	September 11, 2010	Kitt Peak	Spacewatch	·	410 m	MPC · JPL
848276	2003 TT_{61}	—	October 10, 2012	Haleakala	Pan-STARRS 1	·	1.6 km	MPC · JPL
848277	2003 TZ_{63}	—	September 19, 2014	Haleakala	Pan-STARRS 1	·	2.1 km	MPC · JPL
848278	2003 TA_{65}	—	October 2, 2003	Kitt Peak	Spacewatch	MAS	470 m	MPC · JPL
848279	2003 TP_{65}	—	October 5, 2003	Kitt Peak	Spacewatch	·	990 m	MPC · JPL
848280	2003 TD_{66}	—	October 1, 2003	Kitt Peak	Spacewatch	·	990 m	MPC · JPL
848281	2003 TE_{66}	—	October 2, 2003	Kitt Peak	Spacewatch	BRG	890 m	MPC · JPL
848282	2003 UM_{6}	—	October 18, 2003	Palomar	NEAT	·	960 m	MPC · JPL
848283	2003 UA_{14}	—	October 2, 2003	Kitt Peak	Spacewatch	H	340 m	MPC · JPL
848284	2003 UT_{17}	—	October 18, 2003	Kitt Peak	Spacewatch	·	1.5 km	MPC · JPL
848285	2003 UU_{18}	—	October 3, 2003	Kitt Peak	Spacewatch	JUN	450 m	MPC · JPL
848286	2003 UA_{32}	—	September 27, 2003	Kitt Peak	Spacewatch	H	360 m	MPC · JPL
848287	2003 UY_{38}	—	September 30, 2003	Kitt Peak	Spacewatch	·	1.7 km	MPC · JPL
848288	2003 UE_{43}	—	September 30, 2003	Kitt Peak	Spacewatch	MAS	490 m	MPC · JPL
848289	2003 UA_{44}	—	September 28, 2003	Kitt Peak	Spacewatch	·	1.2 km	MPC · JPL
848290	2003 UQ_{58}	—	September 20, 2003	Palomar	NEAT	·	1.4 km	MPC · JPL
848291	2003 US_{69}	—	September 21, 2003	Kitt Peak	Spacewatch	MAS	470 m	MPC · JPL
848292	2003 UQ_{73}	—	October 19, 2003	Kitt Peak	Spacewatch	·	1.0 km	MPC · JPL
848293	2003 UL_{84}	—	October 18, 2003	Kitt Peak	Spacewatch	·	1.1 km	MPC · JPL
848294	2003 UE_{85}	—	October 18, 2003	Kitt Peak	Spacewatch	·	640 m	MPC · JPL
848295	2003 UP_{106}	—	October 18, 2003	Palomar	NEAT	·	580 m	MPC · JPL
848296	2003 UT_{121}	—	October 19, 2003	Palomar	NEAT	·	1.1 km	MPC · JPL
848297	2003 UZ_{128}	—	October 21, 2003	Kitt Peak	Spacewatch	·	880 m	MPC · JPL
848298	2003 US_{130}	—	August 28, 2003	Palomar	NEAT	·	1.2 km	MPC · JPL
848299	2003 UD_{169}	—	October 22, 2003	Kitt Peak	Spacewatch	·	760 m	MPC · JPL
848300	2003 UB_{183}	—	October 21, 2003	Palomar	NEAT	·	1.3 km	MPC · JPL

== 848301–848400 ==
back to top

Designation			Discovery			Properties		Ref
Permanent	Provisional	Named after	Date	Site	Discoverer(s)	Category	Diam.	Ref
848301	2003 UR_{203}	—	October 21, 2003	Kitt Peak	Spacewatch	·	1.2 km	MPC · JPL
848302	2003 UK_{205}	—	October 22, 2003	Socorro	LINEAR	·	920 m	MPC · JPL
848303	2003 UV_{231}	—	October 24, 2003	Kitt Peak	Spacewatch	·	390 m	MPC · JPL
848304	2003 UD_{254}	—	October 19, 2003	Kitt Peak	Spacewatch	MAS	510 m	MPC · JPL
848305	2003 UX_{262}	—	October 3, 2003	Kitt Peak	Spacewatch	·	1.5 km	MPC · JPL
848306	2003 UT_{279}	—	September 20, 2003	Palomar	NEAT	(32418)	1.7 km	MPC · JPL
848307	2003 UM_{281}	—	October 18, 2003	Anderson Mesa	LONEOS	·	1.3 km	MPC · JPL
848308	2003 UV_{281}	—	October 29, 2003	Kitt Peak	Deep Lens Survey	·	1.7 km	MPC · JPL
848309	2003 UX_{284}	—	September 27, 2003	Kitt Peak	Spacewatch	·	1.0 km	MPC · JPL
848310	2003 UE_{300}	—	September 27, 2003	Kitt Peak	Spacewatch	NYS	710 m	MPC · JPL
848311	2003 UV_{303}	—	October 17, 2003	Kitt Peak	Spacewatch	·	1.4 km	MPC · JPL
848312	2003 UB_{305}	—	October 18, 2003	Kitt Peak	Spacewatch	·	700 m	MPC · JPL
848313	2003 UM_{305}	—	October 1, 2003	Kitt Peak	Spacewatch	·	480 m	MPC · JPL
848314	2003 UO_{310}	—	October 4, 2003	Kitt Peak	Spacewatch	·	610 m	MPC · JPL
848315	2003 UT_{321}	—	October 16, 2003	Kitt Peak	Spacewatch	·	1.8 km	MPC · JPL
848316	2003 UW_{321}	—	October 16, 2003	Kitt Peak	Spacewatch	·	560 m	MPC · JPL
848317	2003 UB_{330}	—	October 3, 2003	Kitt Peak	Spacewatch	·	1.1 km	MPC · JPL
848318	2003 UA_{336}	—	October 18, 2003	Sacramento Peak	SDSS	·	970 m	MPC · JPL
848319	2003 UX_{338}	—	October 18, 2003	Kitt Peak	Spacewatch	·	1.3 km	MPC · JPL
848320	2003 UE_{339}	—	October 18, 2003	Kitt Peak	Spacewatch	·	410 m	MPC · JPL
848321	2003 UH_{340}	—	September 18, 2003	Kitt Peak	Spacewatch	NYS	720 m	MPC · JPL
848322	2003 UC_{341}	—	August 23, 2003	Campo Imperatore	CINEOS	·	960 m	MPC · JPL
848323	2003 UM_{344}	—	October 19, 2003	Sacramento Peak	SDSS	·	830 m	MPC · JPL
848324	2003 UL_{347}	—	September 20, 2003	Kitt Peak	Spacewatch	·	2.2 km	MPC · JPL
848325	2003 UN_{347}	—	October 19, 2003	Sacramento Peak	SDSS	·	2.1 km	MPC · JPL
848326	2003 UG_{348}	—	October 19, 2003	Sacramento Peak	SDSS	MAS	530 m	MPC · JPL
848327	2003 UQ_{356}	—	October 19, 2003	Kitt Peak	Spacewatch	MAR	710 m	MPC · JPL
848328	2003 UM_{358}	—	September 28, 2003	Kitt Peak	Spacewatch	TIR	1.8 km	MPC · JPL
848329	2003 UW_{359}	—	October 19, 2003	Kitt Peak	Spacewatch	·	1.5 km	MPC · JPL
848330	2003 UF_{363}	—	October 20, 2003	Kitt Peak	Spacewatch	·	910 m	MPC · JPL
848331	2003 UQ_{364}	—	October 20, 2003	Kitt Peak	Spacewatch	·	1.7 km	MPC · JPL
848332	2003 UN_{365}	—	October 20, 2003	Kitt Peak	Spacewatch	·	960 m	MPC · JPL
848333	2003 UW_{366}	—	October 20, 2003	Kitt Peak	Spacewatch	EOS	1.3 km	MPC · JPL
848334	2003 UE_{379}	—	September 27, 2003	Kitt Peak	Spacewatch	·	1.5 km	MPC · JPL
848335	2003 UR_{379}	—	October 22, 2003	Sacramento Peak	SDSS	EOS	1.2 km	MPC · JPL
848336	2003 US_{379}	—	September 21, 2003	Kitt Peak	Spacewatch	·	680 m	MPC · JPL
848337	2003 UX_{382}	—	October 22, 2003	Sacramento Peak	SDSS	(5)	740 m	MPC · JPL
848338	2003 UC_{384}	—	October 22, 2003	Sacramento Peak	SDSS	·	2.1 km	MPC · JPL
848339	2003 UX_{385}	—	October 22, 2003	Sacramento Peak	SDSS	·	1.3 km	MPC · JPL
848340	2003 UZ_{388}	—	October 22, 2003	Sacramento Peak	SDSS	V	430 m	MPC · JPL
848341	2003 UT_{389}	—	October 22, 2003	Sacramento Peak	SDSS	·	2.0 km	MPC · JPL
848342	2003 UC_{391}	—	October 22, 2003	Sacramento Peak	SDSS	·	920 m	MPC · JPL
848343	2003 UF_{393}	—	October 22, 2003	Sacramento Peak	SDSS	·	890 m	MPC · JPL
848344	2003 UM_{394}	—	October 22, 2003	Sacramento Peak	SDSS	·	1.1 km	MPC · JPL
848345	2003 UQ_{394}	—	October 22, 2003	Sacramento Peak	SDSS	·	2.1 km	MPC · JPL
848346	2003 UT_{394}	—	October 22, 2003	Sacramento Peak	SDSS	·	1.9 km	MPC · JPL
848347	2003 UZ_{394}	—	October 22, 2003	Sacramento Peak	SDSS	·	1.6 km	MPC · JPL
848348	2003 UR_{398}	—	October 22, 2003	Sacramento Peak	SDSS	JUN	610 m	MPC · JPL
848349	2003 UZ_{402}	—	September 18, 2003	Kitt Peak	Spacewatch	·	640 m	MPC · JPL
848350	2003 UO_{404}	—	October 23, 2003	Sacramento Peak	SDSS	MAS	540 m	MPC · JPL
848351	2003 UN_{405}	—	October 23, 2003	Sacramento Peak	SDSS	·	560 m	MPC · JPL
848352	2003 UU_{405}	—	October 23, 2003	Sacramento Peak	SDSS	·	740 m	MPC · JPL
848353	2003 UC_{407}	—	October 23, 2003	Sacramento Peak	SDSS	·	980 m	MPC · JPL
848354	2003 UC_{408}	—	October 23, 2003	Sacramento Peak	SDSS	·	1.2 km	MPC · JPL
848355	2003 UA_{410}	—	October 23, 2003	Sacramento Peak	SDSS	PHO	600 m	MPC · JPL
848356	2003 UR_{413}	—	October 29, 2003	Kitt Peak	Spacewatch	NYS	910 m	MPC · JPL
848357	2003 UV_{413}	—	October 29, 2003	Kitt Peak	Spacewatch	HYG	1.7 km	MPC · JPL
848358	2003 UO_{416}	—	September 30, 2003	Kitt Peak	Spacewatch	·	1.5 km	MPC · JPL
848359	2003 UC_{419}	—	October 19, 2003	Sacramento Peak	SDSS	·	1.7 km	MPC · JPL
848360	2003 UK_{419}	—	October 21, 2003	Palomar	NEAT	·	1.0 km	MPC · JPL
848361	2003 UE_{422}	—	October 20, 2003	Kitt Peak	Spacewatch	·	1.4 km	MPC · JPL
848362	2003 UW_{423}	—	March 8, 2013	Haleakala	Pan-STARRS 1	NYS	910 m	MPC · JPL
848363	2003 UA_{427}	—	September 14, 2010	La Sagra	OAM	·	720 m	MPC · JPL
848364	2003 UA_{429}	—	February 8, 2008	Mount Lemmon	Mount Lemmon Survey	·	430 m	MPC · JPL
848365	2003 UR_{429}	—	October 18, 2003	Kitt Peak	Spacewatch	·	1.5 km	MPC · JPL
848366	2003 UM_{430}	—	July 27, 2014	Haleakala	Pan-STARRS 1	V	430 m	MPC · JPL
848367	2003 UV_{430}	—	October 29, 2003	Kitt Peak	Spacewatch	·	690 m	MPC · JPL
848368	2003 UW_{430}	—	March 27, 2012	Mount Lemmon	Mount Lemmon Survey	·	2.1 km	MPC · JPL
848369	2003 UX_{430}	—	October 21, 2003	Kitt Peak	Spacewatch	·	790 m	MPC · JPL
848370	2003 UE_{431}	—	October 23, 2003	Kitt Peak	Spacewatch	·	1.4 km	MPC · JPL
848371	2003 UG_{431}	—	February 17, 2013	Kitt Peak	Spacewatch	·	950 m	MPC · JPL
848372	2003 UO_{433}	—	December 11, 2014	Mount Lemmon	Mount Lemmon Survey	·	1.6 km	MPC · JPL
848373	2003 UM_{434}	—	October 3, 2014	Kitt Peak	Spacewatch	·	1.9 km	MPC · JPL
848374	2003 UU_{434}	—	April 26, 2017	Haleakala	Pan-STARRS 1	·	1.1 km	MPC · JPL
848375	2003 UY_{434}	—	October 16, 2003	Kitt Peak	Spacewatch	MAS	540 m	MPC · JPL
848376	2003 UY_{435}	—	October 1, 2014	Haleakala	Pan-STARRS 1	·	830 m	MPC · JPL
848377	2003 UM_{439}	—	September 24, 2008	Mount Lemmon	Mount Lemmon Survey	·	2.2 km	MPC · JPL
848378	2003 US_{439}	—	May 15, 2015	Haleakala	Pan-STARRS 1	·	530 m	MPC · JPL
848379	2003 UU_{440}	—	September 4, 2008	Kitt Peak	Spacewatch	·	1.8 km	MPC · JPL
848380	2003 UM_{441}	—	February 5, 2016	Haleakala	Pan-STARRS 1	EOS	1.4 km	MPC · JPL
848381	2003 UN_{441}	—	February 29, 2016	Haleakala	Pan-STARRS 1	V	420 m	MPC · JPL
848382	2003 UV_{441}	—	August 14, 2015	Haleakala	Pan-STARRS 1	·	710 m	MPC · JPL
848383	2003 UT_{442}	—	October 15, 2014	Mount Lemmon	Mount Lemmon Survey	·	2.1 km	MPC · JPL
848384	2003 UX_{442}	—	August 19, 2006	Anderson Mesa	LONEOS	·	450 m	MPC · JPL
848385	2003 UY_{442}	—	September 26, 2017	Haleakala	Pan-STARRS 1	HOF	1.8 km	MPC · JPL
848386	2003 UQ_{443}	—	August 27, 2014	Haleakala	Pan-STARRS 1	MAS	450 m	MPC · JPL
848387	2003 UR_{443}	—	August 27, 2006	Kitt Peak	Spacewatch	·	530 m	MPC · JPL
848388	2003 UK_{444}	—	October 22, 2003	Kitt Peak	Spacewatch	MAS	500 m	MPC · JPL
848389	2003 UQ_{444}	—	October 19, 2003	Kitt Peak	Spacewatch	ADE	1.2 km	MPC · JPL
848390	2003 UY_{445}	—	October 19, 2003	Kitt Peak	Spacewatch	·	2.2 km	MPC · JPL
848391	2003 UQ_{446}	—	October 20, 2003	Kitt Peak	Spacewatch	·	2.2 km	MPC · JPL
848392	2003 UC_{447}	—	October 16, 2003	Kitt Peak	Spacewatch	·	1.6 km	MPC · JPL
848393	2003 UV_{447}	—	January 16, 2011	Mount Lemmon	Mount Lemmon Survey	·	410 m	MPC · JPL
848394	2003 UC_{448}	—	October 19, 2003	Sacramento Peak	SDSS	(11882)	1.0 km	MPC · JPL
848395	2003 UM_{448}	—	October 25, 2003	Kitt Peak	Spacewatch	DOR	1.8 km	MPC · JPL
848396	2003 UW_{450}	—	October 21, 2003	Kitt Peak	Spacewatch	·	500 m	MPC · JPL
848397	2003 VL_{3}	—	November 15, 2003	Kitt Peak	Spacewatch	·	530 m	MPC · JPL
848398	2003 VY_{6}	—	November 15, 2003	Kitt Peak	Spacewatch	MAS	430 m	MPC · JPL
848399	2003 WN_{2}	—	October 23, 2003	Kitt Peak	Spacewatch	·	2.1 km	MPC · JPL
848400	2003 WW_{7}	—	November 19, 2003	Palomar	NEAT	·	1.1 km	MPC · JPL

== 848401–848500 ==
back to top

Designation			Discovery			Properties		Ref
Permanent	Provisional	Named after	Date	Site	Discoverer(s)	Category	Diam.	Ref
848401	2003 WD_{13}	—	November 19, 2003	Mauna Kea	Pittichová, J., Bedient, J.	·	2.0 km	MPC · JPL
848402	2003 WQ_{41}	—	November 20, 2003	Socorro	LINEAR	·	2.0 km	MPC · JPL
848403	2003 WU_{41}	—	November 20, 2003	Socorro	LINEAR	·	1.0 km	MPC · JPL
848404	2003 WL_{47}	—	November 18, 2003	Kitt Peak	Spacewatch	·	840 m	MPC · JPL
848405	2003 WJ_{48}	—	November 18, 2003	Kitt Peak	Spacewatch	·	860 m	MPC · JPL
848406	2003 WE_{88}	—	October 27, 2003	Kitt Peak	Spacewatch	H	420 m	MPC · JPL
848407	2003 WO_{97}	—	October 20, 2003	Kitt Peak	Spacewatch	·	1.6 km	MPC · JPL
848408	2003 WV_{157}	—	November 30, 2003	Socorro	LINEAR	T_{j} (2.9)	3.6 km	MPC · JPL
848409	2003 WW_{174}	—	October 23, 2003	Kitt Peak	Spacewatch	·	1.1 km	MPC · JPL
848410	2003 WJ_{180}	—	December 1, 2003	Kitt Peak	Spacewatch	THM	1.7 km	MPC · JPL
848411	2003 WH_{185}	—	December 17, 2003	Kitt Peak	Spacewatch	·	1.2 km	MPC · JPL
848412	2003 WE_{186}	—	November 22, 2003	Kitt Peak	Deep Ecliptic Survey	·	1.3 km	MPC · JPL
848413	2003 WE_{187}	—	October 21, 2003	Kitt Peak	Spacewatch	H	310 m	MPC · JPL
848414	2003 WV_{194}	—	November 16, 2003	Sacramento Peak	SDSS	EUN	900 m	MPC · JPL
848415	2003 WV_{195}	—	November 24, 2003	Anderson Mesa	LONEOS	H	360 m	MPC · JPL
848416	2003 WB_{200}	—	October 12, 2010	Mount Lemmon	Mount Lemmon Survey	·	730 m	MPC · JPL
848417	2003 WJ_{200}	—	June 14, 2016	Mount Lemmon	Mount Lemmon Survey	·	590 m	MPC · JPL
848418	2003 WR_{201}	—	November 20, 2003	Kitt Peak	Spacewatch	CLO	1.4 km	MPC · JPL
848419	2003 WW_{202}	—	February 9, 2015	Mount Lemmon	Mount Lemmon Survey	NYS	660 m	MPC · JPL
848420	2003 WL_{203}	—	October 4, 2012	Mount Lemmon	Mount Lemmon Survey	KOR	890 m	MPC · JPL
848421	2003 WR_{203}	—	November 19, 2003	Kitt Peak	Spacewatch	JUN	710 m	MPC · JPL
848422	2003 WS_{203}	—	November 24, 2003	Kitt Peak	Spacewatch	·	1.1 km	MPC · JPL
848423	2003 WJ_{204}	—	November 18, 2003	Kitt Peak	Spacewatch	LIX	2.6 km	MPC · JPL
848424	2003 WG_{205}	—	October 22, 2014	Mount Lemmon	Mount Lemmon Survey	THM	1.7 km	MPC · JPL
848425	2003 WV_{207}	—	November 26, 2003	Kitt Peak	Spacewatch	·	530 m	MPC · JPL
848426	2003 WX_{207}	—	September 16, 2010	Kitt Peak	Spacewatch	·	600 m	MPC · JPL
848427	2003 WY_{208}	—	December 17, 2007	Mount Lemmon	Mount Lemmon Survey	·	870 m	MPC · JPL
848428	2003 WV_{211}	—	September 18, 2014	Haleakala	Pan-STARRS 1	·	2.1 km	MPC · JPL
848429	2003 WX_{212}	—	October 29, 2014	Kitt Peak	Spacewatch	(159)	1.8 km	MPC · JPL
848430	2003 WH_{214}	—	November 26, 2003	Kitt Peak	Spacewatch	·	2.0 km	MPC · JPL
848431	2003 WL_{214}	—	August 10, 2010	Kitt Peak	Spacewatch	MAS	540 m	MPC · JPL
848432	2003 WF_{215}	—	November 19, 2003	Kitt Peak	Spacewatch	·	430 m	MPC · JPL
848433	2003 WJ_{215}	—	November 18, 2003	Palomar	NEAT	·	470 m	MPC · JPL
848434	2003 WP_{215}	—	November 24, 2003	Kitt Peak	Spacewatch	·	500 m	MPC · JPL
848435	2003 WL_{216}	—	November 18, 2003	Kitt Peak	Spacewatch	·	2.2 km	MPC · JPL
848436	2003 WT_{216}	—	November 19, 2003	Kitt Peak	Spacewatch	TIR	1.9 km	MPC · JPL
848437	2003 WB_{217}	—	November 24, 2003	Kitt Peak	Spacewatch	H	360 m	MPC · JPL
848438	2003 WL_{217}	—	November 24, 2003	Kitt Peak	Spacewatch	·	1.5 km	MPC · JPL
848439	2003 WN_{217}	—	November 30, 2003	Kitt Peak	Spacewatch	·	1.3 km	MPC · JPL
848440	2003 WV_{217}	—	November 21, 2003	Kitt Peak	Spacewatch	·	1.3 km	MPC · JPL
848441	2003 WD_{218}	—	November 20, 2003	Kitt Peak	Spacewatch	·	1.0 km	MPC · JPL
848442	2003 WM_{218}	—	November 19, 2003	Kitt Peak	Spacewatch	·	420 m	MPC · JPL
848443	2003 XL_{32}	—	December 1, 2003	Kitt Peak	Spacewatch	·	730 m	MPC · JPL
848444	2003 XA_{46}	—	October 11, 2012	Mount Lemmon	Mount Lemmon Survey	HOF	1.8 km	MPC · JPL
848445	2003 YX_{8}	—	December 20, 2003	Socorro	LINEAR	PHO	590 m	MPC · JPL
848446	2003 YX_{67}	—	November 26, 2003	Kitt Peak	Spacewatch	·	530 m	MPC · JPL
848447	2003 YP_{176}	—	December 16, 2003	Mauna Kea	D. D. Balam	·	1.0 km	MPC · JPL
848448	2003 YN_{178}	—	December 18, 2003	La Silla	F. Hormuth	·	1.1 km	MPC · JPL
848449	2003 YP_{184}	—	December 22, 2003	Kitt Peak	Spacewatch	·	1.4 km	MPC · JPL
848450	2003 YY_{184}	—	January 15, 2011	Mount Lemmon	Mount Lemmon Survey	·	770 m	MPC · JPL
848451	2003 YW_{185}	—	January 3, 2009	Mount Lemmon	Mount Lemmon Survey	·	1.2 km	MPC · JPL
848452	2003 YF_{186}	—	December 1, 2010	Mount Lemmon	Mount Lemmon Survey	·	710 m	MPC · JPL
848453	2003 YR_{187}	—	October 8, 2012	Mount Lemmon	Mount Lemmon Survey	GEF	860 m	MPC · JPL
848454	2003 YB_{188}	—	October 10, 2008	Mount Lemmon	Mount Lemmon Survey	·	2.0 km	MPC · JPL
848455	2003 YZ_{188}	—	December 30, 2007	Kitt Peak	Spacewatch	·	690 m	MPC · JPL
848456	2003 YK_{190}	—	December 29, 2003	Kitt Peak	Spacewatch	·	2.2 km	MPC · JPL
848457	2003 YP_{190}	—	December 28, 2003	Kitt Peak	Spacewatch	·	740 m	MPC · JPL
848458	2004 AR_{27}	—	January 15, 2004	Kitt Peak	Spacewatch	NYS	510 m	MPC · JPL
848459	2004 BN_{10}	—	January 17, 2004	Kitt Peak	Spacewatch	·	1.7 km	MPC · JPL
848460	2004 BT_{38}	—	January 20, 2004	Socorro	LINEAR	·	660 m	MPC · JPL
848461	2004 BP_{68}	—	January 24, 2004	Socorro	LINEAR	H	380 m	MPC · JPL
848462	2004 BJ_{101}	—	January 28, 2004	Kitt Peak	Spacewatch	·	1.1 km	MPC · JPL
848463	2004 BZ_{102}	—	January 31, 2004	Catalina	CSS	H	450 m	MPC · JPL
848464	2004 BF_{125}	—	January 16, 2004	Kitt Peak	Spacewatch	NYS	770 m	MPC · JPL
848465	2004 BT_{168}	—	January 31, 2004	Sacramento Peak	SDSS	·	2.3 km	MPC · JPL
848466	2004 BQ_{170}	—	November 3, 2010	Mount Lemmon	Mount Lemmon Survey	MAS	520 m	MPC · JPL
848467	2004 BC_{171}	—	November 17, 2014	Haleakala	Pan-STARRS 1	PHO	650 m	MPC · JPL
848468	2004 BX_{171}	—	November 26, 2014	Haleakala	Pan-STARRS 1	·	1.9 km	MPC · JPL
848469	2004 BX_{172}	—	November 9, 2008	Kitt Peak	Spacewatch	·	1.9 km	MPC · JPL
848470	2004 BG_{173}	—	January 30, 2004	Kitt Peak	Spacewatch	·	510 m	MPC · JPL
848471	2004 BJ_{173}	—	January 30, 2004	Kitt Peak	Spacewatch	·	510 m	MPC · JPL
848472	2004 CP_{42}	—	February 11, 2004	Kitt Peak	Spacewatch	H	290 m	MPC · JPL
848473	2004 CV_{50}	—	January 23, 2004	Anderson Mesa	LONEOS	·	1.5 km	MPC · JPL
848474	2004 CX_{118}	—	February 11, 2004	Kitt Peak	Spacewatch	MAS	600 m	MPC · JPL
848475	2004 CQ_{132}	—	February 12, 2004	Kitt Peak	Spacewatch	·	960 m	MPC · JPL
848476	2004 CA_{133}	—	April 3, 2008	Kitt Peak	Spacewatch	·	540 m	MPC · JPL
848477	2004 CC_{133}	—	August 31, 2005	Kitt Peak	Spacewatch	NYS	790 m	MPC · JPL
848478	2004 CO_{133}	—	February 12, 2004	Kitt Peak	Spacewatch	3:2 · SHU	4.5 km	MPC · JPL
848479	2004 CG_{135}	—	March 26, 2008	Mount Lemmon	Mount Lemmon Survey	MAS	490 m	MPC · JPL
848480	2004 CD_{136}	—	February 11, 2004	Kitt Peak	Spacewatch	NYS	850 m	MPC · JPL
848481	2004 DX_{61}	—	February 29, 2004	Kitt Peak	Spacewatch	·	1.5 km	MPC · JPL
848482	2004 DQ_{68}	—	February 26, 2004	Kitt Peak	Deep Ecliptic Survey	VER	1.7 km	MPC · JPL
848483	2004 DU_{68}	—	February 26, 2004	Kitt Peak	Deep Ecliptic Survey	·	1.4 km	MPC · JPL
848484	2004 DT_{70}	—	February 26, 2004	Kitt Peak	Deep Ecliptic Survey	·	740 m	MPC · JPL
848485	2004 DS_{73}	—	February 17, 2004	Kitt Peak	Spacewatch	·	1.2 km	MPC · JPL
848486	2004 DV_{83}	—	March 12, 2008	Kitt Peak	Spacewatch	·	730 m	MPC · JPL
848487	2004 DC_{86}	—	September 28, 2008	Mount Lemmon	Mount Lemmon Survey	H	370 m	MPC · JPL
848488	2004 DN_{86}	—	October 12, 2010	Mount Lemmon	Mount Lemmon Survey	·	870 m	MPC · JPL
848489	2004 DQ_{87}	—	October 30, 2010	Mount Lemmon	Mount Lemmon Survey	·	820 m	MPC · JPL
848490	2004 DY_{87}	—	November 28, 2014	Haleakala	Pan-STARRS 1	·	1.9 km	MPC · JPL
848491	2004 DM_{88}	—	August 7, 2016	Haleakala	Pan-STARRS 1	·	1.2 km	MPC · JPL
848492	2004 EK_{9}	—	March 14, 2004	Socorro	LINEAR	·	1.3 km	MPC · JPL
848493	2004 EH_{28}	—	March 15, 2004	Kitt Peak	Spacewatch	·	640 m	MPC · JPL
848494	2004 ES_{47}	—	March 15, 2004	Catalina	CSS	·	500 m	MPC · JPL
848495	2004 EW_{101}	—	March 15, 2004	Kitt Peak	Spacewatch	·	460 m	MPC · JPL
848496	2004 ET_{110}	—	March 15, 2004	Kitt Peak	Spacewatch	·	640 m	MPC · JPL
848497	2004 FC_{4}	—	March 17, 2004	Puimichel	C. Demeautis, D. Matter	T_{j} (2.98) · EUP	2.7 km	MPC · JPL
848498	2004 FT_{16}	—	March 16, 2004	Mauna Kea	D. D. Balam	·	1.7 km	MPC · JPL
848499	2004 FE_{20}	—	March 16, 2004	Socorro	LINEAR	·	1.5 km	MPC · JPL
848500	2004 FO_{72}	—	March 17, 2004	Kitt Peak	Spacewatch	·	1.7 km	MPC · JPL

== 848501–848600 ==
back to top

Designation			Discovery			Properties		Ref
Permanent	Provisional	Named after	Date	Site	Discoverer(s)	Category	Diam.	Ref
848501	2004 FW_{119}	—	March 23, 2004	Kitt Peak	Spacewatch	·	1.4 km	MPC · JPL
848502	2004 FD_{159}	—	March 18, 2004	Kitt Peak	Spacewatch	·	600 m	MPC · JPL
848503	2004 FH_{162}	—	March 18, 2004	Kitt Peak	Spacewatch	·	660 m	MPC · JPL
848504	2004 FS_{170}	—	January 27, 2007	Mount Lemmon	Mount Lemmon Survey	·	420 m	MPC · JPL
848505	2004 FX_{173}	—	February 24, 2015	Haleakala	Pan-STARRS 1	MAS	480 m	MPC · JPL
848506	2004 FQ_{174}	—	October 17, 2010	Mount Lemmon	Mount Lemmon Survey	·	730 m	MPC · JPL
848507	2004 FF_{175}	—	March 16, 2004	Kitt Peak	Spacewatch	·	740 m	MPC · JPL
848508	2004 FS_{176}	—	January 26, 2007	Kitt Peak	Spacewatch	·	430 m	MPC · JPL
848509	2004 FS_{178}	—	March 18, 2004	Kitt Peak	Spacewatch	·	2.6 km	MPC · JPL
848510	2004 GW_{65}	—	April 13, 2004	Kitt Peak	Spacewatch	·	1.0 km	MPC · JPL
848511	2004 GL_{91}	—	November 11, 2016	Mount Lemmon	Mount Lemmon Survey	·	1.6 km	MPC · JPL
848512	2004 GU_{91}	—	February 10, 2018	Mount Lemmon	Mount Lemmon Survey	·	790 m	MPC · JPL
848513	2004 HF_{42}	—	April 20, 2004	Kitt Peak	Spacewatch	·	1.5 km	MPC · JPL
848514	2004 HQ_{59}	—	April 25, 2004	Kitt Peak	Spacewatch	·	650 m	MPC · JPL
848515	2004 HR_{81}	—	April 28, 2004	Kitt Peak	Spacewatch	·	480 m	MPC · JPL
848516	2004 HR_{85}	—	September 6, 2008	Kitt Peak	Spacewatch	·	400 m	MPC · JPL
848517	2004 HX_{85}	—	April 25, 2004	Kitt Peak	Spacewatch	·	650 m	MPC · JPL
848518	2004 HA_{86}	—	April 25, 2004	Kitt Peak	Spacewatch	·	710 m	MPC · JPL
848519	2004 JK_{7}	—	May 9, 2004	Kitt Peak	Spacewatch	·	570 m	MPC · JPL
848520	2004 JT_{54}	—	May 9, 2004	Kitt Peak	Spacewatch	H	300 m	MPC · JPL
848521	2004 JN_{58}	—	February 12, 2018	Haleakala	Pan-STARRS 1	·	650 m	MPC · JPL
848522	2004 LQ_{28}	—	June 14, 2004	Kitt Peak	Spacewatch	·	990 m	MPC · JPL
848523	2004 LN_{32}	—	June 23, 2009	Mount Lemmon	Mount Lemmon Survey	·	1.4 km	MPC · JPL
848524	2004 MA	—	June 16, 2004	Kitt Peak	Spacewatch	·	450 m	MPC · JPL
848525	2004 MY_{9}	—	October 7, 2012	Haleakala	Pan-STARRS 1	·	910 m	MPC · JPL
848526	2004 NL_{34}	—	March 24, 2014	Haleakala	Pan-STARRS 1	·	530 m	MPC · JPL
848527	2004 OF_{17}	—	July 16, 2004	Siding Spring	SSS	·	1.1 km	MPC · JPL
848528	2004 OM_{17}	—	July 17, 2004	Cerro Tololo	Deep Ecliptic Survey	·	1.6 km	MPC · JPL
848529	2004 OF_{18}	—	July 17, 2004	Cerro Tololo	Deep Ecliptic Survey	·	2.0 km	MPC · JPL
848530	2004 PT_{5}	—	August 6, 2004	Palomar	NEAT	·	810 m	MPC · JPL
848531	2004 PL_{17}	—	July 11, 2004	Socorro	LINEAR	·	610 m	MPC · JPL
848532	2004 PH_{44}	—	August 7, 2004	Palomar	NEAT	·	850 m	MPC · JPL
848533	2004 PQ_{44}	—	August 7, 2004	Palomar	NEAT	·	460 m	MPC · JPL
848534	2004 PN_{49}	—	July 17, 2004	Cerro Tololo	Deep Ecliptic Survey	·	580 m	MPC · JPL
848535	2004 PB_{59}	—	August 9, 2004	Socorro	LINEAR	·	840 m	MPC · JPL
848536	2004 PL_{60}	—	August 9, 2004	Socorro	LINEAR	·	2.7 km	MPC · JPL
848537	2004 PF_{117}	—	August 12, 2004	Mauna Kea	P. A. Wiegert	·	1.1 km	MPC · JPL
848538	2004 PA_{119}	—	January 25, 2014	Haleakala	Pan-STARRS 1	·	920 m	MPC · JPL
848539	2004 PN_{119}	—	January 20, 2014	Mount Lemmon	Mount Lemmon Survey	·	910 m	MPC · JPL
848540	2004 PM_{120}	—	August 25, 2004	Kitt Peak	Spacewatch	·	760 m	MPC · JPL
848541	2004 PC_{122}	—	June 27, 2015	Haleakala	Pan-STARRS 2	·	1.8 km	MPC · JPL
848542	2004 QX_{5}	—	August 20, 2004	Kitt Peak	Spacewatch	·	1.3 km	MPC · JPL
848543	2004 QD_{6}	—	August 20, 2004	Kitt Peak	Spacewatch	BRG	940 m	MPC · JPL
848544	2004 QR_{31}	—	August 22, 2004	Kitt Peak	Spacewatch	·	600 m	MPC · JPL
848545	2004 QA_{32}	—	August 22, 2004	Kitt Peak	Spacewatch	BRG	1.0 km	MPC · JPL
848546	2004 QQ_{32}	—	August 23, 2004	Kitt Peak	Spacewatch	·	770 m	MPC · JPL
848547	2004 QU_{32}	—	August 22, 2004	Kitt Peak	Spacewatch	·	580 m	MPC · JPL
848548	2004 QW_{32}	—	August 25, 2004	Kitt Peak	Spacewatch	BRU	1.6 km	MPC · JPL
848549	2004 QB_{34}	—	March 14, 2007	Mount Lemmon	Mount Lemmon Survey	·	720 m	MPC · JPL
848550	2004 QT_{34}	—	April 29, 2014	Haleakala	Pan-STARRS 1	·	520 m	MPC · JPL
848551	2004 QX_{34}	—	August 25, 2004	Kitt Peak	Spacewatch	·	380 m	MPC · JPL
848552	2004 QD_{35}	—	July 29, 2011	Siding Spring	SSS	·	620 m	MPC · JPL
848553	2004 QL_{35}	—	May 22, 2014	Mount Lemmon	Mount Lemmon Survey	V	370 m	MPC · JPL
848554	2004 QZ_{35}	—	August 21, 2004	Siding Spring	SSS	·	730 m	MPC · JPL
848555	2004 QV_{36}	—	June 26, 2015	Haleakala	Pan-STARRS 1	·	2.1 km	MPC · JPL
848556	2004 QF_{37}	—	August 23, 2004	Kitt Peak	Spacewatch	·	1.9 km	MPC · JPL
848557	2004 QN_{37}	—	August 22, 2004	Kitt Peak	Spacewatch	·	980 m	MPC · JPL
848558	2004 QO_{37}	—	August 22, 2004	Kitt Peak	Spacewatch	RAF	510 m	MPC · JPL
848559	2004 QS_{37}	—	August 20, 2004	Kitt Peak	Spacewatch	·	1.3 km	MPC · JPL
848560	2004 QV_{37}	—	November 14, 2018	Haleakala	Pan-STARRS 2	·	1.4 km	MPC · JPL
848561	2004 QP_{38}	—	August 23, 2004	Kitt Peak	Spacewatch	·	650 m	MPC · JPL
848562	2004 QS_{38}	—	August 22, 2004	Kitt Peak	Spacewatch	·	1.1 km	MPC · JPL
848563	2004 QT_{38}	—	August 25, 2004	Kitt Peak	Spacewatch	(5)	760 m	MPC · JPL
848564	2004 QG_{39}	—	August 22, 2004	Kitt Peak	Spacewatch	·	630 m	MPC · JPL
848565	2004 QJ_{39}	—	August 22, 2004	Kitt Peak	Spacewatch	·	1.2 km	MPC · JPL
848566	2004 RC	—	August 20, 2004	Kitt Peak	Spacewatch	·	560 m	MPC · JPL
848567	2004 RU_{23}	—	September 8, 2004	Socorro	LINEAR	·	2.1 km	MPC · JPL
848568	2004 RF_{54}	—	September 8, 2004	Socorro	LINEAR	·	790 m	MPC · JPL
848569	2004 RA_{59}	—	September 8, 2004	Socorro	LINEAR	·	1.6 km	MPC · JPL
848570	2004 RA_{83}	—	September 8, 2004	Socorro	LINEAR	·	1.2 km	MPC · JPL
848571	2004 RR_{115}	—	August 14, 2004	Cerro Tololo	Deep Ecliptic Survey	·	1.6 km	MPC · JPL
848572	2004 RF_{118}	—	September 7, 2004	Kitt Peak	Spacewatch	·	1.1 km	MPC · JPL
848573	2004 RG_{118}	—	September 7, 2004	Kitt Peak	Spacewatch	(5)	740 m	MPC · JPL
848574	2004 RY_{120}	—	October 19, 1999	Kitt Peak	Spacewatch	·	1.1 km	MPC · JPL
848575	2004 RT_{124}	—	September 7, 2004	Kitt Peak	Spacewatch	·	710 m	MPC · JPL
848576	2004 RQ_{129}	—	September 7, 2004	Kitt Peak	Spacewatch	MAR	580 m	MPC · JPL
848577	2004 RD_{132}	—	September 7, 2004	Kitt Peak	Spacewatch	·	970 m	MPC · JPL
848578	2004 RA_{133}	—	September 7, 2004	Kitt Peak	Spacewatch	·	740 m	MPC · JPL
848579	2004 RL_{133}	—	September 7, 2004	Kitt Peak	Spacewatch	·	880 m	MPC · JPL
848580	2004 RD_{155}	—	August 23, 2004	Kitt Peak	Spacewatch	·	550 m	MPC · JPL
848581	2004 RX_{166}	—	September 7, 2004	Kitt Peak	Spacewatch	·	620 m	MPC · JPL
848582	2004 RB_{169}	—	July 16, 2004	Cerro Tololo	Deep Ecliptic Survey	·	370 m	MPC · JPL
848583	2004 RD_{171}	—	August 27, 2004	Catalina	CSS	·	960 m	MPC · JPL
848584	2004 RE_{173}	—	August 14, 2004	Cerro Tololo	Deep Ecliptic Survey	·	610 m	MPC · JPL
848585	2004 RE_{176}	—	September 10, 2004	Socorro	LINEAR	·	1.7 km	MPC · JPL
848586	2004 RP_{180}	—	September 10, 2004	Socorro	LINEAR	·	710 m	MPC · JPL
848587	2004 RF_{181}	—	September 10, 2004	Socorro	LINEAR	TIN	630 m	MPC · JPL
848588	2004 RF_{185}	—	September 10, 2004	Socorro	LINEAR	·	1.5 km	MPC · JPL
848589	2004 RJ_{205}	—	September 8, 2004	Palomar	NEAT	·	2.2 km	MPC · JPL
848590	2004 RC_{216}	—	August 20, 2004	Socorro	LINEAR	·	1.4 km	MPC · JPL
848591	2004 RN_{222}	—	September 14, 2004	Socorro	LINEAR	·	920 m	MPC · JPL
848592	2004 RP_{222}	—	September 12, 2004	Socorro	LINEAR	T_{j} (2.97)	2.4 km	MPC · JPL
848593	2004 RB_{235}	—	September 10, 2004	Socorro	LINEAR	·	1.6 km	MPC · JPL
848594	2004 RT_{237}	—	September 10, 2004	Kitt Peak	Spacewatch	·	860 m	MPC · JPL
848595	2004 RL_{243}	—	September 10, 2004	Kitt Peak	Spacewatch	·	1.6 km	MPC · JPL
848596	2004 RV_{249}	—	September 13, 2004	Kitt Peak	Spacewatch	·	760 m	MPC · JPL
848597	2004 RD_{258}	—	September 10, 2004	Socorro	LINEAR	·	370 m	MPC · JPL
848598	2004 RX_{258}	—	September 10, 2004	Kitt Peak	Spacewatch	·	920 m	MPC · JPL
848599	2004 RF_{260}	—	September 10, 2004	Kitt Peak	Spacewatch	·	1.1 km	MPC · JPL
848600	2004 RU_{266}	—	September 11, 2004	Kitt Peak	Spacewatch	·	750 m	MPC · JPL

== 848601–848700 ==
back to top

Designation			Discovery			Properties		Ref
Permanent	Provisional	Named after	Date	Site	Discoverer(s)	Category	Diam.	Ref
848601	2004 RS_{268}	—	September 11, 2004	Kitt Peak	Spacewatch	·	520 m	MPC · JPL
848602	2004 RU_{275}	—	August 25, 2004	Kitt Peak	Spacewatch	PHO	620 m	MPC · JPL
848603	2004 RU_{284}	—	September 15, 2004	Kitt Peak	Spacewatch	·	1.0 km	MPC · JPL
848604	2004 RX_{285}	—	September 15, 2004	Kitt Peak	Spacewatch	AGN	900 m	MPC · JPL
848605	2004 RQ_{298}	—	September 11, 2004	Kitt Peak	Spacewatch	V	350 m	MPC · JPL
848606	2004 RF_{300}	—	October 2, 2000	Kitt Peak	Spacewatch	·	890 m	MPC · JPL
848607	2004 RF_{304}	—	September 12, 2004	Kitt Peak	Spacewatch	·	1.3 km	MPC · JPL
848608	2004 RG_{312}	—	August 23, 2004	Anderson Mesa	LONEOS	·	590 m	MPC · JPL
848609	2004 RP_{326}	—	September 10, 2004	Socorro	LINEAR	·	870 m	MPC · JPL
848610	2004 RX_{334}	—	September 15, 2004	Anderson Mesa	LONEOS	·	710 m	MPC · JPL
848611	2004 RU_{347}	—	September 12, 2004	Mauna Kea	P. A. Wiegert, S. Popa	·	750 m	MPC · JPL
848612	2004 RB_{353}	—	September 11, 2004	Kitt Peak	Spacewatch	·	1.3 km	MPC · JPL
848613	2004 RP_{359}	—	September 24, 2008	Kitt Peak	Spacewatch	MAS	570 m	MPC · JPL
848614	2004 RP_{360}	—	August 14, 2015	Haleakala	Pan-STARRS 1	·	2.5 km	MPC · JPL
848615	2004 RR_{360}	—	September 26, 2011	Mount Lemmon	Mount Lemmon Survey	·	540 m	MPC · JPL
848616	2004 RX_{360}	—	September 15, 2004	Kitt Peak	Spacewatch	·	990 m	MPC · JPL
848617	2004 RQ_{362}	—	April 27, 2012	Haleakala	Pan-STARRS 1	·	1.2 km	MPC · JPL
848618	2004 RZ_{362}	—	May 5, 2008	Kitt Peak	Spacewatch	DOR	1.5 km	MPC · JPL
848619	2004 RA_{363}	—	October 31, 2008	Kitt Peak	Spacewatch	·	770 m	MPC · JPL
848620	2004 RL_{363}	—	December 1, 1996	Kitt Peak	Spacewatch	·	900 m	MPC · JPL
848621	2004 RB_{364}	—	November 24, 2008	Kitt Peak	Spacewatch	·	660 m	MPC · JPL
848622	2004 RK_{364}	—	November 20, 2015	Mount Lemmon	Mount Lemmon Survey	V	440 m	MPC · JPL
848623	2004 RL_{365}	—	September 11, 2004	Kitt Peak	Spacewatch	·	820 m	MPC · JPL
848624	2004 RF_{366}	—	September 9, 2004	Kitt Peak	Spacewatch	(5)	720 m	MPC · JPL
848625	2004 RG_{366}	—	September 12, 2004	Kitt Peak	Spacewatch	·	1.3 km	MPC · JPL
848626	2004 RU_{366}	—	September 11, 2004	Kitt Peak	Spacewatch	·	990 m	MPC · JPL
848627	2004 RW_{366}	—	September 12, 2004	Kitt Peak	Spacewatch	·	530 m	MPC · JPL
848628	2004 RR_{367}	—	October 10, 2004	Kitt Peak	Deep Ecliptic Survey	·	620 m	MPC · JPL
848629	2004 SW_{2}	—	September 17, 2004	Bergisch Gladbach	W. Bickel	·	650 m	MPC · JPL
848630	2004 SM_{4}	—	August 25, 2004	Kitt Peak	Spacewatch	(5)	770 m	MPC · JPL
848631	2004 SC_{20}	—	September 21, 2004	Kitt Peak	Spacewatch	NYS	890 m	MPC · JPL
848632	2004 SD_{34}	—	September 17, 2004	Kitt Peak	Spacewatch	·	900 m	MPC · JPL
848633	2004 SR_{34}	—	August 25, 2004	Kitt Peak	Spacewatch	·	940 m	MPC · JPL
848634	2004 SY_{35}	—	September 9, 2004	Kitt Peak	Spacewatch	·	1.1 km	MPC · JPL
848635	2004 SO_{62}	—	September 16, 2004	Kitt Peak	Spacewatch	KOR	860 m	MPC · JPL
848636	2004 SV_{62}	—	January 2, 2014	Catalina	CSS	·	1.2 km	MPC · JPL
848637	2004 SQ_{63}	—	August 27, 2011	Haleakala	Pan-STARRS 1	·	520 m	MPC · JPL
848638	2004 SG_{66}	—	September 22, 2004	Kitt Peak	Spacewatch	·	490 m	MPC · JPL
848639	2004 TD_{6}	—	October 5, 2004	Kitt Peak	Spacewatch	·	1.2 km	MPC · JPL
848640	2004 TC_{8}	—	October 5, 2004	Anderson Mesa	LONEOS	·	1.7 km	MPC · JPL
848641	2004 TU_{9}	—	October 4, 2004	Kitt Peak	Spacewatch	H	270 m	MPC · JPL
848642	2004 TG_{11}	—	October 8, 2004	Socorro	LINEAR	·	680 m	MPC · JPL
848643	2004 TZ_{13}	—	September 17, 2004	Socorro	LINEAR	·	760 m	MPC · JPL
848644	2004 TO_{18}	—	September 22, 2004	Socorro	LINEAR	·	460 m	MPC · JPL
848645	2004 TH_{20}	—	October 15, 2004	Socorro	LINEAR	·	1.0 km	MPC · JPL
848646	2004 TT_{20}	—	October 7, 2004	Kitt Peak	Spacewatch	·	480 m	MPC · JPL
848647	2004 TN_{21}	—	October 4, 2004	Sacramento Peak	SDSS Collaboration	·	1.4 km	MPC · JPL
848648	2004 TV_{23}	—	October 4, 2004	Kitt Peak	Spacewatch	·	770 m	MPC · JPL
848649	2004 TB_{26}	—	October 4, 2004	Kitt Peak	Spacewatch	·	660 m	MPC · JPL
848650	2004 TH_{29}	—	October 4, 2004	Kitt Peak	Spacewatch	·	910 m	MPC · JPL
848651	2004 TT_{29}	—	October 4, 2004	Kitt Peak	Spacewatch	NYS	760 m	MPC · JPL
848652	2004 TA_{30}	—	October 4, 2004	Kitt Peak	Spacewatch	·	660 m	MPC · JPL
848653	2004 TT_{30}	—	October 4, 2004	Kitt Peak	Spacewatch	·	870 m	MPC · JPL
848654	2004 TR_{35}	—	September 7, 2004	Kitt Peak	Spacewatch	PHO · critical	660 m	MPC · JPL
848655	2004 TC_{47}	—	October 4, 2004	Kitt Peak	Spacewatch	PHO	640 m	MPC · JPL
848656	2004 TM_{47}	—	October 4, 2004	Kitt Peak	Spacewatch	·	1.1 km	MPC · JPL
848657	2004 TC_{49}	—	October 4, 2004	Kitt Peak	Spacewatch	·	1.0 km	MPC · JPL
848658	2004 TR_{49}	—	October 4, 2004	Kitt Peak	Spacewatch	·	1.4 km	MPC · JPL
848659	2004 TB_{57}	—	October 5, 2004	Kitt Peak	Spacewatch	·	1.4 km	MPC · JPL
848660	2004 TQ_{57}	—	October 5, 2004	Kitt Peak	Spacewatch	PHO	680 m	MPC · JPL
848661	2004 TT_{57}	—	October 5, 2004	Kitt Peak	Spacewatch	·	560 m	MPC · JPL
848662	2004 TZ_{58}	—	September 13, 2004	Palomar	NEAT	·	760 m	MPC · JPL
848663	2004 TL_{62}	—	September 17, 2004	Kitt Peak	Spacewatch	·	1.1 km	MPC · JPL
848664	2004 TX_{78}	—	October 4, 2004	Kitt Peak	Spacewatch	·	600 m	MPC · JPL
848665	2004 TN_{79}	—	October 4, 2004	Kitt Peak	Spacewatch	·	910 m	MPC · JPL
848666	2004 TG_{83}	—	October 5, 2004	Kitt Peak	Spacewatch	EUN	830 m	MPC · JPL
848667	2004 TX_{86}	—	October 5, 2004	Kitt Peak	Spacewatch	·	670 m	MPC · JPL
848668	2004 TS_{87}	—	October 5, 2004	Kitt Peak	Spacewatch	(5)	820 m	MPC · JPL
848669	2004 TH_{88}	—	October 5, 2004	Kitt Peak	Spacewatch	·	600 m	MPC · JPL
848670	2004 TY_{88}	—	October 5, 2004	Kitt Peak	Spacewatch	·	760 m	MPC · JPL
848671	2004 TE_{91}	—	October 5, 2004	Kitt Peak	Spacewatch	·	1.6 km	MPC · JPL
848672	2004 TG_{91}	—	October 5, 2004	Kitt Peak	Spacewatch	·	1.1 km	MPC · JPL
848673	2004 TW_{95}	—	September 17, 2004	Kitt Peak	Spacewatch	·	860 m	MPC · JPL
848674	2004 TC_{120}	—	October 6, 2004	Palomar	NEAT	·	1.1 km	MPC · JPL
848675	2004 TD_{120}	—	August 11, 2004	Socorro	LINEAR	·	1.2 km	MPC · JPL
848676	2004 TV_{126}	—	October 7, 2004	Socorro	LINEAR	·	720 m	MPC · JPL
848677	2004 TL_{135}	—	September 20, 2004	Goodricke-Pigott	R. A. Tucker	·	1.5 km	MPC · JPL
848678	2004 TQ_{140}	—	October 4, 2004	Kitt Peak	Spacewatch	(5)	960 m	MPC · JPL
848679	2004 TM_{142}	—	September 22, 2004	Kitt Peak	Spacewatch	·	640 m	MPC · JPL
848680	2004 TX_{143}	—	October 4, 2004	Kitt Peak	Spacewatch	·	1.5 km	MPC · JPL
848681	2004 TO_{146}	—	October 6, 2004	Kitt Peak	Spacewatch	EOS	1.0 km	MPC · JPL
848682	2004 TB_{148}	—	October 6, 2004	Kitt Peak	Spacewatch	·	1.9 km	MPC · JPL
848683	2004 TN_{152}	—	October 6, 2004	Kitt Peak	Spacewatch	·	1.1 km	MPC · JPL
848684	2004 TU_{156}	—	October 6, 2004	Kitt Peak	Spacewatch	·	960 m	MPC · JPL
848685	2004 TV_{158}	—	October 6, 2004	Kitt Peak	Spacewatch	·	540 m	MPC · JPL
848686	2004 TM_{159}	—	October 6, 2004	Kitt Peak	Spacewatch	·	570 m	MPC · JPL
848687	2004 TF_{160}	—	October 6, 2004	Kitt Peak	Spacewatch	·	1.3 km	MPC · JPL
848688	2004 TO_{182}	—	October 7, 2004	Kitt Peak	Spacewatch	·	1.0 km	MPC · JPL
848689	2004 TF_{185}	—	October 7, 2004	Kitt Peak	Spacewatch	EOS	1.2 km	MPC · JPL
848690	2004 TC_{186}	—	October 7, 2004	Kitt Peak	Spacewatch	·	670 m	MPC · JPL
848691	2004 TF_{192}	—	October 7, 2004	Kitt Peak	Spacewatch	·	1.3 km	MPC · JPL
848692	2004 TK_{198}	—	October 7, 2004	Kitt Peak	Spacewatch	·	790 m	MPC · JPL
848693	2004 TL_{198}	—	October 7, 2004	Kitt Peak	Spacewatch	·	860 m	MPC · JPL
848694	2004 TA_{208}	—	October 7, 2004	Kitt Peak	Spacewatch	·	1.0 km	MPC · JPL
848695	2004 TO_{214}	—	October 9, 2004	Kitt Peak	Spacewatch	EOS	1.2 km	MPC · JPL
848696	2004 TQ_{219}	—	October 5, 2004	Kitt Peak	Spacewatch	·	720 m	MPC · JPL
848697	2004 TP_{223}	—	October 8, 2004	Kitt Peak	Spacewatch	·	790 m	MPC · JPL
848698	2004 TT_{228}	—	October 8, 2004	Kitt Peak	Spacewatch	EUN	840 m	MPC · JPL
848699	2004 TP_{237}	—	October 9, 2004	Kitt Peak	Spacewatch	NYS	830 m	MPC · JPL
848700	2004 TA_{239}	—	October 9, 2004	Kitt Peak	Spacewatch	·	750 m	MPC · JPL

== 848701–848800 ==
back to top

Designation			Discovery			Properties		Ref
Permanent	Provisional	Named after	Date	Site	Discoverer(s)	Category	Diam.	Ref
848701	2004 TS_{244}	—	October 7, 2004	Kitt Peak	Spacewatch	·	1.1 km	MPC · JPL
848702	2004 TF_{252}	—	October 9, 2004	Kitt Peak	Spacewatch	·	1.8 km	MPC · JPL
848703	2004 TA_{253}	—	October 9, 2004	Kitt Peak	Spacewatch	·	1.0 km	MPC · JPL
848704	2004 TN_{255}	—	October 9, 2004	Kitt Peak	Spacewatch	NYS	700 m	MPC · JPL
848705	2004 TP_{255}	—	October 9, 2004	Kitt Peak	Spacewatch	·	800 m	MPC · JPL
848706	2004 TH_{256}	—	October 9, 2004	Kitt Peak	Spacewatch	·	750 m	MPC · JPL
848707	2004 TS_{257}	—	October 9, 2004	Kitt Peak	Spacewatch	MAR	770 m	MPC · JPL
848708	2004 TX_{257}	—	October 9, 2004	Kitt Peak	Spacewatch	·	920 m	MPC · JPL
848709	2004 TF_{267}	—	October 9, 2004	Kitt Peak	Spacewatch	·	1.2 km	MPC · JPL
848710	2004 TJ_{280}	—	October 10, 2004	Kitt Peak	Spacewatch	·	910 m	MPC · JPL
848711	2004 TY_{281}	—	October 11, 2004	Kitt Peak	Spacewatch	NYS	680 m	MPC · JPL
848712	2004 TG_{282}	—	October 7, 2004	Palomar	NEAT	·	920 m	MPC · JPL
848713	2004 TJ_{294}	—	October 10, 2004	Kitt Peak	Spacewatch	·	780 m	MPC · JPL
848714	2004 TA_{295}	—	October 10, 2004	Kitt Peak	Spacewatch	·	490 m	MPC · JPL
848715	2004 TA_{304}	—	October 10, 2004	Kitt Peak	Spacewatch	·	800 m	MPC · JPL
848716	2004 TH_{305}	—	October 10, 2004	Kitt Peak	Spacewatch	·	990 m	MPC · JPL
848717	2004 TM_{309}	—	October 10, 2004	Kitt Peak	Spacewatch	·	980 m	MPC · JPL
848718	2004 TX_{309}	—	October 10, 2004	Kitt Peak	Spacewatch	·	450 m	MPC · JPL
848719	2004 TR_{311}	—	October 11, 2004	Kitt Peak	Spacewatch	(5)	790 m	MPC · JPL
848720	2004 TY_{312}	—	October 11, 2004	Kitt Peak	Spacewatch	EOS	1.3 km	MPC · JPL
848721	2004 TS_{313}	—	October 11, 2004	Kitt Peak	Spacewatch	·	660 m	MPC · JPL
848722	2004 TM_{315}	—	September 10, 2004	Kitt Peak	Spacewatch	·	920 m	MPC · JPL
848723	2004 TZ_{315}	—	October 11, 2004	Kitt Peak	Spacewatch	·	880 m	MPC · JPL
848724	2004 TU_{325}	—	October 13, 2004	Kitt Peak	Spacewatch	·	1.2 km	MPC · JPL
848725	2004 TP_{330}	—	September 23, 2004	Kitt Peak	Spacewatch	·	560 m	MPC · JPL
848726	2004 TJ_{334}	—	October 9, 2004	Kitt Peak	Spacewatch	·	1.0 km	MPC · JPL
848727	2004 TM_{338}	—	October 12, 2004	Kitt Peak	Spacewatch	·	2.8 km	MPC · JPL
848728	2004 TT_{339}	—	October 13, 2004	Kitt Peak	Spacewatch	·	530 m	MPC · JPL
848729	2004 TV_{339}	—	October 13, 2004	Kitt Peak	Spacewatch	·	940 m	MPC · JPL
848730	2004 TC_{341}	—	October 13, 2004	Kitt Peak	Spacewatch	MAS	570 m	MPC · JPL
848731	2004 TW_{358}	—	October 6, 2004	Kitt Peak	Spacewatch	·	500 m	MPC · JPL
848732	2004 TU_{360}	—	August 1, 2000	Cerro Tololo	Deep Ecliptic Survey	·	800 m	MPC · JPL
848733	2004 TB_{362}	—	October 15, 2004	Mount Lemmon	Mount Lemmon Survey	·	540 m	MPC · JPL
848734	2004 TG_{362}	—	October 15, 2004	Mount Lemmon	Mount Lemmon Survey	·	910 m	MPC · JPL
848735	2004 TJ_{371}	—	November 3, 2015	Mount Lemmon	Mount Lemmon Survey	·	1.4 km	MPC · JPL
848736	2004 TW_{377}	—	September 24, 2014	Kitt Peak	Spacewatch	·	430 m	MPC · JPL
848737	2004 TK_{378}	—	October 10, 2008	Mount Lemmon	Mount Lemmon Survey	·	1.2 km	MPC · JPL
848738	2004 TE_{380}	—	May 27, 2011	Nogales	M. Schwartz, P. R. Holvorcem	MAS	500 m	MPC · JPL
848739	2004 TH_{380}	—	October 3, 2011	Mount Lemmon	Mount Lemmon Survey	·	600 m	MPC · JPL
848740	2004 TL_{380}	—	February 26, 2014	Haleakala	Pan-STARRS 1	MAS	640 m	MPC · JPL
848741	2004 TC_{381}	—	November 24, 2008	Kitt Peak	Spacewatch	·	720 m	MPC · JPL
848742	2004 TD_{381}	—	December 28, 2017	Haleakala	Pan-STARRS 1	MAR	910 m	MPC · JPL
848743	2004 TJ_{381}	—	November 19, 2008	Kitt Peak	Spacewatch	·	660 m	MPC · JPL
848744	2004 TX_{381}	—	September 26, 2011	Mount Lemmon	Mount Lemmon Survey	·	490 m	MPC · JPL
848745	2004 TO_{383}	—	October 4, 2004	Kitt Peak	Spacewatch	KOR	930 m	MPC · JPL
848746	2004 TP_{383}	—	June 27, 2015	Haleakala	Pan-STARRS 1	·	790 m	MPC · JPL
848747	2004 TB_{385}	—	October 10, 2004	Kitt Peak	Deep Ecliptic Survey	·	2.4 km	MPC · JPL
848748	2004 TV_{385}	—	October 7, 2004	Kitt Peak	Spacewatch	·	2.0 km	MPC · JPL
848749	2004 TA_{386}	—	October 6, 2004	Kitt Peak	Spacewatch	·	530 m	MPC · JPL
848750	2004 TV_{387}	—	October 8, 2004	Kitt Peak	Spacewatch	·	850 m	MPC · JPL
848751	2004 UT_{11}	—	March 2, 2006	Kitt Peak	Spacewatch	NYS	670 m	MPC · JPL
848752	2004 UV_{11}	—	July 2, 2014	Haleakala	Pan-STARRS 1	·	620 m	MPC · JPL
848753	2004 VQ_{2}	—	October 10, 2004	Kitt Peak	Spacewatch	critical	1.6 km	MPC · JPL
848754	2004 VZ_{20}	—	November 4, 2004	Catalina	CSS	·	870 m	MPC · JPL
848755	2004 VO_{26}	—	November 4, 2004	Catalina	CSS	·	530 m	MPC · JPL
848756	2004 VP_{30}	—	November 3, 2004	Kitt Peak	Spacewatch	MIS	2.1 km	MPC · JPL
848757	2004 VJ_{36}	—	July 8, 2018	Haleakala	Pan-STARRS 1	MAS	470 m	MPC · JPL
848758	2004 VJ_{42}	—	October 15, 2004	Mount Lemmon	Mount Lemmon Survey	NYS	780 m	MPC · JPL
848759	2004 VY_{42}	—	November 4, 2004	Kitt Peak	Spacewatch	·	720 m	MPC · JPL
848760	2004 VY_{45}	—	November 4, 2004	Kitt Peak	Spacewatch	·	1.1 km	MPC · JPL
848761	2004 VC_{48}	—	November 4, 2004	Kitt Peak	Spacewatch	·	700 m	MPC · JPL
848762	2004 VB_{52}	—	November 4, 2004	Catalina	CSS	T_{j} (2.95)	3.7 km	MPC · JPL
848763	2004 VJ_{68}	—	November 10, 2004	Kitt Peak	Spacewatch	(5)	830 m	MPC · JPL
848764	2004 VX_{83}	—	October 15, 2004	Kitt Peak	Spacewatch	·	670 m	MPC · JPL
848765	2004 VS_{89}	—	November 11, 2004	Kitt Peak	Spacewatch	EUN	780 m	MPC · JPL
848766	2004 VN_{94}	—	November 10, 2004	Kitt Peak	Spacewatch	T_{j} (2.99) · 3:2	3.2 km	MPC · JPL
848767	2004 VF_{99}	—	November 9, 2004	Mauna Kea	Veillet, C.	·	890 m	MPC · JPL
848768	2004 VJ_{108}	—	November 9, 2004	Mauna Kea	Veillet, C.	·	2.2 km	MPC · JPL
848769	2004 VT_{129}	—	November 11, 2004	Kitt Peak	Deep Ecliptic Survey	·	470 m	MPC · JPL
848770	2004 VR_{132}	—	January 20, 2009	Kitt Peak	Spacewatch	·	550 m	MPC · JPL
848771	2004 VH_{133}	—	October 29, 2017	Haleakala	Pan-STARRS 1	EUN	860 m	MPC · JPL
848772	2004 VO_{134}	—	November 11, 2004	Kitt Peak	Spacewatch	·	1.3 km	MPC · JPL
848773	2004 VU_{135}	—	May 21, 2014	Haleakala	Pan-STARRS 1	·	670 m	MPC · JPL
848774	2004 VQ_{136}	—	August 20, 2014	Haleakala	Pan-STARRS 1	·	1.6 km	MPC · JPL
848775	2004 VW_{137}	—	February 17, 2020	Mount Lemmon	Mount Lemmon Survey	·	690 m	MPC · JPL
848776	2004 VC_{138}	—	November 4, 2004	Kitt Peak	Spacewatch	·	1.6 km	MPC · JPL
848777	2004 VS_{138}	—	November 11, 2004	Kitt Peak	Spacewatch	·	2.2 km	MPC · JPL
848778	2004 VG_{139}	—	November 11, 2004	Kitt Peak	Spacewatch	H	570 m	MPC · JPL
848779	2004 WK_{13}	—	December 17, 2011	Mount Lemmon	Mount Lemmon Survey	·	510 m	MPC · JPL
848780	2004 WW_{13}	—	December 22, 2008	Mount Lemmon	Mount Lemmon Survey	NYS	760 m	MPC · JPL
848781	2004 WH_{14}	—	October 12, 1999	Kitt Peak	Spacewatch	·	1.1 km	MPC · JPL
848782	2004 WM_{14}	—	November 17, 2004	Campo Imperatore	CINEOS	·	740 m	MPC · JPL
848783	2004 XC_{16}	—	December 10, 2004	Kitt Peak	Spacewatch	·	1.1 km	MPC · JPL
848784	2004 XS_{35}	—	December 2, 2004	Catalina	CSS	·	1.1 km	MPC · JPL
848785	2004 XS_{42}	—	December 7, 2004	Socorro	LINEAR	·	610 m	MPC · JPL
848786	2004 XF_{55}	—	December 10, 2004	Kitt Peak	Spacewatch	·	630 m	MPC · JPL
848787	2004 XA_{60}	—	December 3, 2004	Kitt Peak	Spacewatch	JUN	890 m	MPC · JPL
848788	2004 XD_{89}	—	December 10, 2004	Campo Imperatore	CINEOS	·	1.5 km	MPC · JPL
848789	2004 XC_{154}	—	December 15, 2004	Kitt Peak	Spacewatch	·	610 m	MPC · JPL
848790	2004 XB_{173}	—	December 10, 2004	Kitt Peak	Spacewatch	·	910 m	MPC · JPL
848791	2004 XF_{189}	—	December 15, 2004	Mauna Kea	P. A. Wiegert, D. D. Balam	·	570 m	MPC · JPL
848792	2004 XH_{194}	—	November 22, 2011	Mount Lemmon	Mount Lemmon Survey	·	500 m	MPC · JPL
848793	2004 XB_{195}	—	January 29, 2014	Kitt Peak	Spacewatch	·	1.3 km	MPC · JPL
848794	2004 XG_{195}	—	December 13, 2004	Kitt Peak	Spacewatch	·	1.4 km	MPC · JPL
848795	2004 XJ_{195}	—	April 10, 2013	Haleakala	Pan-STARRS 1	(2076)	610 m	MPC · JPL
848796	2004 XM_{195}	—	January 14, 2016	Haleakala	Pan-STARRS 1	·	1.6 km	MPC · JPL
848797	2004 XY_{195}	—	August 30, 2016	Haleakala	Pan-STARRS 1	·	1.1 km	MPC · JPL
848798	2004 XD_{197}	—	January 3, 2016	Haleakala	Pan-STARRS 1	EOS	1.3 km	MPC · JPL
848799	2004 XM_{197}	—	December 12, 2017	Haleakala	Pan-STARRS 1	·	1.1 km	MPC · JPL
848800	2004 XO_{197}	—	January 3, 2017	Haleakala	Pan-STARRS 1	·	2.7 km	MPC · JPL

== 848801–848900 ==
back to top

Designation			Discovery			Properties		Ref
Permanent	Provisional	Named after	Date	Site	Discoverer(s)	Category	Diam.	Ref
848801	2004 XX_{197}	—	November 22, 2011	Mount Lemmon	Mount Lemmon Survey	·	570 m	MPC · JPL
848802	2004 XU_{198}	—	August 30, 2014	Mount Lemmon	Mount Lemmon Survey	·	680 m	MPC · JPL
848803	2004 XY_{198}	—	December 12, 2004	Kitt Peak	Spacewatch	·	1.0 km	MPC · JPL
848804	2004 YK_{38}	—	October 19, 2011	Kitt Peak	Spacewatch	·	700 m	MPC · JPL
848805	2004 YS_{38}	—	October 26, 2008	Kitt Peak	Spacewatch	·	1.1 km	MPC · JPL
848806	2004 YY_{38}	—	July 3, 2016	Mount Lemmon	Mount Lemmon Survey	EUN	810 m	MPC · JPL
848807	2004 YF_{39}	—	October 25, 2011	Haleakala	Pan-STARRS 1	·	740 m	MPC · JPL
848808	2004 YU_{39}	—	December 16, 2004	Kitt Peak	Spacewatch	·	680 m	MPC · JPL
848809	2004 YF_{40}	—	July 13, 2013	Haleakala	Pan-STARRS 1	·	2.0 km	MPC · JPL
848810	2004 YH_{40}	—	January 20, 2016	Haleakala	Pan-STARRS 1	PHO	610 m	MPC · JPL
848811	2004 YJ_{40}	—	December 16, 2004	Kitt Peak	Spacewatch	JUN	850 m	MPC · JPL
848812	2004 YA_{41}	—	October 26, 2014	Mount Lemmon	Mount Lemmon Survey	·	520 m	MPC · JPL
848813	2004 YA_{42}	—	December 18, 2004	Mount Lemmon	Mount Lemmon Survey	·	1.1 km	MPC · JPL
848814	2005 AE_{18}	—	January 6, 2005	Socorro	LINEAR	·	1.5 km	MPC · JPL
848815	2005 AF_{62}	—	January 15, 2005	Kitt Peak	Spacewatch	H	330 m	MPC · JPL
848816	2005 AF_{64}	—	January 13, 2005	Kitt Peak	Spacewatch	H	370 m	MPC · JPL
848817	2005 AJ_{74}	—	January 15, 2005	Kitt Peak	Spacewatch	·	710 m	MPC · JPL
848818	2005 AA_{85}	—	February 5, 2016	Haleakala	Pan-STARRS 1	·	820 m	MPC · JPL
848819	2005 AJ_{85}	—	January 13, 2005	Kitt Peak	Spacewatch	·	770 m	MPC · JPL
848820	2005 AP_{85}	—	January 15, 2005	Kitt Peak	Spacewatch	·	2.0 km	MPC · JPL
848821	2005 AR_{85}	—	October 30, 2014	Mount Lemmon	Mount Lemmon Survey	L5	6.7 km	MPC · JPL
848822	2005 BE_{13}	—	January 17, 2005	Socorro	LINEAR	·	1.2 km	MPC · JPL
848823	2005 BN_{14}	—	January 20, 2005	Wrightwood	J. W. Young	·	1.0 km	MPC · JPL
848824	2005 BE_{15}	—	January 16, 2005	Kitt Peak	Spacewatch	·	1.2 km	MPC · JPL
848825	2005 BX_{32}	—	January 16, 2005	Mauna Kea	Veillet, C.	·	1.4 km	MPC · JPL
848826	2005 BW_{33}	—	January 16, 2005	Mauna Kea	Veillet, C.	KOR	950 m	MPC · JPL
848827	2005 BH_{34}	—	January 16, 2005	Mauna Kea	Veillet, C.	·	1.1 km	MPC · JPL
848828	2005 BO_{34}	—	January 15, 2005	Kitt Peak	Spacewatch	·	1.2 km	MPC · JPL
848829	2005 BQ_{34}	—	January 15, 2005	Kitt Peak	Spacewatch	NYS	820 m	MPC · JPL
848830	2005 BZ_{35}	—	January 16, 2005	Mauna Kea	Veillet, C.	·	1.1 km	MPC · JPL
848831	2005 BS_{37}	—	January 19, 2005	Kitt Peak	Spacewatch	·	2.1 km	MPC · JPL
848832	2005 BV_{38}	—	January 16, 2005	Mauna Kea	Veillet, C.	·	2.1 km	MPC · JPL
848833	2005 BW_{38}	—	January 16, 2005	Mauna Kea	Veillet, C.	NEM	1.4 km	MPC · JPL
848834	2005 BP_{40}	—	January 16, 2005	Mauna Kea	Veillet, C.	·	1.8 km	MPC · JPL
848835	2005 BM_{44}	—	January 16, 2005	Mauna Kea	Veillet, C.	·	1.0 km	MPC · JPL
848836	2005 BD_{54}	—	January 2, 2009	Mount Lemmon	Mount Lemmon Survey	·	970 m	MPC · JPL
848837	2005 BF_{56}	—	June 6, 2018	Haleakala	Pan-STARRS 1	·	1.9 km	MPC · JPL
848838	2005 BG_{56}	—	January 15, 2018	Haleakala	Pan-STARRS 1	L5	6.3 km	MPC · JPL
848839	2005 BM_{56}	—	January 17, 2005	Kitt Peak	Spacewatch	·	1.4 km	MPC · JPL
848840	2005 BJ_{57}	—	March 26, 2011	Mount Lemmon	Mount Lemmon Survey	·	1.7 km	MPC · JPL
848841	2005 CN_{27}	—	January 16, 2005	Kitt Peak	Spacewatch	·	790 m	MPC · JPL
848842	2005 CB_{33}	—	February 2, 2005	Kitt Peak	Spacewatch	·	730 m	MPC · JPL
848843	2005 CH_{83}	—	November 9, 2007	Kitt Peak	Spacewatch	·	500 m	MPC · JPL
848844	2005 CA_{84}	—	November 20, 2008	Kitt Peak	Spacewatch	·	1.0 km	MPC · JPL
848845	2005 CC_{84}	—	February 9, 2005	Mount Lemmon	Mount Lemmon Survey	(1547)	1.1 km	MPC · JPL
848846	2005 CY_{85}	—	October 9, 2007	Mount Lemmon	Mount Lemmon Survey	·	890 m	MPC · JPL
848847	2005 CF_{86}	—	November 24, 2017	Haleakala	Pan-STARRS 1	·	1.4 km	MPC · JPL
848848	2005 CH_{86}	—	February 2, 2005	Kitt Peak	Spacewatch	·	550 m	MPC · JPL
848849	2005 CW_{87}	—	January 5, 2016	Haleakala	Pan-STARRS 1	·	800 m	MPC · JPL
848850	2005 CJ_{88}	—	February 9, 2005	Kitt Peak	Spacewatch	·	880 m	MPC · JPL
848851	2005 CQ_{88}	—	September 21, 2011	Mount Lemmon	Mount Lemmon Survey	·	1.3 km	MPC · JPL
848852	2005 CT_{88}	—	February 9, 2005	Mount Lemmon	Mount Lemmon Survey	·	510 m	MPC · JPL
848853	2005 CV_{89}	—	February 9, 2005	Kitt Peak	Spacewatch	MAS	490 m	MPC · JPL
848854	2005 CG_{90}	—	February 4, 2005	Kitt Peak	Spacewatch	·	1.2 km	MPC · JPL
848855	2005 DG	—	February 17, 2005	La Silla	A. Boattini, H. Scholl	·	1.0 km	MPC · JPL
848856	2005 DT_{4}	—	February 18, 2005	La Silla	A. Boattini, H. Scholl	·	400 m	MPC · JPL
848857	2005 EL_{15}	—	March 3, 2005	Kitt Peak	Spacewatch	NYS	720 m	MPC · JPL
848858	2005 EM_{16}	—	March 3, 2005	Kitt Peak	Spacewatch	T_{j} (2.99)	2.3 km	MPC · JPL
848859	2005 EJ_{33}	—	February 23, 2001	Haleakala	NEAT	·	1.4 km	MPC · JPL
848860	2005 ER_{54}	—	March 4, 2005	Kitt Peak	Spacewatch	·	1.4 km	MPC · JPL
848861	2005 EU_{57}	—	September 12, 2007	Mount Lemmon	Mount Lemmon Survey	MAS	510 m	MPC · JPL
848862	2005 EM_{59}	—	February 9, 2005	Kitt Peak	Spacewatch	TIR	2.2 km	MPC · JPL
848863	2005 EZ_{69}	—	January 16, 2005	Socorro	LINEAR	·	860 m	MPC · JPL
848864	2005 EZ_{86}	—	March 4, 2005	Mount Lemmon	Mount Lemmon Survey	·	1.2 km	MPC · JPL
848865	2005 EC_{103}	—	March 4, 2005	Kitt Peak	Spacewatch	·	810 m	MPC · JPL
848866	2005 EF_{103}	—	March 4, 2005	Kitt Peak	Spacewatch	MAS	580 m	MPC · JPL
848867	2005 EF_{110}	—	March 29, 2014	Mount Lemmon	Mount Lemmon Survey	·	1.1 km	MPC · JPL
848868	2005 EB_{122}	—	March 8, 2005	Mount Lemmon	Mount Lemmon Survey	·	1.4 km	MPC · JPL
848869	2005 ED_{136}	—	March 9, 2005	Anderson Mesa	LONEOS	·	2.3 km	MPC · JPL
848870	2005 EC_{145}	—	March 10, 2005	Mount Lemmon	Mount Lemmon Survey	·	440 m	MPC · JPL
848871	2005 EU_{147}	—	March 10, 2005	Kitt Peak	Spacewatch	·	430 m	MPC · JPL
848872	2005 EW_{166}	—	March 11, 2005	Mount Lemmon	Mount Lemmon Survey	·	1.5 km	MPC · JPL
848873	2005 EJ_{170}	—	November 27, 2010	Mount Lemmon	Mount Lemmon Survey	·	440 m	MPC · JPL
848874	2005 EB_{248}	—	March 12, 2005	Kitt Peak	Spacewatch	(1547)	950 m	MPC · JPL
848875	2005 EM_{254}	—	March 11, 2005	Mount Lemmon	Mount Lemmon Survey	·	1.3 km	MPC · JPL
848876	2005 EQ_{258}	—	March 11, 2005	Mount Lemmon	Mount Lemmon Survey	·	670 m	MPC · JPL
848877	2005 ER_{273}	—	March 5, 2005	Mauna Kea	D. J. Tholen, F. Bernardi	THM	1.6 km	MPC · JPL
848878	2005 EV_{284}	—	March 11, 2005	Mount Lemmon	Mount Lemmon Survey	·	1.8 km	MPC · JPL
848879	2005 EM_{294}	—	March 11, 2005	Mount Lemmon	Mount Lemmon Survey	·	1.1 km	MPC · JPL
848880	2005 EC_{301}	—	March 11, 2005	Kitt Peak	Deep Ecliptic Survey	·	1.2 km	MPC · JPL
848881	2005 EX_{307}	—	March 8, 2005	Mount Lemmon	Mount Lemmon Survey	·	2.1 km	MPC · JPL
848882	2005 EF_{308}	—	March 4, 2005	Mount Lemmon	Mount Lemmon Survey	MAR	660 m	MPC · JPL
848883	2005 EL_{309}	—	March 9, 2005	Mount Lemmon	Mount Lemmon Survey	NYS	620 m	MPC · JPL
848884	2005 ES_{337}	—	January 14, 2016	Haleakala	Pan-STARRS 1	·	2.2 km	MPC · JPL
848885	2005 EO_{338}	—	March 11, 2005	Mount Lemmon	Mount Lemmon Survey	·	450 m	MPC · JPL
848886	2005 EB_{339}	—	June 14, 2015	Mount Lemmon	Mount Lemmon Survey	·	460 m	MPC · JPL
848887	2005 EM_{339}	—	August 28, 2006	Parc National des Cévennes	Observatoire des Pises	·	830 m	MPC · JPL
848888	2005 EA_{340}	—	January 16, 2015	Haleakala	Pan-STARRS 1	·	480 m	MPC · JPL
848889	2005 EA_{341}	—	March 2, 2012	Mount Lemmon	Mount Lemmon Survey	·	470 m	MPC · JPL
848890	2005 EF_{341}	—	June 20, 2013	Haleakala	Pan-STARRS 1	·	2.4 km	MPC · JPL
848891	2005 EE_{343}	—	October 8, 2007	Mount Lemmon	Mount Lemmon Survey	MAS	430 m	MPC · JPL
848892	2005 EN_{343}	—	October 27, 2008	Kitt Peak	Spacewatch	·	1.8 km	MPC · JPL
848893	2005 EQ_{343}	—	January 5, 2013	Mount Lemmon	Mount Lemmon Survey	·	1.0 km	MPC · JPL
848894	2005 EL_{344}	—	September 27, 2008	Mount Lemmon	Mount Lemmon Survey	·	2.1 km	MPC · JPL
848895	2005 EP_{344}	—	March 4, 2005	Kitt Peak	Spacewatch	·	1.4 km	MPC · JPL
848896	2005 ED_{346}	—	November 20, 2014	Haleakala	Pan-STARRS 1	·	2.0 km	MPC · JPL
848897	2005 EJ_{346}	—	March 11, 2005	Mount Lemmon	Mount Lemmon Survey	·	880 m	MPC · JPL
848898	2005 EY_{347}	—	November 17, 2017	Haleakala	Pan-STARRS 1	·	1.5 km	MPC · JPL
848899	2005 EL_{348}	—	March 11, 2005	Kitt Peak	Spacewatch	NYS	850 m	MPC · JPL
848900	2005 EB_{349}	—	March 4, 2005	Mount Lemmon	Mount Lemmon Survey	·	760 m	MPC · JPL

== 848901–849000 ==
back to top

Designation			Discovery			Properties		Ref
Permanent	Provisional	Named after	Date	Site	Discoverer(s)	Category	Diam.	Ref
848901	2005 EM_{349}	—	March 12, 2005	Kitt Peak	Spacewatch	·	1.2 km	MPC · JPL
848902	2005 ET_{349}	—	March 13, 2005	Mount Lemmon	Mount Lemmon Survey	·	1.9 km	MPC · JPL
848903	2005 EX_{349}	—	March 10, 2005	Mount Lemmon	Mount Lemmon Survey	·	1.5 km	MPC · JPL
848904	2005 EE_{350}	—	March 4, 2005	Mount Lemmon	Mount Lemmon Survey	(1547)	1.2 km	MPC · JPL
848905	2005 EG_{351}	—	March 8, 2005	Mount Lemmon	Mount Lemmon Survey	·	1.3 km	MPC · JPL
848906	2005 FN_{2}	—	March 10, 2005	Catalina	CSS	BAR	1.2 km	MPC · JPL
848907	2005 FT_{2}	—	March 18, 2005	Catalina	CSS	·	350 m	MPC · JPL
848908	2005 FY_{15}	—	March 16, 2005	Mount Lemmon	Mount Lemmon Survey	·	980 m	MPC · JPL
848909	2005 FR_{17}	—	March 17, 2005	Mount Lemmon	Mount Lemmon Survey	·	750 m	MPC · JPL
848910	2005 FV_{17}	—	March 16, 2005	Mount Lemmon	Mount Lemmon Survey	·	700 m	MPC · JPL
848911	2005 FS_{18}	—	March 16, 2005	Mount Lemmon	Mount Lemmon Survey	·	2.4 km	MPC · JPL
848912	2005 FU_{18}	—	March 10, 2011	Kitt Peak	Spacewatch	·	2.2 km	MPC · JPL
848913	2005 FC_{19}	—	January 7, 2016	Haleakala	Pan-STARRS 1	·	2.4 km	MPC · JPL
848914	2005 GU_{39}	—	April 4, 2005	Mount Lemmon	Mount Lemmon Survey	·	1.0 km	MPC · JPL
848915	2005 GY_{44}	—	April 5, 2005	Mount Lemmon	Mount Lemmon Survey	·	1.4 km	MPC · JPL
848916	2005 GG_{48}	—	April 5, 2005	Mount Lemmon	Mount Lemmon Survey	MAS	550 m	MPC · JPL
848917	2005 GD_{78}	—	April 6, 2005	Catalina	CSS	·	1.6 km	MPC · JPL
848918	2005 GE_{84}	—	March 8, 2005	Mount Lemmon	Mount Lemmon Survey	·	850 m	MPC · JPL
848919	2005 GA_{85}	—	April 4, 2005	Kitt Peak	Spacewatch	H	520 m	MPC · JPL
848920	2005 GR_{88}	—	April 5, 2005	Mount Lemmon	Mount Lemmon Survey	·	2.0 km	MPC · JPL
848921	2005 GY_{90}	—	April 6, 2005	Kitt Peak	Spacewatch	·	1.5 km	MPC · JPL
848922	2005 GR_{102}	—	April 9, 2005	Mount Lemmon	Mount Lemmon Survey	·	460 m	MPC · JPL
848923	2005 GA_{105}	—	April 10, 2005	Kitt Peak	Spacewatch	·	2.3 km	MPC · JPL
848924	2005 GO_{131}	—	April 10, 2005	Kitt Peak	Spacewatch	·	840 m	MPC · JPL
848925	2005 GF_{145}	—	March 11, 2005	Mount Lemmon	Mount Lemmon Survey	·	1.0 km	MPC · JPL
848926	2005 GT_{147}	—	April 11, 2005	Kitt Peak	Spacewatch	·	490 m	MPC · JPL
848927	2005 GJ_{167}	—	April 11, 2005	Mount Lemmon	Mount Lemmon Survey	·	2.1 km	MPC · JPL
848928	2005 GZ_{183}	—	April 10, 2005	Kitt Peak	Deep Ecliptic Survey	·	950 m	MPC · JPL
848929	2005 GW_{185}	—	April 10, 2005	Kitt Peak	Deep Ecliptic Survey	AGN	740 m	MPC · JPL
848930	2005 GC_{191}	—	March 4, 2005	Kitt Peak	Spacewatch	·	840 m	MPC · JPL
848931	2005 GV_{192}	—	April 10, 2005	Kitt Peak	Deep Ecliptic Survey	L5	6.3 km	MPC · JPL
848932	2005 GW_{192}	—	April 10, 2005	Kitt Peak	Deep Ecliptic Survey	AEO	770 m	MPC · JPL
848933	2005 GC_{199}	—	April 10, 2005	Kitt Peak	Deep Ecliptic Survey	·	770 m	MPC · JPL
848934	2005 GT_{211}	—	April 7, 2005	Kitt Peak	Spacewatch	·	710 m	MPC · JPL
848935	2005 GO_{219}	—	April 2, 2005	Kitt Peak	Spacewatch	·	920 m	MPC · JPL
848936	2005 GK_{233}	—	October 24, 2013	Kitt Peak	Spacewatch	·	480 m	MPC · JPL
848937	2005 GZ_{236}	—	August 2, 2016	Haleakala	Pan-STARRS 1	·	560 m	MPC · JPL
848938	2005 GN_{238}	—	June 28, 2014	Haleakala	Pan-STARRS 1	·	1.0 km	MPC · JPL
848939	2005 GM_{241}	—	April 6, 2005	Mount Lemmon	Mount Lemmon Survey	·	1.0 km	MPC · JPL
848940	2005 GS_{241}	—	April 12, 2005	Kitt Peak	Deep Ecliptic Survey	·	440 m	MPC · JPL
848941	2005 HO_{11}	—	September 26, 2006	Mount Lemmon	Mount Lemmon Survey	JUN	710 m	MPC · JPL
848942	2005 HV_{11}	—	April 19, 2012	Mount Lemmon	Mount Lemmon Survey	·	500 m	MPC · JPL
848943	2005 JS_{5}	—	May 4, 2005	Mauna Kea	Veillet, C.	·	2.1 km	MPC · JPL
848944	2005 JT_{9}	—	May 4, 2005	Mauna Kea	Veillet, C.	·	1.2 km	MPC · JPL
848945	2005 JB_{10}	—	May 4, 2005	Mauna Kea	Veillet, C.	·	620 m	MPC · JPL
848946	2005 JX_{11}	—	May 4, 2005	Mauna Kea	Veillet, C.	·	390 m	MPC · JPL
848947	2005 JY_{12}	—	May 4, 2005	Mauna Kea	Veillet, C.	MAS	420 m	MPC · JPL
848948	2005 JA_{30}	—	May 3, 2005	Kitt Peak	Spacewatch	·	1.5 km	MPC · JPL
848949	2005 JB_{36}	—	May 4, 2005	Kitt Peak	Spacewatch	·	730 m	MPC · JPL
848950	2005 JT_{37}	—	March 12, 2005	Kitt Peak	Spacewatch	DOR	1.5 km	MPC · JPL
848951	2005 JS_{43}	—	May 4, 2005	Palomar	NEAT	·	750 m	MPC · JPL
848952	2005 JJ_{72}	—	May 8, 2005	Kitt Peak	Spacewatch	·	340 m	MPC · JPL
848953	2005 JT_{81}	—	May 11, 2005	Palomar	NEAT	AMO	340 m	MPC · JPL
848954	2005 JE_{87}	—	April 9, 2005	Anderson Mesa	LONEOS	·	1.4 km	MPC · JPL
848955	2005 JL_{88}	—	May 10, 2005	Mount Lemmon	Mount Lemmon Survey	MAS	530 m	MPC · JPL
848956	2005 JN_{105}	—	May 11, 2005	Mount Lemmon	Mount Lemmon Survey	·	760 m	MPC · JPL
848957	2005 JX_{123}	—	April 14, 2005	Kitt Peak	Spacewatch	·	2.2 km	MPC · JPL
848958	2005 JO_{124}	—	May 11, 2005	Kitt Peak	Spacewatch	·	590 m	MPC · JPL
848959	2005 JJ_{141}	—	May 14, 2005	Mount Lemmon	Mount Lemmon Survey	·	460 m	MPC · JPL
848960	2005 JT_{146}	—	May 14, 2005	Kitt Peak	Spacewatch	·	1.6 km	MPC · JPL
848961	2005 JK_{149}	—	May 3, 2005	Kitt Peak	Spacewatch	NYS	710 m	MPC · JPL
848962	2005 JN_{164}	—	April 17, 2005	Kitt Peak	Spacewatch	·	2.3 km	MPC · JPL
848963	2005 JT_{166}	—	May 11, 2005	Palomar	NEAT	·	750 m	MPC · JPL
848964	2005 JJ_{172}	—	May 10, 2005	Cerro Tololo	Deep Ecliptic Survey	KOR	1.0 km	MPC · JPL
848965	2005 JM_{189}	—	January 19, 2008	Kitt Peak	Spacewatch	·	790 m	MPC · JPL
848966	2005 JS_{189}	—	March 16, 2012	Mount Lemmon	Mount Lemmon Survey	·	850 m	MPC · JPL
848967	2005 JD_{190}	—	March 4, 2016	Haleakala	Pan-STARRS 1	H	330 m	MPC · JPL
848968	2005 JU_{191}	—	August 28, 2009	Kitt Peak	Spacewatch	·	470 m	MPC · JPL
848969	2005 JB_{192}	—	February 26, 2012	Kitt Peak	Spacewatch	·	560 m	MPC · JPL
848970	2005 JO_{192}	—	August 25, 2014	Haleakala	Pan-STARRS 1	·	1.2 km	MPC · JPL
848971	2005 JW_{194}	—	May 13, 2005	Kitt Peak	Spacewatch	PHO	560 m	MPC · JPL
848972	2005 KB_{16}	—	November 27, 2013	Haleakala	Pan-STARRS 1	·	2.3 km	MPC · JPL
848973	2005 LQ_{3}	—	June 2, 2005	Siding Spring	SSS	·	1.0 km	MPC · JPL
848974	2005 LV_{7}	—	June 5, 2005	Siding Spring	SSS	AMO	610 m	MPC · JPL
848975	2005 LR_{40}	—	June 14, 2005	Kitt Peak	Spacewatch	·	660 m	MPC · JPL
848976	2005 LP_{55}	—	April 1, 2016	Haleakala	Pan-STARRS 1	HYG	2.0 km	MPC · JPL
848977	2005 LA_{56}	—	June 18, 2013	Haleakala	Pan-STARRS 1	H	370 m	MPC · JPL
848978	2005 LH_{57}	—	May 16, 2005	Mount Lemmon	Mount Lemmon Survey	·	480 m	MPC · JPL
848979	2005 LL_{58}	—	June 14, 2005	Kitt Peak	Spacewatch	·	1.1 km	MPC · JPL
848980	2005 LE_{59}	—	June 4, 2005	Kitt Peak	Spacewatch	·	1.7 km	MPC · JPL
848981	2005 LH_{59}	—	February 27, 2015	Haleakala	Pan-STARRS 1	THM	1.4 km	MPC · JPL
848982	2005 ME_{51}	—	June 11, 2005	Kitt Peak	Spacewatch	·	2.1 km	MPC · JPL
848983	2005 MK_{56}	—	June 18, 2005	Mount Lemmon	Mount Lemmon Survey	T_{j} (2.96) · 3:2	4.5 km	MPC · JPL
848984	2005 MX_{56}	—	June 18, 2005	Mount Lemmon	Mount Lemmon Survey	·	490 m	MPC · JPL
848985	2005 NJ_{2}	—	July 2, 2005	Kitt Peak	Spacewatch	·	570 m	MPC · JPL
848986	2005 NV_{25}	—	July 4, 2005	Kitt Peak	Spacewatch	·	720 m	MPC · JPL
848987	2005 NZ_{34}	—	July 5, 2005	Kitt Peak	Spacewatch	·	1.4 km	MPC · JPL
848988	2005 NF_{37}	—	June 17, 2005	Mount Lemmon	Mount Lemmon Survey	·	580 m	MPC · JPL
848989	2005 NF_{43}	—	June 18, 2005	Mount Lemmon	Mount Lemmon Survey	·	440 m	MPC · JPL
848990	2005 NU_{51}	—	June 18, 2005	Mount Lemmon	Mount Lemmon Survey	·	1.4 km	MPC · JPL
848991	2005 NY_{52}	—	July 10, 2005	Kitt Peak	Spacewatch	·	2.2 km	MPC · JPL
848992	2005 NT_{53}	—	July 10, 2005	Kitt Peak	Spacewatch	NYS	710 m	MPC · JPL
848993	2005 NK_{61}	—	July 5, 2005	Palomar	NEAT	T_{j} (2.84)	2.5 km	MPC · JPL
848994	2005 NE_{62}	—	July 11, 2005	Kitt Peak	Spacewatch	·	670 m	MPC · JPL
848995	2005 NS_{77}	—	July 1, 2005	Kitt Peak	Spacewatch	·	630 m	MPC · JPL
848996	2005 NY_{88}	—	July 4, 2005	Mount Lemmon	Mount Lemmon Survey	·	670 m	MPC · JPL
848997	2005 NL_{89}	—	July 4, 2005	Mount Lemmon	Mount Lemmon Survey	·	430 m	MPC · JPL
848998	2005 NL_{104}	—	July 7, 2005	Mauna Kea	Veillet, C.	·	1.5 km	MPC · JPL
848999	2005 NV_{106}	—	July 3, 2005	Mount Lemmon	Mount Lemmon Survey	V	480 m	MPC · JPL
849000	2005 NP_{110}	—	July 15, 2005	Kitt Peak	Spacewatch	·	760 m	MPC · JPL

back to top
