= Comet Levy =

Comet Levy or Levy's Comet may refer to any of the six comets discovered by Canadian astronomer, David H. Levy, below:

- 255P/Levy
- C/1987 A1 (Levy)
- C/1987 T1 (Levy)
- C/1988 F1 (Levy)
- C/1990 K1 (Levy)
- C/1991 L3 (Levy)

It may also be a partial reference to 14 other comets he co-discovered with other astronomers:

- Comet Levy–Rudenko
  - C/1984 V1 (Levy–Rudenko)
- Comet Okazaki–Levy–Rudenko
  - C/1989 Q1 (Okazaki–Levy–Rudenko)
- Comet Shoemaker–Levy
  - 118P/Shoemaker–Levy 4
  - 129P/Shoemaker–Levy 3
  - 135P/Shoemaker–Levy 8
  - 137P/Shoemaker–Levy 2
  - 138P/Shoemaker–Levy 7
  - 145P/Shoemaker–Levy 5
  - 181P/Shoemaker–Levy 6
  - 192P/Shoemaker–Levy 1
  - C/1991 B1 (Shoemaker–Levy)
  - C/1991 T2 (Shoemaker–Levy)
  - D/1993 F2 (Shoemaker–Levy) 9
  - C/1993 K1 (Shoemaker–Levy)
  - C/1994 E2 (Shoemaker–Levy)
- Comet Takamizawa–Levy
  - C/1994 G1 (Takamizawa–Levy)
