= Comet Shoemaker =

Comet Shoemaker or Shoemaker's Comet may refer to any of the 13 comets discovered by American astronomers, Carolyn and Eugene Shoemaker, below:

- 102P/Shoemaker 1
- 155P/Shoemaker 3
- 199P/Shoemaker 4
- C/1983 R1 (Shoemaker)
- C/1984 K1 (Shoemaker)
- C/1984 U1 (Shoemaker)
- C/1984 U2 (Shoemaker)
- C/1986 E1 (Shoemaker)
- C/1987 H1 (Shoemaker)
- C/1988 B1 (Shoemaker)
- C/1989 A5 (Shoemaker)
- C/1989 A6 (Shoemaker)
- C/1992 U1 (Shoemaker)

It may also be a partial reference to 19 other comets they have co-discovered with other astronomers:

- Comet Jensen–Shoemaker
  - C/1987 W3 (Jensen–Shoemaker)
- Comet Shoemaker–Holt
  - 121P/Shoemaker–Holt 2
  - 128P/Shoemaker–Holt 1
  - C/1988 J1 (Shoemaker–Holt)
- Comet Shoemaker–Holt–Rodriguez
  - C/1988 L1 (Shoemaker–Holt–Rodriguez)
- Comet Shoemaker–Levy
  - 118P/Shoemaker–Levy 4
  - 129P/Shoemaker–Levy 3
  - 135P/Shoemaker–Levy 8
  - 137P/Shoemaker–Levy 2
  - 138P/Shoemaker–Levy 7
  - 145P/Shoemaker–Levy 5
  - 181P/Shoemaker–Levy 6
  - 192P/Shoemaker–Levy 1
  - C/1991 B1 (Shoemaker–Levy)
  - C/1991 T2 (Shoemaker–Levy)
  - D/1993 F2 (Shoemaker–Levy) 9
  - C/1993 K1 (Shoemaker–Levy)
  - C/1994 E2 (Shoemaker–Levy)
- Comet Shoemaker–LINEAR
  - 146P/Shoemaker–LINEAR
