= Comet Hartley =

Comet Hartley is the name of ten comets discovered by Malcolm Hartley:

- 79P/du Toit–Hartley
- 80P/Peters–Hartley
- 100P/Hartley or Hartley 1
- 103P/Hartley or Hartley 2
- 110P/Hartley or Hartley 3
- 119P/Parker–Hartley
- 161P/Hartley–IRAS
- 318P/McNaught–Hartley
- C/1984 W2 (Hartley)
- C/1985 R1 (Hartley–Good)
- X/1987 A2 (McNaught–Hartley), later rediscovered as 449P/Leonard
- C/1995 Q2 (Hartley–Drinkwater)
- C/1999 T1 (McNaught–Hartley)

== See also ==
- Hartley (disambiguation)
