= 119P/Parker–Hartley =

Jupiter-family comet

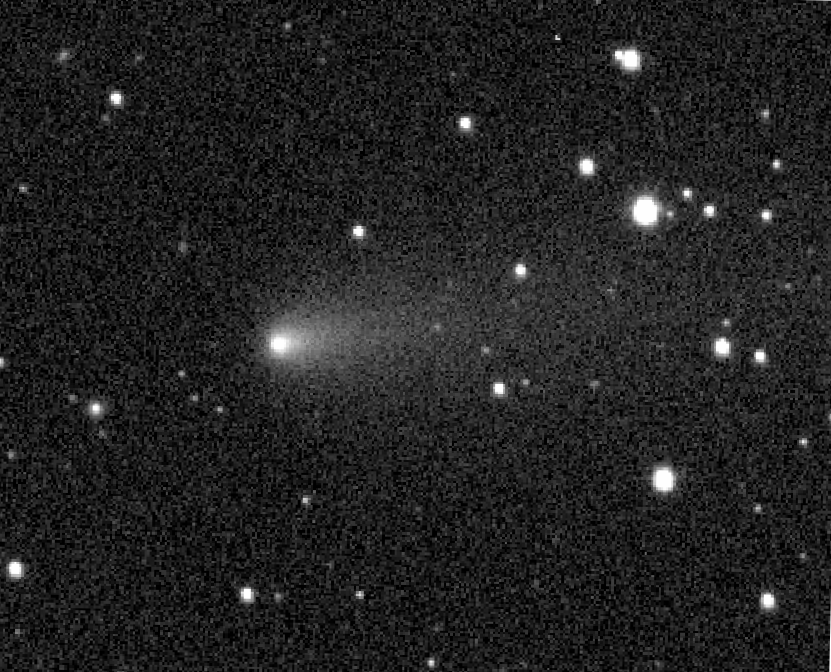
- Comet Parker–Hartley imaged from the Zwicky Transient Facility on 22 December 2022

Discovery
- Discovered by: Quentin A. Parker; Malcolm Hartley
- Discovery site: Siding Spring Observatory
- Discovery date: 2 March 1989

Designations
- MPC designation: P/1986 TF; P/1989 E1, P/1995 M2
- Alternative designations: 1987 XXXVI, 1989i

Orbital characteristics
- Epoch: 21 November 2025 (JD 2461000.5)
- Observation arc: 37.60 years
- Earliest precovery date: 29 September 1986
- Number of observations: 3,334
- Aphelion: 5.288 AU
- Perihelion: 2.332 AU
- Semi-major axis: 3.810 AU
- Eccentricity: 0.38797
- Orbital period: 7.437 years
- Inclination: 7.393°
- Longitude of ascending node: 104.54°
- Argument of periapsis: 322.29°
- Mean anomaly: 158.57°
- Last perihelion: 11 August 2022
- Next perihelion: 20 November 2030
- T_{Jupiter}: 2.940
- Earth MOID: 2.037 AU
- Jupiter MOID: 0.209 AU

Physical characteristics
- Mean radius: 1.83 km (1.14 mi)
- Mean density: 510±80 kg/m^{3}
- Comet total magnitude (M1): 9.6
- Comet nuclear magnitude (M2): 13.9

119P/Parker–Hartley is a Jupiter-family comet with a 7.44-year orbit around the Sun. It is co-discovered by two astronomers, Quentin A. Parker and Malcolm Hartley. (Note: This is Quentin Parker's only comet discovery, and also one of ten comets discovered and co-discovered by Malcolm Hartley)

== Observational history ==
Robert H. McNaught reported the discovery of a comet on a photographic plate taken by Quentin A. Parker and Malcolm Hartley using the Siding Spring Observatory's 1.2-m UK Schmidt Telescope on 2 March 1989. At the time of discovery, the comet was a diffuse 16th-magnitude object within the constellation Aries. (Note: Reported initial position upon discovery was: α = 10^{h} 43.3^{m} , δ = 0° 45′) Additional observations, including a precovery image from 11 February 1989 that showed a diffuse trail, allowed astronomers to determine that Parker–Hartley is a periodic comet that has reached perihelion nearly two years prior.

Further investigation revealed that the comet was actually discovered as early as 1986, when it was initially identified as an asteroid called 1986 TF, where it was first spotted by Poul B. Jensen and Antonin Mrkos from August to October 1986. Jensen reported that on his reanalysis of the 1986 plates he took from the Brorfelde Observatory, it was a slightly diffuse object relative to other minor planets, albeit without central condensation. While initially contradicted by the observations made by Antonin Mrkos at the Klet' Observatory where there's no reported activity, reanalysis of the observatory's 1986 photographic plates in 2000 later revealed that the comet did show some weak activity at the time.

The comet was recovered on every subsequent apparition since; on 1996, 2005, 2014 and 2022, respectively. It is expected to return by 2030.

== Physical characteristics ==
Observations from the Hubble Space Telescope in 2005 revealed that the nucleus of Comet Parker–Hartley is about 3.66 km (2.27 mi) in diameter.

== Orbit ==
As of 2025, Comet Parker–Hartley is in a heliocentric orbit that takes about 7.437 years to complete, with a perihelion distance about 2.33 AU (349 million km; 217 million mi) from the Sun, inclined about 7.4 degrees to the ecliptic. Its orbit also allowed Shuichi Nakano to classify the comet as a quasi-Hilda object.

This comet makes several close approaches to Jupiter between 1984 and 2161. Prior to its discovery, Parker–Hartley flew past Jupiter at a distance of 0.15 AU (22 million km; 14 million mi) in May 1984. Around 16 March 2161, the comet will pass about 0.019 AU (2.8 million km; 1.8 million mi) from the giant planet.

== Notes ==
Numbered comets
Previous; 118P/Shoemaker–Levy	119P/Parker–Hartley	Next; 120P/Mueller
