= Comet McNaught-Hartley =

Comet Hartley is the name of two comets discovered by Robert H. McNaught and Malcolm Hartley:

- X/1987 A2 (McNaught–Hartley), later rediscovered as 449P/Leonard
- C/1999 T1 (McNaught–Hartley)

== See also ==
- Comet McNaught
- Comet Hartley
