= 110P/Hartley =

Jupiter-family comet

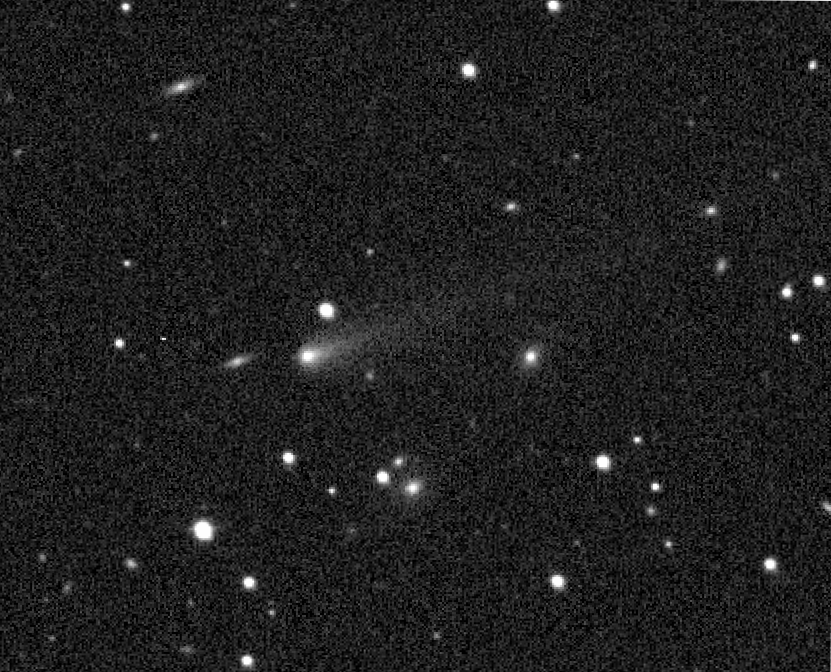
- Comet Hartley 3 imaged from the Zwicky Transient Facility on 20 November 2021

Discovery
- Discovered by: Malcolm Hartley
- Discovery site: Siding Spring Observatory (UK Schmidt Telescope)
- Discovery date: 19 February 1988

Designations
- MPC designation: P/1988 D1, P/1993 M1
- Pronunciation: /ˈhɑːrtli/
- Alternative designations: Hartley 3; 1987 XII, 1994 XII; 1988d, 1993m

Orbital characteristics
- Epoch: 25 February 2023 (JD 2460000.5)
- Observation arc: 38.48 years (Note: Observation arc from the Minor Planet Center database covering dates from 19 February 1988 until 14 August 2026.)
- Number of observations: 4,010
- Aphelion: 4.752 AU
- Perihelion: 2.455 AU
- Semi-major axis: 3.604 AU
- Eccentricity: 0.31870
- Orbital period: 6.841 years
- Inclination: 11.705°
- Longitude of ascending node: 287.52°
- Argument of periapsis: 167.46°
- Mean anomaly: 71.255°
- Last perihelion: 18 October 2021
- Next perihelion: 28 August 2028
- T_{Jupiter}: 2.990
- Earth MOID: 1.483 AU
- Jupiter MOID: 0.478 AU

Physical characteristics
- Mean radius: 2.31 ± 0.03 km (1.435 ± 0.019 mi)
- Mean density: 530±70 kg/m^{3}
- Synodic rotation period: 10.153±0.001 hours
- Spectral type: (V–R) = 0.67±0.09
- Comet total magnitude (M1): 4.3
- Comet nuclear magnitude (M2): 13.3

Comet Hartley 3 is a periodic comet with a six-year orbit around the Sun. It is one of ten comets discovered by Australian astronomer, Malcolm Hartley.

== Observational history ==
=== Discovery ===
The comet appeared as a weak trail at magnitude 16.5 on the edge of its discovery plates, which were taken from the UK Schmidt Telescope of the Siding Spring Observatory. By 22 February, Hartley confirmed his discovery using the same telescope, and found a tail about 10 arcminutes in length. From the Palomar Observatory, both Carolyn and Eugene Shoemaker found two precovery images of the comet about 4.8 hours before its official discovery. By then, it was determined that Hartley's find is definitely a short-period comet.

=== Follow-up observations ===
Six observatories around the globe made observations of Hartley 3 in March 1988, including those made by Tsutomu Seki, Robert H. McNaught, James V. Scotti, and David H. Levy. By April 1988, revised orbital calculations by Brian G. Marsden indicated that the comet completes an elliptical orbit once every 6.85 years.

Hartley 3 was successfully recovered by James V. Scotti using the Spacewatch telescope of the Kitt Peak Observatory on 23 June 1993.

== Physical characteristics ==
Observations by the Hubble Space Telescope in 2004 and 2011 revealed that the effective radius of its nucleus is around 2.15±0.04 km and a rotation period of 9.4±1.0 hours. Later ground observations from Pan-STARRS and other sky surveys revised the radius and rotation periods to 2.31±0.03 km and 10.153±0.001 hours, respectively.

== Bibliography ==
- Kronk, Gary W.; Meyer, Maik; Seargent, David A. J. (2017). Cometography: A Catalog of Comets. Vol. 6: 1983–1993. Cambridge University Press. ISBN 978-0-521-87216-4.

Numbered comets
Previous; 109P/Swift–Tuttle	110P/Hartley	Next; 111P/Helin–Roman–Crockett
