= 100P/Hartley =

Jupiter-family comet

Discovery
- Discovered by: Malcolm Hartley
- Discovery site: UK Schmidt Telescope
- Discovery date: 13 June 1985

Designations
- MPC designation: P/1985 L1; P/1991 E1
- Pronunciation: /ˈhɑːrtli/
- Alternative designations: Hartley 1; 1985 VII, 1991 VII; 1985f, 1991j

Orbital characteristics
- Epoch: 13 September 2023 (JD 2460200.5)
- Observation arc: 37.17 years (Note: Observation arc from the Minor Planet Center database covering dates from 13 June 1985 until 15 August 2022.)
- Number of observations: 666
- Aphelion: 4.844 AU
- Perihelion: 2.018 AU
- Semi-major axis: 3.416 AU
- Eccentricity: 0.41183
- Orbital period: 6.354 years
- Inclination: 25.567°
- Longitude of ascending node: 37.687°
- Argument of periapsis: 181.96°
- Mean anomaly: 67.750°
- Last perihelion: 10 August 2022
- Next perihelion: 15 December 2028
- T_{Jupiter}: 2.851
- Earth MOID: 1.003 AU
- Jupiter MOID: 0.133 AU

Physical characteristics
- Mean radius: < 1.2 km (0.75 mi)
- Comet total magnitude (M1): 10.0
- Comet nuclear magnitude (M2): 16.2

Comet Hartley 1, also known as 100P/Hartley, is a Jupiter family comet with a 6.35-year orbit around the Sun. It is one of 12 comets discovered by Australian astronomer, Malcolm Hartley.

On 29 April 2164, the comet will pass 0.487 AU (72.9 million km; 45.3 million mi) from Earth.

== Observational history ==
=== Discovery ===
Malcolm Hartley discovered the comet from CCD images taken from the UK Schmidt Telescope in Australia on 13 June 1985. At the time, the comet was a 16th-magnitude object within the constellation Virgo, (Note: Reported initial position upon discovery was: α = 11^{h} 48^{m} , δ = 4° 21′) with a prominent tail extending about 1 arcminute towards the southeast. Despite the discovery announcement, Hartley remained the comet's only observer for the next three weeks.

=== Follow-up observations ===
An additional observation by Hartley on 10 July 1985 has allowed Brian G. Marsden to compute the elliptical orbit of the comet for the first time, revealing that it was a short-period comet with a 5.66-year orbit around the Sun. James B. Gibson obtained the only known Northern hemisphere observations of the comet during its first apparition on 27–29 July 1985. It was last detected by Alan C. Gilmore on 14 August 1985.

The small number of observations during its 1985 apparition has caused uncertainties in revising its orbit that it was almost considered lost. It was successfully recovered by David H. Levy, Carolyn and Eugene Shoemaker on the night of 12 March 1991, about 16 degrees from its predicted position. Marsden later noted that the comet made a close encounter with Jupiter in February 1988, passing within 0.36 AU (54 million km) from the giant planet.

== Bibliography ==
- Kronk, Gary W.; Meyer, Maik; Seargent, David A. J. (2017). Cometography: A Catalog of Comets. Vol. 6: 1983–1993. Cambridge University Press. ISBN 978-0-521-87216-4.

Numbered comets
Previous; 99P/Kowal	100P/Hartley	Next; 101P/Chernykh
