= 13123 Tyson =

Asteroid

Discovery
- Discovered by: C. Shoemaker; D. H. Levy
- Discovery site: Palomar Obs.
- Discovery date: 16 May 1994

Designations
- Named after: Neil deGrasse Tyson (American astrophysicist)
- Alternative designations: 1994 KA · 1995 YO_{2}
- Minor planet category: main-belt · Phocaea

Orbital characteristics
- Epoch 4 September 2017 (JD 2458000.5)
- Uncertainty parameter 0
- Observation arc: 63.78 yr (23,297 days)
- Aphelion: 2.9996 AU
- Perihelion: 1.7201 AU
- Semi-major axis: 2.3598 AU
- Eccentricity: 0.2711
- Orbital period (sidereal): 3.63 yr (1,324 days)
- Mean anomaly: 78.622°
- Mean motion: 0° 16^{m} 18.84^{s} / day
- Inclination: 23.289°
- Longitude of ascending node: 68.802°
- Argument of perihelion: 252.04°
- Known satellites: 1 (Note: Pravec (2015/16): lightcurve plot of (13123) Tyson with a rotation period of 3.3303±0.0002 hours and a brightness amplitude of 0.20 mag at H= 12.19±0.09 (R) and an assigned quality code of U=3. It is an unconfirmed binary asteroid, that lacks mutual eclipse/occultation events. Two periods were derived: 3.3302 (primary, first plot) and 3.862 hours (satellite, second lightcurve plot), with an amplitude of 0.2 and 0.04 mag. Summary figures at Collaborative Asteroid Lightcurve Link (CALL), also see Pravec, P.; Wolf, M.; Sarounova, L. (2015), and 2016-publication)

Physical characteristics
- Dimensions: 8.22 km (calculated); 10.87±0.61 km
- Synodic rotation period: 3.329±0.001 h 3.3303±0.0002 h
- Geometric albedo: 0.197±0.025; 0.23 (assumed)
- Spectral type: S
- Absolute magnitude (H): 12.19±0.09 (R) · 12.20 · 12.3 · 12.41±0.41 · 12.64

13123 Tyson, provisional designation 1994 KA, is a stony Phocaea asteroid and an asynchronous binary system from the inner regions of the asteroid belt, approximately 10 kilometers in diameter. It was discovered on May 16, 1994, by American astronomer Carolyn Shoemaker and Canadian astronomer David Levy at the Palomar Observatory in California, United States. The asteroid was named for Neil deGrasse Tyson, American astrophysicist and popular science communicator.

== Orbit and classification ==
The stony S-type asteroid is a member of the Phocaea family (701), a rather small group of asteroids with similar orbital characteristics, named after its largest member, 25 Phocaea. It orbits the Sun in the inner main-belt at a distance of 1.7–3.0 AU once every 3 years and 8 months (1,324 days). Its orbit has an eccentricity of 0.27 and an inclination of 23° with respect to the ecliptic. The first precovery was taken at Palomar's Digitized Sky Survey (DSS) in 1953, extending the asteroid's observation arc by 41 years prior to its discovery.

== Physical characteristics ==
=== Rotation period ===
In February 2015, a rotational lightcurve was obtained by astronomer Petr Pravec at the Astronomical Institute, Czech Republic. It showed a well-defined rotation period of 3.3303 hours with a brightness amplitude of 0.20 in magnitude (U=3). A previous photometric observation in August 2009, at the Oakley Southern Sky Observatory, Australia, gave a lightcurve with a similar period of 3.329 hours and a brightness variation of 0.35 magnitude (U=3-).

=== Satellite ===
Tyson is an asynchronous binary asteroid with a minor planet moon. The satellite has a rotation period of 3.862 hours. No other physical properties for this binary system has been published.

=== Diameter and albedo ===
According to the survey carried out by NASA's space-based Wide-field Infrared Survey Explorer with its subsequent NEOWISE mission, the asteroid measures 10.9 kilometers in diameter and its surface has an albedo of 0.197, while the Collaborative Asteroid Lightcurve Link assumes an albedo of 0.23 and calculates a smaller diameter of 8.2 kilometers with an absolute magnitude of 12.64.

== Naming ==
This minor planet was named in honor of American astrophysicist and popular science communicator, Neil deGrasse Tyson (born 1958). In 1996, he became director of New York's Hayden Planetarium and was the chief scientist for its complete renovation. At the time, Tyson was also a research affiliate at Princeton University. The official naming citation was published by the Minor Planet Center on 11 November 2000 (M.P.C. 41572).
