= NGC 393 =

Lenticular galaxy in constellation Andromeda

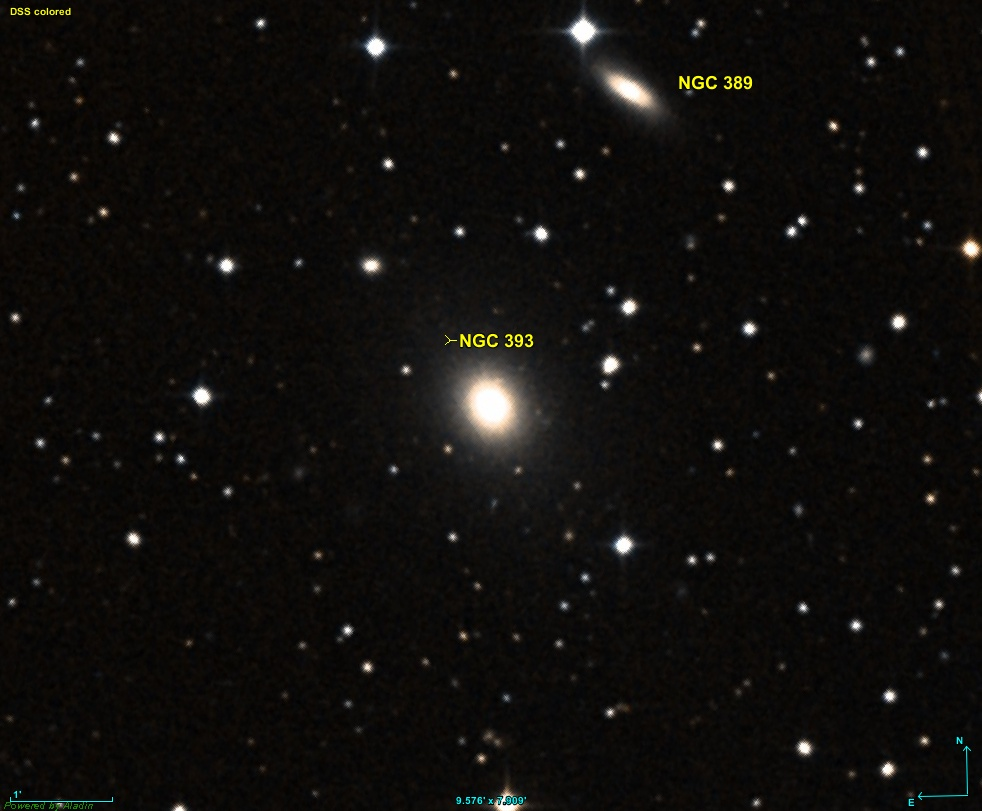
- NGC 393 (DSS)

Observation data (J2000 epoch)
- Constellation: Andromeda
- Right ascension: 01^{h} 08^{m} 36.9^{s}
- Declination: +39° 38′ 40″
- Redshift: 0.020354
- Heliocentric radial velocity: 6,102 km/s
- Apparent magnitude (V): 13.6

Characteristics
- Type: S0^{−}:
- Apparent size (V): 1.7' × 1.4'

Other designations
- UGC 00707, CGCG 520-018, MCG +06-03-015, 2MASX J01083695+3938396, 2MASXi J0108369+393836, PGC 4061.

NGC 393 is a lenticular galaxy located in the constellation Andromeda. It was discovered on October 5, 1784, by William Herschel. It was described by Dreyer as "faint, very small, very little extended, gradually brighter middle, four small (faint) stars near."
