= 80P/Peters–Hartley =

Jupiter-family comet

Discovery
- Discovered by: Christian H. F. Peters; Malcolm Hartley
- Discovery site: Capodimonte Observatory, Italy
- Discovery date: 26 June 1846; 11 July 1982

Designations
- MPC designation: P/1846 M1; P/1982 N1
- Alternative designations: 1846 VI, 1982 III, 1990 IX; 1982h, 1990d

Orbital characteristics
- Epoch: 21 November 2025 (JD 2461000.5)
- Observation arc: 177.15 years (Note: Observation arc from the Minor Planet Center database only covered dates from 11 July 1982 until 21 August 2023 (41.11 years). This figure includes its entire arc up to 26 June 1846.)
- Number of observations: 186
- Aphelion: 6.424 AU
- Perihelion: 1.618 AU
- Semi-major axis: 4.021 AU
- Eccentricity: 0.59769
- Orbital period: 8.063 years
- Inclination: 29.928°
- Longitude of ascending node: 259.77°
- Argument of periapsis: 339.26°
- Mean anomaly: 131.89°
- Last perihelion: 8 December 2022
- Next perihelion: 28 December 2030
- T_{Jupiter}: 2.513
- Earth MOID: 0.619 AU
- Jupiter MOID: 0.454 AU

Physical characteristics
- Mean radius: 5.22 km (3.24 mi)
- Comet total magnitude (M1): 11.8

80P/Peters–Hartley is a Jupiter-family comet with an orbital period of 8.06 years around the Sun. It is the first of two comets discovered by German–American astronomer, Christian Heinrich Friedrich Peters, (Note: The second comet discovered by C. H. F. Peters was C/1857 O1 (Peters)) later becoming lost and subsequently recovered by Australian astronomer, Malcolm Hartley.

== Observational history ==
It was originally discovered by Christian Heinrich Friedrich Peters of Capodimonte Observatory, Naples, Italy. There was insufficient data to accurately compute the orbit, and the comet was lost for well over 136 years.

It was accidentally rediscovered by Malcolm Hartley at the UK Schmidt Telescope Unit, Siding Spring, Australia on a photographic plate exposed on 11 July 1982. He estimated its brightness at a magnitude of 15. The sighting was confirmed from the Perth Observatory, where Michael P. Candy calculated the orbit and concluded that Hartley had indeed relocated the lost Peters' Comet. Ichiro Hasegawa and Syuichi Nakano had simultaneously reached the same conclusion.

It was observed at its next apparition in 1990 by Robert H. McNaught of the Siding Spring Observatory, who described as diffuse with a brightness of magnitude 14, indicating that the comet had faded over the last 150 years. By July 1990, the comet slightly brightened to at least 11.3 in apparent magnitude.

On February 1998, observations from the Canada–France–Hawaii Telescope (CFHT) measured the brightness of the comet to an extremely faint apparent magnitude of around 20.4. It was subsequently observed on every apparition since its recovery.

== Physical characteristics ==
Infrared observations from NEOWISE and the Spitzer Space Telescope revealed that the nucleus of Comet Peters–Hartley has an upper limit of at least 10.44 km (6.49 mi) in diameter.

== Notes ==
Numbered comets
| Previous; 79P/du Toit–Hartley | 80P/Peters–Hartley | Next; 81P/Wild |
