= NGC 389 =

Lenticular galaxy in constellation Andromeda

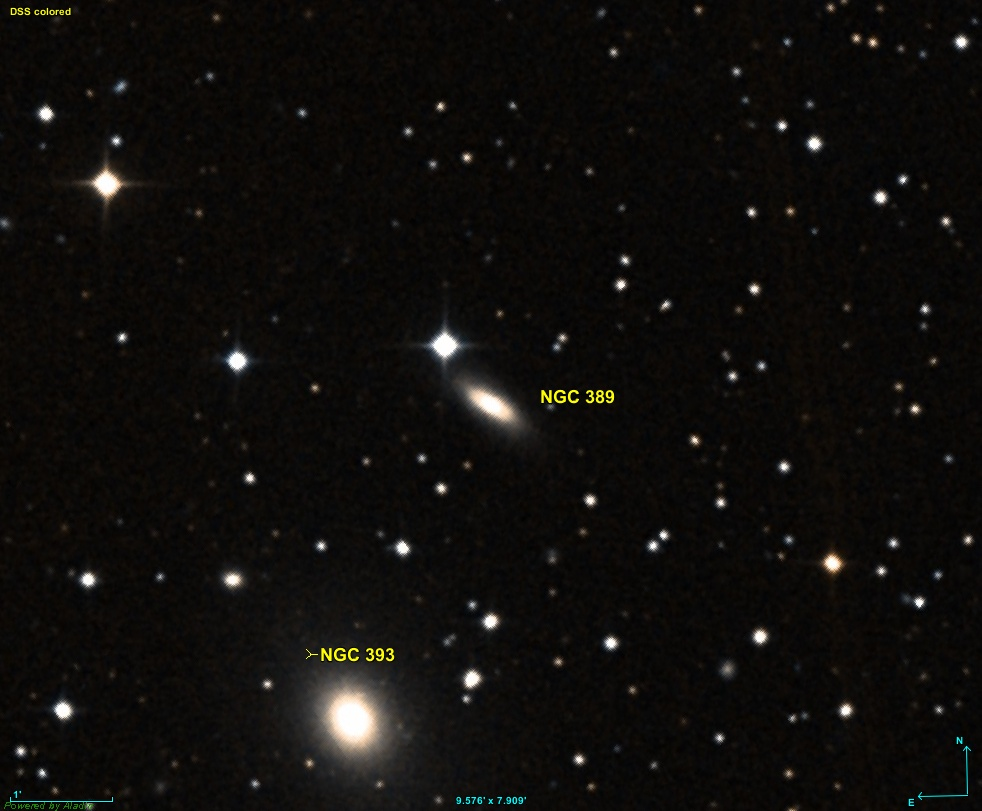
- NGC 389 as seen on DSS

Observation data (J2000 epoch)
- Constellation: Andromeda
- Right ascension: 01^{h} 08^{m} 29.9^{s}
- Declination: +39° 41′ 44″
- Redshift: 0.017819
- Heliocentric radial velocity: 5,342 km/s
- Distance: 239 Mly
- Apparent magnitude (V): 14.82

Characteristics
- Type: S0
- Apparent size (V): 1.3' × 0.4'

Other designations
- UGC 703, CGCG 520-017, MCG +06-03-014, 2MASX J01082993+3941436, 2MASXi J0108298+394140, PGC 4054.

NGC 389 is a lenticular galaxy located approximately 239 million light-years from the Solar System in the constellation Andromeda. It was discovered on September 6, 1885 by Lewis Swift. It was described by Dreyer as "extremely faint, extremely small, round, star near."

== See also ==
- Spiral galaxy
- List of NGC objects (1–1000)
- Pisces (constellation)
