= 308P/Lagerkvist–Carsenty =

Periodic comet and centaur

- Comet Lagerkvist–Carsenty imaged from ESO on 24 November 1997

Discovery
- Discovered by: Claes-Ingvar Lagerkvist; Uri Carsenty
- Discovery site: European Southern Observatory
- Discovery date: 5 October 1997

Designations
- MPC designation: P/1997 T3, P/2014 O2; P/2014 QD_{604}
- Alternative designations: PJ97T030

Orbital characteristics
- Epoch: 21 January 2022 (JD 2459600.5)
- Observation arc: 18.50 years (Note: Observation arc from the Minor Planet Center database covering dates from 1 October 1997 until 2 April 2016.)
- Earliest precovery date: 1 October 1997
- Number of observations: 375
- Aphelion: 9.005 AU
- Perihelion: 4.199 AU
- Semi-major axis: 6.602 AU
- Eccentricity: 0.36397
- Orbital period: 16.963 years
- Inclination: 4.852°
- Longitude of ascending node: 63.063°
- Argument of periapsis: 333.60°
- Mean anomaly: 142.35°
- Last perihelion: 7 May 2015
- Next perihelion: 1 May 2032
- T_{Jupiter}: 2.883
- Earth MOID: 3.263 AU
- Jupiter MOID: 0.293 AU
- Comet total magnitude (M1): 10.7
- Comet nuclear magnitude (M2): 13.5

Comet Lagerkvist–Carsenty is a distant Jupiter-family comet with a 17-year orbit around the Sun. It was co-discovered by two European astronomers, Claes-Ingvar Lagerkvist (Note: 308P is Lagerkvist's third comet discovery after P/1996 R2 and C/1996 R3.) and Uri Carsenty.

== Observational history ==
The comet was discovered as an asteroid-like object from photographic plates taken during a joint astronomical survey between the Uppsala Astronomical Observatory and the European Southern Observatory on the night of 5 October 1997. At the time, the comet formerly known as P/1997 T3, was a 19th-magnitude object within the constellation Pisces. (Note: Reported initial position upon discovery was: α = 1^{h} 15^{m} 20.5^{s}, δ = 3° 04′ 03″) It was initially thought to be a Jupiter trojan with no apparent activity, until further orbital calculations had shown it was not gravitationally bound to Jupiter itself, but in a centaur-like orbit as far away as Saturn's distance to the Sun.

On 29 July 2014, Erwin Schwab and his colleagues at the Tenerife Observatory later recovered the comet on its second apparition as P/2014 O2, where like its 1997 apparition, it exhibited very little cometary activity.

== Orbit ==
Lagerkvist–Carsenty is currently in a heliocentric orbit whose perihelion is at a distance of 4.2 AU (630 million km) and aphelion of 9.01 AU (1.348 billion km) from the Sun. It completes one revolution roughly every 17 years, placed between the orbits of Jupiter and Saturn.

Orbital reconstructions in 2000 by the discoverers themselves had revealed that the comet made a close encounter with Saturn on 12 October 1954, where it approached the giant planet at a distance of 0.0104 AU (1.56 million km). The encounter had turned the orbit of the former centaur into that of a Jupiter-family comet in the present day. The comet will make two close encounters with Jupiter by 2085 and 2188, respectively.

== Naming ==
The comet initially did not have a formal name since it was thought to be an asteroid upon discovery. However, by January 1998, the International Astronomical Union (IAU) had decided to rename P/1997 T3 as Lagerkvist–Carsenty, after the two discoverers who recognized its cometary nature before its discovery was announced. (Note: It was one of two comets renamed by the IAU that year, the other one was C/1997 L1 (Zhu–Balam).)

The comet received its official numerical designation, 308P, in January 2017.

== See also ==
- 450P/LONEOS, another former centaur that became a short-period comet after a close encounter with Saturn

== Notes ==
Numbered comets
Previous; 307P/LINEAR	308P/Lagerkvist–Carsenty	Next; 309P/LINEAR
