= 111P/Helin–Roman–Crockett =

Encke-type comet

Discovery
- Discovered by: Eleanor F. Helin; Ron Helin; Brian P. Roman; Randy L. Crockett
- Discovery site: Palomar Observatory (675)
- Discovery date: 5 January 1989

Designations
- MPC designation: P/1989 A2
- Alternative designations: 1988 XIII, 1989b

Orbital characteristics
- Epoch: 25 February 2023 (JD 2460000.5)
- Observation arc: 23.97 years (Note: Observation arc from the Minor Planet Center database covering dates from 2 January 1989 until 21 December 2012.)
- Earliest precovery date: 2 January 1989
- Number of observations: 152
- Aphelion: 4.595 AU
- Perihelion: 3.707 AU
- Semi-major axis: 4.151 AU
- Eccentricity: 0.1402
- Orbital period: 8.457 years
- Inclination: 4.226°
- Longitude of ascending node: 89.827°
- Argument of periapsis: 1.109°
- Mean anomaly: 72.094°
- Last perihelion: 16 June 2021
- Next perihelion: 9 December 2029
- T_{Jupiter}: 3.023
- Earth MOID: 2.721 AU
- Jupiter MOID: 0.589 AU

Physical characteristics
- Mean radius: 0.6 km (0.37 mi)
- Comet total magnitude (M1): 8.4
- Comet nuclear magnitude (M2): 17.2

111P/Helin–Roman–Crockett is an Encke-type comet with an 8.46-year orbit around the Sun. It was co-discovered by Eleanor and Ron Helin, Brian P. Roman and Randy L. Crockett on 5 January 1989 from images obtained about 1-2 days prior.

== Orbit ==
Comet Helin–Roman–Crockett is known for making extremely close approaches to Jupiter being a quasi-Hilda comet. During these approaches, it actually orbits Jupiter. The last such approach was in 1976, the next will be in 2071. The Jovian orbits are highly elliptical and subject to intense Solar perturbation at apojove which eventually pulls the comet out of Jovian orbit for the cycle to begin anew.

Simulations predict such a cycle is unstable, the object will either be captured into an encounter orbit (e.g. Shoemaker-Levy 9) or expelled into a new orbit which does not have periodic approaches. This implies that 111P's orbit is recent within the past few thousand years.

== Physical characteristics ==
Estimates for the size of its nucleus in 2004 place it roughly about 1.2 km (0.75 mi) in diameter. Follow-up studies in 2007 generally agree with this estimate, and depending on the comet's activity involved, the comet is likely somewhere between 0.92–2.78 km (0.57–1.73 mi) in diameter.

== Notes ==
Numbered comets
| Previous; 110P/Hartley | 111P/Helin–Roman–Crockett | Next; 112P/Urata–Niijima |
