= NGC 1162 =

Lenticular galaxy in the constellation Eridanus

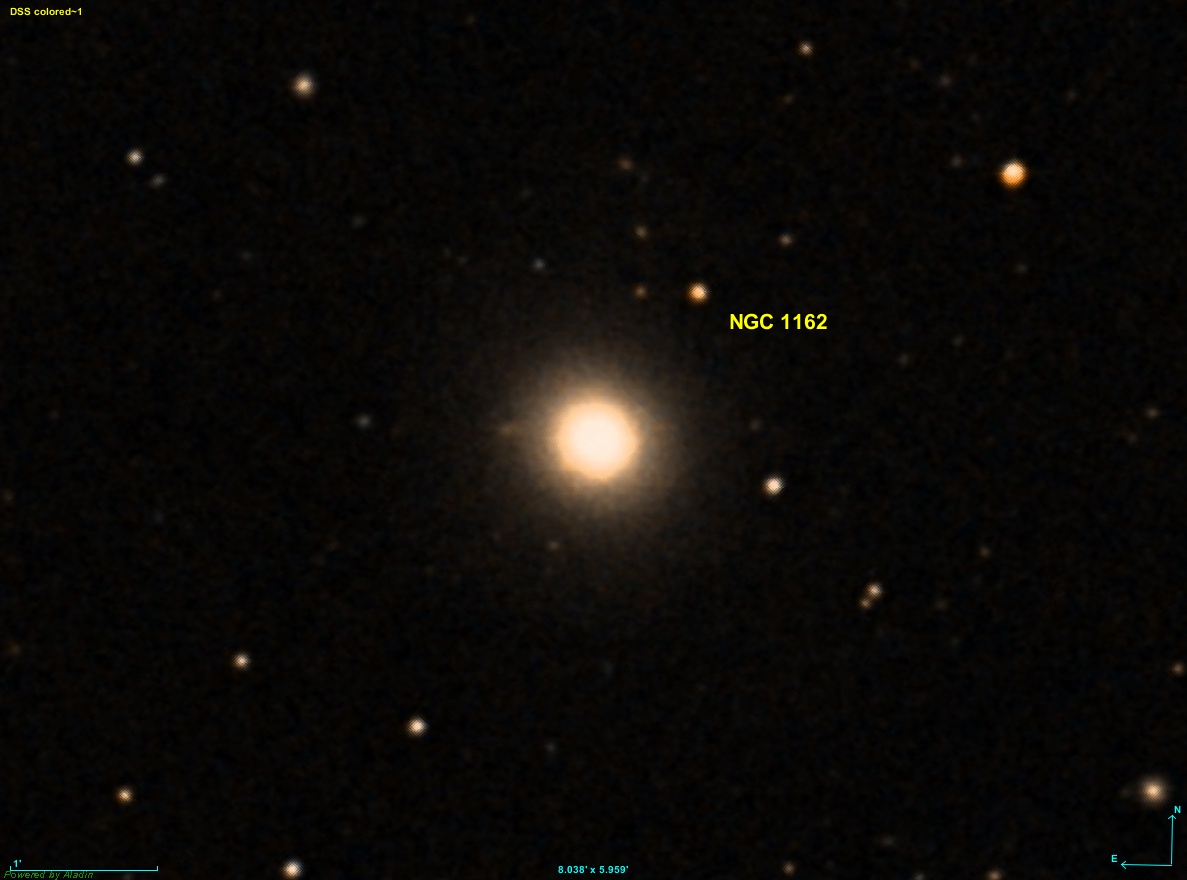
- NGC 1162 as observed by the Digitized Sky Survey

Observation data (J2000 epoch)
- Constellation: Eridanus
- Redshift: 0.013139
- Distance: 55 Mpc
- Apparent magnitude (V): ~13

Characteristics
- Type: E?
- Apparent size (V): 108.5"

Other designations
- LEDA 11274

NGC 1162 is an elliptical galaxy located in the constellation Eridanus. It was discovered by astronomer William Herschel on November 27, 1785. The galaxy lies approximately 55 million parsecs away from Earth and is classified as a type E galaxy, indicating an elliptical galaxy.

== Discovery ==
NGC 1162 was discovered by William Herschel on November 27, 1785, during his extensive sky surveys. It is included in the New General Catalogue compiled by astronomer John Louis Emil Dreyer.
