= 101P/Chernykh =

Periodic comet

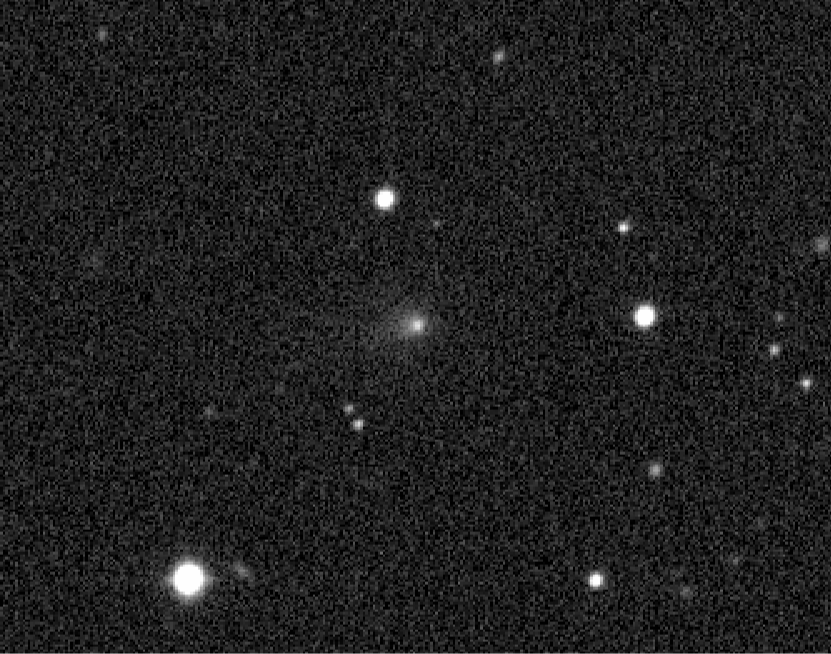
- Fragment A of 101P/Chernykh imaged from the Zwicky Transient Facility on 2 February 2020

Discovery
- Discovered by: Nikolai S. Chernykh
- Discovery site: Crimean Astrophysical Observatory
- Discovery date: 19 August 1977

Designations
- MPC designation: P/1977 Q1, P/1991 L1
- Alternative designations: 1978 IV, 1992 II; 1977l, 1991o

Orbital characteristics
- Epoch: 17 October 2024 (JD 2460600.5)
- Observation arc: 44.53 years
- Number of observations: 1,932
- Aphelion: 9.281 AU (A); 9.249 AU (B)
- Perihelion: 2.349 AU (A); 2.351 AU (B)
- Semi-major axis: 5.815 AU
- Eccentricity: 0.5962
- Orbital period: 14.02 years (A); 13.97 years (B)
- Inclination: 5.049°
- Longitude of ascending node: 116.14°
- Argument of periapsis: 277.93°
- Mean anomaly: 122.19°
- Last perihelion: 12 January 2020 (A); 31 January 2020 (B)
- Next perihelion: 10 January 2034 (A); 21 February 2034 (B)
- T_{Jupiter}: 2.584 (A); 2.588 (B)
- Earth MOID: 1.338 AU (A); 1.362 AU (B)
- Jupiter MOID: 0.158 AU (A); 0.095 AU (B)

Physical characteristics
- Dimensions: 5.6 km (3.5 mi) (A)
- Comet total magnitude (M1): 13.7 (A); 13.0 (B)

101P/Chernykh is a periodic comet which was first discovered on 19 August 1977, by Nikolaj Stepanovich Chernykh. This comet is orbiting the Sun at a distance of 5.8 AU with an eccentricity of 0.60 and an orbital period of 14 years. The elliptical orbit will bring it as close as 2.35 AU and as far as 9.28 AU from the Sun. It will next come to perihelion (closest approach to the Sun) in 2034. The orbital plane is inclined at an angle of 5.05° to the plane of the ecliptic.

In April 1991, the comet was observed to split in two. Zdenek Sekanina, from JPL, concluded that the comet split at a distance of 3.3 AU (490 million km) from the Sun. The primary nucleus is 5.6 km (3.5 mi) in diameter and was last observed in 2022. Fragment B has not been observed since 2006. As of epoch 2022, fragment B takes 21 days longer to orbit the Sun. The companion is not expected to survive its next perihelion passage.

Difference in perihelion date for fragment A+B
Year	Horizons difference
2005	1 day
2020	18 days
2034	43 days

== See also ==
- 74P/Smirnova–Chernykh

Numbered comets
Previous; 100P/Hartley	101P/Chernykh	Next; 102P/Shoemaker
