= 450P/LONEOS =

Periodic comet and centaur

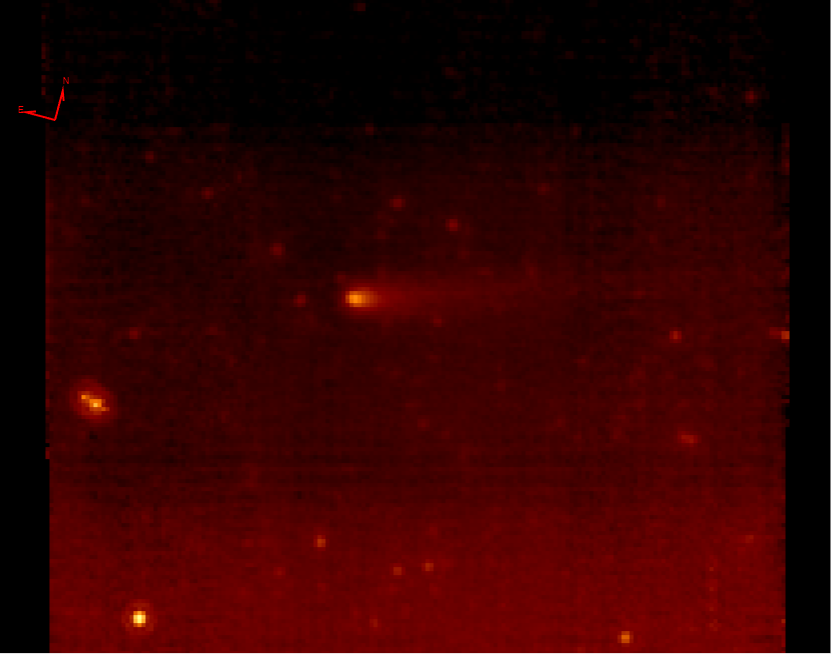
- Infrared image of 450P/LONEOS taken by the Spitzer Space Telescope on 4 March 2007

Discovery
- Discovery site: LONEOS
- Discovery date: 13 January 2004

Designations
- MPC designation: P/2004 A1, P/2022 Q3
- Alternative designations: LONEOS 8

Orbital characteristics
- Epoch: 5 May 2024 (JD 2460800.5)
- Observation arc: 22.56 years (Note: Observation arc from the Minor Planet Center database covering dates from 25 October 2003 until 17 May 2026.)
- Earliest precovery date: 25 October 2003
- Number of observations: 988
- Aphelion: 10.442 AU
- Perihelion: 5.449 AU
- Semi-major axis: 7.945 AU
- Eccentricity: 0.31423
- Orbital period: 22.396 years
- Inclination: 10.653°
- Longitude of ascending node: 124.35°
- Argument of periapsis: 23.148°
- Mean anomaly: 332.08°
- Last perihelion: 25 August 2004
- Next perihelion: 24 July 2027
- T_{Jupiter}: 2.961
- Earth MOID: 4.465 AU
- Jupiter MOID: 0.184 AU

Physical characteristics
- Mean radius: 1.8 ± 0.5 km (1.12 ± 0.31 mi)
- Mean density: 680±100 kg/m^{3}
- Spectral type: (V–R) = 0.51±0.21
- Comet total magnitude (M1): 6.7
- Comet nuclear magnitude (M2): 11.3

450P/LONEOS, also known by its formal designations P/2004 A1 and P/2022 Q3, is a distant periodic comet with a 22-year orbit around the Sun. It is one of several comets discovered by the Lowell Observatory Near-Earth-Object Search (LONEOS) program.

== Observational history ==
=== Discovery ===
The comet was discovered as an 18th-magnitude object on CCD images taken by Brian A. Skiff as part of the Lowell Observatory's LONEOS program. The LONEOS images show the object with a stellar-like appearance, but its motion prompted Skiff to request additional observations. H. R. Miller (Perkins Observatory) and J. Young (Table Mountain Observatory) later found a coma about 4 arcseconds in diameter and a very faint tail about 10 arcseconds in length, confirming its cometary nature. At the time its cometary activity was detected, 450P/LONEOS (then known as P/2004 A1) was about 5.54 AU (829 million km) from the Sun. The first orbital calculations were later published on the Minor Planet Center's website on 13 January 2004, alongside precovery images taken by the Kitt Peak Observatory dating as far back as 18 December 2003.

=== Follow-up observations ===
The comet was successfully recovered from observations taken by the Gemini North Observatory in August 2022, where it was noted to be 4.5 magnitudes fainter than previously predicted. The comet received its official numerical designation (450P) alongside 8 other comets on February 2023.

== Orbit ==
As of 2024, 450P/LONEOS has a heliocentric orbit inclined about 10.65 degrees from the ecliptic. Its perihelion distance is about 5.45 AU (815 million km) while its aphelion goes as far back as 10.44 AU (1.562 billion km) from the Sun. Orbital calculations indicated that it made a close encounter with Saturn in 1992, when it came within 0.031 AU (4.6 million km) to the giant planet. This resulted in its semimajor axis to be significantly decreased by 5.2 AU (780 million km). A long-term orbital investigation indicated that this is likely its first sojourn to the inner Solar System as it transitions from a centaur into a Jupiter-family comet.

On 11 July 2026, the comet approached Jupiter at a distance of 0.5 AU (75 million km), further sending it into a closer orbit around the Sun.

== Physical characteristics ==
A 2011 study revealed that based on its measured dust activity, the nucleus of 450P/LONEOS may be somewhere between 0.5 km (0.31 mi) and 3.5 km (2.2 mi) in radius. At the time it was in an inactive state between 2019 and 2024, further observations from both the Gemini Observatory and the James Webb Space Telescope (JWST) revised this to roughly 1.8±0.5 km. Its asymmetrical coma and anti-tail during its 2004 apparition extended up to a distance of 150,000 km (93,000 mi) in the solar direction.

During its 2022 apparition, it has a low dust production rate of about ~4.8 kg/sec^{−1} primarily driven by CO_{2} outgassing from amorphous water ice crystallization at temperatures between 140–160 K.

== See also ==
- 308P/Lagerkvist–Carsenty, another former centaur that became a short-period comet after a close encounter with Saturn

== Notes ==
Numbered comets
Previous; 449P/Leonard	450P/LONEOS	Next; 451P/Christensen
