= 102P/Shoemaker =

Jupiter-family comet

Discovery
- Discovered by: Carolyn S. Shoemaker; Eugene M. Shoemaker
- Discovery site: Palomar Observatory
- Discovery date: 27 September 1984

Designations
- MPC designation: P/1984 S2; P/1991 L2
- Alternative designations: Shoemaker 1; 1984 XVI, 1991 XXIII; 1984q, 1991p

Orbital characteristics
- Epoch: 21 November 2025 (JD 2461000.5)
- Observation arc: 37.35 years (Note: Observation arc from the Minor Planet Center database covering dates from 1 September 1984 until 6 January 2022.)
- Earliest precovery date: 1 September 1984
- Number of observations: 529
- Aphelion: 5.562 AU
- Perihelion: 2.079 AU
- Semi-major axis: 3.821 AU
- Eccentricity: 0.45582
- Orbital period: 7.468 years
- Inclination: 25.846°
- Longitude of ascending node: 339.35°
- Argument of periapsis: 20.708°
- Mean anomaly: 232.94°
- Last perihelion: 22 January 2021
- Next perihelion: 10 July 2028
- T_{Jupiter}: 2.732
- Earth MOID: 0.976 AU
- Jupiter MOID: 0.191 AU

Physical characteristics
- Mean radius: 0.208 km (0.129 mi)
- Mean density: 430±60 kg/m^{3}
- Comet total magnitude (M1): 16.2

102P/Shoemaker, also known as Shoemaker 1, is a Jupiter-family comet with a 7.47-year orbit around the Sun. It was first seen in 1984, and then again in 1991. Images taken of it in 1999 were not recognized until 2006 when it was once again observed. It was unexpectedly dim in each of these returns.

== Notes ==
Numbered comets
Previous; 101P/Chernykh	102P/Shoemaker	Next; 103P/Hartley
