= 449P/Leonard =

Jupiter-family comet

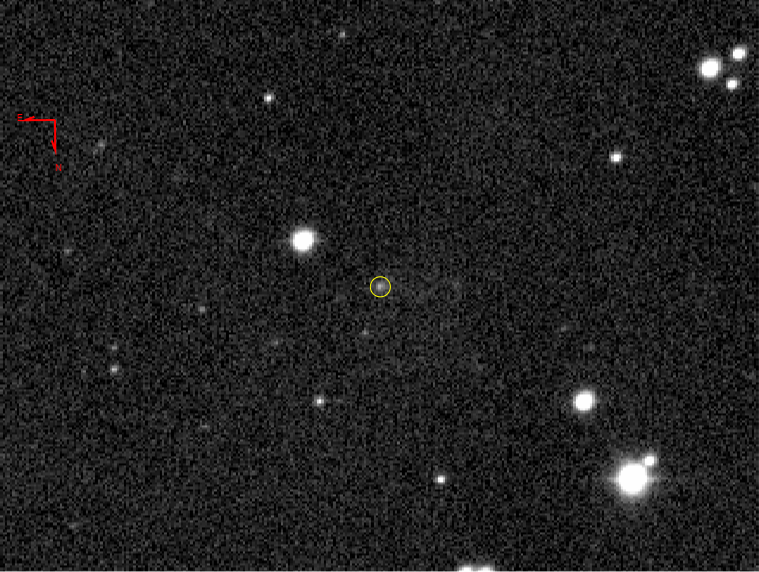
- 449P/Leonard on 17 November 2020, imaged by the Zwicky Transient Facility

Discovery
- Discovered by: Gregory J. Leonard
- Discovery site: Mount Lemmon Observatory
- Discovery date: 29 September 2020

Designations
- MPC designation: X/1987 A2, P/2013 Y3; P/2020 S6
- Alternative designations: Leonard 6; PK20S060; PJ87A020; PK13Y030; KM1987-1

Orbital characteristics
- Epoch: 20 October 2020 (JD 2459142.5)
- Observation arc: 34.11 years (Note: Observation arc from the Minor Planet Center database covering dates from 5 January 1987 until 13 February 2021.)
- Earliest precovery date: 5 January 1987
- Number of observations: 294
- Aphelion: 5.322 AU
- Perihelion: 1.875 AU
- Semi-major axis: 3.598 AU
- Eccentricity: 0.47899
- Orbital period: 6.82 years
- Inclination: 15.459°
- Longitude of ascending node: 242.571°
- Argument of periapsis: 176.652°
- Last perihelion: 23 November 2020
- Next perihelion: 25 September 2027
- T_{Jupiter}: 2.853
- Earth MOID: 0.8872 AU
- Jupiter MOID: 0.0613 AU

Physical characteristics
- Comet total magnitude (M1): 8.6
- Comet nuclear magnitude (M2): 17.7
- Apparent magnitude: 17.5 (1987 apparition)

449P/Leonard is a Jupiter-family comet that orbits the Sun once every 6.83 years. Studies in 2022 show that 449P was a rediscovery of a previously lost comet that was spotted in 1987.

== Discovery and observations ==
On 29 September 2020, Gregory J. Leonard discovered a new comet about 21.5 in apparent magnitude from images taken from the 1.5 m (59 in) telescope of the Mount Lemmon Observatory. Orbital calculations showed it had reached its most recent perihelion on 23 November 2020, and it has frequent close passes with Jupiter. The comet had passed about 0.064 AU (9.6 million km) from the giant planet in 1983, reducing its orbital period from 13.2 years to just 6.82 years.

In 2022, Maik Meyer linked 449P with the previously lost comet, X/1987 A2, which was discovered by Robert H. McNaught and Malcolm Hartley from the Siding Spring Observatory on 5 January 1987. This precovery image of the comet was not found until March 1987, hence precise follow-up observations were not possible at the time. Subsequently, scientists have also identified P/2013 Y6 as another previous apparition of the comet, which was observed from the Mauna Kea Observatory between 2013 and 2014. The comet later received its official numerical designation (449P) alongside nine other comets on February 2023.

The comet will next return to the inner Solar System on 25 September 2027.

== Physical characteristics ==
Photometric observations conducted by the Asteroid Terrestrial-impact Last Alert System (ATLAS) between October 2020 and February 2021 revealed that 449P/Leonard has a dust production rate about ≤2.0 kg/s (4.4 lb/s), which corresponds to a maximum Afρ value of 8.2±0.6 cm about 28 days before and after perihelion.

== Notes ==
Numbered comets
Previous; 448P/PanSTARRS	449P/Leonard	Next; 450P/LONEOS
