= C/1990 K1 (Levy) =

Non-periodic comet

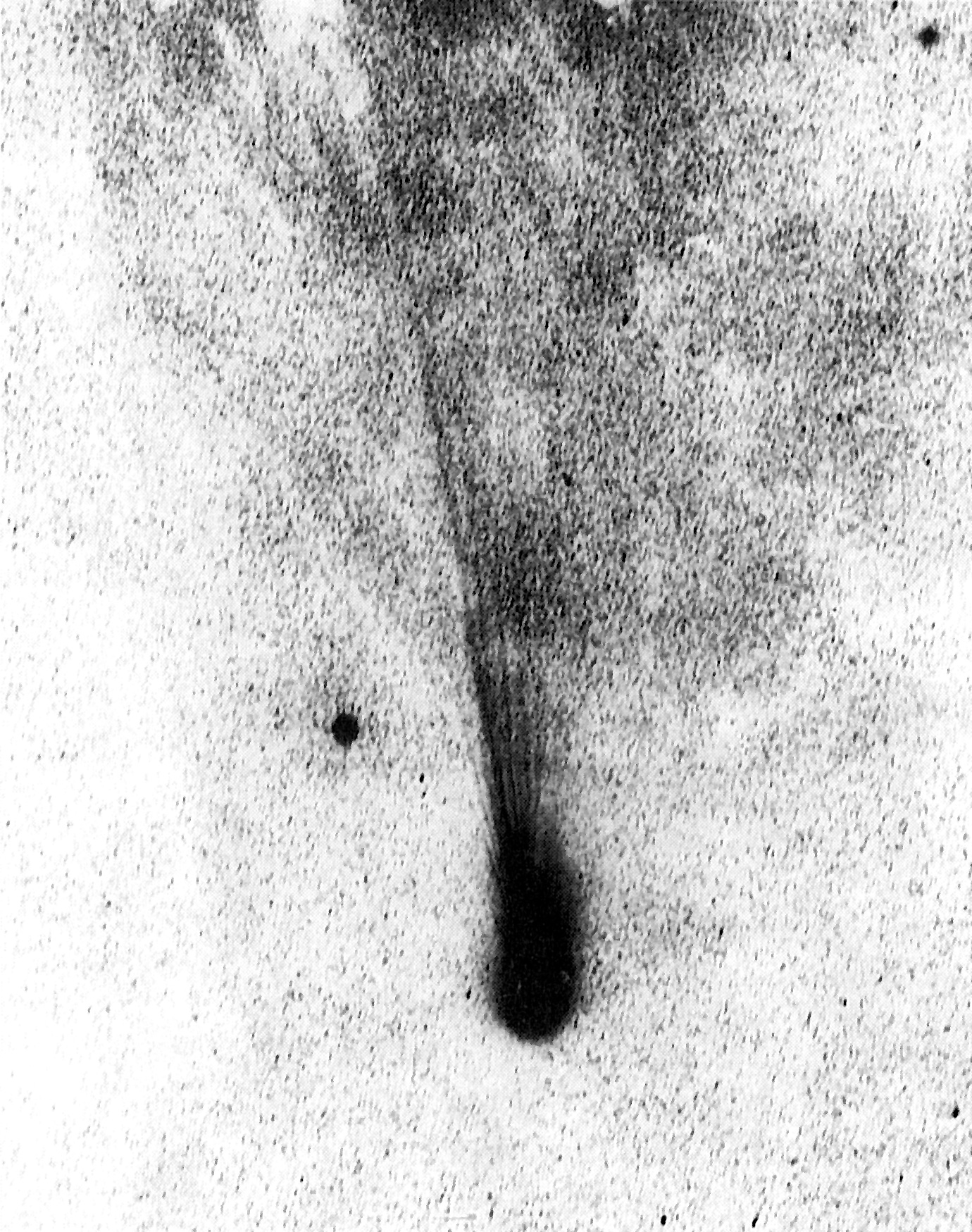
- The comet on 14 September 1990

Discovery
- Discovered by: David H. Levy
- Discovery date: 20 May 1990

Designations
- Alternative designations: 1990c, 1990 XX

Orbital characteristics
- Epoch: 1990-Oct-29.0
- Observation arc: 920 days
- Earliest precovery date: 24 September 1989
- Perihelion: 0.939 AU
- Eccentricity: 1.00058
- Inclination: 131.58°
- Longitude of ascending node: 139.36°
- Argument of periapsis: 242.67°
- Last perihelion: 24 October 1990
- Earth MOID: 0.209 AU

Physical characteristics
- Mean radius: 2.0 km (1.2 mi) (Note: Calculated mean radius using the formula: $\log_{10}\,(\,R\,)\ =\;0.9 +\;0.13 (\,H\,)$ Where $\,H\,$ is the comet's absolute total magnitude (M1))
- Mass: 6.0×10^{12} kg
- Synodic rotation period: 17.0±0.1 hours
- Comet total magnitude (M1): 4.6

C/1990 K1 (Levy) is a non-periodic comet discovered by David H. Levy on 20 May 1990. The comet became bright enough to be visible by naked eye.

== Observational history ==
Amateur astronomer David H. Levy discovered the comet on 20 May 1990, during his comet hunting routine, looking towards the star Alpheratz with a 40-cm reflector. He noted that the comet had a magnitude of 9.6 and a tail about 2 arcminutes long. That was his sixth comet discovery. The comet was then 2.59 AU from the Sun and 3.07 AU from Earth. The discovery was confirmed the next day, with reported magnitudes between 10 and 11.

The comet brightened and the first naked eye observation of the comet was reported on 23 July, with a magnitude of 6.0. The comet the next week was reported to have tail a bit more than a degree long. In August the comet continued to brighten, with John Bortle reporting magnitudes 5.7 and 4.1 on 3 and 28 August respectively. S. Garro, from France reported a magnitude of 3.6 on 23 August. The tail of the comet could be observed by naked eye, but most reports about its appearance were made with optical aid. The tail was reported to be about 3.5 degrees long at the end of the month. The closest approach to Earth was on 26 August 1990, at a distance of 0.43 AU (64 million km; 40 million mi).

During September 1990, the comet faded slowly, as it was moving away from Earth, but towards perihelion. By 20 September its magnitude was reported to be around 5. On 27 September the comet was observed by the Hubble Space Telescope, the first one observed by it. In October the comet was only visible from the Southern Hemisphere, with the comet fading to a magnitude of 6. Perihelion took place on 24 October. Solar elongation decreased to 24 degrees in November and observations were few. The comet was recovered on 10 December by Alan Hale, at magnitude 7. Subsequently, the comet started moving northwards. The next two months tail lengths between 0.5 and 1.5 degrees were reported while the comet was fading slowly.

The comet was last detected on 1 April 1992 in CCD images obtained by the Oak Ridge Observatory with 155-cm reflector.

== Scientific results ==
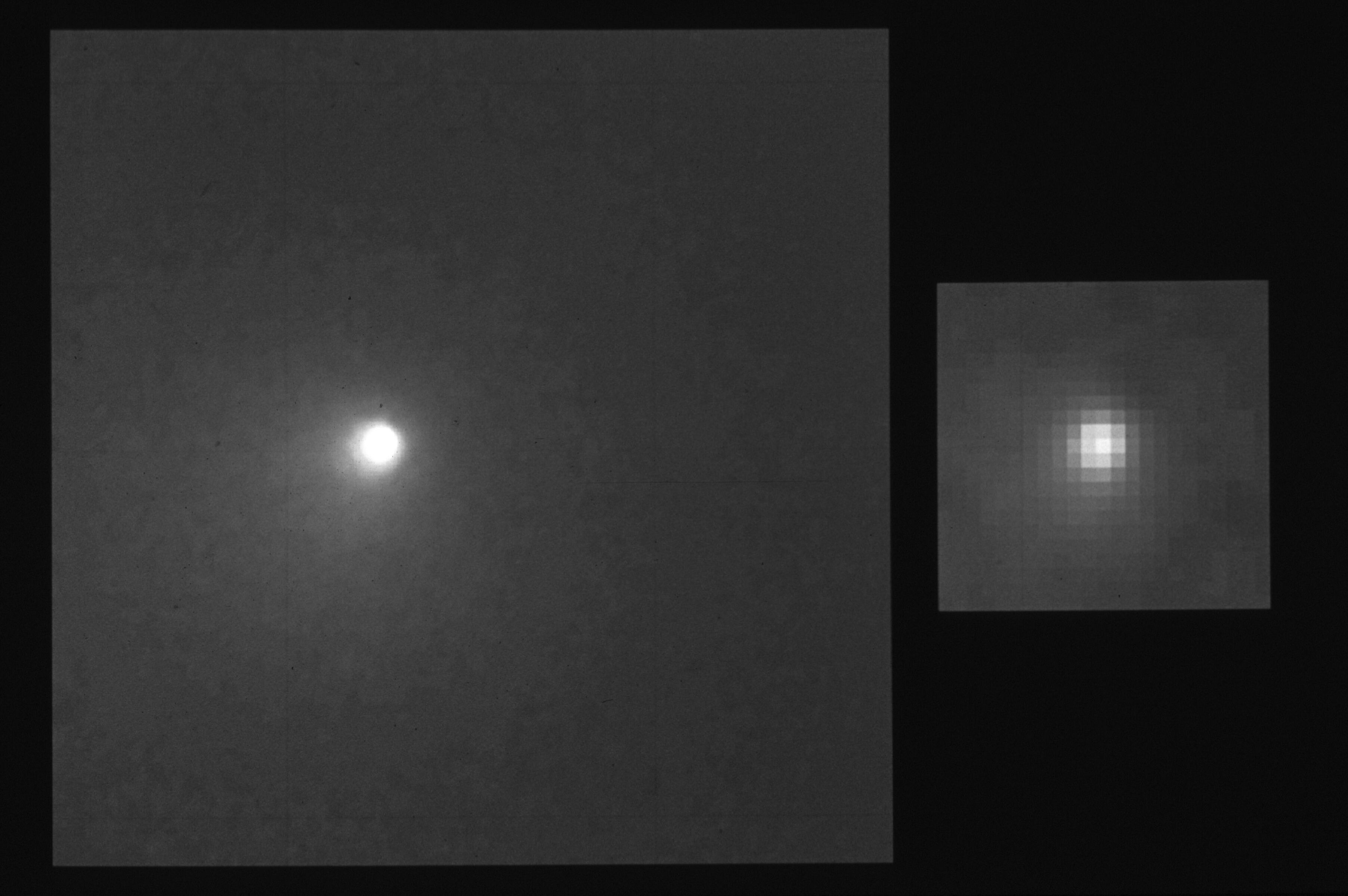
Comet Levy by the Hubble Space Telescope (core enlarged four-fold in smaller image)

Comet Levy was well positioned in the sky to be observed both before and after perihelion and quite bright. The production rates OH, NH, CN, C2, and C3 were measured in different distances from the Sun, with most species having a larger production rate before perihelion, with most pronounced asymmetry being that of hydroxyl, with its production peaking about a month before that of the other molecules. In shorter timescales, the comet was found to variate both in optical and ultraviolet wavelengths. The variation in optical wavelength was estimated to be 18.9 hours in late August, while the International Ultraviolet Explorer (IUE) on 18 September detected a period of 17.0 ± 0.1 hours. That period also doesn't fit well with observations made by IUE on 11 and 13 September, indicating that the period decreased between the observations. By January 1991 the brightness variation was less than 1%.

Comet Levy was observed by Hubble Space Telescope (HST) on 27 September 1990, about 5 months after its launch. As the tracking of Solar System objects had not yet been developed, HST obtained only short exposures of the comet with the Wide Field Camera. Two 4 seconds exposures with a red broadband filter were obtained 6.5 hours apart. The coma was found to be brighter at the sunward side than the tailward, indicating that sublimation takes place primarily at the dayside of the nucleus. An arc of dust was found to expand in the coma, with the creation of such arcs probably resulting in the observed periodic brightness changes of the comet. No jets could be confidently observed.

The velocity of H_{2}O+ ions was measured using the Doppler shift of the emission lines from 16 to 25 August 1990. It was found that velocities near the nucleus were around 10 km/s while in the tail they accelerated to 50–70 km/s. The mean H_{2}O+ production rate within these dates was 1.5×10^{27} per second.

The comet was observed with the ASTRO-1's Hopkins Ultraviolet Telescope on 10 December 1990, during the Space Shuttle mission, STS-35. The ultraviolet spectrum obtained revealed the presence of carbon monoxide (CO), atomic hydrogen, carbon and sulfur. The OI and OII lines could be masked off due their presence in the airglow. CO production was estimated to be (1.4±0.3)×10^{28} molecules per second. IUE detected emission lines of OH, CS, and CO_{2}^{+}, which exhibited flux variation within a period of hours. It also detected CO.

Methanol fluorescence was detected in infrared images of the comet. These images also constitute the first two-dimensional images of methanol distribution in a comet's coma. The methanol production rate was estimated to be (3±1)×10^{26} molecules per second on 10 August 1990. The rotational lines of methanol as observed by IRAM indicate a production of 2.2×10^{27} per second on 26–31 August. It indicates that methanol is an important volatile in comets. IRAM also detected rotational lines of hydrogen sulfide. Its presence indicates that the comet was formed in a location with very low temperatures.

Caltech submillimeter observatory detected emission lines of hydrogen cyanide (J=4-3 transion line), formaldehyde (J=5(1,5)-4(1,4) lines) and methanol (J=5-4 band). The rotational temperature of HCN was estimated to be 33 ± 1 K, which was higher than predicted, indicating that collisions of HCN take place. Formaldehyde rotational temperature was close to the expected.
