= C/1989 Q1 (Okazaki–Levy–Rudenko) =

Hyperbolic comet

Discovery
- Discovered by: Kiyomi Okazaki; David H. Levy; Michael Rudenko
- Discovery date: 24–26 August 1989

Designations
- Alternative designations: 1989 XIX, 1989r

Orbital characteristics
- Epoch: 8 October 1989 (JD 2447807.5)
- Observation arc: 122 days
- Number of observations: 255
- Perihelion: 0.642 AU
- Eccentricity: 1.00006
- Inclination: 90.146°
- Longitude of ascending node: 275.51°
- Argument of periapsis: 150.57°
- Last perihelion: 11 November 1989
- Earth MOID: 0.288 AU
- Jupiter MOID: 1.008 AU

Physical characteristics
- Mean radius: 1.00±0.12 km
- Mass: 1.8×10^{12} kg
- Mean density: 460±80 kg/m^{3}
- Comet total magnitude (M1): 7.5
- Apparent magnitude: 4.9 (1989 apparition)

Comet Okazaki–Levy–Rudenko, also known by its formal designation C/1989 Q1, is a hyperbolic comet that was barely visible to the naked eye from August 1989 to January 1990. It is also notable for having an orbit that is almost perpendicular to the ecliptic.

== Physical characteristics ==
Spectrophotometer measurements taken in October 1989 detected cyanogen (CN) and diatomic carbon (C_{2}) molecules emitting from the comet while it was 0.795 AU (118.9 million km) from the Sun.

In December 1989, the comet produced two unusual features, a wedge-shaped coma and an antisolar jet. The high levels of polarization in the vicinity of the jet suggest the presence of dust particles that is relatively smaller than that was observed from Halley in 1986.

Its nucleus is estimated to be around 1.00 ± 0.12 km (0.621 ± 0.075 mi) in radius.
