= RAVE (survey) =

Astronomical survey

RAdial Velocity Experiment
- Alternative names: RAVE
- Website: www.rave-survey.aip.de/rave/

RAVE (RAdial Velocity Experiment) is a multi-fiber spectroscopic astronomical survey of stars in the Milky Way using the 1.2-metre UK Schmidt Telescope of the Australian Astronomical Observatory (AAO). The RAVE collaboration consists of researchers from over 20 institutions around the world and is coordinated by the Leibniz Institute for Astrophysics Potsdam (AIP).

As a Southern Hemisphere survey covering 20,000 square degrees of the sky, RAVE's primary aim is to derive the radial velocity of stars from the observed spectra. Additional information is also derived such as effective temperature, surface gravity, metallicity, photometric parallax and elemental abundance data for the stars.

On April 5, 2013 RAVE concluded its phase of data taking. In an almost ten year observing campaign, a total of 574,630 spectra have been obtained on 483,330 individual stars by a small team of AAO observers, with other observers making occasional visits from RAVE participating institutions.

== Description ==
RAVE is an observational program in the field of Near Field Cosmology which exploits our position inside the Milky Way to study its formation and evolution in greater detail than is possible for other galaxies. RAVE focuses on obtaining stellar radial velocities to study the motions of stars in the Milky Way's thin and thick disk and stellar halo. The vast majority of stars in our Galaxy have no velocity measurements, and particularly no time-consuming radial velocity measurements. RAVE utilizes fiber optics to perform multiple, simultaneous spectroscopy on up to 150 stars in a single observation. In this way it can obtain a representative sample of the nearby stars in our Galaxy which are all around, over a wide area of the sky.

For the majority of RAVE stars proper motion data is also available. Combining the proper motions with distances derived using the photometric parallax method, the transverse velocity of these stars can be calculated. With the observed radial velocities the full 6D phase space information for the stars is then obtainable.

RAVE is complementary to the SDSS project's SEGUE program as it a southern hemisphere, wide-field, intermediate-depth, intermediate spectral resolution survey with limited wavelength coverage. Conversely, SEGUE is a northern hemisphere survey with selected angular coverage, deep exposures, low-resolution but large wavelength coverage.

Most of the stars observed by RAVE are between 1,500 light-years (0.46 kpc) and 13,000 light-years (4.0 kpc) from the Sun and so RAVE surveys halfway to the Galactic Center and halfway to the edge of the Galaxy's disk.

== Observations ==
Since the end of the 6dF Galaxy Survey in 2004, the UK Schmidt telescope at Siding Spring has been dedicated to the RAVE survey. This followed the first year of the pilot phase of the survey (April 2003 - April 2004), where RAVE observed around the full moon period. RAVE exploits the wide field-of-view of the UK Schmidt (6 degrees on the sky) as well as the capabilities of the UK Schmidt's 6dF instrument.

The multi-object spectrograph 6dF (6 degree Field) utilizes interchangeable field plates with robot-positional optical fibers, with 150 fibers each. Each fiber is attached to a `button' which is positioned by the robot (to a precision of 10 micrometres) in order to capture the light from one target star. Once the field plate is configured it matches the pattern of stars on the sky that it is observing. Three field plates are available, which means that one plate can be configured by the robot while another is being used in the telescope. From the telescope the light is sent down the optical fibers to the spectrograph unit to be dispersed through a diffraction grating and then recorded on a 1056 X 1027 CCD chip.

An initial quality check of the data is performed at Macquarie University in Australia and the results are sent to the University of Padova, Italy for data reduction. The reduced data is then sent to the Leibniz Institute for Astrophysics Potsdam in Germany for final extraction of the radial velocities and the other stellar parameters.

== Results ==
Studies from RAVE either concentrate on peculiar stars and objects or overall trends for the different components of our Galaxy, with a main focus of the structure and formation of the Milky Way. For example, RAVE is suited to searching for stellar streams, some of which are remnants of dwarf galaxies that merged with the Milky Way during galaxy formation. A search for a stellar stream from the Sagittarius Dwarf Elliptical Galaxy - which is currently merging with the Milky Way - in the vicinity of the sun yielded a null result, which helps constrain the shape of the Milky Way's dark halo. Another study of the highest velocity stars was used to constrain the local Galactic escape velocity and so the mass of the dark halo.

RAVE is a precursor to ESA's Gaia mission and studies with RAVE show the science potential of this upcoming survey of stars in the Milky Way.

== Data access ==
RAVE data is available from the RAVE web server or from the VizieR catalog. The RAVE 4th Data Release, includes the radial velocities, stellar parameters (temperatures, gravities, metallicities), individual abundances and photometric parallaxes/distances as well as supplementary photometry and astrometry for roughly 500 000 stars.

== See also ==
- Milky Way
- Sloan Digital Sky Survey
- Gaia mission
- UK Schmidt Telescope
