= 128P/Shoemaker–Holt =

Periodic comet with 9 year orbit

Discovery
- Discovered by: Carolyn S. Shoemaker; Eugene M. Shoemaker; Henry E. Holt
- Discovery date: October 18, 1987

Designations
- MPC designation: P/1987 U1; P/1996 S2
- Alternative designations: Shoemaker–Holt 1, 1988 VII

Orbital characteristics
- Epoch: March 6, 2006
- Aphelion: 5.952 AU
- Perihelion: 3.068 AU
- Semi-major axis: 4.51 AU
- Eccentricity: 0.3197
- Orbital period: 9.579 a
- Inclination: 4.3555°
- Last perihelion: May 6, 2017? (A); January 10, 2017; June 13, 2007
- Next perihelion: 2026-Jul-17; 2026-Jul-17 (B); 2027-Jan-10? (A)
- Jupiter MOID: 0.153 AU (22,900,000 km)

Physical characteristics
- Dimensions: 4.6 km (B)
- Mean density: 610±90 kg/m^{3}

128P/Shoemaker–Holt, also known as Shoemaker-Holt 1, is a periodic comet in the Solar System. The comet passed close to Jupiter in 1982 and was discovered in 1987. The comet was last observed in March 2018.

The nucleus was split into two pieces (A+B) during the 1997 apparition. Fragment A was last observed in 1996 and only has a 79-day observation arc. Fragment B is estimated to be 4.6 km in diameter.

Numbered comets
Previous; 127P/Holt–Olmstead	128P/Shoemaker–Holt	Next; 129P/Shoemaker–Levy
