= Australian Astronomical Observatory =

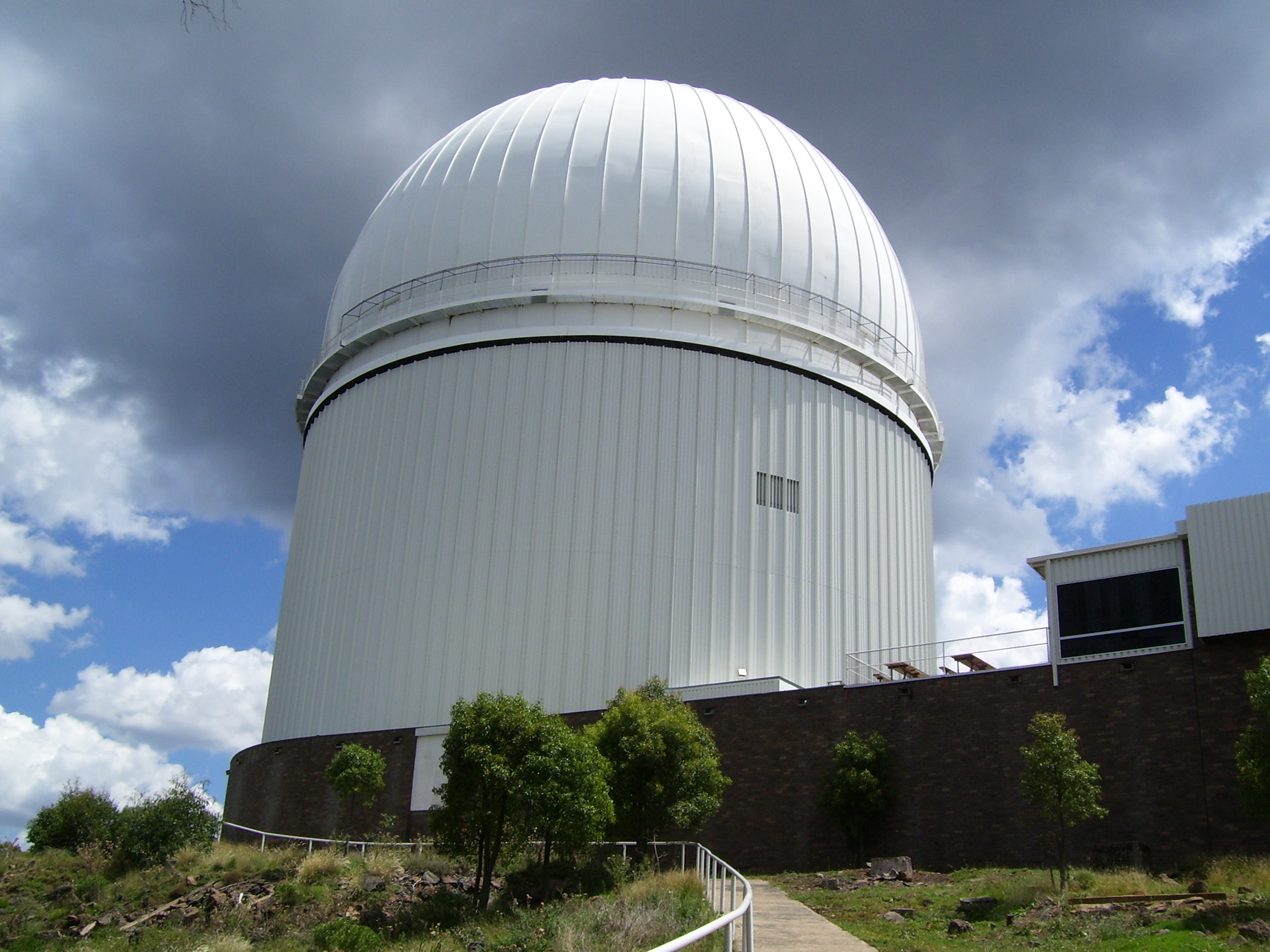
- Alternative names: AAO
- Location: North Ryde, Sydney, New South Wales, AUS
- Coordinates: 33°47′46″S 151°08′42″E
- Altitude: 1,164 m (3,819 ft)
- Website: www.aao.gov.au
- Telescopes: Anglo-Australian Telescope; UK Schmidt Telescope
- Related media on Commons

The Australian Astronomical Observatory (AAO), formerly the Anglo-Australian Observatory, is an optical and near-infrared astronomy observatory with its headquarters in North Ryde in suburban Sydney, Australia. Originally funded jointly by the United Kingdom and Australian governments, it was managed wholly by Australia's Department of Industry, Innovation, Science, Research and Tertiary Education. The AAO operated the 3.9-metre Anglo-Australian Telescope (AAT) and 1.2-metre UK Schmidt Telescope (UKST) at Siding Spring Observatory, located near the town of Coonabarabran, Australia.

In addition to operating the two telescopes, AAO staff carried out astronomical research, and designed and built astronomical instrumentation for the AAT, UKST, and other telescopes including the European Southern Observatory (ESO)'s Very Large Telescope in Chile, and the Japanese Subaru Telescope on Mauna Kea in Hawaii.

UK involvement in the AAO ceased in June 2010, with the change of name and management arrangements effective from 1 July 2010.

== History ==
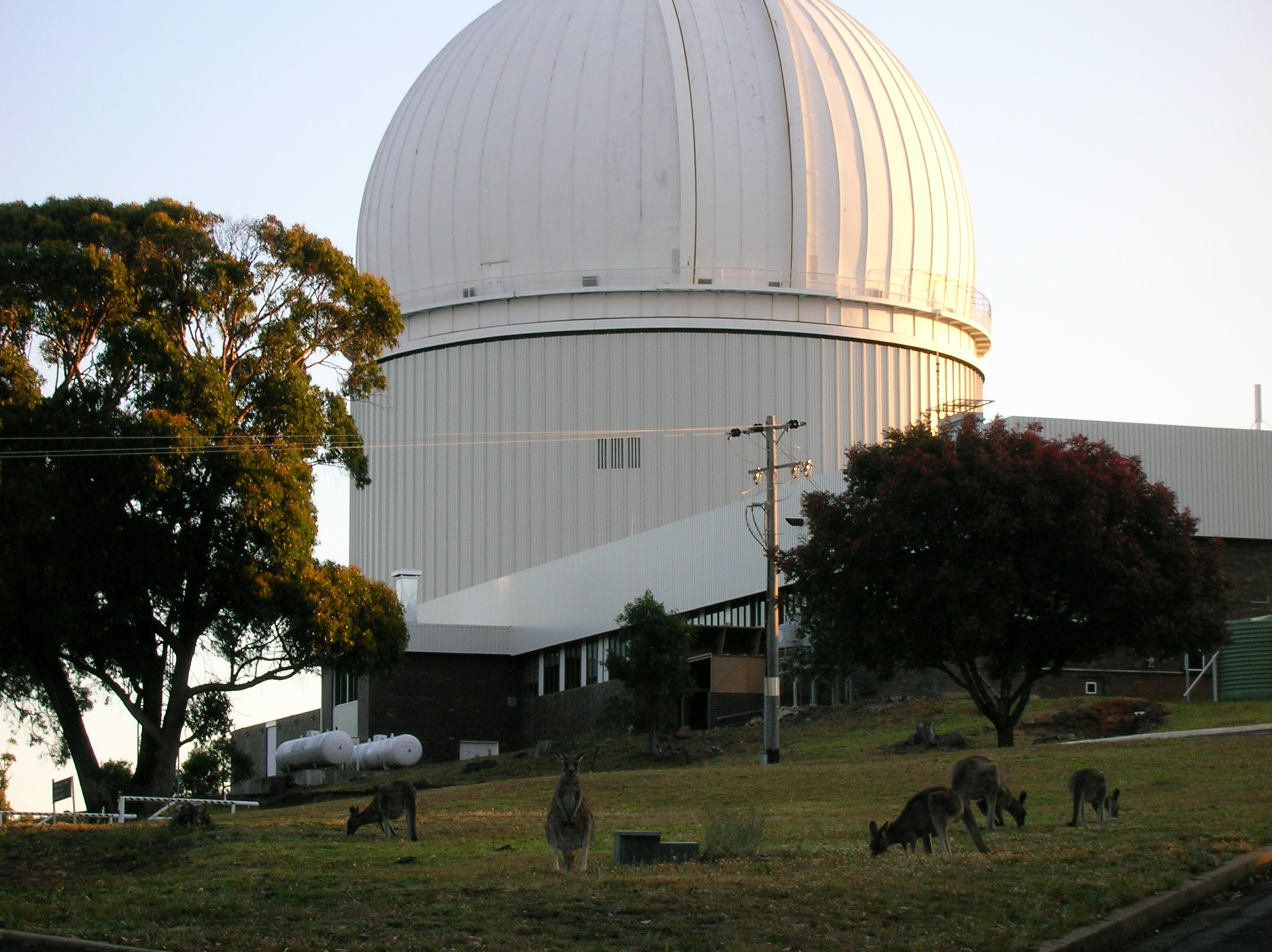
The Australian Astronomical Observatory in 2008 (then called the "Anglo-Australian Observatory"). The staff tea room is in the lower left corner and the workshop to the right. The kangaroos in the foreground are a common sight at dusk.

In the years immediately after World War II optical observational astronomy in the UK was toiling due to a lack of modern infrastructure. There were no large telescopes in the Southern Hemisphere despite some of the most intriguing astronomical objects (e.g. the Galactic Center and the Magellanic Clouds) being best placed for study from these latitudes. In the 1950s Richard Woolley, Director of Mount Stromlo Observatory from 1939 to 1956 and Astronomer Royal from 1956 to 1971, suggested constructing a large telescope in Australia.

After a series of meetings between British and Australian scientists in the early 1960s to discuss the technical specifications and begin the search for a suitable site for the proposed telescope, a formal approach was made to the governments of both countries in July 1965. It was finally agreed in April 1967 that the building of a 150" telescope, the Anglo-Australian Telescope (AAT), should proceed. The telescope was to be located on Siding Spring Mountain in the Warrumbungles, which was owned by the Australian National University (ANU) and the site of some of their existing infrastructure.

Later that year an interim body known as the Joint Policy Committee, and including prominent scientists Edward Bowen (Aus), Olin Eggen (Aus), Richard Woolley (UK) and Jim Hosie (UK) was formed to oversee the early running of a project office which was located in Canberra. The project office finalised designs and specifications for the telescope, the mounting and the building and let contracts on a worldwide basis, exploiting the experience of those staff members who were involved in the development and construction of the Parkes radio telescope.

The Anglo-Australian Telescope Agreement was signed on 25 September 1969 and came into effect on 22 February 1971. The Joint Policy Committee was replaced by the Anglo-Australian Telescope Board (AATB), an entity with full legal status under Australian law with responsibilities of overseeing the running of the telescope.

As construction of the AAT gathered pace, a heated debate ensued as to the details of the management structure which would control the telescope. Then Director of Mount Stromlo and Siding Spring Observatories, Olin Eggen and then Vice-Chancellor of the ANU, John Crawford, claimed that the bi-national agreement did not provide for the creation of a separate observatory. They argued that the telescope should ultimately be under the control of the Director of Mount Stromlo and Siding Spring Observatories and that additional staff for the new telescope should be provided by the ANU. However, fearing that they would be mere guests rather than equal partners in the AAT, British astronomers, with support from Australian state university astronomers, campaigned hard for a separate director and staff who were employed by and answerable only to the AATB. The matter was not settled until June 1973 when the Australian government endorsed the AATBs decision for an independent staff, marking the birth of the Anglo-Australian Observatory. The first director, Joe Wampler, took up his post in September 1974. To date there have been five directors.

== Construction of the Anglo-Australian Telescope ==
In late 1967 the contract for the primary mirror blank was awarded to Owens-Illinois, USA and the 27.5 ton structure was cast from zero-expansion Cervit glass in April 1969. The blank was shipped to Newcastle-upon-Tyne, England to be figured and polished by Grubb Parsons. The final product has a diameter of 3.9m and a focal length of 12.7m.

Construction of the building and dome, undertaken by the Australian companies Leighton Contractors and Evans-Deakin Industries respectively, began in late 1970 and was completed by the end of 1972. The building was manufactured from concrete, stands 26m high, and has seven floors housing offices, labs, and a mirror aluminising chamber. The telescope stands on a concrete pier with a separate foundation from the main building, to reduce the risk of vibrations. The double skinned dome is manufactured from both steel and aluminium and weighs 570 tonnes.

The telescope is mounted equatorially, loosely following the design of the 4m Kitt Peak National Observatory telescope. The mount was manufactured in Muroran, Japan by Mitsubishi Electric. It was shipped to Australia in early 1973 before being assembled at Siding Spring Mountain in April of that year. The telescope drive system was also produced by Mitsubishi Electric and delivered at this time. It was one of the first to be controlled by computer, an Interdata Model 70, and provided new levels of pointing and tracking precision. Assembly of the AAT was completed by 1974 and commissioning of the telescope began in April of that year. In total it took eight years to build at a cost of A$16 million. It was inaugurated by HRH Prince Charles on 16 October 1974 and went into general use in June 1975.

== Research with the AAT ==
The AAO has made use of optical fibres in astronomy for over 25 years. Instruments such as AAOmega, and its predecessor 2dF, use optical fibres to feed the light of stars and galaxies from the telescope into a spectrograph where it is dispersed into its component colours for detailed subsequent analysis. The broad field-of-view accessed by the 2dF and AAOmega instruments (4 times the width of the moon) and their 400 optical fibres, makes it feasible to spectroscopically survey large numbers of objects distributed across expansive areas of sky in a reasonable time frame.

A number of major studies undertaken with the AAT have exploited these capabilities. The 2dF Galaxy Redshift Survey (2dFGRS) used the 2dF instrument to obtain spectra and redshifts for ~250000 galaxies brighter than B~19.5 over ~7% of the southern sky in only ~270 nights. The 2dFGRS sample size was an order of magnitude greater than those of previous surveys, allowing a rigorous evaluation of cosmological parameters. For example, the survey has refined estimates of the mass density of the Universe, provided a determination of the fraction of baryonic matter in the Universe and set an upper limit on the total mass of neutrinos. In addition 2dFGRS yielded an independent estimate of the Hubble constant, which was in excellent agreement with value determined by the Hubble Space Telescope Key Project.

The ongoing WiggleZ project is using the AAT and AAOmega to measure the redshifts of ~200000 distant luminous blue star forming galaxies distributed over an area of ~5000 times the area of the moon. The primary goal of this study is to use an intrinsic feature in the distribution of galaxies as a "standard ruler" to relate distance to redshift and improve our knowledge of the nature of dark energy. This mysterious component of the Universe appears to be responsible for accelerating its rate of expansion.

Another AAOmega based survey on the AAT, Galaxy and Mass Assembly (GAMA), is in the process of obtaining optical spectroscopy for ~250000 galaxies in the Local Universe. The AAOmega data will be used in conjunction with observations from satellite observatories such as the Herschel Space Observatory, and other telescopes around the world, to examine the predictions of the Cold Dark Matter standard cosmological model, like the relationship between the number density of dark matter halos and their masses and the relationship between the number density of galaxies and their masses as determined through studying their starlight.

The AAT also hosts a program to search for extrasolar planets, the Anglo-Australian Planet Search (AAPS). The AAPS exploits the high stability of the University College London Echelle Spectrograph (UCLES) to obtain the few metres per second precision in measurements of the line-of-sight velocities of stars necessary to detect the reflex Doppler motion induced by the presence of a planet. The AAPS has found more than 20 extrasolar planets, with masses ranging from ~10% to > 10 times that of Jupiter.

== The Schmidt Telescope ==
The 1.2-metre UK Schmidt Telescope was built to complement the AAT and officially began operations in August 1973. It was designed for survey astronomy, having an extremely large field-of-view which is more than 12 times the apparent diameter of the moon. The telescope was operated by the Schmidt Telescope Unit of the Royal Observatory, Edinburgh until 1988, when it was agreed that control would be handed over to the AAO.

The Schmidt has undertaken work including blue and red photographic surveys of the southern sky and the 6dF Galaxy Survey. Its multi-object spectroscopic capability is currently being exploited to perform the Radial Velocity Experiment (RAVE) survey.

== See also ==
- Digitized Sky Survey
- List of astronomical observatories
- Sky survey
