= 139P/Väisälä–Oterma =

Periodic comet with 9 year orbit

Discovery
- Discovered by: Yrjö Väisälä; Liisi Oterma
- Discovery date: October 7, 1939

Designations
- Alternative designations: 1939 TN; 1998 WG22

Orbital characteristics
- Epoch: March 6, 2006
- Aphelion: 5.62 AU
- Perihelion: 3.402 AU
- Semi-major axis: 4.511 AU
- Eccentricity: 0.2458
- Orbital period: 9.58 a
- Inclination: 2.3296°
- Last perihelion: December 10, 2017; April 19, 2008
- Next perihelion: 2027-Jul-23

Physical characteristics
- Mean radius: 2.6 km (1.6 mi)
- Mean density: 510±70 kg/m^{3}

139P/Väisälä–Oterma is a periodic comet in the Solar System. When it was discovered in 1939 it was not recognized as a comet and designated as asteroid 1939 TN.

Numbered comets
Previous; 138P/Shoemaker–Levy	139P/Väisälä–Oterma	Next; 140P/Bowell–Skiff
