= 255P/Levy =

Periodic comet

Discovery
- Discovered by: David H. Levy
- Discovery site: Jarnac Observatory (G92)
- Discovery date: 2 October 2006

Designations
- MPC designation: P/2006 T1; P/2011 Y1
- Alternative designations: Levy 2, PK06T010

Orbital characteristics
- Epoch: 21 November 2025 (JD 2461000.5)
- Observation arc: 5,484 days (15 years)
- Number of observations: 590
- Aphelion: 5.04 AU
- Perihelion: 0.847 AU
- Semi-major axis: 2.94 AU
- Eccentricity: 0.7120
- Orbital period: 5.05 years
- Inclination: 13.43°
- Longitude of ascending node: 275.64°
- Argument of periapsis: 186.03°
- Last perihelion: 7 September 2022
- Next perihelion: 25 September 2027
- T_{Jupiter}: 2.792
- Earth MOID: 0.0088 AU (2007)
- Jupiter MOID: 0.1540 AU (2007)

Physical characteristics
- Comet total magnitude (M1): 11.5
- Comet nuclear magnitude (M2): 15.1
- Apparent magnitude: 9.5 (2006 apparition)

255P/Levy, formerly P/2006 T1 and P/2011 Y1, is a Jupiter-family comet with an orbital period of 5.25 years. During the 2006 passage the comet achieved an apparent magnitude of ~9.5. Levy (PK06T010) was believed to have been recovered on 3 June 2011 at magnitude 19.8, but other observatories were unable to confirm a recovery. It was most likely a false positive because of large residuals. Levy was recovered on 17 December 2011 at magnitude 19.8, and given the second designation 2011 Y1. It was then numbered.

It next comes to perihelion on 25 September 2027, but is only expected to brighten to around magnitude 20.

It came to perihelion on 14 January 2012 at a distance of 1.007 AU (150.6 million km) from the Sun. The comet passed the Earth on 2012-Jan-26 at a distance of 0.2359 AU (35.29×10^{6} km). During the 2012 passage the comet was originally expected to reach an apparent magnitude of 7, but the comet had been in outburst in 2006 and was much dimmer than expected when it was recovered in 2011. MPC estimates after the 2011 recovery estimated that it would reach a magnitude of 17, and it had an elongation of 90°. However, CCD images showed it was diffuse and the comet's magnitude was estimated at 14.1 on 30 December 2011. The comet was not observed during the 2017 or 2022 perihelion passage. At opposition in August 2016 it would have been dimmer than magnitude 19.

255P/Levy (using an epoch of 2007) has a minimum orbit intersection distance with Earth roughly about 0.0088 AU (1.32 million km).

The comet has been associated with α Cepheids meteor shower, which peaks on 2 January.
