= 118P/Shoemaker–Levy =

Jupiter-family comet

- Comet Shoemaker–Levy 4 photographed from the Zwicky Transient Facility on 1 December 2022

Discovery
- Discovered by: Carolyn S. Shoemaker; Eugene Merle Shoemaker; David H. Levy
- Discovery date: 9 February 1991

Designations
- MPC designation: P/1991 C2, P/1995 M1
- Alternative designations: Shoemaker–Levy 4; 1990 XII, 1991f

Orbital characteristics
- Epoch: 21 November 2025 (JD 2461000.5)
- Observation arc: 34.31 years
- Number of observations: 4,088
- Aphelion: 4.869 AU
- Perihelion: 1.829 AU
- Semi-major axis: 3.349 AU
- Eccentricity: 0.45380
- Orbital period: 6.129 years
- Inclination: 10.093°
- Longitude of ascending node: 142.05°
- Argument of periapsis: 314.97°
- Mean anomaly: 175.62°
- Last perihelion: 24 November 2022
- Next perihelion: 11 January 2029
- T_{Jupiter}: 2.957
- Earth MOID: 0.865 AU
- Jupiter MOID: 0.614 AU

Physical characteristics
- Mean radius: 2.61 km (1.62 mi)
- Mean density: 560±100 kg/m^{3}
- Comet total magnitude (M1): 12.4
- Comet nuclear magnitude (M2): 14.8

118P/Shoemaker–Levy (also known as Shoemaker–Levy 4) is a Jupiter-family comet discovered by astronomers Carolyn and Eugene M. Shoemaker and David Levy.

During the 2010 apparition the comet became as bright as apparent magnitude 11.5.

On 3 December 2015, comet Shoemaker–Levy 4 passed 0.0442 AU (6.61 million km; 4.11 million mi) from asteroid 4 Vesta.

This comet should not be confused with Comet Shoemaker–Levy 9 (D/1993 F2) which spectacularly crashed into Jupiter in 1994.

== Physical characteristics ==
Hubble observations in 2004 estimated that the nucleus of Shoemaker–Levy 4 is estimated to be about 4.8 km (3.0 mi) in diameter. Follow-up observations in 2011 revealed that it is slightly larger, at 5.22 km (3.24 mi) in diameter.

Numbered comets
Previous; 117P/Helin–Roman–Alu	118P/Shoemaker–Levy	Next; 119P/Parker–Hartley
