= Densitometer =

Device measuring optical density

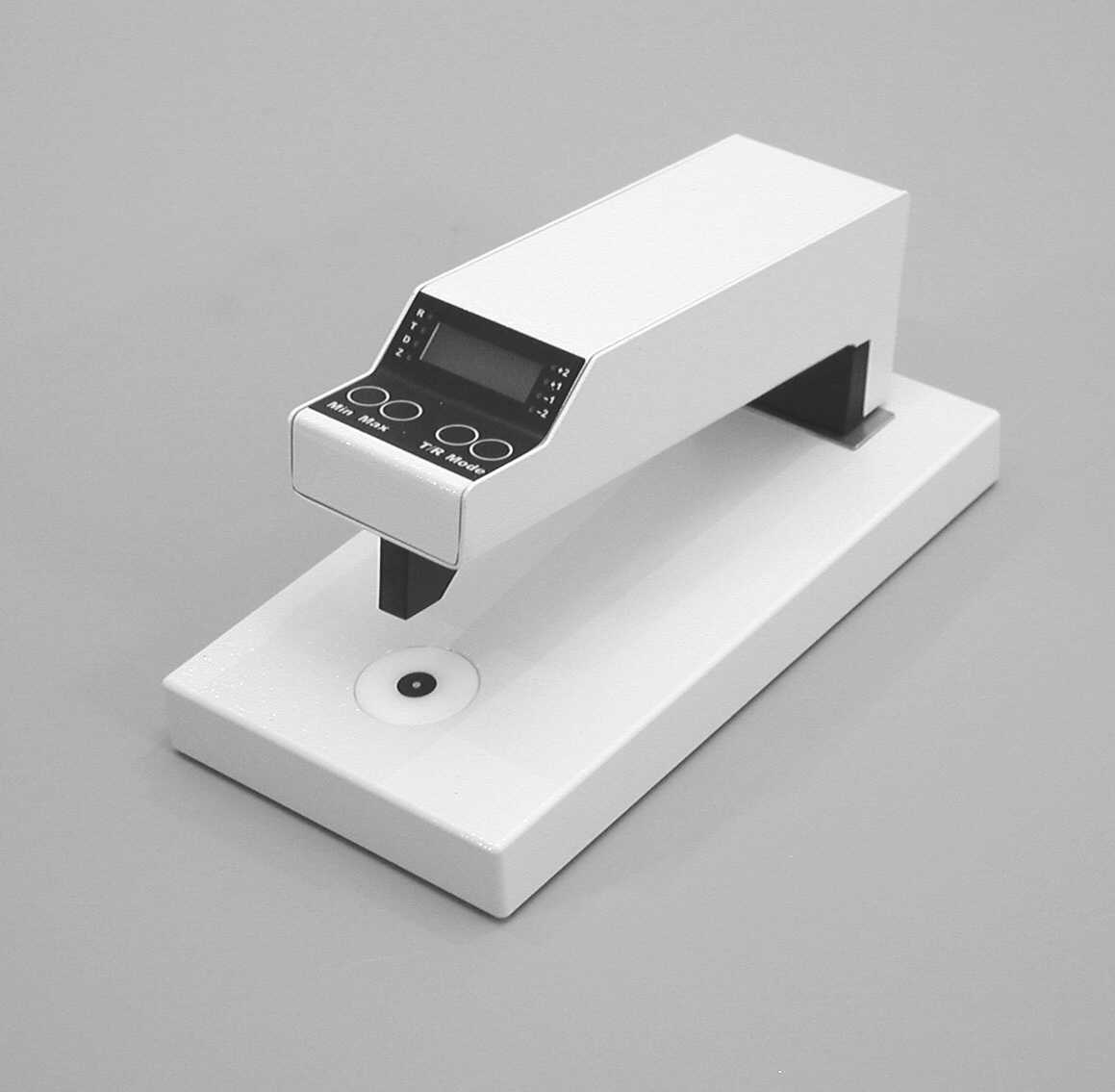
Heiland Densitometer TRDZ 1

A densitometer is a device that measures the degree of darkness (the optical density) of a photographic or semitransparent material or of a reflecting surface. The densitometer is basically a light source aimed at a photoelectric cell. It determines the density of a sample placed between the light source and the photoelectric cell from differences in the readings. Modern densitometers have the same components, but also have electronic integrated circuitry for better reading.

== Types ==
- Transmission densitometers that measure transparent materials
- A transmission densitometer used to measure transparent surfaces measure color transparencies. Film & transparent substrates are some examples of common transparent surface measures.
- Reflection densitometers that measure light reflected from a surface of any state.

== Applications ==
Some are capable of both types of measurements selectable by a switch. They are used in film photography to measure densities of negatives with the switch in the "T" (Transmission) position and the saturation of a resulting print in the "R" position. Such measurements enable the photographer to choose the right photo paper and the correct exposure, obviating experiments with test strips. Once the papers and darkroom have been calibrated, the first print from a previously measured negative is a success at once.

== Uses ==
- Calibration of printing equipment
- Measuring color saturation by print professionals
- Quantifying the radioactivity of a compound such as radiolabeled DNA as one of the molecular tools for gene study
- Making adjustments so that outputs are consistent with the colors desired in the finished products.
- Ensuring x-ray films are within code-required density ranges and comparing relative material thicknesses in industrial radiography
- Process control of density dot gain, dot area & ink trapping.
- Densitometer readings will be different for different types of printing process & substrates.

== See also ==
- Densitometry
- Density meter
- Microdensitometer
- Spectrophotometer
