= 138P/Shoemaker–Levy =

Periodic comet

Discovery
- Discovered by: C. S. Shoemaker; E. M. Shoemaker; David H. Levy
- Discovery site: Palomar Observatory
- Discovery date: 13 November 1991

Designations
- MPC designation: P/1991 V2; P/1998 O1
- Alternative designations: Shoemaker–Levy 7; 1991 XIX, 1991d1

Orbital characteristics
- Epoch: 16 December 2008 (JD 2454816.5)
- Observation arc: 33.84 years
- Number of observations: 126
- Aphelion: 5.544 AU
- Perihelion: 1.706 AU
- Semi-major axis: 3.625 AU
- Eccentricity: 0.52941
- Orbital period: 6.91 a
- Inclination: 10.079°
- Longitude of ascending node: 309.44°
- Argument of periapsis: 95.558°
- Mean anomaly: 177.91°
- Last perihelion: 24 March 2026; 2 May 2019
- Next perihelion: 18 January 2033
- T_{Jupiter}: 2.830
- Earth MOID: 0.750 AU
- Jupiter MOID: 0.900 AU

Physical characteristics
- Mean radius: 0.8 km (0.50 mi)
- Comet total magnitude (M1): 16.6

138P/Shoemaker–Levy, also known as Shoemaker–Levy 7, is a faint Jupiter-family comet with a 7-year orbit around the Sun. During its 2012 perihelion, the comet brightened to about apparent magnitude 20.5.

There were 4 recovery images of 138P on 8 August 2018 by Pan-STARRS when the comet had a magnitude of about 21.5. The comet came to perihelion on 2 May 2019, and next came to perihelion on 24 March 2026.

Numbered comets
Previous; 137P/Shoemaker-Levy	138P/Shoemaker–Levy	Next; 139P/Väisälä–Oterma
