= 129P/Shoemaker–Levy =

Encke-type comet

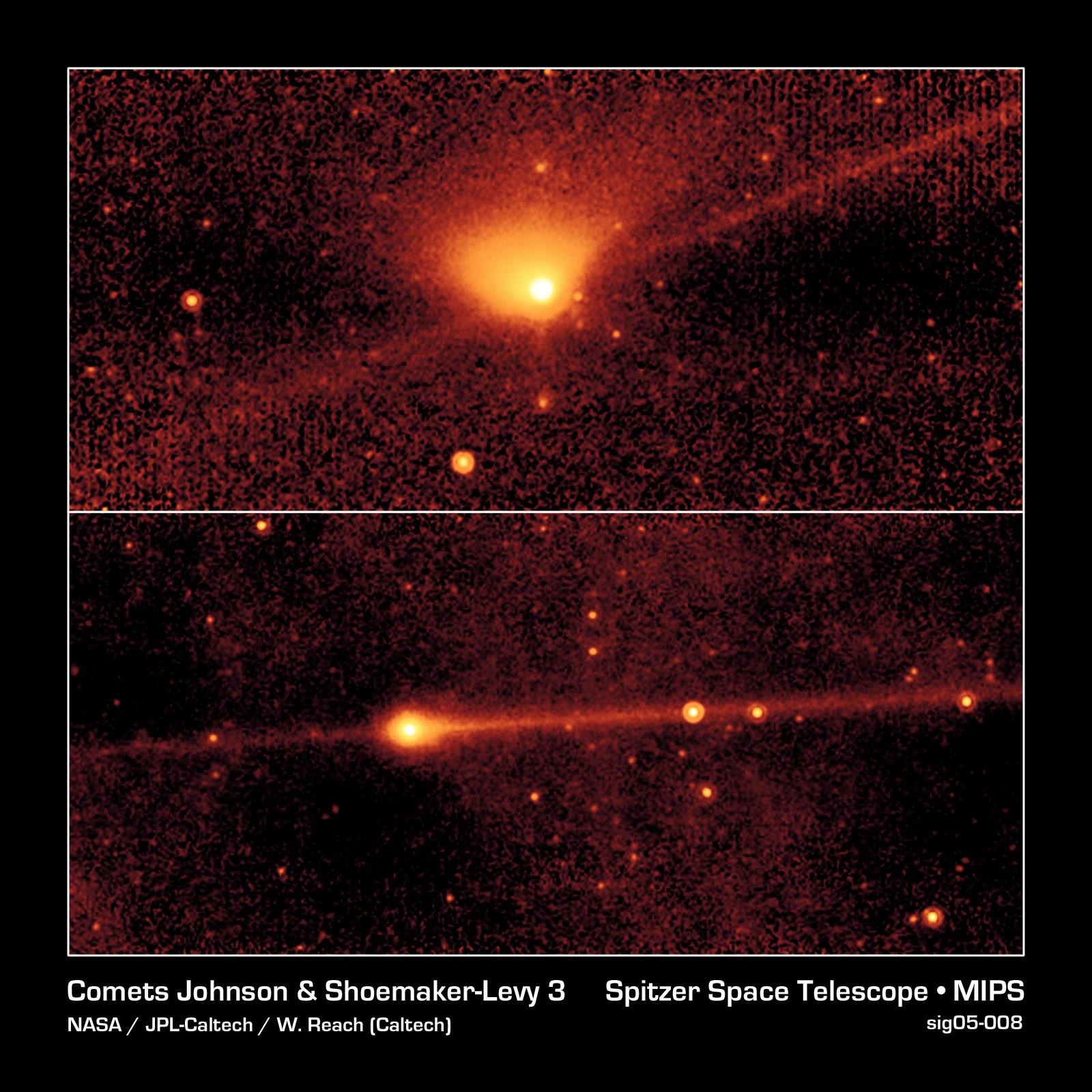
- Comet Shoemaker-Levy 3 (bottom) by Spitzer Space Telescope

Discovery
- Discovered by: Carolyn S. Shoemaker; Eugene M. Shoemaker; David H. Levy
- Discovery date: 7 February 1991

Designations
- MPC designation: P/1991 C1, P/1996 U1
- Alternative designations: Shoemaker–Levy 3; 1990 XXVII, 1991e

Orbital characteristics
- Epoch: 21 November 2025 (JD 2461000.5)
- Observation arc: 34.29 years (Note: Observation arc from the Minor Planet Center database covering dates from 7 February 1991 until 27 May 2025.)
- Number of observations: 992
- Aphelion: 4.664 AU
- Perihelion: 3.925 AU
- Semi-major axis: 4.295 AU
- Eccentricity: 0.08598
- Orbital period: 8.899 years
- Inclination: 3.441°
- Longitude of ascending node: 184.84°
- Argument of periapsis: 307.99°
- Mean anomaly: 119.89°
- Last perihelion: 30 November 2022
- Next perihelion: 5 November 2031
- T_{Jupiter}: 3.017
- Earth MOID: 2.928 AU
- Jupiter MOID: 0.406 AU

Physical characteristics
- Mean radius: 1.22 ± 0.1 km (0.758 ± 0.062 mi)
- Comet total magnitude (M1): 14.4

129P/Shoemaker–Levy, also known as Shoemaker–Levy 3, is an Encke-type comet with an 8.9-year orbit around the Sun. It is also classified as a quasi-Hilda comet.

This comet should not be confused with Comet Shoemaker–Levy 9 (D/1993 F2), which spectacularly crashed into Jupiter in 1994.

== Physical characteristics ==
The nucleus of Comet Shoemaker–Levy 3 is estimated to have a radius of 1.22 ± 0.1 km (0.758 ± 0.062 mi) based on infrared imaging by the Spitzer Space Telescope.

== Notes ==
Numbered comets
Previous; 128P/Shoemaker–Holt	129P/Shoemaker–Levy	Next; 130P/McNaught–Hughes
