= Microdensitometer =

Optical instrument used to measure optical densities in the microscopic domain

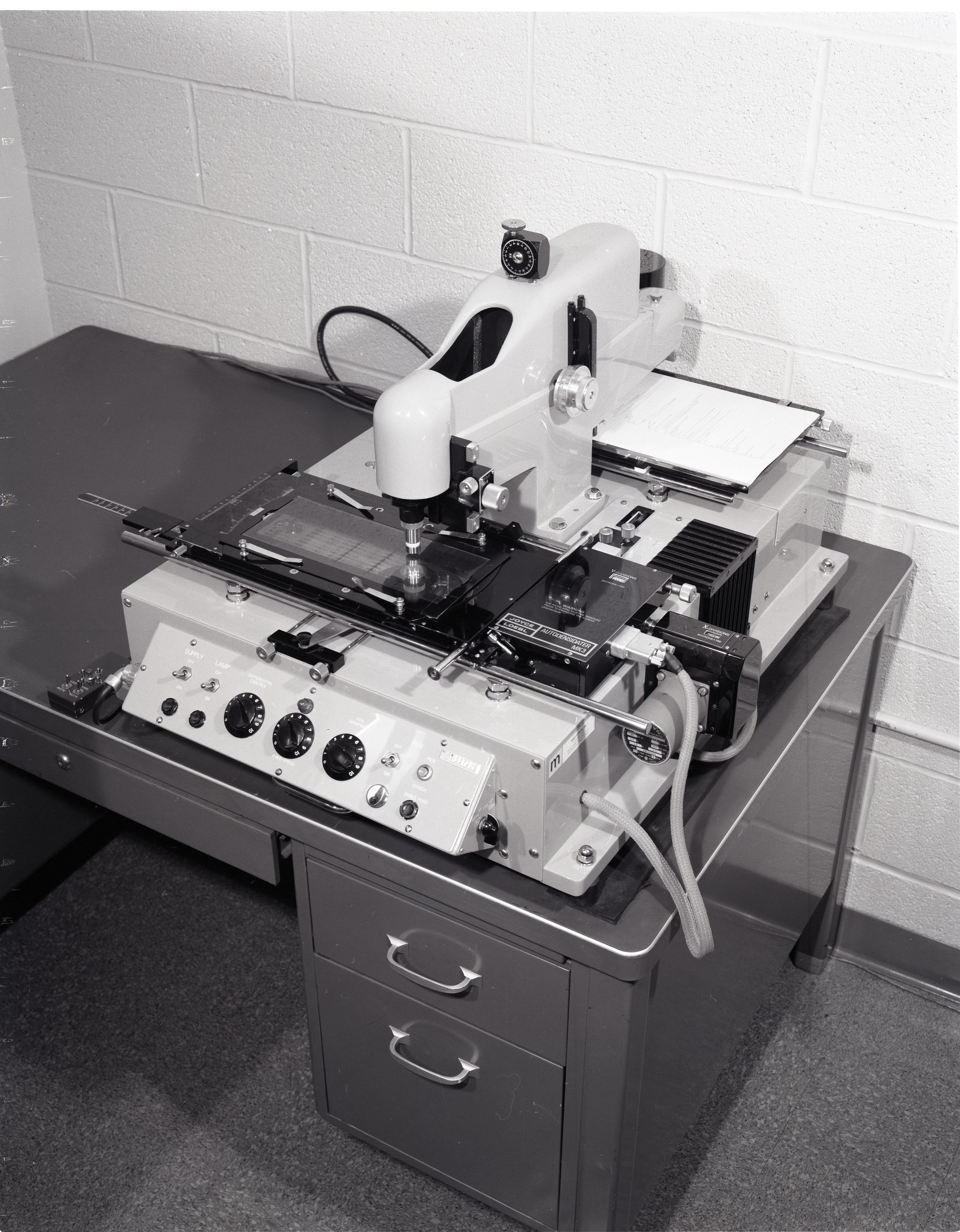
Microdensitometer

A microdensitometer is an optical instrument used to measure optical densities in the microscopic domain. A well-known microdensitometer, used in the photographic industry, is a granularity instrument or granularity machine. The granularity measurement involves the use of an optical aperture, 10-50 micrometers in diameter, and in the recording of thousands of optical density readings. The standard deviation of this series of measurements is known as the granularity of the measured transmission surface, optical film, or photographic film, in particular .

An alternative version to the traditional point-by-point microdensitometer is the beam expanded laser microdensitometer. This instrument can illuminate simultaneously an area a few centimeters wide with an ultra thin height, in the micrometer regime.

== Usefulness ==
Advantages include increased depth of focus, significant increases in data collection speed, and superior signal to noise ratios. In microscopy applications, this type of ultra thin beam-expanded illumination can also be known as light sheet illumination or selective plane illumination.

This measurement technique, using ultra-thin expanded laser beams, is particularly useful to detect microscopic imperfections in optical coatings or transmission optical surfaces.

== See also ==
- Densitometer
- Particle size
- N-slit interferometer
