= C/1991 L3 (Levy) =

Halley-type comet

Discovery
- Discovered by: David H. Levy
- Discovery site: Tucson, Arizona
- Discovery date: 14 June 1991

Designations
- Alternative designations: 1991q, 1991 XI

Orbital characteristics
- Epoch: 29 December 1991 (JD 2448619.5)
- Observation arc: 587 days
- Number of observations: 136
- Aphelion: 26.643 AU
- Perihelion: 0.9827 AU
- Semi-major axis: 13.813 AU
- Eccentricity: 0.9289
- Orbital period: 51.34 years
- Inclination: 19.190°
- Longitude of ascending node: 329.432°
- Argument of periapsis: 41.479°
- Last perihelion: 8 July 1991
- Next perihelion: 30 October 2042
- T_{Jupiter}: 1.517
- Earth MOID: 0.075 AU
- Jupiter MOID: 0.050 AU

Physical characteristics
- Mean radius: 5.8–8.2 km (3.6–5.1 mi)
- Synodic rotation period: 8.34 hours
- Geometric albedo: 0.04 (assumed)
- Comet total magnitude (M1): 8.9
- Apparent magnitude: 7.5 (1991 apparition)

C/1991 L3 (Levy) is a periodic comet discovered by David H. Levy on 14 June 1991. The comet has an orbital period of 51 years and thus fits the definition of Halley-type comets, which have orbital periods between 20 and 200 years.

== Observational history ==
The comet was discovered by David H. Levy from his observatory in Tucson, Arizona, on 14 June 1991. He discovered the comet in the constellation of Pisces, near the galaxy Messier 74, using a 41-cm f/5 reflector telescope. He estimated it had an apparent magnitude of 8 and its coma was three arcminutes across, while no tail was visible. The comet at that point was at a solar elongation of 54° and was located 1.27 AU from Earth.

The presence of the comet was confirmed by M. Koishikawa from Sendai Observatory using a 300mm telephoto lens and the estimated magnitude was 7.5. The next day Alan Hale estimated the comet's magnitude to be 9.6 while C. S. Morris estimated it to be mag 8.5 using binoculars. The closest approach to Earth took place on 17 June, at a distance of 1.27 AU. On that day, David Levy reported the comet was 7.6 mag. and had a sunwards tail about 3 arcminutes long. An image of the comet from 18 June obtained with the Catalina 1.5-m reflector revealed ion streamers, a dust fan, and one or perhaps two dust envelopes. For the rest of the month the comet's magnitude was reported to be between 8.4 and 8.7. During July its magnitude remained constant. The comet passed perihelion on 8 July. C. S. Morris reported the comet on 15 July had a tail 50 arcminutes long with two components.

The comet faded in August as it moved both away from Earth and the Sun and by the end of the month its magnitude was reported to be around 10. The comet continued to fade slowly and was reported to be mag. 13. Its coma was reported to be 1 arcminute across on 17 October. The comet was last observed on 21 January 1993 from Spacewatch, with an estimated magnitude of about 22.

== Orbit ==
The comet has an orbital period of 51.34 years and approaches close to Earth when perihelion is in September. In 1991, both S. Nakano and D. Green suggested that a comet observed in 1499 was a previous apparition of C/1991 L3 (Levy).

During the 2042 apparition the comet is expected to approach Earth at a distance of 0.47±0.07 AU in the second half of November (21±8 November) and at the 2094 apparition it will approach Earth at a distance of 0.44±0.09 AU on 3 August ± 5 days.

== Scientific results ==
The spectrum of the comet obtained on 18 June 1991 from Catalina Station showed the presence of CN, C_{2}, C_{3}, H_{2}O+, and possibly NH_{2}. The comet was observed on 2 February 1992 displaying very minimal coma and a faint anti-tail whose morphology the comet had stopped outgassing. The light curve of the nucleus indicated a rotational period of 8.34 hours. The light curve amplitudes indicated the nucleus was elongated, with a dimensions ratio of 1:1.3 or larger. The effective radius of the nucleus was estimated to be less than 8.2 km (5.1 mi), being 5.8±0.1 kilometers if an albedo of 0.04, the albedo of most cometary nuclei, is assumed.

== Meteors ==
The comet has a minimum orbit intersection distance with Earth of 0.075 AU leading to the assumption that it could create a meteor shower with a theoretical radius near Gamma Pavonis and peaking on 31 August/1 September. The presence of the shower has not been officially confirmed. David Levy mentions that in 2006, meteors that could be attributed to the shower were observed by John Drummond, director of the Royal Astronomical Society of New Zealand. He mentioned the shower produced ten slow moving meteors within the span of 6 nights.
