= Digitized Sky Survey =

Digitized astronomical surveys

- Alternative names: DSS
- Coordinates: 31°16′37″S 149°03′58″E
- Observatory code: 260
- Website: archive.stsci.edu/cgi-bin/dss_form
- Related media on Commons

The Digitized Sky Survey (DSS) is a digitized version of several photographic astronomical surveys of the night sky, produced by the Space Telescope Science Institute between 1983 and 2006.

== Versions and source material ==
The term Digitized Sky Survey originally referred to the publication in 1994 of a digital version of an all-sky photographic atlas used to produce the first version of the Guide Star Catalog. For the northern sky, the National Geographic Society – Palomar Observatory Sky Survey E-band (red, named after the Eastman Kodak IIIa-E emulsion used), provided almost all of the source data (plate code "XE" in the survey). For the southern sky, the J-band (blue, Eastman Kodak IIIa-J) of the ESO/SERC Southern Sky Atlas (known as the SERC-J, code "S") and the "quick" V-band (blue or V in the Johnson–Kron–Cousins system, Eastman Kodak IIa-D) SERC-J Equatorial Extension (SERC-QV, code "XV"), from the UK Schmidt Telescope at the Australian Siding Spring Observatory, were used. Three supplemental plates in the V-band from the SERC and Palomar surveys are included (code "XX"), with shorter exposure times for the fields containing the Andromeda Galaxy, the Large and the Small Magellanic Cloud. The publication of a digital version of these photographic collections has subsequently become known as the First Generation DSS or DSS1.

After the original 1994 publication, more digitizations were made using recently completed photographic surveys, and released as the Second Generation DSS or DSS2. Second Generation DSS consists of three spectra bands, blue, red, and near infrared. The red part was first to complete, and includes the F-band (red, Eastman Kodak IIIa-F) plates from the Palomar Observatory Sky Survey II, made with the Oschin Schmidt Telescope at Palomar Observatory for the northern sky. Red band sources for the southern sky include the short red (SR) plates of the SERC I/SR Survey and Atlas of the Milky Way and Magellanic Clouds (referred to as AAO-SR in DSS2), the Equatorial Red (SERC-ER), and the F-band Second Epoch Survey (referred to as AAO-SES in DSS2, AAO-R in the original literature), all made with the UK Schmidt Telescope at Anglo-Australian Observatory.

== Production ==
The Digitized Sky Survey was produced by the Catalogs and Survey Branch (CASB) of the Space Telescope Science Institute (STScI). They scanned plates using one of two Perkin-Elmer PDS 2020G microdensitometers. The pixel size was 25 ("First Generation", DSS1) or 15 micrometres ("Second Generation", DSS2), corresponding to 1.7 or 1.0 arcseconds in the source material. The scanning resulted in images 14,000 x 14,000 (DSS1) or 23,040 x 23,040 pixels (DSS2) in size, or approximately 0.4 (DSS1) and 1.1 gigabytes (DSS2) each. The scanning of First Generation DSS takes a little under seven hours per plate to complete. Due to the large size of the images, they were compressed using an H-transform algorithm. This algorithm is lossy, but adaptive, and preserves most of the information in the original. Most of the First Generation DSS files were shrunk by a factor of seven. Similar methods were used in the production of the "Second Generation" DSS, but the microdensitometers have since been modified for multi-channel operation, in order to keep the scan time under 12 hours per plate.

The CASB has also published several companion scientific products. The most notable is a photometric calibration of part of the "First Generation" DSS. It allows photometric measurements to be made using the digital northern POSS-E, southern SERC-J, and southern Galactic Plane SERC-V data.

== Publication ==
The compressed version of the First Generation DSS was published by the STScI and the Astronomical Society of the Pacific (ASP) on 102 CD-ROMs in 1994, under the name "Digitized Sky Survey." It has also been made available online by the STScI and several other facilities in databases that can be queried over the web. The moniker "First Generation" was added later.

In 1996, a more highly compressed version of the DSS was published by the STScI and ASP under the name RealSky. RealSky files were compressed by a factor of roughly 100. RealSky consequently took up less space, but the additional compression made it inappropriate for use in photometry and fine detail in the images was degraded.

The Second Generation DSS has appeared steadily over the course of several years. In 2006, the Second Generation DSS (second epoch POSS-II and SES surveys) was finished, and distributed on CD-ROM to partner institutions. Generally, the data are available through WWW services at partner institutions.

== Funding ==
- Association of Universities for Research in Astronomy
- Anglo-Australian Observatory
- Beijing Astronomical Observatory
- Canadian Astronomical Data Center
- Centre de Donnee Stellaire
- European Southern Observatory
- Gemini Observatory
- Hohenkarpfen Observatory
- National Astronomical Observatory of Japan
- Palomar Observatory
- Royal Observatory Edinburgh
- Space Telescope Science Institute

== See also ==
- Guide Star Catalog
- Pan-STARRS
- Sloan Digital Sky Survey
- SkyMapper
- Two Micron All-Sky Survey
