= Malcolm Hartley =

English-born astronomer

Minor planets discovered: 3
(21374) 1997 WS_{22}	24 November 1997	catalogue
(65674) 1988 SM	29 September 1988	catalogue
(251698) 1996 DJ	18 February 1996	catalogue

Malcolm Hartley[mælkəm hɑːtli] (born 15 February 1947, Bury, Greater Manchester) is an English-born astronomer and a discoverer of minor planets and comets, who works with the UK Schmidt Telescope at the Siding Spring Observatory in Australia.

== Career ==
Hartley is best known for his discovery and co-discovery of 10 comets since the 1980s, among them 79P/du Toit-Hartley, 80P/Peters–Hartley, 100P/Hartley, 110P/Hartley, and C/1984 W2. Unfortunately for Hartley, in 2002, "the Anglo-Australian Observatory retrofitted its Schmidt to perform multi-object spectroscopy, essentially halting all astrophotography with the telescope and ending any future possibility for comet discovery". In November 2010, he visited NASA's Jet Propulsion Laboratory facility in California to witness the EPOXI mission flyby of comet 103P/Hartley on 4 November 2010.

Hartley is credited by the Minor Planet Center with the discovery of 3 asteroids made at the Siding Spring Observatory between 1996 and 1998, with (21374) 1997 WS_{22} and (65674) 1988 SM being near-Earth objects of the Amor group of asteroids.

=== Awards and honours ===
The outer main-belt asteroid 4768 Hartley was named in his honour, being deputy astronomer of the UK Schmidt Telescope at Siding Spring, with which this minor planet was discovered. The official naming citation was published by the Minor Planet Center on 27 June 1991 (M.P.C. 18464).

== See also ==
- List of minor planet discoverers § M. Hartley
