= UK Schmidt Telescope =

Telescope in the Siding Spring Observatory, Australia

- Alternative names: United Kingdom Schmidt Telescope
- Location: New South Wales, AUS
- Coordinates: 31°16′20″S 149°04′16″E
- Organization: Australian Astronomical Observatory; Royal Observatory
- First light: June 1973
- Diameter: 1.24 metres (4 ft 1 in)
- Website: www.aao.gov.au/about-us/uk-schmidt-telescope
- Location within Australia

The UK Schmidt Telescope (UKST) is a 1.24 metre Schmidt telescope operated by the Australian Astronomical Observatory (formerly the Anglo-Australian Observatory); it is located adjacent to the 3.9 metre Anglo-Australian Telescope at Siding Spring Observatory, Australia. It is very similar to the Samuel Oschin telescope in California. The telescope can detect objects down to magnitude 21 after an hour of exposure on photographic plates.

It was originally built and operated by the United Kingdom, starting from 1973, and was merged with the former Anglo-Australian Observatory in 1988. It has been wholly operated by Australia since the UK withdrew from the AAO in 2010 (though the name is unchanged).

The UKST is a Schmidt camera, with a design based on the Oschin Schmidt Telescope. It is a survey telescope with a 6° by 6° field of view, originally imaged onto a 35 cm square glass photographic plate, and was the primary source of optical survey data in the southern sky from the 1970s to after 2000. The original sky survey plates were digitally scanned by the Space Telescope Science Institute to create the Guide Star Catalog for the Hubble Space Telescope, and the Digitized Sky Survey.

Although the UKST was originally used to take photographs of the sky, traditional photographic glass (and film) became largely superseded by large electronic CCD detectors in the late 1990s, and after 2000 the UKST was used mostly for multi-object spectroscopy with the 6 degree Field (6dF) instrument. 6dF uses a robot to position up to 150 optical fibres on a metal plate mounted at the focal plane of the UKST, which then carry light from the targets to a spectrograph which sits on the floor of the dome. The 6dF Galaxy Survey (6dFGS), a redshift survey of 120,000 infrared-selected galaxies was completed in 2005, and from 2003–2013 the UKST then carried out the RAdial Velocity Experiment (RAVE) to measure the radial velocities and metallicities of around to 0.5 million stars in the Milky Way Galaxy.

Two new spectroscopic surveys called TAIPAN and Funnelweb are planned post-2015.

== See also ==
- Malcolm Hartley
- Palomar Observatory
- Space Telescope Science Institute
- List of telescopes of Australia
