= David H. Levy =

Canadian-American astronomer and writer (born 1948)

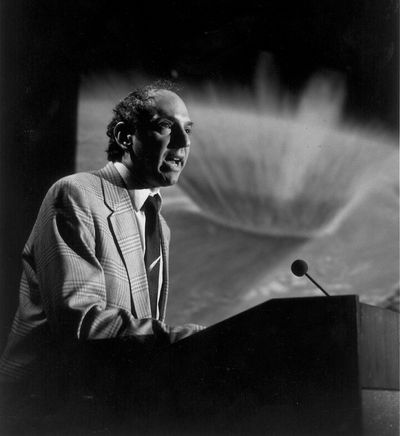
- Levy giving a lecture at JPL in 1994
- Born: May 22, 1948 (age 78); Montreal, Quebec, Canada
- Education: Acadia University (B.A.); Queen's University at Kingston (M.A.); Hebrew University of Jerusalem (Ph.D.)
- Occupations: Astronomer, science writer
- Known for: Co-discovery of Comet Shoemaker–Levy 9
- Spouse: Wendee Esther Wallach-Levy (1997–2022; her death)

David Howard (Doveed) Levy (born May 22, 1948) is a Canadian-American amateur astronomer, science writer, and discoverer of comets and minor planets. He is best known for co-discovering Comet Shoemaker–Levy 9 in 1993, which collided with Jupiter in 1994 in the first observed planetary-scale impact in the Solar System.

== Early life and education ==
Levy was born in Montreal, Quebec, Canada, in 1948. He developed an interest in astronomy at an early age but initially pursued literary studies, earning a Bachelor of Arts and a Master of Arts in English literature from Acadia University and Queen's University at Kingston, respectively.

On February 28, 2011, Levy was awarded a Ph.D. from the Hebrew University of Jerusalem for his thesis "The Sky in Early Modern English Literature: A Study of Allusions to Celestial Events in Elizabethan and Jacobean Writing, 1572–1620."

== Career ==
=== Astronomy ===
Levy has discovered or co-discovered 23 comets, either independently or in collaboration with Gene and Carolyn Shoemaker. He co-discovered the first Mars Trojan asteroid, 5261 Eureka, with Henry E. Holt in June 1990. In total, he has been credited with the discovery of 61 minor planets.

Starting in 2015, Levy began donating his observing logs—kept continuously since 1956—his personal journals dating from 1958, and his comet search records since 1965 to the Linda Hall Library of Science in Kansas City. The observing records are also available online through the Royal Astronomical Society of Canada.

Levy is President of the National Sharing the Sky Foundation and a Master of Astronomy with the DeTao Masters Academy (DTMA).

=== Writing ===
Levy has authored 34 books, predominantly on astronomical subjects. Notable works include The Quest for Comets, a biography of Pluto-discoverer Clyde Tombaugh (2006), and Shoemaker by Levy, a tribute to Gene Shoemaker. He has contributed articles regularly to Sky & Telescope, Parade, Sky News, and Astronomy. His autobiography, A Nightwatchman's Journey: The Road Not Taken, was published in June 2019 by the Royal Astronomical Society of Canada.

=== Broadcasting ===
Levy and his wife Wendee hosted a weekly internet radio talk show on astronomy. The program concluded on February 3, 2011, with a planned "Final Show." Archives remain available in WMA and MP3 formats.

== Personal life ==
Levy lives in Vail, Arizona. He was married to Wendee Esther Wallach-Levy from 1997 until her death in 2022.

== Awards and honors ==
- 1975 – Independent discovery of Nova Cygni 1975
- 1980 – C.A. Chant Medal, Royal Astronomical Society of Canada
- 1990 – G. Bruce Blair Medal
- 1993 – Amateur Achievement Award, Astronomical Society of the Pacific
- 1998 – News & Documentary Emmy Award, "Individual Achievement in a Craft, Writer" category, for the documentary 3 Minutes to Impact (York Films for the Discovery Channel), shared with Martyn Ives, David Taylor, and Benjamin Woolley
- 2007 – Edgar Wilson Award, Smithsonian Astrophysical Observatory, for comet discovery
- 2008 – Co-designed the special edition "Comet Hunter" telescope

The minor planet 3673 Levy was named in his honor.

== Discoveries ==
=== Comets ===
==== Visual discoveries ====
- Comet Levy-Rudenko, 1984t, C/1984 V1, November 14, 1984
- Comet Levy, 1987a, C/1987 A1, January 5, 1987
- Comet Levy, 1987y, C/1987 T1, October 11, 1987
- Comet Levy, 1988e, C/1988 F1, March 19, 1988
- Comet Okazaki-Levy-Rudenko, 1989r, C/1989 Q1, August 25, 1989
- Comet Levy, 1990c, C/1990 K1, May 20, 1990
- Periodic Comet Levy, P/1991 L3, June 14, 1991
- Comet Takamizawa-Levy, C/1994 G1, April 15, 1994
- Periodic Comet 255P/Levy, October 2, 2006

==== Photographic discoveries (with Eugene and Carolyn Shoemaker) ====
- Periodic Comet Shoemaker-Levy 1, 1990o, P/1990 V1
- Periodic Comet Shoemaker-Levy 2, 1990p, 137P/1990 UL3
- Comet Shoemaker-Levy, 1991d, C/1991 B1
- Periodic Comet Shoemaker-Levy 3, 1991e, 129P/1991 C1
- Periodic Comet Shoemaker-Levy 4, 1991f, 118P/1991 C2
- Periodic Comet Shoemaker-Levy 5, 1991z, 145P/1991 T1
- Comet Shoemaker-Levy, 1991a1, C/1991 T2
- Periodic Comet Shoemaker-Levy 6, 1991b1, P/1991 V1
- Periodic Comet Shoemaker-Levy 7, 1991d1, 138P/1991 V2
- Periodic Comet Shoemaker-Levy 8, 1992f, 135P/1992 G2
- Periodic Comet Shoemaker–Levy 9, 1993e, D/1993 F2
- Comet Shoemaker-Levy, 1993h, C/1993 K1
- Comet Shoemaker-Levy, 1994d, C/1994 E2
- Comet Jarnac, P/2010 E2 (David Levy, Wendee Levy, Tom Glinos)

==== Other notable astronomical discoveries ====
- Nova Cygni 1975, August 30, 1975 (independent discovery)
- Nova Cygni 1978, September 12, 1978 (independent discovery)
- Comet Hartley-IRAS (P/1983 V1), November 30, 1983 (independent discovery)
- Comet Shoemaker 1992y, C/1992 U1 (aided in discovery)
- Periodic Comet Shoemaker 4, 1994k, P/1994 J3 (aided in discovery)
- Asteroid 5261 Eureka, the first Martian Trojan asteroid, with Henry E. Holt, June 1990
- Established the cataclysmically recurring nature of 1215-17 TV Corvi (Tombaugh's Star), August 1990

=== Minor planets ===
Minor planets discovered: 61
see § List of discovered minor planets

List of minor planets discovered by David Levy

Name	Discovery Date	Listing
5261 Eureka	20 June 1990	list^{[A]}
5852 Nanette	19 April 1991	list^{[B]}
6398 Timhunter	10 February 1991	list^{[B]}^{[C]}
6401 Roentgen	15 April 1991	list^{[B]}^{[C]}
6485 Wendeesther	25 October 1990	list^{[B]}^{[C]}
6670 Wallach	4 June 1994	list^{[B]}
6715 Sheldonmarks	22 August 1990	list^{[A]}
6914 Becquerel	3 April 1992	list^{[B]}^{[A]}
7344 Summerfield	4 June 1992	list^{[B]}
8021 Walter	22 October 1990	list^{[B]}
8358 Rickblakley	4 November 1989	list^{[B]}
9070 Ensab	23 July 1993	list^{[B]}
9083 Ramboehm	28 November 1994	list^{[B]}
10332 Défi	13 May 1991	list^{[B]}
10346 Triathlon	2 April 1992	list^{[B]}
11548 Jerrylewis	25 November 1992	list^{[B]}
11569 Virgilsmith	27 May 1993	list^{[B]}
11911 Angel	4 June 1992	list^{[B]}
11941 Archinal	23 May 1993	list^{[B]}
13057 Jorgensen	13 November 1990	list^{[B]}
13111 Papacosmas	23 July 1993	list^{[B]}
13123 Tyson	16 May 1994	list^{[B]}
13615 Manulis	28 November 1994	list^{[B]}
14429 Coyne	3 December 1991	list^{[B]}
15276 Diebel	14 April 1991	list^{[B]}
15294 Underwood	7 November 1991	list^{[B]}
15321 Donnadean	13 August 1993	list^{[B]}
15779 Scottroberts	26 July 1993	list^{[B]}
16514 Stevelia	11 November 1990	list^{[B]}
16669 Rionuevo	8 December 1993	list^{[B]}
17493 Wildcat	31 December 1991	list^{[B]}
18368 Flandrau	15 April 1991	list^{[B]}
18434 Mikesandras	12 March 1994	list^{[B]}

Name	Discovery Date	Listing
19980 Barrysimon	22 November 1989	list^{[B]}
20084 Buckmaster	6 April 1994	list^{[B]}
22312 Kelly	14 April 1991	list^{[B]}
22338 Janemojo	3 June 1992	list^{[B]}
24778 Nemsu	24 May 1993	list^{[B]}
24779 Presque Isle	23 July 1993	list^{[B]}
27776 Cortland	25 February 1992	list^{[B]}
27810 Davasobel	23 July 1993	list^{[B]}
29292 Conniewalker	24 May 1993	list^{[B]}
30840 Jackalice	15 April 1991	list^{[B]}
30934 Bakerhansen	16 November 1993	list^{[B]}
30935 Davasobel	8 January 1994	list^{[B]}
32890 Schwob	8 January 1994	list^{[B]}
32897 Curtharris	1 August 1994	list^{[B]}
37588 Lynnecox	15 April 1991	list^{[B]}
37601 Vicjen	3 April 1992	list^{[B]}
43793 Mackey	13 November 1990	list^{[B]}
117032 Davidlane	14 May 2004	list^{[D]}^{[E]}
144769 Zachariassen	19 April 2004	list^{[D]}
144907 Whitehorne	16 December 2004	list^{[D]}^{[E]}
157421 Carolpercy	8 October 2004	list^{[D]}^{[E]}
170909 Bobmasterson	12 December 2004	list^{[D]}
170995 Ritajoewright	3 March 2005	list^{[D]}
175152 Marthafarkas	3 March 2005	list^{[D]}
245158 Thomasandrews	13 October 2004	list^{[D]}
271763 Hebrewu	17 September 2004	list^{[D]}
294727 Dennisritchie	31 January 2008	list^{[D]}
300909 Kenthompson	30 January 2008	list^{[D]}
510045 Vincematteo	4 March 2010	list^{[D]}
518523 Bryanshumaker	16 September 2006	list^{[D]}
Co-discovery made with:^{A} H. E. Holt^{B} C. S. Shoemaker^{C} E. M. Shoemaker^{D} T. Glinos^{E} W. Levy

== See also ==
- Carolyn S. Shoemaker
- Eugene Merle Shoemaker
- List of minor planet discoverers

Preceded by Richard D. Lines & Helen Lines	Amateur Achievement Award of Astronomical Society of the Pacific; 1993	Succeeded by Walter H. Haas
