= Observation arc =

Time between earliest and latest observations of a Solar System body

In observational astronomy, the observation arc (or arc length) of a Solar System body is the time period between its earliest and latest observations, used for tracing the body's path. It is usually given in days or years. The term is mostly used in the discovery and tracking of asteroids and comets. Arc length has the greatest influence on the accuracy of an orbital estimate. The number, spacing of intermediate observations, and timestamps have a lesser effect.

== Short arcs ==
A very short arc leaves a high uncertainty parameter. The object might be in one of many different orbits, at many distances from Earth. In some cases, the initial arc was too short to determine if the object was in orbit around the Earth, or orbiting out in the asteroid belt. With a 1-day observation arc, 2004 PR107 was thought to be a trans-Neptunian dwarf planet, but is now known to be a 1 km main-belt asteroid. With an observation arc of 3 days, 2004 BX159 was thought to be a Mars-crossing asteroid that could be a threat to Earth, but was later found to be another main-belt asteroid.

A relatively modest observation arc may allow finding an older "precovery" photo, immediately providing a much longer arc and a much more precise orbit.

An observation arc less than 30 days can make it difficult to recover an Inner Solar System object more than a year after the last observation, and may result in a lost minor planet. Due to their greater distance from the Sun and slow movement across the sky, trans-Neptunian objects with observation arcs less than several years often have poorly constrained orbits.

As a general rule objects discovered when they are currently farther from the Sun will have greater uncertainties in their initial orbits if the observation arcs are short.

2018 AG37 which was discovered when 100+ AU from the Sun and has only been observed 11 times over 2 years, will require an observation arc of several years to refine the uncertainties in the orbital period and aphelion (farthest distance from the Sun).

1999 DP_{8} with only 4 observations over 1 day, has uncertainties so large that the error bars are not really meaningful and just show that the uncertainties are very large. On its discovery date 1999 DP_{8} is estimated to have been 52±1500 AU from Earth.

Oort cloud comet C/2017 K2 was announced when it had a short 2.6 day observation arc, was estimated to be 20 AU (3.0 billion km) from the Sun, and was estimated to come to perihelion around 10 AU from the Sun in 2027. But it is now known that C/2017 K2 was discovered when it was 16 AU from the Sun and came to perihelion 1.8 AU from the Sun on 19 December 2022.

It took an observation arc of about 200 days to rule out a Mars impact by Oort cloud comet C/2013 A1 (Siding Spring).

== Interstellar objects ==
Interstellar objects generally require an observation arc of 2–3 weeks using hundreds of observations to confirm that an interloper has a hyperbolic excess velocity (interstellar speed) of more than a few km/s. Comet C/2008 J4 (McNaught) was only observed 22 times over an observation arc of 15 days, and due to an insufficient number of observations generates a low inbound interstellar speed of 3.9 km/s, but the uncertainties in the eccentricity easily produce a closed orbit with $e<1$. Comet C/1999 U2 (SOHO) with an almost meaningless observation arc of 1 day shows a very dubious interstellar speed of 17 km/s, but could easily have a closed orbit with an eccentricity as low as 0.7.

== Earth approaches ==
Uncertainty in Earth approach distance by comets currently further than Uranus that have not been observed in the last ~20 years
Comet	Observation arc	Number of observations	Uncertainty parameter	Earth approach date	Uncertainty in distance from Earth	Reference
Comet Swift–Tuttle	257 years	652	0	2126-Aug-05	±10 thousand km	data
C/2001 OG108	0.9 years	886	2	2147-Mar-23	±2 million km	data
C/1991 L3 (Levy)	1.6 years	125	3	2094-Aug-01	±14 million km	data

With an observation arc of 257 years, the uncertainty in Comet Swift–Tuttle's closest approach to Earth on 5 August 2126 is about ±10 thousand km. With an observation arc of ~1 year, the uncertainty in C/2001 OG108's closest approach to Earth on 23 March 2147 is about ±2 million km. Even though C/1991 L3 (Levy) has a longer observation arc than C/2001 OG108, it has significantly fewer observations which generates a greater uncertainty.

In contrast, comet C/2022 A1 (Sarneczky) was discovered on 2 January 2022 when it was 1.3 AU from the Sun, and announced on 7 January 2022 with only a 5-day observation arc. It made its closest Earth approach the next day with a 3-sigma uncertainty region of ±1 million km. The large uncertainty was a result of the short arc and discovery distance.

== See also ==
- Asteroid § Discovery of Ceres
- Precovery
- Uncertainty parameter U
