= List of comets discovered by the LINEAR project =

The following is a list of comets discovered, co-discovered and re-discovered by the Lincoln Laboratory Near-Earth Asteroid Research project (LINEAR), an Earth-based automated sky survey.

In comet nomenclature, the letter before the "/" is either "C" (a non-periodic comet), "P" (a periodic comet), "D" (a comet which has been lost or has disintegrated), "X" (a comet for which no reliable orbit could be calculated — usually historical comets), or "A" for an object that was mistakenly identified as a comet, but is a minor planet.

== Numbered periodic comets ==
Comet	Semimajor axis (AU)	Eccentricity	Period (a)	Discoverer(s) or Namesake
11P/Tempel-Swift-LINEAR	3.4374	0.539	6.37	Tempel, Swift & LINEAR
146P/Shoemaker-LINEAR	4.0267	0.648	8.08	C. Shoemaker, E. Shoemaker & LINEAR
148P/Anderson-LINEAR	3.684	0.538	7.07	Anderson & LINEAR
156P/Russell-LINEAR	3.595	0.559	6.82	Russell & LINEAR
158P/Kowal-LINEAR	4.7207	0.029	10.26	Kowal & LINEAR
160P/LINEAR	3.9734	0.479	7.92	LINEAR
165P/LINEAR	18.0499	0.622	76.69	LINEAR
176P/LINEAR = minor planet 118401 LINEAR	3.1928	0.193	5.71	LINEAR
187P/LINEAR	4.5433	0.164	9.68	LINEAR
188P/LINEAR-Mueller	4.3679	0.416	9.13	LINEAR & Mueller
193P/LINEAR-NEAT	3.5051	0.417	6.56	LINEAR & NEAT
194P/LINEAR	4.0111	0.574	8.03	LINEAR
197P/LINEAR	2.8666	0.63	4.85	LINEAR
204P/LINEAR-NEAT	3.6607	0.47	7	LINEAR & NEAT
209P/LINEAR	2.9378	0.689	5.04	LINEAR
214P/LINEAR	3.6044	0.49	6.84	LINEAR
216P/LINEAR	3.8813	0.445	7.65	LINEAR
217P/LINEAR	3.9422	0.69	7.83	LINEAR
218P/LINEAR	3.304	0.49	6.11	LINEAR
219P/LINEAR	3.6509	0.353	6.98	LINEAR
221P/LINEAR	3.484	0.486	6.5	LINEAR
222P/LINEAR	2.8576	0.727	4.83	LINEAR
225P/LINEAR	3.5453	0.664	6.68	LINEAR
226P/Pigott-LINEAR-Kowalski	3.6895	0.48	7.09	Pigott & LINEAR & Kowalski
227P/Catalina-LINEAR	3.5874	0.499	6.79	Catalina Sky Survey & LINEAR
228P/LINEAR	4.1618	0.176	8.49	LINEAR
230P/LINEAR	3.399	0.563	6.27	LINEAR
231P/LINEAR-NEAT	4.0255	0.247	8.08	LINEAR & NEAT
234P/LINEAR	3.8181	0.252	7.46	LINEAR
235P/LINEAR	4.0004	0.315	8	LINEAR
236P/LINEAR	3.7275	0.509	7.2	LINEAR
237P/LINEAR	3.7368	0.353	7.22	LINEAR
239P/LINEAR	4.4645	0.632	9.43	LINEAR
241P/LINEAR	4.8835	0.619	10.79	LINEAR
247P/LINEAR	3.9918	0.625	7.98	LINEAR
249P/LINEAR	2.7771	0.816	4.63	LINEAR
251P/LINEAR	3.4897	0.51	6.52	LINEAR
252P/LINEAR	3.0568	0.672	5.34	LINEAR
256P/LINEAR	4.6211	0.418	9.93	LINEAR
265P/LINEAR	4.253	0.646	8.77	LINEAR
277P/LINEAR	3.8656	0.504	7.6	LINEAR
285P/LINEAR	4.5127	0.621	9.59	LINEAR
294P/LINEAR	3.194	0.591	5.71	LINEAR
354P/LINEAR	2.2904	0.125	3.47	LINEAR

== Unnumbered periodic comets ==
Comet	Semimajor axis (AU)	Eccentricity	Period (a)	Discoverer(s) or Namesake
P/1998 G1 (LINEAR)	12.098	0.824	42.08	LINEAR
P/1998 VS24 (LINEAR)	4.5041	0.244	9.56	LINEAR
P/1998 Y1 (LINEAR)	22.956	0.923	109.99	LINEAR
P/1999 G1 (LINEAR)	28.139	0.856	149.27	LINEAR
P/1999 S3 (LINEAR)	18.940	0.9	82.43	LINEAR
P/1999 XS87 (LINEAR)	17.386	0.841	72.5	LINEAR
P/2000 G2 (LINEAR)	13.959	0.805	52.15	LINEAR
P/2000 D2 (LINEAR)	17.233	0.867	71.54	LINEAR
P/2000 R2 (LINEAR)	3.3385	0.584	6.1	LINEAR
P/2002 A1 (LINEAR)	16.992	0.723	70.04	LINEAR
P/2002 A2 (LINEAR)	17.103	0.725	70.74	LINEAR
P/2002 B1 (LINEAR)	9.918	0.771	31.24	LINEAR
P/2002 AR2 (LINEAR)	5.3501	0.615	12.38	LINEAR
P/2002 EJ57 (LINEAR)	6.4901	0.594	16.53	LINEAR
P/2002 T5 (LINEAR)	6.9897	0.437	18.48	LINEAR
P/2003 F1 (LINEAR)	20.664	0.806	93.93	LINEAR
P/2003 HT15 (LINEAR)	4.6211	0.418	9.93	LINEAR
P/2003 O3 (LINEAR)	3.1047	0.599	5.47	LINEAR
P/2002 CE10 (LINEAR)	9.816	0.791	30.75	LINEAR
P/2003 R1 (LINEAR)	19.7	0.893	87.44	LINEAR
P/2003 U1 (LINEAR)	22.897	0.922	109.56	LINEAR
P/2003 W1 (LINEAR)	25.148	0.934	126.12	LINEAR
P/2004 WR9 (LINEAR)	6.0617	0.684	14.92	LINEAR
P/2005 Q4 (LINEAR)	4.4594	0.607	9.42	LINEAR
P/2004 FY140 (LINEAR)	4.9523	0.171	11.02	LINEAR
P/2000 QJ46 (LINEAR)	5.9099	0.673	14.37	LINEAR
P/2008 R3 (LINEAR)	18.425	0.896	79.09	LINEAR
P/2008 WZ96 (LINEAR)	3.3567	0.51	6.15	LINEAR
P/2003 WC7 (LINEAR-Catalina)	5.1859	0.681	11.81	LINEAR & Catalina Sky Survey
P/2004 V5-A (LINEAR-Hill)	7.9506	0.445	22.42	LINEAR & Hill
P/2004 V5-B (LINEAR-Hill)	7.9509	0.445	22.42	LINEAR & Hill
P/2001 BB50 (LINEAR-NEAT)	5.6819	0.587	13.54	LINEAR & NEAT
P/2003 XD10 (LINEAR-NEAT)	3.3423	0.437	6.11	LINEAR & NEAT
P/2004 R3 (LINEAR-NEAT)	3.8367	0.442	7.52	LINEAR & NEAT
P/2004 T1 (LINEAR-NEAT)	3.4722	0.508	6.47	LINEAR & NEAT
P/2001 R6 (LINEAR-Skiff)	4.1146	0.486	8.35	LINEAR & Skiff
P/2000 S4 (LINEAR-Spacewatch)	7.1187	0.682	18.99	LINEAR & Spacewatch
P/2002 T6 (NEAT-LINEAR)	7.6519	0.557	21.17	NEAT & LINEAR
P/2004 DO29 (Spacewatch-LINEAR)	7.4655	0.452	20.40	Spacewatch & LINEAR
P/2010 A5 (LINEAR)	5.1001	0.664	11.52	LINEAR
P/2010 WK (LINEAR)	5.7309	0.692	13.72	LINEAR
P/2011 J3 (LINEAR)	19.602	0.926	86.79	LINEAR

== Non-periodic comets ==
Comet	Semimajor axis (AU)	Axis deviation	Period (Years)	Period deviation	Discoverer(s) or Namesake
C/1998 K2 (LINEAR)	3240	52.318	184,455.18	4467	LINEAR
C/1998 K3 (LINEAR)	1758	935.89	73,714.11	5886	LINEAR
C/1998 K5 (LINEAR)	72.39	0.047674	615.98	0.6085	LINEAR
C/1998 M1 (LINEAR)	432.5	2.5341	8,996.15	79.06	LINEAR
C/1998 M2 (LINEAR)	1219	6.1291	42,590.53	321.1	LINEAR
C/1998 M4 (LINEAR)	1290	945.99	46,320.12	5096	LINEAR
C/1998 M5 (LINEAR)	438.5	0.15405	9,183.52	4.839	LINEAR
C/1998 Q1 (LINEAR)	357.2	4.9832	6,750.69	141.3	LINEAR
C/1998 T1 (LINEAR)	1618	8.9444	65,099.99	539.7	LINEAR
C/1998 U1 (LINEAR)	Hyperbolic trajectory	N/A	N/A	N/A	LINEAR
C/1998 U5 (LINEAR)	102.9	0.050505	1,043.5	0.7684	LINEAR
C/1998 W3 (LINEAR)	Hyperbolic trajectory	N/A	N/A	N/A	LINEAR
C/1999 H3 (LINEAR)	Hyperbolic trajectory	N/A	N/A	N/A	LINEAR
C/1999 J3 (LINEAR)	1619	62.789	65,157.78	3790	LINEAR
C/1999 J4 (LINEAR)	Hyperbolic trajectory	N/A	N/A	N/A	LINEAR
C/1999 K3 (LINEAR)	234	10.838	3,578.59	248.7	LINEAR
C/1999 K4 (LINEAR)	16.99	16.019	70.04	99.05	LINEAR
C/1999 K5 (LINEAR)	Hyperbolic trajectory	N/A	N/A	N/A	LINEAR
C/1999 K6 (LINEAR)	346.6	0.40589	6,452.54	11.33	LINEAR
C/1999 K7 (LINEAR)	696.9	268.92	18,396.74	1065	LINEAR
C/1999 K8 (LINEAR)	Hyperbolic trajectory	N/A	N/A	N/A	LINEAR
C/1999 L2 (LINEAR)	392.8	24.671	7,784.77	733.4	LINEAR
C/1999 L3 (LINEAR)	77.59	0.071417	683.46	0.9436	LINEAR
C/1999 N4 (LINEAR)	Hyperbolic trajectory	N/A	N/A	N/A	LINEAR
C/1999 S4 (LINEAR)	Hyperbolic trajectory	N/A	N/A	N/A	LINEAR
C/1999 T2 (LINEAR)	Hyperbolic trajectory	N/A	N/A	N/A	LINEAR
C/1999 T3 (LINEAR)	Hyperbolic trajectory	N/A	N/A	N/A	LINEAR
C/1999 Y1 (LINEAR)	Hyperbolic trajectory	N/A	N/A	N/A	LINEAR
C/2000 B2 (LINEAR)	4670	4462.8	319,184.79	4575	LINEAR
C/2000 CT54 (LINEAR)	1924	5.9824	84,452.9	11.955	LINEAR
C/2000 H1 (LINEAR)	Hyperbolic trajectory	N/A	N/A	N/A	LINEAR
C/2000 K1 (LINEAR)	Hyperbolic trajectory	N/A	N/A	N/A	LINEAR
C/2000 K2 (LINEAR)	500.2	0.45053	11,185.94	15.11	LINEAR
C/2000 SV74 (LINEAR)	Hyperbolic trajectory	N/A	N/A	N/A	LINEAR
C/2000 U5 (LINEAR)	Hyperbolic trajectory	N/A	N/A	N/A	LINEAR
C/2000 WM1 (LINEAR)	Hyperbolic trajectory	N/A	N/A	N/A	LINEAR
C/2001 A1 (LINEAR)	266.6	3.8162	4,354.02	93.48	LINEAR
C/2001 A2 (LINEAR)	Broke up into 2 pieces	N/A	N/A	N/A	LINEAR
C/2001 A2-A (LINEAR)	2531	389.86	127,299.13	2942	LINEAR
C/2001 A2-B (LINEAR)	1119	3.497	37,412.96	175.4	LINEAR
C/2001 B1 (LINEAR)	Hyperbolic trajectory	N/A	N/A	N/A	LINEAR
C/2001 C1 (LINEAR)	50,450	10277	11,330,295.09	346300	LINEAR
C/2001 HT50 (LINEAR-NEAT)	1193	0.34415	41,231.67	17.83	LINEAR & NEAT
C/2001 K5 (LINEAR)	11,450	79.677	1,225,514	1279	LINEAR
C/2001 N2 (LINEAR)	Hyperbolic trajectory	N/A	N/A	N/A	LINEAR
C/2001 RX14 (LINEAR)	Hyperbolic trajectory	N/A	N/A	N/A	LINEAR
C/2001 U6 (LINEAR)	1155	5.6789	39,247.77	289.5	LINEAR
C/2001 W1 (LINEAR)	1832	485.46	78,408.39	3117	LINEAR
C/2001 X1 (LINEAR)	587.9	18.611	14,254.47	676.9	LINEAR
C/2002 A3 (LINEAR)	Hyperbolic trajectory	N/A	N/A	N/A	LINEAR
C/2002 B2 (LINEAR)	1431	275.95	54,126.68	1566	LINEAR
C/2002 B3 (LINEAR)	Hyperbolic trajectory	N/A	N/A	N/A	LINEAR
C/2002 C2 (LINEAR)	8703	288.29	811,933.34	4034	LINEAR
C/2002 H2 (LINEAR)	281.3	3.676	4,719.05	92.49	LINEAR
C/2002 J5 (LINEAR)	Hyperbolic trajectory	N/A	N/A	N/A	LINEAR
C/2002 K2 (LINEAR)	775.7	9.4479	21,603.34	394.7	LINEAR
C/2002 O7 (LINEAR)	Hyperbolic trajectory	N/A	N/A	N/A	LINEAR
C/2002 Q2 (LINEAR)	56.01	7.6034	419.18	85.36	LINEAR
C/2002 Q3 (LINEAR)	broke up into C/2002 Q3-A(?)	N/A	N/A	N/A	LINEAR
C/2002 Q3-A (LINEAR)	Hyperbolic trajectory	N/A	N/A	N/A	LINEAR
C/2002 Q5 (LINEAR)	Hyperbolic trajectory	N/A	N/A	N/A	LINEAR
C/2002 T7 (LINEAR)	Hyperbolic trajectory	N/A	N/A	N/A	LINEAR
C/2002 U2 (LINEAR)	Hyperbolic trajectory	N/A	N/A	N/A	LINEAR
C/2002 V2 (LINEAR)	5342	67.337	390,450.67	7383	LINEAR
C/2002 VQ94 (LINEAR)	202.2	0.015608	2,874.52	0.3329	LINEAR
C/2002 X1 (LINEAR)	1386	1.3899	51,595.58	77.62	LINEAR
C/2003 G1 (LINEAR)	Hyperbolic trajectory	N/A	N/A	N/A	LINEAR
C/2003 G2 (LINEAR)	446.6	87.536	9,437.87	2775	LINEAR
C/2003 H1 (LINEAR)	2664	5.3848	137,483.59	416.9	LINEAR
C/2003 H2 (LINEAR)	38.18	0.055072	235.88	0.5104	LINEAR
C/2003 K4 (LINEAR)	Hyperbolic trajectory	N/A	N/A	N/A	LINEAR
C/2003 L2 (LINEAR)	154.5	0.045287	1,919.66	0.8443	LINEAR
C/2003 O1 (LINEAR)	Hyperbolic trajectory	N/A	N/A	N/A	LINEAR
C/2003 S3 (LINEAR)	Hyperbolic trajectory	N/A	N/A	N/A	LINEAR
C/2003 S4 (LINEAR)	Broke up into 2 pieces	N/A	N/A	N/A	LINEAR
C/2003 S4-A (LINEAR)	36.87	0.47048	223.87	4.285	LINEAR
C/2003 S4-B (LINEAR)	40.05	0.58193	253.44	5.524	LINEAR
C/2003 T2 (LINEAR)	6455	758.84	518,660.88	9146	LINEAR
C/2003 T4 (LINEAR)	Hyperbolic trajectory	N/A	N/A	N/A	LINEAR
C/2003 V1 (LINEAR)	604.7	3.2609	14,869.96	120.3	LINEAR
C/2003 WT42 (LINEAR)	Hyperbolic trajectory	N/A	N/A	N/A	LINEAR
C/2004 B1 (LINEAR)	Hyperbolic trajectory	N/A	N/A	N/A	LINEAR
C/2004 DZ61 (Catalina-LINEAR)	45.79	0.0058809	309.81	0.05969	Catalina Sky Survey & LINEAR
C/2004 F2 (LINEAR)	151.7	0.44695	1,867.59	8.256	LINEAR
C/2004 G1 (LINEAR)	1632	7854.7	65,917.03	47590	LINEAR
C/2004 H1 (LINEAR)	Hyperbolic trajectory	N/A	N/A	N/A	LINEAR
C/2004 K3 (LINEAR)	57.69	0.68721	438.14	7.829	LINEAR
C/2004 L1 (LINEAR)	864.1	1.8829	25,401.29	83.02	LINEAR
C/2004 L2 (LINEAR)	788.3	0.83336	22,135.17	35.1	LINEAR
C/2004 RG113 (LINEAR)	700.5	1.4528	18,538.55	57.68	LINEAR
C/2004 U1 (LINEAR)	3613	33.915	217,208.65	3058	LINEAR
C/2004 X2 (LINEAR)	1458	38.72	55,647.67	2217	LINEAR
C/2004 X3 (LINEAR)	Hyperbolic trajectory	N/A	N/A	N/A	LINEAR
C/2004 YJ35 (LINEAR)	12,900	1294.2	1,466,036	22050	LINEAR
C/2005 A1 (LINEAR)	Hyperbolic trajectory	N/A	N/A	N/A	LINEAR
C/2005 G1 (LINEAR)	19,580	835.79	2,739,676.1	17540	LINEAR
C/2005 H1 (LINEAR)	46.24	0.02928	314.43	0.2986	LINEAR
C/2005 K2 (LINEAR)	Hyperbolic trajectory	N/A	N/A	N/A	LINEAR
C/2005 Q1 (LINEAR)	Hyperbolic trajectory	N/A	N/A	N/A	LINEAR
C/2005 R4 (LINEAR)	2067	8.7033	93,985.77	593.6	LINEAR
C/2005 YW (LINEAR)	190.4	0.11001	2,627.7	2.277	LINEAR
C/2006 M1 (LINEAR)	153.8	0.039307	1,907.67	0.7313	LINEAR
C/2006 S2 (LINEAR)	Hyperbolic trajectory	N/A	N/A	N/A	LINEAR
C/2006 VZ_{13} (LINEAR)	Hyperbolic trajectory	N/A	N/A	N/A	LINEAR
C/2006 X1 (LINEAR)	Hyperbolic trajectory	N/A	N/A	N/A	LINEAR
C/2006 XA1 (LINEAR)	251.9	0.26311	3,997.71	6.264	LINEAR
C/2007 D1 (LINEAR)	Hyperbolic trajectory	N/A	N/A	N/A	LINEAR
C/2007 D3 (LINEAR)	650.3	1.7638	16,585.49	67.47	LINEAR
C/2007 G1 (LINEAR)	Hyperbolic trajectory	N/A	N/A	N/A	LINEAR
C/2007 JA21 (LINEAR)	Hyperbolic trajectory	N/A	N/A	N/A	LINEAR
C/2007 M3 (LINEAR)	170.8	0.071448	2,231.54	1.401	LINEAR
C/2007 O1 (LINEAR)	Hyperbolic trajectory	N/A	N/A	N/A	LINEAR
C/2007 U1 (LINEAR)	Hyperbolic trajectory	N/A	N/A	N/A	LINEAR
C/2007 W3 (LINEAR)	Hyperbolic trajectory	N/A	N/A	N/A	LINEAR
C/2007 Y1 (LINEAR)	Hyperbolic trajectory	N/A	N/A	N/A	LINEAR
C/2008 H1 (LINEAR)	51.65	0.089237	371.25	0.9621	LINEAR
C/2008 R3 (LINEAR)	18.42	0.0043322	79.09	0.02789	LINEAR
C/2008 X3 (LINEAR)	43.79	0.031971	289.74	0.3173	LINEAR
C/2009 B2 (LINEAR)	41.84	0.093958	270.64	0.09116	LINEAR
C/2009 T3 (LINEAR)	4330	63.411	284,950.6	6259	LINEAR
C/2010 R1 (LINEAR)	Hyperbolic trajectory	N/A	N/A	N/A	LINEAR
C/2010 S1 (LINEAR)	Hyperbolic trajectory	N/A	N/A	N/A	LINEAR
C/2011 F1 (LINEAR)	3974	161.92	250,547.03	1531	LINEAR
C/2011 J2 (LINEAR)	Hyperbolic trajectory	N/A	N/A	N/A	LINEAR
C/2011 J3 (LINEAR)	19.60	0.05808	86.79	0.3857	LINEAR
C/2011 M1 (LINEAR)	Hyperbolic trajectory	N/A	N/A	N/A	LINEAR
C/2011 O1 (LINEAR)	1243	2.9855	43,838.65	157.9	LINEAR
C/2011 UF305 (LINEAR)	Hyperbolic trajectory	N/A	N/A	N/A	LINEAR
C/2012 A2 (LINEAR)	971.7	0.62181	30,291.58	29.08	LINEAR
C/2012 K5 (LINEAR)	774.2	0.33548	21,541.62	14	LINEAR
C/2012 L1 (LINEAR)	766.9	0.81674	21,236.37	33.93	LINEAR
C/2012 L2 (LINEAR)	564.5	0.51295	13,411.27	18.28	LINEAR
C/2012 L3 (LINEAR)	330.8	1.7457	6,016.5	47.63	LINEAR
C/2012 V2 (LINEAR)	605.3	0.40643	14,892.73	15	LINEAR
C/2012 X1 (LINEAR)	152.9	0.064	1,891.12	1.187	LINEAR
C/2012 Y1 (LINEAR)	37.95	0.043821	233.82	0.405	LINEAR

== See also ==
- List of periodic comets
- List of non-periodic comets
- Minor Planet Center
