= Comet Kowal =

Comet Kowal, or Kowal's Comet, may refer to any of the comets discovered by American astronomer, Charles T. Kowal, below:

- 99P/Kowal 1
- 104P/Kowal 2

It may also be a partial reference to comets he had co-discovered with other astronomers:

- 134P/Kowal–Vávrová
- 143P/Kowal–Mrkos
- 158P/Kowal–LINEAR

Additionally, he is also the discoverer of a comet that is also recognized as a centaur:

- 95P/Chiron
