= Origin of water on Earth =

Hypotheses for the possible sources of the water on Earth

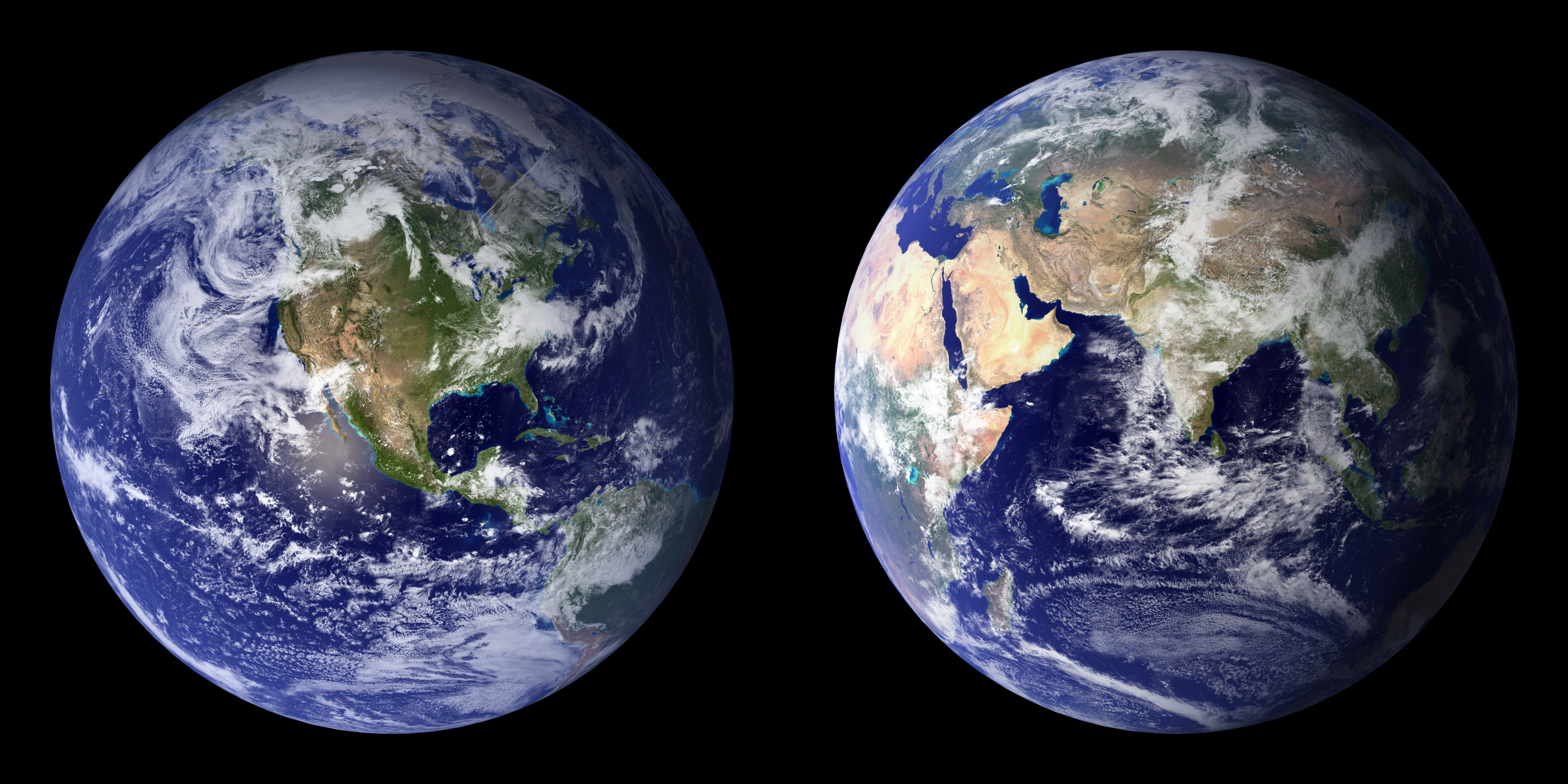
Water covers about 71% of Earth's surface.

Life timeline
← / Earth formed; ← / Earliest water; ← / LUCA; ← / Earliest fossils; ← / Great Oxygenation Event; ← / Sexual reproduction; ← / Earliest fungi; ← / Neoproterozoic oxygenation event; ← / Ediacaran biota; ← / Cambrian explosion; ← / Earliest tetrapods; ← / Earliest hominoid
(million years ago)

The Earth is unique among known planets in having oceans of liquid water on its surface. It was long thought that Earth's water did not originate from the planet's regions of the protoplanetary disk. Instead, it was hypothesized that water and other volatiles must have been delivered to Earth from the outer Solar System later in its history. Recent research, however, indicates that hydrogen inside the Earth played a role in the formation of the ocean. The two ideas are not mutually exclusive, as there is also evidence that water was delivered to Earth by impacts from icy planetesimals similar in composition to asteroids in the outer edges of the asteroid belt.

Liquid water, necessary for all known life, continues to exist on Earth's surface because the planet is at a distance (the habitable zone) from the Sun that allows it to retain water without freezing.

== History of water on Earth ==
One factor in estimating when water appeared on Earth is that water continually escapes into space. H_{2}O molecules in the atmosphere are broken up by photolysis, and the resulting free hydrogen atoms can sometimes escape Earth's gravitational pull. When the Earth was younger and less massive, water would have been lost to space more easily. Lighter elements like hydrogen and helium are expected to leak from the atmosphere continually, but isotopic ratios of heavier noble gases in the modern atmosphere suggest that even the heavier elements in the early atmosphere were subject to significant losses. In particular, xenon is useful for calculations of water loss over time. Not only is it a noble gas (and therefore is not removed from the atmosphere through chemical reactions with other elements), but comparisons between the abundances of its nine stable isotopes in the modern atmosphere reveal that the Earth lost an amount of water approximately equal to the modern ocean volume early in its history. This is likely to have occurred between the Hadean and Archean eons in cataclysmic events such as the moon forming impact.

Any water on Earth during the latter part of its accretion would have been disrupted by the Moon-forming impact (~4.5 billion years ago), which likely vaporized much of Earth's crust and upper mantle and created a rock-vapor atmosphere around the young planet. The rock vapor would have condensed within two thousand years, leaving behind hot volatiles which probably resulted in a majority carbon dioxide atmosphere with hydrogen and water vapor. Afterward, liquid water oceans may have existed despite the surface temperature of 230 °C (446 °F) due to the increased atmospheric pressure of the CO_{2} atmosphere. As the cooling continued, most CO_{2} was removed from the atmosphere by subduction and dissolution in ocean water, but levels oscillated wildly as new surface and mantle cycles appeared.

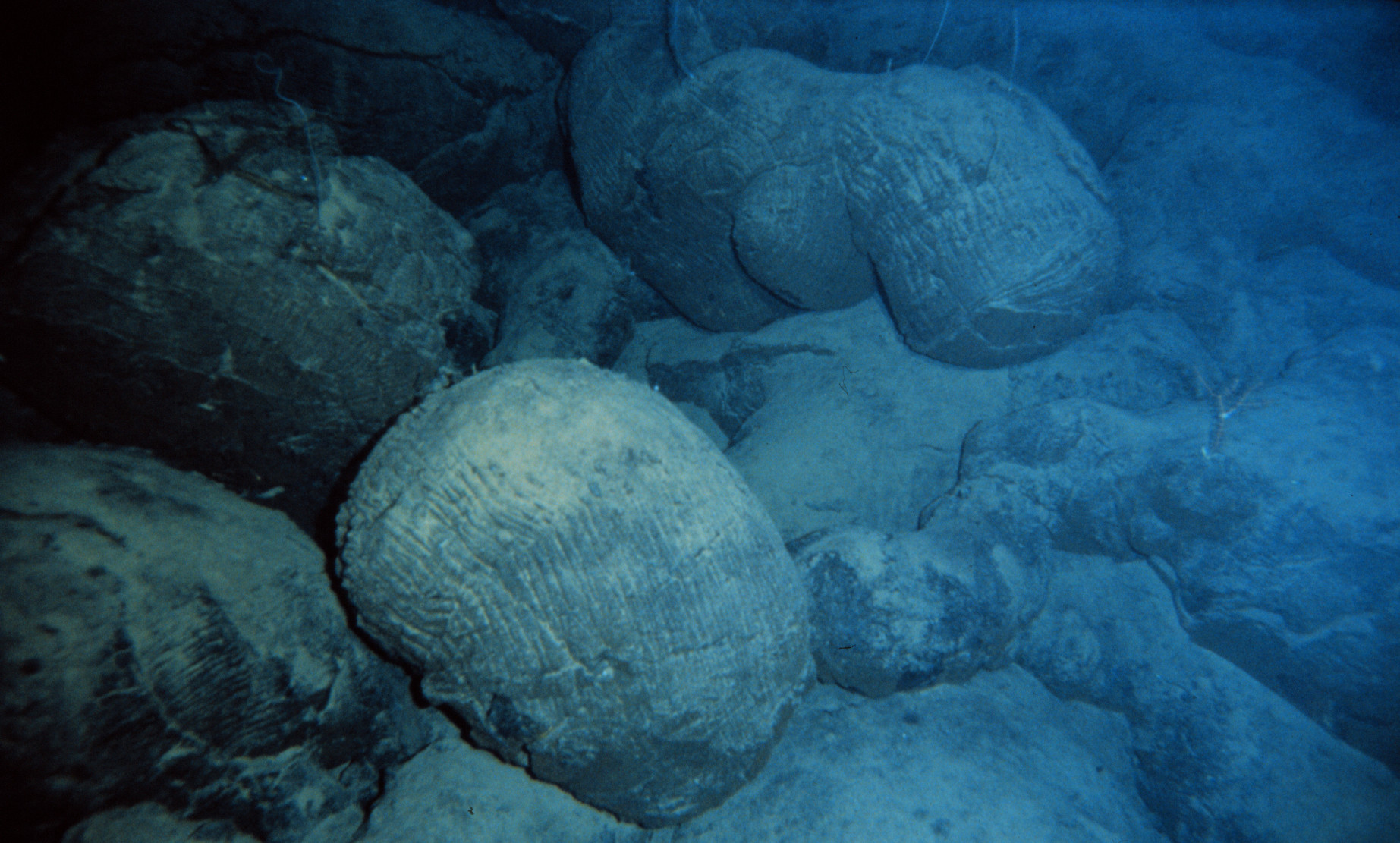
This pillow basalt on the seafloor near Hawaii was formed when magma extruded underwater. Other, much older pillow basalt formations provide evidence for large bodies of water long ago in Earth's history.

Geological evidence also helps constrain the time frame for liquid water existing on Earth. A sample of pillow basalt (a type of rock formed during an underwater eruption) was recovered from the Isua Greenstone Belt and provides evidence that water existed on Earth 3.8 billion years ago. In the Nuvvuagittuq Greenstone Belt, Quebec, Canada, rocks dated at 3.8 billion years old by one study and 4.28 billion years old by another show evidence of the presence of water at these ages. If oceans existed earlier than this, any geological evidence has yet to be discovered (which may be because such potential evidence has been destroyed by geological processes like crustal recycling). More recently, in August 2020, researchers reported that sufficient water to fill the oceans may have always been on the Earth since the beginning of the planet's formation.

Unlike rocks, minerals called zircons are highly resistant to weathering and geological processes and so are used to understand conditions on the very early Earth. Mineralogical evidence from zircons has shown that liquid water and an atmosphere must have existed 4.404 ± 0.008 billion years ago, very soon after the formation of Earth. This presents somewhat of a paradox, as the cool early Earth hypothesis suggests temperatures were cold enough to freeze water between about 4.4 billion and 4.0 billion years ago. Other studies of zircons found in Australian Hadean rock point to the existence of plate tectonics as early as 4 billion years ago. If true, that implies that rather than a hot, molten surface and an atmosphere full of carbon dioxide, early Earth's surface was much as it is today (in terms of thermal insulation). The action of plate tectonics traps vast amounts of CO_{2}, thereby reducing greenhouse effects, leading to a much lower surface temperature and the formation of solid rock and liquid water.

== Earth's water inventory ==
Where water is found on earth and in what proportions

While the majority of Earth's surface is covered by oceans, those oceans make up just a small fraction of the mass of the planet. The mass of Earth's oceans is estimated to be 1.37 × 10^{21} kg, which is 0.023% of the total mass of Earth, 6.0 × 10^{24} kg. An additional 5.0 × 10^{20} kg of water is estimated to exist in ice, lakes, rivers, groundwater, and atmospheric water vapor. A significant amount of water is also stored in Earth's crust, mantle, and core. Unlike molecular H_{2}O that is found on the surface, water in the interior exists primarily in hydrated minerals or as trace amounts of hydrogen bonded to oxygen atoms in anhydrous minerals. Hydrated silicates on the surface transport water into the mantle at convergent plate boundaries, where oceanic crust is subducted underneath continental crust. While it is difficult to estimate the total water content of the mantle due to limited samples, approximately three times the mass of the Earth's oceans could be stored there. Similarly, the Earth's core could contain four to five oceans' worth of hydrogen.

While not considered to be one of the major sources of water on the planet, it should also be noted that biological processes such as photosynthesis and respiration are key factors in the hydrologic cycling of water on earth. These processes may have also had a more vital role on the early earth, and as such, they could impact the amount of available water present in a given location at a given time. This is due to one of these aforementioned processes consuming water, and the other generating water, and the balance between them is therefore what truly determines their impact. If photosynthesis occurs in higher degrees than respiration, earth's water inventory would decrease, while if respiration occurs in higher degrees than photosynthesis, earth's water inventory would increase.

== Hypotheses for the origins of Earth's water ==
=== Within Earth itself ===
Miozzi, et al., (2025) propose that a hydrogen-infused magma ocean could have presented on Earth itself at ambient temperatures over 4000 K. The experiments of Miozzi, et al., (2025) find that copious amounts of hydrogen can dissolve into a magma melt at 4000 K, with a lesser dependence on pressures, from 16 to 60 GPa. Further, the reduction of iron oxide by hydrogen leads to the production of significant amounts of water, along with the formation of iron blebs.

=== Extraplanetary sources ===
Water has a much lower condensation temperature than other materials that compose the terrestrial planets in the Solar System, such as iron and silicates. The region of the protoplanetary disk closest to the Sun was very hot early in the history of the Solar System, with temperatures ranging from 500-1500 Kelvin or 200-1200 Celsius, and therefore, it is not feasible that oceans of water condensed with the Earth as it formed. Further from the young Sun where temperatures were lower, water could condense and form icy planetesimals, which accumulated to form the Oort cloud. The boundary of the region where ice could form in the early Solar System is known as the frost line (or snow line), and is located in the modern asteroid belt, between about 2.7 and 3.1 astronomical units (AU) from the Sun. It is therefore necessary that objects forming beyond the frost line–such as comets, trans-Neptunian objects, and water-rich meteoroids (protoplanets)–delivered water to Earth. However, the timing of this delivery is still in question.

One hypothesis claims that Earth accreted (gradually grew by accumulation of) icy planetesimals about 4.5 billion years ago, when it was 60 to 90% of its current size. In this scenario, Earth was able to retain water in some form throughout accretion and major impact events. This hypothesis is supported by similarities in the abundance and the isotope ratios of water between the oldest known carbonaceous chondrite meteorites and meteorites from Vesta, both of which originate from the Solar System's asteroid belt. It is also supported by studies of osmium isotope ratios, which suggest that a sizeable quantity of water was contained in the material that Earth accreted early on. Measurements of the chemical composition of lunar samples collected by the Apollo 15 and 17 missions further support this, and indicate that water was already present on Earth before the Moon was formed.

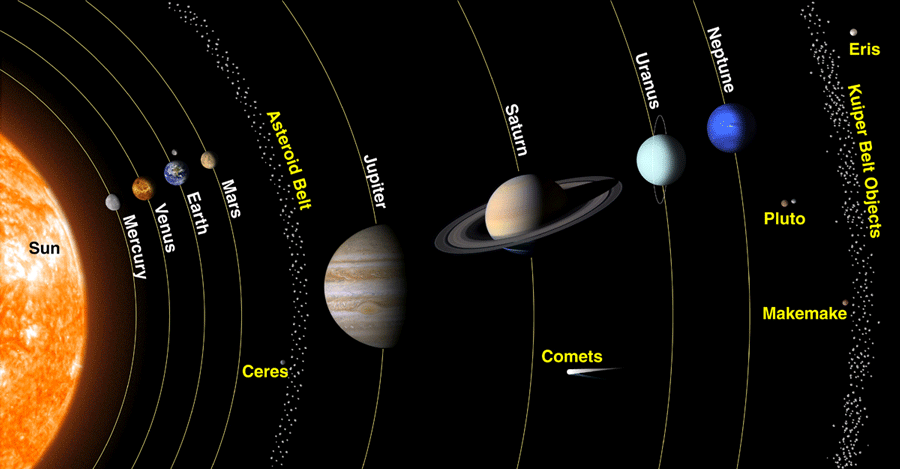
The solar system's layout can help explain why incoming icy planetesimals from the outer solar system can be filtered out by the gaseous planets before they can reach the terrestrial planets.

One problem with this hypothesis is that the noble gas isotope ratios of Earth's atmosphere are different from those of its mantle, which suggests they were formed from different sources. To explain this observation, a so-called "late veneer" theory has been proposed in which water was delivered much later in Earth's history, after the Moon-forming impact. However, the current understanding of Earth's formation allows for less than 1% of Earth's material accreting after the Moon formed, implying that the material accreted later must have been very water-rich. Models of early Solar System dynamics have shown that icy asteroids could have been delivered to the inner Solar System (including Earth) during this period if Jupiter migrated closer to the Sun. Jupiter's relatively quick development, however, made it difficult for the inner solar system to receive matter from the outer solar system, limiting the accumulation of water on the terrestrial planets. This is in addition to other factors, such as the conditions for the goldilocks zone, where liquid water, and by extension life as we know it, can exist, as opposed to solid ice forming snowball planets or gaseous water vapor forming gas giants.

Yet a third hypothesis, supported by evidence from molybdenum isotope ratios from a 2019 study, suggests that the Earth gained most of its water from the same interplanetary collision that caused the formation of the Moon. Albeit, as mentioned above, the majority of this water would have remained in a gaseous phase until significant planetary cooling occurred.

The evidence from 2019 shows that the molybdenum isotopic composition of the Earth's mantle originates from the outer Solar System, likely having brought water to Earth. The explanation is that Theia, the planet said in the giant-impact hypothesis to have collided with Earth 4.5 billion years ago forming the Moon, may have originated in the outer Solar System rather than in the inner Solar System, bringing water and carbon-based materials with it.

== Geochemical analysis of water in the Solar System ==
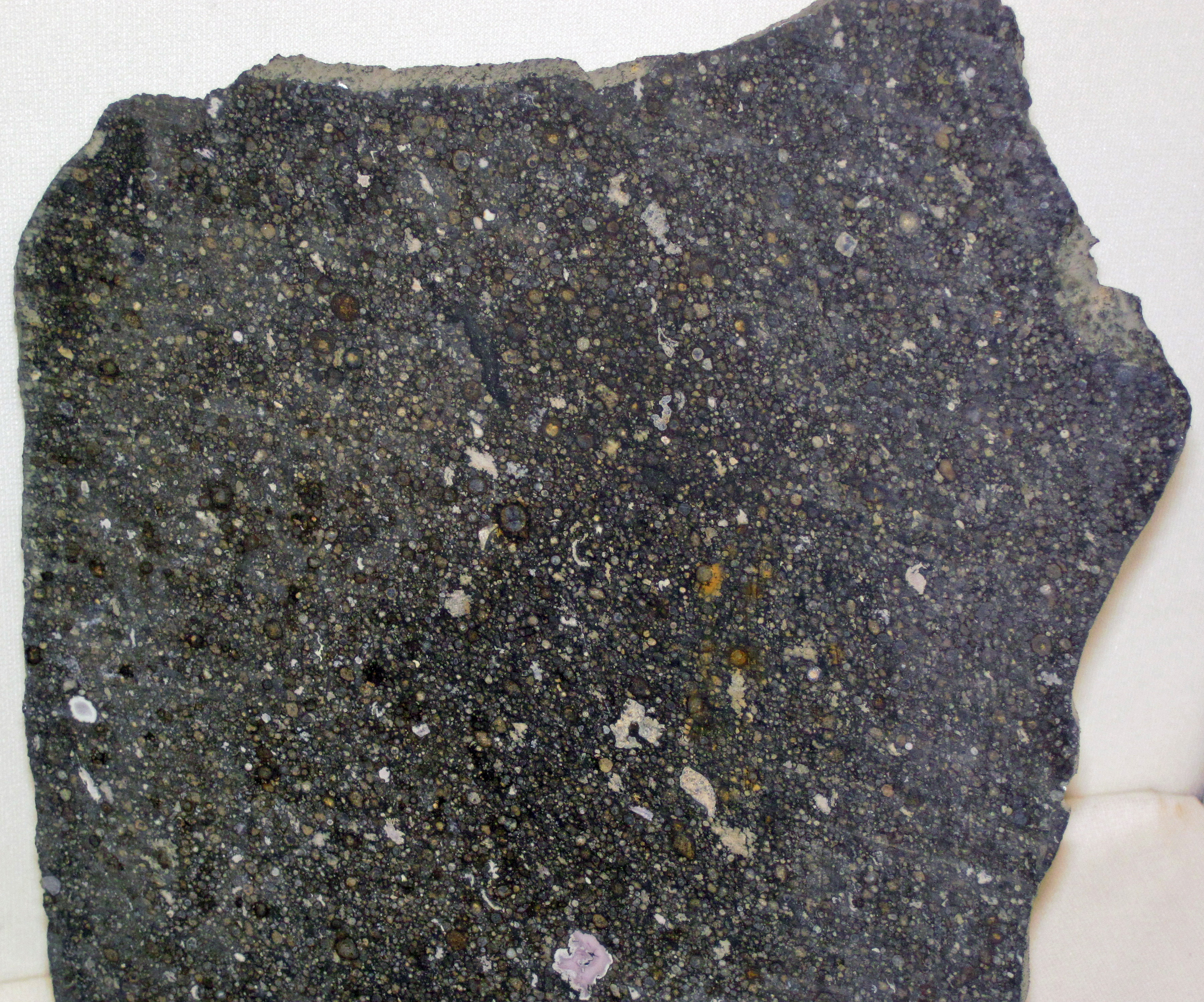
Carbonaceous chondrites such as the Allende Meteorite (above) likely delivered much of the Earth's water, as evidenced by their isotopic similarities to ocean water.

Isotopic ratios provide a unique "chemical fingerprint" that is used to compare Earth's water with reservoirs elsewhere in the Solar System. One such isotopic ratio, that of deuterium to hydrogen (D/H), is particularly useful in the search for the origin of water on Earth. Hydrogen is the most abundant element in the universe, and its heavier isotope deuterium can sometimes take the place of a hydrogen atom in molecules like H_{2}O. Most deuterium was created in the Big Bang or in supernovae, so its uneven distribution throughout the protosolar nebula was effectively "locked in" early in the formation of the Solar System. By studying the different isotopic ratios of Earth and of other icy bodies in the Solar System, the likely origins of Earth's water can be researched.

=== Earth ===
The deuterium to hydrogen ratio for ocean water on Earth is known very precisely to be (1.5576 ± 0.0005) × 10^{−4}. This value represents a mixture of all of the sources that contributed to Earth's reservoirs, and is used to identify the source or sources of Earth's water. The ratio of deuterium to hydrogen has increased over the Earth's lifetime between 2 and 9 times the ratio at the Earth's origin, because the lighter isotope is more likely to leak into space in atmospheric loss processes. Hydrogen beneath the Earth's crust is thought to have a D/H ratio more representative of the original D/H ratio upon formation of the Earth, because it is less affected by those processes. Analysis of subsurface hydrogen contained in recently released lava has been estimated to show that there was a 218‰ higher D/H ratio in the primordial Earth compared to the current ratio. No process is known that can decrease Earth's D/H ratio over time. This loss of the lighter isotope is one explanation for why Venus has such a high D/H ratio, as that planet's water was vaporized during the runaway greenhouse effect and subsequently lost much of its hydrogen to space.

=== Asteroids ===
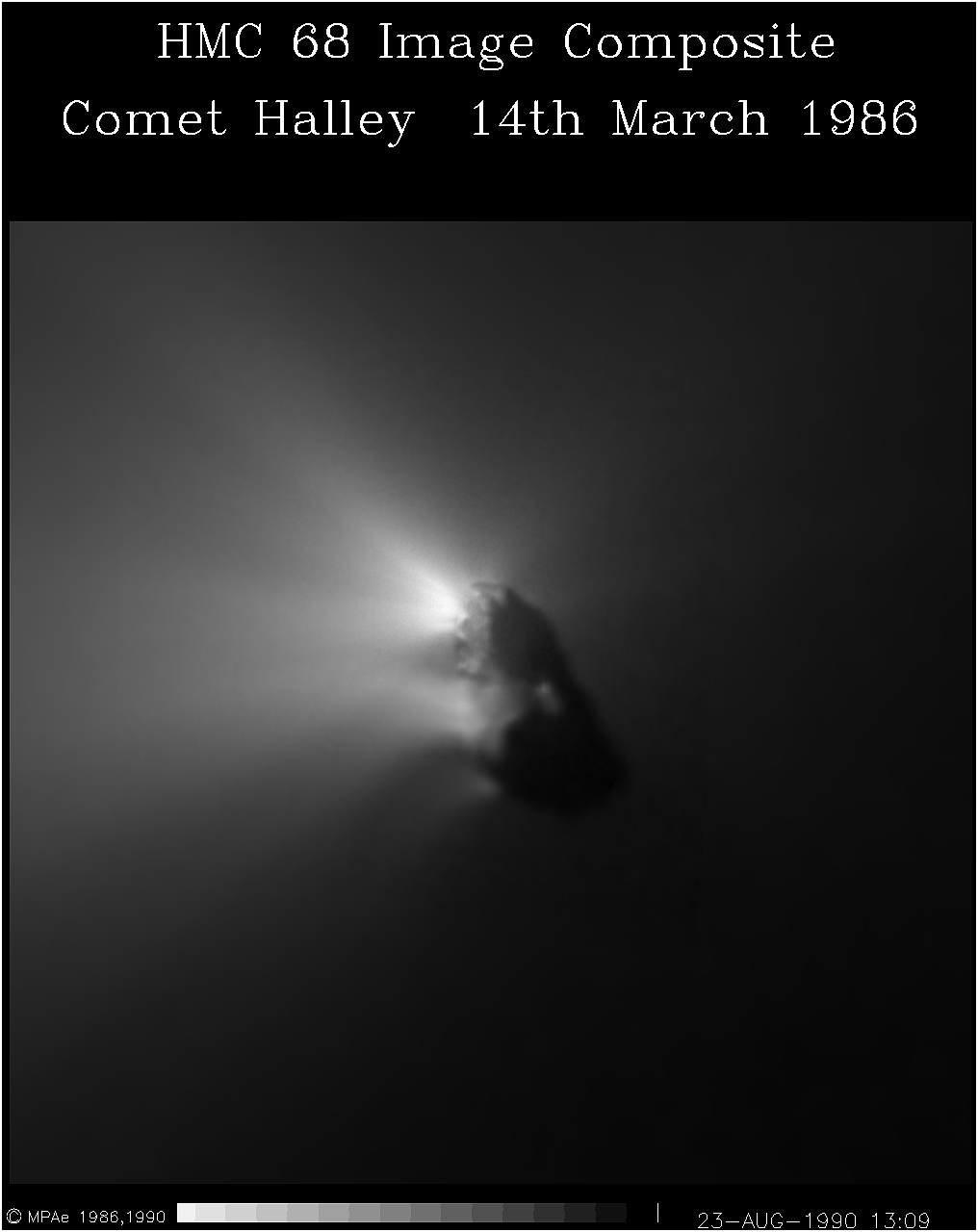
Comet Halley as imaged by the European Space Agency's Giotto probe in 1986. Giotto flew by Halley's Comet and analyzed the isotopic levels of ice sublimating from the comet's surface using a mass spectrometer.

Multiple geochemical studies have concluded that asteroids are most likely the primary source of Earth's water. Carbonaceous chondrites—which are a subclass of the oldest meteorites in the Solar System—have isotopic levels most similar to ocean water. The CI and CM subclasses of carbonaceous chondrites specifically have hydrogen and nitrogen isotope levels that closely match Earth's seawater, which suggests water in these meteorites could be the source of Earth's oceans. Two 4.5 billion-year-old meteorites found on Earth that contained liquid water alongside a wide diversity of deuterium-poor organic compounds further support this. Earth's current deuterium to hydrogen ratio also matches ancient eucrite chondrites, which originate from the asteroid Vesta in the outer asteroid belt. CI, CM, and eucrite chondrites are believed to have the same water content and isotope ratios as ancient icy protoplanets from the outer asteroid belt that later delivered water to Earth.

A further asteroid particle study supported the theory that a large source of Earth's water has come from hydrogen atoms carried on particles in the solar wind which combine with oxygen on asteroids and then arrive on Earth in space dust. Using atom probe tomography the study found hydroxide and water molecules on the surface of a single grain from particles retrieved from the asteroid 25143 Itokawa by the Japanese space probe Hayabusa.

=== Comets ===
Comets are kilometer-sized bodies made of dust and ice that originate from the Kuiper belt (20-50 AU) and the Oort cloud (>5,000 AU), but have highly elliptical orbits which bring them into the inner solar system. Their icy composition and trajectories which bring them into the inner solar system make them a target for remote and in situ measurements of D/H ratios.

It is implausible that Earth's water originated only from comets, since isotope measurements of the deuterium to hydrogen (D/H) ratio in comets Halley, Hyakutake, Hale–Bopp, C/2002 T7 (LINEAR), and 8P/Tuttle, yield values approximately twice that of oceanic water. This is also supported by analysis using the comparison of isotopic ratios for both carbon and nitrogen isotopes, which attribute only a few percent of the water present on Earth to comet sources, indicating a much higher reliance on incoming asteroid matter. Using the cometary D/H ratio, models predict that less than 10% of Earth's water was supplied from comets.

Other, shorter period comets (<20 years) called Jupiter family comets likely originate from the Kuiper belt, but have had their orbital paths influenced by gravitational interactions with Jupiter or Neptune. 67P/Churyumov–Gerasimenko is one such comet that was the subject of isotopic measurements by the Rosetta spacecraft, which found the comet has a D/H ratio three times that of Earth's seawater. Another Jupiter family comet, 103P/Hartley 2, has a D/H ratio which is consistent with Earth's seawater, but its nitrogen isotope levels do not match Earth's.

== See also ==
- Water on terrestrial planets of the Solar System

== Notes ==
- Jörn Müller, Harald Lesch (2003): Woher kommt das Wasser der Erde? - Urgaswolke oder Meteoriten. Chemie in unserer Zeit 37(4), pg. 242 – 246, ISSN 0009-2851
- Parts of this article were translated from the original article from the German Wikipedia, on 4/3/06
