= C/2002 T7 (LINEAR) =

Hyperbolic comet

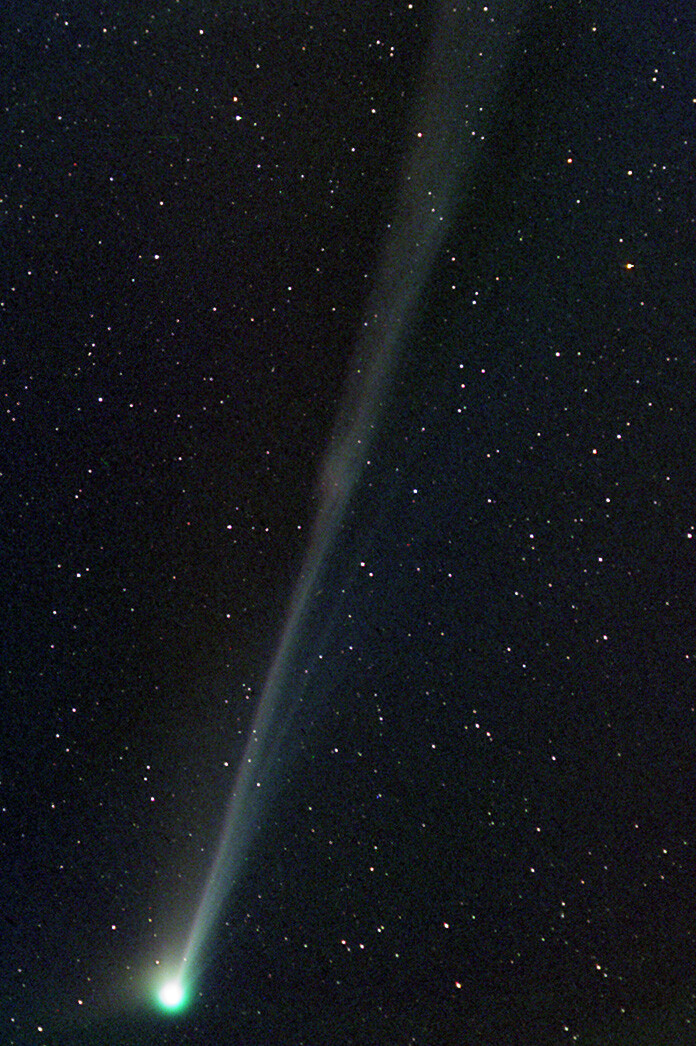
- C/2002 T7 on 27 April 2004 by the Advanced Observing Program of the Kitt Peak Visitor Center

Discovery
- Discovered by: LINEAR
- Discovery date: 14 October 2002

Designations
- Alternative designations: CK02T070

Orbital characteristics
- Epoch: 16 November 2003 (JD 2452959.5)
- Observation arc: 1,242 days
- Earliest precovery date: 12 October 2002
- Number of observations: 4,397
- Perihelion: 0.614 AU
- Eccentricity: 1.000487
- Inclination: 160.58°
- Longitude of ascending node: 94.86°
- Argument of periapsis: 157.74°
- Last perihelion: 23 April 2004
- Earth MOID: 0.2554 AU
- Jupiter MOID: 0.5801 AU

Physical characteristics
- Dimensions: 4.4–8.4 km (2.7–5.2 mi)
- Mean diameter: 6.4 km (4.0 mi)
- Comet total magnitude (M1): 7.6
- Apparent magnitude: 2.2 (2004 apparition)

C/2002 T7 (LINEAR) is a hyperbolic comet discovered in 2002 by the LINEAR project. The comet brightened to a magnitude of 2.2 in 2004.

== Discovery and observations ==
The LINEAR project announced the discovery of this object on 14 October 2002. At that time, comet had a magnitude of 17.5. Before the end of the month, several observatories obtained follow-up observations. On October 29, the International Astronomical Union announced this object to be a comet. Prediscovery observations were found on LINEAR images from October 12. At the time of discovery the comet was 6.9 AU from the Sun. The comet is considered to be dynamically new object from the Oort Cloud and that was the first time it came closer to Sun than Jupiter.

The comet brightened until mid February 2004, when the comet stayed to a magnitude of 7 until early March, when it entered the twilight and it couldn't be easily observed. It passed from a minimum solar elongation of 9° in late March. The comet was observed again on April 9 in twilight, when it had a magnitude of 4.6. The comet passed its perihelion on April 23 but it continued to brighten as it was approaching Earth. The closest approach was on 19 May 2004, when the comet had an estimated magnitude of 2.5 to 3. The comet was visible in the sky along with the equally bright comet C/2001 Q4 (NEAT).

On 30 April 2004, the comet was imaged and studied using the remote-sensing devices on the Rosetta spacecraft. The coma and tail were measured in wavelengths ranging from the ultraviolet to microwave. This occurred from a distance of about 95 million kilometres. The presence of water molecules around the comet was successfully identified.

== See also ==
- List of comets discovered by the LINEAR project
