= 2102 Tantalus =

Near-Earth asteroid

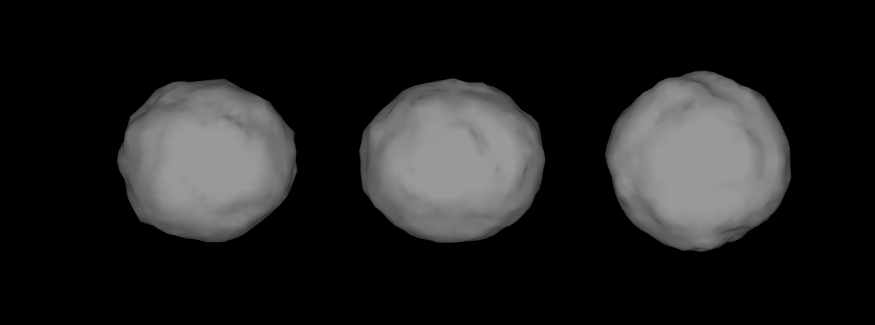
- Light-curve-based 3D-model of 2102 Tantalus

Discovery
- Discovered by: C. Kowal
- Discovery site: Palomar Observatory
- Discovery date: 27 December 1975

Designations
- Pronunciation: /ˈtæntələs/
- Named after: Tantalus
- Alternative designations: 1975 YA
- Minor planet category: PHA

Orbital characteristics
- Epoch 13 January 2016 (JD 2457400.5)
- Uncertainty parameter 0
- Observation arc: 38.63 yr (14111 days)
- Aphelion: 1.675969247626000 AU (250.72143080353 Gm)
- Perihelion: 0.9041343191800040 AU (135.25656897612 Gm)
- Semi-major axis: 1.290051783403 AU (192.9889998898 Gm)
- Eccentricity: .299148816495564
- Orbital period (sidereal): 1.47 yr (535.19 d)
- Mean anomaly: 85.78643003020903°
- Mean motion: 0° 40^{m} 21.563^{s} / day
- Inclination: 64.00535930263230°
- Longitude of ascending node: 94.36993941983230°
- Argument of perihelion: 61.55509931046220°
- Earth MOID: 0.0430913 AU (6.44637 Gm)

Physical characteristics
- Mean diameter: 1.2 ± 0.2 km
- Synodic rotation period: 2.384 h (0.0993 d)
- Spectral type: Q
- Absolute magnitude (H): 16.0

2102 Tantalus (1975 YA) is an Apollo asteroid discovered on 27 December 1975, by C. Kowal at Palomar Observatory. It is a Q-type asteroid.

2102 Tantalus is a potentially hazardous asteroid (PHA) because its minimum orbit intersection distance (MOID) is less than 0.05 AU and its diameter is greater than 150 meters. The Earth-MOID is 0.0439 AU (6,570,000 km; 4,080,000 mi). Its orbit is well-determined for the next several hundred years.

It will pass 0.04439 AU (6,641,000 km; 4,126,000 mi) from Earth on 2038-Dec-27, which is just slightly closer than the 1975-Dec-26 approach of 0.046 AU. The asteroid is about 2–4 km in diameter.

The shape of 2102 Tantalus is estimated to be roughly spherical in outline and fairly symmetrical; the surface is thought to be covered in a fine-grained regolith.
