= International Near-Earth Asteroid Survey =

Astronomical survey

- Target: asteroids

The International Near-Earth Asteroid Survey (INAS) was an astronomical survey, organized and co-ordinated by prolific American astronomer Eleanor Helin during the 1980s. It is considered to be the international extension of the Planet-Crossing Asteroid Survey (PCAS). While PCAS operated exclusively from the U.S. Palomar Observatory in California, INAS attempted to encourage and stimulate worldwide interest in asteroids, and to expand the sky coverage and the discovery and recovery of near-Earth objects around the world.

The IAU's Minor Planet Center credits INAS with the discovery of 8 minor planets in 1986 (compared to 20 discoveries made by PCAS during 1993–1994). One of the discoveries was the 7-kilometer sized main-belt asteroid 4121 Carlin.

== See also ==
- List of near-Earth object observation projects
