= 98P/Takamizawa =

Periodic comet with 7 year orbit

Discovery
- Discovered by: Kesao Takamizawa
- Discovery date: July 30, 1984

Designations
- Alternative designations: 1984 VII; 1991 XIII

Orbital characteristics
- Epoch: March 6, 2006
- Aphelion: 5.932 AU
- Perihelion: 1.663 AU
- Semi-major axis: 3.797 AU
- Eccentricity: 0.5621
- Orbital period: 7.4 a
- Inclination: 10.5567°
- Last perihelion: January 4, 2021; August 5, 2013; March 6, 2006
- Next perihelion: 2028-Apr-27

98P/Takamizawa is a periodic comet in the Solar System.

On 29 June 2188 the comet will pass about 0.34 AU (51,000,000 km; 32,000,000 mi) from Earth.

Numbered comets
Previous; 97P/Metcalf–Brewington	98P/Takamizawa	Next; 99P/Kowal
