= 2594 Acamas =

Trojan asteroid

Discovery
- Discovered by: C. Kowal
- Discovery site: Palomar Obs.
- Discovery date: 4 October 1978

Designations
- Pronunciation: /ˈækəməs/
- Named after: Acamas (Greek mythology)
- Alternative designations: 1978 TB · 1977 RR
- Minor planet category: Jupiter trojan Trojan · background

Orbital characteristics
- Epoch 23 March 2018 (JD 2458200.5)
- Uncertainty parameter 0
- Observation arc: 64.44 yr (23,537 d)
- Aphelion: 5.4911 AU
- Perihelion: 4.6313 AU
- Semi-major axis: 5.0612 AU
- Eccentricity: 0.0849
- Orbital period (sidereal): 11.39 yr (4,159 d)
- Mean anomaly: 242.01°
- Mean motion: 0° 5^{m} 11.76^{s} / day
- Inclination: 5.5341°
- Longitude of ascending node: 356.69°
- Argument of perihelion: 279.28°
- Jupiter MOID: 0.082 AU
- T_{Jupiter}: 2.9840

Physical characteristics
- Mean diameter: 25.87±0.59 km
- Synodic rotation period: 25.954±0.0468 h (R)
- Geometric albedo: 0.060±0.006
- Spectral type: C (assumed)
- Absolute magnitude (H): 11.6; 11.8; 12.31

2594 Acamas /ˈækəməs/ is a mid-sized Jupiter trojan from the Trojan camp, approximately 25 kilometers (16 miles) in diameter. It was discovered on 4 October 1978, by American astronomer Charles Kowal at the Palomar Observatory in California. The dark Jovian asteroid has a longer-than average rotation period of 26 hours and possibly an elongated shape. It was named after the Thracian leader Acamas from Greek mythology.

== Orbit and classification ==
Acamas is a dark Jovian asteroid in a 1:1 orbital resonance with Jupiter. It is located in the trailering Trojan camp at the Gas Giant's L_{5} Lagrangian point, 60° behind on its orbit. It is also a non-family asteroid of the Jovian background population.

It orbits the Sun at a distance of 4.6–5.5 AU once every 11 years and 5 months (4,159 days; semi-major axis of 5.06 AU). Its orbit has an eccentricity of 0.08 and an inclination of 6° with respect to the ecliptic. The body's observation arc begins with a precovery taken at Palomar in September 1953, or 25 years prior to its official discovery observation.

== Physical characteristics ==
Acamas is an assumed, carbonaceous C-type asteroid, while most larger Jupiter trojans are D-type asteroids.

=== Rotation period ===
In September 2013, a rotational lightcurve of Acamas was obtained from photometric observations in the R-band by astronomers at the Palomar Transient Factory in California. Lightcurve analysis gave a rotation period of 25.954±0.0468 hours with a brightness amplitude of 0.50 magnitude (U=2). A high brightness variation typically indicates that the body has an elongated rather than spherical shape.

=== Diameter and albedo ===
According to the survey carried out by the NEOWISE mission of NASA's Wide-field Infrared Survey Explorer, Acamas measures 25.87 kilometers in diameter and its surface has an albedo 0.06, while the Collaborative Asteroid Lightcurve Link assumes a standard albedo for a carbonaceous asteroid of 0.057 and calculates a diameter of 19.21 kilometers based on an absolute magnitude of 12.31.

== Naming ==
This minor planet was named by IAU's Minor Planet Names Committee from Greek mythology after the warrior Acamas (son of Eussorus), ally of Troy and leader of the Thracian contingent during the Trojan War. He was killed by Ajax.

The name was suggested by Frederick Pilcher and published by the Minor Planet Center on 6 February 1993 (M.P.C. 21606).
