= 160P/LINEAR =

Jupiter-family comet

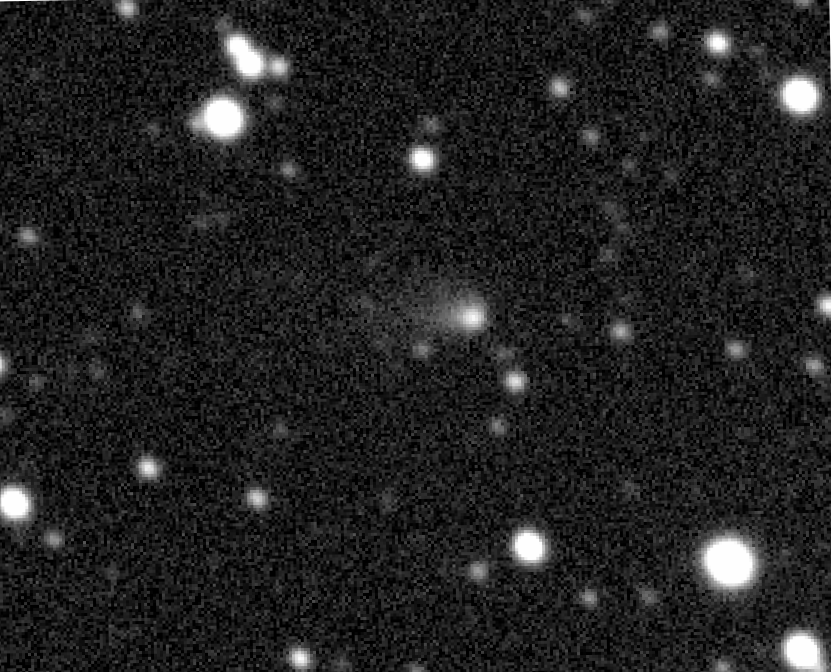
- Comet 160P/LINEAR photographed by the Zwicky Transient Facility on 31 October 2019

Discovery
- Discovered by: LINEAR
- Discovery date: 15 July 2004

Designations
- MPC designation: P/2004 NL_{21}

Orbital characteristics
- Epoch: 21 November 2025 (JD 2461000.5)
- Observation arc: 24.13 years (Note: Observation arc from the Minor Planet Center database covering dates from 8 September 1996 until 25 October 2020.)
- Earliest precovery date: 8 September 1996
- Number of observations: 991
- Aphelion: 5.765 AU
- Perihelion: 1.796 AU
- Semi-major axis: 3.781 AU
- Eccentricity: 0.52491
- Orbital period: 7.35 years
- Inclination: 15.589°
- Longitude of ascending node: 333.32°
- Argument of periapsis: 12.793°
- Mean anomaly: 292.65°
- Last perihelion: 2 December 2019
- Next perihelion: 7 April 2027
- T_{Jupiter}: 2.775
- Earth MOID: 1.067 AU
- Jupiter MOID: 0.081 AU

Physical characteristics
- Mean radius: 0.87 km (0.54 mi)
- Mean density: 500±80 kg/m^{3}
- Comet total magnitude (M1): 6.7
- Comet nuclear magnitude (M2): 16.0

160P/LINEAR is a Jupiter-family comet with a roughly 7.35-year orbit around the Sun. It is one of many comets discovered by the Lincoln Near-Earth Asteroid Research (LINEAR) survey.

== Observational history ==
It was first detected as a faint 19th-magnitude asteroid-like object from LINEAR observations in 15 July 2004. Calculations of its orbit has informed the Minor Planet Center that the object, formerly labeled as 2004 NL_{21}, is a possible new comet. Robert H. McNaught confirmed its cometary nature after detecting some weak activity on 6 September 2004.

The comet later received its official numerical designation (160P) after Maik Meyer confirmed its precovery photographic plates taken by the Near-Earth Asteroid Tracking (NEAT) survey in 1996. It was subsequently re-observed in its next two apparitions in 2012 and 2019 respectively.

== Physical characteristics ==
In 2006, observations from the Isaac Newton Telescope while it was approximately 4.0 AU (600 million km) away from the Sun revealed that its nucleus has an effective radius of roughly 0.87 ± 0.07 km (0.541 ± 0.043 mi). However, the presence of a background galaxy at the time prevented direct measurements of the chemical composition of its surrounding coma.

== Orbit ==
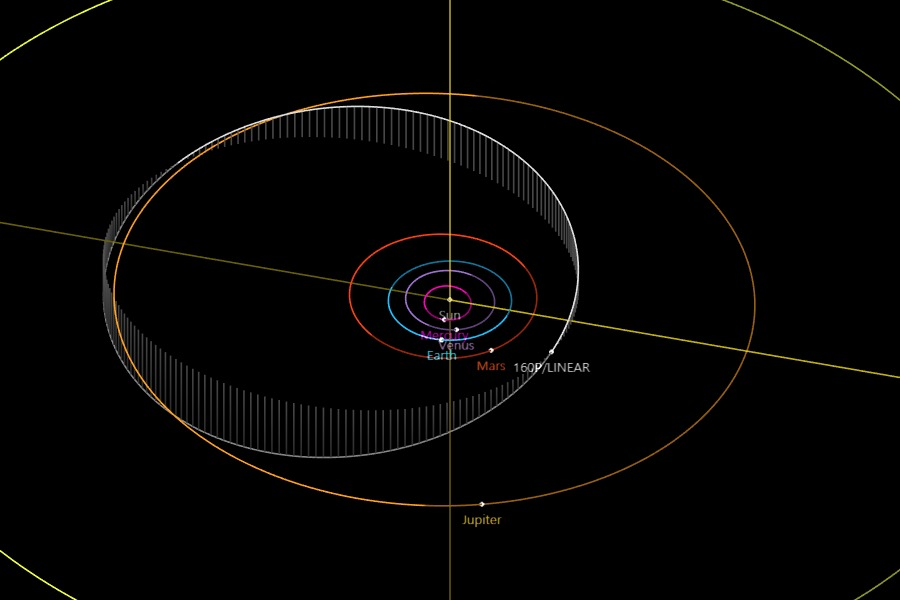
Diagram of the orbit of 160P/LINEAR by the Jet Propulsion Laboratory

== Notes ==
Numbered comets
Previous; 159P/LONEOS	160P/LINEAR	Next; 161P/Hartley–IRAS
