= 1981 Midas =

Apollo asteroid

- Radar images of Midas by the Arecibo Observatory in March 2018

Discovery
- Discovered by: C. Kowal
- Discovery site: Palomar Obs.
- Discovery date: 6 March 1973

Designations
- Pronunciation: /ˈmaɪdəs/
- Named after: Midās (Greek mythology)
- Alternative designations: 1973 EA
- Minor planet category: Apollo; NEO; PHA; Venus-crosser; Mars-crosser

Orbital characteristics
- Epoch 4 September 2017 (JD 2458000.5)
- Uncertainty parameter 0
- Observation arc: 41.97 yr (15,330 days)
- Aphelion: 2.9307 AU
- Perihelion: 0.6212 AU
- Semi-major axis: 1.7759 AU
- Eccentricity: 0.6502
- Orbital period (sidereal): 2.37 yr (864 days)
- Mean anomaly: 256.48°
- Mean motion: 0° 24^{m} 59.4^{s} / day
- Inclination: 39.833°
- Longitude of ascending node: 356.90°
- Argument of perihelion: 267.80°
- Earth MOID: 0.0045 AU (1.8 LD)

Physical characteristics
- Dimensions: 1.95±0.07 km; 3.4 km (outdated)
- Synodic rotation period: 5.22 h
- Geometric albedo: 0.2661 (derived); 0.293±0.025
- Spectral type: SMASS = V; V
- Absolute magnitude (H): 15.18; 15.2; 15.50; 15.6±0.2; 15.96±0.23

1981 Midas, provisional designation 1973 EA, is a vestoid asteroid, classified as a near-Earth object and potentially hazardous asteroid, approximately 2 kilometers in diameter.

It was discovered on 6 March 1973 by American astronomer Charles Kowal at Palomar Observatory in San Diego County, California. It was named after King Midas from Greek mythology.

== Classification and orbit ==
The moderately bright V-type asteroid is also an Apollo asteroid, as well as a Venus and Mars-crosser. The asteroid orbits the Sun at a distance of 0.6–2.9 AU once every 2 years and 4 months (864 days). Its orbit has an eccentricity of 0.65 and an inclination of 40° with respect to the ecliptic.

Midas has a low minimum orbit intersection distance with Earth of 0.0036 AU (540,000 km; 330,000 mi), which corresponds to 1.5 lunar distance (Earth–Moon distance). However, it does not pose an impact risk for the foreseeable future. On 19 March 1947 it passed 0.0298 AU (4,460,000 km; 2,770,000 mi) from Earth. The last notable close approach was on 21 March 2018 passing 0.08957 AU (13,399,000 km; 8,326,000 mi) from Earth and shining at an apparent magnitude of +12.4. The next notable close approach will be on 14 September 2032 passing slightly closer at 0.08635 AU (12,918,000 km; 8,027,000 mi) from Earth. As no precoveries are known, the asteroid's observation arc begins with its discovery observation at Palomar in 1973.

With a semi-major axis of 1.78 AU, when 1 AU from the Sun (and passing Earth's orbit) the asteroid is moving at 35.7 km/s with respect to the Sun. (Note: v = 42.1219 √1/r − 0.5/a, where r is the distance from the Sun, and a is the major semi-axis. Objects move fastest at perihelion and slowest at aphelion.) For comparison Earth orbits the Sun at 30 km/s.

== Physical characteristics ==
Three rotational lightcurves obtained from photometric observations gave a concurring rotation period of 5.24 hours with a relatively high brightness variation of 0.65, 0.8 and 0.87 in magnitude, respectively (U=3/2/3).

According to the survey carried out by the Japanese Akari satellite, Midas measures 1.95 kilometers in diameter and its surface has an albedo of 0.293, while the Collaborative Asteroid Lightcurve Link assumes an albedo of 0.266 and calculates an identical diameter of 1.95 kilometers with an absolute magnitude of 15.6.

In 1987, Midas was also detected by radar from Goldstone Deep Space Communications Complex at a distance of 0.08 AU with a measured maximal radar cross-section of 0.1 km^{2}.

== Naming ==
This minor planet was named after the figure from Greek mythology, Midas, the King of Phrygia, who turned whatever he touched to gold. He received this ability as an award, but soon realized that this gift was a curse when his daughter turned into a statue after he had touched her. Relieved of his power by bathing in the river Pactolus, other accounts also tell his death caused by starvation. The official naming citation was published by the Minor Planet Center on 15 October 1977 (M.P.C. 4237).
