= 2134 Dennispalm =

Main-belt asteroid

Discovery
- Discovered by: C. Kowal
- Discovery site: Palomar Obs.
- Discovery date: 24 December 1976

Designations
- Named after: C. Dennis Palm
- Alternative designations: 1976 YB
- Minor planet category: main-belt

Orbital characteristics
- Epoch 4 September 2017 (JD 2458000.5)
- Uncertainty parameter 0
- Observation arc: 61.16 yr (22,337 days)
- Aphelion: 3.3111 AU
- Perihelion: 1.9594 AU
- Semi-major axis: 2.6353 AU
- Eccentricity: 0.2565
- Orbital period (sidereal): 4.28 yr (1,563 days)
- Mean anomaly: 161.22°
- Mean motion: 0° 13^{m} 49.44^{s} / day
- Inclination: 31.367°
- Longitude of ascending node: 11.606°
- Argument of perihelion: 120.22°

Physical characteristics
- Dimensions: 6.007±0.257
- Synodic rotation period: 4.114 h (0.1714 d); 5.2±0.7
- Geometric albedo: 0.339±0.037
- Spectral type: Tholen = DSU: B–V = 0.936
- Absolute magnitude (H): 13.1

2134 Dennispalm, provisional designation 1976 YB is a main-belt asteroid discovered on 24 December 1976, by Charles T. Kowal at Palomar Observatory.

Photometric observations made in 2003 at the Carbuncle Hill Observatory near Providence, Rhode Island, give a synodic rotation period of 4.114 ± 0.002 hours. The light curve shows a brightness variation of 0.37 ± 0.05 in magnitude.

It is named in honor of C. Dennis Palm (1945–1974), who worked as a night assistant at Caltech's 48" Schmidt telescope on Palomar Mountain in the 1960s and later at Caltech's 60" reflecting telescope, also on Palomar. The official naming citation was published by the Minor Planet Center on 1 July 1979 (M.P.C. 4788).
