= C/2011 J2 (LINEAR) =

Hyperbolic comet

Discovery
- Discovery site: LINEAR (704)
- Discovery date: 4 May 2011

Designations
- Alternative designations: CK11J020

Orbital characteristics
- Epoch: 22 January 2014 (JD 2456679.5)
- Observation arc: 6.52 years
- Earliest precovery date: 10 March 2011
- Number of observations: 6,434
- Orbit type: Oort cloud
- Aphelion: ~49,940 AU (inbound)
- Perihelion: 3.443 AU
- Semi-major axis: ~25,000 AU (inbound)
- Eccentricity: 0.99986 (inbound); 1.00004 (outbound)
- Orbital period: 3.95 million years (inbound)
- Inclination: 122.80°
- Longitude of ascending node: 163.95°
- Argument of periapsis: 85.296°
- Last perihelion: 25 December 2013
- T_{Jupiter}: -1.258
- Earth MOID: 3.004 AU
- Jupiter MOID: 0.551 AU

Physical characteristics
- Mean radius: 1.298 km (0.807 mi)
- Mean density: 440±60 kg/m^{3}
- Comet total magnitude (M1): 7.7
- Comet nuclear magnitude (M2): 10.3

C/2011 J2 (LINEAR) is an Oort cloud comet discovered on 4 May 2011 by LINEAR at an apparent magnitude of 19.7 using a 1 m (39 in) reflecting telescope. The comet reached an apparent magnitude 17.0 on September 2014.

== Observational history ==
C/2011 J2 came to perihelion on 25 December 2013 at a distance of 3.4 AU (510 million km) from the Sun. On 27 August 2014 an 18th magnitude fragment CK11J02b was detected. Preliminary estimates are that a fragmentation event occurred around 14 July 2014 plus/minus ten days. In mid-July 2014 the comet was 3.9 AU (580 million km) from the Sun.

Fragment C was detected in October 2014 by Ernesto Guido, Nick Howes, and Martino Nicolini.

C/2011 J2 is dynamically new. It came from the Oort cloud with a loosely bound chaotic orbit that was easily perturbed by galactic tides and passing stars. Before entering the planetary region (epoch 1800), C/2011 J2 had an orbital period of several million years. After leaving the planetary region (epoch 2200), it will be on an ejection trajectory.
