= 99P/Kowal =

Periodic comet

Discovery
- Discovered by: Charles T. Kowal
- Discovery site: Palomar Observatory
- Discovery date: 24 April 1977

Designations
- MPC designation: P/1977 H2; P/1991 D2
- Alternative designations: Kowal 1; 1977 III, 1992 VI; 1977f, 1991i

Orbital characteristics
- Epoch: 17 October 2024 (JD 2460600.5)
- Observation arc: 47.25 years
- Number of observations: 1,740
- Aphelion: 7.489 AU
- Perihelion: 4.702 AU
- Semi-major axis: 6.095 AU
- Eccentricity: 0.22857
- Orbital period: 15.049 years
- Inclination: 4.339°
- Longitude of ascending node: 28.083°
- Argument of periapsis: 174.59°
- Mean anomaly: 60.356°
- Last perihelion: 12 April 2022
- Next perihelion: 6 May 2037
- T_{Jupiter}: 2.956
- Earth MOID: 3.724 AU
- Jupiter MOID: 0.307 AU

Physical characteristics
- Mean diameter: 10.2 km (6.3 mi)
- Comet total magnitude (M1): 6.7
- Comet nuclear magnitude (M2): 11.5

99P/Kowal, also known as Kowal 1, is a periodic comet in the Solar System that orbits out by Jupiter and has a 15 year orbital period. It has been observed regularly since 2019. Its most recent perihelion occurred in April 2022, and it is expected to return by May 2037.

== Observational history ==
Charles T. Kowal discovered this comet shortly after reporting the discovery of asteroid 2063 Bacchus (then known as 1977 HB) on the night of 24 April 1977. It had already passed perihelion when it was first spotted as a 16th-magnitude object within the constellation Virgo. Orbital calculations by Shuichi Nakano and Brian G. Marsden predicted that the comet has a 15-year orbit around the Sun, and was expected to return by 1992. It was successfully recovered by James V. Scotti from the Kitt Peak Observatory's Spacewatch program on 21 February 1991.

Between 12 and 14 May 2021, a small outburst temporarily brightened Comet Kowal 1, which raised its apparent magnitude from 18.32 to 17.6.

Numbered comets
Previous; 98P/Takamizawa	99P/Kowal	Next; 100P/Hartley
