= List of near-Earth object observation projects =

Projects that observe Near-Earth objects

List of near-Earth object observation projects is a list of projects that observe Near-Earth objects. Most are astronomical surveys intended to find undiscovered asteroids, and they sometimes find comets.

Project	Commissioned	Decommissioned	Description
Anglo-Australian Near-Earth Asteroid Survey	1990	1996	
Asiago-DLR Asteroid Survey	2001	2002	
Asteroid Terrestrial-impact Last Alert System (ATLAS)	2015		
Beijing Schmidt CCD Asteroid Program	1996	2002	Discovered more than 1000 minor planets
Campo Imperatore Near-Earth Object Survey	2001		
Catalina Sky Survey	1998		About 1000 objects per year
EURONEAR	2006		
International Near-Earth Asteroid Survey			
Lincoln Near-Earth Asteroid Research (LINEAR)	1998		
Lowell Observatory Near-Earth-Object Search	1993	2008	
Near Earth Object Surveillance Satellite	2013		Microsatellite observatory
Near-Earth Asteroid Tracking (NEAT)	1995	2007	
NELIOTA	2017	2023	Monitoring project of lunar impact flashes for the determination of the distribution and frequency of small NEOs
NEO Surveyor	2028		Infrared observatory to be located at Sun-Earth L1 Lagrange point
NEOSTEL	2020		Planned ground-based fly-eye survey telescope
NEODyS			Database of near-Earth asteroid orbits
NEOWISE	2009	2024	Infrared survey to identify and characterize the population of near-Earth objects
Orbit@home	2008	2013?	NEO-related distributed computing project
OGS Telescope	1995		
OCA–DLR Asteroid Survey	1996	1999	
Palomar–Leiden survey	1960	1977	
Palomar Planet-Crossing Asteroid Survey	1973	1995	
Palomar Transient Factory	2009	2012	
Pan-STARRS	2008		
Sentinel Space Telescope			Proposed space telescope
Sentry (monitoring system)			
Siding Spring Survey	2004	2013	
Space Situational Awareness Programme	2009		
Spacewatch	1984		
Ukrainian Optical Facilities for Near-Earth Space Surveillance Network			
Vera C. Rubin Observatory	2024		Ground-based survey telescope (under construction)

Annual NEA discoveries by survey: (all NEAs)

Annual NEA discoveries by survey: (NEAs > 1 km)

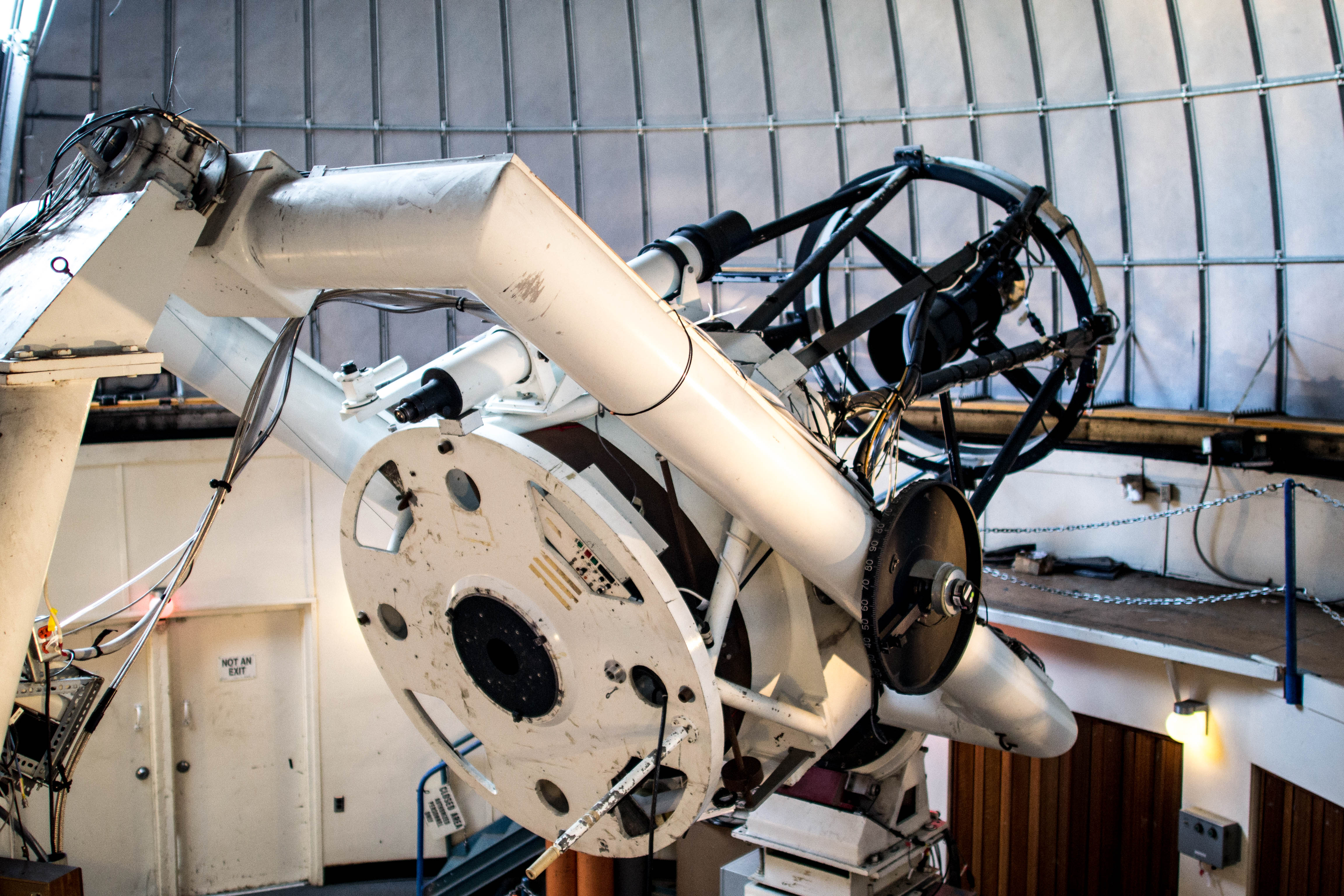
A telescope used by the Catalina Sky Survey

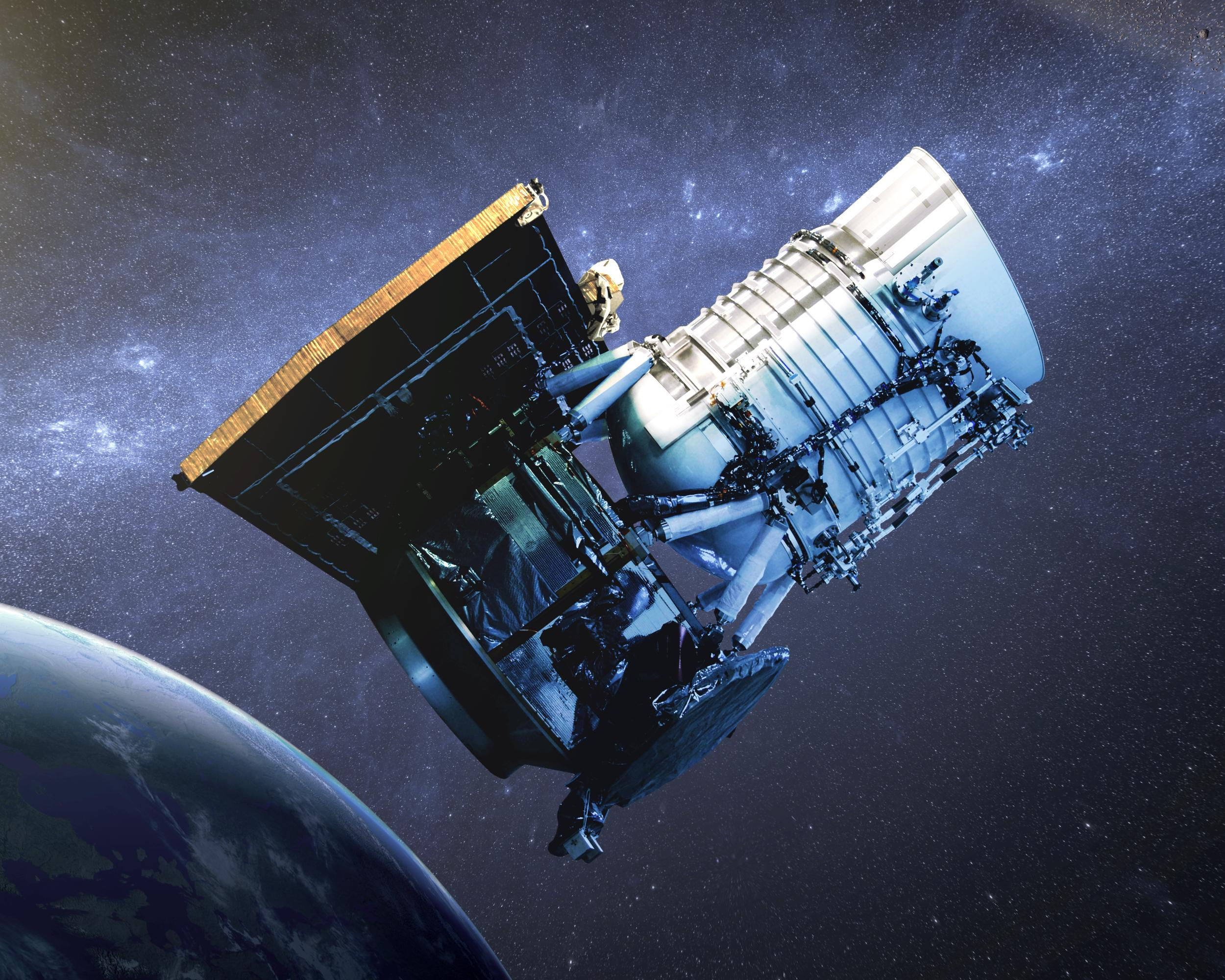
WISE, used for NEOWISE

== See also ==
- List of asteroid close approaches to Earth
- Asteroid impact prediction
- Category:Asteroid surveys
- Space debris
- Astronomical survey
- Timeline of astronomical maps, catalogs, and surveys
- List of asteroid-discovering observatories
