= C/2006 VZ13 (LINEAR) =

Parabolic comet

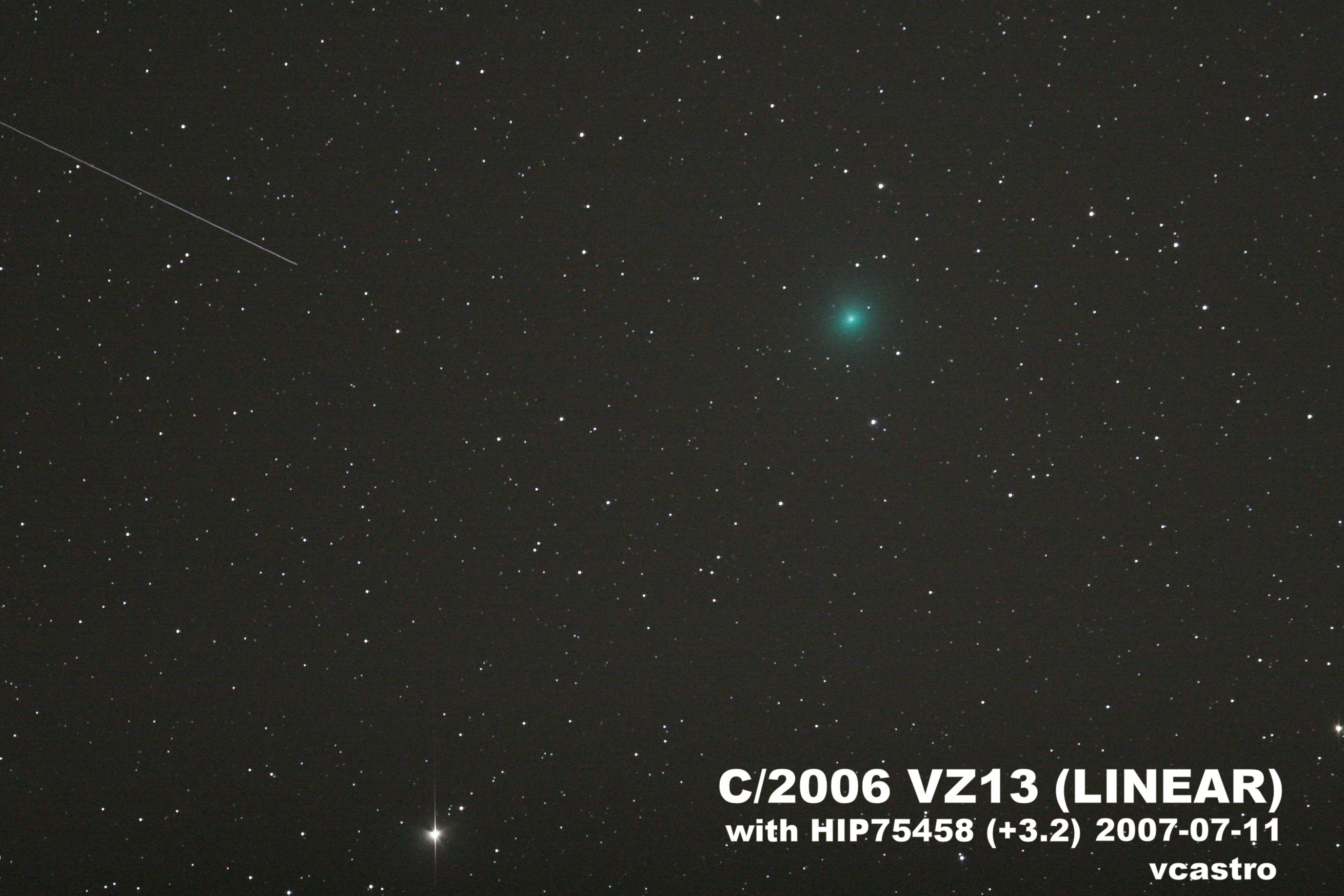
- Comet LINEAR and ι Draconis photographed from Mount Laguna, California on 11 July 2007

Discovery
- Discovery site: LINEAR
- Discovery date: 13 November 2006

Orbital characteristics
- Epoch: 13 June 2007 (JD 2454264.5)
- Observation arc: 274 days
- Number of observations: 1,025
- Perihelion: 1.015 AU
- Eccentricity: 1.000249
- Inclination: 134.79°
- Longitude of ascending node: 66.027°
- Argument of periapsis: 174.12°
- Last perihelion: 10 August 2007
- Earth MOID: 0.0047 AU
- Jupiter MOID: 2.8204 AU

Physical characteristics
- Mean radius: 0.723 km (0.449 mi) (Note: Calculated mean radius using the formula: $\log_{10}\,(\,R\,)\ =\;0.9 +\;0.13 (\,H\,)$ Where $\,H\,$ is the comet's absolute total magnitude (M1))
- Comet total magnitude (M1): 8.0
- Apparent magnitude: 7.5 (2007 apparition)

C/2006 VZ_{13} (LINEAR) is a non-periodic comet discovered by the LINEAR survey on 13 November 2006.

== Discovery and observations ==
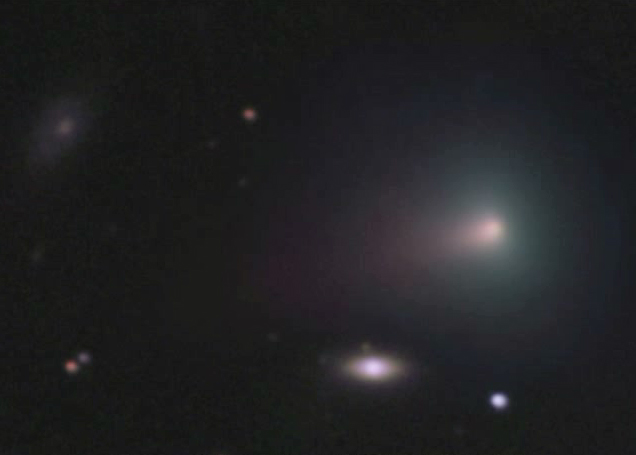
C/2006 VZ_{13} (LINEAR) and NGC 5820 taken by Robert Sharpe at Shuttleview observatory on 14 July 2007.

The object was initially believed to be an asteroid due to its stellar appearance in the early images. However, observers soon detected a small coma and the telltale green cometary cast.

The comet peaked at approximately magnitude +7.5, much brighter than predicted. The comet made its closest approach to Earth on 14 July 2007 at a distance of 0.575 AU (86.0 million km). It reached perihelion on 10 August 2007 at a distance of 1.015 AU (151.8 million km).

== Physical characteristics ==
Infrared measurements from the NASA Infrared Telescope Facility (IRTF) in July 2007 yielded a mean grain temperature of 275±5 K, which was 6 percent higher than the equivalent radiative equilibrium blackbody of the comet at its distance from the Sun, which was approximately 1.02 AU at the time. Spectroscopic observations on the following month reveal that the comet's composition is depleted of carbon compounds, comparable to what was observed from 9P/Tempel.
