= Charles T. Kowal =

American astronomer (1940–2011)

Charles Thomas Kowal
- Born: November 8, 1940; Buffalo, New York, USA
- Died: November 28, 2011 (aged 71); Cinebar, Washington, US
- Education: University of Southern California (BS in astronomy)
- Known for: Discovery of outer Solar System objects
- Scientific career
- Fields: Astronomy
- Workplaces: Caltech's Hale Observatory, STScI, APL

Minor planets discovered: 22
see § List of discovered minor planets

Charles Thomas Kowal (/ˈkoʊ.əl/; November 8, 1940 – November 28, 2011) was an American astronomer known for his observations and discoveries in the Solar System. As a staff astronomer at Caltech's Mount Wilson and Palomar Mountain observatories between 1961 and 1984, he found 2060 Chiron, the second-largest centaur, discovered two moons of the planet Jupiter, and discovered or co-discovered a number of asteroids, comets and supernovae. He was awarded the James Craig Watson Medal for his contributions to astronomy in 1979.

== Research ==
In the 1960s, Kowal observed with the Palomar 48" Schmidt telescope, contributing observations to noted cosmologist Fritz Zwicky's six-volume Catalogue of Galaxies and of Clusters of Galaxies. (Note: Kowal was a coauthor on volumes 1, 5 and 6.) Kowal also began to search for Type Ia supernovae in other galaxies, in an effort led by Zwicky to calibrate the magnitudes of these exploding stars so that they could be used as standard candles, reliable measures of the distance of their host galaxies (work which in the present has led to accurate measurements of the expansion of the universe). In the course of these Palomar supernovae surveys with the 48" Schmidt, Kowal personally discovered 81 supernovae, including SN 1972E.

In 1973, Caltech astronomers Eleanor Helin and Gene Shoemaker began an observing program to search out and track previously unknown near-Earth asteroids, the Planet-Crossing Asteroid Survey (PCAS), a photographic plate survey that began on the Palomar 18" Schmidt telescope. Although primarily employed by the supernova survey to observe on the 48" Schmidt, Kowal provided "crucial observations" of particularly faint asteroids for the PCAS program with the larger telescope. His asteroid discoveries and co-discoveries include the notable asteroids Aten asteroid 2340 Hathor; the Apollo asteroids 1981 Midas, 2063 Bacchus, 2102 Tantalus and (5660) 1974 MA; the Amor asteroids (4596) 1981 QB and (4688) 1980 WF; and the Trojan asteroids 2241 Alcathous and 2594 Acamas. PCAS later moved to the 48" Schmidt, and ran in total for nearly 25 years, until June 1995. (Note: The 48" Schmidt was then fully automated, and used for a successor survey, the Near Earth Asteroid Tracking (NEAT) survey, which ran on the Schmidt from April 2001 to April 2007.)

Kowal provided observations of new Solar System discoveries and reports of new supernovae via the IAU circular system throughout the 1970s, and searched for new objects. He discovered two moons of Jupiter: Leda in 1974 and Themisto in 1975, the 13th and 14th moons of Jupiter to be found. Themisto was later lost (i.e. its orbit was not known well enough to reobserve it) and was not rediscovered until 2000.

Between December 1976 and February 1985, Kowal searched 6400 square degrees of sky in the ecliptic plane for distant, slow-moving Solar System objects. Only one object was found beyond Jupiter: 2060 Chiron, discovered in 1977, which had the unusual characteristic of features both like an asteroid and a comet. It became recognised as the first object in the centaur class after a second one was discovered 15 years later. Centaurs are objects with unstable orbits which orbit between Jupiter and Neptune. They are probably drawn in from the Kuiper belt by alignments with larger planets. Chiron remains one of the largest such worlds known, and one of a handful that have a comet-like coma. Kowal also discovered or co-discovered the periodic comets 99P/Kowal, 104P/Kowal, 134P/Kowal-Vavrova, 143P/Kowal-Mrkos, and 158P/Kowal-LINEAR.

In 1980, Kowal's research in astronomical history found a 1613 drawing by Galileo Galilei showing Neptune near Jupiter, predating the discovery of Neptune in 1846; Kowal was awarded the inaugural R. R. Newton Award for Scientific History for this "shockingly outré" finding.

Kowal moved to the new Space Telescope Science Institute in 1985, where he monitored the instruments of the Hubble Space Telescope as one of the operations astronomers. His book Asteroids: Their Nature and Utilization was published in 1988, and a second edition in 1996.

From 1996 until his retirement in 2006, he worked at the Johns Hopkins University Applied Physics Laboratory, providing software for the NEAR Shoemaker spacecraft's mission to land on the asteroid Eros and mission operations support for the NASA TIMED mission.

Kowal died on November 28, 2011, at the age of 71.

== Honours and awards ==
- Kowal was awarded the National Academy of Sciences' James Craig Watson Medal for his "noteworthy astronomical discoveries, particularly of Chiron, Leda, and numerous supernovae" in 1979.
- The crater Kowal on Pluto was named in his honor.

== List of discovered minor planets ==
List of minor planets discovered by Charles Kowal

Name	Discovery Date	Listing
1876 Napolitania	31 January 1970	list
1939 Loretta	17 October 1974	list
1981 Midas	6 March 1973	list
2060 Chiron	18 October 1977	list
2063 Bacchus	24 April 1977	list
2102 Tantalus	27 December 1975	list
2134 Dennispalm	24 December 1976	list
2241 Alcathous	22 November 1979	list
2340 Hathor	22 October 1976	list
2594 Acamas	4 October 1978	list
2629 Rudra	13 September 1980	list
3163 Randi	28 August 1981	list

Name	Discovery Date	Listing
3924 Birch	11 February 1977	list^{[A]}
4312 Knacke	29 November 1978	list^{[B]}
(4596) 1981 QB	28 August 1981	list
(4688) 1980 WF	29 November 1980	list
(5660) 1974 MA	26 June 1974	list
(24617) 1978 WU	29 November 1978	list^{[B]}
(73669) 1981 WL_{2}	25 November 1981	list
(99953) 1978 ND	7 July 1978	list
(178284) 1978 WB_{1}	29 November 1978	list^{[B]}
(306375) 1980 RG_{1}	13 September 1980	list
Co-discovery made with:^{A} E. Bowell^{B} S. J. Bus

== See also ==
- List of minor planet discoverers § C. T. Kowal
