= 159P/LONEOS =

Jupiter-family comet

Discovery
- Discovered by: LONEOS
- Discovery date: 16 October 2003

Designations
- MPC designation: P/2003 UD_{16}
- Alternative designations: LONEOS 7

Orbital characteristics
- Epoch: 21 November 2025 (JD 2461000.5)
- Observation arc: 31.26 years
- Earliest precovery date: 17 December 1989
- Number of observations: 885
- Aphelion: 8.095 AU
- Perihelion: 3.617 AU
- Semi-major axis: 5.856 AU
- Eccentricity: 0.38236
- Orbital period: 14.171 years
- Inclination: 23.479°
- Longitude of ascending node: 54.937°
- Argument of periapsis: 4.749°
- Mean anomaly: 190.27°
- Last perihelion: 22 May 2018
- Next perihelion: 28 July 2032
- T_{Jupiter}: 2.687
- Earth MOID: 2.633 AU
- Jupiter MOID: 1.345 AU

Physical characteristics
- Mean radius: 2.9 km (1.8 mi)
- Mean density: 660±120 kg/m^{3}
- Comet total magnitude (M1): 12.9

159P/LONEOS is a Jupiter-family comet with a 14.2-year orbit around the Sun. It is one of 18 comets discovered by the Lowell Observatory Near-Earth-Object Search (LONEOS) survey.

Numbered comets
Previous; 158P/Kowal–LINEAR	159P/LONEOS	Next; 160P/LINEAR
