= Kesao Takamizawa =

Japanese astronomer

Kesao Takamizawa (高見沢 今朝雄, Takamizawa Kesao, 1952) is a Japanese astronomer and entomologist. He discovered the periodic comet 98P/Takamizawa. He has discovered many asteroids, including 8720 Takamizawa which is named after him.

== Awards ==
- Seven Discovery Awards, the Astronomical Society of Japan (ASJ)
- Three Distinguished Service Awards, ASJ (1987, 1989, 1997)

== Publications ==
- Takamizawa, Kesao (1997). 天文少年物語: 新天体発見のドラマ [Young Astronomer - Discovering new asteroids] (in Japanese). 信毎書籍出版センター.
- Takamizawa, Kesao (2005). 日本の真社会性ハチ 全種・全亜種生態図鑑 [Ecology of Japanese Social Wasps - Species, Sub species] (in Japanese). Shinano Mainichi Shimbun. ISBN 978-4784070046.
- Kesao Takamizawa, ed. (2010). コイ・フナの絵本 (そだててあそぼう) [Carp and Crucian Carp (picture book)] (in Japanese). Rural Culture Association Japan. ISBN 978-4540101304.
- Kimihiro Kinota; Kesao Takamizawa (2013). 日本産マルハナバチ図鑑 [Handbook of Bombus in Japan] (in Japanese). Hokkaido University Publication. ISBN 9784832913967.
