= C/2001 A2 (LINEAR) =

Non-periodic comet

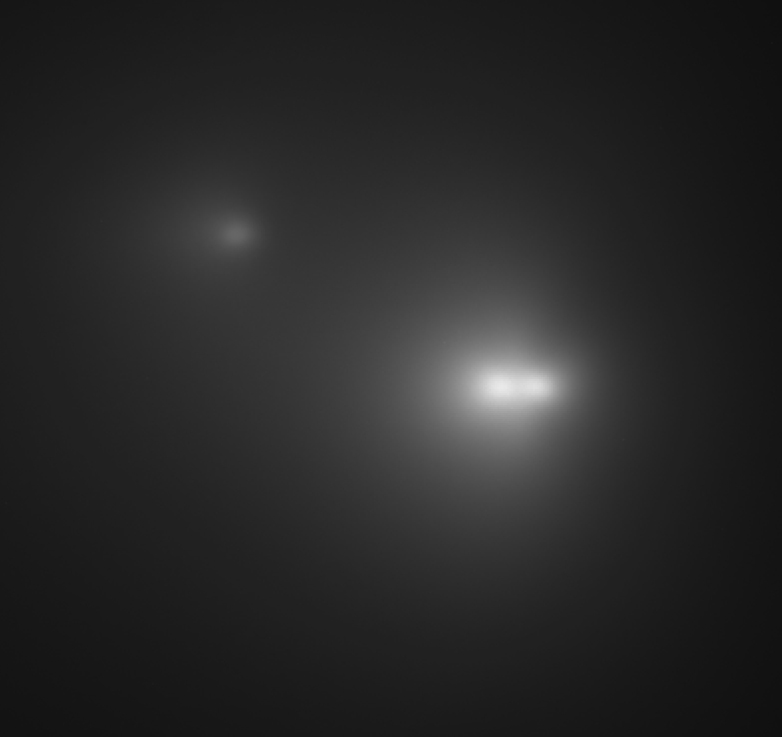
- Fragments of Comet LINEAR photographed from the Paranal–VLT on 16 May 2001

Discovery
- Discovered by: LINEAR
- Discovery date: 15 January 2001

Orbital characteristics
- Epoch: 5 July 2001 (JD 2452095.5)
- Observation arc: 136–333 days
- Earliest precovery date: 3 January 2001
- Number of observations: 436–1,717
- Aphelion: ~5,060 AU; ~2,236 AU (B)
- Perihelion: 0.779 AU
- Semi-major axis: ~2,530 AU (A); ~1,120 AU (B)
- Eccentricity: 0.9997 (A); 0.9993 (B)
- Orbital period: ~127,300 years (A); ~37,400 years (B)
- Inclination: 36.48°
- Longitude of ascending node: 295.12°
- Argument of periapsis: 295.33°
- Last perihelion: 24 May 2001
- T_{Jupiter}: 0.882 (A); 0.885 (B)
- Earth MOID: 0.051 AU

Physical characteristics
- Dimensions: 2.0–3.6 km (1.2–2.2 mi)
- Mean diameter: 2.8 km (1.7 mi)
- Comet total magnitude (M1): 13.0 (A); 7.0 (B)
- Comet nuclear magnitude (M2): 14.0 (B)
- Apparent magnitude: 3.0 (2001 apparition)

C/2001 A2 (LINEAR) is a non-periodic comet from the Oort cloud discovered by LINEAR on 15 January 2001. The nucleus of comet split in multiple fragments during its perihelion passage. The comet brightened to an apparent magnitude of about 3.

== Observational history ==
The comet was discovered on 15 January 2001 by the LINEAR team as an asteroidal object with an apparent magnitude of about 16. Precovery images from 3 and 5 January from Lowell Observatory Near-Earth-Object Search (LONEOS) and LINEAR well also spotted. CCD imaging of the object revealed the presence of a coma, that was estimated to be between 10 and 18 arcseconds across, while its apparent magnitude was estimated to be 17.2. The first orbital ephemeris published indicated that the comet would brightened to a magnitude of about 10 in late June 2001.

The comet brightened slowly at on 14 March 2001 its magnitude was estimated to be 13.1. However in late March 2001 the comet experienced an outburst, brightening from about magnitude 10.8 on 28 March to a magnitude of 8 on 30 March. In mid April the comet was estimated to have a magnitude of about 7.5, while on 18 April, it had brightened to a magnitude of 7, and by the end of the month its magnitude was estimated to be about 6.3.

=== Fragmentation events ===
Carl W. Hergenrother, Matthew A. Chamberlain, and Y. Chamberlain, of the Lunar and Planetary Laboratory reported the discovery of a double nucleus in images obtained on 30 April 2001. The two nuclei were of equal brightness and separated by 3.5 arcseconds. Zdenek Sekanina calculated that the splitting occurred on Mar. 29.9 ± 1.6 UT, when the outburst was observed.

Images obtained by the 8.2-metre VLT MELIPAL telescope at ESO's Paranal Observatory on 14 May 2001 revealed that nucleus B was elongated. The comet was imaged again two days, and it was obvious that nucleus B had split in two pieces separated by about one arcsecond. The total magnitude of the comet was then estimated to be 5.4. An ion tail about 4 degree long was observed with 25×100 binoculars. Fragment A was last detected on 19 May. One more fragment, named fragment G, was found in images obtained on 21 May, having its own tail. It probably was separated by fragment B five weeks prior but flared-up then.

One more outburst was observed in June, with the comet been reported to have an apparent magnitude of 3.3 on 12 June, but by 18 June it had faded to a magnitude of 4.3, while its coma was reported to be 15 arcminutes across and its tail 4.5 degree long. High resolution imaging of the coma on 16–21 June indicated the presence of more fragments, named D, E, and F, near fragment B. Fragment D was separated on June 3.5 ± 1.8, fragment E on June 9.5 ± 0.7, and fragment F on June 11.3 ± 0.5, and resulted in an outburst. The successive fragmentation events in early June could explain the slow rise of the outburst, which lasted 8 days.

The closest approach to Earth took place on 30 June 2001, at a distance of 0.244 AU (36.5 million km; 22.7 million mi). On July 1 the comet had an estimated magnitude of 4.4–4.5 and its coma was estimated to be 16–20 arcminutes across. On 5 July two tails were observed, each two degrees long, and the magnitude was estimated to be about 5. On more outburst took place in mid July, as the comet was reported to have a magnitude of 4.4 on 13 July, but by the end of the month its magnitude was reported to be about 7. No new fragment was detected after that outburst. Smaller outbursts of amplitude 0.4 and 0.2 mag were observed on July 25.0 and 30.0 respectively.

== Scientific results ==
The spectrum of C/2001 A2 was obtained in near infrared by the Near Infrared Echelle Spectrograph (NIRSPEC) at Keck-2 Observatory on 9–10 July 2001, after perihelion. The spectrum of the comet was characterised by enhanced abundances of organic elements such as ethane, acetylene, hydrogen cyanide, and methanol with respect to water, while other molecular species, such as methane, carbon monoxide, and formaldehyde, had more typical abundances. The rotational temperature of the volatiles was measured to be around 100 K, with the exception of HCN, whose rotational temperature was about 60 K. The comet was also observed by the same instrument on 4 and 10 August. The production rate of methane was greatly increased with respect to water between July and August. On the other hand, the abundance of formaldehyde decreased by four times between 9 and 10 July. Both indicate that the nucleus is heterogenous.

The radio spectrum of the comet in the submillimeter and millimeter was obtained using the IRAM-30m and Kitt Peak National Observatory 12-m radio telescope. The upper limit HC3N/HCN ratio was similar to that of comets 153P/Ikeya-Zhang and Hale-Bopp. However, the ratio of acetylene to water and CH3CN was lower. The HNC/HCN production rate ratio increased as the distance of the Sun decreased. The comet was also observed by the Arecibo Observatory, which detected the echo of large dust grains in the coma. The echo was depolarised, the first time it was detected in the radar echo of a comet.

The comet was also observed by the Far Ultraviolet Spectroscopic Explorer on 12 July 2001, during an outburst. In spectrum of the comet were detected for the first time in a comet the C–X and B–X lines of carbon monoxide, OI (^{1}D–^{1}D) at 1152 Å and three hydrogen lines of the Lyman series. The flux of all the lines was decreased by a factor of two within 7.5 hours. The CO emission could be separated into a cold and a hot component, with the cold component being attributed to excitation of CO_{2}.
