= Ukrainian Optical Facilities for Near-Earth Space Surveillance Network =

UMOS
- Ukrainian Optical Facilities for Near-Earth Space Surveillance Network
- Українська мережа оптичних станцій дослідження навколоземного космічного простору
- Founded: December 2011
- Location: Ukraine
- Affiliations: RI "NAO", MAO NASU, RI "OAO", AO LNU, SRL UzhNU, NSFCTC SSAU, CSIRP and NFC SSAU, SIC "Orion" of DSTU
- Website: http://umos.mao.kiev.ua/ukr/

Ukrainian Optical Facilities for Near-Earth Space Surveillance Network, the UMOS (from Ukrainian acronym: УМОС = Українська мережа оптичних станцій дослідження навколоземного космічного простору) is an alliance of Ukrainian institutional research observatories and optical facilities of State Space Agency. Its strategic tasks include near-Earth space research (from LEO to HEO), and the studies of motion of selected objects by development and improvement of theory, models and algorithms. Also it is aimed at addressing tactical problems like assistance in Ukrainian or international space launches. The UMOS's field of view covers large area of space, its facilities arrangement allows to carry out the observations of 3-4 consecutive passes of LEO satellites, as well as synchronous and complementing observations.

The UMOS has conducted the ground-based surveillance of Near-Earth objects since the establishment of the network. The results of data processing earned positive feedbacks from customers in Ukraine: the State Space Agency, the Main Astronomical Observatory as well as our partners abroad. In particular, since 2011 the UMOS (some of the observatories since 2005) has conducted maintenance the first circuits after launching into orbit (Sun-synchronous) with Dnepr to identify and/or refine orbits of space objects (e.g. RapidEye, EgyptSat‑1, CryoSat‑2, Sich‑2, corresponding R/B of launcher).

Also the UMOS carries out optical observations of active satellites and space debris on a single joint list to produce independent TLE catalog and to estimate the probabilities of satellite orbital conjunction for priority satellites, which meets the requirements of national Control Systems and Space Environment Analysis (i.e. similar to Space Situational Awareness). During just 2012 over 130,000 of position estimates for 194 LEO space objects (including series RapidEye, Orbcomm, CubeSat), 37 MEO objects, 29 GEO and GSO objects and also HEO space observatory Radioastron were obtained. As a result, the observation-based database was created, which had comprised 1509 sets of TLE for 183 space objects until the end of 2012.

Recently, due to the increase in number of space debris and solar activity maximum, the operational failures at satellites are much more frequent. Photometric observations can aid in satellite in-orbit status analysis and provide with necessary data for the assessment of feasibility of their recovery.

The photometric observations and data analysis for five tumbling satellites have been made since 2010. Among these five satellites were: two launch failures - Express-AM4 (5,775 kg mass at altitude of 1,000 km), Phobos-Grunt (13,200 kg mass on the low reference orbit of 250 km); as well as three accidents of satellite malfunction, when the appropriate control center has lost the connection - CBERS-2B (1,450 kg at altitude of 780 km), EgyptSat-1 (160 kg at altitude of 670 km), Sich-2 (170 kg at altitude of 670 km). All these satellites, except Phobos-Grunt, are non-resolved objects, thus photometry has been the only source of in-orbit status information. Over 50,000 photometric brightness estimates were obtained for the satellites both in the integral light and broadband BVR Johnson system filters. The UMOS is proven capable to run the whole study, from primary observations to analysis of the light curves and further determination of satellite orientation variations and origin of its possible damage.

== See also ==
- List of near-Earth object observation projects
