= Palomar Planet-Crossing Asteroid Survey =

Minor planets discovered: 20
see § List of discovered minor planets

The Palomar Planet-Crossing Asteroid Survey (PCAS) was an astronomical survey, initiated by American astronomers Eleanor Helin and Eugene Shoemaker at the U.S Palomar Observatory, California, in 1973. The program is responsible for the discovery of 95 near-Earth Objects including 17 comets, while the Minor Planet Center directly credits PCAS with the discovery of 20 numbered minor planets during 1993–1994. PCAS ran for nearly 25 years until June 1995. It had an international extension, INAS, and was the immediate predecessor of the outstandingly successful NEAT program.

== Notable discoveries ==
The first NEO discovered by PACS was (5496) 1973 NA, an Apollo asteroid with an exceptional orbital inclination of 68°, the most highly inclined minor planet known until 1999. In 1976, Eleanor Helin discovered 2062 Aten, the first of a new class of asteroids called the Aten asteroids with small orbits that are never far from Earth's orbit. As a result, these objects have a particularly high probability of colliding with the Earth. In 1979, Helin discovered an Apollo-type asteroid, that they later identified with the comet 4015 Wilson–Harrington. It was the first confirmation that a comet can evolve into an asteroid after it has degassed.

== List of discovered minor planets ==
(7029) 1993 XT2	14 December 1993	list
(9072) 1993 RX3	12 September 1993	list
(9078) 1994 PB2	9 August 1994	list
(10363) 1994 UP_{11}	31 October 1994	list
(10564) 1993 XQ_{2}	14 December 1993	list
(13594) 1994 PC_{2}	9 August 1994	list
(14476) 1993 XW_{2}	14 December 1993	list
(14912) 1993 RP_{3}	12 September 1993	list
(15344) 1994 PA_{2}	9 August 1994	list
(18435) 1994 GW_{10}	14 April 1994	list

(18436) 1994 GY_{10}	14 April 1994	list
(24781) 1993 RU_{3}	12 September 1993	list
(24797) 1994 PD_{2}	9 August 1994	list
(24798) 1994 PF_{2}	9 August 1994	list
(26868) 1993 RS_{3}	12 September 1993	list
(37671) 1994 UY_{11}	31 October 1994	list
(39620) 1994 PE_{2}	9 August 1994	list
(46623) 1994 GV_{10}	14 April 1994	list
(52418) 1994 GX_{10}	14 April 1994	list
(120503) 1993 RW_{3}	12 September 1993	list

== See also ==
- Brian P. Roman
- List of minor planet discoverers § Discovering dedicated institutions
- Spacewatch
- List of near-Earth object observation projects

== Publications ==
- Helin, E.F.; Shoemaker, E.M. (December 1979). "The Palomar planet-crossing asteroid survey, 1973–1978". Icarus. 40 (3): 321–328. Bibcode:1979Icar...40..321H. doi:10.1016/0019-1035(79)90021-6.
- Helin, E. F. (1991). "Palomar Planet-Crossing Asteroid Survey (PCAS): Recent discovery rate". Asteroids, Comets, Meteors: 235–236. Bibcode:1992acm..proc..235H.
