= 2063 Bacchus =

Near-Earth object of the Apollo group

Discovery
- Discovered by: C. Kowal
- Discovery site: Palomar Obs.
- Discovery date: 24 April 1977

Designations
- Pronunciation: /ˈbækəs/ BAK-əs
- Named after: Bacchus (Dionysus in Greek) (Roman god)
- Alternative designations: 1977 HB
- Minor planet category: NEO · Apollo; Venus-crosser
- Adjectives: Bacchian /ˈbækiən/
- Symbol: (astrological)

Orbital characteristics
- Epoch 4 September 2017 (JD 2458000.5)
- Uncertainty parameter 0
- Observation arc: 39.10 yr (14,282 days)
- Aphelion: 1.4545 AU
- Perihelion: 0.7013 AU
- Semi-major axis: 1.0779 AU
- Eccentricity: 0.3494
- Orbital period (sidereal): 0.9897 yr (361.487925 days)
- Mean anomaly: 113.13°
- Mean motion: 0° 52^{m} 50.52^{s} / day
- Inclination: 1.5205167°
- Longitude of ascending node: 33.103°
- Argument of perihelion: 55.315°
- Earth MOID: 0.0677 AU · 26.4 LD

Physical characteristics
- Dimensions: 1.11 km × 0.53 km × 0.50 km 2.6 km × 1.1 km × 1.1 km
- Mean diameter: 0.63 km (D_{eff}); 1.03±0.03 km 1.05 km (derived)
- Synodic rotation period: 14.544±0.007 h 14.904 h 15.0±0.2 h
- Geometric albedo: 0.19±0.03; 0.20 (assumed); 0.33^{+0.25}_{−0.11} (radar); 0.56^{+0.12}_{−0.18} (visual)
- Spectral type: SMASS = Sq · S
- Absolute magnitude (H): 17.3

2063 Bacchus, provisional designation 1977 HB, is a stony asteroid and near-Earth object of the Apollo group, approximately 1 kilometer in diameter. The contact binary was discovered on 24 April 1977, by American astronomer Charles Kowal at the Palomar Observatory in California, United States. It was named after Bacchus from Roman mythology.

== Orbit and classification ==
Bacchus orbits the Sun at a distance of 0.7–1.5 AU once every 1 years and 1 month (409 days). Its orbit has an eccentricity of 0.35 and an inclination of 9° with respect to the ecliptic. The asteroid's observation arc begins with its official discovery observation at Palomar. Due to its eccentric orbit, it is also a Venus-crosser.

=== Approaches ===
Bacchus has an Earth minimum orbital intersection distance of 0.0677 AU (10,130,000 km), which corresponds to 26.4 lunar distances. On 31 March 1996, it passed 0.0677525 AU (10,135,600 km) from Earth.

== Physical characteristics ==
In the SMASS classification, Bacchus is a Sq-type, that transitions from the common S-type asteroids to the Q-type asteroids. It is a contact binary with bilobate shape.

In March 1996 radar observations were conducted at the Goldstone Observatory under the direction of JPL scientists Steven Ostro and Lance Benner, allowing the construction of a model of the object. Optical observations were conducted by Petr Pravec, Marek Wolf, and Lenka Šarounová during March and April 1996. It was also photometrically observed by American astronomer Brian Warner in 2015.

According to the survey carried out by the NEOWISE mission of NASA's Wide-field Infrared Survey Explorer, Bacchus measures 1.03 kilometers in diameter and its surface has an albedo of 0.19. The Collaborative Asteroid Lightcurve Link assumes a standard albedo for stony asteroids of 0.20 and derives a diameter of 1.05 kilometers based on an absolute magnitude of 17.25.

== Naming ==
This minor planet was named for the Roman god Bacchus (Dionysus).The official naming citation was published by the Minor Planet Center on 1 August 1978 (M.P.C. 4421).
