= C/2001 Q4 (NEAT) =

Hyperbolic comet

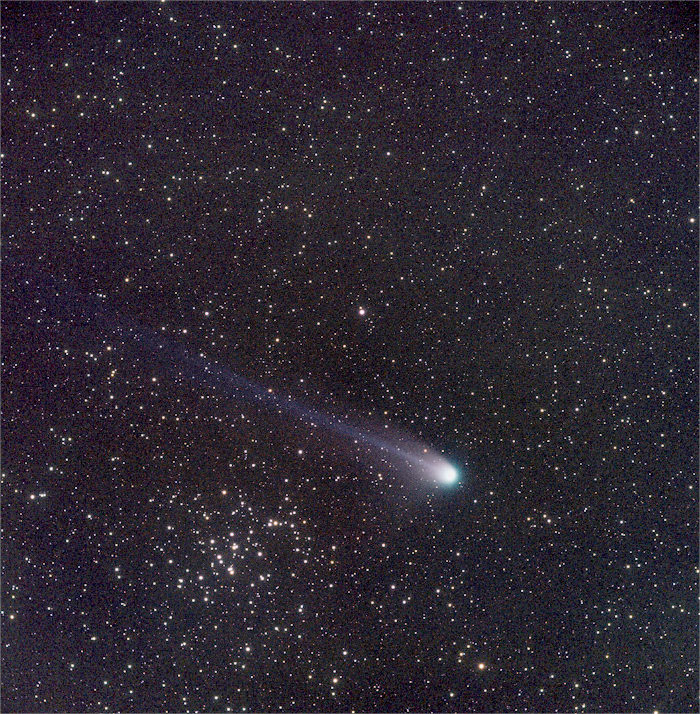
- Comet NEAT and Messier 44 photographed by Oliver Stein on 16 May 2004

Discovery
- Discovered by: NEAT
- Discovery date: 24 August 2001

Orbital characteristics
- Epoch: 15 May 2004 (JD 2453140.5)
- Observation arc: 1,811 days (4.96 years)
- Number of observations: 2,617
- Perihelion: 0.962 AU
- Eccentricity: 1.00069 (inbound); 1.00067 (outbound)
- Inclination: 99.643°
- Longitude of ascending node: 210.28°
- Argument of periapsis: 1.204°
- Mean anomaly: –0.000018°
- Last perihelion: 15 May 2004
- Earth MOID: 0.043 AU
- Jupiter MOID: 4.279 AU

Physical characteristics
- Dimensions: 3.6–7.2 km (2.2–4.5 mi)
- Mean diameter: 5.4 km (3.4 mi)
- Mass: 1.1×10^{13} kg
- Comet total magnitude (M1): 8.0

C/2001 Q4 (NEAT) is a comet with an almost perpendicular retrograde orbit which brings it into the inner Solar System by a deeply southward path. It initially emerged from its remote home spending most of its time near the south celestial pole. This comet was discovered on August 24, 2001 by the Near-Earth Asteroid Tracking program (NEAT).

In 2004, residents of the southern hemisphere had the opportunity to watch the comet gradually brighten as it raced toward perihelion. On May 6, 2004 the comet approached within 0.32 AU of the Earth. Beginning in early May, the comet started racing north and burst into view in the northern hemisphere when it had reached almost maximum brightness.

With a near perihelion orbital eccentricity of 1.00069 (epoch 2004-May-18) that keeps a barycentric epoch 2014-Jan-01 eccentricity of 1.00067, this hyperbolic comet is going to be ejected from the Solar System.

== Gallery ==
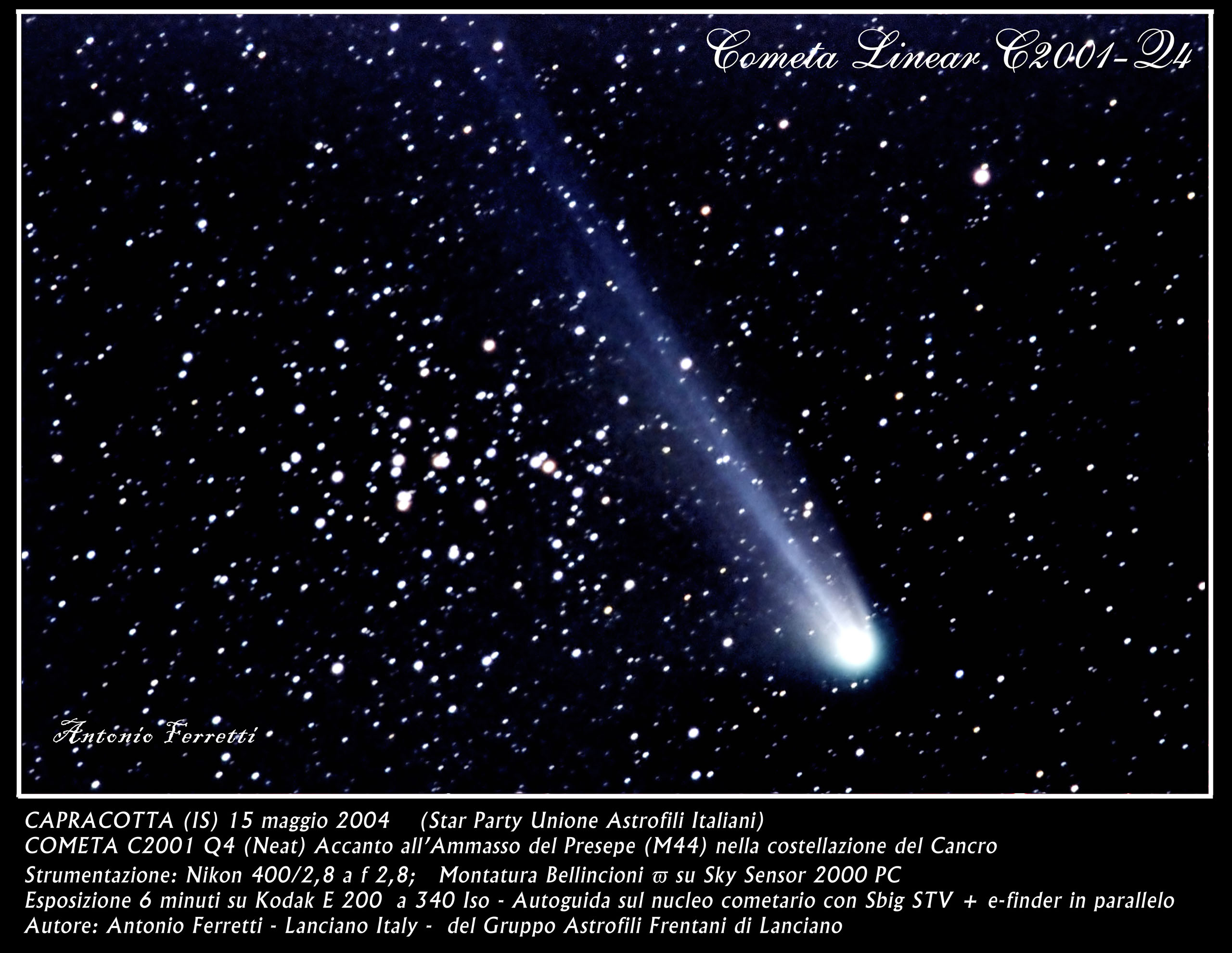
C/2001 Q4 (NEAT) next to Messier 44 on 15 May 2004

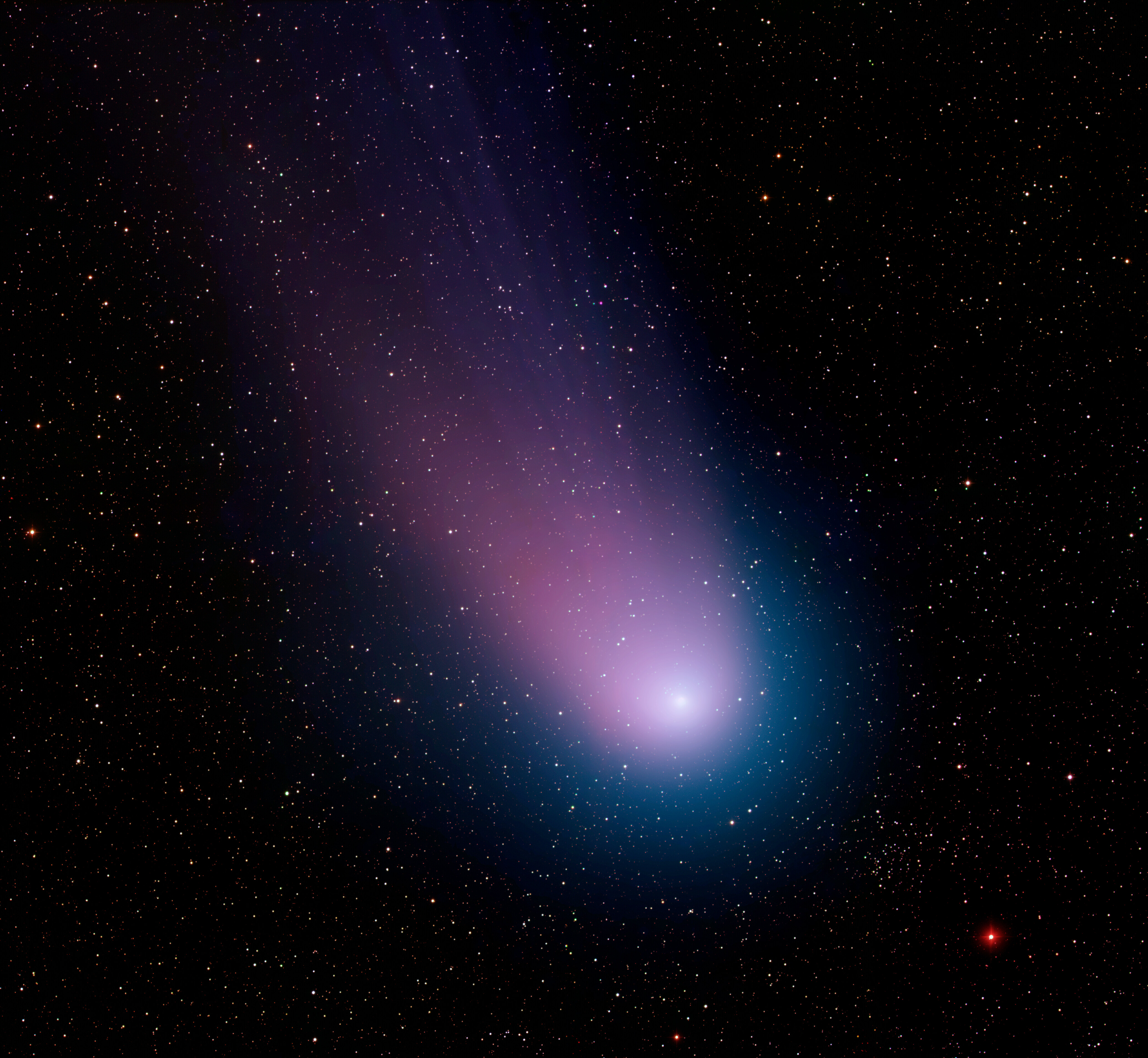
The comet on 7 May 2004 by Kitt Peak National Observatory
