= 158P/Kowal–LINEAR =

Jupiter-family comet

Discovery
- Discovered by: Charles T. Kowal; LINEAR
- Discovery site: Palomar Observatory
- Discovery date: 24 July 1979; 12 September 2001

Designations
- MPC designation: P/1979 O1; P/2001 RG_{100}
- Alternative designations: 1979h

Orbital characteristics
- Epoch: 12 July 2012 (JD 2456120.5)
- Observation arc: 45.51 years
- Number of observations: 1,093
- Aphelion: 4.865 AU
- Perihelion: 4.576 AU
- Semi-major axis: 4.721 AU
- Eccentricity: 0.03061
- Orbital period: 10.258 years
- Inclination: 7.908°
- Longitude of ascending node: 137.31°
- Argument of periapsis: 232.61°
- Mean anomaly: 352.78°
- Last perihelion: 12 May 2021
- Next perihelion: 8 November 2036
- T_{Jupiter}: 2.988
- Earth MOID: 3.579 AU
- Jupiter MOID: 0.416 AU

Physical characteristics
- Mean radius: 5.42 km (3.37 mi)
- Comet total magnitude (M1): 7.1
- Comet nuclear magnitude (M2): 12.7

158P/Kowal–LINEAR is a Jupiter-family comet with a 10.3-year orbit around the Sun. It is one of six comets discovered by American astronomer, Charles T. Kowal, and also one of several by the LINEAR program.

== Observational history ==
=== 1979 discovery and loss ===
In August 1979, Charles T. Kowal reported to the IAU that he had discovered a comet from photographic plates taken from the Palomar Observatory on 24 July 1979. He described it as a diffuse 19th-magnitude object with no condensation nor tail within the constellation Sagitta. (Note: Reported initial position upon discovery was: α = 19^{h} 25.5^{m} , δ = 17° 48′) Orbital calculations by Eleanor F. Helin indicated that Kowal's comet is periodic. Brian G. Marsden confirmed Helin's computations, however he also noted that it was not observed since 27 July, essentially classifying Kowal's comet as lost.

=== 2003 rediscovery ===
In November 2003, A. E. Gleason reported cometary activity on an asteroid-like object found by the Lincoln Near-Earth Asteroid Research (LINEAR) program called P/2001 RG_{100}, first detected in 12 September 2001. Further orbital calculations by Marsden and later Shuichi Nakano found that its orbit is identical to Kowal's previously lost comet in 1979. After both comets were confirmed to be the same object, the IAU Committee on Small-Body Nomenclature agreed to rename the comet as 158P/Kowal–LINEAR on 8 December 2003.

== Physical characteristics ==
Observations from the Sloan Digital Sky Survey (SDSS) in 2012 indicated that the nucleus of 158P/Kowal–LINEAR is approximately 5.42 km (3.37 mi) in radius.

== Orbit ==
The Minor Planet Center had the comet coming to perihelion on 9 May 2021, and JPL had the comet coming to perihelion on 12 May 2021. A close approach to Jupiter on 24 July 2022 will notably lift the orbit and increase the orbital period. The next perihelion passage will be in 2036 at a distance of 5.2 AU (780 million km) from the Sun.

== Notes ==
Numbered comets
Previous; 157P/Tritton	158P/Kowal–LINEAR	Next; 159P/LONEOS
