= Near-Earth Asteroid Tracking =

Program to discover near-Earth objects

- Abbreviation: NEAT
- Predecessor: Palomar Planet-Crossing Asteroid Survey
- Successor: Near Earth Object Program
- Formation: December 1995
- Founded at: Haleakalā Observatory, Maui, Hawaii
- Dissolved: April 2007
- Type: Space observation program
- Legal status: Disbanded
- Purpose: To search for and map out near-earth asteroids
- Principal investigator: Raymond Bambery
- Co-investigator and project manager: Steven H. Pravdo
- Co-investigators: David L. Rabinowitz, Ken Lawrence and Michael Hicks
- Main organ: National Aeronautics and Space Administration
- Parent organization: Jet Propulsion Laboratory
- Website: neat.jpl.nasa.gov

Near-Earth Asteroid Tracking (NEAT) was a program run by NASA and the Jet Propulsion Laboratory, surveying the sky for near-Earth objects. NEAT was conducted from December 1995 until April 2007, at GEODSS on Hawaii (Haleakala-NEAT; 566), as well as at Palomar Observatory in California (Palomar-NEAT; 644). With the discovery of more than 40,000 minor planets, NEAT has been one of the most successful programs in this field, comparable to the Catalina Sky Survey, LONEOS and Mount Lemmon Survey.

NEAT was the successor to the Palomar Planet-Crossing Asteroid Survey (PCAS).

== History ==
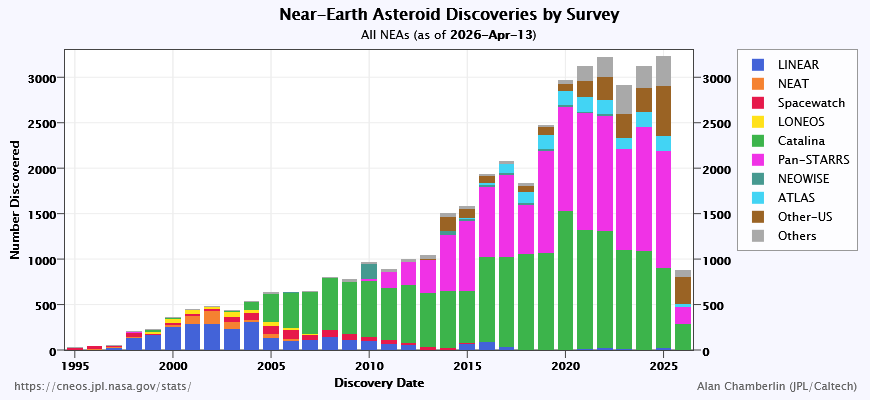
Number of NEOs detected by various projects: LINEAR; NEAT; Spacewatch; LONEOS / CSS; Pan-STARRS; NEOWISE; All others

The original principal investigator was Eleanor F. Helin, with co-investigators Steven H. Pravdo and David L. Rabinowitz.

NEAT had a cooperative agreement with the U.S. Air Force to use a GEODSS telescope located on Haleakala, Maui, Hawaii. GEODSS stands for Ground-based Electro-Optical Deep Space Surveillance and these wide-field Air Force telescopes were designed to optically observe Earth orbital spacecraft. The NEAT team designed a CCD camera and computer system for the GEODSS telescope. The CCD camera format was 4,096 × 4,096 pixels and the field of view was 1.2° × 1.6°.

Beginning in April 2001, the Samuel Oschin telescope (1.2-metre-aperture [3.9 ft] Schmidt telescope at Palomar Observatory) was also put into service to discover and track near-Earth objects. This telescope was equipped with a camera containing 112 CCDs each 2,400 × 600. This was the telescope that produced the images leading to the discovery of 50000 Quaoar in 2002, and 90377 Sedna in 2003 (published 2004) and the dwarf planet Eris.

In addition to discovering thousands of asteroids, NEAT was also credited with the co-discovery (recovery) of periodic comet 54P/de Vico–Swift–NEAT and of the high proper-motion Teegarden's Star. The C/2001 Q4 (NEAT) comet was discovered on August 24, 2001 by NEAT.

An asteroid was named in its honour, 64070 NEAT, in early 2005.

== Discoveries ==
Minor planets discovered: 40,975
see List of minor planets § Main index

1996 PW was discovered on 9 August 1996 by a NEAT automated search camera on Haleakalā, Hawaii. It was the first object that was not an active comet discovered on an orbit typical of a long-period comets. This raised the possibility it was an extinct comet or an unusual asteroid.

== See also ==
- Minor Planet Center (MPC)
- Planetary Data System (PDS)
- Spaceguard
- List of near-Earth object observation projects
