= Lincoln Near-Earth Asteroid Research =

American astronomical survey for identifying and tracking near-Earth objects

- Alternative names: LINEAR
- Coordinates: 33°49′05″N 106°39′33″W
- Observatory code: 704
- Website: www.ll.mit.edu/impact/watch-potentially-hazardous-asteroids

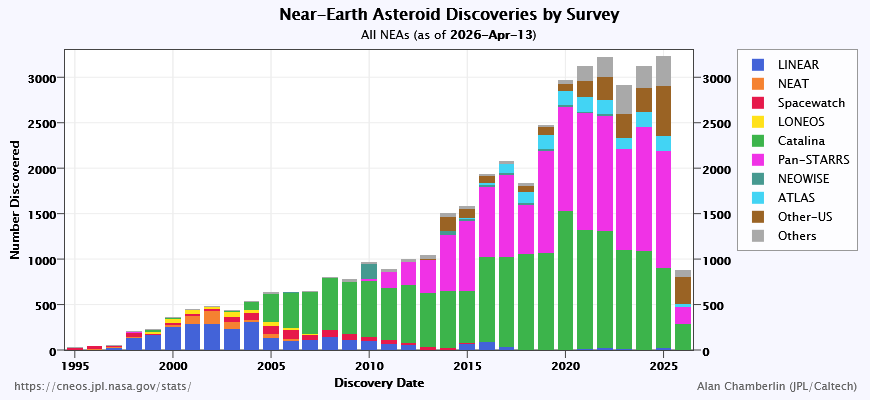
Number of NEOs detected by various projects: LINEAR; NEAT; Spacewatch; LONEOS / CSS; Pan-STARRS; NEOWISE; All others

The Lincoln Near-Earth Asteroid Research (LINEAR) project is a collaboration of the United States Air Force, NASA, and the Massachusetts Institute of Technology's Lincoln Laboratory for the systematic detection and tracking of near-Earth objects. LINEAR was responsible for the majority of asteroid discoveries from 1998 until it was overtaken by the Catalina Sky Survey in 2005. As of 15 September 2011, LINEAR had detected 231,082 new small Solar System bodies, of which at least 2,423 were near-Earth asteroids and 279 were comets. The instruments used by the LINEAR program are located at Lincoln Laboratory's Experimental Test Site (ETS) on the White Sands Missile Range (WSMR) near Socorro, New Mexico.

== History ==
In the late 1970s, the Lincoln Laboratory's Experimental Test Site facility (observatory code 704) was built at White Sands Missile Range. The project's prototype used low-light video cameras. In 1994 a new proposal was made for automated detection of asteroids, this time using newer digital detector technology. The LINEAR project began operating a near-Earth object discovery facility in 1996 using a 1.0 m (39 in) aperture telescope designed for the Air Force Space Command's Ground-based Electro-Optical Deep Space Surveillance (GEODSS). The wide-field Air Force telescopes were designed for optical observation of Earth-orbiting spacecraft. Initial field tests used a 1024 × 1024 pixel charge-coupled device (CCD) detector. While this CCD detector filled only about one fifth of the telescope's field of view, four near-earth objects were discovered. A 1960 × 2560 pixel CCD which covered the telescope's two-square degree field of view was then installed, and both detectors were used in later tests.

The first LINEAR telescope became fully operational in March 1998. Beginning in October 1999, a second 1.0 m telescope was added to the search effort. In 2002, a 0.5 m (20 in) telescope equipped with the original CCD was brought on-line to provide follow-up observations for the discoveries made by the two search telescopes. This allowed about 20% more of the sky to be searched each night. Data recorded by the telescopes is sent to a Lincoln Laboratory facility at Hanscom Air Force Base in Lexington, Massachusetts for processing. Detections are then forwarded to the Minor Planet Center.

== Discoveries ==
Minor planets discovered: 147,707
see List of minor planets § Main index

In addition to discovering more than 140,000 minor planets, LINEAR is also credited with the discovery, or co-discovery, or rediscovery of several periodic comets, including 11P/Tempel–Swift–LINEAR, 158P/Kowal-LINEAR, 160P/LINEAR (LINEAR 43), 165P/LINEAR (LINEAR 10), and 176P/LINEAR (LINEAR 52, 118401 LINEAR: one of only five objects classified both as comets and asteroids). Other objects discovered include (137108) 1999 AN10, (179806) 2002 TD66, and 2004 FH. One of LINEAR's discoveries (231937) 2001 FO32 passed near the Earth on 21 March, 2021

== See also ==
- EURONEAR
- List of comets discovered by the LINEAR project
- List of minor planet discoverers § Discovering dedicated institutions
- Minor Planet Center
- Planetary Data System
