= Meanings of minor-planet names: 2001–3000 =

As minor planet discoveries are confirmed, they are given a permanent number by the IAU's Minor Planet Center (MPC), and the discoverers can then submit names for them, following the IAU's naming conventions. The list below concerns those minor planets in the specified number-range that have received names, and explains the meanings of those names.

Official naming citations of newly named small Solar System bodies are approved and published in a bulletin by IAU's Working Group for Small Bodies Nomenclature (WGSBN). Before May 2021, citations were published in MPC's Minor Planet Circulars for many decades. Recent citations can also be found on the JPL Small-Body Database (SBDB). Until his death in 2016, German astronomer Lutz D. Schmadel compiled these citations into the Dictionary of Minor Planet Names (DMP) and regularly updated the collection.

Based on Paul Herget's The Names of the Minor Planets, Schmadel also researched the unclear origin of numerous asteroids, most of which had been named prior to World War II. This article incorporates text from this source, which is in the public domain: SBDB New namings may only be added to this list below after official publication as the preannouncement of names is condemned. The WGSBN publishes a comprehensive guideline for the naming rules of non-cometary small Solar System bodies.

== 2001–2100 ==
Named minor planet	Provisional	This minor planet was named for...	Ref; Catalog
2001 Einstein	1973 EB	Albert Einstein (1879–1955), German-born, Swiss–American physicist and Nobelist	DMP · 2001
2002 Euler	1973 QQ_{1}	Leonhard Euler (1707–1783), Swiss mathematician and physicists	DMP · 2002
2003 Harding	6559 P-L	Karl Ludwig Harding (1765–1834), German astronomer	DMP · 2003
2004 Lexell	1973 SV_{2}	Anders Johan Lexell (1740–1784), Finnish-Swedish-Russian astronomer and mathematician	DMP · 2004
2005 Hencke	1973 RA	Karl Ludwig Hencke (1793–1866), German astronomer	DMP · 2005
2006 Polonskaya	1973 SB_{3}	Elena Kazimirtchak-Polonskaïa (1902–1992), Ukrainian astronomer (comets)	MPC · 2006
2007 McCuskey	1963 SQ	Sidney W. McCuskey (1907–1979), American observatory director	MPC · 2007
2008 Konstitutsiya	1973 SV_{4}	1977 Constitution of the Soviet Union	MPC · 2008
2009 Voloshina	1968 UL	Vera Voloshina (1919–1941), Russian partisan	MPC · 2009
2010 Chebyshev	1969 TL_{4}	Pafnuty Chebyshev (1821–1884), Russian mathematician	MPC · 2010
2011 Veteraniya	1970 QB_{1}	Russian for "Veterans" (of World War II)	MPC · 2011
2012 Guo Shou-Jing	1964 TE_{2}	Guo Shoujing (1231–1316), Chinese astronomer and mathematician	MPC · 2012
2013 Tucapel	1971 UH_{4}	Mapuche (Araucanian) chief	MPC · 2013
2014 Vasilevskis	1973 JA	Stanislaus Vasilevskis (died 1988), Latvian-born American astronomer	DMP · 2014
2015 Kachuevskaya	1972 RA_{3}	Natasha Kachuevskaya, Russian soldier during WWII who was killed in the battle of Stalingrad	MPC · 2015
2016 Heinemann	1938 SE	Karl Heinemann (1898–1970), German astronomer at ARI	DMP · 2016
2017 Wesson	A903 SC	Mary Joan Wesson Bardwell (1924–2021), wife of American astronomer Conrad M. Bardwell (1926–2010), who was a research associate at the Minor Planet Center	DMP · 2017
2018 Schuster	1931 UC	Hans-Emil Schuster (born 1934), German astronomer and discoverer of minor planets	DMP · 2018
2019 van Albada	1935 SX_{1}	Gale Bruno van Albada (1911–1972), Dutch astronomer	MPC · 2019
2020 Ukko	1936 FR	Ukko, Finnish supreme god	MPC · 2020
2021 Poincaré	1936 MA	Henri Poincaré (1854–1912), French mathematician	MPC · 2021
2022 West	1938 CK	Richard Martin West (born 1941), Danish astronomer and discoverer of minor planets	DMP · 2022
2023 Asaph	1952 SA	Asaph Hall (1829–1907), American astronomer	DMP · 2023
2024 McLaughlin	1952 UR	Dean Benjamin McLaughlin (1901–1965), American spectroscopist and geologist	MPC · 2024
2025 Nortia	1953 LG	Nortia, Etruscan goddess of fortune	MPC · 2025
2026 Cottrell	1955 FF	Frederick Gardner Cottrell (1877–1948), American businessman chemist, inventor and philanthropist	MPC · 2026
2027 Shen Guo	1964 VR_{1}	Shen Kuo (1031–1095), astronomer	MPC · 2027
2028 Janequeo	1968 OB_{1}	Wife of Mapuche (Araucanian) chief Guepotan	MPC · 2028
2029 Binomi	1969 RB	Fictional mathematician, jokingly referred to as the inventor of mathematical formula, such as the Binomial theorem	MPC · 2029
2030 Belyaev	1969 TA_{2}	Pavel Belyayev (1925–1970), Soviet cosmonaut, officer and fighter pilot	MPC · 2030
2031 BAM	1969 TG_{2}	builders of Baikal Amur Mainline (BAM)	MPC · 2031
2032 Ethel	1970 OH	Ethel Lilian Voynich (1864–1960), British author	MPC · 2032
2033 Basilea	1973 CA	The city of Basel in Switzerland	MPC · 2033
2034 Bernoulli	1973 EE	Several mathematicians of the Bernoulli family, in particular Jacob (1654–1705), Johann (1667–1748) and Daniel (1700–1782)	MPC · 2034
2035 Stearns	1973 SC	Carl Leo Stearns (1892–1972), American astronomer	MPC · 2035
2036 Sheragul	1973 SY_{2}	Sheragul, Siberian village in Russia	MPC · 2036
2037 Tripaxeptalis	1973 UB	3 times 679 Pax and 7 times 291 Alice	MPC · 2037
2038 Bistro	1973 WF	Bistro, a type of restaurant	MPC · 2038
2039 Payne-Gaposchkin	1974 CA	Cecilia Payne-Gaposchkin (1900–1979), British-born American astronomer	DMP · 2039
2040 Chalonge	1974 HA	Daniel Chalonge (1895–1977), French astronomer	MPC · 2040
2041 Lancelot	2523 P-L	Lancelot, Arthurian knight	MPC · 2041
2042 Sitarski	4633 P-L	Grzegorz Sitarski, Polish astronomer at the Polish Academy of Sciences, who studied the motion of comets	MPC · 2042
2043 Ortutay	1936 TH	Gyula Ortutay (1910–1978), Hungarian cultural leader	MPC · 2043
2044 Wirt	1950 VE	Carl A. Wirtanen (1910–1990), American astronomer and discoverer of minor planets and comets	MPC · 2044
2045 Peking	1964 TB_{1}	Beijing, capital of the People's Republic of China	MPC · 2045
2046 Leningrad	1968 UD_{1}	Leningrad, city in the USSR	MPC · 2046
2047 Smetana	1971 UA_{1}	Bedřich Smetana (1824–1884), Czech composer	MPC · 2047
2048 Dwornik	1973 QA	Stephen E. Dwornik, American planetary geologist	DMP · 2048
2049 Grietje	1973 SH	G. A. M. Haring-Gehrels, sister-in-law of Dutch-born American astronomer Tom Gehrels †	MPC · 2049
2050 Francis	1974 KA	Fred and Kay Francis, parents of discoverer	DMP · 2050
2051 Chang	1976 UC	Zhang Yuzhe (Y.C. Chang), Chinese astronomer, director of the Purple Mountain Observatory	MPC · 2051
2052 Tamriko	1976 UN	Tamara West, wife of discoverer Richard Martin West	MPC · 2052
2053 Nuki	1976 UO	Nodari West, son of discoverer Richard Martin West	MPC · 2053
2054 Gawain	4097 P-L	Gawain, Arthurian knight	MPC · 2054
2055 Dvořák	1974 DB	Antonín Dvořák (1841–1904), Czech composer	MPC · 2055
2056 Nancy	A909 TB	Nancy Lou Zissell Marsden, wife of Brian G. Marsden	DMP · 2056
2057 Rosemary	1934 RQ	Rosemary Birky Hoffmann Scholl, first wife of Hans Scholl	DMP · 2057
2058 Róka	1938 BH	Gedeon Róka (1906–1974), Hungarian science writer † ‡	MPC · 2058
2059 Baboquivari	1963 UA	Babioquivari, mountain sacred to the Tohono O'odham of northern Mexico and southern Arizona	MPC · 2059
2060 Chiron	1977 UB	Chiron, a centaur from Greek mythology	DMP · 2060
2061 Anza	1960 UA	Juan Bautista de Anza (1736–1788), Spanish explorer, military officer, and Governor of the Province of New Mexico under the Spanish Empire	MPC · 2061
2062 Aten	1976 AA	Aten, Egyptian god	MPC · 2062
2063 Bacchus	1977 HB	Bacchus (Dionysus), Roman god	MPC · 2063
2064 Thomsen	1942 RQ	Ivan Leslie Thomsen (1910–1969), New Zealand astronomer	MPC · 2064
2065 Spicer	1959 RN	Edward H. Spicer (1906–1983), anthropologist	MPC · 2065
2066 Palala	1934 LB	Palala River, tributary of the Limpopo River, South Africa	MPC · 2066
2067 Aksnes	1936 DD	Kaare Aksnes, astronomer	MPC · 2067
2068 Dangreen	1948 AD	Daniel W. E. Green, American observatory worker, involved in the MPC's transition from Cincinnati to Cambridge in 1978	MPC · 2068
2069 Hubble	1955 FT	Edwin Hubble (1889–1953), American astronomer	MPC · 2069
2070 Humason	1964 TQ	Milton L. Humason (1891–1972), American astronomer	MPC · 2070
2071 Nadezhda	1971 QS	Nadezhda Konstantinovna Krupskaya (1869–1939), educator, wife of Vladimir Lenin	MPC · 2071
2072 Kosmodemyanskaya	1973 QE_{2}	Lubov' Timofeevna Kosmodemyanskaya (1900–1978), mother of Soviet heroes Zoya Kosmodemyanskaya and Aleksandr Kosmodemyansky	MPC · 2072
2073 Janáček	1974 DK	Leoš Janáček (1854–1928), Czech composer	MPC · 2073
2074 Shoemaker	1974 UA	Eugene Shoemaker (1928–1997), American astronomer	MPC · 2074
2075 Martinez	1974 VA	Hugo Arturo Martinez (1890–1976), Argentinian astronomer at La Plata Observatory	MPC · 2075
2076 Levin	1974 WA	Boris Yulevich Levin (1912–1989), Russian astronomer and geophysicist	MPC · 2076
2077 Kiangsu	1974 YA	Jiangsu, province in eastern China	MPC · 2077
2078 Nanking	1975 AD	Nanjing, Chinese city near the Purple Mountain Observatory	MPC · 2078
2079 Jacchia	1976 DB	Luigi Giuseppe Jacchia, Italian-born American astronomer	MPC · 2079
2080 Jihlava	1976 DG	Jihlava, city in the Czech Republic	MPC · 2080
2081 Sázava	1976 DH	Sázava River, tributary of Vltava River, Czech Republic	MPC · 2081
2082 Galahad	7588 P-L	Galahad, Arthurian knight	MPC · 2082
2083 Smither	1973 WB	John C. Smith, American astronomer involved with the Palomar Planet-Crossing Asteroid Survey	MPC · 2083
2084 Okayama	1935 CK	Okayama, Okayama, Japan	MPC · 2084
2085 Henan	1965 YA	Henan, province in China	MPC · 2085
2086 Newell	1966 BC	Homer E. Newell Jr. (1915–1983), American physicist and space scientist	MPC · 2086
2087 Kochera	1975 YC	Theodor Kocher (1841–1917), Swiss surgeon and Nobel laureate	MPC · 2087
2088 Sahlia	1976 DJ	Hermann Sahli (1856–1933), Swiss physician and professor of internal medicine at Berne University	MPC · 2088
2089 Cetacea	1977 VF	Cetacea, clade of aquatic mammals such as whales and dolphins	MPC · 2089
2090 Mizuho	1978 EA	Daughter of Japanese discoverer Takeshi Urata	MPC · 2090
2091 Sampo	1941 HO	Sampo, magical artifact from Finnish mythology	MPC · 2091
2092 Sumiana	1969 UP	Sumy, Ukraine	MPC · 2092
2093 Genichesk	1971 HX	Henichesk, city in north-eastern Ukraine, birthplace of discoverer Tamara Smirnova	MPC · 2093
2094 Magnitka	1971 TC_{2}	Magnitogorsk, Russian industrial city	MPC · 2094
2095 Parsifal	6036 P-L	Parsifal, Arthurian knight	MPC · 2095
2096 Väinö	1939 UC	Väinämöinen, from Finnish mythology	MPC · 2096
2097 Galle	1953 PV	Johann Gottfried Galle (1812–1910), German astronomer	MPC · 2097
2098 Zyskin	1972 QE	Lev Zyskin (1930–1994), Professor at the Crimean medical institute	MPC · 2098
2099 Öpik	1977 VB	Ernst Öpik (1893–1985), Estonian astronomer	MPC · 2099
2100 Ra-Shalom	1978 RA	Egyptian god Ra + Hebrew Shalom, in honour of the Camp David Peace Accords of 1978	MPC · 2100

== 2101–2200 ==
back to top

Named minor planet	Provisional	This minor planet was named for...	Ref; Catalog
2101 Adonis	1936 CA	Adonis, Greek mythological youth	MPC · 2101
2102 Tantalus	1975 YA	Tantalus, Greek mythological figure	MPC · 2102
2103 Laverna	1960 FL	Laverna, protecting divinity of thieves and imposters	MPC · 2103
2104 Toronto	1963 PD	University of Toronto, during whose sesquicentennial celebration it was discovered	MPC · 2104
2105 Gudy	1976 DA	Gudrun Werner, friend of astronomer Hans-Emil Schuster who discovered this minor planet	MPC · 2105
2106 Hugo	1936 UF	Victor Hugo (1802–1885), French writer	DMP · 2106
2107 Ilmari	1941 VA	Ilmarinen, Finnish mythology	MPC · 2107
2108 Otto Schmidt	1948 TR_{1}	Otto Schmidt (1891–1956), Soviet mathematician, geophysicist, astronomer polar researcher, and author	MPC · 2108
2109 Dhôtel	1950 TH_{2}	André Dhôtel (1901–1991), French writer awarded with the Grand Prix de Litterature de l'Academie Francaise. He was a friend of the family of the discoverer, Sylvain Arend.	MPC · 2109
2110 Moore-Sitterly	1962 RD	Charlotte Moore Sitterly (1898–1990), American astronomer	MPC · 2110
2111 Tselina	1969 LG	Virgin Lands Campaign, soil development in the USSR	MPC · 2111
2112 Ulyanov	1972 NP	Aleksandr Ulyanov (1866–1887), Lenin's eldest brother	MPC · 2112
2113 Ehrdni	1972 RJ_{2}	Ehrdni Teldzhievich Delikov (1922–1942), Soviet hero of the Great Patriotic War	MPC · 2113
2114 Wallenquist	1976 HA	Åke Wallenquist (1904–1994), Swedish astronomer and a discoverer of minor planets	MPC · 2114
2115 Irakli	1976 UD	Irakli West, son of discoverer Richard Martin West	MPC · 2115
2116 Mtskheta	1976 UM	Mtskheta, city in Georgia (country)	MPC · 2116
2117 Danmark	1978 AC	Denmark, native country of discoverer Richard Martin West	MPC · 2117
2118 Flagstaff	1978 PB	Flagstaff, Arizona, home of the Lowell Observatory	MPC · 2118
2119 Schwall	1930 QG	August Schwall (1877–1947), staff member at Heidelberg Observatory, Germany	MPC · 2119
2120 Tyumenia	1967 RM	Tyumen Oblast, district of the Russian SFSR (now Russia)	MPC · 2120
2121 Sevastopol	1971 ME	Sevastopol, city on the Crimean peninsula	DMP · 2121
2122 Pyatiletka	1971 XB	Five-Year Plans of the USSR, named on the 50th anniversary of its adoption	MPC · 2122
2123 Vltava	1973 SL_{2}	Vltava River in the Czech Republic	MPC · 2123
2124 Nissen	1974 MK	Juan Jose Nissen (1901–1978), Argentinian astronomer and first director of the Felix Aguilar Observatory	MPC · 2124
2125 Karl-Ontjes	2005 P-L	Karl-Ontjes Groeneveld (born 1935), German physicist and brother of astronomer Ingrid van Houten-Groeneveld, who co-discovered this minor planet	DMP · 2125
2126 Gerasimovich	1970 QZ	Boris Petrovich Gerasimovich (1889–1937), Russian astrophysicist and director of the Pulkovo Observatory	MPC · 2126
2127 Tanya	1971 KB_{1}	Tanya Savicheva (1930–1944), a young Russian schoolgirl who died in Siege of Leningrad	MPC · 2127
2128 Wetherill	1973 SB	George Wetherill (1925–2006), American geochemist and planetary geologist	MPC · 2128
2129 Cosicosi	1973 SJ	Italian characterization of indifference	MPC · 2129
2130 Evdokiya	1974 QH_{1}	Evdokiya Efimovna Shchelokova, mother of the discoverer Lyudmila Zhuravleva	MPC · 2130
2131 Mayall	1975 RA	Nicholas Mayall (1906–1993), American astronomer	MPC · 2131
2132 Zhukov	1975 TW_{3}	Georgij Konstantinovich Zhukov (1896–1974), Soviet military commander	MPC · 2132
2133 Franceswright	1976 WB	Frances Woodworth Wright (1897–1989), American astronomer at Harvard University	MPC · 2133
2134 Dennispalm	1976 YB	Dennis Palm (1945–1974), amateur astronomer and assistant at Palomar Observatory	MPC · 2134
2135 Aristaeus	1977 HA	Aristaeus, Greek god	MPC · 2135
2136 Jugta	1933 OC	Jay U. Gunter (1911–1994), author of Tonight's Asteroids (hence, J.U.G. T.A.)	MPC · 2136
2137 Priscilla	1936 QZ	Priscilla Fairfield Bok (1896–1975), American astronomer, wife of Dutch-born American astronomer Bart Bok	DMP · 2137
2138 Swissair	1968 HB	Swissair, was the Swiss national airline	MPC · 2138
2139 Makharadze	1970 MC	The Georgian city of Ozurgeti (formerly known as Makharadze) is the twin city of Henichesk, Ukraine. It was named to honor the friendship between the two nations	DMP · 2139
2140 Kemerovo	1970 PE	Kemerovo Oblast, district in southwestern Siberia, Russia	DMP · 2140
2141 Simferopol	1970 QC_{1}	Simferopol, city on the Crimean peninsula	MPC · 2141
2142 Landau	1972 GA	Lev Davidovich Landau (1908–1968), Soviet physicist	MPC · 2142
2143 Jimarnold	1973 SA	James R. Arnold (1923–2012), professor of chemistry at the University of California at San Diego	MPC · 2143
2144 Marietta	1975 BC_{1}	Marietta Shaginyan (1888–1982), Soviet writer	MPC · 2144
2145 Blaauw	1976 UF	Adriaan Blaauw (1914–2010), Dutch astronomer at Leiden Observatory, director of ESO and president of the IAU	MPC · 2145
2146 Stentor	1976 UQ	Stentor, Greek warrior	MPC · 2146
2147 Kharadze	1976 US	Evgeni Kharadze (1907–2001), Georgian astronomer and director of the Abastumani Observatory and vice-president of the IAU from 1976 to 1982	DMP · 2147
2148 Epeios	1976 UW	Epeios, Greek soldier and builder of Trojan Horse	MPC · 2148
2149 Schwambraniya	1977 FX	Fictional land from Lev Kassil's Conduite and Schwambraniya	MPC · 2149
2150 Nyctimene	1977 TA	Nyctimene, a daughter of Epopeus, King of Lesbos	MPC · 2150
2151 Hadwiger	1977 VX	Hugo Hadwiger (1908–1981), Swiss mathematician	MPC · 2151
2152 Hannibal	1978 WK	Hannibal (c. 247–182 BC)	MPC · 2152
2153 Akiyama	1978 XD	Kaoru Akiyama (1901–1970), Japanese astronomer	MPC · 2153
2154 Underhill	2015 P-L	Anne B. Underhill, Canadian astrophysicist	DMP · 2154
2155 Wodan	6542 P-L	Odin ("Wōdan" in Old Saxon), Norse god in Teutonic mythology	DMP · 2155
2156 Kate	A917 SH	Kate, wife of astronomer L. K. Kristensen, who found the identification of this minor planet	MPC · 2156
2157 Ashbrook	A924 EF	Joseph Ashbrook (1918–1980), editor of Sky & Telescope	MPC · 2157
2158 Tietjen	1933 OS	Friedrich Tietjen (1832–1895), German astronomer	MPC · 2158
2159 Kukkamäki	1941 UX	Tauno Kukkamäki (1909–1997), Finnish geodesist	MPC · 2159
2160 Spitzer	1956 RL	Lyman Spitzer (1914–1997), American astrophysicist	MPC · 2160
2161 Grissom	1963 UD	Gus Grissom (1926–1967), American astronaut	MPC · 2161
2162 Anhui	1966 BE	Anhui, province in East China	MPC · 2162
2163 Korczak	1971 SP_{1}	Janusz Korczak (1878–1942), Polish writer who was murdered at Treblinka	MPC · 2163
2164 Lyalya	1972 RM_{2}	Yelena Konstantinova Ubiivovk (1918–1942), astronomy student and Soviet partisan who died in World War II	MPC · 2164
2165 Young	1956 RJ	Charles Augustus Young (1834–1908), American astronomer	MPC · 2165
2166 Handahl	1936 QB	Violet Handahl Green, mother of astronomer Daniel W. E. Green, who found the identifications for this planet	MPC · 2166
2167 Erin	1971 LA	Erin, daughter of astronomer George Punko at Bickley–Perth Observatory	MPC · 2167
2168 Swope	1955 RF_{1}	Henrietta Hill Swope (1902–1980), American astronomer	MPC · 2168
2169 Taiwan	1964 VP_{1}	Named for the Island of Taiwan (also see Taiwan)	MPC · 2169
2170 Byelorussia	1971 SZ	Republic of Belarus, a former Soviet Socialist Republic	MPC · 2170
2171 Kiev	1973 QD_{1}	City of Kyiv, capital of Ukraine, named on its 1500th anniversary	DMP · 2171
2172 Plavsk	1973 QA_{2}	Plavsk, district in Russia	DMP · 2172
2173 Maresjev	1974 QG_{1}	Alexei Maresiev (1916–2001), Russian war veteran	MPC · 2173
2174 Asmodeus	1975 TA	Asmodai, Babylonian god of lust	MPC · 2174
2175 Andrea Doria	1977 TY	Andrea Doria (1466–1560), Genoese admiral	MPC · 2175
2176 Donar	2529 P-L	Donar or Thor, Teutonic god of thunderstorms	DMP · 2176
2177 Oliver	6551 P-L	Bernard M. Oliver (1916–1995), researcher at Hewlett-Packard	MPC · 2177
2178 Kazakhstania	1972 RA_{2}	The Republic of Kazakhstan, a former Soviet Socialist Republic	MPC · 2178
2179 Platzeck	1965 MA	Ricardo Pablo Platzeck, Argentinian astronomer and director of the Cordoba Observatory	MPC · 2179
2180 Marjaleena	1940 RJ	Finnish Marjaleena Johnsson, daughter of the discoverer Heikki A. Alikoski	MPC · 2180
2181 Fogelin	1942 YA	Eric S. Fogelin, assistant at the Minor Planet Center	MPC · 2181
2182 Semirot	1953 FH_{1}	Pierre Sémirot (1907–1972), French astronomer	MPC · 2182
2183 Neufang	1959 OB	Neufang, village in Thuringia, Germany, where the Sonneberg Observatory is located	MPC · 2183
2184 Fujian	1964 TV_{2}	Fujian, coastal province in southeastern China	MPC · 2184
2185 Guangdong	1965 WO	Guangdong, coastal province in southern China	MPC · 2185
2186 Keldysh	1973 SQ_{4}	Mstislav Keldysh (1911–1978), Soviet physicist and mathematician	MPC · 2186
2187 La Silla	1976 UH	Mountain in the Atacama desert of Chile, where the La Silla Observatory is located	MPC · 2187
2188 Orlenok	1976 UL_{4}	Orlyonok All-Union Young Pioneer camp	MPC · 2188
2189 Zaragoza	1975 QK	Aldo Zaragoza (1924–1979) staff member at Felix Aguilar Observatory	MPC · 2189
2190 Coubertin	1976 GV_{3}	Baron Pierre de Coubertin (1863–1937), French educator and founder of the modern Olympic Games	MPC · 2190
2191 Uppsala	1977 PA_{1}	Uppsala, ancient Swedish city and its university	MPC · 2191
2192 Pyatigoriya	1972 HP	Pyatigorsk, Russian city in the Caucasus	MPC · 2192
2193 Jackson	1926 KB	Cyril V. Jackson (1903–1988), South African astronomer	MPC · 2193
2194 Arpola	1940 GE	Discoverer's summer cottage near Turku	MPC · 2194
2195 Tengström	1941 SP_{1}	Erik Tengström (1913–1996), Swedish astronomer and geodesist	DMP · 2195
2196 Ellicott	1965 BC	Andrew Ellicott Douglass (1867–1962), American astronomer	MPC · 2196
2197 Shanghai	1965 YN	Shanghai, largest city in China (and the world)	MPC · 2197
2198 Ceplecha	1975 VF	Zdeněk Ceplecha (1929–2009), Czech astronomer	MPC · 2198
2199 Kleť	1978 LA	Kleť Observatory, standing on Kleť Hill, Czech Republic	MPC · 2199
2200 Pasadena	6090 P-L	Pasadena, California, suburb of Los Angeles, California, United States	MPC · 2200

== 2201–2300 ==
back to top

Named minor planet	Provisional	This minor planet was named for...	Ref; Catalog
2201 Oljato	1947 XC	Moonlight Water, Monument Valley, Utah	DMP · 2201
2202 Pele	1972 RA	Pele, Polynesian fire goddess	MPC · 2202
2203 van Rhijn	1935 SQ_{1}	Pieter Johannes van Rhijn (1886–1960), Dutch astronomer	MPC · 2203
2204 Lyyli	1943 EQ	Lyyli Heinänen, Finnish astronomer and disciple of Yrjö Väisälä	MPC · 2204
2205 Glinka	1973 SU_{4}	Mikhail Glinka (1804–1857), Russian composer	MPC · 2205
2206 Gabrova	1976 GR_{3}	Gabrovo, Bulgarian town	MPC · 2206
2207 Antenor	1977 QH_{1}	Antenor, Trojan hero and sage of Greek mythology	JPL · 2207
2208 Pushkin	1977 QL_{3}	Aleksandr Pushkin, Russian poet	MPC · 2208
2209 Tianjin	1978 US_{1}	Tianjin, China	MPC · 2209
2210 Lois	9597 P-L	Lois J. Baldwin, wife of Ralph Belknap Baldwin, American astronomer	MPC · 2210
2211 Hanuman	1951 WO_{2}	Hanuman, monkey-god in mythology of India	MPC · 2211
2212 Hephaistos	1978 SB	Hephaestus, Greek god	MPC · 2212
2213 Meeus	1935 SO_{1}	Jean Meeus (born 1928), Belgian amateur astronomer	MPC · 2213
2214 Carol	1953 GF	Carol D. Valenti, Minor Planet Center staff member	DMP · 2214
2215 Sichuan	1964 VX_{2}	Sichuan, China	MPC · 2215
2216 Kerch	1971 LF	Hero City Kerch, Crimea	MPC · 2216
2217 Eltigen	1971 SK_{2}	a place where Soviet troops landed in November 1943 (see Kerch-Eltigen Operation)	MPC · 2217
2218 Wotho	1975 AK	Wotho Atoll, Marshall Islands	MPC · 2218
2219 Mannucci	1975 LU	Edgardo Mannucci, observatory mechanic	MPC · 2219
2220 Hicks	1975 VB	William B. Hicks, businessman	MPC · 2220
2221 Chilton	1976 QC	Jean Chilton McCrosky, wife of Richard Eugene McCrosky, American astronomer	MPC · 2221
2222 Lermontov	1977 ST_{1}	Mikhail Lermontov, Russian poet	MPC · 2222
2223 Sarpedon	1977 TL_{3}	Sarpedon, Greek warrior	MPC · 2223
2224 Tucson	2528 P-L	Tucson, Arizona, USA	MPC · 2224
2225 Serkowski	6546 P-L	Krzysztof Serkowski (1930–1981), Polish-born American astronomer	MPC · 2225
2226 Cunitza	1936 QC_{1}	Lydia Cunitz, discoverer's sister-in-law	MPC · 2226
2227 Otto Struve	1955 RX	Otto Struve (1897–1963), Russian-born American astronomer	MPC · 2227
2228 Soyuz-Apollo	1977 OH	The Apollo-Soyuz Test Project joint Soviet-American mission	MPC · 2228
2229 Mezzarco	1977 RO	Italian for half-arch, half-vault	MPC · 2229
2230 Yunnan	1978 UT_{1}	Yunnan, China	MPC · 2230
2231 Durrell	1941 SG	Lawrence Durrell (1912–1990), British author	MPC · 2231
2232 Altaj	1969 RD_{2}	Altai Republic, Russia	MPC · 2232
2233 Kuznetsov	1972 XE_{1}	Nikolai Kuznetsov, Soviet partisan and intelligence agent	MPC · 2233
2234 Schmadel	1977 HD	Lutz D. Schmadel (1942–2016), German astronomer	MPC · 2234
2235 Vittore	A924 GA	Observatory in Bologna, Italy	MPC · 2235
2236 Austrasia	1933 FX	Austrasia, kingdom of the Merovingian Franks	MPC · 2236
2237 Melnikov	1938 TB	Oleg Melnikov (1912–1982), Russian astronomer	MPC · 2237
2238 Steshenko	1972 RQ_{1}	Nikolai Steshenko, Soviet astronomer	MPC · 2238
2239 Paracelsus	1978 RC	Paracelsus (1493–1541), Swiss physician	MPC · 2239
2240 Tsai	1978 YA	Tsai Chang-hsien, Taiwanese astronomer	MPC · 2240
2241 Alcathous	1979 WM	Alcathous, mythological Greek	MPC · 2241
2242 Balaton	1936 TG	Lake Balaton, largest lake in Hungary	MPC · 2242
2243 Lönnrot	1941 SA_{1}	Elias Lönnrot (1802–1884), Finnish scholar, collector of folk tales and traditions	MPC · 2243
2244 Tesla	1952 UW_{1}	Nikola Tesla (1856–1943), Serbian-born electrical engineer and inventor	MPC · 2244
2245 Hekatostos	1968 BC	Greek for 100th (asteroid discovered by a joint program)	MPC · 2245
2246 Bowell	1979 XH	Edward L. G. Bowell (born 1943), American astronomer and discoverer of minor planets	MPC · 2246
2247 Hiroshima	6512 P-L	Hiroshima, Japan	MPC · 2247
2248 Kanda	1933 DE	Shigeru Kanda (1894–1974), Japanese science writer	DMP · 2248
2249 Yamamoto	1942 GA	Issei Yamamoto (1889–1959), Japanese astronomer	DMP · 2249
2250 Stalingrad	1972 HN	now Volgograd, Russia	DMP · 2250
2251 Tikhov	1977 SU_{1}	Gavriil Adrianovich Tikhov (1875–1960), Russian astronomer	MPC · 2251
2252 CERGA	1978 VT	CERGA French: Centre d'études et de recherches géodynamiques et astrométriques	MPC · 2252
2253 Espinette	1932 PB	house in Williams Bay, Wisconsin	MPC · 2253
2254 Requiem	1977 QJ_{1}	in memory of discoverer's mother	MPC · 2254
2255 Qinghai	1977 VK_{1}	Qinghai, China	MPC · 2255
2256 Wiśniewski	4519 P-L	Wiesław Z. Wiśniewski (1931–1994), Polish astronomer	MPC · 2256
2257 Kaarina	1939 QB	Kaarina Soini, daughter of discoverer	MPC · 2257
2258 Viipuri	1939 TA	now Vyborg, Russia	MPC · 2258
2259 Sofievka	1971 OG	park in Uman, Ukraine	MPC · 2259
2260 Neoptolemus	1975 WM_{1}	Neoptolemus, mythological Greek warrior	MPC · 2260
2261 Keeler	1977 HC	James Edward Keeler (1857–1900), American astronomer	MPC · 2261
2262 Mitidika	1978 RB	Gypsy girl from novel by Clemens Brentano	MPC · 2262
2263 Shaanxi	1978 UW_{1}	Shaanxi, China	MPC · 2263
2264 Sabrina	1979 YK	Sabrina, the legendary English princess and daughter of King Locrine, who drowned in the River Severn	MPC · 2264
2265 Verbaandert	1950 DB	Jean Verbaandert (1901–1974), Belgian geophysicist	MPC · 2265
2266 Tchaikovsky	1974 VK	Pyotr Ilyich Tchaikovsky (1840–1893), Russian composer	DMP · 2266
2267 Agassiz	1977 RF	Louis Agassiz (1807–1873), Swiss-born American zoologist and geologist	MPC · 2267
2268 Szmytowna	1942 VW	Maria Szmytowna, Polish chemist	MPC · 2268
2269 Efremiana	1976 JA_{2}	Ivan Yefremov (1908–1972), Soviet paleontologist and author	DMP · 2269
2270 Yazhi	1980 ED	Navajo for little one	MPC · 2270
2271 Kiso	1976 UV_{5}	Kiso Observatory, a station of the Tokyo Observatory	MPC · 2271
2272 Montezuma	1972 FA	Moctezuma II, 9th emperor of the Aztec empire	MPC · 2272
2273 Yarilo	1975 EV_{1}	Iarilo, Slavic sun god	DMP · 2273
2274 Ehrsson	1976 EA	A friend of discoverer Claes-Ingvar Lagerkvist	MPC · 2274
2275 Cuitlahuac	1979 MH	Cuitláhuac, tenth emperor of the Aztec empire	MPC · 2275
2276 Warck	1933 QA	Evelyne Warck, granddaughter of discoverer	MPC · 2276
2277 Moreau	1950 DS	Fernand Moreau (1888–1979), Belgian astronomer	MPC · 2277
2278 Götz	1953 GE	Paul Götz (1883–1962), German astronomer and discoverer of minor planets. Assistant to Max Wolf at Heidelberg.	MPC · 2278
2279 Barto	1968 DL	Agniya Barto (1906–1981), Soviet poet	DMP · 2279
2280 Kunikov	1971 SL_{2}	Tsezar Kunikov (1909–1943), Soviet commander and war hero whose troops seized Malaya Zemlya in 1943	MPC · 2280
2281 Biela	1971 UQ_{1}	Wilhelm von Biela (1782–1856), Austrian astronomer	MPC · 2281
2282 Andrés Bello	1974 FE	Andrés Bello (1781–1865), Venezuelan intellectual	MPC · 2282
2283 Bunke	1974 SV_{4}	Tamara Bunke (1937–1967), German patriot	DMP · 2283
2284 San Juan	1974 TG_{1}	San Juan Province and its university in Argentina	MPC · 2284
2285 Ron Helin	1976 QB	Ronald P. Helin, husband of Eleanor F. Helin, American astronomer	MPC · 2285
2286 Fesenkov	1977 NH	Vasily Fesenkov (1889–1972), Soviet astrophysicist	MPC · 2286
2287 Kalmykia	1977 QK_{3}	Kalmyk ASSR, Russian SFSR, now Kalmykia, Russia	MPC · 2287
2288 Karolinum	1979 UZ	The Collegium Carolinum, the main building of the Charles University in Prague	MPC · 2288
2289 McMillan	6567 P-L	Robert S. McMillan, American astronomer	MPC · 2289
2290 Helffrich	1932 CD_{1}	Joseph Helffrich (1890–1971), German astronomer and discoverer of minor planets	MPC · 2290
2291 Kevo	1941 FS	Field station on the Kevo River, Lapland	MPC · 2291
2292 Seili	1942 RM	Seili, island near Turku	MPC · 2292
2293 Guernica	1977 EH_{1}	Guernica, Spain	MPC · 2293
2294 Andronikov	1977 PL_{1}	Irakly Andronikov (1908–1990), Soviet writer	MPC · 2294
2295 Matusovskij	1977 QD_{1}	Mikhail Matusovskii (1915–1990), Soviet poet	MPC · 2295
2296 Kugultinov	1975 BA_{1}	David Nikitich Kugultinov (1922–2006), poet of Kalmykia and USSR	MPC · 2296
2297 Daghestan	1978 RE	Dagestan ASSR, Russian SFSR (now Dagestan, Russia)	MPC · 2297
2298 Cindijon	A915 TA	Cynthia and Jonathan, children of Brian G. Marsden	DMP · 2298
2299 Hanko	1941 SZ	Hanko, Finland	MPC · 2299
2300 Stebbins	1953 TG_{2}	Joel Stebbins (1878–1966), American astronomer	MPC · 2300

== 2301–2400 ==
back to top

Named minor planet	Provisional	This minor planet was named for...	Ref; Catalog
2301 Whitford	1965 WJ	Albert Whitford (1905–2002), American astronomer	MPC · 2301
2302 Florya	1972 TL_{2}	Nikolay Florea (1912–1941), Russian astronomer at Sternberg Astronomical Institute	MPC · 2302
2303 Retsina	1979 FK	Retsina, Greek wine	MPC · 2303
2304 Slavia	1979 KB	Slavia, sports club in Prague	MPC · 2304
2305 King	1980 RJ_{1}	Martin Luther King Jr. (1929–1968), U.S. civil rights leader	MPC · 2305
2306 Bauschinger	1939 PM	Julius Bauschinger (1860–1934), German astronomer	MPC · 2306
2307 Garuda	1957 HJ	Garuda is a son of Kasyapa and Vinata in the mythology of India	MPC · 2307
2308 Schilt	1967 JM	Jan Schilt (1894–1982), Dutch astronomer	MPC · 2308
2309 Mr. Spock	1971 QX_{1}	Discoverer's cat, "Mr. Spock", named after Spock, a fictional character from Star Trek	MPC · 2309
2310 Olshaniya	1974 SU_{4}	Konstantin Olshanskij, a Soviet war hero who entered Nazi-occupied Nikolaev in March 1944	DMP · 2310
2311 El Leoncito	1974 TA_{1}	Observing station at Félix Aguilar Observatory	MPC · 2311
2312 Duboshin	1976 GU_{2}	Georgii Nikolaevich Duboshin (1904–1986), Soviet astronomer and member of the IAU	DMP · 2312
2313 Aruna	1976 TA	Aruna, represents the red glow of dawn in mythology of India	MPC · 2313
2314 Field	1977 VD	George B. Field (born 1929), American astronomer	DMP · 2314
2315 Czechoslovakia	1980 DZ	Czechoslovakia, which split into the Czech Republic and Slovakia in 1993	MPC · 2315
2316 Jo-Ann	1980 RH	Jo-Ann Bowell, wife of discoverer	DMP · 2316
2317 Galya	2524 P-L	Galya Lubarsky, friend of Tom Gehrels	MPC · 2317
2318 Lubarsky	6521 P-L	Kronid Lyubarsky (1934–1996), friend of Tom Gehrels	MPC · 2318
2319 Aristides	7631 P-L	Aristides (530–468 BC), Athenian politician	MPC · 2319
2320 Blarney	1979 QJ	Blarney, Ireland	MPC · 2320
2321 Lužnice	1980 DB_{1}	Lužnice River, Czech Republic	MPC · 2321
2322 Kitt Peak	1954 UQ_{2}	Kitt Peak National Observatory, USA	MPC · 2322
2323 Zverev	1976 SF_{2}	Mitrofan Stepanovich Zverev (1903–1991), Russian astrometrist at Pulkovo Observatory	DMP · 2323
2324 Janice	1978 VS_{4}	Janice Cline, astronomy supporter	MPC · 2324
2325 Chernykh	1979 SP	Lyudmila (1935–2017) and Nikolai Chernykh (1931–2004), Russian astronomers and minor-planet discoverers	MPC · 2325
2326 Tololo	1965 QC	Cerro Tololo Inter-American Observatory, Chile	MPC · 2326
2327 Gershberg	1969 TQ_{4}	Roald Evgenevich Gershberg, Russian astronomer	MPC · 2327
2328 Robeson	1972 HW	Paul Robeson (1898–1976), American singer, actor and activist	DMP · 2328
2329 Orthos	1976 WA	Orthrus (Orthos), the two-headed dog from Greek mythology	MPC · 2329
2330 Ontake	1977 DS_{3}	Mount Ontake, volcano	MPC · 2330
2331 Parvulesco	1936 EA	Constantin Parvulesco (1890–1945), Romanian astronomer	MPC · 2331
2332 Kalm	1940 GH	Pehr Kalm (1716–1779), Finnish explorer, botanist, agricultural economist	MPC · 2332
2333 Porthan	1943 EP	Henrik Gabriel Porthan (1739–1804), Finnish historian	MPC · 2333
2334 Cuffey	1962 HD	James Cuffey (1911–1999), astronomy supporter	MPC · 2334
2335 James	1974 UB	James G. Williams, American mathematician and a discoverer of minor planets	MPC · 2335
2336 Xinjiang	1975 WL_{1}	Xinjiang, China	MPC · 2336
2337 Boubín	1976 UH_{1}	Boubín, mountain in Bohemia, Czech Republic	MPC · 2337
2338 Bokhan	1977 QA_{3}	Nadezhda Antonovna Bokhan, staff member at Institute of Theoretical Astronomy (ITA) in Leningrad	MPC · 2338
2339 Anacreon	2509 P-L	Anacreon (c. 582–485 BC), Greek poet	MPC · 2339
2340 Hathor	1976 UA	Hathor, Egyptian goddess	MPC · 2340
2341 Aoluta	1976 YU_{1}	Astronomical Observatory of Leningrad University	DMP · 2341
2342 Lebedev	1968 UQ	Nikolai Lebedev, Russian war hero	MPC · 2342
2343 Siding Spring	1979 MD_{4}	Siding Spring Observatory, Australia	MPC · 2343
2344 Xizang	1979 SC_{1}	Tibet	MPC · 2344
2345 Fučik	1974 OS	Julius Fučik (1903–1943), Czechoslovak journalist	DMP · 2345
2346 Lilio	1934 CB	Aloysius Lilius (c. 1510–1576), inventor of the Gregorian Calendar	DMP · 2346
2347 Vinata	1936 TK	Vinata, in mythology of India, daughter of Prajapati and wife of Kasyapa	MPC · 2347
2348 Michkovitch	1939 AA	Vojislav V. Michkovitch (1892–1976), Serbian astronomer	MPC · 2348
2349 Kurchenko	1970 OG	Nadezhda Kurchenko, heroic airline stewardess	DMP · 2349
2350 von Lüde	1938 CG	Heinz von Lüde (1914–1974), German ARI-astronomer	MPC · 2350
2351 O'Higgins	1964 VD	Bernardo O'Higgins (1778–1842), Chilean hero	MPC · 2351
2352 Kurchatov	1969 RY	Igor Kurchatov (1903–1960), Russian physicist	DMP · 2352
2353 Alva	1975 UD	former girlfriend of discoverer	MPC · 2353
2354 Lavrov	1978 PZ_{3}	Svyatoslav Sergeevich Lavrov (born 1923), Russian computer scientist	DMP · 2354
2355 Nei Monggol	1978 UV_{1}	Inner Mongolia, China	MPC · 2355
2356 Hirons	1979 UJ	Charles and Ann Hirons, parents-in-law of discoverer	MPC · 2356
2357 Phereclos	1981 AC	Phereclos, Trojan craftsman	MPC · 2357
2358 Bahner	1929 RE	Klaus Bahner (1921–), German staff member at Heidelberg Observatory	DMP · 2358
2359 Debehogne	1931 TV	Henri Debehogne (1928–2007), Belgian astronomer and discoverer of minor planets	MPC · 2359
2360 Volgo-Don	1975 VD_{3}	Volga–Don Canal, a canal that connects the Volga River and the Don River in Russia	DMP · 2360
2361 Gogol	1976 GQ_{1}	Nikolai Gogol (1809–1852), Russian-Ukrainian writer	DMP · 2361
2362 Mark Twain	1976 SH_{2}	Mark Twain (1835–1910), American writer	MPC · 2362
2363 Cebriones	1977 TJ_{3}	Cebriones, Hector's charioteer	MPC · 2363
2364 Seillier	1978 GD	Mother of discoverer	MPC · 2364
2365 Interkosmos	1980 YQ	Intercosmos, international space exploration organization	MPC · 2365
2366 Aaryn	1981 AC_{1}	Aaryn G. Baltutis, grandson of discoverer	MPC · 2366
2367 Praha	1981 AK_{1}	Prague, the capital city of the Czech Republic	MPC · 2367
2368 Beltrovata	1977 RA	Betty Tendering, friend of Swiss poet Gottfried Keller (1819–1890)	MPC · 2368
2369 Chekhov	1976 GC_{8}	Anton Chekhov (1860–1904), Russian writer	MPC · 2369
2370 van Altena	1965 LA	William F. van Altena, Dutch-born American astronomer and astrometrist at the Yale University Observatory	MPC · 2370
2371 Dimitrov	1975 VR_{3}	Georgi Dimitrov (1882–1949), Bulgarian politician	MPC · 2371
2372 Proskurin	1977 RA_{8}	Vitalij Fedorovich Proskurin (1919–1964), Russian astronomer	MPC · 2372
2373 Immo	1929 PC	Immo Appenzeller (born 1940), German astronomer and director of the Heidelberg Observatory	MPC · 2373
2374 Vladvysotskij	1974 QE_{1}	Vladimir Vysotsky (1938–1980), Russian singer	MPC · 2374
2375 Radek	1975 AA	Ctirad Kohoutek (1929–2011), Czech composer	MPC · 2375
2376 Martynov	1977 QG_{3}	Dmitrij Yakovlevich Martynov, Russian astrophysicist and director of the Sternberg Astronomical Institute	MPC · 2376
2377 Shcheglov	1978 QT_{1}	Vladimir Petrovich Shcheglov, Russian astronomer and director of the Astronomical Institute of the Uzbek	MPC · 2377
2378 Pannekoek	1935 CY	Antonie Pannekoek (1873–1960), Dutch astronomer	MPC · 2378
2379 Heiskanen	1941 ST	Veikko Aleksanteri Heiskanen (1895–1971), Finnish geodesist	MPC · 2379
2380 Heilongjiang	1965 SN	Heilongjiang, China	MPC · 2380
2381 Landi	1976 AF	Jorge Landi Dessy, Argentinian astronomer and a director of the Cordoba Observatory	MPC · 2381
2382 Nonie	1977 GA	Daughter of Peter Jekabsons, observatory staff	MPC · 2382
2383 Bradley	1981 GN	Martin and Maud Bradley, friends of discoverer	MPC · 2383
2384 Schulhof	1943 EC_{1}	Lipót Schulhof (1847–1921), Hungarian-born astronomer and a discoverer of minor planets	MPC · 2384
2385 Mustel	1969 VW	Evald Rudolfovich Mustel (1911–1988), Russian astronomer	DMP · 2385
2386 Nikonov	1974 SN_{1}	Vladimir Borisovich Nikonov (1905–1987), Soviet astronomer at the Crimean Astrophysical Observatory	DMP · 2386
2387 Xi'an	1975 FX	Xi'an, China	MPC · 2387
2388 Gaze	1977 EA_{2}	Vera Fedorovna Gaze (1899–1954), Russian astronomer at the Pulkovo Observatory	MPC · 2388
2389 Dibaj	1977 QC_{1}	Ernest Apushevich Dibaj (1931–1983), Russian astrophysicist	MPC · 2389
2390 Nežárka	1980 PA_{1}	Nežárka River, Czech Republic	MPC · 2390
2391 Tomita	1957 AA	Kōichirō Tomita (1925–2006), Japanese astronomer and a discoverer of minor planets	MPC · 2391
2392 Jonathan Murray	1979 MN_{1}	Jonathan Murray, son of Suzanne and Bruce C. Murray, friends of discoverers	MPC · 2392
2393 Suzuki	1955 WB	Keishin Suzuki (1905–), Japanese astronomer and professor of astronomy at Tokyo Gakugei University	MPC · 2393
2394 Nadeev	1973 SZ_{2}	Lev Nikolaevich Nadeev (1902–1974), Russian astrometrist and geodesist	MPC · 2394
2395 Aho	1977 FA	Arne J. Aho, a staff member at the Harvard Observatory	MPC · 2395
2396 Kochi	1981 CB	Kōchi, Japan	MPC · 2396
2397 Lappajärvi	1938 DV	Lappajärvi, lake in Finland	MPC · 2397
2398 Jilin	1965 UD_{2}	Jilin, China	MPC · 2398
2399 Terradas	1971 MA	Esteban Terradas i Illa (1883–1950), Spanish mathematician	MPC · 2399
2400 Derevskaya	1972 KJ	Alexandra Avramovna Derevskaya (1902–1959), a celebrated Russian foster mother who raised 48 orphans of different nationalities	DMP · 2400

== 2401–2500 ==
back to top

Named minor planet	Provisional	This minor planet was named for...	Ref; Catalog
2401 Aehlita	1975 VM_{2}	Aelita, fictional character from an eponymous novel by Aleksei Nikolaevich Tolstoi	DMP · 2401
2402 Satpaev	1979 OR_{13}	Kanysh Satbayev (1899–1964), Kazakh geologist	MPC · 2402
2403 Šumava	1979 SQ	Šumava mountains, Czech Republic	DMP · 2403
2404 Antarctica	1980 TE	Antarctica, in honour of the third Soviet Antarctic Expedition, in which the discoverer participated	DMP · 2404
2405 Welch	1963 UF	David Welch (born 1960), AURA administrator	MPC · 2405
2406 Orelskaya	1966 QG	Varvara Ivanovna Orel'skaya, Russian long-time staff member at the Institute for Theoretical Astronomy (ITA) in St. Petersburg	DMP · 2406
2407 Haug	1973 DH	Ulrich Haug (1929–1992), German astronomer	MPC · 2407
2408 Astapovich	1978 QK_{1}	Igor' Stanislavovich Astapovich (1908–1976), Russian meteoricist and professor at Kiev University	DMP · 2408
2409 Chapman	1979 UG	Clark R. Chapman, American astronomer	MPC · 2409
2410 Morrison	1981 AF	David Morrison (born 1940), American astronomer	MPC · 2410
2411 Zellner	1981 JK	Benjamin H. Zellner, American astronomer at the University of Arizona	MPC · 2411
2412 Wil	3537 P-L	Wil van de Hulst, wife of Dutch astronomer Hendrik C. van de Hulst	MPC · 2412
2413 van de Hulst	6816 P-L	Hendrik C. van de Hulst (1918–2000), Dutch astronomer	MPC · 2413
2414 Vibeke	1931 UG	Vibeke Kristensen, daughter of L. K. Kristensen who made the identifications for this asteroid	MPC · 2414
2415 Ganesa	1978 UJ	Ganesha, in mythology of India, represents call to spiritual power	MPC · 2415
2416 Sharonov	1979 OF_{13}	Vsevolod Vasil'evich Sharonov (1901–1964), Russian observatory director	DMP · 2416
2417 McVittie	1964 CD	George C. McVittie (1904–1988), American astronomer	MPC · 2417
2418 Voskovec-Werich	1971 UV	George Voskovec (1905–1981) and Jan Werich (1905–1980), Czech actors	MPC · 2418
2419 Moldavia	1974 SJ	Moldavian Soviet Socialist Republic	DMP · 2419
2420 Čiurlionis	1975 TN	Mikalojus Konstantinas Čiurlionis (1875–1911), Lithuanian painter and composer	MPC · 2420
2421 Nininger	1979 UD	Harvey H. Nininger (1887–1986), American meteoriticist	MPC · 2421
2422 Perovskaya	1968 HK_{1}	Sophia Perovskaya (1853–1881), Russian revolutionary	DMP · 2422
2423 Ibarruri	1972 NC	Rubén Ruiz Ibárruri (1920–1942), Soviet soldier of Spanish origin	DMP · 2423
2424 Tautenburg	1973 UT_{5}	Tautenburg, Germany	DMP · 2424
2425 Shenzhen	1975 FW	Shenzhen, China	MPC · 2425
2426 Simonov	1976 KV	Konstantin Mikhailovich Simonov (1915–1979), Russian writer	MPC · 2426
2427 Kobzar	1976 YQ_{7}	Taras Shevchenko (penname: Kobzar, 1814–1861), Ukrainian poet and painter	DMP · 2427
2428 Kamenyar	1977 RZ_{6}	Ivan Franko (a.k.a. Kamenyar; 1856–1916), Ukrainian writer and scientist	DMP · 2428
2429 Schürer	1977 TZ	Max Schürer (1910–1997), Swiss astronomer geodesist and mathematician, who initiated the construction of the Zimmerwald Observatory during his term as director of the Astronomical Institute of the University of Bern.	MPC · 2429
2430 Bruce Helin	1977 VC	Bruce Helin, son of one of the discoverers	MPC · 2430
2431 Skovoroda	1978 PF_{3}	Gregory Skovoroda (1722–1794), Ukrainian philosopher and poet	DMP · 2431
2432 Soomana	1981 FA	Hopi for star girl	DMP · 2432
2433 Sootiyo	1981 GJ	Hopi for star boy	DMP · 2433
2434 Bateson	1981 KA	Frank Bateson (1909–2007), New Zealand astronomer	MPC · 2434
2435 Horemheb	4578 P-L	Horemheb, Egyptian pharaoh	MPC · 2435
2436 Hatshepsut	6066 P-L	Hatshepsut, Egyptian queen	MPC · 2436
2437 Amnestia	1942 RZ	Amnesty International	MPC · 2437
2438 Oleshko	1975 VO_{2}	Valentina Iosifovna Oleshko (1924–1943), Russian partisan	DMP · 2438
2439 Ulugbek	1977 QX_{2}	Ulugh Beg, Uzbek sultan and astronomer	DMP · 2439
2440 Educatio	1978 VQ_{4}	Education	DMP · 2440
2441 Hibbs	1979 MN_{2}	Marka and Albert Hibbs, friends of one discoverer	MPC · 2441
2442 Corbett	1980 TO	Jim Corbett (1875–1955), hunter and writer	DMP · 2442
2443 Tomeileen	A906 BJ	Thomas and Eileen Marsden, parents of Brian G. Marsden	DMP · 2443
2444 Lederle	1934 CD	Trudpert Lederle (1922–2002), German astronomer	DMP · 2444
2445 Blazhko	1935 TC	Sergey Blazhko (1870–1956), Russian astronomer	DMP · 2445
2446 Lunacharsky	1971 TS_{2}	Anatoly Lunacharsky (1875–1933), Russian statesman and writer	DMP · 2446
2447 Kronstadt	1973 QY_{1}	Kronstadt, Russia	DMP · 2447
2448 Sholokhov	1975 BU	Mikhail Sholokhov (1905–1984), Russian writer	MPC · 2448
2449 Kenos	1978 GC	First man in mythology of Native Americans of Tierra del Fuego	MPC · 2449
2450 Ioannisiani	1978 RP	Bagrat Konstantinovich Ioannisiani (1911–1985), Russian telescope designer	DMP · 2450
2451 Dollfus	1980 RQ	Audouin Dollfus (1924–2010), French astronomer	MPC · 2451
2452 Lyot	1981 FE	Bernard Lyot (1897–1952), French astronomer	MPC · 2452
2453 Wabash	A921 SA	Bob Warshow (a.k.a. "Wabash"), American computer operator at the Harvard-Smithsonian Center for Astrophysics	MPC · 2453
2454 Olaus Magnus	1941 SS	Olaus Magnus (1490–1557), Swedish writer, cartographer, and Catholic clergyman	MPC · 2454
2455 Somville	1950 TO_{4}	Oscar Somville (1880–1980), Dutch seismologist at Uccle Observatory	MPC · 2455
2456 Palamedes	1966 BA_{1}	Palamedes, Greek commander	DMP · 2456
2457 Rublyov	1975 TU_{2}	Andrei Rublev, 14th-century Russian painter	MPC · 2457
2458 Veniakaverin	1977 RC_{7}	Veniamin Kaverin (1902–1989), Russian writer	MPC · 2458
2459 Spellmann	1980 LB_{1}	Leonard Spellmann, father of discoverer	MPC · 2459
2460 Mitlincoln	1980 TX_{4}	MIT and Lincoln Laboratory	MPC · 2460
2461 Clavel	1981 EC_{1}	Gustavine Clavel, centenarian	MPC · 2461
2462 Nehalennia	6578 P-L	Nehalennia, Celtic goddesses	MPC · 2462
2463 Sterpin	1934 FF	Julia Sterpin Van Biesbroeck, wife of discoverer	MPC · 2463
2464 Nordenskiöld	1939 BF	Adolf Erik Nordenskiöld (1832–1901), Finnish-born Swedish explorer	MPC · 2464
2465 Wilson	1949 PK	Robert Wilson (1927–2002), British astronomer	MPC · 2465
2466 Golson	1959 RJ	John C. Golson (1927–1984), American staff member at the Kitt Peak National Observatory	MPC · 2466
2467 Kollontai	1966 PJ	Alexandra Kollontai (1872–1952), Russian ambassador	MPC · 2467
2468 Repin	1969 TO_{1}	Ilya Repin (1844–1930), Russian painter	MPC · 2468
2469 Tadjikistan	1970 HA	Tajikistan	DMP · 2469
2470 Agematsu	1976 UW_{15}	Agematsu, Japan	MPC · 2470
2471 Ultrajectum	6545 P-L	Latin name for the city of Utrecht	MPC · 2471
2472 Bradman	1973 DG	Donald Bradman (1908–2001), Australian cricketer	MPC · 2472
2473 Heyerdahl	1977 RX_{7}	Thor Heyerdahl (1914–2002), explorer	MPC · 2473
2474 Ruby	1979 PB	Ruby, the discoverer's dog, which lives at the Kleť Observatory	DMP · 2474
2475 Semenov	1972 TF_{2}	Pavel Afanes'evich Semenov (1912–1942), Commander of a Soviet tank battalion in World War II	DMP · 2475
2476 Andersen	1976 JF_{2}	Hans Christian Andersen (1805–1875), Danish fabulist	MPC · 2476
2477 Biryukov	1977 PY_{1}	Nikolaj Zotovich Biryukov (1912–1966), Russian writer	DMP · 2477
2478 Tokai	1981 JC	Tōkai, Japan	DMP · 2478
2479 Sodankylä	1942 CB	Sodankylä, Finland	MPC · 2479
2480 Papanov	1976 YS_{1}	Anatoli Papanov (1922–1987), Russian actor	MPC · 2480
2481 Bürgi	1977 UQ	Jost Bürgi (1552–1632), Swiss clockmaker and maker of scientific instruments, astronomer, and independent inventor of logarithms	MPC · 2481
2482 Perkin	1980 CO	Richard S. and Gladys T. Perkin of Perkin-Elmer Corp., supporters of astronomy	MPC · 2482
2483 Guinevere	1928 QB	Guinevere, Arthurian queen	MPC · 2483
2484 Parenago	1928 TK	Pavel Petrovich Parenago (1906–1960), Russian astronomer	MPC · 2484
2485 Scheffler	1932 BH	Helmut Scheffler (1928–), German astronomer at Heidelberg Observatory	MPC · 2485
2486 Metsähovi	1939 FY	Metsähovi Observatory	MPC · 2486
2487 Juhani	1940 RL	Juhani Alikoski, son of Finnish discoverer Heikki A. Alikoski	MPC · 2487
2488 Bryan	1952 UT	William Lowe Bryan (1860–1955), university president	MPC · 2488
2489 Suvorov	1975 NY	Alexander Suvorov (1729–1800), Russian general and military scientist	MPC · 2489
2490 Bussolini	1976 AG	Juan A. Bussolini, S.J. (1905–1966), Argentine astronomer	MPC · 2490
2491 Tvashtri	1977 CB	Tvashtr, carpenter in mythology of India	MPC · 2491
2492 Kutuzov	1977 NT	Mikhail Kutuzov (1745–1813), Russian military leader	MPC · 2492
2493 Elmer	1978 XC	Charles Elmer (1872–1954), amateur astronomer	MPC · 2493
2494 Inge	1981 LF	Jay L. Inge, cartographer with the USGS and friend of the discoverer	DMP · 2494
2495 Noviomagum	7071 P-L	Latin name for the city of Nijmegen	MPC · 2495
2496 Fernandus	1953 TC_{1}	Fernandus Payne (1881–1977), American zoologist	MPC · 2496
2497 Kulikovskij	1977 PZ_{1}	Petr Grigor'evich Kulikovskii (1910–), Russian astronomer	DMP · 2497
2498 Tsesevich	1977 QM_{3}	Vladimir Platonovich Tsesevich (1907–1983), Russian astronomer and director of the Odessa University Observatory	DMP · 2498
2499 Brunk	1978 VJ_{7}	William E. Brunk (born 1928), American astronomer	MPC · 2499
2500 Alascattalo	1926 GC	Alascattalo, mythical beast of Alaska	MPC · 2500

== 2501–2600 ==
back to top

Named minor planet	Provisional	This minor planet was named for...	Ref; Catalog
2501 Lohja	1942 GD	Lohja, a city in Finland	MPC · 2501
2502 Nummela	1943 EO	Nummela, a town located in the municipality of Vihti, Finland	MPC · 2502
2503 Liaoning	1965 UB_{1}	Liaoning, a province in northeastern China	DMP · 2503
2504 Gaviola	1967 JO	Enrique Gaviola (1900–1989), Argentinian astrophysicist	DMP · 2504
2505 Hebei	1975 UJ	Hebei, China	MPC · 2505
2506 Pirogov	1976 QG_{1}	Nikolay Pirogov (1810–1881), Russian surgeon and scientist	MPC · 2506
2507 Bobone	1976 WB_{1}	Jorge Bobone (1901–1958), Argentinian astronomer	MPC · 2507
2508 Alupka	1977 ET_{1}	Alupka, Ukraine	MPC · 2508
2509 Chukotka	1977 NG	Chukotka Autonomous Okrug, Russia	DMP · 2509
2510 Shandong	1979 TH	Shandong, China	DMP · 2510
2511 Patterson	1980 LM	Clair Cameron Patterson (1922–1995), American geochemist	MPC · 2511
2512 Tavastia	1940 GG	Tavastia Region, Finland	MPC · 2512
2513 Baetslé	1950 SH	Paul-Louis Baetslé (1909–1983), Belgian professor of astronomy and geodesy at the Royal Military Academy and friend of the discoverer, Sylvain Arend	MPC · 2513
2514 Taiyuan	1964 TA_{1}	Taiyuan, Shaanxi, China	DMP · 2514
2515 Gansu	1964 TX_{1}	Gansu, China	DMP · 2515
2516 Roman	1964 VY	Nancy Roman (1925–2018), American astronomer	MPC · 2516
2517 Orma	1968 SB	Italian for trace; anagram of 1257 Móra	MPC · 2517
2518 Rutllant	1974 FG	Federico Rutllant Alcina (1904–1971), Spanish-born director of the national observatory in Chile	MPC · 2518
2519 Annagerman	1975 VD_{2}	Anna German (1936–1982), Soviet-born Polish singer	MPC · 2519
2520 Novorossijsk	1976 QF_{1}	Novorossiysk, Russia	DMP · 2520
2521 Heidi	1979 DK	Heidi, book by Johanna Spyri	MPC · 2521
2522 Triglav	1980 PP	Triglav, Slavic god	MPC · 2522
2523 Ryba	1980 PV	Jakub Jan Ryba (1765–1815), Czech composer	MPC · 2523
2524 Budovicium	1981 QB_{1}	Latin for České Budějovice, Czech Republic	DMP · 2524
2525 O'Steen	1981 VG	Mary Elizabeth O'Steen Skiff, mother of discoverer	DMP · 2525
2526 Alisary	1979 KX	Alice Benedicta Loethman West and Harry Richard West, parents of Danish astronomer Richard Martin West who discovered this minor planet	DMP · 2526
2527 Gregory	1981 RE	Bruce Gregory Thomas, youngest son of discoverer, named after James Gregory, Scottish astronomer	DMP · 2527
2528 Mohler	1953 TF_{1}	Orren Cuthbert Mohler (1908–1985), American astronomer	MPC · 2528
2529 Rockwell Kent	1977 QL_{2}	Rockwell Kent (1882–1971), American artist	MPC · 2529
2530 Shipka	1978 NC_{3}	Shipka Pass, battle site from the Russo-Turkish War	MPC · 2530
2531 Cambridge	1980 LD	Cambridge, England, and Cambridge, Massachusetts	DMP · 2531
2532 Sutton	1980 TU_{5}	Robert L. Sutton, American geologist with the USGS	MPC · 2532
2533 Fechtig	A905 VA	Hugo Fechtig (born 1929), German astrophysicist	MPC · 2533
2534 Houzeau	1931 VD	Jean-Charles Houzeau (1820–1888), Belgian astronomer	MPC · 2534
2535 Hämeenlinna	1939 DH	Hämeenlinna, Finland	MPC · 2535
2536 Kozyrev	1939 PJ	Nikolai Aleksandrovich Kozyrev (1908–1983), Russian astronomer	MPC · 2536
2537 Gilmore	1951 RL	Pamela M. Kilmartin and her husband Alan C. Gilmore (born 1944), New Zealand astronomers and minor-planet discoverers	MPC · 2537
2538 Vanderlinden	1954 UD	Henri Vanderlinden (1892–1983), Belgian astronomer	MPC · 2538
2539 Ningxia	1964 TS_{2}	Ningxia, China	DMP · 2539
2540 Blok	1971 TH_{2}	Alexander Blok (1880–1921), Russian poet	MPC · 2540
2541 Edebono	1973 DE	Edward de Bono (1933–2021), Maltese psychologist and philosopher	MPC · 2541
2542 Calpurnia	1980 CF	Calpurnia, Roman noblewoman and the last wife of Julius Caesar	DMP · 2542
2543 Machado	1980 LJ	Luiz Eduardo da Silva Machado, Brazilian astronomer and director of the Valongo Observatory	MPC · 2543
2544 Gubarev	1980 PS	Aleksei Gubarev (1931–2015), Soviet cosmonaut	DMP · 2544
2545 Verbiest	1933 BB	Ferdinand Verbiest (1623–1688), Belgian missionary and astronomer	MPC · 2545
2546 Libitina	1950 FC	Libitina, Roman goddess of funerals	MPC · 2546
2547 Hubei	1964 TC_{2}	Hubei, China	MPC · 2547
2548 Leloir	1975 DA	Luis Federico Leloir (1906–1987), Argentinian chemist	MPC · 2548
2549 Baker	1976 UB	James Gilbert Baker (1914–2005), American astronomer	MPC · 2549
2550 Houssay	1976 UP_{20}	Bernardo Houssay (1887–1971), Argentinian physiologist, winner of the Nobel Prize for Medicine and Physiology in 1947	MPC · 2550
2551 Decabrina	1976 YX_{1}	Decembrists, Russian revolutionaries	MPC · 2551
2552 Remek	1978 SP	Vladimír Remek (born 1948), Czech cosmonaut	DMP · 2552
2553 Viljev	1979 FS_{2}	Mikhail Anatolyevich Vilyev (1893–1919), Russian astronomer	DMP · 2553
2554 Skiff	1980 OB	Brian A. Skiff, American astronomer at Lowell Observatory and a discoverer of minor planets	DMP · 2554
2555 Thomas	1980 OC	Norman G. Thomas (born 1930), former Research assistant at Lowell Observatory and a discoverer of minor planets	DMP · 2555
2556 Louise	1981 CS	Carol Louise Thomas-Baltutis, youngest daughter of discoverer	DMP · 2556
2557 Putnam	1981 SL_{1}	Roger Putnam (1893–1972) and his son, Michael C. J. Putnam (1933–2025), astronomy supporters	MPC · 2557
2558 Viv	1981 SP_{1}	Vivian Russell Thomas, mother of discoverer	DMP · 2558
2559 Svoboda	1981 UH	Jindřich Svoboda (1884–1941), Czech astronomer	MPC · 2559
2560 Siegma	1932 CW	Siegfried A. Marx (born 1934), German astronomer and director of the Karl Schwarzschild Observatory	MPC · 2560
2561 Margolin	1969 TK_{2}	Mikhail Vladimirovich Margolin (1906–1975), blind inventor	DMP · 2561
2562 Chaliapin	1973 FF_{1}	Feodor Chaliapin (1873–1938), Russian singer and actor	MPC · 2562
2563 Boyarchuk	1977 FZ	Alexandr Boyarchuk (1931–2015), Russian astronomer	DMP · 2563
2564 Kayala	1977 QX	Kayala, river in The Tale of Igor's Campaign	MPC · 2564
2565 Grögler	1977 TB_{1}	Norbert Grögler (1928–1983), mineralogist and planetologist	MPC · 2565
2566 Kirghizia	1979 FR_{2}	Kyrgyzstan	DMP · 2566
2567 Elba	1979 KA	Elba Aguilera de Pizarro, mother of discoverers	DMP · 2567
2568 Maksutov	1980 GH	Dmitry Dmitrievich Maksutov (1896–1964), Russian optical engineer, inventor of the Maksutov telescope	DMP · 2568
2569 Madeline	1980 MA	Heroine of John Keats' poem, "The Eve of St. Agnes"	DMP · 2569
2570 Porphyro	1980 PG	Hero of John Keats' poem, "The Eve of St. Agnes"	DMP · 2570
2571 Geisei	1981 UC	Geisei, Japan	MPC · 2571
2572 Annschnell	1950 DL	Anneliese Schnell (1941–2015), Austrian astronomer	MPC · 2572
2573 Hannu Olavi	1953 EN	Son of discoverer	MPC · 2573
2574 Ladoga	1968 UP	Lake Ladoga	MPC · 2574
2575 Bulgaria	1970 PL	Bulgaria	MPC · 2575
2576 Yesenin	1974 QL	Sergei Yesenin (1895–1925), a Russian lyric poet	DMP · 2576
2577 Litva	1975 EE_{3}	Lithuanian Soviet Socialist Republic	MPC · 2577
2578 Saint-Exupéry	1975 VW_{3}	Antoine de Saint-Exupéry (1900–1944), French writer	MPC · 2578
2579 Spartacus	1977 PA_{2}	Spartacus (c. 111–71 BC), Roman revolutionary	MPC · 2579
2580 Smilevskia	1977 QP_{4}	Moisei Vasil'evich Smilevskii (1913–1944), Ukrainian journalist	MPC · 2580
2581 Radegast	1980 VX	Radegast, Slavic god	DMP · 2581
2582 Harimaya-Bashi	1981 SA	Harimaya Bridge located in Kōchi, Japan	DMP · 2582
2583 Fatyanov	1975 XA_{3}	Aleksej Ivanovich Fat'yanov (1919–1959), Soviet poet and songwriter	MPC · 2583
2584 Turkmenia	1979 FG_{2}	Turkmenistan	DMP · 2584
2585 Irpedina	1979 OJ_{15}	The Irkutsk Pedagogical Institute in Russia	MPC · 2585
2586 Matson	1980 LO	Dennis L. Matson, American planetary scientist at JPL	MPC · 2586
2587 Gardner	1980 OH	Martin Gardner (1914–2010), American mathematician and writer	DMP · 2587
2588 Flavia	1981 VQ	Flavius, Roman gens; also an asteroid in A Torrent of Faces by James Blish and Norman L. Knight	MPC · 2588
2589 Daniel	1979 QU_{2}	Daniel Lagerkvist, son of the discoverer	DMP · 2589
2590 Mourão	1980 KJ	Ronaldo Rogério de Freitas Mourão (1935–2014), Brazilian astronomer	MPC · 2590
2591 Dworetsky	1949 PS	Michael M. Dworetsky, British astronomer	MPC · 2591
2592 Hunan	1966 BW	Hunan, China	DMP · 2592
2593 Buryatia	1976 GB_{8}	Republic of Buryatia, Russia	DMP · 2593
2594 Acamas	1978 TB	Acamas, Thracian warrior and ally of Troy against the Greek during the Trojan War	MPC · 2594
2595 Gudiachvili	1979 KL	Lado Gudiashvili (1896–1980), Georgian painter	DMP · 2595
2596 Vainu Bappu	1979 KN	Vainu Bappu (1927–1982), Indian astrophysicist	MPC · 2596
2597 Arthur	1980 PN	King Arthur, mythological British king	DMP · 2597
2598 Merlin	1980 RY	Merlin, wizard in Arthurian legend	DMP · 2598
2599 Veselí	1980 SO	Veselí nad Lužnicí, a town in the Czech Republic	DMP · 2599
2600 Lumme	1980 VP	Kari Lumme, Finnish astronomer of the University of Helsinki	MPC · 2600

== 2601–2700 ==
back to top

Named minor planet	Provisional	This minor planet was named for...	Ref; Catalog
2601 Bologna	1980 XA	Bologna, Italy	DMP · 2601
2602 Moore	1982 BR	Patrick Moore (1923–2012), British amateur astronomer	DMP · 2602
2603 Taylor	1982 BW_{1}	Gordon E. Taylor, British amateur astronomer	DMP · 2603
2604 Marshak	1972 LD_{1}	Samuil Marshak (1887–1964), Russian poet and writer	MPC · 2604
2605 Sahade	1974 QA	Jorge Sahade (1915–2012), an Argentine astronomer, director of the La Plata and Cordoba Observatories, and former president of the IAU during 1985–1988	MPC · 2605
2606 Odessa	1976 GX_{2}	Odessa, Ukraine	DMP · 2606
2607 Yakutia	1977 NR	Sakha Republic (Sakha Yakutia Republic) in Russia	DMP · 2607
2608 Seneca	1978 DA	Seneca the Younger (c. 4 BC – AD 65), Roman writer	DMP · 2608
2609 Kiril-Metodi	1978 PB_{4}	Saints Cyril and Methodius (826–869 and 815–885), brothers, Byzantine Christian theologians and Christian missionaries, as well as inventors of Cyrillic	DMP · 2609
2610 Tuva	1978 RO_{1}	Tuva Republic, Russia	DMP · 2610
2611 Boyce	1978 VQ_{5}	Joseph M. Boyce, American planetary scientist	MPC · 2611
2612 Kathryn	1979 DE	Kathryn Gail Thomas-Hazelton, daughter of discoverer	MPC · 2612
2613 Plzeň	1979 QE	Plzeň, Czech Republic, birthplace of the discoverer	DMP · 2613
2614 Torrence	1980 LP	Torrence V. Johnson, American planetary scientist	MPC · 2614
2615 Saito	1951 RJ	Keiji Saito, Japanese astrophysicist	MPC · 2615
2616 Lesya	1970 QV	Larisa Petrovna Kosach(a.k.a. Lesya Ukrainka), Ukrainian poet	MPC · 2616
2617 Jiangxi	1975 WO_{1}	Jiangxi, China	DMP · 2617
2618 Coonabarabran	1979 MX_{2}	Coonabarabran, Australia. The Siding Spring Observatory of the Research School of Astronomy and Astrophysics of the Australian National University is located close by (40 km distant)	DMP · 2618
2619 Skalnaté Pleso	1979 MZ_{3}	Skalnaté Pleso, observatory in Slovakia	DMP · 2619
2620 Santana	1980 TN	Carlos Santana (born 1947), American musician	MPC · 2620
2621 Goto	1981 CA	Seizo Goto, Japanese businessman	MPC · 2621
2622 Bolzano	1981 CM	Bernard Bolzano (1781–1848), Bohemian mathematician and theologian	DMP · 2622
2623 Zech	A919 SA	Gert Zech (born 1941), German astronomer, member of the editorial team of Astronomy and Astrophysics Abstracts	MPC · 2623
2624 Samitchell	1962 RE	Samuel Alfred Mitchell (1874–1960), American astronomer	MPC · 2624
2625 Jack London	1976 JQ_{2}	Jack London (1876–1916), American writer	MPC · 2625
2626 Belnika	1978 PP_{2}	Nikolai Belyaev, Russian astronomer	MPC · 2626
2627 Churyumov	1978 PP_{3}	Klim Ivanovich Churyumov, Ukrainian astronomer	MPC · 2627
2628 Kopal	1979 MS_{8}	Zdeněk Kopal (1914–1993), Czech astronomer	DMP · 2628
2629 Rudra	1980 RB_{1}	Rudra, destroyer aspect of the Hindu god Siva	MPC · 2629
2630 Hermod	1980 TF_{3}	Hermóðr, hero in Norse mythology	MPC · 2630
2631 Zhejiang	1980 TY_{5}	Zhejiang, China	DMP · 2631
2632 Guizhou	1980 VJ_{1}	Guizhou, China	DMP · 2632
2633 Bishop	1981 WR_{1}	George Bishop (1785–1861), English wine merchant and patron of astronomy	MPC · 2633
2634 James Bradley	1982 DL	James Bradley (1693–1762), English astronomer and Astronomer Royal	MPC · 2634
2635 Huggins	1982 DS	William Huggins (1824–1910), English spectroscopist	MPC · 2635
2636 Lassell	1982 DZ	William Lassell (1799–1880), English merchant and amateur astronomer	MPC · 2636
2637 Bobrovnikoff	A919 SB	Nicholas T. Bobrovnikoff, American astronomer	MPC · 2637
2638 Gadolin	1939 SG	Jakob Gadolin (1719–1802), Swedish Lutheran bishop and astronomer, as well as Johan Gadolin (1760–1852), the "father of Finnish chemistry"	MPC · 2638
2639 Planman	1940 GN	Anders Planman (1724–1803), Finnish astronomer	MPC · 2639
2640 Hällström	1941 FN	Gustaf Gabriel Hällström (1775–1844), Finnish physicist	MPC · 2640
2641 Lipschutz	1949 GJ	Michael E. Lipschutz, American geochemist	MPC · 2641
2642 Vésale	1961 RA	Andreas Vesalius (1514–1564), Flemish anatomist	MPC · 2642
2643 Bernhard	1973 SD	Prince Bernhard of Lippe-Biesterfeld (1911–2004), Dutch supporter of astronomy	MPC · 2643
2644 Victor Jara	1973 SO_{2}	Víctor Jara (1932–1973), Chilean folk singer	MPC · 2644
2645 Daphne Plane	1976 QD	Daphne Plane, librarian and friend of discoverer	DMP · 2645
2646 Abetti	1977 EC_{1}	Antonio Abetti (1846–1928) and Giorgio Abetti (1882–1982), Italian astronomers	MPC · 2646
2647 Sova	1980 SP	Antonín Sova (1864–1928), Czech poet	MPC · 2647
2648 Owa	1980 VJ	Hopi for rock	DMP · 2648
2649 Oongaq	1980 WA	Hopi for from up there	DMP · 2649
2650 Elinor	1931 EG	Elinor Gates, assistant at the Minor Planet Center	MPC · 2650
2651 Karen	1949 QD	Karen S. Mayer, sister-in-law of, and Karen S. Franz, friend of F. N. Bowman	DMP · 2651
2652 Yabuuti	1953 GM	Kiyosi Yabuuti, Japanese astronomer and historian	MPC · 2652
2653 Principia	1964 VP	Philosophiae Naturalis Principia Mathematica, Isaac Newton's magnum opus	MPC · 2653
2654 Ristenpart	1968 OG	Friedrich Wilhelm Ristenpart (1868–1913), German astronomer	MPC · 2654
2655 Guangxi	1974 XX	Guangxi, China	DMP · 2655
2656 Evenkia	1979 HD_{5}	Evenk Autonomous Okrug, Russia	DMP · 2656
2657 Bashkiria	1979 SB_{7}	Republic of Bashkortostan, Russia	DMP · 2657
2658 Gingerich	1980 CK	Owen Gingerich (1930–2023), American astrophysicist and historian of astronomy	MPC · 2658
2659 Millis	1981 JX	Robert L. Millis, American astronomer	DMP · 2659
2660 Wasserman	1982 FG	Lawrence H. Wasserman, American astronomer and discoverer of minor planets	DMP · 2660
2661 Bydžovský	1982 FC_{1}	Bohumil Bydžovský (1880–1969), Czech mathematician	MPC · 2661
2662 Kandinsky	4021 P-L	Wassily Kandinsky (1866–1944), Russian painter	MPC · 2662
2663 Miltiades	6561 P-L	Miltiades (c. 550–489 BC), Athenian commander in ancient Greece	MPC · 2663
2664 Everhart	1934 RR	Edgar Everhart, American astronomer and director of the Chamberlin Observatory	MPC · 2664
2665 Schrutka	1938 DW_{1}	Guntram Schrutka (1910–1995), Austrian astronomer and professor of astronomy at Vienna University Src	MPC · 2665
2666 Gramme	1951 TA	Zénobe Gramme (1826–1901), Belgian electrical engineer and inventor	MPC · 2666
2667 Oikawa	1967 UO	Okuro Oikawa (1896–1980), Japanese astronomer and discoverer of minor planets	MPC · 2667
2668 Tataria	1976 QV	Republic of Tatarstan, Russia	DMP · 2668
2669 Shostakovich	1976 YQ_{2}	Dmitri Shostakovich (1906–1975), Russian composer	DMP · 2669
2670 Chuvashia	1977 PW_{1}	Chuvash Republic, Russia	DMP · 2670
2671 Abkhazia	1977 QR_{2}	Abkhazia, Georgia	DMP · 2671
2672 Písek	1979 KC	Písek, Czech Republic	DMP · 2672
2673 Lossignol	1980 KN	Lossignol, family name of friends of discoverer	MPC · 2673
2674 Pandarus	1982 BC_{3}	Pandarus, mythological Greek warrior	MPC · 2674
2675 Tolkien	1982 GB	J. R. R. Tolkien (1892–1973), British writer	DMP · 2675
2676 Aarhus	1933 QV	Aarhus, Denmark, seat of the Ole Rømer Observatory of the University of Aarhus	DMP · 2676
2677 Joan	1935 FF	Joan Jordan, secretary at the Harvard-Smithsonian Center for Astrophysics	MPC · 2677
2678 Aavasaksa	1938 DF_{1}	Aavasaksa, mountain in Finland (Lapland), one of the sites used by Maupertuis' expedition to determine the length of a degree of the meridian in 1736–1737	MPC · 2678
2679 Kittisvaara	1939 TG	Kittisvaara, mountain in Finland (Lapland), one of the sites used by Maupertuis' expedition to determine the length of a degree of the meridian in 1736–1737	MPC · 2679
2680 Mateo	1975 NF	José Mateo (1914–1978), Argentinian astronomer	MPC · 2680
2681 Ostrovskij	1975 VF_{2}	Nikolai Ostrovsky (1904–1936), Soviet writer	MPC · 2681
2682 Soromundi	1979 MF_{4}	From Latin for sisters of the world, after the YWCA	DMP · 2682
2683 Brian	1981 AD_{1}	Eldest son of discoverer	DMP · 2683
2684 Douglas	1981 AH_{1}	Douglas B. Thomas, American physicist at NIST and brother of astronomer Norman G. Thomas who discovered this minor planet	DMP · 2684
2685 Masursky	1981 JN	Harold Masursky (1922–1990), American geologist and astronomer	DMP · 2685
2686 Linda Susan	1981 JW_{1}	Linda Susan Salazar, discoverer's youngest daughter	MPC · 2686
2687 Tortali	1982 HG	Tortali, Vanuatun spirit of daytime	MPC · 2687
2688 Halley	1982 HG_{1}	Edmond Halley (1656–1742), English astronomer	DMP · 2688
2689 Bruxelles	1935 CF	Brussels, Belgium	MPC · 2689
2690 Ristiina	1938 DG_{1}	Ristiina, Finland	MPC · 2690
2691 Sérsic	1974 KB	José Luis Sérsic (1933–1993), Argentinian astronomer	MPC · 2691
2692 Chkalov	1976 YT_{3}	Valery Chkalov (1904–1938), Soviet test pilot	DMP · 2692
2693 Yan'an	1977 VM_{1}	Yan'an, Shaanxi, China	MPC · 2693
2694 Pino Torinese	1979 QL_{1}	Pino Torinese, Italy, site of Turin Observatory	DMP · 2694
2695 Christabel	1979 UE	Christabel, poem by Samuel Taylor Coleridge	DMP · 2695
2696 Magion	1980 HB	Magion 1, first Czech artificial satellite launched into orbit in 1978	DMP · 2696
2697 Albina	1969 TC_{3}	Albina Alekseevna Serova, friend of discoverer	MPC · 2697
2698 Azerbajdzhan	1971 TZ	Azerbaijan	DMP · 2698
2699 Kalinin	1976 YX	Mikhail Kalinin (1875–1946), Soviet statesman	MPC · 2699
2700 Baikonur	1976 YP_{7}	Baikonur Cosmodrome, Kazakhstan	DMP · 2700

== 2701–2800 ==
back to top

Named minor planet	Provisional	This minor planet was named for...	Ref; Catalog
2701 Cherson	1978 RT	Kherson, Ukraine (not to be confused with Chersonesos, Crimea)	MPC · 2701
2702 Batrakov	1978 SZ_{2}	Yury Vasilyevich Batrakov, Russian astronomer and deputy director of the Institute for Theoretical Astronomy (ITA)	MPC · 2702
2703 Rodari	1979 FT_{2}	Gianni Rodari (1920–1980), Italian writer	MPC · 2703
2704 Julian Loewe	1979 MR_{4}	Julian Loewe, an American journalist and science writer for the Pasadena Star-News	DMP · 2704
2705 Wu	1980 TD_{4}	Sherman S. C. Wu, photogrammetrist with the USGS	MPC · 2705
2706 Borovský	1980 VW	Karel Havlíček Borovský (1821–1856), Czech writer and political journalist	MPC · 2706
2707 Ueferji	1981 QS_{3}	Universidade Federal do Rio de Janeiro	MPC · 2707
2708 Burns	1981 WT	Joseph A. Burns (born 1941), American astronomer and discoverer of minor planets	MPC · 2708
2709 Sagan	1982 FH	Carl Sagan (1934–1996), American astronomer and author, co-founder of the Planetary Society	MPC · 2709
2710 Veverka	1982 FQ	Joseph Veverka (born 1941), American astronomer	MPC · 2710
2711 Aleksandrov	1978 QB_{2}	Anatoly Alexandrov (1903–1994), Russian physicist	MPC · 2711
2712 Keaton	1937 YD	Buster Keaton (1895–1966), film comedian	MPC · 2712
2713 Luxembourg	1938 EA	Luxembourg	MPC · 2713
2714 Matti	1938 GC	Son of discoverer	MPC · 2714
2715 Mielikki	1938 US	Mielikki from Finnish mythology	MPC · 2715
2716 Tuulikki	1939 TM	Tuulikki from Finnish mythology, Goddess of the woods	MPC · 2716
2717 Tellervo	1940 WJ	Tellervo from Finnish mythology	MPC · 2717
2718 Handley	1951 OM	Tommy Handley (1892–1949), British radio comedian	MPC · 2718
2719 Suzhou	1965 SU	Suzhou, Jiangsu, China	MPC · 2719
2720 Pyotr Pervyj	1972 RV_{3}	Peter the Great (1672–1725), Russian tsar	DMP · 2720
2721 Vsekhsvyatskij	1973 SP_{2}	Sergej Konstantinovich Vsekhsvyatskij, Soviet astronomer and professor at Kiev University	MPC · 2721
2722 Abalakin	1976 GM_{2}	Viktor Kuzmich Abalakin, Russian astronomer at the Institute for Theoretical Astronomy (ITA)	MPC · 2722
2723 Gorshkov	1978 QL_{2}	Pyotr Mikhaylovich Gorshkov (1883–1975), Russian astronomer and geodesist at Leningrad University	MPC · 2723
2724 Orlov	1978 RZ_{5}	Sergej Vladimirovich Orlov (1880–1958), professor at Moscow University, and Aleksandr Yakovlevich Orlov (1880–1954), founder and first director or the Golosseevo Astronomical Observatory	MPC · 2724
2725 David Bender	1978 VG_{3}	David F. Bender, American astronomer, latterly of the Jet Propulsion Laboratory	MPC · 2725
2726 Kotelnikov	1979 SE_{9}	Vladimir Kotelnikov (1908–2005), Russian radio engineer	MPC · 2726
2727 Paton	1979 SO_{9}	Evgeny Paton (1870–1953) and Borys Paton (1918–), Soviet Ukrainian scientists	MPC · 2727
2728 Yatskiv	1979 ST_{9}	Yaroslav Stepanovich Yatskiv, Ukrainian astrometrist and geodynamicist	MPC · 2728
2729 Urumqi	1979 UA_{2}	Urumqi, Xinjiang, China	MPC · 2729
2730 Barks	1981 QH	Carl Barks (1901–2000), American writer and illustrator	MPC · 2730
2731 Cucula	1982 KJ	The cuckoo	MPC · 2731
2732 Witt	1926 FG	Carl Gustav Witt (1866–1946), German astronomer and discoverer of minor planets	MPC · 2732
2733 Hamina	1938 DQ	Hamina, Finland	MPC · 2733
2734 Hašek	1976 GJ_{3}	Jaroslav Hašek (1883–1923), Czech writer	MPC · 2734
2735 Ellen	1977 RB	Ellen Howell (born 1961), American planetary scientist, discoverer of minor planets and of comet 88P/Howell. She was married to astronomer Schelte J. Bus.	DMP · 2735
2736 Ops	1979 OC	Ops, Roman goddess	MPC · 2736
2737 Kotka	1938 DU	Kotka, Finland	MPC · 2737
2738 Viracocha	1940 EC	Viracocha, supreme god of the Inca	MPC · 2738
2739 Taguacipa	1952 UZ_{1}	Taguacipa, god of the Inca and companion of Viracocha	MPC · 2739
2740 Tsoj	1974 SY_{4}	Viktor Tsoi (1962–1990), poet and rock musician	MPC · 2740
2741 Valdivia	1975 XG	Pedro de Valdivia (1497–1553), Spanish conquistador and first governor of Chile	MPC · 2741
2742 Gibson	1981 JG_{3}	James B. Gibson, American astronomer and discoverer of minor planets including 1943 Anteros	DMP · 2742
2743 Chengdu	1965 WR	Chengdu, Sichuan, China	MPC · 2743
2744 Birgitta	1975 RB	Anna Birgitta Angelica Lagerkvist, daughter of the discoverer	MPC · 2744
2745 San Martín	1976 SR_{10}	José de San Martín (1778–1850), "father of Argentina"	MPC · 2745
2746 Hissao	1979 SJ_{9}	Hissar Astronomical Observatory, Dushanbe, Tajikistan	MPC · 2746
2747 Český Krumlov	1980 DW	Český Krumlov, Czech Republic	MPC · 2747
2748 Patrick Gene	1981 JF_{2}	Patrick Gene Shoemaker, son of discoverer	MPC · 2748
2749 Walterhorn	1937 TD	Walter Horn (1908–1995), founder of the public observatory and amateur astronomical society in Solingen, Germany	MPC · 2749
2750 Loviisa	1940 YK	Loviisa, Finland	MPC · 2750
2751 Campbell	1962 RP	William Wallace Campbell (1862–1938), American astronomer	MPC · 2751
2752 Wu Chien-Shiung	1965 SP	Chien-Shiung Wu (1912–1997),	MPC · 2752
2753 Duncan	1966 DH	John Charles Duncan (1882–1967), American astronomer	MPC · 2753
2754 Efimov	1966 PD	Mikhail Efimov (1881–1919), Russian pioneering aviator	MPC · 2754
2755 Avicenna	1973 SJ_{4}	Avicenna (c. 980–1037), medieval philosopher and scientist	MPC · 2755
2756 Dzhangar	1974 SG_{1}	Epic of Jangar, then thought of the Kalmyk people, now known to originate among Mongols	MPC · 2756
2757 Crisser	1977 VN	Cristina, wife of discoverer, and Sergio, discoverer	MPC · 2757
2758 Cordelia	1978 RF	Cordelia, character in Shakespeare's King Lear	MPC · 2758
2759 Idomeneus	1980 GC	Idomeneus, Greek warrior	MPC · 2759
2760 Kacha	1980 TU_{6}	Kacha, cosmonaut training centre in the Crimea	MPC · 2760
2761 Eddington	1981 AE	Arthur Eddington (1882–1944), British astrophysicist, on the occasion of the centennial of his birth	MPC · 2761
2762 Fowler	1981 AT	Ralph H. Fowler (1889–1944), British astrophysicist	MPC · 2762
2763 Jeans	1982 OG	James Jeans (1877–1946), British physicist, astronomer, and mathematician	MPC · 2763
2764 Moeller	1981 CN	Sonia Louise Moeller-Thomas, mother of discoverer	MPC · 2764
2765 Dinant	1981 EY	Dinant, Belgium	MPC · 2765
2766 Leeuwenhoek	1982 FE_{1}	Antonie van Leeuwenhoek (1632–1723), Dutch scientist and "Father of Microbiology"	MPC · 2766
2767 Takenouchi	1967 UM	Tadeo Takenouchi (born 1922), Japanese astronomer	MPC · 2767
2768 Gorky	1972 RX_{3}	Maxim Gorky (1868–1936), Russian writer	MPC · 2768
2769 Mendeleev	1976 GZ_{2}	Dmitri Mendeleev (1834–1907), Russian chemist	MPC · 2769
2770 Tsvet	1977 SM_{1}	Mikhail Tsvet (1872–1919), Russian-Italian physiologist and botanist who invented chromatography	MPC · 2770
2771 Polzunov	1978 SP_{7}	Ivan Polzunov (1728–1766), Russian inventor	MPC · 2771
2772 Dugan	1979 XE	Raymond Smith Dugan (1878–1940), American astronomer and discoverer of minor planets	MPC · 2772
2773 Brooks	1981 JZ_{2}	William Robert Brooks (1844–1921), American astronomer	MPC · 2773
2774 Tenojoki	1942 TJ	Tenojoki, river	MPC · 2774
2775 Odishaw	1953 TX_{2}	Hugh Odishaw (1916–1984), American geophysicist	MPC · 2775
2776 Baikal	1976 SZ_{7}	Lake Baikal, Russia	MPC · 2776
2777 Shukshin	1979 SY_{11}	Vasilii Makarovich Shukshin (1929–1974), Russian writer and actor	MPC · 2777
2778 Tangshan	1979 XP	Tangshan in China, location of a massive (Magnitude 7.8) earthquake in 1976	MPC · 2778
2779 Mary	1981 CX	Maryanna Ruth Thomas, wife of discoverer	MPC · 2779
2780 Monnig	1981 DO_{2}	Oscar Monnig (1902–1999), American businessman, meteorite hunter and founder of the collection that bears his name. He donated the collection to Texas Christian University	MPC · 2780
2781 Kleczek	1982 QH	Josip Kleczek (1923–2014), Czech astronomer	MPC · 2781
2782 Leonidas	2605 P-L	Leonidas I (c. 540–480 BC), Spartan king in ancient Greece	MPC · 2782
2783 Chernyshevskij	1974 RA_{2}	Nikolay Chernyshevsky (1828–1889), Russian writer and philosopher	MPC · 2783
2784 Domeyko	1975 GA	Ignacy Domeyko (1802–1889), Polish-born chemist and mineralogist, latterly Rector of the University of Chile	MPC · 2784
2785 Sedov	1978 QN_{2}	Leonid I. Sedov (1907–1999), Russian astronomer or Georgy Sedov, Russian polar explorer	MPC · 2785
2786 Grinevia	1978 RR_{5}	Alexander Grin (1880–1932), Russian writer	MPC · 2786
2787 Tovarishch	1978 RC_{6}	Tovarishch, Russian sailing ship	MPC · 2787
2788 Andenne	1981 EL	Andenne, Belgium	MPC · 2788
2789 Foshan	1956 XA	Foshan, Guangdong, China	MPC · 2789
2790 Needham	1965 UU_{1}	Joseph Needham (1900–1995), British sinologist	MPC · 2790
2791 Paradise	1977 CA	Paradise, California	MPC · 2791
2792 Ponomarev	1977 EY_{1}	Nikolaj Georgievich Ponomarev (1900–1942), Russian designer of astronomical instruments	MPC · 2792
2793 Valdaj	1977 QV	Valdai Hills, near Moscow	MPC · 2793
2794 Kulik	1978 PS_{3}	Leonid Kulik (1883–1942), Russian mineralogist	MPC · 2794
2795 Lepage	1979 YM	Théophile Lepage (1901–1991), Belgian mathematician	MPC · 2795
2796 Kron	1980 EC	Gerald E. Kron, American astronomer at Lick Observatory and Flagstaff Station	MPC · 2796
2797 Teucer	1981 LK	Teucer, Greek soldier	MPC · 2797
2798 Vergilius	2009 P-L	Virgil, Roman poet	MPC · 2798
2799 Justus	3071 P-L	Justus Cramer, descendant of H. G. van de Sande Bakhuyzen, Dutch astronomer	MPC · 2799
2800 Ovidius	4585 P-L	Ovid, Roman poet	MPC · 2800

== 2801–2900 ==
back to top

Named minor planet	Provisional	This minor planet was named for...	Ref; Catalog
2801 Huygens	1935 SU_{1}	Christiaan Huygens (1629–1695), Dutch astronomer who studied Saturn's rings and discovered its moon Titan	MPC · 2801
2802 Weisell	1939 BU	Weisell Väisälä, father of the discoverer, Yrjö Väisälä (1891–1971)	MPC · 2802
2803 Vilho	1940 WG	Vilho Väisälä (1889–1969), Finnish meteorologist and physicist, brother of Kalle and Yrjö Väisälä	MPC · 2803
2804 Yrjö	1941 HF	Yrjö Väisälä (1891–1971), Finnish astronomer and discoverer of minor planets, brother of Vilho and Kalle	MPC · 2804
2805 Kalle	1941 UM	Kalle Väisälä (1893–1968), Finnish scientist, brother of Vilho and Yrjö	MPC · 2805
2806 Graz	1953 GG	City of Graz, capital of the Austrian province of Styria	MPC · 2806
2807 Karl Marx	1969 TH_{6}	Karl Marx (1818–1883), German philosopher and political economist	MPC · 2807
2808 Belgrano	1976 HS	Manuel Belgrano (1770–1820), Argentine general	MPC · 2808
2809 Vernadskij	1978 QW_{2}	Vladimir Vernadsky (1863–1945), Russian geochemist and mineralogist	MPC · 2809
2810 Lev Tolstoj	1978 RU_{5}	Leo Tolstoy (1828–1910), Russian writer	MPC · 2810
2811 Střemchoví	1980 JA	Střemchoví, a village in the Czech Republic, where the discoverer, Antonín Mrkos, was born	MPC · 2811
2812 Scaltriti	1981 FN	Franco Scaltriti, Italian astronomer at the Observatory of Turin	MPC · 2812
2813 Zappalà	1981 WZ	Vincenzo Zappalà (born 1945), Italian astronomer, discoverer of minor planets, and expert in the hierarchical clustering method to determine asteroid families	MPC · 2813
2814 Vieira	1982 FA_{3}	Gilson Vieira, Brazilian astronomer at the Valongo Observatory	MPC · 2814
2815 Soma	1982 RL	The Soma cube, mathematical game	MPC · 2815
2816 Pien	1982 SO	Armand Pien, Belgian (Flemish) television meteorologist of the Royal Meteorological Institute in Uccle	MPC · 2816
2817 Perec	1982 UJ	Georges Perec (1936–1982), French novelist, filmmaker and essayist	MPC · 2817
2818 Juvenalis	2580 P-L	Juvenal, first and second-century Roman satirist	MPC · 2818
2819 Ensor	1933 UR	James Ensor (1860–1949), Belgian expressionist painter	MPC · 2819
2820 Iisalmi	1942 RU	Iisalmi, Finland	MPC · 2820
2821 Slávka	1978 SQ	Sláva Vávrová, the discoverer's mother	MPC · 2821
2822 Sacajawea	1980 EG	Sacagawea (1788–1812), Shoshone explorer	MPC · 2822
2823 van der Laan	2010 P-L	Harry van der Laan, Dutch astrophysicist at the Leiden Observatory	MPC · 2823
2824 Franke	1934 CZ	Ernst K. Franke, American biophysicist at the University of Cincinnati	MPC · 2824
2825 Crosby	1938 SD_{1}	Bing Crosby (1903–1977), American singer and actor	MPC · 2825
2826 Ahti	1939 UJ	Ahti, Finnish sea god	MPC · 2826
2827 Vellamo	1942 CC	Vellamo, Finnish sea goddess, consort of Ahti	MPC · 2827
2828 Iku-Turso	1942 DL	Iku-Turso, Finnish sea monster	MPC · 2828
2829 Bobhope	1948 PK	Bob Hope (1903–2003), American comedian	MPC · 2829
2830 Greenwich	1980 GA	Royal Greenwich Observatory, London, UK	MPC · 2830
2831 Stevin	1930 SZ	Simon Stevin (1548–1620), Flemish scientist	MPC · 2831
2832 Lada	1975 EC_{1}	Lada, Slavic goddess	MPC · 2832
2833 Radishchev	1978 PC_{4}	Alexander Radishchev (1749–1802), Russian author and social critic	MPC · 2833
2834 Christy Carol	1980 TB_{4}	Daughter of the discoverer	MPC · 2834
2835 Ryoma	1982 WF	Sakamoto Ryōma (1836–1867), Japanese samurai	DMP · 2835
2836 Sobolev	1978 YQ	Viktor Viktorovich Sobolev, Russian astrophysicist	MPC · 2836
2837 Griboedov	1971 TJ_{2}	Alexander Griboyedov (1795–1829), Russian playwright	MPC · 2837
2838 Takase	1971 UM_{1}	Bunshiro Takase (1924–2015), Japanese astronomer	MPC · 2838
2839 Annette	1929 TP	Daughter of the discoverer	MPC · 2839
2840 Kallavesi	1941 UP	Lake Kallavesi, Finland	MPC · 2840
2841 Puijo	1943 DM	Puijo Hill, Lake Kallavesi, Finland	MPC · 2841
2842 Unsöld	1950 OD	Albrecht Unsöld (1905–1995), German astronomer	MPC · 2842
2843 Yeti	1975 XQ	Yeti, cryptozoological Himalayan humanoid	MPC · 2843
2844 Hess	1981 JP	Frederick Hess, American astronomer	MPC · 2844
2845 Franklinken	1981 OF	Kenneth Franklin (1923–2007), American astronomer	MPC · 2845
2846 Ylppö	1942 CJ	Arvo Ylppö (1887–1992), Finnish pediatrician	MPC · 2846
2847 Parvati	1959 CC_{1}	Parvati, Hindu goddess, consort of Siva	MPC · 2847
2848 ASP	1959 VF	Astronomical Society of the Pacific	MPC · 2848
2849 Shklovskij	1976 GN_{3}	Iosif Shklovsky (1916–1985), Russian astronomer	MPC · 2849
2850 Mozhaiskij	1978 TM_{7}	Alexander Mozhaysky (1825–1890), Russian aviation pioneer	MPC · 2850
2851 Harbin	1978 UQ_{2}	Harbin, China	MPC · 2851
2852 Declercq	1981 QU_{2}	Maiden name of the discovere'rs wife	MPC · 2852
2853 Harvill	1963 RG	Richard A. Harvill (1905–1988), astronomical supporter	MPC · 2853
2854 Rawson	1964 JE	Guillermo Colesbery Rawson (1825–1890), Argentine physician	MPC · 2854
2855 Bastian	1931 TB_{2}	Ulrich Bastian (born 1951), German astronomer	MPC · 2855
2856 Röser	1933 GB	Siegfried Röser (born 1948), German astronomer	MPC · 2856
2857 NOT	1942 DA	Nordic Optical Telescope	MPC · 2857
2858 Carlosporter	1975 XB	Carlos Porter (1867–1942), Chilean zoologist	MPC · 2858
2859 Paganini	1978 RW_{1}	Niccolò Paganini (1782–1840), Italian violinist	MPC · 2859
2860 Pasacentennium	1978 TA	The U.S. city of Pasadena in California, on the occasion of its centennial anniversary of its incorporation into Los Angeles County in 1886	MPC · 2860
2861 Lambrecht	1981 VL_{2}	Hermann Lambrecht (1908–1983), German astronomer	MPC · 2861
2862 Vavilov	1977 JP	Nikolai Vavilov (1887–1943), a Soviet botanist, as well as Sergey Vavilov (1891–1951), Soviet physicist	MPC · 2862
2863 Ben Mayer	1981 QG_{2}	Ben Mayer (1925–1999), American astronomer	MPC · 2863
2864 Soderblom	1983 AZ	Lawrence A. Soderblom, American planetary scientist with the United States Geological Survey	MPC · 2864
2865 Laurel	1935 OK	Stan Laurel (1890–1965), British comedian	MPC · 2865
2866 Hardy	1961 TA	Oliver Hardy (1892–1957), American comedian	MPC · 2866
2867 Šteins	1969 VC	Kārlis Šteins (1911–1983), Latvian astronomer	MPC · 2867
2868 Upupa	1972 UA	Upupa epops, the hoopoe	MPC · 2868
2869 Nepryadva	1980 RM_{2}	Russian victory over Tataro-Mongols in the Battle of Kulikovo near	MPC · 2869
2870 Haupt	1981 LD	Hermann Haupt (1873–1959), Austrian astronomer	MPC · 2870
2871 Schober	1981 QC_{2}	Hans Josef Schober, Austrian astronomer at the University of Graz	MPC · 2871
2872 Gentelec	1981 RU	GTE Research Laboratories, Waltham, Massachusetts	MPC · 2872
2873 Binzel	1982 FR	Richard P. Binzel (born 1958), American astronomer and discoverer of minor planets	MPC · 2873
2874 Jim Young	1982 TH	James Whitney Young (born 1941), American astronomer and discoverer of minor planets	MPC · 2874
2875 Lagerkvist	1983 CL	Claes-Ingvar Lagerkvist (born 1944), Swedish astronomer	MPC · 2875
2876 Aeschylus	6558 P-L	Aeschylus, Ancient Greek playwright	MPC · 2876
2877 Likhachev	1969 TR_{2}	Dmitry Likhachov (1906–1999), Soviet philologist	MPC · 2877
2878 Panacea	1980 RX	Panacea, Greek goddess	MPC · 2878
2879 Shimizu	1932 CB_{1}	Shin-ichi Shimizu (1889–1986) Japanese amateur astronomer	MPC · 2879
2880 Nihondaira	1983 CA	Nihondaira, Shizuoka, Japan	MPC · 2880
2881 Meiden	1983 AA_{1}	Medeina, Lithuanian god	MPC · 2881
2882 Tedesco	1981 OG	Edward Francis Tedesco (Ed Tedesco), American astronomer and planetary scientist at JPL, PSI and member of the IAU (Src)	MPC · 2882
2883 Barabashov	1978 RG_{6}	Nikolai P. Barabashov (1894–1971), Soviet astronomer	MPC · 2883
2884 Reddish	1981 ES_{22}	Vincent Cartledge Reddish (1926–2015), British astronomer	MPC · 2884
2885 Palva	1939 TC	Tauno Pavla, Finnish ear surgeon, son-in-law of astronomer Yrjö Väisälä, who discovered this minor planet	MPC · 2885
2886 Tinkaping	1965 YG	Tin Ka Ping, Hong Kong industrialist	MPC · 2886
2887 Krinov	1977 QD_{5}	Yevgeny Krinov (1906–1984), Soviet meteoriticist	MPC · 2887
2888 Hodgson	1982 TO	Richard G. Hodgson, American astronomer and professor of physics at Dordt College, Sioux Center, Iowa	MPC · 2888
2889 Brno	1981 WT_{1}	Brno, Czech Republic	MPC · 2889
2890 Vilyujsk	1978 SY_{7}	Vilyuysk, Yakut ASSR, Russia	MPC · 2890
2891 McGetchin	1980 MD	Thomas R. McGetchin (1936–1979), American planetary scientist	MPC · 2891
2892 Filipenko	1983 AX_{2}	Aleksandr Grigorevich Filipenko, Chief of Surgery at the hospital in Bakhchisarai on the Crimean peninsula	MPC · 2892
2893 Peiroos	1975 QD	Peiroos (Peirous), Thracian war leader from the city of Aenus and an ally of King Priam against the Greek during the Trojan War	MPC · 2893
2894 Kakhovka	1978 SH_{5}	Kakhovka, Ukraine	MPC · 2894
2895 Memnon	1981 AE_{1}	Memnon, Ethiopian king, ally of Troy	MPC · 2895
2896 Preiss	1931 RN	Gunter Preiss (born 1929), a German lawyer and administrator of the Max Planck Society who supported several astronomical projects such as the construction of the Calar Alto Observatory in Spain	MPC · 2896
2897 Ole Römer	1932 CK	Ole Rømer (1644–1710), Danish astronomer	MPC · 2897
2898 Neuvo	1938 DN	Yrjö Neuvo, grandson of Finnish astronomer Yrjö Väisälä, who discovered this minor planet	MPC · 2898
2899 Runrun Shaw	1964 TR_{2}	Run Run Shaw (1907–2014), Chinese film producer	MPC · 2899
2900 Luboš Perek	1972 AR	Luboš Perek (1919–2020), Czech astronomer	MPC · 2900

== 2901–3000 ==
back to top

Named minor planet	Provisional	This minor planet was named for...	Ref; Catalog
2901 Bagehot	1973 DP	Walter Bagehot (1826–1877), British writer	MPC · 2901
2902 Westerlund	1980 FN_{3}	Bengt E. Westerlund, Swedish astronomer and director of the Uppsala Astronomical Observatory	MPC · 2902
2903 Zhuhai	1981 UV_{9}	Zhuhai, China	MPC · 2903
2904 Millman	1981 YB	Peter Millman (1906–1990), Canadian astronomer	MPC · 2904
2905 Plaskett	1982 BZ_{2}	John Stanley Plaskett (1865–1941), Canadian astronomer	MPC · 2905
2906 Caltech	1983 AE_{2}	California Institute of Technology	MPC · 2906
2907 Nekrasov	1975 TT_{2}	Nikolay Nekrasov (1821–1878), Russian poet	MPC · 2907
2908 Shimoyama	1981 WA	Shimoyama, village in Japan	MPC · 2908
2909 Hoshi-no-ie	1983 JA	Hoshi-no-ie Observatory, Japan; the name means 'star house'	MPC · 2909
2910 Yoshkar-Ola	1980 TK_{13}	Yoshkar-Ola, Russia	MPC · 2910
2911 Miahelena	1938 GJ	Miahelena, wife of Finnish astronomer Heikki A. Alikoski (1912–1997), who discovered this minor planet	MPC · 2911
2912 Lapalma	1942 DM	La Palma, the Spanish island, home to many observatories	MPC · 2912
2913 Horta	1931 TK	Victor Horta (1861–1947), Belgian architect	MPC · 2913
2914 Glärnisch	1965 SB	Glärnisch mountain, summit of the Swiss Alps	MPC · 2914
2915 Moskvina	1977 QY_{2}	Valentina Nikolaevna Moskvina, Russian doctor at the Bakhchisaraj regional hospital on the Crimean peninsula	MPC · 2915
2916 Voronveliya	1978 PW_{2}	Boris Vorontsov-Velyaminov (1904–1994), Soviet–Russian astrophysicist and astronomer	MPC · 2916
2917 Sawyer Hogg	1980 RR	Helen Sawyer Hogg (1905–1993), American-Canadian astronomer	MPC · 2917
2918 Salazar	1980 TU_{4}	Frederick Salazar, son-in-law of astronomer Carolyn S. Shoemaker who discovered this minor planet	MPC · 2918
2919 Dali	1981 EX_{18}	Salvador Dalí (1904–1989), Catalan-Spanish artist	MPC · 2919
2920 Automedon	1981 JR	Automedon, mythological Greek soldier	MPC · 2920
2921 Sophocles	6525 P-L	Sophocles (c. 496–405 BC), Greek dramatist	MPC · 2921
2922 Dikanʹka	1976 GY_{1}	Gogol's Evenings on a Farm Near Dikanka	MPC · 2922
2923 Schuyler	1977 DA	Catherine Schuyler, Minor Planet Center administrator	MPC · 2923
2924 Mitake-mura	1977 DJ_{2}	Mitake, a former village in Japan	MPC · 2924
2925 Beatty	1978 VC_{5}	J. Kelly Beatty, astronomy writer and editor of Sky & Telescope	MPC · 2925
2926 Caldeira	1980 KG	J.F.C. Caldeira, Brazilian astronomer at the Valongo Observatory and professor at the Universidade Federal do Rio de Janeiro	MPC · 2926
2927 Alamosa	1981 TM	Alamosa, Colorado	MPC · 2927
2928 Epstein	1976 GN_{8}	Isadore Epstein (1919–1995), Estonian–American astronomer	MPC · 2928
2929 Harris	1982 BK_{1}	Alan W. Harris, American planetary scientist and pioneer in the study of rotational lightcurves of minor planets	MPC · 2929
2930 Euripides	6554 P-L	Euripides (c. 480–406 BC), Greek dramatist	MPC · 2930
2931 Mayakovsky	1969 UC	Vladimir Mayakovsky (1893–1930), Russian poet, artist and actor	MPC · 2931
2932 Kempchinsky	1980 TK_{4}	Paula Kempchinsky, daughter-in-law of astronomer Carolyn S. Shoemaker who discovered this minor planet	MPC · 2932
2933 Amber	1983 HN	Amber Marie Baltutis, granddaughter of astronomer Norman G. Thomas who discovered this minor planet	MPC · 2933
2934 Aristophanes	4006 P-L	Aristophanes (c. 446–386 BC), Greek dramatist	MPC · 2934
2935 Naerum	1976 UU	Nærum, a suburb north of Copenhagen	MPC · 2935
2936 Nechvíle	1979 SF	Vincence Nechvíle (1890–1964), Czech astronomer	MPC · 2936
2937 Gibbs	1980 LA	Josiah Willard Gibbs (1839–1903), American scientist	MPC · 2937
2938 Hopi	1980 LB	The Hopi, the Native American people	MPC · 2938
2939 Coconino	1982 DP	Coconino County, Arizona containing the Hopi and Navajo Nation Reservations. The Lowell Observatory is in the county seat, Flagstaff	MPC · 2939
2940 Bacon	3042 P-L	Francis Bacon (1561–1626), English philosopher, statesman, and essayist	MPC · 2940
2941 Alden	1930 YV	Alden, son of American astronomer Clyde Tombaugh, who discovered this minor planet	MPC · 2941
2942 Cordie	1932 BG	Cordula "Cordie" Robinson, American planetary geologist	MPC · 2942
2943 Heinrich	1933 QU	Inge Heinrich (born 1941), German astronomer	MPC · 2943
2944 Peyo	1935 QF	Peyo, pseudonym of Pierre Culliford, Belgian illustrator	MPC · 2944
2945 Zanstra	1935 ST_{1}	Herman Zanstra (1894–1972), Dutch astronomer	MPC · 2945
2946 Muchachos	1941 UV	Roque de los Muchachos, site in the Canary Islands of several international observatories	MPC · 2946
2947 Kippenhahn	1955 QP_{1}	Rudolf Kippenhahn (1926–2020), German astrophysicist and science author	MPC · 2947
2948 Amosov	1969 TD_{2}	Nikolai Mikhailovich Amosov, Ukrainian cardiologist	MPC · 2948
2949 Kaverznev	1970 PR	Aleksandr Aleksandrovich Kaverznev (1932–1983), Soviet television journalist	MPC · 2949
2950 Rousseau	1974 VQ_{2}	Jean-Jacques Rousseau (1712–1778), Swiss philosopher from Geneva	MPC · 2950
2951 Perepadin	1977 RB_{8}	Aleksandr Ivanovich Perepadin Soviet agriculturalist and friend of the discoverer, Nikolai Chernykh	MPC · 2951
2952 Lilliputia	1979 SF_{2}	Lilliput, fictional land in Gulliver's Travels	MPC · 2952
2953 Vysheslavia	1979 SV_{11}	Leonid Nikolaevich Vysheslavskii (Vysheslavsky), Soviet poet and author of "Stellar Sonnets"	MPC · 2953
2954 Delsemme	1982 BT_{1}	Armand Hubert Delsemme, a Belgian-born astronomer at the University of Toledo in Ohio. (3218 Delphine was named for his wife.)	MPC · 2954
2955 Newburn	1982 BX_{1}	Ray L. Newburn, American astronomer	MPC · 2955
2956 Yeomans	1982 HN_{1}	Donald K. Yeomans, American astronomer and celestial mechanician at the Jet Propulsion Laboratory	MPC · 2956
2957 Tatsuo	1934 CB_{1}	Tatsuo Yamada (1923–2009), Japanese astronomer and observer of variable stars. He was the director of the variable star section of the Oriental Astronomical Association.	MPC · 2957
2958 Arpetito	1981 DG	E. Araya, J. Perez, R. Tighe and A Torrecon, staff personnel at ESO's La Silla Observatory, who prepared the photographic plates for observations of minor planets with the "Grand Prism Objectif"	MPC · 2958
2959 Scholl	1983 RE_{2}	Hans Scholl (born 1942), German astronomer and discoverer of minor planets. He worked at the Astronomisches Rechen-Institut in Heidelberg.	MPC · 2959
2960 Ohtaki	1977 DK_{3}	Ohtaki, town in Japan	MPC · 2960
2961 Katsurahama	1982 XA	Katsurahama, seashore resort in Kōchi, home city of the discoverer, Tsutomu Seki	MPC · 2961
2962 Otto	1940 YF	The discoverer's great-grandfather	MPC · 2962
2963 Chen Jiageng	1964 VM_{1}	Tan Kah Kee (Chen Jiageng; 1874–1961), Singaporean businessman, community leader, and philanthropist	MPC · 2963
2964 Jaschek	1974 OA_{1}	Carlos Jaschek (1926–1999), German-born Argentinian astronomer	MPC · 2964
2965 Surikov	1975 BX	Vasily Surikov (1848–1916), Russian painter	MPC · 2965
2966 Korsunia	1977 EB_{2}	Korsun, Ukrainian city	MPC · 2966
2967 Vladisvyat	1977 SS_{1}	Vladimir Svyatoslavich (c. 958–1015), medieval prince of Kiev	MPC · 2967
2968 Iliya	1978 QJ	Ilya Muromets, legendary Russian hero	MPC · 2968
2969 Mikula	1978 RU_{1}	Mikula Selyaninovich, Russian legendary hero	MPC · 2969
2970 Pestalozzi	1978 UC	Johann Heinrich Pestalozzi (1746–1827), Swiss educational reformer	MPC · 2970
2971 Mohr	1980 YL	Josef M. Mohr (1901–1979), Czech astronomer	MPC · 2971
2972 Niilo	1939 TB	Niilo Anselmi Väisälä, great-grandson of the Finish discoverer, Yrjö Väisälä	MPC · 2972
2973 Paola	1951 AJ	Her Majesty Queen Paola of Belgium (born 1937; née Ruffo di Calabria)	MPC · 2973
2974 Holden	1955 QK	Edward S. Holden (1846–1914), American astronomer	MPC · 2974
2975 Spahr	1970 AF_{1}	Timothy B. Spahr (born 1970), American astronomer	MPC · 2975
2976 Lautaro	1974 HR	Lautaro (c. 1534–1557), leader of the Araucanians of Chile	MPC · 2976
2977 Chivilikhin	1974 SP	Vladimir Alekseevich Chivilikhin (1928–1984), Russian author	MPC · 2977
2978 Roudebush	1978 SR	Susan Roudebush, astronomical administrator	MPC · 2978
2979 Murmansk	1978 TB_{7}	The port city of Murmansk in Russia	MPC · 2979
2980 Cameron	1981 EU_{17}	Alastair G. W. Cameron (1925–2005), Canadian astrophysicist	MPC · 2980
2981 Chagall	1981 EE_{20}	Marc Chagall (1887–1985), Belarusian artist	MPC · 2981
2982 Muriel	1981 JA_{3}	Muriel May Scott Shoemaker, mother-in-law of American astronomer Carolyn S. Shoemaker, who discovered this minor planet	MPC · 2982
2983 Poltava	1981 RW_{2}	Poltava, Ukrainian SSR (now Ukraine)	MPC · 2983
2984 Chaucer	1981 YD	Geoffrey Chaucer (1343–1400), English poet and author	MPC · 2984
2985 Shakespeare	1983 TV_{1}	William Shakespeare (1564–1616), English playwright	MPC · 2985
2986 Mrinalini	2525 P-L	Mrinalini Sarabhai (1918–2016), classical Indian dancer and choreographer	MPC · 2986
2987 Sarabhai	4583 P-L	Vikram Sarabhai (1919–1971), Indian space scientist	MPC · 2987
2988 Korhonen	1943 EM	Tapio Korhonen, Finnish maker of telescopes and optics. He created the optical system of the Nordic Optical Telescope.	MPC · 2988
2989 Imago	1976 UF_{1}	The Latin word for 'image'	MPC · 2989
2990 Trimberger	1981 EN_{27}	Stephen Trimberger (born 1955), American astronomer and computer scientist	MPC · 2990
2991 Bilbo	1982 HV	Bilbo Baggins, character in The Lord of the Rings	MPC · 2991
2992 Vondel	2540 P-L	Joost van den Vondel (1587–1679), Dutch poet and playwright	MPC · 2992
2993 Wendy	1970 PA	Wendy, wife of astronomer Peter Birch. This was the first discovered made at the Bickley-Perth Observatory	MPC · 2993
2994 Flynn	1975 PA	Vicki Marie Flynn, wife of Mike Candy, who was a staff member at the Bickley-Perth Observatory	MPC · 2994
2995 Taratuta	1978 QK	Evgeniya Aleksandrovna Taratuta, Soviet writer	MPC · 2995
2996 Bowman	1954 RJ	Fred N. Bowman, American volunteer astronomer at the Cincinnati Observatory	MPC · 2996
2997 Cabrera	1974 MJ	Laurentino Ascencio Cabrera (1917–2003), Argentinian astronomer	MPC · 2997
2998 Berendeya	1975 TR_{3}	Berendeya, the magical land in The Snow Maiden by Alexander Ostrovsky	MPC · 2998
2999 Dante	1981 CY	Dante Alighieri (c. 1265–1321), Italian poet from Florence	MPC · 2999
3000 Leonardo	1981 EG_{19}	Leonardo da Vinci (1452–1519), Italian genius from Florence	MPC · 3000

back to top

Preceded by 1,001–2,000	Meanings of minor-planet names List of minor planets: 2,001–3,000	Succeeded by 3,001–4,000
