= Vasilevskis =

Vasilevskis may refer to:

- Vadims Vasiļevskis (born 1982), a Latvian javelin thrower
- 2014 Vasilevskis, a main-belt asteroid discovered on May 2, 1973
