= 2094 Magnitka =

Flora asteroid from the inner regions of the asteroid belt

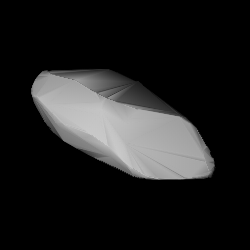
- Shape model of Magnitka from its lightcurve

Discovery
- Discovered by: Crimean Astrophysical Obs.
- Discovery site: Crimean Astrophysical Obs.
- Discovery date: 12 October 1971

Designations
- Named after: Magnitogorsk (Russian city)
- Alternative designations: 1971 TC_{2} · 1941 WK; 1951 WP · 1956 EB; 1964 TD · 1968 WE; 1977 FG
- Minor planet category: main-belt · Flora

Orbital characteristics
- Epoch 4 September 2017 (JD 2458000.5)
- Uncertainty parameter 0
- Observation arc: 75.36 yr (27,524 days)
- Aphelion: 2.4474 AU
- Perihelion: 2.0170 AU
- Semi-major axis: 2.2322 AU
- Eccentricity: 0.0964
- Orbital period (sidereal): 3.34 yr (1,218 days)
- Mean anomaly: 149.03°
- Mean motion: 0° 17^{m} 43.8^{s} / day
- Inclination: 5.0289°
- Longitude of ascending node: 281.93°
- Argument of perihelion: 251.58°

Physical characteristics
- Mean diameter: 9.91±0.58 km 10.121±0.408 km 12.053±0.055 km 12.167 km 12.17 km (taken); 12.58±1.04 km 12.69±1.1 km
- Synodic rotation period: 6.11±0.02 h 6.1124±0.0002 h (Note: Pravec (2006): Observed on 26 January 2006; rotation period of 6.1124±0.0002 hours; brightness amplitude of 0.86 magnitude; no quality code assessment. Summary figures for (2094) Magnitka at Light Curve Database); 6.24±0.01 h
- Geometric albedo: 0.120; 0.1278±0.0129; 0.132±0.025; 0.1739±0.035; 0.194±0.042; 0.285±0.036
- Spectral type: S
- Absolute magnitude (H): 11.90 · 12.0±0.2 (R) · 12.0 · 12.1 · 12.45 · 12.49±0.206 · 12.49

2094 Magnitka (prov. designation: 1971 TC_{2}) is a Flora asteroid from the inner regions of the asteroid belt, approximately 12 kilometers (7.5 miles) in diameter. It was discovered on 12 October 1971, at and by the Crimean Astrophysical Observatory in Nauchnyj, on the Crimean peninsula. The discovery has not been attributed to an observing astronomer. It was later named for the city of Magnitogorsk.

== Orbit and classification ==
Magnitka is a member of the Flora family, one of the largest families of stony asteroids. It orbits the Sun in the inner main-belt at a distance of 2.0–2.4 AU once every 3 years and 4 months (1,218 days). Its orbit has an eccentricity of 0.10 and an inclination of 5° with respect to the ecliptic. It was first identified as 1941 WK at the Finnish Turku Observatory, extending the body's observation arc by 30 years prior to its official discovery observation.

== Naming ==
This minor planet was named for the city of Magnitogorsk, Russia, one of the largest centers of metallurgy of the former Soviet Union. The city is located at the far-east of the Ural Mountains, about 250 kilometers southwest of the city of Chelyabinsk in the Chelyabinsk Oblast region, also known for the spectacular air-burst of the Chelyabinsk meteor in 2013. The official naming citation was published by the Minor Planet Center on 1 April 1980 (M.P.C. 5282).

== Physical characteristics ==
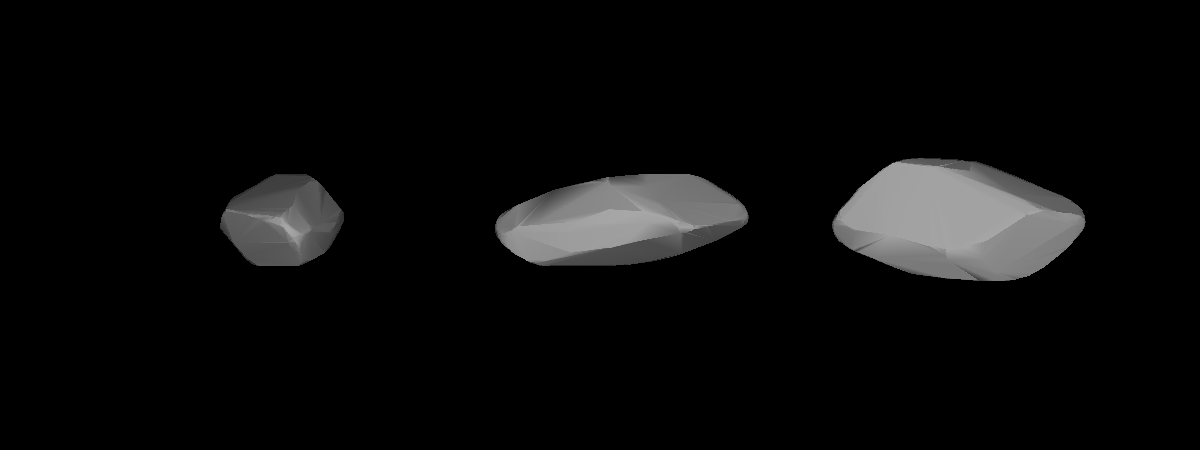
Lightcurve-based 3D-model of Magnitka

=== Lightcurves ===
In October 2006, two rotational lightcurves for Magnitka were obtained from photometric observations by Petr Pravec at Ondřejov Observatory and by John Menke at his Menke Observatory, respectively. Lightcurve analysis gave a concurring rotation period of 6.11 hours with a brightness variation of 0.80 and 0.86 magnitude (U=3-/n.a.), respectively, indicating a non-spheroidal shape for Magnitka. In March 2016, Pierre Antonini obtained a tentative lightcurve, which gave a period of 6.24 hours and an amplitude of 0.85 (U=2+).

=== Diameter and albedo ===
According to the surveys carried out by the Infrared Astronomical Satellite IRAS, the Japanese Akari satellite, and NASA's Wide-field Infrared Survey Explorer with its subsequent NEOWISE mission, the asteroid measures between 9.9 and 12.7 kilometers in diameter and its surface has an albedo between 0.132. The Collaborative Asteroid Lightcurve Link agrees with Pravec's revised thermal WISE data, taking an albedo of 0.12, and a diameter of 12.17 kilometers with an absolute magnitude of 12.49.
