= 2104 Toronto =

Main-belt asteroid

Discovery
- Discovered by: K. W. Kamper
- Discovery site: Karl Schwarzschild Obs.
- Discovery date: 15 August 1963

Designations
- Named after: University of Toronto
- Alternative designations: 1963 PD · 1955 HW
- Minor planet category: main-belt · (outer) background

Orbital characteristics
- Epoch 4 September 2017 (JD 2458000.5)
- Uncertainty parameter 0
- Observation arc: 61.93 yr (22,619 days)
- Aphelion: 3.5735 AU
- Perihelion: 2.8031 AU
- Semi-major axis: 3.1883 AU
- Eccentricity: 0.1208
- Orbital period (sidereal): 5.69 yr (2,079 days)
- Mean anomaly: 359.45°
- Mean motion: 0° 10^{m} 23.16^{s} / day
- Inclination: 18.379°
- Longitude of ascending node: 252.48°
- Argument of perihelion: 291.78°

Physical characteristics
- Dimensions: 26.96±0.60 km 35.864±0.383 km 35.874±0.503 km 37.13±0.58 km 61.04 km (calculated)
- Synodic rotation period: 8.9669±0.0002 h 8.97±0.01 h (Note: Aznar (2016) web. Observation of (2104) Toronto from November 2015: Rotation period 8.97±0.01 hours with a brightness amplitude of 0.26±0.02 mag. Quality Code of 3. Summary figures for at the LCDB)
- Geometric albedo: 0.057 (assumed); 0.099±0.004; 0.104±0.011; 0.1062±0.0280; 0.292±0.031
- Spectral type: M · C (assumed)
- Absolute magnitude (H): 9.66±0.36 · 9.80 · 10.30

2104 Toronto, provisional designation 1963 PD, is a metallic background asteroid from the outer regions of the asteroid belt, approximately 36 kilometers in diameter. It was discovered on 15 August 1963, by Karl Kamper at the David Dunlap Observatory on plates taken by Sidney van den Bergh at the Karl Schwarzschild Observatory in Tautenburg, Germany. The asteroid was named after the University of Toronto. It was the first asteroid discovered at an observatory in Canada.

== Orbit and classification ==
Toronto is a non-family asteroid from the main belt's background population. It orbits the Sun in the outer main-belt at a distance of 2.8–3.6 AU once every 5 years and 8 months (2,079 days; semi-major axis of 3.19 AU). Its orbit has an eccentricity of 0.12 and an inclination of 18° with respect to the ecliptic.

The body's observation arc begins with a precovery taken at Palomar Observatory in August 1951, or 12 years prior to its official discovery observation at Tautenburg.

== Physical characteristics ==
Toronto has been characterized as a metallic M-type asteroid by the Wide-field Infrared Survey Explorer (WISE). It is also an assumed C-type asteroid.

=== Rotation period ===
Two rotational lightcurves of Toronto have been obtained from photometric observations (U=2+/3). The consolidated lightcurve gave a rotation period of 8.97 hours with a brightness amplitude between 0.26 and 0.32 magnitude.

=== Diameter and albedo ===
According to the surveys carried out by the Japanese Akari satellite and the NEOWISE mission of NASA's WISE telescope, Toronto measures between 26.96 and 37.13 kilometers in diameter and its surface has an albedo between 0.099 and 0.292.

The Collaborative Asteroid Lightcurve Link assumes a standard albedo for carbonaceous asteroids of 0.057 and consequently calculates a much larger diameter of 61.04 kilometers based on an absolute magnitude of 9.8.

== Naming ==
This minor planet was named after the University of Toronto which was celebrating its sesquicentennial at the time of its discovery. It was the first minor planet to be discovered at an observatory in Canada (despite the fact that the credited discovery site is located in Germany). The naming also emphasized the university's central role in the development of Canadian astronomy. The official naming citation was published by the Minor Planet Center on 1 February 1979 (M.P.C. 4645).
