= 2017 Wesson =

Asteroid

Discovery
- Discovered by: M. F. Wolf
- Discovery site: Heidelberg Obs.
- Discovery date: 20 September 1903

Designations
- Named after: Mary Wesson (wife of C. M. Bardwell)
- Alternative designations: A903 SC · 1936 FA_{2} 1949 CG · 1950 LD_{1} 1970 GE · 1974 QJ_{1}
- Minor planet category: main-belt · (inner)

Orbital characteristics
- Epoch 4 September 2017 (JD 2458000.5)
- Uncertainty parameter 0
- Observation arc: 113.60 yr (41,492 days)
- Aphelion: 2.6710 AU
- Perihelion: 1.8340 AU
- Semi-major axis: 2.2525 AU
- Eccentricity: 0.1858
- Orbital period (sidereal): 3.38 yr (1,235 days)
- Mean anomaly: 290.04°
- Mean motion: 0° 17^{m} 29.4^{s} / day
- Inclination: 4.8605°
- Longitude of ascending node: 171.31°
- Argument of perihelion: 136.28°

Physical characteristics
- Dimensions: 7.223±0.156 km 7.23 km (derived)
- Synodic rotation period: 2.988 h 3.4158±0.0005 h 3.41581±0.00003 h
- Geometric albedo: 0.200±0.055
- Spectral type: S B–V = 0.887; U–B = 0.545
- Absolute magnitude (H): 12.61±0.14 · 12.78 · 13.07

2017 Wesson, provisional designation A903 SC, is a stony asteroid from the inner regions of the asteroid belt, approximately 7 kilometers in diameter. It was discovered on 20 September 1903, by German astronomer Max Wolf at Heidelberg Observatory in southern Germany. It was later named after Mary Joan Wesson Bardwell, wife of Conrad Bardwell, an associate director of the Minor Planet Center.

== Orbit and classification ==
Wesson orbits the Sun in the inner main belt at a distance of 1.8–2.7 AU, orbiting once every 3 years and 5 months (1,235 days). Its orbit has an eccentricity of 0.19 and an inclination of 5° with respect to the ecliptic.

== Physical characteristics ==
Wesson has been characterized as a stony S-type asteroid. It has a rotation period of 3.418 hours. The numerous lightcurves have a brightness variation of 0.30 to 0.60 magnitude (U=2/3-). According to the survey carried out by NASA's Wide-field Infrared Survey Explorer (WISE) with its subsequent NEOWISE mission, the asteroid measures 7.2 kilometers in diameter and its surface has an albedo of 0.200. The Collaborative Asteroid Lightcurve Link agrees with the results obtained by WISE.

== Naming ==
The asteroid was named after Mary Joan Wesson Bardwell, wife of Conrad M. Bardwell (1926–2010), after whom the minor planet 1615 Bardwell is named. He also established the identifications for this minor planet. The official naming citation was published by the Minor Planet Center on 1 April 1978 (M.P.C. 4358).
