= 2500 Alascattalo =

Main-belt asteroid

Discovery
- Discovered by: K. Reinmuth
- Discovery site: Heidelberg Obs.
- Discovery date: 2 April 1926

Designations
- Named after: Alascattalo (mythological creature)
- Alternative designations: 1926 GC · 1927 TA; 1946 FB · 1981 VD
- Minor planet category: main-belt · Flora

Orbital characteristics
- Epoch 4 September 2017 (JD 2458000.5)
- Uncertainty parameter 0
- Observation arc: 91.18 yr (33,303 days)
- Aphelion: 2.4620 AU
- Perihelion: 2.0184 AU
- Semi-major axis: 2.2402 AU
- Eccentricity: 0.0990
- Orbital period (sidereal): 3.35 yr (1,225 days)
- Mean anomaly: 78.867°
- Mean motion: 0° 17^{m} 38.4^{s} / day
- Inclination: 6.9899°
- Longitude of ascending node: 48.004°
- Argument of perihelion: 160.51°

Physical characteristics
- Dimensions: 7.481±0.132 km 7.947±0.037 km 8.19 km (calculated)
- Synodic rotation period: 2.751±0.002 h 2.754±0.007 h
- Geometric albedo: 0.2138±0.0580; 0.24 (assumed); 0.257±0.013
- Spectral type: S
- Absolute magnitude (H): 12.6 · 12.8 · 12.94±0.30

2500 Alascattalo, provisional designation 1926 GC, is a stony Flora asteroid from the inner regions of the asteroid belt, approximately 8 kilometers in diameter.

The asteroid was discovered on 2 April 1926, by German astronomer Karl Reinmuth at Heidelberg Observatory in southern Germany. It was later named for the fictional moose–walrus Alascattalo creature.

== Orbit and classification ==
Alascattalo is a member of the Flora family, one of the largest groups of stony asteroids in the main-belt. It orbits the Sun in the inner main-belt at a distance of 2.0–2.5 AU once every 3 years and 4 months (1,225 days). Its orbit has an eccentricity of 0.10 and an inclination of 7° with respect to the ecliptic. No precoveries were obtained prior to its discovery.

== Physical characteristics ==
Alascattalo has been characterized as a common, stony S-type asteroid.

=== Rotation period ===
A rotational lightcurve of this asteroid was obtained from photometric observations made by Junda Liu at the Lvye Observatory (P34), China, and at the iTelescope Observatory (Q62), at the Siding Spring Observatory site, Australia, in December 2015. The lightcurve gave a well-defined rotation period of 2.751 hours with a brightness variation of 0.19 in magnitude (U=3-).

A previous lightcurve with a concurring period of 2.754 hours and a similar amplitude of 0.15 was already obtained by French amateur astronomer Pierre Antonini in March 2013 (U=2).

=== Diameter and albedo ===
According to the survey carried out by the NEOWISE mission of NASA's space-based Wide-field Infrared Survey Explorer, Alascattalo measures 7.5 and 7.9 kilometers in diameter and its surface has an albedo of 0.21 and 0.27, respectively, while the Collaborative Asteroid Lightcurve Link assumes an albedo of 0.24 – which derives from 8 Flora, the largest member and namesake of this orbital family – and calculates a diameter of 8.2 kilometers with an absolute magnitude of 12.6.

== Naming ==
This minor planet was named after the mythological creature "Alascattalo", a fictional chimera between a moose and a walrus.

According to legend, it was genetically bred by miners during the Klondike Gold Rush in the late 19th century. The alascattalo also stands for the local people's unique sense of humor, dealing with tourists who ask naive questions, and is the mascot of the four-minute long, annual parade on "Alascattalo Day" held in November. The official naming citation was published by the Minor Planet Center on 21 November 1991 (M.P.C. 19332).
