= 2014 Vasilevskis =

Asteroid

Discovery
- Discovered by: A. R. Klemola
- Discovery site: Lick Obs.
- Discovery date: 2 May 1973

Designations
- Named after: Stanislavs Vasilevskis (astronomer; staff member)
- Alternative designations: 1973 JA
- Minor planet category: main-belt · Phocaea

Orbital characteristics
- Epoch 4 September 2017 (JD 2458000.5)
- Uncertainty parameter 0
- Observation arc: 44.00 yr (16,072 days)
- Aphelion: 3.0908 AU
- Perihelion: 1.7134 AU
- Semi-major axis: 2.4021 AU
- Eccentricity: 0.2867
- Orbital period (sidereal): 3.72 yr (1,360 days)
- Mean anomaly: 295.50°
- Mean motion: 0° 15^{m} 52.92^{s} / day
- Inclination: 21.376°
- Longitude of ascending node: 204.09°
- Argument of perihelion: 82.819°

Physical characteristics
- Mean diameter: 9.044±0.043 km 9.071±0.051 km 11.84±0.81 km
- Synodic rotation period: 15.6±0.1 h 32.16±0.02 h 36.25 h 39±2 h
- Geometric albedo: 0.23 (assumed); 0.265±0.038; 0.309±0.041; 0.4513±0.1032
- Spectral type: S
- Absolute magnitude (H): 11.7 · 12.3 · 12.76±1.16

2014 Vasilevskis, provisional designation 1973 JA, is a stony Phocaean asteroid from the inner regions of the asteroid belt, approximately 10 kilometers (6.2 mi) in diameter. It was discovered on 2 May 1973, by American astronomer Arnold Klemola at the U.S. Lick Observatory on Mount Hamilton, California. It was named after Stanislavs Vasilevskis, staff member at the discovering observatory.

== Orbit and classification ==
Vasilevskis is a member of the Phocaea family (701), a group of asteroids with similar orbital characteristics, named after the family's namesake, 25 Phocaea. It orbits the Sun in the inner main-belt at a distance of 1.7–3.1 AU once every 3 years and 9 months (1,360 days). Its orbit has an eccentricity of 0.29 and an inclination of 21° with respect to the ecliptic. No precoveries were taken prior to its discovery.

== Physical characteristics ==
Vasilevskis has been characterized as a common S-type asteroid.

=== Rotation period ===
In May 2014, a photometric lightcurve analysis by American astronomer Robert Stephens at the Center for Solar System Studies (U81), California, gave a rotation period of 32.16±0.02 hours with a brightness variation of 0.26 in magnitude (U=3-).

Alternative measurements also made in 2014, include an observation by astronomer René Roy, which rendered a period of 39±2 hours with an amplitude of 0.31 in magnitude (U=2), and an analysis at the Burleith Observatory (I13), with a period of 15.6±0.1 hours, or 49% of the first period (U=2-).

=== Diameter and albedo ===
According to the space-based surveys carried out by the Japanese Akari satellite and the NEOWISE mission of NASA's Wide-field Infrared Survey Explorer, the asteroid measures between 9.1 and 11.8 kilometers in diameter, and its surface has an albedo between 0.265 and 0.451. The Collaborative Asteroid Lightcurve Link assumes an albedo 0.23 – derived from 25 Phocaea, the family's largest member and namesake – and calculates a diameter of 9.6 kilometers with an absolute magnitude of 12.3.

== Naming ==
This minor planet was named after astronomer Stanislavs Vasilevskis (died 1988), long-time staff member at the discovering Lick Observatory from 1949 to 1974.

A specialist for astrometric instrumentation, in particular the computational analysis of the position of astronomical objects from photographic plates, he has also performed broad astronomical surveys to obtain the parallax and proper motion of stars. The official naming citation was published by the Minor Planet Center on 30 June 1977 (M.P.C. 4190).
