= Valongo Observatory =

University observatory in Rio de Janeiro, Brazil

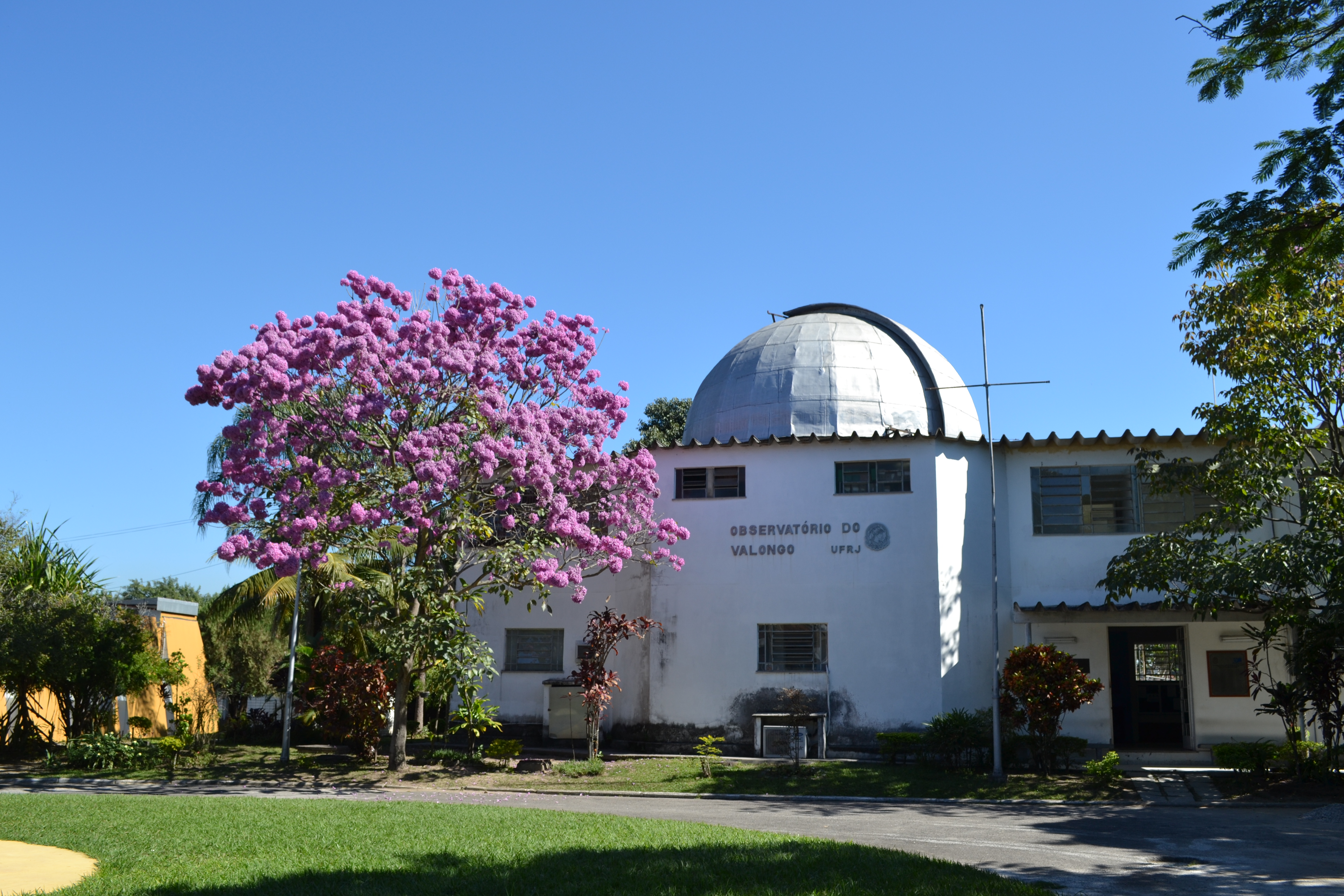
- Organization: Federal University of Rio de Janeiro
- Location: Rio de Janeiro, Brazil
- Coordinates: 22°54′S 43°11′W
- Altitude: 14 m (46 ft)
- Website: www.ov.ufrj.br

Telescopes
- Cooke: 0.42 meter Cooke & Sons refractor
- Coudé: 0.3 meter Zeiss Coudé reflector
- Pazos: 0.2 meter refractor
- Location of Valongo Observatory
- Related media on Commons

The Valongo Observatory (Observatório do Valongo) is the astronomical observatory of the Universidade Federal do Rio de Janeiro. It was established in 1881 in the downtown of Rio de Janeiro. It houses various astronomical and scientific instruments including three telescopes.

== History ==
The Valongo astronomical observatory was established in Rio de Janeiro in 1881 originally for training the students of the Rio de Janeiro Polytechnic School. In the 20th century, it was part of various universities, before it became part of the Federal University of Rio de Janeiro in the 1960s. The observatory initially housed scientific instrument used to train university students, and later engaged in scientific work.

== Instruments ==
The observatory holds various instruments and telescopes used for positional astronomy such as the measurement of astronomical objects, and tracking transient astronomical events, and astrophotography. Most of the observatory’s instruments date back to the late 19th and early 20th centuries. Among the major equipment is an equatorial refracting telescope, manufactured by Cooke & Sons, and a refractor made by Brazilian instrument maker José Hermida Pazos in 1880. It also houses a Coudé reflector telescope made by Zeiss.

Apart from the telescopes, it houses other instruments such as sextants, theodolites, prisms, diffraction gratings, spectroscopy equipment and photographic equipment. It also maintains timekeeping instruments such as chronographs, pendulum clocks, and marine chronometers for determining sidereal. Various instruments were often used in conjunction, such as telescopes paired with chronographs and micrometers for scientific use.

== See also ==
- List of astronomical observatories
