= 2754 Efimov =

Main-belt asteroid

Discovery
- Discovered by: T. Smirnova
- Discovery site: Crimean Astrophysical Obs.
- Discovery date: 13 August 1966

Designations
- Named after: Mikhail Efimov (Russian aviator)
- Alternative designations: 1966 PD · 1933 WF; 1966 RB · 1973 YR_{1}
- Minor planet category: main-belt · (inner)

Orbital characteristics
- Epoch 4 September 2017 (JD 2458000.5)
- Uncertainty parameter 0
- Observation arc: 66.15 yr (24,160 days)
- Aphelion: 2.7464 AU
- Perihelion: 1.7085 AU
- Semi-major axis: 2.2274 AU
- Eccentricity: 0.2330
- Orbital period (sidereal): 3.32 yr (1,214 days)
- Mean anomaly: 100.35°
- Mean motion: 0° 17^{m} 47.4^{s} / day
- Inclination: 5.7096°
- Longitude of ascending node: 275.17°
- Argument of perihelion: 91.098°
- Known satellites: 1

Physical characteristics
- Dimensions: 4.98 km (derived)
- Synodic rotation period: 2.44967 h (0.102070 d)
- Geometric albedo: 0.20 (assumed)
- Spectral type: SMASS = Sa · S · L
- Absolute magnitude (H): 13.6 · 13.92

2754 Efimov, provisionally named 1966 PD, is a stony asteroid and binary system from the inner regions of the asteroid belt, approximately 5 kilometers in diameter. It was discovered on 13 August 1966, by Russian astronomer Tamara Smirnova at the Crimean Astrophysical Observatory in Nauchnyj, on the Crimean peninsula. The asteroid was named after Russian aviator Mikhail Efimov.

== Orbit and classification ==
Efimov orbits the Sun in the inner main-belt at a distance of 1.7–2.7 AU once every 3 years and 4 months (1,214 days). Its orbit has an eccentricity of 0.23 and an inclination of 6° with respect to the ecliptic.

== Physical characteristics ==
In the SMASS classification, Efimov is a Sa-type asteroid, which belong to the larger group of S-type asteroids. It is also characterized as a L-type asteroid by PanSTARRS photometric survey.

The Collaborative Asteroid Lightcurve Link assumes a standard albedo for stony asteroids of 0.20 and derives a diameter of 4.98 kilometers with an absolute magnitude of 13.92.

=== Satellite ===
Efimov is a binary asteroid. In 2006, astronomers discovered a minor-planet moon around Efimov using lightcurve observations, with a diameter of 1.29 kilometers and an orbital period of 14 hours and 46 minutes.

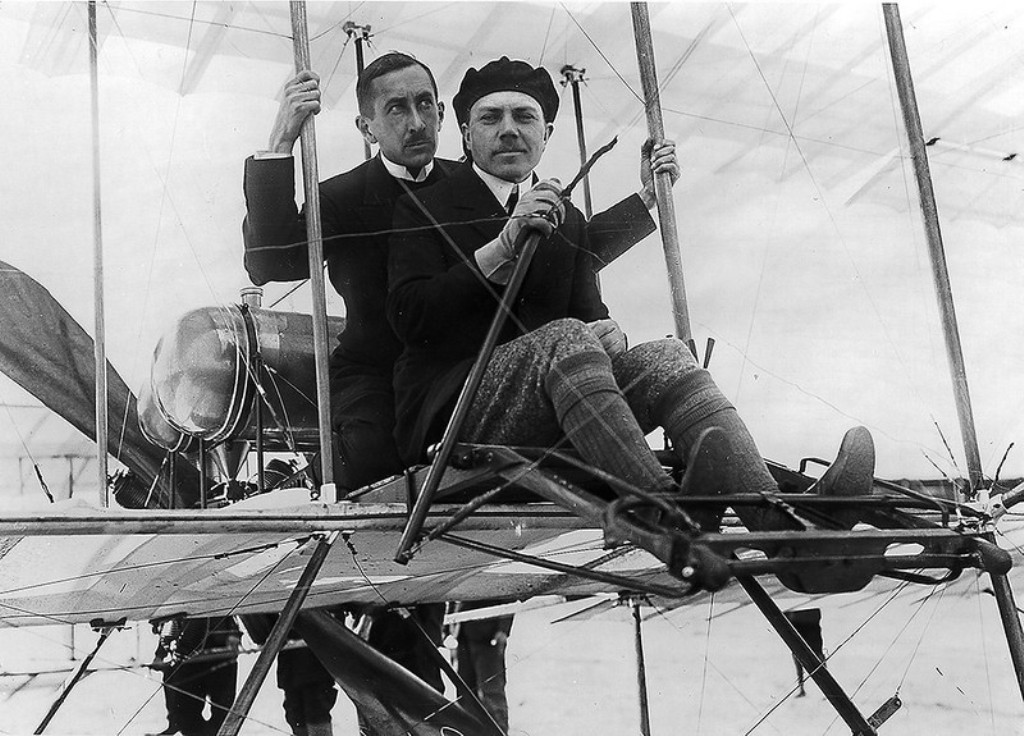
Mikhail Efimov (right) in 1910

== Naming ==
This minor planet named in memory of Russian aviator Mikhail Nikiforovich Efimov (Russian: М. Н. Ефимов; 1881–1919), who was the first to realize steep turns and dives.

The approved naming citation was published by the Minor Planet Center on 31 May 1988 (M.P.C. 13173).
