= Comet West (disambiguation) =

Comet West mostly refers to C/1975 V1, the brightest comet that appeared in the 1970s. It may also refer to any comets discovered by Danish astronomer, Richard M. West, below:

- 76P/West–Kohoutek–Ikemura
- 123P/West–Hartley
- C/1978 A1 (West)
