= Črni Vrh Observatory =

Astronomical observatory in Slovenia

Coordinates: 45°56′48″N 14°04′25″E

Minor planets discovered: 421
see § List of discovered minor planets

The Črni Vrh Observatory (Slovene: Observatorij Črni Vrh, IAU code: 106) is an astronomical observatory located in western Slovenia, close to the settlement of Črni Vrh, near the town of Idrija.

== Observatory ==
The current observatory was built in 1985 and stands at an elevation of 730 metres (2,400 ft). Much of the construction was done by volunteers.

Regular astronomical observations started in 1975, at a small observatory that was equipped with home-made instruments and was set up 4 km from the present site. At that time, the first images of Comet West were taken. The site is well above the inversion border much of winter, which allows undisturbed observations on many successive clear nights.

The observatory runs a comet and asteroid search program named PIKA after its Slovene acronym (projekt iskanja kometov in asteroidov 'comet and asteroid search project'). Since March 2003, the program has been operated on a new 60-cm, f/3.3 Cichocki telescope equipped with a Finger Lake 1k × 1k CCD detector. Telescope project funding has been covered in part by the Planetary Society Shoemaker Grant 2000 and 2010. The recent grant was for the purchase of a deep-cooling Apogee Alta U9000 CCD camera that will increase sensitivity of the imaging system, enabling discoveries of even fainter objects. The new camera has been in operation since October 2011.

Members of the Department of Physics, Astronomical Observatory, of the University of Ljubljana, used the site for observations with their 36 cm (14 in) S-C telescope from 1994 to 2009.

On 18 August 2008, the amateur astronomer Stanislav Matičič discovered the comet C/2008 Q1 (Matičič), the first comet discovered in this observatory and in Slovenia. On 16 April 2010, the student Jan Vales discovered the periodic comet designated P/2010 H2 (Vales) in a strong outburst. The Catalina Sky Survey researchers scanned the same region of the sky only 15 hours earlier and missed it.

== Telescopes ==
- 19-cm Automatic Comet Imaging Telescope
- 36-cm AIT Imaging System (no longer in use)
- 60-cm Cichocki Sky Survey Telescope
- All-Sky Camera
- Most Recent List of Discoveries

== Observing team ==
- Observers

== Discoveries ==
The Minor Planet Center credits a large number of minor planet discoveries directly to the observatory (Crni Vrh).

=== List of discovered minor planets ===
| 9674 Slovenija | 23 August 1998 | list |
| 15071 Hallerstein | 24 January 1999 | list |
| (16084) 1999 TY_{18} | 12 October 1999 | list |
| (16141) 1999 XT_{127} | 7 December 1999 | list |
| (18154) 2000 PA | 1 August 2000 | list |
| (19016) 2000 RY_{78} | 11 September 2000 | list |
| 19612 Noordung | 17 July 1999 | list |
| 19633 Rusjan | 13 September 1999 | list |
| (19781) 2000 QK_{68} | 26 August 2000 | list |
| (21693) 1999 RT_{44} | 14 September 1999 | list |
| (22030) 1999 XU_{127} | 7 December 1999 | list |
| (22108) 2000 PD | 1 August 2000 | list |
| (24197) 1999 XP_{37} | 7 December 1999 | list |
| (24322) 2000 AM_{43} | 4 January 2000 | list |
| (25317) 1999 BL_{12} | 24 January 1999 | list |
| (27174) 1999 BB_{2} | 19 January 1999 | list |
| (27561) 2000 KJ_{1} | 24 May 2000 | list |
| (29740) 1999 BS_{9} | 19 January 1999 | list |
| (29742) 1999 BQ_{12} | 24 January 1999 | list |
| (30382) 2000 JB_{81} | 15 May 2000 | list |
| (30383) 2000 KZ_{1} | 26 May 2000 | list |
| (30420) 2000 LD_{1} | 1 June 2000 | list |
| (32083) 2000 KO | 24 May 2000 | list |
| (32199) 2000 ON_{2} | 27 July 2000 | list |
| (32291) 2000 QP_{8} | 24 August 2000 | list |

| (32292) 2000 QR_{8} | 24 August 2000 | list |
| (32293) 2000 QT_{8} | 24 August 2000 | list |
| (33752) 1999 RM_{36} | 12 September 1999 | list |
| (33753) 1999 RW_{42} | 13 September 1999 | list |
| (33915) 2000 LA_{15} | 5 June 2000 | list |
| (34006) 2000 OQ_{9} | 31 July 2000 | list |
| (34078) 2000 PF | 1 August 2000 | list |
| (34087) 2000 PA_{7} | 1 August 2000 | list |
| (34437) 2000 SF_{43} | 26 September 2000 | list |
| (34607) 2000 UD_{3} | 24 October 2000 | list |
| (36357) 2000 OQ_{2} | 28 July 2000 | list |
| (36459) 2000 QU_{8} | 24 August 2000 | list |
| (36460) 2000 QA_{9} | 25 August 2000 | list |
| (36461) 2000 QC_{9} | 25 August 2000 | list |
| (36798) 2000 SA_{43} | 25 September 2000 | list |
| (36799) 2000 SG_{43} | 26 September 2000 | list |
| (38841) 2000 SH_{43} | 26 September 2000 | list |
| (40446) 1999 RN_{36} | 12 September 1999 | list |
| (40466) 1999 RU_{44} | 14 September 1999 | list |
| (40761) 1999 TT_{13} | 11 October 1999 | list |
| (40770) 1999 TV_{18} | 11 October 1999 | list |
| (42186) 2001 CH_{32} | 11 February 2001 | list |
| (43191) 1999 YM_{5} | 29 December 1999 | list |
| (44724) 1999 TU_{13} | 11 October 1999 | list |
| (45028) 1999 WD_{9} | 28 November 1999 | list |

| (45590) 2000 CU_{101} | 14 February 2000 | list |
| (45602) 2000 DX_{17} | 28 February 2000 | list |
| (46016) 2001 CP_{41} | 15 February 2001 | list |
| (46018) 2001 DX_{6} | 16 February 2001 | list |
| (46021) 2001 DZ_{14} | 17 February 2001 | list |
| (47101) 1999 BP_{12} | 24 January 1999 | list |
| (48018) 2001 CB_{36} | 15 February 2001 | list |
| (48020) 2001 DC | 16 February 2001 | list |
| (49475) 1999 BH_{3} | 19 January 1999 | list |
| (49679) 1999 TZ_{7} | 6 October 1999 | list |
| (51625) 2001 HX_{37} | 29 April 2001 | list |
| (54321) 2000 JA_{81} | 15 May 2000 | list |
| (54468) 2000 OA_{7} | 29 July 2000 | list |
| (54469) 2000 OM_{8} | 30 July 2000 | list |
| (54687) 2001 DC_{15} | 17 February 2001 | list |
| (56297) 1999 RT_{42} | 12 September 1999 | list |
| (56677) 2000 LG_{1} | 1 June 2000 | list |
| (56690) 2000 LZ_{14} | 5 June 2000 | list |
| (56746) 2000 OO_{2} | 27 July 2000 | list |
| (61060) 2000 LH_{1} | 2 June 2000 | list |
| (62028) 2000 RE_{53} | 1 September 2000 | list |
| (62072) 2000 RD_{78} | 9 September 2000 | list |
| (62073) 2000 RX_{78} | 10 September 2000 | list |
| (62747) 2000 UB_{3} | 24 October 2000 | list |
| (63375) 2001 HY_{37} | 29 April 2001 | list |

| (63376) 2001 HA_{38} | 29 April 2001 | list |
| 66667 Kambič | 8 October 1999 | list |
| (67547) 2000 SE_{43} | 26 September 2000 | list |
| (68726) 2002 EZ_{5} | 12 March 2002 | list |
| (70218) 1999 RY_{42} | 13 September 1999 | list |
| (70443) 1999 TV_{9} | 7 October 1999 | list |
| (70445) 1999 TR_{13} | 11 October 1999 | list |
| (71002) 1999 XO_{37} | 7 December 1999 | list |
| (72420) 2001 CY_{35} | 14 February 2001 | list |
| (72429) 2001 CN_{41} | 15 February 2001 | list |
| (72445) 2001 DD | 16 February 2001 | list |
| (74432) 1999 BM_{12} | 24 January 1999 | list |
| (74628) 1999 RV_{42} | 12 September 1999 | list |
| (74821) 1999 TP_{13} | 10 October 1999 | list |
| (76770) 2000 KZ_{43} | 26 May 2000 | list |
| (77043) 2001 CQ_{41} | 15 February 2001 | list |
| (77050) 2001 DB | 16 February 2001 | list |
| (78901) 2003 ST_{66} | 19 September 2003 | list |
| (80597) 2000 AD_{147} | 6 January 2000 | list |
| (81870) 2000 LB_{1} | 1 June 2000 | list |
| (81907) 2000 NR_{2} | 5 July 2000 | list |
| (84356) 2002 TG_{82} | 1 October 2002 | list |
| (84357) 2002 TH_{82} | 1 October 2002 | list |
| (84962) 2003 YM_{9} | 17 December 2003 | list |
| (84987) 2003 YK_{83} | 18 December 2003 | list |

| (85000) 2003 YA_{125} | 27 December 2003 | list |
| (86051) 1999 QB_{2} | 22 August 1999 | list |
| (86208) 1999 TD_{16} | 11 October 1999 | list |
| (87089) 2000 LF_{1} | 1 June 2000 | list |
| (87169) 2000 OP_{2} | 27 July 2000 | list |
| (87178) 2000 OZ_{6} | 28 July 2000 | list |
| (87318) 2000 QS_{8} | 24 August 2000 | list |
| (87319) 2000 QD_{9} | 25 August 2000 | list |
| (87646) 2000 RB_{78} | 8 September 2000 | list |
| (87718) 2000 SY_{42} | 25 September 2000 | list |
| (91599) 1999 TQ_{13} | 10 October 1999 | list |
| (92441) 2000 KY_{1} | 26 May 2000 | list |
| (92996) 2000 RE_{78} | 9 September 2000 | list |
| (96878) 1999 TE_{16} | 11 October 1999 | list |
| (97854) 2000 QZ_{8} | 25 August 2000 | list |
| (97941) 2000 QW_{117} | 29 August 2000 | list |
| (98138) 2000 SW_{42} | 25 September 2000 | list |
| (98397) 2000 UC_{3} | 24 October 2000 | list |
| (98954) 2001 CJ_{32} | 12 February 2001 | list |
| (98973) 2001 DB_{15} | 17 February 2001 | list |
| (99151) 2001 FP_{128} | 23 March 2001 | list |
| (99192) 2001 GD_{4} | 14 April 2001 | list |
| (102222) 1999 TA_{12} | 8 October 1999 | list |
| (102232) 1999 TX_{18} | 12 October 1999 | list |
| (103290) 2000 AN_{43} | 5 January 2000 | list |

| (105092) 2000 LC_{1} | 1 June 2000 | list |
| (105093) 2000 LE_{1} | 1 June 2000 | list |
| (106544) 2000 WJ_{68} | 27 November 2000 | list |
| (106874) 2000 YD_{33} | 23 December 2000 | list |
| (107290) 2001 CA | 1 February 2001 | list |
| (107385) 2001 CL_{41} | 15 February 2001 | list |
| (107408) 2001 DZ_{6} | 16 February 2001 | list |
| (107409) 2001 DS_{7} | 16 February 2001 | list |
| (107410) 2001 DV_{7} | 17 February 2001 | list |
| (107433) 2001 DW_{14} | 16 February 2001 | list |
| (107434) 2001 DA_{15} | 17 February 2001 | list |
| (107514) 2001 DW_{53} | 20 February 2001 | list |
| (108229) 2001 HW_{37} | 29 April 2001 | list |
| (108250) 2001 HH_{46} | 17 April 2001 | list |
| (109564) 2001 QP_{264} | 26 August 2001 | list |
| (111565) 2002 AP_{4} | 8 January 2002 | list |
| (111829) 2002 EA_{6} | 12 March 2002 | list |
| (115055) 2003 RU_{6} | 3 September 2003 | list |
| (115350) 2003 SW_{234} | 25 September 2003 | list |
| (115450) 2003 TK_{10} | 15 October 2003 | list |
| (115517) 2003 UL_{37} | 16 October 2003 | list |
| (115518) 2003 UM_{37} | 16 October 2003 | list |
| (115519) 2003 UN_{37} | 16 October 2003 | list |
| (115520) 2003 UO_{37} | 17 October 2003 | list |
| (115554) 2003 UL_{74} | 16 October 2003 | list |

| (116256) 2003 YF_{27} | 16 December 2003 | list |
| (117407) 2005 AD_{11} | 1 January 2005 | list |
| (122163) 2000 KA_{2} | 27 May 2000 | list |
| (122193) 2000 LJ_{1} | 2 June 2000 | list |
| (122210) 2000 NL_{3} | 7 July 2000 | list |
| (122274) 2000 PH_{3} | 1 August 2000 | list |
| (122309) 2000 QV_{8} | 24 August 2000 | list |
| (122726) 2000 SB_{43} | 26 September 2000 | list |
| (122727) 2000 SD_{43} | 26 September 2000 | list |
| (122728) 2000 SJ_{43} | 26 September 2000 | list |
| (123086) 2000 SH_{321} | 28 September 2000 | list |
| (123864) 2001 DV_{6} | 16 February 2001 | list |
| (126439) 2002 CP_{12} | 4 February 2002 | list |
| (126781) 2002 EA_{11} | 13 March 2002 | list |
| (130491) 2000 QT_{117} | 29 August 2000 | list |
| (130624) 2000 SC_{43} | 26 September 2000 | list |
| (131180) 2001 CR_{41} | 15 February 2001 | list |
| (133354) 2003 SX_{124} | 18 September 2003 | list |
| (133360) 2003 SH_{129} | 20 September 2003 | list |
| (133570) 2003 UK_{37} | 16 October 2003 | list |
| (133838) 2003 YH_{27} | 16 December 2003 | list |
| (138984) 2001 DY_{6} | 16 February 2001 | list |
| (138990) 2001 DV_{14} | 16 February 2001 | list |
| (143878) 2003 YG_{27} | 16 December 2003 | list |
| (145450) 2005 RM_{31} | 13 September 2005 | list |

| (146102) 2000 QB_{9} | 25 August 2000 | list |
| (147538) 2004 EF_{24} | 15 March 2004 | list |
| (149003) 2002 AB_{1} | 4 January 2002 | list |
| (150499) 2000 QV_{117} | 29 August 2000 | list |
| (151557) 2002 TM_{74} | 1 October 2002 | list |
| (153105) 2000 SZ_{42} | 25 September 2000 | list |
| (154604) 2003 QM_{29} | 23 August 2003 | list |
| (155689) 2000 LV_{2} | 4 June 2000 | list |
| (155796) 2000 UQ_{13} | 24 October 2000 | list |
| (156866) 2003 DB_{15} | 26 February 2003 | list |
| (157884) 1999 RV_{44} | 14 September 1999 | list |
| (158176) 2001 QO_{264} | 26 August 2001 | list |
| (161319) 2003 QJ_{28} | 21 August 2003 | list |
| (161377) 2003 SX_{292} | 26 September 2003 | list |
| (161389) 2003 UL_{78} | 17 October 2003 | list |
| (163190) 2002 EV_{7} | 12 March 2002 | list |
| (163192) 2002 EB_{11} | 13 March 2002 | list |
| (163775) 2003 QR_{8} | 20 August 2003 | list |
| (163883) 2003 ST_{177} | 18 September 2003 | list |
| (163923) 2003 SW_{292} | 26 September 2003 | list |
| (164281) 2004 XF_{71} | 11 December 2004 | list |
| (168268) 2007 PQ_{1} | 5 August 2007 | list |
| (168553) 1999 WF_{9} | 29 November 1999 | list |
| (168554) 1999 WS_{13} | 30 November 1999 | list |
| (168723) 2000 OR_{9} | 31 July 2000 | list |

| (170209) 2003 PN_{8} | 3 August 2003 | list |
| (170236) 2003 QP_{24} | 21 August 2003 | list |
| (170238) 2003 QS_{27} | 21 August 2003 | list |
| (170286) 2003 RT_{6} | 3 September 2003 | list |
| (170405) 2003 UK_{4} | 16 October 2003 | list |
| (170648) 2003 YA_{114} | 24 December 2003 | list |
| (170874) 2004 HS_{37} | 21 April 2004 | list |
| (171117) 2005 GF_{1} | 1 April 2005 | list |
| (171814) 2001 DS_{103} | 16 February 2001 | list |
| (173084) 2007 PO_{1} | 5 August 2007 | list |
| (175623) 2006 YR_{14} | 22 December 2006 | list |
| (176109) 2001 DA_{7} | 16 February 2001 | list |
| (177194) 2003 UZ_{16} | 17 October 2003 | list |
| (178789) 2001 DE | 16 February 2001 | list |
| (179416) 2002 AP_{14} | 9 January 2002 | list |
| (180322) 2003 YK_{2} | 17 December 2003 | list |
| (180554) 2004 EH_{24} | 15 March 2004 | list |
| (182140) 2000 SX_{42} | 25 September 2000 | list |
| (182235) 2001 DY_{14} | 17 February 2001 | list |
| (186474) 2002 TN_{58} | 1 October 2002 | list |
| (186484) 2002 TE_{109} | 1 October 2002 | list |
| (186727) 2004 CR | 9 February 2004 | list |
| (189470) 1999 TB_{8} | 7 October 1999 | list |
| (192685) 1999 TA_{8} | 7 October 1999 | list |
| (193659) 2001 DX_{53} | 20 February 2001 | list |

| (195008) 2002 CQ_{12} | 5 February 2002 | list |
| (196681) 2003 SZ_{63} | 17 September 2003 | list |
| (196710) 2003 SH_{94} | 18 September 2003 | list |
| (197396) 2003 YK_{27} | 17 December 2003 | list |
| (197451) 2003 YW_{114} | 25 December 2003 | list |
| (199809) 2007 CE_{61} | 14 February 2007 | list |
| (200057) 2008 PT_{16} | 11 August 2008 | list |
| (201592) 2003 SE_{129} | 20 September 2003 | list |
| (202852) 2008 TH_{92} | 4 October 2008 | list |
| (203199) 2001 DT_{7} | 16 February 2001 | list |
| (206372) 2003 QO_{89} | 26 August 2003 | list |
| (207756) 2007 SX_{11} | 20 September 2007 | list |
| (209159) 2003 UF_{50} | 16 October 2003 | list |
| (210323) 2007 TW_{241} | 7 October 2007 | list |
| (213250) 2001 CX_{35} | 14 February 2001 | list |
| (213468) 2002 EU_{8} | 12 March 2002 | list |
| (213859) 2003 SG_{127} | 19 September 2003 | list |
| (215777) 2004 HR_{37} | 21 April 2004 | list |
| (216442) 2009 FG_{4} | 18 March 2009 | list |
| (217756) 2000 QW_{8} | 25 August 2000 | list |
| (218986) 2008 GN_{112} | 5 April 2008 | list |
| (221935) 2009 QF_{2} | 17 August 2009 | list |
| (223481) 2003 YM_{27} | 17 December 2003 | list |
| (225012) 2007 EP_{184} | 12 March 2007 | list |
| (225247) 2009 QY_{32} | 24 August 2009 | list |

| (226508) 2003 TJ_{10} | 15 October 2003 | list |
| (227144) 2005 PG_{2} | 4 August 2005 | list |
| (227835) 2007 CM_{51} | 14 February 2007 | list |
| (228360) 2000 UA_{3} | 23 October 2000 | list |
| (230690) 2003 UX_{16} | 16 October 2003 | list |
| (232543) 2003 SF_{129} | 20 September 2003 | list |
| (232786) 2004 QT_{13} | 17 August 2004 | list |
| (233044) 2005 GF_{33} | 4 April 2005 | list |
| (233644) 2008 OZ_{6} | 29 July 2008 | list |
| (233649) 2008 PJ_{12} | 10 August 2008 | list |
| (234634) 2002 CL_{15} | 8 February 2002 | list |
| (235191) 2003 SG_{129} | 20 September 2003 | list |
| (236508) 2006 GO_{38} | 4 April 2006 | list |
| (236761) 2007 NN_{4} | 14 July 2007 | list |
| (236890) 2007 SY_{11} | 22 September 2007 | list |
| (237176) 2008 UX_{160} | 23 October 2008 | list |
| (237509) 2000 RG_{60} | 8 September 2000 | list |
| (239383) 2007 SC_{11} | 22 September 2007 | list |
| (239384) 2007 SZ_{11} | 22 September 2007 | list |
| (239777) 2010 CW_{82} | 13 February 2010 | list |
| (242234) 2003 SL_{129} | 20 September 2003 | list |
| (242932) 2006 QH_{53} | 23 August 2006 | list |
| (243065) 2007 GC_{1} | 9 April 2007 | list |
| (243148) 2007 TN_{19} | 7 October 2007 | list |
| (244705) 2003 QN_{29} | 23 August 2003 | list |

| (244728) 2003 RU_{5} | 4 September 2003 | list |
| (245521) 2005 SG_{113} | 26 September 2005 | list |
| (246089) 2007 AA_{12} | 14 January 2007 | list |
| (246828) 2009 UF_{5} | 18 October 2009 | list |
| (247757) 2003 PM_{8} | 3 August 2003 | list |
| (247761) 2003 QC_{11} | 20 August 2003 | list |
| (249616) 1999 TS_{13} | 11 October 1999 | list |
| (250300) 2003 QK_{29} | 23 August 2003 | list |
| (251311) 2006 YS_{14} | 22 December 2006 | list |
| (251312) 2006 YV_{14} | 23 December 2006 | list |
| (251341) 2007 OO_{9} | 23 July 2007 | list |
| (256515) 2007 EV_{165} | 13 March 2007 | list |
| (256570) 2007 TH_{16} | 7 October 2007 | list |
| (259405) 2003 QQ_{46} | 24 August 2003 | list |
| (259917) 2004 EJ_{24} | 15 March 2004 | list |
| (263035) 2007 GF_{4} | 12 April 2007 | list |
| (263790) 2008 PG_{22} | 10 August 2008 | list |
| (264022) 2009 QD_{2} | 16 August 2009 | list |
| (264034) 2009 QX_{39} | 24 August 2009 | list |
| (267764) 2003 QX_{30} | 23 August 2003 | list |
| (269256) 2008 QK_{43} | 26 August 2008 | list |
| (269379) 2009 OW_{3} | 21 July 2009 | list |
| (273476) 2006 YT_{14} | 22 December 2006 | list |
| (275009) 2009 UC_{3} | 17 October 2009 | list |
| (276504) 2003 QW_{67} | 24 August 2003 | list |

| (282121) 2001 DW_{6} | 16 February 2001 | list |
| (282895) 2007 GZ_{24} | 12 April 2007 | list |
| (282933) 2007 PP_{40} | 6 August 2007 | list |
| (283810) 2003 SU_{182} | 20 September 2003 | list |
| (284524) 2007 RH_{120} | 11 September 2007 | list |
| (284767) 2008 WL_{101} | 27 November 2008 | list |
| (287867) 2003 SV_{292} | 26 September 2003 | list |
| (291580) 2006 FZ_{49} | 29 March 2006 | list |
| (293153) 2006 YB_{12} | 22 December 2006 | list |
| (293602) 2007 JM_{43} | 13 May 2007 | list |
| (293641) 2007 ON_{9} | 23 July 2007 | list |
| (293943) 2007 TK_{16} | 8 October 2007 | list |
| (296285) 2009 DD_{73} | 25 February 2009 | list |
| (296524) 2009 OU_{1} | 19 July 2009 | list |
| (298364) 2003 QM_{89} | 26 August 2003 | list |
| (303154) 2004 EG_{24} | 15 March 2004 | list |
| (304080) 2006 GN_{38} | 4 April 2006 | list |
| (304187) 2006 QF_{57} | 23 August 2006 | list |
| (304793) 2007 OP_{9} | 24 July 2007 | list |
| (306681) 2000 US_{13} | 28 October 2000 | list |
| (307166) 2002 EY_{5} | 11 March 2002 | list |
| (307600) 2003 QO_{23} | 20 August 2003 | list |
| (308854) 2006 RG_{102} | 1 September 2006 | list |
| (309204) 2007 GF_{25} | 12 April 2007 | list |
| (309228) 2007 QM_{1} | 16 August 2007 | list |

| (311705) 2006 SB_{198} | 27 September 2006 | list |
| (311971) 2007 EF_{39} | 11 March 2007 | list |
| (312337) 2008 CQ_{184} | 11 February 2008 | list |
| (313648) 2003 SW_{124} | 18 September 2003 | list |
| (321373) 2009 OK_{8} | 29 July 2009 | list |
| (328358) 2008 OE_{3} | 28 July 2008 | list |
| (328360) 2008 OL_{4} | 28 July 2008 | list |
| (328407) 2008 SH_{61} | 20 September 2008 | list |
| (328641) 2009 SG_{215} | 23 September 2009 | list |
| (328658) 2009 SR_{255} | 23 September 2009 | list |
| (330512) 2007 NO_{4} | 15 July 2007 | list |
| (330773) 2008 TR_{3} | 4 October 2008 | list |
| (330855) 2009 QH_{1} | 16 August 2009 | list |
| (332538) 2008 PJ_{17} | 10 August 2008 | list |
| (332691) 2009 QP_{7} | 18 August 2009 | list |
| (336406) 2008 UA_{161} | 24 October 2008 | list |
| (337325) 2001 DF | 16 February 2001 | list |
| (338512) 2003 QL_{29} | 23 August 2003 | list |
| (338598) 2003 SZ_{165} | 20 September 2003 | list |
| (340714) 2006 SQ_{57} | 20 September 2006 | list |
| (341630) 2007 VD_{10} | 1 November 2007 | list |
| (341832) 2008 CP_{72} | 9 February 2008 | list |
| (341931) 2008 NH_{3} | 10 July 2008 | list |
| (342773) 2008 WM_{101} | 27 November 2008 | list |
| (343461) 2010 EG_{44} | 13 March 2010 | list |

| (347027) 2010 EJ_{44} | 13 March 2010 | list |
| (347038) 2010 EF_{104} | 7 March 2010 | list |
| (347080) 2010 GM_{32} | 8 April 2010 | list |
| (347958) 2003 QL_{89} | 26 August 2003 | list |
| (348096) 2003 XH_{18} | 14 December 2003 | list |
| (352210) 2007 SB_{12} | 22 September 2007 | list |
| (352632) 2008 FJ_{122} | 30 March 2008 | list |
| (353286) 2010 GM_{75} | 8 April 2010 | list |
| (355026) 2006 QE_{169} | 31 August 2006 | list |
| (356203) 2009 QX_{32} | 24 August 2009 | list |
| (358174) 2006 SR_{57} | 20 September 2006 | list |
| (359170) 2009 CN_{5} | 13 February 2009 | list |
| (362266) 2009 PN_{5} | 15 August 2009 | list |
| (362267) 2009 PO_{5} | 15 August 2009 | list |
| (363410) 2003 QW_{28} | 22 August 2003 | list |
| (363411) 2003 QR_{46} | 24 August 2003 | list |
| (363506) 2003 UJ_{37} | 16 October 2003 | list |
| (365015) 2008 OY_{6} | 29 July 2008 | list |
| (365267) 2009 QG_{11} | 20 August 2009 | list |
| (365309) 2009 SR_{20} | 21 September 2009 | list |
| (365598) 2010 TL_{170} | 12 October 2010 | list |
| (366635) 2003 SG_{122} | 17 September 2003 | list |
| (366720) 2003 YL_{27} | 17 December 2003 | list |
| (367514) 2009 OQ_{5} | 24 July 2009 | list |
| (369226) 2008 UW_{160} | 23 October 2008 | list |

| (369273) 2009 QO_{7} | 18 August 2009 | list |
| (369282) 2009 QU_{57} | 27 August 2009 | list |
| (370178) 2002 CO_{12} | 4 February 2002 | list |
| (371740) 2007 EL_{171} | 13 March 2007 | list |
| (371792) 2007 PP_{1} | 5 August 2007 | list |
| (372751) 2010 BZ_{2} | 19 January 2010 | list |
| (375113) 2007 TF_{284} | 11 September 2007 | list |
| (375300) 2008 PN_{16} | 28 July 2008 | list |
| (375301) 2008 PS_{16} | 11 August 2008 | list |
| (376052) 2010 EH_{44} | 13 March 2010 | list |
| (379098) 2008 YV_{5} | 21 December 2008 | list |
| (380432) 2003 QP_{79} | 26 August 2003 | list |
| (381772) 2009 SK_{326} | 29 September 2009 | list |
| (382657) 2002 TD_{9} | 1 October 2002 | list |
| (383584) 2007 GD_{1} | 9 April 2007 | list |
| (383856) 2008 PH_{12} | 10 August 2008 | list |
| (384109) 2008 WS_{93} | 26 November 2008 | list |
| (386790) 2010 EZ_{69} | 13 March 2010 | list |
| (392356) 2010 GN_{32} | 8 April 2010 | list |
| (395260) 2010 QA_{6} | 17 August 2010 | list |
| (398112) 2009 TR_{31} | 15 October 2009 | list |
| (400633) 2009 DD_{131} | 25 February 2009 | list |
| (402024) 2003 SB_{88} | 17 September 2003 | list |
| (406245) 2007 DP_{13} | 16 February 2007 | list |
| (406260) 2007 DS_{116} | 17 February 2007 | list |

| (406393) 2007 TQ_{19} | 7 October 2007 | list |
| (410136) 2007 HU_{4} | 17 April 2007 | list |
| (414291) 2008 PF_{22} | 10 August 2008 | list |
| (414297) 2008 QY_{45} | 26 August 2008 | list |
| (417947) 2007 TJ_{16} | 7 October 2007 | list |
| (418217) 2008 CO_{166} | 10 February 2008 | list |
| (418720) 2008 UT_{87} | 24 October 2008 | list |
| (419423) 2010 BA_{3} | 19 January 2010 | list |
| (428707) 2008 QZ_{45} | 26 August 2008 | list |
| (430633) 2003 QH_{90} | 26 August 2003 | list |
| (431406) 2007 GP_{51} | 13 April 2007 | list |
| (435164) 2007 OQ_{1} | 18 July 2007 | list |
| (435548) 2008 QT_{3} | 24 August 2008 | list |
| (438874) 2009 HY_{71} | 25 April 2009 | list |
| (445370) 2010 PS_{10} | 7 August 2010 | list |
| (457732) 2009 GT_{3} | 15 April 2009 | list |
| (462821) 2010 RH_{167} | 2 September 2010 | list |
| (465421) 2008 PF | 1 August 2008 | list |
| (467509) 2007 CW_{50} | 13 February 2007 | list |
| (467529) 2007 PU_{30} | 15 August 2007 | list |
| (475889) 2007 DR_{4} | 16 February 2007 | list |

== See also ==
- List of minor planet discoverers § Crni Vrh
