= 122P/de Vico =

Halley-type comet

Discovery
- Discovered by: Francesco de Vico
- Discovery date: 20 February 1846

Designations
- MPC designation: P/1846 D1; P/1995 S1
- Alternative designations: 1846 IV

Orbital characteristics
- Epoch: 10 October 1995 (JD 2450000.5)
- Observation arc: 150–605 years
- Earliest precovery date: 23 May 1391?
- Number of observations: 441
- Aphelion: 34.7 AU
- Perihelion: 0.659 AU
- Semi-major axis: 17.68 AU
- Eccentricity: 0.9627
- Orbital period: 74.36 years
- Inclination: 85.39°
- Longitude of ascending node: 79.62°
- Argument of periapsis: 12.98°
- Mean anomaly: 0.053°
- Last perihelion: 6 October 1995
- Next perihelion: 14 October 2069 (JPL+Nakano); 21 October 2069 (Kinoshita+Yoshida)
- T_{Jupiter}: 0.375
- Earth MOID: 0.317 AU

Physical characteristics
- Comet total magnitude (M1): 7.5
- Apparent magnitude: 5.1 (1995 apparition)

122P/de Vico is a Halley-type comet with an orbital period of 74 years. It was discovered by Francesco de Vico in Rome on 20 February 1846. It is expected to return to its next perihelion by October 2069.

== Observational history ==
=== Discovery and loss ===
During the 1846 apparition the comet reached a magnitude of 5 in mid March and was last observed in May. Its orbit was found to be elliptical and orbital calculations indicated that it would return between 1919 and 1925; however, the comet was not detected then. Despite the lack of observations, Comet de Vico was expected to return by 1995 or 1996 based on available orbital calculations at the time.

=== Recovery ===
An apparently new comet was spotted on 17 September 1995 by the Japanese astronomers Yuji Nakamura, Masaaki Tanaka, and Shougo Utsunomiya, when it had an apparent magnitude of 7, while it was discovered independently within 24 hours by Tsutomu Seki and Don Machholz. After its orbit was calculated, Brian G. Marsden, Gareth V. Williams and other astronomers have identified the comet as the rediscovery of the previously lost comet that Francesco de Vico first observed in 1846.

By the end of September the comet had a magnitude of 5.5 and was visible by naked eye. It continued to brighten in the start of October, reaching a magnitude of 5.1 before starting to fade gradually. Its tail was reported to be up to seven degrees long. The comet was also observed by Ulysses spacecraft. It was last detected on 25 June 1996.

== Orbit ==
Comet 122P/de Vico completes a single orbit once every 74 years or so, which is inclined to the ecliptic by 85 degrees. Its closest approach to the Sun is about 0.66 AU (99 million km) on every perihelion. The comet's minimum orbit intersection distance (MOID) to Earth is approximately 0.317 AU (47.4 million km).

Daniel Kirkwood in 1884 noticed that the comet shares elements with comet 12P/Pons–Brooks. He suggested that 122P had calved off Pons–Brooks some centuries prior. Later he identified the two comets' capture into their elliptical orbits (or their parent body's capture) with their shared aphelion close to Neptune in 991 CE. In 1979, Ichiro Hasegawa tentatively identified a comet observed in May 1391 as a previous apparition of 122P.

122P/de Vico's next perihelion is predicted to occur around 14–21 October 2069. It will pass about 0.8 AU (120 million km) from Earth.

On 30 December 2153, the comet will pass about 0.694 AU (103.8 million km) from Uranus.

== Physical characteristics ==
=== Chemical composition ===
Spectroscopic observations taken from the McDonald Observatory in October 1995 has allowed the detection of various chemicals outgassing from the comet while it was 0.66 AU (99 million km) from the Sun. Emission lines of carbon (C_{2} and C_{3}), cyanogen (CN), hydrocarbon (CH), and amide (NH_{2}) molecules were detected. In addition, traces of carbon disulfide (CS_{2}) molecules were also detected in the ultraviolet and visible spectra, however nitrogen (N^{+}_{2}) ions were noticeably not present in its coma. Spectroscopic measurements obtained from McDonald Observatory showed that its N_{14}/N_{15} ratio (alongside that of 153P/Ikeya–Zhang) were approximately half the value to that of the Earth's atmosphere, noticeably different to those obtained from C/1995 O1 (Hale–Bopp) and C/2000 WM_{1} (LINEAR), suggesting the existence of an unknown parent compound for the cyanogen (CN) commonly detected from comets.

An independent spectroscopic observation from the Bisei Astronomical Observatory has determined that 122P/de Vico is one of the most gas-rich comets ever known. Although its chemical composition is roughly similar to 1P/Halley (including its observed two-way rotational temperature of detected carbon molecules), its gas-to-dust ratio is 10 times higher, which is comparable to that of 23P/Brorsen–Metcalf.

=== Potential meteor shower ===
Analysis of data from Ulysses and the Pioneer Venus Orbiter detected distortions on the interplanetary magnetic field that were consistent with the crossing of Venus into a dense dust trail associated with 122P/de Vico, potentially even producing meteor showers on the planet itself.

Numbered comets
Previous; 121P/Shoemaker–Holt	122P/de Vico	Next; 123P/West–Hartley
