= La Silla =

La Silla may refer to:

- La Silla Observatory, an astronomical observatory in Chile
- Cerro de la Silla, a mountain and natural monument located within the metropolitan area of the city of Monterrey, Nuevo León, in northeastern Mexico.
- La Silla Awards, the awards granted by the Asociación Dominicana de Profesionales de la Industria del Cine
- 2187 La Silla, a stony Eunomia asteroid from the middle region of the asteroid belt
