= Richard Martin West =

Danish astronomer (born 1941)

Minor planets discovered: 40
see § List of discovered minor planets

Richard Martin West (born 1941) is a Danish astronomer and discoverer of astronomical objects with a long career at the European Southern Observatory (ESO) and at the International Astronomical Union (IAU).

He discovered numerous comets, including Comet West (C/1975 V1), which was one of the brightest comets of the 1970s, and the periodic comets 76P/West–Kohoutek–Ikemura and 123P/West–Hartley.

He is also credited by the Minor Planet Center with the discovery of 40 minor planets between 1976 and 1986, including 2146 Stentor and 2148 Epeios, two Trojan asteroids. Together with Hans-Emil Schuster, he co-discovered the Phoenix Dwarf galaxy.

== Early life and education ==
West was born in Copenhagen in 1941. He completed high school in 1959 and then achieved a degree in astronomy and astrophysics from University of Copenhagen in 1964.

== Career at ESO ==
Richard West began working at ESO in 1970, when he joined as Assistant Astronomer to the ESO Director General, Adriaan Blaauw. His career took a leap in 1972, when he charged one of the first and largest scientific programmes of ESO: the Sky Atlas Laboratory project to systematically map the southern hemisphere.

West was a leading figure in helping out and establishing serious collaborations with the scientific communities of the Central and Eastern European countries in the wake of the political, social and economical turmoil following the collapse and dismantling of the Soviet bloc in the early 1990s.

West retired in 2005, after a continuous employment at ESO.

== Positions ==
Richard West focussed a lot of his worklife on the organizational matters of the international scientific community in addition to science communications in general. He held a number of influential positions:

- Assistant General Secretary of the IAU in 1979–1982.
- General Secretary of the IAU (1982–1985).
- Presided over a number of IAU Commissions, including Commission 20 from 1988 to 1991.
- Member of the Executive Committee of ICSU.

== Awards and honors ==
- Rosenkjaer Prize. A prestigious award in Denmark, given for outstanding science or culture communication.
- The main-belt asteroid 2022 West was named in his honor.

== List of discovered minor planets ==
2052 Tamriko	24 October 1976	list
2053 Nuki	24 October 1976	list
2115 Irakli	24 October 1976	list
2116 Mtskheta	24 October 1976	list
2117 Danmark	9 January 1978	list
2145 Blaauw	24 October 1976	list
2146 Stentor	24 October 1976	list
2147 Kharadze	25 October 1976	list
2148 Epeios	24 October 1976	list
2187 La Silla	24 October 1976	list

2526 Alisary	19 May 1979	list
2595 Gudiachvili	19 May 1979	list
2596 Vainu Bappu	19 May 1979	list
2935 Naerum	24 October 1976	list
3004 Knud	27 February 1976	list
3477 Kazbegi	19 May 1979	list
3871 Reiz	18 February 1982	list
3933 Portugal	12 March 1986	list
5270 Kakabadze	19 May 1979	list
5890 Carlsberg	19 May 1979	list

6362 Tunis	19 May 1979	list
8066 Poldimeri	6 August 1980	list
8993 Ingstad	30 October 1980	list
9272 Liseleje	19 May 1979	list
10462 Saxogrammaticus	19 May 1979	list
10668 Plansos	24 October 1976	list
11005 Waldtrudering	6 August 1980	list
12188 Kalaallitnunaat	9 August 1978	list
(12198) 1980 PJ_{1}	6 August 1980	list
(14350) 1985 VA_{1}	1 November 1985	list

(15201) 1976 UY	31 October 1976	list
(15207) 1979 KD	19 May 1979	list
(20995) 1985 VY	1 November 1985	list
(22252) 1978 SG	27 September 1978	list
(26081) 1980 PT_{1}	6 August 1980	list
(27667) 1979 KJ	19 May 1979	list
(34998) 1978 SE	27 September 1978	list
(65661) 1985 VB_{1}	1 November 1985	list
79086 Gorgasali	4 September 1977	list
(187746) 1976 DC	27 February 1976	list
