= 2022 West =

Main-belt asteroid

Discovery
- Discovered by: K. Reinmuth
- Discovery site: Heidelberg Obs.
- Discovery date: 7 February 1938

Designations
- Named after: Richard M. West (Danish astronomer)
- Alternative designations: 1938 CK · 1949 TA; 1973 AP
- Minor planet category: main-belt · (middle)

Orbital characteristics
- Epoch 4 September 2017 (JD 2458000.5)
- Uncertainty parameter 0
- Observation arc: 79.12 yr (28,897 days)
- Aphelion: 3.0268 AU
- Perihelion: 2.3840 AU
- Semi-major axis: 2.7054 AU
- Eccentricity: 0.1188
- Orbital period (sidereal): 4.45 yr (1,625 days)
- Mean anomaly: 61.733°
- Mean motion: 0° 13^{m} 17.4^{s} / day
- Inclination: 5.6594°
- Longitude of ascending node: 2.5076°
- Argument of perihelion: 37.063°

Physical characteristics
- Dimensions: 11.04±0.83 km 12.634±0.341 km 12.916±0.133 km 26.64 km (calculated)
- Synodic rotation period: 14.14±0.01 h
- Geometric albedo: 0.057 (assumed); 0.1682±0.0207; 0.175±0.043; 0.230±0.036
- Spectral type: SMASS = S · C
- Absolute magnitude (H): 11.6 · 11.63±0.05 · 11.70±0.19 · 12.0

2022 West, provisional designation 1938 CK, is a stony asteroid from the middle regions of the asteroid belt, approximately 12 kilometers in diameter. It was discovered by German astronomer Karl Reinmuth at Heidelberg Observatory on 7 February 1938. The asteroid was named after Danish astronomer Richard M. West.

== Classification and orbit ==
West orbits the Sun in the central main-belt at a distance of 2.4–3.0 AU once every 4 years and 5 months (1,625 days). Its orbit has an eccentricity of 0.12 and an inclination of 6° with respect to the ecliptic. The asteroid observation arc begins at Heidelberg one month after its official discovery observation in March 1938.

== Physical characteristics ==
In the SMASS classification, West is a common S-type asteroid.

=== Lightcurves ===
In November 2016, a first rotational lightcurve of West was obtained from photometric observations by Italian astronomers. Lightcurve analysis gave a rotation period of 14.14 hours with a brightness variation of 0.50 magnitude (U=3-).

=== Diameter ===
According to the surveys carried out by the Japanese Akari satellite and the NEOWISE mission of NASA's Wide-field Infrared Survey Explorer, West measures between 11.04 and 12.916 kilometers in diameter and its surface has an albedo between 0.1682 and 0.23.

The Collaborative Asteroid Lightcurve Link assumes a standard albedo for carbonaceous asteroids of 0.057 and consequently calculates a much larger diameter of 26.64 kilometers using an absolute magnitude of 11.6.

== Naming ==
This minor planet was named after Danish astronomer Richard Martin West (born 1941), an observer and discoverer of minor planets at the European Southern Observatory in La Silla. West also discovered 76P/West–Kohoutek–Ikemura, a bright comet of the Jupiter family. He also was the International Astronomical Union's general secretary (1982–1985) and president of its Commission XX (1988–1991). The official naming citation was published by the Minor Planet Center on 1 April 1978 (M.P.C. 4359).
