= 2145 Blaauw =

Main-belt asteroid

Discovery
- Discovered by: R. M. West
- Discovery site: La Silla Obs.
- Discovery date: 24 October 1976

Designations
- Named after: Adriaan Blaauw (Dutch astronomer)
- Alternative designations: 1976 UF · 1929 XS; 1963 RK · 1980 TW
- Minor planet category: main-belt · (outer); Ursula

Orbital characteristics
- Epoch 4 September 2017 (JD 2458000.5)
- Uncertainty parameter 0
- Observation arc: 41.02 yr (14,983 days)
- Aphelion: 3.5269 AU
- Perihelion: 2.9059 AU
- Semi-major axis: 3.2164 AU
- Eccentricity: 0.0965
- Orbital period (sidereal): 5.77 yr (2,107 days)
- Mean anomaly: 314.16°
- Mean motion: 0° 10^{m} 15.24^{s} / day
- Inclination: 15.013°
- Longitude of ascending node: 264.34°
- Argument of perihelion: 279.04°

Physical characteristics
- Dimensions: 34.06 km (derived); 37.11±0.53 km 38.00±10.68 km 40.549±0.848 km 40.55±0.85 km
- Synodic rotation period: 12.141±0.003 h
- Geometric albedo: 0.051±0.011; 0.06±0.04; 0.0665 (derived); 0.076±0.002
- Spectral type: C (assumed)
- Absolute magnitude (H): 10.60 · 10.80 · 10.83±0.34 · 10.9

2145 Blaauw, provisional designation 1976 UF, is a dark Ursula asteroid from the outer regions of the asteroid belt, approximately 38 kilometers in diameter. It was discovered on 24 October 1976, by astronomer Richard Martin West at the La Silla Observatory in northern Chile. The asteroid was named after Dutch astronomer Adriaan Blaauw.

== Orbit and classification ==
Blaauw is a member of the Ursula family (631), a large family of C- and X-type asteroids, named after its parent body, 375 Ursula. It orbits the Sun in the outer asteroid belt at a distance of 2.9–3.5 AU once every 5 years and 9 months (2,107 days; semi-major axis of 3.22 AU). Its orbit has an eccentricity of 0.10 and an inclination of 15° with respect to the ecliptic.

The asteroid was first identified as 1929 XS at Lowell Observatory in December 1929. The body's observation arc begins with its identification as 1963 RK at the Karl Schwarzschild Observatory in September 1963, or 13 years prior to its official discovery observation at La Silla.

== Physical characteristics ==
Blaauw is an assumed, carbonaceous C-type asteroid.

=== Rotation period ===
Photometric measurements made from the Oakley Southern Sky Observatory during 2012 gave a lightcurve with a period of 12.141 ± 0.003 hours and a variation in brightness of 0.18 ± 0.03 in magnitude (U=2+).

=== Diameter and albedo ===
According to the surveys carried out by the Japanese Akari satellite and the NEOWISE mission of NASA's Wide-field Infrared Survey Explorer, Blaauw measures between 37.11 and 40.55 kilometers in diameter and its surface has an albedo between 0.051 and 0.076.

The Collaborative Asteroid Lightcurve Link derives an albedo of 0.0665 and a diameter of 34.06 kilometers based on an absolute magnitude of 10.9.

== Naming ==
This minor planet was named after Dutch astronomer Adriaan Blaauw (1914–2010), who was director of the European Southern Observatory (1970–74), president of the International Astronomical Union (1976–79) and professor at the Leiden Observatory (1975–1981). His study included the structure of the Milky Way and stellar kinematics and associations. The official naming citation was published by the Minor Planet Center on 1 July 1979 (M.P.C. 4788).
