= 2052 Tamriko =

Main-belt asteroid

Discovery
- Discovered by: R. M. West
- Discovery site: La Silla Obs.
- Discovery date: 24 October 1976

Designations
- Named after: Tamara West (discoverer's wife)
- Alternative designations: 1976 UN · 1928 TD; 1939 YA · 1942 JE; 1949 UV · 1951 CP_{1} 1952 FL · 1952 HL_{2} 1954 TS · 1975 WB_{2} A902 UB
- Minor planet category: main-belt · (outer); Eos

Orbital characteristics
- Epoch 4 September 2017 (JD 2458000.5)
- Uncertainty parameter 0
- Observation arc: 114.10 yr (41,676 days)
- Aphelion: 3.2627 AU
- Perihelion: 2.7529 AU
- Semi-major axis: 3.0078 AU
- Eccentricity: 0.0848
- Orbital period (sidereal): 5.22 yr (1,905 days)
- Mean anomaly: 340.25°
- Mean motion: 0° 11^{m} 20.04^{s} / day
- Inclination: 9.5008°
- Longitude of ascending node: 213.86°
- Argument of perihelion: 204.82°

Physical characteristics
- Dimensions: 26.799±0.156 km 27.51±0.50 km 27.574±0.238 km 29.11±5.31 km 30.45±2.2 km (IRAS:3)
- Synodic rotation period: 7.462±0.003 h 7.470±0.002 h (Note: lightcurve plot of (2052) Tamriko, with a rotation period 7.470 hours and a brightness amplitude of 0.15 magnitude. Observation by Brian Warner, Palmer Divide Observatory (2011).); 7.4702±0.0004 h 7.471±0.001 h
- Geometric albedo: 0.1225±0.020 (IRAS:3); 0.144±0.190; 0.150±0.006; 0.1508±0.0467; 0.158±0.025
- Spectral type: Tholen = S · S B–V = 0.825; U–B = 0.433
- Absolute magnitude (H): 10.40 · 10.48 · 10.57±0.18

2052 Tamriko, provisional designation 1976 UN, is a stony Eoan asteroid from the outer regions of the asteroid belt, approximately 27 kilometers in diameter. It was discovered on 24 October 1976, by Richard Martin West at ESO's La Silla Observatory in northern Chile. The asteroid was named after the discoverer's wife Tamara West.

== Orbit and classification ==
Tamriko is a member of the Eos family (606), the largest asteroid family in the outer main belt consisting of nearly 10,000 asteroids. It orbits the Sun in the outer main-belt at a distance of 2.8–3.3 AU once every 5 years and 3 months (1,905 days). Its orbit has an eccentricity of 0.08 and an inclination of 10° with respect to the ecliptic.

The asteroid was first identified as A902 UB at Heidelberg Observatory in October 1902. Its observation arc begins 24 years prior to the official discovery observation, with its identification 1952 FL at Goethe Link Observatory in March 1952.

== Physical characteristics ==
In the Tholen classification, Tamriko is a stony S-type asteroid.

=== Rotation period ===
Between 2001 and 2011, four rotational lightcurve of Tamriko were obtained from photometric observations by Edwin Sheridan, Pierre Antonini, Laurent Bernasconi and Brian Warner. Lightcurve analysis gave a rotation period between 7.462 and 7.471 hours with a brightness variation between 0.11 and 0.15 magnitude (U=2/2/2/2).

=== Diameter and albedo ===
According to the surveys carried out by the Infrared Astronomical Satellite IRAS, the Japanese Akari satellite, and NASA's Wide-field Infrared Survey Explorer with its subsequent NEOWISE mission, Tamriko measures between 26.799 and 30.45 kilometers in diameter and its surface has an albedo between 0.1225 and 0.158.

The Collaborative Asteroid Lightcurve Link adopts the results obtained by IRAS, that is, a standard albedo of 0.1225 and a diameter of 30.45 kilometers with an absolute magnitude of 10.48.

== Naming ==
This minor planet was named for Tamara West, wife of the discoverer Richard Martin West. The official naming citation was published by the Minor Planet Center on 1 July 1979 (M.P.C. 4786).
