= 2187 La Silla =

Asteroid

Discovery
- Discovered by: R. M. West
- Discovery site: La Silla Obs.
- Discovery date: 24 October 1976

Designations
- Named after: La Silla Observatory (observatory and mountain)
- Alternative designations: 1976 UH
- Minor planet category: main-belt · Eunomia

Orbital characteristics
- Epoch 4 September 2017 (JD 2458000.5)
- Uncertainty parameter 0
- Observation arc: 40.42 yr (14,764 days)
- Aphelion: 2.8354 AU
- Perihelion: 2.2352 AU
- Semi-major axis: 2.5353 AU
- Eccentricity: 0.1184
- Orbital period (sidereal): 4.04 yr (1,474 days)
- Mean anomaly: 139.36°
- Mean motion: 0° 14^{m} 39.12^{s} / day
- Inclination: 13.261°
- Longitude of ascending node: 137.27°
- Argument of perihelion: 214.21°

Physical characteristics
- Dimensions: 6.64 km (calculated); 12.320±0.093 km 12.96±0.70 km
- Synodic rotation period: 11.8431±0.0049 h 16 h
- Geometric albedo: 0.054±0.004; 0.080±0.010; 0.21 (assumed)
- Spectral type: S
- Absolute magnitude (H): 13.00 · 13.2 · 13.21±0.38 · 13.307±0.005 (R)

2187 La Silla, provisionally designated 1976 UH, is a stony Eunomia asteroid from the middle region of the asteroid belt, approximately 12 kilometers in diameter.

It was discovered on 24 October 1976 by Danish astronomer Richard Martin West at ESO's La Silla site in northern Chile, and named after the discovering observatory and the mountain it is located on.

== Classification and orbit ==
La Silla is a member of the Eunomia family, a large collisional group of S-type asteroids and the most prominent family in the intermediate main-belt. It orbits the Sun in the central main-belt at a distance of 2.2–2.8 AU once every 4.04 years (1,474 days). Its orbit has an eccentricity of 0.12 and an inclination of 13° with respect to the ecliptic. La Silla's observation arc begins with its discovery observation in 1976, as no precoveries were taken, and no previous identifications were made.

== Physical characteristics ==
In July 2007, French amateur astronomer René Roy obtained a rotational lightcurve from photometric observations, giving a rotation period of 16 hours with a brightness variation of 0.6 magnitude (U=2-). In March 2010, photometric observations at the Palomar Transient Factory gave a shorter period of 11.843 hours with an amplitude of 0.35 magnitude (U=2).

According to the space-based survey carried out by the Japanese Akari satellite and NASA's Wide-field Infrared Survey Explorer with its subsequent NEOWISE mission, La Silla measures 12.32 and 12.96 kilometers in diameter, and its surface has an albedo of 0.054 and 0.08, respectively. The Collaborative Asteroid Lightcurve Link assumes an albedo of 0.21 – derived from 15 Eunomia, the family's largest member and namesake – and calculates a diameter of 6.64 kilometers.

== Naming ==
This minor planet is named after the site where ESO's discovering La Silla Observatory is situated. La Silla is a 2400-metre mountain on the outskirts of the Atacama Desert, north of the city of La Serena in northern Chile. The official naming citation was published by the Minor Planet Center on 1 December 1979 (M.P.C. 5039).
