= C/2000 WM1 (LINEAR) =

Parabolic comet

C/2000 WM_{1} (LINEAR)
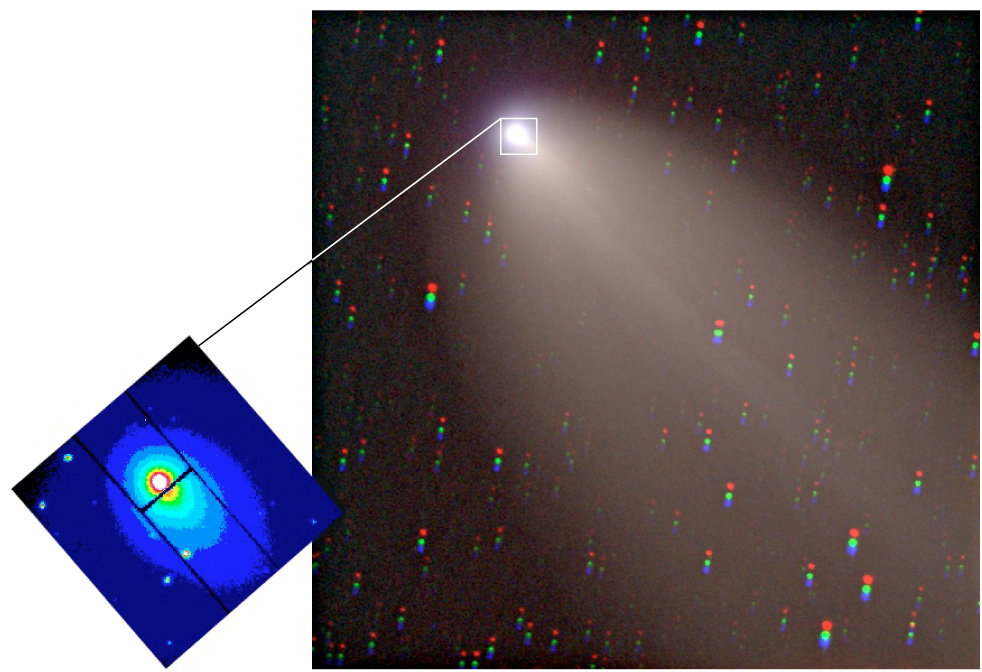
- Image of Comet LINEAR (C/2000 WM1) with ESO's UVES slit viewer image.

Discovery
- Discovered by: LINEAR
- Discovery date: 16 December 2000

Orbital characteristics
- Epoch: 24 January 2002 (JD 2452298.5)
- Observation arc: 981 days (2.69 years)
- Earliest precovery date: 16 November 2000
- Number of observations: 2,130
- Perihelion: 0.555 AU
- Eccentricity: 1.00024
- Inclination: 72.55°
- Longitude of ascending node: 239.89°
- Argument of periapsis: 276.77°
- Mean anomaly: 0.000012°
- Last perihelion: 22 January 2002
- Earth MOID: 0.013 AU
- Jupiter MOID: 2.896 AU

Physical characteristics
- Dimensions: 3.4–4.0 km (2.1–2.5 mi)
- Mean diameter: 3.8 km (2.4 mi)
- Comet total magnitude (M1): 11.2
- Apparent magnitude: 2.5 (2002 apparition)

C/2000 WM_{1} (LINEAR) is a non-periodic comet discovered by LINEAR on 16 December 2000. The comet brightened to an apparent magnitude of about 2.5.

== Observational history ==
The comet was discovered on 16 December 2000 by the LINEAR team. It looked like an asteroid with an apparent magnitude of 17.8. It was also found in images obtained by LINEAR on 16 and 18 November 2000, when it had a magnitude of 18. Timothy Bruce Spahr observed the object with the 1.2-m reflector telescope of the Smithsonian Astrophysical Observatory and found it had a coma 10 arcseconds across and a broad, faint tail that was 10-20 arcseconds long. The ephemeris published upon discovery predicted it would a reach a magnitude of around 4 in early January 2000, and thus become visible with the naked eye.

The comet by late August 2001 had brightened to an apparent magnitude of 14 and in late September its magnitude was estimated to be 11.5 based on visual observations. On 14 November the comet was reported to have an apparent magnitude 7.2 and a tail 1.1 degrees long was visible with 10×50 binoculars. On 3 December the comet had brightened to a magnitude of 5.3 and its coma had an estimated diameter of 21 arcminutes.

The comet approached Earth at a distance of 0.316 AU (47.3 million km; 29.4 million mi) on 2 December 2001, on its way to perihelion. After mid December it became more easily observed from the southern hemisphere. The comet had an estimated magnitude of 6 in early January 2002, but around perihelion it experienced an outburst and on 27 January, five days after perihelion, brightened to a magnitude 4.6. Two days later its apparent magnitude was reported to be 2.8 to 3. Its tail was reported to be several degrees long. The comet then faded following the predicted curve. In late March 2002, when its magnitude was reported to be 9–10, it became visible from the northern hemisphere again.

The comet was last observed on 8 August 2002, when it had an apparent magnitude of 14.

== Scientific results ==
The spectrum of C/2000 WM1 was obtained in near infrared by the Near Infrared Echelle Spectrograph (NIRSPEC) at Keck-2 Observatory on 23–25 November 2001, as the comet approached the Sun. The comet has been found to be depleted in methanol and carbon monoxide relative to water. CO and acetylene were considerably depleted when compared with Oort cloud comets, while hydrogen cyanide, methane and methanol were moderately depleted. The radio spectrum of the comet also indicated it was depleted in CO and hydrogen sulfide. The cause of this has been suggested to be that the comet formed closer to the Sun than the Oort cloud comets and was later ejected to the Oort cloud.

Other spectrographic studies have found diatomic carbon (C2), triatomic carbon (C3), cyanide (CN), amino radical (NH2), water cation, and maybe diatomic carbon anion. The spectrum obtained on 1 December 2001 with the Fiber fed Extended Range Optical Spectrograph (FEROS) of ESO also revealed the presence of methylidyne radical (CH) neutral molecule and cation, and CO+. The CN production rate was estimated to be 2.43×10^{26} molecules per second and C2 production rate was 3.1×10^{26} molecules per second on 2–4 December 2001, indicated that the comet is relatively enriched in diatomic carbon. The ratio of hydrogen cyanide (HCN) and hydrogen isocyanide (HNC) was HNC/HCN = 0.09–0.19, similar to that of 153P/Ikeya-Zhang.

The UVES spectrograph on the 8.2-m Very Large Telescope KUEYEN was used to obtain the ultraviolet-visual spectrum of the comet in mid-March 2002, after perihelion. Of particular interest is the unambiguous detection and measurement of the nitrogen-15 isotope. The only other comet in which this isotope had been observed until then was Comet Hale-Bopp. The isotopic abundance ratio was the same in both comets, about 1 nitrogen-15 atom for each 140 nitrogen-14 atoms (14 N/15 N = 140±30), which is about half of the terrestrial value (272). On the other hand, the 12 C/13 C isotopic ratio was 115±20, close to the "standard" solar system value of 89.

The dust coma was symmetrical before perihelion along the Sun-comet axis, with a tail and a sunward structure with projected length of about 20,000 kilometers, but when imaging CN, a faint and double-jet structure with projected length of 11,500 km (7,100 mi). On 13 December 2001 the water production was estimated to be 5.2×10^{28} molecules per second, indicating an active sublimation area of 10 km^{2} and thus a nucleus with a diameter of at least 1.8 km (1.1 mi).
