= 123P/West–Hartley =

Periodic comet

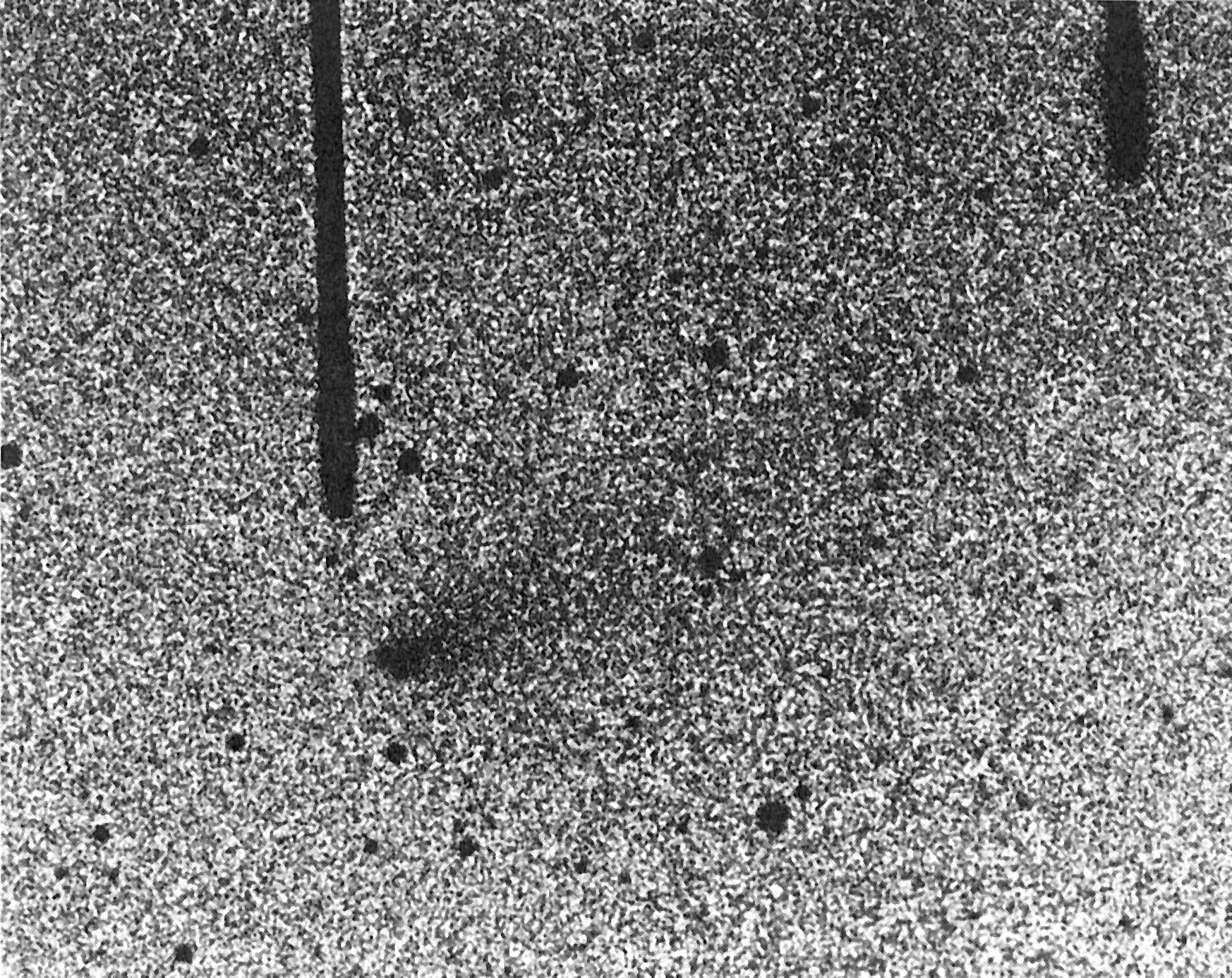
- Discovery image of Comet West–Hartley taken from ESO on 11 May 1989

Discovery
- Discovered by: Richard M. West; Malcolm Hartley
- Discovery site: European Southern Observatory
- Discovery date: 11 May 1989

Designations
- MPC designation: P/1989 E3, P/1995 S2
- Alternative designations: 1988 XVI, 1989k

Orbital characteristics
- Epoch: 7 October 2026 (JD 2461320.5)
- Observation arc: 30.39 years
- Number of observations: 4,399
- Aphelion: 5.616 AU
- Perihelion: 2.159 AU
- Semi-major axis: 3.887 AU
- Eccentricity: 0.44469
- Orbital period: 7.665 years
- Inclination: 15.281°
- Longitude of ascending node: 45.848°
- Argument of periapsis: 103.88°
- Mean anomaly: 1.945°
- Last perihelion: 21 September 2026
- Next perihelion: 22 May 2034
- T_{Jupiter}: 2.832
- Earth MOID: 1.197 AU
- Jupiter MOID: 0.704 AU

Physical characteristics
- Mean radius: 2.18±0.23 km
- Mean density: 520±80 kg/m^{3}
- Synodic rotation period: 3.7 hours
- Comet total magnitude (M1): 8.2
- Comet nuclear magnitude (M2): 13.8
- Apparent magnitude: 17.5 (2026-04-03)

Comet West–Hartley is a periodic comet roughly 4 km in diameter with a 7.67-year orbit around the Sun. The current orbit does not bring it closer than about 1.2 AU (180 million km) from Earth. It came to perihelion on 21 September 2026 and comes to opposition on 1 May 2027. It next reaches perihelion on 22 May 2034.

== Physical characteristics ==
The first attempts to measure the effective radius of its nucleus in 2000 were not successful due to too much scatter data in light curves obtained to provide reliable estimates. Recent attempts to measure the comet's light curves between 2004 and 2015 revealed that the nucleus is about 2.18 km (1.35 mi) in radius, rotating once every 3.7 hours.

Numbered comets
Previous; 122P/de Vico	123P/West–Hartley	Next; 124P/Mrkos
