= Adriaan Blaauw =

Dutch astronomer (1914–2010)

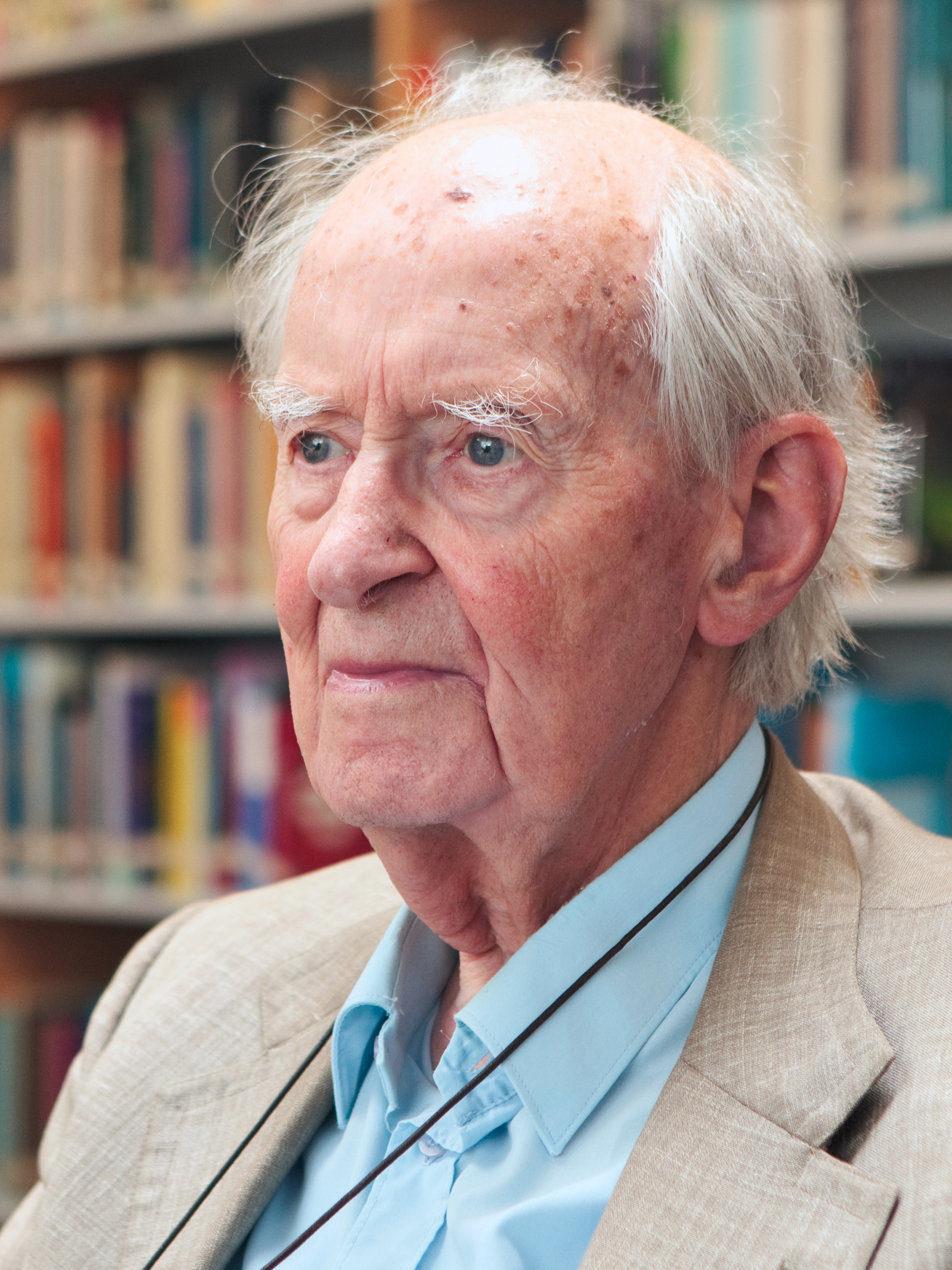
- Born: 12 April 1914; Amsterdam, Netherlands
- Died: 1 December 2010 (aged 96); Groningen, Netherlands
- Education: Leiden University; University of Groningen
- Known for: Star formation
- Scientific career
- Fields: Astronomy
- Workplaces: Kapteyn Astronomical Institute; European Southern Observatory; Leiden University

Adriaan Blaauw (12 April 1914 – 1 December 2010) was a Dutch astronomer.

Blaauw was born in Amsterdam to Cornelis Blaauw and Gesina Clasina Zwart, and studied at Leiden University and the University of Groningen, obtaining his doctorate at the latter in 1946. In 1948, he was appointed an associate professor at Leiden. In the 1950s he worked a few years at the Yerkes Observatory, before returning to Europe in 1957 to become director of the Kapteyn Astronomical Institute in Groningen. Blaauw was closely involved in the founding of the European Southern Observatory, and was its general director from 1970 to 1975. In 1975, he returned to the Netherlands, becoming a full professor at Leiden, until his retirement in 1981. From 1976 to 1979, he served as president of the International Astronomical Union. He chaired the committee for assigning scientific priorities for the observing programme of the astrometric satellite Hipparcos. His research has involved star formation, the motions of star clusters and stellar associations, and distance scale. His main contributions are the explanation of the origin of stars that move with high velocity in our galaxy and the description of star formation in associations.

Among his many honours he was made member of the Royal Netherlands Academy of Arts and Sciences in 1963, elected a Foreign Honorary Member of the American Academy of Arts and Sciences in 1973. He was awarded the Prix Jules Janssen by the Société astronomique de France in 1978. In 1989, he was awarded the Bruce Medal. In 1997, the University of Groningen instituted a Blaauw chair and Blaauw lecture in his honour. The asteroid 2145 Blaauw and the Blaauw Observatory are named after him. He died in 2010 in the city of Groningen.

== Honors ==
Asteroid 2145 Blaauw is named for him.
