= C/1975 V1 (West) =

Great Comet of 1976

C/1975 V1 (West) (Great Comet of 1976)
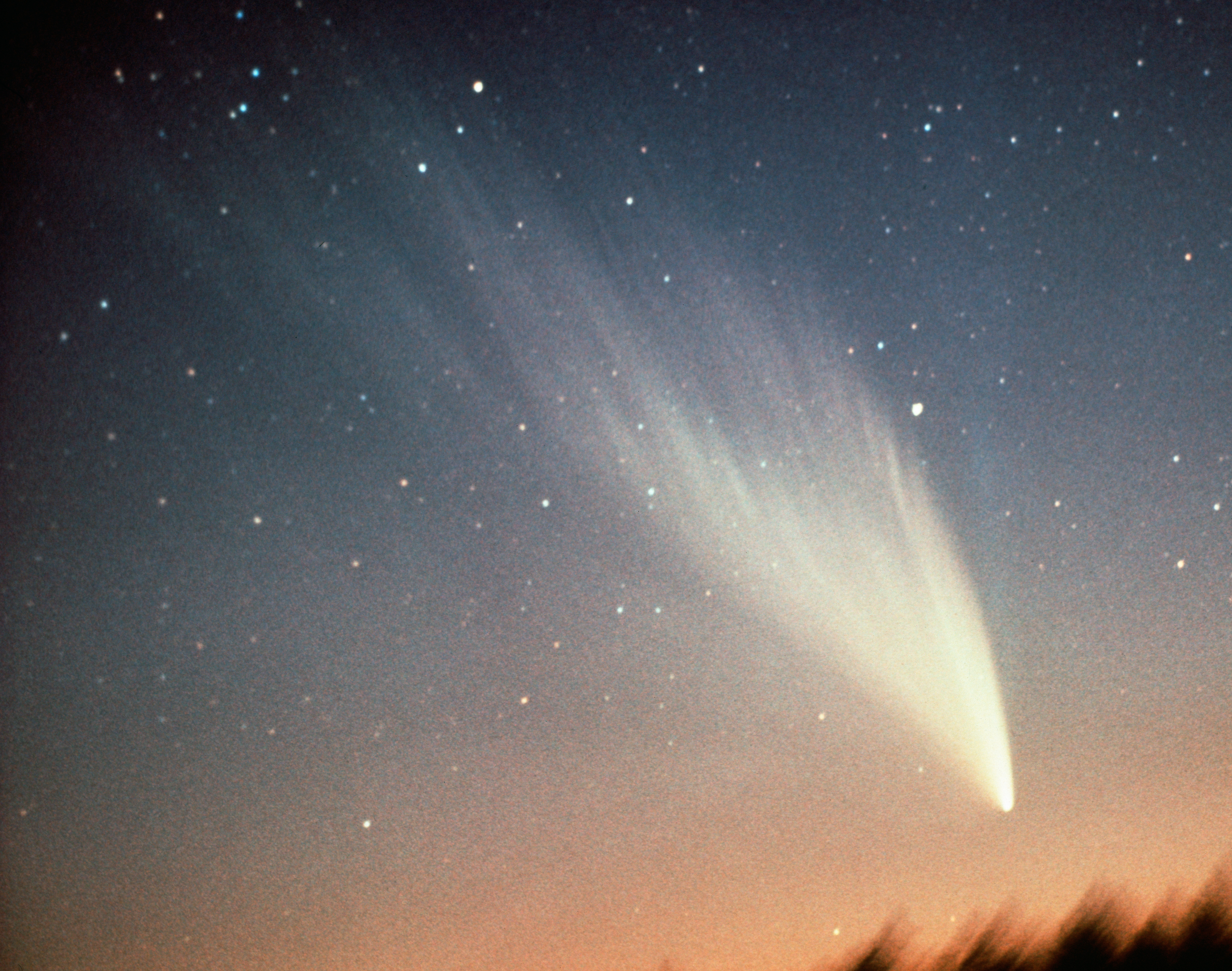
- Comet West photographed from the European Southern Observatory on 9 March 1976

Discovery
- Discovered by: Richard M. West
- Discovery site: European Southern Observatory
- Discovery date: 10 August 1975

Designations
- Alternative designations: 1976 VI, 1975n

Orbital characteristics
- Epoch: 10 May 1976 (JD 2442908.5)
- Observation arc: 199 days
- Number of observations: 113
- Aphelion: 1,500 AU (inbound)
- Perihelion: 0.197 AU
- Eccentricity: 0.99997
- Orbital period: ~558,000 years
- Inclination: 43.074°
- Longitude of ascending node: 118.92°
- Argument of periapsis: 358.43°
- Last perihelion: 25 February 1976
- T_{Jupiter}: 0.402
- Earth MOID: 0.555 AU
- Jupiter MOID: 1.194 AU

Physical characteristics
- Mean radius: 1.485 km (0.923 mi) (Note: Calculated mean radius using the formula: $\log_{10}\,(\,R\,)\ =\;0.9 +\;0.13 (\,H\,)$ Where $\,H\,$ is the comet's absolute total magnitude (M1))
- Comet total magnitude (M1): 5.6
- Apparent magnitude: –3.0 (1976 apparition)

Comet West, formally designated as C/1975 V1, 1976 VI, and 1975n, was a comet described as one of the brightest objects to pass through the inner Solar System in 1976. It is often described as a "great comet". Reports indicate it could be seen in daylight.

== Observational history ==
Animation of C/1975 V1 orbit around Sun C/1975 V1 · Sun · Mercury · Venus · Earth · Mars

It was discovered photographically by Richard M. West, of the European Southern Observatory, on 10 August 1975. The comet came to perihelion (closest approach to the Sun) on 25 February 1976. During perihelion the comet had a minimum solar elongation of 6.4° and as a result of forward scattering reached a peak apparent magnitude of −3. From 25 to 27 February, observers reported that the comet was bright enough to study during full daylight.

Despite its brightness, Comet West went largely unreported in the popular media. This was partly due to the relatively disappointing display of Comet Kohoutek in 1973, which had been widely predicted to become extremely prominent: scientists were wary of making predictions that might raise public expectations.

The New York Times, however, reported this about Comet West on 2 March 1976:

From tomorrow until Sunday a comet that may prove one of the brightest in this decade is expected to reach maximum visibility in the eastern sky before sunrise. ... By Wednesday, Dr. Marsden believes, it will be far enough from the sun to be visible to the unaided eye

— Walter Sullivan, The New York Times (2 March 1976)

=== Breakup ===
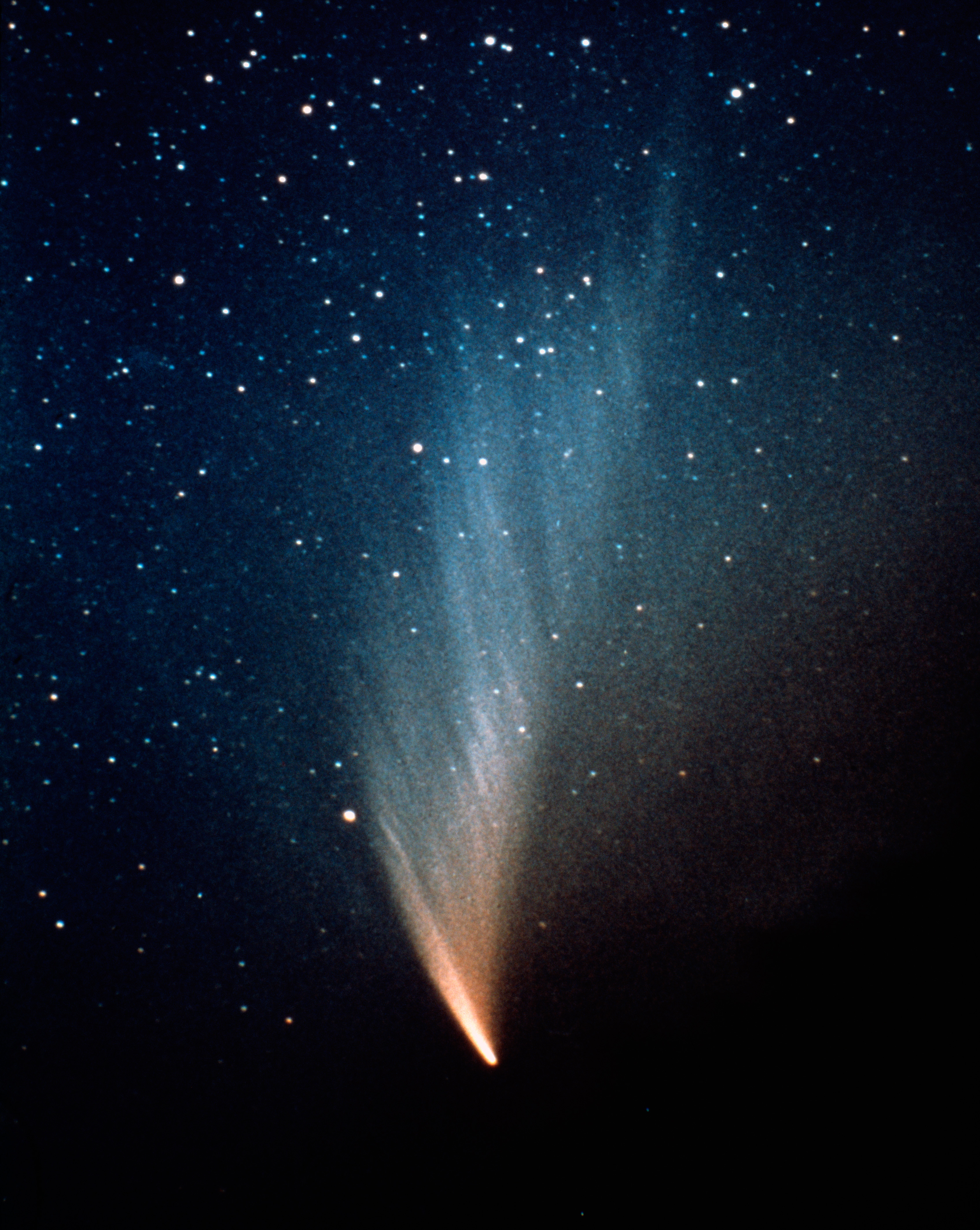
Comet West in March 1976, around peak brightness

Before the perihelion passage, and using 28 positions obtained between 10 August 1975 and 27 January 1976, Comet West was estimated to have an orbital period of about 254,000 years. As the comet passed within 30 million km of the Sun, the nucleus was observed to split into four fragments.

The first report of the split came around 7 March 1976 at 12:30 UTC, when reports were received that the comet had broken into two pieces. Astronomer Steven O'Meara, using the 9-inch Harvard Refractor, reported that two additional fragments had formed on the morning of 18 March.

The fragmentation of the nucleus was, at the time, one of very few comet breakups observed, one of the most notable previous examples being the Great Comet of 1882, a member of the Kreutz Sungrazing 'family' of comets. More recently, comets Schwassmann–Wachmann-3 (73P), C/1999 S4 LINEAR, and 57P/du Toit-Neujmin-Delporte, have been observed to split or disintegrate during their passage close to the Sun.

== Orbit ==
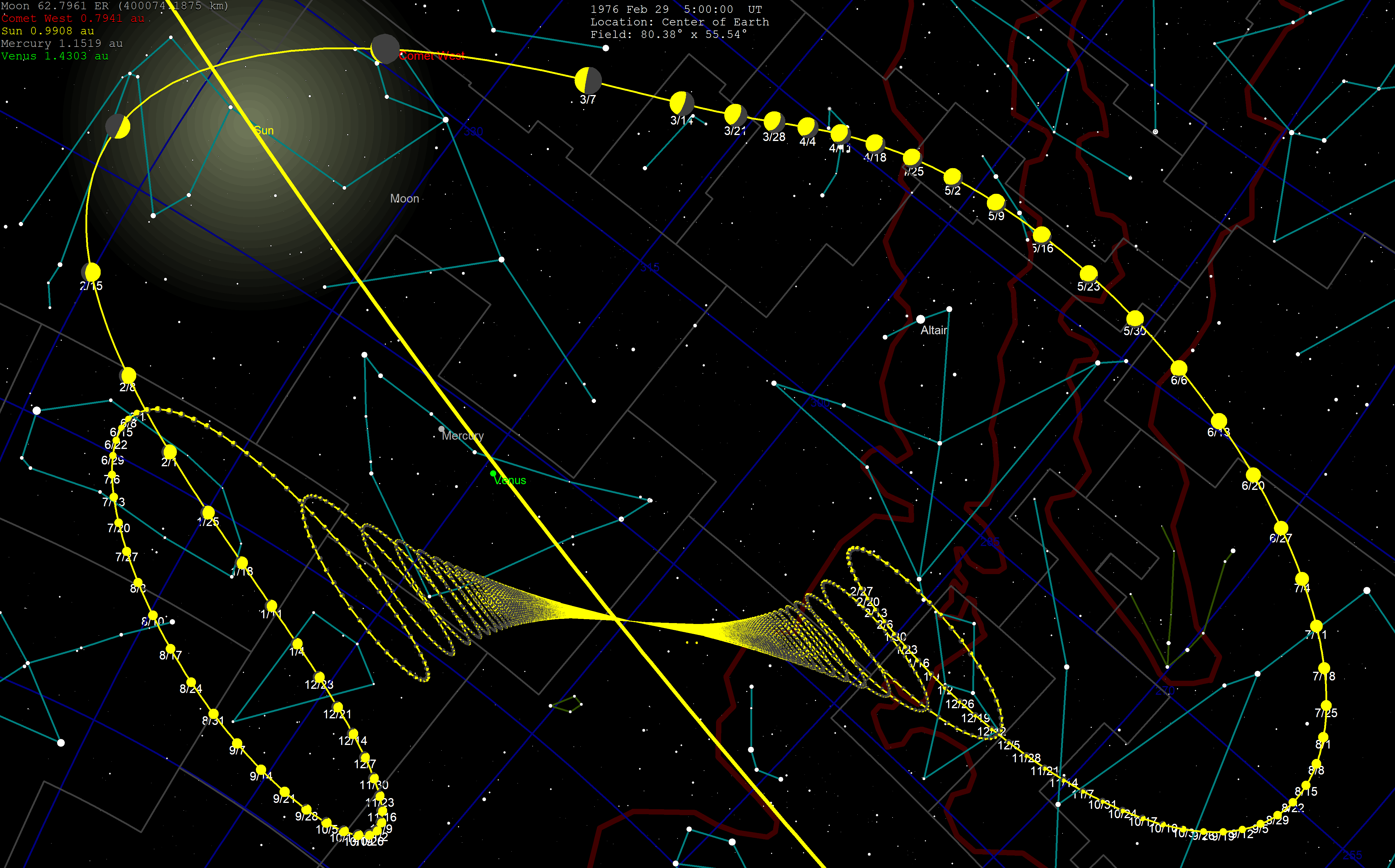
Sky path for Comet West, with 7-day motion. The retrograde loops are caused by parallax from Earth's annual motion around the Sun. The most movement occurs when the comet is closest to Earth.

With a nearly parabolic trajectory, estimates for the orbital period of this comet have varied from 254,000 to 558,000 years. Computing the best-fit orbit for this long-period comet is made more difficult since it underwent a splitting event which may have caused a non-gravitational perturbation of the orbit. The 2008 SAO Catalog of Cometary Orbits shows 195 observations for C/1975 V1 and 135 for C/1975 V1-A, for a combined total of 330 (218 observations were used in the fit).

The comet has been more than 50 AU (7.5 billion km) from the Sun since 2003.

== Physical characteristics ==
A 2014 reanalysis of photometric observations of the comet during its perihelion in 1976 revealed that the dust particles emitted from its coma were a mixture of weakly refractive and highly refractive material, indicating the presence of magnesium-rich silicates and amorphous carbon within the comet itself. The observed morphology of agglomerated debris is consistent to those found in other comets like 1P/Halley and Hale–Bopp.

Emission lines of C_{2}, CN, C_{3}, CH, and NH_{2} were detected from the comet. Photometric observations of the comet's fragments about two months after it split apart had revealed an uneven distribution of the aforementioned compounds, indicating that the original nucleus was heterogeneous with significant composition variations in some areas.

== Nomenclature ==
In the nomenclature of the time, it was known as Comet 1976 VI or Comet 1975n, but the modern nomenclature is C/1975 V1. (Note that "1976 VI" uses the Roman numeral VI = 6, while "C/1975 V1" is the letter V and the number 1).

== See also ==
- List of Solar System objects by greatest aphelion
