= 1970 in aviation =

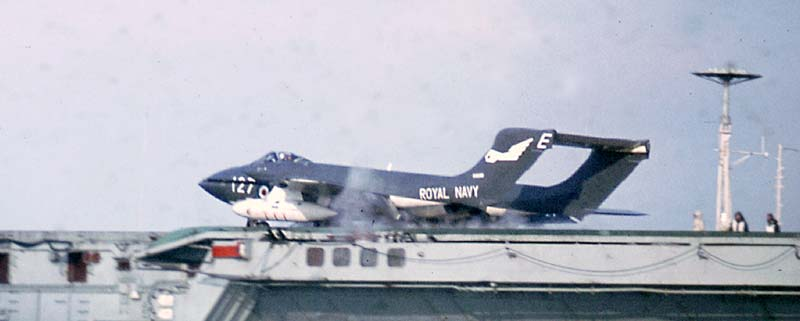
The Sea Vixen launching from the HMS Eagle in January 1970.

This is a list of aviation-related events from 1970.

== Events ==
=== January ===
- January 1
  - Nord-Aviation, Sud-Aviation, and SEREB merge to form SNIAS (the future Aérospatiale).
  - A Cruzeiro do Sul Sud Aviation SE-210 Caravelle VI-R (registration PP-PDZ) is hijacked by six passengers during a flight from Montevideo, Uruguay, to Rio de Janeiro, Brazil, with 33 people on board. The hijackers demand that it fly them to Cuba. Over the next two days, the airliner makes stops at Lima, Peru, and Panama City, Panama, before finally arriving at Havana, Cuba, on 3 January.
- January 4 – Fascinated with the kind of communism practiced in Albania under its leader Enver Hoxha, 18-year-old Mariano Ventura Rodriguez pulls out a toy pistol aboard an Iberia Convair CV-240 ten minutes before it lands at Zaragoza, Spain, after a domestic flight from Madrid. He demands to be flown to Albania. When the airliner lands at Zaragoza, Spanish soldiers armed with submachine guns surround it. During negotiations between Rodriguez and the police, the local police chief tells him that he will be "shot at dawn" if anything happens to any of the plane's passengers or crew, prompting Rodriguez to surrender peacefully soon afterward.
- January 6 – Anton Funjek, a 41-year-old Yugoslav man on probation for threatening President Richard Nixon, pulls out a knife and grabs a stewardess aboard Delta Air Lines Flight 274, a Douglas DC-9 with 65 people aboard flying from Orlando to Jacksonville, Florida, and demands to be flown to Switzerland. The captain makes a deliberately hard landing at Jacksonville International Airport to throw Funjek off balance, and three passengers overpower him when he stumbles.
- January 7 – A hijacker aboard Iberia Flight 032, a Convair CV-440-62 (registration EC-ATG) on a domestic flight from Madrid to Zaragoza, Spain, demands to be flown to Albania. The hijacker surrenders after the airliner lands at Zaragoza Airport.
- January 8 – To protest an Israeli military operation that resulted in the capture of several Lebanese nationals, Christian Bellon, armed with two handguns and a rifle, hijacks Trans World Airlines Flight 802, a Boeing 707 with 20 people on board flying from Paris to Rome, and demands to be flown to Damascus, Syria, spraying the airliner's instrument panel with gunfire to emphasize how serious he is. After the airliner lands in Rome to refuel, Bellon changes his mind and demands that the plane fly him to Beirut, Lebanon, instead. When the airliner lands at Beirut International Airport, Bellon surrenders to Lebanese police, who slap him across the face several times.
- January 9 – A hijacker takes control of a Rutas Aéreas Panameñas SA (RAPSA) Douglas C-47 Skytrain making a domestic flight in Panama from David to Bocas del Toro, demanding to be flown to Cuba. Security forces storm the plane at David and arrest the hijacker. There is one fatality during the hijacking.
- January 12 – A Hellenic Air Force Douglas C-47 Skytrain crashes in Greece's Cithaeron mountain range. Press reports variously state that 25 people were on board and all died, 27 were on board and four survived, or 30 were on board and four survived. It is the third-deadliest aviation accident in Greek history at the time.
- January 13 – Polynesian Airlines Flight 208B, a Douglas C-47B-45DK Skytrain (registration 5W-FAC), encounters wind shear one minute after takeoff from Faleolo Airport in Apia, Western Samoa. Its nose pitches up, and it stalls, crashes into the Pacific Ocean, and explodes, killing all 32 people on board. It is the deadliest aviation accident in the history of Western Samoa (now Samoa).
- January 14 – A Faucett Perú Douglas RC-54V Skymaster (registration OB-R-776) crashes into Pozo Chuño Mountain in Peru's Contumazá District, killing all 28 people on board.
- January 22 – Pan American World Airways begins the world's first wide-body airliner service, introducing the first Boeing 747 into service on the New York-London route.
- January 24 – A man accompanied by two women and a baby hijacks an ALM Antillean Airlines Fokker F27 Friendship 500 (registration PJ-FRM) flying from Santo Domingo in the Dominican Republic to Curaçao in the Netherlands Antilles with 31 people aboard. He demands that he and his companions be flown to Cuba. The pilot first lands in Haiti in the hope of refueling there but is unable to refuel. He then proceeds to Santiago de Cuba in Cuba.
- January 25 – A Convair CV-240-2 (registration XC-DOK) operated by the Mexican Comisión Federal de Electricidad (Federal Electricity Commission) and carrying journalists covering the Mexican presidential campaign on a flight from Mexico City crashes into La Vega hill while on approach to El Tajín National Airport in Tihuatlán, Mexico, killing 19 of the 20 people on board.
- January 28 – After its crew prematurely initiates their descent to a landing at Batagay Airport in Batagay in the Soviet Union's Russian Soviet Federated Socialist Republic, an Aeroflot Antonov An-24B (registration CCCP-47701) crashes into the rocky slope of a 1,081-meter (3,547-foot) mountain 40 kilometers (25 miles) northeast of Batagay at an altitude of 1,020 meters (3,350 feet). All 34 people on board die in the crash.
- January 29 – Aeroflot Flight 145, a Tupolev Tu-124V (registration CCCP-45083) on approach to Kilpyavr air base in Murmansk in the Soviet Union strikes the side of a hill 29 kilometers (18 miles) from the air base and slides down its slope before coming to rest. Of the 38 people on board, five die on impact and six more freeze to death while awaiting rescue.
- January 31 – The Soviet aerospace engineer Mikhail Mil, founder of the Mil Moscow Helicopter Plant dies, aged 61.

=== February ===
- The last flight of an active U.S. Navy antisubmarine Lockheed P-2 Neptune takes place, with Rear Admiral Tom Davies at the controls. The P-2 had been in active U.S. Navy service since March 1947, and Davies had set a world distance record in the Neptune Truculent Turtle in September 1946.
- Vickers-Armstrongs ceases production of the Vickers VC10 after manufacturing 54 of the aircraft.
- February 4
  - Descending in poor visibility, TAROM Flight RO35, an Antonov An-24B (registration YR-AMT) with 21 people on board, strikes trees in Romania's Vlădeasa Mountains, crashes on a mountain slope, and breaks up. All six crew members and seven of the passengers die instantly, and six more passengers die before rescuers arrive, leaving only one survivor.
  - Aerolíneas Argentinas Flight 707, an Avro 748-105 Srs. 1, encounters severe turbulence and crashes near Loma Alta in Chaco Province, Argentina, killing all 37 people on board.
- February 6
  - During its descent to a landing at Samarkand Airport at Samarkand in the Soviet Union's Uzbek Soviet Socialist Republic, an Aeroflot Ilyusin Il-18V (registration CCCP-75798) crashes into a mountain 32 kilometers (20 miles) northeast of the airport at an altitude of 1,500 meters (4,900 feet), killing 92 of the 106 people on board.
  - Two men, each armed with a handgun, hijack a LAN Chile Sud Aviation SE-210 Caravelle during a domestic flight in Chile from Puerto Montt to Santiago with 47 people on board. After the airliner lands at Pudahuel International Airport in Santiago, the hijackers release seven adults and five children and order the plane to be refueled. Two policemen disguised as mechanics then board the airliner and overpower the hijackers, killing one of them.
- February 12 – After suffering engine failure, a Líneas Aéreas La Urraca Douglas C-47-DL Skytrain crashes near Puerto López, Colombia. Thirteen of the 14 people on board die on impact; the only person recovered alive from the crash site later dies of his injuries.
- February 15
  - Hugh Dowding, the commander of Royal Air Force Fighter Command during the Battle of Britain, dies at the age of 87.
  - A Dominicana de Aviación McDonnell Douglas DC-9-32 crashes into the Caribbean Sea two minutes after takeoff from Las Américas International Airport in Santo Domingo in the Dominican Republic following engine failure, killing all 102 people on board. World lightweight boxing champion Carlos Cruz and his wife and two children, as well as 12 members of the Puerto Rican national women's volleyball team, are among the dead. The Puerto Rican salsa orchestra El Gran Combo de Puerto Rico had planned to board the flight, but chooses not to after one of its members has a bad feeling about the flight and convinces the others not to take it.
- February 16 – Flying with his wife, 10-year-old daughter, and eight-year-old son aboard Eastern Airlines Flight 1 – a Boeing 727 flying from Newark, New Jersey to Miami, Florida, with 104 people on board – Daniel Lopez jumps up with a flaming "Molotov cocktail" and a pistol equipped with a crude bayonet when the airliner is 80 miles south of Wilmington, North Carolina, shouts "Viva Cuba!" and demands to be flown to Havana, Cuba. The flight crew agrees to fly him there as long as he extinguishes his Molotov cocktail. Lopez and his family disembark at Havana, and the airliner returns to the United States after about five hours on the ground in Havana. An investigation reveals that Eastern Airlines did not screen any of the passengers boarding the flight.
- February 17–18 – United States Air Force Boeing B-52 Stratofortresses attack Laos.
- February 21 – A bomb explodes in the cargo compartment of Swissair Flight 330, a Convair CV-990, nine minutes after takeoff from Zurich International Airport in Zürich, Switzerland. The flight crew attempts to return to Zürich, but have difficulty seeing their instruments because of smoke in the cockpit; the aircraft finally suffers an electrical failure and crashes near Lucerne, Switzerland, killing all 47 people on board. Responsibility for the bombing is never determined.
- February 24 – The Royal Navy recommissions the aircraft carrier HMS Ark Royal after a £UK 30 million refit of the ship.
- February 25 – Trans World Airlines inaugurates scheduled nonstop Boeing 747 service between Los Angeles, California, and New York City, thus becoming the first airline to offer domestic Boeing 747 service in the United States.
- February 27
  - Hawker Siddeley begins buying back surplus Hawker Hunters from the Royal Air Force to remanufacture for new customers.
  - The British light aircraft manufacturer Beagle Aircraft goes into voluntary liquidation.

=== March ===
- The United States confirms that SA-2 Guideline surface-to-air missiles are deployed in Laos.
- March 6
  - British European Airways (BE) opens its charter service, BEA Airtours.
  - A Handley Page Jetstream suffers engine failure on approach to Samedan Airport outside St. Moritz, Switzerland, and crashes 3 kilometers (1.9 miles) short of the runway, killing all 11 people on board.
- March 10 – A young husband and wife, Eckhard and Christel Wehage, hijack an Interflug Antonov An-24 with 15 other passengers on board during a domestic flight in East Germany from East Berlin to Leipzig, demanding to be flown to Hanover, West Germany. The pilot claims not to have enough fuel to reach Hanover, so the Wehages agree to land at Tempelhof Airport in West Berlin. When the plane lands at Schönefeld Airport in East Berlin instead, the Wehages commit suicide.
- March 11
  - Four passengers hijack an Avianca Boeing 727-59 (registration HK-1337) with 78 people on board 20 minutes after takeoff from Bogotá, Colombia, for a domestic flight to Barranquilla, demanding to be flown to Cuba. The airliner refuels at Barranquilla before proceeding to Havana, Cuba.
  - Flying under the name "R. Evans" and accompanied by his wife and their four young daughters, 36-year-old Clemmie Stubbs hijacks United Airlines Flight 361 – a Boeing 727 flying from Cleveland, Ohio, to West Palm Beach, Florida – as it passes over Pittsburgh, Pennsylvania, and forces it fly to Cuba, where he believes his family will prosper and flourish under the communist regime of Fidel Castro. Imprisoned in Cuba, he will be killed in a prison escape attempt in 1973, and his family will return to the United States in 1974.
- March 12 – A hijacker commandeers Varig Flight 862, a Boeing 707-345C (registration PP-VJX) during a flight from Santiago, Chile, to London and forces it to fly to Cuba.
- March 14 – A Paraense Transportes Aéreos Fairchild FH-227B (registration PP-BUF) on approach to Val de Cans International Airport in Belém, Brazil, crashes into Guajara Bay 800 meters (2,600 feet) short of the runway, killing 38 of the 40 people on board.
- March 16 – A United States Navy Lockheed EC-121K Warning Star attempting to land at Da Nang Air Base in Da Nang, South Vietnam, with its No. 3 engine feathered stalls, crashes, cartwheels into a United States Air Force hangar area, and breaks into three pieces, with its cockpit and fuselage forward of the wing sliding into a revetment wall and burning, its center section landing upside down in a street and burning, and its tail section landing on a softball field. Of the 28 men on board, 23 die, four suffer grave injuries, and one walks away from the tail section unharmed.
- March 17 – Unable to pay his fare aboard Eastern Air Lines Flight 1340 – a Douglas DC-9-31 (registration N8925E) with 73 people on board operating a shuttle service from Newark, New Jersey, to Boston, Massachusetts – John DiVivo pulls out .38-caliber revolver and orders the pilot to "just fly east until we run out of gas." After about 15 minutes, the captain convinces DiVivo that the airliner will crash into the Atlantic Ocean soon if it does not refuel. Although DiVivo approves a refueling stop, he shoots both pilots when they start to turn the plane. A struggle ensues in the cockpit, during which the mortally wounded copilot knocks the revolver from DiVivo's hand and the captain, despite serious wounds in both arms, picks it up and shoots DiVivo in the chest. The captain then lands the DC-9 at Logan International Airport in Boston, where DiVivo is arrested. The copilot is the first pilot killed in a U.S. hijacking. DiVivo hangs himself in his jail cell on October 31.
- March 24 – Two hijackers commandeer an Aerolineas Argentinas de Havilland DH-106 Comet 4 (registration LV-AHN) with 62 people on board during a domestic flight in Argentina from Córdoba to San Miguel de Tucumán, demanding to be flown to Cuba. The airliner stops at Santiago, Chile – where the hijackers allow 14 people to disembark – and at Lima, Peru, before arriving at Havana, Cuba.
- March 28 – A United States Navy F-4J Phantom II fighter of Fighter Squadron 142 (VF-142) shoots down a North Vietnamese MiG-21 fighter. It is the only American air-to-air kill in the Vietnam War between September 1968 and January 1971.
- March 30 – A Royal Malaysian Air Force de Havilland Canada DHC-4A Caribou crashes into Malaysia's Cowie Bay, killing all 10 people on board.
- March 31 – In what becomes known in Japan as the Yodogo Hijacking, nine members of the Japanese Communist League-Red Army Faction, a predecessor of the Japanese Red Army, hijack a Boeing 727-89 operating as Japan Airlines Flight 351 with 129 other people on board on a flight from Tokyo to Fukuoka, Japan. They release their hostages during stops at Fukuoka and at Seoul, South Korea, before proceeding to Pyongyang, North Korea, where they surrender to North Korean authorities who grant them political asylum. The future Roman Catholic archbishop and cardinal Stephen Fumio Hamao is a passenger on the plane, and one of the hijackers is Moriaki Wakabayashi, a bass guitar player who was an early member of the avant-garde rock band Les Rallizes Denudes.

=== April ===
- When three Haitian Coast Guard ships rebel against President François Duvalier and shell the presidential palace at Port-au-Prince, loyal Haitian Air Force pilots whose bombs had been confiscated out of fear that they also might rebel instead use 55-gallon drums of gasoline (petrol) to attack the ships. They score no hits.
- April 1
  - Aeroflot Flight 661, an Antonov An-24B (registration CCCP-47751) on a domestic flight in the Soviet Union from Novosibirsk to Krasnoyarsk, collides with a Hydrometeorological Research Center of the USSR radiosonde weather balloon over Novosibirsk Oblast about 20 kilometers (12 miles) southeast of Toguchin at an altitude of 5,400 meters (17,700 feet). The collision detaches the nose section of the An-24B, and the aircraft enters a steep descent and begins to disintegrate at an altitude of 2,000 meters (6,600 feet), some of its pieces catching fire before landing on farm land. All 45 people on board die.
  - A Royal Air Maroc Sud Aviation Caravelle III on approach to Nouasseur Airport in Casablanca, Morocco, crashes near Berrechid. Its fuselage breaks in two, and 61 of the 82 people on board die.
- April 2 – Royal Air Inter, a subsidiary of Royal Air Maroc, is formed to fly domestic routes in Morocco using Fokker F27 Friendships, begins flight operations.
- April 4 – After the crew of Aeroflot Flight 2903, an Ilyushin Il-14P (registration CCCP-52002), notices that they are low on approach in poor visibility to Zaporozhye Airport at Zaporozhye in the Soviet Union's Ukrainian Soviet Socialist Republic and initiates a go-around at an altitude of 40 meters (130 feet), the airliner's right wing strikes the ground during a turn and the plane crashes, killing seven of the 35 people on board.
- April 10
  - A United States Air Force Lockheed C-130A Hercules suffers a double engine failure and attempts to ditch in the Pacific Ocean off Okinawa, killing all 11 people on board.
  - An Aerocosta Colombia Curtiss C-46D-10-CU Commando cargo plane with 5,000 kilograms (11,000 pounds) of carcasses and a crew of four on board disappears over the Caribbean Sea during a flight from Santa Marta, Colombia, to Pointe-à-Pitre, Guadeloupe.
- April 14 – An Ecuatoriana Douglas C-54D-1-DC Skymaster cargo plane (registration HC-AON) crashes immediately after takeoff from Miami International Airport in Miami, Florida, for a flight to Quito, Ecuador, killing its two-man crew.
- April 18 – Two Soviet Navy Tupolev Tu-20 (NATO reporting name "BEAR D") reconnaissance/missile-targeting aircraft land at José Martí International Airport outside Havana, Cuba, the first time that any variant of the BEAR has landed outside the Soviet Bloc. The visit begins periodic flights by BEAR D and Tupolev Tu-142 (NATO reporting name "BEAR F") aircraft between the Soviet Union and Cuba that continue until the Soviet Union's collapse two decades later.
- April 21 – An explosion in a lavatory blows the tail off of a Philippine Air Lines Hawker Siddeley HS 748-209 Srs. 2 (registration PI-C1022) as it cruises at 10,500 feet (3,200 meters) over Cabanatuan on Luzon in the Philippines. The airliner crashes, killing all 36 people on board.
- April 22 – Twenty-six-year-old Ira David "Orrie" Meeks and his 17-year-old girlfriend hire pilot Boyce Stradley to take them on a sightseeing flight in a Cessna 172 over Gastonia, North Carolina, during which Meeks pulls a gun on Stradley and orders him to fly them to Cuba so that Meeks can "get away from racism in the United States." During the 11-hour trip to Havana, Cuba, the plane makes refueling stops at Rock Hill, South Carolina, Jacksonville, Florida (where Meeks requests but is denied a bottle of Scotch whisky), and Fort Lauderdale, Florida. Upon arrival in Cuba, Meeks and his girlfriend are arrested, and Stradley flies back to a hero's welcome in Gastonia.
- April 23 – At Pellston, Michigan, a hijacker takes control of North Central Airlines Flight 945, a Douglas DC-9 with four people aboard scheduled to fly to Sault Ste. Marie, Ontario, Canada, and demands to be flown to Detroit, Michigan. The hijacker is overpowered.
- April 24 – The United States begins Operation Patio, involving air strikes up to 18 miles (29 km) inside Cambodia.
- April 25
  - An Italian Air Force Fairchild C-119G Flying Boxcar suffers an engine failure during its initial climb from Rivolto Air Force Base in Codroipo, Italy, and crashes, killing 17 of the 19 people on board.
  - A hijacker commandeers a VASP Boeing 737-2A1 (registration PP-SMC) during a domestic flight in Brazil from Brasília to Manaus and forces it to fly to Guyana and then on to Cuba.
- April 26 – Lufthansa begins wide-body airliner service with a Boeing 747 flight.

=== May ===
- President Richard M. Nixon's administration announces that recent American attacks on North Vietnam, primarily targeting communications and air defense facilities, are the Vietnam War's largest since 1968.
- May 1
  - B-52 Stratofortress strikes and helicopter assaults against North Vietnamese forces are part of the first day of the American and South Vietnamese invasion of Cambodia. The last U.S. Army helicopter will not leave Cambodia until June 29.
  - Two hijackers commandeer a British West Indian Airways Boeing 727 during a flight from Kingston, Jamaica, to Grand Cayman Island in the Cayman Islands, demanding to be flown to Cuba and Algeria.
- May 2 – After several unsuccessful attempts to land at Princess Juliana International Airport on St. Maarten in the Netherlands Antilles due to poor weather, ALM Antillean Airlines Flight 980, a McDonnell Douglas DC-9-33F, runs out of fuel and ditches in the Caribbean Sea, killing 23 of the 63 people on board and injuring 37 of the 40 survivors.
- May 9
  - U.S. Navy attack helicopters are the first American aircraft to reach Phnom Penh during the American and South Vietnamese invasion of Cambodia.
  - American labor union leader and president of the United Auto Workers Walter Reuther and architect Oscar Stonorov die when their Gates Learjet 23 (registration N434J) strikes trees in poor visibility and crashes short of the runway on final approach to Pellston Regional Airport in Pellston, Michigan. Also killed are Reuther's wife, his bodyguard, and the plane's pilot and copilot.
- May 12 – Seven hijackers commandeer an ALM Antillean Airlines Fokker F27 Friendship during a flight from Santo Domingo in the Dominican Republic to Curaçao and force it to fly them to Cuba.
- May 14
  - A man without a ticket boards an Ansett Australia Douglas DC-9-31 at Sydney Airport, Australia, as it prepares for a domestic flight to Brisbane, brandishes a revolver, and demands that the airliner fly him out of Sydney. After talking to a clergyman, he surrenders; his revolver turns out to be a toy gun.
  - A hijacker seizes control of a VASP Boeing 737-200 during a domestic flight in Brazil from Brasília to Manaus and demands to be flown to Cuba. Instead the airliner diverts first to Guyana and then to Curaçao.
- May 15 – Royal Air Maroc places its first Boeing aircraft, a Boeing 727-200, in revenue service.
- May 18 – National Airlines ends a 108-day strike by offering ground crews a 33% pay increase.
- May 20 – The Tupolev Tu-144 becomes the first commercial transport to reach Mach 2.
- May 21
  - Four passengers hijack an Avianca Douglas C-47-DL Skytrain (registration HK-121) during a domestic flight in Colombia from Yopal to Sogamoso with 26 people on board and demand that it fly them to Cuba. The airliner lands at Barrancabermeja and Barranquilla, Colombia, before proceeding to Santiago de Cuba in Cuba. Not permitted to land there, it diverts to Kingston, Jamaica.
  - U.S. President Richard Nixon signs the Airport and Airway Development Act of 1970 and the Airport and Airway Revenue Act. The acts are meant to fill funding gaps in the U.S. airport and airway system, which had become inadequate due to the rapid growth of aviation, with new aviation-related excise taxes, including a tax on aviation fuels, a tax placed on tickets sold to passengers on domestic and international flights, a tax on waybills, and a new tax on aircraft registration. The new taxes are expected to provide US$11,000,000,000 to the Airport and Airway Trust Fund in order to pay for airport development, as well as "acquiring, establishing, and improving air navigational facilities."
- May 24 – A hijacker commandeers a Mexicana Boeing 727 during a domestic flight in Mexico from Mérida to Mexico City with 79 people on board, and forces it to fly to Havana, Cuba.
- May 25
  - A hijacker commandeers American Airlines Flight 206, a Boeing 727 flying from Chicago, Illinois, to New York City with 74 people on board, and forces it to fly to Havana, Cuba.
  - Over Georgia, a woman accompanied by a child hijacks Delta Air Lines Flight 199, a Convair CV-880 with 102 people on board flying from Atlanta, Georgia, to Miami, Florida, and forces it to fly to Havana, Cuba.
- May 26
  - Operation Menu, the 14-month-long covert American bombing campaign by B-52 Stratofortresses against North Vietnamese Army sanctuaries in Cambodia, comes to an end. The B-52s have flown 3,800 sorties and dropped 108,823 tons (98,723,578 kg) of munitions during the campaign.
  - The Soviet Tupolev Tu-144 exceeds Mach 2 in level flight, the first commercial aircraft to do so.
- May 29 – Plagued with maintenance problems and with its aircraft grounded since a fatal accident on March 14, the Brazilian airline Paraense Transportes Aéreos goes out of business. It had operated since March 1952.
- May 30
  - Seven hijackers commandeer an Avianca Hawker Siddeley HS 748-245 Series 2A (registration HK-1408) during a domestic flight in Colombia from Bogotá to Bucaramanga with 42 people on board and demand that it fly them to Cuba. The airliner stops at Barranquilla, Colombia, to refuel before proceeding to Havana, Cuba.
  - Lehigh Acres Development Inc. Flight 701, a Martin 4-0-4, crashes near Atlanta, Georgia, moments after departing from DeKalb–Peachtree Airport, striking a car. Aboard the plane, one passenger is killed and 30 are injured. Five people in the car die.

=== June ===
- Laos's Royal Lao Air Force receives its first Douglas AC-47 Spooky fixed-wing gunships, transferred to it from the United States Air Force under the U.S. Military Assistance Program.
- June 4 – Angry over the refusal of the United States Supreme Court to hear his case in a dispute with the U.S. Internal Revenue Service which had begun in 1963, Arthur Gates Barkley walks into the cockpit of Trans World Airlines (TWA) Flight 486 – a Boeing 727 flying from Phoenix, Arizona, to Washington National Airport in Arlingtnn, Virginia – armed with a .22-caliber pistol, a straight razor, and a can of gasoline (petrol), and threatens to set the plane and its passengers on fire if $100 million is not taken from the Supreme Court's budget and given to him, the first time that an American airline hijacker has demanded a ransom. He forces the airliner to land at Washington Dulles International Airport in Virginia, where TWA gives him $100,750 in the hope that he will accept the smaller amount. Enraged at the small amount, Barkley orders the plane to take off and sends a message of complaint addressed directly to President Richard Nixon. During the next two hours, while the plane circles the airport, Barkley makes numerous suicidal threats, and TWA turns the matter over to the Federal Bureau of Investigation (FBI), which talks Barkley into returning to the airport to collect the rest of his ransom. When the plane lands, Barkley finds the runway lined with 100 sacks supposedly containing $1 million each but actually containing scraps of paper, and an FBI sniper shoots out the plane's landing gear. A panicked passenger opens an emergency exit, and the rest of the passengers follow him out of the plane while FBI agents storm it, engage in a gun battle with Barkley in which Barkley and the copilot are wounded, ad arrest Barkley.
- June 5 – A hijacker forces a LOT Polish Airlines Antonov An-24 making a domestic flight in Poland from Szczecin to Gdańsk with 24 people on board to divert to Kastrup Airport outside Copenhagen, Denmark, and demands political asylum. Security forces storm the airliner and arrest the hijacker.
- June 6 – The commander of the U.S. Air Force's Military Airlift Command, General Jack J. Catton, accepts the first operational Lockheed C-5 Galaxy into service. The C-5 is the largest airplane in the world at the time.
- June 8 – Nine hijackers commandeer a CSA Czech Airlines Ilyushin Il-14 making a domestic flight in Czechoslovakia from Karlovy Vary to Prague and force it top fly them to Nuremberg, West Germany.
- June 9 – Two armed passengers attempt to hijack a LOT Polish Airlines airliner making a domestic flight in Poland from Katowice to Warsaw and divert it to Vienna, Austria, but they are overpowered and the flight continues to Warsaw.
- June 15 – The Soviet MVD arrests a group of 12 Soviet refuseniks at Smolny Airport outside of Leningrad before they can board a 12-seater Aeroflot Antonov An-2 for a flight to Priozersk. Pretending to be a wedding party, they had purchased all 12 tickets available for the flight and intended to hijack the plane as a means of escaping to the West.
- June 16 – National Airlines becomes the third American airline to offer transatlantic service, inaugurating daily nonstop round-trip service between Miami, Florida, and London, England.
- June 21 – Three hijackers commandeer an Iran Air Boeing 727 making a domestic flight in Iran from Tehran to Abadan with 94 people on board and force it to fly to Baghdad, Iraq.
- June 22 – A hijacker forces Pan American World Airways Flight 119, a Boeing 707 flying from Beirut, Lebanon, to Rome, Italy, with 143 people on board, to divert to Cairo, Egypt.
- June 26
  - Continental Airlines becomes the second airline (after Trans World Airlines) to offer Boeing 747 service on domestic routes in the United States.
  - Two passengers hijack an Avianca Boeing 737-159 (registration HK-1403) on a domestic flight in Colombia from Cúcuta to Bogotá with 92 people on board and demand to be flown to Cuba. The airliner makes refueling stops at Bogotá and Barranquilla, Colombia, before proceeding to Havana, Cuba.

=== July ===
- July 1
  - Melbourne, Australia, opens its new international airport.
  - Trans World Airlines becomes the first airline to offer a no-smoking section aboard every aircraft in its fleet.
  - A hijacker forces National Airlines Flight 28, a Douglas DC-8 flying from New Orleans, Louisiana, to Miami, Florida, with 39 people on board, to divert to Havana, Cuba.
  - At Rio de Janeiro, Brazil, four hijackers take control of a Cruzeiro do Sul Sud Aviation SE-210 Caravelle VIN (registration PP-PDX) with 31 people on board preparing to depart for a domestic flight to São Paulo and demand the release of prisoners and to be flown to Cuba. Security forces storm the airliner and arrest the hijackers.
- July 3
  - A Dan-Air de Havilland DH 106 Comet Series 4 crashes on the slopes of the Montseny Range near Arbúcies, Catalonia in northern Spain, killing all 112 people on board.
  - The Canadian Armed Forces decommission Canada's last aircraft carrier, HMCS Bonaventure (CVL 22), at Halifax, Nova Scotia.
- July 4 – A hijacker commandeers a Cruzeiro do Sul NAMC YS-11A-202 (registration PP-CTJ) during a domestic flight in Brazil from Belém to Macapá and forces it to fly to Cayenne in French Guiana, Georgetown in Guyana, Trinidad, Antigua, and Jamaica.
- July 5 – While landing, Air Canada Flight 621, a Douglas DC-8-63, hits the runway at Toronto International Airport in Toronto, Ontario, Canada, with such force that its number four engine and pylon break off the right wing. The pilot manages to lift off again for a go around, but a series of explosions in the right wing break off the number three engine and pylon and then destroy most of the wing before the pilot can make a second landing attempt. The plane crashes in Brampton, Ontario, killing all 109 people on board.
- July 12 – A hijacker seizes control of a Saudi Arabian Airlines Boeing 707 during a flight from Riyadh, Saudi Arabia, to Beirut, Lebanon, and forces it to fly to Damascus, Syria.
- July 17 – Louis Armstrong New Orleans International Airport commences passenger screening to help prevent hijackings, the first airport to do so.
- July 18 – A Soviet Air Force Antonov An-22 (NATO reporting name "Cock") disappears over the North Atlantic Ocean during a flight from Reykjavík, Iceland, to Sydney, Nova Scotia, Canada, with the loss of all 23 people aboard.
- July 22
  - George Hardin, a 20-year-old United States Army private who no longer wishes to fight in the Vietnam War, puts a knife to the throat of the pilot of an Air Vietnam Douglas DC-4 during a domestic flight in South Vietnam from Pleiku to Saigon and demands to be flown to Hong Kong. The pilot insists on a refueling stop at Saigon, where South Vietnamese police surround the airliner. Hardin releases all the passengers, keeping the pilot and flight engineer as hostages, but the flight engineer jumps out of a hatch onto the tarmac and escapes. After two hours of negotiations, Hardin surrenders. In August, he will escape from custody and attempt to hijack a United States Air Force C-141 Starlifter.
  - Six Palestinian commandos hijack Olympic Airways Flight 255, a Boeing 727, during a flight from Beirut, Lebanon, to Athens, Greece, demanding the immediate release of seven Arab terrorists from Greek prisons and threatening to blow up the plane if their demands are not met. The airliner lands at Athens, where its passengers are released, then flies to Cairo, Egypt.
  - West Germany and the United Kingdom sign an agreement to develop the Multi-Role Combat Aircraft as the Panavia Panther. It later will emerge as the Panavia Tornado.
- July 25 – After an Aeronaves de México Douglas DC-9-15 (registration XA-SOE) with 31 people on board takes off from Acapulco, Mexico, for a domestic flight to Mexico City, six armed members of the "Comando Unido Revolucionario Dominicana" (Dominican Revolutionary United Command) hijack it. After the airliner refuels at Mexico City, they force it to fly to Havana, Cuba.
- July 28 – A hijacker commandeers an Aerolineas Argentinas Boeing 737-287 (registration LV-JMX) with 49 people on board making a domestic flight in Argentina from Salta to Buenos Aires, demanding to be flown to Cuba. The plane lands at Córdoba, Argentina, where the hijacker surrenders.
- July 30 – The Egyptian Air Force loses five MiG fighters and their pilots in a single day of combat with the Israeli Air Force.
- July 31 – American champion bull rider George Paul is killed when the Beechcraft Twin Bonanza he is piloting crashes into a mountain slope near Kemmerer, Wyoming.

=== August ===
- August 2 – The first hijacking of a Boeing 747 takes place when 27-year old Puerto Rican nationalist Rodolfo Rivera Rios passes through a metal detector that Pan American World Airways personnel are not monitoring and boards Pan American Flight 299, a Boeing 747-121 (registration N736PA) flying from John F. Kennedy International Airport in New York City to San Juan, Puerto Rico, with 379 people on board. During the flight, he pulls out a .32-caliber pistol, a switchblade, and a bottle he claims contains nitroglycerine, demanding to be flown to Havana, Cuba. Awakened at dawn by the airliner circling Havana at an altitude of 2,000 feet (610 meters) while awaiting air traffic control instructions, President of Cuba Fidel Castro rushes to the airport to inspect the 747 – which at the time was still a novelty – but he declines an invitation to come aboard the plane, saying he does not want to "disturb the passengers." Imprisoned in Cuba until 1977, Rios returns to the United States in 1978 and is imprisoned for life.
- August 3 – A 28-year-old male passenger aboard Pan American World Airways Flight 742, a Boeing 727 flying from Munich, West Germany, to West Berlin with 125 people on board, pulls out a gun and demands to be flown to Hungary. The airliner continues to West Berlin and lands at Berlin Tempelhof Airport, where police arrest the hijacker.
- August 6 – Three minutes after takeoff from Rawalpindi, Pakistan, for a domestic flight to Lahore, a Pakistan International Airlines Fokker F27 Friendship (registration AP-ALM) crashes in a thunderstorm, killing all 30 people on board.
- August 7
  - A hijacker commandeers a LOT Polish Airlines Antonov An-24 during a domestic flight in Poland from Szczecin to Katowice and demands to be flown to West Germany. The airliner diverts to East Berlin, East Germany.
  - After over three years of fighting, a ceasefire brings the War of Attrition between Egypt and Israel to a close.
- August 8 – Three hijackers take control of a CSA Czech Airlines Ilyushin Il-14 during a domestic flight in Czechoslovakia from Prague to Bratislava and force it to fly to Vienna, Austria.
- August 9 – LANSA Flight 502, a Lockheed L-188A Electra, crashes shortly after takeoff from Quispiquilla Airport near Cusco, Peru, killing 99 of the 100 people on board and two people on the ground. It is the deadliest air accident in Peruvian history at the time.
- August 11 – George Hardin, a 20-year-old United States Army private who no longer wishes to fight in the Vietnam War and a fugitive since August 9, when he had escaped from custody in South Vietnam after being arrested in July at Saigon for hijacking an Air Vietnam airliner, boards a United States Air Force C-141 Starlifter at Bien Hoa Air Base in South Vietnam armed with an M16 rifle and orders the plane's six crewmen to fly him to Da Nang, South Vietnam. Several of the plane's crewmen overpower Hardin, his M16 firing 16 rounds into the C-141's bulkhead before they subdue him.
- August 12 – China Airlines Flight 206, a NAMC YS-11, crashes into a bamboo grove on the top of Yuan Mountain in fog during a severe thunderstorm while on approach to land at Taipei Songshan Airport in Taipei, Taiwan, killing 14 of the 31 people on board.
- August 19
  - Brandishing a toy pistol, 24-year-old Sachio Inagaki, suicidal over breaking up with his girlfriend, takes control of an All Nippon Airways Boeing 727 during a domestic flight in Japan from Nagoya to Sapporo, planning to exchange the passengers for a rifle and then to use it commit a spectacular public suicide. The airliner diverts to the Japan Air Self-Defense Force′s Hamamatsu Air Base, where 72 Japanese military security personnel surround it. After two hours of negotiations, a pregnant passenger feigns labor pains, and when Inagaki opens a door to let her off the plane, a police officer rushes aboard and overpowers and arrests him.
  - Five hijackers force a LOT Polish Airlines Ilyushin Il-14 making a domestic flight in Poland from Gdańsk to Warsaw to fly them to Bornholm, Denmark.
  - Three men armed with a handgun and hand grenades hijack Trans Caribbean Airways Flight 401, a Douglas DC-8 with 154 people on board flying from Newark, New Jersey, to San Juan, Puerto Rico, and force it to fly to Havana, Cuba. After five hours on the ground in Havana, the DC-8 flies to Miami, Florida.
- August 20 – On an unauthorized absence from the United States Marine Corps and saying he faced racist insults while undergoing Marine Corps training, 20-year-old Gregory Graves claims to have several sticks of dynamite in what is actually his empty briefcase aboard Delta Air Lines Flight 435 – a Douglas DC-9 with 82 people on board flying from Atlanta to Savannah, Georgia – and forces it to fly to Havana, Cuba, where he believes he will find racial harmony. He will be imprisoned under harsh conditions in Cuba, not finally leaving the island until 1975.
- August 24
  - Two U.S. Air Force Sikorsky HH-53C Sea Stallion helicopters complete a nine-day, seven-stop flight of 9,000 miles (14,000 km) from Eglin Air Force Base, Florida, to Da Nang, South Vietnam. The trip has included the first transpacific flight by helicopters, a 1,700-mile (2,738-km) non-stop segment on August 22 from Shemya Island in the Aleutian Islands to Misawa Air Base, Japan, with in-flight refuelling by HC-130 Hercules tanker aircraft.
  - Wearing his United States Army uniform aboard Trans World Airlines Flight 134 – a Boeing 727 with 86 people on board flying from Chicago, Illinois, to Philadelphia, Pennsylvania – 27-year-old Vietnam War veteran Robert Labadie enters the cockpit while the plane is passing over Fort Wayne, Indiana, and orders the pilot to fly him to Cuba, saying that he will signal an accomplice to detonate a bomb if the flight crew does not comply. He never says another word for the rest of the flight, and is arrested by Cuban authorities upon arrival in Havana. On September 24, Cuba will permit U.S. officials to escort Labadie from Havana back to the United States, the first time that a U.S. aircraft hijacker in Cuba is extradited in such a manner.
- August 26 – Three hijackers demand that a LOT Polish Airlines Antonov An-24 departing Katowice for Warsaw, Poland, take them to Austria.
- August 29 – An Indian Airlines Fokker F-27 Friendship 400 (registration VT-DWT) strikes a hill and crashes just after takeoff from Silchar Airport in Silchar, India, killing all 39 people on board.
- August 31 – Three passengers armed with handguns and a Molotov cocktail hijack an Air Algérie Convair CV-640 during a domestic flight in Algeria from Annaba to Algiers and demand to be flown to Albania. The airliner first lands at Cagliari on Sardinia, where the hijackers release 11 passengers. The plane then stops at Brindisi, Italy, before proceeding to Albania. After Albanian authorities refuse to let it land, the airliner diverts to Dubrovnik in the Socialist Federal Republic of Yugoslavia, where the hijackers are arrested.

=== September ===
- The Bellanca Sales Company acquires the assets of the Champion Aircraft Company, creating the Bellanca Aircraft Corporation.
- September 2 – Shortly after climbing to an altitude of 9,000 meters (30,000 feet), Aeroflot Flight 3630, a Tupolev Tu-124 (registration CCCP-45012) crashes near Dnepropetrovsk in the Soviet Union's Ukrainian Soviet Socialist Republic, killing all 37 people on board.
- September 3
  - Descending to land at Leninabad in the Soviet Union's Tajik Soviet Socialist Republic, an Aeroflot Yakovlev Yak-40 (registration CCCP-87690) crashes at an altitude of 2,100 meters (6,900 feet) into the side of 2,300-meter (7,500-foot) Mount Airy-Tash, 90 km (56 mi) northeast of Leninabad, killing all 21 people on board. At the time, it is the deadliest accident in history involving a Yak-40 and the deadliest aviation accident in the history of Tajikistan.
  - Air France places the first orders for the Airbus A300
- September 6
  - Members of the Popular Front for the Liberation of Palestine (PFLP) hijack three airliners bound for New York City. The hijackings of Trans World Airlines Flight 741 – a Boeing 707 flying from Frankfurt-am-Main, West Germany, with 155 people on board including Rabbi Yitzchak Hutner – and Swissair Flight 100 – a Douglas DC-8 with 155 passengers on board flying from Zurich-Kloten Airport in Switzerland – proceed without injury to anyone, and the airliners are flown to Dawson's Field, an abandoned former Royal Air Force airstrip in a remote desert area of Jordan near Zarka. The hijacking of El Al Flight 219, a Boeing 707 with 158 people on board, fails when hijacker Patrick Argüello is shot and killed after injuring one crew member and his partner Leila Khaled is subdued and turned over to British authorities in London; two other PFLP members prevented from boarding El Al Flight 219 instead hijack Pan American World Airways Flight 93, a Boeing 747 flying from Brussels, Belgium, and Amsterdam, the Netherlands, with 153 people on board, which they force to fly to Beirut, Lebanon, and then on to Cairo, Egypt.
  - Flying the Catbird, a radio-controlled model airplane of his own design, Maynard L. Hill sets a new world record recognized by the Fédération Aéronautique Internationale for gain in altitude by a radio-controlled airplane. Launched by hand from the Naval Weapons Laboratory airfield at Dahlgren, Virginia, Catbird climbs for 43 minutes and reaches an altitude of 8,205 meters (26,919 feet) before returning to earth in a 20-minute dive and landing 10 meters (33 feet) from its launch point.
- September 8 – While a Trans International Airlines Douglas DC-8 (registration N8963T) taxis at John F. Kennedy International Airport in New York City for a ferry flight to Washington Dulles International Airport in Fairfax County, Virginia, with eight flight attendants and three cockpit crew members on board, a foreign object becomes wedged between the right elevator and horizontal stabilizer, blown there by backwash from the aircraft preceding it on the taxiway. The problem is not detected, and the aircraft crashes upon takeoff, killing all 11 people on board; it is Trans International's only fatal accident. The accident prompts the U.S. Federal Aviation Administration to institute new minimum distances between aircraft in line-up for take-off.
- September 9 – To pressure British authorities into releasing Leila Khaled, a PFLP sympathizer hijacks BOAC Flight 775, a Vickers VC10 flying from Bahrain to Beirut with 114 people on board, and forces it to land at Dawson's Field in Jordan.
- September 10 – Three hijackers seize control of n Egyptian airliner scheduled to fly from Beirut, Lebanon, to Cairo, Egypt, but are subdued.
- September 11 – U.S. President Richard Nixon orders the immediate deployment of armed federal agents aboard U.S. commercial aircraft to combat hijackings.
- September 12
  - After removing all hostages from them, PFLP members use explosives to destroy the four empty airliners at Dawson's Creek and Cairo hijacked on September 6 and 9. By September 30, all hostages from the four planes will be recovered unharmed.
  - A hijacker commandeers an Egyptian airliner scheduled to fly from Tripoli, Libya, to Cairo, Egypt, but is subdued.
- September 14
  - Six hijackers aboard a TAROM BAC One-Eleven flying from Bucharest, Romania, to Prague, Czechoslovakia, with 89 people on board force it to divert to Munich, West Germany.
  - Over Salinas, California, Donald Irwin, armed with a starting pistol, hijacks Trans World Airlines Flight 15, a Boeing 707 flying from Los Angeles to San Francisco, California, with 63 people on board, demanding to be flown to North Korea. The pilot convinces him that the airliner needs to stop at San Francisco to refuel. After the plane lands at San Francisco International Airport, Irwin releases 35 passengers. Brink's security guard Robert DeNisco, aboard the airliner as a passenger to protect a shipment of cash the plane is carrying, then draws a .38-caliber handgun and shoots Irwin in the stomach. The wounded Irwin is arrested.
- September 16 – Armed with a gun and a dagger, a passenger hijacks a United Arab Airlines Antonov An-24 during a domestic flight in Egypt from Luxor to Cairo and demands to be flown to Saudi Arabia. A security guard aboard the plane overpowers him.
- September 19 – Shortly after Allegheny Airlines Flight 730 – a Boeing 727 with 98 people on board – takes off from Pittsburgh, Pennsylvania, for a flight to Boston, Massachusetts, 19-year-old Richard Witt, puts a gun to the throat of a stewardess and demands to be flown to Cairo, Egypt, claiming he has a homemade bomb and a bottle of nitroglycerine and saying he is a Marxist who hates Jews and wants to help Palestinian guerrillas fight them. The airliner lands at Philadelphia, Pennsylvania, where Witt releases its 90 passengers – among them professional wrestler Charlie "Professor Toru Tanaka" Kalani Jr. – and the flight crew talks him out of going to Cairo because the plane lacks the range and flight charts needed to get there. Witt decides he wants to go to Havana, Cuba, instead. During the one-hour stop in Philadelphia, police smuggle a gun to the flight crew, but they decline to use it for fear that Witt will shoot the stewardess or detonate his bomb. The plane takes off and flies to Havana, where Witt disembarks and is imprisoned by Cuban authorities. The airliner then flies to Miami, Florida. Witt will return to the United States in 1978.
- September 22 – A hijacker aboard Eastern Airlines Flight 945 – a Douglas DC-8 flying from Boston, Massachusetts, to San Juan, Puerto Rico – demands that the airliner fly to Cuba, but the plane lands at San Juan.

=== October ===
- In its Supplementary Statement on Defence Policy, the new British Conservative government only partially reverses the preceding Labour government's plans to phase out all Royal Navy aircraft carriers by the end of 1971, instead rescheduling the decommissioning of HMS Eagle for 1972 and of HMS Ark Royal for the late 1970s, with the Royal Navy to have no large, fixed-wing aircraft carriers after Ark Royal″s retirement.
- Trans European Airways is founded. It will begin operations during 1971.
- October 2
  - Shortly after takeoff from Sung Shan Airport in Taipei, Taiwan, a United States Air Force Lockheed C-130E Hercules crashes near a 700-foot (210-meter) hill 13 miles (21 km) southwest of Taipei, killing all 43 people on board. Its wreckage is not discovered until October 8.
  - National Airlines begins the first Boeing 747 service to or from Miami, Florida, offering flights between Miami and New York City
  - A Golden Eagle Aviation Martin 4-0-4 carrying the starting players, coaches, and boosters of the Wichita State University football team crashes on a mountain west of Silver Plume, Colorado, killing 31 of the 40 people on board.
- October 4 – American stock car racing driver Curtis Turner is one of two people killed when the Aero Commander 500 he is piloting crashes near Mahaffey, Pennsylvania.
- October 10 – Three hijackers aboard an Iran Air Boeing 727 on a domestic flight in Iran from Tehran to Abadan with 52 people on board force it to land at Baghdad International Airport in Baghdad, Iraq, where they threaten to blow up the airliner unless 21 political prisoners are released. They eventually surrender.
- October 15 – The first successful aircraft hijacking in the Soviet Union takes place, when the Lithuanian nationalist Pranas Brazinskas and his son Algirdas seize Aeroflot Flight 244, an Antonov An-24, over the Soviet Union after a shoot-out on board with guards in which flight attendant Nadezhda Kurchenko is killed while trying to block them from entering the cockpit and several other crew members are wounded. The hijackers force the plane to fly to Trabzon, Turkey, where they surrender to Turkish authorities. The Soviet government later will present Kurchenko with the Order of the Red Banner posthumously.
- October 19 – Hindustan Aeronautics completes its first licence-built MiG-21
- October 21
  - An explosion in the lavatory blows the tail off of Philippine Airlines Flight 215, a Hawker Siddeley HS 748-209 Series 2, while it is flying over the Philippine Islands at 10,500 feet (3,200 m) during a flight from Cauayan, Isabela, to Manila; the aircraft crashes, killing all 40 people on board. A bomb is suspected.
  - Seven hijackers commandeer a LACSA Curtiss C-46 Commando during a domestic flight in Costa Rica from Puerto Limón to San José and force it fly them to San Andrés, Cuba.
- October 25 – National Airlines expands Boeing 747 service at Miami, introducing flights to Los Angeles, California.
- October 27 – Two hijackers commandeer an Aeroflot Ilyushin Il-14 during a domestic flight in the Soviet Union from Kerch to Sevastopol and force it fly them to Sinop, Turkey.
- October 28 – The U.S. Air Force completes Operation Fig Hill, an airlift begun on September 27 to bring medical personnel, equipment, and supplies to Jordan in the aftermath of combat between the country's armed forces and the Palestine Liberation Organization. During the airlift, transport aircraft have delivered 200 medical personnel, two field hospitals, and 186 short tons (169 metric tons) of supplies, equipment, vehicles, tents, and food.

=== November ===
- The Israeli Air Force has lost 20 fighters in combat with Egyptian forces since June thanks to the Egyptian deployment of S-125 Neva/Pechora (NATO reporting name "SA-3 Goa") surface-to-air missiles and MiG-21J (NATO reporting name "Fishbed") fighters.
- November 1
  - Trans World Airlines introduces "Business Class Ambassador Service" featuring "twin-seat" accommodations on transcontinental flights in the United States, marketing the new service as "a whole new way to fly."
  - Three hijackers commandeer United Airlines Flight 598, a Boeing 727 flying from San Diego to Los Angeles, California, with 71 people on board, and demand to be flown to Cuba. The airliner stops at Tijuana, Mexico, before proceeding to Cuba.
- November 9 – Nine hijackers take control of a Douglas DC-3 airliner flying from Dubai in the Trucial States to Bandar Abbas, Iran, demanding to be flown to Iraq. The airliner stops at Doha, Qatar, before proceeding to Baghdad, Iraq.
- November 10 – A hijacker commandeers a Saudi Arabian Airlines Douglas DC-3 flying from Amman, Jordan, to Riyadh, Saudi Arabia, and forces it to divert to Damascus, Syria.
- November 11 – The British government agrees to fund development of the Rolls-Royce RB211 turbofan, rescuing the project from Rolls-Royce's bankruptcy.
- November 12–13 (overnight) – The 1970 Bhola cyclone strikes East Pakistan, submerging the airports at Chittagong and Cox's Bazar under 1 meter (3.3 feet) of water for several hours.
- November 13
  - A husband and wife carrying 3 liters (3.2 U.S. quarts; 2.6 Imperial quarts) of gasoline (petrol) and 5 liters (5.3 U.S. quarts; 4.4 Imperial quarts) of kerosene hijack an Aeroflot Ilyushin Il-14M 20 minutes after takeoff from Kaunas for a domestic flight in the Soviet Union to Palanga with 42 people on board. They pour the gasoline and kerosene on the floor of the cabin and cockpit and threaten to ignite it if the airliner does not fly them to Gotland, Sweden. The flight crew overpowers them and the airliner lands safely at Palanga.
  - A hijacker commandeers Eastern Airlines Flight 257, a Douglas DC-9 departing from Raleigh–Durham International Airport in North Carolina with 81 people on board, and demands that it fly him to Cuba. The airliner stops at Jacksonville, Florida, before proceeding to Cuba.
- November 14 – Southern Airways Flight 932, a Douglas DC-9, crashes near Ceredo, West Virginia, killing all 75 on board. Among the dead are 37 members of the Marshall University football team, eight of its coaches, 25 team boosters, and the crew of five.
- November 21
  - In Operation Ivory Coast, the U.S. Air Force and U.S. Army assault the North Vietnamese prison camp at Son Tay, North Vietnam, to free prisoners-of-war thought to be there, supported by 59 U.S. Navy and 57 U.S. Air Force aircraft, 28 of them directly assigned to the immediate assault area. No prisoners are found at the camp, but the attackers kill 42 North Vietnamese guards in exchange for two Americans injured and one HH-3E Jolly Green helicopter deliberately crash-landed in the prison courtyard and left behind. Large air raids are conducted over the night of November 20–21 to divert North Vietnamese attention from the assault, including the largest U.S. Navy night aircraft carrier operation of the Vietnam War; one U.S. Air Force F-105 Thunderchief is shot down during these raids, but its crew ejects safely.
  - American aircraft begin the first major bombing campaign over North Vietnam since 1968, as 300 aircraft attack the Mu Gia and Ban Gari passes.
- November 27
  - Benjamín Mendoza y Amor Flores lunges at Pope Paul VI with a dagger at Manila International Airport outside of Manila in the Philippines shortly after the Pope disembarks from a chartered Douglas DC-8. The Pope suffers minor injuries.
  - During a flight over South Vietnam from Tan Son Nhut Air Base to Nha Trang Air Base in poor visibility, a United States Air Force C-123K Provider strikes trees on a 5,100-foot (1,600-meter) ridge at an elevation of 4,600 feet (1,400 meters) and crashes, killing all 79 people on board. Its wreckage is not found until December 6.
  - Capitol Airways Flight 3/26, a Douglas DC-8-63-CF (registration N4909C) chartered by the U.S. Air Force's Military Airlift Command, fails to become airborne while attempting to take off from Anchorage International Airport in Anchorage, Alaska, because of a failure of all main landing gear wheels to rotate. It overruns the runway, strikes a wooden barrier, an Instrument Landing System structure, and a 12-foot (3.7-meter) deep drainage ditch, and catches fire, killing 47 of the 229 people on board.
- November 29 – Carrying troops, a U.S. Air Force C-123K Provider descending in thick cloud on approach to Cam Ranh Airport in South Vietnam strikes high ground at an altitude of 2,700 feet (820 meters) and crashes into the jungle, killing 42 of the 44 people on board.

=== December ===
- December 5 – The Venezuelan Air Force moves its headquarters to Generalissimo Francisco de Miranda Air Base in Caracas, Venezuela.
- December 7 – During a flight from Tel Aviv, Israel, to Bucharest, Romania, a TAROM BAC One-Eleven 424EU attempts to divert to Constanta, Romania. On approach to Mihail Kogălniceanu International Airport outside of Constanta in thickening fog, the airliner flies into the ground 5 km (3.1 mi) short of the runway, killing 19 of the 27 people on board.
- December 10 – A hijacker attempts to take control of a CSA Czech Airlines airliner during a domestic flight in Czechoslovakia from Bratislava to Brno, but is subdued.
- December 15 – Soviet aircraft designer Artem Mikoyan dies, aged 65.
- December 16
  - U.S. Air Force C-130 Hercules and C-141 Starlifter transports complete an airlift begun November 18 to bring relief supplies and equipment to East Pakistan after the devastating 1970 Bhola cyclone. The aircraft have delivered a total of 140 short tons (127 metric tons) of supplies and equipment, some of them making flights of almost 10,000 miles (16,000 km).
  - The Hague Hijacking Convention, formally the "Convention for the Suppression of Unlawful Seizure of Aircraft," is adopted by the International Conference on Air Law at The Hague in the Netherlands. It requires signatory countries to prohibit and punish the hijacking of civilian aircraft in situations in which an aircraft takes off or lands in a place different from its country of registration. It also establishes the principle of aut dedere aut judicare, which holds that a party to the convention must prosecute an aircraft hijacker if no other state requests his or her extradition for prosecution of the same crime. It will go into effect on October 14, 1971.
- December 19
  - Forty minutes after a Soviet Air Force Antonov An-22 (NATO reporting name "Cock") (registration CCCP-09305) takes off from Dacca, East Pakistan, one of its propellers disintegrates at an altitude of 6,000 meters (20,000 feet). Its crew initiates an emergency descent and attempts an emergency landing at Panagarh Airport in Panagarh, India, but cannot get the landing gear or flaps down. After flying down the runway for 2,000 meters (6,600 feet) at an altitude of 1 meter (3.3 feet), the An-22 banks right, its right wing strikes the ground, and it crashes, breaks up, and catches fire. All 17 people on board die.
  - As Continental Airlines Flight 144 – a Douglas DC-9 with 30 people on board making a flight from Denver, Colorado, to Wichita, Kansas – is flying somewhere between Tulsa, Oklahoma, and Wichita, passenger Calos Denis passes a note to a stewardess indicating that he has a gun and wants to be flown to Cuba. When the captain asks if the passengers can disembark during a refueling stop at Tulsa, Denis agrees. After the other 26 passengers disembark at Tulsa International Airport, the crew sneaks off the plane while Denis uses the lavatory. Tulsa police then board the airliner, find Denis hiding in the lavatory, and arrest him. He turns out to be unarmed.
- December 21 – A hijacker commandeers Prinair Flight 157, a de Havilland DH.114 Heron with 21 people on board, during a flight in Puerto Rico from San Juan to Ponce and demands to be flown to Mexico. He is overpowered.
- December 30 – The Grumman YF-14A, prototype of the F-14 Tomcat, is destroyed in a crash during its second flight due to hydraulic failure. Its two-man crew ejects and parachutes safely.
- December 31
  - After the pilot of a chartered Rousseau Aviation Nord 262E carrying the Air Liquide football (soccer) team from Algiers, Algeria, to Menorca in Spain's Balearic Islands for a New Year's Day match sends out a distress call about 90 km (56 mi) from Algiers, the aircraft disappears over the Mediterranean Sea with the loss of all 30 people on board.
  - With pre-tax losses of $130 million, the year ends as the worst ever for U.S. airlines.

== First flights ==
- Cessna 340

=== January ===
- January 17 Sukhoi T-6-2IG (prototype of Sukhoi Su-24 'Fencer')

=== February ===
- February 19 - Canadair CL-84 Dynavert CX8401

=== March ===
- 19 March - Martin Marietta X-24A (first powered flight)

=== May ===
- Spencer S-12 Air Car
- May 20 - Civil Aviation Department Revathi Mark 2 VT-SAH
- May 28 - Boeing Vertol Model 347
- May 28 - Meridionali/Agusta EMA 124 I-EMAF

=== June ===
- June 10 – Cessna Turbo Star 402
- June 12 - Beechcraft Model 16 N9716Q

=== July ===
- July 2 - Saab SK37 Viggen
- July 16 - Aérospatiale Corvette F-WRSN
- July 18 - Aeritalia G.222

=== August ===
- August 1 - Beck-Mahoney Sorceress
- August 20 - Sikorsky S-67 Blackhawk
- August 21 - American Aviation AA-5 Traveler
- August 22 - Aermacchi MB-326K
- August 29 - McDonnell Douglas DC-10 N10DC

=== September ===
- September 3 - Mace-Trefethen R-2
- September 11 - Britten-Norman Trislander G-ATWU

=== November ===
- November 8 - Pöschel Equator
- November 12 - Nihon XC-1
- November 14 - Aerosport Rail N43344
- November 16 - Lockheed L-1011 N1011

=== December ===
- December 1 - Dassault Falcon 10
- December 20 or 21 – Grumman YF-14A, prototype of the F-14 Tomcat

== Entered service ==
- American Champion Decathlon
- Antonov An-26 ("Curl")
- Beck-Mahoney Sorceress
- Nanchang Q-5 with Chinese People's Liberation Army
- Sukhoi Su-17 (NATO reporting name "Fitter-C") with the Soviet Air Forces

=== January ===
- January 22 – Boeing 747 with Pan American World Airways and Transworld Airlines

=== June ===
- June 6 – Lockheed C-5 Galaxy with the U.S. Air Force' Military Airlift Command

=== September ===
- Beechcraft King Air Model C90

=== October ===
- October 2 – Bell UH-1N Iroquois "Twin Huey" with the United States Air Force's Special Operations Center at Hurlburt Field, Florida

== Retired from service ==
- Martin VC-3A by the United States Navy
- January 31 – Convair B-58 Hustler by the United States Air Force
- July 17 – Northrop HL-10 by the NASA Flight Research Center

== Deadliest crash ==
The deadliest crash of this year was Dan-Air Flight 1903, a De Havilland Comet which crashed in mountainous terrain near Barcelona, Spain on 3 July, killing all 112 people on board.
