= Kurchenko =

Kurchenko (Ukrainian: Курченко) is a gender-neutral Ukrainian surname. It may refer to:

- Andrii Kurchenko (born 1965), Ukrainian physician
- Nadezhda Kurchenko (1950–1970), Soviet flight attendant involved in the hijacking of Aeroflot Flight 244
  - 2349 Kurchenko, a main-belt asteroid named after Nadezhda Kurchenko
- Serhiy Kurchenko (born 1985), Ukrainian businessman
- Viktor Kurchenko (born 1965), Ukrainian archer
