= Aeroflot Flight 7502 =

1979 aviation incident in the Soviet Union

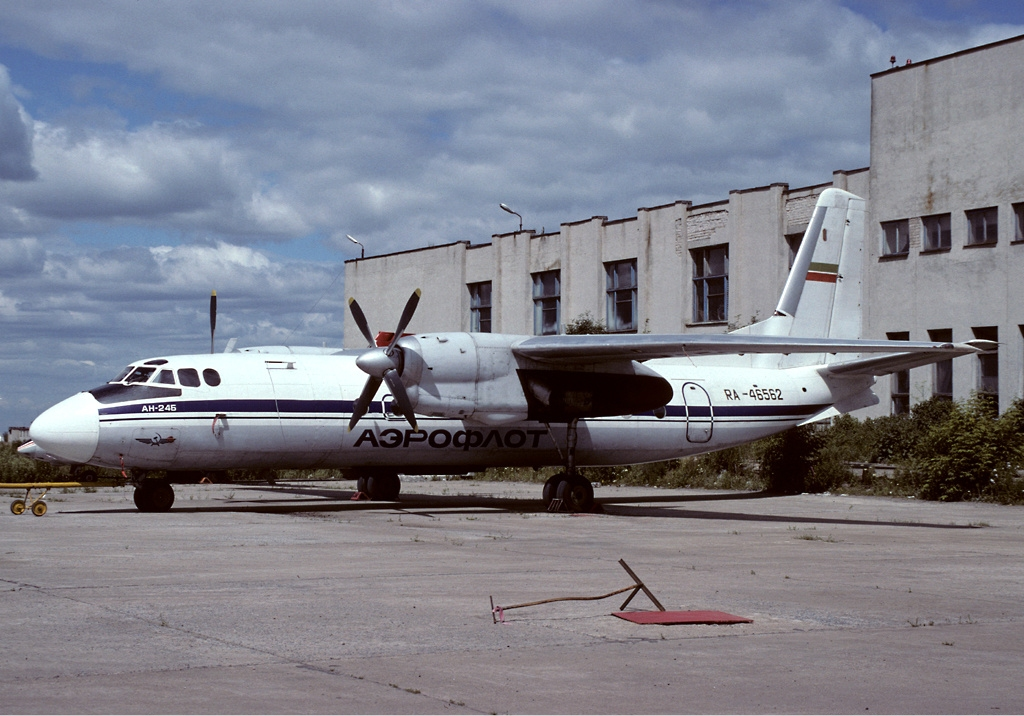
- An Aeroflot Antonov An-24B similar to the incident aircraft

Accident
- Date: 15 January 1979; 47 years ago
- Summary: Loss of control during approach due to atmospheric icing
- Site: near Minsk-1 Airport, Minsk, Byelorussian SSR

Aircraft
- Aircraft type: Antonov An-24B
- Operator: Dnipropetrovsk OJSC, part of Aeroflot
- Registration: CCCP-46807
- Flight origin: Tallinn Airport, Tallinn, Estonian SSR
- Stopover: Minsk-1 Airport, Minsk, Byelorussian SSR
- Destination: Dnipro International Airport, Dnepropetrovsk, Ukrainian SSR
- Occupants: 14
- Passengers: 9
- Crew: 5
- Fatalities: 13
- Injuries: 1
- Survivors: 1

Aeroflot Flight 7502 was a scheduled passenger flight from Tallinn, Estonian SSR, to Dnepropetrovsk, Ukrainian SSR, with a stop at Minsk, Byelorussian SSR. On 15 January 1979, an An-24B operated by a subsidiary of Aeroflot entered a stall during approach to Minsk-1 Airport and plummeted into a field between the villages of Medvezhino and Baranovshchina in the Frunzensky District of Minsk. Of the 14 individuals on board, only one survived.

== Background ==
=== Aircraft ===
The aircraft involved was an Antonov An-24, manufactured in 1965 and registered as CCCP-46807. Before the accident, it had acquired 23,844 flight hours and 17627 cycles.

The plane had appeared in the 1973 Soviet film "Абитуриентка" (High School Graduate) about the death of flight attendant Nadezhda Kurchenko during the 1970 hijacking of Aeroflot Flight 244.

=== Crew ===
- Captain: Goryanoy Vasily Antonovich,
- Co-pilot: Lyakhovich Grigory Ivanovich,
- Navigator: Avramenko Vladimir Nikolaevich,
- Flight mechanic: Fedorenko Vladimir Vladislavovich,
- Flight attendant: Tsekalo Lidiya Mikhailovna

== Accident ==
The aircraft departed from Tallinn Airport at 11:14 and reached a cruising altitude of 4,500 metres (14,800 ft). At 12:42, the crew transferred control to the Minsk Air Traffic Control Center and, at 12:49, they began descending to an altitude of 3,000 metres (9,800 ft). At 12:54, the crew contacted the approach controller and began descending to 2,100 metres (6,900 ft), and then to 1,200 metres (3,900 ft) at 12:58. At 12:59, the crew established altimeter setting; at 13:01, they descended to the circuit altitude of 400 metres (1,300 ft).

At 13:03, the captain contacted the air traffic controller and reported, "Entered glide path, landing gear down, ready for landing", and the air traffic controller cleared the aircraft for landing. Around 13:05, the aircraft, traveling at 130 kilometres per hour (81 mph; 70 kn) and descending at 15 metres per second (49 ft/s), crashed between the villages of Medvezhino and Baranovshchina into a snow-covered clay pit 15 metres (49 ft) deep. The aircraft skidded and disintegrating for another 14 metres (46 ft) before came to a stop. The debris was scattered over a distance of 30 metres (98 ft), but no fire occurred.

Emergency services arrived and found three passengers with signs of life among the dead bodies. Two of them—a man and a woman—were in critical condition and later died in the hospital. The sole survivor was three-year-old Vika Bendeberya. She was thrown from the cabin into a snowdrift, completely clogged with snow. A resident of the village of Baranovshchina found her.

It is stated that "the passengers died as a result of multiple fractures of the skeleton, rupture of internal organs, traumatic shock. The crew was in their seats, the passengers were in the front rows of seats."

== Investigation ==
During the examination, investigators discovered ice from the wing and tail. The ice was formed due to the shutdown of the anti-icing systems when the plane was still in cloud cover. This resulted in a reduce of aircraft longitudinal stability. Near the airport, at an altitude of 300 metres (980 ft) at an airspeed of 220 kilometres per hour (140 mph; 120 kn) with flaps extended to 38°, the crew were informed that they're were off-course and was below the glide path. This prompted them to increase the thrust, but it reduced the elevators' effect, stalling the stablizers. Consequently, according to the flight manual, the crew retracted the flaps to 10° and reduced the engine power to idle. Eighteen seconds before impact, the plane reached to a critical angle of attack and the speed kept dropping. The situation was no longer recoverable.

The main cause of the accident was concluded to be a partial loss of longitudinal stability of the aircraft in the landing configuration with flaps extended to 38°, combined with the stabilizer frozen due to premature disengagement of the anti-icing systems.

== See also ==
- List of aviation accidents and incidents with a sole survivor
