= 2349 Kurchenko =

Minor planet

Discovery
- Discovered by: T. Smirnova
- Discovery site: Crimean Astrophysical Obs.
- Discovery date: 30 July 1970

Designations
- Named after: Nadezhda Kurchenko (Soviet flight attendant)
- Alternative designations: 1970 OG · 1957 WM_{1} 1969 LC · 1979 NA
- Minor planet category: main-belt · (middle) background

Orbital characteristics
- Epoch 23 March 2018 (JD 2458200.5)
- Uncertainty parameter 0
- Observation arc: 60.00 yr (21,915 d)
- Aphelion: 3.1010 AU
- Perihelion: 2.4365 AU
- Semi-major axis: 2.7687 AU
- Eccentricity: 0.1200
- Orbital period (sidereal): 4.61 yr (1,683 d)
- Mean anomaly: 91.267°
- Mean motion: 0° 12^{m} 50.04^{s} / day
- Inclination: 17.486°
- Longitude of ascending node: 133.13°
- Argument of perihelion: 218.41°

Physical characteristics
- Mean diameter: 18.801±0.264 km 18.802±0.152 km 20.83±0.70 km 24.69±7.53 km 27.34 km (calculated)
- Synodic rotation period: 8.622±0.0027 h
- Geometric albedo: 0.057 (assumed); 0.071±0.005; 0.10±0.09; 0.1666±0.0454; 0.206±0.042
- Spectral type: SMASS = Xc; C (assumed)
- Absolute magnitude (H): 11.094±0.001 (R); 11.2 · 11.33±0.56; 11.4 · 11.54 · 11.56; 11.90

2349 Kurchenko, provisional designation 1970 OG, is a background asteroid from the central regions of the asteroid belt, approximately 24 kilometers (15 miles) in diameter. It was discovered on 30 July 1970, by Russian astronomer Tamara Smirnova at the Crimean Astrophysical Observatory in Nauchnij, on the Crimean peninsula. It was named for Soviet flight attendant Nadezhda Kurchenko who was killed during an airline hijacking in 1970. The asteroid has a rotation period of 8.6 hours and possibly a spherical shape.

== Orbit and classification ==
Kurchenko is a non-family asteroid from the main belt's background population. It orbits the Sun in the central asteroid belt at a distance of 2.4–3.1 AU once every 4 years and 7 months (1,683 days; semi-major axis of 2.77 AU). Its orbit has an eccentricity of 0.12 and an inclination of 17° with respect to the ecliptic. The body's observation arc begins with its observation as 1957 WM_{1} at Goethe Link Observatory in November 1957, almost 13 years prior to its official discovery observation at Nauchnij.

Occultation

On 19 October 2008, the asteroid occulted the star TYC 0160-01337-1. All five observers reported a negative result.

== Physical characteristics ==
In the SMASS classification, Kurchenko is an Xc-subtype that transitions between the X-type and the carbonaceous C-type asteroids. It is also an assumed C-type.

=== Rotation period ===
In April 2010, a rotational lightcurve of Kurchenko was obtained from photometric observations the R-band by astronomers at the Palomar Transient Factory in California. Lightcurve analysis gave a rotation period of 8.622 hours with a low brightness amplitude of 0.06 magnitude, indicative for a spherical shape (U=2).

=== Diameter and albedo ===
According to the surveys carried out by the Japanese Akari satellite and the NEOWISE mission of NASA's Wide-field Infrared Survey Explorer, Kurchenko measures between 18.801 and 24.69 kilometers in diameter and its surface has an albedo between 0.071 and 0.206.

The Collaborative Asteroid Lightcurve Link assumes a standard albedo for a carbonaceous asteroid of 0.057 and calculates a diameter of 27.34 kilometers based on an absolute magnitude of 11.54.

== Naming ==
This minor planet was named after Nadezhda Kurchenko (1950–1970), a Soviet flight attendant who was killed during the hijacking of Aeroflot Flight 244 on 15 October 1970. The official naming citation was published by the Minor Planet Center on 8 February 1982 (M.P.C. 6648).
