= Mace-Trefethen R-2 =

R-2 "Shark"

General information
- Type: Racing aircraft
- National origin: United States
- Designer: Harvey F. Mace

History
- First flight: 3 September 1970

The Mace-Trefethen R-2 Shark is an American single place racing aircraft designed in the 1970s.

== Design and development ==
The R-2 is a single seat, low-wing aircraft with conventional landing gear. The wooden construction aircraft features an elliptical wing.

== Operational history ==
At the 1970 Reno Air Races Mace achieved a speed of 198.53 mph (319.50 km/h)

== Specifications (R-2 Shark) ==
Data from Air Trails

General characteristics

- Crew: 1
- Length: 18 ft 6 in (5.64 m)
- Wingspan: 16 ft (4.9 m)
- Height: 4 ft 3 in (1.30 m)
- Wing area: 70 sq ft (6.5 m^{2})
- Airfoil: NACA 23010
- Empty weight: 540 lb (245 kg)
- Gross weight: 800 lb (363 kg)
- Powerplant: 1 × Continental O-200 horizontally opposed piston aircraft engine, 100 hp (75 kW)
- Propellers: 2-bladed

Performance

- Maximum speed: 213 kn (245 mph, 394 km/h)
- Range: 170 nmi (200 mi, 320 km)
