= Andrii Kurchenko =

Ukrainian dermatologist, immunologist and allergologist (born 1965)

Kurchenko Andrii Ihorovych
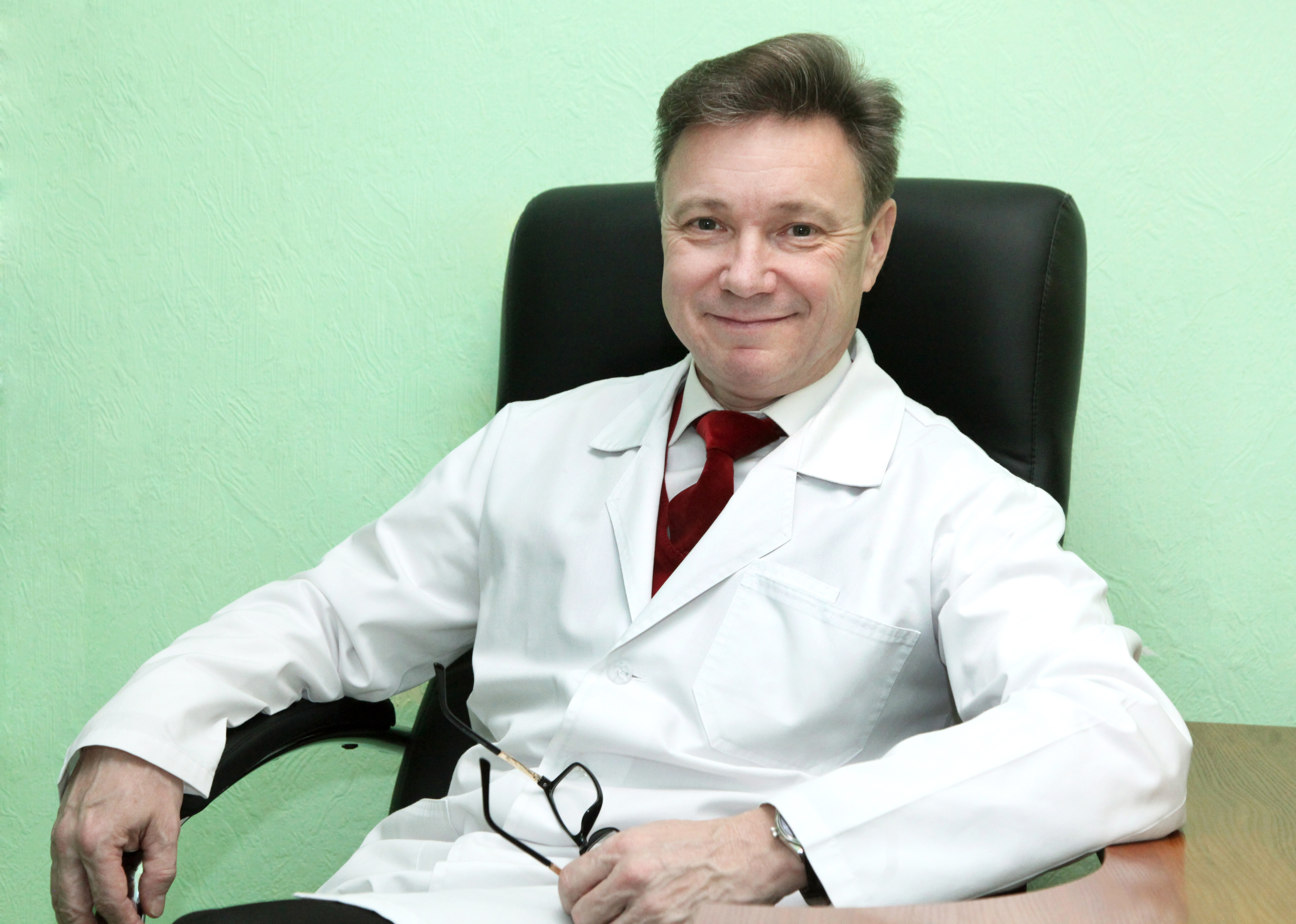
- Born: Курченко Андрій Ігорович; 29 January 1965 (age 61); Chernivtsi, Ukraine
- Citizenship: Ukraine
- Education: Chernivtsi Medical Institute
- Scientific career
- Fields: Dermatology, immunology, allergology
- Workplaces: Bogomolets National Medical University. Head of department of Clinical Immunology and Allergology with a section of medical genetics
- Thesis: Atopic dermatitis: characteristics of changes in systemic and local immunity (in Ukrainian) (2008)
- Doctoral advisor: Georgii Drannik

Andrii Ihorovych Kurchenko (Ukrainian: Андрій Курченко; born 29 January 1965, Chernivtsi city, Ukraine) is a Ukrainian dermatologist, immunologist and allergologist, Doctor of Sciences in Medicine, Professor, head of department of Clinical Immunology and Allergology at O.Bohomolets National Medical University. He is an Expert of the Scientific and Expert Council at the State Expert Center of the Ministry of Health of Ukraine, a Fellow of the European and American Academies of Allergology and Clinical Immunology and Vice-President of the Ukrainian Society of experts in Immunology, Allergology and Immune rehabilitation (UTIAI). He is Deputy-editor of the journal "Immunology and Allergology. Science and Practice", as well as a co-author of the national textbooks "Clinical and Laboratory Immunology" (2012) and "Immunology" (2013).

== Biography ==
Andrii I.Kurchenko was born on 29 January 1965 into the family of a physician in Chernivtsi city, Ukraine.

In 1982, he finished a high school with honors and entered Chernivtsi Medical Institute in specialty "General Medicine", which he graduated from with distinction in 1988. When a student, he became interested in dermatology.

From 1988 to 1990, he studied in clinical residency, and from 1990 to 1993, he continued his full-time postgraduate study at the Department of Skin and Venereal Diseases at Kyiv State Institute for Advanced Medical Education (KDIUL). In those years, the Department was headed by an outstanding Soviet dermatovenerologist, a founder of the Ukrainian School of Dermatovenereology, Professor Glukhenky Boris (1925–2015). As from the 1970s, the Department began to develop the direction of immunodermatology, which became the main one by the end of 1980s.

In 1993, under the guidance of Professors B.T. Glukhenky and pathologist V.P. Silchenko Andrii I. Kurchenko defended his MD thesis: "The role of cell-mediated immunity in the pathogenesis of eczema and the method of immunocorrective therapy in patients.

From 1993 to 1997, he worked at the Department of Skin and Venereal Diseases, first as an Assistant, and later as a Senior Research Associate at the Center for scientific research (KDIUL).

In 1996 he did an internship in the United Kingdom.

Since 1997 he was an Assistant Professor, and since 2005 he was an Associate Professor of the Department of Clinical Immunology and Allergology with the Section of Medical Genetics at Bogomolets National Medical University.

In 2008 he defended his doctoral thesis "Atopic dermatitis: characteristics of changes in systemic and local immunity" (Academic adviser is Professor Georgii Drannik).

In 2012, he was elected for the position of the head of department of Clinical Immunology and Allergology with the Section of Medical Genetics at O. Bohomolets National Medical University.

In 2014, Andrii I. Kurchenko was conferred the academic title of professor.

== Academic career ==
The subject-matter of Professor Kurchenko's research studies include: immunology of mucous membranes and skin, immunodermatology, allergology and molecular genetics.

He obtained the highest professional qualification grades in specialties of clinical immunology and allergology, as well as qualification certificates in specialties of dermatovenereology, genetics and health care organization.

He is a Fellow of two specialized Scientific Councils in Immunology and Allergology.

Since 2011 he has been Vice-President of the Ukrainian Society of specialists for Immunology, Allergology and Immunorehabilitation (UTIAI).

Since 2012 he has been an expert of the Scientific and Expert Council at the State Expert Center attached to the Ministry of Health of Ukraine.

Since 2013 he has been a member of the Medical Expert Board at the Ministry of Health of Ukraine on Allergology, Immunology, Clinical and Laboratory Immunology.

He took part in the development of health care standards (the unified medical treatment protocols) for atopic dermatitis, common variable immunodeficiency, phagocyte myeloperoxidase deficiency, medicamentous allergy, anaphylaxis included, and herpetic infection.

He is a Physician Consultant of the highest qualification grade on clinical immunology and allergology at the Heart Institute attached to the Ministry of Health of Ukraine.

From 2012 to 2014, he was the head of the Postgraduate Department and since 2015 he has been the chairman of Approbation Council "Theoretical Medicine" and a member of the Academic Coordinating Council at O. Bohomolets National Medical University.

Between 2015 and 2017, Professor Kurchenko led the scientific research work to study the clinical, immunological and genetic features in the diagnosis and treatment of diseases associated with the pathology of mucous membranes and lymphoid tissue.

He is Deputy editor-in-chief of the professional journal "Immunology and Allergology. Science and Practice", a member of the editorial board of the journal " Asthma and Allergy".

He is the co-author of two textbooks, three manuals, five education programs, over 200 research articles and seven patents of invention.

== International activity ==
Andrii I. Kurchenko is a Fellow of the European Academy of Allergy and Clinical Immunology (EAACI) and American Academy of Allergy, Asthma, and Immunology (AAAAI).

He was one of the organizers of the first International school of young scientists in Ukraine in 2001 under the auspices of the European and American Societies of Immunologists and Allergologists. The school was held in Kyiv and Crimea, where lectures were delivered by 32 professors, while over 100 young scientists from around the world attended the lectures. In the course of its preparation, the co-work with Harvard University Professor, Head of the Immunology Research Institute of New England (IRINE) Lawrence M Dubuske began, which made the beginning of scientific cooperation between O. Bohomolets NMU and the Immunology Research Institute (IRINE) in Gardner city (USA), that has been lasting for more than 20 years.

In 2019 Kurchenko, within the framework of the intergovernmental Agreement between Ukraine and China, paid a working visit to the People's Republic of China on personal invitation of the medical company Jangsu Borun Investment CO.LTD. A. I. Kurchenko gave a series of lectures on genetic bases and modern methods of diagnosis and treatment of the immune-dependent skin diseases. He also conducted a large number of consultations, case conferences and discussions of treatment results. The Agreement on cooperation in scientific and consultative direction with the Research Institute of Prevention and Therapy (Guangzhou, Guangdong Province) was also signed and the negotiations were conducted on the involvement of Ukrainian specialists from academic centers and universities in joint scientific projects.

He participated in the Second Ukrainian-Chinese top level Forum on Traditional Chinese Medicine (TCM), dedicated to the integration of TCM into the healthcare industry of Ukraine ( 6–7 October 2019, Kyiv).

== Awards ==
- In October 2016, he was awarded a Certificate of Acknowledgment of the Ministry of Education and Science of Ukraine.
- At the end of 2019, he was honored with the Special Award by the Ukrainian Association of Eastern Medicine: "Contribution to Spreading Chinese Medicine Culture in Ukraine Award" for making outstanding contributions to the development of Sino-Ukrainian cooperation in the field of Chinese medicine.

== Textbooks ==
- Clinical and laboratory immunology. National textbook (in Ukrainian) / under the general editorship of Professor L.V. Kuznetsova, PhD in Medicine; Professor V.M. Frolov, PhD in Medicine; Professor V.D. Babadjan, PhD in Medicine – K.: OOO "Polygraph Plus", 2012. – 922 p. – ISBN 978-966-8977-28-2
- Immunology. National textbook (in Ukrainian) / under the general editorship of Professor L.V. Kuznetsova, Professor V.D. Babadjan, Corresponding Member of the National Academy of Medical Sciences of Ukraine, Professor N.V. Kharchenko – Vinnytsia: OOO "Mercury Podillya", 2013. – 563 p. – ISBN 978-966-2696-79-0

== Publications ==
- The immune system of mucous membranes, physiological microflora and probiotics: a monograph (in Russian) / H.M. Drannik, A.I. Kurchenko, A.H. Drannik. – K.: Polygraph Plus, 2009. – 141 p. – ISBN 978-966-8977-02-2
- Contemporary ideas on the etiology and pathogenesis of rhinosinusitis polyposa occurring in the setting of the perennial allergic rhinitis: a monograph (in Russian) / L.V. Kuznetsova et al. – Kyiv: Actavis Ukraine, 2015. – 94 p.
- The role of staphylococcal superantigens in the pathogenesis of atopic dermatitis (in Ukrainian) // Infect. Diseases. – 2006. – № 3.
- Production of TNF-α and IL-12 by Peripheral Blood Mononuclear Lymphocytes from Patients with Herpes Virus Infections Reflects the Intensity of Clinical Symptoms // Clinical Immunology. – 2008. – Vol. 127 (співавт.).
- Cytokine Profile Shifts In Patients With Recurrent Herpes Simplex Of The Oral Mucosa And Lips // J. of Allergy and Clinical Immunology. – 2012. – Vol. 129, issue 2 (співавт.).

== Sources ==
- H. V. Fedoruk. "Andrii Ihorovych Kurchenko". Encyclopedia of Modern Ukraine. (in Ukrainian)
- "A. Kurchenko". Elsevier.
- "A. I. Kurchenko". ResearchGate.
