= Aeroflot Flight 244 =

1970 hijacking in the Soviet Union

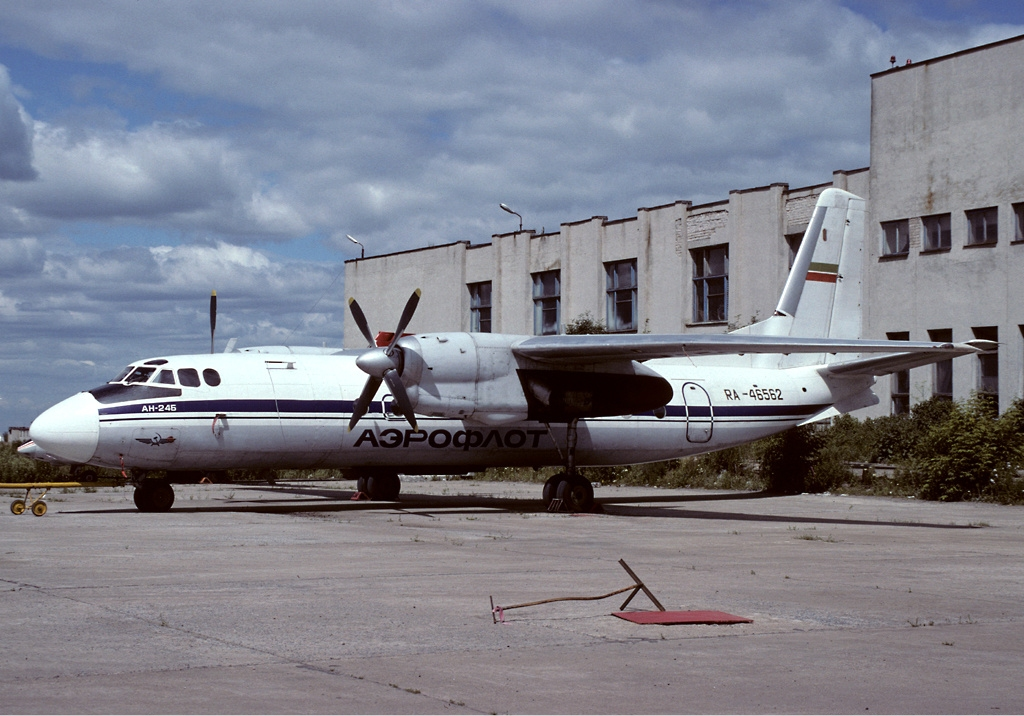
- An Aeroflot Antonov An-24B, similar to the one involved in the hijacking

Hijacking
- Date: 15 October 1970; 55 years ago
- Summary: Hijacking
- Site: Georgian SSR

Aircraft
- Aircraft type: Antonov An-24B
- Operator: Aeroflot
- Registration: СССР-46256
- Flight origin: Batumi, Adjar ASSR, Georgian SSR
- Stopover: Sukhumi, Abkhaz ASSR, Georgian SSR
- Destination: Krasnodar, Russian SFSR
- Occupants: 50
- Passengers: 45
- Crew: 4
- Fatalities: 1
- Injuries: 3
- Survivors: 49

Aeroflot Flight 244 was a scheduled passenger flight originating in Batumi, Georgian SSR, to Krasnodar, Russian SFSR, with a stopover in Sukhumi, Georgian SSR. On 15 October 1970, an An-24B operated by Aeroflot was hijacked, making it the first known successful airline hijacking in the Soviet Union. A flight attendant was killed during the incident.

== Synopsis ==
Lithuanian Pranas Brazinskas and his 13-year-old son Algirdas seized an Antonov An-24B domestic passenger plane en route from Batumi, Adjar ASSR, Georgian SSR, to Sukhumi and Krasnodar to defect to the West. Pranas had been sentenced twice by the Soviet authorities in 1955 and 1965 for financial crimes related to state-run shops where he worked. They selected seats closest to the cockpit in the cabin. Five minutes after takeoff while the aircraft was at an altitude of 800 metres (2,600 ft), they called over the flight attendant Nadezhda Kurchenko and demanded control of the aircraft in a threatening note. Kurchenko tried to block the entrance to the cockpit but failed, yelling out that the two were armed shortly before the hijackers shot her twice at point blank range, killing her.

Several members of the crew were wounded in the onboard shootout. Pranas Brazinskas claimed the shootout occurred because of resistance from two armed guards on board. According to Russian media, the shootout was started by Brazinskas when the flight attendant ran to the cockpit to warn the pilots, and there were no guards on board. The hijackers commandeered the plane to Trabzon, Turkiye, and surrendered to the Turkish government.

== Aftermath ==
The Brazinskas were tried and imprisoned, but Turkiye refused to extradite them to the Soviet authorities. The plane with its passengers was soon returned to the USSR. After spending some time in prison, the Brazinskas were granted amnesty in 1974 and made their way to Venezuela and finally to the United States. They were initially arrested but later allowed to apply for asylum.

The Soviet Union condemned the United States for granting asylum to murderers and pressed for their extradition. Up until the dissolution of the Soviet Union in 1991, the Soviet government continued to press for the extradition of the Brazinskas, and regularly assailed what they alleged was American hypocrisy in harboring terrorists who attack the aircraft of socialist countries, while pursuing very different actions against terrorists who attacked American nationals, such as in the Achille Lauro case.

== Related events ==
The 1973 Soviet film "Абитуриентка" (High School Graduate) recounted the hijacking; an An-24B used during filming later crashed in 1979 while operating as Aeroflot Flight 7502.

In 2002, Algirdas (now known as Albert Victor White) was convicted in Santa Monica of murdering his 77-year-old father Pranas (by then known as Frank White) during a family argument. He was sentenced to 16 years to life in prison for second degree murder with a deadly weapon.

After the hijacking, flight number 244 was still in use, even after the dissolution of the Soviet Union in 1991. The current flight departs from Moscow to Mahé, Seychelles.

== See also ==
- Aeroflot Flight 6833
- List of Soviet and Eastern Bloc defectors
