= Nadezhda Kurchenko =

Soviet flight attendant (1950–1970)

- Надежда Владимировна Курченко
- Born: 29 December 1950; Novopoltava, Klyuchevsky District, Altai Krai, Russian SFSR, Soviet Union
- Died: 15 October 1970 (aged 19); Soviet airspace
- Occupation: Aeroflot flight attendant

Nadezhda Vladimirovna Kurchenko (29 December 1950 – 15 October 1970) was a Soviet flight attendant who tried to prevent the hijacking of Aeroflot Flight 244. Having warned the crew, Kurchenko sought to block the entrance to the cockpit, which at the time was not normally locked. She was killed in a struggle with one of the hijackers.

Kurchenko posthumously received the Order of the Red Banner. A mountain in the Gissar Range, asteroid 2349 Kurchenko, a tanker, a park and a street in Sukhumi were named after her.

== Early life ==
Kurchenko was born in the settlement of Novo-Poltava, Klyuchevsky District, then in Russian SSR. Later her parents moved to the Udmurtian village of Ponino, where she finished boarding school. Kurchenko aspired to enroll in law school, but ultimately became a flight attendant. In 1968 she moved to Abkhazia and worked in the accounting office of the Sukhumi aviation unit.

== Death ==
On 15 October 1970 an Antonov An-24B, servicing Aeroflot Flight 244, left Batumi for Krasnodar. Ten minutes after takeoff, at an altitude of 800 m (2,600 ft), two men called Kurchenko. Showing sawed-off shotguns and a grenade, they demanded her to pass the pilots a note demanding them to divert the aircraft to Turkey. The hijackers, Pranas Brazinskas and his teenaged son Algirdas Brazinskas, sought a defection from the Soviet Union. Kurchenko rushed to the cockpit and shouted "Assault!" The hijackers ran after her. Algirdas Brazinskas shouted to the passengers "Don't you get up or we'll blow up the plane!"

Kurchenko shouted to the crew "Watch out, they are armed!", which were her last words. She tried to knock away the sawed-off shotgun from one of the hijackers. At that moment, Pranas Brazinskas fatally shot Kurchenko in the chest twice and she fell backwards.

== Aftermath ==
In 1970, Kurchenko was buried in the center of Sukhumi, but 20 years later, due to unrest in that city, her grave was moved to the city cemetery of Glazov.

Following Kurchenko's death, almost all Aeroflot flights were accompanied by employees of the Soviet Ministry of the Interior. After repair, the hijacked aircraft returned to service with a photo of Kurchenko in the cabin. A museum dedicated to Kurchenko was opened in Izhevsk.

== See also ==
- Tamara Zharkaya
