= Comet NEAT (disambiguation) =

Comet NEAT may refer to any comets below discovered by the Near-Earth Asteroid Tracking survey:

== Periodic comets ==
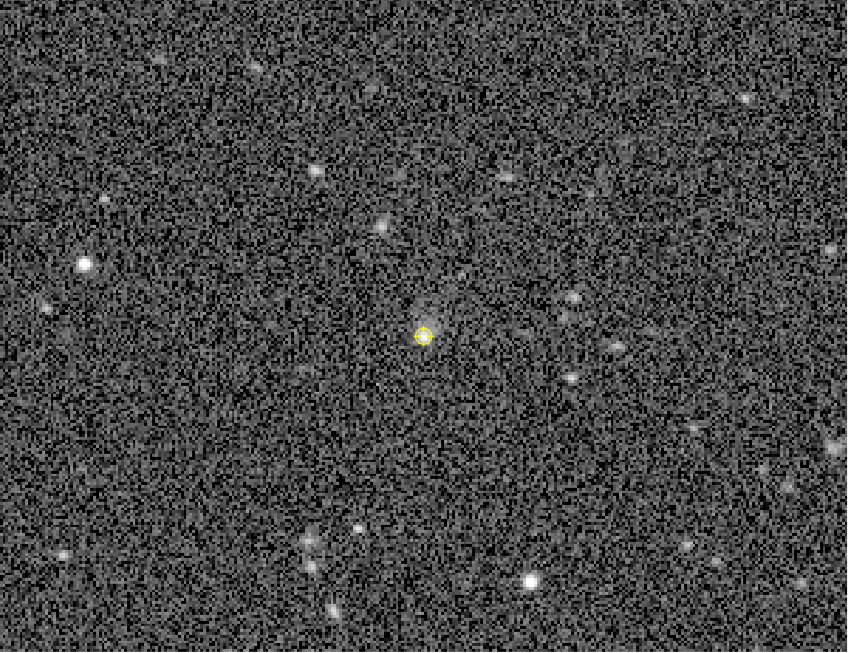
180P/NEAT

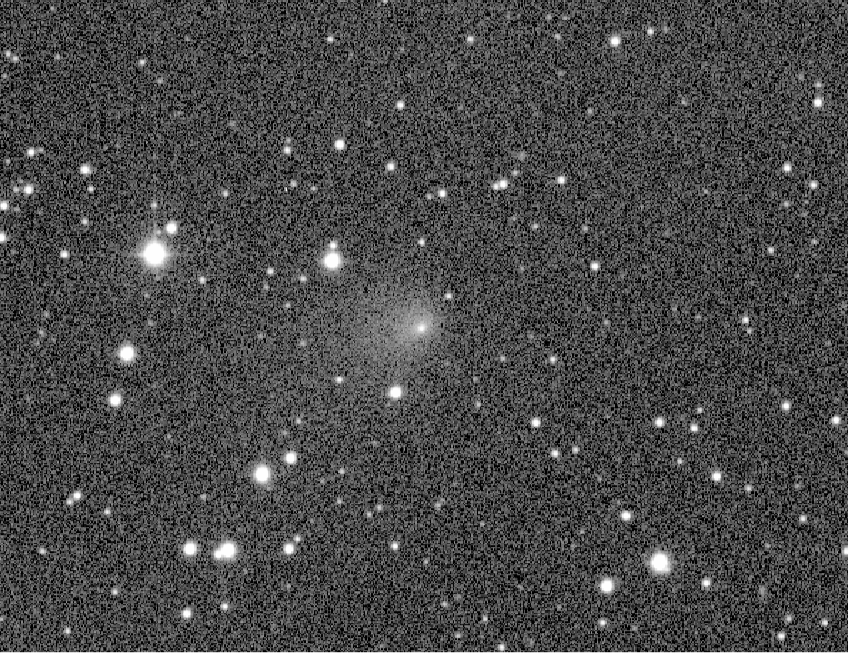
207P/NEAT

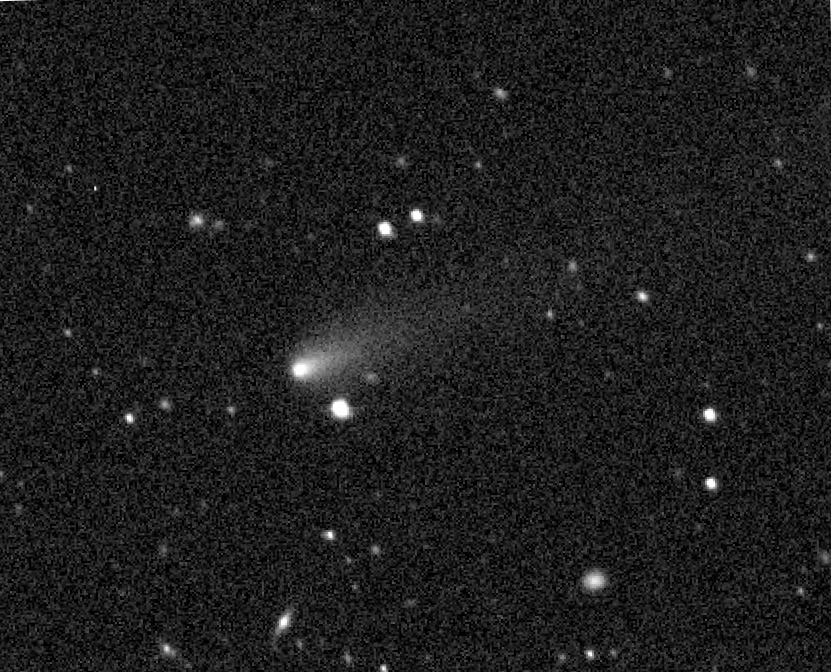
240P/NEAT

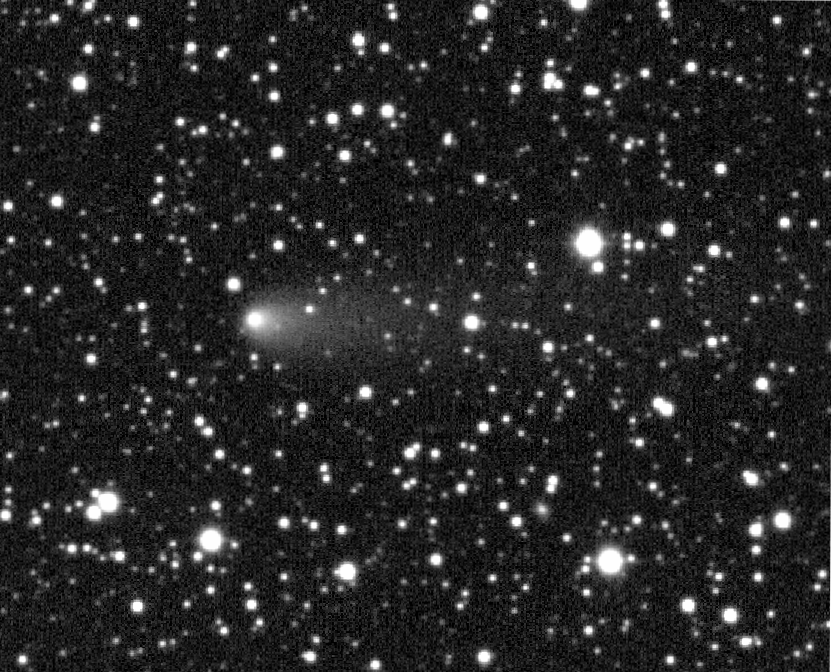
246P/NEAT

=== Jupiter-family comets ===
- 163P/NEAT
- 169P/NEAT
- 180P/NEAT
- 189P/NEAT
- 207P/NEAT
- 212P/NEAT
- 215P/NEAT
- 240P/NEAT
- 243P/NEAT
- 246P/NEAT
- 272P/NEAT
- 291P/NEAT
- 303P/NEAT
- 312P/NEAT
- 334P/NEAT
- 368P/NEAT
- 370P/NEAT
- 433P/2005 QN_{173}, also an active asteroid discovered by the NEAT survey
- 502P/NEAT
- P/2001 H5 (NEAT)
- P/2003 F2 (NEAT)

=== Halley-type comets ===
- 473P/NEAT
- C/2001 M10 (NEAT)
- C/2002 K4 (NEAT)
- C/2003 E1 (NEAT)

=== Chiron-type comets ===
- 166P/NEAT

== Non-periodic comets ==
=== Near-parabolic comets ===
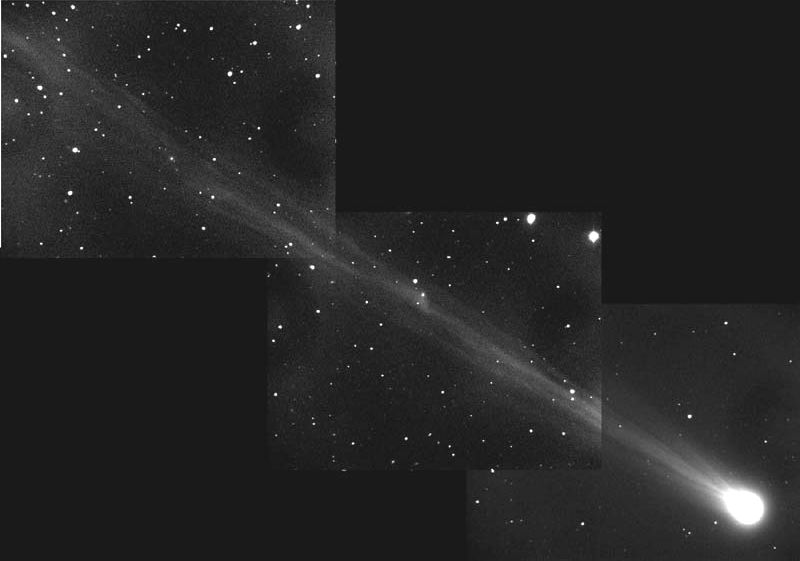
C/2002 V1

- C/2001 O2 (NEAT)
- C/2001 Q1 (NEAT)
- C/2002 J4 (NEAT)
- C/2002 K1 (NEAT)
- C/2002 L9 (NEAT)
- C/2002 P1 (NEAT)
- C/2002 V1 (NEAT)
- C/2003 H3 (NEAT)
- C/2003 J1 (NEAT)
- C/2004 P1 (NEAT)
- C/2005 O1 (NEAT)
- C/2006 K4 (NEAT)

=== Hyperbolic comets ===
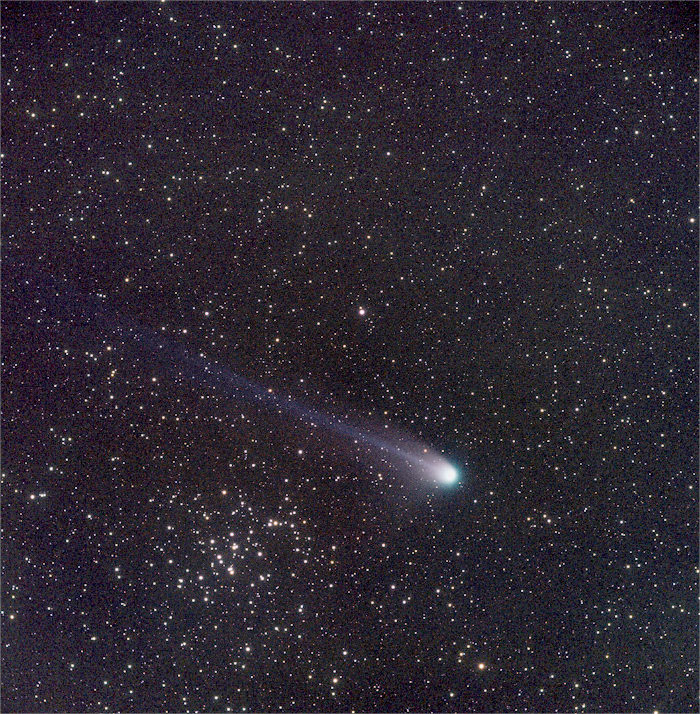
C/2001 Q4

- C/1996 E1 (NEAT)
- C/1997 A1 (NEAT)
- C/2001 B2 (NEAT)
- C/2001 Q4 (NEAT)
- C/2004 D1 (NEAT)

== Others ==
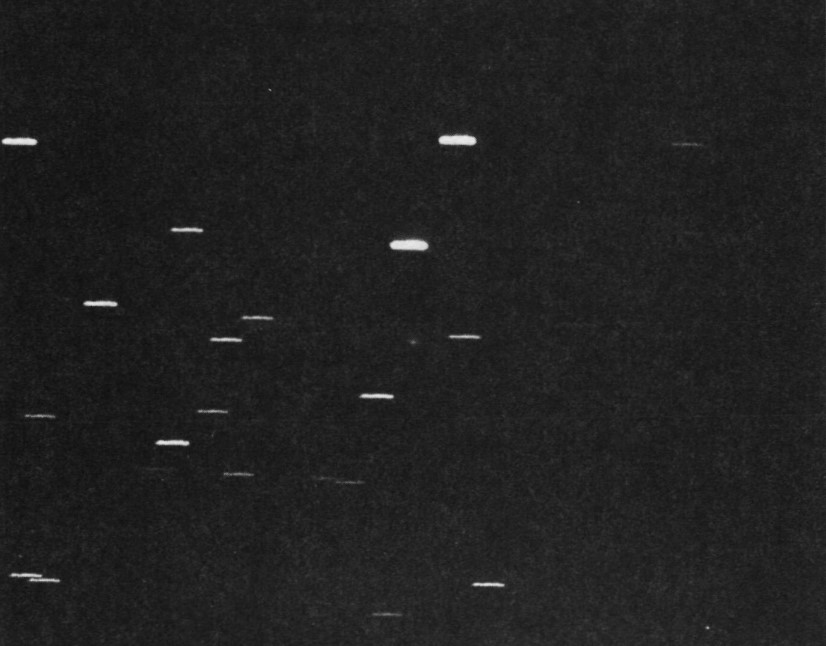
54P/de Vico–Swift–NEAT

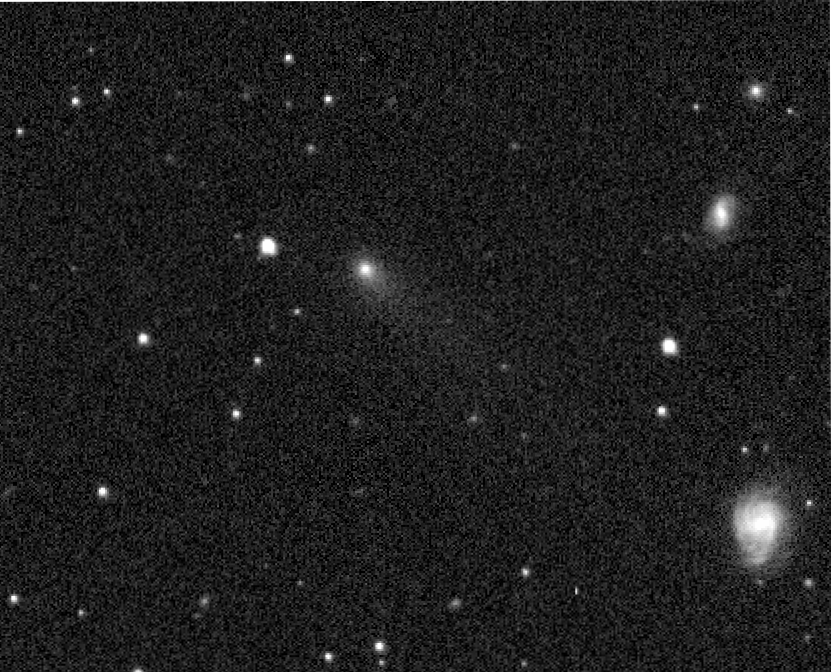
193P/LINEAR–NEAT

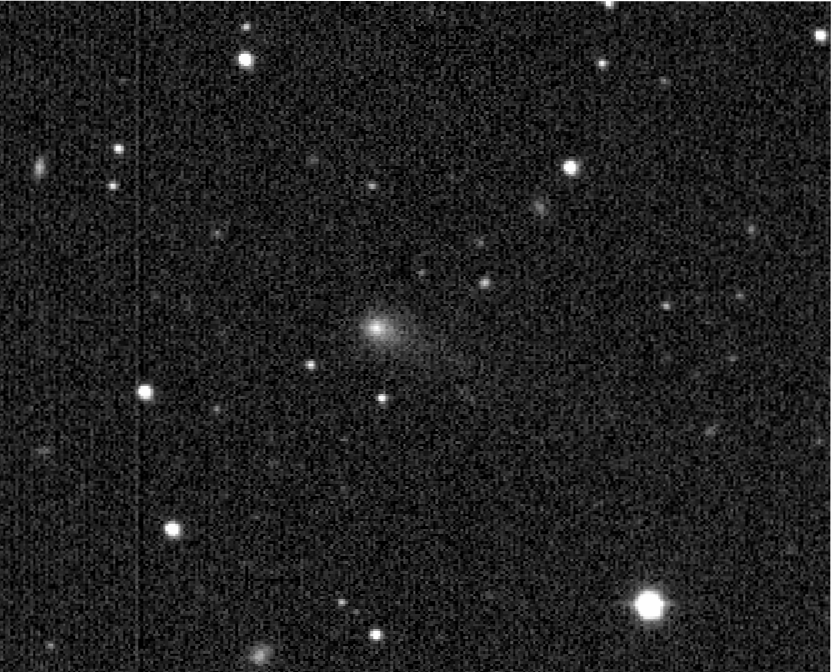
395P/Catalina–NEAT

"Comet NEAT" may also be an incomplete reference to a comet co-discovered by the Near-Earth Asteroid Tracking survey. These include:

- Comet Catalina–NEAT
  - 395P/Catalina–NEAT
- Comet de Vico–Swift–NEAT
  - 54P/de Vico–Swift–NEAT
- Comet LINEAR–NEAT
  - 193P/LINEAR–NEAT
  - 204P/LINEAR–NEAT
  - 224P/LINEAR–NEAT
  - 231P/LINEAR–NEAT
  - 301P/LINEAR–NEAT
  - 355P/LINEAR–NEAT
  - C/2001 HT50 (LINEAR–NEAT)
  - P/2004 R3 (LINEAR–NEAT)
- Comet NEAT–LINEAR
  - 410P/NEAT–LINEAR
  - 472P/NEAT–LINEAR
- Comet NEAT–LONEOS
  - 343P/NEAT–LONEOS
