= 164P/Christensen =

Jupiter-family comet

- Comet Christensen 2 imaged from the Zwicky Transient Facility on 4 November 2018

Discovery
- Discovered by: Eric J. Christensen
- Discovery date: 21 December 2004

Designations
- MPC designation: P/2004 Y1
- Alternative designations: Christensen 2

Orbital characteristics
- Epoch: 9 June 2026 (JD 2461200.5)
- Observation arc: 28.35 years (Note: Observation arc from the Minor Planet Center database covering dates from 24 January 1998 until 1 June 2026.)
- Earliest precovery date: 24 January 1998
- Number of observations: 2,229
- Aphelion: 5.626 AU
- Perihelion: 1.674 AU
- Semi-major axis: 3.650 AU
- Eccentricity: 0.54136
- Orbital period: 6.974 years
- Inclination: 16.275°
- Longitude of ascending node: 88.259°
- Argument of periapsis: 325.89°
- Mean anomaly: 53.379°
- Last perihelion: 27 May 2025
- Next perihelion: April–May 2032
- T_{Jupiter}: 2.777
- Earth MOID: 0.722 AU
- Jupiter MOID: 0.278 AU

Physical characteristics
- Mean radius: 1.945 km (1.209 mi)
- Comet total magnitude (M1): 14.3

164P/Christensen, also known as Comet Christensen 2, is a Jupiter-family comet with a 6.97-year orbit around the Sun. It is one of several comets discovered by American astronomer, Eric J. Christensen.

== Observational history ==
The comet was discovered by Eric J. Christensen in late 2004 from images in the Catalina Sky Survey. It was the second comet he discovered after 210P/Christensen. At the time of discovery the comet had an apparent magnitude of 16.5 in the constellation Leo.

== Notes ==
Numbered comets
Previous; 163P/NEAT	164P/Christensen	Next; 165P/LINEAR
