= 3728 IRAS =

Asteroid

Discovery
- Discovered by: IRAS
- Discovery date: 23 August 1983

Designations
- Named after: IRAS (space observatory)
- Alternative designations: 1983 QF · 1948 RN; 1963 FA · 1972 FH; 1976 GL · 1985 GT
- Minor planet category: main-belt · (middle)

Orbital characteristics
- Epoch 4 September 2017 (JD 2458000.5)
- Uncertainty parameter 0
- Observation arc: 68.74 yr (25,108 days)
- Aphelion: 3.2138 AU
- Perihelion: 2.0862 AU
- Semi-major axis: 2.6500 AU
- Eccentricity: 0.2128
- Orbital period (sidereal): 4.31 yr (1,576 days)
- Mean anomaly: 276.44°
- Mean motion: 0° 13^{m} 42.6^{s} / day
- Inclination: 22.595°
- Longitude of ascending node: 167.37°
- Argument of perihelion: 281.02°

Physical characteristics
- Dimensions: 19.41 km (derived); 19.55±1.7 km (IRAS:12); 19.83±0.38 km 21.40±0.38 km 23.450±0.115; 27.480±0.177 km
- Synodic rotation period: 8.323±0.002 h
- Geometric albedo: 0.0352±0.0015; 0.0815 (derived); 0.086±0.015; 0.101±0.004; 0.1161±0.023 (IRAS:12)
- Spectral type: CX · S
- Absolute magnitude (H): 11.50 · 11.80 · 11.9 · 12.20±0.23

3728 IRAS, provisional designation 1983 QF, is a stony asteroid from the middle region of the asteroid belt, approximately 20 kilometers in diameter. On 23 August 1983, it was discovered by and later named after IRAS, a spaceborne all-sky infrared survey satellite.

== Classification and orbit ==
The S-type asteroid is also classified as a CX-type by Pan-STARRS' large-scale survey. It orbits the Sun in the central main-belt at a distance of 2.1–3.2 AU once every 4 years and 4 months (1,576 days). Its orbit has an eccentricity of 0.21 and an inclination of 23° with respect to the ecliptic. The first used precovery was taken at Palomar Observatory in 1950, extending the asteroid's observation arc by 33 years prior to its discovery.

== Rotation period ==
In August 2008, a photometric lightcurve analysis by U.S. astronomer Brian Warner at his Palmer Divide Observatory (716), Colorado, gave a well-defined rotation period of 8.323±0.002 hours with a brightness amplitude of 0.21 in magnitude (U=3).

== Diameter estimates ==
According to 12 observations by the discovering Infrared Astronomical Satellite, IRAS, the asteroid has an albedo of 0.12 and a diameter of 19.6 kilometers. The Collaborative Asteroid Lightcurve Link derives similar figures, as do the space-based surveys carried out by the Japanese Akari satellite, and NASA's Wide-field Infrared Survey Explorer. Two publications from the post-cryogenic NEOWISE mission find a larger diameter of 23.4 and 27.5 kilometers, respectively.

== Naming ==
This minor planet was named for the discovering Infrared Astronomical Satellite (IRAS), a collaboration between the Netherlands (NIVR), the United Kingdom (SERC), and the United States (NASA) which observed more than 250,000 celestial bodies in the infrared at wavelengths between 12 and 100 μm during 10 months in 1983. IRAS has also discovered two other minor planets, the 11-kilometer sized main-belt asteroid (10714) 1983 QG and 3200 Phaethon, a near-Earth and potentially hazardous object, parent body of the Geminid meteor shower, as well as six comets, such as 126P/IRAS, a short-period Jupiter family comet, which was also named after the discovering space observatory. The approved naming citation was published by the Minor Planet Center on 4 May 1999 (M.P.C. 34619).
