= 125P/Spacewatch =

Jupiter-family comet

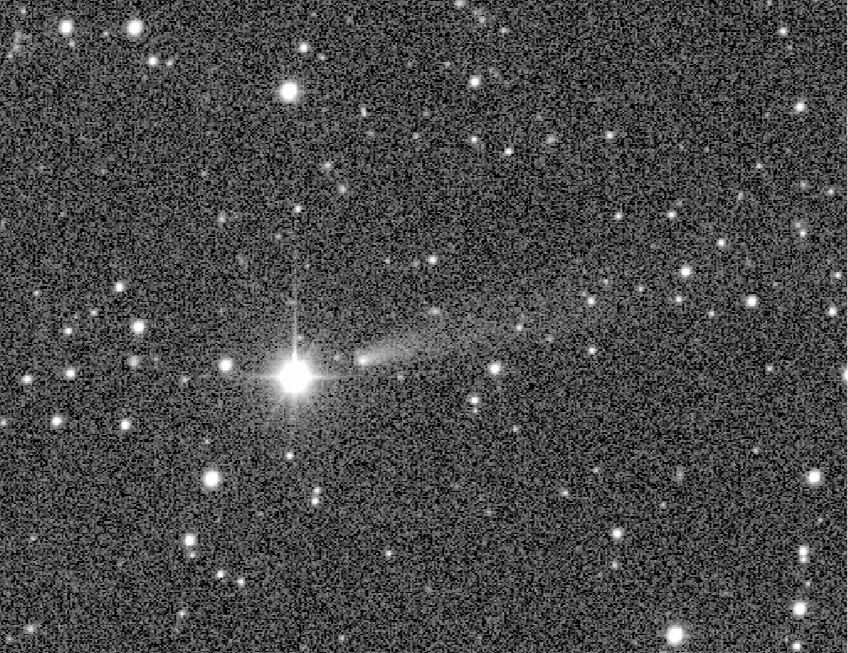
- Comet 125P/Spacewatch photographed from the Zwicky Transient Facility on 3 June 2024

Discovery
- Discovered by: Spacewatch; Tom Gehrels
- Discovery site: Kitt Peak Observatory
- Discovery date: 8 September 1991

Designations
- MPC designation: P/1991 R2, P/1996 F1
- Alternative designations: Spacewatch 1; 1990 XXIX, 1991x

Orbital characteristics
- Epoch: 11 August 2015 (JD 2457245.5)
- Observation arc: 33.12 years (Note: Observation arc from the Minor Planet Center database covering dates from 8 September 1991 until 21 October 2024.)
- Number of observations: 1,297
- Aphelion: 4.728 AU
- Perihelion: 1.523 AU
- Semi-major axis: 3.126 AU
- Eccentricity: 0.51269
- Orbital period: 5.526 years
- Inclination: 9.988°
- Longitude of ascending node: 153.19°
- Argument of periapsis: 87.145°
- Mean anomaly: 161.39°
- Last perihelion: 7 March 2024
- Next perihelion: 15 September 2029
- T_{Jupiter}: 2.975
- Earth MOID: 0.554 AU
- Jupiter MOID: 0.810 AU

Physical characteristics
- Mean radius: 0.83 km (0.52 mi)
- Comet total magnitude (M1): 12.9
- Comet nuclear magnitude (M2): 16.7

125P/Spacewatch is a Jupiter-family comet with a 5.53-year orbit around the Sun. It was discovered on 8 September 1991 by Tom Gehrels using the 0.91 m Spacewatch telescope at the Kitt Peak National Observatory. It was the first comet discovered with the use of a CCD, and also the faintest comet upon discovery up to that point. Its nucleus has a diameter of 1.66 km (1.03 mi).

== Observational history ==
The comet was discovered in images taken by the 0.91 m Spacewatch telescope at the Kitt Peak National Observatory by Tom Gehrels on September 8, 1991, as an essentially stellar object with an apparent magnitude of 21, with a tail more than 5 arcminutes long. Brian G. Marsden calculated a parabolic and an elliptical orbit, with the elliptical orbit suggesting an orbital period of 5.58 years and a perihelion date on 18 December 1990.

The comet was recovered on 21 March 1996 by the Spacewatch telescope from James V. Scotti and J. Montani, with an apparent magnitude of 17.6, a tail measuring 0.66 arcminutes long and a coma measuring 15 arcseconds across. The orbit calculated after the recovery indicates an orbital period of 5.56 years. During that apparition the comet experienced an outburst in late July 1996 and brightened to a magnitude of 14.5. During the 2002 apparition the comet brightened to a magnitude of 18.

== Notes ==
Numbered comets
Previous; 124P/Mrkos	125P/Spacewatch	Next; 126P/IRAS
