= 162P/Siding Spring =

Jupiter-family comet

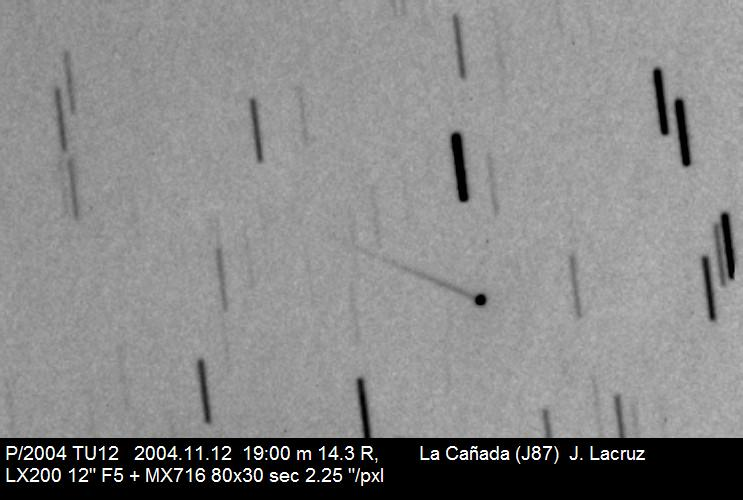
- The comet on 12 November 2004, displaying a narrow tail

Discovery
- Discovery site: Siding Spring Observatory
- Discovery date: 10 October 2004

Designations
- MPC designation: P/2004 TU_{12}
- Alternative designations: Siding Spring 2

Orbital characteristics
- Epoch: 5 May 2025 (JD 2460800.5)
- Observation arc: 36.48 years (Note: Observation arc from the Minor Planet Center database covering dates from 23 March 1990 until 14 September 2026.)
- Earliest precovery date: 23 March 1990
- Number of observations: 3,317
- Aphelion: 4.894 AU
- Perihelion: 1.289 AU
- Semi-major axis: 3.092 AU
- Eccentricity: 0.58295
- Orbital period: 5.33 years
- Inclination: 27.554°
- Longitude of ascending node: 30.878°
- Argument of periapsis: 357.24°
- Mean anomaly: 291.51°
- Last perihelion: 17 May 2026
- Next perihelion: 14 October 2031
- T_{Jupiter}: 2.792
- Earth MOID: 0.239 AU
- Jupiter MOID: 0.587 AU

Physical characteristics
- Mean diameter: 14.06±0.96 km
- Sidereal rotation period: 32.864±0.001 hours
- Geometric albedo: 0.022±0.003
- Spectral type: (V–R) = 0.45±0.01
- Comet total magnitude (M1): 15.2

162P/Siding Spring is a Jupiter-family comet with an orbital period of 5.3 years. It was discovered in images obtained on 10 October 2004 as part of the Siding Spring Survey.

== Observational history ==
The comet was discovered during the Siding Spring Survey as an asteroidal object shining with an apparent magnitude of 14.1 but a tail extending for about 4 arcminutes was observed on 12 November 2004, indicating that it is a comet. The tail grew longer the next days, reaching a length of over 10 arcminutes on 15 November. Two days later the tail was fainter, and barely visible within one arcminute from the nucleus. On 21 October 2031, the comet will approach Earth at a distance of 0.2456 AU (36.74 million km).

== Physical characteristics ==
The comet was observed by NASA Infrared Telescope Facility in 2004, finding that the nucleus has an effective radius of 6.0±0.8 km, which corresponds to a visual albedo of 0.034±0.014, and a reflectance spectrum typical of a D-type asteroid. Further observations by the Spitzer Space Telescope indicate an effective radius of 7.03 ± 0.48 km. This is one of the largest nuclei of Jupiter family comets with known radius. More detailed observations indicate that the nucleus has axis ratios a/b = 1.56 and b/c = 2.33, and could possibly have two lobes. The sidereal period of the comet is 32.864±0.001 hours.

== See also ==
- 107P/Wilson-Harrington and 133P/Elst-Pizarro - comets with similar intermittent activity

== Notes ==
Numbered comets
Previous; 161P/Hartley–IRAS	162P/Siding Spring	Next; 163P/NEAT
