= C/2006 W3 (Christensen) =

Non-periodic comet

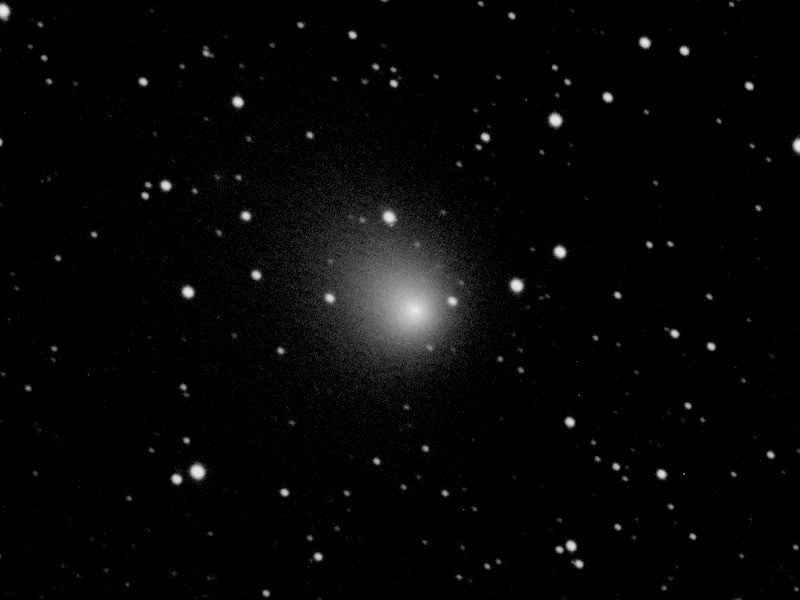
- Comet C/2006 W3 (Christensen) photographed near Mayhill, New Mexico on 25 June 2009

Discovery
- Discovered by: Eric J. Christensen
- Discovery site: Catalina Sky Survey
- Discovery date: 18 November 2006

Orbital characteristics
- Epoch: 11 March 2009 (JD 2454901.5)
- Observation arc: 4.90 years (1,791 days)
- Earliest precovery date: 29 October 2006
- Number of observations: 5,639
- Aphelion: ~5,300 AU (inbound); ~8,200 AU (outbound)
- Perihelion: 3.126 AU
- Eccentricity: 0.99982
- Orbital period: ~140,000 years (inbound); ~260,000 years (outbound)
- Max. orbital speed: 23.8 km/s
- Inclination: 127.07°
- Longitude of ascending node: 113.57°
- Argument of periapsis: 133.51°
- Last perihelion: 6 July 2009
- T_{Jupiter}: –1.321
- Earth MOID: 2.299 AU
- Jupiter MOID: 1.304 AU

Physical characteristics
- Mean radius: 13.0±2.0 km
- Synodic rotation period: 21 hours
- Geometric albedo: 0.04 (assumed)
- Comet total magnitude (M1): 8.2
- Apparent magnitude: 7.6 (2009 apparition)

C/2006 W3 (Christensen) is a non-periodic comet that was observed through telescopes between 2006 and 2011. It is one of several comets discovered by American astronomer, Eric J. Christensen.

== Physical characteristics ==
Infrared observations from Herschel and Spitzer in 2009 allowed astronomers to estimate the size and rotation of C/2003 W3's nucleus. Initial estimates in 2010 revealed an effective radius of <26 km (16 mi), however this value was later revised to 13±2 km in 2016, assuming a geometric albedo of 0.04. Data from Spitzer also revealed that the comet has a rotation period of 21 hours.
