= GGSE-4 =

The Gravity Gradient Stabilization Experiment (GGSE-4) was a technology satellite launched in 1967. This was ostensibly the fourth in a series that developed designs and deployment techniques later applied to the NOSS/Whitecloud reconnaissance satellites.

== History ==
GGSE-4 was launched by the U.S. Airforce from Vandenberg Air Force Base atop a Thor Agena-D rocket. GGSE-4 remained operational from 1967 through 1972.

It is alleged that the real name of GGSE-4 was POPPY 5B or POPPY 5b and that it was a U.S. National Reconnaissance Office satellite designed to collect signals intelligence; POPPY 5B was part of a 7-satellite mission. A partial subset of information about POPPY was declassified in 2005.

Other sources say that GGSE-4 weighed only 10 pounds but that it was attached to the much larger Poppy 5, which would have weighed 85 kg and featured an 18-meter boom. It is further alleged that GGSE-4's mass is not at all like GGSE-1's mass and that GGSE'4 weighs 85 kg.

== 2020 near-miss ==
On 29 January 2020, 23:39:35 UTC, GGSE-4 was expected to pass as closely as 12 meters from IRAS, another un-deorbited satellite left aloft. IRAS was launched in 1983 and abandoned after a 10-month mission. The 14.7-kilometer per second pass had an estimated risk of collision of 5%. Further complications arose from the fact that GGSE-4 was outfitted with an 18 meter long stabilization boom that was in an unknown orientation and may have struck the satellite even if the spacecraft's main body did not. Initial observations from amateur astronomers seemed to indicate that both satellites had survived the pass, with the California-based debris tracking organization LeoLabs later confirming that they had detected no new tracked debris following the incident.

== See also ==
Gravity Gradient Stabilization Experiment (GGSE-1)
