= 161P/Hartley–IRAS =

Halley-type comet

- 161P/Hartley–IRAS on 30 September 2026 11PM PDT with a 6" refractor and combined stacks on the comet and stars.

Discovery
- Discovered by: Malcolm Hartley; IRAS
- Discovery date: 4–10 November 1983

Designations
- MPC designation: P/1983 V1; P/2004 V2
- Alternative designations: 1984 III, 1983v

Orbital characteristics
- Epoch: 9 June 2026 (JD 2461200.5)
- Observation arc: 42.77 years (Note: Observation arc from the Minor Planet Center database covering dates from 4 November 1983 until 13 August 2026.)
- Number of observations: 425
- Aphelion: 14.178 AU
- Perihelion: 1.265 AU
- Semi-major axis: 7.722 AU
- Eccentricity: 0.83616
- Orbital period: 21.457 years
- Inclination: 95.791°
- Longitude of ascending node: 1.475°
- Argument of periapsis: 47.068°
- Mean anomaly: 352.14°
- Last perihelion: 20 June 2005
- Next perihelion: 27 November 2026
- T_{Jupiter}: 0.540
- Earth MOID: 0.442 AU
- Jupiter MOID: 0.112 AU

Physical characteristics
- Comet total magnitude (M1): 11.5
- Comet nuclear magnitude (M2): 15.0
- Apparent magnitude: 7.8 (1983 apparition)

161P/Hartley–IRAS is a Halley-type comet in a retrograde orbit with an orbital period of 21 years. This is the sixth and final comet discovered by the infrared space telescope IRAS, and the third of twelve comets discovered overall by Australian astronomer, Malcolm Hartley. (Note: Malcolm Hartley previously recovered 79P/du Toit–Hartley and 80P/Peters–Hartley in February and July 1982 respectively, both of which he is credited as co-discoverer.)

== Observational history ==
Comet 161P/Hartley–IRAS, photographed on 6 October 2026 in Tallinn, Estonia. The star-aligned stack shows the comet’s movement during the imaging session.

=== 1983 apparition and discovery ===
Malcolm Hartley first detected the trail of this comet on a photographic plate exposed from the Siding Spring Observatory on 4 November 1983. At the time it was a 15th-magnitude object within the constellation Capricornus. (Note: Reported initial position upon discovery was: α = 21^{h} 53.6^{m} , δ = –21° 18′) However, before he could obtain a confirmation plate, John K. Davies and Simon F. Green reported that the Infrared Astronomical Satellite (IRAS) detected a comet on 10 November 1983. Kenneth S. Russell later confirmed that it was the same object as the one observed by Hartley by 23 November. The discovery was publicly announced on 25 November 1983.

Follow-up observations were conducted by Brian A. Skiff, James B. Gibson, Richard E. McCrosky and others in December 1983, reporting a weak condensation and a short tail. John E. Bortle reported that the comet reached peak brightness at magnitude 7.8 on 24 February 1984, indicating that it produced an outburst that brightened it by two magnitudes. It faded gradually in the coming months, and by 27 May 1984, Hartley–IRAS had a total visual magnitude of 12.2. The comet was last observed on 4 June 1984.

=== 2005 apparition ===
Robert H. McNaught recovered Comet Hartley–IRAS on 3 November 2004, ahead of its next perihelion on 20 June 2005. The comet was subsequently given an official numerical designation (161P) by the Minor Planet Center on 24 November 2004. It reached magnitude 11.3 on 16 June 2005.

=== 2026 apparition ===
161P/Hartley–IRAS on 11 September 2026. Images stacked on the moving comet creating star trails around it.

The comet was recovered from the Siding Spring Observatory by Hirohisa Sato on 18 July 2026 at nearly 2–3 times fainter than predicted from its previous apparition in 2005. As of October 2026, the comet is around apparent magnitude 12. It reached opposition on 27 September 2026. The closest approach to Earth was on 2 October 2026 at a distance of 0.505 AU (75.5 million km). At perihelion on 27 November 2026, the solar elongation will be 61 degrees at a magnitude of approximately 11.

== Physical characteristics ==
On March 1984, Stephen M. Larson measured the spectroscopy of the comet, detecting emissions of OH, NH, CN, C_{3} and C_{2} from its coma, where it was noted to be comparable to that of 27P/Crommelin.

== Orbit ==
Brian G. Marsden confirmed Hartley–IRAS as a periodic comet on December 1983, where he suspected that the comet may have been near Jupiter sometime in 1957, although this was later refuted by Shuichi Nakano and Kazuo Kinoshita in 1984 and 1998, respectively. As of August 2026, this comet currently completes a 21.4-year orbit around the Sun, reaching perihelion at a distance of 1.27 AU (190 million km) and aphelion of around 14.2 AU (2.12 billion km). It has retrograde, near-polar orbit around the Sun, with only a few close encounters with Jupiter between 1921 and 2171. (Note: Comet Hartley–IRAS encountered Jupiter in 1921 (0.385 AU), and will make further close flybys by 2028 (0.397 AU) and 2171 (0.645 AU) respectively.) Orbital calculations show that while the comet has a nominal Lyapunov time of around 650 years, non-gravitational accelerations caused by its cometary activity will likely perturb its orbit enough to make close encounters with the inner planets (particularly Venus, Earth, and Mars) in the next 5,000 years or so.

== Notes ==
Numbered comets
Previous; 160P/LINEAR	161P/Hartley–IRAS	Next; 162P/Siding Spring
