= IRAS =

Infrared space observatory

Infrared Astronomical Satellite / Infrarood Astronomische Satelliet
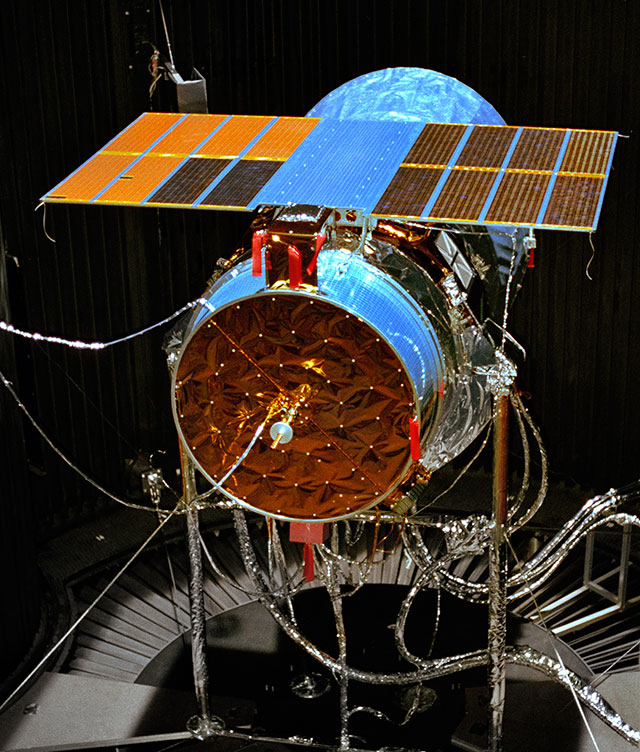
- Infrared Astronomical Satellite in space simulator at JPL, 1982
- Mission type: Infrared space observatory
- Operator: NASA; NIVR; SERC
- COSPAR ID: 1983-004A
- SATCAT no.: 13777
- Website: irsa.ipac.caltech.edu/Missions/iras.html
- Mission duration: Final: 9 months, 26 days

Spacecraft properties
- Manufacturer: Ball Aerospace; Fokker Space; Hollandse Signaal
- Launch mass: 1,083 kg (2,388 lb)
- Dimensions: 3.60 × 3.24 × 2.05 m (11.8 × 10.6 × 6.7 ft)

Start of mission
- Launch date: 25 January 1983, 21:17 UTC
- Rocket: Delta 3910
- Launch site: Vandenberg SLC-2W
- Entered service: 9 February 1983

End of mission
- Disposal: Decommissioned
- Deactivated: 21 November 1983

Orbital parameters
- Reference system: Geocentric
- Regime: Sun-synchronous
- Semi-major axis: 7,270.69 km (4,517.80 mi)
- Eccentricity: 0.001857
- Perigee altitude: 879.05 km (546.22 mi)
- Apogee altitude: 906.05 km (562.99 mi)
- Inclination: 98.95 deg
- Period: 102.8 min
- Mean motion: 14.00 rev/day
- Epoch: 19 November 2016, 04:15:30 UTC

Main telescope
- Type: Ritchey–Chrétien
- Diameter: 57 cm (22 in)
- Focal length: 545 cm (215 in), f/9.56
- Collecting area: 2,019 cm^{2} (312.9 sq in)
- Wavelengths: Long-wavelength to far-infrared
Instruments
- SA: Survey Array
- LRS: Low Resolution Spectrometer
- CPC: Chopped Photometric Channel

The Infrared Astronomical Satellite (Dutch: Infrarood Astronomische Satelliet) (IRAS) was the first space telescope to perform a survey of the entire night sky at infrared wavelengths. Launched on 25 January 1983, its mission lasted ten months. The telescope was a joint project of the United States (NASA), the Netherlands (NIVR), and the United Kingdom (SERC). Over 250,000 infrared sources were observed at 12, 25, 60, and 100 micrometer wavelengths.

Support for the processing and analysis of data from IRAS was contributed from the Infrared Processing and Analysis Center at the California Institute of Technology. Currently, the Infrared Science Archive at IPAC holds the IRAS archive.

The success of IRAS led to interest in the 1985 Infrared Telescope (IRT) mission on the Space Shuttle, and the planned Shuttle Infrared Telescope Facility which eventually transformed into the Space Infrared Telescope Facility, SIRTF, which in turn was developed into the Spitzer Space Telescope, launched in 2003. The success of early infrared space astronomy led to further missions, such as the Infrared Space Observatory (1990s) and the Hubble Space Telescope's NICMOS instrument.

== Mission ==
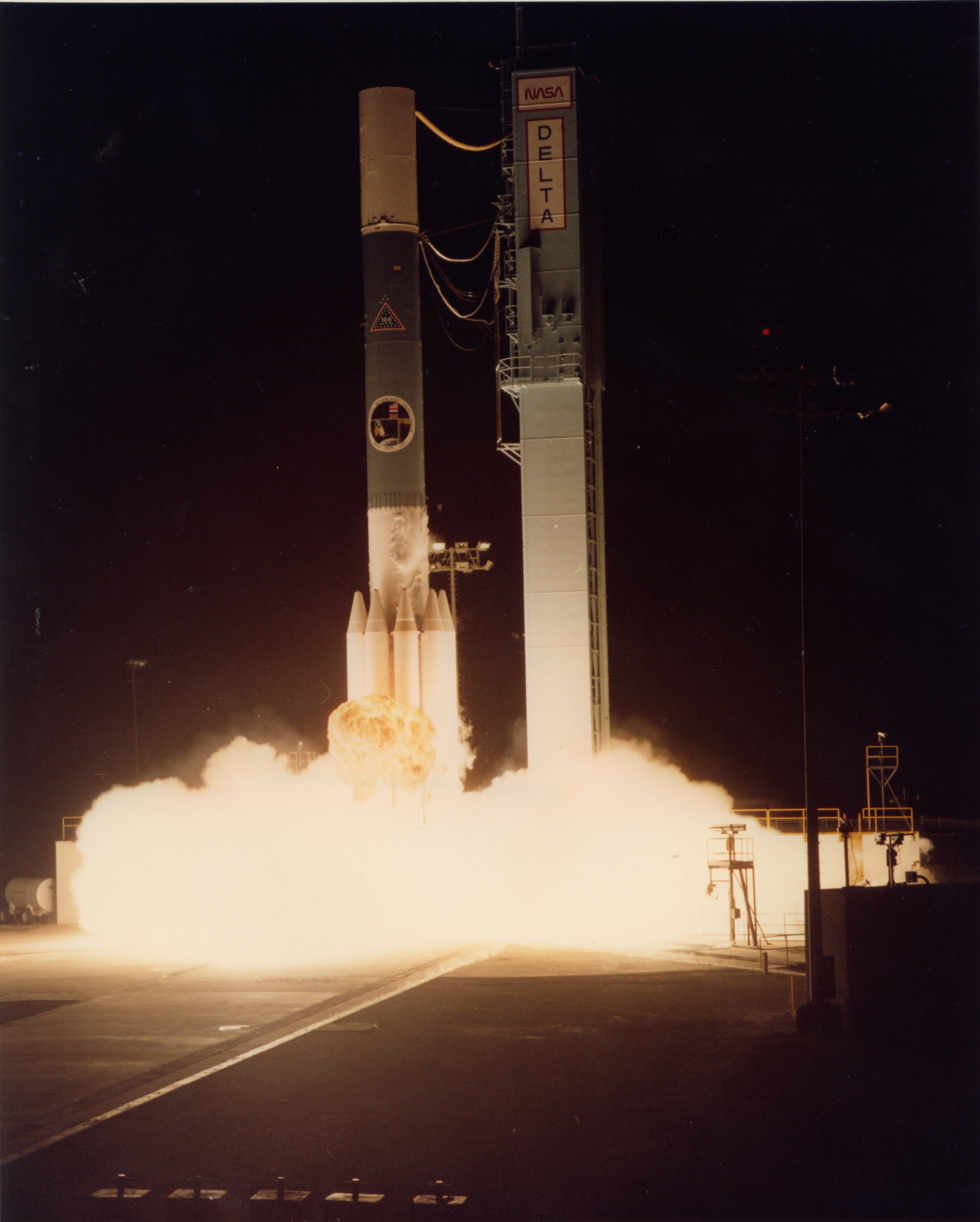
Launch of IRAS in 1983

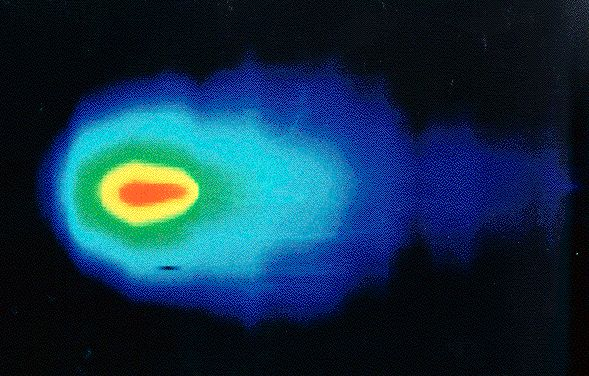
False color image of comet IRAS–Araki–Alcock by IRAS

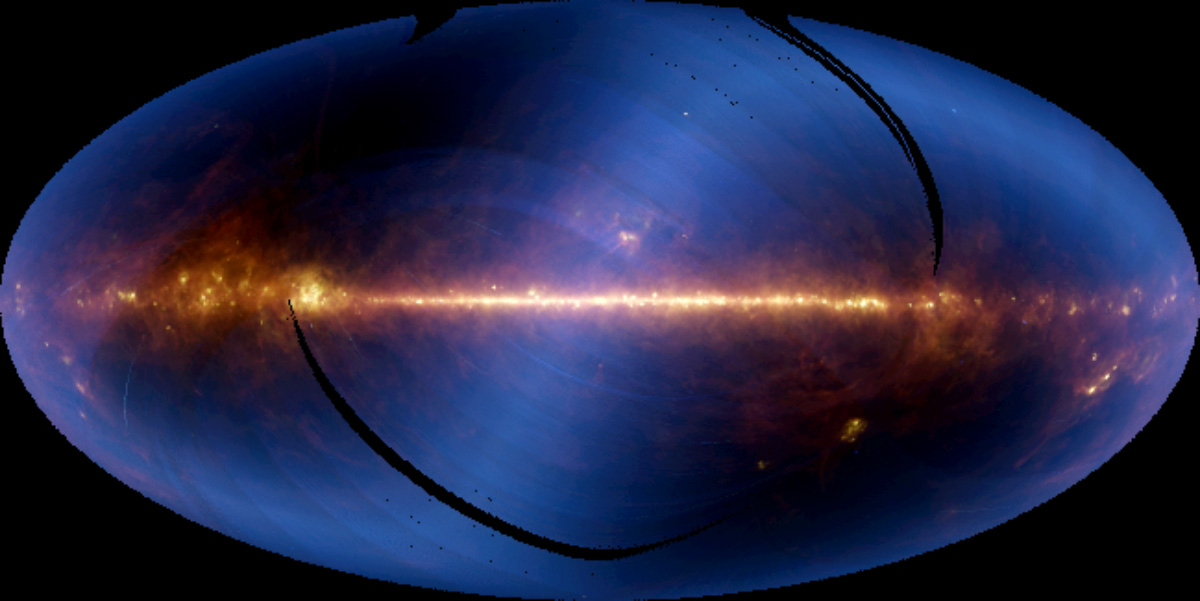
Infrared all-sky survey by IRAS

IRAS was the first observatory to perform an all-sky survey at infrared wavelengths. It mapped 96% of the sky four times, at 12, 25, 60 and 100 micrometers, with resolutions ranging from 30 arcseconds at 12 micrometers to 2 arcminutes at 100 micrometers. It discovered about 350,000 sources, many of which are still awaiting identification. About 75,000 of those are believed to be starburst galaxies, still enduring their star-formation stage. Many other sources are normal stars with disks of dust around them, possibly the early stage of planetary system formation. New discoveries included a dust disk around Vega and the first images of the Milky Way's core.

IRAS's life, like that of most infrared satellites that followed, was limited by its cooling system. To effectively work in the infrared domain, a telescope must be cooled to cryogenic temperatures. In IRAS's case, 73 kilograms (161 lb) of superfluid helium kept the telescope at a temperature of 2 K (−271 °C; −456 °F), keeping the satellite cool by evaporation. IRAS was the first use of superfluids in space. The on-board supply of liquid helium was depleted after 10 months on 21 November 1983, causing the telescope temperature to rise, preventing further observations. The spacecraft continues to orbit the Earth.

IRAS was designed to catalog fixed sources, so it scanned the same region of sky several times. Jack Meadows led a team at Leicester University, including John K. Davies and Simon F. Green, which searched the rejected sources for moving objects. This led to the discovery of three asteroids, including 3200 Phaethon (an Apollo asteroid and the parent body of the Geminid meteor shower), six comets, and a huge dust trail associated with comet 10P/Tempel. The comets included 126P/IRAS, 161P/Hartley–IRAS, and comet IRAS–Araki–Alcock (C/1983 H1), which made a close approach to the Earth in 1983. Out of the six comets IRAS found, four were long period and two were short period comets.

The Supplemental IRAS Minor Planet Survey (SIMPS) would also later use the archived data to search for more minor planets, asteroids.

== Discoveries ==
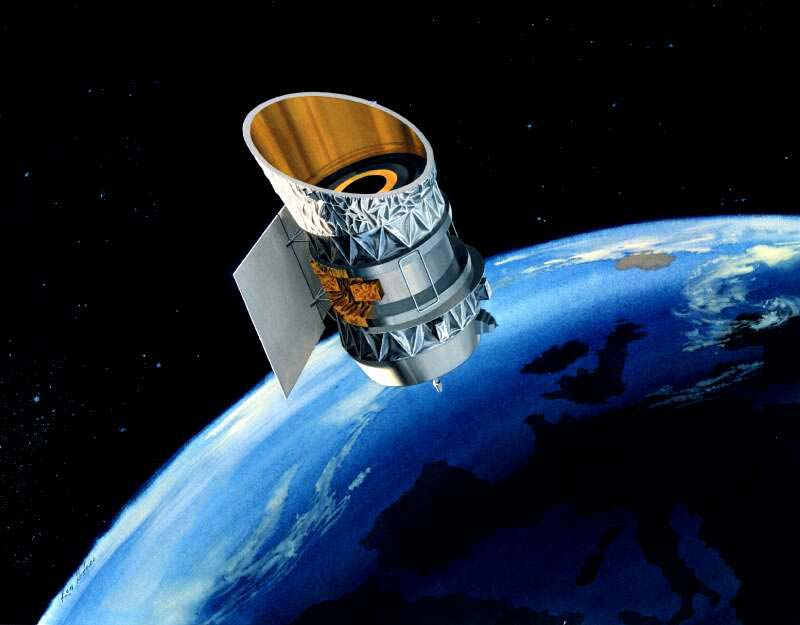
IRAS made its observations from Earth orbit in 1983

Overall, over a quarter million discrete targets were observed during its operations, both inside and beyond the Solar System. In addition, new objects were discovered including asteroids and comets. The observatory made headlines briefly with the announcement on 10 December 1983 of the discovery of an "unknown object" at first described as "possibly as large as the giant planet Jupiter and possibly so close to Earth that it would be part of this solar system". Further analysis revealed that, of several unidentified objects, nine were distant galaxies and the tenth was "intergalactic cirrus". None were found to be Solar System bodies.

During its mission, IRAS (and later the Spitzer Space Telescope) detected odd infrared signatures around several stars. This led to the systems being targeted by the Hubble Space Telescope's NICMOS instrument between 1999 and 2006, but nothing was detected. In 2014, using new image processing techniques on the Hubble data, researchers discovered planetary disks around these stars.

IRAS discovered six comets, out of total of 22 discoveries and recoveries of all comets that year. This was a lot for this period, before the launch of SOHO in 1995, which would allow the discovery of many more comets in the next decade (it would detect 1000 comets in ten years).

=== Asteroid discoveries ===
Minor planets discovered: 4
3200 Phaethon	11 October 1983	list
3728 IRAS	23 August 1983	list
(10714) 1983 QG	31 August 1983	list
(100004) 1983 VA	1 November 1983	list

=== Comet discoveries ===
Comets discovered: 6
C/1983 H1 (IRAS–Araki–Alcock)	25 April 1983	MPC · JPL
C/1983 J2 (IRAS)	18 May 1983	MPC · JPL
C/1983 N1 (IRAS)	14 July 1983	MPC · JPL
126P/IRAS	28 July 1983	MPC · JPL
C/1983 O2 (IRAS)	4 August 1983	MPC · JPL
161P/Hartley–IRAS	4 November 1983	MPC · JPL

== Later surveys ==
Several infrared space telescopes have continued and greatly expanded the study of the infrared Universe, such as the Infrared Space Observatory launched in 1995, the Spitzer Space Telescope launched in 2003, and the Akari Space Telescope launched in 2006.

A next generation of infrared space telescopes began when NASA's Wide-field Infrared Survey Explorer launched on 14 December 2009 aboard a Delta II rocket from Vandenberg Air Force Base. Known as WISE, the telescope provided results hundreds of times more sensitive than IRAS at the shorter wavelengths; it also had an extended mission dubbed NEOWISE beginning in October 2010 after its coolant supply ran out.

A planned mission is NASA's Near-Earth Object Surveillance Mission (NEOSM), which is a successor to the NEOWISE mission.

== 2020 near-miss ==
On 29 January 2020, 23:39:35 UTC, IRAS was expected to pass as closely as 12 meters from the U.S. Air Force's Gravity Gradient Stabilization Experiment (GGSE-4) of 1967, another un-deorbited satellite left aloft; the 14.7-kilometer per second pass had an estimated risk of collision of 5%. Further complications arose from the fact that GGSE-4 was outfitted with an 18 meter long stabilization boom that was in an unknown orientation and may have struck the satellite even if the spacecraft's main body did not. Initial observations from amateur astronomers seemed to indicate that both satellites had survived the pass, with the California-based debris tracking organization LeoLabs later confirming that they had detected no new tracked debris following the incident.

== See also ==
- GGSE-4
- Diffuse Infrared Background Experiment, an infrared sky survey on COBE (1989)
- Infrared astronomy
- List of asteroid-discovering observatories
- List of largest infrared telescopes
- List of minor planet discoverers § Discovering dedicated institutions
- Category:IRAS catalogue objects
