= 209P/LINEAR =

Periodic comet

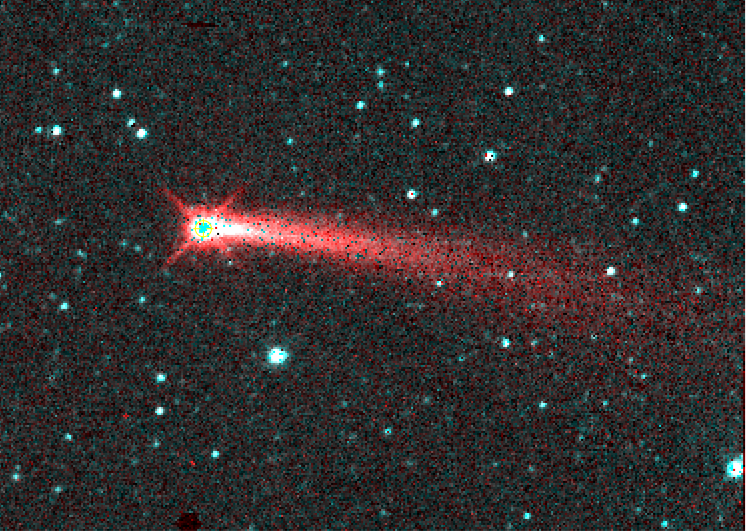

Discovery
- Discovered by: LINEAR; 1.0-m reflector
- Discovery date: 3 February 2004 (asteroidal); 30 March 2004 (tail)

Designations
- MPC designation: P/2004 CB, P/2008 X2

Orbital characteristics
- Epoch: 2014-May-23 (JD 2456800.5)
- Observation arc: 20.79 years (Note: Observation arc from the Minor Planet Center database covering dates from 3 December 2003 until 15 September 2024.)
- Earliest precovery date: 3 December 2003
- Number of observations: 2,883
- Aphelion: 4.952 AU (Q)
- Perihelion: 0.9695 AU (q)
- Semi-major axis: 2.961 AU (a)
- Eccentricity: 0.67258
- Orbital period: 5.09 yr
- Inclination: 21.243°
- Last perihelion: 14 July 2024
- Next perihelion: 14 August 2029
- Earth MOID: 0.05 AU (7,500,000 km)

Physical characteristics
- Dimensions: 3.9 × 2.7 × 2.6 km
- Synodic rotation period: 10.9 hours
- Comet total magnitude (M1): 18.1

209P/LINEAR is a periodic comet with an orbital period of 5.1 years. The comet has extremely low activity for its size and is probably in the process of evolving into an extinct comet. It will next come to perihelion in August 2029.

== Observational history ==
The comet discovered on 3 February 2004 by Lincoln Near-Earth Asteroid Research (LINEAR) using a 1.0-metre (39 in) reflector. Initially it was observed without a coma and named 2004 CB as a minor planet or asteroid, but in March 2004 Robert H. McNaught observed a comet tail which confirmed it as a comet. It was given the permanent number 209P on 12 December 2008 as it was the second observed appearance of the comet. Prediscovery images of the comet, dating back to December 2003, were found during 2009.

209P/LINEAR came to perihelion (closest approach to the Sun) on 6 May 2014. On 29 May 2014 the comet passed 0.0554 AU (8,290,000 km; 5,150,000 mi) from Earth, but only brightened to about apparent magnitude 12. The 2014 Earth approach was the 9th closest known comet approach to Earth. The close approach allowed the comet nucleus to be imaged by Arecibo, producing the most detailed radar image of a comet nucleus to that date. The radar imaging showed the comet nucleus is elongated and about 2.4 km by 3 km in size, later refined to 3.9 × 2.7 × 2.6 km. No evidence of large dust particles were detected in the coma. The comet also had very low water production, (2.5±0.2)×10^{25} mol/s, from an active area measuring just 0.007 km^{2}.

209P/LINEAR was recovered on 31 December 2018 at magnitude 19.2 by Hidetaka Sato.

== Associated meteor showers ==
Preliminary results by Esko Lyytinen and Peter Jenniskens, later confirmed by other researchers, predicted 209P/LINEAR might a big meteor shower which would come from the constellation Camelopardalis on the night of 23/24 May 2014. It was possible that there could be 100 to 400 meteors per hour. All the trails from the comet from 1803 through 1924 were expected to intersect Earth's orbit during May 2014. The peak activity was expected to occur around 24 May 2014 7h UT when dust trails produced from past returns of the comet could pass 0.0002 AU (30,000 km; 19,000 mi) from Earth. The 2014 Camelopardalids only generated 10–15 visual meteors per hour. But the expected radiant and date of visual maximum were correctly predicted. The shower peaked around 6h UT on 24 May 2014. The Canadian Meteor Orbit Radar (CMOR) detected the shower using HF/VHF radar echos but the particles were too small for visual detection. Earth encountered the 1939 stream around 24 May 2019 8h UT with a ZHR of ~5. The Eta Aquariids also occur at this time of year.

The comet has also being suggested to be the parent body of the lambda Draconids, which is active from April 24 to June 4, and peaks around May 12. However it is possible that it is the same shower as the Camelopardalids.

209P/LINEAR may also be the source of the weak 6–14 June meteor shower "sigma Ursae Majorids" (SIM #677).

== Notes ==
Numbered comets
Previous; 208P/McMillan	209P/LINEAR	Next; 210P/Christensen
