= Eric J. Christensen =

American astronomer

Eric James Christensen (born in 1977) is an American astronomer and a discoverer of comets. Since 2023, he works as an Observing Specialist Manager at the Vera C. Rubin Observatory. Before this, he was a staff scientist with the Catalina Sky Survey (CSS), where he was responsible for the survey's near-Earth object operation.

== Career ==
Christensen holds a BFA from the University of Arizona, with a concentration in ceramic sculpture.

In 2003, Christensen joined the Catalina Sky Survey (CSS) near Tucson, Arizona, as an observer. He was involved in software development during a major equipment upgrade at the observatory. Around 2007, Christensen left CSS to work at the Gemini South telescope in Chile as part of the science operations team, including hunting for meteorites in the Atacama Desert.

In 2012, Christensen returned to CSS as a survey operations manager. For ten years, he was the director of the survey's near-Earth object (NEO) operations, including observing, software development, cadence optimization, telescope and instrument maintenance and collimation, survey modeling and optimization, and project management.

In August 2023, Christensen returned to Chile with his family to join the Vera C. Rubin Observatory as an observing specialist manager. The telescope is expected to see first light in January 2025, and start survey operations in August 2025.

=== Discoveries ===
Numbered comets

- 164P/Christensen
- 170P/Christensen
- 210P/Christensen
- 266P/Christensen
- 286P/Christensen
- 287P/Christensen
- 298P/Christensen
- 316P/LONEOS-Christensen
- 383P/Christensen
- 411P/Christensen
- 422P/Christensen
- 438P/Christensen
- 443P/PANSTARRS–Christensen
- 451P/Christensen
- 495P/Christensen

Unnumbered comets

- C/2005 B1 (Christensen)
- C/2005 O2 (Christensen)
- C/2005 W2 (Christensen)
- C/2006 F2 (Christensen)
- C/2006 W3 (Christensen)
- C/2006 YC (Catalina–Christensen)
- C/2013 K1 (Christensen)
- C/2014 H1 (Christensen)
- C/2014 M2 (Christensen)
- C/2014 W7 (Christensen)
- P/2022 E1 (Christensen)

=== Awards and honors ===
Asteroid 13858 Ericchristensen, discovered by the Catalina Sky Survey in 1999, was named in his honor. The official naming citation was published by the Minor Planet Center on 22 July 2013 (M.P.C. 84377).
