= 210P/Christensen =

Jupiter-family comet

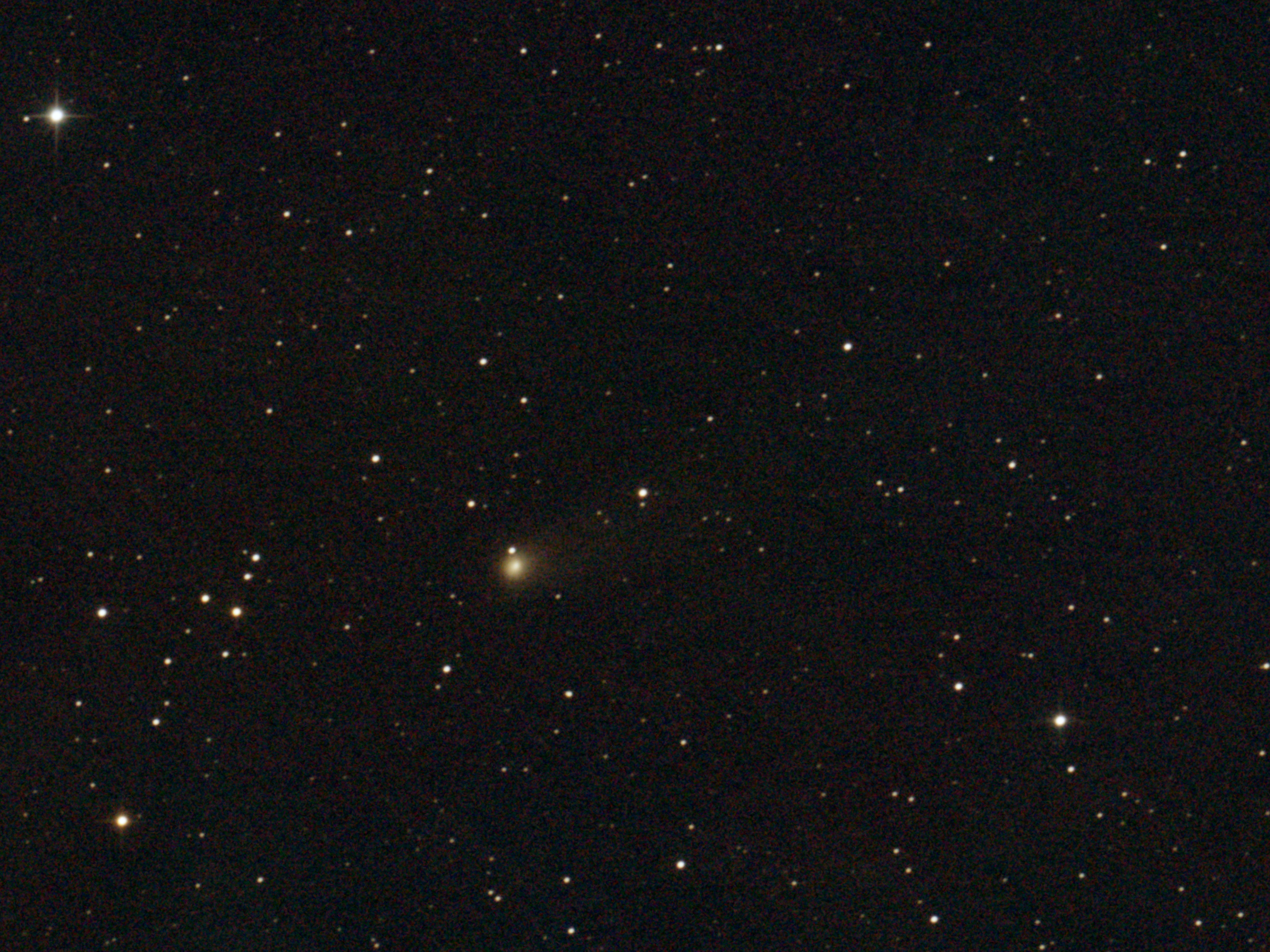
- Comet 210P/Christensen imaged from an 8-in reflector on 1 December 2025

Discovery
- Discovered by: Eric J. Christensen
- Discovery site: Catalina Sky Survey
- Discovery date: 26 May 2003

Designations
- MPC designation: P/2003 K2, P/2008 X4
- Alternative designations: Christensen 1

Orbital characteristics
- Epoch: 21 November 2025 (JD 2461000.5)
- Observation arc: 22.99 years (Note: Observation arc from the Minor Planet Center database covering dates from 26 May 2003 until 22 May 2026.)
- Number of observations: 1,329
- Aphelion: 5.797 AU
- Perihelion: 0.524 AU
- Semi-major axis: 3.161 AU
- Eccentricity: 0.83408
- Orbital period: 5.619 years
- Inclination: 10.287°
- Longitude of ascending node: 93.797°
- Argument of periapsis: 345.95°
- Mean anomaly: 359.69°
- Last perihelion: 22 November 2025
- Next perihelion: 6 July 2031
- T_{Jupiter}: 2.492
- Earth MOID: 0.170 AU
- Jupiter MOID: 0.019 AU

Physical characteristics
- Dimensions: 0.87 km (0.54 mi)
- Comet total magnitude (M1): 14.9

210P/Christensen is a Jupiter-family comet with an orbital period of 5.7 years. It was discovered by Eric J. Christensen on 26 May 2003 in images taken by the Catalina Sky Survey and recovered in images obtained by STEREO, the first time a single-apparition comet was recovered by a spacecraft.

== Observational history ==
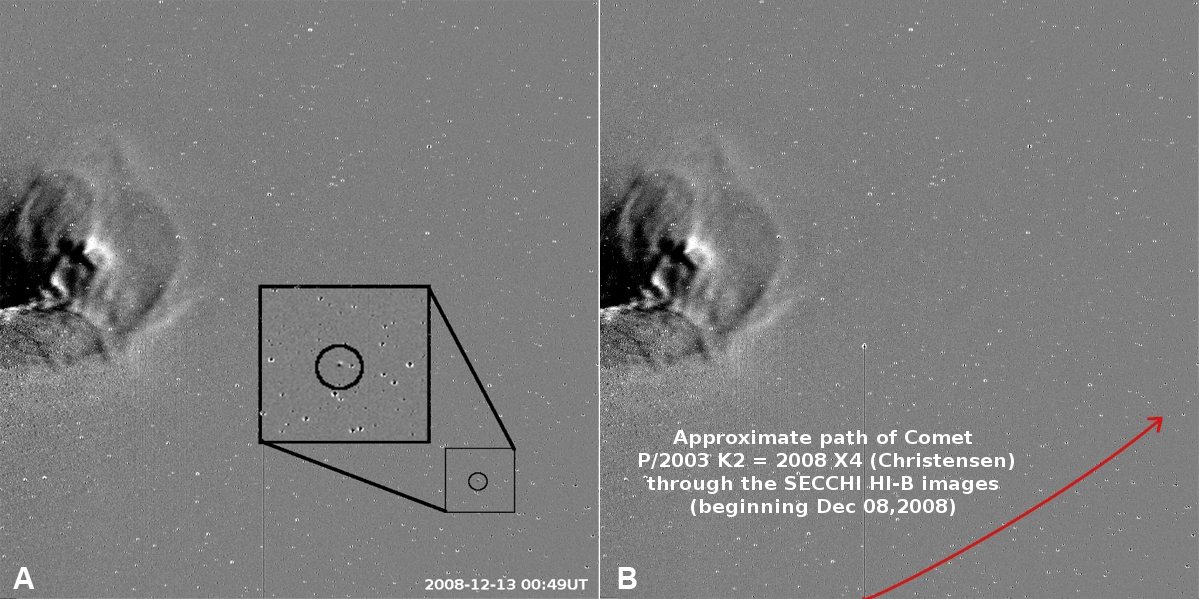
Recovery image of the comet by STEREO on 13 December 2008

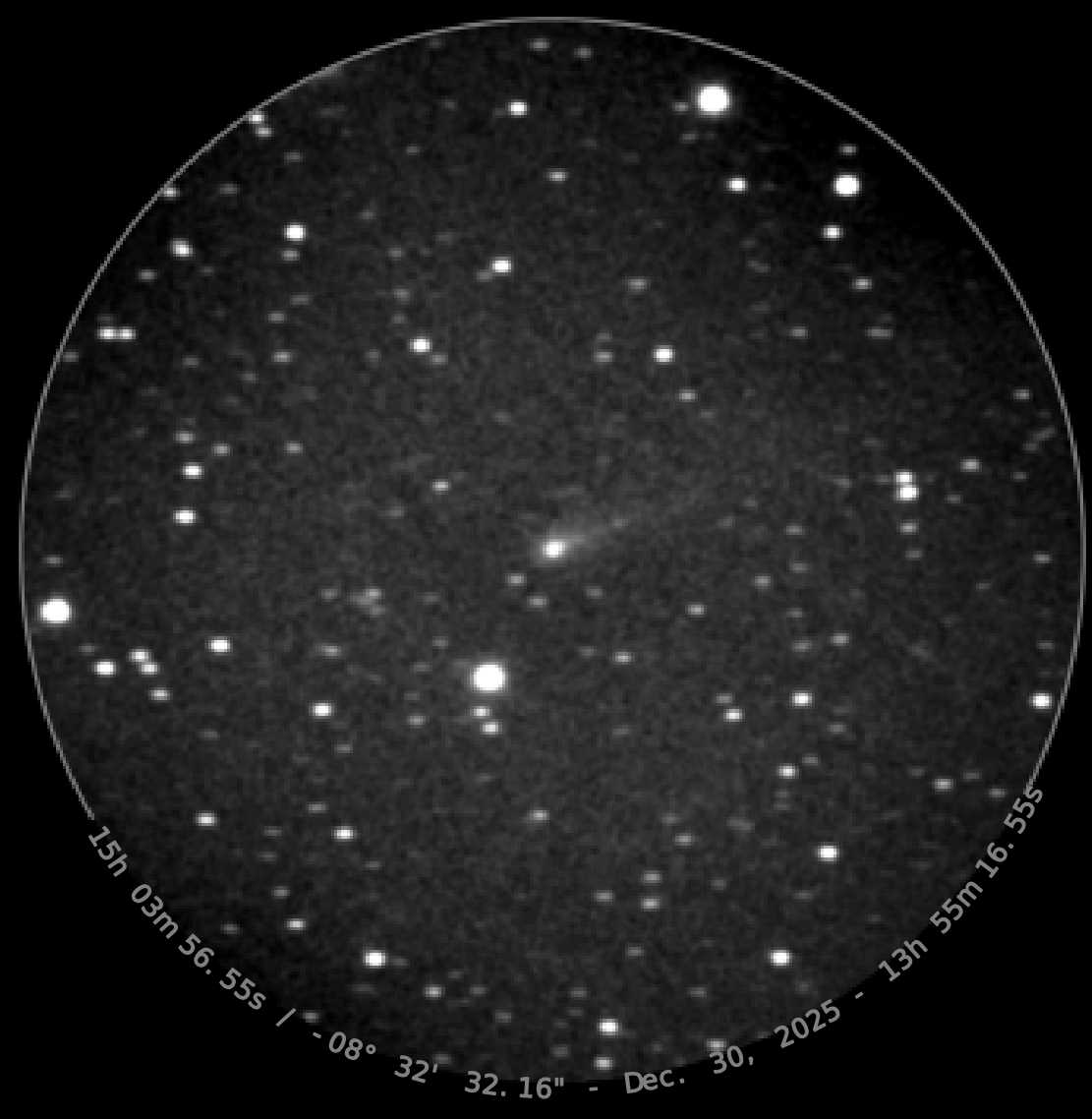
210P/Christensen on 30 December 2025 13:45 UT at magnitude 13.8 with a Unistellar smart telescope

Eric J. Christensen discovered the comet on 26 May 2003 in images taken with the 0.7-m Schmidt telescope of the Catalina Sky Survey. The comet had an estimated magnitude of 14.6 and a coma with an estimated diameter between 10 and 35 arcseconds and a faint tail. Further observations revealed the comet had a short orbital period.

In mid December 2008, Australian comet-hunter Alan Watson spotted in the STEREO/SECCHI Heliospheric Imager ("HI") HI-1B data a cometary object. Veteran German comet hunter Rainer Kracht recorded a few positions of the comet in the data and produced a set of very approximate orbital elements for it. Maik Meyer noticed the similarity of these orbital elements to those of P/2003 K2 and the link was confirmed by Brian G. Marsden. This was the first recovery of a single-apparition comet by a spacecraft. The comet was observed from the ground on 14 December 2008, located low and in bright twilight, and on 31 December 2008 it had an estimated magnitude of 10.5.

During the 2025 apparition, the comet passed 0.43 AU (64 million km; 40 million mi) from Earth on 8 November 2025 but was only 20 degrees from the Sun. It came to perihelion on 22 November 2025. It was visible in SWAN in November 2025 around magnitude 11. On 26 November it was visible low in the morning twilight, with a faint tail about a quarter of a degree long and an estimated magnitude of 9.5.

The comet has been locked in a 2:1 orbital resonance with Jupiter for the last 10,000 years and could be of asteroidal origin. Its nucleus is estimated to be about 1.74 km (1.08 mi) in diameter. It makes close approaches to Venus and on 17 September 1929 passed 0.032 AU (4.8 million km; 3.0 million mi) from Venus.

== Notes ==
Numbered comets
Previous; 209P/LINEAR	210P/Christensen	Next; 211P/Hill
