= 126P/IRAS =

Jupiter-family comet

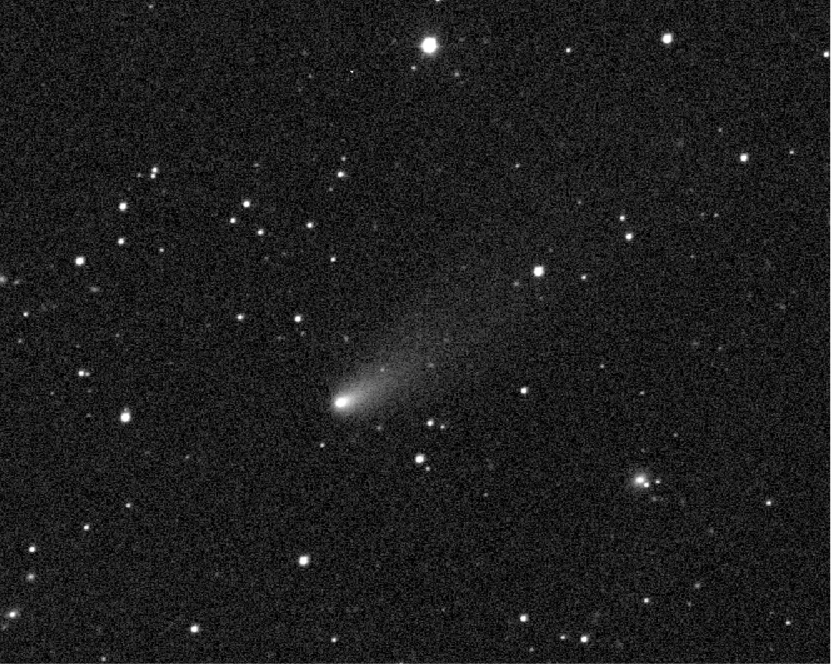
- Comet 126P/IRAS photographed from the Zwicky Transient Facility on 27 July 2023

Discovery
- Discovered by: Infrared Astronomical Satellite
- Discovery date: 26 July 1983

Designations
- MPC designation: P/1983 M1, P/1996 P1
- Alternative designations: 1983 XIV, 1983j

Orbital characteristics
- Epoch: 27 May 2021 (JD 2459361.5)
- Observation arc: 40.63 years (Note: Observation arc from the Minor Planet Center database covering dates from 30 June 1983 until 15 February 2024.)
- Earliest precovery date: 30 June 1983
- Number of observations: 1,902
- Aphelion: 9.573 AU
- Perihelion: 1.713 AU
- Semi-major axis: 5.640 AU
- Eccentricity: 0.69628
- Orbital period: 13.395 years
- Inclination: 45.869°
- Longitude of ascending node: 357.86°
- Argument of periapsis: 356.52°
- Mean anomaly: 303.38°
- Last perihelion: 5 July 2023
- Next perihelion: 11 October 2036
- T_{Jupiter}: 1.964
- Earth MOID: 0.711 AU
- Jupiter MOID: 2.771 AU

Physical characteristics
- Dimensions: 1.57±0.14 km
- Mean density: 580±90 kg/m^{3}
- Geometric albedo: 0.15±0.03
- Comet total magnitude (M1): 11.8
- Comet nuclear magnitude (M2): 14.9

126P/IRAS is a Jupiter-family comet with an orbital period of 13.4 years. It was discovered in images taken by the Infrared Astronomical Satellite (IRAS) on 28 July 1983 by J. Davies. The discovery was confirmed with images taken with the 1.2-m Schmidt telescope at Palomar Observatory.

== Observational history ==
Upon discovery the comet had an apparent magnitude of 15 and appeared stellar in appearance. The comet brightened and in mid September 1983 reached an apparent magnitude of 11 while a tail 3.5 arcminutes long was observed. Brian G. Marsden computed its orbit and found it is a short period comet with an orbital period of 13.32 years. The comet was observed again during its next apparition in 1996, when it brightened up to magnitude of about 11 in September 1996 and faded to about 12 in October. The comet was observed during its 2010 and 2023 apparitions.

During the 1996 apparition, the comet was observed by the Infrared Space Observatory (ISO) when it was near perihelion. At the time, the comet had a 15 arcminute long tail in mid-infrared. The Midcourse Space Experiment (MSX) satellite also observed the comet in infrared.

== Physical characteristics ==
The surface was covered with dust grains smaller than 5 microns, a grain size similar to Halley's Comet. Estimates of the dust mass loss rate during its 1996 apparition was between 150–600 kg/s while the comet shed 3.3 times more dust mass than gas mass, however other studies showed the rate to be much lower at only 50 kg/s. The albedo of the dust grain in the tail was estimated to be 0.15±0.03. The nucleus is estimated to have a radius of 1.57 ± 0.14 km (0.976 ± 0.087 mi) based on infrared observations.

== Possible meteor shower ==
It has been proposed that meteoroids expelled from the comet about 13,000 years ago could reach Earth, producing a diffuse meteor shower.

== Notes ==
Numbered comets
| Previous; 125P/Spacewatch | 126P/IRAS | Next; 127P/Holt–Olmstead |
