= C/2002 V1 (NEAT) =

Sungrazing comet

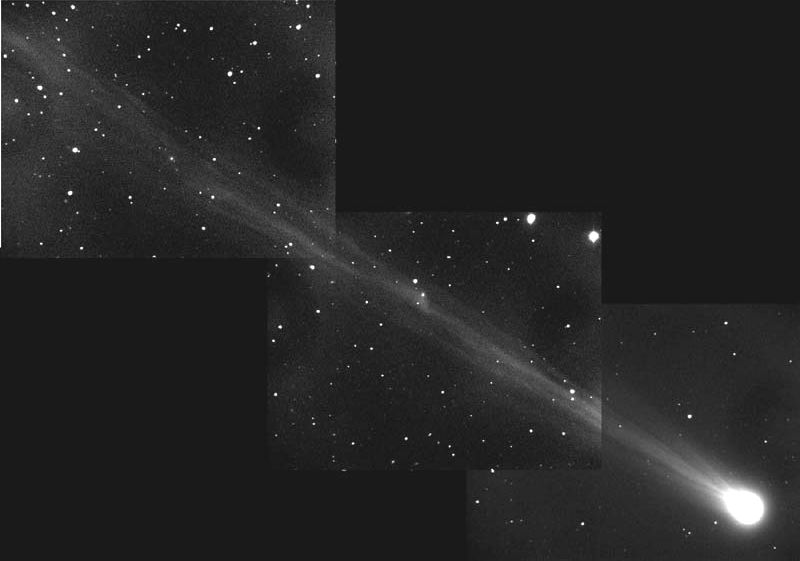
- Comet NEAT on February 1, 2003

Discovery
- Discovered by: S. H. Pravdo
- Discovery site: NEAT–Haleakalā (608)
- Discovery date: 6 November 2002

Designations
- Alternative designations: CK02V010

Orbital characteristics
- Epoch: 26 December 2002 (JD 2452634.5)
- Observation arc: 350 days
- Number of observations: 1,510
- Aphelion: 2,020 AU
- Perihelion: 0.0992 AU
- Semi-major axis: 1,010 AU
- Eccentricity: 0.999902
- Orbital period: 32,123 years
- Inclination: 81.706°
- Longitude of ascending node: 64.088°
- Argument of periapsis: 152.170°
- Last perihelion: 18 February 2003
- T_{Jupiter}: 0.061
- Earth MOID: 0.1511 AU
- Jupiter MOID: 0.9175 AU

Physical characteristics
- Mean radius: 1.57±0.16 km
- Mass: 6.6×10^{12} kg
- Mean density: 470±70 kg/m^{3}
- Comet total magnitude (M1): 6.0
- Comet nuclear magnitude (M2): 13.8
- Apparent magnitude: –0.5 (2003 apparition)

Comet NEAT, formally designated as C/2002 V1, is a non-periodic comet that appeared in November 2002. The comet peaked with an apparent magnitude of approximately –0.5, making it the eighth-brightest comet seen since 1935. It was seen by SOHO in February 2003. At perihelion the comet was only 0.0992 AU (14.84 million km) from the Sun, where it was initially expected to be disintegrated, however reanalysis of its orbit has indicated that it has survived many of its previous perihelia, thus making breakup unlikely.

== Observations ==
Comet NEAT was discovered from the 1.2 m (3.9 ft) Schmidt telescope of the Haleakalā Observatory as a magnitude-17 object on 6 November 2002 on the course of the Near-Earth Asteroid Tracking (NEAT) survey. The comet became visible in the naked eye by January 2003.

The comet was hit by a coronal mass ejection during its perihelion on 18 February 2003, where it was only 5.7 degrees from the Sun from Earth's perspective. Speculation that the CME was caused by the comet's close approach was dismissed by scientists; comets and CMEs occur close together in time only by coincidence, and there were 56 CMEs recorded in February 2003. C/2002 V1 (NEAT) appeared impressive as viewed by the Solar and Heliospheric Observatory (SOHO) as a result of the forward scattering of light off of the dust in the coma and tail. The comet remained observable with telescopes until October 2003.

The orbit of a long-period comet is properly obtained when the osculating orbit is computed at an epoch after leaving the planetary region and is calculated with respect to the center of mass of the Solar System. Using JPL Horizons, the barycentric orbital elements for epoch 2020-Jan-01 generate a semi-major axis of 1,100 AU, an apoapsis distance of 2,230 AU, and a period of approximately 37,000 years.
