= 163P/NEAT =

Jupiter-family comet

Discovery
- Discovered by: Near-Earth Asteroid Tracking (644)
- Discovery site: Palomar Observatory
- Discovery date: 5 November 2004

Designations
- MPC designation: P/2004 V4
- Alternative designations: NEAT 21

Orbital characteristics
- Epoch: 21 November 2025 (JD 2461000.5)
- Observation arc: 29.39 years
- Earliest precovery date: 24 October 1990
- Number of observations: 384
- Aphelion: 5.465 AU
- Perihelion: 2.055 AU
- Semi-major axis: 3.760 AU
- Eccentricity: 0.45348
- Orbital period: 7.29 years
- Inclination: 12.724°
- Longitude of ascending node: 102.07°
- Argument of periapsis: 349.67°
- Mean anomaly: 310.26°
- Last perihelion: 5 August 2019
- Next perihelion: 24 November 2026
- T_{Jupiter}: 2.858
- Earth MOID: 0.946 AU
- Jupiter MOID: 0.094 AU

Physical characteristics
- Mean radius: 1.39 km (0.86 mi)
- Comet total magnitude (M1): 11.8
- Comet nuclear magnitude (M2): 16.5

163P/NEAT is a Jupiter-family comet roughly 3 km in diameter with a 7.3 year orbit around the Sun. It was discovered on 5 November 2004 by Near-Earth Asteroid Tracking (NEAT) using the 1.2 meter Samuel Oschin telescope at the Palomar Observatory.

It was recovered on 19 September 2026. It will come to perihelion on 24 November 2026 when it will be 2.1 AU from the Sun, and is only expected to reach magnitude 18 placing it outside the range of most amateur astronomers.

== Observational history ==
Precovery images of the comet were found by Maik Meyer in December 2004. There were two images from 1997, two images from 1991, and three images from 1990. It is subsequently given a permanent numerical designation (163P) on 18 January 2005.

During the 2005 perihelion passage the comet brightened to an apparent magnitude of about 16. Ahead of its 2012 apparition, the comet was observed three times on 3 November 2011 by the Palomar Transient Factory (PTF) survey while it was a 20th-magnitude object at a distance of 1.5 AU (220 million km) from the Sun.

== Orbit ==
Around 17 November 2114, the comet will pass about 0.117 AU (17.5 million km; 10.9 million mi) from Jupiter.

== Physical characteristics ==
Infrared observations obtained by the Spitzer Space Telescope between 2006 and 2007 revealed that the nucleus of 163P/NEAT is about 1.39 km (0.86 mi) in radius.

Numbered comets
Previous; 162P/Siding Spring	163P/NEAT	Next; 164P/Christensen
