= List of meteor showers =

Named meteor showers recur at approximately the same dates each year. They appear to radiate from a certain point in the sky, known as the radiant, and vary in the speed, frequency and brightness of the meteors. As of March 2026, there are 113 established meteor showers.

== Table of meteor showers ==
Dates are given for 2026. The dates will vary from year to year due to the leap year cycle. This list includes showers with radiants in both the northern and southern hemispheres. There is some overlap, but generally showers whose radiants have positive declinations are best seen from the northern hemisphere, and those with negative declinations are best observed from the southern hemisphere.

| Name | Dates (as of 2026) | Peak (as of 2026) | Solar longitude (λ_{☉}°) | RA (hours) | Dec (degrees) | V_{entry} (km/s) | ZHR | Rating | Parent body |
|---|---|---|---|---|---|---|---|---|---|
| Antihelion Source | 10 Dec – 20 Sep | multiple | | varies | varies | 30 | 4 | medium | N/A (various comets) |
| Quadrantids | 28 Dec – 12 Jan | 3 Jan | 283.15 | 15.3 | +49 | 41 | 80 | bright | (196256) 2003 EH1 ? |
| Gamma Ursae Minorids | 10 Jan – 22 Jan | 18 Jan | 298 | 15.2 | +67 | 31 | 3 | medium | undiscovered (short period) |
| Alpha Centaurids | 31 Jan – 20 Feb | 8 Feb | 319.4 | 14.1 | −58 | 58 | 6 | bright | undiscovered |
| Lyrids | 14 Apr – 30 Apr | 22 Apr | 32.32 | 18.1 | +34 | 49 | 18 | bright | C/1861 G1 (Thatcher) |
| Pi Puppids | 15 Apr – 28 Apr | 24 Apr | 33.5 | 7.3 | −45 | 18 | variable | bright | 26P/Grigg–Skjellerup |
| Eta Aquariids | 19 Apr – 28 May | 6 May | 45.5 | 22.5 | −1 | 66 | 50 | bright | 1P/Halley |
| Eta Lyrids | 3 May – 14 May | 11 May | 50.0 | 19.4 | +43 | 43 | 3 | medium | C/1983 H1 (IRAS-Araki-Alcock) |
| Daytime Arietids | 14 May – 24 Jun | 7 Jun | 76.7 | 2.9 | +24 | 38 | 30 | medium | 1566 Icarus ? |
| June Bootids | 22 Jun – 2 Jul | 22 Jun | 90.3 | 14.7 | +48 | 18 | variable | bright | 7P/Pons-Winnecke |
| July Pegasids | 1 Jul – 20 Jul | 10 Jul | 108.0 | 23.1 | +11 | 63 | 3 | medium | C/1979 Y1 (Bradfield) |
| July Gamma Draconids | 25 Jul – 31 Jul | 28 Jul | 125.13 | 18.7 | +51 | 27 | 5 | medium | |
| Southern Delta Aquariids | 12 Jul – 23 Aug | 31 Jul | 128 | 22.7 | −16 | 41 | 25 | bright | P/2008 Y12 (SOHO) |
| Alpha Capricornids | 3 Jul – 15 Aug | 31 Jul | 128 | 20.5 | −10 | 23 | 5 | bright | 169P/NEAT |
| Eta Eridanids | 31 Jul – 19 Aug | 7 Aug | 135.0 | 2.7 | −11 | 64 | 3 | medium | C/1852 K1 (Chacornac) |
| Perseids | 17 Jul – 24 Aug | 13 Aug | 140.0 | 3.2 | +58 | 59 | 100 | bright | 109P/Swift-Tuttle |
| Kappa Cygnids | 3 Aug – 28 Aug | 17 Aug | 144 | 19.1 | +59 | 23 | 3 | medium | undiscovered (possibly related to 2002 GJ8) |
| Aurigids | 28 Aug – 5 Sep | 1 Sep | 158.6 | 6.1 | +39 | 66 | 6 | bright | C/1911 N1 (Kiess) |
| September Epsilon Perseids | 5 Sep – 21 Sep | 9 Sep | 166.7 | 3.2 | +40 | 64 | 8 | bright | undiscovered (moderate period) |
| September Lyncids | 10 Sep – 8 Oct | 13 Sep | 170 | 7.5 | +56 | 60 | 3 | medium | |
| Daytime Sextantids | 20 Sep – 6 Oct | 1 Oct | 188 | 10.4 | −2 | 32 | 5 | bright | (155140) 2005 UD |
| October Camelopardalids | 5 Oct – 6 Oct | 6 Oct | 192.58 | 10.9 | +79 | 47 | 5 | bright | undiscovered (long period) |
| October Draconids | 6 Oct – 10 Oct | 9 Oct | 195.4 | 17.5 | +54 | 20 | 5 | medium | 21P/Giacobini-Zinner |
| Epsilon Geminids | 14 Oct – 27 Oct | 18 Oct | 205 | 6.8 | +27 | 70 | 3 | medium | C/1964 N1 (Ikeya) |
| Orionids | 2 Oct – 7 Nov | 21 Oct | 208 | 6.3 | +16 | 66 | 20 | bright | 1P/Halley |
| Leonis Minorids | 19 Oct – 27 Oct | 24 Oct | 211 | 10.8 | +37 | 62 | 2 | medium | C/1739 K1 |
| Southern Taurids | 20 Sep – 20 Nov | 5 Nov | 223 | 3.5 | +15 | 27 | 7 | bright | 2P/Encke |
| Northern Taurids | 20 Oct – 10 Dec | 12 Nov | 230 | 3.9 | +22 | 29 | 5 | bright | 2004 TG_{10} |
| Leonids | 6 Nov – 30 Nov | 17 Nov | 235.27 | 10.1 | +22 | 71 | 15 | bright | 55P/Tempel–Tuttle |
| Alpha Monocerotids | 15 Nov – 25 Nov | 22 Nov | 239.32 | 7.8 | +1 | 65 | variable | bright | undiscovered (long period) |
| November Orionids | 13 Nov – 6 Dec | 28 Nov | 246 | 6.1 | +16 | 44 | 3 | medium | undiscovered (moderate period, probably disintegrated) |
| Phoenicids | 1 Dec – 5 Dec | 2 Dec | 249.5 | 0.5 | −27 | 15 | variable | medium | 289P/Blanpain |
| Puppid-Velids | 1 Dec – 15 Dec | multiple | 255 | 8.2 | −45 | 44 | 10 | medium | undiscovered |
| Monocerotids | 1 Dec – 19 Dec | 9 Dec | 257 | 6.7 | +8 | 41 | 3 | medium | C/1917 F1 (Mellish) |
| Sigma Hydrids | 3 Dec – 20 Dec | 9 Dec | 257 | 8.3 | +2 | 58 | 7 | medium | possibly C/2023 P1 (Nishimura) |
| Geminids | 4 Dec – 20 Dec | 14 Dec | 262.2 | 7.5 | +33 | 35 | 150 | medium | 3200 Phaethon |
| Comae Berenicids | 4 Dec – 30 Jan | 23 Dec | 271 | 10.9 | +29 | 65 | 3 | medium | undiscovered (moderate period) |
| Ursids | 17 Dec – 26 Dec | 22 Dec | 270.7 | 14.5 | +76 | 33 | 10 | medium | 8P/Tuttle |

== Table of provisionally named meteor showers ==
This is a list of provisional names proposed by authors for showers that have only received a designation by the IAU Meteor Data Center.

| Designation | Provisional name | Provisional code | Provisional number | Sol (degrees) | RA (degrees) | Dec (degrees) | V_{g} (km/s) |
|---|---|---|---|---|---|---|---|
| M2023-D1 | Jan. alpha-Bootids | JAB | 1213 | 282.6 | 218.8 | +28.2 | 58.9 |
| M2023-D2 | theta-Dracondis | TDR | 1214 | 296.3 | 235.2 | +60.7 | 32.8 |
| M2023-F1 | Aug. nu-Ursae Majorids | ANU | 1215 | 239.2 | 155.8 | +59.7 | 55.0 |
| M2023-F2 | chi Delphinids | CHD | 1216 | 67.3 | 311.8 | +9.1 | 63.3 |
| M2023-F3 | xi Serpentids | XIS | 1217 | 22.1 | 266.3 | -15.9 | 65.9 |
| M2023-F4 | Sep. beta Ursae-Majorids | SBU | 1218 | 277.0 | 164.3 | +54.0 | 48.0 |
| M2023-F5 | delta-Leonids | DEO | 1219 | 266.1 | 164.3 | +20.5 | 68.0 |
| M2023-K1 | 51-Sagittids | FSG | 1220 | 54.54 | 300.3 | +17.8 | 59.7 |
| M2023-O1 | nu-Herculids | NUH | 1221 | 25.8 | 270.5 | +30.7 | 48.9 |
| M2023-V1 | lambda-Sculptorids | LSC | 1222 | 160.0 | 7.1 | -38.8 | 10.0 |
| M2024-H1 | iota-Herculids | IHE | 1223 | 37.8 | 261.1 | +47.3 | 35.6 |
| M2024-N1 | psi-Fornacids | PFO | 1224 | 102.88 | 44.26 | -38.21 | 51.6 |
| M2024-P1 | nu-Capricornids | NUC | 1225 | 139.05 | 306.65 | -11.38 | 18.3 |
| M2024-S1 | zeta-Ursae Minorids | ZUM | 1226 | 181.90 | 238.27 | +77.26 | 32.0 |
| M2024-U1 | theta-Lyrids | THL | 1227 | 213.55 | 288.87 | +37.01 | 13.1 |
| M2024-Y1 | September psi-Cassiopeiids | SPC | 1228 | 162.10 | 20.6 | +73.5 | 46.4 |
| M2025-B1 | theta-Pegasids | TAP | 1229 | 217.7 | 336.6 | +9.1 | 11.0 |
| M2025-F1 | March zeta-Puppids | MZP | 1230 | 359.0 | 121.9 | -37.2 | 15.1 |
| M2025-K1 | xi-Octantids | XOC | 1231 | 62.3 | 349.1 | -79.8 | 40.6 |
| M2025-L1 | (tau-Herculids) | TAH | 1232 | 69.5 | 197.0 | +51.5 | 12.1 |
| M2025-L2 | (tau-Herculids) | TAH | 1233 | 71.5 | 203.1 | +7.5 | 11.7 |
| M2025-O1 | delta-Equuleids | DQU | 1234 | 92.2 | 319.4 | +9.2 | 56.9 |
| M2025-O2 | delta-Tucanids | DTU | 1235 | 85.2 | 330.0 | -63.8 | 43.8 |
| M2025-P1 | July upsilon-Cetids | JUC | 1236 | 125.6 | 29.5 | -21.1 | 61.4 |
| M2025-Q1 | August Arietids | AAR | 1237 | 153.5 | 47.5 | +11.5 | 68.3 |
| M2025-S1 | September Delphinids | SDE | 1238 | 172.9 | 308.8 | +9.7 | 12.5 |
| M2025-S2 | Horologiids | HOR | 1239 | 175.3 | 31.6 | -66.9 | 20.6 |
| M2025-U1 | October gamma-Piscids | OGP | 1240 | 209.6 | 359.1 | +11.4 | 14.3 |

== See also ==
- Lists of astronomical objects

== Sources ==
This list of meteor streams and peak activity times is based on data from the International Meteor Organization while most of the parent body associations are from Gary W. Kronk book, Meteor Showers: A Descriptive Catalog, Enslow Publishers, New Jersey, ISBN 0-89490-071-4, and from Peter Jenniskens's book, "Altas of Earth's Meteor Showers", Elsevier, Amsterdam, The Netherlands, ISBN 978-0-443-23577-1.
