= Alpha Monocerotids =

Meteor shower

- Celestial map of Monoceros
- Parent body: Unknown

Radiant
- Constellation: Monoceros
- Right ascension: 7^{h} 48^{m} 00^{s}
- Declination: +1° 00′ 00″

Properties
- Occurs during: November 15 to November 25
- Date of peak: November 21-22
- Velocity: 65 km/s
- Zenithal hourly rate: variable

The Alpha Monocerotids is a meteor shower active from 15 to 25 November, with its peak occurring on 21 or 22 November. The speed of its meteors is 65 km/s, which is close to the maximum possible speed for meteors of about 73 km/s (see Specific energy#Astrodynamics). Normally it has a low Zenithal Hourly Rate (ZHR), but occasionally it produces much more intense meteor storms that last less than an hour: such outbursts were observed in 1925, 1935, 1985, and 1995. The 1925 and 1935 storms both reached levels passing 1,000 ZHR.

Peter Jenniskens predicted the 1995 return based on the hypothesis that these outbursts were caused by the dust trail of a long period comet occasionally wandering in Earth's path due to planetary perturbations. During observations in southern Spain, assisted by a team of observers of the Dutch Meteor Society, Jenniskens confirmed that the meteoroids were moving in a long-period comet orbit. The outburst of 1995 allowed researchers to determine the exact radiant of the swarm and the solar longitude of its peak as well as to confirm the brevity of Alpha Monocerotid outbursts as less than one hour. The parent body, probably a long-period comet, is unknown.

In 2019, Jenniskens and Esko Lyytinen predicted an outburst starting around 04:50 UTC on November 22, 2019 (11:50 p.m. EST November 21). The meteor outburst was predicted to last for roughly 15 minutes, to reach 400 meteors per hour, similar to the rate of the 1995 outburst. However, in the event, though the peak occurred at 05:00 UTC, the rate was much lower than predicted.

== See also ==
- List of meteor showers
