= Kappa Cygnids =

Meteor shower

- Celestial map of Cygnus
- Parent body: Unknown

Radiant
- Constellation: Cygnus (near Kappa Cygni)
- Right ascension: 19^{h} 4^{m} -0^{s}
- Declination: +59° 00′ 00″

Properties
- Occurs during: August 3 to August 25
- Date of peak: August 17
- Velocity: 25 km/s
- Zenithal hourly rate: 3

Kappa Cygnids, abbreviated KCG and IAU shower number 12, was an episodic meteor shower that took place from June to September, peaking around August 13, along with the larger Perseids meteor shower. The radiant of the shower emerged from the antihelion source in late June and moves upwards to Cygnus in July. In early August, the radiant is just west of the star Vega and elongated in a north-south direction. The shower then turns a corner and moves to the east in late August. The Kappa Cygnids are named for the position of the radiant at the peak of the shower, where the meteor shower will appear to line up in sky by the constellation Cygnus and the star Kappa Cygni.

The Kappa Cygnids are unusual in that they are absent in most years, but appear every 7 years (see table below). The years 2020 and 2021 fit in that sequence. The shower is known for occasional bright fireballs with multiple flares.

The minor planet (361861) 2008 ED69 has the appropriate orbital parameters to explain the Kappa Cygnids shower. As the meteor stream has more combined mass than 2008 ED69, the two may have originated during the fragmentation of a parent body. The observed dispersion of the stream suggests this breakup occurred some time around 4000-1600 BC. The stream passes close to the planet Venus and hence may cause a significant meteor shower on that body.

Year	Active Between	Peak of shower	ZHR
1879	June - September	August 13	3
1893	June - September	August 13	3
1950	June - September	August 13	3
1957	June - September	August 13	3
1978	June - September	August 13	3
1985	June - September	August 13	3
1993	June - September	August 13	3
1999	June - September	August 13	3
2007	June - September	August 13	3
2013	June - September	August 13	3
2014	June - September	August 13	3
2020	June - September	August 13	3
2021	June - September	August 13	3
