= Aquariids =

Aquariids are several meteor showers whose radiant appears to lie in the constellation Aquarius:

- Eta Aquariids
- Kappa Aquariids
- North Delta Aquariids
- North Iota Aquariids
- Southern Delta Aquariids
- South Iota Aquariids
- Tau Aquariids
