= Orionids =

Meteor shower

Orionids (ORI)
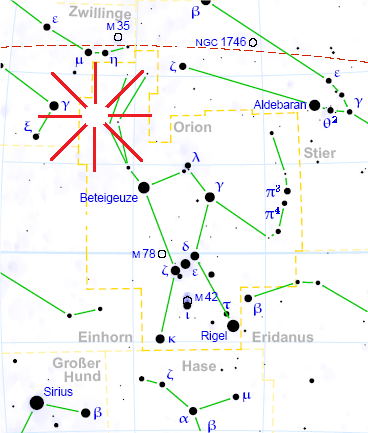
- The radiant of the Orionids is located about 10 degrees northwest of Betelgeuse
- Discovery date: October 1839
- Parent body: 1P/Halley

Radiant
- Constellation: Orion (10 degrees northeast of Betelgeuse)
- Right ascension: 06^{h} 21^{m}
- Declination: +15.6°

Properties
- Occurs during: October 2 – November 7
- Date of peak: October 21
- Velocity: 66.9 km/s
- Zenithal hourly rate: 20

The Orionids meteor shower, often shortened to the Orionids, is one of two meteor showers associated with Halley's Comet (the other one being the Eta Aquariids). The Orionids are named because the point they appear to come from (the radiant) lies in the constellation of Orion. The shower occurs annually, lasting approximately one week in late October. In some years, meteors may occur at rates of 50–70 per hour.

Orionid outbursts occurred in 585, 930, 1436, 1439, 1465, and 1623. The Orionids occur at the ascending node of Halley's comet. The ascending node reached its closest distance to Earth around 800 BCE. Currently Earth approaches Halley's orbit at a distance of 0.154 AU (23.0 million km; 14.3 million mi; 60 LD) during the Orionids. The next outburst might be in 2070 as a result of particles trapped in a 2:13 mean-motion resonance with Jupiter.

== History ==
Meteor showers were connected to comets in the 1800s. E.C. Herrick made an observation in 1839 and 1840 about the activity present in the October night skies. Alexander Herschel produced the first documented record that gave accurate forecasts for the next meteor shower. The Orionids meteor shower is produced by Halley's Comet, which was named after astronomer Edmund Halley and last passed through the inner Solar System in 1986 on its 75–76 year orbit. When the comet passes through the Solar System, the Sun sublimates some of the ice, allowing rock particles to break away from the comet. These particles continue on the comet's trajectory and appear as meteors when they enter Earth's upper atmosphere.

The meteor shower radiant is located in Orion about 10 degrees northeast of Betelgeuse. The Orionids normally peak around October 21–22 and are fast meteors that make atmospheric entry at about 66 km/s (150,000 mph). Halley's comet is also responsible for creating the Eta Aquariids, which occur each May as a result of Earth passing close to the descending node of Halley's comet.

An outburst with a zenithal hourly rate of over 100 occurred on 21 October 2006 as a result of Earth passing through the 1266 BCE, 1198 BCE, and 911 BCE meteoroid streams. In 2015, the meteor shower peaked on October 26.

Year	Activity Date Range	Peak Date	ZHR_{max}
1839	October 8–15		
1864	October 18–20		
1936		October 19	
1981	October 18–21	October 23	20
1984	October 21–24	October 21–24	(flat maximum)
2006	October 2 — November 7	October 21–24	100+
2007	October 20–24	October 21 (predicted)	70
2008	October 15–29	October 20–22 (predicted)	39
2009	October 18–25	October 22	45
2010		October 23	38
2011		October 22	33
2012	October 2 — November 7	October 20 and October 23	43
2013		October 22	~30
2014	October 2 — November 7	October 21	28
2015	October 2 — November 7	October 26	37
2016	October 2 — November 7	October 21	84
2017		October 21	55
2018		October 21	58
2019		October 22	40
2020		October 22	36
2021		October 21	41
2022		October 22	38
2023		October 21	48

Some Orionid showers have had double peaks, as well as plateaus of activity lasting several days.

== Gallery ==
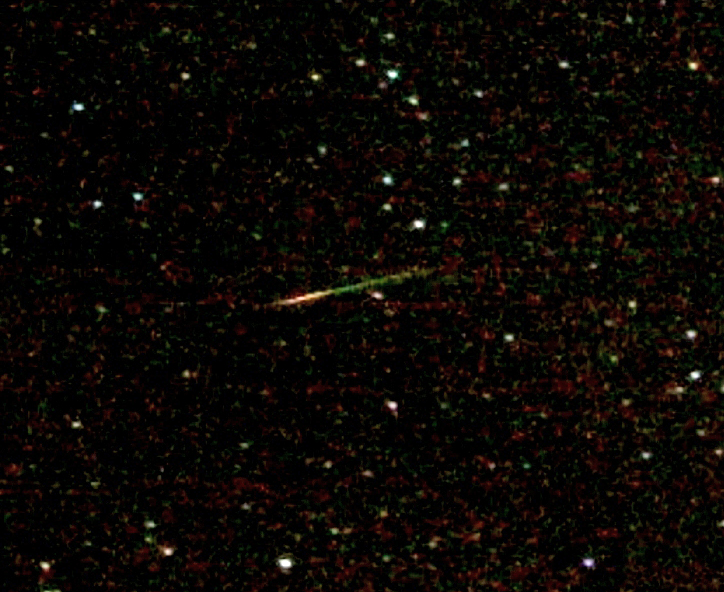
An Orionid near the center.

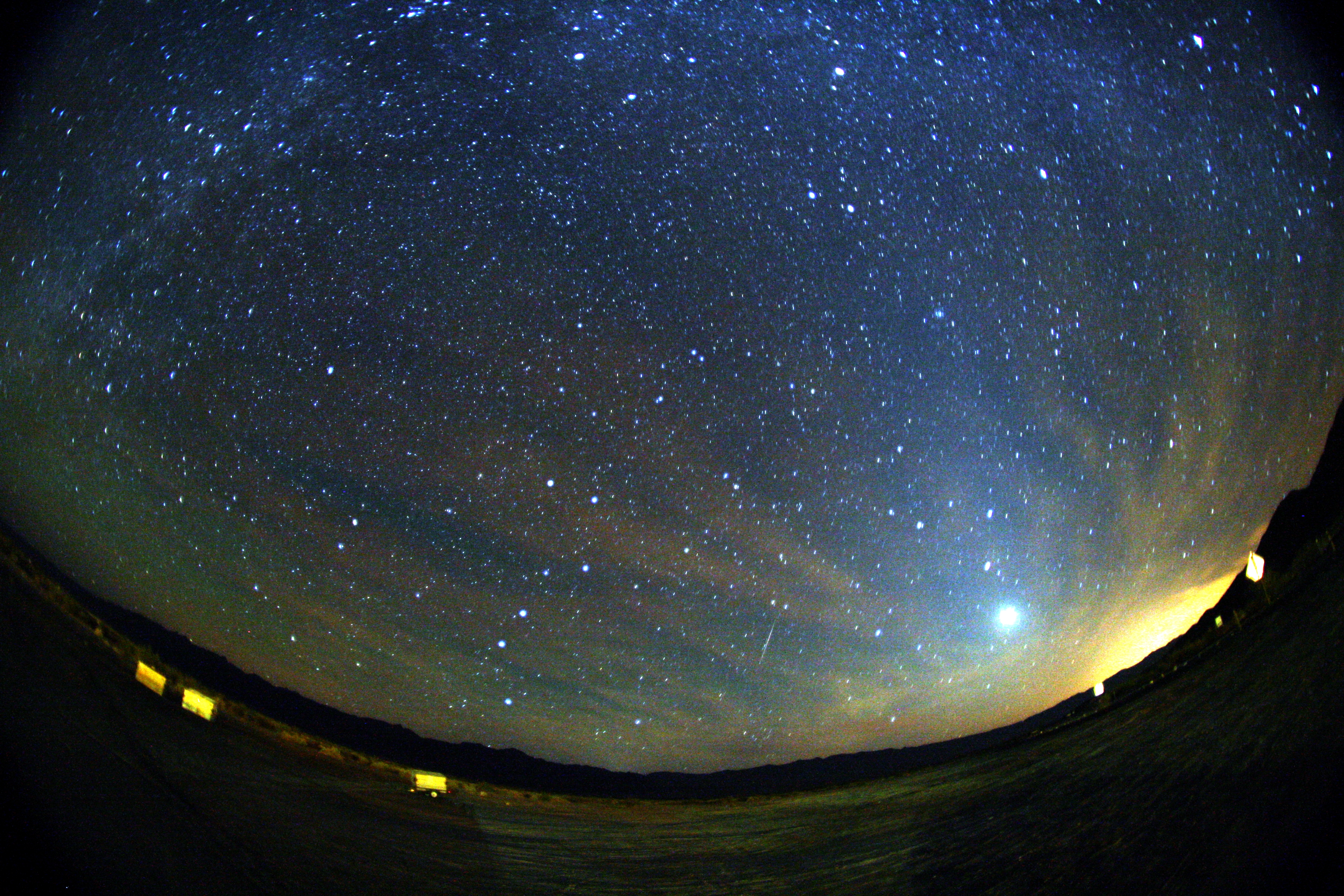
A fish-eye view.

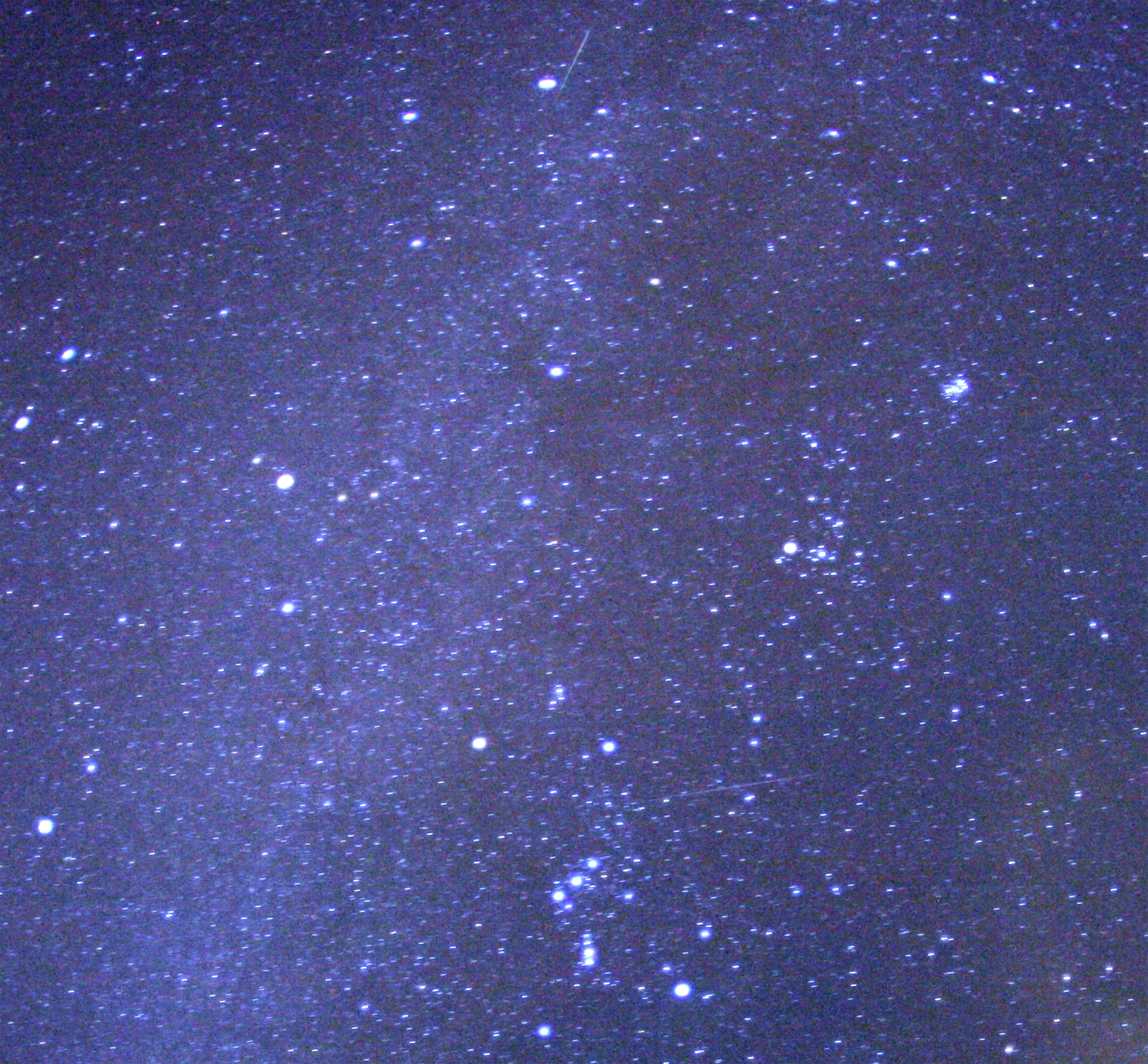
Two Orionids and the Milky Way.

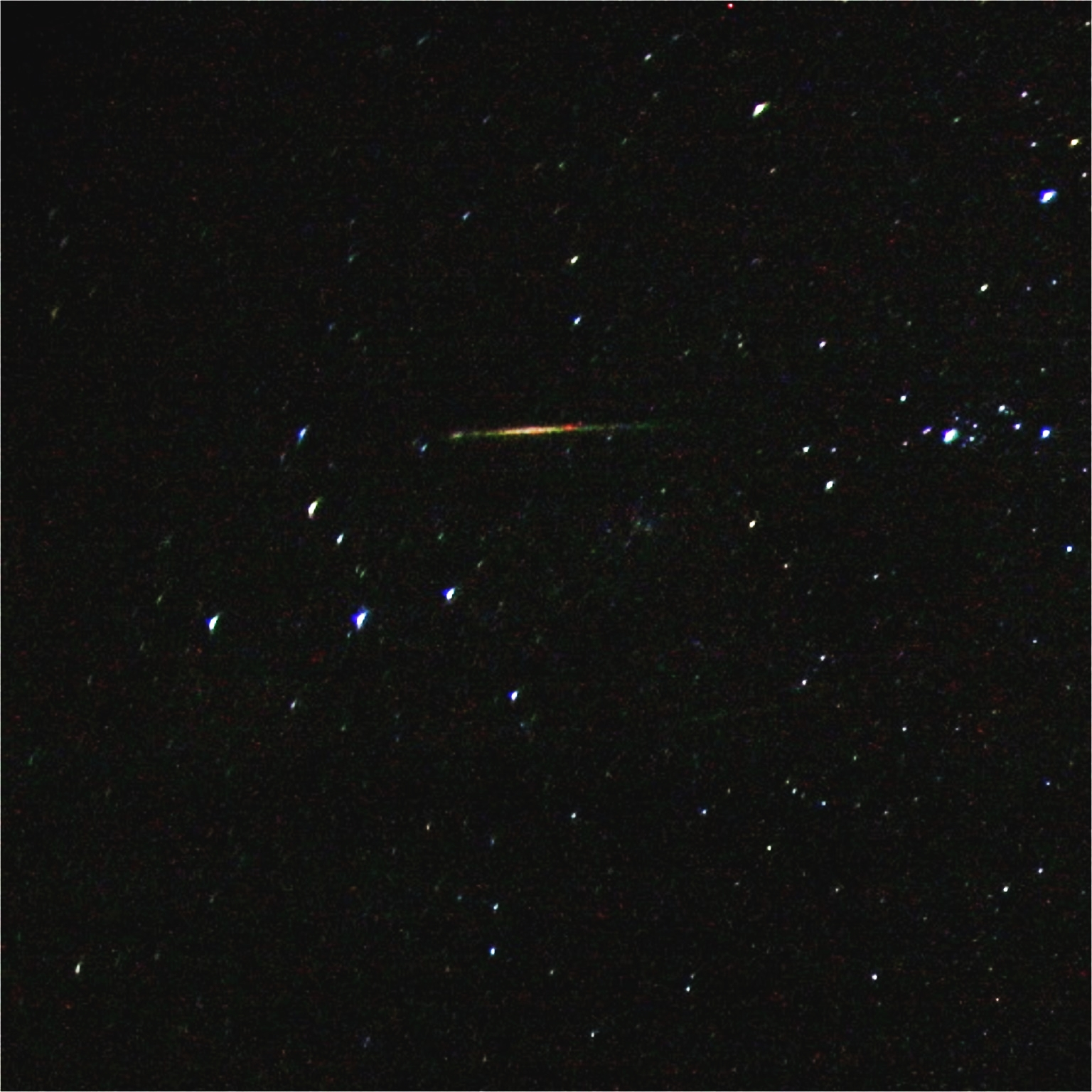
A multicolored Orionid.

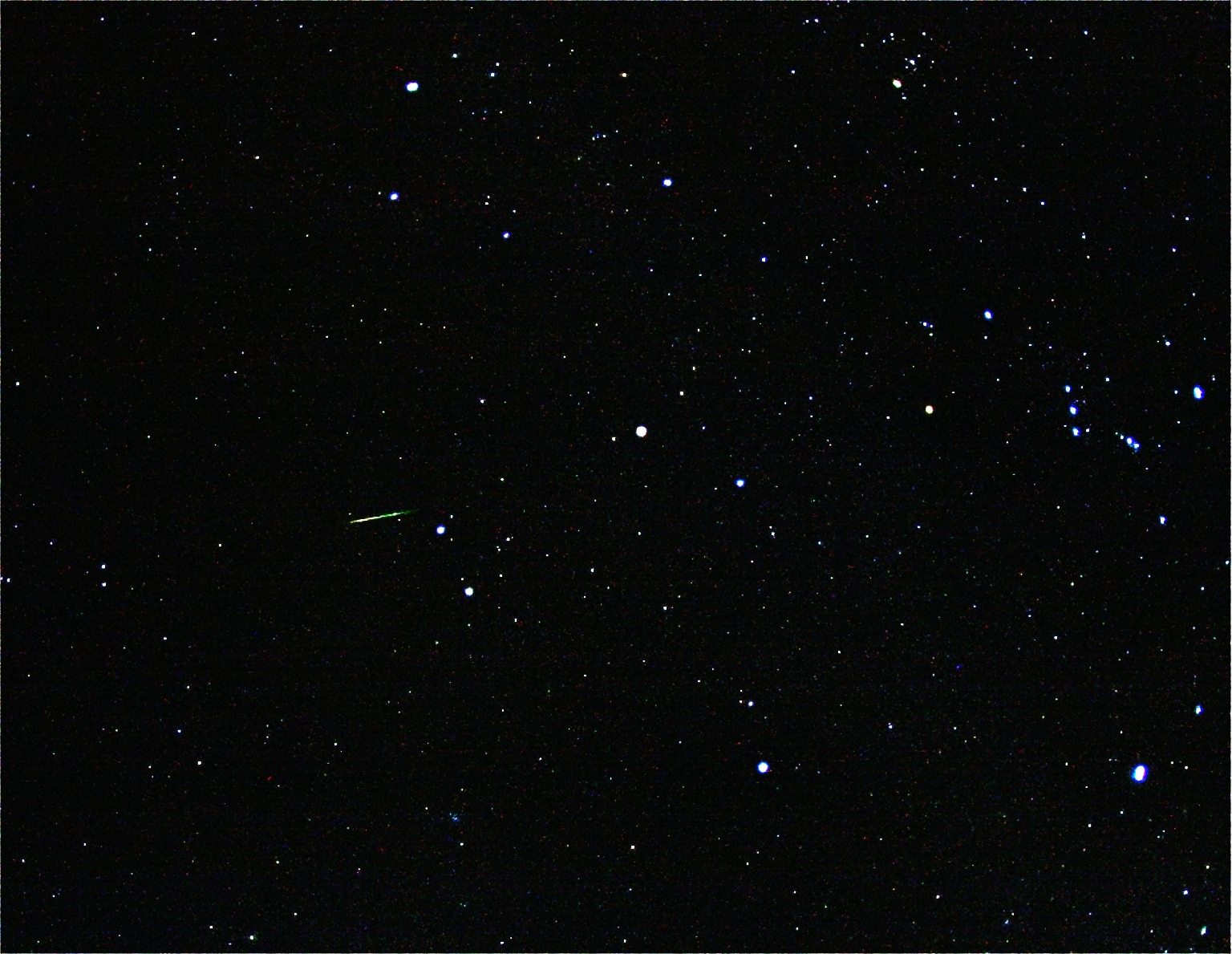
An Orionid to the left.

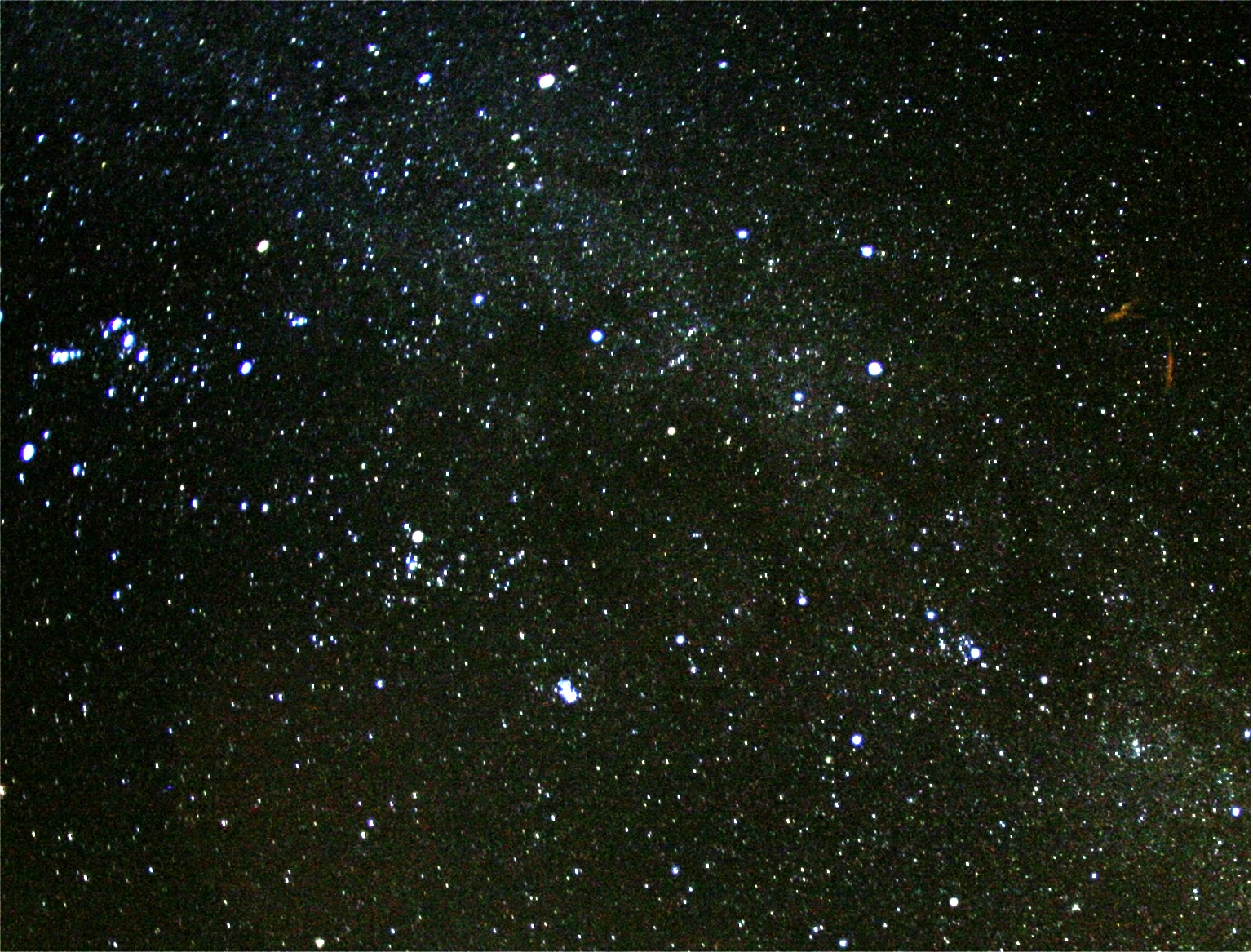
The brightest meteor, a fireball, leaves a persistent smoky trail drifting in high-altitude winds, which is seen on the right side of the image.

== See also ==
- List of meteor showers
