= Alpha Centaurids =

Meteor shower

- Celestial map of Centaurus
- Discovery date: 1969
- Parent body: Unknown

Radiant
- Constellation: Centaurus
- Right ascension: 14^{h} 00^{m} 00^{s}
- Declination: −10° 00′ 00″

Properties
- Occurs during: January 28 to February 21
- Date of peak: February 8
- Velocity: 58 km/s
- Zenithal hourly rate: 6

The Alpha Centaurids are a meteor shower in the constellation Centaurus, peaking in early February each year. The average magnitude is around 2.5, with a peak of about three meteors an hour.

According to Philip M. Bagnall's Atlas of Meteor Showers: "The first probable observation of the α-Centaurids was by V. Williams from Sydney, Australia on 1889 February 10/11."

Bagnall continues: "Nothing more was recorded until 1938, when Cuno Hoffmeister probably picked up activity from his site in South West Africa. However, the shower was only formally recognized during the 1970s, when Michael Buhagiar and members of the Western Australia Meteor Society undertook systematic observations."
