= Leonids =

Meteor shower associated with the comet Tempel–Tuttle

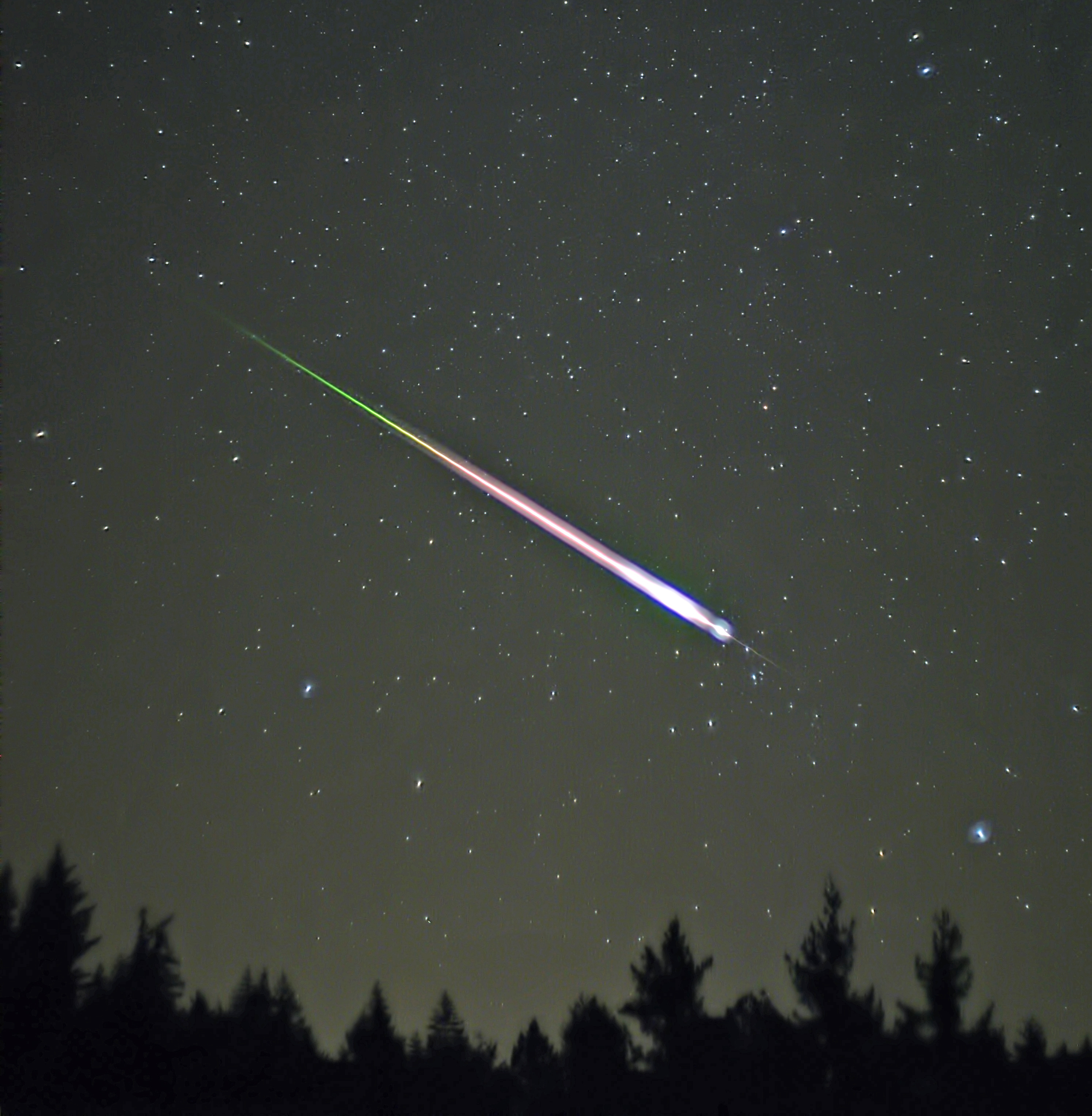
- A Leonid meteor during the peak of the Leonids in 2009
- Pronunciation: /ˈliːənɪdz/
- Discovery date: 902 AD (first record)
- Parent body: 55P/Tempel–Tuttle

Radiant
- Constellation: Leo
- Right ascension: 10^{h} 17^{m}
- Declination: +21.6°

Properties
- Occurs during: 3 November – 2 December
- Date of peak: 17 November
- Velocity: 70–71 km/s
- Zenithal hourly rate: 15

The Leonids (/ˈliːənɪdz/ LEE-ə-nidz) are a prolific annual meteor shower associated with the comet Tempel–Tuttle, and are also known for their spectacular meteor storms that occur about every 33 years. The Leonids get their name from the location of their radiant in the constellation Leo: the meteors appear to radiate from that point in the sky. The name is derived from Greek and Latin with the prefix Leo- referring to the constellation and the suffix -ids signifying that the meteor shower is the offspring of, descendant of, the constellation Leo.

Earth moves through meteoroid streams left from passages of a comet. The streams consist of solid particles, known as meteoroids, normally ejected by the comet as its frozen gases evaporate under the heat of the Sun once within Jupiter's orbit. Due to the retrograde orbit of 55P/Tempel-Tuttle, the Leonids are fast-moving streams which encounter the path of Earth and impact at 70 km/s (252,000 km/h; 156,590 mph). It is the fastest annual meteor shower. Larger Leonids which are about 1 cm (3/8 in) across have a mass of 0.5 g (0.02 oz) and are known for generating bright (apparent magnitude −1.5) meteors. An annual Leonid shower may deposit 12–13 t (13–14 short tons; 26,000–29,000 lb) of particles across the entire planet.

The meteoroids left by the comet are organized in trails in orbits similar to–though different from–that of the comet. They are differentially disturbed by the planets, in particular Jupiter, and to a lesser extent by radiation pressure from the Sun – the Poynting–Robertson effect and the Yarkovsky effect. These trails of meteoroids cause meteor showers when Earth encounters them. Old trails are spatially not dense and compose the meteor shower with a few meteors per minute. In the case of the Leonids, that tends to peak around 18 November, but some are spread over several days on either side and the specific peak changes every year. Conversely, young trails are spatially very dense and the cause of meteor outbursts when the Earth enters one.

The Leonids also produce meteor storms (very large outbursts) about every 33 years, during which activity exceeds 1,000 meteors per hour, with some events exceeding 100,000 meteors per hour, in contrast to the sporadic background (5 to 8 meteors per hour) and the shower background (several meteors per hour).

Meteoroids
Size	Apparent Magnitude	Comparable in brightness
2 mm (1/16 in; 0.2 cm)	+3.7 (visual)	Delta Ursae Majoris
1 cm (3/8 in)	−1.5 (bright)	Sirius
2 cm (3/4 in)	−3.8 (Fireball)	Venus

== History ==
=== 1800s ===
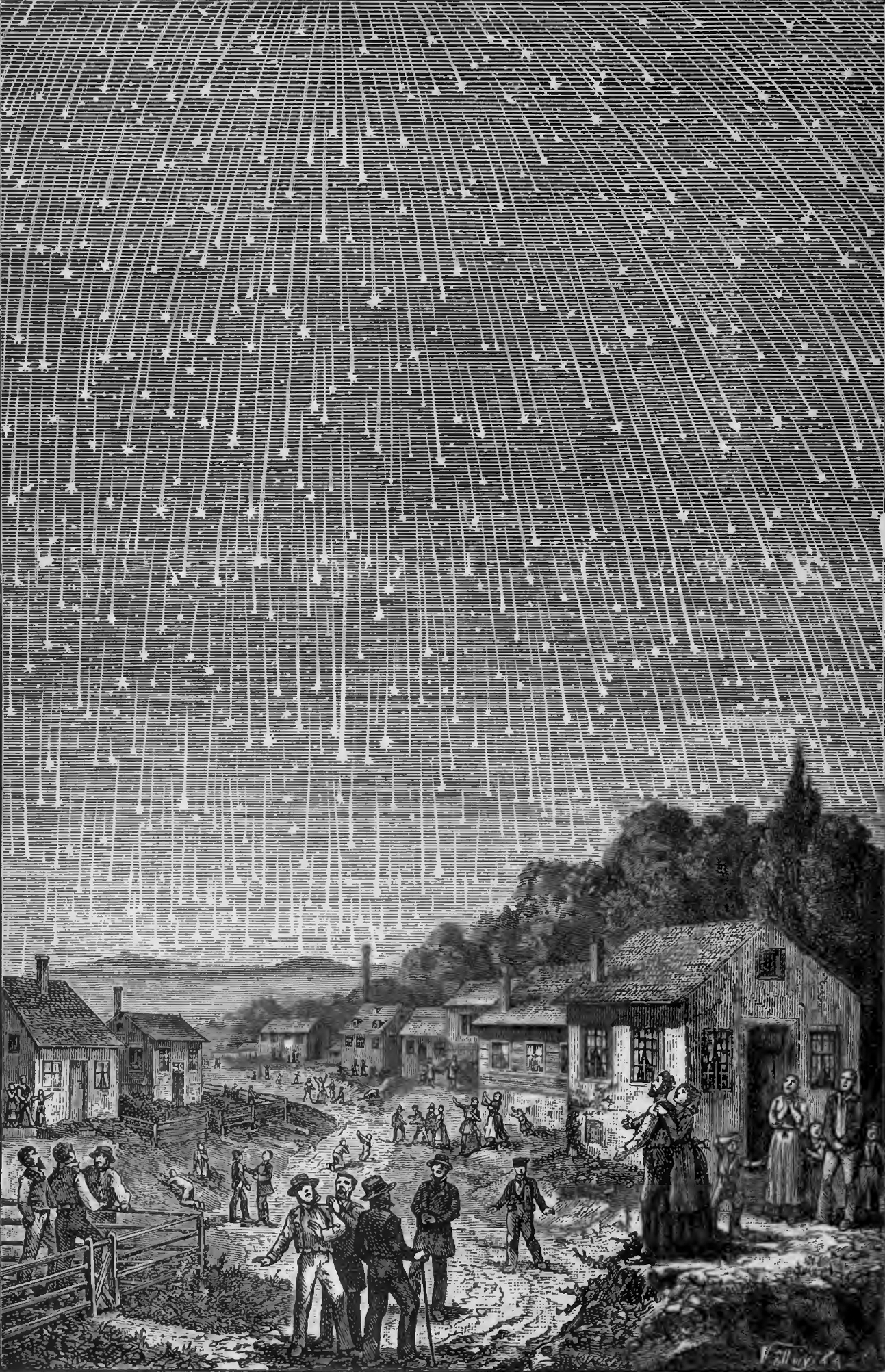
A famous depiction of the 1833 meteor storm, produced in 1889 for the Seventh-day Adventist book Bible Readings for the Home Circle.

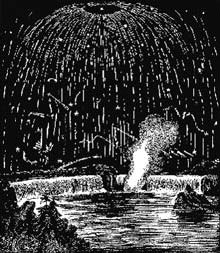
Woodcut print depicts the shower as seen at Niagara Falls, New York. Mechanics' Magazine said this illustration was made by an editor named Pickering "who witnessed the scene."

The Leonids are famous because their meteor showers, or storms, can be among the most spectacular. Because of the storm of 1833 and the developments in scientific thought of the time (see for example the identification of Halley's Comet), the Leonids have had a major effect on the scientific study of meteors, which had previously been thought to be atmospheric phenomena. Although it has been suggested the Leonid meteor shower and storms have been noted in ancient times, it was the meteor storm of 12–13 November 1833 that broke into people's modern-day awareness. One estimate of the peak rate is over one hundred thousand meteors an hour, while another, done as the storm abated, estimated in excess of 240,000 meteors during the nine hours of the storm, over the entire region of North America east of the Rocky Mountains.

The event was marked by several nations of Native Americans: the Cheyenne established a peace treaty and the Lakota calendar was reset. Many Native American birthdays were calculated by reference to the 1833 Leonid event. Abolitionists including Harriet Tubman and Frederick Douglass as well as slave-owners took note and others. The New York Evening Post carried a series of articles on the event including reports from Canada to Jamaica, it made news in several states beyond New York and, though it appeared in North America, was talked about in Europe. The journalism of the event tended to rise above the partisan debates of the time and reviewed facts as they could be sought out. Abraham Lincoln commented on it years later. Near Independence, Missouri, in Clay County, a refugee Mormon community watched the meteor shower on the banks of the Missouri River after having been driven from their homes by local settlers. Joseph Smith, the founder and first leader of Mormonism, afterwards noted in his journal for November 1833 his belief that this event was "a litteral [sic] fulfillment of the word of God" and a harbinger of the imminent second coming of Christ. Though it was noted in the midwest and eastern areas, it was also noted in Far West, Missouri.

Denison Olmsted explained the event most accurately. After spending the last weeks of 1833 collecting information, he presented his findings in January 1834 to the American Journal of Science and Arts, published in January–April 1834, and January 1836. He noted the shower was of short duration and was not seen in Europe, and that the meteors radiated from a point in the constellation of Leo and he speculated the meteors had originated from a cloud of particles in space. Accounts of the 1866 repeat of the Leonids counted hundreds per minute/a few thousand per hour in Europe. The Leonids were again seen in 1867, when moonlight reduced the rates to 1,000 meteors per hour. Another strong appearance of the Leonids in 1868 reached an intensity of 1,000 meteors per hour in dark skies. It was in 1866–67 that information on Comet Tempel-Tuttle was gathered, pointing it out as the source of the meteor shower and meteor storms. When the storms failed to return in 1899, it was generally thought that the dust had moved on and the storms were a thing of the past.

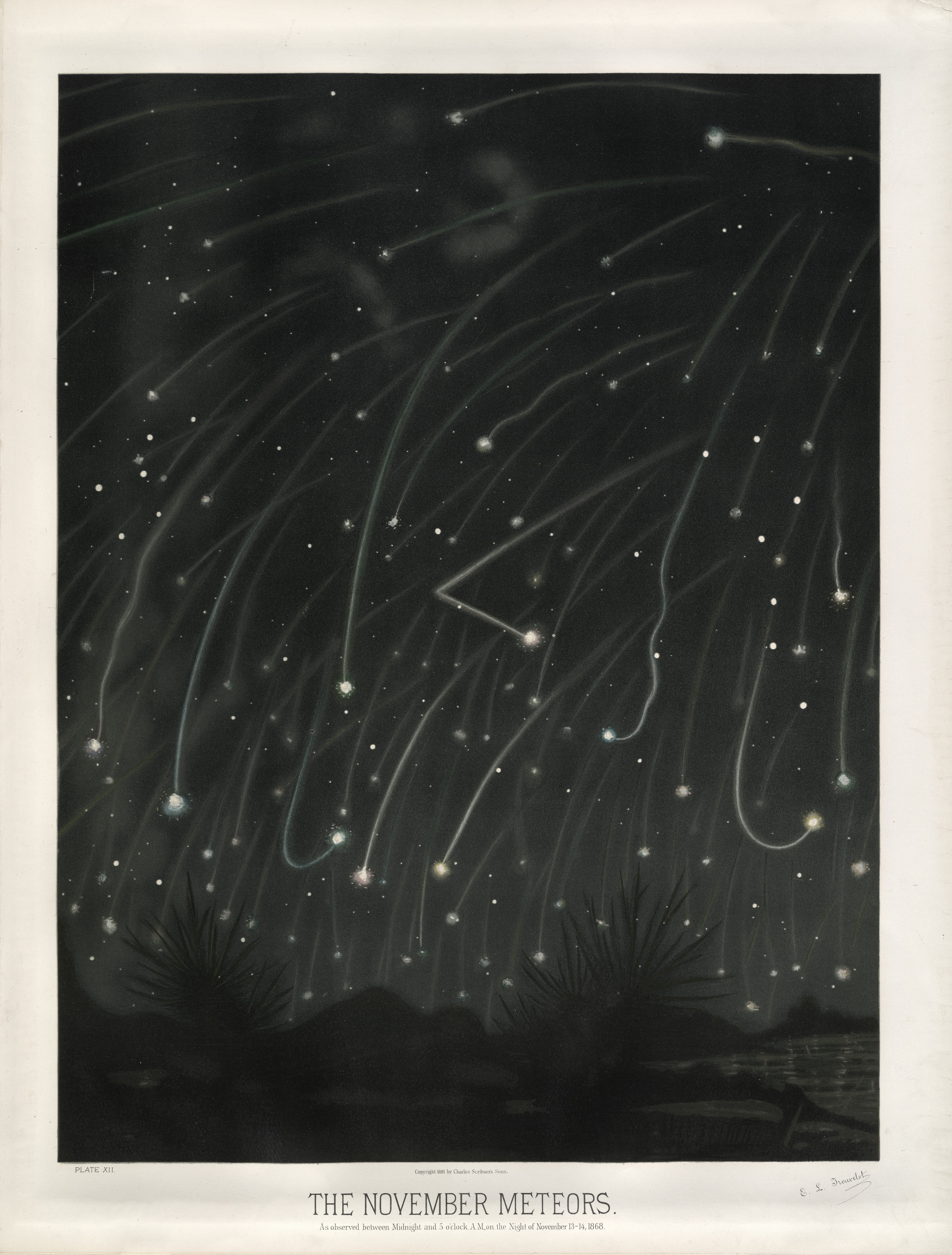
The November Meteors by Étienne Léopold Trouvelot, 1868

=== 1900s ===
In 1966, a spectacular meteor storm was seen over the Americas. Historical notes were gathered thus noting the Leonids back to 900 AD. The 1966 Leonid meteor storm had peak rates exceeding 40 meteors per second, or 144,000 meteors per hour. Radar studies showed the 1966 storm included a relatively high percentage of smaller particles while 1965's lower activity had a much higher proportion of larger particles. In 1981 Donald K. Yeomans of the Jet Propulsion Laboratory reviewed the history of meteor showers for the Leonids and the history of the dynamic orbit of Comet Tempel-Tuttle. A graph from it was adapted and re-published in Sky and Telescope. It showed relative positions of the Earth and Tempel-Tuttle and marks where Earth encountered dense dust. This showed that the meteoroids are mostly behind and outside the path of the comet, but paths of the Earth through the cloud of particles resulting in powerful storms were very near paths of nearly no activity. But overall the 1998 Leonids were in a favorable position so interest was rising.

Leading up to the 1998 return, an airborne observing campaign was organized to mobilize modern observing techniques by Peter Jenniskens at NASA Ames Research Center. In 1999, there were also efforts to observe impacts of meteoroids on the Moon, as an example of transient lunar phenomenon. A particular reason to observe the Moon is that our vantage from a location on Earth sees only meteors coming into the atmosphere relatively close to us, while impacts on the Moon would be visible from across the Moon in a single view. The sodium tail of the Moon tripled just after the 1998 Leonid shower which was composed of larger meteoroids (which in the case of the Earth was witnessed as fireballs). However, in 1999 the sodium tail of the Moon did not change from the Leonid impacts.

Research by Kondrat'eva, Reznikov and colleagues at Kazan University had shown how meteor storms could be accurately predicted, but for some years the worldwide meteor community remained largely unaware of these results. The work of David J. Asher, Armagh Observatory and Robert H. McNaught, Siding Spring Observatory and independently by Esko Lyytinen in 1999, following on from the Kazan research, is considered by most meteor experts as the breakthrough in modern analysis of meteor storms. Whereas previously it was hazardous to guess if there would be a storm or little activity, the predictions of Asher and McNaught timed bursts in activity down to ten minutes by narrowing down the clouds of particles to individual streams from each passage of the comet, and their trajectories amended by subsequent passage near planets. However, whether a specific meteoroid trail will be primarily composed of small or large particles, and thus the relative brightness of the meteors, was not understood. But McNaught did extend the work to examine the placement of the Moon with trails and saw a large chance of a storm impacting in 1999 from a trail while there were less direct impacts from trails in 2000 and 2001 (successive contact with trails through 2006 showed no hits).

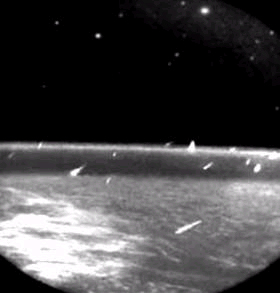
Leonids photographed in Earth orbit by the Midcourse Space Experiment NASA satellite in 1997

=== 2000s ===
Viewing campaigns resulted in spectacular footage from the 1999, 2001, and 2002 storms which produced up to 3,000 Leonid meteors per hour. Predictions for the Moon's Leonid impacts also noted that in 2000 the side of the Moon facing the stream was away from the Earth, but that impacts should be in number enough to raise a cloud of particles kicked off the Moon which could cause a detectable increase in the sodium tail of the Moon. Research using the explanation of meteor trails/streams have explained the storms of the past. The 1833 storm was not due to the recent passage of the comet, but from a direct impact with the previous 1800 dust trail. The meteoroids from the 1733 passage of Comet Tempel-Tuttle resulted in the 1866 storm and the 1966 storm was from the 1899 passage of the comet. The double spikes in Leonid activity in 2001 and in 2002 were due to the passage of the comet's dust ejected in 1767 and 1866. This ground breaking work was soon applied to other meteor showers – for example the 2004 June Bootids. Peter Jenniskens has published predictions for the next 50 years. However, a close encounter with Jupiter is expected to perturb the comet's path, and many streams, making storms of historic magnitude unlikely for many decades. Recent work tries to take into account the roles of differences in parent bodies and the specifics of their orbits, ejection velocities off the solid mass of the core of a comet, radiation pressure from the Sun, the Poynting–Robertson effect, and the Yarkovsky effect on the particles of different sizes and rates of rotation to explain differences between meteor showers in terms of being predominantly fireballs or small meteors.

Year	Leonids active between	Peak of shower	ZHR_{max}
2006		19 Nov. Outburst of ZHR=35–40 was predicted from the 1932 trail.	78
2007		19 Nov. Outburst of ZHR=~30 from the 1932 trail was predicted for 18 Nov.	35
2008	14–22 November	17 Nov. Considerable outburst of ZHR=130 from the 1466 trail was predicted for 17 Nov.	99
2009	10–21 November	ZHR_{max} ranging from 100 to over 500 on 17 Nov. The peak was observed at predicted time.	79
2010	10–23 November	18 Nov	32±4
2011	6–30 November	18 Nov	22±3
2012	6–30 November	20 Nov. Nov 17 ZHR=5–10 (predicted) / 20 Nov ZHR=10–15 (predicted from 1400 trail)	47±11
2013	15–20 November	17 Nov but was washed out by a Full moon on 17 Nov	–
2014	6–30 November	18 Nov	15±4
2015	6–30 November	18 Nov	15
2016	6–30 November	17 Nov	10–15
2017	6–30 November	17 Nov	~17
2018	6–30 November	17 Nov	15–20
2019	6–30 November	17 Nov	10–15
2020	6–30 November	17 Nov	10–15
2021	6–30 November	17 Nov	10–15
2022	17–21 November	17 Nov (there was a low possibility of an outburst from the 1733 meteoroid stream on 19 November)	15 (predicted) - 300 (unlikely)
2023	3 Nov – 2 Dec	17 Nov (a modest increase is possible from the 1767 meteoroid stream on 21 November)	15 (predicted)
2024		17 Nov	15–20 (predicted)
2025		17 Nov (any outburst is likely to be from the 1966 meteoroid stream)	10–15 (predicted)
2026		17 Nov	15 (predicted)
2027		17 Nov (possible activity from 1167 meteoroid stream on 20 November)	40–50 (predicted)
2028		17 Nov	30–40 (predicted)
2029		17 Nov (possible activity from 1998 meteoroid stream)	30–40 (predicted)
2030		17 Nov	15–20 (predicted)
2031		17 Nov	<10 (predicted)
2032		17 Nov	<10 (predicted)
2033		17 Nov (Outburst likely from 1899 meteoroid stream. Encountering a younger stream typically generates more activity.)	35–400 (predicted)
2034		17–18 Nov (probable outburst from the young 1932 meteoroid stream on 18 November)	40–500 (predicted)
2061		(Possible outburst from the young 1998 meteoroid stream on 19 November)	50 (predicted) – 5100 (unlikely)
2099		(Possible outburst from dense stream)	1000+?

Predictions until the end of the 21st century have been published by Mikhail Maslov.

== In popular culture ==
In the mobile rhythm game Hatsune Miku: Colorful Stage!, the band Leo/need derives its name from the meteor shower. The unit's backstory establishes that the members watched the Leonids together as children and named their band after the meteor shower.

The main character of the novel Blood Meridian, The Kid, was born under the Leonid meteor shower in 1833.

== See also ==
- List of meteor showers
- Draconids
- "Stars Fell on Alabama", a Jazz song based on the 1833 Leonid shower
- Perseids, associated with the comet Swift–Tuttle
