= Ursids =

Meteor shower

Ursids (URS)
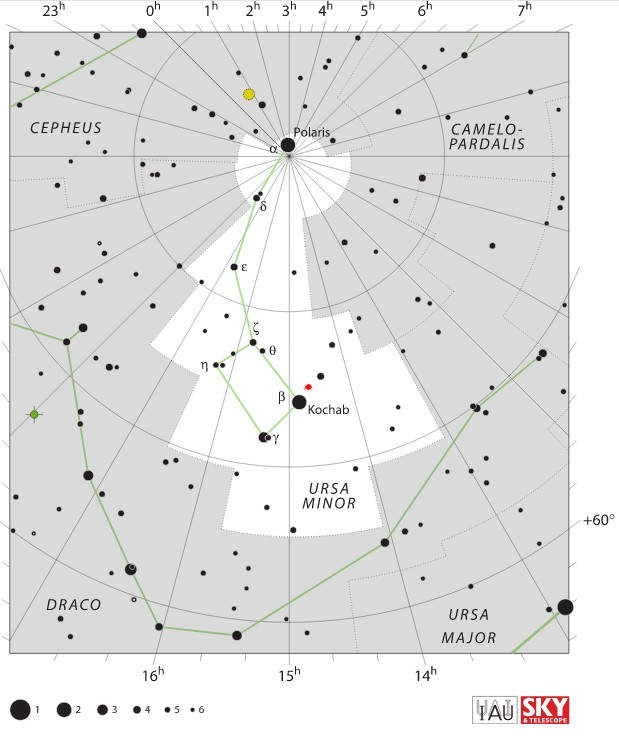
- Ursa Minor with the radiant of the Ursids marked in red
- Parent body: 8P/Tuttle

Radiant
- Constellation: Ursa Minor (near Kochab)
- Right ascension: 14^{h} 36^{m}
- Declination: +75.3° (Northern Hemisphere)

Properties
- Occurs during: December 17 – December 26
- Date of peak: December 22
- Velocity: 33 km/s
- Zenithal hourly rate: 10

The Ursid (URS) meteor activity begins annually around December 17 and runs for over a week, until the 25th or 26th. This meteor shower is named for its radiant point, which is located near the star Beta Ursae Minoris (Kochab) in the constellation Ursa Minor.

== History ==
The Ursids were probably discovered by William F. Denning, who observed them for several years around the start of the 20th century. While there were sporadic observations after, the first coordinated studies of the shower didn't begin until Dr. A. Bečvář observed an outburst of 169 per hour in 1945. Further observations in the 1970s and ongoing to current have established a relationship with comet 8P/Tuttle. Peter Jenniskens and Esko Lyytinen discovered that outbursts could happen when comet Tuttle was at aphelion because some meteoroids get trapped in the 7/6 orbital resonance with Jupiter.

== Technical information ==
Earlier observations described an average radiant of RA=217°, DEC=76°, with maximum occurring at a solar longitude of 270.66 deg (about December 22), with the duration being established as December 17–24.

The Ursids have a particularly narrow stream, prompting veteran meteor observer, Norman W. McLeod, III (Florida) to comment that the Ursids "must be a compact stream like the Quadrantids. You have to be within 12 hours of maximum to see much."
