= Southern Delta Aquariids =

Annual meteor shower

Southern Delta Aquariids (SDA)
- Parent body: 96P/Machholz

Radiant
- Constellation: Aquarius
- Right ascension: 23^{h} 20^{m}
- Declination: −16°

Properties
- Occurs during: July 12 – August 23
- Date of peak: July 30
- Zenithal hourly rate: 16

The Southern Delta Aquariids are a meteor shower visible from mid July to mid August each year with peak activity on 28 or 29 July. The comet of origin is not known with certainty. A suspected candidate is Comet 96P Machholz. Earlier, it was thought to have originated from the Marsden and Kracht Sungrazing comets.

The Delta Aquariids get their name because their radiant appears to lie in the constellation Aquarius, near one of the constellation's brightest stars, Delta Aquarii. The name derives from the Latin possessive form "Aquarii", whereby the declension "-i" is replaced by "-ids" (hence Aquariids with two i's). There are two branches of the Delta Aquariid meteor shower, Southern and Northern. The Southern Delta Aquariids are considered a strong shower, with an average meteor observation rate of 15–20 per hour, and a peak zenithal hourly rate of 18. The average radiant is at RA=339°, DEC=−17°. The Northern Delta Aquariids are a weaker shower, peaking later in mid August, with an average peak rate of 10 meteors per hour and an average radiant of RA=340°, DEC=−2°.

== History ==
Observations of the (then unidentified) Delta Aquariids (δ Aquariids) were recorded by G. L. Tupman in 1870, who plotted 65 meteors observed between July 27 and August 6. He plotted the radiant's apparent beginning and ending points (RA=340°, DEC=−14°; RA=333°, DEC=−16°). This was corrected later. Ronald A. McIntosh re-plotted the path, based on a greater number of observations made from 1926 to 1933. He determined it to begin at RA=334.9°, DEC=−19.2° and end RA=352.4°, DEC=−11.8°. Cuno Hoffmeister and a team of German observers were the first to record the characteristics of a Northern Aquariid radiant within the stream around 1938. Canadian D. W. R. McKinley observed both branches in 1949, but did not associate the two radiants. That was accomplished by astronomer Mary Almond, in 1952, who determined both the accurate velocity and orbit of the δ Aquariids. She used a "more selective beamed aerial" (echo radio) to identify probable member meteors and plotted an accurate orbital plane. Her paper reported it as a broad "system of orbits" that are probably "connected and produced by one extended stream." This was confirmed in the 1952–1954 Harvard Meteor Project, via photographic observation of orbits. The Project also produced the first evidence that the stream's evolution was influenced by Jupiter.

== Viewing ==
The Delta Aquariids are best viewed in the pre-dawn hours, away from the glow of city lights. Southern Hemisphere viewers usually get a better show because the radiant is higher in the sky during the peak season. Since the radiant is above the southern horizon for Northern Hemisphere viewers, meteors will primarily fan out in all compass points, east, north and west. Few meteors will be seen heading southward, unless they are fairly short and near the radiant.

== See also ==
- List of Aquariid meteor showers
