= Phoenicids =

Meteor shower

- Celestial map of Phoenix
- Discovery date: 1956
- Parent body: 289P/Blanpain

Radiant
- Constellation: Phoenix
- Right ascension: 1^{h} 12^{m} -0^{s}
- Declination: −44° 00′ 00″

Properties
- Occurs during: 4–6 December
- Date of peak: 5 December
- Velocity: 11.7 km/s
- Zenithal hourly rate: Variable

The Phoenicids are a minor meteor shower, first noticed by observers in New Zealand, Australia, the Indian Ocean, and South Africa during an outburst of approximately 100 meteors an hour that occurred during December 1956. Like other meteor showers, the Phoenicids get their name from the location of their radiant, which is in the constellation Phoenix. They are active from 29 November to 9 December, with a peak occurring around 5/6 December each year, and are best seen from the Southern Hemisphere.

The Phoenicids appear to be associated with a stream of material from the disintegrating comet 289P/Blanpain (D/1819 W1) with a 5-year orbital period. It next comes to perihelion in 2025.

Using the formula $V_\infty = \sqrt{V_g^2+(11.2\ \mathrm{km/s})^2}$, the Phoenicids (#254) have an atmospheric entry velocity of about 14.3 km/s and a geocentric velocity (before the influence of Earth's gravity) of 8.9 km/s.

A very minor meteor shower with a radiant in Phoenix also occurs in July—this shower is referred to as the July Phoenicids.
