= Pi Puppids =

Meteor shower associated with the comet 26P/Grigg-Skjellerup

pi Puppids
- Celestial map of Puppis
- Discovery date: 1972
- Parent body: 26P/Grigg-Skjellerup

Radiant
- Constellation: Puppis
- Right ascension: 7^{h} 19^{m} 60^{s}
- Declination: −45° 00′ 00″

Properties
- Occurs during: April 16 to April 30
- Date of peak: April 24
- Velocity: 15 km/s
- Zenithal hourly rate: Variable

The pi Puppids are a meteor shower associated with the comet 26P/Grigg-Skjellerup. The meteoroid streams approach the Sun at around 37 km/s and have to overtake Earth that is orbiting the Sun at 30 km/s, resulting in atmospheric entry at a relatively slow 15 km/s.

The meteor stream is viewable around April 24 but only in years around the parent comet's perihelion date, the next being in 2028-2029. However, in 1999 the planet Jupiter perturbed the comet's perihelion to beyond Earth's orbit, and it is uncertain how strong the shower will be in the future.

The pi Puppids get their name because their radiant appears to lie in the constellation Puppis, at around right ascension 112 degrees and declination −45 degrees. This made them only visible to southern observers.

They were discovered in 1972 and have been observed about every 5 years - at each perihelion passage of the comet - but often at very low rates per hour.

== 2019 ==
With a large error bar, the Pi Puppids may have briefly reached a zenithal hourly rate of around 380 on 17 April 2019. Comet 26P/Grigg-Skjellerup had come to perihelion in October 2018.
