= Glowworm (disambiguation) =

A glowworm is a glowing larva of some beetles and gnats.

Glowworm or similar may also refer to:

== Fictional characters ==
- Glowworm (comics), two unrelated Marvel Comics characters
- The Glowworm, a character in the children's book James and the Giant Peach

== Music ==
- Glowworm Records, a subsidiary of Epic Records
- "The Glow-Worm", a song written by Paul Lincke
- Gloworm, a house music group active in the 1990s
- "Glow Worm", a song by Skrillex
- "Glowworm", a song by The Apples in Stereo on their album Fun Trick Noisemaker

== Other uses ==
- Glowworm (astronomy), the luminous trail of a tiny meteor
- HMS Glowworm, three British Navy ships
- Glo Worm, a children's toy
- Glow-worm, a UK boiler manufacturer and one of the eight brands that form the Vaillant Group
