= Eta Aquariids =

Meteor shower

Eta Aquariids (ETA)
- Discovery date: 1878
- Parent body: Halley's Comet

Radiant
- Constellation: Aquarius (near Eta Aquarii)
- Right ascension: 22^{h} 20^{m}
- Declination: −01°

Properties
- Occurs during: April 19 – May 28
- Date of peak: May 6
- Velocity: 66 km/s
- Zenithal hourly rate: 55

Animation of 1P/Halley orbit - 1986 apparition 1P/Halley Earth Sun

The Eta Aquariids are a meteor shower associated with Halley's Comet. The shower is visible from about April 19 to about May 28 each year with peak activity on or around May 5. Unlike most major annual meteor showers, there is no sharp peak for this shower, but rather a broad maximum with good rates that last approximately one week centered on May 5. The meteors we currently see as members of the Eta Aquariid shower separated from Halley's Comet hundreds of years ago. The current orbit of Halley's Comet does not pass close enough to the Earth to be a source of meteoric activity.

Eta Aquariid outbursts occurred in 74 BCE, 401, 443, 466, 530, 839, 905, 927, and 934. The Eta Aquariid meteor shower was the first to be linked to Halley's comet and is usually two to three times stronger than the October Orionids. The Eta Aquariids are the third strongest annual meteor shower observable at Earth and occur at the descending node of Halley's comet. The descending node reached its closest distance to Earth around 500. Currently Earth approaches Halley's orbit at a distance of 0.065 AU (9.7 million km; 6.0 million mi; 25 LD) during the Eta Aquariids.

The Eta Aquariids get their name because their radiant appears to lie in the constellation Aquarius, near one of the constellation's brightest stars, Eta Aquarii. The shower peaks at about a rate of around a meteor per minute, although such rates are rarely seen from northern latitudes due to the low altitude of the radiant. The Eta Aquariids are best viewed in the pre-dawn hours away from the glow of city lights. For northern observers, the radiant of the shower is only above the horizon for the few hours before dawn, and early-rising observers are often rewarded with rates that climb as the radiant rises before sunrise. The shower is best viewed from the equator to 30 degrees south latitude.

The activity is fairly constant from one return to the next. However, in 2013, the maximum Zenithal Hourly Rate (ZHR) exceeded the average level significantly for about two days. An explanation was presented by Mikiya Sato (Sato & Watanabe, 2013), showing that the meteoroids are from a very old ejection from the parent Halley's Comet and are in resonances to Jupiter's orbit (similar to the Orionids observed between 2007 and 2010). The peak ZHR reached 135 ± 16. Updated information on the expected time and rates of the shower is provided through the annual IMO Meteor Shower Calendar.

== See also ==
- List of Aquariid meteor showers
