= Glowworm (astronomy) =

Luminous trail of a tiny meteor

A glowworm is a luminous trail of a tiny meteor, occasionally visible in the night sky during a meteor shower.

The centimeter-sized comet pieces can produce hundreds of fireballs or more each hour. In some cases, particularly during the Leonids, the fireballs make bright trails that can stay up for 10 to 15 minutes, according to astronomers.
