= June Bootids =

Meteor shower

- Celestial map of Boötes
- Parent body: 7P/Pons-Winnecke

Radiant
- Constellation: Boötes
- Right ascension: 14^{h} 55^{m} 60^{s}
- Declination: +48° 00′ 00″

Properties
- Occurs during: June 22 to July 2
- Date of peak: June 27
- Velocity: 18 km/s
- Zenithal hourly rate: Variable
- Notable features: Vg (geocentric velocity) = 14.1±0.4 km/s

The June Bootids or June Boötids (shower #170 JBO) is a meteor shower occurring every year between 22 June and 2 July that peaks around June 27. In most years their activity is weak, with a zenithal hourly rate (ZHR) of only 1 or 2. However, occasional outbursts have been seen, with the outburst of 1916 drawing attention to the previously unrecorded meteor shower. The most recent outburst occurred in 1998, when the ZHR reached 100.

The meteor shower occurs when the Earth crosses the orbit of Comet Pons-Winnecke, a short-period comet which orbits the Sun about every 6.3 years. They are very slow meteors making atmospheric entry at 14 km/s.
