= Solar longitude =

Ecliptic longitude of the Sun

Solar longitude, commonly abbreviated as L_{s} (pronounced ell sub ess), is the longitude of the Sun as seen from a given body, i.e. the position of the Sun on the celestial sphere along the orbital plane of that body. It is also an effective measure of the position of the Earth (or any other Sun-orbiting body) in its orbit around the Sun, usually taken as zero at the moment of the vernal equinox. Since it is based on how far the Earth has moved in its orbit since the equinox, it is a measure of what time of the tropical year (the year of seasons) the planet is in, but without the inaccuracies of a calendar date, which is perturbed by leap years and calendar imperfections. Its independence from a calendar also allows it to be used to tell the time of year on other planets, such as Mars.

Solar longitude does not increase linearly with time, the deviation being larger the greater the eccentricity of the orbit. For instance, here are the dates for multiples of 90° solar longitude on Mars in the mid 1950s:

Solar longitude	Date	Time (Earth days)
0°	11 April 1955	199
90°	27 October 1955	183
180°	27 April 1956	147
270°	21 September 1956	158
0°	26 February 1957	Total: 687

== Of meteor showers ==
Solar longitude is especially used in the field of meteor showers, because a particular meteor shower is caused by a stream of small particles very close to the elliptical orbit of a comet, or former comet. This means that the shower occurs when Earth reaches a particular point in its own orbit, designated by the solar longitude. For example, after passing the March equinox, the solar longitude (λ_{☉}) of the April Lyrids is 32°.

The value of the solar longitude, like any ecliptic longitude, depends on the epoch being used. The solar longitude for a given meteor shower would therefore not be constant if the current date were used as the epoch. For this reason, a standard epoch is used, usually J2000.

== Of Mars ==
The Martian year can be divided into 12 Martian months of unequal duration, with the breakpoints being at solar longitudes that are multiples of 30°.

== See also ==
- Celestial coordinate system
- Ecliptic
- Ecliptic pole, where the ecliptic latitude is ±90°
- Equinox
