= Perseids =

Prolific meteor shower associated with the comet Swift-Tuttle

Perseids (PER)
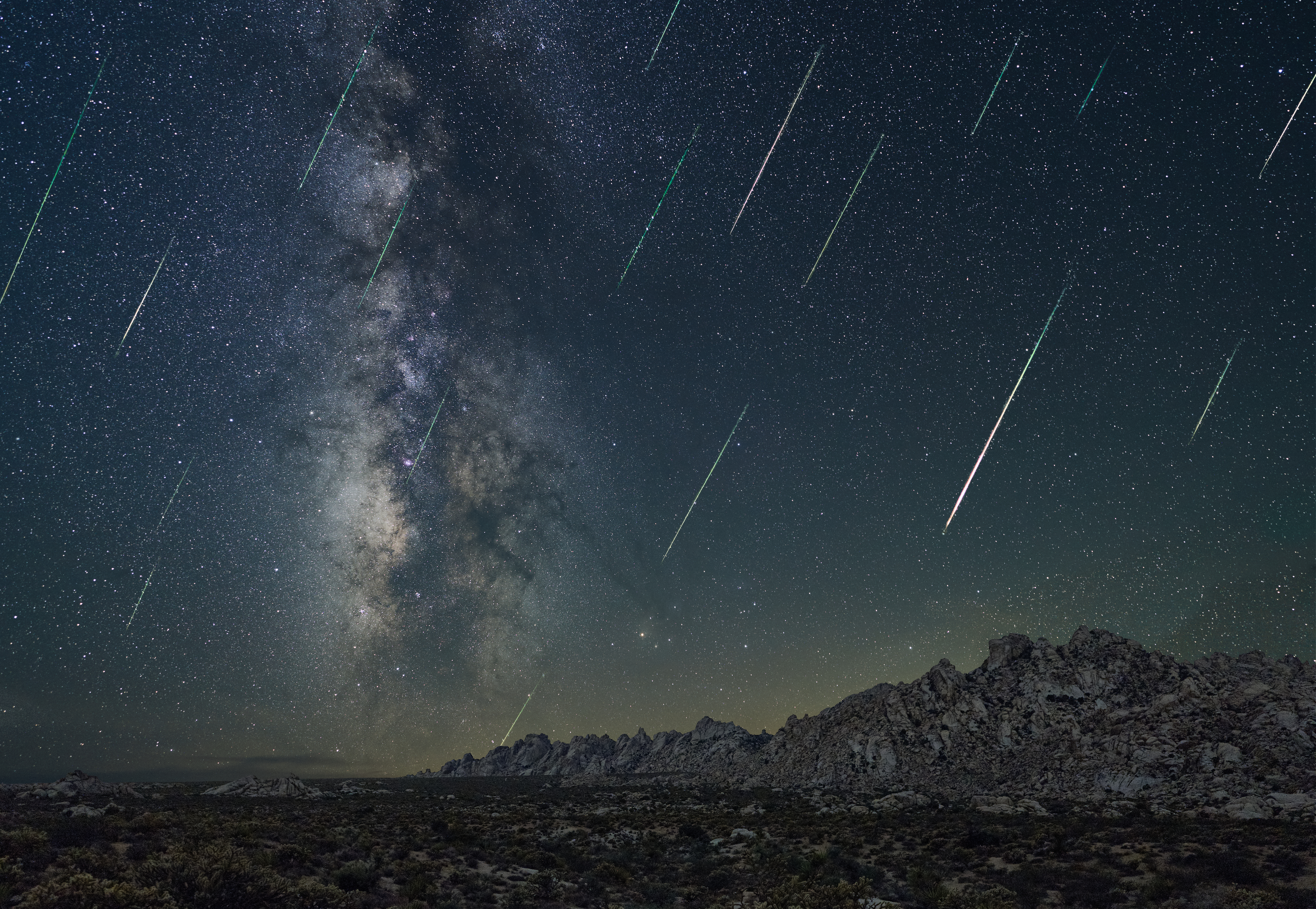
- Perseids in 2021 as seen from the Mojave National Preserve, California
- Pronunciation: /ˈpɜːrsi.ədz/
- Discovery date: AD 36 (first record)
- Parent body: Comet Swift–Tuttle

Radiant
- Constellation: Perseus and Cassiopeia (near HD 19557)
- Right ascension: 03^{h} 13^{m}
- Declination: +58°

Properties
- Occurs during: July 14 – September 1
- Date of peak: August 13
- Velocity: 58.8 km/s
- Zenithal hourly rate: 100

The Perseids are a prolific meteor shower associated with the comet Swift–Tuttle that are usually visible from mid-July to late August. The meteors are called the Perseids because they appear from the general direction of the constellation Perseus and in more modern times have a radiant bordering on Cassiopeia and Camelopardalis.

== Etymology ==
The name is derived from the word Perseids (Greek: Περσείδαι), the sons of Perseus in Greek mythology.

== Characteristics ==
Appearance of the Perseids on 12 August 2027 at 23:30 local summer time

A meteoroid of the Perseids with a size of about 1 cm entering the Earth's atmosphere in slow motion (×0.1). The meteoroid is at the bright head of the trail, and the recombination glow of the ionised mesosphere is still visible for about 0.7 seconds in the tail. (Variant of the animation in real time)

Video of two meteors of the Perseids within five seconds and a Starlink satellite in constellation Cygnus taken in International Dark Sky Reserve Westhavelland on 12 August 2020

The stream of debris is called the Perseid cloud and stretches along the orbit of the comet Swift–Tuttle. The cloud consists of particles ejected by the comet as it travels on its 133-year orbit. Most of the particles have been part of the cloud for around a thousand years. However, there is also a relatively young filament of dust in the stream that was pulled off the comet in 1865, which can give an early mini-peak the day before the maximum shower. The dimensions of the cloud in the vicinity of the Earth are estimated to be approximately 0.1 astronomical units (AU) across and 0.8 AU along the Earth's orbit, spread out by annual interactions with the Earth's gravity.

The shower is visible from mid-July each year, with the peak in activity occurring between 9 and 14 August, depending on the particular location of the stream. During the peak, the rate of meteors reaches 60 or more per hour. They can be seen all across the sky; however, because of the shower's radiant in the constellation of Perseus, the Perseids are primarily visible in the Northern Hemisphere. As with many meteor showers the visible rate is greatest in the pre-dawn hours, since more meteoroids are scooped up by the side of the Earth moving forward into the stream, corresponding to local times between midnight and noon, as can be seen in the accompanying diagram. While many meteors arrive between dawn and noon, they are usually not visible due to daylight. Some can also be seen before midnight, often grazing the Earth's atmosphere to produce long bright trails and sometimes fireballs. Most Perseids burn up in the atmosphere while at heights above 80 kilometres (50 mi).

Largest Perseid meteoroids have masses of 7 kilograms (15 lb).

=== Peak times ===
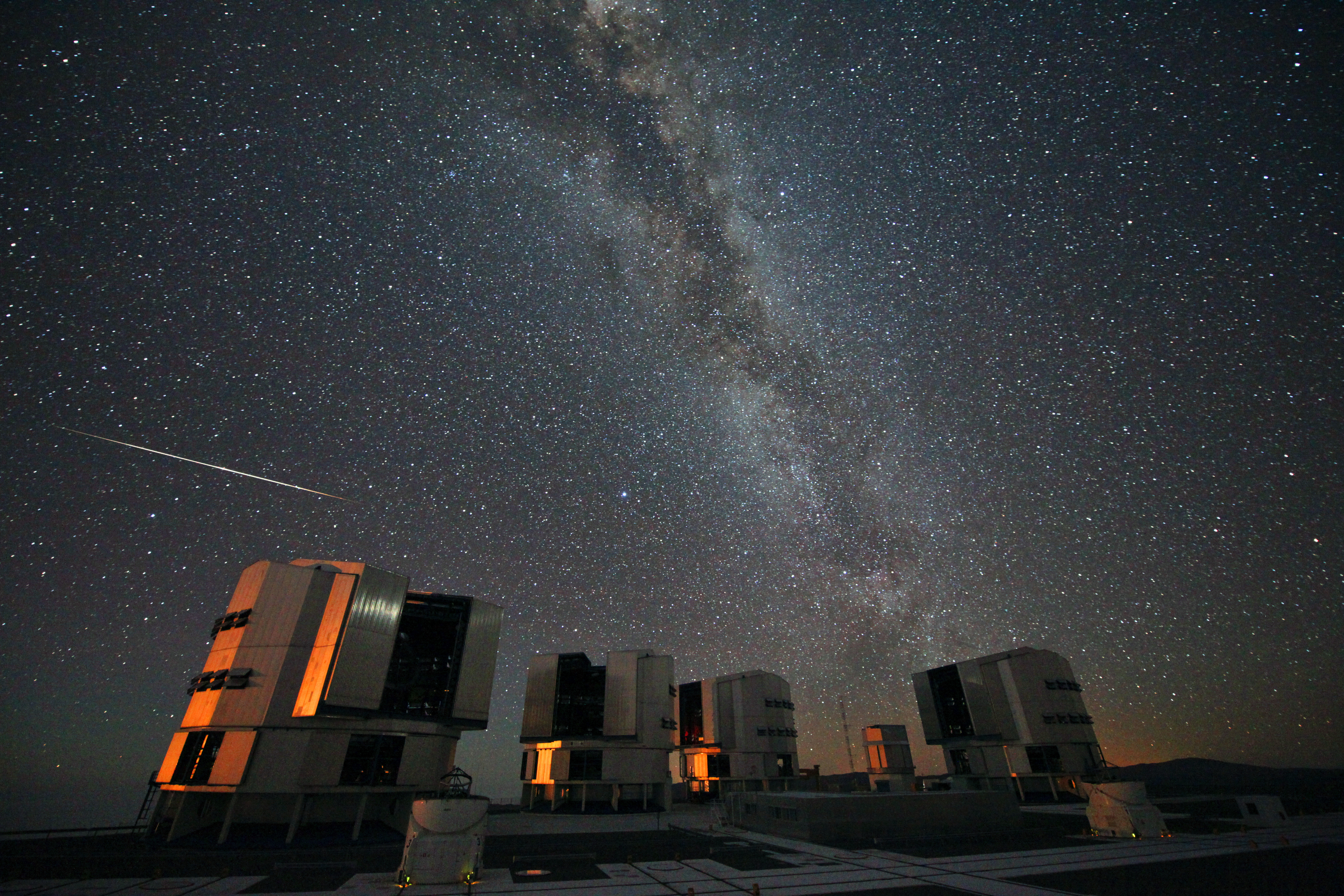
The 2010 Perseids over the ESO's VLT

Year	Perseids active between	Peak of shower
2026	July 17 – August 29	August 12-13 (ZHR_{max} 100)
2025	July 17 – August 24	August 12–13 (ZHR_{max} 100)
2024	July 17 – August 23	The Perseid maximum occurred between the hours 13–16 Universal Time on August 12th
2023	July 14 – Sep 01	August 13 08:00 UT (8% Waning Crescent Moon). Earth may have crossed the 69 BCE trail around August 14 02:00 UT. The New Moon is on Aug 23
2022	July 17 – August 24	August 12–13 (full moon on Aug 12)
2021	July 17 – August 24	August 11–12 (ZHR_{max} 150)
2020	July 16 – August 23	August 12–13 (ZHR_{max} 100) (full moon on Aug 3)
2019	July 17 – August 24	August 12–13 (ZHR_{max} 80) (full moon on Aug 15)
2018	July 17 – August 24	August 11–13 (ZHR_{max} 60)
2017	July 17 – August 24	August 12
2016	July 17 – August 24	August 11–12 (ZHR_{max} 150)
2015	July 17 – August 24	August 12–13 (ZHR_{max} 95) (new moon on Aug 14)
2014	July 17 – August 24	August 13 (ZHR_{max} 68) (full moon on Aug 10)
2013	July 17 – August 24	August 12 (ZHR_{max} 109)
2012	July 17 – August 24	August 12 (ZHR_{max} 122)
2011	July 17 – August 24	August 12 (ZHR_{max} 58) (full moon on Aug 13)
2010	July 23 – August 24	August 12 (ZHR_{max} 142)
2009	July 14 – August 24	August 13 (ZHR_{max} 173) (The estimated peak was 173, but a gibbous Moon washed out fainter meteors.)
2008	July 25 – August 24	August 13 (ZHR_{max} 116)
2007	July 19 – August 25	August 13 (ZHR_{max} 93)
2006		August 12/13 (ZHR_{max} 100)
2005		August 12 (ZHR _{max} 90)
2004		August 12 (ZHR_{max} >200)
1994		(ZHR_{max} >200)
1993		(ZHR_{max} 200–500)
1992		August 11 (outburst under a full moon on Aug 13)
1883	August 9 or earlier	August 11 (ZHR_{max} 43)
1864		(ZHR_{max} >100)
1863		(ZHR_{max} 109–215)
1861		(ZHR_{max} 78–102)
1858		(ZHR_{max} 37–88)
1839		(ZHR_{max} 165)

== Historical observations and associations ==
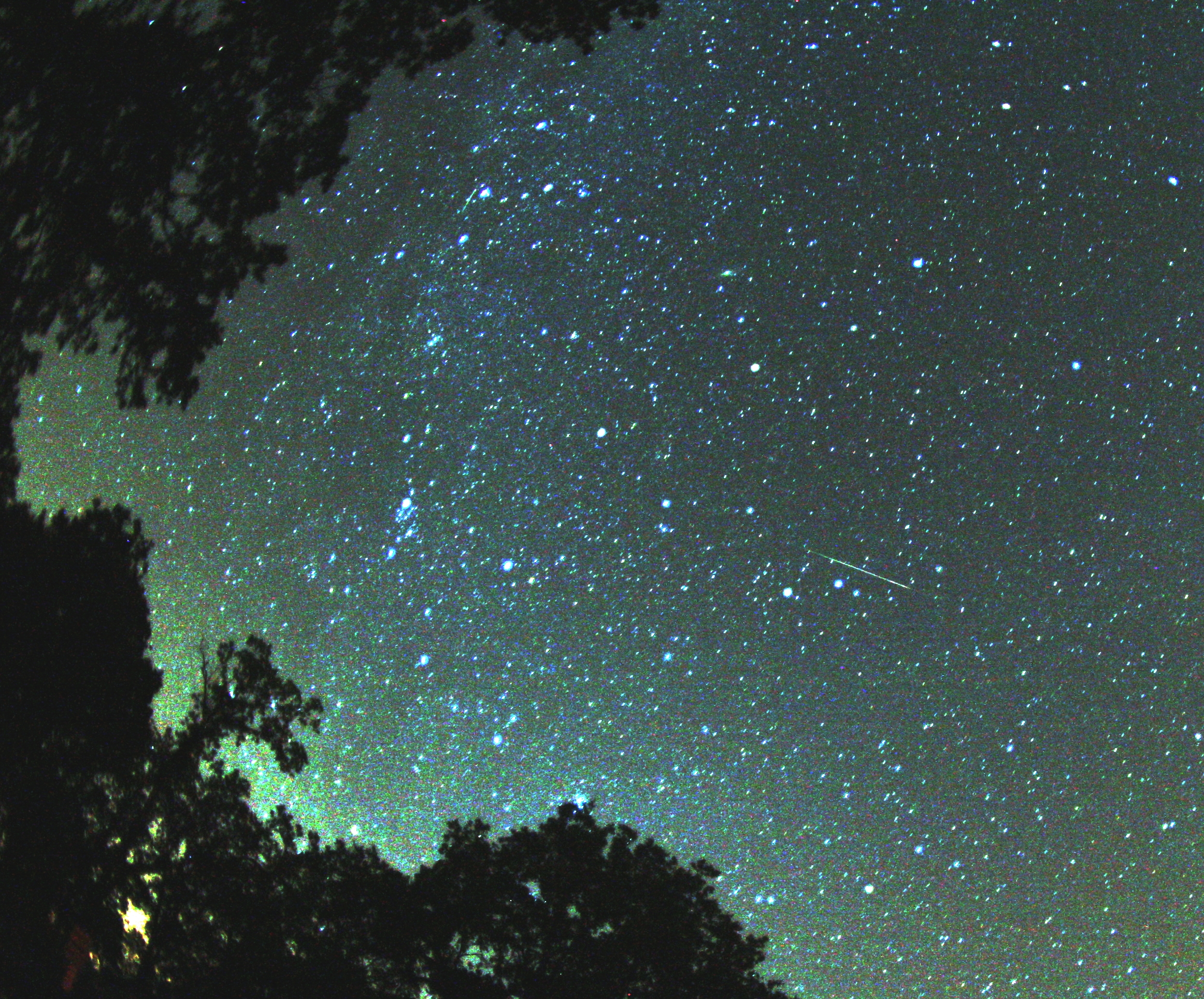
A Perseid in 2007

Some Catholics refer to the Perseids as the "tears of Saint Lawrence", suspended in the sky but returning to Earth once a year on August 10, the canonical date of that saint's martyrdom in 258 AD. The saint is said to have been burned alive on a gridiron. His manner of death is almost certainly the origin of the Mediterranean folk legend claiming that the shooting stars are the sparks of Saint Lawrence's martyrdom. The legend holds that during the night of August 9 to 10, cooled embers appear in the ground under plants; these embers are known as the "coal of Saint Lawrence".

The transition in favor of the Catholic saint and his feast day on August 10, moving away from pagan gods and their festivals – a process known as Christianization – was facilitated by the phonetic assonance of the Latin name Laurentius with Acca Larentia, a goddess previously celebrated during the summer period alongside Priapus, as a fertility deity. Among the Romans, it was believed that the trails of the Perseids represented the benevolent rain of Priapus' seed. In this context, the god's cosmogonic phallus acted as a life-giver, blessing the fields and promoting fertility. During the same period, phallic processions and other sexual rites were common. Christianity, which had a different relationship with sexuality and generativity compared to Greco-Roman culture, replaced this sexual connotation with a reference to martyrdom.

In 1836, Adolphe Quetelet wrote: J'ai cru remarquer aussi une fréquence plus grande de ces météores au mois d'août (du 8 au 15) "I think I noticed also a greater frequency of these meteors in the month of August (from 8 to 15)". After studying historical records, he predicted a peak on 10 August. He then wrote to other astronomers, who confirmed this prediction on the night of 10 August 1837. Quetelet missed the shower due to bad weather.

In 1866, after the perihelion passage of Swift–Tuttle in 1862, the Italian astronomer Giovanni Virginio Schiaparelli discovered the link between meteor showers and comets. The finding is contained in an exchange of letters with Angelo Secchi.

In 1992, Comet Swift–Tuttle returned to the Earth's vicinity, producing strong Perseid meteor outbursts in August 1991, 1992, and 1993, with peak rates of several hundred meteors per hour observed. Finnish astronomer Esko Lyytinen calculated that the Earth could enter into an extra thick debris field left behind by Comet Swift–Tuttle in 2028, which could possibly produce a Perseids meteor storm on the night of August 11–12, 2028. A peak rate of at least 1,000 meteors per hour is possible at the zenith, which was projected to be around 1:30 am EDT (05:30 UTC) on August 12.

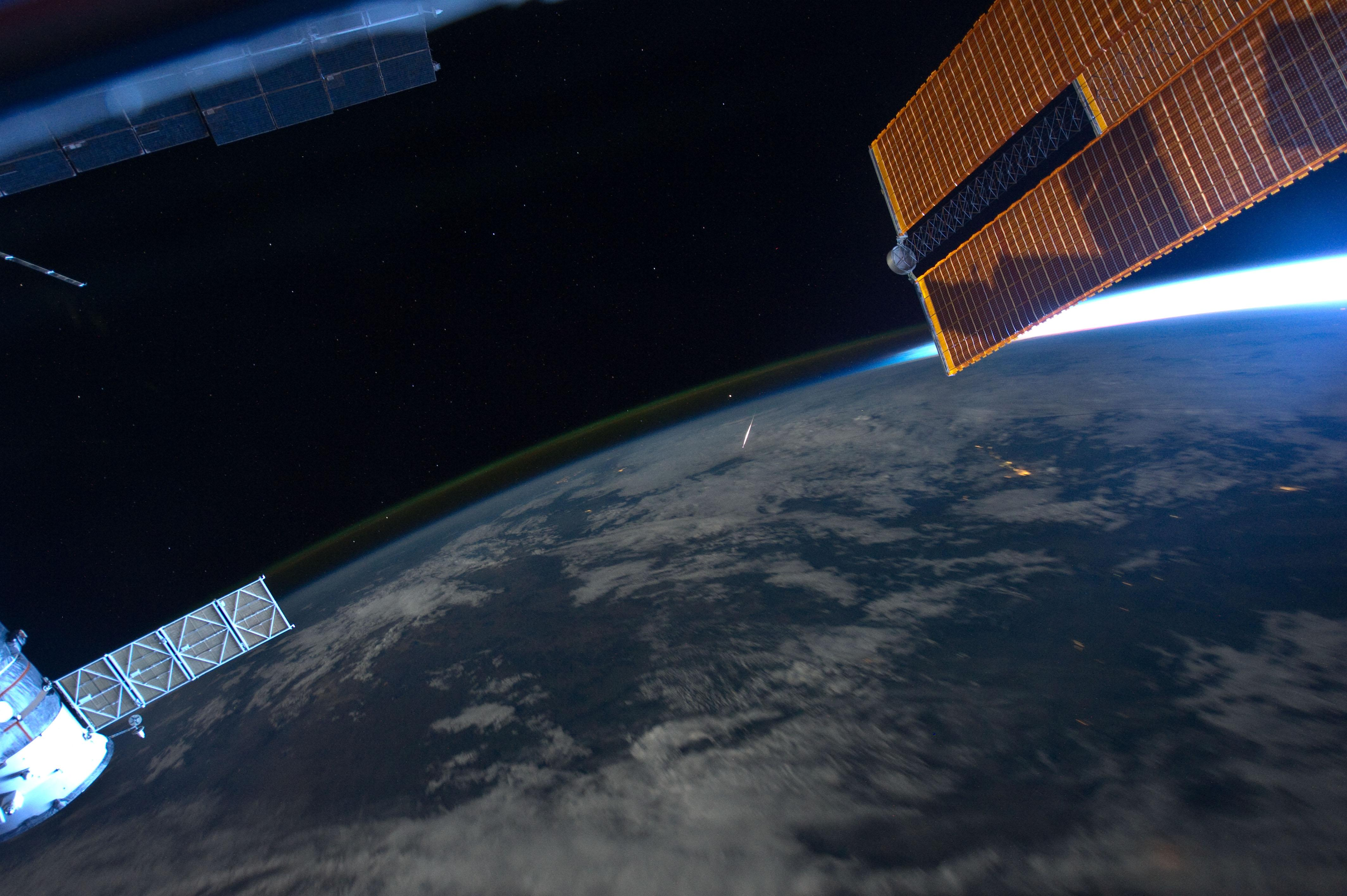
Observation from the International Space Station at Earth orbit

== In popular culture ==
In his 2006 novel Against the Day, American novelist Thomas Pynchon refers to the Perseid meteor shower being watched by three characters west of the Dolores Valley after playing a game of tarot. In the TV series Curious George, season 7 episode 1b, George and his friends Allie and Bill hunt for the Perseids, which they believe are creatures that look like purses. At the end of the episode, Allie's grandfather Mr. Renkins says that the Perseids is a meteor shower happening in early August.

John Denver's song "Rocky Mountain High" references the showers with the lyric, "I've seen it raining fire in the sky."

== See also ==
- Leonids, associated with the comet Tempel–Tuttle
- Asteroid impact prediction
- Earth-grazing fireball
- List of asteroid close approaches to Earth
- Meteoroid

== General and cited references ==
- Littman, Mark, The Heavens on Fire: The Great Leonid Meteor Storms, Cambridge, Cambridge University Press, 1998. ISBN 0521624053. Chapter 6, "The Discovery of the August Meteors", pp. 83–100.
