= Meteor shower =

Celestial event caused by streams of meteoroids entering Earth's atmosphere

Eta Aquariids meteor shower, with zodiacal light and planets marked and labeled

A meteor shower is a celestial event in which a number of meteors are observed to radiate, or originate, from one point in the night sky. These meteors are caused by streams of cosmic debris called meteoroids entering Earth's atmosphere at extremely high speeds on parallel trajectories. Most meteors are smaller than a grain of sand, so almost all of them disintegrate and never hit the Earth's surface. Very intense or unusual meteor showers are known as meteor outbursts and meteor storms, which produce at least 1,000 meteors an hour, most notably from the Leonids. The Meteor Data Centre lists over 900 suspected meteor showers of which about 100 are well established. Several organizations point to viewing opportunities on the Internet. NASA maintains a daily map of active meteor showers.

Historically, meteor showers were regarded as an atmospheric phenomenon. In 1794, Ernst Chladni proposed that meteors originated in outer space. The Great Meteor Storm of 1833 led Denison Olmsted to show it arrived as a cloud of space dust, with the streaks forming a radiant point in the direction of the constellation of Leo. In 1866, Giovanni Schiaparelli proposed that meteors came from comets when he showed that the Leonid meteor shower shared the same orbit as the Comet Tempel. Astronomers learned to compute the orbits of these clouds of cometary dust, including how they are perturbed by planetary gravity. Fred Whipple in 1951 proposed that comets are "dirty snowballs" that shed meteoritic debris as their volatiles are ablated by solar energy in the inner Solar System.

== Historical developments ==
Historical records suggest that Spartan observations of meteor showers occurred as early as 1200 BCE. There are detailed records from ancient archives showing they were observed from China, Japan, and Korea. There are multiple chronicles where Medieval Arabs recorded meteor showers, as they regarded them as good omens. A meteor shower in August 1583 was recorded in the Timbuktu manuscripts by Mahmud Kati. The Lyrids meteor shower is the oldest such event to be continuously recorded, with records in China dating back to 687 BCE.

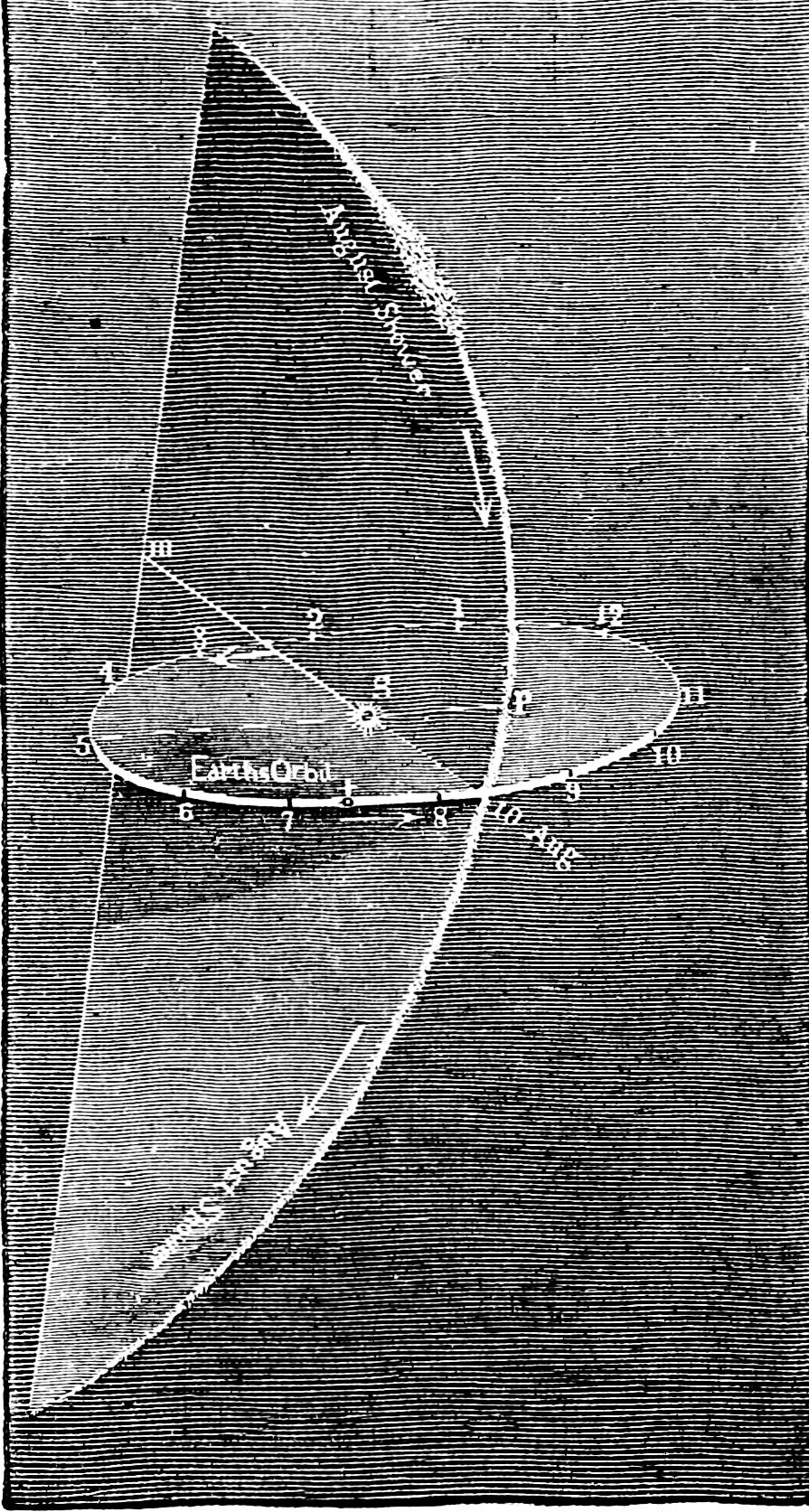
Diagram from 1872

In 1789, Antoine Lavoisier published the first modern chemistry textbook titled, Traité Élémentaire de Chimie. In it, he speculated that dust rising into the upper atmosphere could be consolidated into lumps of matter by lightning, forming fiery meteors as they plummeted to the ground. At the start of the 19th century, this became one of the most favored hypothesis for the formation on meteors. However, in 1794, German scientist Ernst Chladni proposed that meteorites originated in outer space, and as evidence he published a book linking fireballs to iron meteorites. This proposal was initially met with disbelief from some scientists, initially including Alexander von Humboldt, as it contradicted Isaac Newton's statement that space must be empty for planets to continue along their orbits.

In the modern era, the first great meteor storm was the Leonids of November 1833. One estimate is a peak rate of over one hundred thousand meteors an hour. Another, done as the storm abated, estimated more than two hundred thousand meteors during the 9 hours of the storm, over the entire region of North America east of the Rocky Mountains. American Denison Olmsted (1791–1859) explained the event most accurately. After spending the last weeks of 1833 collecting information, he presented his findings in January 1834 to the American Journal of Science and Arts, published in January–April 1834, and January 1836. He noted the shower was of short duration and was not seen in Europe, and that the meteors radiated from a point in the constellation of Leo. He speculated the meteors had originated from a cloud of particles in space. Work continued, yet coming to understand the annual nature of showers though the occurrences of storms perplexed researchers.

The Italian astronomer Giovanni Schiaparelli ascertained the relation between meteors and comets in a series of letters to Angelo Secchi late in 1866. He was able to demonstrate that the Leonid meteor shower shared the same orbit as the Comet Tempel. Biela's Comet, discovered in 1772 and identified as periodic in 1826, was observed to have two components in 1846. During the 1852 return, both components were fainter and had a greater separation. In 1868, Edmund Weiss determined that the Earth would intersect the orbit of this comet in 1872, and a strong meteor shower was observed at that time. This meteor stream, now referred to as the Andromedids, further established the connection between comets and meteor showers.

In the 1890s, Irish astronomer George Johnstone Stoney (1826–1911) and British astronomer Arthur Matthew Weld Downing (1850–1917) were the first to attempt to calculate the position of the dust at Earth's orbit, taking into account the gravitational perturbations of Jupiter. They studied the dust ejected in 1866 by comet 55P/Tempel-Tuttle before the anticipated Leonid shower return of 1898 and 1899. Meteor storms were expected, but the final calculations showed that most of the dust would be far inside Earth's orbit. The same results were independently arrived at by Adolf Berberich of the Königliches Astronomisches Rechen Institut (Royal Astronomical Computation Institute) in Berlin, Germany. Although the absence of meteor storms that season confirmed the calculations, the advance of much better computing tools was needed to arrive at reliable predictions.

In 1981, Donald K. Yeomans of the Jet Propulsion Laboratory reviewed the history of meteor showers for the Leonids and the history of the dynamic orbit of Comet Tempel-Tuttle. A graph from it was adapted and re-published in Sky and Telescope. It showed relative positions of the Earth and Tempel-Tuttle and marks where Earth encountered dense dust. This showed that the meteoroids are mostly behind and outside the path of the comet, but paths of the Earth through the cloud of particles resulting in powerful storms were very near paths of nearly no activity.

In 1985, E. D. Kondrat'eva and E. A. Reznikov of Kazan State University first correctly identified the years when dust was released which was responsible for several previous Leonid meteor storms. In 1995, Peter Jenniskens predicted the 1995 Alpha Monocerotids outburst from dust trails. In anticipation of the 1999 Leonid storm, Robert H. McNaught, David Asher, and Finland's Esko Lyytinen were the first to apply this method in the West. In 2006 Jenniskens published predictions for future dust trail encounters covering the next 50 years. Jérémie Vaubaillon continues to update predictions based on observations each year for the Institut de Mécanique Céleste et de Calcul des Éphémérides (IMCCE).

== Radiant point ==
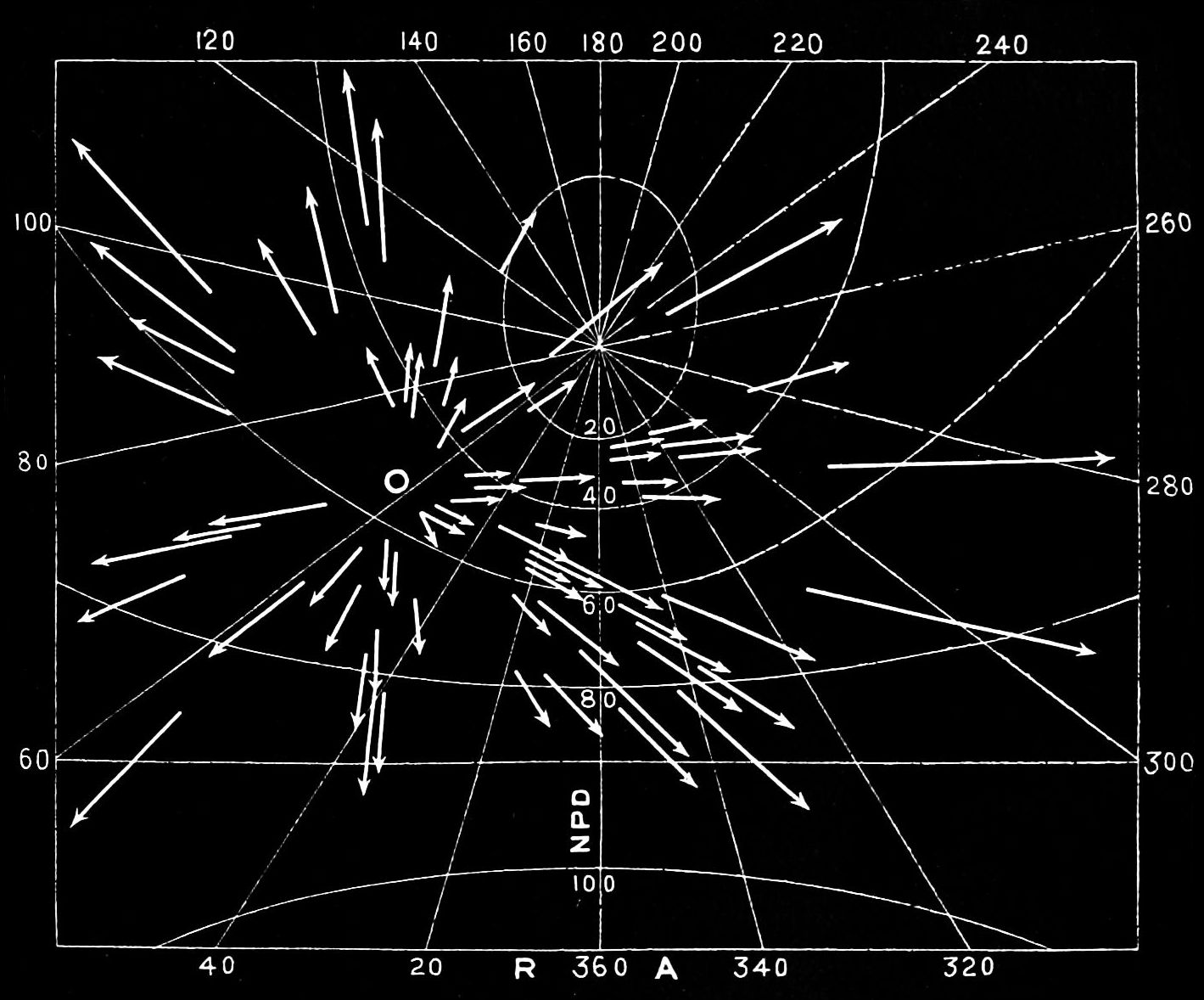
Meteor shower on chart

Because meteor shower particles are all traveling in parallel paths and at the same velocity, they will appear to an observer below to radiate away from a single point in the sky. This radiant point is caused by the effect of perspective, similar to parallel railroad tracks converging at a single vanishing point on the horizon. Meteor showers are normally named after the constellation from which the meteors appear to originate. This "fixed point" slowly moves across the sky during the night due to the Earth turning on its axis, the same reason the stars appear to slowly march across the sky. The radiant also moves slightly from night to night against the background stars (radiant drift) due to the Earth moving in its orbit around the Sun. See IMO Meteor Shower Calendar 2017 (International Meteor Organization) for maps of drifting "fixed points".

The geocentric velocity of the meteors can vary considerably between showers. For example, the velocity is around 27 km/s for the Taurids and 71 km/s for the Leonids. (Compare to the Earth's average orbital velocity of 29.8 km/s.) Incoming meteors produce a measureable light curve along their trajectory, which varies in brightness by the rate of ablation. The observed heights for meteor ionization is from 70 to 110 km, where the atmosphere is sufficiently dense to heat the projectiles. A typical meteor in a shower has a diameter of 5 μm with a density of 2 g cm^{−3}. It starts to melt at a temperature of around 1800 K.

As the Earth rotates, the shower rate will be low when the radiant point is near the horizon, then it will rise to at least 50% of maximum when the radiant point reaches an altitude of 30° above the horizon. Optimum viewing is when the radiant point is at an angle of 45°, or half way up the sky, as the meteors are still passing through a thicker column of air. The longer, more prominent trails will then be observed 30–60° away from the radiant point. Most meteor showers improve their visibility after midnight, as the observer's position becomes more oriented toward the direction of the Earth's orbit around the Sun. For this reason, the best viewing time for a meteor shower is generally slightly before dawn — a compromise between the maximum number of meteors available for viewing and the brightening sky, which makes them harder to see.

== Naming ==
Meteor showers are named after the nearest constellation, or bright star with a Greek or Roman letter assigned that is close to the radiant position at the peak of the shower, whereby the grammatical declension of the Latin possessive form is replaced by "id" or "ids." Hence, meteors radiating from near the star Delta Aquarii (declension "-i") are called the Delta Aquariids. The International Astronomical Union's Working Group on Meteor Shower Nomenclature and the IAU's Meteor Data Center keep track of meteor shower nomenclature and which showers are established.

== Origin of meteoroid streams ==
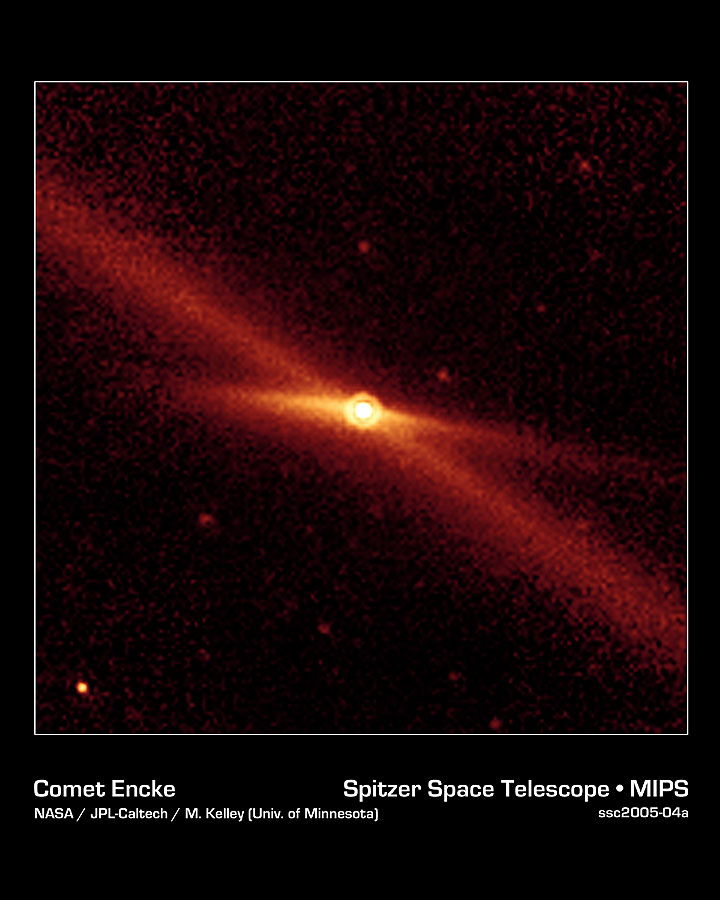
Comet Encke's meteoroid trail is the diagonal red glow.

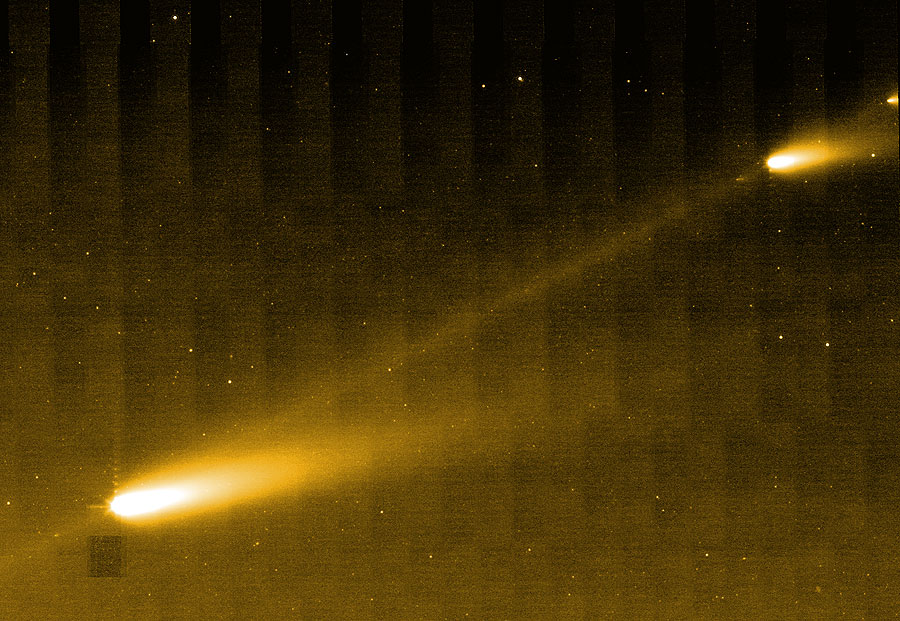
Meteoroid trail between fragments of Comet 73P

A meteor shower results from an interaction between a planet, such as Earth, and streams of debris from a comet (or occasionally an asteroid). Comets can produce debris by water vapor drag, as demonstrated by Fred Whipple in 1951, and by breakup. Whipple envisioned comets as "dirty snowballs", made up of rock embedded in ice, orbiting the Sun. The "ice" may be water, methane, ammonia, or other volatiles, alone or in combination. The "rock" may vary in size from a dust mote to a small boulder. Dust mote sized solids are orders of magnitude more common than those the size of sand grains, which, in turn, are similarly more common than those the size of pebbles, and so on. When the ice warms and sublimates, the vapor can drag along dust, sand, and pebbles.

Each time a comet swings by the Sun in its orbit, some of its ice vaporizes, and a certain number of meteoroids will be shed. The meteoroids spread out along the entire trajectory of the comet to form a meteoroid stream, also known as a "dust trail" (as opposed to a comet's "gas tail" caused by the tiny particles that are quickly blown away by solar radiation pressure).

Recently, Peter Jenniskens has argued that most of our short-period meteor showers are not from the normal water vapor drag of active comets, but the product of infrequent disintegrations, when large chunks break off a mostly dormant comet. Examples are the Quadrantids and Geminids, which originated from a breakup of asteroid-looking objects, (196256) 2003 EH1 and 3200 Phaethon, respectively, about 500 and 1000 years ago. The fragments tend to fall apart quickly into dust, sand, and pebbles and spread out along the comet's orbit to form a dense meteoroid stream, which subsequently evolves into Earth's path.

== Dynamical evolution of meteoroid streams ==
Shortly after Whipple predicted that dust particles traveled at low speeds relative to the comet, Milos Plavec was the first to offer the idea of a dust trail, when he calculated how meteoroids, once freed from the comet, would drift mostly in front of or behind the comet after completing one orbit. The effect is simple celestial mechanics – the material drifts only a little laterally away from the comet while drifting ahead or behind the comet because some particles make a wider orbit than others. These dust trails are sometimes observed in comet images taken at mid infrared wavelengths (heat radiation), where dust particles from the previous return to the Sun are spread along the orbit of the comet.

The gravitational pull of the planets determines where the dust trail would pass by Earth orbit, much like a gardener directing a hose to water a distant plant. Most years, those trails would miss the Earth altogether, but in some years, the Earth is showered by meteors. This effect was first demonstrated from observations of the 1995 alpha Monocerotids, and from earlier not widely known identifications of past Earth storms.

Over more extended periods, the dust trails can evolve in complicated ways. For example, the orbits of some repeating comets, and meteoroids leaving them, are in resonant orbits with Jupiter or one of the other large planets – so many revolutions of one will equal another number of the other. This creates a shower component called a filament.

A second effect is a close encounter with a planet. When the meteoroids pass by Earth, some are accelerated (making wider orbits around the Sun), others are decelerated (making shorter orbits), resulting in gaps in the dust trail in the next return (like opening a curtain, with grains piling up at the beginning and end of the gap). Also, Jupiter's perturbation can dramatically change sections of the dust trail, especially for a short period comets, when the grains approach the giant planet at their furthest point along the orbit around the Sun, moving most slowly. As a result, the trail has a clumping, a braiding or a tangling of crescents, of each release of material.

The third effect is that of radiation pressure which will push less massive particles into orbits further from the Sun – while more massive objects (responsible for bolides or fireballs) will tend to be affected less by radiation pressure. This makes some dust trail encounters rich in bright meteors, others rich in faint meteors. Over time, these effects disperse the meteoroids and create a broader stream. The meteors we see from these streams are part of annual showers, because Earth encounters those streams every year at much the same rate.

When the meteoroids collide with other meteoroids in the zodiacal cloud, they lose their stream association and become part of the "sporadic meteors" background. Long since dispersed from any stream or trail, they form isolated meteors, not a part of any shower. These random meteors will not appear to come from the radiant of the leading shower.

== Meteor storm ==
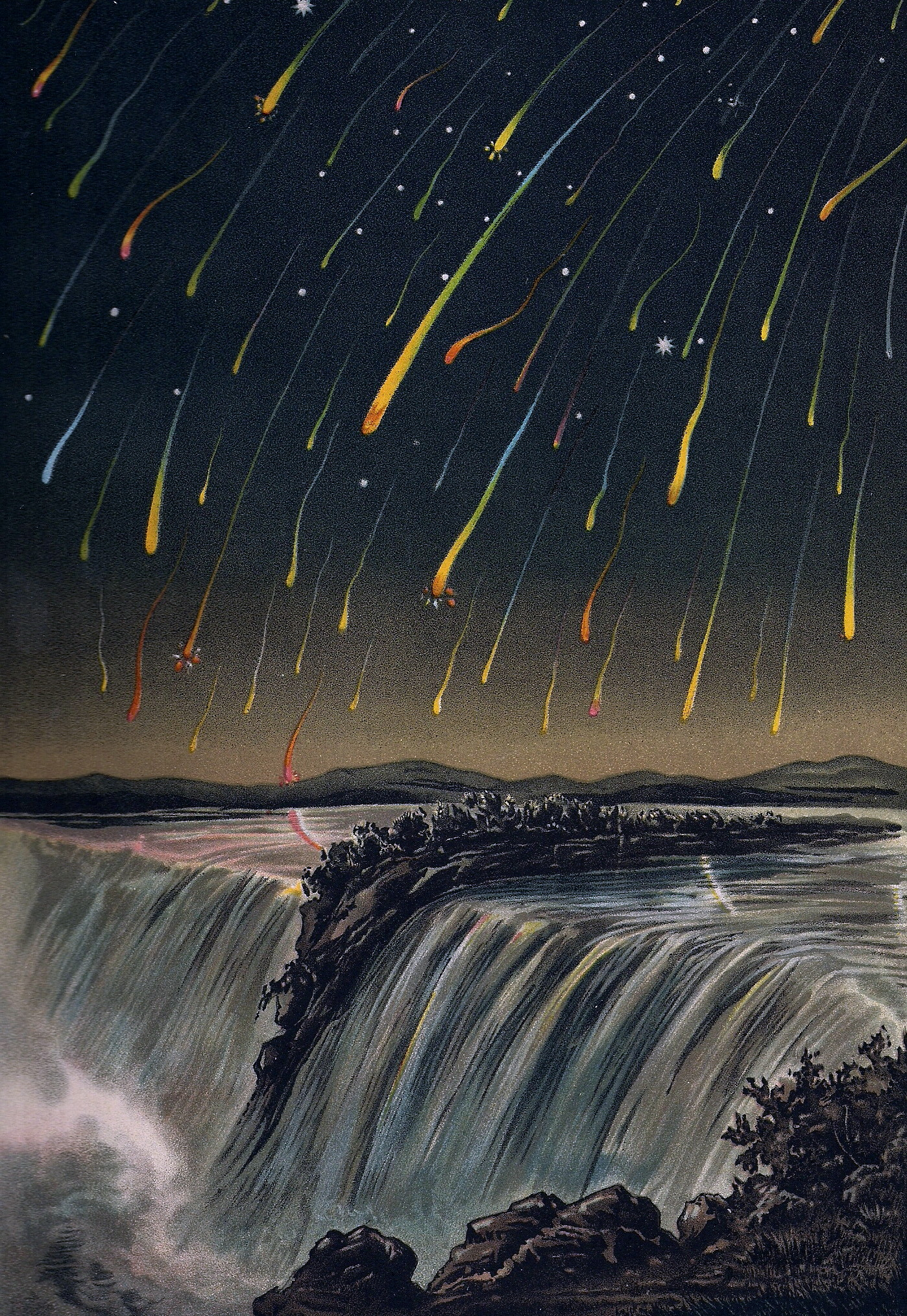
Artwork of the 1833 Leonid meteor storm, as seen from Niagara Falls in North America, on the night of November 12–13

A meteor storm is an enhanced version of a meteor shower, featuring at least 1,000 meteors per hour, which is 10 times as much as the most prolific meteor showers. Famous examples include the Leonids and the Draconids, with the Leonids being the most well-known source of meteor storms. Meteor storms have been described as resembling stars falling from the sky, or even "fireworks". The most intense occurrences have featured rates of over 150,000 meteors per hour, and even 240,000 meteors per hour, also from the Leonids. Leonid meteor storms occur roughly once every 33 years, coinciding with the return of Comet Tempel–Tuttle, with past Leonid meteor storms being documented in 1767, 1799, 1833, 1866, 1868, 1966, 1999, 2001, and 2002. The 1833 and 1966 Leonid meteor storms were the most intense ones by far, with those meteor storms each recording peak rates that easily exceeded 120,000 meteors per hour. Astronomers don't anticipate the next Leonid meteor storm until around 2034 or even 2099. The Draconids produced meteor storms in 1933 and 1946, with zenithal hourly rates of thousands of meteors per hour observed, making them some of the most impressive meteor storms observed in the 20th century. Astronomers predicted another potentially prolific Draconid meteor storm in 2098, with peak rates potentially reaching 20,000 meteors per hour. Finnish astronomer Esko Lyytinen also predicted a potential Perseids meteor storm in August 2028, with peak rates of at least 1,000 meteors per hour possible.

== Famous meteor showers ==
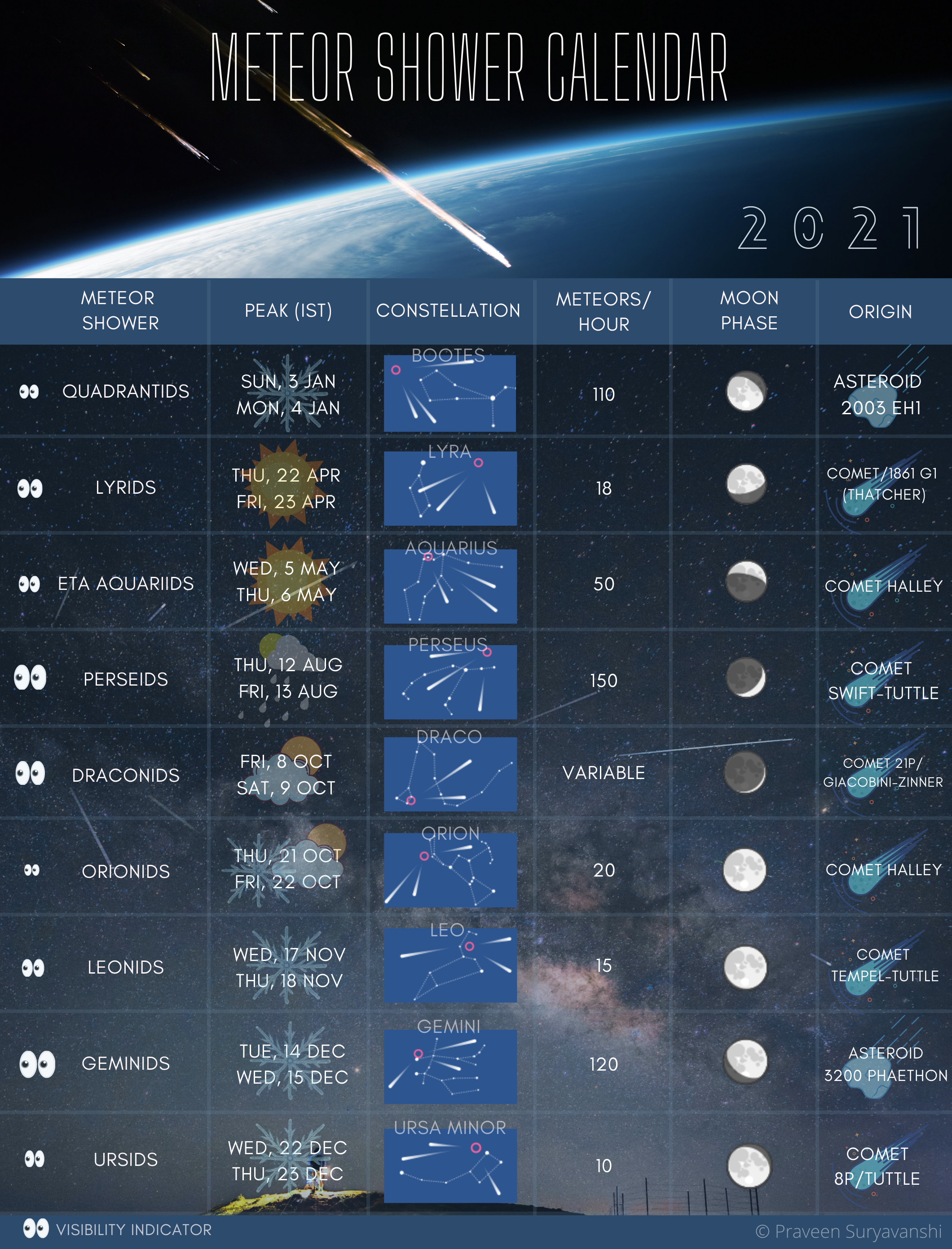
Meteor shower calendar for 2021 shows the peak dates, radiant point, ZHR, and origins of the meteors

The peak rate of a meteor shower is measured by the zenith hourly rate (ZHR), which is the expected number of meteors visible to the naked eye when the radiant point is at the zenith; that is, at the highest point in the night sky. For younger streams that are more clumpy, the rate can vary year to year with peak meteor "storms" occurring with the orbital period of the stream. Some storms have measured hundreds and even thousands of meteors per hour. The showers typically showing the highest ZHR are the Perseids (75/hr), Geminids (75/hr), and Quadrantids (60/hr).

=== Perseids and Leonids ===
In most years, the most reliable meteor shower is the Perseids, which peak on 12 August of each year at over one meteor per minute. NASA has an estimator tool to calculate how many meteors per hour are visible from one's observing location.

The Leonid meteor shower peaks around 17 November of each year. In multiples of 33 years, the Leonid shower produces a meteor storm peaking at rates of thousands of meteors per hour. Leonid storms gave birth to the term meteor shower when it was first realised that, during the November 1833 storm, the meteors radiated from near the star Gamma Leonis. The last Leonid storms were in 1999, 2001 (two), and 2002 (two). Before that, there were storms in 1767, 1799, 1833, 1866, 1867, and 1966. When the Leonid shower is not storming, it is less active than the Perseids.

=== Other meteor showers ===
==== Established meteor showers ====
Official names are given in the International Astronomical Union's list of meteor showers.

Shower	Time	Parent object
Quadrantids	early January	The same as the parent object of minor planet 2003 EH1, and Comet C/1490 Y1. Comet C/1385 U1 has also been studied as a possible source.
Lyrids	late April	Comet Thatcher
Pi Puppids (periodic)	late April	Comet 26P/Grigg–Skjellerup
Eta Aquariids	early May	Comet 1P/Halley
Arietids	mid-June	Comet 96P/Machholz, Marsden and Kracht comet groups complex
Beta Taurids	late June	Comet 2P/Encke
June Bootids (periodic)	late June	Comet 7P/Pons-Winnecke
Southern Delta Aquariids	late July	Comet 96P/Machholz, Marsden and Kracht comet groups complex
Alpha Capricornids	late July	Comet 169P/NEAT
Perseids	mid-August	Comet 109P/Swift-Tuttle
Kappa Cygnids	mid-August	Minor planet (361861) 2008 ED69
Aurigids (periodic)	early September	Comet C/1911 N1 (Kiess)
Draconids (periodic)	early October	Comet 21P/Giacobini-Zinner
Orionids	late October	Comet 1P/Halley
Southern Taurids	early November	Comet 2P/Encke
Northern Taurids	mid-November	Minor planet 2004 TG10 and others
Andromedids (periodic)	mid-November	Comet 3D/Biela
Alpha Monocerotids (periodic)	mid-November	unknown
Leonids	mid-November	Comet 55P/Tempel-Tuttle
Phoenicids (periodic)	early December	Comet 289P/Blanpain
Geminids	mid-December	Minor planet 3200 Phaethon
Ursids	late December	Comet 8P/Tuttle
Canis-Minorids		

== Extraterrestrial meteor showers ==
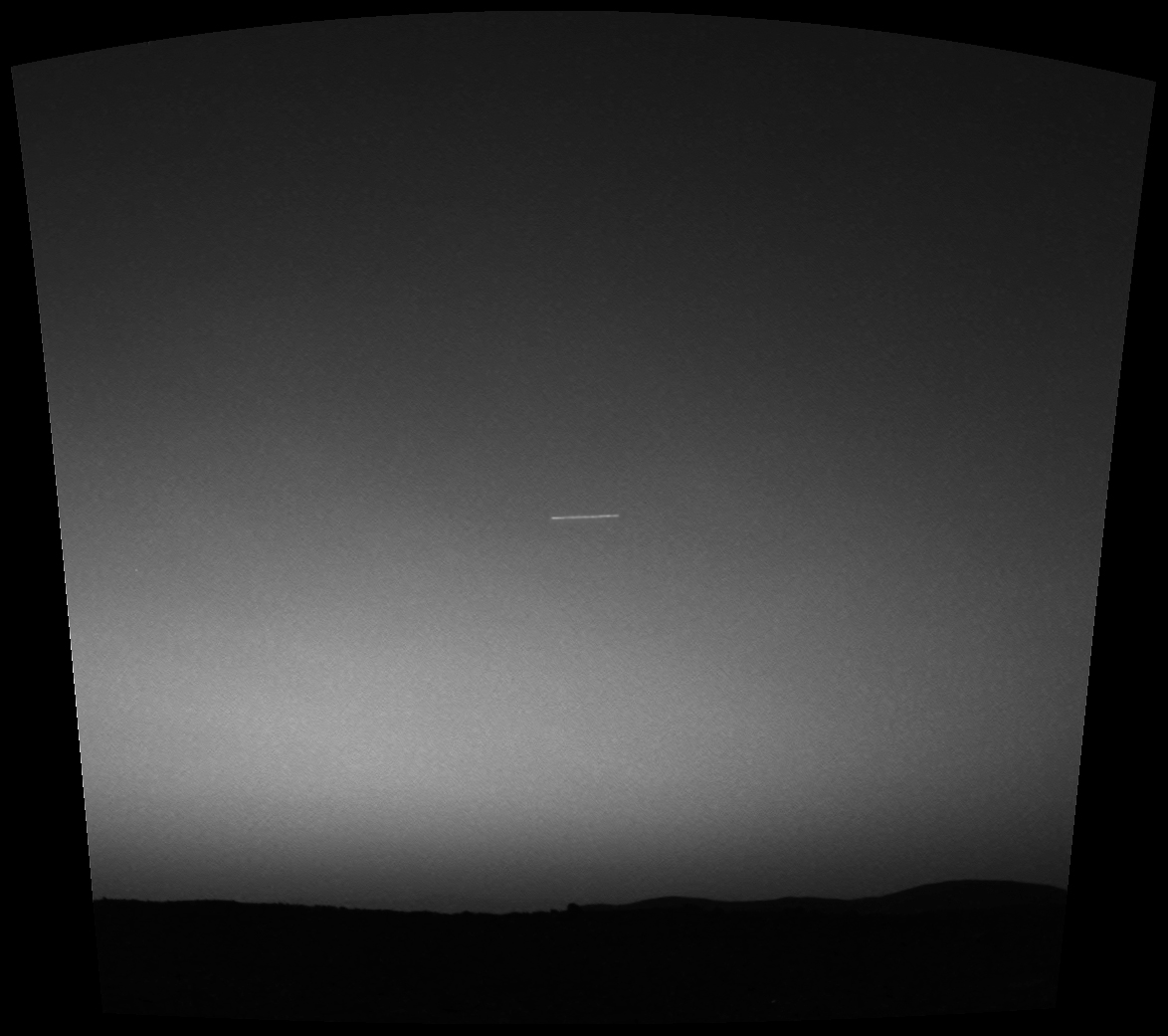
Mars meteor by MER Spirit rover

Any other Solar System body with a reasonably transparent atmosphere can also have meteor showers. As the Moon is in the neighborhood of Earth it can experience the same showers, but will have its own phenomena due to its lack of an atmosphere per se, such as vastly increasing its sodium tail. NASA now maintains an ongoing database of observed impacts on the moon maintained by the Marshall Space Flight Center whether from a shower or not.

Many planets and moons have impact craters dating back large spans of time. But new craters, perhaps even related to meteor showers are possible. Mars, and thus its moons, is known to have meteor showers. These have not been observed on other planets as yet but may be presumed to exist. For Mars in particular, although these are different from the ones seen on Earth because of the different orbits of Mars and Earth relative to the orbits of comets. The Martian atmosphere has less than one percent of the density of Earth's at ground level; at their upper edges, where meteoroids strike, the two are more similar. Because of the similar air pressure at altitudes for meteors, the effects are much the same. Only the relatively slower motion of the meteoroids due to increased distance from the sun should marginally decrease meteor brightness. This is somewhat balanced because the slower descent means that Martian meteors have more time to ablate.

On March 7, 2004, the panoramic camera on Mars Exploration Rover Spirit recorded a streak which is now believed to have been caused by a meteor from a Martian meteor shower associated with comet 114P/Wiseman-Skiff. A strong display from this shower was expected on December 20, 2007. Other showers speculated about are a "Lambda Geminid" shower associated with the Eta Aquariids of Earth (i.e., both associated with Comet 1P/Halley), a "Beta Canis Major" shower associated with Comet 13P/Olbers, and "Draconids" from 5335 Damocles.

Isolated massive impacts have been observed at Jupiter: The 1994 Comet Shoemaker–Levy 9 which formed a brief trail as well, and successive events since then (see List of Jupiter events.) Meteors or meteor showers have been discussed for most of the objects in the Solar System with an atmosphere: Mercury, Venus, Saturn's moon Titan, Neptune's moon Triton, and Pluto.

== See also ==
- American Meteor Society (AMS)
- Earth-grazing fireball
- International Meteor Organization (IMO)
- List of meteor showers
- Meteor procession
- North American Meteor Network (NAMN)
- Radiant – point in the sky from which meteors appear to originate
