= Radiant (meteor shower) =

Celestial point in the sky from which meteors appear to originate

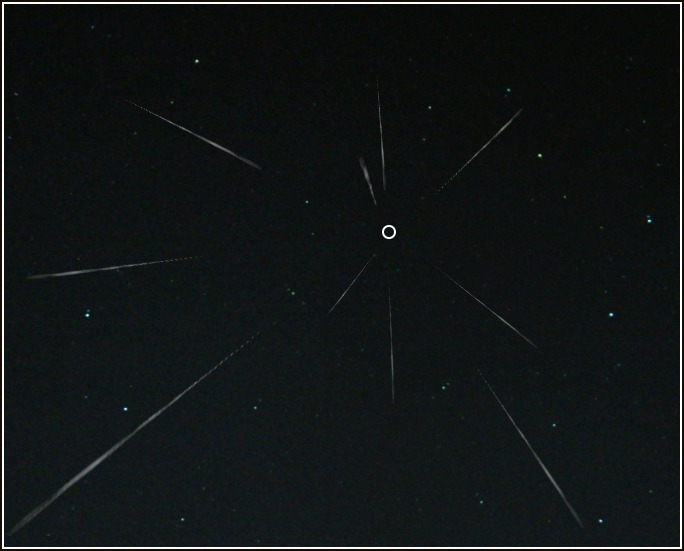
Image of a meteor shower, with the radiant marked by 'ᴏ'

The radiant or apparent radiant of a meteor shower is the celestial point in the sky from which (from the point of view of a terrestrial observer) the paths of meteors appear to originate. The Perseids, for example, are meteors which appear to come from a point within the constellation of Perseus.

Meteor paths appear at random locations in the sky, but the apparent paths of two or more meteors from the same shower will diverge from the radiant. The radiant is the vanishing point of the meteor paths, which are parallel lines in three-dimensional space, as seen from the perspective of the observer, who views a two-dimensional projection against the sky. The geometric effect is identical to crepuscular rays, where parallel sunbeams appear to diverge.

A meteor that does not point back to the known radiant for a given shower is known as a sporadic and is not considered part of that shower.

Shower meteors may appear a short time before the radiant has risen in the observer's eastern sky. The radiant in such cases is above the horizon at the meteor's altitude.

During the active period of most showers, the radiant moves nearly one degree eastwards, parallel to the ecliptic, against the stellar background each day. This is called the radiant's diurnal drift, and is to a large degree due to the Earth's own orbital motion around the Sun, which also proceeds at nearly one degree a day. As the radiant is determined by the superposition of the motions of Earth and meteoroid, the changing orbital direction of the Earth towards the east causes the radiant to move to the east as well.

== Cause ==
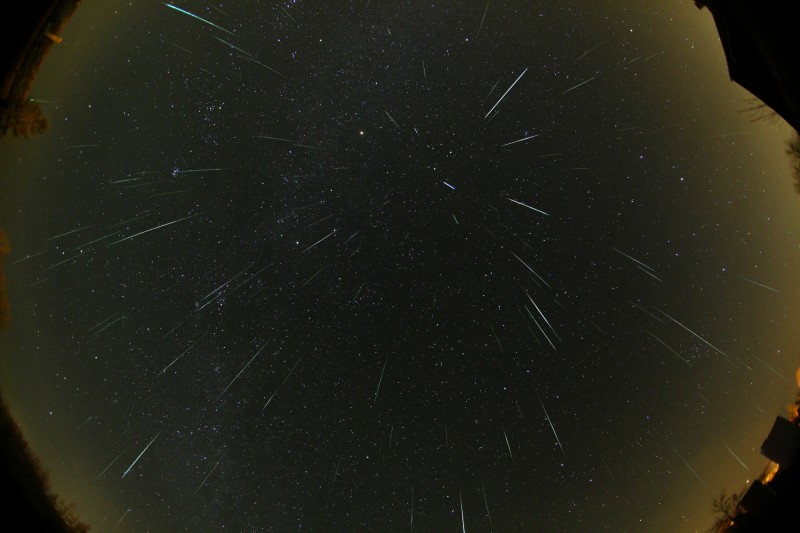
Geminid meteors, clearly showing the position of the radiant

Meteor showers are mostly caused by the trails of dust and debris left in the wake of a comet. This dust continues to move along the comet's wake, and when the Earth moves through such debris, a meteor shower results. Because all of the debris is moving in roughly the same direction, the meteors which strike the atmosphere all "point" back to the direction of the comet's path.

As an exception, the Geminids are a shower caused by the object 3200 Phaethon, which is thought to be a Palladian asteroid.

== Observation ==
The radiant is an important factor in observation. If the radiant point is at or below the horizon, then few if any meteors will be observed. This is because the atmosphere shields the Earth from most of the debris, and only those meteors which happen to be travelling exactly (or very near) tangential to the Earth's surface will be viewable.

Here are the radiant points of some major meteor showers of the year.

Meteor Shower	Radiant Point
Quadrantids	Constellation Boötes, near the former constellation Quadrans Muralis
Alpha Centaurids	Constellation Centaurus, near the star Alpha Centauri
Lyrids	Constellation Lyra, near the star Vega
Eta Aquariids	Constellation Aquarius, near the star Eta Aquarii
Arietids	Constellation Aries
Southern Delta Aquariids	Constellation Aquarius, near the star Delta Aquarii
Alpha Capricornids	Constellation Capricornus
Perseids	Constellation Perseus
Aurigids	Constellation Auriga, near the star Capella
Draconids	Constellation Draco
Orionids	Constellation Orion, near the star Betelgeuse
Southern Taurids	Constellation Taurus, near the star Aldebaran
Northern Taurids	Constellation Taurus
Leonids	Constellation Leo, near the star Regulus
Geminids	Constellation Gemini
Ursids	Constellation Ursa Minor, near the star Kochab
