= 6063 Jason =

Near-Earth asteroid

Jason
Discovery
- Discovered by: Carolyn S. Shoemaker and Eugene Merle Shoemaker
- Discovery site: Palomar
- Discovery date: 27 May 1984

Designations
- Pronunciation: /ˈdʒeɪsən/
- Named after: Jason
- Alternative designations: 1984 KB

Orbital characteristics
- Epoch 13 January 2016 (JD 2457400.5)
- Uncertainty parameter 0
- Observation arc: 20042 days (54.87 yr)
- Earliest precovery date: 22 October 1960
- Aphelion: 3.9085 AU (584.70 Gm)
- Perihelion: 0.51677 AU (77.308 Gm)
- Semi-major axis: 2.2126 AU (331.00 Gm)
- Eccentricity: 0.76645
- Orbital period (sidereal): 3.29 yr (1202.2 d)
- Mean anomaly: 223.847°
- Mean motion: 0° 17^{m} 58.056^{s} / day
- Inclination: 4.9212°
- Longitude of ascending node: 169.443°
- Argument of perihelion: 337.103°
- Earth MOID: 0.0744625 AU (11.13943 Gm)

Physical characteristics
- Mean diameter: 1.4 km
- Synodic rotation period: 51.7 h (2.15 d)
- Geometric albedo: 0.21
- Absolute magnitude (H): 15.9

6063 Jason (prov. designation: 1984 KB) is an Apollo asteroid discovered on 27 May 1984, by Carolyn and Eugene Shoemaker at Palomar. Its highly eccentric orbit crosses the orbits of Mars, Earth, and Venus. From 1800 to 2200 it approached a planet within 30 million km 69 times: Mercury 11, Venus 27, Earth 18, and Mars 13 times.

Jason has an Earth minimum orbit intersection distance of 0.074 AU (11.1 million km) and is associated with the Beta Taurids and Northern and Southern Taurids (Taurid Complex).
