= Arietids =

Annual meteor shower in May and June

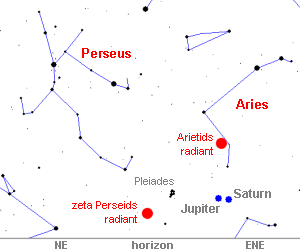
- Appearance of the eastern sky at 5:00 am on June 7, 2000 from a mid-northern latitude observing site.
- Discovery date: 1947

Radiant
- Constellation: Aries
- Right ascension: 03^{h} 02^{m}
- Declination: +25°

Properties
- Occurs during: May 22 – June 24
- Date of peak: June 7–8
- Velocity: 39–41 km/s
- Zenithal hourly rate: 60 (radar); ~1 (visual)

The Arietids are a strong meteor shower that lasts from May 22 to July 2 each year, and peaks on June 7. The Arietids, along with the Zeta Perseids, are the most intense daylight meteor showers of the year. The source of the shower is unknown, but scientists suspect that they come from the asteroid 1566 Icarus, although the orbit also corresponds similarly to 96P/Machholz.

First discovered at Jodrell Bank Observatory in England during the summer of 1947, the showers are caused when the Earth passes through a dense portion of two interplanetary meteoroid streams, producing an average of 60 shooting stars each hour, that originate in the sky from the constellation Aries and the constellation Perseus. However, because both constellations are so close to the Sun when these showers reach their peak, the showers are difficult to view with the naked eye. Some of the early meteors are visible in the very early hours of the morning, usually an hour before dawn. The meteors strike Earth's atmosphere at speeds around 39 km/s.

Radiant migration 2019
Date	Radiant	Degrees west of the Sun
May 18	01:48 (027) +21	26 (HD 10883)
May 25	02:14 (034) +22 western Aries	26 (HD 13572)
June 1	02:36 (039) +23 central Aries	27 (HD 16198)
June 8	03:02 (046) +25 eastern Aries	28 (HD 18737)
June 15	03:24 (051) +26	30 (60 Arietis)
June 22	03:51 (058) +27 western Taurus	30 (HD 283022)

By June 22 the radiant has migrated to the constellation Taurus (3h 51m +27) which is the same constellation that the Beta Taurids peak on June 28.
