= List of minor planets: 828001–829000 =

The following is a partial list of minor planets, running from minor-planet number 828001 through 829000, inclusive. The primary data for this and other partial lists is based on JPL's "Small-Body Orbital Elements" and data available from the Minor Planet Center. Critical list information is also provided by the MPC, unless otherwise specified from Lowell Observatory. A detailed description of the table's columns and additional sources are given on the main page including a complete list of every page in this series, and a statistical break-up on the dynamical classification of minor planets.

Also see the summary list of all named bodies in numerical and alphabetical order, and the corresponding naming citations for the number range of this particular list. New namings may only be added to this list after official publication, as the preannouncement of names is condemned by the Working Group for Small Bodies Nomenclature of the International Astronomical Union.

Near-Earth obj.	MBA (inner)	MBA (outer)	Centaur
Mars-crosser	MBA (middle)	Jupiter trojan	Trans-Neptunian obj.
Unclassified

== 828001–828100 ==
Designation			Discovery			Properties		Ref
Permanent	Provisional	Named after	Date	Site	Discoverer(s)	Category	Diam.	Ref
828001	2003 BV_{98}	—	March 10, 2007	Mount Lemmon	Mount Lemmon Survey	·	850 m	MPC · JPL
828002	2003 BB_{99}	—	December 8, 2015	Mount Lemmon	Mount Lemmon Survey	·	1.5 km	MPC · JPL
828003	2003 BP_{99}	—	August 26, 2005	Palomar	NEAT	·	1.5 km	MPC · JPL
828004	2003 BW_{99}	—	November 2, 2007	Mount Lemmon	Mount Lemmon Survey	LIX	2.2 km	MPC · JPL
828005	2003 BV_{100}	—	December 27, 2006	Mount Lemmon	Mount Lemmon Survey	·	910 m	MPC · JPL
828006	2003 BS_{101}	—	July 26, 2010	WISE	WISE	·	1.5 km	MPC · JPL
828007	2003 BW_{101}	—	January 25, 2003	Sacramento Peak	SDSS	3:2	4.2 km	MPC · JPL
828008	2003 BD_{102}	—	January 30, 2009	Mount Lemmon	Mount Lemmon Survey	·	2.4 km	MPC · JPL
828009	2003 BJ_{103}	—	January 31, 2009	Mount Lemmon	Mount Lemmon Survey	·	2.4 km	MPC · JPL
828010	2003 CB_{22}	—	February 8, 2003	Mauna Kea	S. S. Sheppard, D. C. Jewitt	3:2	3.6 km	MPC · JPL
828011	2003 CL_{27}	—	October 22, 2006	Kitt Peak	Spacewatch	ARM	2.7 km	MPC · JPL
828012	2003 CA_{28}	—	October 12, 2017	Mount Lemmon	Mount Lemmon Survey	EOS	1.3 km	MPC · JPL
828013	2003 DA_{9}	—	February 23, 2003	Kitt Peak	Spacewatch	·	570 m	MPC · JPL
828014	2003 DU_{15}	—	February 25, 2003	Campo Imperatore	CINEOS	·	930 m	MPC · JPL
828015	2003 DZ_{20}	—	February 9, 2003	Haleakala	NEAT	H	500 m	MPC · JPL
828016	2003 EX_{53}	—	March 11, 2003	Nogales	P. R. Holvorcem, M. Schwartz	H	360 m	MPC · JPL
828017	2003 ED_{64}	—	March 10, 2003	Kitt Peak	Spacewatch	3:2	4.1 km	MPC · JPL
828018	2003 FC	—	March 22, 2003	Palomar	NEAT	T_{j} (2.98)	2.6 km	MPC · JPL
828019	2003 FN	—	March 22, 2003	Palomar	NEAT	·	1.5 km	MPC · JPL
828020	2003 FR_{22}	—	March 25, 2003	Haleakala	NEAT	PHO	710 m	MPC · JPL
828021	2003 FD_{40}	—	March 24, 2003	Kitt Peak	Spacewatch	PHO	930 m	MPC · JPL
828022	2003 FH_{42}	—	March 31, 2003	Wrightwood	J. W. Young	(1547)	1.7 km	MPC · JPL
828023	2003 FQ_{135}	—	December 31, 2007	Kitt Peak	Spacewatch	·	2.0 km	MPC · JPL
828024	2003 FF_{136}	—	April 28, 2014	Haleakala	Pan-STARRS 1	·	1.9 km	MPC · JPL
828025	2003 FB_{137}	—	January 12, 2010	Mount Lemmon	Mount Lemmon Survey	PHO	700 m	MPC · JPL
828026	2003 FO_{137}	—	May 9, 2010	WISE	WISE	·	2.2 km	MPC · JPL
828027	2003 FP_{137}	—	March 23, 2003	Sacramento Peak	SDSS	·	1.2 km	MPC · JPL
828028	2003 FK_{140}	—	March 23, 2003	Sacramento Peak	SDSS	·	1.4 km	MPC · JPL
828029	2003 FY_{141}	—	March 23, 2003	Sacramento Peak	SDSS	·	1.6 km	MPC · JPL
828030	2003 GZ_{9}	—	March 26, 2003	Palomar	NEAT	·	1.4 km	MPC · JPL
828031	2003 GZ_{58}	—	April 5, 2003	Kitt Peak	Spacewatch	·	820 m	MPC · JPL
828032	2003 GK_{60}	—	September 23, 2011	Haleakala	Pan-STARRS 1	·	2.1 km	MPC · JPL
828033	2003 GA_{61}	—	April 9, 2003	Palomar	NEAT	·	810 m	MPC · JPL
828034	2003 GL_{61}	—	April 1, 2003	Sacramento Peak	SDSS	·	2.4 km	MPC · JPL
828035	2003 GJ_{65}	—	December 17, 2009	Kitt Peak	Spacewatch	·	1.0 km	MPC · JPL
828036	2003 GK_{65}	—	February 10, 2015	Mount Lemmon	Mount Lemmon Survey	·	810 m	MPC · JPL
828037	2003 GC_{67}	—	April 1, 2003	Sacramento Peak	SDSS	EOS	1.4 km	MPC · JPL
828038	2003 HA_{7}	—	April 24, 2003	Kitt Peak	Spacewatch	·	480 m	MPC · JPL
828039	2003 HR_{36}	—	April 29, 2003	Kitt Peak	Spacewatch	·	2.4 km	MPC · JPL
828040	2003 HE_{62}	—	April 13, 2013	Haleakala	Pan-STARRS 1	·	510 m	MPC · JPL
828041	2003 HJ_{62}	—	June 15, 2012	Kitt Peak	Spacewatch	·	1.2 km	MPC · JPL
828042	2003 HR_{62}	—	April 29, 2003	Kitt Peak	Spacewatch	(1547)	1.3 km	MPC · JPL
828043	2003 HY_{64}	—	December 25, 2005	Kitt Peak	Spacewatch	PHO	800 m	MPC · JPL
828044	2003 HL_{65}	—	March 28, 2014	Mount Lemmon	Mount Lemmon Survey	·	820 m	MPC · JPL
828045	2003 JS_{18}	—	May 6, 2003	Kitt Peak	Spacewatch	MAS	610 m	MPC · JPL
828046	2003 JT_{20}	—	May 1, 2003	Sacramento Peak	SDSS	H	350 m	MPC · JPL
828047	2003 JW_{20}	—	May 5, 2003	Kitt Peak	Spacewatch	·	920 m	MPC · JPL
828048	2003 JD_{21}	—	February 14, 2010	Kitt Peak	Spacewatch	NYS	690 m	MPC · JPL
828049	2003 KM	—	May 22, 2003	Wrightwood	J. W. Young	·	2.7 km	MPC · JPL
828050	2003 KC_{8}	—	May 23, 2003	Kitt Peak	Spacewatch	·	1.2 km	MPC · JPL
828051	2003 KM_{10}	—	May 25, 2003	Kitt Peak	Spacewatch	·	470 m	MPC · JPL
828052	2003 KS_{20}	—	May 29, 2003	Cerro Tololo	Deep Ecliptic Survey	·	2.3 km	MPC · JPL
828053	2003 KT_{22}	—	May 30, 2003	Cerro Tololo	Deep Ecliptic Survey	·	750 m	MPC · JPL
828054	2003 KK_{38}	—	March 27, 2014	Mount Lemmon	Mount Lemmon Survey	PHO	840 m	MPC · JPL
828055	2003 KU_{39}	—	May 25, 2003	Kitt Peak	Spacewatch	·	2.1 km	MPC · JPL
828056	2003 LY_{11}	—	June 4, 2003	Kitt Peak	Spacewatch	·	1.3 km	MPC · JPL
828057	2003 MK_{13}	—	January 14, 2018	Mount Lemmon	Mount Lemmon Survey	·	2.2 km	MPC · JPL
828058	2003 NM_{3}	—	July 4, 2003	Socorro	LINEAR	·	840 m	MPC · JPL
828059	2003 NF_{14}	—	July 8, 2003	Palomar	NEAT	THB	2.7 km	MPC · JPL
828060	2003 NG_{14}	—	November 11, 2013	Kitt Peak	Spacewatch	·	1.5 km	MPC · JPL
828061	2003 NG_{15}	—	July 3, 2003	Kitt Peak	Spacewatch	EUN	980 m	MPC · JPL
828062	2003 OY_{2}	—	July 22, 2003	Palomar	NEAT	·	1.3 km	MPC · JPL
828063	2003 OH_{6}	—	July 22, 2003	Campo Imperatore	CINEOS	·	1.1 km	MPC · JPL
828064	2003 OV_{35}	—	July 28, 2003	Palomar	NEAT	MAR	840 m	MPC · JPL
828065	2003 PV_{3}	—	August 2, 2003	Haleakala	NEAT	·	2.6 km	MPC · JPL
828066	2003 QF_{29}	—	August 23, 2003	Palomar	NEAT	·	910 m	MPC · JPL
828067	2003 QX_{42}	—	August 22, 2003	Palomar	NEAT	·	1.5 km	MPC · JPL
828068	2003 QL_{65}	—	July 24, 2003	Palomar	NEAT	·	2.7 km	MPC · JPL
828069	2003 QO_{74}	—	July 24, 2003	Palomar	NEAT	·	2.8 km	MPC · JPL
828070	2003 QP_{110}	—	August 31, 2003	Kitt Peak	Spacewatch	·	530 m	MPC · JPL
828071	2003 QN_{116}	—	August 29, 2003	Mauna Kea	D. D. Balam	·	2.0 km	MPC · JPL
828072	2003 QZ_{118}	—	August 26, 2003	Cerro Tololo	Deep Ecliptic Survey	·	880 m	MPC · JPL
828073	2003 QC_{122}	—	May 9, 2013	Haleakala	Pan-STARRS 1	·	490 m	MPC · JPL
828074	2003 QJ_{124}	—	January 14, 2019	Haleakala	Pan-STARRS 1	·	1.2 km	MPC · JPL
828075	2003 QN_{124}	—	August 26, 2003	Cerro Tololo	Deep Ecliptic Survey	·	1.3 km	MPC · JPL
828076	2003 QA_{126}	—	October 21, 2008	Kitt Peak	Spacewatch	·	1.1 km	MPC · JPL
828077	2003 QL_{126}	—	August 27, 2003	Palomar	NEAT	·	1.9 km	MPC · JPL
828078	2003 QZ_{126}	—	August 26, 2003	Cerro Tololo	Deep Ecliptic Survey	KOR	1.0 km	MPC · JPL
828079	2003 RQ_{11}	—	September 16, 2003	Kitt Peak	Spacewatch	·	1.3 km	MPC · JPL
828080	2003 RV_{11}	—	September 15, 2003	Palomar	NEAT	·	720 m	MPC · JPL
828081	2003 RG_{28}	—	January 15, 2010	WISE	WISE	·	2.1 km	MPC · JPL
828082	2003 SA_{7}	—	September 16, 2003	Palomar	NEAT	·	2.7 km	MPC · JPL
828083	2003 SG_{14}	—	September 17, 2003	Kitt Peak	Spacewatch	JUN	960 m	MPC · JPL
828084	2003 SU_{34}	—	September 18, 2003	Kitt Peak	Spacewatch	·	960 m	MPC · JPL
828085	2003 SE_{68}	—	September 17, 2003	Kitt Peak	Spacewatch	EUN	710 m	MPC · JPL
828086	2003 SW_{72}	—	September 18, 2003	Kitt Peak	Spacewatch	(12739)	1.0 km	MPC · JPL
828087	2003 SL_{83}	—	September 18, 2003	Kitt Peak	Spacewatch	LIX	2.8 km	MPC · JPL
828088	2003 SP_{88}	—	August 20, 2003	Palomar	NEAT	·	2.5 km	MPC · JPL
828089	2003 SR_{92}	—	September 18, 2003	Kitt Peak	Spacewatch	·	1.2 km	MPC · JPL
828090	2003 SC_{109}	—	September 20, 2003	Kitt Peak	Spacewatch	·	2.9 km	MPC · JPL
828091	2003 SC_{130}	—	September 18, 2003	Kitt Peak	Spacewatch	EUP	2.5 km	MPC · JPL
828092	2003 SB_{135}	—	September 18, 2003	Kitt Peak	Spacewatch	NYS	690 m	MPC · JPL
828093	2003 SJ_{154}	—	September 22, 2003	Haleakala	NEAT	AMO	540 m	MPC · JPL
828094	2003 SW_{186}	—	September 18, 2003	Socorro	LINEAR	·	1.1 km	MPC · JPL
828095	2003 SG_{187}	—	September 23, 2003	Palomar	NEAT	T_{j} (2.97)	2.8 km	MPC · JPL
828096	2003 SE_{205}	—	September 23, 2003	Palomar	NEAT	·	1.9 km	MPC · JPL
828097	2003 ST_{213}	—	September 25, 2003	Palomar	NEAT	·	1.2 km	MPC · JPL
828098	2003 SD_{239}	—	September 27, 2003	Kitt Peak	Spacewatch	·	1.8 km	MPC · JPL
828099	2003 SO_{239}	—	September 18, 2003	Kitt Peak	Spacewatch	·	1.5 km	MPC · JPL
828100	2003 SK_{243}	—	September 18, 2003	Kitt Peak	Spacewatch	·	1.3 km	MPC · JPL

== 828101–828200 ==
back to top

Designation			Discovery			Properties		Ref
Permanent	Provisional	Named after	Date	Site	Discoverer(s)	Category	Diam.	Ref
828101	2003 SG_{246}	—	September 17, 2003	Kitt Peak	Spacewatch	·	1.4 km	MPC · JPL
828102	2003 SH_{260}	—	August 24, 2003	Socorro	LINEAR	·	1.5 km	MPC · JPL
828103	2003 SW_{280}	—	September 18, 2003	Palomar	NEAT	·	1.1 km	MPC · JPL
828104	2003 SR_{290}	—	September 28, 2003	Kitt Peak	Spacewatch	NYS	860 m	MPC · JPL
828105	2003 SH_{292}	—	September 25, 2003	Palomar	NEAT	·	1.2 km	MPC · JPL
828106	2003 SQ_{302}	—	September 20, 2003	Kitt Peak	Spacewatch	·	2.3 km	MPC · JPL
828107	2003 SZ_{306}	—	September 30, 2003	Kitt Peak	Spacewatch	·	2.3 km	MPC · JPL
828108	2003 SL_{319}	—	September 27, 2003	Socorro	LINEAR	·	590 m	MPC · JPL
828109	2003 SF_{326}	—	September 18, 2003	Palomar	NEAT	·	490 m	MPC · JPL
828110	2003 SR_{326}	—	September 18, 2003	Kitt Peak	Spacewatch	·	490 m	MPC · JPL
828111	2003 SD_{327}	—	September 18, 2003	Kitt Peak	Spacewatch	NEM	1.4 km	MPC · JPL
828112	2003 ST_{330}	—	October 2, 2003	Kitt Peak	Spacewatch	·	2.0 km	MPC · JPL
828113	2003 SE_{331}	—	October 20, 2003	Kitt Peak	Spacewatch	·	1.6 km	MPC · JPL
828114	2003 SM_{334}	—	September 29, 2003	Kitt Peak	Spacewatch	·	2.2 km	MPC · JPL
828115	2003 SC_{335}	—	September 30, 2003	Kitt Peak	Spacewatch	·	1.2 km	MPC · JPL
828116	2003 SE_{336}	—	September 26, 2003	Sacramento Peak	SDSS	·	1.5 km	MPC · JPL
828117	2003 SG_{336}	—	September 26, 2003	Sacramento Peak	SDSS	·	1.4 km	MPC · JPL
828118	2003 SJ_{336}	—	November 19, 2003	Palomar	NEAT	·	1.4 km	MPC · JPL
828119	2003 SV_{338}	—	September 26, 2003	Sacramento Peak	SDSS	·	1.6 km	MPC · JPL
828120	2003 SL_{339}	—	October 23, 2003	Kitt Peak	Spacewatch	·	530 m	MPC · JPL
828121	2003 SH_{340}	—	October 2, 2003	Kitt Peak	Spacewatch	·	1.3 km	MPC · JPL
828122	2003 SG_{342}	—	September 17, 2003	Kitt Peak	Spacewatch	EUN	830 m	MPC · JPL
828123	2003 SB_{343}	—	September 17, 2003	Kitt Peak	Spacewatch	·	1.9 km	MPC · JPL
828124	2003 SG_{343}	—	August 21, 2003	Campo Imperatore	CINEOS	·	2.3 km	MPC · JPL
828125	2003 SP_{345}	—	September 18, 2003	Palomar	NEAT	·	910 m	MPC · JPL
828126	2003 SH_{346}	—	September 18, 2003	Kitt Peak	Spacewatch	·	2.1 km	MPC · JPL
828127	2003 SA_{351}	—	September 19, 2003	Palomar	NEAT	·	460 m	MPC · JPL
828128	2003 SB_{354}	—	September 22, 2003	Anderson Mesa	LONEOS	VER	2.4 km	MPC · JPL
828129	2003 SZ_{359}	—	September 21, 2003	Kitt Peak	Spacewatch	·	2.5 km	MPC · JPL
828130	2003 SV_{362}	—	September 22, 2003	Kitt Peak	Spacewatch	·	470 m	MPC · JPL
828131	2003 SH_{366}	—	September 16, 2003	Kitt Peak	Spacewatch	·	910 m	MPC · JPL
828132	2003 SU_{366}	—	September 26, 2003	Sacramento Peak	SDSS	·	860 m	MPC · JPL
828133	2003 SR_{372}	—	September 26, 2003	Sacramento Peak	SDSS	EUN	810 m	MPC · JPL
828134	2003 SC_{373}	—	September 26, 2003	Sacramento Peak	SDSS	·	2.2 km	MPC · JPL
828135	2003 SL_{373}	—	September 28, 2003	Kitt Peak	Spacewatch	KOR	960 m	MPC · JPL
828136	2003 SB_{374}	—	September 18, 2003	Kitt Peak	Spacewatch	·	400 m	MPC · JPL
828137	2003 SX_{374}	—	September 28, 2003	Kitt Peak	Spacewatch	·	1.1 km	MPC · JPL
828138	2003 SB_{376}	—	September 26, 2003	Sacramento Peak	SDSS	·	1.1 km	MPC · JPL
828139	2003 SX_{377}	—	September 26, 2003	Sacramento Peak	SDSS	·	680 m	MPC · JPL
828140	2003 SH_{378}	—	January 15, 2005	Kitt Peak	Spacewatch	·	1.4 km	MPC · JPL
828141	2003 SK_{378}	—	September 28, 2003	Kitt Peak	Spacewatch	KOR	960 m	MPC · JPL
828142	2003 SS_{378}	—	September 18, 2003	Kitt Peak	Spacewatch	·	1.0 km	MPC · JPL
828143	2003 SC_{380}	—	September 26, 2003	Sacramento Peak	SDSS	·	1.1 km	MPC · JPL
828144	2003 SX_{381}	—	September 26, 2003	Sacramento Peak	SDSS	·	1.1 km	MPC · JPL
828145	2003 SC_{382}	—	September 26, 2003	Sacramento Peak	SDSS	·	1.2 km	MPC · JPL
828146	2003 SU_{382}	—	September 26, 2003	Sacramento Peak	SDSS	VER	1.9 km	MPC · JPL
828147	2003 SZ_{382}	—	September 30, 2003	Kitt Peak	Spacewatch	·	490 m	MPC · JPL
828148	2003 SC_{385}	—	September 30, 2003	Kitt Peak	Spacewatch	MAR	610 m	MPC · JPL
828149	2003 SW_{387}	—	October 2, 2003	Kitt Peak	Spacewatch	·	870 m	MPC · JPL
828150	2003 SX_{388}	—	September 26, 2003	Sacramento Peak	SDSS	HYG	2.2 km	MPC · JPL
828151	2003 SR_{391}	—	March 4, 2005	Mount Lemmon	Mount Lemmon Survey	·	1.2 km	MPC · JPL
828152	2003 SD_{393}	—	September 26, 2003	Sacramento Peak	SDSS	·	1.6 km	MPC · JPL
828153	2003 SL_{394}	—	October 5, 2003	Kitt Peak	Spacewatch	·	430 m	MPC · JPL
828154	2003 SP_{396}	—	September 26, 2003	Sacramento Peak	SDSS	·	860 m	MPC · JPL
828155	2003 SN_{398}	—	September 26, 2003	Sacramento Peak	SDSS	·	1.1 km	MPC · JPL
828156	2003 ST_{398}	—	September 26, 2003	Sacramento Peak	SDSS	·	600 m	MPC · JPL
828157	2003 SX_{399}	—	October 22, 2003	Kitt Peak	Spacewatch	·	1.4 km	MPC · JPL
828158	2003 SF_{401}	—	September 26, 2003	Sacramento Peak	SDSS	·	2.0 km	MPC · JPL
828159	2003 SN_{401}	—	September 26, 2003	Sacramento Peak	SDSS	·	2.3 km	MPC · JPL
828160	2003 SE_{402}	—	September 26, 2003	Sacramento Peak	SDSS	·	1.7 km	MPC · JPL
828161	2003 SA_{403}	—	September 27, 2003	Kitt Peak	Spacewatch	·	570 m	MPC · JPL
828162	2003 SH_{403}	—	September 27, 2003	Kitt Peak	Spacewatch	HYG	1.5 km	MPC · JPL
828163	2003 SW_{403}	—	September 27, 2003	Sacramento Peak	SDSS	·	3.1 km	MPC · JPL
828164	2003 SF_{405}	—	September 27, 2003	Sacramento Peak	SDSS	·	2.5 km	MPC · JPL
828165	2003 SZ_{405}	—	September 27, 2003	Sacramento Peak	SDSS	VER	2.1 km	MPC · JPL
828166	2003 SO_{407}	—	September 27, 2003	Sacramento Peak	SDSS	LIX	2.8 km	MPC · JPL
828167	2003 ST_{411}	—	September 29, 2003	Kitt Peak	Spacewatch	·	1.6 km	MPC · JPL
828168	2003 SV_{411}	—	September 29, 2003	Kitt Peak	Spacewatch	VER	2.0 km	MPC · JPL
828169	2003 SM_{413}	—	September 28, 2003	Sacramento Peak	SDSS	·	940 m	MPC · JPL
828170	2003 SR_{413}	—	September 29, 2003	Kitt Peak	Spacewatch	·	1.2 km	MPC · JPL
828171	2003 SU_{414}	—	September 17, 2003	Kitt Peak	Spacewatch	·	720 m	MPC · JPL
828172	2003 SY_{416}	—	September 28, 2003	Sacramento Peak	SDSS	·	1.7 km	MPC · JPL
828173	2003 SK_{417}	—	September 28, 2003	Sacramento Peak	SDSS	·	1.6 km	MPC · JPL
828174	2003 SO_{417}	—	September 28, 2003	Sacramento Peak	SDSS	·	510 m	MPC · JPL
828175	2003 SR_{419}	—	September 28, 2003	Sacramento Peak	SDSS	LIX	2.6 km	MPC · JPL
828176	2003 SB_{420}	—	September 28, 2003	Sacramento Peak	SDSS	LIX	2.5 km	MPC · JPL
828177	2003 SF_{422}	—	September 26, 2003	Sacramento Peak	SDSS	·	2.1 km	MPC · JPL
828178	2003 SB_{424}	—	November 4, 2007	Kitt Peak	Spacewatch	MAS	470 m	MPC · JPL
828179	2003 SW_{426}	—	September 28, 2003	Sacramento Peak	SDSS	·	1.9 km	MPC · JPL
828180	2003 SW_{435}	—	September 28, 2003	Anderson Mesa	LONEOS	·	570 m	MPC · JPL
828181	2003 SX_{443}	—	September 11, 2010	Catalina	CSS	·	720 m	MPC · JPL
828182	2003 SL_{444}	—	May 4, 2010	WISE	WISE	·	1.3 km	MPC · JPL
828183	2003 SQ_{445}	—	September 22, 2003	Kitt Peak	Spacewatch	AGN	820 m	MPC · JPL
828184	2003 SZ_{445}	—	September 29, 2003	Kitt Peak	Spacewatch	·	2.9 km	MPC · JPL
828185	2003 SB_{446}	—	September 27, 2003	Kitt Peak	Spacewatch	VER	1.9 km	MPC · JPL
828186	2003 SP_{446}	—	September 16, 2003	Kitt Peak	Spacewatch	·	420 m	MPC · JPL
828187	2003 SY_{446}	—	September 18, 2003	Kitt Peak	Spacewatch	V	390 m	MPC · JPL
828188	2003 SX_{447}	—	September 16, 2003	Kitt Peak	Spacewatch	THM	1.5 km	MPC · JPL
828189	2003 SG_{448}	—	June 8, 2016	Haleakala	Pan-STARRS 1	·	1.4 km	MPC · JPL
828190	2003 SQ_{448}	—	September 18, 2003	Kitt Peak	Spacewatch	·	1.7 km	MPC · JPL
828191	2003 SJ_{449}	—	September 26, 2003	Sacramento Peak	SDSS	·	2.0 km	MPC · JPL
828192	2003 ST_{450}	—	September 30, 2003	Kitt Peak	Spacewatch	H	430 m	MPC · JPL
828193	2003 SH_{452}	—	April 27, 2012	Haleakala	Pan-STARRS 1	·	490 m	MPC · JPL
828194	2003 SV_{453}	—	September 19, 2014	Haleakala	Pan-STARRS 1	·	1.8 km	MPC · JPL
828195	2003 SE_{454}	—	October 9, 2012	Mount Lemmon	Mount Lemmon Survey	HNS	810 m	MPC · JPL
828196	2003 SF_{454}	—	July 27, 2017	Haleakala	Pan-STARRS 1	·	1.4 km	MPC · JPL
828197	2003 ST_{454}	—	June 24, 2011	Mount Lemmon	Mount Lemmon Survey	·	970 m	MPC · JPL
828198	2003 SR_{455}	—	September 26, 2003	Sacramento Peak	SDSS	·	1.7 km	MPC · JPL
828199	2003 SS_{455}	—	August 8, 2013	Kitt Peak	Spacewatch	·	1.4 km	MPC · JPL
828200	2003 SZ_{455}	—	January 4, 2012	Mount Lemmon	Mount Lemmon Survey	·	840 m	MPC · JPL

== 828201–828300 ==
back to top

Designation			Discovery			Properties		Ref
Permanent	Provisional	Named after	Date	Site	Discoverer(s)	Category	Diam.	Ref
828201	2003 SF_{456}	—	September 20, 2003	Kitt Peak	Spacewatch	EOS	1.5 km	MPC · JPL
828202	2003 SV_{456}	—	March 16, 2012	Mount Lemmon	Mount Lemmon Survey	V	520 m	MPC · JPL
828203	2003 SD_{457}	—	September 18, 2003	Kitt Peak	Spacewatch	·	1.3 km	MPC · JPL
828204	2003 SZ_{458}	—	January 7, 2006	Mount Lemmon	Mount Lemmon Survey	·	2.9 km	MPC · JPL
828205	2003 SE_{459}	—	January 20, 2012	Kitt Peak	Spacewatch	TIR	2.3 km	MPC · JPL
828206	2003 SQ_{460}	—	September 16, 2003	Kitt Peak	Spacewatch	·	450 m	MPC · JPL
828207	2003 SD_{461}	—	September 20, 2003	Kitt Peak	Spacewatch	LIX	2.6 km	MPC · JPL
828208	2003 ST_{461}	—	March 23, 2012	Mount Lemmon	Mount Lemmon Survey	·	2.1 km	MPC · JPL
828209	2003 SZ_{461}	—	August 28, 2014	Haleakala	Pan-STARRS 1	·	870 m	MPC · JPL
828210	2003 SG_{463}	—	September 21, 2003	Kitt Peak	Spacewatch	LEO	1.1 km	MPC · JPL
828211	2003 SZ_{464}	—	September 18, 2003	Kitt Peak	Spacewatch	EOS	1.2 km	MPC · JPL
828212	2003 ST_{466}	—	August 26, 2003	Cerro Tololo	Deep Ecliptic Survey	·	1.1 km	MPC · JPL
828213	2003 SH_{467}	—	September 19, 2003	Kitt Peak	Spacewatch	·	2.1 km	MPC · JPL
828214	2003 SN_{467}	—	September 27, 2003	Kitt Peak	Spacewatch	·	2.1 km	MPC · JPL
828215	2003 ST_{467}	—	September 21, 2003	Kitt Peak	Spacewatch	·	900 m	MPC · JPL
828216	2003 SR_{469}	—	September 20, 2003	Kitt Peak	Spacewatch	·	1.7 km	MPC · JPL
828217	2003 SQ_{470}	—	September 16, 2003	Kitt Peak	Spacewatch	·	2.1 km	MPC · JPL
828218	2003 SY_{470}	—	September 19, 2003	Kitt Peak	Spacewatch	URS	2.4 km	MPC · JPL
828219	2003 SH_{474}	—	September 27, 2003	Kitt Peak	Spacewatch	·	700 m	MPC · JPL
828220	2003 SQ_{474}	—	September 26, 2003	Sacramento Peak	SDSS	·	1.7 km	MPC · JPL
828221	2003 SX_{474}	—	September 28, 2003	Sacramento Peak	SDSS	·	710 m	MPC · JPL
828222	2003 SA_{476}	—	September 18, 2003	Palomar	NEAT	·	820 m	MPC · JPL
828223	2003 SL_{477}	—	September 26, 2003	Sacramento Peak	SDSS	·	1.3 km	MPC · JPL
828224	2003 TW	—	September 17, 2003	Kitt Peak	Spacewatch	·	2.2 km	MPC · JPL
828225	2003 TF_{2}	—	October 5, 2003	Wrightwood	J. W. Young	·	3.1 km	MPC · JPL
828226	2003 TO_{21}	—	September 29, 2003	Kitt Peak	Spacewatch	KOR	1.0 km	MPC · JPL
828227	2003 TJ_{23}	—	October 1, 2003	Kitt Peak	Spacewatch	·	2.1 km	MPC · JPL
828228	2003 TM_{44}	—	October 3, 2003	Kitt Peak	Spacewatch	·	2.0 km	MPC · JPL
828229	2003 TY_{45}	—	October 3, 2003	Kitt Peak	Spacewatch	·	1.3 km	MPC · JPL
828230	2003 TJ_{53}	—	October 5, 2003	Kitt Peak	Spacewatch	·	1.4 km	MPC · JPL
828231	2003 TV_{61}	—	September 11, 2007	Mount Lemmon	Mount Lemmon Survey	·	1.3 km	MPC · JPL
828232	2003 TF_{64}	—	August 4, 2008	Siding Spring	SSS	·	2.8 km	MPC · JPL
828233	2003 TM_{65}	—	October 2, 2003	Kitt Peak	Spacewatch	·	2.2 km	MPC · JPL
828234	2003 UP_{2}	—	October 16, 2003	Kitt Peak	Spacewatch	·	1.4 km	MPC · JPL
828235	2003 UM_{10}	—	September 27, 2003	Socorro	LINEAR	·	1.9 km	MPC · JPL
828236	2003 UC_{34}	—	September 29, 2003	Kitt Peak	Spacewatch	·	2.4 km	MPC · JPL
828237	2003 UL_{46}	—	October 18, 2003	Kitt Peak	Spacewatch	·	1.1 km	MPC · JPL
828238	2003 UB_{68}	—	September 22, 2003	Kitt Peak	Spacewatch	·	940 m	MPC · JPL
828239	2003 UG_{69}	—	September 27, 2003	Kitt Peak	Spacewatch	THM	1.7 km	MPC · JPL
828240	2003 UE_{72}	—	September 21, 2003	Kitt Peak	Spacewatch	·	2.2 km	MPC · JPL
828241	2003 UG_{72}	—	September 21, 2003	Kitt Peak	Spacewatch	·	2.7 km	MPC · JPL
828242	2003 UY_{77}	—	October 17, 2003	Kitt Peak	Spacewatch	·	830 m	MPC · JPL
828243	2003 UD_{136}	—	October 21, 2003	Palomar	NEAT	THB	1.8 km	MPC · JPL
828244	2003 UM_{207}	—	October 22, 2003	Socorro	LINEAR	·	1.5 km	MPC · JPL
828245	2003 UN_{233}	—	October 24, 2003	Kitt Peak	Spacewatch	·	2.1 km	MPC · JPL
828246	2003 UZ_{274}	—	September 28, 2003	Kitt Peak	Spacewatch	ERI	1.3 km	MPC · JPL
828247	2003 UG_{283}	—	November 1, 2003	Socorro	LINEAR	·	500 m	MPC · JPL
828248	2003 UB_{289}	—	October 24, 2003	Kitt Peak	Spacewatch	·	810 m	MPC · JPL
828249	2003 UA_{302}	—	October 17, 2003	Kitt Peak	Spacewatch	·	730 m	MPC · JPL
828250	2003 UH_{306}	—	October 18, 2003	Kitt Peak	Spacewatch	·	880 m	MPC · JPL
828251	2003 UB_{322}	—	October 16, 2003	Kitt Peak	Spacewatch	·	610 m	MPC · JPL
828252	2003 UK_{324}	—	October 17, 2003	Sacramento Peak	SDSS	·	1.2 km	MPC · JPL
828253	2003 UB_{328}	—	October 17, 2003	Sacramento Peak	SDSS	·	980 m	MPC · JPL
828254	2003 UD_{333}	—	September 20, 2003	Kitt Peak	Spacewatch	·	650 m	MPC · JPL
828255	2003 UV_{336}	—	September 29, 2003	Kitt Peak	Spacewatch	·	2.1 km	MPC · JPL
828256	2003 UU_{337}	—	September 29, 2003	Kitt Peak	Spacewatch	·	1.8 km	MPC · JPL
828257	2003 UW_{342}	—	October 19, 2003	Sacramento Peak	SDSS	·	1.1 km	MPC · JPL
828258	2003 UX_{345}	—	October 19, 2003	Sacramento Peak	SDSS	·	1.4 km	MPC · JPL
828259	2003 UG_{347}	—	September 27, 2003	Kitt Peak	Spacewatch	·	1.8 km	MPC · JPL
828260	2003 UN_{348}	—	October 19, 2003	Sacramento Peak	SDSS	·	2.0 km	MPC · JPL
828261	2003 UR_{349}	—	October 19, 2003	Sacramento Peak	SDSS	H	370 m	MPC · JPL
828262	2003 UY_{350}	—	October 19, 2003	Sacramento Peak	SDSS	NYS	650 m	MPC · JPL
828263	2003 UR_{351}	—	October 19, 2003	Sacramento Peak	SDSS	·	1.3 km	MPC · JPL
828264	2003 US_{351}	—	October 19, 2003	Sacramento Peak	SDSS	·	1.2 km	MPC · JPL
828265	2003 UK_{352}	—	October 19, 2003	Sacramento Peak	SDSS	·	2.3 km	MPC · JPL
828266	2003 UY_{352}	—	October 19, 2003	Sacramento Peak	SDSS	·	1.2 km	MPC · JPL
828267	2003 UW_{353}	—	October 19, 2003	Sacramento Peak	SDSS	·	1 km	MPC · JPL
828268	2003 UC_{355}	—	October 19, 2003	Sacramento Peak	SDSS	·	1.3 km	MPC · JPL
828269	2003 UW_{361}	—	October 20, 2003	Kitt Peak	Spacewatch	MAR	920 m	MPC · JPL
828270	2003 UQ_{362}	—	October 20, 2003	Kitt Peak	Spacewatch	·	2.4 km	MPC · JPL
828271	2003 UF_{365}	—	October 20, 2003	Kitt Peak	Spacewatch	MRX	620 m	MPC · JPL
828272	2003 UB_{366}	—	October 20, 2003	Kitt Peak	Spacewatch	·	3.2 km	MPC · JPL
828273	2003 UG_{371}	—	July 30, 2003	Campo Imperatore	CINEOS	·	1.9 km	MPC · JPL
828274	2003 UP_{373}	—	September 27, 2003	Kitt Peak	Spacewatch	·	430 m	MPC · JPL
828275	2003 UQ_{373}	—	September 18, 2003	Anderson Mesa	LONEOS	·	2.2 km	MPC · JPL
828276	2003 UE_{374}	—	September 19, 2003	Kitt Peak	Spacewatch	·	1.4 km	MPC · JPL
828277	2003 UN_{374}	—	October 22, 2003	Sacramento Peak	SDSS	·	2.4 km	MPC · JPL
828278	2003 UT_{375}	—	September 29, 2003	Kitt Peak	Spacewatch	·	240 m	MPC · JPL
828279	2003 UQ_{377}	—	October 22, 2003	Sacramento Peak	SDSS	·	1.0 km	MPC · JPL
828280	2003 UZ_{379}	—	October 22, 2003	Sacramento Peak	SDSS	·	2.4 km	MPC · JPL
828281	2003 UM_{384}	—	October 22, 2003	Sacramento Peak	SDSS	·	1.4 km	MPC · JPL
828282	2003 UV_{385}	—	October 22, 2003	Sacramento Peak	SDSS	·	1.4 km	MPC · JPL
828283	2003 UL_{386}	—	October 22, 2003	Sacramento Peak	SDSS	·	1.2 km	MPC · JPL
828284	2003 UP_{387}	—	October 22, 2003	Sacramento Peak	SDSS	·	1.2 km	MPC · JPL
828285	2003 UX_{387}	—	September 22, 2003	Kitt Peak	Spacewatch	·	930 m	MPC · JPL
828286	2003 UG_{389}	—	October 22, 2003	Sacramento Peak	SDSS	PAD	1.1 km	MPC · JPL
828287	2003 UL_{390}	—	October 22, 2003	Sacramento Peak	SDSS	·	540 m	MPC · JPL
828288	2003 UZ_{390}	—	October 22, 2003	Sacramento Peak	SDSS	·	2.1 km	MPC · JPL
828289	2003 UT_{392}	—	October 22, 2003	Sacramento Peak	SDSS	VER	1.9 km	MPC · JPL
828290	2003 UX_{393}	—	October 22, 2003	Sacramento Peak	SDSS	·	550 m	MPC · JPL
828291	2003 UD_{397}	—	October 22, 2003	Sacramento Peak	SDSS	EUN	840 m	MPC · JPL
828292	2003 UM_{397}	—	October 22, 2003	Sacramento Peak	SDSS	ADE	1.3 km	MPC · JPL
828293	2003 UM_{401}	—	October 23, 2003	Sacramento Peak	SDSS	·	890 m	MPC · JPL
828294	2003 UX_{401}	—	September 18, 2003	Kitt Peak	Spacewatch	·	1.6 km	MPC · JPL
828295	2003 UG_{403}	—	September 27, 2003	Kitt Peak	Spacewatch	·	2.8 km	MPC · JPL
828296	2003 UL_{404}	—	October 23, 2003	Sacramento Peak	SDSS	·	1.3 km	MPC · JPL
828297	2003 UE_{407}	—	October 23, 2003	Sacramento Peak	SDSS	LIX	2.2 km	MPC · JPL
828298	2003 UN_{416}	—	September 27, 2003	Kitt Peak	Spacewatch	EOS	1.4 km	MPC · JPL
828299	2003 UC_{418}	—	September 21, 2003	Kitt Peak	Spacewatch	·	440 m	MPC · JPL
828300	2003 UB_{425}	—	October 19, 2003	Kitt Peak	Spacewatch	NYS	580 m	MPC · JPL

== 828301–828400 ==
back to top

Designation			Discovery			Properties		Ref
Permanent	Provisional	Named after	Date	Site	Discoverer(s)	Category	Diam.	Ref
828301	2003 UM_{427}	—	March 17, 2010	WISE	WISE	·	2.6 km	MPC · JPL
828302	2003 UT_{430}	—	October 16, 2003	Kitt Peak	Spacewatch	·	1.3 km	MPC · JPL
828303	2003 UW_{434}	—	February 7, 2018	Mount Lemmon	Mount Lemmon Survey	H	430 m	MPC · JPL
828304	2003 US_{437}	—	October 8, 2012	Haleakala	Pan-STARRS 1	·	1.4 km	MPC · JPL
828305	2003 UT_{443}	—	October 24, 2009	Kitt Peak	Spacewatch	·	2.1 km	MPC · JPL
828306	2003 UH_{444}	—	October 23, 2003	Kitt Peak	Spacewatch	AEO	580 m	MPC · JPL
828307	2003 UP_{445}	—	October 19, 2003	Kitt Peak	Spacewatch	·	1.8 km	MPC · JPL
828308	2003 UC_{446}	—	October 23, 2003	Kitt Peak	Spacewatch	URS	2.2 km	MPC · JPL
828309	2003 UK_{448}	—	October 29, 2003	Kitt Peak	Spacewatch	3:2	3.5 km	MPC · JPL
828310	2003 UL_{449}	—	October 24, 2003	Sacramento Peak	SDSS	·	1.1 km	MPC · JPL
828311	2003 UQ_{449}	—	October 18, 2003	Kitt Peak	Spacewatch	·	980 m	MPC · JPL
828312	2003 UJ_{451}	—	October 19, 2003	Kitt Peak	Spacewatch	(5)	730 m	MPC · JPL
828313	2003 VW_{12}	—	April 8, 2015	Haleakala	Pan-STARRS 1	H	380 m	MPC · JPL
828314	2003 VY_{12}	—	September 21, 2008	Kitt Peak	Spacewatch	H	400 m	MPC · JPL
828315	2003 VC_{13}	—	October 27, 2013	Haleakala	Pan-STARRS 1	·	760 m	MPC · JPL
828316	2003 WJ_{14}	—	November 16, 2003	Kitt Peak	Spacewatch	·	2.0 km	MPC · JPL
828317	2003 WK_{15}	—	October 19, 2003	Kitt Peak	Spacewatch	·	470 m	MPC · JPL
828318	2003 WU_{17}	—	November 18, 2003	Kitt Peak	Spacewatch	·	580 m	MPC · JPL
828319	2003 WJ_{43}	—	October 21, 2003	Kitt Peak	Spacewatch	·	2.0 km	MPC · JPL
828320	2003 WO_{52}	—	October 28, 2003	Socorro	LINEAR	·	3.6 km	MPC · JPL
828321	2003 WG_{62}	—	October 23, 2003	Kitt Peak	Spacewatch	·	2.4 km	MPC · JPL
828322	2003 WT_{128}	—	November 14, 2003	Palomar	NEAT	TIR	2.3 km	MPC · JPL
828323	2003 WX_{159}	—	November 30, 2003	Kitt Peak	Spacewatch	·	680 m	MPC · JPL
828324	2003 WN_{174}	—	November 19, 2003	Kitt Peak	Spacewatch	·	870 m	MPC · JPL
828325	2003 WD_{178}	—	September 30, 2003	Kitt Peak	Spacewatch	·	980 m	MPC · JPL
828326	2003 WG_{179}	—	November 21, 2003	Kitt Peak	Spacewatch	·	940 m	MPC · JPL
828327	2003 WJ_{185}	—	November 21, 2003	Kitt Peak	Deep Ecliptic Survey	·	590 m	MPC · JPL
828328	2003 WE_{202}	—	February 19, 2014	Kitt Peak	Spacewatch	·	1.5 km	MPC · JPL
828329	2003 WK_{202}	—	September 28, 2006	Kitt Peak	Spacewatch	·	580 m	MPC · JPL
828330	2003 WT_{203}	—	May 8, 2010	WISE	WISE	·	1.8 km	MPC · JPL
828331	2003 WC_{204}	—	November 14, 2012	Kitt Peak	Spacewatch	·	1.4 km	MPC · JPL
828332	2003 WM_{204}	—	July 20, 2010	WISE	WISE	·	740 m	MPC · JPL
828333	2003 WT_{208}	—	September 25, 2012	Mount Lemmon	Mount Lemmon Survey	MRX	790 m	MPC · JPL
828334	2003 WM_{209}	—	September 21, 2008	Mount Lemmon	Mount Lemmon Survey	·	2.0 km	MPC · JPL
828335	2003 WC_{212}	—	January 7, 2016	Haleakala	Pan-STARRS 1	·	2.3 km	MPC · JPL
828336	2003 WF_{212}	—	November 17, 2009	Kitt Peak	Spacewatch	URS	2.9 km	MPC · JPL
828337	2003 WN_{212}	—	February 7, 2008	Mount Lemmon	Mount Lemmon Survey	MAS	490 m	MPC · JPL
828338	2003 WE_{215}	—	November 20, 2003	Sacramento Peak	SDSS	·	550 m	MPC · JPL
828339	2003 WX_{215}	—	November 19, 2003	Kitt Peak	Spacewatch	·	1.5 km	MPC · JPL
828340	2003 WS_{216}	—	November 21, 2003	Kitt Peak	Spacewatch	·	2.1 km	MPC · JPL
828341	2003 XK_{1}	—	December 1, 2003	Kitt Peak	Spacewatch	·	2.5 km	MPC · JPL
828342	2003 XQ_{1}	—	December 1, 2003	Kitt Peak	Spacewatch	URS	2.1 km	MPC · JPL
828343	2003 XU_{17}	—	December 15, 2003	Kitt Peak	Spacewatch	·	690 m	MPC · JPL
828344	2003 XU_{24}	—	December 1, 2003	Kitt Peak	Spacewatch	T_{j} (2.98) · EUP	2.8 km	MPC · JPL
828345	2003 XD_{30}	—	November 19, 2003	Kitt Peak	Spacewatch	·	1.0 km	MPC · JPL
828346	2003 XE_{45}	—	August 27, 2016	Haleakala	Pan-STARRS 1	·	1.2 km	MPC · JPL
828347	2003 XK_{45}	—	October 1, 2014	Haleakala	Pan-STARRS 1	VER	2.1 km	MPC · JPL
828348	2003 YM	—	December 17, 2003	Socorro	LINEAR	·	1.6 km	MPC · JPL
828349	2003 YD_{30}	—	November 24, 2003	Anderson Mesa	LONEOS	H	550 m	MPC · JPL
828350	2003 YK_{67}	—	December 17, 2003	Anderson Mesa	LONEOS	T_{j} (2.97)	3.0 km	MPC · JPL
828351	2003 YS_{73}	—	November 26, 2003	Socorro	LINEAR	·	2.5 km	MPC · JPL
828352	2003 YJ_{112}	—	December 23, 2003	Socorro	LINEAR	·	3.4 km	MPC · JPL
828353	2003 YY_{176}	—	December 16, 2003	Mauna Kea	D. D. Balam	AGN	700 m	MPC · JPL
828354	2003 YD_{185}	—	December 21, 2014	Mount Lemmon	Mount Lemmon Survey	·	820 m	MPC · JPL
828355	2003 YO_{185}	—	September 10, 2007	Kitt Peak	Spacewatch	·	1.4 km	MPC · JPL
828356	2003 YH_{186}	—	January 7, 2010	Kitt Peak	Spacewatch	·	2.2 km	MPC · JPL
828357	2003 YJ_{186}	—	May 2, 2010	WISE	WISE	·	2.6 km	MPC · JPL
828358	2003 YK_{186}	—	February 18, 2004	Kitt Peak	Spacewatch	PHO	670 m	MPC · JPL
828359	2003 YM_{188}	—	November 15, 2007	Mount Lemmon	Mount Lemmon Survey	(5)	630 m	MPC · JPL
828360	2003 YM_{190}	—	December 18, 2003	Kitt Peak	Spacewatch	·	1.2 km	MPC · JPL
828361	2003 YR_{190}	—	September 26, 2017	Mount Lemmon	Mount Lemmon Survey	·	640 m	MPC · JPL
828362	2004 AX_{3}	—	January 13, 2004	Anderson Mesa	LONEOS	·	880 m	MPC · JPL
828363	2004 AF_{27}	—	January 15, 2004	Kitt Peak	Spacewatch	·	420 m	MPC · JPL
828364	2004 BQ_{4}	—	December 28, 2003	Kitt Peak	Spacewatch	·	1.9 km	MPC · JPL
828365	2004 BQ_{40}	—	January 21, 2004	Socorro	LINEAR	·	1.2 km	MPC · JPL
828366	2004 BH_{64}	—	January 16, 2004	Kitt Peak	Spacewatch	·	1.9 km	MPC · JPL
828367	2004 BP_{112}	—	December 21, 2003	Kitt Peak	Spacewatch	·	1.5 km	MPC · JPL
828368	2004 BQ_{123}	—	January 30, 2004	Mauna Kea	Allen, R. L.	·	1.1 km	MPC · JPL
828369	2004 BZ_{135}	—	January 19, 2004	Kitt Peak	Spacewatch	·	1.6 km	MPC · JPL
828370	2004 BY_{137}	—	January 19, 2004	Kitt Peak	Spacewatch	·	580 m	MPC · JPL
828371	2004 BD_{159}	—	January 20, 2004	Cerro Paranal	E. Tedesco, M. Granvik	·	1.7 km	MPC · JPL
828372	2004 BS_{159}	—	March 15, 2004	Kitt Peak	Spacewatch	·	2.2 km	MPC · JPL
828373	2004 BU_{159}	—	January 30, 2004	Mauna Kea	Allen, R. L.	·	1.2 km	MPC · JPL
828374	2004 BW_{159}	—	January 30, 2004	Mauna Kea	Allen, R. L.	AGN	790 m	MPC · JPL
828375	2004 BM_{160}	—	March 17, 2004	Kitt Peak	Spacewatch	·	1.7 km	MPC · JPL
828376	2004 BG_{166}	—	November 6, 2010	Mount Lemmon	Mount Lemmon Survey	·	590 m	MPC · JPL
828377	2004 BW_{166}	—	September 29, 2008	Mount Lemmon	Mount Lemmon Survey	·	3.0 km	MPC · JPL
828378	2004 BD_{167}	—	January 31, 2004	Sacramento Peak	SDSS	·	1.2 km	MPC · JPL
828379	2004 BK_{167}	—	January 31, 2004	Sacramento Peak	SDSS	·	1.3 km	MPC · JPL
828380	2004 BB_{168}	—	January 30, 2004	Kitt Peak	Spacewatch	·	1.4 km	MPC · JPL
828381	2004 BB_{171}	—	June 24, 2017	Haleakala	Pan-STARRS 1	·	2.1 km	MPC · JPL
828382	2004 BV_{171}	—	January 12, 2011	Kitt Peak	Spacewatch	·	430 m	MPC · JPL
828383	2004 BK_{174}	—	January 30, 2004	Kitt Peak	Spacewatch	·	1.6 km	MPC · JPL
828384	2004 CY_{14}	—	February 11, 2004	Kitt Peak	Spacewatch	·	480 m	MPC · JPL
828385	2004 CC_{17}	—	February 11, 2004	Kitt Peak	Spacewatch	·	1.4 km	MPC · JPL
828386	2004 CZ_{20}	—	February 11, 2004	Kitt Peak	Spacewatch	·	1.0 km	MPC · JPL
828387	2004 CJ_{23}	—	January 28, 2004	Kitt Peak	Spacewatch	·	770 m	MPC · JPL
828388	2004 CH_{34}	—	January 17, 2004	Haleakala	NEAT	·	900 m	MPC · JPL
828389	2004 CR_{88}	—	February 11, 2004	Kitt Peak	Spacewatch	·	1.3 km	MPC · JPL
828390	2004 CT_{110}	—	February 11, 2004	Kitt Peak	D. E. Trilling, A. S. Rivkin	H	440 m	MPC · JPL
828391	2004 CU_{133}	—	May 18, 2010	WISE	WISE	·	2.8 km	MPC · JPL
828392	2004 CT_{134}	—	September 24, 2011	Haleakala	Pan-STARRS 1	·	810 m	MPC · JPL
828393	2004 CJ_{135}	—	June 2, 2010	WISE	WISE	·	2.7 km	MPC · JPL
828394	2004 DZ_{24}	—	February 17, 2004	Kitt Peak	Spacewatch	H	450 m	MPC · JPL
828395	2004 DP_{83}	—	January 28, 2015	Haleakala	Pan-STARRS 1	·	700 m	MPC · JPL
828396	2004 DD_{86}	—	November 17, 2014	Haleakala	Pan-STARRS 1	·	2.4 km	MPC · JPL
828397	2004 DR_{86}	—	May 27, 2014	Haleakala	Pan-STARRS 1	·	1.8 km	MPC · JPL
828398	2004 FZ_{6}	—	March 16, 2004	Kitt Peak	Spacewatch	·	1.5 km	MPC · JPL
828399	2004 FF_{29}	—	March 28, 2004	Črni Vrh	Mikuž, H.	APO +1km	850 m	MPC · JPL
828400	2004 FR_{68}	—	March 16, 2004	Kitt Peak	Spacewatch	EUP	2.1 km	MPC · JPL

== 828401–828500 ==
back to top

Designation			Discovery			Properties		Ref
Permanent	Provisional	Named after	Date	Site	Discoverer(s)	Category	Diam.	Ref
828401	2004 FD_{78}	—	March 19, 2004	Kitt Peak	Spacewatch	·	1.2 km	MPC · JPL
828402	2004 FN_{80}	—	March 15, 2004	Kitt Peak	Spacewatch	·	1.4 km	MPC · JPL
828403	2004 FJ_{151}	—	March 16, 2004	Kitt Peak	Spacewatch	NYS	820 m	MPC · JPL
828404	2004 FX_{168}	—	January 29, 2015	Haleakala	Pan-STARRS 1	·	900 m	MPC · JPL
828405	2004 FL_{169}	—	March 18, 2004	Kitt Peak	Spacewatch	·	560 m	MPC · JPL
828406	2004 FO_{169}	—	January 11, 2011	Mount Lemmon	Mount Lemmon Survey	·	870 m	MPC · JPL
828407	2004 FU_{171}	—	August 13, 2013	Kitt Peak	Spacewatch	·	640 m	MPC · JPL
828408	2004 FH_{172}	—	February 13, 2011	Mount Lemmon	Mount Lemmon Survey	·	490 m	MPC · JPL
828409	2004 FA_{174}	—	October 11, 2015	Mount Lemmon	Mount Lemmon Survey	·	970 m	MPC · JPL
828410	2004 FC_{174}	—	March 16, 2004	Kitt Peak	Spacewatch	·	1.1 km	MPC · JPL
828411	2004 FN_{174}	—	March 21, 1999	Sacramento Peak	SDSS	·	1.6 km	MPC · JPL
828412	2004 FA_{175}	—	August 12, 2013	Haleakala	Pan-STARRS 1	·	830 m	MPC · JPL
828413	2004 FA_{176}	—	May 19, 2015	Mount Lemmon	Mount Lemmon Survey	·	700 m	MPC · JPL
828414	2004 GB_{4}	—	April 11, 2004	Palomar	NEAT	·	1.9 km	MPC · JPL
828415	2004 GD_{62}	—	March 23, 2004	Kitt Peak	Spacewatch	·	810 m	MPC · JPL
828416	2004 GZ_{75}	—	April 15, 2004	Kitt Peak	Spacewatch	·	2.8 km	MPC · JPL
828417	2004 GM_{78}	—	April 11, 2004	Palomar	NEAT	·	2.2 km	MPC · JPL
828418	2004 GP_{82}	—	March 29, 2004	Kitt Peak	Spacewatch	·	730 m	MPC · JPL
828419	2004 GY_{89}	—	February 13, 2011	Mount Lemmon	Mount Lemmon Survey	MAS	470 m	MPC · JPL
828420	2004 GT_{90}	—	March 12, 2010	WISE	WISE	·	2.2 km	MPC · JPL
828421	2004 GF_{91}	—	August 14, 2012	Haleakala	Pan-STARRS 1	NYS	590 m	MPC · JPL
828422	2004 HM_{14}	—	April 16, 2004	Kitt Peak	Spacewatch	·	3.0 km	MPC · JPL
828423	2004 HF_{29}	—	April 21, 2004	Kitt Peak	Spacewatch	·	870 m	MPC · JPL
828424	2004 HL_{32}	—	April 20, 2004	Kitt Peak	Spacewatch	·	2.8 km	MPC · JPL
828425	2004 HY_{76}	—	April 26, 2004	Mauna Kea	P. A. Wiegert, D. D. Balam	·	1.3 km	MPC · JPL
828426	2004 HQ_{81}	—	April 16, 2004	Sacramento Peak	SDSS	BAR	1.0 km	MPC · JPL
828427	2004 HQ_{82}	—	May 9, 2014	Haleakala	Pan-STARRS 1	·	420 m	MPC · JPL
828428	2004 HD_{85}	—	January 14, 2016	Haleakala	Pan-STARRS 1	·	750 m	MPC · JPL
828429	2004 HQ_{85}	—	October 17, 2009	Mount Lemmon	Mount Lemmon Survey	·	780 m	MPC · JPL
828430	2004 HW_{85}	—	April 22, 2004	Kitt Peak	Spacewatch	·	3.8 km	MPC · JPL
828431	2004 HY_{85}	—	April 22, 2004	Kitt Peak	Spacewatch	·	490 m	MPC · JPL
828432	2004 JW_{40}	—	May 14, 2004	Kitt Peak	Spacewatch	·	1.6 km	MPC · JPL
828433	2004 JR_{49}	—	May 13, 2004	Kitt Peak	Spacewatch	·	690 m	MPC · JPL
828434	2004 JL_{53}	—	May 9, 2004	Kitt Peak	Spacewatch	·	1.0 km	MPC · JPL
828435	2004 JP_{58}	—	May 12, 2004	Sacramento Peak	SDSS	EUP	2.6 km	MPC · JPL
828436	2004 KB_{21}	—	May 23, 2004	Sacramento Peak	SDSS	·	2.1 km	MPC · JPL
828437	2004 KT_{21}	—	May 27, 2004	Kitt Peak	Spacewatch	·	880 m	MPC · JPL
828438	2004 KP_{22}	—	May 19, 2004	Kitt Peak	Spacewatch	TIR	2.3 km	MPC · JPL
828439	2004 LC_{14}	—	June 11, 2004	Kitt Peak	Spacewatch	·	990 m	MPC · JPL
828440	2004 LZ_{30}	—	June 15, 2004	Kitt Peak	Spacewatch	T_{j} (2.98) · EUP	2.9 km	MPC · JPL
828441	2004 MK_{5}	—	June 19, 2004	Kitt Peak	Spacewatch	·	760 m	MPC · JPL
828442	2004 MM_{9}	—	August 14, 2013	Haleakala	Pan-STARRS 1	(5)	980 m	MPC · JPL
828443	2004 NM_{30}	—	July 15, 2004	Siding Spring	R. H. McNaught	·	780 m	MPC · JPL
828444	2004 ND_{34}	—	March 29, 2016	Haleakala	Pan-STARRS 1	·	1.0 km	MPC · JPL
828445	2004 OY_{15}	—	July 16, 2004	Siding Spring	SSS	·	1.3 km	MPC · JPL
828446	2004 OT_{16}	—	November 19, 2015	Mount Lemmon	Mount Lemmon Survey	·	540 m	MPC · JPL
828447	2004 OX_{16}	—	September 4, 2008	Kitt Peak	Spacewatch	·	660 m	MPC · JPL
828448	2004 OZ_{16}	—	August 6, 2010	WISE	WISE	·	2.2 km	MPC · JPL
828449	2004 OL_{17}	—	July 18, 2004	Siding Spring	SSS	T_{j} (2.95)	3.2 km	MPC · JPL
828450	2004 OP_{17}	—	July 17, 2004	Cerro Tololo	Deep Ecliptic Survey	·	610 m	MPC · JPL
828451	2004 PC_{2}	—	August 3, 2004	Siding Spring	SSS	·	810 m	MPC · JPL
828452	2004 PX_{8}	—	August 6, 2004	Palomar	NEAT	·	1.2 km	MPC · JPL
828453	2004 PU_{109}	—	August 12, 2004	Cerro Tololo	Deep Ecliptic Survey	·	2.1 km	MPC · JPL
828454	2004 PS_{113}	—	August 11, 2004	Socorro	LINEAR	·	1.1 km	MPC · JPL
828455	2004 PT_{118}	—	August 14, 2004	Palomar	NEAT	·	1.3 km	MPC · JPL
828456	2004 PR_{119}	—	August 20, 2004	Kitt Peak	Spacewatch	·	660 m	MPC · JPL
828457	2004 PC_{120}	—	August 15, 2004	Cerro Tololo	Deep Ecliptic Survey	·	860 m	MPC · JPL
828458	2004 PF_{121}	—	August 9, 2004	Siding Spring	SSS	THB	2.7 km	MPC · JPL
828459	2004 PJ_{121}	—	September 23, 2011	Haleakala	Pan-STARRS 1	·	420 m	MPC · JPL
828460	2004 PG_{122}	—	September 17, 2017	Haleakala	Pan-STARRS 1	·	930 m	MPC · JPL
828461	2004 QD_{1}	—	August 19, 2004	Socorro	LINEAR	·	1.6 km	MPC · JPL
828462	2004 QV_{5}	—	August 20, 2004	Kitt Peak	Spacewatch	·	1.8 km	MPC · JPL
828463	2004 QR_{6}	—	August 22, 2004	Kitt Peak	Spacewatch	·	1.0 km	MPC · JPL
828464	2004 QF_{20}	—	August 26, 2004	Socorro	LINEAR	·	1.2 km	MPC · JPL
828465	2004 QG_{20}	—	August 26, 2004	Catalina	CSS	AMO	450 m	MPC · JPL
828466	2004 QB_{28}	—	August 25, 2004	Kitt Peak	Spacewatch	·	790 m	MPC · JPL
828467	2004 QU_{30}	—	August 22, 2004	Kitt Peak	Spacewatch	·	530 m	MPC · JPL
828468	2004 QK_{34}	—	September 19, 2014	Haleakala	Pan-STARRS 1	·	1.2 km	MPC · JPL
828469	2004 QN_{34}	—	February 11, 2015	Mount Lemmon	Mount Lemmon Survey	HNS	730 m	MPC · JPL
828470	2004 QB_{35}	—	August 27, 2009	Kitt Peak	Spacewatch	H	330 m	MPC · JPL
828471	2004 QZ_{36}	—	August 25, 2004	Kitt Peak	Spacewatch	·	480 m	MPC · JPL
828472	2004 QD_{37}	—	August 25, 2004	Kitt Peak	Spacewatch	·	1.6 km	MPC · JPL
828473	2004 QF_{38}	—	August 22, 2004	Kitt Peak	Spacewatch	·	810 m	MPC · JPL
828474	2004 QW_{38}	—	August 22, 2004	Kitt Peak	Spacewatch	·	1.2 km	MPC · JPL
828475	2004 RH_{9}	—	September 6, 2004	Socorro	LINEAR	·	1.7 km	MPC · JPL
828476	2004 RW_{11}	—	August 26, 2004	Catalina	CSS	·	2.4 km	MPC · JPL
828477	2004 RC_{22}	—	August 10, 2004	Campo Imperatore	CINEOS	·	550 m	MPC · JPL
828478	2004 RO_{24}	—	September 8, 2004	Socorro	LINEAR	·	760 m	MPC · JPL
828479	2004 RW_{72}	—	August 11, 2004	Socorro	LINEAR	(1547)	1.2 km	MPC · JPL
828480	2004 RR_{85}	—	September 4, 2004	Palomar	NEAT	·	620 m	MPC · JPL
828481	2004 RK_{98}	—	August 25, 2004	Kitt Peak	Spacewatch	(5)	970 m	MPC · JPL
828482	2004 RX_{102}	—	September 8, 2004	Socorro	LINEAR	·	1.1 km	MPC · JPL
828483	2004 RT_{128}	—	September 7, 2004	Kitt Peak	Spacewatch	·	1.3 km	MPC · JPL
828484	2004 RE_{134}	—	September 7, 2004	Kitt Peak	Spacewatch	T_{j} (2.99)	3.0 km	MPC · JPL
828485	2004 RV_{162}	—	August 23, 2004	Kitt Peak	Spacewatch	·	770 m	MPC · JPL
828486	2004 RY_{163}	—	September 10, 2004	Socorro	LINEAR	EUN	1.0 km	MPC · JPL
828487	2004 RL_{187}	—	September 10, 2004	Socorro	LINEAR	·	1.1 km	MPC · JPL
828488	2004 RN_{199}	—	August 13, 2004	Cerro Tololo	Deep Ecliptic Survey	·	920 m	MPC · JPL
828489	2004 RP_{199}	—	September 10, 2004	Kitt Peak	Spacewatch	·	780 m	MPC · JPL
828490	2004 RR_{203}	—	September 12, 2004	Kitt Peak	Spacewatch	EUN	1.0 km	MPC · JPL
828491	2004 RD_{216}	—	September 11, 2004	Socorro	LINEAR	·	2.2 km	MPC · JPL
828492	2004 RE_{222}	—	September 9, 2004	Socorro	LINEAR	·	1.6 km	MPC · JPL
828493	2004 RA_{224}	—	September 8, 2004	Socorro	LINEAR	·	1.1 km	MPC · JPL
828494	2004 RP_{238}	—	September 10, 2004	Kitt Peak	Spacewatch	EOS	1.2 km	MPC · JPL
828495	2004 RE_{239}	—	September 10, 2004	Kitt Peak	Spacewatch	·	1.6 km	MPC · JPL
828496	2004 RP_{242}	—	September 10, 2004	Kitt Peak	Spacewatch	MAS	460 m	MPC · JPL
828497	2004 RA_{244}	—	September 10, 2004	Kitt Peak	Spacewatch	·	880 m	MPC · JPL
828498	2004 RH_{259}	—	September 10, 2004	Kitt Peak	Spacewatch	·	1.9 km	MPC · JPL
828499	2004 RQ_{271}	—	September 11, 2004	Kitt Peak	Spacewatch	·	470 m	MPC · JPL
828500	2004 RU_{273}	—	September 11, 2004	Kitt Peak	Spacewatch	·	620 m	MPC · JPL

== 828501–828600 ==
back to top

Designation			Discovery			Properties		Ref
Permanent	Provisional	Named after	Date	Site	Discoverer(s)	Category	Diam.	Ref
828501	2004 RX_{276}	—	September 13, 2004	Kitt Peak	Spacewatch	·	900 m	MPC · JPL
828502	2004 RX_{283}	—	September 15, 2004	Kitt Peak	Spacewatch	·	1.8 km	MPC · JPL
828503	2004 RE_{285}	—	September 15, 2004	Kitt Peak	Spacewatch	·	1.4 km	MPC · JPL
828504	2004 RG_{302}	—	September 11, 2004	Kitt Peak	Spacewatch	·	630 m	MPC · JPL
828505	2004 RC_{305}	—	September 12, 2004	Kitt Peak	Spacewatch	·	2.0 km	MPC · JPL
828506	2004 RW_{317}	—	September 10, 2004	Socorro	LINEAR	H	410 m	MPC · JPL
828507	2004 RX_{328}	—	September 13, 2004	Socorro	LINEAR	·	1.0 km	MPC · JPL
828508	2004 RZ_{330}	—	September 15, 2004	Kitt Peak	Spacewatch	·	630 m	MPC · JPL
828509	2004 RE_{343}	—	July 20, 2004	Siding Spring	SSS	·	1.1 km	MPC · JPL
828510	2004 RA_{349}	—	September 12, 2004	Mauna Kea	P. A. Wiegert, S. Popa	·	1.6 km	MPC · JPL
828511	2004 RX_{353}	—	September 11, 2004	Kitt Peak	Spacewatch	VER	2.5 km	MPC · JPL
828512	2004 RM_{354}	—	September 11, 2004	Kitt Peak	Spacewatch	·	800 m	MPC · JPL
828513	2004 RR_{359}	—	November 10, 2013	Mount Lemmon	Mount Lemmon Survey	·	1.2 km	MPC · JPL
828514	2004 RC_{360}	—	September 7, 2004	Kitt Peak	Spacewatch	H	390 m	MPC · JPL
828515	2004 RA_{361}	—	September 11, 2004	Kitt Peak	Spacewatch	(5)	930 m	MPC · JPL
828516	2004 RL_{362}	—	September 13, 2004	Kitt Peak	Spacewatch	·	510 m	MPC · JPL
828517	2004 RF_{364}	—	September 11, 2004	Kitt Peak	Spacewatch	·	350 m	MPC · JPL
828518	2004 RU_{365}	—	October 24, 2013	Mount Lemmon	Mount Lemmon Survey	·	970 m	MPC · JPL
828519	2004 RT_{366}	—	September 12, 2004	Kitt Peak	Spacewatch	·	400 m	MPC · JPL
828520	2004 SE_{4}	—	September 17, 2004	Kitt Peak	Spacewatch	·	670 m	MPC · JPL
828521	2004 SV_{6}	—	September 17, 2004	Kitt Peak	Spacewatch	EUN	820 m	MPC · JPL
828522	2004 SK_{7}	—	September 17, 2004	Kitt Peak	Spacewatch	·	910 m	MPC · JPL
828523	2004 SZ_{8}	—	September 8, 2004	Palomar	NEAT	·	1.3 km	MPC · JPL
828524	2004 SN_{13}	—	September 17, 2004	Socorro	LINEAR	·	1.0 km	MPC · JPL
828525	2004 SF_{27}	—	September 16, 2004	Kitt Peak	Spacewatch	·	1.3 km	MPC · JPL
828526	2004 SV_{27}	—	September 16, 2004	Kitt Peak	Spacewatch	·	2.1 km	MPC · JPL
828527	2004 SN_{35}	—	August 23, 2004	Kitt Peak	Spacewatch	·	1.9 km	MPC · JPL
828528	2004 SB_{37}	—	August 25, 2004	Kitt Peak	Spacewatch	·	860 m	MPC · JPL
828529	2004 SN_{64}	—	November 27, 2013	Haleakala	Pan-STARRS 1	·	900 m	MPC · JPL
828530	2004 SP_{65}	—	August 25, 2014	Haleakala	Pan-STARRS 1	·	520 m	MPC · JPL
828531	2004 TY_{5}	—	October 5, 2004	Kitt Peak	Spacewatch	·	1.2 km	MPC · JPL
828532	2004 TC_{6}	—	October 5, 2004	Kitt Peak	Spacewatch	·	1.7 km	MPC · JPL
828533	2004 TE_{9}	—	October 4, 2004	Kitt Peak	Spacewatch	PHO	830 m	MPC · JPL
828534	2004 TG_{10}	—	October 8, 2004	Kitt Peak	Spacewatch	T_{j} (2.99) · APO +1km · PHA	1.3 km	MPC · JPL
828535	2004 TQ_{21}	—	October 4, 2004	Kitt Peak	Spacewatch	·	2.2 km	MPC · JPL
828536	2004 TP_{24}	—	October 4, 2004	Kitt Peak	Spacewatch	·	820 m	MPC · JPL
828537	2004 TR_{33}	—	October 4, 2004	Kitt Peak	Spacewatch	·	1.3 km	MPC · JPL
828538	2004 TW_{40}	—	September 12, 2004	Kitt Peak	Spacewatch	·	640 m	MPC · JPL
828539	2004 TD_{63}	—	September 7, 2004	Kitt Peak	Spacewatch	·	1.2 km	MPC · JPL
828540	2004 TX_{63}	—	September 22, 2004	Kitt Peak	Spacewatch	·	920 m	MPC · JPL
828541	2004 TJ_{71}	—	September 10, 2004	Kitt Peak	Spacewatch	·	1.8 km	MPC · JPL
828542	2004 TY_{71}	—	September 9, 2004	Kitt Peak	Spacewatch	·	1.2 km	MPC · JPL
828543	2004 TU_{76}	—	October 7, 2004	Kitt Peak	Spacewatch	·	760 m	MPC · JPL
828544	2004 TZ_{76}	—	September 23, 2004	Kitt Peak	Spacewatch	·	1.8 km	MPC · JPL
828545	2004 TC_{83}	—	October 5, 2004	Kitt Peak	Spacewatch	·	1.8 km	MPC · JPL
828546	2004 TZ_{90}	—	October 5, 2004	Kitt Peak	Spacewatch	·	440 m	MPC · JPL
828547	2004 TN_{94}	—	October 5, 2004	Kitt Peak	Spacewatch	·	1.0 km	MPC · JPL
828548	2004 TR_{96}	—	October 5, 2004	Kitt Peak	Spacewatch	·	580 m	MPC · JPL
828549	2004 TS_{97}	—	October 5, 2004	Kitt Peak	Spacewatch	EUN	950 m	MPC · JPL
828550	2004 TM_{141}	—	October 4, 2004	Kitt Peak	Spacewatch	·	2.6 km	MPC · JPL
828551	2004 TE_{144}	—	October 4, 2004	Kitt Peak	Spacewatch	ERI	1.1 km	MPC · JPL
828552	2004 TJ_{149}	—	October 6, 2004	Kitt Peak	Spacewatch	·	1.0 km	MPC · JPL
828553	2004 TV_{187}	—	October 7, 2004	Kitt Peak	Spacewatch	EUN	840 m	MPC · JPL
828554	2004 TS_{197}	—	October 7, 2004	Kitt Peak	Spacewatch	·	1.1 km	MPC · JPL
828555	2004 TM_{212}	—	October 8, 2004	Kitt Peak	Spacewatch	·	500 m	MPC · JPL
828556	2004 TD_{226}	—	October 8, 2004	Kitt Peak	Spacewatch	·	1.6 km	MPC · JPL
828557	2004 TC_{234}	—	October 8, 2004	Kitt Peak	Spacewatch	·	830 m	MPC · JPL
828558	2004 TX_{237}	—	October 9, 2004	Kitt Peak	Spacewatch	·	1.1 km	MPC · JPL
828559	2004 TA_{254}	—	October 9, 2004	Kitt Peak	Spacewatch	·	760 m	MPC · JPL
828560	2004 TK_{255}	—	October 9, 2004	Kitt Peak	Spacewatch	·	980 m	MPC · JPL
828561	2004 TN_{257}	—	October 9, 2004	Kitt Peak	Spacewatch	·	1.4 km	MPC · JPL
828562	2004 TS_{258}	—	October 6, 2004	Kitt Peak	Spacewatch	KOR	990 m	MPC · JPL
828563	2004 TS_{259}	—	October 9, 2004	Kitt Peak	Spacewatch	·	1.4 km	MPC · JPL
828564	2004 TU_{262}	—	October 9, 2004	Palomar	NEAT	·	1.2 km	MPC · JPL
828565	2004 TF_{264}	—	October 9, 2004	Kitt Peak	Spacewatch	·	1.0 km	MPC · JPL
828566	2004 TV_{264}	—	October 9, 2004	Kitt Peak	Spacewatch	NYS	760 m	MPC · JPL
828567	2004 TV_{267}	—	October 9, 2004	Kitt Peak	Spacewatch	MAS	550 m	MPC · JPL
828568	2004 TG_{272}	—	October 9, 2004	Kitt Peak	Spacewatch	·	2.0 km	MPC · JPL
828569	2004 TS_{276}	—	October 9, 2004	Kitt Peak	Spacewatch	·	1.7 km	MPC · JPL
828570	2004 TY_{279}	—	October 10, 2004	Kitt Peak	Spacewatch	·	2.6 km	MPC · JPL
828571	2004 TX_{284}	—	October 8, 2004	Kitt Peak	Spacewatch	·	1.5 km	MPC · JPL
828572	2004 TB_{289}	—	September 17, 2004	Socorro	LINEAR	·	1.3 km	MPC · JPL
828573	2004 TZ_{300}	—	October 8, 2004	Kitt Peak	Spacewatch	NYS	820 m	MPC · JPL
828574	2004 TL_{321}	—	October 11, 2004	Kitt Peak	Spacewatch	·	1.0 km	MPC · JPL
828575	2004 TK_{326}	—	October 14, 2004	Palomar	NEAT	·	1.2 km	MPC · JPL
828576	2004 TN_{338}	—	October 12, 2004	Kitt Peak	Spacewatch	·	1.3 km	MPC · JPL
828577	2004 TO_{347}	—	October 12, 2004	Moletai	K. Černis, Zdanavicius, J.	critical	1.1 km	MPC · JPL
828578	2004 TN_{370}	—	October 15, 2004	Kitt Peak	Spacewatch	(5)	1.0 km	MPC · JPL
828579	2004 TD_{375}	—	February 15, 2010	Catalina	CSS	·	1.8 km	MPC · JPL
828580	2004 TL_{376}	—	March 21, 2010	WISE	WISE	·	1.3 km	MPC · JPL
828581	2004 TN_{376}	—	September 24, 2008	Kitt Peak	Spacewatch	·	860 m	MPC · JPL
828582	2004 TQ_{377}	—	October 27, 2008	Kitt Peak	Spacewatch	·	820 m	MPC · JPL
828583	2004 TL_{378}	—	October 5, 2004	Palomar	NEAT	·	1.2 km	MPC · JPL
828584	2004 TM_{378}	—	October 15, 2004	Kitt Peak	Deep Ecliptic Survey	·	930 m	MPC · JPL
828585	2004 TN_{378}	—	November 4, 2004	Kitt Peak	Spacewatch	·	1.7 km	MPC · JPL
828586	2004 TA_{380}	—	July 28, 2015	Haleakala	Pan-STARRS 1	·	850 m	MPC · JPL
828587	2004 TW_{380}	—	September 27, 2009	Kitt Peak	Spacewatch	·	1.4 km	MPC · JPL
828588	2004 TE_{381}	—	May 8, 2010	WISE	WISE	·	1.3 km	MPC · JPL
828589	2004 TS_{381}	—	October 3, 2013	Haleakala	Pan-STARRS 1	·	1.1 km	MPC · JPL
828590	2004 TD_{383}	—	August 28, 2014	Haleakala	Pan-STARRS 1	·	470 m	MPC · JPL
828591	2004 TQ_{385}	—	October 15, 2004	Mount Lemmon	Mount Lemmon Survey	·	2.1 km	MPC · JPL
828592	2004 TR_{385}	—	March 19, 2018	Haleakala	Pan-STARRS 1	V	510 m	MPC · JPL
828593	2004 TU_{385}	—	October 5, 2004	Kitt Peak	Spacewatch	·	2.1 km	MPC · JPL
828594	2004 TK_{386}	—	October 15, 2004	Mount Lemmon	Mount Lemmon Survey	·	2.1 km	MPC · JPL
828595	2004 TC_{387}	—	October 7, 2004	Kitt Peak	Spacewatch	·	770 m	MPC · JPL
828596	2004 TJ_{387}	—	October 7, 2004	Kitt Peak	Spacewatch	·	810 m	MPC · JPL
828597	2004 UB_{12}	—	March 18, 2010	Mount Lemmon	Mount Lemmon Survey	·	890 m	MPC · JPL
828598	2004 UE_{12}	—	October 18, 2004	Kitt Peak	Deep Ecliptic Survey	THM	1.7 km	MPC · JPL
828599	2004 VF_{11}	—	November 3, 2004	Palomar	NEAT	·	2.5 km	MPC · JPL
828600	2004 VP_{33}	—	November 3, 2004	Kitt Peak	Spacewatch	·	1.0 km	MPC · JPL

== 828601–828700 ==
back to top

Designation			Discovery			Properties		Ref
Permanent	Provisional	Named after	Date	Site	Discoverer(s)	Category	Diam.	Ref
828601	2004 VG_{35}	—	October 10, 2004	Kitt Peak	Spacewatch	·	1.5 km	MPC · JPL
828602	2004 VX_{41}	—	October 13, 2004	Kitt Peak	Spacewatch	·	1.3 km	MPC · JPL
828603	2004 VE_{50}	—	November 4, 2004	Kitt Peak	Spacewatch	·	1.2 km	MPC · JPL
828604	2004 VF_{66}	—	October 6, 2004	Kitt Peak	Spacewatch	·	960 m	MPC · JPL
828605	2004 VF_{68}	—	October 15, 2004	Kitt Peak	Spacewatch	·	1.7 km	MPC · JPL
828606	2004 VG_{89}	—	November 11, 2004	Kitt Peak	Spacewatch	MAR	740 m	MPC · JPL
828607	2004 VT_{98}	—	November 9, 2004	Mauna Kea	Veillet, C.	HYG	1.7 km	MPC · JPL
828608	2004 VP_{101}	—	November 9, 2004	Mauna Kea	Veillet, C.	·	700 m	MPC · JPL
828609	2004 VX_{127}	—	November 9, 2004	Mauna Kea	P. A. Wiegert, A. Papadimos	·	1.7 km	MPC · JPL
828610	2004 VL_{133}	—	May 14, 2016	Mount Lemmon	Mount Lemmon Survey	H	400 m	MPC · JPL
828611	2004 VS_{136}	—	February 14, 2010	Mount Lemmon	Mount Lemmon Survey	·	1.1 km	MPC · JPL
828612	2004 VX_{136}	—	January 29, 2010	WISE	WISE	·	1.6 km	MPC · JPL
828613	2004 VA_{137}	—	October 15, 2017	Mount Lemmon	Mount Lemmon Survey	·	1.2 km	MPC · JPL
828614	2004 VM_{138}	—	November 11, 2004	Kitt Peak	Spacewatch	·	1.1 km	MPC · JPL
828615	2004 WE_{14}	—	November 20, 2004	Kitt Peak	Spacewatch	·	1.2 km	MPC · JPL
828616	2004 XR_{17}	—	December 3, 2004	Kitt Peak	Spacewatch	T_{j} (2.85)	2.4 km	MPC · JPL
828617	2004 XR_{36}	—	December 11, 2004	Campo Imperatore	CINEOS	·	1.1 km	MPC · JPL
828618	2004 XW_{55}	—	December 10, 2004	Kitt Peak	Spacewatch	EUN	1.0 km	MPC · JPL
828619	2004 XT_{71}	—	December 12, 2004	Kitt Peak	Spacewatch	·	1.4 km	MPC · JPL
828620	2004 XR_{90}	—	December 11, 2004	Kitt Peak	Spacewatch	·	600 m	MPC · JPL
828621	2004 XO_{112}	—	December 10, 2004	Kitt Peak	Spacewatch	·	1.8 km	MPC · JPL
828622	2004 XC_{130}	—	December 15, 2004	Socorro	LINEAR	·	3.7 km	MPC · JPL
828623	2004 XZ_{151}	—	December 15, 2004	Kitt Peak	Spacewatch	·	980 m	MPC · JPL
828624	2004 XH_{154}	—	December 15, 2004	Kitt Peak	Spacewatch	·	1.1 km	MPC · JPL
828625	2004 XM_{156}	—	December 14, 2004	Kitt Peak	Spacewatch	·	990 m	MPC · JPL
828626	2004 XC_{167}	—	September 18, 2004	Socorro	LINEAR	·	1.3 km	MPC · JPL
828627	2004 XG_{167}	—	December 3, 2004	Kitt Peak	Spacewatch	·	1.3 km	MPC · JPL
828628	2004 XC_{185}	—	December 11, 2004	Kitt Peak	Spacewatch	DOR	1.7 km	MPC · JPL
828629	2004 XA_{187}	—	December 11, 2004	Mauna Kea	P. A. Wiegert, D. D. Balam	·	3.2 km	MPC · JPL
828630	2004 XS_{187}	—	December 11, 2004	Mauna Kea	P. A. Wiegert, D. D. Balam	·	490 m	MPC · JPL
828631	2004 XT_{187}	—	December 11, 2004	Mauna Kea	P. A. Wiegert, D. D. Balam	·	1.3 km	MPC · JPL
828632	2004 XC_{188}	—	December 15, 2004	Mauna Kea	P. A. Wiegert, D. D. Balam	·	1.5 km	MPC · JPL
828633	2004 XE_{188}	—	December 12, 2004	Kitt Peak	Spacewatch	·	1.5 km	MPC · JPL
828634	2004 XJ_{188}	—	December 15, 2004	Mauna Kea	P. A. Wiegert, D. D. Balam	·	2.3 km	MPC · JPL
828635	2004 XK_{195}	—	December 6, 2011	Haleakala	Pan-STARRS 1	·	610 m	MPC · JPL
828636	2004 XB_{196}	—	January 13, 2010	WISE	WISE	(895)	3.1 km	MPC · JPL
828637	2004 XF_{197}	—	May 18, 2015	Haleakala	Pan-STARRS 1	·	1.5 km	MPC · JPL
828638	2004 XN_{198}	—	February 5, 2010	WISE	WISE	·	2.6 km	MPC · JPL
828639	2004 XZ_{198}	—	July 9, 2019	Palomar Mountain	Zwicky Transient Facility	·	2.0 km	MPC · JPL
828640	2004 XF_{199}	—	December 14, 2004	Kitt Peak	Spacewatch	·	1.4 km	MPC · JPL
828641	2004 XJ_{199}	—	September 15, 2007	Kitt Peak	Spacewatch	·	500 m	MPC · JPL
828642	2004 XQ_{199}	—	December 13, 2004	Kitt Peak	Spacewatch	TIR	2.2 km	MPC · JPL
828643	2004 XS_{199}	—	December 9, 2004	Kitt Peak	Spacewatch	·	1.0 km	MPC · JPL
828644	2004 XU_{199}	—	October 10, 2008	Kitt Peak	Spacewatch	·	1.1 km	MPC · JPL
828645	2004 XB_{200}	—	July 12, 2013	Haleakala	Pan-STARRS 1	·	1.6 km	MPC · JPL
828646	2004 YL	—	December 17, 2004	Socorro	LINEAR	H	410 m	MPC · JPL
828647	2004 YX_{4}	—	December 17, 2004	Socorro	LINEAR	·	2.0 km	MPC · JPL
828648	2004 YZ_{13}	—	December 19, 2004	Mount Lemmon	Mount Lemmon Survey	LIX	2.2 km	MPC · JPL
828649	2004 YY_{24}	—	December 18, 2004	Mount Lemmon	Mount Lemmon Survey	·	1.5 km	MPC · JPL
828650	2004 YU_{38}	—	December 19, 2004	Kitt Peak	Spacewatch	EUN	1.0 km	MPC · JPL
828651	2004 YM_{39}	—	December 20, 2004	Mount Lemmon	Mount Lemmon Survey	·	2.2 km	MPC · JPL
828652	2004 YG_{40}	—	November 22, 2009	Mount Lemmon	Mount Lemmon Survey	H	310 m	MPC · JPL
828653	2004 YE_{41}	—	June 29, 2016	Haleakala	Pan-STARRS 1	H	330 m	MPC · JPL
828654	2004 YR_{41}	—	December 16, 2004	Catalina	CSS	BAR	880 m	MPC · JPL
828655	2004 YU_{41}	—	December 18, 2004	Mount Lemmon	Mount Lemmon Survey	·	900 m	MPC · JPL
828656	2005 AE_{71}	—	January 15, 2005	Kitt Peak	Spacewatch	·	3.9 km	MPC · JPL
828657	2005 AO_{85}	—	March 2, 2016	Haleakala	Pan-STARRS 1	·	2.1 km	MPC · JPL
828658	2005 BA_{30}	—	January 13, 2005	Kitt Peak	Spacewatch	·	1.4 km	MPC · JPL
828659	2005 BH_{32}	—	January 16, 2005	Mauna Kea	Veillet, C.	EOS	1.3 km	MPC · JPL
828660	2005 BS_{39}	—	January 16, 2005	Mauna Kea	Veillet, C.	3:2	3.8 km	MPC · JPL
828661	2005 BK_{41}	—	January 16, 2005	Mauna Kea	Veillet, C.	·	420 m	MPC · JPL
828662	2005 BC_{47}	—	January 16, 2005	Mauna Kea	P. A. Wiegert, D. D. Balam	·	1.4 km	MPC · JPL
828663	2005 BD_{47}	—	January 16, 2005	Mauna Kea	P. A. Wiegert, D. D. Balam	KOR	940 m	MPC · JPL
828664	2005 BL_{51}	—	January 16, 2005	Kitt Peak	Spacewatch	·	650 m	MPC · JPL
828665	2005 BP_{51}	—	January 16, 2005	Kitt Peak	Spacewatch	·	3.1 km	MPC · JPL
828666	2005 BH_{52}	—	January 17, 2005	Kitt Peak	Spacewatch	L5	10 km	MPC · JPL
828667	2005 BM_{54}	—	August 13, 2012	Kitt Peak	Spacewatch	·	1.4 km	MPC · JPL
828668	2005 BZ_{54}	—	February 3, 2010	WISE	WISE	·	2.6 km	MPC · JPL
828669	2005 BR_{55}	—	January 16, 2005	Kitt Peak	Spacewatch	·	1.0 km	MPC · JPL
828670	2005 CN_{13}	—	February 2, 2005	Kitt Peak	Spacewatch	·	1.4 km	MPC · JPL
828671	2005 CU_{28}	—	February 1, 2005	Kitt Peak	Spacewatch	·	2.7 km	MPC · JPL
828672	2005 CQ_{35}	—	February 2, 2005	Catalina	CSS	·	2.2 km	MPC · JPL
828673	2005 CP_{37}	—	February 7, 2005	Altschwendt	W. Ries	·	1.3 km	MPC · JPL
828674	2005 CL_{39}	—	February 9, 2005	La Silla	A. Boattini, H. Scholl	AEO	750 m	MPC · JPL
828675	2005 CY_{40}	—	February 9, 2005	La Silla	A. Boattini, H. Scholl	·	2.0 km	MPC · JPL
828676	2005 CN_{42}	—	February 2, 2005	Kitt Peak	Spacewatch	THB	2.1 km	MPC · JPL
828677	2005 CJ_{45}	—	February 2, 2005	Kitt Peak	Spacewatch	JUN	760 m	MPC · JPL
828678	2005 CF_{84}	—	August 14, 2012	Haleakala	Pan-STARRS 1	·	1.7 km	MPC · JPL
828679	2005 CW_{85}	—	February 10, 2014	Haleakala	Pan-STARRS 1	AEO	970 m	MPC · JPL
828680	2005 CY_{88}	—	February 14, 2005	Catalina	CSS	·	1.0 km	MPC · JPL
828681	2005 DL_{4}	—	February 13, 2010	Mount Lemmon	Mount Lemmon Survey	·	2.1 km	MPC · JPL
828682	2005 EZ_{125}	—	March 8, 2005	Mount Lemmon	Mount Lemmon Survey	TIR	2.3 km	MPC · JPL
828683	2005 EQ_{135}	—	March 9, 2005	Mount Lemmon	Mount Lemmon Survey	·	1.8 km	MPC · JPL
828684	2005 ER_{157}	—	March 9, 2005	Mount Lemmon	Mount Lemmon Survey	·	560 m	MPC · JPL
828685	2005 ED_{164}	—	March 10, 2005	Mount Lemmon	Mount Lemmon Survey	·	2.2 km	MPC · JPL
828686	2005 EW_{164}	—	March 11, 2005	Kitt Peak	Spacewatch	H	370 m	MPC · JPL
828687	2005 ET_{172}	—	March 8, 2005	Kitt Peak	Spacewatch	·	2.6 km	MPC · JPL
828688	2005 EJ_{186}	—	March 10, 2005	Anderson Mesa	LONEOS	·	1.3 km	MPC · JPL
828689	2005 EO_{196}	—	March 11, 2005	Mount Lemmon	Mount Lemmon Survey	·	730 m	MPC · JPL
828690	2005 EU_{256}	—	March 11, 2005	Mount Lemmon	Mount Lemmon Survey	·	1.9 km	MPC · JPL
828691	2005 EN_{259}	—	March 11, 2005	Mount Lemmon	Mount Lemmon Survey	·	1.1 km	MPC · JPL
828692	2005 EG_{282}	—	March 10, 2005	Mount Lemmon	Mount Lemmon Survey	·	760 m	MPC · JPL
828693	2005 EE_{286}	—	March 2, 2005	Socorro	LINEAR	EUP	3.4 km	MPC · JPL
828694	2005 EX_{311}	—	March 10, 2005	Mount Lemmon	Mount Lemmon Survey	MAS	470 m	MPC · JPL
828695	2005 ET_{314}	—	March 11, 2005	Kitt Peak	Deep Ecliptic Survey	AGN	760 m	MPC · JPL
828696	2005 EW_{334}	—	March 8, 2005	Anderson Mesa	LONEOS	H	410 m	MPC · JPL
828697	2005 EJ_{335}	—	March 10, 2005	Mount Lemmon	Mount Lemmon Survey	·	560 m	MPC · JPL
828698	2005 ER_{335}	—	March 8, 2005	Mount Lemmon	Mount Lemmon Survey	·	1.6 km	MPC · JPL
828699	2005 EP_{338}	—	October 14, 2010	Mount Lemmon	Mount Lemmon Survey	NYS	540 m	MPC · JPL
828700	2005 EC_{340}	—	March 3, 2005	Kitt Peak	Spacewatch	·	2.8 km	MPC · JPL

== 828701–828800 ==
back to top

Designation			Discovery			Properties		Ref
Permanent	Provisional	Named after	Date	Site	Discoverer(s)	Category	Diam.	Ref
828701	2005 EM_{341}	—	April 7, 2010	WISE	WISE	·	2.4 km	MPC · JPL
828702	2005 EY_{342}	—	March 8, 2005	Mount Lemmon	Mount Lemmon Survey	(5)	960 m	MPC · JPL
828703	2005 EB_{343}	—	July 11, 2018	Haleakala	Pan-STARRS 1	·	2.4 km	MPC · JPL
828704	2005 ED_{343}	—	January 20, 2012	Kitt Peak	Spacewatch	·	610 m	MPC · JPL
828705	2005 EB_{344}	—	February 2, 2010	WISE	WISE	·	1.4 km	MPC · JPL
828706	2005 EE_{344}	—	March 13, 2005	Kitt Peak	Spacewatch	·	1.2 km	MPC · JPL
828707	2005 EJ_{344}	—	February 28, 2014	Haleakala	Pan-STARRS 1	·	1.3 km	MPC · JPL
828708	2005 ED_{345}	—	April 4, 2010	WISE	WISE	EUP	2.8 km	MPC · JPL
828709	2005 EP_{345}	—	August 15, 2013	Haleakala	Pan-STARRS 1	ERI	1.1 km	MPC · JPL
828710	2005 EK_{346}	—	February 28, 2009	Kitt Peak	Spacewatch	·	650 m	MPC · JPL
828711	2005 EX_{347}	—	April 1, 2010	WISE	WISE	T_{j} (2.98)	2.5 km	MPC · JPL
828712	2005 FO_{4}	—	March 31, 2005	Socorro	LINEAR	·	1.8 km	MPC · JPL
828713	2005 FR_{12}	—	May 2, 2016	Mount Lemmon	Mount Lemmon Survey	·	650 m	MPC · JPL
828714	2005 FA_{19}	—	August 30, 2016	Mount Lemmon	Mount Lemmon Survey	·	1.6 km	MPC · JPL
828715	2005 FF_{19}	—	March 16, 2005	Catalina	CSS	(116763)	1.4 km	MPC · JPL
828716	2005 GE	—	April 1, 2005	Piszkéstető	K. Sárneczky	(194)	1.4 km	MPC · JPL
828717	2005 GY_{17}	—	April 2, 2005	Mount Lemmon	Mount Lemmon Survey	MAS	540 m	MPC · JPL
828718	2005 GF_{21}	—	April 3, 2005	Palomar	NEAT	·	1.4 km	MPC · JPL
828719	2005 GX_{30}	—	April 4, 2005	Mount Lemmon	Mount Lemmon Survey	·	2.3 km	MPC · JPL
828720	2005 GV_{46}	—	April 5, 2005	Mount Lemmon	Mount Lemmon Survey	·	2.3 km	MPC · JPL
828721	2005 GV_{66}	—	August 8, 2012	Haleakala	Pan-STARRS 1	·	450 m	MPC · JPL
828722	2005 GB_{72}	—	March 9, 2005	Mount Lemmon	Mount Lemmon Survey	·	1.9 km	MPC · JPL
828723	2005 GO_{99}	—	March 11, 2005	Mount Lemmon	Mount Lemmon Survey	·	2.6 km	MPC · JPL
828724	2005 GU_{105}	—	April 10, 2005	Kitt Peak	Spacewatch	·	860 m	MPC · JPL
828725	2005 GX_{121}	—	April 6, 2005	Mount Lemmon	Mount Lemmon Survey	·	2.3 km	MPC · JPL
828726	2005 GB_{155}	—	April 10, 2005	Mount Lemmon	Mount Lemmon Survey	ADE	1.6 km	MPC · JPL
828727	2005 GT_{190}	—	April 12, 2005	Kitt Peak	Deep Ecliptic Survey	·	920 m	MPC · JPL
828728	2005 GX_{199}	—	April 10, 2005	Kitt Peak	Deep Ecliptic Survey	·	800 m	MPC · JPL
828729	2005 GM_{230}	—	July 5, 2016	Haleakala	Pan-STARRS 1	·	620 m	MPC · JPL
828730	2005 GB_{231}	—	April 12, 2005	Mount Lemmon	Mount Lemmon Survey	·	1.2 km	MPC · JPL
828731	2005 GL_{233}	—	August 30, 2011	Marly	P. Kocher	(1547)	1.4 km	MPC · JPL
828732	2005 GZ_{234}	—	February 27, 2012	Haleakala	Pan-STARRS 1	·	500 m	MPC · JPL
828733	2005 GP_{237}	—	February 20, 2009	Kitt Peak	Spacewatch	·	1.4 km	MPC · JPL
828734	2005 GG_{241}	—	April 9, 2005	Kitt Peak	Spacewatch	·	490 m	MPC · JPL
828735	2005 HY_{11}	—	October 26, 2014	Haleakala	Pan-STARRS 1	H	380 m	MPC · JPL
828736	2005 JM_{15}	—	May 3, 2005	Kitt Peak	Spacewatch	·	1.4 km	MPC · JPL
828737	2005 JJ_{25}	—	May 3, 2005	Kitt Peak	Spacewatch	·	1.6 km	MPC · JPL
828738	2005 JT_{51}	—	May 4, 2005	Kitt Peak	Spacewatch	·	2.1 km	MPC · JPL
828739	2005 JW_{57}	—	May 7, 2005	Kitt Peak	Spacewatch	·	980 m	MPC · JPL
828740	2005 JA_{60}	—	May 8, 2005	Kitt Peak	Spacewatch	·	2.4 km	MPC · JPL
828741	2005 JW_{69}	—	April 11, 2005	Mount Lemmon	Mount Lemmon Survey	·	1.3 km	MPC · JPL
828742	2005 JD_{71}	—	May 7, 2005	Mount Lemmon	Mount Lemmon Survey	EUP	2.7 km	MPC · JPL
828743	2005 JC_{81}	—	May 4, 2005	Kitt Peak	D. E. Trilling, A. S. Rivkin	·	1.3 km	MPC · JPL
828744	2005 JV_{89}	—	May 11, 2005	Mount Lemmon	Mount Lemmon Survey	TIR	1.9 km	MPC · JPL
828745	2005 JX_{109}	—	March 9, 2005	Anderson Mesa	LONEOS	·	2.5 km	MPC · JPL
828746	2005 JC_{112}	—	May 9, 2005	Mount Lemmon	Mount Lemmon Survey	·	2.9 km	MPC · JPL
828747	2005 JP_{135}	—	May 10, 2005	Kitt Peak	Spacewatch	H	440 m	MPC · JPL
828748	2005 JW_{147}	—	May 19, 2005	Mount Lemmon	Mount Lemmon Survey	·	3.2 km	MPC · JPL
828749	2005 JW_{152}	—	May 4, 2005	Kitt Peak	Spacewatch	·	690 m	MPC · JPL
828750	2005 JP_{155}	—	April 16, 2005	Kitt Peak	Spacewatch	·	2.0 km	MPC · JPL
828751	2005 JP_{158}	—	April 16, 2005	Kitt Peak	Spacewatch	·	1.0 km	MPC · JPL
828752	2005 JK_{161}	—	May 8, 2005	Kitt Peak	Spacewatch	·	890 m	MPC · JPL
828753	2005 JX_{168}	—	May 9, 2005	Cerro Tololo	Deep Ecliptic Survey	·	1.0 km	MPC · JPL
828754	2005 JA_{176}	—	May 3, 2005	Catalina	CSS	PHO	870 m	MPC · JPL
828755	2005 JL_{183}	—	May 14, 2005	Mount Lemmon	Mount Lemmon Survey	H	350 m	MPC · JPL
828756	2005 JU_{183}	—	May 19, 2005	Mount Lemmon	Mount Lemmon Survey	·	1.8 km	MPC · JPL
828757	2005 JP_{188}	—	May 14, 2005	Kitt Peak	Spacewatch	·	2.8 km	MPC · JPL
828758	2005 JC_{190}	—	November 3, 2008	Kitt Peak	Spacewatch	·	2.6 km	MPC · JPL
828759	2005 JD_{191}	—	October 17, 2006	Mount Lemmon	Mount Lemmon Survey	·	1.5 km	MPC · JPL
828760	2005 JE_{191}	—	April 15, 2018	Mount Lemmon	Mount Lemmon Survey	H	370 m	MPC · JPL
828761	2005 JQ_{193}	—	May 3, 2010	WISE	WISE	AEG	2.0 km	MPC · JPL
828762	2005 KK_{11}	—	May 16, 2005	Palomar	NEAT	·	3.3 km	MPC · JPL
828763	2005 KP_{15}	—	May 24, 2010	WISE	WISE	·	1.4 km	MPC · JPL
828764	2005 LC_{31}	—	May 15, 2005	Mount Lemmon	Mount Lemmon Survey	·	790 m	MPC · JPL
828765	2005 LH_{37}	—	May 16, 2005	Palomar	NEAT	·	1.4 km	MPC · JPL
828766	2005 LP_{47}	—	June 14, 2005	Mount Lemmon	Mount Lemmon Survey	·	2.4 km	MPC · JPL
828767	2005 LJ_{56}	—	July 27, 2001	Anderson Mesa	LONEOS	·	1.5 km	MPC · JPL
828768	2005 LM_{56}	—	June 8, 2016	Mount Lemmon	Mount Lemmon Survey	·	710 m	MPC · JPL
828769	2005 LS_{57}	—	May 23, 2010	WISE	WISE	ADE	1.8 km	MPC · JPL
828770	2005 MH_{13}	—	June 30, 2005	Kitt Peak	Spacewatch	H	430 m	MPC · JPL
828771	2005 MK_{40}	—	June 30, 2005	Kitt Peak	Spacewatch	·	550 m	MPC · JPL
828772	2005 MQ_{56}	—	June 30, 2005	Palomar	NEAT	·	1.4 km	MPC · JPL
828773	2005 MV_{56}	—	June 17, 2005	Mount Lemmon	Mount Lemmon Survey	·	740 m	MPC · JPL
828774	2005 NQ_{29}	—	July 2, 2005	Kitt Peak	Spacewatch	H	430 m	MPC · JPL
828775	2005 NA_{76}	—	July 10, 2005	Kitt Peak	Spacewatch	·	1.8 km	MPC · JPL
828776	2005 NX_{88}	—	February 16, 2010	WISE	WISE	·	2.6 km	MPC · JPL
828777	2005 NH_{100}	—	July 12, 2005	Mount Lemmon	Mount Lemmon Survey	THM	1.7 km	MPC · JPL
828778	2005 NH_{103}	—	March 21, 1999	Sacramento Peak	SDSS	·	2.0 km	MPC · JPL
828779	2005 NB_{107}	—	July 7, 2005	Mauna Kea	Veillet, C.	MAS	390 m	MPC · JPL
828780	2005 NC_{109}	—	July 7, 2005	Mauna Kea	Veillet, C.	·	1.7 km	MPC · JPL
828781	2005 NM_{117}	—	July 15, 2005	Mount Lemmon	Mount Lemmon Survey	·	2.7 km	MPC · JPL
828782	2005 NK_{129}	—	November 21, 2014	Haleakala	Pan-STARRS 1	H	410 m	MPC · JPL
828783	2005 NC_{132}	—	June 26, 2015	Haleakala	Pan-STARRS 1	·	490 m	MPC · JPL
828784	2005 NV_{132}	—	January 15, 2018	Haleakala	Pan-STARRS 1	KOR	990 m	MPC · JPL
828785	2005 OZ	—	July 5, 2005	Siding Spring	SSS	·	660 m	MPC · JPL
828786	2005 ON_{5}	—	July 28, 2005	Palomar	NEAT	·	550 m	MPC · JPL
828787	2005 OS_{8}	—	June 15, 2005	Mount Lemmon	Mount Lemmon Survey	·	940 m	MPC · JPL
828788	2005 OB_{13}	—	July 29, 2005	Palomar	NEAT	·	560 m	MPC · JPL
828789	2005 OQ_{13}	—	July 29, 2005	Palomar	NEAT	·	1.2 km	MPC · JPL
828790	2005 PQ	—	August 2, 2005	Kambah	Herald, D.	·	1 km	MPC · JPL
828791	2005 PC_{6}	—	August 9, 2005	Saint-Sulpice	B. Christophe	·	720 m	MPC · JPL
828792	2005 PV_{8}	—	August 4, 2005	Palomar	NEAT	·	1.1 km	MPC · JPL
828793	2005 PO_{15}	—	July 28, 2005	Palomar	NEAT	·	520 m	MPC · JPL
828794	2005 PB_{18}	—	July 31, 2005	Palomar	NEAT	·	1.0 km	MPC · JPL
828795	2005 PD_{22}	—	August 6, 2005	Palomar	NEAT	·	2.4 km	MPC · JPL
828796	2005 PH_{26}	—	August 5, 2005	Mauna Kea	P. A. Wiegert, D. D. Balam	·	490 m	MPC · JPL
828797	2005 PX_{28}	—	August 6, 2005	Palomar	NEAT	·	2.1 km	MPC · JPL
828798	2005 PX_{30}	—	February 27, 2010	WISE	WISE	PHO	850 m	MPC · JPL
828799	2005 PS_{31}	—	August 8, 2005	Cerro Tololo	Deep Ecliptic Survey	·	750 m	MPC · JPL
828800	2005 PF_{33}	—	August 6, 2005	Palomar	NEAT	·	930 m	MPC · JPL

== 828801–828900 ==
back to top

Designation			Discovery			Properties		Ref
Permanent	Provisional	Named after	Date	Site	Discoverer(s)	Category	Diam.	Ref
828801	2005 QG	—	August 26, 2005	Anderson Mesa	LONEOS	·	1.6 km	MPC · JPL
828802	2005 QX_{27}	—	August 27, 2005	Kitt Peak	Spacewatch	·	2.8 km	MPC · JPL
828803	2005 QL_{92}	—	August 26, 2005	Palomar	NEAT	·	1.6 km	MPC · JPL
828804	2005 QJ_{98}	—	August 31, 2005	Kitt Peak	Spacewatch	·	2.0 km	MPC · JPL
828805	2005 QU_{115}	—	August 28, 2005	Kitt Peak	Spacewatch	·	440 m	MPC · JPL
828806	2005 QR_{116}	—	August 28, 2005	Kitt Peak	Spacewatch	·	1.0 km	MPC · JPL
828807	2005 QM_{121}	—	July 30, 2005	Palomar	NEAT	NYS	880 m	MPC · JPL
828808	2005 QA_{140}	—	August 28, 2005	Kitt Peak	Spacewatch	·	390 m	MPC · JPL
828809	2005 QP_{153}	—	August 27, 2005	Palomar	NEAT	·	1.7 km	MPC · JPL
828810	2005 QY_{154}	—	August 4, 2005	Palomar	NEAT	·	1.0 km	MPC · JPL
828811	2005 QO_{162}	—	August 30, 2005	Palomar	NEAT	·	730 m	MPC · JPL
828812	2005 QW_{163}	—	September 1, 2005	Palomar	NEAT	H	370 m	MPC · JPL
828813	2005 QV_{184}	—	August 30, 2005	Mauna Kea	P. A. Wiegert	EOS	1.3 km	MPC · JPL
828814	2005 QC_{185}	—	August 30, 2005	Mauna Kea	P. A. Wiegert	·	930 m	MPC · JPL
828815	2005 QK_{185}	—	September 20, 2014	Haleakala	Pan-STARRS 1	·	1.0 km	MPC · JPL
828816	2005 QV_{185}	—	September 2, 2005	Mauna Kea	P. A. Wiegert	·	1.5 km	MPC · JPL
828817	2005 QA_{188}	—	August 30, 2005	Kitt Peak	Spacewatch	·	780 m	MPC · JPL
828818	2005 QD_{194}	—	May 1, 2010	WISE	WISE	·	2.7 km	MPC · JPL
828819	2005 QX_{195}	—	October 18, 2009	Catalina	CSS	·	1 km	MPC · JPL
828820	2005 QS_{196}	—	April 17, 2012	Kitt Peak	Spacewatch	·	880 m	MPC · JPL
828821	2005 QY_{200}	—	August 30, 2005	Palomar	NEAT	·	1.4 km	MPC · JPL
828822	2005 QY_{204}	—	August 29, 2005	Kitt Peak	Spacewatch	·	970 m	MPC · JPL
828823	2005 QY_{205}	—	August 29, 2005	Kitt Peak	Spacewatch	·	1.3 km	MPC · JPL
828824	2005 QE_{206}	—	August 27, 2005	Palomar	NEAT	·	860 m	MPC · JPL
828825	2005 QD_{209}	—	August 26, 2005	Palomar	NEAT	·	2.1 km	MPC · JPL
828826	2005 RC_{12}	—	September 1, 2005	Kitt Peak	Spacewatch	·	710 m	MPC · JPL
828827	2005 RX_{14}	—	September 1, 2005	Kitt Peak	Spacewatch	·	2.7 km	MPC · JPL
828828	2005 RL_{16}	—	September 1, 2005	Anderson Mesa	LONEOS	EUP	3.3 km	MPC · JPL
828829	2005 RT_{16}	—	September 1, 2005	Kitt Peak	Spacewatch	·	1.8 km	MPC · JPL
828830	2005 RR_{17}	—	August 26, 2005	Palomar	NEAT	·	510 m	MPC · JPL
828831	2005 RB_{19}	—	September 1, 2005	Kitt Peak	Spacewatch	(5)	820 m	MPC · JPL
828832	2005 RC_{26}	—	August 31, 2005	Anderson Mesa	LONEOS	·	700 m	MPC · JPL
828833	2005 RV_{38}	—	September 3, 2005	Mauna Kea	Veillet, C.	PHO	750 m	MPC · JPL
828834	2005 RZ_{41}	—	September 14, 2005	Kitt Peak	Spacewatch	·	570 m	MPC · JPL
828835	2005 RS_{55}	—	September 13, 2005	Kitt Peak	Spacewatch	·	690 m	MPC · JPL
828836	2005 RT_{55}	—	August 25, 2016	Kitt Peak	Spacewatch	THM	1.8 km	MPC · JPL
828837	2005 RQ_{56}	—	September 8, 2016	Haleakala	Pan-STARRS 1	PHO	820 m	MPC · JPL
828838	2005 RG_{58}	—	September 13, 2005	Kitt Peak	Spacewatch	·	870 m	MPC · JPL
828839	2005 RW_{59}	—	September 1, 2005	Kitt Peak	Spacewatch	·	1.4 km	MPC · JPL
828840	2005 RW_{61}	—	September 1, 2005	Palomar	NEAT	EUN	860 m	MPC · JPL
828841	2005 RE_{62}	—	September 1, 2005	Palomar	NEAT	·	870 m	MPC · JPL
828842	2005 RG_{64}	—	September 12, 2005	Kitt Peak	Spacewatch	·	2.7 km	MPC · JPL
828843	2005 SS_{11}	—	September 23, 2005	Kitt Peak	Spacewatch	MRX	850 m	MPC · JPL
828844	2005 ST_{16}	—	September 26, 2005	Kitt Peak	Spacewatch	MIS	2.1 km	MPC · JPL
828845	2005 SJ_{17}	—	September 26, 2005	Kitt Peak	Spacewatch	·	810 m	MPC · JPL
828846	2005 SQ_{18}	—	September 26, 2005	Kitt Peak	Spacewatch	·	780 m	MPC · JPL
828847	2005 ST_{32}	—	September 23, 2005	Kitt Peak	Spacewatch	·	2.8 km	MPC · JPL
828848	2005 SF_{33}	—	September 23, 2005	Kitt Peak	Spacewatch	NYS	830 m	MPC · JPL
828849	2005 SG_{41}	—	September 24, 2005	Kitt Peak	Spacewatch	·	620 m	MPC · JPL
828850	2005 SR_{55}	—	January 29, 2003	Sacramento Peak	SDSS	·	580 m	MPC · JPL
828851	2005 SY_{87}	—	September 24, 2005	Kitt Peak	Spacewatch	·	680 m	MPC · JPL
828852	2005 SW_{110}	—	September 12, 2005	Junk Bond	D. Healy	·	1.5 km	MPC · JPL
828853	2005 SF_{124}	—	September 29, 2005	Anderson Mesa	LONEOS	·	2.8 km	MPC · JPL
828854	2005 SH_{128}	—	September 23, 2005	Catalina	CSS	·	630 m	MPC · JPL
828855	2005 ST_{146}	—	September 25, 2005	Kitt Peak	Spacewatch	·	2.4 km	MPC · JPL
828856	2005 SV_{162}	—	September 23, 2005	Catalina	CSS	·	1.2 km	MPC · JPL
828857	2005 SQ_{186}	—	September 29, 2005	Mount Lemmon	Mount Lemmon Survey	H	440 m	MPC · JPL
828858	2005 SB_{195}	—	August 31, 2005	Kitt Peak	Spacewatch	·	1.3 km	MPC · JPL
828859	2005 SF_{204}	—	September 30, 2005	Mount Lemmon	Mount Lemmon Survey	·	670 m	MPC · JPL
828860	2005 SR_{219}	—	September 30, 2005	Palomar	NEAT	·	490 m	MPC · JPL
828861	2005 SJ_{224}	—	September 29, 2005	Mount Lemmon	Mount Lemmon Survey	·	2.3 km	MPC · JPL
828862	2005 SV_{227}	—	September 24, 2005	Kitt Peak	Spacewatch	·	1.3 km	MPC · JPL
828863	2005 SD_{232}	—	September 30, 2005	Mount Lemmon	Mount Lemmon Survey	·	840 m	MPC · JPL
828864	2005 SP_{241}	—	September 30, 2005	Kitt Peak	Spacewatch	·	1.5 km	MPC · JPL
828865	2005 SF_{265}	—	September 26, 2005	Kitt Peak	Spacewatch	H	330 m	MPC · JPL
828866	2005 SS_{274}	—	September 29, 2005	Mount Lemmon	Mount Lemmon Survey	·	1.8 km	MPC · JPL
828867	2005 SV_{276}	—	September 30, 2005	Kitt Peak	Spacewatch	·	1.2 km	MPC · JPL
828868	2005 SB_{283}	—	September 27, 2005	Apache Point	SDSS Collaboration	·	730 m	MPC · JPL
828869	2005 SP_{288}	—	October 1, 2005	Apache Point	SDSS Collaboration	·	1.8 km	MPC · JPL
828870	2005 SZ_{288}	—	October 1, 2005	Apache Point	SDSS Collaboration	·	1.9 km	MPC · JPL
828871	2005 SZ_{293}	—	May 21, 2010	WISE	WISE	·	2.7 km	MPC · JPL
828872	2005 ST_{294}	—	September 30, 2005	Mount Lemmon	Mount Lemmon Survey	·	1.5 km	MPC · JPL
828873	2005 SR_{297}	—	September 23, 2012	Kitt Peak	Spacewatch	·	650 m	MPC · JPL
828874	2005 SQ_{298}	—	September 26, 2005	Kitt Peak	Spacewatch	·	960 m	MPC · JPL
828875	2005 SQ_{299}	—	September 23, 2005	Kitt Peak	Spacewatch	·	570 m	MPC · JPL
828876	2005 SR_{303}	—	September 26, 2005	Kitt Peak	Spacewatch	·	970 m	MPC · JPL
828877	2005 TO_{28}	—	September 1, 2005	Palomar	NEAT	·	1.4 km	MPC · JPL
828878	2005 TD_{47}	—	September 23, 2005	Bergisch Gladbach	W. Bickel	·	650 m	MPC · JPL
828879	2005 TN_{59}	—	October 2, 2005	Mount Lemmon	Mount Lemmon Survey	KOR	1.0 km	MPC · JPL
828880	2005 TU_{63}	—	September 26, 2005	Kitt Peak	Spacewatch	·	900 m	MPC · JPL
828881	2005 TK_{65}	—	October 1, 2005	Kitt Peak	Spacewatch	·	440 m	MPC · JPL
828882	2005 TC_{67}	—	October 5, 2005	Mount Lemmon	Mount Lemmon Survey	DOR	1.5 km	MPC · JPL
828883	2005 TZ_{68}	—	October 6, 2005	Kitt Peak	Spacewatch	·	2.0 km	MPC · JPL
828884	2005 TW_{69}	—	October 6, 2005	Kitt Peak	Spacewatch	·	560 m	MPC · JPL
828885	2005 TP_{70}	—	September 29, 2005	Mount Lemmon	Mount Lemmon Survey	·	490 m	MPC · JPL
828886	2005 TR_{70}	—	October 6, 2005	Mount Lemmon	Mount Lemmon Survey	·	490 m	MPC · JPL
828887	2005 TB_{71}	—	October 6, 2005	Mount Lemmon	Mount Lemmon Survey	·	800 m	MPC · JPL
828888	2005 TP_{80}	—	October 3, 2005	Kitt Peak	Spacewatch	ERI	1.5 km	MPC · JPL
828889	2005 TX_{88}	—	September 23, 2005	Kitt Peak	Spacewatch	·	2.1 km	MPC · JPL
828890	2005 TF_{93}	—	October 6, 2005	Kitt Peak	Spacewatch	GEF	940 m	MPC · JPL
828891	2005 TW_{101}	—	October 7, 2005	Mount Lemmon	Mount Lemmon Survey	HYG	2.2 km	MPC · JPL
828892	2005 TU_{108}	—	October 7, 2005	Kitt Peak	Spacewatch	·	1.2 km	MPC · JPL
828893	2005 TL_{112}	—	September 27, 2005	Kitt Peak	Spacewatch	·	1.4 km	MPC · JPL
828894	2005 TJ_{113}	—	October 7, 2005	Kitt Peak	Spacewatch	·	750 m	MPC · JPL
828895	2005 TH_{122}	—	September 29, 2005	Mount Lemmon	Mount Lemmon Survey	·	510 m	MPC · JPL
828896	2005 TN_{129}	—	September 30, 2005	Mount Lemmon	Mount Lemmon Survey	TIR	1.8 km	MPC · JPL
828897	2005 TP_{137}	—	October 6, 2005	Kitt Peak	Spacewatch	·	1.8 km	MPC · JPL
828898	2005 TQ_{144}	—	October 8, 2005	Kitt Peak	Spacewatch	·	2.4 km	MPC · JPL
828899	2005 TB_{154}	—	September 29, 2005	Mount Lemmon	Mount Lemmon Survey	·	590 m	MPC · JPL
828900	2005 TG_{158}	—	September 29, 2005	Kitt Peak	Spacewatch	·	790 m	MPC · JPL

== 828901–829000 ==
back to top

Designation			Discovery			Properties		Ref
Permanent	Provisional	Named after	Date	Site	Discoverer(s)	Category	Diam.	Ref
828901	2005 TM_{165}	—	October 9, 2005	Kitt Peak	Spacewatch	EOS	1.4 km	MPC · JPL
828902	2005 TR_{170}	—	October 6, 2005	Kitt Peak	Spacewatch	·	380 m	MPC · JPL
828903	2005 TD_{185}	—	October 1, 2005	Mount Lemmon	Mount Lemmon Survey	·	2.7 km	MPC · JPL
828904	2005 TF_{187}	—	October 6, 2005	Mount Lemmon	Mount Lemmon Survey	PHO	1.8 km	MPC · JPL
828905	2005 TS_{201}	—	July 11, 2016	Mount Lemmon	Mount Lemmon Survey	·	2.5 km	MPC · JPL
828906	2005 TK_{203}	—	February 19, 2009	Kitt Peak	Spacewatch	·	2.8 km	MPC · JPL
828907	2005 TO_{203}	—	July 15, 2016	Mount Lemmon	Mount Lemmon Survey	TIR	2.1 km	MPC · JPL
828908	2005 TU_{203}	—	October 7, 2005	Mauna Kea	A. Boattini	·	2.3 km	MPC · JPL
828909	2005 TU_{206}	—	February 20, 2014	Mount Lemmon	Mount Lemmon Survey	T_{j} (2.99) · 3:2	3.6 km	MPC · JPL
828910	2005 TY_{208}	—	March 9, 2008	Kitt Peak	Spacewatch	·	2.0 km	MPC · JPL
828911	2005 TS_{210}	—	March 17, 2016	Mount Lemmon	Mount Lemmon Survey	·	900 m	MPC · JPL
828912	2005 TE_{212}	—	November 3, 2012	Mount Lemmon	Mount Lemmon Survey	·	410 m	MPC · JPL
828913	2005 TJ_{213}	—	March 28, 2008	Mount Lemmon	Mount Lemmon Survey	·	1.3 km	MPC · JPL
828914	2005 TC_{217}	—	October 1, 2005	Mount Lemmon	Mount Lemmon Survey	·	1.0 km	MPC · JPL
828915	2005 TD_{221}	—	October 1, 2005	Mount Lemmon	Mount Lemmon Survey	·	2.0 km	MPC · JPL
828916	2005 TT_{221}	—	October 1, 2005	Mount Lemmon	Mount Lemmon Survey	·	850 m	MPC · JPL
828917	2005 TV_{221}	—	October 11, 2005	Kitt Peak	Spacewatch	·	1.5 km	MPC · JPL
828918	2005 TB_{222}	—	March 16, 2018	Mount Lemmon	Mount Lemmon Survey	EOS	1.3 km	MPC · JPL
828919	2005 UG_{11}	—	October 22, 2005	Kitt Peak	Spacewatch	·	1.9 km	MPC · JPL
828920	2005 UX_{19}	—	October 22, 2005	Kitt Peak	Spacewatch	·	500 m	MPC · JPL
828921	2005 UV_{24}	—	October 5, 2005	Kitt Peak	Spacewatch	·	830 m	MPC · JPL
828922	2005 UL_{44}	—	October 22, 2005	Kitt Peak	Spacewatch	·	660 m	MPC · JPL
828923	2005 UK_{46}	—	October 22, 2005	Kitt Peak	Spacewatch	·	420 m	MPC · JPL
828924	2005 UD_{63}	—	October 25, 2005	Mount Lemmon	Mount Lemmon Survey	·	590 m	MPC · JPL
828925	2005 UU_{76}	—	October 24, 2005	Kitt Peak	Spacewatch	·	440 m	MPC · JPL
828926	2005 UE_{84}	—	September 29, 2005	Mount Lemmon	Mount Lemmon Survey	·	1.5 km	MPC · JPL
828927	2005 UD_{88}	—	October 22, 2005	Kitt Peak	Spacewatch	URS	2.6 km	MPC · JPL
828928	2005 UV_{95}	—	October 22, 2005	Kitt Peak	Spacewatch	·	2.4 km	MPC · JPL
828929	2005 UR_{99}	—	October 22, 2005	Kitt Peak	Spacewatch	·	380 m	MPC · JPL
828930	2005 UJ_{101}	—	October 22, 2005	Kitt Peak	Spacewatch	·	910 m	MPC · JPL
828931	2005 UF_{122}	—	October 24, 2005	Kitt Peak	Spacewatch	·	860 m	MPC · JPL
828932	2005 UZ_{123}	—	October 24, 2005	Kitt Peak	Spacewatch	·	1.4 km	MPC · JPL
828933	2005 UB_{124}	—	October 1, 2005	Mount Lemmon	Mount Lemmon Survey	·	1.1 km	MPC · JPL
828934	2005 UM_{126}	—	September 29, 2000	Kitt Peak	Spacewatch	AGN	960 m	MPC · JPL
828935	2005 UN_{138}	—	October 25, 2005	Mount Lemmon	Mount Lemmon Survey	·	720 m	MPC · JPL
828936	2005 UQ_{151}	—	October 26, 2005	Kitt Peak	Spacewatch	·	400 m	MPC · JPL
828937	2005 UL_{153}	—	October 26, 2005	Kitt Peak	Spacewatch	·	830 m	MPC · JPL
828938	2005 UK_{157}	—	October 5, 2005	Catalina	CSS	·	1.4 km	MPC · JPL
828939	2005 UE_{172}	—	October 24, 2005	Kitt Peak	Spacewatch	MAS	490 m	MPC · JPL
828940	2005 UP_{179}	—	October 24, 2005	Kitt Peak	Spacewatch	HYG	2.3 km	MPC · JPL
828941	2005 UK_{180}	—	October 1, 2005	Mount Lemmon	Mount Lemmon Survey	·	1.4 km	MPC · JPL
828942	2005 US_{181}	—	October 24, 2005	Kitt Peak	Spacewatch	·	490 m	MPC · JPL
828943	2005 UO_{183}	—	October 25, 2005	Mount Lemmon	Mount Lemmon Survey	·	530 m	MPC · JPL
828944	2005 UA_{197}	—	October 24, 2005	Kitt Peak	Spacewatch	V	490 m	MPC · JPL
828945	2005 UC_{197}	—	October 24, 2005	Kitt Peak	Spacewatch	·	760 m	MPC · JPL
828946	2005 UM_{205}	—	September 30, 2005	Mount Lemmon	Mount Lemmon Survey	·	1.2 km	MPC · JPL
828947	2005 UN_{214}	—	October 26, 2005	Palomar	NEAT	T_{j} (2.99) · EUP	3.6 km	MPC · JPL
828948	2005 UF_{215}	—	October 28, 2005	Catalina	CSS	·	510 m	MPC · JPL
828949	2005 UV_{217}	—	October 22, 2005	Kitt Peak	Spacewatch	·	900 m	MPC · JPL
828950	2005 UK_{228}	—	October 25, 2005	Kitt Peak	Spacewatch	ERI	1.6 km	MPC · JPL
828951	2005 UE_{233}	—	October 25, 2005	Kitt Peak	Spacewatch	·	560 m	MPC · JPL
828952	2005 UH_{240}	—	December 18, 2001	Sacramento Peak	SDSS	·	2.7 km	MPC · JPL
828953	2005 UZ_{240}	—	October 25, 2005	Kitt Peak	Spacewatch	·	1.0 km	MPC · JPL
828954	2005 UW_{244}	—	October 25, 2005	Kitt Peak	Spacewatch	T_{j} (2.99) · EUP	2.0 km	MPC · JPL
828955	2005 UL_{246}	—	October 27, 2005	Kitt Peak	Spacewatch	·	2.4 km	MPC · JPL
828956	2005 UX_{247}	—	October 28, 2005	Mount Lemmon	Mount Lemmon Survey	·	1.0 km	MPC · JPL
828957	2005 UA_{252}	—	October 25, 2005	Kitt Peak	Spacewatch	·	530 m	MPC · JPL
828958	2005 UL_{255}	—	October 24, 2005	Kitt Peak	Spacewatch	TEL	930 m	MPC · JPL
828959	2005 UD_{256}	—	September 29, 2005	Kitt Peak	Spacewatch	·	2.2 km	MPC · JPL
828960	2005 UC_{267}	—	October 22, 2005	Kitt Peak	Spacewatch	·	3.5 km	MPC · JPL
828961	2005 UV_{267}	—	October 27, 2005	Kitt Peak	Spacewatch	·	800 m	MPC · JPL
828962	2005 UN_{268}	—	October 7, 2005	Kitt Peak	Spacewatch	EUP	2.4 km	MPC · JPL
828963	2005 UJ_{282}	—	October 26, 2005	Kitt Peak	Spacewatch	·	2.3 km	MPC · JPL
828964	2005 UU_{285}	—	October 26, 2005	Kitt Peak	Spacewatch	·	3.2 km	MPC · JPL
828965	2005 UB_{290}	—	October 26, 2005	Kitt Peak	Spacewatch	·	1.4 km	MPC · JPL
828966	2005 UB_{291}	—	October 26, 2005	Kitt Peak	Spacewatch	(5)	790 m	MPC · JPL
828967	2005 UT_{302}	—	November 11, 2001	Sacramento Peak	SDSS	·	1.0 km	MPC · JPL
828968	2005 UU_{304}	—	October 26, 2005	Kitt Peak	Spacewatch	·	820 m	MPC · JPL
828969	2005 UC_{306}	—	October 27, 2005	Mount Lemmon	Mount Lemmon Survey	·	840 m	MPC · JPL
828970	2005 UK_{317}	—	October 27, 2005	Mount Lemmon	Mount Lemmon Survey	·	1.9 km	MPC · JPL
828971	2005 UA_{321}	—	October 27, 2005	Kitt Peak	Spacewatch	·	1.3 km	MPC · JPL
828972	2005 UY_{330}	—	October 28, 2005	Mount Lemmon	Mount Lemmon Survey	AGN	900 m	MPC · JPL
828973	2005 UL_{337}	—	October 14, 2001	Kitt Peak	Spacewatch	·	1.0 km	MPC · JPL
828974	2005 UZ_{337}	—	October 31, 2005	Kitt Peak	Spacewatch	·	480 m	MPC · JPL
828975	2005 UJ_{344}	—	October 29, 2005	Kitt Peak	Spacewatch	·	2.2 km	MPC · JPL
828976	2005 UU_{351}	—	October 10, 2005	Kitt Peak	Spacewatch	·	960 m	MPC · JPL
828977	2005 UN_{360}	—	October 26, 2005	Kitt Peak	Spacewatch	·	990 m	MPC · JPL
828978	2005 UQ_{361}	—	October 1, 2005	Mount Lemmon	Mount Lemmon Survey	·	1.4 km	MPC · JPL
828979	2005 UG_{362}	—	October 27, 2005	Kitt Peak	Spacewatch	HNS	840 m	MPC · JPL
828980	2005 UM_{362}	—	October 27, 2005	Kitt Peak	Spacewatch	EOS	1.1 km	MPC · JPL
828981	2005 UF_{377}	—	October 27, 2005	Kitt Peak	Spacewatch	·	1.2 km	MPC · JPL
828982	2005 UG_{379}	—	October 29, 2005	Mount Lemmon	Mount Lemmon Survey	EOS	1.4 km	MPC · JPL
828983	2005 UC_{380}	—	October 22, 2005	Kitt Peak	Spacewatch	·	1.1 km	MPC · JPL
828984	2005 UJ_{400}	—	October 26, 2005	Kitt Peak	Spacewatch	·	990 m	MPC · JPL
828985	2005 UY_{402}	—	October 28, 2005	Kitt Peak	Spacewatch	·	1.0 km	MPC · JPL
828986	2005 UA_{404}	—	October 29, 2005	Kitt Peak	Spacewatch	·	720 m	MPC · JPL
828987	2005 UH_{411}	—	October 31, 2005	Mount Lemmon	Mount Lemmon Survey	T_{j} (2.98) · EUP	2.5 km	MPC · JPL
828988	2005 UJ_{411}	—	October 31, 2005	Mount Lemmon	Mount Lemmon Survey	THM	1.7 km	MPC · JPL
828989	2005 UD_{417}	—	October 25, 2005	Kitt Peak	Spacewatch	EUP	3.1 km	MPC · JPL
828990	2005 UW_{417}	—	October 25, 2005	Kitt Peak	Spacewatch	·	1.1 km	MPC · JPL
828991	2005 UT_{419}	—	October 25, 2005	Kitt Peak	Spacewatch	·	1.5 km	MPC · JPL
828992	2005 UX_{420}	—	October 25, 2005	Mount Lemmon	Mount Lemmon Survey	·	830 m	MPC · JPL
828993	2005 UR_{427}	—	October 28, 2005	Kitt Peak	Spacewatch	·	1.9 km	MPC · JPL
828994	2005 UO_{434}	—	October 5, 2005	Kitt Peak	Spacewatch	·	520 m	MPC · JPL
828995	2005 UJ_{450}	—	October 31, 2005	Kitt Peak	Spacewatch	·	540 m	MPC · JPL
828996	2005 UD_{458}	—	October 30, 2005	Kitt Peak	Spacewatch	NYS	770 m	MPC · JPL
828997	2005 UO_{487}	—	September 2, 2005	Palomar	NEAT	·	3.2 km	MPC · JPL
828998	2005 UZ_{524}	—	October 25, 2005	Mauna Kea	P. A. Wiegert, D. D. Balam	·	1.7 km	MPC · JPL
828999	2005 UG_{532}	—	June 23, 2010	WISE	WISE	·	2.0 km	MPC · JPL
829000	2005 UZ_{535}	—	June 16, 2012	Haleakala	Pan-STARRS 1	·	930 m	MPC · JPL

back to top
