= Beta Taurids =

Meteor shower

- Discovery date: 1947
- Parent body: 2P/Encke (Taurid Complex); 2004 TG10

Radiant
- Constellation: Taurus (near Zeta Tauri)

Properties
- Occurs during: June 5 – July 18
- Date of peak: June 28–29
- Zenithal hourly rate: 25 (radar)
- Notable features: Daytime shower

The Beta Taurids (β–Taurids) are an annual meteor shower belonging to a class of "daytime showers" that peak after sunrise. The Beta Taurids are best observed by radar and radio-echo techniques.

The Beta Taurids are normally active from June 5 to July 18. They emanate from an average radiant of right ascension 5h18m, declination +21.2 and exhibit maximum activity around June 28–29 (Solar Longitude=98.3 deg). (Note: The sun has a solar longitude (λ⊙) of 90 degrees on June 21 (Summer solstice) and as there are 365 days/year moves roughly 1 degree/day. The meteor shower radiant of RA=79.4 degrees converts to 5h 18m as each hour is 15 degrees.) The maximum hourly rate typically reaches about 25 as seen on radar. Non-radio observers are faced with a very difficult prospect, because the Beta Taurid radiant is just 10–15 degrees west of the Sun on June 28. (Note: The International Meteor Organization's radiant of 86° +19° will be 10° from the Sun on June 28. Kronk's radiant of 79.4° +21.2° will be 15° from the Sun on June 28.)

These Beta Taurids are the same meteoroid stream as the Taurids (which form a meteor shower in late October). The Earth intersects this stream of debris twice, once in late October and once in late June, forming two separate meteor showers. However, because the October event occurs at night, it is far more visible and better known than the Beta Taurids, which peak during daylight hours.

Asteroids associated with the β–Taurids include 2201 Oljato, 5143 Heracles, 6063 Jason, (8201) 1994 AH2 and 1991 BA.

== Taurid swarm ==
2019 was predicted to be the closest post-perihelion encounter with Earth since 1975. The Taurid swarm was expected to pass 0.06 AU (9,000,000 km; 5,600,000 mi) below the ecliptic between June 23 – July 17.

During 2019 astronomers searched for hypothesized asteroids ~100 meters in diameter from the Taurid swarm between July 5–11, and July 21 – August 10. There were no reports of discoveries of any such objects. There is circumstantial evidence that the daytime June 30 Tunguska event came from the same direction in the sky as the Beta Taurids. The next June close approach to the Taurid swarm is expected in 2036.

== Other daytime June showers ==
During June two other more active daytime meteor showers are known. They are the Zeta Perseids which are also related to Taurid complex and the Arietids which are not related. Both of these showers radiate in roughly the same part of the sky as the Beta Taurids.

== See also ==
- Tunguska event
