= Zeta Perseids =

Meteor shower

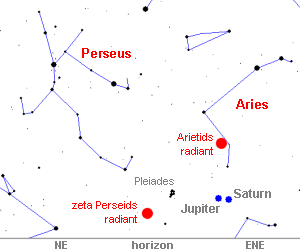
- Appearance of the eastern sky at 5:00 am on June 7, 2000 from a mid-northern latitude observing site.
- Discovery date: 1947
- Parent body: 2P/Encke (Taurid Complex)

Radiant
- Constellation: Perseus
- Right ascension: 04^{h} 12^{m}
- Declination: +26°

Properties
- Occurs during: May 20 – July 5
- Date of peak: June 9–13
- Velocity: 29 km/s
- Zenithal hourly rate: 40 (radar)

The Zeta Perseids (ζ–Perseids) are a daylight meteor shower that takes place from about May 20 to July 5. On the peak date of June 13, the radiant is only 16 degrees from the Sun. The shower was discovered at Jodrell Bank Observatory in 1947 using radio equipment. The Zeta Perseids and Beta Taurids are both probably associated with the Taurid Complex of meteor showers. The Arietids and Zeta Perseids maxima tend to blend into one another.
