= (828534) 2004 TG10 =

Near-Earth asteroid

(828534) 2004 TG_{10}
Discovery
- Discovered by: Spacewatch
- Discovery site: Kitt Peak Obs.
- Discovery date: 8 October 2004 (discovery: first observed only)

Designations
- Minor planet category: NEO · Apollo · PHA

Orbital characteristics
- Epoch 4 September 2017 (JD 2458000.5)
- Uncertainty parameter 0
- Observation arc: 10.16 yr (3,712 days)
- Aphelion: 4.1597 AU
- Perihelion: 0.3086 AU
- Semi-major axis: 2.2341 AU
- Eccentricity: 0.8619
- Orbital period (sidereal): 3.34 yr (1,220 days)
- Mean anomaly: 278.07°
- Mean motion: 0° 17^{m} 42.36^{s} / day
- Inclination: 4.1802°
- Longitude of ascending node: 205.10°
- Argument of perihelion: 317.37°
- Earth MOID: 0.0225 AU · 8.8 LD
- Jupiter MOID: 0.8877 AU

Physical characteristics
- Dimensions: 0.35–0.78 km 1.316±0.605 km
- Geometric albedo: 0.018±0.037
- Absolute magnitude (H): 19.4

(828534) 2004 TG_{10} is an eccentric asteroid, classified as a near-Earth object and potentially hazardous asteroid of the Apollo group. First observed by the Spacewatch survey on 8 October 2004, it may be a fragment of Comet Encke and is the source of the Northern Taurids meteor shower seen annually in November and the June Beta Taurids. The asteroid may be larger than one kilometer in diameter.

== Orbit ==
2004 TG_{10} orbits the Sun at a distance of 0.3–4.2 AU once every 3 years and 4 months (1,220 days). Its orbit has an eccentricity of 0.86 and an inclination of 4° with respect to the ecliptic.

It has an Earth minimum orbital intersection distance of 0.0225 AU (3,370,000 km), which corresponds to 8.8 lunar distances.

== Physical characteristics ==
According to the survey carried out by the NEOWISE mission of NASA's Wide-field Infrared Survey Explorer, the asteroid measures 1.316 kilometers in diameter and its surface has an exceptionally low albedo of 0.018, while Porubcan estimates a diameter of 350 to 780 meters, based on an albedo of 0.25 to 0.05, which typically covers most S-type and C-type asteroids.

TG_{10} compared to Comet Encke
AU	2004 TG_{10}	Encke
Semi-major axis	2.24	2.21
Perihelion	0.313	0.338
Aphelion	4.17	4.09
Eccentricity	0.859	0.847
Longitude of perihelion	162.455°	161.113°
