= 60 Arietis =

Star in the constellation Aries

Observation data Epoch J2000 Equinox ICRS
- Constellation: Aries
- Right ascension: 03^{h} 20^{m} 25.56824^{s}
- Declination: +25° 39′ 45.9220″
- Apparent magnitude (V): 6.142

Characteristics
- Evolutionary stage: giant
- Spectral type: K3 III
- B−V color index: 1.253

Astrometry
Radial velocity (R_{v})	+23.85±0.14 km/s
Proper motion (μ)	RA: +12.102 mas/yr Dec.: −83.013 mas/yr
Parallax (π)	9.5718±0.0488 mas
Distance	341 ± 2 ly (104.5 ± 0.5 pc)
Absolute magnitude (M_{V})	1.34

Details
Mass	1.36 M_{☉}
Radius	11.05+0.40 −0.45 R_{☉}
Luminosity	49.34±0.35 L_{☉}
Surface gravity (log g)	2.4 cgs
Temperature	4,449±34 K
Rotational velocity (v sin i)	2.8 km/s
Age	5.31 Gyr

Other designations
- 60 Ari, BD+25°536, HD 20663, HIP 15557, HR 1000, SAO 75875

Database references
SIMBAD	data

60 Arietis is a star in the northern constellation of Aries. 60 Arietis is the Flamsteed designation. It has an apparent visual magnitude of 6.14, making it a challenge to view with the naked eye. Based upon an annual parallax shift of 9.57±0.05 mas, this star is located 341 light-years (105 parsecs) away from the Sun. It is receding from the Earth with a heliocentric radial velocity of +24 km/s.

This object is an aging giant star with a stellar classification of K3 III, having exhausted the supply of hydrogen at its core and expanded to 11 times the Sun's radius. It is 5.3 billion years old with 1.36 times the mass of the Sun. The star shines with 49 times the Sun's luminosity; this energy is being radiated from the photosphere at an effective temperature of 4,449 K, giving it the orange-hued glow of a K-type star.
