= Taurids =

Annual meteor shower

Southern Taurids (STA)
- Parent body: 2P/Encke

Radiant
- Constellation: Taurus
- Right ascension: 03^{h} 35^{m}
- Declination: +14.4°

Properties
- Occurs during: Sep 23 – Dec 8
- Date of peak: Nov 5
- Velocity: 27.7 km/s
- Zenithal hourly rate: 5

Northern Taurids (NTA)
- Parent body: 2004 TG10

Radiant
- Constellation: Taurus
- Right ascension: 03^{h} 55^{m}
- Declination: +22.8°

Properties
- Occurs during: Oct 13 – Dec 2
- Date of peak: Nov 12
- Velocity: 29 km/s
- Zenithal hourly rate: 5

The Taurids are an annual meteor shower, associated with the comet Encke. The Taurids are actually two separate showers, with a Southern and a Northern component. The Southern Taurids originated from Comet Encke, while the Northern Taurids originated from the asteroid 2004 TG_{10}, possibly a large fragment of Encke due to its similar orbital parameters. They are named after their radiant point in the constellation Taurus, where they are seen to come from in the sky. Because of their occurrence in late October and early November, they are also called Halloween fireballs. Since 2P/Encke is such a short period comet, the meteors have the slowest impact speed of the annual well-known meteor showers.

Comet Encke and the Taurid complex are believed to be remnants of a disrupted 40-km-class comet from about 10,000 years ago, breaking into several pieces and releasing material by normal cometary activity, mass loss via YORP spin-up, or occasionally by close encounters with the tidal force of Earth or other planets (Whipple, 1940; Klačka, 1999). In total, this meteoroid stream is the largest in the inner Solar System. Since the stream is rather spread out in space, Earth takes several weeks to pass through it, causing an extended period of meteor activity, compared with the much briefer periods of activity in other showers. The Taurids are also made up of weightier material, i.e. pebbles as opposed to dust grains. The daytime showers are active from May to July (Beta Taurids and Zeta Perseids), while the nighttime showers are active from September to December.

== Appearance ==
Typically, Taurids appear at a rate of about 5 per hour, moving slowly across the sky at about 28 kilometers per second (17 mi/s), or 100,800 km/h (65,000 mph). If larger than a pebble, these meteors may become bolides as bright as the Moon and leave behind smoke trails.

=== Northern and southern segments ===
Due to the gravitational perturbations of planets, especially Jupiter, the Taurids have spread out over time, allowing separate segments labeled the Northern Taurids (NTA) and Southern Taurids (STA) to become observable. The Southern Taurids are active from about September 23 to December 8, while the Northern Taurids are active from about October 13 to December 2. Essentially these are two cross sections of a single, broad, continuous stream in space.

The Beta Taurids and Zeta Perseids, encountered by the Earth in June/July, are also cross sections of the stream that approach from the Earth's daytime side and, as such, cannot be observed visually in the way the (night-time) Northern and Southern Taurids of October/November can. Astronomers Duncan Steel and Bill Napier even suggest the Beta Taurids could be the cause of the Tunguska event of June 30, 1908.

=== Densities and peaks ===
In 1962 and 1963, the Mars 1 probe recorded one micrometeorite strike every two minutes at altitudes ranging from 6,000 to 40,000 km (3,700 to 24,900 mi) from Earth's surface due to the Taurids meteor shower, and also recorded similar densities at distances from 20 to 40 million km (12 to 25 million mi) from Earth.

The Taurid stream has a cycle of activity that peaks roughly every 2,500 to 3,000 years, when the core of the stream passes nearer to Earth and produces more intense showers. In fact, because of the separate "branches" (night-time in one part of the year and daytime in another; and Northern/Southern in each case) there are two (possibly overlapping) peaks separated by a few centuries, every 3000 years. The next peak is expected around 3000 AD.

The Taurids also have more frequent peaks which may result from a heavier concentration of material in the stream, which only encounter Earth during some passes.

== Fireballs ==
Over Poland in 1995, all-sky cameras imaged an absolute magnitude –17 Taurid bolide that was estimated to be 900 kg and perhaps a meter in diameter.

In 1993, it was predicted that there would be a swarm of activity in 2005. Around Halloween in 2005, many fireballs were witnessed that affected people's night vision. Astronomers have taken to calling these the "Halloween fireballs." During the Southern Taurid meteor shower in 2013, fireball sightings were spotted over southern California, Arizona, Nevada, and Utah. A 2021 study by Ignacio Ferrín and Vincenzo Orofino catalogued 88 probable members of the swarm and showed that many such as the 2212 Hephaistos group and the 169P/NEAT group exhibit cometary activity.

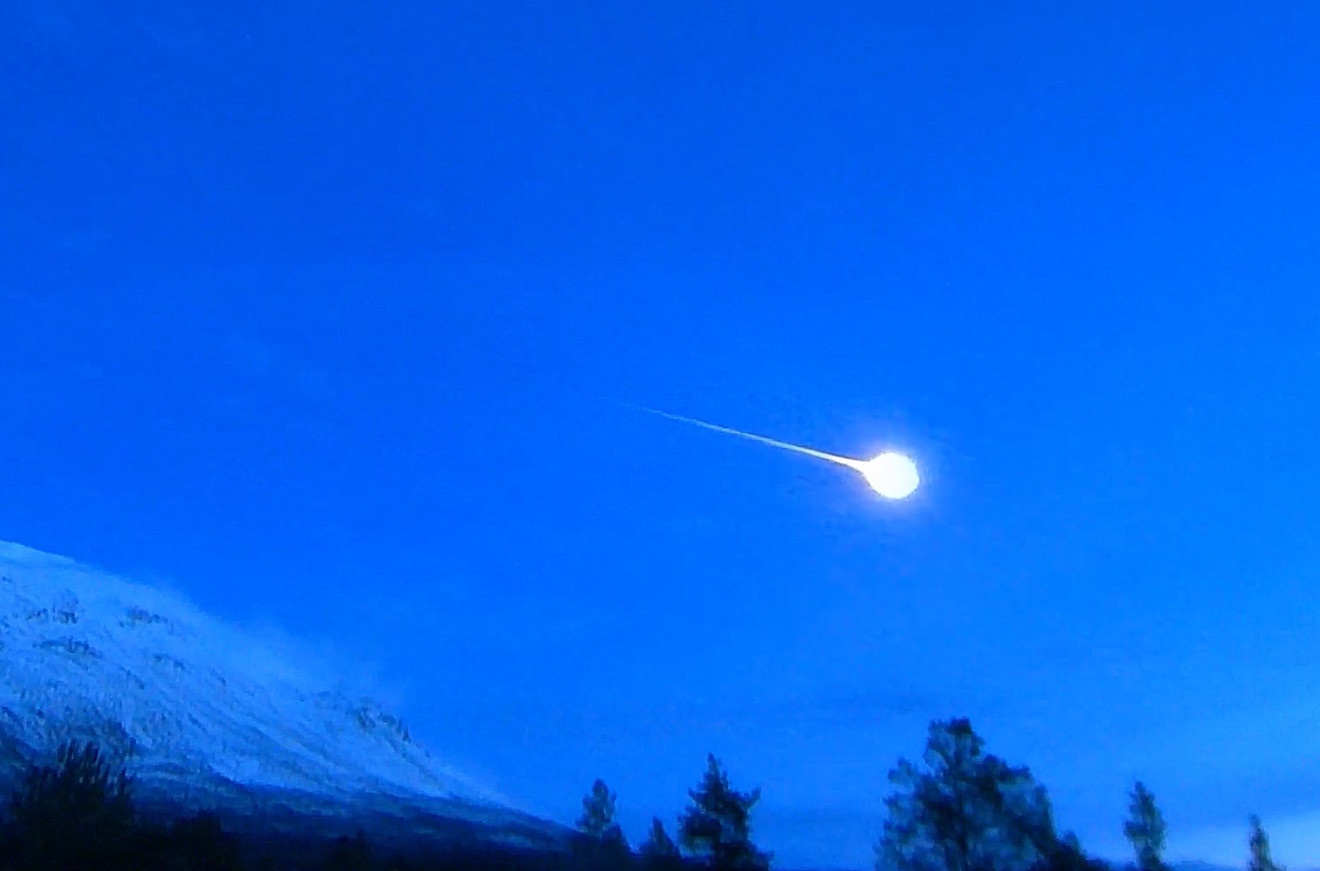
Northern Taurid bolide photographed from Skibotn, Norway December 4, 2020 14:30 CET.

== Meteor impact on the Moon ==
A brief flash of light from a lunar impact event was recorded by NASA scientist Rob Suggs and astronomer Bill Cooke on November 7, 2005, while testing a new 250 mm (10 in) telescope and video camera they had built to monitor the Moon for meteor strikes. After consulting star charts, they concluded that the impact body was likely part of the Taurid meteor shower. This may be the first photographic record of such a strike, which some witnesses claim to have visually observed on rare occasions.
