= Giegerich =

Giegerich is a German surname. Notable people with the name include:

- Ann-Cathrin Giegerich (born 1992), German handball player
- Jill Giegerich (born 1952), American visual artist
- Heinz Giegerich (born 1952), German-born Scottish linguist and professor
- Karin Giegerich (born 1963), German actress
- Thomas Giegerich (born 1959), German jurist
- Wolfgang Giegerich (born 1942), German psychologist

== See also ==
- Gingerich, surname
