= American Meteor Society =

Non-profit scientific organization

- Abbreviation: AMS
- Formation: 1911
- Type: Non-profit
- Legal status: Active
- Location: Geneseo, New York, USA
- Region served: United States
- Official language: English
- Website: www.amsmeteors.org

The American Meteor Society, Ltd. (AMS) is a non-profit scientific organization established to encourage and support the research activities of both amateur and professional astronomers who are interested in the field of meteor astronomy. Its affiliates observe, monitor, collect data on, study, and report on meteors, meteor showers, meteoric fireballs, and related meteoric phenomena.

The society publishes observations and scientific interpretations quarterly in Meteor Trails, The Journal of American Meteor Society. Once per year they give the American Meteor Society Award to a person who has contributed to research on meteors. They also provide an annual research grant to a student of SUNY-Geneseo who has contributed to meteor research or to the AMS.

== History ==
The society was founded in 1911 by Charles P. Olivier of the Leander McCormick Observatory. The initial enrollment was fifteen members. These were recruited by Olivier by letter. The first paper based on the observations of the members appeared in the Astronomical Journal in 1912, describing the η Aquarid meteor shower. In 1926, Olivier began to publish meteor notes from the society on a nearly monthly basis in Popular Astronomy magazine under the title "Monthly Notes". This continued until his editor, Curvin H. Gingrich, died.

Some time before 1932, Olivier appointed regional directors to facilitate the data collection for the society. A director was appointed to the Pacific Northwest region in 1932. Initially this consisted of Washington state and Oregon, but later came to include the western provinces of Canada plus Idaho and Montana. In 1938, the Canadian provinces were withdrawn from the society, while California was added. This western division was headquartered at the University of Oregon in Eugene.

In 1960, Olivier published the first catalogue of hourly meteor rates based upon the data collected by the society members from 1901 to 1958. The second catalogue was published in 1965, which included data up to 1963.

During the late 1970s, David Meisel became Executive Director of the society. Its headquarters were relocated to Geneseo, New York. The society research was expanded to include radio meteor studies, then spectroscopy of meteors.

== See also ==
- International Meteor Organization
- List of astronomical societies
