= Gingerich =

Gingerich is a surname of German origin. Other forms of the name are Gingrich, Gingerick and Gingery and its original form Güngerich, also written Guengerich. In Bern, Switzerland, it was record as early as 1389 and in 1692, it was first recorded among Anabaptists. The first attestation in North America was in Lancaster County, Pennsylvania in 1724. The name is rarely seen in Europe, but was spread in North America by Amish and Mennonite immigrants.

Notable people with the surname include:

- Edward Gingerich (1966–2011), Amish man convicted of manslaughter
- Mose Gingerich (born 1979), Amish-born documentary-maker
- Owen Gingerich (1930-2023), American astronomer
- Philip D. Gingerich (born 1946), American paleontologist

== See also ==
- 2658 Gingerich, main-belt asteroid
- Gingrich, surname
- Giegerich, surname
