= Gingrich =

Gingrich is a surname. For its origin and history see its spelling variant Gingerich. Notable people with the name include:

- Andre Gingrich (born 1952) is an Austrian ethnologist and anthropologist
- Arnold Gingrich (1903–1976), American magazine editor
- Callista Gingrich (born 1966), American performance and production company president and wife of Newt Gingrich
- Candace Gingrich (born 1966), American activist
- Curvin H. Gingrich (1880–1951), American astronomer and magazine editor
- F. Wilbur Gingrich (1901–1993), American biblical scholar
- John E. Gingrich (1897–1960), American United States Navy admiral
- Mauree Gingrich (born 1946), American politician
- Newt Gingrich (born 1943), American politician
