= Francis Alex Tsegah =

Ghanaian diplomat

Amb. Francis Alex Tsegah

Ghana's Ambassador to Spain
- In office 5 October 2004 – 11 April 2009

Personal details
- Spouse: H.E. Genevieve Delali Tsegah
- Education: Europa Institute
- Alma mater: University of Ghana; Harvard Law School; University of Amsterdam; London School of Economics and Political Science
- Profession: Director

Francis Alex Tsegah is a Ghanaian former diplomat and Ambassador of Ghana.

== Early life and education ==
Tsegah attended the University of Ghana where he had his L.L.B and further had his L.L.M from the Harvard Law School. He also went to Europa Institute and also the University of Amsterdam and The London School of Economics and Political Science.

== Career ==
Tsegah has served as Director of the Economic and Investment Bureau. He was also the Director of Personnel and Training. He was also the Chief of Protocol and Director of the Africa and OAU Bureau and also the Director of Policy Planning and Research Department.

In February 2001, he was presented with credential as a Minister-Counselor. In 2002, he was also a Minister (Deputy Chief of Mission).

In 2017, he was a member and Senior Research Fellow at the Ghana Centre for Democratic Development (CDD-Ghana) in Accra.

As at 2022, he is a board member of The West Africa Civil Society Institute (WACSI).

== Ambassadorial role ==
Tsegah was appointed by President John Kufuor as the Ambassador of Ghana to the Kingdom of Spain from 5 October 2004 to 11 April 2009.

== Honour ==
In May 2009, he was awarded by the Spanish government with Spain's Order of the Civil Merit.
