= Genevieve Delali Tsegah =

Ghanaian diplomat

Her Excellency, Ambassador Geneviève Delali Tsegah

Ghana's Ambassador to France
- In office 15 January 2010 – 14 October 2014

Ghana's Ambassador to the Holy See
- In office 2011–2013

Ghana's Deputy Ambassador to the United Nations
- In office January 2011 – October 2014

Personal details
- Spouse: Francis Alex Tsegah
- Education: University of Ghana; University of Nairobi
- Occupation: diplomat

Geneviève Delali Tsegah (born 8 August 1951) is a Ghanaian diplomat.

== Education ==
Tsegah completed a degree in Modern Languages at the University of Ghana in 1976, followed by a degree in International Relations at the University of Nairobi in 1982.

== Career ==
Tsegah joined the diplomatic service in 1977, as a civil servant in the Culture Department of the Ministry of Foreign Affairs, a post she held until 1981. From 1982 to 1983 she was an official in the Middle East and Asia Department, then at the Ministry of Foreign Affairs, until 1985.

In 1988, she took up a post for one year in the department of the Americas, before becoming a member of the Senate in Paris, where she stayed for the next four years. In 1993, she became Deputy Director of the Department for Economics, Trade and Investment, until 1996, when she moved to Cotonou, Benin, where she worked as an adviser and also a business manager from 1997 to 1998.

From 2000 to 2002, she was Head of the Department for Economics, Trade and Investment, before serving for four years as ambassador in Ouagadougou, Burkina Faso (2002–06). She then returned to become director of the Department of Economics, Trade and Investment of the Ministry of Foreign Affairs for two more years.

From 2008 to 2009 she was the representative of the Permanent Representative at the United Nations Headquarters in New York City. In welcoming you to the Vatican and accepting the Letters of Credence by which you are appointed Ambassador Extraordinary and Plenipotentiary of the Republic of Ghana to the Holy See.

From 15 January 2010 to 14 October 2014 she was Ambassador of the Republic of Ghana to France. At the same time she was also accredited to UNESCO and the Holy See.

She is married to fellow Ghanaian diplomat H.E. Francis Alex Tsegah, who served as the first Ambassador of Ghana to the Kingdom of Spain from 2004 to 2009.
