= Germania Bank Building (St. Paul) =

- U.S. National Register of Historic Places
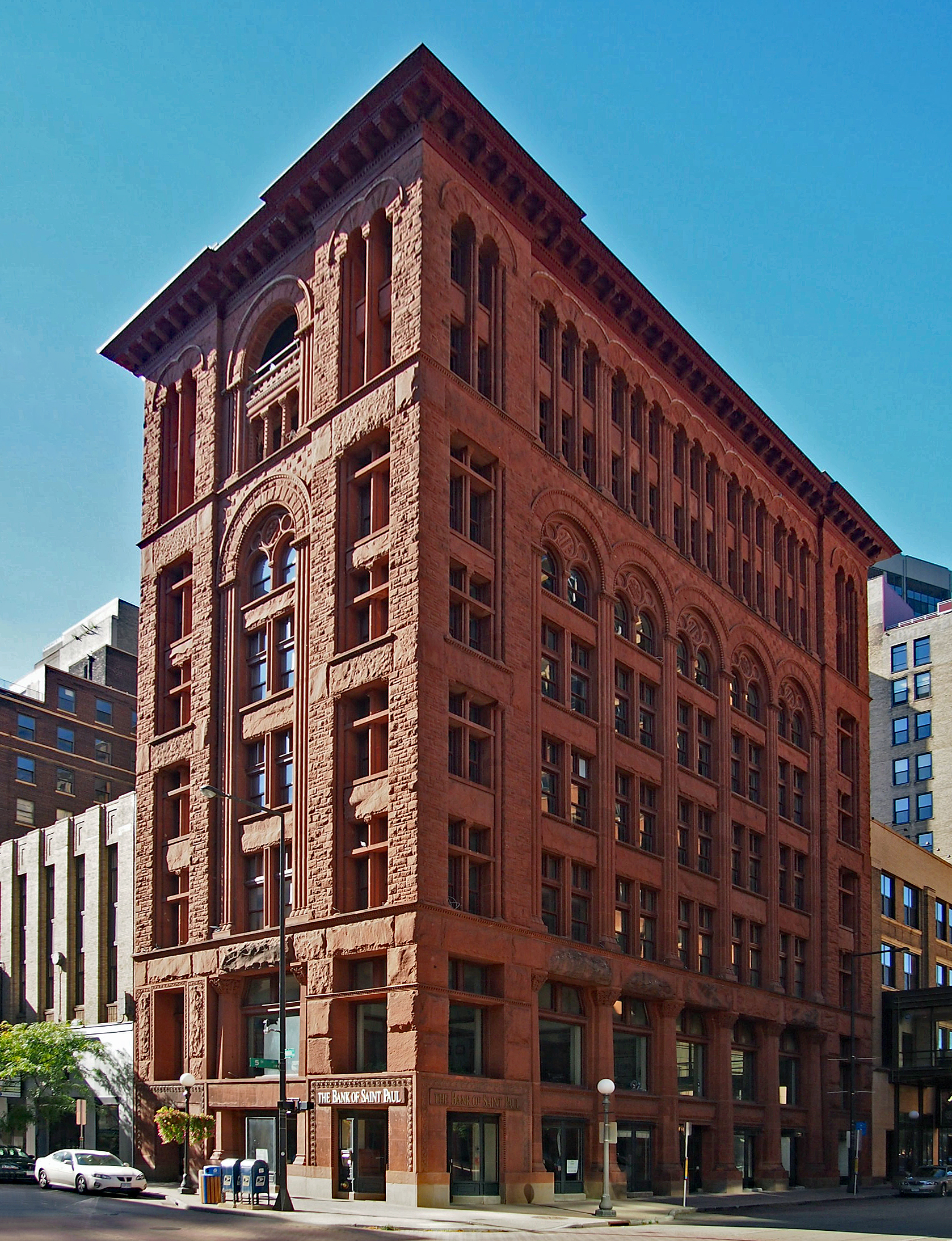
- The Germania Bank Building viewed from the north

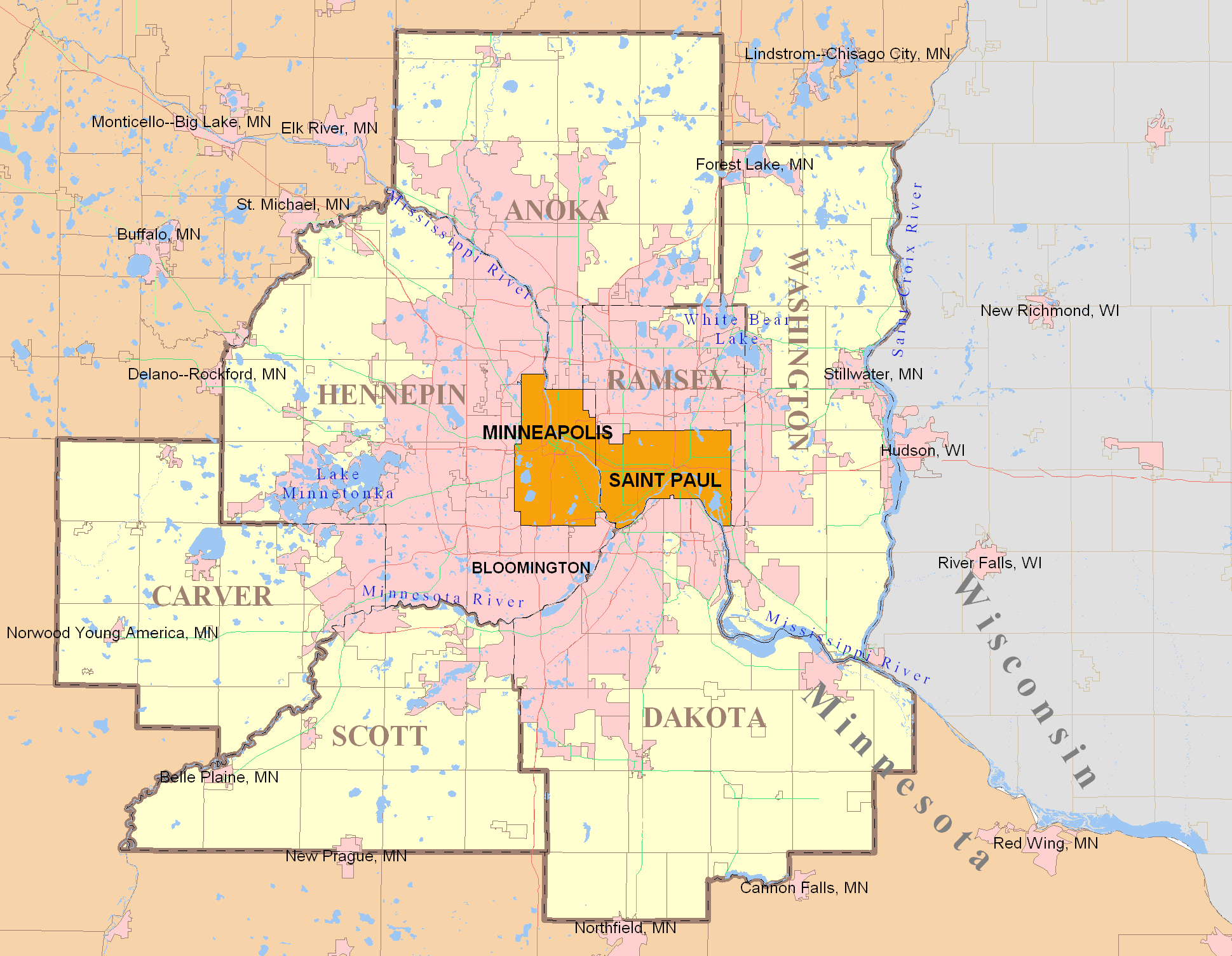
- Location within Minneapolis–Saint Paul Location within Minnesota Location within the United States
- Location: 6 5th Street W., Saint Paul, Minnesota
- Coordinates: 44°56′43.5″N 93°5′41″W
- Area: Less than one acre
- Built: 1889
- Built by: Lauer Brothers
- Architect: J. Walter Stevens (architect), Harvey Ellis (designer)
- Architectural style: Richardsonian Romanesque/Renaissance Revival
- NRHP reference No.: 77000764
- Designated: December 6, 1977

The Germania Bank Building, later renamed the St. Paul Building, is a historic office building in downtown Saint Paul, Minnesota, United States. It was built in 1889. It was listed on the National Register of Historic Places in 1977 for its local significance in the theme of architecture. It was nominated for being Saint Paul's only surviving brownstone high-rise.

== Origin ==
Minnesota's young capital city was booming when the Germania Bank was chartered in Saint Paul in 1884, with Alexander Ramsey as its president. The corner of Fifth and Wabasha Streets was a prime downtown location, and a design competition was held for the new building. From the eleven entries received, judges chose the design submitted by J. Walter Stevens, architect of several elegant Summit Avenue homes and Lowertown warehouses.

Like many pioneer architects, Stevens' only training had been a few years as an apprentice in his father's office. But he became successful with the help of talented draftsmen who moved from city to city, following the money to construct their elaborate designs. Harvey Ellis, one of the finest architectural artists of the period, worked sporadically for Stevens after arriving in the city in 1886. Based on the evidence, some architectural historians believe that Ellis worked on the winning entry. In a "sketch for interior of a bank by Harvey Ellis", published in Western Architect in 1904, J. Walter Stevens is identified as the architect. The Germania Bank Building is the only bank Stevens is known to have designed.

An unsigned pen-and-ink rendering of the Germania Bank, dated 1888, was reproduced in American Architect in 1892. The design is a hybrid of the popular Richardsonian Romanesque style, incorporating an Italian Renaissance revival top story. This transitional style was becoming popular in Boston and Chicago, contributing to the evidence that the wandering Ellis helped design it.

At eight stories, the building was much taller than its neighbors. Three other multi-story office buildings, however, were built downtown that year—of brick. Germania Bank was the last high-rise brownstone.

== Design ==
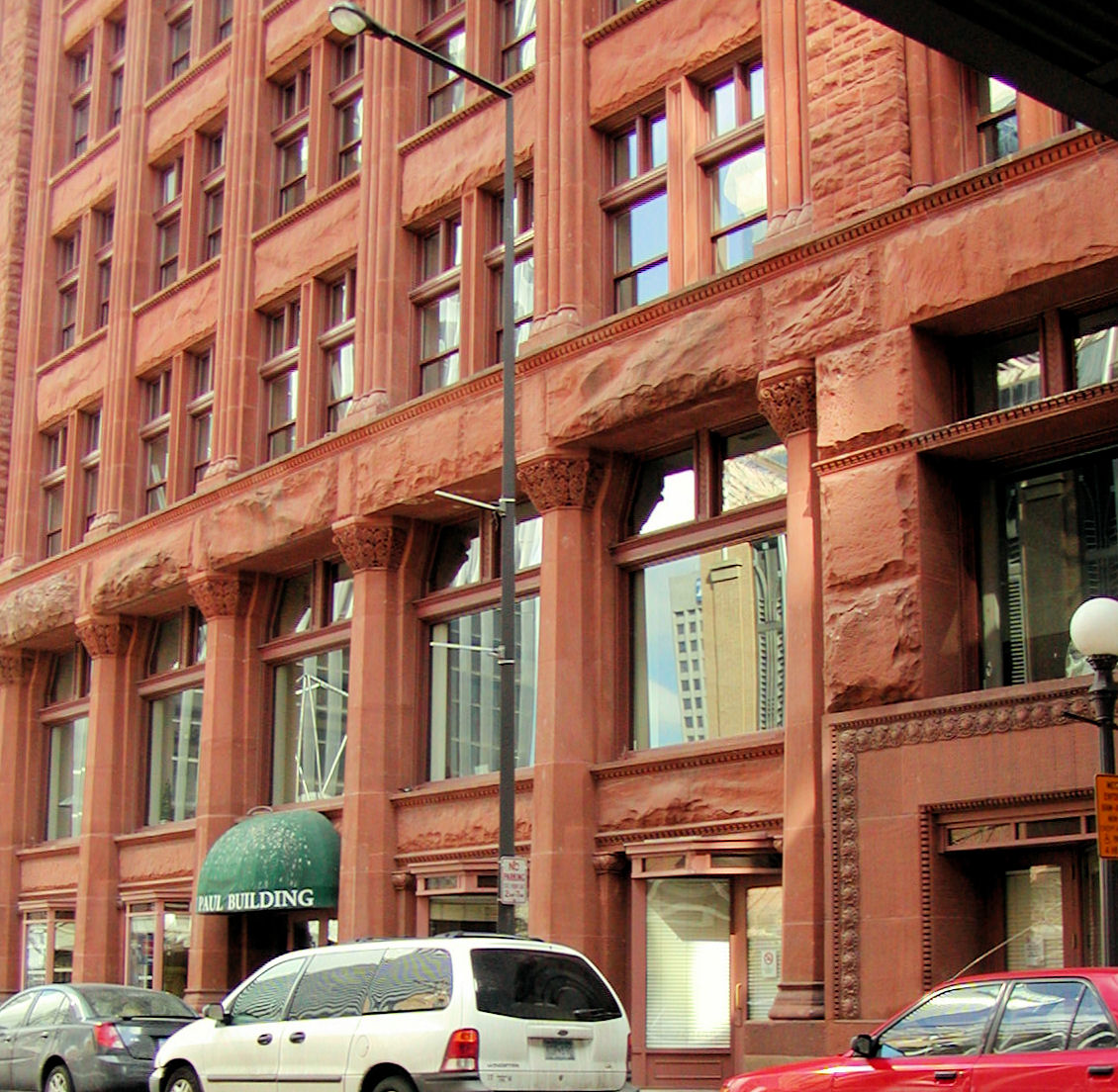
Detail of the street level

The building's cavernous entries and windows are supported by Roman arches in massive walls of rusticated red Lake Superior Sandstone. Stonemasons carved fanciful designs into the soft sandstone columns as well as the window and door trim. The upper third of the façade features a multicolored checkerboard pattern and colonettes inspired by an Italian palazzo. Built by Lauer Brothers, the structure's final cost was more than $165,000 (equivalent to $5,912,500 in 2025).

The bank occupied the entire second floor, which featured a coffered wooden ceiling, intricately carved moldings and recessed arches, marble floors, and ornate iron grillwork at the tellers' windows.

== Use ==
Only ten years after constructing their headquarters, the Germania Bank was forced to liquidate. By 1902, the former bank had become the Ernst Building, taking the name of its new owner, Caspar Ernst. Five years later it was renamed the Pittsburgh Building, perhaps because Penn Mutual Life Insurance held the note on the mortgage. The building became known as the St. Paul Building in 1934.

Office tenants have included doctors, dentists, lawyers, and a dressmaker as well as the Pinkerton National Detective Agency. In the early 1890s, Frederick Weyerhaeuser moved his family and timber business from Wisconsin to St. Paul and opened his office here. Shops selling books, gloves, jewelry, cigars, candy, and shoes have occupied the street-level storefronts.

According to historian David Page, F. Scott Fitzgerald may have rented a writing room in the building in the winter of 1921. On that visit home—his last—Fitzgerald kept the location a secret so he could write undisturbed. Soon, he started writing the short stories that would evolve into The Great Gatsby.

== Later history ==
Many of the bank's design elements were lost to remodeling over the years, including after World War II, when the storefronts were modernized to attract trend-conscious customers. In 1977, however, the structure was listed on the National Register of Historic Places. In the mid-1980s, its storefronts were restored to their original 19th-century appearance.

== See also ==
- National Register of Historic Places listings in Ramsey County, Minnesota
