= Harvey Ellis =

American architect and artist

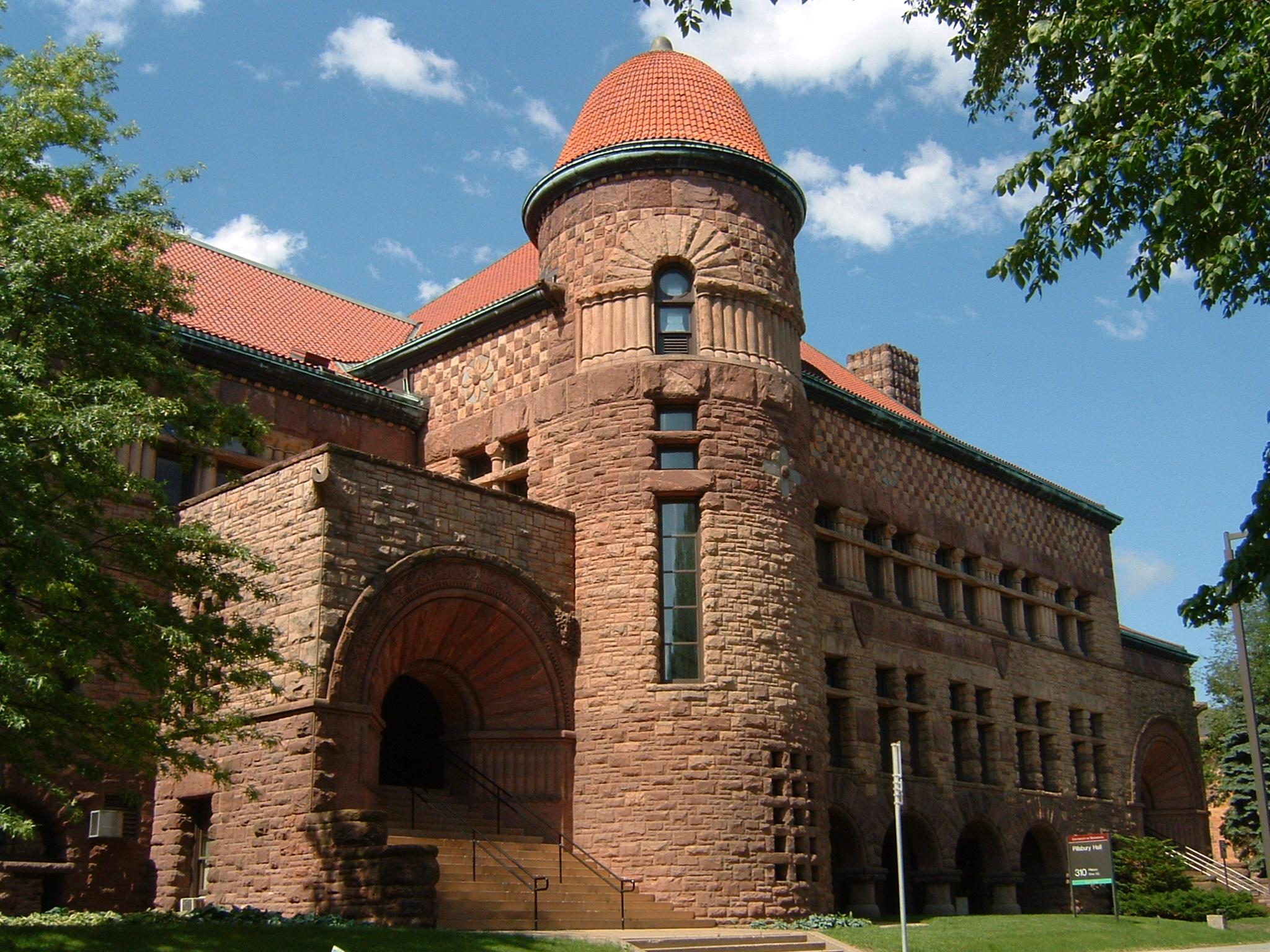
Pillsbury Hall, University of Minnesota, Minneapolis, Minnesota

Harvey Ellis (October 17, 1852, in Rochester, New York – January 2, 1904, in Syracuse, New York) was an American architect, perspective renderer, painter and furniture designer. He worked in Rochester, New York; Utica, New York; St. Paul, Minnesota; Minneapolis, Minnesota; St. Joseph, Missouri; St. Louis, Missouri and Syracuse, New York.

== Early life in Rochester ==
Ellis was born in Rochester on October 17, 1852, the oldest of four sons of Dewitt and Eliza Haseltine Ellis. Childhood drawings suggest an unusual artistic aptitude. After public grade school and, for a while, a private high school academy in Rochester, Ellis entered the United States Military Academy at West Point in 1871 but was among the first-year cadets discharged after seven months for academic insufficiency, in his case in French and mathematics.

During the next five years, Ellis moved about between Albany and Rochester in New York state. Documentation of this phase of his life is scarce. Family correspondence reveals that in New York in 1875 he supported himself by working part-time as a draftsman in an engineering firm. He is thought to have studied painting with Edwin White and architecture with Arthur Gilman; although plausible, these claims have resisted verification. It also has been said that he worked for Henry Hobson Richardson; however, that is unlikely. Ellis made no such assertion, and there is no record of him in Richardson's archives.

In 1877, Ellis, by then an artist with maturing skills, returned to Rochester where he became one of the founders of the Rochester Art Club. In 1879 while simultaneously functioning as an artist, art teacher and active club member, he and his brother Charles established the architectural firm of H. and C. S. Ellis. Charles was adept at soliciting business, some of it through family connections, while Harvey did the designing. He was briefly assisted by a well paid non-family employee, Havelock E. Hand. During the next six years, the firm produced many Queen Anne residential, commercial and civic buildings. Most of them disappeared as Rochester expanded, and today little is known about them except their names and original locations. A popular but erroneous belief is that Harvey also designed the United States Court House and Post Office in Rochester, that serves as Rochester City Hall. Extensive documentation in the National Archives reveals that this building, like other government structures throughout the country at this time, was designed in the Office of the Supervising Architect of the United States Treasury.

There are biographical gaps for parts of 1885 and 1886. Newspaper accounts of his testimony as a witness in a jury trial, in which Charles was the defendant, place Harvey still in Rochester in early 1885, but that autumn he submitted an entry for a competition for a monument for General Ulysses Grant from Utica, New York. It won first prize and publication in the nationally circulated American Architect and Building News. Several plein air watercolor sketches, identified in his hand as sites in France and dated with just the year 1885, imply a European trip. Census records reveal that he married that year. Speculation leads to a question: could a trip to France in 1885 have been a wedding trip with his bride as well as a sketching trip for him? His competition design is often described as Richardsonian, but it likely also reflected his personal responses to certain medieval buildings that he could have seen in France.

== Midwestern years ==
The city directory for St. Paul, Minnesota, places him thereby, at the latest, mid-1886, the first stop in what would become a seven-year midwestern odyssey. He first worked for Charles Mould, replacing Mould's departing chief draftsman, H. E. Hand, transposed initials notwithstanding presumably, the same well paid draftsman who previously had worked for the Ellises in Rochester. Perhaps he was the link between Rochester and the Midwest. Ellis's work for Mould is unknown. Signed and dated perspective renderings place him later that year in the office of J. Walter Stevens, for whom, among other projects, he produced an entry for the Detroit Museum of Fine Arts competition.

Ellis has often been viewed as a midwestern journeyman draftsman, no different from others in the band of able but lowly paid draftsmen who moved in the Midwest from office to office, from city to city, wherever there was work, content to collect their pay at the end of the week. Decades later they were called journeymen draftsmen. Ellis did indeed move often during this phase of his life, but he was not just one of the journeymen draftsmen. By the time he arrived in St. Paul, he had become an acclaimed artist and a leading figure in the arts community of Rochester; for six years he had been a principal in a successful architectural firm in Rochester; and he had won a national architectural design competition. Each time he moved in the Midwest there was an important design competition in the offing in the city to which he migrated. Architectural firms seemingly sought his services, paid him significantly more than other employees; and with each move he traded up in terms of professional opportunity.

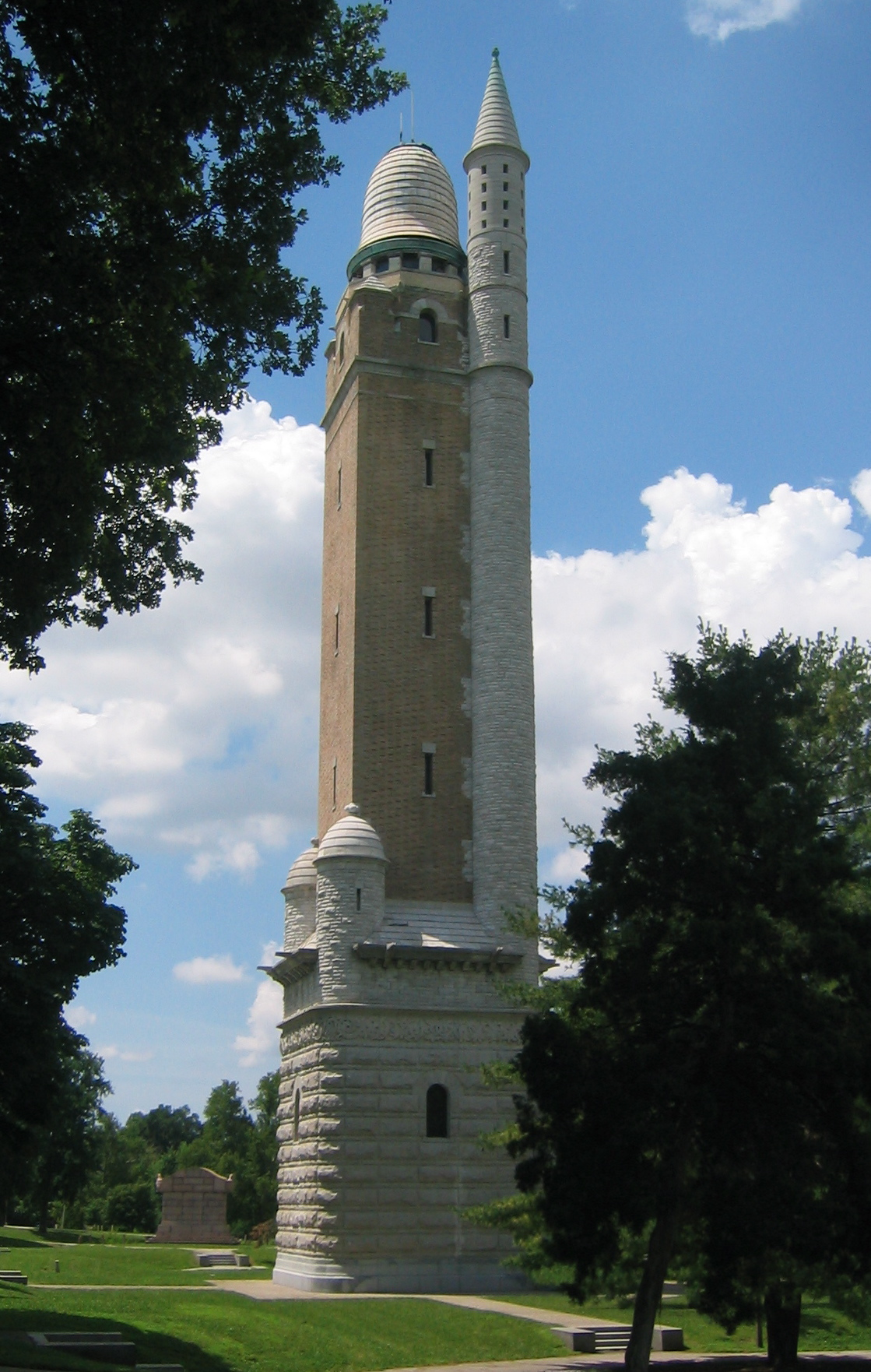
The Compton Hill Water Tower built in 1898 in St. Louis

In 1887 Ellis began to work in Minneapolis as chief draftsman for Leroy Sunderland Buffington who then had the largest architectural office in the state. Possibly Buffington recruited him to produce the entry that year for the Minneapolis City Hall and Hennepin County Court House competition. For unknown reasons Ellis's design was never submitted. In 1887 and 1888 Ellis designed numerous houses, commercial buildings and miscellaneous projects for Buffington. Most were his versions of Richardsonian Romanesque forms, but there also were small, attractive simple frame structures. He often has been credited with the design of Buffington's well known twenty-eight story iron-frame skyscraper, but that project more likely preceded Ellis's arrival and was the work of someone else, not yet identified, among Buffington's staff of more than thirty employees. In 1888 or 1889 the Mabel Tainter Memorial Building in Menomonie, Wisconsin was designed, in the style of Richardsonian Romanesque. Ellis is often credited with this design, but this is questioned by some sources, who claim instead that it was the work of Edgar Eugene Joralemon. In 1889 Ellis worked briefly for the then thriving partnership of G. W. and F. D. Orff. Richardsonianism lingers, but several designs for the Orffs also herald new, uniquely Ellisonian paths that will reappear in some of his forthcoming Missouri designs.

For each of his designs, Ellis made a so-called show drawing, usually a technically dazzling pen-and-ink perspective rendering, which Buffington and other employers submitted to the weekly American Architect and Building News and, sometimes, the monthly Inland Architect. Since few of these designs were built, fewer still stand today, and many of Ellis's original renderings have disappeared, the published renderings provide a trail of his evolution as a designer. Because his beautiful renderings appeared in widely disseminated magazines, Ellis quickly became one of the most influential perspective renderers in the country, and both his architectural and drawing mannerisms were soon imitated by dozens of other architects and delineators. Some of their work was signed, some was not, and decades later some of it was mistakenly attributed to Ellis. The concept that Ellis deliberately shunned professional acclaim by producing anonymous or pseudonymous work allowed such attributions. Separating the work of other delineators from that of Ellis is facilitated by the sometimes overlooked fact that, with but very few exceptions, Ellis signed his renderings just as he signed his paintings. Connoisseurship also helps. Ellis was proud of his achievements and with his signature claimed his rightful place in the world of architecture and painting.

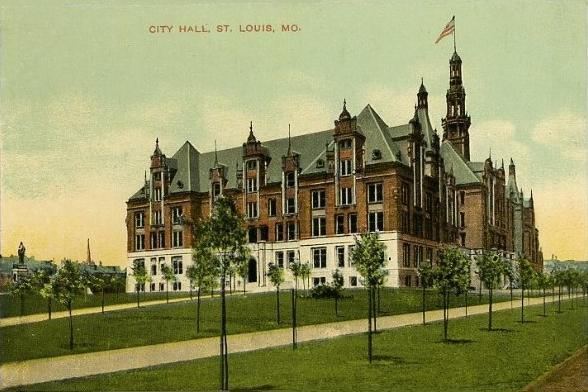
St. Louis City Hall, built in 1904

By mid-1889 Ellis had joined the firm of Eckel and Mann in St. Joseph, Missouri, as its most highly paid employee. He produced a few Richardsonian projects, but Chateauesque forms also soon appeared. His most important project was the Chateauesque design for the 1890 St. Louis City Hall competition, which won the first prize and the job for the firm. In early 1891 George Mann moved to St. Louis to oversee construction of the city hall, and he also established a solo practice there. Later that year, after a brief time back in Minneapolis, where he produced a Beaux-Arts library design for Buffington, Ellis joined Mann in St. Louis. Certain projects continued in the Chateauesque vein, but Beaux-Arts forms and details soon became more prevalent. His projects for the ephemeral firm of Randall, Ellis and Baker reverted to a Richardsonian mode, rather outdated by then.

== Later life in Rochester ==
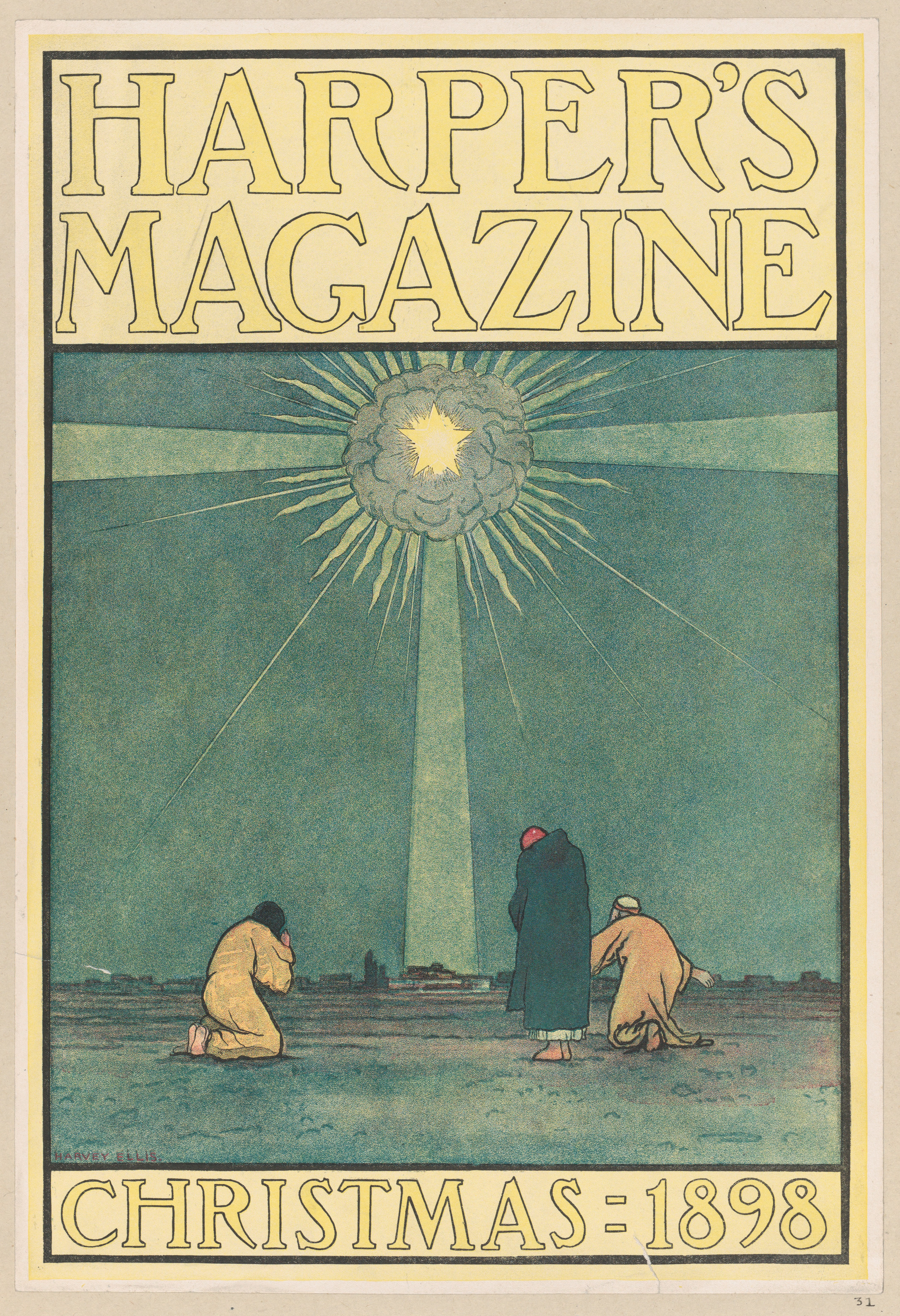
Harper's Magazine Christmas poster, 1898

As the economic Panic of 1893 swiftly enveloped the country, architectural offices in Missouri and everywhere else were diminished or closed, and that year Ellis's midwestern sojourn ended. He returned to Rochester and the practice his brother had maintained that then became known as Charles S. Ellis and Harvey Ellis, Architects. Most of their commissions at this time apparently were similar to the kinds of modest projects that they had started with sixteen years earlier. Their names are known, but there is little visual information about them. Painting and graphic design, not architecture, became Ellis's main intellectual focus after he returned to Rochester. His technical skills enabled him to master different pictorial modes of the day: traditional generic illusionism, Tonalism, Japonism, the more abstract precepts of Arthur Wesley Dow and, via Dow, the avant-garde art of Paul Gauguin. In 1897 several of Ellis's architectural designs began to reflect English Arts and Crafts architectural trends, and that same year he was one of the founders of the Rochester Arts and Crafts Society, apparently the first such organization in the country. For the rest of his life he was immersed in the American Arts and Crafts movement.

== Syracuse and The Craftsman ==
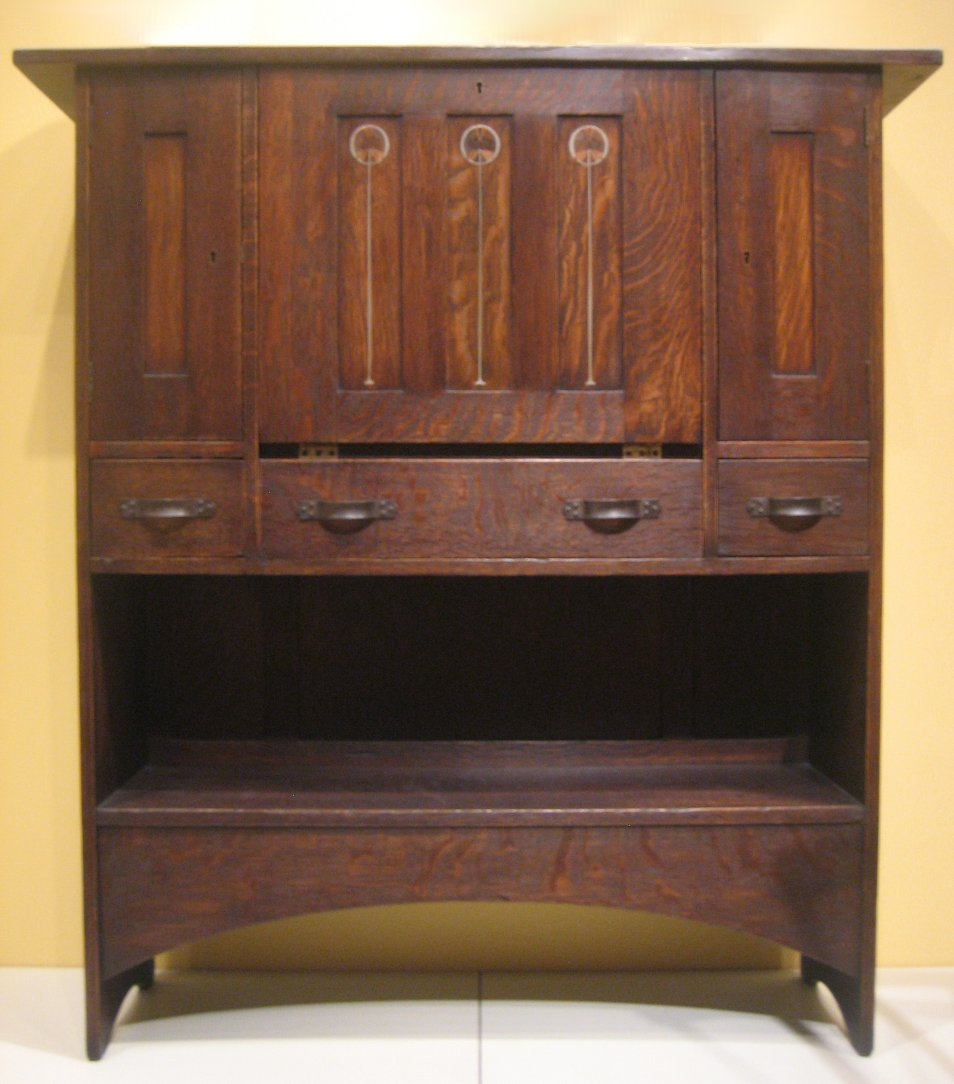
Craftsman oak desk, c.1904

Ellis's path and that of Gustav Stickley, the de facto leader of the American movement, eventually crossed, for Ellis, the president of the society, was in charge of installing Stickley's famous large 1903 Arts and Crafts exhibition in its Rochester venue, the Mechanics Institute. Shortly after that Ellis moved to Syracuse, New York, to join the expanding architecture department of Stickley's United Crafts organization. Unsigned illustrations that appear in Stickley's Craftsman magazine during the last half of 1903 have sometimes been attributed to Ellis. However, just six complete architectural designs (five were signed and one was unsigned); two signed projects that reside more in the realm of interior decoration than architecture per se; and one architectural essay devoid of illustrations were actually his work. Two of his paintings also appeared as Craftsman frontispieces. Ellis depicted furniture in the interior perspectives and elevations of his Craftsman residential designs, just as he had done in other situations, years earlier for Buffington for example. His intention was to demonstrate total aesthetic harmony between architecture and appropriate furnishings. There has never been a suggestion, then or now, that he designed the furniture he depicted for Buffington; however, long after their publication, his Craftsman renderings began to be interpreted to mean that he designed the furniture as well as drew it. This idea overlooked the fact that Ellis had no experience as a furniture designer and had been hired to work in the architecture department. The lightly scaled furniture in most of his illustrations, which differed significantly from the massive items previously often seen in The Craftsman, reflected newer design trends that Stickley began to promote after his Arts and Crafts exhibition. It was more likely designed by employees in his furniture department, such as LaMont Warner, for example, who responded to items Stickley had collected for the exhibition.

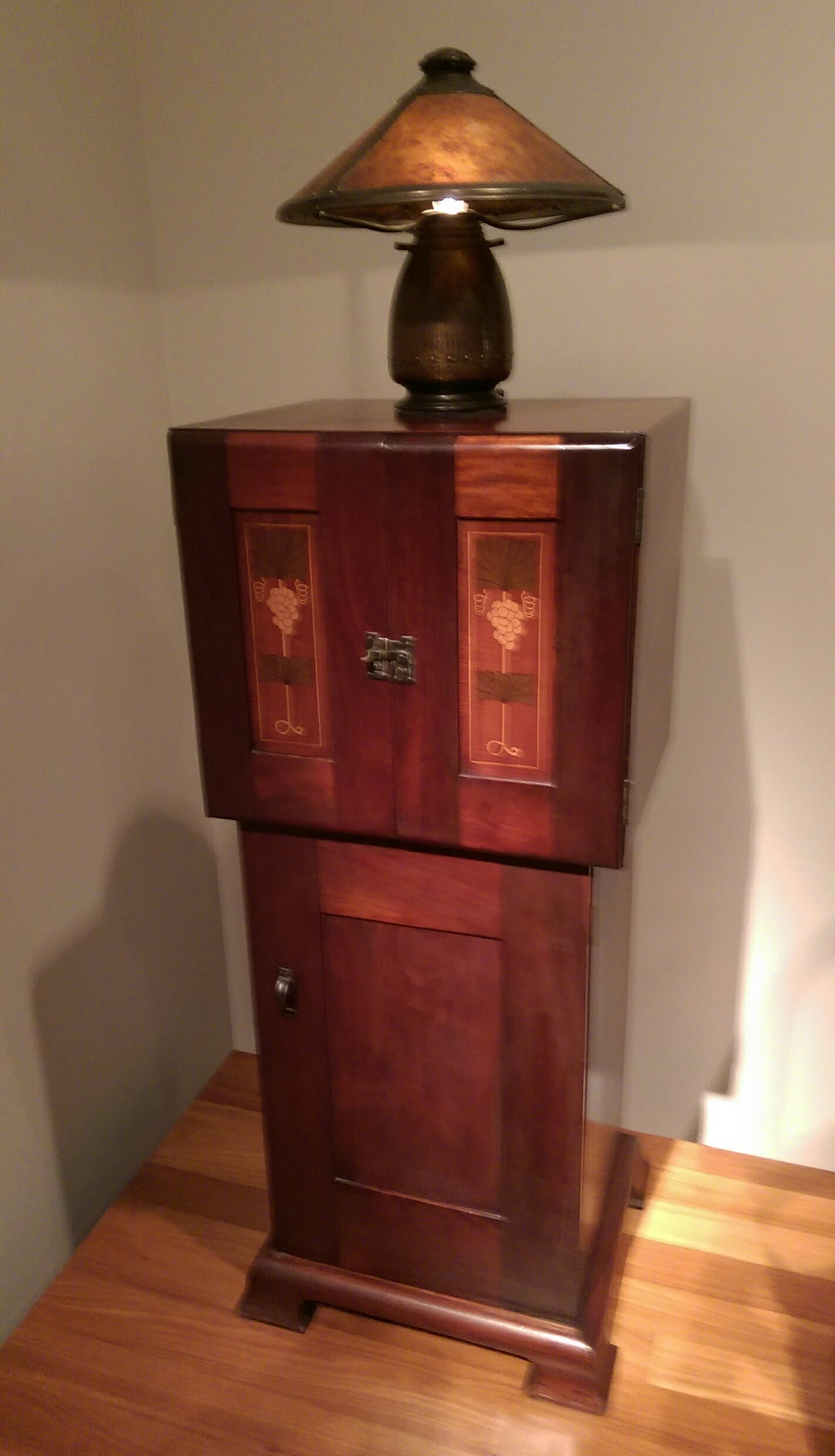
A mahogany music cabinet with maple inlays designed by Harvey Ellis and built by Craftsman Workshops, approximately 1903. The lamp was made by Old Mission Kopper Kraft. On display at the de Young Museum in San Francisco.

In contrast to this explanation are the comments of appraiser John Solo on Antiques Roadshow in 2011. Describing a sheet music cabinet, Solo said,

"This piece is a very exciting piece of furniture. It was done by Gustav Stickley. It's a very early Gustav Stickley stamp, about 1903, 1904, right in there. But what's really interesting about this piece of furniture, what really is exciting about this piece of furniture, is the fact that it was designed by Harvey Ellis. And Harvey Ellis only worked for Gustav Stickley for about seven or eight months. He died in 1904, and this is one of the pieces that he produced. It has everything going on with it that you would like in a piece of Gustav Stickley- Harvey Ellis furniture."

The view of Ellis as designing the "golden age" of Stickley furniture is widespread. During Ellis' tenure, Craftsman designs showed a "lighter note" than later "blunt, straightforward, and unadorned" pieces after his death. A signature feature of the Ellis period is the use of purely decorative inlays, that disappear afterwards. He also introduced curved lower edges to horizontal rails that visually lightened Stickley's earlier designs. This "light touch" has been described as the influence of both Voysey and Mackintosh.

His time with Stickley was brief, for just seven months after moving to Syracuse, Ellis died there on January 2, 1904, of heart disease, three months after his fifty-first birthday. A convert to Roman Catholicism, he was buried in an unmarked grave in St. Agnes Cemetery in Syracuse. In 1997 the Arts and Crafts Society of Central New York honored him with a simple, dignified granite marker for his grave bearing his name, a Latin cross and the word Architect.

== Representative selection of work ==
Buildings marked "NRHP" are on the National Register of Historic Places:

Architectural designs for H. and C S. Ellis

- Asakel Kendrick house, Rochester, 1879
- Henry Ellsworth house, Rochester, 1882
- Frank Smith house, Angelica, New York, 1883
- Lamberton house, Rochester, 1884 NRHP
- Grace Episcopal Church, Scottsville, New York, 1885

Architectural designs for J. Walter Stevens

- Stevens house, projects, 1886
- West Publishing Company, St. Paul, 1886
- Goodsell Observatory, Carleton College, Northfield, Minnesota, 1886 NRHP
- Detroit Museum of Fine Arts competition entry, project, 1887
- Germania Bank Building, St. Paul, 1889 NRHP

Architectural designs for Leroy S. Buffington

- S. C. Gale house, Minneapolis, 1887
- Pillsbury Hall and Nicholson Hall within the University of Minnesota Old Campus Historic District, Minneapolis, 1887 NRHP
- F. B. Hart house, Minneapolis, 1887
- Dormitory, State Experimental Farm School, University of Minnesota, St. Paul, project, 1887
- Wilsten house, Lynchburg, West Virginia, project, 1888
- Minneapolis City Hall and Hennepin County Court House competition entry, late 1887 or early 1888
- Office buildings, projects, 1887
- Library, project, 1891

Architectural designs for G. W. and F. D. Orff

- J. F. Collum house, project, 1889
- Henry James Tenement, project, 1889

Architectural designs for Eckel and Mann

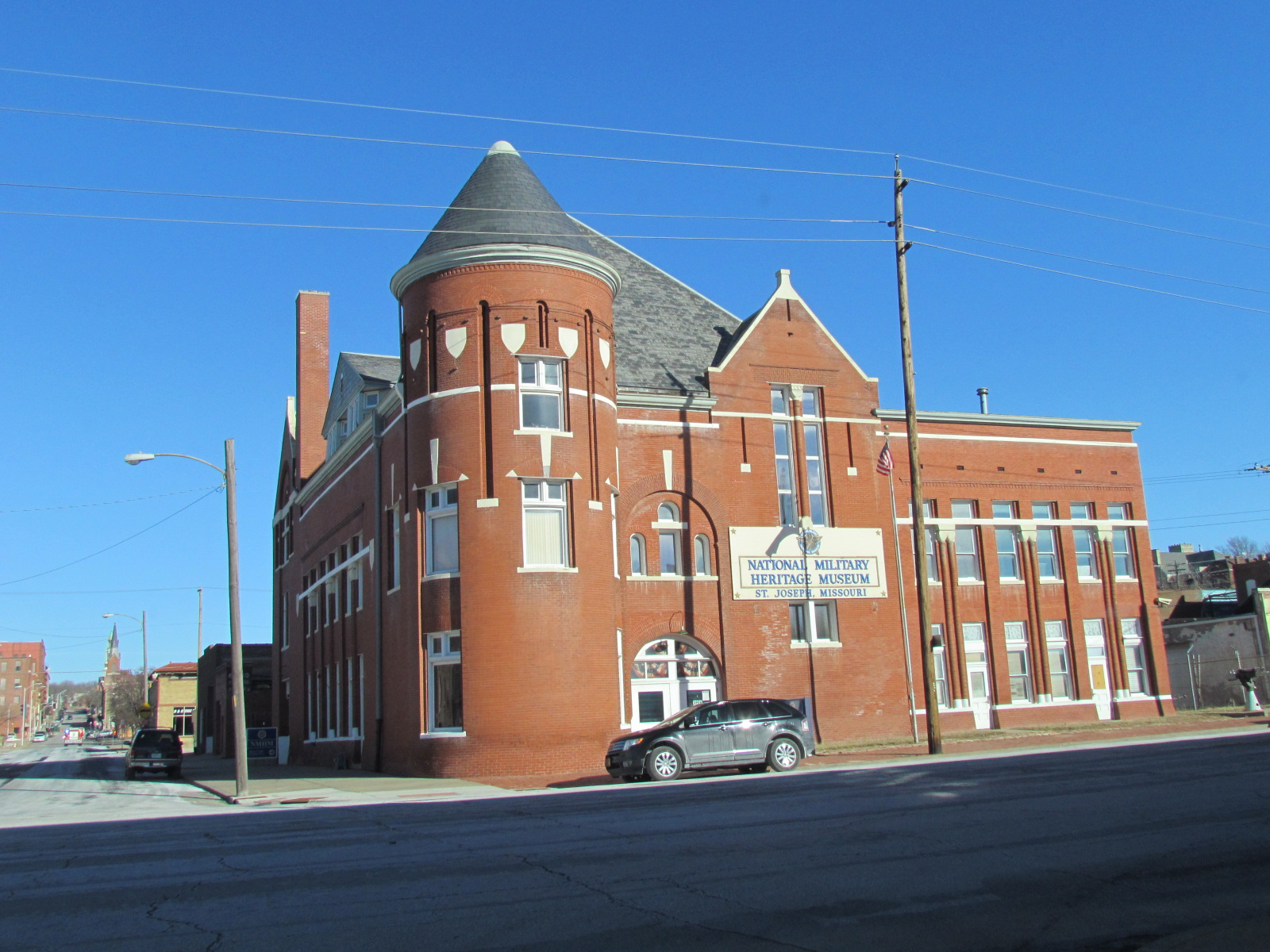
Central Police Station (National Military Heritage Museum)

- S. M. Nave house, project, 1889
- J. W. McAlister house, St. Joseph, 1889
- A. J. B. Moss house, St. Joseph, 1889
- J. D. McNeely Residence, St. Joseph, 1889
- Central Police Station (National Military Heritage Museum), St. Joseph, 1890
- Burnes family mausoleum, project, 1889
- St. Louis City Hall competition entry, St. Louis, 1890

Architectural designs for George Mann

- St. Louis Union Station competition entry, project, 1891
- St. Vincent's Hospital, St. Louis, Missouri, 1891 NRHP
- Mercantile Club, project, 1891
- Columbia club, project, 1891
- George Mann house, project, 1892
- Fout houses, project, 1892
- Entrance to Fout Place, project, 1892
- Entrances to Bell Place, project, 1893

Architectural designs for Randall, Ellis and Baker

- Gatehouse for a park, project, 1892
- Fraternal building, project, 1892

Architectural designs for Charles S. and Harvey Ellis, Architects

- Louis J. Slimmer house, Clarkesville, Iowa, 1894
- Woodworth Building, Rochester, 1894
- James Cunningham, Sons and Company, factory addition, Rochester, 1899
- Joseph Cunningham house, library, project, 1900
- Plaster house, project, 1901,
- Pierre Purcell house, project, 1901

Architectural designs for The Craftsman

- Craftsman house, project, 1903
- Adirondack camp, project, 1903
- Child's Bedroom, project, 1903
- Urban house, project, 1903
- Puss in Boots decoration for a child's bedroom, project, 1903
- Summer chapel, project, 1903
- House in "A Note of Color", project, 1903
- Bungalow, project, 1903

Pictorial art: paintings, drawings and graphic designs

- Minstrel show musicians, pencil and crayon, about 1858
- Christ Church, Oxford, pencil drawing, signed March 12, 1869
- Interior of a Room at 'Congress Hall', watercolor, signed January 26, 1877
- Reading the Bible, Old Chelsea Church, London, A.D. 1270, oil, signed 1878
- Star in the East, oil, signed 1877
- Orpheus, pencil, 1884
- Sommerville Pier and Lighthouse, watercolor, signed 1884
- Pitching Hay, watercolor, signed 1884
- Harbor at Sunset. watercolor, signed 1894
- Cows in a Hazy Landscape, watercolor, signed 1894
- Untitled urban scene along a canal, watercolor, signed 1894
- Joan of Arc, watercolor and pastel, signed 1894
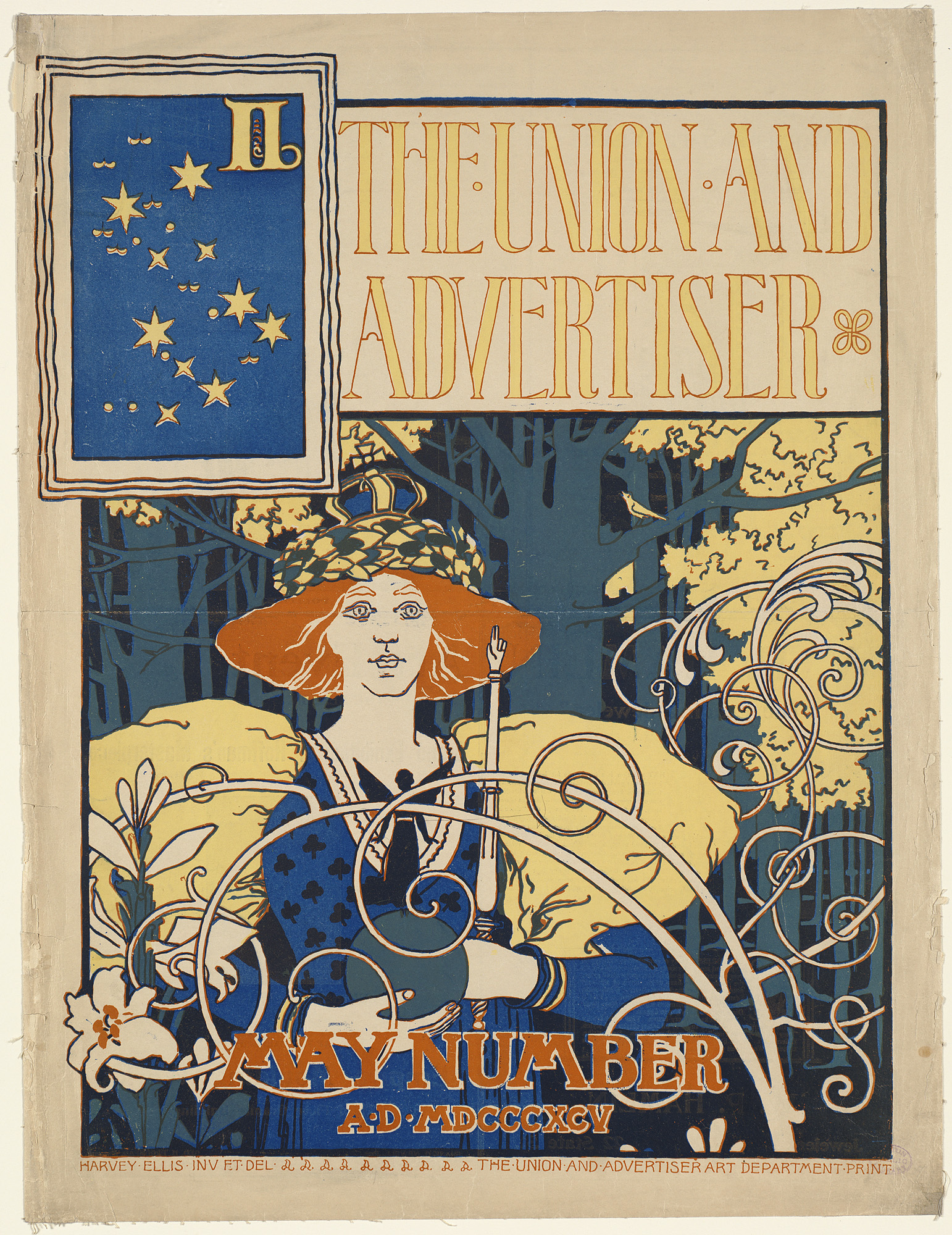
- The Union and Advertiser poster, May 1897
  Cover for the Rochester Union and Advertiser, watercolor, signed 1895
- The Old Mill, watercolor, signed 1896
- Burning Brush, watercolor, 1896
- Fishermen at the Canal Lock, watercolor and pastel, signed 1896
- Poster for the Third National Cycle Exhibition, watercolor, 1897
- Pallas Athena Leading the Ships of the Argonauts, watercolor, signed 1898
- The Hourglass, watercolor, signed 1898
- Silhouettes, watercolor, signed 1899
- Night Study of the New York Central and Hudson River Railroad Station, watercolor, signed 1899
- Evening, pastel, signed 1899
- Illustration for 'The Cricket Song',Scribner's Magazine, watercolor, signed 1899
- Angel Appearing to the Shepherds, watercolor, signed 1901
- The Temptation of Eve, watercolor, 1902
- To These Belong the World and the Future, watercolor, 1903
- Charlotte-Coburg Ferry (1897)
- Burning Brush (1896)

== Additional resources ==
- Grove Dictionary of Art, New York: Grove's Dictionary, Inc., c. v. Ellis, Harvey
- Ellis (Harvey) Papers, (D252), Department of Rare Books and Special Collections, Rush Rhees Library, University of Rochester. The Ellis family memorabilia are here, including a number of Ellis's earliest childhood drawings and surviving office records. The department's website provides an inventory of the contents. Because of factual errors, the biography of Ellis that accompanies the inventory is best used with caution. Documents pertaining to the United States Court House and Post Office of Rochester (now City Hall) are in the Textual Records, National Archives Records Administration (NARA), College Park, Maryland. The Register of Letters Sent Chiefly by the Supervising Architect and Engineer in Charge, 14.628-30, and 15.716-17, summarizes each communication sent by the supervising architect about the Rochester building. Press copy books provide copies of letters sent by the local superintendent, who initially was Charles Ellis. They are incomplete and hard to read. Letters, including those from Charles, are also in the Public Service, General Correspondence Received 1843–1910, Record Group 121, Boxes 919 and 920. Drawings are in the Public Building Collection, Cartographic and Architectural Research Room at NARA. All told there are hundreds of items at NARA pertaining to the Rochester building.
- Ellis Papers, Military Academy Registers Entry 238, United States Military Academy, West Point, docouments details of Ellis's experience there.
- Rochester Art Club Minutes, Local History Division, Central Library of Rochester and Monroe County includes the minutes in Ellis' handwriting.
- Leroy S. Buffington papers, N2, Northwest Architectural Archives, University of Minnesota Libraries, Minneapolis, MN. An inventory of the Harvey Ellis drawings is contained in a subseries of the "Plans, Specifications, Sketches, Renderings, Scrapbook and Photographs" series of the Leroy S. Buffington papers.
- Harvey Ellis Drawings and Related Papers, Manuscript Notebooks 81, Research Center, Minnesota Historical Society. Its website contains an inventory of correspondence and a few drawings. Because of factual errors the accompanying biography is best used with caution.
- Edmond Eckel Papers, Albrecht-Kemp Museum, St. Joseph, Missouri, consist of uncatalogued correspondence and Eckel's payroll daybook. There are no perspective renderings by Ellis; they were destroyed in an office fire.
- Facts About Harvey Ellis- one-paragraph posts about various topics pertaining to Ellis
- Eileen Manning Michels, A Developmental Study of the Drawings Published in 'American Architect and Building News' and in 'Inland Architect Through 1895', Ph.D. dissertation, University of Minnesota, 1971, 94–122, discusses Ellis's perspective renderings in historical context and assesses their significance.
- American Architect and Building News, Boston: Osgood & Company, illustrations, 1885–93, passim.
- Inland Architect, Chicago: Inland Publishing Co., 1883–1893, illustrations, passim.
- The Craftsman, Eastwood, New York: United Crafts. 1901–04, illustrations, passim.
- The Memorial Art Gallery, University of Rochester, has the largest collection of Ellis's paintings. They span his life from childhood until shortly before his death.
