= International Meteor Organization =

Formally founded in 1988

- Abbreviation: IMO
- Formation: 1 May 1988
- Type: Non-profit
- Legal status: Active
- Headquarters: Mechelen, Belgium
- Region served: 42 Countries
- Official language: English
- Website: www.imo.net

The International Meteor Organization (IMO) was formally founded in 1988 from predecessor gatherings over many years. IMO has several hundred members and was created in response to an ever-growing need for international cooperation on amateur and professional meteor work. The collection of meteor observations by several methods from all around the world ensures the comprehensive study of meteor showers and their relation to comets and interplanetary dust.

IMO publishes a bimonthly journal called WGN (Note: WGN = "werkgroepnieuws" (Dutch language), in English as "workgroup news". WGN was initially a circular before it became a journal.) and holds an annual International Meteor Conference (IMC) in September.

== 2026 Cyberattack ==
In September 2026, IMO suffered a cyberattack on its aging infrastructure which left most of its site offline. Downtime due to the attack is expected to last several weeks. IMO has already restored the fireball reporting webpage.

== See also ==
- American Meteor Society
- List of astronomical societies
- Meteoritics
