= Werner Meng =

German jurist (1948–2016)

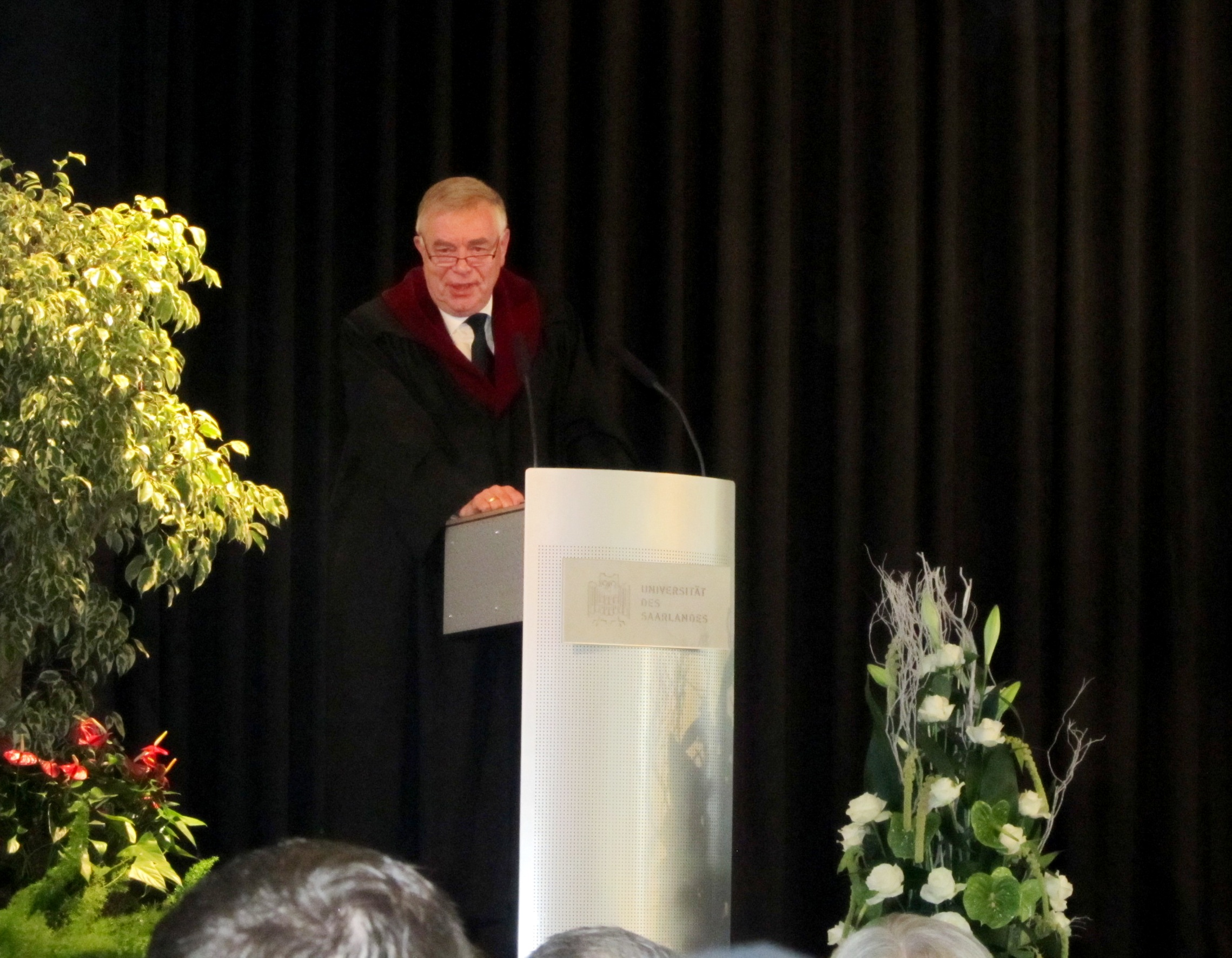
Prof. Werner Meng at LL.M. graduation ceremony.

Werner Meng (22 February 1948 – 1 July 2016) was a German jurist and Director of the Europa-Institut since 1999 as well as the holder of the Chair of Public Law, International Law and European Law at Saarland University.

== Career ==
Werner Meng studied Law in Mainz and Lausanne (Switzerland). He obtained his doctorate and his Habilitation at the University of Mainz. He worked as research scholar at the Max Planck Institute for Foreign Public and International Law in Heidelberg from 1980 until 1989 as well as at the University of Michigan, School of Law, Ann Arbor, in 1985. After working as a lawyer in Munich for a few years, he took on the Chair of Public Law, International Law, European and International Trade Law at the Martin-Luther-University Halle-Wittenberg in 1993, where he was also director of the Institute for Trade Law from 1997 to 1999, and dean of the law faculty from 1998 to 1999. Since 1999, he is the holder of the Chair of Public Law, International Law and European Law, as well as the Director of the Europa-Institut, law department, of Saarland University. In 2009, he was appointed honorary professor at Yunnan University, Kunming, China.

Werner Meng was visiting professor at the Chicago Kent University, at the World Trade Institute Bern (Switzerland), the Amsterdam Law School, the University of Rijeka Law School (Croatia), the Tulane Law School (New Orleans), the Louisiana State University (Baton Rouge), the Hong Kong City University School of Law, the Beijing University School of Law, the Chinese Academy of Social Sciences (Beijing), the Université Pierre Mendès France Grenoble, the Wuhan University School of Law, the Panteion-University Athens (Greece), as well as visiting professorial fellow at the Institute of International Economic Law, Georgetown University School of Law, Washington, D.C. Prof. Meng produces publications especially on the fields of International Trade Law, general International Law, and European Union Law.

He died of cancer on 1 July 2016.

== Research interests ==
- WTO Law
- International Trade Law (especially the civil law aspect)
- International Financial Law
- International Investment Law
- International Economic Law
- EU Law
- German and Foreign Constitutional Law

== Co-editorships ==
- Journal of International Economic Law (JIEL)
- International Law Archives „Archiv des Völkerrechts“ (AVR)
- Journal for European Studies „Zeitschrift für Europarechtliche Studien“ (ZEuS)
- Publications of Europa-Institut, Saarland University – Law Department
- Saarbrücken Studies on International Law „Saarbrücker Studien zum Internationalen Recht“

== Memberships ==
- Vereinigung der deutschen Staatsrechtslehrer
- Deutsche Gesellschaft für Völkerrecht
- American Society of International Law
- Wissenschaftliche Gesellschaft für Europarecht
- International Law Association (ILA)
- Committee on International Trade Law
- Rat der deutschen ILA-Landesgruppe
