= Rochester City Hall (New York) =

- Federal Building
- U.S. National Register of Historic Places
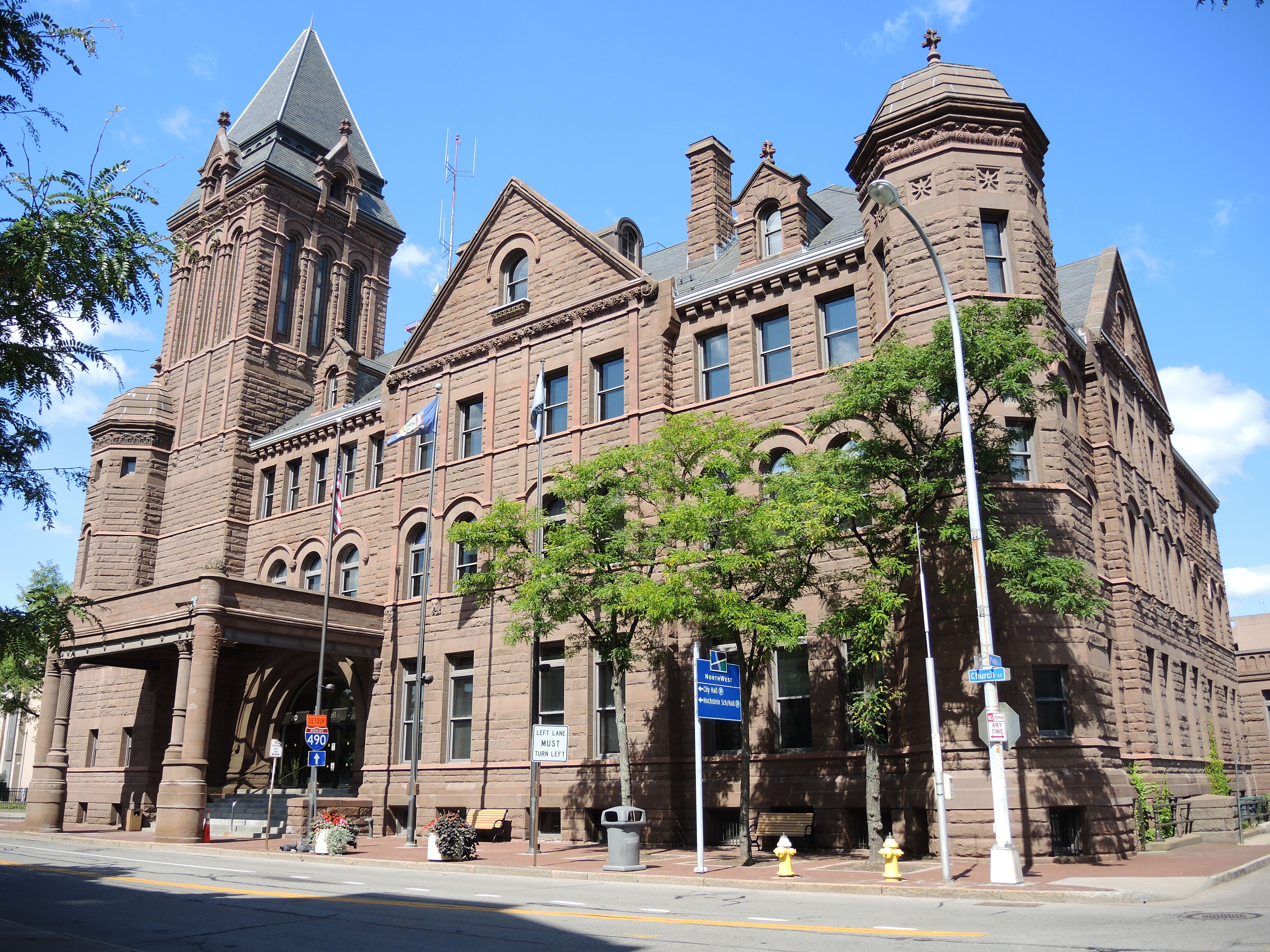
- Front view from Church Street

- Location within New York Location within the United States
- Interactive map showing the location of Rochester City Hall
- Location: 30 Church St., Rochester, New York
- Coordinates: 43°9′25″N 77°36′54″W
- Area: 0.5 acres (0.20 ha)
- Built: 1885; 141 years ago
- Architect: Office of the Supervising Architect (Mifflin E. Bell)
- Architectural style: Richardsonian Romanesque
- NRHP reference No.: 72000856
- Added to NRHP: April 13, 1972

Rochester City Hall, also known as the Federal Building and Old Post Office, is a historic government building at 30 Church Street in Rochester, Monroe County, New York. Built between 1885 and 1889 as a federal courthouse and post office, it is a Richardsonian Romanesque structure of brown sandstone with a metal interior frame. The building served various federal agencies until 1973, when the City of Rochester purchased it and converted it into the municipal seat of government. It was listed on the National Register of Historic Places in 1972 and designated a local landmark in 1973.

== History ==
=== Federal era ===
The United States Congress authorized construction of a new post office and courthouse in Rochester in 1882 under the Treasury Department's Office of the Supervising Architect. The building was designed in the Office of the Supervising Architect of the United States Treasury under Mifflin E. Bell. The Rochester firm of H. & C. S. Ellis was involved in the project, with Charles Ellis serving as the local superintendent of construction; the firm's role has sometimes been overstated, and Harvey Ellis is popularly but erroneously credited as the designer. Extensive documentation in the National Archives confirms that the building, like other federal structures of the period, was designed within the Supervising Architect's office.

Ground was broken in 1885, and the building was completed and opened to the public in 1889. The project was authorized by Congress for construction over a period of nine years, with the design revised partway through following additional appropriations. The building was expanded in 1893 and again in 1907 to accommodate growing federal operations.

During its years as a federal facility, the building housed the United States Post Office, the United States District Court, a customs office, an Internal Revenue office, the F.B.I., a Prohibition enforcement office, and a draft board, among other agencies. The building served as Rochester's main post office until the 1930s, when postal operations were relocated to a new facility on Cumberland Street.

=== Conversion to City Hall ===
In 1973, remaining federal operations relocated across the street to the new Kenneth B. Keating Federal Building at 100 State Street, and the old Federal Building was left vacant. The City of Rochester purchased the building from the U.S. government for $1 in 1975. After an extensive renovation, the building was rededicated as Rochester City Hall in 1978, replacing the city's previous seat of government at 30 Broad Street (now known as Irving Place and subsequently The Rockford).

== Architecture ==
=== Exterior ===
The building is a three-and-a-half-story structure of rectangular plan, measuring approximately 159 by 222 feet (48 m × 68 m). It is constructed of arkosic brown sandstone quarried in Portland, Connecticut, in the Hartford Basin—the same type of stone used in New York City's brownstone row houses. The walls are approximately 18 inches (460 mm) thick and rest on masonry bearing walls with steel interior framing.

The design is characterized by massive walls, repeated round arches supported by short stocky columns, asymmetrical roof lines, turrets, and a prominent clock tower. The exterior features extensive hand-carved sculptural ornamentation, including grotesques depicting various animals and human heads, executed by Italian stone carvers. The five-bay south facade faces Church Street.

=== Interior ===
The interior is organized around a skylighted central atrium of three stories, regarded as one of the most elaborate interior spaces in Rochester. The atrium features four tiers of round arches, cast-iron work, Tennessee marble columns, and a glass ceiling. Other original interior materials include abundant hardwood trim and decorative cast iron.

The building originally contained three hydraulic elevators—one passenger, one freight, and an ash lift from the furnace—powered by a steam boiler. The former Federal Court Room, now serving as the City Council Chambers, is paneled in cherry wood with hand-sculpted wooden adornments and is illuminated by an electrically lit artificial skylight from the law library on the fourth floor. A marble electric clock and wooden desks from the old City Hall on Broad Street were moved to the building during the renovation.

During the 1970s renovation, a new staircase was added opposite the front entrance, with a blue tile mosaic floor outlined in mirror-finish stainless steel, designed to evoke the Genesee River. A fountain in the atrium was designed to repeat the building's arch motif, and a courtyard linking the original structure (Building A) with a new addition (Building B) displays the newel post from the original cast-iron Federal Building staircase as a sculptural element.

== Current use ==
Rochester City Hall houses the offices of the Mayor, Deputy Mayor, Chief of Staff, City Council, City Clerk, and the Budget and Communications bureaus. The Link Gallery on the first floor displays rotating exhibits of local artists' work every six weeks. Historical displays include a restored 1876–1908 city map, reinstalled for Rochester's 150th anniversary in 1984, and memorabilia from Rochester's eight sister cities.

Federal offices in Rochester are now located across the street at the Kenneth B. Keating Federal Building and United States Court House at 100 State Street.

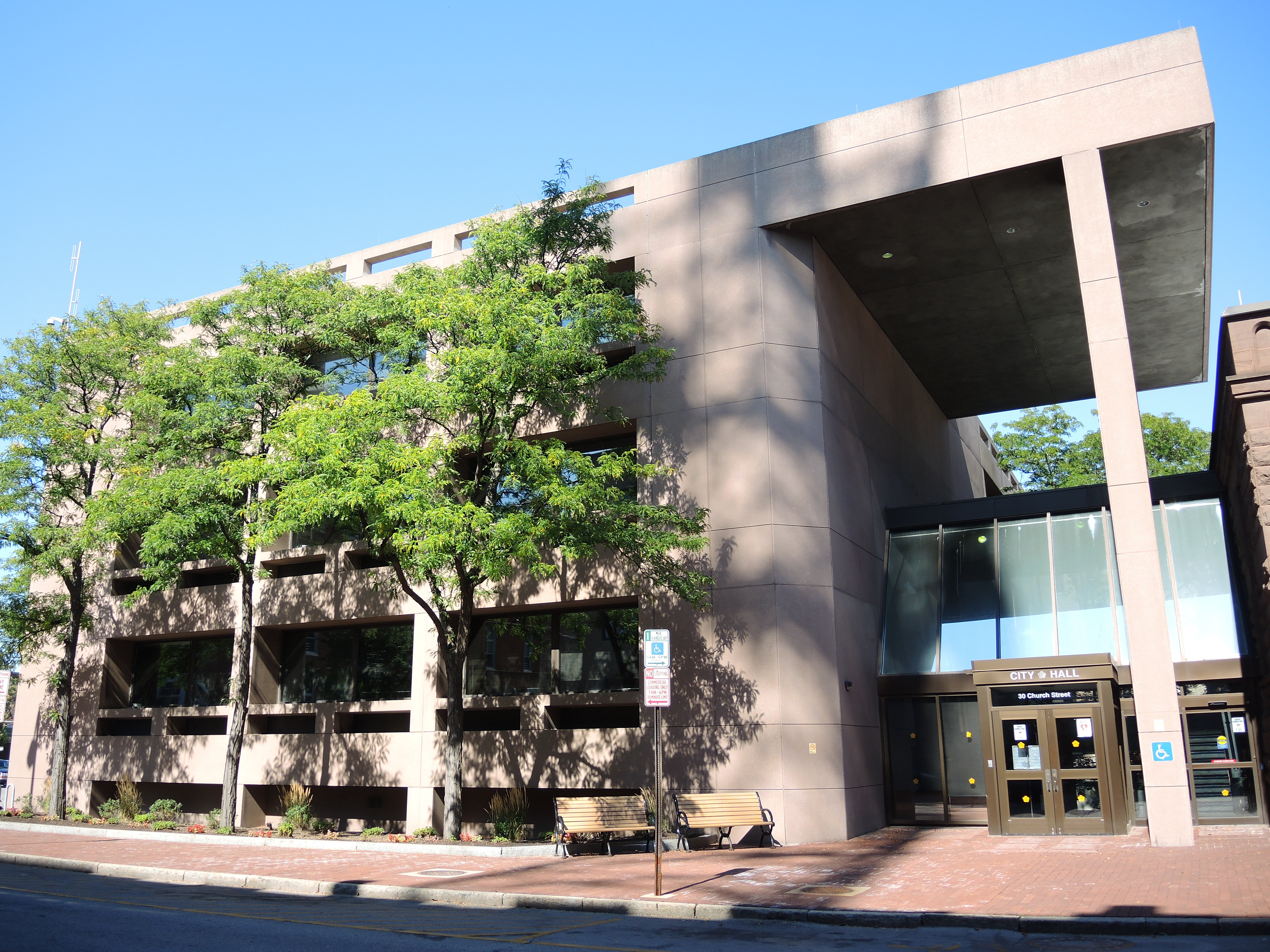
City Hall annex

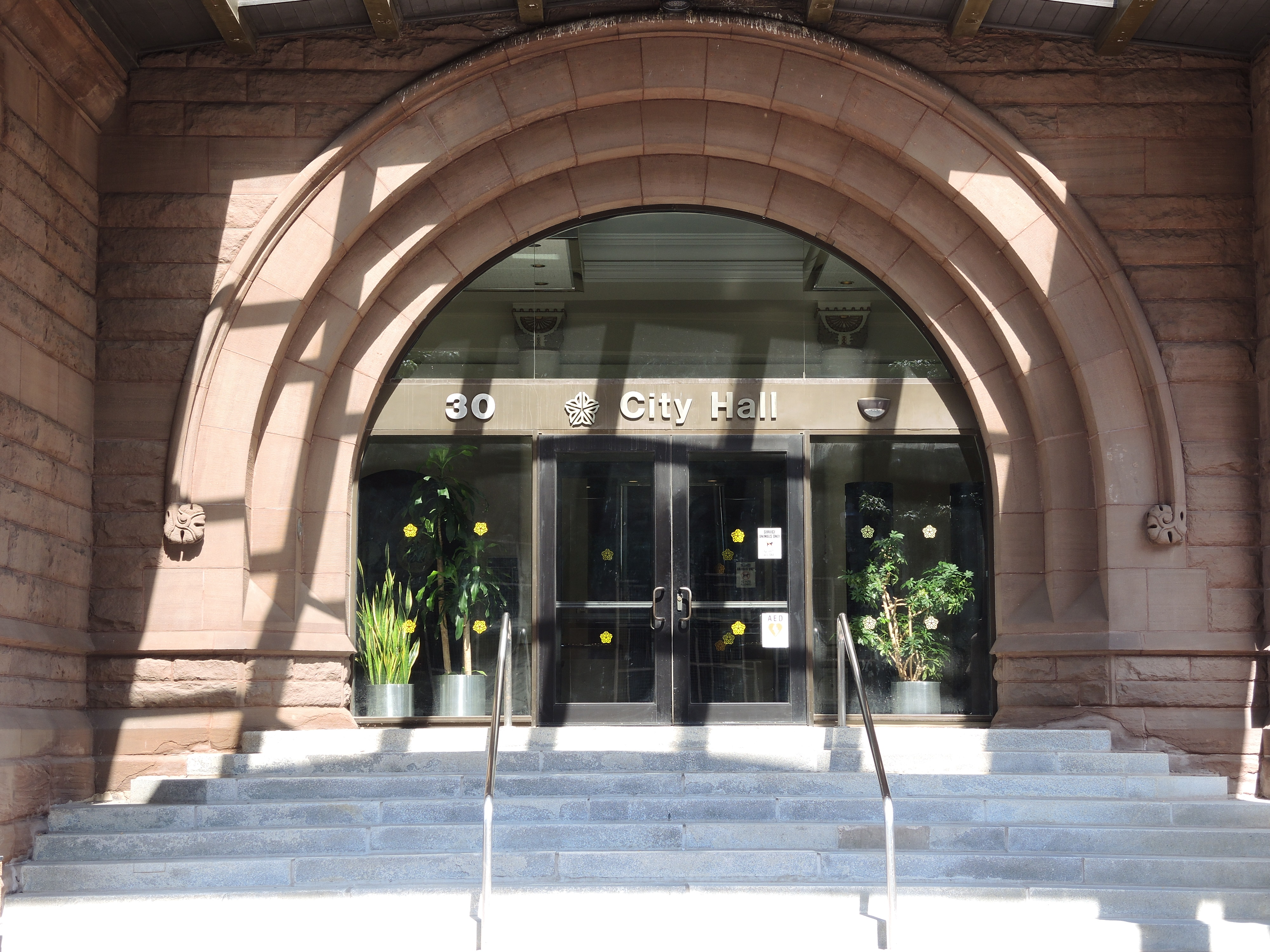
Entrance

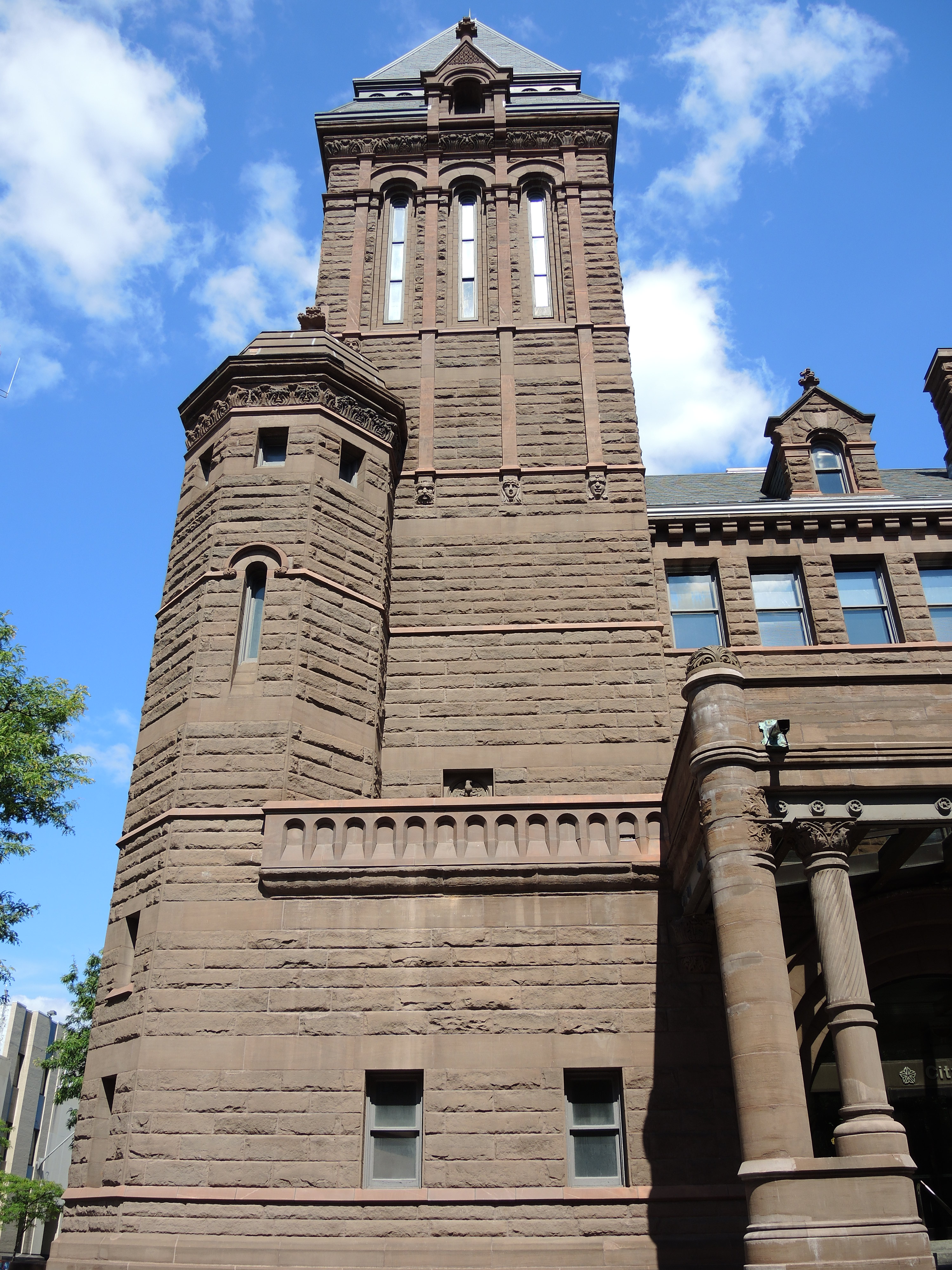
Tower

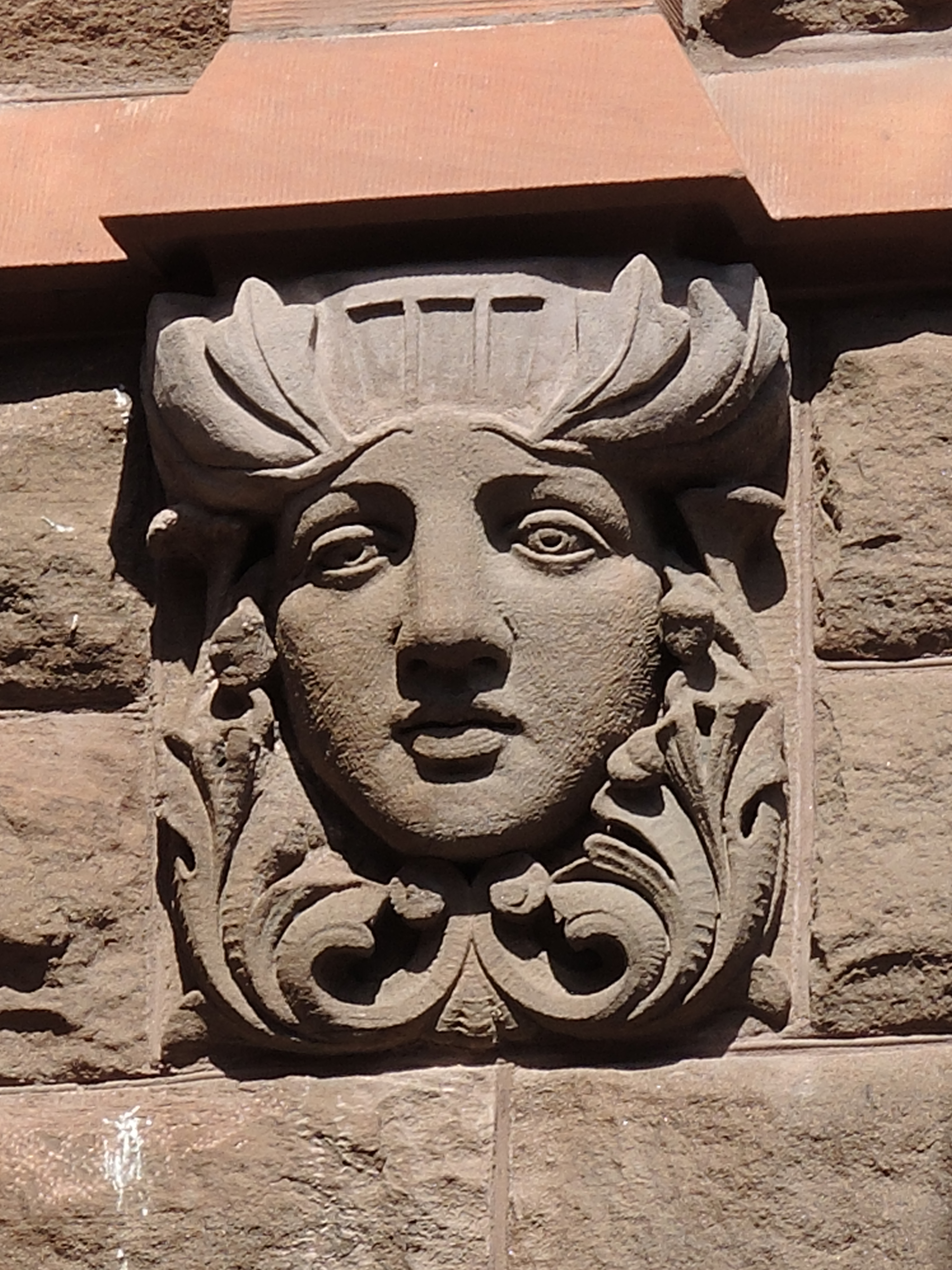
Grotesque

== See also ==
- National Register of Historic Places listings in Rochester, New York
- Harvey Ellis
