= Thomas Giegerich =

German jurist

Thomas Giegerich (born 15 March 1959 in Wiesbaden, Germany) is a German jurist. He is professor for European law, international law and public law at Saarland University and director of the Europa-Institut, Saarbrücken.

== Biography ==
Thomas Giegerich studied law at the Johannes Gutenberg University Mainz (JGU) from 1978 until 1984. He went to the University of Virginia on a Fulbright scholarship from 1984 to 1985, where he graduated as Master of Laws (LL.M.) He returned to Mainz for his "Referendariat" in 1985, working also as an assistant to Eckart Klein, at the Institute for International and European Law. In the summer semester of 1987 he studied as legal clerk (Rechtsreferendar) at the German University of Administrative Sciences Speyer.

After the second state exam, he transferred to Ruprecht-Karls-Universität Heidelberg in 1989 – first to the University´s law faculty and subsequently to the Max Planck Institute for Foreign Public and International Law. In 1991, he obtained his doctorate at the University of Mainz, the title of his dissertation having been "Privatwirkung der Grundrechte in den USA: Die State Action Doctrine des U.S. Supreme Court und die Bürgerrechtsgesetzgebung des Bundes". After a two-year intermezzo as research assistant at the Federal Constitutional Court (Department of Constitutional Court judge Paul Kirchhof), Thomas Giegerich started his habilitation project on European constitutional law with relation to the German constitution at the Max Planck Institute for Foreign Public and International Law in Heidelberg (under Helmut Steinberger), which he finished in 2001. From 1996 until 2002, he represented the scientific employees of Max-Planck-Institute for Foreign Public and International Law in the Scientific Council of the Max-Planck-Society.

During the winter term 2001/02, Thomas Giegerich had an interim professorship at Goethe University Frankfurt. For winter term 2002/2003, he was appointed professor of public law with an emphasis on European and International Law at Bremen University. There, he was dean of studies from summer 2005 to March 2006. During the Summer Term 2006, he held a professorship for Public Law with the focus on International Law and European Law at the Christian-Albrechts-Universität zu Kiel, where he became also Co-Director of the Walther-Schücking-Institut for International Law. At the same time, he was co-editor of the German Yearbook of International Law as well as representative of the law faculty of Kiel University for the Erasmus program and matters of Internationalization. He spent his research sabbatical as visiting fellow at the Lauterpacht Centre for International Law at the University of Cambridge in 2007. In winter term 2011/12 he taught international law as a visiting professor at the school of law at the University of Edinburgh.

2004, 2005 and 2007 he gave guest lectures on fundamental freedoms and fundamental rights in the European Union at the law faculty of Yeditepe University in Istanbul. 2007, he gave a guest lecture at the college of law of Zhejiang Gongshang University in Hangzhou, China. Since 2008, he has been an independent expert for the independence and impartiality of the European Commission in the course of the negotiations for accession of Turkey and was part of three Turkey missions.

In 2009, Thomas Giegerich gave a lecture at the 69th Annual Assembly of the "Vereinigung der Deutschen Staatsrechtslehrer" in Graz. As co-opt member of the executive board, he had organized the 72nd Annual Assembly that took place in October 2012 in Kiel.

== Research priorities ==
- The law of the European Union (European Law in relation to national constitutional law, European Human Rights Convention, external action of the European Union)
- International Law (Protection of Human Rights, International contract law and International dispute settlement)
- Comparative constitutionalism (federal systems, protection of fundamental rights)

== Co-Editorships (selection) ==
- German Yearbook of International Law (2006–2012).
- Herausforderungen und Perspektiven der EU, Berlin, 2012.
- Internationales Wirtschafts- und Finanzrecht in der Krise, Berlin, 2011.
- Der „offene Verfassungsstaat“ des Grundgesetzes nach 60 Jahren – Anspruch und Wirklichkeit einer großen Errungenschaft, Berlin, 2010.
- A Wiser Century? Judicial Dispute Settlement, Disarmament and the Laws of War 100 Years after the Second Hague Peace Conference, Berlin, 2009.
- Wirtschaftliche, soziale und kulturelle Rechte im globalen Zeitalter, Berlin, 2008.
- The EU Accession of Cyprus, Baden-Baden, 2006.

== Memberships ==
- American Society of International Law
- Arbeitskreis Europäische Integration
- Deutsche Gesellschaft für Internationales Recht
- Deutsche Vereinigung für Internationales Recht
- European Society of International Law
- Vereinigung der Deutschen Staatsrechtslehrer
