= Jill Giegerich =

American artist (born 1952)

Jill Geigerich
- Born: 1952 (age 73–74); Chappaqua, NY
- Education: MFA California Institute of the Arts; BFA California Institute of the Arts
- Known for: Painting

Jill Giegerich is an American visual artist known for her paintings and photography. She has had over twenty solo exhibitions, including those at the Santa Monica Museum of Art, Los Angeles Institute of Contemporary Art, San Francisco Museum of Art among others. Her work has been presented in over 100 group exhibitions, including those at the California Museum of Photography, Orlando Museum of Art, Museum of Contemporary Art, Los Angeles, Los Angeles County Museum of Art, Sezon Museum of Modern Art, Tokyo, Japan, among others. A retrospective survey of her art from 1979 to 2001 was held at the Armory Center for the Arts in Pasadena, California.

== Collections ==
Giegerich's work is represented in many public, corporate and private collections including the Carnegie Institute, Pittsburgh, PA; Museum of Contemporary Art, Los Angeles; Newport Harbor Art Museum; Brooklyn Museum; Phoenix Art Museum, the Museum of Modern Art, New York, among others.
