= Goodsell Observatory =

Observatory at Carleton College in Minnesota, US

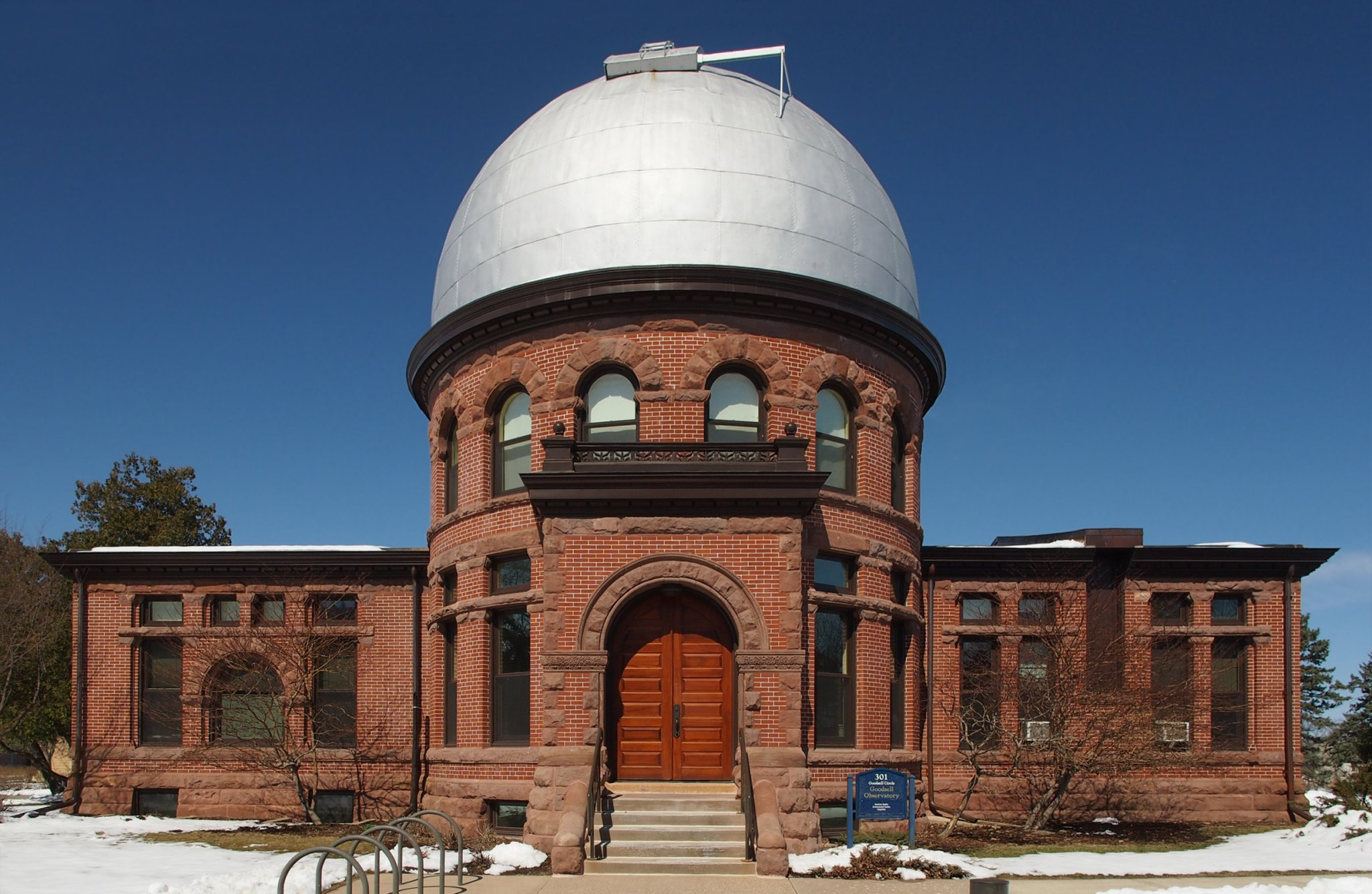
- Goodsell Observatory from the south
- Organization: Carleton College
- Observatory code: 741
- Location: Northfield, Minnesota, US
- Coordinates: 44°27′43″N 93°09′09″W
- Altitude: 290 m (950 ft)
- Weather: See the Clear Sky Clock
- Established: 1887
- Website: www.carleton.edu/goodsell/

Telescopes
- John Brashear: 16.5-inch aperture refractor
- Alvan Clark: 8.25-inch aperture refractor
- Goodsell Observatory--Carleton College
- U.S. National Register of Historic Places
- Area: Less than one acre
- Built: 1887
- Architect: Harvey Ellis
- Architectural style: Romanesque Revival
- NRHP reference No.: 75001025
- Designated: May 12, 1975
- Related media on Commons

Goodsell Observatory is an observatory at Carleton College in Northfield, Minnesota, United States. It was constructed in 1887 and was, at the time, the largest observatory in the state of Minnesota, the 6th largest in the U.S., and the 12th largest in the world. The Goodsell Observatory and its predecessor, a smaller observatory that opened in 1878, served as a widely consulted timekeeping station, bringing national prominence to Carleton College in the late 19th and early 20th centuries.

Goodsell Observatory was listed on the National Register of Historic Places in 1975 for its national significance in the themes of architecture, communications, education, engineering, literature, and science. It was nominated for being one of the nation's few intact 19th-century observatories (complete with a large collection of vintage scientific equipment); and for its critical timekeeping service, its association with scientific literature (founder William W. Payne also founded the journal Popular Astronomy), its fine Romanesque Revival architecture, and continuous use as a teaching facility. Currently, both telescopes in the Observatory are used in astronomy classes as well as for monthly open house events to allow the public to observe. The building also houses a computer imaging lab used by astronomy students, an astronomy library, a historic 5" meridian circle, and other equipment used in the late 1800s and early 1900s for timekeeping purposes. The building also has space for more offices, a classroom, and has become home to Carleton's Sustainability Office.

== Background ==
William W. Payne, one of Carleton's original professors, taught mathematics and natural philosophy, and established a course in astronomy during his first year at the college. The course grew into a program, and Carleton's president and board of trustees agreed to construct a small astronomical observatory on campus. It was Carleton's fifth building. Though small, the observatory housed instruments of the highest quality, including an 8 1/4-inch refractor by Alvan Clark & Sons and a 3-inch (7.6 cm) Fauth transit circle.

Shortly after the small observatory opened in 1878, a telegraph line was established from Carleton campus to central Northfield, and the observatory began transmitting a time signal at three minutes to noon each day. The signal was based on astronomical measurements and was picked up by cities throughout Minnesota, as well as area banks, jewelers, and the various railroad lines of the Northwest, including the Northern Pacific and the Great Northern. A U.S. Army Signal Corps station was placed at the observatory in 1881 and transmitted meteorological data to Washington, D.C. The facility also served as the headquarters of a state weather service from 1883 to 1886.

== Establishment and use ==
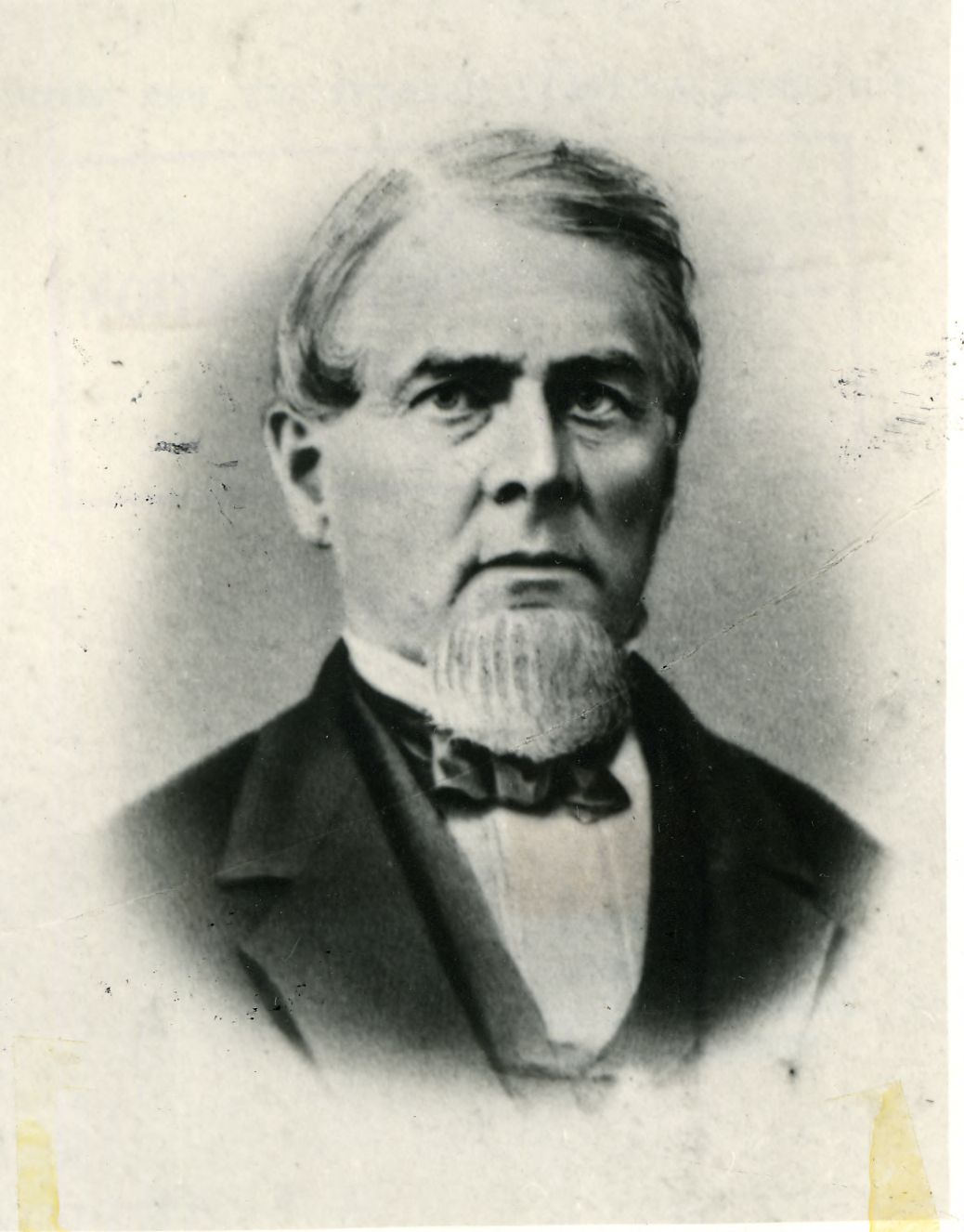
Charles M. Goodsell

In 1886 the college purchased a brand new meridian circle with a gift of $5,000 (equivalent to $179,167 in 2025) from James J. Hill, whose railroads benefitted from Carleton's time service. The meridian circle was too big to fit in the existing building, so Carleton decided to build a new, larger observatory. The second observatory was designed by Harvey Ellis of the J. Walter Stevens architectural firm of Saint Paul. It was completed in 1887 and named after one of the college's founders, Charles M. Goodsell.

By 1888, time signals from Carleton's Goodsell Observatory were used on more than 12,000 miles (19,000 km) of railroad track. Railroad companies in the Northwest thought that the signal coming from Carleton was more accurate than the one transmitted by the United States Naval Observatory in Washington, D.C. Accurate time was important for avoiding collisions and keeping trains running on schedule.

In 1891 Goodsell Observatory was equipped with a 16.2-inch (41 cm) telescope produced by the famous John Brashear of Pennsylvania. The German equatorial mount was designed and fabricated by Warner & Swasey of Cleveland Ohio. It was then the twelfth-largest refractor in the world and sixth-largest in the United States. The old observatory was made into a library and then torn down to make room for Laird Hall in 1905. The observatory acquired a sidereal clock in 1910. In 1922 Carleton professor Edward Fath constructed one of the nation's first photoelectric photometers in Goodsell. The time service was continued until 1931 and the study of astronomy was prominent at Carleton well into the 20th century.

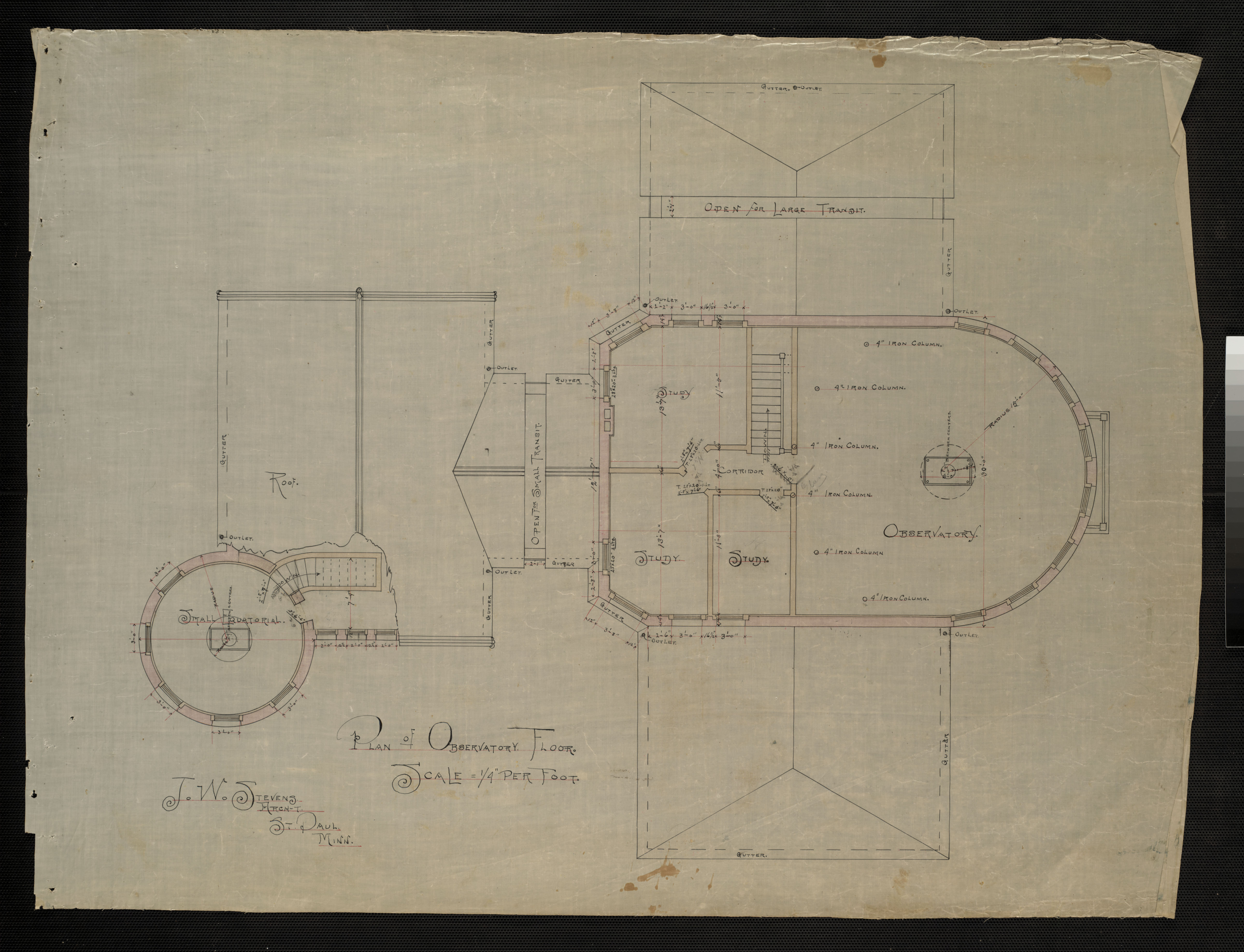
Architectural plan of the Goodsell Observatory's main floor, 1887. Carleton College collection.

Goodsell served as the model for the Chamberlin Observatory at the University of Denver.

The collection of meteorites on display in Goodsell was given to the college by the meteoriticist Harvey H. Nininger as payment-in-kind for his daughter's tuition in 1942.

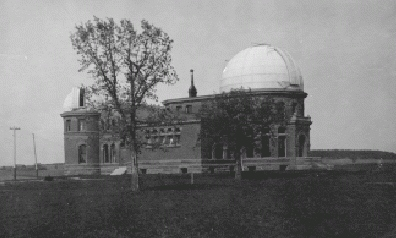
Goodsell Observatory in 1895

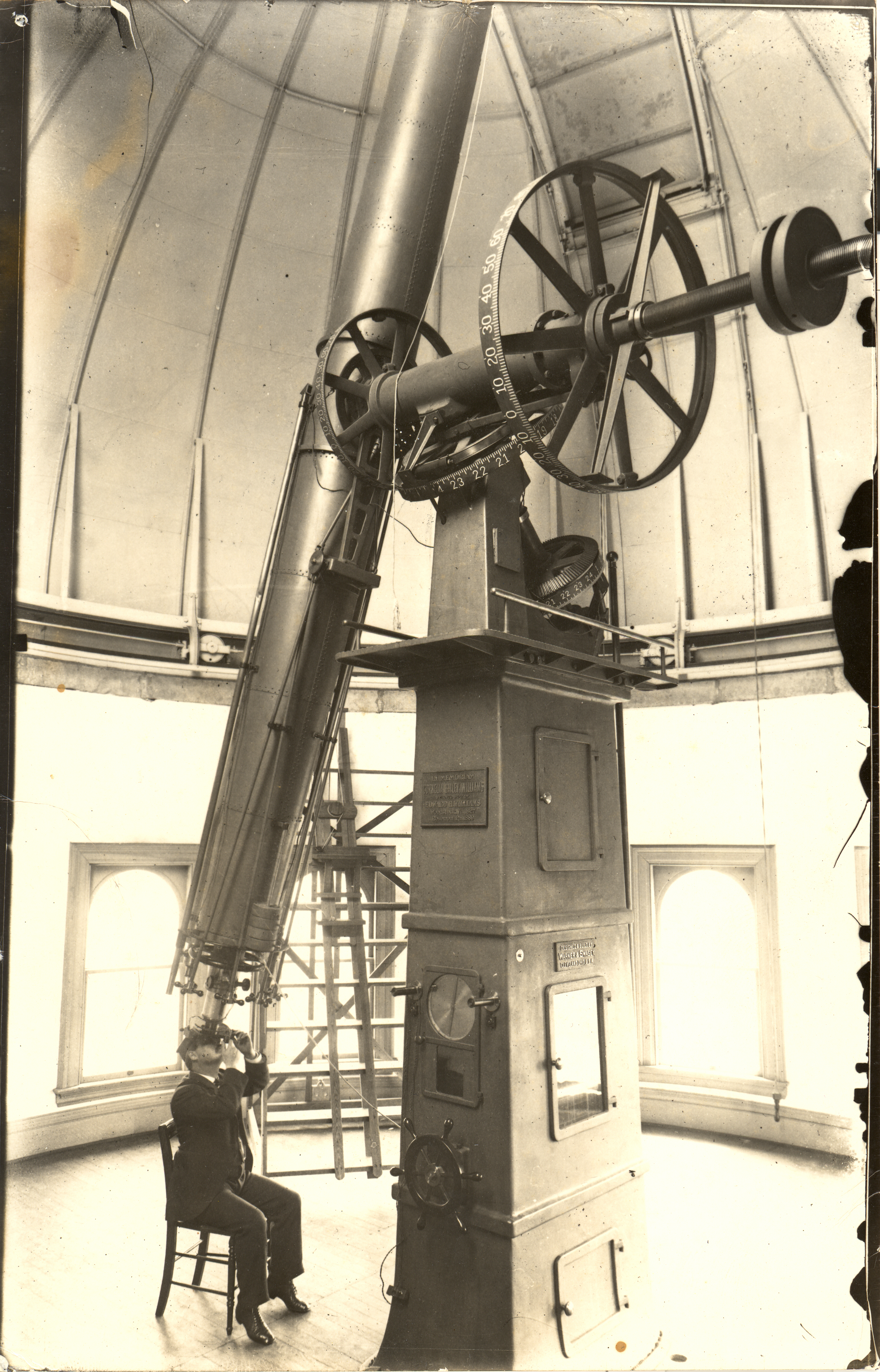
The 16.2 inch telescope in the main dome (contact printed from a 19th-century glass plate)

== Publications ==
The observatory published The Sidereal Messenger from 1882 to 1892, later renamed Astronomy and Astro-Physics from 1893 to ~1896. In 1893, a successor publication, Popular Astronomy, was established.

== See also ==
- List of astronomical observatories
- National Register of Historic Places listings in Rice County, Minnesota
