= Edward Gingerich =

Amish criminal

Edward Gingerich (August 18, 1963 – January 14, 2011) was an Amish man from Rockdale Township, Pennsylvania, who was convicted of manslaughter in the 1993 death of his wife, Katie. He was the first Amish person to be convicted of homicide.

== Biography ==
He was said to have been rebellious toward the Amish way of life from an early age, and members of their community were apprehensive of the marriage between Ed and Katie. He spent a lot of time in the wood shop, becoming increasingly interested in the limited machinery the Amish allowed themselves to operate as well as interacting with non-Amish people (known as the English, regardless of ethnicity). The belief was that an unwaveringly faithful woman would be a good influence on the troubled young man and so the marriage went ahead.

After the wedding and the birth of a son, Gingerich became increasingly depressed. Through the wood shop he worked in, he befriended non-Amish man Dave Lindsey who told him that unless he renounced his Amish faith and became a born-again Christian like Lindsey, he would go to Hell.

Gingerich's mental state continued to deteriorate and eventually he began hallucinating and had a psychotic break that scared his Amish community to the point of contacting 911 for help. Gingerich was diagnosed with paranoid schizophrenia and was given medication to ease his symptoms. His medication eased Gingerich's hallucinations but put him in a "zombie" state that he disliked and eventually he stopped taking his doses. His state of mind continued to deteriorate. Lindsey, among other evangelists who visited Gingerich at the wood shop, lectured him about renouncing his faith and led him to believe that he was being confined and almost held captive by his wife, Katie. There are reports that he began to associate her with the devil.

== Manslaughter ==
On March 18, 1993, Gingerich entered his home's kitchen where Katie was working, and punched her in the face, knocking her to the ground. Katie yelled for her 6-year-old son, who was in the room at the time, to run and get help. The young boy ran over a mile to his uncle's home, but by the time the man arrived at the scene of the crime, Katie was long dead. Seeing his brother standing beside her gruesome body, covered in blood, the man feared for his own life and fled to the house of a nearby English family where he called 911.

When assistant fire chief and Emergency medical technician Andy McLaughlin arrived on the scene, the scene was horrific. Gingerich had beaten Katie to death, taken the time to put on heavy, high top boots, and stomped on Katie's skull until she was left unrecognizable. Not only that, Gingerich had removed all her internal organs and piled them beside her body. In recordings of Gingerich's police interrogation, he can be heard saying that "For some reason, I think we could still save her".

After his trial, Gingerich was found "guilty of involuntary manslaughter but mentally ill". He was sentenced to a minimum term of two and one-half years and a maximum of five years with credit for time served since his May 19, 1993, incarceration. Hence, Ed would be eligible for parole by late 1995. Gingerich was denied his first bid for parole in December 1995. However, on March 19, 1998, at the age of 34, and having served his full sentence, he was released from the State Correctional Institution in Mercer, Pennsylvania.

== Death ==
In January 2011, Gingerich was found hanged in a barn in Cambridge Springs, Pennsylvania, where he had been living with his attorney. He wrote "Forgive me please" in the dust atop a bucket before committing suicide.
