= Curvin H. Gingrich =

American astronomer (1880-1951)

Curvin Henry Gingrich
- Born: November 20, 1880; York, Pennsylvania
- Died: June 17, 1951 (aged 70); Northfield, Minnesota
- Occupations: Educator, editor, astronomer
- Spouse: Mary Ann Gross
- Children: Gertrude

Academic background
- Education: B.S./M.S. Dickinson College; Ph.D. University of Chicago
- Thesis: A determination of the photographic magnitudes of comparison stars in certain of the Hagen fields (1912)
- Doctoral advisor: John Adelbert Parkhurst

Curvin Henry Gingrich (November 28, 1880 – June 17, 1951) was an American mathematician, astronomer, educator, and editor. He was professor of mathematics and astronomy at Carleton College, and editor of the Popular Astronomy magazine.

== Biography ==
He was born in York, Pennsylvania, the son of William Henry Gingrich and Ellen née Kindig. Gingrich matriculated to the Dickinson College in Carlisle, Pennsylvania, graduating in 1903 with an A.B. and a commencement award for excellence in scholarship, then an M.A. in 1905. Starting in 1903, Gingrich taught mathematics at the Methodist Seminary in Maryville, Missouri. He joined the faculty of Northwest Missouri College in Albany, Missouri from 1905–1907. In 1907, he was hired at Baker University in Baldwin City, Kansas.

At Carleton College in Northfield, Minnesota, William W. Payne taught courses in astronomy and mathematics, and founded the college's Goodsell Observatory in 1887. He launched the Popular Astronomy magazine in 1893. After Payne retired in 1908, Gingrich was brought in to replace him. He became associate editor of the magazine under Herbert C. Wilson, and an instructor at Carleton College.

Starting in 1909, he spent his summers working toward his doctorate at the University of Chicago. He was granted his Ph.D. in 1912 with a thesis titled, "A determination of the photographic magnitudes of comparison stars in certain of the Hagen fields". Gingrich was the first student to be awarded a doctorate by way of his work at Yerkes Observatory. He was promoted to full professor of mathematics and astronomy at Carleton.

Beginning in 1914, he served in various administrative roles at the college. He was named Acting Dean in 1914–1915, Dean in 1915–1917, then assistant to the president and registrar 1917–1919. He served as chairman of the Department of Mathematics for many years. On August 10, 1915, Gingrich was married to Mary Ann Gross (1894–1986). The couple would have a daughter, Gertrude.

During the summer season, Gingrich taught as a visiting professor at the University of Minnesota (1920), the University of Chicago (1922), and Columbia University (1929, 1930). In 1922, he took a year long sabbatical to pursue work at Mount Wilson Observatory. He became full editor for the Popular Astronomy in 1926, succeeding Wilson. Gingrich performed research at the Leander McCormick Observatory during the summer of 1935. In 1941, he was awarded a honorary doctorate of science by his alma mater, Dickinson College.

As a regular staff member at Goodsell Observatory and a visitor at others, he made measurements of comet positions and double stars, performed stellar photography, and measured stellar parallaxes and proper motions. In 1950, he was made an honorary member of the AAVSO.

Gingrich died June 17, 1951, at the age of 70; he was due to retire on June 30, the end of the academic year. His death was unexpected, leaving Popular Astronomy without an editor. By the end of 1951, it ceased publication. Gingrich had served as editor for 25 volumes.
