= Europa-Institut =

Educational institution in Saarland, Germany

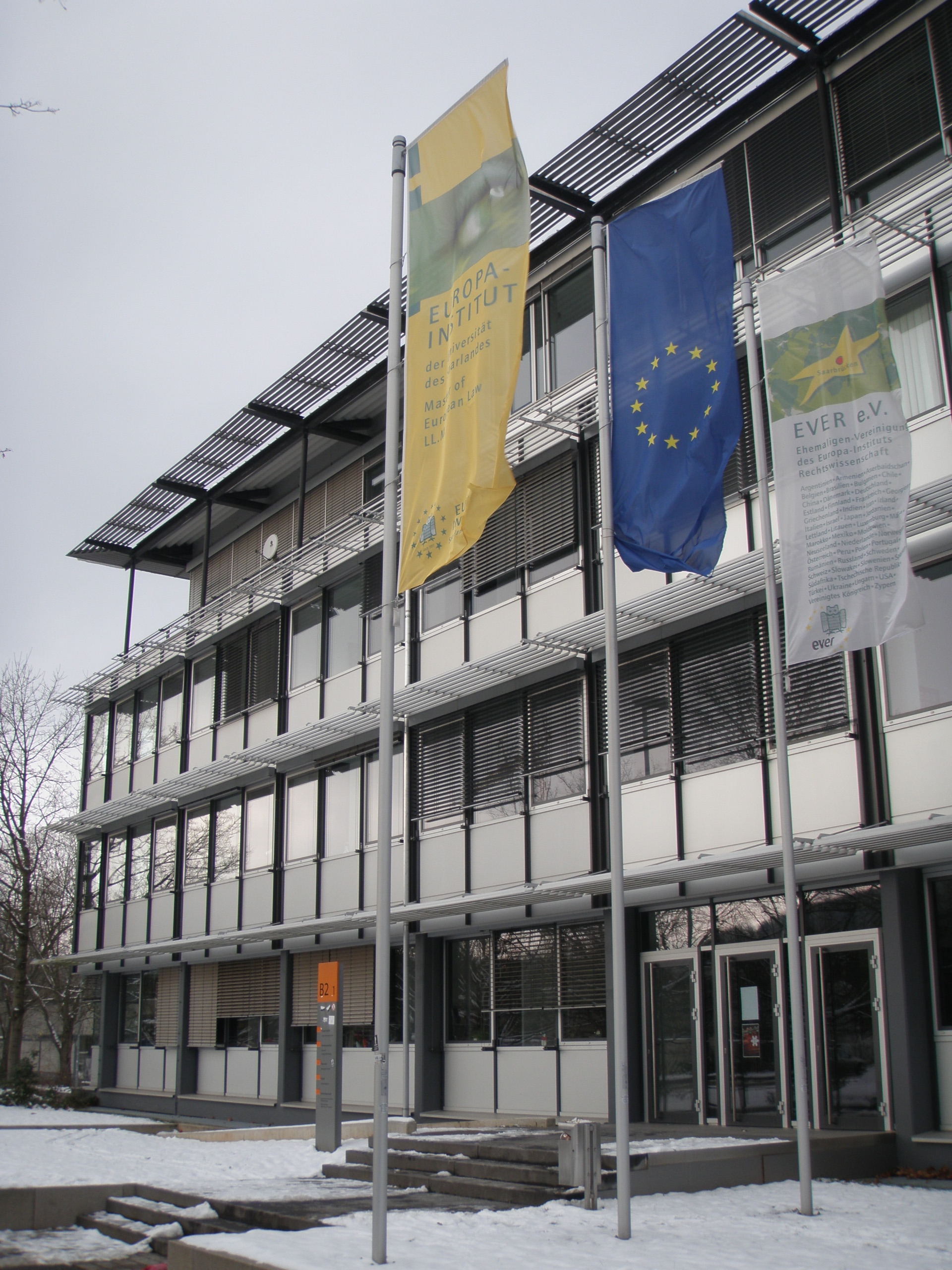
- Type: Postgraduate Institute
- Established: 1951
- Parent institution: Saarland University
- Directors: Till Patrik Holterhus; Marc Bungenberg
- Students: ~ 75
- Location: (Germany) Saarbrücken, Saarland, Germany (EU); 49.255556°N 7.041667°E
- Working languages: English and German
- Website: http://www.europainstitut.de/

The Europa-Institut was founded at Saarland University in 1951, before the signing of the Treaties of Rome, and is the second oldest institution focused on European Integration (after the College of Europe, Bruges, Belgium). More than 5,000 students from all over the world have since graduated from the Institute. Having built on the content of its study program continuously and adapted to developments on the European level over time, the Europa-Institut today focuses on European law and international law with the possibility of specialization in specific study units.

Location of Europa-Institut in Germany
- Location within Germany
- Coordinates: 49°15′20″N 7°2′30″E

== History ==
=== Initial focus on history and culture ===
The Europa-Institut was intended to be the "jewel and symbol" of Saarland University, a university itself based on the merger of German and French educational traditions, founded under the aegis of France and the University of Nancy in 1948 and boasting personalities such as Robert Schuman amongst the first of its students.

Aims and tasks of the Europa-Institut are to research the Europe of the future, to teach young people educated in the traditional manner of each different country about Europe, to offer education from a uniform European perspective for students from these countries and, perhaps before long, to produce Europe’s driving forces.

— Prof. Joseph-François Angelloz (the first director of the Institute and second vice chancellor of the University)

The Europa-Institut dedicated itself to following the European integrational process from the very beginning, providing a curriculum independent of that of Saarland University and taught by personalities such as the French politician, academic and pioneer of the European movement, André Philip.

To start with, almost all "European disciplines" were included in the study program. The focus during the first two years, namely 1951 and 1952, was on comparative literature, philosophy, history and musicology. Law and economics were disciplines which played a complementary role.

The gradual integration of the European Community influenced the development of the curriculum so that the program began to reflect formation of the Community's legal, economical and political character. As such, the former program description of the Europa-Institut stated that, "The moment at which Europe, driven by its historical development, becomes conscious of its unity and the reality surrounding it and where consequently new political, legal, economic and cultural organs are formed and unfold," would mark the point at which it was imperative to offer a corresponding, uniform European education.

=== Creation of European Communities: shift to focus on diplomacy ===
The importance of the Institute also grew with the development of project Europe. In 1953 a structural change led to the establishment of a diplomacy department within the Institute. The purpose of this department was to train students wishing to pursue a career in diplomacy or in the civil service of the, at that time, semi-autonomous Saarland region. In the meantime, the law, culture, economics and independent language department established themselves further.

When Saarland joined the Federal Republic of Germany in 1957, Saarland University adopted the German university system. The Europa-Institut, which up to that point was geared primarily towards cultural and literary studies, was transformed into a European research institute with law and economics as the focal point. The Europa-Institut began operating with this concept in the winter term of 1957/58.

In the mid 1960s, the study program was combined so as to constitute a single integrated course. The emphasis lay on the specific problems pertaining to the European integrational process and the related instruments and methods. Law-based courses formed the core of program and these were complemented by courses in history, politics and economics.

=== Since 1980: focus on European Law ===
The postgraduate program LL.M. "European Integration" was established in 1980 by the law department of the Institute, with Prof. Dr. Dr. Dr. h.c. mult. Georg Ress and Prof. Dr. Michael R. Will as the first to head it. In 1991, Prof. Dr. Torsten Stein from Heidelberg became co-director of the Europa-Institut, which he led together with Prof. Dr. Werner Meng from Halle since 1999. In 2012, Prof. Dr. Thomas Giegerich has been appointed the new co-director in succession to Prof. Dr. Torsten Stein and in 2015 Marc Bungenberg took over for Werner Meng, who has since passed away.

In 1990 the postgraduate MBA program "European Management" was established by the economics department of the Institute.

The Europa-Institut is supported by the German Federal Foreign Office, the German Federal Ministry of Education and Research, the European Commission and the German Academic Exchange Service (DAAD). It stands for high educational standards, close contact and regular exchange with institutions in the European Union, the Council of Europeas well as with the German Federal Foreign Office.

The Europa-Institut was thoroughly examined and certified by the ACQUIN agency within the context of the system accreditation of Saarland University.

The program accreditation states that the Europa-Institut offers both excellent research opportunities and excellent quality in teaching.

The Europa-Institut also received the "Certificate for Quality of Internationalisation (CeQuInt)" for the successful implementation of an internationalization strategy in its Master's program.

== Academic programs ==
=== Master of European Law, LL.M. ===
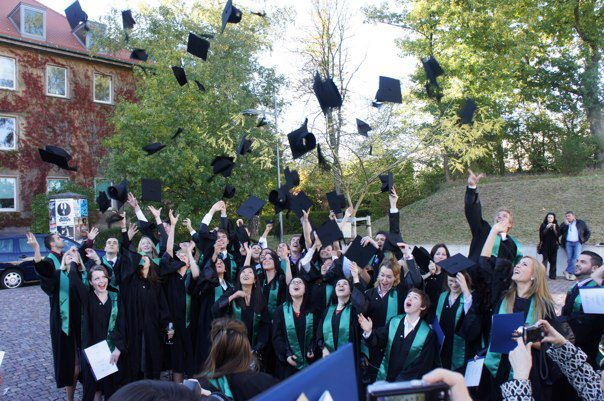
2010/2011 class celebrating graduation

The Master's program European Integration is a 12-month, full-time LL.M course centering on substantive, institutional and procedural European law and international law. To successfully complete the program, students need to gain 60 credits. The study comprises 2 semesters (9 months) of lectures (45 credits) and a written thesis (usually 3 months, 15 credits).

It offers the following specializations:

- European Integration (taught in German and English)
- International Dispute Resolution (taught in English)
- Foreign Trade and Investment (taught in English)
- European Economic Law (taught in German and English)
- European Protection of Human Rights (taught in German and English)
- IT Law (taught in German)

Students can specialize in a maximum two fields. To gain a specialization, a student needs to successfully complete the given unit, i.e. gain a minimum of 12 credits as well as pass unit's obligatory courses. The institute as well as the university use French grading system; students with an average of over 15 gain the right to be admitted to doctoral study. The current fee can be checked here

=== Master of Business Administration, MBA ===
The MBA program European Management focuses on European market. As a prerequisite completion of undergraduate study of at least 240 credits as well as 2 years of corresponding working experience are required (in addition to fluency in English).

It focuses on three aspects: people (their needs & cultures), markets and morals (the responsibility both towards environment and employees). It comprises 15 study units (9 months, 45 credits) and final thesis (usually 3 months, 15 credits). There is also possibility of part-time study, which may take as long as four years. Students attend the 15 study units, but the extended length allows them to do it while working. Also the term for final thesis is extended to 6 months. As of 2021 the fees are €12,000 for full-time study and €14,500 for part-time study.

== EVER Alumni Association ==
The alumni association EVER was established by current and former students of the Europa-Institut, Law Department, of Saarland University, in 1996. By means of numerous activities, the alumni association aims to:

- Establish a network of Europa-Institut graduates
- Secure the mutual exchange of information after completion of the advanced study program
- Keep in contact with former students of the Europa-Institut
- Complement the range of academic opportunities on offer at the Europa-Institut

In addition, EVER unites students and alumni of different nationalities across professional and geographic borders and thus constitutes, alongside the study program itself, a contact forum that contributes to international understanding worldwide.

== European Documentation Centre ==
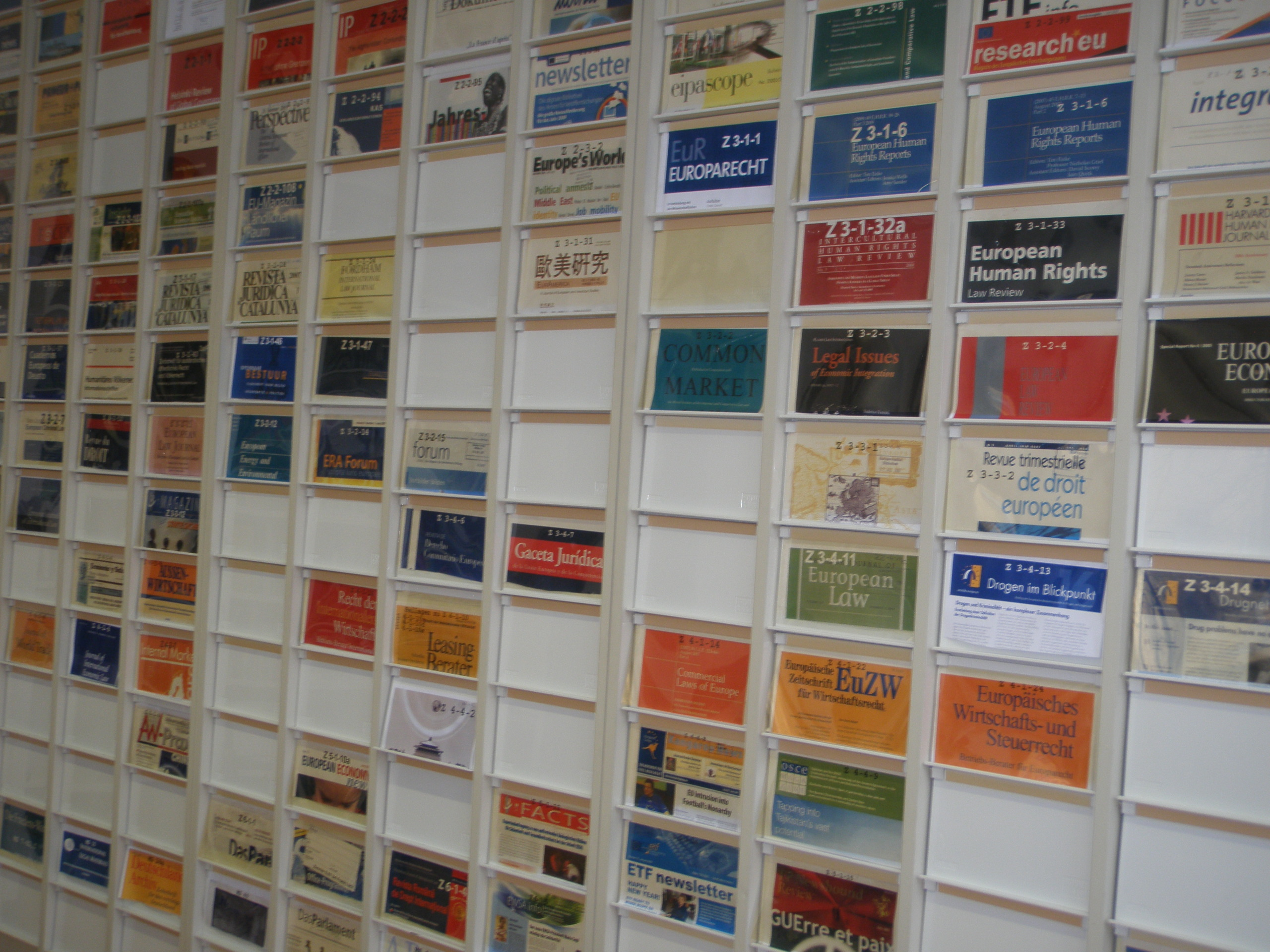
Some of the periodicals available at the Europa-Institut's library

Since 1972, the Europa-Institut holds one of 52 European Documentation and Information Centers (EDC) in Germany and forms part of a network of 600 EDCs worldwide. The goal of the EDCs is to make available to the public (both in and outside the university system) information on the European Union and its policies and to support the research and teaching of the European integrational process.

All publicly available official publications of the EU (Official Gazette of the EU, documents of the Commission, case law of the European Court of Justice), as well as periodicals, brochures and information material are collected in the EDC. Access to numerous databases of the EU as well as to an increasing amount of electronic documentation is also provided

== Publications ==
Since 1998, the Europa-Institut has published the legal journal “Zeitschrift für Europarechtliche Studien” (ZEuS). ZEuS is broad in scope: contributions deal with current and general problems in European integration as well as European and international law.

ZEuS offers the opportunity to publish in German and English, thereby providing an internationally established forum for articles from the academic as well as the practical field.

It is particularly important for ZEuS that young academics may contribute to the journal. The examination and selection of contributions occurs via an extensive and thorough evaluation procedure (peer review) and is done independently by two members of the editorial team.

== Directors ==
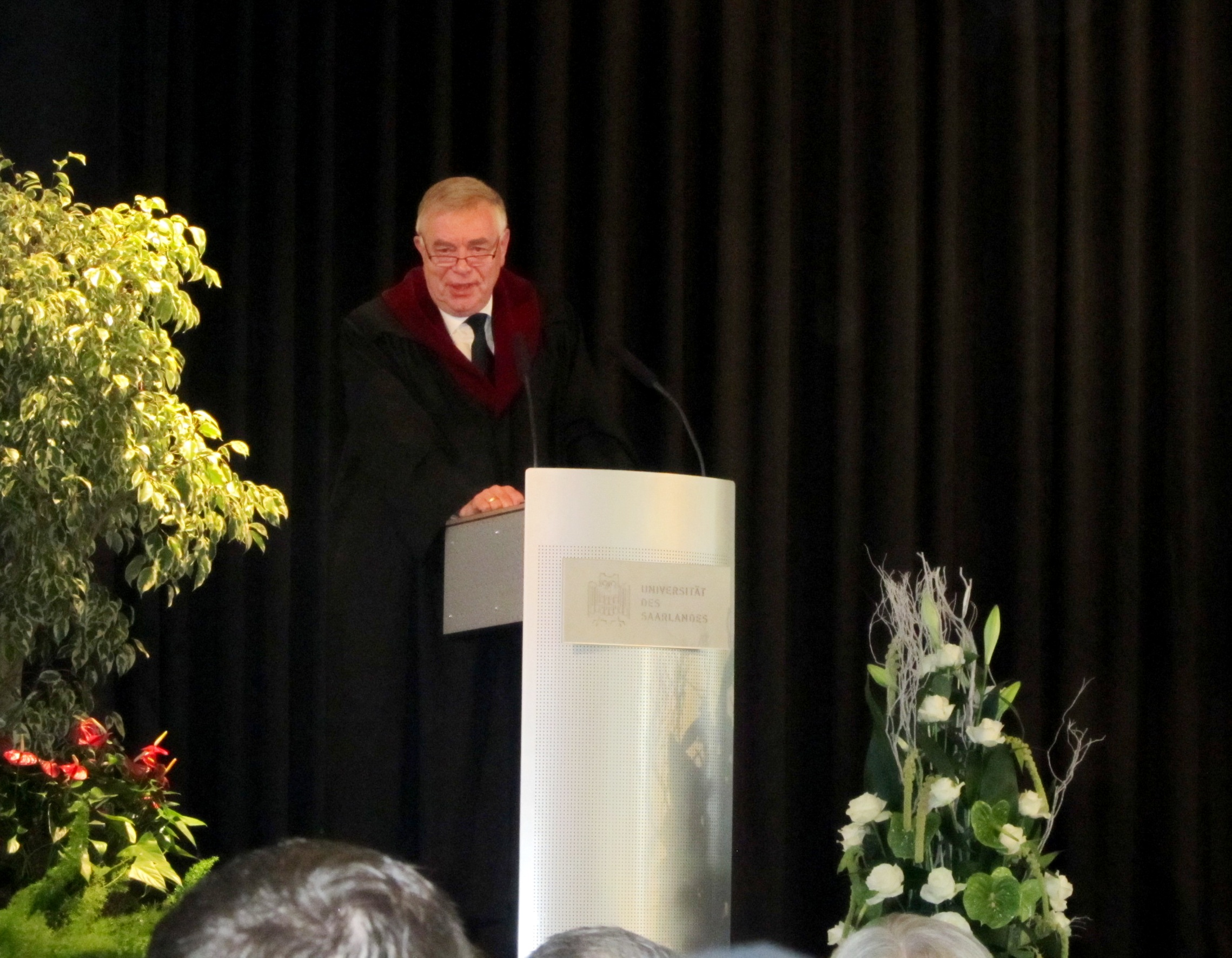
Director Werner Meng holding a speech during LL.M. graduation ceremony

The directors of the Institut are as follows:

- 1951–1956: Joseph-François Angelloz
- 1956–1958: Heinz Hübner
- 1958–1961: Bernhard Aubin
- 1961–1978: Léontin-Jean Constantinesco
- 1979–1989: Michael R. Will
- 1979–1991: Georg Ress
- 1991–1998: Georg Ress & Torsten Stein
- 1999–2012: Torsten Stein & Werner Meng
- 2012–2015: Werner Meng & Thomas Giegerich
- 2015-2026: Thomas Giegerich & Marc Bungenberg
- 2026-: Till Patrik Holterhus & Marc Bungenberg

== See also ==
- European University Institute
- College of Europe
- European Academy of Sciences and Arts
