= Popular Astronomy (US magazine) =

Magazine for amateur astronomers

- Frequency: 10 per year
- Founded: 1893; 133 years ago
- First issue: September 1893; 133 years ago
- Final issue: 1951; 75 years ago
- Country: United States
- Based in: Northfield, Minnesota
- Language: English

Popular Astronomy is an American magazine published by John August Media, LLC and hosted at TechnicaCuriosa.com for amateur astronomers. Prior to its revival in 2009, the title was published between 1893 and 1951. It was the successor to The Sidereal Messenger, which was published from March 1882 to 1892. The first issue of Popular Astronomy appeared in September 1893. Each yearly volume of Popular Astronomy contained 10 issues, for a total of 59 volumes.

The first editor, from 1893 to 1909, was William W. Payne of Carleton College, with Charlotte R. Willard as co-editor 1893–1905. Payne was followed by Herbert C. Wilson, who served in the post between 1909 and 1926. Dr. Curvin Henry Gingrich, Professor of Mathematics and Astronomy at Carleton, served as the final editor for the initial publication run, which ended with his sudden death (by heart attack) in 1951. Dr. Gingrich received a six-page eulogy written by Dr. Frederick C. Leonard, in the August 1951 issue of the magazine.

The magazine played an important role in the development of amateur variable star observing in the United States.

In 2017 Popular Astronomy has returned as part of TechnicaCuriosa.com, along with sister titles Popular Electronics and Mechanix Illustrated.

== Writers ==
- Jane MacArthur FRAS, a British planetary scientist

== See also ==
- Astronomy (magazine), a monthly astronomy magazine founded in 1973
- Sky & Telescope, a monthly astronomy magazine founded in 1941
