= C/2025 R2 (SWAN) =

Long-period comet

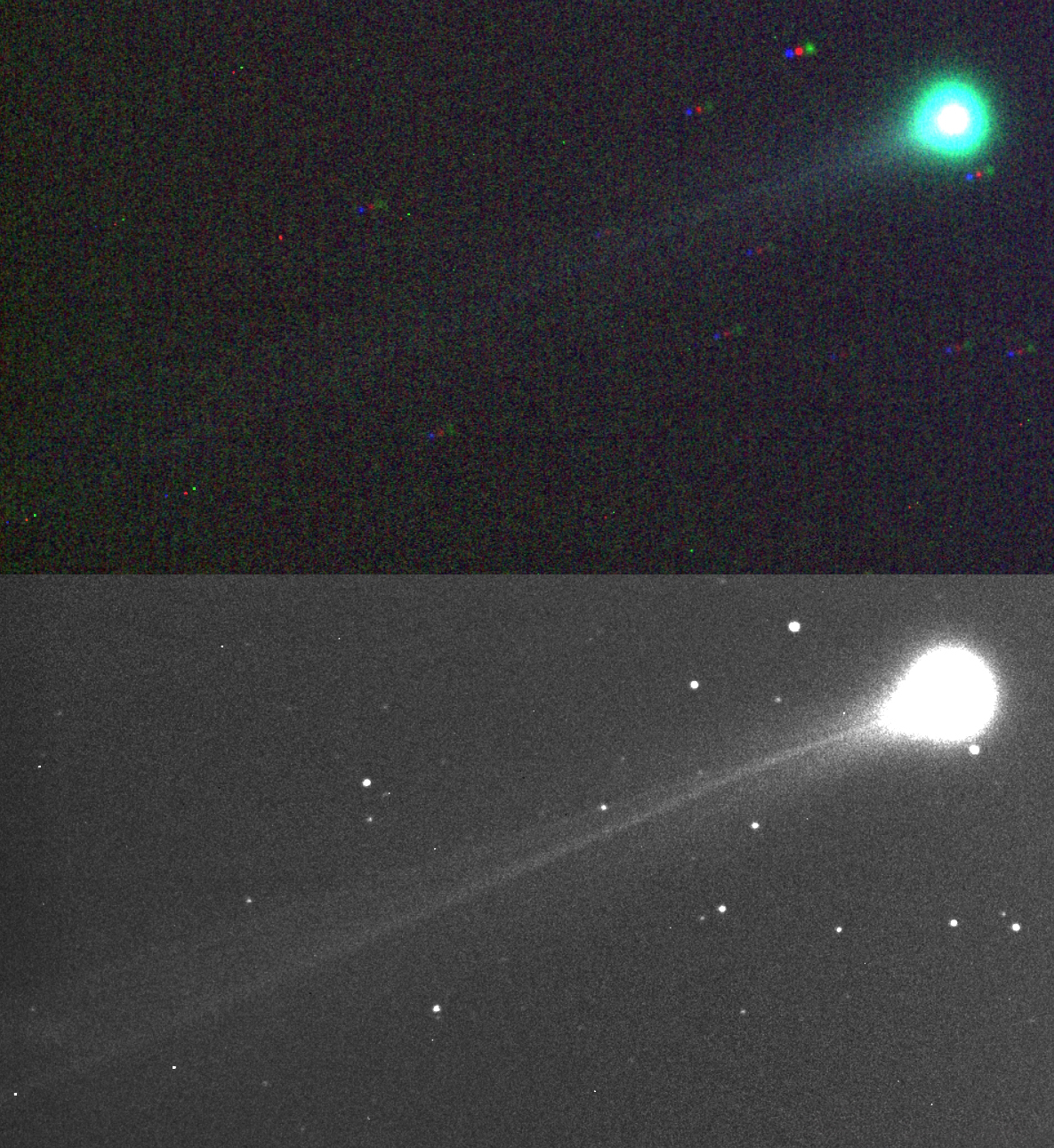
- Comet C/2025 R2 (SWAN) imaged from the Siding Spring Observatory on 13 September 2025 with a 0.5 m (20 in) telescope.

Discovery
- Discovered by: SOHO–SWAN; Vladimir Bezugly
- Discovery date: 11 September 2025

Designations
- Alternative designations: SWAN25B, CK25R020

Orbital characteristics
- Epoch: 11 November 2025 (JD 2460990.5)
- Observation arc: 197 days 168 days (without STEREO-A)
- Earliest precovery date: 13 August 2025
- Number of observations: 2225
- Aphelion: 177 AU (inbound); 167 AU (outbound) (Note: Using JPL #21, the comet is expected to come to aphelion (farthest distance from the Sun) around the year 2407 at about 167 AU.)
- Perihelion: 0.5041 AU
- Semi-major axis: 89 AU (inbound); 84 AU (outbound)
- Eccentricity: 0.9943 (inbound); 0.9940 (outbound)
- Orbital period: ≈840 years (inbound) ≈770 years (outbound); 810 years (near perihelion)
- Inclination: 4.4730°
- Longitude of ascending node: 335.33°
- Argument of periapsis: 308.36°
- Mean anomaly: 0.072
- Last perihelion: 12 September 2025
- T_{Jupiter}: 0.936
- Earth MOID: 0.048 AU
- Jupiter MOID: 0.042 AU

Physical characteristics
- Mean radius: 0.3–1.0 km (0.19–0.62 mi)
- Comet total magnitude (M1): 13.9±1
- Apparent magnitude: 6.0 (Note: Since the surface brightness of a diffuse coma+nucleus is harder to detect than a point-like star of the same magnitude, a comet realistically needs to reach an apparent magnitude of ≈4.5 to be visible to the naked eye under a rural dark sky. Magnitude 6 is a good target for 40mm binoculars and magnitude 8 is a good target for 70mm binoculars.) (2025-09-26)

C/2025 R2 (SWAN), formerly known as SWAN25B, is a long-period comet discovered on 11 September 2025 by Vladimir Bezugly through SWAN imagery. The comet peaked around apparent magnitude +6 in late September 2025.

== Observational history ==
The comet was first spotted in images from the SWAN instrument onboard the Solar and Heliospheric Observatory (SOHO) by amateur astronomer Vladimir Bezugly on 11 September 2025. The presence of the comet was confirmed by other amateur astronomers, having an estimated magnitude of 7.4 and featuring a tail about 2 degrees long. C/2025 R2 is officially the 20th comet discovered through SOHO's SWAN instrument according to its discoverer, Vladimir Bezugly. (Note: This figure includes 273P/Pons–Gambart, which was recovered and identified through SWAN imagery in 2012. Therefore, C/2025 R2 is actually only the 19th comet discovered through SWAN alone.) The comet upon discovery was located in the constellation of Virgo and it was better seen from the southern hemisphere, where it was higher in the sky after sunset.

This is a time-lapse of C/2025 R2 (SWAN) captured in October 2025. It shows 40 minutes of movement. The core is going in the direction of the tail because the comet has already passed the sun and is leaving the inner solar system.

C/2025 R2 was not discovered earlier in part because of the Holetschek effect as the comet was less than 30 degrees from the Sun between August 7 – September 13. Additionally, since the comet wasn't detected by ground-based surveys while it was at opposition in February 2025, (Note: In February 2025, C/2025 R2 was about 2.4 AU (360 million km) from Earth and 3.4 AU (510 million km) from the Sun.) the comet was probably inactive at the time, had a very low albedo, or its nucleus is less than a kilometer in radius. Between August and September the comet had rapidly brightened from magnitude 11 to magnitude 8. The comet reached an apparent magnitude of 6.2 on 16 September 2025.

The comet underwent an outburst later in September and its magnitude was reported to have reach mag 5.9. At that time it was in the same region of the sky as 3I/ATLAS and C/2025 K1 (ATLAS), the latter of which came very close to each other from the Earth's perspective on 29 September. On 2 October, it passed near Zubenelgenubi, and it passed directly over Messier 16 on 17 October. It was around magnitude 6 during its closest approach to Earth on 20 October 2025. Coincidentally another comet, C/2025 A6 (Lemmon), was expected to be magnitude 4 around the same time.

On 2 November 2025, a possible fragmentation event was observed from the Two-meter Twin Telescope (TTT3) of the Teide Observatory, with reports indicating that either the nucleus is splitting into two or it may be in the process of releasing a substantial fragment. The fragmentation probably occurred around mid-October.

NASA announced in December 2025 that the Polarimeter to Unify the Corona and Heliosphere (PUNCH) spacecraft had observed the comet between 25 August and 2 October 2025.

== Orbit ==
C/2025 R2 (SWAN) came to perihelion one day after discovery on 12 September 2025 at a distance of 0.5 AU (75 million km) from the Sun.

Earth passed near the comet's meteoroid stream around 6 October 2025 and it had a chance of producing a weak meteor shower with a radiant only a few degrees from the Sun. Meteor showers are more likely when a periodic comet is near perihelion as the debris from the previous passage will have only slowly spread out along the comet's orbit. But the distance to Earth's orbit (E-MOID) is a fairly large 0.048 AU (7.2 million km; 4.5 million mi), and the comet has such a long orbital period that the dust is likely too diluted to generate a shower. (Note: Comet C/1861 G1 (Thatcher) with an orbital period of 422 years is known for the April Lyrids meteor shower. C/1911 N1 (Kiess) with an orbital period of ~2067 years is known for the Aurigids meteor shower.)

The comet made its closest approach to Earth at a distance of 0.26 AU (39 million km; 24 million mi) on 20 October 2025. It crossed the celestial equator on 3 November 2025.

=== Orbital period ===
The comet is dynamically old having come from 180 AU (6 times farther out than Neptune) and therefore did not come directly from the Oort cloud region. As the comet was discovered near perihelion, the closest approach to the Sun is well known. The orbital period and aphelion (farthest distance from the Sun) are not as well known. The inbound orbital period was about 840 years and the outbound orbital period is about 770 years.

== Physical characteristics ==
Spectra of the central part of the coma of C/2025 R2 (SWAN) were taken with the Échelle spectrograph FLECHAS at the University Observatory Jena on 18 October 2025. In the wavelength range between 5000 and 7500 Å many emission features were detected in the spectrum of C/2025 R2 (SWAN), the most prominent ones are those of C_{2}, NH_{2}, and [OI]. In contrast to C/2025 A6 (Lemmon), no Na emission was detected in the spectrum of the coma of C/2025 R2 (SWAN).

== See also ==
- C/2025 A6 (Lemmon)
- C/2025 F2 (SWAN) – a disintegrated comet formerly known as SWAN25F
- C/2025 K1 (ATLAS)
