= C/2025 A6 (Lemmon) =

Non-periodic comet

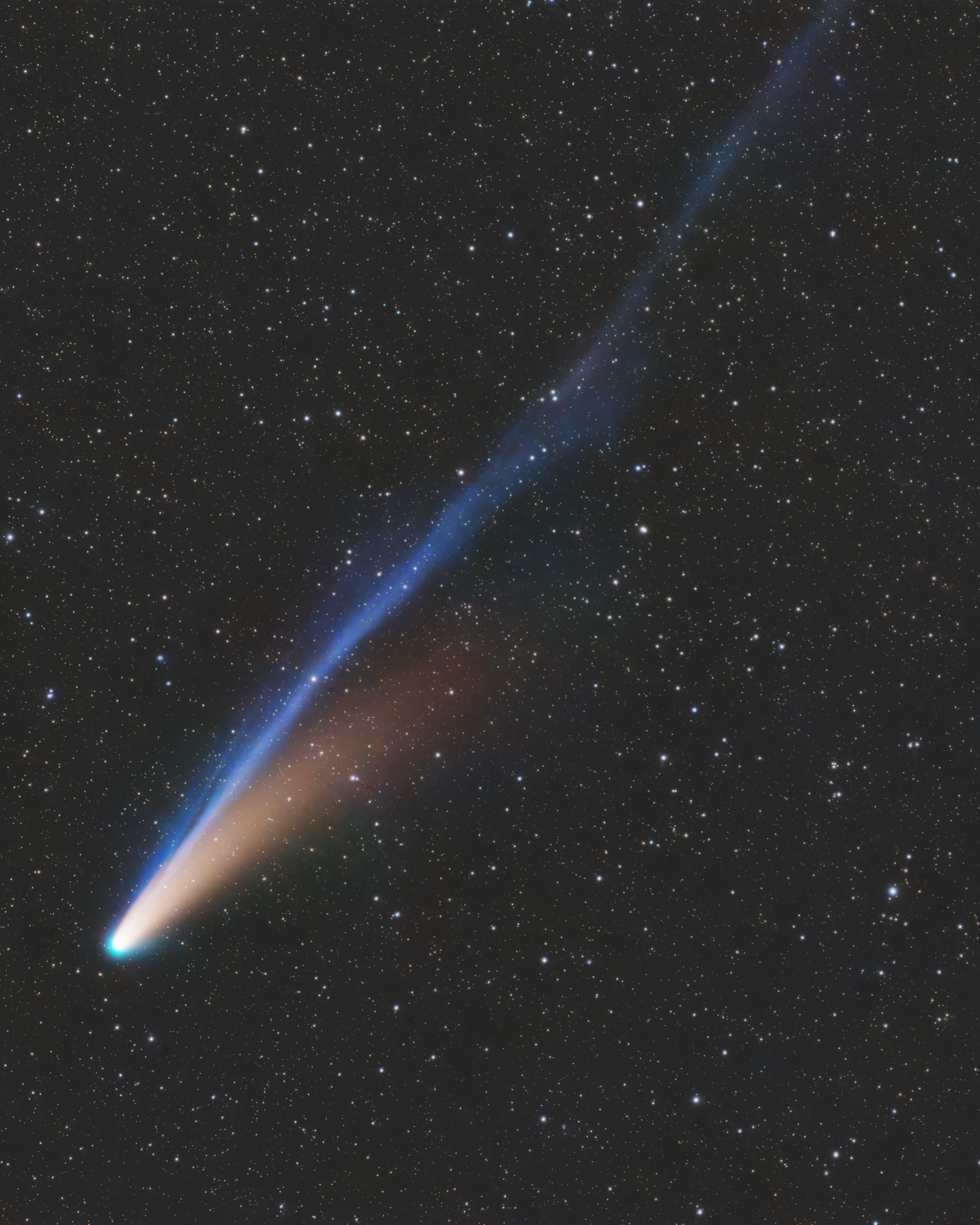
- C/2025 A6 (Lemmon) on 28 October 2025

Discovery
- Discovered by: D. Carson Fuls
- Discovery site: Mount Lemmon Survey
- Discovery date: 3 January 2025

Orbital characteristics
- Epoch: 23 September 2025 (JD 2460941.5)
- Observation arc: 488 days (1.34 years)
- Earliest precovery date: 12 November 2024
- Number of observations: 1,883
- Aphelion: 242 AU (inbound); 222 AU (outbound)
- Perihelion: 0.5299 AU
- Semi-major axis: 121 AU (inbound); 110 AU (outbound)
- Eccentricity: 0.9957 (inbound); 0.9952 (outbound)
- Orbital period: ≈1340 years (inbound) ≈1170 years (outbound)
- Max. orbital speed: 57.8 km/s at perihelion
- Inclination: 143.66°
- Longitude of ascending node: 108.10°
- Argument of periapsis: 132.97°
- Mean anomaly: 359.97°
- Last perihelion: 8 November 2025
- T_{Jupiter}: –0.683
- Earth MOID: 0.309 AU
- Jupiter MOID: 0.571 AU

Physical characteristics
- Comet total magnitude (M1): 10.5±1
- Apparent magnitude: 3.5 (2025-10-24)

C/2025 A6 (Lemmon) is a non-periodic comet discovered by the Mount Lemmon Survey in images obtained on 3 January 2025. It made its closest approach to Earth on 21 October 2025 and was visible to the naked eye.

== Observational history ==
=== Discovery ===
C/2025 A6 (Lemmon) was discovered as an asteroidal object with an apparent magnitude of about 21.5 by the Mount Lemmon Survey in images obtained on 3 January 2025 when it was 4.5 AU from the Sun. Consequently, precovery images by PanSTARRS dating from 12 November 2024 were found. The object was found to have a very condensed coma, 2.2 arcseconds across. A short tail, two arcseconds long was found in images from 21 February 2025.

When first discovered the comet was expected to only brighten to apparent magnitude 10, but brightened to apparent magnitude of about 3.5, which would make it about 400 times brighter than original expectations.

=== Approaching perihelion ===
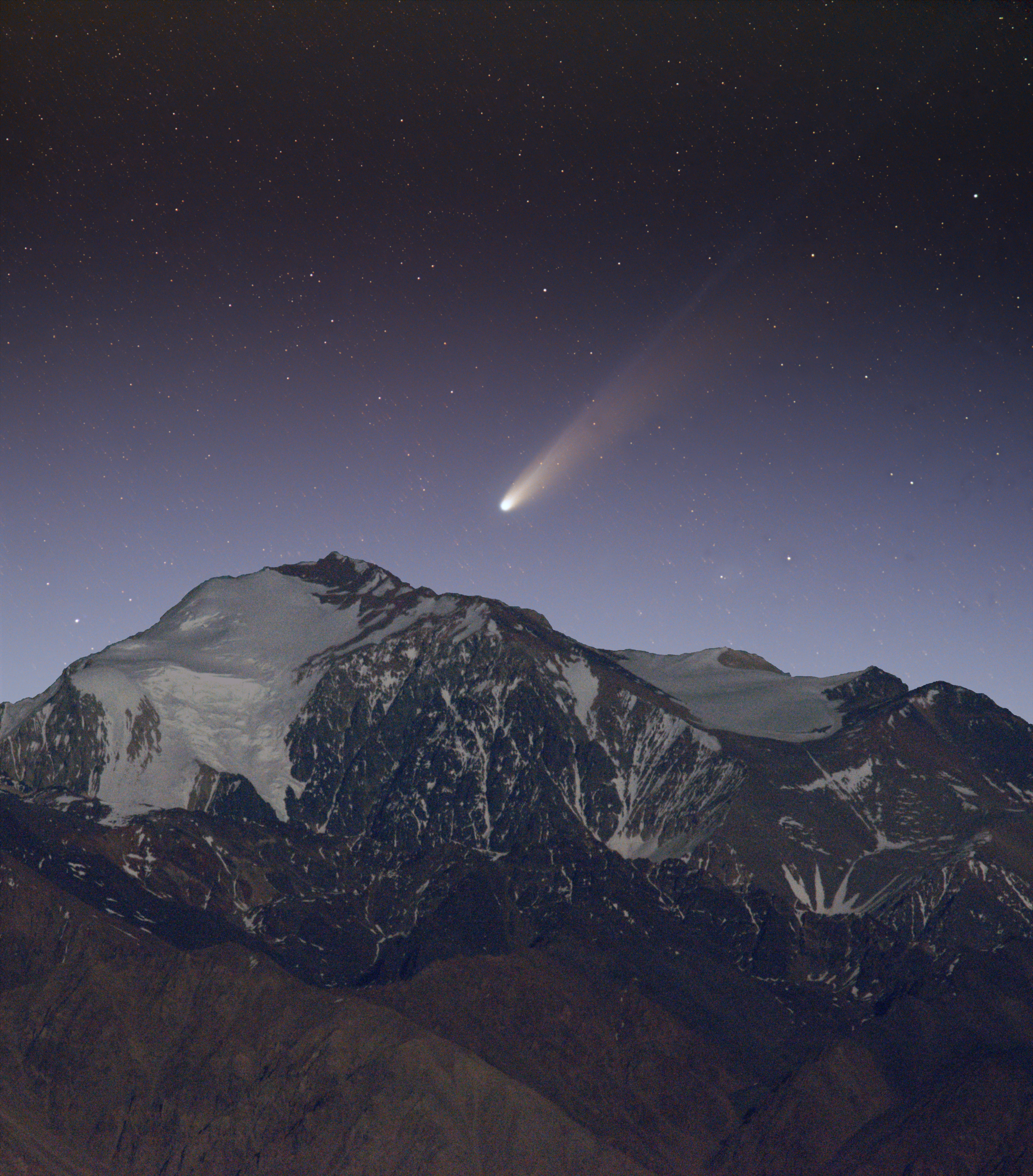
The comet over the Mercedario on 12 November 2025

After being hidden in the Sun's glare during June and July as it came to solar conjunction on 2 July 2025, the comet was spotted again in the morning sky, significantly brighter than predicted. On 12 August the comet had a coma about one arcminute across and an apparent magnitude of 13.9. By August 19, when the comet was 1.7 AU from the Sun, its total magnitude (nucleus+coma) was estimated to be 11, but the comet did not show an obvious tail. A short spiky tail was visible in images from 25 August. The future brightness of the comet is unknown, but the comet is not expected to have been in an outburst when it exited solar conjunction.

The comet in August was located in the constellation of Gemini and on 6–7 September was briefly in Cancer before entering the constellation of Lynx. On September 21 the ion tail was active, with some of twirls and knots, as it interacts with the solar wind and the comet becoming more active as it approaches the Sun. A blob of gas was visible moving away from the head along the ion tail on September 23. By late September it had brightened to 8th to 9th magnitude, being visible with binoculars and small telescopes. On 30 September 2025 the comet had brightened to magnitude 6.6 and photographically the ion tail was about 3 degrees long and there was also a dust tail visible too. The comet experienced a disconnection event on 2 October 2025 as the solar wind stripped away a section of its tail.

Time-lapse of C/2025 A6 (Lemmon) captured in October 2025 showing 55 minutes of movement. The tail can be seen pointing away from the Sun.

In early October it entered Leo Minor and after that Ursa Major and by 10 October 2025 was circumpolar for northern latitudes above 48°N. On 10 October the comet had an apparent magnitude of 5.6 and its coma was 10 arcminutes across. Photographically, its ion tail was 12 degrees long on October 12. The comet was first spotted with naked eye on 15 October, with an estimated magnitude of 4.8, while 50mm binoculars revealed a tail 1.6 degrees long. On 16 October it passed less than a degree from Cor Caroli and moved towards the southeast at a rate of 4 degrees per day.

C/2025 A6 (Lemmon) approached Earth at a distance of 0.60 AU (90 million km; 56 million mi) on 21 October 2025. Around the same time another comet was also visible, C/2025 R2 (SWAN), which made its closest approach to Earth one day earlier. It reached an apparent magnitude of 3.5 to 4.4 according to different estimates, indicating that it could be visible to the naked eye from sufficiently dark skies. During its closest approach the comet was visible in the sunset sky with a solar elongation of 42 degrees. It crossed the celestial equator on 2 November 2025.

== Physical characteristics ==
Between 15 September and 12 October 2025, observations from the Teide Observatory reveal two large spiral jets emanating from the comet, which were likely producing its dust tail as it continues to approach perihelion.

Spectra of the central part of the coma of C/2025 A6 (Lemmon) were taken with the Échelle spectrograph FLECHAS at the University Observatory Jena on 13 and 18 October 2025. In the wavelength range between 4500 and 7000 Å several emission features in the spectra of C/2025 A6 were detected, with those of C_{2}, [OI], NH_{2}, as well as Na being the most prominent ones. The equivalent width of the Na D_{1} and D_{2} emission lines increased significantly between the two observation epochs, while the comet's heliocentric distance decreased from 0.79 to 0.71 AU. By November 2025, the OH-line spectra were detected originating from its coma through the Five-hundred-meter Aperture Spherical Telescope (FAST).

== Orbit ==
Animation of C/2025 A6 around Sun - 2025 close approach C/2025 A6 · Earth · Mercury · Venus · Mars

The comet has an inbound orbital period of about 1,340 years, indicating a previous perihelion in the second half of the 7th century. On 8 November 2025 occurred the perihelion of the comet when it was 0.53 AU (79 million km; 49 million mi) from the Sun. This perihelion passage reduced the orbital period to about 1,170 years. During the 2025 apparition, the comet approached Earth at a distance 0.596 AU (89.2 million km; 55.4 million mi), on 21 October 2025. It also approached Jupiter at a distance of 2.33 AU on 16 April 2025.

== Gallery ==
On 21 October, seen from Tallinn, Estonia

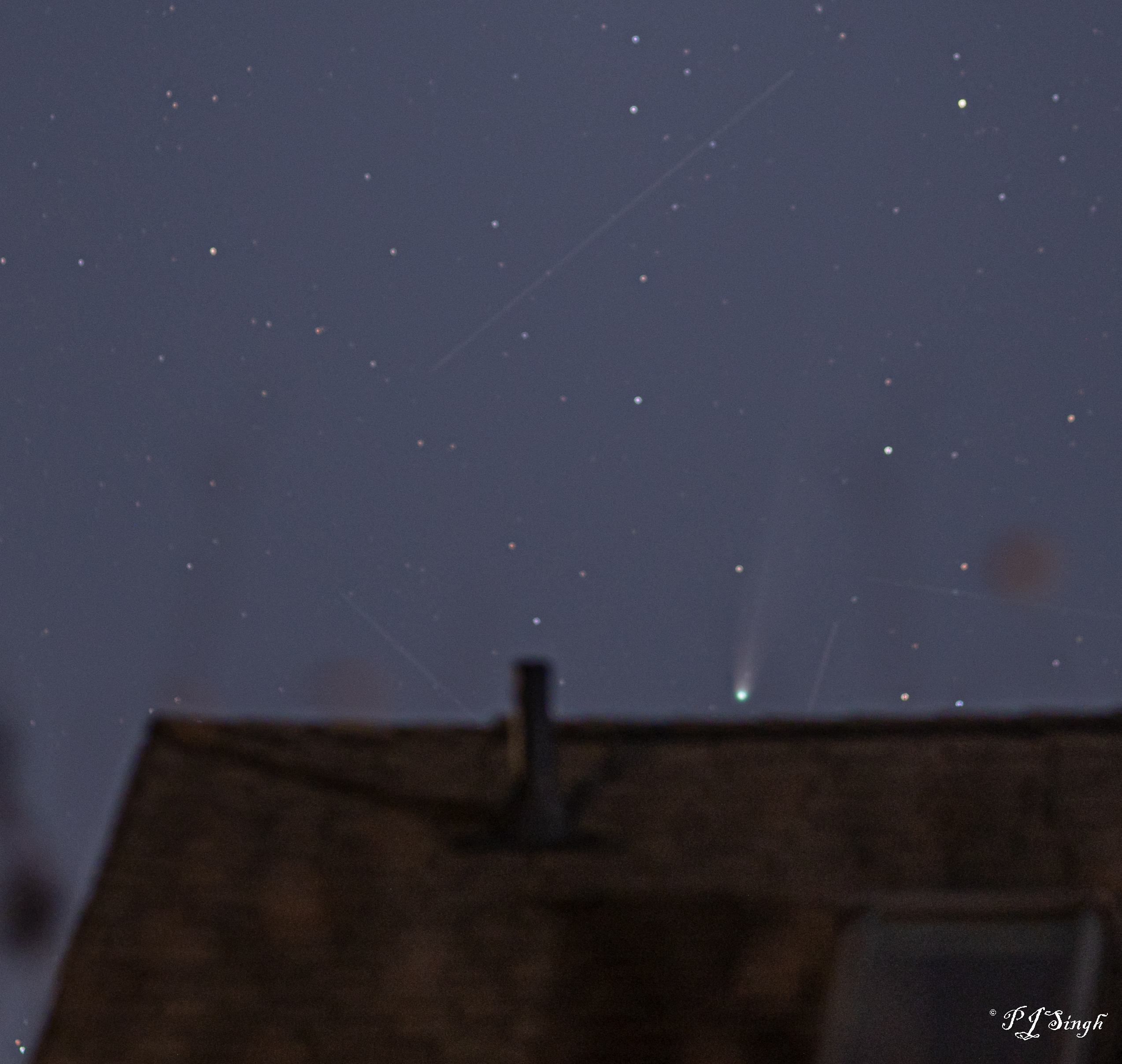
On 27 October, seen from Middletown, New York

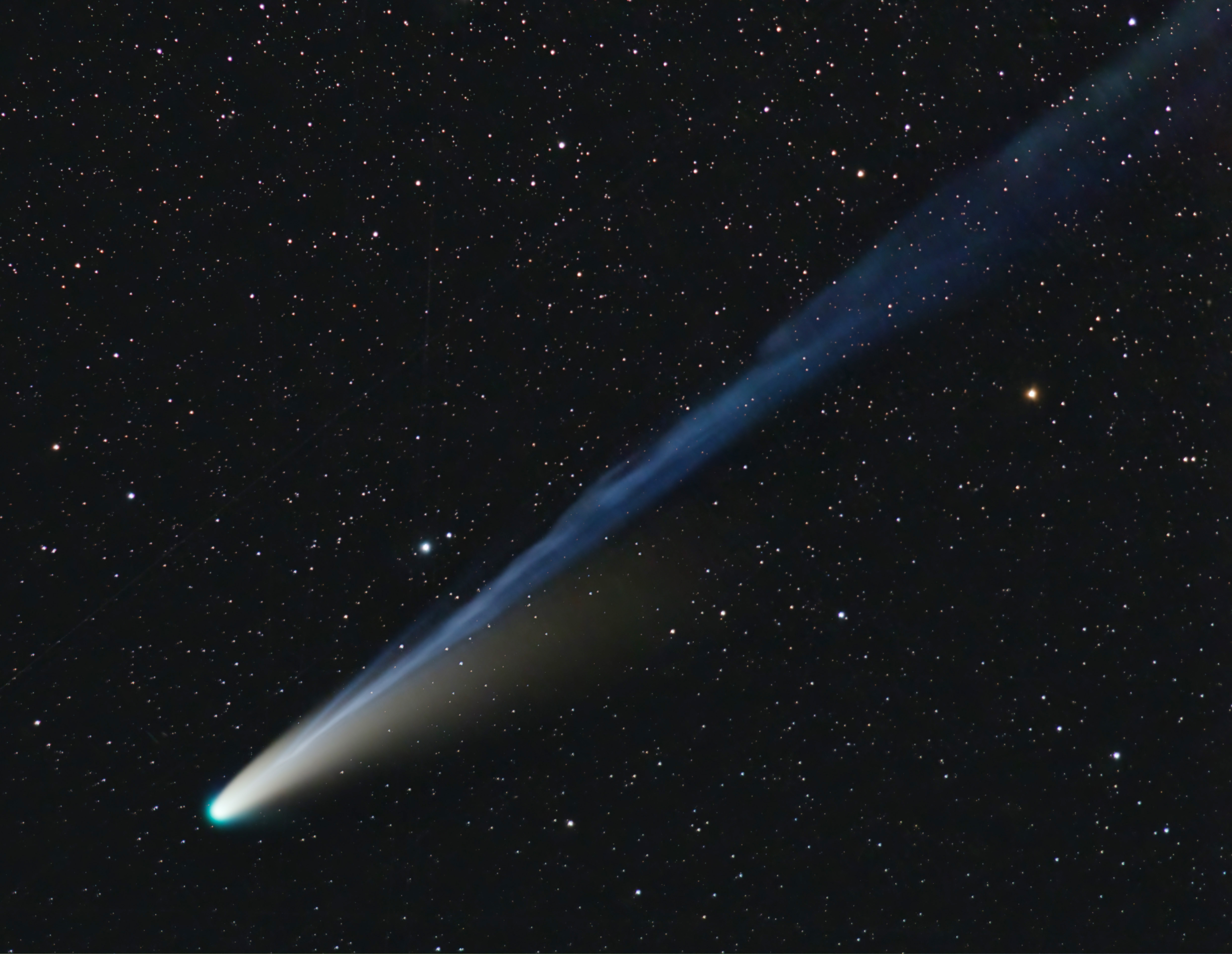
On 28 October, seen from Tecumseh, Michigan

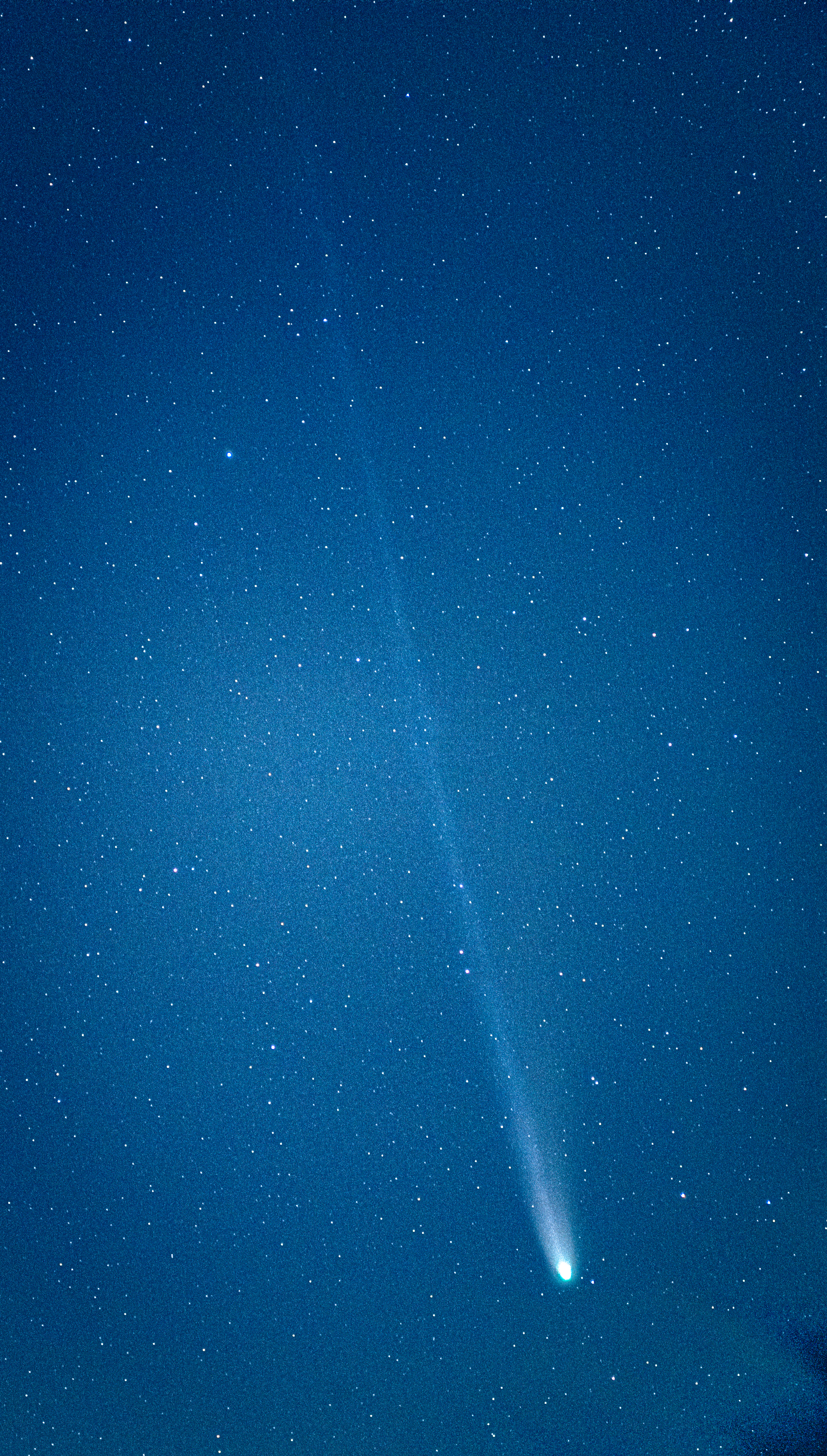
On 30 October, seen from Leipzig, Germany

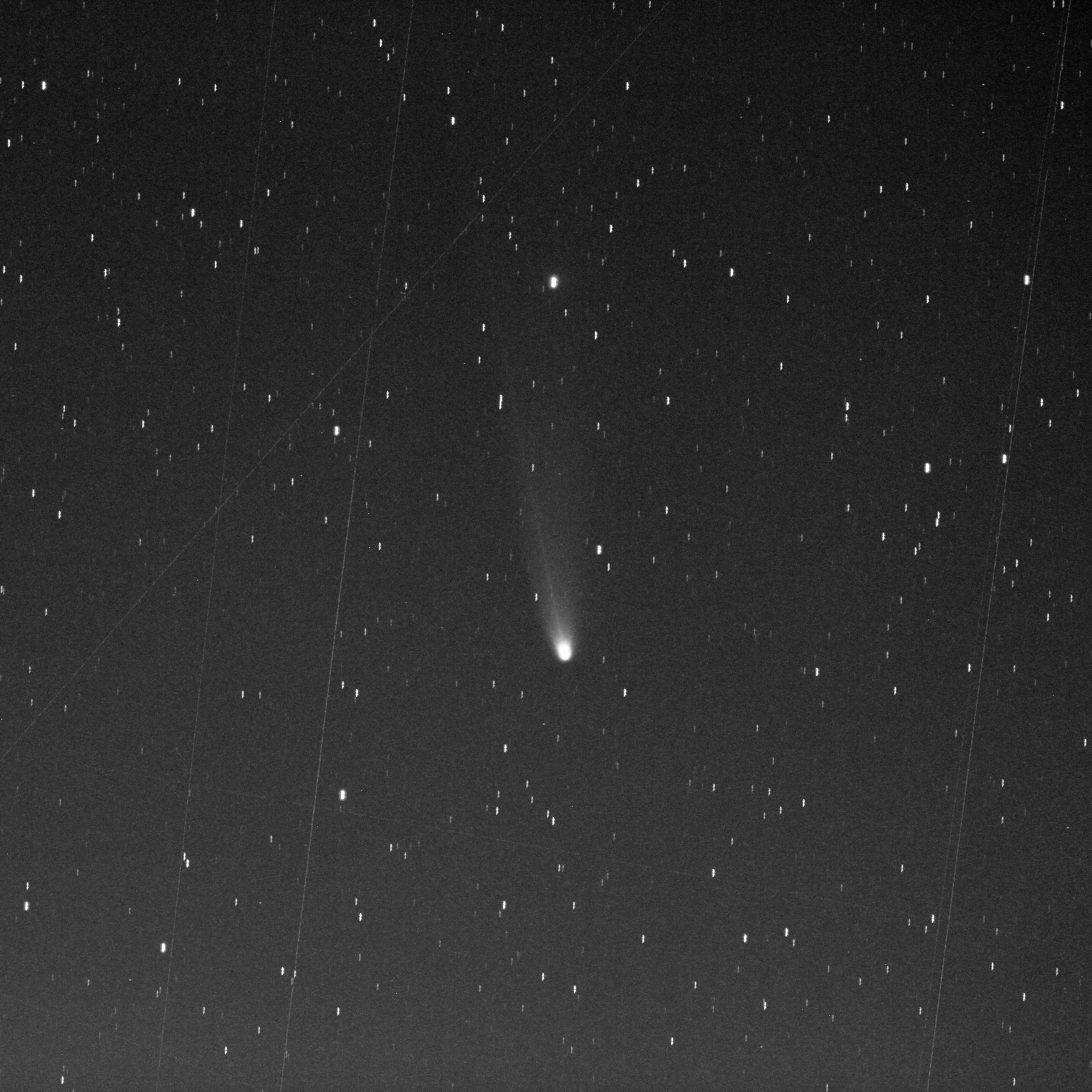
On 1 November, seen from Oria, Italy

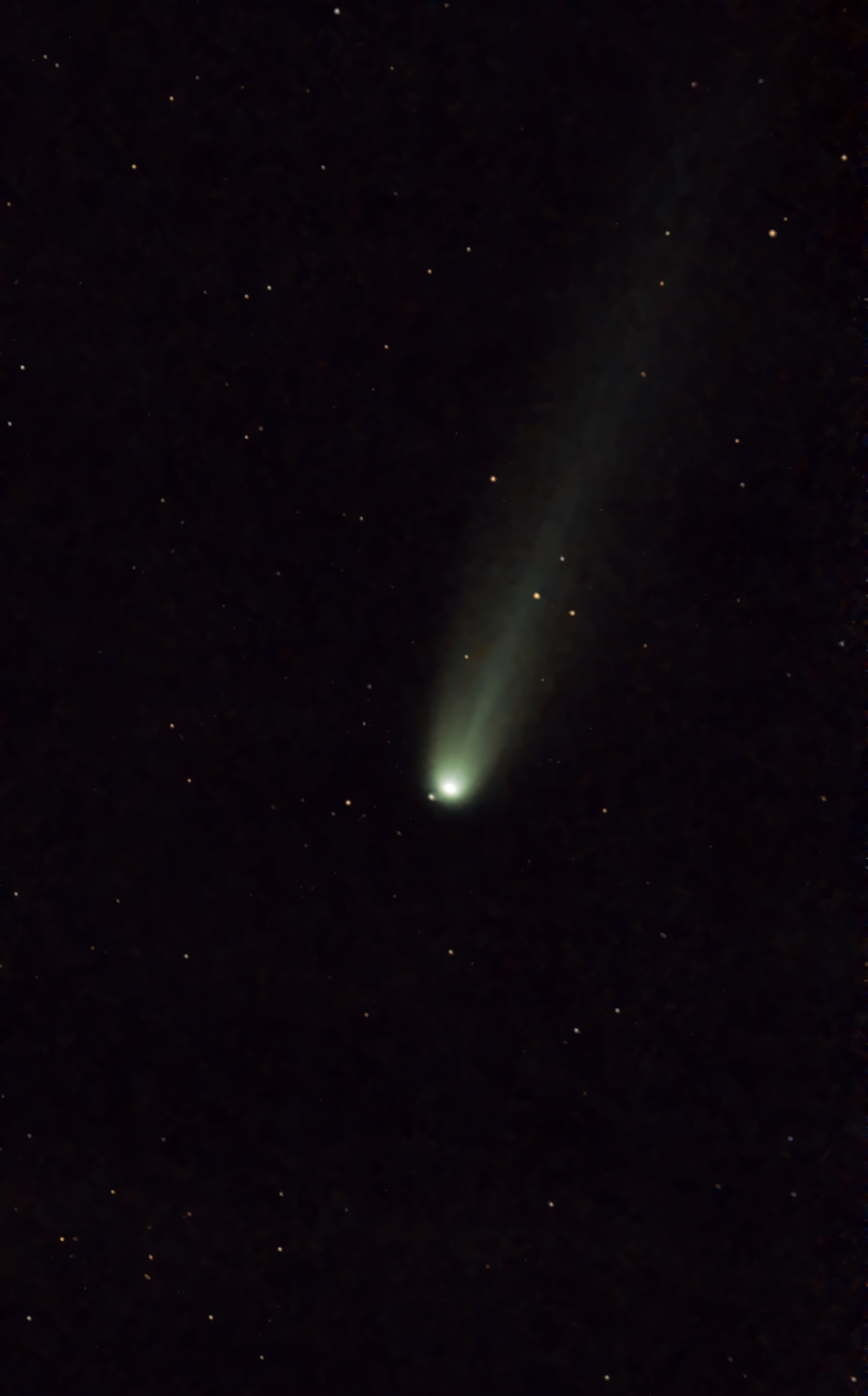
On 4 November, seen from Maharagama, Sri Lanka

== See also ==
- C/2023 A3 (Tsuchinshan–ATLAS) − Also known as the Great Comet of 2024
- C/2024 G3 (ATLAS) − Also known as the Great Comet of 2025
- C/2025 K1 (ATLAS)
- C/2025 R2 (SWAN)
