= S Pegasi =

Variable star in the constellation Pegasus

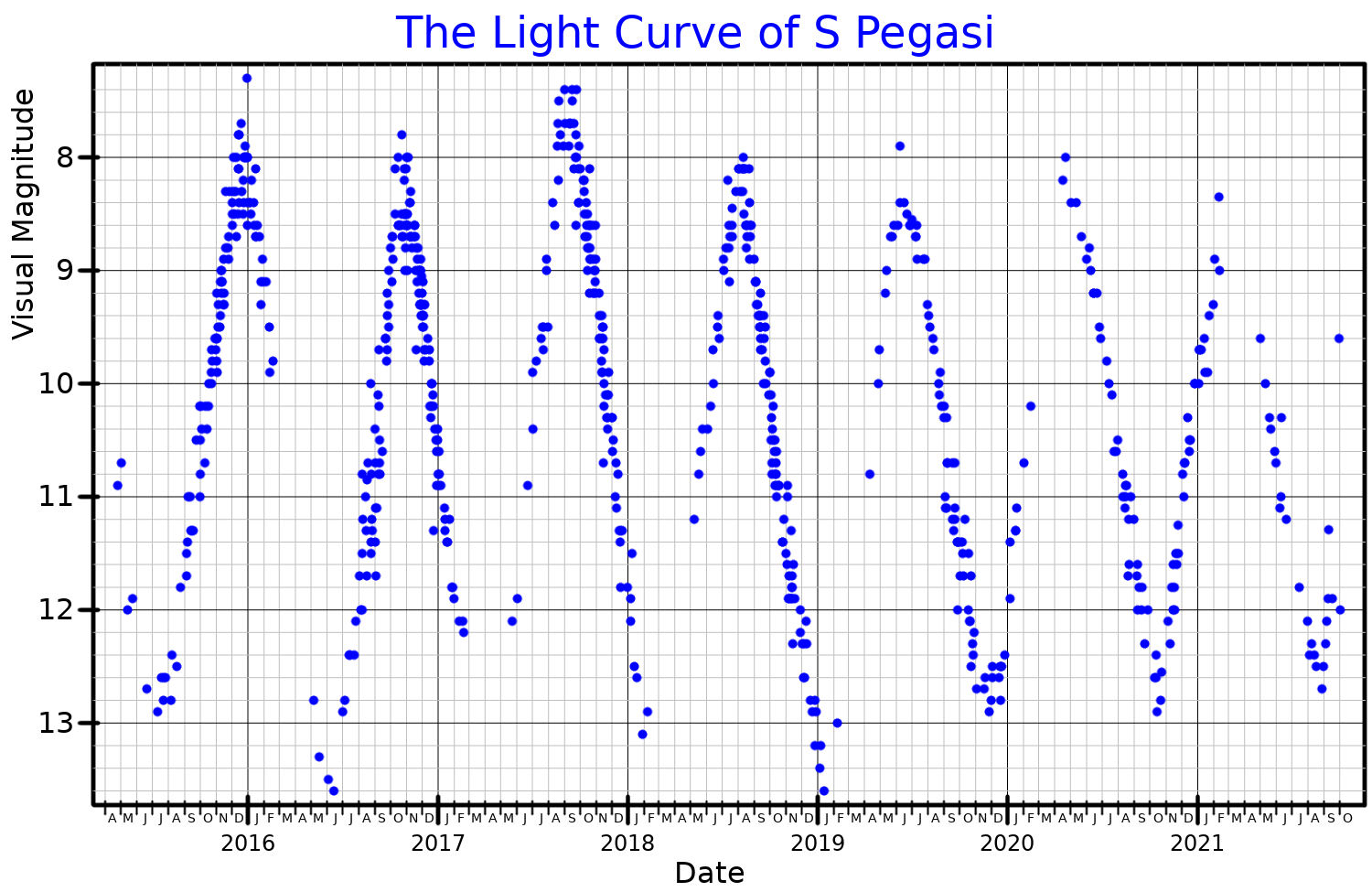
- The visual band light curve of S Pegasi, from AAVSO data

Observation data Epoch J2000 Equinox ICRS
- Constellation: Pegasus
- Right ascension: 23^{h} 20^{m} 32.61474^{s}
- Declination: +08° 55′ 08.1627″
- Apparent magnitude (V): 6.9–13.8

Characteristics
- Spectral type: M5e – M8.5e
- Variable type: Mira

Astrometry
Radial velocity (R_{v})	5.0±4.6 km/s
Proper motion (μ)	RA: −18.494 mas/yr Dec.: −17.197 mas/yr
Parallax (π)	1.399±0.083 mas
Distance	2,300 ± 100 ly (710 ± 40 pc)

Details
Radius	278–316 R_{☉}
Luminosity	6,545+583 −531 L_{☉}
Surface gravity (log g)	−0.45 to −0.39 cgs
Temperature	2,910–2,932 K

Other designations
- S Peg, BD+08°5047a, HD 220033, HIP 115242

Database references
SIMBAD	data

S Pegasi (S Peg) is a Mira variable star in the constellation Pegasus located about 2,300 light-years away. It varies between apparent magnitude 6.9 and 13.8 with a period of 319 days (10 months), representing a nearly 600–fold change in brightness. S Pegasi enters solar conjunction and is hidden by the Sun's glare each year from late February through late March. It reaches opposition in mid-September, when it is visible all night.

It is believed to be pulsating in the first overtone. First overtone pulsators have masses less than 1.8 M_{☉} at a temperature of 2,107 K, and less than 1.4 M_{☉} at the luminosity of S Pegasi.
