= C/2025 K1 (ATLAS) =

Parabolic comet

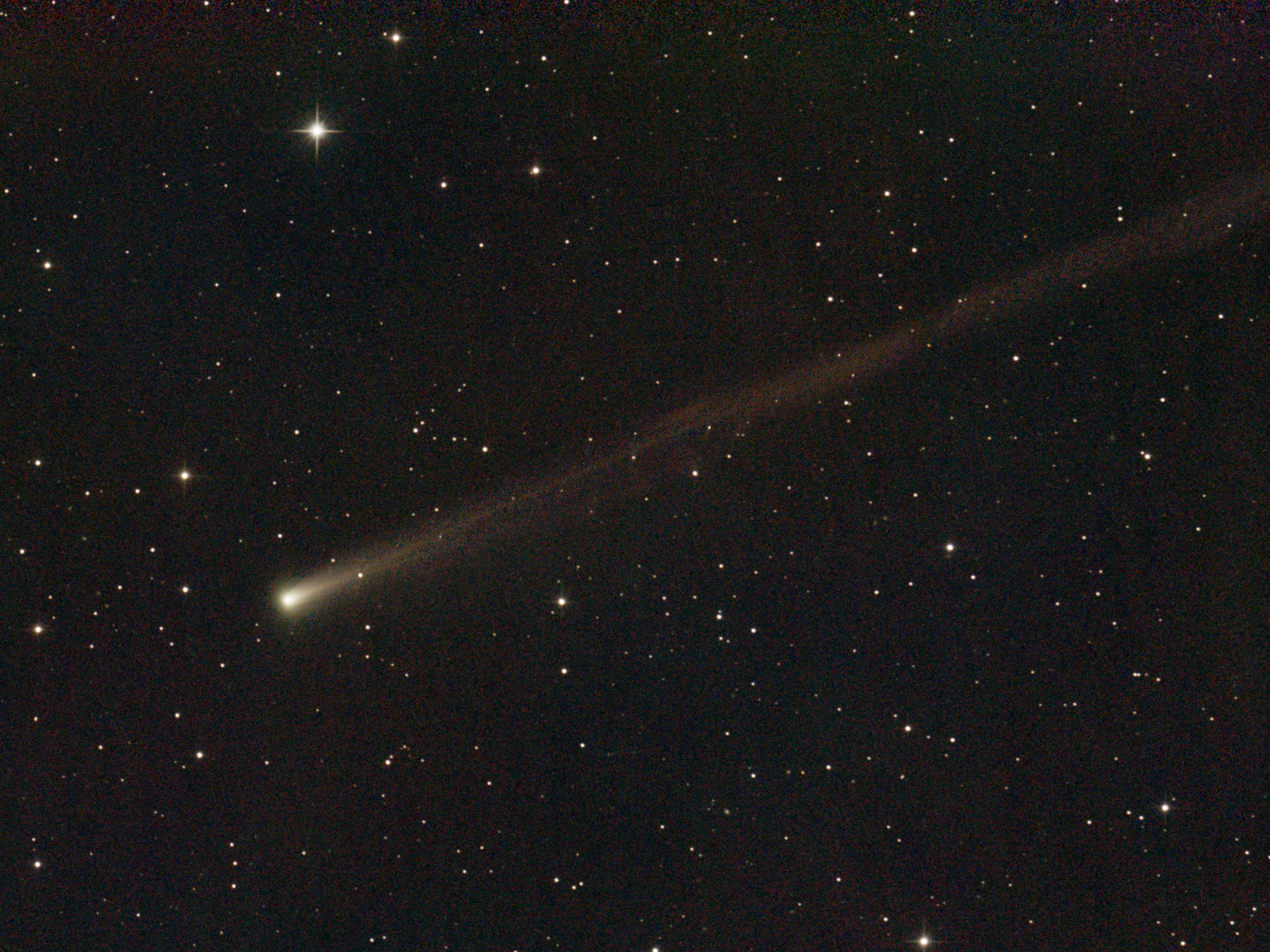
- Comet C/2025 K1 (ATLAS) photographed on 29 October 2025

Discovery
- Discovery site: ATLAS–CHL (W68)
- Discovery date: 24 May 2025

Designations
- Alternative designations: CK25K010, A11nyuL

Orbital characteristics
- Epoch: 22 September 2025 (JD 2460940.5)
- Observation arc: 277 days (A); 62 days (B); 46 days (C); 33 days (D)
- Earliest precovery date: 8 April 2025
- Number of observations: 2,395
- Perihelion: 0.334 AU
- Eccentricity: 1.00001 (inbound); 1.00018 (outbound-A) (Note: At a future epoch of 2200, when fragments A+B+D are outside the planetary region of the Solar System, they will retain a weakly hyperbolic trajectory. Fragment-C will be near parabolic.); 1.00196 (outbound-B); 0.99994 (outbound-C); 1.00239 (outbound-D)
- Orbital period: ejection (outbound A+B+D) ≈449000 years (outbound-C)
- Inclination: 147.86° (A); 147.92° (B); 147.85° (C); 147.93° (D)
- Longitude of ascending node: 97.557°
- Argument of periapsis: 271.02°
- Mean anomaly: –0.000°
- Last perihelion: 8 October 2025
- Earth MOID: 0.161 AU
- Jupiter MOID: 2.31 AU

Physical characteristics
- Mean radius: 1–2 km (0.62–1.24 mi) (Note: Upper limit of the radii of each fragment due to coma contamination)
- Comet total magnitude (M1): 14.2±0.8

C/2025 K1 (ATLAS) is a non-periodic comet first seen in May 2025. It is one of many comets discovered by the Asteroid Terrestrial-impact Last Alert System (ATLAS). The comet is dynamically new, having come directly from the Oort cloud. With perihelion only 0.33 AU (49 million km; 31 million mi) from the Sun, the comet was not expected to survive perihelion passage, but it did and was recovered on 18 October 2025. The comet has broken into multiple fragments and fragments A+B+D should be ejected from the Solar System. Fragment-C may remain bound to the Solar System.

== Observational history ==
The comet was first discovered on 24 May 2025 as an apparently asteroid-like object (temporarily designated as A11nyuL) from the ATLAS facility at Rio Hurtado, Chile. At the time, it was a 19th-magnitude object with a slightly diffuse coma within the constellation Pegasus. (Note: Reported initial position upon discovery was: α = 22^{h} 25^{m} 46.46^{s}, δ = 15° 07′ 01.6″) Observations from the Siding Spring Observatory noted a tail about 7.5 arcseconds long and a coma about 1.5 arcseconds across, brightening up to apparent magnitude 12.1 by 13 August 2025.

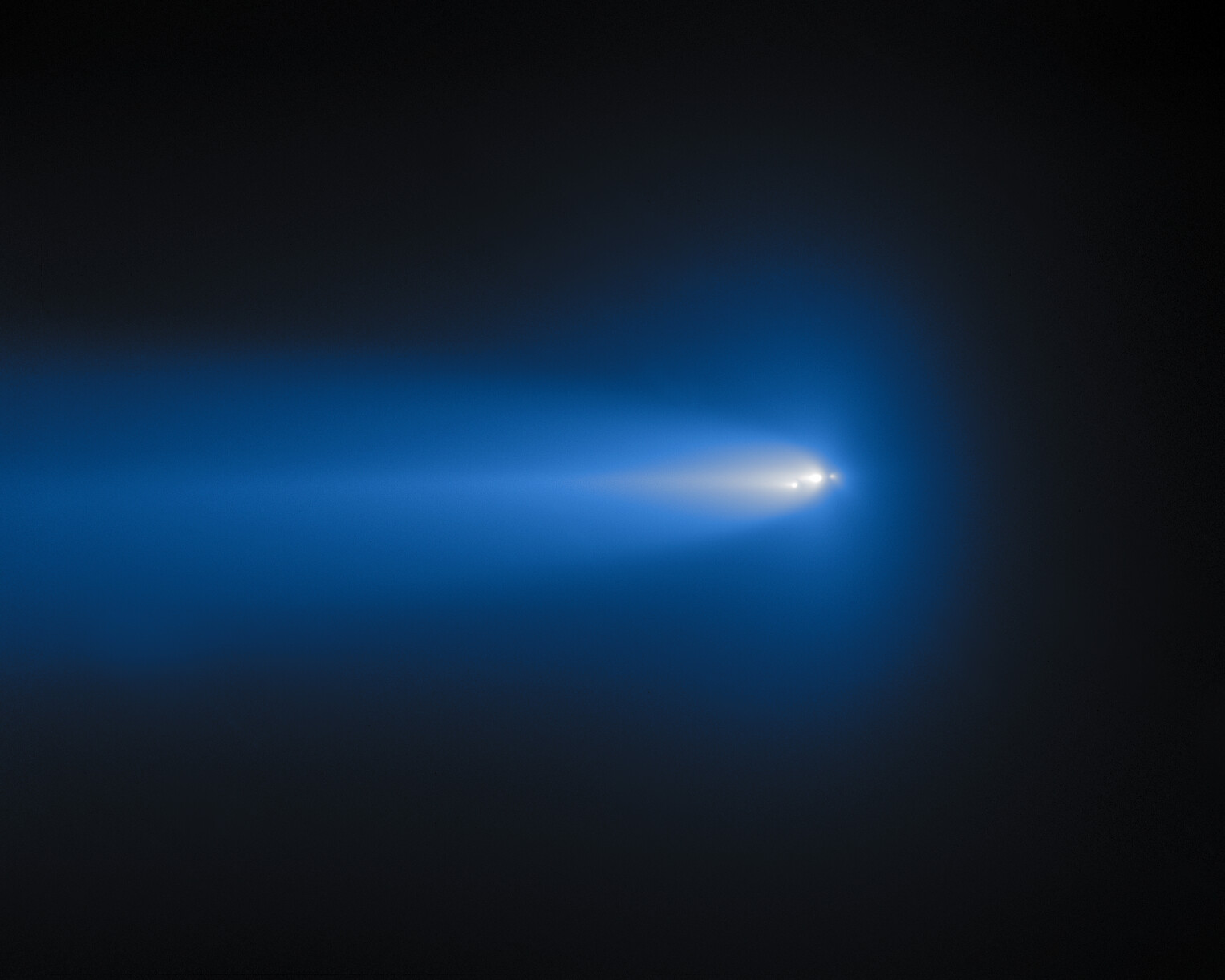
C/2025 K1 (ATLAS) as captured by Gemini North. The comet originated in the Oort cloud and surprisingly survived its closest approach to the Sun in October 2025, but the intense heat and gravity caused it to struggle to hold together, leading to the crumbling visible in this image.

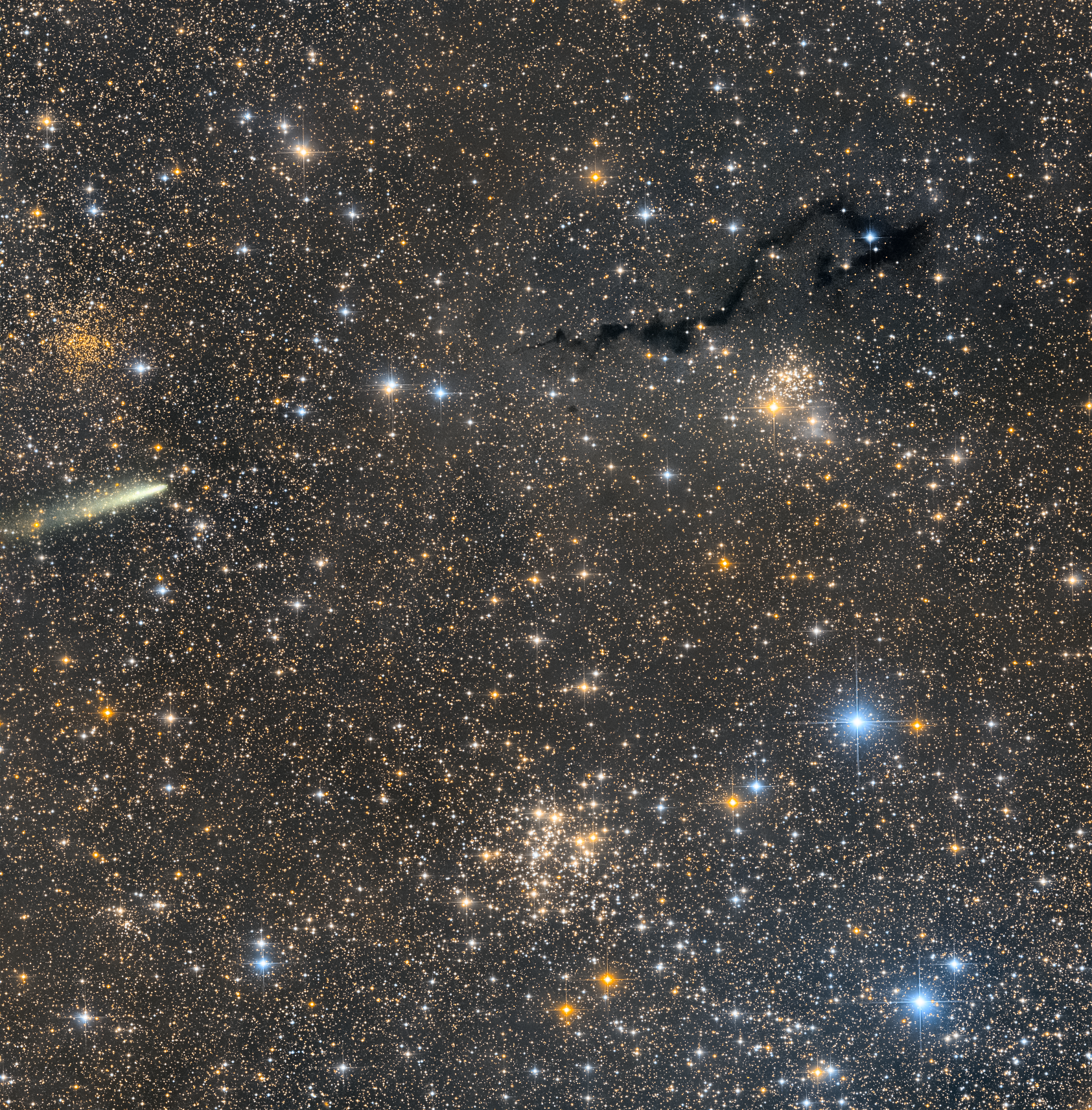
This is C/2025 K1 (ATLAS) on the left as it appeared December 6, 2025. This is a very dense part of the sky also featuring the star cluster NGC 654 in the upper right below the dark nebula. The star cluster on the bottom is NGC 663. The star cluster above the comet is IC 166.

Between 24 and 29 September, the comet was spotted in the same area of the sky from the Earth's perspective alongside C/2025 R2 (SWAN) as it gradually moved within the constellation Virgo. In early November 2025 the comet experienced two apparent outbursts, with the comet brightening by 0.9 magnitude during the largest of which, on 4 November. On the same date, images by ZTF revealed a parabola of a material up to 10 arcseconds from the nucleus that the next day was not present while the tail had become brighter, which is consistent with the material moving tailwards. This outburst later resulted with the comet experiencing a fragmentation event with two visible components. The fragmentation was first reported on the social media groups comets-ml.groups.io and Facebook by F. Kugel, Dauban Observatory MPC station A77 on October 10, 2025. (Image linked externally) and reported by ATel from the Teide Observatory on 10 November 2025. By 13 November 2025, three fragments were visible. By 25 November 2025 a fourth fragment had appeared and fragment-A had brightened significantly, which indicated other fragment(s) could become visible.

On 24 November 2025 the comet passed 0.401 AU (60.0 million km; 37.3 million mi) from Earth, and about 12 degrees from Dubhe in the Big Dipper. Additional observations from the Gemini North telescope in December 2025, and the James Webb Space Telescope (JWST) in January 2026, had detected the second fragmentation event that occurred on the comet's Fragment C.

Images captured by Gemini North on 11 November and 6 December 2025 showed three suspected fragments of the comet's nucleus, each fluctuating in brightness, density, and position from night to night.

Earth approaches on 24 November 2025
Fragment	Time	Earth distance
C/2025 K1-B	2025-Nov-24 17:05:03	0.40175 AU (60,101,000 km; 37,345,000 mi)
C/2025 K1-C	2025-Nov-24 17:05:34	0.40121 AU (60,020,000 km; 37,295,000 mi)
C/2025 K1-A	2025-Nov-24 17:06:43	0.40128 AU (60,031,000 km; 37,301,000 mi)

== Physical characteristics ==
Spectroscopic observations of the comet conducted from the Asiago Astrophysical Observatory between 3 and 15 August 2025 had revealed that its coma is significantly depleted in carbon-chain molecules, especially diatomic carbon (C_{2}). Additional data obtained from the Lowell Observatory on 19 August 2025 indicated it also has very low CN-to-OH and dust-to-gas ratios compared to other comets. So far, only two other comets were known to have such carbon-poor composition, these were C/1988 Y1 (Yanaka) and 96P/Machholz. On 13 November 2025, as the comet was fragmenting, the optical spectrum was dominated by NH_{2} while it was depleted in carbon species. Multiband optical observations from the Gemini Observatory in December 2025 show that the comet fragments have a predominantly blue (g–r) color of ~0.40, which are likely explained by the dust particle size and light-scattering effects.

== See also ==
- C/2025 A6 (Lemmon)
- C/2025 R2 (SWAN)
