= C/1988 Y1 (Yanaka) =

Parabolic comet

Discovery
- Discovered by: Tetsuo Yanaka
- Discovery site: Motegi, Japan
- Discovery date: 29 December 1988

Designations
- Alternative designations: 1988 XXIV, 1988r

Orbital characteristics
- Epoch: 12 January 1989 (JD 2447538.5)
- Observation arc: 57 days
- Number of observations: 56
- Perihelion: 0.428 AU
- Eccentricity: 1.000187
- Inclination: 71.011°
- Longitude of ascending node: 315.52°
- Argument of periapsis: 88.122°
- Last perihelion: 11 December 1988
- Earth MOID: 0.069 AU
- Jupiter MOID: 3.584 AU

Physical characteristics
- Mean radius: 0.194 km (0.121 mi) (Note: Calculated mean radius using the formula: $\log_{10}\,(\,R\,)\ =\;0.9 +\;0.13 (\,H\,)$ Where $\,H\,$ is the comet's absolute total magnitude (M1))
- Comet total magnitude (M1): 12.4
- Comet nuclear magnitude (M2): 17.7
- Apparent magnitude: 9.0–9.5 (1988 apparition)

C/1988 Y1 (Yanaka) is a non-periodic comet that was discovered by Japanese astronomer, Tetsuo Yanaka, in December 1988. Spectral observations of the comet showed that it is depleted in carbon and cyanogen compounds that is typically found in other comets, a trait only shared by 96P/Machholz.

== Observational history ==
=== Discovery ===
Tetsuo Yanaka discovered this comet using a pair of 25 × 150 binoculars on the night of 29 December 1988. At the time, it was a 9th-magnitude object located within the constellation Ophiuchus, (Note: Reported initial position upon discovery was: α = 16^{h} 38^{m} , δ = 1° 02′) where he noted that the comet was probably moving towards the northwest. His discovery was verified by David H. Levy the following night.

=== Follow-up observations ===
Bright moonlight conditions in December 1988 made the observations and orbital calculations of this comet difficult for astronomers. The only known observations made during this time period were conducted by Gary W. Kronk and Alan Hale, who measured the comet's apparent magnitude as 9.1 and 9.4 respectively. A few days later, while searching for C/1988 Y1, Yanaka discovered his second comet, C/1989 A1, on 1 January 1989.

M. Tsumura made the last known observations of the comet on 27 February 1989, where it was a 15th-magnitude object within the constellation Canis Major. (Note: Reported final position upon last known observation was: α = 7^{h} 30.4^{m} , δ = –29° 49′)

== Orbit ==
Brian G. Marsden published the first parabolic orbital elements for the comet on 4 January 1989 based on 8 known observations at the time. Additional parabolic orbits published in 8 January, 26 January, and 22 March all revealed that the comet reached perihelion on 11 December 1988 at a distance of 0.43 AU (64 million km) from the Sun.

No further orbital calculations were published until 2017, when Gary W. Kronk used all 36 observations from 1 January to 27 February 1989 and determined a hyperbolic trajectory with an eccentricity of 1.000187.

== Physical characteristics ==
Measurements of its chemical composition showed that while the comet showed emissions of OI and NH_{2} compounds, it did not display any hints of C_{2} or CN emission by a factor of 100 and 25 respectively. These unusually low production rates in C_{2} and CN emissions were either likely the consequences for being a dynamically new comet entering the inner Solar System for the first time, or it may have even formed from an interstellar cloud with a composition entirely different from the nebula that eventually formed the Solar System.

== See also ==
- C/2025 K1 (ATLAS)
