= C/2025 F2 (SWAN) =

Non-periodic comet

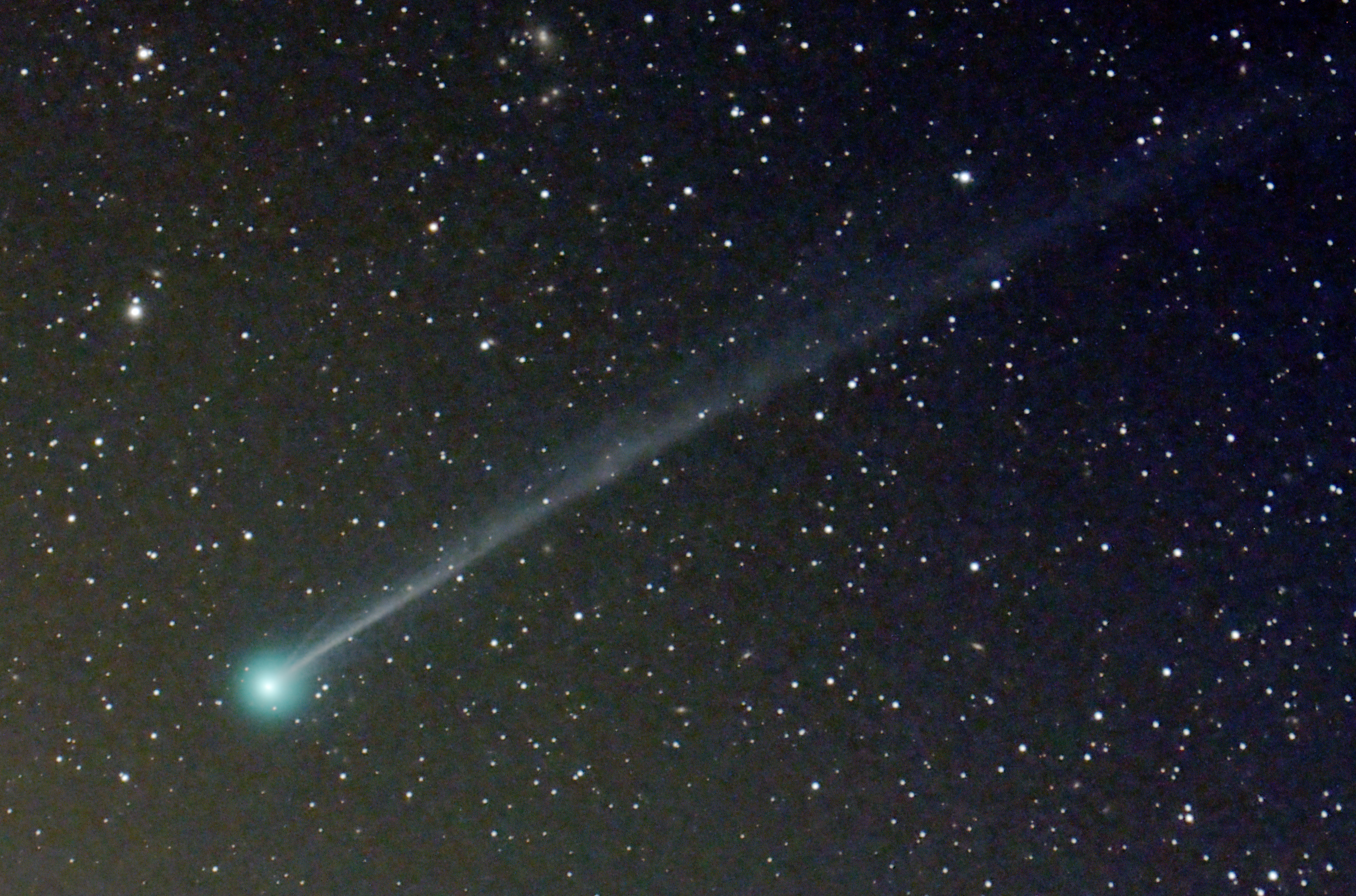
- Comet C/2025 F2 (SWAN) photographed from New Mexico on 8 April 2025

Discovery
- Discovered by: Michael Mattiazzo, Vladimir Bezugly
- Discovery site: SOHO (SWAN)
- Discovery date: 29 March 2025

Designations
- Alternative designations: SWAN25F

Orbital characteristics
- Epoch: 28 March 2025 (JD 2460762.5)
- Observation arc: 223 days
- Earliest precovery date: 3 September 2024
- Number of observations: 352
- Aphelion: ~3,750 AU (inbound); ~33,300 AU (outbound)
- Perihelion: 0.333 AU
- Eccentricity: 0.99999398
- Orbital period: ~81,200 years (inbound); ~2,146,000 years (outbound)
- Inclination: 90.371°
- Longitude of ascending node: 329.84°
- Argument of periapsis: 153.85°
- Last perihelion: 1 May 2025
- T_{Jupiter}: –0.004
- Earth MOID: 0.628 AU
- Jupiter MOID: 0.402 AU

Physical characteristics
- Comet total magnitude (M1): 12.3
- Apparent magnitude: 7.5 (2025 apparition)

C/2025 F2 (SWAN) is a comet that was discovered from images taken by SOHO's SWAN instrument in late March 2025. The comet was expected to reach a peak magnitude of about 5 in early May 2025, however its brightening stagnated in mid April, indicating the comet possibly disintegrated before reaching perihelion.

== Observational history ==
=== Discovery ===
It was first spotted by astronomers Vladimir Bezugly, Michael Mattiazzo, and Rob Matson who independently reported, the former two on 29 March 2025, and the latter on 31 March 2025, that an apparent cometary object was visible in imagery by the Solar Wind Anisotropies (SWAN) camera, which images the sky in Lyman-α, on the Solar and Heliospheric Observatory (SOHO), starting from 22 March. The magnitude was reported to be about 11 and brightening. The comet on 29 March was 1.62 AU from Earth and 0.92 AU from the Sun and at a solar elongation of 28 degrees.

The comet's discovery was posted in Maik Meyer's comets-ml discussion group and led amateur astronomers to gather ephemerides data to further calculate its orbit. The first successful detection reported was by Q. Zhang on 2 April 2025, noting the coma was two arcminutes across. Due to the low resolution of the SWAN camera the original reported coordinates were off by about two degrees.

Precovery images obtained on 26 March by the Xingming Observatory were spotted by G.-y. Sun. The comet had an apparent magnitude of about 14 and its coma was about 30 arcseconds across. Furthermore, the comet was spotted by Robert Weryk in images obtained by PanSTARRS telescopes on 3, 9, 24, and 27 September 2024, and 4 and 6 October 2024, where the comet was a slightly fuzzy object with an apparent magnitude of about 22. The comet was also detected in an image obtained by DECam, at Cerro Tololo Inter-American Observatory, on 8 September 2024 appearing stellar at an apparent magnitude of 22.4 and possibly having a faint tail.

=== Towards perihelion ===
This is a time-lapse view of 'Comet C/2025 F2 (SWAN) - SWAN25F' as it appeared in the pre-dawn hours on 10 April 2025.

On 3 April 2025, the comet was around magnitude 10.6, and Michael Jäger imaged a faint tail about 10 arcminutes long. K. Yoshimoto few hours later obtained images that showed the tail was 35 arcminutes long. Maik Meyer observed the comet visually on April 4 and estimated its magnitude to be 9.2, while noting that its appearance was reminiscent of a well-concentrated globular cluster. The comet underwent an outburst around April 5 and the next day was reported to have an apparent magnitude of 8.6 in images by T. Yusa, while visually the comet was 8.1 to 8.3 mag and its tail was 1.5 degrees long. In images the tail was roughly 2 degrees in length.

At that point it was expected to become a 5th-magnitude binocular object by May 2025, but it could also reach a magnitude of 3.6 on perihelion date, adopting an absolute magnitude of 8.5 and a brightening rate of 2.5n = 10. Further observations are needed to accurately predict its brightness, and the outburst further complicated them.

In early April the comet was located in the Pegasus Square, in east-northeastern horizon before dawn. Consequently it moved in Andromeda, passing near the bright star Alpheratz on 13 April.

=== Disintegration ===
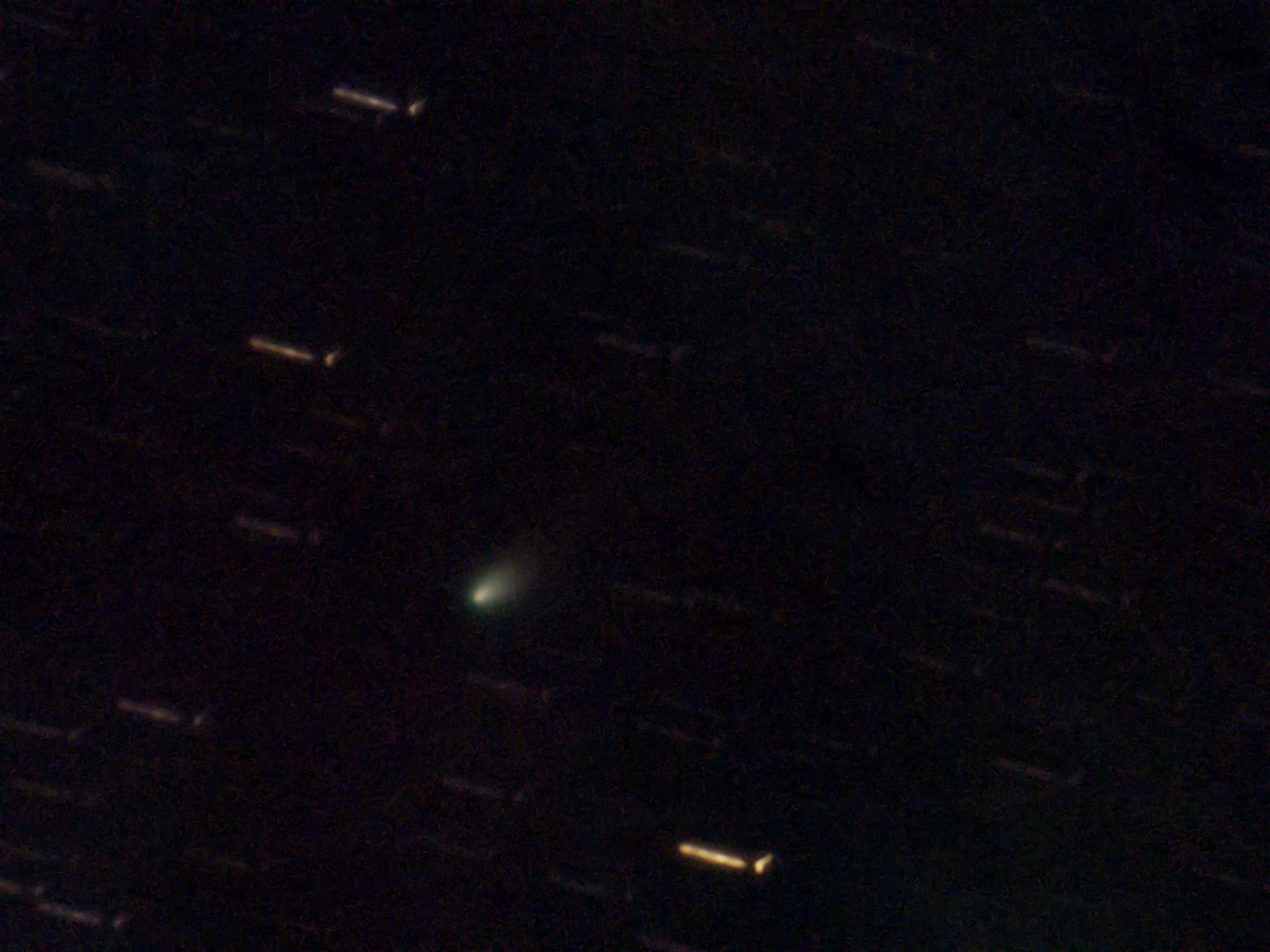
The comet on 17 April 2025, with its nucleus appearing diffuse

In the second half of April the comet faded slightly and appeared to have disintegrated, leaving behind a dust cloud. Disintegration probably started during the outburst which was observed shortly after the discovery. The nucleus had completely disappeared by 22 April, though its fragments managed to temporarily brighten from 10.6 to 9.3. In late April the comet moved to the evening sky, lying low near the horizon. On May 1 it was near the Pleiades. The comet afterwards moved southwards and became better visible from the southern hemisphere after the first days of May.

== Orbit ==
The comet has a nearly parabolic orbit. Using an epoch of 1800 which is well before the comet entered the planetary region of the Solar System, a barycentric orbit solution suggests the comet had an approximately 80,000-year orbital period. Thus, the comet has spent the last 40,000 years inbound from approximately 3,750 AU (561 billion km; 0.0593 ly). After perihelion, the orbital period increases nearly tenfold. The perihelion of the comet is at a distance of 0.333 AU (49.8 million km), near the inner portion of the orbit of Mercury. The comet approached Saturn at a distance of about 0.864 AU (129.3 million km) on 29 January 2023.

== See also ==
- C/2025 R2 (SWAN) – a relatively bright comet formerly known as SWAN25B
