= List of conjunctions (astronomy) =

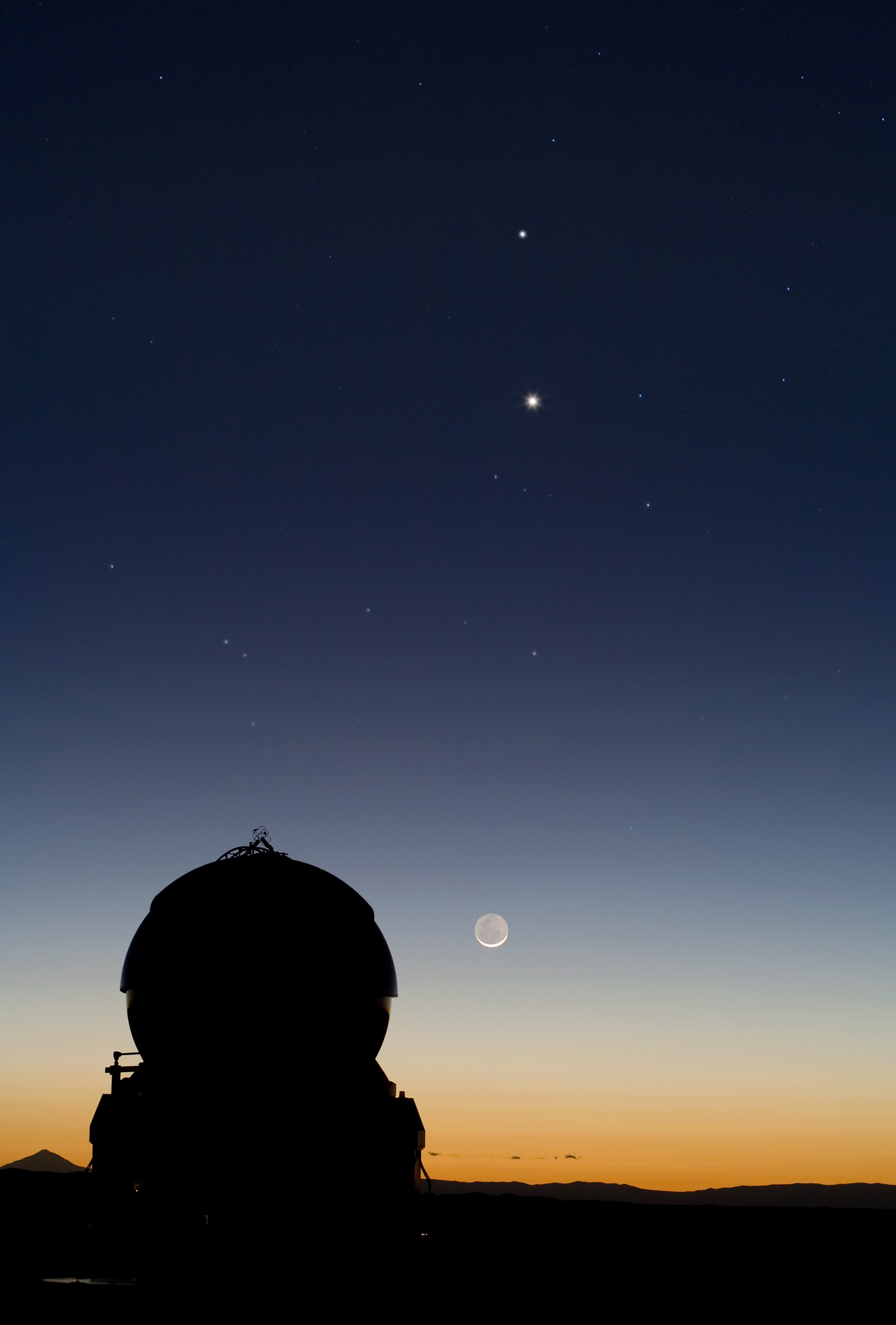
Conjunction of Mercury and Venus, appearing above the Moon, at the Paranal Observatory.

This is a list of the planetary conjunctions visible from Earth between 2005 and 2030.

In astronomy, a conjunction is an event, defined only when using either an equatorial or an ecliptic celestial coordinate system, in which any two astronomical objects (e.g. asteroids, moons, planets, stars) have the same celestial longitude, normally as when observed from the Earth (geocentric).

In the case of a geocentric conjunction of two of the Solar System's planets, since these planets appear to travel "along the same line" (the ecliptic), the two planets appear on Earth as being near one another in the sky during the conjunction.

The conjunctions are listed according to the equatorial coordinate system (in which the celestial longitude is termed right ascension).

The elongation to Sun can determine when and how easily a conjunction will be visible. Those transits with elongation East of the sun are best seen in the morning, and with elongation West of the sun in the evening. This elongation distance must also be great enough that the planets are visible before the sun rises, or after it sets.

== 2005-2010 ==
=== 2005 ===
Date	Time UTC	Planet	Angle distance	Planet	Elongation to Sun
January 4, 2005	07:04:06	Venus	7°27' south of	Pluto	20.8° West
January 5, 2005	00:58:49	Mercury	6°59' south of	Pluto	21.6° West
January 14, 2005	00:40:51	Mercury	21' south of	Venus	18.5° West
January 29, 2005	07:05:35	Mars	8°15' south of	Pluto	45,5° West
February 8, 2005	01:29:22	Mercury	2°04' south of	Neptune	4.2° West
February 14, 2005	19:15:10	Venus	58' south of	Neptune	10.7° West
February 20, 2005	00:46:34	Mercury	1°00' south of	Uranus	4.9° East
March 4, 2005	03:31:36	Venus	41' south of	Uranus	6.6° West
March 28, 2005	22:31:53	Mercury	4°49' north of	Venus	1.5° West
April 13, 2005	00:26:23	Mars	1°15' south of	Neptune	66.0° West
May 14, 2005	20:24:10	Mars	1°11' south of	Uranus	73.8° West
June 19, 2005	21:22:52	Venus	1°18' north of	Saturn	22.8° East
June 26, 2005	06:13:43	Mercury	1°25' north of	Saturn	22.5° East
June 27, 2005	20:18:55	Mercury	5' south of	Venus	23.3° East
July 7, 2005	08:21:22	Mercury	1°38' south of	Venus	25.8° East
September 2, 2005	12:05:52	Venus	1°22' south of	Jupiter	38.7° East
October 6, 2005	07:01:37	Mercury	1°28' south of	Jupiter	12.6° East
October 29, 2005	16:11:20	Venus	11°08' south of	Pluto	46,8° East
December 31, 2005	15:55:12	Mercury	7°36' south of	Pluto	14,9° West

=== 2006 ===
Date	Time UTC	Planet	Angle distance	Planet	Elongation to Sun
January 17, 2006	02:23:03	Mercury	7°53'south of	Venus	6.5° West
February 1, 2006	12:13:51	Mercury	1°57' north of	Neptune	4.5° East
February 14, 2006	15:40:57	Mercury	2' north of	Uranus	14.1° East
March 26, 2006	21:02:41	Venus	1°52' north of	Neptune	46.5° West
April 18, 2006	12:27:31	Venus	19' north of	Uranus	45.0° West
June 17, 2006	22:50:40	Mars	35' north of	Saturn	42.0° East
August 20, 2006	22:40:10	Mercury	31' north of	Saturn	11.2° West
August 26, 2006	23:09:47	Venus	4' north of	Saturn	16.3° West
September 15, 2006	20:32:28	Mercury	10' south of	Mars	12.1° East
October 24, 2006	19:44:11	Venus	43' north of	Mars	0.6° West
October 25, 2006	21:42:16	Mercury	3°56' south of	Jupiter	21.2° East
October 28, 2006	16:32:15	Mercury	3°43' south of	Jupiter	19.1° East
November 7, 2006	13:36:58	Mercury	1°14' south of	Venus	2.8° East
November 11, 2006	17:51:38	Mercury	39' north of	Mars	6.2° West
November 15, 2006	22:52:15	Venus	27' south of	Jupiter	4.8° East
December 9, 2006	20:17:18	Mercury	1°02' north of	Mars	15.1° West
December 10, 2006	16:31:09	Mercury	8' north of	Jupiter	14.8° West
December 11, 2006	23:34:02	Mars	49' south of	Jupiter	15.7° West

=== 2007 ===
Date	Time UTC	Planet	Angle distance	Planet	Elongation to Sun
January 18, 2007	18:10:50	Venus	1°25' south of	Neptune	20.1° East
January 26, 2007	06:46:07	Mercury	1°28' south of	Neptune	12.7° East
February 7, 2007	13:13:57	Venus	44' south of	Uranus	24.6° East
March 25, 2007	07:23:59	Mars	1°00' south of	Neptune	43.2° West
April 1, 2007	06:59:14	Mercury	1°37' south of	Uranus	25.0° West
April 28, 2007	18:57:38	Mars	44' south of	Uranus	50.6° West
July 2, 2007	00:44:38	Venus	46' south of	Saturn	42.6° East
August 9, 2007	08:46:28	Venus	8°29' south of	Saturn	10.6° East
August 15, 2007	22:59:23	Mercury	10°04' north of	Venus	1.8° East
August 18, 2007	11:30:22	Mercury	30' north of	Saturn	3.2° East
October 15, 2007	14:05:43	Venus	2°56' south of	Saturn	45,8° West
December 20, 2007	21:46:21	Mercury	1°48' south of	Jupiter	1,9° East

=== 2008 ===
Date	Time UTC	Planet	Angle distance	Planet	Elongation to Sun
January 23, 2008	04:14:53	Mercury	20' north of	Neptune	18.5° East
February 1, 2008	04:14:53	Mercury	3°11' north of	Neptune	9° East
February 1, 2008	12:35:21	Venus	35' north of	Jupiter	32° West
February 26, 2008	02:34:04	Mercury	1°20' north of	Venus	26.1° West
March 6, 2008	20:14:29	Venus	36' south of	Neptune	24° West
March 9, 2008	02:48:02	Mercury	56' south of	Neptune	26.2° West
March 23, 2008	10:13:50	Mercury	1°03' south of	Venus	20.3° West
March 27, 2008	17:00:46	Venus	45' south of	Uranus	18.6° West
June 8, 2008	00:51:42	Mercury	2°59' south of	Venus	0.3° West
July 11, 2008	06:27:25	Mars	42' south of	Saturn	46.2° East
August 13, 2008	19:02:26	Venus	14' south of	Saturn	18° East
August 16, 2008	00:03:43	Mercury	42' south of	Saturn	16.1° East
August 23, 2008	05:08:57	Mercury	1°15' south of	Venus	20.5° East
September 11, 2008	04:50:56	Mercury	3°34' south of	Venus	25.4° East
September 11, 2008	20:36:33	Venus	20' north of	Mars	25.5° East
September 12, 2008	20:59:16	Mercury	3°26' south of	Mars	25.3° East
September 19, 2008	05:13:06	Mercury	4°08' south of	Mars	23.3° East
December 1, 2008	00:36:13	Venus	2°02' south of	Jupiter	42.7° East
December 27, 2008	01:50:46	Venus	1°45' south of	Neptune	46.2° East
December 31, 2008	05:54:23	Mercury	1°17' south of	Jupiter	18.6° East

=== 2009 ===
Date	Time UTC	Planet	Angle distance	Planet	Elongation to Sun
January 18, 2009	06:19:19	Mercury	3°15' north of	Jupiter	4.7° East
January 23, 2009	15:34:10	Venus	1°24' north of	Uranus	46.3° East
January 26, 2009	18:23:39	Mercury	4°25' north of	Mars	13.5° West
February 17, 2009	09:35:27	Mars	35' south of	Jupiter	18.8° West
February 24, 2009	03:08:31	Mercury	37' north of	Jupiter	24.1° West
March 1, 2009	20:21:59	Mercury	36' south of	Mars	21.8° West
March 5, 2009	00:52:04	Mercury	1°39' south of	Neptune	19.9° West
March 8, 2009	04:18:03	Mars	48' south of	Neptune	22.9° West
March 21, 2009	21:36:59	Mercury	1°24' south of	Uranus	8.3° West
March 27, 2009	11:31:44	Mercury	10°37' south of	Venus	4° West
April 15, 2009	03:46:10	Mars	28' south of	Uranus	30.9° West
April 18, 2009	16:22:43	Venus	5°36' north of	Mars	29.8° West
May 25, 2009	14:20:29	Jupiter	24' south of	Neptune	98° West
June 19, 2009	14:16:32	Venus	2°02' south of	Mars	44.6° West
July 13, 2009	17:22:12	Jupiter	37' south of	Neptune	145.5° West
August 18, 2009	21:20:26	Mercury	3°27' south of	Saturn	25.4° East
September 20, 2009	12:26:59	Mercury	5°24' south of	Saturn	3° West
October 8, 2009	09:19:27	Mercury	19' south of	Saturn	17.6° West
October 13, 2009	15:39:41	Venus	34' south of	Saturn	22.1° West
December 20, 2009	05:35:39	Jupiter	34' south of	Neptune	55.6° East

=== 2010 ===
Date	Time UTC	Planet	Angle distance	Planet	Elongation to Sun
January 5, 2010	07:30:46	Mercury	3°26' north of	Venus	1.7° West
February 7, 2010	22:43:25	Venus	1°04' south of	Neptune	6.6° East
February 16, 2010	21:09:36	Venus	35' south of	Jupiter	8.8° East
February 27, 2010	05:07:37	Mercury	1°48' south of	Neptune	11.9° West
March 3, 2010	22:43:19	Venus	40' south of	Uranus	12.4° East
March 7, 2010	19:00:44	Mercury	1°11' south of	Jupiter	5.7° West
March 15, 2010	17:56:56	Mercury	44' south of	Uranus	1.6° East
June 6, 2010	18:30:37	Jupiter	28' south of	Uranus	75.7° West
August 1, 2010	19:41:06	Mars	1°56' south of	Saturn	51.5° East
August 10, 2010	01:44:26	Venus	3°8' south of	Saturn	44.4° East
August 23, 2010	21:29:05	Venus	2°27' south of	Mars	44.9° East
September 22, 2010	19:53:12	Jupiter	53' south of	Uranus	177.8° East
September 29, 2010	06:21:23	Venus	6°30' south of	Mars	33.7° East
October 8, 2010	14:57:51	Mercury	35' south of	Saturn	6.5° West
October 24, 2010	11:04:41	Mercury	7°11' north of	Venus	4.9° East
November 21, 2010	00:50:16	Mercury	1°41' south of	Mars	18.7° East
December 14, 2010	03:33:06	Mercury	1°02' north of	Mars	12.7° East

== 2011-2020 ==
=== 2011 ===
Date	Time UTC	Planet	Angle distance	Planet	Elongation to Sun
January 2, 2011	13:41:09	Jupiter	34' south of	Uranus	75° East
February 20, 2011	13:50:48	Mercury	1°04' south of	Mars	3.7° West
February 20, 2011	17:08:01	Mercury	1°41' south of	Neptune	3.2° West
February 20, 2011	21:28:33	Mars	38' south of	Neptune	3.4° West
March 9, 2011	18:00:45	Mercury	22' north of	Uranus	11.1° East
March 16, 2011	17:25:56	Mercury	2°20' north of	Jupiter	15.7° West
March 27, 2011	00:37:44	Venus	9' south of	Neptune	36.3° West
April 3, 2011	17:42:55	Mars	14' south of	Uranus	12.4° West
April 10, 2011	20:05:01	Mercury	3°31' north of	Jupiter	2.8° West
April 19, 2011	08:23:49	Mercury	47' north of	Mars	15.4° West
April 22, 2011	18:50:51	Venus	55' south of	Uranus	30° West
May 1, 2011	11:04:55	Mars	24' north of	Jupiter	18.2° West
May 10, 2011	22:46:50	Mercury	2°12' south of	Jupiter	25.3° West
May 11, 2011	09:14:56	Venus	37' south of	Jupiter	25.7° West
May 20, 2011	01:17:23	Mercury	2°21' south of	Mars	22.2° West
May 22, 2011	15:13:00	Venus	1°03' south of	Mars	22.7° West
August 15, 2011	23:17:56	Mercury	6°21' south of	Venus	1.3° West
September 30, 2011	11:07:16	Venus	1°24' south of	Saturn	11.8° East
October 7, 2011	08:58:32	Mercury	1°52' south of	Saturn	6.1° East

=== 2012 ===
Date	Time UTC	Planet	Angle distance	Planet	Elongation to Sun
January 13, 2012	07:07:30	Venus	1°10' south of	Neptune	36.4° East
February 10, 2012	05:19:14	Venus	20' north of	Uranus	41.3° East
February 14, 2012	00:40:40	Mercury	1°18' south of	Neptune	5.5° East
March 6, 2012	23:35:54	Mercury	3°05' north of	Uranus	16.7° East
March 15, 2012	10:37:46	Venus	3°16' north of	Jupiter	44.6° East
March 16, 2012	02:11:51	Mercury	4°36' north of	Uranus	8.2° East
April 22, 2012	02:00:45	Mercury	2°08' south of	Uranus	26.3° West
May 22, 2012	07:12:01	Mercury	24' north of	Jupiter	6.3° West
June 1, 2012	20:40:22	Mercury	12' north of	Venus	6.7° East
August 17, 2012	08:46:15	Mars	2°54' south of	Saturn	60.1° East
October 6, 2012	07:06:36	Mercury	3°29' north of	Saturn	16.8° East
November 27, 2012	05:14:02	Venus	34' south of	Saturn	29.0° West

=== 2013 ===
Date	Time UTC	Planet	Angle distance	Planet	Elongation to Sun
February 4, 2013	16:05:34	Mars	26' south of	Neptune	16.1° East
February 6, 2013	20:41:22	Mercury	28' south of	Neptune	13.9° East
February 8, 2013	21:09:19	Mercury	18' north of	Mars	15.1° East
February 24, 2013	22:31:25	Mercury	4°15' north of	Mars	11.6° East
February 28, 2013	08:10:56	Venus	46' south of	Neptune	6.8° West
March 6, 2013	07:21:59	Mercury	5°20' north of	Venus	5° West
March 22, 2013	18:23:53	Mars	1' north of	Uranus	5.9° East
March 28, 2013	17:14:45	Venus	43' south of	Uranus	0.7° East
April 6, 2013	15:45:52	Venus	42' south of	Mars	2.6° East
April 19, 2013	21:11:39	Mercury	2°02' south of	Uranus	20.3° West
May 7, 2013	22:16:22	Mercury	26' south of	Mars	4.6° West
May 25, 2013	03:52:17	Mercury	1°22' north of	Venus	15° West
May 27, 2013	09:47:09	Mercury	2°22' north of	Jupiter	17° East
May 28, 2013	20:39:31	Venus	1° north of	Jupiter	15.9° East
June 20, 2013	17:37:02	Mercury	1°57' south of	Venus	22° East
July 22, 2013	05:45:11	Mars	47' north of	Jupiter	23.7° West
September 20, 2013	00:14:06	Venus	3°45' south of	Saturn	41.7° East
October 10, 2013	18:40:54	Mercury	5°24' north of	Saturn	23.6° East
October 28, 2013	21:00:50	Mercury	4°06' north of	Saturn	7.9° East
November 26, 2013	03:39:41	Mercury	20' south of	Saturn	17.5° West

=== 2014 ===
Date	Time UTC	Planet	Angle distance	Planet	Elongation to Sun
January 7, 2014	10:28:53	Mercury	6°27' south of	Venus	5.9° East
March 22, 2014	11:38:46	Mercury	1°15' south of	Neptune	25.7° West
April 12, 2014	08:19:49	Venus	42' north of	Neptune	45.4° West
April 14, 2014	16:11:35	Mercury	1°23' south of	Uranus	11.5° West
May 15, 2014	13:14:02	Venus	1°16' south of	Uranus	39.9° West
August 2, 2014	16:39:29	Mercury	58' north of	Jupiter	6.5° West
August 18, 2014	04:08:26	Venus	12' north of	Jupiter	17.9° West
August 27, 2014	13:16:34	Mars	3°34' south of	Saturn	73.6° East
October 17, 2014	08:02:46	Mercury	2°44' south of	Venus	1.7° West
November 13, 2014	09:04:07	Venus	1°36' south of	Saturn	4.8° East
December 2, 2014	09:01:16	Mercury	1°43' south of	Saturn	6.8° West
December 30, 2014	07:25:46	Mercury	3°44' south of	Venus	12.6° East

=== 2015 ===
Date	Time UTC	Planet	Angle distance	Planet	Elongation to Sun
January 5, 2015	16:30:15	Mercury	1°40' south of	Venus	16.1° East
January 19, 2015	21:33:54	Mars	14' south of	Neptune	36.4° East
February 1, 2015	11:31:23	Venus	50' south of	Neptune	23.8° East
February 21, 2015	19:43:28	Venus	28' south of	Mars	28.4° East
March 4, 2015	19:30:15	Venus	6' north of	Uranus	30.8° East
March 11, 2015	19:50:33	Mars	17' north of	Uranus	24.1° East
March 17, 2015	23:40:08	Mercury	1°36' south of	Neptune	19.1° West
April 8, 2015	09:55:57	Mercury	31' south of	Uranus	1.8° West
April 23, 2015	07:09:00	Mercury	1°23' north of	Mars	13.7° East
May 27, 2015	15:20:33	Mercury	1°41' south of	Mars	4.8° East
July 1, 2015	14:17:16	Venus	24' south of	Jupiter	42.2° East
July 16, 2015	04:29:03	Mercury	8' south of	Mars	8.9° West
July 31, 2015	19:47:59	Venus	6°26' south of	Jupiter	19.5° East
August 5, 2015	08:52:16	Mercury	8°11' north of	Venus	13.1° East
August 7, 2015	04:04:09	Mercury	35' north of	Jupiter	14.6° East
August 29, 2015	05:18:53	Venus	9°25' south of	Mars	21.3° West
October 17, 2015	13:50:10	Mars	24' north of	Jupiter	39.8° West
October 26, 2015	08:14:32	Venus	1°04' south of	Jupiter	46.4° West
November 3, 2015	16:08:44	Venus	42' south of	Mars	46.2° West
November 25, 2015	12:33:25	Mercury	2°46' south of	Saturn	4.3° East

=== 2016 ===
Date	Time UTC	Planet	Angle distance	Planet	Elongation to Sun
January 9, 2016	03:57:19	Venus	5' north of	Saturn	36.3° West
March 10, 2016	22:12:11	Mercury	1°30' south of	Neptune	10.9° West
March 20, 2016	13:51:16	Venus	32' south of	Neptune	20.1° West
March 31, 2016	23:41:55	Mercury	38' north of	Uranus	8.3° East
April 22, 2016	14:17:27	Venus	52' south of	Uranus	11.7° West
May 13, 2016	20:49:07	Mercury	26' south of	Venus	6.5° West
July 16, 2016	17:39:09	Mercury	32' north of	Venus	10.9° East
August 25, 2016	17:52:42	Mars	4°23' south of	Saturn	97° East
August 27, 2016	04:57:57	Mercury	5°16' south of	Venus	22.1° East
August 27, 2016	21:47:56	Venus	4' north of	Jupiter	22.3° East
October 11, 2016	04:17:47	Mercury	52' north of	Jupiter	11.5° West
October 30, 2016	08:25:30	Venus	3°02' south of	Saturn	36.9° East
November 24, 2016	00:38:02	Mercury	3°28' south of	Saturn	14.8° East

=== 2017 ===
Date	Time UTC	Planet	Angle distance	Planet	Elongation to Sun
January 1, 2017	06:46:46	Mars	1' south of	Neptune	58.7° East
January 13, 2017	01:46:45	Venus	25' north of	Neptune	47° East
February 27, 2017	08:20:34	Mars	37' north of	Uranus	43.1° East
March 4, 2017	05:34:17	Mercury	1°08' south of	Neptune	2.2° West
March 16, 2017	23:21:32	Mercury	9°33' south of	Venus	9.5° East
March 27, 2017	05:55:27	Mercury	2°25' north of	Uranus	16.7° East
April 28, 2017	17:52:58	Mercury	9' south of	Uranus	13.4° West
May 7, 2017	23:22:48	Mercury	2°14' south of	Uranus	21.8° West
June 2, 2017	14:41:15	Venus	1°47' south of	Uranus	45.2° West
June 28, 2017	18:17:30	Mercury	47' north of	Mars	8.7° East
September 2, 2017	00:07:46	Mercury	4°06' south of	Mars	10.8° West
September 16, 2017	18:23:28	Mercury	3' north of	Mars	16.9° West
October 5, 2017	13:25:48	Venus	13' north of	Mars	23.4° West
October 18, 2017	14:56:38	Mercury	1°01' south of	Jupiter	6.4° East
November 13, 2017	06:10:03	Venus	17' north of	Jupiter	13.8° West
November 28, 2017	09:36:06	Mercury	3°03' south of	Saturn	21.1° East
December 6, 2017	11:29:41	Mercury	1°21' south of	Saturn	13.9° East
December 15, 2017	16:04:48	Mercury	2°14' north of	Venus	5.9° West
December 25, 2017	17:49:20	Venus	1°08' south of	Saturn	3.5° West

=== 2018 ===
Date	Time UTC	Planet	Angle distance	Planet	Elongation to Sun
January 7, 2018	03:40:50	Mars	13' south of	Jupiter	58.8° West
February 21, 2018	14:19:55	Venus	35' south of	Neptune	10.5° East
February 25, 2018	10:07:00	Mercury	29' south of	Neptune	6.9° East
March 5, 2018	18:28:59	Mercury	1°24' north of	Venus	13.4° East
March 18, 2018	01:16:29	Mercury	3°53' north of	Venus	16.4° East
March 29, 2018	0:13:21	Venus	4' south of	Uranus	19° East
April 2, 2018	11:53:07	Mars	1°16' south of	Saturn	93.7° West
May 12, 2018	21:01:21	Mercury	2°24' south of	Uranus	22.2° West
October 14, 2018	15:20:14	Mercury	6°49' north of	Venus	15.8° East
October 30, 2018	03:38:40	Mercury	3°16' south of	Jupiter	21.3° East
December 7, 2018	14:55:51	Mars	2' south of	Neptune	88.3° East
December 21, 2018	14:43:16	Mercury	52' north of	Jupiter	20.1° West

=== 2019 ===
Date	Time GMT	Planet	Angle distance	Planet	Elongation to Sun
January 13, 2019	10:48:09	Mercury	1°43' south of	Saturn	10.1° West
January 22, 2019	05:47:42	Venus	2°26' north of	Jupiter	45.9° West
February 13, 2019	20:06:54	Mars	1°03' north of	Uranus	64.4° East
February 18, 2019	13:54:15	Venus	1°05' north of	Saturn	42.7° West
February 19, 2019	11:09:52	Mercury	46' north of	Neptune	15.1° East
March 22, 2019	06:18:30	Mercury	3°24' north of	Neptune	13.5° West
April 2, 2019	18:54:11	Mercury	23' north of	Neptune	25.5° West
April 10, 2019	03:52:24	Venus	18' south of	Neptune	32.6° West
May 8, 2019	08:12:50	Mercury	1°23' south of	Uranus	14.1° West
May 18, 2019	08:12:13	Venus	1°09' south of	Uranus	23.2° West
June 19, 2019	14:34:40	Mercury	14' north of	Mars	24.4° East
July 7, 2019	13:33:33	Mercury	3°50' south of	Mars	18.4° East
July 24, 2019	10:32:05	Mercury	5°43' south of	Venus	5.8° West
August 24, 2019	12:34:05	Venus	19' north of	Mars	3.1° East
September 3, 2019	10:44:25	Mercury	42' north of	Mars	1.1° West
September 13, 2019	21:35:21	Mercury	20' south of	Venus	8.5° East
October 30, 2019	08:29:03	Mercury	2°43' south of	Venus	20.3° East
November 24, 2019	14:00:35	Venus	1°24' south of	Jupiter	26.2° East
December 11, 2019	04:42:34	Venus	1°49' south of	Saturn	30° East

=== 2020 ===
Date	Time GMT	Planet	Angle distance	Planet	Elongation to Sun
January 27, 2020	19:21	Venus	0°04' south of	Neptune	39.5° East
March 9, 2020	14:36	Venus	2°24' north of	Uranus	45.4° East
March 20, 2020	06:21	Mars	0°42' south of	Jupiter	67.4° West
March 31, 2020	11:56	Mars	0°55' south of	Saturn	70.6° West
April 3, 2020	16:17	Mercury	1°24' south of	Neptune	25.9° West
May 22, 2020	08:44	Mercury	0°53' south of	Venus	18.4° East
June 12, 2020	13:18	Mars	1°44' south of	Neptune	91.5° east
December 21, 2020	18:20	Jupiter	0°06' south of	Saturn	31° East

== 2021-2030 ==
=== 2021 ===
Date	Time GMT	Planet	Angle distance	Planet	Elongation to Sun
January 10, 2021	03:14	Mercury	1°37' south of	Saturn	12.67° East
January 20, 2021	20:34	Mars	1°37' north of	Uranus	95.73° East
February 06, 2021	07:02	Venus	0°23' south of	Saturn	11.83° West
February 11, 2021	15:02	Venus	0°26' south of	Jupiter	10.56° West
March 05, 2021	03:31	Mercury	0°20' north of	Jupiter	27.23° West
March 14, 2021	04:08	Venus	0°22' south of	Neptune	3.3° West
March 30, 2021	03:23	Mercury	1°17' south of	Neptune	18.39° West
April 23, 2021	01:02	Venus	0°14' south of	Uranus	7.15° East
April 24, 2021	06:42	Mercury	0°45' north of	Uranus	6.0° East
May 29, 2021	05:12	Mercury	0°25' south of	Venus	16.64° East
July 13, 2021	13:31	Venus	0°28' north of	Mars	28.47° East
August 19, 2021	03:27	Mercury	0°04' south of	Mars	16.44° East

=== 2022 ===
Date	Time GMT	Planet	Angle distance	Planet	Elongation to Sun
March 02, 2022	16:26	Mercury	0°40' south of	Saturn	23.11° West
March 06, 2022	07:00	Venus	4°31' north of	Mars	45.72° West
March 21, 2022	06:09	Mercury	1°10' south of	Jupiter	11.97° West
March 23, 2022	17:44	Mercury	0°56' south of	Neptune	9.94° West
March 28, 2022	19:18	Venus	2°07' north of	Saturn	46.36° West
April 05, 2022	01:39	Mars	0°18' south of	Saturn	52.87° West
April 12, 2022	14:16	Jupiter	0°06' north of	Neptune	28.7° West
April 18, 2022	04:51	Mercury	1°59' north of	Uranus	15.71° East
April 27, 2022	19:11	Venus	0°00' south of	Neptune	43.05° West
April 30, 2022	21:19	Venus	0°14' south of	Jupiter	42.55° West
May 18, 2022	06:36	Mars	0°31' south of	Neptune	62.34° West
May 29, 2022	10:46	Mars	0°35' south of	Jupiter	64.74° West
June 11, 2022	22:58	Venus	1°32' south of	Uranus	34.15° West
August 02, 2022	00:02	Mars	1°19' south of	Uranus	81.01° West
November 21, 2022	22:54	Mercury	1°18' south of	Venus	7.6° East

=== 2023 ===
Date	Time GMT	Planet	Angle distance	Planet	Elongation to Sun
January 22, 2023	22:03	Venus	0°21' south of	Saturn	22.21° East
February 15, 2023	12:26	Venus	0°01' south of	Neptune	27.55° East
March 02, 2023	05:43	Venus	0°29' north of	Jupiter	30.79° East
March 02, 2023	14:26	Mercury	0°52' south of	Saturn	12.46° West
March 16, 2023	17:12	Mercury	0°23' south of	Neptune	1.53° West
March 28, 2023	06:54	Mercury	1°17' north of	Jupiter	10.93° East
March 30, 2023	22:25	Venus	1°13' north of	Uranus	36.8° East
June 04, 2023	19:48	Mercury	2°44' south of	Uranus	23.63° West
July 27, 2023	15:14	Mercury	5°05' north of	Venus	24.04° East
October 29, 2023	14:19	Mercury	0°20' south of	Mars	6.0° East

=== 2024 ===
Date	Time GMT	Planet	Angle distance	Planet	Elongation to Sun
January 27, 2024	14:55	Mercury	0°15' north of	Mars	19.87° West
February 22, 2024	07:08	Venus	0°38' north of	Mars	26.2° West
February 28, 2024	15:00	Mercury	0°11' south of	Saturn	1.73° East
March 08, 2024	15:06	Mercury	0°26' north of	Neptune	8.55° East
March 21, 2024	22:58	Venus	0°19' north of	Saturn	19.44° West
April 03, 2024	13:10	Venus	0°16' south of	Neptune	16.32° West
April 10, 2024	20:21	Mars	0°26' north of	Saturn	36.8° West
April 21, 2024	01:49	Jupiter	0°30' south of	Uranus	20.38° East
April 29, 2024	04:34	Mars	0°02' south of	Neptune	40.5° West
May 18, 2024	11:38	Venus	0°27' south of	Uranus	4.65° West
May 23, 2024	08:33	Venus	0°11' north of	Jupiter	3.38° West
May 31, 2024	05:52	Mercury	1°17' south of	Uranus	16.18° West
June 04, 2024	10:25	Mercury	0°07' south of	Jupiter	12.1° West
June 17, 2024	12:41	Mercury	0°53' north of	Venus	3.65° East
July 15, 2024	14:03	Mars	0°32' south of	Uranus	57.25° West
August 14, 2024	15:31	Mars	0°18' north of	Jupiter	65.65° West

=== 2025 ===
Date	Time GMT	Planet	Angle distance	Planet	Elongation to Sun
January 19, 2025	01:15	Venus	2°12' north of	Saturn	46.89° East
February 25, 2025	11:57	Mercury	1°27' north of	Saturn	13.2° East
April 17, 2025	04:12	Mercury	0°42' south of	Neptune	26.81° West
May 02, 2025	17:07	Venus	2°06' north of	Neptune	41.4° West
May 24, 2025	23:13	Mercury	0°08' south of	Uranus	6.32° West
June 08, 2025	20:10	Mercury	1°58' north of	Jupiter	11.56° East
July 04, 2025	12:42	Venus	2°21' south of	Uranus	42.96° West
August 12, 2025	05:26	Venus	0°52' south of	Jupiter	35.72° West
November 12, 2025	23:14	Mercury	1°15' south of	Mars	15.3° East
November 25, 2025	01:51	Mercury	0°59' north of	Venus	10.4° West

=== 2026 ===
Date	Time GMT	Planet	Angle distance	Planet	Elongation to Sun
January 08, 2026	02:44	Venus	0°10' north of	Mars	0.91° East
January 18, 2026	07:41	Mercury	0°58' south of	Mars	2.64° West
January 29, 2026	10:17	Mercury	0°41' south of	Venus	5.69° East
February 20, 2026	17:25	Saturn	0°50' south of	Neptune	28.72° East
March 07, 2026	11:28	Venus	0°04' north of	Neptune	14.44° East
March 08, 2026	13:38	Venus	0°55' north of	Saturn	14.75° East
April 13, 2026	05:31	Mars	0°19' north of	Neptune	20.68° West
April 17, 2026	02:02	Mercury	1°19' south of	Neptune	24.37° West
April 19, 2026	22:44	Mars	1°12' north of	Saturn	22.08° West
April 20, 2026	11:22	Mercury	0°27' south of	Saturn	22.59° West
April 24, 2026	01:55	Venus	0°45' north of	Uranus	25.98° East
May 18, 2026	00:09	Mercury	0°54' north of	Uranus	4.19° East
June 09, 2026	19:52	Venus	1°37' north of	Jupiter	36.81° East
July 04, 2026	06:06	Mars	0°06' south of	Uranus	38.44° West
August 15, 2026	11:18	Mercury	0°33' north of	Jupiter	12.54° West
November 16, 2026	06:00	Mars	1°12' north of	Jupiter	88.01° West

=== 2027 ===
Date	Time GMT	Planet	Angle distance	Planet	Elongation to Sun
April 11, 2027	17:55	Mercury	0°57' south of	Neptune	16.97° West
April 19, 2027	13:08	Mercury	0°34' north of	Saturn	10.29° West
April 24, 2027	10:57	Venus	0°14' south of	Neptune	28.88° West
May 07, 2027	18:56	Venus	0°36' north of	Saturn	25.68° West
May 11, 2027	12:47	Mercury	1°52' north of	Uranus	14.28° East
June 14, 2027	02:16	Venus	0°43' south of	Uranus	16.06° West
August 11, 2027	06:30	Mercury	0°31' north of	Venus	1.5° West
August 19, 2027	22:41	Mercury	0°37' north of	Jupiter	8.59° East
August 26, 2027	02:51	Venus	0°30' north of	Jupiter	4.06° East
November 25, 2027	01:34	Venus	0°19' south of	Mars	26.95° East

=== 2028 ===
Date	Time GMT	Planet	Angle distance	Planet	Elongation to Sun
February 11, 2028	12:16	Venus	1°12' north of	Neptune	42.5° East
February 29, 2028	02:56	Venus	3°26' north of	Saturn	44.8° East
March 28, 2028	00:40	Mars	0°38' north of	Neptune	1.85° West
April 04, 2028	00:59	Mercury	0°23' south of	Neptune	8.3° West
April 08, 2028	07:31	Mercury	0°38' south of	Mars	4.04° West
April 15, 2028	15:32	Mercury	2°05' north of	Saturn	4.42° East
April 30, 2028	23:05	Mars	1°47' north of	Saturn	8.98° West
May 07, 2028	14:24	Mercury	2°37' north of	Uranus	21.21° East
May 25, 2028	00:55	Mercury	2°32' south of	Venus	11.58° East
June 03, 2028	08:17	Venus	0°25' north of	Uranus	3.07° West
June 14, 2028	06:58	Venus	2°04' south of	Mars	19.15° West
June 23, 2028	20:40	Mars	0°12' north of	Uranus	21.48° West
October 22, 2028	13:32	Mercury	0°57' north of	Jupiter	17.14° West
November 10, 2028	00:54	Venus	0°37' north of	Jupiter	31.76° West

=== 2029 ===
Date	Time GMT	Planet	Angle distance	Planet	Elongation to Sun
March 27, 2029	14:54	Mercury	0°13' north of	Venus	1.54° East
March 27, 2029	18:55	Mercury	0°21' north of	Neptune	1.69° East
March 27, 2029	21:31	Venus	0°07' north of	Neptune	1.71° East
April 14, 2029	00:17	Mercury	4°04' north of	Saturn	17.65° East
April 24, 2029	22:48	Venus	1°34' north of	Saturn	8.38° East
May 19, 2029	10:13	Venus	0°26' north of	Uranus	14.65° East
June 23, 2029	23:03	Mercury	1°15' south of	Uranus	17.32° West
July 19, 2029	17:08	Mars	1°38' south of	Jupiter	82.03° East
September 07, 2029	14:50	Venus	1°44' south of	Jupiter	41.48° East
October 30, 2029	23:35	Mercury	0°34' south of	Jupiter	0.69° East
November 24, 2029	00:53	Venus	2°09' south of	Mars	43.2° East

=== 2030 ===
Date	Time GMT	Planet	Angle distance	Planet	Elongation to Sun
March 12, 2030	22:16	Mars	0°57' north of	Neptune	17.76° East
March 20, 2030	14:51	Mercury	1°20' north of	Neptune	10.41° East
May 12, 2030	23:22	Venus	0°18' south of	Neptune	39.99° West
May 16, 2030	14:37	Mars	2°02' north of	Saturn	2.57° East
June 08, 2030	19:49	Mercury	0°18' north of	Saturn	17.16° West
June 15, 2030	13:27	Mars	0°25' north of	Uranus	5.5° West
June 18, 2030	00:01	Mercury	0°05' north of	Uranus	7.68° West
June 19, 2030	01:23	Mercury	0°11' south of	Mars	6.44° West
June 25, 2030	00:12	Venus	0°19' north of	Saturn	30.6° West
July 09, 2030	13:14	Venus	1°03' south of	Uranus	27.02° West
August 05, 2030	19:01	Venus	0°43' south of	Mars	20.06° West
October 07, 2030	13:21	Mercury	0°05' north of	Venus	3.64° West
November 09, 2030	14:07	Mercury	2°35' south of	Jupiter	16.6° East
November 20, 2030	15:39	Venus	0°36' south of	Jupiter	7.86° East
