= Lyrids =

Meteor shower that occurs in April

Lyrids (LYR)
- Parent body: C/1861 G1 (Thatcher)

Radiant
- Constellation: Lyra and Hercules (near HD 166988)
- Right ascension: 18^{h} 10^{m}
- Declination: +33°

Properties
- Occurs during: April 15 – April 29
- Date of peak: April 23 (λ_{☉} = 32°)
- Velocity: 46.8 km/s
- Zenithal hourly rate: 18/hr

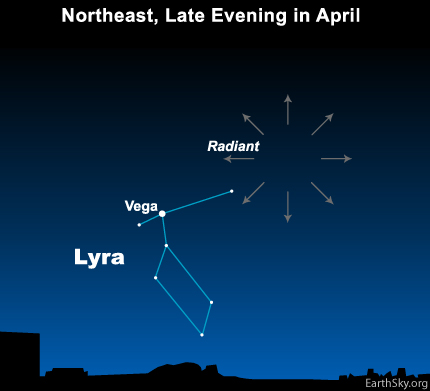
Radiant point of the April Lyrid meteor shower, active each year around April 22

The April Lyrids are a meteor shower lasting from about April 15 to April 29 each year. The radiant of the meteor shower is located near the constellations Lyra and Hercules, near the bright star Vega. The peak of the shower is typically around April 22–23 each year.

The source of the meteor shower are particles of dust shed by the comet C/1861 G1 (Thatcher). The April Lyrids are the strongest annual shower of meteors from debris of a long-period comet, mainly because as far as other intermediate long-period comets go (200–10,000 years), this one has a relatively short orbital period of about 415 years. The Lyrids have been observed and reported since 687 BC; no other modern shower has been recorded as far back in time.

The shower usually peaks around April 22 and the morning of April 23. Counts typically range from 5 to 20 meteors per hour, averaging around 10. As a result of light pollution, observers in rural areas will see more than observers in a city. Nights without the Moon in the sky will reveal the most meteors. April Lyrid meteors are usually around magnitude +2. However, some meteors can be brighter, known as "Lyrid fireballs", cast shadows for a split second and leave behind smokey debris trails that last minutes.

Lyrids shoot at about 47 km/s (169,200 km/h; 105,140 mph).

Occasionally, the shower intensifies when the planets steer the one-revolution dust trail of the comet into Earth's path, an event that happens about once every 60 years. This results in an April Lyrid meteor outburst. The one-revolution dust trail is dust that has completed one orbit: the stream of dust released in the return of the comet prior to the current 1861 return. This mechanism replaces earlier ideas that the outbursts were due to a cloud of dust moving in a 60-year orbit. In 1982, amateur astronomers counted 90 April Lyrids per hour at the peak and similar rates were seen in 1922. A stronger storm of up to 700 per hour occurred in 1803, and was observed by a journalist in Richmond, Virginia:

Shooting stars. This electrical phenomenon was observed on Wednesday morning last at Richmond and its vicinity, in a manner that alarmed many, and astonished every person that beheld it. From one until three in the morning, those starry meteors seemed to fall from every point in the heavens, in such numbers as to resemble a shower of sky rockets ...

Another such outburst, and the oldest known, the shower on March 23.7, 687 BC (proleptic Julian calendar) was recorded in Zuo Zhuan, which describes the shower as "On the 4th month in the summer in the year of xīn-mǎo (of year 7 of King Zhuang of Lu), at night, (the sky is so bright that some) fixed stars become invisible (because of the meteor shower); at midnight, stars fell like rain." In the Australian Aboriginal astronomy of the Boorong tribe, the Lyrids represent the scratchings of the Mallee fowl (represented by Vega), coinciding with its nest-building season.

Year	Peak of shower	ZHR_{max}
2007	April 23	21
2008	waning gibbous Moon (Full moon on April 20)	
2009	April 22	15
2010	April 22	20
2011	April 22	20
2012	April 22 and April 26 (spiked to 37 ± 21)	25/37
2013	April 22 (Full moon April 25)	22
2014	April 22 (last quarter moon rises at 2am local time)	20
2015	April 22	
2016	April 22 (Full Moon)	
2017	April 22–23	
