= Solar conjunction =

Solar system object is on the opposite side of the Sun from the Earth

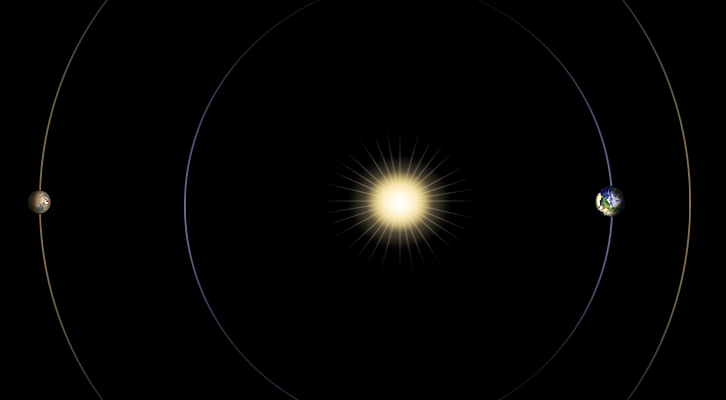
Solar conjunction between Earth and Mars

Solar conjunction generally occurs when a planet or other Solar System object is on the opposite side of the Sun from the Earth. From an Earth reference, the Sun will pass between the Earth and the object. Communication with any spacecraft in solar conjunction will be severely limited due to the Sun's interference on radio transmissions from the spacecraft.

The term can also refer to the passage of the line of sight to an interior planet (Mercury or Venus) or comet being very close to the solar disk. If the planet passes directly in front of the Sun, a solar transit occurs.

== Spacecraft-related issues ==
There is also a risk that an antenna equipped with auto-tracking will begin following the Sun's movements instead of the satellite once they are no longer inline with each other. This is because the Sun acts as a large electromagnetic noise generator which creates a signal much stronger than the satellite's tracking signal. One example of limitations caused by the solar conjunction occurred when the NASA-JPL team put the Curiosity rover on Mars' surface in autonomous operation mode for 25 days during the conjunction. In autonomous mode Curiosity suspends all movements and active science operations but retains communication-independent experiments (e.g. record atmospheric and radiation data). A more recent example occurred with the Mars rover Perseverance in October 2021.

== See also ==
- Conjunction (astronomy and astrology)
- List of conjunctions (astronomy)
- Opposition (astronomy)
