= C/1861 G1 (Thatcher) =

Long-period comet

Discovery
- Discovered by: A. E. Thatcher
- Discovery date: 5 April 1861

Designations
- Alternative designations: 1861 I

Orbital characteristics
- Epoch: 25 May 1861 (JD 2400920.5)
- Observation arc: 149 days
- Number of observations: 187
- Orbit type: Long period comet
- Aphelion: ~112 AU
- Perihelion: 0.921 AU (1861); 0.917 AU (2283)
- Semi-major axis: 56.3 AU
- Eccentricity: 0.983
- Orbital period: 422 years
- Inclination: 79.773°
- Longitude of ascending node: 31.867°
- Argument of periapsis: 213.45°
- Mean anomaly: –0.023°
- Last perihelion: 3 June 1861
- Next perihelion: 2283
- T_{Jupiter}: 0.304

Comet C/1861 G1 (Thatcher) is a long-period comet with roughly a 422-year orbit that is expected to return around 2283. It was discovered by A. E. Thatcher. It is responsible for the April Lyrid meteor shower. Carl Wilhelm Baeker also independently found this comet. The comet passed about 0.335 AU (50.1 million km; 31.1 million mi) from the Earth on 5 May 1861 and last came to perihelion (closest approach to the Sun) on 3 June 1861.

C/1861 G1 is listed as a long-period "non-periodic comet" because it has not yet been observed at two perihelion passages. When it is seen to come back around 2283, it should receive the P/ designation.

The comet is the parent body of the April Lyrids meteor shower.

== See also ==
- C/1861 J1 (Tebbutt) – Great Comet of 1861
- 153P/Ikeya–Zhang – periodic comet with a 366-year orbit
