= 2012 Venus–Jupiter–Mercury conjunction =

Astronomical event

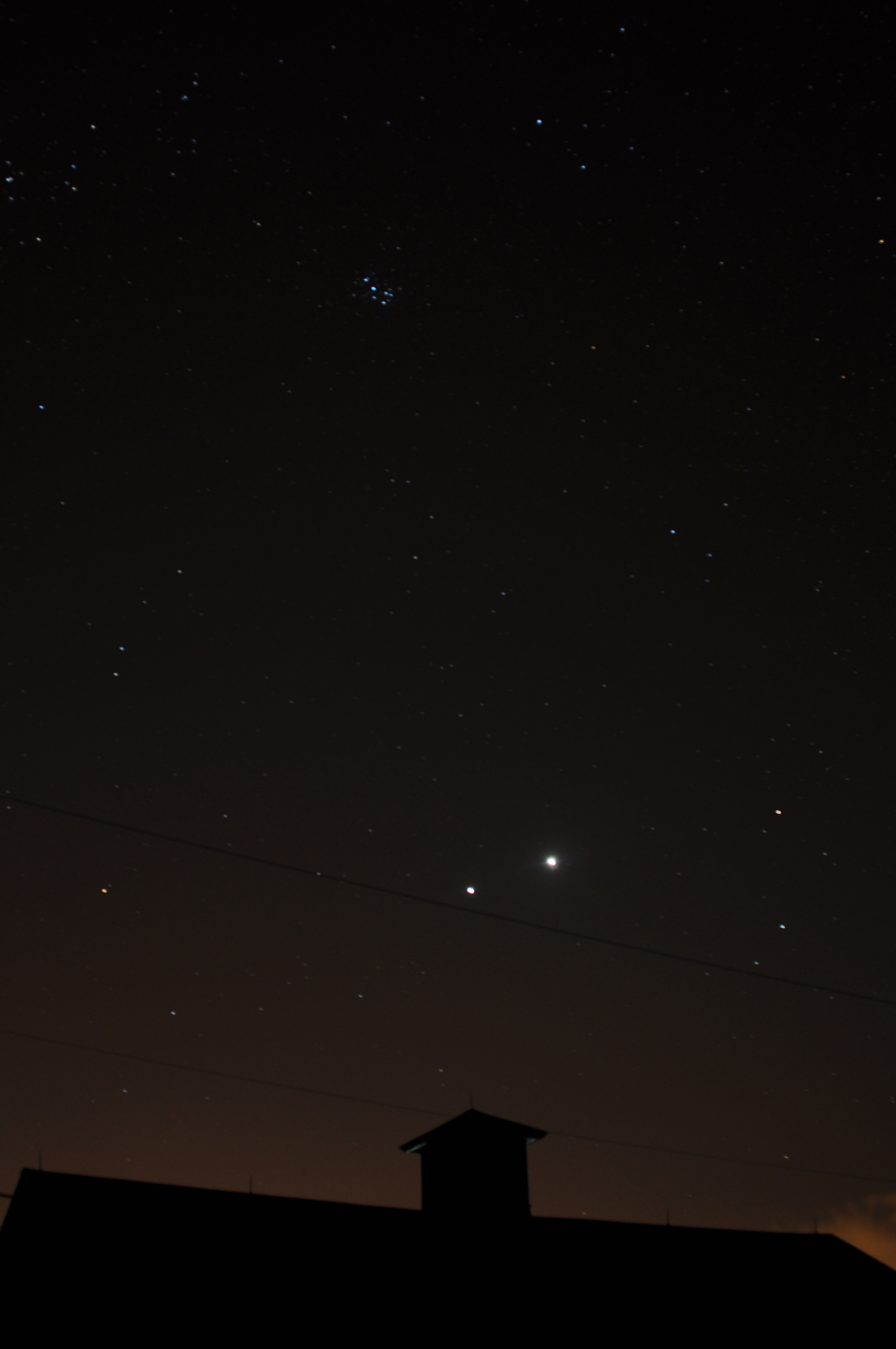
The March 13, 2012 conjunction of Jupiter and Venus (separated by a mere 3°), with the Pleiades at the top, as seen from southeastern New York State

The 2012 Venus–Jupiter–Mercury conjunction, was an astronomical conjunction that occurred on February 25, 2012 between the Mercury, Venus, and Jupiter, forming a triple conjunction. It was globally observed in the western sky soon after sunset.

On March 13, Venus and Jupiter re-entered conjunction, and five astrological signs (zodiac constellations) were globally visible, all around sunset local time.

As the Venus and Jupiter conjunction continued to converge through March 2012, three other planets became visible. Mercury, Mars, and Saturn. Mercury was visible just above the western horizon soon after sunset. Mars was visible in the eastern sky, from the Northern Hemisphere.

== Venus–Jupiter conjunction ==
On March 15, 2012, Venus and Jupiter drew to within 3 degrees of each other.

A similar conjunction happened in May 2013, but with less visibility.

== See also ==
- Conjunction (astronomy)
- Triple conjunction
