= Amino radical =

Chemical group (NH2)

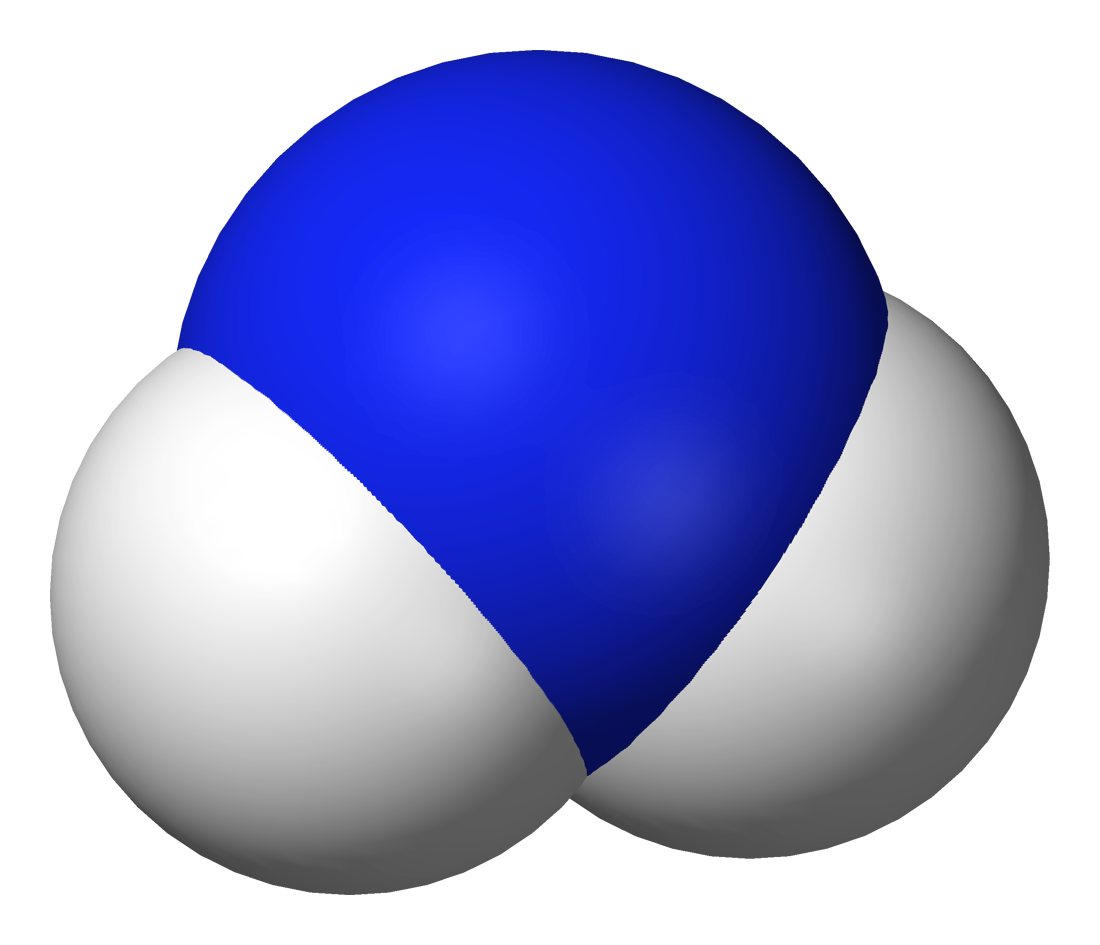

Names
- IUPAC name Azanyl; Aminyl
- Systematic IUPAC name Azanyl (substitutive); Dihydridonitrogen(•) (additive)
- Other names Amidogen; Amino radical

Identifiers
CAS Number	13770-40-6
3D model (JSmol)	Interactive image
ChEBI	CHEBI:29318
ChemSpider	109932
PubChem CID	123329
CompTox Dashboard (EPA)	DTXSID801029786
- InChI: InChI=1S/H2N/h1H2 Key: MDFFNEOEWAXZRQ-UHFFFAOYSA-N
- SMILES: [NH2]

Properties
Chemical formula	NH_{2}^{•}
Molar mass	16.0226 g mol^{−1}

Thermochemistry
Std molar entropy (S^{⦵}_{298})	194.71 J K^{−1} mol^{−1}
Std enthalpy of formation (Δ_{f}H^{⦵}_{298})	190.37 kJ mol^{−1}
- Except where otherwise noted, data are given for materials in their standard state (at 25 °C [77 °F], 100 kPa). verify (what is ?) Infobox references

In chemistry, the amino radical, ·NH_{2}, also known as the aminyl or azanyl, is the neutral form of the amide ion (NH^{−}_{2}). Aminyl radicals are highly reactive and consequently short-lived, like most radicals; however, they form an important part of nitrogen chemistry. In sufficiently high concentration, amino radicals dimerise to form hydrazine. While −NH_{2} as a functional group is common in nature, forming a part of many compounds (e.g. the phenethylamines), the radical cannot be isolated in its free form.

== Synthesis ==
Amino radicals can be produced in controlled fashion via radiochemistry or single-electron redox.

Irradiation aqueous ammonia solution generates the hydroxyl radical, which then abstracts a hydrogen atom from ammonia:

NH_{3} + HO^{•} → ·NH_{2} + H_{2}O

The rate constant (k_{1}) for this reaction is about (9 + 1)×10^{7} M^{−1} s^{−1}. The reaction is suppressed in acidic solutions, as NH^{+}_{4} undergoes the corresponding reaction undetectably slowly.

Aqueous electrons reduce hydroxylamine (NH_{2}OH) to hydroxide and amino radicals. In the simplest case, such electrons are produced from titanium(III) salt solutions:

Ti^{III} + NH_{2}OH → Ti^{IV} + ·NH_{2} + OH^{−}

Unlike the radiative reaction, a parallel reaction is expected to occur at pH 3–7. One presumed intermediate is the ammoniumyl (NH^{+}_{3}):

·NH^{+}_{3} ↔ ·NH_{2} + H^{+}

== Properties ==
=== Electronic states ===
The amino radical has two characteristic electronic states:

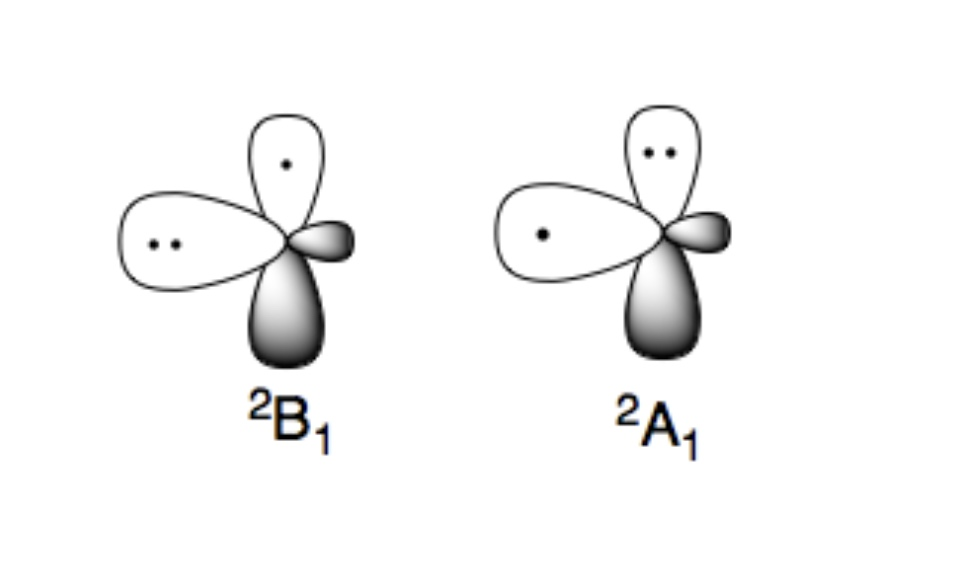

The more stable electronic state is ^{2}B_{1}, where the unpaired electron is in the p-orbital perpendicular to the plane of the molecule (π type radical). The high energy electronic state, ^{2}A_{1}, has the two electrons in the p-orbital and the unpaired electron in the sp^{2} orbital (σ type radical).

Nitrogen centered compounds, such as amines, are nucleophilic in nature. This character is also seen in amino radicals, which can be considered to be nucleophilic species.

=== Spectral properties ===
The amino radical only exhibits a very low optical absorption in the visible region (λ_{max} = 530 nm, ε_{max} = 81 M^{−1} s^{−1}), while its absorption in the UV (<260 nm) is similar to that of OH. Due to this, it is impractical to determine the rate of reaction of the amino radical with organic compounds by following the decay of the amino radical.

== Reactivity ==
In general, amino radicals are highly reactive and short lived; however, this is not the case when reacted with some organic molecules. Relative reactivities of the amino radical with several organic compounds have been reported, but the absolute rate constants for such reactions remain unknown. In reaction 1, it was hypothesized that the amino radical might possibly react with NH_{3} more rapidly than OH and might oxidize NH^{+}_{4} to produce the amino radical in acid solutions, given that radicals are stronger oxidants than OH. In order to test this, sulfate and phosphate radical anions were used. The sulfate and phosphate radical anions were found to react more slowly with NH_{3} than does the amino radical and they react with ammonia by hydrogen abstraction and not by electron transfer oxidation.

When the amino radical is reacted with benzoate ions, the rate constant is very low and only a weak absorption in the UV spectra is observed, indicating that amino radicals do not react with benzene rapidly. Phenol, on the other hand, was found to react more rapidly with the amino radical. In experiments at pH 11.3 and 12, using 1.5 M MNH_{3} and varying concentrations of phenol between 4 and 10 mM, the formation of the phenoxyl radical absorption was observed with a rate constant of (3 + 0.4)×10^{6} M^{−1} s^{−1}. This reaction can produce phenoxyl radicals via two possible mechanisms:

1. Addition to the ring followed by elimination of NH_{3}, or
2. Oxidation by direct electron transfer

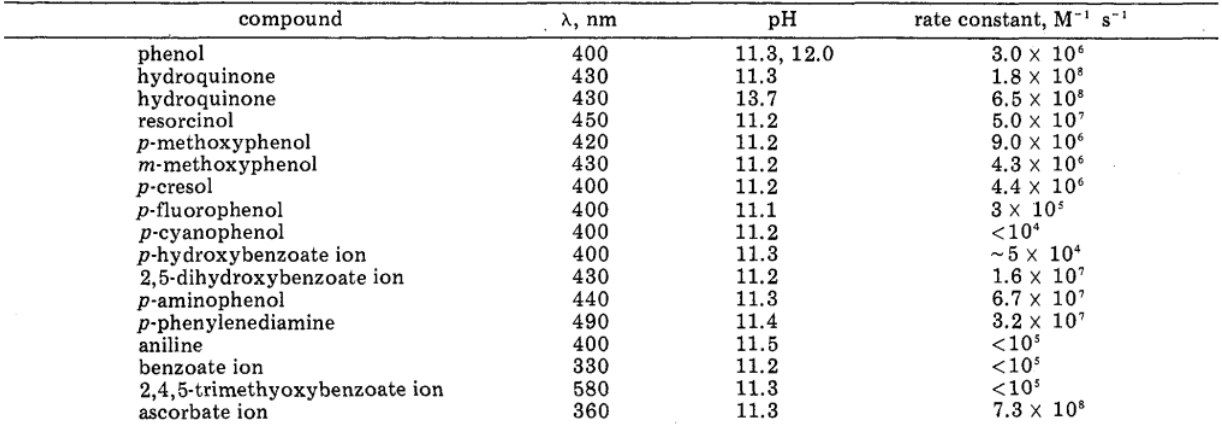
Rate constants for reaction of NH_{2}^{•} radicals. These rate constants for the amino radical reactions were measured in a 1978 study by Neta et al. by following the kinetics of formation of the resultant radicals. The observations were made at the absorption maxima of these radicals.

While the amino radical is known to be weakly reactive, the recombination process of two amino radicals to form hydrazine appears to be one of the fastest. As a result, it often competes with other NH_{2}^{•} reactions.

NH_{2}^{•} + NH_{2}^{•} → N_{2}H_{4}

At low pressures, this reaction is the fastest and therefore the principal mode of NH_{2}^{•} disappearance.

== See also ==
- Amide
- Amine
- Radical (chemistry)
- Hydrazine – dimer of amino radicals
