= Ursid =

Ursid may refer to:

- Ursidae, the taxonomy family of bears
- Ursids, a meteor shower
