= Comet Giacobini =

Comet Giacobini, or Giacobini's Comet, may refer to any of the 10 comets discovered by French astronomer, Michel Giacobini, below:

- 205P/Giacobini
- C/1898 M1 (Giacobini)
- C/1899 S1 (Giacobini)
- C/1900 B1 (Giacobini)
- C/1902 X1 (Giacobini)
- C/1903 A1 (Giacobini)
- C/1904 Y1 (Giacobini)
- C/1905 F1 (Giacobini)
- C/1905 X1 (Giacobini)
- C/1907 E1 (Giacobini)

It may also be a partial reference to several comets he co-discovered with other astronomers:

- 21P/Giacobini–Zinner
- 41P/Tuttle–Giacobini–Kresak
