= October 1946 =

Month of 1946

<<	October 1946					>>
Su	Mo	Tu	We	Th	Fr	Sa
		1	2	3	4	5
6	7	8	9	10	11	12
13	14	15	16	17	18	19
20	21	22	23	24	25	26
27	28	29	30	31

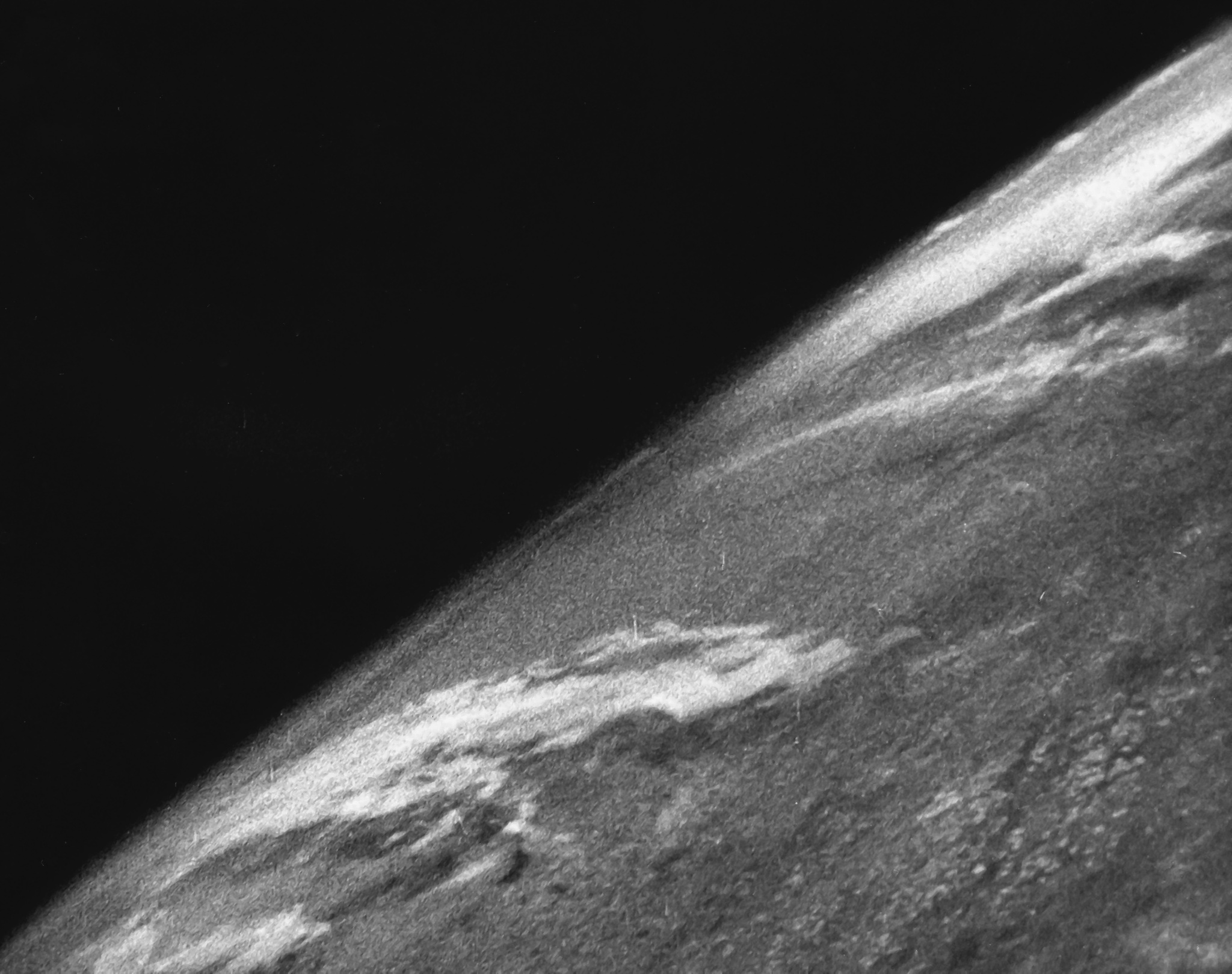
October 24, 1946: V-2 rocket takes first picture of Earth from outer space

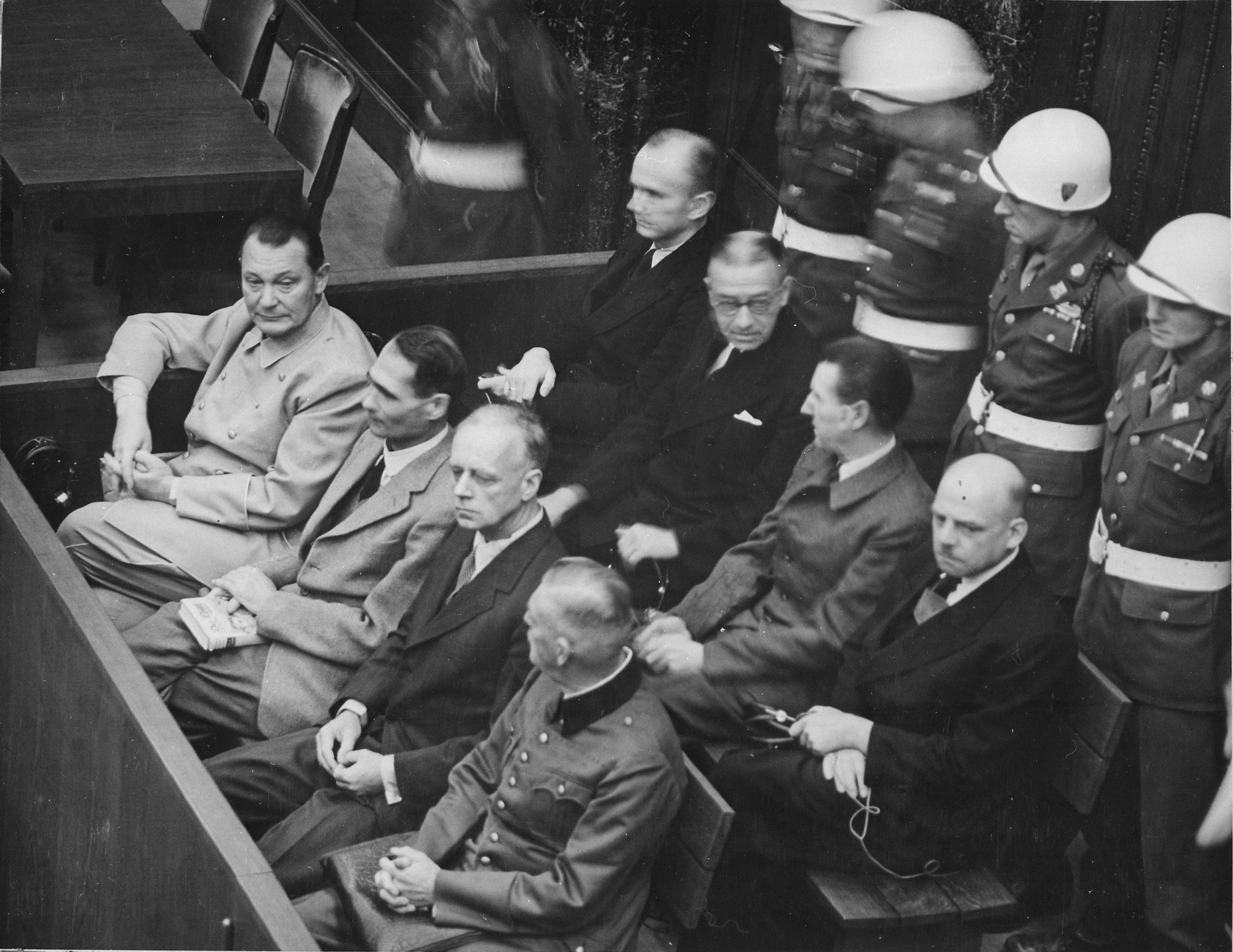
October 1, 1946: Twelve convicted Nazi war criminals sentenced to be hanged October 16

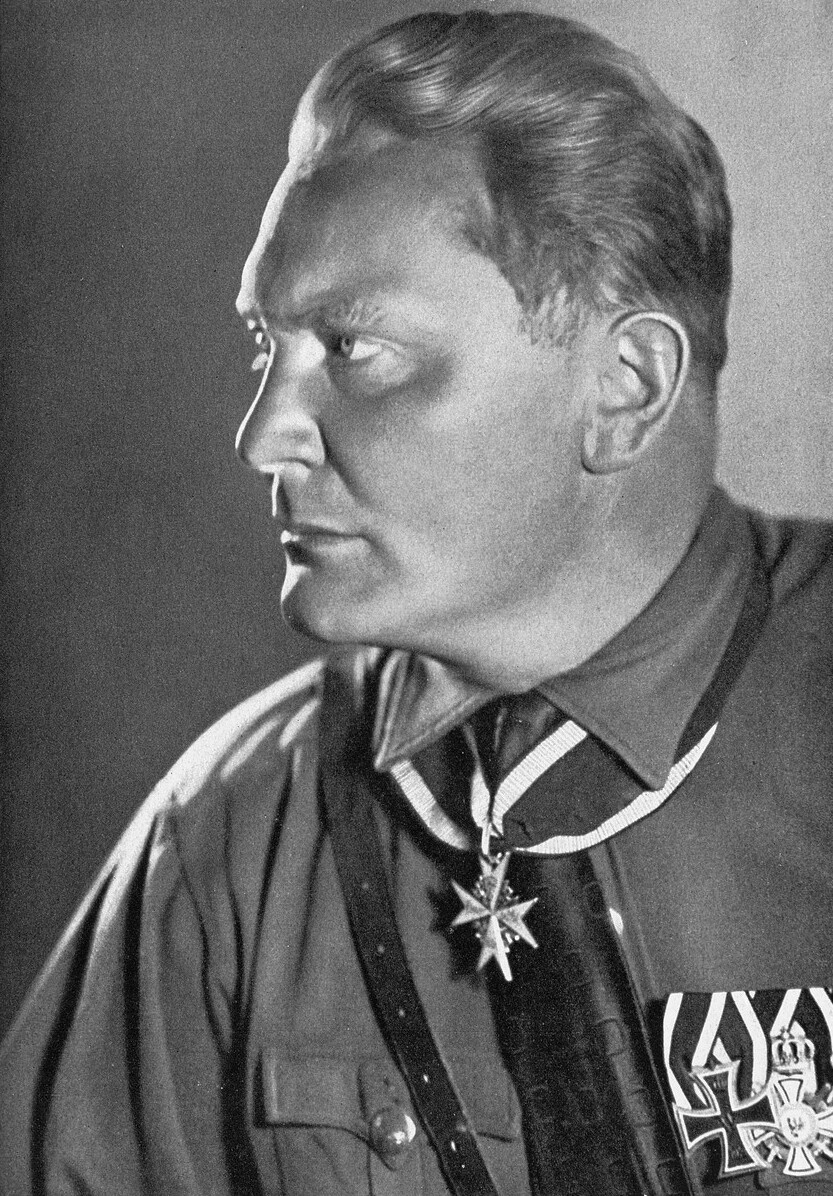
October 15, 1946: Nazi war criminal Hermann Göring poisons himself, avoids execution

The following events occurred in October 1946:

== October 1, 1946 (Tuesday) ==
- The day after the verdicts were rendered in the Nuremberg Trials, sentences were pronounced. Twelve of Nazi Germany's most murderous leaders were given two weeks more to live, with hangings scheduled for October 15.
- Mensa, the high IQ society, was founded in Oxford, the United Kingdom, by Roland Berrill and Lancelot Ware. According to the website for the American organization, "the date is now the recognized founding date for the organization", based on Berrill when the first piece of Mensa literature was printed.
- Kim Il Sung University was founded near Pyongyang.
- Communist China's first motion picture company, the Northeast Film Studio (renamed in 1955 as the Changchun Film Studio and in 2000 as the Changchun Film Group Corporation) was established at Xingshan.
- The Alaskan Air Command, formerly the Eleventh U.S. Air Force was permanently headquartered at Elmendorf Air Force Base.

== October 2, 1946 (Wednesday) ==
- Faraway Hill, the first soap opera ever shown on a TV network, debuted at 9:00 pm on the DuMont Television Network (limited to New York and Washington), and ran for 12 weeks.
- Born:
  - Ron Griffiths, Welsh singer for Badfinger; in Swansea
  - Ping Chong, Canadian-born American playwright; in Toronto

== October 3, 1946 (Thursday) ==
- In the worst civilian airplane crash up to that time, all 39 people on board a Douglas DC-4 airliner were killed when the plane crashed into a hillside in Canada. The American Overseas Airlines flight from New York City to Berlin, with stops in between, took off from Stephenville, Newfoundland and Labrador at 3:23 p.m., and crashed ten minutes later.
- The St. Louis Cardinals beat the Brooklyn Dodgers 8–4 to win the second game of a best-of-3 series in the first National League playoffs ever played, and advanced to the 1946 World Series to face the Boston Red Sox. Both teams had finished with 96-58 records at the end of the regular season.

== October 4, 1946 (Friday) ==
- On the eve of the Jewish Yom Kippur holiday, and a month before midterm elections, U.S. President Harry S. Truman announced that he had cabled British Prime Minister Clement Attlee to say that he endorsed immediate immigration of over 100,000 Jewish refugees into Palestine. Truman's rationale was that the British-mediated conference between Arabs and Jews had been adjourned until December, and that "In view of the fact that winter will come before the conference can be resumed, I believe and urge that substantial immigration into Palestine cannot await a solution." Attlee was furious at Truman's sudden public statement, and forecast that it would only increase violence in the region, while leaders of Arab nations felt that they had been betrayed, and Truman's opponents criticized the decision as a clumsy bid for Jewish voters. "It may well have been Truman's desperate political straits that led him to such a blatantly political gambit," observed one later historian.
- The Nag Hammadi library was saved for posterity, as the Coptic Museum in Cairo accepted the ancient scrolls into its permanent collection. Twelve complete manuscripts and eight pages of a 13th had been buried in a sealed jar in the 4th century AD and not unearthed again until December 1945. The text "begins at the approximate time that the Dead Sea Scrolls leave off", notes one author.
- Born:
  - Susan Sarandon, American film actress; as Susan Tomalin in New York City
  - Chuck Hagel, U.S. Senator for Nebraska 1997-2009, U.S. Secretary of Defense 2013 to 2015; in North Platte, Nebraska
- Died:
  - Barney Oldfield, 68, American race car driver
  - Gifford Pinchot, 81, American conservationist and the first Chief of the U.S. Forest Service

== October 5, 1946 (Saturday) ==
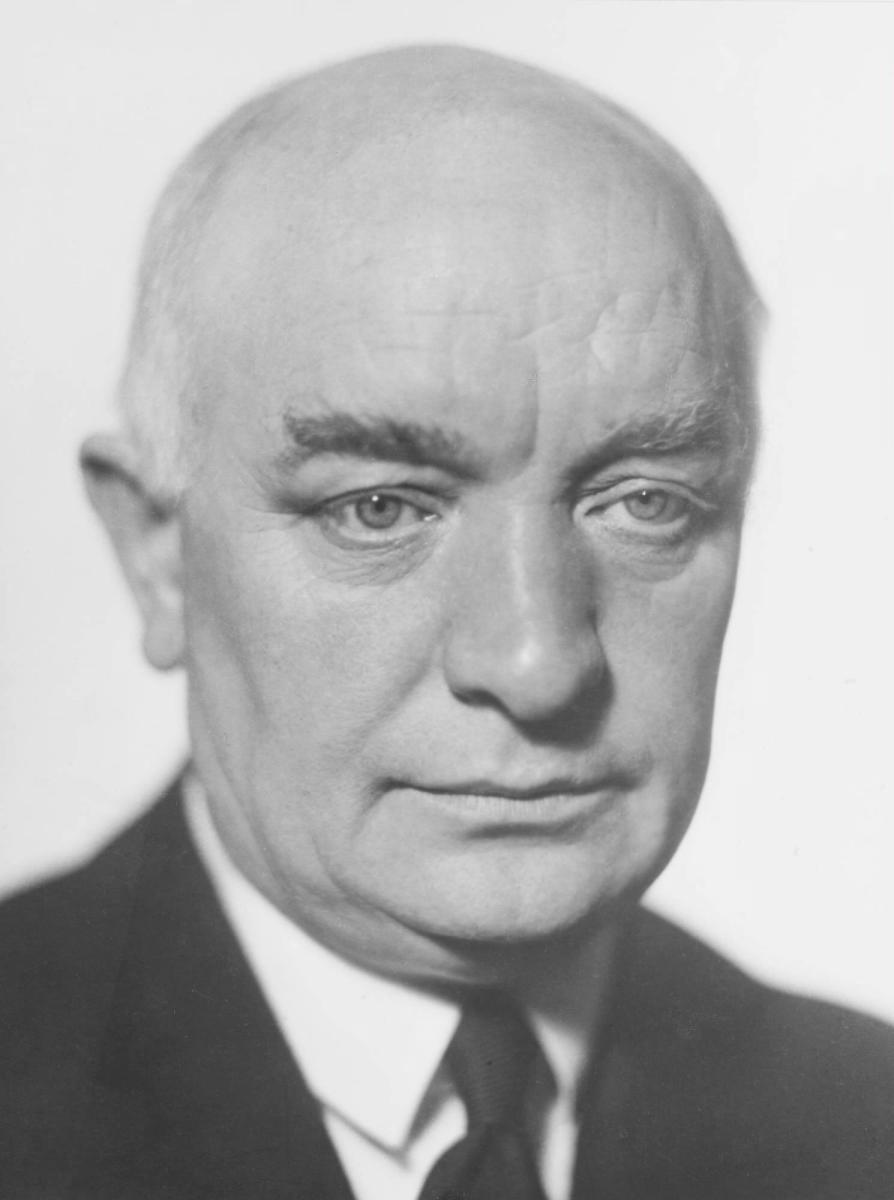
Hansson

- Sweden's Prime Minister since 1932, Per Albin Hansson, died from a cerebral hemorrhage as he was walking home after a meeting of his cabinet in Stockholm, where Sweden's trade agreement with the Soviet Union was approved.
- Republican Senator Robert A. Taft called the Nuremberg Trials "an outrage against justice", controversially arguing that they were carried out under ex post facto laws and that the making of war "should not be made a personal crime."

== October 6, 1946 (Sunday) ==
- The "11 points in the Negev" program saw the simultaneous construction of 11 Jewish settlements in separate parts of British Palestine, going up overnight in the Negev Desert.
- Died: István Bethlen, 71, Prime Minister of Hungary from 1921 to 1931, died in a Soviet prison

== October 7, 1946 (Monday) ==
- A Fairey Firefly airplane struck a school in Apeldoorn, in the Netherlands, killing 23 people, most of whome were teenage schoolboys. The 21-year-old pilot, on his first solo flight, was flying low over his parents' house in a misguided stunt, and the left wing clipped the roof of the school gymnasium, dropping burning fuel inside. The dead included the pilot and his mother, who suffered a fatal heart attack.
- By a vote of 342 to 5, the Constitution of Japan, as revised by the House of Councillors, was approved by the House of Representatives of Japan. The instrument, which provided equal rights and renounced war, went into effect on May 3, 1947, six months after it was promulgated.
- Born: Catharine MacKinnon, American feminist activist; in Minneapolis

== October 8, 1946 (Tuesday) ==
- Voters in the U.S. territory of Alaska participated in the first referendum on the question of statehood. At the time, the total population was less than 85,000 people, and it took two months to tally all of the ballots. The final result of the advisory resolution was 9,630 to 6,822 in favor of Alaska someday becoming the 49th state of the United States, a goal which would finally be attained on January 3, 1959.
- Born:
  - Dennis Kucinich, American politician who became the "Boy Mayor of Cleveland" at age 31 (1977-1979), later U.S. Representative for Ohio 1997 to 2013; in Cleveland
  - Hanan Ashrawi, Palestinian activist; in Nablus, Mandatory Palestine

== October 9, 1946 (Wednesday) ==
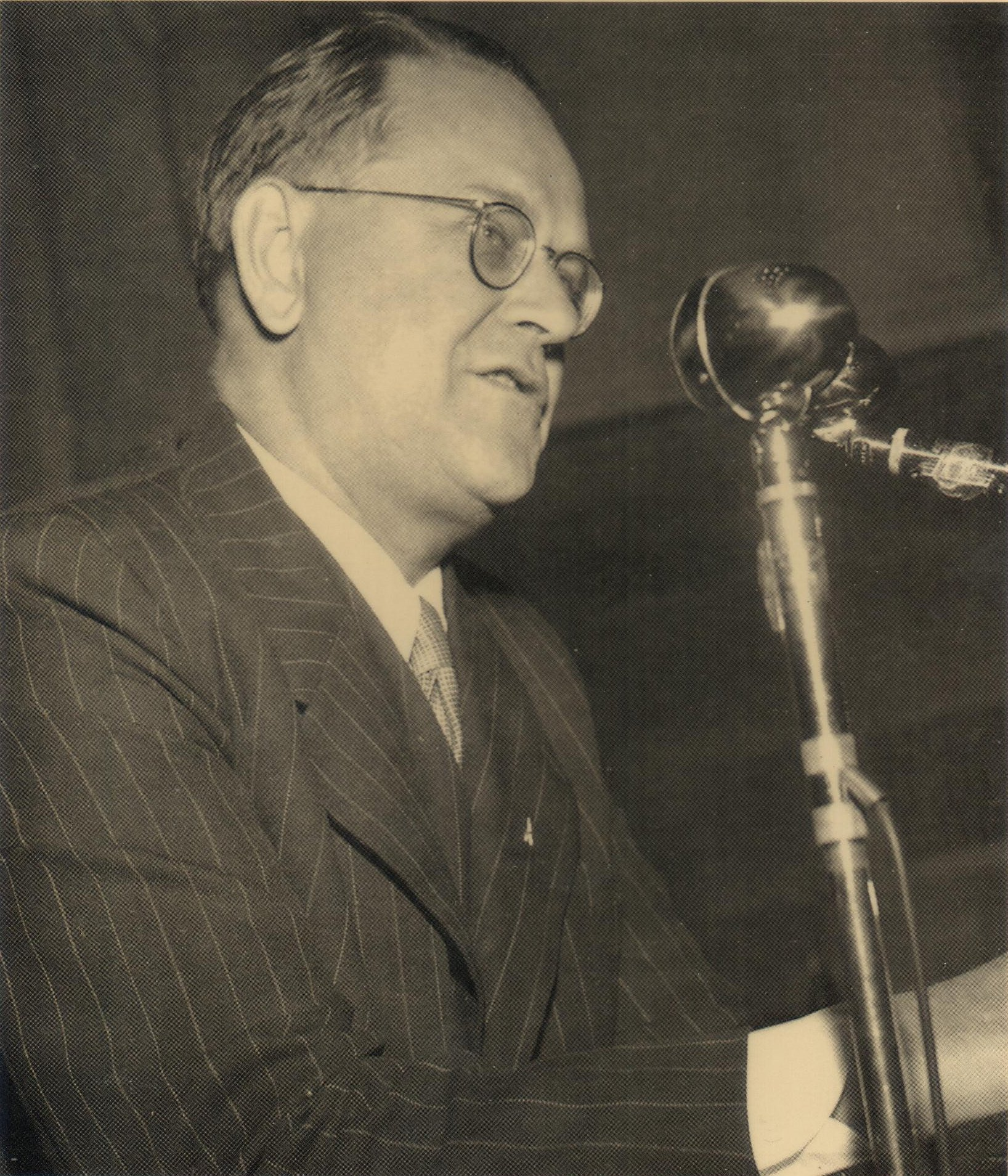
Erlander

- Tage Erlander began a 23-year service as Prime Minister of Sweden, which would last until 1969. The Education Minister was elected as the new leader of Sweden's ruling Social Democratic party, succeeding the late Prime Minister Per Albin Hansson.
- One of the most spectacular meteor showers visible from Earth was seen after the planet passed through the debris left by Comet Giacobini-Zinner. A greater number of meteors (referred to as Giacobinids or Draconids) burned up in the atmosphere than usual because of a closer approach. The comet and the Earth came within 131,000 miles of each other.
- Eugene O'Neill's last play, The Iceman Cometh, premiered on Broadway.
- George Adamski saw a UFO for the first time, hovering near Mount Palomar toward San Diego, and began a career in ufology. He claimed trips in UFOs beginning in 1952.
- The brochure Communist Infiltration of the United States was released by U.S. Chamber of Commerce. Eventually, 400,000 copies were distributed.
- A mass stranding of false killer whales occurs in Mar del Plata, Argentina with about 850 dolphins stranding themselves.
- Born:
  - Naoto Kan, Prime Minister of Japan from 2010 to 2011; in Ube, Yamaguchi Prefecture
  - Chris Tarrant, English game show host for the British show Who Wants to Be a Millionaire?; in Reading, Berkshire

== October 10, 1946 (Thursday) ==
- A V-2 rocket launched by the United States from the White Sands Missile Range in New Mexico reached an altitude of 100 miles and sent back unprecedented information about the Sun, providing the first photograph of the solar ultraviolet spectrum.
- Tsinghua University reopened in China with an enrollment of 3,000 students, more than nine years after the Army of Japan had looted the campus.
- The Missouri city of Centerville, located in Phelps County, was renamed Doolittle in honor of aviation pioneer and Medal of Honor winner Jimmy Doolittle.
- The musical biography film The Jolson Story starring Larry Parks as Al Jolson was released.
- Born:
  - Ben Vereen, African-American actor; as Benjamin Middleton in Miami
  - Gene Tenace, American MLB catcher; in Russellton, Pennsylvania

== October 11, 1946 (Friday) ==
- Major General Lewis B. Hershey, director of the Selective Service, announced the end of the draft. Persons scheduled to report to their local draft board on or after October 16 had their inductions cancelled. The Selective Service Act expired on March 31, 1947, with no further inductions. A new draft act was signed into law on June 24, 1948.
- Tage Erlander became Prime Minister of Sweden.
- Born: Daryl Hall, American pop singer (Hall & Oates); as Daryl Hohl in Pottstown, PA

== October 12, 1946 (Saturday) ==
- Article 3 of the Allied Control Council Directive 38 was put into effect in the Soviet Zone of Germany, and remained in effect when the zone became the German Democratic Republic. With vague language making it a criminal offense for anyone to have, after May 8, 1945, "endangered or possibly endangered the peace of the German people or the peace of the world through propaganda for National Socialism or militarism or by the invention or diffusion of tendentious rumors", the law was applied to fire 520,000 former Nazi party members from jobs, and to convict more than 11,000 people between 1948 and 1964.
- Born: Jack Fuller, American journalist and publisher; in Chicago (d. 2016)
- Died: General Joseph Stilwell, 63, American military leader who commanded U.S. Army operations in China and Burma during World War II

== October 13, 1946 (Sunday) ==
- By a vote of 9,297,351 oui to 8,165,744 non, voters approved a new constitution for France, creating that nation's "Fourth Republic", which provided for a weak, and indirectly elected president. The upper house of parliament, the French Senate, was replaced by a weaker "Council of the Republic"; promulgated on October 27, the new constitution would last less than 12 years, until the establishment of the "Fifth Republic" in 1958.
- The Muslim League agreed to join the Interim Government of India, accepting five of the 12 seats on the Executive Council, reversing an earlier decision not to participate. Participation lasted less than a year, with the League creating the nation of Pakistan from the Muslim sections of British India. Jawaharlal Nehru, future Prime Minister of India, continued as the Minister for External Affairs and Commonwealth Relations, while the future Prime Minister of Pakistan, Liaqat Ali Khan, became the interim government's new Finance Minister.
- Born:
  - Demond Wilson, American TV actor famous as Lamont Sanford on Sanford and Son; in Valdosta, Georgia (d. 2026)
  - Lacy J. Dalton (stage name for Jill Lynne Byrem), American country music singer; in Bloomsburg, Pennsylvania

== October 14, 1946 (Monday) ==
- With Americans facing a shortage of meat, President Truman reluctantly ended all price controls. In a nationwide radio address at 9:00 pm Eastern Time, Truman described the situation and then told his listeners, "There is only one remedy left— that is to lift controls on meat. Accordingly, the secretary of agriculture and the price administrator are removing all price controls on livestock, and food and feed products therefrom— tomorrow." With no ceiling imposed by the Office of Price Administration, meat prices doubled and production increased.
- A truce between Dutch and Indonesian armies was signed at 6:00 pm at the residence of Sir Philip Christison with the Republic of Indonesia and the remaining colonies of the Dutch East Indies co-existing separately. The agreement broke down within a few months, and on July 20, 1947, the Netherlands attacked the republic. Full independence was not achieved until December 27, 1949.
- The International Organization for Standardization (ISO) founded with the opening of a multinational conference in London. "ISO" is not an abbreviation for the organization's name in any language, and was based on the Greek word isos, meaning equal.
- B.R. Ambedkar, architect of the Indian Constitution, converted to Buddhism at a formal ceremony in Nagpur along with 500,000 other Dalits – formerly untouchables.
- Born:
  - François Bozizé, President of the Central African Republic 2003 to 2013; in Mouila, French Equatorial Africa (now in the Republic of Gabon)
  - Dan McCafferty, Scottish rock musician, lead singer of the rock band Nazareth; in Dunfermline, Fife (d. 2022)
  - Joey de Leon, Filipino comedian, actor and television presenter; in Binondo, Manila
  - Justin Hayward, English musician for The Moody Blues; in Swindon, Wiltshire
  - Craig Venter, American biologist and geneticist, in Salt Lake City (d.2026)

== October 15, 1946 (Tuesday) ==
- Hours before he was scheduled to be the first Nazi war criminal to hang following his conviction in the Nuremberg Trials, Gestapo founder Hermann Göring avoided the hangman's noose by poisoning himself. During his imprisonment, Goering had concealed, on his person, a glass vial of cyanide inside a .25 caliber brass cartridge. Suspicion originally fell upon Goering's lawyer, his wife and his barber as people who might have provided him with his means of suicide, but an investigation by the Allied powers concluded that Göring had kept the cartridge hidden even before his arrest.
- The St. Louis Cardinals beat the Boston Red Sox 4–3 in the seventh game of the best-of-seven World Series to win the championship of major league baseball.
- Born: Richard Carpenter, American pop singer for the brother-sister duo The Carpenters; in New Haven, Connecticut

== October 16, 1946 (Wednesday) ==
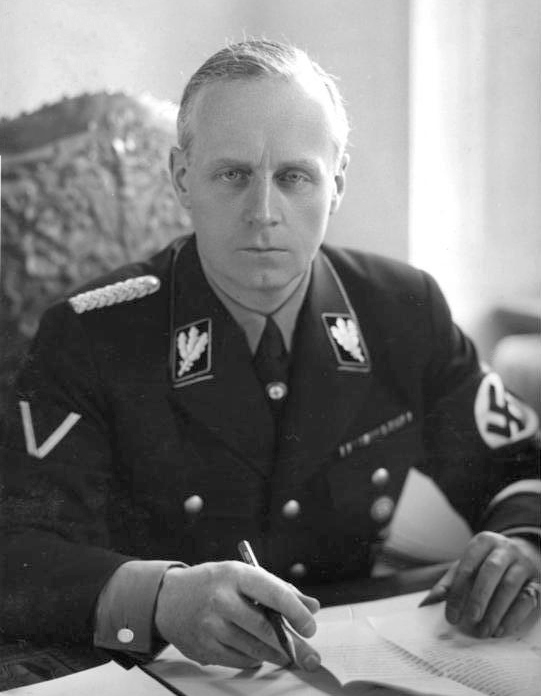
Former German Foreign Minister Ribbentrop first to be hanged

- One by one, the ten remaining Nazi war criminals on death row after the Nuremberg Trials were hanged in a gymnasium on the premises of the Nuremberg Palace of Justice. Taking the place of Hermann Göring as first in line was Joachim von Ribbentrop, 53, the German Foreign Minister, who dropped from the gallows at 1:16 a.m., with Master Sergeant John C. Woods handling the duties as the U.S. Army's hangman. Ribbentrop was followed by Field Marshal Wilhelm Keitel, 64; Ernst Kaltenbrunner, 43, Commander of the German SS national police; Alfred Rosenberg, 53, Minister of Eastern Occupied Territories, 1941–45; Hans Frank, 46, Governor General of Poland, 1939–45; Wilhelm Frick, 69, Interior Minister 1933–43, "Protector of Bohemia and Moravia" 1943–45; Julius Streicher, 61, propaganda publisher; Fritz Sauckel, 51, administrator of "labor deployment" for 5,000,000 workers imported from occupied territories; and General Alfred Jodl, 56, Supreme Commander of Nazi armed forces. The last was Arthur Seyss-Inquart, 54, Reichskommissar of the Netherlands 1940–44, who was dropped at 2:45
- The RMS Queen Elizabeth made her first voyage as a luxury ocean liner, after having been used to carry British troops during World War II. Ironically, Sir Percy Bates, who had been chairman of the Cunard Line when the ship was first commissioned, died on the same day of its commercial debut.
- Gordie Howe made his National Hockey League debut, scoring a goal for the Detroit Red Wings in his first game, a 3–3 tie with Toronto. Howe played in the NHL in five decades (40s, 50s, 60s, 70s and 80s), appearing in 1,767 NHL and 419 WHA games. His final goal was scored on April 9, 1980, in his penultimate game, for the Hartford Whalers in an 8-4 playoff loss to Montreal.
- Born: Suzanne Somers, American TV actress known for portraying Chrissy Snow on Three's Company; as Suzanne Mahoney in San Bruno, California (d. 2023)

== October 17, 1946 (Thursday) ==
- A Russian language translation of Strategic Position of the British Empire, a top secret document stolen from the War Office, was delivered to Soviet Premier Joseph Stalin. The extent of betrayal of Britain's security was not revealed until 1999, after the end of the Cold War.
- The OPA removed all price controls on coffee, effective immediately.
- Born: Bob Seagren, American pole vaulter; in Pomona, California. Seagren broke the world record four times between 1966 and 1972.

== October 18, 1946 (Friday) ==
- The Congress of Bamako opened as 800 delegates from around French West Africa assembled to establish a unified movement for creating nations independent of colonial France. Rassemblement Démocratique Africain was founded at the conference as the first political party whose mission was independence. Félix Houphouët-Boigny, who would later become the President of Côte d'Ivoire, was elected the RDA's leader.
- USS Ranger, the first American ship designed to serve as an aircraft carrier, was decommissioned. The ship, which had proved to be imperfect for takeoffs and landings of planes, was sold as scrap three months later.
- Born: Howard Shore, Canadian film score composer known for The Lord of the Rings film trilogy; in Toronto

== October 19, 1946 (Saturday) ==
- The dismantling of the Strategic Services Unit (SSU), an American intelligence agency created a year earlier after the dissolution of the Office of Strategic Services, was completed.

== October 20, 1946 (Sunday) ==
- Partido Independista Puertoriqueño, the Puerto Rican Independence Party, was founded in San Juan with Dr. Gilberto Concepción de Gracia as its first president, setting as its mission "to labor for the immediate recognition of the full sovereignty of the people of Puerto Rico" in order to create "a free, independent and democratic Republic" separate from the United States.
- Born:
  - Elfriede Jelinek, Austrian playwright, winner of 2004 Nobel Prize in Literature; in Mürzzuschlag
  - Ivan Rybkin, Russian politician who served as Chairman of the State Duma of Russia from 1994 to 1995; in Semigorovka, Russian SFSR, Soviet Union

== October 21, 1946 (Monday) ==
- Nationalist Chinese President Chiang Kai-shek made his first visit to the island of Taiwan. After flying over from Nanjing, Chiang was greeted at Taipei by the province's Governor, Chen Yi. After the Chinese Communist Party took control of the mainland in 1949, Chiang fled to Taiwan and ruled it as the Republic of China until his death in 1975.
- The second major land reform law in Japan was passed after being drafted by the American occupying authority. After the "Law for the Special Establishment of Independent Cultivators" took effect, the percentage of Japanese farmland farmed by sharecroppers renting from landlords, would drop from 46% to 10%.
- Born: Lux Interior, American rock musician (The Cramps), in Akron, Ohio (d. 2009)

== October 22, 1946 (Tuesday) ==
- The Soviet Army carried out the simultaneous roundup of all persons in Soviet occupied Germany who were deemed essential to the Soviet missile program, then shipped them and their families by train to the USSR. Rocket scientists at Mittelwerk had been attending a late night party held in their honor by General Gaidukov, and then were told that they would be moving. This is called Operation Osoaviakhim
- In what came to be known as part of the Corfu Channel Incident, a convoy of Royal Navy ships was sailing through the Straits of Corfu as part of a British test of Albania's defenses, which had fired on two cruisers in May. The destroyer HMS Saumarez struck a mine at 2:53 pm, and HMS Volage collided with a second mine at 4:31 pm while towing Saumarez. In all, 44 men were killed and 42 seriously injured in the explosions.

== October 23, 1946 (Wednesday) ==
- The first United Nations General Assembly, with 51 members, convened in New York City for the first time, continuing a session that had been adjourned in London in February. U.S. President Harry Truman opened the Assembly at its temporary home in Flushing Meadows – Corona Park.
- Died: Kurt Daluege, 49, the Nazi SS Officer who had ordered the June 9, 1942, massacre of all residents of the village of Lidice, was hanged at the Pankrác Prison in Czechoslovakia.

== October 24, 1946 (Thursday) ==
- The first photograph ever taken of the Earth from outer space (an altitude of 100 km or more) was made after a V-2 rocket was fitted with a movie camera, then fired from New Mexico to an altitude of 105 kilometers (65 mi). The camera was destroyed after returning to Earth, but the film survived.
- Riots, in which Hindu mobs targeted Muslim families, began in the Indian state of Bihar. Estimates of the number of deaths before the riots ended on November 11 range from 2,000 to 30,000.
- Stanford Research Institute was incorporated.

== October 25, 1946 (Friday) ==
- With the war crimes trials of top Nazi leaders having completed, indictments were handed down against 20 Nazi physicians, two administrators and an attorney for war crimes including euthanasia murder, human experimentation and medical torture. The Doctors' Trial, a series of trials, conducted at Nuremberg, would begin on December 9, 1946, and last until July 20, 1947.
- Vice-Admiral Ross T. McIntire, who had served as the physician to the President for Franklin D. Roosevelt, revealed the details of FDR's medical history, final illness, and a minute-by-minute account of the President's death on April 12, 1945. The news was occasioned by the publication, by G.P. Putnam's Sons, of McIntyre's book White House Physician.

== October 26, 1946 (Saturday) ==
- White House Press Secretary Charlie Ross announced that "for the first time in the history of White House travels, the President of the United States has his own private railroad car". The 286,520 pound, armor-plated Ferdinand Magellan car had been owned by the Association of American Railroads, which provided it for presidential use after U.S. entry into World War II. The Association sold the luxurious "rolling fortress" to the federal government for ten dollars.
- Born: Pat Sajak (stage name for Patrick Sajdak), American game show host known for Wheel of Fortune); in Chicago,

== October 27, 1946 (Sunday) ==
- In parliamentary elections in Bulgaria, the "Fatherland Front", a set of Communist political parties, captured 366 of the 465 seats in the National Assembly, and Georgi Dimitrov became prime minister. The following year, Bulgaria became a one-party state.
- For the first time in its history, Venezuela conducted an election in which every citizen 18 or over was eligible to vote, regardless of gender, property ownership, or ability to read. The vote, first ever by secret ballot, gave Accion Democratico 137 of 160 seats in the National Constituent Assembly.
- The French Fourth Republic was proclaimed, two weeks after voters had approved a new Constitution of France in a referendum.
- Born:
  - Ivan Reitman, Slovak-born Canadian film director and producer known for Ghostbusters; in Komárno, Czechoslovakia (d. 2022)
  - Leslie Byrne, first woman elected to Congress from Virginia (1993–95); in Salt Lake City, Utah

== October 28, 1946 (Monday) ==
- President Truman announced his selection for the new five-member United States Atomic Energy Commission: Sumner T. Pike, Lewis Strauss, Robert F. Bacher, William W. Waymack, and Chairman David Lilienthal.
- Markos Vafiades announced the creation of the "Democratic Army", a 13,000 member guerilla force that sought to place the Communist Party of Greece (KKE) into power.
- The real estate group "American Community Builders" announced the creation of a new suburb of Chicago, with the name of Park Forest, Illinois. The first homes were opened in August 1948, and on February 1, 1949, the village was incorporated.

== October 29, 1946 (Tuesday) ==
- Soviet Foreign Minister Vyacheslav Molotov surprised the U.N. General Assembly by calling for universal disarmament and the banning of all nuclear weapons, while hinting that the United States' monopoly on the atomic bomb might have ended.
- In a secret briefing Major General Lauris Norstad told President Truman that the only means of preventing the Soviet Union from invading Western Europe would be an air assault against 17 Soviet cities with atomic weapons. At the time, the U.S. had the means to assemble no more than nine bombs.
- European jazz guitarist Django Reinhardt arrived in the United States for the first time at the expense of Duke Ellington. Reinhardt, who flew from Paris to New York, came to the U.S. without his guitar nor anything more than the clothes that he had been wearing.
- Born: Peter Green (stage name for Peter Allen Greenbaum), guitarist for Fleetwood Mac; in Bethnal Green, London (d. 2020)

== October 30, 1946 (Wednesday) ==
- At the RCA Research Laboratories in Princeton, New Jersey, the first demonstration was made, privately, of "simultaneous color television", which would be refined by NBC and would become the system approved in the United States for color TV broadcasting. Unlike the sequential system developed by CBS, which would have required a rotating color wheel inside of a set, the RCA process transmitted images in three colors onto the screen.
- The United States, the United Kingdom, the Netherlands and France signed an agreement establishing the Caribbean Commission. The agreement entered into force on August 6, 1948, and the Commission lasted until September 15, 1961, when it was replaced by the Caribbean Organization
- Born:
  - Andrea Mitchell, American journalist for NBC Nightly News; in New York City
  - Chris Slade, Welsh-born drummer for AC/DC and Manfred Mann's Earth Band; in Pontypridd

== October 31, 1946 (Thursday) ==
- The Indonesian rupiah was introduced with a radio broadcast by Vice-President Mohammad Hatta, who urged his fellow Indonesians to use the money as a symbol of independence and economic development. The first attempt to create the new currency had been thwarted in January, when Dutch colonial authorities had seized control of the printing office and confiscated the original run of notes.
- Born:
  - Stephen Rea, Northern Irish film actor known for The Crying Game; in Belfast
  - Helen Vela, Filipino actress, television host and radio personality known for Lovingly Yours, Helen; in Manila (d. 1992)
