= 1849 Kresák =

Carbonaceous main-belt asteroid

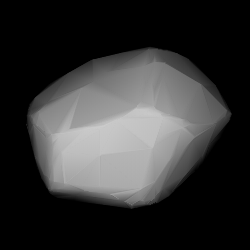
- Shape model of Kresák from its lightcurve

Discovery
- Discovered by: K. Reinmuth
- Discovery site: Heidelberg Obs.
- Discovery date: 14 January 1942

Designations
- Named after: Ľubor Kresák (Slovak astronomer)
- Alternative designations: 1942 AB · 1948 EO; 1951 WC_{2}
- Minor planet category: main-belt · (outer); Eos

Orbital characteristics
- Epoch 4 September 2017 (JD 2458000.5)
- Uncertainty parameter 0
- Observation arc: 75.29 yr (27,500 days)
- Aphelion: 3.1076 AU
- Perihelion: 3.0009 AU
- Semi-major axis: 3.0542 AU
- Eccentricity: 0.0175
- Orbital period (sidereal): 5.34 yr (1,950 days)
- Mean anomaly: 353.13°
- Mean motion: 0° 11^{m} 4.92^{s} / day
- Inclination: 10.765°
- Longitude of ascending node: 50.363°
- Argument of perihelion: 143.25°

Physical characteristics
- Dimensions: 21.776±2.427 km 26.14 km (calculated)
- Synodic rotation period: 19.1008±0.0153 h
- Geometric albedo: 0.057 (assumed); 0.114±0.032
- Spectral type: C (assumed)
- Absolute magnitude (H): 11.191±0.002 (R) · 11.28 · 11.5 · 11.61±0.32 · 11.64

1849 Kresák (prov. designation: 1942 AB) is a carbonaceous Eos asteroid from the outer region of the asteroid belt, approximately 24 kilometers in diameter. It was discovered by German astronomer Karl Reinmuth at Heidelberg Observatory in the middle of World War II on 14 January 1942. The asteroid was later named after Slovak astronomer Ľubor Kresák.

== Orbit and classification ==
Kresák is a member of the Eos family (606), the largest asteroid family in the outer main belt consisting of nearly 10,000 asteroids. It orbits the Sun in the outer main-belt at a distance of 3.0–3.1 AU once every 5 years and 4 months (1,950 days). Its orbit has an eccentricity of 0.02 and an inclination of 11° with respect to the ecliptic. The body's observation arc begins 6 days after its official discovery observation.

== Naming ==
This minor planet was named in honor of Slovak astronomer Ľubor Kresák (1927–1994) from the Slovak Academy of Sciences in Bratislava and president of IAU's Commission 20 in the 1970s.

Kresák is known for his theoretical work on meteors and the question of their relationship with comets and minor planets, as well as for the rediscovery of the short-period comet 41P/Tuttle–Giacobini–Kresák at the Skalnaté Pleso Observatory in 1951. The official naming citation was published by the Minor Planet Center on 20 February 1976 (M.P.C. 3935).

== Physical characteristics ==
Kresák has been characterized as a carbonaceous C-type asteroid.

=== Rotation period ===
In January 2012, a rotational lightcurve of Kresák was obtained from photometric observations at the Palomar Transient Factory in California. In the R-band, it gave a rotation period of 19.10 hours with a brightness variation of 0.19 magnitude (U=2).

=== Diameter and albedo ===
According to the survey carried out by NASA's Wide-field Infrared Survey Explorer with its subsequent NEOWISE mission, Kresák measures 21.7 kilometers in diameter, and its surface has an albedo of 0.114, while the Collaborative Asteroid Lightcurve Link assumes a standard albedo for carbonaceous asteroids of 0.057 and calculates a diameter of 26.1 kilometers with an absolute magnitude of 11.64.
