= September 1946 =

Month of 1946

<<	September 1946					>>
Su	Mo	Tu	We	Th	Fr	Sa
1	2	3	4	5	6	7
8	9	10	11	12	13	14
15	16	17	18	19	20	21
22	23	24	25	26	27	28
29	30

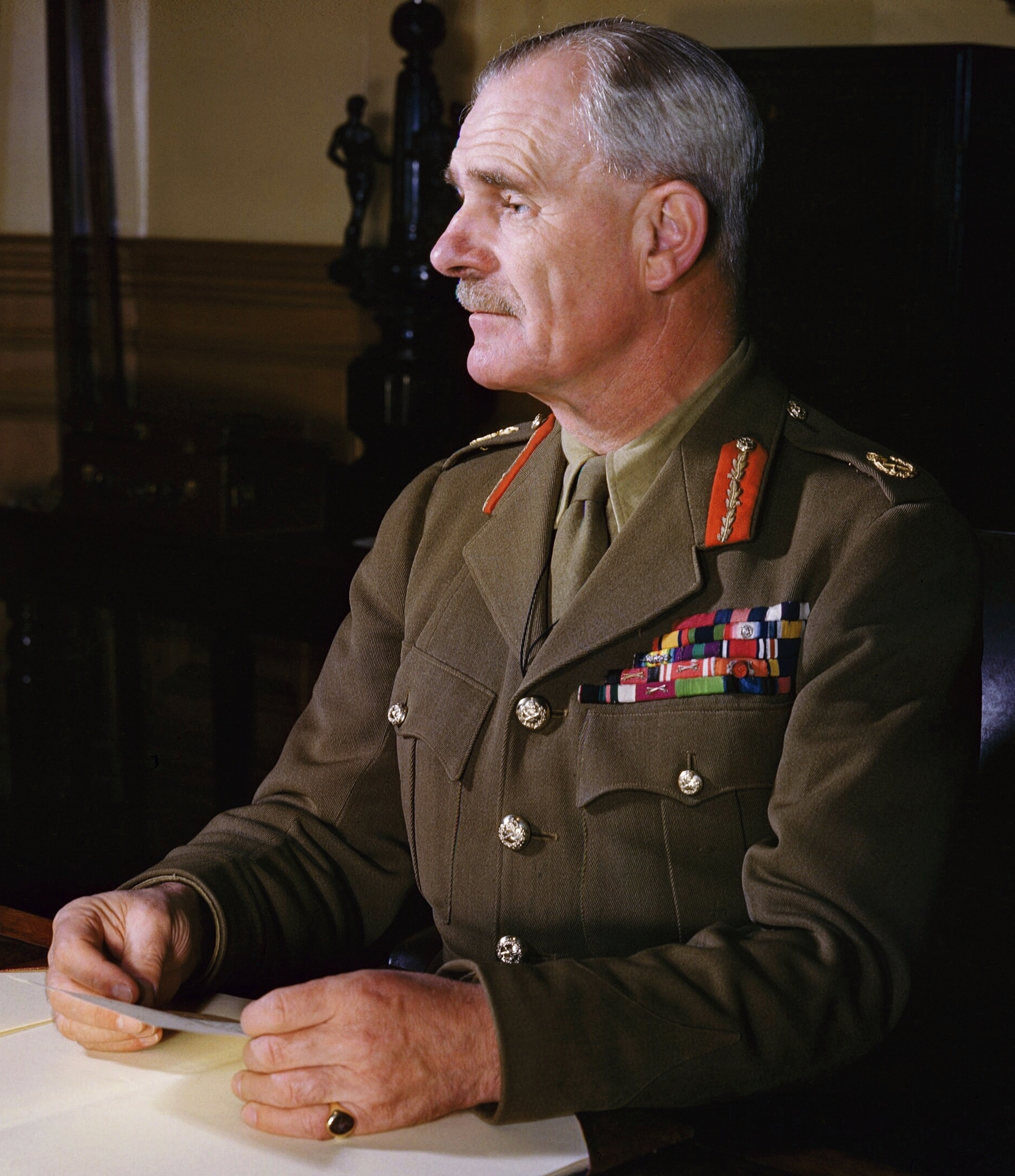
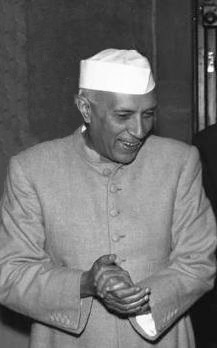
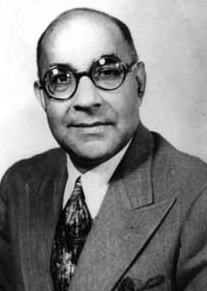
September 2, 1946: British India's Viceroy Wavell swears in transitional government and future prime ministers Nehru of India and Liaquat Ali Khan of Pakistan

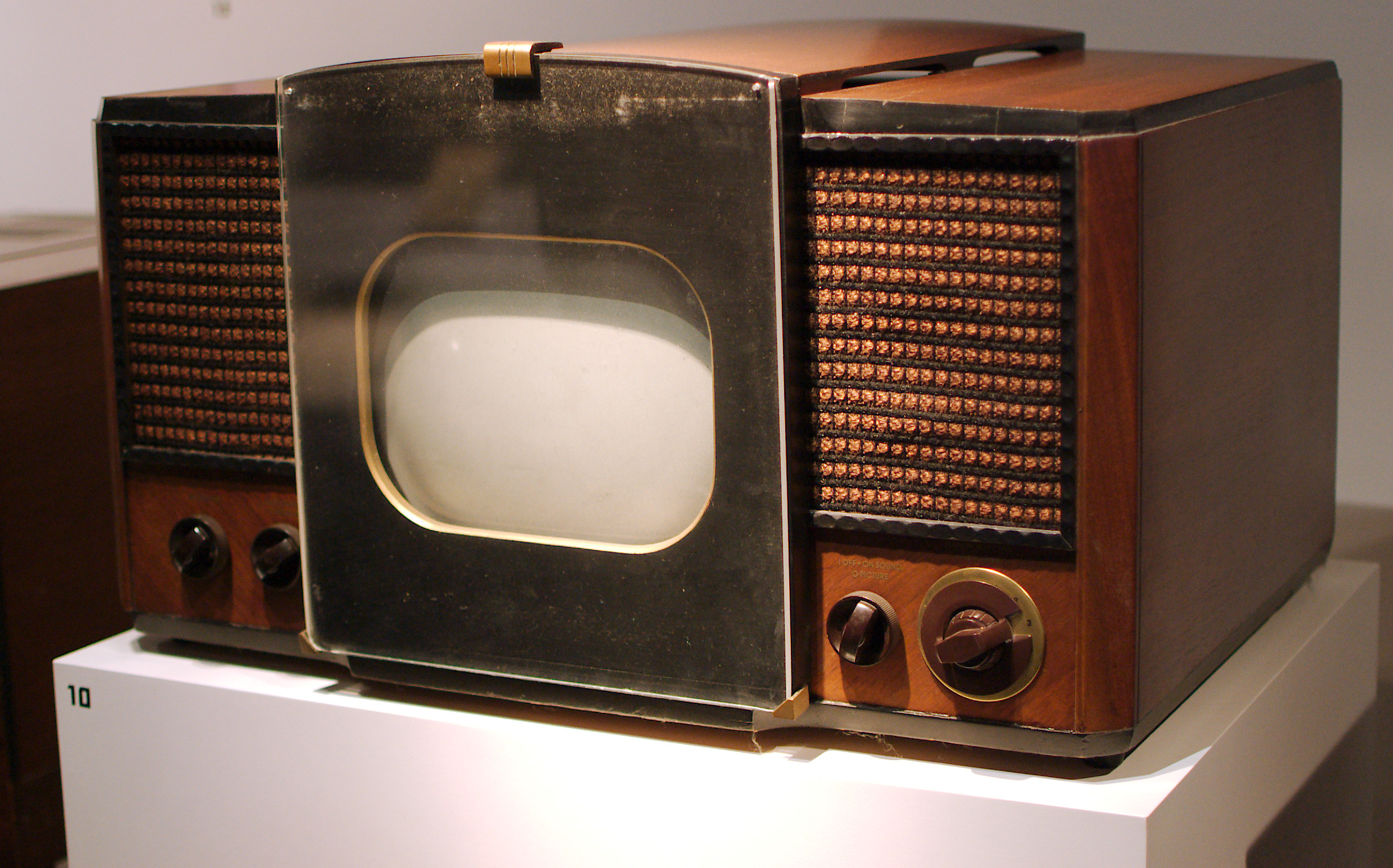
September 17, 1946: Mass production of home television sets begins as Radio Corporation of America introduces its first model, the RCA 630-TS

The following events occurred in September 1946:

== September 1, 1946 (Sunday) ==
- By a margin of 1,136,289 in favor and 524,771 against, voters in Greece approved the keeping of the monarchy. King George II returned from exile on September 27.
- Cambodia held its first elections in history. The Democrat party won a majority of seats in the legislature.
- Hawaiian sugar workers went on strike, with 21,000 workers walking off of the job on 33 plantations. The strike, which was aided by an unseasonable lack of rain, ended after 79 days, and put an end to the perquisite system that had paid the laborers with company vouchers rather than cash.
- Julia McWilliams married Paul Child, and later became famous as Julia Child.
- Born:
  - Roh Moo-hyun, 16th President of South Korea 2003 to 2008; in Gimhae (d. 2009)
  - Barry Gibb, British vocalist and guitarist for The Bee Gees; in Douglas, Isle of Man

== September 2, 1946 (Monday) ==
- An interim government for the Dominion of India was inaugurated to make the transition from British colonial rule to independence. Archibald Wavell, 1st Earl Wavell, the Viceroy of India, presided on behalf of the United Kingdom. At 11:00 am at the Viceroy's House in Delhi, Wavell administered the oath of office to Jawaharlal Nehru as vice president, and to Sardar Vallabhbhai Patel, Dr. Rajendra Prasad, Asaf Ali, Sarat Chandra Bose, and Syed Ali Zaheer. Other members of the Executive Council included Liaquat Ali Khan, Finance Minister, who would become the first Prime Minister of Pakistan, were Sir John Mathai, Sardar Baldev Singh, Shri Jagjivan Ram, and Chakravarti Rajagopalachari
- Born: Billy Preston, American soul musician; in Houston (d. 2006)

== September 3, 1946 (Tuesday) ==
- U.S. President Harry S. Truman approved the go-ahead for "Project Paperclip", ostensibly a campaign to bring German scientists to the U.S., and to keep them from being taken to the U.S.S.R. Many of the scientists had been former Nazis, and assisted in experimentation on human subjects with radiation, oxygen deprivation and flash blindness.

== September 4, 1946 (Wednesday) ==
- An Air France plane bound for London crashed moments after takeoff, when it failed to clear the roof of a factory at Le Bourget, killing 20 persons. The evening before, another Air France plane crashed as it approached Copenhagen from Paris, killing all 22 persons on board.
- The Ben Hecht-written play A Flag is Born, advocating the creation of a homeland for the Jewish people in Israel, opened on Broadway.
- The comedy film Monsieur Beaucaire starring Bob Hope was released.
- Died: Nobu Shirase, 85, leader of the Japanese Antarctic Expedition of 1911–1912

== September 5, 1946 (Thursday) ==
- Trans-Luxury Airlines Flight 850, on its way (with several stops) from New York to San Francisco, crashed into a hillside as it attempted to land in Elko, Nevada, killing 21 of the 22 people on board. A 2-year-old boy survived the accident with only minor injuries.
- The Tuskegee Airmen unit was disbanded and the base at Tuskegee, Alabama, was closed.
- Born:
  - Freddie Mercury, singer and songwriter for the rock group (Queen), as Farrokh Bulsara; in Stone Town, Zanzibar (d. 1991).
  - Dennis Dugan, American actor, director, and producer.
  - Kyongae Chang, South Korean astrophysicist.

== September 6, 1946 (Friday) ==
- U.S. Secretary of State James F. Byrnes delivered the speech "Restatement of Policy on Germany" in Stuttgart. The address, described as "an important reversal of the American position on Germany", signaled a plan to build the conquered German nation into a "self-sustaining" state that would be able to resist the spread of Communism.
- The All-America Football Conference held its first game, kicking off at 8:30 pm as the Cleveland Browns hosted the Miami Seahawks. The Browns won 44-0 before a record crowd of 60,135 fans.

== September 7, 1946 (Saturday) ==
- Royal Air Force Captain Teddy Donaldson set a new official speed record, flying a Gloster Meteor at 615.78 miles per hour in level flight, or Mach 0.81 at 1,100 feet.
- In the fourth major airline accident in five days, a British South American Airways airliner crashed shortly after takeoff from Bathurst (modern day Banjul, capital of the Gambia). Only one of the 24 persons on board survived.

== September 8, 1946 (Sunday) ==
- Voters in Bulgaria approved the abolition of the monarchy and the creation of a republic, by a reported margin of 3,801,160 to 171,000. Nine-year-old Tsar Simeon II and his mother, Queen Ioanna, went into exile in Italy. The boy king, last Bulgarian monarch of the House of Saxe-Coburg and Gotha, would return to power 55 years later as Simeon Sakskoburggotski, Prime Minister of Bulgaria.
- Born:
  - Beriz Belkić, President of Bosnia and Herzegovina 2001–02; in Sarajevo (d. 2023)
  - Wong Kan Seng, Singaporean business executive, Deputy Prime Minister of Singapore 2005–2011; in Singapore
- Died: Dorothy Harrison Eustis, 60, philanthropist who founded The Seeing Eye, the first school in the U.S. to train guide dogs, an idea pioneered in Germany. The canines trained to aid blind persons are often referred to as seeing-eye dogs.

== September 9, 1946 (Monday) ==
- Trans Australia Airlines (TAA) made its inaugural flight, a trip from Melbourne to Sydney. The government-owned carrier, which operated domestically, changed its name to Australian Airlines in 1986, and then was merged with Qantas in 1993.
- Born: Anna Lee Walters, American author; in Pawnee, Oklahoma

== September 10, 1946 (Tuesday) ==
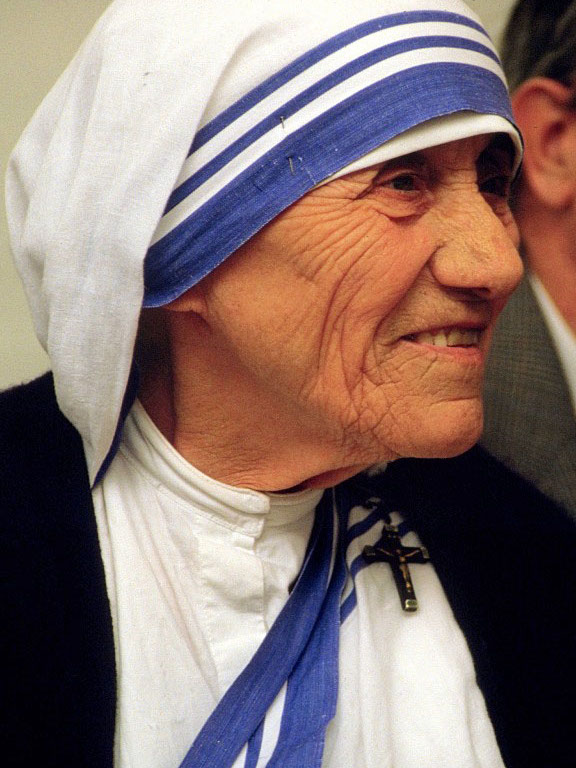
Agnes Bojaxhiu, better known as Mother Teresa

- In what is now celebrated among the Missionaries of Charity as "Inspiration Day", 36-year-old Sister Agnes Teresa Bojaxhiu of the Loreto Sisters' Convent experienced what she would describe as the "call within a call". She was traveling on a train from Siliguri to Darjeeling when she heard the call of God: "I was to leave the convent and help the poor while living among them.". As one author later noted, "Though no one knew it at the time, Sister Teresa had just become Mother Teresa".
- Fred Morrison, an American fighter pilot during World War II, first sketched his idea for a toy plastic disc could fly through the air after it was thrown. He called his invention the "Whirlo-Way". By 1955, he sold a lighter version, the "Pluto Platter", to the Wham-O toy company, which manufactured millions of the discs under the brand name Frisbee.
- With workers at Pittsburgh's electric utility threatening a walkout, and management standing firm against their demands, citizens of the 10th largest city in the U.S. braced for a 12:01 a.m. shutdown of all electric power. To their surprise, the blackout never came, as a judge issued an injunction at midnight.
- Born:
  - Jim Hines, American track athlete and 100 meter dash record holder 1968–83; in Dumas, Arkansas (d. 2023)
  - Don Powell, English rock drummer for Slade; in Bilston, Staffordshire

== September 11, 1946 (Wednesday) ==
- The Brooklyn Dodgers and the visiting Cincinnati Reds played the longest scoreless tie in Major League Baseball history, going for 19 innings in 4 hours, 40 minutes, before the game was called because of darkness.
- The United States turned over $1,121,400,000 worth of surplus U.S. Army property to the Philippines, including vehicles, construction equipment, prefab structures, clothing, medicine, food and other items. The material had been stockpiled in the Philippines after its recapture by the Allies, for the planned invasion of Japan.
- Died: Ida Stover Eisenhower, 84, mother of General Dwight D. Eisenhower

== September 12, 1946 (Thursday) ==
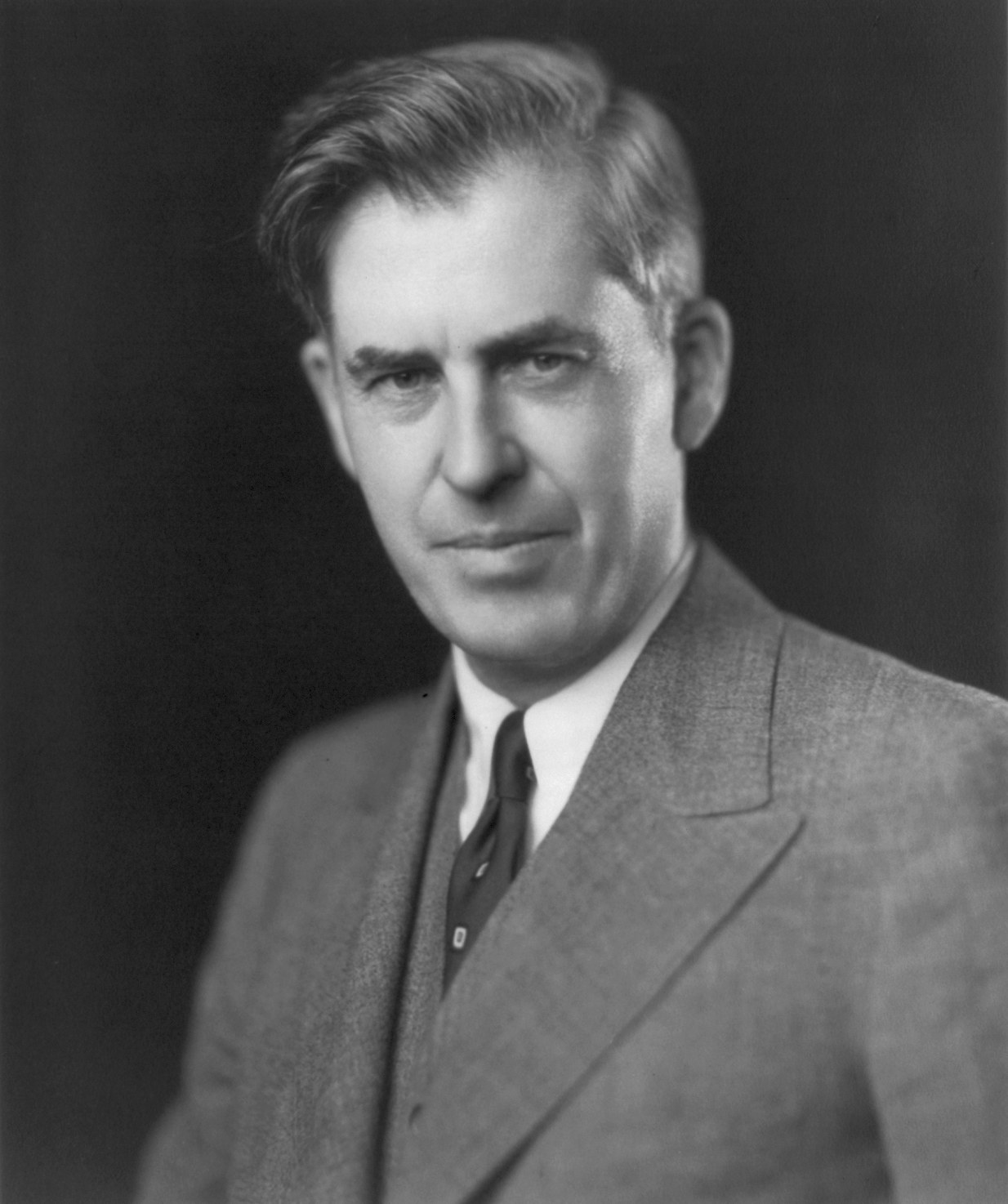
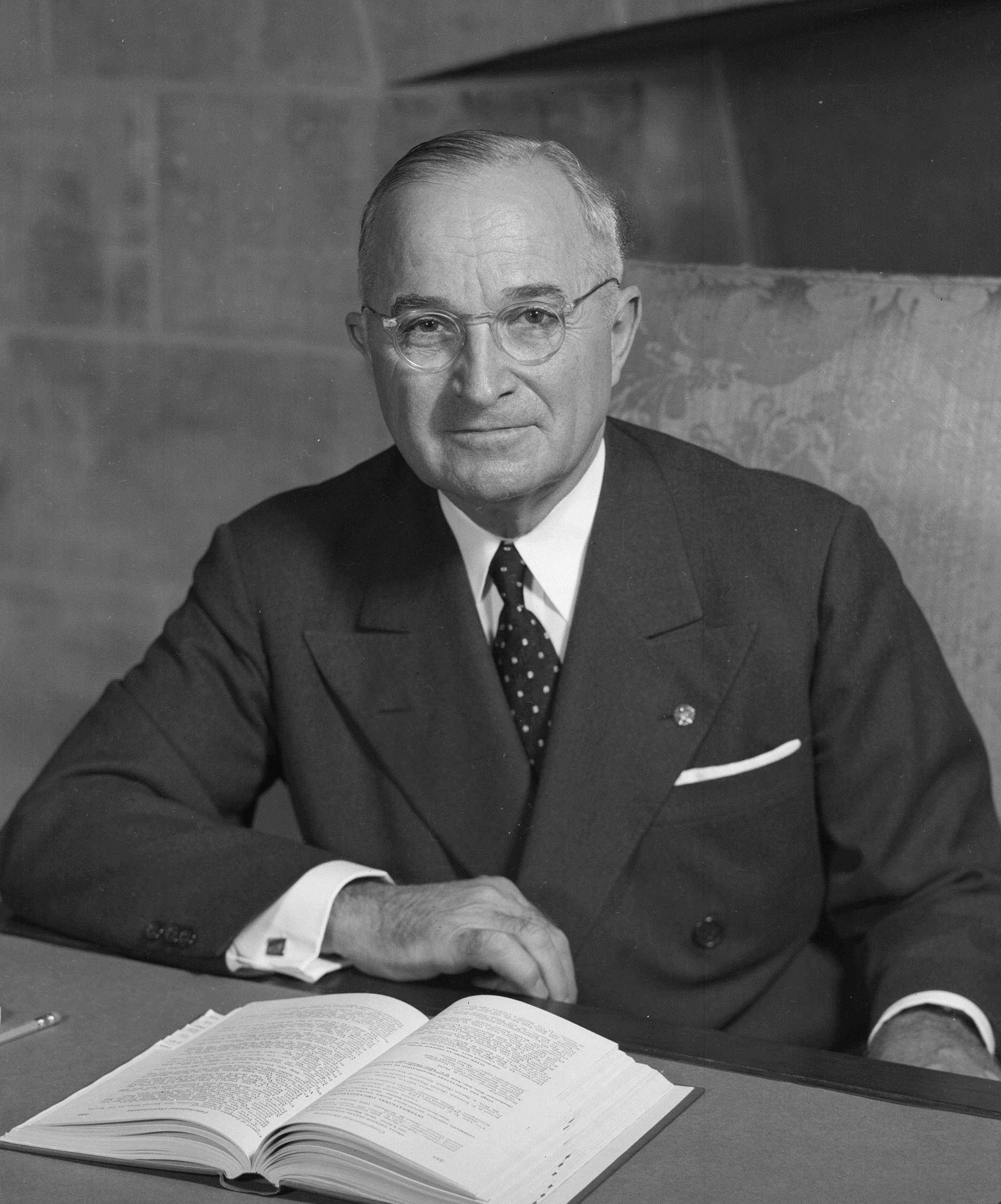
Commerce Secretary Wallace and President Truman
- U.S. Secretary of Commerce Henry A. Wallace delivered a speech at a rally at Madison Square Garden, contradicting the statement of foreign policy that had been made six days earlier by Secretary of State Byrnes, embarrassing President Harry S. Truman, and bringing an end to Wallace's career in government. Truman, who had glanced at the speech two days earlier, was asked at a press conference about the speech and whether it "represented the policy of his administration", and replied that it was. That evening, Wallace declared that "We have no more business in the political affairs of Eastern Europe than Russia has in the political affairs of Latin America, Western Europe and the United States... and just two days ago, when President Truman read these words, he said they represented the policy of his Administration.". Truman compounded the error by making the excuse that "It was my intention to express the thought that I approved the right of the Secretary of Commerce to deliver that speech. I did not intend to indicate that I approved the speech" which TIME magazine described as a "clumsy lie".
- Born: Neil Lyndon, British journalist and writer, known for his book No More Sex War: The Failures of Feminism

== September 13, 1946 (Friday) ==
- Captain Amon Göth, 37, Nazi SS officer who had carried out the mass executions of more than 13,000 Jews in Kraków and Tarnów, and the Szebnia concentration camp, was hanged, along with Dr. Leon Gross, a Jew who had collaborated with him at the Plaszow concentration camp. Captain Göth was portrayed by Ralph Fiennes in the film Schindler's List.
- Ten days after the United States launched Project Paperclip, the Soviet Union issued decree No. 2163-880s, launching Operation Osoaviakhim, to transfer German rocket production potential to the USSR.
- The Boston Red Sox clinched the American League pennant, after Ted Williams hit an inside-the-park home run for a 1–0 win over the Cleveland Indians.
- Dr. Willis J. Potts performed the first aorta-to-pulmonary artery anastomosis to correct a congenital heart defect, a surgery later called the Potts shunt. The first patient was a 21-month-old girl at Children's Memorial Hospital in Chicago. The surgery was performed on 658 more patients until being discontinued in 1967 because of complications that often arose.
- Died: George Washington Hill, 61, President of American Tobacco Company, who increased cigarette sales worldwide over a 21-year period.

== September 14, 1946 (Saturday) ==
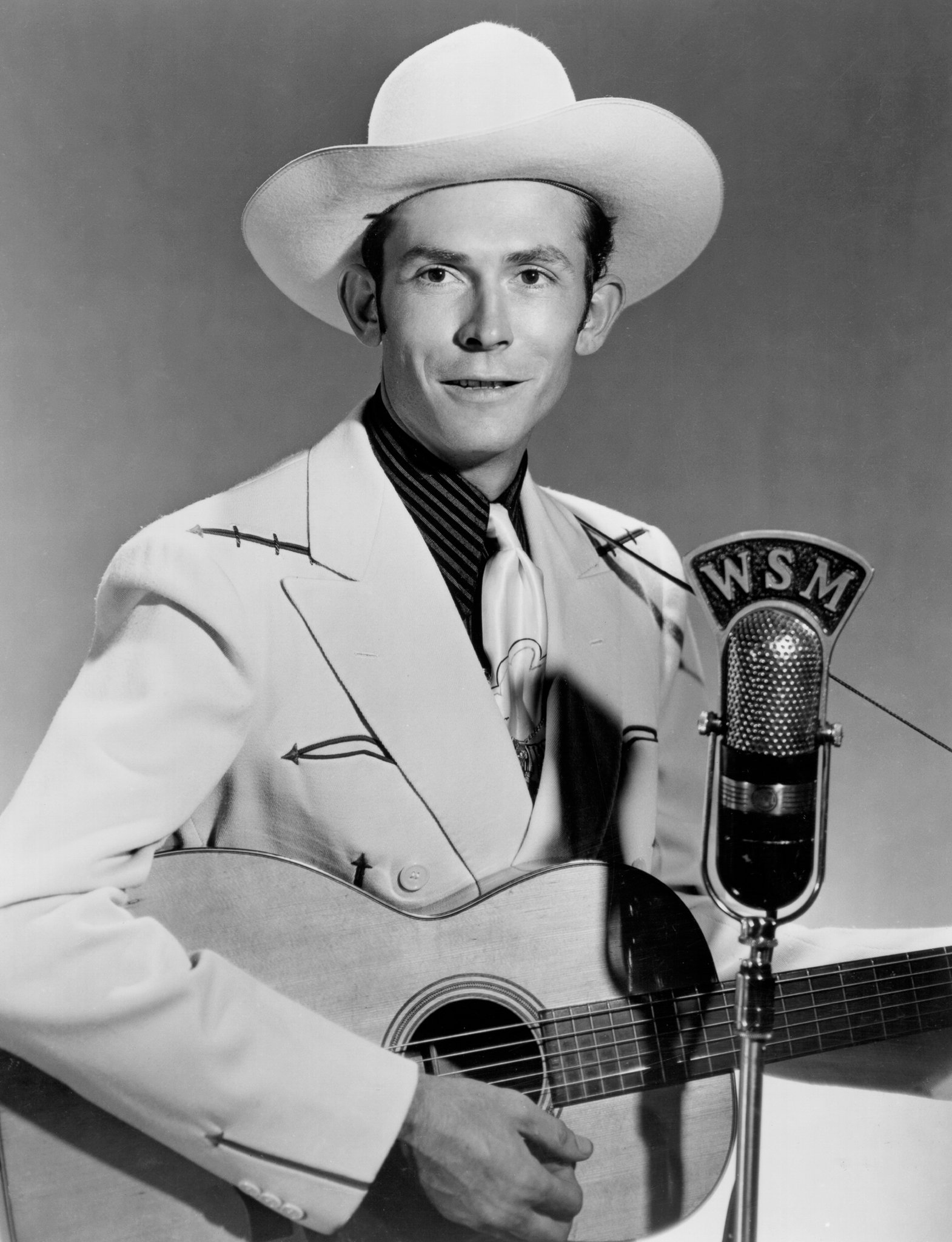
Hank Williams

- The U.S. Census Bureau forecast that the United States population in 1990 would peak at 165,000,000 and that it would decline to 168,177,000 by 2000. The actual figures for the two censuses were 248,709,873 in 1990 and 281,421,906 in 2000.
- Hiram King "Hank" Williams began his celebrated career as a country musician, signing a contract with Fred Rose in Nashville.
- Ivan Serov completed his report to Joseph Stalin about the fate of Stalin's son, Lt. Yakov Dzhugashvili, who had been captured by the Germans in World War II, and killed in 1943 while attempting to escape from the POW camp at Sachsenhausen.
- Ho Chi Minh left Paris after being forced into signing an unfavorable agreement with France. During his stay, the future President of North Vietnam had visited the American Embassy in a fruitless attempt to obtain assistance from the United States.
- Rev. Wilbert Awdry's Thomas the Tank Engine, the second book in The Railway Series for children, was published in the U.K.
- In a referendum on independence, residents of the small Faroe Islands voted 5,660 to 5,500 in favor of independence from Denmark. Approximately 25,000 people lived on 17 of the 21 islands in the group.

== September 15, 1946 (Sunday) ==
- One week after the referendum abolishing the monarchy, the People's Republic of Bulgaria was declared in Sofia, with Vasil Kolarov as the Eastern European nation's first President.
- American fashion designer Dee Dee Johnson fell 50 feet and had to be rescued from the South Rim of the Grand Canyon while conducting a photo shoot modeling pedal pushers. Park rangers William Bowen and Dean Dazey rescued Johnson, but the rope rescue left her topless, much to her chagrin.
- Born:
  - Tommy Lee Jones, American film actor; in San Saba, Texas
  - Oliver Stone, American film director; in New York City. Jones and Stone were both nominated for Academy Awards for their work in the film JFK and collaborated again in Natural Born Killers
  - Tetsu Nakamura, Japanese-Afghan physician; in Fukuoka (d. 2019)

== September 16, 1946 (Monday) ==
- After drought and a poor harvest added to a famine in the Soviet Union, a governmental decree went into effect, doubling the price for rations of meat and dairy products, and tripling the price of bread. On September 27, another decree reduced the number of people entitled to bread rations. The famine lasted into 1947, costing more than a million lives.
- At his factory in Maranello, Italian auto manufacturer Enzo Ferrari produced his first V12 engine, the component that would set the Ferrari as a leader in the production of sports cars.
- Owners of baseball's National League and American League teams met in New York City and, according to Dodgers' owner Branch Rickey and baseball commissioner Happy Chandler, secretly voted 15–1 to approve an August 27 recommendation against allowing African American players into the major leagues. Although other owners disputed the story, Chandler's copy of the committee report was discovered after Chandler's death, when his papers had been donated to the University of Kentucky.

== September 17, 1946 (Tuesday) ==
- Mass production of television sets began, with RCA producing the first new TV since World War II, a 10-inch set made at its plant in Camden, New Jersey. Only 5,000 sets had been produced in the years before the U.S. entered the war. By the end of 1947, 150,000 had been sold, rising to 4 million in 1949 and 10 million in 1950.

== September 18, 1946 (Wednesday) ==
- Hidden in the Warsaw Ghetto by the Ojneg-Szabes group during the Second World War, the archive of materials that had been written during the siege was unearthed. Dr. Emmanuel Ringelblum supervised the writing, collection, storage (in watertight milk cans) and burial for future generations to read.
- Mound Metalcraft, Inc., was founded in Mound, Minnesota, by Lynn E. Baker, Avery F. Crounse and Alvin F. Tesch. In 1947, the company introduced the first Tonka toys, a line of durable metal toy trucks and other equipment.

== September 19, 1946 (Thursday) ==
- In a speech at Zürich, former British Prime Minister Winston Churchill proposed what would eventually become the European Community. Churchill suggested "a remedy, which, if generously and spontaneously adopted by a great majority of the people of many lands, would, as if by a miracle, transform the whole scene and make Europe as free and happy as Switzerland is today... We must build a kind of United States of Europe."
- The first Cannes Film Festival was held, taking place at the city of the same name on the French Riviera. The event had originally been planned for September 1, 1939, the day that World War II began, and postponed until the war's end.
- Walter F. White, executive director of the NAACP, and five other civil rights activists met at the White House with President Truman to ask for the help of the U.S. government in ending violence against African-Americans. Although White had met in the past with Presidents Coolidge, Hoover and Roosevelt without success, Truman was horrified by the description of the blinding of Isaac Woodard, and ordered Attorney General Tom Clark to begin working on "the inauguration of some sort of policy to prevent such happenings".
- Born: Gerald Brisco, professional wrestler; in Oklahoma City, Oklahoma

== September 20, 1946 (Friday) ==
- President Truman fired Secretary of Commerce Henry Wallace, eight days after Wallace's controversial speech in New York. Noting that "the Government of the United States must stand as a unit in its relations with the rest of the world", President Truman announced, "I have today asked Mr. Wallace to resign from the Cabinet."
- The landscape of the American and Canadian Niagara Falls was permanently altered when a 120-foot (37 m) wide section of rock collapsed at 10:19 a.m.
- The 1st Cannes Film Festival opened in France.

== September 21, 1946 (Saturday) ==
- The KB Toys business was created by brothers Harry Kaufman and Joseph Kaufman, who had operated the Kaufman Brothers wholesale candy business since 1922 and then acquired a toy company from a debtor and moved into becoming a wholesale seller of toys under the trade name Kay-Bee Toy & Hobby Stores, later a chain of retail stores.
- Died: Vincent Benevento, 46, self-styled "Cheese King of Chicago", was murdered while vacationing in Lake Zurich, Illinois. After surviving being shot 10 times in a 1945 attack, Benevento died after being shot 7 more times in the new incident.

== September 22, 1946 (Sunday) ==
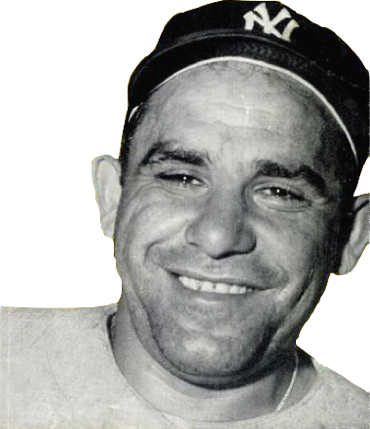
Berra

- Yogi Berra made his major league debut, entering a game for the New York Yankees against the Philadelphia A's. Berra hit a home run in his first time at bat, and then went on to a colorful career.

== September 23, 1946 (Monday) ==
- In what would later become South Vietnam, the Commissioner of the French-controlled Autonomous Republic of Cochin-China issued an order authorizing the arrest of any Asian resident whose identity papers were not in order. Police and the French Army arrested more than 50,000 Vietnamese and conscripted them to work at the area's rubber plantations.
- The Løgting, legislature for the Faroe Islands, voted 12–11 in favor of creating a nation independent of Denmark, which had ruled since the year 1386, in accordance with the September 15 plebiscite. King Christian X dissolved the Iagting the next day and denied the resolution. On September 9, 1947, a new Faroen parliament would accept a Danish proposal for autonomy in a continued union with Denmark.

== September 24, 1946 (Tuesday) ==
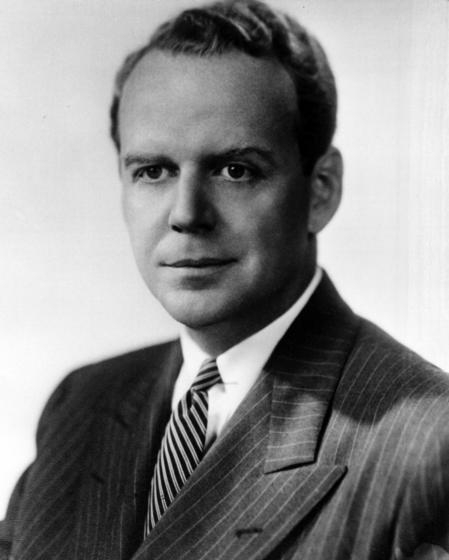
Clifford

- White House counsel Clark Clifford presented President Truman with a top secret report, authored by George Elsey, entitled "American Relations with the Soviet Union". "The U.S. must be prepared to wage atomic and biological warfare", the report stated in part, adding that "a war with the USSR would be 'total' in a more horrible sense than any previous war and there must be constant research for both offensive and defensive weapons." In her biography of her father, Margaret Truman wrote that when Clifford said that only ten copies existed, Truman told him, "I want the other nine." The Clifford-Elsey Report remained secret until 20 years later when a copy was given to Arthur Krock of The New York Times.
- Roy C. Farrell and Sydney H. de Kantzow founded Cathay Pacific Airways.
- Born:
  - "Mean Joe Greene", American NFL player and Hall of Famer; as Charles Edward Greene in Temple, Texas
  - Lars Emil Johansen, 2nd Prime Minister of Greenland, 1991–1997; in Illorsuit
- Died: Jeff Tesreau, 57, American baseball pitcher

== September 25, 1946 (Wednesday) ==
- African-American actor Canada Lee surprised and impressed audiences at Boston's Shubert Theatre, portraying Daniel de Bosola in a production of The Duchess of Malfi. In a reversal of the longtime practice of white men donning blackface, Lee "opened a new field for Negro actors today by donning white makeup and portraying a white character for the first time in the history of the American stage", according to a UPI report. In the production that opened September 23 and continued to Broadway, Lee wore a special white paste that had been used medically, to cover burns and marks, but had never before been used in the theatre.
- Born: Bishan Singh Bedi, Indian cricketer; in Amritsar, Punjab Province, British India)
- Died: Dr. Hans Eppinger, physician at Dachau who oversaw experiments on making seawater drinkable. Eppinger committed suicide as the Nuremberg War Crimes Trials were concluding.

== September 26, 1946 (Thursday) ==
- Aung San, who had led the fight against British colonial rule of Burma as leader of the Anti-Fascist People's Freedom League, agreed to become part of the interim government that would form an independent nation. Sir Hubert Rance, the British Governor and Chairman of the Executive Council, had been given permission to negotiate with the AFPFL, and Aung San became the Deputy Chairman.
- Born:
  - Christine Todd Whitman, first woman Governor of New Jersey (1994–2001), EPA Administrator (2001–03); in New York City
  - Andrea Dworkin, American crusader against pornography; in Camden, New Jersey (d. 2005)

== September 27, 1946 (Friday) ==
- Nikolai V. Novikov, the Soviet ambassador to the United States, sent a long telegram to his boss, Foreign Minister Vyacheslav Molotov, describing U.S. foreign policy as reflecting "imperialistic tendencies of monopolistic American capital" and "a striving for world supremacy". Analogous to George F. Kennan's February 22 "long telegram", the Novikov cable helped shape strategy for one nation against its greatest adversary during the Cold War. Classified for years, the cable was not released until 1990 as part of the "Conduct of the Cold War" conferences.
- Defending world middleweight boxing champion Tony Zale retained his title against heavily favored challenger Rocky Graziano, in a bout at Yankee Stadium. A crowd of 39,827 watched Zale, fighting after four years of World War II service, knock Graziano out midway through the sixth round.
- Died: Geoffrey de Havilland Jr., British test pilot, was killed when his DH-108 jet, the Swallow, broke apart as he reached Mach 0.875 while attempting supersonic flight.

== September 28, 1946 (Saturday) ==
- In Australia's national election, the Australian Labor Party, led by Prime Minister Ben Chifley, retained its majority in both houses of the parliament, with 30 of the 36 seats in the Senate, and 43 of the 74 House of Representatives posts.
- King George II of Greece returned to the throne, four years after fleeing to the United Kingdom, stepping ashore at Piraeus at 10:00 am. Hours after greeting the monarch on his return, Prime Minister Constantine Tsaldaris and his entire cabinet resigned.
- The popular NBC radio program, National Barn Dance, was broadcast for the last time.
- U.S. Army General and future United States President Dwight D. Eisenhower said at a press conference in Frankfurt that nuclear weapons should be made illegal, stating "I believe the outlawing of the atom bomb is the outlawing of wars... I think the time has come when humanity is intelligent enough to do away with war."
- Born: Jeffrey Jones, American actor, best known as Mr. Rooney in Ferris Bueller's Day Off; in Buffalo, New York

== September 29, 1946 (Sunday) ==
- The St. Louis Cardinals and the Brooklyn Dodgers both lost their final scheduled game of the season in the National League, finishing with identical 96-58 records and forcing the first tiebreaker playoff in Major League Baseball history.
- The Newark Eagles beat the Kansas City Monarchs, 3–2, to win Game 7 of the 1946 Negro World Series and the championship.
- Died: Raimu (stage name for Jules Auguste Muraire), 62, French actor

== September 30, 1946 (Monday) ==
- The Nuremberg War Crimes Tribunal announced its verdicts on 21 members of the Nazi German regime. Three (Franz von Papen, Hjalmar Schacht and Hans Fritzsche) were acquitted, and the other 18 were convicted of crimes against humanity, receiving sentences the next day ranging from 10 years to death by hanging
- Born:
  - Héctor Lavoe, Puerto Rican singer; in Ponce (d. 1993)
  - Claude Vorilhon, French-born 'messenger' of Raëlism; in Vichy
- Died:
  - Takashi Sakai, 58, Japanese general who oversaw the brutal Japanese occupation of Hong Kong during World War II, was executed in China by a firing squad
  - Ernst Späth, 60, Austrian chemist
