= C/1905 X1 (Giacobini) =

Parabolic comet

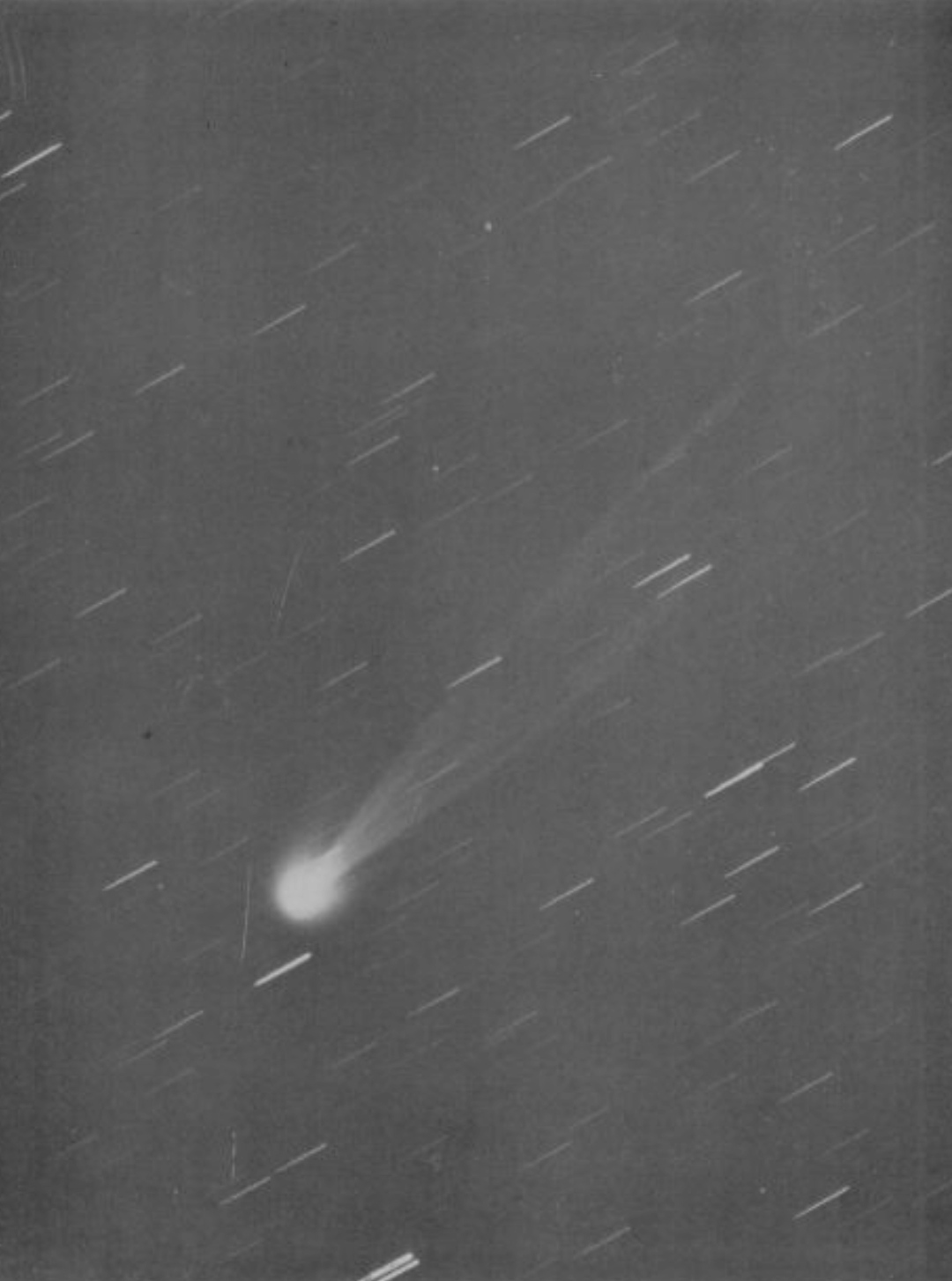
- Giacobini's Comet photographed by Edward E. Barnard on 29 December 1905

Discovery
- Discovered by: Michel Giacobini
- Discovery site: Nice, France
- Discovery date: 7 December 1905

Designations
- Alternative designations: 1905c 1906 I

Orbital characteristics
- Epoch: 13 January 1906 (JD 2417223.5)
- Observation arc: 81 days
- Number of observations: 41
- Perihelion: 0.216 AU
- Eccentricity: ~1.000
- Inclination: 43.65°
- Longitude of ascending node: 93.37°
- Argument of periapsis: 199.22°
- Last perihelion: 22 December 1906
- Earth MOID: 0.413 AU
- Jupiter MOID: 0.253 AU

Physical characteristics
- Comet nuclear magnitude (M2): 8.3
- Apparent magnitude: 0.7 (1906 apparition)

Giacobini's Comet, also known as C/1905 X1, is a bright parabolic comet that became visible to the naked eye in January 1906. It is one of 12 comets discovered by French astronomer, Michel Giacobini.

== Observational history ==
While observing at the Nice Observatory in France, Michel Giacobini discovered the comet as an 8th-magnitude object within the constellation Boötes. (Note: Reported initial position upon discovery was: α = 14^{h} 21.7^{m} , δ = 20° 59′) Throughout December 1905, the comet continued to brighten as it slowly approached both the Earth and the Sun, allowing follow-up observations to be conducted.
