= 8P/Tuttle =

Periodic comet

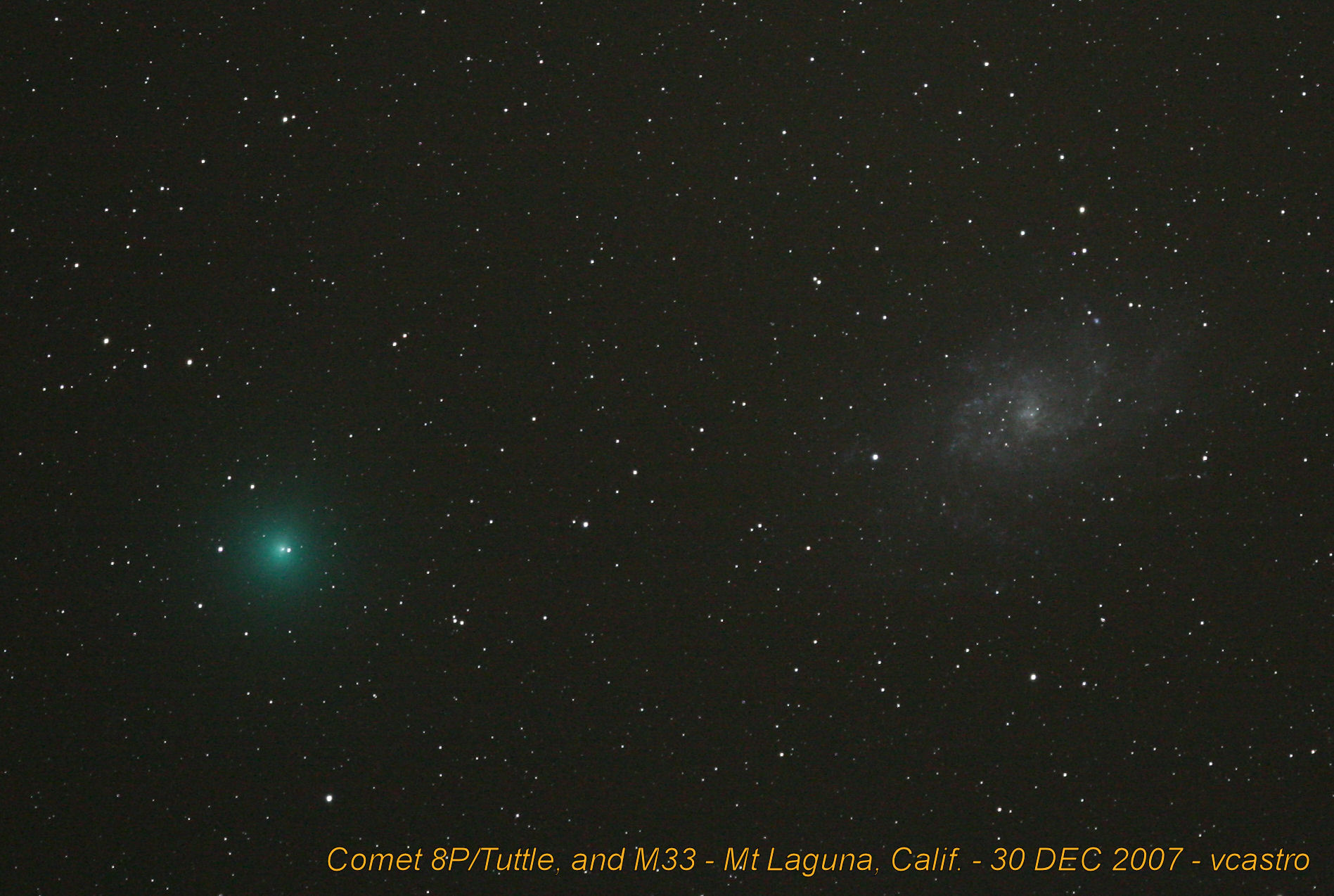
- Tuttle's Comet and the Triangulum Galaxy photographed from Mount Laguna, California on December 30, 2007

Discovery
- Discovered by: Horace Parnell Tuttle
- Discovery date: January 5, 1858

Designations
- MPC designation: P/1790 A2, P/1858 A1; P/1871 T1
- Alternative designations: 1790 II, 1858 I, 1871 III; 1885 IV, 1899 III; 1912 IV, 1926 IV; 1939 X, 1967 V; 1980 XIII, 1994 XV

Orbital characteristics
- Epoch: January 21, 2022 (JD 2459600.5)
- Observation arc: 232.14 years (Note: Observation arc from the Minor Planet Center database only covered dates from 9 August 1885 until 20 March 2022 (136.61 years). This figure includes its entire arc up to 28 January 1790.)
- Earliest precovery date: January 28, 1790
- Number of observations: 1,916
- Aphelion: 10.39 AU
- Perihelion: 1.026 AU
- Semi-major axis: 5.707 AU
- Eccentricity: 0.82023
- Orbital period: 13.6 years
- Inclination: 54.911°
- Longitude of ascending node: 270.20°
- Argument of periapsis: 207.49°
- Mean anomaly: 10.573°
- Last perihelion: August 27, 2021
- Next perihelion: April 18, 2035
- T_{Jupiter}: 1.601
- Earth MOID: 0.095 AU
- Jupiter MOID: 0.738 AU

Physical characteristics
- Dimensions: 4.5 km (2.8 mi)
- Mean density: 650±120 kg/m^{3}
- Synodic rotation period: 11.4 hours
- Spectral type: (V–R) = 0.53±0.04
- Comet total magnitude (M1): 14.6

8P/Tuttle (also known as Tuttle's Comet or Comet Tuttle) is a periodic comet with a 13.6-year orbit. It fits the classical definition of a Jupiter-family comet with an orbital period of less than 20 years, but does not fit the modern definition of (2 < T_{Jupiter}< 3). Its last perihelion passage was 27 August 2021 when it had a solar elongation of 26 degrees at approximately apparent magnitude 9. Two weeks later, on September 12, 2021, it was about 1.8 AU (270 million km) from Earth which is about as far from Earth as the comet can get when the comet is near perihelion.

Comet 8P/Tuttle is responsible for the Ursid meteor shower in late December.

== 2008 perihelion ==
Animation of 8P/Tuttle from 2005 to 2025 Sun · Venus · Earth · Mars · Jupiter · Saturn · 8P/Tuttle

Under dark skies, the comet was a naked-eye object. On December 30, 2007, it was in close conjunction with the Triangulum Galaxy. On January 1, 2008, it passed Earth at a distance of 0.25282 AU (37.821 million km). It was visible telescopically to Southern Hemisphere observers in the constellation Eridanus throughout February 2008.

Predictions that the 2007 Ursid meteor shower could have possibly been stronger than usual due to the return of the comet, did not appear to materialize, as counts were in the range of normal distribution.

== Physical characteristics ==
Radar observations of Comet Tuttle in January 2008 by the Arecibo Observatory show it to be a contact binary. The comet nucleus is estimated at 4.5 km (2.8 mi) in diameter, using the equivalent diameter of a sphere having a volume equal to the sum of a 3 km × 4 km (1.9 mi × 2.5 mi) sphere.

== Exploration ==
In 2019, 8P/Tuttle was listed as one of 10 backup targets of the European Space Agency's Comet Interceptor mission. Scheduled for launch on 2029, the spacecraft may conduct a flyby of 8P on March 26, 2035 if selected.

== Gallery ==
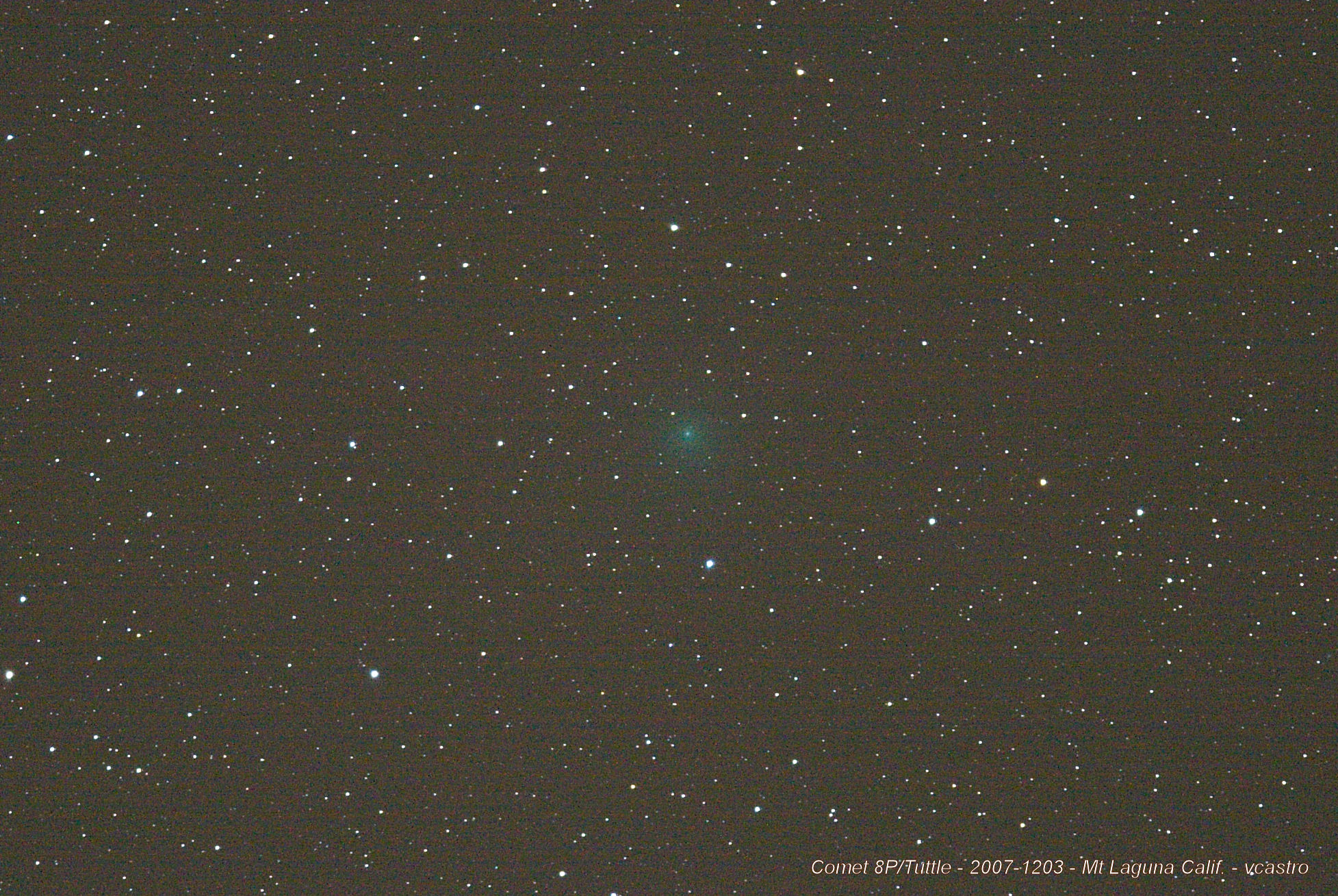
8P/Tuttle on December 3, 2007 from Mount Laguna, California

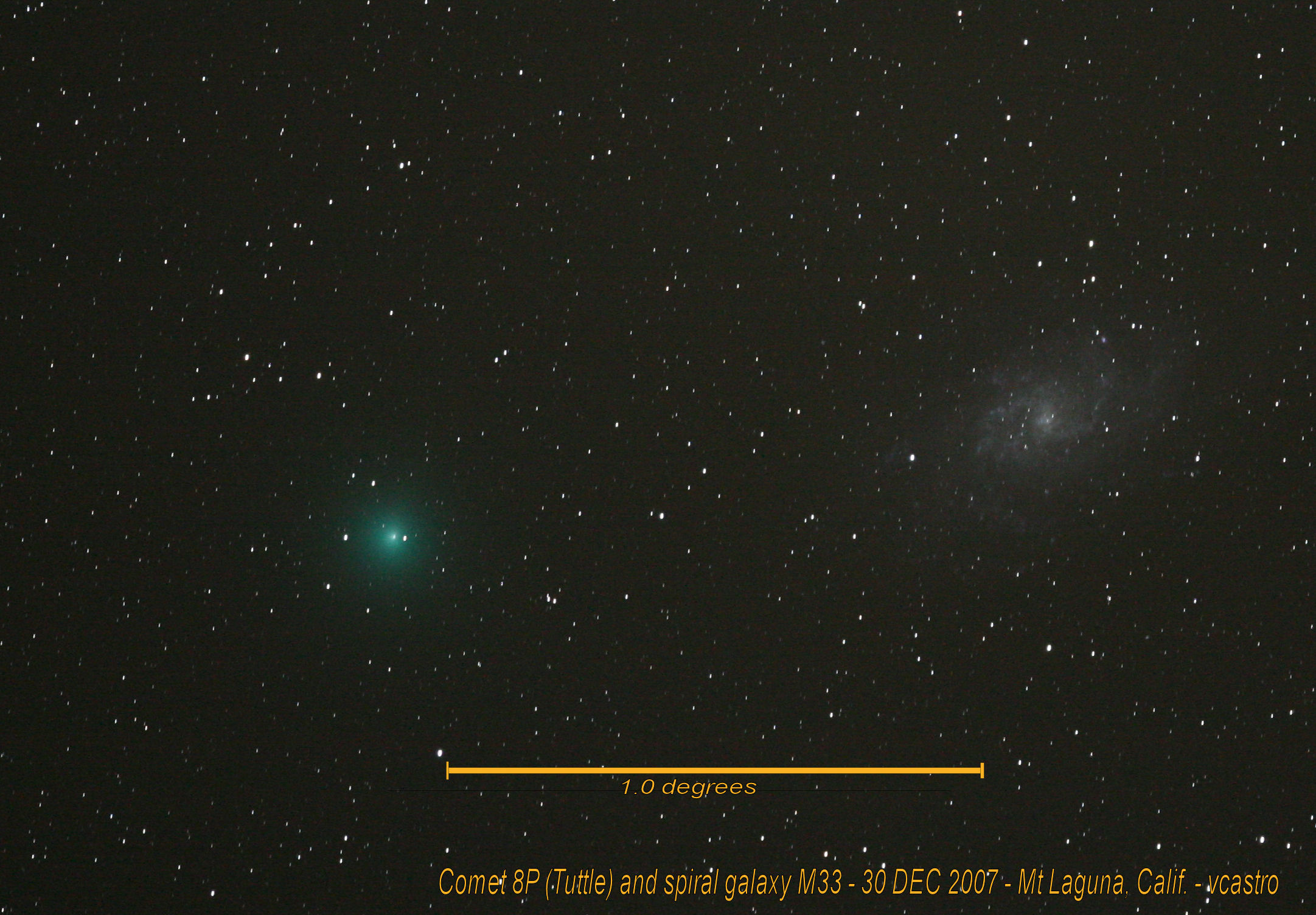
8P/Tuttle about 1.2 degrees from M33 on December 30, 2007.

8P/Tuttle on Feb 2, 2008 from the Red Sea coast of Egypt.

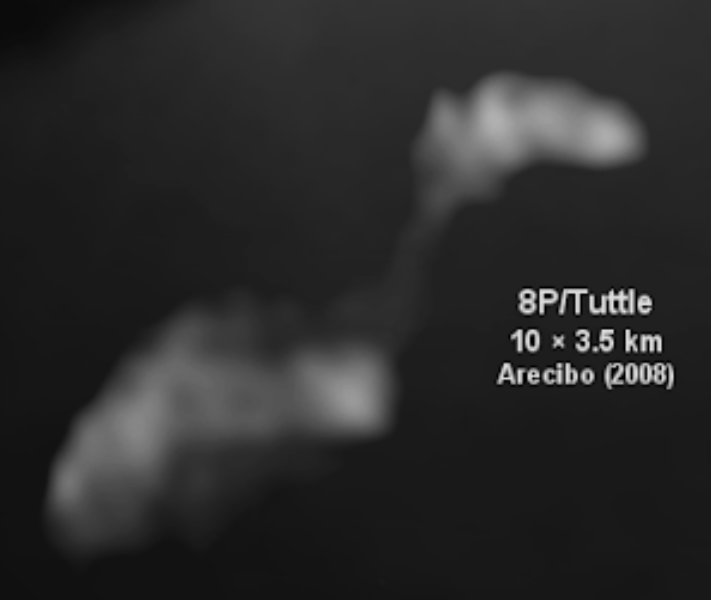
Radar image of the nucleus of 8P/Tuttle as seen from Arecibo in 2008

== Notes ==
Numbered comets
Previous; 7P/Pons–Winnecke	8P/Tuttle	Next; 9P/Tempel
