= Ľubor Kresák =

Slovak astronomer (1927–1994)

Ľubor Kresák (23 August 1927 in Topoľčany – 20 January 1994 in Bratislava) was a Slovak astronomer.

He discovered two comets: the periodic comet 41P/Tuttle-Giacobini-Kresak and the non-periodic C/1954 M2 (Kresak-Peltier). He also suggested in 1978 that the Tunguska event was a fragment of the periodic comet Encke.

The asteroid 1849 Kresák was named in his honor.

His wife Margita Kresáková was also an astronomer.
