= Horace Parnell Tuttle =

American astronomer (1837–1923)

Horace Parnell Tuttle (March 17, 1837 – August 16, 1923) was an American astronomer, an American Civil War veteran and brother of astronomer Charles Wesley Tuttle (November 1, 1829 – July 17, 1881).

== Biography ==
=== Early life ===
H. P. Tuttle was born at Newfield, Maine. His parents were Moses Tuttle and Mary Merrow. In 1845 Mary Merrow died, and four years later Moses Tuttle remarried and moved to Cambridge, Massachusetts. Charles Wesley Tuttle was an amateur astronomer who constructed his own telescope, and on a visit to the Harvard Observatory so impressed William Cranch Bond that by 1850 he was hired as an assistant observer. At Harvard Charles Wesley first proposed the existence of the interior "dusky ring" of Saturn. In 1853 he discovered a comet (C/1853 E1 Secchi), with independent discovery credited to Father Secchi, Rome. The following year Charles Wesley was forced to give up his astronomical career because of failing eyesight. He entered Harvard Law School and became U. S. Commissioner. Charles wrote many articles for the New England Historic Genealogy Society.

Charles was soon replaced at Harvard by his younger brother Horace, who joined Truman Henry Safford, Sidney Coolidge, and Asaph Hall as observatory assistants. Horace became attached to a four-inch Merz comet seeker, which he placed on the balconies of the 15-inch refractor, spending many nights in search of new comets.

Horace Tuttle discovered or co-discovered numerous comets, including 55P/Tempel-Tuttle (parent body of the Leonid meteor shower, discovered by Tuttle January 6, 1866), and 109P/Swift-Tuttle (parent body of the Perseid meteor shower, disc. July 19, 1862), the "Great Comet of 1860", C/1860 III (disc. June 22, 1860), C/1859 G1 Tempel (disc April 24, 1859). Other periodic comets that bear his name are 8P/Tuttle (parent comet of the Ursid meteor shower; disc. January 5, 1858 "rather faint") and 41P/Tuttle-Giacobini-Kresak (disc. May 3, 1858 in Leo Minor "very faint"), C/1861 Y1 Tuttle, (disc. December 19, 1862), C/1859 G1 Tempel (disc. April 28, 1859). The asteroid 5036 Tuttle was named in his honor. In 1859 he was awarded the Lalande Prize of the French Academy of Sciences for the discovery of comets 1858I, 1858III, and 1858VII.

Tuttle is credited with the discovery of galaxies NGC 2655 in Camelopardalis, and NGC 6643 in Draco.

He dabbled in applications of the new Morse Code, and invented a method of signaling long distances by "light flashes". He is credited with inventing a new method for the insertion of rifled steel cores into brass or iron cannon.

His observing log books from this period are preserved at the library of the U.S. Naval Observatory.

=== War service ===
With the outbreak of the American Civil War, Horace Tuttle enlisted in the 44th Massachusetts Volunteer Infantry and served at New Bern, North Carolina. It would be through the intervention of former Harvard president Edward Everett that Tuttle was given a commission in the U. S. Navy and as paymaster. He served on a number of vessels, including the monitor USS Catskill, where he participated in the blockade of Charleston Harbor and the capture of the blockade runner Deer. Tuttle was appointed acting assistant paymaster, February 17, 1863, assistant paymaster, July 2, 1864, and paymaster, May 4, 1866.

He continued to make astronomical observations during the war, reporting on the 1864 appearance of C/1864 N1 (Tempel) from the deck of the Catskill. After the war Tuttle was sent to South America, Europe, and the Pacific, making scientific observations on Naval survey vessels.

=== Later life ===
The war era had taken Tuttle out of cometseeking for three and a half years. His discovery of comet 1866 I at the Naval Observatory on January 5, 1866, must have brought him back to happier times. This was Comet Tempel-Tuttle, first seen by the French astronomer more than two weeks earlier. The Washington Star newspaper reported the event on page two:

This was only the second comet ever discovered at the Naval Observatory. The first was James Ferguson's independent discovery of Comet Tempel 1859, which was also an independent discovery of H. P. Tuttle. In October, 1866 he was assigned to the Onward, South Atlantic Station. During the next four years he served on the monitors Guard and Terror.

On October 23, 1871, Tuttle independently recovered periodic comet 8/P1871 T1 Tuttle at the U.S. Naval Observatory in Washington, D.C. In 1871 Tuttle served under Commodore George Dewey as astronomer on the survey of the coast of lower California. In 1872 he was assigned to the oceanographic survey ship Lackawanna at Hong Kong. On January 26, 1875, Tuttle and E. S. Holden recovered periodic comet 2P/Encke from the Naval Observatory. Tuttle was in Washington, DC attending a Naval court martial, his own in fact. He was dismissed from the Navy March 3, 1875.

Tuttle's brother Francis served in the Navy as Mate and Acting Ensign from 1863 to 1870. As Captain of the US Revenue Cutter Bear, Francis Tuttle was ordered to the rescue of 14 ships of whalers trapped in ice off Point Barrow, Alaska, in 1897.

In 1875 Tuttle was appointed to the Interior Department's geographic and geological survey of the Black Hills of Dakota to survey the state borders and measure heights of geological features. He spent the next five years on border surveys of Dakota, Wyoming, Colorado and Utah, for the General Land Office.

In 1887 Tuttle had a 6.5-inch broken-back reflecting comet seeker made for him by John Brashear. It was installed "on the tin roof of the Naval Observatory." A similar refractor cometseeker by Brashear is in the Naval Observatory collection. Here he made his last comet discovery, a recovery of Comet 1888V Barnard.

Tuttle lived in the Washington, D.C., area from about 1884 until his death from "pulmonary edema" in 1923. In his final years he was feeble and blind from a fall in November, 1921. His gravesite is unmarked, and its location in Oakwood Cemetery, Falls Church, is unknown.

Comets discovered/recovered
C/1857II Bruhns	April 1857
C/1857 Q1 (Klinkerfues) (1857 V)	August 23. 1857
C/1857 V1 (Donati-van Arsdale) (1857 VI)	November 11, 1857
8P/Tuttle	January 5, 1858
41P/Tuttle-Giacobini-Kresak	May 2, 1858
C/1858 R1 (Tuttle) (1858 VII)	September 5, 1858
C/1859 G1 (Tempel)	April 24, 1859
C/1860 M1 (1860 III)	June 22, 1860
C/1861 III	December 18, 1861
109P/Swift-Tuttle	July 19, 1862
C/1861 Y1 (Tuttle)	December 19, 1862
55P/Tempel-Tuttle	January 5, 1866
8P/Tuttle	October 23, 1871
2P/Encke	January 26, 1875
C/1888 U1 (Barnard) (1888 V)	November 1, 1888

Asteroids discovered: 2
66 Maja	April 9, 1861
73 Klytia	April 7, 1862

== Gallery ==
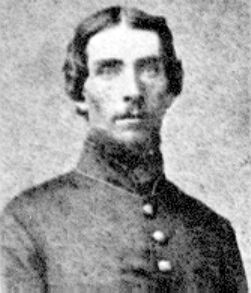
H. P. Tuttle, c. 1862

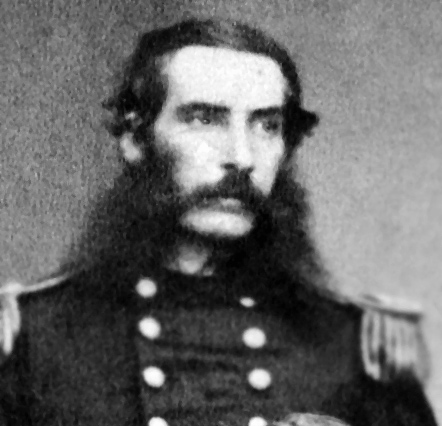
H. P. Tuttle, c. 1866

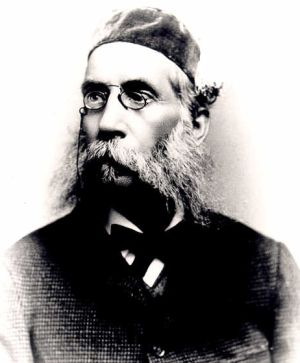
H. P. Tuttle, 1888 (USNO)
