= 73 Klytia =

Main-belt asteroid

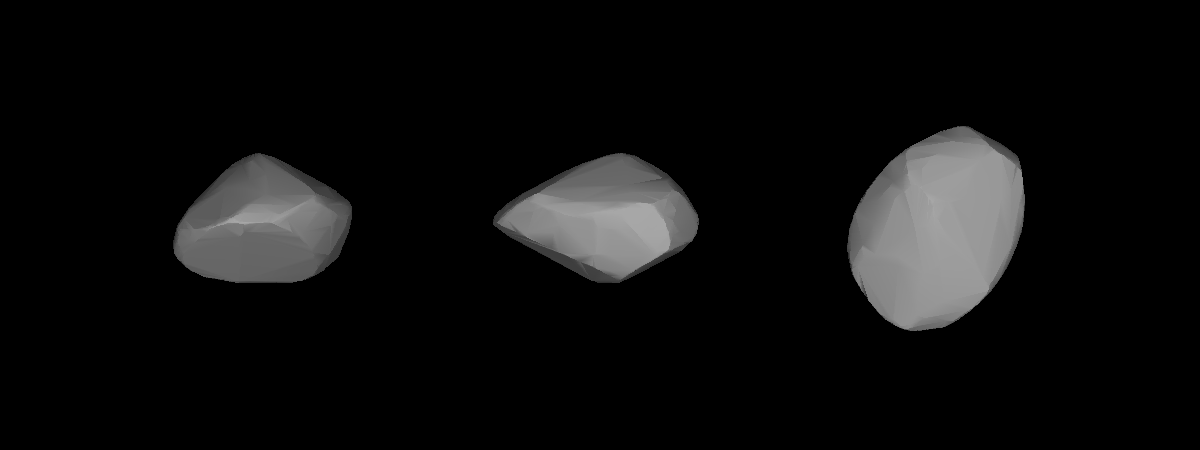
- Lightcurve-based 3D-model of Klytia

Discovery
- Discovered by: Horace Parnell Tuttle
- Discovery date: 7 April 1862

Designations
- Pronunciation: /ˈklɪʃiə/
- Named after: Κλυτία Klytiā
- Minor planet category: Main belt
- Adjectives: Klytian

Orbital characteristics
- Epoch 9 June 2026 (JD 2461200.5)
- Uncertainty parameter 0
- Aphelion: 2.7781 AU
- Perihelion: 2.5512 AU
- Semi-major axis: 2.6646 AU
- Eccentricity: 0.04257
- Orbital period (sidereal): 1588.74 d (4.3497 a)
- Mean anomaly: 21.3421°
- Inclination: 2.3695°
- Longitude of ascending node: 6.8216°
- Argument of perihelion: 56.8947°
- T_{Jupiter}: 3.381

Physical characteristics
- Dimensions: 44.4 km
- Synodic rotation period: 8.283065 h
- Geometric albedo: 0.225
- Spectral type: S
- Absolute magnitude (H): 8.9

73 Klytia is a main-belt asteroid. It was the second and last asteroid discovery by the prolific comet discoverer Horace Tuttle, on 7 April 1862. It is named after Clytia, who loved Helios in Greek mythology. Of the first one hundred numbered asteroids, Klytia is the smallest.

Based upon photometry observations between 1984 and 2007, it has a sidereal rotation period of 8.283065 h with an amplitude that can range up to 0.34±0.01 in magnitude. The lightcurve shows some shape irregularities. There are two valid solutions for the pole's ecliptic coordinates: (λ_{1}, β_{1}) = (38°, +75°) and (λ_{2}, β_{2}) = (237°, +73°).
