= Michel Giacobini =

French astronomer (1873–1938)

Michel Giacobini (1873–1938) was a French astronomer.

He discovered a number of comets, including 21P/Giacobini-Zinner (parent body of the Giacobinids meteor shower), 41P/Tuttle-Giacobini-Kresak, and 205P/Giacobini. The latter he had discovered at Nice on 4 September 1896, but it was not seen on its return, a little less than 7 years later, and was considered a lost comet and consequently designated D/1896 R2. On 10 September 2008, amateur supernova hunters Kōichi Itagaki and Hiroshi Kaneda rediscovered it, on its seventeenth return.

He won the Lalande Prize in 1900 and worked at the Nice Observatory until 1910, when he requested a transfer to the Paris Observatory. He was awarded the Valz Prize by the French Academy of Sciences in both 1905 and 1908.

In 1903, Giacobinin received the Prix Jules Janssen, the highest award of the Société astronomique de France, the French astronomical society.

He volunteered for military service in World War I and suffered the effects of poison gas. He recovered and resumed his astronomical activities after the war.
