= 205P/Giacobini =

Periodic comet

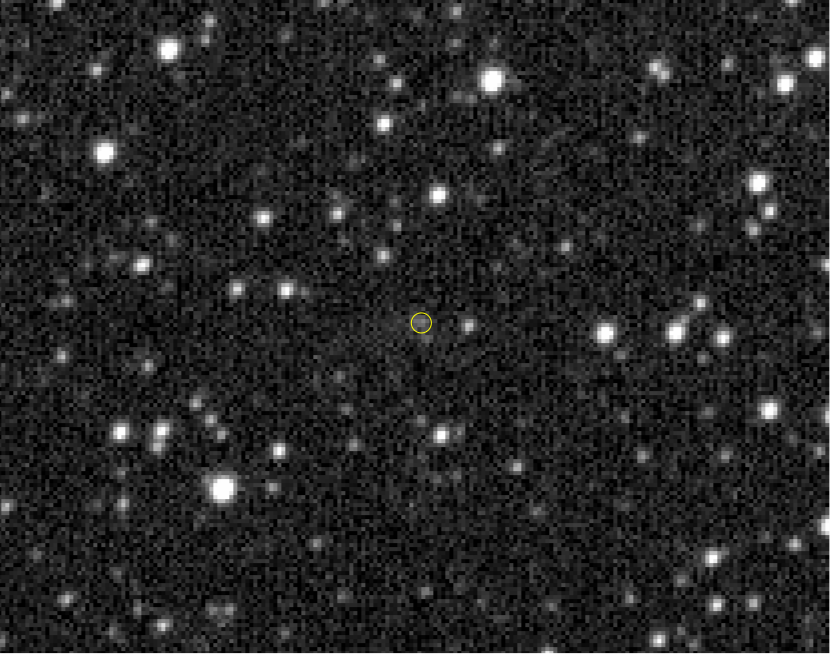
- Comet 205P/Giacobini photographed from the Zwicky Transient Facility on 25 October 2021

Discovery
- Discovered by: Michel Giacobini
- Discovery site: Nice, France
- Discovery date: 4 September 1896

Designations
- MPC designation: D/1896 R2, P/2008 R6
- Alternative designations: 1896 V, 1896d

Orbital characteristics
- Epoch: 19 February 2014 (JD 2456707.5)
- Observation arc: 112.05 years
- Number of observations: 1,143
- Aphelion: 5.558 AU
- Perihelion: 1.536 AU
- Semi-major axis: 3.547 AU
- Eccentricity: 0.5669
- Orbital period: 6.681 years
- Inclination: 15.287°
- Longitude of ascending node: 179.625°
- Argument of periapsis: 154.257°
- Last perihelion: 13 January 2022
- Next perihelion: 12 September 2028
- T_{Jupiter}: 2.779
- Earth MOID: 0.543 AU
- Jupiter MOID: 0.373 AU

Physical characteristics
- Comet total magnitude (M1): 12.0–18.5
- Comet nuclear magnitude (M2): 15.7
- Apparent magnitude: 11.3 (1896 apparition)

205P/Giacobini is a Jupiter-family comet with an orbital period of 6.68 years. It was discovered by Michel Giacobini on 4 September 1896 and then it was lost until it was recovered by Kōichi Itagaki on 10 September 2008. The comet was then found to have fragmented into three pieces.

== Observational history ==
The comet was discovered by Michel Giacobini on 4 September 1896. He described the comet as faint and with a coma about one arcminute across. Other observers confirmed the presence of the comet the next day, and estimated it to have an apparent magnitude of 11.3. The comet was then located in Serpens. The comet subsequently grew fainter and it was last observed on 5 January 1897 by William Hussey. The first elliptical orbit was calculated by Perrotin and Giacobini and indicated an orbital period of 6.65 years and perihelion date on October 28.80.

Starting from 26 September, Henri Perrotin observed an extremely faint companion, indicating that the comet had split. Other observers recorded a second condensation within the comet's coma in late September and early October using the Lick Observatory and an elongated nucleus on 10 October. Zdenek Sekanina estimated the fragment separated from the main nucleus on 24 April 1896, indicating a short-lived companion.

The comet was lost until Kōichi Itagaki and Hiroshi Kaneda rediscovered it on 10 September 2008 during their patrol survey for supernovae. The comet then had an apparent magnitude of 13.5, a coma about 25 arcseconds across and a tail about 2 arcminutes long. The comet was initially linked with the comet 1896V by Maik Meyer and the link was confirmed by Nakano. A companion about 4 magnitudes fainter than the primary (nucleus B) was observed on 17 September and one more than 5 magnitudes fainter (nucleus C) was observed on 19 September, further away. Zdenek Sekanina estimated that nucleus B separated in 2006, about 700 days before perihelion, while nucleus C had separated in 1998, before the comet's previous perihelion. The two fragments weren't observed in the 2015 perihelion.

During the next perihelion a secondary nucleus was observed drifting away from the primary, starting 15 October 2021. It is unclear if the secondary is a new fragmentation event or the reactivation of a previously observed fragment.

Numbered comets
Previous; 204P/LINEAR–NEAT	205P/Giacobini	Next; 206P/Barnard–Boattini
