= Draconids =

Northern Hemisphere meteor shower

Draconids (DRA)
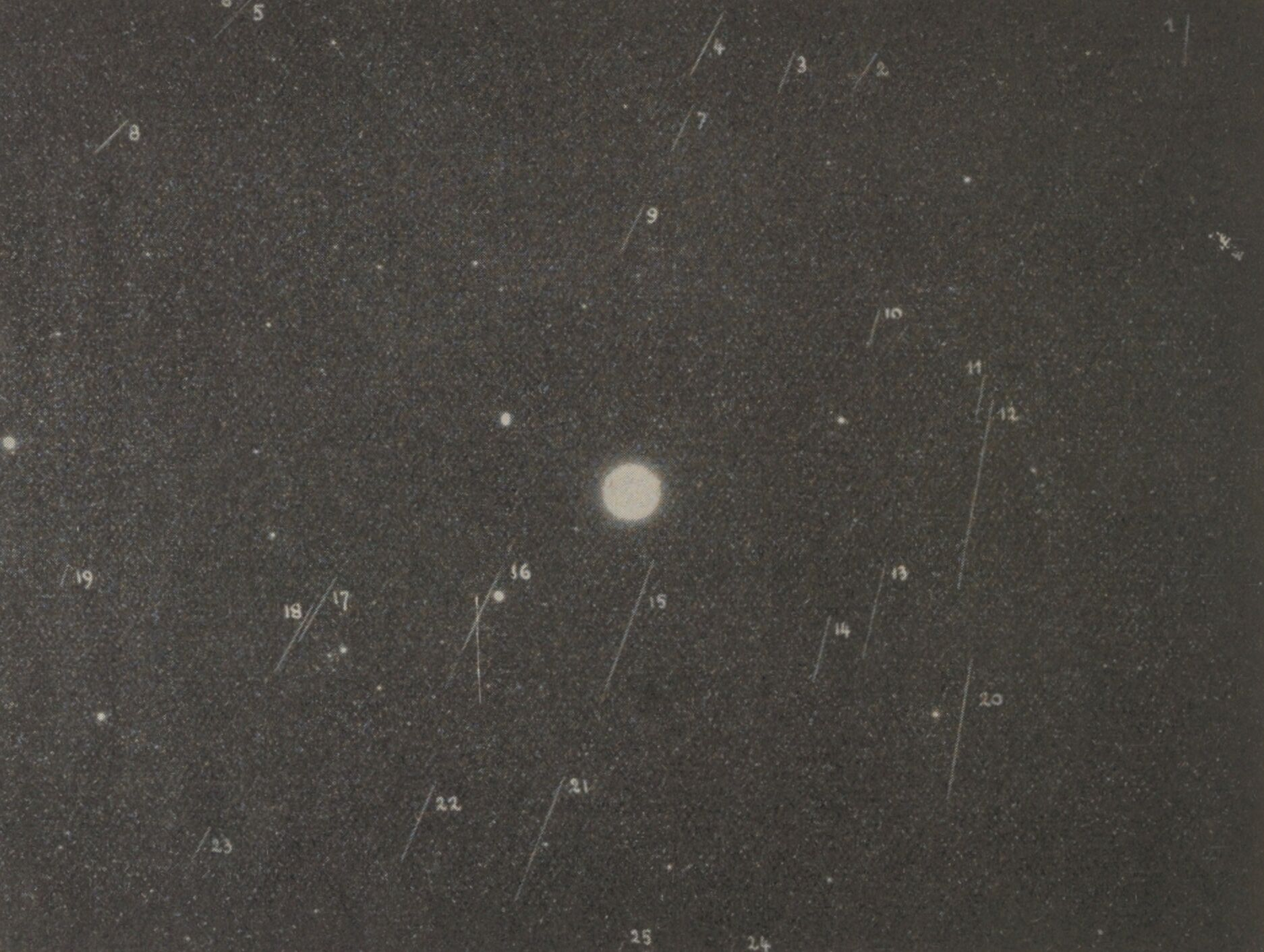
- The 1933 Draconids storm
- Pronunciation: /drəˈkoʊnɪdz/
- Parent body: 21P/Giacobini-Zinner

Radiant
- Constellation: Draco (constellation)
- Right ascension: 17.467^{h}
- Declination: +54°

Properties
- Occurs during: October 6 – October 10
- Date of peak: October 8
- Velocity: 20 km/s
- Zenithal hourly rate: variable

The October Draconids, in the past also unofficially known as the Giacobinids, are a Northern Hemisphere meteor shower whose parent body is the periodic comet 21P/Giacobini-Zinner. They are named after the constellation Draco, where they seemingly come from. Almost all meteors which fall towards Earth ablate long before reaching its surface. The Draconids are best viewed after sunset in an area with a clear dark sky.

The 1933 and 1946 Draconids had zenithal hourly rates of thousands of meteors visible per hour, among the most impressive meteor storms of the 20th century. Rare outbursts in activity can occur when the Earth travels through a denser part of the cometary debris stream; for example, in 1998, rates suddenly spiked but only increased modestly in 2005. A Draconid meteor outburst occurred as expected on October 8, 2011, though a waxing gibbous Moon reduced the number of meteors observed visually. During the 2012 shower, radar observations (which detect smaller and fainter meteors) detected up to 1,000 meteors per hour. The 2012 outburst may have been caused by the narrow trail of dust and debris left behind by the parent comet in 1959. A brief Draconids outburst was expected on October 8, 2025, which was projected to last for a few hours, with a ZHR up to approximately 400. A Draconids meteor storm is possible in October 2098, with hourly rates potentially reaching 20,000 meteors per hour.

Draconid Outbursts
Date	Stream	ZHR
1933-Oct-09	1900	6000
1946-Oct-09	1900	3000
1952-Oct-09		174 (radar)
1985-Oct-08		250
1998-Oct-08		720
2005-Oct-08	1946	150 (radar) / 40 (visual)
2011-Oct-08	1900	300
2012-Oct-08	1959	1000 (radar)
2018-Oct-08	1952	150
