= 41P/Tuttle–Giacobini–Kresák =

Jupiter-family comet

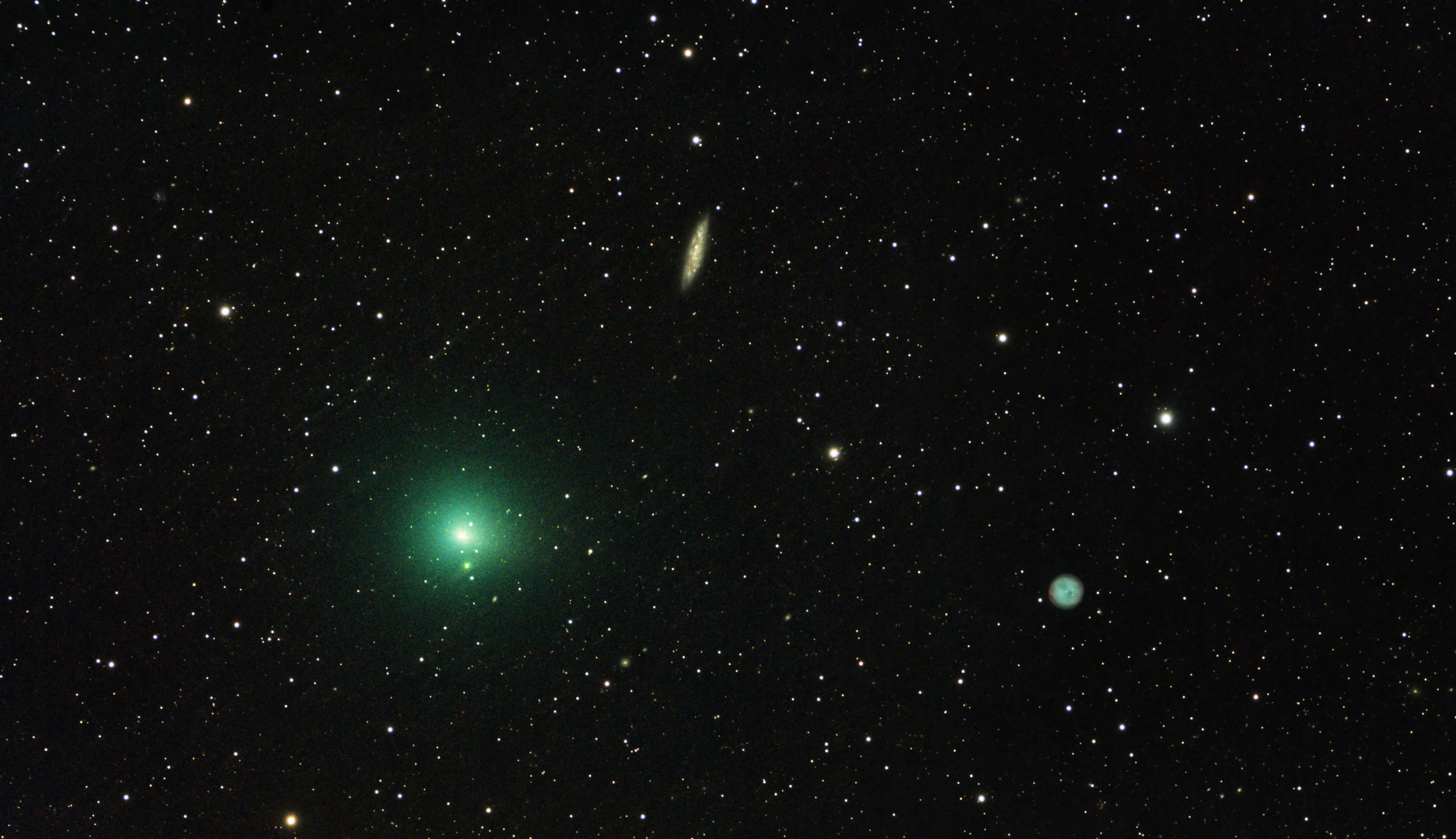
- Comet Tuttle–Giacobini–Kresák on March 3, 2017 near Messier 108 and the Owl Nebula.

Discovery
- Discovered by: Horace Parnell Tuttle; Michel Giacobini; Ľubor Kresák
- Discovery date: May 3, 1858

Designations
- MPC designation: P/1858 J1, P/1907 O1; P/1951 H1
- Alternative designations: 1858 III, 1907 III, 1951 IV; 1962 V, 1973 VI; 1978 XXV, 1990 II

Orbital characteristics
- Epoch: September 13, 2023 (JD 2460200.5)
- Observation arc: 72.38 years
- Earliest precovery date: April 26, 1951
- Number of observations: 5,250
- Aphelion: 5.126 AU
- Perihelion: 1.051 AU
- Semi-major axis: 3.088 AU
- Eccentricity: 0.65981
- Orbital period: 5.428 years
- Inclination: 9.219°
- Longitude of ascending node: 140.99°
- Argument of periapsis: 62.227°
- Mean anomaly: 66.147°
- Last perihelion: 12 September 2022
- Next perihelion: 15 February 2028
- T_{Jupiter}: 2.827
- Earth MOID: 0.134 AU
- Jupiter MOID: 0.488 AU

Physical characteristics
- Mean radius: 0.44–0.56 km (0.27–0.35 mi)
- Comet total magnitude (M1): 16.9

41P/Tuttle–Giacobini–Kresák is a Jupiter-family comet with a 5.43-year orbit around the Sun. Observations with the Hubble Space Telescope and dynamical modeling estimate an effective nucleus radius of 440–560 m (1,440–1,840 ft), corresponding to a diameter of roughly 0.88–1.12 km (0.55–0.70 mi), smaller than earlier ground-based estimates.

By January 2028, the comet should be around apparent magnitude 13. At the perihelion passage on 15 February 2028 the solar elongation will be 65 degrees at a magnitude of approximately 11. The comet should be observable with small telescopes.

== Observational history ==
=== Discovery ===
Discovered by Horace Parnell Tuttle on May 3, 1858, and re-discovered independently by Michel Giacobini and Ľubor Kresák in 1907 and 1951 respectively, it is a member of the Jupiter family of comets.

=== 1973 double outburst ===
This comet is of interest as it has been noted to outburst dramatically. In May+July 1973, the comet had two different outbursts from magnitude 14 to an easy naked-eye visibility at apparent magnitude 4.

=== 2006 apparition ===
As of June 1, 2006, Comet 41P was a 10th magnitude object for telescopes, located on the Cancer-Leo border, with a predicted maximum of about 10 at perihelion on June 11. However, by June 22, the comet had diminished to about magnitude 11, having produced no flare of note.

=== 2011 apparition ===
The comet was not observed during the 2011 unfavorable apparition since the perihelion passage occurred when the comet was on the far side of the Sun.

=== 2017 apparition ===
41P was recovered on November 10, 2016, at apparent magnitude 21 by Pan-STARRS. On April 1, 2017, the comet passed 0.142 AU (21.2 million km; 13.2 million mi) from the Earth. The comet was expected to brighten to around magnitude 7 and be visible in binoculars.

Observations during the apparition revealed rapid changes in the nucleus rotation rate, interpreted as being caused by strong outgassing torques near perihelion.

== Physical characteristics ==
High-resolution observations with the Hubble Space Telescope indicate that the nucleus of 41P has an effective radius between 440 and 560 m, based on photometry corrected for coma contamination and estimates from non-gravitational acceleration.

Photometric observations show a lightcurve amplitude of about 0.4 magnitudes, implying an elongated nucleus with an axis ratio of at least 1.4:1. Period analysis gives a likely double-peaked rotation period of 0.599 days (14.4 hours). The comet exhibited rapid rotational deceleration near perihelion in 2017, attributed to asymmetric outgassing torques.

Modeling suggests that continued torques could lead to rotational instability on timescales of decades, potentially much shorter than the comet’s dynamical lifetime (~1,000 years). The nucleus may therefore be susceptible to rotational breakup.

== Proposed exploration ==
In the 1960s, the European Space Research Organisation (ESRO) investigated about sending a probe to the comet by 1973, however this proposal was later rejected.

Numbered comets
Previous; 40P/Väisälä	41P/Tuttle–Giacobini–Kresák	Next; 42P/Neujmin
