= 21P/Giacobini–Zinner =

Jupiter-family comet

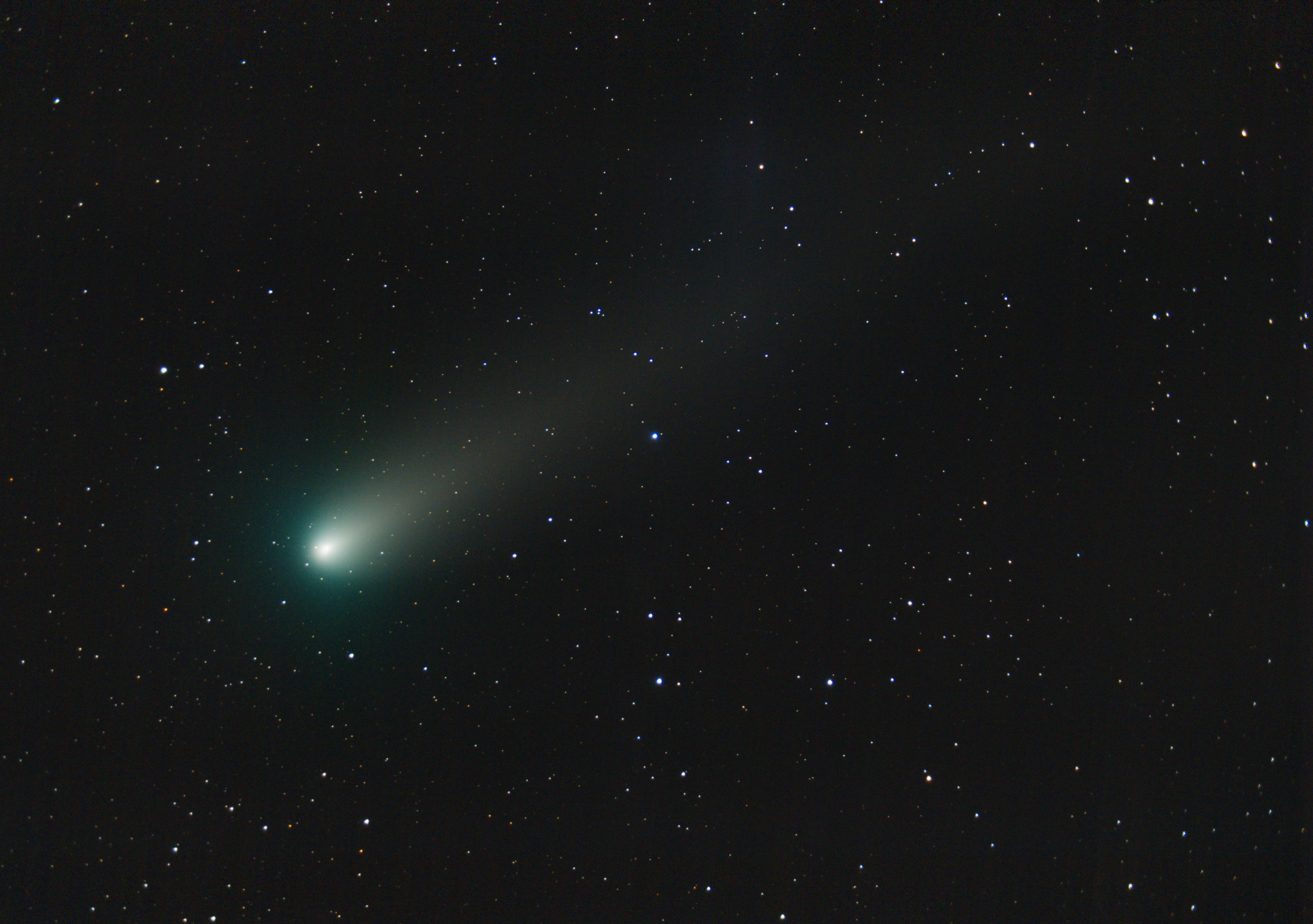
- Comet Giacobini–Zinner photographed from Moscow, Russia on 9 September 2018.

Discovery
- Discovered by: Michel Giacobini; Ernst Zinner
- Discovery date: 20 December 1900; 23 October 1913

Designations
- MPC designation: P/1900 Y1, P/1913 U1
- Pronunciation: /ˌdʒækoʊˈbiːniˈzɪnər/
- Alternative designations: 1900 III, 1913 V, 1926 VI; 1933 III, 1940 I, 1946 V; 1959 VIII, 1966 I, 1972 VI; 1979 III, 1985 XIII; 1992 IX

Orbital characteristics
- Epoch: 26 March 2025 (JD 2460760.5)
- Observation arc: 123.84 years (Note: Observation arc from the Minor Planet Center database only covered dates from 24 December 1900 until 21 October 2024 (123.83 years). This figure includes its entire arc up to 20 December 1900.)
- Number of observations: 7,423
- Aphelion: 5.97 AU
- Perihelion: 1.009 AU
- Semi-major axis: 3.49 AU
- Eccentricity: 0.7111
- Orbital period: 6.525 years
- Inclination: 32.05°
- Longitude of ascending node: 195.3°
- Argument of periapsis: 172.9°
- Last perihelion: 25 March 2025
- Next perihelion: 30 August 2031
- T_{Jupiter}: 2.465
- Earth MOID: 0.018 AU
- Jupiter MOID: 0.248 AU

Physical characteristics
- Dimensions: 2.0 km (1.2 mi)
- Mean density: 640±100 kg/m^{3}
- Synodic rotation period: 7.39±0.01 hours
- Geometric albedo: 0.044
- Comet total magnitude (M1): 13.2

Perihelion distance at different epochs
| Epoch | Perihelion (AU) |
| 1894 | 1.23 |
| 1900 | 0.93 |
| 1985 | 1.03 |
| 2031 | 1.07 |
| 2078 | 0.97 |

Comet Giacobini–Zinner (officially designated as 21P/Giacobini–Zinner) is a Jupiter-family comet with a 6.53-year orbit around the Sun. It was discovered by Michel Giacobini, who observed it in the constellation of Aquarius on 20 December 1900. It was recovered two orbits later by Ernst Zinner, while he was observing variable stars near Beta Scuti on 23 October 1913.

It will pass 0.364 AU (54.5 million km) from Jupiter on 14 February 2029, then come to perihelion on 30 August 2031 at 1.07 AU from the Sun, and then pass 0.554 AU (82.9 million km) from Earth on 3 September 2031.

== Physical properties ==
The comet nucleus is estimated to be 2.0 km (1.2 mi) in diameter. During its apparitions, Giacobini–Zinner can reach about the 7-8th magnitude, but in 1946 it underwent a series of outbursts that made it as bright as 5th magnitude. It is the parent body of the Giacobinids meteor shower (also known as the Draconids). The comet currently has a minimum orbit intersection distance to Earth of 0.035 AU (5.2 million km).

During the apparition of 2018, the optical spectra have revealed the comet is depleted in carbon-chain molecules and carbon dioxide, likely indicating its origin in relatively warm portion of the Solar System.

== Exploration ==
Giacobini–Zinner was the target of the International Cometary Explorer spacecraft, which passed through its plasma tail at a distance of 7,800 km (4,800 mi) on 11 September 1985, becoming the first comet ever visited in space exploration. Earlier in the same month the comet was observed by the Pioneer Venus Orbiter. In addition, Japanese space officials considered redirecting the Sakigake interplanetary probe toward a 1998 encounter with Giacobini–Zinner, but that probe lacked the propellant for the necessary maneuvers and the project was abandoned.

== 2025 Perihelion ==
21P/Giacobini-Zinner most recently passed perihelion on 25 March 2025. Closest Earth approach was 4 days before, on 21 March on the opposite side of the Sun at an unfavorable distance of 2.0 AU. It brightened to magnitude ~11.

== Notes ==
Numbered comets
| Previous; 20D/Westphal | 21P/Giacobini–Zinner | Next; 22P/Kopff |
