= C/2025 D1 (Gröller) =

Parabolic comet

Discovery
- Discovered by: Hannes Gröller
- Discovery site: Kitt Peak, Arizona (Bok Telescope)
- Discovery date: 20 February 2025

Orbital characteristics
- Epoch: 24 June 2024 (JD 2460485.5)
- Observation arc: 6.90 years (2,522 days)
- Earliest precovery date: 6 June 2018
- Number of observations: 66
- Perihelion: 14.123 AU
- Eccentricity: 1.00302
- Orbital period: ~6 million years (inbound)
- Inclination: 84.491°
- Longitude of ascending node: 312.89°
- Argument of periapsis: 185.85°
- Mean anomaly: –0.004°
- Next perihelion: 18 May 2028
- Earth MOID: 13.143 AU
- Jupiter MOID: 8.826 AU

Physical characteristics
- Mean radius: ≥ 0.4 km (0.25 mi)
- Comet total magnitude (M1): 6.6

Comet Gröller, also known as C/2025 D1 (Gröller), is a very distant non-periodic comet discovered by Hannes Gröller of the Catalina Sky Survey on 20 February 2025. It is the comet with the most distant perihelion ever known, which will approach the Sun no closer than 14.12 AU (2.112 billion km) by May 2028, surpassing the record previously held by C/2003 A2 (Gleason) by 2.7 AU.

It was Hannes Gröller's fourth comet discovery since 2019. (Note: Hannes Gröller previously discovered the following three comets between 2019 and 2021. These were P/2019 B2, P/2019 V2, and P/2021 R6)

== Observational history ==
The comet was discovered by Hannes Gröller using the 2.25 m (7.4 ft) Bok Telescope of the Kitt Peak Observatory in Arizona. Images obtained through stacking of 30-second exposures show a magnitude 20.6 object with a condensed coma measuring 3 arcseconds across. Amateur astronomer Sam Deen found several precovery observations of C/2025 D1 from 2018, when the comet was more than 21 AU (3.1 billion km) from the Sun (beyond the orbit of Uranus). This makes C/2025 D1 one of the few known "ultradistant comets" that have been observed beyond 20 AU (3.0 billion km) from the Sun. The ultradistant comets, which include the giant Oort cloud comet C/2014 UN_{271} (Bernardinelli–Bernstein), are believed to contain supervolatile compounds such as carbon monoxide and carbon dioxide, which are known to easily vaporize at low temperatures far from the Sun.

== Orbit ==
Astrometric measurements and orbital calculations reveal that C/2025 D1 is a dynamically new comet from the Oort cloud, with its previous perihelion distance approximately 6 million years ago were estimated to be greater than or equal to 60 AU (9.0 billion km). It will reach its next perihelion on 18 May 2028, and is expected to be ejected from the Solar System on its outbound flight.

== See also ==
Other ultradistant comets:

- Comet Hale–Bopp
- C/2010 U3 (Boattini)
- C/2017 K2 (PanSTARRS)
- C/2014 UN_{271} (Bernardinelli–Bernstein)
- C/2019 E3 (ATLAS)
