= C/2014 UN271 (Bernardinelli–Bernstein) =

Largest known Oort cloud comet

C/2014 UN_{271} (Bernardinelli–Bernstein)
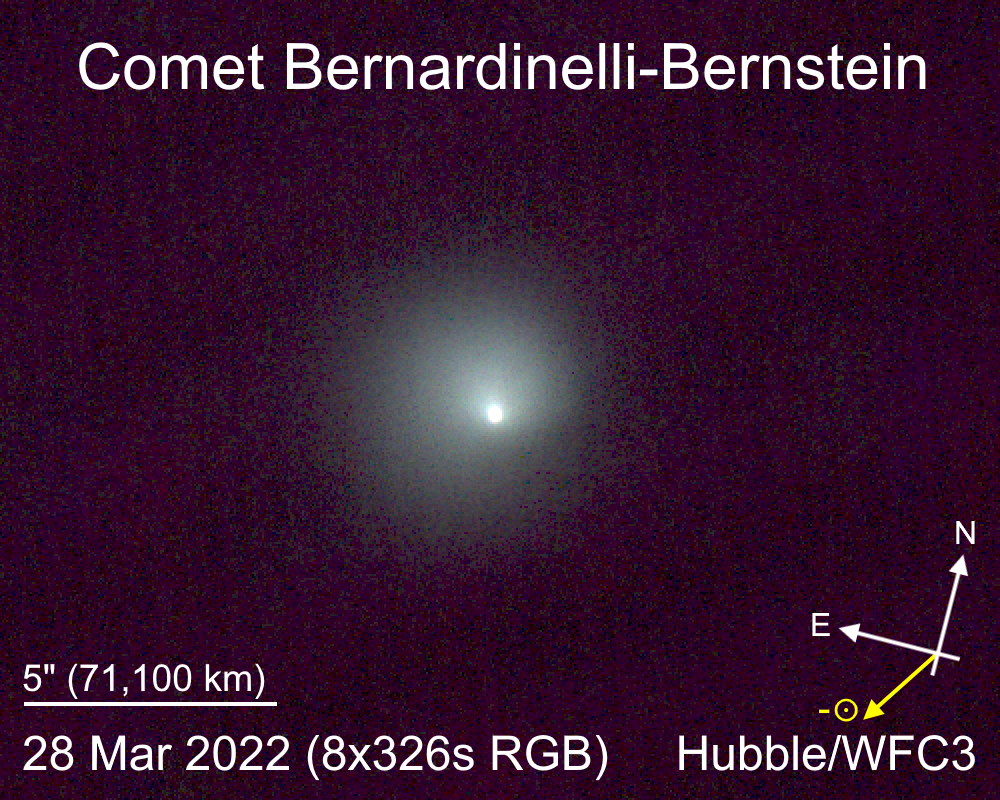
- Color composite image of C/2014 UN_{271} by the Hubble Space Telescope on 28 March 2022

Discovery
- Discovered by: Pedro Bernardinelli; Gary Bernstein; (Dark Energy Survey)
- Discovery date: 20 October 2014 (first discovery image)

Designations
- Alternative designations: 2014 UN_{271}; Comet Bernardinelli–Bernstein; "BB"

Orbital characteristics (barycentric)
- Epoch: 1 January 1600 (inbound) (Note: For epoch 1600-Jan-01 orbit period is "PR = 1.10E+09 / 365.25 days" = ~3.0 million years. In 1600 the comet was still 310 AU from the Sun and had not entered the planetary region of the Solar System.); 1 January 2500 (outbound) (Note: For epoch 2500-Jan-01 orbit period is "PR = 1.879E+09 / 365.25 days" = ~5.1 million years. In 2500 the comet will be 328 AU from the Sun and will have exited the planetary region of the Solar System.)
- Observation arc: 14.84 yr (5,419 days)
- Earliest precovery date: 15 November 2010
- Orbit type: Oort cloud
- Aphelion: ≈ 42,000 AU (inbound) ≈ 59,000 AU (outbound)
- Perihelion: 10.9502 AU (1.64 billion km) (Note: The 3-sigma uncertainty in the perihelion distance is ±20,000 km.)
- Semi-major axis: ≈ 21,000 AU (inbound) ≈ 30,000 AU (outbound)
- Eccentricity: 0.99947 (inbound); 0.99963 (outbound)
- Orbital period: ≈ 3.0 million yr (inbound) ≈ 5.1 million yr (outbound)
- Inclination: 95.466° (inbound); 95.460° (outbound)
- Longitude of ascending node: 190.003° (inbound); 190.009° (outbound)
- Argument of periapsis: 326.280° (inbound); 326.246° (outbound)
- Next perihelion: ≈ 22 January 2031 23:28 UT (Note: Perihelion passage: Since perihelion has not yet occurred and the orbit is highly eccentric, an epoch closer to 2031 will give a more accurate estimated perihelion date that better accounts for continuing planetary perturbations. The JPL SBDB's epoch 2021 unperturbed two-body solution (Sun+comet) gives a date of 2031-Jan-27. But properly integrating the orbit with JPL Horizons to perihelion passage accounts for all planetary perturbations and gives the last hour of 2031-Jan-22.)
- T_{Jupiter}: –0.390
- Jupiter MOID: 6.137 AU

Physical characteristics
- Dimensions: a/b = 1.26±0.11
- Mean diameter: 119±15 (Note: The uncertainty in C/2014 UN_{271}'s thermal emission-derived diameter largely comes from the unknown level of thermal contamination by cometary dust surrounding the nucleus. The lower-limit estimate 119±15 km assumes maximal dust contamination, whereas the upper-limit estimate 137±17 km assumes negligible dust contamination.) to 137±17 km
- Synodic rotation period: 20.6±0.2 d
- Geometric albedo: 0.033±0.009 to 0.044±0.012 (Note: As with the case of C/2014 UN_{271}'s thermal-derived diameter, the uncertainty in C/2014 UN_{271}'s visual (V-band) geometric albedo largely comes from the unknown level of thermal contamination by cometary dust surrounding the nucleus. The lower-limit albedo 0.033±0.009 is calculated from the upper-limit diameter assuming negligible dust contamination, whereas the upper-limit albedo 0.044±0.012 is calculated from the lower-limit diameter assuming maximal dust contamination.)
- Absolute magnitude (H): 8.63±0.11 (nucleus only)
- Comet total magnitude (M1): 6.2±0.9

C/2014 UN_{271} (Bernardinelli–Bernstein), simply known as C/2014 UN_{271} or Comet Bernardinelli–Bernstein, or just Bernardinelli–Bernstein (nicknamed BB), is a large Oort cloud comet discovered by astronomers Pedro Bernardinelli and Gary Bernstein in archival images from the Dark Energy Survey. When first imaged in October 2014, the object was 29 AU (4.3 billion km; 2.7 billion mi) from the Sun, almost as far as Neptune's orbit and the greatest distance at which a comet has been discovered. With a nucleus diameter of at least 100 km (62 mi), it is the largest Oort cloud comet known. It is approaching the Sun and will reach its perihelion of 10.9 AU (just outside of Saturn's orbit) around 22 January 2031 23:28 UT. It will not be visible to the naked eye because it will not enter the inner Solar System. (Note: Even though they have a large nucleus, comets such as C/2014 UN_{271} (137 km) at 11 AU, 95P/Chiron (215 km) at 8 AU, and C/2002 VQ_{94} (96 km) at 7 AU do not become visible to the naked eye because they stay outside of the inner Solar System. Comet Hale-Bopp (74 km) was visible to the naked eye as it passed within 1 AU of the Sun.)

== Observational history ==
=== Discovery ===
C/2014 UN_{271} was discovered by astronomers Pedro Bernardinelli and Gary Bernstein in an algorithm-assisted search for slowly-moving trans-Neptunian objects, in archival images from the Dark Energy Survey (DES) at Cerro Tololo Inter-American Observatory. It was detected at the 22nd apparent magnitude in 42 DES images spanning 10 October 2014 to 26 November 2018. The long observation arc by the DES images revealed that the object was on a near-parabolic trajectory inbound towards the Solar System, implying a cometary origin from the Oort cloud, despite the object's apparently asteroidal (point-like) appearance in the images. When first imaged by the DES, the object was located in the southern constellation Sculptor, inside the orbit of Neptune at a distance of 29.0 AU (4.3 billion km; 2.7 billion mi) from the Sun. The object's relatively high brightness from its distance indicated that its diameter must be on the order of 100 km (62 mi)—an exceptionally large size for an object of cometary origin.

The discovery was announced by the Minor Planet Center on 19 June 2021, and the object was given the minor planet provisional designation 2014 UN_{271}. (Note: The provisional designation of a minor planet indicates its discovery date and order. For 2014 UN_{271}, 2014 is when the first discovery image was taken, U is the discovery half-month (second half of October), and N_{271} is the discovery counter in that half-month.) The object attracted significant attention from astronomers worldwide: astronomers made follow-up observations and found several precoveries within days of the announcement. The earliest precovery observations of 2014 UN_{271} were obtained from Paranal Observatory's VISTA survey images taken on 15 November 2010, when the object was 34.1 AU (5.1 billion km; 3.2 billion mi) from the Sun.

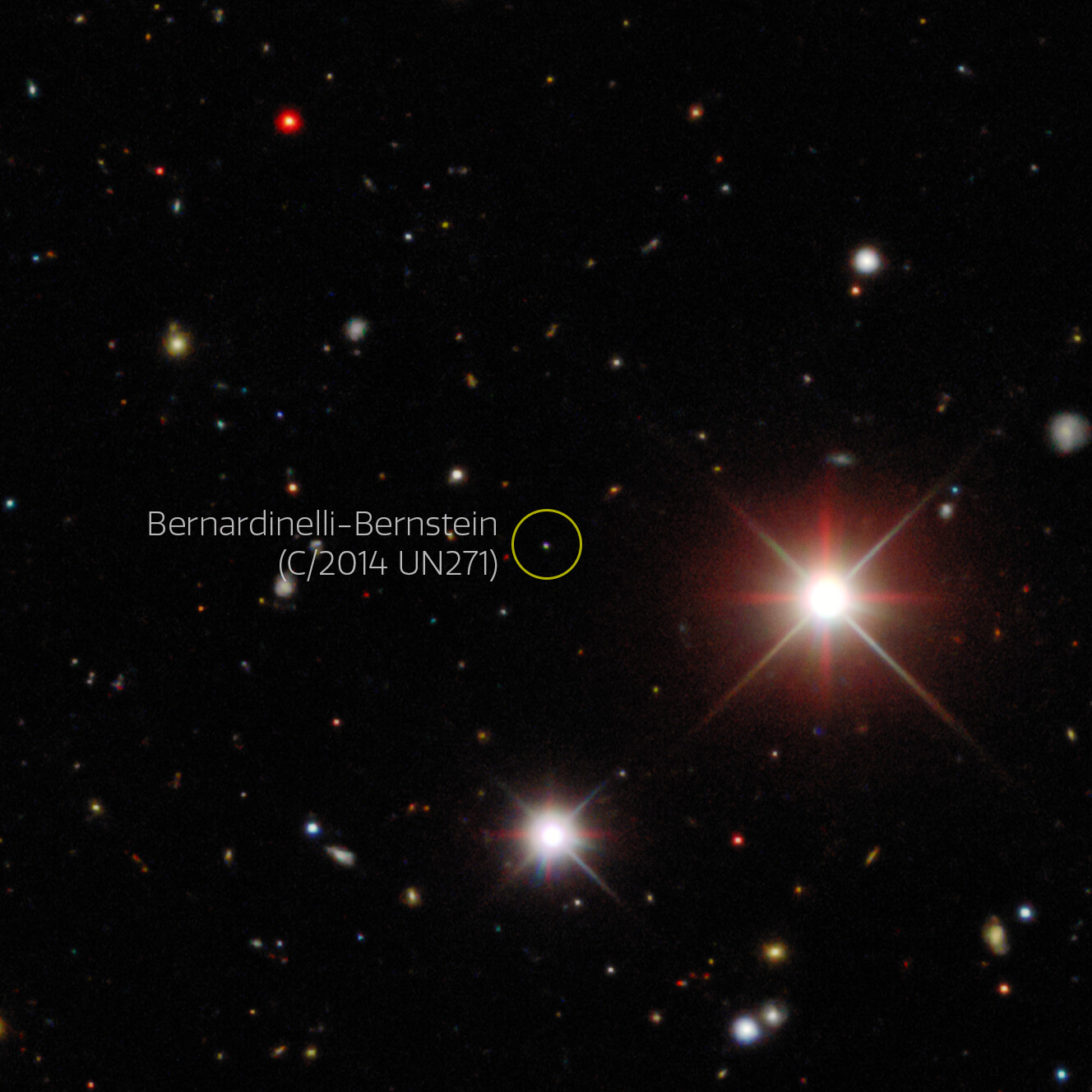
Color composite image of C/2014 UN_{271} from the Dark Energy Survey in October 2017

Comet Bernardinelli–Bernstein with a diffuse coma, imaged by Las Cumbres Observatory on 22 June 2021

=== Cometary activity ===
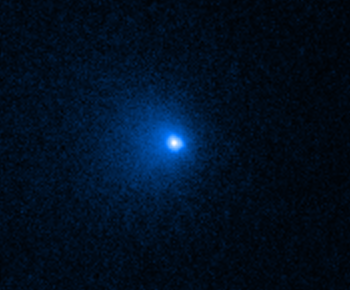
Comet Bernardinelli–Bernstein imaged by the Hubble Space Telescope on 8 January 2022

Cometary activity in 2014 UN_{271} was first reported on 22 June 2021, by Tim Lister at Las Cumbres Observatory's telescope in Sutherland, South Africa and by Luca Buzzi at the SkyGems Remote Telescope in Namibia. The comet was found to be one magnitude brighter than predicted in their observations, with a slightly asymmetric coma up to 15 arcseconds in width. At that time, the comet's distance from the Sun was 20.2 AU (3.0 billion km; 1.9 billion mi). The detection of cometary activity was confirmed by the Minor Planet Center and the comet was formally named C/2014 UN_{271} (Bernardinelli–Bernstein) on 24 June 2021. (Note: In official comet naming convention, the C/ prefix indicates a non-periodic orbit and the attached surnames credit the discoverers of the comet.)

Analysis of archival images from NASA's Transiting Exoplanet Survey Satellite (TESS) show that C/2014 UN_{271} had an extensive, diffuse coma at least 43 arcseconds wide in observations as early as September 2018, when it was 23.8 AU (3.6 billion km) from the Sun. Between the 2018 and 2020 TESS observation epochs, the comet's brightness had significantly increased by 1.5 magnitudes, likely as a result of continuous activity rather than a spontaneous outburst.

Reexamination of other telescope datasets have also identified a diffuse and distinctly asymmetric coma in DES images beginning from 2017 (at 25.1 AU) and Pan-STARRS 1 images beginning from 2019 (at 22.6 AU). C/2014 UN_{271}'s coma brightness has been growing exponentially since 2017, while the comet's overall brightness had remained steady in 2014–2018, hinting that activity may have well begun prior to the comet's discovery at 29.0 AU. The observation of cometary activity from such large heliocentric distances is rare: as of 2025 only five other comets, Comet Hale–Bopp (27.2 AU outbound), C/2010 U3 (Boattini) (25.8 AU inbound), C/2017 K2 (PanSTARRS) (24.0 AU inbound), C/2019 E3 (ATLAS) (23.0 AU inbound), and C/2025 D1 (Gröller) (~21 AU inbound) have been observed to exhibit activity at heliocentric distances greater than 20 AU. As of 2022, C/2014 UN_{271} holds the record for the greatest distance at which a comet has been discovered in the Solar System.

C/2014 UN_{271} was observed by the Hubble Space Telescope in January, March, July, August, and October 2022.

==== 2021 outburst ====
On 9 September 2021, an apparent outburst of C/2014 UN_{271} was detected at Las Cumbres Observatory, as reported on 14 September. It brightened by 0.65 magnitudes compared to images taken earlier that day, and reached an apparent magnitude of 18.9. Calculations based on this brightening indicate that 10 to 100 million kg (11 to 110 thousand short tons) of dust was ejected during the outburst. At the time, the comet was 19.9 AU (3.0 billion km; 1.8 billion mi) from the Sun. The comet's brightness subsequently faded back down to the 19th magnitude by December 2021.

=== Occultations ===
Rigorous computations of C/2014 UN_{271}'s orbit and ephemeris have identified few potential occultation events by the comet from 2021–2025, during which the comet would pass in front of a bright star and briefly block out the star's light. Observing these occultation events would allow for opportunities to make precise measurements of the comet's size and position, as well as search for surrounding dust and possible satellites. The first attempt at observing one of those occultations was made from Australia and New Zealand on 19 September 2021, but was unsuccessful due to poor weather conditions.

== Visibility ==
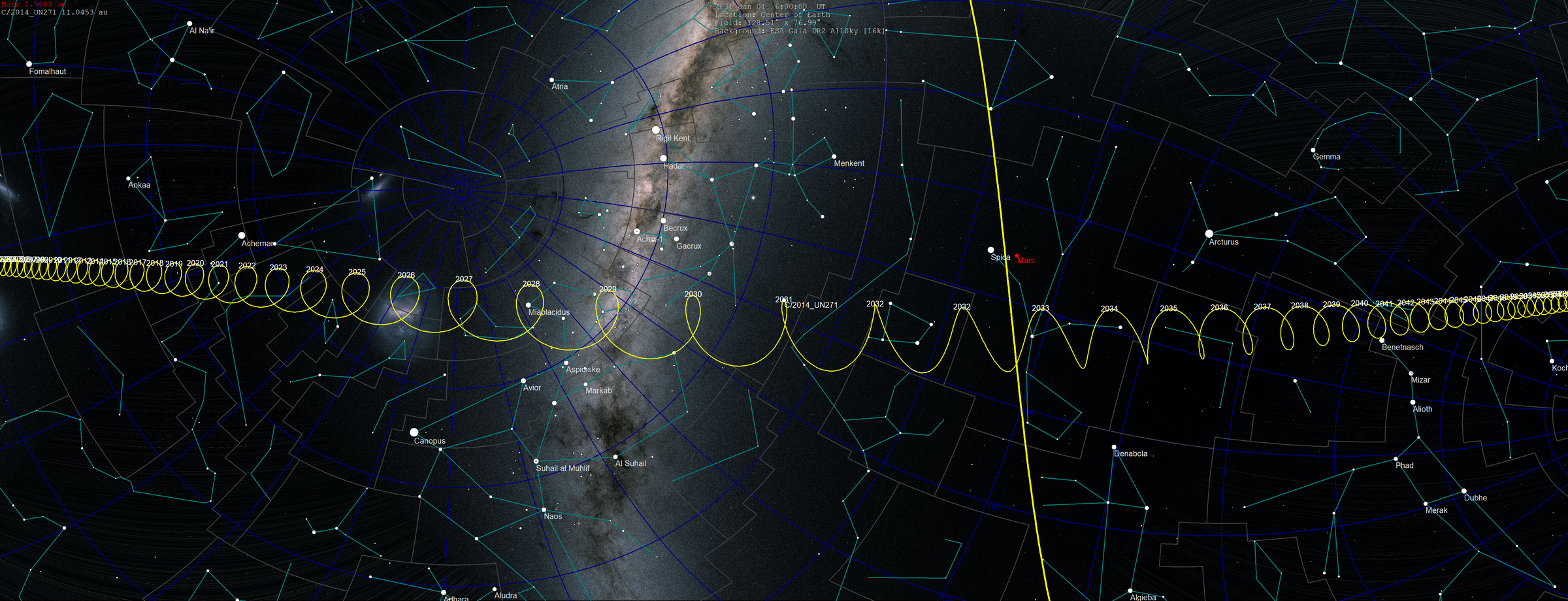
Sky path of C/2014 UN_{271} as seen from Earth. The comet is currently moving through the Southern hemisphere and will cross the celestial equator in 2034. The apparent loops in the comet's path are caused by the annual motion of the Earth around the Sun.

C/2014 UN_{271} has been in the Southern Hemisphere since 1941. It will reach a maximum southern declination of −76° in January 2027 and will not rise above the horizon at locations north of latitude 14° N. It will cross the celestial equator in 2034. Once at perihelion, the comet is not expected to get brighter than Pluto (mag 13–16) and is more likely to reach the brightness of Pluto's moon Charon (mag 16.8) as the comet does not enter the inner Solar System where comets become notably more active. Even if it reaches the magnitude of Pluto, it will require about a 200 mm telescope to be visually seen.

== Nucleus properties ==
=== Size and mass ===
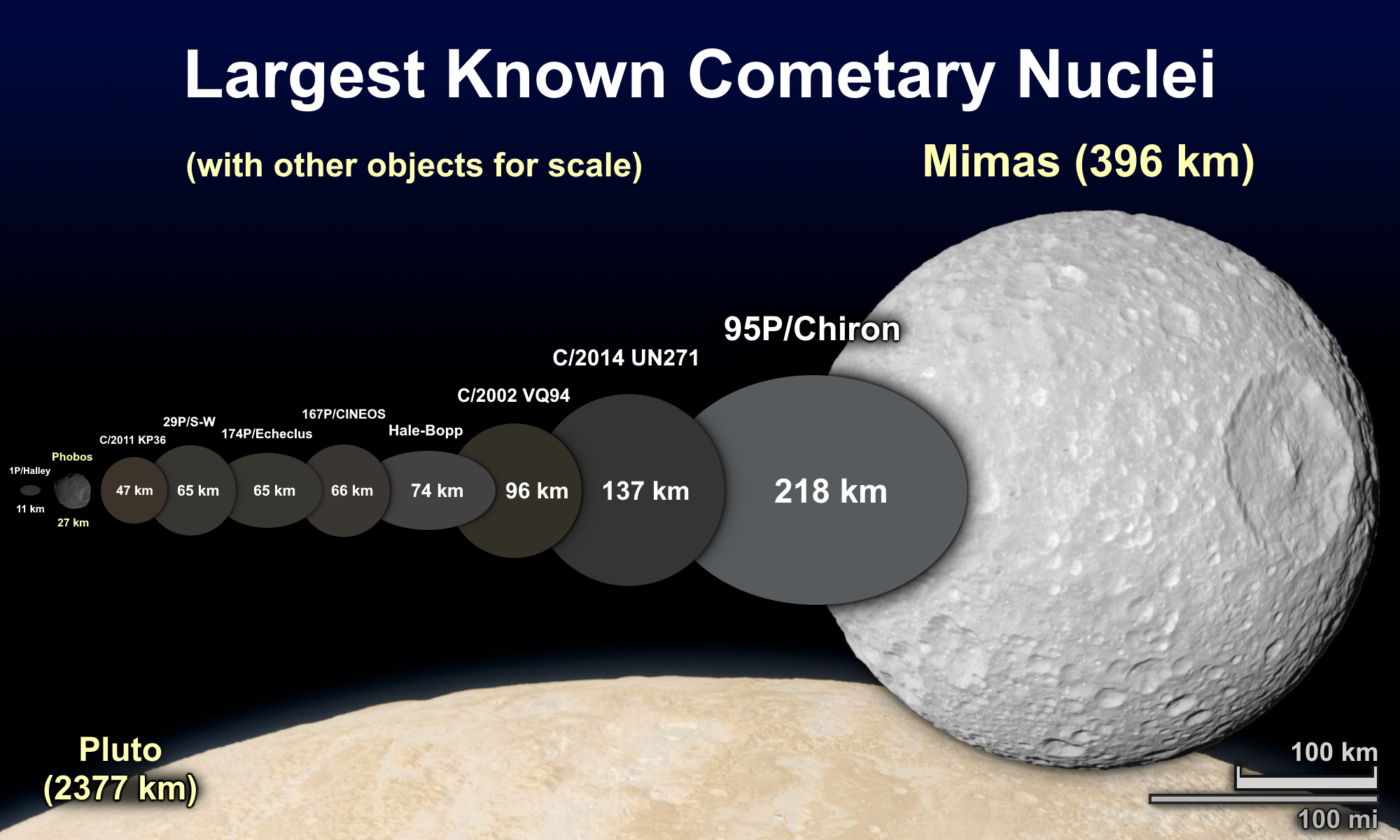
Size and color comparison of the largest known comets, including dwarf planet Pluto and natural satellites Mimas and Phobos for scale. C/2014 UN_{271} is the second-largest known comet, being only behind 95P/Chiron.

Radio thermal emission measurements by the Atacama Large Millimeter Array (ALMA) in 2021 estimate a maximum diameter of 137 ± 17 km (85 ± 11 mi) for C/2014 UN_{271}'s nucleus, assuming negligible contamination of the nucleus's thermal emission by an unseen dust coma. The ALMA measurements have not ruled out the possibility of a dust coma contaminating up to 24% of the nucleus's thermal emission, so the actual diameter may well be smaller. Hubble Space Telescope observations confirmed C/2014 UN_{271}'s large size in 2022, placing a lower limit diameter of 119 ± 15 km (74 ± 9 mi) for the maximum possible dust coma contamination.

Even at its minimum estimated diameter, C/2014 UN_{271} is the largest Oort cloud comet discovered, being more than 50 times larger than a typical comet which is less than 2 km (1.2 mi) in diameter. The previous largest known long-period comet was C/2002 VQ_{94} (LINEAR) with a diameter of 96 km (60 mi), followed by Comet Hale–Bopp at 74 km (46 mi). (Note: The Comet of 1729 (C/1729 P1) may be also a large comet with a diameter potentially up to 100 km (62 mi), but this estimate is highly uncertain.) The only known comet larger than C/2014 UN_{271} is the active centaur 95P/Chiron, which has a diameter of approximately 215 km (134 mi).

While the mass and density of C/2014 UN_{271} have not yet been measured, a rough estimate by NASA places its mass at 450 quadrillion kg (500 trillion short tons), about 100,000 times greater than that of a typical comet.

=== Albedo and color ===
Without its coma, the nucleus of C/2014 UN_{271} has a visual (V-band) absolute magnitude of 8.63±0.11, which is calculated from its distance and apparent magnitude. Given the minimum estimated diameter (119 km) and absolute magnitude, the nucleus is calculated to have a very low visual geometric albedo up to 4.4%±1.2%, meaning that it reflects only 4.4%±1.2% of visible light—making its surface darker than coal. For the maximum estimated diameter (137 km), the minimum albedo of the nucleus would be 3.3%±0.9%. C/2014 UN_{271}'s low albedo is characteristic of small comet nuclei from both short- and long-period populations, suggesting a lack of correlation between albedo, nucleus size, and orbit type in Solar System comets. The low albedos of cometary nuclei are generally attributed to the deposition of carbon, organic compounds, and sulfides produced by cosmic rays dissociating molecules on the nucleus's surface.

Optical observations of C/2014 UN_{271} during its inbound passage show that its nucleus appears more reflective at longer wavelengths, indicating a moderately red color similar to (albeit slightly less red than) most long-period comets. The albedo and color of C/2014 UN_{271}'s nucleus are expected to change over time due to cometary activity, especially after perihelion passage when temperatures decrease; its nucleus is massive enough to gravitationally recapture deposited icy ejecta back onto its surface, similar to what has been observed on Comet Hale–Bopp after its perihelion.

=== Rotation ===
The rotation period of 2014 UN_{271}'s nucleus is disputed, as some studies found no significant rotational periodicity in its light curve. Continuous observations by TESS in 2018 and 2020 did not detect any periodicity, placing an upper limit of 0.3 magnitudes for the nucleus's amplitude of variability. In 2021, Bernardinelli and collaborators from the DES analyzed various ground-based telescope datasets from 2018 and earlier, finding an apparent nucleus variability of 0.2 magnitudes, but no periodicity due to sparse data. Bernardinelli et al. do not rule out other factors such as small dust outbursts that may contribute to this apparent variability, leaving room for the possibility that the nucleus's true rotational variability may be even less than 0.2 magnitudes. In April 2022, astronomers Ignacio Ferrin and A. Ferrero reported a nucleus rotation period of 20.6±0.2 days, based on an analysis of 2014 UN_{271}'s long-term light curve behavior in observations from the Minor Planet Center's database. Ferrin and Ferrero found a nucleus light curve amplitude of 0.5±0.1 magnitudes, incongruous with findings by TESS and Bernardinelli et al.

== Cometary properties ==
The exponential brightening of C/2014 UN_{271}'s coma at 20–25 AU is consistent with it being generated by sublimating carbon dioxide (CO_{2}) or ammonia (NH_{3}) ices from the nucleus's surface. Less abundant supervolatile substances such as carbon monoxide (CO) are likely present in C/2014 UN_{271} and may additionally contribute to its distant activity, but their emissions remain yet to be detected. Infrared NEOWISE observations from November 2020 did not detect any CO gas emission from C/2014 UN_{271} at 20.9 AU, placing an upper limit CO outgassing rate at about ten times that of Comet Hale–Bopp at the same heliocentric distance.

Analysis of C/2014 UN_{271}'s coma shape in TESS images from 2018–2020 suggests that the coma is composed of submillimeter-sized dust grains ejected at low speeds around 10 m/s (33 ft/s), indicating that the comet had become active 2 to 10 years prior to 2018. Based on the coma's brightness in Hubble observations from January 2022, C/2014 UN_{271} is losing mass at a rate of roughly 1,000 kg/s (1.1 short ton/s) at 20 AU, similar to Comet Hale–Bopp at this distance.

== Orbit and origin ==
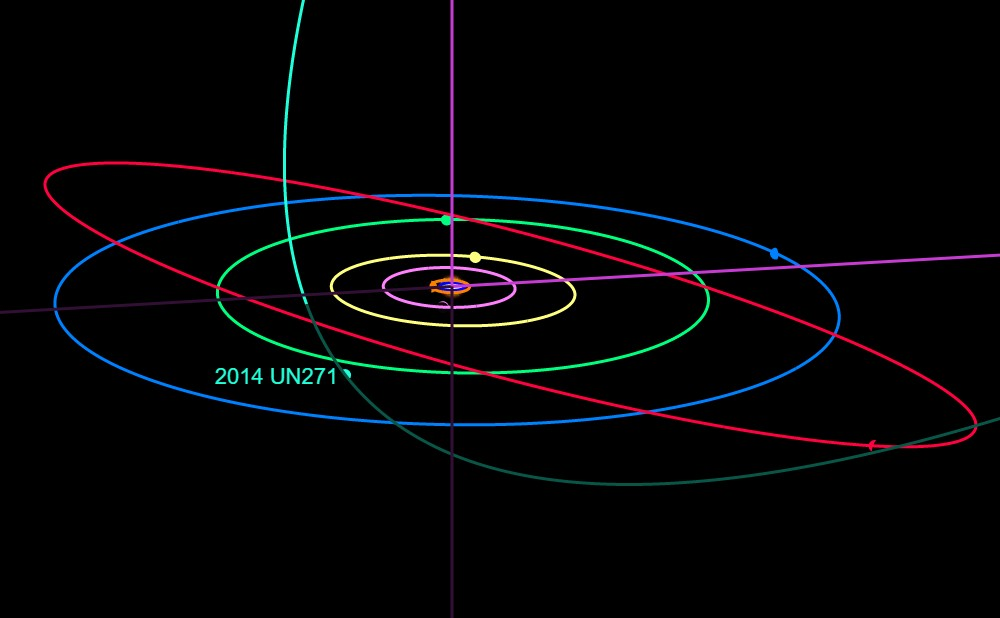
Orbit diagram of C/2014 UN_{271}'s near-parabolic trajectory passing perpendicularly through the outer Solar System

C/2014 UN_{271} came from the Oort cloud and has been inside of the orbit of Neptune (29.9 AU) since March 2014 and passed inside the orbit of Uranus (18.3 AU) in September 2022. (Note: The planets have eccentric orbits, so heliocentric distances inside a planet's orbit are less than its perihelion, while distances outside a planet's orbit are greater than its aphelion.) The time of perihelion has been well-known since June 2021. The current 3-sigma uncertainty in the comet's distance from the Sun is ±10,000 km.

The inbound and outbound orbital period of an Oort cloud comet are never exactly the same as the orbit changes as a result of planetary perturbations. For an Oort cloud comet an orbit defined while inside of the planetary region can produce results that are misleading. Therefore, the inbound and outbound orbits should be computed before entering the planetary region and after leaving the planetary region. With an observation arc of several years using dozens of observations, the orbit of C/2014 UN_{271} is securely known. (Note: JPL 1 (4 year arc) defined at epoch 2021-Jul-01 had aphelion (Q) = ~14,300 AU and period = ~604,000 years. The current orbit (15 year arc) defined at epoch 2021-Jul-01 also has aphelion (AD) = 14,500 AU and period = ~620,000 years. The solutions are basically the same.) Its incoming orbit in 1600, as calculated by JPL Horizons, has a semimajor axis of 21,000 AU (0.3 ly). This indicates that C/2014 UN_{271} was at its furthest distance, or aphelion, of 42,000 AU (0.7 ly) in the Oort cloud around 1.5 million years ago. (Note: While a loosely bound long-period comet such as C/2014 UN_{271} is in the planetary region of the Solar System at an epoch defined near the present year, the JPL Small-Body Database can show a misleading heliocentric orbit solution that does not display the true inbound or outbound orbital period or true aphelion distances. The orbit of a long-period comet is properly obtained when the osculating orbit is computed using the Solar System barycenter as its reference frame, at an epoch before and/or after leaving the planetary region. Using an epoch of 1600 (inbound) and 2500 (outbound) will generate much more meaningful results.) It will come to perihelion (closest approach to the Sun) around 23 January 2031 at a distance of 10.95 AU (1.6 billion km; 1.0 billion mi), just outside the aphelion of Saturn's orbit (10.1 AU). It will make its closest approach to Earth around 5 April 2031 at a distance of 10.1 AU (1.5 billion km; 0.94 billion mi). It will cross the ecliptic plane on 8 August 2033 when it is outbound 12.0 AU from the Sun. Its outbound orbital period will be approximately 5 million years with an aphelion distance of about 59,000 AU (0.9 ly). The object is only very loosely bound to the Sun and subject to perturbations by the galactic tide while in the Oort cloud.

Large, long-period comets such as C/2014 UN_{271} are rarely found due to a phenomenon known as fading: comets on bound orbits around the Sun periodically lose mass and volatile content to activity in each perihelion passage, resulting in a gradual diminishing in size, brightness, and activity as they age. This adds further evidence to C/2014 UN_{271} being a dynamically new comet.

Comets from the outer Oort Cloud
Comet	Inbound Epoch 1600 Barycentric Aphelion (AU)	Outbound Epoch 2500 Barycentric Aphelion (AU)	Reference
C/1980 E1 (Bowell)	74,000	hyperbolic	Horizons
C/1999 F1 (Catalina)	55,000	66,000	Horizons
C/2000 W1 (Utsunomiya–Jones)	69,000	1,700	Horizons
C/2003 A2 (Gleason)	43,000	14,000	Horizons
C/2006 P1 (McNaught)	67,000	4,100	Horizons
C/2010 U3 (Boattini)	34,000	9,900	Horizons
C/2011 L4 (PanSTARRS)	68,000	4,500	Horizons
Comet ISON	hyperbolic	hyperbolic	Horizons
C/2013 A1 (Siding Spring)	52,000	13,000	Horizons
C/2013 US_{10} (Catalina)	38,000	hyperbolic	Horizons
C/2014 UN_{271} (Bernardinelli–Bernstein)	40,000	60,000	Horizons
C/2017 K2 (PanSTARRS)	48,000	1,800	Horizons
C/2017 T2 (PanSTARRS)	74,000	2,900	Horizons
C/2019 E3 (ATLAS)	71,000	36,000	Horizons

== Exploration ==
As of 2022 there are no mission proposals to C/2014 UN_{271}, nor are there any upcoming missions that can be retargeted to the comet. The European Space Agency's upcoming Comet Interceptor mission, which will launch in 2029 and make a flyby of a long-period comet within Earth's orbit, will not be able to reach C/2014 UN_{271} due to its large perihelion distance.

According to a 2021 study by the Initiative for Interstellar Studies, a future flyby mission with a direct, low-energy trajectory to C/2014 UN_{271} can have yearly optimal launch windows between September and October throughout 2022–2029, for a maximum delta-v of 12 km/s at Earth. In all scenarios, the spacecraft would optimally arrive to C/2014 UN_{271} at a relative velocity of 12–14 km/s by August 2033, when the comet crosses the ecliptic plane at 11.9 AU from the Sun. For instance a mission similar to New Horizons (with the same launch vehicle but no Jupiter encounter) could reach C/2014 UN_{271} by August 2033 if launched in October 2029. Alternatively, a flyby trajectory to C/2014 UN_{271} using a combined gravity assist and Oberth maneuver at Jupiter can have feasible launch dates from 2020–2027 and 2034–2037. A launch within the latter window could utilize an Earth flyby to Jupiter after completing a 1:1 Earth resonant orbit, which would significantly reduce the characteristic energy at Earth launch and allow for target arrival above the ecliptic. A flyby trajectory using consecutive gravity assists and orbital resonances from the inner planets is also possible, but the most optimal encounter combinations provide launch dates up to 2028, for a late 2033 arrival time.

A rendezvous trajectory to C/2014 UN_{271} has been considered, although the comet's nearly-perpendicular orbit renders any direct rendezvous trajectory from the ecliptic unfeasible. Nonetheless, a rendezvous with C/2014 UN_{271} can be performed with a Jupiter gravity assist after the comet has crossed the ecliptic, with optimal launch dates in 2030–2034 and flight durations around 14–15 years.

== See also ==
- List of Solar System objects by greatest aphelion
