= C/1961 R1 (Humason) =

Non-periodic comet

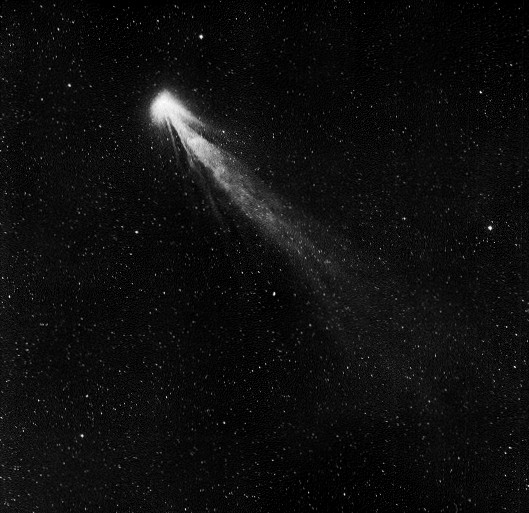
- Comet Humason photographed from the Palomar Observatory on 4 September 1962

Discovery
- Discovered by: Milton L. Humason
- Discovery date: 1 September 1961

Designations
- Alternative designations: 1961e 1962 VIII

Orbital characteristics
- Epoch: 12 May 1963 (JD 2438161.5)
- Observation arc: 1,517 days (4.15 years)
- Number of observations: 80
- Aphelion: 408.71 AU
- Perihelion: 2.133 AU
- Semi-major axis: 205.42 AU
- Eccentricity: 0.98961
- Orbital period: 2,883 years (inbound); 2,516 years (outbound)
- Inclination: 153.278°
- Longitude of ascending node: 155.439°
- Argument of periapsis: 233.562°
- Last perihelion: 10 December 1962
- T_{Jupiter}: –1.588
- Earth MOID: 1.2247 AU
- Jupiter MOID: 1.0725 AU

Physical characteristics
- Dimensions: 30–41 km (19–25 mi)
- Comet total magnitude (M1): 1.35–3.5
- Comet nuclear magnitude (M2): 10.1

Comet Humason, formally designated C/1961 R1 (a.k.a. 1962 VIII and 1961e), was a non-periodic comet discovered by Milton L. Humason on 1 September 1961. Its perihelion was well beyond the orbit of Mars, at 2.133 AU. The outbound orbital period is about 2,516 years.

== Physical properties ==
It was a "giant" comet, much more active than a normal comet for its distance to the Sun, with an absolute magnitude of 1.35−3.5, and a nucleus diameter estimated at 30–40 km (19–25 mi). It could have been up to a hundred times brighter than an average new comet. It had an unusually disrupted or "turbulent" appearance. It was also unusual in that the spectrum of its tail showed a strong predominance of the ion CO^{+}, a result previously seen unambiguously only in C/1908 R1 (Morehouse).

== See also ==
- C/1729 P1 (Sarabat)
- C/1995 O1 (Hale–Bopp)
- C/2014 UN_{271} (Bernardinelli–Bernstein)
