= Comet LONEOS =

Comet LONEOS may refer to any of the 18 comets discovered by the Lowell Observatory Near-Earth-Object Search (LONEOS) program between 1993 and 2008.

== Periodic comets ==
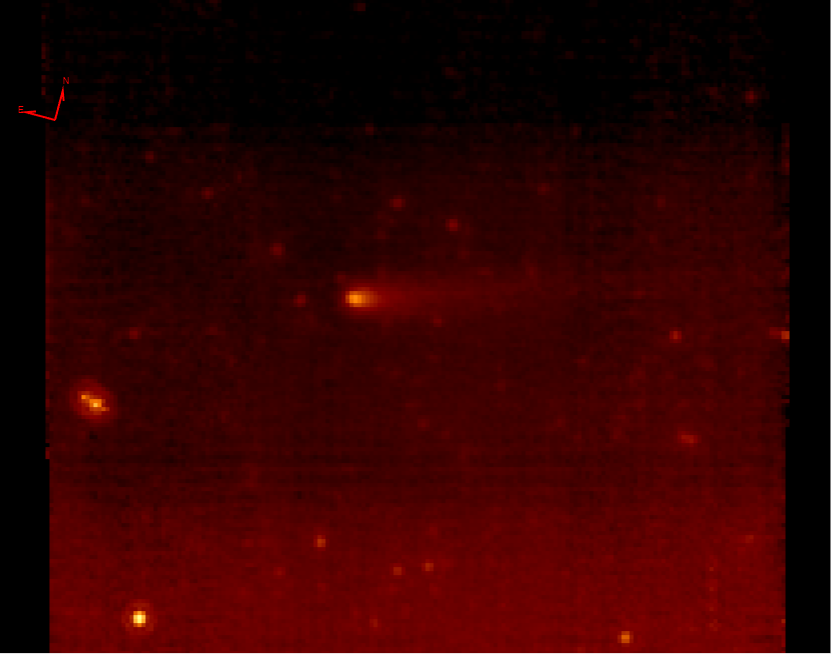
450P/LONEOS

- 150P/LONEOS
- 159P/LONEOS
- 182P/LONEOS
- 201P/LONEOS
- 267P/LONEOS
- 315P/LONEOS
- 359P/LONEOS
- 376P/LONEOS
- 450P/LONEOS
- 493P/LONEOS
- P/1999 RO28 (LONEOS)

== Non-periodic comets ==
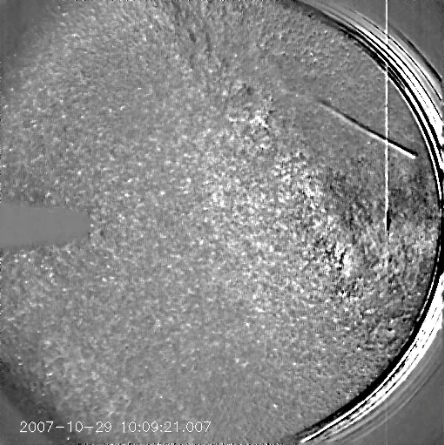
C/2007 F1 (LONEOS)

- C/2000 S3 (LONEOS)
- C/2001 G1 (LONEOS)
- C/2001 OG108 (LONEOS)
- C/2002 R3 (LONEOS)
- C/2005 EL173 (LONEOS)
- C/2006 S3 (LONEOS)
- C/2007 F1 (LONEOS)

== Others ==
"Comet LONEOS" may also be an incomplete reference to comets co-discovered with the LONEOS program:

- 316P/LONEOS–Christensen
- 328P/LONEOS–Tucker
- 343P/NEAT–LONEOS
- 409P/LONEOS–Hill
- 462P/LONEOS–PANSTARRS
