= C/2002 VQ94 (LINEAR) =

Non-periodic comet

C/2002 VQ_{94} (LINEAR)
Discovery
- Discovery site: LINEAR
- Discovery date: 11 November 2002

Designations
- MPC designation: C/2002 VQ_{94} C/2011 H1

Orbital characteristics
- Epoch: 2 September 2006 (JD 2453980.5)
- Observation arc: 9.52 years
- Earliest precovery date: 27 October 2001
- Number of observations: 1,292
- Aphelion: ~371 AU (inbound); ~364 AU (outbound)
- Perihelion: 6.797 AU
- Semi-major axis: 201.61 AU
- Eccentricity: 0.96405 (inbound); 0.96628 (near perihelion); 0.96336 (outbound)
- Orbital period: ~2,597 years (inbound); ~2,521 years (outbound)
- Inclination: 70.516°
- Longitude of ascending node: 35.015°
- Argument of periapsis: 100.05°
- Last perihelion: 6 February 2006
- T_{Jupiter}: 1.095
- Earth MOID: 6.446 AU
- Jupiter MOID: 4.102 AU

Physical characteristics
- Mean diameter: 96 ± 4 km (59.7 ± 2.5 mi)
- Spectral type: (V–R) = 0.50±0.02
- Comet total magnitude (M1): 9.3
- Apparent magnitude: 15.7 (2002 apparition)

C/2002 VQ_{94} (LINEAR) is a non-periodic comet with a comet nucleus estimated to be ≈100 km in diameter. It was discovered on 11 November 2002 by LINEAR. It only brightened to total apparent magnitude 15.7 because the perihelion point of 6.7 AU (1.00 billion km) was outside of the inner Solar System.

== Orbit ==
The comet has an observation arc of 9.5 years allowing a very good estimate of the inbound (original) and outbound (future) orbits. The orbit of a long-period comet is properly obtained when the osculating orbit is computed at an epoch after leaving the planetary region and is calculated with respect to the center of mass of the Solar System. Inbound JPL Horizons shows an epoch 1950 barycentric orbital period of 2,597 years with aphelion of 371 AU from the Sun. Outbound with an epoch of 2050 JPL Horizons shows a period of approximately 2,521 years and an aphelion distance of 364 AU.

Precovery images from October 2001 when the comet was 11.7 AU (1.75 billion km) from the Sun are known. Cometary activity was first detected at the end of August 2003 when the comet was 8.8 AU (1.32 billion km) from the Sun.

== Visibility ==
Even though they have a large nucleus, comets such as C/2002 VQ_{94} (≈100 km), 95P/Chiron (≈200 km), and C/2014 UN271 (≈150 km) do not become visible to the naked eye because they stay outside of the inner Solar System. C/1729 P1 (Sarabat) (≈100 km) was visible to the naked eye as it passed 4 AU (600 million km) from the Sun. Comet Hale–Bopp (≈60 km) came within 1 AU of the Sun.
