= NGC 4375 =

Galaxy in the constellation Coma Berenices

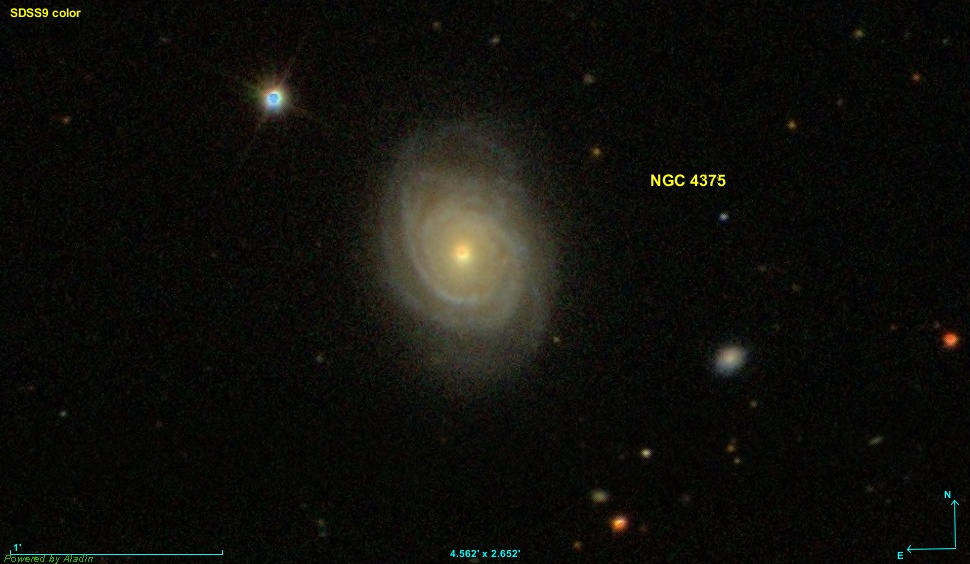
- NGC 4375 imaged by SDSS

Observation data (J2000 epoch)
- Constellation: Coma Berenices
- Right ascension: 12^{h} 25^{m} 00.4734^{s}
- Declination: +28° 33′ 30.952″
- Redshift: 0.030153
- Heliocentric radial velocity: 9040 ± 3 km/s
- Distance: 448.6 ± 31.4 Mly (137.54 ± 9.63 Mpc)
- Apparent magnitude (V): 12.6

Characteristics
- Type: SB(r)ab pec?
- Size: ~148,000 ly (45.37 kpc) (estimated)
- Apparent size (V): 1.4′ × 1.2′

Other designations
- IRAS 12224+2850, 2MASX J12250049+2833306, UGC 7496, MCG +05-29-080, PGC 40449, CGCG 158-100

NGC 4375 is a barred spiral galaxy in the constellation of Coma Berenices. Its velocity with respect to the cosmic microwave background is 9325 ± 20 km/s, which corresponds to a Hubble distance of 137.54 ± 9.63 Mpc (~448 million light-years). However, four non-redshift measurements give a closer distance of 105.5 Mpc (~344 million light-years). The galaxy was discovered by German-British astronomer William Herschel on 11 April 1785.

The SIMBAD database lists NGC 4375 as a Seyfert II Galaxy, i.e. it has a quasar-like nuclei with very high surface brightnesses whose spectra reveal strong, high-ionisation emission lines, but unlike quasars, the host galaxy is clearly detectable.

== Supernovae ==
Two supernovae have been observed in NGC 4375:

- SN 1960J (type unknown, mag. 18.5) was discovered by Milton Humason on 18 June 1960.
- SN 2023vsr (Type II, mag. 17.6478) was discovered by the Zwicky Transient Facility on 24 October 2023.

== See also ==
- List of NGC objects (4001–5000)
