= NGC 550 =

Spiral galaxy in the constellation Cetus

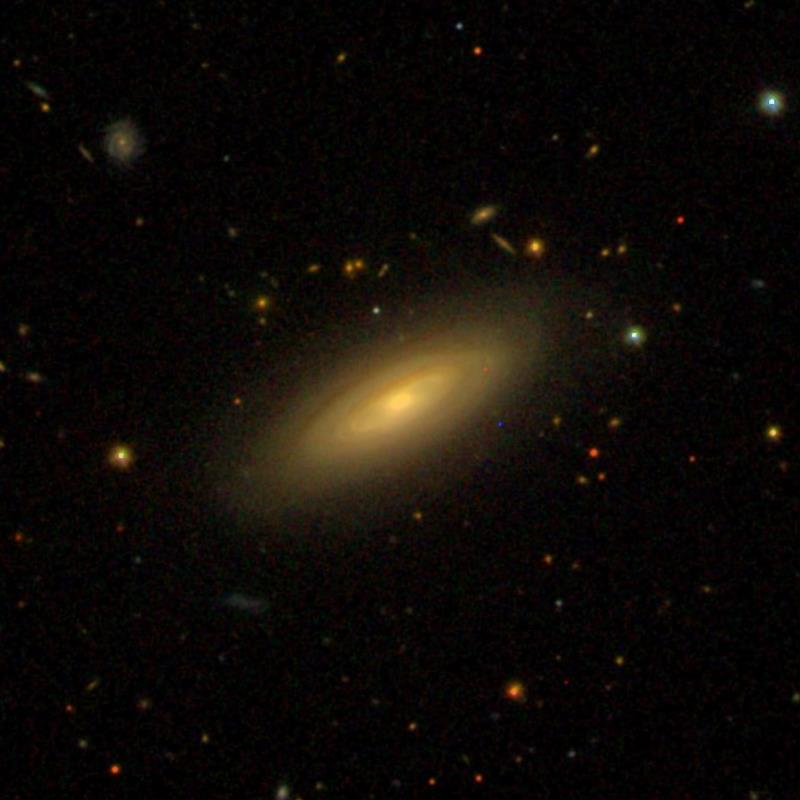
- SDSS image of NGC 550

Observation data (J2000 epoch)
- Constellation: Cetus
- Right ascension: 01^{h} 26^{m} 42.560^{s}
- Declination: +02° 01′ 20.52″
- Redshift: 0.019560
- Heliocentric radial velocity: 5807 km/s
- Distance: 303.7 Mly (93.10 Mpc)
- Apparent magnitude (B): 15.0

Characteristics
- Type: SB(s)a?

Other designations
- UGC 1021, MCG +00-04-146, PGC 5374

NGC 550 is a spiral galaxy in the constellation Cetus. It is estimated to be about 300 million light-years from the Milky Way and has a diameter of approximately 110,000 light years. The German-British astronomer William Herschel discovered it on 8 October 1785.

One supernova has been observed in NGC 550: SN 1961Q (type unknown, mag. 17.2) was discovered by Milton Humason on 30 November 1961.

== See also ==
- List of NGC objects (1–1000)
