= NGC 5082 =

Galaxy in the constellation Centaurus

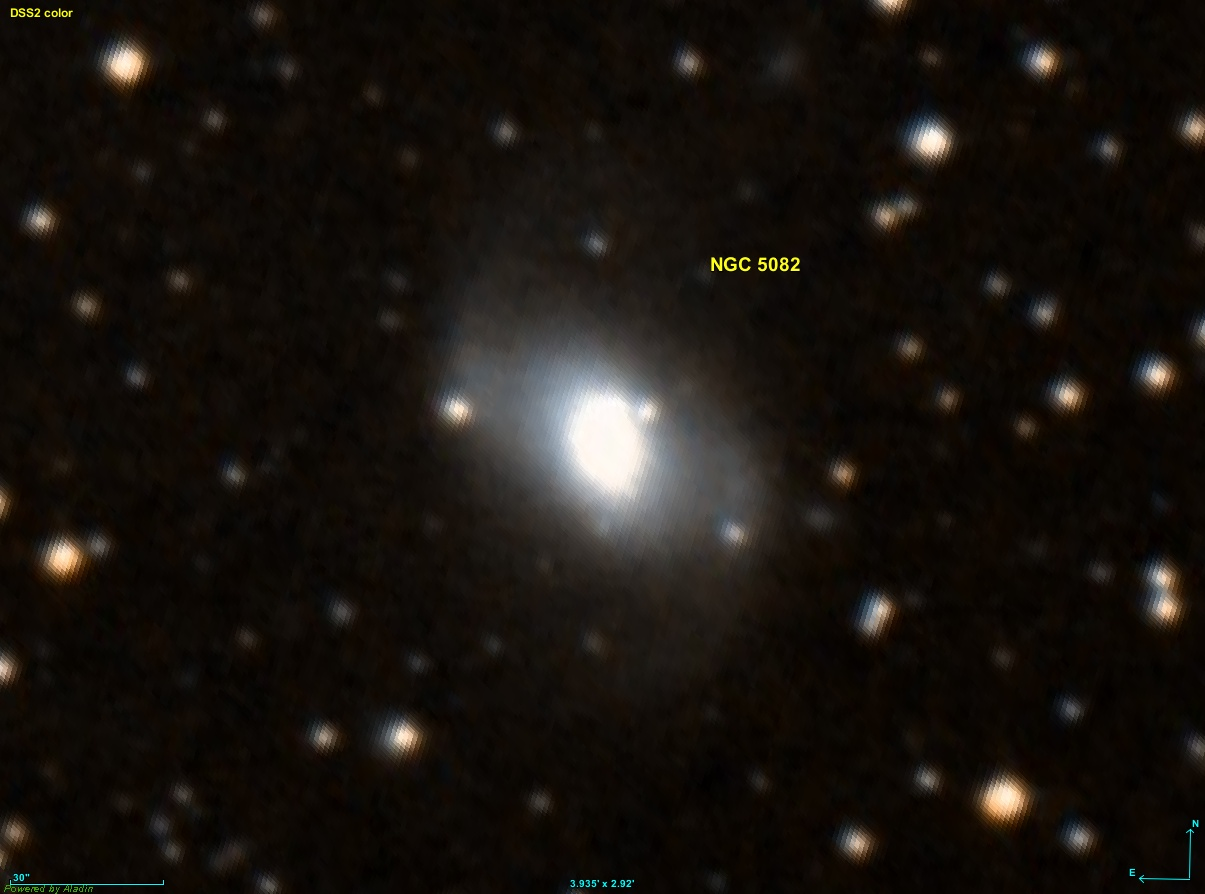
- NGC 5082 imaged by DSS

Observation data (J2000 epoch)
- Constellation: Centaurus
- Right ascension: 13^{h} 20^{m} 40.0345^{s}
- Declination: −43° 41′ 59.799″
- Redshift: 0.012996±0.000140
- Heliocentric radial velocity: 3,896±42 km/s
- Distance: 152.97 ± 3.46 Mly (46.900 ± 1.060 Mpc)
- Group or cluster: NGC 5082 group (LGG 348)
- Apparent magnitude (V): 13.75

Characteristics
- Type: SB0^0(rs)
- Size: ~112,300 ly (34.42 kpc) (estimated)
- Apparent size (V): 1.7′ × 1.0′

Other designations
- ESO 269- G 089, 2MASX J13204003-4341598, MCG -07-27-053, PGC 46566

NGC 5082 is a lenticular galaxy in the constellation of Centaurus. Its velocity with respect to the cosmic microwave background is 4,153±46 km/s, which corresponds to a Hubble distance of 199.8 ± 14.3 Mly (61.25 ± 4.38 Mpc). However, three non-redshift measurements give a closer mean distance of 152.97 ± 3.46 Mly (46.900 ± 1.060 Mpc). It was discovered by British astronomer John Herschel on 3 June 1834.

NGC 5082 has a possible active galactic nucleus, i.e. it has a compact region at the center of a galaxy that emits a significant amount of energy across the electromagnetic spectrum, with characteristics indicating that this luminosity is not produced by the stars.

== NGC 5082 group ==
NGC 5082 is a member of a small group of galaxies named after it. The other two galaxies in the NGC 5082 group (also known as LGG 348) are ESO 270-7 and ESO 270-14.

== Supernova ==
One supernova has been observed in NGC 5082:

- SN 1958F (type unknown, mag. 16) was discovered by Milton L. Humason on 13 June 1958.

== See also ==
- List of NGC objects (5001–6000)
