= C/2019 E3 (ATLAS) =

Hyperbolic comet

Discovery
- Discovered by: D. Young
- Discovery site: ATLAS–MLO (T08)
- Discovery date: 5 March 2019

Designations
- Alternative designations: CK19E030; A10ckQ4

Orbital characteristics
- Epoch: 28 July 2022 (JD 2459788.5)
- Observation arc: 4969 days (13.60 years)
- Earliest precovery date: 19 March 2012
- Number of observations: 953 (used in orbital fit)
- Aphelion: Barycentric: ~65,200 AU
- Perihelion: 10.314 AU
- Semi-major axis: Barycentric: ~32,600 AU
- Eccentricity: 1.00108 (current)
- Orbital period: Barycentric: ~5.9 million years
- Inclination: 84.298°
- Longitude of ascending node: 347.25°
- Argument of periapsis: 280.66°
- Mean anomaly: –0.0005°
- Last perihelion: 14 November 2023
- T_{Jupiter}: 0.417
- Earth MOID: 10.068 AU
- Jupiter MOID: 8.3305 AU

Physical characteristics
- Mean diameter: ~3.0 km (1.9 mi)
- Comet total magnitude (M1): 6.1
- Comet nuclear magnitude (M2): 7.8

Comet ATLAS, formally designated as C/2019 E3, is an Oort cloud comet with a very distant perihelion of 10.30 AU (1.541 billion km), the third known comet with a perihelion distance beyond 10 AU after 167P/CINEOS and C/2003 A2 (Gleason).

Precovery observations of this comet all the way to 2016 (and later 2012) have revealed that the comet had produced some cometary activity more than 20 AU (3.0 billion km) from the Sun, making it the fourth known distant comet to produce such activity at large distances after C/2010 U3 (Boattini), C/2014 UN271 (Bernardinelli–Bernstein), and C/2017 K2 (PanSTARRS).
