= C/2006 S3 (LONEOS) =

Hyperbolic comet

Discovery
- Discovered by: LONEOS; Georgi Mandushev
- Discovery site: Lowell Observatory
- Discovery date: 19 September 2006

Designations
- Alternative designations: CK06S030

Orbital characteristics
- Epoch: 22 April 2012 (JD 2456039.5)
- Observation arc: 14.18 years
- Earliest precovery date: 13 October 1999
- Number of observations: 5,568
- Perihelion: 5.131 AU
- Eccentricity: 1.00352
- Inclination: 166.03
- Longitude of ascending node: 38.371°
- Argument of periapsis: 140.13°
- Last perihelion: 16 April 2012
- T_{Jupiter}: –2.728
- Earth MOID: 4.131 AU
- Jupiter MOID: 0.146 AU

Physical characteristics
- Mean radius: 5.019±0.385 km
- Mean density: 470±70 kg/m^{3}
- Geometric albedo: 0.1 (assumed)
- Spectral type: (B–V) = 0.74±0.01; (V–R) = 0.58±0.01; (B–R) = 1.32±0.02
- Comet total magnitude (M1): 6.1
- Comet nuclear magnitude (M2): 8.4

C/2006 S3 (LONEOS) is a distant hyperbolic comet that made its last perihelion on 16 April 2012. It is one of 18 comets discovered by the Lowell Observatory Near-Earth-Object Search (LONEOS) program.

== Observational history ==
=== Discovery ===
On 19 September 2006, the comet was discovered as a 19th-magnitude object from CCD images taken by Georgi Mandushev as part of the Lowell Observatory's LONEOS program. The observatory's 1.1 m (3.6 ft) telescope revealed a moderately condensed coma about 11 arcseconds in diameter, which was slightly asymmetrical towards the east. Precovery images showed that the Catalina Sky Survey had observed the comet about two days prior on 17 September, allowing the first orbital calculations to be published.

At the time of discovery, the comet was around 14.3 AU (2.14 billion km) from the Sun, at that time the greatest distance of any known comet with detectable activity. Precovery observations from 1999 showed that it even produced cometary activity at a distance of 26.14 AU (3.910 billion km)! These records were later surpassed by both C/2010 U3 (Boattini) and C/2014 UN_{271} (Bernardinelli–Bernstein) in the following years.
