= Daniel Sarrabat =

French painter

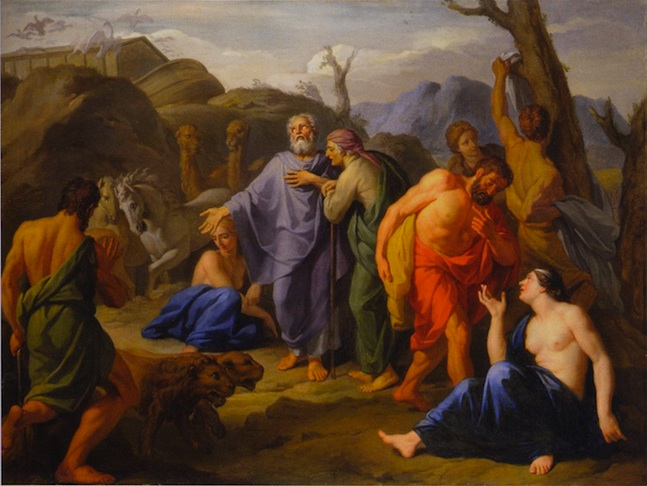
Daniel Sarrabat, Noah, His Family and the Animals Leaving the Ark, 1688.

Daniel Sarrabat (1666–1748) was a French painter.

== Biography ==
The son of a family of artists and scholars, Daniel Sarrabat was baptized in Charenton on October 10, 1666. His brother, Isaac Sarrabat, became a popular engraver.

Winner of the Prix de Rome in 1688, he spent the next two years studying at the French Academy in Rome. In 1690, he won first prize in Rome for his painting "Noah and his family out of the ark."

Returning to Lyon, he was the father of mathematician Nicolas Sarrabat.

He died in Lyon on June 21, 1748.
