= Nicolas Sarrabat =

French mathematician and scientist

Fr. Nicolas Sarrabat
- Born: 7 February 1698; Lyon
- Died: 27 April 1739 (aged 41); Paris
- Other names: Nicolas Sarrabat de la Baisse
- Known for: Demonstrating circulation in plants
- Father: Daniel Sarrabat
- Scientific career
- Fields: Mathematics, climatology, astronomy
- Institutions: University of Marseille

Fr. Nicolas Sarrabat or Sarabat (7 February 1698 – 27 April 1739), also known as Nicolas Sarrabat de la Baisse, was an eighteenth-century French mathematician and scientist. He was born in Lyon, the son of the painter Daniel Sarrabat (1666–1748), and the nephew of engraver Isaac Sarrabat. The Sarrabats had been a prosperous Protestant bourgeois family of clock- and watchmakers, though Nicolas's father had converted to Catholicism.

Sarrabat showed a love of learning from an early age. He was said to have started his studies without his parents' knowledge; they only became aware of them when Nicolas submitted and defended a thesis at the Lyon Collège de la Trinité in the presence of his father, who had been tricked into attending. He went on to enter the Jesuit order, and was employed as the Royal Professor of Mathematics at Marseille.

== Scientific papers ==
Sarrabat's scientific interests seem to have been very varied, and the Academie Royale des Belles-lettres, Sciences et Arts de Bordeaux awarded him several prizes for his work: one was for an essay on magnetism, the Nouvelle hypothèse sur les variations de l'aiguille aimantee, which argued that a spherical fire at the Earth's core was the driving force behind the expulsion of magnetic matter.

In 1730, he published the Dissertation sur les causes et les variations des vents, which sought to explain wind patterns by the action of the Sun on the atmosphere. His most famous experiments involved immersing the roots of living plants in the red juice of Phytolacca berries in order to observe circulation. As the academy, mainly to stop Sarrabat's presence discouraging other authors, had ruled that an author could not win the same prize three times, he submitted this work, Sur la circulation de la sève des plantes, under the pseudonym "Monsieur de la Baisse", but eventually confessed his true identity. The plant genus Baissea is named after him - or rather after his pseudonym - in honour of this work.

In 1735-36 Sarrabat travelled with the Chevalier de Caylus - a ship's captain and the brother of the Comte de Caylus - through the Mediterranean on an archeological excursion to the island of Milos and to Malta, describing his experiences in a series of excited and spirited letters to the Marquis de Caumont. Though Caylus came from a famously Jansenist family, the Jesuit Sarrabat struck up a great friendship with him, describing him as "un très aimable homme". Caylus and Sarrabat walked into the interior of Milos, discovering and partly unearthing a series of ancient ruins very close to where the Venus de Milo was discovered many years later.

== Astronomy ==
Sarrabat also had an interest in astronomy, and is remembered in the field for having discovered an unusual comet, the Comet of 1729 (Comet Sarabat): it is thought to have been the largest, with the greatest absolute magnitude, on record. Sarrabat discovered the comet without the aid of a telescope, though he was initially unsure if it was in fact a detached part of the Milky Way. In astronomical literature his name is often spelt "Sarabat", following the spelling used by Jacques Cassini, who made further observations of the same comet.

A colleague remembered him as "tall, with a countenance that showed the passion of the loftiness of his thought, and with a very gentle manner".

Sarrabat died in 1739 while visiting Paris on official business, or according to some sources, while seeking treatment for a liver ailment.
