= C/2007 F1 (LONEOS) =

Comet

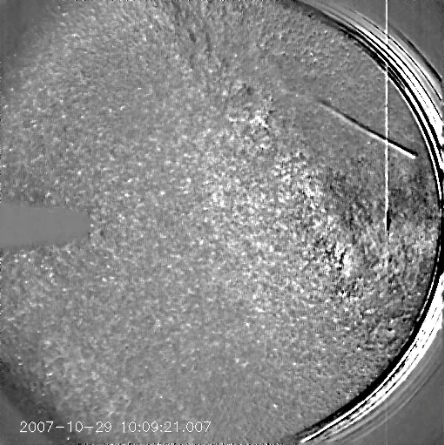
- The comet on 29 October 2007 by STEREO A

Discovery
- Discovered by: Brian A. Skiff
- Discovery date: March 19, 2007

Orbital characteristics
- Epoch: June 7, 2007 (JD 2454258.5)
- Aphelion: N/A
- Perihelion: 0.40237 AU
- Semi-major axis: N/A
- Eccentricity: 1.00009; 1.000021 (epoch 2011+)
- Orbital period: N/A
- Inclination: 116.08°
- Last perihelion: October 28, 2007
- Next perihelion: ejection

Physical characteristics
- Mean radius: 0.75±0.10 km
- Mass: 7.4×10^{11} kg
- Mean density: 440±70 kg/m^{3}
- Comet total magnitude (M1): 10.8

C/2007 F1 (LONEOS) is a hyperbolic comet discovered on March 19, 2007 as part as the Lowell Observatory Near Earth Object Search (LONEOS). The comet reached perihelion, or closest approach to the Sun on October 28, 2007.

The comet reached 5th magnitude in October, making it visible in binoculars, lying near the western horizon at the end of the twilight, before starting slowly to dim on its way out of the Solar System. It continued to move south in the sky and became visible to southern hemisphere comet chasers in mid-November.

The comet was also observed from both the STEREO spacecraft, first by STEREO-B on October 22 and then by STEREO-A for several days starting from October 28 as the comet had just passed perihelion and was receding from the Sun.
