= C/2013 US10 (Catalina) =

Oort cloud comet

C/2013 US_{10} (Catalina)
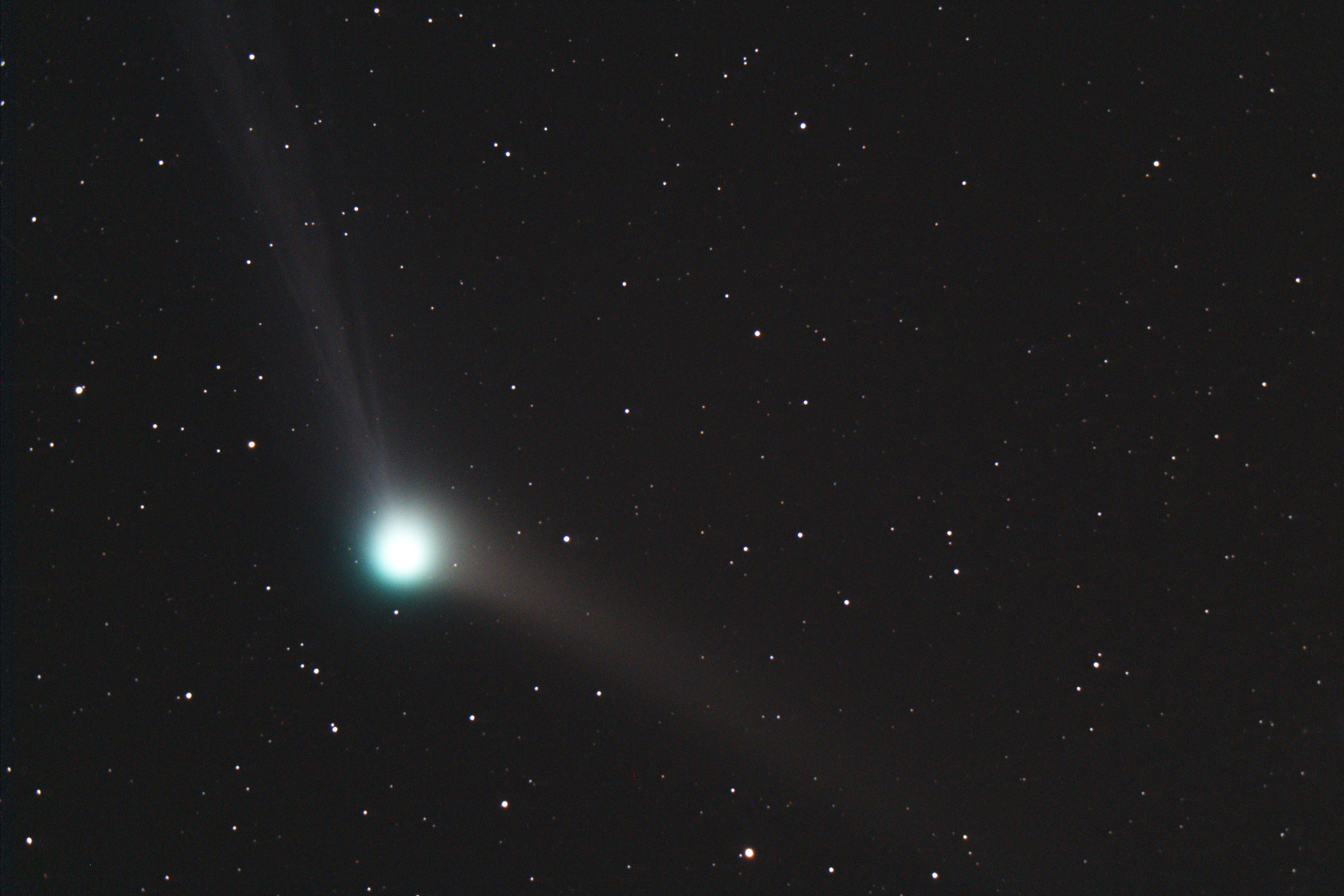
- C/2013 US_{10} as seen on 9 Dec 2015. To the upper left is the ion gas tail and to the lower right is the dust tail.

Discovery
- Discovered by: Catalina Sky Survey (703)
- Discovery date: 31 October 2013

Orbital characteristics
- Epoch: 4 December 2015
- Observation arc: 4.26 years
- Number of observations: 4396
- Orbit type: Oort cloud
- Aphelion: ~38000 AU (inbound)
- Perihelion: 0.8229 AU (q)
- Eccentricity: 1.0003; 1.000+ (heliocentric epoch 2475–2500)
- Orbital period: several million years inbound (barycentric solution for epoch 1950); Ejection trajectory outbound (barycentric solution for epoch 2050)
- Inclination: 148.87°
- Last perihelion: 15 November 2015
- Jupiter MOID: 1.13 AU

Physical characteristics
- Mean radius: 2.2 km (1.4 mi)
- Mean density: 450±80 kg/m^{3}

C/2013 US_{10} (Catalina) is an Oort cloud comet discovered on 31 October 2013 by the Catalina Sky Survey at an apparent magnitude of 19 using a 0.68-meter (27 in) Schmidt–Cassegrain telescope. From September 2015 to February 2016 the comet was around apparent magnitude 6. The comet took around a million years to complete half an orbit from its furthest distance in the Oort cloud and should be ejected from the Solar System over many millions of years.

== Overview ==
When discovered on 31 October 2013 observations from another object from 12 September 2013 were used in the preliminary orbit determination giving an incorrect solution that suggested an orbital period of only 6 years. But by 6 November 2013 a longer observation arc from 14 August until 4 November made it apparent that the first solution had the wrong object from 12 September.

By early May 2015 the comet was around apparent magnitude 12 and had an elongation of 60 degrees from the Sun as it moved further into the Southern Hemisphere. The comet came to solar conjunction on 6 November 2015 when the comet was around magnitude 6. The comet came to perihelion (closest approach to the Sun) on 15 November 2015 at a distance of 0.82 AU from the Sun. At perihelion, it had a velocity of 46.4 km/s (104,000 mph) with respect to the Sun which is slightly greater than the Sun's escape velocity at that distance. It crossed the celestial equator on 17 December 2015 becoming a Northern Hemisphere object. On 17 January 2016 the comet passed 0.72 AU (108,000,000 km; 67,000,000 mi) from Earth and was around magnitude 6 while located in the constellation of Ursa Major.

C/2013 US10 closest Earth approach on 2016-Jan-17 05:25 UT
Date & time of closest approach	Earth distance (AU)	Sun distance (AU)	Velocity wrt Earth (km/s)	Velocity wrt Sun (km/s)	Uncertainty region (3-sigma)	Reference
2016-01-17 05:25	0.7247 AU (108.41 million km; 67.37 million mi; 282.0 LD)	1.388 AU (207.6 million km; 129.0 million mi; 540 LD)	59.0	35.8	± 125 km	Horizons

C/2013 US_{10} is dynamically new. It came from the Oort cloud with a loosely bound chaotic orbit that was easily perturbed by galactic tides and passing stars. Before entering the planetary region (epoch 1950), C/2013 US_{10} had an orbital period of several million years. After leaving the planetary region (epoch 2050), it will be on an ejection trajectory. The Sun's escape velocity at 200 AU is 2.98 km/s and the comet will be going 3.0 km/s at 200 AU from the Sun.

C/2013 US10 distance and velocity compared to the Sun with a 400 year stepsize
Date	Sun distance (AU)	Velocity wrt Sun (km/s)	Uncertainty region (3-sigma)
1615-11-15	304.0 AU (45.48 billion km; 28.26 billion mi)	2.40	± 3 million km
Perihelion	0.823 AU (123.1 million km; 76.5 million mi)	46.4	± 140 km
2415-11-15	306.9 AU (45.91 billion km; 28.53 billion mi)	2.44	± 5 million km

== Gallery ==
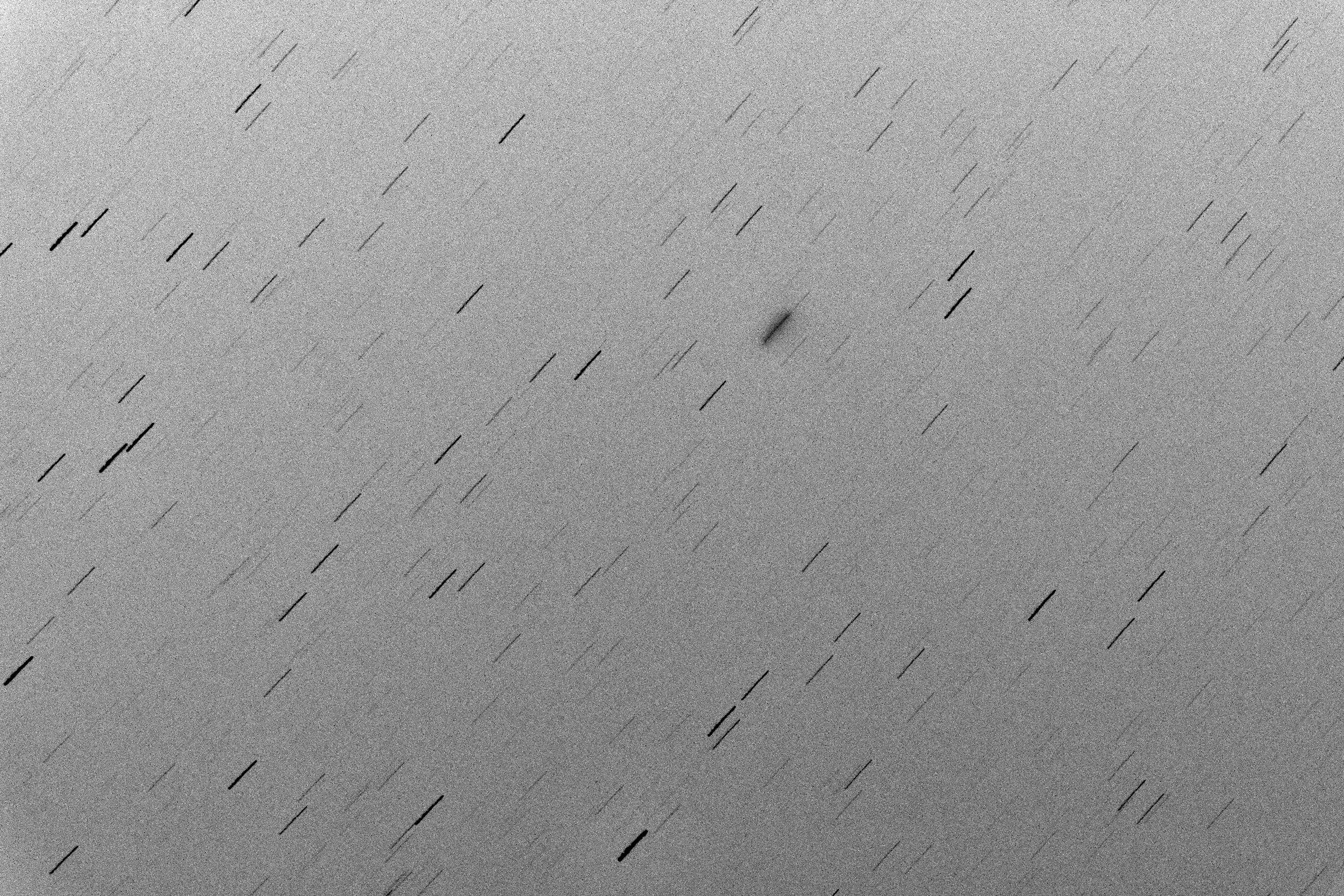
Comet C/2013 US_{10} (Warsaw, Poland; 10 January 2016, 02:51 UT+1)

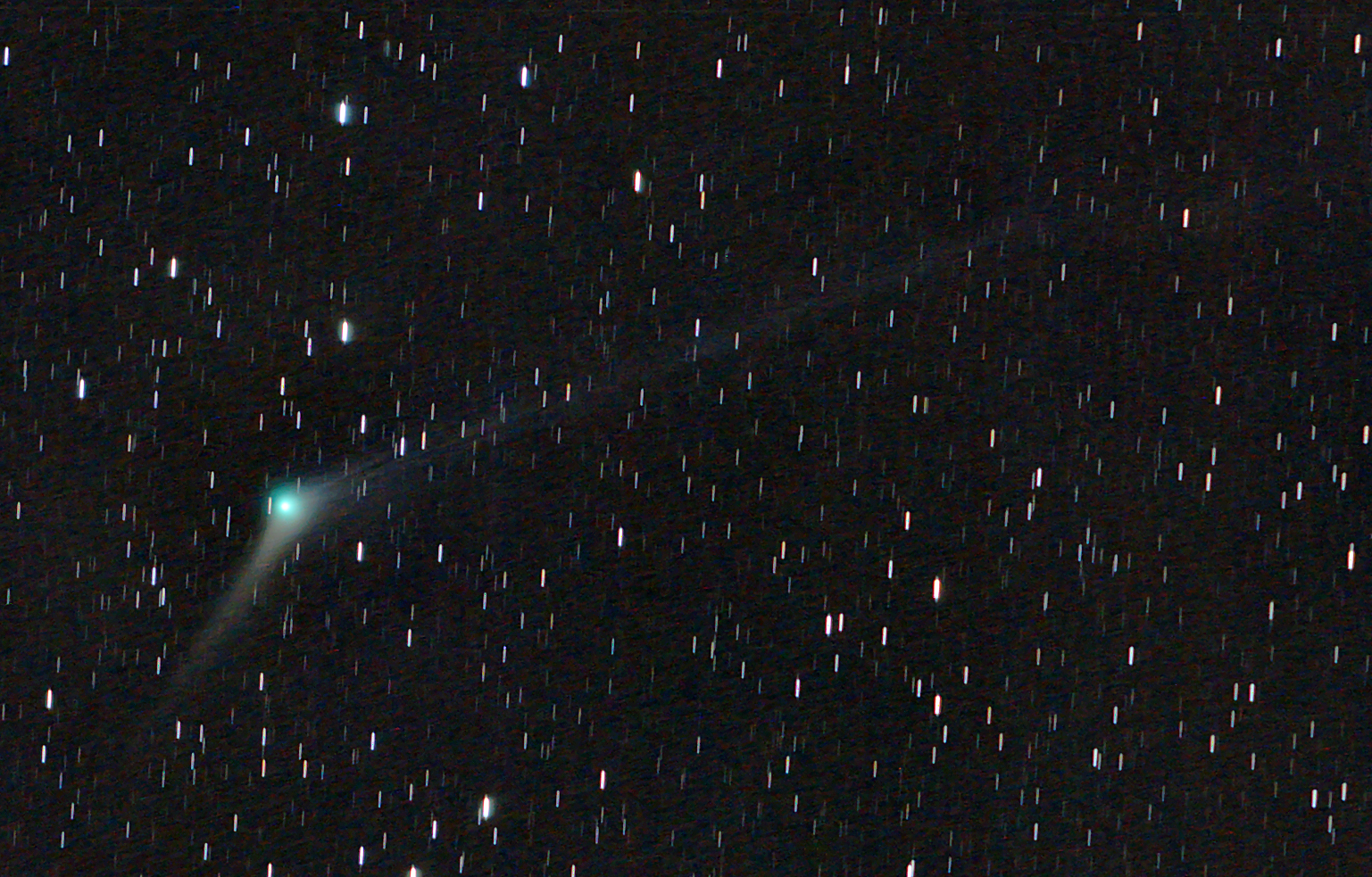
C/2013 US_{10} imaged on 6 December 2015

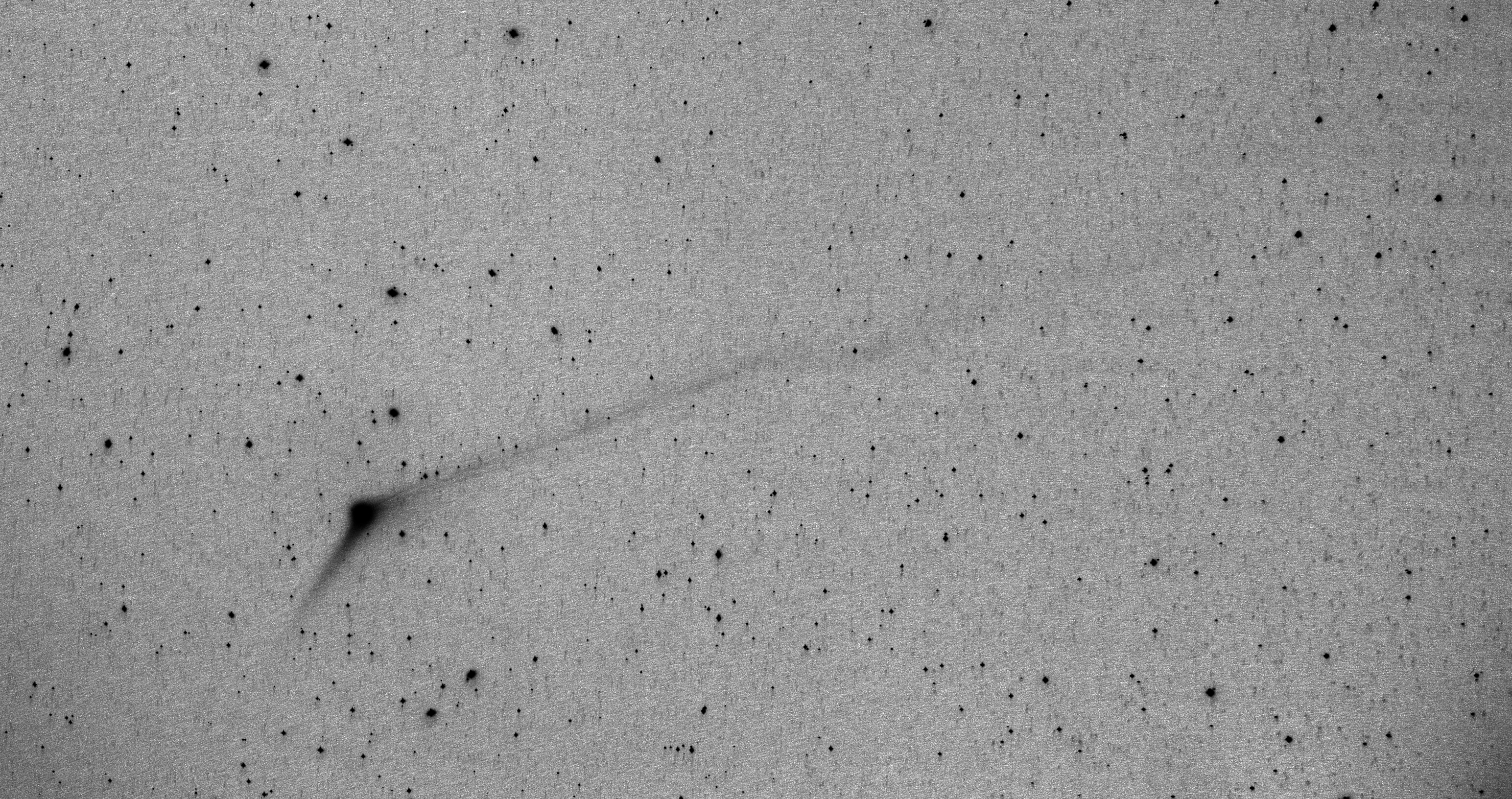
C/2013 US_{10} imaged on 6 December 2015 (black and white)
