= C/1729 P1 (Sarabat) =

Parabolic comet

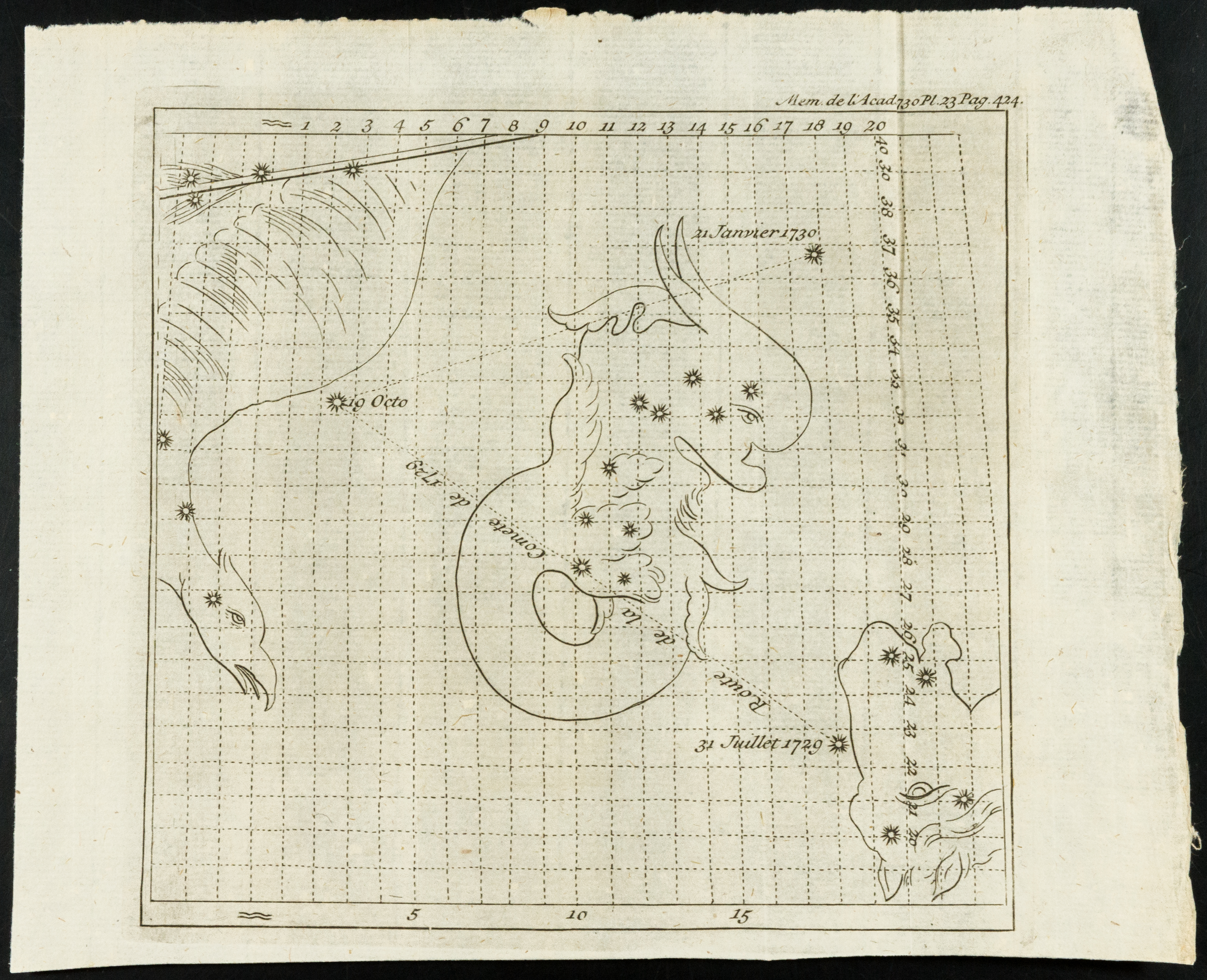
- A celestial map detailing the path of Comet Sarabat across the sky by Jacques Cassini

Discovery
- Discovered by: Fr. Nicolas Sarabat
- Discovery site: Nîmes, France
- Discovery date: 1 August 1729

Designations
- Alternative designations: Comet of 1729

Orbital characteristics
- Epoch: 16 June 1729 (JD 2352731.148)
- Observation arc: 135 days
- Number of observations: 3 (very poorly determined)
- Perihelion: 4.05054 AU
- Eccentricity: ~1.000 (assumed)
- Inclination: 77.095°
- Longitude of ascending node: 314.393°
- Argument of periapsis: 10.403°
- Last perihelion: 16 June 1729
- Next perihelion: Ejection trajectory (assumed)

Physical characteristics
- Mean diameter: ~100 km (62 mi)
- Comet total magnitude (M1): –3.0
- Apparent magnitude: 3–4 (1729 apparition)

The Comet of 1729, also known as C/1729 P1 or Comet Sarabat, was an assumed parabolic comet with an absolute magnitude of −3, possibly the brightest ever observed for a comet; (Note: Caesar's Comet (C/-43 K1) has, however, been calculated to have possibly had the brightest absolute magnitude in recorded history: −3.3 at the time of discovery and −4.0 during a later flare-up.) it is therefore considered to be potentially the largest comet ever seen. With an assumed eccentricity of 1, it is unknown if this comet will return in a hundred thousand years or be ejected from the Solar System.

== Discovery ==
The comet was discovered in the constellation of Equuleus by Father Nicolas Sarabat, a professor of mathematics, at Nîmes in the early morning of August 1, 1729. At the time of discovery the comet was making its closest approach to Earth at a distance of 3.1 AU (460 million km; 290 million mi) and had a solar elongation of 155 degrees.

Observing with the naked eye, he saw an object resembling a faint, nebulous star: he was at first unsure if it was a comet or part of the Milky Way. Moonlight interfered with Sarabat's observations until August 9, but after recovering the object and attempting to detect its motion without the aid of any measuring instruments, he became convinced that he had found a new comet.

News of the discovery was passed to Jacques Cassini in Paris. He was able to confirm the comet's position, though with extreme surprise at how little it had moved since the first observation nearly a month previously. Cassini was able to continue observation until 18 January 1730, by which time the comet was located in Vulpecula. This was an extraordinarily long period for observation of a comet, though it never rose above apparent magnitude 3–4, about the brightness of the Andromeda Galaxy.

== Orbit ==
The comet's orbit, later computed by John Russell Hind, showed a perihelion distance (closest approach to the Sun) of 4.05 AU (606 million km), which is just within the orbit of Jupiter. However, despite this it became visible (although faintly) to the naked eye, and indeed remained visible for six months in total. This suggests that its absolute magnitude or intrinsic brightness was unusually high, possibly as high as −3.0. It is therefore likely that the Comet of 1729 was an exceptionally large object, with a cometary nucleus on the order of 100 km (62 mi) in diameter. The JPL small-body database only uses three observations, a two-body model, and an assumed epoch to compute the orbit of this assumed parabolic comet. With such a limited dataset, undefined uncertainties, and an assumed eccentricity of 1, (that is, a parabolic trajectory) it is unknown if the comet will return on the order of 100,000 years or be ejected from the Solar System.
