= Milton L. Humason =

American astronomer

Milton La Salle Humason
- Born: August 19, 1891; Dodge Center, Minnesota, U.S.
- Died: June 18, 1972 (aged 80); Mendocino, California, U.S.
- Scientific career
- Fields: Astronomy
- Workplaces: Mount Wilson Observatory

Milton La Salle Humason (August 19, 1891 – June 18, 1972) was an American astronomer. He worked with Edwin Hubble to measure the redshift of nebulas in the early 20th century, providing evidence of the expansion of the universe.

== Biography ==
Milton Humason was born in Dodge Center, Minnesota.

Humason dropped out of school and had no formal education past the age of 14. Because he loved the mountains, and Mount Wilson in particular, he became a "mule skinner" taking materials and equipment up the mountain while Mount Wilson Observatory was being built. In 1917, after a short stint on a ranch in La Verne, he became a janitor at the observatory. Out of sheer interest, he volunteered to be a night assistant at the observatory. His technical skill and quiet manner made him a favorite on the mountain. Recognizing his talent, in 1919, George Ellery Hale made him a Mt. Wilson staff member. This was unprecedented, as Humason did not have a Ph.D., or even a high school diploma. He soon proved Hale's judgment correct, as he made several key observational discoveries. He became known as a meticulous observer, obtaining photographs and difficult spectrograms of faint galaxies. His observations played a major role in the development of physical cosmology, including assisting Edwin Hubble in formulating Hubble's law. In 1950 he earned a D.Sc. from Lund University. He retired in 1957.

He discovered Comet C/1961 R1 (Humason), notable for its large perihelion distance.

Due to merest chance, Humason missed discovering Pluto. Eleven years before Clyde Tombaugh, Humason took a set of four photographs in which the image of Pluto appeared. There is persistent speculation that he missed discovering the dwarf planet because it fell on a defect in the photographic plate. This is unlikely, however, given that it appeared in four separate photographs over three different nights.

Much of the work Humason performed was actually credited to Hubble, the two of whom worked together for many years.

He died in Mendocino, California.

== In popular culture ==
In the popular documentary Cosmos: A Personal Voyage by astronomer Carl Sagan, Humason's life and work are portrayed on screen in episode 10: The Edge of Forever.

Humason was also the inspiration for the Big Dipper song "Humason," which appeared on the Boston group's 1987 album Heavens.

== Honors ==
- The crater Humason on the Moon is named after him as are "Humason-Zwicky stars".

== Cited sources ==
- Ventrudo, Brian (May 19, 2010). "How a janitor at the Mount Wilson Observatory measured the size of the universe". The Christian Science Monitor.
