= Comet nucleus =

Central part of a comet

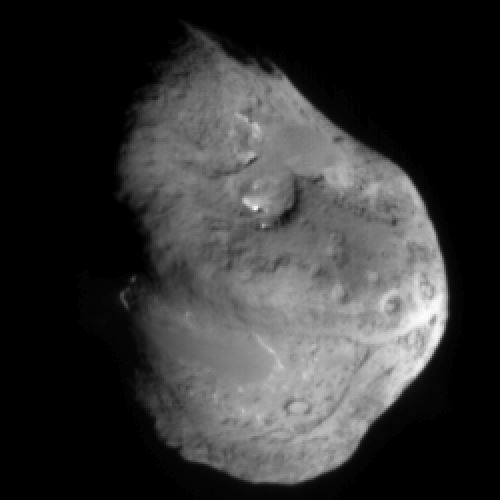
The nucleus of Comet Tempel 1

The comet nucleus is the solid, central part of a comet. A cometary nucleus is composed of rock, dust, and frozen gases. When heated by the Sun, the gases sublime and produce an atmosphere surrounding the nucleus known as the coma. The force exerted on the coma by the Sun's radiation pressure and solar wind cause an enormous tail to form, which points away from the Sun. A typical comet nucleus has an albedo of 0.04. This is blacker than coal, and may be caused by a covering of dust.

Results from the Rosetta and Philae spacecraft show that the nucleus of 67P/Churyumov–Gerasimenko has no magnetic field, which suggests that magnetism may not have played a role in the early formation of planetesimals. Further, the ALICE spectrograph on Rosetta determined that electrons (within 1 km (0.62 mi) above the comet nucleus) produced from photoionization of water molecules by solar radiation, and not photons from the Sun as thought earlier, are responsible for the degradation of water and carbon dioxide molecules released from the comet nucleus into its coma.

== Paradigms ==
Comet nuclei, at ~1 km to at times tens of kilometers, could not be resolved by telescopes. Even current giant telescopes would give just a few pixels on target, assuming nuclei were not obscured by comae when near Earth. An understanding of the nucleus, versus the phenomenon of the coma, had to be deduced, from multiple lines of evidence.

=== "Flying sandbank" ===
The "flying sandbank" model, first proposed in the late-1800s, posits a comet as a swarm of bodies, not a discrete object at all. Activity is the loss of both volatiles, and population members. This model was championed in midcentury by Raymond Lyttleton, along with an origin. As the Sun passed through interstellar nebulosity, material would clump in wake eddies. Some would be lost, but some would remain in heliocentric orbits. The weak capture explained long, eccentric, inclined comet orbits. Ices per se were lacking; volatiles were stored by adsorption on grains.

=== "Dirty snowball" ===
Beginning in the 1950s, Fred Lawrence Whipple published his "icy conglomerate" model. This was soon popularized as "dirty snowball." Comet orbits had been determined quite precisely, yet comets were at times recovered "off-schedule," by as much as days. Early comets could be explained by a "resisting medium"—such as "the aether", or the cumulative action of meteoroids against the front of the comet(s). But comets could return both early and late. Whipple argued that a gentle thrust from asymmetric emissions (now "nongravitational forces") better explained comet timing. This required that the emitter have cohesive strength – a single, solid nucleus with some proportion of volatiles. Lyttleton continued publishing flying-sandbank works as late as 1972. The death knell for the flying sandbank was Halley's Comet. Vega 2 and Giotto images showed a single body, emitting through a small number of jets.

=== "Icy dirtball" ===
It has been a long time since comet nuclei could be imagined as frozen snowballs. Whipple had already postulated a separate crust and interior. Before Halley's 1986 apparition, it appeared that an exposed ice surface would have some finite lifetime, even behind a coma. Halley's nucleus was predicted to be dark, not bright, due to preferential destruction/escape of gases, and retention of refractories. The term dust mantling has been in common use for more than 35 years.

The Halley results exceeded even these—comets are not merely dark, but among the darkest objects in the Solar System. Furthermore, prior dust estimates were severe undercounts. Both finer grains and larger pebbles appeared in spacecraft detectors, but not ground telescopes. The volatile fraction also included organics, not merely water and other gases. Dust-ice ratios appeared much closer than thought. Extremely low densities (0.1 to 0.5 g cm^{3}) were derived. The nucleus was still assumed to be majority-ice, perhaps overwhelmingly so.

=== Modern theory ===
Densities were confirmed as quite low, ~0.6 g cm^{3}. Comets were highly porous, and fragile on micro- and macro-scales.

Refractory-to-ice ratios are much higher, at least 3:1, possibly ~5:1, ~6:1, or more.

This is a full reversal from the dirty snowball model. The Rosetta science team has coined the term "mineral organices," for minerals and organics with a minor fraction of ices.

Manx comets, Damocloids, and active asteroids demonstrate that there may be no bright line separating comets and asteroids.

== Origin ==
Comets, or their precursors, formed in the outer Solar System, possibly millions of years before planet formation. How and when comets formed is debated, with distinct implications for Solar System formation, dynamics, and geology. Three-dimensional computer simulations indicate the major structural features observed on cometary nuclei can be explained by pairwise low velocity accretion of weak cometesimals. The currently favored creation mechanism is that of the nebular hypothesis, which states that comets are probably a remnant of the original planetesimal "building blocks" from which the planets grew.

Astronomers think that comets originate in the Oort cloud, the scattered disk, and the outer Main Belt.

== Size ==
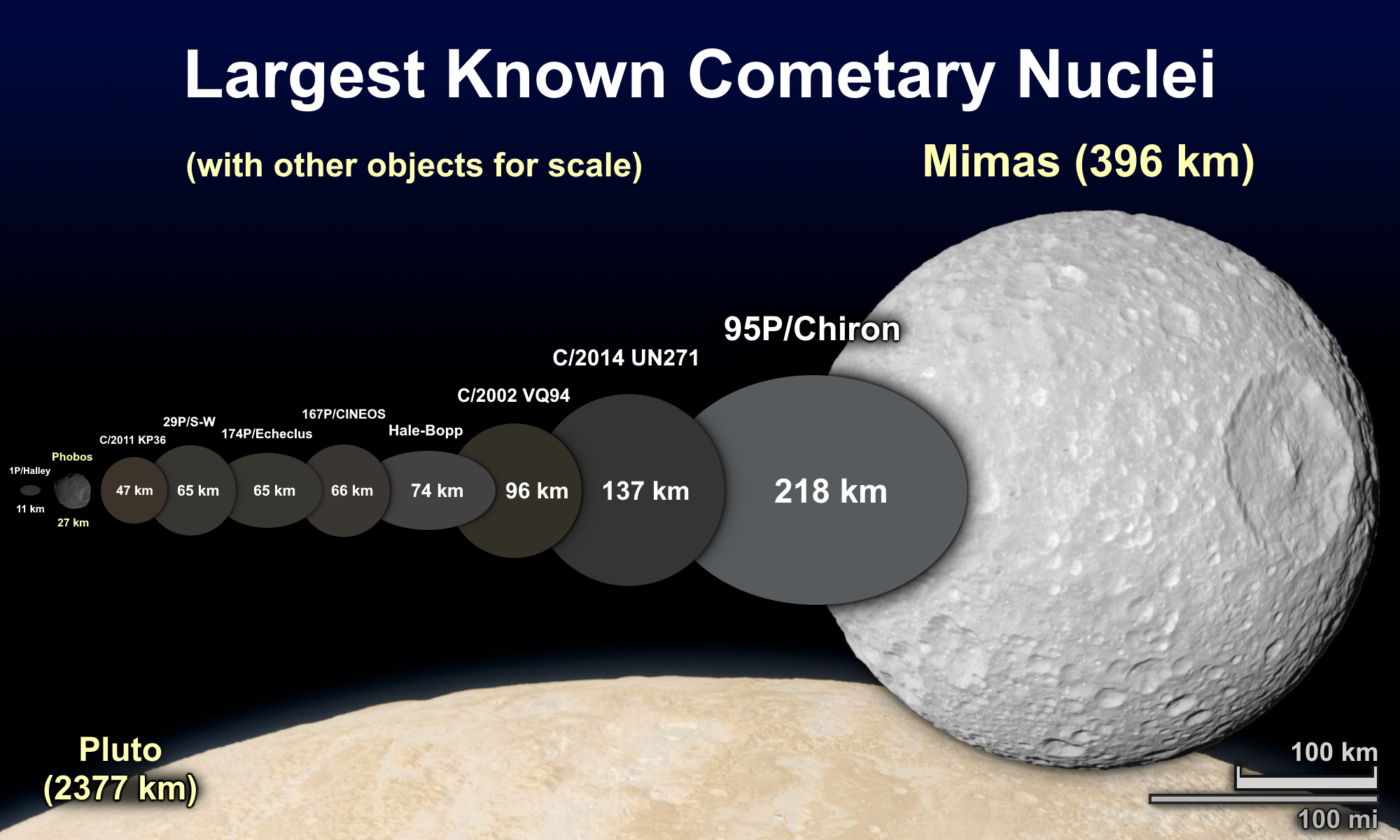
Size and color comparison of the largest known comets, including dwarf planet Pluto and natural satellites Mimas and Phobos for scale

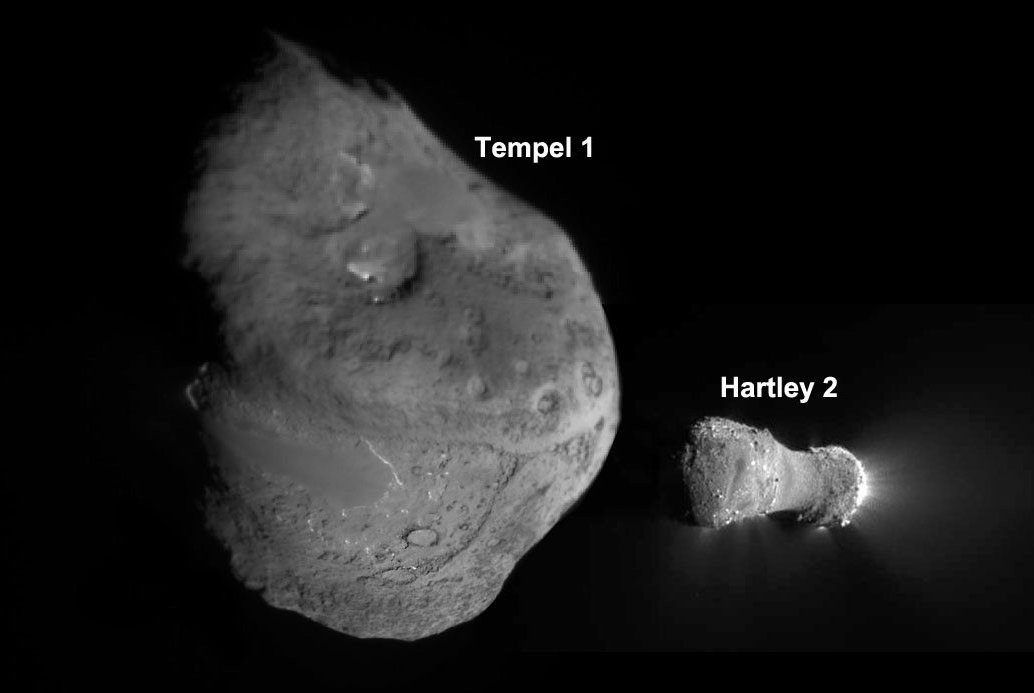
Tempel 1 and Hartley 2 compared

Most cometary nuclei are thought to be no more than about 16 kilometers (10 miles) across. The largest comets that have come inside the orbit of Saturn are 95P/Chiron (≈200 km), C/2002 VQ94 (LINEAR) (≈100 km), Comet of 1729 (≈100 km), Hale–Bopp (≈60 km), 29P (≈60 km), 109P/Swift–Tuttle (≈26 km), and 28P/Neujmin (≈21 km).

The potato-shaped nucleus of Halley's Comet (15 × 8 × 8 km) contains equal amounts of ice and dust.

During a flyby in September 2001, the Deep Space 1 spacecraft observed the nucleus of Comet Borrelly and found it to be about half the size (8×4×4 km) of the nucleus of Halley's Comet. Borrelly's nucleus was also potato-shaped and had a dark black surface. Like Halley's Comet, Comet Borrelly only released gas from small areas where holes in the crust exposed the ice to sunlight.

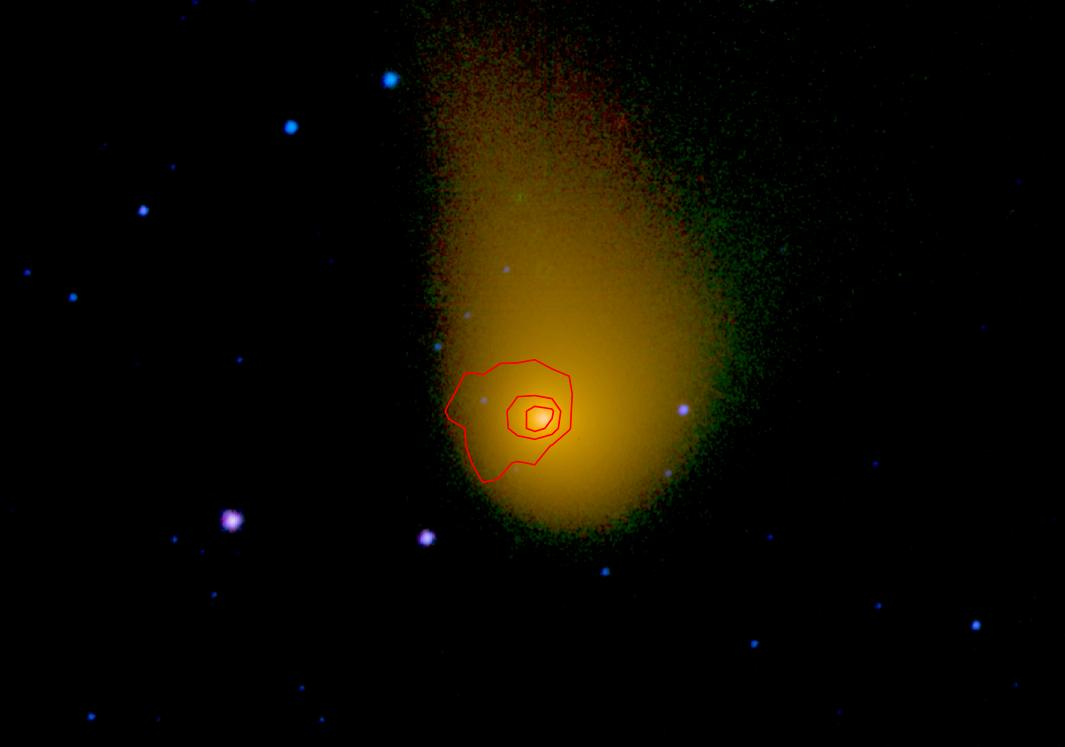
C/2006 W3 (Christensen) – emitting carbon gas

The nucleus of comet Hale–Bopp was estimated to be 60 ± 20 km in diameter. Hale-Bopp appeared bright to the unaided eye because its unusually large nucleus gave off a great deal of dust and gas.

The nucleus of P/2007 R5 is probably only 100–200 meters in diameter.

The largest centaurs (unstable, planet crossing, icy asteroids) are estimated to be 250 km to 300 km in diameter. Three of the largest would include 10199 Chariklo (258 km), 2060 Chiron (230 km), and (523727) 2014 NW65 (≈220 km).

Known comets have been estimated to have an average density of 0.6 g/cm^{3}. Below is a list of comets that have had estimated sizes, densities, and masses.

Name	Dimensions km	Density g/cm^{3}	Mass kg
Halley's Comet	15 × 8 × 8	0.6	3×10^{14}
Tempel 1	7.6×4.9	0.62	7.9×10^{13}
19P/Borrelly	8×4×4	0.3	2×10^{13}
81P/Wild	5.5×4.0×3.3	0.6	2.3×10^{13}
67P/Churyumov–Gerasimenko	See article on 67P	0.4	(1.0±0.1)×10^{13}

== Composition ==
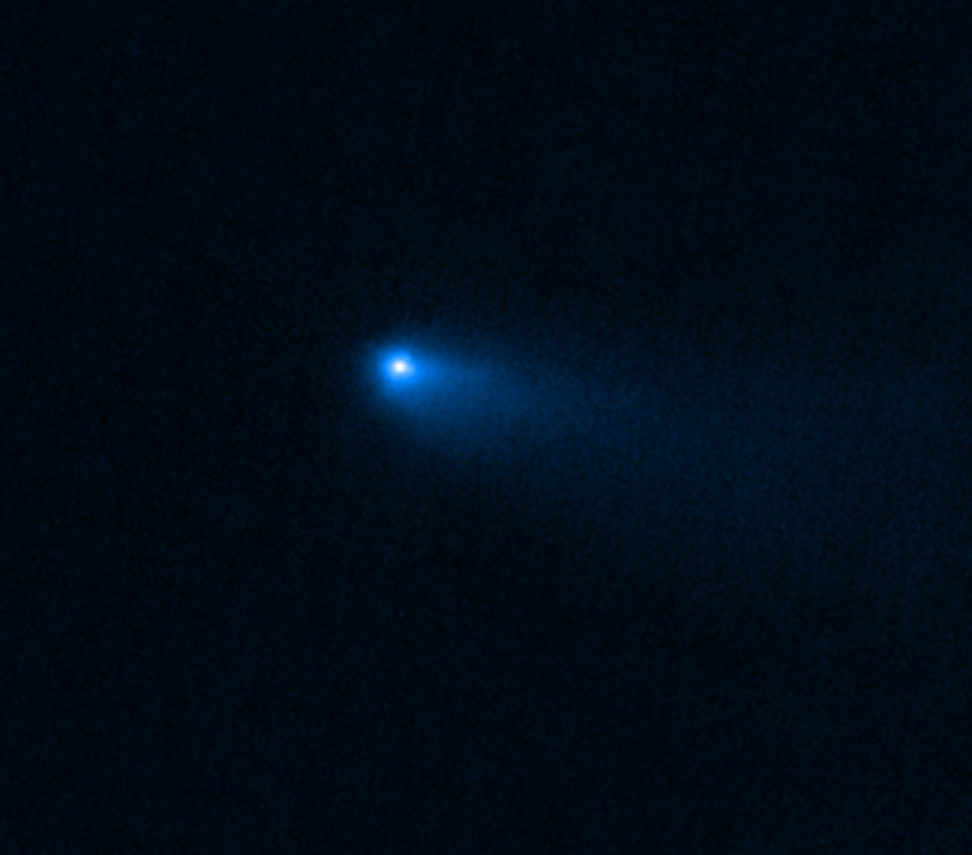
James Webb Space Telescope image of Comet Read, the first comet in the main asteroid belt to have water vapor detected around it. Unlike most comets, Comet Read has no detectable carbon dioxide.

It was once thought that water-ice was the predominant constituent of the nucleus. In the dirty snowball model, dust is ejected when the ice retreats. Based on this, about 80% of the Halley's Comet nucleus would be water-ice, and frozen carbon monoxide (CO) makes up another 15%. Much of the remainder is frozen carbon dioxide, methane, and ammonia. Scientists think that other comets are chemically similar to Halley's Comet. The nucleus of Halley's Comet is also an extremely dark black. Scientists think that the surface of the comet, and perhaps most other comets, is covered with a black crust of dust and rock that covers most of the ice. These comets release gas only when holes in this crust rotate toward the Sun, exposing the interior ice to the warming sunlight.

This assumption was shown to be naive, starting at Halley. Coma composition does not represent nucleus composition, as activity selects for volatiles, and against refractories, including heavy organic fractions. Our understanding has evolved more toward mostly rock; recent estimates show that water is perhaps only 20-30% of the mass in typical nuclei. Instead, comets are predominantly organic materials and minerals. Data from Churyumov–Gerasimenko and Arrokoth, and laboratory experiments on accretion, suggest refractories-to-ices ratios less than 1 may not be possible.

The composition of water vapor from Churyumov–Gerasimenko comet, as determined by the Rosetta mission, is substantially different from that found on Earth. The ratio of deuterium to hydrogen in the water from the comet was determined to be three times that found for terrestrial water. This makes it unlikely that water on Earth came from comets such as Churyumov–Gerasimenko.

=== Organics ===
Rosetta found that around 40% of Churyumov–Gerasimenko nucleus is organic molecules. Philae spacecraft, that landed on comet Churyumov–Gerasimenko in November 2014, detected at least 16 organic compounds, of which four (including acetamide, acetone, methyl isocyanate and propionaldehyde) were detected for the first time on a comet.

== Structure ==
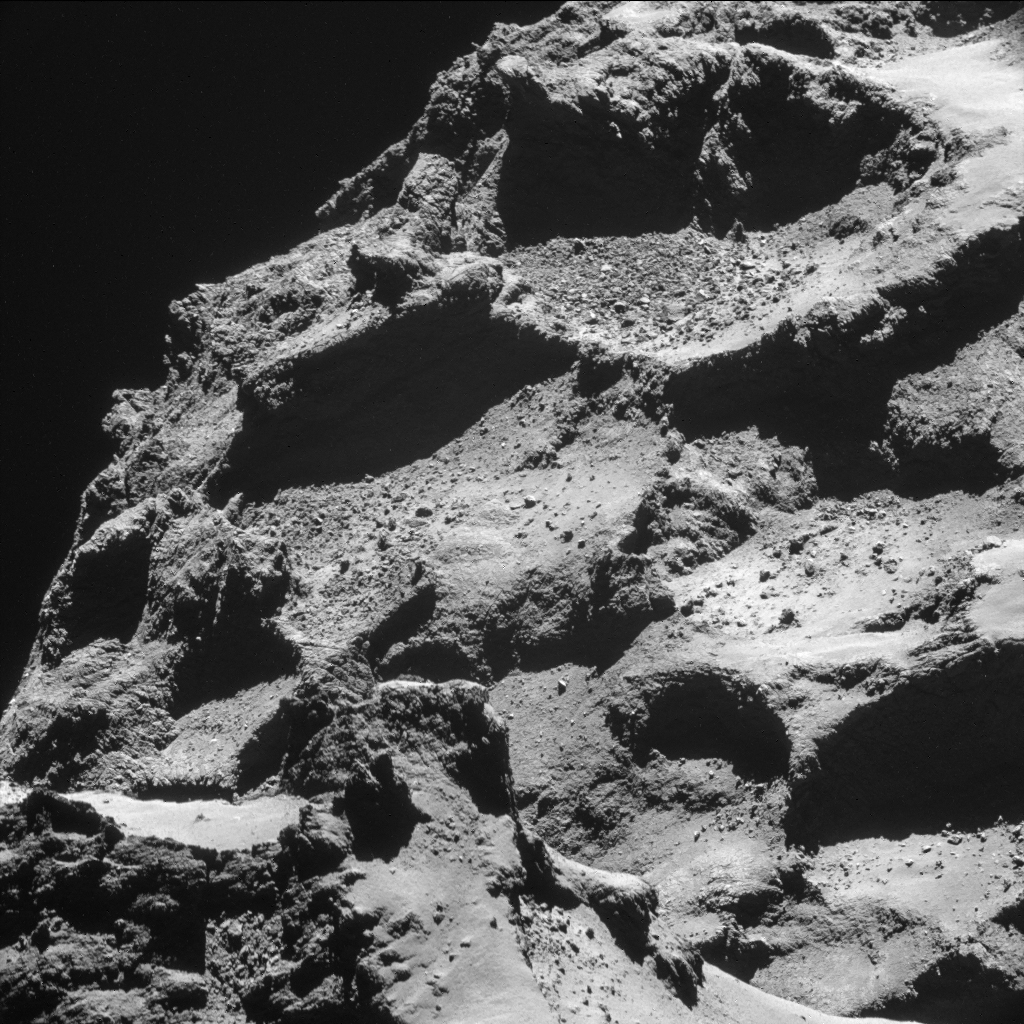
Surface of the nucleus of Comet 67P from 10 km away as seen by Rosetta spacecraft

On 67P/Churyumov–Gerasimenko comet, some of the resulting water vapour may escape from the nucleus, but 80% of it recondenses in layers beneath the surface. This observation implies that the thin ice-rich layers exposed close to the surface may be a consequence of cometary activity and evolution, and that global layering does not necessarily occur early in the comet's formation history.

Fragment B of Comet 73P/Schwassmann–Wachmann 3 disintegrating, as seen by the Hubble Space Telescope

Measurements carried out by the Philae lander on 67P/Churyumov–Gerasimenko comet, indicate that the dust layer could be as much as 20 cm (7.9 in) thick. Beneath that is hard ice, or a mixture of ice and dust. Porosity appears to increase toward the center of the comet. While most scientists thought that all the evidence indicated that the structure of nuclei of comets is processed rubble piles of smaller ice planetesimals of a previous generation, the results of Rosetta mission show that not all cometary nucleus are "rubble piles". Data were not conclusive concerning the collisional environment during the formation and right afterwards.

=== Splitting ===
The nucleus of some comets may be fragile, a conclusion supported by the observation of comets splitting apart. Splitting comets include 3D/Biela in 1846, Shoemaker–Levy 9 in 1992, and 73P/Schwassmann–Wachmann from 1995 to 2006. Greek historian Ephorus reported that a comet split apart as far back as the winter of 372–373 BC. Comets are suspected of splitting due to thermal stress, internal gas pressure, or impact.

Comets 42P/Neujmin and 53P/Van Biesbroeck appear to be fragments of a parent comet. Numerical integrations have shown that both comets had a rather close approach to Jupiter in January 1850, and that, before 1850, the two orbits were nearly identical.

== Albedo ==
Cometary nuclei are among the darkest objects known to exist in the Solar System. The Giotto probe found that Comet Halley's nucleus reflects approximately 4% of the light that falls on it, and Deep Space 1 discovered that Comet Borrelly's surface reflects only 2.5–3.0% of the light that falls on it; by comparison, fresh asphalt reflects 7% of the light that falls on it. It is thought that complex organic compounds are the dark surface material. Solar heating drives off volatile compounds leaving behind heavy long-chain organics that tend to be very dark, like tar or crude oil. The very darkness of cometary surfaces allows them to absorb the heat necessary to drive their outgassing.

Roughly six percent of the near-Earth asteroids are thought to be extinct nuclei of comets (see Extinct comets) which no longer experience outgassing. Two near-Earth asteroids with albedos this low include 14827 Hypnos and 3552 Don Quixote.

== Discovery and exploration ==
The first relatively close mission to a comet nucleus was space probe Giotto. This was the first time a nucleus was imaged at such proximity, coming as near as 596 km. The data was a revelation, showing for the first time the jets, the low-albedo surface, and organic compounds.

During its flyby, Giotto was hit at least 12,000 times by particles, including a 1-gram fragment that caused a temporary loss of communication with Darmstadt. Halley was calculated to be ejecting three tonnes of material per second from seven jets, causing it to wobble over long time periods. Comet Grigg–Skjellerup's nucleus was visited after Halley, with Giotto approaching 100–200 km.

Results from the Rosetta and Philae spacecraft show that the nucleus of 67P/Churyumov–Gerasimenko has no magnetic field, which suggests that magnetism may not have played a role in the early formation of planetesimals. Further, the ALICE spectrograph on Rosetta determined that electrons (within 1 km (0.62 mi) above the comet nucleus) produced from photoionization of water molecules by solar radiation, and not photons from the Sun as thought earlier, are responsible for the degradation of water and carbon dioxide molecules released from the comet nucleus into its coma.

Tempel 1 Deep Impact	Tempel 1 Stardust	Borrelly; Deep Space 1	Wild 2 Stardust	Hartley 2 Deep Impact	C–G; Rosetta

Comets already visited are:

- Halley's Comet
- 26P/Grigg–Skjellerup
- Tempel 1 (also hit with impactor)
- 19P/Borrelly
- 81P/Wild
- 103P/Hartley
- C/2013 A1 (Siding Spring) – unplanned encounter with Mars spacecraft
- 67P/Churyumov–Gerasimenko (also landed on)

== See also ==
- Coma (cometary)
- Hypatia (stone)
- List of comets visited by spacecraft
