= C/2010 U3 (Boattini) =

Oort cloud comet

Discovery
- Discovered by: Andrea Boattini
- Discovery site: Mount Lemmon Survey
- Discovery date: 31 October 2010

Orbital characteristics
- Epoch: 18 June 2017 (JD 2457922.5)
- Observation arc: 17.44 years
- Earliest precovery date: 5 November 2005
- Number of observations: 4,354
- Orbit type: Oort cloud
- Aphelion: ~34,000 AU (inbound); ~9,900 AU (outbound)
- Perihelion: 8.446 AU
- Eccentricity: 0.99950 (inbound); 0.982 (outbound)
- Orbital period: ~2.2 million years (inbound); ~350,000 years (outbound)
- Inclination: 55.512°
- Longitude of ascending node: 43.073°
- Argument of periapsis: 88.065°
- Mean anomaly: -0.001°
- Last perihelion: 26 February 2019
- T_{Jupiter}: 2.048
- Earth MOID: 7.929 AU
- Jupiter MOID: 6.326 AU

Physical characteristics
- Mean radius: ≥ 0.1 km (0.062 mi)
- Spectral type: (B–V) = 0.82±0.05; (V–R) = 0.48±0.04; (R–I) = 0.32±0.05; (B–R) = 1.30±0.06
- Comet total magnitude (M1): 6.3
- Comet nuclear magnitude (M2): 8.3

C/2010 U3 (Boattini) is the parabolic comet with the longest observation arc and took around a million years to complete half an orbit from its furthest distance in the Oort cloud. It was discovered on 31 October 2010 by Andrea Boattini in images taken with the Mount Lemmon Survey's 1.5-m reflector. Its perihelion distance is outside of the inner Solar System.

== Orbit ==
The comet has an observation arc of 17.44 years allowing a very good estimate of the inbound (original) and outbound (future) orbits. The orbit of a long-period comet is properly obtained when the osculating orbit is computed at an epoch after leaving the planetary region and is calculated with respect to the center of mass of the Solar System. Inbound JPL Horizons shows an epoch 1950 barycentric orbital period of 2.2 millions years with aphelion of 34,000 AU (0.5 ly) from the Sun. Hui et al 2019 has a similar inbound orbital period of 2 million years. Outbound with an epoch of 2050 JPL Horizons shows a period of approximately 350,000 years and an aphelion distance of 9,900 AU (0.2 ly).

The generic JPL Small-Body Database browser uses a near-perihelion epoch of 2017-Jun-01 which is before the comet left the planetary region and makes the highly eccentric aphelion point inaccurate since it does not account for any planetary perturbations after that epoch. The heliocentric JPL Small-Body Database solution also does not account for the combined mass of the Sun+Jupiter.

Precovery images from November 2005 when the comet was active 25.8 AU (3.86 billion km) from the Sun are known. The comet was seen to outburst in 2009 and 2017. The coma and tail consist of dust grains about 20 μm in diameter ejected at less than 50 meters per second (110 miles per hour). Supervolatiles such as CO and CO_{2} can generate activity when a comet is this far from the Sun.
