= P/1999 J6 (SOHO) =

Marsden sungrazer comet

Discovery
- Discovered by: SOHO; Mike Oates

Designations
- MPC designation: C/1999 J6; C/2004 V9; C/2010 H3

Orbital characteristics
- Epoch: 2007-Jan-19
- Observation arc: 10.95 Years
- Number of observations: 267
- Aphelion: 6.15 AU
- Perihelion: 0.049 AU
- Semi-major axis: 3.10 AU
- Eccentricity: 0.984
- Orbital period: 5.46 years
- Max. orbital speed: 200 km/s (2026) (Note: v = 42.1219 √1/r − 0.5/a, where r is the distance from the Sun, and a is the major semi-axis.)
- Inclination: 26.6
- Next perihelion: 2026-Jun-18?
- T_{Jupiter}: 1.923
- Earth MOID: 0.0099 AU (1,480,000 km; 3.9 LD)

P/1999 J6 (SOHO) is a small comet, notable for being among those that made a close approach to the Earth. It is next expected to come to perihelion (closest approach to the Sun) in June 2026 at 0.044 AU (6.6 million km).

The most notable Earth approach was on June 12, 1999 when it passed between 357,000 km (222,000 mi) to 3.3 million kilometres (2,100,000 mi) from Earth. The uncertainty is a result of the large number of observations at roughly the same time as there were around 50 observations on April 19, 2010. The discovery was made on March 20, 2000, during a review of previously captured images.

It next came to perihelion in November 2004, when it was known as "C/2004 V9", and then on April 19, 2010 when it was known as "C/2010 H3". On August 15, 2015 it should have been 0.56 AU from Earth.

The comet's return was successfully observed in early June 2026 by CCOR-1 coronograph and LASCO.

== See also ==
- 55P/Tempel–Tuttle
- 109P/Swift–Tuttle
- 460P/PANSTARRS
- D/1770 L1 (Lexell)
- C/1983 H1 (IRAS–Araki–Alcock)
