= C/1983 H1 (IRAS–Araki–Alcock) =

Long-period comet

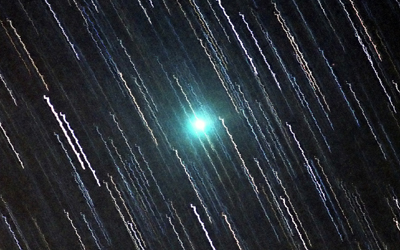
- Comet IRAS–Araki–Alcock photographed by Russell E. Milton on 11 May 1983

Discovery
- Discovered by: IRAS; George E. D. Alcock; Genichi Araki
- Discovery date: 25 April 1983

Designations
- Alternative designations: 1983d 1983 VII

Orbital characteristics
- Epoch: 13 May 1983 (JD 2445467.5)
- Observation arc: 160 days
- Number of observations: 347
- Aphelion: 195.08 AU
- Perihelion: 0.9913 AU
- Semi-major axis: 98.034 AU
- Eccentricity: 0.98989
- Orbital period: 970.49 years
- Inclination: 73.251°
- Longitude of ascending node: 49.102°
- Argument of periapsis: 192.85°
- Last perihelion: 21 May 1983
- T_{Jupiter}: 0.408
- Earth MOID: 0.0058 AU
- Jupiter MOID: 3.0838 AU

Physical characteristics
- Dimensions: 9.2 km (5.7 mi)
- Mean density: 0.45 g/cm^{3}
- Synodic rotation period: 51.3±0.3 hours
- Geometric albedo: 0.02
- Comet total magnitude (M1): 12.6
- Apparent magnitude: 3–4 (1983 apparition)

Comet IRAS–Araki–Alcock (formal designation C/1983 H1, formerly 1983 VII) is a long-period comet that, in 1983, made the closest known approach to Earth of any comet in the last 200 years, at a distance of about 0.0312 AU (4.67 million km; 2.90 million mi).

== Discovery and observations ==
The comet was named after its discoverers – the Infrared Astronomical Satellite and two amateur astronomers, George Alcock of the United Kingdom and Genichi Araki of Japan. Both men were schoolteachers by profession, although Alcock was retired. Alcock had made his discovery simply by observing through the window of his home, using binoculars. During the closest approach, the comet appeared as a circular cloud about the size of the full moon, having no discernible tail, and shining at a naked eye magnitude of 3–4. It swept across the sky at an angular speed of about 30 degrees per day. On 11 May, the comet was detected on radar by Arecibo Observatory and Goldstone Solar System Radar making it the first comet detected by two different radar systems. A second detection was made by Goldstone on 14 May.

It is a long-period comet, with an orbital period of about 970 years, and is the parent comet of the minor Eta Lyrid meteor shower. This shower's radiant lies between Vega and Cygnus and produces 1 or 2 meteors an hour in mid-May with a peak between 9 May and 11 May.

== Flyby ==
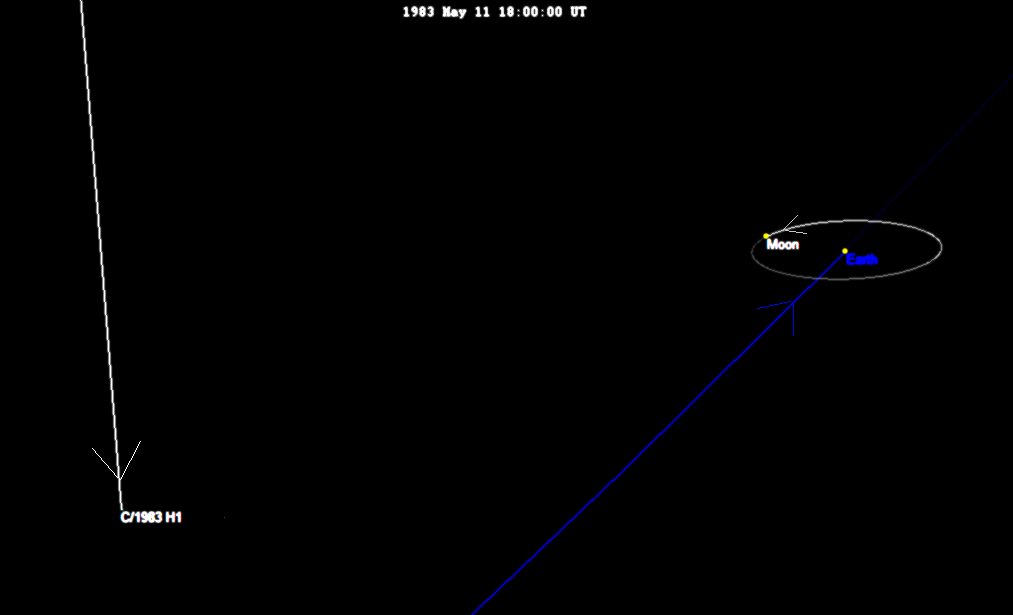
Moving north to south, it crossed just inside the Earth's orbit on 11 May.

Comet IRAS–Araki–Alcock made its closest approach to Earth in 1983, at a distance of about 0.0312 AU (4.67 million km; 2.90 million mi). It was the closest approach up to that time of any comet in the last 200 years; only Lexell's Comet (1770) and 55P/Tempel–Tuttle (1366) are thought to have come closer. Subsequently, on 12 June 1999, the small comet P/1999 J6 (SOHO) passed about 0.012 AU (1.8 million km; 1.1 million mi) from Earth. What was thought to be a small fragment of 252P/LINEAR, 460P/PanSTARRS, passed at a distance of 0.0237 AU (3.55 million km; 2.20 million mi) on 22 March 2016.

== Gallery ==
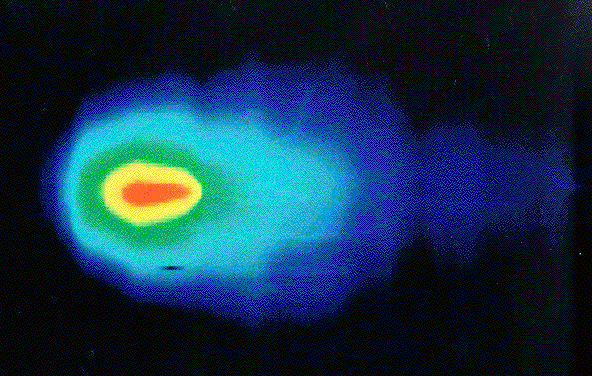
A false colour image of Comet IRAS–Araki–Alcock in 1983, viewed in infrared light by the Infrared Astronomical Satellite (IRAS)

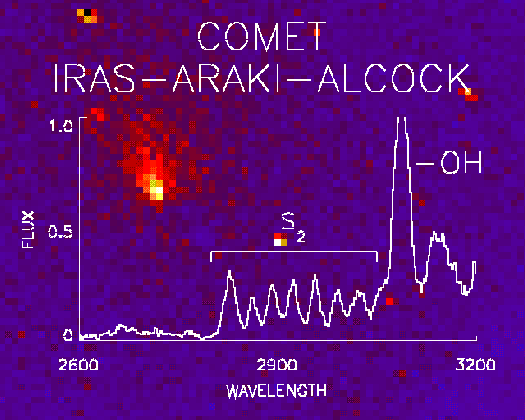
This figure combines an International Ultraviolet Explorer FES image showing its diffuse tail, and the long-wavelength redundant (LWR) spectrum depicting the molecular emission lines of sulfur (S_{2}) and hydroxyl (OH)

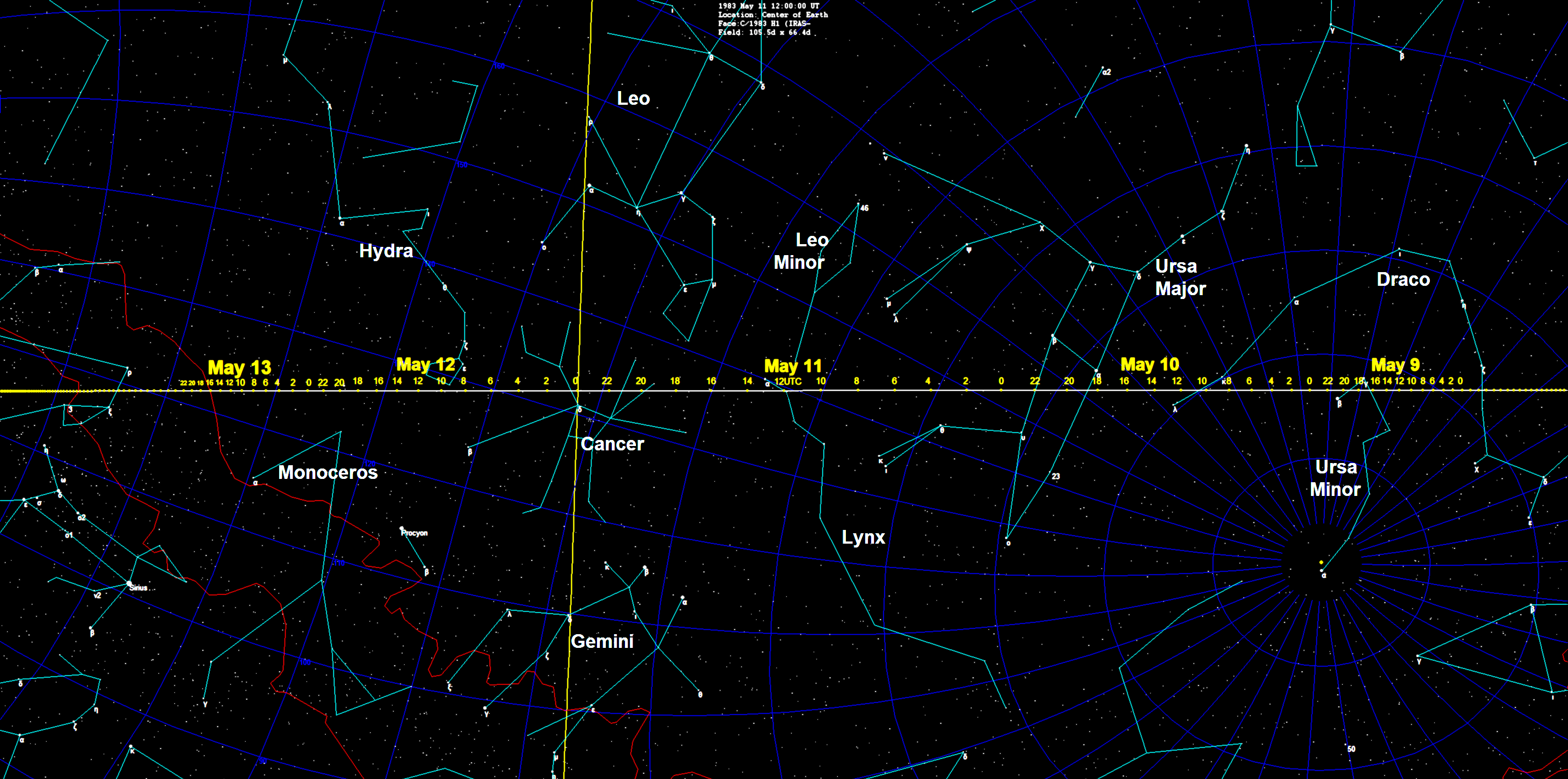
The comet passed from north to south between 9 May to 13 May, passing through Ursa Major towards Cancer. Its motion is marked every 2 hours here.

== See also ==
- C/1983 J1 (Sugano–Saigusa–Fujikawa) – another comet which passed close to Earth in 1983
