= 252P/LINEAR =

Jupiter-family comet

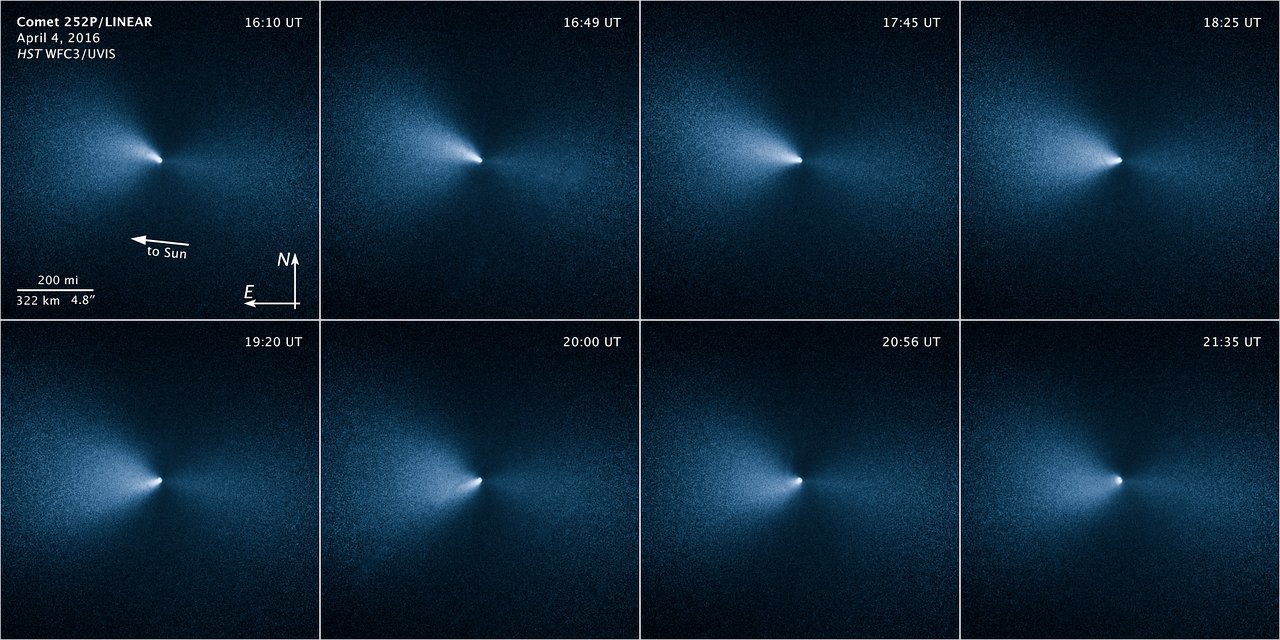
- Sequence of images shows Comet 252P/LINEAR near Earth taken by Hubble.

Discovery
- Discovery site: LINEAR
- Discovery date: 7 April 2000

Designations
- MPC designation: P/2000 G1, P/2011 L5
- Alternative designations: LINEAR 12; PK11L050

Orbital characteristics
- Epoch: 5 July 2021 (JD 2459400.5)
- Observation arc: 21.39 years (Note: Observation arc from the Minor Planet Center database covering dates from 7 April 2000 until 29 August 2021.)
- Number of observations: 1,889
- Aphelion: 5.099 AU
- Perihelion: 1.000 AU
- Semi-major axis: 3.049 AU
- Eccentricity: 0.67197
- Orbital period: 5.327 years
- Inclination: 10.409°
- Longitude of ascending node: 190.95°
- Argument of periapsis: 343.30°
- Mean anomaly: 358.83°
- Last perihelion: 11 July 2021
- Next perihelion: 7 November 2026
- T_{Jupiter}: 2.821
- Earth MOID: 0.012 AU
- Jupiter MOID: 0.201 AU

Physical characteristics
- Mean radius: 0.3±0.03 km
- Mean density: 430±70 kg/m^{3}
- Synodic rotation period: 7.35±0.05 hours
- Comet total magnitude (M1): 16.4
- Comet nuclear magnitude (M2): 22.7±0.9

Comet 252P/LINEAR is a Jupiter-family comet and near-Earth object discovered by the Lincoln Near-Earth Asteroid Research (LINEAR) survey on 7 April 2000.

At some point, 252P/LINEAR separated from a second object designated 460P/PanSTARRS, that was discovered in January 2016. The nucleus of 460P/PanSTARRS is 1 km (0.62 mi) wide, which is larger than the nucleus of 252P, which is estimated to be 600 m (2,000 ft) across, but it is less active. 252P/LINEAR approached as close as 0.0356 AU (5.33 million km) to Earth on 21 March 2016.

== Observational history ==
The comet was discovered on 7 April 2000 by the Lincoln Near-Earth Asteroid Research with a 1.0 m f/2.15 reflector telescope as a fast moving object. Lisa Brown-Manguso noticed that it had a diffuse tail, indicating it is a comet. Upon discovery the comet had a magnitude of 17–18. After additional observations a short period orbit was calculated, indicating that the comet had an orbital of 5.4 years and perihelion at 1.00293 AU. During the 2000 apparition the comet approached to 0.10 AU from Earth. The comet was recovered on 9 June 2011 by Spacewatch Project at Kitt Peak Observatory, Arizona. Its apparent magnitude was estimated to be 22.7.

The 2016 apparition was very favorable, as the comet passed 0.0356 AU (5.33 million km) from Earth on 21 March 2016. That is the fifth closest comet approach to Earth. The comet during that apparition was more active than predicted, reached an apparent magnitude of 4.5 and became faintly visible by naked eye. It was observed by Hubble Space Telescope on 4 April 2016, and thus became the closest celestial object Hubble has observed, other than the Moon. The images revealed a narrow, well-defined jet of dust ejected by the icy comet nucleus.

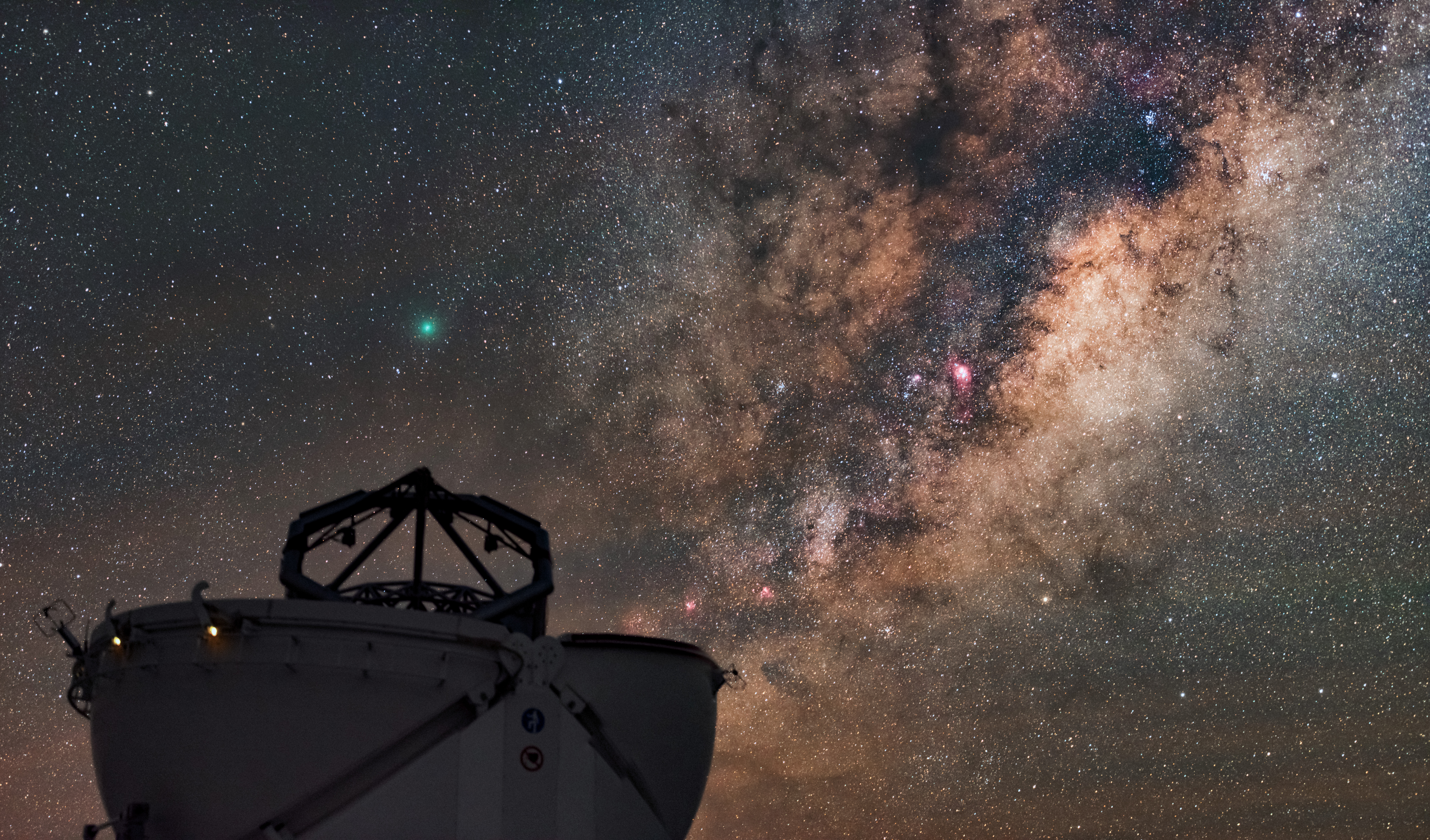
The comet during the 2016 apparition above an auxiliary telescope of ESO's Very Large Telescope.

During the 2021 apparition the comet was again brighter than expected. On 8 August the visual magnitude of the comet was estimated to be about 10.5, while on 10 August the magnitude was estimated to be 13.1 based on CCD photometry and the coma was measuring 3.6 arcminutes across, while no tail was detected.

== Orbit ==
The comet is an Earth-Jupiter family comet, meaning that it passes quite close to both Earth and Jupiter. This causes its orbit to be perturbed frequently on an astronomical timescale. The inclination is 10.4°, the orbital period 5.33 years for epoch July 2021 and its perihelion is at 1.0005 AU. For epoch November 2026 the perihelion will be 1.0037 AU.

The nominal orbit of 252P/LINEAR [2001] (K102/1) was thrown into the near-Earth region by Jupiter in 1800s, and probably this is the first time the comet is so close to the Sun. Since its Jupiter MOID is currently 0.2 AU, Jupiter remains the primary factor in its orbital disruption. The comet will approach Jupiter at 0.76 AU on 22 December 2033 and at 0.11 AU on 3 August 2046.

The comet passed at a distance of 0.0356 AU on 21.6 March 2016 and another close flyby from Earth will take place on 18 March 2032, at a distance of 0.050 AU.

== Physical characteristics ==
During the close flyby of 2016 the comet was observed by Hubble Space Telescope. The images revealed a narrow sunward jet from the nucleus. The jet changed positions indicating a rotation of the comet every 7.24±0.07 hours. The light curve of the nucleus however indicated a period of 5.41±0.07 hours. Observations from Lowell Observatory showed that the CN features of the coma indicated a period of around 22 hour or a sub-multiple and other features were repeated every ~95.5 hr, implying an actual period of 7.35±0.05 hours. It is possible that the comet is non principal axis rotator. The nucleus was estimated to have a radius of around 0.3±0.03 km.

The near infrared spectrum of the comet revealed the presence of H_{2}O, CH_{3}OH, C_{2}H_{6}, and HCN. The comet had a typical composition for a Jupiter family comet, but the abundance of methanol and ethane was higher and formaldehyde production was lower than that of other short period comets. The average production rate was (4.9±0.1)×10^{27} moles/s in April 2016. The CN production between 27 March and 3 April was 6.4×10^{24} mol/s. The dust production at the same time was 4 kg/s, indicating the a dust to gas mass ration of 0.025, which is among the lowest observed values for a comet.

== Associated meteor shower ==
252P/LINEAR is predicted to perhaps make a weak new meteor shower during its 2016 approach. Peter Jenniskens and Jeremie Vaubaillon calculated that possible meteors from this comet would radiate from the constellation of Lepus, south of Orion, from a radiant at R.A. = 77.0 deg, Decl. = -16.3 deg., with a slow geocentric velocity of Vg = 11.1 km/s on March 28 and 29, when Earth reaches the comet orbit. Rates will be low. There are no encounters with the dust trails created since A.D. 1850, but instead a diffuse cloud of perturbed meteoroids ejected during 1894-1926 is calculated to be in Earth's path.

Quan-Zhi Ye calculated that possible meteors from comet P/2016 BA_{14} (PanSTARRS) would radiate from the constellation Columba, south of Lepus during the late UT hours of March 20. The radiant is at R.A. = 82 deg, Decl. = -39 deg, with geocentric velocity Vg = 14.1 km/s. Meteoroids ejected since A.D. 1750 were studied, with also no dust trail encounters found in 2016.

A meteor shower has been observed with a similar orbit to 252P/LINEAR, previously known as the March Lyncids, in the constellation Lynx. It is not known for certain if the shower is related to the comet.

== Fragment ==
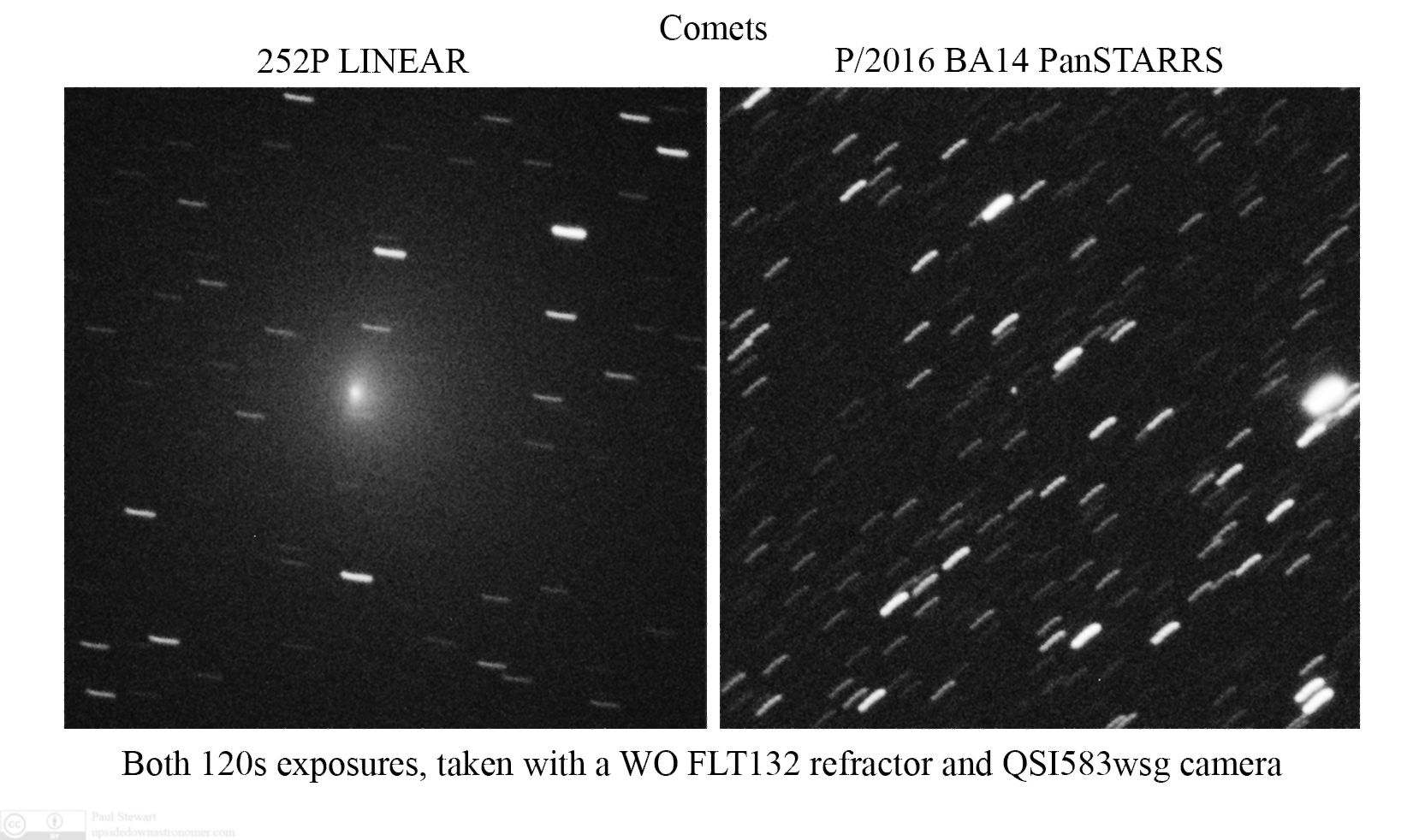
252P/LINEAR and 2016 BA_{14} images during their closest approaches in March 2016

P/2016 BA14 was radar imaged at a distance of 2.2 million mi (3.5 million km) during the flyby of Earth in 2016, one day after the closest flyby of 252P/LINEAR. This enabled the size of the nucleus to be calculated to be about 3,000–3,300 ft (0.91–1.01 km) in diameter, which was bigger than expected.

When it was discovered in January 2016, it was thought to be an asteroid and went by a provisional minor planet designation 2016 BA_{14}. An astronomer then realized the body's orbit was very similar to 252P/LINEAR, which lead to a follow-up observation by the Lowell Discovery Telescope. The body showed a tail, identifying it as a probable comet and then named P/2016 BA_{14}. After being reobserved in 2020 it was numbered and is now known as 460P/PanSTARRS.

== Gallery ==
Comet 252P/LINEAR appearing as a fuzzy and greenish blob above Paranal Observatory.

== See also ==
- 55P/Tempel–Tuttle
- 209P/LINEAR
- D/1770 L1 (Lexell)
- C/1983 H1 (IRAS–Araki–Alcock)

== Notes ==
Numbered comets
Previous; 251P/LINEAR	252P/LINEAR	Next; 253P/PanSTARRS
