= 108P/Ciffréo =

Jupiter-family comet

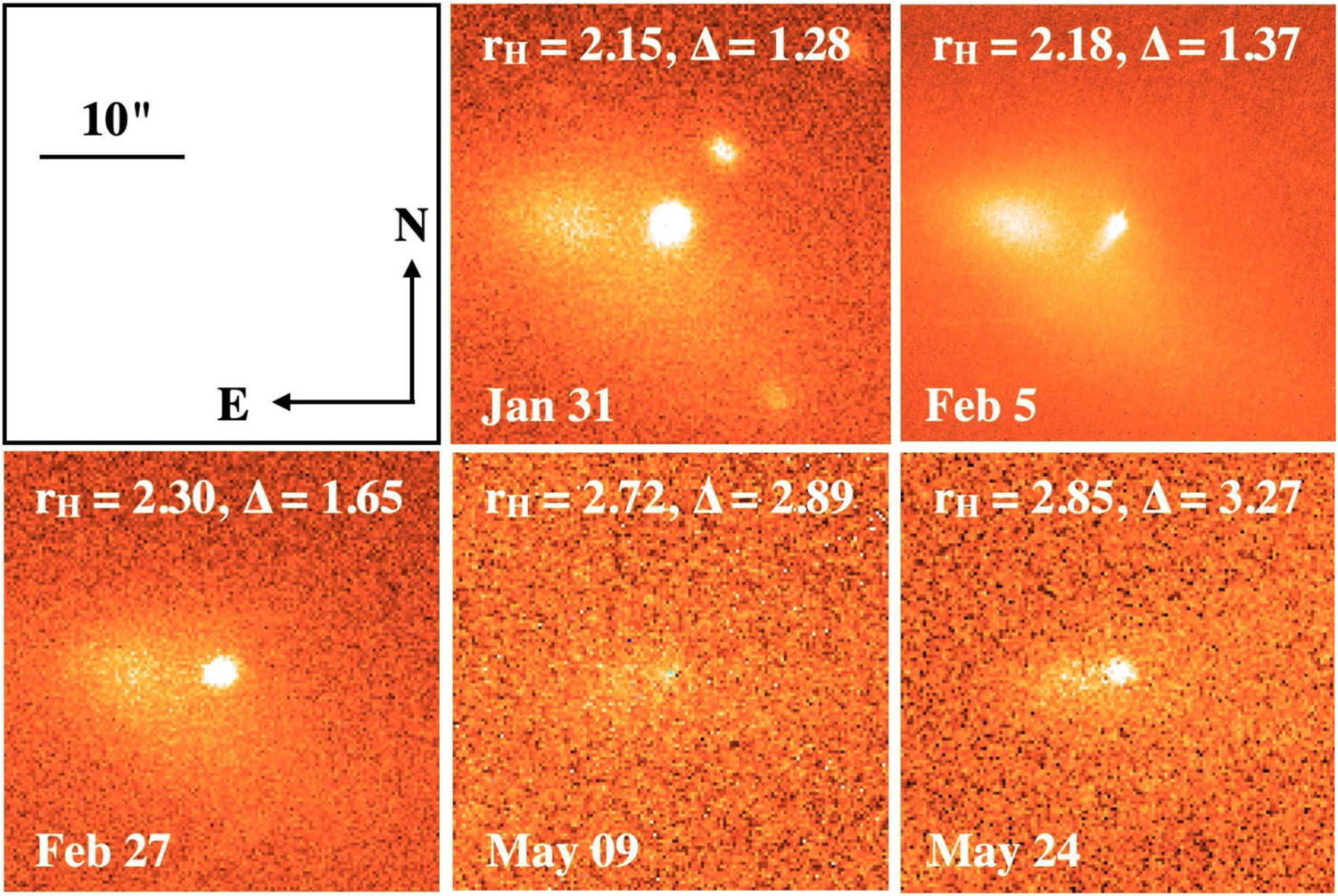
- Comet Ciffréo imaged by the Hubble Space Telescope from 31 January to 24 May 2022.

Discovery
- Discovered by: Jacqueline Ciffréo
- Discovery site: Caussols, France
- Discovery date: 8 November 1985

Designations
- MPC designation: P/1985 V1, P/1992 S1
- Alternative designations: 1985 XVI, 1993 I; 1985p, 1992s

Orbital characteristics
- Epoch: 21 November 2025 (JD 2461000.5)
- Observation arc: 36.38 years
- Number of observations: 2,612
- Aphelion: 5.824 AU
- Perihelion: 1.664 AU
- Semi-major axis: 3.744 AU
- Eccentricity: 0.581
- Orbital period: 7.245 years
- Inclination: 11.432°
- Longitude of ascending node: 50.274°
- Argument of periapsis: 354.56°
- Mean anomaly: 208.49°
- Last perihelion: 11 October 2021
- Next perihelion: 9 December 2028
- T_{Jupiter}: 2.750
- Earth MOID: 0.535 AU
- Jupiter MOID: 0.283 AU

Physical characteristics
- Mean diameter: 0.5 km (0.31 mi)
- Comet total magnitude (M1): 10.9
- Comet nuclear magnitude (M2): 15.9

108P/Ciffréo is a Jupiter-family comet with an orbital period of 7.25 years around the Sun. It is the only comet discovered by French astronomer, Jacqueline Ciffréo. The comet is noted for having a peculiar double morphology, in which the nucleus is accompanied by a comoving, detached, diffuse tail, which is probably a perspective artifact of particles ejected sunwards and then repelled by solar wind.

== Observational history ==
The comet was discovered by Jacqueline Ciffréo on 8 November 1985 using a 0.9 m Schmidt camera at Caussols. The comet was then a diffuse object with an apparent magnitude of 10. H. Kosai from the Tokyo Observatory noticed on 9 November that it also had a faint tail about 1.5 arcminutes long. An elliptical orbit was published by Daniel W. E. Green on 18 November, with an estimated orbital period of 7.81 years, while perihelion had taken place on 28 October 1985 at a distance of 1.72 AU (257 million km). Further observations revealed that the perihelion was on 30 October and the orbital period of the comet was 7.22 years. In December 1985, a detacted coma or tail was detected 6 arcseconds from the nucleus of the comet and extending for 20 arcseconds to the north-east. The visual magnitude of the comet was estimated to be 12.5.

The comet was recovered on 24 September 1992 by J. V. Scotti with the Spacewatch telescope. The comet passed perihelion on 23 January 1993. The next perihelion was in April 2000 and the comet was observed in November and December 1999 and November and December 2000. During the 2014 and 2021 apparition the comet featured a detached coma, similar to that observed in 1985. The peculiar morphology was attributed to a possible fragmentation event, but further observations revealed it is most probably an artifact of the turnaround of particles ejected sunward and repelled by sunlight.

== Orbit ==
The comet is at a 5:3 orbital resonance with Jupiter, allowing for frequent planetary encounters. Between 1900 and 2183, its closest approach to Jupiter will occur on 18 December 2076 at a distance of 0.28 AU (42 million km).

Initial orbital calculations of the comet indicated that it was a recently captured object. However, follow-up studies in 1990 later revealed that its dynamical behavior corresponds to a relatively "aged" object instead, where it has been on its current orbit for at least 1,500 revolutions since at least 12,000 BC.

Numbered comets
Previous; 107P/Wilson–Harrington	108P/Ciffréo	Next; 109P/Swift–Tuttle
