= 55P/Tempel–Tuttle =

Halley-type comet

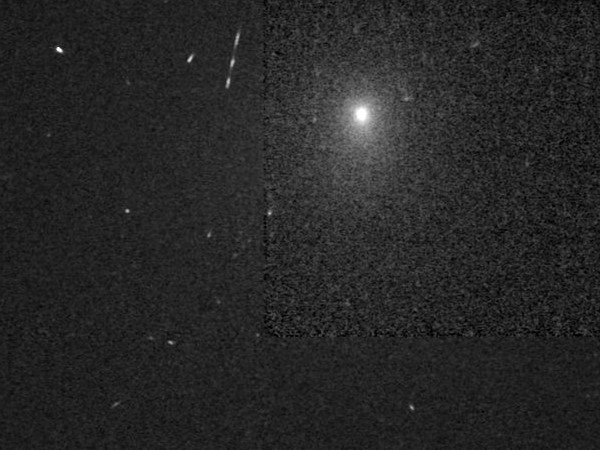
- Comet Tempel–Tuttle photographed by the Hubble Space Telescope on 9 January 1998

Discovery
- Discovered by: Wilhelm Tempel; Horace Parnell Tuttle
- Discovery date: 19 December 1865

Designations
- MPC designation: P/1366 U1, P/1699 U1; P/1865 Y1, P/1965 M2; P/1997 E1
- Alternative designations: 1699 II, 1866 I, 1965 IV

Orbital characteristics
- Epoch: 25 February 2023 (JD 2460000.5)
- Observation arc: 631.69 years
- Earliest precovery date: 25 October 1366
- Number of observations: 471
- Aphelion: 19.732 AU
- Perihelion: 0.975 AU
- Semi-major axis: 10.354 AU
- Eccentricity: 0.90587
- Orbital period: 33.318 years
- Inclination: 162.48°
- Longitude of ascending node: 235.41°
- Argument of periapsis: 172.45°
- Mean anomaly: 271.09°
- Last perihelion: 28 February 1998
- Next perihelion: 20 May 2031
- T_{Jupiter}: –0.637
- Earth MOID: 0.008 AU

Physical characteristics
- Mean radius: 1.8 ± 0.2 km (1.12 ± 0.12 mi)
- Synodic rotation period: 14.79–15.31 hours
- Geometric albedo: 0.78
- Spectral type: (B−V) = 0.75±0.05; (V–R) = 0.51±0.05
- Comet total magnitude (M1): 10.0
- Comet nuclear magnitude (M2): 16.0

55P/Tempel–Tuttle (commonly known as Comet Tempel–Tuttle) is a retrograde periodic comet with an orbital period of 33 years. It fits the classical definition of a Halley-type comet with a period of between 20 and 200 years. It was independently discovered by Wilhelm Tempel on 19 December 1865, and by Horace Parnell Tuttle on 6 January 1866. It is the parent body of the Leonid meteor shower.

== Observational history ==
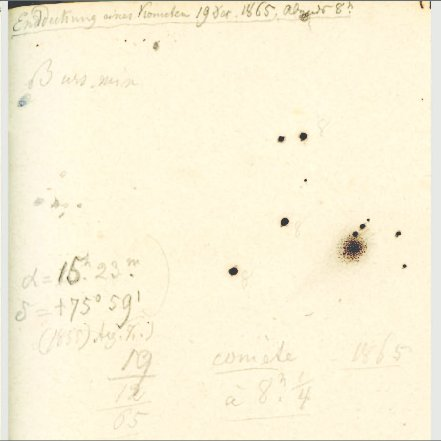
Sketch of the comet as it was discovered by Wilhelm Tempel on 19 December 1865.

In 1699, it was observed by Gottfried Kirch, however it was not recognized as a periodic comet until the discoveries by Tempel and Tuttle during the 1866 perihelion. In 1933, S. Kanda deduced that the comet of 1366 was Tempel–Tuttle, which was confirmed by Joachim Schubart in 1965. On 26 October 1366, the comet passed 0.0229 AU (3.43 million km; 2.13 million mi) from Earth. It is possible the comet was also observed in October 1234, however it is only mentioned briefly by a single Japanese source, and also a comet observed in China in January 1035 could be comet Temple–Tuttle, however unless it had undergone a major outburst, it would have been too dim to observe with the naked eye.

Comet Tempel–Tuttle was recovered by J. Schubart in images taken by Michiel John Bester on 30 June 1965 using the 10-inch telescope of Boyden Observatory, South Africa. At that time the comet had an apparent magnitude of 16. The presence of the comet was confirmed in plates obtained by Palomar Observatory on 30 June. These were the only two observations of the comet during the 1965 apparition.

The comet was recovered on 4 March 1997 by Karen Meech, Olivier Hainaut and James "Gerbs" Bauer, at the University of Hawai`i. At the time it was very faint (22.5 mag), but the recovery proved that it was returning on schedule and that its orbit was very well determined. During the 1998 apparition the comet brightened more than predicted and reached an apparent magnitude of 7.4–7.8 in late February and could be observed with binoculars. It was last observed on 5 July 1998.

== Physical characteristics ==
The nucleus of the comet was observed by Hubble Space Telescope during the 1998 apparition, and assuming an albedo of 0.04, its nucleus was estimated to have a mean radius of 1.8 km. Spectrometric observations of its nucleus reveal that it has a reddish color, with a B−V of 0.75±0.05 and V−R of 0.51±0.05. A jet was observed emanating from the nucleus and based on its movement the rotation period was calculated to be between 14.79±0.02 and 15.31±0.03 hours.

The spectrum of the comet revealed the presence of diatomic carbon, NH2 and [Oi]. The relative production rates indicate that the comet is depleted in diatomic carbon, with the gas-to-dust ratio also indicated it was gas rich compared with Halley's Comet. The infrared spectrum of the comet closely resembled that of a black body with a temperature of 330 K and lacked silicate emission that has been detected in other comets.

William Huggins observed the spectrum of the comet in January 1866, making it the second time spectrographic observations of a comet were obtained.

55P/Tempel–Tuttle is estimated to have a total nuclear mass of 1.2×10^{13} kg, with its meteoroid stream is estimated to have a mass of 5×10^{12} kg in total.

== Orbit ==
55P/Tempel–Tuttle Earth approaches
Year	Nominal geocentric distance (AU)
1366	0.023 AU (3.4 million km)
1699	0.064 AU (9.6 million km)
1832	0.171 AU (25.6 million km)
1998	0.356 AU (53.3 million km)
2031	0.791 AU (118.3 million km)
2163	0.132 AU (19.7 million km)

Orbital calculations in 2014 suggested that Tempel–Tuttle was at one point about 5,000 years before discovery, the comet made a close encounter with Uranus, which reduced its orbital period from that of a long-period comet out to the Kuiper Belt to its present-day 33-year retrograde orbit around the Sun, however this remains unconfirmed.

The comet currently has an Earth-MOID of about 0.008 AU (1.2 million km).

Animation of 55P/Tempel–Tuttle's orbit from 1990 to 2180

Around Sun

Around Earth

Sun · Earth · Mars · Jupiter · 55P/Tempel–Tuttle

== Meteor shower ==
Tempel–Tuttle is the parent body of the Leonid meteor shower. The retrograde orbit of 55P/Tempel–Tuttle causes meteors to impact Earth at a high speed of 70 km/s. The orbit intersects that of Earth nearly exactly, hence streams of material ejected from the comet during perihelion passages do not have to spread out much over time to encounter Earth. This coincidence means that past streams from the comet at perihelion are still dense when they encounter Earth, resulting in the 33-year cycle of Leonid meteor storms. For example, the 1833 meteor storm was created by the previous 1800 perihelion passage. Between 2021–2030, Earth will often pass through the meteoroid stream left behind from the 1733 orbit.

== See also ==
- Cometary close approaches to Earth
  - D/1770 L1 (Lexell)
  - C/1983 H1 (IRAS–Araki–Alcock)
  - 252P/LINEAR
  - 460P/PanSTARRS

== Bibliography ==
- Kronk, Gary W.; Meyer, Maik; Seargent, David A. J. (1999). Cometography: A Catalog of Comets. Vol. 1: Ancient–1799. Cambridge University Press. ISBN 978-0-521-58504-0.

Numbered comets
Previous; 54P/de Vico–Swift–NEAT	55P/Tempel–Tuttle	Next; 56P/Slaughter–Burnham
