= International Ultraviolet Explorer =

Astronomical observatory satellite

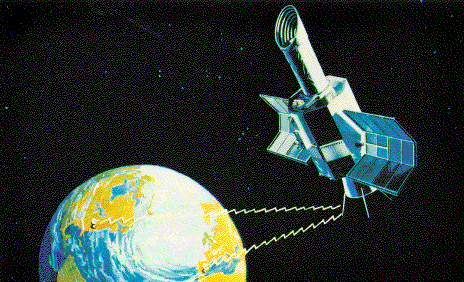
- International Ultraviolet Explorer (Explorer 57) satellite
- Names: Explorer 57; IUE; SAS-D
- Mission type: Ultraviolet astronomy
- Operator: NASA / ESA / SERC
- COSPAR ID: 1978-012A
- SATCAT no.: 10637
- Website: ESA Science and Technology; NASA IUE Archive
- Mission duration: 18 years, 8 months, 4 days (achieved); 3 years (planned)

Spacecraft properties
- Spacecraft: Explorer LVII
- Spacecraft type: International Ultraviolet Explorer
- Bus: SAS (Small Astronomy Satellite)
- Manufacturer: Goddard Space Flight Center
- Launch mass: 669 kg (1,475 lb)
- Power: 424 watts

Start of mission
- Launch date: 26 January 1978, 17:36:00 UTC
- Rocket: Thor-Delta 2914, (Thor 628 / Delta 138)
- Launch site: Kennedy Space Center, LC-17A
- Contractor: Douglas Aircraft Company
- Entered service: 3 April 1978

End of mission
- Deactivated: 30 September 1996
- Last contact: 30 September 1996, at 18:44 UTC

Orbital parameters
- Reference system: Geocentric orbit
- Regime: Geosynchronous orbit
- Longitude: 70.0° West

Main telescope
- Type: Ritchey-Chretien Cassegrain reflector
- Diameter: 45 cm (18 in)
- Focal ratio: f/15
- Wavelengths: Ultraviolet 115 to 320 nm

Instruments
- Particle Flux Monitor (Spacecraft); Ultraviolet Spectrograph Package
- Legacy ESA insignia (2020s) Explorer Program

International Ultraviolet Explorer (IUE or Explorer 57, formerly SAS-D) was the first space observatory primarily designed to take ultraviolet (UV) spectra. The satellite was a collaborative project between NASA, the United Kingdom's Science and Engineering Research Council (SERC, formerly UKSRC) and the European Space Agency (ESA), formerly European Space Research Organisation (ESRO). The mission was first proposed in early 1964, by a group of scientists in the United Kingdom, and was launched on 26 January 1978, 17:36:00 UTC aboard a NASA Thor-Delta 2914 launch vehicle. The mission lifetime was initially set for 3 years, but in the end, it lasted 18 years, with the satellite being shut down in 1996. The switch-off occurred for financial reasons, while the telescope was still functioning at near original efficiency.

It was the first space observatory to be operated in real-time by astronomers who visited the ground stations in the United States and Spain. Astronomers made over 104,000 observations using the IUE, of objects ranging from Solar System bodies to distant quasars. Among the significant scientific results from IUE data were the first large-scale studies of stellar winds, accurate measurements of the way interstellar dust absorbs light, and measurements of the supernova SN 1987A which showed that it defied stellar evolution theories as they then stood. When the mission ended, it was considered the most successful astronomical satellite ever.

== History ==
=== Motivation ===
The human eye can perceive light with wavelengths between roughly 350 (violet) and 700 (red) nanometres. Ultraviolet light has wavelengths between roughly 10 nm and 350 nm. UV light can be harmful to human beings and is strongly absorbed by the ozone layer. This makes it impossible to observe UV emission from astronomical objects from the ground. Many types of objects emit copious quantities of UV radiation, though: the hottest and most massive stars in the universe can have surface temperatures high enough that the vast majority of their light is emitted in the UV. Active Galactic Nuclei, accretion disks, and supernovae all emit UV radiation strongly, and many chemical elements have strong absorption lines in the UV so that UV absorption by the interstellar medium provides a powerful tool for studying its composition.

Ultraviolet astronomy was impossible before the Space Age, and some of the first space telescopes were UV telescopes designed to observe this previously inaccessible region of the electromagnetic spectrum. One particular success was the second Orbiting Astronomical Observatory (OAO-2), which had a number of 20 cm (7.9 in) UV telescopes on board. It was launched in 1968 and took the first UV observations of 1200 objects, mostly stars. The success of OAO-2 motivated astronomers to consider larger missions.

=== Conception ===
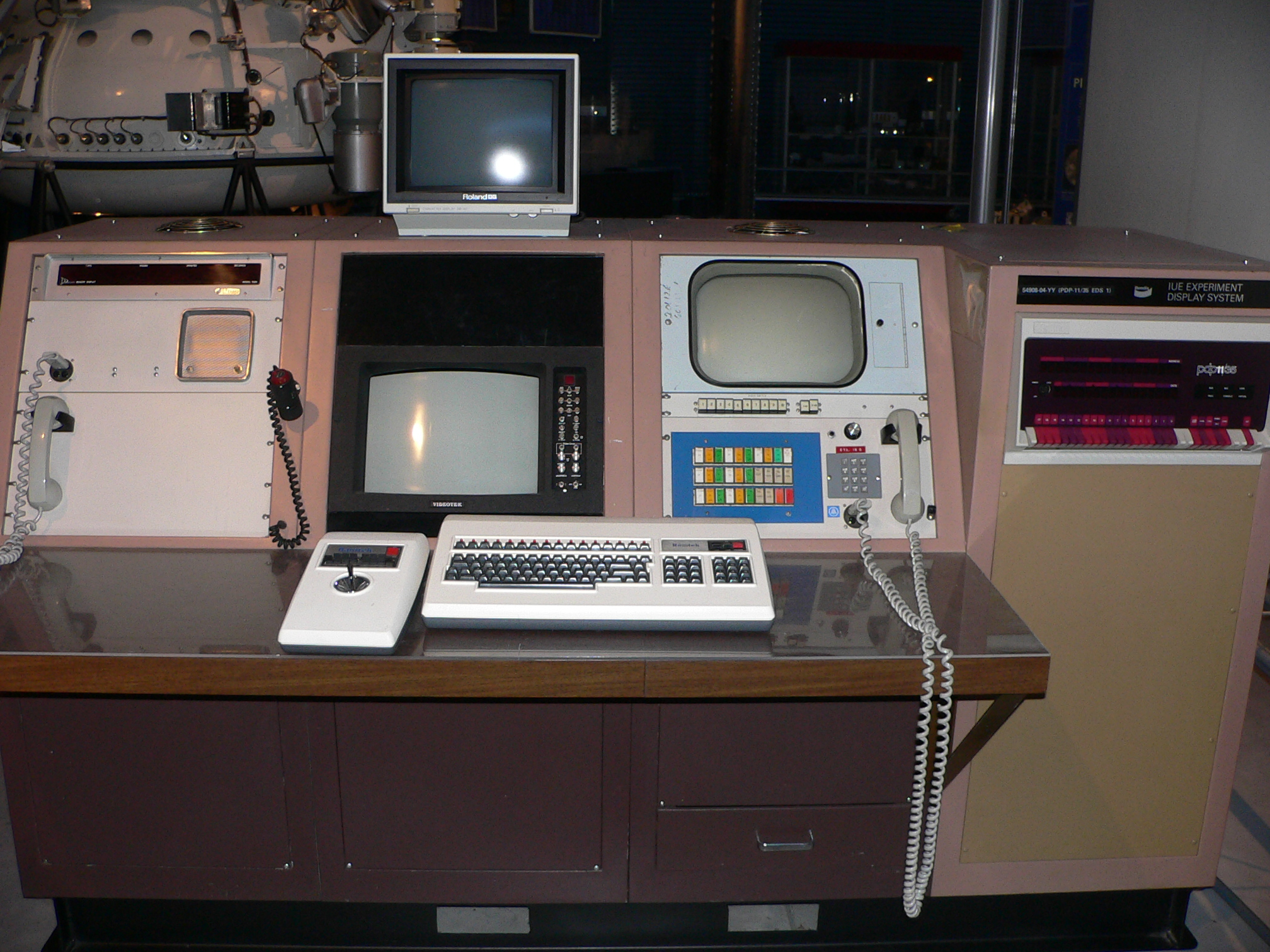
A shell of a control and display unit for the International Ultraviolet Explorer (IUE) satellite, preserved in the Steven F. Udvar-Hazy Center

The orbiting ultraviolet satellite which ultimately became the IUE mission was first proposed in 1964 by British astronomer Robert Wilson. The European Space Research Organisation (ESRO) was planning a Large Astronomical Satellite (LAS), and had sought proposals from the astronomical community for its aims and design. Wilson headed a British team which proposed an ultraviolet spectrograph, and their design was recommended for acceptance in 1966.

However, management problems and cost overruns led to the cancellation of the LAS program in 1968. Wilson's team scaled down their plans and submitted a more modest proposal to ESRO, but this was not selected as the Cosmic Ray satellite was given precedence. Rather than give up on the idea of an orbiting UV telescope, they instead sent their plans to NASA astronomer Leo Goldberg, and in 1973 the plans were approved. The proposed telescope was renamed the International Ultraviolet Explorer.

=== Design and aims ===
The telescope was designed from the start to be operated in real-time, rather than by remote control. This required that it would be launched into a geosynchronous orbit – that is, one with a period equal to one sidereal day of 23 h 56 m. A satellite in such an orbit remains visible from a given point on the Earth's surface for many hours at a time, and can thus transmit to a single ground station for a long period of time. Most space observatories in Earth orbit, such as the Hubble Space Telescope, are in a low Earth orbit in which they spend most of their time operating autonomously because only a small fraction of the Earth's surface can see them at a given time. Hubble, for example, orbits the Earth at an altitude of approximately 600 km (370 mi), while a geosynchronous orbit has an average altitude of 36,000 km (22,000 mi).

As well as allowing continuous communications with ground stations, a geosynchronous orbit also allows a larger portion of the sky to be viewed continuously. Because the distance from Earth is greater, the Earth occupies a much smaller portion of the sky as seen from the satellite than it does from low Earth orbit.

A launch into a geosynchronous orbit requires much more energy for a given weight of payload than a launch into a low Earth orbit. This meant that the telescope had to be relatively small, with a 45 cm (18 in) primary mirror, and a total weight of 312 kg (688 lb). Hubble, in comparison, weighs 11.1 tonnes and has a 2.4 m (7 ft 10 in) mirror. The largest ground-based telescope, the Gran Telescopio Canarias, has a primary mirror 10.4 m (34 ft) across. A smaller mirror means less light-gathering power, and less spatial resolution, compared to a larger mirror.

The stated aims of the telescope at the start of the mission were:

- To obtain high-resolution spectra of stars of all spectral types to determine their physical characteristics;
- To study gas streams in and around binary star system;
- To observe faint stars, galaxies and quasars at low resolution, interpreting these spectra by reference to high-resolution spectra;
- To observe the spectra of planets and comets;
- To make repeated observations of objects with variable spectrum;
- To study the modification of starlight caused by interstellar dust and gas.

=== Construction and engineering ===
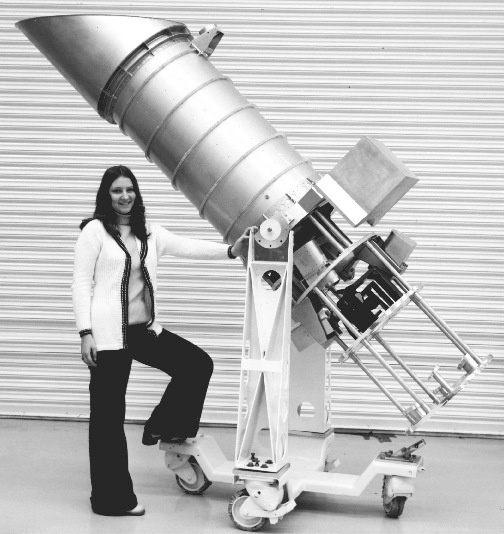
The core of the science hardware of the IUE: the telescope tube and sunshade extend above the pivot point of the support stand, the cameras are just below, and some of the mirrors and diffraction gratings are at the bottom. The box extending from the midpoint of the assembly covers the location of the spacecraft gyroscopes.

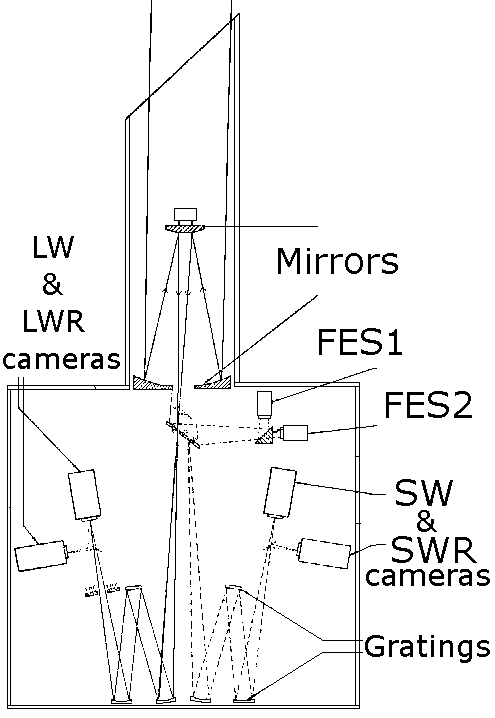
Simplified optical diagram of the telescope

The telescope was constructed as a joint project between NASA, ESRO (which became ESA in 1975) and the United Kingdom's SERC. SERC provided the Vidicon cameras for the spectrographs as well as software for the scientific instruments. ESA provided the solar arrays to power the spacecraft as well as a ground observing facility in Villafranca del Castillo, Spain. NASA contributed the telescope, spectrograph, and spacecraft as well as launching facilities and a second ground observatory in Greenbelt, Maryland at the Goddard Space Flight Center (GSFC).

According to the agreement setting up the project the observing time would be divided between the contributing agencies with 2/3 to NASA, 1/6 to ESA and 1/6 to the UK's SERC.

=== Mirror ===
The telescope mirror was a reflector of the Ritchey–Chrétien telescope type, which has hyperbolic primary and secondary mirrors. The primary was 45 cm (18 in) across. The telescope was designed to give high-quality images over a 16 arcminute field of view (about half the apparent diameter of the Sun or Moon). The primary mirror was made of beryllium, and the secondary of fused silica – materials chosen for their light weight, moderate cost, and optical quality.

=== Instruments ===
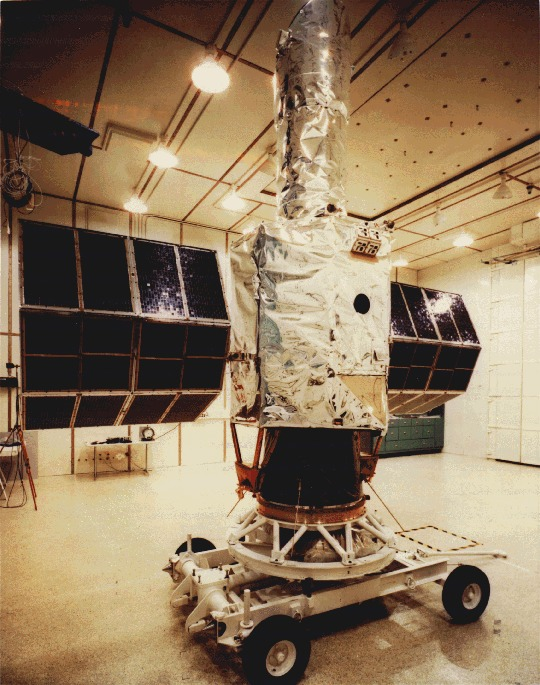
Fully assembled IUE with the telescope tube on top and solar panel extended

The instrumentation on board consisted of the Fine Error Sensors (FES), which were used for pointing and guiding the telescope, a high-resolution and a low-resolution spectrograph, and four detectors.

There were two Fine Error Sensors (FES), and their first purpose was to image the field of view of the telescope in visible light. They could detect stars down to 14th magnitude, about 1500 times fainter than can be seen with the naked eye from Earth. The image was transmitted to the ground station, where the observer would verify that the telescope was pointing at the correct field, and then acquire the exact object to be observed. If the object to be observed was fainter than 14th magnitude, the observer would point the telescope at a star that could be seen, and then apply "blind" offsets, determined from the coordinates of the objects. The accuracy of the pointing was generally better than 2 arcsecond for blind offsets

The FES acquisition images were the telescope's only imaging capability; for UV observations, it only recorded spectrum. For this, it was equipped with two spectrographs. They were called the Short Wavelength Spectrograph (SWS) and the Long Wavelength Spectrograph (LWS) and covered wavelength ranges of 115 to 200 nanometres and 185 to 330 nm respectively. Each spectrograph had both high and low-resolution modes, with spectral resolutions of 0.02 and 0.60-nm respectively.

The spectrographs could be used with either of two apertures. The larger aperture was a slot with a field of view roughly 10 × 20 arcseconds; the smaller aperture was a circle about 3 arcseconds in diameter. The quality of the telescope optics was such that point sources appeared about 3 arcseconds across, so the use of the smaller aperture required very accurate pointing, and it did not necessarily capture all of the light from the object. The larger aperture was therefore most commonly used, and the smaller aperture was only used when the larger field of view would have contained unwanted emission from other objects.

There were two cameras for each spectrograph, one designated the primary and the second being redundant in case of failure of the first. The cameras were named LWP, LWR, SWP and SWR where P stands for prime, R for redundant and LW/SW for long/short wavelength. The cameras were television cameras, sensitive only to visible light, and light gathered by the telescope and spectrographs first fell on a UV-to-visible converter. This was a caesium-tellurium cathode, which was inert when exposed to visible light, but which gave off electrons when struck by UV photons due to the photoelectric effect. The electrons were then detected by the TV cameras. The signal could be integrated for up to many hours, before being transmitted to Earth at the end of the exposure.

== Mission ==
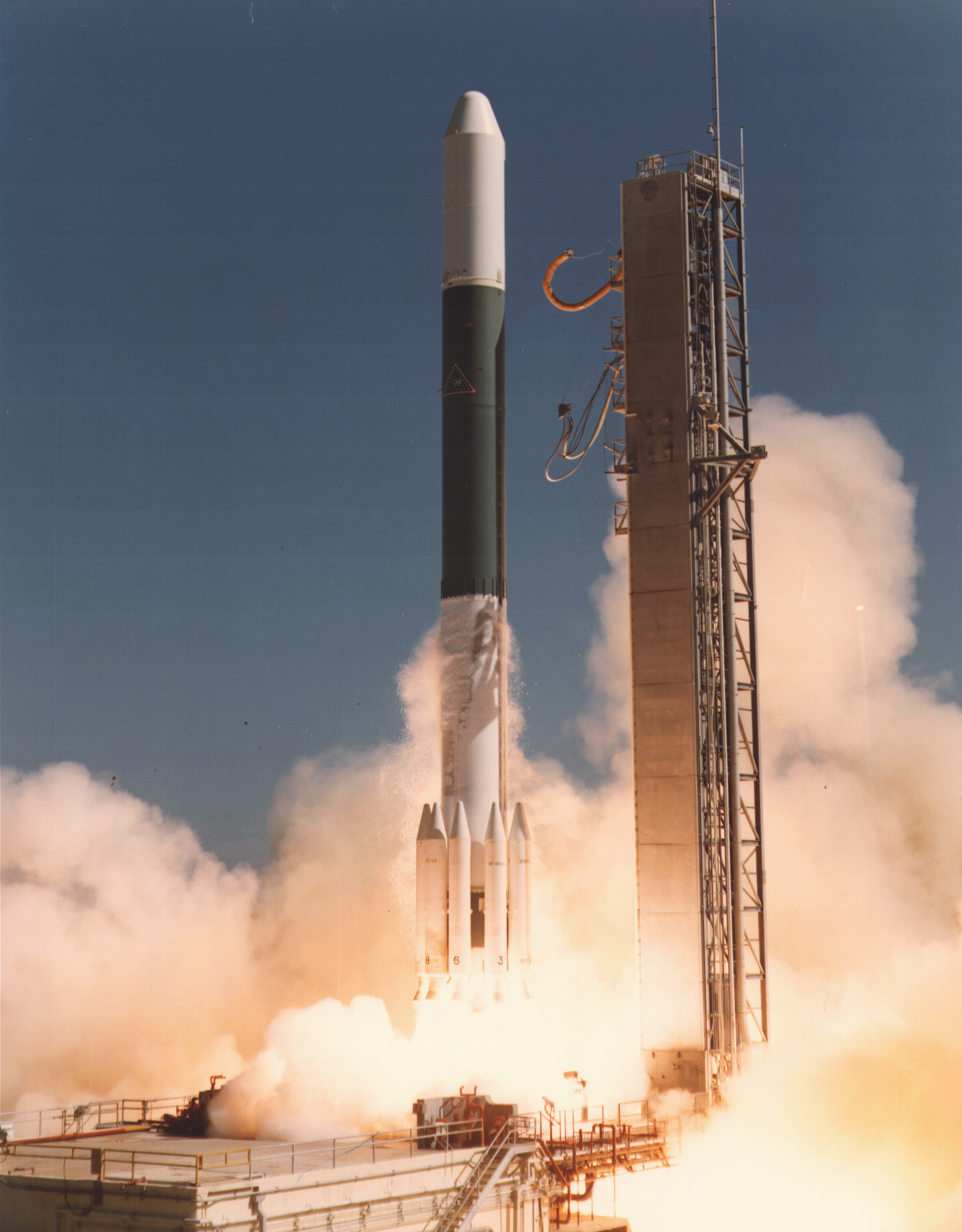
Delta 2914 launching IUE spacecraft on 26 January 1978 from Kennedy Space Center

=== Launch ===
The IUE was launched from Kennedy Space Center, Florida on a Thor-Delta launch vehicle, on 26 January 1978. It was launched into a transfer orbit, from which its onboard launch vehicle fired it into its planned geosynchronous orbit. The orbit was inclined by 28.6° to the Earth's equator and had an orbital eccentricity of 0.24, meaning that the satellite's distance from Earth varied between 25,669 km (15,950 mi) and 45,887 km (28,513 mi). The ground track was initially centered at a longitude of approximately 70° West.

=== Commissioning ===
The first 60 days of the mission were designated as the commissioning period. This was divided into three main stages. Firstly, as soon as its instruments were switched on, the IUE observed a small number of high-priority objects, to ensure that some data had been taken in the event of an early failure. The first spectrum, of the star Eta Ursae Majoris, was taken for calibration purposes three days after launch. The first science observations targeted objects including the Moon, the planets from Mars to Uranus, hot stars including Eta Carinae, cool giant stars including Epsilon Eridani, the black hole candidate Cygnus X-1, and galaxies including Messier 81 (M81) and Messier 87 (M87).

Then, the spacecraft systems were tested and optimized. The telescope was focused, and the prime and redundant cameras in both channels were tested. It was found that the SWR camera did not work properly, and so the SWP camera was used throughout the mission. Initially, this camera suffered from significant electronic noise, but this was traced to a sensor used to align the telescope after launch. Once this sensor was switched off, the camera performed as expected. The cameras were then adjusted for best performance, and the slewing and guiding performance of the telescope was evaluated and optimized

Finally, image quality and spectral resolution were studied and characterized, and the performance of the telescope, spectrographs and cameras were calibrated using observations of well-known stars. After these three phases were completed, the "routine phase" of operations began on 3 April 1978. Optimization, evaluation and calibration operations were far from complete, but the telescope was understood well enough for routine science observations to begin.

== Usage ==
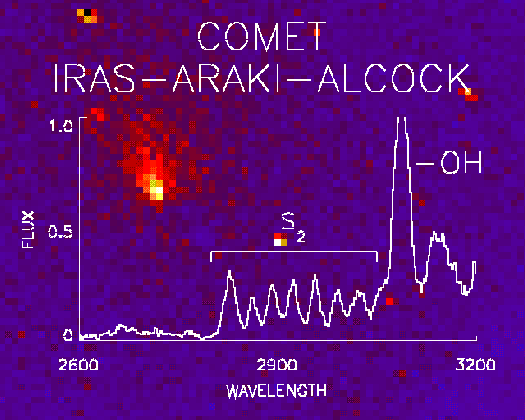
Comet IRAS–Araki–Alcock was the 7th comet discovered in 1983. This figure combines an FES image showing its diffuse tail and the long-wavelength redundant (LWR) spectrum depicting the molecular emission lines of sulfur (S_{2}) and hydroxyl (OH).

Use of the telescope was divided between NASA, ESA and United Kingdom in approximate proportion to their relative contributions to the satellite construction: two-thirds of the time was available to NASA, and one-sixth each to ESA and United Kingdom. Telescope time was obtained by submitting proposals, which were reviewed annually. Each of the three agencies considered applications separately for its allocated observing time. Astronomers of any nationality could apply for telescope time, choosing whichever agency they preferred to apply to. If an astronomer was awarded time, then when their observations were scheduled, they would travel to the ground stations which operated the satellite, so that they could see and evaluate their data as it was taken. This mode of operation was very different from most space facilities, for which data is taken with no real-time input from the astronomer concerned, and instead resembled the use of ground-based telescopes.

=== Ground support ===
For most of its lifetime, the telescope was operated in three eight-hour shifts each day, two from the U.S. ground station at the Goddard Space Flight Center in Maryland, and one from the ESA ground station at Villanueva de la Cañada near Madrid. Because of its elliptical orbit, the spacecraft spent part of each day in the Van Allen radiation belts, during which time science observations suffered from higher background noise. This time occurred during the second U.S. shift each day and was generally used for calibration observations and spacecraft "housekeeping", as well as for science observations that could be done with short exposure times. The twice-daily transatlantic handovers required telephone contact between Spain and the United States to coordinate the switch. Observations were not coordinated between the stations so that the astronomers taking over after the handover would not know where the telescope would be pointing when their shift started. This sometimes meant that observing shifts started with a lengthy pointing maneuver, but allowed maximum flexibility in scheduling of observing blocks.

=== Data transmission ===
Data was transmitted to Earth in real-time at the end of each science observation. The camera read-out formed an image of 768 × 768 pixels, and the analogue-to-digital converter resulted in a dynamic range of 8 bits. The data was then transmitted to Earth via one of six transmitters on the spacecraft; four were S-band transmitters, placed at points around the spacecraft such that no matter what its attitude, one could transmit to the ground, and two were Very high frequency (VHF) transmitters, which could sustain a lower bandwidth, but consumed less power, and also transmitted in all directions. The VHF transmitters were used when the spacecraft was in the Earth's shadow and thus reliant on battery power instead of solar power.

In normal operations, observers could hold the telescope in position and wait approximately 20 minutes for the data to be transmitted, if they wanted the option of repeating the observation, or they could slew to the next target and then start the data transmission to Earth while observing the next target. The data transmitted were used for "quick look" purposes only, and full calibration was carried out by IUE staff later. Astronomers were then sent their data on magnetic tape by post, about a week after processing. From the date of the observation, the observers had a six-month proprietary period during which only they had access to the data. After six months, it became public.

== Scientific results ==
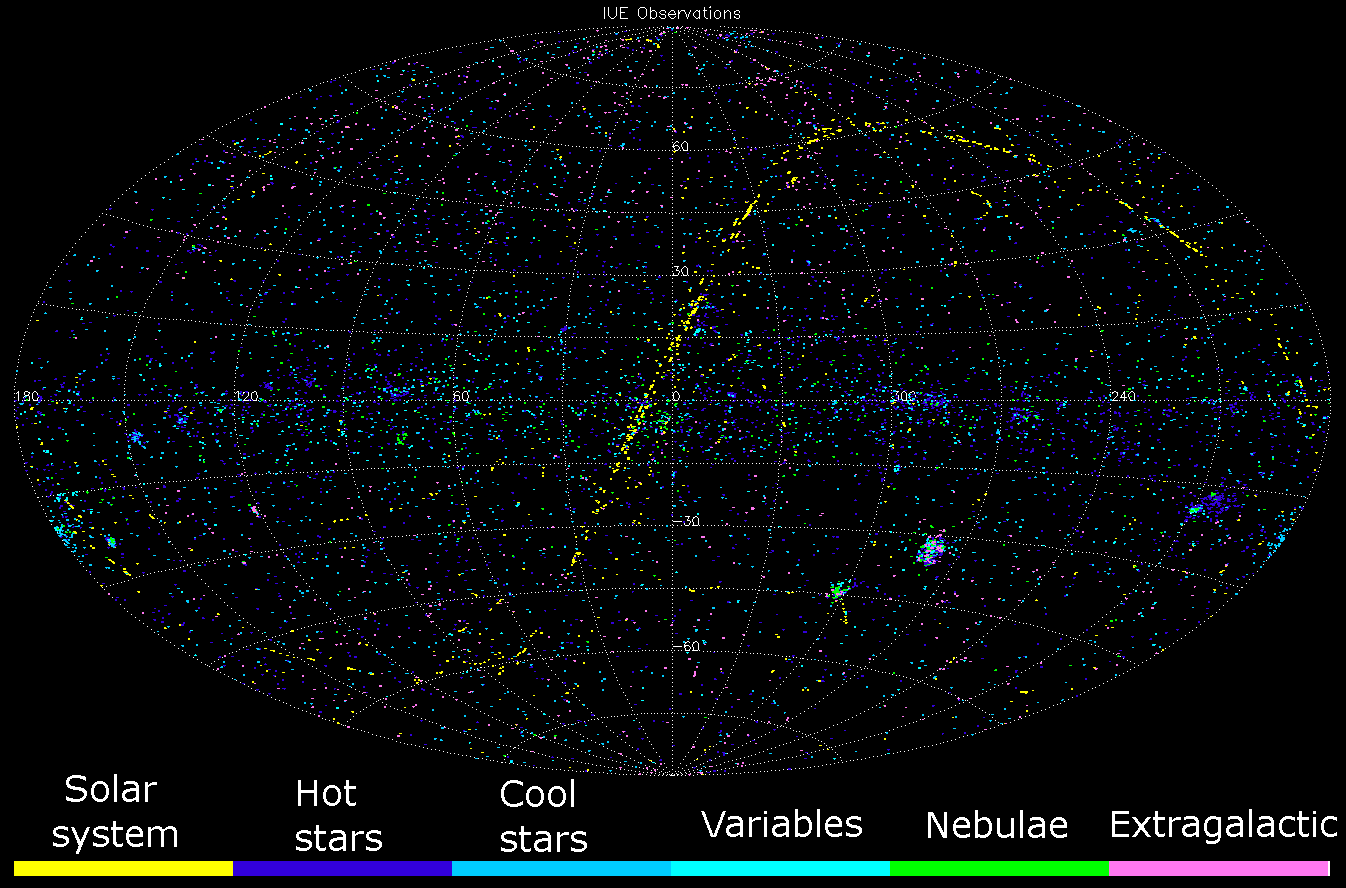
IUE observations chart on a projection map of entire sky

The IUE allowed astronomers their first view of the ultraviolet light from many celestial objects and was used to study objects ranging from Solar System planets to distant quasars. During its lifetime, hundreds of astronomers observed with IUE, and during its first decade of operations, over 1500 peer reviewed scientific articles based on IUE data were published. Nine symposia of the International Astronomical Union (IAU) were devoted to discussions of IUE results.

=== Solar System ===
All the planets in the Solar System except Mercury were observed; the telescope could not point at any part of the sky within 45° of the Sun, and Mercury's greatest angular distance from the Sun is only about 28°. IUE observations of Venus showed that the amount of sulfur monoxide and sulfur dioxide in its atmosphere declined by a large amount during the 1980s. The reason for this decline is not yet fully understood, but one hypothesis is that a large volcanic eruption had injected sulfur compounds into the atmosphere, and that they were declining following the end of the eruption.

Halley's Comet reached perihelion in 1986, and was observed intensively with the IUE, as well as with a large number of other ground-based and satellite missions. UV spectra were used to estimate the rate at which the comet lost dust and gas, and the IUE observations allowed astronomers to estimate that a total of 3×10^{8} tons of water evaporated from the comet during its passage through the inner Solar System.

=== Stars ===
Some of the most significant results from IUE came in the studies of hot stars. A star that is hotter than about 10,000 K emits most of its radiation in the UV, and thus if it can only be studied in visible light, a large amount of information is being lost. The vast majority of all stars are cooler than the Sun, but the fraction that is hotter includes massive, highly luminous stars which shed enormous quantities of matter into interstellar space, and also white dwarf stars, which are the end stage of stellar evolution for the vast majority of all stars and which have temperatures as high as 100,000 K when they first form.

The IUE discovered many instances of white dwarf companions to main sequence stars. An example of this kind of system is Sirius, and at visible wavelengths, the main sequence star is far brighter than the white dwarf. However, in the UV, the white dwarf can be as bright or brighter, as its higher temperature means it emits most of its radiation at these shorter wavelengths. In these systems, the white dwarf was originally the heavier star but has shed most of its mass during the later stages of its evolution. Binary stars provide the only direct way to measure the mass of stars, from observations of their orbital motions. Thus, observations of binary stars where the two components are at such different stages of stellar evolution can be used to determine the relationship between the mass of stars and how they evolve.

Stars with masses of around ten times that of the Sun or higher have powerful stellar winds. The Sun loses about 10^{−14} solar masses per year in its solar wind, which travels at up to around 750 km/s (470 mi/s), but the massive stars can lose as much as a billion times more material each year in winds traveling at several thousand kilometers per second. These stars exist for a few million years, and during this time the stellar wind carries away a significant fraction of their mass and plays a crucial role in determining whether they explode as supernova or not. This stellar mass loss was first discovered using rocket-borne telescopes in the 1960s, but the IUE allowed astronomers to observe a very large number of stars, allowing the first proper studies of how stellar mass loss is related to mass and luminosity.

=== SN 1987A ===
In 1987, a star in the Large Magellanic Cloud exploded as a supernova. Designated SN 1987A, this event was of enormous importance to astronomy, as it was the closest known supernova to Earth, and the first visible to the naked eye, since Kepler's star in 1604 – before the invention of the telescope. The opportunity to study a supernova so much more closely than had ever been possible before triggered intense observing campaigns at all major astronomical facilities, and the first IUE observations were made about 14 hours after the discovery of the supernova.

IUE data were used to determine that the progenitor star had been a blue supergiant, where theory had strongly expected a red supergiant. Hubble Space Telescope images revealed a nebula surrounding the progenitor star which consisted of mass lost by the star long before it exploded; IUE studies of this material showed that it was rich in nitrogen, which is formed in the CNO cycle – a chain of nuclear reactions which produces most of the energy emitted by stars much more massive than the Sun. Astronomers inferred that the star had been a red supergiant, and had shed a large amount of matter into space, before evolving into a blue supergiant and exploding.

=== The interstellar medium ===
The IUE was used extensively to investigate the interstellar medium (ISM). The ISM is normally observed by looking at background sources such as hot stars or quasars; interstellar material absorbs some of the light from the background source and so its composition and velocity can be studied. One of IUE's early discoveries was that the Milky Way is surrounded by a vast halo of hot gas, known as a galactic corona. The hot gas, heated by cosmic rays and supernova, extends several thousand light years above and below the plane of the Milky Way.

IUE data was also crucial in determining how the light from distant sources is affected by dust along the line of sight. Almost all astronomical observations are affected by this interstellar extinction, and correcting for it is the first step in most analyses of astronomical spectra and images. IUE data was used to show that within the galaxy, interstellar extinction can be well described by a few simple equations. The relative variation of extinction with wavelength shows little variation with direction; only the absolute amount of absorption changes. Interstellar absorption in other galaxies can similarly be described by fairly simple "laws".

=== Active Galactic Nuclei ===
The IUE vastly increased astronomers' understanding of active galactic nuclei (AGN). Before its launch, 3C 273, the first known quasar, was the only AGN that had ever been observed at UV wavelengths. With IUE, UV spectra of AGN became widely available.

One particular target was NGC 4151, the brightest Seyfert galaxy. Starting soon after IUE's launch, a group of European astronomers pooled their observing time to repeatedly observe the galaxy, to measure variations over time of its UV emission. They found that the UV variation was much greater than that seen at optical and infrared wavelengths. IUE observations were used to study the black hole at the centre of the galaxy, with its mass being estimated at between 50 and 100 million times that of the Sun. The UV emission varied on timescales of a few days, implying that the region of emission was only a few light days across.

Quasar observations were used to probe intergalactic space. Clouds of hydrogen gas in between the Earth and a given quasar will absorb some of its emission at the wavelength of Lyman alpha. Because the clouds and the quasar are all at different distances from Earth, and moving at different velocities due to the expansion of the universe, the quasar spectrum has a "forest" of absorption features at wavelengths shorter than its own Lyman alpha emission. Before IUE, observations of this so-called Lyman-alpha forest were limited to very distant quasars, for which the redshift caused by the expansion of the universe brought it into optical wavelengths. IUE allowed nearer quasars to be studied, and astronomers used this data to determine that there are fewer hydrogen clouds in the nearby universe than there are in the distant universe. The implication is that over time, these clouds have formed into galaxies.

=== Ultraviolet Spectrograph Package ===
This experiment included the ultraviolet spectrograph package carried by the IUE, consisting of two physically distinct echelle-spectrograph/camera units capable of astronomical observations. Each spectrograph was a three-element echelle system composed of an off-axis paraboloidal collimator, an echelle grating, and a spherical first-order grating that was used to separate the echelle orders and focus the spectral display on an image converter plus SEC Vidicon camera. There was a spare camera for each unit. The camera units were able to integrate the signal. The readout/preparation cycle for the cameras took approximately 20 minutes. Wavelength calibration was provided by the use of a hollow cathode comparison lamp. The photometric calibration was accomplished by observing standard stars whose spectral fluxes had previously been calibrated by other means.

Both echelle-spectrograph/camera units were capable of high-resolution (0.1 Angstrom (A)) or low-resolution (6 A) performance. The dual high/low-resolution capability was implemented by the insertion of a flat mirror in front of the echelle grating so that the only dispersion was provided by the spherical grating. As the SEC Vidicons could integrate the signal for up to many hours, data with a signal-to-noise ratio of 50 could be obtained for B0 stars of 9th and 14th magnitudes in the high- and low-resolution modes, respectively.

The distinguishing characteristic of the units was their wavelength coverage. One unit covered the wavelength range from 1192 to 1924 A in the high-resolution mode and 1135 to 2085 A in the low-resolution mode. For the other unit, the ranges were from 1893 to 3031 A and 1800 to 3255 A for the high-and low-resolution modes, respectively. Each unit also had its own choice of entrance apertures: either a 3-arcsecond hole or a 10- by 20-arcsecond slot. The 10- by 20-arcsecond slots could be blocked by a common shutter, but the 3-arcsecond aperture was always open. As a result, two aperture configurations were possible: (1) both 3-arcsecond apertures open and both 10- by 20-arcsecond slots closed, or (2) all four apertures open. With this instrumentation, the observational options open to an observer were long-wavelength and/or short-wavelength spectrograph, high or low resolution, and large or small apertures. Exposures could be made with the two spectrographs simultaneously, but the entrance apertures for each were distinct and separated in the sky by about 1 arcminute. An additional restriction was that data could be read out from only one camera at a time. However, one camera could be exposed while the other camera was being read out. The choice of high or low resolution could be made independently for the two spectrographs.

=== Particle Flux Monitor (Spacecraft) ===
The particle flux monitor experiment was placed in IUE to monitor the trapped electron fluxes that affected the sensitivity of the ultraviolet sensor in the IUE spectrograph package experiment, NSSDC ID 1978-012A-01. The particle flux monitor was a lithium-drifted silicon detector with a half-angle conical field of view of 16°. It had an aluminum absorber of 0.357 g/cm^{2} in front of the collimator and a brass shield with a minimum thickness of 2.31 g/cm^{2}. The effective energy threshold for electron measurements was 1.3 MeV. The experiment was also sensitive to protons with energies greater than 15 MeV. The instrument was used as an operational tool to aid in determining background radiation and acceptable camera exposure time. The data were also useful as a monitor of the trapped radiation fluxes. The instrument was provided by Dr. C. Bostrom of the Applied Physics Laboratory of Johns Hopkins University. The instrument was turned off on 4 October 1991 because it was giving erroneous information.

== Mission termination ==
The IUE was designed to have a minimum lifetime of three years and carried consumables sufficient for a five-year mission. However, it lasted far longer than its design called for. Occasional hardware failures caused difficulties, but innovative techniques were devised to overcome them. For example, the spacecraft was equipped with six gyroscopes to stabilize the spacecraft. Successive failures of these in 1979, 1982, 1983, 1985 and 1996 ultimately left the spacecraft with a single functional gyroscope. Telescope control was maintained with two gyros by using the telescope's Sun sensor to determine the spacecraft's attitude, and stabilization in three axes proved possible even after the fifth failure, by using the Sun sensor, the Fine Error Sensors and the single remaining gyroscope. Most other parts of the telescope systems remained fully functional throughout the mission.

In 1995, budget concerns at NASA almost led to the termination of the mission, but instead the operations responsibilities were redivided, with ESA taking control for 16 hours a day, and GSFC for the remaining 8 only. The ESA 16 hours was used for science operations, while the GSFC 8 hours was used only for maintenance. In February 1996, further budget cuts led ESA to decide that it would no longer maintain the satellite. Operations ceased on 30 September 1996, and all the remaining hydrazine was discharged, the batteries were drained and switched off, and at 18:44 UTC on 30 September 1996, the radio transmitter was shut down and all contact with the spacecraft was lost.

It continues to orbit the Earth in its geosynchronous orbit and will continue to do so more or less indefinitely as it is far above the upper reaches of the atmosphere of Earth. Anomalies in the Earth's gravity due to its non-spherical shape meant that the telescope tended to drift West from its original location at approximately 70° West longitude towards approximately 110° West. During the mission, this drift was corrected by occasional rocket firings, but since the end of the mission the satellite has drifted uncontrolled to the West of its former location.

=== Archives ===
The IUE archive is one of the most heavily used astronomical archives. Data were archived from the start of the mission, and access to the archive was free to anyone who wished to use it. However, in the early years of the mission, long before the advent of the World Wide Web and fast global data transmission links, access to the archive required a visit in person to one of two Regional Data Analysis Facilities (RDAFs), one at the University of Colorado and the other at GSFC.

In 1987, it became possible to access the archive electronically, by dialing into a computer at Goddard Space Flight Center. The archive, then totaling 23 Gb of data, was connected to the computer on a mass storage device. A single user at a time could dial in and would be able to retrieve an observation in 10–30 seconds.

As the mission entered its second decade, plans were made for its final archive. Throughout the mission, calibration techniques were improved, and the final software for data reduction yielded significant improvements over earlier calibrations. Eventually, the entire set of available raw data was recalibrated using the final version of the data reduction software, creating a uniform high-quality archive. Today, the archive is hosted at the Mikulski Archive for Space Telescopes at Space Telescope Science Institute and is available via the World Wide Web and APIs.

=== Impact on astronomy ===
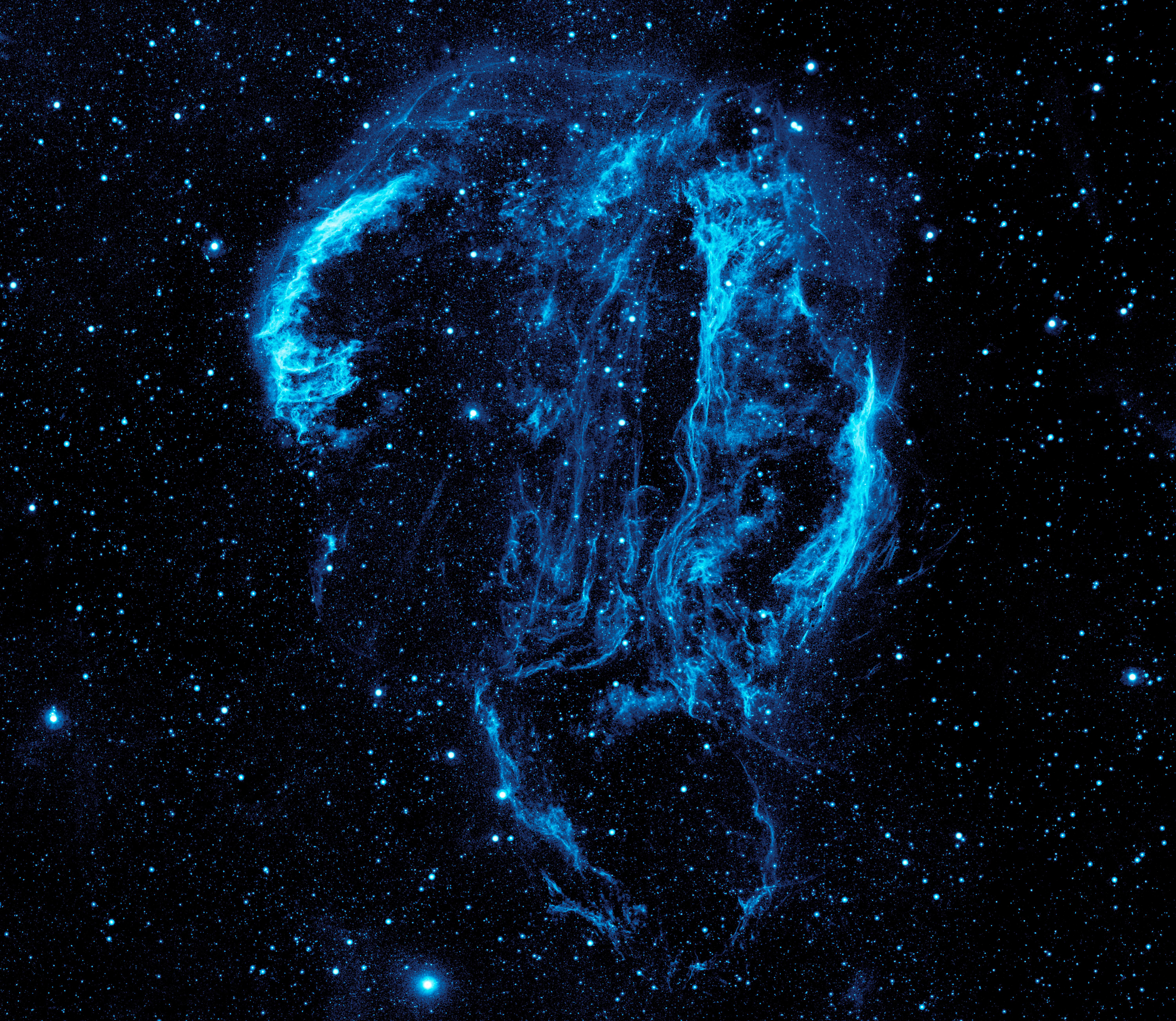
Ultraviolet view (mapped to blue visible light) of Cygnus Loop by a later ultraviolet telescope

The IUE mission, by virtue of its very long duration and the fact that for most of its lifetime, it provided astronomers only access to UV light, had a major impact on astronomy. By the end of its mission, it was considered by far the most successful and productive space observatory mission. For many years after the end of the mission, its archive was the most heavily used dataset in astronomy, and IUE data has been used in over 250 PhD projects worldwide. Almost 4,000 peer-reviewed papers have now been published based on IUE data, including some of the most cited astronomy papers of all time. The most cited paper based on IUE data is one analyzing the nature of interstellar reddening, which has subsequently been cited over 5,500 times.

The Hubble Space Telescope has now been in orbit for 31 years (as of 2021) and Hubble data has been used in almost 10,000 peer-reviewed publications at that time. In 2009, the Cosmic Origins Spectrograph was installed on HST by astronauts launched with the instrument by the Space Shuttle, and this device records ultraviolet spectrum, thus proving some ultraviolet observation ability in this period. Another ultraviolet space telescope, quite different in focus, was the wide-angle imaging GALEX space telescope operated between 2003 and 2013.

Some telescope visions such as Habex or Advanced Technology Large-Aperture Space Telescope (ATLAST) have included an ultraviolet capability, although it is not clear if they have any real prospects. In the 2010s, many telescope projects were struggling, and even some ground observatories saw their potential for being shut down ostensibly to save budget.

== See also ==
- Explorer program
- Timeline of artificial satellites and space probes
