= 460P/PanSTARRS =

Jupiter-family comet

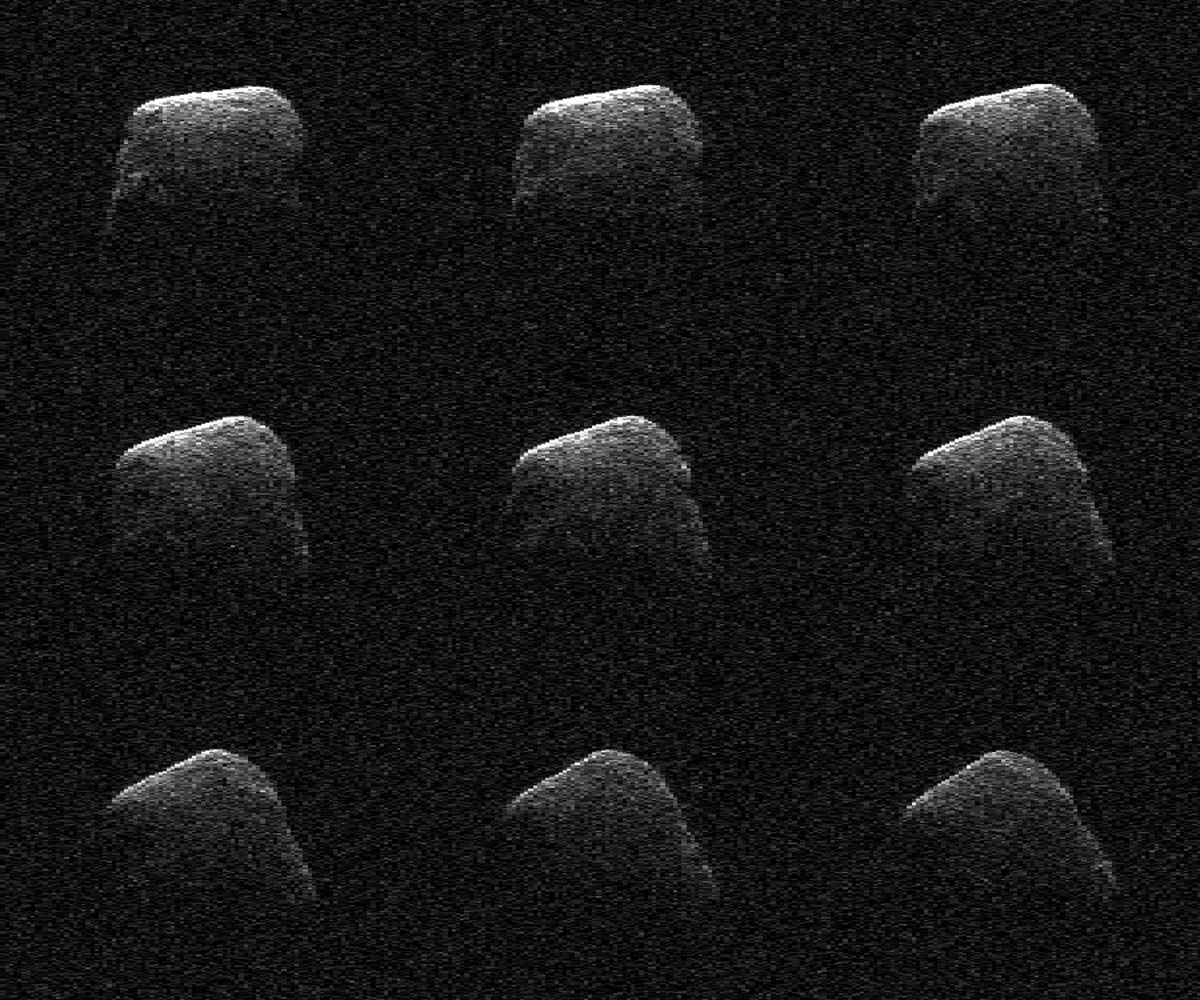
- Radar images of 460P/PanSTARRS from its 2016 Earth flyby

Discovery
- Discovered by: Pan-STARRS
- Discovery site: Haleakalā Observatory
- Discovery date: 22 January 2016

Designations
- MPC designation: P/2016 BA_{14} P/2020 U6
- Alternative designations: PanSTARRS 51

Orbital characteristics
- Epoch: 12 April 2016 (JD 2457490.5)
- Observation arc: 5.10 years (Note: Observation arc from the Minor Planet Center database covering dates from 1 December 2015 until 5 January 2021.)
- Earliest precovery date: 1 December 2015
- Number of observations: 1,885
- Aphelion: 5.036 AU
- Perihelion: 1.009 AU
- Semi-major axis: 3.022 AU
- Eccentricity: 0.6663
- Orbital period: 5.25 years
- Inclination: 18.919°
- Longitude of ascending node: 180.534°
- Argument of periapsis: 351.90°
- Mean anomaly: 36.425°
- Last perihelion: 21 September 2026
- Next perihelion: 31 December 2031
- T_{Jupiter}: 2.797
- Earth MOID: 0.016 AU
- Jupiter MOID: 0.094 AU

Physical characteristics
- Mean radius: 0.55–0.8 km (0.34–0.50 mi)
- Synodic rotation period: 36.6 hours
- Geometric albedo: 0.01–0.03
- Comet total magnitude (M1): 20.9

460P/PanSTARRS (also known with the provisional designation P/2016 BA_{14}) is a near-Earth object and a Jupiter-family comet with an orbital period of 5.25 years. In March 2016, it passed at distance of 2.2 million mi (3.5 million km; 9.2 LD) from Earth. It was the closest approach by a comet since 1770 and 3rd closest recorded comet to Earth. The close flyby enabled the size of the nucleus to be calculated at about 1 km (0.62 mi) in diameter, which was much bigger than expected. The comet is very dark, reflecting about 2-3 percent of the visible light, about the same as a charcoal briquette. It has a very similar orbit as numbered comet 252P/LINEAR, and may be related to it (e.g. split off of).. It was last observed in 2021 and came to perihelion in September 2026. It will return to perihelion in late December 2031.

== Observational history ==
The object when discovered on 22 January 2016 by a Pan-STARRS telescope, was thought to be an asteroid and went by the provisional minor planet designation 2016 BA_{14}. Astronomer Denis Denisenko noted the body's orbit was very similar to 252P/LINEAR, which led to a follow-up observation by the Lowell Discovery Telescope. The body showed a tail, identifying it as a probable comet and then named P/2016 BA_{14}. It was also observed by the 4.3 meter aperture Discovery Channel Telescope in Arizona.

The comet made a close flyby to Earth on 22 March 2016, at distance of 2.2 million mi (3.5 million km; 9.2 LD) from Earth, which was the closest approach by a comet since 1770 and 3rd closest recorded comet to Earth. That close flyby was an opportunity to study comets more closely. During the closest approach to Earth on 21 and 22 March 2016, the telescopes of Slooh offered views of P/2016 BA_{14} and 252P/LINEAR. The comet was also observed by radar.

The comet was recovered by R. Weryk in images obtained by the 1.8 m Ritchey–Chrétien telescope of Pan-STARRS on 17 October 2020, when it had an estimated apparent magnitude of 22.6, and was followed up to 5 January 2021. The comet during that apparition was given the provisional number P/2020 U6 (PanSTARRS).

== Orbit ==
460P/PanSTARRS is a Jupiter-family comet, indicating its aphelion is close to the orbit of Jupiter. The comet has an orbital period on 5.25 years and its perihelion is at 1.0128 AU (151.51 million km) for the 2021, while it was at 1.009 AU (150.9 million km) in 2016.

460P/PanSTARRS had the closest known approach of Earth by a comet since 1770, when Lexell's Comet is calculated to have passed within 1.4 million mi (2.3 million km) of Earth, and the third closest approach of a comet to Earth. Another close approach by a comet in modern times was C/1983 H1 (IRAS–Araki–Alcock).

After P/2016 BA_{14}'s flyby in 2016, it is calculated that is the closest it will be to Earth for at least the next 150 years. The comet approaches to 0.67 AU (100 million km) from Jupiter on 30 January 2034, which will result in an orbital change of the comet, with the perihelion distance increasing to 1.107 AU and the orbital period increasing to 5.43 years. The comet will approach Jupiter again on 6 July 2042, this time at a distance of 0.76 AU (114 million km). The orbit of the comet will change again, with perihelion distance decreasing to1.032 AU (154.4 million km) and the orbital period to 5.25 years. The next close flyby to Earth will take place at a distance of 0.052 AU (7.8 million km) on 14 March 2048.

The orbits of 460P/PanSTARRS and 252P/LINEAR show similarities, suggesting that 460P/PanSTARRS may have split off from 252P/LINEAR. Comet 252P/LINEAR had its close approach on 21 March 2016, and coming within 3.3 million mi (5.3 million km) made it the 5th closest approach by a comet.

== Scientific results ==
The close flyby in 2016 was an opportunity to study comets more closely. 460P/PanSTARRS was observed by the Goldstone Solar System Radar in California over three days, which revealed various properties including a rotation rate of 35–40 hours along one axis. The radar observations during the Earth flyby detected surface features as small as 8 m (26 ft), marking the highest resolution radar image of a comet. P/2016 BA_{14} was bigger than predicted when observed by astronomical radar; it was estimated to be perhaps 125 meters but was about 1.0 km (0.62 mi) in diameter. One reason it was hard to predict its size, is because it reflects less than 3% of the light, a very low albedo. There was no obvious sign of a coma.

NASA's Infrared Telescope Facility (IRTF) also made observations of P/2016 BA_{14}, revealing that P/2016 BA_{14} was reflecting only 2-3 percent of visible light. The observations of P/2016 BA_{14} with the NASA IRTF gave a diameter estimate of 0.6–1.2 km (0.37–0.75 mi), similar to the diameter reported by the radar observations. The comet was also observed in mid infrared by the Cooled Mid-Infrared Camera and Spectrometer in Subaru Telescope in Hawaii. The observations revealed that it is an inactive body covered by phyllosilicate and organic materials with a diameter of 800 m (2,600 ft).

During the 2016 flyby, activity level was measured both for 460P/PanSTARRS and 252P/LINEAR. 252P/LINEAR, despite having a smaller nucleus with diameter about 600 m, was much more active than 460P/PanSTARRS, about three to four orders of magnitude more. Hyland et al. did not detect gas emission from 460P, while Li et al. did detect CN emission on 17 April 2016 consistent with a production rate of (1.4±0.1)×10^{22} mol/s.

== Meteor shower ==
460P/PanSTARRS may produce meteor shower on 21 March 2023 between the hours of 00–04 UT. The radiant would be located near the bright star Canopus at (α = 6.0^{h} , δ = –51.0°). Meteors would have a slow entry speed of 17 km/s.

== Exploration ==
In 2019, 460P/PanSTARRS was listed as one of 10 backup targets of the European Space Agency's Comet Interceptor mission. Scheduled for launch on 2029, the spacecraft may conduct a flyby of 460P on 20 April 2037 if selected.

== Gallery ==
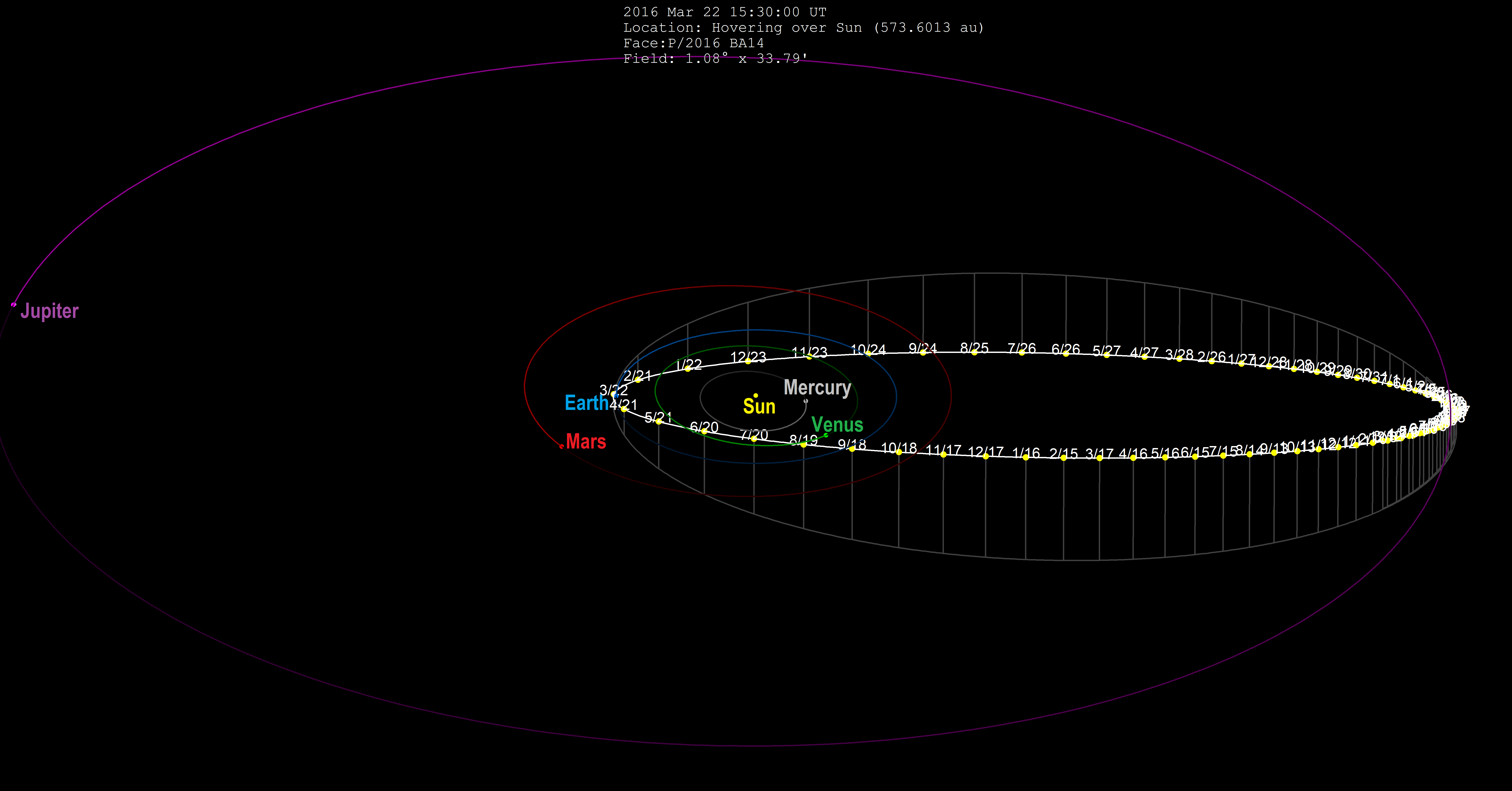
Orbit with 30 day motion

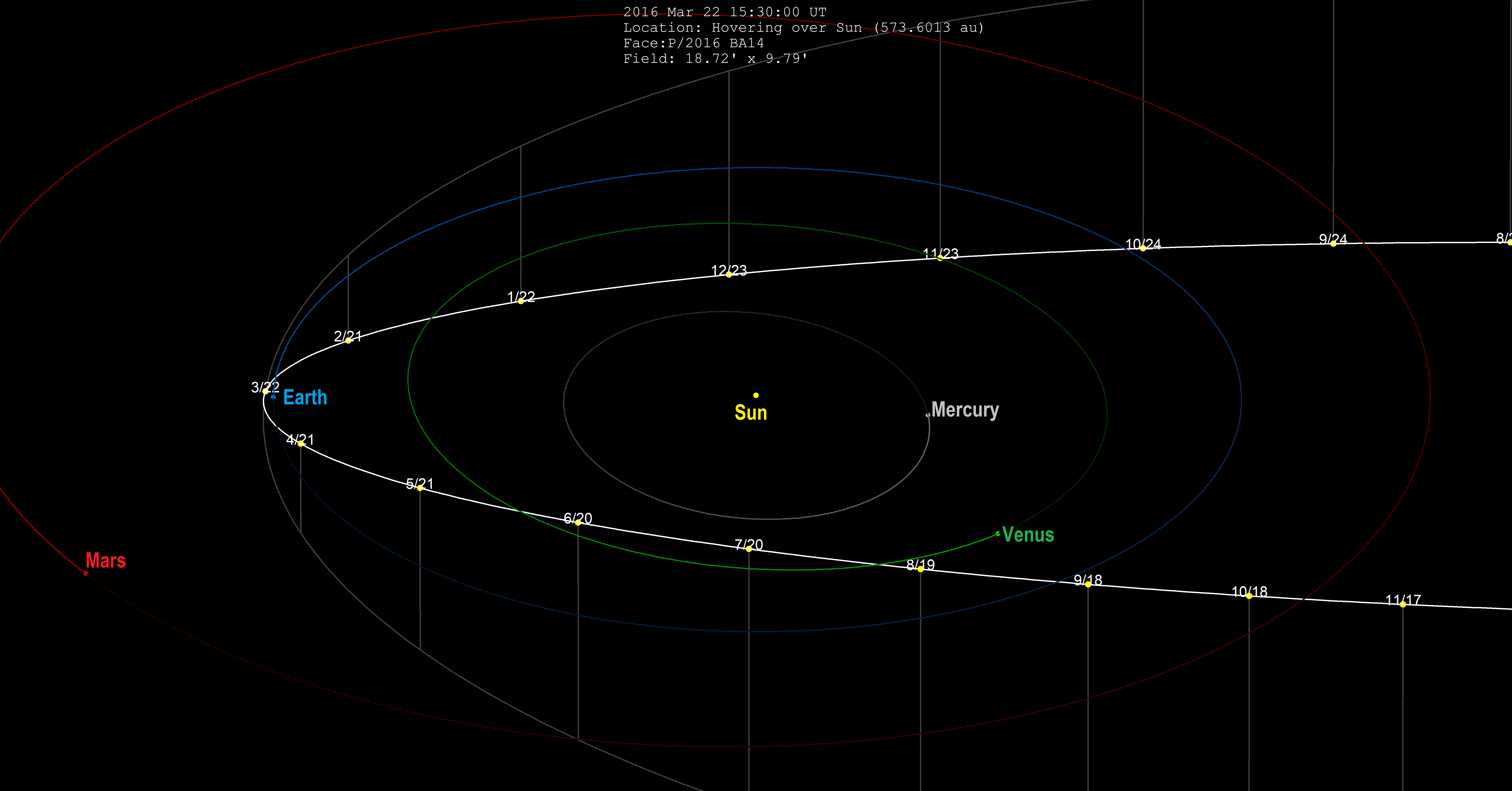
March 2016 flyby with 30 day motion

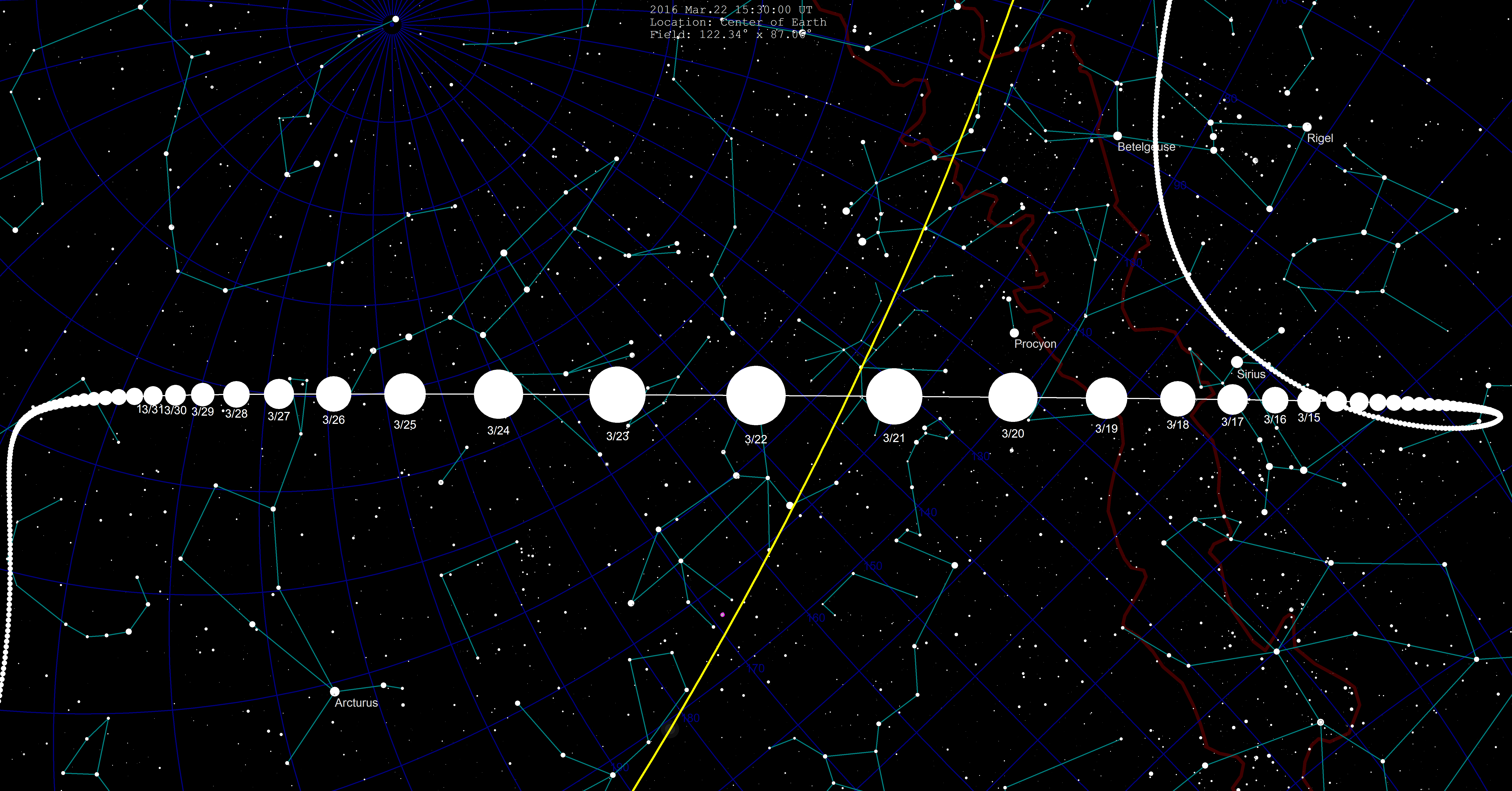
View of path from Earth with 1 day motion

== See also ==
- List of asteroid close approaches to Earth
- List of asteroid close approaches to Earth in 2016
- Near-Earth object
- C/2013 A1 (comet that passed close to planet Mars in 2014)
- 55P/Tempel–Tuttle (Earth close approach in 1366 (calculated))

== Notes ==
Numbered comets
Previous; 459P/Catalina	460P/PanSTARRS	Next; 461P/WISE
