= Comet Swift–Tuttle =

Halley-type comet and parent body of the Perseid meteors

109P/Swift–Tuttle
- Comet Swift-Tuttle photographed from the Heidelberg-Königstuhl State Observatory on 25 November 1992

Discovery
- Discovered by: Lewis Swift; Horace Parnell Tuttle
- Discovery date: 16–19 July 1862

Designations
- MPC designation: P/1737 N1; P/1862 O1; P/1992 S2
- Alternative designations: 1737 II; 1862 III; 1992 XXVIII

Orbital characteristics
- Epoch: 4 December 1995 (JD 2448960.5)
- Observation arc: 2,064 years (Note: Observation arc from the Minor Planet Center database only covered dates from 2 July 1737 until 5 April 1995 (257.76 years). This figure includes its entire arc up to 69 BC.)
- Earliest precovery date: 69 BC
- Number of observations: 892
- Aphelion: 51.225 AU
- Perihelion: 0.9595 AU
- Semi-major axis: 26.092 AU
- Eccentricity: 0.9632
- Orbital period: 133.28 years
- Max. orbital speed: 42.6 km/s (26.5 mi/s) (Note: v = 42.1219 √1/r − 0.5/a, where r is the distance from the Sun, and a is the semimajor axis.)
- Min. orbital speed: 0.8 km/s (0.50 mi/s) (2059-Dec-12)
- Inclination: 113.45°
- Longitude of ascending node: 139.44°
- Argument of periapsis: 153.00°
- Last perihelion: 12 December 1992
- Next perihelion: 12 July 2126
- T_{Jupiter}: –0.280
- Earth MOID: 0.001 AU

Physical characteristics
- Mean diameter: 26 km (16 mi)
- Synodic rotation period: 67.3±2.6 hours
- Comet total magnitude (M1): 4.5
- Comet nuclear magnitude (M2): 8.5

Orbital period at different passages
Perihelion date	Orbital period (years)
2392-09-16	132.7
2261-08-10	134.6
2126-07-12	136.2
1992-12-12	135.0
1862-08-23	131.7
1737-06-15	127.8
1610-02-06	130.5
1479-10-18	133.4
1348-05-02	135.0

Comet Swift–Tuttle (formally designated 109P/Swift–Tuttle) is a large periodic comet with a 1995 (osculating) orbital period of 133 years that is in a 1:11 orbital resonance with Jupiter. It fits the classical definition of a Halley-type comet, which has an orbital period between 20 and 200 years. The comet was independently discovered by Lewis Swift on 16 July 1862 and by Horace Parnell Tuttle on 19 July 1862.

Its nucleus is 26 km (16 mi) in diameter. Swift–Tuttle is the parent body of the Perseid meteor shower, perhaps the best known shower and among the most reliable in performance.

The comet made a return appearance in 1992, when it was rediscovered by Japanese astronomer Tsuruhiko Kiuchi and became visible with binoculars. It was last observed in April 1995 when it was 8.6 AU (1.3 billion km) from the Sun. In 2126, it will likely be a bright naked-eye comet, potentially reaching an apparent magnitude of about 0.7.

== Historical observations ==
Older passages
CE/BCE	Date
188 CE	188–07–10
69 BCE	–68-08-27
322 BCE	–321-09-27

Chinese records indicate that, in 188, the comet reached apparent magnitude 0.1. Observation was also recorded in 69 BCE, and it was probably visible to the naked eye in 322 BCE.

In the discovery year of 1862, the comet was as bright as Polaris.

After the 1862 observations, it was incorrectly theorized that the comet would return between 1979 and 1983. However, it had been suggested in 1902 that this was the same comet as that observed by Ignatius Kegler on 3 July 1737 and on this basis Brian Marsden calculated correctly that it would return in 1992.

== Orbit ==
Animation of 109P/Swift–Tuttle orbit from 1850 to 2150 ( Sun · Earth · Jupiter · Saturn · Uranus · 109P/Swift–Tuttle)

Animation of 109P/Swift–Tuttle's close approach to Earth in 2126

The comet's perihelion is just under that of Earth, while its aphelion is just over that of Pluto. An unusual aspect of its orbit is that it was recently captured into a 1:11 orbital resonance with Jupiter; it completes one orbit for every 11 of Jupiter. It was the first comet in a retrograde orbit to be found in a resonance. In principle this would mean that its proper long-term average period would be 130.48 years, as it librates about the resonance. Over the short term, between epochs 1737 and 2126 the orbital period varies between 128 and 136 years. However, it only entered this resonance about 1000 years ago, and will probably exit the resonance in several thousand years.

=== Threat to Earth ===
The comet is on an orbit that makes repeated close approaches to the Earth–Moon system, and has an Earth-MOID (Minimum orbit intersection distance) of 0.0009 AU (0.13 million km; 0.084 million mi). Upon its September 1992 rediscovery, the comet's date of perihelion passage was off from the 1973 prediction by 17 days. It was then noticed that if its next perihelion passage (July 2126) was also off by another 15 days (July 26), the comet could impact the Earth or the Moon on 14 August 2126.

Distance of Comet Swift–Tuttle from Earth in Astronomical Units and millions of kilometres (gigametres) from 800 BCE to 2500 CE. Approaches in the shaded area are not visible to the unaided eye (apparent magnitude fainter than 3.4). The dashed line shows approximately the current year.

Given the size of the nucleus of Swift–Tuttle, this was of some concern. This prompted amateur astronomer and writer Gary W. Kronk to search for previous apparitions of this comet. He found the comet was most likely observed by the Chinese at least twice, first in 69 BCE and later in 188 CE; these two sightings were quickly confirmed by Brian Marsden and added to the list of perihelion passages at the Minor Planet Center. Around 25 July 188 CE the comet passed about 0.129 AU (19.3 million km) from Earth.

This information and subsequent observations have led to recalculation of its orbit, which indicates the comet's orbit is sufficiently stable that there is absolutely no threat over the next two thousand years. It is now known that the comet will pass 0.153 AU (22.9 million km; 14.2 million mi) from Earth on August 5, 2126. (Note: The 3-sigma uncertainty in the comet's closest approach to Earth on 5 August 2126 is about ±10 thousand km.) and within 0.147 AU (22.0 million km; 13.7 million mi) from Earth on August 24, 2261.

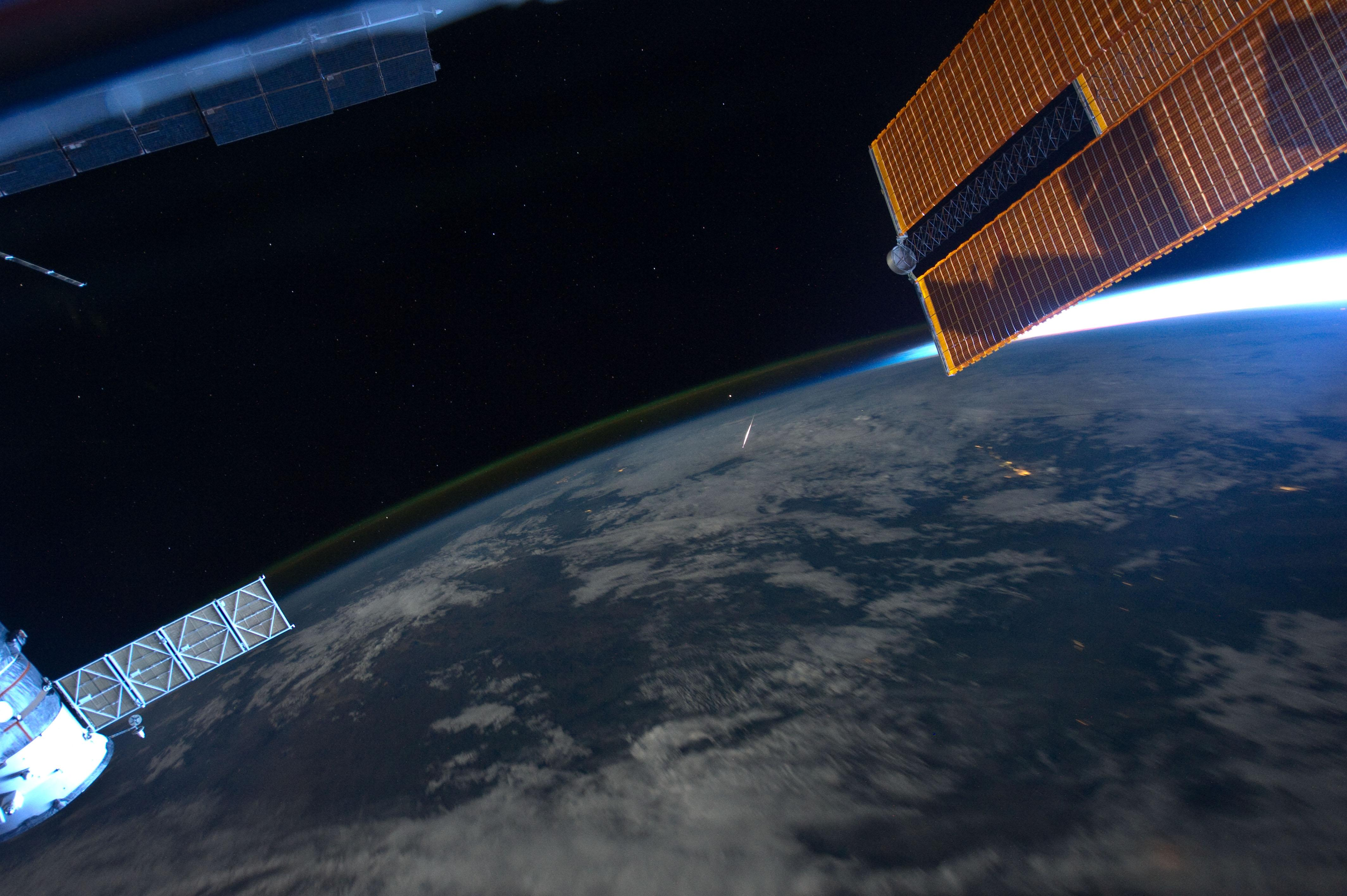
A Perseid meteor, originating from Comet Swift–Tuttle, from the ISS

A close encounter with Earth is predicted for the comet's return to the inner Solar System in the year 3044, with the closest approach estimated to be 0.011 AU (1.0 million mi; 1.6 million km). Another close encounter is predicted for the year 4479, around Sept. 15; the close approach is estimated to be less than 0.05 AU, with a probability of impact of 1 in a million. Subsequent to 4479, the orbital evolution of the comet is more difficult to predict; the probability of Earth impact per orbit is estimated as 2×10^{−8} (0.000002%).

Comet Swift–Tuttle is by far the largest near-Earth object (Apollo or Aten asteroid or short-period comet) to cross Earth's orbit and make repeated close approaches to Earth. With a relative velocity of 60 km/s, an Earth impact would have an estimated energy of ~27 times that of the Cretaceous–Paleogene impactor. (Note: This calculation can be carried out in the manner given by Weissman for Comet Hale–Bopp, as follows: A radius of 13.5 km and an estimated density of 0.6 g/cm^{3} gives a cometary mass of 6.2×10^{18} g. An encounter velocity of 60 km/s yields an impact velocity of 61 km/s, giving an impact energy of 1.15×10^{32} ergs, or 2.75×10^{9} megatons, about 27.5 times the estimated energy of the K–T impact event.) The comet has been described as "the single most dangerous object known to humanity". In 1996, the long-term possibility of Comet Swift–Tuttle impacting Earth was compared to 433 Eros and about 3000 other kilometer-sized objects of concern.

Comet Swift–Tuttle Closest Earth Approach on 2126-Aug-05 15:50 UT
Date & time of closest approach	Earth distance (AU)	Sun distance (AU)	Velocity wrt Earth (km/s)	Velocity wrt Sun (km/s)	Uncertainty region (3-sigma)	Reference
2126-08-05 15:50	0.15337 AU (22.944 million km; 14.257 million mi; 59.69 LD)	1.04 AU (156 million km; 97 million mi; 400 LD)	58.3	40.8	± 11000 km	Horizons

== See also ==
- Lists of comets
- List of interstellar comets
- List of comets by type
- List of non-periodic comets
- List of periodic comets

== Bibliography ==
- Siegel, Ethan (11 August 2016). "The Most Dangerous Object Known To Humanity". Forbes.

Numbered comets
Previous; 108P/Ciffreo	Comet Swift–Tuttle	Next; 110P/Hartley
