= Lexell's Comet =

Closest observed comet approach to Earth

D/1770 L1 (Lexell)
Discovery
- Discovered by: Charles Messier
- Discovery date: June 14, 1770

Designations
- Alternative designations: 1770 I

Orbital characteristics
- Epoch: 1770-Aug-14 (JD 2367764.5)
- Aphelion: 5.6184 ± 0.0409 AU
- Perihelion: 0.6746 ± 0.003 AU (before Jupiter encounter of 1779)
- Semi-major axis: 3.1465 ± 0.0206 AU
- Eccentricity: 0.7856 ± 0.0013
- Orbital period: 5.58 years (2039 days)
- Inclination: 1.550 ± 0.004°
- Longitude of ascending node: 134.50 ± 0.12
- Argument of periapsis: 224.98 ± 0.12
- Longitude of perihelion: 359.48 ± 0.24
- Last perihelion: August 14, 1770
- Next perihelion: unknown/Lost

Physical characteristics
- Dimensions: ~4.0–30.0 km (2.5–18.6 mi)

(529668) 2010 JL_{33}
Discovery
- Discovered by: MLS
- Discovery site: Mount Lemmon Obs.
- Discovery date: May 6, 2010

Designations
- Alternative designations: 2010 JL_{33} D/1770 L1 (Lexell) (possibly)
- Minor planet category: Apollo · NEO · PHA

Orbital characteristics
- Epoch 2022-Aug-09 (JD 2459800.5)
- Uncertainty parameter 0
- Observation arc: 22.75 yr (8,309 d)
- Earliest precovery date: 4 June 1997
- Aphelion: 4.649 AU
- Perihelion: 0.70971 AU
- Semi-major axis: 2.6793 AU
- Eccentricity: 0.73512
- Orbital period (sidereal): 4.39 yr (1,601 d)
- Mean anomaly: 250.87°
- Mean motion: 0° 13^{m} 28.56^{s} / day
- Inclination: 5.3772°
- Longitude of ascending node: 52.452°
- Longitude of perihelion: 2.32° (good match for Lexell)
- Time of perihelion: 7 December 2023
- Argument of perihelion: 309.87°
- Earth MOID: 0.031 AU (12 LD)
- Venus MOID: 0.00074 AU (110 thousand km)
- Mars MOID: 0.039 AU
- Jupiter MOID: 0.84 AU
- T_{Jupiter}: 2.911

Physical characteristics
- Mean diameter: 1.778±0.034 km
- Synodic rotation period: 9.443±0.002 h
- Geometric albedo: 0.047±0.009
- Absolute magnitude (H): 17.9

D/1770 L1, popularly known as Lexell's Comet after its orbit computer Anders Johan Lexell, was a comet discovered by astronomer Charles Messier in June 1770. (Note: Other comets named after their orbit computer, rather than discoverer, are 27P/Crommelin, 2P/Encke and 1P/Halley – Halley's Comet.) It is notable for having passed closer to Earth than any other comet in recorded history, approaching to a distance of only 0.015 astronomical units (2,200,000 km; 1,400,000 mi), or six times the distance from the Earth to the Moon. The comet is lost, having not been seen since 1770.

The passing of Lexell's Comet in 1770 holds the record for the closest observed approach to Earth by a comet. However, orbital calculations suggest it may have been beaten by a small sungrazing comet, P/1999 J6 (SOHO), which may have passed at about 0.012 AU (1,800,000 km; 1,100,000 mi) from Earth on June 12, 1999, but the uncertainties are around ±1.5 million km as the P/1999 J6 approach was unobserved.

== Discovery ==
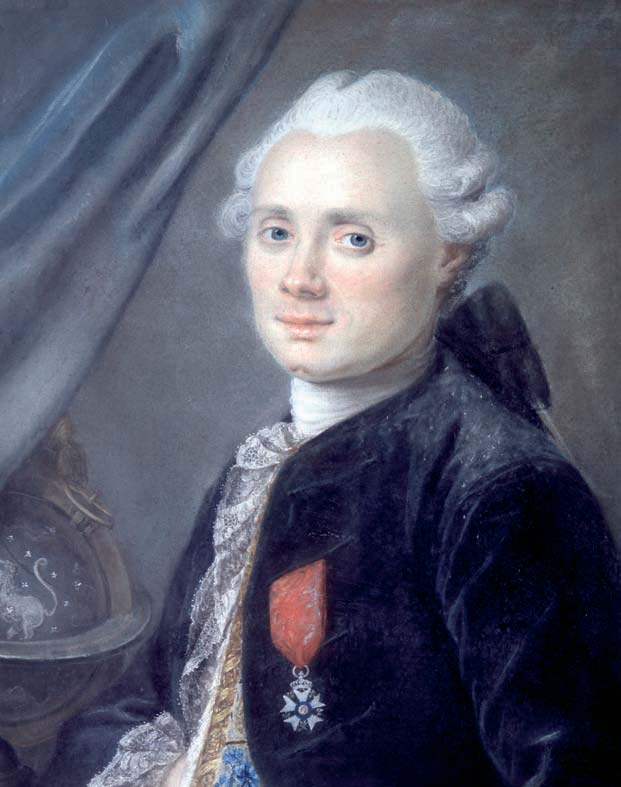
Charles Messier, who discovered Lexell's Comet

The comet was discovered on June 14, 1770, in the constellation Sagittarius by Messier, who had just completed an observation of Jupiter and was examining several nebulae. At this time it was very faint, but his observations over the course of the next few days showed that it rapidly grew in size, its coma reaching 27 arcminutes across by June 24: by this time it was of magnitude +2. The comet was also noted by several other astronomers.

The comet was observed in Japan. Surviving records identify it as an astronomical and historical phenomenon.

It was observed in the Hejaz in Safar 1184 AH (June 1770), where some believed it to be the comet predicted by the poet al-Fasi, portending future events.

== Close approach to Earth ==
On July 1, 1770, the comet passed 0.015 astronomical units from Earth, or approximately 6 times the radius of the Moon's orbit. Charles Messier measured the coma as 2° 23' across, around four times the apparent angular size of the Moon. An English astronomer at the time noted the comet crossing over 42° of sky in 24 hours; he described the nucleus as being as large as Jupiter, "surrounded with a coma of silver light, the brightest part of which was as large as the moon's orb".

Messier was the last astronomer to observe the comet as it moved away from the Sun, on October 3, 1770.

== Orbit ==
Scientists at the time largely believed that comets originated outside the Solar System, and therefore initial attempts to model the comet's orbit assumed a parabolic trajectory, which indicated a perihelion date (the date of the closest approach to the Sun) of August 9–10. When it turned out that the parabolic solution was not a good fit to the comet's orbit, Anders Johan Lexell suggested that the comet followed an elliptical orbit. His calculations, made over a period of several years, gave a perihelion of August 13–14 and an orbital period of 5.58 years. Lexell also noted that, despite this short-period orbit, by far the shortest known at the time, the comet was unlikely to have been seen previously because its orbit had been radically altered in March 1767 by the gravitational forces of Jupiter. It is, therefore, the earliest identified Jupiter family comet (as well as the first known near-Earth object).

After conducting further work in cooperation with Pierre-Simon Laplace, Lexell argued that a subsequent interaction with Jupiter in July 1779 had further perturbed its orbit, either placing it too far from Earth to be seen or perhaps ejecting it from the Solar System altogether. The comet likely no longer approaches any closer to the Sun than Jupiter's orbit.

Although Comet Lexell was never seen again, it remained interesting to astronomers. The Paris Academy of Sciences offered a prize for an investigation into the orbit of the comet. Johann Karl Burckhardt won in 1801, and confirmed the calculations of Lexell. He calculated that the 1779 close approach to Jupiter drastically altered its orbit and left it with a perihelion of 3.33 AU. In the 1840s, Urbain Le Verrier carried out further work on the comet's orbit and demonstrated that despite potentially approaching Jupiter as close as three and a half radii from the planet's centre the comet could never have become a satellite of Jupiter. He showed that after the second encounter with Jupiter many different trajectories were possible, given the uncertainties of the observations, and the comet could even have been ejected from the Solar System. This foreshadowed the modern scientific idea of chaos.

Lexell's work on the orbit of the comet is considered to be the beginning of modern understanding of orbit determination.

=== 2018 recalculation ===
In a 2018 paper, Quan-Zhi Ye et al. used recorded observations of the comet to recalculate the orbit, finding Le Verrier's 1844 calculations to be highly accurate. They simulated the orbit forwards to the year 2000, finding that 98% of possible orbits remained orbiting the Sun, 85% with a perihelion nearer than the asteroid belt, and 40% crossing Earth's orbit. The numbers remain consistent even when including non-gravitational parameters caused by pressures from a comet's jets.

Based on its apparent brightness in 1770, they estimate the comet to be between 4 and 50 kilometers in diameter, most likely less than 30. Additionally, based on a lack of meteor showers, they suggest that the comet may have ceased major activity before 1800.

== Identification ==
The aforementioned 2018 paper also attempted to identify if any discovered object may be a remnant of Lexell's comet. With an assumed size of >4 kilometers, it is highly unlikely that this comet would remain in the inner solar system and be undiscovered. Most new asteroids discovered even in the asteroid belt (as of 2018) are only 1–4 kilometers across. If Lexell's comet remains in the inner Solar System, it would most likely be an unidentified asteroid. The paper identified four potential asteroids which could be related: (529668) 2010 JL_{33} (99.2% chance), 1999 XK_{136} (74% chance), 2011 LJ_{1} (0.2% chance), and 2001 YV_{3} (~0% chance). The longitude of perihelion (a value that does not evolve much even over an extended period of time) of these asteroids are 2.32°, 6.22°, 356.98°, and 351.62°, respectively. For comparison, the longitude of perihelion of Lexell's comet was 359.48 ± 0.24°.

They find that 2010 JL_{33} is very likely to be a remnant of Lexell's comet, although due to a number of close approaches with Jupiter as well as uncertain non-gravitational parameters, a definite link cannot be made. 2010 JL_{33} will pass about 0.0227 AU (3.4 million km) from Venus on November 3, 2184.

== See also ==
- 460P/PanSTARRS – the closest comet flyby since Lexell, in 2016
