= Minimum orbit intersection distance =

Measure of close approach in astronomy

The orbit of (4953) 1990 MU, which, with a MOID of 0.0263 AU, is classified as a potentially hazardous object

Minimum orbit intersection distance (MOID) is a measure used in astronomy to assess potential close approaches and collision risks between astronomical objects. It is defined as the distance between the closest points of the osculating orbits of two bodies. Of greatest interest is the risk of a collision with Earth. Earth MOID is often listed on comet and asteroid databases such as the JPL Small-Body Database. MOID values are also defined with respect to other bodies as well: Jupiter MOID, Venus MOID and so on.

An object is classified as a potentially hazardous object (PHO) – that is, posing a possible risk to Earth – if, among other conditions, its Earth MOID is less than 0.05 AU. For more massive bodies than Earth, there is a potentially notable close approach with a larger MOID; for instance, Jupiter MOIDs less than 1 AU are considered noteworthy since Jupiter is the most massive planet.

A low MOID does not mean that a collision is inevitable as the planets frequently perturb the orbit of small bodies. It is also necessary that the two bodies reach that point in their orbits at the same time before the smaller body is perturbed into a different orbit with a different MOID value. Two objects gravitationally locked in orbital resonance may never approach one another. Numerical integrations become increasingly divergent as trajectories are projected further forward in time, especially beyond times where the smaller body is repeatedly perturbed by other planets. MOID has the convenience that it is obtained directly from the orbital elements of the body and no numerical integration into the future is used.

The only object that has ever been rated at 4 on the Torino Scale (since downgraded), the Aten asteroid (99942) Apophis, has an Earth MOID of 0.00026 AU (39,000 km; 24,000 mi). This is not the smallest Earth MOID in the catalogues; many bodies with a small Earth MOID are not classed as PHO's because the objects are less than roughly 140 meters in diameter (or absolute magnitude, H > 22). Earth MOID values are generally more practical for asteroids less than 140 meters in diameter as those asteroids are very dim and often have a short observation arc with a poorly determined orbit. As of September 2023, there have been seven objects detected and their Earth-MOID calculated before the Earth impact. The first two objects that were detected and had their Earth-MOID calculated before Earth impact were the small asteroids 2008 TC3 and 2014 AA. 2014 AA is listed with a MOID of 0.00000045 AU (67 km; 42 mi), and is the second smallest MOID calculated for an Apollo asteroid after 2020 QY2 with an Earth-MOID of 0.00000039 AU (58 km; 36 mi).

Potentially hazardous asteroids with Earth MOID < 0.0004 AU (~60,000 km or ~5 Earth diameters) include:
Object	Earth MOID (AU)	Size (m) (approximate)	(H)
2016 FG60	0.000076 AU (11,400 km; 7,100 mi)	300	21.1
(177049) 2003 EE16	0.000107 AU (16,000 km; 9,900 mi)	320	19.8
2012 HZ33	0.000131 AU (19,600 km; 12,200 mi)	260	20.4
2010 JE88	0.000148 AU (22,100 km; 13,800 mi)	180	21.5
(137108) 1999 AN10	0.000153 AU (22,900 km; 14,200 mi)	1300	17.9
2022 BX1	0.000177 AU (26,500 km; 16,500 mi)	170	21.7
2003 EG16	0.000179 AU (26,800 km; 16,600 mi)	490	19.4
2021 NQ5	0.000187 AU (28,000 km; 17,400 mi)	210	21.2
(442037) 2010 PR66	0.000238 AU (35,600 km; 22,100 mi)	695	19.3
(216985) 2000 QK130	0.000252 AU (37,700 km; 23,400 mi)	200	21.3
99942 Apophis	0.000257 AU (38,400 km; 23,900 mi)	370	19.7
(89958) 2002 LY45	0.000261 AU (39,000 km; 24,300 mi)	1300	17.2
(35396) 1997 XF11	0.000305 AU (45,600 km; 28,400 mi)	704	17.0
162173 Ryugu	0.000315 AU (47,100 km; 29,300 mi)	896	19.6
(143651) 2003 QO104	0.000321 AU (48,000 km; 29,800 mi)	2300	16.1
(85236) 1993 KH	0.000335 AU (50,100 km; 31,100 mi)	500	18.8
(471240) 2011 BT15	0.000368 AU (55,100 km; 34,200 mi)	150	21.4

Numbered periodic comets with Earth MOID < 0.02 AU (~3 million km) include:
Object	Epoch	Earth MOID (AU)
3D/Biela	1832	0.0005 AU (75,000 km; 46,000 mi; 0.19 LD)
109P/Swift–Tuttle	1995	0.0009 AU (130,000 km; 84,000 mi; 0.35 LD)
55P/Tempel–Tuttle	1998	0.0085 AU (1,270,000 km; 790,000 mi; 3.3 LD)
255P/Levy	2007	0.0088 AU (1,320,000 km; 820,000 mi; 3.4 LD)
15P/Finlay	2015	0.0092 AU (1,380,000 km; 860,000 mi; 3.6 LD)
73P–BW	2022	0.0093 AU (1,390,000 km; 860,000 mi; 3.6 LD)
252P/LINEAR	2016	0.0122 AU (1,830,000 km; 1,130,000 mi; 4.7 LD)
460P/PanSTARRS	2016	0.0163 AU (2,440,000 km; 1,520,000 mi; 6.3 LD)
289P/Blanpain	2019	0.0165 AU (2,470,000 km; 1,530,000 mi; 6.4 LD)
21P/Giacobini–Zinner	2017	0.0179 AU (2,680,000 km; 1,660,000 mi; 7.0 LD)

Some well known Main-belt asteroids with Earth MOID < 1 AU
Object	Earth MOID (Asteróide)
6 Hebe	0.975 AU (145.9 million km; 90.6 million mi; 379 LD)
7 Iris	0.850 AU (127.2 million km; 79.0 million mi; 331 LD)
8 Flora	0.873 AU (130.6 million km; 81.2 million mi; 340 LD)
12 Victoria	0.824 AU (123.3 million km; 76.6 million mi; 321 LD)
18 Melpomene	0.811 AU (121.3 million km; 75.4 million mi; 316 LD)
84 Klio	0.798 AU (119.4 million km; 74.2 million mi; 311 LD)
228 Agathe	0.657 AU (98.3 million km; 61.1 million mi; 256 LD)

== See also ==
- Asteroid impact prediction
- List of Mercury-crossing minor planets
- List of Venus-crossing minor planets
- List of Earth-crossing asteroids
- List of Mars-crossing minor planets
- List of Jupiter-crossing minor planets
