= Brorsen =

Brorsen may refer to:

- Søren Brorsen (1875–1961), Danish politician
- Theodor Brorsen (1819 – 1895), Danish astronomer
  - 23P/Brorsen-Metcalf, a periodic comet discovered by him
  - 3979 Brorsen, a main-belt asteroid named for him
  - 5D/Brorsen (also Comet Brorsen), a comet discovered by him
