= Lost comet =

Comet which was not detected during its most recent perihelion passage

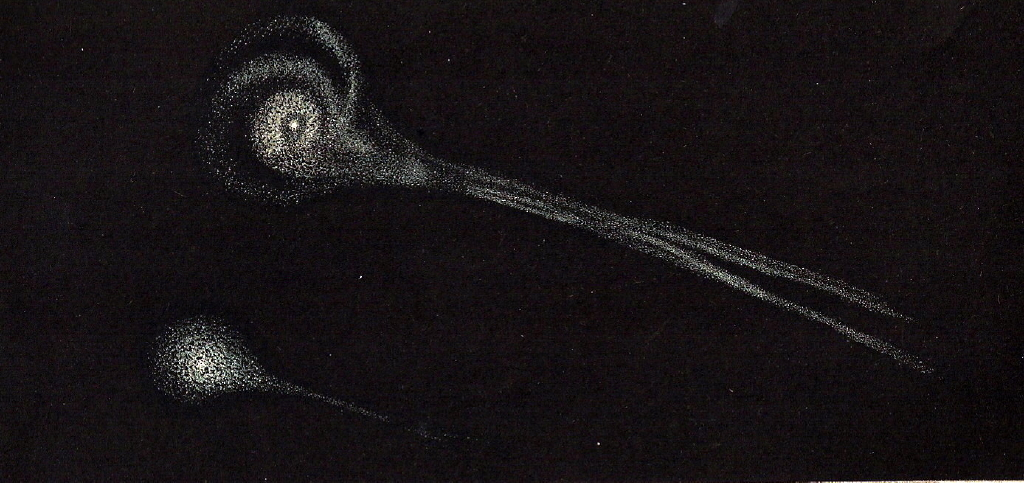
Biela's Comet was seen in two pieces in 1846, and has not been observed since 1852

A lost comet is one which was not detected during its most recent perihelion passage. This generally happens when data is insufficient to reliably calculate the comet's location or if the solar elongation is unfavorable near perihelion passage. The D/ designation is used for a periodic comet that no longer exists or is deemed to have disappeared.

Lost comets can be compared to lost asteroids (lost minor planets), although calculation of comet orbits differs because of nongravitational forces, such as emission of jets of gas from the nucleus. Some astronomers have specialized in this area, such as Brian G. Marsden, who successfully predicted the 1992 return of the once-lost periodic comet Swift–Tuttle.

== Overview ==
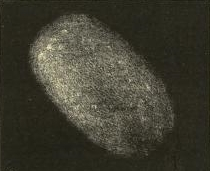
5D/Brorsen, which was lost after its 1879 apparition

=== Loss ===
There are a number of reasons why a comet might be missed by astronomers during subsequent apparitions. Firstly, cometary orbits may be perturbed by interaction with the giant planets, such as Jupiter. This, along with nongravitational forces, can result in changes to the date of perihelion. Alternatively, it is possible that the interaction of the planets with a comet can move its orbit too far from the Earth to be seen or even eject it from the Solar System, as is believed to have happened in the case of Lexell's Comet. As some comets periodically undergo "outbursts" or flares in brightness, it may be possible for an intrinsically faint comet to be discovered during an outburst and subsequently lost.

Comets can also run out of volatiles. Eventually most of the volatile material contained in a comet nucleus evaporates away, and the comet becomes a small, dark, inert lump of rock or rubble, an extinct comet that can resemble an asteroid (see Comets § Fate of comets). This may have occurred in the case of 5D/Brorsen, which was considered by Marsden to have probably "faded out of existence" in the late 19th century.

Material coming off Component B of 73P/Schwassmann–Wachmann, which broke up starting in 1995, as seen by the Hubble Space Telescope.

Comets are in some cases known to have disintegrated during their perihelion passage, or at other points during their orbit. The best-known example is Biela's Comet, which was observed to split into two components before disappearing after its 1852 apparition. In modern times 73P/Schwassmann–Wachmann has been observed in the process of breaking up.

=== Recovery ===
Occasionally, the discovery of an object turns out to be a rediscovery of a previously lost object, which can be determined by calculating its orbit and matching calculated positions with the previously recorded positions. In the case of lost comets this is especially tricky. For example, the comet 177P/Barnard (also P/2006 M3), discovered by Edward Emerson Barnard on June 24, 1889, was rediscovered after 116 years in 2006.

=== Long period comets ===
Comets can be gone but not considered lost, even though they may not be expected back for hundreds or even thousands of years. With more powerful telescopes it has become possible to observe comets for longer periods of time after perihelion. For example, Comet Hale–Bopp was observable with the naked eye about 18 months after its approach in 1997, and the James Webb Space Telescope observed Hale–Bopp in 2022, 25 years since last approach, when it was 46.2 AU from the Sun.

Comets that have been lost or which have disappeared have names beginning with a D, according to current naming conventions.

== List ==
Comets are typically observed on a periodic return. When they do not they are sometimes found again, while other times they may break up into fragments. These fragments can sometimes be further observed, but the comet is no longer expected to return. Other times a comet will not be considered lost until it does not appear at a predicted time. Comets may also collide with another object, such as Comet Shoemaker–Levy 9, which collided with Jupiter in 1994.

| Name(s) | Initially discovered | Period (years) | Last seen | Recovered | Fate |
|---|---|---|---|---|---|
| D/1766 G1 (Helfenzrieder) | 1766 | 4.35 | | | Uncertain orbit. Possibly perturbed by Jupiter after 1766 |
| D/1770 L1 (Lexell) | 1770 | 5.6 | | | Probably lost due to a 1779 close encounter with Jupiter which might have greatly perturbed the orbit or even ejected the comet from the Solar System. The asteroid (529688) 2010 JL_{33} is most likely its inert remnant. |
| 3D/Biela | 1772 | 6.6 | 1852 | | Broke up in two fragments (1846), then thousands, creating the Andromedids meteor shower |
| 226P/Pigott–LINEAR–Kowalski | 1783 | 7.2 | | 2003; 2009 | Lost shortly after discovery in 1783 due to uncertain orbit. Rediscovered after Richard Kowalski identified P/2009 R2 and P/2003 A1 as the same object as D/1783 W1 |
| 27P/Crommelin | 1818 | 27.9 | | 1928 | Three independent discoveries linked by Crommelin in 1930 |
| 289P/Blanpain | 1819 | 5.2 | | 2003 | Lost since 1819 discovery due to faintness; rediscovered in 2003 thanks to good viewing conditions; first identified as asteroid 2003 WY_{25}, subsequently matched to the 1819 comet after 184 years and 35 orbits; confirmed by observations in 2013 and 2014 near perihelion; probable source of the Phoenicids meteor shower observed since 1956 |
| 273P/Pons–Gambart | 1827 | 180 | | 2012 | Period of roughly 64±10 years originally computed in 1917 was wrong; rediscovered after 185 years in a single orbit; possibly matches a Chinese observation in 1110 |
| 54P/de Vico–Swift–NEAT | 1844 | 7.3 | 1894, 1965 | 2002 | Lost several times due to perturbations by Jupiter |
| 122P/de Vico | 1846 | 74.4 | | 1995 | Not observed on first predicted return in 1921; recovered in 1995 after 149 years and 2 orbits |
| 5D/Brorsen | 1846 | 5.5 | 1879 | | Lost since 1879 despite good orbit computations |
| 80P/Peters–Hartley | 1846 | 8.1 | | 1982 | Recovered in 1982 after 136 years and 17 orbits; regularly observed since then |
| 20D/Westphal | 1852 | 61.9 | 1913 | | Expected in 1976 but not observed; next possible return in 2038 |
| 109P/Swift–Tuttle | 1862 | 133.3 | | 1992 | Recovered after 130 years as predicted in 1971 by Brian G. Marsden; retroactively matched to observations of 1737 in Europe and 188 AD and 68 BC in China; source of the Perseids meteor shower |
| 55P/Tempel–Tuttle | 1865 | 33.2 | | 1965 | Recovered in 1965 after 99 years and 3 orbits; matches earlier observations of 1366 and 1699; source of the Leonids meteor shower |
| 9P/Tempel | 1867 | 5.59 | 1879 | 1967 | Recovered in 1967 after 88 years and 13 orbits. Visited by the Deep Impact and Stardust missions in 2005 and 2011 respectively. |
| 11P/Tempel–Swift–LINEAR | 1869 | 6.4 | 1908 | 2001 | Recovered in 2001 after 93 years and 15 orbits; not observed in 2008 due to solar conjunction but seen again in 2014 as predicted |
| X/1872 X1 (Pogson) | 1872 | | | | Originally mistaken as the recovery of Biela's Comet |
| 72P/Denning–Fujikawa | 1881 | 9.0 | 1978 | 2014 | Recovered in 1978 after 97 years and 11 orbits, then lost again and recovered in 2014 after 4 more orbits |
| X/1882 K1 (Tewfik) | 1882 | | | | Only seen once during the solar eclipse of May 17, 1882 |
| D/1884 O1 (Barnard) | 1884 | 5.39 | | | Possibly disintegrated after an outburst |
| 15P/Finlay | 1886 | 6.5 | 1926 | 1953 | Regularly observed since 1953 |
| D/1886 K1 (Brooks) | 1886 | 5.44 | | | Uncertain orbital period. Perihelion increased from 1.3 to 1.9 AU |
| 64P/Swift–Gehrels | 1889 | 9.41 | | 1973 | Recovered after 84 years and 9 orbits. Regularly observed since 1981 |
| 177P/Barnard | 1889 | 118.8 | | 2006 | Recovered after 117 years in a single orbit |
| 206P/Barnard–Boattini | 1892 | 5.8 | | 2008 | Recovered in 2008 after 116 years and 20 orbits; not seen on predicted return in 2014; not observed in 2021 due to low magnitude; next perihelion in 2027 |
| 17P/Holmes | 1892 | 6.9 | 1906 | 1964 | Regularly observed since 1964; large outburst in 2007 |
| 489P/Denning | 1894 | 9.4 | 2007 | 2024 | Identified in 2024 as the asteroid 2007 HE_{4} |
| D/1895 Q1 (Swift) | 1895 | 7.2 | 1896 | | Several perturbations by Jupiter. Shattered remains possibly encountered by Mariner 4 in 1967 |
| 205P/Giacobini (D/1896 R2) | 1896 | 6.7 | | 2008 | Recovered in 2008 after 112 years and 17 orbits; seen in 2015 as predicted; three visible fragments |
| 18D/Perrine–Mrkos | 1896 | 6.75 | 1909, 1968 | 1955 | Lost after 1909, recovered in 1955 and lost again since 1968 |
| 113P/Spitaler | 1890 | 7.1 | | 1993 | Recovered in 1993 after 103 years and 15 orbits; regularly observed since 1994 perihelion |
| 97P/Metcalf–Brewington | 1906 | 10.5 | | 1991 | Recovered in 1991 after 84 years and 11 orbits; orbital period lengthened by Jupiter in 1993 |
| 69P/Taylor | 1915 | 6.95 | | 1976 | Recovered in 1976 after 61 years and 9 orbits; regularly observed since 1977 perihelion |
| 25D/Neujmin | 1916 | 5.4 | 1927 | | Only seen twice; lost since 1927 |
| D/1918 W1 (Schorr) | 1918 | 6.66 | | | Perihelion increased from 1.9 to 3.0 AU |
| C/1921 H1 (Dubiago) | 1921 | 70.0 | | | Was not observed on its 1982 apparition |
| 34D/Gale | 1927 | 11.0 | 1938 | | Only seen twice; lost since 1938 |
| 73P/Schwassmann–Wachmann | 1930 | 5.4 | | 1979 | Broke up into 4 fragments in 1995 and dozens in 2006, yielding the Tau Herculids meteor shower |
| 57P/du Toit–Neujmin–Delporte | 1941 | 6.4 | | 1970 | Recovered in 1970 after 29 years and 5 orbits; observed regularly since 1983 |
| 79P/du Toit–Hartley | 1945 | 5.28 | | 1982 | Recovered in 1982 after 37 years and 7 orbits; regularly observed since 1987 |
| 107P/Wilson–Harrington | 1949 | 4.3 | | 1992 | Lost for 30 years; rediscovered as a Mars-crosser asteroid in 1979; equated with the lost comet in 1992 while searching for precovery images |
| 325P/Yang–Gao | 1951 | 6.69 | | 2020 | Discovered in 2009, Maik Meyer and Gary W. Kronk later identified a previously lost comet called X/1951 K1 as a previous apparition of Yang–Gao after reanalysis of photographic plates in 2020. |
| C/1951 G2 (Groeneveld–Palomar) | 1954; 1978 | | 1952 | | Reanalysis of photographic plates in 2023 revealed that both previously lost comets X/1951 G2 and X/1952 C1 were the same object. |
| D/1952 B1 (Harrington–Wilson) | 1952 | 6.35 | | | Intrinsically faint. Perihelion increased from 1.65 to 1.9 AU |
| 271P/van Houten–Lemmon | 1960 | 18.47 | | 2012 | Lost due to uncertain orbit. Rediscovered by the Mount Lemmon Survey as P/2012 TB_{36} |
| 85D/Boethin | 1975 | 11.2 | 1986 | | Only seen twice; lost since 1986 (expected in 1997 and 2008 but not observed), officially demoted in 2017 |
| 75D/Kohoutek | 1975 | 6.6 | 1988 | | Only seen three times; lost since 1988 |
| D/1977 C1 (Skiff–Kosai) | 1977 | 7.54 | | | Perihelion decreased slightly |
| 157P/Tritton | 1978 | 6.4 | | 2003 | Recovered in 2003 after 25 years and 4 orbits; regularly observed since then |
| D/1978 R1 (Haneda–Campos) | 1978 | 5.98 | | | Only seen once. Intrinsically faint, perihelion increased from 1.1 to 1.3 AU |
| X/1978 W1 | 1978 | | | | |
| X/1979 O2 | 1979 | | | | |
| X/1979 O3 | 1979 | | | | |
| 83D/Russell | 1979 | 6.1 | 1985 | | Only seen twice; lost since 1985, probably due to a close encounter with Jupiter in 1988 |
| 143P/Kowal–Mrkos | 1984 | 10.51 | | 2000 | Recovered in 2000 after two orbits, rediscovered as the asteroid 2000 ET_{90}. |
| 449P/Leonard | 1987 | 6.8 | | 2020 | Identified in 2022 as a rediscovery of a previously lost comet, X/1987 A2 |
| D/1993 F2 (Shoemaker–Levy) | 1993 | | 1994 | | Fragments collided with Jupiter in July 1994 |

== See also ==
- Brian G. Marsden, comet-orbit expert
- Extinct comet
- List of periodic comets
- List of non-periodic comets
- Lost asteroids
- Stanton A. Coblentz, author of The Lost Comet (1964)
- C/2019 Q4 (Borisov) (thought to be interstellar comet, disc. 2019)
