= Weinek =

Weinek is a surname. Notable people with the surname include:

- Ladislaus Weinek (1848–1913), Austro-Hungarian astronomer
  - 7114 Weinek, a main-belt asteroid
  - Weinek (crater), a lunar crater
- Martin Weinek (born 1964), an Austrian actor, wine producer, entrepreneur and entertainer

== See also ==
- Weinegg
