= Comet Neujmin =

Comet Neujmin may refer to any of the comets below that were discovered by Georgian/Russian astronomer, Grigory N. Neujmin, between 1913 and 1941:

- 25D/Neujmin 2
- 28P/Neujmin 1
- 42P/Neujmin 3
- 57P/du Toit–Neujmin–Delporte
- 58P/Jackson–Neujmin
- C/1914 M1 (Neujmin)
