= Altona Observatory =

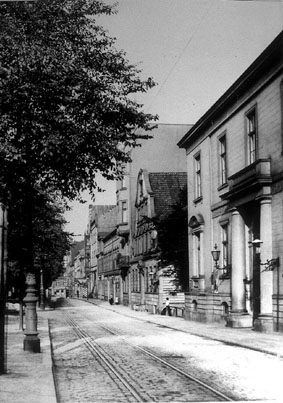
- The house (center) behind which Heinrich Christian Schumacher constructed the original Altona Observatory (photo c. 1890)
- Observatory code: 527
- Location: Palmaille, Altona, Hamburg, Germany
- Coordinates: 53°32′42.1″N 9°56′35.2″E
- Established: 1823
- Closed: 1871

The Altona Observatory (German: Sternwarte Altona) was an astronomical observatory situated in the Palmaille, in Altona, Hamburg. The observatory was founded by Heinrich Christian Schumacher in 1823 and continued to operate until 1871, 21 years after his death. It closed due to funding being cut off following the cession of the 'Elbe Duchies' of Schleswig, Holstein, and Saxe-Lauenburg by Denmark to Austria and Prussia following the Second Schleswig War.

The Astronomische Nachrichten journal was founded at the observatory by Schumacher and was edited there until the observatory's closure.

== History ==
=== Foundation ===
In 1815 Heinrich Christian Schumacher initiated a large-scale geodetic survey of Jutland, stretching from Skagen to Lauenburg. To connect the Danish measurements with the greater European geodetic network, Schumacher involved Carl Friedrich Gauss, who in 1818 began his own survey of the Kingdom of Hanover. To connect both networks, a fundamental station was needed in Altona.

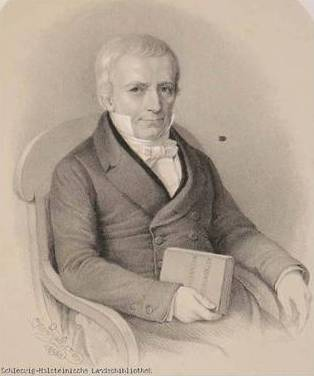
Heinrich Christian Schumacher, lithograph by Otto Speckter (1853)

In 1821 Schumacher acquired a house situated in the Palmaille, in Altona, Hamburg, which was then under Danish administration. In the garden plot behind it, which fell steeply towards the Elbe river and allowed a wide view of the area, he erected the Altona Observatory to house the necessary fundamental station. The royal administration agreed to provide the observatory with an annual budget, under the condition that Schumacher would live and work in Altona until his death. From the windows of the house several survey markers in the south, as well as the tower of St. Michael's Church in the east, could be sighted. A friend of Schumacher's, Johann Georg Repsold, set up a meridian circle in the observatory.

In 1823, at the suggestion of the Danish Prime Minister Johan Sigismund von Møsting, Schumacher founded the Astronomische Nachrichten journal, one of the first scientific journals in the field of astronomy. Contributions by well-respected astronomers such as Carl Friedrich Gauss, Friedrich Bessel, and William Herschel made the journal, which still publishes to this day, the mouthpiece of the astronomical community.

In the 1840s, the Altona-Kiel Railway Company established a 105 km railway line between Altona and the port city of Kiel. It was found, however, that the endpoints of the lines had a time difference in exact astronomical time of about 40 seconds due to their distance. Depending on what time was adopted a train between Altona and Kiel could be considered to have arrived nearly a minute too early or too late, even if it was really on time. To address this problem, the railway, in collaboration with the Altona Observatory and Schumacher, developed an artificial medium time for its timetable, reducing the maximum variation from true geographic time to 20 seconds, which was considerably less noticeable.

This issue appeared with all railways as travel distances and speeds increased, eventually leading to the convening of the International Meridian Conference in October 1884 in Washington, D. C., which agreed to adopt a universal day for astronomical purposes, leading to the world being split into time zones independent of precise astronomical time.

The observatory continued to make observations throughout the 1840s, with Johann Friedrich Julius Schmidt sighting many astronomical objects in the constellation of Virgo, and Adolph Cornelius Petersen, who later became director, sighting NGC 2194, among others, in 1849. The comet 23P/Brorsen–Metcalf was discovered by Theodor Brorsen at the observatory on 20 July 1847.

=== Schumacher's death ===
During the First Schleswig War, the home of Schumacher, who was a royalist Danish official, was surrounded by soldiers and he was placed under house arrest. He died 2 years later, at the end of 1850.

Immediately following Schumacher's death, the financial department of Kiel intended to close the observatory. Kiel University planned to establish its own observatory and the Hamburg Observatory already existed nearby, making the Altona Observatory redundant. Furthermore, air pollution from factories that were springing up throughout Altona was affecting observations. A lack of funds saw much of the observatory's equipment being sold to the University of Copenhagen and to Kiel University, as well as to the navy. Its library went to a Berlin antiquarian, although some works were later repurchased.

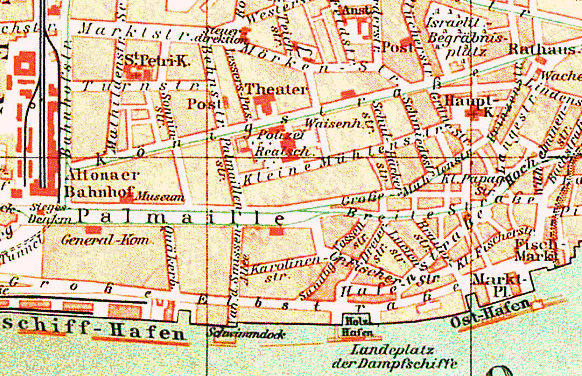
Map showing the Palmaille c. 1890

Schumacher's long-time colleague Adolph Cornelius Petersen was appointed as a temporary director while it was being decided what course of action should be taken. Petersen notably lacked any foreign language skills and struggled to deal with the upkeep of the Astronomische Nachrichten journal, which published material from all over Europe. He took language lessons but died shortly after his rise to directorship, in 1854.

Finally, a Danish commission decided that the observatory should continue to operate for the time being. In 1854 Christian August Friedrich Peters, who had previous experience working at the Hamburg, Pulkovo, and Königsberg observatories, was appointed as the new director. He continued to publish Astronomische Nachrichten, with 58 volumes appearing during his time. Its quality, however, dropped significantly. Peters disliked Russian astronomers and frequently quarrelled with his German counterparts, leading to the journal being shunned by the greater astronomical community.

In 1864 the 'Elbe Duchies' of Schleswig, Holstein, and Saxe-Lauenburg were ceded by Denmark to Austria and Prussia following the Second Schleswig War. The new rulers cut off financial support to the observatory and it was decided that it should be abandoned in favour of constructing a new observatory at Kiel. In 1871 construction plans and surveys were completed and Peters moved with his family to Kiel. Work began in the spring of 1874 and, following an unusually hasty construction, was completed by October of the same year. Most of the instruments of the Altona Observatory were transferred to the new building.

The home behind which the original observatory was built was destroyed in 1941 during a World War II bombing raid. Today, the German Federal Research Center for Fisheries stands in its place.

== Telescopes ==
- Meridian circle with 10.38 cm aperture
  - The Altona meridian circle was constructed around 1822 by a company owned by T. L. Ertel and Georg Friedrich von Reichenbach. It is of the same size as the ones supplied to the Königsberg and Tartu observatories, which were established around the same period.
- Repsold telescope with an equatorial mount
- Refracting telescope with 11.7 cm aperture and 1.95 m focal length built in 1865

== See also ==
- Geodesy
- List of astronomical observatories
