= 25D =

25D may refer to:

- 25D/Neujmin, a periodic comet in the Solar System
- Learjet 25D
- New York State Route 25D
- 25d, a model of the BMW X1 (E84) automobile
