= X/1872 X1 (Pogson) =

Lost comet

Discovery
- Discovered by: N. R. Pogson
- Discovery site: Madras, India
- Discovery date: 3 December 1872

Designations
- Alternative designations: KM1872-1

Orbital characteristics
- Observation arc: 1 day
- Number of observations: 2
- Perihelion: 0.0637 AU
- Eccentricity: ~1.000
- Inclination: 148.44°
- Longitude of ascending node: 48.76°
- Argument of periapsis: 63.43°
- Last perihelion: 16 December 1872

Physical characteristics
- Apparent magnitude: 6.3 (1872 apparition)

X/1872 X1, occasionally referred to as "Pogson's Comet", was a probable cometary astronomical object seen from Madras (now Chennai) on December 3 and 4, 1872, by astronomer N. R. Pogson.

Pogson believed the object to be the lost Comet Biela, but subsequent orbital calculations have suggested that this was unlikely. Neither Biela's Comet nor Pogson's object have been recovered since, and the episode remains one of the most puzzling in solar system astronomy.

== Discovery and observations ==
Pogson's observations were triggered by a great meteor shower (later known as the Andromedids) seen on November 27, 1872: its radiant was observed to be located in a part of the sky which Biela's Comet, last seen in 1852, had been predicted to cross in September, and it was speculated that it might be associated with the comet. As a result, the astronomer Ernst Friedrich Wilhelm Klinkerfues sent a telegram to Pogson, at the Madras Observatory, stating that "Biela touched Earth on 27th: search near Theta Centauri".

Pogson began searching for the comet at around 4 a.m. local time on the 3rd, after cloudy weather had hampered observations for two nights. The clouds broke up for a period of around ten minutes, and at 05.15 he spotted an object, "evidently cometary at the first glance", which he recorded as "circular, bright, with a decided nucleus": he identified it to his satisfaction as Biela's Comet by comparing its rate of motion against background stars. On the following morning he made further observations under better conditions, stating that the apparent comet now had a short tail. The morning of the 5th was cloudy, and Pogson immediately dispatched several letters noting his observations and giving three detailed positions, although admitting he had failed to spot the second of the two cometary heads seen on the previous observed return of Comet Biela.

== Analysis ==
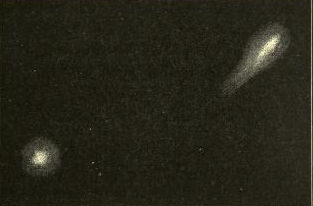
Primary and secondary components of Biela's Comet, drawn by Secchi on its final observed return in 1852. Pogson's object was initially thought to be a recovery of Biela.

Pogson's observation quickly attracted academic attention. The amateur astronomer Lt-Col. George Lyon Tupman, writing in the January 1873 Monthly Notices, noted problems with both the positions of Pogson's "comet" compared to that of Biela and the 12-week difference between Pogson's observations and the projected orbit of Biela: however, he conceded that the difference in inclination could be explained if Pogson had seen the secondary comet of Biela on the 3rd and the primary on the 4th.

A number of orbits were subsequently published for Pogson's object by Karl Bruhns (1875) and Heinrich Kreutz (1886 and 1902), but being based on only three positions are rather speculative. If the object seen by Pogson was a comet, it has not been detected since.

The Irish astronomer William Henry Stanley Monck was later to suggest that "the comets of Pogson and Biela may belong to the same family and may co-operate in producing the same diffused meteor shower". He was also to suggest that a possible comet seen by James Buckingham on 9 November 1865 might have been the same object as that seen by Pogson, and suggested an 1893 return, which did not occur.

Patrick Moore was later to comment of Pogson's observations that "[he] was a highly experienced observer [...] so there seems little room for error. On the other hand, it is inconceivable that the comet was Biela's; it must have been another, quite unconnected, merely happening to lie in the same region of the sky – an almost incredible coincidence." The writer Amédée Guillemin described this coincidence as "a very striking, I might almost say, romantic episode in astronomical history".

As Pogson was the only observer, Brian G. Marsden did not list it on the third and fourth editions of his book, the Catalogues of Cometary Orbits. However, Gary W. Kronk includes it as part of the second volume of his book, the Cometography: A Catalog of Comets.

== See also ==
- Lost comet
