= NGC 2194 =

Open cluster in the constellation Orion

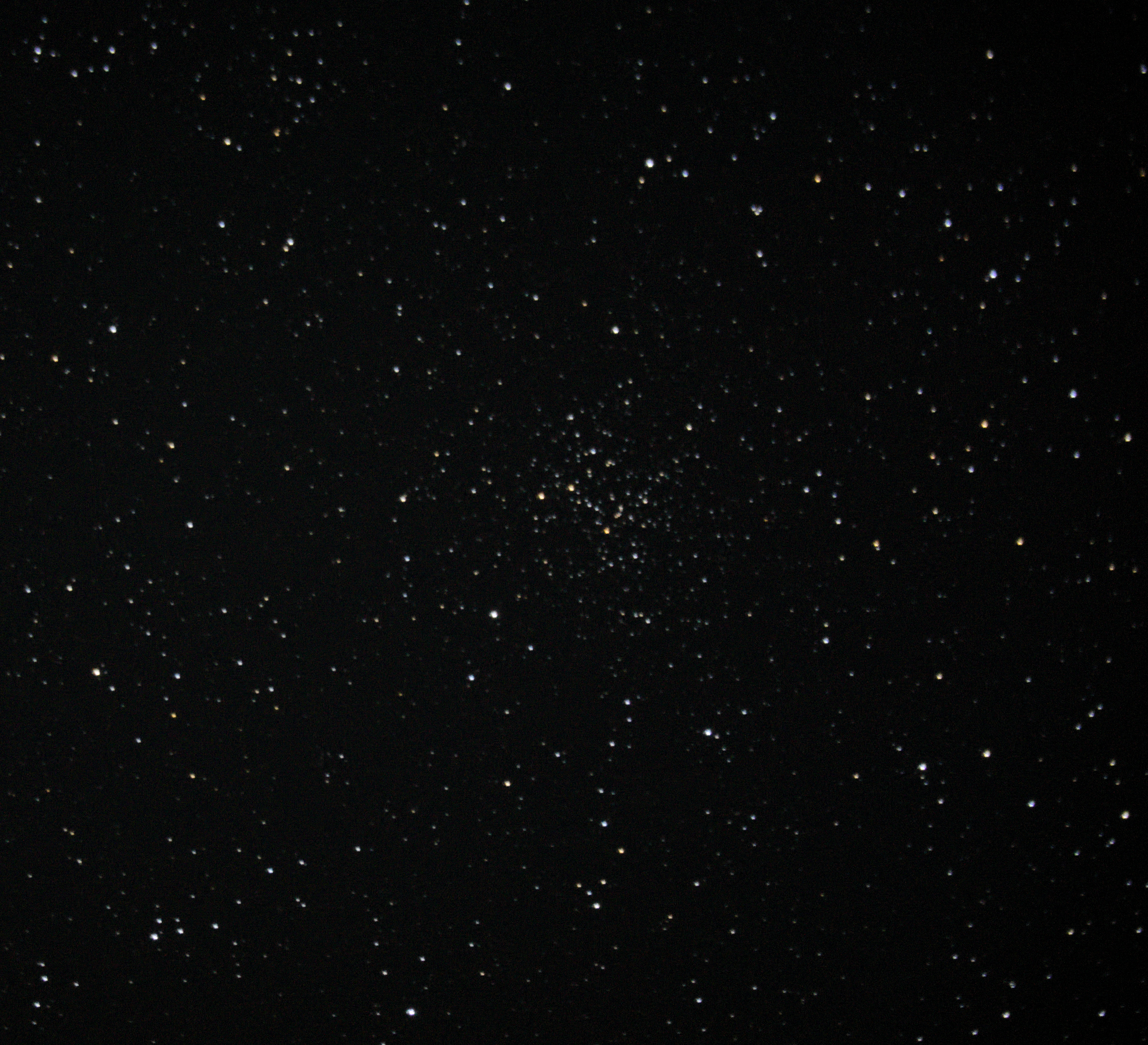
- Amateur astrophotography of NGC 2194

Observation data (J2000 epoch)
- Right ascension: 06^{h} 13^{m} 46^{s}
- Declination: +12° 49′ 05″
- Distance: 3,510 ly (1,076 pc)
- Apparent magnitude (V): 8.5
- Apparent dimensions (V): 9′

Physical characteristics
- Estimated age: 30 million years
- Other designations: Cr 87, Mel 43

Associations
- Constellation: Orion

NGC 2194 is an open cluster of stars in the constellation of Orion. The cluster is located about 10,000 light years away from Earth. It is rich and moderately concentrated. The cluster lies 33 arcminutes west-northwest of 73 Orionis.

== Observation history ==
It was discovered by William Herschel on 11 February 1784, and it was added in his catalogue as IV 5. It was added to the General Catalogue as 1383. The cluster was also observed by Adolph Cornelius Petersen in 1849 with the 18 cm refractor at the Altona Observatory. The cluster was also observed by Hermann Carl Vogel, without mentioning its General Catalogue number. John Louis Emil Dreyer added it to GCS as number 5380, as Heinrich Louis d'Arrest's discovery from 18 September 1862, without noticing it was already included.

== Characteristics ==
NGC 2194 is a rich and moderately concentrated, with Trumpler class III1r, open cluster. The brightest stars of the cluster are of magnitude 10, the brightest being of magnitude 10.26. The cluster has 149 members down to 15th magnitude. The main sequence turn off is at magnitude 14.5 and there are few red giants members. There are some stars that are bluer than the turn-off point and if they are members of the cluster they are possibly blue stragglers. The photometric study of the cluster by Sanner and al. concluded that the age of the cluster is 550 Myr and its distance is 2,900 pc. Piatti et al. determined the age of the cluster to be 400 Myr and its distance to be 3,200 pc. The cluster has low metallicity (−0.27 ± 0.06). It is located 130 pc south of the galactic plane.

== Research ==
In the summer of 2025, NASA SEES interns Abdullah Pehlari, Luis Aceves-Ramirez, Yashica Balasubramanian, Rodrigo Burguete, Ashwin Krishnamurthy, and Cindy Wang conducted a photometric study of NGC 2194. Using broadband B (blue), V (visual/green), and R (red) filters with exposure times of 3 and 120 seconds, they analyzed 817 stars within the cluster. Their results revised the cluster’s distance to 1,076.17 parsecs (3,510 ly) and determined an age of about 30 million years, substantially younger than previous estimates.

To study the stellar distribution, the researchers divided NGC 2194 into concentric regions centered on the cluster. The densest concentration of stars was found in the inner region, predominantly consisting of F-, G-, K-, and numerous M-type stars with temperatures ranging from approximately 2,000 to 7,000 K. Moving outward, the second and third regions were dominated by A- and F-type stars (~7,500–10,000 K), although cooler G- and K-type stars were also present, and a small number of O- and B-type stars were detected. The fourth and fifth regions were more sparsely populated, primarily by cooler K- and M-type stars. Surrounding the cluster, an outer halo contained faint K- and M-type stars.

A color–magnitude diagram (CMD) and Hertzsprung–Russell (H–R) diagram revealed that most stars lie along the main sequence, confirming that they are in the hydrogen-fusion stage. A clear turnoff point near spectral type B–A indicated where the more massive stars are beginning to evolve off the main sequence. Comparison with zero-age main sequence (ZAMS) models yielded a cluster age of approximately 30 million years.

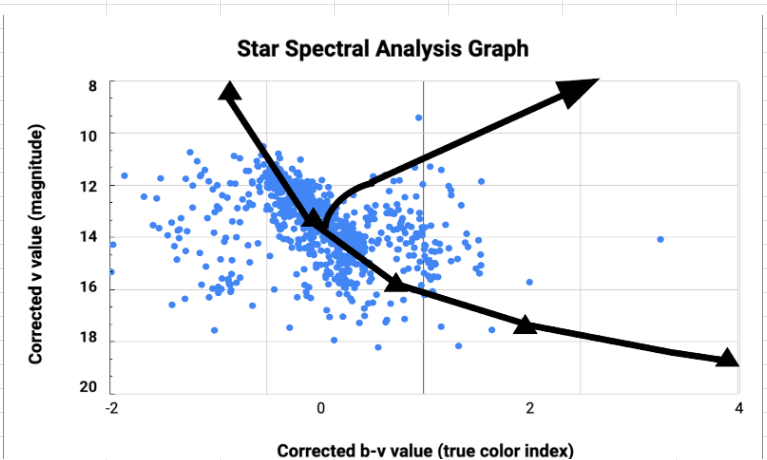
Hertzsprung–Russell diagram of NGC 2194, generated from photometric data collected by NASA SEES interns in 2025.

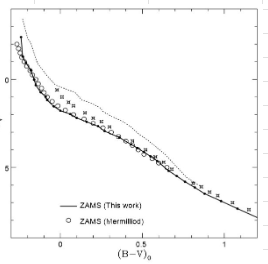
Zero-age main sequence (ZAMS) fitting of NGC 2194, produced by NASA SEES interns in 2025.

The full dataset of 817 stars, including magnitudes, corrected color indices, and spectral classifications, has been archived and is publicly available for further analysis.

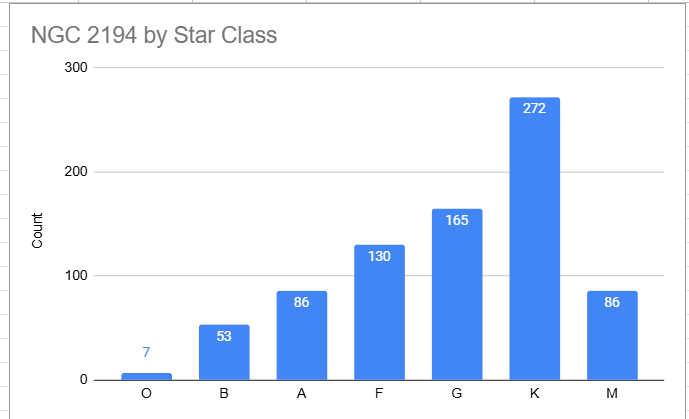
Distribution of stellar spectral classes across the concentric regions of the open cluster NGC 2194, based on the 2025 NASA SEES intern photometric study.

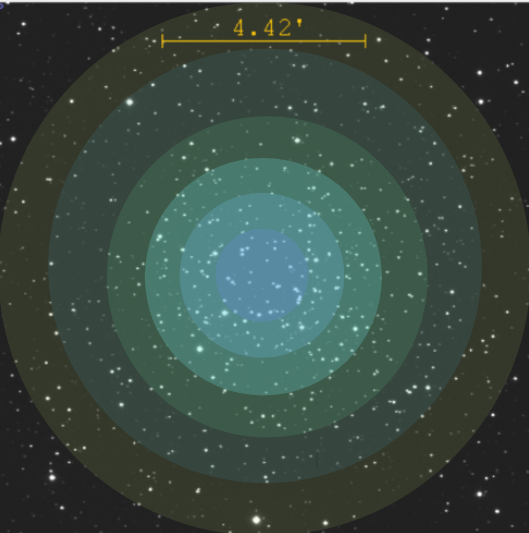
Illustration of the concentric regions (Inner, Second, Third, Fourth, Fifth, and Outer) used in the NASA SEES 2025 research of NGC 2194.
