= 971 Alsatia =

Main-belt asteroid

Discovery
- Discovered by: A. Schaumasse
- Discovery site: Nice Obs.
- Discovery date: 23 November 1921

Designations
- Pronunciation: /ælˈseɪʃə/
- Named after: Alsace (French province)
- Alternative designations: 1921 LF · 1961 AA; A908 UE
- Minor planet category: main-belt · (middle) background EUN–(interloper)

Orbital characteristics
- Epoch 4 September 2017 (JD 2458000.5)
- Uncertainty parameter 0
- Observation arc: 108.67 yr (39,693 days)
- Aphelion: 3.0666 AU
- Perihelion: 2.2182 AU
- Semi-major axis: 2.6424 AU
- Eccentricity: 0.1605
- Orbital period (sidereal): 4.30 yr (1,569 days)
- Mean anomaly: 86.606°
- Mean motion: 0° 13^{m} 46.2^{s} / day
- Inclination: 13.774°
- Longitude of ascending node: 83.539°
- Argument of perihelion: 6.2645°

Physical characteristics
- Dimensions: 55.31±13.87 km 60.71±0.88 km 60.867±0.527 km 62.92±0.58 km 63.75±1.7 km 64.724±0.657 km
- Synodic rotation period: 6.81±0.01 h 9.600±0.007 h 9.606±0.001 h 9.61±0.02 h 9.614±0.003 h (Note: Lightcurve plot of 971 Alsatia, Palmer Divide Observatory, Brian D. Warner (2011). Quality code of 3. Summary figures at the LCDB)
- Geometric albedo: 0.0403±0.0078; 0.0415±0.002; 0.043±0.006; 0.046±0.002; 0.046±0.005; 0.05±0.02
- Spectral type: SMASS = C B–V = 0.669; U–B = 0.298
- Absolute magnitude (H): 10.05 · 10.11±0.10 · 10.21

971 Alsatia, provisional designation 1921 LF, is a carbonaceous background asteroid from the central region of the asteroid belt, approximately 60 kilometers (37 miles) in diameter. It was discovered on 23 November 1921, by French astronomer Alexandre Schaumasse at Nice Observatory in southeastern France. The asteroid was named after the French province Alsace.

== Orbit and classification ==
Alsatia is a non-family asteroid of the main belt's background population when applying the Hierarchical Clustering Method to its proper orbital elements. It has also been dynamically classified as a member of the Eunomia family (502), which has a different spectral type though. This suggests that Alsatia may be an interloper to that family.

It orbits the Sun in the central main-belt at a distance of 2.2–3.1 AU once every 4 years and 4 months (1,569 days). Its orbit has an eccentricity of 0.16 and an inclination of 14° with respect to the ecliptic.

The body's observation arc begins with its first identification as A908 UE at Heidelberg Observatory in October 1908, more than 13 years prior to its official discovery observation at Nice.

== Physical characteristics ==
In the SMASS classification, Alsatia is a carbonaceous C-type asteroid.

=== Rotation period ===
Several rotational lightcurves of Alsatia have been obtained from photometric observations by Robert Stephens (2000), Laurent Bernasconi (2005), astronomer at the Oakley Southern Sky Observatory (2011), Brian Warner (2011), and Daniel Klinglesmith (2017). Lightcurve analysis gave a consolidated rotation period of 9.614 hours with a brightness amplitude of 0.17 to 0.29 magnitude (U=2/2/2/3/3-).

=== Diameter and albedo ===
According to the surveys carried out by the Infrared Astronomical Satellite IRAS, the Japanese Akari satellite and the NEOWISE mission of NASA's Wide-field Infrared Survey Explorer, Alsatia measures between 55.31 and 64.724 kilometers in diameter and its surface has an albedo between 0.0403 and 0.05.

The Collaborative Asteroid Lightcurve Link adopts the results obtained by IRAS, that is, an albedo of 0.0415 and a diameter of 63.75 kilometers based on an absolute magnitude of 10.05.

== Naming ==
This minor planet was named after the French province Alsace (regained from Germany after the WWI) in northeast France between the Rhine river and the Vosges mountains. In 1922, the discoverer proposed the name Alsace. However, the Astronomical Calculation Institute, then responsible for the naming of minor planets, changed the name in Alsatia. The political status of Alsace has been heavily influenced by historical decisions, wars, and strategic politics.
