= 24P/Schaumasse =

Jupiter-family comet

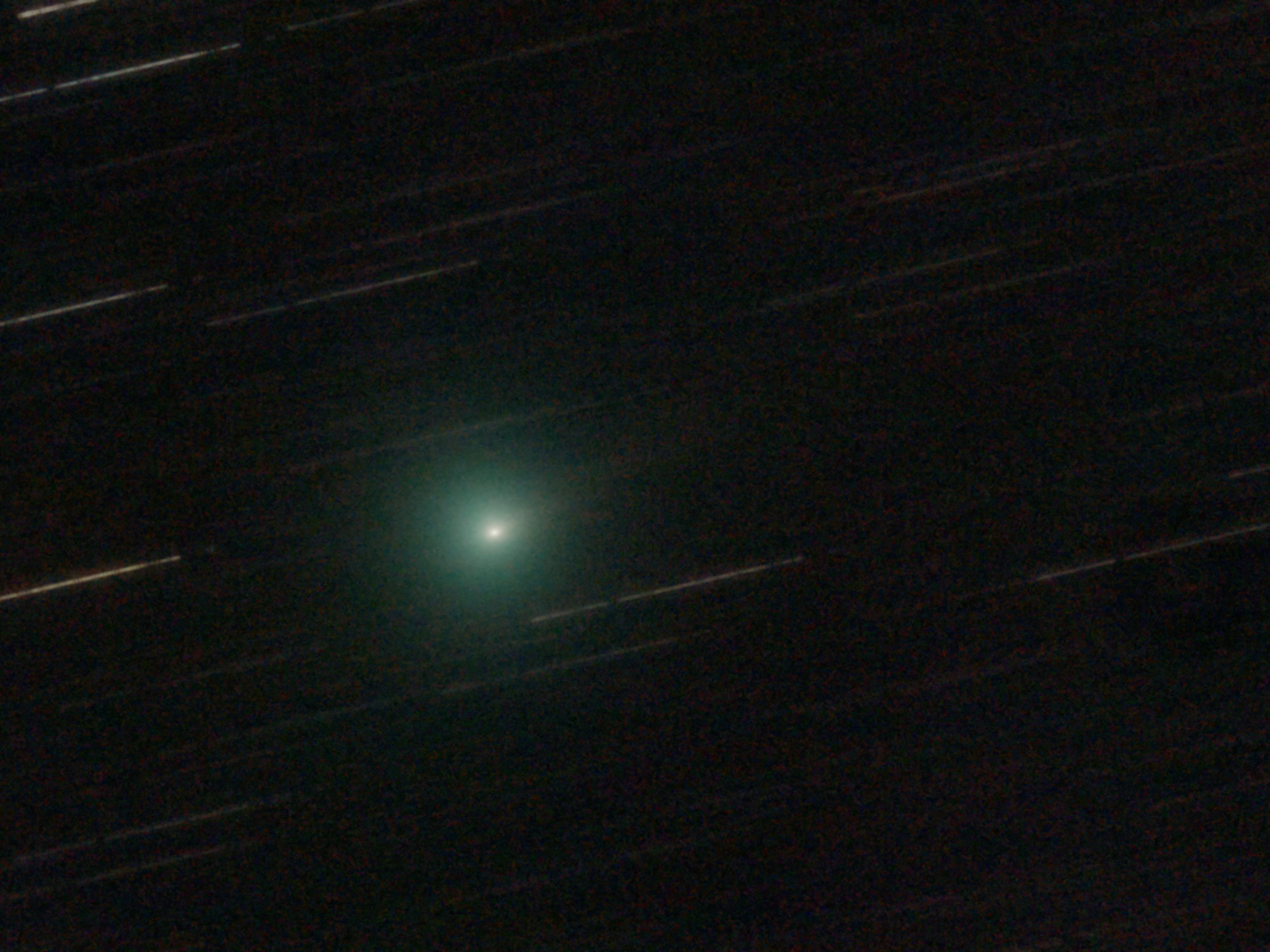
- Comet Schaumasse imaged on 29 December 2025

Discovery
- Discovered by: Alexandre Schaumasse
- Discovery site: Nice, France
- Discovery date: 1 December 1911

Designations
- MPC designation: P/1911 X1, P/1919 U1
- Alternative designations: 1911 VII, 1919 IV; 1927 VIII, 1943 V, 1952 III; 1960 III, 1976 XV; 1984 XXII, 1993 III

Orbital characteristics
- Epoch: 21 November 2025 (JD 2461000.5)
- Observation arc: 114.59 years (Note: Observation arc from the Minor Planet Center database only covered dates from 30 September 1930 until 5 July 2026 (95.76 years). This figure includes its entire arc up to 1 December 1911.)
- Number of observations: 4,317
- Aphelion: 6.93 AU
- Perihelion: 1.184 AU
- Semi-major axis: 4.06 AU
- Eccentricity: 0.708
- Orbital period: 8.18 years
- Inclination: 11.50°
- Longitude of ascending node: 78.27°
- Argument of periapsis: 58.48°
- Mean anomaly: 354.2°
- Last perihelion: 8 January 2026
- Next perihelion: 16 March 2034
- T_{Jupiter}: 2.504
- Earth MOID: 0.263 AU (39.3 million km)
- Jupiter MOID: 0.465 AU (69.6 million km)

Physical characteristics
- Mean radius: 0.91 km (0.57 mi)
- Comet total magnitude (M1): 14.6
- Comet nuclear magnitude (M2): 15.6
- Apparent magnitude: 10.5 (2026-02-15)

Comet Schaumasse is a Jupiter-family comet roughly 2 km in diameter with an 8.2-year orbit around the Sun. It is the first of three comets discovered by French astronomer, Alexandre Schaumasse. (Note: His other comet discoveries were C/1913 J1 (Schaumasse) and C/1917 H1 (Schaumasse).) It last came to perihelion on 8 January 2026 and will next return on 16 March 2034.

== Observations ==
By the end of 1912 it was recognised as a short period comet estimated to return in 7.1 years, later recalculated as 8 years. The 1919 return was recovered by Gaston Fayet (Paris, France) as magnitude 10.5.

The 1927 approach was magnitude 12, but the comet was missed on the 1935 approach. In 1937, it passed close to Jupiter which increased its orbital period slightly. The comet reached magnitude 15 on its 1943-1944 apparition. During the 1951-1952 apparition, the comet was brighter than expected, reaching a magnitude of about 6 in February.

The comet was missed in 1968 and 1976. It was speculated that the increase in brightness in 1952 indicated a problem that led to it vanishing. The comet during the 1984 apparition was recovered by James B. Gibson (Palomar Observatory, California, USA). Also in 1984 was reported that Elizabeth Roemer (Steward Observatory, Arizona, USA) had found a comet on a photograph from 27 December 1976. Orbital calculations by Brian G. Marsden, confirmed the 1976 image featured Comet Schaumasse.

The comet was not observed during the 2009 unfavorable apparition since the perihelion passage occurred when the comet was on the far side of the Sun. It passed within 0.025 AU (4 million km) of the dwarf planet Ceres on 22 March 2010. During the 2017 apparition the comet reached a magnitude of 10.

On 25 October 2025, it passed about 1 degree from Jupiter. It came to perihelion on 8 January 2026 with a solar elongation of 94 degrees and brightened to about magnitude 9. Two small outbursts, which brightened the comet by 0.7 and 1.1 magnitudes respectively, were recorded on March and May 2026.

24P/Schaumasse closest Earth approach on 2026-Jan-04
Date & time of closest approach	Earth distance (AU)	Sun distance (AU)	Velocity wrt Earth (km/s)	Velocity wrt Sun (km/s)	Uncertainty region (3-sigma)	Reference
2026-Jan-04	0.5933 AU (88.76 million km; 55.15 million mi; 230.9 LD)	1.185 AU (177.3 million km; 110.2 million mi; 461 LD)	18.9	35.8	± 100 km	Horizons

Around 25 October 2100 it should pass about 0.17 AU (25 million km) from Mars.

== Physical characteristics ==
Initial light-curve analysis in 1994 by James V. Scotti revealed that the nucleus of 24P/Schaumasse is estimated to be about 2.6 km (1.6 mi) in diameter. Mid-infrared spectra taken by Martha S. Hanner supported this measurement. Newer calculations in 2006, based on its nuclear magnitude (M2) and water production rate, revised this value to 1.82 km (1.13 mi).

Spectroscopic analysis of the comet in 1992 detected emissions of CN, C_{3}, C_{2} and NH within its coma, where significant variations at the amount of C_{2} within 10,000 km (6,200 mi) from the comet were reported.

== Notes ==
Numbered comets
Previous; 23P/Brorsen–Metcalf	24P/Schaumasse	Next; 25D/Neujmin
