= Theodor Brorsen =

Danish astronomer (1819–1895)

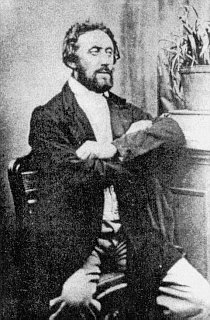
Theodor Brorsen

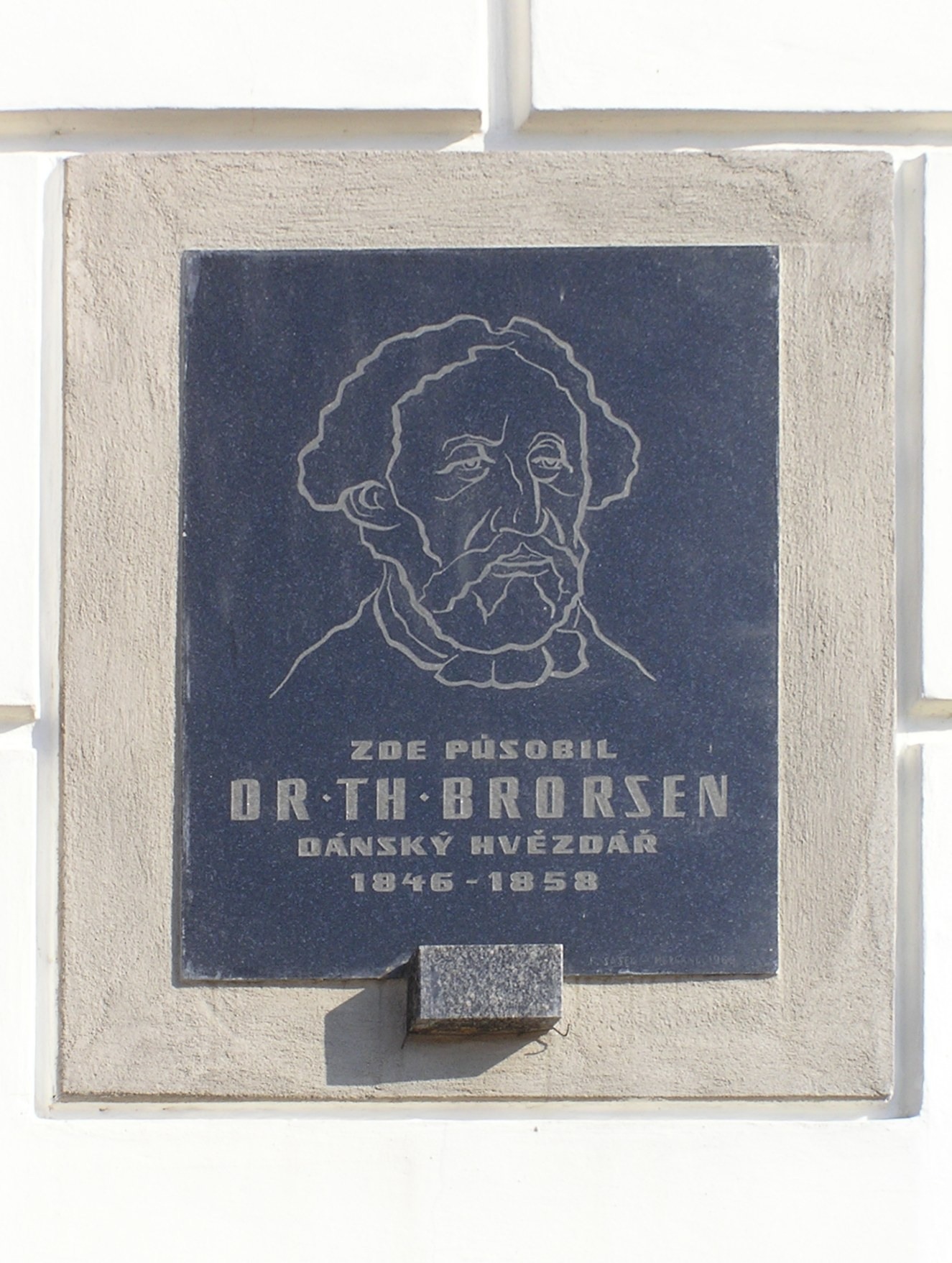
Commemorative plaque of Th. Brorsen on the castle wall in Žamberk

Theodor Johan Christian Ambders Brorsen (29 July 1819 – 31 March 1895) was a Danish astronomer. He is best known for his discovery of five comets, including the lost periodic comet, 5D/Brorsen, and the periodic comet 23P/Brorsen-Metcalf.

== Life ==
Theodor Johan Christian Ambders Brorsen was born in Nordborg on the island Als, (South Jutland), as son of the captain Christian August Brorsen (1793-1840) and Annette Margrethe Gerhardine Schumacher (1788-1855). He got his three middle names after the maternal grandfather of his mother, the Nordborg counsel Johan Christian Ambders (1710-1795). After the amicable divorce of his parents in 1822, Brorsen grew up at his mother's. Her good financial circumstances allowed him to attend the school of the Moravians in Christiansfeld (1826-1829) and then, from 1830 to 1839, the Latin school in Flensburg. By request of his mother, Brorsen studied law in Kiel (1839), Berlin (1840), Heidelberg (1841), and again in Kiel (1842), until he decided to follow his inclinations and studied astronomy in Kiel in 1844.

Brorsen worked at the astronomical observatory of Kiel in 1846, and at the Altona Observatory in 1847. He rejected a job offer from the astronomical observatory "Rundetaarn" (Round tower) in Copenhagen. Instead, he accepted a job at the private observatory of baron John Parish (1774-1858, an Englishman, also known as Freiherr von Senftenberg) in Žamberk (at the time called Senftenberg) in the present-day Czech Republic. When the post of the director of the astronomical observatory of Altona became vacant in 1854, Brorsen applied for it, but was not chosen. After the death of baron Parish in 1858, his heirs had the observatory of Senftenberg dismantled and the astronomical instruments were sold, although Brorsen offered to continue his work for free. Nevertheless. Brorsen remained in Senftenberg for another 12 years, and continued his observations with his own instruments.

In 1870, he returned to his home town of Nordborg in South Jutland, which had become Prussian since the Second War of Schleswig in 1864, and subsequently was German from 1871 up to the plebiscite of 1920. In 1874, Brorsen moved into the house Løjtertoft 11, where he lived until his death. His unmarried half sister, Amalie Petrine Brorsen (1832-1911), kept the house for him. In his years in Nordborg, however, Brorsen hardly occupied himself with astronomy any more. His main interests were meteorology (also observations of the Northern Lights), as well as botany, especially orchid breeding.

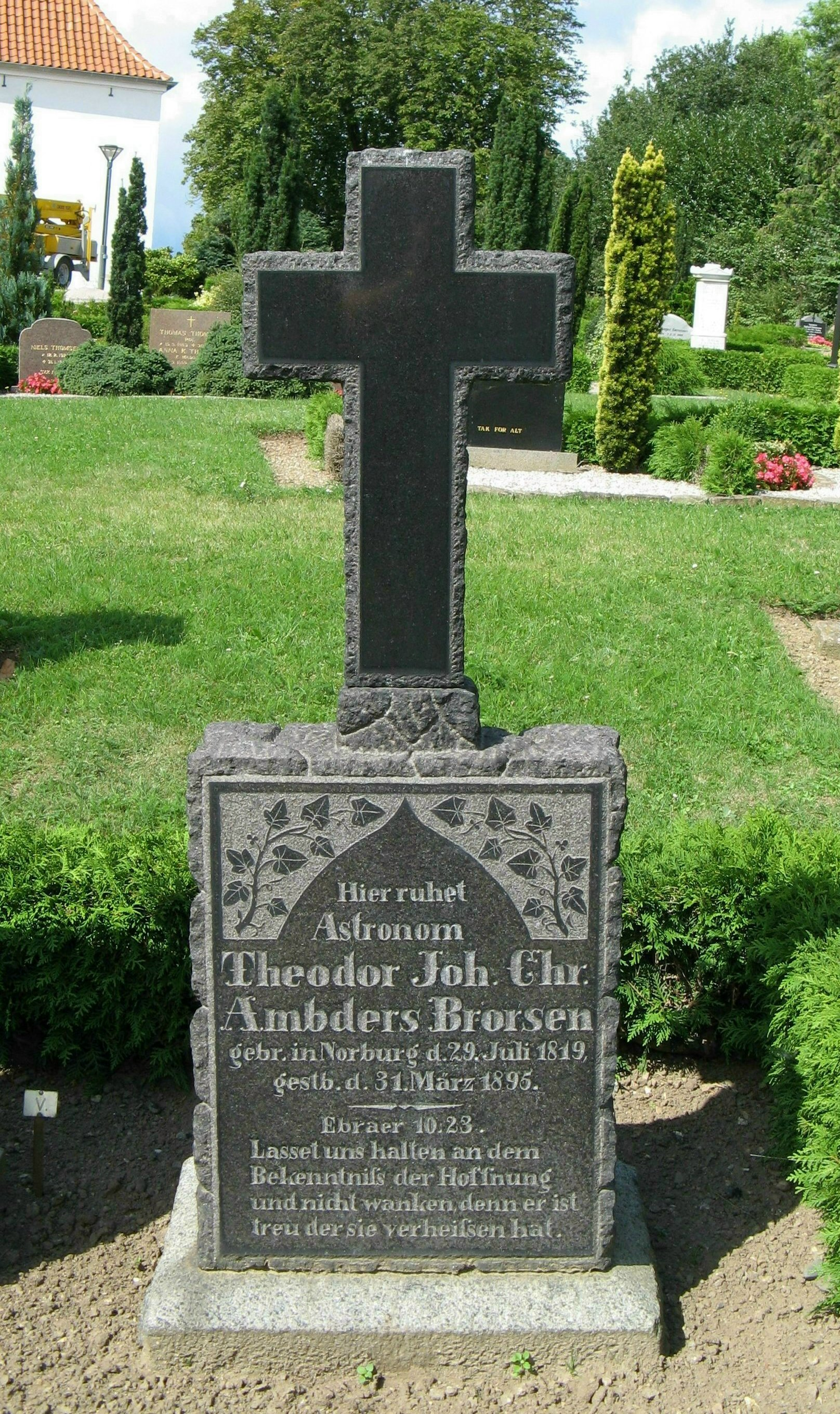
Brorsen's gravestone in the cemetery of Nordborg.

Personally, Brorsen was an introverted character with relationship anxieties. He twice broke off an engagement in the last moment (first one to Louise Lassen from Sønderborg, then another one to Miss Bernkopf from Žamberk) and hence remained unmarried. Besides, there are testimonies that Brorsen developed self-willed habits in the last 25 years of his life spent in Nordborg. He did not take much care for his clothing, he let his hair grow long, and when his boots pressed his feet, he cut holes into his boots in the tight places. He used to take a daily bath in the Oldenor, a lake in Nordborg; in winter, he hoed a hole into the ice for that purpose. Brorsen died at 75 years of age, and was buried on 5 April 1895 in the cemetery of Nordborg where his grave is still preserved today.

== Discoveries ==
- Brorsen discovered five comets: 1846 III, 1846 VII, 1847 V, 1851 III and 1851 IV. Two of them were named after Brorsen as they are periodic comets. The comet 1846 III is called Brorsen and the comet 1847 V is named Brorsen-Metcalf (because Joel Hastings Metcalf was its rediscoverer in 1919).

The comet 5D/Brorsen (with a period of 5.46 years) was last seen in 1879. In all, five of its rotations around the Sun were observed. It belonged to the Jupiter comet family, whose comets can be short-lived- it may not exist today.

The comet 23P/Brorsen-Metcalf (with a period of 69.06 years) was observed in 1847, 1919 and 1989. It belongs to the Halley comet family and is to be expected for 2059 again.

- In 1850, Brorsen (re-)discovered an emission nebula in the constellation Orion: NGC 2024, also known as Flame Nebula. It had already been observed, however, by William Herschel in 1786, as we know today.
- Brorsen might have discovered a sixth comet on 16 March 1854; this discovery could not be confirmed by other astronomers, though.
- In 1854, Brorsen published the first thorough investigations of the so-called gegenschein (counter shine) of the Zodiacal light. He was also able to explain that phenomenon correctly. Besides, Brorsen was the first to discover that the Zodiacal light can embrace the complete sky, because, under favorable conditions, a feeble light bridge connecting the Zodiacal light and the counter glow can be observed.
- In 1856, Brorsen discovered a globular cluster in the constellation Serpens, which was later catalogued as NGC 6539.
- Further, Brorsen investigated the occultations and proper motions of stars. In the field of theoretical astronomy, Brorsen calculated the perihelia of comet and planet orbits.

== Honors ==
- For each of his first three comet discoveries, Brorsen was awarded a golden comet medal by the Danish king Christian VIII. The medal that he got in 1846 can be seen today in the museum at Sønderborg castle, see here.
- Brorsen was appointed a corresponding member of the nature historic society in Žamberk in 1850.
- Today, in Nordborg, a street, Th. Brorsens vej, is named after Brorsen.
- The asteroid 3979, which was discovered by A. Mrkos in Klet on 8 November 1983 was named "Brorsen" on proposal of J. Tichá (MPC 27734 – 1996 August 28).

== Literature ==
- Sven Houmøller, Otto Kryck: Familien Brorsen fra Nordborg. Copenhagen 1949, p. 25-28 (listing the previous literature).
- Hertha Raben Petersen: Theodor Brorsen. Astronom. Nordborg 1986. ISBN 87-88558-05-3
