= 4P/Faye =

Jupiter-family comet

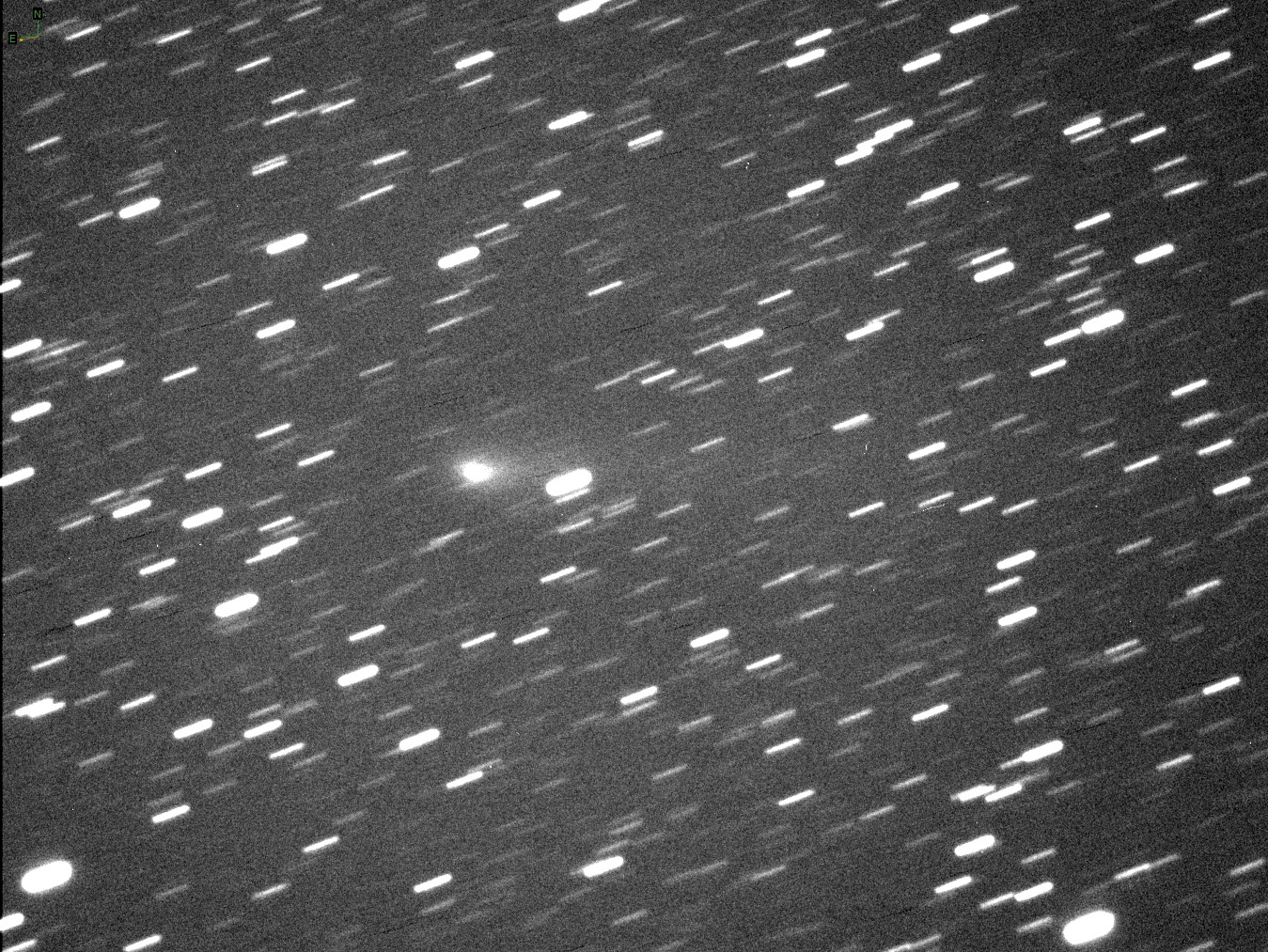
- Faye's Comet as imaged by Luciano Tinelli on 15 November 2021

Discovery
- Discovered by: Hervé Faye
- Discovery site: Royal Observatory, France
- Discovery date: 23 November 1843

Designations
- MPC designation: P/1843 W1, P/1850 W1
- Alternative designations: 1843 III, 1851 I, 1858 V; 1866 II, 1873 III, 1881 I; 1888 IV, 1896 II, 1910 V; 1925 V, 1932 IX, 1940 II; 1947 IX, 1955 II, 1962 VII; 1969 VI, 1977 IV, 1984 XI; 1991 XXI

Orbital characteristics
- Epoch: 25 February 2023 (JD 2460000.5)
- Observation arc: 179.33 years (Note: Observation arc from the Minor Planet Center database only covered dates from 26 August 1865 until 25 March 2023 (157.58 years). This figure includes its entire arc up to 23 November 1843.)
- Number of observations: 7,603
- Aphelion: 6.034 AU
- Perihelion: 1.619 AU
- Semi-major axis: 3.827 AU
- Eccentricity: 0.57683
- Orbital period: 7.48 years
- Inclination: 8.009°
- Longitude of ascending node: 192.92°
- Argument of periapsis: 207.05°
- Mean anomaly: 70.317°
- Last perihelion: 8 September 2021
- Next perihelion: 9 March 2029
- T_{Jupiter}: 2.742
- Earth MOID: 0.589 AU (88.1 million km)
- Jupiter MOID: 0.066 AU (9.9 million km)

Physical characteristics
- Mean radius: 1.77 km (1.10 mi)
- Mean density: 590±70 kg/m^{3}
- Spectral type: (V–R) = 0.45±0.04
- Comet total magnitude (M1): 11.0
- Comet nuclear magnitude (M2): 13.2

Perihelion distance at different epochs
Epoch	Perihelion (AU)
1806	1.74
1843	1.69
1984	1.59
2102	1.51

4P/Faye (also known as Faye's Comet or Comet Faye) is a Jupiter-family comet discovered in November 1843 by Hervé Faye at the Royal Observatory in Paris. On 24 August 2028 the comet will be 1.5 AU from Earth with a solar elongation of 150 degrees at around magnitude 14. The comet comes to perihelion on 9 March 2029.

== Observational history ==
The comet was first observed by Faye on November 23, but bad weather prevented its confirmation until the 25th. It was so faint that it had already passed perihelion about a month before its discovery, and only a close pass by the Earth had made it bright enough for discovery. Otto Wilhelm von Struve reported that the comet was visible to the naked eye at the end of November. It remained visible for smaller telescopes until January 10, 1844, and was finally lost to larger telescopes on April 10, 1844.

In 1844, Friedrich Wilhelm Argelander and Thomas James Henderson independently computed that the comet was a short-period comet; by May, its period had been calculated to be 7.43 years. Urbain Le Verrier computed the positions for the 1851 apparition, predicting perihelion in April 1851. The comet was found close to its predicted position on November 29, 1850, by James Challis.

The comet was missed during its apparitions in 1903 and 1918 due to unfavorable observing circumstances. It reached a brightness of about 9th magnitude in 2006.

== Orbit ==
The comet encounters Jupiter once every 59.3 years, which is gradually reducing its perihelion and increasing its orbital eccentricity. During its 2018 encounter of Jupiter, Faye's perihelion changed from about 1.7 AU to about 1.5 AU. Orbital calculations spanning from 1660 to 2060 revealed that it made nine approaches that are less than 1.5 AU (220 million km) from Jupiter, although no significant perturbations were observed.

Orbit of Comet 4P/Faye

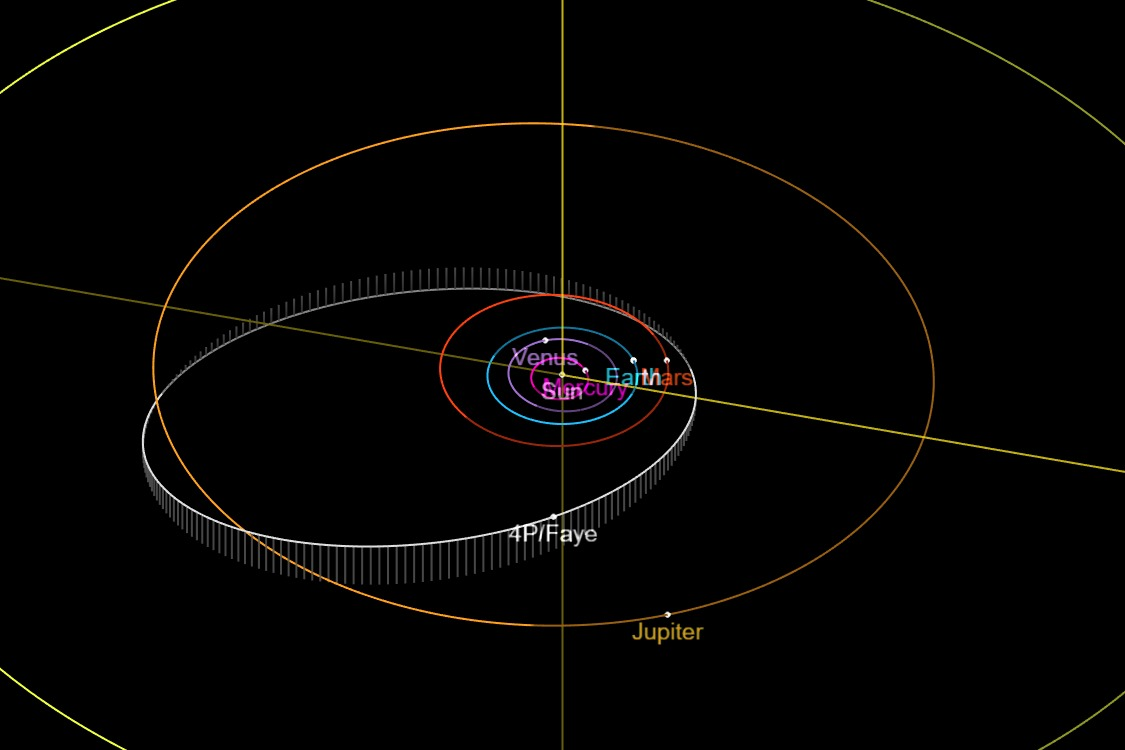

== Physical characteristics ==
Observations from the Hubble Space Telescope between July 1999 and June 2000 revealed that the nucleus of Faye's Comet is estimated to be about 3.54 km (2.20 mi) in diameter.

== Notes ==
Numbered comets
Previous; 3D/Biela	4P/Faye	Next; 5D/Brorsen
