= D/1978 R1 (Haneda–Campos) =

Lost comet

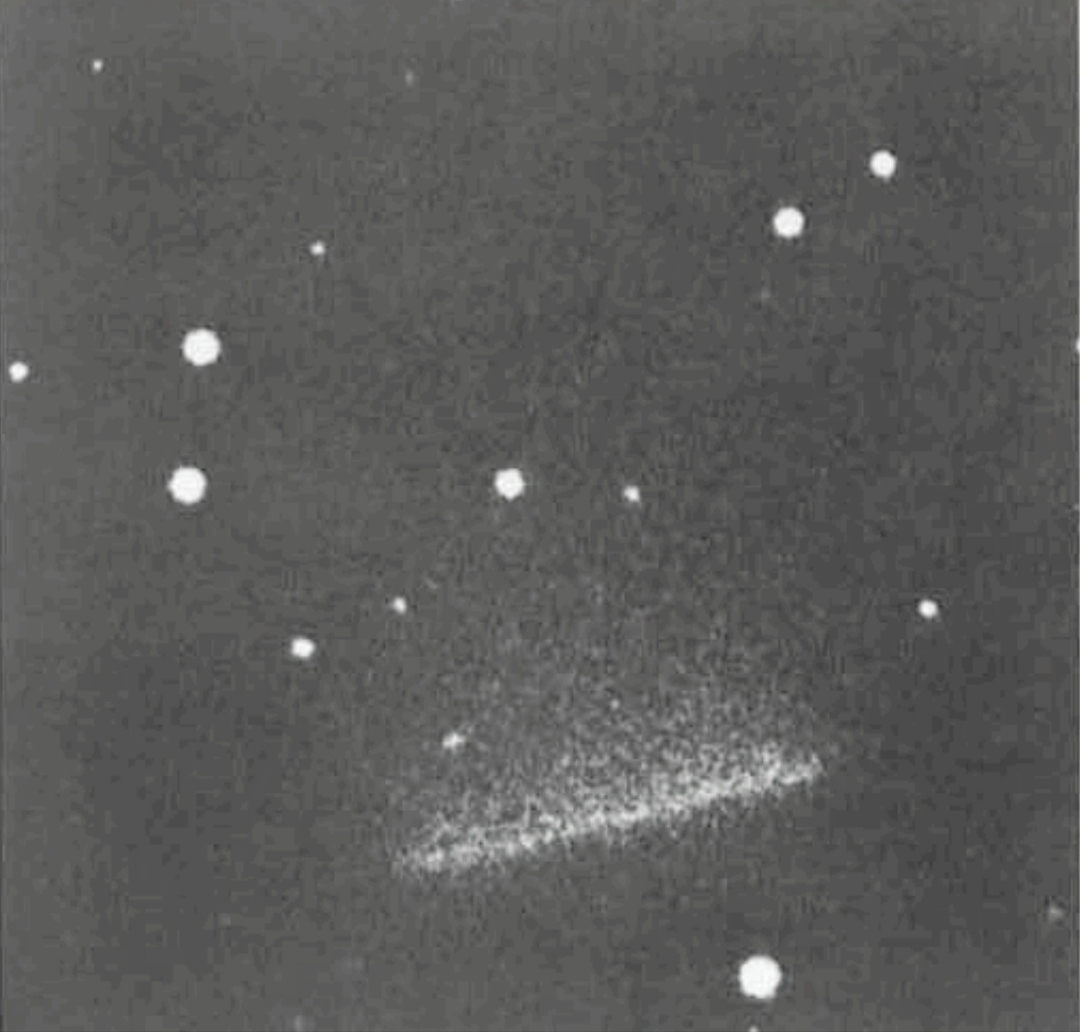
- Comet Haneda–Campos photographed from the European Southern Observatory on 29 September 1978

Discovery
- Discovered by: Toshio Haneda; José S. Campos
- Discovery site: Fukushima, Japan; Durban, South Africa
- Discovery date: 1 September 1978

Designations
- Alternative designations: 1978 XX, 1978j

Orbital characteristics
- Epoch: 28 September 1978 (JD 2443773.5)
- Observation arc: 122 days
- Earliest precovery date: 9 August 1978
- Number of observations: 62
- Aphelion: 5.479 AU
- Perihelion: 1.101 AU
- Semi-major axis: 3.290 AU
- Eccentricity: 0.66524
- Orbital period: 5.968 years
- Avg. orbital speed: 10 km/s
- Inclination: 5.947°
- Longitude of ascending node: 132.25°
- Argument of periapsis: 240.46°
- Last perihelion: 9 October 1978; (observed); 17 April 2023; (calculated)
- Next perihelion: 18 September 2029 (calculated)
- T_{Jupiter}: 2.763
- Earth MOID: 0.135 AU
- Jupiter MOID: 0.331 AU

Physical characteristics
- Mean radius: 0.5 km (0.31 mi)
- Comet total magnitude (M1): 12.8
- Comet nuclear magnitude (M2): 18.0
- Apparent magnitude: 9.0 (1978 apparition)

Comet Haneda–Campos, formally designated as D/1978 R1, was a periodic comet with a 5.97-year elliptical orbit around the Sun. It was never successfully recovered during its 1984 and 1991 apparitions, and is now considered lost.

== Observational history ==
=== Discovery ===
The comet was independently discovered by Toshio Haneda and José da Silva Campos about nine hours apart from each other on the night of 1 September 1978. At the time of discovery, the comet was a diffuse 9th-10th magnitude object within the constellation Microscopium. (Note: Reported initial positions upon discovery were: α = 20^{h} 51^{m} , δ = –29° 27′ (Haneda) and α = 20^{h} 51^{m} , δ = –29° 40′ (Campos).) Their discoveries were later confirmed by John C. Bennett on 5 September 1978.

=== Follow-up observations ===
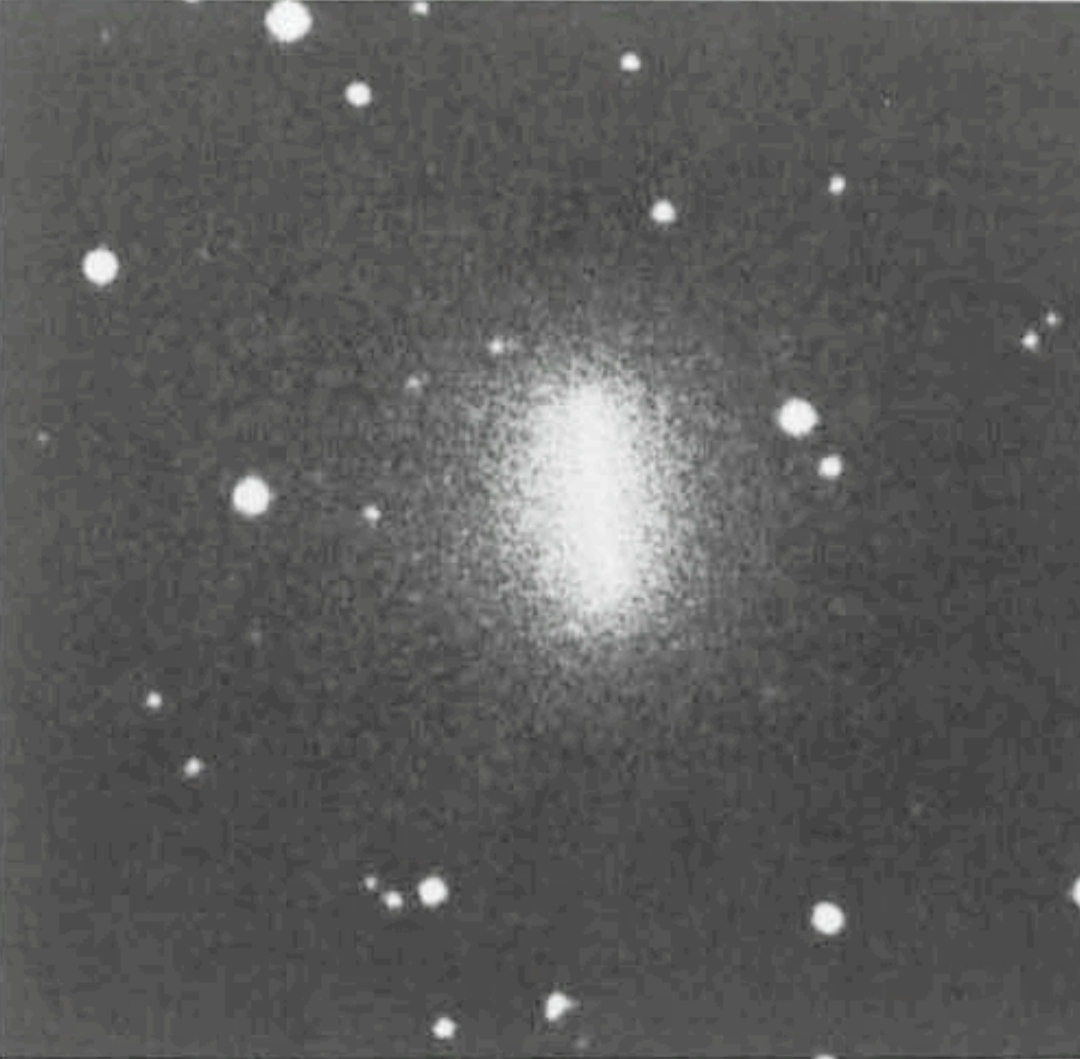
Precovery image of Comet Haneda–Campos from ESO on 9 August 1978

Precovery images of the comet were found to have been taken between 9 and 11 August 1984, from the Perth and Palomar observatories, which enabled Brian G. Marsden to refine the orbital calculations for the comet. Based on Marsden's calculations, the comet made two close encounters with Jupiter in 1957 and 1969, where the comet approached at a distance of 0.3–0.4 AU (45–60 million km) from the giant planet.

The comet made its closest approach with Earth at a distance of 0.154 AU (23.0 million km) on 9 September 1978. It remained as a 10th-magnitude object at the time of its closest Earth encounter, leading astronomers to believe the comet was indeed an intrinsically faint object. It rapidly faded away throughout late September and October, until it was last seen as an 18th-magnitude object on 29 November 1978.

=== Recovery efforts ===
Brian G. Marsden and Shuichi Nakano independently calculated the comet's next perihelia by using 24–55 positions recorded between July and November 1978, and both predicted the comet's return in 1984 and 1991 respectively. However, astronomers failed to recover the comet during both apparitions. It is theorized that the comet was at an outburst during its discovery, and is actually usually fainter than what was observed in 1978.

On 24 December 1984, a faint comet-like object was spotted by Tsutomu Seki, where he initially thought it was the same comet as Haneda–Campos. However, subsequent orbital calculations of this object did not in fact match that of D/1978 R1. (Note: Gary W. Kronk and Maik Meyer stated that during their interview with Seki, this "comet" he saw on the night of 24 December 1984 is most likely an artifact from the photographic plate he took while searching for Comet Haneda–Campos. They tentatively assigned this unidentified comet-like object as "KM1984-2".) As of 2025, the comet remains lost, though the search continues as it approaches its next perihelion in 2029, where it is expected to make another close approach to Earth like it did in 1978.

== Meteor shower ==
The comet is the parent body of a meteor shower called the October Capricornids. First observed in 1971 and 1987, this meteor shower produced about 2–3 meteors per hour at its peak activity. It was again observed from Spain between 1985 and 1988.

A meteoroid originating from Comet Haneda–Campos produced a bright fireball on 3 October 2021, which fell in the night sky over Granada, Spain around 19:41 UTC.

Detailed computer models using MARSIS data had predicted that debris from Haneda–Campos may have caused a meteor shower to occur on Mars in 2007, however no such event was observed.
