= 14627 Emilkowalski =

Main-belt asteroid

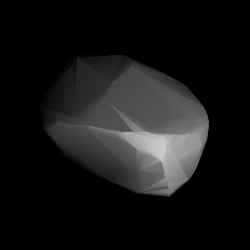
- Emilkowalski modeled from its lightcurve

Discovery
- Discovered by: R. A. Kowalski
- Discovery site: Quail Hollow Obs. (761)
- Discovery date: 7 November 1998

Designations
- Named after: Emil Kowalski (discoverer's family)
- Alternative designations: 1998 VA
- Minor planet category: main-belt · (middle); Emilkowalski

Orbital characteristics
- Epoch 4 September 2017 (JD 2458000.5)
- Uncertainty parameter 0
- Observation arc: 62.93 yr (22,985 days)
- Aphelion: 2.9885 AU
- Perihelion: 2.2112 AU
- Semi-major axis: 2.5998 AU
- Eccentricity: 0.1495
- Orbital period (sidereal): 4.19 yr (1,531 days)
- Mean anomaly: 151.54°
- Mean motion: 0° 14^{m} 6.36^{s} / day
- Inclination: 17.751°
- Longitude of ascending node: 41.443°
- Argument of perihelion: 44.474°

Physical characteristics
- Mean diameter: 6.98±2.55 km 7.105±0.106 km 7.84±2.33 km 10.61 km (calculated)
- Synodic rotation period: 11.131±0.005 h (Note: Pravec (2012) web: 3 rotational light-curves constructed in January, February and March 2012, gave a rotation period 11.131 hours (for all three lightcurves) with a brightness amplitude of 0.55, 0.64 and 0.66 in magnitude, respectively. Summary figures for (14627) Emilkowalski at LCDB and at Ondrejov Asteroid Photometry Project); 11.131 h
- Geometric albedo: 0.057 (assumed); 0.09±0.10; 0.120±0.108; 0.201±0.017
- Spectral type: C · DL · S
- Absolute magnitude (H): 13.1 · 13.38 (R) · 13.6 · 13.7 · 13.85 · 14.19±0.75

14627 Emilkowalski (prov. designation: 1998 VA) is a stony asteroid from the central region of the asteroid belt, approximately 7 kilometers (4.3 miles) in diameter. It was discovered on 7 November 1998, by American astronomer Richard Kowalski at the Quail Hollow Observatory (761) in Zephyrhills, Florida, United States. The asteroid is the namesake of the recently formed Emilkowalski family of asteroids. It was named after Emil Kowalski, mentor of the discoverer.

== Orbit and classification ==
Emilkowalski orbits the Sun in the central main-belt at a distance of 2.2–3.0 AU once every 4 years and 2 months (1,531 days). Its orbit has an eccentricity of 0.15 and an inclination of 18° with respect to the ecliptic.

The first unused observation at Palomar Observatory (DSS) dates back to 1953. The first used precovery was taken at Siding Spring Observatory in 1975, extending the asteroid's observation arc by 23 years prior to its discovery.

=== Emilkowalski family ===
Emilkowalski is the biggest member and namesake of a collisional group of asteroids, that resulted from the destruction of a larger parent body. The disruption happened approximately 220,000 years ago and it is one of the most recent asteroid breakups discovered in the main belt. The recently formed stony Emilkowalski family (family identification number: 523) consist of only 4 identified members. The other members are (126761) 2002 DW_{10}, (224559) 2005 WU_{178} and (256124) 2006 UK_{337}.

== Naming ==
This minor planet is named after American Emil Kowalski (1918–1994) from Syosset, New York, who inspired the discoverer of space science when he was still a child. The approved naming citation was published by the Minor Planet Center on 4 August 2001 (M.P.C. 43192).

== Physical characteristics ==
Emilkowalski has been characterized as a rare DL-type by Pan-STARRS photometric survey. It has also been assigned a taxonomic type of a darker carbonaceous and a common stony asteroid, respectively.

=== Rotation period ===
Between January and March 2012, photometric observations for this asteroid were made by a team led by Petr Pravec at Ondřejov Observatory, Czech Republic. The three obtained rotational lightcurves gave an identical period of 11.131 hours with a brightness variation of 0.55, 0.64 and 0.65 in magnitude, respectively (U=3/2+/3-). Previously, in 2008, a lightcurve was obtained from observations at the Simeiz Observatory and the Chuguev Observing Station (121) in Ukraine, as well as at Maidanak Observatory in Uzbekistan. It also gave a period of 11.131 hours with an amplitude of 0.85 in magnitude, which implies an elongated shape (U=n.a.).

=== Diameter and albedo ===
According to the surveys carried out by NASA's Wide-field Infrared Survey Explorer with its subsequent NEOWISE mission, Emilkowalski measures between 6.98 and 7.84 kilometers in diameter and its surface has an albedo of 0.09 and 0.201.

The Collaborative Asteroid Lightcurve Link assumes a standard albedo for carbonaceous asteroids of 0.057 and hence calculates a larger diameter of 10.6 kilometers.
