= 1114 Lorraine =

Very dark background asteroid

Discovery
- Discovered by: A. Schaumasse
- Discovery site: Nice Obs.
- Discovery date: 17 November 1928

Designations
- Pronunciation: /lɒˈreɪn/
- Named after: Lorraine (French region)
- Alternative designations: 1928 WA · 1971 YK; A906 UE
- Minor planet category: main-belt · (outer) background · Eos

Orbital characteristics
- Epoch 4 September 2017 (JD 2458000.5)
- Uncertainty parameter 0
- Observation arc: 110.62 yr (40,404 days)
- Aphelion: 3.3181 AU
- Perihelion: 2.8732 AU
- Semi-major axis: 3.0956 AU
- Eccentricity: 0.0719
- Orbital period (sidereal): 5.45 yr (1,989 days)
- Mean anomaly: 138.45°
- Mean motion: 0° 10^{m} 51.6^{s} / day
- Inclination: 10.744°
- Longitude of ascending node: 195.52°
- Argument of perihelion: 203.80°

Physical characteristics
- Dimensions: 62.15 km (derived); 62.20±1.7 km 62.35±20.00 km 68.48±0.79 km 70.812±29.31 km 75.631±0.625 km 80.30±26.49 km
- Synodic rotation period: 32±1 h
- Geometric albedo: 0.03±0.02; 0.031±0.006; 0.0331±0.0331; 0.04±0.01; 0.043±0.001; 0.0457 (derived); 0.0501±0.003
- Spectral type: SMASS = X c · X
- Absolute magnitude (H): 9.90 · 10.00 · 10.06 · 10.10 · 10.25±0.23

1114 Lorraine, provisional designation 1928 WA, is a very dark background asteroid from the outer regions of the asteroid belt, approximately 70 kilometers in diameter. It was discovered by Alexandre Schaumasse at Nice Observatory in 1928, and named for the French region of Lorraine.

== Discovery ==
Lorraine was discovered on 17 November 1928, by French astronomer Alexandre Schaumasse at the Nice Observatory in southeastern France. On the following night, it was independently discovered by Italian astronomer Luigi Volta at the Observatory of Turin, Italy. The Minor Planet Center recognizes only the first discoverer. The asteroid was first observed as A906 UE at Heidelberg Observatory in October 1906.

== Orbit and classification ==
Lorraine is a non-family asteroid from the main belt's background population (Nesvorny). Conversely, the asteroid is also considered a core member of the Eos family (Novakovic, Knezevic and Milani). It orbits the Sun in the outer asteroid belt at a distance of 2.9–3.3 AU once every 5 years and 5 months (1,989 days; semi-major axis of 3.10 AU). Its orbit has an eccentricity of 0.07 and an inclination of 11° with respect to the ecliptic. The body's observation arc begins at Nice Observatory in November 1928, one night after its official discovery observation.

== Physical characteristics ==
In the SMASS classification, Lorraine is an Xc-subtype, transiting from the X-type to the C-type asteroids.

=== Rotation period ===
In January 2005, a rotational lightcurve of Lorraine was obtained from photometric observations by French amateur astronomer Laurent Bernasconi. Analysis of the fragmentary lightcurve gave a longer-than-average rotation period of 32 hours with a brightness amplitude of 0.16 magnitude (U=1). As of 2018, no secure period has been obtained.

=== Diameter and albedo ===
According to the surveys carried out by the Infrared Astronomical Satellite IRAS, the Japanese Akari satellite and the NEOWISE mission of NASA's Wide-field Infrared Survey Explorer, Lorraine measures between 62.20 and 80.30 kilometers in diameter and its surface has an albedo between 0.03 and 0.0501.

The Collaborative Asteroid Lightcurve Link derives an albedo of 0.0457 and a diameter of 62.15 kilometers based on an absolute magnitude of 10.0.

== Naming ==
This minor planet was named after the region of Lorraine, the former Duchy of Lorraine in north-eastern France, and a remnant of the medieval kingdom of Lotharingia (AN 238;149).
