= C/1846 J1 (Brorsen) =

Non-periodic comet

Discovery
- Discovered by: Theodor Brorsen
- Discovery date: 1 May 1846

Designations
- Alternative designations: 1846 VII

Orbital characteristics
- Epoch: 7 June 1846 (JD 2395453.471)
- Observation arc: 41 days
- Number of observations: 170
- Aphelion: 131.6 AU
- Perihelion: 0.634 AU
- Semi-major axis: 66.1 AU
- Eccentricity: 0.9904
- Orbital period: 538 years
- Inclination: 150.68°
- Longitude of ascending node: 263.99°
- Argument of periapsis: 99.73°
- Last perihelion: 5 June 1846
- T_{Jupiter}: -0.780
- Earth MOID: 0.049 AU

Physical characteristics
- Comet total magnitude (M1): 8.1
- Apparent magnitude: 6 (1846 apparition)

C/1846 J1 (Brorsen) is a long period comet discovered by Theodor Brorsen on 1 May 1846. It is the parent body of the weak meteor shower December sigma Virginids.

== Observational history ==
The comet was discovered on May 1, 1846, by Theodor Brorsen. He described it as a large round nebulosity without tail. An independent discovery was done later the same day by Moritz Ludwig George Wichmann. The comet upon discovery was near the border of the constellations Pegasus and Vulpecula. The comet approached Earth at a distance of 0.302 astronomical units (45,200,000 km; 28,100,000 mi) on May 6.

The comet was observed with naked eye on 13 May, after the Moon had set, and continued to be visible until 20 May. A faint tail was observed. Due to slow communications, George Phillips Bond discovered the comet on May 20 unaware of the previous discoveries. In June the comet became progressively harder to observe as the solar elongation became smaller. It was last observed on June 15, located low near the horizon.

== Meteor showers ==
The orbit of the comet has a striking similarity with the orbit of the weak December sigma Virginids (#428) meteor shower, which peaks on 20–22 December, but seems to be active from December 1 to January 10. The shower seems to be the same as the epsilon Virginids (#513). The peak zenithal hourly rate is about 1.5 for visual meteors.
