= Alexandre Schaumasse =

French astronomer

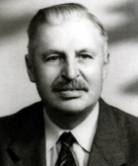
Alexandre Schaumasse in 1920

Alexandre Schaumasse (1882–1958) was a French astronomer and discoverer of comets and minor planets.

His discoveries include the periodic comet 24P/Schaumasse, and the two non-periodic comets C/1913 J1 (Schaumasse) or 1913 II, and C/1917 H1 (Schaumasse) or 1917 II. He also discovered two asteroids, 971 Alsatia and 1114 Lorraine, in 1921 and 1928, respectively.

Gaston Fayet, director of the Observatory in Nice, gave him the responsibility of the Chercheur de comètes (Comet finder), a 25 cm (F/D 7.2) refractor offered by Germany to France after the first World War. However, it appears he never made any serious observations with this instrument due to its "abundance of aberrations", according to fellow astronomer Robert Jonckhèere. The two instruments he used most were the Grand Equatorial Coudé (with which he recorded most of his observations), and the Petit Equatorial (current dome Charlois).

He was severely wounded in 1914 while serving in the French army during World War I, and spent at least a year in hospital.

He was awarded the Valz Prize (Prix Valz) for 1917 by the French Academy of Sciences. In 1943, he was awarded the Lalande Prize.

The building that houses Chercheur de comètes, built in 1931, now bears his name (Schaumasse dome). The inner main-belt asteroid 1797 Schaumasse was named in his honor (M.P.C. 4358).

Asteroids discovered: 2
971 Alsatia	November 23, 1921	MPC
1114 Lorraine	November 17, 1928	MPC
