= 226P/Pigott–LINEAR–Kowalski =

Periodic comet

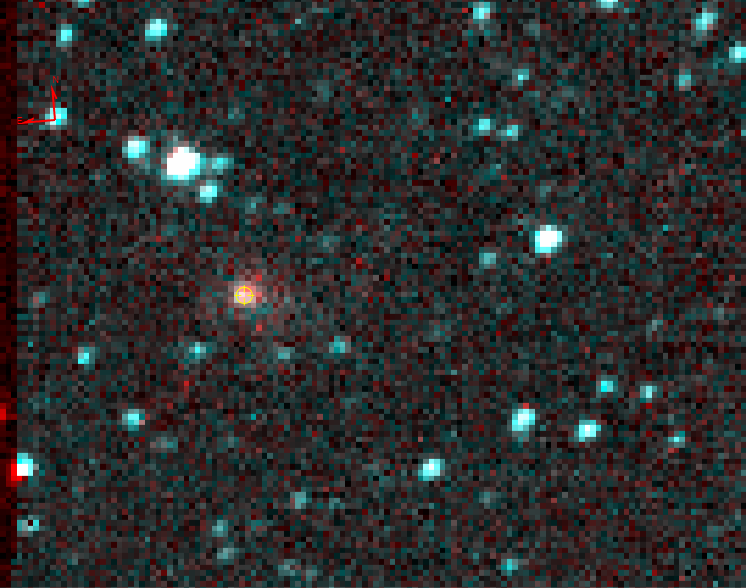
- Comet Pigott–LINEAR–Kowalski photographed by NEOWISE on 8 September 2016

Discovery
- Discovered by: Edward Pigott; LINEAR; Richard Kowalski
- Discovery date: 19 November 1783; 5 January 2003; 11 September 2009

Designations
- MPC designation: D/1783 W1, P/2003 A1; P/2009 R2
- Alternative designations: 1783 I

Orbital characteristics
- Epoch: 21 November 2025 (JD 2461000.5)
- Observation arc: 240.40 years (Note: Observation arc from the Minor Planet Center database only covered dates from 29 October 1995 until 12 April 2024 (28.45 years). This figure includes its entire arc up to 19 November 1783.)
- Number of observations: 1,888
- Aphelion: 5.756 AU
- Perihelion: 1.775 AU
- Semi-major axis: 3.766 AU
- Eccentricity: 0.52871
- Orbital period: 7.307 years
- Inclination: 44.043°
- Longitude of ascending node: 54.017°
- Argument of periapsis: 341.04°
- Mean anomaly: 93.749°
- Last perihelion: 26 December 2023
- Next perihelion: 16 April 2031
- T_{Jupiter}: 2.420
- Earth MOID: 0.811 AU
- Jupiter MOID: 0.072 AU

Physical characteristics
- Mean radius: 1.075 km (0.668 mi)
- Comet total magnitude (M1): 10.1
- Comet nuclear magnitude (M2): 15.6

226P/Pigott–LINEAR–Kowalski is a Jupiter-family comet with an orbital period of 7.3 years. It was discovered by Edward Pigott on 19 November 1783, but was subsequently lost, until it was recovered by the Lincoln Near-Earth Asteroid Research (LINEAR) and Richard Kowalski, respectively. It last came to perihelion on 27 December 2023 at about apparent magnitude 15.

== Observational history ==
=== Discovery and loss ===
The comet was discovered by English astronomer Edward Pigott from York, England, on 19 November 1783. The comet was located in the constellation of Cetus, (Note: Reported initial position upon discovery was: α = 2^{h} 44^{m} , δ = 3° 10′) and he described it as a nebula with faint nucleus not visible in a good opera glass. He continued to follow the comet and noted that by 26 November it had dimmed. The comet was observed by Pierre Méchain on 26 November and Charles Messier the next day. Charles Messier mentioned that the comet was not visible to the naked eye, and described the comet as seen though a refractor as extremely faint nebulosity about 4 arcmin across with strong central condensation. The comet continued to dim and was last observed on 21 December 1783. The initial orbits calculated assumed a parabolic orbit, but it didn't fit well enough the observed positions. An elliptical orbit was calculated by Christian Heinrich Friedrich Peters in 1860 indicated an orbital period of 5.89 years.

=== Recovery and follow-up observations ===
The comet was recovered on 5 January 2003 by LINEAR. It was thought originally that it was an asteroid but further observations showed it was diffuse, having a coma 8 arcseconds across. Its apparent magnitude was estimated to be 18.4 at discovery. It was named C/2003 A1. During the next apparition the comet was recovered by Richard Kowalski of Catalina Sky Survey on 10 September 2009, with an apparent magnitude of around 18. The comet was then identified as the same comet as P/1783 W1 and 2003 A1, shortly after additional orbital calculations were made. It was subsequently given an official numerical designation (226P) on October 2009.

During the 2016 apparition it brightened up to an apparent magnitude of 13.9.

== Physical characteristics ==
Infrared observations from the Wide-field Infrared Survey Explorer (WISE) spacecraft indicated that the nucleus of 226P/Pigott–LINEAR–Kowalski is around 2.15 km (1.34 mi) in diameter.

== Notes ==
Numbered comets
Previous; 225P/LINEAR	226P/Pigott–LINEAR–Kowalski	Next; 227P/Catalina-LINEAR
