= Richard Kowalski =

American astronomer (born 1963)

- Born: 1963 (age 62–63)
- Occupation: Astronomer

Richard A. Kowalski (born 1963) is an American astronomer who has discovered numerous asteroids and comets, among them, many near-Earth objects.

Kowalski has had a lifelong interest in astronomy with an emphasis on planetary science. As an amateur in Florida during the 1990s he developed an interest in astrometric and photometric observations of asteroids. He started the "Minor Planet Mailing List" in mid-1997. Kowalski discovered 14627 Emilkowalski in 1998.

In 1999 he was invited to use the Jet Propulsion Laboratory's 0.6-m Ritchey-Chrétien telescope to make observations in support of the Deep Space 1 mission. Also in 1999 he was the Scientific Coordinator for the first Minor Planet Amateur-Professional Workshop at Lowell Observatory in Flagstaff, Arizona.

He has been a member of the Catalina Sky Survey (CSS) in Tucson, Arizona since September 2005 and has discovered hundreds of near-Earth and main-belt asteroids along with thirteen comets. Of these, periodic comet 226P/Pigott-LINEAR-Kowalski was the recovery of Edward Pigott's lost comet of 1783. Kowalski discovered the comet C/2013 US10 on Halloween morning, 2013.

On October 6, 2008, while observing with the CSS 1.5 meters (59 in) telescope at Mount Lemmon Observatory, he discovered 2008 TC3. Approximately 20 hours after its discovery this asteroid entered the Earth's atmosphere over Sudan, becoming the first asteroid discovered before impact with the earth. Kowalski was honored with a small piece of 2008 TC_{3}.

On January 1, 2014, Kowalski found another impacting asteroid, this was designated 2014 AA. The impact zone for this asteroid was in the middle of the Atlantic Ocean.

The main-belt asteroid 7392 Kowalski is named in his honor.

Kowalski is a FAA certified commercial pilot holding Instrument and flight instructor ratings. He also runs a free-lance photography studio in Tucson, Arizona.
