= 5D/Brorsen =

Lost comet

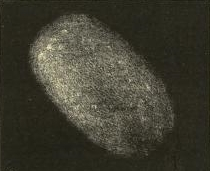
- Coma of 5D/Brorsen, as it appeared on 14 May 1868, drawn by K. Christian Bruhns

Discovery
- Discovered by: Theodor Brorsen
- Discovery site: Holstein, Germany
- Discovery date: 26 February 1846

Designations
- MPC designation: P/1846 D2; P/1857 F1
- Alternative designations: 1846 III, 1857 II; 1868 I, 1873 VI; 1879 I

Orbital characteristics
- Epoch: 1 April 1879 (JD 2407440.5)
- Observation arc: Not observed in 147 years
- Number of observations: 57
- Aphelion: 5.612 AU
- Perihelion: 0.5898 AU
- Semi-major axis: 3.101 AU
- Eccentricity: 0.8098
- Orbital period: 5.461 years
- Inclination: 29.382°
- Last perihelion: 31 March 1879 (last observation)
- Next perihelion: 15 October 2028? (Horizons); 28 November 2028? (Kinoshita)
- T_{Jupiter}: 2.467
- Earth MOID: 0.367 AU
- Comet total magnitude (M1): 8.3

5D/Brorsen (also known as Brorsen's Comet or Comet Brorsen) was a periodic Jupiter-family comet discovered on February 26, 1846, by Danish astronomer Theodor Brorsen. The comet was last seen in 1879 and is now lost, having not been observed in 147 years.

== Observational history ==
The comet was discovered on February 26, 1846, by Danish astronomer Theodor Brorsen. The perihelion of 5D/Brorsen was February 25, just a day before its discovery, and it passed closest to Earth on March 27, at a distance of 0.52 AU (78 million km). As a result of this close encounter to Earth, the comet's coma diameter increased. Johann Friedrich Julius Schmidt estimated it as 3 to 4 arcminutes across on March 9, and 8 to 10 arcminutes across on the 22nd of that same month. On April 22, it was about 20 degrees from the north celestial pole. By the end of this first apparition the orbital period was calculated as 5.5 years. J. Russell Hind later calculated that this comet had a close approach to Jupiter on 20 May 1842, placing it to the initial orbit from which it was discovered.

The comet's 5.5-year period would mean that apparitions would alternate between good and poor. As expected, the comet was missed in its 1851 apparition, when it only came as close as 1.5 AU to Earth. The comet's orbit was still relatively uncertain, made worse by its approach to Jupiter in 1854. Karl Christian Bruhns found a comet on 18 March 1857. Soon an orbit was computed and it was found to be 5D/Brorsen, although predictions were three months off. The comet was followed until June 1857, and the orbit was then well established. Observers reported that the comet had a bright, almost star-like nucleus.

The comet was missed in 1862, and the next recovery was in 1868. A close approach to Jupiter shortened the period enough to make the comet visible in 1873. A very favorable apparition followed in 1879, allowing the comet to be observed for the longest time to date – four months. The comet was missed in 1884, due to observing circumstances, but was also missed in 1890, a favorable apparition. The next favorable apparition occurred in 1901, but searches did not locate the comet.

The next serious search was started by Brian G. Marsden in 1963, who believed the comet had faded out of existence, but computed the orbit for a very favorable 1973 apparition. Takuo Kojima made intensive searches for the comet in January 1973, but nothing turned up, which finally led Marsden to conclude that the comet was lost.

Zdenek Sekanina suggested that the comet underwent a change in the rotation axis of the nucleus in mid 19th century, resulting to non-gravitational changes in the orbit, while also mentioned that there are some evidence that the comet may have disintegrated. These evidence are the accounts of the large expansion of the coma after perihelion at the 1868 and 1879 apparitions, the presence of condensations in the inner coma during the 1857 and 1868 apparitions and the account by Johann Friedrich Julius Schmidt that on 20 May 1879 the comet was very faint and lacked a nucleus.

== Possible identification as 1996 SK ==
Perihelion distance at different epochs
Epoch	Perihelion (AU)
1879	0.59
1923	0.66
1928	0.58
2034	0.50
2056	0.48

In 2001, Lubos Neslusan tentatively identified the asteroid (297274) 1996 SK (≈1-km in diameter) as the possible extinct nucleus of 5D/Brorsen based on the similarity of their respective orbits. 1996 SK will next come to opposition on 20 August 2026 at apparent magnitude 21. 1996 SK will then come to perihelion on 31 May 2027 when it will have a solar elongation of only 17 degrees. On 9 May 2031, asteroid 1996 SK will pass 0.207 AU (31.0 million km; 19.2 million mi) from Earth with a solar elongation of 78 degrees and at apparent magnitude 16.7.

Numbered comets
Previous; 4P/Faye	5D/Brorsen	Next; 6P/d'Arrest
