= Palmaille =

Avenue in Altona, Hamburg, Germany

Coordinates: 53.5461°N 9.9389°E

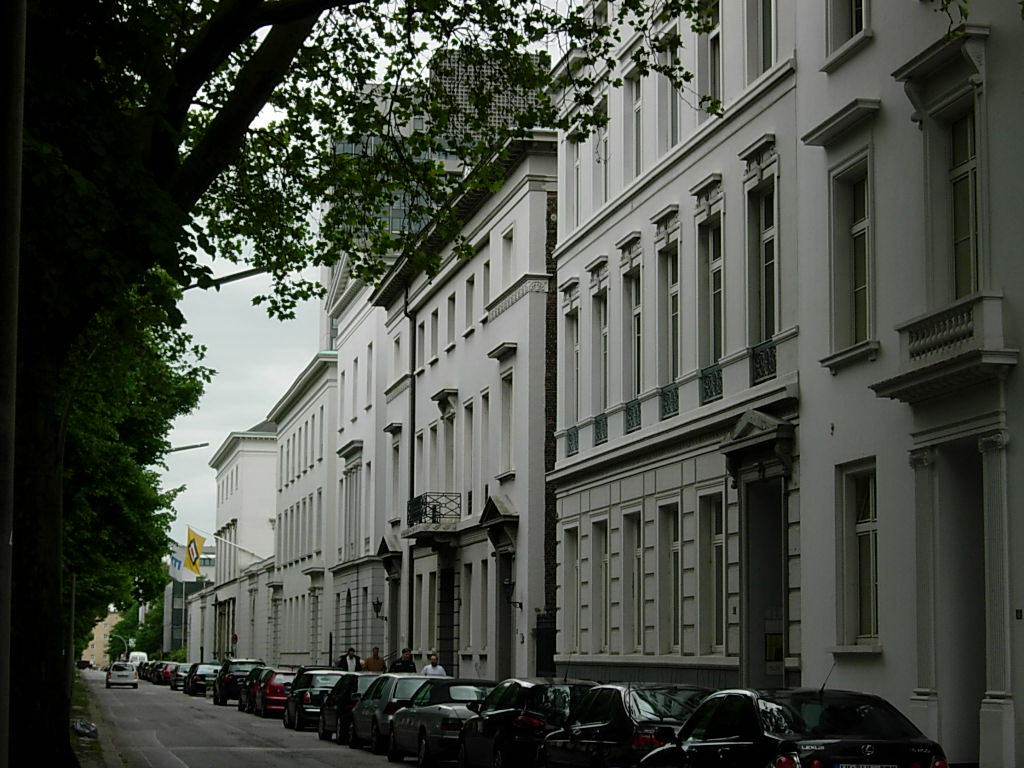
Buildings along Palmaille's southern side. The two opposite sides are separated by a median lawn and two rows of linden.

The Palmaille (French pronunciation: [palˈmɑj]) is a famous boulevard in Altona, Hamburg. It is considered one of northern Europe's most complete examples of a Neoclassical urban ensemble.

First developed in the 1630s as a lane for the then popular palle-maille, in the course of the 18th century the Palmaille became Altona's most sought-after address. At the time, the town of Altona was part of the Duchy of Holstein being in personal union with the Kingdom of Denmark, and Danish monarchs promoted it as a fierce economic rival to Hamburg. The wealthy merchant families of Altona had their stately palaces built by Christian Frederik Hansen (1756–1845), then Director of the Royal Danish Academy of Arts and Royal Danish master-builder for the Duchy of Holstein; later also by his nephew Johann Matthias Hansen (1786–1825). Some of the buildings were hit during World War II, but could be rebuilt according to Hansen's original drawings.
