= Weinek (crater) =

Crater on the Moon

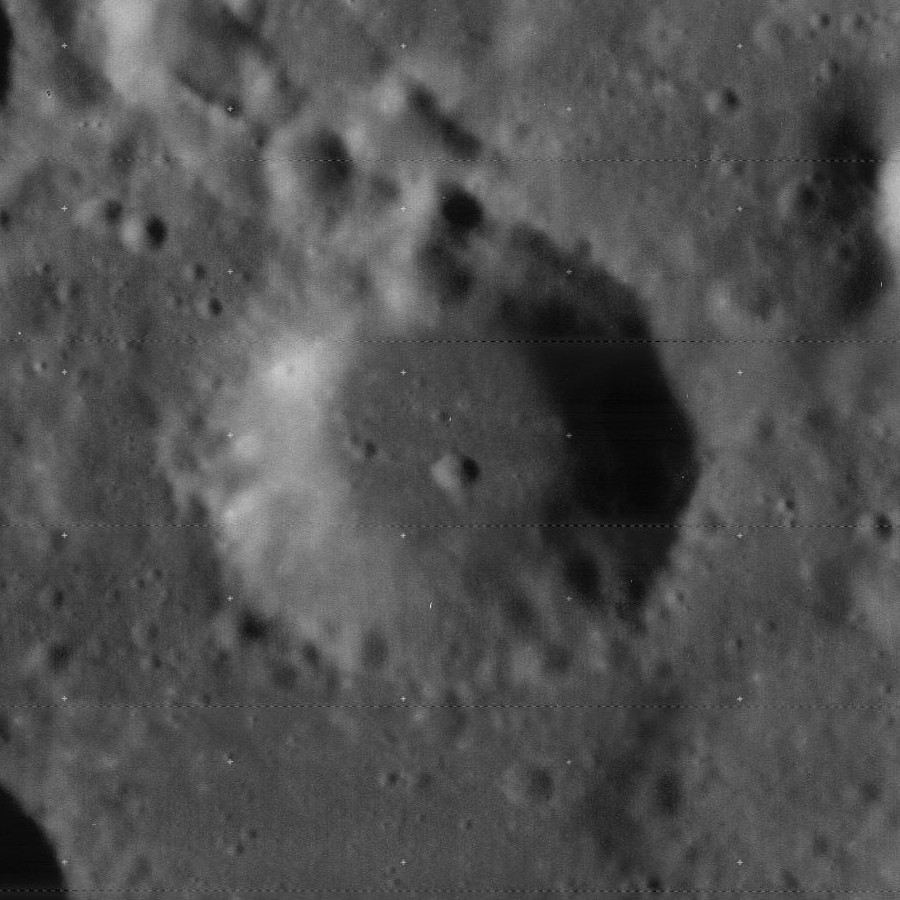
- Lunar Orbiter 4 image
- Coordinates: 27.5°S 37.0°E
- Diameter: 32 km
- Depth: 3.4 km
- Colongitude: 323° at sunrise
- Eponym: Ladislaus Weinek

Weinek is a small lunar impact crater that is located in the southeastern part of the Moon, to the south of the Mare Nectaris. It was named after Austro-Hungarian astronomer Ladislaus Weinek. It lies about one crater diameter to the east-northeast of the prominent Piccolomini. To the southeast is Neander.

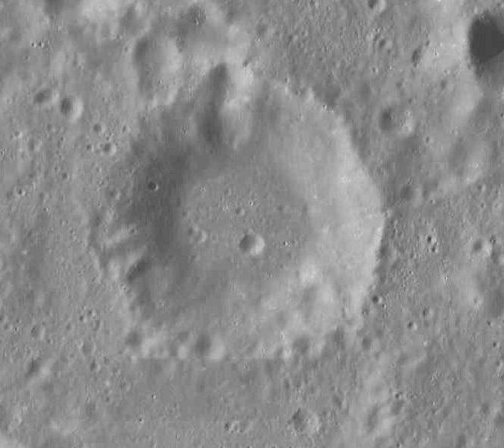
LRO image (photographed in December 2011)

The outer rim of this formation has undergone some wear, but the general circular form is still distinct. A triple cluster of small craters lies across the northern rim and inner wall, and there are small craterlets along the southern rim. The inner walls are generally even and slope directly down to the interior floor, with the exception of some irregularity to the south-southeast. The interior floor is marked only by a small craterlet to the southeast of the midpoint.

== Satellite craters ==
By convention these features are identified on lunar maps by placing the letter on the side of the crater midpoint that is closest to Weinek.

Weinek	Latitude	Longitude	Diameter
A	26.9° S	35.5° E	10 km
B	26.9° S	38.2° E	11 km
D	26.0° S	36.6° E	9 km
E	25.3° S	37.5° E	9 km
F	25.1° S	38.2° E	4 km
G	26.9° S	39.0° E	15 km
H	28.6° S	38.5° E	6 km
K	28.9° S	38.4° E	17 km
L	26.1° S	39.7° E	9 km
M	25.8° S	40.0° E	6 km
