= Ladislaus Weinek =

Austro-Hungarian astronomer (1848–1913)

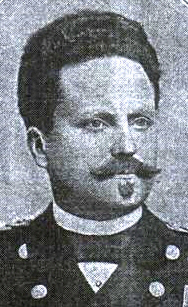
Ladislaus Weinek

Ladislaus Weinek (Hungarian: Weinek László, 13 February 1848, Buda – 12 November 1913, Prague) was an Austro-Hungarian astronomer.

He was educated in Vienna, and worked for a period at the photography laboratories in Schwerin. In 1874 he joined a German expedition aboard the steam frigate SMS Gazelle to the Kerguelen Islands to observe a transit of Venus across the face of the Sun. His results from the expedition were published in Nova Acta Leopoldina.

In 1883 he became a professor in Prague and was the ninth director of the Klementinum observatory. There, on 27 November 1885, he took the first known photograph of a meteor. He set up observing stations in Prague and Dresden (to observe the Andromedids shower of that year, which turned out to be very intense), and caught a 7mm-long trail on a plate in Prague.

In collaboration with Karl Friedrich Küstner (in Berlin), he made measurements of the altitude of the celestial pole. During their investigations they also discovered polar motion, the movement of the Earth's polar axis relative to the crust.

Using images taken at the Lick Observatory and the Meudon Observatory, he produced the first atlas of the Moon that was based on photographs. The crater Weinek on the Moon and the asteroid 7114 Weinek are named after him.
