= 23P/Brorsen–Metcalf =

Halley-type comet

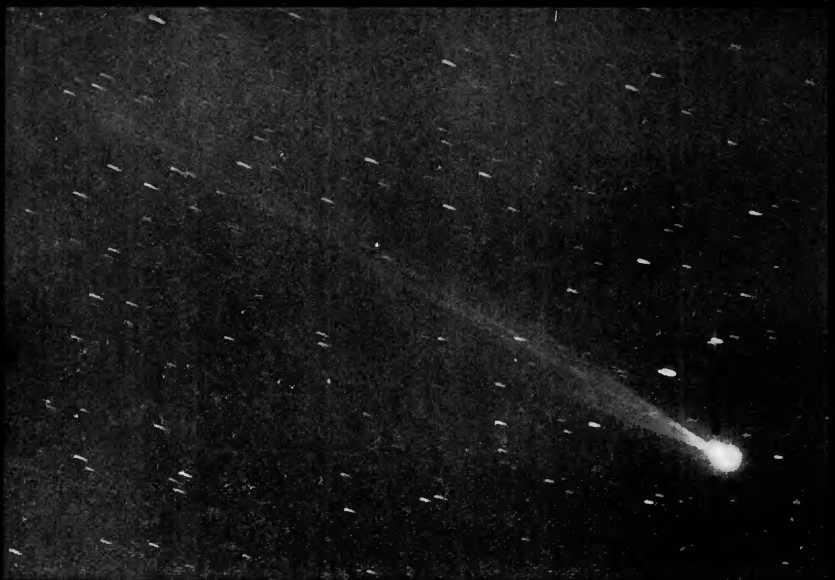
- Comet Brorsen–Metcalf photographed by Edward E. Barnard on 6 October 1919

Discovery
- Discovered by: Theodor Brorsen; Joel Metcalf
- Discovery site: Altona Observatory
- Discovery date: 20 July 1847

Designations
- MPC designation: P/1847 O1, P/1919 Q1; P/1989 N1
- Alternative designations: 1847 V, 1919 III, 1989 X; 1919b, 1989o

Orbital characteristics
- Epoch: 1 October 1989 (JD 2447800.5)
- Observation arc: 142.11 years
- Number of observations: 250
- Aphelion: 33.65 AU
- Perihelion: 0.478 AU
- Semi-major axis: 17.07 AU
- Eccentricity: 0.972
- Orbital period: 70.546 years
- Max. orbital speed: 60.2 km/s
- Inclination: 19.336°
- Longitude of ascending node: 311.59°
- Argument of periapsis: 129.61°
- Mean anomaly: 0.266°
- Last perihelion: 11 September 1989
- Next perihelion: 8 June 2059
- T_{Jupiter}: 1.109
- Earth MOID: 0.194 AU

Physical characteristics
- Mean radius: <5.0 km (3.1 mi)
- Comet total magnitude (M1): 7.8
- Comet nuclear magnitude (M2): 14.0

23P/Brorsen–Metcalf is a periodic comet with an orbital period of 70 years. It fits the classical definition of a Halley-type comet.

== Observational history ==
=== Discovery ===
It was first discovered by Theodor Brorsen at the Altona Observatory on 20 July 1847, and again by Kaspar Schweizer (Moscow) on 11 August 1847. It was predicted that it would reappear between 1919 and 1922.

=== 1919 apparition ===
On 21 August 1919, the comet was recovered by Joel Hastings Metcalf (Camp Idlewild, Vermont, United States) as 8th magnitude. Additional discoveries were made by Edward Barnard (Yerkes Observatory, Wisconsin, United States) on 22 August, Michel Giacobini (Paris, France), Ostrovlev (Theodosia, Crimea) and Selavanov (Saint Petersburg). By the end of September 1919 it was confirmed as being the same as Brorsen's comet.

The comet became visible with naked eye as a small hazy spot of light and on 6 October 1919 it was estimated to have a magnitude of 4.5. The comet had a slender tail with a length of 8,5 degrees. On the photographs of the comet on 22 October 1919 a disconnection event of the tail was visible, that probably started on 20 October.

=== 1989 apparition ===
The comet was recovered by the Palomar Observatory on 4 July 1989, when it had an estimated magnitude of 15, while Alan Hale estimated visually that it had a magnitude of 11.5 on 7 July. The comet brightened rapidly during July and by the end of the month it was reported to have an apparent magnitude of 7–7.5, while developing a short tail. The comet reached its perigee on 6 August, at a distance of 0.62 AU (93 million km), while its perihelion was on 11 September. Between the two dates the comet had a magnitude between 5 and 6 and was reported to be visible by naked eye. In September the tail grew longer and was reported visually to have a length of about 7 degrees. The comet faded in the second half of September and the diminishing solar elongation hindered further observations. During the 1989 apparition, the comet became the first comet to be definitely detected in submillimeter wavelengths. Spectroscopic and infrared photometric observations conducted between 28 August and 6 September 1989 from the NASA Infrared Telescope Facility of the Mauna Kea Observatory in Hawaii obtained an upper limit of the radius of its nucleus at no greater than 5.0 km (3.1 mi).

Numbered comets
Previous; 22P/Kopff	23P/Brorsen–Metcalf	Next; 24P/Schaumasse
