= Biela's Comet =

Lost comet

3D/Biela
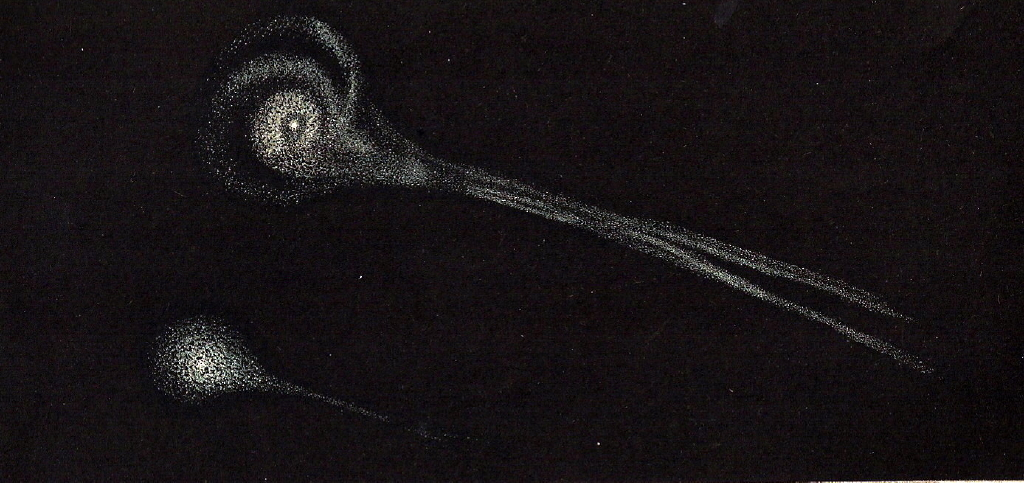
- A sketch of Biela's Comet in February 1846, soon after it split into two pieces

Discovery
- Discovered by: Wilhelm von Biela (recognition of periodicity)
- Discovery date: 27 February 1826

Designations
- MPC designation: D/1772 E1, D/1826 D1; D/1832 S1
- Alternative designations: 1772, 1806 I, 1832 III; 1846 II, 1852 III

Orbital characteristics
- Epoch: 29 September 1852 (JD 2397760.5)
- Observation arc: ~80 years
- Earliest precovery date: 8 March 1772
- Number of observations: 26
- Aphelion: 6.190 AU
- Perihelion: 0.879 AU
- Semi-major axis: 3.535 AU
- Eccentricity: 0.87907
- Orbital period: 6.619 years
- Inclination: 13.216°
- Longitude of ascending node: 250.67°
- Argument of periapsis: 221.66°
- Mean anomaly: 0.947°
- Last perihelion: 23 September 1852 (A); 24 September 1852 (B)
- Next perihelion: Disintegrated
- T_{Jupiter}: 2.531
- Earth MOID: 0.0005 AU

Physical characteristics
- Mean diameter: ≈0.5 km (0.31 mi) (pre-breakup)

Biela's Comet or Comet Biela (official designation: 3D/Biela) was a Jupiter-family comet first recorded in 1772 by Jacques Leibax Montaigne and Charles Messier, and finally identified as periodic in 1826 by Wilhelm von Biela. It was subsequently observed to split in two, and has not been seen since 1852. As a result, it is currently thought to have been destroyed. Remnants have survived as a meteor shower, the Andromedids.

The comet was first recorded on 8 March 1772 by Montaigne, and during the same apparition was independently discovered by Messier. It was also recorded in 1805 by Jean-Louis Pons, but was not recognized as the same object at the time.

== Observational history ==
=== Discovery ===
Around 9 December 1805, Comet Biela passed about 0.0366 AU (5.48 million km) from Earth. After the 1805 apparition, a number of attempts were made by Gauss (1806) and Bessel (1806) to calculate a definitive orbit. Gauss and Olbers both noted a similarity between the 1805 and 1772 comets, but they were not able to prove a link.

3D/Biela closest Earth approach on 9 December 1805
Date and time of closest approach	Earth distance (AU)	Sun distance (AU)	Velocity relative to Earth (km/s)	Velocity relative to Sun (km/s)	Solar elongation
9 December 1805 ≈21:48	0.0366 AU (5.48 million km; 3.40 million mi; 14.2 LD)	0.977 AU (146.2 million km; 90.8 million mi; 380 LD)	14.3	39.6	77.7°

=== Confirmation as periodic ===
Perihelion distance at different epochs
Epoch	Perihelion (AU)	Period (years)
1772	0.99	6.87
1805	0.91	6.74
1826	0.90	6.72
1832	0.88	6.65
1846	0.86	6.60
1852	0.86	6.62

It was Wilhelm von Biela, an army officer serving at the fortress town of Josefstadt, who observed the comet during its 1826 perihelion approach (on February 27) and calculated its orbit, discovering it to be periodic with a period of 6.6 years. At the time it was only the third comet known to be periodic, after comets 1P/Halley and 2P/Encke. The comet was named after Biela, although there was initially some controversy due to a later but independent discovery by Jean-Félix Adolphe Gambart, who also provided the first mathematical proof linking the 1826 and 1805 comets (letters from Biela and Gambart were published in the same issue of the Astronomische Nachrichten). A third claim was made by Thomas Clausen, who had independently linked the comets.

Olbers in 1828 predicted that in 2500 years, a collision with earth was probable. This became the framing story of The Year 4338: Petersburg Letters.

The comet appeared as predicted during its 1832 apparition, when it was first recovered by John Herschel on 24 September. The orbital elements and ephemeris calculated by Olbers for this return, and updated by Marie-Charles Damoiseau to take into account the gravitational effects of the planets, created something of a popular sensation, as they showed that the comet's coma would likely pass through the Earth's orbit around October 29, but at an Earth distance of about 0.55 AU (82 million km). Subsequent predictions, in the media of the time, of the Earth's likely destruction overlooked the fact that the Earth itself would not reach this point until November 30, a month later, as pointed out by François Arago in an article designed to allay public fears. He put the probability of collision to 1/281 million, though admitted that the comet tail gases may cause "the death of all animals, or produce epidemics".

Despite this, the fact that Biela's Comet was the only comet known to intersect the Earth's orbit was to make it of particular interest, both to astronomers and the public, during the 19th century. In 1832, Greek-Austrian astronomer Georgios Konstantinos Vouris published his own calculations of the elliptical orbit of the comet entitled: Elliptical orbit calculation of Biela's Comet from 96 observations of the year 1832 (Elliptische bahnbere chung des Biela'schen cometen aus 96 beobachtungen des Jahres 1832). His article was a comprehensive overview of the elliptical orbit of Biela's Comet.

The 1839 apparition was extremely unfavourable and no observations were made as the comet never came closer than 1.8 AU from Earth since the comet was on the other side of the Sun. During 1839 the comet never had a solar elongation greater than 50 degrees. Despite its disintegration, Rudolf Falb predicted in 1899 that it would collide with earth on 1899-11-13, destroying it. The prediction "caused no little dismay among the poorer classes of the Continental peasantry".

Biela and Lexell's Comet may have inspired Edgar Allan Poe's The Conversation of Eiros and Charmion (1839).

=== Disintegration ===
As of 1832, Comet Biela had an Earth-MOID (Minimum orbit intersection distance) of only 0.0005 AU (75,000 km). The comet was rediscovered on 26 November 1845, by Francesco de Vico. Initially sporting small, faint nebulosities, subsequent observations showed that something remarkable had happened to it. Matthew Fontaine Maury, observing on 14 January 1846, noted that an apparent companion was located 1 arc minute north of the comet. After this announcement many astronomers began observing the comet, and noted that the two elements (usually referred to as "Comet A" and "Comet B" in modern nomenclature) alternated in brightness, developing parallel tails as they approached perihelion. Some observations indicated an "archway of cometary matter" extending between the two nuclei, which might suggest that the comet had split into many more pieces than two, but the smaller pieces were simply too faint to be observed individually.

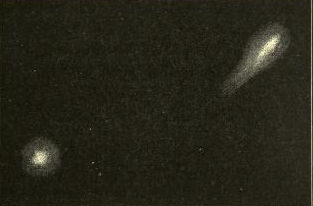
The two components of Biela in 1852, as drawn by Secchi.

In 1852, the comet was again rediscovered more or less as predicted, with "Comet A" being rediscovered first, by Angelo Secchi on August 26. "Comet B" was finally relocated on September 16, and once again both nuclei alternated in brightness during the period of observation. "A" was last detected on this apparition on September 26 and "B" on September 29, in both cases by Otto Wilhelm Struve. Subsequent orbital calculations indicated that the nuclei had probably split around 500 days before the 1845 apparition, though more recent work has determined that it may have occurred near aphelion in late 1842.

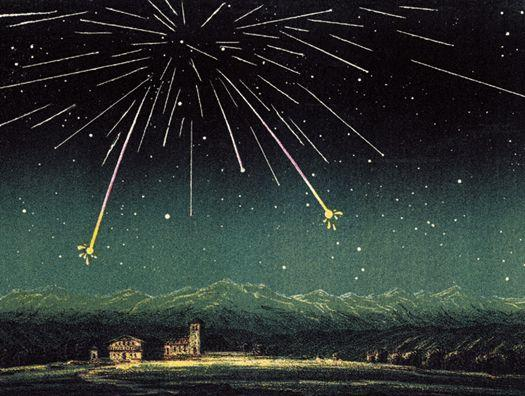
The Andromedid or Bielid meteors as seen on the night of 27 November 1872.

Neither part could be found on their predicted periodic returns in 1859 (in any case an unfavorable return for viewing), 1865, or 1872. However, on 27 November 1872, a brilliant meteor shower (3,000 per hour) was observed radiating from the part of the sky where the comet had been predicted to cross in September 1872. This was the date when Earth intersected the 1839 and 1846 meteoroid streams. These meteors became known as the Andromedids or "Bielids" and it seems apparent that they were produced by the breakup of the comet. The meteors were seen again on subsequent occasions for the rest of the 19th century, but have now faded away, due to gravitational perturbations moving the node outside of Earth's orbit.

== Possible observations and searches ==
There were, however, inconclusive observations during the 1865 and 1872 returns. Charles Talmage, using ephemerides provided by John Russell Hind, claimed to have briefly observed a nebulous object in approximately the right position in November 1865. James Buckingham also observed two nebulosities in 1865 after studying Hind's predictions, but Hind subsequently stated that they were unlikely to be Biela's Comet, as they were much closer together than the two components of the comet should have been. A puzzling observation recorded as X/1872 X1, seen by N. R. Pogson in late 1872 from the Madras Observatory, was also speculated to be a recovery of Biela's Comet, though once again this was later shown to have been unlikely.

Despite the apparent destruction of the comet, there were a number of searches for it during the later 20th century. Brian G. Marsden and Zdeněk Sekanina attempted to calculate a likely orbit for any remaining parts of the comet; it was during a search using Marsden's calculations that Luboš Kohoutek discovered C/1973 E1 (Kohoutek). It has been calculated that the mass of the debris left in the Andromedid meteor stream is still much less than the total mass of the comet. Given that it is more likely that the main mass loss occurred near aphelion before the 1845 apparition, it seems possible that fragment A at least may still exist as a 'dormant' comet.

There have been several attempts to identify objects discovered subsequently either as Biela's Comet or as a remnant of it. The German astronomer Karl Ristenpart attempted several times to prove a link with the comet now known as 18D/Perrine–Mrkos, which had a very similar orbit to Biela apart from a differing argument of perihelion. Despite this, it was not possible to prove any relationship and Perrine–Mrkos, an intrinsically faint object, has itself since been lost. Comet 207P/NEAT, discovered in 2001 by the Near-Earth Asteroid Tracking (NEAT) survey, was also found to have a similar orbit to Biela's Comet, and it was initially thought that it was in some way possibly related to it.

=== 2023 ===
Propagating the very dated orbit from the 1800s, there was speculation that Biela could pass around 0.2 AU (30 million km) from Earth in late October 2023 and come to perihelion in December 2023, but Biela could just as easily be out by the orbit of Jupiter. The 1649 meteoroid stream was expected to generate a modest increase in the December 2023 activity of the Andromedids.

== Meteoric impacts ==
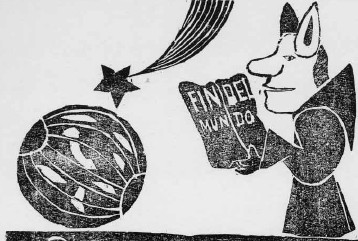
Biela's Comet was the subject of several panics over close approaches to Earth. An 1877 newspaper illustration from Chile, captioned "inevitable impact of the Earth with Comet Biela"

Biela has sometimes been proposed as the source of meteoric impacts on Earth.

A fringe theory links together several major fires that occurred simultaneously in America, including the Great Chicago Fire, the Great Michigan Fire, and the Peshtigo Fire, claiming that they were caused by fragments of Biela's Comet striking the Earth, in October 1871. The theory was first proposed by Ignatius L. Donnelly in 1883, and was revived in a 1985 book and further explored in an unpublished 2004 scientific paper. However, experts dispute such a scenario – meteorites in fact are cold to the touch when they reach the Earth's surface, and there are no credible reports of any fire anywhere having been started by a meteorite. Given the low tensile strength of such bodies, if a fragment of an icy comet were to strike the Earth, the most likely outcome would be for it to disintegrate in the upper atmosphere, leading to a meteor air burst.

On 27 November 1885, an iron meteorite fell in northern Mexico, at the same time as a 15,000 per hour outburst of the Andromedid meteor shower. The Mazapil meteorite has sometimes been attributed to the comet, but this idea has been out of favor since the 1950s as the processes of differentiation required to produce an iron body are not believed to occur in comets.

== Importance in the history of the concept of luminiferous ether ==
Biela's Comet (and Comet Encke) had a role in the now-discredited concept of luminiferous aether: its orbit was found to be shrinking in size, which was ascribed to the drag of an ether through which it orbited.

== Bibliography ==
- Kronk, Gary W.; Meyer, Maik; Seargent, David A. J. (2003). Cometography: A Catalog of Comets. Vol. 2: 1800–1899. Cambridge University Press. ISBN 978-0-521-58505-7.

Numbered comets
Previous; 2P/Encke	Biela's Comet	Next; 4P/Faye
