= 25D/Neujmin =

Lost comet

Discovery
- Discovered by: Grigory Neujmin
- Discovery date: 24 February 1916

Designations
- MPC designation: D/1916 D1; D/1926 V2
- Alternative designations: Neujmin 2; 1916 II, 1927 I; 1916a, 1926g

Orbital characteristics
- Epoch: 21 March 1927 (JD 2424960.5)
- Observation arc: 10.94 years (Not observed in 99 years)
- Number of observations: 116
- Aphelion: 4.840 AU
- Perihelion: 1.338 AU
- Semi-major axis: 3.089 AU
- Eccentricity: 0.56682
- Orbital period: 5.429 years
- Inclination: 10.639°
- Longitude of ascending node: 328.72°
- Argument of periapsis: 193.70°
- Mean anomaly: 11.577°
- Last perihelion: 11 May 2025? (unobserved)
- Next perihelion: 24 Feb 2031? (Lost since 1927)
- T_{Jupiter}: 2.932
- Earth MOID: 0.35 AU
- Comet total magnitude (M1): 12.5
- Comet nuclear magnitude (M2): 16.0

25D/Neujmin, otherwise known as Comet Neujmin 2, is a periodic comet in the Solar System discovered by Grigory N. Neujmin (Simeis) on February 24, 1916. It was last observed on February 10, 1927, and has not been observed in 99 years.

It was confirmed by George Van Biesbroeck (Yerkes Observatory, Wisconsin, United States) and Frank Watson Dyson (Greenwich Observatory, England) on March 1.

A prediction by Andrew Crommelin (Royal Observatory, Greenwich, England) for 1921 was considered unfavourable and no observations were made. The comet was recovered in 1926. Searches in 1932 and 1937 were unsuccessful.

Consequently, this comet has remained a lost comet since 1927. As of 2026 and using the JPL Horizons nominal orbit, the comet is still expected to come to perihelion around 1.45 AU (217 million km) from the Sun.

The comet has not been observed during the last 18 perihelion passages: 1932, 1937, 1943, 1948, 1954, 1959, 1965, 1971, 1976, 1981, 1987, 1992, 1998, 2003, 2008, 2014, 2019, and 2025.

Numbered comets
Previous; 24P/Schaumasse	25D/Neujmin	Next; 26P/Grigg–Skjellerup
