= Andromedids =

Meteor shower is associated with Biela's Comet

- Parent body: 3D/Biela

Radiant
- Constellation: Upper Pisces (South of Triangulum Galaxy and Andromeda)
- Right ascension: 01^{h} 23^{m}
- Declination: +28°

Properties
- Occurs during: September 25 – December 6
- Date of peak: November 6
- Velocity: 18.1 km/s
- Zenithal hourly rate: <2

The Andromedids meteor shower is associated with Biela's Comet, the showers occurring as Earth passes through old streams left by the comet's tail. The comet was observed to have broken up by 1846; further drift of the pieces by 1852 suggested the moment of breakup was in either 1842 or early 1843, when the comet was near Jupiter. The breakup led to particularly spectacular showers in subsequent cycles (particularly in 1872 and 1885).

In the early 19th century, before the break-up of comet 3D/Biela, the radiant was in Cassiopeia. In the last century the radiant of the modern weaker meteor shower was generally in the constellation of Andromeda as the name of the shower suggests, but due to its age and diffuseness meteors may appear to come from the neighbouring constellations, such as Pisces (near the star Upsilon Piscium), Triangulum and Cassiopeia.

== Historical appearances ==
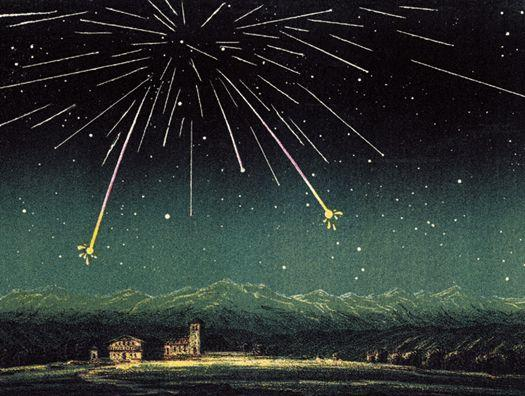
The Andromedids of 27 November 1872, a product of the breakup of Biela's Comet several decades previously.

The first known sighting of the Andromedids was December 6, 1741, over St Petersburg, Russia. Further strong showers were witnessed in 1798, 1825, 1830, 1838 and 1847. The Andromedids produced spectacular displays of several thousand meteors per hour in 1872 and 1885, as a result of Earth crossing the comet's debris stream. Schmidt, observing from Athens, said that the 1872 shower consisted mainly of faint (5th to 6th magnitude) meteors with "broad and smoke-like" trains and a predominantly orange or reddish colouration. In England, Lowe estimated the same shower as producing at least 58,600 visible meteors between 5.50 and 10.30 pm, observed that the meteors were much slower than the Leonids, and noted noises "like very distant gun-shots" several times to the north-west. In Burma, the 1885 shower was perceived as a fateful omen and was indeed followed swiftly by the collapse of the Konbaung dynasty and the conquest by Britain.

The November 27, 1885 shower event was the occasion of the first known photograph of a meteor, taken by Austro-Hungarian astronomer, Ladislaus Weinek, who caught a 7mm-long trail on a plate at his Prague observing station.

Andromedids
Date	Stream	ZHR
1798-Dec-06		100
1872-Nov-27	1846	7000
1885-Nov-27	1852	6000
1892-Nov-24		≈200
1899-Nov-24		100
1904-Nov-21		20
1940-Nov-15	1852	30

== Current activity ==
Since the 19th century the Andromedids have faded so substantially that they are no longer generally visible to the naked eye, though some activity is still observable each year in mid-November given suitable detection equipment. In recent years, peak activity had been less than three meteors per hour, around November 9 to 14. Andromedid activity of November comes from the newest streams, while that of early December comes from the oldest.

Canadian Meteor Orbit Radar (CMOR) data detected a spike of 30 meteors per hour on November 27, 2008. On December 4, 2011, six Canadian radar stations detected 50 meteors in an hour and the activity was likely from the 1649 stream. During the 2012 shower an inconspicuous maximum occurred on November 9. On December 8, 2013, Meteor specialist Peter Brown reported that the Canadian Meteor Orbit Radar had recorded an outburst from the Andromedid meteors around December 6. Scientists postulated a somewhat weaker return in 2018, but a yield of up to 200 meteors an hour in 2023.

Andromedids
Date	Stream	ZHR (Radar)
2008-Nov-27	1649	30
2011-Dec-04	1649	50
2012-Nov-09	1812	low
2021-Nov-28	1655	≈100
2023-Dec-02 19:00 UT	1649	200? (naked eye?)
