= Meanings of minor-planet names: 7001–8000 =

As minor planet discoveries are confirmed, they are given a permanent number by the IAU's Minor Planet Center (MPC), and the discoverers can then submit names for them, following the IAU's naming conventions. The list below concerns those minor planets in the specified number-range that have received names, and explains the meanings of those names.

Official naming citations of newly named small Solar System bodies are approved and published in a bulletin by IAU's Working Group for Small Bodies Nomenclature (WGSBN). Before May 2021, citations were published in MPC's Minor Planet Circulars for many decades. Recent citations can also be found on the JPL Small-Body Database (SBDB). Until his death in 2016, German astronomer Lutz D. Schmadel compiled these citations into the Dictionary of Minor Planet Names (DMP) and regularly updated the collection.

Based on Paul Herget's The Names of the Minor Planets, Schmadel also researched the unclear origin of numerous asteroids, most of which had been named prior to World War II. This article incorporates text from this source, which is in the public domain: SBDB New namings may only be added to this list below after official publication as the preannouncement of names is condemned. The WGSBN publishes a comprehensive guideline for the naming rules of non-cometary small Solar System bodies.

== 7001–7100 ==
Named minor planet	Provisional	This minor planet was named for...	Ref · Catalog
7001 Noether	1955 EH	Emmy Noether (1882–1935), German mathematician	JPL · 7001
7002 Bronshten	1971 OV	Vitalii Aleksandrovich Bronshten (1918–2004), Russian meteor researcher	JPL · 7002
7003 Zoyamironova	1976 SZ_{9}	Zoya Sergeevna Mironova (1913–2008), Russian physician, specialist in sports medicine and trauma specialist to the Russian cosmonauts	JPL · 7003
7004 Markthiemens	1979 OB_{9}	Mark H. Thiemens (born 1950), American chemist and areologist	JPL · 7004
7005 Henninghaack	1981 ET_{25}	Henning Haack (born 1961), Danish curator of meteorites at the Geologisk Museum (Geological Museum) of the København Universitet (University of Copenhagen)	JPL · 7005
7006 Folco	1981 ER_{31}	Luigi Folco (born 1965), Italian curator of meteorites at the National Museum of Antarctica ("Felice Ippolito") of the Universities of Genova, Siena and Trieste	JPL · 7006
7007 Timjull	1981 EK_{34}	A. J. Timothy Jull (born 1951), American meteoriticist, editor of the journal Meteoritics and Planetary Science	JPL · 7007
7008 Pavlov	1985 QH_{5}	Nikolaj Nikiforovich Pavlov (1902–1985), Russian astronomer	MPC · 7008
7009 Hume	1987 QU_{1}	David Hume (1711–1776), British philosopher	MPC · 7009
7010 Locke	1987 QH_{3}	John Locke (1632–1704), British philosopher	MPC · 7010
7011 Worley	1987 SK_{1}	Charles Edmund Worley (1935–1997), American astronomer †	MPC · 7011
7012 Hobbes	1988 CH_{2}	Thomas Hobbes (1588–1679), British political philosopher	MPC · 7012
7013 Trachet	1988 RS_{4}	Tim Trachet (born 1958), Belgian journalist and science writer. He is honorary chairman and general secretary of the Belgian skeptical organization, SKEPP, and the vice-chairman of the European Council of Skeptical Organisations, which he co-founded in 1994.	JPL · 7013
7014 Nietzsche	1989 GT_{4}	Friedrich Nietzsche (1844–1900), German philosopher	MPC · 7014
7015 Schopenhauer	1990 QC_{8}	Arthur Schopenhauer (1788–1860), German philosopher	MPC · 7015
7016 Conandoyle	1991 YG	Arthur Conan Doyle (1859–1930), Scottish writer and physician, best known for his character Sherlock Holmes and his detective fiction	JPL · 7016
7017 Uradowan	1992 CE_{2}	The Urado Bay, located in Kochi, Japan	JPL · 7017
7019 Tagayuichan	1992 EM_{1}	"Tagayuichan", a little girl dressed as a shrine maiden, is the official mascot of Taga Town in Shiga Prefecture.	JPL · 7019
7020 Yourcenar	1992 GR_{2}	Marguerite Yourcenar (1903–1987), pseudonym of French-Belgian-American writer Marguerite de Crayencour	MPC · 7020
7021 Tomiokamachi	1992 JN_{1}	Tomiokamachi, a town in Fukushima prefecture, Japan.	JPL · 7021
7023 Heiankyo	1992 KE	"Heiankyo", meaning "Peaceful Capital", is another name of Kyoto, Japan	JPL · 7023
7024 Impey	1992 PA_{4}	Christopher David Impey, British astronomer.	IAU · 7024
7026 Gabrielasilang	1993 QB_{1}	Gabriela Silang (1731–1763) was a leader of the Filipino fight for independence from Spain. A statue honoring her in Manila depicts her on a rearing horse, brandishing a bolo knife.	JPL · 7026
7027 Toshihanda	1993 XT	Toshihiro Handa (born 1959), a research associate at the Institute of Astronomy, University of Tokyo.	JPL · 7027
7028 Tachikawa	1993 XC_{1}	Tachikawa, a suburban city west of Tokyo. JPL	MPC · 7028
7030 Colombini	1993 YU	Ermes Colombini (born 1956), an Italian amateur astronomer at San Vittore Observatory	MPC · 7030
7031 Kazumiyoshioka	1994 UU	Kazumi Yoshioka (born 1953), an amateur astronomer who has published articles on astrophotography since 1988.	JPL · 7031
7032 Hitchcock	1994 VC_{2}	Alfred Hitchcock (1899–1980), a British-born American movie director and producer.	JPL · 7032
7035 Gomi	1995 BD_{3}	Kazuaki Gomi (1911–2000), amateur astronomer and long-time observer of variable stars.	JPL · 7035
7036 Kentarohirata	1995 BH_{3}	Kentaro Hirata, an amateur astronomer in Yanagawa city.	JPL · 7036
7037 Davidlean	1995 BK_{3}	David Lean (1908–1991), British film director.	JPL · 7037
7038 Tokorozawa	1995 DJ_{2}	Tokorozawa City is located in the south of Saitama Prefecture, Japan. The first airport in Japan was opened there in 1911	JPL · 7038
7039 Yamagata	1996 GO_{2}	The Yamagata Prefecture in Japan	MPC · 7039
7040 Harwood	2642 P-L	Margaret Harwood (1885–1979) was an American astronomer and the first Director of the Maria Mitchell Observatory	MPC · 7040
7041 Nantucket	4081 P-L	Nantucket Island, Massachusetts, United States, where the Maria Mitchell Observatory is located	MPC · 7041
7042 Carver	1933 FE_{1}	George Washington Carver (1860–1943), credited by many as the first black American scientist.	JPL · 7042
7043 Godart	1934 RB	Odon Godart (1913–1996), Belgian mathematician.	JPL · 7043
7046 Reshetnev	1977 QG_{2}	Mikhail Fedorovich Reshetnev (1924–1996), an authority on theoretical and applied mechanics.	JPL · 7046
7047 Lundström	1978 RZ_{9}	Magnus Lundström (born 1967), Swedish astronomer † Archived 2007-06-24 at the Wayback Machine	MPC · 7047
7048 Chaussidon	1981 EH_{34}	Marc Chaussidon (born 1961), French geochemist	JPL · 7048
7049 Meibom	1981 UV_{21}	Anders Meibom (born 1970), Danish meteoriticist	JPL · 7049
7050 Shanekelly	1982 FE_{3}	Shane Thomas Kelly, Irish meteorological officer.	IAU · 7050
7051 Sean	1985 JY	Sean Colin Woodard, grandson of the discoverers Carolyn and Eugene Shoemaker	JPL · 7051
7052 Octaviabutler	1988 VQ_{2}	Octavia E. Butler (1947–2006) was an African American author. Her work won multiple Hugo and Nebula awards and is praised for its incisive social criticism.	JPL · 7052
7054 Brehm	1989 GL_{8}	Christian Ludwig Brehm (1787–1864) and Alfred Edmund Brehm (1829–1884), father and son, are two Thuringian naturalists.	JPL · 7054
7055 Fabiopagan	1989 KB	Fabio Pagan (born 1946) is an Italian science journalist who covers space travel, astrobiology and physics. He has written for Trieste's Il Piccolo newspaper and he was a radio presenter on RAI, Italy's public national broadcaster. He was also press officer at the International Centre for Theoretical Physics in Trieste	JPL · 7055
7056 Kierkegaard	1989 SE_{2}	Søren Kierkegaard (1813–1855), Danish religious philosopher	MPC · 7056
7057 Al-Fārābī	1990 QL_{2}	Al-Farabi (c. 872–951) spent much of his life in Baghdad as a prominent philosopher, scientist and music scholar. He revived and internationalized the Aristotelian tradition, translated the philosopher's works from Greek to Arabic, and preserved and expanded upon them in his own writings	JPL · 7057
7058 Al-Ṭūsī	1990 SN_{1}	Sharaf al-Dīn al-Ṭūsī (1135-c. 1213) was a Persian mathematician and astronomer who invented the linear astrolabe and developed new algebraic methods for solving certain types of cubic equations with positive solutions	JPL · 7058
7059 Van Dokkum	1990 SK_{3}	Pieter van Dokkum (born 1972), a Dutch astronomer who studies the evolution of galaxies over cosmic time	JPL · 7059
7060 Al-ʿIjliya	1990 SF_{11}	Al-ʻIjliyyah a 10th-century astrolabe maker working in the court of Sayf Al-Dawla, who was the emir of Aleppo from 945 to 967. Her father was also an astrolabe maker, and both were apprentices of Nastulus	JPL · 7060
7061 Pieri	1991 PE_{1}	David C. Pieri (born 1949), American planetary geologist and volcanologist at NASA's Jet Propulsion Laboratory.	JPL · 7061
7062 Meslier	1991 PY_{5}	Jean Meslier (1664–1729), a French priest and philosopher	MPC · 7062
7063 Johnmichell	1991 UK	John Michell (1724–1793), an English clergyman and member of the Royal Society who studied geology, astronomy and gravity. He showed that gravity might explain double stars and star clusters, and he was the first to suggest the existence of black holes.	JPL · 7063
7064 Montesquieu	1992 OC_{5}	Montesquieu (1689–1755), French political thinker	MPC · 7064
7065 Fredschaaf	1992 PU_{2}	Fred Schaaf (born 1954) has spent a lifetime interpreting the night sky for the public. His monthly columns for Sky & Telescope magazine, begun in 1993, have introduced countless readers to the simple joy of locating a planet, bright star or constellation. He has also authored more than a dozen books on popular astronomy	JPL · 7065
7066 Nessus	1993 HA_{2}	Nessus, mythological Greek centaur	MPC · 7066
7067 Kiyose	1993 XE	Kiyose City, a western suburb of Tokyo, Japan	JPL · 7067
7068 Minowa	1994 WD_{1}	Toshiyuki Minowa (1918–), Japanese amateur astronomer	MPC · 7068
7072 Beijingdaxue	1996 CB_{8}	University of Beijing, founded in 1898, and the oldest national university in China	MPC · 7072
7073 Rudbelia	1972 RU_{1}	Ol'ga Ivanovna Belyaeva (née Rudneva) is a teacher of English at the Moscow College and Institute of Economics, Politics and Law.	JPL · 7073
7074 Muckea	1977 RD_{3}	Hermann Mucke, (1935–2019), director of the Urania Sternwarte and planetarium in Vienna.	JPL · 7074
7075 Sadovnichij	1979 SN_{4}	Viktor Sadovnichiy (born 1939), Russian mathematician, Rector of the Moscow State University	MPC · 7075
7076 Divnýjanko	1980 UC	Janko Kráľ (1822–1876), a Slovak poet.	IAU · 7076
7077 Shermanschultz	1982 VZ	Sherman Schultz (1922–), American astronomy teacher at Macalester College for over 30 years, and who made many contributions to amateur telescope making †	MPC · 7077
7078 Unojönsson	1985 UH_{3}	Uno Jönsson (born 1937), Swedish astronomer, author and friend of the discoverer Claes-Ingvar Lagerkvist	MPC · 7078
7079 Baghdad	1986 RR	Baghdad was founded near one of the foremost cities of old Mesopotamia by the Arab Abbasid dynasty in the eighth century. Its beauty has inspired many poets and musicians, and it is still well known from stories such as Thousand and One Nights.	JPL · 7079
7081 Ludibunda	1987 QF_{7}	From the Latin ludibundus, meaning "merry or joyful", Ludibunda is a frolicsome, playful woman, on the same pilgrimage as 6620 Peregrina, but of strongly contrasting temper.	JPL · 7081
7082 La Serena	1987 YL_{1}	La Serena, Chile, a beautiful small city near the Pacific, about 600 km north of Santiago de Chile.	JPL · 7082
7083 Kant	1989 CL_{3}	Immanuel Kant (1724–1804), German philosopher	MPC · 7083
7085 Franksienkiewicz	1991 PE	Frank Sienkiewicz, American education specialist and project engineer.	IAU · 7085
7086 Bopp	1991 TA_{1}	Thomas Bopp (1949–2018), American amateur astronomer and discoverer of Comet Hale–Bopp	MPC · 7086
7087 Lewotsky	1991 TG_{4}	Kristin and Gretchen Lewotsky, friends of the American discoverer Eleanor Helin	MPC · 7087
7088 Ishtar	1992 AA	Ishtar, Akkadian goddess	MPC · 7088
7091 Maryfields	1992 JA	Mary Fields (c. 1832–1914) was an African-American folk hero and trailblazer. She was a mail carrier in Montana in her 60s, braving harsh weather but never missing a day. Loved by her community, her birthday was a local holiday. She refused to be limited by social norms or laws.	JPL · 7091
7092 Cadmus	1992 LC	Cadmus, Greek mythological figure	MPC · 7092
7093 Jonleake	1992 OT	Jonathan Richard Leake (born 1959), British journalist, Science and Environment Editor for The Sunday Times	JPL · 7093
7094 Godaisan	1992 RJ	Godaisan, a mountain in the Kōchi Prefecture of Japan.	JPL · 7094
7095 Lamettrie	1992 SB_{22}	Julien Offray de La Mettrie (1709–1751), French medical doctor and philosopher	MPC · 7095
7096 Napier	1992 VM	William M. Napier (born 1940), Scottish astronomer	MPC · 7096
7097 Yatsuka	1993 TF	Yatsuka, a town in the Shimane Prefecture and home of Japanese discoverer Hiroshi Abe	JPL · 7097
7098 Réaumur	1993 TK_{39}	René Antoine Ferchault de Réaumur (1683–1757), a French scientist and important entomologist.	JPL · 7098
7099 Feuerbach	1996 HX_{25}	Ludwig Andreas Feuerbach (1804–1872), German philosopher and moralist	MPC · 7099
7100 Martin Luther	1360 T-2	Martin Luther (1483–1546), German theologian and religious reformer	JPL · 7100

== 7101–7200 ==
back to top

Named minor planet	Provisional	This minor planet was named for...	Ref · Catalog
7101 Haritina	1930 UX	Ioana Haritina Mogosanu (born 1973), populariser of astronomy and planetarium presenter at the Carter Observatory in New Zealand.	JPL · 7101
7102 Neilbone	1936 NB	Neil Bone (born 1959), Scottish amateur astronomer, author and broadcaster (Src)	JPL · 7102
7103 Wichmann	1953 GH	Moritz Ludwig George Wichmann (1821–1859) was an ardent observer of minor planets. A student of Bessel, he observed with the famous Königsberg heliometer. In 1853 he published a determination of the parallax of Groombridge 1830. The name was suggested by L. D. Schmadel	JPL · 7103
7104 Manyousyu	1977 DU	Manyousyu, earliest collection of Japanese poetry	MPC · 7104
7105 Yousyozan	1977 DB_{1}	Yousyozan is a 400-meter high mountain to the south of the Okayama station of the National Astronomical Observatory of Japan. Site testing for the observatory was conducted for about a year on this mountain, resulting in the observatory's construction. It was opened in 1960	JPL · 7105
7106 Kondakov	1978 PM_{3}	Aleksandr Konstantinovich Kondakov (born 1928), Soviet chemist and researcher on agricultural fertilizers	MPC · 7106
7107 Peiser	1980 PB_{1}	Benny Josef Peiser (born 1957), British social anthropologist	JPL · 7107
7108 Nefedov	1981 RM_{3}	Oleg Matveevich Nefedov (born 1931), vice president of the Russian Academy of Sciences and chairman of the National Committee of Russian chemists. An outstanding scientist in the field of physical, synthetic and technical organic chemistry, he is best known for his fundamental research on highly reactive intermediates and small cycles. Name proposed by the discoverer following a suggestion by the Institute of Applied Astronomy	JPL · 7108
7109 Heine	1983 RT_{4}	Heinrich Heine (1797–1856), German poet. The name was suggested on the occasion of the 200th anniversary of Heine's birth.	MPC · 7109
7110 Johnpearse	1983 XH_{1}	John Marshall Pearse (born 1930), Australian mechanical technician at the Perth Observatory (1981–2006)	JPL · 7110
7112 Ghislaine	1986 GV	Ghislaine Crozaz (born 1939), Belgian meteoriticist and cosmochemist	MPC · 7112
7113 Ostapbender	1986 SD_{2}	Ostap Bender, a fictional character in the novels The Twelve Chairs and The Little Golden Calf written by Soviet authors Ilya Ilf and Yevgeni Petrov	MPC · 7113
7114 Weinek	1986 WN_{7}	Ladislaus Weinek (1848–1913), a Czech astronomer and the ninth director of the Klementinum observatory in Prague, collaborated with Küstner in the discovery of polar motion. He published a lunar atlas based on photographs from the Lick Observatory. The name was suggested by J. Ticha and M. Šolc.	JPL · 7114
7115 Franciscuszeno	1986 WO_{7}	Franciscus Zeno (1734–1781), Czech astronomer, palaeontologist and professor of mathematics at Prague University, was the second director of the Klementinum observatory in Prague. The name was suggested by J. Ticha and M. Šolc.	JPL · 7115
7116 Mentall	1986 XX	E. Talmadge Mentall (born 1927), American astronomical atlas illustrator, who retired from a drafting career to join Sky Publishing Corporation in 1994. With his artistic skill and lifelong enthusiasm for astronomy, "Tal" soon played a pivotal role in the Millennium Star Atlas (1997), a joint undertaking with the European Space Agency's Hipparcos project. He meticulously drafted all the outlines of nebulae and measured the orientations of 2000 galaxies not available from the literature. Name proposed by R. W. Sinnott, endorsed by B. G. Marsden and the discoverer.	JPL · 7116
7117 Claudius	1988 CA_{1}	Matthias Claudius (1740–1815), German poet and writer. He was an editor of the journal Messenger of Wandsbeck and is well known for his evening song Der Mond ist aufgegangen ( "The moon has risen").	MPC · 7117
7118 Kuklov	1988 VD_{5}	Kuklov, village in Czech Republic	MPC · 7118
7119 Hiera	1989 AV_{2}	Hiera, mythical person related to Trojan War	MPC · 7119
7120 Davidgavine	1989 AD_{3}	David Myles Gavine (1937–1920), a Scottish astronomy historian.	JPL · 7120
7121 Busch	1989 AL_{7}	Wilhelm Busch (1832–1908), a German poet, who became world-renowned for his popular humorous and satiric picture stories.	MPC · 7121
7122 Iwasaki	1989 EN_{2}	Kazuaki Iwasaki (born 1935), amateur astronomer and world-renowned space artist. His work has been frequently exhibited and he has published many books on the subject of space art. In July 1998 he opened his own space art gallery in Ito City, Shizuoka Prefecture. Name proposed by the discoverers following a suggestion by T. Sato and A. Fujii	JPL · 7122
7124 Glinos	1990 OJ_{4}	Tom Glinos (born 1960), Canadian astronomer †	MPC · 7124
7125 Eitarodate	1991 CN_{1}	Eitaro Date (1912–1953), Japanese amateur astronomer	JPL · 7125
7126 Cureau	1991 GJ_{4}	Marin Cureau de la Chambre, French medical doctor and scientist	MPC · 7126
7127 Stifter	1991 RD_{3}	Adalbert Stifter (1805–1868), Austrian poet, novelist and narrator	MPC · 7127
7128 Misawa	1991 SM_{1}	Katsue Misawa (1885–1937). Although he received only a limited education, through his own efforts he became a junior-high-school geography teacher. His unique teaching practices are highly appreciated in the history of Japanese education. In astronomy, he was the real pioneer of sunspot observation in Japan, systematically observing sunspots from 1921 until 1934, when failing eyesight prevented it. His data were invaluable because in those days foreign data arrived in Japan only after a long delay. Name proposed by the discoverers following a suggestion by K. Gomi, T. Sato, K. Fujimori and A. Fujii	JPL · 7128
7130 Klepper	1992 HR_{4}	Jochen Klepper (1903–1942), a German writer, lyric poet and journalist	MPC · 7130
7131 Longtom	1992 YL	Longtom, the nine-pound cannon in Treasure Island, is the nickname of the Nikon 10-cm refractor used regularly by Hoei Nojiri (1885–1977), who ordered the telescope and translated Stevenson's novel into Japanese in 1928. The telescope was at one time also used by Tokyo astronomer Koichiro Tomita	JPL · 7131
7132 Casulli	1993 SE	Silvano Casulli (born 1944), Italian amateur astronomer	MPC · 7132
7133 Kasahara	1993 TX_{1}	Shin Kasahara (born 1953), doctor of dentistry and senior lecturer at Tohoku University. An amateur astronomer, he has been enthusiastically engaged in positional observation and orbit calculation of minor planets and comets since 1973. He also played an important role in designing and constructing the biggest portable telescope in Japan, the 84-cm Chiro Memorial Telescope, which went on a national tour to allow the observation of comet 1P/Halley. Name proposed by the discoverers following a suggestion by M. Koishikawa and A. Fujii	JPL · 7133
7134 Ikeuchisatoru	1993 UY	Satoru Ikeuchi (born 1944) works mainly on the evolution of the interstellar medium and the formation of large-scale structure of the universe. He is a member of the Science Council of Japan and served as the Japanese national representative to the IAU since 1997	JPL · 7134
7136 Yokohasuo	1993 VK_{2}	Yoko Hasuo (born 1952), the wife of Japanese amateur astronomer Ryuichi Hasuo, was cotranslator of the International Halley Watch manual into Japanese. She has been supportive of her husband's activity as a member of the Comet Conference and Cometary Summer School in Japan (also see 6887 Hasuo)	JPL · 7136
7137 Ageo	1994 AQ_{1}	The Japanese city of Ageo, located north of Tokyo in Saitama Prefecture. The name was suggested by M. Sekine.	JPL · 7137
7139 Tsubokawa	1994 CV_{2}	Ietsune Tsubokawa (1918–1994), Japanese astronomer and fifth director of the International Latitude Observatory in Mizusawa during 1976–1986, and a former director of the Earthquake Research Institute, University of Tokyo.	MPC · 7139
7140 Osaki	1994 EE_{1}	Yoji Osaki (born 1938) works mainly in stellar physics and served as president of the Japan Astronomical Society during 1999–2000. In 1974 he proposed the disk-instability model for outbursts of dwarf novae, a model that is now widely accepted	JPL · 7140
7141 Bettarini	1994 EZ_{1}	Otello Bettarini (1905–1982), an Italian pioneer who built the discovering Cima Ekar Station (098)	MPC · 7141
7142 Spinoza	1994 PC_{19}	Baruch Spinoza (Benedict de Spinoza), Dutch-Jewish philosopher ‡	MPC · 7142
7143 Haramura	1995 WU_{41}	Haramura is a village in Nagano prefecture, 200 km east of Tokyo. A large star party is held there each summer	JPL · 7143
7144 Dossobuono	1996 KQ	The northeastern Italian village of Dossobuono, province of Verona, where the discovering Madonna di Dossobuono Observatory (560) is located.	MPC · 7144
7145 Linzexu	1996 LO	Lin Zexu (1785–1850), Chinese scholar and official during the Qing dynasty, known for his campaign against drug abuse and drug-related crimes, as well as for his achievements in water conservancy.	MPC · 7145
7146 Konradin	3034 P-L	Konradin Ferrari d'Occhieppo (1907–2007), Austrian professor emeritus of astronomy of Vienna University and member of the Austrian Academy of Sciences (bio-de).	MPC · 7146
7147 Feijth	4015 P-L	Hendrik Feijth (born 1944), Dutch amateur astronomer and observer of variable stars †	MPC · 7147
7148 Reinholdbien	1047 T-1	Reinhold Bien (born 1947), German astronomer at ARI in Heidelberg.	MPC · 7148
7149 Bernie	3220 T-3	Hans-Heinrich Bernstein (born 1953), German astronomer at ARI in Heidelberg	MPC · 7149
7150 McKellar	1929 TD_{1}	Andrew McKellar (1910–1960), who, in 1941, measured the temperature of interstellar space as about 2.7 Kelvin, based on the rotational spectrum of the cyanogen molecule. This radiation temperature arises from the cosmic primeval fireball and is one of the most fundamental and revealing cosmic parameters	JPL · 7150
7152 Euneus	1973 SH_{1}	Euneus, king of Lemnos and a son of Jason from Greek mythology	MPC · 7152
7153 Vladzakharov	1975 XP_{3}	Vladimir E. Zakharov (born 1939), a Soviet and Russian mathematician and theoretical physicist. He was a former director of the Landau Institute for Theoretical Physics near Moscow in Russia.	MPC · 7153
7154 Zhangmaolin	1979 MJ_{5}	Zhang Maolin (1991–2019) was a young Chinese astronomer. After completing an engineering degree at Tsinghua University, he entered the PhD program in astronomy at Leiden University. He studied radio galaxies with the LOFAR radio telescope, but died prematurely in a house fire before he could complete his degree.	JPL · 7154
7156 Flaviofusipecci	1981 EC_{2}	Flavio Fusi Pecci (born 1948) is an Italian astrophysicist who has made major contributions to the study of globular clusters.	JPL · 7156
7157 Lofgren	1981 EC_{8}	Gary E. Lofgren (born 1941), American planetary scientist and curator of lunar materials at NASA's Johnson Space Center	JPL · 7157
7158 IRTF	1981 ES_{8}	NASA's Infrared Telescope Facility (IRTF), with its 3-meter telescope on Mauna Kea Observatories, Hawaii.	JPL · 7158
7159 Bobjoseph	1981 EN_{17}	Robert D. Joseph (born 1939), American astronomer and professor of astronomy at the University of Hawaii.	JPL · 7159
7160 Tokunaga	1981 UQ_{29}	Alan T. Tokunaga (born 1949), American astronomer and a division chief for NASA's Infrared Telescope Facility on Mauna Kea	JPL · 7160
7161 Golitsyn	1982 UY_{10}	Mikhail Mikhailovich Golitsyn (1675–1730), a Russian field marshal and governor of Finland, who participated in the Azov campaigns (1695–96) and the Great Northern War (1700–1721).	MPC · 7161
7162 Sidwell	1982 VB_{1}	Daniel R. Sidwell (born 1932), the facility operations manager of the Table Mountain Facility, upon his retirement after 42 years of dedicated service to the Jet Propulsion Laboratory. Sidwell worked with the "wind tunnel" group at JPL's Pasadena facility before moving to Table Mountain in 1976, where he has been a source of dedicated and sustained help beyond the call of duty. Name suggested and citation prepared by J. W. Young	JPL · 7162
7163 Barenboim	1984 DB	Argentinian-born pianist and conductor Daniel Barenboim (born 1942) has been central to bringing classical music to a wide audience. The name was suggested by W. A. Fröger	JPL · 7163
7164 Babadzhanov	1984 ET	Pulat Babadzhanov (born 1930), astronomer and director of the Institute of Astrophysics, Tajik Academy of Sciences, in Dushanbe, Tajikistan. He is an expert in the study of meteors (photography, physics and dynamics), meteoroid streams (evolution), and meteor showers (relation to comets and minor planets).	MPC · 7164
7165 Pendleton	1985 RH	Yvonne Pendleton (born 1957), American astronomer at NASA Ames Research Center, who is a spectroscopist and expert of organic components found in interstellar dust	MPC · 7165
7166 Kennedy	1985 TR	Malcolm Kennedy (1944–1997), Secretary of the Astronomical Society of Glasgow ‡	JPL · 7166
7167 Laupheim	1985 TD_{3}	Robert Clausen (born 1951) and his team at the Laupheim Observatory (German: Volkssternwarte Laupheim) in Germany	MPC · 7167
7169 Linda	1986 TK_{1}	Linda McCartney (1941–1998), wife of Beatle Paul McCartney, member of the musical group Wings, photographer, and author of vegetarian cookbooks. McCartney's strength of purpose as a friend of the environment, of animals, and of all humanity, together with her devotion to her family, provided a shining example to others. Name proposed by the discoverer following a suggestion by J. Dunne, who prepared the citation	JPL · 7169
7170 Livesey	1987 MK	Ron Livesey (born 1929), a Scottish amateur astronomer. He has had a major influence on amateur astronomy, particularly in his native Scotland, and been a key figure in organizing astronomical societies and observational programs, particularly of aurorae.‡	JPL · 7170
7171 Arthurkraus	1988 AT_{1}	Baron Artur Kraus (1854–1930), Czech astronomy benefactor and popularizer	MPC · 7171
7172 Multatuli	1988 DE_{2}	Multatuli, pseudonym of Dutch writer Eduard Douwes Dekker (1820–1887). In 1838 he went to the Dutch East Indies, where he held a number of governmental posts. In 1856 he resigned as assistant commissioner of Lebak, Java, because he was not supported by the government in his struggle to protect the Javanese from exploitation by their own chiefs. Back in Europe, he soon became internationally known with his novel Max Havelaar (1860), which enabled him to plead for justice in Java and to satirize the Dutch middle-class mentality. Name proposed by the discoverer, endorsed by C.-~F. Merks and J. Meeus.	JPL · 7172
7173 Sepkoski	1988 PL_{1}	Jack Sepkoski (1948–1999), an American palaeontologist whose far-reaching work made a major contribution to quantifying the nature of life's diversity through time. The compilation of a huge database, begun while he was at the University of Rochester and continued at the University of Chicago, enabled researchers to combine mathematical modeling and paleoecology with massive data arrays. Together with his colleague David Raup, Sepkoski developed the theory that catastrophic extinction events have a 26-million-year periodicity.	JPL · 7173
7174 Semois	1988 SQ	Semois river, in Wallonia, flowing from Luxembourg and the Ardennes into the river Meuse	JPL · 7174
7175 Janegoodall	1988 TN_{2}	Jane Goodall (born 1934) is an English primatologist, ethologist, anthropologist and UN Messenger of Peace. She has dedicated her life to the study of chimpanzees and fighting to save their habitat. Founder of the Jane Goodall Institute in 1977, she has received many honours for her environmental and humanitarian work.	JPL · 7175
7176 Kuniji	1989 XH	Kuniji Saito (born 1913), who joined the Tokyo Astronomical Observatory in 1936 and was engaged mainly in research on the solar corona. Following his retirement in 1974, he has collected historical materials from Japan, China and other countries to analyze them from the viewpoint of modern astronomy, using computers. He named this field of research "paleoastronomy" and hopes that many other researchers will enter into this kind of research. He also served as president of the Astronomical Society of Japan. Name proposed by the discoverers following a suggestion by A. Fujii and A. Tanno	JPL · 7176
7177 Melvyntaylor	1990 TF	Melvyn Douglas Taylor (1947–2017), a British amateur astronomer, promotor of amateur astronomy and mentor to many beginners. His legacy includes a large catalog of visual observations of variable stars, meteors and comets.	IAU · 7177
7178 Ikuookamoto	1990 VA_{3}	Ikuo Okamoto (born 1946), optician and amateur astronomer. He owns the Schmidt camera with which this minor planet was discovered	JPL · 7178
7179 Gassendi	1991 GQ_{6}	Pierre Gassendi (1592–1655), French philosopher and scientist	MPC · 7179
7182 Robinvaughan	1991 RV_{1}	Robin M. Vaughan, American engineer, who worked for the Voyager 2, Galileo, Cassini–Huygens and Mars Pathfinder missions and was lead guidance and control system engineer for the MESSENGER spacecraft	JPL · 7182
7186 Tomioka	1991 YF	Hiroyuki Tomioka (born 1942), director of weather information in Hitachi City. An amateur astronomer, he is a charter member of the Nippon Meteor Society and has observed meteors for more than 40 years, both visually and photographically. In addition to his observations from Japan, he often visits the Chiro Observatory Southern Station in Australia to observe southern meteor showers. Name proposed by the discoverers following a suggestion by A. Fujii and T. Sato	JPL · 7186
7187 Isobe	1992 BW	Syuzo Isobe (born 1942), of the National Astronomical Observatory, has been instrumental in establishing the Bisei Spaceguard Center, an observatory designed for the observation of near-earth objects and earth-orbiting space debris. He is also president of the Japan Spaceguard Association	JPL · 7187
7188 Yoshii	1992 SF_{1}	Koichi Yoshii (born 1914), retired postmaster and amateur astronomer. He was a pioneer in meteor photography in Japan. In the 1930s, when the sensitivity of photographic emulsion was still very low, he succeeded in photographing 86 meteors with his homemade camera. Name proposed by the discoverers following a suggestion by A. Fujii, Y. Yabu and T. Sato	JPL · 7188
7189 Kuniko	1992 SX_{12}	Kuniko Fujita (1923–1992), née Sofue, amateur astronomer and poet. She became interested in astronomy at an early age and made an important discovery---a nova, later named CP Pup---when she was a 19-year-old schoolgirl; she was awarded a prize from the Japan Astronomical Society as the first discoverer. She became a member of the Kawasaki Astronomical Club in 1972, and she visited Australia and New Zealand in 1986 to observe comet 1P/Halley. She joined expeditions to the Okinawa annular eclipse in 1986 and to the total eclipse in Mexico in 1991. A talented poet and calligrapher, she published a book of poetry, Hoshinagisa. Named by the discoverer following suggestions by S. Morikubo and T. Minowa	JPL · 7189
7192 Cieletespace	1993 RY_{1}	Ciel et espace (Sky and Space), monthly astronomical magazine edited in Paris by Alain Cirou and published by the Association Française d'Astronomie.	MPC · 7192
7193 Yamaoka	1993 SE_{2}	Hitoshi Yamaoka (born 1965), astrophysicist at Kyushu University who specializes in the study of supernovae and novae. He promotes a supernova search project at public observatories in Japan	JPL · 7193
7194 Susanrose	1993 SR_{3}	Susan Rose (born 1952), of East Meadow, New York, is a tireless promoter of astronomy for families and neophytes. For 20 years she has served as the president of the Amateur Observers' Society of New York. In 2002 she received the Walter Scott Houston Award of the Northeast Region of the Astronomical League	JPL · 7194
7195 Danboice	1994 AJ	Daniel Craig Boice (born 1953), American astronomer and expert in cometary science. He was a member of NASA's Deep Space 1 Mission to comet 19P/Borrelly, codiscoverer of a radio flare on Menkar and recipient of the P. Gott Award. He is strongly committed to international scientific collaboration.	JPL · 7195
7196 Baroni	1994 BF	Sandro Baroni (born 1939), an Italian amateur astronomer. He is an observer of variable stars, comets, and occultations, as well as a member of AAVSO (Src)	MPC · 7196
7197 Pieroangela	1994 BH	Piero Angela (1928–2022), Italian journalist and science writer	MPC · 7197
7198 Montelupo	1994 BJ	The Italian town of Montelupo Fiorentino near Florence, where the Montelupo Observatory (108) is located.	MPC · 7198
7199 Brianza	1994 FR	The Brianza area of Lombardy, and the Gruppo Astrofili Brianza (Brianza Astrophile Group), to which the discoverers belong †	MPC · 7199

== 7201–7300 ==
back to top

Named minor planet	Provisional	This minor planet was named for...	Ref · Catalog
7201 Kuritariku	1994 UF_{1}	Hiroe Kurimoto (born 1961), a Japanese broadcaster with KOFU-FM, whose radio name is Kuritariku, is an active participant in the Star Week program sponsored by the National Astronomical Observatory of Japan	JPL · 7201
7202 Kigoshi	1995 DX_{1}	Kunihiko Kigoshi (1919–2014) was a cosmo-geochemist and emeritus professor at Gakushuin University. One of his pioneering works was the development of the radiocarbon dating method, both theoretically and technically.	JPL · 7202
7203 Sigeki	1995 DG_{2}	Sigeki Horiuchi (born 1949), a factory manager in the town of Shimosuwa, Nagano prefecture.	JPL · 7203
7204 Ondřejov	1995 GH	Ondřejov, Czech Republic, southeast of Prague and where the Ondřejov Observatory, the country's oldest active observatory, is located	MPC · 7204
7205 Sadanori	1995 YE_{1}	Sadanori Okamura (born 1948), president of IAU Commission 28 since 2000	JPL · 7205
7206 Shiki	1996 QT	Masaoka Shiki (1867–1902), a Japanese Haiku poet and author during the Meiji period	MPC · 7206
7207 Hammurabi	2133 P-L	Hammurabi (c. 1810–1750 BCE), King of Babylon	MPC · 7207
7208 Ashurbanipal	2645 P-L	Ashurbanipal (c. 693–626 BCE), King of Assyria	MPC · 7208
7209 Cyrus	3523 P-L	Cyrus II of Persia (c. 600–530 BCE), founder of the Achaemenid Empire	MPC · 7209
7210 Darius	6555 P-L	Darius I of Persia (c. 550–486 BCE) third king of the Achaemenid Empire	MPC · 7210
7211 Xerxes	1240 T-1	Xerxes I of Persia (518–465 BCE) fourth king of the Achaemenid Empire	MPC · 7211
7212 Artaxerxes	2155 T-2	Artaxerxes I of Persia (c. 484–424 BCE) fifth King of Persia	MPC · 7212
7213 Conae	1967 KB	CONAE, Comisión Nacional de Actividades Espaciales (Argentinian "National Committee for Space Activities")	JPL · 7213
7214 Anticlus	1973 SM_{1}	Anticlus, Greek warrior during the Trojan War and one of the Achaeans who hid inside the Trojan Horse.	MPC · 7214
7215 Gerhard	1977 FS	Gerhard Bachmann (1931–1996), head of administration at the organization from 1972 to 1996.	JPL · 7215
7216 Ishkov	1977 QQ_{2}	Vitalij Nikitich Ishkov is a Russian astrophysicist at the Institute of Terrestrial Magnetism, Ionosphere and Radiowave Propagation in Moscow, who works in the fields of solar physics, solar activity and solar-terrestrial relations.	JPL · 7216
7217 Dacke	1979 QX_{3}	Nils Dacke (died 1543), Swedish leader of the medieval peasant revolt known as Dacke War	MPC · 7217
7218 Skácel	1979 SK	Jan Skácel (1922–1989), Czech poet of South Moravian origin, was one of the most beloved Czech poets of the last century. He wrote about human life, love, morals, dreams and nature in poems or just quatrains, as Hope with Wings of Beech shows. Skácel was awarded the German international literary Petrarca-Preis in 1989.	JPL · 7218
7219 Satterwhite	1981 EZ_{47}	Cecilia Satterwhite (born 1958), American curator of meteorites at NASA's Johnson Space Center.	JPL · 7219
7220 Philnicholson	1981 QE	Phil Nicholson (born 1951), a professor of astronomy at Cornell University, an Australian by birth. Nicholson's research centers on the orbital dynamics of planetary ring systems and natural satellites, and infrared observational studies of planets, their satellites and rings. He has also investigated the dynamics of a planetary system around the pulsar PSR B1257+12 and has studied the zodiacal dust bands. Nicholson is co-discoverer of two irregular satellites of Uranus (XVII) and the trans-Neptunian object (385191). He is currently editor of the journal Icarus, which is devoted to planetary science.	JPL · 7220
7221 Sallaba	1981 SJ	Jan Sallaba (1775–1827) was the builder and, from 1821, chief construction manager of the Schwarzenberg court in Cesky Krumlov.	JPL · 7221
7222 Alekperov	1981 TJ_{3}	Vagit Yusupovich Alikperov (born 1950) is known for his development of economical foundations and organizational principles for oil companies. His ideas were used by Lukoil, one of the largest international oil companies. He is also an active sponsor of science and culture in Russia.	JPL · 7222
7223 Dolgorukij	1982 TF_{2}	Yuri Dolgorukiy (c. 1095–1157), son of Vladimir II Monomakh who both reigned as Grand Prince of Kievan Rus	MPC · 7223
7224 Vesnina	1982 TK_{3}	Leonid Vesnin (1880–1933), Viktor Vesnin (1882–1950), and Alexander Vesnin (1883–1959), Russian architects	MPC · 7224
7225 Huntress	1983 BH	Wesley T. Huntress Jr. (born 1942), an American planetary cosmochemist and director of NASA space science programs during the 1990s. Gaining international recognition for pioneering studies of chemical evolution in interstellar clouds, comets and planetary atmospheres, Huntress was instrumental in developing the astrochemical research group at the Jet Propulsion Laboratory. During his six years as NASA Associate Administrator for Space Science, the rate at which science missions were launched increased dramatically, along with the public awareness of space science. The naming honors Huntress on his departure from NASA after an illustrious 29-year career with the agency. Name proposed by the discoverer following a suggestion by M. S. Allen, who prepared the citation.	JPL · 7225
7226 Kryl	1984 QJ	Karel Kryl (1944–1994), Czech singer and songwriter, from 1969 a resident of Germany working at Radio Free Europe. His songs were appreciated as a symbol of freedom by many people in the former Czechoslovakia. Name suggested by J. Ticha and M. Tichy.	JPL · 7226
7228 MacGillivray	1985 GO	Sally M. MacGillivray of Sky Publishing Corporation. With an early bent for music and philosophy, followed by 20 years' experience in book publishing, she brought to the Millennium Star Atlas (1997). As publication manager of this collaborative venture with the European Space Agency's Hipparcos project, she orchestrated the many iterations by two teams of illustrators needed to complete the 1548 charts in the atlas.	JPL · 7228
7229 Tonimoore	1985 RV	Toni L. Moore, who has worked at the University of Arizona's Lunar and Planetary Laboratory since 1986 as an observer, programmer and data analyst on radial velocity observations of stars. She has devoted thousands of hours of observations to a search for planets orbiting other stars, a study of the stability of the solar spectrum and a unique investigation of p -mode oscillations in a star other than the Sun.	JPL · 7229
7230 Lutz	1985 RZ_{1}	Barry L. Lutz (born 1944), professor of physics and astronomy and currently department chair at Northern Arizona University.	JPL · 7230
7231 Porco	1985 TQ_{1}	Carolyn C. Porco (born 1954), an American planetary scientist at the University of Arizona. A pioneer in the study of planetary ring systems, Porco has made important contributions to our knowledge of spokes in Saturn's rings, eccentric ring features in the systems of Saturn and Uranus and the azimuthal structure in the rings of Neptune. Through her contributions to the Voyager project and as the team leader for the Cassini imaging system, Porco has been a leader in spacecraft exploration of the outer solar system. In 1997, she originated the idea of sending a capsule containing ashes of E. M. Shoemaker to the moon aboard the Lunar Prospector spacecraft. Name endorsed by the Shoemaker family.	JPL · 7231
7232 Nabokov	1985 UQ	Vladimir Nabokov (1899–1977) was a Russian-American novelist, poet and critic. His best works, including Lolita (1955), feature stylish, intricate literary effects. The name was suggested by J. Ticha.	JPL · 7232
7233 Majella	1986 EQ_{5}	Majella National Park (Parco Nazionale della Majella) a large and well preserved natural reserve in Abruzzo, Italy	JPL · 7233
7235 Hitsuzan	1986 UY	Hitsuzan, mountain in Kochi, Japan.	JPL · 7235
7237 Vickyhamilton	1988 VH	Victoria Hamilton (born 1971), American planetary mineralogist	JPL · 7237
7238 Kobori	1989 OA	Akira Kobori (1904–1992), professor of mathematics at Kyoto University and president of the Kyoto prefectural university. He contributed to the study of multivalent functions and history of mathematics.	JPL · 7238
7239 Mobberley	1989 TE	Martin Mobberley (born 1958), British amateur astronomer and author †	MPC · 7239
7240 Hasebe	1989 YG	Takao Hasebe (born 1947) is a Japanese amateur astronomer who taught astronomy to the first discoverer during his youth. Hasebe is also an observer of the lunar surface	JPL · 7240
7241 Kuroda	1990 VF_{3}	Takehiko Kuroda (born 1946), since 1990 the first director of the Nishi-Harima Astronomical Observatory (NHAO) and one of the leading astronomers in Japanese public observatories.	JPL · 7241
7242 Okyudo	1990 VG_{3}	Masami Okyudo (born 1961), Japanese astronomer and currently director of the Misato Observatory, Wakayama Prefecture.	JPL · 7242
7244 Villa-Lobos	1991 PQ_{1}	Heitor Villa-Lobos (1887–1959), Brazilian composer	MPC · 7244
7247 Robertstirling	1991 TD_{1}	Robert Stirling (1790–1878), a Scottish inventor.	JPL · 7247
7248 Älvsjö	1992 EV_{21}	Älvsjö, Sweden, now a residential suburb of Stockholm, is the location of the Battle of Brännkyrka (1518), in which the young king-to-be Gustaf Vasa participated. More than a thousand lives were lost, and many streets of Älvsjö bear the names of men killed in the battle.	JPL · 7248
7250 Kinoshita	1992 SG_{1}	Hiroshi Kinoshita (born 1941), a celestial mechanician at the National Astronomical Observatory (formerly known as the Tokyo Astronomical Observatory).	JPL · 7250
7251 Kuwabara	1992 SF_{13}	Syoji Kuwabara (born 1927), a retired school teacher in Japan, he was superintendent of the board of education in Himeji City (1981–1993) and director of the city's Science Museum (1993–1996).	JPL · 7251
7252 Kakegawa	1992 UZ	Kakegawa, an ancient city in central Japan famous for the wooden castle.	JPL · 7252
7253 Nara	1993 CL	The Japanese Nara Prefecture with its capital city of Nara	MPC · 7253
7254 Kuratani	1993 TN_{1}	Hiroshi Kuratani (born 1934), astronomer and educator at Toyama Observatory since 1956	MPC · 7254
7256 Bonhoeffer	1993 VJ_{5}	Dietrich Bonhoeffer (1906–1945), German theologian and opponent of Nazism, executed in 1945 following his arrest and imprisonment after the attempt to assassinate Hitler. His brother Klaus was amongst those arrested and executed.	JPL · 7256
7257 Yoshiya	1994 AH_{1}	Yoshiya Watanabe (born 1968), science educator and planetarian of the Osaka Science Museum	JPL · 7257
7258 Pettarin	1994 EF	Enrico Pettarin (born 1970), Italian amateur astronomer	JPL · 7258
7259 Gaithersburg	1994 EG_{1}	Gaithersburg, Maryland, is a city to the north of Washington, D.C.	JPL · 7259
7260 Metelli	1994 FN	Orneore Metelli (1872–1938), internationally acknowledged as the founder of the school of naïve painting.	JPL · 7260
7261 Yokootakeo	1994 GZ	Takeo Yokoo (born 1939), of Osaka Kyoiku University, mainly studies galactic astronomy. He also served as president of the Society for Teaching and Popularization of Astronomy in Japan from 1998 to 2002.	JPL · 7261
7262 Sofue	1995 BX_{1}	Yoshiaki Sofue (born 1943), works mainly in galactic radio astronomy, playing a leading role in millimeter-wave research of galaxies in Japan. He has determined high-accuracy central rotation curves and detailed mass distributions and has shown the general existence of massive cores.	JPL · 7262
7263 Takayamada	1995 DP	Takashi Yamada (born 1934), a science educator and the former planetarium director of the Nogoya City Science Museum	JPL · 7263
7264 Hirohatanaka	1995 FK	Hiroshi Hatanaka (born 1947), a Japanese amateur astronomer	JPL · 7264
7265 Edithmüller	2908 T-2	Edith Alice Müller (1918–1995), Swiss astronomer. IAU General Secretary from 1976 to 1979.	MPC · 7265
7266 Trefftz	4270 T-2	Eleonore Trefftz (1920–2017), German physicist at the Max Planck Institute for Physics and Astrophysics	MPC · 7266
7267 Victormeen	1943 DF	Victor Ben Meen (1910–1971), Canadian mineralogist and geologist, who was the first to identify the Pingualuit crater in northern Quebec as an impact structure in 1950 †	JPL · 7267
7268 Chigorin	1972 TF	Mikhail Chigorin (1850–1908), founder of the Russian chess school	JPL · 7268
7269 Alprokhorov	1975 VK_{2}	Alexander Prokhorov (1916–2002), Russian physicist and 1964 Nobel laureate for fundamental research in quantum electronics that led to the creation of masers and lasers. He is also honorary director of the A. M. Prokhorov General Physics Institute of the Russian Academy of Sciences.	JPL · 7269
7270 Punkin	1978 NY_{7}	Erica Ann Broman, donor to the Lowell Observatory	MPC · 7270
7271 Doroguntsov	1979 SR_{2}	Sergej Ivanovich Doroguntsov (born 1929), corresponding member of the National Academy of Sciences of Ukraine, is prominent in the study of economics and ecology, head of a faculty at Kiev National Economic University and president of the Ukrainian Ecological Academy of Sciences	JPL · 7271
7272 Darbydyar	1980 DD_{1}	M. Darby Dyar (born 1958), American astronomy professor and planetologist at Mount Holyoke College	JPL · 7272
7273 Garyhuss	1981 EK_{4}	Gary R. Huss (born 1954), American cosmochemist, director of the W. M. Keck Cosmochemistry Laboratory at the University of Hawaii	JPL · 7273
7274 Washioyama	1982 FC	Washioyama, mountain in Kochi, Japan.	JPL · 7274
7275 Earlcarpenter	1983 CY_{2}	Earl Carpenter (born 1934) taught physics to thousands of students over the course of 35 years at Salesianum High School in Wilmington, Delaware where he inspired them to rely on their own problem-solving skills.	JPL · 7275
7276 Maymie	1983 RE	Marion R. Aymie, a manager of the Human Resources Department at the Smithsonian Astrophysical Observatory in Cambridge, Massachusetts	MPC · 7276
7277 Klass	1983 RM_{2}	Philip J. Klass (1919–2005), prominent UFO skeptic [Skeptical Inquirer, Vol. 29, No. 6, Nov/Dec 2005, p. 18]	MPC · 7277
7278 Shtokolov	1985 UW_{4}	Boris Shtokolov (1930–2005), is a Russian singer, actor and bass soloist for the Mariinskij Theatre in St Petersburg	JPL · 7278
7279 Hagfors	1985 VD_{1}	Tor Hagfors (born 1930), in celebration of his 68th birthday and his retirement as director of the Max-Planck-Institut für Aeronomie.	JPL · 7279
7280 Bergengruen	1988 RA_{3}	Werner Bergengruen (1892–1964), a Baltic German novelist and poet	MPC · 7280
7285 Seggewiss	1990 EX_{2}	Wilhelm Seggewiss (born 1937), German astronomer and head of the Hoher List Observatory	MPC · 7285
7287 Yokokurayama	1990 VN_{2}	Yokokurayama, mountain in Kochi, Japan.	JPL · 7287
7289 Kamegamori	1991 JU	Kamegamori, a grassy mountain in the center of the mountainous region of Shikoku Island.	JPL · 7289
7290 Johnrather	1991 JY_{1}	John Daniel Gray Rather (born 1938), American astrophysicist and head of the Near-Earth Object Interception Committee	MPC · 7290
7291 Hyakutake	1991 XC_{1}	Yuji Hyakutake (1950–2002), Japanese astronomer and discoverer of comet Hyakutake	MPC · 7291
7292 Prosperin	1992 EM_{7}	Erik Prosperin (1739–1803), Swedish astronomer	MPC · 7292
7293 Kazuyuki	1992 FH	Kazuyuki Saitoh (born 1957), associate director of the Nichihara Observatory since 1985 and president of the Shimane Society of Astronomy, Shimane Prefecture.	JPL · 7293
7294 Barbaraakey	1992 LM	Barbara Ann (Akey) Leonard (born 1968), wife of American discoverer Gregory J. Leonard	JPL · 7294
7295 Brozovic	1992 MB	Marina Brozovic (born 1971), an American scientist at JPL, uses the Goldstone and Arecibo radars to observe near-earth objects and then derives radar shape models and rotation states for these objects	JPL · 7295
7296 Lamarck	1992 PW_{1}	Jean-Baptiste Lamarck (1744–1829), French naturalist	MPC · 7296
7298 Matudaira-gou	1992 WM_{5}	Matudaira-gou is located in the east of Toyota city, Aichi prefecture. It is the motherland of the Tokugawa Shōgun family, who ruled Japan during 1603–1867	JPL · 7298
7299 Indiawadkins	1992 WZ_{5}	India Wadkins (1947–1999), long-time secretary to the Planetary Society †	MPC · 7299
7300 Yoshisada	1992 YV_{2}	Yoshisada Shimizu (born 1943), a Japanese amateur astronomer, astrophotographer, and discoverer of minor planets	MPC · 7300

== 7301–7400 ==
back to top

Named minor planet	Provisional	This minor planet was named for...	Ref · Catalog
7301 Matsuitakafumi	1993 AB	Takafumi Matsui (1946-2023) was Director of the Planetary Exploration Research Center at the Chiba Institute of Technology, and Emeritus Professor at the University of Tokyo. He was specialized in astrobiology and comparative planetology, and the study of meteoroid impacts on the evolution of the Earth and life	JPL · 7301
7304 Namiki	1994 AE_{2}	Namiki Mitsuo (born 1957) is a Japanese amateur astronomer on the staff of the public-information office of the National Astronomical Observatory. He acts as a bridge between Japanese professionals and amateurs and helps create friendly relationships	JPL · 7304
7305 Ossakajusto	1994 CX_{1}	Justo Ossaka (1922–1998), emeritus director of the Sendai Astronomical Observatory. Graduating from the Geophysical Institute, Tohoku University, in 1950, he worked at the Sendai Observatory from 1956 to 1994. He contributed greatly to attracting amateur astronomers and planetarium visitors. Name proposed by A. Watanabe and M. Koishikawa of the Sendai Astronomical Observatory	JPL · 7305
7306 Panizon	1994 EH	Franco Panizon (born 1925). Head of the pediatric department of the University of Trieste, he is one of the key figures in Italian pediatrics, endowed with a deep knowledge of all scientific disciplines focusing on human beings, a true master of science and life. From Trieste he has influenced pediatricians all over the country and has founded a pediatric school that teaches care for children through mind and heart	JPL · 7306
7307 Takei	1994 EH	George Takei (born 1937), an actor best known for his role as Mr. Sulu in the original Star Trek television series. He also has a lengthy record of public service through his involvement with organizations such as the Japanese American Citizens League and the Human Rights Campaign.	JPL · 7307
7308 Hattori	1995 BQ_{4}	Tadahiko Hattori (1908–1962), a Japanese astronomer at the Tokyo Astronomical Observatory and International Latitude Observatory who became the first director of the International Polar Motion Service shortly before his death.	MPC · 7308
7309 Shinkawakami	1995 FU	Shin-ichi Kawakami (born 1956) is a professor of Earth and Planetary Sciences in the Faculty of Education at Gifu University. He has studied impact cratering and its implications for planetary evolution. He also published several books on the history of Planet Earth	JPL · 7309
7311 Hildehan	1995 TU	Forever outnumbered by the women in his life, the discoverer chose to acknowledge those most significant with an appellation formed by letters in the names of his mother, Edith (Johnson) di Cicco (1912–1994); wife, Hilary F. Bennett (born 1952); and daughter, Hannah di Cicco (born 1987)	JPL · 7311
7313 Pisano	6207 P-L	Family of Italian sculptors: Nicola Pisano (c. 1225–1280), Giovanni Pisano (c. 1250–1315), and Andrea Pisano (c. 1290–1348)	MPC · 7313
7314 Pevsner	2146 T-1	Antoine Pevsner (1886–1962), Russian-born French sculptor and painter.	MPC · 7314
7315 Kolbe	1136 T-2	Georg Kolbe (1877–1947), a German sculptor	MPC · 7315
7316 Hajdú	3145 T-2	Étienne Hajdú (1907–1996), Hungarian-born French sculptor	MPC · 7316
7317 Cabot	1940 ED	John Cabot (c. 1450–1500), an Italian (Genoese-Venetian) navigator and explorer.	MPC · 7317
7318 Dyukov	1969 OX	Vitalij Petrovich Dyukov (born 1945), a professor at the Siberian State Geodesy Academy in Novosibirsk, is a specialist on the earth's gravitational field and author of more than ten textbooks for students	JPL · 7318
7319 Katterfeld	1976 SA_{6}	Gennadij Nikolaevich Katterfeld (born 1927), a Russian geologist and planetologist in Saint Petersburg.	MPC · 7319
7320 Potter	1978 TP_{6}	Kheino Potter (1929–2007), astronomer at Pulkovo Observatory, known for his work on the determination of astronomical constants and the problems of selenodesy. He was initiator of and an active contributor to FOCAT, the reference catalog for the southern sky, and he organized the observational station at Ordubad.	JPL · 7320
7321 Minervahoyt	1979 MZ_{2}	Minerva Hamilton Hoyt (1866–1945) was an American activist. She advocated for desert regions and plants, educating people across the nation. Thanks to her efforts, California created Joshua Tree, Death Valley, and Anza-Borrego Desert parks. Over 2.5 million people now visit the Joshua Tree park each year.	JPL · 7321
7322 Lavrentina	1979 SW_{2}	Soviet mathematician Mikhail Alekseevich Lavrent'ev (1900–1980) was the first head of the Siberian Department of the U.S.S.R. Academy of Sciences. His son Mikhail Mikhailovich Lavrent'ev (born 1932) also works in mathematical physics	JPL · 7322
7323 Robersomma	1979 SD_{9}	Roberto Somma (born 1944), an Italian space engineer at Alenia Spazio, has promoted ideas and organized international meetings in Italy on the exploration of the Solar System, in particular of near-Earth objects	JPL · 7323
7324 Carret	1981 BC	Philip L. Carret (1896–1998), American investor and creator of the Pioneer Fund	MPC · 7324
7326 Tedbunch	1981 UK_{22}	Theodore E. Bunch (born 1936) is an American meteoriticist at Northern Arizona University. He has used petrologic studies of a broad array of meteorites to understand the metamorphism and differentiation of minor planets and the Moon.	JPL · 7326
7327 Crawford	1983 RZ_{1}	David L. Crawford (born 1931), astronomer at the Kitt Peak National Observatory recognized for his fundamental contributions to protecting dark skies around observatories from light pollution through good outdoor lighting practices. In 1972 he was instrumental in establishing the first comprehensive lighting code, which regulated outdoor lighting in southern Arizona, and the code has become a model for such regulation throughout the world. Crawford was cofounder and executive director of the International Dark-Sky Association, a worldwide organization dedicated to the preservation of dark skies. He was also responsible for establishing the fundamental standards of the Strömgren photometric system. Name suggested and citation provided by D. R. Davis	JPL · 7327
7328 Casanova	1984 SC_{1}	Giacomo Casanova (1725–1798) was an Italian writer, spy and diplomat, the prince of Italian adventurers. His autobiography Histoire de ma vie established his reputation as an archetypal seducer of women. He spent his final years in Bohemia as librarian in the château of Dux, now Duchcov. The name was suggested by M. Tichy.	JPL · 7328
7329 Bettadotto	1985 GK	Elisabetta Dotto (born 1965), Italian planetary scientist. Dotto studied the rotational properties of a large number of minor planets by carrying out accurate photometric observations. She assisted the Galileo mission fly-by of (243) Ida by determining the spin vector and a reference shape using ground-based observations, and she contributed to the ISO mission by interpreting infrared observations. Name suggested and citation prepared by M. A. Barucci and M. Fulchignoni.	JPL · 7329
7330 Annelemaître	1985 TD	Anne Lemaître (born 1957) a Belgian mathematician, for her pioneering analytic studies of the dynamics of minor planets in mean-motion resonances. She has also investigated the process of adiabatic capture into resonance, and has computed accurate proper elements for objects with large orbital eccentricities and inclinations. Name suggested and citation provided by A. Morbidelli.	JPL · 7330
7331 Balindblad	1985 TV	Bertil Lindblad (born 1921), Swedish astronomer of the Lund Observatory, in recognition of his lifetime work on meteor orbits; his long-term effort in establishing a database for all meteor orbits, now generally used by all meteor workers; his stewardship of IAU Commission 22, which he served as president in the early 1970s; and, in particular, his contribution to starting the very successful "Asteroids, Comets, Meteors" series of conferences. Name suggested and citation written by I. P. Williams.	JPL · 7331
7332 Ponrepo	1986 XJ_{5}	Viktor Ponrepo (1858–1926), a Czech cinematic pioneer who was the founder of the first permanent cinema in Prague in 1907. The name was suggested by M. Tichy.	JPL · 7332
7333 Bec-Borsenberger	1987 SM_{4}	Annick Bec-Borsenberger (born 1940), a French astronomer at the Bureau des Longitudes, Institut de Mécanique Céleste de l'Observatoire de Paris. She is known for her analytical theory of the motion of the Moon. She is an expert in the dynamics of small bodies, particularly in the convergence of algorithms used to determine perturbed orbits. She helped analyze Hipparcos data on minor planets and satellites and has been involved in the ISO mission. Citation provided by M. A. Barucci.	JPL · 7333
7334 Sciurus	1988 QV	Sciurus, a genus of bushy-tailed squirrels. Sciurus vulgaris and Sciurus carolinensis are squirrels, animals that live mainly in the tops of trees in parks and forests around many observatories, including Klet and the České Budějovice Observatory. The name was suggested by J. Ticha.	JPL · 7334
7336 Saunders	1989 RS_{1}	R. Stephen Saunders (born 1940), chief scientist for the Solar System Exploration Office at the Jet Propulsion Laboratory, is the project scientist for the Mars Surveyor Program 2001/2003 mission, director of JPL's Regional Planetary Image Facility and former project scientist of the Magellan mission to Venus	JPL · 7336
7342 Uchinoura	1992 FB_{1}	Uchinoura, a former Japanese town located in the Kimotsuki District of Kagoshima Prefecture, where the Kagoshima Space Center of the Institute of Space and Astronautical Science (ISAS) is located. A small fishing village, the town entered the limelight in 1962, when it was selected as the launching site for ISAS (now ISAS Ministry of Education, Science, Sports and Culture). ISAS satellites are launched toward the Pacific Ocean from a plateau in the southeastern part of the town. The facilities are getting larger as the rockets also grow in size. The usual population of the town is about 10,000, but at the time of a launch staff and reporters typically cause a 20-percent increase.	JPL · 7342
7343 Ockeghem	1992 GE_{2}	Johannes Ockeghem (1420–1497), a Flemish composer	MPC · 7343
7344 Summerfield	1992 LU	Robert and Lisa Summerfield, American popularizers of astronomy and found of the "Astronomy To Go" organization	MPC · 7344
7345 Happer	1992 OF	Felix Happer, the character played by Burt Lancaster in the movie Local Hero	MPC · 7345
7346 Boulanger	1993 DQ_{2}	Nicolas Antoine Boulanger (1722–1759), a French geologist and one of the Encyclopedists, believed that the irrational behavior of the human species, together with all the heritage of religious rites and much of the political of his own and other ages, were engendered in cataclysmic experiences.	JPL · 7346
7349 Ernestmaes	1993 QK_{4}	Ernest Maes (born 1915), a doctor of medicine (dermatology), has long had a great interest in anthropology, history of religion and psychiatry, resulting in several books on the critical evaluation of religious tradition	JPL · 7349
7351 Yoshidamichi	1993 XB_{1}	Michitoshi Yoshida (born 1963) is the director of Okayama Astrophysical Observatory, a branch of the National Astronomical Observatory of Japan. His main interests are extragalactic astronomy, especially observational study of active galaxies, and astronomical instrumentation	JPL · 7351
7352 Hypsenor	1994 CO	Hypsenor, son of Hippasus from Greek mythology. During the Trojan War, Deiphobus attempted to strike Idomeneus after latter killed Asius, but his spear throw bounced off Idomeneus' shield and killed Hypsenor instead.	IAU · 7352
7353 Kazuya	1995 AC_{1}	Kazuya Yoshida (born 1960). An authority in robot engineering at Tohoku University, Yoshida is now developing a robotic system to explore the minor planets. He is an excellent astrophotographer and a member of Mt. Nyukasa Station, where this minor planet was discovered	JPL · 7353
7354 Ishiguro	1995 BR_{1}	Masato Ishiguro (born 1945) has been the Japanese project director of the ALMA (Atacama Large Millimeter/submillimeter Array) project since 1998. He was in charge of constructing the Nobeyama Millimeter Array and was the director of the Nobeyama Radio Observatory from 1990 to 1996.	JPL · 7354
7355 Bottke	1995 HN_{2}	William F. Bottke Jr. (born 1966), a planetary scientist known for his research on the collisional and dynamical evolution of minor planets. He has also contributed to the study of the origin and evolution of NEAs, in particular by analyzing the formation of doublet craters found on the terrestrial planets.	JPL · 7355
7356 Casagrande	1995 SK_{5}	Alessandro Casagrande (1922–1964). Composer and orchestra conductor, he skillfully headed the music school in Terni and served as artistic manager of the city's symphonic bureau "S. Falchi". He was also a painter. In 1965 an international piano competition was named for him	JPL · 7356
7358 Oze	1995 YA_{3}	Oze is a basin highland lying astride the prefectures Fukushima, Gunma and Niigata. The highland is surrounded by mountains, including Mt. Hiuchidake and Mt. Shifutsu, making up the western part of the Nikkō National Park	JPL · 7358
7359 Messier	1996 BH	Charles Messier (1730–1817), French astronomer best known for his Messier objects	MPC · 7359
7360 Moberg	1996 BQ_{17}	Vilhelm Moberg (1898–1973), a Swedish novelist and writer. Moberg mainly wrote about society's lower classes and always fought for the individual against the authorities. He also strove unsuccessfully to make Sweden a republic. Among his best-known novels are Utvandrarna ("The Emigrants") and Invandrarna ("The Immigrants"), about a family moving from Småland to Minnesota during the nineteenth century.	JPL · 7360
7361 Endres	1996 DN_{1}	Michael Hart Endres, American site manager of the GEODSS project and involved in the setup of the Near-Earth Asteroid Tracking program	MPC · 7361
7362 Rogerbyrd	1996 EY	Roger Byrd, experienced U.S. project manager involved in the GEODSS and NEAT programs	MPC · 7362
7363 Esquibel	1996 FA_{1}	Albert Esquibel, experienced U.S. project manager involved in the GEODSS and NEAT programs	MPC · 7363
7364 Otonkučera	1996 KS	Oton Kučera, founder of Zagreb Observatory, Croatia	MPC · 7364
7365 Sejong	1996 QV_{1}	King Sejong (1397–1450) was the fourth Korean king of Joseon-dynasty, who built the Royal Observatory of Choson	MPC · 7365
7366 Agata	1996 UY	Hidehiko Agata (born 1961) is a staff member in the public information office of the National Astronomical Observatory of Japan. His main interests are education and populiarization of astronomy, and he has published many books on elementary astronomy. He has also studied cometary plasma tails	JPL · 7366
7367 Giotto	3077 T-1	Giotto di Bondone (c. 1266–1337), Italian painter and architect	MPC · 7367
7368 Haldancohn	1966 BB	Haldan Cohn (born 1953), on the faculty of Indiana University, has carried out fundamental research on the dynamics of stellar systems. He is particularly known for his work on the late stages of core collapse in star clusters and on the effect of gravothermal instabilities on the dynamical evolution of star clusters	JPL · 7368
7369 Gavrilin	1975 AN	Valery Gavrilin (1939–1999) was an outstanding Russian composer whose compositions have become a national property of Russia and occupy a well-deserved place in the culture of the twentieth century. The name was suggested by the Union of Concert Workers of Russia.	JPL · 7369
7370 Krasnogolovets	1978 SM_{5}	Mikhail Aleksandrovich Krasnogolovets (born 1960), professor of radioelectronics at Kharkov National Technical University, specializes in the physics of elementary particles, accelerators and lasers. He is known in particular for his work on a high-energy laser for astrophysical research	JPL · 7370
7371 El-Baz	1978 VA_{6}	Farouk El-Baz (born 1938) is an Egyptian American remote sensing expert. He is perhaps best known for using his expertise to help select the landing site for the Apollo 11 astronauts. He also trained the Apollo 15 astronauts in geology, ensuring that the most scientifically useful samples were gathered for return to Earth.	JPL · 7371
7372 Emimar	1979 HH	Geophysicist María Emilia Muzzio (born 1979) and anthropologist Marina Muzzio (born 1982) are two Argentine scientists, daughters of the discoverer	JPL · 7372
7373 Stashis	1979 QX_{9}	Vladimir Vladimirovich Stashis (born 1925) is a Ukrainian scholar of jurisprudence, vice-rector of the Ukrainian National Academy of Law and a member of the International Court of the United Nations. He also likes poetry and art and has a large collection of pictures of classical Russian painters	JPL · 7373
7376 Jefftaylor	1980 UU_{1}	G. Jeffrey Taylor (born 1944) is an American professor of planetary science at the University of Hawaii. His merging of data on lunar and meteorite petrology with remotely-sensed data from planetary missions has unlocked vital clues to the earliest evolution of planetary bodies, particularly the moon.	JPL · 7376
7377 Pizzarello	1981 EW_{9}	Sandra Pizzarello (born 1933), an Italian chemist and professor of chemistry at Arizona State University. Along with colleagues, she has pioneered the study of organic material in meteorites.	JPL · 7377
7378 Herbertpalme	1981 EK_{18}	Herbert Palme (born 1943) a German geochemist and professor at the Institute of Mineralogy and Geochemistry, University of Cologne. He is a geochemist interested in all aspects of meteoritics and planetary science, with an emphasis on understanding the origin of components in chondritic meteorites.	JPL · 7378
7379 Naoyaimae	1981 EC_{29}	Naoya Imae (born 1964) is a curator at the National Institute of Polar Research in Tokyo, whose petrologic studies of carbonaceous chondrites and martian meteorites have focused on understanding the processes of aqueous alteration on minor planets and igneous differentiation on Mars.	JPL · 7379
7381 Mamontov	1981 RG_{5}	Savva Mamontov (1841–1918), Russian patron of the arts	MPC · 7381
7382 Bozhenkova	1981 RJ_{5}	Margarita Ivanovna Bozhenkova (born 1941), a Russian writer and member of the Writers' Union of Russia, vice-president of the Writers' Naval Association in St. Petersburg and laureate of the "Gold Pen" prize	JPL · 7382
7383 Lassovszky	1981 SE	Károly Lassovszky (1897–1961), Hungarian astronomer (Src Src)	MPC · 7383
7385 Aktsynovia	1981 UQ_{11}	Lyudmila Mikhailovna Aktsynova (1910–1997) and her husband Arkadij Vsevolodovich Aktsynov (1910–1997) were masters of portraiture and landscape painting. They depicted the beauties of nature in various parts of Russia, including Siberia, Baikal, Sayany, Altaj and Volga	JPL · 7385
7386 Paulpellas	1981 WM	Paul Pellas (1924–1997), French meteoriticist and curator at the Muséum d'Histoire Naturelle in Paris	MPC · 7386
7387 Malbil	1982 BS_{1}	Malcolm Bilson (born 1935), an American pianist and Professor of Music at Cornell University who has recorded scintillating performances of music by Mozart, Beethoven and others. His research interests center on music of the late eigteenth and nineteenth centuries, performance practice, problems of notation and execution, instruments and musical aesthetics. He has won several awards. Bilson gave a recital at the "Asteroids, Comets, Meteors" meeting at Cornell University in July 1999., American pianist	MPC · 7387
7388 Marcomorelli	1982 FS_{3}	Marco Morelli (born 1973), a planetary geologist and a specialist in terrestrial impact structures and meteorites.	JPL · 7388
7389 Michelcombes	1982 UE	Michel André Combes (born 1939), French planetary scientist and president of the Paris Observatory from 1992 to 1998. Combes studied planetary atmospheres using infrared observations carried out both from the ground and from space. He has been particularly active in designing and building new-technology instruments for spacecraft (for example, an infrared spectrometer for the Vega mission to comet 1P/Halley) and for the largest ground-based telescopes (such as the adaptive optics device Come-on). Combes has played an important role in developing planetary science in France, particularly by encouraging his younger colleagues to join international efforts in planetary space exploration. Name suggested and citation prepared by M. Fulchignoni.	JPL · 7389
7390 Kundera	1983 QE	Milan Kundera (1929–2023), Czech novelist, playwright and poet. He has written various works combining the comedy of living with political criticism. His novel The Unbearable Lightness of Being is well known and received wide international exposure as a very successful movie. Since 1975 he has lived in France. Name proposed by J. Ticha following a suggestion by M. Šidlichovský.	JPL · 7390
7391 Strouhal	1983 VS_{1}	Vincenc Strouhal (1850–1922), Czech physicist and professor of experimental physics. He founded and built up the Institute of Physics of the Czech part of Charles University (1907). Name suggested by J. Ticha and M. Šolc.	JPL · 7391
7392 Kowalski	1984 EX	Richard Kowalski (born 1963), an American amateur astronomer and discoverer of minor planets of Quail Hollow Observatory, near Tampa, Florida. Kowalski is engaged in follow-up and discovery work on minor planets and comets. In 1998 he founded and has energetically maintained the Minor Planet Mailing List, a web-based information service and chat group for amateur and professional observers. Kowalski has also been the main organizer of the 1999 Amateur-Professional Minor Planet Workshop at the Lowell Observatory. Citation written by the discoverer and P. G. Comba.	JPL · 7392
7393 Luginbuhl	1984 SL_{3}	Christian B. Luginbuhl (born 1955), American astronomer and discoverer of minor planets of the U.S. Naval Observatory's Flagstaff Station, is largely responsible for the enactment and continued enforcement of ordinances preserving the dark skies of northern Arizona. With the discoverer, he co-authored the Observing Handbook and Catalogue of Deep-Sky Objects.	JPL · 7393
7394 Xanthomalitia	1985 QX_{4}	Leonid Vasil'evich Xanthomaliti (Ksanfomaliti; born 1932), radiometrist, photo-metrist, polarimetrist and altimetrist, discovered the Martian "anti-greenhouse" effect, hypothesized on the thunderbolt phenomena in Venus' atmosphere and predicted high volcanic activity on Venus. The name was suggested by V. K. Abalakin	JPL · 7394
7396 Rosa-Brusin	1986 EQ_{2}	Silvia Rosa-Brusin, head of one of the principal Italian scientific programs. She is strongly involved in popular astronomy and is in close contact with scientists around the world. Her programs on Italian television constitute a serious reference for interested people	JPL · 7396
7398 Walsh	1986 VM	Martin F. Walsh, friend of the discoverer	MPC · 7398
7399 Somme	1987 BC_{2}	The Somme is a river in Northern France in the département of Picardie. The Celtic name means 'tranquility'. With a length of nearly 250 km and a source near the city of St. Quentin, the Somme forms an extensive and beautiful bay, rich in flora and fauna, as it enters the English Channel	JPL · 7399
7400 Lenau	1987 QW_{1}	Nikolaus Lenau (1802–1850), an Austrian poet, whose Faust was the inspiration of Liszt's Mephisto Walzer	JPL · 7400

== 7401–7500 ==
back to top

Named minor planet	Provisional	This minor planet was named for...	Ref · Catalog
7401 Toynbee	1987 QW_{7}	Arnold J. Toynbee (1889–1975), a British historian, who analyzed the rise and fall of civilizations in his twelve-volume work A Study of History (1934–1961)	JPL · 7401
7403 Choustník	1988 AV_{1}	Choustník, castle in Czech Republic	MPC · 7403
7408 Yoshihide	1989 SB	Yoshihide Hayashi (born 1959), a Japanese amateur astronomer who works as a curator at a science museum. He contributes himself as a volunteer to the educational organization Fukorounokai and serves to popularize astronomy among the citizens.	JPL · 7408
7410 Kawazoe	1990 QG	Akira Kawazoe (born 1934), a member of the Geisei Observatory staff with particular interests in meteorites and geology.	JPL · 7410
7412 Linnaeus	1990 SL_{9}	Carl Linnaeus (Carl von Linné; 1707–1778), Swedish naturalist	MPC · 7412
7413 Galibina	1990 SH_{28}	Irina Vladimirovna Galibina (born 1929), a celestial mechanician.	JPL · 7413
7414 Bosch	1990 TD_{8}	Carl Bosch (1874–1940), a German chemist, inventor of high-pressure ammonia synthesis, 1931 Nobel laureate in chemistry and enthusiastic amateur astronomer. During the 1920s he built a well-equipped private observatory on his estate at Heidelberg, where he carried out spectroscopic and photometric studies. He was an important patron of science, supporting especially the Heidelberg-Königstuhl Observatory, the Astronomische Gesellschaft and the Einstein Foundation. Name proposed by the first discoverer, endorsed by G. Klare and H. Mandel.	JPL · 7414
7415 Susumuimoto	1990 VL_{8}	Susumu Imoto (1901–1981) studied the history of astronomy and old Japanese calendars. With I. Hasegawa, he compiled a catalogue of meteor showers and lent support to the world calendar proposed by E. Achelis.	JPL · 7415
7416 Linnankoski	1990 WV_{4}	Johannes Linnankoski (Vihtori Peltonen, 1869–1913) was a Finnish writer who promoted Finnish independence from Russia. He is known for his novel, The Song of the Blood-Red Flower (1905). In 1960 the discoverer, Eric Elst, set much of this novel to music.	MPC · 7416
7418 Akasegawa	1991 EJ_{1}	Genpei Akasegawa (born 1937), a famous novelist in Japan.	JPL · 7418
7420 Buffon	1991 RP_{11}	Georges-Louis Leclerc, Comte de Buffon (1707–1788) was a French naturalist, mathematician, cosmologist, and encyclopédiste.	MPC · 7420
7421 Kusaka	1992 HL	Hideaki Kusaka (1924–1991), an amateur astronomer.	JPL · 7421
7425 Lessing	1992 RO_{5}	Gotthold Ephraim Lessing (1729–1781) was a German writer, philosopher, and dramatist.	MPC · 7425
7428 Abekuniomi	1992 YM	Abe Kuniomi (born 1941) is an expert photographer of the Moon's surface and planets.	JPL · 7428
7429 Hoshikawa	1992 YB_{1}	Hoshikawa, or Star River, flows between Kumagaya and Gyoda, in Saitama prefecture.	JPL · 7429
7430 Kogure	1993 BV_{2}	Tomokazu Kogure (born 1925), professor emeritus of Kyoto University.	JPL · 7430
7431 Jettaguilar	1993 FN_{41}	Jose A. "Jett" Aguilar (born 1961) is a Filipino neurosurgeon who has saved over one thousand children in the Philippines by volunteering his time and surgical expertise to treat their congenital malformations and brain tumors. He is also an amateur astronomer and serves as vice president of the Astronomical League of the Philippines.	IAU · 7431
7433 Pellegrini	1993 KD	Guglielmo Pellegrini (1937–1990), an Italian amateur astronomer	MPC · 7433
7434 Osaka	1994 AB_{3}	Osaka, the second largest city in Japan, administrative center of the prefecture, and an important industrial, cultural, business and scientific center.	JPL · 7434
7435 Sagamihara	1994 CZ_{1}	Sagamihara, a city located some 50 km west for Tokyo.	JPL · 7435
7436 Kuroiwa	1994 CB_{2}	Goro Kuroiwa (1912–1990), Japanese astronomer and observer of variable stars. A student in the department of astronomy at the University of Tokyo on the occasion of the total solar eclipse on 1936 June 19, he independently discovered the nova CP Lac, along with Kazuaki Gomi. While serving with the Japanese army in 1942 he independently discovered the nova CP Pup. He represented Japan in the geodetic survey program using photoelectric observations of lunar occultations, carried out from 1950 to the 1960s by the U.S. Army Map Service Far East.	JPL · 7436
7437 Torricelli	1994 EF_{3}	Evangelista Torricelli (1608–1647), an Italian mathematician and physicist	MPC · 7437
7438 Misakatouge	1994 JE_{1}	Misakatouge, a steep and foggy Japanese mountain pass at 720 meters altitude, located near the discovering Kuma Kogen Astronomical Observatory	MPC · 7438
7439 Tetsufuse	1994 XG_{1}	Tetsuharu Fuse (born 1970) works at the Subaru Telescope, National Astronomical Observatory of Japan. A solar system researcher, interested in the Edgeworth-Kuiper belt objects and natural satellites, he is also the first public relations coordinator at the Subaru Telescope.	JPL · 7439
7440 Závist	1995 EA	Závist (Oppidum Závist), a Czech archaeological site of a Celtic town	MPC · 7440
7441 Láska	1995 OZ	Václav Láska (mathematician) (1862–1943), Czech geophysicist, astronomer, geodetist, and mathematician	MPC · 7441
7442 Inouehideo	1995 SC_{5}	Hideo Inoue (1917–) was a Japanese astronomer. An astronomy enthusiast while still a child, he studied at the Tokyo College of Physics and at the Institute of Cosmical Physics in Kyoto. While participating in Kyoto University's expedition to the total solar eclipse on 1941 Sept. 21 he obtained color photographs of the solar corona, the first in Japan. He later worked at the Peking Observatory, where he calculated the national ephemeris. After the war he taught at technical high schools in Japan. For the International Geophysical Year he led the Higasimatuyama Moonwatch Team. He is also an enthusiastic ham radio operator.	JPL · 7442
7443 Tsumura	1996 BR_{2}	Mitsunori Tsumura (born 1955), a science educator at the Wakayama Science Museum.	JPL · 7443
7445 Trajanus	4116 P-L	Trajan (53–117), Roman Emperor	MPC · 7445
7446 Hadrianus	2249 T-2	Hadrian (76–138), Roman Emperor	MPC · 7446
7447 Marcusaurelius	1142 T-3	Marcus Aurelius (121–180), Roman Emperor	MPC · 7447
7448 Pöllath	1948 AA	Reinhard Pöllath (born 1948), a professor of tax law at the University of Münster, is an authority on corporate acquisitions and business successions. As founder of the Exzellenz-Stiftung zur Förderung der Max-Planck-Gesellschaft he inspires the community with his fascination for science, in particular for molecular biology	JPL · 7448
7449 Döllen	1949 QL	Johann Heinrich Wilhelm Döllen (1820–1897), a German astronomer at the Dorpat Observatory, was an assistant of W. Struve. Later he worked on geodetic problems at the Pulkovo Observatory. Döllen is notable for his discussion on errors of heliometer observations. The name was suggested by L. D. Schmadel (Src).	JPL · 7449
7450 Shilling	1968 OZ	Pavel Schilling (1786–1837) was a Russian inventor and orientalist. In 1832 he became the first to invent an electromagnetic telegraph suitable for practical use. He investigated the history and languages of Asian peoples and gathered a large collection of oriental manuscripts.	JPL · 7450
7451 Verbitskaya	1978 PU_{2}	Lyudmila Alekseevna Verbitskaya (1936–2019), a professor of general linguistics, is an authority on Russian and experimental phonetics. As rector of St. Petersburg University she has created and supported favorable conditions for the development of higher education and science. The name was suggested by K. V. Kholshevnikov.	JPL · 7451
7452 Izabelyuria	1978 QU_{2}	Izabella Yurieva (1900–2000) was a Russian singer and performer of lyric songs and romances.	JPL · 7452
7453 Slovtsov	1978 RV_{1}	Petr Andreevich Slovtsov (1767–1843), historiographer of Siberia and founder of regional studies of Siberia	JPL · 7453
7454 Kevinrighter	1981 EW_{20}	Kevin Righter (born 1965) is an American curator of Antarctic meteorites at NASA's Johnson Space Center. His research focuses on the chemical processes occurring during early planetary differentiation.	JPL · 7454
7455 Podosek	1981 EQ_{26}	Frank A. Podosek (born 1941) is an American professor at Washington University in St. Louis. His research centers on the uses of isotopic analysis of natural materials in elucidating the character and history of our planet and our planetary system.	JPL · 7455
7456 Doressoundiram	1982 OD	Alain Doressoundiram (born 1968), French planetary scientist. He has worked on the collisional evolution of the population of minor planets, in particular the formation and evolution of binary systems during a family-forming collision. He has contributed to the spectroscopic characterization of a number of minor planet families and helped plan the Rosetta and DS4-Champollion space missions. Name suggested and citation prepared by M. A. Barucci and M. Fulchignoni.	JPL · 7456
7457 Veselov	1982 SL_{6}	Vyacheslav Afanasievich Veselov (born 1930), a Russian space scientist and consultant on the automatic Lunokhods, made the small-site photolocation systems for driving the Mars Rover and planet rovers. He directed the performance of the astrophysical devices aboard the Mir station for research on the fine structure of the Earth's atmosphere.	JPL · 7457
7459 Gilbertofranco	1984 HR_{1}	Gilberto Franco (born 1952), a medical doctor at San Damiano, Asti, is a very good friend of the discoverer and an enthusiastic amateur astronomer	JPL · 7459
7460 Julienicoles	1984 JN	Julie Laine Nicoles (born 1986) has worked as a life guard, as a caregiver for her grandmother, and for several years at the Sylvan Learning Center and the Jasper Elementary school in Rancho Cucamonga, California. She is now a student at Chaffey College nearby	JPL · 7460
7461 Kachmokiam	1984 TD	Katherine Galindo, Christine Galindo, Molly Thompson, Kimberly Galindo and Amy Galindo, nieces of Donna Thompson, administrator for the Minor Planet Center	MPC · 7461
7462 Grenoble	1984 WM_{1}	Grenoble, France, the French city, located in the foothills of the western Alps	JPL · 7462
7463 Oukawamine	1985 SB	Oukawamine, a high plateau at the boundary of Kochi and Ehime prefectures	JPL · 7463
7464 Vipera	1987 VB_{1}	The viper) family of snakes, and more particularly Vipera berus, the adder or northern viper, which inhabits Kleť mountain	MPC · 7464
7465 Munkanber	1989 UA_{3}	John Munger, Veikko Kanto and Richard Berry, the authors of The CCD Cookbook. By providing detailed instructions and software, they have made it possible for the amateur astronomer to construct and operate an efficient, low-cost CCD camera. The final imaging and astrometry of this minor planet was carried out with such a camera made by the discoverer.	JPL · 7465
7468 Anfimov	1990 UP_{11}	Nikolaj Apollonovich Anfimov (born 1935), a Russian space scientist and co-chairman of the Russian-American cosmic committee, is a well-known scientist in space technology and the theory of heat-mass exchange. He received an award from NASA and is an officer of the French Légion d'honneur.	JPL · 7468
7469 Krikalev	1990 VU_{14}	Sergei Krikalev (born 1958), a Russian cosmonaut who worked aboard the space missions Discovery and Endeavor and was commander of the crews of Mir and the International Space Station. He spent 803 days in space during six flights. He was awarded a special medal by NASA.	JPL · 7469
7470 Jabberwock	1991 JA	The Jabberwock is a mythical creature that is the subject of the classic nonsense poem Jabberwocky in Lewis Carroll's delightful tale Through the Looking Glass and what Alice found there.	JPL · 7470
7472 Kumakiri	1992 CU	Kazuo Kumakiri (born 1923), a Japanese amateur astronomer in the Susono area who has done much to develop a local interest in astronomy.	JPL · 7472
7475 Kaizuka	1992 UX_{5}	Sohei Kaizuka (1926–1998), a Japanese geomorphologists. His significant academic achievements covered various landforms, from global to local scale. Many scientists have been inspired by his ideas and advice.	JPL · 7475
7476 Ogilsbie	1993 GE	Brian K. Ogilsbie (1970–1997), a close friend of American astronomer Timothy B. Spahr, who discovered this minor planet.	JPL · 7476
7477 Conversiluca	1993 LC	Luca Conversi, Italian astrophysicist at the European Space Agency. He has served as Instrument Scientist for ESA’s Herschel and Euclid missions.	IAU · 7477
7478 Hasse	1993 OA_{4}	Peter Hasse (1585–1640), a German organist	MPC · 7478
7480 Norwan	1994 PC	Norwan, the goddess of light of the Wintun Native American peoples of Northern California	MPC · 7480
7481 San Marcello	1994 PA_{1}	San Marcello Pistoiese in Italy, the mountain village where the Pian dei Termini Observatory is located.	MPC · 7481
7483 Sekitakakazu	1994 VO_{2}	Takakazu Seki (1642–1708), Japanese mathematician and calendar scientist	MPC · 7483
7484 Dogo Onsen	1994 WF_{4}	Dōgo Onsen, Japanese hot spring in Ehime	MPC · 7484
7485 Changchun	1994 XO	Changchun, a Chinese city, is the international sister city of Sendai, Japan, affiliated since 1980. Changchun is the capital of the Kitsurin province and the center of political and economical activities of the province.	JPL · 7485
7486 Hamabe	1994 XJ_{1}	Masaru Hamabe (born 1951), a professor at Japan Women's University.	JPL · 7486
7487 Toshitanaka	1994 YM	Toshinari Tanaka (born 1954), physicist and amateur astronomer.	JPL · 7487
7488 Robertpaul	1995 KB_{1}	Robert Paul Hergenrother (born 1976), the brother of astronomer Carl W. Hergenrother, who discovered this minor planet.	JPL · 7488
7489 Oribe	1995 MX	Takaaki Oribe (born 1972), Japanese researcher at Saji Observatory since its foundation in 1994, has contributed comet observations to the International Comet Quarterly. He serves as an executive member of a local astronomy club, "Tottori Society of Astronomy" and contributes to the popularization of astronomy.	JPL · 7489
7490 Babička	1995 OF_{1}	Marie Macháčová (1922–1998) and Marie Petrželová (1912–1998), the grandmothers of the discoverer's wife; and Emilie Dudková (1914–1977) and Aloisie Pravcová (born 1917), the grandmothers of the discoverer. This naming is also devoted to all grandmothers, who traditionally have a major role in bringing up children in the Czech nation. This role is also reflected in the novel "Babička" ("Granny"), written by Božena Němcová, based on her own childhood experience.	JPL · 7490
7491 Linzerag	1995 SD_{2}	Astronomical Society of Linz (Linzer Astronomische Gemeinschaft; Linzer A.G.), an association of Austrian amateur astronomers on the occasion of its 50th anniversary; the number of this minor planet, written backwards, is the year the association was founded (1947)	MPC · 7491
7492 Kačenka	1995 UX	Kateřina Macháčová (born 1975), wife of Czech astronomer Petr Pravec, who discovered this minor planet.	MPC · 7492
7493 Hirzo	1995 US_{2}	Hirzo (died 1275), Bohemian knight and founder of the royal town of České Budějovice, Czech Republic, home town of the discoverer, Jana Tichá	MPC · 7493
7494 Xiwanggongcheng	1995 UV_{48}	Project Hope (Xiwang Gongcheng), a non-profit social welfare program operated by the China Youth Development Foundation, on the occasion of its 10th anniversary.	JPL · 7494
7495 Feynman	1995 WS_{4}	Richard P. Feynman (1918–1988), American physicist and 1965 Nobel prize laureate	MPC · 7495
7496 Miroslavholub	1995 WN_{6}	Miroslav Holub (1923–1998), Czech immunologist, poet and essayist. His research resulted in the monograph Immunology of Nude Mice. His fine poetry combines the world of science and the world of everyday human experience, as shown, for example, in his book Supposed to Fly. Name proposed by the discoverer following a suggestion by J. Ticha.	JPL · 7496
7497 Guangcaishiye	1995 YY_{21}	The Glory Project (Guangcai Shiye), an open poverty relief activity in China. The project actively assists the poor with training, initiating enterprises, developing resources and carrying out commerce. Its operation promotes traditional Chinese virtues and advances the prospects of the poor.	JPL · 7497
7498 Blaník	1996 BF	Blaník Hill, Czech Republic, legendary resting place of the army of Saint Wenceslas	MPC · 7498
7499 L'Aquila	1996 OO_{2}	L'Aquila, a medieval Italian town of about 53,000 people near the Gran Sasso, in central Italy.	JPL · 7499
7500 Sassi	1996 TN	Giorgio Sassi (1918–2009), Italian amateur astronomer who co-founded the San Vittore Observatory (Src).	MPC · 7500

== 7501–7600 ==
back to top

Named minor planet	Provisional	This minor planet was named for...	Ref · Catalog
7501 Farra	1996 VD_{3}	The Italian town of Farra d'Isonzo and location of the Farra d'Isonzo Observatory, where this asteroid was discovered	JPL · 7501
7502 Arakida	1996 VP_{7}	Hideyoshi Arakida (born 1973) is an associate professor at Nihon University, who specializes in celestial mechanics, including solar system dynamics. His latest research interests are the null structure of spacetime and the effect of cosmological constant on the local system.	JPL · 7502
7504 Kawakita	1997 AF_{1}	Hideyo Kawakita (born 1970), Japanese astronomer and staff member at the Gunma Astronomical Observatory. His work includes comets, planets, and the formation of the Solar System.	JPL · 7504
7505 Furusho	1997 AM_{2}	Reiko Furusho (born 1970), a Japanese astronomer who works in cometary physics and in the education and popularization of astronomy. Her main scientific interests include the properties of cometary dust, especially polarization by dust particles.	JPL · 7505
7506 Lub	4837 P-L	Jan Lub (born 1946), Dutch astronomer	MPC · 7506
7507 Israel	7063 P-L	Frank Pieter Israel (born 1946), Dutch astronomer	MPC · 7507
7508 Icke	2327 T-3	Vincent Icke (born 1946), Dutch astronomer at Leiden Observatory	MPC · 7508
7509 Gamzatov	1977 EL	Rasul Gamzatov (1923–2003), Dagestanian poet	JPL · 7509
7511 Patcassen	1981 EX_{24}	Patrick Cassen (born 1940), American astrophysicist and planetary scientist at NASA's Ames Research Center. His research focuses on star and planet formation, the physics of circumstellar disks, and the application of astrophysical models to the formation of the solar system.	JPL · 7511
7512 Monicalazzarin	1983 CA_{1}	Monica Lazzarin (born 1963), Italian astronomer at Padova Observatory	JPL · 7512
7515 Marrucino	1986 EF_{5}	Marrucino was an ancient tribe that lived in Abruzzo. San Martino sulla Marrucina is renowned worldwide for its wine and chitarra, a special kind of pasta. It is also famous for polverieri, a group of artisans and merchants who for five centuries produced gunpowder from grape charcoal following a secret recipe	JPL · 7515
7516 Kranjc	1987 MC	Aldo Kranjc (1919–1994), Italian astronomer at the observatories in Naples, Milan and Bologna. He succeeded F. Zagar as director of Brera-Merate Observatory in 1971. His many activities and studies included general relativity and applications of electronic techniques to astronomy and spectroscopy. He was a pioneer in Italy on numerical electronic calculus. He wrote several programs and articles on orbit determination.	JPL · 7516
7517 Alisondoane	1989 AD	Alison Doane (1958–2017) has held the position of assistant curator (from 1983 to 2001) and curator (from 2001 to 2016) of astronomical photographs at the Harvard College Observatory. She was also principal oboe with the Boston Philharmonic Orchestra from 1982 to 2001.	JPL · 7517
7519 Paulcook	1989 UN_{3}	In the face of extreme physical problems resulting from an accident at age 12, Paul A. Cook (born 1981) has shown remarkable determination to use his mental powers to study astronomy. He has learned how to use a computer by special means and has produced some extremely good graphics for the discoverer.	JPL · 7519
7521 Wylezalek	1990 QS_{2}	Dominika Wylezalek, German astronomer.	IAU · 7521
7525 Kiyohira	1992 YE	Kiyohira Fujiwara (1056–1128), founder of Fujiwara clan in Japan	MPC · 7525
7526 Ohtsuka	1993 AA	Katsuhito Ohtsuka (born 1959), a curator of Tokyo Meteor Network and its meteorite collection.	JPL · 7526
7527 Marples	1993 BJ	Peter Marples (born 1958), Australian amateur astronomer, discoverer of supernova 2008fa in NGC 6722 and member of the Southern Astronomical Society	JPL · 7527
7528 Huskvarna	1993 FS_{39}	The Swedish city of Huskvarna	MPC · 7528
7529 Vagnozzi	1994 BC	Antonio Vagnozzi (born 1950), Italian amateur astronomer and discoverer of minor planets	JPL · 7529
7530 Mizusawa	1994 GO_{1}	Commemoration of hundredth anniversary of International Latitude Observatory at Mizusawa, Japan	MPC · 7530
7531 Pecorelli	1994 SC	Antonio Pecorelli (1923–1986), a long-time bus and tram conductor in Terni, near Rome, Italy	JPL · 7531
7532 Pelhřimov	1995 UR_{1}	Pelhřimov, town in the Czech Republic	MPC · 7532
7533 Seiraiji	1995 UE_{6}	Seiraiji is a Japanese Temple built in Sumoto, Japan, around 1000 CE, in the late Heian era. This Buddhist temple with graves is located on the small hill Kyuko-san, which was made by rivers in a delta area.	JPL · 7533
7536 Fahrenheit	1995 WB_{7}	Gabriel Fahrenheit (1686–1736), German-born Dutch scientist	MPC · 7536
7537 Solvay	1996 HS_{8}	Ernest Solvay (1838–1922), Belgian chemist and philanthropist	MPC · 7537
7538 Zenbei	1996 VE_{6}	Iwahashi Zenbei (1756–1811) is known for building the most superior Japanese telescope in the Edo era. His family worked as opticians in Osaka for four generations after him.	JPL · 7538
7541 Nieuwenhuis	4019 T-3	Henk Nieuwenhuis (born 1938), Dutch amateur astronomer, Eisinga Planetarium	MPC · 7541
7542 Johnpond	1953 GN	John Pond (1767–1836), sixth Astronomer Royal, is famous for the introduction of then-modern transit instruments at Greenwich Observatory and for publishing a high-precision star catalogue. Pond received the Copley Medal of the Royal Society	JPL · 7542
7543 Prylis	1973 SY	Prylis, son of Hermes from Greek mythology	MPC · 7543
7544 Tipografiyanauka	1976 UB_{2}	The oldest printing-house (tipografiya in Russian) of the Russian Academy of Sciences bears the name "Nauka" (science). It was founded in 1727 in St. Petersburg.	JPL · 7544
7545 Smaklösa	1978 OB	Smaklösa, Swedish musical group	MPC · 7545
7546 Meriam	1979 MB_{4}	The Meriam are an Indigenous Australian group of people in the islands of the eastern Torres Strait, united by a common language, who developed complex systems of astronomical knowledge that paved the way for modern ethnography.	JPL · 7546
7547 Martinnakata	1979 MO_{4}	Martin Nakata AM is a professor and Pro Vice-Chancellor (Indigenous Education and Strategy) at James Cook University in Townsville, Australia. He is an Indigenous Torres Strait Islander from the island of Naghir. He leads research and educational curricula at the interface of Indigenous astronomy and Western astrophysics.	JPL · 7547
7548 Engström	1980 FW_{2}	Albert Engström (1869–1940), Swedish writer and artist	MPC · 7548
7549 Woodard	1980 TO_{5}	Adrian Russell Woodard, youngest grandson of the discoverers Carolyn and Eugene Shoemaker	JPL · 7549
7550 Woolum	1981 EV_{8}	Dorothy S. Woolum (born 1942), American astrophysicist and meteoriticist	JPL · 7550
7551 Edstolper	1981 EF_{26}	Edward M. Stolper (born 1952), American geologist	JPL · 7551
7552 Sephton	1981 EB_{27}	Mark A. Sephton (born 1966), British geochemist and meteoriticist	JPL · 7552
7553 Buie	1981 FG	Marc W. Buie (born 1958), American astronomer and discoverer of minor planets	JPL · 7553
7554 Johnspencer	1981 GQ	John R. Spencer (born 1957), an astronomer at Lowell Observatory.	JPL · 7554
7555 Venvolkov	1981 SZ_{6}	Veniamin Vasilevich Volkov (born 1921), world-renowned ophthalmologist	JPL · 7555
7556 Perinaldo	1982 FX_{2}	The Italian village of Perinaldo in Liguria	JPL · 7556
7558 Yurlov	1982 TB_{2}	Aleksandr Aleksandrovich Yurlov (1927–1963), Russian choir master and choral conductor.	JPL · 7558
7559 Kirstinemeyer	1985 VF	Kirstine Meyer (1861–1941), first Danish woman to obtain a degree in physics (in 1892), founder of Fysisk Tidsskrift	JPL · 7559
7560 Spudis	1986 AJ	Paul Spudis (1952–2018), American planetary geologist and lunar scientist	JPL · 7560
7561 Patrickmichel	1986 TR_{2}	Patrick Michel (born 1970), French dynamicist.	JPL · 7561
7562 Kagiroino-Oka	1986 WO_{9}	Place in one of the poems in the collection Manyousyu	MPC · 7562
7564 Gokumenon	1988 CA	M. G. K. Menon (1928–2016; Mambillikalathil Govind Kumar Menon) professor of the Indian Space Research Organisation, who provided strong support for the 2.3-meter Vainu Bappu telescope and the Ootacamund radioastronomy facility	JPL · 7564
7565 Zipfel	1988 RD_{11}	Jutta Zipfel (born 1964), German curator of meteorites at the Senckenberg Research Institute (German: Forschungsinstitut Senckenberg) in Frankfurt	JPL · 7565
7571 Weisse Rose	1989 EH_{6}	White Rose (German: Die Weiße Rose), a resistance movement in Germany in World War II which called for nonviolent resistance to the Nazi regime. Numerous members of the movement were arrested and executed	MPC · 7571
7572 Znokai	1989 SF	Znokai, a cultural and social organization of staff of Mizusawa International Latitude Observatory	MPC · 7572
7573 Basfifty	1989 VX	Named for the Birmingham Astronomical Society in Birmingham, Great Britain, in celebration of its fiftieth anniversary in 2000. The Society was established in 1950, largely as a result of the University of Birmingham's extramural classes on astronomy.	JPL · 7573
7575 Kimuraseiji	1989 YK	Seiji Kimura (born 1932), an amateur astronomer.	JPL · 7575
7578 Georgböhm	1990 SP_{7}	Georg Böhm (1661–1733), German organist	MPC · 7578
7580 Schwabhausen	1990 TM_{7}	Schwabhausen Station of the Jena Observatory, located 10 kilometers from the city of Jena, Germany	MPC · 7580
7581 Yudovich	1990 VY_{13}	Viktor Iosifovich Yudovich (born 1934), a professor of mathematics at Rostov University, Russia	MPC · 7581
7583 Rosegger	1991 BA_{3}	Peter Rosegger (1843–1918), Austrian poet, novelist and writer	MPC · 7583
7584 Ossietzky	1991 GK_{10}	Carl von Ossietzky (1889–1938), German pacifist and recipient of the Nobel Peace Prize in 1935	MPC · 7584
7586 Bismarck	1991 RH_{7}	Otto von Bismarck (1815–1898), Prussian prime minister and minister of foreign affairs and, from 1871, the so-called Great Chancellor of the German Reich.	JPL · 7586
7587 Weckmann	1992 CF_{3}	Matthias Weckmann (c. 1616–1674), German organist	MPC · 7587
7590 Aterui	1992 UP_{4}	Aterui, patriarch of the Ainu tribe in northern Japan in the late eighth century	JPL · 7590
7592 Takinemachi	1992 WR_{3}	Takine, a town in Fukushima prefecture, 250 km north of Tokyo	JPL · 7592
7593 Cernuschi	1993 WG_{3}	Félix Cernuschi (1907–1999), an Uruguayan physicist and astrophysicist and founder of Uruguay's first university dedicated to research and education in physics and astronomy.	IAU · 7593
7594 Shotaro	1993 BH_{2}	Shotaro Miyamoto (1912–1992), professor of astrophysics at Kyoto University	JPL · 7594
7595 Växjö	1993 FN_{26}	The Swedish city of Växjö	MPC · 7595
7596 Yumi	1993 GH	Shigeru Yumi (1916–?), Japanese astronomer and a former director of the International Polar Motion Service	MPC · 7596
7597 Shigemi	1993 GM	Shigemi Uchida (born 1952) is actively working to combat light pollution in Japan. He is an organizer of the Japan Section of the International Dark Sky Association and also a member of the Japanese dark-sky organization Hoshizora-wo-Mamoru-Kai.	JPL · 7597
7599 Munari	1994 PB	Ulisse Munari (born 1960), Italian astronomer and discoverer of minor planets	MPC · 7599
7600 Vacchi	1994 RB_{1}	Ciro Vacchi (born 1916), Italian amateur astronomer and co-founder of the San Vittore Observatory at Bologna, Italy	MPC · 7600

== 7601–7700 ==
back to top

Named minor planet	Provisional	This minor planet was named for...	Ref · Catalog
7602 Yidaeam	1994 YW_{1}	Dae-am Yi (born 1955), vice president of Saekung College in the Republic of Korea	JPL · 7602
7603 Salopia	1995 OA_{2}	Latin name for Shropshire, England	MPC · 7603
7604 Kridsadaporn	1995 QY_{2}	Kridsadaporn (San) Ritsmitchai (1964–2004) was born in Songhkla, Thailand. She and her husband Martin Callaway both lived and worked at Siding Spring Observatory. San is remembered in Coonabarabran for her caring nature and community work. She died in a car accident.	JPL · 7604
7605 Cindygraber	1995 SR_{1}	Cynthia Jean (Volinsky) Graber (born 1956) is an American psychologist, theatre aficionado, nature lover and rock collector. A steadfast advocate for kindness, compassion and curiosity, she has spent more than 30 years helping adults, children, and families navigate the human condition with warmth and patience.	JPL · 7605
7607 Billmerline	1995 SB_{13}	William J. Merline (born 1954), planetary scientist at the Southwest Research Institute in Boulder, Colorado.	JPL · 7607
7608 Telegramia	1995 UO_{1}	The IAU Circulars (originally circulated by telegram)	MPC · 7608
7610 Sudbury	1995 XB	Sudbury, Massachusetts	JPL · 7610
7611 Hashitatsu	1996 BW_{1}	Tatsuo Hashimoto (born 1912) has been a member of the Oriental Astronomical Association since the 1930s and an advisor to the Oita Astronomical Society since its founding in 1979. In 1944 he won a patent for his invention of a new type of protractor in which a right angle has 60 degrees.	JPL · 7611
7613 ʻAkikiki	1996 DK	The ʻakikiki (Oreomystis bairdi), or Kauaʻi creeper, is a critically endangered Hawaiian honeycreeper, now found only in high-elevation rainforests on Kauaʻi.	JPL · 7613
7614 Masatomi	1996 EA	Masatomi Urata (born 1925) has been a member of the Oriental Astronomical Association and an active observer of meteors since 1943. He has also been an adviser to the Oita Astronomical Society since its founding in 1979 and has greatly contributed to the growth of younger astronomers.	JPL · 7614
7616 Sadako	1996 VF_{2}	Sadako Sasaki (1943–1955) was exposed to radiation from the Hiroshima atom bomb and suffered from leukemia. She tried to fold 1000 paper cranes in prayer for recovery, but in vain. Impressed by her story, children around the world raised funds and built the Children's Peace Monument in Hiroshima Peace Memorial Park.	JPL · 7616
7618 Gotoyukichi	1997 AU_{4}	Yukichi Goto (1896–1929), pioneer of civil aviation in Japan.	JPL · 7618
7620 Willaert	4077 P-L	Adrian Willaert (1485–1562), Flemish composer	MPC · 7620
7621 Sweelinck	4127 P-L	Jan Pieterszoon Sweelinck (1562–1621), Dutch composer and organist	MPC · 7621
7622 Pergolesi	6624 P-L	Giovanni Battista Pergolesi (1710–1736), Italian composer	MPC · 7622
7623 Stamitz	9508 P-L	Johann Stamitz (1717–1757), German-Bohemian violinist and composer	MPC · 7623
7624 Gluck	1251 T-1	Christoph Willibald Gluck (1714–1787), German composer	MPC · 7624
7625 Louisspohr	2150 T-2	Louis Spohr (1784–1859), German composer and violinist	MPC · 7625
7626 Iafe	1976 QL_{2}	IAFE, the Argentine Institute of Astronomy and Space Physics (Instituto de Astronomía y Física del Espacio) in Buenos Aires, Argentina	JPL · 7626
7627 Wakenokiyomaro	1977 DS_{4}	Wake no Kiyomaro, Japanese official	MPC · 7627
7628 Evgenifedorov	1977 QY	Evgenij Pavlovich Fedorov (1909–1986), an astrometrist	JPL · 7628
7629 Foros	1977 QK_{1}	Crimean health resort	MPC · 7629
7630 Yidumduma	1979 MR_{2}	Bill Yidumduma Harney (born 1931) is a Senior Elder of the Wardaman Aboriginal people of Australia's Northern Territory. He has shared his traditional astronomical knowledge through film, television, and books, including Dark Sparkers and Four Circles.	JPL · 7630
7631 Vokrouhlický	1981 WH	David Vokrouhlický (born 1966), a Czech physicist at Charles University, Prague.	JPL · 7631
7632 Stanislav	1982 UT_{5}	Stanislav Volodymyrovych Tel'nyuk (1935–1990), Ukrainian poet, public figure and father of Lesya and Galyna, known as The Telnyuk Sisters	MPC · 7632
7633 Volodymyr	1982 UD_{7}	Volodymyr Volodymyrovych Tel'nyuk-Adamchuk (born 1936), Ukrainian astronomer and vice president of the Ukrainian Astronomical Association and director of the Kiev University Observatory	MPC · 7633
7634 Shizutani-Kou	1982 VO_{3}	Oldest Japanese school building	MPC · 7634
7635 Carolinesmith	1983 VH_{1}	Caroline Smith (born 1976) the Head of Earth Sciences Collections and Principal Curator of Meteorites at the Natural History Museum in London. She studies mineralogy of meteorites, notably ureilites, to understand planetary processes, collected meteorites in Australia and has been principal editor of the Meteoritical Bulletin.	JPL · 7635
7636 Comba	1984 CM	Paul G. Comba (born 1926), who gave up a career in celestial mechanics and astronomy for one in mathematics and computer science.	JPL · 7636
7638 Gladman	1984 UX	Brett J. Gladman (born 1966), a Canadian astronomer (Src)	MPC · 7638
7639 Offutt	1985 DC_{1}	Warren B. Offutt (1928–2017), was an American amateur astronomer and discoverer of minor planets, on the occasion of his 70th birthday, 1998 Feb. 13. After a career as an engineering executive, he turned in his retirement to the astronomical applications of CCDs, considering in particular the contributions that can be made by amateur astronomers. At his observatory in New Mexico he has made key observations of several of the objects discovered in the Kuiper Belt in recent years, as well as of other comets and minor planets as faint as 22nd magnitude. His follow-up of S/1997 U 2, one of the two recently discovered satellites of Uranus, played a crucial role in the establishment of its orbit.	JPL · 7639
7640 Marzari	1985 PX	Francesco Marzari (born 1961), an Italian planetary scientist at the University of Padua	JPL · 7640
7641 Cteatus	1986 TT_{6}	Cteatus, from Greek mythology. He was born a conjoined twin of Eurytus and later was the father of Amphimachus.	IAU · 7641
7644 Cslewis	1988 VR_{5}	C. S. Lewis, British writer	MPC · 7644
7645 Pons	1989 AC_{2}	Jean Louis Pons, French astronomer	MPC · 7645
7647 Etrépigny	1989 SR_{2}	Étrépigny, French village	MPC · 7647
7648 Tomboles	1989 TB_{1}	Tom Boles, British amateur astronomer, supernova hunter, president of the British Astronomical Association during 2003–2005, and discoverer of 84417 Ritabo	JPL · 7648
7649 Bougainville	1990 SV_{5}	Louis-Antoine de Bougainville, French explorer	MPC · 7649
7650 Kaname	1990 UG	Kaname Nakamura (1904–1932), Japanese amateur astronomer and volunteer at the Kwasan Observatory	JPL · 7650
7651 Villeneuve	1990 VD_{6}	Don Villeneuve, anthropologist, friend of the discoverer Eric Walter Elst	MPC · 7651
7655 Adamries	1991 YM_{1}	Adam Ries (1492–1559), German arithmetician and author of the first arithmetic books in German	MPC · 7655
7656 Joemontani	1992 HX	Joseph L. Montani (born 1952), is an American researcher, instrumentalist, observational astronomer, and optics expert with the LPL of the University of Arizona and member of the Spacewatch team, who most recently discovered many near-earth minor planets, main-belt asteroids, and four (4) comets including 314P/Montani. He has also had previous careers in laboratory astrophysics (modeling asteroidal surfaces), and in millimeter-wave radio-astronomy, and airborne and ground-based infrared-astronomy (Src)	MPC · 7656
7657 Jefflarsen	1992 HK_{1}	Jeffrey A. Larsen (born 1967), a software expert.	JPL · 7657
7660 Alexanderwilson	1993 VM_{1}	Alexander Wilson (1714–1786) was the first professor of practical astronomy at the University of Glasgow. He measured atmospheric temperature with height and, from the "Wilson Effect", developed a model of sunspots	JPL · 7660
7661 Reincken	1994 PK_{38}	Johann Adam Reincken, German organist	MPC · 7661
7664 Namahage	1994 TE_{3}	The Namahage is a folk event that has been handed down from olden times in Oga Peninsula in Akita Prefecture. It is designated an "Important Intangible Folk Cultural Property".	JPL · 7664
7665 Putignano	1994 TK_{3}	Putignano, a town and comune in the province of Bari, Apulia, Italy	MPC · 7665
7666 Keyaki	1994 VC_{1}	The Zelkova serrata tree, (keyaki in Japanese) an ornamental tree prominent in the city of Sendai, Japan	MPC · 7666
7668 Mizunotakao	1995 BR_{3}	Takao Mizuno, a professor at Tokyo's Gakugei University.	JPL · 7668
7669 Malše	1995 PB	The Malše, Czech river	MPC · 7669
7670 Kabeláč	1995 QJ	Miloslav Kabeláč (1908–1979), a Czech composer and conductor	MPC · 7670
7671 Albis	1995 UK_{1}	Latin name for the Elbe river	MPC · 7671
7672 Hawking	1995 UO_{2}	Stephen Hawking (1942–2018), British physicist	MPC · 7672
7673 Inohara	1995 UY_{3}	Masanori Inohara (born 1921) has been an amateur astronomer since childhood. He contributed greatly to the popularization of astronomy, especially in schools after the Second World War, when Japan was very poor. He is also an enthusiastic chaser of solar eclipses.	JPL · 7673
7674 Kasuga	1995 VO_{1}	Ryo Kasuga (born 1950), Japanese Buddhist priest	MPC · 7674
7675 Gorizia	1995 WT_{5}	Gorizia, the Italian town on the 1000th anniversary of the first mention of its actual name in an official document. Gorizia is the main city in the lowlands of river Isonzo River.	JPL · 7675
7677 Sawa	1995 YP_{3}	Takeyasu Sawa (born 1949), a professor of education at Aichi University.	JPL · 7677
7678 Onoda	1996 CW_{2}	The city of Onoda in Yamaguchi Prefecture, Japan	MPC · 7678
7679 Asiago	1996 CA_{9}	The Italian town of Asiago, where the Asiago Observatory and its station is located	MPC · 7679
7680 Cari	1996 HB	Amleto Cari (1904–1982), versatile athlete of rare talent, from 1919 to 1933 he was captain of the Terni football team that, under his guidance, reached the national league.	JPL · 7680
7681 Chenjingrun	1996 YK_{2}	Chen Jingrun (1933–1996) a Chinese mathematician	MPC · 7681
7682 Miura	1997 CY_{19}	Katsumi Miura, technical official of the Earthquake Research Institute of the University of Tokyo.	JPL · 7682
7683 Wuwenjun	1997 DE	Wenjun Wu (1919–), a member of the Chinese Academy of Sciences, is the originator in the research on mathematics mechanization in China.	JPL · 7683
7684 Marioferrero	1997 EY	Mario A. Ferrero (1904–1965), Italian astronomer	MPC · 7684
7686 Wolfernst	2024 P-L	Wolfgang Ernst (born 1947), German amateur astronomer associated with the Starkenburg Observatory	JPL · 7686
7687 Matthias	2099 P-L	Matthias Busch (born 1968), German amateur astronomer associated with the Starkenburg Observatory	JPL · 7687
7688 Lothar	2536 P-L	Lothar Kurtze (born 1972), German amateur astronomer	JPL · 7688
7689 Reinerstoss	4036 P-L	Reiner Michael Stoss (born 1975), German amateur astronomer and discoverer of minor planets	JPL · 7689
7690 Sackler	2291 T-1	Raymond Sackler and Beverly Sackler, Purdue Pharma owner and wife as beneficiaries	JPL · 7690
7691 Brady	3186 T-3	Charles E. Brady Jr. (born 1951), a captain in the U.S. Navy, NASA astronaut, surgeon, experienced amateur radio operator and close friend to the name proposer.	JPL · 7691
7692 Edhenderson	1981 EZ_{25}	Edward P. Henderson (1898–1992), American curator of meteorites at the Smithsonian Institution until 1992.	JPL · 7692
7693 Hoshitakuhai	1982 WE	"Hoshitakuhai" (Home delivery of the starry skies) is an activity of the Kakogawa Space Science Association that brings the wonders of the stars to the public	JPL · 7693
7694 Krasetín	1983 SF	Krasetín, a small Czech village near to the Kleť Observatory	MPC · 7694
7695 Přemysl	1984 WA_{1}	Přemysl, legendary Bohemian ruler	MPC · 7695
7696 Liebe	1988 JD	Bodo Liebe, a professor at the University of Siegen.	JPL · 7696
7698 Schweitzer	1989 AS_{6}	Albert Schweitzer (1875–1965), German theologian, musician, philosopher, physician and Nobelist	MPC · 7698
7699 Božek	1989 CB_{4}	Josef Božek, Czech engineer	MPC · 7699
7700 Rote Kapelle	1990 TE_{8}	Rote Kapelle, a left-wing and communist resistance group who fought against the fascist regime, operating mainly in Berlin and Hamburg.	JPL · 7700

== 7701–7800 ==
back to top

Named minor planet	Provisional	This minor planet was named for...	Ref · Catalog
7701 Zrzavý	1990 TX_{8}	Jan Zrzavý, Czech artist	MPC · 7701
7703 Jimcooney	1991 RW	James “Jim” Cooney, American award-winning senior lecturer of astronomy at the University of Vermont.	IAU · 7703
7704 Dellen	1992 EB_{7}	Dellen, Swedish lake system formed by a meteor impact	MPC · 7704
7705 Humeln	1993 FU_{7}	Humeln, Swedish lake formed by a meteor impact	MPC · 7705
7706 Mien	1993 FZ_{36}	Mien, Swedish lake formed by a meteor impact	MPC · 7706
7707 Yes	1993 HM_{1}	Yes, an English rock and roll music group, has been creating music since 1968. The band is best known for its albums The Yes Album, Fragile, Close to the Edge and 90125.	JPL · 7707
7708 Fennimore	1994 GF_{9}	Guy Fennimore, British secretary of the Society for Popular Astronomy (formerly the Junior Astronomical Society)	JPL · 7708
7710 Ishibashi	1994 WT_{2}	Tadashi Ishibashi (born 1926), retired sea captain, became interested in stars in 1936 and has observed meteors since 1940. Since 1947 he has collected and studied ancient documents about the stars. Currently he lectures on star topics aboard large passenger ships	JPL · 7710
7711 Říp	1994 XF	Říp, a hill near Prague, Czech Republic	MPC · 7711
7713 Tsutomu	1995 YE	Tsutomu Ishibashi (born 1949), a Japanese amateur astronomer, has been using the same 0.1-m reflector to photograph Mars, Jupiter and Saturn since 1971 in order to maintain uniformity in the data contained in the images	JPL · 7713
7714 Briccialdi	1996 CC_{1}	Giulio Briccialdi (1818–1881), Italian flutist and composer	MPC · 7714
7715 Leonidarosino	1996 CR_{7}	Leonida Rosino (1915–1997), Italian astronomer and director of the Padua and Asiago Observatorie	MPC · 7715
7716 Ube	1996 DA_{3}	The city of Ube located in Yamaguchi Prefecture, Japan	MPC · 7716
7717 Tabeisshi	1997 AL_{5}	Japanese amateur astronomer Isshi Tabe (born 1956) has observed Jupiter and other planets for over 25 years and has published many articles about planets. In 1997 he was given a Magellan Award by the Oriental Astronomical Association. He is also well known as a planetarium program producer	JPL · 7717
7718 Desnoux	1997 EP_{30}	Valerie Desnoux, French amateur astronomer, who was an assistant developer of the heliometer at the Pic du Midi Observatory	MPC · 7718
7720 Lepaute	4559 P-L	Nicole-Reine Lepaute (1723–1788), a French astronomer and mathematician, who help to compute the needed prediction of the 1759 return of Halley's Comet	JPL · 7720
7721 Andrillat	6612 P-L	Yvette Marie Josette (born 1925), French spectroscopist and director of the Haute-Provence Observatory, and her husband Henri Andrillat, French cosmologist and professor of astronomy	MPC · 7721
7722 Firneis	2240 T-2	Maria Gertrude Firneis (born 1937), Austrian astronomer and a professor of astronomy at the University of Vienna.	MPC · 7722
7723 Lugger	1952 QW	Phyllis Lugger (born 1954), on the faculty of Indiana University, is known for her work on the luminosity functions of galaxies in clusters and on the dynamics of globular clusters and stellar systems, including the Milky Way galaxy and interacting binary stars. She has also worked on the identification of x-ray sources	JPL · 7723
7724 Moroso	1970 OB	Pascuala Moroso, Argentine farmer, upon whose land the Complejo Astronómico El Leoncito (the discovery site) lies	JPL · 7724
7725 Selʹvinskij	1972 RX_{1}	Ilʹya Lʹvovich Selʹvinskij, Soviet poet	MPC · 7725
7726 Olegbykov	1974 QM_{2}	Oleg Pavlovich Bykov (born 1938), a Russian astronomer at the Pulkovo Observatory, is a specialist in astrometry and theoretical astronomy especially known for his work on orbit determination of minor planets and other bodies by the method of parameters of apparent motion and analysis of the astrometric observations.	JPL · 7726
7727 Chepurova	1975 EA_{3}	Valentina Mikhajlovna Chepurova, a celestial mechanician at the Sternberg Astronomical Institute in Moscow, is known for her research on the dynamics of the small bodies of the solar system by analytical and qualitative methods. As chair of celestial mechanics, she is also much involved with the education of students	JPL · 7727
7728 Giblin	1977 AW_{2}	Ian Giblin (born 1969), a British physicist who has performed a number of laboratory experiments to simulate hypervelocity impacts among minor planets. Giblin has developed new data analysis tools to study their outcome and to draw conclusions regarding the corresponding actual events. Name proposed and citation written by P. Farinella.	JPL · 7728
7729 Golovanov	1977 QY_{3}	Yaroslav Kirillovich Golovanov (born 1932) a Russian space engineer and scientific journalist who writes scientific reviews on space problems. As the author of many hundreds of articles and more than 20 books, he is the laureate of many prizes and awards, including the "Golden Pen" medal, the highest award of the Union of Soviet Journalists.	JPL · 7729
7730 Sergerasimov	1978 NN_{1}	Sergei Gerasimov, 20th-century Soviet actor, pedagogue, film director, and scenario writer	JPL · 7730
7732 Ralphpass	1978 VE_{9}	Ralph Pass (born 1946), American mathematician and amateur astronomer who worked at NASA for the Apollo and Space Shuttle programs. He has also been Director of the Mendel Observatory (W82) at Merrimack College in Massachusetts (Src).	IAU · 7732
7733 Segarpassi	1979 MH_{4}	Segar Passi (born 1942) is a Dauareb man and senior elder on Mer (Murray Island) in Australia's Torres Strait. He is an artist who shares extensive traditional knowledge about ecology, meteorology, and astronomy, having co-authored a number of academic papers on the subject.	JPL · 7733
7734 Kaltenegger	1979 MZ_{6}	Austrian-born Lisa Kaltenegger (born 1977) is associate professor of astronomy and director of the Carl Sagan Institute at Cornell University. Her research focuses on exploring new worlds orbiting other stars, especially rocky planets and super-Earths and their atmospheres in the habitable zone. She is an expert in modeling potential habitable worlds and their detectable spectral fingerprint, which can be detected with the next generation of telescopes.	JPL · 7734
7735 Scorzelli	1980 UL_{1}	Rosa Scorzelli (born 1940) is a Brazilian meteoriticist at the Centro Brasileiro de Pesquisas Físicas. Her research has focused on Mossbauer studies of metallic meteorites to understand the complex cooling histories they experienced during the core formation of minor planets.	JPL · 7735
7736 Nizhnij Novgorod	1981 RC_{5}	Nizhny Novgorod, is an old Russian city located at the confluence of the Volga and Oka rivers. Founded in 1221, the city is now a large industrial, scientific and cultural center. It is known for many architectural monuments and the famous Nizhnij Novgorod Fair.	JPL · 7736
7737 Sirrah	1981 VU	Alan William Harris (born 1952), a British astronomer. (The name Sirrah is "Harris" spelled backwards)	MPC · 7737
7738 Heyman	1981 WS_{1}	Michael Heyman (born 1930), secretary and linchpin of the Smithsonian Institution's diverse and incomparably rich programs. Educator, legal scholar, civil rights champion, he has unfailingly supported research at the frontiers of astronomy	JPL · 7738
7739 Čech	1982 CE	Eduard Čech, Czech mathematician	MPC · 7739
7740 Petit	1983 RR_{2}	French astronomer Jean-Marc Petit (born 1961) for his work on the dynamics of planetary rings. Petit has also investigated the collisional evolution of the minor planet belt and the dynamical evolution of the (243) Ida-Dactyl system. Name suggested and citation provided by A. Morbidelli	JPL · 7740
7741 Fedoseev	1983 RR_{4}	Vladimir Ivanovich Fedoseev (born 1932), outstanding Russian conductor. He has been artistic director of Tchaikovsky's symphony orchestra in Moscow since 1974. He is also a principal conductor of the Vienna Symphony Orchestra and guest conductor in Tokyo and in many other cities. Fedoseev promotes the Russian classical music of Glinka, Mussorgsky, Rakhmaninov, Sviridov and others. Name suggested by G. Sviridov and supported by the discoverer	JPL · 7741
7742 Altamira	1985 US	Altamira is a cave in northern Spain, whose walls bear paintings and engravings – chiefly of bison, deer, horses and boar – dating from the Stone Age. It is one of the most important prehistoric painted caves. The paintings were discovered in 1879. The name was suggested by M. Tichy.	JPL · 7742
7747 Michałowski	1987 SO	Tadeusz Michałowski (born 1954), Polish astronomer at the Astronomical Observatory of Adam Mickiewicz University in Posnan. Michałowski developed a formalism for computing the pole orientation, shape and sidereal rotation period of a minor planet, incorporating both the magnitude and timing information contained in lightcurve observations, in a simultaneous least-squares solution. This method, or methods similar to it, are now widely used standard analysis tools, and they have greatly improved the quality of such determinations. Name suggested by H. Rickman, citation prepared by A. W. Harris.	JPL · 7747
7749 Jackschmitt	1988 JP	Harrison 'Jack' Schmitt, American planetary geologist, last astronaut on the Moon, and later a senator	JPL · 7749
7750 McEwen	1988 QD_{1}	Alfred McEwen, American planetary geologist	JPL · 7750
7752 Otauchunokai	1988 US	Otauchunokai, founded in 1970, is an amateur astronomers' club in the Ota city area, Gunma prefecture. Club activities include observations, studies and public education in astronomy. The discoverers are members of this club	JPL · 7752
7754 Gopalan	1989 TT_{11}	Gopalan Srinivasan (born 1964) is a Canadian geologist, meteoriticist and professor in the department of geology at the University of Toronto. His research focuses on understanding the formation and evolution of the solar system through chemical and isotopic studies of meteorites.	JPL · 7754
7755 Haute-Provence	1989 YO_{5}	Haute-Provence is a very beautiful region in southern France where, in 1936, the astronomical Haute-Provence Observatory was established. In 1995, the first planet discovered orbiting a star (51 Peg), was found there. From 1986 to 1996, the 60/90 Schmidt telescope was used to search for minor planets	JPL · 7755
7756 Scientia	1990 FR_{1}	Scientia, the Latin word for science or knowledge, describes the purpose of the U.S. National Science Foundation on the occasion of its 50th anniversary in the year 2000. The NSF has acted as a "patron for pure science", consistently championing excellence in activities that span the entire range of scientific endeavor.	JPL · 7756
7757 Kameya	1990 KO	Osamu Kameya, a researcher at the National Astronomical Observatory of Japan.	JPL · 7757
7758 Poulanderson	1990 KT	Poul Anderson (1926–2001), American science fiction writer who has trained three generations of scientists, engineers and others to appreciate humor, adventure, epic tragedy and the vast scale of the universe. Admired for his mentoring and personal warmth, he has won shelves of literary awards. The name was suggested by D. Brin.	JPL · 7758
7763 Crabeels	1990 UT_{5}	Henri Crabeels (born 1904) is an internationally known organist and conductor in Antwerp. This minor planet is dedicated to him on the occasion of his 98th birthday	JPL · 7763
7766 Jododaira	1991 BH_{2}	Jododaira is the place where the first big star parties were held in Japan, the "Chiro's Star Festivals", from 1975 to 1984. Jododaira (1600 m above the sea) is near the top of Mt. Azuma, a famous volcano in Fukushima Prefecture in northeastern Japan. After the violent eruption of the volcano in 1893, Percival Lowell climbed the mountain to investigate the result of the eruption. One hundred years later, an astronomical observatory was established there and is open to the public. Name proposed by the discoverers following a suggestion by M. Koishikawa and T. Sato	JPL · 7766
7767 Tomatic	1991 RB_{5}	A. U. Tomatic (born 1997), collaborator at the Minor Planet Center. An ardent computer of orbits and distributor of observational data of minor planets and comets, Tomatic published his first contribution to this field on MPEC 1997-Y01 (1997 Dec. 16). Tomatic is a godchild of the MPC astronomers B. G. Marsden and G. V. Williams. Name proposed by the first discoverer in gratitude for Tomatic's indefatigable service	JPL · 7767
7769 Okuni	1991 VF_{4}	Tomimaru Okuni (born 1931), a retired teacher, is a Japanese amateur astronomer. He has been discovering new minor planets since 1995 at Nanyo in Yamagata prefecture	JPL · 7769
7770 Siljan	1992 EQ_{8}	Siljan, Swedish lake formed by a meteor impact † Archived 2007-06-24 at the Wayback Machine	MPC · 7770
7771 Tvären	1992 EZ_{9}	Tvären, Swedish lake formed by a meteor impact † Archived 2007-06-24 at the Wayback Machine	MPC · 7771
7773 Kyokuchiken	1992 FS	The National Institute of Polar Research (Japan) (NIPR) also known by its shortened Japanese name "Kyokuchiken". The institute engages in research via its observation stations in the Arctic and Antarctica. It is also an inter-university research institute that supports researchers and works to promote polar science.	JPL · 7773
7775 Taiko	1992 XD	Taiko Takeuchi, a Japanese amateur astronomer	MPC · 7775
7776 Takeishi	1993 BF	Masanori Takeishi (born 1950), a Japanese amateur astronomer and discoverer of minor planets	MPC · 7776
7777 Consadole	1993 CO_{1}	Consadole, a team in the Japan Professional Football League J1, has its home in Sapporo city, Hokkaido. The team's name is an anagram combining the Japanese word Dosanco ("born in Hokkaido") and the Spanish olé ("bravo!"), a common international cheer at soccer games. The name was suggested by K. Watanabe	JPL · 7777
7778 Markrobinson	1993 HK_{1}	Mark Robinson, an American planetary geologist who has worked on M-type bodies (Mercury, Moon, Mars, and Minor Planets). He began his career in Alaska, where he prospected for mineral ores and earned his B.S. in geology at the University of Alaska. In Hawaii, he completed his doctorate in 1993 on lunar and martian volcanism and then began his outstanding work on the Clementine mission to the Moon as a member of the U.S. Geological Survey Astrogeology Branch. His efforts, which he continues from his new base at Northwestern University, are now directed to the NEAR spacecraft mission and to future exploration of Mercury. Citation prepared with the assistance of A. McEwen.	JPL · 7778
7779 Susanring	1993 KL	Susan Ivanka Ring (1956–2016), Australian amateur astronomer and member of the Canberra Astronomical Society	MPC · 7779
7780 Maren	1993 NJ	Maren Elizabeth Child	JPL · 7780
7781 Townsend	1993 QT	Charles Townsend, a laser physicist and community-college instructor of astronomy and mathematics	MPC · 7781
7782 Mony	1994 CY	Monica De Magistris (1977–1998), a student of physics at Perugia University and a great lover of astronomy who sometimes visited the Santa Lucia observatory. She organized an astronomy exposition as part of Italy's "Scientific and Technological Culture Week" in 1995, giving lectures on the subject to visitors. In her struggle with illness, she was an example of strength, intelligence and passion throughout her short life	JPL · 7782
7784 Watterson	1994 PL	Bill Watterson (born 1958), the author of the iconic cartoon strip Calvin and Hobbes.	JPL · 7784
7786 Norikazunagata	1994 TB_{15}	Norikazu Nagata, Japanese amateur astronomer.	IAU · 7786
7787 Annalaura	1994 WW	Annalaura Calvani, wife of Luciano Tesi, co-discoverer of the object †	MPC · 7787
7788 Tsukuba	1994 XS	The city of Tsukuba in Ibaraki Prefecture, Japan	MPC · 7788
7789 Kwiatkowski	1994 XE_{6}	Tomasz Kwiatkowski, Polish astronomer at Poznań Observatory	MPC · 7789
7790 Miselli	1995 DK_{2}	Furio Miselli (1867–1949), Italian poet, singer and songwriter	MPC · 7790
7791 Ebicykl	1995 EB	Ebicykl, a tradition of cycling to Czech and Slovak observatories held by a group of astronomers	MPC · 7791
7793 Mutlu-Pakdil	1995 YC_{3}	Burçin Mutlu-Pakdil, Turkish astrophysicist and professor at Dartmouth College.	IAU · 7793
7794 Sanvito	1996 AD_{4}	Roberto di San Vito, amateur astronomer. Strongly committed to astronomy and astrometry, he is supporting a new observatory in Montelupo that will bear his name, the "San Vito Observatory"	JPL · 7794
7796 Járacimrman	1996 BG	Jára da Cimrman, fictional Czech genius	MPC · 7796
7797 Morita	1996 BK_{2}	Yukio Morita (born 1952), a dentist in Hiroshima, is an expert on planetary photography and one of the most active members of the Mars section of the Oriental Astronomical Association	JPL · 7797
7799 Martinšolc	1996 DW_{1}	Martin Šolc (born 1949), Czech astronomer and head of the Astronomical Institute of Charles University in Prague	MPC · 7799
7800 Zhongkeyuan	1996 EW_{2}	Named for the Chinese Academy of Sciences (zhong guo ke xue yuan) on the occasion of its 50th anniversary. Founded on 1949 Nov. 1, it is China's most prestigious academic institution and comprehensive research and development center in science and technology. Over the past half century, the Chinese Academy of Sciences has made tremendous contributions to science and technology in China, to the country's economic construction and development and to human civilization and progress	JPL · 7800

== 7801–7900 ==
back to top

Named minor planet	Provisional	This minor planet was named for...	Ref · Catalog
7801 Goretti	1996 GG_{2}	Vittorio Goretti (1939–2016), Italian amateur astronomer and a discoverer of minor planets	MPC · 7801
7802 Takiguchi	1996 XG_{1}	Setsuo Takiguchi (1924–1998), Japanese founder and first director of the Hiroshima Children's Museum	JPL · 7802
7803 Adachi	1997 EW_{2}	Makoto Adachi (born 1953), Japanese elementary school teacher, amateur astronomer, and director of the Oriental Astronomical Association	JPL · 7803
7804 Boesgaard	3083 P-L	Ann Merchant Boesgaard (born 1939), American astronomer †	MPC · 7804
7805 Moons	7610 P-L	Michèle Moons (born 1951), a Belgian astronomer	JPL · 7805
7806 Umasslowell	1971 UM	University of Massachusetts Lowell	JPL · 7806
7807 Grier	1975 SJ_{1}	JA Grier (born 1968), American planetary scientist	JPL · 7807
7808 Bagould	1976 GL_{8}	Benjamin Apthorp Gould (1824–1896), a pioneering American astronomer, founder of the Astronomical Journal, first director of the Córdoba Observatory, initiator of the Uranometria Argentina	JPL · 7808
7809 Marcialangton	1979 ML_{1}	Marcia Langton (born 1951) is a Yiman Aboriginal woman, professor, Associate Provost, and Foundation Chair of Australian Indigenous Studies at the University of Melbourne. She leads efforts to incorporate Australian Indigenous astronomical perspectives into the Australian National Curriculum.	JPL · 7809
7811 Zhaojiuzhang	1982 DT_{6}	Zhao Jiuzhang (1907–1968), a Chinese physicist and pioneer of the Chinese satellite program	JPL · 7811
7812 Billward	1984 UT	William Ward (born 1943), a theoretician who specializes in dynamics and celestial mechanics. Ward has made fundamental contributions to a wide variety of topics in modern planetary science, including both solar nebula and circumplanetary disk dynamics, the origin of the moon, planetesimal formation, planetary ring dynamics, and martian obliquity variations and their coupling to planetwide climatological change. Ward has spent most of his career at the Jet Propulsion Laboratory and Southwest Research Institute, Boulder. Both his talents and his good spirits are enjoyed by colleagues around the world. Name proposed and citation written by S. A. Stern	JPL · 7812
7813 Anderserikson	1985 UF_{3}	Anders Erikson (born 1965), Swedish astronomer who studied minor-planet spin vectors in Uppsala and at the Institute of Planetary Exploration in Berlin.	JPL · 7813
7815 Dolon	1987 QN	Dolon, mythical Trojan warrior from Greek mythology	MPC · 7815
7816 Hanoi	1987 YA	The city of Hanoi, capital of Vietnam	MPC · 7816
7817 Zibiturtle	1988 RH_{10}	Elizabeth Turtle, American planetary scientist	JPL · 7817
7818 Muirhead	1990 QO	Brian K. Muirhead, flight system manager and deputy project manager of JPL's Mars Pathfinder mission	MPC · 7818
7820 Ianlyon	1990 TU_{8}	Ian Lyon (born 1957), a researcher at the University of Manchester, United Kingdom. He studies the isotopic composition of meteorites to investigate the early Solar System and the origin of interstellar grains. Ian has been an associate editor of Meteoritics and Planetary Science.	JPL · 7820
7824 Lynch	1991 RM_{2}	William Lynch III of the Jet Propulsion Laboratory and an outstanding model of efficiency, friendliness and dedication to his work and responsibilities. He is the epitome of the NASA/JPL motto, "Faster, better and cheaper", in the sense that anyone who works in a highly charged, positive fashion, streamlined for action, leads to a more successful and economical operation. Always with a big smile and a cheerful greeting, he is one of JPL's biggest assets	JPL · 7824
7826 Kinugasa	1991 VO	Sachio Kinugasa (1947–2018), Japanese professional baseball player	MPC · 7826
7828 Noriyositosi	1992 SD_{13}	Noriyosi Furiya (1838–1914), a pioneer Japanese winegrower, and his great-grandson Tosihiko (Tosi) Tukamoto (born 1931). Tosi introduced a sake-brewing technique of low-temperature fermentation to the winemaking world	JPL · 7828
7829 Jaroff	1992 WY_{4}	Leon Jaroff (1927–2012), science journalist with a long, distinctive association with Time magazine. Jaroff is internationally known for his well-researched, insightful articles and essays on scientific subjects combining factual reporting and intelligent commentary. He has won many awards and honors for his fine journalism. Through his writing, he has drawn attention to the issue of NEOs and the potentially catastrophic consequences for our civilization should a large comet or asteroid strike the earth	JPL · 7829
7830 Akihikotago	1993 DC_{1}	Akihiko Tago (born 1932), Japanese amateur astronomer	MPC · 7830
7831 François-Xavier	1993 FQ	François-Xavier Bagnoud (1961–1986), French pilot after whom FXB International is named	MPC · 7831
7833 Nilstamm	1993 FV_{32}	Nils Tamm (1876–1957), Swedish amateur astronomer and artist whose private observatory is now the Kvistabergs Observatorium, an observing station of Uppsala Astronomical Observatory	MPC · 7833
7835 Myroncope	1993 MC	Myron Cope (1929–2008), an American sports journalist	JPL · 7835
7837 Mutsumi	1993 TX	Mutsumi Abe (born 1957), wife of Japanese discoverer Hiroshi Abe	MPC · 7837
7838 Feliceierman	1993 WA	Felice Ierman (1922–1996), father of this minor planet's co-discoverer Giovanni Ierman, was a strong believer in science and technology who inspired his son's passion for astronomy. He also contributed morally and materially to the construction of the first Farra d'Isonzo observatory	JPL · 7838
7840 Hendrika	1994 TL_{3}	Hendrika Cornelia Marshall Aikman (née Grootendorst), wife of the discoverer Christopher Aikman	MPC · 7840
7842 Ishitsuka	1994 XQ	Mutsumi Ishitsuka (born 1930), who has worked in Peru since 1957, making coronagraphic observations of the sun at high altitude. In 1979 he built the Cosmos Observatory and in 1988 set up a new coronagraph there that was destroyed by a group of guerrillas. He is currently trying to reconstruct the observatory and to establish a Peruvian National Observatory for teaching astronomy. Name proposed by the discoverers following a suggestion by T. Kuroda and Y. Yamada	JPL · 7842
7844 Horikawa	1995 YL_{1}	Kuniaki Horikawa (born 1958), a computer systems engineer in Yokohama, started Jupiter observations in 1974, and he has obtained more than 3000 drawings and 8200 central-meridian transit timings. Since 2001 he has served as director of the Jupiter-Saturn Section of the Oriental Astronomical Association	JPL · 7844
7845 Mckim	1996 AC	Richard McKim (born 1958), British astronomer who directed the British Astronomical Association's Mars Section	MPC · 7845
7846 Setvák	1996 BJ	Martin Setvák (born 1958), Czech meteorologist	MPC · 7846
7847 Mattiaorsi	1996 CS_{8}	Mattia Orsi (born 1995), nephew of Arcetri astronomer Giuseppe Forti	JPL · 7847
7848 Bernasconi	1996 DF_{1}	Giovanni Bernasconi (1901–1965) and Angelo Bernasconi (1911–1990), Italian amateur astronomers Src	MPC · 7848
7849 Janjosefrič	1996 HR	Jan Frič (1863–1897) and Josef Frič (1861–1945), Czech amateur astronomers. The two brothers founded the Ondřejov Observatory.	MPC · 7849
7850 Buenos Aires	1996 LH	The Argentine city and capital of Buenos Aires	MPC · 7850
7851 Azumino	1996 YW_{2}	an area in Nagano prefecture, Azumino is the rice field area east of the Japanese Northern Alps. In various places, natural spring water surfaces to form clear mountain streams. Azumino is famous throughout Japan for its beautiful scenery year-round	JPL · 7851
7852 Itsukushima	7604 P-L	Itsukushima Island near Hiroshima City, known as "one of the Scenic Trio of Japan", the island is also called "Miyajima", which means "Shrine Island". The origin of the shrine is not known, but it goes back at least to the sixth century; in the twelfth century its building complex was much enlarged. The shrine and its giant torii gate stand in the sea at high tide. In 1996 the shrine was assigned "World Heritage" recognition by UNESCO. Name proposed by Takeshi Sato	JPL · 7852
7853 Confucius	2086 T-2	Confucius (551–479 BC), Chinese philosopher	MPC · 7853
7854 Laotse	1076 T-3	Lao Zi (601–531 BC), Chinese philosopher	MPC · 7854
7855 Tagore	4092 T-3	Rabindranath Tagore (1861–1941), poet	MPC · 7855
7856 Viktorbykov	1975 VB_{1}	Viktor Leonidovich Bykov (born 1934), a Russian scientist who is known for his work on the theory of satellite communication. He was a designer of the space communication systems "Ekran" and "Intersputnik", as well as of the direct government line between Russia and the U.S. The name was suggested by the Institute of Applied Astronomy	JPL · 7856
7857 Lagerros	1978 QC_{3}	Johan S. V. Lagerros (born 1968), a Swedish astronomer	MPC · 7857
7858 Bolotov	1978 SB_{3}	Andrey Bolotov (1738–1833), Russian writer, scientist, agriculturist, forester and builder of parks	JPL · 7858
7859 Lhasa	1979 US	Lhasa the capital of Tibet	MPC · 7859
7860 Zahnle	1980 PF	Kevin J. Zahnle (born 1955), American space research scientist	JPL · 7860
7861 Messenger	1981 EK_{25}	Scott R. Messenger (born 1969), an American space scientist at NASA's Johnson Space Center. He pioneered research on the identification of pre-solar molecular cloud material in interplanetary dust particles (see below).	JPL · 7861
7862 Keikonakamura	1981 EE_{28}	Keiko Nakamura Messenger (born 1973), Japanese-American space scientist at NASA's Johnson Space Center. Her work revealed the existence of organic globules in the Tagish Lake meteorite, furthering our understanding of organic material in the Solar System (see above).	JPL · 7862
7863 Turnbull	1981 VK	Margaret Turnbull (born 1975), an American astrobiologist	JPL · 7863
7864 Borucki	1982 EE	William Borucki (born 1939) founded and developed the Kepler mission that led to the discovery of numerous exoplanetary systems and to significant contributions to stellar astrophysics and astroseismology of evolving stars. He also determined plasma properties of hypervelocity shock waves that were used in the heat shield of the Apollo missions.	JPL · 7864
7865 Françoisgros	1982 FG_{3}	François Gros (born 1925) is a molecular biologist and permanent secretary emeritus of the French Academy of Sciences. He is honorary professor at the College de France and at the Institut Pasteur. He is the president of COPED, the Committee of Developing Countries of the French Academy of Sciences	JPL · 7865
7866 Sicoli	1982 TK	Piero Sicoli (born 1954), Italian amateur astronomer and discoverer of minor planets	JPL · 7866
7867 Burian	1984 SB_{1}	Zdeněk Burian (1905–1981), Czech artist	MPC · 7867
7868 Barker	1984 UX_{2}	Edwin S. Barker (born 1940), a research scientist at the McDonald Observatory of the University of Texas at Austin	JPL · 7868
7869 Pradun	1987 RV_{3}	Valentin Panteleevich Pradun (born 1956), Ukrainian economist and professor at Tavrichesky National University, president of the Crimean Academy of Humanities	JPL · 7869
7871 Tunder	1990 SW_{4}	Franz Tunder (1614–1667), German organist	MPC · 7871
7873 Böll	1991 AE_{3}	Heinrich Böll (1917–1985), German novelist and recipient of the Nobel Prize for Literature in 1972	MPC · 7873
7881 Schieferdecker	1992 RC_{7}	Johann Christian Schieferdecker (1679–1732), German organist	MPC · 7881
7885 Levine	1993 KQ_{2}	Joanna L. Levine (born 1975), an astrophysicist, ballerina, and a yoga instructor. She attended Walnut Hill School to study ballet, obtained a Ph.D. from the University of Florida concentrating on star formation in Orion, and is currently a professor at Mt. Holyoke College.	JPL · 7885
7886 Redman	1993 PE	Roderick Oliver Redman (1905–1975) and Russell Ormond Redman (born 1951), English and Canadian astronomers, respectively, who worked at the Dominion Astrophysical Observatory during significant parts of their careers	MPC · 7886
7887 Bratfest	1993 SU_{2}	Oktoberfest style gathering hosted by the graduate students of the Lunar and Planetary Laboratory at the University of Arizona	MPC · 7887
7890 Yasuofukui	1994 TC_{3}	Yasuo Fukui (born 1951), professor at Nagoya University and a radio astronomer specializing in molecular clouds and the birth of stars. He established and directs the operation of the "Nanten" millimeter-wavelength radio telescope at the Las Campanas Observatory in Chile. He is a winner of the Vainu Bappu Gold Medal and other prizes. Name proposed by the discoverers following a suggestion by T. Sato and A. Fujii	JPL · 7890
7891 Fuchie	1994 VJ_{7}	the Tokyo Metropolitan Fuchie Senior High School, where the first discoverer teaches astronomy and geology. Fuchie means the bank of a large river. This place has been called Fuchie for nearly a thousand years	JPL · 7891
7892 Musamurahigashi	1994 WQ_{12}	Musashimurayama East High School, Japan	MPC · 7892
7894 Rogers	1994 XC_{1}	John H. Rogers (born 1952), director of the British Astronomical Association's Jupiter section since 1988, received the Association's Goodacre Medal in 2003. He is the author of The Giant Planet Jupiter (Cambridge University Press, 1995). By profession he is a molecular neurobiologist at the University of Cambridge	JPL · 7894
7895 Kaseda	1995 DK_{1}	The Japanese city of Kaseda, now Minamisatsuma, located in the southwest of Kagoshima prefecture, birthplace of astronomer Fumiaki Uto, who discovered this minor planet	JPL · 7895
7896 Švejk	1995 EC	Josef Švejk, fictional character from the novel The Good Soldier Švejk by Jaroslav Hašek	MPC · 7896
7897 Bohuška	1995 EL_{1}	Bohumila Šarounová, mother of Czech discoverer Lenka Kotková (Šarounová)	MPC · 7897
7898 Ohkuma	1995 XR_{1}	Masami Ohkuma (born 1954) is an amateur astronomer who serves as chief editor of the Japanese astronomical monthly magazine Hoshi-Navi. He also plays an important role for the popularization of astronomy in Japan	JPL · 7898
7899 Joya	1996 BV_{3}	Masanori Joya (1940–1967) was an early member of the Japan Lunar and Planetary Observers Network and played a vital role in its early development. He was the first discoverer in Japan of Jupiter's SEB Disturbance in 1962. He died tragically after losing his way in an unexpectedly heavy snowfall on Mt. Asama	JPL · 7899
7900 Portule	1996 CV_{8}	Portule, the highest mountain peak in the Asiago tableland, near the Asiago Astrophysical Observatory. The wild mountain range is a trekking favorite for local astronomers	JPL · 7900

== 7901–8000 ==
back to top

Named minor planet	Provisional	This minor planet was named for...	Ref · Catalog
7901 Konnai	1996 DP	Reiichi Konnai (born 1950; former name Horiguchi), an eagle-eyed observer and dentist	JPL · 7901
7902 Hanff	1996 HT_{17}	Johann Nikolaus Hanff (1663–1711), German organist	MPC · 7902
7903 Albinoni	1996 HV_{24}	Tomaso Albinoni (1671–1751), Italian composer	MPC · 7903
7904 Morrow	1997 JL_{4}	Walter Morrow (1928–2017), American long-time director of the MIT Lincoln Laboratory Src	MPC · 7904
7905 Juzoitami	1997 OX	Juzo Itami (1933–1997), actor, translator, essayist, editor and well-known director since the great success of his first work Osoushiki (Funeral)	JPL · 7905
7906 Melanchton	3081 P-L	Philip Melanchthon (1497–1560), a German reformer	JPL · 7906
7907 Erasmus	4047 P-L	Erasmus (1466–1536), a Dutch humanist. He was the son of a priest and became a priest himself. In 1517 he was released by the pope from his holy vows, becoming an advisor to the emperor Charles V. He published papers critical of the practices of the Church; eventually he became the father of European humanism. He translated the classics, books of the church fathers and the New Testament into Latin in a critical way. His collection of proverbs helped shed new light on ancient literature and influenced religion, art and sciences	JPL · 7907
7908 Zwingli	4192 T-1	Ulrich Zwingli (1484–1531), a Swiss reformer of the church. He was originally a Catholic priest, but under the influence of the books of Erasmus and Luther he felt the need for reform. In 1523 he broke with the bishop, married and became a fervent puritan. For him the holy communion was only a symbolic celebration, and in this respect he did not agree with Luther. Zwingli died in a fight against the catholic cantons as a clergyman of the reformed soldiers.	JPL · 7908
7909 Ziffer	1975 SK	Julie Ziffer (born 1974), a professor of physics at the University of Southern Maine, United States	JPL · 7909
7910 Aleksola	1976 GD_{2}	Aleksandr Anatolievich Solov'ev, Russian (Kalmuk) poet, theoretical astrophysicist and solar physicist	JPL · 7910
7911 Carlpilcher	1977 RZ_{8}	Carl Bernard Pilcher, American astronomer who directs NASA's Solar System Exploration Program. While at M.I.T. and the University of Hawaii, Pilcher studied Jupiter's atmosphere and satellites, especially Io's interaction with Jupiter's magnetosphere, using ground-based telescopes. He has been a member of the imaging team of the Galileo mission to Jupiter since 1977. Pilcher has also studied international relations, sponsored by the MacArthur Foundation, at Princeton's Woodrow Wilson School, and with the skills he acquired worked at the Office of Space Science at NASA headquarters. He undertook strategic planning and other responsibilities at NASA prior to joining the planetary program during a time of unprecedented resurgence of planetary spacecraft launches. Citation written by C. R. Chapman.	JPL · 7911
7912 Lapovok	1978 PO_{3}	Yakov Semenovich Lapovok (born 1932) is a radio engineer and inventor, scientific secretary of the A. S. Popov Museum at St. Petersburg Electrotechnical University	JPL · 7912
7913 Parfenov	1978 TU_{8}	Anatoly Parfyonov (1925–1993), Russian classical wrestler and champion of the Melbourne Olympic games in 1956	JPL · 7913
7915 Halbrook	1979 MA_{6}	Timothy Halbrook (born 1959), American mechanical engineer who received NASA's Exceptional Public Service Medal and Exception Public Achievement Medal. He is the Proposal and Phase B Program Manager of the Lucy mission (Src).	IAU · 7915
7916 Gigiproietti	1981 EN	Gigi Proietti (1940–2020) was an Italian theater actor, comedian, film actor and director, voice actor, singer, artistic director and director of Italian dubbing. He was a great mentor for many young actors. Name suggested by M. Di Martino.	IAU · 7916
7917 Hammergren	1981 EG_{5}	Mark Hammergren (born 1964), an astronomer at the Adler Planetarium in Chicago	JPL · 7917
7918 Berrilli	1981 EJ_{22}	Francesco Berrilli (born 1958), a professor in the Physics Department of the University of Rome Tor Vergata	JPL · 7918
7919 Prime	1981 EZ_{27}	7919, the one-thousandth prime number	JPL · 7919
7921 Huebner	1982 RF	Walter F. Huebner (born 1928), contributor of small bodies studies in general, and to cometary studies in particular	JPL · 7921
7922 Violalaurenti	1983 CO_{3}	Viola Laurenti (born 2015) is the first granddaughter of Mario Di Martino, astronomer at the Turin Astrophysical Observatory and colleague and friend of the discoverers.	JPL · 7922
7923 Chyba	1983 WJ	Christopher Chyba (born 1959), American astrophysicist, astrobiologist, security advisor on nuclear proliferation and arms control	JPL · 7923
7924 Simbirsk	1986 PW_{4}	Simbirsk, a region in Russia, formerly Ulyanovsk	JPL · 7924
7925 Shelus	1986 RX_{2}	Peter J. Shelus (born 1942), a manager of the Lunar and Satellite Laser Ranging Projects at McDonald Observatory since 1982	JPL · 7925
7927 Jamiegilmour	1986 WV_{1}	Jamie Gilmour (born 1964) is an isotope cosmochemist at the University of Manchester (UK). He develops novel instrumentation to study the origin and evolution of meteorites using xenon isotopic signatures.	JPL · 7927
7928 Bijaoui	1986 WM_{5}	Albert Bijaoui, French astronomer, born in Tunisia	JPL · 7928
7931 Kristianpedersen	1988 EB_{1}	Kristian Pedersen (born 1966), Danish astrophysicist, winner of the 2004 Tycho Brahe Gold Medal	JPL · 7931
7932 Plimpton	1989 GP	George Plimpton (1927–2003) was an American author, editor, actor and all-round Renaissance man. As the founding editor of the Paris Review, he fostered the careers of many now-famous writers. A giant in the world of participatory journalism, he chronicled his exploits as an amateur in many fields, especially professional sports	JPL · 7932
7933 Magritte	1989 GP_{4}	René Magritte (1898–1967), Belgian painter and surrealist artist. In the 1930s composed his Magritte dictionary, placing ordinary objects, such as apples, stones and pipes, in a surrealistic context, thereby aiming to surprise and alienate. The philosophy of his work may best be summarized as "creating the unknown with known things". Citation written by K. Leterme at the request of the discoverer.	JPL · 7933
7934 Sinatra	1989 SG_{1}	Frank Sinatra (1915–1998), singer	JPL · 7934
7935 Beppefenoglio	1990 EZ_{5}	Beppe Fenoglio (1922–1963), one of the greatest Italian writers of the twentieth century.	JPL · 7935
7936 Mikemagee	1990 OW_{2}	Michael Magee (born 1958) has had a distinguished career with the University of Arizona's Flandrau Science Center and Planetarium since 1980. Throughout two decades Magee has been largely responsible for the planetarium's production of astronomy shows and its outreach program.	JPL · 7936
7939 Asphaug	1991 AP_{1}	Erik Ian Asphaug (born 1961), a Norwegian American astronomer	JPL · 7939
7940 Erichmeyer	1991 EO_{1}	Erich Meyer (born 1951), an Austrian engineer and amateur astronomer. This minor planet was named on the occasion of his 20th anniversary as an astrometricist. Using a measuring engine he constructed himself, Meyer measured about 250 precise positions of minor planets and comets from photographic plates. Among the 2600 positions he derived after switching to CCD equipment in 1993 are some for the 1997 opposition of this object, thereby rendering it appropriate for numbering. An electrical engineer by profession, Meyer is also a well-known astrophotographer and popularizer of astronomy.	JPL · 7940
7945 Kreisau	1991 RK_{7}	Anti-Nazi resistance group formed in 1942 in Silesia at the Kreisau farm, the family estate of H. J. Graf von Moltke. The members of the group, called Kreisauer Kreis	JPL · 7945
7947 Toland	1992 BE_{2}	John Toland (1670–1722), Irish-born rationalist philosopher and freethinker	MPC · 7947
7948 Whitaker	1992 HY	Ewen Whitaker (1922–2016), a British born planetary scientist and lunar astronomer from the Lunar and Planetary Laboratory at UA	MPC · 7948
7950 Berezov	1992 SS_{26}	Beryozovo, Russian town	JPL · 7950
7953 Kawaguchi	1993 KP	Masaya Kawaguchi (born 1959), a chief editor of the Japanese astronomical magazine Sky Watcher during 1987–2000	JPL · 7953
7954 Kitao	1993 SQ_{2}	Koichi Kitao (born 1953), a Japanese amateur astronomer	JPL · 7954
7955 Ogiwara	1993 WE	Tetsuo Ogiwara (born 1950), a Japanese amateur astronomer	JPL · 7955
7956 Yaji	1993 YH	Kentaro Yaji (born 1966), the director of Kawabe Cosmic Park in Wakayama prefecture	JPL · 7956
7957 Antonella	1994 BT	Antonella Bartolini (born 1956), amateur astronomer and friend of the discoverers	JPL · 7957
7958 Leakey	1994 LE_{3}	Mary Leakey (1913–1996), her husband Louis Leakey (1903–1972), and their son Richard Leakey (born 1944), all major figures in the paleoanthropology of Africa	JPL · 7958
7959 Alysecherri	1994 PK	Alyse Cherri Hergenrother, née Alyse Cherri Smith, wife of the discoverer	JPL · 7959
7960 Condorcet	1994 PW_{16}	Marquis de Condorcet (1743–1794), a French philosopher and mathematician	MPC · 7960
7961 Ercolepoli	1994 TD_{2}	Ercole Poli (1961–2000), Italian amateur astronomer	MPC · 7961
7963 Falcinelli	1995 CA	Amleto Falcinelli (1921–1996), Italian bantam-weight boxing champion	JPL · 7963
7965 Katsuhiko	1996 BD_{1}	Katsuhiko Sato (born 1945), professor at University of Tokyo and director of the Research Center of the Early Universe since 1995	JPL · 7965
7966 Richardbaum	1996 DA	Richard Myer Baum (born 1930), British amateur astronomer and author	JPL · 7966
7967 Beny	1996 DV_{2}	Michal "Beny" Böhm, friend of the discoverer	MPC · 7967
7968 Elst–Pizarro	1996 N2	Eric Walter Elst (born 1936), Belgian astronomer and Guido Pizarro, astronomer at ESO	MPC · 7968
7970 Lichtenberg	6065 P-L	Georg Christoph Lichtenberg (1742–1799), German physicist	JPL · 7970
7971 Meckbach	9002 P-L	Wolfgang Meckbach (1919–1998), microwave spectroscopist	JPL · 7971
7972 Mariotti	1174 T-1	Jean-Marie Mariotti (1955–1998), French astronomer	JPL · 7972
7973 Koppeschaar	1344 T-2	Carl Egon Koppeschaar, Dutch science writer and reporter in the Netherlands. He is internationally known for popularizing astrophysics and space science, for debunking pseudoscience, and for taking action against light pollution. His Moon Handbook: a 21st-Century Travel Guide is a delight.	JPL · 7973
7974 Vermeesch	2218 T-2	Theo Vermeesch (born 1930), former director of the Simon Stevin Popular Observatory at Hoeven in the Netherlands	MPC · 7974
7976 Pinigin	1977 QT_{2}	Gennadii Ivanovich Pinigin (born 1943), Russian astronomer, director of the Nikolaev Astronomical Observatory. A prominent specialist in fundamental astrometry and astronomical instrument-making, he made a valuable contribution to the creation of new types of meridian instruments at the Pulkovo and Nikolaev observatories.	JPL · 7976
7978 Niknesterov	1978 SR_{4}	Nikolaj Semenovich Nesterov (1947–2002), head of the Radioastronomy Department at the Crimean Astrophysical Observatory	JPL · 7978
7979 Pozharskij	1978 SV_{7}	Dmitry Pozharsky (1578–1642), a Russian prince, statesman and soldier	JPL · 7979
7980 Senkevich	1978 TD_{2}	Yurij Aleksandrovich Senkevich (born 1937), a scientist at the Institute of Medical and Biological Problems of the Russian Academy of Sciences	JPL · 7980
7981 Katieoakman	1978 VL_{10}	Katie Oakman (born 1964) American mechanical engineer and Spacecraft Structures and Mechanisms Lead of the Lucy mission. She also oversaw the construction of Lucy's 7.3-meter photovoltaic array.	IAU · 7981
7982 Timmartin	1979 MX_{5}	Timothy A. Martin (born 1963) American mechanical engineer and Propulsion Lead of the Lucy mission.	IAU · 7982
7983 Festin	1980 FY	Leif Festin (born 1967), a Swedish astronomer. This minor planet was named to celebrate the completion of his Ph.D. thesis on the faint end of the luminosity function. He assisted with photometric observations of minor planets while he was working at the Nordic Optical Telescope on La Palma. He is co-author of several publications on lightcurves of minor planets.	JPL · 7983
7984 Marius	1980 SM	Simon Marius (1573–1625), a court astronomer in Ansbach	JPL · 7984
7985 Nedelcu	1981 EK_{10}	Dan Alin Nedelcu (born 1976), a research scientist at the Astronomical Institute of the Romanian Academy	JPL · 7985
7986 Romania	1981 EG_{15}	The country of Romania is located in southeast Europe, with Bucharest as its capital	JPL · 7986
7987 Walshkevin	1981 EV_{22}	Kevin John Walsh (born 1978), a scientist at the Southwest Research Institute of Boulder, CO	JPL · 7987
7988 Pucacco	1981 EX_{30}	Giuseppe Pucacco (born 1956), a researcher in the Physics Department of the University of Rome Tor Vergata	JPL · 7988
7989 Pernadavide	1981 EW_{41}	Davide Perna (born 1979), a postdoctoral fellow at the Istituto Nazionale di Astrofisica Osservatorio Astronomico di Capodimonte, Italy	JPL · 7989
7991 Kaguyahime	1981 UT_{7}	Main female character in old Japanese romance Taketori-monogatari	MPC · 7991
7992 Yozan	1981 WC	Uesugi Yozan (1751–1822), the ninth lord of Yamagata prefecture's Yonezawa Castle, was the greatest ruler of his clan	JPL · 7992
7993 Johnbridges	1982 UD_{2}	John Bridges (born 1966), based at the University of Leicester, is an expert on the mineralogy and petrology of martian meteorites, chondritic meteorites and cometary material returned by the Stardust mission. He has been a participating scientist in Mars Science Laboratory rover mission.	JPL · 7993
7994 Bethellen	1983 CQ_{2}	Beth Ellen Clark (born 1964), an American astronomer †	MPC · 7994
7995 Khvorostovsky	1983 PX	Dmitri Hvorostovsky (1962–2017), a Russian operatic baritone	JPL · 7995
7996 Vedernikov	1983 RX_{3}	Alexander Filipovich Vedernikov (born 1927), Russian bass, father of conductor Alexander Vedernikov (born 1964)	JPL · 7996
7998 Gonczi	1985 JK	Robert Gonczi (born 1945), a French dynamicist	JPL · 7998
7999 Nesvorný	1986 RA_{3}	David Nesvorný (born 1969), a Czech astronomer and dynamicist	JPL · 7999
8000 Isaac Newton	1986 RL_{5}	Isaac Newton (1643–1727), an English mathematician and physicist and one of the most influential scientists ever	JPL · 8000

back to top

Preceded by 6,001–7,000	Meanings of minor-planet names List of minor planets: 7,001–8,000	Succeeded by 8,001–9,000
