= Hergenröther =

Hergenröther is a German surname. Notable people with the surname include:

- Carl W. Hergenrother (born 1973), American astronomer
  - 168P/Hergenrother, a periodic comet in the Solar System
  - 3099 Hergenrother, main-belt asteroid
- Joseph Hergenröther (1824–1890), German church historian and canonist
- Paul J. Hergenrother, American chemist

== See also ==
- Hergenroth
