= 7959 Alysecherri =

Main-belt asteroid

Discovery
- Discovered by: C. W. Hergenrother
- Discovery site: Catalina Stn.
- Discovery date: 2 August 1994

Designations
- Named after: Alyse Cherri Smith (wife of discoverer)
- Alternative designations: 1994 PK
- Minor planet category: main-belt · Hungaria

Orbital characteristics
- Epoch 4 September 2017 (JD 2458000.5)
- Uncertainty parameter 0
- Observation arc: 65.30 yr (23,850 days)
- Aphelion: 2.1094 AU
- Perihelion: 1.7760 AU
- Semi-major axis: 1.9427 AU
- Eccentricity: 0.0858
- Orbital period (sidereal): 2.71 yr (989 days)
- Mean anomaly: 169.49°
- Mean motion: 0° 21^{m} 50.4^{s} / day
- Inclination: 19.263°
- Longitude of ascending node: 235.79°
- Argument of perihelion: 100.40°

Physical characteristics
- Dimensions: 3.05 km (calculated)
- Synodic rotation period: 3.161±0.005 h
- Geometric albedo: 0.30 (assumed)
- Spectral type: E
- Absolute magnitude (H): 14.5 · 15.09±0.63

7959 Alysecherri, provisional designation 1994 PK, is a bright, stony Hungaria asteroid from the inner regions of the asteroid belt, approximately 3 kilometers in diameter. It was discovered on 2 August 1994, by American astronomer Carl Hergenrother at Steward Observatory's Catalina Station on Mt Bigelow near Tucson, Arizona. The asteroid was named for the discoverer's wife, Alyse Cherri.

== Orbit and classification ==
The E-type asteroid is a member of the Hungaria family, which form the innermost dense concentration of asteroids in the Solar System. It orbits the Sun in the inner main-belt at a distance of 1.8–2.1 AU once every 2 years and 9 months (989 days). Its orbit has an eccentricity of 0.09 and an inclination of 19° with respect to the ecliptic. The first precovery was taken at Palomar Observatory in 1951, extending the asteroid's observation arc by 43 years prior to its discovery.

== Physical characteristics ==
A rotational lightcurve for this asteroid was obtained from photometric observations made by American astronomer Brian Warner at the U.S. Palmer Divide Observatory, Colorado, in July 2013. It gave a rotation period of 3.161±0.005 hours with a brightness amplitude of 0.13 in magnitude (U=2). The Collaborative Asteroid Lightcurve Link assumes an albedo of 0.30 and calculates a diameter of 3.05 kilometers with an absolute magnitude of 14.5.

== Naming ==
This minor planet is named after the maiden name of the discovering astronomer's wife, Alyse Cherri Smith. The official naming citation was published by the Minor Planet Center on 13 November 2008 (M.P.C. 64311).
