= Hergenroth =

- Municipality
- Coat of arms

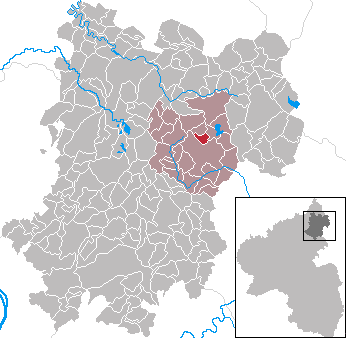
- Location of Hergenroth within Westerwaldkreis district
- Interactive map of Hergenroth
- Location within Germany Location within Rhineland-Palatinate
- Coordinates: 50°34′58″N 7°58′29″E
- Country: Germany
- State: Rhineland-Palatinate
- District: Westerwaldkreis
- Municipal assoc.: Westerburg

Government
  - Mayor (2019–24): Nina Podelski

Area
  - Total: 1.89 km^{2} (0.73 sq mi)
- Elevation: 394 m (1,293 ft)

Population (2025-12-31)
  - Total: 449
  - Density: 238/km^{2} (615/sq mi)
- Time zone: UTC+01:00 (CET)
  - Summer (DST): UTC+02:00 (CEST)
- Postal codes: 56457
- Dialling codes: 02663
- Vehicle registration: WW
- Website: www.westerburger-land.de

Hergenroth is a municipality in Westerwaldkreis district, Rhineland-Palatinate, in western Germany.

People named "Hergenröther" may well have come from this town.

== Transport ==
The former Hergenroth train station

Hergenroth was connected to the Cross Westerwald Railway (Montabaur - Wallmerod - Westerburg - Rennerod - Herborn), but nowadays this line between Montabaur and Wallmerod is only in service for fright trains and from Fehl-Ritzhausen to Rennerod station touristic Railbike tours take place, organized by the interest group IG Westerwald-Querbahn e. V. (IWQ).

Ttoday the nearest accessibility to train service is Westerburg station.

The local bus line 480 runs from Westerburg station via Hergenroth, Pottum, Stahlhofen, Rennerod and Driedorf to the Krombachtalsperre, further local bus lines are 464, 470, 477, 484 and 958.

Hergenroth is located in the transport association Verkehrsverbund Rhein-Mosel (VRM), in the zone number 440.

Hergenroth is located at the Westerwaldsteig, a long distance walking path from Herborn via Rennerod, Westerburg, Bad Marienberg and Hachenburg to Bad Hönningen.
