= List of minor planets: 633001–634000 =

The following is a partial list of minor planets, running from minor-planet number 633001 through 634000, inclusive. The primary data for this and other partial lists is based on JPL's "Small-Body Orbital Elements" and data available from the Minor Planet Center. Critical list information is also provided by the MPC, unless otherwise specified from Lowell Observatory. A detailed description of the table's columns and additional sources are given on the main page including a complete list of every page in this series, and a statistical break-up on the dynamical classification of minor planets.

Also see the summary list of all named bodies in numerical and alphabetical order, and the corresponding naming citations for the number range of this particular list. New namings may only be added to this list after official publication, as the preannouncement of names is condemned by the Working Group for Small Bodies Nomenclature of the International Astronomical Union.

Near-Earth obj.	MBA (inner)	MBA (outer)	Centaur
Mars-crosser	MBA (middle)	Jupiter trojan	Trans-Neptunian obj.
Unclassified

== 633001–633100 ==
Designation			Discovery			Properties		Ref
Permanent	Provisional	Named after	Date	Site	Discoverer(s)	Category	Diam.	Ref
633001	2009 BC_{132}	—	September 10, 2007	Catalina	CSS	·	1.4 km	MPC · JPL
633002	2009 BR_{132}	—	September 12, 2007	Mount Lemmon	Mount Lemmon Survey	·	1.2 km	MPC · JPL
633003	2009 BS_{132}	—	January 30, 2009	Mount Lemmon	Mount Lemmon Survey	·	2.2 km	MPC · JPL
633004	2009 BO_{135}	—	January 1, 2009	Kitt Peak	Spacewatch	·	1.6 km	MPC · JPL
633005	2009 BZ_{135}	—	January 29, 2009	Kitt Peak	Spacewatch	·	3.1 km	MPC · JPL
633006	2009 BW_{136}	—	January 29, 2009	Kitt Peak	Spacewatch	EOS	1.6 km	MPC · JPL
633007	2009 BU_{139}	—	January 15, 2009	Kitt Peak	Spacewatch	·	3.1 km	MPC · JPL
633008	2009 BA_{143}	—	January 30, 2009	Kitt Peak	Spacewatch	THM	2.0 km	MPC · JPL
633009	2009 BS_{151}	—	February 11, 2004	Palomar	NEAT	·	1.9 km	MPC · JPL
633010	2009 BF_{152}	—	January 31, 2009	Mount Lemmon	Mount Lemmon Survey	·	570 m	MPC · JPL
633011	2009 BV_{159}	—	March 26, 2006	Kitt Peak	Spacewatch	·	830 m	MPC · JPL
633012	2009 BG_{160}	—	January 31, 2009	Mount Lemmon	Mount Lemmon Survey	·	1.6 km	MPC · JPL
633013	2009 BL_{161}	—	September 22, 2006	San Marcello	San Marcello	·	3.2 km	MPC · JPL
633014	2009 BB_{163}	—	October 10, 2007	Mount Lemmon	Mount Lemmon Survey	·	2.5 km	MPC · JPL
633015	2009 BG_{163}	—	January 31, 2009	Kitt Peak	Spacewatch	·	2.5 km	MPC · JPL
633016	2009 BC_{180}	—	January 25, 2009	Kitt Peak	Spacewatch	·	3.0 km	MPC · JPL
633017	2009 BM_{180}	—	January 25, 2009	Kitt Peak	Spacewatch	THM	2.1 km	MPC · JPL
633018	2009 BC_{184}	—	September 14, 2007	Catalina	CSS	·	1.9 km	MPC · JPL
633019	2009 BG_{192}	—	October 27, 2008	Mount Lemmon	Mount Lemmon Survey	·	1.8 km	MPC · JPL
633020	2009 BH_{192}	—	August 6, 2014	Haleakala	Pan-STARRS 1	3:2	4.5 km	MPC · JPL
633021	2009 BL_{192}	—	November 16, 2012	Haleakala	Pan-STARRS 1	·	2.9 km	MPC · JPL
633022	2009 BV_{192}	—	September 30, 2007	Kitt Peak	Spacewatch	·	1.3 km	MPC · JPL
633023	2009 BK_{193}	—	January 18, 2009	Kitt Peak	Spacewatch	·	2.9 km	MPC · JPL
633024	2009 BR_{193}	—	January 18, 2015	Haleakala	Pan-STARRS 1	TIR	3.4 km	MPC · JPL
633025	2009 BB_{194}	—	October 9, 2012	Haleakala	Pan-STARRS 1	·	2.8 km	MPC · JPL
633026	2009 BF_{194}	—	January 20, 2009	Mount Lemmon	Mount Lemmon Survey	·	3.8 km	MPC · JPL
633027	2009 BV_{194}	—	January 20, 2009	Catalina	CSS	EUN	1.3 km	MPC · JPL
633028	2009 BG_{195}	—	March 18, 2010	Mount Lemmon	Mount Lemmon Survey	·	2.1 km	MPC · JPL
633029	2009 BF_{196}	—	November 28, 2013	Kitt Peak	Spacewatch	·	2.5 km	MPC · JPL
633030	2009 BZ_{197}	—	June 24, 1995	Kitt Peak	Spacewatch	·	3.0 km	MPC · JPL
633031	2009 BW_{198}	—	January 31, 2009	Mount Lemmon	Mount Lemmon Survey	EOS	1.6 km	MPC · JPL
633032	2009 BY_{198}	—	November 9, 2013	Haleakala	Pan-STARRS 1	EOS	1.7 km	MPC · JPL
633033	2009 BL_{199}	—	August 25, 2012	Haleakala	Pan-STARRS 1	LIX	2.9 km	MPC · JPL
633034	2009 BW_{199}	—	January 7, 2014	Mount Lemmon	Mount Lemmon Survey	VER	2.5 km	MPC · JPL
633035	2009 BM_{200}	—	June 15, 2012	Kitt Peak	Spacewatch	·	2.1 km	MPC · JPL
633036	2009 BP_{201}	—	January 16, 2009	Mount Lemmon	Mount Lemmon Survey	·	2.2 km	MPC · JPL
633037	2009 BZ_{202}	—	March 25, 2015	Haleakala	Pan-STARRS 1	·	1.9 km	MPC · JPL
633038	2009 BU_{203}	—	January 20, 2009	Mount Lemmon	Mount Lemmon Survey	·	2.7 km	MPC · JPL
633039	2009 BN_{205}	—	January 18, 2009	Kitt Peak	Spacewatch	·	2.2 km	MPC · JPL
633040	2009 BO_{205}	—	January 16, 2009	Kitt Peak	Spacewatch	·	2.4 km	MPC · JPL
633041	2009 BQ_{205}	—	September 2, 2002	Kitt Peak	Spacewatch	·	1.2 km	MPC · JPL
633042	2009 BS_{205}	—	January 18, 2009	Kitt Peak	Spacewatch	·	2.4 km	MPC · JPL
633043	2009 BW_{205}	—	January 31, 2009	Kitt Peak	Spacewatch	·	2.2 km	MPC · JPL
633044	2009 BJ_{208}	—	January 29, 2009	Mount Lemmon	Mount Lemmon Survey	EOS	1.6 km	MPC · JPL
633045	2009 BR_{208}	—	January 25, 2009	Kitt Peak	Spacewatch	·	2.1 km	MPC · JPL
633046	2009 BT_{208}	—	January 17, 2009	Mount Lemmon	Mount Lemmon Survey	TEL	1.2 km	MPC · JPL
633047	2009 BV_{208}	—	January 31, 2009	Mount Lemmon	Mount Lemmon Survey	·	2.0 km	MPC · JPL
633048	2009 BO_{210}	—	January 31, 2009	Mount Lemmon	Mount Lemmon Survey	·	2.7 km	MPC · JPL
633049	2009 BW_{211}	—	January 16, 2009	Kitt Peak	Spacewatch	·	2.9 km	MPC · JPL
633050	2009 BX_{211}	—	January 25, 2009	Kitt Peak	Spacewatch	·	1.0 km	MPC · JPL
633051	2009 BE_{212}	—	January 19, 2009	Mount Lemmon	Mount Lemmon Survey	·	2.8 km	MPC · JPL
633052	2009 BQ_{215}	—	January 20, 2009	Mount Lemmon	Mount Lemmon Survey	·	1.9 km	MPC · JPL
633053	2009 BC_{218}	—	January 17, 2009	Kitt Peak	Spacewatch	·	2.5 km	MPC · JPL
633054	2009 CB	—	February 1, 2009	Wrightwood	J. W. Young	ADE	2.1 km	MPC · JPL
633055	2009 CJ_{5}	—	May 1, 2006	Kitt Peak	Spacewatch	·	930 m	MPC · JPL
633056	2009 CB_{6}	—	January 3, 2009	Kitt Peak	Spacewatch	·	1.4 km	MPC · JPL
633057	2009 CD_{9}	—	February 1, 2009	Mount Lemmon	Mount Lemmon Survey	·	2.1 km	MPC · JPL
633058	2009 CH_{10}	—	February 1, 2009	Mount Lemmon	Mount Lemmon Survey	·	1.2 km	MPC · JPL
633059	2009 CA_{11}	—	February 1, 2009	Mount Lemmon	Mount Lemmon Survey	EOS	1.7 km	MPC · JPL
633060	2009 CM_{12}	—	February 2, 2009	Kitt Peak	Spacewatch	EOS	1.6 km	MPC · JPL
633061	2009 CD_{17}	—	February 1, 2009	Mount Lemmon	Mount Lemmon Survey	EOS	1.4 km	MPC · JPL
633062	2009 CY_{17}	—	October 30, 2007	Mount Lemmon	Mount Lemmon Survey	·	2.5 km	MPC · JPL
633063	2009 CQ_{19}	—	February 3, 2009	Mount Lemmon	Mount Lemmon Survey	VER	2.5 km	MPC · JPL
633064	2009 CN_{20}	—	February 1, 2009	Kitt Peak	Spacewatch	·	2.2 km	MPC · JPL
633065	2009 CR_{25}	—	February 1, 2009	Kitt Peak	Spacewatch	·	2.5 km	MPC · JPL
633066	2009 CV_{33}	—	February 2, 2009	Kitt Peak	Spacewatch	VER	2.2 km	MPC · JPL
633067	2009 CM_{34}	—	January 17, 2009	Kitt Peak	Spacewatch	·	2.8 km	MPC · JPL
633068	2009 CO_{35}	—	December 29, 2008	Mount Lemmon	Mount Lemmon Survey	·	780 m	MPC · JPL
633069	2009 CZ_{42}	—	October 20, 2007	Mount Lemmon	Mount Lemmon Survey	·	2.8 km	MPC · JPL
633070	2009 CU_{52}	—	January 25, 2009	Kitt Peak	Spacewatch	·	2.1 km	MPC · JPL
633071	2009 CP_{54}	—	October 11, 2007	Lulin	LUSS	·	2.7 km	MPC · JPL
633072	2009 CR_{54}	—	February 2, 2009	Kitt Peak	Spacewatch	·	530 m	MPC · JPL
633073	2009 CS_{60}	—	February 5, 2009	Kitt Peak	Spacewatch	VER	2.6 km	MPC · JPL
633074	2009 CW_{67}	—	February 18, 2015	Haleakala	Pan-STARRS 1	·	3.5 km	MPC · JPL
633075	2009 CC_{69}	—	February 2, 2009	Kitt Peak	Spacewatch	·	2.5 km	MPC · JPL
633076	2009 CG_{71}	—	February 15, 2015	Haleakala	Pan-STARRS 1	·	2.6 km	MPC · JPL
633077	2009 CJ_{71}	—	February 22, 1998	Kitt Peak	Spacewatch	·	2.9 km	MPC · JPL
633078	2009 CW_{71}	—	February 3, 2009	Mount Lemmon	Mount Lemmon Survey	EOS	1.5 km	MPC · JPL
633079	2009 CM_{73}	—	February 19, 2015	Haleakala	Pan-STARRS 1	·	2.8 km	MPC · JPL
633080	2009 CX_{74}	—	January 5, 2003	Kitt Peak	Spacewatch	·	4.0 km	MPC · JPL
633081	2009 CG_{75}	—	February 1, 2009	Kitt Peak	Spacewatch	·	2.7 km	MPC · JPL
633082	2009 CJ_{75}	—	December 29, 2008	Mount Lemmon	Mount Lemmon Survey	EOS	1.6 km	MPC · JPL
633083	2009 CL_{75}	—	February 1, 2009	Kitt Peak	Spacewatch	·	2.1 km	MPC · JPL
633084	2009 CR_{75}	—	February 2, 2009	Kitt Peak	Spacewatch	·	2.0 km	MPC · JPL
633085	2009 CP_{76}	—	February 3, 2009	Mount Lemmon	Mount Lemmon Survey	·	910 m	MPC · JPL
633086	2009 CV_{76}	—	February 3, 2009	Mount Lemmon	Mount Lemmon Survey	EOS	1.4 km	MPC · JPL
633087	2009 CN_{77}	—	February 4, 2009	Mount Lemmon	Mount Lemmon Survey	·	1.7 km	MPC · JPL
633088	2009 DX_{4}	—	February 3, 2009	Kitt Peak	Spacewatch	·	3.2 km	MPC · JPL
633089	2009 DA_{5}	—	August 27, 2006	Kitt Peak	Spacewatch	·	2.5 km	MPC · JPL
633090	2009 DE_{5}	—	October 2, 2006	Mount Lemmon	Mount Lemmon Survey	·	2.8 km	MPC · JPL
633091	2009 DF_{6}	—	February 17, 2009	Kitt Peak	Spacewatch	·	2.0 km	MPC · JPL
633092	2009 DN_{12}	—	February 16, 2009	Kitt Peak	Spacewatch	·	3.0 km	MPC · JPL
633093	2009 DH_{19}	—	February 20, 2009	Kitt Peak	Spacewatch	·	2.0 km	MPC · JPL
633094	2009 DV_{25}	—	February 21, 2009	Mount Lemmon	Mount Lemmon Survey	HOF	2.5 km	MPC · JPL
633095	2009 DL_{28}	—	February 23, 2009	Calar Alto	F. Hormuth	·	1.1 km	MPC · JPL
633096	2009 DO_{30}	—	February 23, 2009	Calar Alto	F. Hormuth	·	1.1 km	MPC · JPL
633097	2009 DY_{31}	—	November 3, 2007	Kitt Peak	Spacewatch	·	1.0 km	MPC · JPL
633098	2009 DK_{40}	—	January 29, 2009	Mount Lemmon	Mount Lemmon Survey	·	1.4 km	MPC · JPL
633099	2009 DA_{44}	—	January 31, 2009	Kitt Peak	Spacewatch	VER	2.4 km	MPC · JPL
633100	2009 DL_{45}	—	February 26, 2009	Socorro	LINEAR	·	1.3 km	MPC · JPL

== 633101–633200 ==
back to top

Designation			Discovery			Properties		Ref
Permanent	Provisional	Named after	Date	Site	Discoverer(s)	Category	Diam.	Ref
633101	2009 DJ_{51}	—	November 8, 2007	Kitt Peak	Spacewatch	·	1.3 km	MPC · JPL
633102	2009 DW_{58}	—	February 22, 2009	Kitt Peak	Spacewatch	·	820 m	MPC · JPL
633103	2009 DG_{59}	—	February 22, 2009	Kitt Peak	Spacewatch	·	1.1 km	MPC · JPL
633104	2009 DE_{60}	—	February 22, 2009	Kitt Peak	Spacewatch	HYG	2.1 km	MPC · JPL
633105	2009 DE_{61}	—	February 22, 2009	Kitt Peak	Spacewatch	·	2.5 km	MPC · JPL
633106	2009 DN_{62}	—	February 9, 2005	Kitt Peak	Spacewatch	·	1.1 km	MPC · JPL
633107	2009 DZ_{64}	—	January 29, 2009	Kitt Peak	Spacewatch	·	870 m	MPC · JPL
633108	2009 DB_{67}	—	September 26, 2006	Molėtai	K. Černis, J. Zdanavičius	·	3.1 km	MPC · JPL
633109	2009 DM_{68}	—	October 31, 2008	Mount Lemmon	Mount Lemmon Survey	NYS	1.1 km	MPC · JPL
633110	2009 DB_{69}	—	February 26, 2009	Mount Lemmon	Mount Lemmon Survey	·	2.2 km	MPC · JPL
633111	2009 DJ_{70}	—	October 11, 2007	Mount Lemmon	Mount Lemmon Survey	·	490 m	MPC · JPL
633112	2009 DV_{72}	—	February 4, 2009	Mount Lemmon	Mount Lemmon Survey	·	1.0 km	MPC · JPL
633113	2009 DX_{78}	—	October 18, 2007	Kitt Peak	Spacewatch	·	2.0 km	MPC · JPL
633114	2009 DN_{79}	—	February 21, 2009	Kitt Peak	Spacewatch	·	3.4 km	MPC · JPL
633115	2009 DY_{83}	—	February 26, 2009	Kitt Peak	Spacewatch	·	2.6 km	MPC · JPL
633116	2009 DA_{87}	—	January 31, 2009	Mount Lemmon	Mount Lemmon Survey	·	2.8 km	MPC · JPL
633117	2009 DF_{87}	—	February 27, 2009	Kitt Peak	Spacewatch	·	2.7 km	MPC · JPL
633118	2009 DK_{88}	—	February 22, 2009	Kitt Peak	Spacewatch	VER	2.1 km	MPC · JPL
633119	2009 DK_{92}	—	February 28, 2009	Kitt Peak	Spacewatch	·	2.6 km	MPC · JPL
633120	2009 DB_{94}	—	October 20, 2006	Kitt Peak	Spacewatch	·	3.2 km	MPC · JPL
633121	2009 DW_{102}	—	November 5, 2007	Kitt Peak	Spacewatch	·	770 m	MPC · JPL
633122	2009 DQ_{103}	—	November 13, 2006	Mount Lemmon	Mount Lemmon Survey	THM	2.3 km	MPC · JPL
633123	2009 DR_{104}	—	October 1, 2005	Mount Lemmon	Mount Lemmon Survey	·	3.0 km	MPC · JPL
633124	2009 DX_{106}	—	October 30, 2007	Kitt Peak	Spacewatch	·	3.1 km	MPC · JPL
633125	2009 DT_{111}	—	February 26, 2009	Calar Alto	F. Hormuth	·	2.8 km	MPC · JPL
633126	2009 DB_{112}	—	February 26, 2009	Calar Alto	F. Hormuth	(8737)	2.4 km	MPC · JPL
633127	2009 DZ_{117}	—	August 19, 2006	Kitt Peak	Spacewatch	·	1.7 km	MPC · JPL
633128	2009 DG_{118}	—	January 3, 2009	Mount Lemmon	Mount Lemmon Survey	·	2.6 km	MPC · JPL
633129	2009 DR_{119}	—	February 27, 2009	Kitt Peak	Spacewatch	·	1.7 km	MPC · JPL
633130	2009 DX_{119}	—	November 5, 1996	Kitt Peak	Spacewatch	·	2.0 km	MPC · JPL
633131	2009 DF_{122}	—	October 23, 2004	Kitt Peak	Spacewatch	·	600 m	MPC · JPL
633132	2009 DP_{122}	—	February 19, 2009	Kitt Peak	Spacewatch	·	1.5 km	MPC · JPL
633133	2009 DU_{122}	—	February 27, 2009	Kitt Peak	Spacewatch	·	2.1 km	MPC · JPL
633134	2009 DX_{125}	—	February 19, 2009	Kitt Peak	Spacewatch	·	3.1 km	MPC · JPL
633135	2009 DT_{139}	—	November 19, 2007	Catalina	CSS	EOS	2.4 km	MPC · JPL
633136	2009 DO_{145}	—	February 26, 2009	Kitt Peak	Spacewatch	·	1.2 km	MPC · JPL
633137	2009 DH_{146}	—	February 26, 2009	Kitt Peak	Spacewatch	·	540 m	MPC · JPL
633138	2009 DZ_{146}	—	February 18, 2015	Haleakala	Pan-STARRS 1	·	2.6 km	MPC · JPL
633139	2009 DD_{147}	—	February 28, 2009	Mount Lemmon	Mount Lemmon Survey	VER	2.2 km	MPC · JPL
633140	2009 DE_{147}	—	February 27, 2009	Catalina	CSS	·	1.0 km	MPC · JPL
633141	2009 DK_{147}	—	February 22, 2009	Mount Lemmon	Mount Lemmon Survey	EOS	1.7 km	MPC · JPL
633142	2009 DO_{147}	—	May 25, 2014	Haleakala	Pan-STARRS 1	·	1.8 km	MPC · JPL
633143	2009 DJ_{148}	—	February 20, 2009	Kitt Peak	Spacewatch	·	2.5 km	MPC · JPL
633144	2009 DO_{148}	—	February 16, 2015	Haleakala	Pan-STARRS 1	·	2.3 km	MPC · JPL
633145	2009 DZ_{148}	—	January 31, 2003	Palomar	NEAT	·	2.8 km	MPC · JPL
633146	2009 DL_{150}	—	May 31, 2014	Haleakala	Pan-STARRS 1	·	940 m	MPC · JPL
633147	2009 DE_{151}	—	July 23, 2015	Haleakala	Pan-STARRS 1	·	1.1 km	MPC · JPL
633148	2009 DR_{153}	—	February 21, 2009	Mount Lemmon	Mount Lemmon Survey	·	2.3 km	MPC · JPL
633149	2009 DD_{155}	—	February 26, 2009	Kitt Peak	Spacewatch	·	1.6 km	MPC · JPL
633150	2009 DJ_{157}	—	February 28, 2009	Kitt Peak	Spacewatch	·	510 m	MPC · JPL
633151	2009 DX_{157}	—	February 21, 2009	Kitt Peak	Spacewatch	·	3.1 km	MPC · JPL
633152	2009 DO_{158}	—	February 22, 2009	Kitt Peak	Spacewatch	·	2.3 km	MPC · JPL
633153	2009 DE_{160}	—	February 28, 2009	Kitt Peak	Spacewatch	·	2.0 km	MPC · JPL
633154	2009 ET_{9}	—	July 19, 2006	Lulin	LUSS	·	1.1 km	MPC · JPL
633155	2009 ED_{11}	—	January 29, 2009	Mount Lemmon	Mount Lemmon Survey	·	3.3 km	MPC · JPL
633156	2009 EM_{17}	—	February 28, 2009	Kitt Peak	Spacewatch	URS	4.0 km	MPC · JPL
633157	2009 EZ_{23}	—	June 15, 2010	Mount Lemmon	Mount Lemmon Survey	·	590 m	MPC · JPL
633158	2009 EN_{27}	—	January 18, 2008	Mount Lemmon	Mount Lemmon Survey	·	2.5 km	MPC · JPL
633159	2009 EQ_{29}	—	August 30, 2002	Kitt Peak	Spacewatch	·	1.2 km	MPC · JPL
633160	2009 EW_{31}	—	November 8, 2007	Mount Lemmon	Mount Lemmon Survey	·	2.4 km	MPC · JPL
633161	2009 EX_{32}	—	May 12, 2011	Mount Lemmon	Mount Lemmon Survey	TIR	3.0 km	MPC · JPL
633162	2009 EN_{41}	—	March 1, 2009	Mount Lemmon	Mount Lemmon Survey	·	930 m	MPC · JPL
633163	2009 ET_{42}	—	March 2, 2009	Mount Lemmon	Mount Lemmon Survey	·	1.3 km	MPC · JPL
633164	2009 FF_{2}	—	September 11, 2001	Kitt Peak	Spacewatch	·	2.5 km	MPC · JPL
633165	2009 FN_{11}	—	March 17, 2009	Kitt Peak	Spacewatch	(5)	1.1 km	MPC · JPL
633166	2009 FM_{18}	—	April 30, 2005	Kitt Peak	Spacewatch	EUN	1.2 km	MPC · JPL
633167	2009 FH_{20}	—	December 5, 2007	Kitt Peak	Spacewatch	·	2.7 km	MPC · JPL
633168	2009 FP_{20}	—	March 18, 2009	Bergisch Gladbach	W. Bickel	·	1.5 km	MPC · JPL
633169	2009 FJ_{38}	—	March 26, 2009	Kitt Peak	Spacewatch	HNS	960 m	MPC · JPL
633170	2009 FM_{48}	—	May 9, 2006	Mount Lemmon	Mount Lemmon Survey	·	760 m	MPC · JPL
633171	2009 FG_{50}	—	February 1, 2009	Mount Lemmon	Mount Lemmon Survey	·	3.0 km	MPC · JPL
633172	2009 FV_{51}	—	March 1, 2009	Kitt Peak	Spacewatch	·	2.6 km	MPC · JPL
633173	2009 FQ_{66}	—	May 3, 2005	Kitt Peak	Spacewatch	·	1.2 km	MPC · JPL
633174	2009 FE_{69}	—	March 16, 2009	Kitt Peak	Spacewatch	·	1.2 km	MPC · JPL
633175	2009 FS_{74}	—	October 20, 1998	Kitt Peak	Spacewatch	·	2.4 km	MPC · JPL
633176	2009 FR_{77}	—	January 12, 2003	Palomar	NEAT	EUP	3.9 km	MPC · JPL
633177	2009 FP_{79}	—	May 30, 2006	Mount Lemmon	Mount Lemmon Survey	·	620 m	MPC · JPL
633178	2009 FN_{81}	—	March 25, 2009	XuYi	PMO NEO Survey Program	·	900 m	MPC · JPL
633179	2009 FO_{81}	—	April 14, 2005	Catalina	CSS	BAR	1.1 km	MPC · JPL
633180	2009 FQ_{81}	—	March 31, 2009	Mount Lemmon	Mount Lemmon Survey	·	1.4 km	MPC · JPL
633181	2009 FZ_{81}	—	September 16, 2010	Catalina	CSS	·	650 m	MPC · JPL
633182	2009 FH_{82}	—	November 7, 2012	Haleakala	Pan-STARRS 1	·	2.2 km	MPC · JPL
633183	2009 FM_{83}	—	March 31, 2009	Kitt Peak	Spacewatch	·	2.7 km	MPC · JPL
633184	2009 FW_{83}	—	June 5, 2016	Haleakala	Pan-STARRS 1	·	2.8 km	MPC · JPL
633185	2009 FM_{86}	—	February 24, 2009	Kitt Peak	Spacewatch	·	2.4 km	MPC · JPL
633186	2009 FZ_{86}	—	September 16, 2017	Haleakala	Pan-STARRS 1	·	2.2 km	MPC · JPL
633187	2009 FX_{89}	—	March 16, 2009	Mount Lemmon	Mount Lemmon Survey	·	950 m	MPC · JPL
633188	2009 FA_{90}	—	March 29, 2009	Kitt Peak	Spacewatch	·	720 m	MPC · JPL
633189	2009 FB_{90}	—	March 19, 2009	Mount Lemmon	Mount Lemmon Survey	·	700 m	MPC · JPL
633190	2009 FO_{95}	—	March 22, 2009	Mount Lemmon	Mount Lemmon Survey	·	1.0 km	MPC · JPL
633191	2009 GB	—	December 30, 2003	Nashville	Clingan, R.	·	1.6 km	MPC · JPL
633192	2009 GD	—	April 1, 2009	Kitt Peak	Spacewatch	·	1.6 km	MPC · JPL
633193	2009 GV	—	April 3, 2009	Cerro Burek	Burek, Cerro	L5	8.3 km	MPC · JPL
633194	2009 GU_{3}	—	December 31, 2008	Kitt Peak	Spacewatch	·	1.5 km	MPC · JPL
633195	2009 GU_{4}	—	April 4, 2009	Cerro Burek	Burek, Cerro	EUN	1.3 km	MPC · JPL
633196	2009 GN_{7}	—	January 5, 2014	Haleakala	Pan-STARRS 1	·	2.2 km	MPC · JPL
633197	2009 GV_{7}	—	March 7, 2009	Mount Lemmon	Mount Lemmon Survey	·	2.3 km	MPC · JPL
633198	2009 GZ_{8}	—	April 2, 2009	Kitt Peak	Spacewatch	THM	2.4 km	MPC · JPL
633199	2009 GQ_{9}	—	April 1, 2009	Mount Lemmon	Mount Lemmon Survey	·	1.7 km	MPC · JPL
633200	2009 HF_{9}	—	January 18, 2008	Kitt Peak	Spacewatch	ADE	1.8 km	MPC · JPL

== 633201–633300 ==
back to top

Designation			Discovery			Properties		Ref
Permanent	Provisional	Named after	Date	Site	Discoverer(s)	Category	Diam.	Ref
633201	2009 HP_{13}	—	April 17, 2009	Catalina	CSS	·	1.3 km	MPC · JPL
633202	2009 HX_{14}	—	April 1, 2009	Kitt Peak	Spacewatch	BRG	1.4 km	MPC · JPL
633203	2009 HC_{17}	—	March 18, 2009	Kitt Peak	Spacewatch	EOS	1.7 km	MPC · JPL
633204	2009 HK_{21}	—	March 21, 2009	Kitt Peak	Spacewatch	·	730 m	MPC · JPL
633205	2009 HS_{23}	—	April 17, 2009	Mount Lemmon	Mount Lemmon Survey	·	490 m	MPC · JPL
633206	2009 HF_{32}	—	April 19, 2009	Kitt Peak	Spacewatch	AGN	1.1 km	MPC · JPL
633207	2009 HB_{33}	—	April 19, 2009	Kitt Peak	Spacewatch	·	1.1 km	MPC · JPL
633208	2009 HF_{35}	—	April 20, 2009	Mount Lemmon	Mount Lemmon Survey	·	2.6 km	MPC · JPL
633209	2009 HQ_{37}	—	March 28, 2009	Mount Lemmon	Mount Lemmon Survey	·	2.0 km	MPC · JPL
633210	2009 HV_{41}	—	April 20, 2009	Kitt Peak	Spacewatch	·	1.3 km	MPC · JPL
633211	2009 HU_{42}	—	October 27, 2005	Kitt Peak	Spacewatch	·	3.0 km	MPC · JPL
633212	2009 HX_{43}	—	March 18, 2009	Kitt Peak	Spacewatch	·	2.7 km	MPC · JPL
633213	2009 HB_{45}	—	September 30, 2006	Mount Lemmon	Mount Lemmon Survey	·	3.3 km	MPC · JPL
633214	2009 HS_{46}	—	May 7, 2006	Mount Lemmon	Mount Lemmon Survey	·	590 m	MPC · JPL
633215	2009 HU_{46}	—	May 8, 2005	Kitt Peak	Spacewatch	·	1.3 km	MPC · JPL
633216	2009 HG_{49}	—	August 29, 2006	Kitt Peak	Spacewatch	·	1.6 km	MPC · JPL
633217	2009 HS_{49}	—	March 7, 2003	Apache Point	SDSS Collaboration	·	3.2 km	MPC · JPL
633218	2009 HU_{49}	—	April 2, 2009	Mount Lemmon	Mount Lemmon Survey	·	1.0 km	MPC · JPL
633219	2009 HN_{50}	—	April 21, 2009	Kitt Peak	Spacewatch	MAR	880 m	MPC · JPL
633220	2009 HS_{50}	—	April 21, 2009	Mount Lemmon	Mount Lemmon Survey	·	1.4 km	MPC · JPL
633221	2009 HM_{52}	—	April 17, 2009	Catalina	CSS	·	650 m	MPC · JPL
633222	2009 HY_{53}	—	September 25, 2006	Kitt Peak	Spacewatch	MAR	980 m	MPC · JPL
633223	2009 HA_{54}	—	March 12, 2002	Kitt Peak	Spacewatch	·	4.9 km	MPC · JPL
633224	2009 HA_{57}	—	September 21, 2001	Apache Point	SDSS Collaboration	·	1.5 km	MPC · JPL
633225 Daukša	2009 HB_{59}	Daukša	April 18, 2009	Baldone	K. Černis, I. Eglītis	·	1.2 km	MPC · JPL
633226	2009 HC_{59}	—	March 18, 2009	Kitt Peak	Spacewatch	·	760 m	MPC · JPL
633227	2009 HF_{62}	—	April 21, 2009	Kitt Peak	Spacewatch	·	2.5 km	MPC · JPL
633228	2009 HY_{66}	—	April 6, 2005	Mount Lemmon	Mount Lemmon Survey	·	820 m	MPC · JPL
633229	2009 HE_{67}	—	February 4, 2009	Mount Lemmon	Mount Lemmon Survey	MAS	680 m	MPC · JPL
633230	2009 HQ_{67}	—	April 17, 2009	Sierra Stars	Nicholson, M.	·	650 m	MPC · JPL
633231	2009 HK_{69}	—	April 2, 2009	Kitt Peak	Spacewatch	·	2.8 km	MPC · JPL
633232	2009 HW_{70}	—	September 17, 2006	Kitt Peak	Spacewatch	TIR	3.6 km	MPC · JPL
633233	2009 HF_{76}	—	October 1, 2000	Socorro	LINEAR	·	790 m	MPC · JPL
633234	2009 HP_{77}	—	April 18, 2009	Catalina	CSS	·	1.8 km	MPC · JPL
633235	2009 HR_{78}	—	March 28, 2009	Kitt Peak	Spacewatch	·	670 m	MPC · JPL
633236	2009 HY_{78}	—	March 11, 2005	Kitt Peak	Deep Ecliptic Survey	NYS	960 m	MPC · JPL
633237	2009 HX_{82}	—	February 25, 2003	Campo Imperatore	CINEOS	THM	2.2 km	MPC · JPL
633238	2009 HT_{85}	—	April 7, 2005	Mount Lemmon	Mount Lemmon Survey	·	1.4 km	MPC · JPL
633239	2009 HY_{89}	—	April 1, 2013	Mount Lemmon	Mount Lemmon Survey	·	980 m	MPC · JPL
633240	2009 HW_{90}	—	March 24, 2009	Kitt Peak	Spacewatch	·	590 m	MPC · JPL
633241	2009 HC_{95}	—	April 29, 2009	Cerro Burek	Burek, Cerro	·	2.7 km	MPC · JPL
633242	2009 HG_{95}	—	April 30, 2009	Cerro Burek	Burek, Cerro	·	750 m	MPC · JPL
633243	2009 HZ_{96}	—	April 23, 2009	Catalina	CSS	EUP	3.5 km	MPC · JPL
633244	2009 HJ_{97}	—	March 19, 2009	Mount Lemmon	Mount Lemmon Survey	·	1.3 km	MPC · JPL
633245	2009 HS_{97}	—	April 18, 2009	Mount Lemmon	Mount Lemmon Survey	THM	1.8 km	MPC · JPL
633246	2009 HL_{98}	—	April 18, 2009	Kitt Peak	Spacewatch	·	950 m	MPC · JPL
633247	2009 HS_{101}	—	April 30, 2009	Mount Lemmon	Mount Lemmon Survey	·	540 m	MPC · JPL
633248	2009 HH_{106}	—	April 18, 2009	Kitt Peak	Spacewatch	·	2.8 km	MPC · JPL
633249	2009 HL_{106}	—	October 28, 2006	Catalina	CSS	EUP	3.5 km	MPC · JPL
633250	2009 HT_{110}	—	November 14, 2006	Mount Lemmon	Mount Lemmon Survey	VER	2.6 km	MPC · JPL
633251	2009 HD_{111}	—	September 26, 2011	Mayhill-ISON	L. Elenin	HYG	2.6 km	MPC · JPL
633252	2009 HH_{111}	—	April 21, 2009	Kitt Peak	Spacewatch	L5	10 km	MPC · JPL
633253	2009 HU_{111}	—	January 4, 2012	Kitt Peak	Spacewatch	·	720 m	MPC · JPL
633254	2009 HP_{113}	—	November 24, 2011	Haleakala	Pan-STARRS 1	VER	2.6 km	MPC · JPL
633255	2009 HF_{116}	—	November 6, 2010	Mount Lemmon	Mount Lemmon Survey	·	500 m	MPC · JPL
633256	2009 HJ_{121}	—	April 18, 2009	Kitt Peak	Spacewatch	·	2.1 km	MPC · JPL
633257	2009 JS_{3}	—	May 13, 2009	Catalina	CSS	JUN	1.1 km	MPC · JPL
633258	2009 JT_{4}	—	December 18, 1995	Kitt Peak	Spacewatch	LUT	4.6 km	MPC · JPL
633259	2009 JP_{15}	—	September 14, 2006	Kitt Peak	Spacewatch	HNS	1.2 km	MPC · JPL
633260	2009 JN_{19}	—	January 13, 2008	Mount Lemmon	Mount Lemmon Survey	·	1.4 km	MPC · JPL
633261	2009 JG_{23}	—	May 15, 2009	Mount Lemmon	Mount Lemmon Survey	L5	7.8 km	MPC · JPL
633262	2009 JU_{23}	—	May 13, 2009	Kitt Peak	Spacewatch	·	1.1 km	MPC · JPL
633263	2009 KQ	—	August 19, 2006	Anderson Mesa	LONEOS	·	990 m	MPC · JPL
633264	2009 KX_{5}	—	April 30, 2009	Kitt Peak	Spacewatch	·	650 m	MPC · JPL
633265	2009 KV_{11}	—	May 25, 2009	Kitt Peak	Spacewatch	·	1.9 km	MPC · JPL
633266	2009 KX_{12}	—	September 16, 1998	Kitt Peak	Spacewatch	·	1.1 km	MPC · JPL
633267	2009 KM_{15}	—	September 15, 2006	Kitt Peak	Spacewatch	·	1.1 km	MPC · JPL
633268	2009 KF_{17}	—	May 1, 2009	Kitt Peak	Spacewatch	·	1.6 km	MPC · JPL
633269	2009 KV_{25}	—	November 18, 2006	Kitt Peak	Spacewatch	·	1.8 km	MPC · JPL
633270	2009 KU_{27}	—	May 30, 2009	Mount Lemmon	Mount Lemmon Survey	·	1.3 km	MPC · JPL
633271	2009 KZ_{28}	—	May 31, 2009	Cerro Burek	Burek, Cerro	·	1.4 km	MPC · JPL
633272	2009 KS_{29}	—	October 22, 2006	Palomar	NEAT	·	680 m	MPC · JPL
633273	2009 KS_{38}	—	May 16, 2013	Haleakala	Pan-STARRS 1	·	1.5 km	MPC · JPL
633274	2009 KT_{38}	—	September 24, 2011	Haleakala	Pan-STARRS 1	·	2.7 km	MPC · JPL
633275	2009 KD_{39}	—	September 6, 2013	Mount Lemmon	Mount Lemmon Survey	L5	6.7 km	MPC · JPL
633276	2009 KS_{39}	—	September 28, 2013	Catalina	CSS	·	650 m	MPC · JPL
633277	2009 KO_{42}	—	May 27, 2009	Mount Lemmon	Mount Lemmon Survey	MAR	920 m	MPC · JPL
633278	2009 LX_{2}	—	June 15, 2009	Tzec Maun	Tozzi, F.	·	2.0 km	MPC · JPL
633279	2009 LE_{7}	—	June 4, 2009	Mount Lemmon	Mount Lemmon Survey	L5	10 km	MPC · JPL
633280	2009 LN_{7}	—	October 11, 2013	Calar Alto-CASADO	Mottola, S., Hellmich, S.	L5	7.4 km	MPC · JPL
633281	2009 LZ_{7}	—	September 2, 2010	Mount Lemmon	Mount Lemmon Survey	·	1.4 km	MPC · JPL
633282	2009 MG_{2}	—	August 30, 2005	Palomar	NEAT	·	2.5 km	MPC · JPL
633283	2009 MB_{5}	—	June 21, 2009	Kitt Peak	Spacewatch	·	1.5 km	MPC · JPL
633284	2009 MC_{5}	—	December 13, 2006	Kitt Peak	Spacewatch	·	1.7 km	MPC · JPL
633285	2009 MK_{5}	—	June 21, 2009	Kitt Peak	Spacewatch	·	2.0 km	MPC · JPL
633286	2009 MM_{11}	—	September 18, 2010	Mount Lemmon	Mount Lemmon Survey	·	1.7 km	MPC · JPL
633287	2009 OK_{1}	—	July 19, 2009	Sandlot	G. Hug	·	1.6 km	MPC · JPL
633288	2009 OA_{8}	—	July 24, 2009	Dauban	C. Rinner, Kugel, F.	·	2.5 km	MPC · JPL
633289	2009 OY_{11}	—	July 27, 2009	Kitt Peak	Spacewatch	·	1.7 km	MPC · JPL
633290	2009 OG_{14}	—	July 29, 2009	Catalina	CSS	JUN	1.2 km	MPC · JPL
633291	2009 OH_{20}	—	July 29, 2009	La Sagra	OAM	·	2.1 km	MPC · JPL
633292	2009 OG_{23}	—	July 16, 2009	Bergisch Gladbach	W. Bickel	·	2.5 km	MPC · JPL
633293	2009 OM_{25}	—	January 10, 2007	Kitt Peak	Spacewatch	·	2.3 km	MPC · JPL
633294	2009 OD_{26}	—	July 28, 2009	Kitt Peak	Spacewatch	·	780 m	MPC · JPL
633295	2009 OD_{30}	—	October 26, 2005	Kitt Peak	Spacewatch	·	1.3 km	MPC · JPL
633296	2009 PS	—	August 13, 2009	Dauban	C. Rinner, Kugel, F.	V	700 m	MPC · JPL
633297	2009 PF_{3}	—	August 12, 2009	La Sagra	OAM	·	2.0 km	MPC · JPL
633298	2009 PP_{8}	—	January 26, 2006	Mount Lemmon	Mount Lemmon Survey	·	2.8 km	MPC · JPL
633299	2009 PG_{13}	—	June 23, 2009	Mount Lemmon	Mount Lemmon Survey	·	1.5 km	MPC · JPL
633300	2009 PV_{13}	—	May 2, 2001	Kitt Peak	Spacewatch	·	1.2 km	MPC · JPL

== 633301–633400 ==
back to top

Designation			Discovery			Properties		Ref
Permanent	Provisional	Named after	Date	Site	Discoverer(s)	Category	Diam.	Ref
633301	2009 PJ_{14}	—	June 23, 2009	Mount Lemmon	Mount Lemmon Survey	·	1.9 km	MPC · JPL
633302	2009 PE_{20}	—	August 15, 2009	Catalina	CSS	·	1.4 km	MPC · JPL
633303	2009 PY_{21}	—	August 2, 2016	Haleakala	Pan-STARRS 1	·	700 m	MPC · JPL
633304	2009 QE	—	August 16, 2009	Catalina	CSS	(2076)	1.1 km	MPC · JPL
633305	2009 QX	—	August 1, 2009	Kitt Peak	Spacewatch	·	3.3 km	MPC · JPL
633306	2009 QH_{3}	—	December 1, 2005	Kitt Peak	Spacewatch	·	1.8 km	MPC · JPL
633307	2009 QQ_{3}	—	September 12, 2002	Palomar	NEAT	V	680 m	MPC · JPL
633308	2009 QJ_{12}	—	July 28, 2009	Kitt Peak	Spacewatch	·	2.8 km	MPC · JPL
633309	2009 QA_{21}	—	August 17, 2009	La Sagra	OAM	·	690 m	MPC · JPL
633310	2009 QN_{41}	—	May 13, 2005	Mount Lemmon	Mount Lemmon Survey	·	1.1 km	MPC · JPL
633311	2009 QQ_{43}	—	August 27, 2009	Kitt Peak	Spacewatch	·	1.8 km	MPC · JPL
633312	2009 QC_{46}	—	September 7, 2000	Kitt Peak	Spacewatch	·	2.0 km	MPC · JPL
633313	2009 QE_{49}	—	August 28, 2000	Cerro Tololo	Deep Ecliptic Survey	·	1.9 km	MPC · JPL
633314	2009 QZ_{50}	—	May 21, 2004	Kitt Peak	Spacewatch	·	1.8 km	MPC · JPL
633315	2009 QJ_{62}	—	August 29, 2009	Catalina	CSS	·	1.5 km	MPC · JPL
633316	2009 QW_{63}	—	April 3, 2008	Kitt Peak	Spacewatch	·	2.0 km	MPC · JPL
633317	2009 QK_{65}	—	July 29, 2014	Haleakala	Pan-STARRS 1	·	2.0 km	MPC · JPL
633318	2009 QT_{65}	—	November 25, 2005	Kitt Peak	Spacewatch	·	1.4 km	MPC · JPL
633319	2009 QX_{66}	—	December 12, 2014	Haleakala	Pan-STARRS 1	EUN	1.1 km	MPC · JPL
633320	2009 QC_{67}	—	November 10, 2010	Mount Lemmon	Mount Lemmon Survey	·	1.8 km	MPC · JPL
633321	2009 QG_{71}	—	August 27, 2009	Kitt Peak	Spacewatch	HOF	2.0 km	MPC · JPL
633322	2009 QA_{75}	—	August 18, 2009	Kitt Peak	Spacewatch	·	1.9 km	MPC · JPL
633323	2009 QR_{75}	—	August 18, 2009	Kitt Peak	Spacewatch	L4	7.3 km	MPC · JPL
633324	2009 QH_{76}	—	August 28, 2009	Kitt Peak	Spacewatch	·	1.5 km	MPC · JPL
633325	2009 QF_{78}	—	August 18, 2009	Kitt Peak	Spacewatch	HOF	1.9 km	MPC · JPL
633326 Allashapovalova	2009 RT_{2}	Allashapovalova	September 11, 2009	Zelenchukskaya Station	T. V. Krjačko, B. Satovski	·	1.9 km	MPC · JPL
633327	2009 RK_{3}	—	November 4, 2005	Mount Lemmon	Mount Lemmon Survey	·	1.9 km	MPC · JPL
633328	2009 RL_{5}	—	December 16, 2000	Kitt Peak	Spacewatch	DOR	2.5 km	MPC · JPL
633329	2009 RE_{22}	—	September 15, 2009	Kitt Peak	Spacewatch	·	2.3 km	MPC · JPL
633330	2009 RG_{22}	—	September 15, 2009	Kitt Peak	Spacewatch	·	1.9 km	MPC · JPL
633331	2009 RM_{27}	—	September 16, 2009	Kitt Peak	Spacewatch	·	730 m	MPC · JPL
633332	2009 RX_{27}	—	September 10, 2009	Tenerife	ESA OGS	EOS	1.8 km	MPC · JPL
633333	2009 RA_{38}	—	May 14, 2008	Mount Lemmon	Mount Lemmon Survey	·	1.5 km	MPC · JPL
633334	2009 RE_{38}	—	September 15, 2009	Kitt Peak	Spacewatch	·	1.9 km	MPC · JPL
633335	2009 RJ_{42}	—	September 15, 2009	Kitt Peak	Spacewatch	·	1.7 km	MPC · JPL
633336	2009 RK_{42}	—	September 15, 2009	Kitt Peak	Spacewatch	GEF	1.1 km	MPC · JPL
633337	2009 RB_{48}	—	September 15, 2009	Kitt Peak	Spacewatch	MRX	910 m	MPC · JPL
633338	2009 RG_{57}	—	September 15, 2009	Kitt Peak	Spacewatch	L4 · ERY	6.4 km	MPC · JPL
633339	2009 RY_{60}	—	September 14, 2009	Catalina	CSS	·	1.8 km	MPC · JPL
633340	2009 RA_{66}	—	September 15, 2009	Kitt Peak	Spacewatch	·	1.5 km	MPC · JPL
633341	2009 RN_{76}	—	November 16, 2010	Mount Lemmon	Mount Lemmon Survey	·	3.6 km	MPC · JPL
633342	2009 RV_{76}	—	January 7, 2006	Kitt Peak	Spacewatch	·	1.8 km	MPC · JPL
633343	2009 RF_{77}	—	September 15, 2009	Mount Lemmon	Mount Lemmon Survey	NEM	1.9 km	MPC · JPL
633344	2009 RT_{79}	—	September 15, 2009	Kitt Peak	Spacewatch	·	1.4 km	MPC · JPL
633345	2009 RB_{80}	—	September 15, 2009	Kitt Peak	Spacewatch	·	1.6 km	MPC · JPL
633346	2009 RZ_{80}	—	September 15, 2009	Kitt Peak	Spacewatch	L4	7.5 km	MPC · JPL
633347	2009 RY_{81}	—	September 15, 2009	Kitt Peak	Spacewatch	V	520 m	MPC · JPL
633348 Shvartsman	2009 SA_{2}	Shvartsman	September 17, 2009	Zelenchukskaya Station	T. V. Krjačko, B. Satovski	·	2.4 km	MPC · JPL
633349	2009 SV_{7}	—	March 1, 2008	Kitt Peak	Spacewatch	·	680 m	MPC · JPL
633350	2009 SY_{7}	—	June 17, 2005	Mount Lemmon	Mount Lemmon Survey	V	480 m	MPC · JPL
633351	2009 SM_{8}	—	March 16, 2004	Catalina	CSS	·	1.1 km	MPC · JPL
633352	2009 SV_{8}	—	September 16, 2009	Mount Lemmon	Mount Lemmon Survey	·	1.8 km	MPC · JPL
633353	2009 SV_{14}	—	April 5, 2008	Kitt Peak	Spacewatch	·	1.0 km	MPC · JPL
633354	2009 ST_{15}	—	September 18, 2009	Kitt Peak	Spacewatch	·	1.8 km	MPC · JPL
633355	2009 SV_{16}	—	September 12, 2009	Kitt Peak	Spacewatch	·	820 m	MPC · JPL
633356	2009 SQ_{17}	—	September 17, 2009	Moletai	K. Černis, Zdanavicius, K.	·	610 m	MPC · JPL
633357	2009 SZ_{17}	—	December 25, 2005	Mount Lemmon	Mount Lemmon Survey	·	1.5 km	MPC · JPL
633358	2009 SE_{20}	—	September 21, 2009	Črni Vrh	Mikuž, B.	·	1.9 km	MPC · JPL
633359	2009 SQ_{22}	—	October 26, 2005	Kitt Peak	Spacewatch	GEF	1.0 km	MPC · JPL
633360	2009 SS_{23}	—	May 29, 2003	Cerro Tololo	Deep Ecliptic Survey	·	1.9 km	MPC · JPL
633361	2009 SP_{30}	—	September 16, 2009	Kitt Peak	Spacewatch	·	620 m	MPC · JPL
633362	2009 SR_{35}	—	September 16, 2009	Kitt Peak	Spacewatch	WIT	820 m	MPC · JPL
633363	2009 SS_{36}	—	September 16, 2009	Kitt Peak	Spacewatch	·	2.0 km	MPC · JPL
633364	2009 SS_{38}	—	September 16, 2009	Kitt Peak	Spacewatch	PAD	1.2 km	MPC · JPL
633365	2009 SO_{40}	—	September 16, 2009	Kitt Peak	Spacewatch	NYS	810 m	MPC · JPL
633366	2009 ST_{41}	—	September 16, 2009	Mount Lemmon	Mount Lemmon Survey	·	1.6 km	MPC · JPL
633367	2009 SC_{54}	—	September 17, 2009	Mount Lemmon	Mount Lemmon Survey	·	1.6 km	MPC · JPL
633368	2009 SJ_{54}	—	October 30, 2005	Mount Lemmon	Mount Lemmon Survey	·	1.6 km	MPC · JPL
633369	2009 SO_{64}	—	September 17, 2009	Mount Lemmon	Mount Lemmon Survey	AGN	930 m	MPC · JPL
633370	2009 SV_{78}	—	September 18, 2009	Kitt Peak	Spacewatch	·	950 m	MPC · JPL
633371	2009 SP_{81}	—	March 10, 2008	Kitt Peak	Spacewatch	V	440 m	MPC · JPL
633372	2009 SZ_{86}	—	February 23, 2007	Mount Lemmon	Mount Lemmon Survey	·	1.8 km	MPC · JPL
633373	2009 SO_{87}	—	September 18, 2009	Mount Lemmon	Mount Lemmon Survey	·	550 m	MPC · JPL
633374	2009 SA_{90}	—	September 18, 2009	Mount Lemmon	Mount Lemmon Survey	·	1.9 km	MPC · JPL
633375	2009 SP_{93}	—	October 19, 2006	Mount Lemmon	Mount Lemmon Survey	·	1.1 km	MPC · JPL
633376	2009 SU_{94}	—	October 29, 2005	Kitt Peak	Spacewatch	·	2.3 km	MPC · JPL
633377	2009 SS_{101}	—	October 30, 2005	Mount Lemmon	Mount Lemmon Survey	·	1.5 km	MPC · JPL
633378	2009 SV_{106}	—	September 16, 2009	Mount Lemmon	Mount Lemmon Survey	(2076)	720 m	MPC · JPL
633379	2009 SS_{108}	—	August 27, 2009	Catalina	CSS	·	2.2 km	MPC · JPL
633380	2009 SC_{109}	—	August 18, 2009	Kitt Peak	Spacewatch	·	2.4 km	MPC · JPL
633381	2009 SF_{109}	—	March 8, 2008	Kitt Peak	Spacewatch	·	1.6 km	MPC · JPL
633382	2009 SE_{116}	—	February 17, 2007	Kitt Peak	Spacewatch	·	1.5 km	MPC · JPL
633383	2009 SG_{116}	—	August 28, 2009	Kitt Peak	Spacewatch	·	1.4 km	MPC · JPL
633384	2009 SE_{122}	—	February 21, 2002	Kitt Peak	Spacewatch	·	2.0 km	MPC · JPL
633385	2009 SY_{122}	—	January 27, 2007	Kitt Peak	Spacewatch	·	1.4 km	MPC · JPL
633386	2009 SJ_{124}	—	February 12, 2004	Kitt Peak	Spacewatch	·	1.2 km	MPC · JPL
633387	2009 SG_{126}	—	September 18, 2009	Kitt Peak	Spacewatch	·	1.6 km	MPC · JPL
633388	2009 SA_{128}	—	September 18, 2009	Kitt Peak	Spacewatch	·	1.6 km	MPC · JPL
633389	2009 SC_{128}	—	September 18, 2009	Kitt Peak	Spacewatch	AGN	890 m	MPC · JPL
633390	2009 SS_{131}	—	September 18, 2009	Kitt Peak	Spacewatch	·	1.4 km	MPC · JPL
633391	2009 SU_{131}	—	September 18, 2009	Kitt Peak	Spacewatch	KOR	1.1 km	MPC · JPL
633392	2009 SN_{134}	—	September 18, 2009	Kitt Peak	Spacewatch	AGN	920 m	MPC · JPL
633393	2009 SN_{137}	—	September 18, 2009	Kitt Peak	Spacewatch	NEM	2.1 km	MPC · JPL
633394	2009 SK_{142}	—	April 6, 2008	Kitt Peak	Spacewatch	·	1.6 km	MPC · JPL
633395	2009 SG_{143}	—	March 10, 2007	Mount Lemmon	Mount Lemmon Survey	·	1.7 km	MPC · JPL
633396	2009 SC_{146}	—	August 28, 2009	Kitt Peak	Spacewatch	·	1.6 km	MPC · JPL
633397	2009 SE_{146}	—	August 22, 2004	Kitt Peak	Spacewatch	·	2.3 km	MPC · JPL
633398	2009 SV_{149}	—	September 20, 2009	Kitt Peak	Spacewatch	PAD	1.5 km	MPC · JPL
633399	2009 SU_{151}	—	September 20, 2009	Kitt Peak	Spacewatch	L4	9.3 km	MPC · JPL
633400	2009 SO_{155}	—	October 27, 2005	Kitt Peak	Spacewatch	·	1.4 km	MPC · JPL

== 633401–633500 ==
back to top

Designation			Discovery			Properties		Ref
Permanent	Provisional	Named after	Date	Site	Discoverer(s)	Category	Diam.	Ref
633401	2009 ST_{155}	—	September 12, 2009	Kitt Peak	Spacewatch	L4	6.8 km	MPC · JPL
633402	2009 SS_{158}	—	September 10, 2004	Kitt Peak	Spacewatch	·	1.6 km	MPC · JPL
633403	2009 SW_{160}	—	September 20, 2009	Kitt Peak	Spacewatch	·	1.7 km	MPC · JPL
633404	2009 SN_{164}	—	March 25, 1998	Kitt Peak	Spacewatch	·	2.3 km	MPC · JPL
633405	2009 SS_{167}	—	September 23, 2009	Mount Lemmon	Mount Lemmon Survey	·	880 m	MPC · JPL
633406	2009 SC_{171}	—	September 20, 2009	Kitt Peak	Spacewatch	·	1.4 km	MPC · JPL
633407	2009 SD_{175}	—	September 19, 2009	Mount Lemmon	Mount Lemmon Survey	·	1.7 km	MPC · JPL
633408	2009 SL_{177}	—	March 26, 2007	Mount Lemmon	Mount Lemmon Survey	GEF	1.2 km	MPC · JPL
633409	2009 SH_{179}	—	March 31, 2008	Mount Lemmon	Mount Lemmon Survey	·	750 m	MPC · JPL
633410	2009 ST_{179}	—	September 20, 2009	Mount Lemmon	Mount Lemmon Survey	AGN	900 m	MPC · JPL
633411	2009 SN_{185}	—	August 25, 2004	Kitt Peak	Spacewatch	·	2.0 km	MPC · JPL
633412	2009 SG_{191}	—	September 22, 2009	Kitt Peak	Spacewatch	NEM	2.0 km	MPC · JPL
633413	2009 SM_{191}	—	September 22, 2009	Kitt Peak	Spacewatch	·	1.9 km	MPC · JPL
633414	2009 SP_{193}	—	September 12, 2009	Kitt Peak	Spacewatch	AGN	940 m	MPC · JPL
633415	2009 ST_{194}	—	February 21, 2007	Mount Lemmon	Mount Lemmon Survey	·	1.7 km	MPC · JPL
633416	2009 SX_{194}	—	October 24, 1995	Kitt Peak	Spacewatch	·	880 m	MPC · JPL
633417	2009 SS_{195}	—	September 22, 2009	Mount Lemmon	Mount Lemmon Survey	·	1.2 km	MPC · JPL
633418	2009 SU_{196}	—	December 4, 2005	Mount Lemmon	Mount Lemmon Survey	·	1.8 km	MPC · JPL
633419	2009 SV_{196}	—	September 22, 2009	Kitt Peak	Spacewatch	·	1.5 km	MPC · JPL
633420	2009 SW_{197}	—	November 30, 2005	Kitt Peak	Spacewatch	·	1.7 km	MPC · JPL
633421	2009 SL_{198}	—	October 15, 2002	Palomar	NEAT	·	1.1 km	MPC · JPL
633422	2009 ST_{198}	—	September 22, 2009	Kitt Peak	Spacewatch	·	930 m	MPC · JPL
633423	2009 SX_{198}	—	September 22, 2009	Kitt Peak	Spacewatch	HOF	2.3 km	MPC · JPL
633424	2009 SJ_{200}	—	September 22, 2009	Kitt Peak	Spacewatch	·	1.6 km	MPC · JPL
633425	2009 SO_{200}	—	November 3, 2000	Kitt Peak	Spacewatch	·	1.8 km	MPC · JPL
633426	2009 SS_{201}	—	September 22, 2009	Kitt Peak	Spacewatch	L4	7.9 km	MPC · JPL
633427	2009 SW_{206}	—	September 20, 2009	Kitt Peak	Spacewatch	·	1.9 km	MPC · JPL
633428	2009 SP_{208}	—	September 23, 2009	Kitt Peak	Spacewatch	·	670 m	MPC · JPL
633429	2009 SH_{219}	—	March 10, 2007	Mount Lemmon	Mount Lemmon Survey	·	1.8 km	MPC · JPL
633430	2009 SN_{224}	—	September 25, 2009	Kitt Peak	Spacewatch	AGN	1.0 km	MPC · JPL
633431	2009 SS_{225}	—	August 16, 2009	Kitt Peak	Spacewatch	DOR	1.9 km	MPC · JPL
633432	2009 SG_{234}	—	December 13, 2006	Mount Lemmon	Mount Lemmon Survey	·	1.1 km	MPC · JPL
633433	2009 SC_{240}	—	September 17, 2009	Catalina	CSS	·	1.8 km	MPC · JPL
633434	2009 SJ_{240}	—	July 11, 2004	Palomar	NEAT	·	2.6 km	MPC · JPL
633435	2009 SL_{242}	—	September 22, 2009	Catalina	CSS	V	620 m	MPC · JPL
633436	2009 SN_{244}	—	December 30, 2005	Mount Lemmon	Mount Lemmon Survey	·	1.8 km	MPC · JPL
633437	2009 SW_{246}	—	September 7, 2008	Mount Lemmon	Mount Lemmon Survey	L4	7.6 km	MPC · JPL
633438	2009 ST_{249}	—	August 27, 2005	Palomar	NEAT	·	1.2 km	MPC · JPL
633439	2009 SX_{249}	—	December 13, 2006	Kitt Peak	Spacewatch	·	1.2 km	MPC · JPL
633440	2009 SD_{250}	—	July 4, 2005	Mount Lemmon	Mount Lemmon Survey	·	790 m	MPC · JPL
633441	2009 SB_{252}	—	September 21, 2009	Kitt Peak	Spacewatch	L4	6.6 km	MPC · JPL
633442	2009 SL_{253}	—	August 25, 2000	Cerro Tololo	Deep Ecliptic Survey	·	1.6 km	MPC · JPL
633443	2009 SH_{255}	—	April 29, 2008	Kitt Peak	Spacewatch	·	2.2 km	MPC · JPL
633444	2009 SH_{256}	—	September 21, 2009	Catalina	CSS	GEF	1.4 km	MPC · JPL
633445	2009 SW_{261}	—	September 23, 2009	Kitt Peak	Spacewatch	·	2.3 km	MPC · JPL
633446	2009 SM_{262}	—	September 23, 2009	Kitt Peak	Spacewatch	·	1.5 km	MPC · JPL
633447	2009 SX_{263}	—	September 23, 2009	Mount Lemmon	Mount Lemmon Survey	L4	6.8 km	MPC · JPL
633448	2009 SC_{270}	—	September 7, 2004	Kitt Peak	Spacewatch	AST	1.6 km	MPC · JPL
633449	2009 SH_{272}	—	September 20, 2009	Kitt Peak	Spacewatch	L4	6.5 km	MPC · JPL
633450	2009 SA_{274}	—	December 28, 2005	Kitt Peak	Spacewatch	·	2.5 km	MPC · JPL
633451	2009 SE_{274}	—	September 25, 2009	Kitt Peak	Spacewatch	GEF	1.1 km	MPC · JPL
633452	2009 SQ_{278}	—	September 25, 2009	Kitt Peak	Spacewatch	·	1.6 km	MPC · JPL
633453	2009 SS_{280}	—	September 25, 2009	Kitt Peak	Spacewatch	·	1.6 km	MPC · JPL
633454	2009 SH_{285}	—	August 27, 2009	Kitt Peak	Spacewatch	·	1.8 km	MPC · JPL
633455	2009 SL_{291}	—	September 25, 2009	Kitt Peak	Spacewatch	·	760 m	MPC · JPL
633456	2009 SS_{295}	—	September 27, 2009	Mount Lemmon	Mount Lemmon Survey	·	2.0 km	MPC · JPL
633457	2009 SV_{296}	—	June 23, 2005	Palomar	NEAT	PHO	2.3 km	MPC · JPL
633458	2009 SR_{298}	—	October 13, 1993	Kitt Peak	Spacewatch	EOS	2.5 km	MPC · JPL
633459	2009 SD_{300}	—	September 19, 2009	Mount Lemmon	Mount Lemmon Survey	HOF	2.3 km	MPC · JPL
633460	2009 SP_{306}	—	September 17, 2009	Mount Lemmon	Mount Lemmon Survey	·	1.4 km	MPC · JPL
633461	2009 SQ_{306}	—	October 27, 2005	Mount Lemmon	Mount Lemmon Survey	NEM	2.1 km	MPC · JPL
633462	2009 SQ_{308}	—	September 18, 2009	Kitt Peak	Spacewatch	·	2.0 km	MPC · JPL
633463	2009 SX_{308}	—	September 18, 2009	Mount Lemmon	Mount Lemmon Survey	·	1.4 km	MPC · JPL
633464	2009 SA_{309}	—	February 21, 2007	Mount Lemmon	Mount Lemmon Survey	·	1.9 km	MPC · JPL
633465	2009 SD_{311}	—	January 14, 2002	Kitt Peak	Spacewatch	·	1.9 km	MPC · JPL
633466	2009 SZ_{312}	—	September 18, 2009	Kitt Peak	Spacewatch	KOR	1.1 km	MPC · JPL
633467	2009 ST_{319}	—	April 15, 2008	Mount Lemmon	Mount Lemmon Survey	·	660 m	MPC · JPL
633468	2009 SP_{320}	—	September 21, 2009	Mount Lemmon	Mount Lemmon Survey	L4	6.8 km	MPC · JPL
633469	2009 SE_{321}	—	September 21, 2009	Kitt Peak	Spacewatch	L4	7.0 km	MPC · JPL
633470	2009 SZ_{322}	—	September 18, 2009	Kitt Peak	Spacewatch	L4	7.7 km	MPC · JPL
633471	2009 SD_{324}	—	September 24, 2009	Mount Lemmon	Mount Lemmon Survey	·	1.4 km	MPC · JPL
633472	2009 SB_{326}	—	April 24, 2003	Kitt Peak	Spacewatch	L4 · ERY	9.5 km	MPC · JPL
633473	2009 SJ_{326}	—	September 29, 2009	Črni Vrh	Skvarč, J.	·	1.3 km	MPC · JPL
633474	2009 SV_{341}	—	September 18, 2009	Kitt Peak	Spacewatch	·	1.6 km	MPC · JPL
633475	2009 SX_{354}	—	September 29, 2009	Kitt Peak	Spacewatch	L4	7.0 km	MPC · JPL
633476	2009 SU_{355}	—	February 13, 2002	Kitt Peak	Spacewatch	L4	6.7 km	MPC · JPL
633477	2009 SD_{356}	—	September 27, 2009	Kitt Peak	Spacewatch	L4	6.5 km	MPC · JPL
633478	2009 SA_{358}	—	September 19, 2009	Mount Lemmon	Mount Lemmon Survey	·	2.0 km	MPC · JPL
633479	2009 SZ_{369}	—	August 28, 2009	Kitt Peak	Spacewatch	AGN	1.0 km	MPC · JPL
633480	2009 SO_{370}	—	September 20, 2009	Kitt Peak	Spacewatch	KOR	1.1 km	MPC · JPL
633481	2009 SF_{371}	—	January 17, 2007	Kitt Peak	Spacewatch	·	860 m	MPC · JPL
633482	2009 ST_{371}	—	September 21, 2009	Kitt Peak	Spacewatch	KOR	1.2 km	MPC · JPL
633483	2009 SU_{372}	—	September 23, 2009	Mount Lemmon	Mount Lemmon Survey	·	920 m	MPC · JPL
633484	2009 SH_{375}	—	February 3, 2012	Haleakala	Pan-STARRS 1	·	1.7 km	MPC · JPL
633485	2009 SQ_{382}	—	September 21, 2009	Kitt Peak	Spacewatch	·	1.9 km	MPC · JPL
633486	2009 ST_{382}	—	November 28, 2013	Kitt Peak	Spacewatch	V	500 m	MPC · JPL
633487	2009 SK_{383}	—	September 28, 2009	Kitt Peak	Spacewatch	·	610 m	MPC · JPL
633488	2009 SY_{383}	—	September 18, 2009	Kitt Peak	Spacewatch	AGN	910 m	MPC · JPL
633489	2009 SD_{385}	—	January 30, 2011	Mount Lemmon	Mount Lemmon Survey	·	1.6 km	MPC · JPL
633490	2009 SQ_{389}	—	November 28, 2013	Mount Lemmon	Mount Lemmon Survey	·	820 m	MPC · JPL
633491	2009 SC_{394}	—	November 26, 2014	Haleakala	Pan-STARRS 1	·	1.5 km	MPC · JPL
633492	2009 SD_{394}	—	September 27, 2009	Mount Lemmon	Mount Lemmon Survey	·	1.5 km	MPC · JPL
633493	2009 SS_{394}	—	March 28, 2012	Mount Lemmon	Mount Lemmon Survey	·	1.5 km	MPC · JPL
633494	2009 SV_{394}	—	January 29, 2011	Mount Lemmon	Mount Lemmon Survey	·	1.4 km	MPC · JPL
633495	2009 SY_{396}	—	September 26, 2009	Kitt Peak	Spacewatch	·	1.7 km	MPC · JPL
633496	2009 SD_{398}	—	November 30, 2005	Mount Lemmon	Mount Lemmon Survey	·	1.5 km	MPC · JPL
633497	2009 SE_{398}	—	September 27, 2009	Kitt Peak	Spacewatch	KOR	1.0 km	MPC · JPL
633498	2009 SF_{398}	—	September 26, 2009	Kitt Peak	Spacewatch	·	1.6 km	MPC · JPL
633499	2009 SJ_{398}	—	September 26, 2009	Kitt Peak	Spacewatch	·	1.4 km	MPC · JPL
633500	2009 SZ_{399}	—	September 17, 2009	Mount Lemmon	Mount Lemmon Survey	·	1.4 km	MPC · JPL

== 633501–633600 ==
back to top

Designation			Discovery			Properties		Ref
Permanent	Provisional	Named after	Date	Site	Discoverer(s)	Category	Diam.	Ref
633501	2009 SE_{401}	—	September 25, 2009	Mount Lemmon	Mount Lemmon Survey	AGN	910 m	MPC · JPL
633502	2009 SY_{408}	—	September 25, 2009	Kitt Peak	Spacewatch	·	1.6 km	MPC · JPL
633503	2009 SS_{409}	—	September 18, 2009	Kitt Peak	Spacewatch	L4	6.1 km	MPC · JPL
633504	2009 SM_{413}	—	September 18, 2009	Kitt Peak	Spacewatch	KOR	1.1 km	MPC · JPL
633505	2009 ST_{413}	—	September 27, 2009	Mount Lemmon	Mount Lemmon Survey	HOF	2.1 km	MPC · JPL
633506	2009 SU_{413}	—	September 27, 2009	Kitt Peak	Spacewatch	·	1.4 km	MPC · JPL
633507	2009 SK_{414}	—	September 29, 2009	Mount Lemmon	Mount Lemmon Survey	AGN	820 m	MPC · JPL
633508	2009 ST_{414}	—	September 20, 2009	Kitt Peak	Spacewatch	L4	6.8 km	MPC · JPL
633509	2009 SW_{423}	—	September 18, 2009	Mount Lemmon	Mount Lemmon Survey	MRX	810 m	MPC · JPL
633510	2009 SF_{428}	—	September 20, 2009	Mount Lemmon	Mount Lemmon Survey	KOR	900 m	MPC · JPL
633511	2009 TC	—	March 3, 2006	Mount Lemmon	Mount Lemmon Survey	·	2.9 km	MPC · JPL
633512	2009 TT_{6}	—	December 1, 2005	Palomar	NEAT	·	2.1 km	MPC · JPL
633513	2009 TG_{22}	—	August 28, 2003	Palomar	NEAT	·	3.8 km	MPC · JPL
633514	2009 TK_{24}	—	October 14, 2009	Mount Lemmon	Mount Lemmon Survey	KOR	1.1 km	MPC · JPL
633515	2009 TS_{27}	—	October 15, 2009	La Sagra	OAM	·	1.9 km	MPC · JPL
633516	2009 TX_{29}	—	January 18, 2004	Kitt Peak	Spacewatch	·	710 m	MPC · JPL
633517	2009 TM_{36}	—	October 14, 2009	La Sagra	OAM	·	680 m	MPC · JPL
633518	2009 TU_{38}	—	October 2, 2009	Mount Lemmon	Mount Lemmon Survey	TIR	3.5 km	MPC · JPL
633519	2009 TB_{40}	—	October 15, 2009	Catalina	CSS	GEF	1.5 km	MPC · JPL
633520	2009 TC_{40}	—	March 30, 2008	Kitt Peak	Spacewatch	·	1.0 km	MPC · JPL
633521	2009 TD_{43}	—	October 1, 2009	Kitt Peak	Spacewatch	·	1.9 km	MPC · JPL
633522	2009 TE_{43}	—	October 2, 2009	Mount Lemmon	Mount Lemmon Survey	·	1.8 km	MPC · JPL
633523	2009 TU_{51}	—	October 1, 2014	Kitt Peak	Spacewatch	·	1.5 km	MPC · JPL
633524	2009 TF_{54}	—	October 14, 2009	Mount Lemmon	Mount Lemmon Survey	·	1.4 km	MPC · JPL
633525	2009 UV_{2}	—	October 18, 2009	Tzec Maun	Shurpakov, S.	·	970 m	MPC · JPL
633526	2009 UF_{3}	—	January 5, 2000	Kitt Peak	Spacewatch	·	1.2 km	MPC · JPL
633527	2009 UP_{3}	—	October 19, 2009	Mayhill	Lowe, A.	L4	10 km	MPC · JPL
633528	2009 UB_{15}	—	September 28, 2009	Mount Lemmon	Mount Lemmon Survey	·	1.6 km	MPC · JPL
633529	2009 UR_{23}	—	September 22, 2009	Kitt Peak	Spacewatch	·	1.2 km	MPC · JPL
633530	2009 UC_{25}	—	September 1, 2005	Palomar	NEAT	·	1.1 km	MPC · JPL
633531	2009 UO_{29}	—	October 18, 2009	Mount Lemmon	Mount Lemmon Survey	HOF	1.9 km	MPC · JPL
633532	2009 UO_{36}	—	October 22, 2009	Mount Lemmon	Mount Lemmon Survey	·	1.5 km	MPC · JPL
633533	2009 UF_{41}	—	October 18, 2009	Mount Lemmon	Mount Lemmon Survey	·	1.3 km	MPC · JPL
633534	2009 UL_{42}	—	October 18, 2009	Mount Lemmon	Mount Lemmon Survey	·	870 m	MPC · JPL
633535	2009 UC_{43}	—	October 18, 2009	Mount Lemmon	Mount Lemmon Survey	·	1.3 km	MPC · JPL
633536	2009 UM_{43}	—	September 14, 2009	Kitt Peak	Spacewatch	·	2.1 km	MPC · JPL
633537	2009 UD_{50}	—	October 22, 2009	Mount Lemmon	Mount Lemmon Survey	·	1.6 km	MPC · JPL
633538	2009 UY_{51}	—	April 18, 2007	Kitt Peak	Spacewatch	KOR	1.3 km	MPC · JPL
633539	2009 UE_{55}	—	October 23, 2009	Mount Lemmon	Mount Lemmon Survey	·	1.9 km	MPC · JPL
633540	2009 UT_{57}	—	October 23, 2009	Mount Lemmon	Mount Lemmon Survey	KOR	1.2 km	MPC · JPL
633541	2009 UX_{58}	—	October 23, 2009	Mount Lemmon	Mount Lemmon Survey	·	2.1 km	MPC · JPL
633542	2009 US_{64}	—	October 17, 2009	Mount Lemmon	Mount Lemmon Survey	HOF	1.8 km	MPC · JPL
633543	2009 UQ_{66}	—	February 8, 2002	Kitt Peak	Deep Ecliptic Survey	AGN	850 m	MPC · JPL
633544	2009 UR_{67}	—	July 16, 2004	Cerro Tololo	Deep Ecliptic Survey	HOF	2.2 km	MPC · JPL
633545	2009 UE_{68}	—	September 29, 2009	Kitt Peak	Spacewatch	·	1.6 km	MPC · JPL
633546	2009 UK_{73}	—	September 22, 2009	Mount Lemmon	Mount Lemmon Survey	·	1.7 km	MPC · JPL
633547	2009 UC_{74}	—	December 1, 2006	Mount Lemmon	Mount Lemmon Survey	NYS	760 m	MPC · JPL
633548	2009 UN_{74}	—	March 18, 2007	Kitt Peak	Spacewatch	·	1.8 km	MPC · JPL
633549	2009 UM_{75}	—	October 21, 2009	Mount Lemmon	Mount Lemmon Survey	·	1.9 km	MPC · JPL
633550	2009 UF_{80}	—	October 22, 2009	Mount Lemmon	Mount Lemmon Survey	HOF	2.1 km	MPC · JPL
633551	2009 UA_{81}	—	October 26, 2005	Kitt Peak	Spacewatch	·	1.5 km	MPC · JPL
633552	2009 US_{89}	—	March 15, 2007	Catalina	CSS	·	1.7 km	MPC · JPL
633553	2009 UG_{101}	—	October 23, 2009	Mount Lemmon	Mount Lemmon Survey	KOR	1.3 km	MPC · JPL
633554	2009 US_{104}	—	October 25, 2009	Mount Lemmon	Mount Lemmon Survey	·	1.5 km	MPC · JPL
633555	2009 UU_{104}	—	October 25, 2009	Mount Lemmon	Mount Lemmon Survey	(16286)	1.8 km	MPC · JPL
633556	2009 UK_{106}	—	October 21, 2009	Mount Lemmon	Mount Lemmon Survey	·	1.0 km	MPC · JPL
633557	2009 UR_{107}	—	May 29, 2008	Mount Lemmon	Mount Lemmon Survey	V	610 m	MPC · JPL
633558	2009 UC_{111}	—	June 29, 2005	Kitt Peak	Spacewatch	·	660 m	MPC · JPL
633559	2009 UE_{111}	—	July 29, 2005	Palomar	NEAT	·	1.0 km	MPC · JPL
633560	2009 UF_{115}	—	September 12, 2009	Kitt Peak	Spacewatch	·	4.2 km	MPC · JPL
633561	2009 UO_{115}	—	September 20, 2009	Kitt Peak	Spacewatch	NYS	880 m	MPC · JPL
633562	2009 UE_{117}	—	October 22, 2009	Mount Lemmon	Mount Lemmon Survey	·	790 m	MPC · JPL
633563	2009 UU_{117}	—	October 22, 2009	Mount Lemmon	Mount Lemmon Survey	·	1.8 km	MPC · JPL
633564	2009 UE_{118}	—	September 15, 2009	Kitt Peak	Spacewatch	·	610 m	MPC · JPL
633565	2009 US_{119}	—	September 19, 2009	Kitt Peak	Spacewatch	·	1.8 km	MPC · JPL
633566	2009 UU_{120}	—	September 12, 2009	Kitt Peak	Spacewatch	L4	6.4 km	MPC · JPL
633567	2009 UW_{122}	—	March 14, 2007	Mount Lemmon	Mount Lemmon Survey	(16286)	1.5 km	MPC · JPL
633568	2009 UD_{123}	—	October 26, 2009	Mount Lemmon	Mount Lemmon Survey	·	1.8 km	MPC · JPL
633569	2009 UL_{124}	—	December 3, 2005	Mauna Kea	A. Boattini	·	2.0 km	MPC · JPL
633570 Viktorzagainov	2009 UX_{126}	Viktorzagainov	October 21, 2009	Zelenchukskaya Stn	T. V. Krjačko, Satovski, B.	·	1.8 km	MPC · JPL
633571	2009 UM_{133}	—	October 22, 2009	Mount Lemmon	Mount Lemmon Survey	·	1.5 km	MPC · JPL
633572	2009 UC_{134}	—	September 15, 2009	Kitt Peak	Spacewatch	AGN	1.2 km	MPC · JPL
633573	2009 UT_{145}	—	November 16, 2006	Mount Lemmon	Mount Lemmon Survey	PHO	1.4 km	MPC · JPL
633574	2009 UW_{156}	—	February 6, 2016	Haleakala	Pan-STARRS 1	KOR	950 m	MPC · JPL
633575	2009 UD_{157}	—	January 23, 2006	Kitt Peak	Spacewatch	·	1.9 km	MPC · JPL
633576	2009 UK_{160}	—	October 23, 2009	Kitt Peak	Spacewatch	KOR	1.1 km	MPC · JPL
633577	2009 UG_{162}	—	October 22, 2009	Mount Lemmon	Mount Lemmon Survey	3:2	5.8 km	MPC · JPL
633578	2009 UK_{166}	—	March 2, 2011	Mount Lemmon	Mount Lemmon Survey	GEF	1.0 km	MPC · JPL
633579	2009 UT_{166}	—	October 18, 2009	Mount Lemmon	Mount Lemmon Survey	·	1.7 km	MPC · JPL
633580	2009 UG_{171}	—	October 20, 2012	Mount Lemmon	Mount Lemmon Survey	L4	8.3 km	MPC · JPL
633581	2009 UX_{173}	—	October 22, 2009	Mount Lemmon	Mount Lemmon Survey	L4	7.7 km	MPC · JPL
633582	2009 UZ_{174}	—	October 22, 2009	Mount Lemmon	Mount Lemmon Survey	·	1.7 km	MPC · JPL
633583	2009 UE_{176}	—	October 25, 2009	Kitt Peak	Spacewatch	·	690 m	MPC · JPL
633584	2009 UT_{176}	—	October 17, 2009	Mount Lemmon	Mount Lemmon Survey	·	650 m	MPC · JPL
633585	2009 UF_{179}	—	October 22, 2009	Mount Lemmon	Mount Lemmon Survey	L4	6.9 km	MPC · JPL
633586	2009 UW_{179}	—	October 18, 2009	Mount Lemmon	Mount Lemmon Survey	·	1.4 km	MPC · JPL
633587	2009 UC_{185}	—	October 16, 2009	Mount Lemmon	Mount Lemmon Survey	·	1.5 km	MPC · JPL
633588	2009 UJ_{185}	—	March 15, 2007	Kitt Peak	Spacewatch	·	1.8 km	MPC · JPL
633589	2009 UJ_{187}	—	October 18, 2009	Mount Lemmon	Mount Lemmon Survey	·	1.6 km	MPC · JPL
633590	2009 UK_{190}	—	October 18, 2009	Mount Lemmon	Mount Lemmon Survey	L4	6.4 km	MPC · JPL
633591	2009 UH_{192}	—	October 16, 2009	Mount Lemmon	Mount Lemmon Survey	AST	1.4 km	MPC · JPL
633592	2009 UW_{193}	—	September 21, 2009	Mount Lemmon	Mount Lemmon Survey	KOR	1.2 km	MPC · JPL
633593	2009 VO_{2}	—	December 4, 2000	Socorro	LINEAR	·	2.2 km	MPC · JPL
633594	2009 VB_{6}	—	November 8, 2009	Mount Lemmon	Mount Lemmon Survey	AGN	930 m	MPC · JPL
633595	2009 VE_{15}	—	November 8, 2009	Mount Lemmon	Mount Lemmon Survey	·	2.1 km	MPC · JPL
633596	2009 VR_{22}	—	April 21, 2007	Cerro Tololo	Deep Ecliptic Survey	AGN	1.1 km	MPC · JPL
633597	2009 VU_{24}	—	October 25, 2009	Kitt Peak	Spacewatch	·	2.0 km	MPC · JPL
633598	2009 VU_{31}	—	November 7, 2005	Mauna Kea	A. Boattini	·	1.8 km	MPC · JPL
633599	2009 VM_{34}	—	November 10, 2009	Mount Lemmon	Mount Lemmon Survey	·	2.0 km	MPC · JPL
633600	2009 VW_{35}	—	November 10, 2009	Mount Lemmon	Mount Lemmon Survey	·	1.9 km	MPC · JPL

== 633601–633700 ==
back to top

Designation			Discovery			Properties		Ref
Permanent	Provisional	Named after	Date	Site	Discoverer(s)	Category	Diam.	Ref
633601	2009 VA_{43}	—	July 23, 2003	Palomar	NEAT	·	3.0 km	MPC · JPL
633602	2009 VJ_{55}	—	September 25, 2005	Kitt Peak	Spacewatch	·	1.3 km	MPC · JPL
633603	2009 VF_{56}	—	November 11, 2009	Mount Lemmon	Mount Lemmon Survey	·	1.4 km	MPC · JPL
633604	2009 VC_{61}	—	August 27, 2005	Palomar	NEAT	·	1.1 km	MPC · JPL
633605	2009 VB_{65}	—	November 9, 2009	Kitt Peak	Spacewatch	·	2.1 km	MPC · JPL
633606	2009 VY_{67}	—	November 9, 2009	Mount Lemmon	Mount Lemmon Survey	V	620 m	MPC · JPL
633607	2009 VN_{69}	—	November 9, 2009	Mount Lemmon	Mount Lemmon Survey	·	1.6 km	MPC · JPL
633608	2009 VJ_{84}	—	November 9, 2009	Kitt Peak	Spacewatch	·	1.8 km	MPC · JPL
633609	2009 VU_{84}	—	September 6, 2008	Catalina	CSS	KOR	1.6 km	MPC · JPL
633610	2009 VH_{85}	—	November 10, 2009	Kitt Peak	Spacewatch	·	1.6 km	MPC · JPL
633611	2009 VK_{92}	—	May 26, 2008	Kitt Peak	Spacewatch	V	620 m	MPC · JPL
633612	2009 VY_{98}	—	November 9, 2009	Mount Lemmon	Mount Lemmon Survey	·	570 m	MPC · JPL
633613	2009 VP_{101}	—	November 11, 2009	Kitt Peak	Spacewatch	·	2.2 km	MPC · JPL
633614	2009 VX_{107}	—	April 18, 2007	Kitt Peak	Spacewatch	·	2.2 km	MPC · JPL
633615	2009 VZ_{108}	—	November 9, 2009	Kitt Peak	Spacewatch	·	810 m	MPC · JPL
633616	2009 VN_{112}	—	April 27, 2017	Haleakala	Pan-STARRS 1	·	2.3 km	MPC · JPL
633617	2009 VY_{119}	—	November 11, 2009	Mount Lemmon	Mount Lemmon Survey	·	910 m	MPC · JPL
633618	2009 VG_{120}	—	November 9, 2009	Kitt Peak	Spacewatch	·	820 m	MPC · JPL
633619	2009 VN_{120}	—	November 10, 2009	Mount Lemmon	Mount Lemmon Survey	·	1.9 km	MPC · JPL
633620	2009 VF_{122}	—	January 24, 2014	Haleakala	Pan-STARRS 1	·	760 m	MPC · JPL
633621	2009 VN_{122}	—	November 8, 2009	Mount Lemmon	Mount Lemmon Survey	·	2.0 km	MPC · JPL
633622	2009 VQ_{125}	—	November 8, 2009	Kitt Peak	Spacewatch	·	1.7 km	MPC · JPL
633623	2009 VZ_{125}	—	November 10, 2009	Mount Lemmon	Mount Lemmon Survey	·	1.6 km	MPC · JPL
633624	2009 VA_{126}	—	November 9, 2009	Mount Lemmon	Mount Lemmon Survey	AGN	990 m	MPC · JPL
633625	2009 VD_{128}	—	November 8, 2009	Mount Lemmon	Mount Lemmon Survey	L4	6.6 km	MPC · JPL
633626	2009 VS_{129}	—	November 8, 2009	Mount Lemmon	Mount Lemmon Survey	HOF	2.1 km	MPC · JPL
633627	2009 VV_{133}	—	November 8, 2009	Mount Lemmon	Mount Lemmon Survey	KOR	970 m	MPC · JPL
633628	2009 WZ_{1}	—	September 15, 2009	Kitt Peak	Spacewatch	·	1.5 km	MPC · JPL
633629	2009 WJ_{3}	—	November 16, 2009	Mount Lemmon	Mount Lemmon Survey	·	1.7 km	MPC · JPL
633630	2009 WV_{3}	—	November 16, 2009	Mount Lemmon	Mount Lemmon Survey	·	1.0 km	MPC · JPL
633631	2009 WD_{4}	—	November 16, 2009	Kitt Peak	Spacewatch	·	2.6 km	MPC · JPL
633632	2009 WW_{9}	—	March 26, 2003	Palomar	NEAT	·	1.5 km	MPC · JPL
633633	2009 WX_{9}	—	October 16, 2003	Palomar	NEAT	·	4.2 km	MPC · JPL
633634	2009 WA_{12}	—	September 17, 1995	Kitt Peak	Spacewatch	·	1.4 km	MPC · JPL
633635	2009 WL_{13}	—	November 16, 2009	Mount Lemmon	Mount Lemmon Survey	HOF	2.1 km	MPC · JPL
633636	2009 WP_{13}	—	November 16, 2009	Mount Lemmon	Mount Lemmon Survey	·	1.8 km	MPC · JPL
633637	2009 WR_{15}	—	November 16, 2009	Mount Lemmon	Mount Lemmon Survey	·	1.1 km	MPC · JPL
633638	2009 WT_{18}	—	November 17, 2009	Mount Lemmon	Mount Lemmon Survey	·	2.0 km	MPC · JPL
633639	2009 WU_{23}	—	November 19, 2009	Catalina	CSS	·	930 m	MPC · JPL
633640	2009 WB_{26}	—	November 21, 2009	Kitt Peak	Spacewatch	T_{j} (2.92)	5.1 km	MPC · JPL
633641	2009 WK_{31}	—	February 17, 2007	Kitt Peak	Spacewatch	MAS	660 m	MPC · JPL
633642	2009 WO_{35}	—	September 15, 2004	Kitt Peak	Spacewatch	·	2.1 km	MPC · JPL
633643	2009 WU_{35}	—	September 15, 2009	Kitt Peak	Spacewatch	·	1.6 km	MPC · JPL
633644	2009 WY_{36}	—	August 5, 2005	Palomar	NEAT	MAS	710 m	MPC · JPL
633645	2009 WD_{37}	—	November 9, 2009	Kitt Peak	Spacewatch	·	1.9 km	MPC · JPL
633646	2009 WW_{37}	—	January 23, 2006	Kitt Peak	Spacewatch	·	1.9 km	MPC · JPL
633647	2009 WQ_{38}	—	September 30, 2009	Mount Lemmon	Mount Lemmon Survey	·	3.1 km	MPC · JPL
633648	2009 WA_{39}	—	November 17, 2009	Kitt Peak	Spacewatch	·	830 m	MPC · JPL
633649	2009 WH_{42}	—	November 17, 2009	Mount Lemmon	Mount Lemmon Survey	·	1.3 km	MPC · JPL
633650	2009 WW_{45}	—	December 12, 2006	Mount Lemmon	Mount Lemmon Survey	·	670 m	MPC · JPL
633651	2009 WO_{46}	—	December 29, 2000	Kitt Peak	Spacewatch	·	2.3 km	MPC · JPL
633652	2009 WP_{48}	—	November 19, 2009	Mount Lemmon	Mount Lemmon Survey	·	1.9 km	MPC · JPL
633653	2009 WQ_{55}	—	December 24, 2005	Kitt Peak	Spacewatch	AGN	1.3 km	MPC · JPL
633654	2009 WB_{56}	—	November 16, 2009	Mount Lemmon	Mount Lemmon Survey	·	1.7 km	MPC · JPL
633655	2009 WB_{58}	—	November 16, 2009	Mount Lemmon	Mount Lemmon Survey	·	2.1 km	MPC · JPL
633656	2009 WD_{62}	—	February 6, 2002	Kitt Peak	Deep Ecliptic Survey	·	1.7 km	MPC · JPL
633657	2009 WM_{63}	—	October 24, 2001	Palomar	NEAT	·	1.7 km	MPC · JPL
633658	2009 WJ_{64}	—	May 26, 2007	Mount Lemmon	Mount Lemmon Survey	·	3.2 km	MPC · JPL
633659	2009 WH_{67}	—	March 11, 2007	Kitt Peak	Spacewatch	·	2.1 km	MPC · JPL
633660	2009 WO_{69}	—	August 30, 2005	Anderson Mesa	LONEOS	V	650 m	MPC · JPL
633661	2009 WN_{70}	—	November 10, 2009	Kitt Peak	Spacewatch	·	1.6 km	MPC · JPL
633662	2009 WU_{71}	—	November 18, 2009	Kitt Peak	Spacewatch	·	1.2 km	MPC · JPL
633663	2009 WA_{78}	—	November 10, 2009	Kitt Peak	Spacewatch	·	2.1 km	MPC · JPL
633664	2009 WR_{82}	—	November 11, 2009	Kitt Peak	Spacewatch	·	1.3 km	MPC · JPL
633665	2009 WZ_{91}	—	July 29, 2005	Palomar	NEAT	·	1.1 km	MPC · JPL
633666	2009 WD_{92}	—	February 8, 2007	Mount Lemmon	Mount Lemmon Survey	·	830 m	MPC · JPL
633667	2009 WA_{97}	—	November 20, 2009	Mount Lemmon	Mount Lemmon Survey	·	1.2 km	MPC · JPL
633668	2009 WN_{97}	—	November 20, 2009	Mount Lemmon	Mount Lemmon Survey	AGN	1.1 km	MPC · JPL
633669	2009 WQ_{98}	—	October 12, 2009	Mount Lemmon	Mount Lemmon Survey	V	620 m	MPC · JPL
633670	2009 WO_{108}	—	November 17, 2009	Mount Lemmon	Mount Lemmon Survey	·	1.2 km	MPC · JPL
633671	2009 WY_{108}	—	October 22, 2009	Mount Lemmon	Mount Lemmon Survey	KOR	1.1 km	MPC · JPL
633672	2009 WH_{113}	—	September 26, 2009	Kitt Peak	Spacewatch	L4	8.2 km	MPC · JPL
633673	2009 WX_{113}	—	January 6, 2006	Kitt Peak	Spacewatch	HOF	2.2 km	MPC · JPL
633674	2009 WW_{116}	—	November 16, 2009	Kitt Peak	Spacewatch	·	1.2 km	MPC · JPL
633675	2009 WZ_{119}	—	September 19, 1998	Apache Point	SDSS	·	830 m	MPC · JPL
633676	2009 WV_{121}	—	November 20, 2009	Kitt Peak	Spacewatch	·	1.8 km	MPC · JPL
633677	2009 WL_{122}	—	November 20, 2009	Kitt Peak	Spacewatch	·	660 m	MPC · JPL
633678	2009 WL_{124}	—	October 16, 2009	Mount Lemmon	Mount Lemmon Survey	·	2.3 km	MPC · JPL
633679	2009 WV_{124}	—	November 20, 2009	Kitt Peak	Spacewatch	KOR	1.4 km	MPC · JPL
633680	2009 WZ_{126}	—	November 9, 1999	Kitt Peak	Spacewatch	KOR	1.2 km	MPC · JPL
633681	2009 WJ_{132}	—	July 29, 2008	Mount Lemmon	Mount Lemmon Survey	·	2.2 km	MPC · JPL
633682	2009 WX_{132}	—	November 7, 2005	Mauna Kea	A. Boattini	·	1.6 km	MPC · JPL
633683	2009 WN_{137}	—	November 23, 2009	Mount Lemmon	Mount Lemmon Survey	·	1.5 km	MPC · JPL
633684	2009 WZ_{137}	—	October 25, 2009	Kitt Peak	Spacewatch	·	2.3 km	MPC · JPL
633685	2009 WK_{141}	—	May 15, 2001	Badlands	Dyvig, R.	·	1.2 km	MPC · JPL
633686	2009 WT_{143}	—	September 22, 2004	Kitt Peak	Spacewatch	KOR	1.2 km	MPC · JPL
633687	2009 WT_{144}	—	August 12, 2004	Cerro Tololo	Deep Ecliptic Survey	·	1.6 km	MPC · JPL
633688	2009 WS_{148}	—	March 15, 2007	Mount Lemmon	Mount Lemmon Survey	·	2.4 km	MPC · JPL
633689	2009 WX_{149}	—	February 2, 2006	Kitt Peak	Spacewatch	·	1.8 km	MPC · JPL
633690	2009 WW_{152}	—	September 13, 2005	Kitt Peak	Spacewatch	V	570 m	MPC · JPL
633691	2009 WR_{153}	—	November 19, 2009	Mount Lemmon	Mount Lemmon Survey	·	1.9 km	MPC · JPL
633692	2009 WT_{154}	—	November 19, 2009	Mount Lemmon	Mount Lemmon Survey	·	800 m	MPC · JPL
633693	2009 WB_{156}	—	November 20, 2009	Kitt Peak	Spacewatch	·	740 m	MPC · JPL
633694	2009 WP_{156}	—	November 16, 2009	Kitt Peak	Spacewatch	EOS	1.9 km	MPC · JPL
633695	2009 WK_{158}	—	November 20, 2009	Mount Lemmon	Mount Lemmon Survey	·	1.6 km	MPC · JPL
633696	2009 WT_{159}	—	November 11, 2009	Kitt Peak	Spacewatch	·	1.2 km	MPC · JPL
633697	2009 WZ_{159}	—	July 29, 2005	Palomar	NEAT	V	500 m	MPC · JPL
633698	2009 WZ_{161}	—	November 17, 2009	Kitt Peak	Spacewatch	·	870 m	MPC · JPL
633699	2009 WH_{162}	—	September 7, 2008	Mount Lemmon	Mount Lemmon Survey	·	2.1 km	MPC · JPL
633700	2009 WQ_{163}	—	November 21, 2009	Kitt Peak	Spacewatch	·	2.2 km	MPC · JPL

== 633701–633800 ==
back to top

Designation			Discovery			Properties		Ref
Permanent	Provisional	Named after	Date	Site	Discoverer(s)	Category	Diam.	Ref
633701	2009 WK_{165}	—	November 21, 2009	Catalina	CSS	·	1.1 km	MPC · JPL
633702	2009 WU_{165}	—	December 3, 2005	Mauna Kea	A. Boattini	KOR	1.4 km	MPC · JPL
633703	2009 WY_{174}	—	September 29, 2009	Mount Lemmon	Mount Lemmon Survey	·	990 m	MPC · JPL
633704	2009 WC_{176}	—	November 23, 2009	Kitt Peak	Spacewatch	·	1.8 km	MPC · JPL
633705	2009 WV_{177}	—	June 30, 2005	Kitt Peak	Spacewatch	·	1.1 km	MPC · JPL
633706	2009 WZ_{181}	—	April 20, 2007	Kitt Peak	Spacewatch	·	2.6 km	MPC · JPL
633707	2009 WZ_{188}	—	November 24, 2009	Mount Lemmon	Mount Lemmon Survey	V	560 m	MPC · JPL
633708	2009 WG_{194}	—	November 24, 2009	Kitt Peak	Spacewatch	·	730 m	MPC · JPL
633709	2009 WW_{195}	—	October 24, 2009	Kitt Peak	Spacewatch	KOR	1.2 km	MPC · JPL
633710	2009 WA_{197}	—	August 29, 2005	Palomar	NEAT	V	680 m	MPC · JPL
633711	2009 WV_{198}	—	November 26, 2009	Mount Lemmon	Mount Lemmon Survey	·	1.8 km	MPC · JPL
633712	2009 WN_{199}	—	November 18, 2009	Mount Lemmon	Mount Lemmon Survey	·	2.4 km	MPC · JPL
633713	2009 WJ_{201}	—	November 16, 2009	Mount Lemmon	Mount Lemmon Survey	EOS	1.8 km	MPC · JPL
633714	2009 WW_{201}	—	November 26, 2009	Mount Lemmon	Mount Lemmon Survey	V	640 m	MPC · JPL
633715	2009 WG_{202}	—	November 26, 2009	Mount Lemmon	Mount Lemmon Survey	·	970 m	MPC · JPL
633716	2009 WJ_{202}	—	January 27, 2007	Mount Lemmon	Mount Lemmon Survey	·	680 m	MPC · JPL
633717	2009 WX_{203}	—	November 16, 2009	Kitt Peak	Spacewatch	·	1.8 km	MPC · JPL
633718	2009 WF_{204}	—	November 16, 2009	Kitt Peak	Spacewatch	·	1.1 km	MPC · JPL
633719	2009 WM_{204}	—	October 26, 2009	Kitt Peak	Spacewatch	·	1.8 km	MPC · JPL
633720	2009 WU_{204}	—	November 17, 2009	Kitt Peak	Spacewatch	HOF	2.1 km	MPC · JPL
633721	2009 WZ_{204}	—	October 22, 2009	Mount Lemmon	Mount Lemmon Survey	·	3.5 km	MPC · JPL
633722	2009 WJ_{205}	—	November 17, 2009	Kitt Peak	Spacewatch	·	730 m	MPC · JPL
633723	2009 WV_{205}	—	September 21, 2009	Mount Lemmon	Mount Lemmon Survey	·	2.7 km	MPC · JPL
633724	2009 WA_{206}	—	January 10, 2007	Mount Lemmon	Mount Lemmon Survey	·	790 m	MPC · JPL
633725	2009 WW_{213}	—	August 20, 1995	Kitt Peak	Spacewatch	·	900 m	MPC · JPL
633726	2009 WL_{218}	—	November 16, 2009	Mount Lemmon	Mount Lemmon Survey	·	2.1 km	MPC · JPL
633727	2009 WH_{221}	—	November 16, 2009	Mount Lemmon	Mount Lemmon Survey	·	1.6 km	MPC · JPL
633728	2009 WD_{222}	—	January 24, 2007	Mount Lemmon	Mount Lemmon Survey	·	630 m	MPC · JPL
633729	2009 WH_{222}	—	November 16, 2009	Mount Lemmon	Mount Lemmon Survey	HOF	2.2 km	MPC · JPL
633730	2009 WU_{223}	—	November 7, 2005	Mauna Kea	A. Boattini	·	1.5 km	MPC · JPL
633731	2009 WW_{224}	—	October 11, 2004	Kitt Peak	Deep Ecliptic Survey	KOR	1.4 km	MPC · JPL
633732	2009 WG_{227}	—	November 17, 2009	Mount Lemmon	Mount Lemmon Survey	·	900 m	MPC · JPL
633733	2009 WT_{230}	—	October 5, 2004	Kitt Peak	Spacewatch	AGN	900 m	MPC · JPL
633734	2009 WX_{231}	—	November 17, 2009	Mount Lemmon	Mount Lemmon Survey	·	2.3 km	MPC · JPL
633735	2009 WP_{234}	—	November 19, 2009	Kitt Peak	Spacewatch	·	1.7 km	MPC · JPL
633736	2009 WB_{236}	—	September 30, 2003	Kitt Peak	Spacewatch	·	2.0 km	MPC · JPL
633737	2009 WO_{237}	—	April 14, 2004	Kitt Peak	Spacewatch	·	830 m	MPC · JPL
633738	2009 WW_{237}	—	November 17, 2009	Kitt Peak	Spacewatch	KOR	1.2 km	MPC · JPL
633739	2009 WB_{241}	—	November 18, 2009	Kitt Peak	Spacewatch	·	2.4 km	MPC · JPL
633740	2009 WH_{241}	—	July 28, 2005	Palomar	NEAT	·	1.1 km	MPC · JPL
633741	2009 WY_{241}	—	November 18, 2009	Mount Lemmon	Mount Lemmon Survey	·	2.9 km	MPC · JPL
633742	2009 WZ_{241}	—	November 18, 2009	Mount Lemmon	Mount Lemmon Survey	·	1.9 km	MPC · JPL
633743	2009 WA_{242}	—	November 18, 2009	Kitt Peak	Spacewatch	AGN	960 m	MPC · JPL
633744	2009 WL_{243}	—	March 13, 2007	Mount Lemmon	Mount Lemmon Survey	·	680 m	MPC · JPL
633745	2009 WM_{245}	—	February 21, 2003	Kvistaberg	Uppsala-DLR Asteroid Survey	MAS	680 m	MPC · JPL
633746	2009 WH_{247}	—	February 21, 2007	Mount Lemmon	Mount Lemmon Survey	·	960 m	MPC · JPL
633747	2009 WK_{248}	—	December 25, 2005	Kitt Peak	Spacewatch	·	2.0 km	MPC · JPL
633748	2009 WM_{253}	—	March 19, 2007	Mount Lemmon	Mount Lemmon Survey	·	1.3 km	MPC · JPL
633749	2009 WT_{254}	—	August 5, 2005	Palomar	NEAT	(2076)	910 m	MPC · JPL
633750	2009 WL_{255}	—	September 23, 2008	Kitt Peak	Spacewatch	·	5.5 km	MPC · JPL
633751	2009 WJ_{256}	—	May 26, 2003	Kitt Peak	Spacewatch	·	2.5 km	MPC · JPL
633752	2009 WE_{257}	—	November 25, 2009	Kitt Peak	Spacewatch	·	1.2 km	MPC · JPL
633753	2009 WV_{257}	—	November 26, 2009	Mount Lemmon	Mount Lemmon Survey	KOR	1.1 km	MPC · JPL
633754	2009 WY_{257}	—	February 24, 2006	Kitt Peak	Spacewatch	·	1.5 km	MPC · JPL
633755	2009 WB_{262}	—	November 18, 2009	Kitt Peak	Spacewatch	KOR	1.1 km	MPC · JPL
633756	2009 WC_{271}	—	June 19, 2015	Haleakala	Pan-STARRS 1	·	1.2 km	MPC · JPL
633757	2009 WF_{272}	—	November 22, 2009	Kitt Peak	Spacewatch	·	1.3 km	MPC · JPL
633758	2009 WL_{273}	—	November 24, 2009	Kitt Peak	Spacewatch	·	1.3 km	MPC · JPL
633759	2009 WO_{273}	—	January 26, 2014	Haleakala	Pan-STARRS 1	·	850 m	MPC · JPL
633760	2009 WS_{278}	—	November 23, 2009	Kitt Peak	Spacewatch	·	800 m	MPC · JPL
633761	2009 WA_{281}	—	February 9, 2011	Mount Lemmon	Mount Lemmon Survey	·	1.6 km	MPC · JPL
633762	2009 WF_{284}	—	June 15, 2015	Haleakala	Pan-STARRS 1	·	610 m	MPC · JPL
633763	2009 WT_{285}	—	November 17, 2009	Mount Lemmon	Mount Lemmon Survey	·	2.4 km	MPC · JPL
633764	2009 WZ_{285}	—	April 23, 2015	Haleakala	Pan-STARRS 1	·	830 m	MPC · JPL
633765	2009 WO_{289}	—	November 16, 2009	Mount Lemmon	Mount Lemmon Survey	·	1.7 km	MPC · JPL
633766	2009 WQ_{289}	—	November 21, 2009	Kitt Peak	Spacewatch	KOR	1.1 km	MPC · JPL
633767	2009 XM	—	December 6, 2009	Bisei	BATTeRS	·	2.3 km	MPC · JPL
633768	2009 XG_{4}	—	January 31, 2006	Kitt Peak	Spacewatch	KOR	1.4 km	MPC · JPL
633769	2009 XU_{6}	—	February 25, 2006	Catalina Station	C. W. Hergenrother, Smith, A. C.	·	2.4 km	MPC · JPL
633770	2009 XM_{8}	—	December 14, 2009	Tzec Maun	E. Schwab	·	2.3 km	MPC · JPL
633771	2009 XO_{8}	—	October 1, 2003	Anderson Mesa	LONEOS	·	3.7 km	MPC · JPL
633772	2009 XA_{11}	—	March 26, 2003	Palomar	NEAT	·	1.4 km	MPC · JPL
633773	2009 XB_{12}	—	November 24, 2009	Kitt Peak	Spacewatch	·	980 m	MPC · JPL
633774	2009 XE_{20}	—	December 12, 2009	Pla D'Arguines	R. Ferrando, Ferrando, M.	·	2.8 km	MPC · JPL
633775	2009 XU_{22}	—	December 10, 2009	Mount Lemmon	Mount Lemmon Survey	·	2.1 km	MPC · JPL
633776	2009 XG_{23}	—	August 26, 2005	Anderson Mesa	LONEOS	·	1.2 km	MPC · JPL
633777	2009 XV_{28}	—	December 13, 2009	Mount Lemmon	Mount Lemmon Survey	HOF	1.9 km	MPC · JPL
633778	2009 YM_{3}	—	December 17, 2009	Mount Lemmon	Mount Lemmon Survey	·	1.6 km	MPC · JPL
633779	2009 YS_{5}	—	February 2, 2000	Kitt Peak	Spacewatch	·	920 m	MPC · JPL
633780	2009 YK_{8}	—	December 13, 2004	Kitt Peak	Spacewatch	TEL	1.4 km	MPC · JPL
633781	2009 YZ_{8}	—	February 4, 2000	Kitt Peak	Spacewatch	·	1.6 km	MPC · JPL
633782	2009 YN_{10}	—	September 21, 2009	Mount Lemmon	Mount Lemmon Survey	·	750 m	MPC · JPL
633783	2009 YQ_{12}	—	September 7, 2008	Mount Lemmon	Mount Lemmon Survey	·	1.5 km	MPC · JPL
633784	2009 YL_{13}	—	October 6, 2008	Mount Lemmon	Mount Lemmon Survey	·	2.3 km	MPC · JPL
633785	2009 YS_{16}	—	October 17, 2003	Anderson Mesa	LONEOS	EOS	2.5 km	MPC · JPL
633786	2009 YN_{19}	—	December 17, 2009	Kitt Peak	Spacewatch	EOS	1.9 km	MPC · JPL
633787	2009 YK_{27}	—	March 30, 2015	Haleakala	Pan-STARRS 1	V	540 m	MPC · JPL
633788	2009 YK_{29}	—	June 6, 2018	Haleakala	Pan-STARRS 1	V	480 m	MPC · JPL
633789	2010 AC_{26}	—	January 6, 2010	Kitt Peak	Spacewatch	·	1.3 km	MPC · JPL
633790	2010 AR_{48}	—	November 17, 2000	Kitt Peak	Spacewatch	·	1.5 km	MPC · JPL
633791	2010 AU_{48}	—	November 3, 2008	Catalina	CSS	·	2.0 km	MPC · JPL
633792	2010 AQ_{51}	—	October 1, 2008	Mount Lemmon	Mount Lemmon Survey	·	2.0 km	MPC · JPL
633793	2010 AL_{62}	—	September 5, 2008	Kitt Peak	Spacewatch	·	1.3 km	MPC · JPL
633794	2010 AE_{140}	—	March 3, 2006	Mount Lemmon	Mount Lemmon Survey	·	1.6 km	MPC · JPL
633795	2010 AA_{143}	—	February 5, 1995	Kitt Peak	Spacewatch	NYS	1.1 km	MPC · JPL
633796	2010 AF_{143}	—	January 7, 2010	Kitt Peak	Spacewatch	·	1.4 km	MPC · JPL
633797	2010 AK_{159}	—	December 31, 2013	Kitt Peak	Spacewatch	V	560 m	MPC · JPL
633798	2010 AH_{163}	—	January 8, 2010	Kitt Peak	Spacewatch	MAS	590 m	MPC · JPL
633799	2010 AM_{163}	—	January 6, 2010	Kitt Peak	Spacewatch	EOS	1.7 km	MPC · JPL
633800	2010 CQ	—	February 3, 2010	Marly	P. Kocher	·	1.5 km	MPC · JPL

== 633801–633900 ==
back to top

Designation			Discovery			Properties		Ref
Permanent	Provisional	Named after	Date	Site	Discoverer(s)	Category	Diam.	Ref
633801	2010 CV_{24}	—	September 22, 2008	Mount Lemmon	Mount Lemmon Survey	KOR	1.3 km	MPC · JPL
633802	2010 CP_{30}	—	February 9, 2010	Mount Lemmon	Mount Lemmon Survey	EOS	1.6 km	MPC · JPL
633803	2010 CJ_{33}	—	February 10, 2010	Kitt Peak	Spacewatch	NYS	880 m	MPC · JPL
633804	2010 CU_{36}	—	December 5, 2005	Kitt Peak	Spacewatch	MAS	770 m	MPC · JPL
633805	2010 CS_{55}	—	February 12, 2010	Socorro	LINEAR	·	1.3 km	MPC · JPL
633806	2010 CB_{66}	—	January 11, 2010	Kitt Peak	Spacewatch	EUN	1.3 km	MPC · JPL
633807	2010 CK_{71}	—	May 22, 2003	Kitt Peak	Spacewatch	V	620 m	MPC · JPL
633808	2010 CY_{73}	—	September 21, 2003	Palomar	NEAT	·	2.2 km	MPC · JPL
633809	2010 CD_{77}	—	February 13, 2010	Mount Lemmon	Mount Lemmon Survey	·	1.8 km	MPC · JPL
633810	2010 CZ_{77}	—	February 13, 2010	Mount Lemmon	Mount Lemmon Survey	·	640 m	MPC · JPL
633811	2010 CF_{86}	—	February 14, 2010	Mount Lemmon	Mount Lemmon Survey	·	3.2 km	MPC · JPL
633812	2010 CY_{92}	—	April 3, 1998	Kitt Peak	Spacewatch	·	1.1 km	MPC · JPL
633813	2010 CE_{103}	—	September 10, 2007	Mount Lemmon	Mount Lemmon Survey	·	1.4 km	MPC · JPL
633814	2010 CN_{105}	—	August 10, 2007	Kitt Peak	Spacewatch	·	1.8 km	MPC · JPL
633815	2010 CJ_{114}	—	November 6, 2008	Mount Lemmon	Mount Lemmon Survey	MAS	720 m	MPC · JPL
633816	2010 CG_{125}	—	April 18, 2002	Kitt Peak	Spacewatch	·	970 m	MPC · JPL
633817	2010 CO_{169}	—	July 18, 2007	Mount Lemmon	Mount Lemmon Survey	MRX	1.0 km	MPC · JPL
633818	2010 CY_{174}	—	February 9, 2010	Kitt Peak	Spacewatch	·	2.3 km	MPC · JPL
633819	2010 CC_{252}	—	January 28, 2015	Haleakala	Pan-STARRS 1	L4	7.9 km	MPC · JPL
633820	2010 CX_{253}	—	February 27, 2006	Kitt Peak	Spacewatch	·	3.0 km	MPC · JPL
633821	2010 CA_{275}	—	February 14, 2010	Mount Lemmon	Mount Lemmon Survey	·	1.9 km	MPC · JPL
633822	2010 CF_{276}	—	February 10, 2010	Kitt Peak	Spacewatch	KOR	1.3 km	MPC · JPL
633823	2010 DD_{10}	—	December 1, 2008	Mount Lemmon	Mount Lemmon Survey	EOS	1.5 km	MPC · JPL
633824	2010 DR_{48}	—	September 30, 2003	Kitt Peak	Spacewatch	·	1.7 km	MPC · JPL
633825	2010 DC_{50}	—	February 16, 2010	Mount Lemmon	Mount Lemmon Survey	·	1.6 km	MPC · JPL
633826	2010 DH_{50}	—	March 5, 2016	Haleakala	Pan-STARRS 1	·	1.7 km	MPC · JPL
633827	2010 DZ_{73}	—	March 17, 2002	Kitt Peak	Spacewatch	·	1.0 km	MPC · JPL
633828	2010 DT_{75}	—	September 18, 2003	Kitt Peak	Spacewatch	·	1.6 km	MPC · JPL
633829	2010 EU_{32}	—	March 4, 2010	Kitt Peak	Spacewatch	·	1.1 km	MPC · JPL
633830	2010 EG_{37}	—	April 2, 2006	Kitt Peak	Spacewatch	·	1.0 km	MPC · JPL
633831	2010 EG_{76}	—	March 11, 2005	Kitt Peak	Spacewatch	·	2.3 km	MPC · JPL
633832	2010 EW_{79}	—	November 19, 2003	Kitt Peak	Spacewatch	·	1.8 km	MPC · JPL
633833	2010 EF_{89}	—	March 2, 1995	Kitt Peak	Spacewatch	·	1.1 km	MPC · JPL
633834	2010 EP_{96}	—	May 6, 2006	Mount Lemmon	Mount Lemmon Survey	KOR	1.5 km	MPC · JPL
633835	2010 EX_{101}	—	August 24, 2007	Kitt Peak	Spacewatch	·	1.7 km	MPC · JPL
633836	2010 EX_{102}	—	May 6, 2006	Mount Lemmon	Mount Lemmon Survey	·	1.1 km	MPC · JPL
633837	2010 EJ_{109}	—	September 28, 2003	Kitt Peak	Spacewatch	KOR	1.6 km	MPC · JPL
633838	2010 EV_{109}	—	January 16, 2005	Kitt Peak	Spacewatch	·	2.2 km	MPC · JPL
633839	2010 EG_{113}	—	October 29, 2003	Kitt Peak	Spacewatch	·	1.9 km	MPC · JPL
633840	2010 EA_{132}	—	April 2, 2006	Mount Lemmon	Mount Lemmon Survey	·	1.9 km	MPC · JPL
633841	2010 ED_{189}	—	January 4, 2014	Oukaïmeden	C. Rinner	·	2.0 km	MPC · JPL
633842	2010 EG_{189}	—	March 13, 2010	Mount Lemmon	Mount Lemmon Survey	·	2.2 km	MPC · JPL
633843	2010 EQ_{192}	—	December 10, 2018	Mount Lemmon	Mount Lemmon Survey	·	1.7 km	MPC · JPL
633844	2010 FM_{1}	—	March 16, 2010	Mount Lemmon	Mount Lemmon Survey	·	2.3 km	MPC · JPL
633845	2010 FL_{13}	—	March 16, 2010	XuYi	PMO NEO Survey Program	·	3.1 km	MPC · JPL
633846	2010 FS_{83}	—	December 2, 2008	Kitt Peak	Spacewatch	·	1.0 km	MPC · JPL
633847	2010 FY_{97}	—	March 2, 1997	Kitt Peak	Spacewatch	·	1.8 km	MPC · JPL
633848	2010 FD_{136}	—	November 4, 2007	Kitt Peak	Spacewatch	·	1.5 km	MPC · JPL
633849	2010 FM_{141}	—	March 24, 2014	Haleakala	Pan-STARRS 1	·	1.5 km	MPC · JPL
633850	2010 FL_{143}	—	October 4, 2018	Haleakala	Pan-STARRS 2	·	2.1 km	MPC · JPL
633851	2010 FX_{143}	—	March 18, 2010	Kitt Peak	Spacewatch	(5)	970 m	MPC · JPL
633852	2010 FZ_{146}	—	March 18, 2010	Mount Lemmon	Mount Lemmon Survey	·	1.3 km	MPC · JPL
633853	2010 GY_{32}	—	November 21, 2008	Kitt Peak	Spacewatch	EOS	2.3 km	MPC · JPL
633854	2010 GW_{106}	—	April 8, 2010	Kitt Peak	Spacewatch	·	2.8 km	MPC · JPL
633855	2010 GC_{111}	—	April 2, 2005	Mount Lemmon	Mount Lemmon Survey	·	2.1 km	MPC · JPL
633856	2010 GP_{116}	—	April 2, 2006	Kitt Peak	Spacewatch	·	850 m	MPC · JPL
633857	2010 GG_{118}	—	July 25, 2006	Mount Lemmon	Mount Lemmon Survey	·	2.1 km	MPC · JPL
633858	2010 GN_{129}	—	April 6, 2010	Mount Lemmon	Mount Lemmon Survey	·	960 m	MPC · JPL
633859	2010 GD_{134}	—	April 30, 2005	Kitt Peak	Spacewatch	EOS	1.6 km	MPC · JPL
633860	2010 GA_{142}	—	April 9, 2010	Mount Lemmon	Mount Lemmon Survey	THM	1.9 km	MPC · JPL
633861	2010 GQ_{144}	—	October 8, 2007	Mount Lemmon	Mount Lemmon Survey	·	1.4 km	MPC · JPL
633862	2010 GE_{147}	—	April 15, 2010	Catalina	CSS	·	1.1 km	MPC · JPL
633863	2010 GA_{160}	—	October 24, 2003	Kitt Peak	Spacewatch	RAF	880 m	MPC · JPL
633864	2010 GP_{160}	—	October 24, 2003	Kitt Peak	Spacewatch	·	2.6 km	MPC · JPL
633865	2010 GH_{171}	—	April 30, 2016	Haleakala	Pan-STARRS 1	·	2.4 km	MPC · JPL
633866	2010 GA_{177}	—	April 13, 2010	Mount Lemmon	Mount Lemmon Survey	·	1.1 km	MPC · JPL
633867	2010 GK_{192}	—	October 11, 2012	Haleakala	Pan-STARRS 1	·	960 m	MPC · JPL
633868	2010 GZ_{199}	—	October 15, 2012	Mount Lemmon	Mount Lemmon Survey	EOS	1.5 km	MPC · JPL
633869	2010 GM_{209}	—	April 15, 2010	Kitt Peak	Spacewatch	·	2.8 km	MPC · JPL
633870	2010 GQ_{209}	—	November 2, 2007	Mount Lemmon	Mount Lemmon Survey	·	2.3 km	MPC · JPL
633871	2010 GB_{210}	—	February 14, 2002	Kitt Peak	Spacewatch	MAS	610 m	MPC · JPL
633872	2010 HD_{1}	—	March 10, 2007	Kitt Peak	Spacewatch	L5	9.0 km	MPC · JPL
633873	2010 HN_{24}	—	April 18, 2010	WISE	WISE	L5	9.2 km	MPC · JPL
633874	2010 HK_{105}	—	November 19, 2007	Kitt Peak	Spacewatch	EOS	1.9 km	MPC · JPL
633875	2010 HP_{105}	—	April 11, 2010	Kitt Peak	Spacewatch	(5)	1.0 km	MPC · JPL
633876	2010 HM_{106}	—	August 25, 2006	Lulin	LUSS	EOS	1.9 km	MPC · JPL
633877	2010 HH_{116}	—	May 29, 2009	Mount Lemmon	Mount Lemmon Survey	L5	7.2 km	MPC · JPL
633878	2010 HT_{120}	—	October 30, 2008	Kitt Peak	Spacewatch	3:2	4.9 km	MPC · JPL
633879	2010 HH_{128}	—	January 16, 2013	Haleakala	Pan-STARRS 1	·	2.5 km	MPC · JPL
633880	2010 JH_{30}	—	November 19, 2003	Kitt Peak	Spacewatch	EUN	1.4 km	MPC · JPL
633881	2010 JF_{47}	—	May 10, 2010	Mount Lemmon	Mount Lemmon Survey	·	1.0 km	MPC · JPL
633882	2010 JZ_{72}	—	May 6, 2010	Kitt Peak	Spacewatch	EOS	2.0 km	MPC · JPL
633883	2010 JA_{113}	—	September 11, 2007	Mount Lemmon	Mount Lemmon Survey	(5)	1.3 km	MPC · JPL
633884	2010 JA_{154}	—	May 5, 2010	Mount Lemmon	Mount Lemmon Survey	·	780 m	MPC · JPL
633885	2010 JH_{157}	—	May 11, 2010	Kitt Peak	Spacewatch	·	1.2 km	MPC · JPL
633886	2010 JX_{158}	—	January 15, 2008	Mount Lemmon	Mount Lemmon Survey	·	2.2 km	MPC · JPL
633887	2010 JE_{161}	—	October 9, 2007	Mount Lemmon	Mount Lemmon Survey	EOS	1.8 km	MPC · JPL
633888	2010 JJ_{162}	—	May 8, 2010	Mount Lemmon	Mount Lemmon Survey	·	2.2 km	MPC · JPL
633889	2010 JZ_{191}	—	September 9, 2007	Kitt Peak	Spacewatch	3:2	5.9 km	MPC · JPL
633890	2010 JX_{204}	—	March 7, 2014	Mount Lemmon	Mount Lemmon Survey	CLA	1.2 km	MPC · JPL
633891	2010 JH_{215}	—	May 7, 2010	Kitt Peak	Spacewatch	·	2.7 km	MPC · JPL
633892	2010 KB	—	May 16, 2010	Mount Lemmon	Mount Lemmon Survey	L5	10 km	MPC · JPL
633893	2010 KB_{130}	—	April 6, 2010	Kitt Peak	Spacewatch	·	890 m	MPC · JPL
633894	2010 KL_{160}	—	May 19, 2010	Mount Lemmon	Mount Lemmon Survey	ADE	1.8 km	MPC · JPL
633895	2010 LP_{1}	—	April 6, 2005	Anderson Mesa	LONEOS	·	2.7 km	MPC · JPL
633896	2010 LX_{133}	—	January 1, 2009	Mount Lemmon	Mount Lemmon Survey	·	2.3 km	MPC · JPL
633897	2010 LL_{146}	—	September 9, 2007	Kitt Peak	Spacewatch	·	800 m	MPC · JPL
633898	2010 LO_{153}	—	June 12, 2010	WISE	WISE	·	1.8 km	MPC · JPL
633899	2010 LR_{158}	—	November 22, 2014	Haleakala	Pan-STARRS 1	L5	8.6 km	MPC · JPL
633900	2010 MO_{4}	—	June 21, 2010	Kitt Peak	Spacewatch	·	1.2 km	MPC · JPL

== 633901–634000 ==
back to top

Designation			Discovery			Properties		Ref
Permanent	Provisional	Named after	Date	Site	Discoverer(s)	Category	Diam.	Ref
633901	2010 MG_{112}	—	June 19, 2010	Mount Lemmon	Mount Lemmon Survey	·	1.4 km	MPC · JPL
633902	2010 MK_{113}	—	August 9, 2000	Kitt Peak	Spacewatch	·	3.1 km	MPC · JPL
633903	2010 MY_{118}	—	November 1, 2006	Mount Lemmon	Mount Lemmon Survey	·	1.6 km	MPC · JPL
633904	2010 NJ_{146}	—	September 29, 2011	Mount Lemmon	Mount Lemmon Survey	·	3.1 km	MPC · JPL
633905	2010 NC_{147}	—	June 21, 2010	Mount Lemmon	Mount Lemmon Survey	L5	8.8 km	MPC · JPL
633906	2010 NH_{147}	—	October 8, 2012	Mount Lemmon	Mount Lemmon Survey	L5	7.8 km	MPC · JPL
633907	2010 NU_{147}	—	July 4, 2010	Mount Lemmon	Mount Lemmon Survey	L5	9.7 km	MPC · JPL
633908	2010 PV_{88}	—	September 23, 2015	Haleakala	Pan-STARRS 1	·	1.2 km	MPC · JPL
633909 Lazutkin	2010 QH_{2}	Lazutkin	August 31, 2010	Zelenchukskaya Stn	T. V. Krjačko, Satovski, B.	H	550 m	MPC · JPL
633910	2010 QA_{7}	—	August 29, 2005	Palomar	NEAT	·	3.0 km	MPC · JPL
633911	2010 QC_{7}	—	November 28, 2011	Kitt Peak	Spacewatch	·	2.2 km	MPC · JPL
633912	2010 RD_{1}	—	September 7, 2000	Kitt Peak	Spacewatch	·	1.6 km	MPC · JPL
633913	2010 RL_{5}	—	September 15, 2006	Kitt Peak	Spacewatch	·	940 m	MPC · JPL
633914	2010 RL_{31}	—	October 2, 2006	Mount Lemmon	Mount Lemmon Survey	·	1.8 km	MPC · JPL
633915	2010 RN_{31}	—	February 8, 2008	Kitt Peak	Spacewatch	·	3.2 km	MPC · JPL
633916	2010 RT_{35}	—	April 2, 2009	Mount Lemmon	Mount Lemmon Survey	·	1.3 km	MPC · JPL
633917	2010 RC_{48}	—	September 4, 2010	Kitt Peak	Spacewatch	·	940 m	MPC · JPL
633918	2010 RX_{65}	—	June 27, 2001	Palomar	NEAT	JUN	1.1 km	MPC · JPL
633919	2010 RG_{81}	—	August 26, 2005	Palomar	NEAT	·	2.3 km	MPC · JPL
633920	2010 RE_{96}	—	September 21, 2003	Kitt Peak	Spacewatch	V	810 m	MPC · JPL
633921	2010 RJ_{99}	—	March 21, 2009	Kitt Peak	Spacewatch	·	1.7 km	MPC · JPL
633922	2010 RS_{101}	—	February 4, 2009	Kitt Peak	Spacewatch	·	680 m	MPC · JPL
633923	2010 RK_{102}	—	September 10, 2010	Kitt Peak	Spacewatch	·	460 m	MPC · JPL
633924	2010 RG_{119}	—	September 12, 2010	Charleston	R. Holmes	·	1.0 km	MPC · JPL
633925	2010 RN_{129}	—	April 21, 2006	Catalina	CSS	·	740 m	MPC · JPL
633926	2010 RP_{132}	—	September 15, 2010	Mount Lemmon	Mount Lemmon Survey	RAF	710 m	MPC · JPL
633927	2010 RX_{132}	—	September 15, 2010	Mount Lemmon	Mount Lemmon Survey	·	3.0 km	MPC · JPL
633928	2010 RP_{137}	—	December 4, 2005	Kitt Peak	Spacewatch	·	3.9 km	MPC · JPL
633929	2010 RM_{139}	—	April 10, 2013	Haleakala	Pan-STARRS 1	·	690 m	MPC · JPL
633930	2010 RH_{144}	—	September 14, 2010	Kitt Peak	Spacewatch	·	1.5 km	MPC · JPL
633931	2010 RP_{168}	—	September 2, 2010	Mount Lemmon	Mount Lemmon Survey	·	1.7 km	MPC · JPL
633932	2010 RK_{177}	—	September 11, 2010	Kitt Peak	Spacewatch	·	580 m	MPC · JPL
633933	2010 RX_{183}	—	April 1, 2009	Mount Lemmon	Mount Lemmon Survey	·	1.7 km	MPC · JPL
633934	2010 RQ_{184}	—	October 17, 2010	Mount Lemmon	Mount Lemmon Survey	·	1.6 km	MPC · JPL
633935	2010 RN_{188}	—	September 14, 2010	Mount Lemmon	Mount Lemmon Survey	·	2.8 km	MPC · JPL
633936	2010 RG_{193}	—	August 23, 2014	Haleakala	Pan-STARRS 1	·	970 m	MPC · JPL
633937	2010 RL_{198}	—	March 19, 2017	Mount Lemmon	Mount Lemmon Survey	·	1.0 km	MPC · JPL
633938	2010 RM_{198}	—	January 7, 2017	Mount Lemmon	Mount Lemmon Survey	EUN	1.1 km	MPC · JPL
633939	2010 RN_{204}	—	September 3, 2010	Mount Lemmon	Mount Lemmon Survey	·	1.1 km	MPC · JPL
633940	2010 RF_{214}	—	September 4, 2010	Kitt Peak	Spacewatch	L4	6.7 km	MPC · JPL
633941	2010 SY	—	September 16, 2010	Mount Lemmon	Mount Lemmon Survey	·	2.9 km	MPC · JPL
633942	2010 SB_{2}	—	September 16, 2010	Mount Lemmon	Mount Lemmon Survey	·	1.5 km	MPC · JPL
633943	2010 SC_{13}	—	January 31, 2009	Kitt Peak	Spacewatch	·	660 m	MPC · JPL
633944	2010 SW_{22}	—	September 17, 2010	Mount Lemmon	Mount Lemmon Survey	·	1.2 km	MPC · JPL
633945	2010 SW_{39}	—	September 18, 2010	Mount Lemmon	Mount Lemmon Survey	·	740 m	MPC · JPL
633946	2010 SH_{40}	—	November 16, 2006	Kitt Peak	Spacewatch	·	1.5 km	MPC · JPL
633947	2010 SL_{51}	—	March 29, 2017	Haleakala	Pan-STARRS 1	·	1.1 km	MPC · JPL
633948	2010 TN_{31}	—	September 17, 2010	Kitt Peak	Spacewatch	·	1.1 km	MPC · JPL
633949	2010 TH_{44}	—	October 3, 2010	Charleston	R. Holmes	·	1.5 km	MPC · JPL
633950	2010 TN_{48}	—	September 4, 2010	Kitt Peak	Spacewatch	·	3.4 km	MPC · JPL
633951	2010 TA_{53}	—	October 8, 2010	Kitt Peak	Spacewatch	KOR	1.2 km	MPC · JPL
633952	2010 TX_{61}	—	October 7, 2010	Charleston	R. Holmes	·	1.5 km	MPC · JPL
633953	2010 TW_{63}	—	June 16, 2005	Kitt Peak	Spacewatch	·	1.1 km	MPC · JPL
633954	2010 TE_{67}	—	September 4, 1999	Kitt Peak	Spacewatch	·	3.7 km	MPC · JPL
633955	2010 TA_{71}	—	October 8, 2010	Kitt Peak	Spacewatch	·	540 m	MPC · JPL
633956	2010 TH_{71}	—	March 31, 2009	Kitt Peak	Spacewatch	·	590 m	MPC · JPL
633957	2010 TE_{74}	—	March 27, 2004	Kitt Peak	Spacewatch	·	1.5 km	MPC · JPL
633958	2010 TS_{107}	—	September 4, 2010	Kitt Peak	Spacewatch	V	670 m	MPC · JPL
633959	2010 TF_{118}	—	October 9, 2010	Mount Lemmon	Mount Lemmon Survey	·	1.3 km	MPC · JPL
633960	2010 TW_{128}	—	August 13, 2010	Kitt Peak	Spacewatch	·	1.5 km	MPC · JPL
633961	2010 TG_{136}	—	October 11, 2010	Mount Lemmon	Mount Lemmon Survey	·	3.6 km	MPC · JPL
633962	2010 TE_{148}	—	October 20, 2001	Palomar	NEAT	·	1.8 km	MPC · JPL
633963	2010 TB_{156}	—	October 10, 2010	Kitt Peak	Spacewatch	·	1.3 km	MPC · JPL
633964	2010 TZ_{160}	—	October 10, 2010	Mount Lemmon	Mount Lemmon Survey	·	1.4 km	MPC · JPL
633965	2010 TV_{168}	—	July 29, 2001	Palomar	NEAT	·	1.5 km	MPC · JPL
633966	2010 TK_{196}	—	October 3, 2010	Kitt Peak	Spacewatch	TIR	2.7 km	MPC · JPL
633967	2010 TK_{198}	—	September 2, 2014	Haleakala	Pan-STARRS 1	·	1.3 km	MPC · JPL
633968	2010 TC_{204}	—	September 2, 2014	Haleakala	Pan-STARRS 1	·	1.8 km	MPC · JPL
633969	2010 TA_{219}	—	March 4, 2006	Kitt Peak	Spacewatch	·	530 m	MPC · JPL
633970	2010 TP_{221}	—	October 13, 2010	Mount Lemmon	Mount Lemmon Survey	L4	6.4 km	MPC · JPL
633971	2010 TF_{223}	—	October 14, 2010	Mount Lemmon	Mount Lemmon Survey	·	2.9 km	MPC · JPL
633972	2010 UT_{22}	—	July 4, 2005	Mount Lemmon	Mount Lemmon Survey	·	1.3 km	MPC · JPL
633973	2010 UR_{24}	—	September 18, 2010	Mount Lemmon	Mount Lemmon Survey	·	610 m	MPC · JPL
633974	2010 UH_{38}	—	October 29, 2010	Piszkés-tető	K. Sárneczky, S. Kürti	JUN	910 m	MPC · JPL
633975	2010 UD_{40}	—	October 29, 2010	Piszkés-tető	K. Sárneczky, S. Kürti	·	1.2 km	MPC · JPL
633976	2010 UM_{49}	—	January 13, 2008	Mount Lemmon	Mount Lemmon Survey	·	910 m	MPC · JPL
633977	2010 UO_{77}	—	October 13, 2010	Mount Lemmon	Mount Lemmon Survey	·	720 m	MPC · JPL
633978	2010 UZ_{77}	—	March 8, 2003	Anderson Mesa	LONEOS	·	1.7 km	MPC · JPL
633979	2010 UH_{90}	—	October 31, 2010	Mount Lemmon	Mount Lemmon Survey	·	1.4 km	MPC · JPL
633980	2010 UF_{110}	—	October 17, 2010	Kitt Peak	Spacewatch	ADE	1.9 km	MPC · JPL
633981	2010 UM_{111}	—	March 5, 2013	Haleakala	Pan-STARRS 1	·	2.9 km	MPC · JPL
633982	2010 UE_{119}	—	July 30, 2014	Haleakala	Pan-STARRS 1	WIT	780 m	MPC · JPL
633983	2010 UG_{119}	—	August 3, 2014	Haleakala	Pan-STARRS 1	·	1.2 km	MPC · JPL
633984	2010 UU_{124}	—	October 30, 2010	Mount Lemmon	Mount Lemmon Survey	L4	6.9 km	MPC · JPL
633985	2010 VK_{7}	—	February 8, 2008	Kitt Peak	Spacewatch	·	2.0 km	MPC · JPL
633986	2010 VX_{15}	—	September 22, 2003	Kitt Peak	Spacewatch	·	830 m	MPC · JPL
633987	2010 VJ_{47}	—	August 4, 2005	Palomar	NEAT	·	1.5 km	MPC · JPL
633988	2010 VQ_{63}	—	February 6, 2002	Kitt Peak	Deep Ecliptic Survey	·	530 m	MPC · JPL
633989	2010 VO_{76}	—	November 1, 2010	Mount Lemmon	Mount Lemmon Survey	·	640 m	MPC · JPL
633990	2010 VA_{87}	—	November 6, 2010	Kitt Peak	Spacewatch	·	1.4 km	MPC · JPL
633991	2010 VC_{90}	—	October 21, 2003	Kitt Peak	Spacewatch	·	4.9 km	MPC · JPL
633992	2010 VW_{94}	—	November 7, 2010	Mount Lemmon	Mount Lemmon Survey	·	1.1 km	MPC · JPL
633993	2010 VN_{102}	—	November 5, 2010	Kitt Peak	Spacewatch	·	1.6 km	MPC · JPL
633994	2010 VQ_{120}	—	October 29, 2005	Kitt Peak	Spacewatch	H	650 m	MPC · JPL
633995	2010 VS_{122}	—	October 13, 2010	Mount Lemmon	Mount Lemmon Survey	(5)	960 m	MPC · JPL
633996	2010 VN_{123}	—	October 29, 2010	Mount Lemmon	Mount Lemmon Survey	·	530 m	MPC · JPL
633997	2010 VD_{125}	—	May 24, 2006	Mount Lemmon	Mount Lemmon Survey	·	650 m	MPC · JPL
633998	2010 VE_{132}	—	October 17, 2010	Mount Lemmon	Mount Lemmon Survey	WIT	820 m	MPC · JPL
633999	2010 VH_{137}	—	October 15, 2010	Sandlot	G. Hug	·	1.6 km	MPC · JPL
634000	2010 VC_{138}	—	January 25, 2003	Palomar	NEAT	·	1.7 km	MPC · JPL

back to top

== Meaning of names ==
As minor planet discoveries are confirmed, they are given a permanent number by the IAU's Minor Planet Center (MPC), and the discoverers can then submit names for them, following the IAU's naming conventions. The list below concerns those minor planets in the specified number-range that have received names, and explains the meanings of those names.

Official naming citations of newly named small Solar System bodies are approved and published in a bulletin by IAU's Working Group for Small Bodies Nomenclature (WGSBN). Before May 2021, citations were published in MPC's Minor Planet Circulars for many decades. Recent citations can also be found on the JPL Small-Body Database (SBDB). Until his death in 2016, German astronomer Lutz D. Schmadel compiled these citations into the Dictionary of Minor Planet Names (DMP) and regularly updated the collection.

Based on Paul Herget's The Names of the Minor Planets, Schmadel also researched the unclear origin of numerous asteroids, most of which had been named prior to World War II. This article incorporates text from this source, which is in the public domain: SBDB New namings may only be added to this list below after official publication as the preannouncement of names is condemned. The WGSBN publishes a comprehensive guideline for the naming rules of non-cometary small Solar System bodies.

Named minor planet	Provisional	This minor planet was named for...	Ref · Catalog
633225 Daukša	2009 HB_{59}	Mikalojus Daukša (1527–1613), a Lithuanian and Latin religious writer and a Catholic church official.	IAU · 633225
633326 Allashapovalova	2009 RT_{2}	Alla Shapovalova, Russian astronomer.	IAU · 633326
633348 Shvartsman	2009 SA_{2}	Viktoriy Shvartsman (1945–1987), Soviet astrophysicist who contributed to relativistic astrophysics, cosmology, and the theory of relic radiation.	IAU · 633348
633570 Viktorzagainov	2009 UX_{126}	Viktor Zagainov (1953–2002), Kazakh hot-air balloon pilot and astronomer.	IAU · 633570
633909 Lazutkin	2010 QH_{2}	Aleksandr Ivanovich Lazutkin (born 1957), Russian former pilot-cosmonaut who worked at the Mir Space Station in 1997.	IAU · 633909
