= 3099 Hergenrother =

Main-belt asteroid

Discovery
- Discovered by: Y. Väisälä
- Discovery site: Turku Obs.
- Discovery date: 3 April 1940

Designations
- Named after: Carl Hergenrother (American astronomer)
- Alternative designations: 1940 GF · 1969 EF_{1} 1972 VV · 1979 KE; 1980 NT · 1984 HB; 1984 JG
- Minor planet category: main-belt · (outer)

Orbital characteristics
- Epoch 4 September 2017 (JD 2458000.5)
- Uncertainty parameter 0
- Observation arc: 76.96 yr (28,111 days)
- Aphelion: 3.4563 AU
- Perihelion: 2.3048 AU
- Semi-major axis: 2.8805 AU
- Eccentricity: 0.1999
- Orbital period (sidereal): 4.89 yr (1,786 days)
- Mean anomaly: 309.42°
- Mean motion: 0° 12^{m} 5.76^{s} / day
- Inclination: 15.496°
- Longitude of ascending node: 31.100°
- Argument of perihelion: 148.52°

Physical characteristics
- Dimensions: 14.732±0.110 km 29.21 km (calculated)
- Synodic rotation period: 24.266±0.007 h
- Geometric albedo: 0.057 (assumed); 0.224±0.016
- Spectral type: C
- Absolute magnitude (H): 11.4

3099 Hergenrother, provisional designation 1940 GF, is an asteroid from the outer region of the asteroid belt, approximately 15 kilometers in diameter. It was discovered on 3 April 1940, by Finnish astronomer Yrjö Väisälä at Turku Observatory in Southwest Finland, and named after American astronomer Carl Hergenrother in 1996.

== Orbit and classification ==
Hergenrother orbits the Sun in the outer main-belt at a distance of 2.3–3.5 AU once every 4 years and 11 months (1,786 days). Its orbit has an eccentricity of 0.20 and an inclination of 15° with respect to the ecliptic. The body's observation arc begins 6 days after its official discovery observation at Turku.

== Physical characteristics ==
=== Rotation period ===
In January 2008, a rotational lightcurve of Hergenrother was obtained from photometric observations by French amateur astronomer Pierre Antonini. Lightcurve analysis gave a rotation period of 24.266 hours with a brightness variation of 0.28 magnitude (U=2).

=== Diameter and albedo ===
According to the survey carried out by NASA's Wide-field Infrared Survey Explorer with its subsequent NEOWISE mission, Hergenrother measures 14.73 kilometers in diameter and its surface has an albedo of 0.224, while the Collaborative Asteroid Lightcurve Link assumes a standard albedo for carbonaceous asteroids of 0.057 and consequently calculates a diameter of 29.21 kilometers, as the lower the albedo, the larger the body's diameter at a certain absolute magnitude.

== Naming ==
This minor planet was named in honor of American astronomer Carl W. Hergenrother (born 1973). At Lunar and Planetary Laboratory, he has been a discoverer of minor planets with high inclinations during the Bigelow Sky Survey, precursor to the Catalina Sky Survey. The naming was proposed by MPC director Brian G. Marsden among others. The official naming citation was published by the Minor Planet Center on 3 May 1996 (M.P.C. 27124).
