= Carl W. Hergenrother =

American astronomer (born 1973)

Minor planets discovered: 35
see § List of discovered minor planets

Carl William Hergenrother (born 1973) is an American astronomer and discoverer of minor planets and comets.

Hergenrother has 2 children, 8109 Danielwilliam, and 8711 Lukeasher are named after his children. 7959 Alysecherri, is named after his wife, Alyse.

As credited by the Minor Planet Center, he has discovered and co-discovered 35 numbered asteroids at the Bigelow Sky Survey during 1993–1999. He has also discovered a number of comets including the long-period comet, C/1996 R1 (Hergenrother-Spahr), and three periodic comets, 168P/Hergenrother, 175P/Hergenrother and P/1999 V1 (Catalina). He was also a member of the science and operations team of the 2016-launched OSIRIS-REx spacecraft, a sample return mission to study near-Earth asteroid 101955 Bennu.

The outer main-belt asteroid 3099 Hergenrother was named in his honor on 3 May 1996 (M.P.C. 27124).

== List of discovered minor planets ==
6533 Giuseppina	24 February 1995	list
6613 Williamcarl	2 June 1994	list
7488 Robertpaul	27 May 1995	list
7489 Oribe	26 June 1995	list
7707 Yes	17 April 1993	list
7887 Bratfest	18 September 1993	list
7959 Alysecherri	2 August 1994	list
8109 Danielwilliam	25 February 1995	list
8711 Lukeasher	5 June 1994	list
(10571) 1994 LA_{1}	5 June 1994	list
12396 Amyphillips	24 February 1995	list
12789 Salvadoraguirre	14 October 1995	list
(13186) 1996 UM	18 October 1996	list
(16712) 1995 SW_{29}	30 September 1995	list

(24888) 1996 XS_{23}	8 December 1996	list
(26916) 1996 RR_{2}	13 September 1996	list
(32925) 1995 KF	24 May 1995	list
(35285) 1996 TR_{5}	6 October 1996	list
(37652) 1994 JS_{1}	4 May 1994	list^{[A]}
(37744) 1996 XU_{14}	8 December 1996	list
(39642) 1995 KO_{1}	26 May 1995	list
44192 Paulguttman	18 June 1998	list
55844 Bičák	12 September 1996	list
69406 Martz-Koh	30 September 1995	list
(85316) 1995 BA_{4}	28 January 1995	list^{[B]}
(85343) 1995 SX_{53}	30 September 1995	list
(118231) 1996 XQ_{18}	8 December 1996	list
121725 Aphidas	13 December 1999	list

(173176) 1997 KO	29 May 1997	list
(306387) 1994 GR_{8}	5 April 1994	list^{[B]}
(350455) 1997 SB_{5}	27 September 1997	list
(369982) 1998 BL_{10}	20 January 1998	list
(612141) 1999 XY_{143}	14 December 1999	list
(633769) 2009 XU_{6}	25 February 2006	list^{[C]}
(875153) 1995 BX_{3}	28 January 1995	list^{[B]}
Co-discovery made with:^{A} T. B. Spahr^{B} S. M. Larson^{C} A. C. Smith

== See also ==
- List of minor planet discoverers § C. W. Hergenrother
