= 2012 United Kingdom meteoroid =

2012 Earth-grazing meteor above the UK

The 2012 UK meteoroid was an object that entered the atmosphere above the United Kingdom on Friday, 21 September 2012, around 11pm. Many news agencies across the UK reported this event.

== Overview ==
Several theories were made as to the origin of the sightings - from it being a meteoroid to a UFO. Initially, the most prominent theory was that it was an old artificial satellite (i.e. a large piece of space junk) re-entering the atmosphere. However, later analysis showed that it was highly unlikely to be space junk; it travelled too fast, towards the slow end of the range of possible meteor speeds and, in addition, it traversed the sky from east to west while almost all satellites orbit from west to east or north and south.

According to Finnish mathematician Esko Lyytinen, the meteor was captured by Earth's gravity and entered the atmosphere once again above USA and Canada 155 minutes later. If confirmed, this would classify it as an Earth-grazing meteor.

== See also ==
- List of meteor air bursts
- Potentially hazardous object
- Near-Earth object
- Impact event
- Cyrillids
