= Earth-grazing meteoroid of 13 October 1990 =

Fireball meteoroid observed above Czechoslovakia and Poland

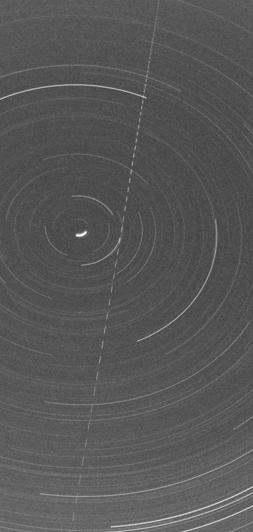
- Sky photo with the Earth-grazing meteoroid of 13 October 1990, as the faint near-vertical track just to the right of the pole star, taken at Červená hora, Czechoslovakia.
- Date: 13 October 1990; 35 years ago
- Time: 03:27:16±3 UT
- Duration: 9.8 seconds
- Location: Czechoslovakia, Poland; 49.050°N 17.650°E (begin) 52.683°N 17.067°E (end)
- Type: Ordinary chondrite
- First reporter: Petr Pravec, Pavel Klásek, Lucie Bulíčková
- Filmed by: European Fireball Network

On 13 October 1990, meteoroid EN131090, with an estimated mass of 44 kg, entered the Earth's atmosphere above Czechoslovakia and Poland and, after a few seconds, returned to space. Observations of such events are quite rare; this was the second recorded using scientific astronomical instruments (after the 1972 Great Daylight Fireball) and the first recorded from two distant positions, which enabled the calculation of several of its orbital characteristics. The encounter with Earth significantly changed its orbit and, to a smaller extent, some of its physical properties (mass and structure of its outer layer).

== Observations ==
Visual observations were reported by three independent Czech observers: astronomer Petr Pravec, Pavel Klásek, and Lucie Bulíčková. According to their report, the event started at 03:27:16±3 UT (Note: The record is in Universal Time (UT), local Central European Time (CET) was 1 hour later.) and the observed bright meteor (fireball) moved from south to north. It left a track that was visible for 10 seconds.

Most data about the encounter were acquired using photographic observations by cameras of the European Fireball Network. It was the first event of this type recorded by cameras from two distant locations, at Červená hora and Svratouch (both in the present-day Czech Republic), which enabled the calculation of the meteoroid's orbital characteristics by geometrical methods. Both were equipped with all-sky fisheye objectives.

The Červená hora image was especially valuable. It recorded the fireball's trajectory over approximately 110°, starting 51° above the southern horizon, passing the zenith just 1° westward and disappearing only 19° above the northern horizon (thus crossing about 60% of the sky). Its camera was also equipped with a rotating shutter that interrupted the exposure 12.5 times per second and divided the captured track of the fireball, allowing the determination of its speed. Over the last 4°, the fireball's angular velocity was lower than the resolution of the instrument. The Svratouch image recorded the trajectory only for about 15°, beginning at 30° above the northwest horizon, and the pictured fireball was quite weak. Despite this, the data were sufficient for the calculations.

Gotfred M. Kristensen also detected the fireball in Havdrup, Denmark, using a pen recorder connected to a radio receiver for 78 seconds, at 03:27:24±6 UT.

== Encounter data ==
Part of the track of the meteoroid above Czechoslovakia and Poland that was captured by European Fireball Network cameras

The meteoroid grazed Earth's atmosphere quite gently (in comparison to, for example, the 1972 Great Daylight Fireball above the United States and Canada). It became visible north of Uherský Brod, Czechoslovakia, at a height of 103.7 km, approaching the Earth's surface to 98.67 km (Note: That is just below the Kármán line, lying at the height of 100 km and considered to be the boundary of Earth's atmosphere.) northeast of Wrocław, Poland, and disappearing from sight at a height of 100.4 km north of Poznań, Poland. It would probably still have been visible until it reached a height of 110 km above the southern Baltic Sea.

The meteoroid's absolute magnitude (the apparent magnitude it would have at an altitude of 100 km at the observer's zenith) was approximately −6 and did not vary significantly during the few seconds of observation. It traveled a distance of 409 km in 9.8 seconds during the time it was observed. It moved at a speed of 41.74 km/s (150,260 km/h; 93,370 mph), (Note: This is the observed velocity. Geocentric velocity (i.e. velocity relative to the Earth, whose orbital velocity is about 30 km per second) was 40.22 km per second.) which did not change measurably during the flight. Jiří Borovička and Zdeněk Ceplecha from the Ondřejov Observatory in Czechoslovakia estimated that the deceleration caused by the friction of the atmosphere reached only 1.7 m/s^{2} at the fireball's perigee (closest approach to Earth), and its velocity was reduced by only 0.012 km per second (less than 0.03%). This corresponds well with computer simulations provided by D. W. Olson, R. L. Doescher and K. M. Watson at the Southwest Texas State University, who concluded that the deceleration was less than 0.5 m/s^{2} except for a few seconds near perigee. This small loss of speed, 12 m per second, corresponded to a loss of kinetic specific energy (in the Earth's frame of reference) of 0.5 MJ/kg, which was converted to heat (and perhaps sound). The change in the object's velocity vector due to Earth's gravity during the hours it was in the Earth's vicinity was on the order of kilometres per second.

The software also calculated the fireball's instantaneous apparent magnitude at the ground. The computation started and ended with heights of approximately 250 km, long before and after the cameras of the European Fireball Network could observe it. Its apparent magnitude started at a value of +5.7 and it became brighter quite quickly. The program gave an apparent magnitude of −5.7 when it was seen by one camera and −6.3 at perigee. The fireball subsequently dimmed, with an apparent magnitude of −5.4 when it was last seen by the cameras and a final calculated value of +6.0 at a height of 257 km. These values are not entirely certain, because the program worked with the simplified assumption that the luminous efficacy of the fireball did not change along the track. The starting apparent magnitude is not far from the naked eye visibility limits. For example, faint stars of the magnitude +6 can be observed only in dark rural areas approximately 150 km away from large cities. This magnitude corresponds to the apparent magnitude of Uranus. At its brightest, it was several times as bright as the maximum brightness of Venus.

Encounter data of the Earth-grazing meteoroid of 13 October 1990
Fireball parameters	begin	perigee	end
Velocity	41.74 km/s	41.74 km/s	41.74 km/s
Height	103.7 km	98.67 km	100.4 km
Coordinates	49.050°N 17.650°E	51.350°N 17.300°E	52.683°N 17.067°E
Absolute magnitude	−5.6	−6.2	−6.1
Apparent magnitude	−5.7	−6.3	−5.4

== Physical characteristics ==
The meteoroid was a type I fireball, i.e. an ordinary chondrite. When it entered Earth's atmosphere its mass was about 44 kg, which was estimated on the basis of the measured values of its absolute magnitude and velocity. From the known bulk densities of ordinary chondrites (3.40 ± 0.15 g/cm^{3} for H group ordinary chondrites, 3.40 ± 0.15 g/cm^{3} for L group and 3.29 ± 0.17 g/cm^{3} for LL group) we get the approximate diameter of the meteoroid between 28.5 and 30 cm. During the encounter it lost approximately 350 g of mass. Computer simulations showed that it started losing mass approximately at the moment it became visible to the cameras of the European Fireball Network, at a height of 100.6 km. Losing of mass lasted 35 seconds, until it reached a height of 215.7 km. Its surface melted and solidified again after leaving, which means its surface became a typical meteoritic fusion crust.

The meteoroid was not dangerous to life on Earth. Even if it had headed towards lower parts of the atmosphere it would have heated so much that it would have exploded high above the ground and only some small particles (meteorites) eventually might have made it to Earth's surface.

== Orbit ==
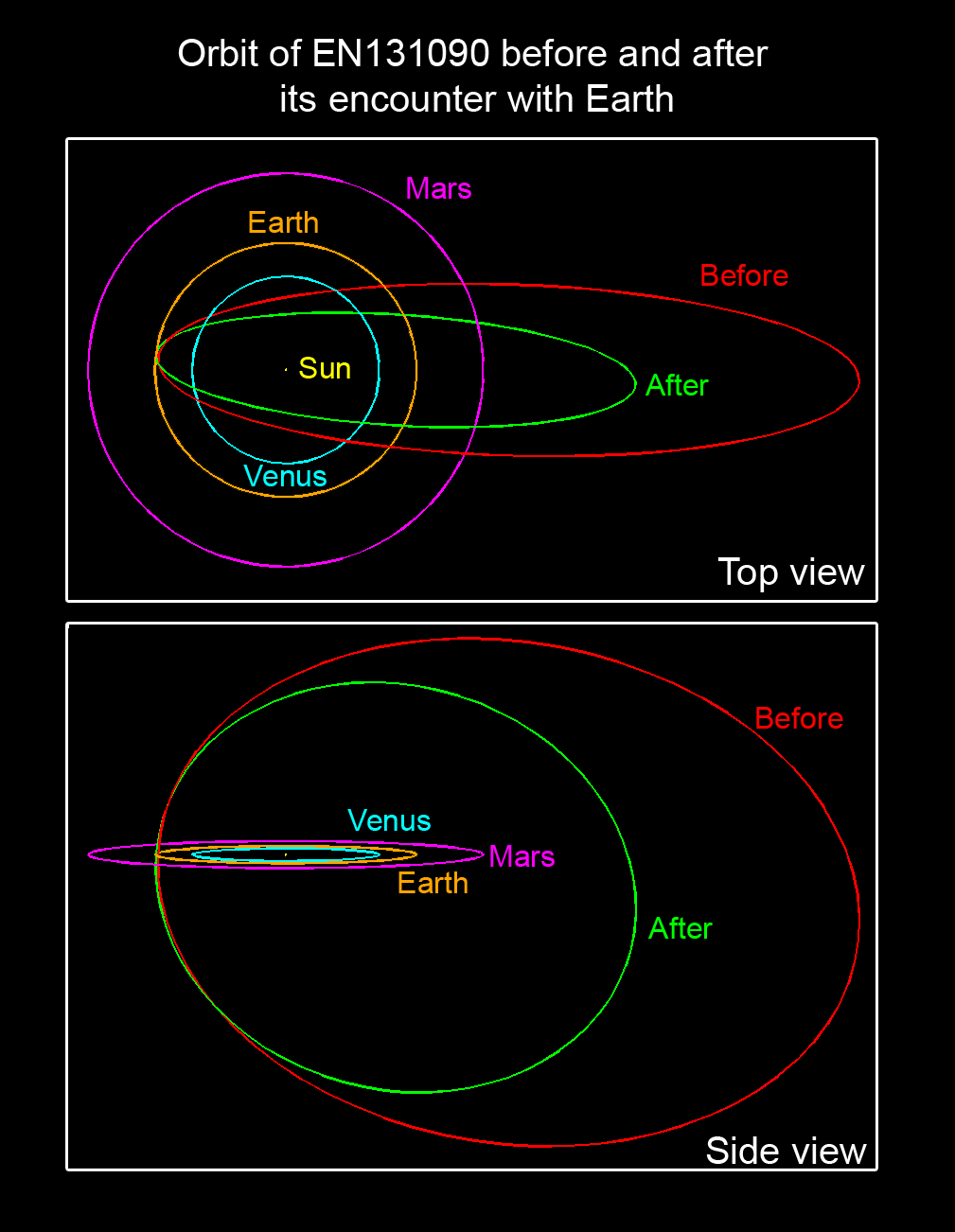
Orbit of the meteoroid before and after grazing Earth's atmosphere

Because the fireball was recorded by two cameras of the European Fireball Network, it was possible to calculate the trajectory of its flight through the atmosphere, and afterward also the characteristics of both its pre- and post-encounter orbit in the Solar System. The calculations were published by Czech astronomers Pavel Spurný, Zdeněk Ceplecha, and Jiří Borovička of the Ondřejov Observatory, who specialize in meteor observations. They demonstrated that the swing by the earth significantly altered the meteoroid's orbit. Its aphelion (the farthest it travels from the Sun) and orbital period were lowered to almost half of their original values. The object was initially in a highly inclined orbit (71°) and ended in an orbit with a slightly higher inclination (74°).

Orbital characteristics	Before encounter	After encounter
Semi-major axis	2.72 ± 0.08 AU	1.87 ± 0.03 AU
Orbital eccentricity	0.64 ± 0.01	0.473 ± 0.009
Perihelion	0.9923 ± 0.0001 AU	0.9844 ± 0.0002 AU
Aphelion	4.45 ± 0.15 AU	2.76 ± 0.07 AU
Argument of periapsis	9.6 ± 0.1°	16.6 ± 0.2°
Longitude of the ascending node	19.671°	19.671°
Orbital inclination	71.4 ± 0.2°	74.4 ± 0.2°
Orbital period	4.5 ± 0.2 years	2.56 ± 0.06 years

Approximately every 2.5 or 2.6 years, the object comes back to the point in the solar system where the 1990 encounter occurred, and the earth comes back to the same point every year. The period is not known precisely enough to predict when the next encounter between the two will occur.

== Similar events ==
Although entries of meteoroids into Earth's atmosphere are very common, recording a similar flight through the upper layers of the atmosphere is quite rare. Probably the first one reliably verified happened on 20 July 1860 above the American state of New York. The Czechoslovak–Polish fireball is sometimes compared to the 1972 Great Daylight Fireball above Utah, the United States, and Alberta, Canada, which is the first scientifically observed and studied event of this type. The 1972 fireball was more than a thousand times as massive and it got 40 km closer to Earth's surface. Observational data from both of them helped to develop a method for computing the grazing trajectories of such bodies, which was later used when calculating the trajectory of another Earth-grazing meteoroid, observed on 29 March 2006 above Japan.
