= Meteor procession =

Meteor that breaks apart into fragments travelling in the same direction

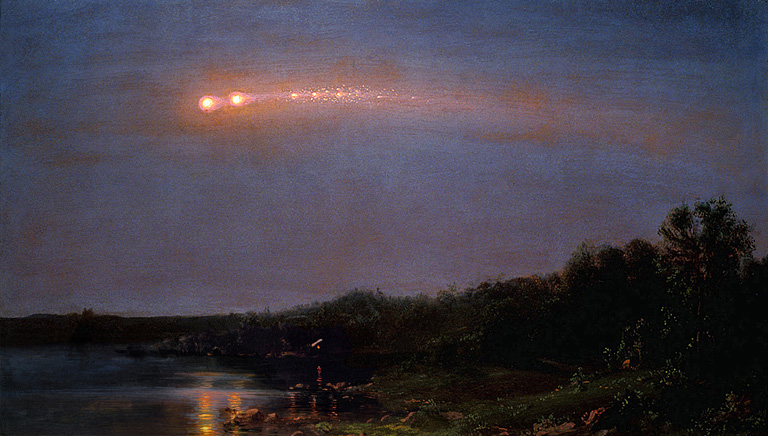
Oil painting by Frederic Edwin Church, The 1860 Great Meteor

A meteor procession occurs when an Earth-grazing meteor breaks apart, and the fragments travel across the sky in the same path. According to physicist Donald Olson, only four occurrences are known:

- 18 August 1783 Great Meteor (Passed over Blair Atholl, the east coast of southern Scotland and England and the English Channel, breaking up over southern France or northern Italy).
- 20 July 1860 Great Meteor; sighted over North America, believed by Olson to be the event referred to in Walt Whitman's poem Year of Meteors, 1859–60
- 21 December 1876 Great Meteor; sighted over Kansas, Missouri, Illinois, Indiana, Ohio, Pennsylvania
- 9 February 1913 Great Meteor Procession; a chain of slow, large meteors moving from northwest to southeast, sighted over North America, particularly in Canada, the North Atlantic and the Tropical South Atlantic

== See also ==
- 1972 Great Daylight Fireball – Atmospheric phenomenon
- Bolide – Extremely bright meteor
- Comet breakup – Natural object in space that releases gas
- Forensic astronomy – Study of past celestial appearances
- Green fireballs – Unidentified flying objects
- List of Earth-crossing asteroids
- Meteor shower – Celestial event caused by streams of meteoroids entering Earth's atmosphere
- Unidentified flying object – Apparent unusual observation in the sky
