= 1783 Great Meteor =

Bolide observed on 18 August 1783

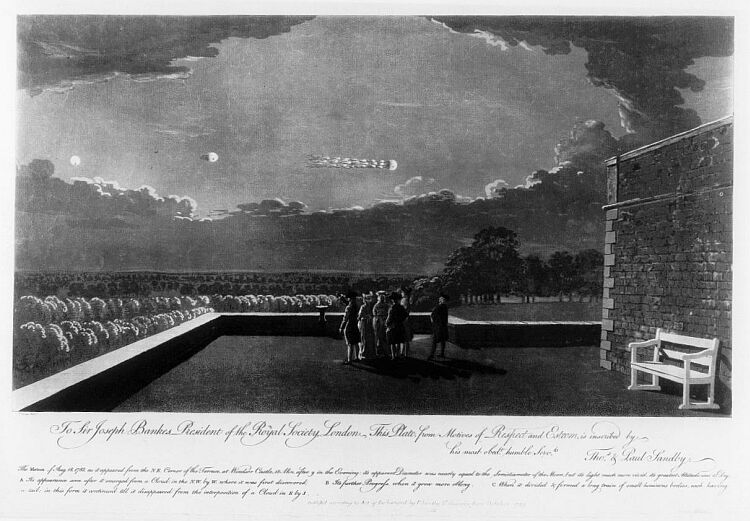
- Print of the 1783 Great Meteor by Paul Sandby (1731–1809). Original in the collection of the Hunterian Museum and Art Gallery
- Date: 18 August 1783
- Location: British Isles

The 1783 Great Meteor was a meteor procession observed on 18 August 1783 from the British Isles, at a time when such phenomena were not well understood. The meteor was the subject of much discussion in the Philosophical Transactions of the Royal Society and was the subject of a detailed study by Charles Blagden.

== Observations ==
The event occurred between 21:15 and 21:30 on 18 August 1783, on a clear, dry night. Analysis of observations has indicated that the meteor entered Earth's atmosphere over the North Sea, before passing over the east coast of Scotland and England and the English Channel; it finally broke up, after a passage within the atmosphere of around a thousand miles (roughly 1600 km), over south-eastern France or northern Italy.

There were many witnesses. Perhaps the most prominent was Tiberius Cavallo, an Italian natural philosopher who happened to be amongst a group of people on the terrace at Windsor Castle at the time the meteor appeared. Cavallo published his account of the phenomenon in v. 74 of the Philosophical Transactions :

Some flashes of lambent light, much like the aurora borealis, were first observed on the northern part of the heavens, which were soon perceived to proceed from a roundish luminous body, whose apparent diameter equaled half that of the moon, and almost stationary in the same point of the heavens [...] This ball at first appeared of a faint bluish light, perhaps from appearing just kindled, or from its appearing through the haziness; but it gradually increased its light, and soon began to move, at first ascending above the horizon in an oblique direction towards the east. Its course in this direction was very short, perhaps of five or six degrees; after which it directed its course towards the east [...] Its light was prodigious. Every object appeared very distinct; the whole face of the country, in that beautiful prospect before the terrace, being instantly illuminated.

Cavallo noted both that the meteor, which was visible for around thirty seconds in total, appeared to split into several smaller bodies (a meteor procession) immediately following the main mass and that a rumbling noise, "as it were of thunder at a great distance", was heard around ten minutes after the meteor appeared, which he speculated "was the report of the meteor's explosion". Other accounts, such as those of Alexander Aubert and Richard Lovell Edgeworth, noted red and blue colour tints in the fireball.

Some accounts appeared rather more fanciful; the London Magazine mentioned a letter by a lieutenant on a British warship which had been positioned north of Ireland "who relates he saw the same meteor moving along the north-east quarter [...] but he adds something singular enough, namely, that a little time afterwards, he saw it moving back again, the contrary way to which it came". The author added that "several other observations of this meteor have come into my hands, but they are so inconsistent with these already related, as well as with one another, that I forebear to mention them".

Gilbert White, writing in 1787, was to remember the "amazing and portentous" summer of 1783 as "full of horrible phaenomena [...] alarming meteors and tremendous thunder-storms that affrighted and distressed the different counties of this kingdom".

== Visual depictions ==
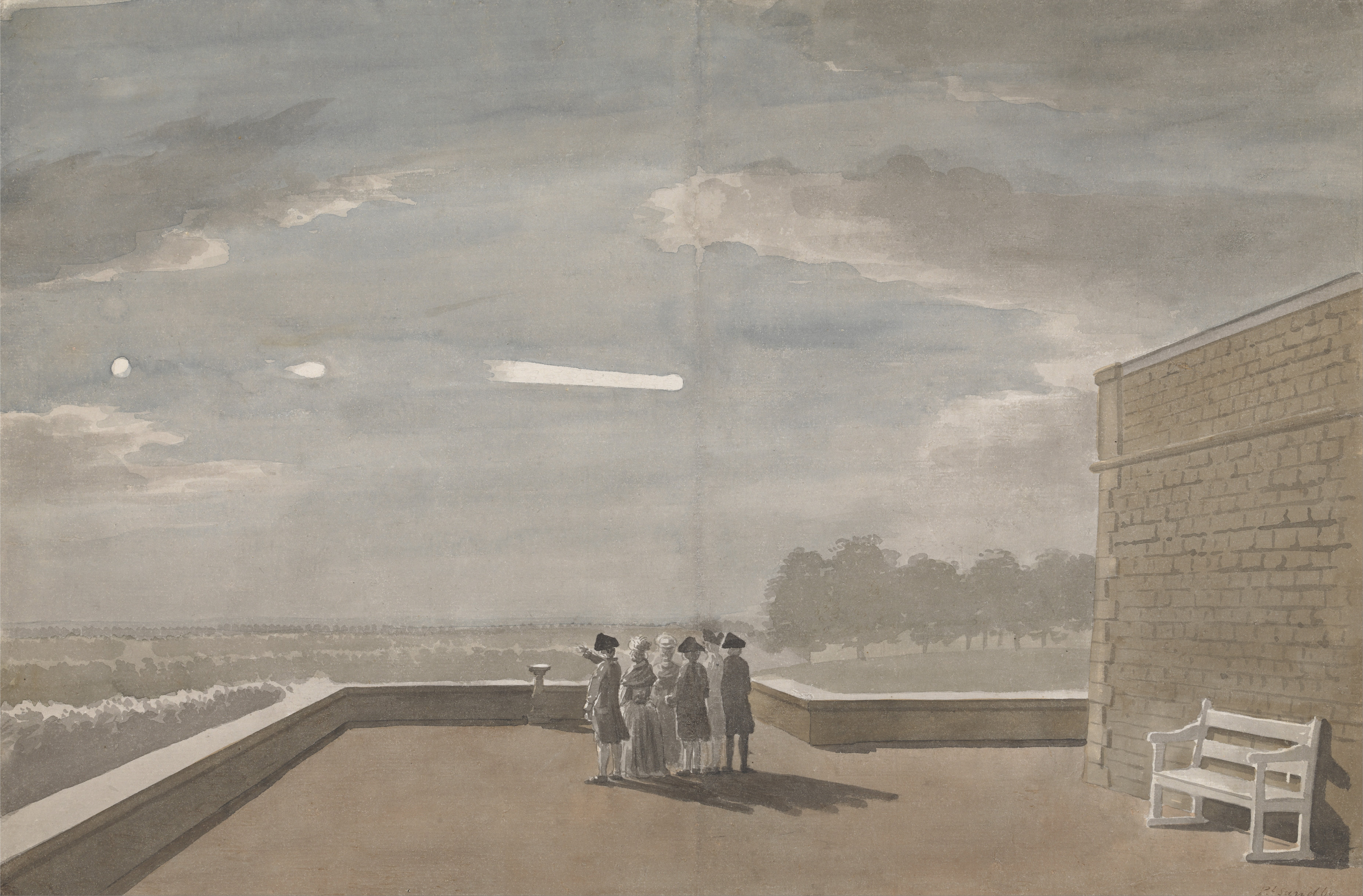
The 1783 Great Meteor, as seen from the East Angle of the North Terrace, Windsor Castle, Paul Sandby's original watercolour. Note the hazy environment of the image, associated with the Laki volcano eruption in that year.

Among Cavallo's five companions pictured were James Lind and John Lockman. One of the other companions on the terrace was the artist Thomas Sandby, who in collaboration with his brother Paul based a now well-known engraving on the event. A print of this engraving is held in the collection of the Hunterian Museum and Art Gallery at Glasgow University. A second engraving was produced by a schoolmaster, Henry Robinson, who observed the meteor from the village of Winthorpe, Nottinghamshire. Additional engravings, based on the drawings of the authors and presented in a fold-out form, were included with articles by Cavallo and Nathaniel Pigott in the Philosophical Transactions.

A painting traditionally thought to be of the 1759 apparition of Halley's Comet and attributed to the "English Canaletto", Samuel Scott, has in more recent years been interpreted as depicting a large fireball meteor given its generally uncometary appearance. Further work by Jay Pasachoff and Roberta Olson has suggested that the painting is not in fact by Scott, and that it depicts the third stage of the 1783 fireball, viewed over the Thames.

== Possible relation to meteorite falls ==
It has been speculated that the Hambleton Pallasite, a rare type of meteorite found in 2005 in Hambleton, North Yorkshire, may be related to the 1783 Great Meteor, based on the latter's track, and on weathering on the pallasite's surface.

== See also ==
- Earth-grazing fireball
- 1972 Great Daylight Fireball
