= Comet Pajdušáková =

Comet Pajdušáková or Pajdušáková's Comet, is the name of five comets discovered or co-discovered between 1946 and 1953 by the Czech astronomer, Ludmila Pajdusakova, below:

- 45P/Honda–Mrkos–Pajdušáková
- C/1946 K1 (Pajdušáková–Rotbart–Weber)
- C/1948 E1 (Pajdušáková–Mrkos)
- C/1951 C1 (Pajdušáková)
- C/1953 X1 (Pajdušáková)
