= C/1954 O1 (Vozarova) =

Hyperbolic comet

Discovery
- Discovered by: Margita V. Kresáková
- Discovery site: Skalnaté pleso Observatory
- Discovery date: 28 July 1954

Designations
- Alternative designations: 1954f 1954 VIII

Orbital characteristics
- Epoch: 9 November 1954 (JD 2435055.5)
- Observation arc: 144 days
- Number of observations: 60
- Perihelion: 0.7812 AU
- Semi-major axis: –10.6066 AU
- Eccentricity: 1.07365
- Inclination: 115.184°
- Longitude of ascending node: 123.986°
- Argument of periapsis: 5.108°
- Last perihelion: 1 June 1954
- Earth MOID: 0.2005 AU
- Jupiter MOID: 3.5469 AU

Physical characteristics
- Mean radius: 0.893 km (0.555 mi) (Note: Calculated mean radius using the formula: $\log_{10}\,(\,R\,)\ =\;0.9 +\;0.13 (\,H\,)$ Where $\,H\,$ is the comet's absolute total magnitude (M1))
- Comet total magnitude (M1): 7.3
- Apparent magnitude: 9.0 (1954 apparition)

Comet Vozarova, formally designated C/1954 O1, is a possibly hyperbolic comet discovered by Slovak astronomer, Margita Vozárová, on 28 July 1954. The orbit calculation is based on 4 observations according to JPL, and the orbit may not be hyperbolic as according to the uncertainty the eccentricity could be between 0.6 and 1.5.

== Discovery and observation ==
The comet was already on its outbound flight as a magnitude 9.0 object upon discovery, where some observers noticed it also may have potentially fragmented.

By August, the comet was found to have a 20-arcminute long tail pointed towards the Sun. It was last observed from the Lick Observatory as a magnitude 18.5 object on 18 December 1954.
