= Donald Olson (astronomer) =

American astrophysicist and forensic astronomer

Donald W. Olson
- Occupations: Astrophysicist, forensic astronomer

Academic background
- Education: B.S. in physics, Michigan State University; PhD in physics, University of California-Berkeley

Donald W. Olson is an astrophysicist and forensic astronomer at the Texas State University. Nicknamed the "Celestial Sleuth," he is known for studying art and history using astronomical data. He is currently regents professor emeritus at Texas State's Department of Physics.

== Education ==
Olson received a B.S. in physics from Michigan State University. Upon graduating, he was awarded the Thomas H. Osgood Undergraduate Physics Award. He later studied at University of California-Berkeley, where he received his PhD. Olson went on to study at Cornell University and University of Texas at Austin, before taking up a teaching position at Texas State University in 1981.

== Career ==
Olson began his career studying the theory of relativity and creating computer simulations of astronomical phenomena such as the distribution of galaxies or radiation near black holes. He became well known for his work in the field of forensic astronomy, often in collaboration with fellow astrophysicist Russell Doescher. Their work has also studied how astronomy has impacted events such as battles and historical decisions.

In 2004, he and Doescher suggested that the traditionally accepted date for the Battle of Marathon was incorrect, taking place on August 12, rather than the traditionally accepted date of September 12. In 2008, he and Doescher published a paper claiming to have found the precise date and location of Julius Caesar's landing in Britain. Olson's team also attempted to recreate the timeline of Mary Shelley's inspiration to write Frankenstein, which the author claimed occurred during a moonlit night but which historians had traditionally dismissed. Based on the team's findings, Shelley likely did experience a moonlit night on June 16, 1816, the date on which she conceived of Frankenstein.

Olson received the Presidential Award for Excellence in Teaching in 2011. In 2012, Olson led a team of researchers who studied whether the sinking of the Titanic may have been caused by a lunar event. At the time of the sinking on April 15, 1912, the moon was simultaneously at perigee and in line with the Sun, producing a rare spring tide that may have pushed ice bergs into the path of the ship. This was the closest approach to Earth made by the moon in 1,440 years.

Olson was awarded the 2014 Klopsteg Memorial Lecture Award by the American Association of Physics Teachers.

He has authored papers on historically significant astronomical events such as the 1913 Great Meteor Procession. He has also studied the astronomical conditions which inspired unusual paintings and photographs by artists such as Johannes Vermeer, Edvard Munch, Claude Monet, and Ansel Adams, as well as exactly when they would have been created. Other research has studied descriptions of astronomical phenomena in literary works like The Canterbury Tales or Childe Harold's Pilgrimage.

He wrote the book Celestial Sleuth, which was published by Springer in 2014. The book explores the historical significance of astronomical phenomena in world history, as well as analyzing historical descriptions of astronomical events.

He has criticized some archaeoastronomical theories, such as the idea that the Norse myth of Ragnarök was inspired by the Hyades star cluster.

In 2022, he published Investigating Art, History, and Literature with Astronomy as part of the Springer Praxis series.

== Bibliography ==
- 2022. Investigating Art, History, and Literature with Astronomy. Springer.
- 2014. Celestial Sleuth. Springer.
