= Earth-grazing fireball =

Meteoroid that enters Earth's atmosphere and leaves again

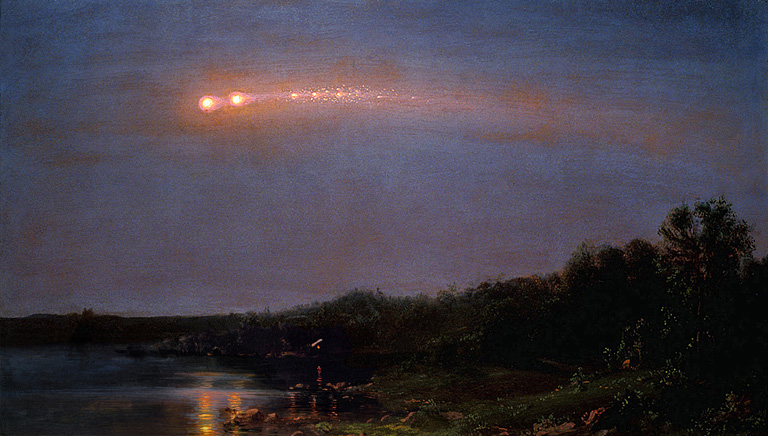
Frederic Edwin Church, The Meteor of 1860. In 2010, it was determined to be an Earth-grazing meteor procession.

An Earth-grazing fireball (or Earth grazer) is a fireball, a very bright meteor that enters Earth’s atmosphere and leaves again. Some fragments may impact Earth as meteorites, if the meteor starts to break up or explodes in mid-air. These phenomena are then called Earth-grazing meteor processions and bolides. Famous examples of Earth-grazers are the 1972 Great Daylight Fireball and the 1860 Great Meteor procession.

== Overview ==
As an Earth-grazer passes through the atmosphere its mass and velocity are changed, so that its orbit, after it re-enters space, will be different from its orbit before it encountered Earth's atmosphere.

There is no agreed-upon end to the upper atmosphere, but rather incrementally thinner air from the stratosphere (11~50 km (7~31 mi)), mesosphere (~85 km or 53 mi), and thermosphere (~690 km or 430 mi) up to the exosphere (~10,000 km or 6,200 mi) (see also thermopause). For example, a meteoroid can become a meteor at an altitude of 85–120 km (53–75 mi) above the Earth.

== Known Earth-grazing fireballs ==
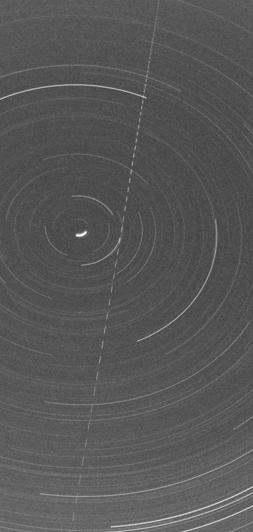
Sky photo with the Earth-grazing meteoroid of 13 October 1990, as the light track across the picture going from the south to the north, taken at Červená hora (Czech Republic), one of the stations of the European Fireball Network.

An Earth-grazing fireball is a rarely measured kind of fireball caused by a meteoroid that collides with the Earth's atmosphere but survives the collision by passing through, and exiting, the atmosphere. As of 2026, seven grazers have been scientifically observed.

- Meteor procession of July 20, 1860
- Meteor procession of February 9, 1913 led to conclusions a temporary satellite capture of Earth had broken up
- 1972 Great Daylight Fireball, August 10, 1972, US19720810 at 15 km/s above United States and Canada (first scientific observation). It was estimated to have lost about half its mass, and 800 m/s of velocity during the encounter.
- October 13, 1990, a 40 kilogram, 41.5 km/s meteoroid passed at 97.9 km above Czechoslovakia (first orbit calculation based on photographic records from two distant places).
- March 29, 2006, an 18.8 km/s fireball passed through the atmosphere 71.4 km above Japan
- August 7, 2007, EN070807 passed through the atmosphere over Europe with an orbit belonging to the rare Aten asteroid type
- June 10, 2012, an Earth-grazing fireball from the Daytime ζ-Perseid shower passed over Spain, travelling 510 km in the atmosphere. It was the faintest Earth-grazing meteor reported in the scientific literature and the first one belonging to a meteor shower.
- December 24, 2014, a slow moving Christmas Eve fireball SPMN241214 passed over north Africa, Spain, and Portugal, travelling about 1,200 km in the atmosphere.
- July 7, 2017, the Desert Fireball Network observed a grazing fireball that traveled over 1300 km through the atmosphere above Western Australia and South Australia. The closest approach was about 58.5 km, and the initial mass is estimated to be a minimum of ~60 kg. The meteoroid came from an Apollo-type orbit, and due to the close encounter with the Earth, it was sent onto a Jupiter-family comet-like orbit.

== See also ==
- List of asteroid close approaches to Earth
- List of Earth-crossing asteroids
- Meteoroid – Sand- to boulder-sized particle of debris in the Solar System
- Cyrillids – Meteor shower across the Western Hemisphere
- Asteroid impact prediction – Prediction of the dates and times of asteroids impacting Earth
