= 1860 Great Meteor =

Meteor procession seen across the United States

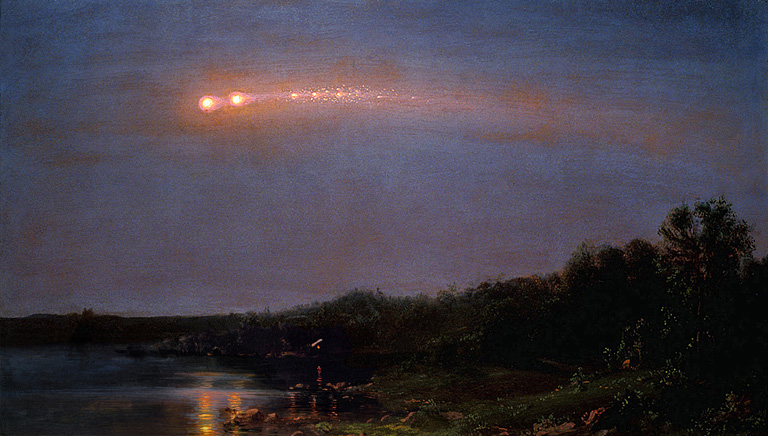
- Frederic Edwin Church (American, 1826–1900) 'The Meteor,' 1860-61, oil on paper laid to canvas, 10 3/8 x 17 7/8 in. (26.6 x 43.2cm), Wadsworth Atheneum Museum of Art, The Dorothy Clark Archibald and Thomas L. Archibald Fund & The Ella Gallup Sumner and Mary Catlin Sumner Collection Fund, 2025.3.1
- Date: July 20, 1860
- Location: United States

The 1860 Great Meteor procession occurred on July 20, 1860. It was an extremely rare meteoric phenomenon reported from locations across the United States.

American landscape painter Frederic Church saw and painted a spectacular string of fireball meteors across the Catskill evening sky, an extremely rare Earth-grazing meteor procession. The painting now belongs to the Wadsworth Atheneum Museum of Art in Hartford, Connecticut, Frederic Church's birthplace.

It is believed that this was the event referred to in the poem Year of Meteors, 1859-60, by Walt Whitman. Both Whitman and Herman Melville analogized the 1860 procession to John Brown's raid on Harpers Ferry and described it as a portent of coming war. Henry David Thoreau also compared John Brown's journey south to the transit of a meteor.

== See also ==
- 1783 Great Meteor
- 1913 Great Meteor Procession
- 1972 Great Daylight Fireball
