= Karlstein =

Karlstein may refer to places in:

Germany

- Karlstein am Main, a municipality in Landkreis Aschaffenburg, Bavaria
- part of Bad Reichenhall, Bavaria
  - a rock with a ruin there
- Karlstein bei Hornberg, a rock in Hornberg, Baden-Württemberg
- part of Regenstauf, Landkreis Regensburg, Bavaria
  - Schloss Karlstein, the castle there
- Aussichtspunkt Karlstein, a site above Weinstadt, Baden-Württemberg

Austria

- Karlstein an der Thaya, a municipality in Lower Austria, Austria
  - Schloss Karlstein, the castle there
  - Internierungslager Karlstein an der Thaya, a former internment camp there

Czech Republic

- Karlštejn Castle, a 14th-century castle in Central Bohemia
  - Karlštejn (Beroun District), městys named after the castle
  - Karlštejn, nature reserve nearby the castle
- Hunting castle Karlštejn nearby village Svratouch in Pardubice Region (Chrudim District)
  - Karlštejn, administrative part of village Svratouch, named after the hunting castle
  - Karlštejn, hill in Žďárské vrchy where the hunting castle is situated
