= 1807 Slovakia =

Slow-rotating main-belt asteroid

Discovery
- Discovered by: M. Antal
- Discovery site: Skalnaté Pleso Obs.
- Discovery date: 20 August 1971

Designations
- Named after: Slovakia (country)
- Alternative designations: 1971 QA · 1928 UE; 1948 UC · 1951 JA; 1951 QK · 1954 NA; 1960 GB · 1971 TM_{1}
- Minor planet category: main-belt · (inner)

Orbital characteristics
- Epoch 4 September 2017 (JD 2458000.5)
- Uncertainty parameter 0
- Observation arc: 87.74 yr (32,046 days)
- Aphelion: 2.6229 AU
- Perihelion: 1.8289 AU
- Semi-major axis: 2.2259 AU
- Eccentricity: 0.1784
- Orbital period (sidereal): 3.32 yr (1,213 days)
- Mean anomaly: 283.80°
- Mean motion: 0° 17^{m} 48.48^{s} / day
- Inclination: 3.4919°
- Longitude of ascending node: 236.35°
- Argument of perihelion: 140.53°

Physical characteristics
- Dimensions: 9.135±0.092 km 9.146±0.059 km 9.40 km (calculated)
- Synodic rotation period: 24 h (dated); 308.0±0.3 h 308.6 h
- Geometric albedo: 0.20 (assumed); 0.3058±0.0411; 0.309±0.073
- Spectral type: SMASS = S · S
- Absolute magnitude (H): 12.1 · 12.5 · 12.61 · 13.06±0.93

1807 Slovakia, provisional designation 1971 QA, is a stony asteroid and slow rotator from the inner regions of the asteroid belt, approximately 9 kilometers in diameter. It was discovered on 20 August 1971, by Slovak astronomer Milan Antal at Skalnaté pleso Observatory in the High Tatras mountains of Slovakia and named after the Slovak Republic.

== Orbit and classification ==
The asteroid orbits the Sun in the inner main-belt at a distance of 1.8–2.6 AU once every 3 years and 4 months (1,213 days). Its orbit has an eccentricity of 0.18 and an inclination of 3° with respect to the ecliptic.

It was first identified as 1928 UE at Heidelberg Observatory in 1928, extending the body's observation arc by 43 years prior to its official discovery observation at Skalnaté pleso.

== Physical characteristics ==
In the SMASS classification, Slovakia is a common stony S-type asteroid.

=== Slow rotator ===
Slovakia has an exceptionally long rotation period of 308 hours with a high brightness variation of 1.10 magnitude (U=3-). The Collaborative Asteroid Lightcurve Link (CALL) adopts a period of 308.6 hours with an amplitude of 1.1 magnitude.

=== Diameter and albedo ===
According to the survey carried out by NASA's Wide-field Infrared Survey Explorer with its subsequent NEOWISE mission, Slovakia measures 9.14 kilometers in diameter, and its surface has an albedo of 0.31, while CALL assumes a standard albedo for stony asteroids of 0.20 and calculates a diameter of 9.40 kilometers with an absolute magnitude of 12.5

== Naming ==
This minor planet was named in honor of the now independent state of Slovakia (Slovak Republic), the country where the discovering observatory is located. At the time Slovakia was still part of the socialistic republic of Czechoslovakia that was formed after World War I and lasted until the end of the Cold War (also see 2315 Czechoslovakia). The official naming citation was published by the Minor Planet Center on 15 June 1973 (M.P.C. 3508).
