= C/1951 C1 (Pajdušáková) =

Parabolic comet

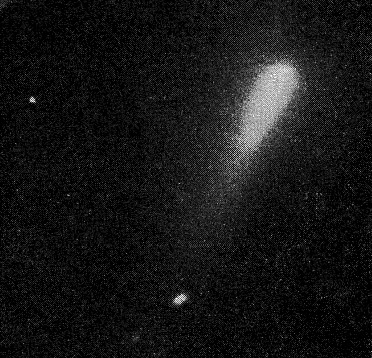
- The comet imaged by George van Biesbroeck from the Yerkes Observatory on 10 February 1951.

Discovery
- Discovered by: Ľudmila Pajdušáková
- Discovery site: Skalnaté pleso Observatory
- Discovery date: 4 February 1951

Designations
- Alternative designations: 1951 II, 1951a

Orbital characteristics
- Epoch: 17 March 1951 (JD 2433722.5)
- Observation arc: 91 days
- Number of observations: 17
- Perihelion: 0.719 AU
- Eccentricity: ~1.000
- Inclination: 87.897°
- Longitude of ascending node: 311.22°
- Argument of periapsis: 68.602°
- Earth MOID: 0.033 AU
- Jupiter MOID: 2.010 AU

Physical characteristics
- Mean radius: 0.476 km (0.296 mi) (Note: Calculated mean radius using the formula: $\log_{10}\,(\,R\,)\ =\;0.9 +\;0.13 (\,H\,)$ Where $\,H\,$ is the comet's absolute total magnitude (M1))
- Comet total magnitude (M1): 9.4
- Apparent magnitude: 8.0 (1951 apparition)

Comet Pajdušáková, formally designated as C/1951 C1, is a faint non-periodic comet that appeared between February and May 1951. It was the fourth comet discovered overall by the Slovak astronomer Ľudmila Pajdušáková, and the first one she had discovered independently.

== Physical characteristics ==
Spectroscopic observations at the McDonald Observatory took place when the comet was around 0.92–0.93 AU (138–139 million km) from the Sun. The data revealed that the surrounding coma had strong gas emissions of cyanogen (CN) compounds, with traces of amine (NH_{2}) but no presence of diatomic carbon (C_{2}) molecules. Based on these findings, researchers concluded that this was a dynamically new comet from the Oort cloud, on its first journey to the inner Solar System.
