= Regina Podstanická =

Slovak astronomer (1928–2000)

- Born: Regina Šáškyová; 25 March 1928; Látky, Czechoslovakia
- Died: 25 November 2000 (aged 72); Žilina, Slovakia
- Occupation: Professor of Physics

Academic background
- Education: Comenius University

Academic work
- Discipline: Physics
- Institutions: Slovak Academy of Sciences; University of Žilina

Regina Podstanická (née Šáškyová; 25 March 1928 – 20 November 2000) was a Slovak astronomer. She co-discovered 1989 Tatry, the first minor planet discovered from Slovakia.

== Life ==
Podstanická was born as Regina Šáškyová on 20 March 1928 in the village of Látky in central Slovakia. She was educated at the grammar school in Banská Bystrica and studied physics at the Comenius University, graduating in 1952. Following her graduation she worked at the Slovak Academy of Sciences, focusing on study of perseids at the Skalné Pleso Skalnaté pleso Observatory. On 20 March 1955 Podstanická and her fellow Slovak Academy of Sciences astronomer Alois Paroubek discovered the 1989 Tatry minor planet, becoming the first minor planet discoverers from Slovakia.

Between 1957 and 1961 she worked as a physics teacher at a grammar school in Zvolen.

From 1961 until her retirement in 1988 she lectured at the University of Žilina. Until her sudden death on 20 November 2000, she remained an active member of the Slovak Astronomical Society.
