= 1989 Tatry =

Tumbling carbonaceous asteroid

Discovery
- Discovered by: A. Paroubek; R. Podstanicka
- Discovery site: Skalnaté Pleso Obs.
- Discovery date: 20 March 1955

Designations
- Named after: High Tatra Mountains (in northern Slovakia)
- Alternative designations: 1955 FG · 1935 UQ; 1944 DL · 1955 DY; 1964 WK · 1968 YC; 1971 SJ_{2}
- Minor planet category: main-belt · Vestian

Orbital characteristics
- Epoch 4 September 2017 (JD 2458000.5)
- Uncertainty parameter 0
- Observation arc: 81.63 yr (29,815 days)
- Aphelion: 2.5314 AU
- Perihelion: 2.1704 AU
- Semi-major axis: 2.3509 AU
- Eccentricity: 0.0768
- Orbital period (sidereal): 3.60 yr (1,317 days)
- Mean anomaly: 166.59°
- Mean motion: 0° 16^{m} 24.24^{s} / day
- Inclination: 7.7654°
- Longitude of ascending node: 25.305°
- Argument of perihelion: 88.343°

Physical characteristics
- Dimensions: 8.99±2.38 km 9.399±0.122 km 9.603±0.063 km 9.87±0.88 km 16.81 km (calculated)
- Synodic rotation period: 24 h 39.9±0.1 h 131.3±0.2 h
- Geometric albedo: 0.057 (assumed); 0.175±0.017; 0.1917±0.0338; 0.240±0.205; 0.262±0.048
- Spectral type: SMASS = C
- Absolute magnitude (H): 12.10 · 12.10±0.91 · 12.40 · 12.5 · 12.6

1989 Tatry, provisional designation 1955 FG, is a carbonaceous Vestian asteroid and tumbling slow rotator from the inner regions of the asteroid belt, approximately 16 kilometers in diameter.

It was discovered on 20 March 1955, by the Slovak astronomers Alois Paroubek and Regina Podstanická at Skalnate Pleso Observatory, Slovakia, and named for the High Tatra Mountains. It was their only minor planet discovery.

== Orbit and classification ==
Based on its orbital elements, the asteroid Tatry is a member of the Vesta family and classified as a carbonaceous C-type asteroid in the SMASS taxonomy. It orbits the Sun in the inner main-belt at a distance of 2.2–2.5 AU once every 3 years and 7 months (1,317 days). Its orbit has an eccentricity of 0.08 and an inclination of 8° with respect to the ecliptic. It was first identified as 1935 UQ at the South African Union Observatory in 1935, extending the asteroid's observation arc by 20 years prior to its official discovery.

== Diameter and albedo ==
According to the surveys carried out by the Japanese Akari satellite, and NASA's Wide-field Infrared Survey Explorer with its subsequent NEOWISE mission, the asteroid measures between 8.99 and 9.87 kilometers in diameter and its surface has an albedo between 0.175 and 0.262. The Collaborative Asteroid Lightcurve Link assumes a standard albedo for carbonaceous asteroids of 0.057 and calculates a much larger diameter of 16.8 kilometers, as the lower the albedo (reflectivity), the higher the diameter at a constant absolute magnitude (brightness).

== Lightcurves ==
Photometric measurements of the asteroid made in January 2005, by astronomer Brian D. Warner at his Palmer Divide Observatory, Colorado, gave a lightcurve with a period of 39.9±0.1 hours and a brightness variation of below 0.22±0.02 in magnitude. However, the data was incomplete, so the period is considered suspect (U=2-). Further measurements made in October 2007, by Adrián Galád, Leonard Kornoš and Štefan Gajdoš at Modra Observatory in Slovakia, showed a much longer period of 131.3±0.2 hours with a brightness variation of 0.5 in magnitude (U=2). In March 2009, a fragmentary lightcurve obtained by French amateur astronomer Pierre Antonini gave a period of 24 hours (U=1).

=== Tumbler ===
The observers also detected a non-principal axis rotation seen in distinct rotational cycles in successive order. This is commonly known as tumbling. Tatry is one of a group of less than 200 bodies known to be is such a state (also see List of tumblers).

== Naming ==
This minor planet is named after the location of the discovering observatory, High Tatras (Slovak: Vysoké Tatry), the highest mountain range in northern Slovakia. The approved naming citation was published by the Minor Planet Center on 1 February 1980 (M.P.C. 5183).
