= FREYA (camera) =

Czech scientific hyperspectral camera

- Operator: (Czech Republic) Czech Academy of Sciences
- Instrument type: Hyperspectral camera
- Function: Meteor observation

Host spacecraft
- Launch date: 2028 (planned)

FREYA is a scientific hyperspectral camera under development by the Czech Academy of Sciences. It is intended for use on small satellites in low Earth orbit for observation and ultraviolet spectroscopic analysis of meteors in Earth atmosphere, as well as reentry events of spacecraft and space debris. A prototype of the instrument was successfully tested in 2024 on a series of high-altitude balloon flights (Morana 1 to 3) over Slovakia during which it managed to capture the first ever stratospheric UV spectrum of a meteor. The data were later used to identify the meteor as part of the Geminid meteor shower and to triangulate its trajectory. FREYA is expected to be tested in low Earth orbit no earlier than 2028 aboard the Czech CubeSat mission SATen, and possibly also on the ESA's Space Rider spacecraft.

== See also ==
- List of Czech satellites
- European Fireball Network – International astronomy organization based in Central Europe
