= Gustav Hahn =

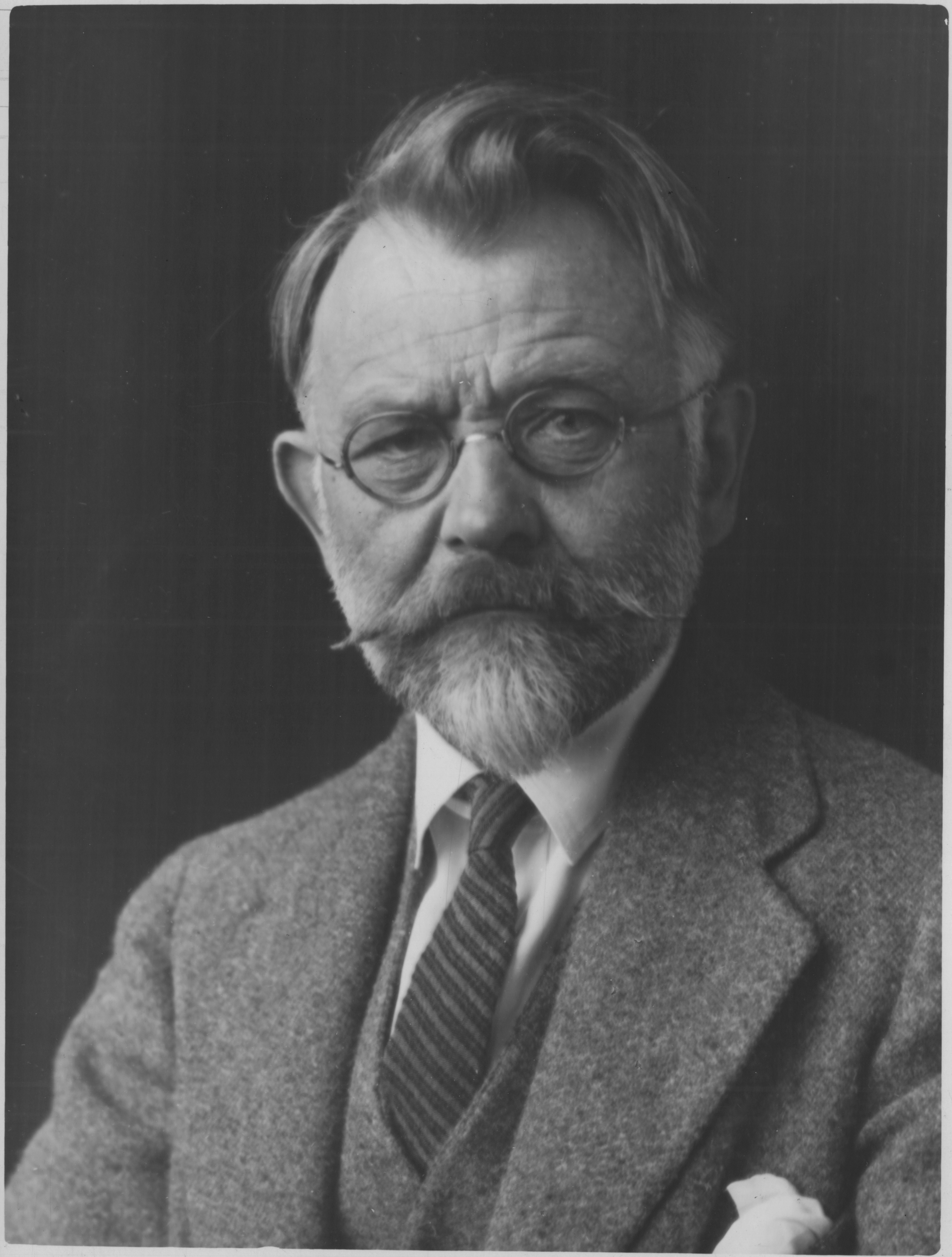
- Born: 27 July 1866; Reutlingen, Germany
- Died: 1 December 1962 (aged 96)
- Notable work: 1913 Great Meteor Procession; Hail Dominion
- Movement: Art Nouveau

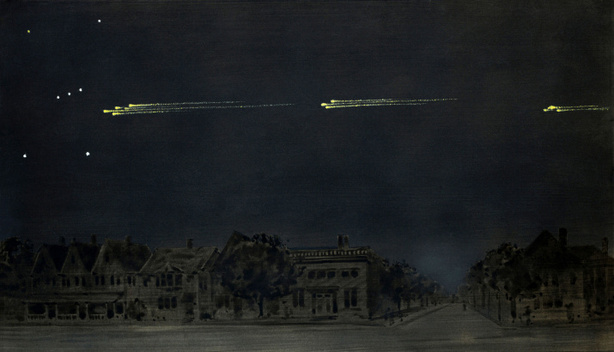
1913 Great Meteor Procession by Hahn

Gustav Hahn RCA (27 July 1866 – 1 December 1962) was a German Canadian painter, muralist and interior decorator who pioneered the Art Nouveau style in Canada. Hahn was also an amateur astronomer, and his father, Otto Hahn, owned a collection of meteorites.

== Life ==
Hahn was born in Reutlingen, then in the German Confederation. As a young man, he attended art school in Stuttgart. In 1888 he moved to Toronto in Canada, where he started to work as a designer in an interior decorating firm. Hahn painted murals in public buildings such as the Ontario Legislature and the Toronto Old City Hall, as well as churches and residences.

Hahn's major works include the depiction of the 1913 Great Meteor Procession (titled Meteoric Display of February 9, 1913, as seen near High Park) and Hail Dominion (1906). Hail Dominion was a part of a proposal to make a series of murals for the Parliament buildings in Ottawa with the Toronto painter George A. Reid. For Hail Dominion Hahn used his wife and elder daughters as models for Mother Canada.

Hahn taught at the Ontario College of Art, the Royal Ontario Museum, and Central Technical School. His daughter, Sylvia Hahn, also became a muralist.

His brother was Emanuel Hahn.

== See also ==
- List of German Canadians
