= Forensic astronomy =

Study of past celestial appearances

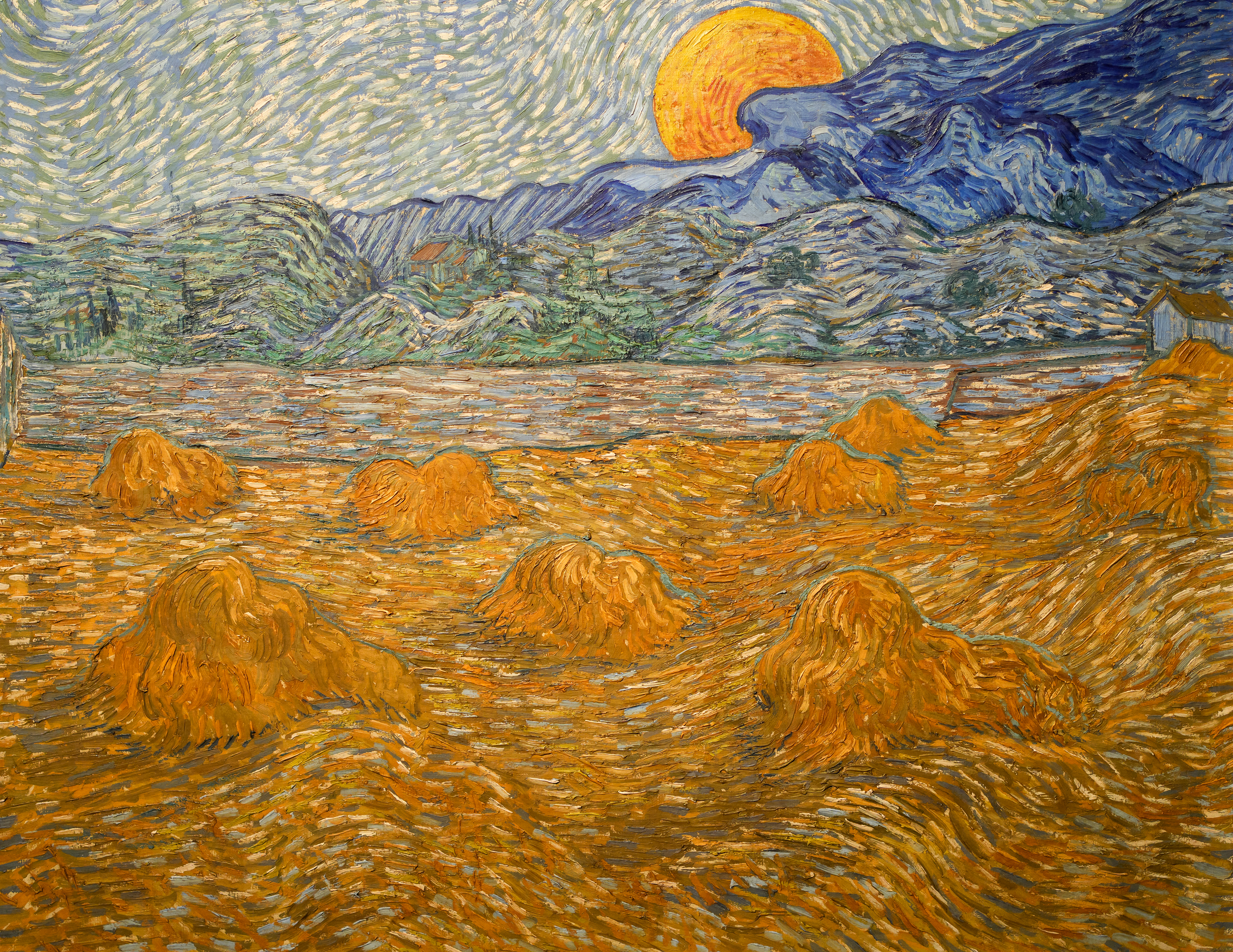
Forensic astronomy helped date Vincent van Gogh's painting Evening Landscape with Rising Moon.

Forensic astronomy is the use of astronomy to determine the appearance or effect of sky conditions and celestial object positions in historical events. This has been used, if relatively rarely, in forensic science, and in art history.

== Forensic science ==
As a forensic science in the strict sense of the term, astronomical knowledge can help resolve certain legal questions. In one reported instance, an astronomer testified in court as an expert witness as to whether a newly built house would cast a shadow on another house. More generally, questions about the Sun's or Moon's placement in the sky at certain times of day or night may be legally relevant, such as for determining the date on which a photograph was taken. Abraham Lincoln once successfully defended a legal case by describing the location of the Moon on the night of the offense.

== History ==
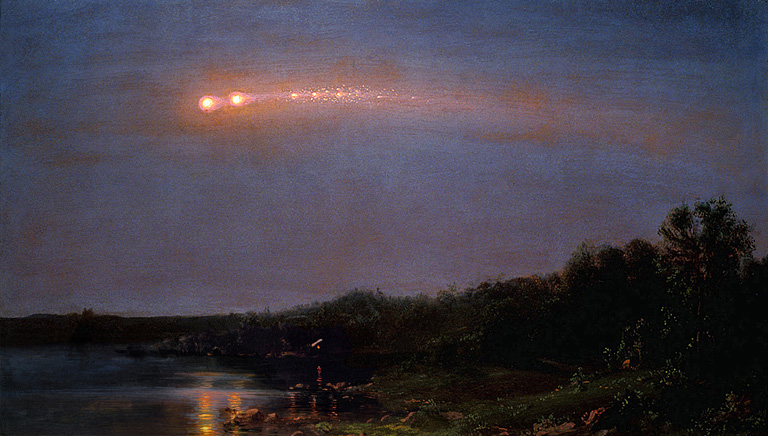
Frederic Edwin Church, The Meteor of 1860

By extension, the adjective "forensic" has come to be used for any detailed analysis of past events, whether related to legal questions or not, and so the determination of past celestial constellations more generally is now increasingly referred to as "forensic astronomy".

For research in art history, in particular, methods of astronomy are sometimes useful for determining the place and time of creation of a particular work of art, or of the event that inspired it. Such methods have for instance been used to date Vincent van Gogh's painting Evening Landscape with Rising Moon (to 9:08 pm, 13 July 1889), and to identify the meteors described in Walt Whitman's poem Year of Meteors (1859-60) – in conjunction with Frederic Edwin Church's painting of the same event (at right) – as the meteor procession of 1860.

== Forensic astronomy in literature ==
=== The Rubaiyat of Omar Khayyam and the “False Dawn” ===
The False Dawn, which is also known as the “zodiacal light”, demonstrates a faint glow that can be seen in the sky to the east in certain conditions and right before the morning light fall. It gets its name because many believe it to be the fall of dawn, but it is not. The zodiacal light is the sunlight shining into the dust that is between planets that orbit around the Sun. The name comes from the light coming mostly from the constellations that lie in the zodiac along the Sun's orbit. The zodiacal light was believed to earliest be discussed in 1905 by William T. Lynn where he says that Omar Khayyam's poem The Rubaiyat references the “False Dawn”, but his references are not correct about the “False Dawn”. Later researchers found that Omar Khayyam was mistaken and not seeing the “False Dawn”, but was seeing a “faint morning twilight glow” that was commonly mistaken for the “False Dawn” it was only the “morning sky”.

== Forensic astronomy in history ==
=== The sinking of the Titanic ===
On April 10, 1912, a ship sailed from Southampton, England called the RMS Titanic. The Titanic stopped in France and Ireland, and then to sailed for New York City but never made it. On April 14, at 11:40 pm, the ship struck an iceberg, and by April 15 the Titanic had sunk completely by 2:20 am. Many were saved, but at least 1500 or more people drowned in the shipwreck. When survivors were asked to recall this night and what may have happened, they could all say there was “no moon”. Many also said the night was silent and motionless. Lawerence Beesley, who was a passenger described the sky as a “setting made [only] for them in which to display their wonder” which showed how close and beautiful the sky was when meeting the waterline. Forensic astronomy comes into play when Beesley realizes they are being rescued and noticed the sky in the east is brightened at the end of his lifeboat saying, “First a beautiful, quiet shimmer away in the east, then a soft golden glow that crept up stealthily from behind the sky-line...And next the stars died, slowly,– save one which remained long after the others just above the horizon.” The star that Beesley is speaking of is believed to be Venus.

=== Paul Revere’s Midnight Ride ===
On April 18 thru 19, Paul Revere went across the Boston Harbor by rowboat. As the moon rose to the east, Revere then went by horse to Charleston for his “Midnight Ride”. In the poem. It is spring, and the general, Thomas Gage, was informed of large amounts of ammo the colonist had in Concord. Gage ordered soldiers to seize these weapons on April 18, 1775. In the poem, it tells about Revere's “Midnight Ride” from Boston to Charlestown to alert others of the British advance: “Silently [he] rowed to the Charlestown shore, Just as the moon rose over the bay... The Somerset, British man-of-war;” Multiple times throughout the poem the Moon is mentioned, but any time the Moon is mentioned, its placement is not correct in forensic astronomy. Even though the placements from the poem were not correct, later forensic astronomy findings showed where the moon rose correctly the night Paul Revere made his “Midnight Ride”, but revealed that if Paul was crossed where he did he would have been seen and would have never made it to his destination in Charleston because his rowboat would have never made it. The “southeastern position of the moon” explains why Paul Revere's “Midnight Ride” was successful.

=== The Moon and tides in World War II ===
The Japanese brought the United States into World War II when they attacked Pearl Harbor. On the morning of the Pearl Harbor attack, it is believed that the moonlight was so bright that it allowed a U.S. Navy minesweeper to see a Japanese midget submarine at the entrance just before the attack, but it is believed astronomical understandings were used to the attacker's advantage to decide when they would attack.

=== Pearl Harbor 1941: The Waning Moon and the Rising Sun ===
When the Japanese attacked Pearl Harbor, the decision was calculated, and they knew during this time there would not be much American security. The Japanese knew that a full moon would allow easier movement for themselves because of how bright the Moon would shine. The Japanese were aware of the phase the moon was about to go through. The Japanese knew there would be a gibbous Moon on December 7, 1941. A gibbous moon rises in the evening, reaches its highest at midnight, and then stays bright and peaks mainly until dawn. Table 7.1 below shows that a gibbous moon did happen on December 7, 1941, at Pearl Harbor. Because of Table 7.1, forensic astronomy shows that the Japanese plan was not a coincidence but a planned astronomical attack. There is evidence of this because the creator of the Pearl Harbor attack Admiral Isoroku Yamamoto wrote a letter stating: “to launch a surprise attack with all their air strength, risking themselves on a moon-light night or at dawn” (Prange 1981: 16)”. There is further evidence from Commander Mitsuo Fuchida of his famous message “Tora, tora, tora”, which translated to “tiger, tiger, tiger”. He later revealed this messaged meant that the Japanese had successfully reached without notice and the attack was in place.

=== November 1943 Allied assault on the Pacific island of Tarawa ===
A forensic astronomer, Don Olson, was brought this case by one of his colleagues who had been studying this attack. Olson's colleague wanted to know what happened and how did the mission go wrong for the U.S. Marines. On this mission, more than 1000 U.S. Marines were killed. Don Olson was able to use forensic astronomy and figure out that no one was to blame, but the Moon was farthest away from Earth two days in that year, which caused a low tide to be created. Olson took his findings, and they were presented to Tarawa survivors to offer them closure.

== Forensic astronomy in art ==
=== Monet’s The Cliff, Etretat, Sunset ===
Claude Monet created almost 2,000 paintings during his career, including his painting of the sunset on a winter afternoon in 1883. The painting is of a cliff that faces the English Channel called Falaise d’Amont where the north-east half of the cliff is called the Porte d’ Amont, which means “upstream portal”, and the southwest half is called “Porte d’Aval”, which means “downstream portal”. The pyramid-shaped rock is called the Aiguille, which means “needle”. When people look farther southwest, there is another bay and beach which can only be accessed when the tide is low called the Manneporte, which means “great portal”. When looking back toward the northeast a completely new view of the Porte d’Amont and Needle can be seen. When people walked along the curve of the beach Etretat, the sun overlaps the Needle In a farther distance. In the southwest part of Etretat Beach, the Needle completely disappears because it is behind the cliff. Once people have walked northeast, The Needle loses the end of the Aval arch. At certain points to the person's eye, the Needle forms a perfect pyramid in the sun's horizon. By taking into consideration all of Monet's paintings of the Etretat beach and the shadows of the Porte d’ Aval and Needle, Monet's easel's exact placement can be determined due to this forensic astronomy.

== See also ==
- Forensic meteorology
- Archeoastronomy
- Astronomical chronology
