= Margita Kresáková =

Slovak astronomer

Margita Kresáková (née Vozárová; 21 May 1927 – 1994) was a Slovak astronomer.

She discovered comet C/1954 O1 on 28 July 1954, becoming just the second woman to discover a comet at the Skalnaté pleso Observatory. She married Slovak astronomer Ľubor Kresák in 1954 and they had one daughter.

Kresáková was a member of the International Astronomical Union. She wrote a 1966 paper on meteor stream activity.

The minor planet 9821 Gitakresáková is named after her.
