= Červená hora (Nízký Jeseník) =

Mountain in the Czech Republic

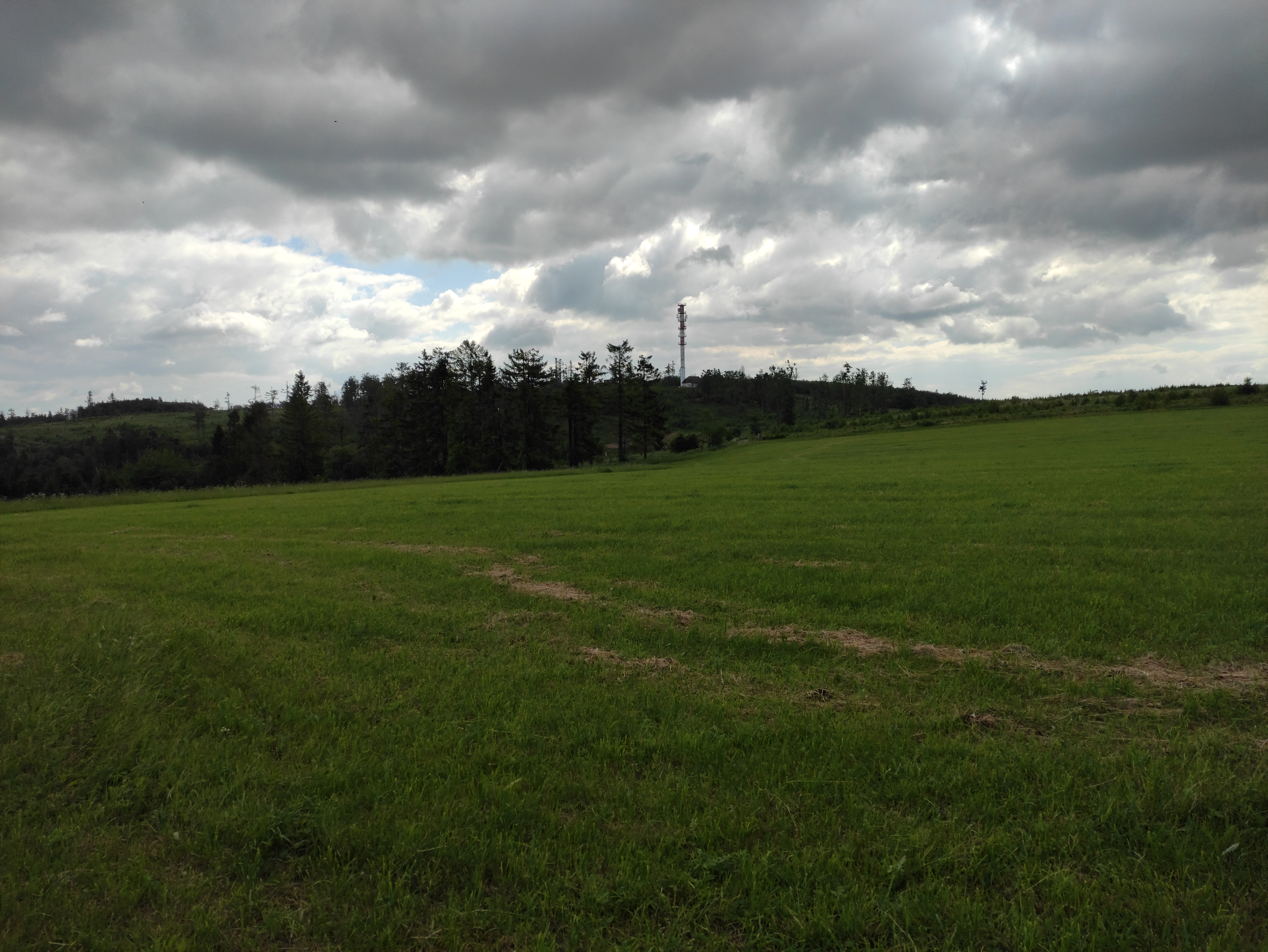

Highest point
- Elevation: 749 m (2,457 ft)
- Prominence: 116 m (381 ft)
- Isolation: 10.2 km (6.3 mi)
- Coordinates: 49°46′36″N 17°32′30″E

Geography
- Location within Czech Republic
- Location: Budišov nad Budišovkou
- Parent range: Nízký Jeseník

Červená hora (meaning 'red mountain') is a mountain in the Nízký Jeseník range in the Moravian-Silesian Region of the Czech Republic. It is located in the territory of Budišov nad Budišovkou. With 749 metres (2,457 ft) above sea level it is the highest hill of the Domašov Highlands, which are a part of the Nízký Jeseník, and the highest point in the Opava District. A hydrometeorological station and a station of the European Fireball Network at the same time is located here.

== Climate ==
Červená hora has a humid continental climate (Köppen Dfb). The annual average temperature is 6.6 °C (43.9 °F), the hottest month in July is 16.7 °C (62.1 °F), and the coldest month is −3.6 °C (25.5 °F) in January. The annual precipitation is 752.5 millimetres (29.63 in), of which July is the wettest with 97.1 millimetres (3.82 in), while February is the driest with only 44.5 millimetres (1.75 in). The extreme temperature throughout the year ranged from −26.0 °C (−14.8 °F) on 12 January 1987 to 32.6 °C (90.7 °F) on 30 July 1994.

Climate data for Červená hora (1991−2020 normals, extremes 1961-present)
Month	Jan	Feb	Mar	Apr	May	Jun	Jul	Aug	Sep	Oct	Nov	Dec	Year
Record high °C (°F)	10.4 (50.7)	15.5 (59.9)	19.4 (66.9)	24.3 (75.7)	27.7 (81.9)	31.6 (88.9)	32.6 (90.7)	32.5 (90.5)	29.1 (84.4)	21.9 (71.4)	17.4 (63.3)	11.7 (53.1)	32.6 (90.7)
Mean daily maximum °C (°F)	−1.4 (29.5)	0.3 (32.5)	4.7 (40.5)	11.6 (52.9)	16.0 (60.8)	19.6 (67.3)	21.9 (71.4)	21.8 (71.2)	16.0 (60.8)	10.0 (50.0)	4.3 (39.7)	−0.7 (30.7)	10.3 (50.5)
Daily mean °C (°F)	−3.6 (25.5)	−2.4 (27.7)	1.1 (34.0)	6.8 (44.2)	11.3 (52.3)	14.7 (58.5)	16.7 (62.1)	16.6 (61.9)	11.7 (53.1)	6.6 (43.9)	1.9 (35.4)	−2.6 (27.3)	6.6 (43.9)
Mean daily minimum °C (°F)	−5.6 (21.9)	−4.7 (23.5)	−1.7 (28.9)	3.2 (37.8)	7.5 (45.5)	10.9 (51.6)	12.9 (55.2)	12.9 (55.2)	8.8 (47.8)	4.3 (39.7)	0.0 (32.0)	−4.5 (23.9)	3.7 (38.7)
Record low °C (°F)	−26.0 (−14.8)	−24.2 (−11.6)	−20.0 (−4.0)	−9.3 (15.3)	−4.8 (23.4)	−1.3 (29.7)	2.0 (35.6)	0.4 (32.7)	−2.1 (28.2)	−9.0 (15.8)	−13.4 (7.9)	−21.2 (−6.2)	−26.0 (−14.8)
Average precipitation mm (inches)	42.7 (1.68)	39.3 (1.55)	50.7 (2.00)	44.5 (1.75)	84.2 (3.31)	85.3 (3.36)	97.1 (3.82)	80.7 (3.18)	73.9 (2.91)	57.6 (2.27)	50.2 (1.98)	46.3 (1.82)	752.5 (29.63)
Average snowfall cm (inches)	33.2 (13.1)	30.7 (12.1)	22.6 (8.9)	7.0 (2.8)	0.3 (0.1)	0.0 (0.0)	0.0 (0.0)	0.0 (0.0)	0.1 (0.0)	2.8 (1.1)	15.7 (6.2)	28.3 (11.1)	140.7 (55.4)
Average precipitation days	9.8	9.3	10.5	8.0	10.9	10.4	10.8	9.4	9.2	8.7	9.3	9.5	115.7
Average relative humidity (%)	91.6	87.1	80.9	69.8	72.1	73.2	71.1	70.6	78.9	86.4	91.3	93.1	80.5
Mean monthly sunshine hours	50.0	71.7	122.1	186.4	215.2	219.1	235.9	234.0	161.0	105.7	50.8	38.5	1,691
Source 1: NCEI
Source 2: Czech Hydrometeorological Institute

== See also ==
- Earth-grazing meteoroid of 13 October 1990
