= Skalnaté pleso Observatory =

Astronomical and meteorological observatory in the Tatra Mountains, Slovakia

Skalnate Pleso observatory
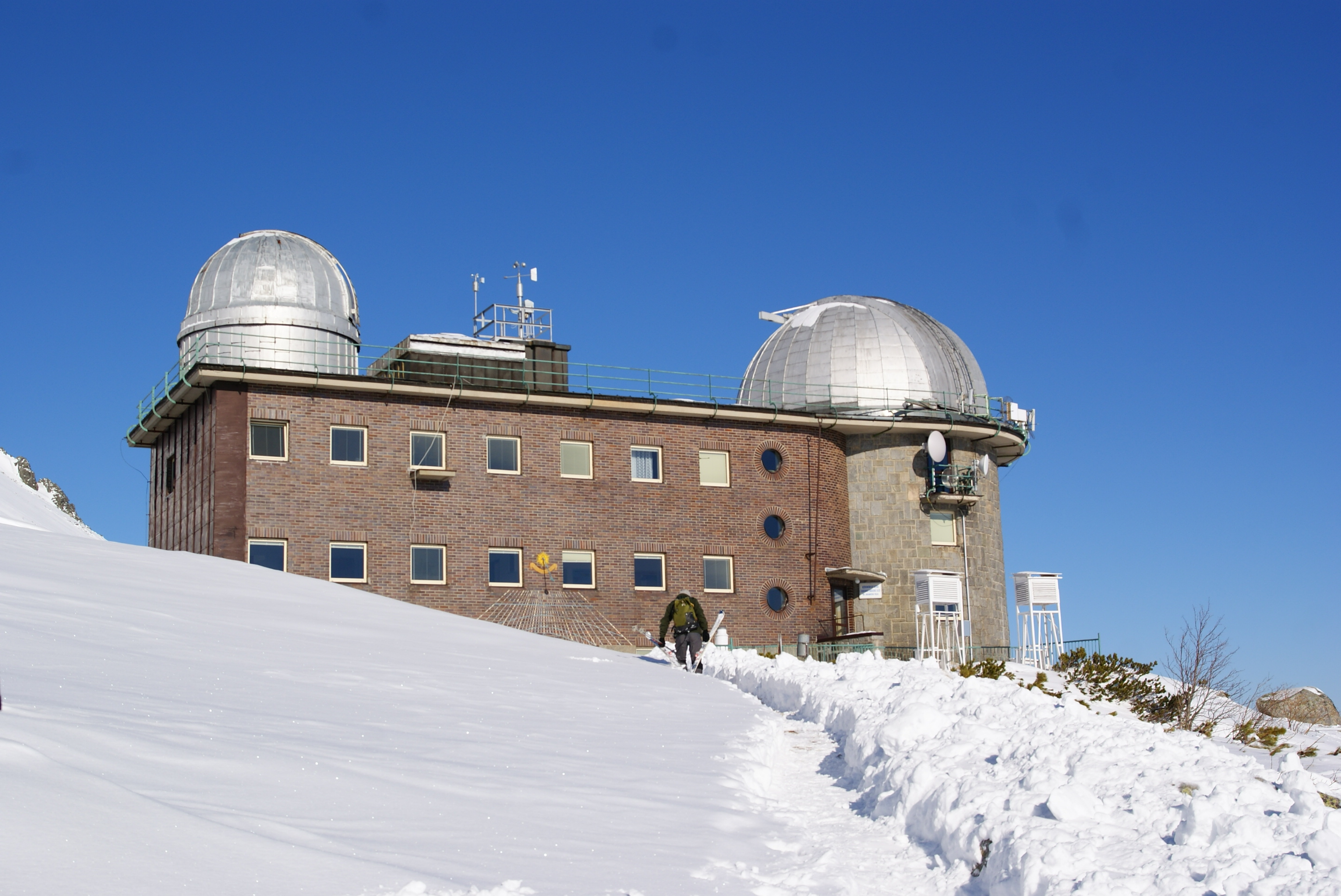
- Skalnaté pleso Observatory
- Alternative names: Skalnate pleso observatory
- Observatory code: 056
- Location: Vysoké Tatry, Poprad District, Prešov Region, Slovakia
- Coordinates: 49°11′22″N 20°14′02″E
- Altitude: 1,786 m (5,860 ft)
- Established: 1943
- Website: www.astro.sk/veda-a-vyskum/observatoria/observatorium-skalnate-pleso/,%20https://web.astro.sk/veda-a-vyskum/observatoria/observatorium-skalnate-pleso/
- Related media on Commons

The Skalnaté pleso Observatory (Slovak: Observatórium Skalnaté pleso) is an astronomical and meteorological observatory located in the locality of the same name in the High Tatra Mountains in Slovakia, at coordinates 49°11′21.77″N 20°14′1.49″E and at an altitude of 1,786 metres (5,860 ft) on the south-eastern slopes of Lomnický štít near Tatranská Lomnica.

Its MPC observatory code is 056 Skalnate Pleso.

The observatory is named after a nearby mountain lake (Skalnaté pleso, literally: "Rocky Tarn").

The observatory, whose motto is Per aspera ad astra, began operating in 1943 under the direction of Antonín Bečvář.

The asteroid 2619 Skalnaté Pleso was named in honor of the observatory.

== Description ==
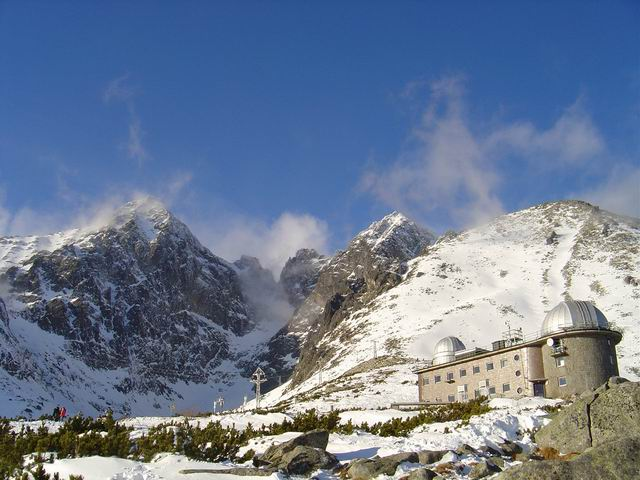
Skalnaté pleso Observatory in December 2004

The observatory produced the popular sky atlas Skalnate Pleso Atlas of the Heavens by Antonín Bečvář, who founded the observatory in 1943. It is also known for its visual comet hunting and for its astrometric observations and discoveries of minor planets.

Noted astronomers who worked at the observatory include Milan Antal, Antonín Mrkos, Ľudmila Pajdušáková and Margita Kresáková (née Vozárová), as well as Alois Paroubek and Regina Podstanická. Discoveries include the minor planets 1807 Slovakia and 1989 Tatry.

== Main instrumentation ==
The original instrumentation, a 0.6-metre reflecting telescope Zeiss and two 0.2-metre refracting telescopes, was replaced with a new 60 cm reflector in 1977, equipped with a photoelectric photometer, and with another 61 cm reflector in 2001, equipped with a CCD.

== Department of Interplanetary Matter ==
The department is particularly known for its studies of meteoroids. The main field of investigation is meteor showers, their parent bodies, their origin and their evolution. For this research the observatory uses radio waves through dedicated radar astronomy systems for the study of meteors, in collaboration with the Modra Observatory.

The observatory also operates an all-sky observation station equipped with cameras fitted with fisheye lenses and integrated into the European Fireball Network.

=== Department of Stellar Studies ===
The department has specialised in the study of variable stars, particularly those with large variability such as cataclysmic variables, symbiotic novae, Ap and Bp stars and peculiar stars. In the past it also participated in stellar studies conducted within the programmes of the Intercosmos consortium.

== Other activities ==
The observatory publishes its own scientific journal in English, Contributions of the Astronomical Observatory Skalnaté Pleso (CAOSP).

A weather station operated by the Institute of Geophysics of Bratislava is also installed at the observatory.

The observatory also studies ozone through radio observations from the Earth's surface.

== See also ==
- 2619 Skalnaté Pleso, asteroid
- Skalnaté pleso
- European Fireball Network
- Milan Antal
- Antonín Mrkos
- Ľudmila Pajdušáková
- Margita Vozárová
