= Ľudmila Pajdušáková =

Slovak astronomer

Ľudmila Pajdušáková (29 June 1916 – 6 October 1979) was a Slovak astronomer.

She specialized in solar astronomy, and also discovered a number of comets, including periodic comet 45P/Honda-Mrkos-Pajdušáková, and the non-periodic C/1946 K1 (Pajdušáková-Rotbart-Weber), C/1948 E1 (Pajdušáková-Mrkos), C/1951 C1 (Pajdušáková) and C/1953 X1 (Pajdušáková).

She observed at Skalnaté Pleso Observatory and became its third director from 1958 to 1979.

The asteroid 3636 Pajdušáková is named after her.

She was married to Antonín Mrkos. In a 1951 "Comet Notes" article in Publications of the Astronomical Society of the Pacific [PASP 63 (1951) 209], Leland E. Cunningham in discussing comet C/1951 C1 refers to her as "Miss Pajdušáková (Mrs. Mrkos)", and there was an astronomy book published in 1956 by Ľudmila Mrkosová-Pajdušáková, as well as various scientific papers under this name from approximately 1952–1958. However, their respective biographies do not seem to mention any such marriage which, after all, ended in a divorce.
