= Alexander Aubert =

English astronomer and businessman

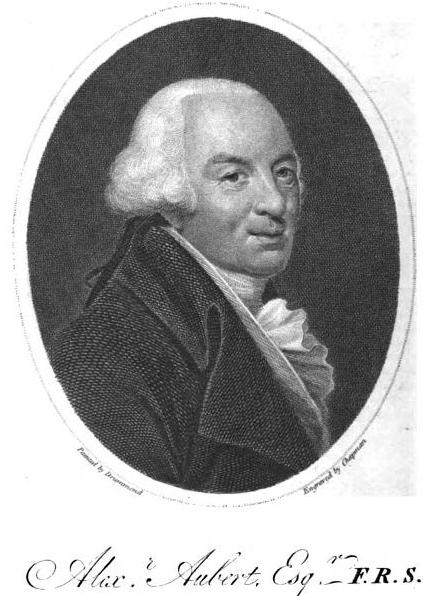
Alexander Aubert. by Drummond

Alexander Aubert FRS FSA, (1730–1805), was an English amateur astronomer and businessman.

== Life ==
He was born at Austin Friars, London, 11 May 1730. The appearance of the Great Comet of 1744 gave him, then a schoolboy at Geneva, a permanent bias towards astronomy; but he diligently prepared for a mercantile career in counting-houses at Geneva, Leghorn, and Genoa, and visited Rome in the jubilee year (1750). Returning to London in 1751, he was in the following year taken into partnership by his father. In 1753 he became a director, and some years later governor, of the London Assurance Company. He was elected a fellow of the Royal Society in 1772, and of the Society of Antiquaries in 1784.

In 1793 he received a diploma of admission to the St. Petersburg Academy of Sciences. He observed the transit of Venus of 3 June 1769 at Austin Friars, and that of Mercury, 4 May 1786 at an observatory built by him at Loampit Hill, near Deptford, and furnished with the best instruments by Short, Bird, Ramsden, and Dollond. Except that of Count Brühl, it was at that period the only well-equipped private establishment of the kind in England. In 1788 he purchased Highbury House, Islington, for 6,000 guineas, and erected on the grounds, with the assistance of his friend John Smeaton, the celebrated engineer, a new observatory on improved plans of his own.

His mechanical knowledge caused him to be appointed chairman of the trustees for the completion of Ramsgate Harbour, and his energy contributed materially to the ultimate success of Smeaton's designs. In 1792 with the start of the French Revolutionary Wars, Aubert headed a society for the suppression of sedition, and in 1797 he organised, and was appointed lieutenant-colonel of, the 'Loyal Islington Volunteers.'

While staying in the house of Mr. John Lloyd, of Wygfair, St. Asaph, he was struck with apoplexy, and died 19 October 1805, at the age of 75, highly esteemed both in scientific and commercial circles, and widely popular, owing to his genial manners and unstinted hospitality. His valuable astronomical library and instruments were sold and dispersed after his death. Amongst the latter were a Dollond 46-inch achromatic, aperture 3¾ inches, and the one Cassegrain reflector constructed by Short, of 24 inches focus and 6 aperture, known among opticians as 'Short's Dumpy.' Both had been originally made for Topham Beauclerk.

== Works ==
Two slight papers by Aubert appeared in the Philosophical Transactions of the Royal Society:

- A New Method of finding Time by Equal Altitudes (lxvi 92-8)
- An Account of the Meteors of 18 Aug and 4 Oct 1783 (lxxiv, 112-15).
