= Svratouch =

- Municipality
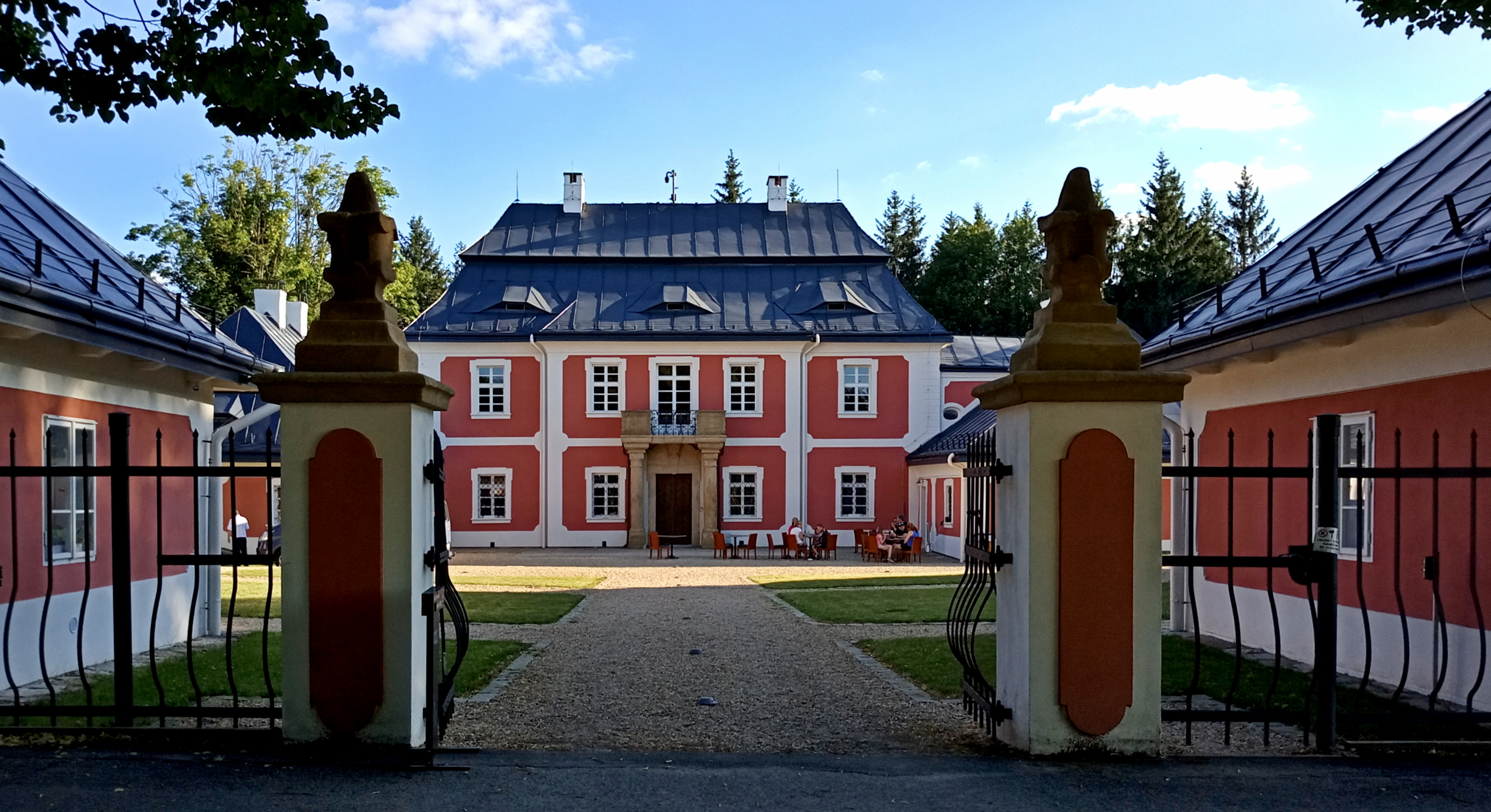
- Karlštejn hunting castle

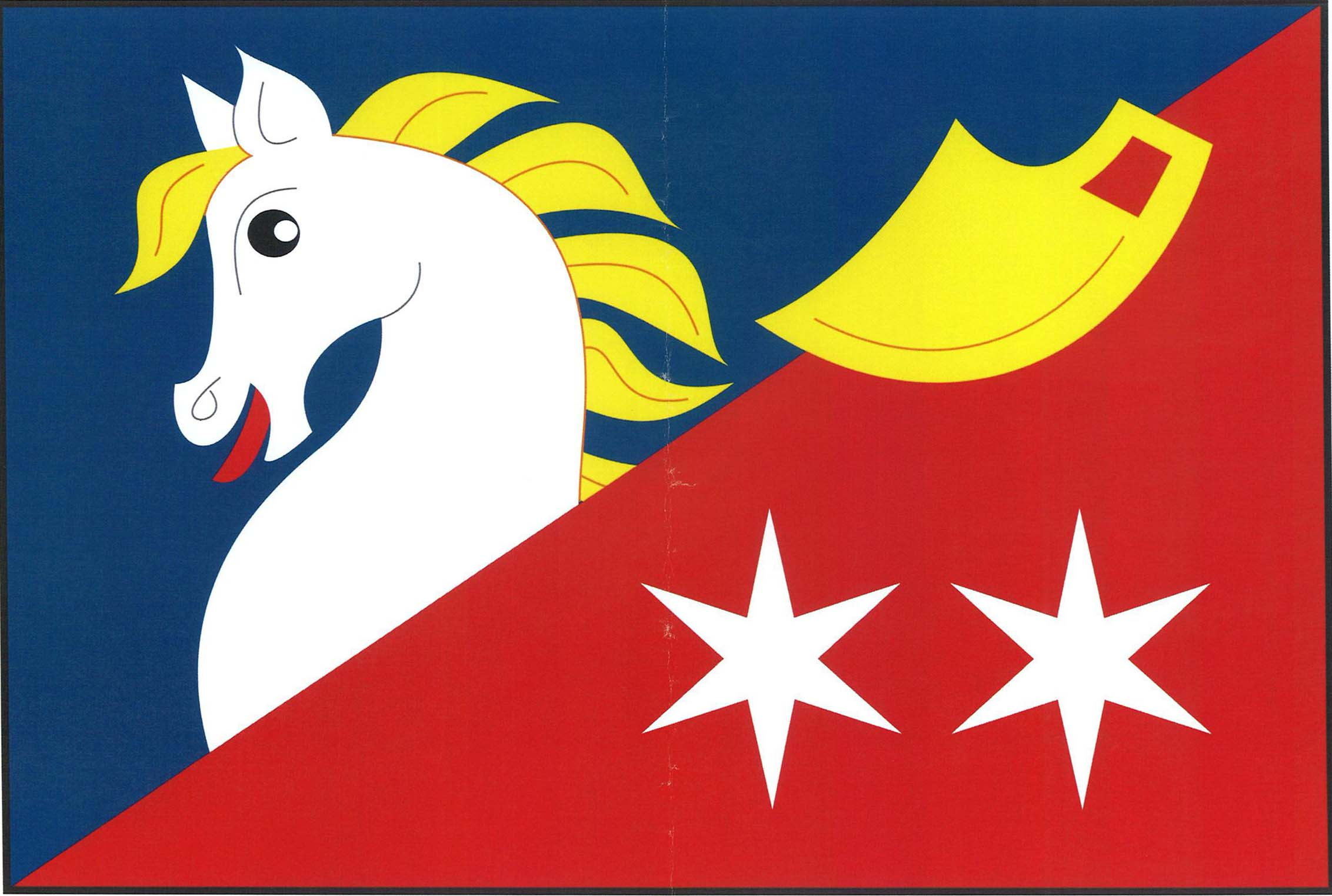
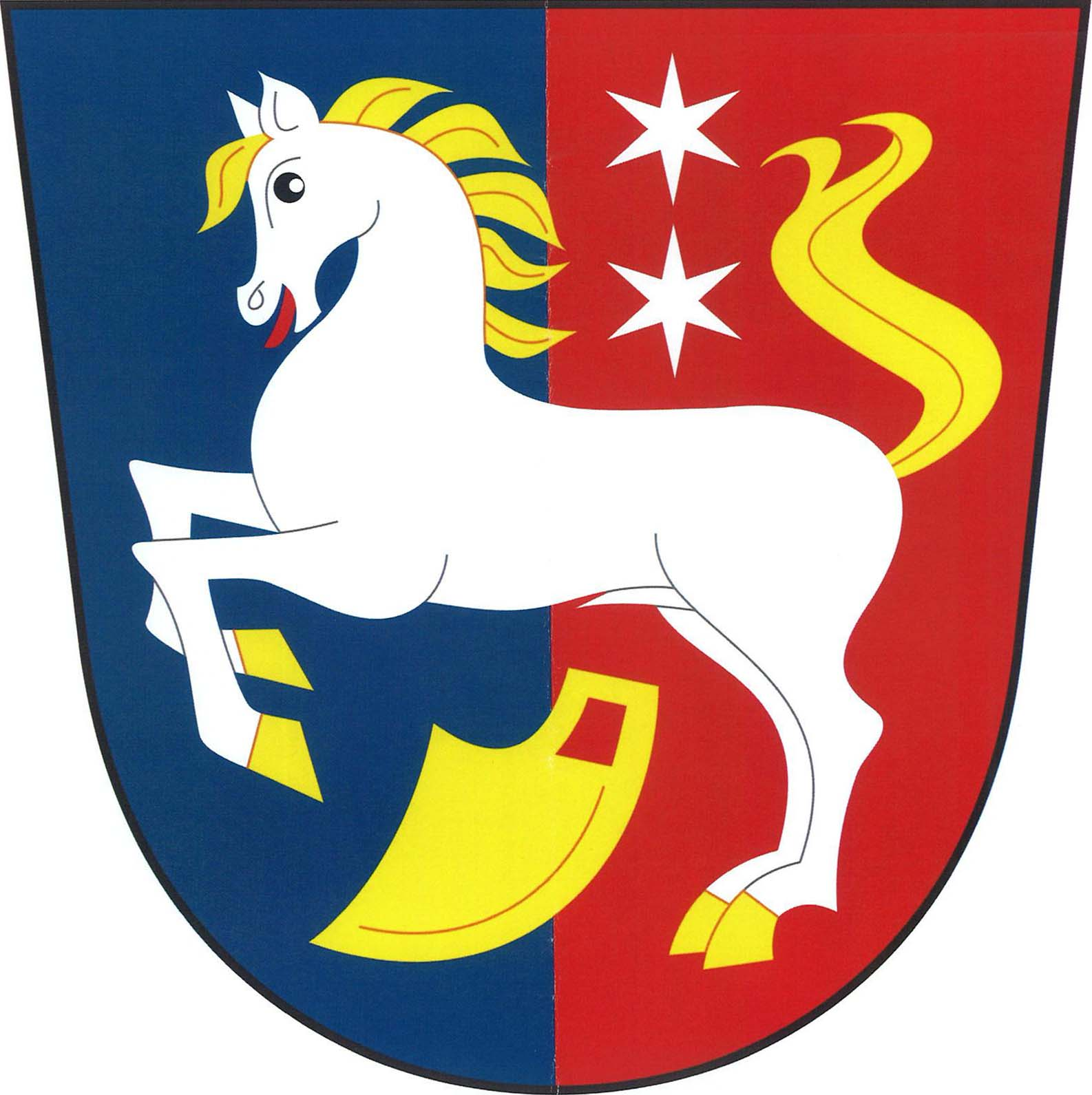
- Flag Coat of arms

- Location in the Czech Republic
- Coordinates: 49°43′28″N 16°2′3″E
- Country: Czech Republic
- Region: Pardubice
- District: Chrudim
- First mentioned: 1392

Area
  - Total: 12.72 km^{2} (4.91 sq mi)
- Elevation: 655 m (2,149 ft)

Population (2026-01-01)
  - Total: 905
  - Density: 71.1/km^{2} (184/sq mi)
- Time zone: UTC+1 (CET)
  - Summer (DST): UTC+2 (CEST)
- Postal code: 539 42
- Website: www.svratouch.cz

Svratouch is a municipality and village in Chrudim District in the Pardubice Region of the Czech Republic. It has about 900 inhabitants.

== Administrative division ==
Svratouch consists of two municipal parts (in brackets population according to the 2021 census):

- Svratouch (875)
- Karlštejn (8)

== Etymology ==
The name Svratouch was derived from the neighbouring town of Svratka.

== Geography ==
Svratouch is located about 30 kilometres (19 mi) southeast of Chrudim and 38 km (24 mi) southeast of Pardubice. It lies mostly in the Upper Svratka Highlands, only the western part of the municipal territory extends into the Iron Mountains. The highest point is the hill Karlštejn at 783 m (2,569 ft) above sea level. The municipality lies within the Žďárské vrchy Protected Landscape Area.

=== Climate ===
Climate data for Svratouch (1991–2020)
Month	Jan	Feb	Mar	Apr	May	Jun	Jul	Aug	Sep	Oct	Nov	Dec	Year
Record high °C (°F)	13.3 (55.9)	15.1 (59.2)	18.9 (66.0)	24.3 (75.7)	29.6 (85.3)	31.8 (89.2)	33.2 (91.8)	33.7 (92.7)	30.3 (86.5)	22.0 (71.6)	16.1 (61.0)	11.8 (53.2)	33.7 (92.7)
Mean daily maximum °C (°F)	−0.6 (30.9)	0.7 (33.3)	5.1 (41.2)	11.4 (52.5)	16.0 (60.8)	19.3 (66.7)	21.6 (70.9)	21.7 (71.1)	16.1 (61.0)	10.4 (50.7)	4.3 (39.7)	0.1 (32.2)	10.5 (50.9)
Daily mean °C (°F)	−2.8 (27.0)	−1.9 (28.6)	1.5 (34.7)	6.9 (44.4)	11.5 (52.7)	14.9 (58.8)	16.8 (62.2)	16.8 (62.2)	11.9 (53.4)	7.0 (44.6)	2.1 (35.8)	−1.9 (28.6)	6.9 (44.4)
Mean daily minimum °C (°F)	−5.0 (23.0)	−4.3 (24.3)	−1.3 (29.7)	3.2 (37.8)	7.4 (45.3)	10.8 (51.4)	12.7 (54.9)	12.7 (54.9)	8.7 (47.7)	4.4 (39.9)	0.1 (32.2)	−4.0 (24.8)	3.8 (38.8)
Record low °C (°F)	−23.7 (−10.7)	−20.4 (−4.7)	−16.3 (2.7)	−9.5 (14.9)	−3.9 (25.0)	1.3 (34.3)	4.2 (39.6)	4.4 (39.9)	−0.9 (30.4)	−7.3 (18.9)	−14.0 (6.8)	−18.9 (−2.0)	−23.7 (−10.7)
Average precipitation mm (inches)	44.7 (1.76)	40.0 (1.57)	59.9 (2.36)	47.6 (1.87)	85.2 (3.35)	91.4 (3.60)	102.8 (4.05)	90.8 (3.57)	74.1 (2.92)	53.1 (2.09)	47.0 (1.85)	48.1 (1.89)	784.7 (30.89)
Average precipitation days (≥ 1.0 mm)	10.6	9.2	11.3	8.2	10.7	10.9	11.1	9.6	9.1	9.0	9.1	10.8	119.6
Mean monthly sunshine hours	54.6	76.9	121.4	180.2	212.5	213.2	228.2	229.7	157.7	108.1	49.1	44.3	1,675.9
Source: NOAA

== History ==
The first written mention of Svratouch is from 1392. Until the establishment of an independent municipality in 1848, the village belonged to the Rychmburk estate.

== Demographics ==
Historical population

Year	Pop.	±%
1869	1,609	—
1880	1,606	−0.2%
1890	1,561	−2.8%
1900	1,521	−2.6%
1910	1,558	+2.4%

Year	Pop.	±%
1921	1,489	−4.4%
1930	1,375	−7.7%
1950	1,049	−23.7%
1961	1,137	+8.4%
1970	1,069	−6.0%

Year	Pop.	±%
1980	1,014	−5.1%
1991	926	−8.7%
2001	899	−2.9%
2011	873	−2.9%
2021	883	+1.1%

Source: Censuses

== Transport ==
There are no railways or major roads passing through the municipality.

== Sights ==
The most important monument is the hunting castle in Karlštejn. It was built in the Baroque style in 1770–1775. Today it serves as a hotel and restaurant.

== See also ==
- Earth-grazing meteoroid of 13 October 1990
