= European Fireball Network =

International astronomy organization based in Central Europe

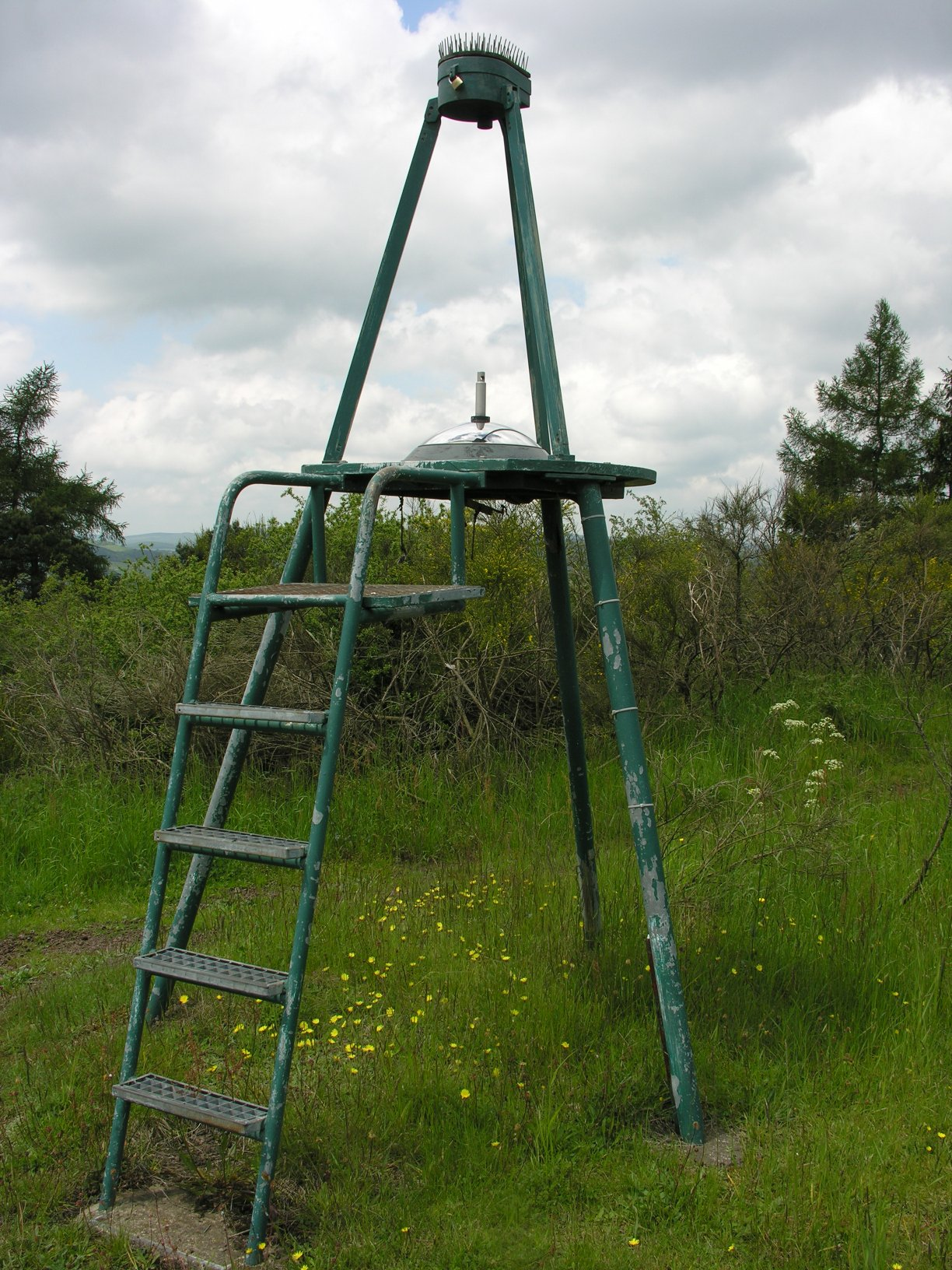
- A network camera at Daun, Germany. The camera itself is located on top of the tripod and collects light from the reflecting hemisphere in the middle of the construction.
- Formation: 1959; 67 years ago
- Type: Camera network
- Legal status: Active
- Purpose: Record meteorite falls
- Region served: Germany, Czech Republic, Belgium, Luxembourg, Switzerland and Austria
- Parent organization: The German Aerospace Center (DLR) and the Institute of Planetary Research in Prague (Ondřejov Observatory).
- Website: meteor.asu.cas.cz/en/en/

European Fireball Network is an international astronomy organization based in Central Europe. Its purpose is systematic and simultaneous night observation of meteors.

== History ==
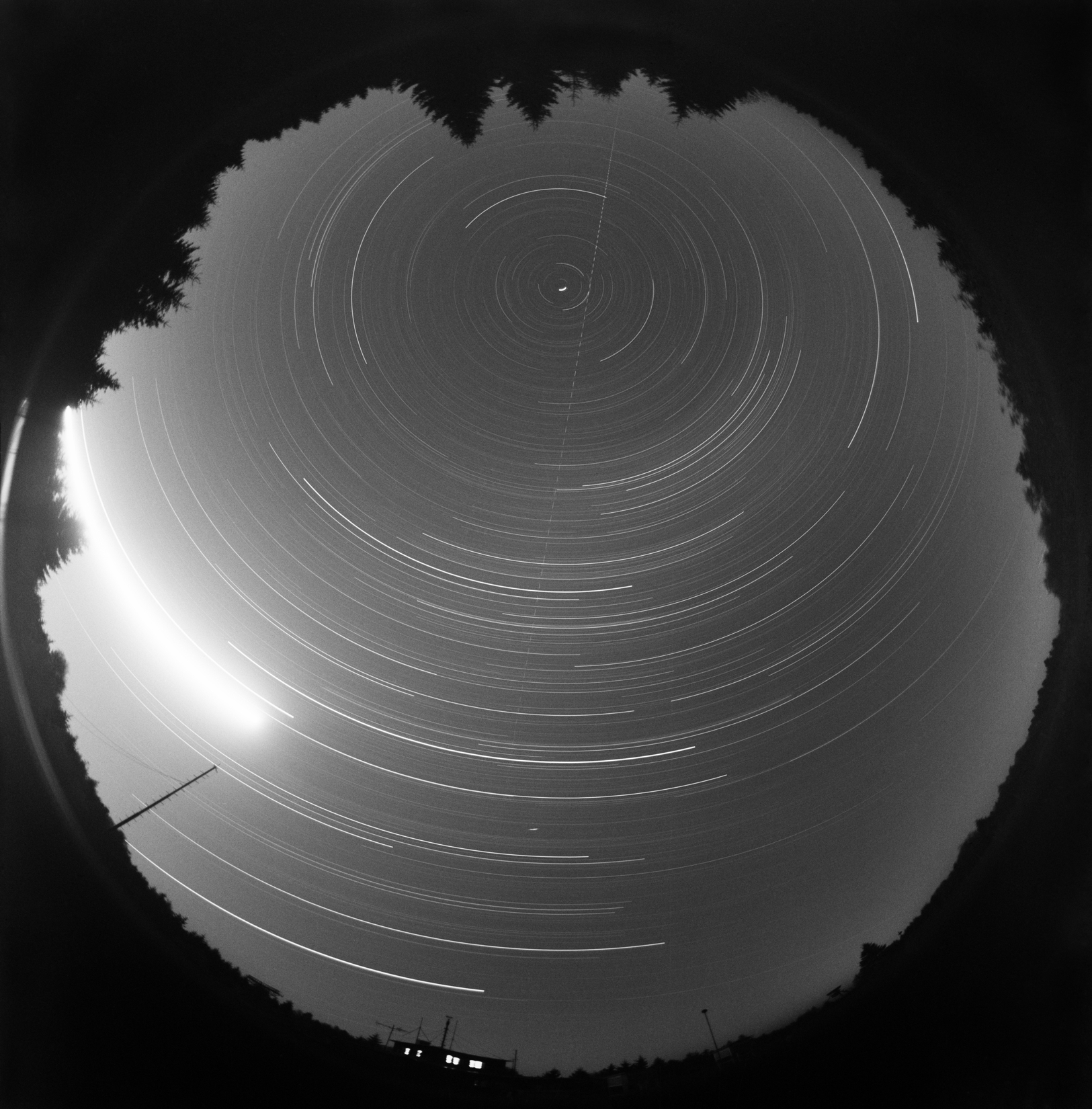
All-sky photo with the Earth-grazing meteoroid of 13 October 1990 (the light track across the picture going from the south to the north) taken at Červená hora, one of the stations of the European Fireball Network. The bright track on the left is the Moon.

The network was initially located at the Ondřejov Observatory, Czech Republic, after the fall of the Příbram meteorite on 7 April 1959, which was the first meteorite simultaneously observed by several stations. By 1963, the network consisted of five stations. It was later (about 1968) expanded by the installation of about 15 new stations in Germany and named the European Fireball Network. Until 2022 the network was jointly operated by the German Aerospace Center (DLR) and the Institute of Planetary Research in Prague (Ondřejov Observatory).

== Description ==
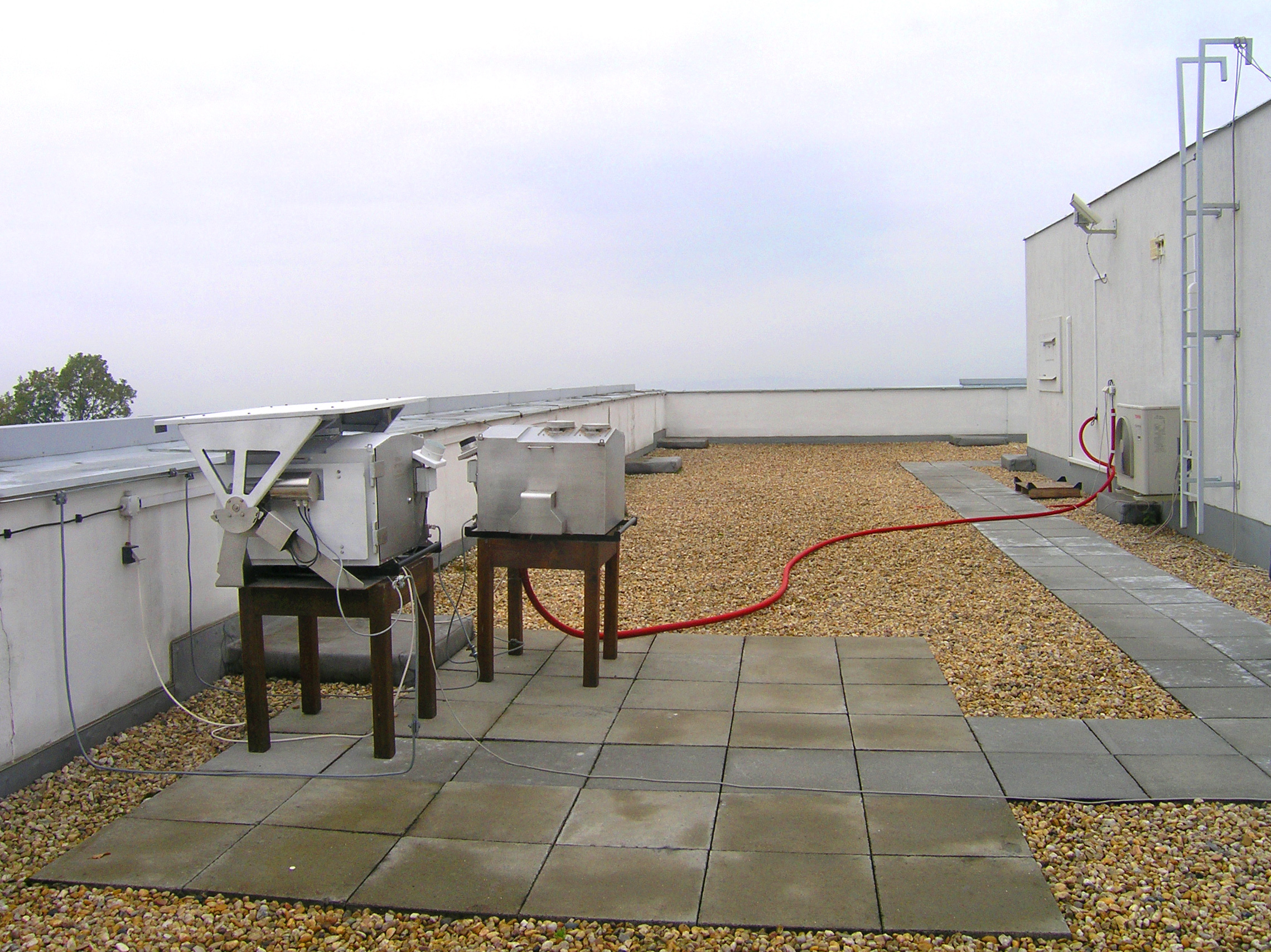
Cameras at Ondřejov, Czech Republic

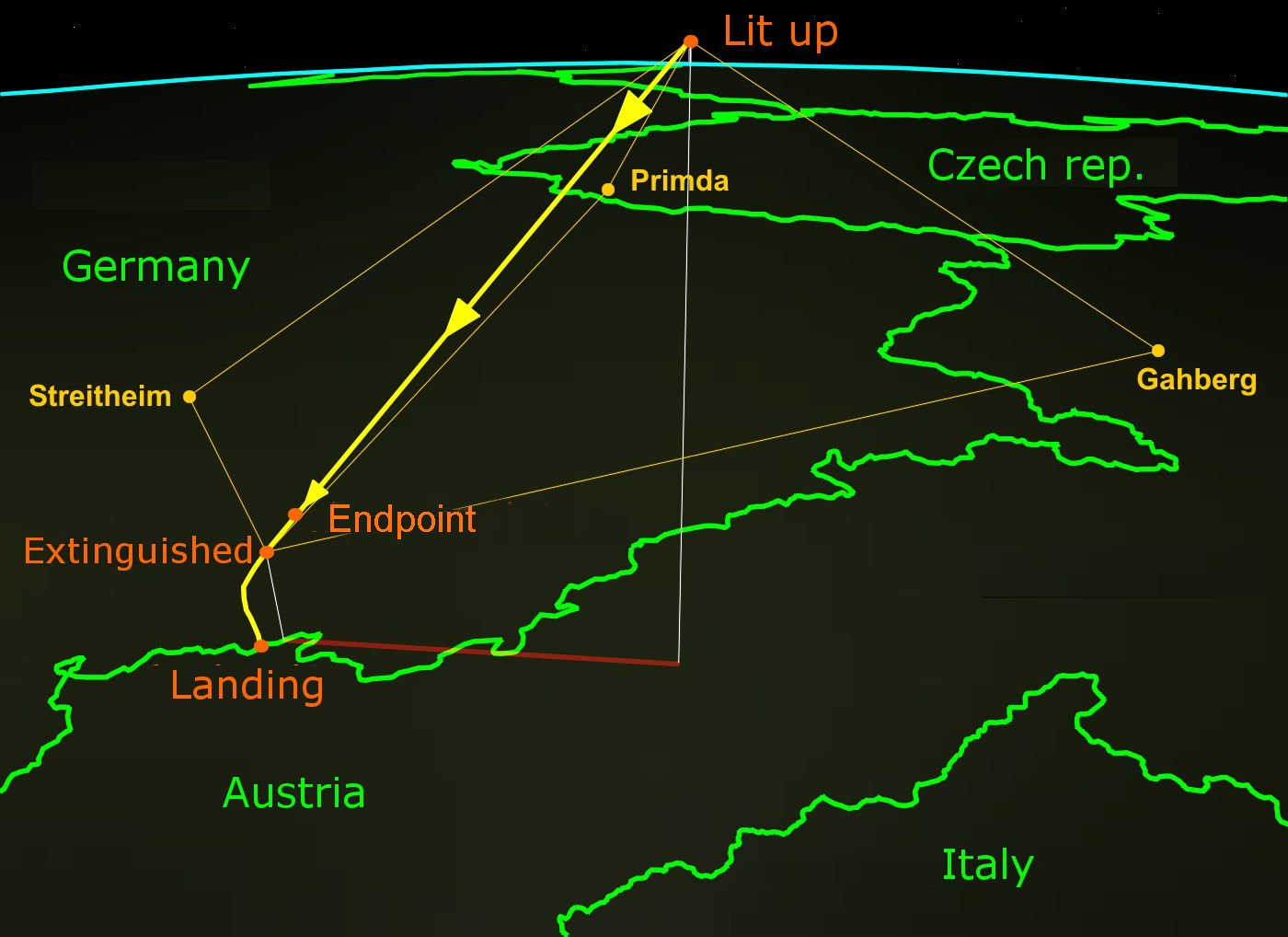
3D triangulation of the atmospheric trajectory of Neuschwanstein by the European Fireball Network stations

In mid-2020s, the network consisted of stations located in the Czech Republic, Slovakia, Germany, and Austria. The cameras are separated by a distance of about 100 kilometres (62 mi). Cameras are equipped with fisheye lenses and are directed towards the zenith. Sky recordings are made every night with a long exposure time. Quickly moving bright objects (meteors) appear as broken traces in the images, and from the exposure time, the burn time and the angular velocity of the object can be determined. An important feature of the network is the simultaneous observation of an object from several stations that allows accurate three-dimensional reconstruction of its trajectory using triangulation. Its production rate was reported to be about 10,000 images per year documenting about 1200 hours of clear sky observations. Its cameras detect about 50 large meteors per year.

== Results ==
The most significant observation by the network to date is the fall of the Neuschwanstein meteorite on 6 April 2002. Detailed data obtained from several stations allowed accurate reconstruction not only of the meteor path in the Earth atmosphere, but also of its orbit around the Sun. The similarity of the reconstructed orbits of the Neuschwanstein and Příbram allowed associating these meteorites to the same parent body.

== See also ==
- Glossary of meteoritics
- List of astronomical societies
- FREYA – Czech scientific hyperspectral camera
