= 1972 Great Daylight Fireball =

Atmospheric phenomenon

- Date: August 10, 1972
- Location: United States, Canada

External media

Images
- Earthgrazer: The Great Daylight Fireball of 1972 (Credit & Copyright: Antarctic search for meteorites program, Case Western Reserve University, James M. Baker)

Video
- Grand Teton Meteor Near Miss!

The Great Daylight Fireball (also known as the Grand Teton Meteor) was an Earth-grazing fireball that passed within 57 kilometres (35 mi; 187,000 ft) of Earth's surface at 20:29 UTC on August 10, 1972. It entered Earth's atmosphere at a speed of 15 km/s (54,000 km/h; 33,554 mph) in daylight over Utah, United States (14:30 local time) and passed northwards leaving the atmosphere over Alberta, Canada. It was seen by many people and recorded on film and by space-borne sensors. An eyewitness to the event, located in Missoula, Montana, saw the bolide pass directly overhead and heard a double sonic boom. The smoke trail lingered in the atmosphere for several minutes.

The atmospheric pass modified the object's mass and orbit around the Sun. A 1994 study found that it is probably still in an Earth-crossing orbit and predicted that it would pass close to Earth again in August 1997. However, the object has not been observed again and so its post-encounter orbit remains unknown.

== Description ==
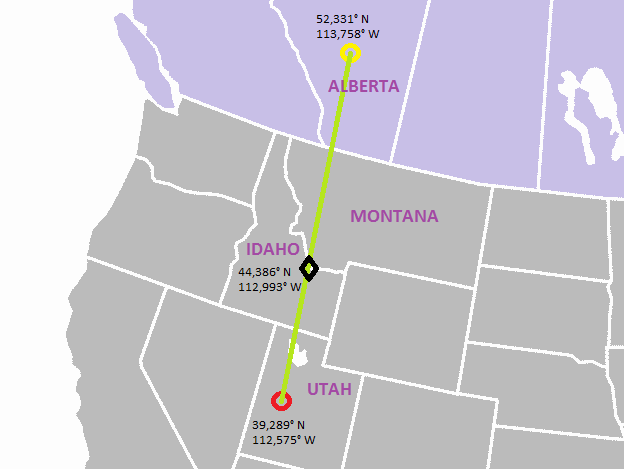
Map of the object's trajectory from Z. Ceplecha (1994). The red icon marks atmospheric entry over Utah, the black icon marks perigee over Idaho, and the yellow icon marks exit over Alberta.

Analysis of its appearance and trajectory showed the object was about 3 to 14 meters (10 to 46 feet) in diameter, depending on whether it was a comet made of ice or a stony and therefore denser asteroid. Other sources identified it as an Apollo asteroid in an Earth-crossing orbit that would make a subsequent close approach to Earth in August 1997. In 1994, Czech astronomer Zdeněk Ceplecha reanalysed the data and suggested the passage would have reduced the asteroid's mass to about a third or half of its original mass, reducing its diameter to 2 to 10 meters (7 to 33 feet).

The object was tracked by military surveillance systems and sufficient data obtained to determine its orbit both before and after its 100-second passage through Earth's atmosphere. Its velocity was reduced by about 0.8 km/s (2,880 km/h; 1,790 mph) and the encounter significantly changed its orbital inclination from 15 degrees to 7 degrees. If it had not entered at such a grazing angle, this meteoroid would have lost all its velocity in the upper atmosphere, possibly ending in an airburst, and any remnant would have fallen at terminal velocity.

== See also ==
- List of asteroid close approaches to Earth
