= 1913 Great Meteor Procession =

Meteor shower across the Western Hemisphere

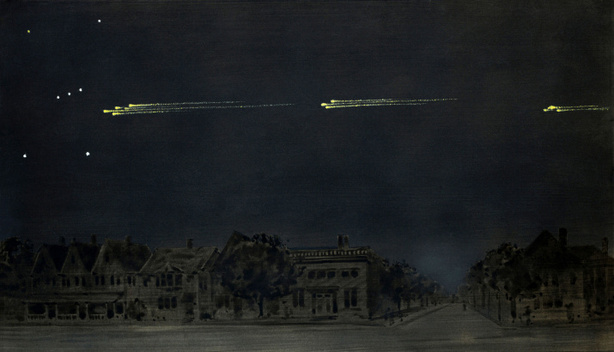
- Painting by Gustav Hahn as observed near High Park in Toronto.
- Date: February 9, 1913
- Location: Canada; Dominion of Newfoundland; Northeastern United States; Bermuda; Tropical South Atlantic
- Also known as: The Cyrillid Shower

On February 9, 1913, a significant meteoric phenomenon was reported from locations across Canada, the northeastern United States, Bermuda, and from many ships at sea as far south as Brazil, giving a total recorded ground track of over 11,000 km (7,000 miles), and becoming known as the Great Meteor Procession of 1913. The meteors were particularly unusual in that there was no apparent radiant, the point in the sky from which meteors usually appear to originate. The observations were analysed in detail, later the same year, by the astronomer Clarence Chant, leading him to conclude that as all accounts were positioned along a great circle arc, the source had been a small, short-lived temporary satellite of the Earth.

John A. O'Keefe, who conducted several studies of the event, proposed that the meteors should be referred to as the Cyrillids, in reference to the feast day of Cyril of Alexandria (February 9 in the Roman Catholic calendar from 1882 to 1969).

== Events of February 9 ==
The evening of February 9 was cloudy across much of the densely populated northeast United States, meaning that some 30 million potential observers were for the most part unaware of the phenomenon. Nevertheless, more than a hundred individual reports – largely from more remote areas of Canada – were later collected by Clarence Chant, with additional observations unearthed by later researchers. At around 21:00 EST, witnesses were surprised to see a procession of between 40 and 60 bright, slow-moving fireballs moving from horizon to horizon in a practically identical path. Individual fireballs were visible for at least 30 to 40 seconds, and the entire procession took some 5 minutes to cross the sky. An observer at Appin, Ontario, described its appearance at one of the most easterly parts of its track across Canada:

A huge meteor appeared travelling from northwest by west to southeast, which, as it approached, was seen to be in two parts and looked like two bars of flaming material, one following the other. They were throwing out a constant stream of sparks and after they had passed they shot out balls of fire straight ahead that travelled more rapidly than the main bodies. They seemed to pass over slowly and were in sight about five minutes. Immediately after their disappearance in the southeast a ball of clear fire, that looked like a big star, passed across the sky in their wake. This ball did not have a tail or show sparks of any kind. Instead of being yellow like the meteors, it was clear like a star.

Subsequent observers also noted a large, white, tail-less body bringing up the rear, but the various bodies making up the meteor procession continued to disintegrate and to travel at different rates throughout their course, so that by the time observations were made in Bermuda, the leading bodies were described as "like large arc lights in appearance, slightly violet in colour", followed closely by yellow and red fragments.

Research carried out in the 1950s by Alexander D. Mebane uncovered a handful of reports from newspaper archives in the northern United States. At Escanaba, Michigan, the Press stated the "end of the world was apprehended by many" as numerous meteors travelled across the northern horizon. In Batavia, New York, a few observers saw the meteors and many people heard a thundering noise, while other reports were made in Nunda-Dansville, New York (where several residents again thought the world was ending) and Osceola, Pennsylvania.

== February 10 ==
One curious feature of the reports, highlighted by Mebane, was that several appeared to indicate a second meteor procession on the same course around 5 hours later, although the Earth's rotation meant that there was no obvious mechanism to explain this. One observer, an A. W. Brown from Thamesville, Ontario, reported seeing both the initial meteor procession and a second one on the same course at 02:20 the next morning. Chant's original report also referred to a series of three groups of "dark objects" which passed, on the same course as the previous meteors, from west to east over Toronto on the afternoon of February 10, which he suggested were "something of a meteoric nature".

== Accompanying sounds ==
William Henry Pickering noted that at eight stations in Canada a trembling of the house or ground was felt. In many other places loud, thunder-like sounds were heard, occasionally by people who had not seen the meteors themselves. Pickering used the sound reports to perform a check on the height of the meteors, which he calculated at 56 km (35 miles).

== Analysis ==
The first detailed study of the reports was produced by the Canadian astronomer Clarence Chant, who wrote about the meteors in vol. 7 of the Journal of the Royal Astronomical Society of Canada. The orbit was later discussed by Pickering and G. J. Burns, who concluded that it was essentially satellitic. Although this explanation was later attacked by Charles Wylie, who attempted to prove that the shower had a radiant, further studies by Lincoln LaPaz (who criticised Wylie's methods as "unscientific") and John A. O'Keefe showed that the meteors had most likely represented a body, or group of bodies, which had been temporarily captured into orbit about the Earth before disintegrating.

O'Keefe later suggested that the meteors, which he referred to as the "Cyrillids", could have in fact represented the last remnant of a circumterrestrial ring, formed from the ejecta of a postulated lunar volcano. This theory was a development of O'Keefe's unusual hypothesis on the origin of tektites.
