= Bohumila Bednářová =

Czech astronomer (1904–1985)

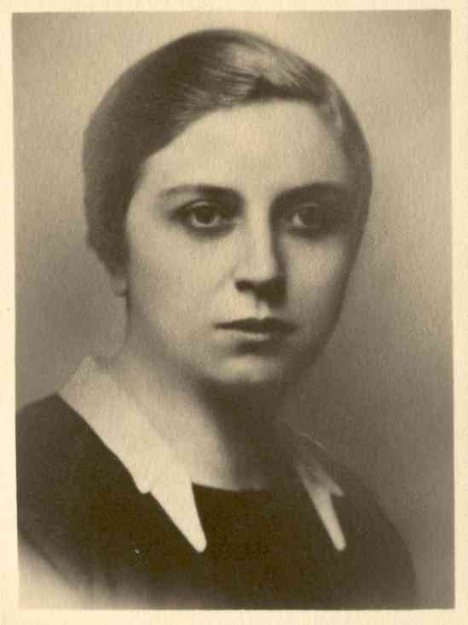
- Born: 7 February 1904; Přistoupim, Bohemia, Austria-Hungary
- Died: 23 August 1985 (aged 81); Prague, Czechoslovakia
- Education: Charles University
- Scientific career
- Fields: Astronomy
- Workplaces: Ondřejov Observatory, Astronomical Institute of the Czech Academy of Sciences; Nováková Geophysical Institute, Czechoslovak Academy of Sciences

Bohumila Bednářová (née Nováková; 7 February 1904 – 23 August 1985) was a Czech astronomer. She was the first Czech woman to become professionally involved in astronomy.

== Early life ==
Bednářová was born on 7 February 1904 in Přistoupim, Bohemia, Austria-Hungary. She attended secondary school in Jičín, then studied at the Faculty of Natural Sciences of the Charles University in Prague, graduating in 1926.

== Career ==
After graduating, Bednářová completed a period of study under Giorgio Abetti at the Arcetri Observatory in Florence, Italy. She was the first Czech woman to become professionally involved in astronomy. Bednářová was among the founders of the Prague Observatory on Petřín Hill, Prague, built in 1927–1928 by the Czech Astronomical Society. She became Head of the Czech Astronomical Society's Solar Section.

In 1935, Bednářová attended the 5th International Astronomical Union (IAU) congress in Paris, France, where she was elected as a full member of the organisation. She was also a member of Società Astronomica Italiana (SAIt), Société astronomique de France (SAF) and the Royal Astronomical Society of the United Kingdom.

In September 1936, Bednářová was posted to the Astrophysical Observatory at Hurbanovo. At the outbreak of World War II, she returned from Hurbanovo to Prague. Working at the Astronomical Institute of the Czech Academy of Sciences in Ondřejov, she enabled the installation of a spectrohelioscope at the Ondřejov Observatory, based on the instructions of George Ellery Hale.

In 1940, an order was issued dismissing all married women from the civil service, and, as she was married by this time, Bednářová was forced to abandon her scientific work and end her membership of international astronomical organisations. She was unable to work professionally again until 1952, when she joined the Nováková Geophysical Institute of the Czechoslovak Academy of Sciences. Here, Bednářová researched the effects of solar activity on the geomagnetic field, including the solar causes of geomagnetic storms. Her research enabled a new coronal model for predicting geomagnetic activity to be formulated.

== Death ==
Bednářová died on 23 August 1985 in Prague, Czechoslovakia, aged 81.
