= Ondřejov =

Ondřejov may refer to places in the Czech Republic:

- Ondřejov (Pelhřimov District), a municipality and village in the Vysočina Region
- Ondřejov (Prague-East District), a municipality and village in the Central Bohemian Region
  - Ondřejov Observatory, an observatory in the municipality
- Ondřejov, a village and part of Perštejn in the Ústí nad Labem Region
- Ondřejov, a village and part of Pláně in the Plzeň Region
- Ondřejov, a village and part of Rýmařov in the Moravian-Silesian Region
