= 7204 Ondřejov =

Main-belt asteroid

Discovery
- Discovered by: P. Pravec
- Discovery site: Ondřejov Obs.
- Discovery date: 3 April 1995

Designations
- Named after: Ondřejov (town and observatory)
- Alternative designations: 1995 GH · 1980 WM_{3}
- Minor planet category: main-belt · (middle)

Orbital characteristics
- Epoch 4 September 2017 (JD 2458000.5)
- Uncertainty parameter 0
- Observation arc: 36.42 yr (13,303 days)
- Aphelion: 2.9941 AU
- Perihelion: 2.3461 AU
- Semi-major axis: 2.6701 AU
- Eccentricity: 0.1213
- Orbital period (sidereal): 4.36 yr (1,594 days)
- Mean anomaly: 168.03°
- Mean motion: 0° 13^{m} 33.24^{s} / day
- Inclination: 4.8597°
- Longitude of ascending node: 172.33°
- Argument of perihelion: 235.90°

Physical characteristics
- Dimensions: 5.685±0.163 km 6.25 km (calculated)
- Synodic rotation period: 5.2334±0.0101 h
- Geometric albedo: 0.10 (assumed); 0.181±0.009
- Spectral type: S
- Absolute magnitude (H): 13.8 · 13.7 · 13.687±0.005 (R) · 13.67±0.19 · 14.14

7204 Ondřejov, provisional designation 1995 GH, is a stony asteroid from the middle region of the asteroid belt, approximately 6 kilometers in diameter. It was discovered on 3 April 1995, by Czech astronomer Petr Pravec at Ondřejov Observatory near Prague, Czech Republic.

This asteroid was the observatory's first numbered minor planet discovery. It was named for the Czech village of Ondřejov and its discovering observatory.

== Orbit and classification ==
Ondřejov orbits the Sun in the central main-belt at a distance of 2.3–3.0 AU once every 4 years and 4 months (1,594 days). Its orbit has an eccentricity of 0.12 and an inclination of 5° with respect to the ecliptic. It was first identified as 1980 WM_{3} at Palomar Observatory in 1980, extending the body's observation arc by 15 years prior to its official discovery observation at Ondrejov.

== Physical characteristics ==
=== Rotation period ===
In December 2011, a rotational lightcurve of Ondřejov was obtained from photometric observations taken at the Palomar Transient Factory in California. It showed a rotation period of 5.2334 hours with a brightness variation of 0.55 magnitude (U=2).

=== Diameter and albedo ===
According to the survey carried out by the NEOWISE mission of NASA's Wide-field Infrared Survey Explorer, the asteroid measures 5.9 kilometers in diameter and its surface has an albedo of 0.18, while the Collaborative Asteroid Lightcurve Link assumes a lower albedo of 0.10 and calculates a diameter of 6.3 kilometers with an absolute magnitude of 14.14.

== Naming ==
This minor planet was named for both, the Czech village of Ondřejov, and its discovering Ondřejov Observatory, founded in 1898.

Ondřejov is the Czech Republic's oldest astronomical observatory still in use. In 1953, the observatory was integrated into the Astronomical Institute and is now also owned by the Academy of Sciences of the Czech Republic. Ondřejov is located about 35 kilometers southeast of the country's capital, Prague. The approved naming citation was published by the Minor Planet Center on 22 February 1997 (M.P.C. 29149).
