= Astronomical Institute of Slovak Academy of Sciences =

Facility in Kežmarok, Slovakia

Coordinates: 49°09′08″N 20°17′17″E

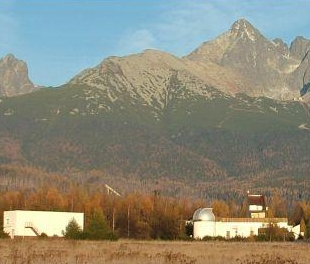
Headquarters of the astronomical institute.

The Astronomical Institute of Slovak Academy of Sciences was founded in 1953, when the state observatory on Skalnaté Pleso (founded in 1943 by Dr. Bečvář) got a status of astronomical institute and became one of the founding institutes of the newly born Slovakian Academy of Sciences. In memories of past and current employees, the institute and the observatory on Skalnaté Pleso were always blended in one and therefore one could consider for the year of the institute foundation already the 1943. Currently, it has its headquarters at Tatranská Lomnica.

== Field of research and organization of the institute ==
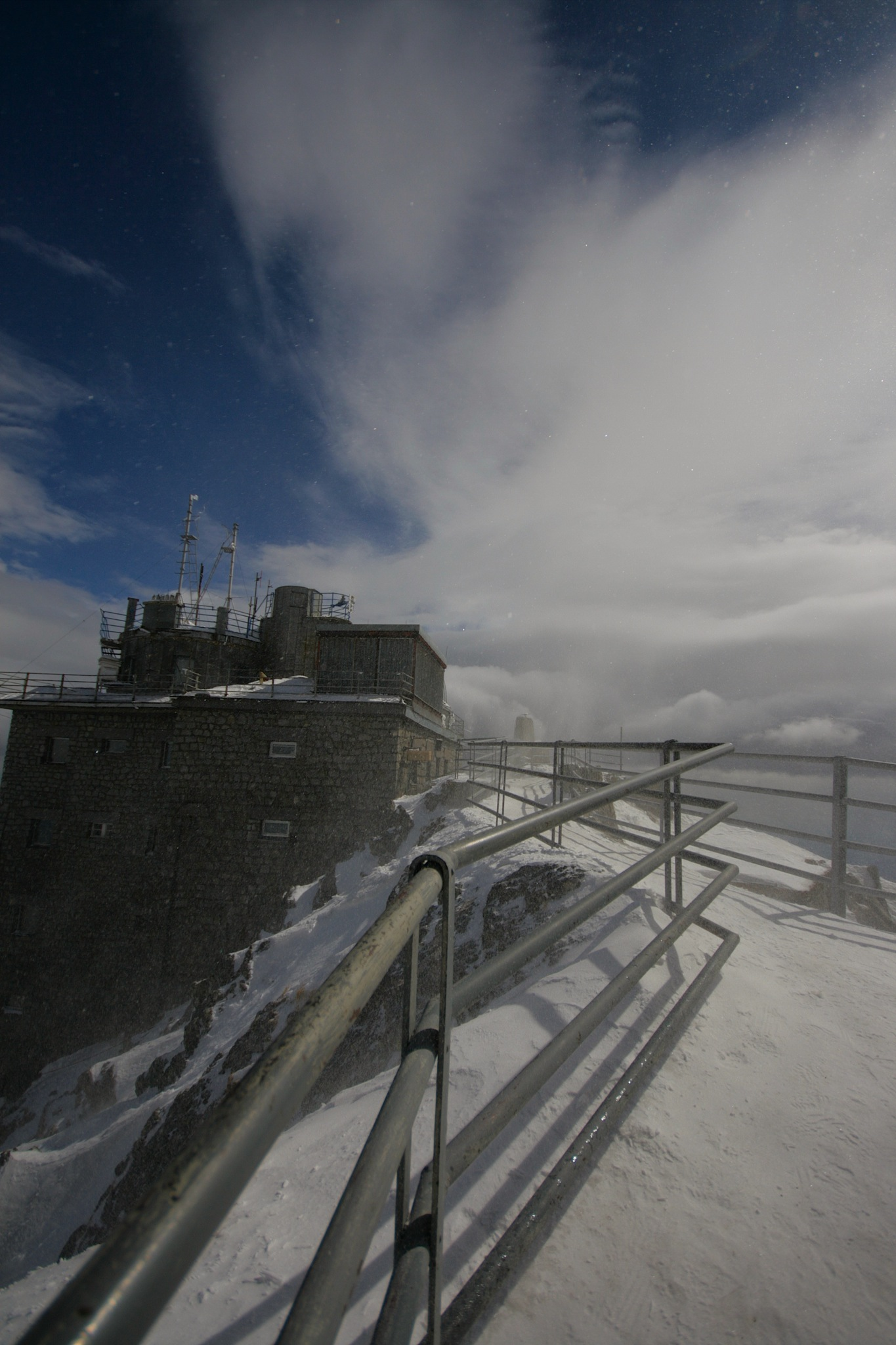
Astronomical and meteorological station on the Lomnický štít (working since 1960), which is the third highest summit of Slovakia.

The institute focuses its research on the Sun, interplanetary matter (comets, meteoroids, asteroids) and on astrophysical research of variable and chemically peculiar stars. It has about 65 permanent employees of which roughly 50 are active researchers. It is divided into 3 departments:

=== Department of Solar Physics ===
Interest in solar atmospheric activity led the department to focus on many processes in the solar photosphere, chromosphere and corona based on spectral line analysis using observational data from the Vacuum Tower Telescope (VTT) on Tenerife and utilization of data from Solar and Heliospheric Observatory (SOHO), including their own coronal observations. The head of the department is Aleš Kučera.

=== Department of Interplanetary Matter ===
Research employs photometry and astrometry of asteroids and comets using the main telescope of Skalnaté Pleso observatory. Furthermore, fish-eye cameras are used to detect bolides on the sky. The head of the department is Ján Svoreň.

=== Stellar Physics Department ===
This department is focused on binary and multiple stellar systems. Its research employs spectroscopy and utilization of synthetic spectra and stellar databases from space-based observatories like HST, Hipparcos and the TYCHO catalogues. The head of the department is Drahomír Chochol.

=== Facilities of the Institute ===
The institute has mountain observatories at Skalnaté Pleso, Lomnický štít and a theoretical department in Bratislava (founded in 1955), which is a statewide coordinating body for research of interplanetary matter. Moreover, it runs several full-sky photographic chambers (bolide cameras) which are part of European bolide network.

The astronomical observatory at Skalnaté Pleso (1783 m) was founded in 1943. It is equipped with a 61 cm astrometrical and photometric reflector with a CCD camera and a 60 cm photometric reflector. The astronomical station on Lomnický štít (2632 m) has been active since 1960. It is equipped with a 20 cm coronograph and a spectrograph. In the headquarters of the astronomical institute at Tatranská Lomnica a 60 cm reflector and a solar horizontal spectrograph are located.

== Directors of the institute ==
- Antonín Bečvář (1943–1950)
- V. Guth (1951–1956)
- Záviš Bochníček (1956–1958)
- Ľudmila Pajdušáková (1958–1979)
- Július Sýkora (1979–1989)
- Ján Štohl (1989–1993)
- Juraj Zverko (1993–2001)
- Ján Svoreň (2001–2009)
- Aleš Kučera (2009–)

== Highlights of the institute ==
The astronomical institute participated on discoveries of the following comets:

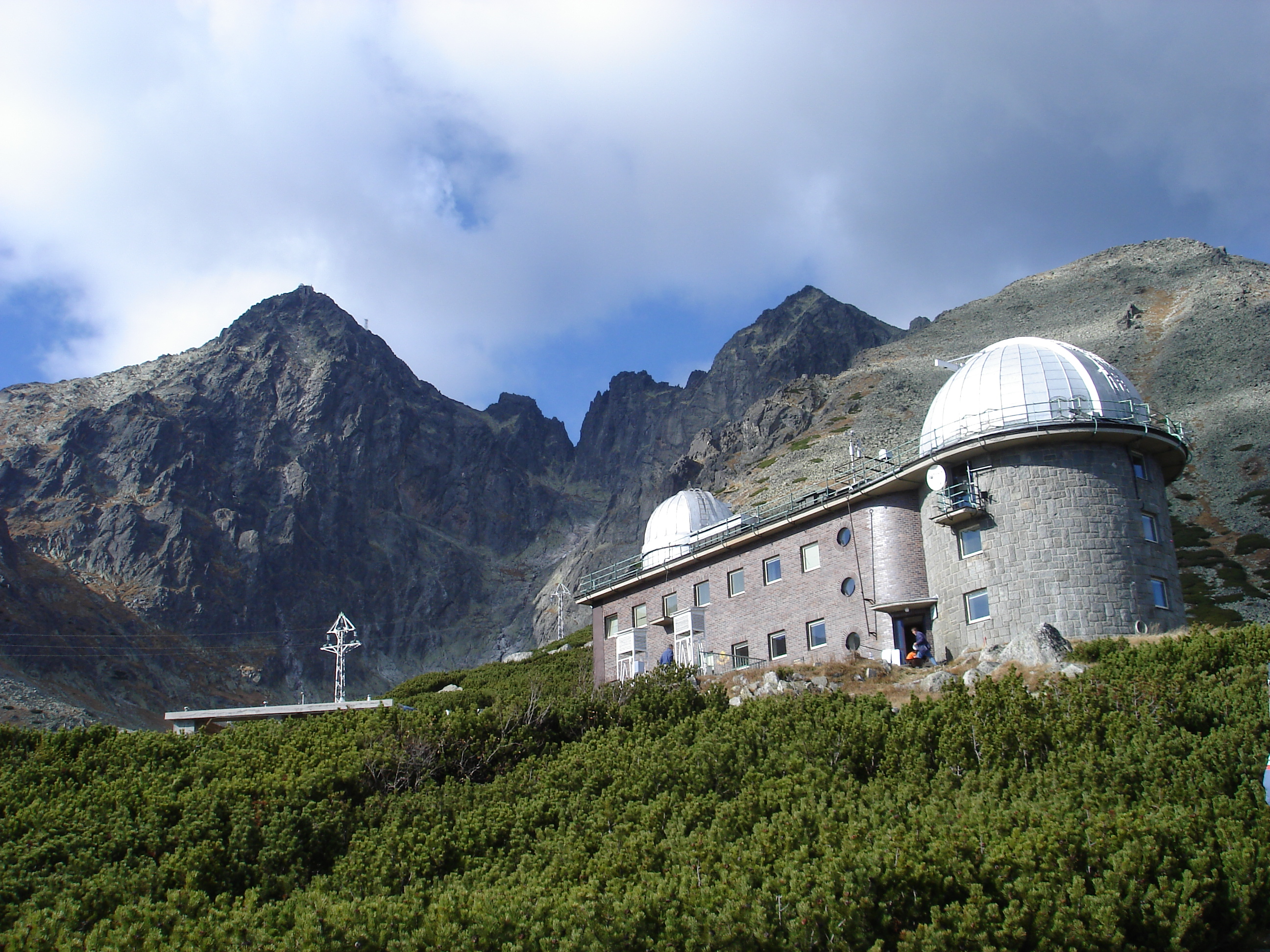

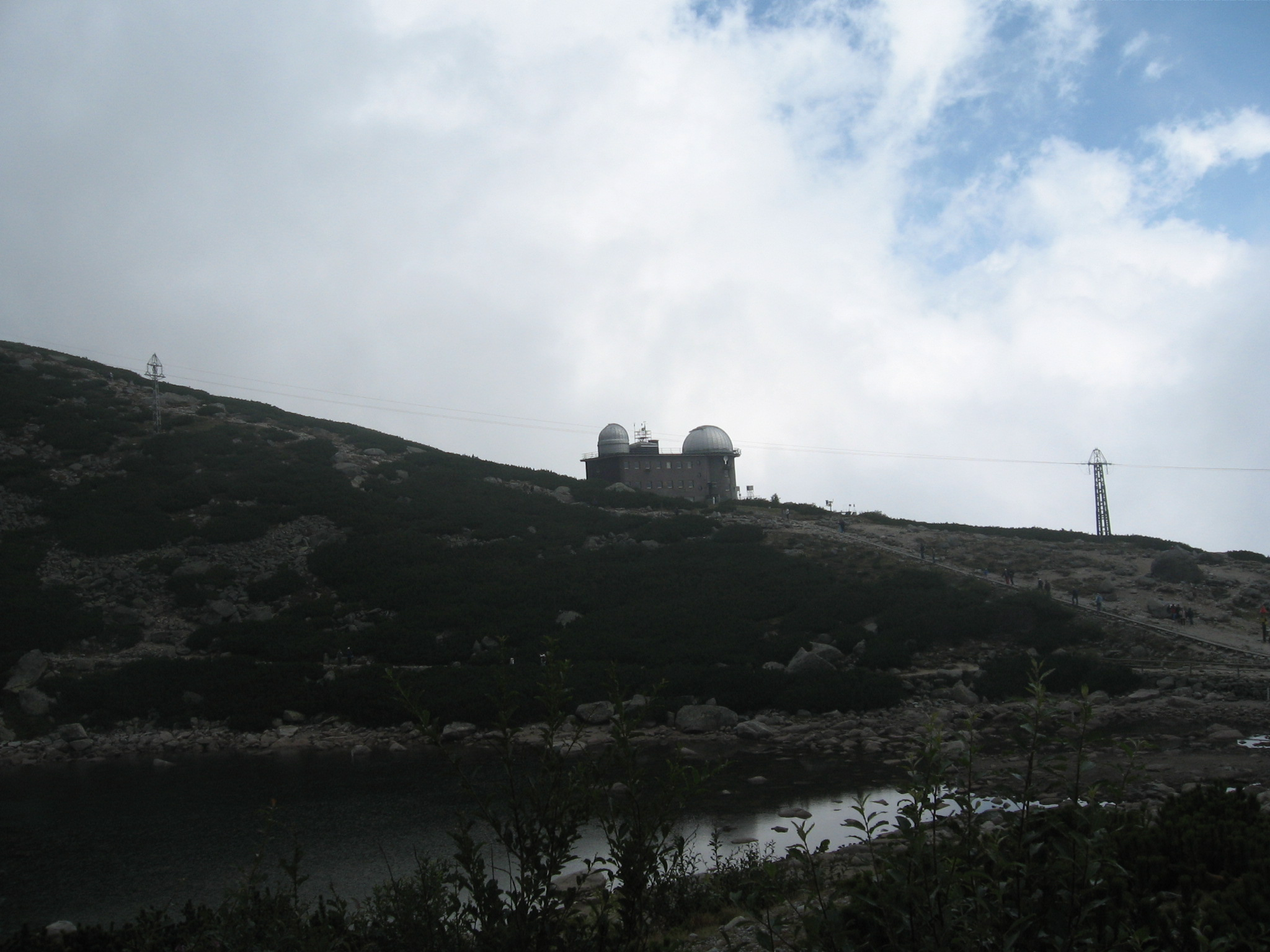

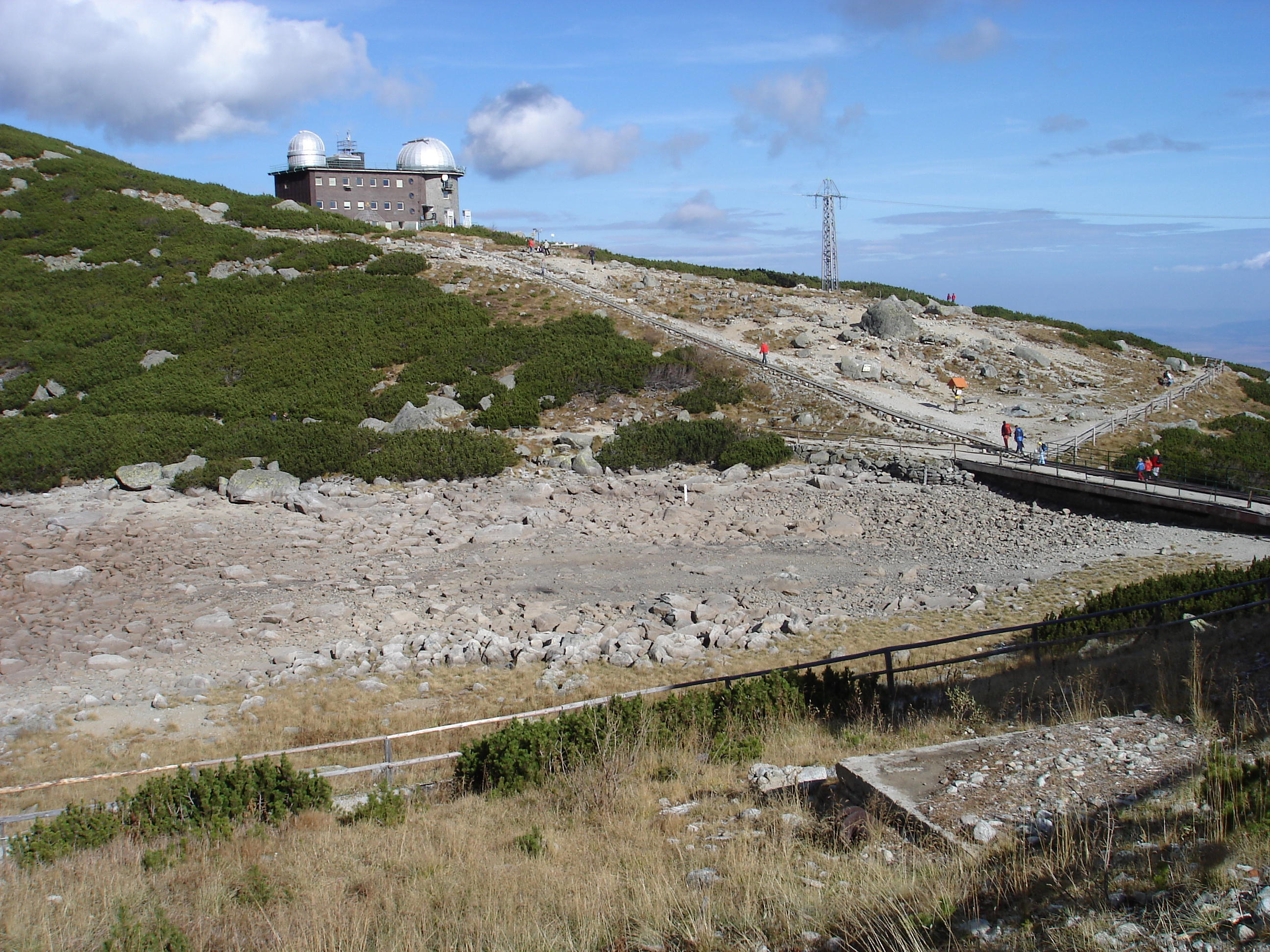
Observatory on the Skalnaté Pleso (founded in 1943).

Name	Label	Date of the discovery	Brightness at the discovery (mag)
Pajdušáková-Rotbar-Weber	C/1946 K1	30. 05. 1946	7
Bečvář	C/1947 F2	27. 03. 1947	9
Mrkos	C/1947 Y1	20. 12. 1947	9,5
Pajdušáková-Mrkos	C/1948 E1	15. 02. 1948	10
P/Honda-Mrkos-Pajdušáková	45P	03. 12. 1948	9
Pajdušáková	C/1951 C1	04. 02. 1951	8,5
P/Tuttle-Giacobini-Kresák	41P	24. 04. 1951	10,5
Mrkos	C/1952 H1	27. 04. 1952	10
Mrkos	C/1952 W1	28. 11. 1952	10
Mrkos-Honda	C/1953 G1	12. 04. 1953	9
Pajdušáková	C/1953 X1	03. 12. 1953	11
Vozárová	C/1954 O1	28. 07. 1954	9
Kresák-Peltier	C/1954 M2	26. 06. 1954	10
Mrkos	C/1955 L1	12. 06. 1955	3,5
P/Perrine-Mrkos	18D	19. 10. 1955	9
Mrkos	C/1956 E1	12. 03. 1956	9
Mrkos	C/1957 P1	29. 07. 1957	3
Mrkos	C/1959 X1	03. 12. 1959	8

Five astronomers participated in the discoveries: Antonín Mrkos, Ľudmila Pajdušáková, Ľubor Kresák, Antonín Bečvář and Margita Kresáková. From 70 comets discovered worldwide between 1946 and 1959, 18 were discovered from the observatories at Skalnaté Pleso and Lomnický štít.

== See also ==
- Astronomical Institute of Czech Academy of Sciences
- Ondřejov Observatory
- Institute of physics of the University of Pavol Jozef Šafárik
