= Přistoupim =

- Municipality
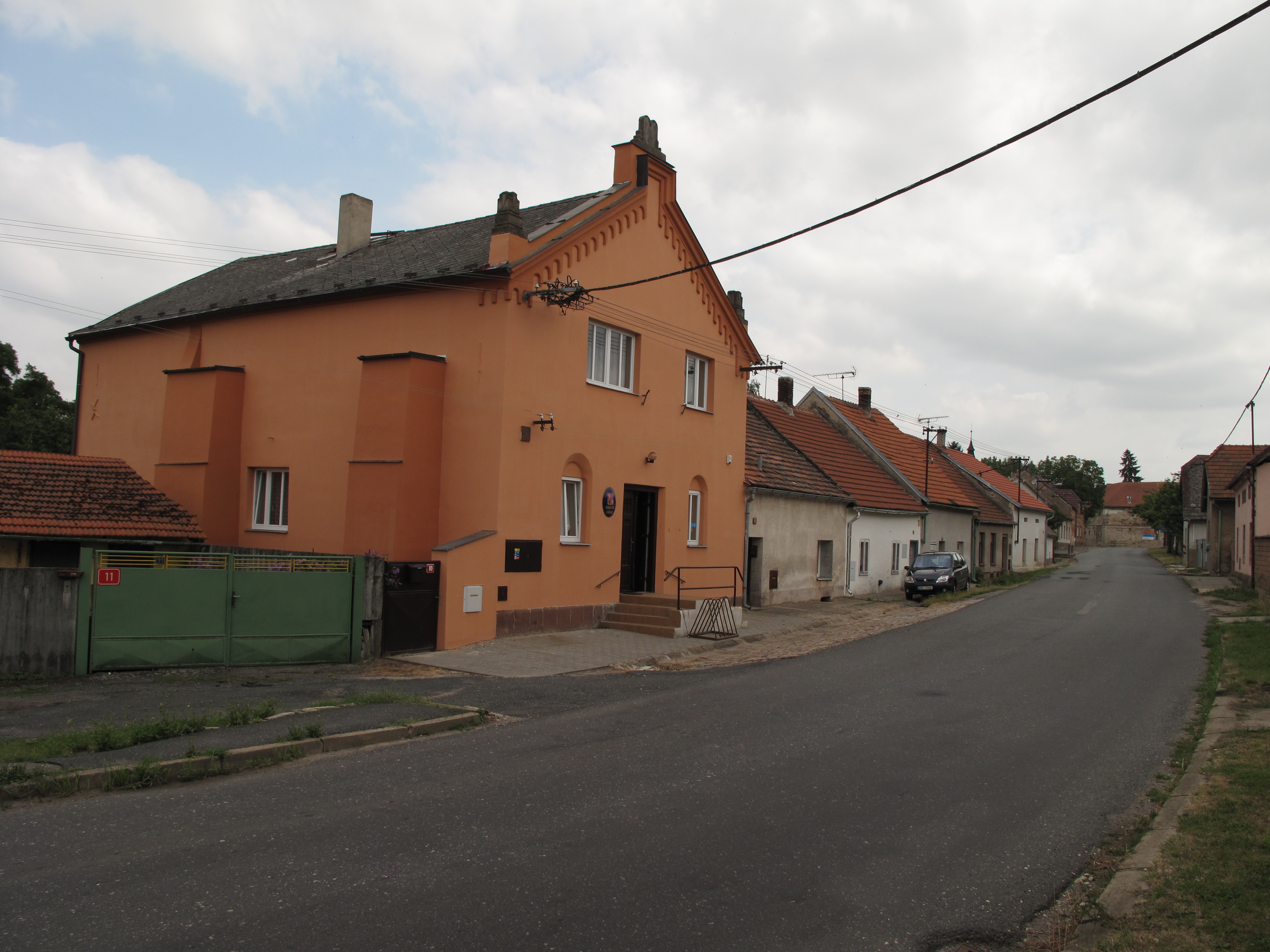
- Former synagogue, now municipal office

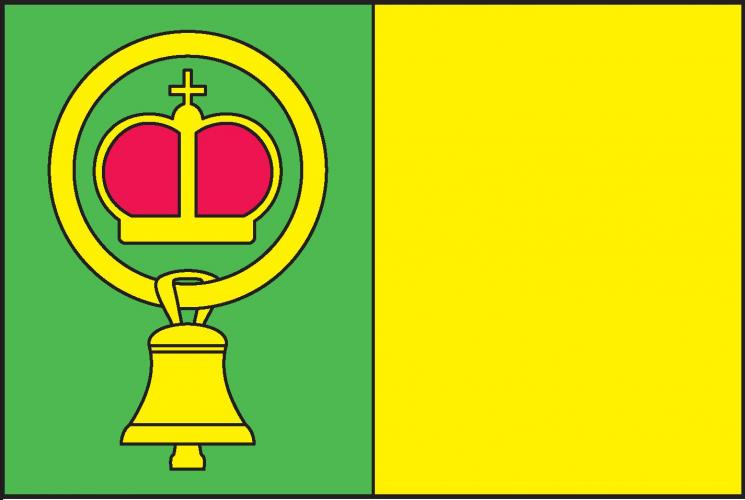
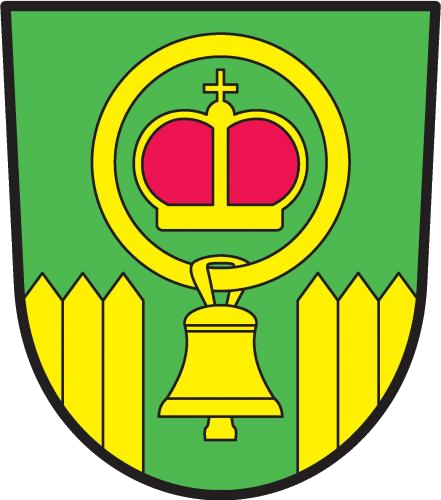
- Flag Coat of arms

- Location in the Czech Republic
- Coordinates: 50°3′15″N 14°52′43″E
- Country: Czech Republic
- Region: Central Bohemian
- District: Kolín
- First mentioned: 1148

Area
  - Total: 4.43 km^{2} (1.71 sq mi)
- Elevation: 224 m (735 ft)

Population (2026-01-01)
  - Total: 471
  - Density: 106/km^{2} (275/sq mi)
- Time zone: UTC+1 (CET)
  - Summer (DST): UTC+2 (CEST)
- Postal code: 282 01
- Website: www.pristoupim.cz

Přistoupim is a municipality and village in Kolín District in the Central Bohemian Region of the Czech Republic. It has about 500 inhabitants.

== History ==
The first written mention of Přistoupim is in a document that originated between 1140 and 1148.

== Demographics ==
Historical population
| Year | Pop. | ±% |
|---|---|---|
| 1869 | 549 | — |
| 1880 | 591 | +7.7% |
| 1890 | 705 | +19.3% |
| 1900 | 659 | −6.5% |
| 1910 | 686 | +4.1% |
| 1921 | 671 | −2.2% |
| 1930 | 682 | +1.6% |
| 1950 | 565 | −17.2% |
| 1961 | 542 | −4.1% |
| 1970 | 499 | −7.9% |
| 1980 | 471 | −5.6% |
| 1991 | 378 | −19.7% |
| 2001 | 383 | +1.3% |
| 2011 | 434 | +13.3% |
| 2021 | 451 | +3.9% |
Source: Censuses

== Notable people ==
- Bohumila Bednářová (1904–1985), astronomer
