= Václav Láska (mathematician) =

Czech geodesist, astronomer, geophysicist and mathematician

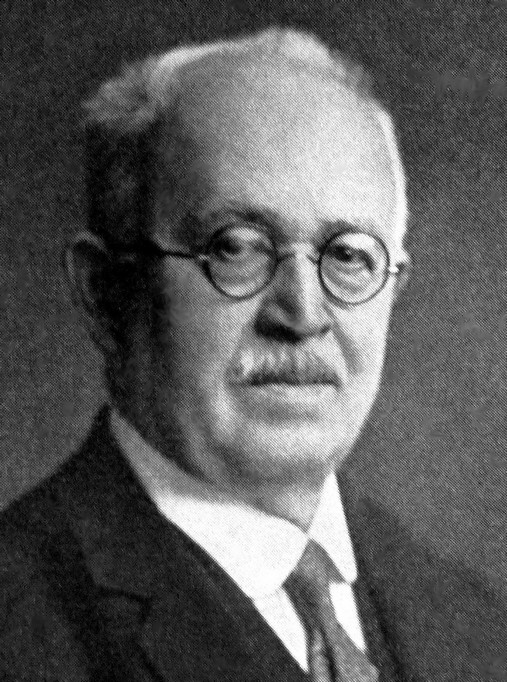
Láska in 1932

Václav Jan Láska (24 August 1862 – 27 July 1943) was a Czech geodesist, astronomer, geophysicist and mathematician. He was based mainly at Charles University, and was the founding director (1920–1933) of the State Institute of Geophysics, which later became the Institute of Geophysics of the Czech Academy of Sciences.

== Life ==
Láska was born on 24 August 1862 in Prague. He graduated from the Faculty of Arts, Charles University in Prague (that time called Charles-Ferdinand University). After his studies, he worked as an astronomer at the Clementinum observatory, but left due to the low salary and began to study geodesy. He graduated from geodesy at the Czech Technical University in Prague in 1890 and remained at the university as a professor of cartography, higher geodesy and photogrammetry. By 1895, he was offered the position of professor of higher geodesy and astronomy at the University of Lviv, which he accepted. Here he established contacts with a number of foreign notable scientists who gathered in his house. During this period, he primarily devoted himself to seismology and was cited in many textbooks on geophysics and earthquake science.

He returned to Prague in 1911 and became professor of Applied Mathematics at the Faculty of Arts, Charles University. He died on 27 July 1943 in Řevnice. He is buried at the Olšany Cemetery in Prague.

== Láska's empirical rule ==
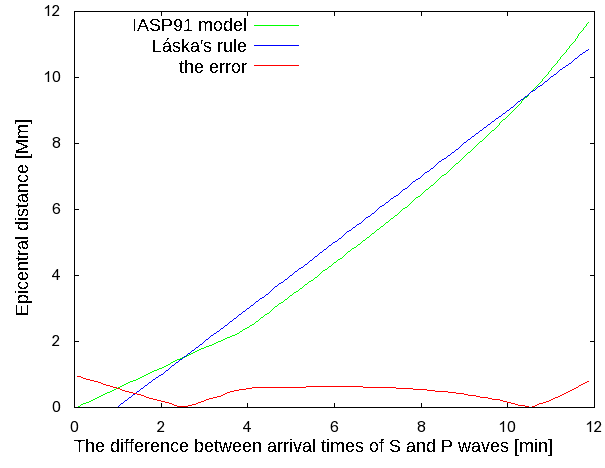
The error of Láska's empirical rule

This empirical rule is one way how to approximate the distance from an earthquake's epicenter. The rule is most fitting for distance in the range of 2−10 Mm (thousand km). The epicentral distance in thousands of km is roughly equal to the difference between arrival times of S and P waves in minutes minus 1.
