= Astronomical Institute of the Czech Academy of Sciences =

Scientific institute in the Czech Republic

- Director: Michal Bursa
- Address: Fričova 298, 251 65; Ondřejov, Czech Republic
- Coordinates: 49°54′32.98″N 14°46′54.8″E
- Interactive map of Astronomical Institute of the Czech Academy of Sciences
- Website: https://www.asu.cas.cz/en/

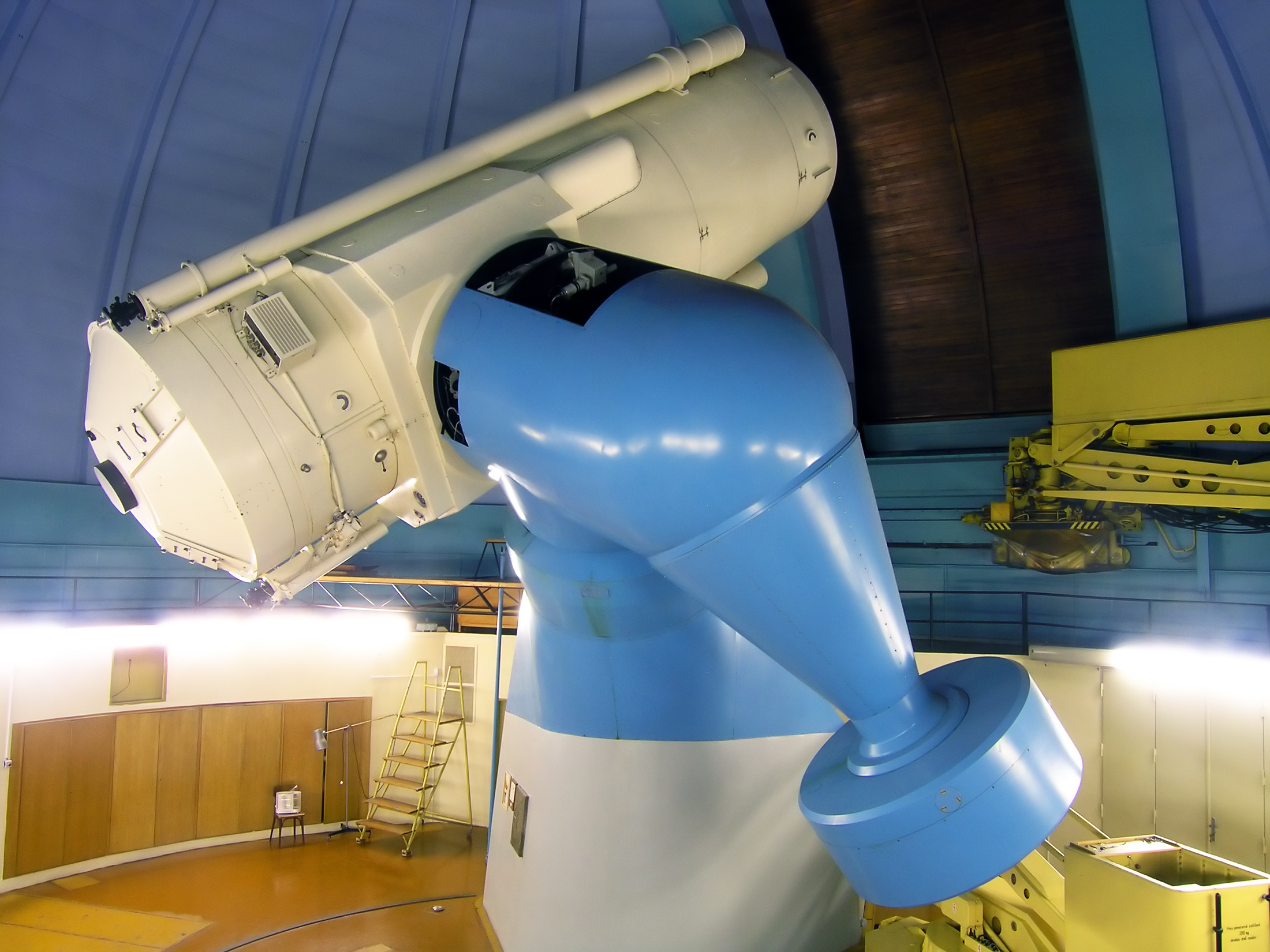
Two-meter telescope

The Astronomical Institute of the Czech Academy of Sciences (Czech: Astronomický ústav Akademie věd České republiky) is a scientific institute headquartered at the Ondřejov Observatory, roughly 35 km southeast of Prague, Czech Republic.

== Research fields ==
The institute focuses on stellar, solar and galactic astronomy; meteors; and the motion of cosmic bodies. It has about 70 permanent scientists, of which roughly 80% work in Ondřejov, and it is divided into the following departments.

=== Solar physics ===
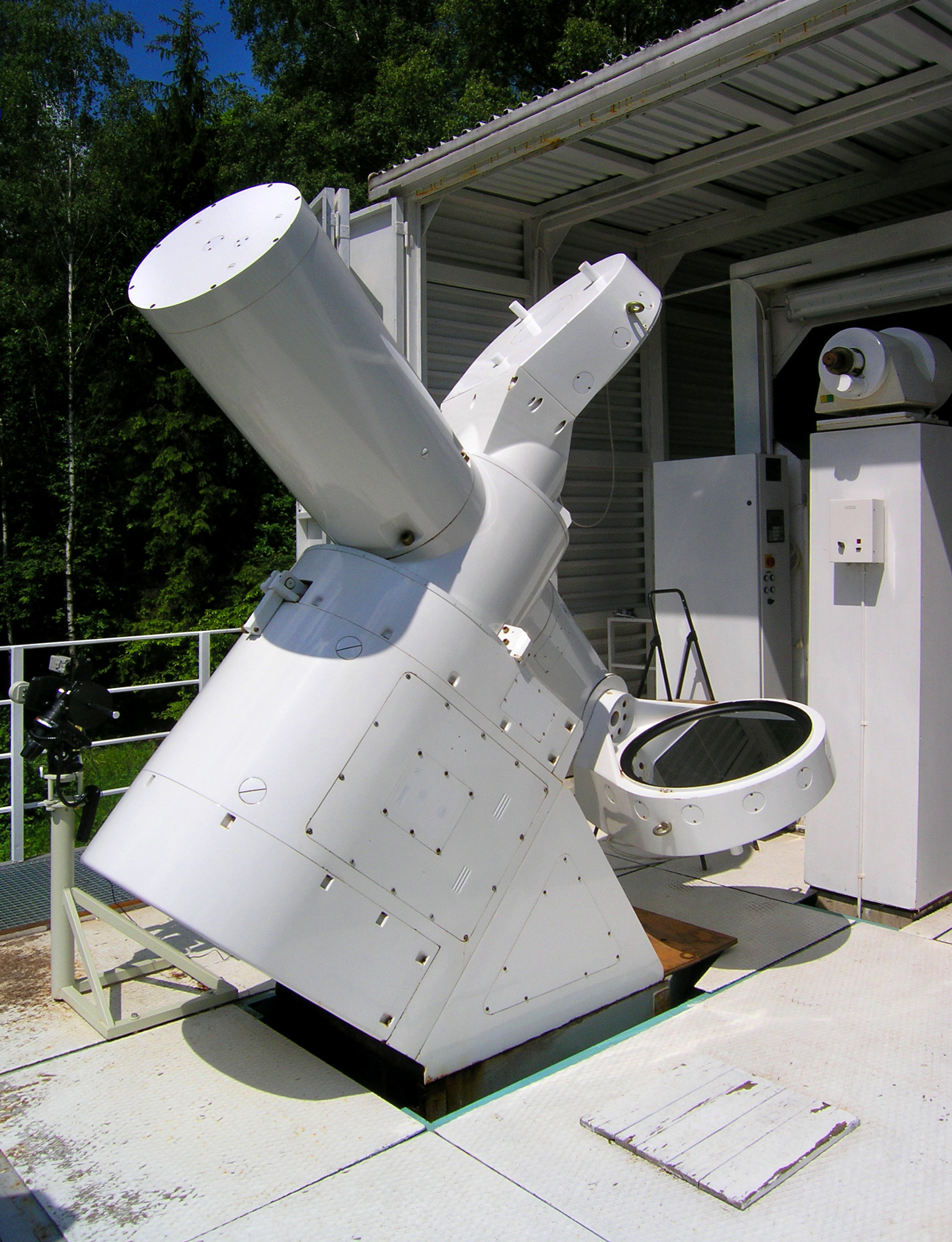
Solar spectrograph

The solar physics department studies the active phenomena in the solar atmosphere, including flares, active regions, sunspots, filaments, coronal mass ejections, and solar wind, using optical, radio, and X-ray waveband observations.

=== Stellar physics ===
The stellar physics department is focused on research of stars, primarily hot stars (class B), models of stellar atmospheres, dynamics of stellar winds, and relativistic astrophysics. This department uses the largest telescope in the Czech Republic, which has a large reflector with a two-meter wide mirror. The head of the department is Jiří Kubát.

The department also conducts research under the leadership of René Hudec on gamma and roentgen radiation in the universe by observing gamma bursts and blazars.

=== Interplanetary matter ===
The interplanetary matter department primarily researches meteors, comets, and asteroids are the main research targets of this department. The meteors are observed by optical telescopes and meteoric radar. The department uses a 65-centimeter optical telescope to do photometric observations of asteroids. The head of the department is Pavel Spurný.

=== Galaxies and planetary systems ===
This department is located in Prague and primarily researches the effects of the Solar System on Earth. The head of the department is Jan Palouš.

The galaxies and planetary systems department includes the Group of Dynamics of Space Satellites, which focuses on theoretical and practical studies of space satellite motion. This team's main research project was the micro-accelerometer, Macek, for measurements of accelerations of non-gravitational origin. Macek was released in 1996 on the Space Shuttle Atlantis (mission STS-79) and in 2003 on the Czech satellite MIMOSA.

== History ==
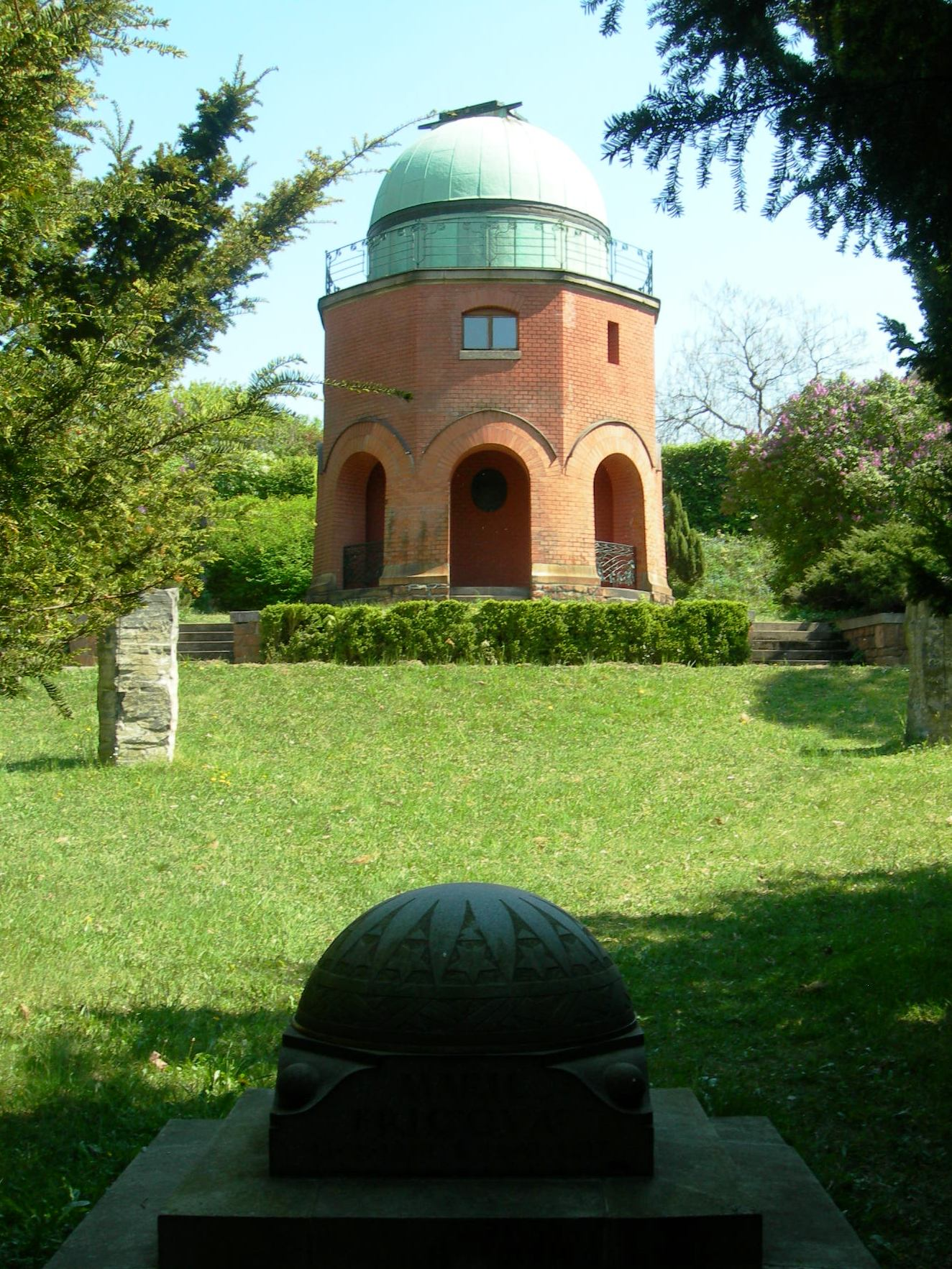
Historical dome of the Ondřejov Observatory

The Astronomical Institute originated as an observatory founded at the beginning of the 18th century by Jesuits College in Prague. After World War I, the observatory was renamed the "State Astronomical Observatory." In 1940, it was moved to an undistinguished apartment building in Prague. In 1898, Josef Jan Frič was building another private observatory in Ondřejov. He donated this small observatory to the state of Czechoslovakia in 1928. After the establishment of the Czechoslovak Academy of Sciences, this observatory was merged with the State Astronomical Observatory to create the current Astronomical Institute.

== See also ==
- Astronomical Institute of Slovak Academy of Sciences
- Department of theoretical physics and astrophysics of Masaryk University
- Institute of physics of the University of Pavol Jozef Šafárik
- List of astronomical observatories
