= Institute of Geophysics of the Czech Academy of Sciences =

Czech scientific research institution

Institute of Geophysics
- Geofyzikální ústav (in Czech)
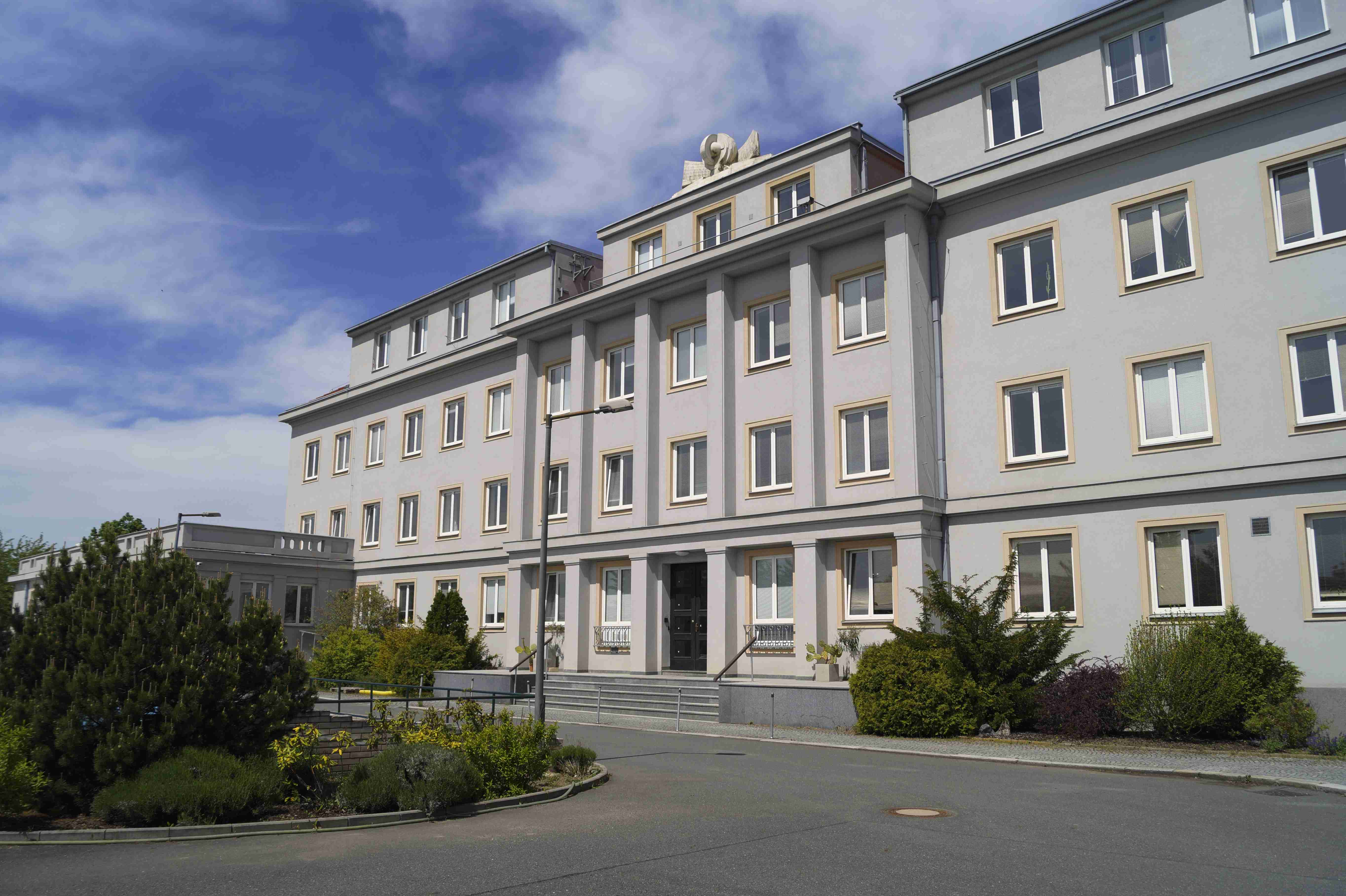
- Spořilov campus, Prague.
- Founded: 1920 (as the State Institute of Geophysics)
- Type: Public research institution
- Purpose: Pure and applied research in the Earth sciences
- Headquarters: Prague, Czech Republic
- Affiliations: Czech Academy of Sciences
- Website: www.ig.cas.cz/en

The Institute of Geophysics, GFÚ (Czech: Geofyzikální ústav), is a publicly funded scientific research institution in Prague affiliated with the Czech Academy of Sciences (Czech: Akademie věd České republiky, AV ČR). It focuses on pure and applied research in the Earth and environmental sciences.

== History ==
The Institute of Geophysics of the Czech Academy of Sciences is rooted in the (State) Institute of Geophysics established in 1920, also the precursor of two other centres of geophysics, both at the Charles University: the Department of Geophysics in the Faculty of Mathematics and Physics, and Applied Geophysics within the Faculty of Science. In the early years of the first Czechoslovak Republic, the Institute of Geophysics was launched by one of the founders of modern seismology, Václav Láska, who served as founding director (1920–1933). A key early achievement was the commissioning of a Wiechert horizontal seismograph in 1924, part of the emerging global network of seismic stations at the time.

During the Second World War and under the Communist regime from 1948, the institute was subsumed into other institutions before once again becoming independent within the newly created national Academy of Sciences. The Institute of Geophysics of the Czechoslovak Academy of Sciences was inaugurated on 1 January 1953.

=== Directors of the Institute of Geophysics ===
- Aleš Špičák (2017–present)
- Pavel Hejda (2007–2017)
- Aleš Špičák (1998–2007)
- Vladimír Čermák (1990–1998)
- Václav Bucha (1969–1990)
- Miloš Pick (1960–1969)
- Jan Bouška (1957–1960)
- Bedřich Šalamon (1933–1952)
- Václav Láska (1920–1933)

== Staff ==
Aleš Špičák has served as institute director since 2017. As of 2022, the institute employs a total of 104 staff, including 76 scientists, 11 doctoral candidates, and 28 technical and administrative staff. Since 2018, the institute has recruited a number of international scientists to senior researcher positions.

== Research fields ==
Research activities span a broad range of field-based, modelling and theoretical approaches in the Earth sciences, including active plate tectonic processes, the dynamics of orogeny, rock deformation, environmental magnetism, the geomagnetic field and geodynamo, local seismicity studies, sedimentary basins, seismic wave and source studies, the structure of continental lithosphere, geomorphology, palaeoclimatology, and volcanic and magmatic processes.

The institute maintains several long-term Earth observation facilities, including the National Geomagnetic Observatory Budkov, four Earth tides observatories, and the Czech regional seismic network. In addition, the institute operates two local seismic networks (WEBNET and REYKJANET) and a pool of mobile seismic stations (MOBNET), which is deployed temporarily in tectonically active regions.

== Impact ==
The Institute of Geophysics is among the leading centres of Earth science research in the Czech Republic. Its scientists have made several key contributions to the field of geophysics, including:

- the first comprehensive catalogue of earthquakes in Europe by V. Kárník
- development of the first broadband seismometer by A. Plešinger and J. Horálek
- advancement of ray methods in seismology by the group led by V. Červený (Charles University), including I. Pšenčík (GFÚ)
- standardisation of earthquake magnitude determination by J. Vaněk (in collaboration with L. Christoskov and N.V. Kondorskaya)
- the first map of terrestrial heat flow in Europe by V. Čermák (in collaboration with L. Rybach)
- pioneering work on seismic anisotropy by V. Babuška and J. Plomerová (in collaboration with M. Cara).
- the 'castle meetings', a series of thematic gatherings held in Czechoslovakia (and later the Czech Republic) that brought together scientists from the East and West
- a conference series convened by the International Heat Flow Commission, building on the 'castle meetings' and named in honour of V. Čermák

The institute is the seat of the Czech National Commission for Geodesy and Geophysics, affiliated with the International Union of Geodesy and Geophysics (IUGG). The 26th IUGG General Assembly was held in Prague in 2015.

Institute scientists participate in university education, teaching undergraduate courses and supervising master's and doctoral research. It regularly hosts science outreach events for young people and the general public, and informs Czech and international media organisations about important global geophysical events.

The institute established a scientific journal, Studia Geophysica et Geodaetica, in 1956, now distributed by Springer Nature.

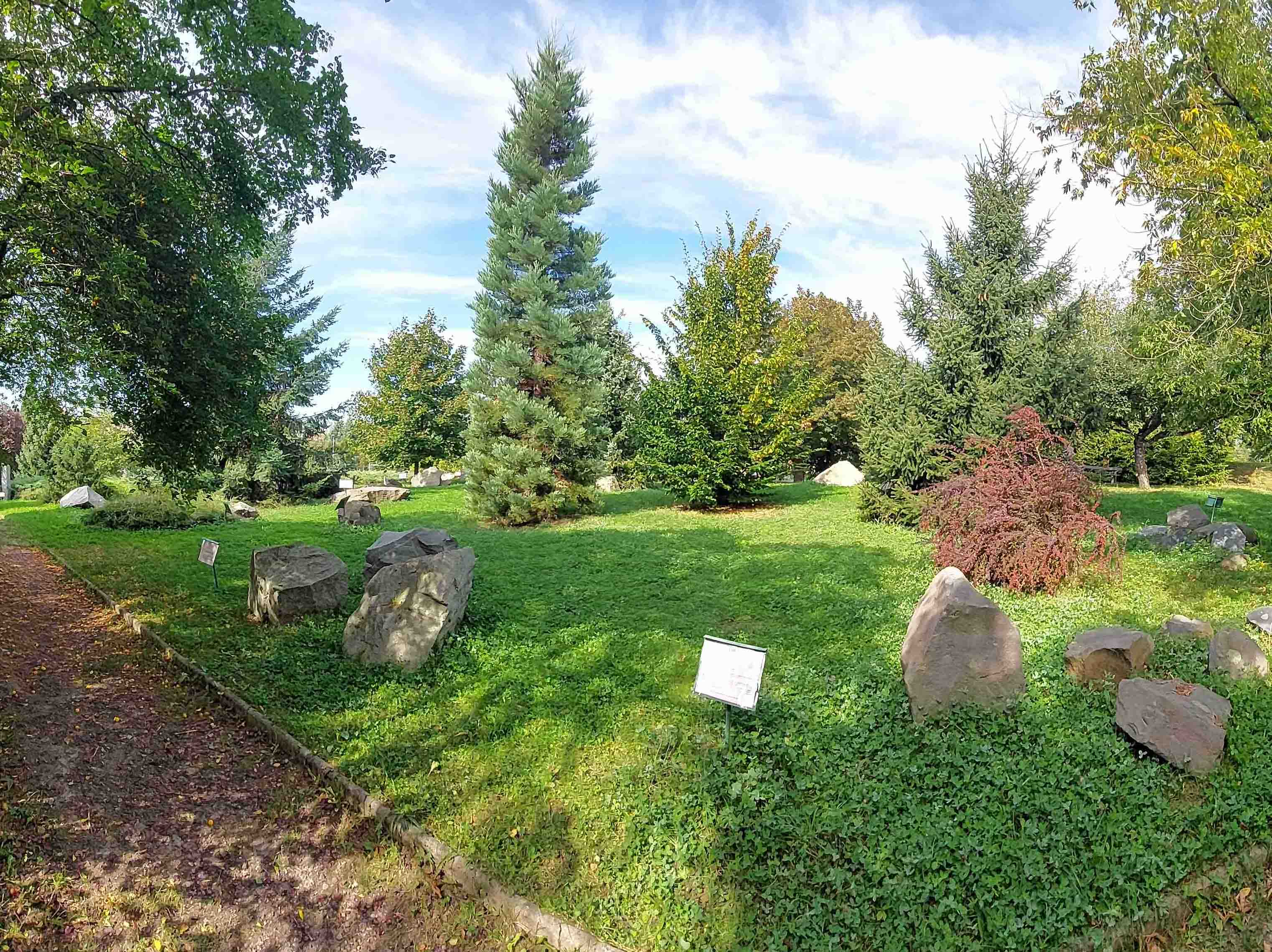
Spořilov Geopark, an educational display of rocks at the institute.
