= Pláně =

- Municipality
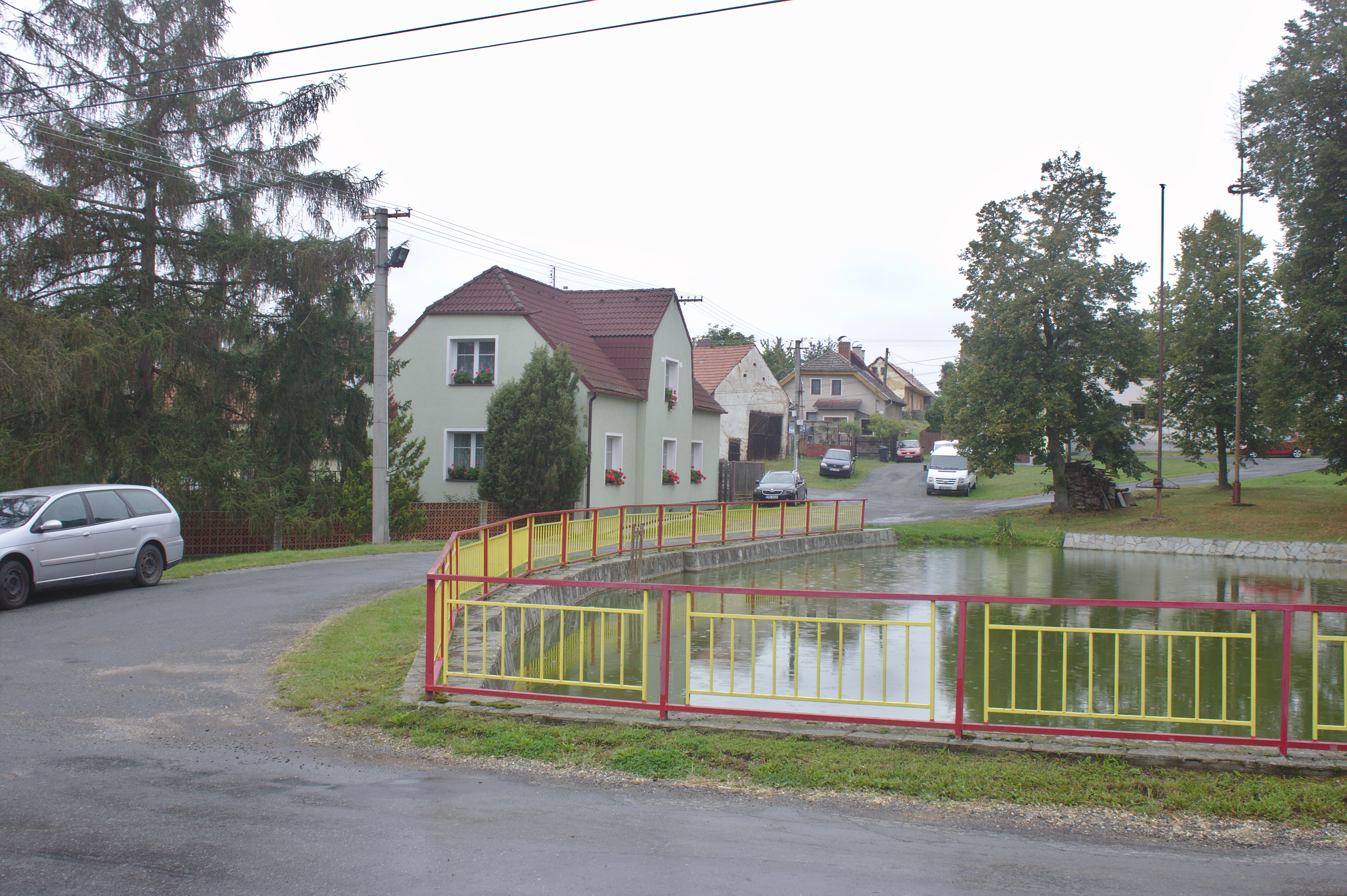
- Centre of Pláně

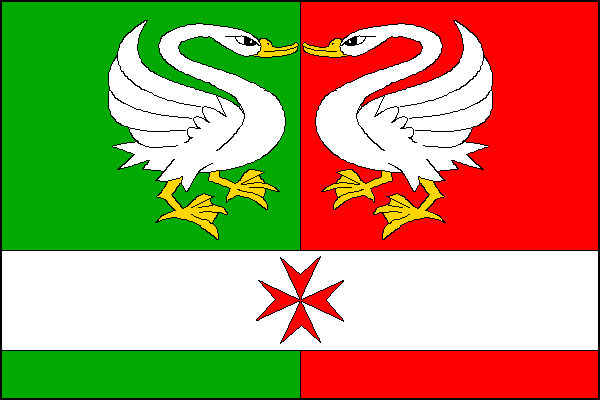
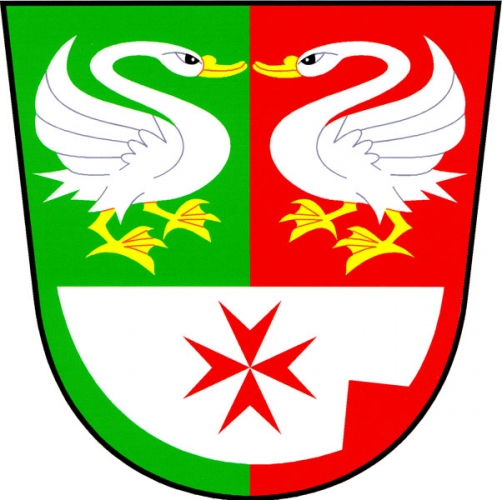
- Flag Coat of arms

- Location in the Czech Republic
- Coordinates: 49°57′1″N 13°18′30″E
- Country: Czech Republic
- Region: Plzeň
- District: Plzeň-North
- First mentioned: 1169

Area
  - Total: 13.92 km^{2} (5.37 sq mi)
- Elevation: 522 m (1,713 ft)

Population (2026-01-01)
  - Total: 282
  - Density: 20.3/km^{2} (52.5/sq mi)
- Time zone: UTC+1 (CET)
  - Summer (DST): UTC+2 (CEST)
- Postal code: 331 01
- Website: www.obec-plane.cz

Pláně is a municipality and village in Plzeň-North District in the Plzeň Region of the Czech Republic. It has about 300 inhabitants.

Pláně lies approximately 23 kilometres (14 mi) north of Plzeň and 82 km (51 mi) west of Prague.

== Administrative division ==
Pláně consists of four municipal parts (in brackets population according to the 2021 census):

- Pláně (125)
- Korýtka (18)
- Ondřejov (42)
- Vrážné (62)

== Demographics ==
Historical population
Year	Pop.	±%
1869	628	—
1880	606	−3.5%
1890	571	−5.8%
1900	591	+3.5%
1910	599	+1.4%
1921	612	+2.2%
1930	566	−7.5%
1950	360	−36.4%
1961	334	−7.2%
1970	295	−11.7%
1980	286	−3.1%
1991	255	−10.8%
2001	266	+4.3%
2011	236	−11.3%
2021	247	+4.7%
Source: Censuses
