= Institute of physics of the University of Pavol Jozef Šafárik =

Coordinates: 48°43′45″N 21°14′54″E

The institute of physics is a part of the Faculty of natural sciences of the Pavol Jozef Šafárik University in Košice in Slovakia. Its director is currently Michal Jaščur. Primary activities of the institute are:

- education of students trying to obtain a master's degree in physics or in any other subject in combination with physics.
- scientific research within areas of magnetism, physics of low temperatures, nuclear physics, biophysics, theoretical physics, astrophysics and theory of physics education.

== Departments ==
=== Department of Theoretical Physics and Astrophysics ===
The Department of Theoretical Physics and Astrophysics provides education within all basic disciplines of theoretical physics. Through series of mandatory science courses, it educates students for specialization either in physics of condensed matter, nuclear physics, computer physics or astrophysics.

The research at the department employs:

- theoretical study of magnetic properties of certain materials and phase transitions in magnetic systems
- development of mathematical tools in geophysics
- theory of elementary particles
- physical properties of interacting binaries (binary stars)

The research of the department involves collaboration with:

- Department of Solid State Physics, University of Lodz, Lodz, Poland
- Department of Applied Science, Kyushu University, Fukuoka, Japan
- Department of Natural Science Informatics, Nagoya University, Nagoya, Japan
- Gerhard Mercator Universität Duisburg, Duisburg, Germany
- Joint Institute of Nuclear Research, Dubna, Russia
- Department of Theoretical Physics, Uzhgorod State University, Uzhgorod, Ukraine
- University of Athens, Athens, Greece
- Institut d'Astrophysique, Paris, France
- Dipartimento di Scienze Fisiche, Universita di Napoli "Federico II", Napoli, Italy
- Astronomical institute of Czech academy of sciences, Czech Republic

=== Department of Biophysics ===
The scientific work of the department has an inter-disciplinary character. Our scientific interest is mainly focused on the investigation of new photosensitizers, which could be used for diagnostic and treatment of cancer diseases.

There is a collaboration of the department with numerous universities and research institutes in the world including both research (common projects) and pedagogical activities (few-months stages of our students abroad, and co-tutoring programs).

- International Laser Center, Bratislava, Slovak Republic
- Université P. et M. Curie, Paris, France
- Centre de Biophysique Moléculaire, Orleans, France
- Faculty of Mathematics and Physics, Charles University, Prague, Czech Rep.
- Instituto de Estructura de la Materia CSIC, Madrid, Spain
- Department of Chemistry, Iowa State University, Ames, USA
- Stockholms Universitet, Stockholm, Sweden
- Instituto de Ciencias Fotónicas, Barcelona, Spain
- Rice University, Houston, USA
- Universidad Metropolitana, San Juan, Puerto Rico, USA

=== Department of Physics of Condensed Matters ===
The personnel of the department is participating in the classwork of basic physics courses and also prepares specialized classes devoted to the magnetism, metal physics, low-temperature physics, physics of new advanced materials and experimental techniques. Research programs of our department are focused on magnetic and transport properties of different classes of materials - amorph, nano-structural, low-dimensional and molecular magnets in the temperature range from room temperature down to the lowest temperature of 30 mK.

The department carries out research in collaboration with:

- DESY Hamburg, Germany
- Instituto de Ciencia de Materiales, CSIC, Madrid, Spain
- Faculty of Physics and Mathematics, Charles University and Institute for Physics of Czech academy of sciences
- University of Florida, Gainesville, Florida, USA
- Research center Dresden-Rossendorf, Germany
- IFW Dresden, Germany
- Research center Julich, Germany
- Royal Holloway, University of London, Great Britain
- Institute of nuclear physics, Belehrad, Serbia
- Laboratory of strong magnetic fields, CNRS, Grenoble, France
- College of Chemistry and Molecular Engineering, Peking University, China
- Clark University, Worcester, Ma., USA
- Technical University Clausthal, Germany
- Institute of physics problems of P.L.Kapicu, Russian academy of Sciences, Moskau, Russia
- B. Verkin Institute for Low Temperature Physics and Engineering of the National Academy of Sciences of Ukraine, Charkov, Ukrajina
- V.N. Kharazin Kharkiv National University, Charkov, Ukraine
- State University Užhorod, Užhorod, Ukraine
- Centre for research at very low temperatures CNRS, Grenoble, France
- Cretian University, Heraklion, Greece
- University Bayreuth, Germany

and others.

=== Department of Nuclear Physics and Sub-nuclear Physics ===
The research in a field of nuclear and sub-nuclear physics focuses on high-energy collisions of heavy ions, correlation and spin effects in low-nucleon systems in interactions with protons with light nuclei at medium energies. Special attention is given to a participation of employees on the experiment ALICE of the new LHC collider in the CERN complex and to an experiment STAR on accelerators of BROOKHAVEN.

The department carries out the research with the following institutions:

- European Organization for Nuclear Research - CERN, Geneva, Switzerland
- Joint institute of nuclear research - JINR, Dubna, Russia
- Institute of nuclear physics - FZ Jülich, Germany
- Brookhaven National Laboratory - BNL, Brookhaven, USA
- Deutsches Elektronen Synchrotron - DESY, Hamburg, Germany

== See also ==
- Astronomical Institute of Slovak Academy of Sciences
