= Ondřejov Observatory =

Astronomical observatory on the eastern outskirts of Prague, Czech Republic

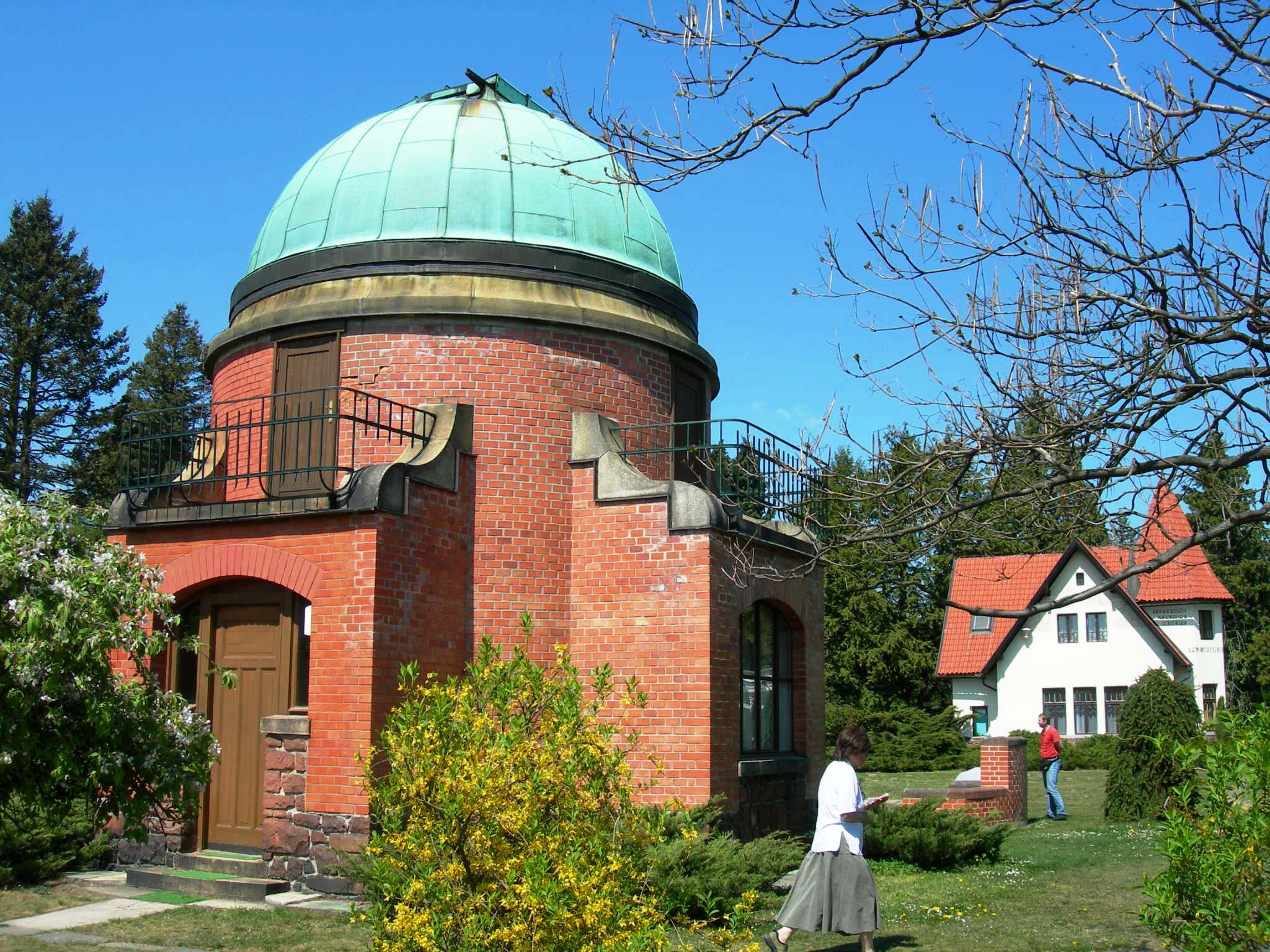
- Historic cupola of the Ondřejov Observatory
- Organization: Astronomical Institute of the Czech Academy of Sciences
- Observatory code: 557
- Location: Ondřejov, Ondřejov, Central Bohemian Region, Czech Republic
- Coordinates: 49°54′33″N 14°46′53″E
- Altitude: 500 m (1,600 ft)
- Established: 1898
- Website: www.asu.cas.cz/cz/verejnost-a-media/prohlidky-pro-verejnost
- Telescopes: Ondřejov 0.65-m telescope; Ondřejov 2-m telescope; Ondřejov radio telescope; SST-1M
- Related media on Commons

The Ondřejov Observatory (pronounced [ˈondr̝ɛjof]; Czech: Observatoř Ondřejov) is the principal observatory of the Astronomical Institute of the Czech Academy of Sciences. It is located in the municipality of Ondřejov, 35 kilometres (22 miles) southeast of Prague, Czech Republic. It has a 2-metre (6 ft 7 in) wide telescope, which is the largest in the Czech Republic.

== History ==
The facility was constructed in 1898, by Czech amateur astronomer and entrepreneur Josef Jan Frič as a private observatory. On 28 October 1928, he donated the facility to the Czechoslovak state to celebrate the tenth anniversary of its independence. The observatory, located at an altitude of 500 metres (1,600 ft), away from the air and light pollution of urban Prague, was administered by Charles University until the founding of the Czechoslovak Academy of Sciences in 1953, which from then on operated it as part of its Astronomical Institute in conjunction with other Czechoslovak observatories.

In 1967, a telescope measuring 2 metres (6 ft 7 in) in width was added to the observatory, which at that time was the 7th largest telescope in the world. Now it is the largest telescope in the Czech Republic and is in the second hundred in the world.

It has been responsible, among other scientific achievements, for the discovery of numerous asteroids; more recent works of astronomers from Ondřejov include examination of the trajectory and origin of the Chelyabinsk meteor. More than 700 minor planets have been discovered at this observatory. While most of these discoveries are officially credited to the astronomers who discovered them, a remaining 23 minor planets are directly credited to "Ondrejov" (the observatory itself) by the Minor Planet Center for the period 1997–2008.

The main-belt asteroid 7204 Ondřejov, discovered by Petr Pravec in 1995, was named for the village where the observatory is located.

Minor planets discovered: 23
see § List of discovered minor planets

== List of discovered minor planets ==
31139 Garnavich	25 September 1997	list
37788 Suchan	25 September 1997	list
42924 Betlem	2 October 1999	list
42981 Jenniskens	2 October 1999	list
53285 Mojmír	24 March 1999	list
76713 Wudia	6 May 2000	list
82559 Emilbřezina	28 July 2001	list
(109353) 2001 QS_{153}	26 August 2001	list
(113389) 2002 SF_{17}	28 September 2002	list
(119113) 2001 OE_{77}	28 July 2001	list
127196 Hanaceplechová	16 April 2002	list
(131423) 2001 OF_{77}	29 July 2001	list

(138439) 2000 HD_{98}	26 April 2000	list
(164782) 1999 DK_{4}	16 February 1999	list
(172097) 2002 EX_{107}	8 March 2002	list
(216476) 1999 SC_{22}	23 September 1999	list
(264493) 2001 PS_{50}	15 August 2001	list
(281660) 2008 VQ_{13}	5 November 2008	list
(286148) 2001 TG_{217}	14 October 2001	list
(316333) 2010 RP_{123}	19 September 2001	list
(337680) 2001 TR_{209}	12 October 2001	list
(352835) 2008 VR_{13}	6 November 2008	list
(362805) 2011 YZ_{4}	2 December 1999	list

== Gallery ==
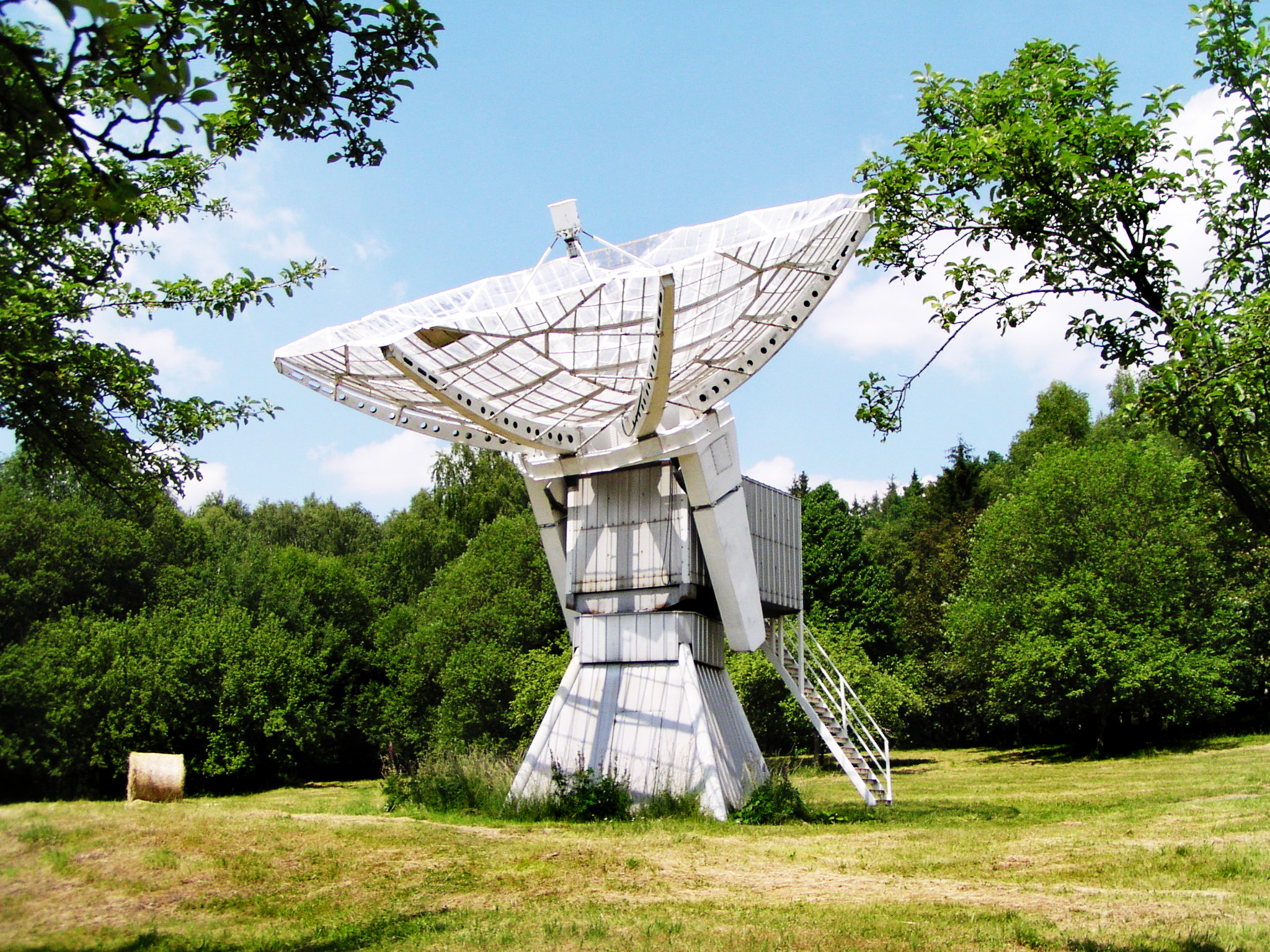
Ten-meter solar flux monitor at Ondřejov

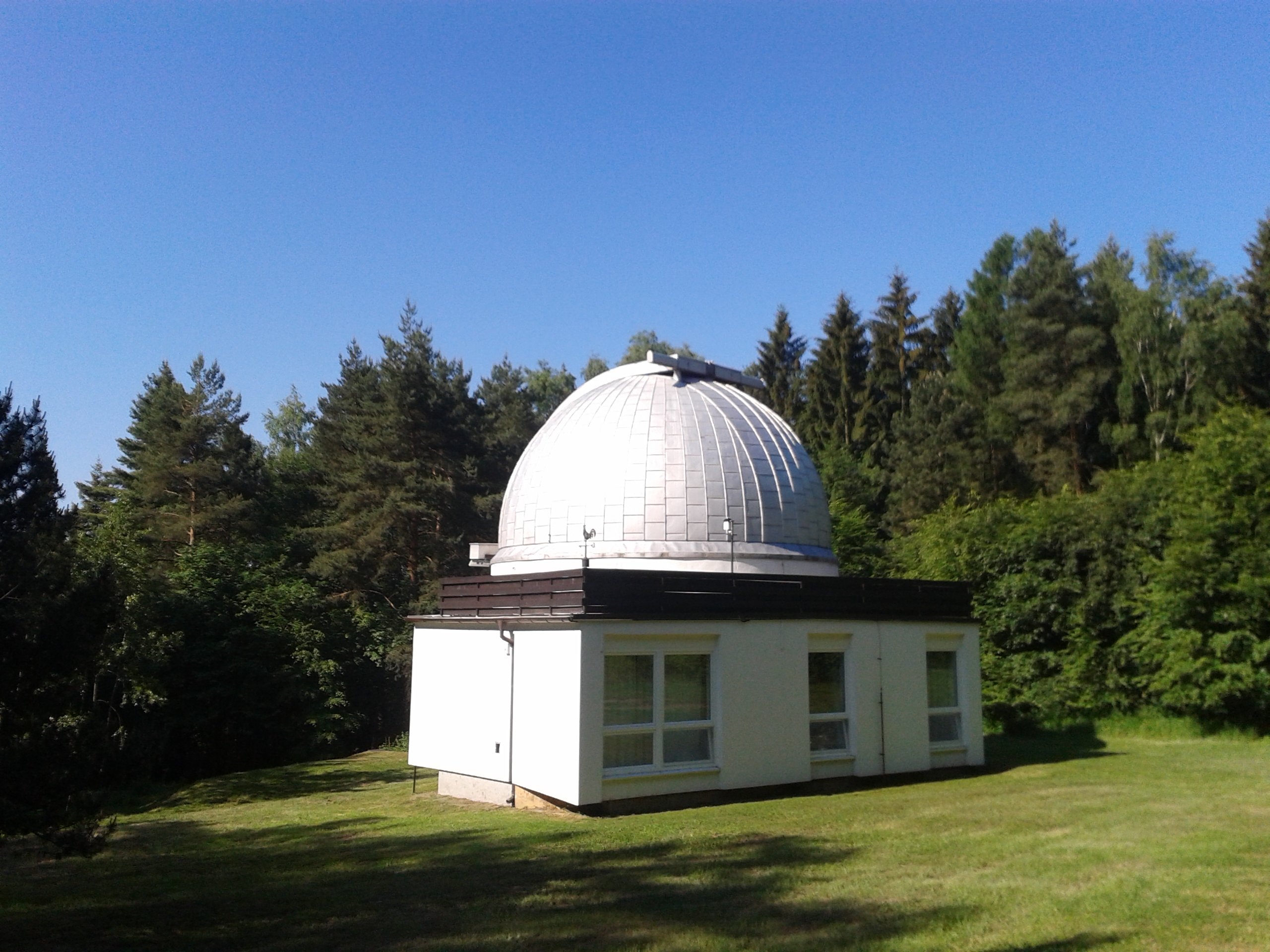
The dome of the 65-cm telescope

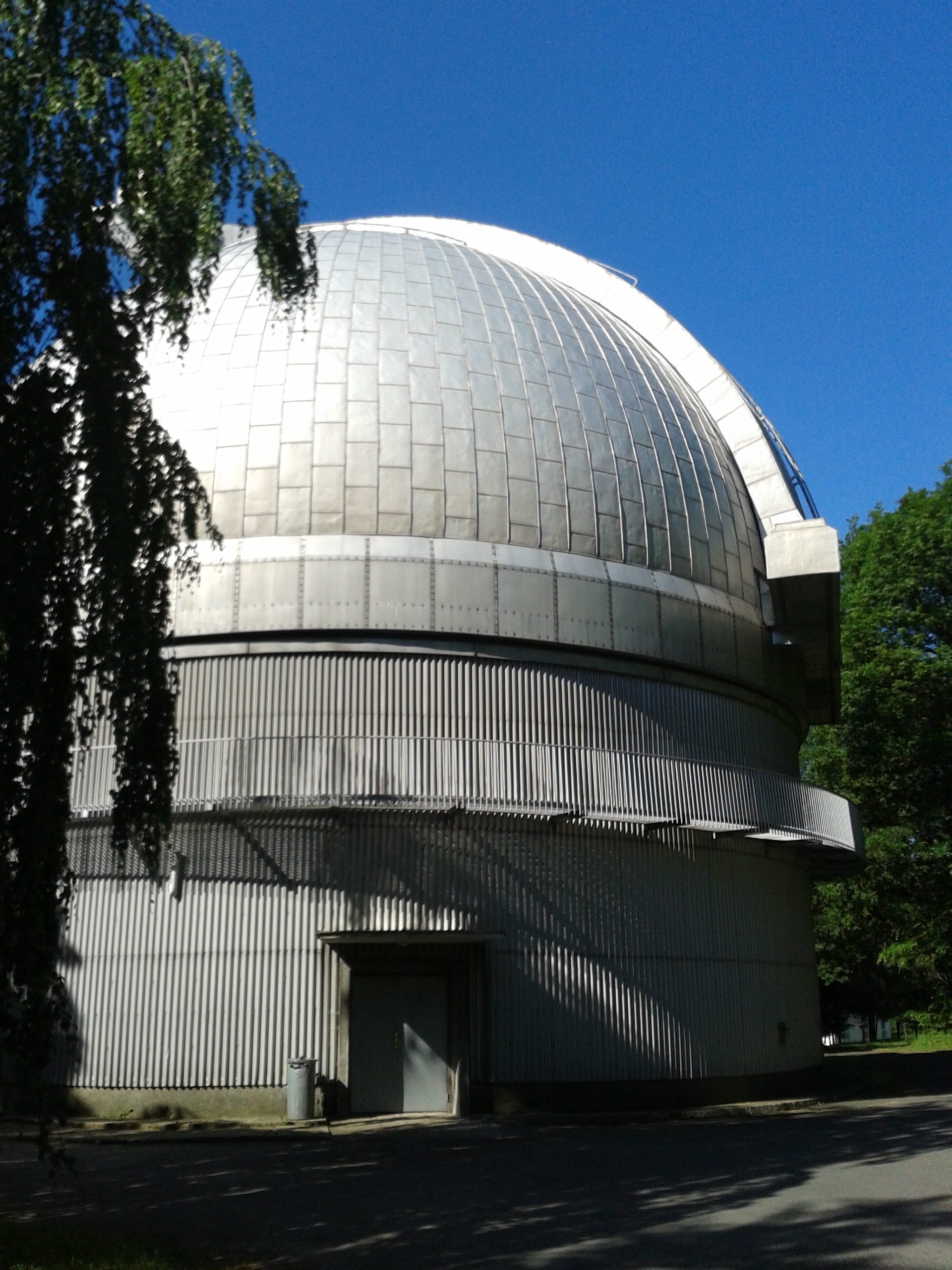
The dome of the 2-m telescope

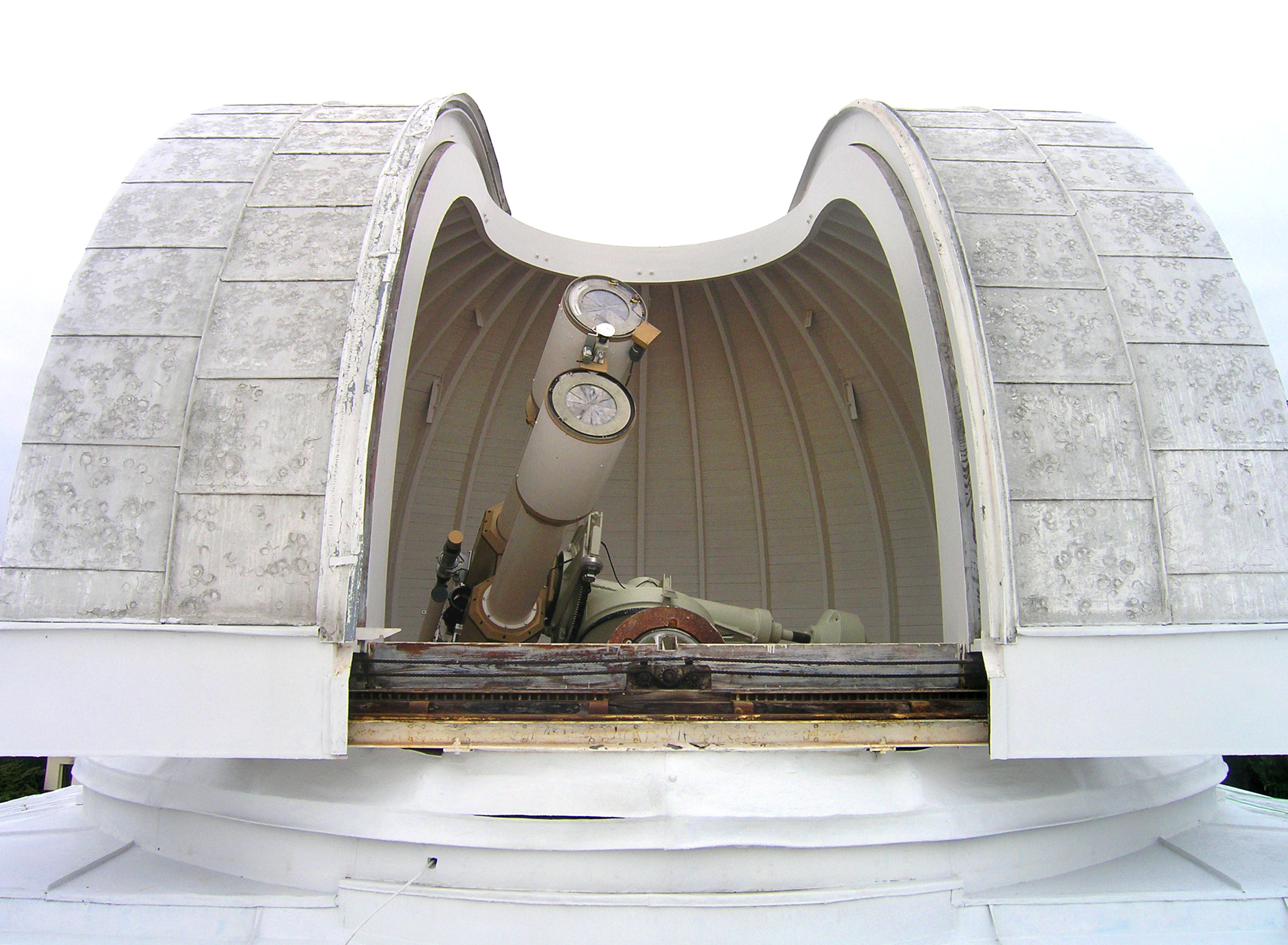
Solar Telescope with outer housing

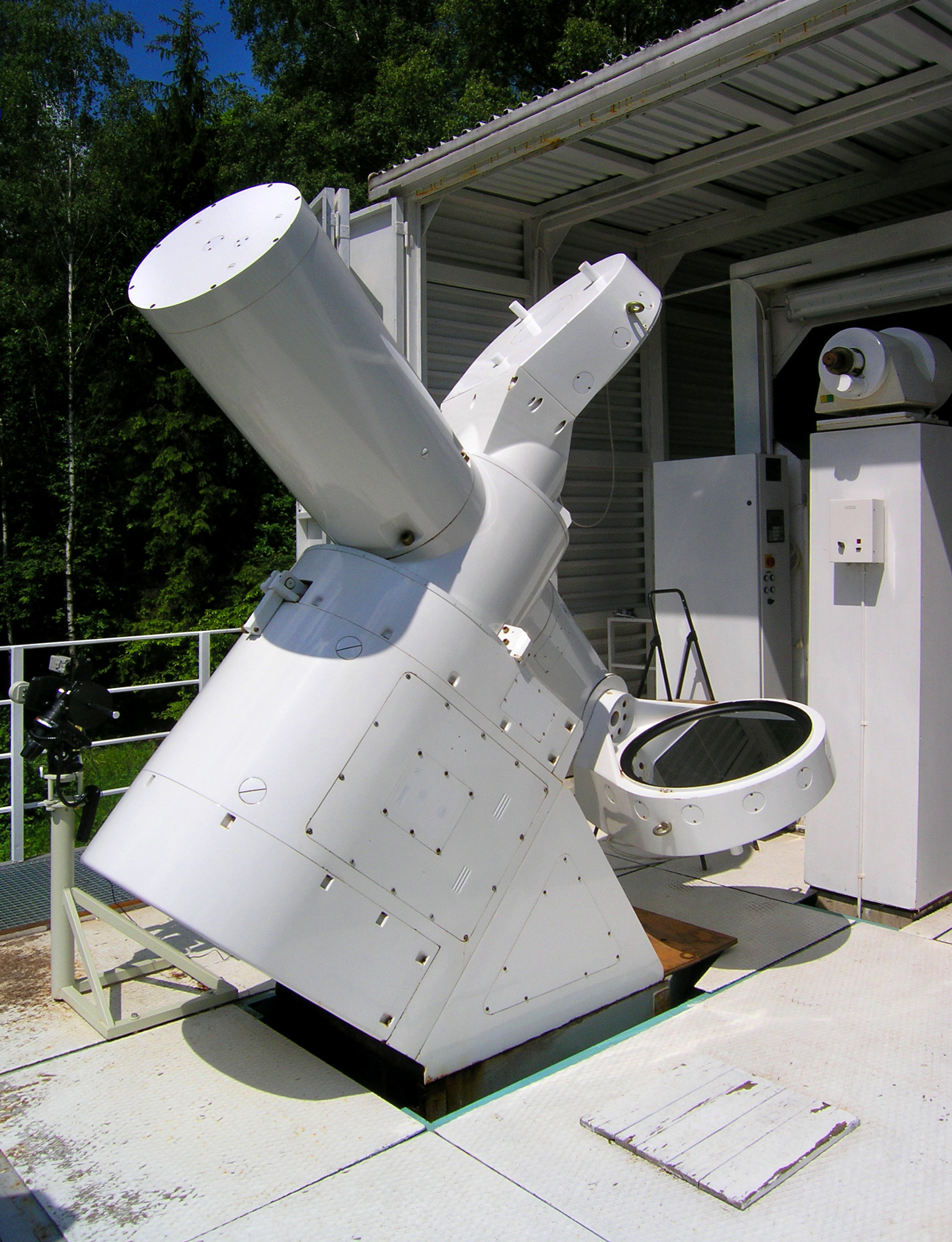
Horizontal Solar Spectrograph

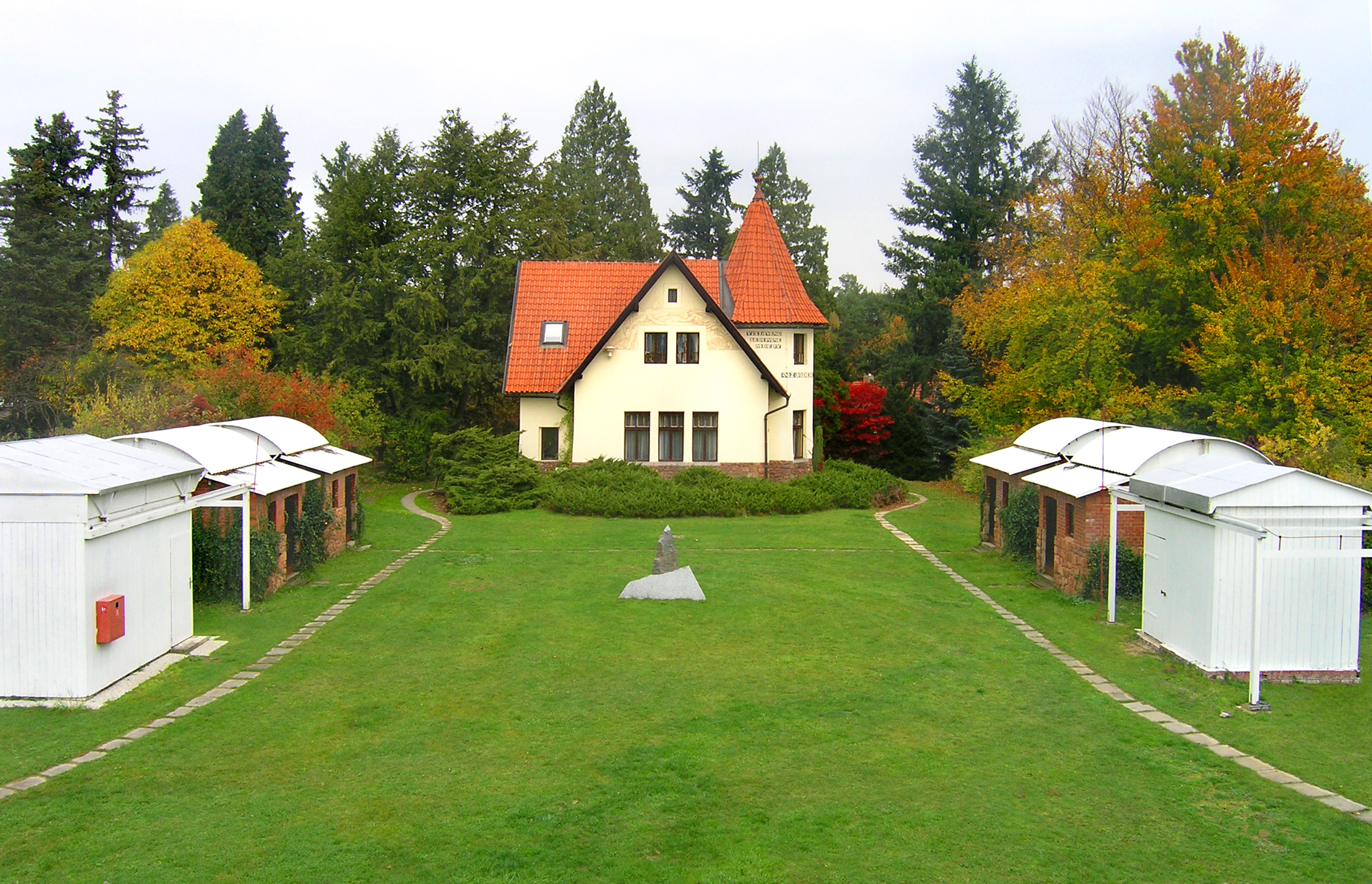
Central plain with former J. J. Frič house

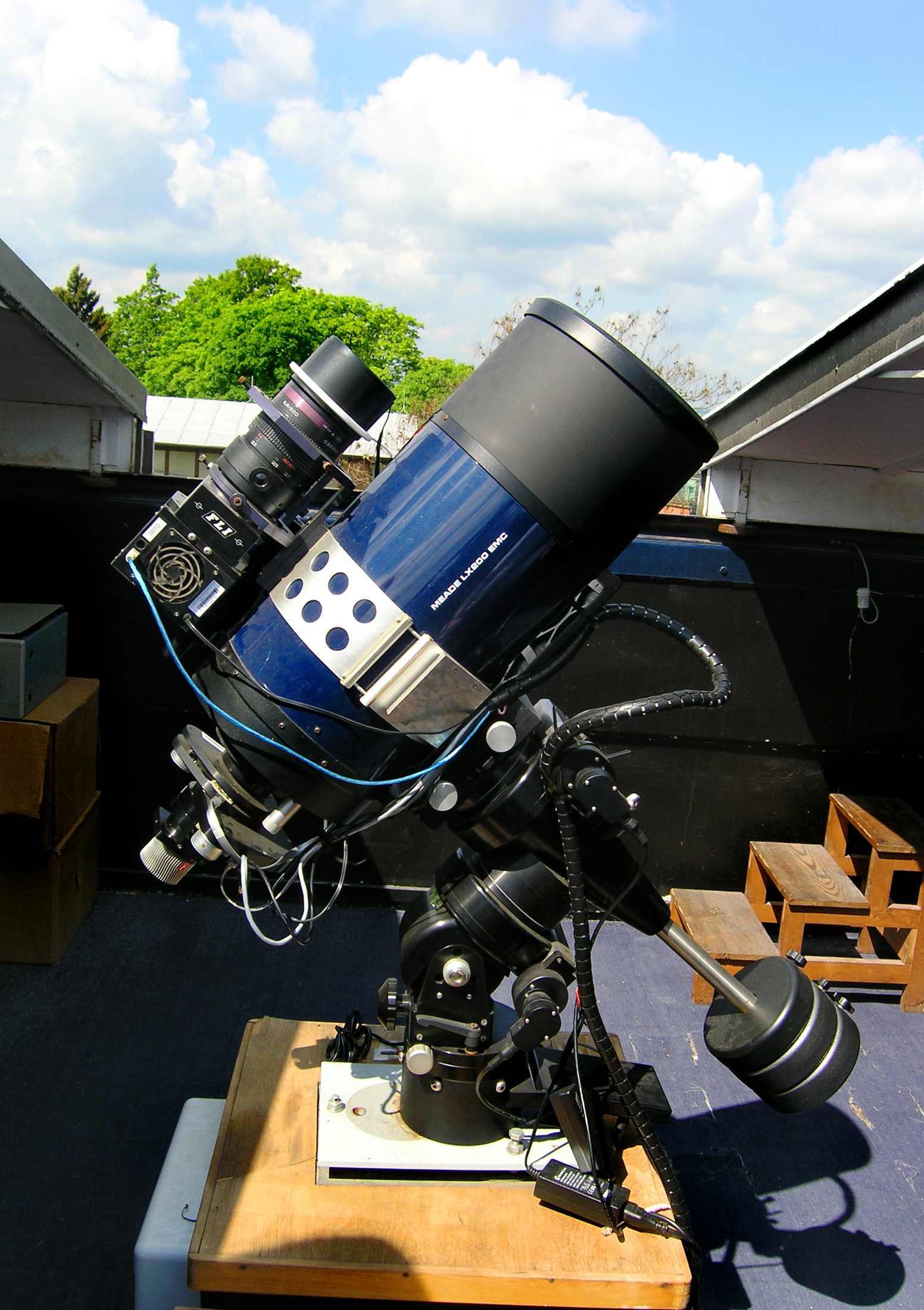
Robotic telescope BART

== See also ==
- List of asteroid-discovering observatories
- List of astronomical observatories
- List of minor planet discoverers § Discovering dedicated institutions
- List of observatory codes
