= Ondřejov (Prague-East District) =

- Municipality
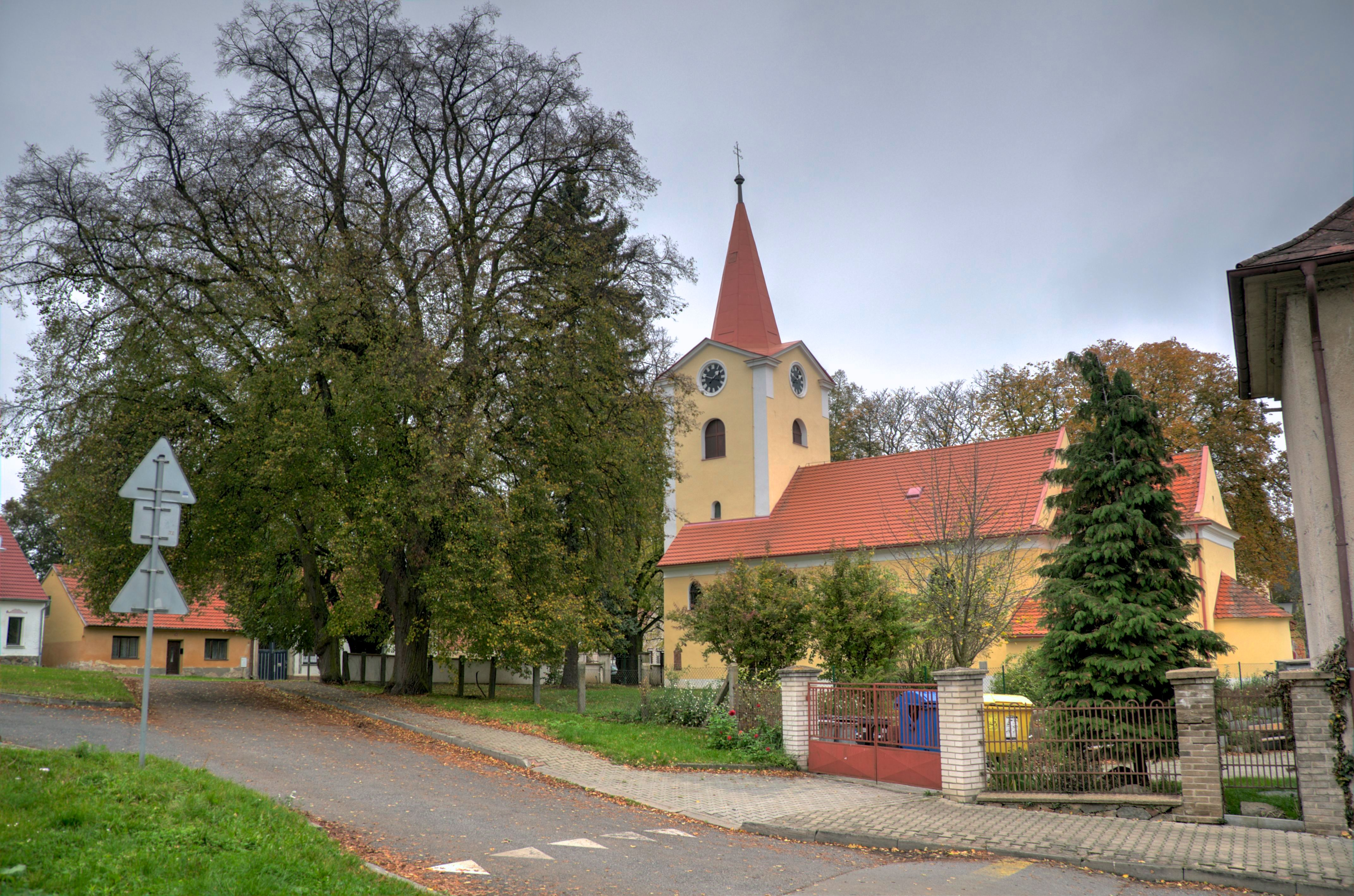
- Church of Saints Simon and Jude

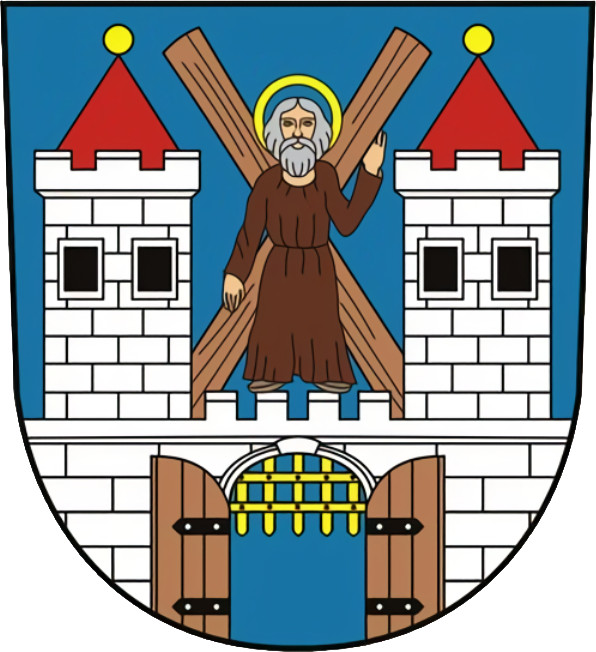
- Flag Coat of arms

- Location in the Czech Republic
- Coordinates: 49°54′17″N 14°47′3″E
- Country: Czech Republic
- Region: Central Bohemian
- District: Prague-East
- First mentioned: 1352

Area
  - Total: 18.15 km^{2} (7.01 sq mi)
- Elevation: 467 m (1,532 ft)

Population (2026-01-01)
  - Total: 1,867
  - Density: 102.9/km^{2} (266.4/sq mi)
- Time zone: UTC+1 (CET)
  - Summer (DST): UTC+2 (CEST)
- Postal codes: 251 65, 251 66
- Website: www.obecondrejov.cz

Ondřejov (Czech pronunciation: [ˈondr̝ɛjof]) is a municipality and village in Prague-East District in the Central Bohemian Region of the Czech Republic. It has about 1,900 inhabitants. It is known for the Ondřejov Observatory. The historic centre is well preserved and is protected as an urban monument zone.

== Administrative division ==
Ondřejov consists of three municipal parts (in brackets population according to the 2021 census):

- Ondřejov (1,201)
- Třemblat (360)
- Turkovice (266)

== Etymology ==
Ondřejov (meaning "Ondřej's") was probably named after its founded Ondřej of Dubá. Saint Andrew (Czech: svatý Ondřej) is in the municipal coat of arms.

== Geography ==
Ondřejov is located about 25 kilometres (16 mi) southeast of Prague. It lies in the Benešov Uplands. The highest point is the Pecný hill at 545 m (1,788 ft) above sea level.

== History ==
The first written mention of Ondřejov is from 1352. Among the owners of the village were the noble families of Dubá, Kostka of Postupice, Šelenberk and Waldstein. The development of Ondřejov was greatly hampered by the Hussite Wars in the 15th century and the Thirty Years' War in the 17th century. In 1745, Ondřejov was promoted to a market town, but it lost the title after World War II.

== Demographics ==
Historical population

Year	Pop.	±%
1869	1,292	—
1880	1,244	−3.7%
1890	1,248	+0.3%
1900	1,193	−4.4%
1910	1,096	−8.1%

Year	Pop.	±%
1921	1,054	−3.8%
1930	1,082	+2.7%
1950	1,065	−1.6%
1961	1,165	+9.4%
1970	1,164	−0.1%

Year	Pop.	±%
1980	1,170	+0.5%
1991	1,088	−7.0%
2001	1,076	−1.1%
2011	1,425	+32.4%
2021	1,827	+28.2%

Source: Censuses

== Transport ==
The D1 motorway from Prague to Brno runs through the western part of the municipal territory.

== Science ==
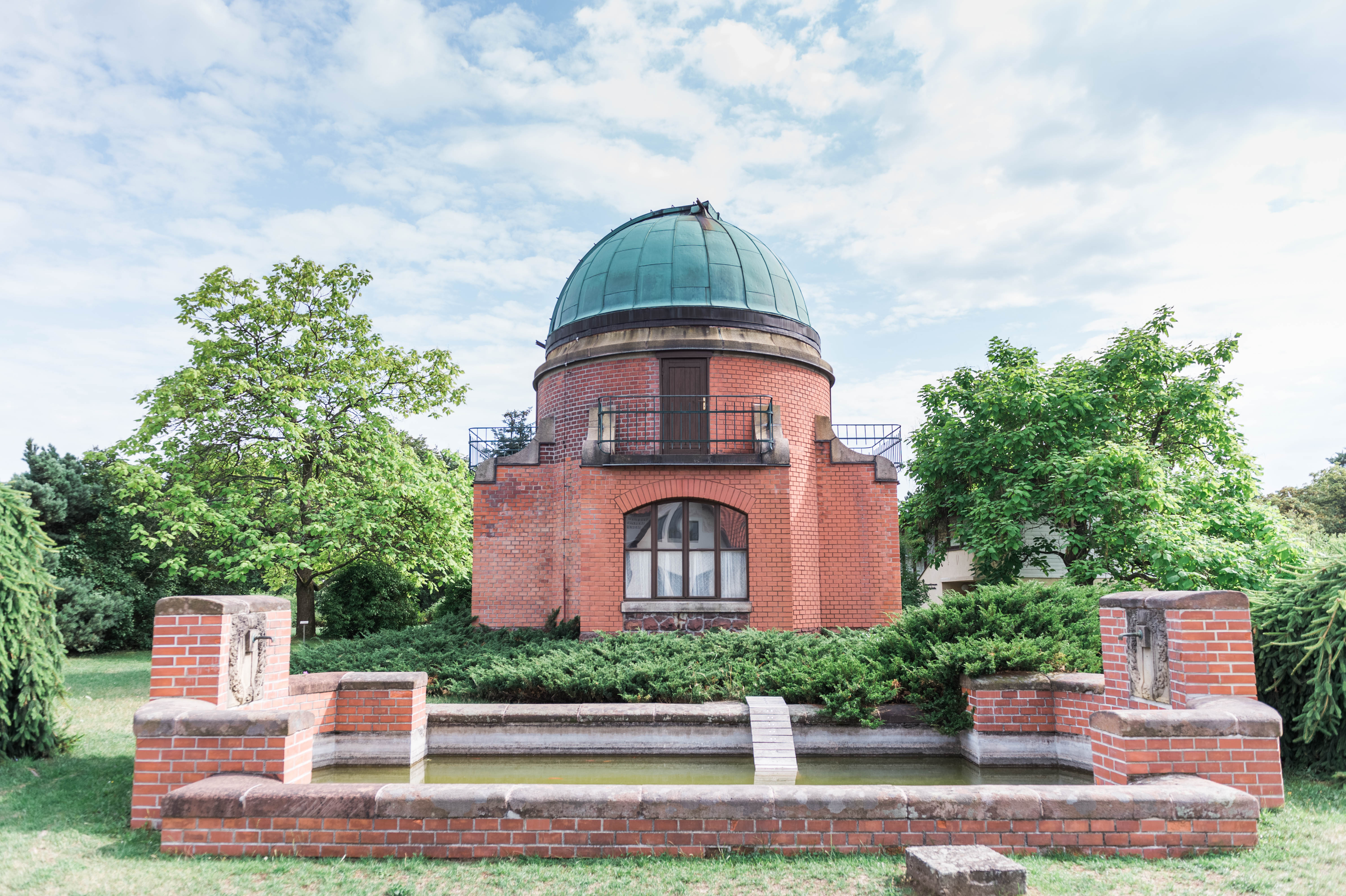
Ondřejov Observatory

In 1898–1906, the industrialist Josef Jan Frič built an astronomical observatory in the village, which he gave to the Charles University in 1928. Today the Ondřejov Observatory is operated by the Astronomical Institute of the Czech Academy of Sciences. Its part also houses the Vojtěch Šafařík Astronomical Museum.

== Sights ==
The Church of Saints Simon and Jude was originally a Romanesque building, modified in the Baroque style in 1668. The adjacent Baroque building of the rectory was built in 1778–1780.

== Notable people ==
- Eleonora Ehrenbergová (1832–1912) opera singer; died here and is buried here
