= 2014 Ontario fireball =

2014 daylight bolide which occurred near Ontario

Coordinates: 44.15°N 77.79°W

On 4 May 2014 around 4:17pm (EDT) a daylight bolide occurred near Ontario, resulting in a meteor air burst. The meteoroid was estimated to be roughly 50–100 centimetres (20–39 inches) in diameter. The explosion was estimated to be equivalent to approximately 10–20 tons of TNT. The meteor was first seen in Peterborough and traveled on a southwest-to-northeast trajectory. A meteor of this size impacts Earth about twice a week.

The meteor was large enough that it may have generated meteorites. A strewn field has not yet been located but would be downstream after dark flight. Weather radar returns suggest that the meteorite(s) may have landed near Codrington.
