= Tilden Meteor =

Large meteorite that landed in Illinois

Coordinates: 38°12′N 89°41′W

The Tilden Meteor was a meteor air burst and bolide that occurred over Tilden, Illinois, on July 13, 1927. The air burst scattered meteorite fragments over a 2 miles (3.2 km) radius; three large fragments from the meteor were recovered by researchers. It is notable for being the first and largest known meteor impact in Illinois and a meteorite fall that was observed by a large number of eyewitnesses.

== Overview ==
Around 1:00 pm (local time) on July 13, 1927, eyewitnesses in the vicinity of Tilden, Illinois, reported seeing or hearing a large meteor pass overhead that resembled "a piece falling off the sun." The meteor approached from the southeast and was described as humming like an airplane prior to exploding in three distinctive sets of explosions that shook houses in the area. The explosions flashed green and purple and were followed by a roar described as similar to the sound of a tornado or an earthquake. Following the explosions, fragments of the meteor were witnessed falling toward the ground, where they were said to resemble "a dark streak, like smoke, for an instant." Witnesses also heard fragments of the meteor "shrieking" toward the ground as well as thudding sounds representing the actual impacts.

Eyewitness accounts of the meteor were collected by notable astronomers Charles Pollard Olivier and Charles Wylie, both of whom visited Tilden shortly after the meteorite impacted.

== Eyewitness Reports ==
Local resident Allan Raney provided the following account:

"I was sitting on my front porch after dinner yesterday when I was attracted by a rushing sound, seemingly coming from a great height above. The noise grew louder and sounded to me like the humming sound made by the propeller of an airplane. The sound grew steadily louder until it seemed directly overhead. I got up from my chair and started to investigate, when suddenly there came the report of a terrific explosion high overhead in the sky, then another and another.

As I walked off the porch, I heard a distinct shriek overhead and peering into the sky in the direction where the sound came from I saw something resembling a streak of lighting descend toward the earth, followed immediately by a puff of fust on the ground about 100 yards [91 m] north of my neighbor John Stone's house.

Curious, I walked over to the place where I saw the object fall and to my astonishment discovered a wedge-shaped piece of what appeared to be a rock, imbedded about a one foot [30 cm] in the earth. I looked at it awhile then I cautiously touched it with my finger and found it was cold, much cooler to the touch than any ordinary material of its kind found lying on the ground. In fact it felt as if it had just come out of a refrigerator."

== Meteorites ==
Three large meteorite fragments along with a smaller fourth fragment were recovered immediately after the fall.

The largest fragment, weighing approximately 110 pounds (50 kg), struck the edge of a farm field and was driven into the soil over three and a half feet (110 cm) deep. It was excavated from the soil and is now housed in Iowa State University. A large, approximately 46 pounds (21 kg) fragment, was found in a clover field by several local boys who saw flying dust from the fragment's impact with the field.

A fragment weighing approximately 9 pounds (4.1 kg) was found near downtown Tilden in a residential yard. This fragment was sliced so researchers could study its composition; these slices are now located in the Field Museum of Natural History and the National Museum of American History. The smallest fragment, weighing less than one pound (0.45 kg), was found on a residential yard in Sparta, Illinois.
