= 1930 Curuçá River event =

Possible meteorite fall over Curuçá River, Brazil

Coordinates: 5°1′S 71°38′W

1930 Curuçá River event

The 1930 Curuçá River event refers to the possible fall of objects on 13 August 1930 over the area of Curuçá River in Brazil. It is based on the account of a single investigator who interviewed witnesses to the purported event and then wrote a letter to the Vatican Observatory.

== Overview ==
The event received little attention until 1995, when British astronomer Mark E. Bailey found in the Vatican Library archives a 1931 issue of L'Osservatore Romano, which contained a dispatch from the Franciscan friar Fedele d'Alviano. D'Alviano had visited the region five days after the event and interviewed people from the region; they told him they were frightened by what had happened. According to Bailey, the Curuçá event was one of the most important impact events of the 20th century.

Inspired by Bailey's article and based on images from Landsat satellites, the Brazilian astrophysicist Ramiro de la Reza attempted to find an astrobleme—the remains of a meteorite impact crater. He explored a circular feature measuring 1 km in diameter, to the southeast of the village of Argemiro, but found no evidence for impact.

In the first week of June 1997, de la Reza led an expedition organized by Rede Globo and co-financed by ABC Television of Australia, to the region where the event is said to have occurred. Subsequent researchers have concluded that the circular feature is unrelated to the reported event, and is not an impact crater.

Assuming that the reported event was an air burst, various researchers have estimated the initial mass of the meteor at between 1,000 and 25,000 tons. Estimates for the energy released have varied from 9 kilotons, 100 kilotons, and 5 megatons, though most estimates place the energy at below 1 megaton, comparable to the Chelyabinsk meteor.

== See also ==
- List of meteor air bursts
- List of possible impact structures on Earth
