= Kamchatka meteor =

2018 impact event off eastern Russia

- The bolide captured by Himawari 8 operated by the Japan Meteorological Agency.
- Date: 18 December 2018
- Time: 11:48 local time (23:48 UTC)
- Location: The Bering Sea, near the Kamchatka Peninsula, Russia; 56.9°N 172.4°E
- Cause: 10-14-meter (32-45-foot) asteroid Impact energy: 173 kiloton Radiated energy: 130 TJ

The Kamchatka meteor was a meteor that exploded in an air burst off the east coast of the Kamchatka Peninsula in eastern Russia on 18 December 2018. At around midday, local time, an asteroid roughly 10 meters in diameter entered the atmosphere at a speed of 32.0 km/s (72,000 mph), with a TNT equivalent energy of 173 kilotons, more than 10 times the energy of the Little Boy bomb dropped on Hiroshima in 1945. The object entered at a steep angle of 7 degrees, close to the zenith, terminating in an air burst at an altitude of around 25 km (16 mi; 82,000 ft).

== Overview ==
Based on the energy and velocity of the impact, the asteroid had a mass of 1600 tonnes and a diameter of between 10 and 14 meters (33 and 46 ft) depending on its density. The impact was announced around 8 March 2019, and is the largest asteroid to impact Earth since the 20-meter Chelyabinsk meteor's entry in February 2013, and the third largest recorded meteor since 1900 after that and the Tunguska event.

NASA's Terra satellite and the Japanese Meteorological Agency's Himawari 8 recorded the dust trail from the event, although their observation interval was too long to image the air burst itself.

The dominant period of the CTBTO infrasound was very long, on the order of 20 to 25 seconds, corresponding to energy on the order of 100 to 200 kilotons. The shockwave was strong enough to have cracked windows had the shockwave been over a built-up region.

Even though it was only six years after the previous one, events as large as this are statistically estimated to occur only once every few decades on average.

As of January 2017, over 723,000 asteroids were being tracked in the Solar System, with more discovered, lost and recovered daily. Since 2011, on average, 80 new minor planets of diameter 30–50 meters or more are discovered each day. As of March 2019, 724 (roughly one in a thousand) are classified as potentially hazardous asteroids (PHA). Neither the Chelyabinsk nor the Kamchatka meteors were on the list and would have been too small to detect with current resources.

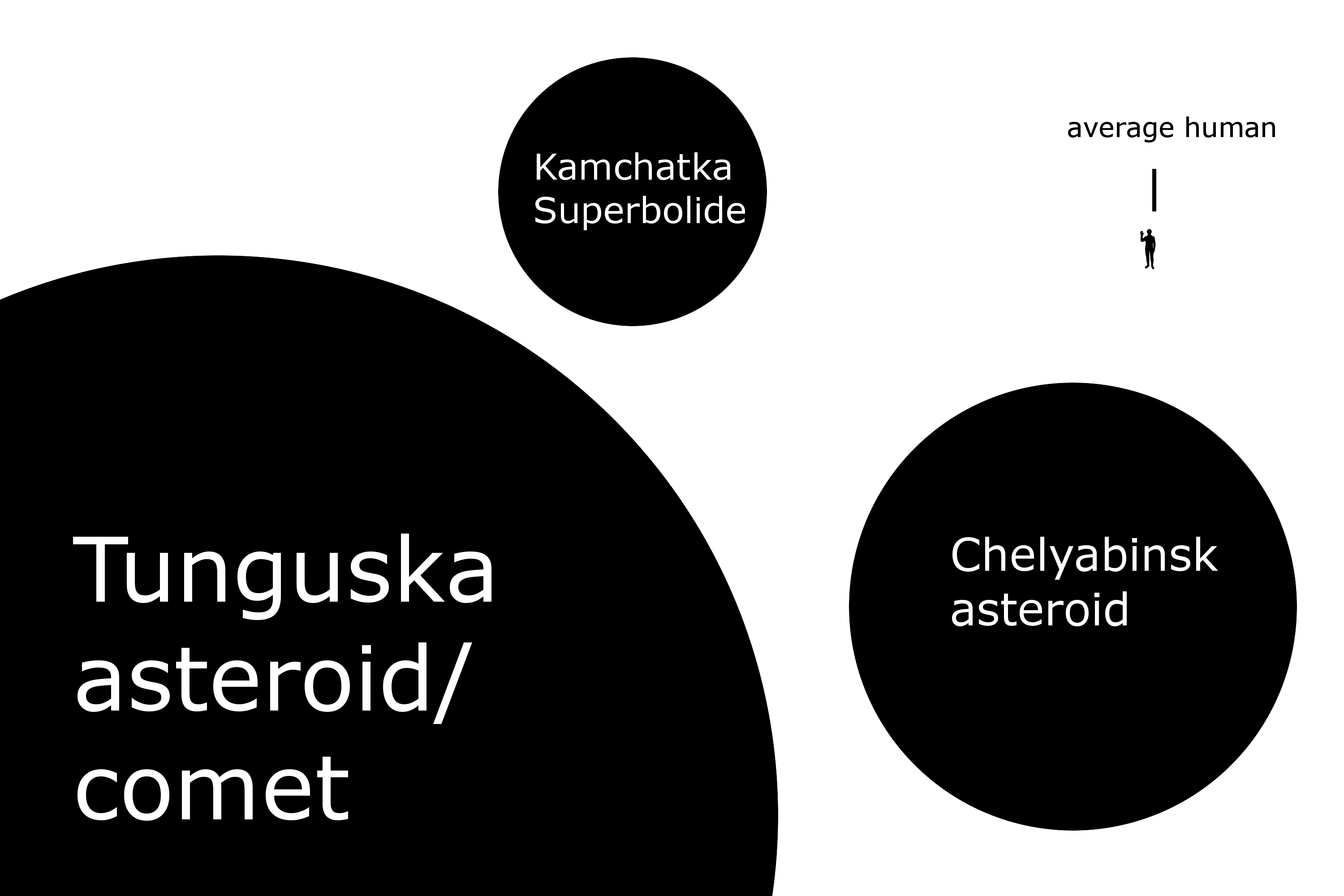
Approximate sizes of the Kamchatka object, Chelyabinsk asteroid, and the Tunguska object relative to a human.

Comparing the Tunguska (1), Chelyabinsk (2) and Kamchatka (3) events' locations
