= 1919 Michigan Event =

Possible meteorite fall over Michigan & Indiana, United States

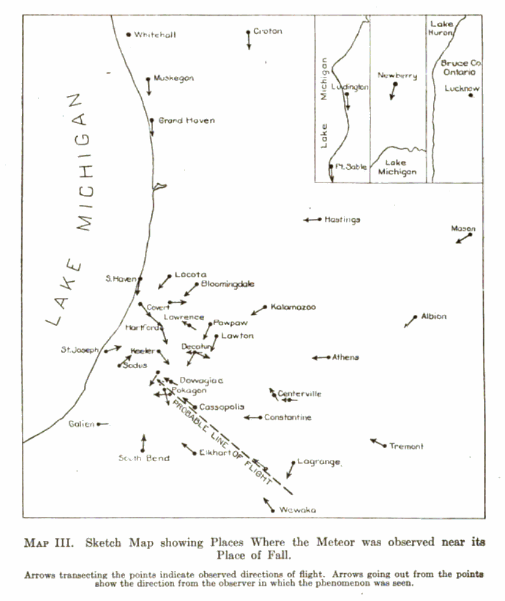
William Herbert Hobb's diagram of eyewitness sightings of the 1919 Michigan meteor.

The 1919 Michigan Event refers to a possible meteor air burst on the evening of November 26, 1919, over far northern Indiana and southern Michigan in the United States.

== Overview ==
Shortly before 8:00 pm (local time) on November 26, 1919, dozens of eyewitnesses throughout northern Indiana and southern Michigan reported seeing a "brilliant meteor" traveling westward toward Lake Michigan; the meteor was widely reported as both extremely colorful and producing audible sounds. The meteor was also sighted in more distant locations, including Newberry, Michigan, within the state's Upper Peninsula, Lucknow, Ontario, and across Lake Michigan in Milwaukee, Wisconsin. The shockwave from the meteor created earthquake-like tremors which caused damage to telephone lines, telegraph lines, and electrical infrastructure.

== Selected eyewitness reports ==
William Herbert Hobbs recorded this account from Leroy Milhan, from Centreville, Michigan:

"Very bright-yellowish light suffused the clouds and seemingly every particle of cold, misty rain that was falling. The road, trees, houses, and even ourselves were bathed in a blinding phosphorescent-like glow which had its center in a bright streak in the sky above us. It passed over us toward the west. Immediately came a muffled report or jar that shook houses and the very earth like an earthquake."

Coast Guard stations on the eastern shoreline of Lake Michigan reported the following:

"A brilliant meteor was scene by watchmen at the Coast Guard stations at Ludington and Point Sable at 7:45 P.M. on the twenty-sixth. It was first seen almost overhead, whence it moved to the south, leaving a trail of blue. When near the southern horizon, and apparently along the lake shore, it burst like a sky-rocket into many pieces, which were colored blue, red, green, and yellow and otherwise, and fell to the ground. A swishing was heard as the meteor passed through the air; no explosion and no shock were felt."

Hobbs recorded this account from L. L. Hamilton from Decatur, Michigan, who was driving west of Dowagiac, Michigan:

"I was frightened by a white light touched with green and by flashes that were at least ten or fifteen seconds displayed. A big ball of fire which looked as big as a balloon disappeared in the woods in front of me. When this occurred, I pulled up on the clutch, and stopped. It seemed as thought I was stunned and could not stir. I did not hear a very loud sound – only a jar – as my engine was running. I regained my senses, the light disappeared, and I resumed my journey. I could not see anything in the woods, but noticed an odor like sulphur burning...all was lighted up like day in the direction of the woods for a few seconds, and feeling sure my machine was on fire, I made an attempt to get out and see."

== Impact Location ==
Newspaper accounts in the following days widely quoted a Grand Haven, Michigan lighthouse keeper, who claimed that the meteor impacted Lake Michigan. A subsequent analysis by geologist William Herbert Hobbs, published by the Michigan Academy of Science, Arts, and Letters, suggested that these reports may have been exaggerated. Hobbs interviewed witnesses throughout Michigan and northern Indiana and determined that the majority of the meteor likely exploded in the air near Pokagon, Michigan. While Hobbs was initially optimistic about finding fragments of the meteor based on his analysis of its flight path, none were ever located.
