= North American Meteor Network =

The North American Meteor Network (NAMN) was established in June 1995 as an electronic social network of people using the Web to share an interest in meteors. With over 600 members, NAMN has three main purposes:

- to recruit amateurs into the ranks of meteor observing
- provide guidance, instructions and training in the methods of meteor observing
- coordinate meteor observations in order to collect useful data for investigating sporadic and meteor shower activity

NAMN publishes a monthly newsletter NAMN Notes and co-sponsors the Global Meteor Observing Forum meteorobs.

== See also ==
- List of astronomical societies
