= Sutter's Mill meteorite =

Meteorite that fell to Earth on 22 April 2012

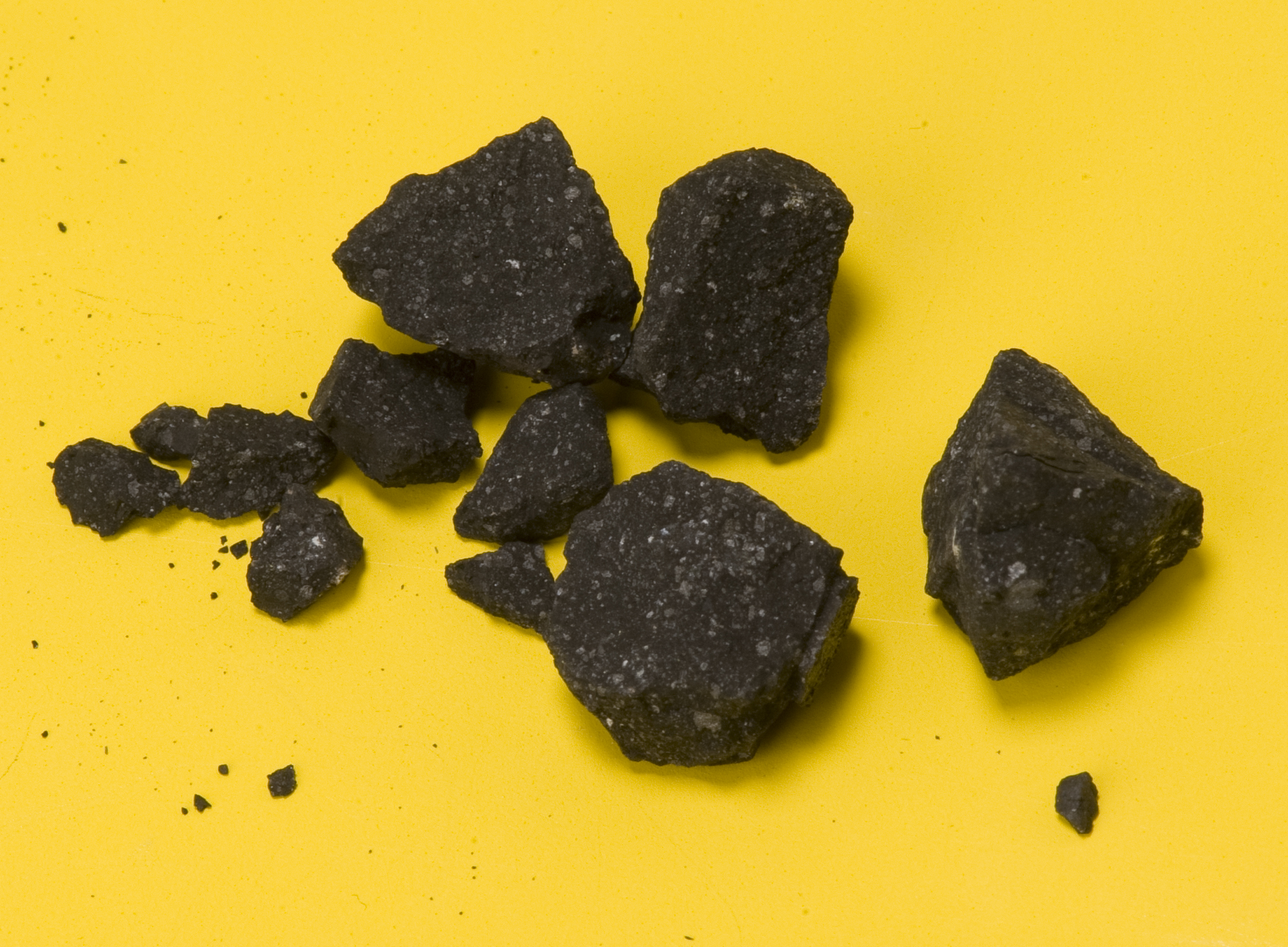
- Fragments of the Sutter's Mill meteorite obtained from Henningsen Lotus Park, Lotus, California.
- Type: Chondrite
- Class: Carbonaceous chondrite
- Group: C
- Country: United States
- Region: California
- Coordinates: 37.6°N 120.5°W (airburst); 38°48'14"N, 120°54'29"W
- Observed fall: Yes
- Fall date: 22 April 2012
- Found date: 24 April 2012
- TKW: 952.7 grams
- Strewn field: Yes
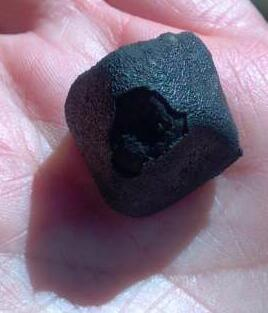
- SM33 (8.5 g) fragment with a small part of the fusion crust missing
- Related media on Wikimedia Commons

The Sutter's Mill meteorite is a carbonaceous chondrite which entered the Earth's atmosphere and broke up at about 07:51 Pacific Time on 22 April 2012, with fragments landing in the United States. The name comes from Sutter's Mill, a California gold rush site, near which some pieces were recovered. Meteor astronomer Peter Jenniskens assigned Sutter's Mill (SM) numbers to each meteorite, with the documented find location preserving information about where a given meteorite was located in the impacting meteoroid. As of May 2014, 79 fragments had been publicly documented with a find location. The largest (SM53) weighs 205 grams (7.2 oz), and the second largest (SM50) weighs 42 grams (1.5 oz).

The meteorite was found to contain some of the oldest material in the Solar System. Two 10-micron diamond grains (xenoliths) were found in meteorite fragments recovered before any rain fell as the rain would degrade the purity of the meteorites for scientific study. In primitive meteorites like Sutter's Mill, some grains survived from what existed in the cloud of gas, dust and ice that formed the Solar System.

== History ==
During the 2012 Lyrids meteor shower, a bolide and sonic boom rattled buildings in California and Nevada in daylight conditions in the early morning at 07:51 PDT on 22 April 2012. The meteor air burst was caused by a random meteoroid, not a member of the Lyrids shower. The bolide was so bright that witnesses were seeing spots afterward. The falling meteorites were detected by weather radar over an area centered on the Sutter's Mill site in Coloma, between Auburn, California, and Placerville, California.

Robert Ward found a small C chondrite fragment in the Henningsen Lotus Park just west of Coloma, CA on 24 April 2012. Later that day, Peter Jenniskens found a crushed 4 g meteorite in the parking lot of that same park and Brien Cook found a 5 g meteorite off Petersen Road in Lotus. These were the only meteorites found before rain hit the area on 25 April.

On 1 May 2012, the James W. Marshall Gold Discovery State Historic Park's ranger Suzie Matin discovered two pieces of the meteorite (SM14 @ 11.5 grams) in her front yard. The park contains what is now known as Sutter's Mill (site). On 3 May 2012 scientists with the Ames Research Center and the SETI Institute utilized an airship to search the strewn field for the impact scars of kg-sized meteorites, but it is now understood that the high entry speed prevented the survival of meteorites as large as found in the Murchison meteorite fall. Ground-based searches resulted in the additional recovery of two pristinely collected meteorites (SM12 and SM67) for scientific study.

== Comparisons ==
This is the third witnessed meteorite fall in modern California, following Red Canyon Lake on 11 August 2007 and San Juan Capistrano on 15 March 1973, while a few months after this event the Novato meteorite fell on 17 October 2012.

A consortium of over 50 scientists investigated the circumstances of the impact and the properties of the meteorites. The event was recorded by two infrasound monitoring stations of the Comprehensive Nuclear-Test-Ban Treaty Organization's International Monitoring System. The preliminary analyses are indicative of an energy yield of approximately four kilotons of TNT equivalent. Hiroshima's "Little Boy" had a yield of about 16 kt. The air burst had approximate coordinates of 37.6°N 120.5°W.

Based on the infrasound signal and the brightness of the fireball in photographs and two video records, the incoming meteoroid was estimated to have been 6.6–13.1 feet (2–4 m) in diameter, between the size of a dishwasher and a minivan. Before entry in Earth's atmosphere, the meteoroid probably had an absolute magnitude (H) of roughly 31. The meteoroid entered at a record speed of 64,000 ± 1,600 mph (28.6 ± 0.7 km/s), the fastest fireball on record from which meteorites were later recovered. It broke apart at an altitude of 157,000 ft (48 km), the highest breakup event on record resulting in meteorites on the ground.

Before entry, the meteoroid moved on an eccentric orbit, stretching from just inside the orbit of Jupiter to the orbit of Mercury. The orbit had a shallow inclination and an orbital period suggesting that this meteoroid originated in the 3:1 mean motion resonance with Jupiter. The CM chondrite Maribo moved on a similar orbit, but rotated by 120 degrees in the direction of the line of apsides. The asteroid family that is the source region of CM chondrite-type meteorites is now thought to be located close to the 3:1 mean motion resonance, in low-inclined orbits, and may be the Eulalia asteroid family.

The meteorite type is similar to that of the 1969 Murchison meteorite in Australia. Unlike Murchison, Sutter's Mill shows clear brecciation: fragments of CM lithologies with different aqueous alteration and thermal processing histories are embedded in a fine grained CM matrix material. The Sutter's Mill meteorite originated from near the surface of its parent body. As a whole, Sutter's Mill is harder than Murchison.

The pre-rain collected meteorite SM2 was found to contain the mineral oldhamite (CaS), a mineral that reacts readily with water vapor. This xenolithic material may have come from enstatite chondrites impacting on the surface of the CM chondrite parent body in the past.

The Sutter's Mill meteorite is used to test sample collection and analysis procedures for NASA's OSIRIS-REx sample return mission.

== Examples ==
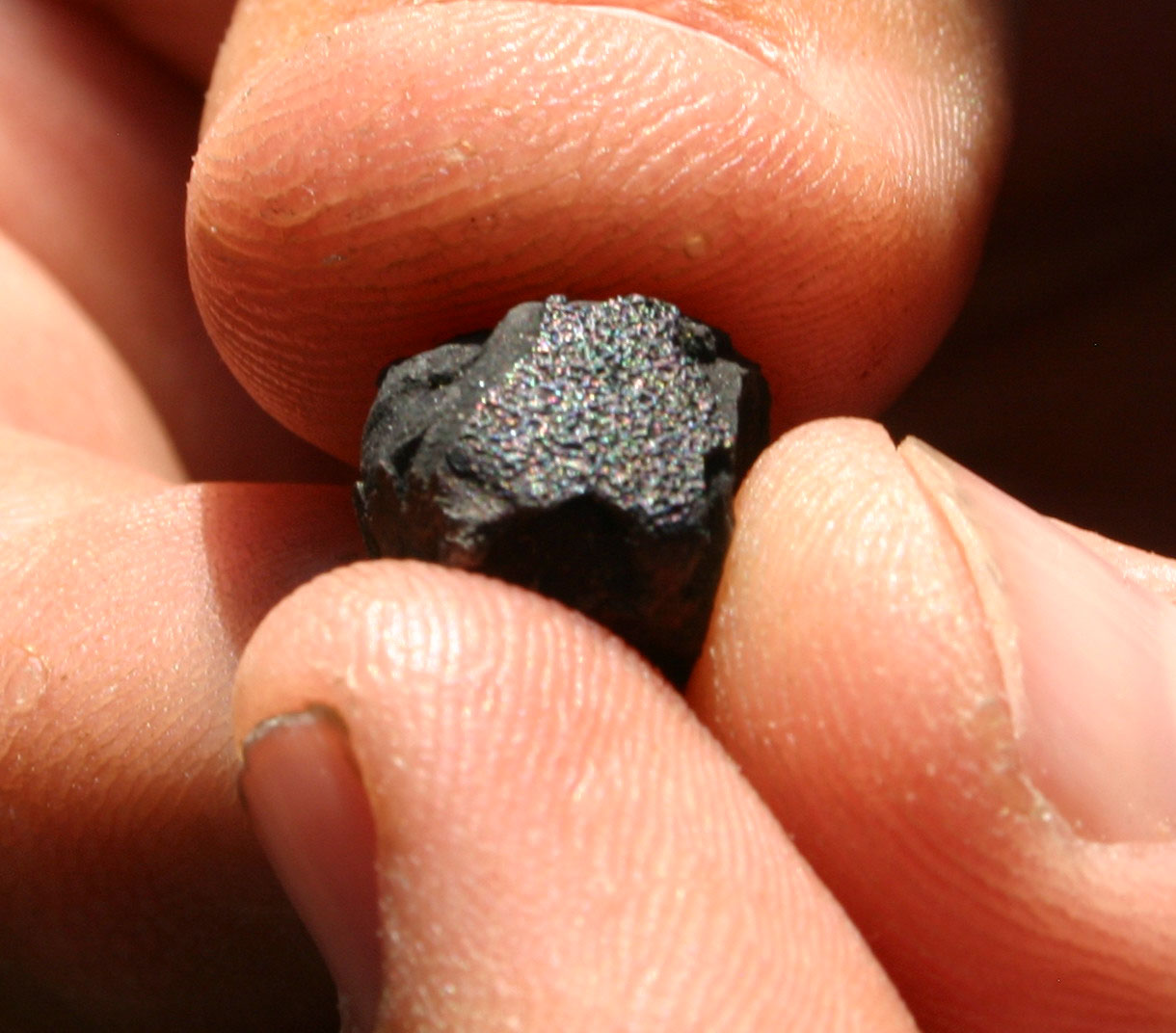
SM39 (2.5 g)

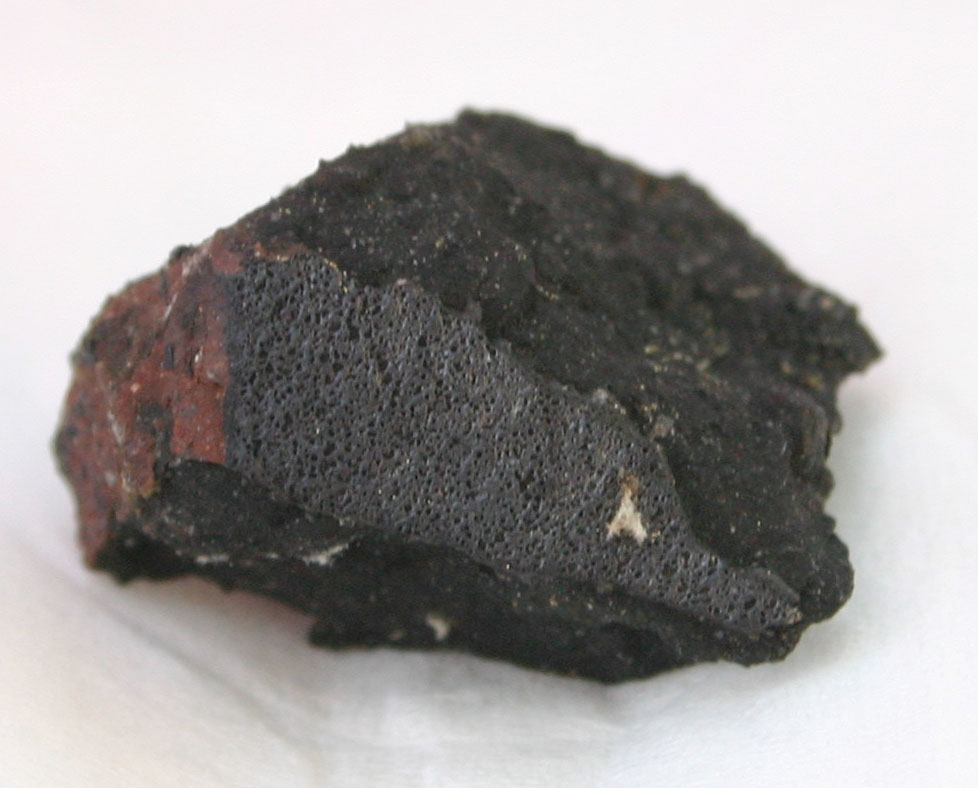
Mike Miller's SM49 (5.9 g)

== See also ==
- Glossary of meteoritics
