= Meteor air burst =

Atmospheric explosion of a meteor

NASA visualization and narration of the Chelyabinsk meteor air burst.

A meteor air burst is an air burst caused by a meteor exploding within a planetary body's atmosphere after entering, before actually colliding with the planetary surface (lithosphere or hydrosphere). It is a type of impact event that generates a measurable shock wave but does not leave behind any typical impact structure in the crust.

Aerodynamic heating causes meteors to become so-called fireballs or bolides, with the brightest ones known as superbolides. Such meteors were originally asteroids and comets of a few to several tens of meters in diameter, which separates them from the much smaller and far more common meteoroids that usually burn up quickly upon atmospheric entry as "shooting stars". Extremely bright fireballs traveling across the sky are often witnessed from a distance, such as the 1947 Sikhote-Alin meteor and the 2013 Chelyabinsk meteor. If the bolide is large and dense enough, it may survive long enough into the atmospheric entry to build up a spectacular mid-air explosion (i.e. air burst), or to impact the planetary surface as a meteorite and leave behind a distinct impact crater.

Prior to the 20th century, only a very small number of meteor air bursts were ever detected, and even fewer documented. The most powerful known meteor air burst in the modern era was the 1908 Tunguska event, during which a rocky meteoroid about 50–60 m (160–200 ft) in size exploded at an altitude of 5–10 km (16,000–33,000 ft) over a sparsely populated forest in the Podkamennaya Tunguska region of Central Siberia. The resulting shock wave flattened an estimated 30 million trees over a 2,150 km^{2} (830 sq mi) area, and may have killed 3 people. Modern developments in infrasound detection by the Comprehensive Nuclear-Test-Ban Treaty Organization and infrared Defense Support Program satellite technology have increased the likelihood of detecting meteor air bursts.

== Explanation ==
Meteors from outer space enter the Earth's atmosphere traveling at speeds of at least 11 km/s (24,610 mph) and often much faster. Despite moving through the rarified upper reaches of the atmosphere, the immense speed at which a meteor travels rapidly compresses the air in its path. The meteor then experiences what is known as ram pressure, as the air in front of the meteor is compressed. The temperature quickly rises not due to friction, rather due to an adiabatic process, a consequence of air molecules and atoms being forced to occupy a smaller space. Ram pressure and the resultant very high temperatures cause the meteor to become a fireball (bolide) that is visible from distance, and are the reason why few meteors make it all the way to the ground as meteorites, as most meteor simply burn up or are ablated into tiny fragments mid-flight. Larger or more solid meteors may instead explode in a spectacular airburst when enough energy has been accumulated and suddenly released after overcoming the strength of materials within the meteor.

=== Airburst explosions ===
The use of the term explosion is somewhat loose in this context, and can be confusing. This confusion is exacerbated by the tendency for airburst energies to be expressed in terms of nuclear weapon yields, as when the Tunguska event airburst is given a rating in megatons of TNT. Large meteoroids do not explode in the sense of chemical or nuclear explosives. Rather, at a critical moment in its atmospheric entry the enormous ram pressure experienced by the leading face of the meteoroid converts the body's immense momentum into a force blowing it apart over a nearly instantaneous span of time. That is, the mass of the meteoroid suddenly ceases to move at orbital speeds when it breaks up. Conservation of energy implies much of this orbital velocity is converted into heat.

In essence, the meteoroid is ripped apart by its own speed. This occurs when fine tendrils of superheated air force their way into cracks and faults in the leading face's surface. Once this high pressure plasma gains entry to the meteoroid's interior it exerts tremendous force on the body's internal structure. This occurs because the superheated air now exerts its pressure over a much larger surface area, as when the wind suddenly fills a sail. This sudden rise in the force exerted on the meteoroid overwhelms the body's structural integrity and it begins to break up. The breakup of the meteoroid yields an even larger total surface area for the superheated air to act upon and a cycle of amplification rapidly occurs. This is the explosion, and it causes the meteoroid to disintegrate with hypersonic velocity, a speed comparable to that of explosive detonation.

Air bursts have been recognized as a significant impact threat by the planetary defense community since at least 2010, when the National Academy of Sciences, citing Boslough and Crawford, recommended that "Because recent studies of meteor airbursts have suggested that near-Earth objects as small as 30 to 50 meters in diameter could be highly destructive, surveys should attempt to detect as many 30- to 50-meter-diameter objects as possible."

== Frequency ==
The table from Earth Impact Effects Program (EIEP) estimates the average frequency of airbursts and their energy yield in kilotons (kt) or megatons (Mt) of TNT equivalent.

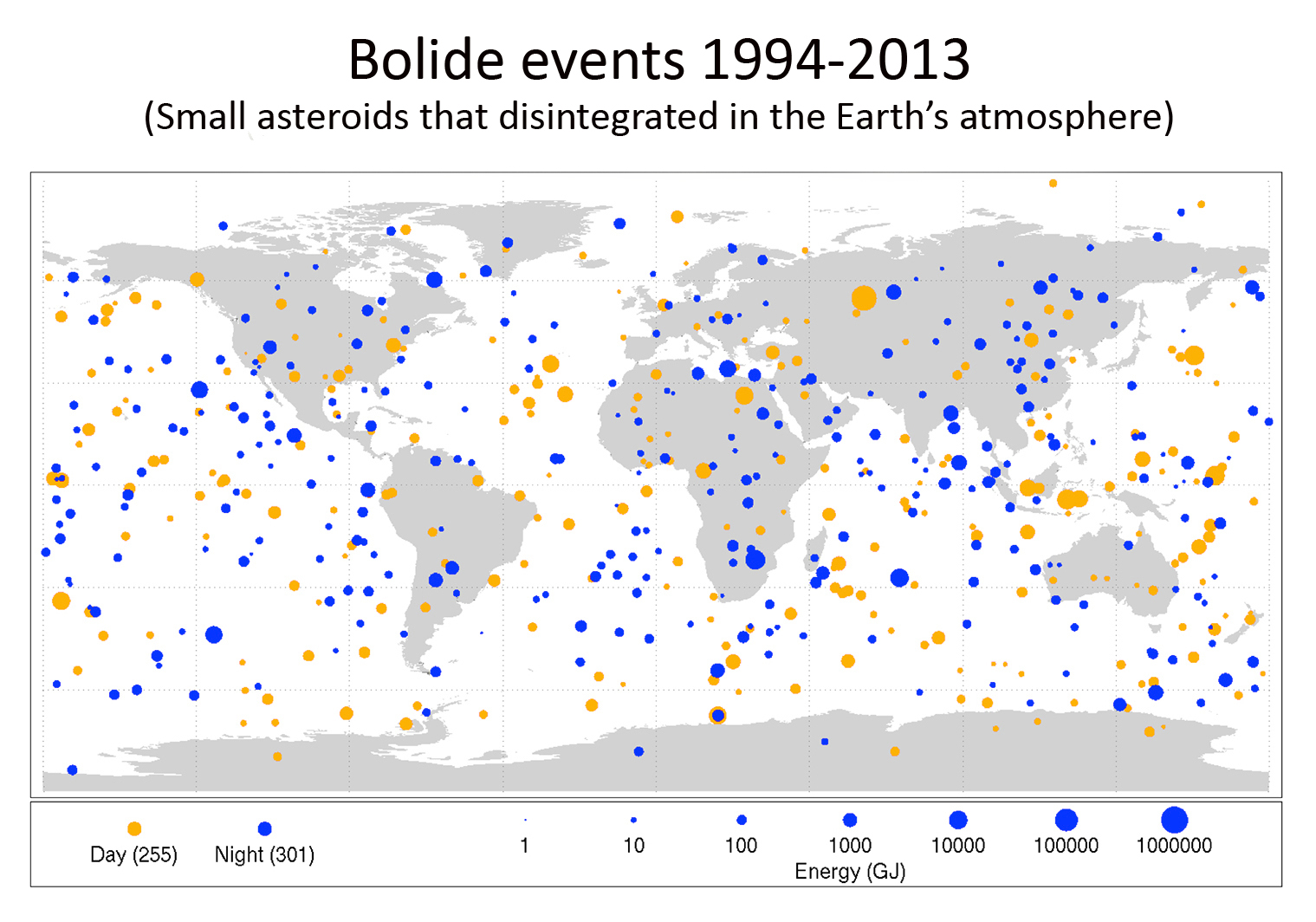
World map of bolide events (1994–2013)

Stony asteroid impacts that generate an airburst
Impactor diameter	Kinetic energy at		Airburst altitude	Average frequency (years)
Impactor diameter	atmospheric entry	airburst	Airburst altitude	Average frequency (years)
4 m (13 ft)	3 kt	0.75 kt	42.5 km (139,000 ft)	1.3
7 m (23 ft)	16 kt	5 kt	36.3 km (119,000 ft)	4.6
10 m (33 ft)	47 kt	19 kt	31.9 km (105,000 ft)	10
15 m (49 ft)	159 kt	82 kt	26.4 km (87,000 ft)	27
20 m (66 ft)	376 kt	230 kt	22.4 km (73,000 ft)	60
30 m (98 ft)	1.3 Mt	930 kt	16.5 km (54,000 ft)	185
50 m (160 ft)	5.9 Mt	5.2 Mt	8.7 km (29,000 ft)	764
70 m (230 ft)	16 Mt	15.2 Mt	3.6 km (12,000 ft)	1,900
Based on density of 2600 kg/m^{3}, speed of 17 km/s, and an impact angle of 45°

== Events ==
=== Before the 20th century ===
While airbursts undoubtedly happened prior to the 20th century, reliable reports of such are sparse. A possible example is the Qingyang event of 1490, which had an unknown energy yield but was reportedly powerful enough to cause 10,000 deaths. Modern researchers are sceptical about the figure, but had the Tunguska event occurred over a highly populous district, it might have caused a similar level of destruction.

A study published in 2020 claimed that on 22 August 1888, a meteorite killed a man and left another paralyzed in Sulaymaniyah, Iraq, as reported by the local governor to Sultan Abdul Hamid II of the Ottoman Empire.

=== After 1900 ===
Depending on the energy estimates, there were only 3–4 known airbursts in the years 1900–1999 with energy yield greater than 80 kilotons (in 1908, 1930?, 1932?, and 1963), slightly greater than the estimate of 3.8 in the EIEP table since airbursts over uninhabited land and ocean were not monitored before mid-century. However, the 1963 event may have not been a meteor but instead a nuclear test. Most values for the 1930 Curuçá River event put it well below 1 megaton, comparable to the Chelyabinsk meteor and Kamchatka superbolide. The Comprehensive Nuclear-Test-Ban Treaty Organization and modern technology have improved multiple detection of airbursts with energy yield 1–2 kilotons every year within the last decade.

The first airburst of the 21st century with yield greater than 100 kilotons came from the 2013 Chelyabinsk meteor, which had an estimated diameter of 20 metres.

Date	General:Specific Location	Coordinates	Energy (TNT equivalent)	Height of explosion	Notes
1908, Jun 30	Russia: 60 kilometres (37 mi) W-NW of Vanavara near Tunguska River	60°53′09″N 101°53′40″E	15,000 kilotonnes of TNT (63,000 TJ)	8.5 km (5.3 mi)	Tunguska event (Largest witnessed meteor airburst to date)
1919, Nov 26	United States: southern Michigan and northern Indiana	42°N 86°W			Known as the 1919 Michigan Event. A gigantic meteor was seen approaching from the east. A brilliant flash of light, thunder, and an earthquake lasting three minutes were reported. Damage to property over a large area as well as to telegraph, telephone and electrical systems.
1927, Jul 13	United States: Illinois	38°12′N 89°41′W		20 km (12 mi)	Tilden Meteor. From more than a hundred miles it appeared like "a piece falling off the sun." Then it exploded.
1930, Aug 13	South America: Curuçá River, Brazil	5°11′S 71°38′W	100 kilotonnes of TNT (420 TJ) ?		Also known as the 1930 Curuçá River event or "Brazilian Tunguska". Hypothesised to be generated by three meteor fragments. An astrobleme of 1 km was found on the ground, but may be related to an older feature.
1932, Dec 8	Europe: Arroyomolinos de León, Spain	38°01′00″N 6°25′00″W	190 kilotonnes of TNT (790 TJ) ?	15.7 km (9.8 mi)	Assumed to be produced by an 18-meter object and connected to the December delta-Arietids meteor shower.
1935, Dec 12	Guyana: near Maumauktpautau which is 24 km south of Marudi Mountain, south of the Rupununi region.	2°00′N 59°10′W			An exceptionally large meteor fall woke witnesses with a terrific roar, concussion and brilliant illumination. Shortly after a region of devastated forest perhaps ten miles by five was located, where trees large and small had been pushed over. The view must have been obtained from the top of Maumauktpautau. Other reports say that trees had been broken or twisted off 25 ft above their bases. An elongated damaged area more than 20 miles in extent was reported seen from an aircraft. A 1937 report says a 30-mile Path Cut By Meteor in Jungle and that the meteor fell, some ten miles from a place named Camshock. The only place near there was Davidson's cottage high on the side of Marudi Mountain.
1941, Apr 9	Russia: Ural Mountains, Katav-Ivanovo district of Chelyabinsk				ru:Катавский болид (Katavsky bolide). Residents saw a fireball flying at a high speed in the dark sky, followed by roaring like the sound of a speeding steam locomotive. Fragments were left as a result of the event.
1947, Feb 12	Russia: Sikhote-Alin Mountains in eastern Siberia	46°09′36″N 134°39′12″E	10 kilotonnes of TNT (42 TJ)		Sikhote-Alin bolide. The largest meteorite fall of recent times with total mass of fragments at 23 tons. A bright flash and a deafening sound were observed for 300 km. Estimated explosive yield of 10 kt equivalent.
1948, Feb 18	United States: Norton County, Kansas	39°41′N 99°52′W			Norton County bolide. One of the 5 largest meteorite falls of the 20th century, with more than 1 ton of fragments collected. A brilliant fireball appeared in the sky. Then there was a loud explosion as the meteor broke apart.
1959, Nov 24	Asia: Azerbaijan	38°56′N 48°15′E			Yardymly bolide. A bright object that illuminated the area for almost 3,000 square km before it shattered into pieces with a thunderous noise.
1963, Aug 3	Indian Ocean: about 1100 km west of the Prince Edward Islands	51°S 24°E	540–1,990 kilotonnes of TNT (2,300–8,300 TJ)		The Prince Edward Islands bolide was detected infrasonically about 1,100 km (680 mi) W-SW from the Prince Edward Islands off the coast of South Africa by a U.S. Government instrument network for detecting atmospheric explosions. The event "did not have independent confirmation from other techniques. It remains possible that this event was not a bolide but rather another source." Washington DC Nov 1963 "Despite those earlier denials, the Defense Department now concedes that a mysterious explosion in the Antarctic last August could have been a secret nuclear blast."
1965, Mar 31	Canada: Revelstoke, British Columbia	51.1°N 117.6°W	40–140 kilotonnes of TNT (170–590 TJ)	13 km (8 mi)	Revelstoke bolide. It exploded brilliantly and detonations were heard up to 130 km away. About 1 g of meteorite found. Sometimes placed in SE Canada on May 31.
1966, Sep 17	Canada: Lake Huron, Michigan, Ontario		0.6 kilotonnes of TNT (2.5 TJ)	13 km (8 mi)	The Kincardine fireball. A brilliant meteor illuminated the whole of SW Ontario.
1967, Feb 5	Canada: Vilna, Alberta		0.6 kilotonnes of TNT (2.5 TJ)	13 km (8 mi)	Vilna bolide. Photographed. Its detonation was also clearly recorded by the seismograph of the Univ. of Alberta. Two very small fragments < 1 g found and stored by the university.
1969, Feb 8	Mexico: Chihuahua	26°58′N 110°19′W			Allende bolide. The 3rd largest meteorite fall of the 20th century. A huge, brilliant fireball lit the sky and ground for hundreds of miles. It exploded and broke up. About 2 tons of fragments were later found.
1972, Apr 14	Indian Ocean	13°S 78°E	14 kilotonnes of TNT (59 TJ)		Infrasound detection.
1976, Mar 8	Asia: Jilin Province in China	43°42′N 126°12′E			Jilin bolide. The 2nd largest meteorite fall of the 20th century (after the Sikhote-Alin event). A fireball larger than the full moon was seen. There were several explosions then a violent breakup. It yielded a piece at 1770 kg, more than twice the Chelyabinsk meteorite (654 kg), and total fragments collected was about 4 tons.
1984, Feb 26	Russia: Chulym, Krasnoyarsk region	57.7°N 85.1°E	11 kilotonnes of TNT (46 TJ)		Chulym bolide explosion
1984, Apr 3	Africa: Nigeria	11°29′N 11°39′E			Gujba bolide. A bright object was witnessed then an explosion was heard. More than 100 kg of fragments were found.
1988, Apr 15	Southeast Asia: Banda Sea	4.1°S 124.3°E	14 kilotonnes of TNT (59 TJ)		
1993, Jan 19	Europe: Lugo, Italy	44.5°N 11.9°E	10 kilotonnes of TNT (42 TJ)	30 km	Superbolide airburst caused by the breakup of a low density meteoroid traveling at approximately 26 km/s.
1994, Jan 18	Europe: Cando, Spain	42°50′34.8″N 8°51′40.4″W	Much less than 1 kilotonne of TNT (4.2 TJ)		Cando event. An unexplained ground explosion at 7:15 UTC. Topsoil and large trees were thrown tens of metres away. No fragments found and there are problems with the trajectory. It might not be an impact event.
1994, Feb 1	Pacific Ocean: near the Marshall Islands	2.6°N 164.1°E	11 kilotonnes of TNT (46 TJ)	21–34 km (13–21 mi)	Marshall Islands fireball (about 9 ± 5 meters in diameter). Two fragments exploded at 34 km and 21 km of altitude. This impact was observed by space-based sensors both in infrared (by the DOD) and visible wavelength (by the DOE).
1997, Oct 10	United States: Las Cruces, New Mexico; El Paso, Texas	31°59′N 106°50′W	0.3 kilotonnes of TNT (1.3 TJ)	16–24 km (9.9–14.9 mi)	An airburst detected in El Paso and Las Cruces. The fireball traveled S-SE before disintegrating 10–15 miles above the surface with a loud explosion, traveling around 30,000 MPH. Luminosity is described only as "a very bright flash of light, bright orange-red, similar to a distant sunset".
1997, Dec 9	Europe: 150 km south of Nuuk, Greenland	62°54′N 50°06′W	0.1 kilotonnes of TNT (0.42 TJ)	25 km (16 mi)	One airburst at 46 km, three more breakups detected between 25 and 30 km. No remains found so far. Yield only based on luminosity, i.e. the total energy might have been considerably larger.
1998, June 20	Asia: Kunya-Urgench in Turkmenistan	42°15′N 59°12′E			Kunya-Urgench bolide. One of the 5 largest meteorite falls of the 20th century, with more than 1 ton of fragments collected. A large bolide brightened the sky, and a loud whistling then a crashing noise was heard.
1999, Nov 8	Europe: Northern Germany		1.5 kilotonnes of TNT (6.3 TJ)		Detected by the Deelen Infrasound Array in the Netherlands
2000, Jan 18	Canada: Yukon, BC	60°43′N 135°03′W	1.7 kilotonnes of TNT (7.1 TJ)	30 km	Tagish Lake bolide. One airburst at ~08:00, fragments recovered.
2001, Apr 23	Pacific Ocean; west of California	28°N 133.6°W	2–9 kilotonnes of TNT (8.4–37.7 TJ)	29 km	Infrasound detection. Meteor estimated to be 2–3 metres in diameter. Occurred 1,800 km west from the Scripps detector in San Diego.
2002, Jun 6	Mediterranean Sea: 230 km N-NE of Benghazi, Libya	34°N 21°E	12–26 kilotonnes of TNT (50–109 TJ)		2002 Eastern Mediterranean event
2002, Sep 25	Russia: Vitim River, near Bodaybo, Irkutsk Oblast	58.27°N 113.45°E	0.2–2 kilotonnes of TNT (0.84–8.37 TJ)	30 km	Vitim event or Bodaybo event
2003, Mar 26	United States: Park Forest, Illinois	41°29′N 87°41′W	0.5 kilotonnes of TNT (2.1 TJ)		Park Forest bolide. Residents in Illinois and neighboring states witnessed a bright meteor exploding overhead.
2003, Sep 27	Asia: Kendrapara in India	21°N 86.6°E	4.6 kilotonnes of TNT (19 TJ)	26 km (16 mi)	The Kendrapara bolide is notable as it may have caused injuries. A bright light then a loud noise that shattered windows. One part of the fireball fell in a village and may have set a hut on fire, injuring two people.
2004, Sep 3	Antarctic Ocean: north of Queen Maud Land	69°S 27°E	12 kilotonnes of TNT (50 TJ)	28–30 km (17–19 mi)	Asteroid 7–10 meters in diameter. Coordinates are for dust trail observed after event by NASA's Aqua satellite and LIDAR in Davis Station. Event was also observed by military satellites and infrasound stations.
2004, Oct 7	Indian Ocean	27.3°S 71.5°E	10–20 kilotonnes of TNT (42–84 TJ)		Infrasound detection
2005					Start of JPL Fireball and Bolide Reports. (Dates in yellow are not in the Jet Propulsion Laboratory reports.)
2005, Jan 1	Africa: Libya	32.7°N 12.4°E	1.2 kilotonnes of TNT (5.0 TJ)	31.8 km (19.8 mi)	Largest for 2005.
2006, Apr 4	Atlantic Ocean	26.6°N 26.6°W	5 kilotonnes of TNT (21 TJ)	25 km (16 mi)	
2006, Dec 9	Africa: Egypt	26.2°N 26.0°E	10–20 kilotonnes of TNT (42–84 TJ)	26.5 km (16.5 mi)	Infrasound detection
2007, Sep 28	Europe: Northern Ostrobothnia, Finland			40 km (25 mi)	Bolide that was observed as far as northern Lapland. Meteoritic material was suspected to have landed southeast of Oulu but none has been found.
2008, Oct 7	Africa: Nubian Desert, Sudan	20°48′00″N 32°12′00″E	1–2.1 kilotonnes of TNT (4.2–8.8 TJ)	37 km (23 mi)	2008 TC3, the first asteroid detected before impacting Earth. Fragment has been named as Almahata Sitta meteorite. In JPL as 1 kt.
2008, Nov 20	Canada: Saskatchewan	53.1°N 109.9°W	0.4 kilotonnes of TNT (1.7 TJ)	28.2 km (17.5 mi)	Buzzard Coulee bolide. Five times as bright as the full moon and broke apart before impact. Over 41 kg of fragments collected.
2009, Feb 7	Russia: Tyumen Oblast	56.6°N 69.8°E	3.5 kilotonnes of TNT (15 TJ)	40 km (25 mi)	
2009, Oct 8	Asia: coastal region in South Sulawesi, Indonesia	04°30′00″S 120°00′00″E	31–50 kilotonnes of TNT (130–210 TJ)	25 km (16 mi)	2009 Sulawesi superbolide. No meteoritic material found (most likely fell into the ocean). Occurred ~03:00 UTC; ~11:00 local time.
2009, Nov 21	Africa: South Africa / Zimbabwe	22.0°S 29.2°E	18 kilotonnes of TNT (75 TJ)	38 km (24 mi)	Impacted going 32.1 km/s (19.9 mi/s). There were 56 witnesses of the bolide and two seismic recorder detections.
2010, July 6	Pacific Ocean: NE of New Zealand	34.1°S 174.5°W	14 kilotonnes of TNT (59 TJ)	26 km (16 mi)	
2010, Sep 3	Pacific Ocean	61.0°S 146.7°E	3.8 kilotonnes of TNT (16 TJ)	33.3 km (20.7 mi)	
2010, Dec 25	Pacific Ocean: east of Japan	38.0°N 158.0°E	33 kilotonnes of TNT (140 TJ)	26 km (16 mi)	
2011, May 25	Africa: Cameroon	4.1°N 14.0°E	4.8 kilotonnes of TNT (20 TJ)	59 km (37 mi)	
2012, Apr 22	United States: California and Nevada	37°6′N 120°5′W	4 kilotonnes of TNT (17 TJ)	30–47 km	Sutter's Mill meteorite. Numerous fragments from object recovered. (Not in JPL reports.)
2013, Jan 25	Canada: Quebec	60.3°N 64.6°W	6.9 kilotonnes of TNT (29 TJ)	–	
2013, Feb 15	Russia: Chebarkul	54°30′N 61°30′E	500 kilotonnes of TNT (2,100 TJ)	Estimated 30–50 km	Chelyabinsk meteor, about ~20 meters in diameter. Largest meteor airburst known since Tunguska in 1908. More than a ton of fragments found, one large piece called the Chelyabinsk meteorite.
2013, Apr 21	South America: Argentina	28.1°S 64.6°W	2.5 kilotonnes of TNT (10 TJ)	40.7 km (25.3 mi)	The bolide was captured on video at a Los Tekis rock concert.
2013, Apr 30	Atlantic Ocean: SW of the Azores	35.5°N 30.7°W	10 kilotonnes of TNT (42 TJ)	21.2 km (13.2 mi)	Asteroid impact at a low 12.1 km/s
2013, Oct 12	Atlantic Ocean	19.1°S 25.0°W	3.5 kilotonnes of TNT (15 TJ)	22 km (14 mi)	
2013, Nov 26	Canada: heard in Montreal, Ottawa, and New York		0.10 kilotonnes of TNT (0.42 TJ)		Montreal bolide.
2014, Jan 8	Pacific Ocean; north of Papua New Guinea	1.3°S 147.6°E	0.11 kilotonnes of TNT (0.46 TJ)	18.7 km	Potentially interstellar originating from an unbound hyperbolic orbit based on an eccentricity of 2.4, an inclination of 10°, and a speed of 43.8 km/s when outside of the Solar System. This would make it notably faster than ʻOumuamua which was 26.3 km/s when outside the Solar System. The meteor is estimated to have been 0.9 meters in diameter.
2014, Feb 18	South America: Argentina	32.8°S 61.5°W	0.1 kilotonnes of TNT (0.42 TJ)	–	Even though this was a low-energy event, there were reports of windows and buildings shaking.
2014, Aug 23	Antarctic Ocean	61.7°S 132.6°E	7.6 kilotonnes of TNT (32 TJ)	22.2 km (13.8 mi)	
2015, Jul 4	China	38.6°N 103.1°E	0.18 kilotonnes of TNT (0.75 TJ)	46.3 km (28.8 mi)	Head-on collision at 49 km/s (180,000 km/h). Fastest collision in the CNEOS Fireball and Bolide database.
2015, Sep 7	Asia: Bangkok, Thailand	14.5°N 98.9°E	3.9 kilotonnes of TNT (16 TJ)	29.3 km (18.2 mi)	The 2015 Thailand meteor daylight bolide around 08:40 local time (UTC+7). Caught on at least 9 videos of dash and helmet cams online
2015, Nov 13	Asia: India	16.0°N 124.3°E	0.3 kilotonnes of TNT (1.3 TJ)	28.0 km (17.4 mi)	Komar Gaon bolide. A daylight meteor accompanied by almost a minute of sonic booms.
2015, Dec 12	Asia: eastern Turkey	39.1°N 40.2°E	0.13 kilotonnes of TNT (0.54 TJ)	39.8 km (24.7 mi)	Sariçiçek meteorite. A bright fireball was seen and then heard as it exploded over a Turkish village. More than 15 kg of fragments were found and villagers made an est. $300,000 selling the space rocks.
2016, Feb 6	Atlantic Ocean: NW of Tristan da Cunha island	30.4°S 25.5°W	13 kilotonnes of TNT (54 TJ)	31 km (19 mi)	Largest fireball for 2016.
2016, May 17	United States: NE coast	44.4°N 71.2°W			Many eyewitnesses, and some heard a sonic boom.
2017, Nov 16	Europe: Inari, Finland	69.1°N 28.6°E		20–91 km	A meteoroid weighing a few hundred kg exploded in an airburst and dropped tens of kg of meteorites into a remote area of Finnish Lapland. The resulting shockwave was felt on the surface. The event was detected by 7 infrasound stations.
2017, Dec 15	Russia: Kamchatka	60.2°N 170.0°E	6.4 kilotonnes of TNT (27 TJ)	20 km (12 mi)	The asteroid likely had a diameter of 2–5 meters prior to impact. But because it happened in a remote area in Kamchatka, there were likely no eyewitnesses. The event was detected at 11 CTBTO infrasound stations.
2018, Jan 22	Atlantic Ocean: off Senegal's coast	14.0°N 17.4°W	0.11 kilotonnes of TNT (0.46 TJ)		Not related to ATLAS detected object A106fgF that had an impact track well south of Senegal.
2018, Jun 21	Russia: Kursk Oblast	52.8°N 38.1°E	2.8 kilotonnes of TNT (12 TJ)	27.2 km (16.9 mi)	Loud sonic booms were reported as well as fragments found.
2018, Dec 18	Bering Sea, near Kamchatka, Russia	56.9°N 172.4°E	173 kilotonnes of TNT (720 TJ)	25.6 km (15.9 mi)	Kamchatka superbolide asteroid (~10 meters in diameter) impacting at a fast 32 km/s. Largest airburst since Chelyabinsk.
2019, Feb 18	Africa: Zambia	15.5°S 25.3°E	4.2 kilotonnes of TNT (18 TJ)	26 km (16 mi)	
2019, June 22	Caribbean Sea	14.9°N 66.2°W	6 kilotonnes of TNT (25 TJ)	25 km (16 mi)	2019 MO (~3 meters in diameter) seen by ATLAS 12 hours before impact.
2020, December 22	Qinghai, China	31.9°N 96.2°E	9.5 kilotonnes of TNT (40 TJ)	35.5 km (22.1 mi)	Asteroid (~8 meters in diameter) impacting at a relatively slow 13.6 km/s. Largest known impact since 2018 December 18.

After 2005, but not in JPL reports.

Note: For sorting purposes, location is given in "general:specific" format. For example, "Europe: Spain". This table contains a chronological list of events with a large yield at least 3 kilotons since 2005, with earlier or smaller events included if widely covered in the media.

=== Airbursts per year ===
As of January 2026, the number of airbursts each year since 2005, as reported in the JPL Fireball and Bolide Reports are:

Year	Number of airbursts
2025	32
2024	32
2023	36
2022	42
2021	32
2020	41
2019	42
2018	39
2017	26
2016	29
2015	43
2014	33
2013	20
2012	31
2011	23
2010	32
2009	25
2008	27
2007	21
2006	32
2005	38
Total:	747

On average 32.2 airbursts are recorded each year, with an average energy of 1.27kt per event, 40.5kt per year, and an estimated total of 950.2kt of energy since 2005. Of note is that when excluding Chelyabinsk, that number falls to 0.68kt per event, 24.2kt per year, and 509.2kt of total energy. Chelyabinsk thus constitutes 46.3% of all airburst energy since 2005.

== See also ==
- 1972 Great Daylight Fireball – assumed to be still in an Earth-crossing orbit
- 2007 Carancas impact event – mostly intact until object hit the ground
- Impact event
- Asteroid impact prediction
- Meteorite fall
- List of bolides
