= Michigan Academy of Science, Arts, and Letters =

Learned society and academic organization

- Abbreviation: MASAL
- Formation: 1894
- Type: Learned society
- Legal status: Nonprofit
- Purpose: Supporting research and disseminating knowledge in sciences, humanities, and social sciences
- Headquarters: Alma College
- Location: Michigan, United States
- Members: Faculty and graduate students from Michigan institutions, independent researchers, scholars from other states
- Main organ: Michigan Academician (quarterly journal)
- Affiliations: American Association for the Advancement of Science
- Website: Official Website

== Overview ==
The Michigan Academy of Science, Arts, and Letters (MASAL) is an learned society and academic organization that supports research and disseminating knowledge through various scholarly activities. The Academy has a mission to advance scientific research and knowledge, support scientific literacy, and promote science-based solutions. It is housed at Alma College in Michigan. MASAL is affiliated with the American Association for the Advancement of Science (AAAS).

== History ==
Established in 1894, is one the oldest state academies. Housed at Alma College, the Academy is an IRS designated 501 (c)(3) non-profit organization that is distinct among scholarly organizations for the range of disciplines (over 30) offered.

The organization met yearly in Lansing, East Lansing or Ann Arbor, with the stated purpose of reading and discussing scientific papers and “to forward the scientific [study of the] resources of the state…” Charter members regularly advised the State of Michigan on matters ranging from conservation and the preservation of natural species to map making. In 1921, the Academy became “The Michigan Academy of Science, Arts, and Letters,” and within months, the Academy blossomed with several new sections devoted to humanities disciplines and the organization took on the interdisciplinary character that it retains to this day. (Note: only two other state academies include the humanities disciplines.)

Today, the Academy is located at Alma College and is funded primarily from individual and institutional membership fees. Conference registration fees, journal subscriptions and royalties also provide financial support. In 1998, the Academy received a small endowment from Judge Avern Cohn for a prize for the most outstanding paper presented on the topic of law and public policy.

=== Founding ===
The Academy was founded by Professors Frederick Charles Newcombe, Joseph Beal Steere, and Warren Plimpton Lombard, who called a meeting to organize a society to coordinate scientific research and improve teaching methods in natural sciences.

== Activities ==
MASAL's primary activities include organizing an annual regional academic conference and publishing the Michigan Academician, a quarterly academic journal.

=== Annual Conference ===
The annual conference, typically held in March, serves as a hub for intellectual exchange and collaboration, with each year a different member institution hosting the event.

=== Journal Publication ===
The Michigan Academician journal features papers in the sciences, humanities, and social sciences.

== Administration and Governance ==
The Academy is administered by a council consisting of executive officers, section chairmen, standing committees' chairmen, and past presidents.

=== Executive Committee ===
The Executive Committee includes positions such as President, President-Elect, Past President, Treasurer, Secretary, representatives from Alma College, and members-at-large.

== Funding ==
The Academy is funded primarily from individual and institutional membership fees. Conference registration fees, journal subscriptions and royalties also provide financial support.

In 1998, the Academy received a small endowment from Judge Avern Cohn for a prize for the most outstanding paper presented on the topic of law and public policy.

== Affiliated Institutions ==
Adrian College

Alma College

Andrews University

Aquinas College

Calvin University

Central Michigan University

Concordia University Ann Arbor

Cornerstone University

Eastern Michigan University

Glen Oaks Community College

Grace Christian University

Grand Valley State University

Hope College

Kalamazoo College

Kettering University

Lake Superior State University

Lawrence Technological University

Macomb Community College

Madonna University

Michigan State University

Montcalm Community College

Northern Michigan University

Northwood University

Oakland Community College

Oakland University

Olivet College

Saginaw Valley State University

Schoolcraft College

Spring Arbor University

University of Detroit Mercy

University of Michigan–Flint

Wayne State University

Western Michigan University
