= 2009 Sulawesi superbolide =

Atmospheric fireball blast over Indonesia

2009 Sulawesi superbolide

The 2009 Sulawesi superbolide was a meteor airburst event over Indonesia on October 8, 2009, at 2:57 UTC (10:57 AM local time), near the coastal city of Watampone in South Sulawesi. The meteoritic impactor broke up at an estimated height of 15–20 km. The impact energy of the bolide was estimated in the 8 to 67 kiloton TNT equivalent range, with the higher end of this range being more likely (50 kT). The likely size of the impactor was 6–10 metres (20–33 ft) m diameter.

The meteor's explosion resulted in audible booms and thunderous sounds that shook the ground. It left a thick cloud of smoke.

The bolide resulted in an indirect death – a 9 year old girl with a pre-existing heart condition had suffered a fatal cardiac arrest, most likely due to intense fear from loud booms caused by meteoroid's supersonic speed.

Comparison of approximate sizes of notable impactors with the Hoba meteorite, a Boeing 747 and a New Routemaster bus
