= Peekskill meteorite =

Meteorite which landed in Peekskill, New York, United States in 1992

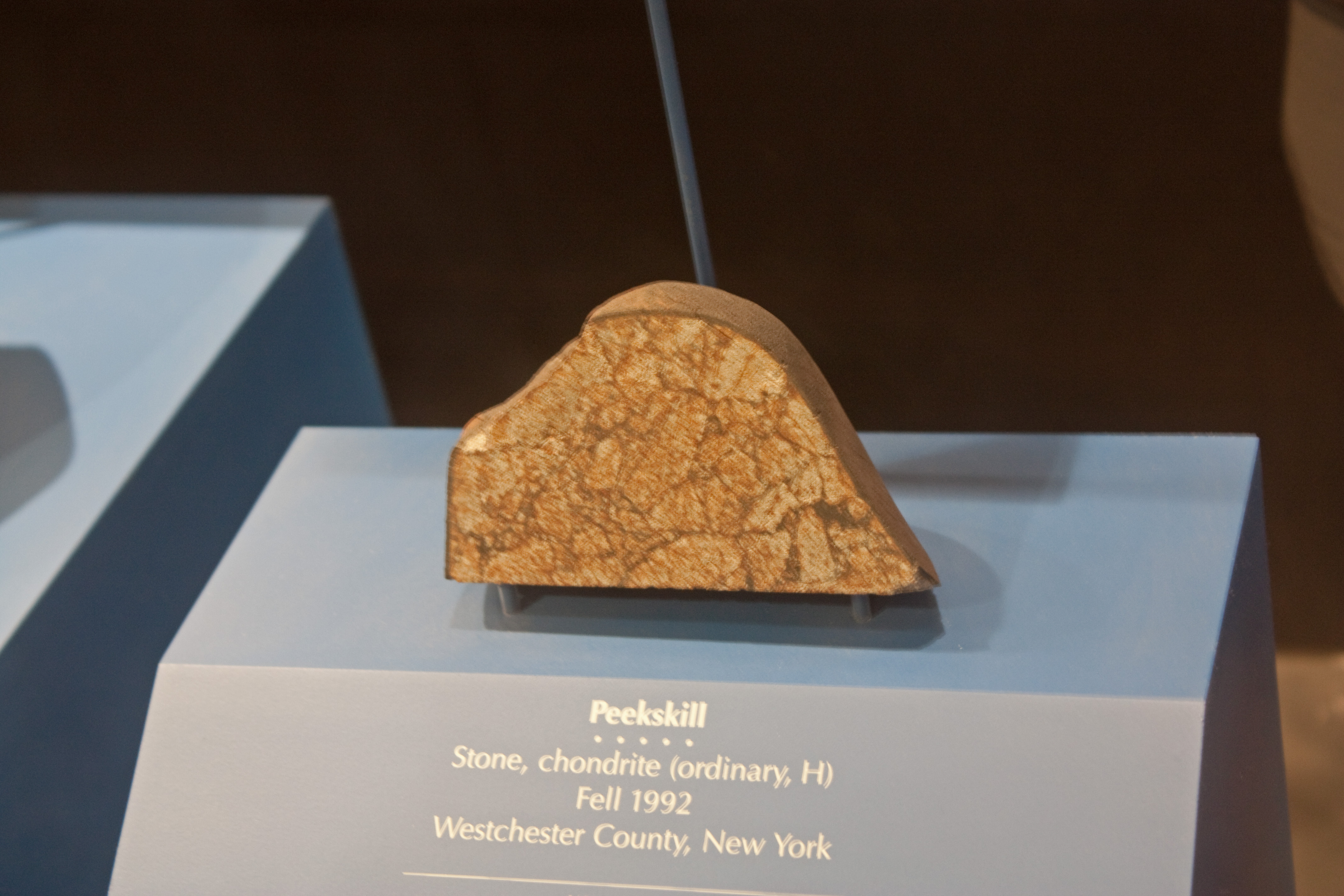
- Portion of the meteorite in the National Museum of Natural History
- Type: Stony-iron
- Class: H6
- Group: Monomict breccia
- Composition: 20% nickel-iron
- Country: United States
- Region: Peekskill, New York
- Coordinates: 41°17′11″N 73°54′59″W
- Observed fall: Yes
- Fall date: October 9, 1992
- TKW: 12.57 kilograms (27.7 lb)
- Related media on Wikimedia Commons

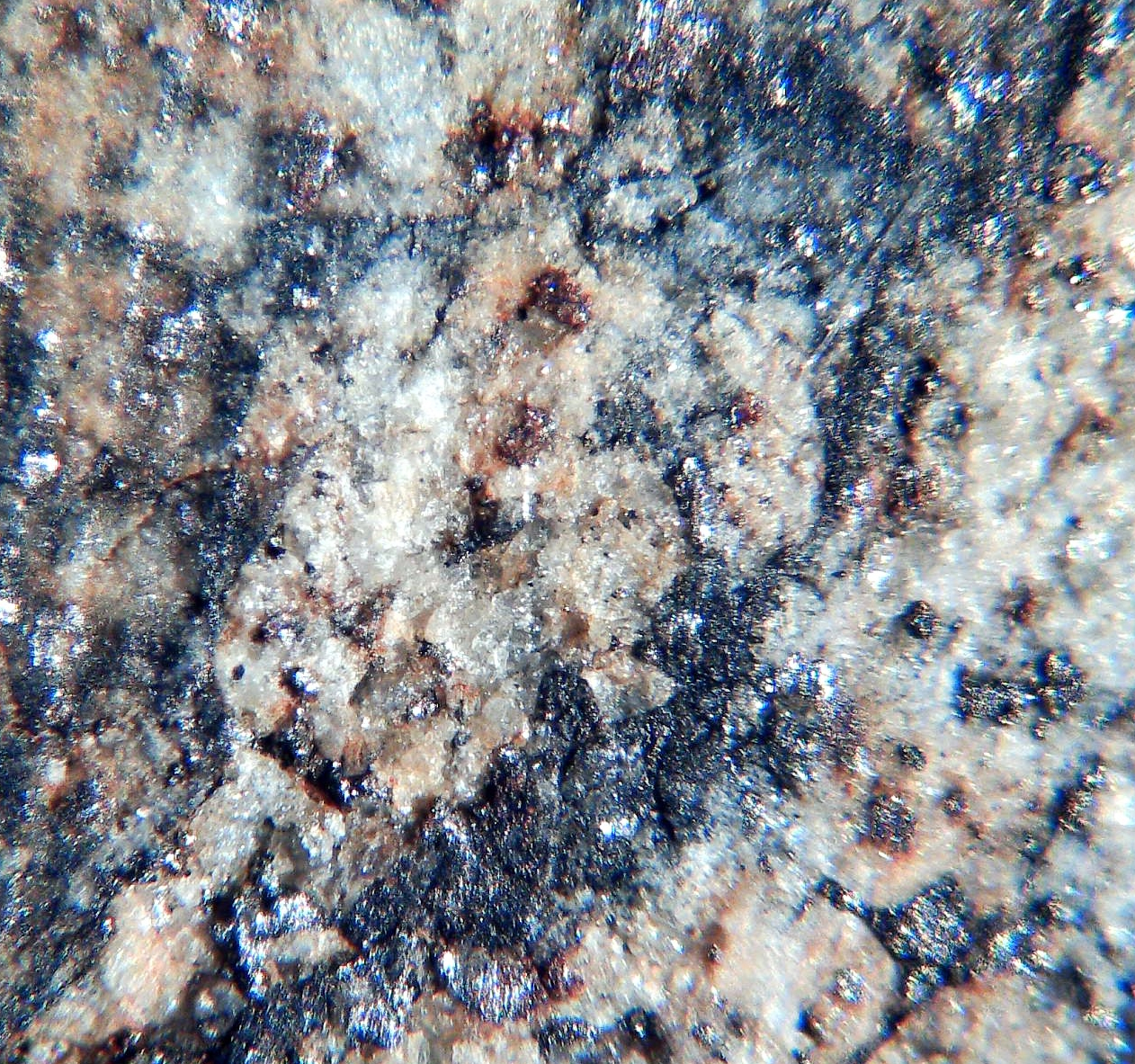
Peekskill meteorite slice observed under a microscope at 40x magnification. Max Rouger Collection.

The Peekskill meteorite is the object resulting from a well-documented meteorite event that occurred in October 1992, in Peekskill, New York, United States. Sixteen separate video recordings document the meteorite burning through the Earth's atmosphere, whereupon it struck a parked car in Peekskill. The Peekskill meteorite is an H6 monomict breccia; its filigreed texture is the result of the shocking and heating following the impact of two asteroids in outer space. The meteorite is of the stony variety, and approximately 20% of its mass is tiny flakes of nickel-iron. When it struck Earth, the meteorite weighed 12.57 kilograms (27 lb 11 oz) and measured 1 foot (30 cm) in diameter. The Peekskill meteorite is estimated to be 4.4 billion years old.

== Descent ==
The meteorite fell on October 9, 1992 – an event witnessed by thousands across the East Coast. Numerous residents of Pittsburgh, Philadelphia, and Washington D.C. described the "huge greenish fireball." The meteorite broke up over Kentucky and passed over West Virginia and Pennsylvania on its north-northeast trajectory before striking a parked 1980 red Chevy Malibu at approximately 7:50 pm EDT. After traveling through space at a cosmic velocity of 14.2 km/s (31,760 mph; 51,120 km/h), the meteorite at impact had slowed to 164 mph (241 ft/s; 264 km/h; 73 m/s)

== Video ==
As the meteorite fell on a Friday evening, its descent was captured on video by many high school football fans taping local games. The descent was filmed by 16 different cameras. Only a handful of meteorite falls have been caught on film, and only the 2013 Russian meteor event was captured from more angles and localities. The multiple perspectives provided scientists with the ability to calculate the meteorite's flight path to Earth.

== Impact ==
After having been slowed by the Earth's atmosphere, the meteorite was traveling at approximately 164 miles per hour (264 km/h) at impact. The Peekskill meteorite smashed through the trunk of a red 1980 Chevrolet Malibu and narrowly missed the gas tank, finally coming to rest in an impact pit beneath the car. Seventeen-year-old Michelle Knapp, the car's owner, heard the collision from inside her home. She later described the sound as "like a three-car crash". Hurrying outside to investigate the noise, Knapp found her car smashed and the meteorite weighing 12.37 kilograms (27 lb 4.3 oz), still warm and smelling of sulfur, beneath it.

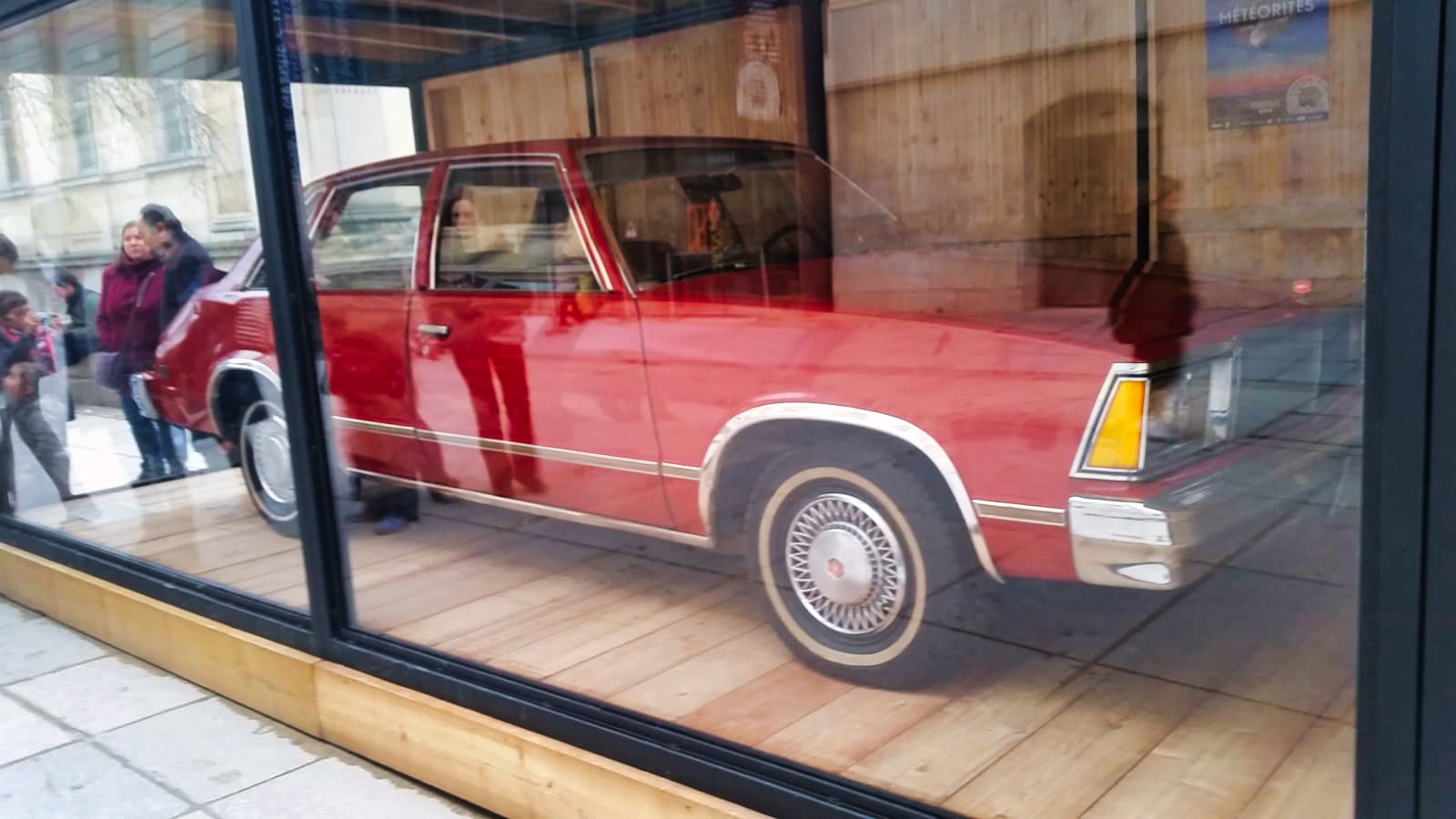
Car of Michelle Knapp hit by a meteorite 1992 in Peekskill, and displayed in Paris.

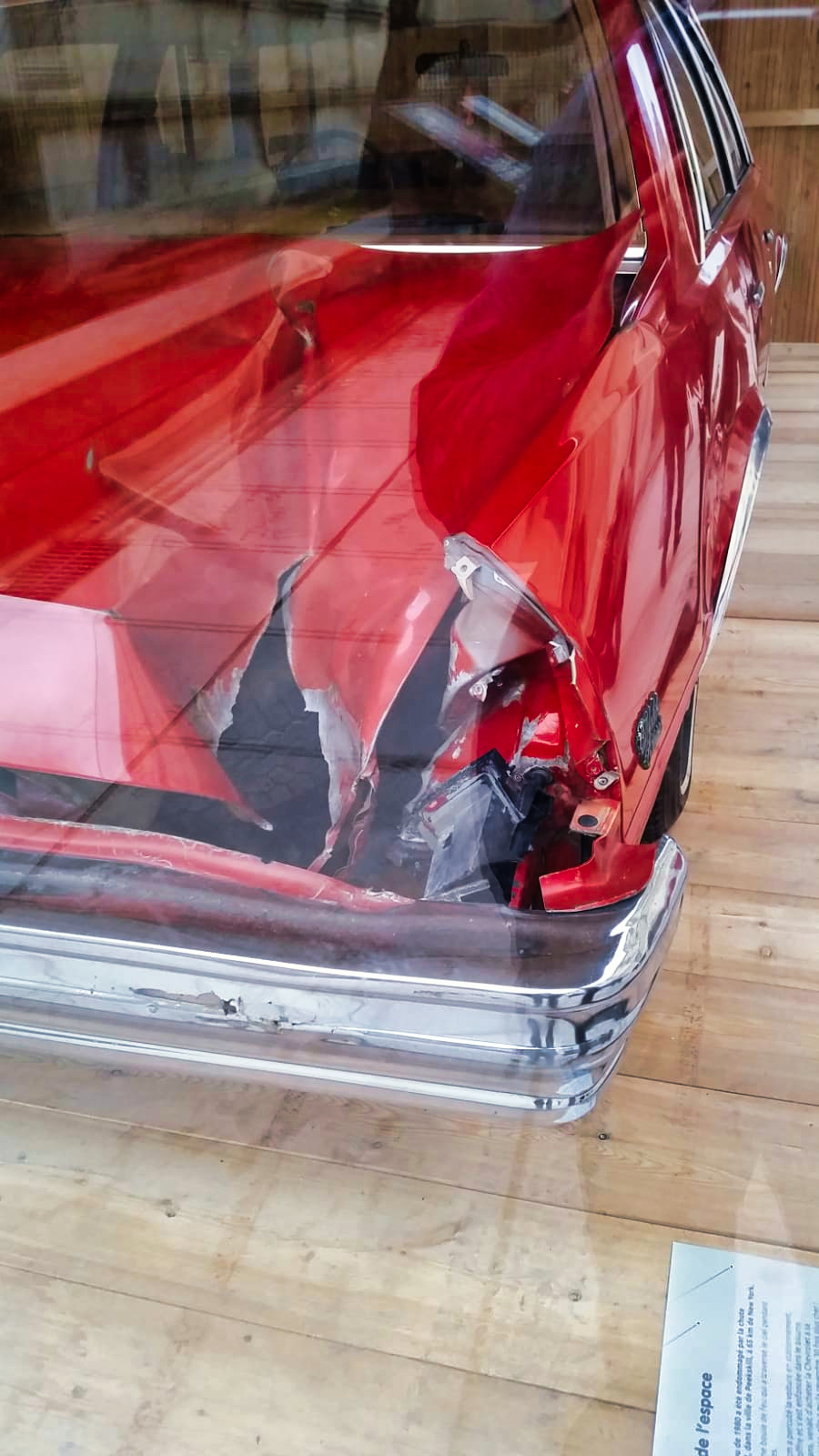
Car of Michelle Knapp hit by a meteorite 1992 in Peekskill, and displayed in Paris.

== Specimens ==
Knapp retrieved the meteorite, after which it was sold to a consortium of three dealers for $50,000. Today, small specimens of the Peekskill meteorite sell for approximately $125 per gram.

Knapp had just purchased the car for $300. Immediately following the extraterrestrial impact, the vehicle was sold to Iris Lang, wife of renowned meteorite collector and dealer Al Lang, for $25,000. Since then, it has been on display in numerous museums throughout the world, including New York City's American Museum of Natural History and France's National Museum of Natural History.

The car, as well as the main mass of the meteorite (which currently weighs 890 grams (1 lb 15 oz)), are now in the Macovich Collection of Meteorites. Additional specimens of the meteorite can be found in Chicago's Field Museum, the National Museum of American History at the Smithsonian, and Griffith Observatory in Los Angeles.

== See also ==
- Glossary of meteoritics
- Tunguska event
- Chelyabinsk meteor
- Potentially hazardous asteroid
- Near Earth object
- Impact event
