= Meteor =

Body that enters the Earth's atmosphere

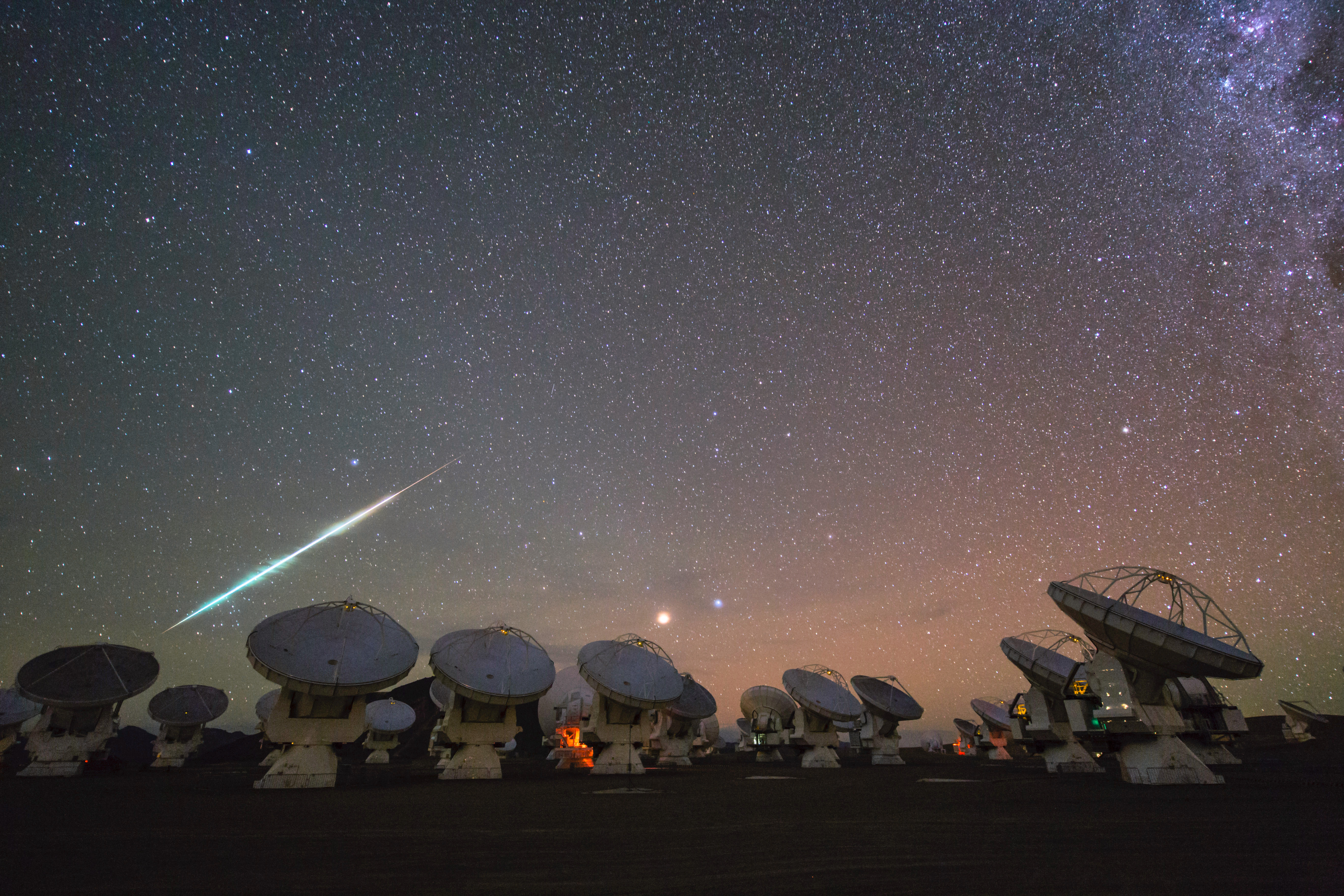
Meteor seen from the site of the Atacama Large Millimeter Array (ALMA)

A meteor, known colloquially as a shooting star, is a glowing streak of a small body (usually meteoroid) going through Earth's atmosphere, after being heated to incandescence by collisions with air molecules in the upper atmosphere, creating a streak of light via its rapid motion and sometimes also by shedding glowing material in its wake. Meteors typically occur in the mesosphere at altitudes from 76–100 kilometres (47–62 miles). The root word meteor comes from the Greek μετεωρίτης (meteōrítēs), meaning "high in the air".

Millions of meteors occur in Earth's atmosphere daily. Most meteoroids that cause meteors are about the size of a grain of sand, i.e. they are usually 1 mm (1/25 in) or smaller. Meteoroid sizes can be calculated from their mass and density which, in turn, can be estimated from the observed meteor trajectory in the upper atmosphere. Meteors may occur in showers, which arise when Earth passes through a stream of debris left by a comet, or as "random" or "sporadic" meteors, not associated with a specific stream of space debris. A number of specific meteors have been observed, largely by members of the public and largely by accident, but with enough detail that orbits of the meteoroids producing the meteors have been calculated. The atmospheric velocities of meteors result from the movement of Earth around the Sun at about 30 km/s (67,000 mph; 110,000 km/h), the orbital speeds of meteoroids, and the gravity well of Earth.

Meteors become visible between about 75 to 120 km (47 to 75 mi) above Earth. They usually disintegrate at altitudes of 50 to 95 km (31 to 59 mi). Meteors have roughly a fifty percent chance of a daylight (or near daylight) collision with Earth. Most meteors are, however, observed at night, when darkness allows fainter objects to be recognized. For bodies with a size scale larger than 10 cm (4 in) to several meters meteor visibility is due to the atmospheric ram pressure (not friction) that heats the meteoroid so that it glows and creates a shining trail of gases and melted meteoroid particles. The gases include vaporised meteoroid material and atmospheric gases that heat up when the meteoroid passes through the atmosphere. Most meteors glow for about a second.

== History ==
Meteors were not known to be an astronomical phenomenon until early in the nineteenth century. Before that, they were seen in the West as an atmospheric phenomenon, like lightning, and were not connected with strange stories of rocks falling from the sky. In 1807, Yale University chemistry professor Benjamin Silliman investigated a meteorite that fell in Weston, Connecticut. Silliman believed the meteor had a cosmic origin, but meteors did not attract much attention from astronomers until the spectacular meteor storm of November 1833. People all across the eastern United States saw thousands of meteors, radiating from a single point in the sky. Careful observers noticed that the radiant, as the point is called, moved with the stars, staying in the constellation Leo.

The astronomer Denison Olmsted extensively studied this storm, concluding that it had a cosmic origin. After reviewing historical records, Heinrich Wilhelm Matthias Olbers predicted the storm's return in 1867, drawing other astronomers' attention to the phenomenon. Hubert A. Newton's more thorough historical work led to a refined prediction of 1866, which proved correct. With Giovanni Schiaparelli's success in connecting the Leonids (as they are called) with comet Tempel-Tuttle, the cosmic origin of meteors was firmly established. Still, they remain an atmospheric phenomenon and retain their name "meteor" from the Greek word for "atmospheric".

== Fireball ==
Camera recording of a superbolide passage above Chelyabinsk Oblast, Russia on 15th February 2013. The object in this video is estimated to be 17 to 20 metres (56 to 66 ft) in diameter before atmospheric entry.

A fireball is a brighter-than-usual meteor which can be also seen during daylight. The International Astronomical Union (IAU) defines a fireball as "a meteor brighter than any of the planets" (apparent magnitude −4 or greater). The International Meteor Organization (an amateur organization that studies meteors) has a more rigid definition. It defines a fireball as a meteor that would have at least magnitude of −3 if seen at zenith. This definition corrects for the greater distance between an observer and a meteor near the horizon. For example, a meteor of magnitude −1 at 5 degrees above the horizon would be classified as a fireball because, if the observer had been directly below the meteor, it would have appeared as magnitude −6.

Fireballs reaching apparent magnitude −14 or brighter are called bolides. The IAU has no official definition of "bolide", and generally considers the term synonymous with "fireball". Astronomers often use "bolide" to identify an exceptionally bright fireball, particularly one that explodes in a meteor air burst. They are sometimes called detonating fireballs. It may also be used to mean a fireball which creates audible sounds. In the late twentieth century, bolide has also come to mean any object that hits Earth and explodes, with no regard to its composition (asteroid or comet). The word bolide comes from the Greek βολίς (bolis) which can mean a missile or to flash. If the magnitude of a bolide reaches −17 or brighter it is known as a superbolide. A relatively small percentage of fireballs hit Earth's atmosphere and then pass out again: these are termed Earth-grazing fireballs. Such an event happened in broad daylight over North America in 1972. Another rare phenomenon is a meteor procession, where the meteor breaks up into several fireballs traveling nearly parallel to the surface of Earth.

A steadily growing number of fireballs are recorded at the American Meteor Society every year. There are several thousand fireballs a day, but most go unnoticed because most occur over the ocean and half occur during daytime. A European Fireball Network and a NASA All-sky Fireball Network detect and track many fireballs.

Fireball Sightings reported to the American Meteor Society
Year	2008	2009	2010	2011	2012	2013	2014	2015	2016	2017	2018	2019	2020	2021
Number	734	676	953	1,660	2,183	3,599	3,789	4,250	5,391	5,510	5,993	6,978	8,259	9,629

== Effect on atmosphere ==
A meteoroid of the Perseids with a size of about 1 cm (3/8 in) entering the earth's atmosphere in real time. The meteoroid is at the bright head of the trail, and the ionisation of the mesosphere is still visible in the tail.

The entry of meteoroids into Earth's atmosphere produces three main effects: ionization of atmospheric molecules, dust that the meteoroid sheds, and the sound of passage. During the entry of a meteoroid or asteroid into the upper atmosphere, an ionization trail is created, where the air molecules are ionized by the passage of the meteor. Such ionization trails can last up to 45 minutes at a time.

Small, sand-grain sized meteoroids are entering the atmosphere constantly, essentially every few seconds in any given region of the atmosphere, and thus ionization trails can be found in the upper atmosphere more or less continuously. When radio waves are bounced off these trails, it is called meteor burst communications. Meteor radars can measure atmospheric density and winds by measuring the decay rate and Doppler shift of a meteor trail. Most meteoroids burn up when they enter the atmosphere. The left-over debris is called meteoric dust or just meteor dust. Meteor dust particles can persist in the atmosphere for up to several months. These particles might affect climate, both by scattering electromagnetic radiation and by catalyzing chemical reactions in the upper atmosphere.

Meteoroids or their fragments enter a phase called dark flight after deceleration to terminal velocity when they are no longer emitting visible light. Dark flight starts when they decelerate to about 2–4 km/s (4,500–8,900 mph; 1.2–2.5 mi/s; 7,200–14,400 km/h). Larger fragments fall further down the strewn field.

=== Colours ===
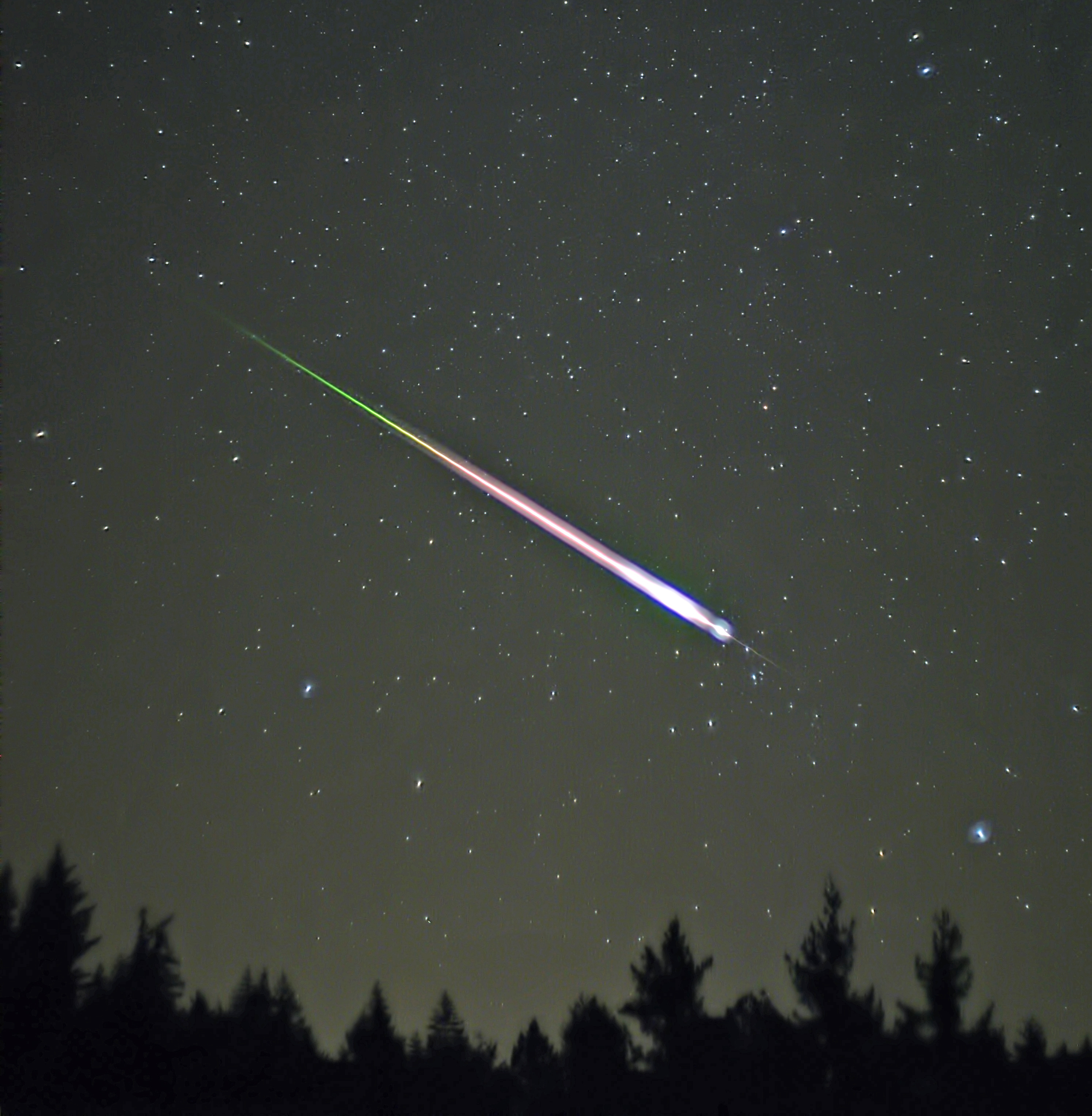
A meteor of the Leonid meteor shower; the photograph shows the meteor, afterglow, and wake as distinct components

The visible light produced by a meteor may take on various hues, depending on the chemical composition of the meteoroid, and the speed of its movement through the atmosphere. As layers of the meteoroid abrade and ionize, the colour of the light emitted may change according to the layering of minerals. Colours of meteors depend on the relative influence of the metallic content of the meteoroid versus the superheated air plasma, which its passage engenders:

- Orange-yellow (sodium)
- Yellow (iron)
- Blue-green (magnesium)
- Violet (calcium)
- Red (atmospheric nitrogen and oxygen)

=== Acoustic manifestations ===
The sound generated by a meteor in the upper atmosphere, such as a sonic boom, typically arrives many seconds after the meteor event itself. Occasionally, as with the Leonid meteor shower of 2001, "crackling", "swishing", or "hissing" sounds have been reported, occurring at the same instant as a meteor flare. These are sometimes called electrophonic sounds. Similar sounds have also been reported during intense displays of Earth's auroras.

Theories on the generation of these sounds may partially explain them. For example, scientists at NASA suggested that the turbulent ionized wake of a meteor interacts with Earth's magnetic field, generating pulses of radio waves. As the trail dissipates, megawatts of electromagnetic power could be released, with a peak in the power spectrum at audio frequencies. Physical vibrations induced by the electromagnetic impulses would then be heard if they are powerful enough to make grasses, plants, eyeglass frames, the hearer's own body (see microwave auditory effect), and other conductive materials vibrate. This proposed mechanism, although proven plausible by laboratory work, remains unsupported by corresponding measurements in the field. Sound recordings made under controlled conditions in Mongolia in 1998 support the contention that the sounds are real. (Also see Bolide.)

== Meteor shower ==
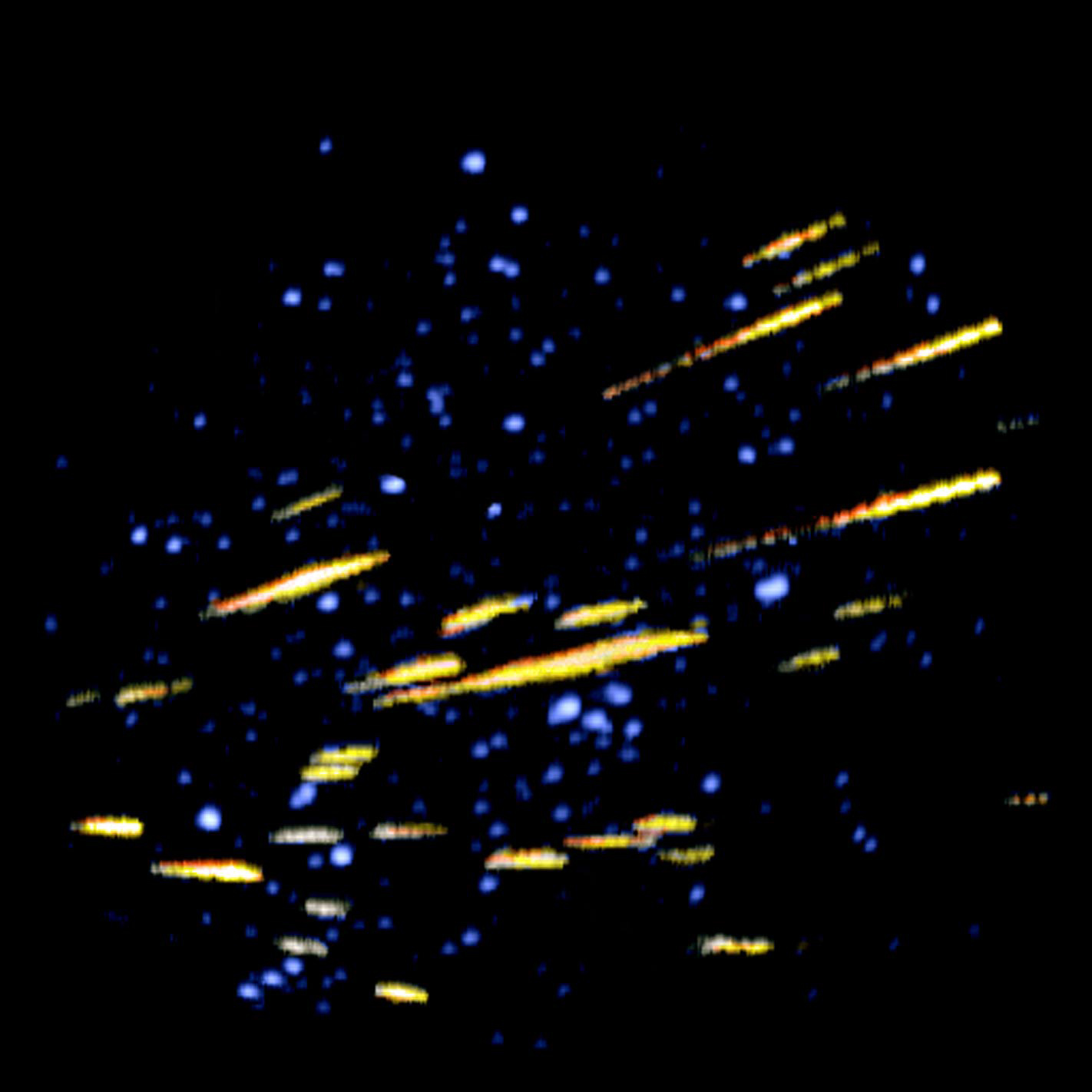
Multiple meteors photographed over an extended exposure time during a meteor shower

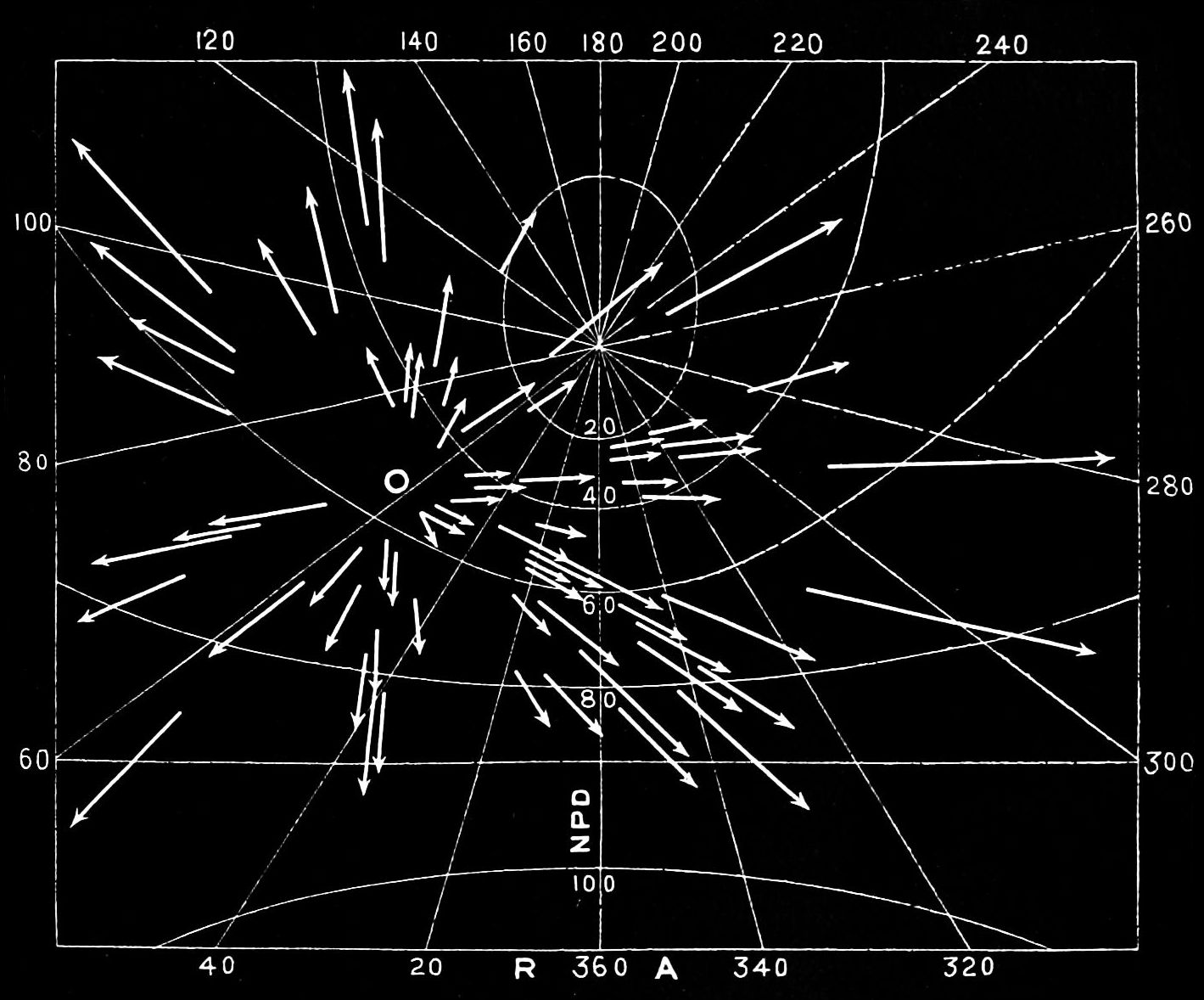
Meteor shower on chart

A meteor shower is the result of an interaction between a planet, such as Earth, and streams of debris from a comet or other source. The passage of Earth through cosmic debris from comets and other sources is a recurring event in many cases. Comets can produce debris by water vapor drag, as demonstrated by Fred Whipple in 1951, and by breakup. Each time a comet swings by the Sun in its orbit, some of its ice vaporizes and a certain amount of meteoroids are shed. The meteoroids spread out along the entire orbit of the comet to form a meteoroid stream, also known as a "dust trail" (as opposed to a comet's "dust tail" caused by the very small particles that are quickly blown away by solar radiation pressure).

The frequency of fireball sightings increases by about 10–30% during the weeks of vernal equinox. Even meteorite falls are more common during the northern hemisphere's spring season. Although this phenomenon has been known for quite some time, the reason behind the anomaly is not fully understood by scientists. Some researchers attribute this to an intrinsic variation in the meteoroid population along Earth's orbit, with a peak in big fireball-producing debris around spring and early summer. Others have pointed out that during this period the ecliptic is (in the northern hemisphere) high in the sky in the late afternoon and early evening. This means that fireball radiants with an asteroidal source are high in the sky (facilitating relatively high rates) at the moment the meteoroids "catch up" with Earth, coming from behind going in the same direction as Earth. This causes relatively low relative speeds and from this low entry speeds, which facilitates survival of meteorites. It also generates high fireball rates in the early evening, increasing chances of eyewitness reports. This explains a part, but perhaps not all of the seasonal variation. Research is in progress for mapping the orbits of the meteors to gain a better understanding of the phenomenon.

== Notable meteors ==
Comparison of approximate sizes of notable impactors with the Hoba meteorite, a Boeing 747 and a New Routemaster bus

1992 – Peekskill, New York
The Peekskill Meteorite was recorded on October 9, 1992 by at least 16 independent videographers. Eyewitness accounts indicate the fireball entry of the Peekskill meteorite started over West Virginia at 23:48 UT (±1 min). The fireball, which traveled in a northeasterly direction, had a pronounced greenish colour, and attained an estimated peak visual magnitude of −13. During a luminous flight time that exceeded 40 seconds the fireball covered a ground path of some 430 to 500 mi (700 to 800 km). One meteorite recovered at Peekskill, New York, for which the event and object gained their name, had a mass of 27 lb (12.4 kg) and was subsequently identified as an H6 monomict breccia meteorite. The video record suggests that the Peekskill meteorite had several companions over a wide area. The companions are unlikely to be recovered in the hilly, wooded terrain in the vicinity of Peekskill.
2009 – Bone, Indonesia
A large fireball was observed in the skies near Bone, Sulawesi, Indonesia on October 8, 2009. This was thought to be caused by an asteroid approximately 10 meters (33 feet) in diameter. The fireball contained an estimated energy of 50 kilotons of TNT, or about twice the Nagasaki atomic bomb. No injuries were reported.
2009 – Southwestern US
A large bolide was reported on 18 November 2009, over southeastern California, northern Arizona, Utah, Wyoming, Idaho and Colorado. At 00:07 local time a security camera at the high altitude W. L. Eccles Observatory located 2,930 m (9,610 ft) above sea level recorded a movie of the passage of the object to the north. It had a spherical "ghost" image slightly trailing the main object (likely a lens reflection of the intense fireball), and a bright fireball explosion associated with the breakup of a substantial fraction of the object. An object trail continued northward after the fireball. The shock from the final breakup triggered seven seismological stations in northern Utah. The seismic data yielded a terminal location of the object at 40.286 N, −113.191 W, altitude 27 kilometers (17 miles; 89,000 feet). This is above the Dugway Proving Grounds, a closed Army testing base.
2013 – Chelyabinsk Oblast, Russia
The Chelyabinsk meteor was an extremely bright, exploding fireball, or superbolide, measuring about 17 to 20 metres (56 to 66 feet) across, with an estimated mass of 11,000 tonnes (12,125 short tons) as the relatively small asteroid entered Earth's atmosphere. It was the largest natural object known to have entered Earth's atmosphere since the Tunguska event in 1908. Over 1,500 people were injured, mostly by glass from shattered windows caused by the air burst approximately 25 to 30 km (15.5 to 18.6 mi) above the environs of Chelyabinsk, Russia on 15 February 2013. An increasingly bright streak was observed during morning daylight with a large contrail lingering behind. At no less than one minute and up to at least three minutes after the object peaked in intensity (depending on distance from trail), a large concussive blast was heard that shattered windows and set-off car alarms, which was followed by a number of smaller explosions.
2019 – Midwestern United States
On November 11, 2019, a meteor was spotted streaking across the skies of the Midwestern United States. In the St. Louis Area, security cameras, dashcams, webcams, and video doorbells captured the object as it burned up in the earth's atmosphere. The superbolide meteor was part of the South Taurids meteor shower. It traveled east to west ending its flight somewhere near Wellsville, Missouri.

== Monitoring ==
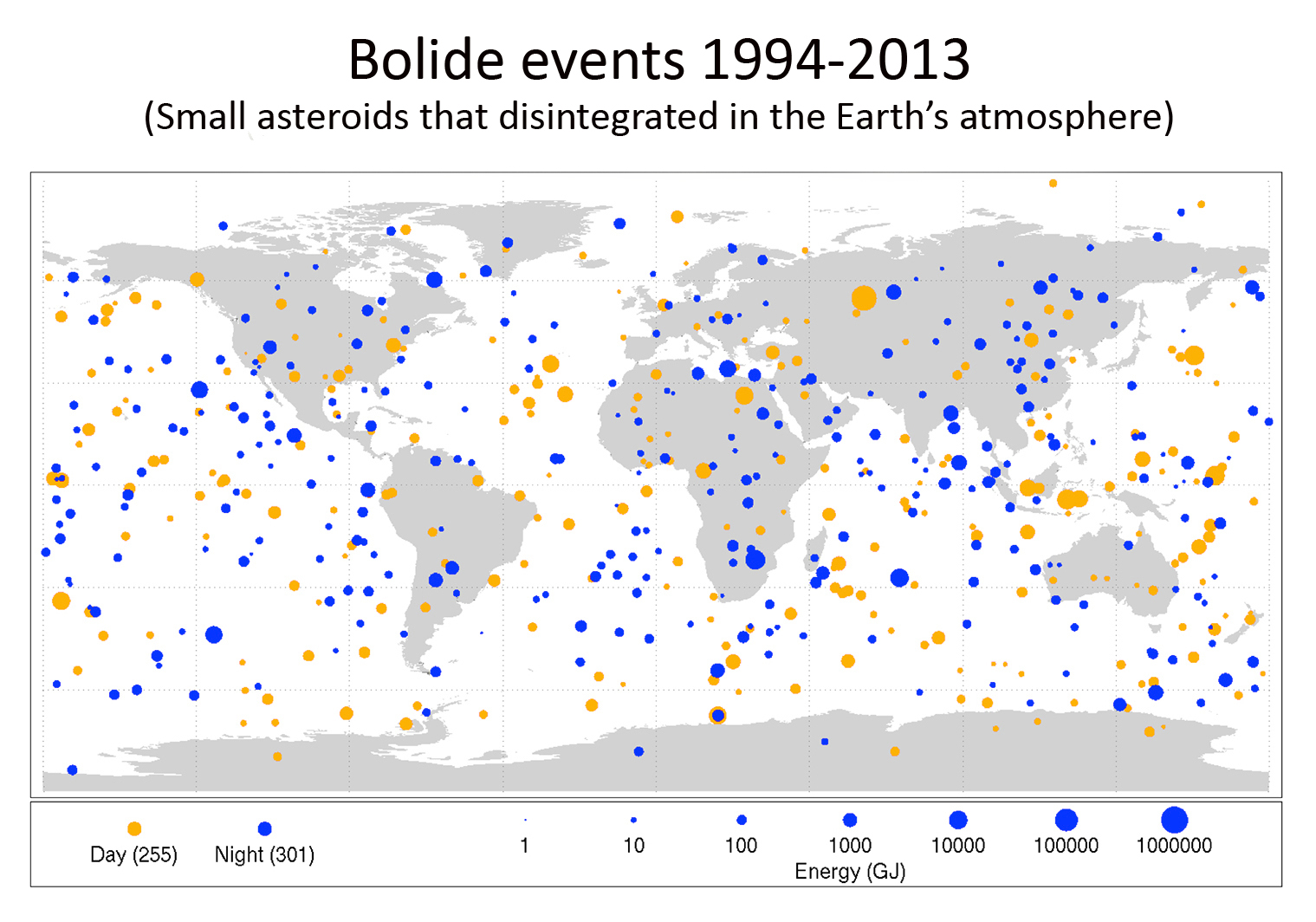
World map of large meteoric events (also see Fireball below)

In a range of countries networks of sky observing installations have been set up to monitor meteors.

- FRIPON
- North American Meteor Network
- Desert Fireball Network
- European Fireball Network

== Gallery ==
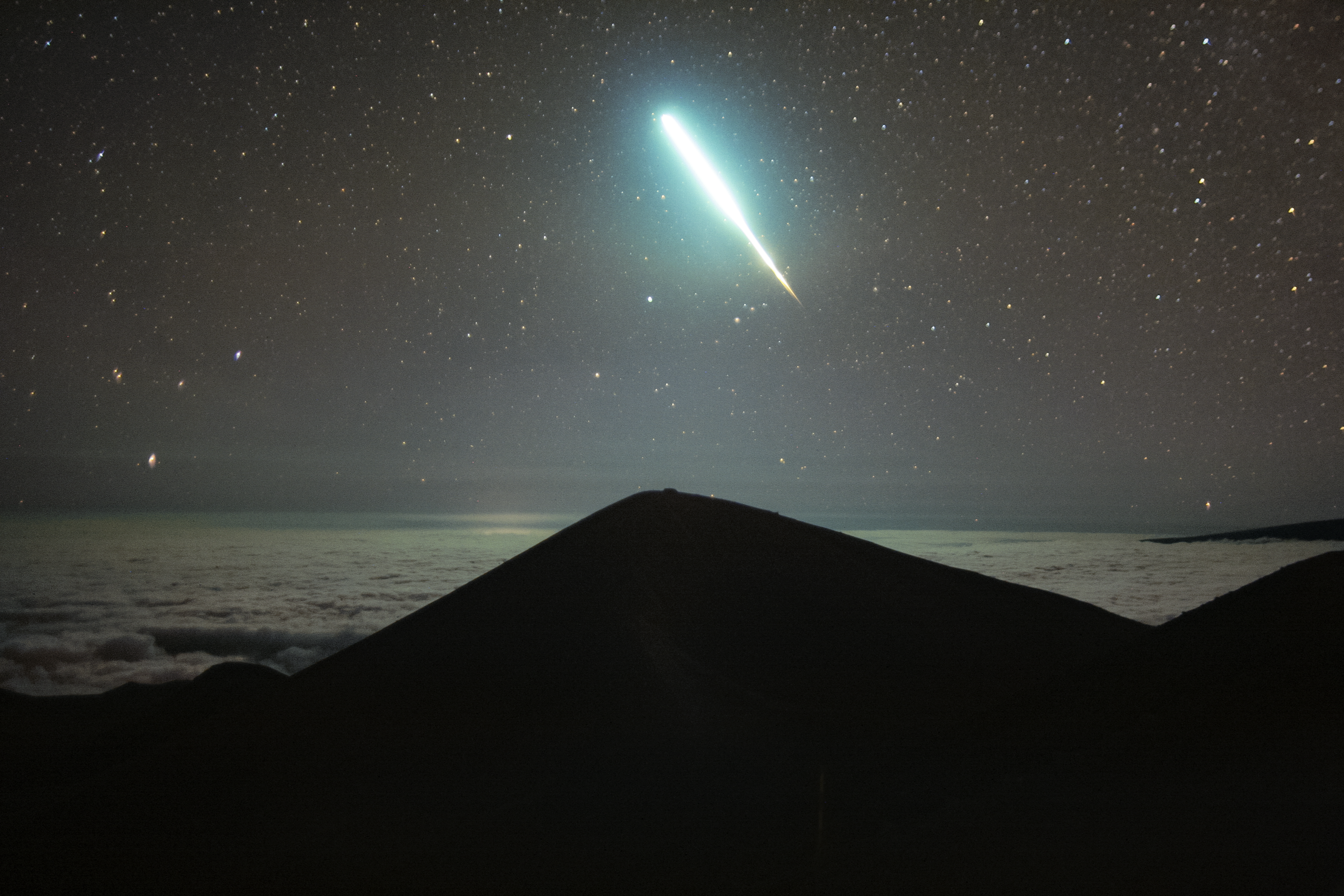
Fireball over Maunakea, Hawaiʻi, near Gemini North

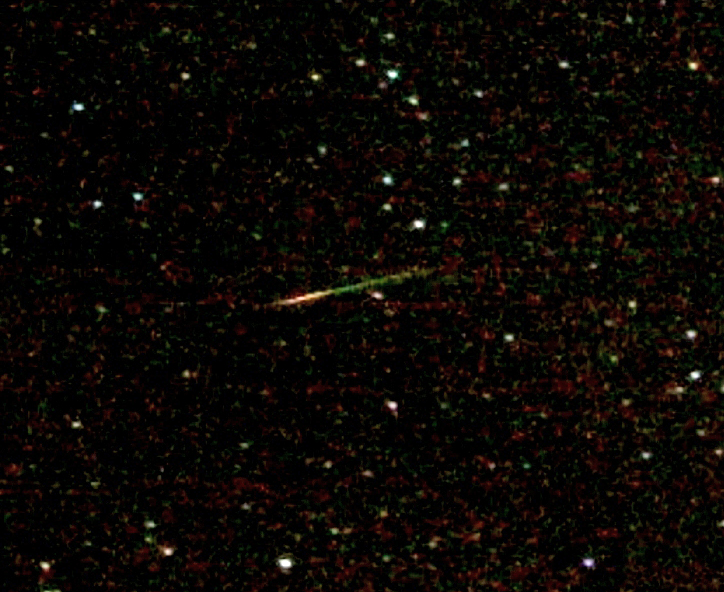
Orionid meteor

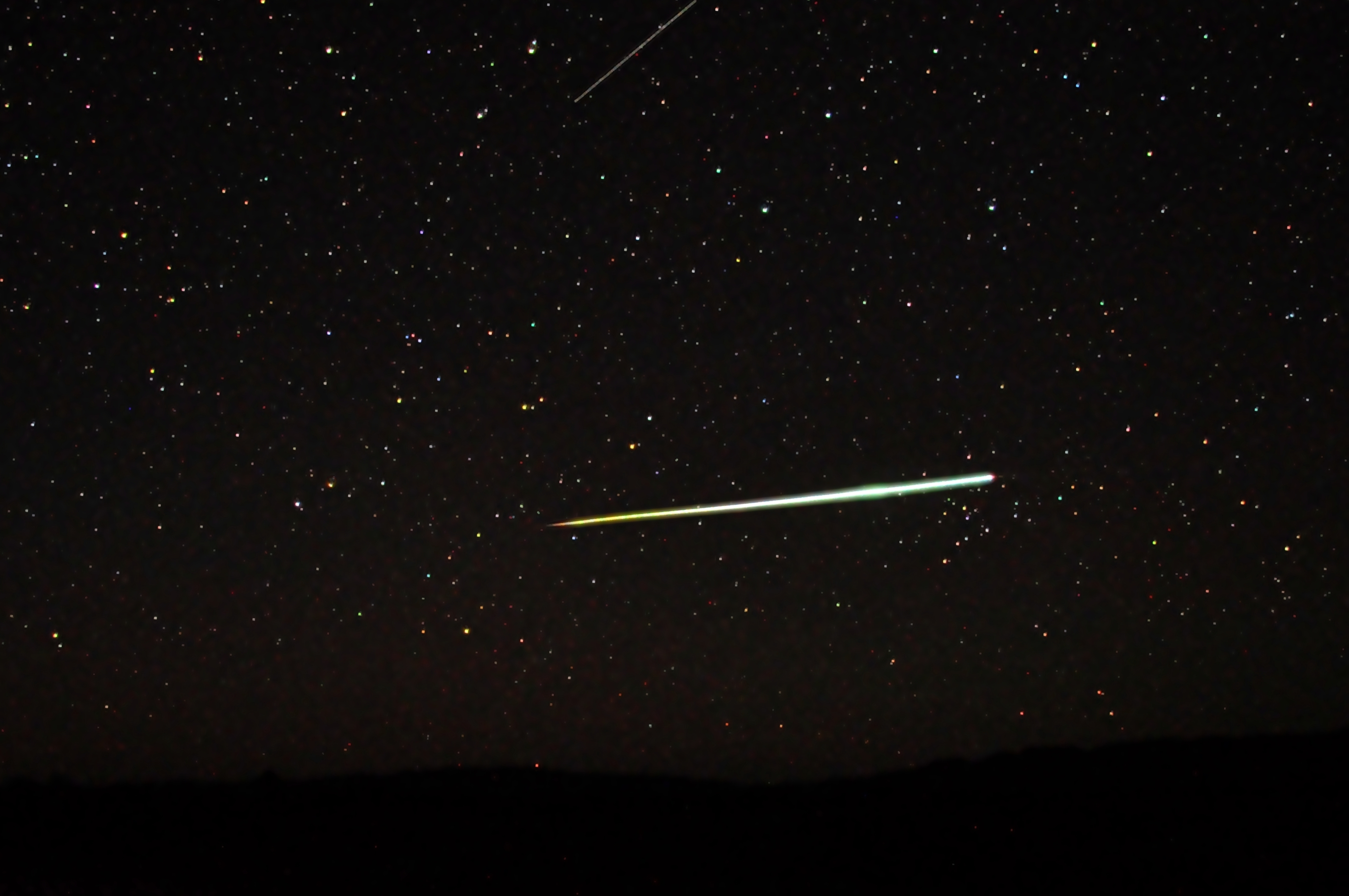
Sporadic bolide over the desert of Central Australia and a Lyrid (top edge)

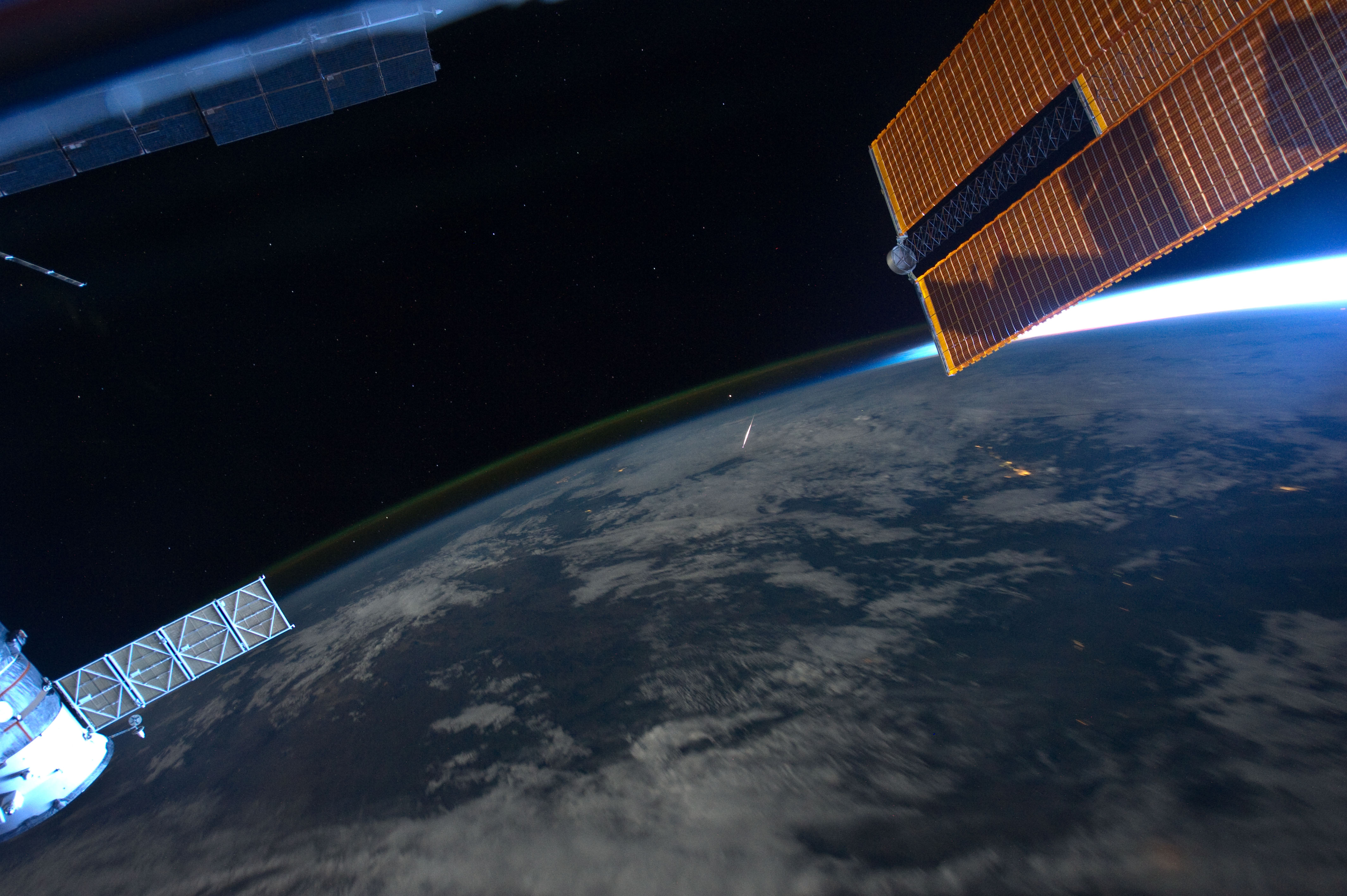
Meteor (center) seen from the International Space Station

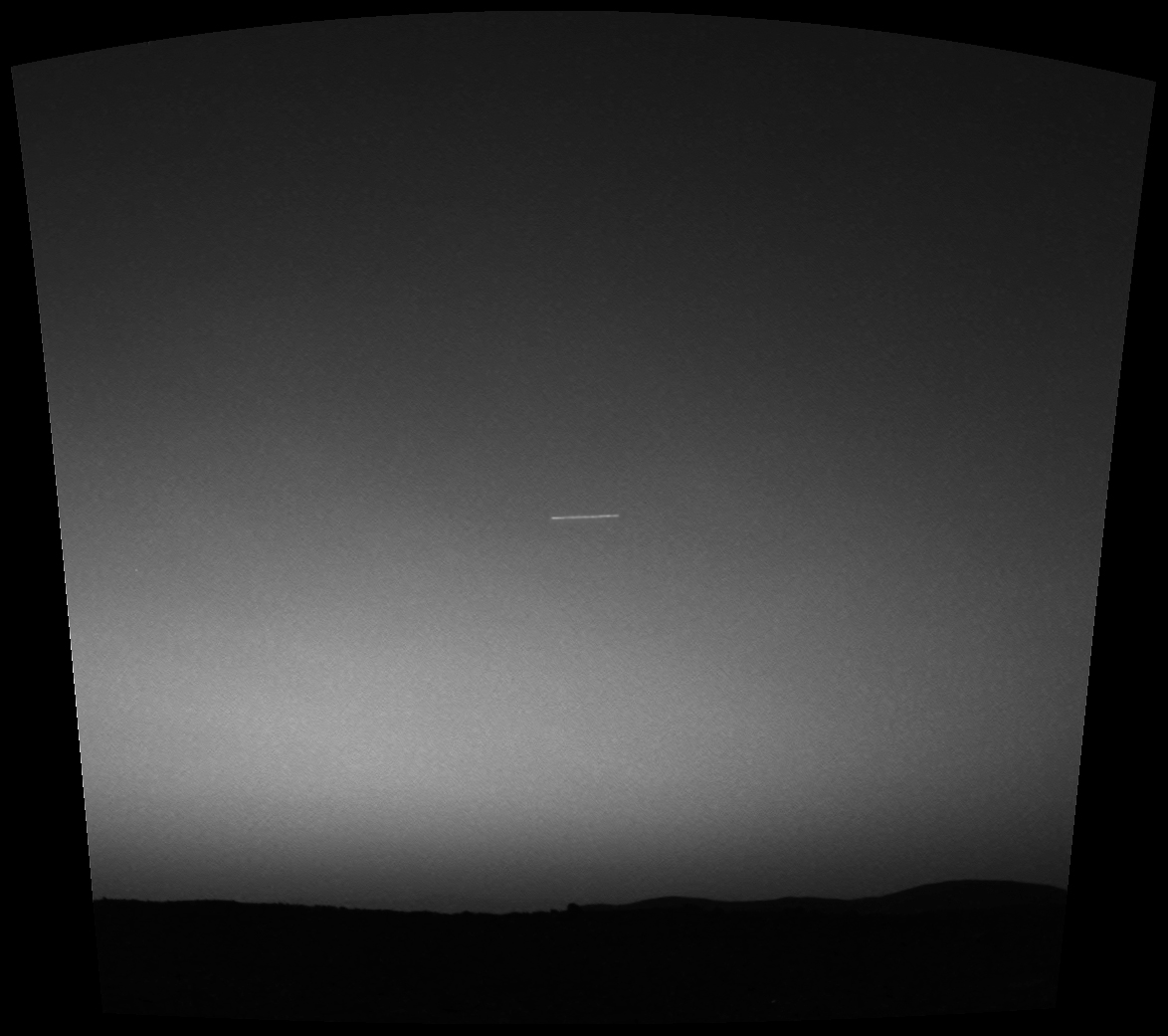
Possible meteor (center) photographed from Mars, March 7, 2004, by MER Spirit

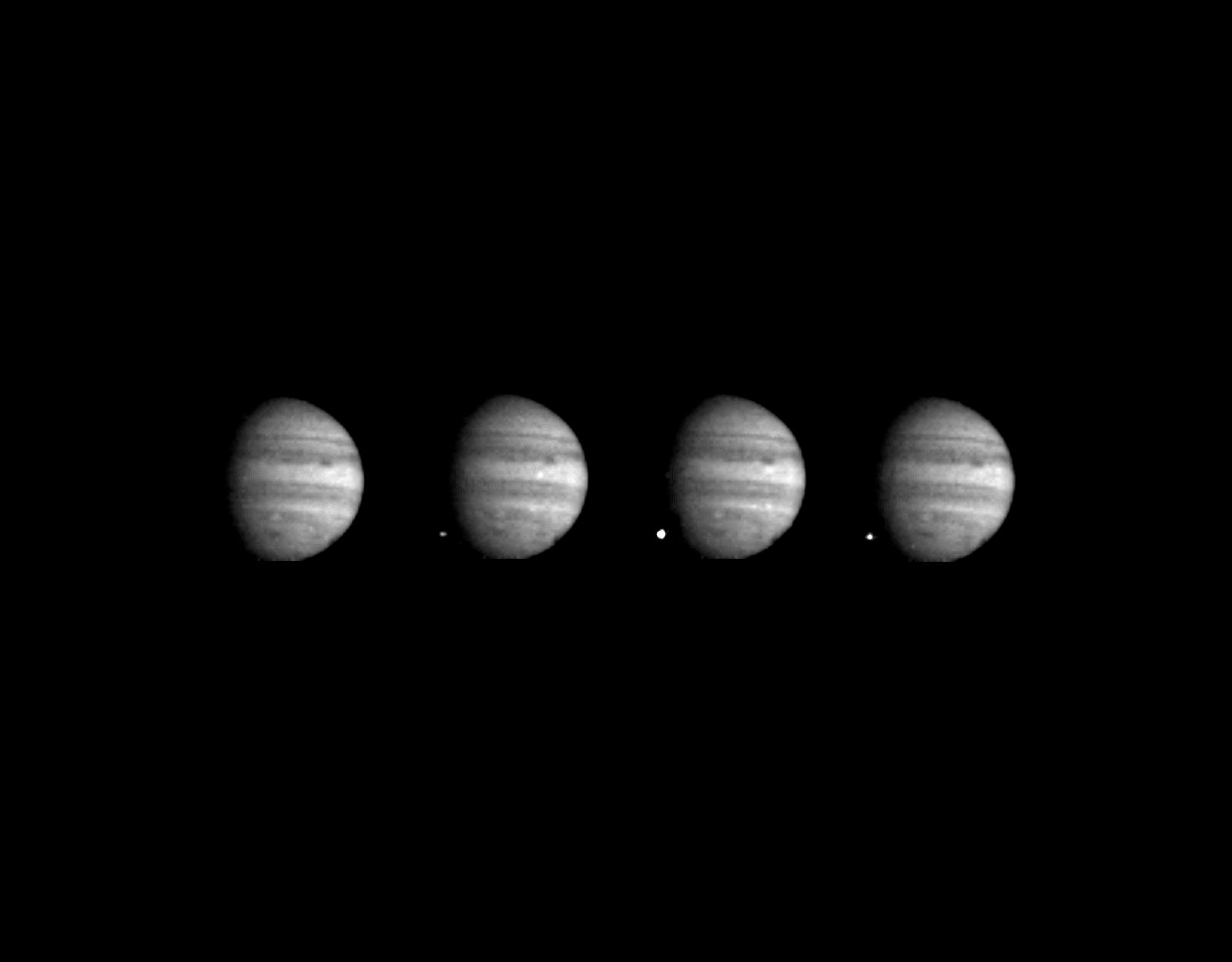
Comet Shoemaker–Levy 9 colliding with Jupiter: The sequence shows fragment W turning into a fireball on the planet's dark side

== See also ==
- American Meteor Society
- Bolide
- Desert Fireball Network
- Green fireballs
- Hydrometeor
- International Meteor Organization
- Leonids
- List of meteor showers
- Lyrids
- Meteor air burst
- North American Meteor Network
- Orionids
- Perseids
- Tollmann's hypothetical bolide
