= Bolide =

Extremely bright meteor

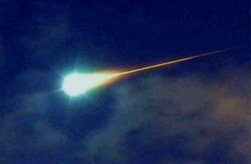
A bolide – a very bright meteor of an apparent magnitude of −4 or brighter

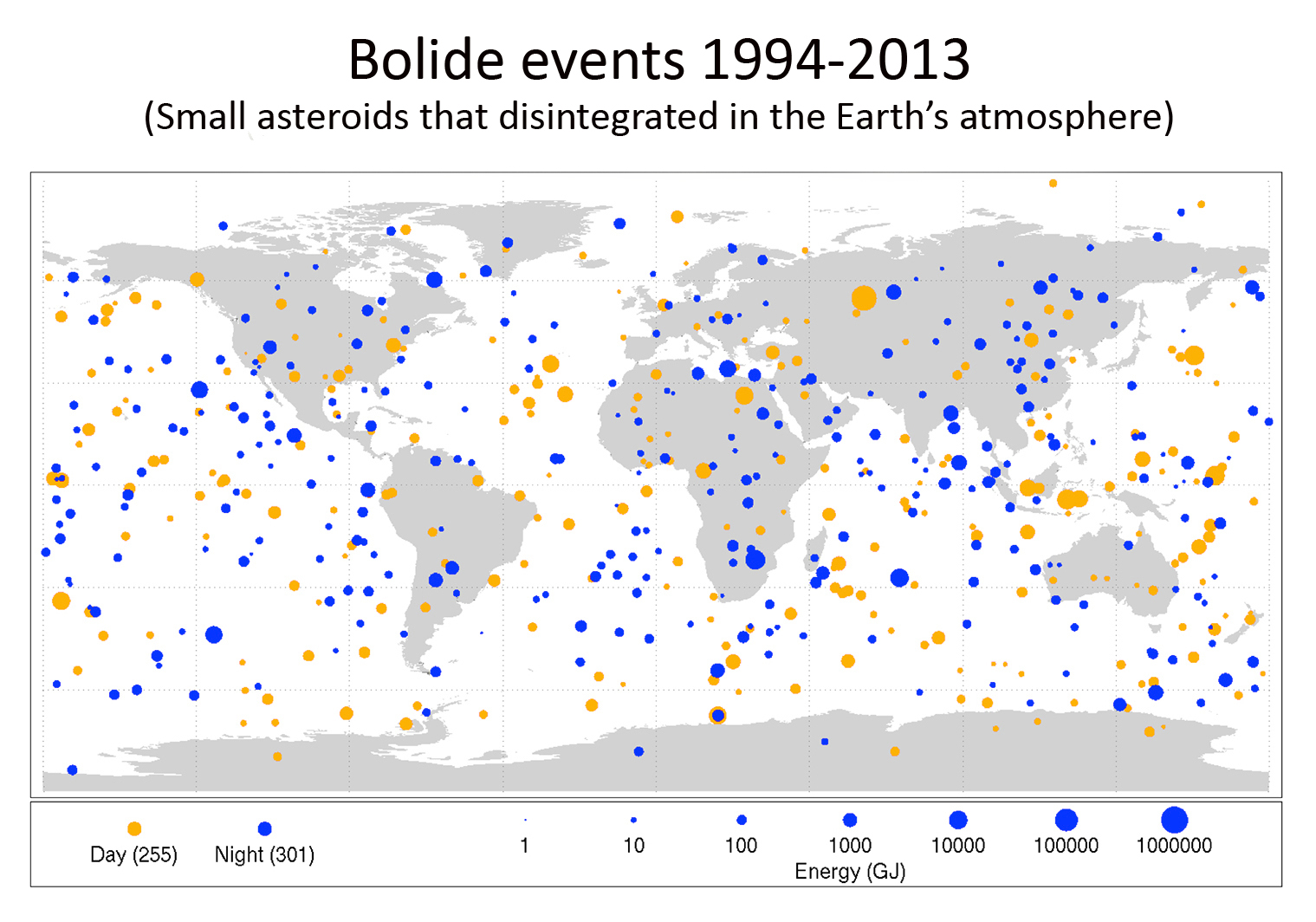
World map of bolide events (1994–2013)

A bolide is normally taken to mean an exceptionally bright meteor, but the term is subject to more than one definition, according to context. It may refer to any large crater-forming body, or to one that explodes in the atmosphere. It can be a synonym for a fireball, sometimes specific to those with an apparent magnitude of −4 or brighter.

== Definitions ==
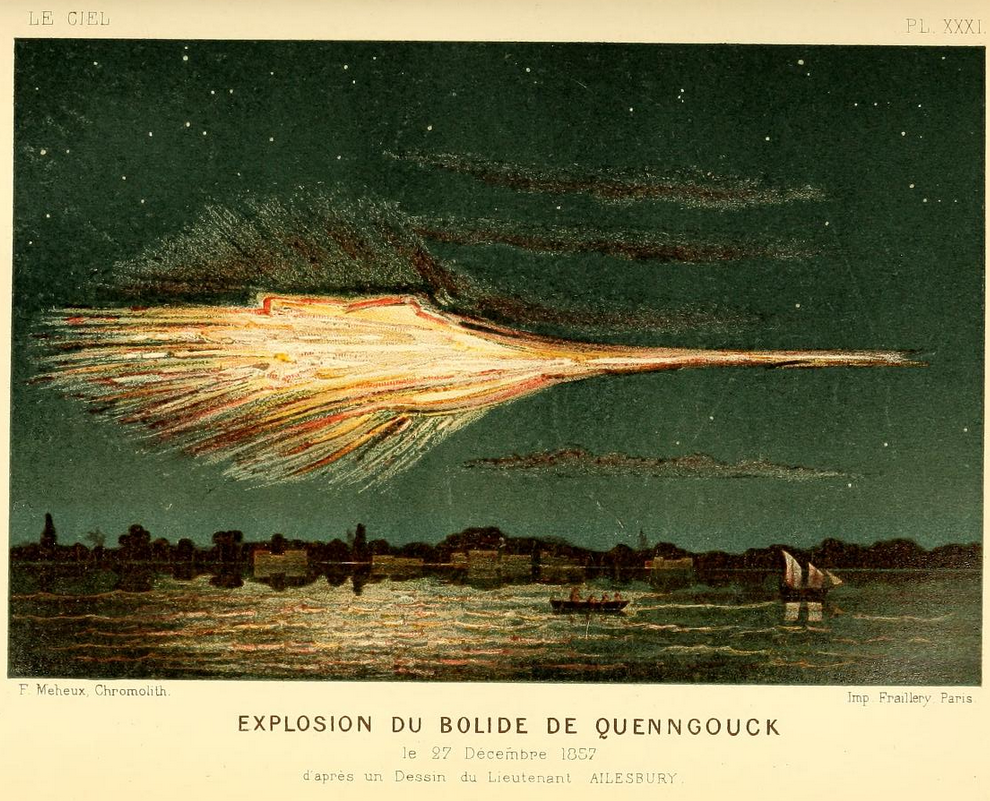
Bolide from the French astronomy book Le Ciel; Notions 'Elémentaires d'Astronomie Physique (1877)

The word bolide (/ˈboʊlaɪd/; from Italian via Latin, from Ancient Greek βολίς (bolís) 'missile') may refer to somewhat different phenomena depending on the context in which the word appears, and readers may need to make inferences to determine which meaning is intended in a particular publication. An early usage occurs in Natural History, where Pliny the Elder describes two types of prodigies, "those which are called lampades and those which are called bolides". At least one of the prodigies described by Pliny (a "spark" that fell, grew to the "size of the moon", and "returned into the heavens") has been interpreted by astronomers as a bolide in the modern sense. His description of an object coming near the earth and continuing back into the sky matches the expected trajectory of a fireball crossing above an observer. A 1771 fireball that burst above Melun, France, was widely discussed by contemporary astronomers as a "bolide" and was the subject of an official French Academy of Sciences investigation led by Jean-Baptiste Le Roy. In 1794, Ernst Chladni published a book proposing that meteors were small objects that fell to Earth from space and that small bodies existed in space beyond the moon. Though initially ridiculed, Chladni's book became the starting point for the modern field of meteoritics.

Astronomers use the word to describe any extremely bright meteor (or fireball), especially one that explodes in the atmosphere. Some astronomical definitions specify an apparent magnitude of −4 or brighter. A superbolide reaches an apparent magnitude of −17 or brighter, which is about 51 times brighter than the full moon. Recent examples of superbolides include the Sutter's Mill meteorite in California and the Chelyabinsk meteor in Russia.

Geologists use the word to describe a very large impact event. The geological definition covers any generic large crater-forming impacting body whose composition (for example, whether it is a rocky or metallic asteroid, or an icy comet) is unknown.

== Astronomy ==
Animation of a bolide's atmospheric entry and air burst

The IAU has no official definition of "bolide", and generally considers the term synonymous with fireball, a brighter-than-usual meteor; however, the term generally applies to fireballs reaching an apparent magnitude −4 or brighter. Astronomers tend to use bolide to identify an exceptionally bright fireball, particularly one that explodes (sometimes called a detonating fireball). It may also be used to mean a fireball that is audible.

=== Superbolide ===
Selected superbolide air bursts:

- Tunguska event (Russia, 1908)
- 2009 Sulawesi superbolide (Indonesia, 2009)
- Chelyabinsk meteor (Russia, 2013)

== Geology ==
Geologists use the term bolide differently from astronomers. In geology, it indicates a very large impactor. For example, the Woods Hole Coastal and Marine Science Center of the USGS uses bolide for any large crater-forming impacting body whose origin and composition is unknown, as, for example, whether it was a stony or metallic asteroid, or a less dense, icy comet made of volatiles, such as water, ammonia, and methane.

The most notable example is the bolide that caused the Chicxulub crater in Mexico, 66 million years ago. Scientific consensus agrees that this event directly led to the extinction of all non-avian dinosaurs, and it is evidenced by a thin layer of iridium found at that geological layer marking the K–Pg boundary.

== Gallery ==
Footage of a superbolide exploding over Chelyabinsk Oblast, Russia in 2013.

A bolide from the Geminids meteor shower (SAO RAS, vmag −3) in December 2010.

Dashcam footage of a bolide over Vermont, USA in September 2024.

== See also ==
- Comet Shoemaker–Levy 9 § Impacts – Comet that collided with Jupiter
- Earth-grazing fireball – Meteoroid that enters Earth's atmosphere and leaves again
- Meteor procession – Meteor that breaks apart into fragments travelling in the same direction
- Tollmann's hypothetical bolide – Hypothetical impact event
- Impact event#Airbursts – Collision of two astronomical objects
- Bugatti Bolide
- RBS 70 – Swedish man-portable air-defense system
