= David Rankin (astronomer) =

American astronomer (born 1984)

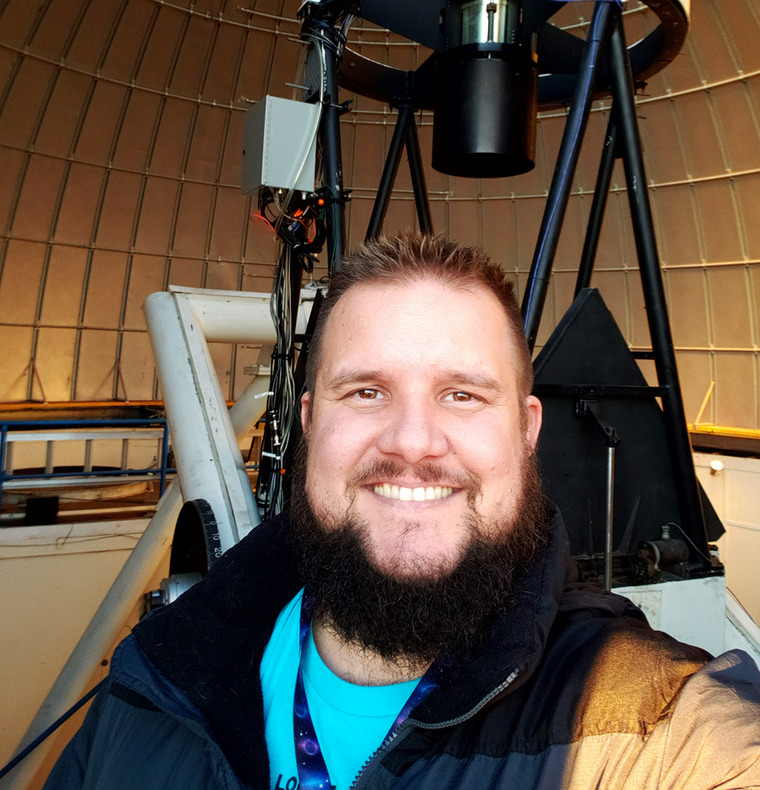
- Rankin at Mt. Lemmon Survey in 2023
- Born: 1984 (age 41–42)
- Education: University of Utah (BS)
- Children: 2
- Scientific career
- Fields: Astronomy; Planetary defense
- Workplaces: Catalina Sky Survey
- Website: rankinstudio.com

Signature
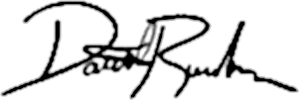

Minor planets discovered: 4
see § List of discovered minor planets

David O. Rankin (born 1984) is an American astronomer, fossil hunter, and discoverer of asteroids. He works as an R&D Operations Engineer at the Catalina Sky Survey. Among the minor planets he has discovered is 2022 WJ1, a small meteoroid that impacted the Earth on November 19, 2022, near Toronto, Ontario.

== Early life and education ==
Rankin was born in 1984. He grew up in Big Water, Utah, United States.

He holds a B.S. in Natural resource management from the University of Utah with minors in Earth science and Middle Eastern studies.

== Career ==
From a young age, he has been interested in fossil hunting. Rankin has discovered several important specimens from the Tropic Shale: In 1998, at the age of 14, he found a well preserved specimen of Brachauchenius lucasi. In 2001, he discovered the fossil of a new species of plesiosaur, which was named Eopolycotylus rankini after him. Two years later, he co-discovered Nothronychus graffami, a new species of therizinosaur. In 2017, he found a new site of 220,000-year-old pleistocene deposits at lower Wahweap Creek, which bears some of the oldest mammoth fossils in the Colorado Plateau.

Rankin has been a park ranger and a videography intern at Glen Canyon National Recreation Area. He is a self-described "flash flood chaser" and has worked on improving forecasting for flash floods in southern Utah. Rankin is an ambassador for the telescope manufacturer Explore Scientific.

=== Astronomy ===
Rankin began to observe asteroids as an amateur astronomer in 2015. Since February 2016, he reported observations to the Minor Planet Center from his home observatory in Big Water (observatory code V03). Later that year, he discovered his first Near Earth asteroid, provisionally designated 2016 XD_{1}, which he named Cecily after his wife. In 2019, he moved to Tucson where he was hired by the Catalina Sky Survey, becoming a professional astronomer.

In 2025, Rankin became one of the initial members of the Minor Planet Center's (MPC's) newly formed Singleton and archival observations committee, to help the MPC develop policy recommendations for the evaluation and publication of archival data.

== Personal life ==
Rankin was raised a Mormon, but he is no longer associated with the church. He is married and has two sons.

== List of discovered minor planets and comets ==
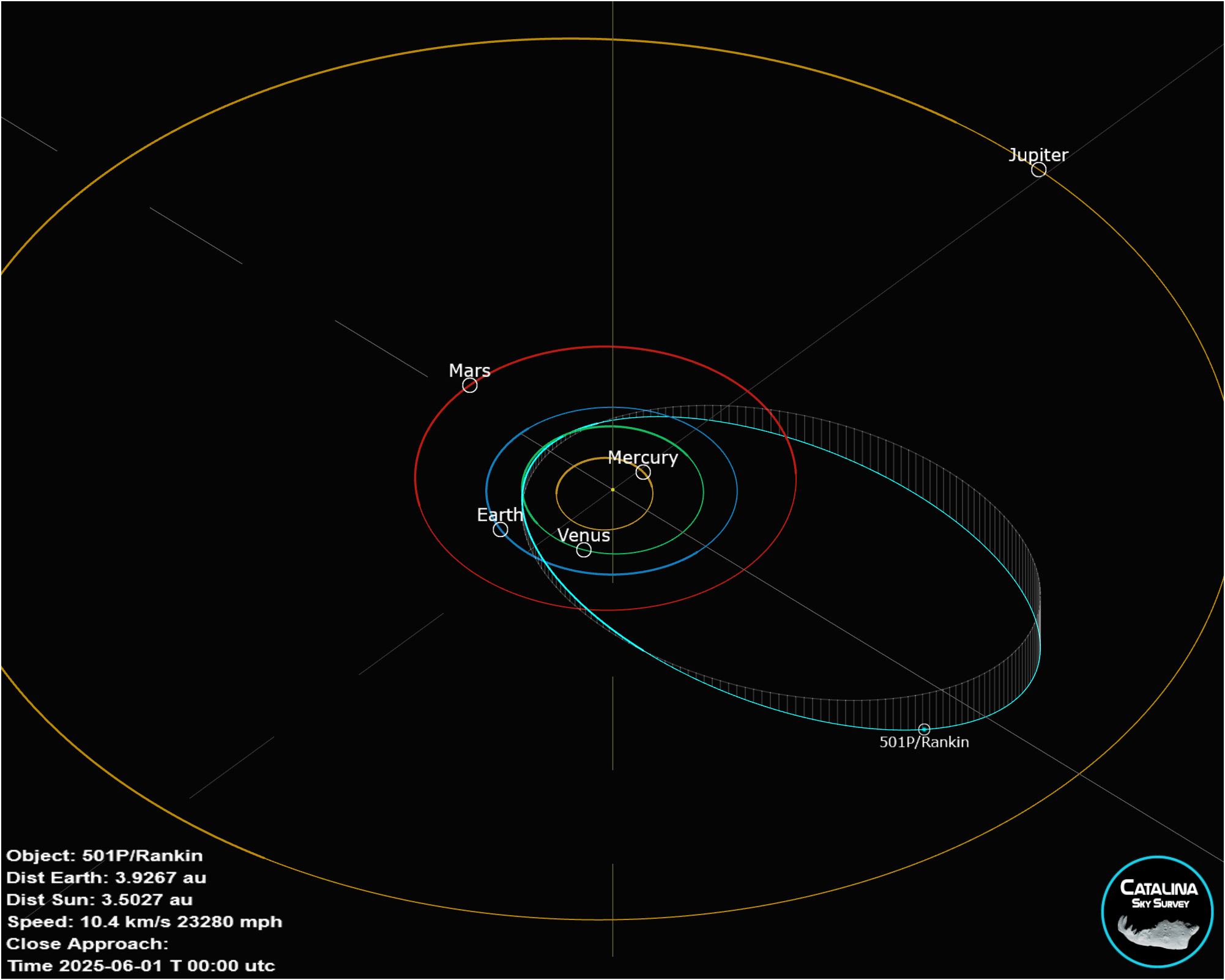
Orbit of comet 501P/Rankin

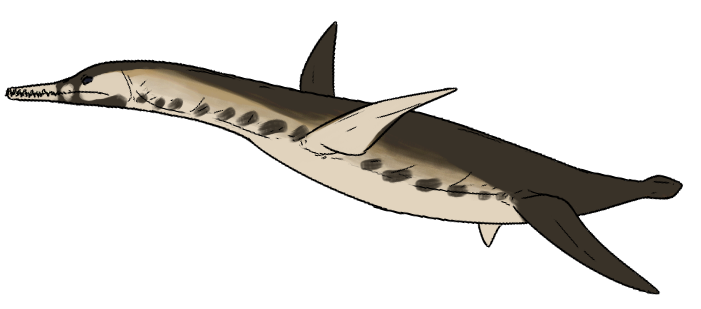
Life reconstruction of Eopolycotylus rankini

As of May 2026, Rankin is personally credited with discovering four minor planets (all from Big Water) and 15 comets (including one from Saguaro Observatory at his home in Tucson):

605911 Cecily	December 3, 2016	list
771739 Joseph	August 31, 2016	list
771914 Dawsoncharles	December 29, 2016	list
788573 Isaiah	December 30, 2016	list
501P/Rankin	June 15, 2024	list
C/2020 B3 (Rankin)	January 29, 2020	list
C/2020 K6 (Rankin)	May 26, 2020	list
C/2020 R6 (Rankin)	September 15, 2020	list
C/2020 U3 (Rankin)	October 22, 2020	list
P/2020 V4 (Rankin)	November 15, 2020	list

P/2020 W1 (Rankin)	November 16, 2020	list
C/2021 C1 (Rankin)	February 11, 2021	list
P/2021 R5 (Rankin)	September 9, 2021	list
C/2021 V1 (Rankin)	November 5, 2021	list
P/2022 W1 (Rankin)	November 18, 2022	list
P/2024 S2 (Rankin)	September 30, 2024	list
P/2024 T1 (Rankin)	October 2, 2024	list
P/2024 T2 (Rankin)	October 4, 2024	list
C/2025 V2 (Rankin)	November 2, 2025	list

In addition, he has discovered numerous Near Earth objects at Catalina, including the small impactor 2022 WJ_{1}, the 6th asteroid in history to be discovered before it collided with the Earth. (Note: The five previously predicted impactors are: 2008 TC3, 2014 AA, 2018 LA, 2019 MO, and 2022 EB5.)

== Awards and honors ==
Eopolycotylus rankini, a species of plesiosaur, is named after him. In 2019, the main belt asteroid 62701 Davidrankin was named in his honor.
