= List of predicted asteroid impacts on Earth =

This is a list of asteroids that have impacted Earth after discovery and orbit calculation that predicted the impact in advance, which are cataloged by the Center for Near-Earth Object Studies (CNEOS).

== List ==
As of September 2026, all of the asteroids with predicted impacts were under 10 m (33 ft) in size that were discovered just hours before impact, and burned up in the atmosphere as meteors.

Asteroid designation	Date & time (UTC) of discovery	Warning time	Estimated size	Abs. mag.	Date & time (UTC) of impact	Location of impact	Airburst altitude Energy	Method of impact detection	Reference
2008 TC3	2008-10-06 06:39; Mt. Lemmon Survey	20 h 06 min	3.8–4.4 m (12–14 ft)	30.72	2008-10-07 02:45	20.9°N 31.8°E; Nubian Desert in Sudan	50.0 km (31.1 mi); 1 kt	Visual, weather satellite, meteorite recovery	MPC · JPL ·
2014 AA	2014-01-01 06:18; Mt. Lemmon Survey	20 h 46 min	2–4 m (6.6–13.1 ft)	30.95	2014-01-02 03:04	13.1°N 44.2°W; Central Atlantic Ocean	40.0 km (24.9 mi) ?	Infrasound	MPC · JPL ·
2018 LA	2018-06-02 08:14; Mt. Lemmon Survey	8 h 30 min	2–5 m (6.6–16.4 ft)	30.55	2018-06-02 16:44	21.3°S 23.3°E; Botswana / South Africa border	27.8 km (17.3 mi); 0.3–0.5 kt	Visual, infrasound, meteorite recovery	MPC · JPL ·
2019 MO	2019-06-22 09:49; ATLAS-MLO	11 h 36 min	4–9 m (13–30 ft)	29.12	2019-06-22 21:25	14.9°N 66.2°W; Caribbean Sea near Puerto Rico	25.0 km (15.5 mi); 6 kt	Visual, infrasound, weather satellite & radar	MPC · JPL ·
2022 EB5	2022-03-11 19:24; GINOP-KHK	1 h 58 min	1.4–3.2 m (4.6–10.5 ft)	31.33	2022-03-11 21:22	70.0°N 9.1°W; Jan Mayen, northern Atlantic Ocean	33.3 km (20.7 mi); 4 kt	Visual, infrasound	MPC · JPL ·
2022 WJ1	2022-11-19 04:53; Mt. Lemmon Survey	3 h 33 min	0.4–0.6 m (1.3–2.0 ft)	33.58	2022-11-19 08:26	43.0°N 81.7°W; Ontario, Canada	95.5 km (59.3 mi) ?	Visual, radar	MPC · JPL ·
2023 CX1	2023-02-12 20:18; GINOP-KHK	6 h 41 min	0.8–1.7 m (2.6–5.6 ft)	32.72	2023-02-13 02:59	49.8°N 0.4°E; Northwestern France	50.0 km (31.1 mi) ?	Visual, meteorite recovery	MPC · JPL ·
2024 BX1	2024-01-20 21:48; GINOP-KHK	2 h 44 min	<0.5 m (1.6 ft)	32.71	2024-01-21 00:32	52.6°N 12.6°E; Berlin, Germany	21.3 km (13.2 mi) ?	Visual, meteorite recovery	MPC · JPL ·
2024 RW1	2024-09-04 05:43; Mt. Lemmon Survey	10 h 56 min	1–2.5 m (3.3–8.2 ft)	32.20	2024-09-04 16:39	18.0°N 122.9°E; Pacific Ocean near Luzon, Philippines	25.0 km (15.5 mi); 0.2 kt	Visual	MPC · JPL ·
2024 UQ	2024-10-22 09:08; ATLAS-HKO	1 h 46 min	0.8–1.6 m (2.6–5.2 ft)	32.66	2024-10-22 10:54	30.0°N 136.0°W; Eastern Pacific	38.2 km (23.7 mi); 0.15 kt	Weather satellite	MPC · JPL ·
2024 XA1	2024-12-03 05:55; Kitt Peak-Bok	10 h 19 min	0.7–1.5 m (2.3–4.9 ft)	32.95	2024-12-03 16:14	60.9°N 119.5°E; Eastern Siberia	50.0 km (31.1 mi) ?	Visual	MPC · JPL ·
2026 JN_{4}	2026-5-15 10:21; JPL SynTrack Robotic Telescope	3 h 15 min	0.6–1.4 m (2.0–4.6 ft)	32.95	2026-5-15 13:36	9.1°S 137.1°E; New Guinea	50.0 km (31.1 mi) ?	Impact unconfirmed	MPC · JPL ·
2026 RW_{1}	2026-9-6 8:45; Mt. Lemmon Survey	7 h 22 min	0.8–0.9 m (2.6–3.0 ft)	33.27	2026-9-6 16:07	13.9°S 116.1°E; Indian Ocean	TBA	Visual	MPC · JPL ·

== See also ==
- Asteroid impact prediction
