= Cameras for All-Sky Meteor Surveillance =

Meteor shower observatory

Cameras for All-Sky Meteor Surveillance (CAMS)
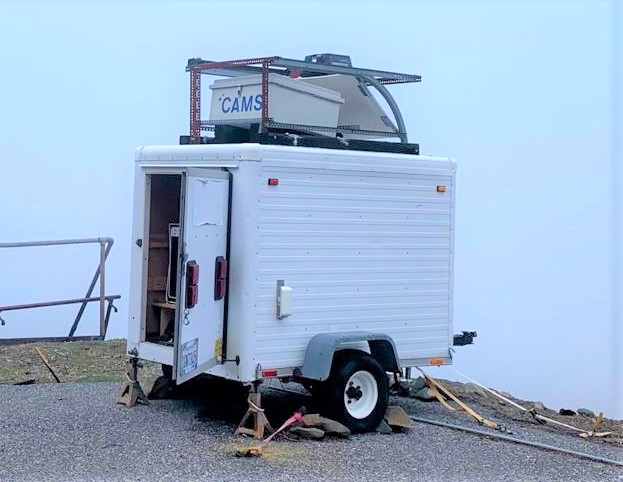
- The CAMS station at Lick Observatory, in California, set up in April 2011. The CAMS box at the top contains the cameras.
- Mission statement: CAMS is an automated video surveillance of the night sky to validate the IAU Working List of Meteor Showers.
- Commercial?: No
- Location: Global
- Founder: Peter Jenniskens
- Established: October 10, 2010
- Funding: This article incorporates public domain material from websites or documents of the National Aeronautics and Space Administration.
- Status: active
- Website: www.seti.org/cams, meteorshowers.seti.org

CAMS (the Cameras for All-Sky Meteor Surveillance project) is a NASA-sponsored international project that tracks and triangulates meteors during night-time video surveillance in order to map and monitor meteor showers. Data processing is housed at the Carl Sagan Center of the SETI Institute in California, USA. Goal of CAMS is to validate the International Astronomical Union's Working List of Meteor Showers, discover new meteor showers, and predict future meteor showers.

== CAMS Methods ==
CAMS networks around the world use an array of low-light video surveillance cameras to collect astrometric tracks and brightness profiles of meteors in the night sky. Triangulation of those tracks results in the meteor's direction and speed, from which the meteors’ orbit in space is calculated and the material's parent body can be identified.

The CAMS software modules, written by Peter S. Gural, have scaled up the video-based triangulation of meteors. The most widely used scripts to run these modules on PCs at the stations were written by Dave Samuels and Steve Rau. Through a series of computational and statistical algorithms, each streak of light in the video is identified and the track is verified as being a meteor or belonging to another light source like planes, or light reflected from moving clouds, birds, and bats.

The first CAMS camera stations were set up in October 2010 at Fremont Peak Observatory and in Mountain View, followed in April 2011 by a station at Lick Observatory, in California. A station in Foresthill was added to the CAMS California network in April 2015. CAMS has since expanded into 15 networks worldwide. Networks of cameras are located in the USA (California, Northern California, Arizona, Texas, Arkansas, Maryland, and Florida), in the BeNeLux (The Netherlands, Belgium and Luxembourg), and in the United Arab Emirates on the northern hemisphere, and in New Zealand, Australia, South Africa, Namibia, Brazil, and Chile on the southern hemisphere.

== CAMS Notable contributions ==
=== Demonstrate the presence of yet-to-be discovered long-period comets and improve their orbits ===
- In April 2021, CAMS published work that identified 14, and perhaps as many as 20, already known long-period comets as parent bodies of one of our meteor showers. Meteor showers were found for nearly all known comets approaching Earth orbit to 0.01 AU that have orbital periods in the 250 to 4,000 year range. Most long-period comet showers were found to be active for many days, showing precession of the comet orbit over time.
- In April 2019, CAMS New Zealand station detected a brief outburst of 5 meteors from comet C/1907 G1 (Grigg-Mellish). Based on the 1907 observations of the comet alone, valid orbit solutions showed a range of orbital periods but with a strong correlation between orbit node and orbital period due to an uncertain distance between comet and observer. The timing of the outburst was used to refine the node of the comet orbit, and thereby the orbital period.

=== Discovery of new meteor showers and validation of previously reported showers ===
On February 4, 2011, CAMS detected a brief meteor shower from a still undiscovered long-period comet, thereby proving the existence of that comet. The meteors radiated from the direction of the star Eta Draconis resulting in the new shower called the February Eta Draconids (FEDs) This was just the first of a long list of newly discovered meteor showers. As of Feb 17, 2021, CAMS has helped establish 92 out of 112 single showers and recognized 323 out of 700 meteor showers in the Working List.

- 2021:
  1. CAMS networks in New Zealand and Chile detected a predicted outburst of meteors from comet 15P/Finlay on September 27–30, the first time meteors were seen from this comet and the new shower is called the "Arids" (number 1130). The outburst was caused by Earth crossing the 1995 dust ejecta
  2. CAMS Texas and CAMS California detected an outburst of Perseids. Peak rates increased to ZHR = 130 per hour above normal 40 per hour Perseid rates. The peak was at 8.2 h UTC August 14. Most meteors were faint. This encounter with the dust trails or Filament of 109P/Swift-Tuttle was not anticipated
- 2020:
1. CAMS detected a new shower now called the gamma Piscis Austrinids
2. CAMS detected rho Phoenicids, a shower previously known only from radar observations.
- 2017:
1. On December 13, CAMS captured 3003 Geminids and 1154 sporadic meteors which shattered all previous records on the number of meteors detected in a single night
- 2011:
1. CAMS detected the annual eta Eridanids (ERI) from comet C/1852 K1 (Charcornac)
2. CAMS verified from video the April Rho Cygnids (ARC), originally discovered from radar by the Canadian Meteor Orbit Radar (CMOR)

=== Monitoring unusual activity of meteor showers ===
In recent years, the effort has shifted from mapping the annual meteor showers to monitoring unusual meteor shower activity.

Examples of newly detected showers with unusual meteor activity
Meteor Shower Name	IAU Code	IAU Shower number	Year	Features
Arids		1130	2021	newly detected
June theta2 Sagittariids		1129	2021	newly detected
gamma Crucids	GCR	1047	2021	either newly detected or possible return of 1980 alpha Centaurids?
29 Piscids	PIS	1046	2020	newly detected; then stream showed once in October, then again in November
September upsilon Taurids	SUT	1045	2020	newly detected shower
gamma Piscis Austrinids		1036	2020	newly detected
sigma Phoenicids	SPH	1035	2020	newly detected
chi Cygnids	CCY	757	2015	newly detected and returned in 2020
Volantids	VOL	758	2015	newly detected as the New Year's Eve shower. Returned New Year's Eve 2020.

- 2021:
1. Detected a new shower in the June Aquilid Complex, the June theta2 Saggitarriids (IAU number 1129). The shower was also strong in 2020.
2. Detected an unusual shower, the zeta Pavonids (IAU number 853). The shower activity profile had a full width at half maximum duration of only 0.46 degrees centered on 1.41 degree solar longitude.
3. Strong activity from the beta Tucanids (IAU number 108) detected, initially mistaken for the nearby delta Mensids (IAU 130), this shower was also strong in radar observations last year in 2020. A total of 29 beta Tucanids were triangulated by CAMS networks this year, compared to 5 meteors last year.
4. Detected a strong outburst of gamma Crucids (IAU number 1047) in February. This shower may have been a return of the 1980 alpha Centaurids outburst reported by visual meteor observers.
- 2020:
1. A significant meteor activity from A-Carinids, an otherwise weak annual shower that was detected by CAMS
2. CAMS discovered meteors of chi Phoenicids, a new long-period comet
3. Outburst of Ursids caused by the 1076 A.D. dust of comet 8P/Tuttle
4. CAMS recognized early sightings of chi Cygnids in late August, forecasting the return of that shower. Shower was last seen in 2015. The shower indeed returned and was observed in detail in September.
- 2019:
1. CAMS detected an outburst of 15 Bootids, whose orbital elements resemble those of bright comet C/539 W1, suggesting that this meteor shower was caused by the same bright comet as was described in Histories of the Wars, an 553 A.D. book. Expectation is that the comet is on its way back, and predictions were made on where to search in the sky based on the orbital elements of the meteoroid stream.
2. CAMS captured an outburst of June epsilon Ophiuchids. The parent body was identified as periodic Jupiter Family comet 300P/Catalina
3. CAMS detected an outburst of Phoenicids from comet Blanpain.
4. A predicted alpha Monocerotid outburst ("the unicorn shower") was observed by the CAMS Florida, but best viewing was over the Atlantic Ocean. Shower was wider and weaker than anticipated, which according to Jenniskens: "This suggests we crossed the dust trail further from the trail center than anticipated."
- 2018:
1. CAMS captured an outburst of October Draconids from 21P/Giacobini-Zinner.
2. CAMS again detected the October Camelopardalids.
- 2017:
1. Earth traveled through the 1-revolution dust trail of a long-period comet C/2015 D4 (Borisov). Jenniskens noted that "Only about once every 25 years is such an intermediate long-period comet discovered that passes close enough to Earth's orbit to have dust trail encounters. This one passed perihelion in 2014." CAMS South Africa network captured 167 meteors.
2. CAMS captured 12 meteors from an outburst of October Camelopardalids (OCT)
- 2016:
1. An outburst of gamma Draconids was detected by CAMS
2. CAMS picked up an outburst of Ursids in December.
- 2011:
1. A mobile system of CAMS was used to observed an outburst of the 2011 Draconid meteor shower in Europe. First results from 28 Draconid trajectories and orbits show that the meteors originated from the 1900 dust ejecta of comet 21P/Giacobini-Zinner

=== Guiding astronomers in locating the site of freshly fallen meteorites ===
In 2016, Lowell Observatory CAMS in Arizona captured a -20 magnitude fireball from which 15 meteorites were recovered. The results showed where LL type chondrites originate in the asteroid belt between Mars and Jupiter.

In 2012, the Novato meteorite that generated sonic booms was detected by CAMS, and retrieved by local resident Lisa Webber following publication of tracking information. The meteorite was identified as a L6 type chondrite fragmental breccia.

== Visualization and data access ==
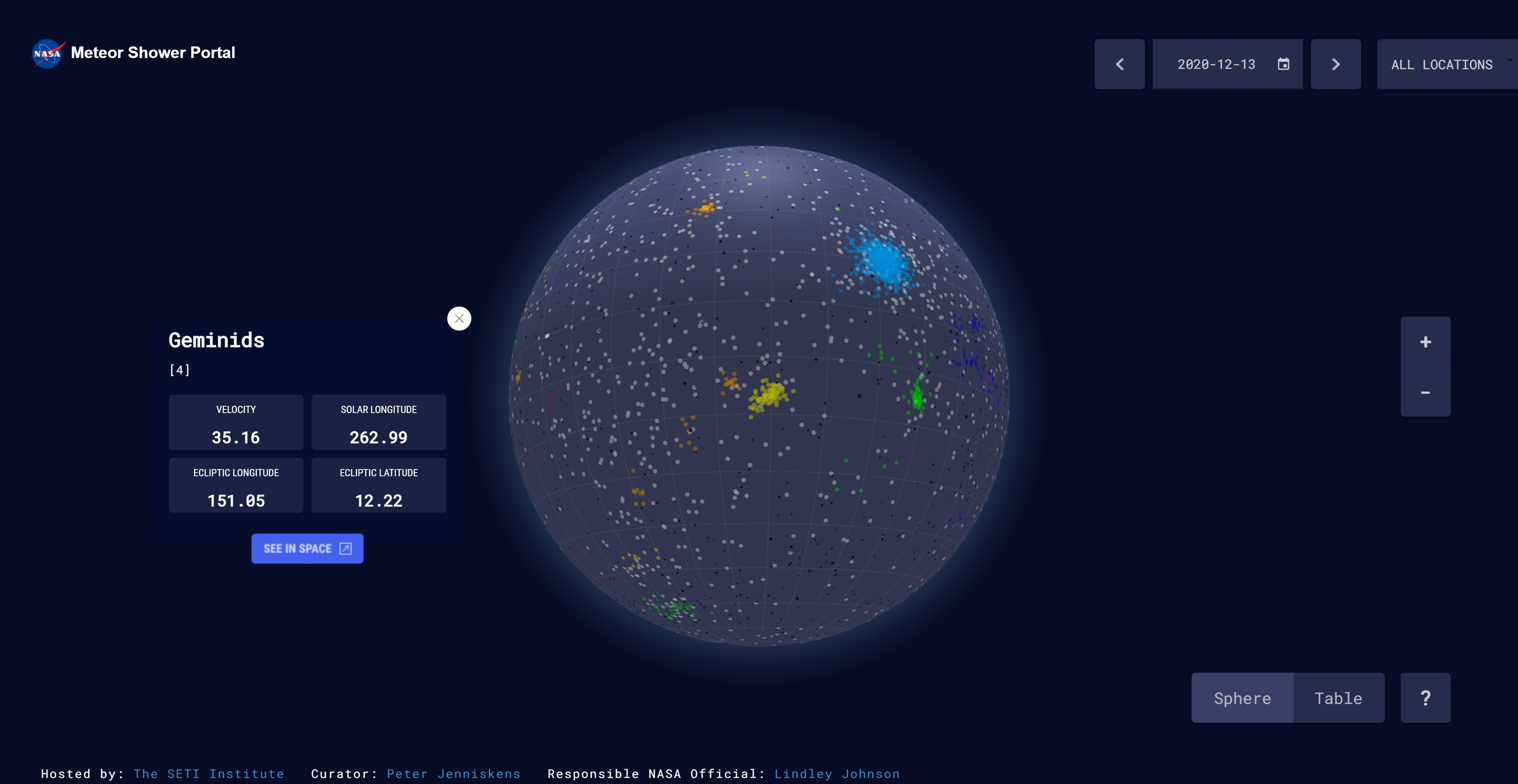
The upgraded and refined NASA CAMS Meteor Shower Portal built by SpaceML meteorshowers.seti.org

Every night, the combined CAMS networks generate a map of meteor shower activity. Those maps can be accessed the next morning at the CAMS online portal at cams.seti.org/FDL/, built by Frontier Development Lab, offering scientists the opportunity to engage with data and offering amateur astronomers guidance on what meteor showers are active.

Building on top of these features, the online portal has been refined and upgraded by SpaceML at meteorshowers.seti.org, offering additional features such as the ability to zoom into meteor showers, presence of constellations serving as a geographic reference, and a timeline view that allows viewing and exporting specific meteor shower activity for scientific communication.

When clicking on one of the points in the websites above, the user is presented with a visualization of the CAMS-detected meteoroid streams in a solar system planetarium setting developed by Ian Webster. The site can be directly accessed at www.meteorshowers.org/view/iau-4. Each point in this visualization moves in the orbit of one CAMS-triangulated meteor.

== Featured in the media ==
- Asteroid 42981 Jenniskens is named after Dr. Peter Jenniskens
- The International Astronomical Union named main belt asteroids after CAMS team members Pete Gural and Jim Albers at the 2014 Asteroids, Comets, Meteors conference.
- The New York Times published a story on CAMS's meteoroid stream visualization tool
- The Japanese broadcasting company NHK filmed the CAMS station at Lick Observatory for a documentary
- Nature News mentioned the impact of CAMS as "Eighty-six previously unknown have now joined the regular spectaculars, which include the Perseids, Leonids and Geminids."
- Frontier Development Lab built an AI pipeline and data visualization dashboard for CAMS. This pipeline has been presented in the media by Nvidia blogs and at their flagship conference, GPU Technology Conference. The FDL collaboration on CAMS project, and the AI pipeline is an outcome of NASA's Asteroid Grand initiative, under the purview of planetary defense, when FDL was provided the mandate by NASA's Planetary Defense Co-ordination Office (PDCO) to organize the competition. The CAMS AI pipeline is hosted on SpaceML.
- Visualization developed from the CAMS data showing the Perseid meteor shower was chosen as the Astronomy Picture of the Day

== See also ==
- Fireball Recovery and Interplanetary Observation Network
