= 2023 CX1 =

2023 meteoroid

2023 CX_{1}
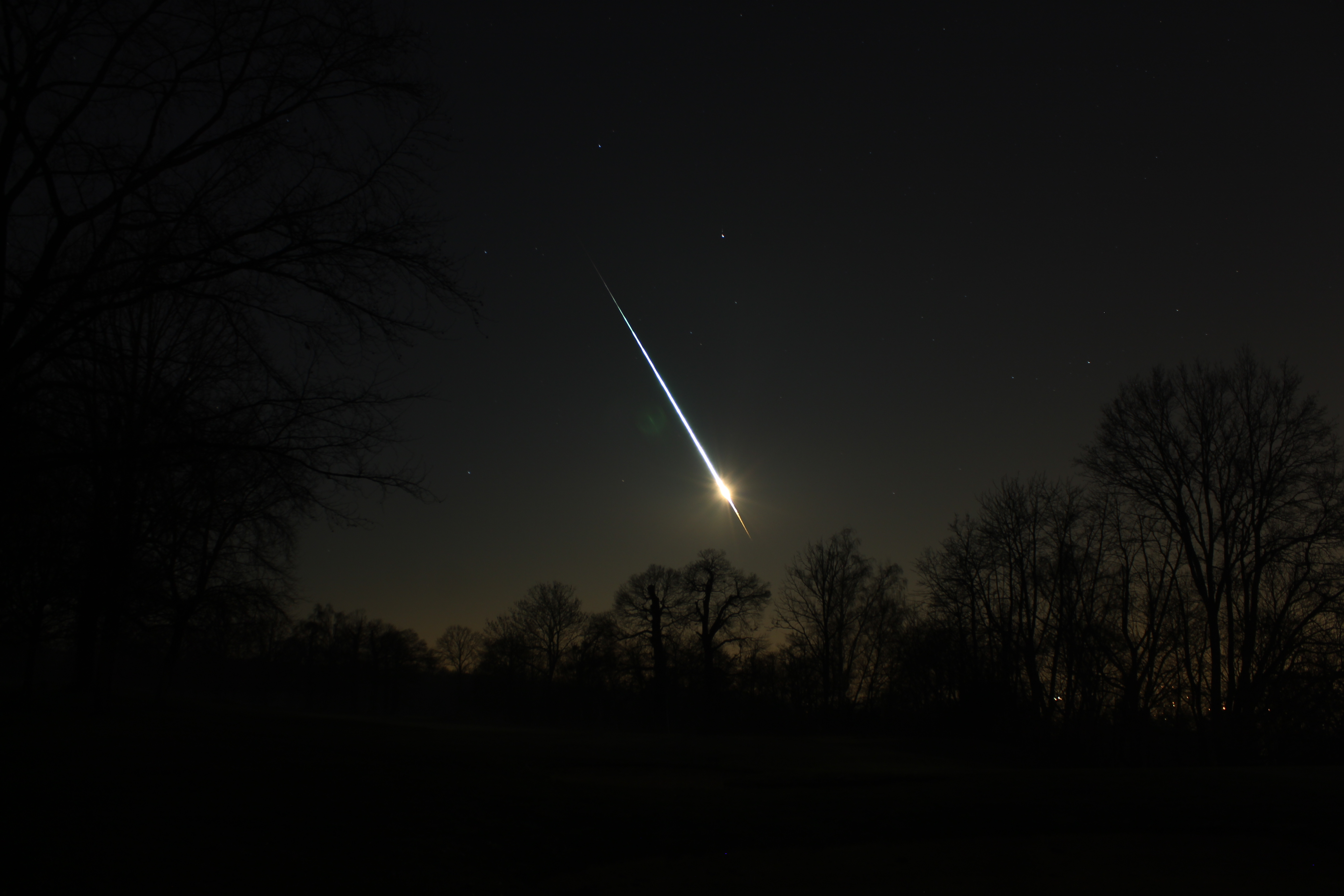
- Photograph of 2023 CX_{1} as it entered Earth's atmosphere over northern France on 13 February 2023

Discovery
- Discovered by: Krisztián Sárneczky
- Discovery site: Piszkéstető Stn.
- Discovery date: 12 February 2023

Designations
- Alternative designations: Sar2667
- Minor planet category: NEO · Apollo

Orbital characteristics
- Epoch 1 January 2023 (JD 2459945.5)
- Uncertainty parameter 5
- Observation arc: 6.57 hours (0.27 d)
- Aphelion: 2.337 AU
- Perihelion: 0.921 AU
- Semi-major axis: 1.629 AU
- Eccentricity: 0.4346
- Orbital period (sidereal): 2.08 yr (760 days)
- Mean anomaly: 325.105°
- Mean motion: 0° 28^{m} 25.982^{s} / day
- Inclination: 3.419°
- Longitude of ascending node: 323.870°
- Time of perihelion: 13 February 2021
- Argument of perihelion: 218.790°
- Earth MOID: 0.000111 AU (16,600 km; 0.043 LD)

Physical characteristics
- Mean diameter: ≈ 1 m
- Mass: ≈ 1000 kg
- Apparent magnitude: ≈ 13 (peak)
- Absolute magnitude (H): 32.645±0.512; 32.76

2023 CX_{1} was a metre-sized asteroid that entered Earth's atmosphere on 13 February 2023 02:59 UTC and disintegrated as a meteor over the coast of Normandy, France along the English Channel. It was discovered less than seven hours before impact, by Hungarian astronomer Krisztián Sárneczky at Konkoly Observatory's Piszkéstető Station in the Mátra Mountains, Hungary. 2023 CX_{1} is the seventh asteroid discovered before impacting Earth and successfully predicted, and the third of those for which meteorites have been recovered. Before it impacted, 2023 CX_{1} was a near-Earth asteroid on an Earth-crossing Apollo-type orbit.

== Discovery ==
During a routine search for near-Earth objects with his 60-centimetre (24 in) Schmidt telescope, Krisztián Sárneczky first imaged 2023 CX_{1} on 12 February 2023 at 20:18:07 UTC, when it was already less than 233,000 km (145,000 mi) from Earth and inside the orbit of the Moon at 0.61 lunar distances. At discovery, the asteroid had an apparent magnitude of 19.4 and moved quickly in the northern hemisphere sky, at an angular rate of 14 arcseconds per minute and a radial velocity of 9 km/s (32,400 km/h; 20,100 mph) towards Earth. Sárneczky immediately recognized it was a near-Earth object, but only realized it was on course for impact with Earth when he reobserved it half an hour later. Sárneczky gave the object the temporary designation Sar2667 and reported the discovery to the Minor Planet Center's (MPC's) Near-Earth Object Confirmation Page at 20:49 UTC, calling for further follow-up from other observatories around the world. Astronomers at Višnjan Observatory in Tičan, Croatia observed the asteroid starting at 21:03 UTC and confirmed that it was headed for impact with Earth.

The European Space Agency took notice of the asteroid's impending impact and alerted the public through social media. Astronomers around the world continuously observed the asteroid to refine its trajectory as it approached Earth and its impact location. The asteroid reached a peak brightness of magnitude 13 (about the brightness of Pluto) right before it entered Earth's shadow at around 02:50 UTC. It then faded dramatically and became invisible until it entered the atmosphere. The asteroid was last observed on 13 February 2023 02:52:07 UTC by Jost Jahn at the SATINO Remote Observatory in Haute Provence, France, just two minutes after it entered Earth's shadow and seven minutes before it impacted. At the time of that last observation, the asteroid had faded from magnitude 13 to 16 and moved extremely quickly at an angular rate of 1.7 degrees per minute, at a distance of approximately 11,100 km (6,900 mi) from Earth's center (4,700 km or 2,900 mi altitude (Note: Altitude is the difference between the geocentric distance and Earth's radius of 6,371 km (3,959 mi).)).

On 13 February 2023 04:13 UTC (one hour after the impact), MPC gave the asteroid its official minor planet provisional designation 2023 CX_{1}. At least 20 observatories observed 2023 CX_{1} and submitted astrometry to the MPC before impact, with over 300 astrometric positions recorded in total.

== Impact ==
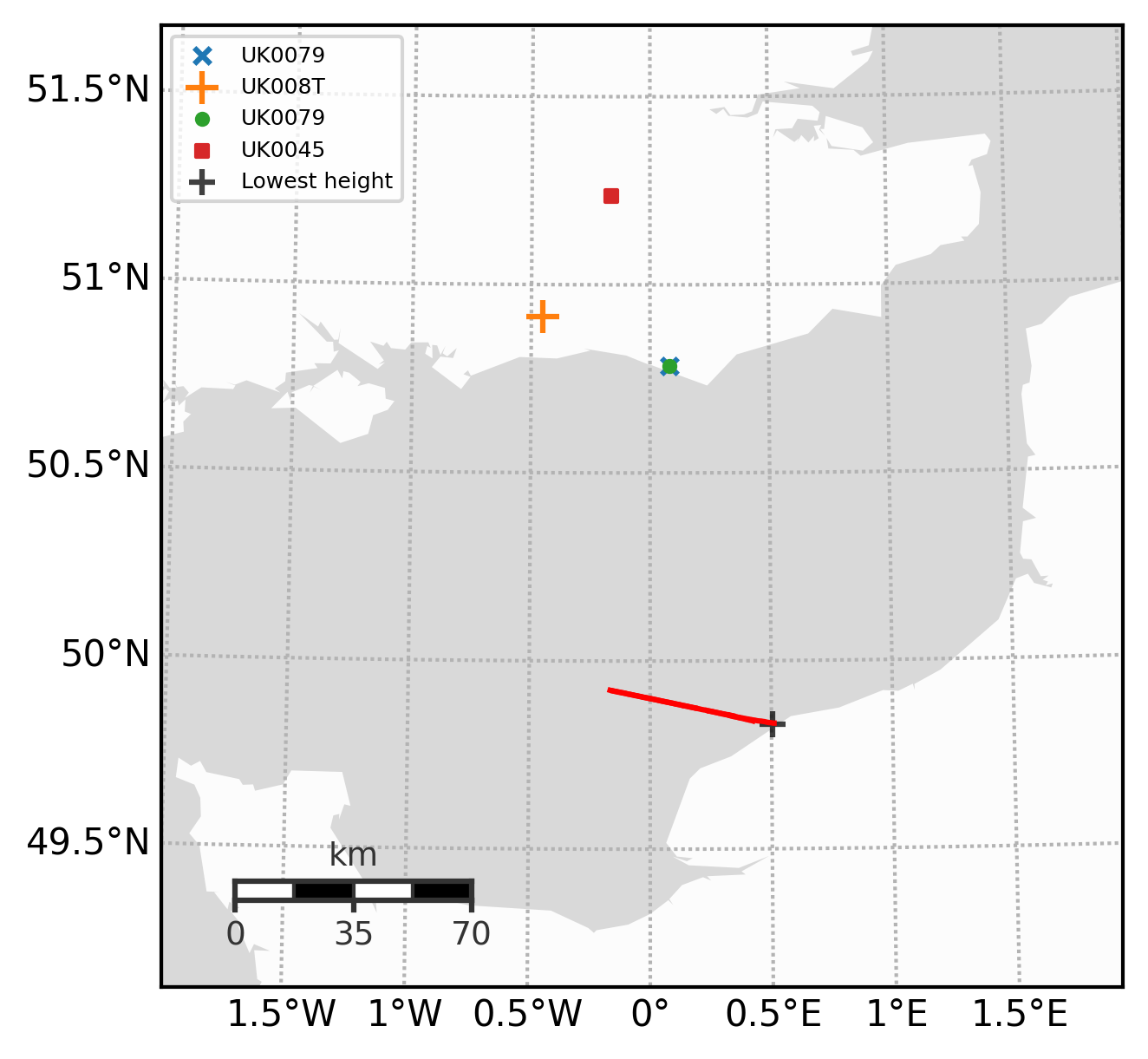
Flight path of 2023 CX_{1} plotted on a map, starting from the English Channel and ending at the coast of Normandy, France to the east.

At 02:59:21 UTC (local time 03:59:21 CET), 2023 CX_{1} entered the atmosphere at a velocity of 14.5 km/s (52,200 km/h; 32,436 mph) with an inclination 40–50° relative to the vertical. As the meteoroid travelled eastward over the English Channel to the coast of Normandy, France, it experienced significant atmospheric drag and began burning up as a bright meteor at an altitude of 89 km (55 mi). It was seen by witnesses from France, Great Britain, Belgium, Netherlands, and Germany. The meteor began fragmenting at an altitude of 29 km (18 mi) and then completely broke apart at 28 km (17 mi), producing a bright flash due to the rapid vaporization of its fragments. In the process, the meteor released a great amount of kinetic energy. That produced a shock wave, which was heard by some witnesses and was detected by French seismographs. The meteor disappeared at an altitude of 20 km (12 mi), after which its resulting meteorites continued falling in dark flight. Over 80 witness reports of the meteor were submitted to the International Meteor Organization (IMO).

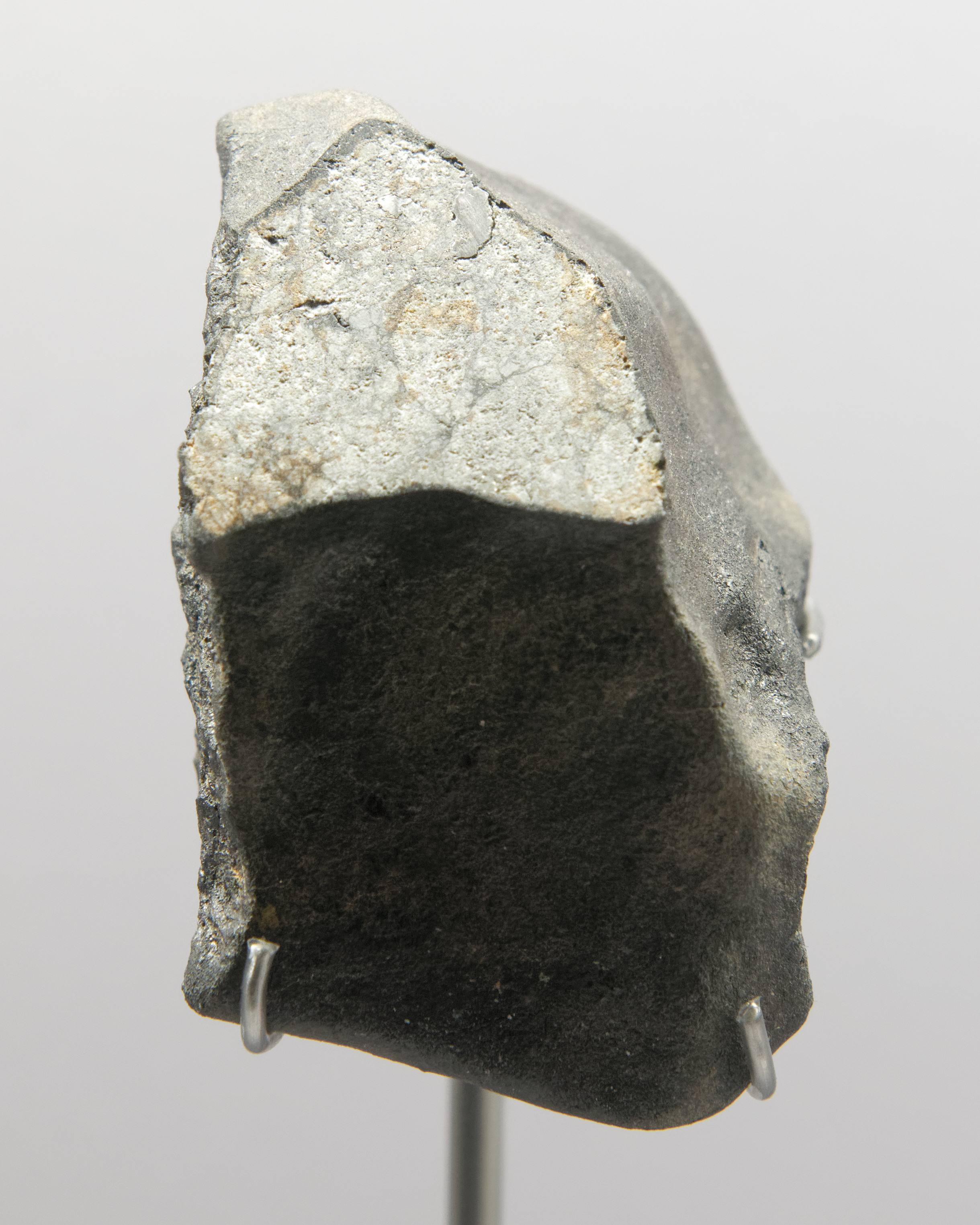
The 94g meteorite found by Loïs Leblanc

Upon breakup, 2023 CX_{1} dropped meteorites over the Normandy region and produced a strewn field spanning from Dieppe to Doudeville. Guided by Peter Jenniskens, researchers and citizen scientists of the Fireball Recovery and Interplanetary Observation Network (FRIPON) immediately began a coordinated search effort in the expected meteorite fall area. On 15 February 2023 15:47 UTC (local time 16:47 CET), FRIPON member and art student Loïs Leblanc found the first meteorite of 2023 CX_{1} in a field in the commune of Saint-Pierre-le-Viger. The meteorite weighed about 95 g (3.4 oz) and is described as a "dark stone." Late in the afternoon of the next day, Peter Jenniskens found a 3 g meteorite near the small-size end of the strewn field that confirmed the predicted center line. By March 2023, over 20 additional meteorites were recovered, with masses ranging 2 to 350 g (0.1 to 12.3 oz). The IMO estimates that 2023 CX_{1} could have dropped only one large meteorite up to ~2 kg (4.4 lb) in mass, plus an uncertain number of smaller meteorites up to several tens of grams each. The largest meteorite is expected to have landed near the commune of Vénestanville.

2023 CX_{1} is the seventh asteroid discovered before being successfully predicted to impact Earth, and also the third whose meteorites were collected after its predicted impact. It is Sárneczky's second discovery of an impacting asteroid, after 2022 EB5 which he discovered a year prior in March 2022.

== Orbit ==
Prior to impact, 2023 CX_{1} was on an Apollo-type orbit that crossed the orbits of Earth and Mars. It orbited the Sun at an average distance of 1.63 astronomical units (244×10^{6} km; 152×10^{6} mi), varying from 0.92 AU at perihelion to 2.34 AU at aphelion due to its eccentric orbit. The orbit had a low inclination of 3.4° with respect to the ecliptic and an orbital period of 2.08 years. The asteroid last passed perihelion on 13 February 2021 and impacted Earth before it was set to make its next perihelion on 15 March 2023.

The last time 2023 CX_{1} made a close approach to Earth was around 7 (± 1) June 2000, when it passed around 150–161 LD (58–62 million km; 36–38 million mi) from the planet. Before that, 2023 CX_{1} had made several distant close approaches with Earth and Mars during the 1900s, though it probably never approached within 10 LD (3.8 million km; 2.4 million mi) from these planets.

== See also ==
- Impact event
- Asteroid impact prediction
  - 2022 WJ1, the sixth asteroid discovered before being successfully predicted to impact Earth
  - 2024 RW1
  - 2024 UQ
- Meteorite fall
  - 2008 TC3, the first asteroid to have its meteorites collected after its predicted impact with Earth
  - 2018 LA, the second asteroid to have its meteorites collected after its predicted impact with Earth
  - 2024 BX1
