= Eb5 =

Eb5 or EB5 may refer to:

- EB-5 visa, an employment visa
- EB-5 Reform and Integrity Act, United States law pertaining to the visa
- 2022 EB5, an asteroid
