= 2014 AA =

Small asteroid which entered Earth's atmosphere in January 2014

- 2014 AA imaged by the Catalina Sky Survey in January 2014. The asteroid was around one lunar distance from Earth at that time.

Discovery
- Discovered by: Richard Kowalski; Mount Lemmon Survey (G96)
- Discovery date: 1 January 2014

Designations
- Minor planet category: Apollo; NEO

Orbital characteristics
- Epoch 1 January 2014 (JD 2456658.5)
- Uncertainty parameter 9
- Observation arc: ~70 minutes
- Aphelion: 1.4080 AU (210.63 Gm) (Q)
- Perihelion: 0.9163 AU (137.08 Gm) (q)
- Semi-major axis: 1.1623 AU (173.88 Gm) (a)
- Eccentricity: 0.2116 (e)
- Orbital period (sidereal): 1.25 yr (457.26 d)
- Mean anomaly: 324.1460° (M)
- Mean motion: 0° 47^{m} 14.244^{s} / day (n)
- Inclination: 1.4156° (i)
- Longitude of ascending node: 101.6086° (Ω)
- Time of perihelion: 15 February 2014 (would have been)
- Argument of perihelion: 52.3393° (ω)
- Earth MOID: 4.54412×10^{−7} AU (67.9791 km)
- Jupiter MOID: 3.58092 AU (535.698 Gm)

Physical characteristics
- Dimensions: ~3 meters (10 ft)
- Mass: ~4×10^{4} kg (assumed)
- Absolute magnitude (H): 30.9

2014 AA was a small Apollo near-Earth asteroid roughly 2–4 meters in diameter that struck Earth on 2 January 2014. It was discovered on 1 January 2014 by Richard Kowalski at the Mount Lemmon Survey at an apparent magnitude of 19 using a 1.52-meter (60 in) reflecting telescope at Mount Lemmon Observatory. 2014 AA was only observed over a short observation arc of about 70 minutes, and entered Earth's atmosphere about 21 hours after discovery. Nonetheless, it remains one of only a few asteroids observed before impact (see Asteroid impact prediction).

== Entry ==
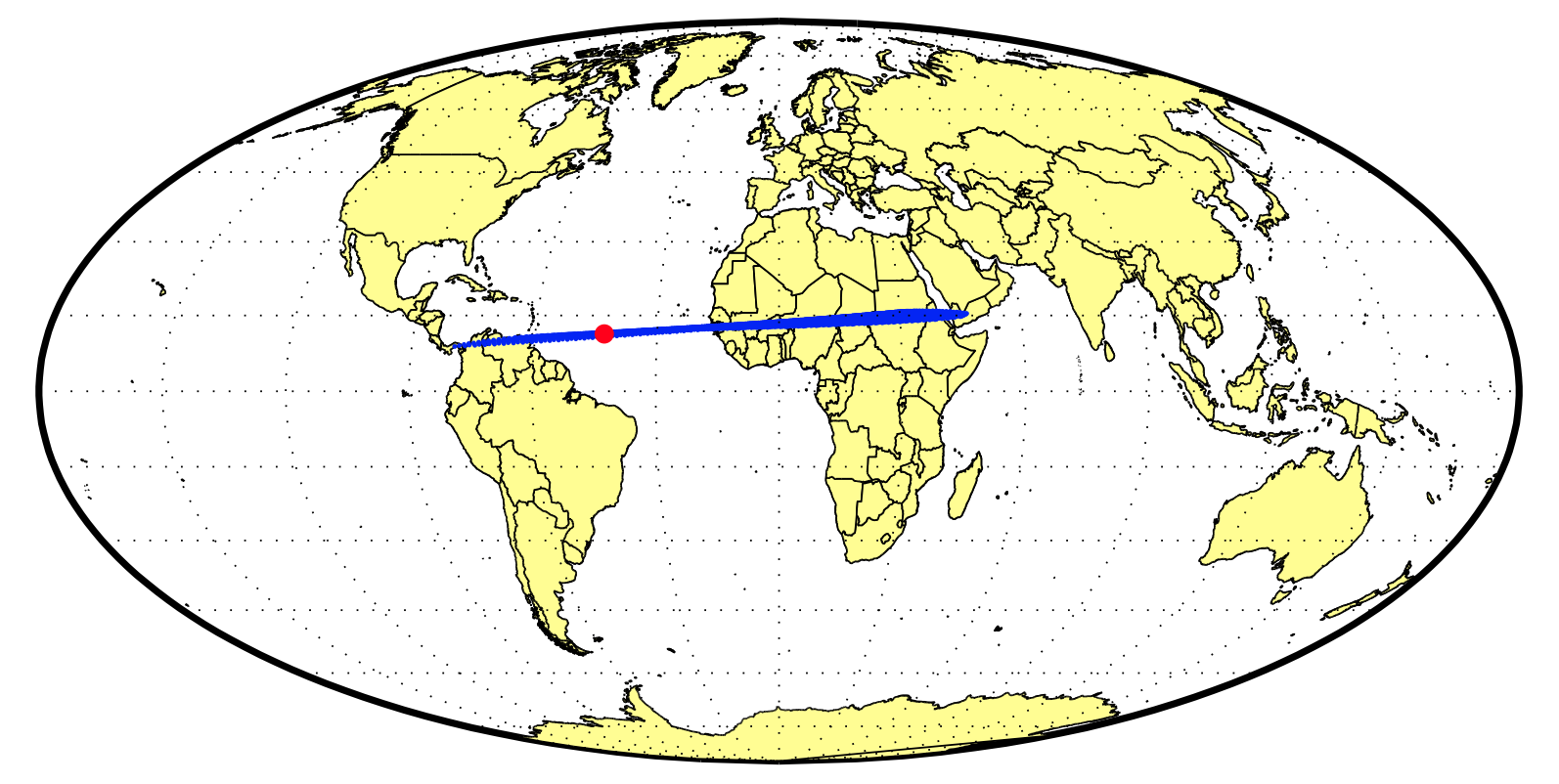
Probable impact location of near-Earth asteroid 2014 AA based on infrasound data from the Comprehensive Nuclear-Test-Ban Treaty Organization.

Animation of 2014 AA around the Sun Sun · Earth · 2014 AA

Using a poorly determined orbit, the JPL Small-Body Database listed a 3-sigma solution with impact occurring around 2 January 2014 02:33 UT ± 1 hour and 5 minutes. The Minor Planet Center listed impact as occurring around 2 January 2014 05:00 UT ± 10 hours. Independent calculations by Bill Gray, the Minor Planet Center and Steve Chesley at the Jet Propulsion Laboratory verified that impact was virtually certain. It entered the atmosphere going about 11.7 km/s with respect to Earth.

The impactor would have been roughly the size of 2008 TC3, which exploded above the Nubian Desert in Sudan on 7 October 2008. Calculations by Chesley suggest the impactor fell somewhere on an arc extending from Central America to East Africa, with a best-fit location just off the coast of West Africa. Calculations by Pasquale Tricarico using the nominal orbit show that 2014 AA entered Earth's shadow cone approximately 40 minutes before entering the atmosphere.

Infrasound was detected by three stations of the Comprehensive Nuclear-Test-Ban Treaty Organization. Peter Brown and Petrus Jenniskens located weak signals from infrasound stations in Bolivia, Brazil and Bermuda. 2014 AA entered Earth's atmosphere around 03:06 ± 5 min UT, 3,000 km from Caracas, Venezuela, far from any landmass. No ships or planes reported witnessing the event. A recalculation of the impact parameters of this meteor based on infrasound recordings puts it in the Atlantic Ocean about 1900 km (1030 nautical miles) east of Port of Spain in Trinidad, at a longitude of impact of nearly 44º west and a latitude of 11º north, the impact time being 2456659.618 JD UTC. Extensive numerical simulations indicate that, prior to impact, 2014 AA was subjected to a number of secular resonances and it may have followed a path similar to those of the NEOs 2011 GJ3, 2011 JV10, 2012 DJ54, and 2013 NJ4; NEOs in this transient group experience close encounters with the Earth-Moon system at perihelion and Mars at aphelion and could be a dynamical family.

== Other discoveries ==
Kowalski previously discovered 2008 TC3, the first asteroid discovered before Earth's impact, using the same telescope in October 2008. There are about a billion near-Earth objects in the size range of 2014 AA, and impacts of comparably-sized objects occur several times each year.

Several years later, 2018 LA was also discovered by the Mount Lemmon Survey, and ended up impacting Earth in southern Botswana in June 2018.

== See also ==
- Asteroid impact prediction
- 2008 TC3
- WT1190F
- 2018 LA
- 2019 MO
- 2022 EB5
- 2022 WJ1
