= WT1190F =

Small temporary satellite of Earth that impacted in 2015

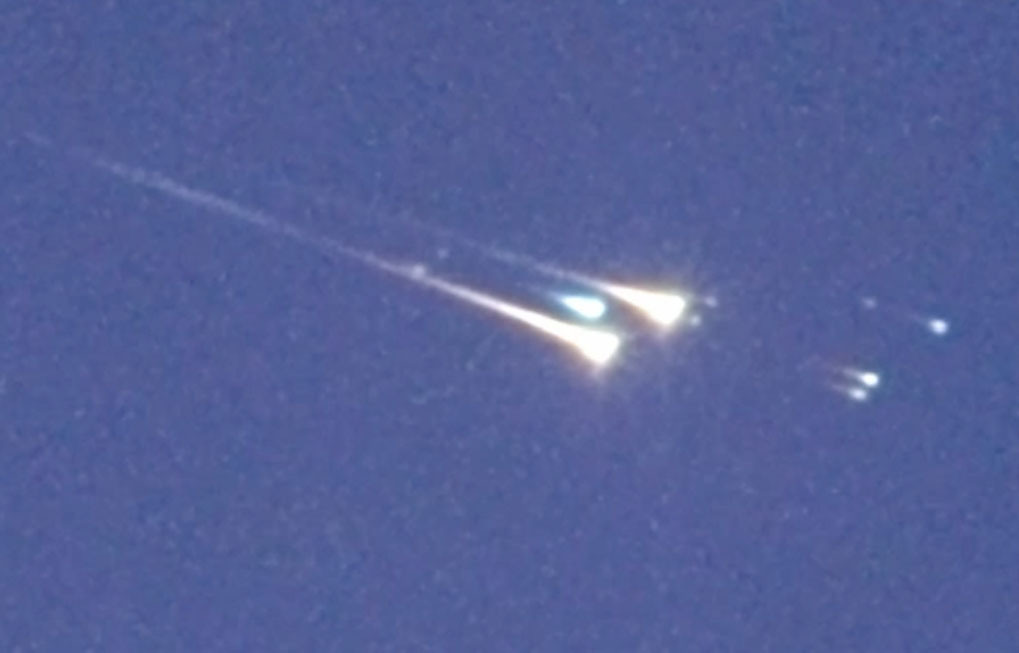
- WT1190F entering the atmosphere over Sri Lanka, viewed by the airborne observation team

Discovery
- Discovered by: Mount Lemmon Survey (G96); Catalina Sky Survey (703)
- Discovery date: 26 October 2009; 18 February 2013; 29 November 2013; 3 October 2015

Designations
- Alternative names: 9U01FF6; UDA34A3; UW8551D
- Minor planet category: Distant artificial satellite (before Jun 2009 to 13 November 2015)

Orbital characteristics
- Epoch 3 October 2015 (JD 2457298.5)
- Periapsis: 21,222 km (13,187 mi) (0.055 LD; 3.33 ER)
- Apoapsis: 655,374 km (407,231 mi) (1.704 LD, 102.75 ER)
- Semi-major axis: 338,298 km (210,209 mi) (0.880 LD, 53.04 ER)
- Eccentricity: 0.937269
- Orbital period (sidereal): 22.66 days
- Average orbital speed: 1.1 km/s @ 0.00226 AU
- Mean anomaly: 6.191°
- Inclination: 3.197°
- Longitude of ascending node: 311.556°
- Time of perihelion: 2 October 2015 14:39:00 UT
- Argument of perihelion: 314.044°
- Satellite of: Earth

Physical characteristics
- Dimensions: 0.7 to 2 meters (2 to 7 ft)
- Mass: 250 to 2,000 kilograms (550 to 4,400 lb)
- Mean density: ~0.10 g/cm^{3}
- Synodic rotation period: 0.75 seconds
- Albedo: >0.1
- Apparent magnitude: ~16–23
- Absolute magnitude (H): 31.3

WT1190F (9U01FF6, UDA34A3, or UW8551D) was a small temporary satellite of Earth that impacted Earth on 13 November 2015 at 06:18:21.7 (± 0.1 seconds) UTC. It is thought to have been space debris from the trans-lunar injection stage of the 1998 Lunar Prospector mission. It was first discovered on 18 February 2013 by the Catalina Sky Survey. It was then lost, and reacquired on 29 November 2013. It was again discovered on 3 October 2015 by astronomer Rose Garcia with the Catalina Sky Survey 60-inch telescope, and the object was soon identified to be the same as the two objects previously sighted by the team, who have been sharing their data through the International Astronomical Union's Minor Planet Center (MPC). An early orbit calculation showed that it was orbiting Earth in an extremely elliptical orbit, taking it from within the geosynchronous satellite ring to nearly twice the distance of the Moon. It was also probably the same object as 9U01FF6, another object on a similar orbit discovered on 26 October 2009.

WT1190F had been orbiting Earth as a temporary satellite (named UWAIS) since mid-2009, if not longer. While it has not been positively identified with any known artificial satellites, its estimated density of 0.1 g/cm^{3} was much lower than would be expected of a natural object as even water has a density of 1 g/cm^{3}. Hence, European Space Agency astronomers have concluded that the object was likely a fuel tank of some sort.

After more observations, astronomers determined that the object would impact Earth on 13 November 2015 at 06:18 UTC (11:48 local time), south of Sri Lanka. Due to its small size, it was expected that most or all of the object would burn up in the atmosphere before impacting, but would be visible as a bright daytime fireball if the sky was not badly overcast.

A ground-based observational campaign was organized as a possible test for future collision events involving also natural bodies.

== Observations ==
Bright object in the center is WT1190F as observed by the University of Hawaii 2.2-meter telescope.

WT1190F was first discovered by the Mount Lemmon Survey, a participant in the Catalina Sky Survey Near-Earth Object surveying program. The object was identified with an apparent magnitude 19.5 on 18 February 2013, and given the temporary designation UDA34A3, but was lost soon after, with an observation arc of only 5 hours. However, it was again seen by the same survey on 29 November 2013 and given the designation UW8551D and lost again, only being observed for 1 hour 35 minutes.

Most recently, it was recovered on 3 October 2015 and given the designation WT1190F. Its orbit was soon calculated and found to be orbiting Earth, but not with the orbit of any known artificial satellite. The object's orbit was soon connected, allowing more observations to be made, and several precovery observations have been found of the object, dating back to June 2009.

The type of orbit that WT1190F had was not stable long-term. An object in this type of orbit was likely to impact into Earth or the Moon, or acquire enough orbital speed to be ejected into orbit around the Sun. It was not likely that it had been orbiting Earth for decades. In 2011 the orbit had an eccentricity of 0.33 and perigee (closest approach to Earth) of 248,000 km (154,000 mi). It passed about 22,000 km (14,000 mi) from the Moon on 24 May 2012. By 2013 the eccentricity had increased to 0.70 and the perigee decreased to 105,000 km (65,000 mi).

Orbital evolution
Epoch	Eccentricity	Inclination	Perigee (km)	Apogee (km)
2011	0.33	59	248383	495045
2013	0.70	78	105639	598686
2015	0.94	3	21221	655374

During WT1190F's orbit, it changed significantly in brightness, from an apparent magnitude 16 at perigee, to magnitude 23 at apogee. It spent most of its time dimmer than magnitude 20. This, combined with solar pressure acceleration, the Yarkovsky effect, and frequent orbital perturbations by the Moon, made it difficult to precisely predict its orbit and location. About one hour before atmospheric entry, the object had a R magnitude of 13.6, (Note: Even near apparent magnitude ~13.6 it was about 1000 times too faint to be seen by the naked eye. Math: $(\sqrt[5]{100})^{13.6-6}\approx 1000$) roughly the brightness of Pluto.

=== Impact ===
WT1190F made atmospheric entry at 11 kilometers per second (25,000 miles per hour). Whatever was left from the re-entry was calculated to have fallen into the ocean about 100 kilometres (62 mi) from Galle, Sri Lanka. The closest approach to Galle occurred during atmospheric flight when the object had an altitude of 45 km and a distance of 51 km. For observers in Colombo, Sri Lanka, the object started out 30 degrees above the horizon coming in from slightly south of due west. Its mass was not sufficient to cause any risk to the area, but the event still produced a bright fireball. Scientists wanted to study WT1190F to better understand the trajectory and atmospheric entry of satellites, debris, and small asteroids from translunar orbit. The International Astronomical Center (IAC) and the United Arab Emirates Space Agency utilized a Gulfstream 450 jet to study the re-entry from above the clouds and haze. The airborne observation team successfully captured the re-entry on video.

Impact approach
Date	vmag	Distance (km)	Velocity wrt Earth (km/s)
05	20.8	602399	0.2
08	20.5	524608	0.5
10	20.0	420800	0.8
11	19.6	345999	1.0
12	19.0	246196	1.4
13	17.1	89914	2.8
Impact	~ –6	0	11.3

=== Airborne observations ===
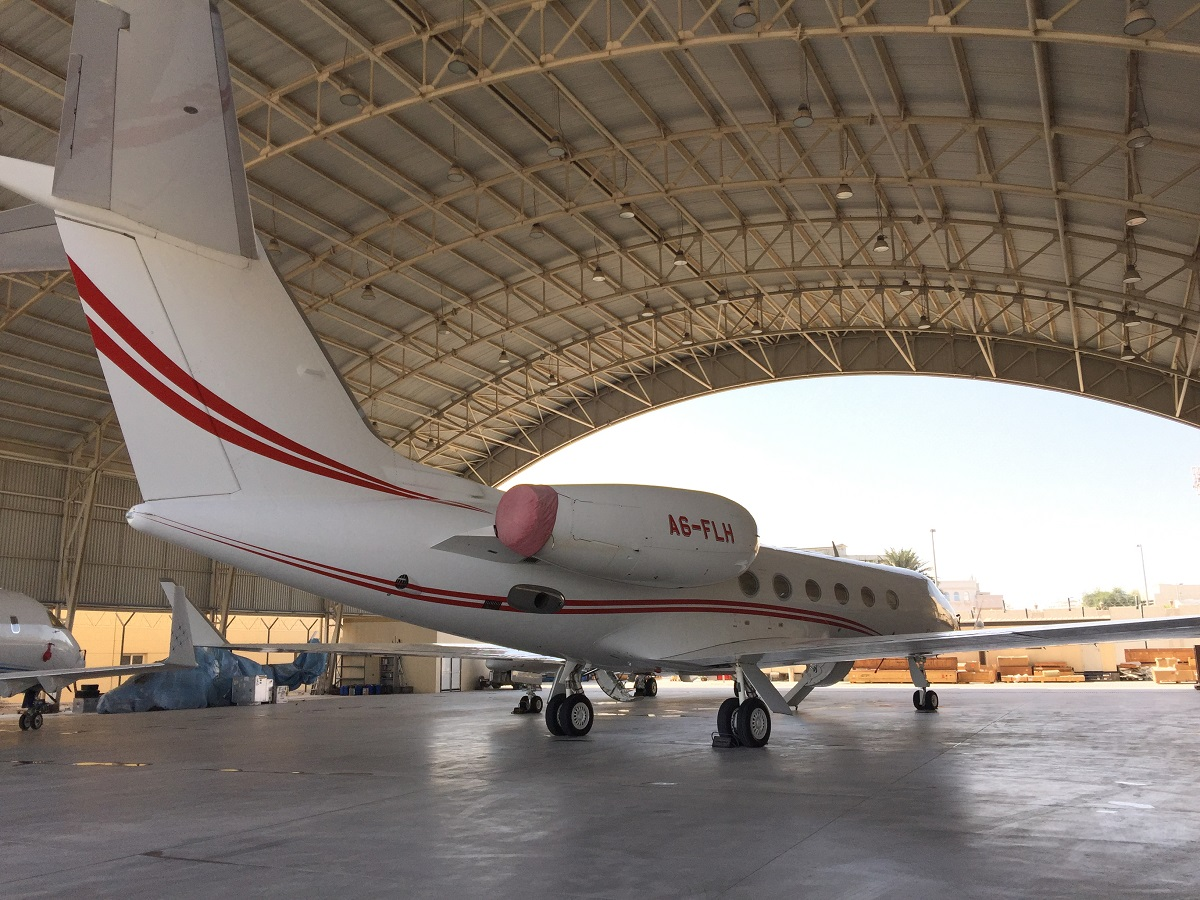
Gulfstream 450 business jet rented for the mission

The International Astronomical Center (IAC) and the United Arab Emirates Space Agency observed WT1190F as it fell towards the Earth. The IAC chartered a Gulfstream 450 jet to bring researchers such as Peter Jenniskens to the area of WT1190F's impact, at a high altitude, to view the event over clouds or haze. The Next TC3 Consortium Asteroid Detection and Early Warning team narrowed the atmospheric entry time to ± 1.3 seconds.

Observers on the ground could not see the fireball because of rain, but the plane was able to find an opening in the clouds. The fireball was a bright naked eye object. Spectroscopic data was acquired to determine what the object was made of, and the results published.

== See also ==
- List of reentering space debris

=== Impacts by known objects ===
- 2008 TC_{3}
- 2014 AA
- 2018 LA
- 2019 MO

=== Previous temporary satellites ===
- 2006 RH120
- 6Q0B44E
- J002E3
