= Abidiya =

Abidiya العبيدية
- Location in Sudan
- Coordinates: 18°14′0″N 33°57′0″E
- Country: Sudan

Abidiya (Arabic: العبيدية) is a town near the Nubian Desert in River Nile (state) of north-east Sudan.

== History ==
In July 2022, Russia was caught plundering gold from a processing plant near Abidiya to support its war in Ukraine.
