= Peter Jenniskens =

Dutch astronomer

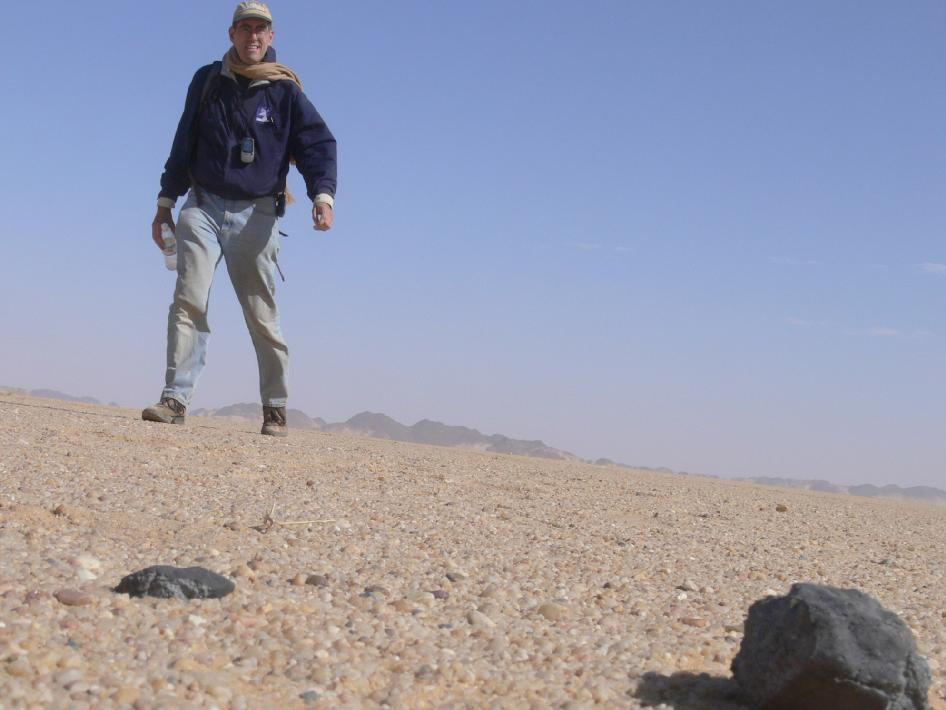
- Jenniskens in the Nubian Desert, February 2009
- Born: 1962 (age 63–64); Meterik, Limburg, Netherlands
- Education: M.S. Leiden University (1988); Ph.D. Leiden University (1992)
- Occupations: Astronomer, Explorer; SETI Institute; NASA Ames Research Center

Petrus Matheus Marie (Peter) Jenniskens (born 1962 in Meterik) is a Dutch-American astronomer and a senior research scientist at the Carl Sagan Center of the SETI Institute and at NASA Ames Research Center. He is an expert on meteor showers, and wrote the book Meteor Showers and their Parent Comets, published in 2006 and Atlas of Earth’s Meteor Showers, published in 2023. He is past president of Commission 22 of the International Astronomical Union (2012–2015) and was chair of the Working Group on Meteor Shower Nomenclature (2006–2012) after it was first established. Asteroid 42981 Jenniskens is named in his honor.

In 2008, Jenniskens, together with Muawia Shaddad, led a team from the University of Khartoum in Sudan that recovered fragments of asteroid 2008 TC3 in the Nubian Desert, marking the first time meteorite fragments had been found from an object that was previously tracked in outer space before hitting Earth.

== NASA Multi-Instrument Aircraft Campaigns ==
=== Meteor showers ===
Since October 2010, Jenniskens has developed the global Cameras for All-Sky Meteor Surveillance (CAMS) project to map our meteor showers. Meteor showers are detected by triangulating the path of meteors recorded in a low-light video camera surveillance of the night sky displayed at meteorshowers.seti.org.

Jenniskens is the principal investigator of NASA's Leonid Multi-Instrument Aircraft Campaign (Leonid MAC), a series of four airborne missions that fielded modern instrumental techniques to study the 1998 – 2002 Leonids meteor storms. These missions helped develop meteor storm prediction models, detected the signature of organic matter in the wake of meteors as a potential precursor to origin-of-life chemistry, and discovered many new aspects of meteor radiation.

More recent meteor shower missions include the Aurigid Multi-Instrument Aircraft Campaign (Aurigid MAC), which studied a rare September 1, 2007, outburst of Aurigids from long-period comet C/1911 N1 (Kiess), and the Quadrantid Multi-Instrument Aircraft Campaign (Quadrantid MAC), which studied the January 3, 2008, Quadrantids.

Jenniskens identified several important mechanisms of how our meteor showers originate. Since 2003, Jenniskens identified the Quadrantids parent body 2003 EH1, and several others, as new examples of how fragmenting comets are the dominant source of meteor showers. These objects are now recognized as the main source of our zodiacal dust cloud. Before that, he predicted and observed the 1995 Alpha Monocerotids meteor outburst (with members of the Dutch Meteor Society), proving that "stars fell like rain at midnight" because the dust trails of long-period comets wander on occasion in Earth's path.

=== Spacecraft reentries ===
His research also includes artificial meteors. Jenniskens is the principal investigator of NASA's Genesis and Stardust Entry Observing Campaigns to study the fiery return from interplanetary space of the Genesis (September 2004), Stardust (January 2006), and Hayabusa (June 2010) sample return capsules. The beautiful reentry of JAXA's Hayabusa probe over Australia on 13 June 2010 also included the disintegrating main spacecraft. These airborne missions studied what physical conditions the protective heat shield endured during the reentry before being recovered.

More recently, Jenniskens led a mission to study the destructive entry of ESA's Automated Transfer Vehicle Jules Verne on 29 September 2008, Orbital ATK's Cygnus OA6 reentry on 22 June 2016, and the spectacular daytime re-entry of space debris object WT1190F near Sri-Lanka to practice a future observation of an impacting asteroid.

== Small asteroid impacts and meteorite recovery ==
=== 2023 CX1 fragments recovery ===
In 2023, small asteroid 2023 CX1 was spotted in space and four hours prior to impact announced as a likely impactor. When the final trajectory showed that meteorites would have fallen over land in Normandy, France, Jenniskens joined Francois Colas of IMCCE/Paris Observatory and other researchers and citizen scientists of FRIPON/Vigie-Ciel and guided the group to their first recovery of a 95g meteorite later that day. The next day, Jenniskens found the second meteorite, with a mass of 3 gram, the location of which verified the wind drift to which small meteorites were exposed. This established the location of the meteorite strewn field. In subsequent weeks, over 20 more meteorites were found with masses in the range 2g to 350g.

=== 2018 LA fragments recovery ===
In 2018, a second asteroid 2018 LA was spotted in space and tracked to an impact over land. Working with Oliver Moses of the Okavango Research Institute of the University of Maun, Jenniskens triangulated the fall from video records to an area in the Central Kalahari Game Reserve. Moses and Jenniskens then joined Alexander Proyer of BUIST and Mohutsiwa Gabadirwe of the Botswana Geoscience Institute in a search expedition, which led to the recovery of an 18 gram fragment on June 23, 2018. Twenty-two more meteorites were found in October that year. In 2021, the results from the international 2018 LA meteorite consortium study was published, tracing the fragments of asteroid 2018 LA to an impact crater on Vesta.

=== 2008 TC_{3} fragments recovery ===
The recovery of fragments of asteroid 2008 TC3 marked the first time fragments had been found from an object that was previously tracked in outer space before hitting Earth. This search was led by Peter Jenniskens and Muawia Shaddad of the University of Khartoum in Sudan, and carried out with help from students and staff of the University of Khartoum. The search of the impact zone began on December 6, 2008, and turned up 24 pounds (11 kg) of rocks in about 600 fragments. This also proved the first well documented recovery of many different meteorite types from a single fall.

=== Sutter's Mill ===
The next biggest impact over land occurred in California's gold country on April 22, 2012. One of the fragments landed at Sutter's Mill, the very site where gold was first discovered in 1848 that led to the California Gold Rush. Jenniskens found one of three fragments of this CM chondrite on April 24, before rains hit the area. The rapid recovery was made possible because Doppler weather radar detected the falling meteorites. A consortium study led by Jenniskens traced these meteorites back to a source region in the asteroid belt: a family of asteroids that move at low inclination and are close to the 3:1 mean-motion resonance with Jupiter. These were the first CM chondrites to be recovered from near the surface of the original parent body before it broke up, creating the asteroid family.

=== Novato ===
Half a year later, in the evening of October 17, 2012, a bright fireball was seen near San Francisco. The first Novato meteorite, an L6 type chondrite fragmental breccia, was found by Novato resident Lisa Webber following Jenniskens' publication of the trajectory of the fireball from video recorded by stations of his Cameras for Allsky Meteor Surveillance project (CAMS).

=== Chelyabinsk ===
Three weeks after the February 15, 2013, Chelyabinsk meteor, Jenniskens participated in a Russian Academy of Sciences fact finding mission to Chelyabinsk Oblast. Over 50 villages were visited to map the extent of the glass damage. Traffic video records were collected to map the shock wave arrival times. In order to determine the meteoroid entry speed and angle, star background calibration images were taken and shadow obstacle dimensions were measured at sites where video cameras recorded the fireball and its shadows. Eyewitnesses were interviewed to learn about injuries, heat sensations, sunburn, smells and where meteorites were found. Meteorites found shortly after the fall by Chelyabinsk State University colleagues were analyzed and the results from this consortium study were published inScience.

== Other research ==
In earlier collaborations, he discovered that an unusual viscous form of liquid water can be a common form of amorphous ice in comets and icy satellites (during a post-doc study with David F. Blake) and he created the first broad detection-limited survey of Diffuse Interstellar Bands in his PhD thesis work with Xavier Désert.
