= Blanpain =

Blanpain is a surname. Notable people with this surname include:

- Benoît Blanpain (born 20th century), scout commissioner in Belgium
- Cédric Blanpain (born 1970), Belgian researcher

== See also ==
- 289P/Blanpain, a comet discovered by Jean-Jacques Blanpain
