= Catalina Sky Survey =

Project to discover comets, asteroids, and near-Earth objects

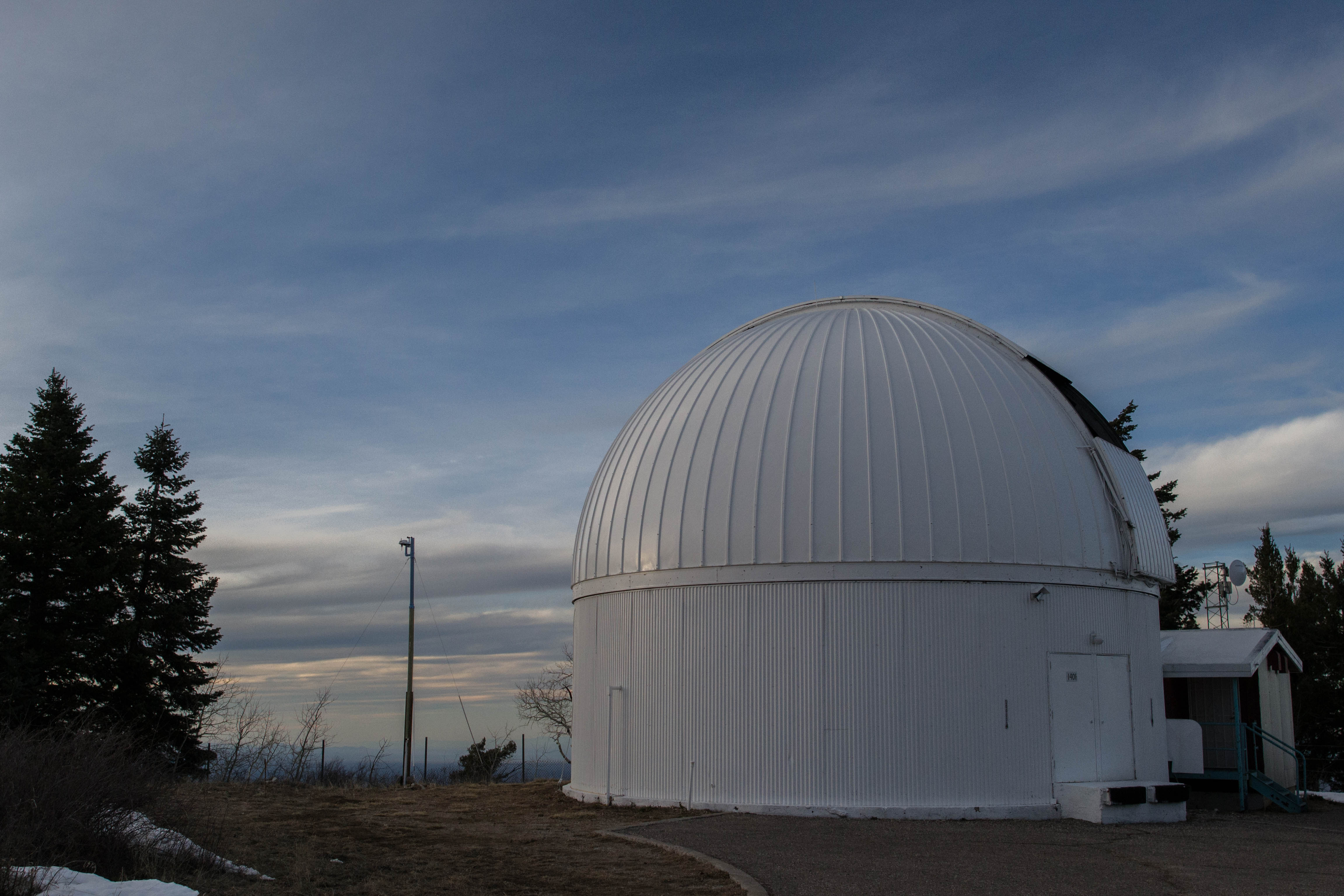
- The 1.52-meter telescope facility, one of three telescopes used by the CSS
- Alternative names: CSS
- Coordinates: 32°25′01″N 110°43′59″W
- Website: catalina.lpl.arizona.edu

Minor planets discovered: 25602
see § List of discovered minor planets

Catalina Sky Survey (CSS; obs. codes: 703 and G96) is an astronomical survey to discover comets and asteroids. It is conducted at the Steward Observatory's Catalina Station, located near Tucson, Arizona, in the United States.

The Catalina Sky Survey (CSS) is an astronomical survey conducted at the Steward Observatory’s Catalina Station near Tucson, Arizona, United States. It searches primarily for near‑Earth objects (NEOs), including potentially hazardous asteroids and comets, in support of NASA’s Near‑Earth Object Observations Program and a 1998 Congressional directive to identify large Earth‑crossing bodies. The survey uses three telescopes on Mount Lemmon and Mount Bigelow: a 1.5‑meter telescope (MPC code G96), a 0.68‑meter Schmidt telescope (MPC code 703), and a 1‑meter follow‑up telescope (MPC code I52), which together scan large areas of the sky each night to detect faint, moving minor planets. Since 2005 CSS has been the most prolific NEO‑discovery program, credited with the detection of over 25,000 minor planets and a large fraction of the known near‑Earth asteroid population.

== Mission ==
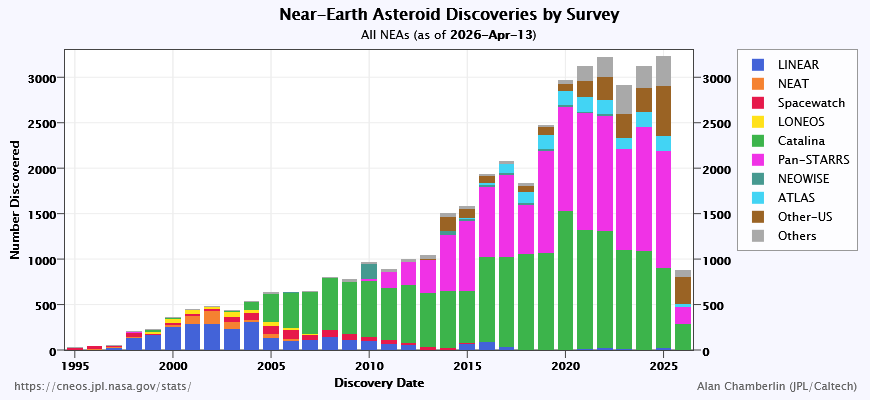
Number of NEOs detected by various projects: LINEAR; NEAT; Spacewatch; LONEOS / CSS; Pan-STARRS; NEOWISE; All others

The NEO Observations Program is a result of a United States 1998 congressional directive to NASA to begin a program to identify objects 1 kilometer (0.62 miles) or larger to a confidence level of 90% or better. The Catalina Sky Survey, located at the Mount Lemmon Observatory in the Catalina Mountains north of Tucson, carries out searches for near-earth objects (NEOs), contributing to the congressionally-mandated goal.

In addition to identifying impact risks, the project also obtains other scientific information, including: improving the known population distribution in the main belt, finding the cometary distribution at larger perihelion distances, determining the distribution of NEOs as a product of collisional history and transport to the inner Solar System, and identifying potential targets for flight projects.

== Techniques ==
The Catalina Sky Survey (CSS) uses three telescopes, a 1.5-meter (59 in) f/1.6 telescope on the peak of Mount Lemmon (MPC code G96), a 68 cm (27 in) f/1.7 Schmidt telescope near Mount Bigelow (MPC code 703), and a 1-meter (39 in) f/2.6 follow-up telescope also on Mount Lemmon (MPC code I52). The three telescopes are located in the Santa Catalina Mountains near Tucson, Arizona. The CSS southern hemisphere counterpart, the Siding Spring Survey (SSS), used a 0.5-meter (20 in) f/3 Uppsala Schmidt telescope at Siding Spring Observatory in Australia. The 1.5-meter and 68-cm survey telescopes use identical, thermo-electrically cooled cameras and common software written by the CSS team. The cameras are cooled to approximately −100 °C (−148 °F) so their dark current is about 1 electron per hour. These 10,560×10,560-pixel cameras provide a field of view of 5 square degrees with the 1.5-m telescope and nearly 20 square degrees with the Catalina Schmidt. Nominal exposures are 30 seconds and the 1.5-m can reach objects fainter than 21.5 V in that time. The 1-meter follow-up telescope uses a 2000×2000-pixel CCD detector which provides a field of view of 0.3 square degrees. Starting in 2019, CSS started using the 1.54-meter (61 in) Kuiper telescope situated on Mt. Bigelow for targeted follow-up for 7–12 nights per lunation.

CSS typically operates every clear night with the exception of a few nights centered on the full moon. The southern hemispheres' SSS in Australia ended in 2013 after funding was discontinued.

== Discoveries ==
In 2005, CSS became the most prolific NEO survey, surpassing Lincoln Near-Earth Asteroid Research (LINEAR) in total number of NEOs and potentially hazardous asteroids discovered each year since. As of 2020, the Catalina Sky Survey is responsible for the discovery of 47% of the total known NEO population.

=== Notable discoveries ===
Minor planet	Discovery date	Description
2006 JY26	May 6, 2006	Nearly missed the Moon and the Earth on May 9–10, 2006, and may impact the Earth on May 3, 2073.
2007 WD5	November 20, 2007	Nearly missed Mars on January 9, 2008
2008 TC3	October 6, 2008	Struck Earth on October 7, 2008
2012 XE133	December 12, 2012	Currently a temporary co-orbital of Venus.
2014 AA	January 1, 2014	Struck Earth on January 2, 2014.
2018 LA	June 2, 2018	Struck Earth on June 2, 2018.
2024 RW1	September 4, 2024	Struck Earth on September 4, 2024.

=== List of discovered minor planets ===
For a complete listing of all minor planets discovered by the Catalina Sky Survey, see the index section in list of minor planets.

== CSS/SSS team ==
The CSS team is headed by D. Carson Fuls of the Lunar and Planetary Laboratory of the University of Arizona.

The full CSS team is:

- D. Carson Fuls (principal investigator)
- Stephen M. Larson
- Alex R. Gibbs
- Albert D. Grauer
- Richard E. Hill (Retired)
- Richard A. Kowalski
- Joshua Hogan
- Hannes Gröller
- Frank Shelly
- Cameron Loewen
- David Rankin
- Gregory J. Leonard
- Rob Seaman
- Vivian Carvajal
- Tracie Beuden
- Savannah Smith
- Alessandra Serrano
- Kacper Wierzchos

=== SSS ===
- Robert H. McNaught
- Gordon J. Garradd

== Educational outreach ==
The CSS has helped with Astronomy Camp by showing campers how they detect NEOs. They even played a role in an astrophotography exercise with the 2006 Adult Astronomy Camp ending up with a picture that was featured on Astronomy Picture of the Day.

=== Catalina Outer Solar System Survey ===
The Zooniverse project Catalina Outer Solar System Survey is a citizen science project and is listed as a NASA citizen science project. In this project, the volunteers search for trans-Neptunian objects (TNOs) in pre-processed images of the Catalina Sky Survey. Computers can detect the motion of TNOs, but humans must check whether this motion is real. Upon agreement with the volunteers, they will be cited as "measurers" in the submission of the astrometry to the Minor Planet Center. The project already found previously known TNOs, including 47171 Lempo, (445473) 2010 VZ98, and (144897) 2004 UX10.

=== The Daily Minor Planet ===
The Zooniverse project The Daily Minor Planet is a citizen science project that is funded by a grant from NASA. In this project volunteers search for asteroids in images from the Catalina Sky Survey's 1.5-m survey telescope. Computer algorithms detect the motion of asteroids, but volunteers must check whether this motion is of a real object. Volunteers can be cited as "measurers" in the submission of the astrometry to the Minor Planet Center. The project has already found several new near earth objects, including 2023 VN3, 2023 TW, 2024 SN3, 2025 HD3, and 2025 KU1.

== See also ==
- Asteroid Zoo
- Astronomical survey
- Large Synoptic Survey Telescope
- Minor Planet Center (MPC)
- Planetary Data System (PDS)
- Spaceguard
- Asteroid Terrestrial-impact Last Alert System
- List of near-Earth object observation projects
