= 2022 WJ1 =

Meteoroid that impacted near Ontario, Canada in November 2022

2022 WJ_{1}
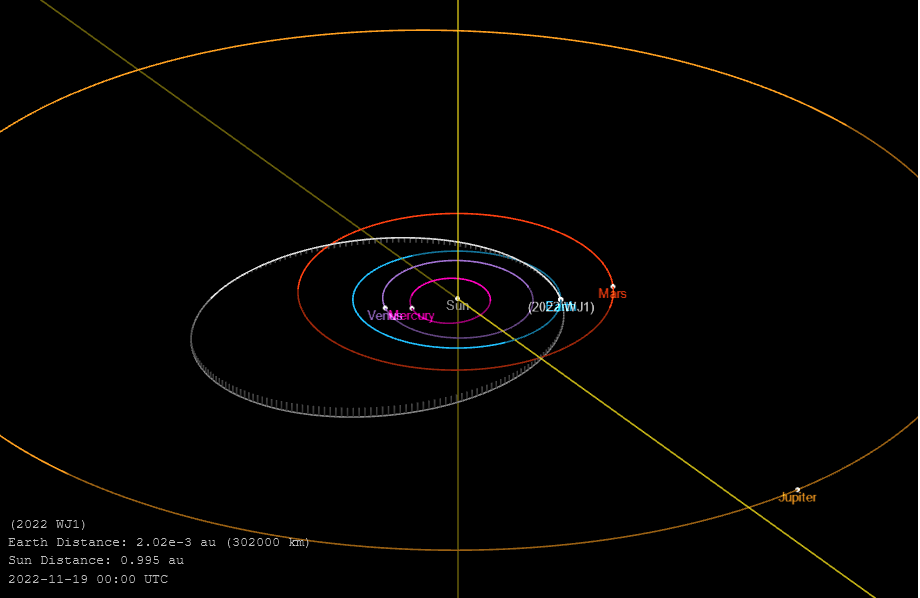
- Orbit before impact

Discovery
- Discovered by: David Rankin (Mt. Lemmon Srvy)
- Discovery site: Mt. Lemmon Obs.
- Discovery date: 19 November 2022

Designations
- Alternative designations: C8FF042
- Minor planet category: NEO · Apollo

Orbital characteristics
- Epoch 9 August 2022 (JD 2459800.5)
- Uncertainty parameter 6
- Observation arc: 3.04 hours
- Aphelion: 2.817 AU
- Perihelion: 0.928 AU
- Semi-major axis: 1.872 AU
- Eccentricity: 0.5043
- Orbital period (sidereal): 2.56 yr (935.9 days)
- Mean anomaly: 310.198°
- Mean motion: 0° 23^{m} 4.778^{s} / day
- Inclination: 2.582°
- Longitude of ascending node: 56.748°
- Time of perihelion: May 2020 (last perihelion); 16 December 2022 (would have been)
- Argument of perihelion: 35.034°
- Earth MOID: 0.000256 AU (38,300 km; 0.100 LD) (Note: Earth MOID as defined for 9 August 2022 roughly 100 days before Earth approach.)
- Jupiter MOID: 2.418 AU

Physical characteristics
- Mean diameter: 0.4 – 0.6 m
- Geometric albedo: 0.15 – 0.35
- Apparent magnitude: ≈31 @ 0.2 AU ≈15 (before entering Earth's shadow)
- Absolute magnitude (H): 33.554±0.363

2022 WJ_{1} was a harmless, approximately 1-metre meteoroid that impacted Earth's atmosphere on 19 November 2022 at 08:27 UT in Southern Ontario, Canada, above the Golden Horseshoe region, southwest of Toronto. A fireball was widely visible. Meteorites were also detected by weather radar during dark flight.

It was the 6th meteoroid/asteroid in history to be discovered before impact.

== Discovery ==
The asteroid was discovered three hours before impact by David Rankin at Mount Lemmon Observatory, during routine observations for the Mount Lemmon Survey. The first image was taken at 04:53 UT when the asteroid was 0.000859 AU (128.5 thousand km; 79.8 thousand mi; 0.334 LD) from Earth. Using the first four images of the asteroid, Scout estimated a 25% chance of an Earth impact. The next four images raised the chance to 50%. Within about an hour, further observations raised the chance of impact to 100%. The final observation was from Mauna Kea, 32 minutes before impact, just before it entered Earth's shadow. The asteroid brightened to about apparent magnitude 15 (about the brightness of Pluto) before disappearing into Earth's shadow.

It was the sixth successfully-predicted asteroid impact. (Note: The other five predicted impactors are: 2008 TC3, 2014 AA, 2018 LA, 2019 MO, and 2022 EB5.) With an absolute magnitude of 33.6, it was the smallest asteroid discovered while it was in space.

== Impact ==
A meteorite fall was presumed to have occurred along the south shores of Lake Ontario, from east of Grimsby to Niagara-on-the-Lake with most meteorites landing in the water. Larger fragments would have fallen farther to the east. During dark flight, weather radar signatures appeared from an altitude of ~15 km down to 850 metres. Meteorites should have a fresh black fusion crust. Most findable fragments would likely be around 5 grams and the size of a nickel. The main mass might be the size of a soccer ball and be located between Port Weller and Virgil.

There was also an observed ordinary chondrite meteorite fall in Grimsby at 01:03 UT 26 September 2009 with 13 recovered meteorites totaling 215 grams (the main mass was 69 grams). The 2009 fall has a strewn field of 8 km x 4 km.

The Minor Planet Center noted that Earth's atmosphere was impacted above Brantford 70 km from Grimsby. The resulting sonic boom was mostly heard in Hamilton while the fireball was visible to observers in the Greater Toronto Area and as far as the U.S. states of Maryland, Ohio, Pennsylvania, and New York.

Simulated final trajectory estimate from JPL Horizons with 1 minute markers CST (UT-6hr) and lines down to surface.	View from sunlit side of Earth. Without Earth's gravity, 2022 WJ_{1}'s trajectory would have missed Earth. Red markers show inside Earth's shadow.

== Orbit ==
The Apollo asteroid was inbound approaching a mid-December perihelion (closest approach to the Sun) when it impacted Earth. Even at opposition on 15 October 2022 when 2022 WJ_{1} was 0.2 AU (30 million km; 78 LD) from Earth, it had an unobservable apparent magnitude of 31 which is about 600 times too faint to be detected by even the most sensitive automated allsky surveys. (Note: Math: $(\sqrt[5]{100})^{31-24}\approx 630$)

2022 WJ_{1} orbited from inside Earth's orbit with perihelion at 0.92 AU to the middle of the asteroid belt at 2.8 AU.

Animation of 2022 WJ_{1} around the Sun 2022 WJ_{1} · Earth · Mars · Sun

== See also ==
- Asteroid impact prediction
- Impact event
- 2022 EB5, the first predicted asteroid impact in 2022
