= Benoît Blanpain =

Belgian scouting leader

General Commissioner of Les Scouts - Fédération des Scouts Baden-Powell de Belgique

Benoît Blanpain served as the General Commissioner of Les Scouts - Fédération des Scouts Baden-Powell de Belgique (FSC), the Catholic Baden-Powell-Scout Federation of Belgium, as well as the Secretary General of the International Catholic Conference of Scouting.

In 1996, Blanpain was awarded the 246th Bronze Wolf, the only distinction of the World Organization of the Scout Movement, awarded by the World Scout Committee for exceptional services to world Scouting.
