= 2008 TC3 =

2008 asteroid-type meteoroid

2008 TC_{3}
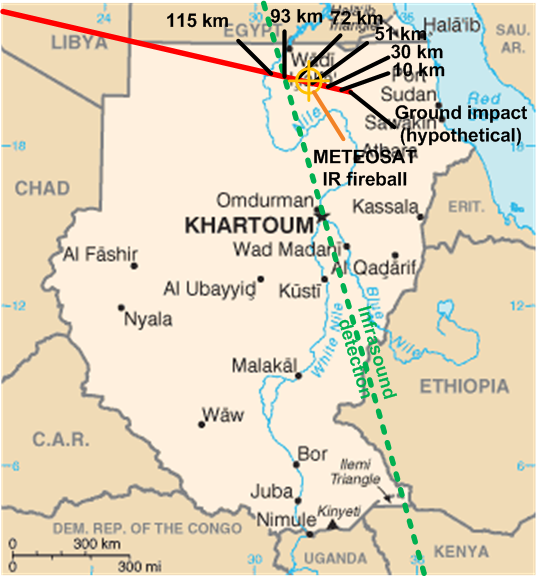
- Estimated path and altitude of the meteor in red, with the possible location for the METEOSAT IR fireball (bolide) as orange crosshairs and the infrasound detection of the explosion in green.

Discovery
- Discovered by: Catalina Sky Survey
- Discovery date: October 6, 2008, 06:39 UTC

Designations
- Alternative designations: 8TA9D69 (Catalina Sky Survey)
- Minor planet category: NEO; Apollo

Orbital characteristics
- Epoch October 7, 2008 (JD 2454746.5)
- Uncertainty parameter 4
- Observation arc: 1 day (575 observations)
- Aphelion: 1.71644 AU (256.776 Gm)
- Perihelion: 0.899957 AU (134.6317 Gm)
- Semi-major axis: 1.308201 AU (195.7041 Gm)
- Eccentricity: 0.312065
- Orbital period (sidereal): 1.50 yr (546.53 d)
- Mean anomaly: 330.7541°
- Mean motion: 0.6587071°/day
- Inclination: 2.54220°
- Longitude of ascending node: 194.101138°
- Time of perihelion: 2008-Nov-20
- Argument of perihelion: 234.44897°
- Jupiter MOID: 3.57975 AU (535.523 Gm)

Physical characteristics
- Dimensions: 4.1 metres (13.5 ft)
- Mass: 80,000 kilograms (180,000 lb)
- Mean density: ~1.5 g/cm^{3}
- Synodic rotation period: 0.0269409 h (1.61645 min)
- Geometric albedo: 0.1±0.03
- Spectral type: F/M
- Absolute magnitude (H): 30.4

2008 TC_{3} was an 80-tonne (80-long-ton; 90-short-ton), 4.1-meter (13 ft) diameter asteroid that entered Earth's atmosphere on October 7, 2008. It exploded at an estimated 37 kilometers (23 mi) above the Nubian Desert in Sudan. Some 600 meteorites, weighing a total of 10.5 kilograms (23.1 lb), were recovered; many of these belonged to a rare type known as ureilites, which contain, among other minerals, nanodiamonds.

It was the first time that an asteroid impact had been predicted before its entry into the atmosphere as a meteor.

== Discovery ==
An animation of 2008 TC3's excited rotation prior to entering the atmosphere

The asteroid was discovered by Richard A. Kowalski at the Catalina Sky Survey (CSS) 1.5-meter telescope at Mount Lemmon, north of Tucson, Arizona, US, on October 6, 06:39:51 UTC, 20 hours before the impact.

It was notable as the first such body to be observed and tracked prior to reaching Earth. The process of detecting and tracking a near-Earth object, an effort sometimes referred to as Spaceguard, was put to the test. In total, 586 astrometric and almost as many photometric observations were performed by 27 amateur and professional observers in less than 19 hours and reported to the Minor Planet Center, which in eleven hours issued 25 Minor Planet Electronic Circulars with new orbit solutions as observations poured in. On October 7, 01:49 UTC, the asteroid entered the shadow of the Earth, which made further observations impossible.

The photometric observations provided information on the shape and spin of the asteroid. Spectral observations that were performed by astronomers at the 4.2 metres (170 in) William Herschel Telescope at La Palma, Canary Islands are consistent with an F-type, C-type or M-type asteroid.

Impact predictions were performed by University of Pisa's CLOMON 2 semi-automatic monitoring system as well as Jet Propulsion Laboratory's Sentry system. The trajectory showed intersection with Earth's surface at roughly 20.3°N 33.5°E though the object was expected to break up perhaps 100–200 kilometers (60–120 mi) west as it descended, somewhat east of the Nile River, and about 100 kilometers (60 mi) south of the Egypt–Sudan border.

== Entry ==
Meteosat 8/EUMETSAT infrared image of the explosion

Animation of 2008 TC3's orbit 2008 TC3 · Sun · Earth

The meteor entered Earth's atmosphere above northern Sudan at 02:46 UTC (05:46 local time) on October 7, 2008, with a velocity of 12.8 kilometers per second (8.0 mi/s) at an azimuth of 281 degrees and an altitude angle of 19 degrees to the local horizon. It exploded ~37 kilometers above the ground with the energy of 0.9 to 2.1 kilotons of TNT over a remote area of the Nubian Desert, causing a large fireball or bolide.

The Times reported that the meteor's "light was so intense that it lit up the sky like a full moon", and pilots of an airliner 1,400 km (870 mi) away over the Republic of Chad, who had been warned about the imminent impact, reported seeing three bright flashes in short succession. A webcam captured the flash lighting up El-Gouna beach 725 kilometres (450 mi) north of the explosion (see this webcam frame). A low-resolution image of the explosion was captured by the weather satellite Meteosat 8. The Meteosat images place the fireball at 21.00°N 32.15°E.

According to U.S. government sources U.S. satellites detected the impact at 02:45:40 UT, with the initial detection at 20.9°N 31.4°E at 65.4 kilometers (40.6 mi; 35.3 nmi) altitude and final explosion at 20.8°N 32.2°E at 37 kilometers (23 mi; 20 nmi) altitude. These images have not been publicly released. The calculated total impact energy was 1 kilotons of TNT.

Infrasound detector arrays in Kenya also detected a sound wave from the direction of the expected impact corresponding to energy of 1.1 to 2.1 kilotons of TNT. Asteroids of this size hit Earth about two or three times a year.

== Recovered fragments ==
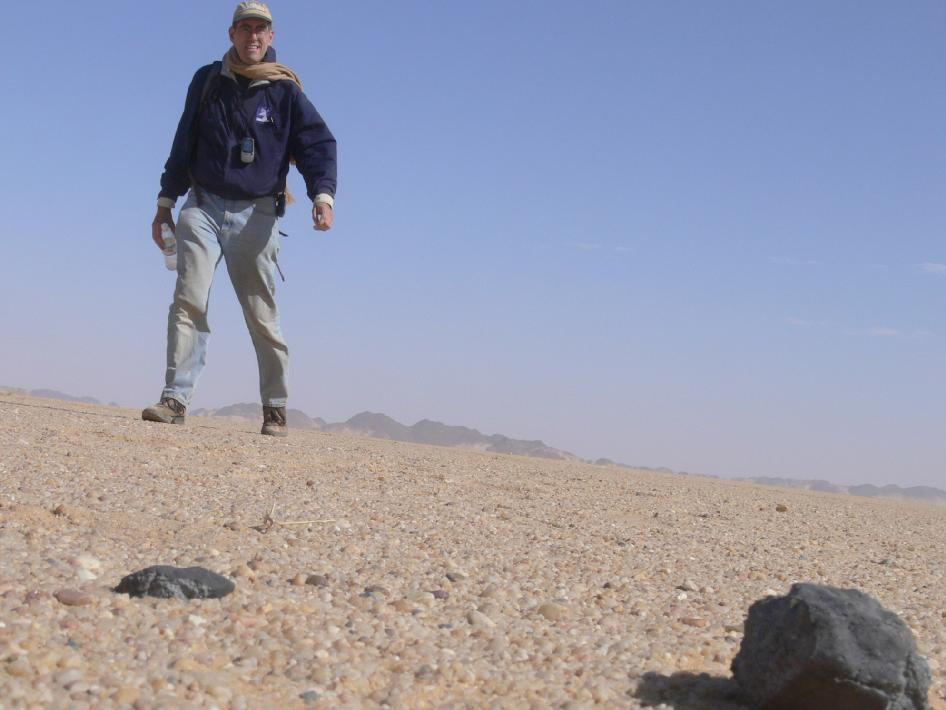
Jenniskens in the Nubian Desert, February 2009

A search of the impact zone that began on December 6, 2008, turned up 15 meteorites in three days. These meteorites are collectively named Almahata Sitta (Arabic: المحطة ستة), which means "Station Six" on the railroad between Wadi Halfa and Khartoum, Sudan. This search was led by Peter Jenniskens from the SETI Institute, California and Muawia Shaddad of the University of Khartoum in Sudan and carried out with the collaboration of 45 students and staff of the University of Khartoum. Numerous witnesses were interviewed, and the hunt was guided with a search grid and specific target area produced by NASA's Jet Propulsion Laboratory in Pasadena, California. Follow up searches in 2008 and 2009 involved over a hundred students and collected 10.5 kilograms (23 lb) of rock in some 600 fragments.

From the initial finds, one sample of the Almahata Sitta meteorite was sent for analysis to a consortium of researchers led by Jenniskens, the Almahata Sitta consortium, including NASA Ames in California, the Johnson Space Center in Houston, the Carnegie Institution of Washington, and Fordham University in New York City. This first sample measured was an anomalous ultra-fine-grained porous polymict ureilite achondrite, with large carbonaceous grains. Almahata Sitta is the first observed polymict ureilite fall. Much new information was obtained on the nature of the ureilite parent body. The astronomical observations, combined with spectral reflectance measurements of the meteorite, identified 2008 TC_{3} as an F-type asteroid. For the first time, asteroid class and meteorite type were linked.

Already during the first recovery, it was noticed that meteorites of several different appearances were present in the strewnfield. Later work revealed over 20 different meteorite types, most of which were various types of ureilites, but others were enstatite chondrites, ordinary chondrites, carbonaceous chondrites, and some rare and unique meteorite types. Studies in the Almahata Sitta Consortium showed that all types fell from 2008 TC3, the first time a single meteorite fall proved a mixed bag of meteorite types. The discovery of some fragile carbonaceous chondrites and the prominent deposition of dust in the atmosphere during entry suggested the possibility that what was found on the ground may not reflect what came in, from which alternative identities were proposed (e.g., ).

In other work, the nanodiamonds found in the meteorite were shown to have grown slowly, suggesting that the source was an earlier planet-sized object in the Solar System. Those claims have since been challenged.

More recently, in December 2020, further studies on the fragments have been reported. These studies revealed an extremely rare form of hydrated crystals, in a fragment called AhS 202, known as amphibole, suggesting to the researchers that 2008 TC_{3} early on likely belonged to a very large Ceres-class dwarf planet, with a diameter of about ~640–1,800 km (400–1,120 mi).

Richard Kowalski, who discovered the object, received a tiny fragment of Almahatta Sitta, a gift from friends and well-wishers on the Minor Planet Mailing List, which Kowalski founded in order to help connect professional and amateur astronomers.

== Gallery ==
Meteosat 8/EUMETSAT visual image of first light flare from 2008 TC_{3} with lat/long reference

Meteosat 8/EUMETSAT IR image of main fireball from 2008 TC_{3}

Meteosat images combined, showing offset from first light flare to main IR flare

== See also ==
- Asteroid impact prediction
- 1972 Great Daylight Fireball
- 2014 AA
- 2018 LA
- 2019 MO
- 2022 EB5
- 2022 WJ1
- 2023 CX1
- Impact event
- List of notable asteroids
- WT1190F
