= Novato meteorite =

2012 meteorite fall in California

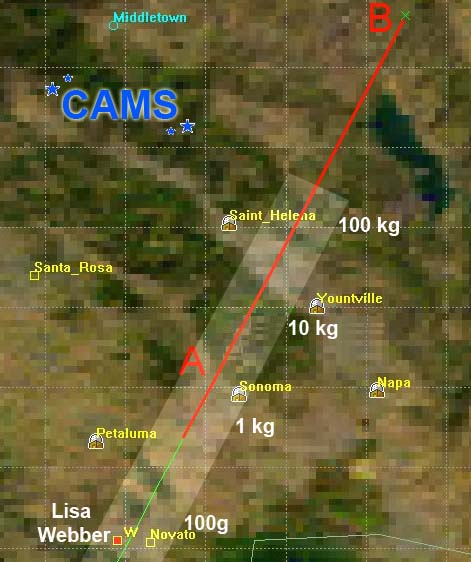
- Peter Jenniskens meteor trajectory. Six fragments have been found in Novato, California. More massive 1 kilogram (2.2 lb) fragments may have fallen near Sonoma with any 10 kilograms (22 lb) fragments possibly falling near Yountville / St. Helena. This trajectory estimate may be inaccurate.
- Type: Chondrite
- Class: Ordinary chondrite
- Group: L6
- Shock stage: S4
- Weathering grade: W0/1
- Country: USA
- Region: California
- Coordinates: 38.1°N 122.6°W
- Observed fall: Yes
- Fall date: 17 October 2012
- Found date: 20 October 2012
- TKW: ~363 grams (6 recovered)
- Strewn field: Yes
- Alternative names: Mill Valley
- Related media on Wikimedia Commons

The Novato meteorite is an ordinary chondrite which entered the Earth's atmosphere and broke up over Northern California at 19:44 Pacific Time on 17 October 2012. The falling bolide created a bright fireball and sonic booms and fragmented into smaller pieces as the intense friction of passing through the atmosphere heated it and absorbed its kinetic energy. The meteoroid was about 35 centimeters (14 in) across.

== Meteorite ==
The first fragment of the meteorite (N01) was recovered by Lisa Webber on 20 October after reading a story in the San Francisco Chronicle that described the NASA/CAMS meteor trajectory predicting a fall area in the North Bay. Lisa recalled hearing a sound on her roof the night of the meteor and went outside and located a 62 gram stone. Analysis of fragment N01 by Dr. Alan Rubin came back as a L6 breccia.

The second fragment was found by Brien Cook on 22 October (66 grams) and the third fragment was found by Jason Utas on 27 October (79 grams). The largest fragment recovered as of 5 November 2012 is N04 at 96 grams found by Robert Verish on 27 October. A fifth stone (N05) weighing 24 grams was found by Jason Utas on November 2. A sixth stone (N06) weighing 23.7 grams was found by the Kane family on November 11. More massive 1 kilogram (2.2 lb) fragments may have fallen near Sonoma with any 10 kilograms (22 lb) fragments possibly falling near Yountville.

This was the second significant meteorite in California in 2012, the first being the Sutter's Mill meteorite.

== See also ==
- Glossary of meteoritics
