= 2022 EB5 =

2022 asteroid-type meteoroid

2022 EB_{5}
Discovery
- Discovered by: Krisztián Sárneczky
- Discovery site: Piszkéstető Stn.
- Discovery date: 11 March 2022

Designations
- Alternative designations: Sar2593
- Minor planet category: NEO (Note: 2022 EB_{5} is not considered a potentially hazardous object (PHO) due to its small size. A PHO is defined by having an Earth minimum orbit intersection distance (MOID) of 0.05 AU or less, and having an absolute magnitude of 22 or brighter.) · Apollo

Orbital characteristics
- Epoch 11 March 2022 (JD 2459649.5)
- Uncertainty parameter 6
- Observation arc: 1.9 hours
- Aphelion: 4.772 AU
- Perihelion: 0.888 AU
- Semi-major axis: 2.830 AU
- Eccentricity: 0.6863
- Orbital period (sidereal): 4.76 yr (1,738 days)
- Mean anomaly: 353.614°
- Mean motion: 0° 12^{m} 25.472^{s} / day
- Inclination: 10.422°
- Longitude of ascending node: 350.992°
- Time of perihelion: July 2017 (last perihelion)
- Argument of perihelion: 222.416°
- Earth MOID: 3717 km
- Jupiter MOID: 0.661 AU

Physical characteristics
- Mean diameter: 2 m
- Absolute magnitude (H): 31.33±0.35

2022 EB_{5} was a small, two-metre Apollo near-Earth asteroid that disintegrated in Earth's atmosphere at 21:22 UTC on 11 March 2022, over the Arctic Ocean southwest of the Norwegian island Jan Mayen. With an atmospheric entry speed of 18 km/s (11 mi/s), the asteroid's impact generated a 4-kiloton-equivalent fireball that was detected by infrasound from Greenland and Norway. A bright flash possibly associated with the event was reported by observers from Northern Iceland.

It was discovered by astronomer Krisztián Sárneczky at Konkoly Observatory's Piszkéstető Station in Mátra Mountains, Hungary about two hours before impact. 2022 EB_{5} is the fifth asteroid discovered before impacting Earth. It was briefly listed on the Minor Planet Center's Near-Earth Object Confirmation Page under the temporary designation Sar2593.

Animation of 2022 EB5 around Sun Sun · Earth · 2022 EB5

== See also ==
- Asteroid impact prediction
- Impact event
- 2008 TC3
- 2014 AA
- 2018 LA
- 2019 MO
- 2022 WJ1
- WT1190F
