= FRIPON =

French meteor detection network

- Fireball Recovery and InterPlanetary Observation Network
- Réseau de Récupération de Boules de feu (bolides) et d'Observation Interplanétaire
- Abbreviation: FRIPON
- Formation: May 31st, 2016
- Purpose: Detecting meteorites
- Location: France
- PI: François Colas
- Website: https://www.fripon.org

The Fireball Recovery and InterPlanetary Observation Network (FRIPON; French: Réseau de Récupération de Boules de feu (bolides) et d'Observation Interplanétaire) is a fully automated observation network of cameras and radio receivers based in France that monitors the sky for fireball meteors. Using FRIPON, scientists can detect incoming meteors, determine their trajectory and estimate their strewn fields so that recovery operations of any surviving debris can be made. Currently, the FRIPON network operates across Western Europe and small sections of Canada, consisting of 150 cameras and 25 radio receivers that in total cover an area of nearly 1,500,000 square kilometres (580,000 mi^{2}). Formed in 2016, it is a collaboration between the Paris Observatory, the French National Centre for Scientific Research, the National Museum of Natural History, and Paris-Sud University, and has detected nearly 4000 meteoroids since 2020. FRIPON is the first fully automated high-density meteor observation system and is capable of quickly estimating a meteorite's strewn field to a 1 by 10km area.

== History ==
FRIPON was originally designed by a team of six French scientists from the Paris Observatory, the French National Museum of Natural History, Paris-Sud University and Aix-Marseille University. FRIPON benefited from a grant given by the French National Research Agency in 2013, which was used in the construction and development of the network.

== Objective ==
FRIPON's ultimate goal is to find and research meteorites. In its early years, the goal of FRIPON was to increase the number of meteorites found in France and determine what part of the Solar System they came from, as most of the meteorites that fall towards France are destroyed before or during impact. FRIPON does research on meteorites to uncover knowledge on the history of Earth, as meteorites found by the network have essentially the same composition as rocks from early Earth.

== Design ==
FRIPON has a total of around 150 observation cameras, almost all of them located in France. Cameras are also positioned in Spain, Belgium, Italy, the United Kingdom, Romania and Canada. These cameras are densely and evenly spaced, sitting roughly 70 to 80 kilometers apart from each other. FRIPON cameras are almost always at laboratories, science museums and other scientific installations. The cameras are equipped with fisheye lenses, allowing for a 360-degree view of the sky above, and are connected to a computer program that analyzes the images, looking for luminous events such as meteorite falls. FRIPON is the first fully automated observation network in the world, as when one camera spots a meteorite, it sends a signal to a central computer in Paris-Sud University, Paris, and when two or more cameras spot a meteorite, it will automatically calculate a predicted strewn field approximately 1 by 10 kilometers large and send a signal to FRIPON scientists with the data. Once the existence of a meteorite is ascertained, researchers will search the predicted area to find it.

=== Radio receivers ===
To assist in the detection of meteorites, FRIPON utilizes the GRAVES radar of the French Air Force. Stationed near Dijon, GRAVES transmits a radio signal that enters the ionosphere. When meteorites enter the ionosphere, ions created by the ionization of the meteorite's surface can scatter the radio waves produced by GRAVES. FRIPON's own radio receivers, of which there are 25, can detect the scattered radio waves and calculate where the meteorite is located, further assisting recovery operations. These radio receivers are spaced roughly 200 kilometers apart from each other, mainly located in France, with a few being located in Belgium, the United Kingdom, Italy, Switzerland, Spain and Austria.
