= Nubian Desert =

Desert east of the Nile in Sudan and Eritrea

Coordinates: 20.5°N 33°E

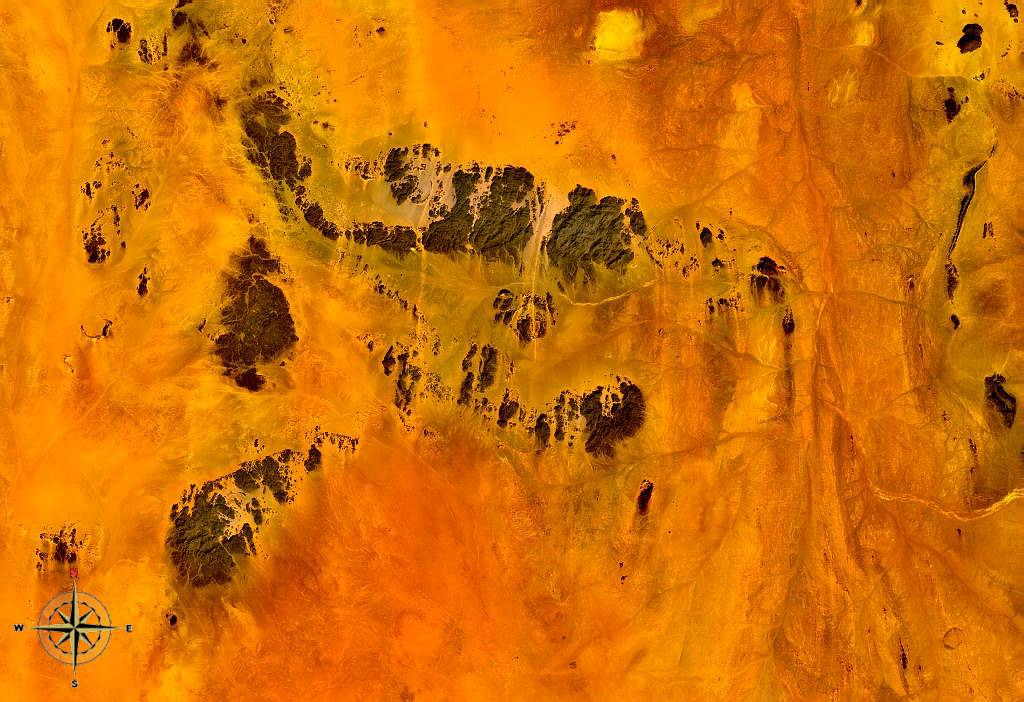
Fragment of Nubian Desert seen from space

The Nubian Desert (Arabic: صحراء النوبة Şaḩrā’ an Nūbah) is in the eastern region of the Sahara Desert, spanning approximately 400,000 km^{2} (150,000 sq mi) of northeastern Sudan and northern Eritrea, between the Nile and the Red Sea. The arid region is rugged and rocky and contains some dunes, and many wadis that die out before reaching the Nile. The average annual rainfall in the Nubian Desert is less than 5 inches (130 mm).

The native inhabitants of the area are the Nubians. The River Nile goes through most of its cataracts while traveling through the Nubian Desert, before the Great Bend of the Nile. The Nubian Desert affected the civilization of ancient Egypt in many ways. Merchants and traders from ancient Egypt would travel over the Nubian Desert to buy gold, cloth, stone, food, and much more from the ancient civilization of Nubia.

The Cairo–Cape Town Highway passes through the Nubian Desert. The largest city of the Nubian Desert is Port Sudan, at the eastern end of the desert on the Red Sea. Other important cities of the Nubian Desert are Atbara on the river of the same name and Massawa on the Red Sea. The town of Abidiya is on the Nile River.

This desert is the only habitat for the critically endangered palm Medemia argun, which only appears rarely in some oases in the desert.

On 7 October 2008 the meteoroid 2008 TC3 exploded above the Nubian Desert. The sky became so bright, people hundreds of miles away reported seeing the flash.
