= 2018 LA =

Small asteroid that impacted Earth

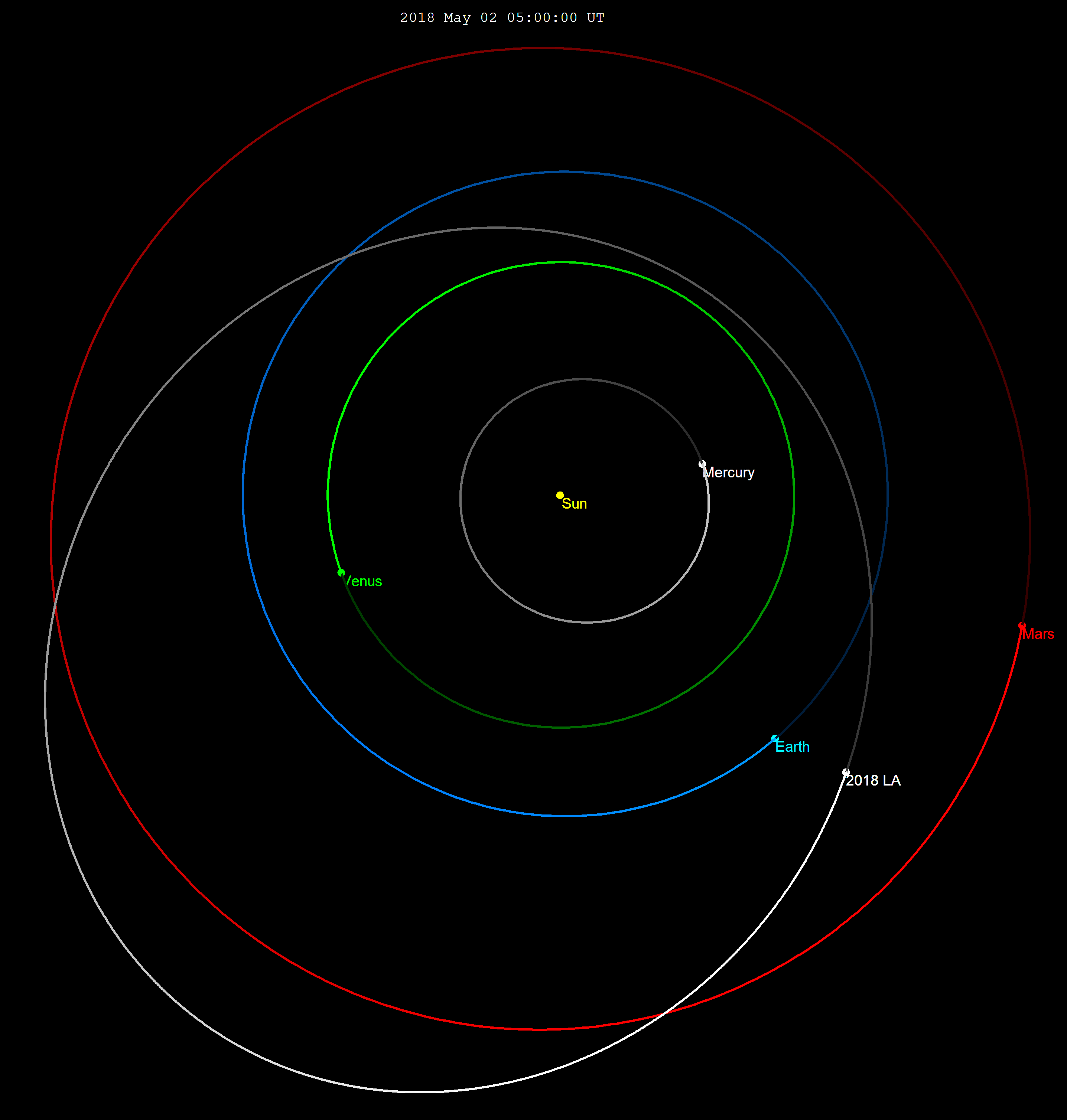
- Orbit and positions of 2018 LA, 30 days before collision

Discovery
- Discovered by: Mount Lemmon Srvy. Richard Kowalski
- Discovery site: Mount Lemmon Obs.
- Discovery date: 2 June 2018

Designations
- Alternative designations: ZLAF9B2 (NEOCP)
- Minor planet category: NEO · Apollo

Orbital characteristics
- Epoch 2 June 2018 (JD 2458271.5)
- Uncertainty parameter 8 · 6
- Observation arc: 3.8 hours (14 obs.)
- Aphelion: 1.9709 AU
- Perihelion: 0.7820 AU
- Semi-major axis: 1.3764 AU
- Eccentricity: 0.4319
- Orbital period (sidereal): 1.61 yr (590 d)
- Mean anomaly: 326.73°
- Mean motion: 0° 36^{m} 37.08^{s} / day
- Inclination: 4.2975°
- Longitude of ascending node: 71.870°
- Time of perihelion: 2018-Jul-26
- Argument of perihelion: 256.05°
- Earth MOID: < 5000 km
- Venus MOID: 0.0557 AU
- Mars MOID: 0.0191 AU

Physical characteristics
- Mean diameter: 1.6–5.2 m (5.2–17.1 ft) (est. 0.05–0.3); 2.6–3.8 m (8.5–12.5 ft) (est. impact energy)
- Mass: 25–35 t (55,000–77,000 lbs.)
- Geometric albedo: 0.15–0.30 (est. impact size)
- Apparent magnitude: 18.3 (at discovery)
- Absolute magnitude (H): 30.554; 30.6

2018 LA was a small Apollo near-Earth asteroid 2.6–3.8 m (9–12 ft) in mean diameter that impacted the atmosphere with small fragments reaching the Earth at roughly 16:44 UTC (18:44 local time) on 2 June 2018 near the border of Botswana and South Africa. It had been discovered only 8 hours earlier by the Mount Lemmon Survey, Arizona and based on 1 1/2 hours of observations, was calculated to have a roughly 85% chance of impact likely somewhere between Australia and Madagascar.

Hours later, a report arrived to the American Meteor Society that an observer from Botswana had seen a bright fireball. Shortly after the impact, the Asteroid Terrestrial-impact Last Alert System (ATLAS) released observations obtained from Hawaii roughly 2 hours after the Mount Lemmon observations which confirmed that the asteroid had indeed impacted Earth on a grazing path as per the observed fireball. A preliminary analysis of the pre-impact evolution of this meteoroid suggests that it may be part of a dynamical grouping.

== Discovery ==
On 2 June 2018, at roughly 08:22 UTC (01:22 local time), the Mount Lemmon Survey picked up an 18th-magnitude asteroid moving quickly against the background stars. The object was observed over the course of 15 minutes and submitted to the Minor Planet Center, and was followed up by the same survey for the next hour or so, resulting in an Observation arc of 1 hour and 17 minutes. The asteroid was soon identified as having a chance of impacting Earth (identified by JPL's scout program as 30% odds, calculated by Bill Gray as 82%) and one precovery observation was found just 7 minutes before its discovery observation, resulting in a final observation arc of 85 minutes before the asteroid was widely considered lost.

== Entry and ATLAS observations ==
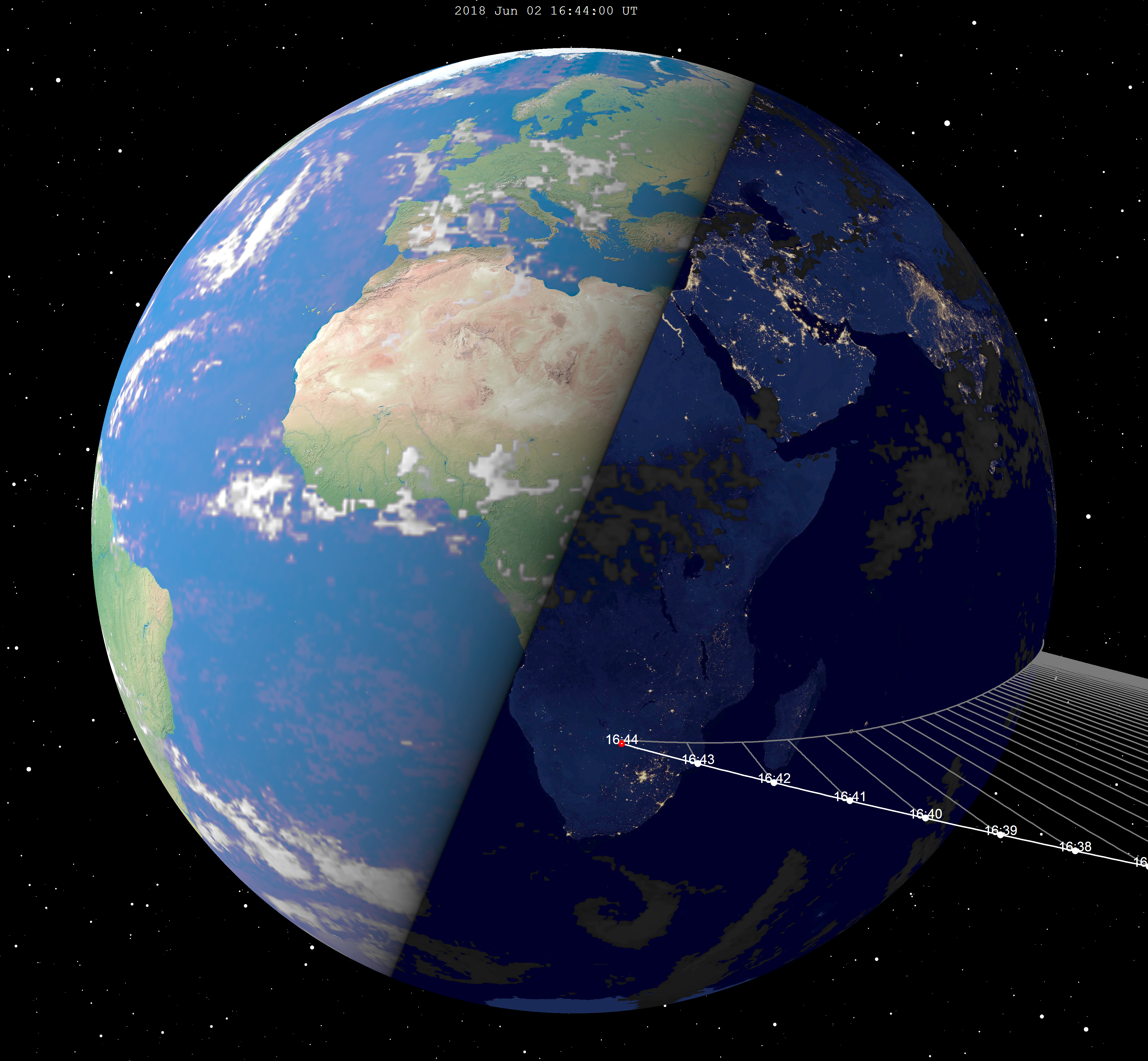
JPL estimated final trajectory and timing

Animation of 2018 LA's orbit from 2 June 2016 to 2 June 2018 2018 LA · Venus · Earth · Mars

Several hours later, at 16:44 UTC, a report arrived from southern Botswana to the American Meteor Society that an exceptionally bright fireball had been spotted. Although this was further west than projected based on the initial observations, the timing and location were consistent, although substantiated by just one observer.

Confirmation that the asteroid had impacted Earth, rather than simply a near approach, came when two observations by the Asteroid Terrestrial-impact Last Alert System (ATLAS) arrived later the same day and extended the observation arc from 85 minutes to 3 hours and 47 minutes, significantly improving the orbital parameters. The 4 hour observation arc better constrained the line of variations and showed that the asteroid was virtually certain to impact Earth, and based only on the sky observations, projected to have impacted in Namibia instead. This proves consistent with the fireball report.

The bolide was also detected by infrasound at station I47 in South Africa and registered about 0.4 kt. The asteroid was several meters in diameter and impacted the atmosphere going about 17 km/s (38,000 mph). Based on its velocity and energy, the asteroid was likely 2.6-3.8 meters in diameter.

Asteroids in the range of several meters in diameter are very hard to detect as they are too small to reflect much sunlight. For example, on 24 May 2018, the asteroid was still 0.069 AU (10,300,000 km; 6,400,000 mi) from Earth and only had an apparent magnitude of 25.5, much dimmer than any major modern surveys can detect using rapid-fire 30 second snapshots meant to cover as much of the sky as possible.

== Fragment recovery ==
Scientists promptly looked for a meteorite strewn field, hoping to recover fragments of the asteroid before they had a chance to weather too much. Fragments can achieve dark flight after deceleration to terminal velocity. Dark flight starts when fragments decelerate to about 2–4 km/s. Larger fragments will fall further down the strewn field. Assuming a similar fraction of 2018 LA survived as of 2008 TC3, several kilograms in total were expected to have reached the ground and be recoverable, if estimates of 40% as massive as 2008 TC_{3} were correct.

Shortly after the impact, Peter Jenniskens teamed with Oliver Moses of the Okavango Research Institute of the university of Maun and narrowed the search area from triangulated video records in Maun and Rakops. They joined a search effort organized by Mohutsiwa Gabadirwe of the Botswana Geoscience Institute and Alexander Proyer of BIUST, which resulted in the first meteorite found on June 23, now called Motopi Pan after a nearby watering hole. Non-destructive research of the meteorite at the University of Helsinki showed this to be a Howardite-Eucrite-Diogenite (HED) type. 22 more meteorites were recovered in an expedition led by Gabadirwe, when Jenniskens returned in October 2018, and one more in 2020 in an expedition led by Fulvio Franchi of BIUST.

Samples of six of the meteorites were distributed in an international 2018 LA Meteorite Consortium and results were published in 2021, confirming that asteroid 2018 LA was a Howardite-Eucrite-Diogenite (HED) type material, specifically a howardite with individual samples of diogenites, cumulate and basaltic eucrites, and howardites. 2018 LA was ejected from asteroid Vesta some 23±3 million years ago. The work traced the fragments of 2018 LA to an impact crater called Rubria.

== See also ==
- Chelyabinsk meteor
- Impact event
- List of asteroid close approaches to Earth in 2018
- 1930 Curuçá River event
- Sikhote-Alin meteorite
- Tunguska event
- Asteroid impact prediction
- 2008 TC3, the first asteroid ever discovered before impact
- 2014 AA, the second asteroid discovered before impact
- Vela incident
- WT1190F, space debris that re-entered in 2015
