= 2019 MO =

Near-Earth asteroid that impacted Earth

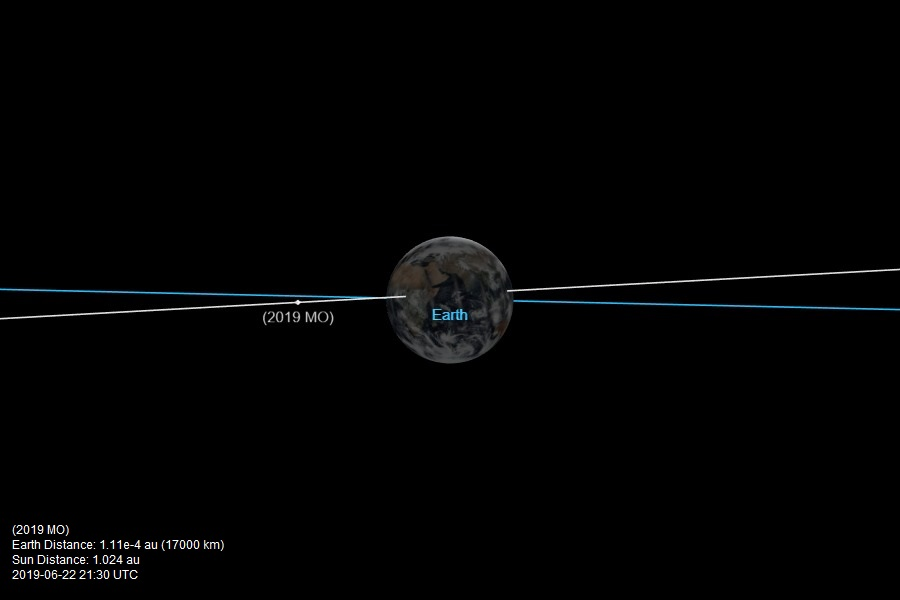
- Orbital diagram of 2019 MO on 22 June 2019

Discovery
- Discovered by: ATLAS–MLO (T08)
- Discovery site: Mauna Loa Obs.
- Discovery date: 22 June 2019

Designations
- Alternative designations: NEOCP A10eoM1
- Minor planet category: NEO · Apollo; Alinda

Orbital characteristics
- Epoch 22 June 2019 (JD 2458656.5)
- Uncertainty parameter 9 · 7
- Observation arc: 2.3 h (approx.)
- Aphelion: 4.0116 AU
- Perihelion: 0.9384 AU
- Semi-major axis: 2.4750 AU
- Eccentricity: 0.6208
- Orbital period (sidereal): 3.89 yr (1,422 d)
- Mean anomaly: 352.63°
- Mean motion: 0° 15^{m} 11.16^{s} / day
- Inclination: 1.5471°
- Longitude of ascending node: 91.040°
- Time of perihelion: 2019-Jul-21
- Argument of perihelion: 216.76°
- Earth MOID: 4.54412×10^{−7} AU (67.9791 km)

Physical characteristics
- Mean diameter: 3 m
- Absolute magnitude (H): 29.3

2019 MO, temporarily designated A10eoM1, was a small, harmless 3-meter near-Earth asteroid discovered by ATLAS–MLO that impacted Earth's atmosphere on 22 June 2019 at 21:25 UT. The impact of the bolide generated a 5-kiloton-equivalent explosion off the south coast of Puerto Rico which was detected by infrasound detectors. The strewn field would be spread over the Caribbean Sea.

The Apollo asteroid was inbound approaching a late July perihelion (closest approach to the Sun) when it impacted Earth at 16.1 km/s.

== Overview ==
The asteroid was discovered by ATLAS–MLO on 22 June 2019 and was observed four times with an observation arc of just 30 minutes, typical for ATLAS discoveries before they are followed up by other resources. With such a short observation arc, how far away (and, therefore, how large) the object is very uncertain until more data are available. Using these four observations, JPL's Scout listed the impact risk as modest, and calculated that the asteroid was about 160 meters (Note: With only 4 observations over a very short observation arc of 30 minutes, the first Scout solution estimated that the asteroid was bigger and further away. With an estimated absolute magnitude (H) of 21.6 and an assumed albedo of 0.15, the asteroid would have been around 160 meters in diameter.) in diameter and would pass about 36 LD (14 million km) from Earth. A fireball was however reported. When the Caribbean bolide report came in from the GOES-16 weather satellite it was possible to link the ATLAS astrometry to it. Three additional precovery observations by Pan-STARRS 2 were then located and extended the observation arc to 2.3 hours. Using all seven observations, Scout then obtained a significantly better orbit determination with an impact rating of "elevated". The updated orbit shows that the asteroid was about 1.3 LD (500,000 km) from Earth when ATLAS-MLO observed it, 12 hours before impact.

== Visibility ==
The asteroid came to opposition 175 degrees from the Sun on 17 May 2019 when it had an apparent magnitude of 27. Such a faint apparent magnitude would require a 10-hour image to detect with the largest 8-meter class telescopes in the world. Pan-STARRS is a 1.8-meter class telescope and with 30 second images has a limiting apparent magnitude of around 22. ATLAS has a limiting apparent magnitude closer to 19. (Note: Magnitude 27 is 40 times fainter than magnitude 23 and magnitude 23 is 40 times fainter than magnitude 19.) The asteroid first became brighter than apparent magnitude 23 on 19 June, when it was about 4 million km from Earth. The asteroid was detected by ATLAS when it was apparent magnitude 18.1.

== Meteorites ==
Animation of 2019 MO around the Sun Sun · Earth · 2019 MO

This bolide was a probable meteorite fall into waters 4.8 km deep. NEXRAD weather radar detected falling meteorites at 21:26:15 UT at 10.6 km above sea level. Signatures consistent with falling meteorites appear in a total of four radar sweeps. Meteorite falls with enough mass to generate green pixels on weather radar are very rare.

== Origin ==
It could be an Alinda asteroid originating from the 3:1 mean-motion resonance with Jupiter. Even though 2019 MO has a geometric similarity to the June epsilon Ophiuchids and four other minor meteor showers, it could just as easily be a sporadic meteor that just looks similar by chance. 2019 MO is about 12° away from the concentration of June epsilon Ophiuchids orbits.

== See also ==
- Asteroid impact prediction
- List of predicted asteroid impacts on Earth
