= Piszkéstető Station =

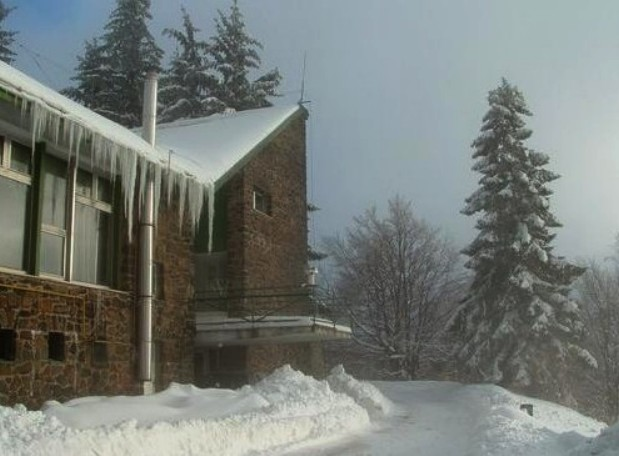
- Named after: Piszkés-tető
- Organization: Hungarian Academy of Sciences
- Observatory code: 461
- Location: Piszkéstető, Mátra Mountains, Hungary
- Coordinates: 47°55′05″N 019°53′39″E
- Altitude: 944 metres (3,097 ft)
- Established: 1958
- Website: www.konkoly.hu/staff/racz/piszkesteto-en.html

Telescopes
- Schmidt telescope: 60/90/180 cm
- Cassegrain telescope: 50 cm
- RCC Telescope: 100 cm
- RCC Telescope: 40 cm
- Related media on Commons

The Piszkéstető Station or Piszkéstető Mountain Station is an astronomical observatory in Mátraszentimre in Mátra Mountains, about 80 kilometers (50 mi) northeast of Hungary's capital Budapest. It is a station of Konkoly Observatory, first built in 1958. It has the observatory code 461 and 561 for being used by the Szeged University and Konkoly Observatory, respectively.

== Instruments ==
The observatory currently features four telescopes:

- 60/90/180-centimetre Schmidt telescope since 1962
- 80-centimetre Ritchey-Chrétien telescope since 2019 (which replaced the 50-centimetre Cassegrain telescope that has been in its place since 1966)
- 1-metre Ritchey–Chrétien telescope since 1974
- 40-centimetre Ritchey–Chrétien telescope since 2010

== Discovery of Impactors ==
Piszkéstető Station discovered 3 of the first 8 impactors which were observed and confirmed while still in orbit: 2022 EB5, 2023 CX1, and 2024 BX1.

The asteroid 2022EB was only the fifth asteroid in history to have been discovered prior to impact. This puts the station in a very short list of observatories that have achieved this feat. Several asteroids impact earth every year with enough force to be detected by infrasound sensors designed to detect detonation of nuclear devices, but the vast majority of impacts are unpredicted and occur without warning. Piszkéstető Station discovered this asteroid before it impacted.

2023 CX1 was discovered at the station on February 12, 2023 and impacted the Earth off the coast of Normandy, France.

2024 BX1 was discovered at the station a few hours before it entered the Earth's atmosphere near Berlin on January 21, 2024.

== Honors ==
The minor planet 37432 Piszkéstető was named after the station, where it was discovered by astronomers Krisztián Sárneczky and Zsuzsanna Heiner in January 2002.

== List of discovered minor planets ==
A total of 19 minor planet discoveries are credited directly to the Piszkéstető Station by the Minor Planet Center.

181136 Losonczrita	25 August 2005	list
(238623) 2005 CL_{12}	1 February 2005	list
(240364) 2003 SQ_{129}	20 September 2003	list
(290129) 2005 QC_{152}	31 August 2005	list
(334756) 2003 RP_{7}	4 September 2003	list
(345648) 2006 TZ_{6}	1 October 2006	list
(378920) 2008 UP_{95}	24 October 2008	list
(384459) 2010 BM_{4}	24 January 2010	list
(390743) 2003 SD_{129}	20 September 2003	list
(399565) 2003 SZ_{128}	20 September 2003	list

(405571) 2005 QE_{87}	31 August 2005	list
(413233) 2003 SB_{129}	20 September 2003	list
(423380) 2005 JD_{94}	12 May 2005	list
(423433) 2005 QL_{75}	29 August 2005	list
(446957) 2003 SD_{127}	19 September 2003	list
(461650) 2005 GP_{9}	3 April 2005	list
(464745) 2003 RQ_{7}	5 September 2003	list
(469773) 2005 QB_{76}	30 August 2005	list
(474440) 2003 NH_{5}	5 July 2003	list

== Gallery ==
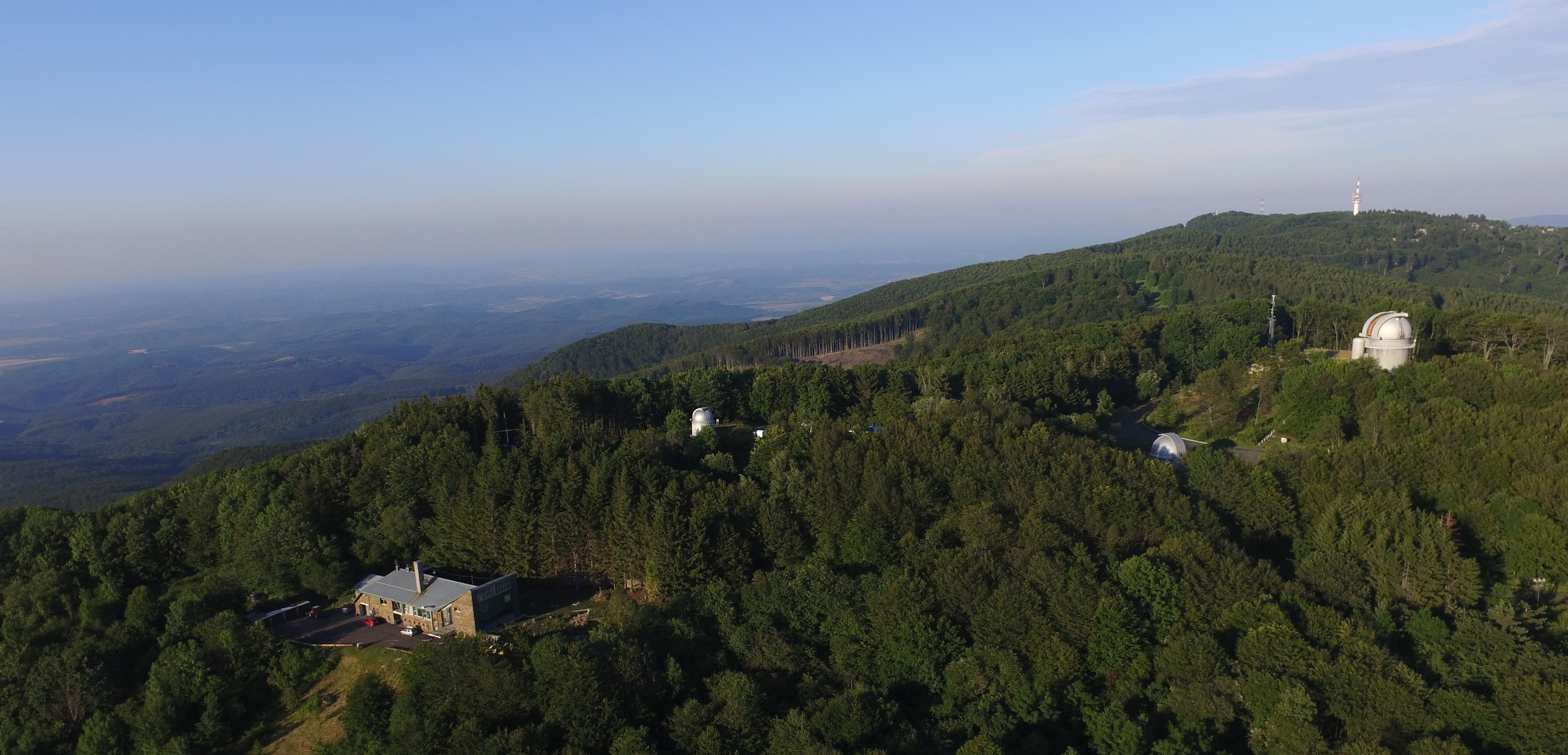
Aerial view of the Piszkéstető Station

== See also ==
- List of asteroid-discovering observatories
- List of astronomical observatories
- List of minor planet discoverers § Discovering dedicated institutions
- List of observatory codes
