= 2026 Koblenz meteor =

Meteor fireball that fell over western Europe

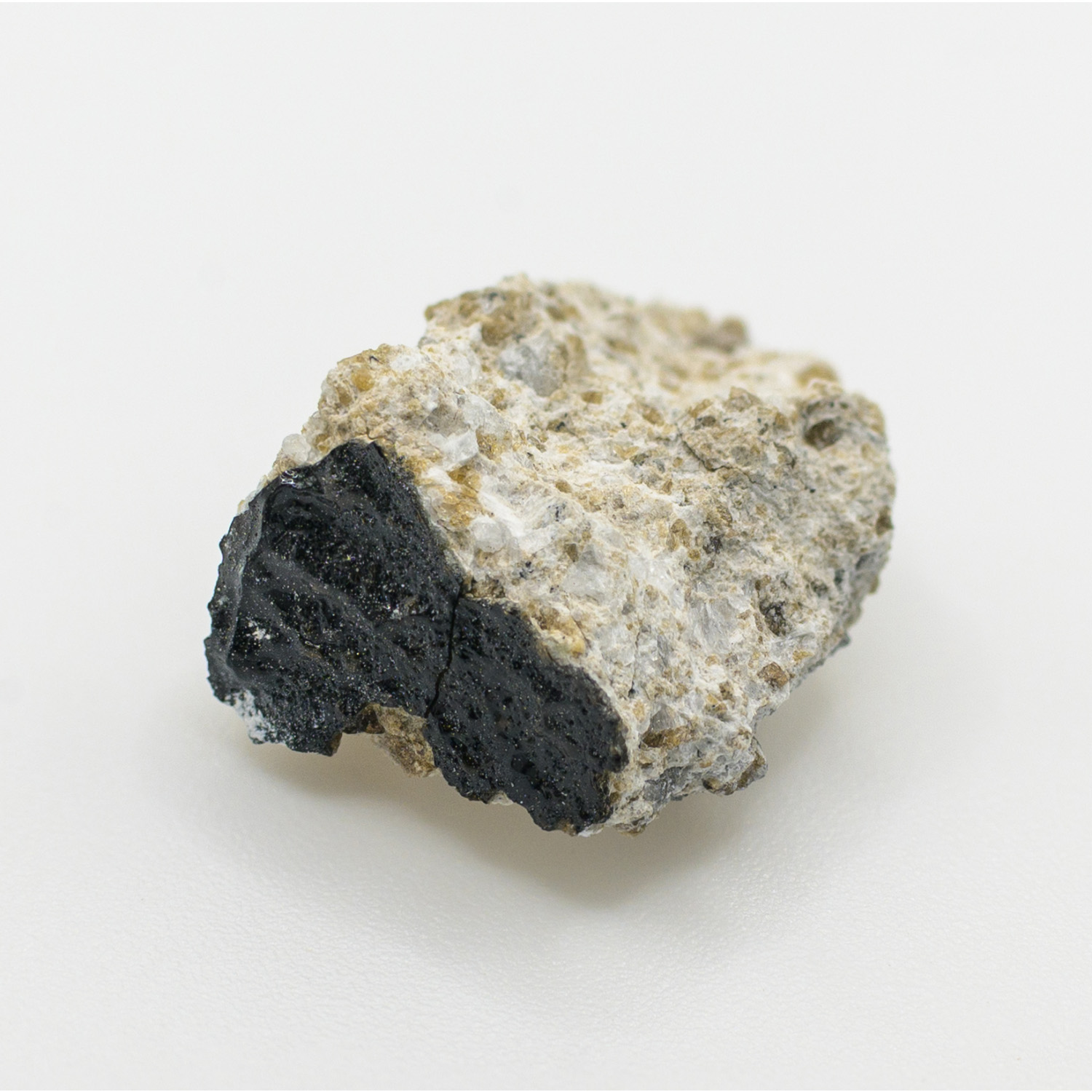
- Fragment of the meteorite, recovered from Koblenz-Güls
- Country: Germany
- Region: Rhineland-Palatinate
- Fall date: 8 March 2026

At 18:55 CET on 8 March 2026, a bright fireball was seen across Western Europe traveling from the southwest.

== History ==
The fireball, caused by a meteor estimated to be up to a few meters in diameter, disintegrated in an air burst at an altitude of about 50 kilometres (31 mi) and scattered meteorite fragments across western Germany. Some falling fragments damaged residential buildings in Koblenz and the Eifel and Hunsrück areas. One fragment smashed a football-sized hole through the roof of a residential building in the district of Güls in Koblenz, damaging a bedroom. Though people were in the building at that time, no injuries were reported. Several centimeter-sized fragments were quickly recovered from the damaged building. The recovered fragments were identified as probable chondrites, the most common type of stony meteorite, though definitive identification requires laboratory analysis.

As of 20 March 2026, 3,228 sightings of the fireball were reported to the International Meteor Organization. Emergency phone calls in Koblenz surged following the fireball's passage; local police quickly ruled out a rocket strike or plane crash.

== See also ==
- 2024 BX1 – small asteroid that disintegrated over Berlin in January 2024
