= Asteroid impact prediction =

Prediction of the dates and times of asteroids impacting Earth

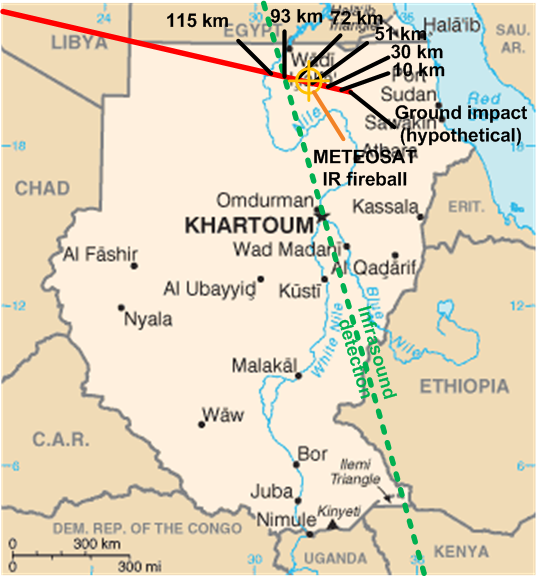
2008 TC3 was the first successfully predicted asteroid impact. This picture shows the estimated path and altitude of the meteor in red, with the possible location for the METEOSAT IR fireball (bolide) as orange crosshairs and the infrasound detection of the explosion in green

Asteroid impact prediction is the prediction of the dates and times of asteroids impacting Earth, along with the locations and severities of the impacts.

The process of impact prediction follows three major steps:

1. Discovery of an asteroid and initial assessment of its orbit which is generally based on a short observation arc of less than 2 weeks.
2. Follow-up observations to improve the orbit determination
3. Calculating if, when and where the orbit may intersect with Earth at some point in the future.

The usual purpose of predicting an impact is to direct an appropriate response.

Most asteroids are discovered by a camera on a telescope with a wide field of view. Image differencing software compares a recent image with earlier ones of the same part of the sky, detecting objects that have moved, brightened, or appeared. Those systems usually obtain a few observations per night, which can be linked up into a very preliminary orbit determination. This predicts approximate positions over the next few nights, and follow-ups can then be carried out by any telescope powerful enough to see the newly detected object. Orbit intersection calculations are then carried out by two independent systems, one (Sentry) run by NASA and the other (NEODyS) by ESA.

Current systems detect an arriving object only when several factors align, mainly its direction of approach relative to the Sun, the weather, and the Moon's phase. Smaller objects are less likely to be detected before impact. (Note: Smaller asteroids may be bright enough to observe only briefly. Larger asteroids remain visible longer, which can offset temporary obstacles such as bad weather or a bright Moon; however, proximity to the Sun can prevent asteroids of any size from being discovered. This is particularly true for Aten asteroids, which spend most of their time closer to the Sun than Earth and are therefore difficult to detect without a space-based system orbiting inside Earth's orbit.) A few near misses by medium-size asteroids have been predicted years in advance, with a tiny chance of striking Earth, and a handful of small impactors have successfully been detected hours in advance. All of the latter struck wilderness or ocean, injuring no one. The majority of impacts are by small, undiscovered objects. They rarely hit a populated area, but can cause widespread damage when they do. Detection of smaller objects is improving as existing systems are upgraded and new ones come online, but all current systems have a blind spot around the Sun that can be overcome only by a dedicated space-based system or by discovering objects during an earlier approach to Earth, years before a potential impact.

== History ==
In 1992 a report to NASA recommended a coordinated survey (christened Spaceguard) to discover, verify and provide follow-up observations for Earth-crossing asteroids. This survey was scaled to discover 90% of all objects larger than one kilometer within 25 years. Three years later, a further NASA report recommended search surveys that would discover 60–70% of the short-period, near-Earth objects larger than one kilometer within ten years and obtain 90% completeness within five more years.

In 1998, NASA formally embraced the goal of finding and cataloging, by 2008, 90% of all near-Earth objects (NEOs) with diameters of 1 km or larger that could represent a collision risk to Earth. The 1 km diameter metric was chosen after considerable study indicated that an impact of an object smaller than 1 km could cause significant local or regional damage but is unlikely to cause a worldwide catastrophe. The impact of an object much larger than 1 km diameter could well result in worldwide damage up to, and potentially including, extinction of the human race. The NASA commitment has resulted in the funding of a number of NEO search efforts, which made considerable progress toward the 90% goal by the target date of 2008 and also produced the first ever successful prediction of an asteroid impact (the 4-meter 2008 TC3 was detected 19 hours before impact). However, the 2009 discovery of several NEOs approximately 2 to 3 kilometers in diameter (e.g. 2009 CR_{2}, 2009 HC82, 2009 KJ, 2009 MS and 2009 OG) demonstrated there were still large objects to be detected.

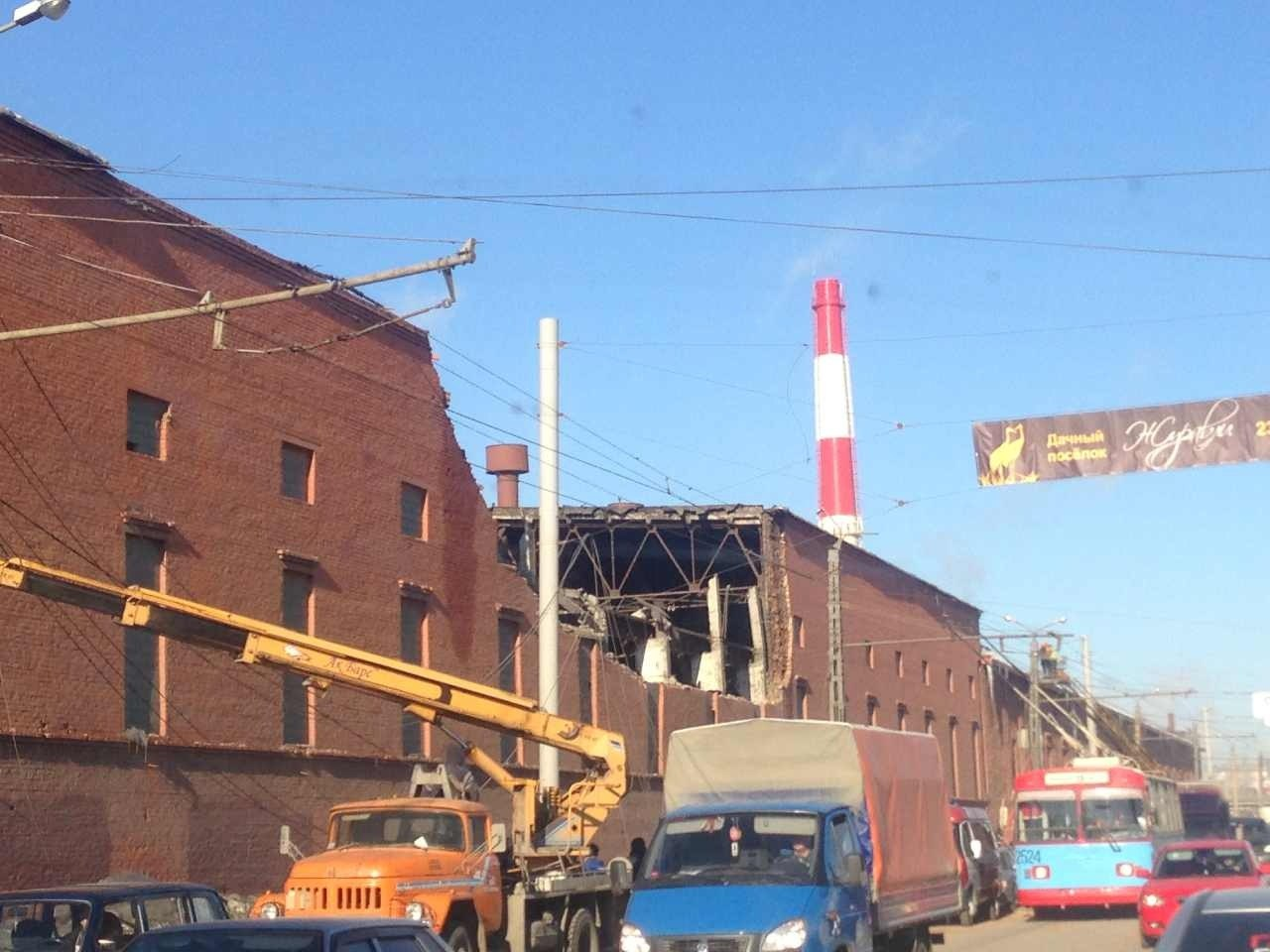
One of the 7,000 buildings damaged by the 2013 Chelyabinsk meteor

Three years later, in 2012, the 40 meter diameter asteroid 367943 Duende was discovered and successfully predicted to be on close but non-colliding approach to Earth again just 11 months later. This was a landmark prediction as the object was only 20 m × 40 m, and it was closely monitored as a result. On the day of its closest approach and by coincidence, a smaller asteroid was also approaching Earth, unpredicted and undetected, from a direction close to the Sun. Unlike Duende it was on a collision course and it impacted Earth 16 hours before Duende passed, becoming the Chelyabinsk meteor. It injured 1,500 people and damaged over 7,000 buildings, raising the profile of the dangers of even small asteroid impacts if they occur over populated areas. The asteroid is estimated to have been 18 m (60 ft) across.

In April 2018, the B612 Foundation stated "It's 100 per cent certain we'll be hit [by a devastating asteroid], but we're not 100 per cent sure when." Also in 2018, physicist Stephen Hawking, in his final book Brief Answers to the Big Questions, considered an asteroid collision to be the biggest threat to the planet. In June 2018, the US National Science and Technology Council warned that America is unprepared for an asteroid impact event, and has developed and released the National Near-Earth Object Preparedness Strategy Action Plan to better prepare.

== Discovery of near-Earth asteroids ==
The first step in predicting impacts is detecting asteroids and determining their orbits. Finding faint near-Earth objects against the much more numerous background stars is very much a needle in a haystack search. It is achieved by sky surveys that are designed to discover near-Earth asteroids. Unlike the majority of telescopes that have a narrow field of view and high magnification, survey telescopes have a wide field of view to scan the entire sky in a reasonable amount of time with enough sensitivity to pick up the faint near-Earth objects they are searching for.

NEO focused surveys revisit the same area of sky several times in succession. Movement can then be detected using image differencing techniques. Anything that moves from image to image against the background of stars is compared to a catalogue of all known objects, and if it is not already known is reported as a new discovery along with its precise position and the observation time. This then allows other observers to confirm and add to the data about the newly discovered object.

=== Cataloging vs warning surveys ===
Asteroid surveys can be broadly classified as either cataloging surveys, which use larger telescopes to mostly identify larger asteroids well before they come notably close to Earth, or warning surveys, which use smaller telescopes to mostly look for smaller asteroids within several million kilometers of Earth. Cataloging systems focus on finding larger asteroids years in advance and they scan the sky slowly (of the order of once per month), but deeply. Warning systems focus on scanning the sky relatively quickly (of the order of once per night). They typically cannot detect objects that are as faint as cataloging systems but they will not miss an asteroid that dramatically brightens for just a few days when it passes very close to Earth. Some systems compromise and scan the sky approximately once per week.

==== Cataloging systems ====
For larger asteroids (> 100 m to 1 km across), prediction is based on cataloging the asteroid, years to centuries before it could impact. This technique is possible as their size makes them bright enough to be seen from a long distance. Their orbits therefore can be measured and any future impacts predicted long before they are on an impact approach to Earth. This long period of warning is important as an impact from a 1 km object would cause worldwide damage and a minimum of around a decade of lead time would be needed to deflect it away from Earth. As of 2018, the inventory is nearly complete for the kilometer-size objects (around 900) which would cause global damage, and approximately one third complete for 140 meter objects (around 8500) which would cause major regional damage. (Note: Incompleteness refers to the fraction of undiscovered asteroids, not the amount of time remaining to achieve completeness. The asteroids remaining to be discovered are the ones which are hardest to find.) (Note: The exact percentage of objects discovered is uncertain but is estimated using statistical techniques. 2018 estimates for objects at least 1 km in size put the figure somewhere between 89% and 99%, with an expected value of 94%. This matches the figure from a 2017 NASA report which was estimated independently using a different technique) The effectiveness of the cataloging is somewhat limited by the fact that some proportion of the objects have been lost since their discovery, due to insufficient observations to accurately determine their orbits.

==== Warning systems ====
Smaller near-Earth objects number into millions and therefore impact Earth much more often, though obviously with much less damage. The vast majority remain undiscovered. They seldom pass close enough to Earth that they become bright enough to observe, and so most can only be observed when within a few million kilometers of Earth. They therefore cannot usually be catalogued well in advance and can only be warned about, a few weeks to days in advance.

Current mechanisms for detecting asteroids on approach rely on ground based visible-light telescopes with wide fields of view. Those currently can monitor the sky at most every night, and therefore miss most of the smaller asteroids which are bright enough to detect for less than a day. Such very small asteroids much more commonly impact Earth than larger ones, but cause little damage. Missing them therefore has limited consequences. Much more importantly, ground-based telescopes are blind to most of the asteroids which impact the day side of the planet and will miss even large ones. These and other problems mean very few impacts are successfully predicted.

Asteroids detected by warning systems are much too close to their time of potential impact to deflect them away from Earth, but there is still enough time to mitigate the consequences of the impact by evacuating and otherwise preparing the affected area. Warning systems can also detect asteroids which have been successfully catalogued as existing, but whose orbit was insufficiently well determined to allow a prediction of where they are now.

=== Surveys ===
The main NEO-focused surveys are listed below, along with future telescopes that are already funded.

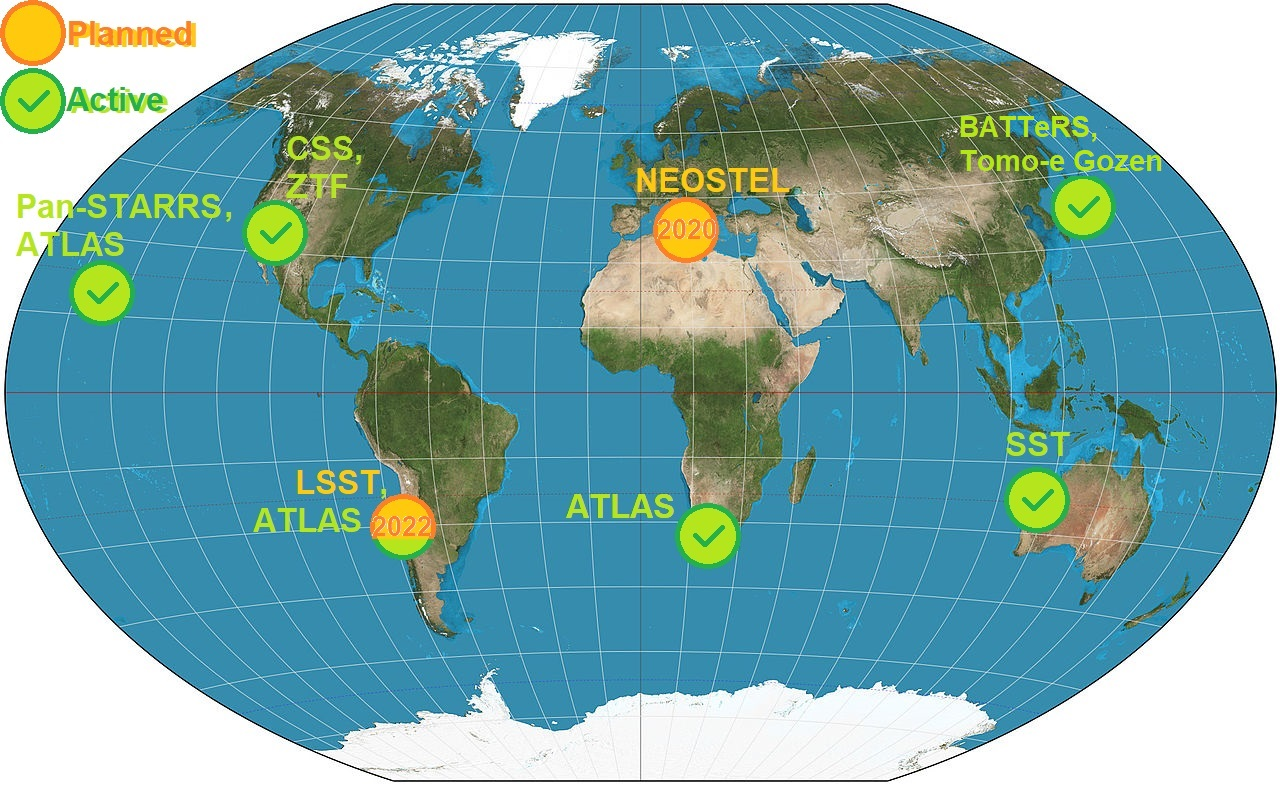
Locations of the major near-Earth asteroid surveys. The addition of Kiso, SST and the Southern ATLAS locations mean the surveys are no longer solely clustered in the north west of the globe

Originally all the surveys were clustered together in a relatively small part of the Northern Hemisphere. This meant that around 15% of the sky at extreme Southern declination was never monitored, and that the rest of the Southern sky was observed over a shorter season than the Northern sky. Moreover, as the hours of darkness are fewer in summertime, the lack of a balance of surveys between North and South meant that the sky was scanned less often in the Northern summer. The ATLAS telescopes now operating at the South African Astronomical Observatory and El Sauce observatory in Chile now cover this gap in the south east of the globe. Once it is completed, the Rubin Observatory will improve the existing cover of the southern sky. The 3.5 m Space Surveillance Telescope, which was originally also in the southwest United States, was dismantled and moved to Western Australia in 2017. When completed, this should also improve the global coverage. Construction has been delayed due to the new site being in a cyclone region, but was completed in September 2022.

Survey	Telescope diameter (m)	Number of telescopes	Time to scan entire visible sky (when clear) (Note: Because of daylight telescopes cannot see the portion of the sky around the Sun and because the Earth is in the way can only see so far North and South of the latitude that they are positioned at. The time given is the time it takes for a survey to complete coverage of the part of the sky that it can see from where it is located, assuming good weather.)	Limiting magnitude (Note: The limiting magnitude indicates how bright an object needs to be before the telescope can detect it, larger numbers are better (fainter objects can be detected).)	Hemisphere	Activity	Peak yearly observations (Note: This total includes all asteroid observations, not just near-Earth asteroids)	Survey category
ATLAS	0.5	2	2 nights	19	Northern	2016–present	1,908,828	Warning survey
ATLAS	0.5	2	1 night	19	Southern	2022–present	NA	Warning survey
Catalina Sky Survey	1.5	1	30 nights	21.5	Northern	1998–present	see Mount Lemmon Survey	Cataloging survey
Catalina Sky Survey	0.7	1	7 nights	19.5	Northern	1998–present	1,934,824	Cataloging survey
Catalina Sky Survey	0.5	1	?	?	Southern	2004–2013	264,634	Warning survey
Kiso Observatory	1.05	1	0.2 nights (2 hours)	18	Northern	2019–present	?	Warning survey
Rubin Observatory	8.4	1	3–4 nights	27	Southern	2026-present	NA	Both
Lincoln Near-Earth Asteroid Research	1.0	2	?	?	Northern	1998–2012	3,346,181	Cataloging survey
Lowell Observatory Near-Earth-Object Search	0.6	1	41 nights	19.5	Northern	1998–2008	836,844	Cataloging survey
Mount Lemmon Survey	1.52	1	?	~21	Northern	2005–present	2,920,211	Cataloging survey
Near-Earth Asteroid Tracking	?	2	?	?	Northern	1995–2007	1,214,008	Cataloging survey
NEOSM	0.5	1	?	?	SEL1	2027	NA	Cataloging survey
NEO Survey Telescope	1	1	1 night	21	Northern	2025–present	NA	Warning survey
NEOWISE	0.4	1	~6 months	~22	Earth Orbit	2009–2024	2,279,598	Cataloging survey
Pan-STARRS	1.8	2	30 nights	23	Northern	2010–present	5,254,605	Cataloging survey
Space Surveillance Telescope	3.5	1	6 nights	20.5	Northern	2014–2017	6,973,249	Warning survey
Space Surveillance Telescope	3.5	1	6 nights	20.5	Southern	2022–present	NA	Warning survey
Spacewatch	1.8	1	?	?	Northern	1980–1998 (Note: Spacewatch is still operational, however in 1998 Catalina Sky Survey (which is also run by the University of Arizona) took over survey duties. Since then Spacewatch has focused on follow-up observations.)	1,532,613	Cataloging survey
Spacewatch	0.9	1	?	22	Northern	1980–1998	1,532,613	Cataloging survey
Zwicky Transient Facility	1.2	1	3 nights	20.5	Northern	2018–present	483,822	Warning survey

==== wATLAS ====
ATLAS, the "Asteroid Terrestrial-impact Last Alert System" uses four 0.5-metre (20-inch) telescopes. Two are located on the Hawaiian Islands, at Haleakala and Mauna Loa, one at the South African Astronomical Observatory, and one in Chile. With a field of view of 30 square degrees each, the telescopes survey the observable sky down to apparent magnitude 19 with 4 exposures every night. The survey has been operational with the two Hawaii telescopes since 2017, and in 2018 obtained NASA funding for two additional telescopes sited in the Southern hemisphere. They were expected to take 18 months to build. Their southern locations provide coverage of the 15% of the sky that cannot be observed from Hawaii, and combined with the Northern hemisphere telescopes give non-stop coverage of the equatorial night sky (the South African location is not only in the opposite hemisphere to Hawaii, but also at an opposing longitude). The full ATLAS concept consists of eight of its 50-centimeter (20-inch) diameter f/2 Wright-Schmidt telescopes, spread over the globe for 24h/24h coverage of the full-night-sky.

==== Catalina Sky Survey (including Mount Lemmon Survey) ====
In 1998, the Catalina Sky Survey (CSS) took over from Spacewatch in surveying the sky for the University of Arizona. It uses two telescopes, a 1.5-metre (59-inch) Cassegrain reflector telescope on the peak of Mount Lemmon (also known as a survey in its own right, the Mount Lemmon Survey), and a 0.7-metre (28-inch) Schmidt telescope near Mount Bigelow (both in the Tucson, Arizona area in the south west of the United States). Both sites use identical cameras which provide a field of view of 5 square degrees on the 1.5-metre (59-inch) telescope and 19 square degrees on the Catalina Schmidt. The Cassegrain reflector telescope takes three to four weeks to survey the entire sky, detecting objects fainter than apparent magnitude 21.5. The 0.7-metre (28-inch) telescope takes a week to complete a survey of the sky, detecting objects fainter than apparent magnitude 19. This combination of telescopes, one slow and one medium, has so far detected more near-Earth objects than any other single survey. This shows the need for a combination of different types of telescopes.

CSS used to include a telescope in the Southern Hemisphere, the Siding Spring Survey. However operations ended in 2013 after funding was discontinued.

==== Kiso Observatory (Tomo-e Gozen) ====
The Kiso Observatory uses a 1.05m Schmidt telescope on Mt. Ontake near Tokyo in Japan. In late 2019 the Kiso Observatory added a new instrument to the telescope, "Tomo-e Gozen", designed to detect fast moving and rapidly changing objects. It has a wide field of view (20 square degrees) and scans the sky in just 2 hours, far faster than any other survey as of 2021. This puts it squarely in the warning survey category. In order to scan the sky so quickly, the camera captures 2 frames per second, which means the sensitivity is lower than other metre class telescopes (which have much longer exposure times), giving a limiting magnitude of just 18. However, despite not being able to see dimmer objects which are detectable by other surveys, the ability to scan the entire sky several times per night allows it to spot fast moving asteroids that other surveys miss. It has discovered a significant number of near-Earth asteroids as a result.

==== Rubin Observatory (Large Synoptic Survey Telescope) ====
The Rubin Observatory, originally named the Large Synoptic Survey Telescope (LSST), is a wide-field survey reflecting telescope with an 8.4 meter primary mirror, currently being commissioned on Cerro Pachón in Chile. It will survey the entire available sky around every three nights. Science operations began in late 2025. Scanning the sky relatively fast but also being able to detect objects down to apparent magnitude 27, the survey is intended to specialise in detecting nearby fast moving objects and excel in finding for larger slower objects located at a bigger distance.

==== Near-Earth Object Surveillance Mission ====
A planned space-based 0.5m infrared telescope designed to survey the Solar System for potentially hazardous asteroids. The telescope will use a passive cooling system, and so unlike its predecessor NEOWISE, it will not suffer from a performance degradation due to running out of coolant. It does still have a limited mission duration however as it needs to use propellant for orbital station keeping in order to maintain its position at SEL1. From here, the mission will search for asteroids hidden from Earth-based satellites by the Sun's glare. As of October 2025, it is planned for launch in September 2027.

==== NEO Survey Telescope ====
The Near Earth Object Survey TELescope (NEOSTEL) is an ESA funded project, starting with an initial prototype currently under construction. The telescope is of a new "Fly-Eye" design that combines a single reflector with multiple sets of optics and CCDs, giving a very wide field of view (around 45 square degrees). When complete it will have the widest field of view of any telescope and will be able to survey the majority of the visible sky in a single night. If the initial prototype is successful, three more telescopes are planned for installation around the globe. Because of the novel design, the size of the primary mirror is not directly comparable to more conventional telescopes, but is equivalent to a conventional 1–metre telescope.

As of June 2025, the telescope is undergoing final testing at the Italian Space Agency before its installation near the top of Mount Mufara, Sicily.

==== NEOWISE ====
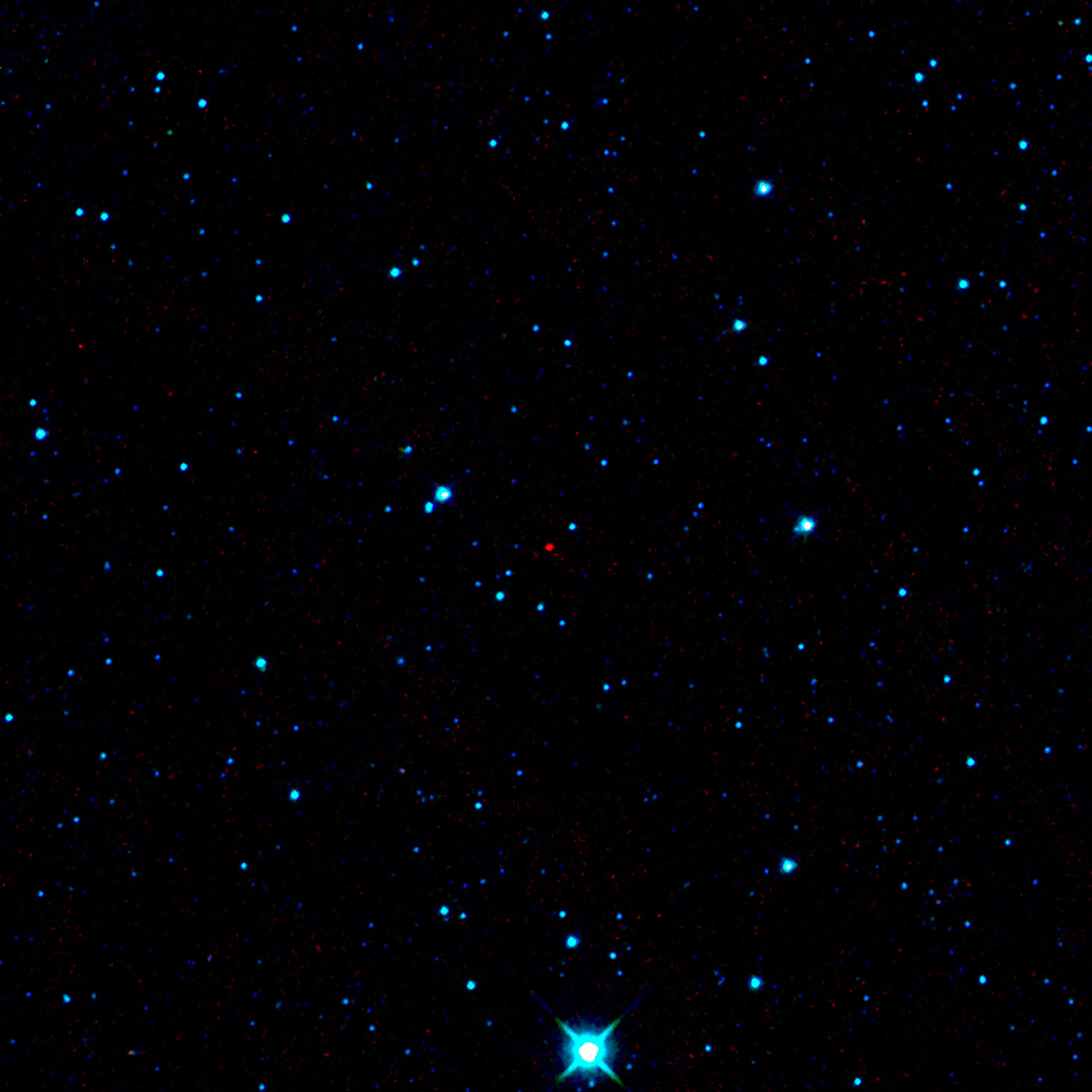
Viewed from space by WISE using a thermal camera, asteroid 2010 AB78 appears redder than the background stars as it emits most of its light at longer infrared wavelengths. In visible light it is very faint and difficult to see.

The Wide-field Infrared Survey Explorer is a 0.4 m infrared-wavelength space telescope launched in December 2009, and placed in hibernation in February 2011. It was re-activated in 2013 specifically to search for near-Earth objects under the NEOWISE mission. By this stage, the spacecraft's cryogenic coolant had been depleted and so only two of the spacecraft's four sensors could be used. Whilst this has still led to new discoveries of asteroids not previously seen from ground-based telescopes, the productivity has dropped significantly. In its peak year when all four sensors were operational, WISE made 2.28 million asteroid observations. In recent years, with no cryogen, NEOWISE typically makes approximately 0.15 million asteroid observations annually. The next generation of infrared space telescopes has been designed so that they do not need cryogenic cooling.

==== Pan-STARRS ====
Pan-STARRS, the "Panoramic Survey Telescope And Rapid Response System", currently (2018) consists of two 1.8 m Ritchey–Chrétien telescopes located at Haleakala in Hawaii. It has discovered a large number of new asteroids, comets, variable stars, supernovae and other celestial objects. Its primary mission is now to detect near-Earth objects that threaten impact events, and it is expected to create a database of all objects visible from Hawaii (three-quarters of the entire sky) down to apparent magnitude 24. The Pan-STARRS NEO survey searches all the sky north of declination −47.5. It takes three to four weeks to survey the entire sky.

==== Space Surveillance Telescope ====
The Space Surveillance Telescope (SST) is a 3.5 m telescope that detects, tracks, and can discern small, obscure objects, in deep space with a wide field of view system. The SST mount uses an advanced servo-control technology, that makes it one of the quickest and most agile telescopes of its size. It has a field of view of 6 square degrees and can scan the visible sky in 6 clear nights down to apparent magnitude 20.5. Its primary mission is tracking orbital debris. This task is similar to that of spotting near-Earth asteroids and so it is capable of both.

The SST was initially deployed for testing and evaluation at the White Sands Missile Range in New Mexico. On 6 December 2013, it was announced that the telescope system would be moved to the Naval Communication Station Harold E. Holt in Exmouth, Western Australia. The SST was moved to Australia in 2017, captured first light in 2020 and after a two and a half year testing programme became operational in September 2022.

==== Spacewatch ====
Spacewatch was an early sky survey focused on finding near-Earth asteroids, founded in 1980. It was the first to use CCD image sensors to search for them, and the first to develop software to detect moving objects automatically in real-time. This led to a huge increase in productivity. Before 1990 a few hundred observations were made each year. After automation, annual productivity jumped by a factor of 100 leading to tens of thousands of observations per year. This paved the way for the surveys active today.

Although the survey is still in operation, in 1998 it was superseded by Catalina Sky Survey. Since then it has focused on following up on discoveries by other surveys, rather than making new discoveries itself. In particular it aims to prevent high priority PHOs from being lost after their discovery. The survey telescopes are 1.8 m and 0.9 m. The two follow-up telescopes are 2.3 m and 4 m.

==== Zwicky Transient Facility ====
The Zwicky Transient Facility (ZTF) was commissioned in 2018, superseding the Intermediate Palomar Transient Factory (2009–2017). It is designed to detect transient objects that rapidly change in brightness, for example supernovae, gamma ray bursts, collisions between two neutron stars, as well as moving objects such as comets and asteroids. The ZTF is a 1.2 m telescope that has a field of view of 47 square degrees, designed to image the entire northern sky in three nights and scan the plane of the Milky Way twice each night to a limiting magnitude of 20.5. The amount of data produced by ZTF is expected to be 10 times larger than its predecessor.

== Follow-up observations ==
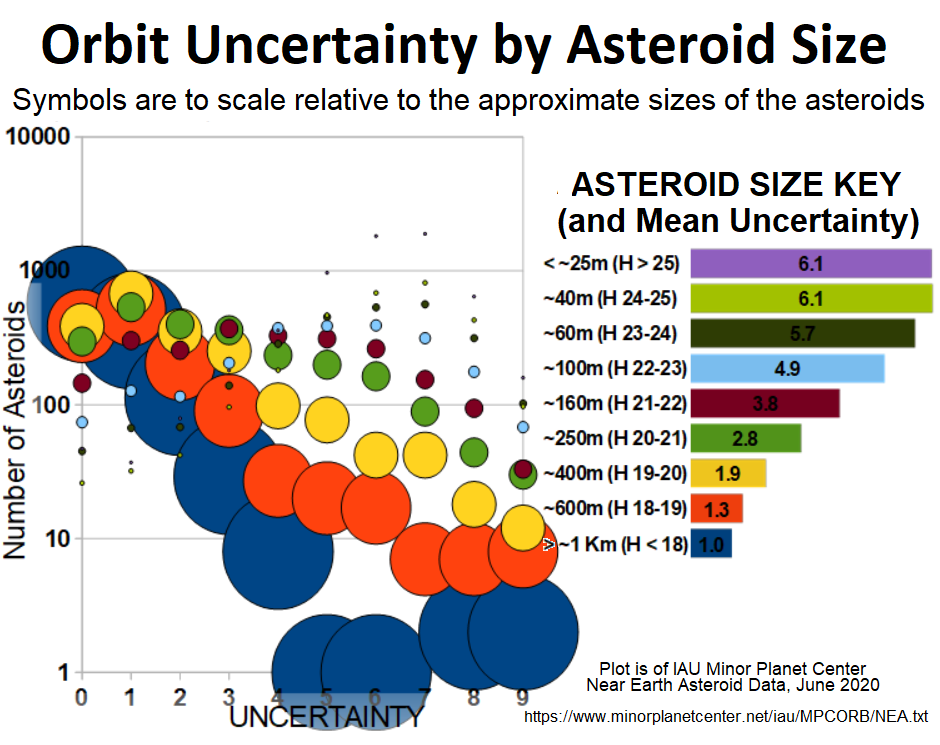
The orbits of kilometre-class NEAs are generally well known as there are usually many follow-up observations. Large numbers of smaller NEAs however have highly uncertain orbits due to insufficient follow-up after discovery. Many have been lost.

Once a new asteroid has been discovered and reported, other observers can confirm the finding and help define the orbit of the newly discovered object. The International Astronomical Union Minor Planet Center (MPC) acts as the global clearing house for information on asteroid orbits. It publishes lists of new discoveries that need verifying and still have uncertain orbits, and it collects the resulting follow-up observations from around the world. Unlike the initial discovery, which typically requires unusual and expensive wide-field telescopes, ordinary telescopes can be used to confirm the object as its position is now approximately known. There are far more of these around the globe, and even a well-equipped amateur astronomer can contribute valuable follow-up observations of moderately bright asteroids. For example, the Great Shefford Observatory in the back garden of amateur Peter Birtwhistle typically submits thousands of observations to the Minor Planet Center every year. Nonetheless, some surveys (for example CSS and Spacewatch) have their own dedicated follow-up telescopes.

Follow-up observations are important because once a sky survey has reported a discovery it may not return to observe the object again for days or weeks. By this time it may be too faint for it to detect, and in danger of becoming a lost asteroid. The more observations and the longer the observation arc, the greater the accuracy of the orbit model. This is important for two reasons:

1. for imminent impacts it helps to make a better prediction of where the impact will occur and whether there is any danger of hitting a populated area.
2. for asteroids that will miss Earth this time round, the more accurate the orbit model is, the further into the future its position can be predicted. This allows recovery of the asteroid on its subsequent approaches, and impacts to be predicted years in advance.

=== Estimating size and impact severity ===
Assessing the size of the asteroid is important for predicting the severity of the impact, and therefore the actions that need to be taken (if any). With just observations of reflected visible light by a conventional telescope, the object could be anything from 50% to 200% of the estimated diameter, and therefore anything from one-eighth to eight times the estimated volume and mass. Because of this, one key follow-up observation is to measure the asteroid in the thermal infrared spectrum (long-wavelength infrared), using an infrared telescope. The amount of thermal radiation given off by an asteroid together with the amount of reflected visible light allows a much more accurate assessment of its size than just how bright it appears in the visible spectrum. Jointly using thermal infrared and visible measurements, a thermal model of the asteroid can estimate its size to within about 10% of the true size.

One example of such a follow-up observation was for 3671 Dionysus by UKIRT, the world's largest infrared telescope at the time (1997). A second example was the 2013 ESA Herschel Space Observatory follow-up observations of 99942 Apophis, which showed it was 20% larger and 75% more massive than previously estimated. However such follow-ups are rare. The size estimates of most near-Earth asteroids are based on visible light only.

If an object is first discovered by an infrared survey telescope, visible-light follow-up can provide an accurate size estimate without further infrared observations. However, none of the ground-based survey telescopes listed above operate at thermal-infrared wavelengths. The NEOWISE satellite's cryogen was exhausted in 2010, but two shorter-wavelength infrared detectors continued operating until the mission ended in 2024. There are currently no active space-based thermal-infrared surveys focused on discovering near-Earth objects. NASA's NEO Surveyor is scheduled to launch no earlier than September 2027.

== Impact calculation ==
=== Minimum orbit intersection distance ===
The minimum orbit intersection distance (MOID) between an asteroid and the Earth is the distance between the closest points of their orbits. This first check is a coarse measure that does not allow an impact prediction to be made, but is based solely on the orbit parameters and gives an initial measure of how close to Earth the asteroid could come. If the MOID is large then the two objects never come near each other. In this case, unless the orbit of the asteroid is perturbed so that the MOID is reduced at some point in the future, it will never impact Earth and can be ignored. However, if the MOID is small then it is necessary to carry out more detailed calculations to determine if an impact will happen in the future. Asteroids with a MOID of less than 0.05 AU and an absolute magnitude brighter than 22 are categorized as a potentially hazardous asteroid.

=== Projecting into the future ===
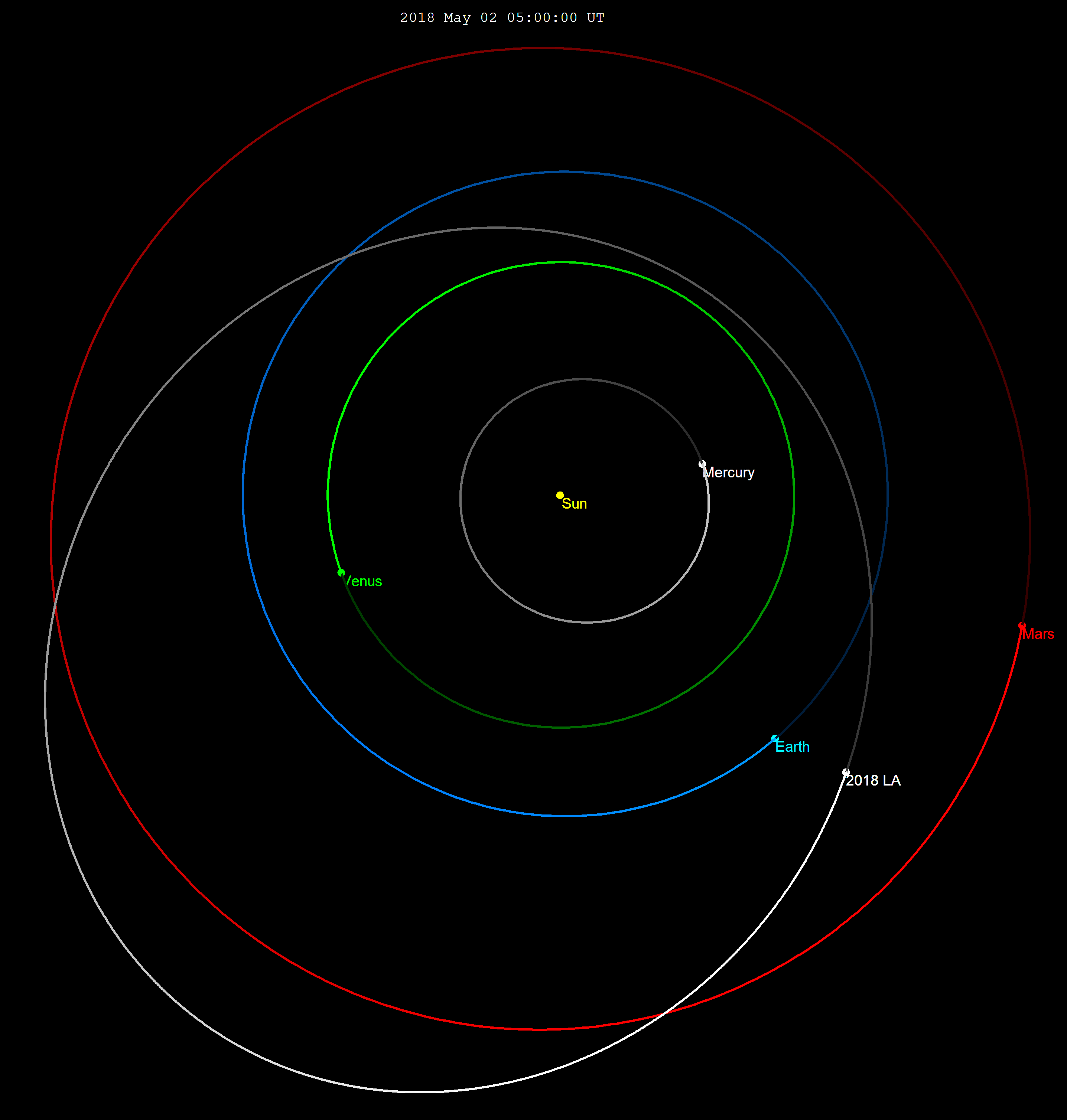
Orbit and positions of 2018 LA and Earth, 30 days before impact. The diagram shows how orbit data can be used to predict impacts well in advance. This particular asteroid's orbit was only known a few hours before impact. The diagram was made later.

Once the initial orbit is known, the potential positions can be forecast years into the future and compared to the future position of Earth. If the distance between the asteroid and the centre of the Earth is less than Earth radius then a potential impact is predicted. To take account of the uncertainties in the orbit of the asteroid, many future projections are made (simulations) with slightly different parameters within the range of the uncertainty. This allows a percentage chance of impact to be estimated. For example, if 1,000 simulations are carried out and 73 result in an impact, then the prediction would be a 7.3% chance of impact.

=== NEODyS ===
NEODyS (Near Earth Objects Dynamic Site) is a European Space Agency service that provides information on near Earth objects. It is based on a continually and (almost) automatically maintained database of near Earth asteroid orbits. The site provides a number of services to the NEO community. The main service is an impact monitoring system (CLOMON2) of all near-Earth asteroids covering a period until the year 2100.

The NEODyS website includes a Risk Page where all NEOs with probabilities of hitting the Earth greater than 10^{−11} from now until 2100 are shown in a risk list. In the table of the risk list the NEOs are divided into:

- "special", as was the case of (99942) Apophis
- "observable", objects which are presently observable and which critically need a follow-up in order to improve their orbit
- "possible recovery", objects which are not visible at present, but which are possible to recover in the near future
- "lost", objects which have an absolute magnitude (H) brighter than 25 but which are virtually lost, their orbit being too uncertain; and
- "small", objects with an absolute magnitude fainter than 25; even when those are "lost", they are considered too small to result in heavy damage on the ground (though the Chelyabinsk meteor would have been fainter than this).

Each object has its own impactor table (IT) which shows many parameters useful to determine the risk assessment.

=== Sentry prediction system ===
NASA's Sentry System continually scans the MPC catalog of known asteroids, analyzing their orbits for any possible future impacts. Like ESA's NEODyS, it gives a list of possible future impacts, along with the probability of each. It uses a slightly different algorithm to NEODyS, and so provides a useful cross-check and corroboration.

Currently, no impacts are predicted (the single highest probability impact currently listed is ~7 m asteroid 2010 RF12, which is due to pass Earth in September 2095 with only a 10% predicted chance of impacting; its size is also small enough that any damage from an impact would be minimal).

=== Impact probability calculation pattern ===
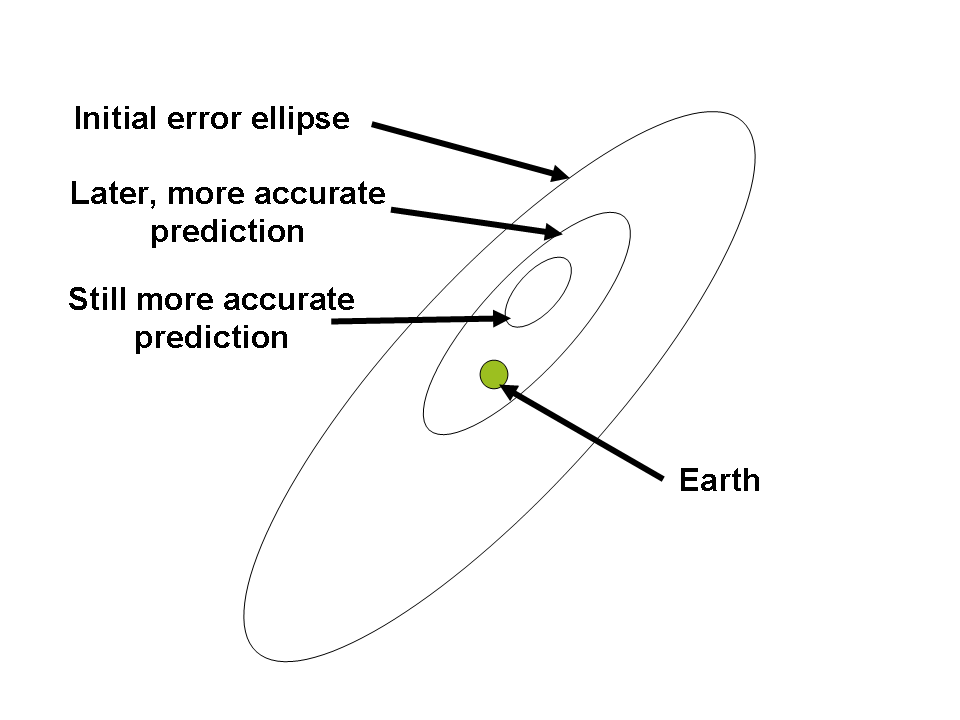
Why predicted asteroid impact probability often goes up, then down

The ellipses in the diagram on the right show the predicted position of an example asteroid at closest Earth approach. At first, with only a few asteroid observations, the error ellipse is very large and includes the Earth. The impact prediction probability is small because the Earth cover a small fraction of the large error ellipse. (Oftentimes the error ellipse extends for tens if not hundreds of millions of km.) Further observations shrink the error ellipse. If it still includes the Earth, this raises the predicted impact probability, since the fixed-size Earth now covers a larger fraction of the smaller error region. Finally, yet more observations (often radar observations, or discovery of a previous sighting of the same asteroid on much older archival images) shrink the ellipse, usually revealing that the Earth is outside the smaller error region and the impact probability is then near zero. In rare cases, the Earth remains in the ever shrinking error ellipse and the impact probability then approaches one.

For asteroids that are on track to hit Earth, the predicted probability of impact never stops increasing as more observations are made. This initially very similar pattern makes it difficult to quickly differentiate between asteroids which will be millions of kilometres from Earth and those which will hit it. This in turn makes it difficult to decide when to raise an alarm as gaining more certainty takes time, which reduces the time available to react to a predicted impact. However raising the alarm too soon has the danger of causing a false alarm and creating a Boy Who Cried Wolf effect if the asteroid in fact misses Earth. NASA will raise an alert if an asteroid has a better than 1% chance of impacting.

In December 2004 when Apophis was estimated to have a 2.7% chance of impacting Earth on 13 April 2029, the uncertainty region for this asteroid had shrunk to 82,818 km.

== Response to predicted impact ==
Once an impact has been predicted the potential severity needs to be assessed, and a response plan formed. Depending on the time to impact and the predicted severity this may be as simple as giving a warning to citizens. For example, although unpredicted, the 2013 impact at Chelyabinsk was spotted through the window by teacher Yulia Karbysheva. She thought it prudent to take precautionary measures by ordering her students to stay away from the room's windows and to perform a duck and cover maneuver. The teacher, who remained standing, was lacerated when the blast arrived and window glass severed a tendon in one of her arms and left thigh, but none of her students suffered lacerations as a result of remaining under the desks. If the impact had been predicted and a warning had been given to the entire population, similar simple precautionary actions could have vastly reduced the number of injuries. Children who were in other classes were injured.

If a more severe impact is predicted, the response may require evacuation of the area, or with sufficient lead time available, an avoidance mission to repel the asteroid. According to expert testimony in the United States Congress in 2013, NASA would require at least five years of preparation before a mission to intercept an asteroid could be launched which was demonstrated by kinetically deflecting a minor planet moon, non-hazardous near-Earth asteroid called Dimorphos with the help of the DART spacecraft. Following a ten-month journey to the Didymos system, the impactor collided with Dimorphos on 26 September 2022 at a speed of around 15,000 miles per hour (24,000 kilometres per hour). The collision successfully decreased Dimorphos's orbital period around Didymos by 32±2 minutes.

== Effectiveness of the current system ==
The effectiveness of the current system can be assessed a number of ways. The diagram below illustrates the number of successfully predicted impacts each year compared to the number of unpredicted asteroid impacts recorded by infrasound sensors designed to detect detonation of nuclear devices. It shows that the success rate is increasing over time, but that the vast majority are still missed.

- Successfully predicted impacts
- Unpredicted impacts

One problem with assessing effectiveness this way is that the sensitivity of infrasound sensors extends to small asteroids, which generally do very little damage. The missed asteroids do tend to be small, and missing small asteroids is relatively unimportant. By contrast, missing a large day-side impacting asteroid is highly problematic, with the unpredicted mid-size Chelyabinsk meteor providing a mild real-life example. In order to assess the effectiveness for detecting the (rare) larger asteroids which do matter, a different approach is needed.

That effectiveness for larger asteroid can be assessed by looking at warning times for asteroids which did not impact Earth but came close. The below diagram for asteroids which came closer than the Moon shows how far in advance of closest approach they were first detected. Unlike asteroid impacts, where infrasound sensors provide ground truth, it is impossible to know for sure how many close approaches were undetected. Of the asteroids that were detected, the diagram shows that about half were not detected until after they had passed Earth. If they had been on course to impact Earth, they would not have been spotted before they hit, primarily because they approached from a direction close to the Sun. This includes larger asteroids such as 2018 AH, which approached from a direction close to the Sun and was detected 2 days after it had passed. It is estimated to be around 100 times more massive than the Chelyabinsk meteor.

- Discovered > 1 year in advance
- Discovered > 7 weeks in advance
- Discovered > 1 week in advance
- Discovered up to 1 week in advance
- < 24 hours warning
- No warning

The number of detections is increasing as more survey sites come online (for example ATLAS in 2016 and ZTF in 2018), but approximately half of the detections are made after the asteroid passes the Earth. The charts below show the warning times of the close approaches listed in the bar graph above, by the size of the asteroid instead of by the year they occurred in. The sizes of the charts show the relative sizes of the asteroids to scale. This is based on the absolute magnitude of each asteroid, an approximate measure of size based on brightness. For comparison, the approximate size of a person is also shown.

Abs magnitude 30 and greater

Silhouette of man standing and facing forward

(size of a person for comparison)

2000–2009	2010–2019

Abs magnitude 29–30

2000–2009	2010–2019

Absolute magnitude 28–29

2000–2009	2010–2019

Absolute magnitude 27–28

2000–2009	2010–2019

Absolute magnitude 26–27

(probable size of the Chelyabinsk meteor)

2000–2009	2010–2019

Absolute magnitude 25–26

2000–2009	2010–2019

Absolute magnitude less than 25 (largest)

2000–2009	2010–2019

As can be seen, the ability to predict larger asteroids has significantly improved since the early years of the 21st century, with some now being catalogued (predicted more than 1 year in advance), or having usable early warning times (greater than a week).

Based on the few successfully predicted asteroid impacts, the average time between initial detection and impact is currently around 9 hours. There is some delay between the initial observation of the asteroid, data submission, and the follow-up observations and calculations which lead to an impact prediction being made.

== Improving impact prediction ==
In addition to the already-funded telescopes mentioned above, two separate approaches have been suggested by NASA to improve impact prediction. Both approaches focus on the first step in impact prediction (discovering near-Earth asteroids) as this is the largest weakness in the current system. The first approach uses more powerful ground-based telescopes similar to the Rubin Observatory. Being ground-based, such telescopes will still only observe part of the sky around Earth. In particular, all ground-based telescopes have a large blind spot for any asteroids coming from the direction of the Sun. In addition, they are affected by weather conditions, airglow and the phase of the Moon.

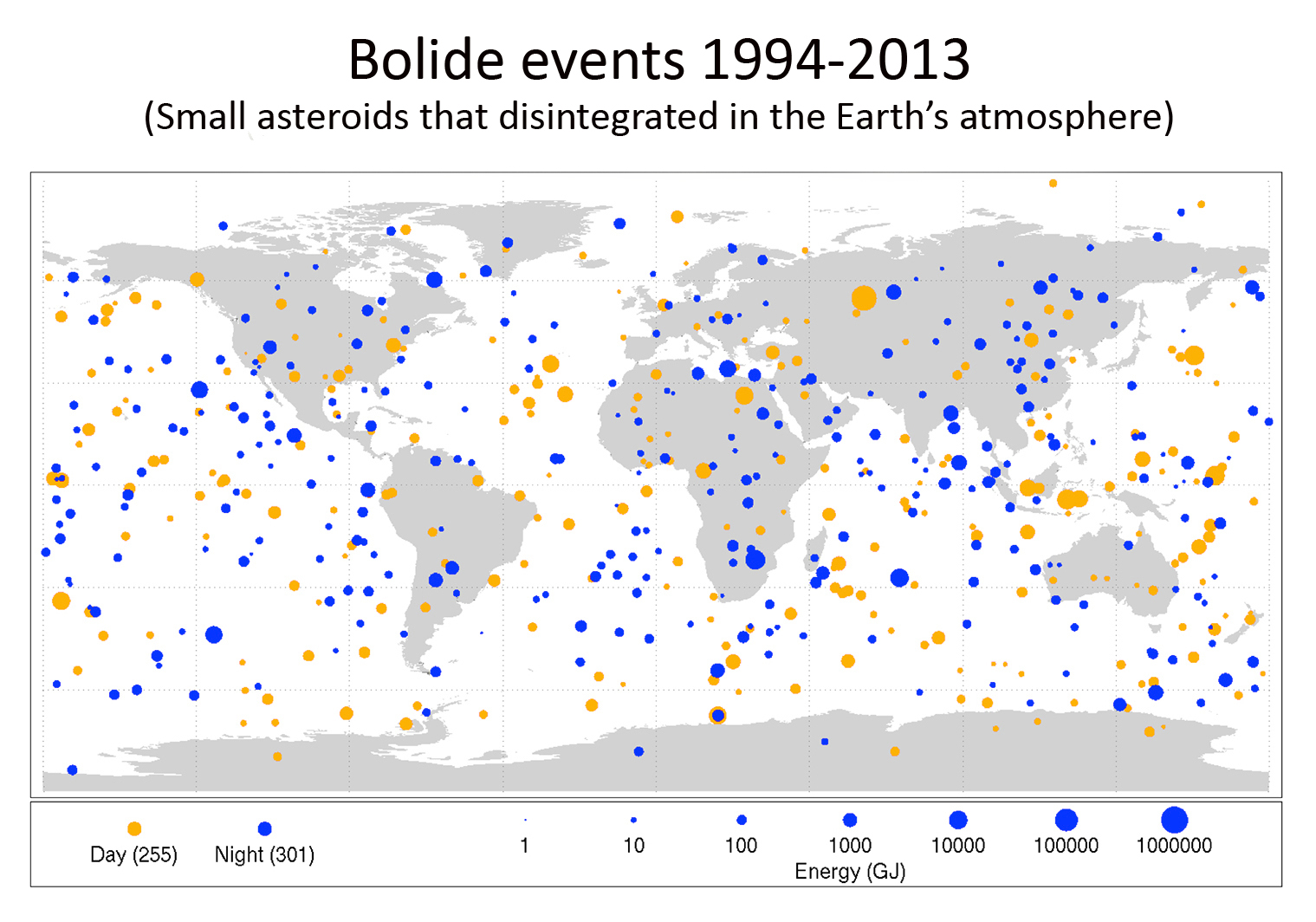
Ground based telescopes can only detect objects approaching on the night-side of the planet, away from the Sun. Roughly half of impacts occur on the day-side of the planet.

To get around all of these issues, the second approach suggested is the use of space-based telescopes which can observe a much larger region of the sky around Earth. Although they still cannot point directly towards the Sun, they do not have the problem of blue sky to overcome and so can detect asteroids much closer in the sky to the Sun than ground-based telescopes. Unaffected by weather or airglow they can also operate 24 hours per day all year round. Finally, telescopes in outer space have the advantage of being able to use infrared sensors without the interference of the Earth's atmosphere. These sensors are better for detecting asteroids than optical sensors, and although there are some ground based infrared telescopes such as UKIRT, they are not designed for detecting asteroids. Space-based telescopes are more expensive, and tend to have a shorter lifespan, so Earth-based and space-based technologies complement each other to an extent. Although the majority of the IR spectrum is blocked by Earth's atmosphere, the very useful thermal (long-wavelength infrared) frequency band is not blocked (see gap at 10 μm in the diagram below). This allows for the possibility of ground based thermal imaging surveys designed for detecting near earth asteroids, though none are currently planned.

A diagram of the electromagnetic spectrum and the types of telescope used to view different parts of it

=== Opposition effect ===
There is a further issue that even telescopes in Earth orbit do not overcome (unless they operate in the thermal infrared spectrum). This is the issue of illumination. Asteroids go through phases similar to the lunar phases. Even though a telescope in orbit may have an unobstructed view of an object that is close in the sky to the Sun, it will still be looking at the dark side of the object. This is because the Sun is shining on the side facing away from the Earth, as is the case with the Moon when it is in a new moon phase. Because of this opposition effect, objects are far less bright in these phases than when fully illuminated, which makes them difficult to detect (see chart and diagram below).

Known asteroids passing <1 LD from Earth
year	discovered on opposition	discovered later	discovered prior
2001	1	1	0
2002	2	0	0
2003	5	0	0
2004	10	0	0
2005	6	0	0
2006	12	0	0
2007	15	0	1
2008	20	0	0
2009	19	0	0
2010	22	0	0
2011	27	0	3
2012	22	0	0
2013	23	0	1
2014	32	0	0
2015	27	0	0
2016	60	0	0
2017	56	0	1
2018	91	0	2

This problem can be solved by the use of thermal infrared surveys (either ground based or space based). Ordinary telescopes depend on observing light reflected from the Sun, which is why the opposition effect occurs. Telescopes which detect thermal infrared light depend only on the temperature of the object. Its thermal glow can be detected from any angle, and is particularly useful for differentiating asteroids from the background stars, which have a different thermal signature.

This problem can also be solved without using thermal infrared, by positioning a space telescope away from Earth, closer to the Sun. The telescope can then look back towards Earth from the same direction as the Sun, and any asteroids closer to Earth than the telescope will then be in opposition, and much better illuminated. There is a point between the Earth and Sun where the gravities of the two bodies are perfectly in balance, called the Sun-Earth L1 Lagrange point (SEL1). It is approximately 1.6 million kilometres (1 million miles) from Earth, about four times as far away as the Moon, and is ideally suited for placing such a space telescope. One problem with this position is Earth glare. Looking outward from SEL1, Earth itself is at full brightness, which prevents a telescope situated there from seeing that area of sky. Fortunately, this is the same area of sky that ground-based telescopes are best at spotting asteroids in, so the two complement each other.

Another possible position for a space telescope would be even closer to the Sun, for example in a Venus-like orbit. This would give a wider view of Earth orbit, but at a greater distance. Unlike a telescope at the SEL1 Lagrange point, it would not stay in sync with Earth but would orbit the Sun at a similar rate to Venus. Because of this, it would not often be in a position to provide any warning of asteroids shortly before impact, but it would be in a good position to catalog objects before they are on final approach, especially those which primarily orbit closer to the Sun. One issue with being as close to the Sun as Venus is that the craft may be too warm to use infrared wavelengths. A second issue would be communications. As the telescope will be a long way from Earth for most of the year (and even behind the Sun at some points) communication would often be slow and at times impossible, without expensive improvements to the Deep Space Network.

=== Solutions to problems: summary table ===
This table summarises which of the various problems encountered by current telescopes are solved by the various different solutions.

Proposed solution	Global coverage	Clouds	Blue sky	Full moon (Note: Around the time of the full Moon, the Moon is so bright that it lights up the atmosphere making faint objects impossible to see for several days per month)	Opposition Effect (Note: This refers to the opposition effect as seen from Earth, the fact that objects outside of the narrow cone centered on Earth are much fainter and harder to spot without using thermal infrared (see diagram above))	Thermal Infrared (Note: Use of thermal infrared allows objects to be seen at all angles as detection doesn't depend on reflected sunlight. It also allows an accurate size estimate of the object which is important for predicting the severity of an impact.)	Airglow
Geographically separated ground based survey telescopes	✓						
More powerful ground based survey telescopes					✓		
Infrared ground based NEO survey telescopes (Note: Although many IR wavelengths are blocked by the atmosphere, there is a window from 8 μm to 14 μm that allows detection of IR at useful wavelengths such as 12 μm. A 12 μm sensor was used by WISE to detect asteroids during its space based mission. Although some ground based IR surveys exist which can detect 12 μm (such as UKIRT Infrared Deep Sky Survey), none are designed to detect moving objects such as asteroids.)					✓	✓	
Telescope in Earth orbit	✓	✓	✓	✓ (Note: Telescopes in Earth orbit are affected to an extent by the glow of the moon, but not in the same way as ground based telescopes where the light from the moon is scattered across the sky by the atmosphere)			✓
Infrared Telescope in Earth orbit	✓	✓	✓	✓	✓	✓	✓
Telescope at SEL1	✓	✓	✓	✓ (Note: Telescopes at SEL1 are primarily affected by the glare of the Earth rather than the Moon, but not in the same way as ground based telescopes where the light from the moon is scattered across the sky by the atmosphere)	✓		✓
Infrared Telescope at SEL1	✓	✓	✓	✓	✓	✓	✓
Telescope in Venus-like orbit		✓	✓	✓	✓	(Note: Telescopes in a Venus-like orbit have no problems with atmosphere but being closer to the Sun, may be too warm to effectively use thermal infrared sensors. This problem could be overcome by using cryogenic coolant but this increases cost and gives the telescope a limited lifespan due to the coolant running out)	✓

==== Near-Earth Object Surveyor ====
In 2017, NASA proposed a number of alternative solutions to detect 90% of near-Earth objects of size 140 m or larger over the next few decades. As the detection sensitivity drops off with size but does not cut off, this will also improve the detection rates for the smaller objects which impact Earth much more often. Several of the proposals use a combination of an improved ground-based telescope and a space-based telescope positioned at the SEL1 Lagrange point. A number of large ground based telescopes are already in the late stages of construction (see above). A space based mission situated at SEL1, NEO Surveyor has now also been funded. It is planned for launch in 2027.

== List of successfully predicted asteroid impacts ==
Below is the list of all near-Earth objects which have or may have impacted the Earth and which were predicted beforehand. This list would also include any objects identified as having greater than 50% chance of impacting in the future, but no such future impacts are predicted at this time. As asteroid detection ability increases it is expected that prediction will become more successful in the future.

Date of impact	Date discovered	Object	Observation arc (minutes)	Warning period (days) (Note: The listed warning period is the time between the first observation and the impact. The time between the first impact prediction and the impact is necessarily shorter, and some of the impacts were actually predicted after they occurred.)	Cataloged (Note: There are two main strategies for predicting asteroid impacts with Earth, the Cataloging Strategy and the Warning Strategy. The Cataloging Strategy aims to detect all near Earth objects which could at some point in the future impact Earth. Accurate orbit predictions are made which can then anticipate any future impact years in advance. The larger and therefore most dangerous objects are amenable to this strategy as they can be observed from a sufficient distance. The more numerous but less dangerous smaller objects cannot so easily be detected this way as they are fainter and cannot be seen until they are relatively close by. The Warning Strategy aims to detect impactors months or days before they reach Earth (NASA 2017 Update on Enhancing the Search and Characterization of Near Earth Objects))	Size (m)	(H) (abs. mag)	Velocity wrt Earth (km/s)	Velocity wrt Sun (km/s)	Impact angle (°) (Note: Degrees from horizontal; an angle of 0° is an Earth-grazing fireball that fails to impact Earth, while an angle of 90° is a fall directly downwards.)	Impact Location	Explosion Altitude (km)	Impact Energy (kt)	Meteorites recovered
2008-10-07 02:46	2008-10-06	2008 TC3	1,145	0.837	No	4.1	30.4	12.8	31.5	25.3	Northern Sudan	37	0.98	✓
2014-01-02 03:04	2014-01-01	2014 AA	69	0.867	No	1.6–3.9	30.9	12.2	35.0	84.6	Central Atlantic	unknown	unknown (Note: 2014 AA exploded over the mid-Atlantic, far from the nearest infrasound detectors. Although some detections were made, reliable figures are not known)	—
2018-06-02 16:45	2018-06-02	2018 LA (Note: 2018 LA was estimated to have an 82% chance of impacting Earth somewhere between the central Pacific Ocean and Africa (Impact path). Several reports from South Africa and Botswana confirmed that it did indeed impact in South-central Africa and additional observations that came in after the impact post-predicted a consistent impact location.)	227	0.354	No	2.7	30.6	16.6	37.6	28.4	Botswana-South Africa border	28.7	1	✓
2019-06-22 21:26	2019-06-22	2019 MO	138	0.564	No	5.3–7.2	29.3	16.0	42.5	35.1	Caribbean Sea, South of Puerto Rico	25	6	—
2022-03-11 21:22	2022-03-11	2022 EB5	112	0.082	No	4.2–5.7	31.3	18.5	41.4	63.4	Arctic Ocean, South of Jan Mayen	33.3	4	—
2022-11-19 08:26	2022-11-19	2022 WJ1	185	0.149	No	0.5–1.2	33.5	14.3	37.9	26.5	Brantford, Ontario, Canada	unknown	unknown	—
2023-02-13 02:59	2023-02-12	2023 CX1	394	0.279	No	0.7	32.8	14.2	37.8	57.3	English Channel	28	unknown	✓
2024-01-21 00:32	2024-01-20	2024 BX1	156	0.114	No	0.4	32.8	15.3	35.7	83.1	Berlin, Germany	unknown	unknown	✓
2024-09-04 16:39	2024-09-04	2024 RW1	618	0.455	No	1.5–2.0	32.1	20.8	38.9	61.0	Northern Luzon, Philippines	25.0	0.2	—
2024-10-22 10:54	2024-10-22	2024 UQ	14	0.074	No	1.2–1.5	32.7	23.6	38.1	61.1	Eastern Pacific Ocean, between Hawaii and California	38.2	0.15	—
2024-12-03 16:14	2024-12-03	2024 XA1	540	0.431	No	0.6–1.6	33.0	15.5	37.7	58.1	Eastern Siberia	unknown	unknown	—
2026-05-15 13:39	2026-05-15	2026 JN4	164	0.230	No	0.5–1.2	33.4	16.5	36.9	62.2 ±7.1	Northern Northern Territory, Australia, Arafura Sea, or New Guinea	unknown	unknown (Note: Although the pre-impact observations of 2026 JN_{4} result in an orbit solution confidently impacting the Earth, the exact location on the planet's surface is still uncertain by over 1000 km. No fireball was reported by any witnesses over the irregularly populated uncertainty region, and no infrasound stations detected an airburst by the small meteoroid. As a result, the Minor Planet Center considers the impact unconfirmed.)	—
2026-09-06 16:07	2026-09-06	2026 RW1	1,600	0.307	No	0.5–1.3	33.3	12.0	30.1	85.6	Indian Ocean, between Java and Western Australia	unknown	unknown	—

In addition to these objects, the meteoroid CNEOS20200918 was found in 2022 in archival ATLAS data, imaged 10 minutes before its 2020/09/18 impact. Although it technically could have been discovered before impact, it was only noticed in retrospect.

There are also a number of objects which have been observed in orbit which may have impacted shortly after being observed, but may not have. It is difficult to know the true number of these possible impactors as unconfirmed tracklets have a wide range of possible orbits, and only a portion of these are consistent with earth impact. One example is A106fgF, an object observed on January 22, 2018, with an observation arc of only 39 minutes. (Note: Using the observation arc, it was only possible to estimate a 9% chance of impact between the South Atlantic, southern Africa, the Indian Ocean, Indonesia, or the Pacific Ocean. Whether the asteroid did impact Earth or not remains uncertain due to its small size and since much of the potential impact area is at sea or sparsely populated.)

== See also ==
- Earth-grazing fireball
- List of asteroid close approaches to Earth
- List of bolides – asteroids and meteoroids that impacted Earth
