= 2024 XA1 =

2024 meteoroid

2024 XA_{1}
Discovery
- Discovered by: V. F. Carvajal
- Discovery site: Kitt Peak – Bok (V00)
- Discovery date: 3 December 2024

Designations
- Alternative designations: C0WEPC5
- Minor planet category: NEO · Apollo

Orbital characteristics
- Epoch 3 December 2024 (JD 2460647.5)
- Uncertainty parameter 2
- Observation arc: 9 hours (540 min)
- Aphelion: 2.541 AU
- Perihelion: 0.852 AU
- Semi-major axis: 1.696 AU
- Eccentricity: 0.4977
- Orbital period (sidereal): 2.21 years
- Mean anomaly: 349.188°
- Mean motion: 0° 26^{m} 45.795^{s} / day
- Inclination: 0.108°
- Longitude of ascending node: 72.255°
- Argument of perihelion: 53.100°
- Earth MOID: 3.27716×10^{−5} AU (4.90256×10^{3} km)

Physical characteristics
- Mean diameter: 0.53–0.57 m (1.7–1.9 ft)
- Synodic rotation period: 1.63+0.06 −0.04 s
- Absolute magnitude (H): 32.974±0.476

2024 XA_{1} is a small meteoroid that fell over eastern Siberia near the city of Olekminsk on 3 December 2024, 16:15 GMT, around 1,000 km (620 mi) east of the Tunguska event impact location. It is the eleventh impact event ever that was successfully predicted, and the fourth in 2024. The impact was witnessed by many people across the Yakutia region of Siberia.

== Discovery ==
The object was discovered at 5:55 UTC on 3 December 2024 at the Kitt Peak National Observatory in Arizona, United States. Initially, with few observations available, the probability of impact was estimated to be below 1%. As more observations were obtained, the ESA's Meerkat Asteroid Guard gave an estimated impact probability of 100% at 7:50 UTC and a P3 impact warning was issued. The time between discovery and impact was around 12 hours, making it the second-longest lead time between discovery and impact, behind only the discovery and impact of 2008 TC3.

== Impact ==
2024 XA_{1} entered Earth's atmosphere at 16:15 UTC over eastern Siberia on the same day of its discovery. The object exploded as a fireball over eastern Siberia, and was visible to many of the people in that sparsely populated region. Currently, no meteorites have been found yet, but it was speculated to be in the remote forests of that region.

== Physical characteristics ==
With a rotation period of just 1.63 seconds, it is the fastest-rotating near-Earth object currently known.

== See also ==
- List of predicted asteroid impacts on Earth
- Asteroid impact prediction
  - 2024 BX_{1}
  - 2024 RW_{1}
  - 2024 UQ
- Chelyabinsk meteor
