= 2024 RW1 =

2024 meteoroid

2024 RW_{1}
- The sequence of four images in which 2024 RW_{1} (inside purple circles) was discovered

Discovery
- Discovered by: Jacqueline B. Fazekas
- Discovery site: Mount Lemmon Obs.
- Discovery date: 4 September 2024

Designations
- Alternative designations: CAQTDL2
- Minor planet category: NEO · Apollo

Orbital characteristics
- Epoch 4 September 2024 (JD 2460557.5)
- Uncertainty parameter 5
- Observation arc: 10.30 h (618.23 min)
- Aphelion: 4.279 AU
- Perihelion: 0.735 AU
- Semi-major axis: 2.507 AU
- Eccentricity: 0.7068
- Orbital period (sidereal): 3.97 yr (1,450 d)
- Mean anomaly: 349.188°
- Mean motion: 0° 14^{m} 53.799^{s} / day
- Inclination: 0.528°
- Longitude of ascending node: 162.457°
- Argument of perihelion: 249.622°
- Earth MOID: 1.34283×10^{−5} AU (2.00885×10^{3} km)

Physical characteristics
- Mean diameter: ~1.0–2.5 m (3.3–8.2 ft)
- Spectral type: C-type asteroid
- Absolute magnitude (H): 32.048±0.343

2024 RW_{1} was a 1-meter-sized asteroid or meteoroid that struck the Earth's atmosphere and burned up harmlessly on September 5, 2024, at around 12:40 a.m. PHT (September 4, 16:40 UTC) above the western Pacific Ocean near Cagayan, Philippines. 2024 RW_{1} is the ninth impact event that was successfully predicted, which was discovered by Jacqueline Fazekas at NASA-funded Catalina Sky Survey.

== Ground observation ==
Despite the presence of Typhoon Yagi over the Philippines that the European Space Agency (ESA) initially said "might obscure the view of the asteroid", several observers reported seeing the fireball, including those who posted videos on social media.

== See also ==
- Asteroid impact prediction
  - 2024 BX_{1}
  - 2024 UQ
  - 2024 XA_{1}
