= 37432 Piszkéstető =

Main-belt asteroid

Discovery
- Discovered by: K. Sárneczky; Z. Heiner
- Discovery site: Piszkéstető Stn.
- Discovery date: 11 January 2002

Designations
- Named after: Piszkéstető Station (discovering observatory)
- Alternative designations: 2002 AE_{11} · 2000 SE_{362}
- Minor planet category: main-belt · (inner); Erigone

Orbital characteristics
- Epoch 4 September 2017 (JD 2458000.5)
- Uncertainty parameter 0
- Observation arc: 22.18 yr (8,103 days)
- Aphelion: 2.7820 AU
- Perihelion: 1.9795 AU
- Semi-major axis: 2.3808 AU
- Eccentricity: 0.1685
- Orbital period (sidereal): 3.67 yr (1,342 days)
- Mean anomaly: 68.396°
- Mean motion: 0° 16^{m} 5.88^{s} / day
- Inclination: 5.4643°
- Longitude of ascending node: 155.32°
- Argument of perihelion: 352.84°

Physical characteristics
- Dimensions: 4.637±0.043 km 5 km (generic at 0.05)
- Geometric albedo: 0.051±0.006
- Absolute magnitude (H): 15.6

37432 Piszkéstető (provisional designation 2002 AE_{11}) is an Erigonian asteroid from the inner regions of the asteroid belt, approximately 4.6 kilometers (2.9 miles) in diameter. It was discovered on 11 January 2002, by the Hungarian astronomers Krisztián Sárneczky and Zsuzsanna Heiner at the Konkoly Observatory's Piszkéstető Station northeast of Budapest, Hungary. The asteroid was later named for the discovering observatory.

== Orbit and classification ==
Piszkéstető is a member of the Erigone family of asteroids. It orbits the Sun in the inner main-belt at a distance of 2.0–2.8 AU once every 3 years and 8 months (1,342 days). Its orbit has an eccentricity of 0.17 and an inclination of 5° with respect to the ecliptic.

The body's observation arc begins 7 years prior to its official discovery observation, with a precovery taken by the Steward Observatory's Spacewatch survey at Kitt Peak in March 1995.

== Naming ==
This minor planet was named in honour of the discovering observatory, the Piszkéstető Station, located in the Mátra Mountains at 944 metres (3,097 ft) above sea level, about 80 kilometers northeast of Hungary's capital. The station belongs to the Konkoly Observatory in Budapest. The approved naming citation was published by the Minor Planet Center on 4 May 2004 (M.P.C. 51981).

== Physical characteristics ==
According to the survey carried out by NASA's Wide-field Infrared Survey Explorer with its subsequent NEOWISE mission, Piszkéstető measures 4.6 kilometers in diameter and its surface has a low albedo of 0.051, which is typical for C-type asteroids. The results agree with a generic absolute magnitude-to-diameter conversion for an assumed albedo of 0.05 and an absolute magnitude of 15.6.

=== Lightcurves ===
As of 2018, the asteroid's composition, shape and rotation period remain unknown.
