= 2024 UQ =

2024 meteoroid

Discovery
- Discovered by: H. Weiland
- Discovery site: ATLAS-HKO
- Discovery date: October 22, 2024

Designations
- Alternative designations: A11dc6D
- Minor planet category: NEO · Apollo

Orbital characteristics
- Epoch 22 October 2024 (JD 2460605.5)
- Uncertainty parameter 2
- Observation arc: 0.233 h (14 min)
- Aphelion: 3.742 AU
- Perihelion: 0.594 AU
- Semi-major axis: 2.168 AU
- Eccentricity: 0.7258
- Orbital period (sidereal): 3.19 yr (1,166 d)
- Mean anomaly: 345.776°
- Mean motion: 0° 18^{m} 31.309^{s} / day
- Inclination: 1.711°
- Longitude of ascending node: 209.139°
- Argument of perihelion: 267.605°
- Earth MOID: 5.67682×10^{−6} AU (849.240 km)

Physical characteristics
- Mean diameter: 1 m
- Absolute magnitude (H): 32.832±0.226

2024 UQ was a one-meter meteoroid that entered the Earth's atmosphere and burned up harmlessly on 22 October 2024 above the Pacific Ocean off the coast of California. 2024 UQ is the tenth impact event that was successfully predicted. It was discovered by the ATLAS survey. The Center for Near-Earth Object Studies reported a fireball at 10:54 (UTC).

== Discovery ==
The Asteroid Terrestrial-impact Last Alert System (ATLAS) first noted this asteroid. Due to 2024 UQ being close to the boundary between two adjacent fields, only hours later was the object reported to be moving. By then, the asteroid had already reached Earth. After prediscovery images identified from the Catalina Sky Survey, and a flash recorded from the meteorological Geostationary Operational Environmental Satellite (GOES) satellite, the impact trajectory was improved, showing an impact site over the Pacific Ocean.

== See also ==
- Asteroid impact prediction
  - 2024 BX_{1}
  - 2024 RW_{1}
  - 2024 XA_{1}
