= (614599) 2010 AB78 =

Near-Earth asteroid

(614599) 2010 AB_{78}
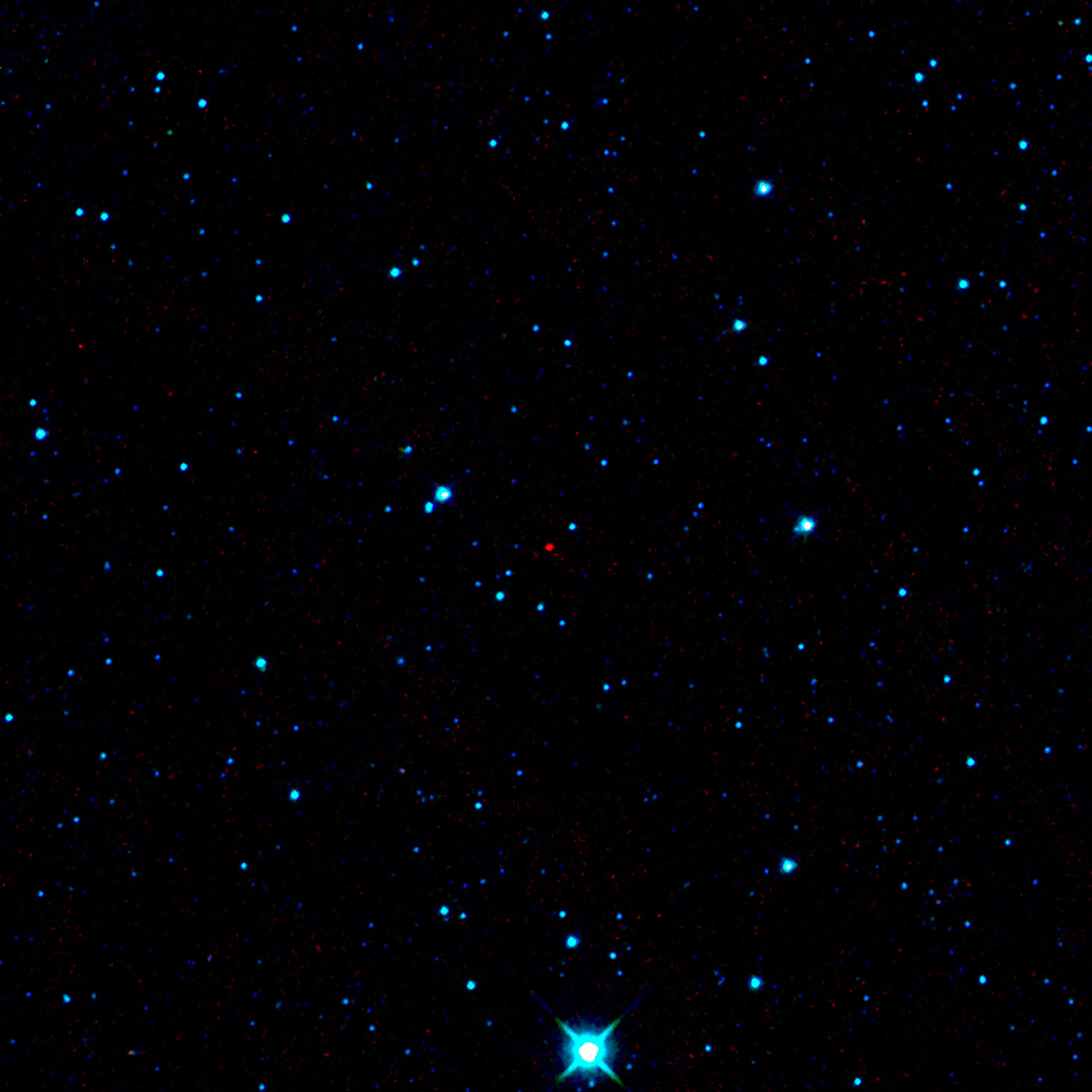
- Stellar field obtained by WISE. The red dot in the center is 2010 AB_{78}.

Discovery
- Discovered by: WISE
- Discovery date: 12 January 2010

Designations
- Minor planet category: NEO · Amor; Mars-crosser

Orbital characteristics
- Epoch 4 September 2017 (JD 2458000.5)
- Uncertainty parameter 0
- Observation arc: 9.97 yr (3,641 days)
- Aphelion: 3.4872 AU
- Perihelion: 1.0216 AU
- Semi-major axis: 2.2544 AU
- Eccentricity: 0.5468
- Orbital period (sidereal): 3.38 yr (1,236 days)
- Mean anomaly: 62.384°
- Mean motion: 0° 17^{m} 28.32^{s} / day
- Inclination: 33.253°
- Longitude of ascending node: 316.93°
- Argument of perihelion: 296.48°
- Earth MOID: 0.2058 AU (80.2 LD)
- Mars MOID: 0.1206 AU (18,000,000 km)

Physical characteristics
- Mean diameter: 1.671±0.010 km
- Geometric albedo: 0.030±0.006
- Absolute magnitude (H): 18.3

(614599) 2010 AB_{78} is a dark asteroid on an eccentric orbit, classified as near-Earth object of the Amor group. It was first observed by the Wide-field Infrared Survey Explorer (WISE) on 12 January 2010. The asteroid measures approximately 1.7 kilometers in diameter and has a low albedo of 0.03, which is rather typical for carbonaceous asteroids.

== First WISE discovery ==
2010 AB_{78} is expected to become the first of the many thousands of discoveries to be accredited to the WISE space telescope. However, the official discoverer will only be defined upon the asteroid's numbering.

The first observation of 2010 AB_{78} by WISE was on January 12, 2010, being observed again the next day. The Mauna Kea Observatory observed it the days 18 and 19 of January, allowing the Minor Planet Center to publish a circular on January 22 confirming the discovery.

== Orbit ==
2010 AB_{78} orbits the Sun at a distance of 1.0–3.5 AU once every 3 years and 5 months (1,236 days). Its orbit has an eccentricity of 0.55 and an inclination of 33° with respect to the ecliptic. Due to its eccentric orbit it is also a Mars-crosser. 2010 AB_{78} has the lowest possible orbital uncertainty, which may have caused it to be numbered.

=== Close approaches ===
This near-Earth asteroid has a minimum orbital intersection distance with Earth of 0.2058 AU (30,800,000 km), which corresponds to 80.2 lunar distances. It does not make any notable close approaches to Earth within the next hundred years.

== Physical characteristics ==
According to the survey carried out by the NEOWISE mission of NASA's discovering WISE observatory, 2010 AB_{78} measures 1.671 kilometers in diameter and its surface has an albedo of 0.030. Objects known for such low albedos are the carbonaceous C, D and P-type asteroids.

As of 2018, no lightcurve has been obtained. The body's rotation period, shape and pole remain unknown.

== Numbering and naming ==
Up until 2021, this minor planet has not been named or numbered. However it has since been numbered 614599 but is still yet to be named.
