= 2024 BX1 =

2024 meteoroid

Coordinates: 52°37′15″N 12°45′40″E

2024 BX_{1}
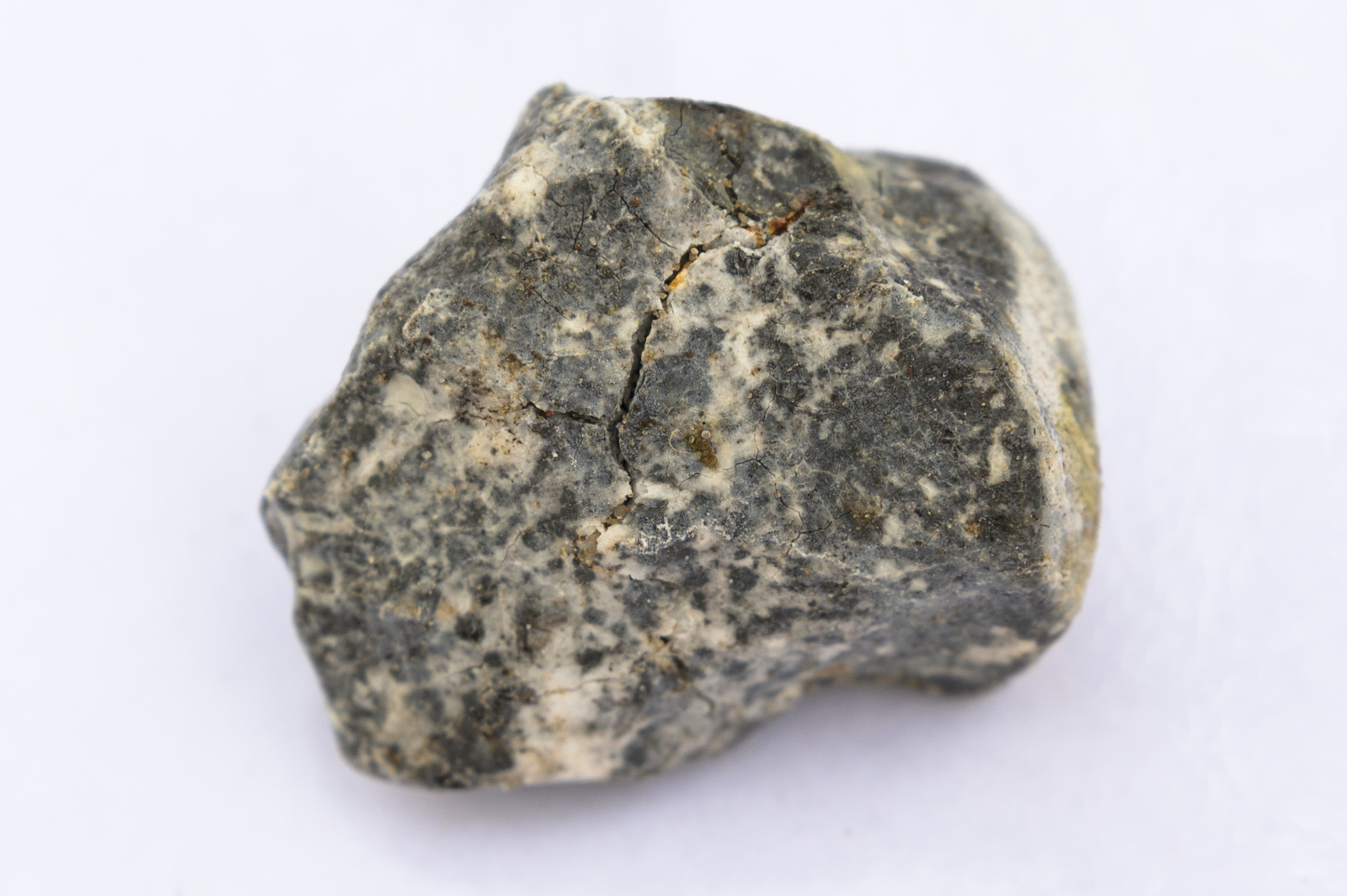
- A fragment of 2024 BX_{1}

Discovery
- Discovered by: Krisztián Sárneczky
- Discovery site: Piszkéstető Stn.
- Discovery date: 20 January 2024

Designations
- Alternative designations: Sar2736 (internal), Ribbeck
- Minor planet category: NEO · Apollo

Orbital characteristics
- Epoch 13 September 2023 (JD 2460200.5)
- Uncertainty parameter 6
- Observation arc: 2.49 h (150 min)
- Aphelion: 1.833 AU
- Perihelion: 0.835 AU
- Semi-major axis: 1.334 AU
- Eccentricity: 0.3740
- Orbital period (sidereal): 1.54 yr (563.0 d)
- Mean anomaly: 246.680°
- Mean motion: 0° 38^{m} 22.038^{s} / day
- Inclination: 7.266°
- Longitude of ascending node: 300.141°
- Argument of perihelion: 243.604°
- Earth MOID: 0.000532 AU (79,600 km)

Physical characteristics
- Mean diameter: 44 cm
- Mass: 140 kg (entry mass); 1.8 kg (recovered)
- Synodic rotation period: 2.5888±0.0002 s
- Spectral type: E-type asteroid
- Absolute magnitude (H): 32.795±0.353; 32.84 –14.4 (bolide maximum)

2024 BX_{1} was a roughly 0.4-metre (1 ft) meteoroid that entered Earth's atmosphere on 21 January 2024 00:33 UTC and disintegrated as a meteor over Berlin. The recovered fragments are known as the Ribbeck meteorite.

It was discovered less than three hours before impact by Hungarian astronomer Krisztián Sárneczky at Konkoly Observatory's Piszkéstető Station in the Mátra Mountains, Hungary. It was observed with the 60 centimetres (23 5/8 inches) Schmidt Telescope. Sárneczky first thought it was a known asteroid because it had a brightness of 18th magnitude, but he could not find it in any catalog, so he reported it to the Minor Planet Center. The fireball was observed by the cameras of the AllSky7 and Fripon networks. 2024 BX_{1} is the eighth asteroid discovered before impacting Earth, and is Sárneczky's third discovery of an impacting asteroid. Before it impacted, 2024 BX_{1} was a near-Earth asteroid on an Earth-crossing Apollo-type orbit.

The bolide had a steep entry of 75.6° and an entry speed of 15.2 km/s (54,720 km/h; 34,000 mph). The bolide was observed with the SDAFO at Tautenburg, which took a spectrum of the bolide. The spectrum was low in iron, consistent with an enstatite-rich body (E-type asteroid). At a height of 55 kilometres (34.2 mi) the meteoroid fragmented into smaller pieces. These primary pieces then broke up again at a height of 39–29 km (24–18 mi). The size and mass were first estimated at 1 meter and 1,700 kilograms (3,748 pounds) based on albedos of S-type asteroids. The radiometric measurements from the European Fireball Network did however suggest a mass of about 1200 kg. Considering it was an E-type asteroid, which have higher albedos, the new estimates are .44 meter and 140 kilograms (309 pounds).

== Ribbeck meteorite ==
First bolide remains were found four days after it entered the Earth's atmosphere. Searches were conducted by the German Aerospace Center (DLR), the Berlin universities, members of the Meteor Working Group and meteorite hunters. The first samples were found by Polish searchers close to the village Ribbeck (Nauen). The meteorite fragments are therefore called Ribbeck meteorites. About 200 pieces were collected, totaling about 1.8 kilograms (4.0 pounds). The largest pieces weighed 212 grams (7.5 ounces) (sample F13) and 171 grams (6.0 ounces) (sample F14). First analysis by scientists of the Natural History Museum in Berlin showed that it was an aubrite, a rare group of meteorites. The results were submitted to the Meteoritical Society in February. Later analysis of the spectrum at UV–mid-infrared wavelengths also found that the sample is consistent with aubrites. It was also shown that it had similar 0.5/0.9 μm band depths when compared to 434 Hungaria, hinting at a possible linkage. 2024 BX_{1} also shows an aphelion that is consistent with the heliocentric distances of the Hungaria family. A study from July 2024 describe the meteorite fragments. According to this study Ribbeck is consistent with a brecciated aubrite. The researchers found that the plagioclase fragments in Ribbeck formed from coarse-grained magmatic rock that cooled slowly and that were fragmented by impacts on the parent body. The albitic plagioclase content is one of the highest among all aubrites, similar to the aubrite of Bishopville (see Meteorite fall). This causes Europium measurements to be higher in both meteorites. The rock showed signs of shock metamorphism and terrestrial weathering. The 4 days of weathering in the snow/melted snow gave the samples a brown color and the breakdown of sulfides gave the samples a smell of hydrogen sulfide (rotten eggs). Some minerals (oldhamite, a Cr-rich phase and a Ti-rich phase) showed strong alteration, but it is unclear if this happened partially before the meteorite impact or if it is only due to weathering. The researchers believe that the parent body of Ribbeck is 4.5 billion years old. Aubrites formed very early within a few million years after the formation of calcium-aluminium-rich inclusions (~4.56 billion years old) and for Ribbeck ages were determined with the help of K–Ar dating (~3.3–3.7 billion years) and Uranium/Thorium-Helium dating (~2.3–2.5 billion years). These younger ages are indications for impact events on the parent body. The cosmic ray exposure (CRE) age of Ribbeck is 55–62 million years. CRE dating is a technique to determine how long a sample was exposed to space (see surface exposure dating).

Composition of 2024 BX_{1}
Mineral	Bischoff et al.
FeO-free enstatite	76 ±3 vol%
albitic plagioclase	15.0 ±2.5 vol%
forsterite	5.5 ±1.5 vol%
opaque phases a) Metals, including kamacite with Nickel-rich grains (taenite or tetrataenite) b) Schreibersite c) Sulfides: troilite, djerfisherite, alabandite, oldhamite, Cr-rich phase, Ti-rich phase	3.5 ±1.0 vol%
nearly FeO-free diopside	traces
K-feldspar	traces
S-bearing K-feldspar-like phase	traces

Researchers described the meteorite fragments as "cosmic pears", in remembrance of the ballad Herr von Ribbeck auf Ribbeck im Havelland by Theodor Fontane. According to the ballad Ribbeck gave pears to passing children and after his death a legendary pear tree did grow on his grave, providing children with free pears.

== Exhibitions ==
Seven pieces of the meteorite were exhibited at the Natural History Museum in Berlin for a few weeks in March 2024. A 26 grams (0.92 ounces) piece discovered by Antal Igaz is exposed at the Konkoly Observatory in Hungary. A 5.3 grams (0.19 ounces) piece found by Szymon Kozłowski is on display at the Astronomical Observatory of the University of Warsaw.

== Gallery ==
2024 BX_{1} bolide on 21 January 2024 over Berlin

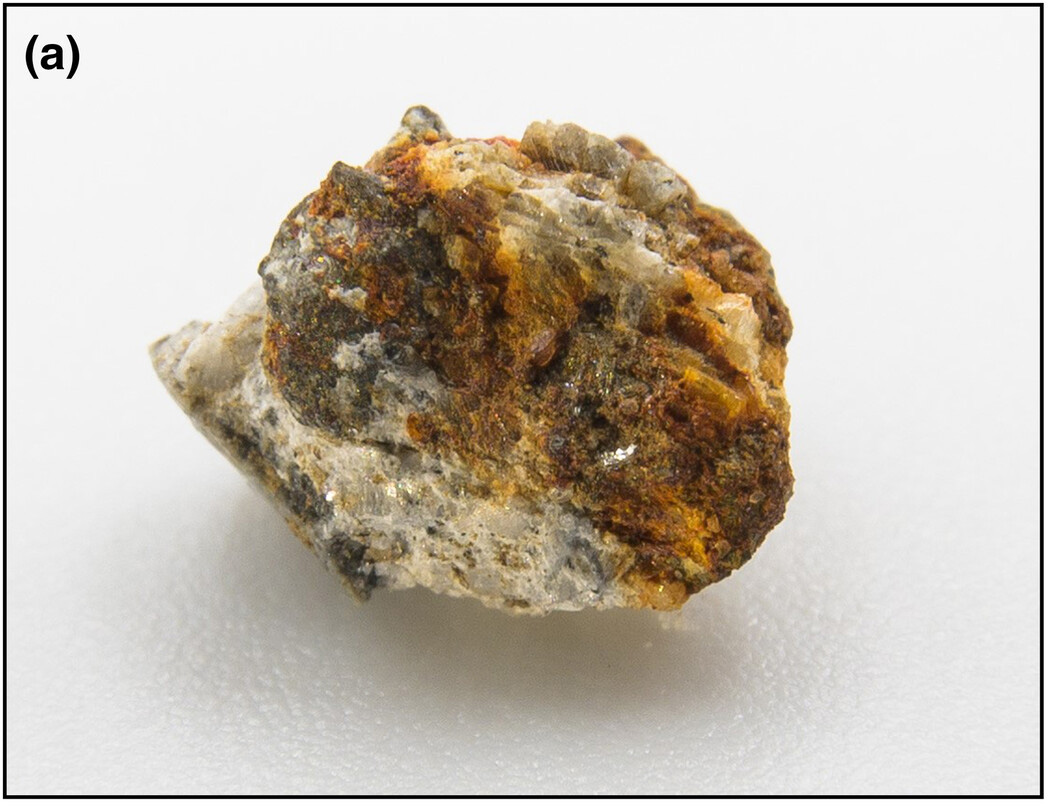
Sample of Ribbeck found after 6 days and showing terrestrial alteration, giving the sample a brown color

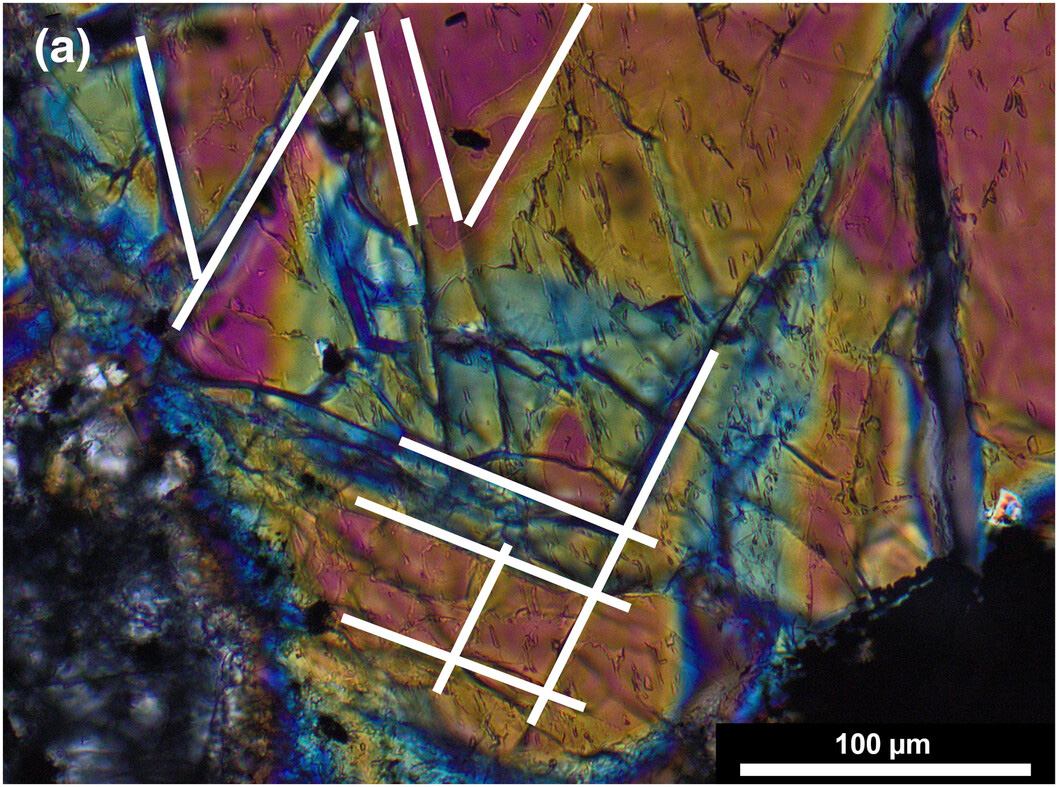
Olivine in Ribbeck, showing fracture lines, indicative of shock metamorphism

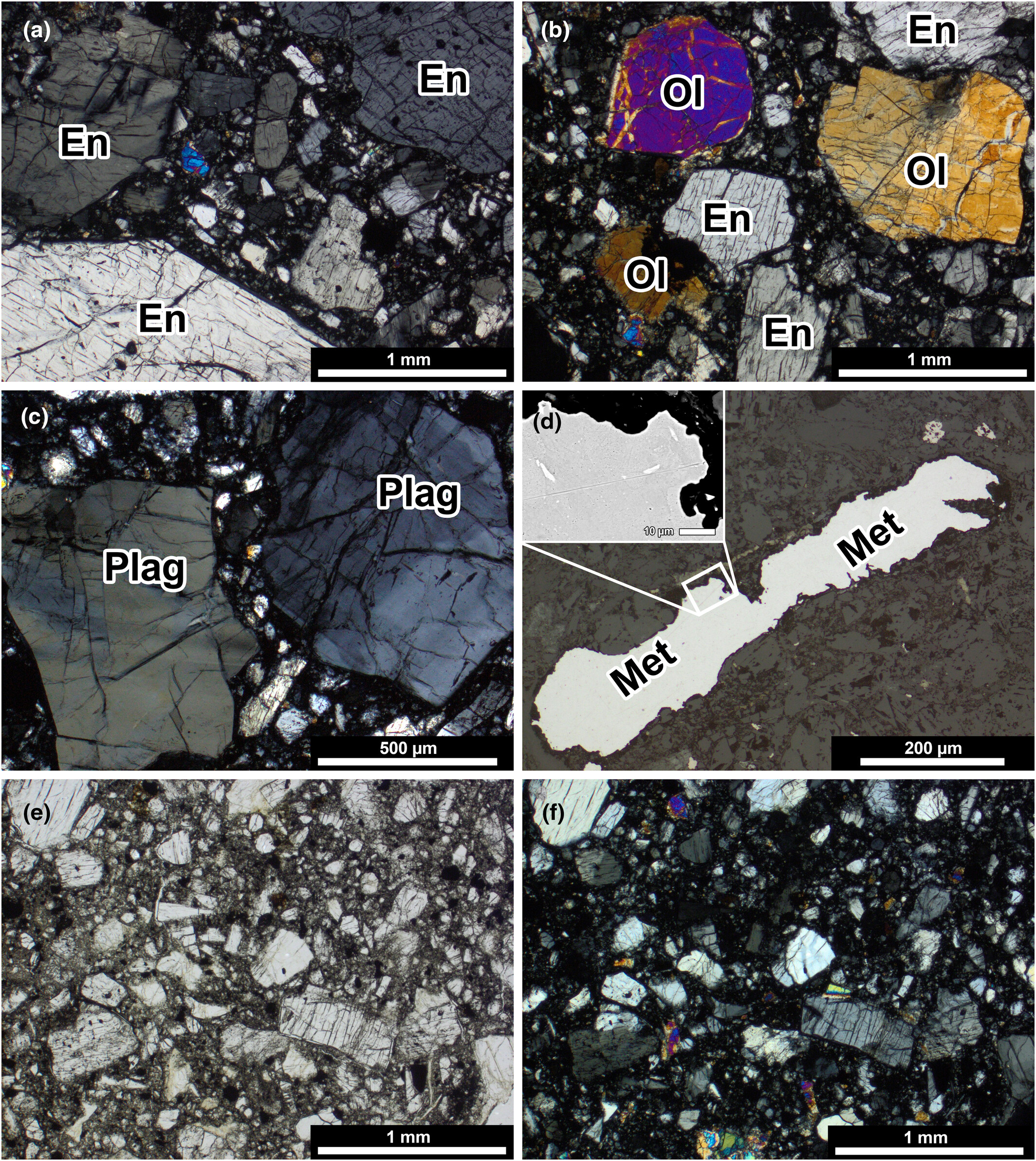
Thin sections of 2024 BX_{1} samples, with enstatite crystals (En), olivine (Ol), plagioclase (Plag) and metal (Met)

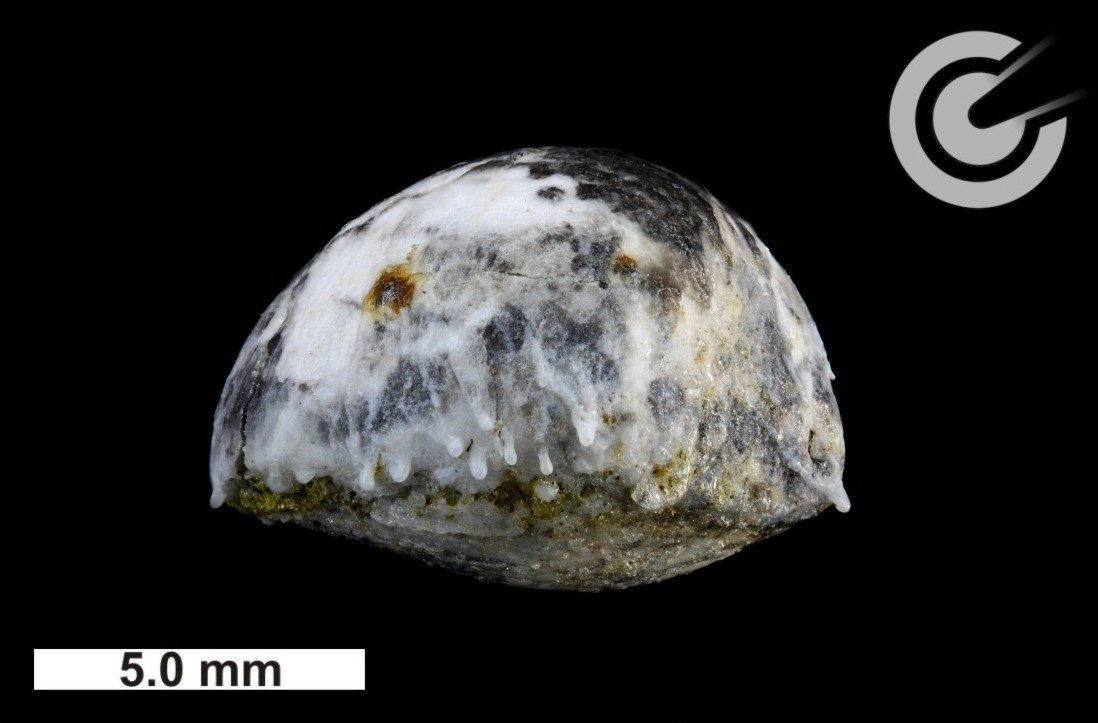
Ribbeck Meteorite, flight-oriented individual (Bullet with white fusion crust, Sample F159), lateral view with Roll-Over Lip

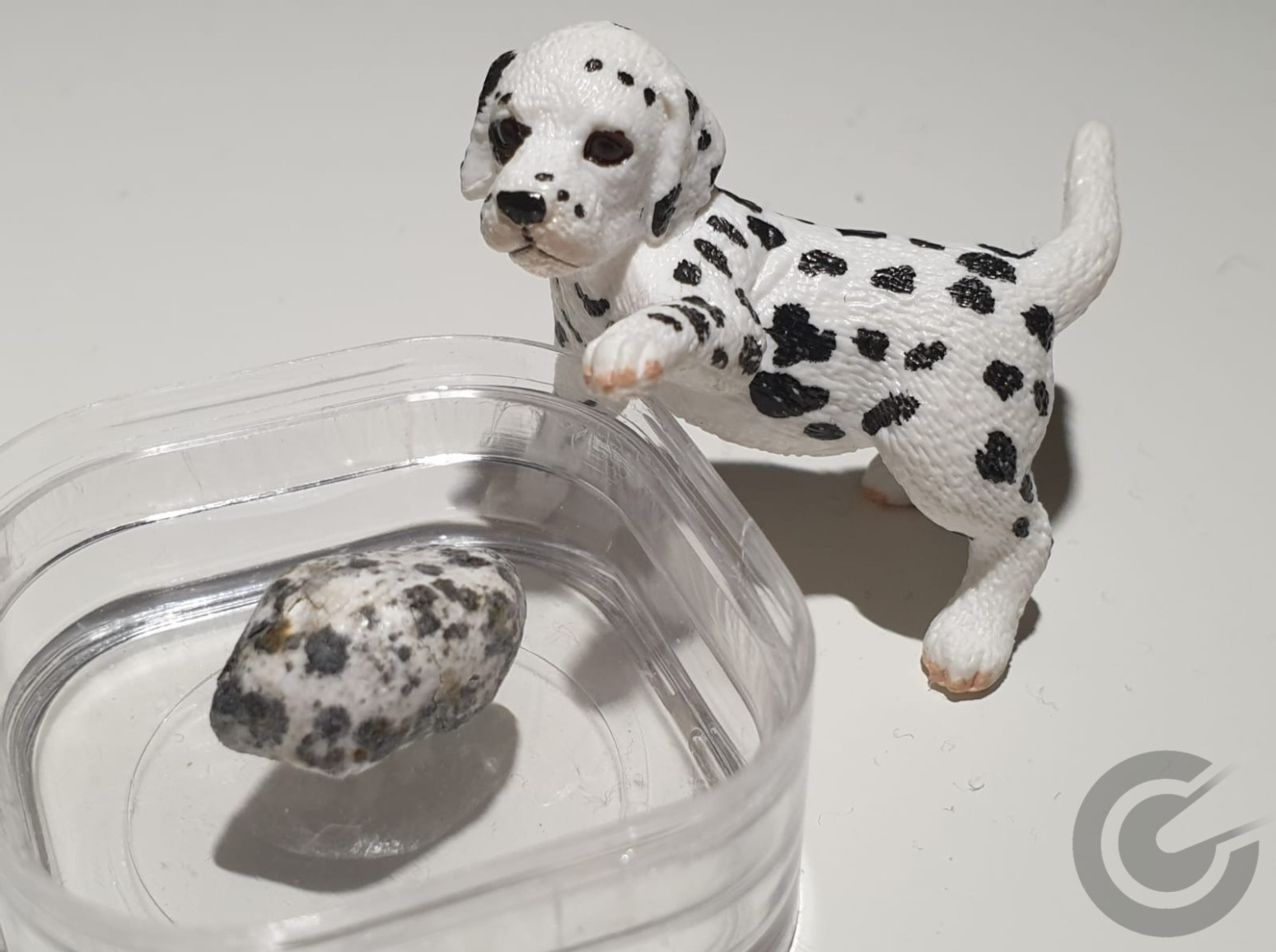
Ribbeck Meteorite with atypical coloration, Individual (Dalmatian Stone, Sample F69) with Dalmatian Model

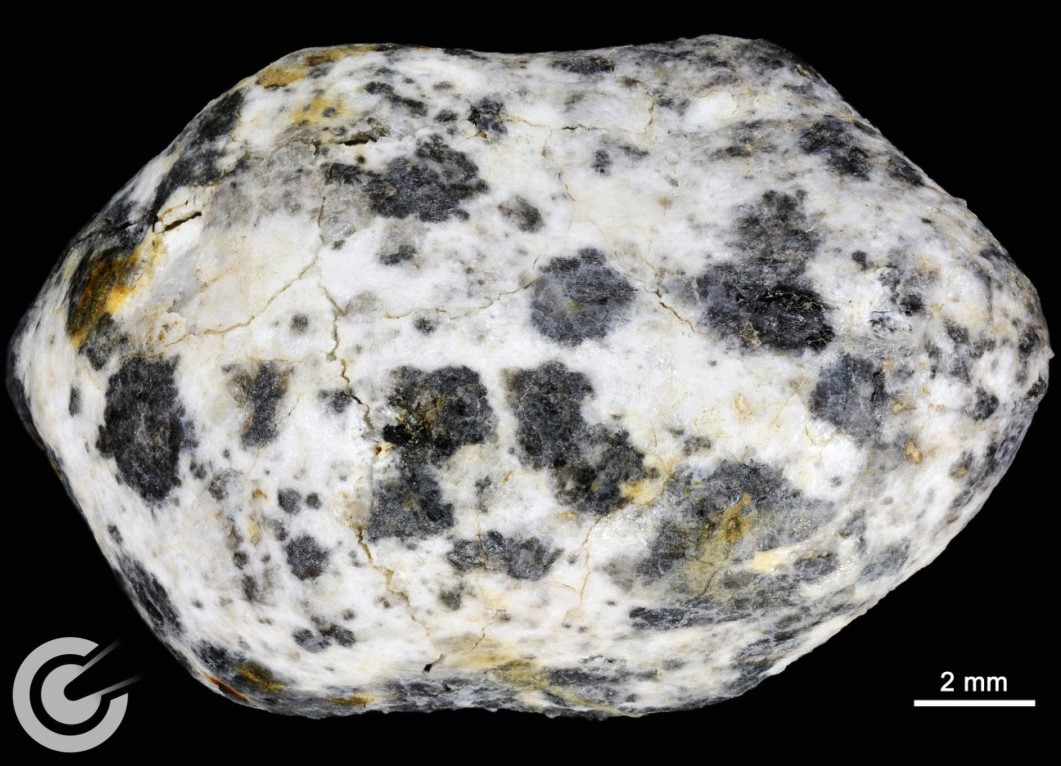
Ribbeck Meteorite with atypical coloration, Individual (Dalmatian Stone, Sample F69)

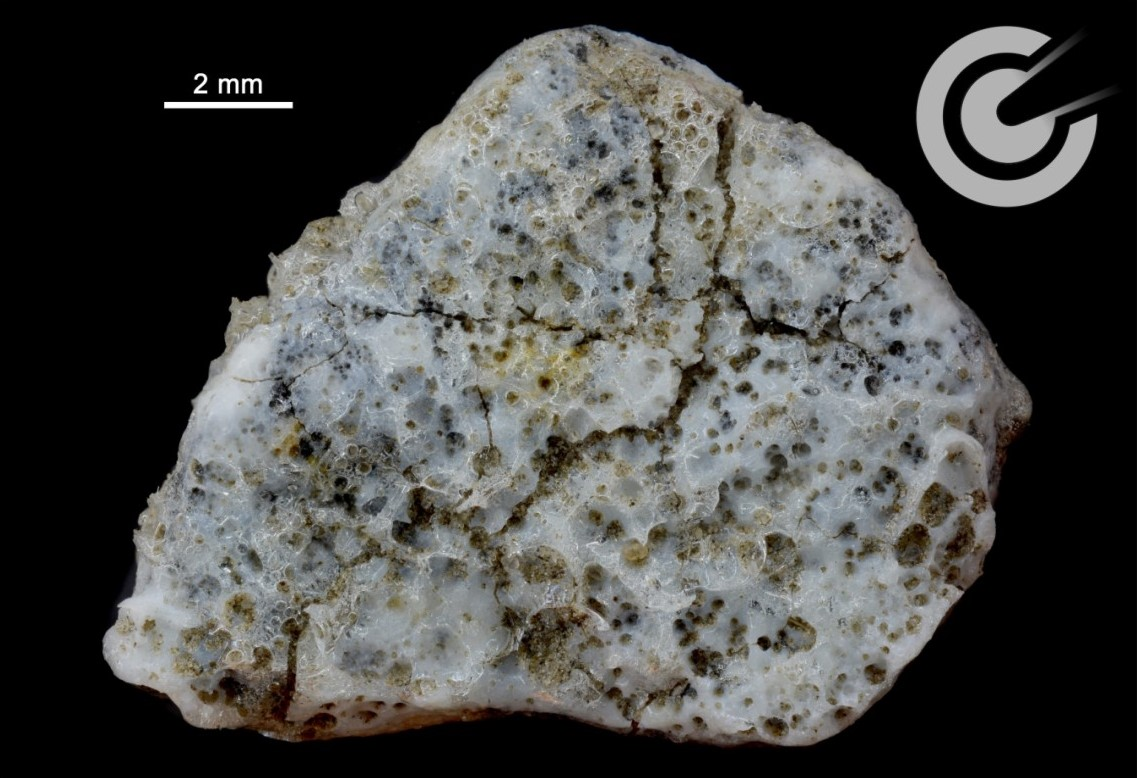
Ribbeck Meteorite, Individual (Spectacular fusion crust, Sample F82, Rear-Facing Side)

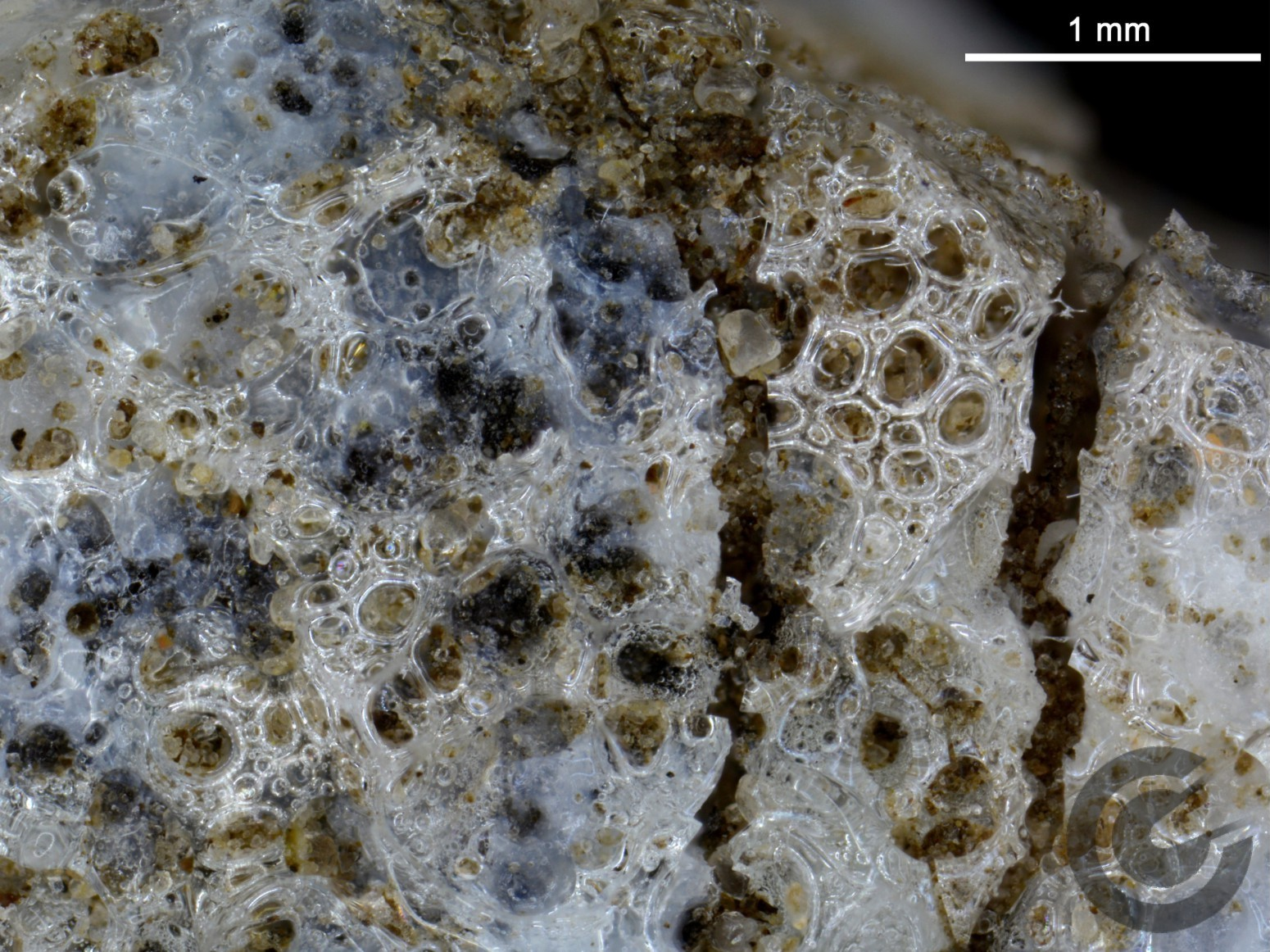
Ribbeck Meteorite, Individual (Spectacular fusion crust, Sample F82, Rear-Facing Side, Detail)

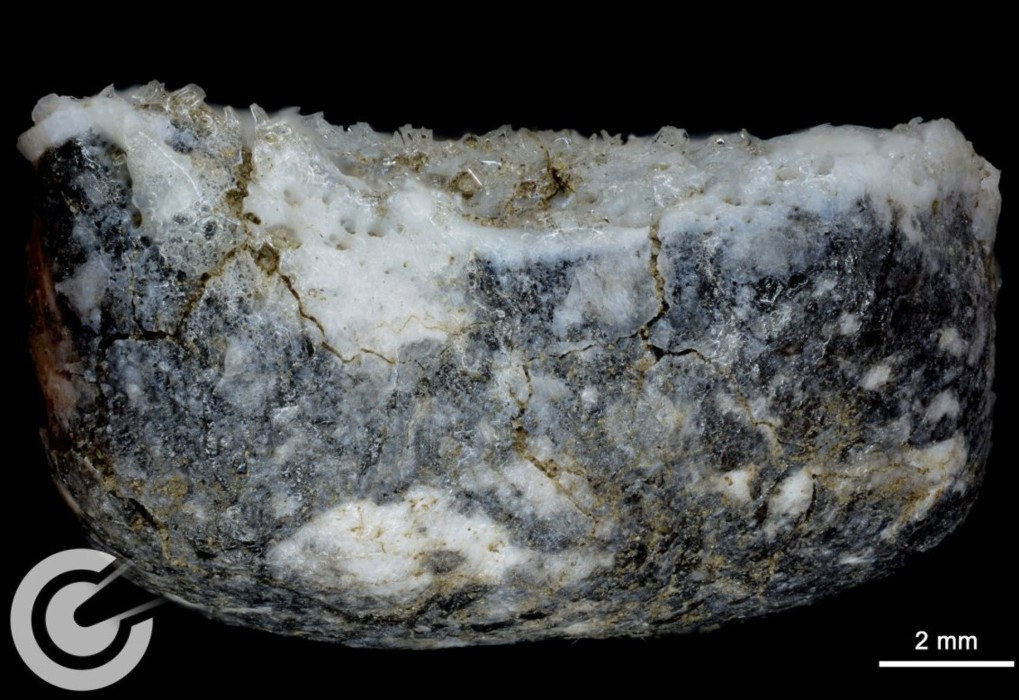
Ribbeck Meteorite, flight-oriented individual (Spectacular fusion crust, Sample F82, lateral view)

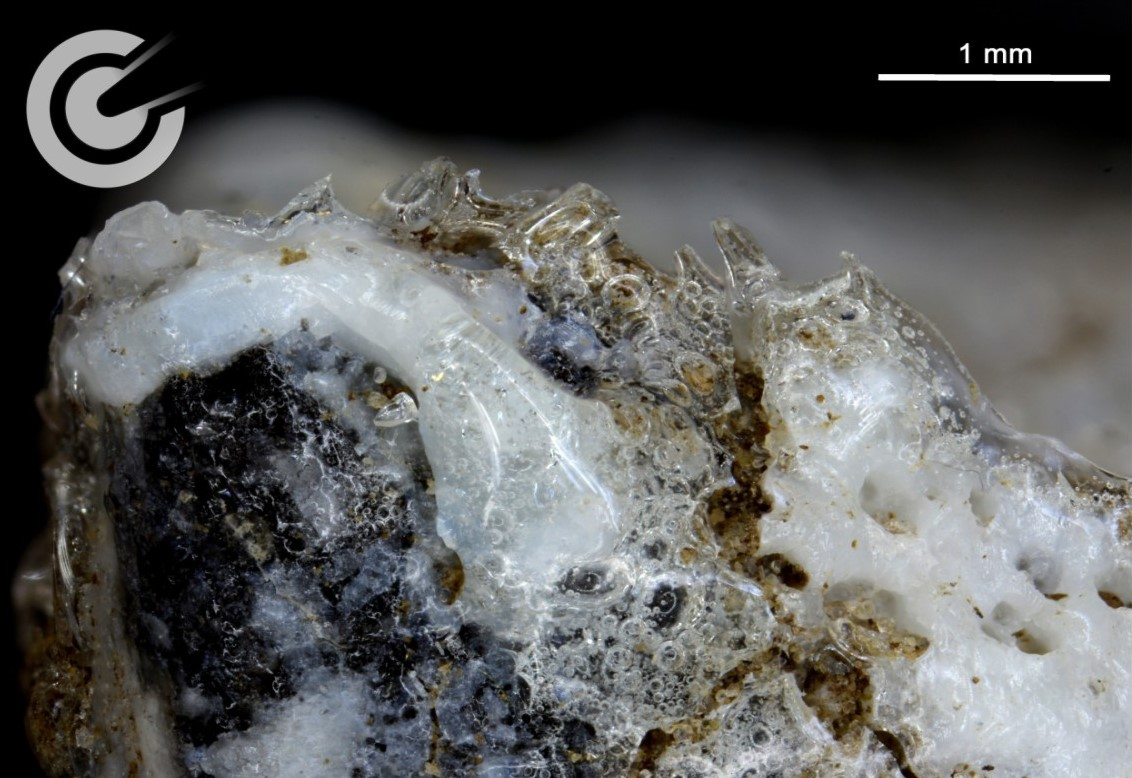
Ribbeck Meteorite (Spectacular fusion crust, Sample F82, lateral view with rim)

== See also ==
- Impact event
- Asteroid impact prediction
  - 2024 RW_{1}
  - 2024 UQ
  - 2024 XA_{1}
