= List of minor planets: 614001–615000 =

The following is a partial list of minor planets, running from minor-planet number 614001 through 615000, inclusive. The primary data for this and other partial lists is based on JPL's "Small-Body Orbital Elements" and data available from the Minor Planet Center. Critical list information is also provided by the MPC, unless otherwise specified from Lowell Observatory. A detailed description of the table's columns and additional sources are given on the main page including a complete list of every page in this series, and a statistical break-up on the dynamical classification of minor planets.

Also see the summary list of all named bodies in numerical and alphabetical order, and the corresponding naming citations for the number range of this particular list. New namings may only be added to this list after official publication, as the preannouncement of names is condemned by the Working Group for Small Bodies Nomenclature of the International Astronomical Union.

Near-Earth obj.	MBA (inner)	MBA (outer)	Centaur
Mars-crosser	MBA (middle)	Jupiter trojan	Trans-Neptunian obj.
Unclassified

== 614001–614100 ==
Designation			Discovery			Properties		Ref
Permanent	Provisional	Named after	Date	Site	Discoverer(s)	Category	Diam.	Ref
614001	2008 PC_{19}	—	August 7, 2008	Kitt Peak	Spacewatch	·	1.0 km	MPC · JPL
614002	2008 PA_{20}	—	August 7, 2008	Kitt Peak	Spacewatch	·	970 m	MPC · JPL
614003	2008 QO_{4}	—	August 20, 2008	Kitt Peak	Spacewatch	GEF	800 m	MPC · JPL
614004	2008 QT_{6}	—	August 21, 2008	Kitt Peak	Spacewatch	·	530 m	MPC · JPL
614005	2008 QC_{7}	—	August 26, 2008	Parc National des Cévennes	C. Demeautis, J.-M. Lopez	·	950 m	MPC · JPL
614006	2008 QO_{8}	—	August 25, 2008	La Sagra	OAM	·	1.5 km	MPC · JPL
614007	2008 QF_{9}	—	August 25, 2008	La Sagra	OAM	·	700 m	MPC · JPL
614008	2008 QZ_{12}	—	August 26, 2008	La Sagra	OAM	MAS	860 m	MPC · JPL
614009	2008 QC_{16}	—	August 27, 2008	Parc National des Cévennes	C. Demeautis, J.-M. Lopez	·	860 m	MPC · JPL
614010	2008 QF_{19}	—	August 21, 2008	Kitt Peak	Spacewatch	V	510 m	MPC · JPL
614011	2008 QQ_{23}	—	August 30, 2008	Bergisch Gladbach	W. Bickel	·	670 m	MPC · JPL
614012	2008 QY_{23}	—	August 28, 2008	Parc National des Cévennes	C. Demeautis, J.-M. Lopez	·	3.8 km	MPC · JPL
614013	2008 QW_{35}	—	August 21, 2008	Kitt Peak	Spacewatch	·	1.1 km	MPC · JPL
614014	2008 QT_{37}	—	August 21, 2008	Kitt Peak	Spacewatch	·	2.1 km	MPC · JPL
614015	2008 QK_{42}	—	August 24, 2008	Kitt Peak	Spacewatch	L4 · ERY	6.4 km	MPC · JPL
614016	2008 QZ_{43}	—	August 26, 2008	Siding Spring	SSS	·	1.6 km	MPC · JPL
614017	2008 QE_{44}	—	August 21, 2008	Kitt Peak	Spacewatch	·	950 m	MPC · JPL
614018	2008 QY_{44}	—	August 24, 2008	Socorro	LINEAR	MAS	640 m	MPC · JPL
614019	2008 RF_{3}	—	September 2, 2008	Kitt Peak	Spacewatch	·	1.1 km	MPC · JPL
614020	2008 RK_{3}	—	September 2, 2008	Kitt Peak	Spacewatch	·	1.1 km	MPC · JPL
614021	2008 RL_{8}	—	September 3, 2008	Kitt Peak	Spacewatch	·	1.1 km	MPC · JPL
614022	2008 RV_{13}	—	September 4, 2008	Kitt Peak	Spacewatch	·	420 m	MPC · JPL
614023	2008 RA_{19}	—	September 4, 2008	Kitt Peak	Spacewatch	·	860 m	MPC · JPL
614024	2008 RM_{21}	—	September 4, 2008	Kitt Peak	Spacewatch	·	1.3 km	MPC · JPL
614025	2008 RB_{24}	—	September 5, 2008	Socorro	LINEAR	·	2.3 km	MPC · JPL
614026	2008 RQ_{31}	—	September 2, 2008	Kitt Peak	Spacewatch	THM	1.7 km	MPC · JPL
614027	2008 RZ_{33}	—	September 2, 2008	Kitt Peak	Spacewatch	·	650 m	MPC · JPL
614028	2008 RW_{43}	—	September 2, 2008	Kitt Peak	Spacewatch	·	1.1 km	MPC · JPL
614029	2008 RN_{50}	—	September 3, 2008	Kitt Peak	Spacewatch	·	1.3 km	MPC · JPL
614030	2008 RD_{58}	—	September 3, 2008	Kitt Peak	Spacewatch	·	1.7 km	MPC · JPL
614031	2008 RK_{58}	—	September 3, 2008	Kitt Peak	Spacewatch	L4	8.5 km	MPC · JPL
614032	2008 RP_{65}	—	September 4, 2008	Kitt Peak	Spacewatch	KOR	1.3 km	MPC · JPL
614033	2008 RV_{66}	—	September 4, 2008	Kitt Peak	Spacewatch	·	1.6 km	MPC · JPL
614034	2008 RU_{81}	—	September 4, 2008	Kitt Peak	Spacewatch	·	2.2 km	MPC · JPL
614035	2008 RD_{88}	—	September 5, 2008	Kitt Peak	Spacewatch	·	1.9 km	MPC · JPL
614036	2008 RJ_{88}	—	September 5, 2008	Kitt Peak	Spacewatch	L4	7.0 km	MPC · JPL
614037	2008 RA_{89}	—	September 5, 2008	Kitt Peak	Spacewatch	·	2.3 km	MPC · JPL
614038	2008 RW_{92}	—	September 6, 2008	Kitt Peak	Spacewatch	·	800 m	MPC · JPL
614039	2008 RA_{105}	—	September 6, 2008	Mount Lemmon	Mount Lemmon Survey	MAS	650 m	MPC · JPL
614040	2008 RH_{110}	—	September 3, 2008	Kitt Peak	Spacewatch	(5)	980 m	MPC · JPL
614041	2008 RA_{112}	—	September 4, 2008	Kitt Peak	Spacewatch	L4	6.1 km	MPC · JPL
614042	2008 RE_{117}	—	September 8, 2008	Kitt Peak	Spacewatch	·	990 m	MPC · JPL
614043	2008 RE_{121}	—	September 2, 2008	Kitt Peak	Spacewatch	·	980 m	MPC · JPL
614044	2008 RL_{122}	—	September 3, 2008	Kitt Peak	Spacewatch	L4	6.2 km	MPC · JPL
614045	2008 RY_{124}	—	September 6, 2008	Kitt Peak	Spacewatch	L4	6.5 km	MPC · JPL
614046	2008 RS_{126}	—	September 4, 2008	Kitt Peak	Spacewatch	·	1.6 km	MPC · JPL
614047	2008 RK_{127}	—	September 6, 2008	Kitt Peak	Spacewatch	L4 · ERY	7.5 km	MPC · JPL
614048	2008 RT_{131}	—	September 6, 2008	Kitt Peak	Spacewatch	·	440 m	MPC · JPL
614049	2008 RM_{136}	—	September 4, 2008	Kitt Peak	Spacewatch	·	1.2 km	MPC · JPL
614050	2008 RE_{137}	—	September 5, 2008	Kitt Peak	Spacewatch	(5)	1.0 km	MPC · JPL
614051	2008 RY_{140}	—	September 9, 2008	Mount Lemmon	Mount Lemmon Survey	·	4.4 km	MPC · JPL
614052	2008 SG_{2}	—	September 22, 2008	Goodricke-Pigott	R. A. Tucker	·	840 m	MPC · JPL
614053	2008 SF_{13}	—	September 19, 2008	Kitt Peak	Spacewatch	·	1.3 km	MPC · JPL
614054	2008 SC_{29}	—	September 19, 2008	Kitt Peak	Spacewatch	·	630 m	MPC · JPL
614055	2008 SU_{32}	—	September 20, 2008	Kitt Peak	Spacewatch	·	490 m	MPC · JPL
614056	2008 SH_{33}	—	September 20, 2008	Mount Lemmon	Mount Lemmon Survey	·	1.3 km	MPC · JPL
614057	2008 SL_{36}	—	September 20, 2008	Kitt Peak	Spacewatch	·	2.8 km	MPC · JPL
614058	2008 SG_{38}	—	September 20, 2008	Kitt Peak	Spacewatch	·	1.1 km	MPC · JPL
614059	2008 SG_{40}	—	September 20, 2008	Kitt Peak	Spacewatch	·	3.2 km	MPC · JPL
614060	2008 SL_{40}	—	September 20, 2008	Kitt Peak	Spacewatch	NYS	1.1 km	MPC · JPL
614061	2008 SE_{45}	—	September 20, 2008	Kitt Peak	Spacewatch	MAS	490 m	MPC · JPL
614062	2008 SL_{47}	—	September 20, 2008	Kitt Peak	Spacewatch	·	950 m	MPC · JPL
614063	2008 SY_{54}	—	September 20, 2008	Mount Lemmon	Mount Lemmon Survey	·	1.5 km	MPC · JPL
614064	2008 SK_{55}	—	September 20, 2008	Mount Lemmon	Mount Lemmon Survey	·	960 m	MPC · JPL
614065	2008 SP_{63}	—	September 21, 2008	Mount Lemmon	Mount Lemmon Survey	·	540 m	MPC · JPL
614066	2008 SZ_{71}	—	September 22, 2008	Mount Lemmon	Mount Lemmon Survey	·	880 m	MPC · JPL
614067	2008 SD_{86}	—	September 20, 2008	Kitt Peak	Spacewatch	L4	6.5 km	MPC · JPL
614068	2008 SK_{86}	—	September 20, 2008	Kitt Peak	Spacewatch	·	3.2 km	MPC · JPL
614069	2008 SV_{89}	—	September 21, 2008	Kitt Peak	Spacewatch	·	630 m	MPC · JPL
614070	2008 SN_{90}	—	September 21, 2008	Kitt Peak	Spacewatch	·	1.2 km	MPC · JPL
614071	2008 SX_{90}	—	September 21, 2008	Kitt Peak	Spacewatch	H	430 m	MPC · JPL
614072	2008 SH_{92}	—	September 21, 2008	Kitt Peak	Spacewatch	·	1.3 km	MPC · JPL
614073	2008 SY_{95}	—	September 21, 2008	Kitt Peak	Spacewatch	·	1.4 km	MPC · JPL
614074	2008 SP_{97}	—	September 21, 2008	Kitt Peak	Spacewatch	·	1.4 km	MPC · JPL
614075	2008 SZ_{99}	—	September 21, 2008	Kitt Peak	Spacewatch	·	580 m	MPC · JPL
614076	2008 SN_{102}	—	September 21, 2008	Kitt Peak	Spacewatch	EUN	1.1 km	MPC · JPL
614077	2008 SV_{102}	—	September 21, 2008	Mount Lemmon	Mount Lemmon Survey	T_{j} (2.96)	4.5 km	MPC · JPL
614078	2008 SP_{116}	—	September 22, 2008	Mount Lemmon	Mount Lemmon Survey	·	450 m	MPC · JPL
614079	2008 SE_{117}	—	September 22, 2008	Mount Lemmon	Mount Lemmon Survey	·	820 m	MPC · JPL
614080	2008 SH_{120}	—	September 22, 2008	Mount Lemmon	Mount Lemmon Survey	L4	6.6 km	MPC · JPL
614081	2008 SQ_{120}	—	September 22, 2008	Mount Lemmon	Mount Lemmon Survey	·	1.8 km	MPC · JPL
614082	2008 SW_{125}	—	September 22, 2008	Mount Lemmon	Mount Lemmon Survey	·	660 m	MPC · JPL
614083	2008 SV_{132}	—	September 22, 2008	Kitt Peak	Spacewatch	·	1.2 km	MPC · JPL
614084	2008 SM_{137}	—	September 23, 2008	Kitt Peak	Spacewatch	H	420 m	MPC · JPL
614085	2008 SV_{139}	—	September 24, 2008	Catalina	CSS	·	590 m	MPC · JPL
614086	2008 SA_{142}	—	September 24, 2008	Mount Lemmon	Mount Lemmon Survey	·	680 m	MPC · JPL
614087	2008 SS_{145}	—	September 21, 2008	Catalina	CSS	·	1.2 km	MPC · JPL
614088	2008 SW_{150}	—	September 29, 2008	Siding Spring	SSS	APO	470 m	MPC · JPL
614089	2008 SY_{160}	—	September 28, 2008	Socorro	LINEAR	MAS	670 m	MPC · JPL
614090	2008 SM_{161}	—	September 28, 2008	Socorro	LINEAR	·	4.4 km	MPC · JPL
614091	2008 SQ_{165}	—	September 28, 2008	Socorro	LINEAR	·	1.4 km	MPC · JPL
614092	2008 SU_{166}	—	September 28, 2008	Socorro	LINEAR	·	940 m	MPC · JPL
614093	2008 SZ_{170}	—	September 21, 2008	Mount Lemmon	Mount Lemmon Survey	·	1.1 km	MPC · JPL
614094	2008 SZ_{171}	—	September 21, 2008	Mount Lemmon	Mount Lemmon Survey	·	1.1 km	MPC · JPL
614095	2008 SU_{175}	—	September 23, 2008	Kitt Peak	Spacewatch	·	1.1 km	MPC · JPL
614096	2008 SA_{179}	—	September 24, 2008	Kitt Peak	Spacewatch	·	1.1 km	MPC · JPL
614097	2008 SR_{179}	—	September 24, 2008	Kitt Peak	Spacewatch	H	480 m	MPC · JPL
614098	2008 SY_{189}	—	September 25, 2008	Kitt Peak	Spacewatch	·	570 m	MPC · JPL
614099	2008 SR_{194}	—	September 25, 2008	Kitt Peak	Spacewatch	NYS	1.2 km	MPC · JPL
614100	2008 SQ_{199}	—	September 26, 2008	Kitt Peak	Spacewatch	·	1.8 km	MPC · JPL

== 614101–614200 ==
back to top

Designation			Discovery			Properties		Ref
Permanent	Provisional	Named after	Date	Site	Discoverer(s)	Category	Diam.	Ref
614101	2008 SJ_{201}	—	September 26, 2008	Kitt Peak	Spacewatch	NYS	970 m	MPC · JPL
614102	2008 SU_{206}	—	September 26, 2008	Kitt Peak	Spacewatch	T_{j} (2.97)	2.3 km	MPC · JPL
614103	2008 SE_{207}	—	September 26, 2008	Kitt Peak	Spacewatch	·	1.2 km	MPC · JPL
614104	2008 SH_{209}	—	September 28, 2008	Charleston	Astronomical Research Observatory	·	1.5 km	MPC · JPL
614105	2008 SQ_{211}	—	September 28, 2008	Mount Lemmon	Mount Lemmon Survey	·	670 m	MPC · JPL
614106	2008 SO_{214}	—	September 29, 2008	Mount Lemmon	Mount Lemmon Survey	·	1.2 km	MPC · JPL
614107	2008 SB_{215}	—	September 29, 2008	Mount Lemmon	Mount Lemmon Survey	·	1.6 km	MPC · JPL
614108	2008 SU_{237}	—	September 29, 2008	Catalina	CSS	·	2.3 km	MPC · JPL
614109	2008 SH_{238}	—	September 29, 2008	Kitt Peak	Spacewatch	·	1.6 km	MPC · JPL
614110	2008 SL_{243}	—	September 29, 2008	Kitt Peak	Spacewatch	MAS	720 m	MPC · JPL
614111	2008 SK_{244}	—	September 25, 2008	Mount Lemmon	Mount Lemmon Survey	·	1.3 km	MPC · JPL
614112	2008 SY_{252}	—	September 21, 2008	Kitt Peak	Spacewatch	·	660 m	MPC · JPL
614113	2008 SJ_{261}	—	September 23, 2008	Kitt Peak	Spacewatch	·	1.8 km	MPC · JPL
614114	2008 SG_{262}	—	September 24, 2008	Kitt Peak	Spacewatch	L4	6.1 km	MPC · JPL
614115	2008 SE_{271}	—	September 28, 2008	Mount Lemmon	Mount Lemmon Survey	EOS	1.7 km	MPC · JPL
614116	2008 SD_{272}	—	September 30, 2008	Catalina	CSS	·	960 m	MPC · JPL
614117	2008 SG_{272}	—	September 22, 2008	Mount Lemmon	Mount Lemmon Survey	·	440 m	MPC · JPL
614118	2008 SP_{275}	—	September 23, 2008	Kitt Peak	Spacewatch	L4	6.7 km	MPC · JPL
614119	2008 SU_{275}	—	September 23, 2008	Mount Lemmon	Mount Lemmon Survey	L4 · ERY	6.6 km	MPC · JPL
614120	2008 SV_{275}	—	September 23, 2008	Mount Lemmon	Mount Lemmon Survey	L4	6.8 km	MPC · JPL
614121	2008 SJ_{276}	—	September 23, 2008	Mount Lemmon	Mount Lemmon Survey	L4	6.7 km	MPC · JPL
614122	2008 SX_{276}	—	September 24, 2008	Mount Lemmon	Mount Lemmon Survey	L4	7.1 km	MPC · JPL
614123	2008 SK_{279}	—	September 19, 2008	Kitt Peak	Spacewatch	·	750 m	MPC · JPL
614124	2008 SM_{279}	—	September 19, 2008	Kitt Peak	Spacewatch	THM	1.7 km	MPC · JPL
614125	2008 SW_{280}	—	September 29, 2008	Mount Lemmon	Mount Lemmon Survey	·	1.1 km	MPC · JPL
614126	2008 SY_{280}	—	September 22, 2008	Mount Lemmon	Mount Lemmon Survey	·	850 m	MPC · JPL
614127	2008 SJ_{286}	—	September 22, 2008	Mount Lemmon	Mount Lemmon Survey	·	2.1 km	MPC · JPL
614128	2008 SP_{289}	—	September 26, 2008	Kitt Peak	Spacewatch	AGN	920 m	MPC · JPL
614129	2008 SW_{299}	—	September 22, 2008	Kitt Peak	Spacewatch	·	3.6 km	MPC · JPL
614130	2008 SQ_{303}	—	September 24, 2008	Mount Lemmon	Mount Lemmon Survey	·	900 m	MPC · JPL
614131	2008 SW_{303}	—	September 24, 2008	Kitt Peak	Spacewatch	·	1.9 km	MPC · JPL
614132	2008 TL_{1}	—	October 1, 2008	Socorro	LINEAR	·	1.9 km	MPC · JPL
614133	2008 TS_{2}	—	October 1, 2008	Mount Lemmon	Mount Lemmon Survey	·	2.2 km	MPC · JPL
614134	2008 TC_{4}	—	October 7, 2008	Socorro	LINEAR	ATE · PHA	170 m	MPC · JPL
614135	2008 TN_{4}	—	October 1, 2008	La Sagra	OAM	·	790 m	MPC · JPL
614136	2008 TP_{5}	—	October 1, 2008	La Sagra	OAM	·	980 m	MPC · JPL
614137	2008 TH_{10}	—	October 8, 2008	Tzec Maun	E. Schwab	·	1.1 km	MPC · JPL
614138	2008 TM_{17}	—	October 1, 2008	Mount Lemmon	Mount Lemmon Survey	·	850 m	MPC · JPL
614139	2008 TG_{18}	—	October 1, 2008	Mount Lemmon	Mount Lemmon Survey	·	1.2 km	MPC · JPL
614140	2008 TX_{18}	—	October 1, 2008	Mount Lemmon	Mount Lemmon Survey	HNS	860 m	MPC · JPL
614141	2008 TM_{21}	—	October 1, 2008	Mount Lemmon	Mount Lemmon Survey	·	780 m	MPC · JPL
614142	2008 TP_{22}	—	October 1, 2008	Kitt Peak	Spacewatch	·	1.5 km	MPC · JPL
614143	2008 TV_{27}	—	October 1, 2008	La Sagra	OAM	·	1.1 km	MPC · JPL
614144	2008 TU_{32}	—	October 1, 2008	Kitt Peak	Spacewatch	MAS	540 m	MPC · JPL
614145	2008 TP_{34}	—	October 1, 2008	Mount Lemmon	Mount Lemmon Survey	L4	9.2 km	MPC · JPL
614146	2008 TQ_{38}	—	October 1, 2008	Kitt Peak	Spacewatch	·	3.5 km	MPC · JPL
614147	2008 TZ_{38}	—	October 1, 2008	Kitt Peak	Spacewatch	NYS	960 m	MPC · JPL
614148	2008 TF_{39}	—	October 1, 2008	Kitt Peak	Spacewatch	NYS	790 m	MPC · JPL
614149	2008 TR_{41}	—	October 1, 2008	Mount Lemmon	Mount Lemmon Survey	·	1.8 km	MPC · JPL
614150	2008 TU_{62}	—	October 2, 2008	Kitt Peak	Spacewatch	·	920 m	MPC · JPL
614151	2008 TT_{72}	—	October 2, 2008	Kitt Peak	Spacewatch	·	1.1 km	MPC · JPL
614152	2008 TC_{74}	—	October 2, 2008	Kitt Peak	Spacewatch	MAS	560 m	MPC · JPL
614153	2008 TM_{76}	—	October 2, 2008	Mount Lemmon	Mount Lemmon Survey	·	500 m	MPC · JPL
614154	2008 TY_{79}	—	October 2, 2008	Mount Lemmon	Mount Lemmon Survey	·	2.3 km	MPC · JPL
614155	2008 TM_{83}	—	October 3, 2008	Kitt Peak	Spacewatch	·	650 m	MPC · JPL
614156	2008 TP_{89}	—	October 3, 2008	Kitt Peak	Spacewatch	TIR	2.0 km	MPC · JPL
614157	2008 TM_{101}	—	October 6, 2008	Kitt Peak	Spacewatch	·	710 m	MPC · JPL
614158	2008 TX_{116}	—	October 6, 2008	Kitt Peak	Spacewatch	BAR	830 m	MPC · JPL
614159	2008 TR_{127}	—	October 8, 2008	Catalina	CSS	MAS	650 m	MPC · JPL
614160	2008 TE_{128}	—	October 8, 2008	Mount Lemmon	Mount Lemmon Survey	·	510 m	MPC · JPL
614161	2008 TM_{134}	—	October 8, 2008	Kitt Peak	Spacewatch	TEL	920 m	MPC · JPL
614162	2008 TK_{135}	—	October 8, 2008	Kitt Peak	Spacewatch	·	970 m	MPC · JPL
614163	2008 TP_{136}	—	October 8, 2008	Kitt Peak	Spacewatch	·	3.1 km	MPC · JPL
614164	2008 TR_{136}	—	October 8, 2008	Kitt Peak	Spacewatch	MAS	520 m	MPC · JPL
614165	2008 TY_{136}	—	October 8, 2008	Kitt Peak	Spacewatch	·	930 m	MPC · JPL
614166	2008 TR_{138}	—	October 8, 2008	Mount Lemmon	Mount Lemmon Survey	·	620 m	MPC · JPL
614167	2008 TU_{154}	—	October 9, 2008	Mount Lemmon	Mount Lemmon Survey	·	3.3 km	MPC · JPL
614168	2008 TB_{161}	—	October 6, 2008	Catalina	CSS	·	880 m	MPC · JPL
614169	2008 TY_{163}	—	October 1, 2008	Kitt Peak	Spacewatch	·	660 m	MPC · JPL
614170	2008 TZ_{165}	—	October 6, 2008	Catalina	CSS	H	540 m	MPC · JPL
614171	2008 TF_{166}	—	October 6, 2008	Mount Lemmon	Mount Lemmon Survey	·	1.8 km	MPC · JPL
614172	2008 TP_{167}	—	October 9, 2008	Kitt Peak	Spacewatch	·	580 m	MPC · JPL
614173	2008 TL_{172}	—	October 3, 2008	Mount Lemmon	Mount Lemmon Survey	NYS	860 m	MPC · JPL
614174	2008 TX_{173}	—	October 2, 2008	Kitt Peak	Spacewatch	·	700 m	MPC · JPL
614175	2008 TX_{174}	—	October 8, 2008	Kitt Peak	Spacewatch	·	980 m	MPC · JPL
614176	2008 TC_{187}	—	October 8, 2008	Kitt Peak	Spacewatch	·	680 m	MPC · JPL
614177	2008 UA_{9}	—	October 17, 2008	Kitt Peak	Spacewatch	NYS	670 m	MPC · JPL
614178	2008 UM_{13}	—	October 17, 2008	Kitt Peak	Spacewatch	·	2.1 km	MPC · JPL
614179	2008 US_{13}	—	October 17, 2008	Kitt Peak	Spacewatch	SUL	1.7 km	MPC · JPL
614180	2008 UB_{19}	—	October 19, 2008	Kitt Peak	Spacewatch	·	1.2 km	MPC · JPL
614181	2008 UX_{20}	—	October 19, 2008	Kitt Peak	Spacewatch	·	360 m	MPC · JPL
614182	2008 UZ_{23}	—	October 20, 2008	Kitt Peak	Spacewatch	KON	1.4 km	MPC · JPL
614183	2008 UV_{28}	—	October 20, 2008	Kitt Peak	Spacewatch	·	690 m	MPC · JPL
614184	2008 UY_{29}	—	October 20, 2008	Kitt Peak	Spacewatch	·	1.0 km	MPC · JPL
614185	2008 UF_{30}	—	October 20, 2008	Kitt Peak	Spacewatch	MAS	580 m	MPC · JPL
614186	2008 US_{30}	—	October 20, 2008	Kitt Peak	Spacewatch	·	1.6 km	MPC · JPL
614187	2008 UN_{31}	—	October 20, 2008	Kitt Peak	Spacewatch	·	3.0 km	MPC · JPL
614188	2008 UO_{34}	—	October 20, 2008	Kitt Peak	Spacewatch	·	2.4 km	MPC · JPL
614189	2008 US_{34}	—	October 20, 2008	Kitt Peak	Spacewatch	·	2.1 km	MPC · JPL
614190	2008 UF_{37}	—	October 20, 2008	Kitt Peak	Spacewatch	·	1.0 km	MPC · JPL
614191	2008 UN_{37}	—	October 20, 2008	Kitt Peak	Spacewatch	·	560 m	MPC · JPL
614192	2008 UM_{39}	—	October 20, 2008	Mount Lemmon	Mount Lemmon Survey	·	1.6 km	MPC · JPL
614193	2008 UH_{40}	—	October 20, 2008	Kitt Peak	Spacewatch	(1547)	1.4 km	MPC · JPL
614194	2008 UP_{41}	—	October 20, 2008	Kitt Peak	Spacewatch	MAS	550 m	MPC · JPL
614195	2008 UY_{42}	—	October 20, 2008	Kitt Peak	Spacewatch	·	3.5 km	MPC · JPL
614196	2008 UP_{45}	—	October 20, 2008	Mount Lemmon	Mount Lemmon Survey	NYS	840 m	MPC · JPL
614197	2008 UQ_{45}	—	October 20, 2008	Mount Lemmon	Mount Lemmon Survey	·	3.0 km	MPC · JPL
614198	2008 UW_{48}	—	October 20, 2008	Kitt Peak	Spacewatch	THB	2.3 km	MPC · JPL
614199	2008 UY_{48}	—	October 20, 2008	Kitt Peak	Spacewatch	·	3.2 km	MPC · JPL
614200	2008 UM_{62}	—	October 21, 2008	Kitt Peak	Spacewatch	·	1.3 km	MPC · JPL

== 614201–614300 ==
back to top

Designation			Discovery			Properties		Ref
Permanent	Provisional	Named after	Date	Site	Discoverer(s)	Category	Diam.	Ref
614201	2008 UF_{66}	—	October 21, 2008	Kitt Peak	Spacewatch	·	3.7 km	MPC · JPL
614202	2008 UK_{80}	—	October 22, 2008	Kitt Peak	Spacewatch	(21885)	4.1 km	MPC · JPL
614203	2008 UL_{80}	—	October 22, 2008	Kitt Peak	Spacewatch	·	2.5 km	MPC · JPL
614204	2008 UQ_{82}	—	October 22, 2008	Kitt Peak	Spacewatch	·	1.1 km	MPC · JPL
614205	2008 UM_{106}	—	October 21, 2008	Kitt Peak	Spacewatch	·	1.7 km	MPC · JPL
614206	2008 UG_{115}	—	October 22, 2008	Kitt Peak	Spacewatch	·	870 m	MPC · JPL
614207	2008 UZ_{119}	—	October 22, 2008	Kitt Peak	Spacewatch	·	2.8 km	MPC · JPL
614208	2008 US_{121}	—	October 22, 2008	Kitt Peak	Spacewatch	·	3.7 km	MPC · JPL
614209	2008 UX_{121}	—	October 22, 2008	Kitt Peak	Spacewatch	·	4.0 km	MPC · JPL
614210	2008 UF_{125}	—	October 22, 2008	Kitt Peak	Spacewatch	·	1.3 km	MPC · JPL
614211	2008 UD_{135}	—	October 23, 2008	Kitt Peak	Spacewatch	NYS	900 m	MPC · JPL
614212	2008 UF_{135}	—	October 23, 2008	Kitt Peak	Spacewatch	·	1.4 km	MPC · JPL
614213	2008 UE_{136}	—	October 23, 2008	Kitt Peak	Spacewatch	·	1.3 km	MPC · JPL
614214	2008 UZ_{140}	—	October 23, 2008	Kitt Peak	Spacewatch	H	310 m	MPC · JPL
614215	2008 UL_{142}	—	October 23, 2008	Kitt Peak	Spacewatch	JUN	600 m	MPC · JPL
614216	2008 UM_{146}	—	October 23, 2008	Kitt Peak	Spacewatch	NYS	910 m	MPC · JPL
614217	2008 UR_{161}	—	October 24, 2008	Kitt Peak	Spacewatch	EOS	1.3 km	MPC · JPL
614218	2008 UH_{170}	—	October 24, 2008	Catalina	CSS	·	660 m	MPC · JPL
614219	2008 UD_{171}	—	October 24, 2008	Kitt Peak	Spacewatch	·	1.5 km	MPC · JPL
614220	2008 UJ_{171}	—	October 24, 2008	Kitt Peak	Spacewatch	NYS	950 m	MPC · JPL
614221	2008 UQ_{174}	—	October 24, 2008	Kitt Peak	Spacewatch	·	3.8 km	MPC · JPL
614222	2008 UB_{179}	—	October 24, 2008	Catalina	CSS	·	1.0 km	MPC · JPL
614223	2008 UQ_{190}	—	October 25, 2008	Kitt Peak	Spacewatch	·	1.2 km	MPC · JPL
614224	2008 UE_{194}	—	October 26, 2008	Kitt Peak	Spacewatch	·	2.5 km	MPC · JPL
614225	2008 UF_{205}	—	October 27, 2008	Catalina	CSS	·	2.7 km	MPC · JPL
614226	2008 UZ_{208}	—	October 23, 2008	Kitt Peak	Spacewatch	·	550 m	MPC · JPL
614227	2008 UM_{222}	—	October 25, 2008	Kitt Peak	Spacewatch	·	1.1 km	MPC · JPL
614228	2008 UQ_{223}	—	October 25, 2008	Mount Lemmon	Mount Lemmon Survey	·	1.8 km	MPC · JPL
614229	2008 UQ_{228}	—	October 25, 2008	Kitt Peak	Spacewatch	NYS	880 m	MPC · JPL
614230	2008 UB_{232}	—	October 26, 2008	Mount Lemmon	Mount Lemmon Survey	·	2.7 km	MPC · JPL
614231	2008 UD_{232}	—	October 26, 2008	Mount Lemmon	Mount Lemmon Survey	·	1.1 km	MPC · JPL
614232	2008 UA_{251}	—	October 27, 2008	Kitt Peak	Spacewatch	MAS	530 m	MPC · JPL
614233	2008 UB_{261}	—	October 27, 2008	Mount Lemmon	Mount Lemmon Survey	H	410 m	MPC · JPL
614234	2008 UC_{263}	—	October 27, 2008	Kitt Peak	Spacewatch	·	990 m	MPC · JPL
614235	2008 UX_{264}	—	October 28, 2008	Kitt Peak	Spacewatch	·	1.1 km	MPC · JPL
614236	2008 UP_{267}	—	October 28, 2008	Kitt Peak	Spacewatch	·	1.3 km	MPC · JPL
614237	2008 UO_{279}	—	October 28, 2008	Mount Lemmon	Mount Lemmon Survey	MAS	470 m	MPC · JPL
614238	2008 UA_{282}	—	October 28, 2008	Kitt Peak	Spacewatch	·	1.0 km	MPC · JPL
614239	2008 UW_{282}	—	October 28, 2008	Mount Lemmon	Mount Lemmon Survey	·	2.3 km	MPC · JPL
614240	2008 UW_{287}	—	October 28, 2008	Mount Lemmon	Mount Lemmon Survey	MAS	580 m	MPC · JPL
614241	2008 UT_{295}	—	October 29, 2008	Kitt Peak	Spacewatch	NYS	1.0 km	MPC · JPL
614242	2008 UR_{297}	—	October 29, 2008	Kitt Peak	Spacewatch	EUP	3.8 km	MPC · JPL
614243	2008 UJ_{298}	—	October 29, 2008	Kitt Peak	Spacewatch	·	1.3 km	MPC · JPL
614244	2008 UJ_{302}	—	October 29, 2008	Kitt Peak	Spacewatch	·	1.2 km	MPC · JPL
614245	2008 UM_{304}	—	October 29, 2008	Kitt Peak	Spacewatch	·	3.1 km	MPC · JPL
614246	2008 UA_{305}	—	October 29, 2008	Mount Lemmon	Mount Lemmon Survey	·	460 m	MPC · JPL
614247	2008 UM_{305}	—	October 30, 2008	Kitt Peak	Spacewatch	·	800 m	MPC · JPL
614248	2008 UN_{311}	—	October 30, 2008	Kitt Peak	Spacewatch	·	2.4 km	MPC · JPL
614249	2008 UY_{312}	—	October 30, 2008	Kitt Peak	Spacewatch	·	730 m	MPC · JPL
614250	2008 UE_{314}	—	October 30, 2008	Kitt Peak	Spacewatch	AEO	910 m	MPC · JPL
614251	2008 UL_{329}	—	October 31, 2008	Kitt Peak	Spacewatch	·	1.2 km	MPC · JPL
614252	2008 UN_{335}	—	October 20, 2008	Kitt Peak	Spacewatch	CLA	1.2 km	MPC · JPL
614253	2008 UY_{335}	—	October 20, 2008	Kitt Peak	Spacewatch	·	430 m	MPC · JPL
614254	2008 UD_{336}	—	October 20, 2008	Kitt Peak	Spacewatch	·	560 m	MPC · JPL
614255	2008 UY_{338}	—	October 22, 2008	Kitt Peak	Spacewatch	·	930 m	MPC · JPL
614256	2008 UB_{344}	—	October 25, 2008	Mount Lemmon	Mount Lemmon Survey	·	2.4 km	MPC · JPL
614257	2008 UM_{347}	—	October 21, 2008	Kitt Peak	Spacewatch	·	1.1 km	MPC · JPL
614258	2008 UW_{348}	—	October 26, 2008	Mount Lemmon	Mount Lemmon Survey	·	2.2 km	MPC · JPL
614259	2008 UC_{351}	—	October 27, 2008	Kitt Peak	Spacewatch	·	1.4 km	MPC · JPL
614260	2008 UG_{351}	—	October 27, 2008	Mount Lemmon	Mount Lemmon Survey	·	3.0 km	MPC · JPL
614261	2008 UT_{356}	—	October 23, 2008	Mount Lemmon	Mount Lemmon Survey	·	690 m	MPC · JPL
614262	2008 UE_{357}	—	October 24, 2008	Catalina	CSS	EUP	4.1 km	MPC · JPL
614263	2008 UM_{364}	—	October 28, 2008	Catalina	CSS	·	2.8 km	MPC · JPL
614264	2008 UJ_{368}	—	October 23, 2008	Mount Lemmon	Mount Lemmon Survey	·	650 m	MPC · JPL
614265	2008 UH_{370}	—	October 28, 2008	Kitt Peak	Spacewatch	(11097)	1.6 km	MPC · JPL
614266	2008 VN	—	November 1, 2008	Socorro	LINEAR	T_{j} (2.85) · AMO +1km	1.5 km	MPC · JPL
614267	2008 VP_{21}	—	November 1, 2008	Mount Lemmon	Mount Lemmon Survey	·	2.2 km	MPC · JPL
614268	2008 VO_{22}	—	November 1, 2008	Mount Lemmon	Mount Lemmon Survey	NYS	820 m	MPC · JPL
614269	2008 VC_{23}	—	November 1, 2008	Kitt Peak	Spacewatch	·	2.7 km	MPC · JPL
614270	2008 VT_{49}	—	November 4, 2008	Kitt Peak	Spacewatch	·	830 m	MPC · JPL
614271	2008 VN_{57}	—	November 6, 2008	Mount Lemmon	Mount Lemmon Survey	·	2.5 km	MPC · JPL
614272	2008 VD_{61}	—	November 8, 2008	Mount Lemmon	Mount Lemmon Survey	THM	1.9 km	MPC · JPL
614273	2008 VC_{67}	—	November 7, 2008	Mount Lemmon	Mount Lemmon Survey	·	2.9 km	MPC · JPL
614274	2008 WQ_{5}	—	November 17, 2008	Kitt Peak	Spacewatch	NYS	1.0 km	MPC · JPL
614275	2008 WL_{9}	—	November 17, 2008	Kitt Peak	Spacewatch	·	760 m	MPC · JPL
614276	2008 WY_{10}	—	November 18, 2008	Catalina	CSS	·	1.3 km	MPC · JPL
614277	2008 WS_{16}	—	November 17, 2008	Kitt Peak	Spacewatch	·	2.4 km	MPC · JPL
614278	2008 WZ_{18}	—	November 17, 2008	Kitt Peak	Spacewatch	·	2.2 km	MPC · JPL
614279	2008 WC_{22}	—	November 18, 2008	Kitt Peak	Spacewatch	·	880 m	MPC · JPL
614280	2008 WM_{28}	—	November 19, 2008	Mount Lemmon	Mount Lemmon Survey	THM	1.6 km	MPC · JPL
614281	2008 WP_{29}	—	November 19, 2008	Kitt Peak	Spacewatch	·	4.6 km	MPC · JPL
614282	2008 WD_{30}	—	November 19, 2008	Mount Lemmon	Mount Lemmon Survey	·	560 m	MPC · JPL
614283	2008 WS_{31}	—	November 19, 2008	Mount Lemmon	Mount Lemmon Survey	·	940 m	MPC · JPL
614284	2008 WZ_{40}	—	November 17, 2008	Kitt Peak	Spacewatch	·	1.1 km	MPC · JPL
614285	2008 WG_{65}	—	November 17, 2008	Kitt Peak	Spacewatch	·	930 m	MPC · JPL
614286	2008 WP_{68}	—	November 18, 2008	Kitt Peak	Spacewatch	·	1.1 km	MPC · JPL
614287	2008 WL_{72}	—	November 19, 2008	Mount Lemmon	Mount Lemmon Survey	·	1.4 km	MPC · JPL
614288	2008 WL_{80}	—	November 20, 2008	Kitt Peak	Spacewatch	·	1.2 km	MPC · JPL
614289	2008 WV_{83}	—	November 20, 2008	Kitt Peak	Spacewatch	·	960 m	MPC · JPL
614290	2008 WH_{87}	—	November 21, 2008	Mount Lemmon	Mount Lemmon Survey	·	500 m	MPC · JPL
614291	2008 WC_{96}	—	November 28, 2008	Sierra Stars	Dillon, W. G., Wells, D.	·	750 m	MPC · JPL
614292	2008 WH_{97}	—	November 18, 2008	Catalina	CSS	·	5.8 km	MPC · JPL
614293	2008 WO_{97}	—	November 19, 2008	Catalina	CSS	·	1.4 km	MPC · JPL
614294	2008 WK_{124}	—	November 23, 2008	La Sagra	OAM	NYS	1.1 km	MPC · JPL
614295	2008 WS_{127}	—	November 19, 2008	Kitt Peak	Spacewatch	·	1.1 km	MPC · JPL
614296	2008 WX_{132}	—	November 26, 2008	La Sagra	OAM	·	810 m	MPC · JPL
614297	2008 XP_{3}	—	December 2, 2008	Socorro	LINEAR	EUP	4.5 km	MPC · JPL
614298	2008 XA_{5}	—	December 4, 2008	Socorro	LINEAR	PHO	950 m	MPC · JPL
614299	2008 XR_{26}	—	December 4, 2008	Mount Lemmon	Mount Lemmon Survey	·	2.5 km	MPC · JPL
614300	2008 XC_{32}	—	December 2, 2008	Kitt Peak	Spacewatch	·	2.5 km	MPC · JPL

== 614301–614400 ==
back to top

Designation			Discovery			Properties		Ref
Permanent	Provisional	Named after	Date	Site	Discoverer(s)	Category	Diam.	Ref
614301	2008 XD_{36}	—	December 2, 2008	Kitt Peak	Spacewatch	·	1.1 km	MPC · JPL
614302	2008 XP_{36}	—	December 2, 2008	Kitt Peak	Spacewatch	·	1.2 km	MPC · JPL
614303	2008 XH_{44}	—	December 3, 2008	Kitt Peak	Spacewatch	EUP	4.8 km	MPC · JPL
614304	2008 XT_{48}	—	December 4, 2008	Mount Lemmon	Mount Lemmon Survey	TIR	3.2 km	MPC · JPL
614305	2008 XZ_{48}	—	December 4, 2008	Kitt Peak	Spacewatch	EUN	1.2 km	MPC · JPL
614306	2008 YS	—	December 19, 2008	Calar Alto	F. Hormuth	·	3.2 km	MPC · JPL
614307	2008 YT_{3}	—	December 21, 2008	Calar Alto	F. Hormuth	EOS	1.6 km	MPC · JPL
614308	2008 YS_{9}	—	December 23, 2008	Piszkéstető	K. Sárneczky	·	1.1 km	MPC · JPL
614309	2008 YN_{10}	—	December 20, 2008	Mount Lemmon	Mount Lemmon Survey	·	2.2 km	MPC · JPL
614310	2008 YZ_{11}	—	December 21, 2008	Mount Lemmon	Mount Lemmon Survey	·	2.1 km	MPC · JPL
614311	2008 YQ_{14}	—	December 21, 2008	Kitt Peak	Spacewatch	(5)	1.1 km	MPC · JPL
614312	2008 YE_{25}	—	December 21, 2008	Kitt Peak	Spacewatch	·	680 m	MPC · JPL
614313	2008 YR_{27}	—	December 29, 2008	Mount Lemmon	Mount Lemmon Survey	APO +1km	780 m	MPC · JPL
614314	2008 YB_{30}	—	December 30, 2008	Catalina	CSS	T_{j} (2.88)	3.0 km	MPC · JPL
614315	2008 YX_{31}	—	December 30, 2008	Magdalena Ridge	Ryan, W. H.	·	680 m	MPC · JPL
614316	2008 YZ_{32}	—	December 31, 2008	Catalina	CSS	APO · fast	380 m	MPC · JPL
614317	2008 YR_{35}	—	December 22, 2008	Kitt Peak	Spacewatch	THM	1.6 km	MPC · JPL
614318	2008 YG_{82}	—	December 31, 2008	Kitt Peak	Spacewatch	·	980 m	MPC · JPL
614319	2008 YF_{91}	—	December 29, 2008	Kitt Peak	Spacewatch	·	570 m	MPC · JPL
614320	2008 YO_{92}	—	December 29, 2008	Kitt Peak	Spacewatch	·	1.0 km	MPC · JPL
614321	2008 YS_{92}	—	December 29, 2008	Kitt Peak	Spacewatch	DOR	2.3 km	MPC · JPL
614322	2008 YZ_{97}	—	December 29, 2008	Mount Lemmon	Mount Lemmon Survey	·	2.9 km	MPC · JPL
614323	2008 YE_{99}	—	December 29, 2008	Kitt Peak	Spacewatch	·	1.5 km	MPC · JPL
614324	2008 YV_{99}	—	December 29, 2008	Kitt Peak	Spacewatch	·	1.5 km	MPC · JPL
614325	2008 YE_{104}	—	December 29, 2008	Kitt Peak	Spacewatch	EUN	1.1 km	MPC · JPL
614326	2008 YE_{107}	—	December 29, 2008	Kitt Peak	Spacewatch	MAS	540 m	MPC · JPL
614327	2008 YS_{107}	—	December 29, 2008	Kitt Peak	Spacewatch	EUP	4.1 km	MPC · JPL
614328	2008 YL_{141}	—	December 30, 2008	Kitt Peak	Spacewatch	·	2.4 km	MPC · JPL
614329	2008 YV_{149}	—	December 21, 2008	Kitt Peak	Spacewatch	·	730 m	MPC · JPL
614330	2008 YC_{150}	—	December 21, 2008	Mount Lemmon	Mount Lemmon Survey	·	970 m	MPC · JPL
614331	2008 YP_{159}	—	December 21, 2008	Kitt Peak	Spacewatch	·	1.3 km	MPC · JPL
614332	2008 YB_{160}	—	December 30, 2008	Mount Lemmon	Mount Lemmon Survey	·	980 m	MPC · JPL
614333	2008 YU_{162}	—	December 22, 2008	Kitt Peak	Spacewatch	·	1.9 km	MPC · JPL
614334	2008 YA_{163}	—	December 29, 2008	Kitt Peak	Spacewatch	·	1.1 km	MPC · JPL
614335	2008 YP_{165}	—	December 29, 2008	Kitt Peak	Spacewatch	MAS	440 m	MPC · JPL
614336	2008 YM_{171}	—	December 31, 2008	Socorro	LINEAR	·	3.3 km	MPC · JPL
614337	2008 YX_{171}	—	December 29, 2008	Mount Lemmon	Mount Lemmon Survey	·	1.6 km	MPC · JPL
614338	2009 AZ_{2}	—	January 1, 2009	Kitt Peak	Spacewatch	DOR	2.0 km	MPC · JPL
614339	2009 AD_{5}	—	January 1, 2009	Kitt Peak	Spacewatch	THM	1.8 km	MPC · JPL
614340	2009 AG_{8}	—	January 1, 2009	Kitt Peak	Spacewatch	MAS	450 m	MPC · JPL
614341	2009 AE_{14}	—	January 2, 2009	Mount Lemmon	Mount Lemmon Survey	·	2.4 km	MPC · JPL
614342	2009 AS_{20}	—	January 2, 2009	Mount Lemmon	Mount Lemmon Survey	THB	3.0 km	MPC · JPL
614343	2009 AY_{21}	—	January 3, 2009	Kitt Peak	Spacewatch	·	990 m	MPC · JPL
614344	2009 AA_{38}	—	January 15, 2009	Kitt Peak	Spacewatch	·	1.2 km	MPC · JPL
614345	2009 AS_{43}	—	January 2, 2009	Mount Lemmon	Mount Lemmon Survey	·	2.5 km	MPC · JPL
614346	2009 BL_{19}	—	January 16, 2009	Mount Lemmon	Mount Lemmon Survey	·	1.4 km	MPC · JPL
614347	2009 BR_{23}	—	January 17, 2009	Kitt Peak	Spacewatch	·	2.8 km	MPC · JPL
614348	2009 BY_{25}	—	January 16, 2009	Kitt Peak	Spacewatch	·	920 m	MPC · JPL
614349	2009 BY_{27}	—	January 16, 2009	Kitt Peak	Spacewatch	·	900 m	MPC · JPL
614350	2009 BJ_{33}	—	January 16, 2009	Kitt Peak	Spacewatch	THM	2.1 km	MPC · JPL
614351	2009 BP_{34}	—	January 16, 2009	Kitt Peak	Spacewatch	(5)	790 m	MPC · JPL
614352	2009 BL_{42}	—	January 16, 2009	Kitt Peak	Spacewatch	EUN	760 m	MPC · JPL
614353	2009 BJ_{44}	—	January 16, 2009	Kitt Peak	Spacewatch	·	2.9 km	MPC · JPL
614354	2009 BY_{49}	—	January 16, 2009	Mount Lemmon	Mount Lemmon Survey	·	980 m	MPC · JPL
614355	2009 BE_{54}	—	January 16, 2009	Mount Lemmon	Mount Lemmon Survey	·	1.1 km	MPC · JPL
614356	2009 BE_{61}	—	January 18, 2009	Catalina	CSS	(5)	1.0 km	MPC · JPL
614357	2009 BW_{66}	—	January 20, 2009	Kitt Peak	Spacewatch	·	2.8 km	MPC · JPL
614358	2009 BS_{77}	—	January 25, 2009	Socorro	LINEAR	·	1.0 km	MPC · JPL
614359	2009 BW_{86}	—	January 25, 2009	Kitt Peak	Spacewatch	·	960 m	MPC · JPL
614360	2009 BP_{91}	—	January 25, 2009	Kitt Peak	Spacewatch	·	2.3 km	MPC · JPL
614361	2009 BF_{92}	—	January 25, 2009	Kitt Peak	Spacewatch	·	1.9 km	MPC · JPL
614362	2009 BK_{95}	—	January 26, 2009	Mount Lemmon	Mount Lemmon Survey	·	2.4 km	MPC · JPL
614363	2009 BP_{101}	—	January 29, 2009	Mount Lemmon	Mount Lemmon Survey	·	2.3 km	MPC · JPL
614364	2009 BV_{104}	—	January 25, 2009	Kitt Peak	Spacewatch	·	2.7 km	MPC · JPL
614365	2009 BQ_{111}	—	January 29, 2009	Kitt Peak	Spacewatch	·	900 m	MPC · JPL
614366	2009 BA_{112}	—	January 29, 2009	Kitt Peak	Spacewatch	·	790 m	MPC · JPL
614367	2009 BP_{119}	—	January 30, 2009	Kitt Peak	Spacewatch	·	3.0 km	MPC · JPL
614368	2009 BR_{126}	—	January 29, 2009	Kitt Peak	Spacewatch	·	890 m	MPC · JPL
614369	2009 BH_{160}	—	January 31, 2009	Mount Lemmon	Mount Lemmon Survey	·	620 m	MPC · JPL
614370	2009 BE_{178}	—	January 31, 2009	Kitt Peak	Spacewatch	THM	2.0 km	MPC · JPL
614371	2009 BW_{180}	—	January 31, 2009	Kitt Peak	Spacewatch	·	1.8 km	MPC · JPL
614372	2009 BM_{183}	—	January 25, 2009	Kitt Peak	Spacewatch	·	1.1 km	MPC · JPL
614373	2009 BF_{188}	—	January 26, 2009	Socorro	LINEAR	EUN	1.2 km	MPC · JPL
614374	2009 CR_{2}	—	February 3, 2009	Catalina	CSS	T_{j} (2.71) · APO +1km	1.6 km	MPC · JPL
614375	2009 CP_{21}	—	February 1, 2009	Kitt Peak	Spacewatch	·	2.8 km	MPC · JPL
614376	2009 CA_{26}	—	February 1, 2009	Kitt Peak	Spacewatch	PHO	740 m	MPC · JPL
614377	2009 CA_{28}	—	February 1, 2009	Kitt Peak	Spacewatch	·	2.5 km	MPC · JPL
614378	2009 CS_{33}	—	February 2, 2009	Kitt Peak	Spacewatch	·	860 m	MPC · JPL
614379	2009 CW_{35}	—	February 2, 2009	Mount Lemmon	Mount Lemmon Survey	·	710 m	MPC · JPL
614380	2009 CE_{36}	—	February 2, 2009	Mount Lemmon	Mount Lemmon Survey	LIX	2.9 km	MPC · JPL
614381	2009 CK_{41}	—	February 13, 2009	Kitt Peak	Spacewatch	MAS	540 m	MPC · JPL
614382	2009 CR_{41}	—	February 13, 2009	Kitt Peak	Spacewatch	·	1.5 km	MPC · JPL
614383	2009 CL_{48}	—	February 14, 2009	Kitt Peak	Spacewatch	·	1.8 km	MPC · JPL
614384	2009 CD_{52}	—	February 14, 2009	Mount Lemmon	Mount Lemmon Survey	·	1.9 km	MPC · JPL
614385	2009 CG_{57}	—	February 1, 2009	Kitt Peak	Spacewatch	·	2.2 km	MPC · JPL
614386	2009 CE_{59}	—	February 5, 2009	Kitt Peak	Spacewatch	·	2.3 km	MPC · JPL
614387	2009 DX_{19}	—	February 21, 2009	Catalina	CSS	·	2.1 km	MPC · JPL
614388	2009 DR_{25}	—	February 21, 2009	Mount Lemmon	Mount Lemmon Survey	THM	1.8 km	MPC · JPL
614389	2009 DQ_{27}	—	February 22, 2009	Calar Alto	F. Hormuth	·	550 m	MPC · JPL
614390	2009 DV_{30}	—	February 23, 2009	Calar Alto	F. Hormuth	THM	1.7 km	MPC · JPL
614391	2009 DB_{35}	—	February 20, 2009	Kitt Peak	Spacewatch	·	2.8 km	MPC · JPL
614392	2009 DT_{50}	—	February 19, 2009	Kitt Peak	Spacewatch	·	2.3 km	MPC · JPL
614393	2009 DE_{53}	—	February 22, 2009	Kitt Peak	Spacewatch	·	740 m	MPC · JPL
614394	2009 DF_{53}	—	February 22, 2009	Kitt Peak	Spacewatch	·	890 m	MPC · JPL
614395	2009 DH_{66}	—	February 24, 2009	Mount Lemmon	Mount Lemmon Survey	·	1.6 km	MPC · JPL
614396	2009 DK_{68}	—	February 21, 2009	Mount Lemmon	Mount Lemmon Survey	·	940 m	MPC · JPL
614397	2009 DN_{73}	—	February 26, 2009	Mount Lemmon	Mount Lemmon Survey	·	2.4 km	MPC · JPL
614398	2009 DJ_{85}	—	February 27, 2009	Kitt Peak	Spacewatch	(5)	730 m	MPC · JPL
614399	2009 DY_{102}	—	February 26, 2009	Kitt Peak	Spacewatch	·	1.6 km	MPC · JPL
614400	2009 DS_{105}	—	February 26, 2009	Kitt Peak	Spacewatch	·	690 m	MPC · JPL

== 614401–614500 ==
back to top

Designation			Discovery			Properties		Ref
Permanent	Provisional	Named after	Date	Site	Discoverer(s)	Category	Diam.	Ref
614401	2009 DD_{110}	—	February 19, 2009	Catalina	CSS	·	4.7 km	MPC · JPL
614402	2009 DL_{114}	—	February 25, 2009	Calar Alto	F. Hormuth	·	860 m	MPC · JPL
614403	2009 DF_{115}	—	February 26, 2009	Catalina	CSS	MAS	620 m	MPC · JPL
614404	2009 DF_{124}	—	February 19, 2009	Kitt Peak	Spacewatch	·	3.1 km	MPC · JPL
614405	2009 EL_{9}	—	March 1, 2009	Kitt Peak	Spacewatch	·	760 m	MPC · JPL
614406	2009 FV_{4}	—	March 19, 2009	Mount Lemmon	Mount Lemmon Survey	APO	660 m	MPC · JPL
614407	2009 FY_{12}	—	March 18, 2009	Mount Lemmon	Mount Lemmon Survey	·	480 m	MPC · JPL
614408	2009 FZ_{12}	—	March 18, 2009	Mount Lemmon	Mount Lemmon Survey	·	1.1 km	MPC · JPL
614409	2009 FP_{44}	—	March 19, 2009	Mount Lemmon	Mount Lemmon Survey	·	1.7 km	MPC · JPL
614410	2009 FK_{45}	—	March 29, 2009	Kitt Peak	Spacewatch	·	610 m	MPC · JPL
614411	2009 FT_{50}	—	March 28, 2009	Kitt Peak	Spacewatch	·	1.5 km	MPC · JPL
614412	2009 FA_{56}	—	March 19, 2009	Catalina	CSS	PHO	1.1 km	MPC · JPL
614413	2009 FP_{56}	—	March 23, 2009	Mount Lemmon	Mount Lemmon Survey	T_{j} (2.83)	2.5 km	MPC · JPL
614414	2009 FB_{65}	—	March 17, 2009	Kitt Peak	Spacewatch	·	810 m	MPC · JPL
614415	2009 FF_{68}	—	March 29, 2009	Kitt Peak	Spacewatch	·	1.7 km	MPC · JPL
614416	2009 FU_{70}	—	March 22, 2009	Catalina	CSS	·	2.9 km	MPC · JPL
614417	2009 HB	—	April 16, 2009	Catalina	CSS	AMO · APO +1km	900 m	MPC · JPL
614418	2009 HE_{2}	—	April 17, 2009	Catalina	CSS	·	1.1 km	MPC · JPL
614419	2009 HO_{3}	—	April 17, 2009	Kitt Peak	Spacewatch	·	1.1 km	MPC · JPL
614420	2009 HZ_{5}	—	April 17, 2009	Kitt Peak	Spacewatch	·	2.6 km	MPC · JPL
614421	2009 HS_{51}	—	April 20, 2009	Mount Lemmon	Mount Lemmon Survey	H	520 m	MPC · JPL
614422	2009 HC_{73}	—	April 18, 2009	Kitt Peak	Spacewatch	·	1.5 km	MPC · JPL
614423	2009 HG_{77}	—	April 28, 2009	Mount Lemmon	Mount Lemmon Survey	·	2.4 km	MPC · JPL
614424	2009 HP_{97}	—	April 17, 2009	Mount Lemmon	Mount Lemmon Survey	·	1.9 km	MPC · JPL
614425	2009 HY_{101}	—	April 18, 2009	Kitt Peak	Spacewatch	LIX	3.3 km	MPC · JPL
614426	2009 HR_{106}	—	April 20, 2009	Kitt Peak	Spacewatch	·	1.5 km	MPC · JPL
614427	2009 JK_{1}	—	May 5, 2009	Kitt Peak	Spacewatch	AMO	380 m	MPC · JPL
614428	2009 JN_{1}	—	May 2, 2009	XuYi	PMO NEO Survey Program	T_{j} (2.92)	2.8 km	MPC · JPL
614429	2009 JN_{6}	—	May 13, 2009	Kitt Peak	Spacewatch	LIX	2.6 km	MPC · JPL
614430	2009 JR_{6}	—	May 13, 2009	Mount Lemmon	Mount Lemmon Survey	·	2.2 km	MPC · JPL
614431	2009 JP_{9}	—	May 14, 2009	Kitt Peak	Spacewatch	·	2.3 km	MPC · JPL
614432	2009 KG	—	May 17, 2009	Calvin-Rehoboth	L. A. Molnar	·	610 m	MPC · JPL
614433	2009 KK	—	May 17, 2009	Catalina	CSS	APO · PHA	270 m	MPC · JPL
614434	2009 KZ_{5}	—	May 25, 2009	Mount Lemmon	Mount Lemmon Survey	·	2.6 km	MPC · JPL
614435	2009 KT_{15}	—	May 26, 2009	Kitt Peak	Spacewatch	·	900 m	MPC · JPL
614436	2009 KZ_{15}	—	May 26, 2009	Kitt Peak	Spacewatch	·	2.4 km	MPC · JPL
614437	2009 OZ_{6}	—	July 27, 2009	Calvin-Rehoboth	Calvin College	·	770 m	MPC · JPL
614438	2009 OK_{9}	—	July 28, 2009	La Sagra	OAM	·	2.8 km	MPC · JPL
614439	2009 OS_{16}	—	July 28, 2009	Kitt Peak	Spacewatch	EUN	910 m	MPC · JPL
614440	2009 PA_{2}	—	August 15, 2009	Calvin-Rehoboth	L. A. Molnar	·	1.1 km	MPC · JPL
614441	2009 PN_{3}	—	August 12, 2009	La Sagra	OAM	·	1.0 km	MPC · JPL
614442	2009 PK_{5}	—	August 15, 2009	La Sagra	OAM	·	1.0 km	MPC · JPL
614443	2009 PW_{5}	—	August 10, 2009	Kitt Peak	Spacewatch	·	700 m	MPC · JPL
614444	2009 PA_{9}	—	August 15, 2009	Kitt Peak	Spacewatch	·	820 m	MPC · JPL
614445	2009 PQ_{19}	—	August 15, 2009	Socorro	LINEAR	·	1.2 km	MPC · JPL
614446	2009 PN_{20}	—	August 15, 2009	Catalina	CSS	·	2.2 km	MPC · JPL
614447	2009 QX_{16}	—	August 17, 2009	La Sagra	OAM	NYS	760 m	MPC · JPL
614448	2009 QN_{24}	—	August 16, 2009	Catalina	CSS	·	2.4 km	MPC · JPL
614449	2009 QB_{36}	—	August 29, 2009	Socorro	LINEAR	APO +1km	960 m	MPC · JPL
614450	2009 QB_{40}	—	August 25, 2009	Sandlot	G. Hug	·	1.1 km	MPC · JPL
614451	2009 QW_{41}	—	August 25, 2009	La Sagra	OAM	·	1.6 km	MPC · JPL
614452	2009 QQ_{42}	—	August 26, 2009	La Sagra	OAM	·	2.1 km	MPC · JPL
614453	2009 QH_{49}	—	August 28, 2009	Kitt Peak	Spacewatch	·	530 m	MPC · JPL
614454	2009 RR_{1}	—	September 10, 2009	La Sagra	OAM	·	680 m	MPC · JPL
614455	2009 RP_{6}	—	September 15, 2009	Bisei SG Center	BATTeRS	·	1.3 km	MPC · JPL
614456	2009 RD_{9}	—	September 12, 2009	Kitt Peak	Spacewatch	MAS	500 m	MPC · JPL
614457	2009 RE_{12}	—	September 12, 2009	Kitt Peak	Spacewatch	·	580 m	MPC · JPL
614458	2009 RX_{12}	—	September 12, 2009	Kitt Peak	Spacewatch	·	430 m	MPC · JPL
614459	2009 RX_{14}	—	September 12, 2009	Kitt Peak	Spacewatch	·	1.5 km	MPC · JPL
614460	2009 RH_{23}	—	September 15, 2009	Kitt Peak	Spacewatch	·	1.8 km	MPC · JPL
614461	2009 RJ_{39}	—	September 15, 2009	Kitt Peak	Spacewatch	·	670 m	MPC · JPL
614462	2009 RC_{40}	—	September 15, 2009	Kitt Peak	Spacewatch	·	460 m	MPC · JPL
614463	2009 RY_{44}	—	September 15, 2009	Kitt Peak	Spacewatch	·	900 m	MPC · JPL
614464	2009 RF_{49}	—	September 15, 2009	Kitt Peak	Spacewatch	·	2.8 km	MPC · JPL
614465	2009 RJ_{49}	—	September 15, 2009	Kitt Peak	Spacewatch	NYS	850 m	MPC · JPL
614466	2009 RD_{71}	—	September 15, 2009	Kitt Peak	Spacewatch	·	1.0 km	MPC · JPL
614467	2009 RL_{71}	—	September 15, 2009	Kitt Peak	Spacewatch	·	800 m	MPC · JPL
614468	2009 RK_{72}	—	September 15, 2009	Kitt Peak	Spacewatch	L4	8.0 km	MPC · JPL
614469	2009 RR_{73}	—	September 14, 2009	Kitt Peak	Spacewatch	·	1.6 km	MPC · JPL
614470 Flordeneu	2009 ST_{19}	Flordeneu	September 16, 2009	SM Montmagastrell	Bosch, J. M.	APO · PHA	750 m	MPC · JPL
614471	2009 SP_{32}	—	September 16, 2009	Kitt Peak	Spacewatch	·	570 m	MPC · JPL
614472	2009 SF_{47}	—	September 16, 2009	Kitt Peak	Spacewatch	·	3.1 km	MPC · JPL
614473	2009 SZ_{67}	—	September 17, 2009	Kitt Peak	Spacewatch	·	530 m	MPC · JPL
614474	2009 SP_{72}	—	September 17, 2009	Mount Lemmon	Mount Lemmon Survey	·	490 m	MPC · JPL
614475	2009 SZ_{74}	—	September 17, 2009	Kitt Peak	Spacewatch	·	2.1 km	MPC · JPL
614476	2009 SJ_{75}	—	September 17, 2009	Kitt Peak	Spacewatch	·	1.5 km	MPC · JPL
614477	2009 SA_{78}	—	September 18, 2009	Kitt Peak	Spacewatch	·	620 m	MPC · JPL
614478	2009 SN_{98}	—	September 24, 2009	Mount Lemmon	Mount Lemmon Survey	AMO	530 m	MPC · JPL
614479	2009 SV_{107}	—	September 16, 2009	Mount Lemmon	Mount Lemmon Survey	·	2.0 km	MPC · JPL
614480	2009 SH_{116}	—	September 18, 2009	Mount Lemmon	Mount Lemmon Survey	·	1.3 km	MPC · JPL
614481	2009 SY_{117}	—	September 18, 2009	Kitt Peak	Spacewatch	·	1.3 km	MPC · JPL
614482	2009 SZ_{124}	—	September 18, 2009	Kitt Peak	Spacewatch	·	470 m	MPC · JPL
614483	2009 SZ_{136}	—	September 18, 2009	Kitt Peak	Spacewatch	·	890 m	MPC · JPL
614484	2009 SK_{141}	—	September 19, 2009	Kitt Peak	Spacewatch	·	530 m	MPC · JPL
614485	2009 SV_{143}	—	September 19, 2009	Kitt Peak	Spacewatch	MAS	680 m	MPC · JPL
614486	2009 SO_{149}	—	September 20, 2009	Kitt Peak	Spacewatch	·	580 m	MPC · JPL
614487	2009 SK_{163}	—	September 21, 2009	Mount Lemmon	Mount Lemmon Survey	·	1.8 km	MPC · JPL
614488	2009 SJ_{165}	—	September 22, 2009	Kitt Peak	Spacewatch	·	1.8 km	MPC · JPL
614489	2009 SZ_{186}	—	September 21, 2009	Kitt Peak	Spacewatch	·	910 m	MPC · JPL
614490	2009 SK_{196}	—	September 22, 2009	Mount Lemmon	Mount Lemmon Survey	·	540 m	MPC · JPL
614491	2009 SP_{199}	—	September 22, 2009	Kitt Peak	Spacewatch	·	1.3 km	MPC · JPL
614492	2009 SK_{208}	—	September 23, 2009	Kitt Peak	Spacewatch	·	1.6 km	MPC · JPL
614493	2009 SW_{210}	—	September 23, 2009	Kitt Peak	Spacewatch	·	1.1 km	MPC · JPL
614494	2009 SJ_{213}	—	September 23, 2009	Kitt Peak	Spacewatch	·	900 m	MPC · JPL
614495	2009 SR_{213}	—	September 23, 2009	Kitt Peak	Spacewatch	·	550 m	MPC · JPL
614496	2009 SC_{218}	—	September 24, 2009	Kitt Peak	Spacewatch	critical	2.2 km	MPC · JPL
614497	2009 SB_{225}	—	September 25, 2009	Kitt Peak	Spacewatch	AGN	1 km	MPC · JPL
614498	2009 SU_{234}	—	September 17, 2009	La Sagra	OAM	·	3.3 km	MPC · JPL
614499	2009 SO_{244}	—	September 17, 2009	Kitt Peak	Spacewatch	·	570 m	MPC · JPL
614500	2009 SG_{257}	—	September 21, 2009	Mount Lemmon	Mount Lemmon Survey	HOF	1.9 km	MPC · JPL

== 614501–614600 ==
back to top

Designation			Discovery			Properties		Ref
Permanent	Provisional	Named after	Date	Site	Discoverer(s)	Category	Diam.	Ref
614501	2009 SS_{259}	—	September 22, 2009	Mount Lemmon	Mount Lemmon Survey	·	1.3 km	MPC · JPL
614502	2009 SZ_{261}	—	September 23, 2009	Kitt Peak	Spacewatch	·	1.9 km	MPC · JPL
614503	2009 ST_{283}	—	September 25, 2009	Kitt Peak	Spacewatch	·	730 m	MPC · JPL
614504	2009 SK_{289}	—	September 25, 2009	Kitt Peak	Spacewatch	MAS	490 m	MPC · JPL
614505	2009 SU_{297}	—	September 28, 2009	Mount Lemmon	Mount Lemmon Survey	·	2.1 km	MPC · JPL
614506	2009 SA_{303}	—	September 16, 2009	Mount Lemmon	Mount Lemmon Survey	critical	1.4 km	MPC · JPL
614507	2009 ST_{310}	—	September 18, 2009	Kitt Peak	Spacewatch	L4	7.5 km	MPC · JPL
614508	2009 SZ_{317}	—	September 20, 2009	Kitt Peak	Spacewatch	T_{j} (2.97) · critical	1.3 km	MPC · JPL
614509	2009 SH_{342}	—	September 16, 2009	Kitt Peak	Spacewatch	NYS	810 m	MPC · JPL
614510	2009 SL_{342}	—	September 16, 2009	Kitt Peak	Spacewatch	·	1.0 km	MPC · JPL
614511	2009 SZ_{342}	—	September 17, 2009	Kitt Peak	Spacewatch	THM	1.6 km	MPC · JPL
614512	2009 SZ_{348}	—	September 16, 2009	Mount Lemmon	Mount Lemmon Survey	(1547)	1.5 km	MPC · JPL
614513	2009 SL_{349}	—	September 21, 2009	Mount Lemmon	Mount Lemmon Survey	·	2.2 km	MPC · JPL
614514	2009 SC_{350}	—	September 21, 2009	Mount Lemmon	Mount Lemmon Survey	·	780 m	MPC · JPL
614515	2009 SK_{359}	—	September 22, 2009	Kitt Peak	Spacewatch	·	1.8 km	MPC · JPL
614516	2009 TC_{13}	—	October 15, 2009	Desert Moon	Stevens, B. L.	·	2.0 km	MPC · JPL
614517	2009 TJ_{13}	—	October 14, 2009	Bisei SG Center	BATTeRS	·	800 m	MPC · JPL
614518	2009 TT_{26}	—	October 14, 2009	La Sagra	OAM	EUN	1.0 km	MPC · JPL
614519	2009 TT_{31}	—	October 15, 2009	La Sagra	OAM	·	3.6 km	MPC · JPL
614520	2009 TF_{48}	—	October 12, 2009	Mount Lemmon	Mount Lemmon Survey	·	870 m	MPC · JPL
614521	2009 UK	—	October 16, 2009	Mount Lemmon	Mount Lemmon Survey	AMO	280 m	MPC · JPL
614522	2009 UK_{22}	—	October 17, 2009	Mount Lemmon	Mount Lemmon Survey	·	1.5 km	MPC · JPL
614523	2009 UB_{23}	—	October 17, 2009	Mount Lemmon	Mount Lemmon Survey	·	1.8 km	MPC · JPL
614524	2009 UC_{28}	—	October 22, 2009	Mount Lemmon	Mount Lemmon Survey	L4	6.1 km	MPC · JPL
614525	2009 UK_{33}	—	October 18, 2009	Mount Lemmon	Mount Lemmon Survey	·	520 m	MPC · JPL
614526	2009 UO_{43}	—	October 18, 2009	Mount Lemmon	Mount Lemmon Survey	·	1.3 km	MPC · JPL
614527	2009 UJ_{55}	—	October 23, 2009	Mount Lemmon	Mount Lemmon Survey	·	590 m	MPC · JPL
614528	2009 UG_{57}	—	October 23, 2009	Mount Lemmon	Mount Lemmon Survey	L4	7.1 km	MPC · JPL
614529	2009 UE_{59}	—	October 23, 2009	Mount Lemmon	Mount Lemmon Survey	·	740 m	MPC · JPL
614530	2009 UZ_{73}	—	October 21, 2009	Mount Lemmon	Mount Lemmon Survey	L4	6.9 km	MPC · JPL
614531	2009 UU_{84}	—	October 23, 2009	Mount Lemmon	Mount Lemmon Survey	·	530 m	MPC · JPL
614532	2009 UP_{85}	—	October 23, 2009	Mount Lemmon	Mount Lemmon Survey	NYS	880 m	MPC · JPL
614533	2009 UK_{91}	—	October 18, 2009	Catalina	CSS	·	1.5 km	MPC · JPL
614534	2009 UM_{93}	—	October 26, 2009	Bisei SG Center	BATTeRS	·	1.1 km	MPC · JPL
614535	2009 UB_{98}	—	October 23, 2009	Mount Lemmon	Mount Lemmon Survey	NYS	1.1 km	MPC · JPL
614536	2009 UG_{105}	—	October 25, 2009	Catalina	CSS	·	650 m	MPC · JPL
614537	2009 UL_{111}	—	October 23, 2009	Kitt Peak	Spacewatch	·	810 m	MPC · JPL
614538	2009 UE_{114}	—	October 21, 2009	Mount Lemmon	Mount Lemmon Survey	·	590 m	MPC · JPL
614539	2009 UK_{117}	—	October 22, 2009	Mount Lemmon	Mount Lemmon Survey	HOF	1.9 km	MPC · JPL
614540	2009 UH_{120}	—	October 23, 2009	Mount Lemmon	Mount Lemmon Survey	THM	1.5 km	MPC · JPL
614541	2009 UW_{130}	—	October 26, 2009	Mount Lemmon	Mount Lemmon Survey	·	3.7 km	MPC · JPL
614542	2009 UT_{154}	—	October 17, 2009	Mount Lemmon	Mount Lemmon Survey	·	480 m	MPC · JPL
614543	2009 VG_{26}	—	November 8, 2009	Kitt Peak	Spacewatch	·	770 m	MPC · JPL
614544	2009 VM_{30}	—	November 9, 2009	Mount Lemmon	Mount Lemmon Survey	·	3.1 km	MPC · JPL
614545	2009 VU_{39}	—	November 11, 2009	Kitt Peak	Spacewatch	·	570 m	MPC · JPL
614546	2009 VA_{42}	—	November 11, 2009	Kitt Peak	Spacewatch	·	560 m	MPC · JPL
614547	2009 VY_{46}	—	November 9, 2009	Mount Lemmon	Mount Lemmon Survey	·	560 m	MPC · JPL
614548	2009 VT_{48}	—	November 10, 2009	Kitt Peak	Spacewatch	LIX	3.4 km	MPC · JPL
614549	2009 VG_{56}	—	November 11, 2009	Mount Lemmon	Mount Lemmon Survey	·	780 m	MPC · JPL
614550	2009 VO_{64}	—	November 9, 2009	Kitt Peak	Spacewatch	·	580 m	MPC · JPL
614551	2009 VR_{67}	—	November 9, 2009	Kitt Peak	Spacewatch	·	1.6 km	MPC · JPL
614552	2009 VC_{69}	—	November 9, 2009	Kitt Peak	Spacewatch	NYS	620 m	MPC · JPL
614553	2009 VK_{69}	—	November 9, 2009	Kitt Peak	Spacewatch	·	980 m	MPC · JPL
614554	2009 VS_{73}	—	November 11, 2009	Mount Lemmon	Mount Lemmon Survey	·	1.9 km	MPC · JPL
614555	2009 VL_{82}	—	November 8, 2009	Kitt Peak	Spacewatch	·	810 m	MPC · JPL
614556	2009 VR_{91}	—	November 8, 2009	Catalina	CSS	·	2.3 km	MPC · JPL
614557	2009 VY_{104}	—	November 9, 2009	Catalina	CSS	H	690 m	MPC · JPL
614558	2009 VE_{111}	—	November 10, 2009	La Sagra	OAM	·	3.1 km	MPC · JPL
614559	2009 WA_{4}	—	November 16, 2009	Mount Lemmon	Mount Lemmon Survey	·	1.6 km	MPC · JPL
614560	2009 WN_{4}	—	November 16, 2009	Mount Lemmon	Mount Lemmon Survey	·	1.2 km	MPC · JPL
614561	2009 WF_{7}	—	November 19, 2009	Mount Lemmon	Mount Lemmon Survey	·	420 m	MPC · JPL
614562	2009 WG_{14}	—	November 16, 2009	Mount Lemmon	Mount Lemmon Survey	·	660 m	MPC · JPL
614563	2009 WM_{15}	—	November 16, 2009	Mount Lemmon	Mount Lemmon Survey	·	800 m	MPC · JPL
614564	2009 WO_{39}	—	November 17, 2009	Kitt Peak	Spacewatch	·	560 m	MPC · JPL
614565	2009 WN_{47}	—	November 19, 2009	Kitt Peak	Spacewatch	NYS	850 m	MPC · JPL
614566	2009 WV_{52}	—	November 22, 2009	Bisei SG Center	BATTeRS	·	1.6 km	MPC · JPL
614567	2009 WE_{54}	—	November 22, 2009	Nazaret	Muler, G.	·	850 m	MPC · JPL
614568	2009 WM_{58}	—	November 16, 2009	Mount Lemmon	Mount Lemmon Survey	·	1.0 km	MPC · JPL
614569	2009 WE_{59}	—	November 16, 2009	Mount Lemmon	Mount Lemmon Survey	L4	6.7 km	MPC · JPL
614570	2009 WF_{73}	—	November 18, 2009	Kitt Peak	Spacewatch	·	780 m	MPC · JPL
614571	2009 WQ_{73}	—	November 18, 2009	Kitt Peak	Spacewatch	·	1.4 km	MPC · JPL
614572	2009 WG_{93}	—	November 19, 2009	La Sagra	OAM	·	1.2 km	MPC · JPL
614573	2009 WG_{94}	—	November 20, 2009	Kitt Peak	Spacewatch	L4	6.1 km	MPC · JPL
614574	2009 WF_{99}	—	November 21, 2009	Kitt Peak	Spacewatch	·	2.7 km	MPC · JPL
614575	2009 WJ_{105}	—	November 23, 2009	La Sagra	OAM	H	440 m	MPC · JPL
614576	2009 WL_{130}	—	November 20, 2009	Mount Lemmon	Mount Lemmon Survey	·	3.5 km	MPC · JPL
614577	2009 WP_{137}	—	November 23, 2009	Mount Lemmon	Mount Lemmon Survey	·	750 m	MPC · JPL
614578	2009 WX_{159}	—	November 21, 2009	Kitt Peak	Spacewatch	·	3.0 km	MPC · JPL
614579	2009 WX_{167}	—	November 22, 2009	Kitt Peak	Spacewatch	·	690 m	MPC · JPL
614580	2009 WO_{182}	—	November 23, 2009	Kitt Peak	Spacewatch	·	610 m	MPC · JPL
614581	2009 WG_{201}	—	November 26, 2009	Kitt Peak	Spacewatch	·	620 m	MPC · JPL
614582	2009 WX_{202}	—	November 16, 2009	Kitt Peak	Spacewatch	·	2.5 km	MPC · JPL
614583	2009 WV_{212}	—	November 18, 2009	Kitt Peak	Spacewatch	·	640 m	MPC · JPL
614584	2009 WU_{236}	—	November 16, 2009	Kitt Peak	Spacewatch	·	2.9 km	MPC · JPL
614585	2009 WT_{237}	—	November 17, 2009	Kitt Peak	Spacewatch	·	690 m	MPC · JPL
614586	2009 WN_{245}	—	November 21, 2009	Kitt Peak	Spacewatch	(5)	630 m	MPC · JPL
614587	2009 WQ_{255}	—	November 20, 2009	Kitt Peak	Spacewatch	·	1.0 km	MPC · JPL
614588	2009 WC_{260}	—	November 21, 2009	Kitt Peak	Spacewatch	·	1.6 km	MPC · JPL
614589	2009 XZ_{13}	—	December 13, 2009	Mount Lemmon	Mount Lemmon Survey	·	1.9 km	MPC · JPL
614590	2009 XY_{21}	—	December 15, 2009	Mount Lemmon	Mount Lemmon Survey	T_{j} (2.82) · unusual	3.9 km	MPC · JPL
614591	2009 XT_{22}	—	December 13, 2009	Catalina	CSS	·	2.2 km	MPC · JPL
614592	2009 YS_{6}	—	December 17, 2009	Mount Lemmon	Mount Lemmon Survey	damocloid	8.0 km	MPC · JPL
614593	2009 YU_{7}	—	December 16, 2009	Kitt Peak	Spacewatch	·	1.1 km	MPC · JPL
614594	2009 YP_{19}	—	December 25, 2009	Kitt Peak	Spacewatch	MAS	540 m	MPC · JPL
614595	2010 AS_{9}	—	January 6, 2010	Kitt Peak	Spacewatch	THM	1.7 km	MPC · JPL
614596	2010 AR_{21}	—	January 6, 2010	Kitt Peak	Spacewatch	ADE	2.0 km	MPC · JPL
614597	2010 AJ_{33}	—	January 7, 2010	Kitt Peak	Spacewatch	·	2.4 km	MPC · JPL
614598	2010 AH_{58}	—	January 11, 2010	Kitt Peak	Spacewatch	·	2.5 km	MPC · JPL
614599	2010 AB_{78}	—	January 12, 2010	WISE	WISE	AMO +1km	1.7 km	MPC · JPL
614600	2010 BO_{6}	—	January 16, 2010	WISE	WISE	·	2.8 km	MPC · JPL

== 614601–614700 ==
back to top

Designation			Discovery			Properties		Ref
Permanent	Provisional	Named after	Date	Site	Discoverer(s)	Category	Diam.	Ref
614601	2010 BC_{50}	—	January 20, 2010	WISE	WISE	T_{j} (2.96)	3.4 km	MPC · JPL
614602	2010 BC_{106}	—	January 25, 2010	WISE	WISE	3:2 · SHU	4.4 km	MPC · JPL
614603	2010 CM	—	February 6, 2010	Mount Lemmon	Mount Lemmon Survey	AMO +1km	1.2 km	MPC · JPL
614604	2010 CB_{8}	—	February 7, 2010	WISE	WISE	T_{j} (2.97)	3.3 km	MPC · JPL
614605	2010 CL_{42}	—	February 6, 2010	Mount Lemmon	Mount Lemmon Survey	·	3.3 km	MPC · JPL
614606	2010 CY_{56}	—	February 13, 2010	Socorro	LINEAR	PHO	1.3 km	MPC · JPL
614607	2010 CY_{57}	—	February 11, 2010	WISE	WISE	THB	2.5 km	MPC · JPL
614608	2010 CG_{59}	—	February 14, 2010	Socorro	LINEAR	·	1.2 km	MPC · JPL
614609	2010 CR_{68}	—	February 10, 2010	Kitt Peak	Spacewatch	·	810 m	MPC · JPL
614610	2010 CB_{75}	—	February 13, 2010	Mount Lemmon	Mount Lemmon Survey	·	1.4 km	MPC · JPL
614611	2010 CF_{79}	—	February 13, 2010	Mount Lemmon	Mount Lemmon Survey	·	990 m	MPC · JPL
614612	2010 CL_{79}	—	February 13, 2010	Mount Lemmon	Mount Lemmon Survey	·	2.0 km	MPC · JPL
614613	2010 CR_{157}	—	February 15, 2010	Kitt Peak	Spacewatch	·	2.1 km	MPC · JPL
614614	2010 CG_{164}	—	February 10, 2010	Kitt Peak	Spacewatch	·	2.0 km	MPC · JPL
614615	2010 CB_{165}	—	February 10, 2010	Kitt Peak	Spacewatch	T_{j} (2.99)	3.6 km	MPC · JPL
614616	2010 CA_{181}	—	February 13, 2010	Haleakala	Pan-STARRS 1	·	730 m	MPC · JPL
614617	2010 CJ_{181}	—	February 14, 2010	Haleakala	Pan-STARRS 1	·	1 km	MPC · JPL
614618	2010 CP_{183}	—	February 15, 2010	Haleakala	Pan-STARRS 1	PHO	760 m	MPC · JPL
614619	2010 CW_{183}	—	February 15, 2010	Haleakala	Pan-STARRS 1	·	750 m	MPC · JPL
614620	2010 CW_{225}	—	February 8, 2010	WISE	WISE	T_{j} (2.9)	2.0 km	MPC · JPL
614621	2010 DZ_{19}	—	February 17, 2010	WISE	WISE	·	1.3 km	MPC · JPL
614622	2010 DH_{59}	—	February 24, 2010	WISE	WISE	·	2.7 km	MPC · JPL
614623	2010 DD_{70}	—	February 28, 2010	WISE	WISE	EUP	2.9 km	MPC · JPL
614624	2010 DV_{74}	—	February 17, 2010	Kitt Peak	Spacewatch	·	2.0 km	MPC · JPL
614625	2010 DU_{75}	—	February 17, 2010	Kitt Peak	Spacewatch	·	920 m	MPC · JPL
614626	2010 DO_{77}	—	February 16, 2010	Haleakala	Pan-STARRS 1	·	2.9 km	MPC · JPL
614627	2010 EZ_{21}	—	March 9, 2010	LightBuckets	Kurti, S.	H	430 m	MPC · JPL
614628	2010 ER_{38}	—	March 5, 2010	Catalina	CSS	·	2.0 km	MPC · JPL
614629	2010 ER_{68}	—	March 12, 2010	Mount Lemmon	Mount Lemmon Survey	BAR	1.0 km	MPC · JPL
614630	2010 EE_{70}	—	March 12, 2010	Kitt Peak	Spacewatch	T_{j} (2.97)	1.8 km	MPC · JPL
614631	2010 EQ_{78}	—	March 12, 2010	Mount Lemmon	Mount Lemmon Survey	·	1.2 km	MPC · JPL
614632	2010 EH_{103}	—	March 15, 2010	Mount Lemmon	Mount Lemmon Survey	·	1.4 km	MPC · JPL
614633	2010 EM_{112}	—	March 12, 2010	Kitt Peak	Spacewatch	·	940 m	MPC · JPL
614634	2010 EV_{113}	—	March 5, 2010	Catalina	CSS	T_{j} (2.99) · EUP	4.1 km	MPC · JPL
614635	2010 EB_{122}	—	March 15, 2010	Kitt Peak	Spacewatch	·	2.6 km	MPC · JPL
614636	2010 EE_{130}	—	March 13, 2010	Kitt Peak	Spacewatch	·	2.8 km	MPC · JPL
614637	2010 EK_{131}	—	March 14, 2010	Kitt Peak	Spacewatch	NYS	860 m	MPC · JPL
614638	2010 EO_{135}	—	March 13, 2010	Kitt Peak	Spacewatch	MAS	700 m	MPC · JPL
614639	2010 FE_{18}	—	March 18, 2010	Mount Lemmon	Mount Lemmon Survey	·	2.0 km	MPC · JPL
614640	2010 FL_{23}	—	March 18, 2010	Mount Lemmon	Mount Lemmon Survey	·	880 m	MPC · JPL
614641 Gregbredthauer	2010 GV_{21}	Gregbredthauer	April 1, 2010	WISE	WISE	PHO	1.9 km	MPC · JPL
614642	2010 GQ_{30}	—	April 4, 2010	Kitt Peak	Spacewatch	LIX	4.4 km	MPC · JPL
614643	2010 GH_{65}	—	April 10, 2010	WISE	WISE	T_{j} (2.99) · AMO	490 m	MPC · JPL
614644	2010 GZ_{103}	—	April 7, 2010	Kitt Peak	Spacewatch	NYS	830 m	MPC · JPL
614645	2010 GO_{134}	—	April 14, 2010	Kitt Peak	Spacewatch	EUN	890 m	MPC · JPL
614646	2010 GX_{135}	—	April 4, 2010	Kitt Peak	Spacewatch	·	1.0 km	MPC · JPL
614647	2010 GM_{144}	—	April 11, 2010	Mount Lemmon	Mount Lemmon Survey	·	4.7 km	MPC · JPL
614648	2010 HS_{90}	—	April 29, 2010	WISE	WISE	·	2.1 km	MPC · JPL
614649	2010 JP_{7}	—	May 1, 2010	WISE	WISE	·	2.3 km	MPC · JPL
614650	2010 JA_{30}	—	May 3, 2010	Kitt Peak	Spacewatch	·	990 m	MPC · JPL
614651	2010 JA_{41}	—	May 7, 2010	Kitt Peak	Spacewatch	·	2.3 km	MPC · JPL
614652	2010 JB_{43}	—	May 2, 2010	Kitt Peak	Spacewatch	EUN	1.0 km	MPC · JPL
614653	2010 JZ_{75}	—	May 5, 2010	Mount Lemmon	Mount Lemmon Survey	·	1.5 km	MPC · JPL
614654	2010 JZ_{86}	—	May 13, 2010	Nogales	Tenagra II	·	1.1 km	MPC · JPL
614655	2010 JR_{93}	—	May 10, 2010	WISE	WISE	PHO	1.8 km	MPC · JPL
614656	2010 JC_{115}	—	May 7, 2010	Mount Lemmon	Mount Lemmon Survey	·	1.3 km	MPC · JPL
614657	2010 JW_{127}	—	May 13, 2010	WISE	WISE	·	1.3 km	MPC · JPL
614658	2010 JL_{133}	—	May 14, 2010	WISE	WISE	·	950 m	MPC · JPL
614659	2010 JH_{155}	—	May 9, 2010	Mount Lemmon	Mount Lemmon Survey	·	1.4 km	MPC · JPL
614660	2010 JQ_{155}	—	May 9, 2010	Mount Lemmon	Mount Lemmon Survey	·	1.1 km	MPC · JPL
614661	2010 JV_{157}	—	May 13, 2010	Mount Lemmon	Mount Lemmon Survey	·	3.2 km	MPC · JPL
614662	2010 KF_{117}	—	May 17, 2010	Mount Lemmon	Mount Lemmon Survey	·	1.1 km	MPC · JPL
614663	2010 KO_{118}	—	May 30, 2010	WISE	WISE	·	1.7 km	MPC · JPL
614664 Martinroth	2010 LC_{17}	Martinroth	June 2, 2010	WISE	WISE	LIX	2.4 km	MPC · JPL
614665	2010 LT_{93}	—	June 12, 2010	WISE	WISE	·	3.6 km	MPC · JPL
614666	2010 LO_{101}	—	June 13, 2010	WISE	WISE	·	2.5 km	MPC · JPL
614667 Rogersmith	2010 LB_{125}	Rogersmith	June 15, 2010	WISE	WISE	·	1.8 km	MPC · JPL
614668	2010 MR_{5}	—	June 21, 2010	WISE	WISE	·	900 m	MPC · JPL
614669	2010 MZ_{24}	—	June 18, 2010	WISE	WISE	·	2.6 km	MPC · JPL
614670	2010 MB_{115}	—	June 30, 2010	WISE	WISE	3:2 · SHU	4.6 km	MPC · JPL
614671	2010 NU_{37}	—	July 8, 2010	WISE	WISE	·	1.6 km	MPC · JPL
614672	2010 ND_{40}	—	July 8, 2010	WISE	WISE	·	1.6 km	MPC · JPL
614673	2010 NW_{65}	—	July 13, 2010	La Sagra	OAM	·	1.8 km	MPC · JPL
614674	2010 OW	—	July 17, 2010	WISE	WISE	·	2.4 km	MPC · JPL
614675	2010 OE_{117}	—	July 30, 2010	WISE	WISE	T_{j} (2.99)	3.2 km	MPC · JPL
614676	2010 PQ_{8}	—	August 3, 2010	Socorro	LINEAR	·	900 m	MPC · JPL
614677	2010 PV_{9}	—	August 4, 2010	Socorro	LINEAR	·	1.1 km	MPC · JPL
614678	2010 PK_{10}	—	August 6, 2010	Socorro	LINEAR	·	2.1 km	MPC · JPL
614679	2010 PN_{57}	—	August 7, 2010	La Sagra	OAM	MAS	600 m	MPC · JPL
614680	2010 PP_{74}	—	August 11, 2010	La Sagra	OAM	·	2.4 km	MPC · JPL
614681	2010 RS_{26}	—	September 2, 2010	La Sagra	OAM	·	2.0 km	MPC · JPL
614682	2010 RA_{72}	—	September 10, 2010	La Sagra	OAM	·	890 m	MPC · JPL
614683	2010 RQ_{83}	—	September 1, 2010	Mount Lemmon	Mount Lemmon Survey	·	1.4 km	MPC · JPL
614684	2010 RQ_{106}	—	September 10, 2010	Kitt Peak	Spacewatch	MAS	480 m	MPC · JPL
614685	2010 RM_{157}	—	September 4, 2010	La Sagra	OAM	·	510 m	MPC · JPL
614686	2010 RZ_{159}	—	September 2, 2010	Mount Lemmon	Mount Lemmon Survey	·	1.3 km	MPC · JPL
614687	2010 UF_{105}	—	November 11, 2010	Mount Lemmon	Mount Lemmon Survey	·	1.1 km	MPC · JPL
614688	2011 KN_{36}	—	May 30, 2011	Mauna Kea	M. Micheli, D. J. Tholen	cubewano (cold)	141 km	MPC · JPL
614689	2020 XL_{5}	—	December 12, 2020	Haleakala	Pan-STARRS 1	APO	310 m	MPC · JPL
614690 Conversimarcello	2021 XT_{6}	Conversimarcello	December 4, 2021	Calar Alto-Schmidt	L. Conversi, M. Micheli	·	1.1 km	MPC · JPL
614691	1994 AM_{9}	—	January 8, 1994	Kitt Peak	Spacewatch	·	3.1 km	MPC · JPL
614692	1995 GE_{10}	—	October 23, 2008	Mount Lemmon	Mount Lemmon Survey	·	1.2 km	MPC · JPL
614693	1995 OL_{9}	—	July 27, 1995	Kitt Peak	Spacewatch	·	490 m	MPC · JPL
614694	1995 SM_{42}	—	September 25, 1995	Kitt Peak	Spacewatch	AGN	820 m	MPC · JPL
614695	1995 SP_{80}	—	September 30, 1995	Kitt Peak	Spacewatch	·	2.7 km	MPC · JPL
614696	1995 SM_{88}	—	September 26, 1995	Kitt Peak	Spacewatch	·	2.0 km	MPC · JPL
614697	1995 SJ_{89}	—	September 29, 1995	Kitt Peak	Spacewatch	·	740 m	MPC · JPL
614698	1995 SS_{90}	—	September 14, 2006	Kitt Peak	Spacewatch	EOS	1.8 km	MPC · JPL
614699	1995 TG_{7}	—	October 15, 1995	Kitt Peak	Spacewatch	·	600 m	MPC · JPL
614700	1995 UP_{22}	—	October 19, 1995	Kitt Peak	Spacewatch	·	1.9 km	MPC · JPL

== 614701–614800 ==
back to top

Designation			Discovery			Properties		Ref
Permanent	Provisional	Named after	Date	Site	Discoverer(s)	Category	Diam.	Ref
614701	1995 UV_{22}	—	October 19, 1995	Kitt Peak	Spacewatch	·	530 m	MPC · JPL
614702	1995 US_{24}	—	October 19, 1995	Kitt Peak	Spacewatch	KOR	1.3 km	MPC · JPL
614703	1995 UT_{31}	—	October 21, 1995	Kitt Peak	Spacewatch	V	520 m	MPC · JPL
614704	1995 UL_{56}	—	October 23, 1995	Kitt Peak	Spacewatch	·	610 m	MPC · JPL
614705	1995 UC_{58}	—	October 28, 1995	Kitt Peak	Spacewatch	615	1.3 km	MPC · JPL
614706	1995 UU_{66}	—	October 17, 1995	Kitt Peak	Spacewatch	KOR	1.2 km	MPC · JPL
614707	1995 UT_{81}	—	October 28, 1995	Kitt Peak	Spacewatch	·	560 m	MPC · JPL
614708	1995 WD_{24}	—	November 18, 1995	Kitt Peak	Spacewatch	·	950 m	MPC · JPL
614709	1995 YV_{26}	—	December 20, 1995	Kitt Peak	Spacewatch	LUT	4.1 km	MPC · JPL
614710	1996 BW_{14}	—	January 18, 1996	Kitt Peak	Spacewatch	·	780 m	MPC · JPL
614711	1996 CW_{4}	—	February 10, 1996	Kitt Peak	Spacewatch	·	1.2 km	MPC · JPL
614712	1996 EH_{3}	—	March 11, 1996	Kitt Peak	Spacewatch	·	1.4 km	MPC · JPL
614713	1996 RU_{21}	—	September 7, 1996	Kitt Peak	Spacewatch	·	620 m	MPC · JPL
614714	1996 RF_{34}	—	September 19, 2003	Kitt Peak	Spacewatch	·	670 m	MPC · JPL
614715	1996 TX_{43}	—	October 5, 1996	Kitt Peak	Spacewatch	·	2.7 km	MPC · JPL
614716	1996 VQ_{25}	—	November 10, 1996	Kitt Peak	Spacewatch	·	1.2 km	MPC · JPL
614717	1996 VS_{37}	—	November 13, 1996	Kitt Peak	Spacewatch	PHO	960 m	MPC · JPL
614718	1996 VF_{42}	—	November 29, 2003	Kitt Peak	Spacewatch	·	900 m	MPC · JPL
614719	1996 WG_{1}	—	November 18, 1996	Kitt Peak	Spacewatch	·	1.9 km	MPC · JPL
614720	1996 XK_{24}	—	December 6, 1996	Kitt Peak	Spacewatch	·	1.6 km	MPC · JPL
614721	1997 NE_{1}	—	July 2, 1997	Kitt Peak	Spacewatch	·	1.1 km	MPC · JPL
614722	1997 NV_{3}	—	July 6, 1997	Kitt Peak	Spacewatch	·	1.5 km	MPC · JPL
614723	1997 TP_{8}	—	October 4, 1997	Kitt Peak	Spacewatch	PHO	570 m	MPC · JPL
614724	1997 TT_{30}	—	September 6, 2013	Kitt Peak	Spacewatch	·	560 m	MPC · JPL
614725	1997 UV_{12}	—	October 23, 1997	Kitt Peak	Spacewatch	·	2.4 km	MPC · JPL
614726	1997 YN_{13}	—	December 29, 1997	Kitt Peak	Spacewatch	·	1.1 km	MPC · JPL
614727	1998 BY_{39}	—	January 31, 1998	Kitt Peak	Spacewatch	·	1.2 km	MPC · JPL
614728	1998 DW_{18}	—	February 24, 1998	Kitt Peak	Spacewatch	·	500 m	MPC · JPL
614729	1998 HE_{159}	—	November 9, 2009	Mount Lemmon	Mount Lemmon Survey	·	1.5 km	MPC · JPL
614730	1998 KX_{42}	—	May 28, 1998	Kitt Peak	Spacewatch	·	1.9 km	MPC · JPL
614731	1998 QB_{112}	—	August 30, 1998	Kitt Peak	Spacewatch	·	740 m	MPC · JPL
614732	1998 QE_{112}	—	July 26, 2008	Siding Spring	SSS	·	1.5 km	MPC · JPL
614733	1998 RO_{21}	—	September 15, 1998	Kitt Peak	Spacewatch	MAS	640 m	MPC · JPL
614734	1998 SW_{17}	—	September 17, 1998	Kitt Peak	Spacewatch	·	1.5 km	MPC · JPL
614735	1998 SO_{28}	—	September 17, 1998	Kitt Peak	Spacewatch	TEL	1.4 km	MPC · JPL
614736	1998 ST_{178}	—	October 24, 1998	Kitt Peak	Spacewatch	·	3.4 km	MPC · JPL
614737	1998 SH_{180}	—	September 19, 1998	Apache Point	SDSS Collaboration	EOS	1.4 km	MPC · JPL
614738	1998 SG_{181}	—	September 28, 1998	Kitt Peak	Spacewatch	·	870 m	MPC · JPL
614739	1998 SW_{181}	—	September 19, 1998	Apache Point	SDSS Collaboration	·	920 m	MPC · JPL
614740	1998 TR_{24}	—	October 14, 1998	Kitt Peak	Spacewatch	EOS	1.7 km	MPC · JPL
614741	1998 UO_{10}	—	October 16, 1998	Kitt Peak	Spacewatch	·	2.0 km	MPC · JPL
614742	1998 UG_{51}	—	October 29, 1998	Kitt Peak	Spacewatch	·	720 m	MPC · JPL
614743	1998 UJ_{51}	—	October 18, 2003	Kitt Peak	Spacewatch	·	1.7 km	MPC · JPL
614744	1998 VE_{41}	—	November 14, 1998	Kitt Peak	Spacewatch	·	1.6 km	MPC · JPL
614745	1998 VL_{57}	—	November 14, 1998	Kitt Peak	Spacewatch	MAS	540 m	MPC · JPL
614746	1998 YY_{33}	—	October 22, 2005	Kitt Peak	Spacewatch	·	990 m	MPC · JPL
614747	1999 BR_{8}	—	January 19, 1999	Kitt Peak	Spacewatch	·	620 m	MPC · JPL
614748	1999 BS_{35}	—	June 22, 2007	Kitt Peak	Spacewatch	EOS	1.7 km	MPC · JPL
614749	1999 EL_{15}	—	August 14, 2012	Les Engarouines	L. Bernasconi	EOS	2.2 km	MPC · JPL
614750	1999 EO_{15}	—	August 31, 2005	Kitt Peak	Spacewatch	HNS	1.1 km	MPC · JPL
614751	1999 FY_{97}	—	November 30, 2000	Kitt Peak	Spacewatch	·	680 m	MPC · JPL
614752	1999 FM_{99}	—	October 3, 2013	Mount Lemmon	Mount Lemmon Survey	·	2.3 km	MPC · JPL
614753	1999 FC_{101}	—	April 23, 2015	Haleakala	Pan-STARRS 1	·	1.4 km	MPC · JPL
614754	1999 KB_{9}	—	May 18, 1999	Socorro	LINEAR	·	1.7 km	MPC · JPL
614755	1999 PY_{6}	—	August 6, 1999	Cerro Tololo	Parker, J. W.	·	910 m	MPC · JPL
614756	1999 PF_{9}	—	September 16, 2003	Kitt Peak	Spacewatch	MAS	750 m	MPC · JPL
614757	1999 RZ_{29}	—	September 8, 1999	Socorro	LINEAR	·	1.3 km	MPC · JPL
614758	1999 RP_{90}	—	August 22, 1999	Catalina	CSS	·	860 m	MPC · JPL
614759	1999 RK_{243}	—	September 4, 1999	Kitt Peak	Spacewatch	·	450 m	MPC · JPL
614760	1999 RV_{259}	—	May 23, 2014	Haleakala	Pan-STARRS 1	·	2.2 km	MPC · JPL
614761	1999 RV_{260}	—	October 21, 2006	Mount Lemmon	Mount Lemmon Survey	·	530 m	MPC · JPL
614762	1999 TT_{2}	—	October 2, 1999	Kitt Peak	Spacewatch	·	440 m	MPC · JPL
614763	1999 TJ_{46}	—	October 4, 1999	Kitt Peak	Spacewatch	·	670 m	MPC · JPL
614764	1999 TB_{52}	—	October 4, 1999	Kitt Peak	Spacewatch	·	480 m	MPC · JPL
614765	1999 TD_{57}	—	September 19, 2003	Kitt Peak	Spacewatch	·	1.1 km	MPC · JPL
614766	1999 TG_{58}	—	October 6, 1999	Kitt Peak	Spacewatch	EUN	1.0 km	MPC · JPL
614767	1999 TN_{70}	—	October 9, 1999	Kitt Peak	Spacewatch	EUN	860 m	MPC · JPL
614768	1999 TV_{71}	—	October 9, 1999	Kitt Peak	Spacewatch	·	1.1 km	MPC · JPL
614769	1999 TV_{84}	—	October 13, 1999	Kitt Peak	Spacewatch	·	1.7 km	MPC · JPL
614770	1999 TY_{262}	—	October 15, 1999	Kitt Peak	Spacewatch	·	940 m	MPC · JPL
614771	1999 TW_{307}	—	October 4, 1999	Kitt Peak	Spacewatch	·	770 m	MPC · JPL
614772	1999 TK_{321}	—	January 17, 2005	Kitt Peak	Spacewatch	·	1.1 km	MPC · JPL
614773	1999 TO_{337}	—	August 8, 2016	Haleakala	Pan-STARRS 1	·	3.2 km	MPC · JPL
614774	1999 TO_{339}	—	October 4, 2015	Mount Lemmon	Mount Lemmon Survey	·	1.0 km	MPC · JPL
614775	1999 TK_{342}	—	September 20, 2006	Catalina	CSS	·	820 m	MPC · JPL
614776	1999 UO_{53}	—	October 19, 1999	Kitt Peak	Spacewatch	·	570 m	MPC · JPL
614777	1999 UB_{59}	—	October 14, 1999	Kitt Peak	Spacewatch	·	1.0 km	MPC · JPL
614778	1999 UN_{61}	—	October 12, 1999	Kitt Peak	Spacewatch	·	1.8 km	MPC · JPL
614779	1999 UW_{65}	—	November 17, 2006	Kitt Peak	Spacewatch	V	510 m	MPC · JPL
614780	1999 UH_{66}	—	October 2, 2006	Mount Lemmon	Mount Lemmon Survey	·	550 m	MPC · JPL
614781	1999 VA_{18}	—	November 2, 1999	Kitt Peak	Spacewatch	·	560 m	MPC · JPL
614782	1999 VZ_{41}	—	November 4, 1999	Kitt Peak	Spacewatch	HOF	2.1 km	MPC · JPL
614783	1999 VH_{47}	—	November 4, 1999	Socorro	LINEAR	BAR	1.2 km	MPC · JPL
614784	1999 VU_{106}	—	November 9, 1999	Socorro	LINEAR	·	640 m	MPC · JPL
614785	1999 VJ_{134}	—	November 10, 1999	Kitt Peak	Spacewatch	·	1.3 km	MPC · JPL
614786	1999 VF_{154}	—	November 11, 1999	Kitt Peak	Spacewatch	MAR	790 m	MPC · JPL
614787	1999 VU_{174}	—	November 1, 1999	Kitt Peak	Spacewatch	MAS	420 m	MPC · JPL
614788	1999 VP_{214}	—	November 1, 1999	Kitt Peak	Spacewatch	·	1.1 km	MPC · JPL
614789	1999 VE_{215}	—	November 1, 1999	Kitt Peak	Spacewatch	critical	690 m	MPC · JPL
614790	1999 VP_{224}	—	November 5, 1999	Kitt Peak	Spacewatch	·	620 m	MPC · JPL
614791	1999 VA_{232}	—	May 23, 2006	Kitt Peak	Spacewatch	HNS	1.1 km	MPC · JPL
614792	1999 VE_{233}	—	April 27, 2012	Haleakala	Pan-STARRS 1	·	430 m	MPC · JPL
614793	1999 XJ_{226}	—	December 14, 1999	Kitt Peak	Spacewatch	·	1.1 km	MPC · JPL
614794	1999 XV_{240}	—	December 7, 1999	Catalina	CSS	·	1.5 km	MPC · JPL
614795	1999 XD_{255}	—	December 12, 1999	Kitt Peak	Spacewatch	·	1.4 km	MPC · JPL
614796	1999 XA_{266}	—	December 11, 2013	Mount Lemmon	Mount Lemmon Survey	·	720 m	MPC · JPL
614797	2000 AW_{212}	—	January 6, 2000	Kitt Peak	Spacewatch	·	2.6 km	MPC · JPL
614798	2000 AC_{259}	—	October 20, 2011	Mount Lemmon	Mount Lemmon Survey	·	1.2 km	MPC · JPL
614799	2000 AQ_{259}	—	May 30, 2014	Haleakala	Pan-STARRS 1	·	1.4 km	MPC · JPL
614800	2000 BF_{31}	—	January 26, 2000	Kitt Peak	Spacewatch	·	720 m	MPC · JPL

== 614801–614900 ==
back to top

Designation			Discovery			Properties		Ref
Permanent	Provisional	Named after	Date	Site	Discoverer(s)	Category	Diam.	Ref
614801	2000 BH_{41}	—	January 12, 2000	Kitt Peak	Spacewatch	EOS	1.5 km	MPC · JPL
614802	2000 BQ_{53}	—	January 16, 2000	Kitt Peak	Spacewatch	·	1.1 km	MPC · JPL
614803	2000 CF_{73}	—	January 30, 2000	Kitt Peak	Spacewatch	·	900 m	MPC · JPL
614804	2000 CB_{103}	—	February 6, 2000	Socorro	LINEAR	JUN	1.1 km	MPC · JPL
614805	2000 CH_{107}	—	January 26, 2000	Kitt Peak	Spacewatch	·	590 m	MPC · JPL
614806	2000 CS_{109}	—	February 8, 2000	Kitt Peak	Spacewatch	·	740 m	MPC · JPL
614807	2000 CG_{119}	—	February 14, 2000	Kitt Peak	Spacewatch	·	2.4 km	MPC · JPL
614808	2000 CM_{134}	—	February 4, 2000	Kitt Peak	Spacewatch	V	570 m	MPC · JPL
614809	2000 CV_{138}	—	February 5, 2000	Kitt Peak	Spacewatch	·	2.5 km	MPC · JPL
614810	2000 CZ_{150}	—	November 27, 2006	Mount Lemmon	Mount Lemmon Survey	MAS	630 m	MPC · JPL
614811	2000 CY_{153}	—	March 4, 2011	Mount Lemmon	Mount Lemmon Survey	·	750 m	MPC · JPL
614812	2000 CG_{154}	—	March 29, 2014	Haleakala	Pan-STARRS 1	·	620 m	MPC · JPL
614813	2000 CP_{154}	—	April 2, 2011	Haleakala	Pan-STARRS 1	·	770 m	MPC · JPL
614814	2000 CL_{156}	—	August 21, 2006	Kitt Peak	Spacewatch	·	990 m	MPC · JPL
614815	2000 DH_{52}	—	February 29, 2000	Socorro	LINEAR	·	1.3 km	MPC · JPL
614816	2000 EJ_{99}	—	March 3, 2000	Kitt Peak	Spacewatch	·	2.1 km	MPC · JPL
614817	2000 EG_{142}	—	March 3, 2000	Socorro	LINEAR	·	1.5 km	MPC · JPL
614818	2000 EV_{202}	—	March 5, 2000	Cerro Tololo	Deep Lens Survey	·	1.3 km	MPC · JPL
614819	2000 EO_{211}	—	April 1, 2011	Kitt Peak	Spacewatch	·	750 m	MPC · JPL
614820	2000 FJ_{53}	—	March 30, 2000	Kitt Peak	Spacewatch	·	950 m	MPC · JPL
614821	2000 FH_{74}	—	March 30, 2000	Kitt Peak	Spacewatch	NYS	870 m	MPC · JPL
614822	2000 GV_{51}	—	April 5, 2000	Socorro	LINEAR	·	1.8 km	MPC · JPL
614823	2000 GL_{188}	—	October 20, 2011	Kitt Peak	Spacewatch	·	1.4 km	MPC · JPL
614824	2000 GD_{189}	—	February 7, 2011	Mount Lemmon	Mount Lemmon Survey	NYS	930 m	MPC · JPL
614825	2000 HE_{18}	—	April 24, 2000	Kitt Peak	Spacewatch	·	850 m	MPC · JPL
614826	2000 HN_{91}	—	April 30, 2013	Mount Lemmon	Mount Lemmon Survey	·	1.5 km	MPC · JPL
614827	2000 HU_{102}	—	April 26, 2000	Kitt Peak	Spacewatch	HYG	2.5 km	MPC · JPL
614828	2000 HV_{105}	—	April 26, 2000	La Silla	P. De Pascale	·	2.3 km	MPC · JPL
614829	2000 HD_{106}	—	October 3, 2013	Haleakala	Pan-STARRS 1	(5651)	2.7 km	MPC · JPL
614830	2000 JY_{64}	—	March 14, 2000	Catalina	CSS	T_{j} (2.9)	2.1 km	MPC · JPL
614831	2000 JQ_{94}	—	May 1, 2000	Kitt Peak	Spacewatch	·	1.4 km	MPC · JPL
614832	2000 JW_{94}	—	May 4, 2000	Apache Point	SDSS Collaboration	·	3.2 km	MPC · JPL
614833	2000 JW_{96}	—	March 14, 2016	Mount Lemmon	Mount Lemmon Survey	·	2.6 km	MPC · JPL
614834	2000 JE_{97}	—	March 31, 2011	Mount Lemmon	Mount Lemmon Survey	·	2.6 km	MPC · JPL
614835	2000 JR_{97}	—	October 12, 2016	Haleakala	Pan-STARRS 1	V	510 m	MPC · JPL
614836	2000 KZ_{35}	—	May 27, 2000	Socorro	LINEAR	·	1.2 km	MPC · JPL
614837	2000 KN_{43}	—	May 26, 2000	Kitt Peak	Spacewatch	NYS	1.0 km	MPC · JPL
614838	2000 KJ_{44}	—	May 28, 2000	Kitt Peak	Spacewatch	MAS	670 m	MPC · JPL
614839	2000 KM_{68}	—	May 29, 2000	Socorro	LINEAR	·	1.7 km	MPC · JPL
614840	2000 KJ_{69}	—	May 29, 2000	Kitt Peak	Spacewatch	V	600 m	MPC · JPL
614841	2000 KT_{84}	—	November 7, 2015	Mount Lemmon	Mount Lemmon Survey	·	600 m	MPC · JPL
614842	2000 MT_{7}	—	December 4, 2007	Mount Lemmon	Mount Lemmon Survey	EOS	2.0 km	MPC · JPL
614843	2000 MU_{7}	—	October 18, 2012	Haleakala	Pan-STARRS 1	·	950 m	MPC · JPL
614844	2000 OD_{65}	—	July 31, 2000	Cerro Tololo	Deep Ecliptic Survey	·	740 m	MPC · JPL
614845	2000 OH_{70}	—	September 5, 2013	Catalina	CSS	·	1.5 km	MPC · JPL
614846	2000 OV_{70}	—	September 5, 2008	Kitt Peak	Spacewatch	·	1.0 km	MPC · JPL
614847	2000 PK_{33}	—	October 14, 2004	Kitt Peak	Spacewatch	·	1.0 km	MPC · JPL
614848	2000 QW_{115}	—	August 26, 2000	Socorro	LINEAR	·	630 m	MPC · JPL
614849	2000 QB_{224}	—	August 26, 2000	Kitt Peak	Spacewatch	·	630 m	MPC · JPL
614850	2000 QG_{233}	—	August 25, 2000	Cerro Tololo	Deep Ecliptic Survey	NYS	910 m	MPC · JPL
614851	2000 QU_{233}	—	August 25, 2000	Cerro Tololo	Deep Ecliptic Survey	·	1.5 km	MPC · JPL
614852	2000 QU_{255}	—	April 1, 2008	Mount Lemmon	Mount Lemmon Survey	HOF	2.1 km	MPC · JPL
614853	2000 QD_{258}	—	December 15, 2006	Kitt Peak	Spacewatch	·	1.7 km	MPC · JPL
614854	2000 QP_{258}	—	September 20, 2014	Haleakala	Pan-STARRS 1	·	1.6 km	MPC · JPL
614855	2000 QU_{260}	—	February 28, 2009	Kitt Peak	Spacewatch	·	2.1 km	MPC · JPL
614856	2000 RC_{109}	—	September 4, 2000	Kitt Peak	Spacewatch	·	1.5 km	MPC · JPL
614857	2000 RP_{110}	—	November 14, 2010	Sandlot	G. Hug	DOR	1.7 km	MPC · JPL
614858	2000 RW_{110}	—	February 26, 2014	Haleakala	Pan-STARRS 1	·	1.2 km	MPC · JPL
614859	2000 RM_{111}	—	January 6, 2006	Mount Lemmon	Mount Lemmon Survey	·	1.1 km	MPC · JPL
614860	2000 RO_{111}	—	August 13, 2012	Haleakala	Pan-STARRS 1	·	770 m	MPC · JPL
614861	2000 RW_{111}	—	August 27, 2014	Haleakala	Pan-STARRS 1	AGN	960 m	MPC · JPL
614862	2000 SZ_{37}	—	September 4, 2000	Anderson Mesa	LONEOS	·	950 m	MPC · JPL
614863	2000 SS_{49}	—	September 23, 2000	Socorro	LINEAR	·	590 m	MPC · JPL
614864	2000 SP_{198}	—	September 24, 2000	Socorro	LINEAR	·	660 m	MPC · JPL
614865	2000 SY_{283}	—	September 23, 2000	Socorro	LINEAR	·	1.9 km	MPC · JPL
614866	2000 SA_{330}	—	September 27, 2000	Kitt Peak	Spacewatch	·	520 m	MPC · JPL
614867	2000 SP_{378}	—	May 3, 2008	Mount Lemmon	Mount Lemmon Survey	·	1.8 km	MPC · JPL
614868	2000 SC_{379}	—	November 9, 2013	Mount Lemmon	Mount Lemmon Survey	·	600 m	MPC · JPL
614869	2000 SH_{382}	—	February 23, 2012	Mount Lemmon	Mount Lemmon Survey	·	1.7 km	MPC · JPL
614870	2000 SF_{383}	—	November 30, 2010	Mount Lemmon	Mount Lemmon Survey	·	1.8 km	MPC · JPL
614871	2000 SP_{384}	—	March 16, 2012	Mount Lemmon	Mount Lemmon Survey	·	630 m	MPC · JPL
614872	2000 SV_{384}	—	October 12, 2013	Mount Lemmon	Mount Lemmon Survey	L5	7.9 km	MPC · JPL
614873	2000 TH_{32}	—	October 5, 2000	Kitt Peak	Spacewatch	·	770 m	MPC · JPL
614874	2000 TM_{49}	—	October 1, 2000	Socorro	LINEAR	·	1.6 km	MPC · JPL
614875	2000 TL_{75}	—	February 20, 2009	Kitt Peak	Spacewatch	·	2.5 km	MPC · JPL
614876	2000 TS_{79}	—	December 13, 2015	Haleakala	Pan-STARRS 1	·	1.7 km	MPC · JPL
614877	2000 TA_{80}	—	December 8, 2010	Kitt Peak	Spacewatch	·	610 m	MPC · JPL
614878	2000 TU_{81}	—	October 7, 2012	Haleakala	Pan-STARRS 1	·	760 m	MPC · JPL
614879	2000 UY_{15}	—	October 1, 2000	Socorro	LINEAR	NYS	1.2 km	MPC · JPL
614880	2000 VN_{4}	—	October 6, 2000	Anderson Mesa	LONEOS	·	1.2 km	MPC · JPL
614881	2000 VX_{65}	—	September 25, 2011	Haleakala	Pan-STARRS 1	·	2.3 km	MPC · JPL
614882	2000 WS_{11}	—	November 20, 2000	Kitt Peak	Spacewatch	·	640 m	MPC · JPL
614883	2000 WT_{19}	—	November 19, 2000	Kitt Peak	Spacewatch	·	570 m	MPC · JPL
614884	2000 WN_{129}	—	November 19, 2000	Kitt Peak	Spacewatch	·	1.3 km	MPC · JPL
614885	2000 WU_{198}	—	June 2, 2003	Kitt Peak	Spacewatch	·	4.4 km	MPC · JPL
614886	2000 WH_{199}	—	October 21, 2011	Mount Lemmon	Mount Lemmon Survey	·	1.1 km	MPC · JPL
614887	2000 WR_{199}	—	August 6, 2008	Siding Spring	SSS	·	1.3 km	MPC · JPL
614888	2000 WO_{202}	—	November 30, 2005	Kitt Peak	Spacewatch	·	1.7 km	MPC · JPL
614889	2000 YW_{100}	—	December 31, 2000	Haleakala	NEAT	·	1.6 km	MPC · JPL
614890	2000 YV_{118}	—	December 31, 2000	Piszkéstető	K. Sárneczky, L. Kiss	·	680 m	MPC · JPL
614891	2001 AM_{54}	—	June 10, 2015	Haleakala	Pan-STARRS 1	·	2.9 km	MPC · JPL
614892	2001 DV_{53}	—	February 16, 2001	Kitt Peak	Spacewatch	·	1.1 km	MPC · JPL
614893	2001 DG_{114}	—	January 29, 2009	Mount Lemmon	Mount Lemmon Survey	·	1.2 km	MPC · JPL
614894	2001 DY_{115}	—	November 28, 2016	Haleakala	Pan-STARRS 1	·	1.1 km	MPC · JPL
614895	2001 DE_{116}	—	September 29, 2011	Charleston	Holmes, R., T. Vorobjov	·	1.2 km	MPC · JPL
614896	2001 DN_{118}	—	August 10, 2007	Kitt Peak	Spacewatch	·	1.1 km	MPC · JPL
614897	2001 DN_{119}	—	December 5, 2008	Mount Lemmon	Mount Lemmon Survey	·	1.1 km	MPC · JPL
614898	2001 FM_{182}	—	March 24, 2001	Kitt Peak	Spacewatch	EOS	1.5 km	MPC · JPL
614899	2001 FH_{203}	—	September 19, 2007	Kitt Peak	Spacewatch	·	1.2 km	MPC · JPL
614900	2001 FK_{205}	—	March 21, 2001	Kitt Peak	SKADS	(5)	1.0 km	MPC · JPL

== 614901–615000 ==
back to top

Designation			Discovery			Properties		Ref
Permanent	Provisional	Named after	Date	Site	Discoverer(s)	Category	Diam.	Ref
614901	2001 FA_{221}	—	March 22, 2001	Kitt Peak	SKADS	·	830 m	MPC · JPL
614902	2001 FR_{225}	—	March 22, 2001	Kitt Peak	SKADS	·	570 m	MPC · JPL
614903	2001 FS_{228}	—	March 23, 2001	Kitt Peak	SKADS	·	510 m	MPC · JPL
614904	2001 FY_{233}	—	March 21, 2001	Kitt Peak	SKADS	MAS	570 m	MPC · JPL
614905	2001 FG_{244}	—	March 22, 2001	Kitt Peak	Spacewatch	T_{j} (2.99) · EUP	3.0 km	MPC · JPL
614906	2001 FJ_{244}	—	March 20, 2001	Kitt Peak	Spacewatch	·	780 m	MPC · JPL
614907	2001 FF_{245}	—	February 1, 2006	Kitt Peak	Spacewatch	·	1.5 km	MPC · JPL
614908	2001 FC_{246}	—	January 25, 2009	Kitt Peak	Spacewatch	(5)	1.1 km	MPC · JPL
614909	2001 FK_{247}	—	June 17, 2012	Mount Lemmon	Mount Lemmon Survey	·	450 m	MPC · JPL
614910	2001 KX_{2}	—	April 25, 2001	Anderson Mesa	LONEOS	T_{j} (2.9)	2.6 km	MPC · JPL
614911	2001 KJ_{18}	—	May 16, 2001	Kitt Peak	Spacewatch	V	640 m	MPC · JPL
614912	2001 KP_{80}	—	February 27, 2012	Haleakala	Pan-STARRS 1	·	2.4 km	MPC · JPL
614913	2001 KS_{80}	—	February 3, 2016	Haleakala	Pan-STARRS 1	·	2.3 km	MPC · JPL
614914	2001 KZ_{80}	—	November 18, 2003	Kitt Peak	Spacewatch	·	1.4 km	MPC · JPL
614915	2001 KB_{81}	—	September 24, 2011	Haleakala	Pan-STARRS 1	·	1.2 km	MPC · JPL
614916	2001 KR_{81}	—	September 24, 2008	Kitt Peak	Spacewatch	·	2.2 km	MPC · JPL
614917	2001 KV_{81}	—	April 20, 2012	Mount Lemmon	Mount Lemmon Survey	·	840 m	MPC · JPL
614918	2001 KX_{82}	—	September 26, 2012	Mount Lemmon	Mount Lemmon Survey	·	580 m	MPC · JPL
614919	2001 KD_{83}	—	September 18, 2009	Mount Lemmon	Mount Lemmon Survey	MAS	610 m	MPC · JPL
614920	2001 KJ_{83}	—	April 18, 2015	Kitt Peak	Spacewatch	·	630 m	MPC · JPL
614921	2001 KZ_{83}	—	September 13, 2013	Mount Lemmon	Mount Lemmon Survey	·	2.7 km	MPC · JPL
614922	2001 KD_{84}	—	February 22, 2009	Kitt Peak	Spacewatch	·	1.3 km	MPC · JPL
614923	2001 KV_{84}	—	December 29, 2013	Haleakala	Pan-STARRS 1	PHO	810 m	MPC · JPL
614924	2001 LZ_{19}	—	November 20, 2008	Kitt Peak	Spacewatch	·	3.3 km	MPC · JPL
614925	2001 LA_{20}	—	November 1, 2015	Haleakala	Pan-STARRS 1	HNS	1.2 km	MPC · JPL
614926	2001 LK_{20}	—	November 4, 2013	Haleakala	Pan-STARRS 1	·	2.3 km	MPC · JPL
614927	2001 LU_{20}	—	January 7, 2010	Mount Lemmon	Mount Lemmon Survey	EOS	1.8 km	MPC · JPL
614928	2001 MC_{22}	—	June 28, 2001	Palomar	NEAT	·	850 m	MPC · JPL
614929	2001 OU	—	July 17, 2001	Palomar	NEAT	·	680 m	MPC · JPL
614930	2001 OC_{4}	—	July 18, 2001	Palomar	NEAT	·	1.0 km	MPC · JPL
614931	2001 OD_{27}	—	July 18, 2001	Palomar	NEAT	·	1.1 km	MPC · JPL
614932	2001 OM_{28}	—	July 18, 2001	Palomar	NEAT	EUN	1.5 km	MPC · JPL
614933	2001 OK_{59}	—	July 21, 2001	Haleakala	NEAT	·	1.6 km	MPC · JPL
614934	2001 OM_{91}	—	July 13, 2001	Palomar	NEAT	·	3.4 km	MPC · JPL
614935	2001 OJ_{114}	—	October 16, 2007	Mount Lemmon	Mount Lemmon Survey	·	2.6 km	MPC · JPL
614936	2001 OK_{114}	—	May 25, 2014	Haleakala	Pan-STARRS 1	·	1.7 km	MPC · JPL
614937	2001 OZ_{114}	—	October 13, 2016	Mount Lemmon	Mount Lemmon Survey	·	1.0 km	MPC · JPL
614938	2001 OM_{115}	—	July 19, 2001	Palomar	NEAT	·	2.8 km	MPC · JPL
614939	2001 PX_{16}	—	August 9, 2001	Palomar	NEAT	·	3.1 km	MPC · JPL
614940	2001 PN_{23}	—	August 11, 2001	Haleakala	NEAT	·	1.0 km	MPC · JPL
614941	2001 PE_{43}	—	August 12, 2001	Haleakala	NEAT	·	1.3 km	MPC · JPL
614942	2001 PP_{49}	—	July 30, 2001	Palomar	NEAT	·	2.9 km	MPC · JPL
614943	2001 PN_{55}	—	August 14, 2001	Haleakala	NEAT	·	980 m	MPC · JPL
614944	2001 PB_{68}	—	August 1, 2001	Palomar	NEAT	·	1.6 km	MPC · JPL
614945	2001 QM_{44}	—	August 16, 2001	Socorro	LINEAR	·	1.0 km	MPC · JPL
614946	2001 QB_{98}	—	July 25, 2001	Haleakala	NEAT	·	880 m	MPC · JPL
614947	2001 QW_{150}	—	August 23, 2001	Socorro	LINEAR	H	450 m	MPC · JPL
614948	2001 QX_{164}	—	August 14, 2001	Haleakala	NEAT	·	1.1 km	MPC · JPL
614949	2001 QH_{185}	—	August 17, 2001	Palomar	NEAT	·	1.7 km	MPC · JPL
614950	2001 QK_{205}	—	August 19, 2001	Socorro	LINEAR	·	740 m	MPC · JPL
614951	2001 QJ_{307}	—	August 19, 2001	Cerro Tololo	Deep Ecliptic Survey	·	870 m	MPC · JPL
614952	2001 QW_{308}	—	August 19, 2001	Cerro Tololo	Deep Ecliptic Survey	PHO	840 m	MPC · JPL
614953	2001 QW_{329}	—	August 24, 2001	Anderson Mesa	LONEOS	·	990 m	MPC · JPL
614954	2001 QB_{336}	—	August 13, 2012	Haleakala	Pan-STARRS 1	·	930 m	MPC · JPL
614955	2001 QF_{337}	—	August 25, 2001	Kitt Peak	Spacewatch	MAS	600 m	MPC · JPL
614956	2001 QL_{339}	—	August 24, 2001	Kitt Peak	Spacewatch	VER	2.1 km	MPC · JPL
614957	2001 RD_{35}	—	September 8, 2001	Socorro	LINEAR	·	960 m	MPC · JPL
614958	2001 RW_{51}	—	May 22, 2001	Cerro Tololo	Deep Ecliptic Survey	·	2.4 km	MPC · JPL
614959	2001 RR_{95}	—	September 12, 2001	Socorro	LINEAR	PHO	760 m	MPC · JPL
614960	2001 RU_{96}	—	September 12, 2001	Kitt Peak	Spacewatch	·	3.5 km	MPC · JPL
614961	2001 RE_{97}	—	August 24, 2001	Kitt Peak	Spacewatch	·	630 m	MPC · JPL
614962	2001 RZ_{98}	—	September 12, 2001	Socorro	LINEAR	·	1.0 km	MPC · JPL
614963	2001 RH_{103}	—	August 28, 2001	Palomar	NEAT	·	1.4 km	MPC · JPL
614964	2001 RF_{106}	—	August 16, 2001	Socorro	LINEAR	·	1.0 km	MPC · JPL
614965	2001 RO_{140}	—	September 12, 2001	Socorro	LINEAR	·	760 m	MPC · JPL
614966	2001 RQ_{156}	—	April 10, 2013	Haleakala	Pan-STARRS 1	·	1.4 km	MPC · JPL
614967	2001 RF_{157}	—	September 19, 2008	Kitt Peak	Spacewatch	·	990 m	MPC · JPL
614968	2001 RC_{158}	—	January 13, 2011	Mount Lemmon	Mount Lemmon Survey	·	1.0 km	MPC · JPL
614969	2001 SD_{91}	—	August 26, 2001	Kitt Peak	Spacewatch	·	1.6 km	MPC · JPL
614970	2001 SE_{99}	—	September 20, 2001	Socorro	LINEAR	TIR	2.4 km	MPC · JPL
614971	2001 SX_{102}	—	May 23, 2001	Cerro Tololo	Deep Ecliptic Survey	·	1.4 km	MPC · JPL
614972	2001 SD_{112}	—	September 19, 2001	Socorro	LINEAR	·	800 m	MPC · JPL
614973	2001 SM_{144}	—	September 12, 2001	Kitt Peak	Spacewatch	·	1.1 km	MPC · JPL
614974	2001 SC_{184}	—	August 25, 2001	Anderson Mesa	LONEOS	·	1.1 km	MPC · JPL
614975	2001 SH_{185}	—	September 19, 2001	Socorro	LINEAR	·	2.2 km	MPC · JPL
614976	2001 SW_{185}	—	May 23, 2001	Cerro Tololo	Deep Ecliptic Survey	·	920 m	MPC · JPL
614977	2001 SL_{187}	—	August 27, 2001	Anderson Mesa	LONEOS	·	860 m	MPC · JPL
614978	2001 SK_{219}	—	September 19, 2001	Socorro	LINEAR	ADE	1.7 km	MPC · JPL
614979	2001 SR_{230}	—	September 19, 2001	Socorro	LINEAR	·	1.0 km	MPC · JPL
614980	2001 SY_{230}	—	September 19, 2001	Socorro	LINEAR	PHO	630 m	MPC · JPL
614981	2001 SP_{234}	—	August 24, 2001	Socorro	LINEAR	NYS	1.2 km	MPC · JPL
614982	2001 SZ_{254}	—	September 19, 2001	Socorro	LINEAR	·	1.7 km	MPC · JPL
614983	2001 SH_{258}	—	September 20, 2001	Socorro	LINEAR	·	1.4 km	MPC · JPL
614984	2001 SQ_{274}	—	September 20, 2001	Kitt Peak	Spacewatch	·	1.1 km	MPC · JPL
614985	2001 SE_{300}	—	September 12, 2001	Kitt Peak	Spacewatch	ADE	1.5 km	MPC · JPL
614986	2001 SO_{305}	—	September 18, 2001	Kitt Peak	Spacewatch	MAS	660 m	MPC · JPL
614987	2001 SN_{314}	—	September 23, 2001	Socorro	LINEAR	LIX	4.7 km	MPC · JPL
614988	2001 SB_{330}	—	August 28, 2001	Kitt Peak	Spacewatch	·	1.8 km	MPC · JPL
614989	2001 SB_{354}	—	September 24, 2001	Palomar	NEAT	·	1.6 km	MPC · JPL
614990	2001 SP_{360}	—	July 28, 2014	Haleakala	Pan-STARRS 1	WIT	780 m	MPC · JPL
614991	2001 SF_{362}	—	January 21, 2015	Haleakala	Pan-STARRS 1	URS	2.7 km	MPC · JPL
614992	2001 TM_{26}	—	October 7, 2001	Palomar	NEAT	·	2.2 km	MPC · JPL
614993	2001 TZ_{82}	—	September 28, 2001	Palomar	NEAT	·	1.1 km	MPC · JPL
614994	2001 TA_{147}	—	October 10, 2001	Palomar	NEAT	·	890 m	MPC · JPL
614995	2001 TO_{165}	—	September 28, 2001	Palomar	NEAT	·	1.2 km	MPC · JPL
614996	2001 TO_{181}	—	October 14, 2001	Socorro	LINEAR	·	1.2 km	MPC · JPL
614997	2001 TC_{207}	—	October 11, 2001	Palomar	NEAT	·	900 m	MPC · JPL
614998	2001 TX_{207}	—	September 12, 2001	Kitt Peak	Spacewatch	THM	2.4 km	MPC · JPL
614999	2001 TD_{212}	—	October 13, 2001	Socorro	LINEAR	·	1.0 km	MPC · JPL
615000	2001 TT_{261}	—	December 15, 2006	Kitt Peak	Spacewatch	·	1.8 km	MPC · JPL

back to top

== Meaning of names ==
As minor planet discoveries are confirmed, they are given a permanent number by the IAU's Minor Planet Center (MPC), and the discoverers can then submit names for them, following the IAU's naming conventions. The list below concerns those minor planets in the specified number-range that have received names, and explains the meanings of those names.

Official naming citations of newly named small Solar System bodies are approved and published in a bulletin by IAU's Working Group for Small Bodies Nomenclature (WGSBN). Before May 2021, citations were published in MPC's Minor Planet Circulars for many decades. Recent citations can also be found on the JPL Small-Body Database (SBDB). Until his death in 2016, German astronomer Lutz D. Schmadel compiled these citations into the Dictionary of Minor Planet Names (DMP) and regularly updated the collection.

Based on Paul Herget's The Names of the Minor Planets, Schmadel also researched the unclear origin of numerous asteroids, most of which had been named prior to World War II. This article incorporates text from this source, which is in the public domain: SBDB New namings may only be added to this list below after official publication as the preannouncement of names is condemned. The WGSBN publishes a comprehensive guideline for the naming rules of non-cometary small Solar System bodies.

Named minor planet	Provisional	This minor planet was named for...	Ref · Catalog
614470 Flordeneu	2009 ST_{19}	Flordeneu, character from the epic poem Canigó by Jacint Verdaguer	IAU · 614470
614641 Gregbredthauer	2010 GV_{21}	Greg Bredthauer (b. 1975), an American electrical engineer.	IAU · 614641
614664 Martinroth	2010 LC_{17}	Martin Roth, a German astronomer.	IAU · 614664
614667 Rogersmith	2010 LB_{125}	Roger Smith (b. 1955), the lead electronics engineer at the Caltech Optical Observatories	IAU · 614667
614690 Conversimarcello	2021 XT_{6}	Marcello Conversi (1917–1988), an Italian professor.	IAU · 614690
